= 2018 in golf =

This article summarizes the highlights of professional and amateur golf in the year 2018.

== Men's professional golf ==
=== Major championships ===
- 5–8 April: Masters Tournament – Patrick Reed won by one stroke over Rickie Fowler. It was his first major victory.
- 14–17 June: U.S. Open – Brooks Koepka won by one stroke over Tommy Fleetwood. It was his second straight U.S. Open championship.
- 19–22 July: The Open Championship – Francesco Molinari won by two strokes over Kevin Kisner, Rory McIlroy, Justin Rose, and Xander Schauffele. He was the first Italian to win a major championship.
- 9–12 August: PGA Championship – Brooks Koepka won by two strokes over Tiger Woods. He is the first player since Woods in 2000 to win both the U.S. Open and the PGA Championship in the same year.

=== World Golf Championships ===
- 1–4 March WGC-Mexico Championship – Phil Mickelson won in a playoff over Justin Thomas. It was his second WGC-Mexico Championship win, and his third WGC win overall.
- 21–25 March: WGC-Dell Technologies Match Play – Bubba Watson defeated Kevin Kisner, 7 & 6, in the championship match. It was the first time he won the Match Play event, and the second time he has won any WGC event.
- 2–5 August: WGC-Bridgestone Invitational – Justin Thomas won by four strokes over Kyle Stanley. It was his first WGC win.
- 25–28 October: WGC-HSBC Champions – Xander Schauffele won in a playoff over Tony Finau. It was his first WGC win.

=== FedEx Cup playoff events ===
- 23–26 August: The Northern Trust – Bryson DeChambeau won by four strokes over Tony Finau.
- 31 August – 3 September: Dell Technologies Championship – Bryson DeChambeau won his second straight playoff event by two strokes over Justin Rose.
- 6–9 September: BMW Championship – Keegan Bradley won in a playoff over Justin Rose.
- 20–23 September: Tour Championship – Tiger Woods won by two strokes over Billy Horschel. Justin Rose's T4 finish gave Rose the FedEx Cup.

=== Other leading PGA Tour events ===
- 10–13 May: The Players Championship – Webb Simpson won by four strokes over Xander Schauffele, Charl Schwartzel, and Jimmy Walker.

For a complete list of PGA Tour results see 2018 PGA Tour.

=== Leading European Tour events ===
- 24–27 May: BMW PGA Championship – Francesco Molinari won by two strokes over Rory McIlroy.
- 15–18 November: DP World Tour Championship, Dubai – Danny Willett won by two strokes over Patrick Reed and Matt Wallace.

For a complete list of European Tour results see 2018 European Tour.

=== Team events ===
- 12–14 January: EurAsia Cup – Europe defeated Asia by a score of 14 to 10.
- 28–30 September: Ryder Cup – Europe defeated USA by a score of 17.5 to 10.5.
- 22–25 November: World Cup of Golf – The Belgium team of Thomas Pieters and Thomas Detry won by three strokes over Australia and Mexico.

=== Tour leaders ===
- PGA Tour – (United States) Justin Thomas (US$8,694,821)
  - This total does not include FedEx Cup bonuses.
- European Tour – (Italy) Francesco Molinari (6,041,521 points)
- Japan Golf Tour – Shugo Imahira (¥139,119,332)
- Asian Tour – (India) Shubhankar Sharma (US$755,994)
- PGA Tour of Australasia – (Australia) Jake McLeod (A$255,326)
- Sunshine Tour – (South Africa) Zander Lombard (R 2,119,984) – 2018–19 season

=== Awards ===
- PGA Tour
  - FedEx Cup – (England) Justin Rose
  - PGA Player of the Year – (United States) Brooks Koepka
  - Player of the Year (Jack Nicklaus Trophy) – (United States) Brooks Koepka
  - Leading money winner (Arnold Palmer Award) – (United States) Justin Thomas
  - Vardon Trophy – (United States) Dustin Johnson
  - Byron Nelson Award – (United States) Dustin Johnson
  - Rookie of the Year – (United States) Aaron Wise
  - Payne Stewart Award – (Germany) Bernhard Langer
- European Tour
  - Golfer of the Year – (Italy) Francesco Molinari
  - Rookie of the Year – (India) Shubhankar Sharma
- Web.com Tour
  - Player of the Year – (South Korea) Im Sung-jae

=== Results from other tours ===
- 2018 Asian Tour
- 2018 PGA Tour of Australasia
- 2018 PGA Tour Canada
- 2018 Challenge Tour
- 2018 Japan Golf Tour
- 2018 PGA Tour Latinoamérica
- 2018–19 Sunshine Tour
- 2018 Web.com Tour

=== Other happenings ===
- 7 January: Three tours were added to the Official World Golf Ranking: Big Easy Tour, China Tour, and PGA Tour China, which returned after a one-year hiatus.
- 2 May: The Official World Golf Ranking Board removed OneAsia from the list of eligible tours.
- 13 May: Justin Thomas took over the world number one ranking from Dustin Johnson.
- 10 June: Johnson regained the world number one ranking from Thomas.
- 20 July: The OWGR board announced the addition of three tours starting in 2019: Professional Golf Tour of India, All Thailand Golf Tour, and Abema TV Tour (Japan Challenge Tour). The move expands the number of tours in the OWGR to 23.
- 10 September: Justin Rose took over the world number one ranking from Johnson. It is his first time at number one.
- 21 September: Oliver Fisher shot the first 59 (12-under-par) in European Tour history, in the second round of the Portugal Masters at Dom Pedro Victoria Golf Course in Vilamoura, Portugal.
- 23 September: Tiger Woods got his first victory in over five years, by winning the Tour Championship. It was his 80th victory on the PGA Tour. It also enabled him to finish second in the FedEx Cup standings.
- 23 September: Johnson regained the world number one ranking from Rose with a third place finish at the Tour Championship.
- 21 October: Brooks Koepka became the world number one after winning the CJ Cup.
- 4 November: Rose regained the world number one ranking from Koepka with a victory at the Turkish Airlines Open.
- 11 November: Koepka regained the world number one ranking from Rose.
- 18 November: Rose regained the world number one ranking from Koepka.
- 23 November: Phil Mickelson beat Tiger Woods in The Match: Tiger vs. Phil, a head-to-head match play golf challenge.
- 25 November: Koepka regained the world number one ranking from Rose.

== Women's professional golf ==
=== LPGA majors ===
- 29 March – 1 April: ANA Inspiration – Pernilla Lindberg won in a playoff over Inbee Park and Jennifer Song. It was her first major victory, as well as her first professional victory.
- 31 May – 3 June: U.S. Women's Open – Ariya Jutanugarn won in a playoff over Kim Hyo-joo. It was her first U.S. Women's Open championship, and her second major championship.
- 28 June – 1 July: KPMG Women's PGA Championship – Park Sung-hyun won the championship in a playoff over Nasa Hataoka and Ryu So-yeon. It was Park's second major win.
- 2–5 August: Women's British Open – Georgia Hall won her first major by two strokes over Pornanong Phatlum.
- 13–16 September: The Evian Championship – Angela Stanford won her first major championship by one stroke over four other players.

For a complete list of LPGA Tour results, see 2018 LPGA Tour.

=== Additional LPGA Tour events ===
- 15–18 November: CME Group Tour Championship – Lexi Thompson won the tournament by four strokes over Nelly Korda, while Ariya Jutanugarn won the Race to the CME Globe and took the US$1,000,000 bonus.

For a complete list of Ladies European Tour results see 2018 Ladies European Tour.

=== Team events ===
- 4–7 October: International Crown – Host South Korea won by four points over the United States and England teams.

=== Money list leaders ===
- LPGA Tour – (Thailand) Ariya Jutanugarn (US$2,743,949)
- LPGA of Japan Tour – (South Korea) Ahn Sun-ju (¥180,784,885)
- Ladies European Tour – (England) Georgia Hall (667.73 points)
- LPGA of Korea Tour – (South Korea) Lee Jeong-eun (₩957,641,447)
- ALPG Tour – (Australia) Minjee Lee (A$172,129, 2017/18 season)
- Symetra Tour – (China) Ruixin Liu (US$124,839)

=== Awards ===
- LPGA Tour Player of the Year – (Thailand) Ariya Jutanugarn
- LPGA Tour Rookie of the Year – (South Korea) Ko Jin-young
- LPGA Tour Vare Trophy – (Thailand) Ariya Jutanugarn
- LET Player of the Year – (England) Georgia Hall
- LET Rookie of the Year – (Sweden) Julia Engström
- LPGA of Japan Tour Player of the Year – (South Korea) Jiyai Shin
- LPGA of Korea Tour Player of the Year – (South Korea) Choi Hye-jin

=== Other tour results ===
- 2018 Symetra Tour
- 2018 Ladies Asian Golf Tour
- 2018 LPGA of Japan Tour
- 2018 LPGA of Korea Tour

=== Other happenings ===
- 7 March: The LPGA announced that starting in 2019, The Evian Championship, currently the final major championship of its season, will move from September to July. At that time, the prize fund will increase to US$4.1 million.
- 23 April: Inbee Park rose to number one in the Women's World Golf Rankings after finishing second at the Hugel-JTBC LA Open, replacing Shanshan Feng.
- 8 July: Kim Sei-young posted the lowest 72-hole score (257) and the lowest to-par score (−31) in LPGA Tour history at the Thornberry Creek LPGA Classic.
- 30 July: Ariya Jutanugarn regained the number one world ranking (last held in June 2017) after winning the Ladies Scottish Open.
- 20 August: Park Sung-hyun rose to number one in the Women's World Golf Rankings after winning the Indy Women in Tech Championship.
- 29 October: Jutanugarn regains the number one world ranking.

== Senior men's professional golf ==
=== Senior majors ===
- 17–20 May: Regions Tradition – Miguel Ángel Jiménez won by three strokes over Joe Durant, Gene Sauers, and Steve Stricker. It is his first major championship, and his fifth PGA Tour Champions victory. He became the first Spaniard to win a senior major championship.
- 24–27 May: Senior PGA Championship – Paul Broadhurst won by four strokes over Tim Petrovic. It was his first Senior PGA win and second senior major win.
- 28 June – 1 July: U.S. Senior Open – David Toms won his senior major by one stroke over three other golfers.
- 12–15 July: Senior Players Championship – Vijay Singh won his first senior major in a playoff over Jeff Maggert.
- 26–29 July: Senior Open Championship – Miguel Ángel Jiménez won his second major of the year, beating Bernhard Langer by one stroke.

=== Charles Schwab Cup playoff events ===
- 19–21 October: Dominion Charity Classic – Woody Austin won by one stroke over Bernhard Langer.
- 26–28 October: Invesco QQQ Championship – Scott Parel won by one stroke over Paul Goydos.
- 8–11 November: Charles Schwab Cup Championship – Vijay Singh, who entered the final round six shots behind Charles Schwab Cup points leader Scott McCarron, shot 61 while McCarron faded with 72. Singh ultimately won the tournament by four shots over Tim Petrovic, while Bernhard Langer overtook McCarron in the points race to claim his fifth Charles Schwab Cup title.

=== Full results ===
- 2018 PGA Tour Champions season
- 2018 Staysure Tour

=== Money list leaders ===
- PGA Tour Champions – (Germany) Bernhard Langer (US$2,222,154)
- European Senior Tour – (England) Paul Broadhurst (€547,793)

=== Awards ===
- PGA Tour Champions
  - Charles Schwab Cup – (Germany) Bernhard Langer
  - Player of the Year – (Germany) Bernhard Langer
  - Rookie of the Year – (United States) Ken Tanigawa
  - Leading money winner (Arnold Palmer Award) – (Germany) Bernhard Langer
  - Lowest stroke average (Byron Nelson Award) – (Germany) Bernhard Langer

== Amateur golf ==
- 20–23 January: Latin America Amateur Championship – World number 1 Joaquín Niemann from Chile won by five strokes over Álvaro Ortiz from Mexico.
- 18–23 May: NCAA Division I Women's Golf Championships – Jennifer Kupcho (Wake Forest) took the individual title and Arizona won its third team title, defeating Alabama, 3−2, in the final.
- 25–30 May: NCAA Division I Men's Golf Championships – Broc Everett (Augusta), won the individual title in a sudden-death playoff over Brandon Mancheno (Auburn). Oklahoma State won its 11th team title, defeating Alabama 5–0 in the finals.
- 8–10 June: Curtis Cup – The United States defeated Great Britain and Ireland, 17–3, the largest margin of victory in Cup history.
- 18–23 June: The Amateur Championship – Jovan Rebula of South Africa defeated Robin Dawson of Ireland, 3 and 2, in the final.
- 26–30 June: British Ladies Amateur Golf Championship – Leonie Harm of Germany won, 3 & 2, in the final against American Stephanie Lau.
- 6–12 August: U.S. Women's Amateur – Kristen Gillman defeated Jeon Ji-won in the final, 7 & 6. It was Gillman's second U.S. Women's Amateur, having won the 2014 title.
- 13–19 August: U.S. Amateur – Viktor Hovland defeated Devon Bling, 6 & 5 in the final.
- 29 August – 1 September: Espirito Santo Trophy – The United States team won for the 14th time, besting Japan by 10 strokes.
- 5–8 September: Eisenhower Trophy – Denmark won its first Eisenhower Trophy by one stroke over the United States.
- 4–7 October: Asia-Pacific Amateur Championship – Takumi Kanaya of Japan won by two strokes over Keita Nakajima and Rayhan Thomas.

== Golf in multi-sport events ==
- 25–28 June: Mediterranean Games – Spain swept the gold medals with Mario Galiano winning the men's individual gold, Marta Sanz winning the women's individual gold, and both men's and women's teams taking gold.
- 30 July – 2 August: Central American and Caribbean Games – Marcelo Rozo of Colombia won the men's gold and Alazne Urizar of Venezuela took the women's gold.
- 8–12 August: European Championships – The gold medals went to Pedro Oriol and Scott Fernández of Spain in the men's team event, Cajsa Persson and Linda Wessberg of Sweden in the women's team event, and Ólafía Þórunn Kristinsdóttir, Birgir Hafþórsson, Valdis Thora Jonsdottir, and Axel Bóasson of Iceland in the mixed team event.
- 23–26 August: Asian Games – Keita Nakajima took the men's individual gold and led the Japanese men's team to the team gold while Yuka Saso took the women's individual gold and led the Filipino women's team to the team gold.
- 9–15 October: Summer Youth Olympics – Australians Karl Vilips and Grace Kim won the men's and women's individual gold medals, respectively, and the Thailand team of Vanchai Luangnitikul and Atthaya Thitikul won the mixed team gold medal.

== Deaths ==
- 3 March – Lally Segard (born 1921), French amateur golfer who won the 1950 British Ladies Amateur.
- 9 March – Jerry Anderson (born 1955), Canadian golfer who won once on the European Tour.
- 13 March – Dave Ragan (born 1935), American golfer who won three times on the PGA Tour.
- 20 March – Bobby Mitchell (born 1943), American golfer who won twice on the PGA Tour.
- 22 March – Lyn Lott (born 1950), American golfer who played on the PGA Tour in the 1970s and 1980s.
- 4 April – Don Cherry, American singer and notable amateur golfer, winning the Canadian Amateur Championship in 1953.
- 14 May – Doug Ford (born 1922), American golfer who won 19 times on the PGA Tour including two majors; World Golf Hall of Fame member.
- 20 May – Carol Mann (born 1941), American golfer who won 38 times on the LPGA Tour including two majors; World Golf Hall of Fame member.
- 19 June – Hubert Green (born 1946), American golfer who won 19 times on the PGA Tour including two majors; World Golf Hall of Fame member.
- 20 June – Peter Thomson (born 1929), Australian golfer who won The Open Championship five times; World Golf Hall of Fame member.
- 26 June – Phil Rodgers (born 1938), American golfer who won six times on the PGA Tour.
- 17 July – Mark Hayes (born 1949), American golfer who won three times on the PGA Tour, including the 1977 Tournament Players Championship.
- 28 July – Bruce Lietzke (born 1951), American golfer who won 13 times on the PGA Tour.
- 29 July – Ian Stanley (born 1948), Australian golfer who won 30 times worldwide.
- 8 August – Jarrod Lyle (born 1981), Australian golfer who won twice on the Nationwide Tour
- 17 August – Bunky Henry (born 1944), American golfer who won once on the PGA Tour.
- 15 October – Shelley Hamlin (born 1949), American golfer who won three times on the LPGA Tour.
- 15 October – Jim Wiechers (born 1944), American golfer who won once on the PGA Tour.
- 5 December – Jim Jamieson (born 1943), American golfer who won once on the PGA Tour.
- 21 December – Forrest Fezler (born 1949), American golfer who won once on the PGA Tour.

== Table of results ==
This table summarizes all the results referred to above in date order.

Dates	Tournament	Status or tour	Winner
12–14 Jan	EurAsia Cup	Europe v Asia men's professional team event	Team Europe
20–23 Jan	Latin America Amateur Championship	Amateur men's individual tournament	(Chile) Joaquín Niemann
1–4 Mar	WGC-Mexico Championship	World Golf Championships	(United States) Phil Mickelson
21–25 Mar	WGC-Dell Technologies Match Play	World Golf Championships	(United States) Bubba Watson
29 Mar – 1 Apr	ANA Inspiration	LPGA major	(Sweden) Pernilla Lindberg
5–8 Apr	Masters Tournament	Men's major	(United States) Patrick Reed
10–13 May	The Players Championship	PGA Tour	(United States) Webb Simpson
17–20 May	Regions Tradition	Senior major	(Spain) Miguel Ángel Jiménez
18–23 May	NCAA Division I Women's Golf Championships	U.S. college championship	Arizona / Jennifer Kupcho
24–27 May	BMW PGA Championship	European Tour	(Italy) Francesco Molinari
24–27 May	Senior PGA Championship	Senior major	(England) Paul Broadhurst
25–30 May	NCAA Division I Men's Golf Championships	U.S. college championship	Oklahoma State / Broc Everett
31 May – 3 Jun	U.S. Women's Open	LPGA major	(Thailand) Ariya Jutanugarn
8–10 Jun	Curtis Cup	Amateur women's team tournament	United States
14–17 Jun	U.S. Open	Men's major	(United States) Brooks Koepka
18–23 Jun	The Amateur Championship	Amateur men's individual tournament	(South Africa) Jovan Rebula
26–30 Jun	British Ladies Amateur Golf Championship	Amateur women's individual tournament	(Germany) Leonie Harm
28 Jun – 1 Jul	U.S. Senior Open	Senior major	(United States) David Toms
28 Jun – 1 Jul	KPMG Women's PGA Championship	LPGA major	(South Korea) Park Sung-hyun
12–15 Jul	Constellation Senior Players Championship	Senior major	(Fiji) Vijay Singh
19–22 Jul	The Open Championship	Men's major	(Italy) Francesco Molinari
26–29 Jul	The Senior Open Championship	Senior major	(Spain) Miguel Ángel Jiménez
2–5 Aug	Ricoh Women's British Open	LPGA Tour and Ladies European Tour major	(England) Georgia Hall
2–5 Aug	WGC-Bridgestone Invitational	World Golf Championships	(United States) Justin Thomas
6–12 Aug	U.S. Women's Amateur	Amateur women's individual tournament	(United States) Kristen Gillman
9–12 Aug	PGA Championship	Men's major	(United States) Brooks Koepka
13–19 Aug	U.S. Amateur	Amateur men's individual tournament	(Norway) Viktor Hovland
23–26 Aug	The Northern Trust	PGA Tour FedEx Cup playoff	(United States) Bryson DeChambeau
29 Aug – 1 Sep	Espirito Santo Trophy	Women's amateur team event	United States
31 Aug – 3 Sep	Dell Technologies Championship	PGA Tour FedEx Cup playoff	(United States) Bryson DeChambeau
5–8 Sep	Eisenhower Trophy	Men's amateur team event	Denmark
6–10 Sep	BMW Championship	PGA Tour FedEx Cup playoff	(United States) Keegan Bradley
13–16 Sep	The Evian Championship	LPGA Tour and Ladies European Tour major	(United States) Angela Stanford
20–23 Sep	The Tour Championship	PGA Tour FedEx Cup playoff	(United States) Tiger Woods
28–30 Sep	Ryder Cup	European team vs. United States team men's professional team event	Team Europe
4–7 Oct	International Crown	LPGA Tour team event	South Korea
4–7 Oct	Asia-Pacific Amateur Championship	Amateur men's individual tournament	(Japan) Takumi Kanaya
19–21 Oct	Dominion Charity Classic	PGA Tour Champions Charles Schwab Cup playoff	(United States) Woody Austin
25–28 Oct	WGC-HSBC Champions	World Golf Championships	(United States) Xander Schauffele
26–28 Oct	Invesco QQQ Championship	PGA Tour Champions Charles Schwab Cup playoff	(United States) Scott Parel
8–11 Nov	Charles Schwab Cup Championship	PGA Tour Champions Charles Schwab Cup playoff	(Fiji) Vijay Singh
15–18 Nov	DP World Tour Championship, Dubai	European Tour	(England) Danny Willett
15–18 Nov	CME Group Tour Championship	LPGA Tour	(United States) Lexi Thompson
22–25 Nov	World Cup of Golf	Men's professional team event	Belgium
