= 2021 Players Championship =

48th Players Championship

Tournament information
- Dates: March 11–14, 2021
- Location: Ponte Vedra Beach, Florida; 30.198°N 81.394°W
- Courses: TPC Sawgrass, Stadium Course
- Tour: PGA Tour

Statistics
- Par: 72
- Length: 7,189 yards (6,574 m)
- Field: 154 players, 71 after cut
- Cut: 144 (E)
- Prize fund: $15 million
- Winner's share: $2.7 million

Champion
- (United States) Justin Thomas
- 274 (−14)
- Location in the United States Location in Florida

The 2021 Players Championship was the 47th Players Championship and was played March 11–14 at TPC Sawgrass in Ponte Vedra Beach, Florida. It was the fortieth edition held at the Stadium Course; the 2020 tournament was abandoned before the first round was completed, in response to the COVID-19 pandemic.

Justin Thomas shot a four-under 68 in the final round for 274 (−14) to win his first Players, one stroke ahead of runner-up Lee Westwood, the 54-hole leader. Defending champion Rory McIlroy (2019) missed the 36-hole cut.

== Venue ==
=== Course layout ===
The 2021 Players Championship
Tee	Rating/Slope	1	2	3	4	5	6	7	8	9	Out	10	11	12	13	14	15	16	17	18	In	Total
Par		4	5	3	4	4	4	4	3	5	36	4	5	4	3	4	4	5	3	4	36	72
Round 1		417	544	184	394	463	378	436	224	586	3,626	404	565	341	188	461	457	515	143	468	3,542	7,168
Round 2		439	536	165	386	474	393	448	213	574	3,628	430	534	368	168	480	452	537	146	453	3,568	7,196
Round 3		420	525	173	374	459	382	451	231	591	3,606	407	558	289	192	472	478	508	121	472	3,497	7,103
Round 4		431	539	155	382	472	389	437	244	572	3,621	423	535	308	151	483	450	521	133	444	3,448	7,069

== Field ==
The field consists of 154 players meeting various criteria; they include tournament winners on the PGA Tour since the previous Players Championship, recent winners of major championships, The Players and World Golf Championships, and leading players in the FedEx Cup standings from the current and preceding seasons. The field was expanded from the usual 144 with the late decision to include the top 125 players from the 2019–20 FedEx Cup standings.

=== Eligibility criteria ===
This list details the eligibility criteria for the 2021 Players Championship and the players who qualified under them; any additional criteria under which players were eligible is indicated in parentheses.

1. Winners of official PGA Tour events since the last completed Players Championship (2019)

- Daniel Berger (15,17)
- Patrick Cantlay (13,15,17)
- Paul Casey (15,17)
- Cameron Champ (15)
- Stewart Cink
- Corey Conners (15)
- Bryson DeChambeau (5,12,13,15,17)
- Tyler Duncan (15)
- Dylan Frittelli (15)
- Sergio García (2,15,17)
- Brian Gay (15)
- Branden Grace (15)
- Lanto Griffin (15,17)
- Tyrrell Hatton (12,15,17)
- Jim Herman (15)
- Max Homa (14,15,17)
- Viktor Hovland (15,17)
- Im Sung-jae (15,17)
- Dustin Johnson (2,5,8,15,17)
- Kang Sung-hoon (15)
- Kim Si-woo (3,15)
- Kevin Kisner (9,15,17)
- Jason Kokrak (15,17)
- Martin Laird
- Andrew Landry (15)
- Nate Lashley (15)
- Marc Leishman (15,17)
- Shane Lowry (4,15,17)
- Graeme McDowell (15)
- Rory McIlroy (3,11,12,15,17)
- Collin Morikawa (6,8,15,17)
- Sebastián Muñoz (15)
- Kevin Na (15,17)
- Joaquín Niemann (15,17)
- Carlos Ortiz (15,17)
- Ryan Palmer (15,17)
- Pan Cheng-tsung (15)
- J. T. Poston (15)
- Jon Rahm (13,15,17)
- Chez Reavie (15)
- Patrick Reed (2,8,15,17)
- Adam Scott (14,15,17)
- Webb Simpson (3,15,17)
- Cameron Smith (15,17)
- Robert Streb (15)
- Hudson Swafford (15)
- Nick Taylor (15)
- Justin Thomas (6,10,15,17)
- Michael Thompson (15)
- Brendon Todd (15,17)
- Richy Werenski (15)
- Gary Woodland (5,15,17)
- Harris English (15,17), (Note: English withdrew on the morning of the first round; Ventura replaced him in the field.) Brooks Koepka (5,6,10,15,17), (Note: Koepka withdrew on the Sunday prior to the start of the tournament due to a knee injury; Lahiri replaced him in the field.) Matthew Wolff (15,17) (Note: Wolff withdrew with a hand injury; Vegas replaced him in the field.) and Tiger Woods (2,7,15) did not play.

2. Recent winners of the Masters Tournament (2016–2020)

- Danny Willett did not play. (Note: Willett withdrew after testing positive for COVID-19; Hickok replaced him in the field.)

3. Recent winners of The Players Championship (2015–2019)

- Jason Day (6,15,17)
- Rickie Fowler (15)

4. Recent winners of The Open Championship (2015–2019)

- Zach Johnson (15)
- Francesco Molinari (12)
- Jordan Spieth (5,15)
- Henrik Stenson

5. Recent winners of the U.S. Open (2015–2020)

6. Recent winners of the PGA Championship (2015–2020)

- Jimmy Walker

7. Recent winners of the Tour Championship (2017–2018)

- Xander Schauffele (11,15,17)

8. Recent winners of the WGC Championship (2018–2021)

- Phil Mickelson (15)

9. Recent winners of the WGC Match Play (2018–2019)

- Bubba Watson (15)

10. Recent winners of the WGC Invitational (2017–2020)

- Hideki Matsuyama (15,17)

11. Recent winners of the WGC-HSBC Champions (2017–2019)

- Justin Rose (17) did not play. (Note: Rose withdrew on the morning of the first round due to a back injury; Stricker replaced him in the field.)

12. Recent winners of the Arnold Palmer Invitational (2018–2021)

13. Recent winners of the Memorial Tournament (2017–2020)

- Jason Dufner

14. Recent winners of the Genesis Invitational (2020–2021)

15. The top 125 players who earned the most FedEx Cup points from the start of the 2019–20 season to February 29, 2021

- An Byeong-hun
- Abraham Ancer (17)
- Ryan Armour
- Keegan Bradley
- Sam Burns
- Wyndham Clark
- Austin Cook
- Joel Dahmen
- Cameron Davis
- Tony Finau (17)
- Matt Fitzpatrick (17)
- Tommy Fleetwood (17)
- Lucas Glover
- Talor Gooch
- Emiliano Grillo
- Adam Hadwin
- James Hahn
- Brian Harman
- Scott Harrington
- Russell Henley
- Harry Higgs
- Bo Hoag
- Charley Hoffman
- Tom Hoge
- Billy Horschel (17)
- Mackenzie Hughes
- Charles Howell III
- Mark Hubbard
- Matt Jones
- Chris Kirk
- Russell Knox
- Matt Kuchar (17)
- Danny Lee
- Lee Kyoung-hoon
- Luke List
- Adam Long
- Peter Malnati
- Denny McCarthy
- Tyler McCumber
- Maverick McNealy
- Troy Merritt
- Matthew NeSmith
- Alex Norén
- Henrik Norlander
- Louis Oosthuizen (17)
- Pat Perez
- Scott Piercy
- Ian Poulter
- Doc Redman
- Patrick Rodgers
- Rory Sabbatini
- Scottie Scheffler (17)
- Robby Shelton
- Kyle Stanley
- Brendan Steele
- Sepp Straka
- Kevin Streelman
- Brian Stuard
- Vaughn Taylor
- Cameron Tringale
- Harold Varner III
- Aaron Wise
- Zhang Xinjun
- Zac Blair and Bud Cauley did not play.

16. The top 125 players who fulfilled the terms of a major medical extension

- Charl Schwartzel

17. The top 50 players from the Official World Golf Ranking as of March 1, 2021

- Christiaan Bezuidenhout
- Robert MacIntyre
- Victor Perez
- Lee Westwood
- Bernd Wiesberger
- Will Zalatoris

18. The Senior Players champion from the previous year

- Jerry Kelly

19. Remaining positions and alternates are filled through the current season's FedEx Cup standings as of March 1, 2021

- Doug Ghim (63rd)
- Patton Kizzire (73rd)
- Andrew Putnam (78th)
- Cameron Percy (89th)
- Jhonattan Vegas (92nd)
- Anirban Lahiri (104th)
- Kramer Hickok (106th)
- Kristoffer Ventura (110th)
- Steve Stricker (113th)

20. The top 125 players in the 2019–20 FedEx Cup regular season standings (Note: Unlike other categories, any player qualifying via this criterion would not have been replaced should they have withdrawn prior to the start of the tournament.)

- Scott Brown
- Brice Garnett
- Beau Hossler
- Tom Lewis
- Keith Mitchell
- Ryan Moore
- Sam Ryder
- Adam Schenk
- Brandt Snedeker
- Scott Stallings

== Round summaries ==
=== First round ===
Thursday, March 11, 2021
Friday, March 12, 2021

Sergio García, champion in 2008, took the first round lead with a 7-under-par 65, two strokes ahead of Brian Harman. Defending champion (2019) Rory McIlroy was 14 strokes back at 79. Play was suspended due to darkness, with 21 players on the course.

Place	Player	Score	To par
1	(Spain) Sergio García	65	−7
2	(United States) Brian Harman	67	−5
T3	(Canada) Corey Conners	68	−4
T3	(England) Matt Fitzpatrick	68	−4
T3	(Republic of Ireland) Shane Lowry	68	−4
T6	(United States) Bryson DeChambeau	69	−3
T6	(United States) Tom Hoge	69	−3
T6	(United States) Denny McCarthy	69	−3
T6	(Slovakia) Rory Sabbatini	69	−3
T6	(England) Lee Westwood	69	−3

=== Second round ===
Friday, March 12, 2021
Saturday, March 13, 2021

Lee Westwood led with a 9-under-par score of 135, a stroke ahead of Matt Fitzpatrick. The first round leader, Sergio García, had a 72 and was tied for third place with Chris Kirk who had a second round 65. Play was again suspended due to darkness, with 8 players still to complete their second rounds. 71 players scoring even par or better, made the cut.

Place	Player	Score	To par
1	(England) Lee Westwood	69-66=135	−9
2	(England) Matt Fitzpatrick	68-68=136	−8
T3	(Spain) Sergio García	65-72=137	−7
T3	(United States) Chris Kirk	72-65=137	−7
T5	(United States) Bryson DeChambeau	69-69=138	−6
T5	(United States) Doug Ghim	71-67=138	−6
T5	(United States) Brian Harman	71-67=138	−6
T5	(United States) Charley Hoffman	70-68=138	−6
T5	(South Korea) Im Sung-jae	72-66=138	−6
T5	(United States) Denny McCarthy	69-69=138	−6

=== Third round ===
Saturday, March 13, 2021

Lee Westwood had a third round of 68 to lead by two strokes over Bryson DeChambeau. The previous week, the two had played together in the final round of the Arnold Palmer Invitational, DeChambeau beating Westwood by a stroke. Justin Thomas shot a third round 64 to be tied for third place with Doug Ghim.

Place	Player	Score	To par
1	(England) Lee Westwood	69-66-68=203	−13
2	(United States) Bryson DeChambeau	69-69-67=205	−11
T3	(United States) Doug Ghim	71-67-68=206	−10
T3	(United States) Justin Thomas	71-71-64=206	−10
T5	(England) Paul Casey	73-67-67=207	−9
T5	(United States) Brian Harman	71-67-69=207	−9
T5	(Spain) Jon Rahm	72-68-67=207	−9
T8	(England) Matt Fitzpatrick	68-68-72=208	−8
T8	(Spain) Sergio García	65-72-71=208	−8
T8	(United States) Chris Kirk	72-65-71=208	−8

=== Final round ===
Sunday, March 14, 2021

Justin Thomas had a final round four-under-par 68 to finish with a score of 274, 14-under-par, to win by a stroke over Lee Westwood. Thomas was four shots behind Westwood after a bogey at the 8th hole. He then went birdie-birdie-eagle-birdie from the 9th to the 12th holes to take a two stroke lead. Westwood had a birdie at the 14th but made a three-putt bogey at the short 17th to drop two behind Thomas, level with his playing partner Bryson DeChambeau, who had eagled the 16th hole. Westwood had a birdie at the final hole to finish runner-up, with DeChambeau tied for third place with Brian Harman.

Champion
(c) = past champion

Place	Player	Score	To par	Money ($)
1	(United States) Justin Thomas	71-71-64-68=274	−14	2,700,000
2	(England) Lee Westwood	69-66-68-72=275	−13	1,635,000
T3	(United States) Bryson DeChambeau	69-69-67-71=276	−12	885,000
T3	(United States) Brian Harman	67-71-69-69=276	−12	885,000
T5	(England) Paul Casey	73-67-67-70=277	−11	579,375
T5	(United States) Talor Gooch	71-68-71-67=277	−11	579,375
7	(Canada) Corey Conners	68-72-72-66=278	−10	506,250
8	(Republic of Ireland) Shane Lowry	68-74-69-68=279	−9	468,750
T9	(United States) Daniel Berger	74-68-71-67=280	−8	339,375
T9	(England) Matt Fitzpatrick	68-68-72-72=280	−8	339,375
T9	(Spain) Sergio García (c)	65-72-71-72=280	−8	339,375
T9	(United States) Charles Howell III	73-70-71-66=280	−8	339,375
T9	(South Korea) Kim Si-woo (c)	72-70-67-71=280	−8	339,375
T9	(United States) Jason Kokrak	70-72-71-67=280	−8	339,375
T9	(France) Victor Perez	73-71-69-67=280	−8	339,375
T9	(Spain) Jon Rahm	72-68-67-73=280	−8	339,375

Leaderboard below the top 10
Place	Player	Score	To par	Money ($)
T17	(United States) Charley Hoffman	70-68-76-67=281	−7	221,250
T17	(South Korea) Im Sung-jae	72-66-77-66=281	−7	221,250
T17	(United States) Ryan Palmer	70-72-68-71=281	−7	221,250
T17	(Australia) Cameron Smith	71-73-65-72=281	−7	221,250
21	(United States) Will Zalatoris	70-71-70-71=282	−6	183,750
T22	(Mexico) Abraham Ancer	72-70-68-73=283	−5	135,964
T22	(South Africa) Dylan Frittelli	71-68-76-68=283	−5	135,964
T22	(United States) Tom Hoge	69-71-71-72=283	−5	135,964
T22	(United States) Adam Long	70-74-67-72=283	−5	135,964
T22	(United States) Tyler McCumber	72-69-72-70=283	−5	135,964
T22	(United States) J. T. Poston	76-68-69-70=283	−5	135,964
T22	(United States) Patrick Reed	70-72-70-71=283	−5	135,964
T29	(United States) Keegan Bradley	70-72-73-69=284	−4	96,125
T29	(United States) Doug Ghim	71-67-68-78=284	−4	96,125
T29	(Canada) Adam Hadwin	74-69-71-70=284	−4	96,125
T29	(United States) Harry Higgs	71-73-67-73=284	−4	96,125
T29	(Chile) Joaquín Niemann	73-71-70-70=284	−4	96,125
T29	(Australia) Cameron Percy	73-70-73-68=284	−4	96,125
T35	(Australia) Jason Day (c)	70-71-71-73=285	−3	73,125
T35	(United States) Lanto Griffin	73-71-68-73=285	−3	73,125
T35	(United States) Patton Kizzire	70-69-72-74=285	−3	73,125
T35	(United States) Phil Mickelson (c)	71-72-71-71=285	−3	73,125
T35	(United States) Ryan Moore	75-69-71-70=285	−3	73,125
T35	(United States) Brendon Todd	74-69-71-71=285	−3	73,125
T41	(South Africa) Christiaan Bezuidenhout	70-72-71-73=286	−2	53,250
T41	(United States) James Hahn	76-67-74-69=286	−2	53,250
T41	(United States) Zach Johnson	75-68-72-71=286	−2	53,250
T41	(South Korea) Lee Kyoung-hoon	72-71-71-72=286	−2	53,250
T41	(United States) Collin Morikawa	71-73-76-66=286	−2	53,250
T41	(South Africa) Louis Oosthuizen	73-69-74-70=286	−2	53,250
T41	(United States) Brendan Steele	72-72-71-71=286	−2	53,250
T48	(United States) Lucas Glover	75-69-72-71=287	−1	38,036
T48	(United States) Dustin Johnson	73-70-73-71=287	−1	38,036
T48	(United States) Chris Kirk	72-65-71-79=287	−1	38,036
T48	(Australia) Adam Scott (c)	72-71-73-71=287	−1	38,036
T48	(United States) Jordan Spieth	70-74-68-75=287	−1	38,036
T48	(Canada) Nick Taylor	70-74-72-71=287	−1	38,036
T48	(United States) Michael Thompson	71-73-72-71=287	−1	38,036
T55	(United States) Ryan Armour	74-68-71-75=288	E	34,950
T55	(Australia) Matt Jones	73-71-70-74=288	E	34,950
T55	(United States) Denny McCarthy	69-69-75-75=288	E	34,950
T58	(United States) Kramer Hickok	74-68-72-75=289	+1	34,050
T58	(United States) Billy Horschel	71-73-71-74=289	+1	34,050
T58	(United States) Brian Stuard	74-68-72-75=289	+1	34,050
T61	(United States) Scott Brown	71-70-72-77=290	+2	33,000
T61	(United States) Scott Harrington	72-71-77-70=290	+2	33,000
T61	(United States) Harold Varner III	70-73-71-76=290	+2	33,000
T61	(Venezuela) Jhonattan Vegas	73-71-72-74=290	+2	33,000
T65	(United States) Patrick Rodgers	74-70-73-74=291	+3	32,100
T65	(United States) Aaron Wise	73-71-72-75=291	+3	32,100
T67	(Scotland) Russell Knox	71-73-72-76=292	+4	31,500
T67	(Slovakia) Rory Sabbatini	69-75-74-74=292	+4	31,500
T69	(Scotland) Martin Laird	73-71-76-73=293	+5	30,900
T69	(United States) Scott Piercy	73-70-71-79=293	+5	30,900
71	(United States) Nate Lashley	74-69-75-76=294	+6	30,450
CUT	(United States) Brice Garnett	74-71=145	+1	
CUT	(Argentina) Emiliano Grillo	71-74=145	+1	
CUT	(England) Tyrrell Hatton	76-69=145	+1	
CUT	(United States) Mark Hubbard	78-67=145	+1	
CUT	(Australia) Marc Leishman	71-74=145	+1	
CUT	(United States) Luke List	73-72=145	+1	
CUT	(Japan) Hideki Matsuyama	76-69=145	+1	
CUT	(Colombia) Sebastián Muñoz	71-74=145	+1	
CUT	(United States) Scottie Scheffler	74-71=145	+1	
CUT	(United States) Adam Schenk	72-73=145	+1	
CUT	(Austria) Bernd Wiesberger	75-70=145	+1	
CUT	(United States) Stewart Cink	76-70=146	+2	
CUT	(United States) Joel Dahmen	72-74=146	+2	
CUT	(England) Tommy Fleetwood	75-71=146	+2	
CUT	(United States) Bo Hoag	74-72=146	+2	
CUT	(United States) Max Homa	73-73=146	+2	
CUT	(Norway) Viktor Hovland	72-74=146	+2	
CUT	(New Zealand) Danny Lee	72-74=146	+2	
CUT	(United States) Peter Malnati	76-70=146	+2	
CUT	(United States) Pat Perez	77-69=146	+2	
CUT	(United States) Andrew Putnam	74-72=146	+2	
CUT	(United States) Doc Redman	73-73=146	+2	
CUT	(United States) Robby Shelton	75-71=146	+2	
CUT	(United States) Webb Simpson (c)	71-75=146	+2	
CUT	(United States) Kevin Streelman	73-73=146	+2	
CUT	(United States) Bubba Watson	76-70=146	+2	
CUT	(United States) Gary Woodland	70-76=146	+2	
CUT	(United States) Tony Finau	78-69=147	+3	
CUT	(South Africa) Branden Grace	74-73=147	+3	
CUT	(Canada) Mackenzie Hughes	75-72=147	+3	
CUT	(United States) Andrew Landry	72-75=147	+3	
CUT	(England) Tom Lewis	73-74=147	+3	
CUT	(Scotland) Robert MacIntyre	74-73=147	+3	
CUT	(Northern Ireland) Graeme McDowell	73-74=147	+3	
CUT	(Italy) Francesco Molinari	76-71=147	+3	
CUT	(United States) Sam Ryder	72-75=147	+3	
CUT	(United States) Scott Stallings	76-71=147	+3	
CUT	(United States) Robert Streb	76-71=147	+3	
CUT	(United States) Steve Stricker	70-77=147	+3	
CUT	(United States) Cameron Tringale	73-74=147	+3	
CUT	(United States) Cameron Champ	75-73=148	+4	
CUT	(United States) Jason Dufner	73-75=148	+4	
CUT	(United States) Russell Henley	75-73=148	+4	
CUT	(Sweden) Alex Norén	78-70=148	+4	
CUT	(England) Ian Poulter	77-71=148	+4	
CUT	(United States) Chez Reavie	73-75=148	+4	
CUT	(United States) Xander Schauffele	76-72=148	+4	
CUT	(United States) Patrick Cantlay	74-75=149	+5	
CUT	(United States) Keith Mitchell	76-73=149	+5	
CUT	(Mexico) Carlos Ortiz	73-76=149	+5	
CUT	(United States) Brandt Snedeker	74-75=149	+5	
CUT	(Austria) Sepp Straka	74-75=149	+5	
CUT	(United States) Austin Cook	77-73=150	+6	
CUT	(Australia) Cameron Davis	76-74=150	+6	
CUT	(United States) Rickie Fowler (c)	77-73=150	+6	
CUT	(United States) Kevin Kisner	75-75=150	+6	
CUT	(India) Anirban Lahiri	78-72=150	+6	
CUT	(United States) Vaughn Taylor	76-74=150	+6	
CUT	(Norway) Kristoffer Ventura	74-76=150	+6	
CUT	(United States) Matt Kuchar (c)	76-75=151	+7	
CUT	(United States) Troy Merritt	74-77=151	+7	
CUT	(United States) Richy Werenski	80-71=151	+7	
CUT	(United States) Wyndham Clark	79-73=152	+8	
CUT	(United States) Beau Hossler	74-78=152	+8	
CUT	(United States) Jerry Kelly	73-79=152	+8	
CUT	(Taiwan) Pan Cheng-tsung	78-74=152	+8	
CUT	(South Africa) Charl Schwartzel	77-75=152	+8	
CUT	(China) Zhang Xinjun	76-76=152	+8	
CUT	(United States) Tyler Duncan	80-73=153	+9	
CUT	(United States) Matthew NeSmith	81-72=153	+9	
CUT	(United States) Brian Gay	80-74=154	+10	
CUT	(Northern Ireland) Rory McIlroy (c)	79-75=154	+10	
CUT	(Sweden) Henrik Norlander	80-74=154	+10	
CUT	(United States) Hudson Swafford	82-73=155	+11	
CUT	(United States) Sam Burns	81-76=157	+13	
CUT	(South Korea) Kang Sung-hoon	76-81=157	+13	
CUT	(United States) Maverick McNealy	80-77=157	+13	
CUT	(United States) Jimmy Walker	83-74=157	+13	
CUT	(United States) Jim Herman	81-77=158	+14	
CUT	(Sweden) Henrik Stenson (c)	85-74=159	+15	
CUT	(South Korea) An Byeong-hun	83-79=162	+18	
CUT	(United States) Kyle Stanley	83-84=167	+23	
WD	(United States) Kevin Na	81	+9	

==== Scorecard ====
Final round

Hole	1	2	3	4	5	6	7	8	9	10	11	12	13	14	15	16	17	18
Par	4	5	3	4	4	4	4	3	5	4	5	4	3	4	4	5	3	4
(United States) Thomas	−10	−10	−10	−10	−10	−10	−10	−9	−10	−11	−13	−14	−14	−13	−13	−14	−14	−14
(England) Westwood	−14	−13	−13	−12	−12	−12	−12	−11	−12	−12	−12	−12	−12	−13	−13	−13	−12	−13
(United States) DeChambeau	−11	−11	−11	−9	−9	−9	−10	−9	−9	−9	−9	−10	−11	−10	−10	−12	−12	−12
(United States) Harman	−9	−10	−9	−10	−10	−9	−9	−9	−9	−9	−9	−10	−11	−11	−11	−11	−12	−12
(England) Casey	−9	−10	−10	−9	−8	−9	−10	−10	−9	−9	−9	−9	−10	−10	−10	−11	−11	−11
(United States) Gooch	−5	−6	−6	−7	−6	−6	−7	−8	−8	−8	−9	−9	−10	−10	−10	−11	−11	−11
(Canada) Conners	−4	−5	−5	−5	−4	−5	−6	−6	−6	−7	−9	−9	−10	−10	−10	−10	−10	−10
(Republic of Ireland) Lowry	−6	−6	−6	−6	−7	−7	−7	−7	−8	−9	−9	−9	−9	−9	−9	−9	−8	−9

Cumulative tournament scores, relative to par

Eagle	Birdie	Bogey	Double bogey
