= Jones Cup Invitational =

Amateur golf tournament

Tournament information
- Location: Sea Island, Georgia
- Established: 2001
- Course: Ocean Forest Golf Club
- Par: 72
- Length: 7,321 yards (6,694 m)
- Organized by: Ocean Forest Golf Club
- Format: 54-hole stroke play
- Month played: January

Current champion
- Jacob Modleski

The Jones Cup Invitational is an annual amateur golf tournament. It has been played since 2001 at Ocean Forest Golf Club in Sea Island, Georgia. It was originally biannual but it became an annual event in 2009. It is an individual 54-hole stroke-play competition.

It is a "category A" tournament in the World Amateur Golf Ranking, meaning it is one of the top 30 men's amateur tournaments in the world.

== Winners ==
- 2026 William Sides
- 2025 Gray Albright
- 2024 Jacob Modleski
- 2023 David Ford
- 2022 Palmer Jackson
- 2021 Ludvig Åberg
- 2020 Davis Thompson
- 2019 Akshay Bhatia
- 2018 Garrett Barber
- 2017 Braden Thornberry
- 2016 Beau Hossler
- 2015 Austin Connelly
- 2014 Corey Conners
- 2013 Sean Dale
- 2012 Justin Thomas
- 2011 John Peterson
- 2010 Patrick Reed
- 2009 Kyle Stanley
- 2007 Luke List
- 2005 Nicholas Thompson
- 2003 Gregg Jones
- 2001 D. J. Trahan
