= 2020 WGC-FedEx St. Jude Invitational =

Tournament information
- Dates: July 30 – August 2
- Location: Memphis, Tennessee, U.S. 35.057°N 89.779°W
- Course: TPC Southwind
- Tours: PGA Tour; European Tour

Statistics
- Par: 70
- Length: 7,244 yards (6,624 m)
- Field: 78 players
- Cut: None
- Prize fund: $10,250,000
- Winner's share: $1,745,000

Champion
- (United States) Justin Thomas
- 267 (−13)
- Location in the United States Location in Tennessee

The 2020 WGC-FedEx St. Jude Invitational was the 22nd WGC Invitational held July 30 – August 2 at the TPC Southwind in Memphis, Tennessee. Originally planned for July 2–5, it was rescheduled and played with no spectators in attendance due to the COVID-19 pandemic.

FedEx Cup leader Justin Thomas won his second WGC Invitational title, and returned to No. 1 in the Official World Golf Ranking having last held that position in June 2018. Thomas became the third-youngest player to win 13 times on the PGA Tour since 1960, behind Tiger Woods and Jack Nicklaus.

== Venue ==
=== Course layout ===
TPC Southwind was designed by Ron Prichard, in consultation with tour pros Hubert Green and Fuzzy Zoeller. TPC Southwind opened thirty-eight years ago in 1988, and is a member of the Tournament Players Club network operated by the PGA Tour.

Hole	Yards	Par	Hole	Yards	Par
1	434	4	10	465	4
2	401	4	11	162	3
3	554	5	12	406	4
4	196	3	13	472	4
5	485	4	14	239	3
6	445	4	15	395	4
7	482	4	16	530	5
8	178	3	17	490	4
9	457	4	18	453	4
Out	3,632	35	In	3,612	35
Source:		Total		7,244	70

== Field ==
The field consists of players drawn primarily from the Official World Golf Ranking and the winners of the worldwide tournaments with the strongest fields. In order to ensure a field of 78 players, changes were made to the exemption criteria with the addition of players ranked outside the top-50 in the world rankings. The adjustment was due to the impact of the COVID-19 pandemic.

1. Playing members of the 2019 United States and International Presidents Cup teams.

An Byeong-hun (2), Abraham Ancer (2,3,4), Patrick Cantlay (2,3,4), Bryson DeChambeau (2,3,4,5), Tony Finau (2,3,4), Rickie Fowler (2,3,4), Adam Hadwin, Im Sung-jae (2,3,4,5), Dustin Johnson (2,3,4,5), Matt Kuchar (2,3,4), Marc Leishman (2,3,4,5), Li Haotong, Hideki Matsuyama (2,3,4), Joaquín Niemann (5), Louis Oosthuizen (2,3,4), Pan Cheng-tsung, Patrick Reed (2,3,4,5), Xander Schauffele (2,3,4), Webb Simpson (2,3,4,5), Cameron Smith (2,3,4,5), Justin Thomas (2,3,4,5), Gary Woodland (2,3,4)

- Adam Scott (2,3,4,5,6) and Tiger Woods (2,3,4,5) did not play.

2. The top 50 players from the Official World Golf Ranking as of March 15, 2020 (rankings frozen for 13 weeks).

Christiaan Bezuidenhout (3,4,6), Rafa Cabrera-Bello, Paul Casey (3,4,5), Matt Fitzpatrick (3,4), Tommy Fleetwood (3,4,5), Sergio García (3,4), Tyrrell Hatton (3,4,5), Billy Horschel (3,4), Jazz Janewattananond (3,4,6), Kevin Kisner (3,4), Brooks Koepka (3,4,5), Shane Lowry (3,4), Graeme McDowell (5), Rory McIlroy (3,4,5), Collin Morikawa (3,4,5), Kevin Na (3,4,5), Victor Perez (3,4,5), Jon Rahm (3,4,5), Chez Reavie (3,4), Scottie Scheffler, Brandt Snedeker, Henrik Stenson (3,4), Erik van Rooyen (3,4), Matt Wallace (3,4), Bernd Wiesberger (3,4,5), Danny Willett (3,4,5)

- Shugo Imahira (3,4,6), Francesco Molinari (3,4), Justin Rose (3,4), and Lee Westwood (3,4,5) did not play.

3. The top 50 players from the Official World Golf Ranking as of July 20, 2020.

Daniel Berger (4,5), Jason Day (4), Viktor Hovland (4), Ryan Palmer (4), Kevin Streelman (4)

4. The top 50 players from the Official World Golf Ranking as of July 27, 2020.

5. Tournament winners, whose victories are considered official, of tournaments from the Federation Tours since the prior season's WGC Invitational with an Official World Golf Ranking Strength of Field Rating of 115 points or more. (Note: The "Strength of Field Rating" is a measure of the overall quality of players in the field. It is used by the Official World Golf Ranking to determine the number of ranking points available at each tournament, subject to tour minimums.)

Cameron Champ, Tyler Duncan, Lucas Herbert, Matt Jones, Andrew Landry, J. T. Poston, Sebastian Söderberg, Nick Taylor, Michael Thompson, Brendon Todd

6. The winner of selected tournaments from each of the following tours

- Asian Tour: Indonesian Masters (2019) – Jazz Janewattananond, also qualified under categories 2, 3 and 4.
- PGA Tour of Australasia: Australian PGA Championship (2019) – Adam Scott, also qualified under categories 1, 2, 3, 4 and 5.
- Japan Golf Tour: Bridgestone Open (2019) – Shugo Imahira, also qualified under categories 2, 3 and 4.
- Japan Golf Tour: Japan Golf Tour Championship (2020) – Cancelled
- Sunshine Tour: Dimension Data Pro-Am (2020) – Christiaan Bezuidenhout, also qualified under categories 2, 3 and 4.

7. Alternates to fill field to 78 (if necessary) from the Official World Golf Ranking as of July 20, 2020

1. Ian Poulter (53)
2. Matthew Wolff (55)
3. Kang Sung-hoon (58)
4. Bubba Watson (59)
5. Jordan Spieth (60)
6. Corey Conners (63)
7. Jason Kokrak (66)
8. Tom Lewis (67)
9. Joel Dahmen (68)
10. Shaun Norris (69)
11. Phil Mickelson (70)
12. Keegan Bradley (72)
13. ~~Thomas Pieters~~ (73) – Did not play
14. Max Homa (74)
15. Mackenzie Hughes (75)
16. Robert MacIntyre (76)

== Round summaries ==
=== First round ===
Thursday, July 30, 2020

With only one top-10 finish since August 2019, defending champion Brooks Koepka tied his career-best score with a 62 to take the first-round lead. Koepka has a reputation of peaking during major season, and the first major of the season is due to be held the following week.

Place	Player	Score	To par
1	(United States) Brooks Koepka	62	−8
T2	(United States) Rickie Fowler	64	−6
T2	(United States) Brendon Todd	64	−6
4	(South Korea) Kang Sung-hoon	65	−5
T5	(United States) Max Homa	66	−4
T5	(United States) Matt Kuchar	66	−4
T5	(United States) Chez Reavie	66	−4
T5	(United States) Justin Thomas	66	−4
T9	(Mexico) Abraham Ancer	67	−3
T9	(United States) Bryson DeChambeau	67	−3
T9	(Spain) Sergio García	67	−3
T9	(Norway) Viktor Hovland	67	−3
T9	(South Korea) Im Sung-jae	67	−3
T9	(United States) Phil Mickelson	67	−3

=== Second round ===
Friday, July 31, 2020

Brendon Todd took a 36-hole lead attempting to gain his third victory this PGA Tour season, two strokes ahead of Rickie Fowler who was also aiming for his first World Golf Championship win.

Place	Player	Score	To par
1	(United States) Brendon Todd	64-65=129	−11
2	(United States) Rickie Fowler	64-67=131	−9
T3	(South Korea) An Byeong-hun	68-65=133	−7
T3	(United States) Brooks Koepka	62-71=133	−7
T3	(United States) Chez Reavie	66-67=133	−7
T6	(England) Matt Fitzpatrick	70-64=134	−6
T6	(South Korea) Kang Sung-hoon	65-69=134	−6
T8	(Australia) Jason Day	68-67=135	−5
T8	(South Korea) Im Sung-jae	67-68=135	−5
T8	(South Africa) Louis Oosthuizen	68-67=135	−5
T8	(United States) Webb Simpson	69-66=135	−5

=== Third round ===
Saturday, August 1, 2020

Brendon Todd maintained his 36-hole lead. Tom Lewis tied the tournament and course record with a 9-under 61 to move 47 spots up the leaderboard.

Place	Player	Score	To par
1	(United States) Brendon Todd	64-65-69=198	−12
2	(South Korea) An Byeong-hun	68-65-66=199	−11
3	(United States) Rickie Fowler	64-67-69=200	−10
4	(United States) Brooks Koepka	62-71-68=201	−9
5	(United States) Justin Thomas	66-70-66=202	−8
T6	(England) Matt Fitzpatrick	70-64-69=203	−7
T6	(United States) Phil Mickelson	67-70-66=203	−7
T6	(South Africa) Louis Oosthuizen	68-67-68=203	−7
T6	(United States) Chez Reavie	66-67-70=203	−7
T10	(South Africa) Christiaan Bezuidenhout	71-69-64=204	−6
T10	(United States) Joel Dahmen	72-67-65=204	−6
T10	(Australia) Jason Day	68-67-69=204	−6
T10	(South Korea) Im Sung-jae	67-68-69=204	−6
T10	(England) Tom Lewis	73-70-61=204	−6
T10	(Republic of Ireland) Shane Lowry	68-69-67=204	−6
T10	(United States) Webb Simpson	69-66-69=204	−6

=== Final round ===
Sunday, August 2, 2020

==== Final leaderboard ====
Champion
(c) = past champion

Place	Player	Score	To par	Money ($)
1	(United States) Justin Thomas (c)	66-70-66-65=267	−13	1,745,000
T2	(United States) Daniel Berger	71-67-67-65=270	−10	695,000
T2	(United States) Brooks Koepka (c)	62-71-68-69=270	−10	695,000
T2	(England) Tom Lewis	73-70-61-66=270	−10	695,000
T2	(United States) Phil Mickelson	67-70-66-67=270	−10	695,000
T6	(Australia) Jason Day	68-67-69-67=271	−9	268,333
T6	(England) Matt Fitzpatrick	70-64-69-68=271	−9	268,333
T6	(Republic of Ireland) Shane Lowry (c)	68-69-67-67=271	−9	268,333
T6	(South Africa) Louis Oosthuizen	68-67-68-68=271	−9	268,333
T6	(United States) Chez Reavie	66-67-70-68=271	−9	268,333
T6	(United States) Xander Schauffele	68-70-67-66=271	−9	268,333

Leaderboard below the top 10
Place	Player	Score	To par	Money ($)
T12	(South Korea) An Byeong-hun	68-65-66-73=272	−8	166,667
T12	(United States) Dustin Johnson (c)	69-68-68-67=272	−8	166,667
T12	(United States) Webb Simpson	69-66-69-68=272	−8	166,667
T15	(Mexico) Abraham Ancer	67-75-65-66=273	−7	131,400
T15	(United States) Rickie Fowler	64-67-69-73=273	−7	131,400
T15	(United States) Ryan Palmer	69-69-71-64=273	−7	131,400
T15	(United States) Scottie Scheffler	69-67-69-68=273	−7	131,400
T15	(United States) Brendon Todd	64-65-69-75=273	−7	131,400
T20	(South Africa) Christiaan Bezuidenhout	71-69-64-70=274	−6	106,200
T20	(United States) Joel Dahmen	72-67-65-70=274	−6	106,200
T20	(Japan) Hideki Matsuyama (c)	68-71-67-68=274	−6	106,200
T20	(United States) Collin Morikawa	70-71-67-66=274	−6	106,200
T20	(South Africa) Erik van Rooyen	71-70-68-65=274	−6	106,200
T25	(United States) Cameron Champ	71-68-67-69=275	−5	87,200
T25	(United States) Billy Horschel	70-70-68-67=275	−5	87,200
T25	(United States) Kevin Kisner	70-68-72-65=275	−5	87,200
T25	(United States) Matt Kuchar	66-72-71-66=275	−5	87,200
T25	(United States) Bubba Watson	68-70-71-66=275	−5	87,200
T30	(Canada) Corey Conners	72-68-66-70=276	−4	72,000
T30	(United States) Bryson DeChambeau	67-73-69-67=276	−4	72,000
T30	(United States) Andrew Landry	70-72-66-68=276	−4	72,000
T30	(United States) J. T. Poston	70-68-70-68=276	−4	72,000
T30	(United States) Jordan Spieth	68-69-68-71=276	−4	72,000
T35	(United States) Patrick Cantlay	73-72-65-67=277	−3	56,111
T35	(England) Tommy Fleetwood	72-67-73-65=277	−3	56,111
T35	(Spain) Sergio García	67-71-68-71=277	−3	56,111
T35	(South Korea) Im Sung-jae	67-68-69-73=277	−3	56,111
T35	(Northern Ireland) Graeme McDowell	68-70-70-69=277	−3	56,111
T35	(United States) Kevin Na	72-64-74-67=277	−3	56,111
T35	(Sweden) Henrik Stenson	69-69-70-69=277	−3	56,111
T35	(United States) Kevin Streelman	71-66-71-69=277	−3	56,111
T35	(Canada) Nick Taylor	69-70-67-71=277	−3	56,111
T44	(Canada) Mackenzie Hughes	68-71-70-69=278	−2	49,000
T44	(South Korea) Kang Sung-hoon	65-69-72-72=278	−2	49,000
T44	(United States) Jason Kokrak	69-68-71-70=278	−2	49,000
T47	(Northern Ireland) Rory McIlroy (c)	73-66-73-67=279	−1	46,500
T47	(United States) Patrick Reed	71-69-69-70=279	−1	46,500
T49	(United States) Tyler Duncan	74-70-66-70=280	E	44,000
T49	(Australia) Lucas Herbert	71-73-69-67=280	E	44,000
T49	(United States) Matthew Wolff	69-74-65-72=280	E	44,000
T52	(United States) Keegan Bradley	68-70-70-73=281	+1	40,000
T52	(United States) Max Homa	66-73-72-70=281	+1	40,000
T52	(Australia) Marc Leishman	70-69-69-73=281	+1	40,000
T52	(Chile) Joaquín Niemann	73-73-68-67=281	+1	40,000
T52	(Spain) Jon Rahm	70-74-71-66=281	+1	40,000
T57	(United States) Michael Thompson	70-74-69-69=282	+2	37,250
T57	(United States) Gary Woodland	71-69-73-69=282	+2	37,250
T59	(Norway) Viktor Hovland	67-75-72-69=283	+3	35,250
T59	(Thailand) Jazz Janewattananond	75-71-68-69=283	+3	35,250
T59	(Australia) Matt Jones	71-72-69-71=283	+3	35,250
T59	(Scotland) Robert MacIntyre	71-73-69-70=283	+3	35,250
T59	(Australia) Cameron Smith	72-72-71-68=283	+3	35,250
T59	(England) Matt Wallace	72-71-73-67=283	+3	35,250
T65	(United States) Tony Finau	70-68-72-74=284	+4	33,250
T65	(France) Victor Perez	73-71-70-70=284	+4	33,250
T67	(England) Paul Casey	71-78-69-67=285	+5	32,625
T67	(United States) Brandt Snedeker	73-71-72-69=285	+5	32,625
T69	(England) Tyrrell Hatton	72-69-73-73=287	+7	32,000
T69	(England) Ian Poulter	73-69-72-73=287	+7	32,000
T69	(England) Danny Willett	69-70-74-74=287	+7	32,000
T72	(Canada) Adam Hadwin	73-71-75-69=288	+8	31,375
T72	(Taiwan) Pan Cheng-tsung	72-74-70-72=288	+8	31,375
74	(Austria) Bernd Wiesberger	71-73-75-70=289	+9	31,000
T75	(China) Li Haotong	68-73-74-75=290	+10	30,625
T75	(South Africa) Shaun Norris	73-76-72-69=290	+10	30,625
77	(Sweden) Sebastian Söderberg	72-71-75-73=291	+11	30,250
78	(Spain) Rafa Cabrera-Bello	73-74-76-72=295	+15	30,000
