= Justin Thomas =

American professional golfer (born 1993)

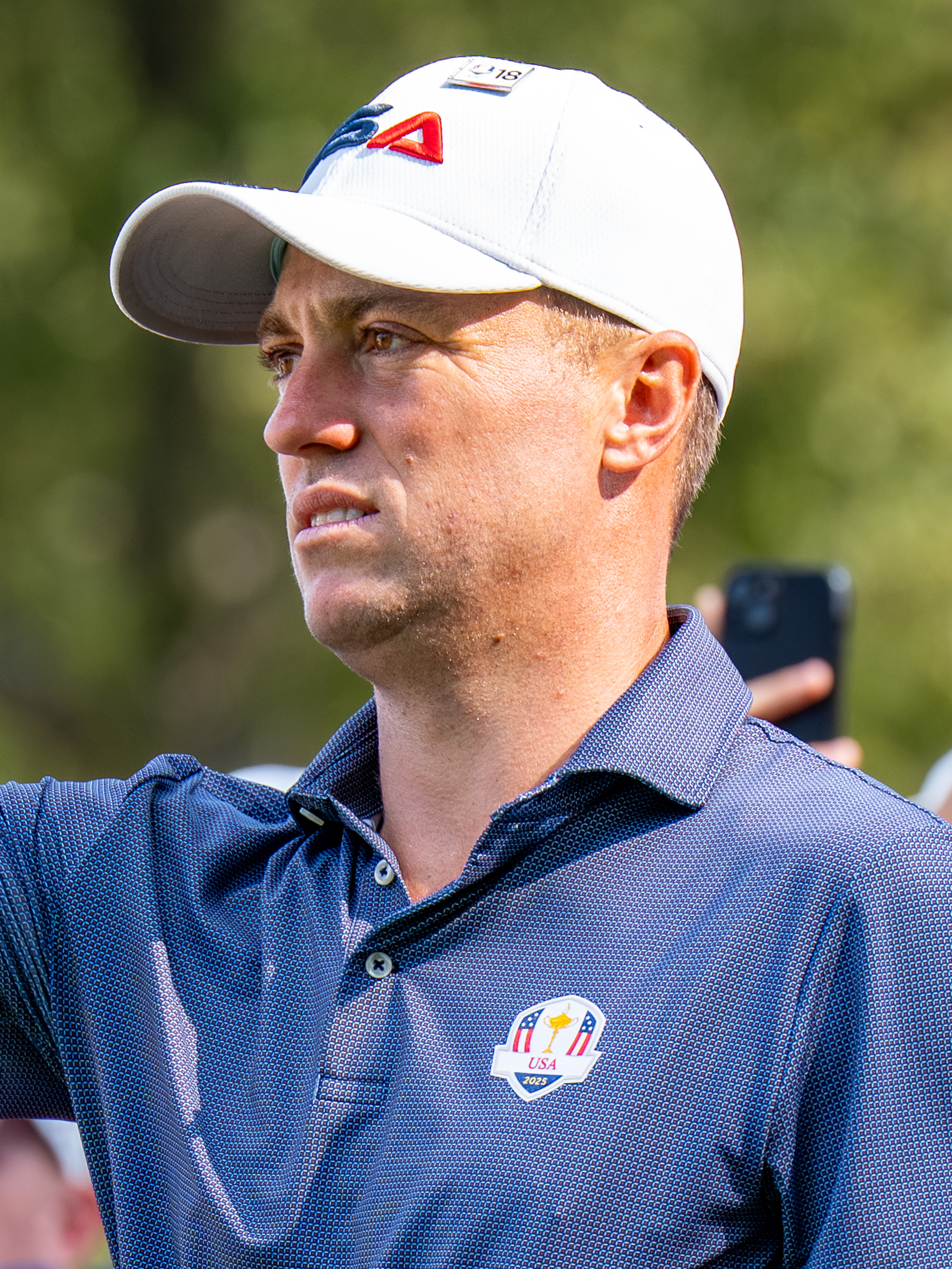
- Thomas at the 2025 Ryder Cup

Personal information
- Full name: Justin Louis Thomas
- Nickname: JT
- Nationality: United States
- Born: April 29, 1993 (age 33) Louisville, Kentucky, U.S.
- Height: 5 ft 10 in (1.78 m)
- Weight: 160 lb (73 kg; 11 st)
- Spouse: Jillian Wisniewski (m. 2022)
- Children: 1

Career
- Sport: Golf
- College: University of Alabama
- Turned professional: 2013
- Current tour: PGA Tour
- Former tour: Web.com Tour
- Professional wins: 18
- Highest ranking: 1 (May 13, 2018) (5 weeks)

Number of wins by tour
- PGA Tour: 16
- European Tour: 4
- Asian Tour: 2
- Korn Ferry Tour: 1
- Other: 1

Best results in major championships (wins: 2)
- Masters Tournament: 4th: 2020
- PGA Championship: Won: 2017, 2022
- U.S. Open: T8: 2020
- The Open Championship: T11: 2019

Achievements and awards
- Haskins Award: 2012
- Jack Nicklaus Award: 2012
- PGA Tour FedEx Cup winner: 2017
- PGA Tour money list winner: 2016–17, 2017–18, 2019–20
- PGA Tour Player of the Year: 2016–17
- PGA Player of the Year: 2017, 2020

Justin Louis Thomas (born April 29, 1993) is an American professional golfer who plays on the PGA Tour and is a former world number one. In 2017, Thomas experienced a breakout year, winning five PGA Tour events and the FedEx Cup championship. He has won two major golf championships, winning the PGA Championship in 2017 and 2022.

In May 2018, Thomas became the 21st player to top the Official World Golf Ranking. After winning his second major, Thomas struggled in 2023 and 2024, falling outside the top 30 in the world for the first time in over seven years. In 2025, Thomas returned to the winner's circle for the first time in nearly three years, winning the RBC Heritage and returning to the top 10 in the OWGR.

== Early life ==
Thomas was born on April 29, 1993, and raised in Louisville, Kentucky. He attended North Oldham Middle School. Prior to his junior year in high school, he played in the Wyndham Championship on the PGA Tour in August 2009 and became the third-youngest to make the cut in a PGA Tour event, at 16 years, 3 months and 24 days. Thomas graduated from St. Xavier High School in 2011.

Thomas' father, Mike Thomas, has been the head professional at the Harmony Landing Country Club in Goshen, Kentucky, since 1990. Thomas grew up an avid fan of his hometown Louisville Cardinals.

== Amateur career ==
Thomas played college golf at the University of Alabama, where he placed first six times for the Crimson Tide. As a freshman in 2012, he won the Haskins Award and the Jack Nicklaus Award as the most outstanding collegiate golfer. He was on the national championship team of 2013.

== Professional career ==
Thomas turned professional in 2013, deciding to forgo his final two years of college, and earned his tour card on the Web.com Tour through qualifying school. He won his first professional event at the 2014 Nationwide Children's Hospital Championship. Thomas finished fifth in the 2014 Web.com Tour regular season, and third after the Web.com Tour Finals, and earned his PGA Tour card for the 2015 season. In 2015, Thomas collected seven top-10s and 15 top-25s, with fourth-place finishes at the Quicken Loans National and Sanderson Farms Championship as his best results. He finished 32nd at the PGA Tour's FedEx Cup, losing the Rookie of the Year award to Daniel Berger.

On November 1, 2015, Thomas earned his first victory on the PGA Tour by winning the CIMB Classic in Kuala Lumpur, Malaysia, by a single stroke over Adam Scott. He overcame a double bogey on the 14th hole during the final round and holed a six-foot (1.8 m) par putt to claim the win by a stroke. Thomas had earlier shot a course-record 61 during the second round to contribute to a 26-under-par winning score.

=== 2016–17 PGA Tour: five wins, first major, FedEx Cup champion, Player of the Year ===
Thomas successfully defended his title at the CIMB Classic in October 2016 for his second tour win. Thomas won the SBS Tournament of Champions in January 2017 for his third PGA Tour win. In the following week's tournament, the Sony Open in Hawaii, Thomas became the seventh player in PGA Tour history to shoot a 59. During the first round, he opened his round with an eagle and needed to make an eagle on the ninth, his last hole of the day, to shoot 59. He became the youngest player to shoot a sub-60 round. Thomas finished with rounds of 64, 65, and 65 to win the tournament by 7 strokes. He set tournament records for 18, 36, 54, and 72 holes (59, 123, 188, and 253, respectively). He set PGA Tour records at 36 and 72 holes and tied the 54-hole record.

Hole	10	11	12	13	14	15	16	17	18	Out	1	2	3	4	5	6	7	8	9	In	Total
Par	4	3	4	4	4	4	4	3	5	35	4	4	4	3	4	4	3	4	5	35	70
Score	2	4	4	3	3	4	3	2	4	29	3	3	4	2	4	4	3	4	3	30	59

During the third round of the 2017 U.S. Open at Erin Hills, Thomas equalled the U.S. Open single-round record of 63. He eagled the last hole by hitting his 3-wood to 8 feet on the par-5 hole to finish at 9-under-par, also a U.S. Open record, passing the previous record held by Johnny Miller at Oakmont Country Club. In the fourth round, he played alongside Brian Harman in the final grouping, the first time he had done that in a major championship. He shot a three-over-par 75 and finished in a tie for ninth place.

In August 2017, Thomas won his first major, the 2017 PGA Championship, winning by two shots.

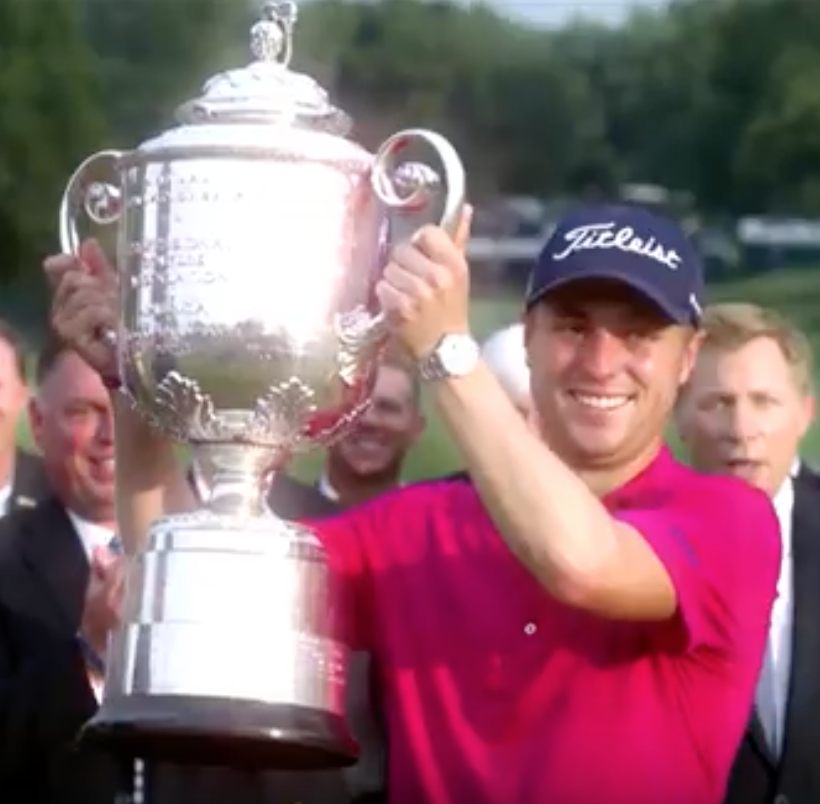
Thomas after winning the 2017 PGA Championship

At the Dell Technologies Championship, Thomas became just the fourth golfer to win five times, including a major, in a PGA Tour season since 1960 before his 25th birthday, joining Jack Nicklaus, Tiger Woods, and Jordan Spieth.

After finishing runner-up to Xander Schauffele at the Tour Championship, Thomas became the FedEx Cup champion on September 24, 2017.

=== 2017–18 PGA Tour ===
In October 2017, Thomas won the third event of the 2017–18 season, the CJ Cup in South Korea. He defeated Marc Leishman with a birdie on the second extra hole of a sudden-death playoff. The win was Thomas' seventh on the PGA Tour.

In February 2018, Thomas won for the eighth time on tour, claiming victory at The Honda Classic in Palm Beach Gardens, Florida. He birdied the final hole of regulation play to make a playoff with Luke List. Then on the first extra hole, Thomas made birdie again on the same hole, after a 5-wood from the fairway. List could not hole his birdie putt, after the missing the green to the right, resulting in Thomas winning the tournament. The win lifted Thomas to the top of the FedEx Cup standings and number three in world rankings.

The following week, Thomas lost in a sudden-death playoff to Phil Mickelson, at the WGC-Mexico Championship. He had been even par for the tournament after the first two rounds, but then shot 62–64 over the weekend for a total of 16 under par. To finish his final round, Thomas holed his second shot to the 18th for eagle. Thomas lost the playoff to par, after going over the back of the green in the first extra hole and failing to up and down for par. Thomas moved to number two in the world rankings, a career best ranking.

Thomas had another chance to claim the top spot in the world later on in March at the WGC-Match Play, but he was beaten 3 & 2 by Bubba Watson in the semi-finals. He then went on to lose the consolation match 5 & 3 to Alex Norén to finish in fourth place. The result extended his lead at the top of the FedEx Cup standings and reduced the gap on the world number one, Dustin Johnson.

After the 2018 Players Championship, Thomas replaced Johnson as the world number one golfer. He lost that ranking after four weeks when Johnson won the FedEx St. Jude Classic.

In September 2018, Thomas qualified for the U.S. team participating in the 2018 Ryder Cup. Europe defeated the U.S. team 17 1/2 to 10 1/2. Notwithstanding the loss, Thomas went 4–1–0. He won his singles match against Rory McIlroy.

=== 2018–19 PGA Tour ===
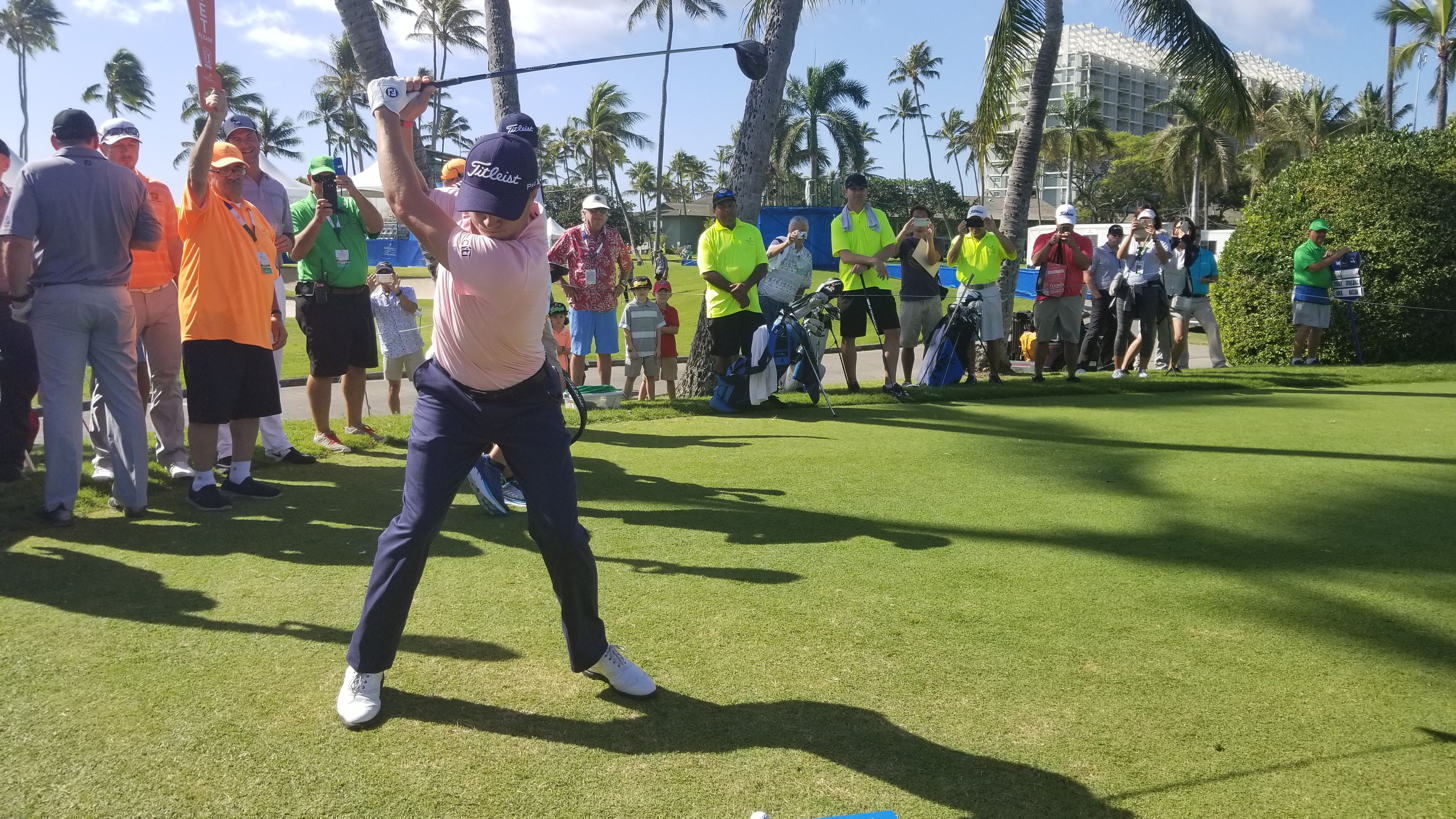
Thomas at the 2018 Sony Open in Hawaii.

On February 17, 2019, Thomas led the Genesis Open entering the final round. Gusty conditions led to Thomas shooting 75 and finishing second to champion J. B. Holmes. At one point, Thomas four-putted for a double bogey, the last three putts were inside 8 feet and the final miss was from 2 feet.

On August 18, 2019, Thomas shot 25-under-par and won the BMW Championship at Medinah Country Club outside of Chicago. This was the second leg of the three-tournament 2019 FedEx Cup Playoffs and put Thomas in the lead in the FedEx Cup standings heading into the Tour Championship at East Lake Golf Club.

=== 2019–20 PGA Tour ===
On October 20, 2019, Thomas won the CJ Cup in South Korea. This was his second win of the tournament in its three-year existence.

In December 2019, Thomas played on the U.S. team at the 2019 Presidents Cup at Royal Melbourne Golf Club in Australia. The U.S. team won 16–14. Thomas went 3–1–1 and lost his Sunday singles match against Cameron Smith.

On January 5, 2020, Thomas won the Sentry Tournament of Champions at Kapalua Resort in Maui, Hawaii for the second time. Thomas won in a playoff over Xander Schauffele and Patrick Reed.

On August 2, 2020, Thomas won the WGC-FedEx St. Jude Invitational at TPC Southwind in Tennessee by three strokes over four other players. This was the second time that Thomas had won the event and his 13th career victory on the PGA Tour. He came from four strokes behind overnight leader Brendon Todd to prevail on the final day. The win took Thomas to Number One in the Official World Golf Ranking for the second time in his career.

=== 2020–21 PGA Tour ===
On January 9, 2021, during the third round of the Sentry Tournament of Champions in Hawaii, Thomas drew criticism for using a homophobic slur to express anger over a missed putt. Sponsors Ralph Lauren and Woodford Reserve subsequently ended their relationships with him. Thomas apologized for the incident, describing his language as "inexcusable".

In March 2021, Thomas shot a final round four-under par 68 to win the 2021 Players Championship by one stroke over Lee Westwood.

In September 2021, Thomas played on the U.S. team in the 2021 Ryder Cup at Whistling Straits in Kohler, Wisconsin. The U.S. team won 19–9 and Thomas went 2–1–1 and won his Sunday singles match against Tyrrell Hatton.

=== 2021–22 PGA Tour: one win, second major ===
For the 2021–22 season, Thomas employed Jim "Bones" Mackay to replace his previous caddie, Jimmy Johnson. The last round of golf Johnson caddied for Thomas was at the 2021 Ryder Cup. Mackay stepped into the role at the CJ Cup.

On May 22, 2022, Thomas won his second major and second PGA Championship, defeating Will Zalatoris in a playoff, overcoming a PGA Championship record 7-shot deficit entering the day.

=== 2022–23 PGA Tour ===
Thomas qualified for the U.S. team at the 2022 Presidents Cup; he won all four matches paired with Jordan Spieth but lost in the singles.

In September 2023, Thomas played on the U.S. team in the 2023 Ryder Cup at Marco Simone Golf and Country Club in Guidonia, Rome, Italy. The European team won 16.5–11.5 and Thomas went 1–2–1 including a win in his Sunday singles match against Sepp Straka.

In November 2023, Thomas competed in the inaugural Netflix Cup, streamed as Netflix's first live sports broadcast. Thomas and Formula 1 driver Carlos Sainz Jr. played as a team, with the pair winning the event after Thomas won the "Closest to the Pin" style playoff, following 8 holes of scramble-format competition.

=== 2025 PGA Tour ===
In April 2025, Thomas won the RBC Heritage in a playoff against Andrew Novak. Thomas made a birdie putt from outside 20 feet to win for the first time since the 2022 PGA Championship. In round one, Thomas shot a 10-under 61 to tie the Harbour Town Golf Links record.

== Personal life ==
In 2019, Thomas revealed that he had been diagnosed with a form of skin cancer and underwent surgery to remove a melanoma from his leg. Since then, he has encouraged young athletes and fans to prioritize sun safety and regular dermatology checkups.

Thomas became engaged to fellow Kentucky native Jillian Wisniewski in 2021, and they married in 2022. They had their first child, a daughter, in 2024.

Thomas is a minority shareholder in the Premier League soccer club Leeds United.

== Amateur wins ==
- 2010 Terra Cotta Invitational
- 2012 Jones Cup Invitational

== Professional wins (18) ==
=== PGA Tour wins (16) ===
Legend
Major championships (2)
Players Championships (1)
World Golf Championships (2)
FedEx Cup playoff events (2)
Signature events (1)
Other PGA Tour (8)

No.	Date	Tournament	Winning score	To par	Margin of victory	Runner(s)-up
1	Nov 1, 2015	CIMB Classic^{1}	68-61-67-66=262	−26	1 stroke	(Australia) Adam Scott
2	Oct 23, 2016	CIMB Classic^{1} (2)	64-66-71-64=265	−23	3 strokes	(Japan) Hideki Matsuyama
3	Jan 8, 2017	SBS Tournament of Champions	67-67-67-69=270	−22	3 strokes	(Japan) Hideki Matsuyama
4	Jan 15, 2017	Sony Open in Hawaii	59-64-65-65=253	−27	7 strokes	(England) Justin Rose
5	Aug 13, 2017	PGA Championship	73-66-69-68=276	−8	2 strokes	(Italy) Francesco Molinari, (South Africa) Louis Oosthuizen, (United States) Patrick Reed
6	Sep 4, 2017	Dell Technologies Championship	71-67-63-66=267	−17	3 strokes	(United States) Jordan Spieth
7	Oct 22, 2017	CJ Cup	63-74-70-72=279	−9	Playoff	(Australia) Marc Leishman
8	Feb 25, 2018	The Honda Classic	67-72-65-68=272	−8	Playoff	(United States) Luke List
9	Aug 5, 2018	WGC-Bridgestone Invitational	65-64-67-69=265	−15	4 strokes	(United States) Kyle Stanley
10	Aug 18, 2019	BMW Championship	65-69-61-68=263	−25	3 strokes	(United States) Patrick Cantlay
11	Oct 20, 2019	CJ Cup (2)	68-63-70-67=268	−20	2 strokes	(New Zealand) Danny Lee
12	Jan 5, 2020	Sentry Tournament of Champions (2)	67-73-69-69=278	−14	Playoff	(United States) Patrick Reed, (United States) Xander Schauffele
13	Aug 2, 2020	WGC-FedEx St. Jude Invitational (2)	66-70-66-65=267	−13	3 strokes	(United States) Daniel Berger, (United States) Brooks Koepka, (England) Tom Lewis, (United States) Phil Mickelson
14	Mar 14, 2021	The Players Championship	71-71-64-68=274	−14	1 stroke	(England) Lee Westwood
15	May 22, 2022	PGA Championship (2)	67-67-74-67=275	−5	Playoff	(United States) Will Zalatoris
16	Apr 20, 2025	RBC Heritage	61-69-69-68=267	−17	Playoff	(United States) Andrew Novak

^{1}Co-sanctioned by the Asian Tour

PGA Tour playoff record (5–2)

No.	Year	Tournament	Opponent(s)	Result
1	2017	CJ Cup	(Australia) Marc Leishman	Won with birdie on second extra hole
2	2018	The Honda Classic	(United States) Luke List	Won with birdie on first extra hole
3	2018	WGC-Mexico Championship	(United States) Phil Mickelson	Lost to par on first extra hole
4	2020	Sentry Tournament of Champions	(United States) Patrick Reed, (United States) Xander Schauffele	Won with birdie on third extra hole Schauffele eliminated by birdie on first hole
5	2020	Workday Charity Open	(United States) Collin Morikawa	Lost to par on third extra hole
6	2022	PGA Championship	(United States) Will Zalatoris	Won three-hole aggregate playoff; Thomas: −2 (4-3-4=11), Zalatoris: x (4-4-x=x)
7	2025	RBC Heritage	(United States) Andrew Novak	Won with birdie on first extra hole

=== Web.com Tour wins (1) ===
Legend
Finals events (1)
Other Web.com Tour (0)

No.	Date	Tournament	Winning score	To par	Margin of victory	Runner-up
1	Sep 14, 2014	Nationwide Children's Hospital Championship	67-69-72-70=278	−6	Playoff	(South Africa) Richard Sterne

Web.com Tour playoff record (1–0)

No.	Year	Tournament	Opponent	Result
1	2014	Nationwide Children's Hospital Championship	(South Africa) Richard Sterne	Won with birdie on first extra hole

=== Other wins (1) ===
No.	Date	Tournament	Winning score	To par	Margin of victory	Runners-up
1	Dec 20, 2020	PNC Championship (with father Mike Thomas)	62-57=119	−25	1 stroke	(Fiji) Vijay Singh and son Qass Singh

== Major championships ==
=== Wins (2) ===
Year	Championship	54 holes	Winning score	Margin	Runner(s)-up
2017	PGA Championship	2 shot deficit	−8 (73-66-69-68=276)	2 strokes	(Italy) Francesco Molinari, (South Africa) Louis Oosthuizen, (United States) Patrick Reed
2022	PGA Championship (2)	7 shot deficit	−5 (67-67-74-67=275)	Playoff^{1}	(United States) Will Zalatoris

^{1}Defeated Will Zalatoris in a three-hole playoff: Thomas (4-3-4=11), Zalatoris (4-4-x=x).

=== Results timeline ===
Results not in chronological order in 2020.

Tournament	2014	2015	2016	2017	2018
Masters Tournament			T39	T22	T17
U.S. Open	CUT		T32	T9	T25
The Open Championship			T53	CUT	CUT
PGA Championship		T18	T66	1	T6

Tournament	2019	2020	2021	2022	2023	2024	2025	2026
Masters Tournament	T12	4	T21	T8	CUT	CUT	T36	T41
PGA Championship		T37	CUT	1	T65	T8	CUT	T4
U.S. Open	CUT	T8	T19	T37	CUT	CUT	CUT	T17
The Open Championship	T11	NT	T40	T53	CUT	T31	T34	T65

Win
Top 10
Did not play

CUT = missed the half-way cut
"T" indicates a tie for a place
NT = no tournament due to COVID-19 pandemic

=== Summary ===
Tournament	Wins	2nd	3rd	Top-5	Top-10	Top-25	Events	Cuts made
Masters Tournament	0	0	0	1	2	6	11	9
PGA Championship	2	0	0	3	5	6	11	9
U.S. Open	0	0	0	0	2	5	12	7
The Open Championship	0	0	0	0	0	1	10	7
Totals	2	0	0	4	9	18	44	32

- Most consecutive cuts made – 7 (2015 PGA – 2017 U.S. Open)
- Longest streak of top-10s – 2 (twice)

== The Players Championship ==
=== Wins (1) ===
Year	Championship	54 holes	Winning score	Margin	Runner-up
2021	The Players Championship	3 shot deficit	−14 (71-71-64-68=274)	1 stroke	(England) Lee Westwood

=== Results timeline ===
Tournament	2015	2016	2017	2018	2019	2020	2021	2022	2023	2024	2025	2026
The Players Championship	T24	T3	T75	T11	T35	C	1	T33	T60	CUT	T33	T8

Win
Top 10

CUT = missed the halfway cut
"T" indicates a tie for a place
C = canceled after the first round due to the COVID-19 pandemic

== World Golf Championships ==
=== Wins (2) ===
Year	Championship	54 holes	Winning score	Margin	Runner(s)-up
2018	WGC-Bridgestone Invitational	3 shot lead	−15 (65-64-67-69=265)	4 strokes	(United States) Kyle Stanley
2020	WGC-FedEx St. Jude Invitational (2)	4 shot deficit	−13 (66-70-66-65=267)	3 strokes	(United States) Daniel Berger, (United States) Brooks Koepka, (England) Tom Lewis, (United States) Phil Mickelson

=== Results timeline ===
Tournament	2015	2016	2017	2018	2019	2020	2021	2022
Championship		T35	T5	2	9	T6	T15	
Match Play		T61	T39	4	T24	NT^{1}	T42	T35
Invitational		T33	T28	1	T12	1	T26	
Champions	T27	T23				NT^{1}	NT^{1}	NT^{1}

^{1}Cancelled due to COVID-19 pandemic

Win
Top 10
Did not play

QF, R16, R32, R64 = Round in which player lost in match play
NT = no tournament
"T" = tied
Note that the Championship and Invitational were discontinued from 2022.

== PGA Tour career summary ==
Season	Starts	Cuts made	Wins (majors)	2nd	3rd	Top-10	Top-25	Best finish	Earnings ($)	Money list rank	Scoring avg (adj)	Scoring rank
2009	1	1	0	0	0	0	0	T78	n/a	–	70.56	
2012	1	1	0	0	0	0	0	T46	n/a	–	69.38	
2013	2	1	0	0	0	0	0	T30	n/a	–	69.57	
2013–14	7	3	0	0	0	1	1	T10	170,237	–	71.39	
2014–15	30	23	0	0	0	7	15	T4	2,278,564	37	70.10	16
2015–16	28	22	1	0	4	7	10	1	4,126,366	11	70.57	47
2016–17	25	19	5 (1)	1	0	12	14	1	9,921,560	1	69.36	3
2017–18	23	21	3	1	0	10	20	1	8,694,821	1	69.12	3
2018–19	20	18	1	1	3	7	14	1	5,013,084	8	69.47	5
2019–20	18	15	3	2	1	10	13	1	7,344,040	1	69.13	3
2020-21	23	21	1	1	1	7	15	1	6,537,153	5	69.773	6
2021-22	21	19	1 (1)	0	3	10	13	1	6,829,576	9	69.493	7
2022-23	21	15	0	0	1	4	11	3	3,566,403	52	70.520	58
2024	20	16	0	1	2	6	10	2	5,223,561	21	70.200	17
2025	14	12	1	3	0	6	6	1	8,795,520	5	70.293	22
Career*	275	225	16 (2)	11	14	94	142	1	$44,085,824	18		

*As of the 2020–21 season.

== U.S. national team appearances ==
Amateur

- Junior Ryder Cup: 2010 (winners)
- Eisenhower Trophy: 2012 (winners)
- Palmer Cup: 2012, 2013 (winners)
- Walker Cup: 2013 (winners)

Professional

- Presidents Cup: 2017 (winners), 2019 (winners), 2022 (winners), 2026 (winners)
- Ryder Cup: 2018, 2021 (winners), 2023, 2025

Ryder Cup points record
2018	2021	2023	2025	Total
4	2.5	1.5	2	10

== In popular culture ==
He appears on the cover of the 2020 video game PGA Tour 2K21.

== See also ==
- List of men's major championships winning golfers
- 2014 Web.com Tour Finals graduates
- Lowest rounds of golf
