= 2018 Players Championship =

Tournament information
- Dates: May 10–13, 2018
- Location: Ponte Vedra Beach, Florida; 30.198°N 81.394°W
- Courses: TPC Sawgrass, Stadium Course
- Tour: PGA Tour

Statistics
- Par: 72
- Length: 7,189 yards (6,574 m)
- Field: 144 players, 80 after first cut 71 after second cut
- Cut: 143 (−1)
- Prize fund: $11 million
- Winner's share: $1.98 million

Champion
- (United States) Webb Simpson
- 270 (−18)

Location map
- Location in the United States Location in Florida

The 2018 Players Championship was a professional golf tournament, held from May 10–13 at TPC Sawgrass in Ponte Vedra Beach, Florida. The flagship event of the PGA Tour, this was the 45th edition of The Players Championship, and the 37th edition held at the Stadium Course at TPC Sawgrass. The tournament was won by Webb Simpson, four strokes ahead of three runners-up.

Defending champion Kim Si-woo opened with a five-under 67, but finished 15 strokes back, tied for 63rd place.

This was the twelfth consecutive Players Championship held in May; it returned to March in 2019.

== Venue ==
=== Course layout ===
The 2018 Players Championship
Tee	Rating/Slope	1	2	3	4	5	6	7	8	9	Out	10	11	12	13	14	15	16	17	18	In	Total
Yards	76.4 / 155	423	532	177	384	471	393	451	237	583	3,651	424	558	302	181	481	470	523	137	462	3,538	7,189
Par		4	5	3	4	4	4	4	3	5	36	4	5	4	3	4	4	5	3	4	36	72

== Field ==
The field consisted of 144 players meeting the following criteria. Each player is listed according to the first category by which he qualified with additional categories in which he qualified shown in parentheses.

1. Winners of PGA Tour events since last Players

Ryan Armour, Daniel Berger (2,9), Patrick Cantlay (2,9), Austin Cook, Jason Day (2,4,5,7,8,9), Bryson DeChambeau (2,9), Jason Dufner (2,4,8), Brice Garnett, Billy Horschel (2), Dustin Johnson (2,4,7,9,13), Kim Si-woo (2,5,9), Kevin Kisner (2,9), Patton Kizzire (2,13), Satoshi Kodaira (9), Brooks Koepka (2,4,9), Andrew Landry (13), Marc Leishman (2,8,9), Hideki Matsuyama (2,7,9), Rory McIlroy (2,4,6,8,9), Phil Mickelson (2,4,7,9,13), Grayson Murray (2), Pat Perez (2,9), Scott Piercy (2), Ted Potter Jr., Ian Poulter (2,9), Jon Rahm (2,9,13), Patrick Reed (2,4,9,13), Justin Rose (2,4,9,13), Xander Schauffele (2,6,9), Jordan Spieth (2,4,6,9), Kyle Stanley (2,9), Brendan Steele (2,9), Henrik Stenson (2,4,9), Chris Stroud (2), Justin Thomas (2,4,9,13), Jhonattan Vegas (2), Bubba Watson (2,4,9,13), Gary Woodland (2,9)

- Paul Casey (2,9) did not play due to injury.

2. Top 125 from previous season's FedEx Cup points list

An Byeong-hun, Blayne Barber, Ryan Blaum, Jonas Blixt, Dominic Bozzelli, Keegan Bradley, Scott Brown, Wesley Bryan, Rafa Cabrera-Bello (9), Chad Campbell, Bud Cauley, Kevin Chappell (9), Stewart Cink, Harris English, Derek Fathauer, Tony Finau (9,13), Martin Flores, Rickie Fowler (5,9), Sergio García (4,9), Robert Garrigus, Brian Gay, Lucas Glover, Branden Grace (9), Cody Gribble, Emiliano Grillo, Bill Haas, Adam Hadwin (9), James Hahn, Brian Harman (9), Russell Henley (9), J. J. Henry, Charley Hoffman (9), J. B. Holmes, Charles Howell III, Mackenzie Hughes, John Huh, Zach Johnson (4), Kang Sung-hoon, Michael Kim, Kim Meen-whee, Chris Kirk, Russell Knox (7), Jason Kokrak, Kelly Kraft, Matt Kuchar (9), Anirban Lahiri, Martin Laird, Danny Lee, David Lingmerth (8), Luke List, Jamie Lovemark, Ben Martin, William McGirt (8), Francesco Molinari (9), Ryan Moore, Kevin Na, Geoff Ogilvy, Sean O'Hair, Louis Oosthuizen (9), Rod Pampling, Pan Cheng-tsung, D. A. Points, Chez Reavie, Patrick Rodgers, Rory Sabbatini, Ollie Schniederjans, Charl Schwartzel, Adam Scott (7), Webb Simpson (9), Cameron Smith (9), Brandt Snedeker, J. J. Spaun, Scott Stallings, Robert Streb, Kevin Streelman, Steve Stricker, Hudson Swafford, Nick Taylor, Vaughn Taylor, Kevin Tway, Tyrone van Aswegen, Harold Varner III, Jimmy Walker (4), Nick Watney, Richy Werenski

- Graham DeLaet, Luke Donald, Brandon Hagy, Jim Herman, Morgan Hoffmann, and Camilo Villegas did not play.
- Noh Seung-yul was unable to compete due to a military obligation in South Korea.

3. Top 125 (medical)

Ryan Palmer, Michael Thompson

4. Major champions from the past five years

Martin Kaymer (5), Danny Willett

5. Players Championship winners from the past five years

Tiger Woods

6. The Tour Championship winners from the past three years

7. World Golf Championship winners from the past three years

Shane Lowry

8. Memorial Tournament and Arnold Palmer Invitational winners from the past three years

9. Top 50 from the Official World Golf Ranking

Kiradech Aphibarnrat, Ross Fisher, Matt Fitzpatrick, Tommy Fleetwood, Tyrrell Hatton, Alexander Lévy, Li Haotong, Alex Norén

10. Senior Players champion from prior year

Scott McCarron

11. Web.com Tour money leader from prior season

Chesson Hadley (12)

12. Money leader during the Web.com Tour Finals

13. Top 10 current year FedEx Cup points leaders

14. Remaining positions and alternates filled through current year FedEx Cup standings

Brandon Harkins, Tom Hoge, Beau Hossler, Keith Mitchell, Trey Mullinax

== Round summaries ==
=== First round ===
Thursday, May 10, 2018

Kim Si-woo shot 67 (−5), the lowest first round score by a defending champion since the event moved to Florida; six players were a shot better at 66.

Place	Player	Score	To par
T1	(United States) Patrick Cantlay	66	−6
T1	(United States) Chesson Hadley	66	−6
T1	(United States) Dustin Johnson	66	−6
T1	(United States) Matt Kuchar	66	−6
T1	(Sweden) Alex Norén	66	−6
T1	(United States) Webb Simpson	66	−6
T7	(South Korea) Kim Si-woo	67	−5
T7	(United States) Andrew Landry	67	−5
T7	(United States) Keith Mitchell	67	−5
T7	(South Africa) Rory Sabbatini	67	−5
T7	(United States) Steve Stricker	67	−5
T7	(Venezuela) Jhonattan Vegas	67	−5

=== Second round ===
Friday, May 11, 2018

Webb Simpson tied the course record with a round of 63 (−9) to open up a five-shot lead. Simpson had six consecutive birdies on holes 11–16 which also tied a tournament record. He was 11-under on his round until his tee shot found the water on the par-3 17th and made double bogey. His score of 129 (−15) after 36 holes tied Jason Day (2016) for the tournament record, while his five-shot lead set a new record.

For the second consecutive year, at least eighty players made the 36-hole cut, which invoked a 54-hole cut.

Place	Player	Score	To par
1	(United States) Webb Simpson	66-63=129	−15
T2	(United States) Patrick Cantlay	66-68=134	−10
T2	(New Zealand) Danny Lee	68-66=134	−10
T2	(South Africa) Charl Schwartzel	68-66=134	−10
T5	(United States) Chesson Hadley	66-69=135	−9
T5	(United States) Charles Howell III	68-67=135	−9
T5	(Sweden) Alex Norén	66-69=135	−9
T8	(Australia) Jason Day	69-67=136	−8
T8	(United States) Xander Schauffele	68-68=136	−8
T8	(United States) Steve Stricker	67-69=136	−8

=== Third round ===
Saturday, May 12, 2018

Place	Player	Score	To par
1	(United States) Webb Simpson	66-63-68=197	−19
2	(New Zealand) Danny Lee	68-66-70=204	−12
3	(United States) Dustin Johnson	66-71-69=206	−10
T4	(Australia) Jason Day	69-67-71=207	−9
T4	(United States) Jason Dufner	72-69-66=207	−9
T4	(United States) Xander Schauffele	68-68-71=207	−9
T4	(South Africa) Charl Schwartzel	68-66-73=207	−9
T4	(United States) Jimmy Walker	69-68-70=207	−9
T9	(United States) Patrick Cantlay	66-68-74=208	−8
T9	(England) Tommy Fleetwood	69-71-68=208	−8
T9	(United States) Matt Kuchar	66-71-71=208	−8
T9	(England) Ian Poulter	70-69-69=208	−8
T9	(United States) Jordan Spieth	75-68-65=208	−8
T9	(United States) Harold Varner III	71-67-70=208	−8
T9	(United States) Tiger Woods	72-71-65=208	−8

=== Final round ===
Sunday, May 13, 2018

Champion
(c) = past champion

Place	Player	Score	To par	Money ($)
1	(United States) Webb Simpson	66-63-68-73=270	−18	1,980,000
T2	(United States) Xander Schauffele	68-68-71-67=274	−14	821,333
T2	(South Africa) Charl Schwartzel	68-66-73-67=274	−14	821,333
T2	(United States) Jimmy Walker	69-68-70-67=274	−14	821,333
T5	(Australia) Jason Day (c)	69-67-71-68=275	−13	418,000
T5	(United States) Jason Dufner	72-69-66-68=275	−13	418,000
T7	(United States) Keegan Bradley	69-69-72-66=276	−12	331,375
T7	(England) Tommy Fleetwood	69-71-68-68=276	−12	331,375
T7	(New Zealand) Danny Lee	68-66-70-72=276	−12	331,375
T7	(United States) Harold Varner III	71-67-70-68=276	−12	331,375

Leaderboard below the top 10
Place	Player	Score	To par	Money ($)
T11	(United States) Chesson Hadley	66-69-75-67=277	−11	225,500
T11	(United States) Brooks Koepka	70-70-74-63=277	−11	225,500
T11	(England) Ian Poulter	70-69-69-69=277	−11	225,500
T11	(Australia) Adam Scott (c)	69-68-72-68=277	−11	225,500
T11	(United States) Justin Thomas	73-70-68-66=277	−11	225,500
T11	(United States) Tiger Woods (c)	72-71-65-69=277	−11	225,500
T17	(Spain) Rafa Cabrera-Bello	71-71-67-69=278	−10	148,866
T17	(United States) Charles Howell III	68-67-74-69=278	−10	148,866
T17	(United States) Dustin Johnson	66-71-69-72=278	−10	148,866
T17	(United States) Matt Kuchar (c)	66-71-71-70=278	−10	148,866
T17	(United States) Jamie Lovemark	76-67-68-67=278	−10	148,866
T17	(Sweden) Alex Norén	66-69-77-66=278	−10	148,866
T23	(United States) Scott Brown	70-71-69-69=279	−9	92,714
T23	(United States) Patrick Cantlay	66-68-74-71=279	−9	92,714
T23	(United States) Ryan Palmer	74-67-69-69=279	−9	92,714
T23	(England) Justin Rose	68-72-73-66=279	−9	92,714
T23	(Sweden) Henrik Stenson (c)	68-70-71-70=279	−9	92,714
T23	(United States) Steve Stricker	67-69-73-70=279	−9	92,714
T23	(United States) Richy Werenski	70-71-68-70=279	−9	92,714
T30	(South Korea) An Byeong-hun	71-70-69-70=280	−8	65,371
T30	(Thailand) Kiradech Aphibarnrat	71-71-71-67=280	−8	65,371
T30	(United States) Cody Gribble	68-71-72-69=280	−8	65,371
T30	(United States) Ryan Moore	71-70-73-66=280	−8	65,371
T30	(United States) Grayson Murray	72-68-69-71=280	−8	65,371
T30	(United States) Chez Reavie	71-71-69-69=280	−8	65,371
T30	(South Africa) Rory Sabbatini	67-71-71-71=280	−8	65,371
T37	(United States) Bryson DeChambeau	70-67-73-71=281	−7	50,600
T37	(Argentina) Emiliano Grillo	69-71-72-69=281	−7	50,600
T37	(United States) Billy Horschel	68-70-73-70=281	−7	50,600
T37	(United States) Nick Watney	70-72-72-67=281	−7	50,600
T41	(United States) Brice Garnett	69-69-73-71=282	−6	40,700
T41	(United States) Ted Potter Jr.	70-70-72-70=282	−6	40,700
T41	(United States) Patrick Reed	72-68-70-72=282	−6	40,700
T41	(United States) Jordan Spieth	75-68-65-74=282	−6	40,700
T41	(Venezuela) Jhonattan Vegas	67-72-70-73=282	−6	40,700
T46	(United States) Austin Cook	72-70-71-70=283	−5	27,980
T46	(England) Matt Fitzpatrick	72-70-70-71=283	−5	27,980
T46	(South Africa) Branden Grace	69-71-73-70=283	−5	27,980
T46	(United States) Beau Hossler	70-69-73-71=283	−5	27,980
T46	(United States) Chris Kirk	70-71-70-72=283	−5	27,980
T46	(United States) Jason Kokrak	72-69-71-71=283	−5	27,980
T46	(Republic of Ireland) Shane Lowry	75-68-69-71=283	−5	27,980
T46	(United States) Kevin Na	69-71-72-71=283	−5	27,980
T46	(Taiwan) Pan Cheng-tsung	68-70-76-69=283	−5	27,980
T46	(United States) Chris Stroud	70-70-72-71=283	−5	27,980
T46	(United States) Kevin Tway	70-72-72-69=283	−5	27,980
T57	(United States) Daniel Berger	74-68-72-70=284	−4	24,310
T57	(United States) Tony Finau	70-72-71-71=284	−4	24,310
T57	(Canada) Adam Hadwin	72-68-71-73=284	−4	24,310
T57	(Canada) Mackenzie Hughes	76-67-68-73=284	−4	24,310
T57	(Scotland) Martin Laird	72-71-70-71=284	−4	24,310
T57	(United States) Bubba Watson	68-71-73-72=284	−4	24,310
T63	(South Korea) Kim Si-woo (c)	67-72-74-72=285	−3	23,320
T63	(Australia) Marc Leishman	71-71-67-76=285	−3	23,320
T63	(Spain) Jon Rahm	68-70-77-70=285	−3	23,320
66	(South Africa) Tyrone van Aswegen	74-68-70-74=286	−2	22,880
T67	(United States) Brandon Harkins	75-68-73-71=287	−1	22,440
T67	(United States) J. J. Henry	72-71-69-75=287	−1	22,440
T67	(United States) Andrew Landry	67-75-71-74=287	−1	22,440
70	(Spain) Sergio García (c)	68-69-75-76=288	E	22,000
71	(England) Ross Fisher	70-73-73-73=289	+1	21,780
T72	(United States) Brian Gay	72-71-74=217	+1	21,780
T72	(United States) Lucas Glover	68-71-78=217	+1	21,780
T72	(United States) Tom Hoge	70-69-78=217	+1	21,780
T75	(United States) Zach Johnson	71-69-78=218	+2	20,790
T75	(United States) Ollie Schniederjans	68-71-79=218	+2	20,790
T77	(United States) Ryan Blaum	71-72-77=220	+4	20,350
T77	(United States) Keith Mitchell	67-75-78=220	+4	20,350
T79	(United States) Brendan Steele	72-69-81=222	+6	19,910
T79	(Canada) Nick Taylor	69-74-79=222	+6	19,910
CUT	(Sweden) Jonas Blixt	75-69=144	E	
CUT	(United States) Wesley Bryan	71-73=144	E	
CUT	(United States) Kevin Chappell	72-72=144	E	
CUT	(United States) John Huh	69-75=144	E	
CUT	(India) Anirban Lahiri	69-75=144	E	
CUT	(France) Alexander Lévy	73-71=144	E	
CUT	(United States) Luke List	70-74=144	E	
CUT	(United States) J. J. Spaun	71-73=144	E	
CUT	(United States) Rickie Fowler (c)	74-71=145	+1	
CUT	(United States) Robert Garrigus	75-70=145	+1	
CUT	(United States) James Hahn	73-72=145	+1	
CUT	(United States) Russell Henley	72-73=145	+1	
CUT	(Germany) Martin Kaymer (c)	71-74=145	+1	
CUT	(Northern Ireland) Rory McIlroy	71-74=145	+1	
CUT	(United States) Kyle Stanley	75-70=145	+1	
CUT	(United States) Robert Streb	73-72=145	+1	
CUT	(United States) Kevin Streelman	70-75=145	+1	
CUT	(United States) Ryan Armour	73-73=146	+2	
CUT	(United States) Bud Cauley	73-73=146	+2	
CUT	(England) Tyrrell Hatton	75-71=146	+2	
CUT	(United States) Charley Hoffman	71-75=146	+2	
CUT	(Scotland) Russell Knox	74-72=146	+2	
CUT	(United States) Kelly Kraft	74-72=146	+2	
CUT	(Italy) Francesco Molinari	73-73=146	+2	
CUT	(United States) Pat Perez	76-70=146	+2	
CUT	(United States) Scott Piercy	77-69=146	+2	
CUT	(United States) Hudson Swafford	75-71=146	+2	
CUT	(United States) Gary Woodland	74-72=146	+2	
CUT	(United States) Stewart Cink	75-72=147	+3	
CUT	(United States) J. B. Holmes	75-72=147	+3	
CUT	(South Korea) Kim Meen-whee	75-72=147	+3	
CUT	(United States) Kevin Kisner	77-70=147	+3	
CUT	(United States) Patton Kizzire	72-75=147	+3	
CUT	(Japan) Satoshi Kodaira	74-73=147	+3	
CUT	(Sweden) David Lingmerth	75-72=147	+3	
CUT	(United States) William McGirt	73-74=147	+3	
CUT	(United States) Trey Mullinax	72-75=147	+3	
CUT	(United States) Vaughn Taylor	72-75=147	+3	
CUT	(United States) Blayne Barber	76-72=148	+4	
CUT	(United States) Chad Campbell	74-74=148	+4	
CUT	(United States) Harris English	77-71=148	+4	
CUT	(United States) Martin Flores	80-68=148	+4	
CUT	(United States) Bill Haas	74-74=148	+4	
CUT	(Japan) Hideki Matsuyama	79-69=148	+4	
CUT	(South Africa) Louis Oosthuizen	78-71=149	+5	
CUT	(United States) D. A. Points	75-74=149	+5	
CUT	(United States) Patrick Rodgers	73-76=149	+5	
CUT	(United States) Scott Stallings	75-75=150	+6	
CUT	(United States) Michael Thompson	76-74=150	+6	
CUT	(United States) Dominic Bozzelli	77-74=151	+7	
CUT	(United States) Ben Martin	78-73=151	+7	
CUT	(Australia) Cameron Smith	76-75=151	+7	
CUT	(England) Danny Willett	74-77=151	+7	
CUT	(United States) Scott McCarron	79-73=152	+8	
CUT	(United States) Phil Mickelson (c)	79-73=152	+8	
CUT	(Australia) Geoff Ogilvy	78-74=152	+8	
CUT	(United States) Derek Fathauer	77-76=153	+9	
CUT	(United States) Brian Harman	74-80=154	+10	
CUT	(United States) Michael Kim	78-76=154	+10	
CUT	(Australia) Rod Pampling	74-80=154	+10	
CUT	(United States) Brandt Snedeker	82-72=154	+10	
CUT	(South Korea) Kang Sung-hoon	78-77=155	+11	
CUT	(China) Li Haotong	76-80=156	+12	
WD	(United States) Sean O'Hair	79	+7	

==== Scorecard ====
Final round

Hole	1	2	3	4	5	6	7	8	9	10	11	12	13	14	15	16	17	18
Par	4	5	3	4	4	4	4	3	5	4	5	4	3	4	4	5	3	4
(United States) Simpson	−19	−19	−19	−19	−19	−19	−20	−19	−19	−18	−19	−19	−19	−19	−19	−20	−20	−18
(United States) Schauffele	−9	−10	−10	−11	−11	−11	−10	−10	−11	−11	−12	−13	−13	−13	−13	−13	−13	−14
(South Africa) Schwartzel	−9	−10	−9	−9	−9	−9	−10	−10	−10	−10	−10	−11	−12	−12	−12	−13	−13	−14
(United States) Walker	−9	−10	−10	−10	−10	−11	−11	−11	−11	−11	−12	−13	−14	−14	−14	−14	−14	−14
(Australia) Day	−9	−10	−10	−11	−11	−11	−11	−11	−13	−13	−13	−13	−13	−13	−13	−13	−13	−13
(United States) Dufner	−10	−11	−11	−11	−11	−12	−13	−12	−13	−13	−14	−14	−14	−14	−14	−14	−14	−13
(New Zealand) Lee	−12	−13	−14	−14	−14	−14	−14	−14	−14	−14	−14	−13	−13	−13	−13	−12	−12	−12
(United States) Woods	−8	−8	−9	−10	−11	−11	−11	−11	−12	−12	−13	−14	−14	−13	−13	−13	−11	−11

Cumulative tournament scores, relative to par

Eagle	Birdie	Bogey	Double bogey
