= 2018 WGC-Bridgestone Invitational =

Tournament information
- Dates: August 2–5, 2018
- Location: Akron, Ohio, U.S. 41.008°N 81.508°W
- Courses: Firestone Country Club; South Course
- Tours: PGA Tour; European Tour

Statistics
- Par: 70
- Length: 7,400 yards (6,767 m)
- Field: 71 players
- Cut: None
- Prize fund: $10,000,000
- Winner's share: $1,700,000

Champion
- (United States) Justin Thomas
- 265 (−15)
- Location in the United States Location in Ohio

The 2018 WGC-Bridgestone Invitational was a professional golf tournament held August 2–5 on the South Course of Firestone Country Club in Akron, Ohio. It was the 20th WGC-Bridgestone Invitational tournament, and the third of the World Golf Championships events in 2018.

== Venue ==
=== Course layout ===
The South Course was designed by Bert Way and redesigned by Robert Trent Jones in 1960.

Hole	Yards	Par	Hole	Yards	Par
1	399	4	10	410	4
2	526	5	11	418	4
3	442	4	12	180	3
4	471	4	13	471	4
5	200	3	14	467	4
6	469	4	15	221	3
7	219	3	16	667	5
8	482	4	17	400	4
9	494	4	18	464	4
Out	3,702	35	In	3,698	35
Source:		Total		7,400	70

== Field ==
The field consisted of players drawn primarily from the Official World Golf Ranking and the winners of the worldwide tournaments with the strongest fields.

1. Playing members of the 2017 United States and International Presidents Cup teams.

Daniel Berger (2,3), Kevin Chappell (2,3), Jason Day (2,3,4), Rickie Fowler (2,3), Branden Grace (2,3,4), Emiliano Grillo, Charley Hoffman (2,3), Dustin Johnson (2,3,4), Kim Si-woo, Kevin Kisner (2,3), Brooks Koepka (2,3,4), Matt Kuchar (2,3), Anirban Lahiri, Marc Leishman (2,3,4), Hideki Matsuyama (2,3,4), Phil Mickelson (2,3,4), Louis Oosthuizen (2,3), Patrick Reed (2,3,4), Charl Schwartzel (2,3), Adam Scott, Jordan Spieth (2,3), Justin Thomas (2,3,4), Jhonattan Vegas

Adam Hadwin did not play.

2. The top 50 players from the Official World Golf Ranking as of July 23, 2018.

Kiradech Aphibarnrat (3), Rafa Cabrera-Bello (3), Patrick Cantlay (3,4), Paul Casey (3,4), Bryson DeChambeau (3,4), Tony Finau (3), Ross Fisher (3), Matt Fitzpatrick (3,4), Tommy Fleetwood (3,4), Sergio García (3,4), Brian Harman (3), Tyrrell Hatton (3,4), Zach Johnson, Satoshi Kodaira (3,4), Li Haotong (3,4), Luke List (3), Rory McIlroy (3,4), Francesco Molinari (3,4), Kevin Na (3,4), Alex Norén (3,4), Pat Perez (3,4), Ian Poulter (3,4), Jon Rahm (3,4), Xander Schauffele (3,4), Webb Simpson (3,4), Cameron Smith (3,5), Kyle Stanley (3), Henrik Stenson (3,4), Bubba Watson (3,4), Gary Woodland (3,4), Tiger Woods (3)

Justin Rose (3,4,5) did not play.

3. The top 50 players from the Official World Golf Ranking as of July 30, 2018.

An Byeong-hun

4. Tournament winners, whose victories are considered official, of tournaments from the Federation Tours since the prior season's Bridgestone Invitational with an Official World Golf Ranking Strength of Field Rating of 115 points or more.

Alexander Björk, Austin Cook, Paul Dunne, Patton Kizzire, Russell Knox, Andrew Landry, Thorbjørn Olesen, Wade Ormsby, Ted Potter Jr., Shubhankar Sharma, Brendan Steele, Brandon Stone, Aaron Wise

5. The winner of selected tournaments from each of the following tours

- Asian Tour: Indonesian Masters (2017) – Justin Rose, also qualified under categories 2, 3 and 4
- PGA Tour of Australasia: Australian PGA Championship (2017) – Cameron Smith, also qualified under categories 2 and 3
- Japan Golf Tour: Bridgestone Open (2017) – Ryuko Tokimatsu
- Japan Golf Tour: Japan Golf Tour Championship (2018) – Kodai Ichihara
- Sunshine Tour: Dimension Data Pro-Am – Jaco Ahlers

== Round summaries ==
=== First round ===
Thursday, August 2, 2018

Ian Poulter shot an 8-under-par 62 to lead by one stroke over Rickie Fowler and Kyle Stanley. Defending champion Hideki Matsuyama was 5 strokes back at −3. Tiger Woods, eight-time winner of the event, was 4 strokes back at −4. His last PGA Tour win was at the 2013 event. The scoring average of 68.37 was the lowest opening round of a PGA Tour event this season.

Place	Player	Score	To par
1	(England) Ian Poulter	62	−8
T2	(United States) Rickie Fowler	63	−7
T2	(United States) Kyle Stanley	63	−7
T4	(United States) Patrick Cantlay	64	−6
T4	(South Korea) Kim Si-woo	64	−6
T4	(Spain) Jon Rahm	64	−6
T7	(Australia) Jason Day	65	−5
T7	(India) Anirban Lahiri	65	−5
T7	(Australia) Marc Leishman	65	−5
T7	(United States) Luke List	65	−5
T7	(Northern Ireland) Rory McIlroy	65	−5
T7	(United States) Kevin Na	65	−5
T7	(United States) Justin Thomas	65	−5

=== Second round ===
Friday, August 3, 2018

Place	Player	Score	To par
T1	(England) Tommy Fleetwood	66-63=129	−11
T1	(England) Ian Poulter	62-67=129	−11
T1	(United States) Justin Thomas	65-64=129	−11
T4	(Australia) Jason Day	65-66=131	−9
T4	(United States) Kyle Stanley	63-68=131	−9
T6	(South Korea) Kim Si-woo	64-68=132	−8
T6	(Northern Ireland) Rory McIlroy	65-67=132	−8
T8	(China) Li Haotong	66-67=133	−7
T8	(United States) Luke List	65-68=133	−7
T10	(United States) Tony Finau	68-66=134	−6
T10	(Australia) Marc Leishman	65-69=134	−6
T10	(South Africa) Louis Oosthuizen	68-66=134	−6
T10	(Spain) Jon Rahm	64-70=134	−6
T10	(United States) Webb Simpson	69-65=134	−6
T10	(United States) Tiger Woods	66-68=134	−6

=== Third round ===
Saturday, August 4, 2018

Place	Player	Score	To par
1	(United States) Justin Thomas	65-64-67=196	−14
T2	(Northern Ireland) Rory McIlroy	65-67-67=199	−11
T2	(England) Ian Poulter	62-67-70=199	−11
4	(Australia) Jason Day	65-66-69=200	−10
T5	(Australia) Marc Leishman	65-69-67=201	−9
T5	(United States) Kyle Stanley	63-68-70=201	−9
T7	(United States) Rickie Fowler	63-74-65=202	−8
T7	(Spain) Jon Rahm	64-70-68=202	−8
T9	(England) Tommy Fleetwood	66-63-74=203	−7
T9	(South Africa) Louis Oosthuizen	68-66-69=203	−7

=== Final round ===
Sunday, August 5, 2018

Place	Player	Score	To par	Prize money (US$)
1	(United States) Justin Thomas	65-64-67-69=265	−15	1,700,000
2	(United States) Kyle Stanley	63-68-70-68=269	−11	1,072,000
T3	(United States) Dustin Johnson	69-71-66-64=270	−10	510,000
T3	(Denmark) Thorbjørn Olesen	71-67-68-64=270	−10	510,000
5	(United States) Brooks Koepka	66-70-68-67=271	−9	357,000
T6	(United States) Patrick Cantlay	64-72-68-68=272	−8	241,375
T6	(India) Anirban Lahiri	65-70-69-68=272	−8	241,375
T6	(Northern Ireland) Rory McIlroy	65-67-67-73=272	−8	241,375
T6	(United States) Aaron Wise	67-71-67-67=272	−8	241,375
T10	(Australia) Jason Day	65-66-69-73=273	−7	160,875
T10	(United States) Tony Finau	68-66-71-68=273	−7	160,875
T10	(South Korea) Kim Si-woo	64-68-72-69=273	−7	160,875
T10	(England) Ian Poulter	62-67-70-74=273	−7	160,875

==== Scorecard ====
Final round

Hole	1	2	3	4	5	6	7	8	9	10	11	12	13	14	15	16	17	18
Par	4	5	4	4	3	4	3	4	4	4	4	3	4	4	3	5	4	4
(United States) Thomas	−14	−15	−15	−15	−15	−14	−14	−14	−14	−14	−14	−14	−15	−15	−15	−15	−15	−15
(United States) Stanley	−9	−8	−8	−8	−9	−9	−9	−10	−10	−11	−11	−12	−11	−10	−10	−11	−11	−11
(United States) Johnson	−5	−6	−7	−8	−8	−9	−9	−10	−10	−11	−11	−11	−11	−11	−11	−11	−11	−10
(Denmark) Olesen	−4	−5	−5	−4	−4	−4	−5	−5	−6	−6	−7	−7	−7	−8	−9	−9	−10	−10
(United States) Koepka	−6	−7	−7	−5	−5	−6	−6	−7	−7	−6	−7	−7	−8	−9	−8	−9	−9	−9

Cumulative tournament scores, relative to par

Birdie	Bogey	Double bogey
