= WGC Invitational =

Professional golf tournament

Tournament information
- Established: 1999
- Organized by: International Federation of PGA Tours
- Tours: PGA Tour; European Tour
- Format: Stroke play
- Prize fund: US$10,500,000 (final year)
- Month played: August
- Final year: 2021

Tournament record score
- Aggregate: 259 Tiger Woods (2000)
- To par: −21 as above

Final champion
- (Mexico) Abraham Ancer

The WGC Invitational was a professional golf tournament that was held in the United States. Established in 1999 as a successor to the World Series of Golf, it was one of three or four annual World Golf Championships (WGC) until 2021, when the number of WGC events was reduced to two.

Under sponsorship agreements, the WGC Invitational was titled as the WGC-NEC Invitational (1999–2005) and the WGC-Bridgestone Invitational (2006–2018). During this time, it was hosted at Firestone Country Club in Ohio, except for 2002 when it was hosted at Sahalee Country Club in Washington. With a change of sponsor in 2019, the tournament became titled as the WGC-FedEx St. Jude Invitational and was relocated to at TPC Southwind in Memphis, Tennessee.

The WGC Invitational was sanctioned and organized by the International Federation of PGA Tours and the prize money was official money on both the PGA Tour and the European Tour. Tiger Woods had the record number of wins with eight. The winner received a Wedgwood trophy called The Gary Player Cup.

== Sponsorship ==
From 1999 through 2005, the WGC Invitational was sponsored by NEC. NEC had also sponsored the World Series of Golf from 1984 to 1998. The tournament changed sponsorship in 2006, with Bridgestone taking over as title sponsor. As a part of the sponsorship agreement, the event continued to be held at the South Course of Firestone Country Club in Akron, Ohio. In August 2013, the Bridgestone sponsorship was extended through 2018.

The 2018 event was the last held in Akron. In 2019, FedEx became the title sponsor and relocated the tournament to Memphis, Tennessee.

== Venues ==
Prior to 2019 the event was hosted at the South Course of Firestone Country Club in Akron, Ohio, with one exception – the 2002 event, which was played at Sahalee Country Club in Sammamish, Washington. Between 2019 and 2021, the tournament was held at TPC Southwind in Memphis, Tennessee.

== Qualifying criteria ==
The event had a field of about 75 players, roughly half the number for a standard professional golf event. Invitations were issued to the following:

- Playing members of the last named Presidents Cup or Ryder Cup teams (whichever was played last).
- Players ranked among the top 50 on the Official World Golf Ranking (one week and two weeks prior to event).
- Tournament winners of worldwide events since the prior year's tournament with an Official World Golf Ranking Strength of Field Rating of 115 points or more.
- The winner of one selected tournament from each of the PGA Tour of Australasia, Sunshine Tour and Asian Tour and two selected tournaments from the Japan Golf Tour.

From 1999 to 2001, only the Ryder Cup and Presidents Cup teams were eligible and the field was about 40 players. Prior to 2011, both Ryder Cup and Presidents Cup teams were eligible.

== World Series of Golf ==
From 1976 through 1998, the PGA Tour event at Firestone Country Club was the "World Series of Golf," and was sponsored by NEC beginning in 1984. It was founded as a four-man invitational event in 1962, comprising the winners of the four major championships in a 36-hole event. the competitors played in one group for $75,000 in unofficial prize money, televised by NBC.

In 1976, it became a 72-hole, $300,000 PGA Tour event and its field was initially expanded to twenty; the victory and $100,000 winner's share went to Nicklaus. The largest first prize at a major in 1976 was $45,000 at the PGA Championship.

The World Series of Golf quickly became a leading event on the tour. For many years a victory in it gave a 10-year exemption on the PGA Tour, the same as was granted for a victory in a major championship at that time, and twice as long as is given even for winning a major now. The field consisted of the winners of all the high status men's professional golf tournaments around the world in the previous twelve months. This was quite different from the criteria for the WGC Invitational listed above, but produced much the same sort of global field.

== Winners ==
Year	Tour(s) (Note: EUR − European Tour; PGAT − PGA Tour.)	Winner	Score	To par	Margin of victory	Runner(s)-up	Purse ($)	Winner's share ($)	Venue
WGC-FedEx St. Jude Invitational
2021	EUR, PGAT	(Mexico) Abraham Ancer	264	−16	Playoff	(United States) Sam Burns (Japan) Hideki Matsuyama	10,500,000	1,820,000	Southwind, Tennessee
2020	EUR, PGAT	(United States) Justin Thomas (2)	267	−13	3 strokes	(United States) Daniel Berger (United States) Brooks Koepka (England) Tom Lewis (United States) Phil Mickelson	10,500,000	1,785,000	Southwind, Tennessee
2019	EUR, PGAT	(United States) Brooks Koepka	264	−16	3 strokes	(United States) Webb Simpson	10,250,000	1,745,000	Southwind, Tennessee
WGC-Bridgestone Invitational
2018	EUR, PGAT	(United States) Justin Thomas	265	−15	4 strokes	(United States) Kyle Stanley	10,000,000	1,700,000	Firestone, Ohio
2017	EUR, PGAT	(Japan) Hideki Matsuyama	264	−16	5 strokes	(United States) Zach Johnson	9,750,000	1,660,000	Firestone, Ohio
2016	PGAT (Note: The 2016 event was only sanctioned by the PGA Tour. It was not sanctioned by the European Tour due to a schedule change for the Olympic Games.)	(United States) Dustin Johnson	274	−6	1 stroke	(United States) Scott Piercy	9,500,000	1,620,000	Firestone, Ohio
2015	EUR, PGAT	(Republic of Ireland) Shane Lowry	269	−11	2 strokes	(United States) Bubba Watson	9,250,000	1,570,000	Firestone, Ohio
2014	EUR, PGAT	(Northern Ireland) Rory McIlroy	265	−15	2 strokes	(Spain) Sergio García	9,000,000	1,500,000	Firestone, Ohio
2013	EUR, PGAT	(United States) Tiger Woods (8)	265	−15	7 strokes	(United States) Keegan Bradley (Sweden) Henrik Stenson	8,750,000	1,500,000	Firestone, Ohio
2012	EUR, PGAT	(United States) Keegan Bradley	267	−13	1 stroke	(United States) Jim Furyk (United States) Steve Stricker	8,500,000	1,400,000	Firestone, Ohio
2011	EUR, PGAT	(Australia) Adam Scott	263	−17	4 strokes	(England) Luke Donald (United States) Rickie Fowler	8,500,000	1,400,000	Firestone, Ohio
2010	EUR, PGAT	(United States) Hunter Mahan	268	−12	2 strokes	(United States) Ryan Palmer	8,500,000	1,400,000	Firestone, Ohio
2009	EUR, PGAT	(United States) Tiger Woods (7)	268	−12	4 strokes	(Australia) Robert Allenby (Republic of Ireland) Pádraig Harrington	8,500,000	1,400,000	Firestone, Ohio
2008	EUR, PGAT	(Fiji) Vijay Singh	270	−10	1 stroke	(Australia) Stuart Appleby (England) Lee Westwood	8,000,000	1,350,000	Firestone, Ohio
2007	EUR, PGAT	(United States) Tiger Woods (6)	272	−8	8 strokes	(England) Justin Rose (South Africa) Rory Sabbatini	8,000,000	1,350,000	Firestone, Ohio
2006	EUR, PGAT	(United States) Tiger Woods (5)	270	−10	Playoff	(United States) Stewart Cink	7,500,000	1,300,000	Firestone, Ohio
WGC-NEC Invitational
2005	EUR, PGAT	(United States) Tiger Woods (4)	274	−6	1 stroke	(United States) Chris DiMarco	7,500,000	1,300,000	Firestone, Ohio
2004	EUR, PGAT	(United States) Stewart Cink	269	−11	4 strokes	(South Africa) Rory Sabbatini (United States) Tiger Woods	7,000,000	1,200,000	Firestone, Ohio
2003	EUR, PGAT	(Northern Ireland) Darren Clarke	268	−12	4 strokes	(United States) Jonathan Kaye	6,000,000	1,050,000	Firestone, Ohio
2002	EUR, PGAT	(Australia) Craig Parry	268	−16	4 strokes	(Australia) Robert Allenby (United States) Fred Funk	5,500,000	1,000,000	Sahalee, Washington
2001	EUR, PGAT	(United States) Tiger Woods (3)	268	−12	Playoff	(United States) Jim Furyk	5,000,000	1,000,000	Firestone, Ohio
2000	EUR, PGAT	(United States) Tiger Woods (2)	259	−21	11 strokes	(United States) Justin Leonard (Wales) Phillip Price	5,000,000	1,000,000	Firestone, Ohio
1999	EUR, PGAT	(United States) Tiger Woods	270	−10	1 stroke	(United States) Phil Mickelson	5,000,000	1,000,000	Firestone, Ohio
