= 2017–18 PGA Tour =

Golf tour season

2017–18 PGA Tour season
- Duration: October 5, 2017 – September 23, 2018
- Number of official events: 48
- Most wins: (United States) Bryson DeChambeau (3) (United States) Dustin Johnson (3) (United States) Justin Thomas (3) (United States) Bubba Watson (3)
- FedEx Cup: (England) Justin Rose
- Money list: (United States) Justin Thomas
- PGA Tour Player of the Year: (United States) Brooks Koepka
- PGA Player of the Year: (United States) Brooks Koepka
- Rookie of the Year: (United States) Aaron Wise

The 2017–18 PGA Tour was the 103rd season of the PGA Tour, the main professional golf tour in the United States. It was also the 50th season since separating from the PGA of America, and the 12th edition of the FedEx Cup.

== Changes for 2017–18 ==
The schedule contained 48 events, including two new tournaments; the CJ Cup in South Korea and the Corales Puntacana Resort and Club Championship, a former event on the Web.com Tour based in the Dominican Republic. The Barbasol Championship was played in Kentucky, the first non-major PGA Tour event in the state since 1959. The Puerto Rico Open became an unofficial charity event in the wake of Hurricane Maria.

== Schedule ==
The following table lists official events during the 2017–18 season.

Date	Tournament	Location	Purse (US$)	Winner(s) (Note: The number in parentheses after each winner's name is the number of PGA Tour events they had won up to and including that tournament. This information is only shown for PGA Tour members.)	OWGR points	Other tours (Note: ASA − Asian Tour.)	Notes
Oct 8	Safeway Open	California	6,200,000	(United States) Brendan Steele (3)	26		
Oct 15	CIMB Classic	Malaysia	7,000,000	(United States) Pat Perez (3)	48	ASA	Limited-field event
Oct 22	CJ Cup	South Korea	9,250,000	(United States) Justin Thomas (7)	50		New limited-field event
Oct 29	WGC-HSBC Champions	China	9,750,000	(England) Justin Rose (8)	64		World Golf Championship
Oct 29	Sanderson Farms Championship	Mississippi	4,300,000	(United States) Ryan Armour (1)	24		Alternate event
Nov 5	Shriners Hospitals for Children Open	Nevada	6,800,000	(United States) Patrick Cantlay (1)	30		
Nov 12	OHL Classic at Mayakoba	Mexico	7,100,000	(United States) Patton Kizzire (1)	32		
Nov 19	RSM Classic	Georgia	6,200,000	(United States) Austin Cook (1)	30		
Jan 7	Sentry Tournament of Champions	Hawaii	6,300,000	(United States) Dustin Johnson (17)	56		Winners-only event
Jan 14	Sony Open in Hawaii	Hawaii	6,200,000	(United States) Patton Kizzire (2)	48		
Jan 21	CareerBuilder Challenge	California	5,900,000	(Spain) Jon Rahm (2)	40		Pro-Am
Jan 29	Farmers Insurance Open	California	6,900,000	(Australia) Jason Day (11)	54		
Feb 4	Waste Management Phoenix Open	Arizona	6,900,000	(United States) Gary Woodland (3)	60		
Feb 11	AT&T Pebble Beach Pro-Am	California	7,400,000	(United States) Ted Potter Jr. (2)	54		Pro-Am
Feb 18	Genesis Open	California	7,200,000	(United States) Bubba Watson (10)	62		
Feb 25	The Honda Classic	Florida	6,600,000	(United States) Justin Thomas (8)	52		
Mar 4	WGC-Mexico Championship	Mexico	10,000,000	(United States) Phil Mickelson (43)	72		World Golf Championship
Mar 11	Valspar Championship	Florida	6,500,000	(England) Paul Casey (2)	52		
Mar 18	Arnold Palmer Invitational	Florida	8,900,000	(Northern Ireland) Rory McIlroy (14)	58		Invitational
Mar 25	WGC-Dell Technologies Match Play	Texas	10,000,000	(United States) Bubba Watson (11)	74		World Golf Championship
Mar 25	Corales Puntacana Resort and Club Championship	Dominican Republic	3,000,000	(United States) Brice Garnett (1)	24		New to PGA Tour; Alternate event
Apr 1	Houston Open	Texas	7,000,000	(England) Ian Poulter (3)	48		
Apr 8	Masters Tournament	Georgia	11,000,000	(United States) Patrick Reed (6)	100		Major championship
Apr 15	RBC Heritage	South Carolina	6,700,000	(Japan) Satoshi Kodaira (1)	52		Invitational
Apr 22	Valero Texas Open	Texas	6,200,000	(United States) Andrew Landry (1)	40		
Apr 29	Zurich Classic of New Orleans	Louisiana	7,200,000	(United States) Billy Horschel (5) and (United States) Scott Piercy (4)	n/a		Team event
May 6	Wells Fargo Championship	North Carolina	7,700,000	(Australia) Jason Day (12)	60		
May 13	The Players Championship	Florida	11,000,000	(United States) Webb Simpson (5)	80		Flagship event
May 20	AT&T Byron Nelson	Texas	7,700,000	(United States) Aaron Wise (1)	34		
May 27	Fort Worth Invitational	Texas	7,100,000	(England) Justin Rose (9)	56		Invitational
Jun 3	Memorial Tournament	Ohio	8,900,000	(United States) Bryson DeChambeau (2)	70		Invitational
Jun 10	FedEx St. Jude Classic	Tennessee	6,600,000	(United States) Dustin Johnson (18)	36		
Jun 17	U.S. Open	New York	12,000,000	(United States) Brooks Koepka (3)	100		Major championship
Jun 24	Travelers Championship	Connecticut	7,000,000	(United States) Bubba Watson (12)	58		
Jul 1	Quicken Loans National	Maryland	7,100,000	(Italy) Francesco Molinari (1)	34		Invitational
Jul 8	A Military Tribute at The Greenbrier	West Virginia	7,300,000	(United States) Kevin Na (2)	34		
Jul 15	John Deere Classic	Illinois	5,800,000	(United States) Michael Kim (1)	24		
Jul 22	The Open Championship	Scotland	10,500,000	(Italy) Francesco Molinari (2)	100		Major championship
Jul 23	Barbasol Championship	Kentucky	3,500,000	(United States) Troy Merritt (2)	24		Alternate event
Jul 29	RBC Canadian Open	Canada	6,200,000	(United States) Dustin Johnson (19)	46		
Aug 5	WGC-Bridgestone Invitational	Ohio	10,000,000	(United States) Justin Thomas (9)	74		World Golf Championship
Aug 5	Barracuda Championship	Nevada	3,400,000	(United States) Andrew Putnam (1)	24		Alternate event
Aug 12	PGA Championship	Missouri	11,000,000	(United States) Brooks Koepka (4)	100		Major championship
Aug 19	Wyndham Championship	North Carolina	6,000,000	(United States) Brandt Snedeker (9)	34		
Aug 26	The Northern Trust	New Jersey	9,000,000	(United States) Bryson DeChambeau (3)	76		FedEx Cup playoff event
Sep 3	Dell Technologies Championship	Massachusetts	9,000,000	(United States) Bryson DeChambeau (4)	76		FedEx Cup playoff event
Sep 10	BMW Championship	Pennsylvania	9,000,000	(United States) Keegan Bradley (4)	72		FedEx Cup playoff event
Sep 23	Tour Championship	Georgia	9,000,000	(United States) Tiger Woods (80)	62		FedEx Cup playoff event

=== Unofficial events ===
The following events were sanctioned by the PGA Tour, but did not carry FedEx Cup points or official money, nor were wins official.

Date	Tournament	Location	Purse ($)	Winner(s)	OWGR points	Notes
Dec 3	Hero World Challenge	Bahamas	3,500,000	(United States) Rickie Fowler	48	Limited-field event
Dec 10	QBE Shootout	Florida	3,300,000	(United States) Sean O'Hair and (United States) Steve Stricker	n/a	Team event
Jun 25	CVS Health Charity Classic	Rhode Island	1,500,000	(United States) Billy Andrade, (United States) Keegan Bradley and (Canada) Brooke Henderson	n/a	Team event
Sep 30	Ryder Cup	France	n/a	Team Europe	n/a	Team event

== Location of tournaments ==
Location of official tournaments of the 2017–18 PGA Tour in the continental United States and Canada.
600-point event (Players & Majors)
550-point event (World Golf Championships)
500-point event (Regular events)
Official team event
300-point event (Alternate events)
FedEx Cup playoff event
Location of official tournaments of the 2017–18 PGA Tour outside the continental United States and Canada.
600-point event (Players & Majors)
550-point event (World Golf Championships)
500-point event (Regular events)
300-point event (Alternate events)

== FedEx Cup ==
=== Final standings ===
For full rankings, see 2018 FedEx Cup Playoffs.

Final top 10 players in the FedEx Cup:

Position	Player	Points	Bonus money ($)
1	(England) Justin Rose	2,260	10,000,000
2	(United States) Tiger Woods	2,219	3,000,000
3	(United States) Bryson DeChambeau	2,188	2,000,000
4	(United States) Dustin Johnson	2,056	1,500,000
5	(United States) Billy Horschel	1,840	1,000,000
6	(United States) Tony Finau	1,732	800,000
7	(United States) Justin Thomas	1,610	700,000
8	(United States) Keegan Bradley	1,253	600,000
9	(United States) Brooks Koepka	1,093	550,000
10	(United States) Bubba Watson	918	500,000

== Money list ==
The money list was based on prize money won during the season, calculated in U.S. dollars.

Position	Player	Prize money ($)
1	(United States) Justin Thomas	8,694,821
2	(United States) Dustin Johnson	8,457,352
3	(England) Justin Rose	8,130,678
4	(United States) Bryson DeChambeau	8,094,489
5	(United States) Brooks Koepka	7,094,047
6	(United States) Bubba Watson	5,793,748
7	(United States) Tony Finau	5,620,138
8	(United States) Tiger Woods	5,443,841
9	(United States) Webb Simpson	5,376,417
10	(Australia) Jason Day	5,087,461

== Awards ==
Award	Winner	Ref.
PGA Tour Player of the Year (Jack Nicklaus Trophy)	(United States) Brooks Koepka	
PGA Player of the Year	(United States) Brooks Koepka	
Rookie of the Year	(United States) Aaron Wise	
Scoring leader (PGA Tour – Byron Nelson Award)	(United States) Dustin Johnson	
Scoring leader (PGA – Vardon Trophy)	(United States) Dustin Johnson	

== See also ==
- 2017 in golf
- 2018 in golf
- 2018 PGA Tour Champions season
- 2018 Web.com Tour
