= Kyle Stanley =

American professional golfer (born 1987)

Personal information
- Full name: Kyle Matthew Stanley
- Nationality: United States
- Born: November 19, 1987 (age 39) Gig Harbor, Washington, U.S.
- Height: 5 ft 11 in (1.80 m)
- Weight: 165 lb (75 kg; 11.8 st)

Career
- Sport: Golf
- College: Clemson University
- Turned professional: 2009
- Current tours: PGA Tour; Gira de Golf Profesional Mexicana
- Former tour: Korn Ferry Tour
- Professional wins: 2
- Highest ranking: 26 (August 5, 2018) (as of November 15, 2026)

Number of wins by tour
- PGA Tour: 2

Best results in major championships
- Masters Tournament: T21: 2019
- PGA Championship: CUT: 2012, 2013, 2017, 2018, 2019
- U.S. Open: 53rd: 2009
- The Open Championship: T39: 2012, 2018

Achievements and awards
- Ben Hogan Award: 2009

Kyle Matthew Stanley (born November 19, 1987) is an American professional golfer who plays on the PGA Tour.

== Amateur career ==
Stanley was born in Gig Harbor, Washington. He was a 2002 graduate of St. Charles Borromeo elementary and middle school and a 2006 graduate of Bellarmine Preparatory School (both Catholic schools located in Tacoma, Washington).

As a freshman at Clemson University, he established 18 individual scoring records. During his college career he has won the 2006 Aloha Purdue Collegiate and the 2008 Carpet Classic. He was named the ACC player of the year for the 2006-07 season. Stanley was named first-team All-America in 2007 and 2009 by the Golf Coaches Association of America. He was the Individual runner-up at the NCAA Championship in 2007 and 2009. He was a member of the 2007 American Walker Cup team. Stanley studied Sports Management while at Clemson. In 2009 he was given the Ben Hogan Award for best college golfer.

== Professional career ==
Stanley turned professional after the 2009 U.S. Open and made his pro debut a week later at the Travelers Championship. Late in 2010, Stanley earned a 2011 PGA Tour card through Q-School where he finished in a tie for ninth. In his debut season on tour, he recorded four top-10 finishes, with the best of these coming at the John Deere Classic where he finished runner-up to Steve Stricker by a single stroke. The runner-up finish did however help Stanley secure the final available spot at the 2011 Open Championship. It was his first ever appearance in an Open Championship and he made the cut to finish in a tie for 44th. He also made the third FedEx Cup playoff event, the BMW Championship, finishing tied for 10th, though that wasn't good enough to provide entrance to the final event of the year, The Tour Championship. He finished the 2011 season 55th on the PGA Tour money list and 148th on the Official World Golf Ranking.

=== 2012: Torrey Pines collapse and Scottsdale comeback ===
In January 2012, Stanley looking for his maiden win on the PGA Tour, surrendered a six-shot lead during the final round of the Farmers Insurance Open. He started the day with a six stroke advantage over the rest of the field and at one stage during the final round extended this to seven strokes. As he approached the final hole, Stanley led by three strokes over Brandt Snedeker with just the par-five 18th to play. However, after laying up with his second shot, he spun his approach off the green and into the water hazard. After taking a penalty drop, he found the back edge of the green and three putted to record a triple-bogey eight on the final hole of regulation to result in a sudden-death playoff with Snedeker. After replaying the 18th and both making birdie, Snedeker won the tournament on the second playoff hole with a par after Stanley once again three putted the green.

The following week, Stanley came back from eight shots behind 54 hole leader Spencer Levin at the Waste Management Phoenix Open in Scottsdale for his first PGA Tour win. Stanley shot a final round bogey-free 65 for a one stroke victory over Ben Crane. The eight shot comeback win was also tied for third in the largest final round comeback by a winner in PGA Tour history.

Stanley briefly moved into the top 50 of the Official World Golf Ranking by virtue of his quarter-finalist finish at the WGC-Accenture Match Play Championship, peaking at 47.

=== 2013–16 ===
Stanley had two third-places in 2013 which allowed him to finish 62nd on the PGA Tour's money list. In 2014 Stanley only had one top-ten and finished 148th on the PGA Tour's money list, and thereby lost his full-time PGA Tour status. In 2015 Stanley split his time on both the PGA Tour and the Web.com Tour. He played well in the year-end Web.com Tour Final series to earn his PGA Tour card again for the 2015–16 season.

Stanley used the last tournament of the 2015–16 regular season, the Wyndham Championship, to move into the top 125 and qualify for the FedEx Cup playoffs, however, after a tie for 74th at The Barclays, he was only 116th on the points list, 16 spots short of qualifying for the second round of the playoffs.

=== 2017 ===
Throughout most of the 2016–17 season, Stanley was one of the best players on Tour in strokes gained tee-to-green, but his short-game and putting statistics were outside the top 100. Stanley had several strong performances during the season, including top-10 results in Las Vegas, Houston, Ponte Vedra Beach, and Dublin, Ohio (Columbus).

On July 2, Stanley defeated Charles Howell III on the first hole of a sudden-death playoff at the Quicken Loans National at the TPC Potomac at Avenel Farm. After Howell made bogey, Stanley made a 4-foot uphill par putt to secure his first championship in five years. His win in Maryland ensured his qualification for the Open Championship. It was Stanley's first appearance in a major since 2013. The win also qualified him for the PGA Championship and the 2018 Masters Tournament.

== Amateur wins ==
- 2004 Boys Junior Americas Cup, Hargray Junior Invitational
- 2005 HP Boys Championship, MCI Junior Heritage
- 2006 Sahalee Players Championship, Southern Amateur
- 2008 Southern Amateur
- 2009 Jones Cup Invitational

== Professional wins (2) ==
=== PGA Tour wins (2) ===
| No. | Date | Tournament | Winning score | Margin of victory | Runner-up |
|---|---|---|---|---|---|
| 1 | Feb 5, 2012 | Waste Management Phoenix Open | −15 (69-66-69-65=269) | 1 stroke | (United States) Ben Crane |
| 2 | Jul 2, 2017 | Quicken Loans National | −7 (70-70-67-66=273) | Playoff | (United States) Charles Howell III |

PGA Tour playoff record (1–2)

| No. | Year | Tournament | Opponent(s) | Result |
|---|---|---|---|---|
| 1 | 2012 | Farmers Insurance Open | (United States) Brandt Snedeker | Lost to par on second extra hole |
| 2 | 2017 | Quicken Loans National | (United States) Charles Howell III | Won with par on first extra hole |
| 3 | 2018 | Memorial Tournament | (South Korea) An Byeong-hun, (United States) Bryson DeChambeau | DeChambeau won with birdie on second extra hole Stanley eliminated by par on first hole |

== Results in major championships ==
| Tournament | 2008 | 2009 | 2010 | 2011 | 2012 | 2013 | 2014 | 2015 | 2016 | 2017 | 2018 |
|---|---|---|---|---|---|---|---|---|---|---|---|
| Masters Tournament | | | | | CUT | | | | | | 52 |
| U.S. Open | CUT | 53 | | | CUT | 73 | | | | | CUT |
| The Open Championship | | | | T44 | T39 | CUT | | | | CUT | T39 |
| PGA Championship | | | | | CUT | CUT | | | | CUT | CUT |

| Tournament | 2019 |
|---|---|
| Masters Tournament | T21 |
| PGA Championship | CUT |
| U.S. Open | T65 |
| The Open Championship | T41 |

Did not play

CUT = missed the half-way cut
"T" = tied

=== Summary ===
| Tournament | Wins | 2nd | 3rd | Top-5 | Top-10 | Top-25 | Events | Cuts made |
|---|---|---|---|---|---|---|---|---|
| Masters Tournament | 0 | 0 | 0 | 0 | 0 | 1 | 3 | 2 |
| PGA Championship | 0 | 0 | 0 | 0 | 0 | 0 | 5 | 0 |
| U.S. Open | 0 | 0 | 0 | 0 | 0 | 0 | 6 | 3 |
| The Open Championship | 0 | 0 | 0 | 0 | 0 | 0 | 6 | 4 |
| Totals | 0 | 0 | 0 | 0 | 0 | 1 | 20 | 9 |

- Most consecutive cuts made – 2 (twice, current)
- Longest streak of top-10s – 0

== Results in The Players Championship ==
| Tournament | 2012 | 2013 | 2014 | 2015 | 2016 | 2017 | 2018 | 2019 | 2020 | 2021 | 2022 |
|---|---|---|---|---|---|---|---|---|---|---|---|
| The Players Championship | CUT | T33 | 71 | | | T4 | CUT | CUT | C | CUT | CUT |

Top 10
Did not play

CUT = missed the halfway cut
"T" indicates a tie for a place
C = Canceled after the first round due to the COVID-19 pandemic

== Results in World Golf Championships ==
Results not in chronological order before 2015.

| Tournament | 2012 | 2013 | 2014 | 2015 | 2016 | 2017 | 2018 | 2019 |
|---|---|---|---|---|---|---|---|---|
| Championship | T51 | | | | | | T25 | T58 |
| Match Play | R32 | | | | | | QF | T24 |
| Invitational | T16 | | | | | T41 | 2 | |
| Champions | T65 | | | | | T5 | T22 | |

Top 10
Did not play

QF, R16, R32, R64 = Round in which player lost in match play
"T" = tied

== U.S. national team appearances ==
Amateur

- Walker Cup: 2007 (winners)

Professional

- World Cup: 2018

== See also ==
- 2010 PGA Tour Qualifying School graduates
- 2015 Web.com Tour Finals graduates
