= LIV Golf Bedminster =

Professional golf tournament

LIV Golf New York
Tournament information
- Location: Bedminster, New Jersey
- Established: 2022
- Course: Trump National Golf Club Bedminster
- Par: 72
- Length: 7,580 yards (6,930 m)
- Tours: LIV Golf League; MENA Tour
- Format: Individual stroke play and team event
- Prize fund: US$20,000,000 (individual); US$5,000,000 (team)
- Month played: July

Tournament record score
- Aggregate: 268 Joaquín Niemann (2026)
- To par: −16 as above

Current champion
- (Chile) Joaquín Niemann

Location map
- Location in the United States Location in New Jersey

The LIV Golf New York is a professional golf tournament that was held in Bedminster, New Jersey, outside of New York City. The tournament was held in July 2022, at Trump National Golf Club Bedminster and was the third event for LIV Golf, a new golf series led by Greg Norman and funded by the Saudi Arabian Public Investment Fund.

== Format ==
The tournament was a 54-hole individual stroke play event, with a team element. Four man teams were selected via a draft by their designated team captains, with a set number of their total scores counting for the team on each day. Each round commenced with a shotgun start, with the leaders beginning on the first hole for the final round, in order to finish on the eighteenth.

== Inaugural field ==
The field for the inaugural event was announced on July 19. 45 of the 48 players were named, with the remaining three to be confirmed. The following day they were confirmed as Henrik Stenson (who had been relieved from his position as captain of the European Ryder Cup team earlier in the day), Jason Kokrak and Charles Howell III. (Note: (a) – Amateur)

- Abraham Ancer
- Richard Bland
- Laurie Canter
- Paul Casey (Note: Casey, Stenson, Kokrak and Howell III made their first appearances in the series.)
- Eugenio Chacarra
- Bryson DeChambeau (c)
- Hennie du Plessis
- Sergio García (c)
- Talor Gooch
- Branden Grace
- Justin Harding
- Sam Horsfield
- Charles Howell III
- Yuki Inamori
- Dustin Johnson (c)
- Matt Jones
- Sadom Kaewkanjana
- Martin Kaymer (c)
- Phachara Khongwatmai
- Ryosuke Kinoshita
- Brooks Koepka (c)
- Chase Koepka
- Jason Kokrak
- Jinichiro Kozuma
- Graeme McDowell
- Phil Mickelson (c)
- Jediah Morgan
- Kevin Na (c)
- Shaun Norris
- Louis Oosthuizen (c)
- Wade Ormsby (c)
- Carlos Ortiz
- Pat Perez
- Turk Pettit
- James Piot
- Ian Poulter
- David Puig (a)
- Patrick Reed
- Charl Schwartzel
- Travis Smyth
- Henrik Stenson
- Hudson Swafford (c)
- Hideto Tanihara (c)
- Peter Uihlein
- Scott Vincent
- Lee Westwood (c)
- Bernd Wiesberger
- Matthew Wolff

=== Teams ===
- 4 Aces GC: Johnson (c), Reed, Gooch, Perez
- Cleeks GC: Kaymer (c), McDowell, Canter, Puig (a)
- Crusher GC: DeChambeau (c), Casey, Howell III, Norris
- Fireball GC: García (c), Ancer, Ortiz, Chacarra
- HY Flyers GC: Mickelson (c), Wiesberger, Wolff, Harding
- Iron Heads GC: Na (c), Kaewkanjana, Khongwatmai, Vincent
- Majesticks GC: Westwood (c), Poulter, Stenson, Horsfield
- Niblicks GC: Swafford (c), Uihlein, Piot, Pettit
- Punch GC: Ormsby (c), Jones, Smyth, Morgan
- Smash GC: B. Koepka (c), Kokrak, Bland, C. Koepka
- Stinger GC: Oosthuizen (c), Schwartzel, Grace, Du Plessis
- Torque GC: Tanihara (c), Kinoshita, Inamori, Kozuma

== Winners ==
=== Individual ===
Year	Tour(s) (Note: LIV − LIV Golf League; MENA − MENA Tour.)	Winner	Score	To par	Margin of victory	Runner(s)-up
LIV Golf New York
2026	LIV	(Chile) Joaquín Niemann	268	−16	3 strokes	(United States) Harold Varner III
2024–2025: No tournament
LIV Golf Bedminster
2023	LIV, MENA	(Australia) Cameron Smith	201	−12	7 strokes	(India) Anirban Lahiri
LIV Golf Invitational Bedminster
2022	LIV	(Sweden) Henrik Stenson	202	−11	2 strokes	(United States) Dustin Johnson (United States) Matthew Wolff

=== Team ===
Year	Winners (Note: (c) – Team captain)	Score (to par)	Margin of victory	Runners-up
LIV Golf New York
2026				
LIV Golf Bedminster
2023	Ripper GC (Note: Matt Jones, Marc Leishman, Jediah Morgan and Cameron Smith (c))	−20	11 strokes	Crushers GC (Note: Paul Casey, Bryson DeChambeau (c), Charles Howell III and Anirban Lahiri); Stinger GC (Note: Dean Burmester, Branden Grace, Louis Oosthuizen (c) and Charl Schwartzel)
LIV Golf Invitational Bedminster
2022	4Aces GC (Note: Talor Gooch, Dustin Johnson (c), Pat Perez and Patrick Reed)	−25	8 strokes	Majesticks GC (Note: Sam Horsfield, Ian Poulter, Henrik Stenson and Lee Westwood (c))
