= 2024 LIV Golf League =

Golf tour season

2024 LIV Golf League season
- Duration: 2 February 2024 – 22 September 2024
- Number of official events: 14
- Most wins: (United States) Brooks Koepka (2) (Chile) Joaquín Niemann (2) (Spain) Jon Rahm (2)
- Individual points list: (Spain) Jon Rahm
- Team champions: Ripper GC
- Money list: (Spain) Jon Rahm

The 2024 LIV Golf League was the third season of LIV Golf following the inaugural LIV Golf Invitational Series. The season consisted of thirteen 54-hole tournaments, featuring 48 players and no cut, with a team championship event at the season end.

== Qualification ==
Players who did not play in the 2023 LIV Golf League will have two opportunities to qualify for the 2024 LIV Golf League. The first is by winning the 2023 Asian Tour International Series Order of Merit. This spot was won by Andy Ogletree.

The other three spots will be claimed by the top three finishers in the 2023 LIV Golf Promotions event which will be held 8–10 December 2023 at Abu Dhabi Golf Club. The event will take place over three days, with 72 holes being played in total. The first round will be open players finishing 6–32 in the 2023 International Series Order of Merit, winners of leading amateur tournaments, players ranked inside the top-200 of the Official World Golf Ranking and players ranked inside the top-20 of the World Amateur Golf Ranking. The top-20 and ties from the first round advance to the second round, where scores are reset. Also entering at this stage will be players relegated from the 2023 LIV Golf League, tournament winners during the 2022–23 PGA Tour and 2023 European Tour seasons, major champions since 2018, Ryder Cup and Presidents Cup players, and players finishing 2–5 on the 2023 International Series Order of Merit. The top-16 from the second round will advance to the final two rounds, with the scores being reset once again. The top three finishers over the final two rounds will earn status to play in the 2024 LIV Golf League.

On 30 November 2023, LIV Golf released the field for the promotions event. The field included more than 70 players from 23 different countries. Notable entries included 2013 PGA Championship winner Jason Dufner and two-time PGA Tour winner Kyle Stanley. Also in the field were three players who were relegated from LIV Golf after the 2023 season: Sihwan Kim, Jediah Morgan, and James Piot. Laurie Canter, Kieran Vincent, and Wade Ormsby, who played in various events of the 2023 season as reserve players, were also in the field. The three spots were won by Kalle Samooja, Jinichiro Kozuma, and Kieran Vincent.

== Broadcasting ==
In the United States, LIV Golf will be in the second year of a multi-year deal with The CW to broadcast and stream its tournaments.

== PGA Tour agreement ==
In June 2023, it was announced that the Public Investment Fund, the PGA Tour and the European Tour would create a new entity to serve the best interests of each entity. As of 15 November 2023, terms of that agreement have not been finalized, and LIV Golf is moving forward with its plans for the 2024 LIV Golf League.

== Player movements ==
From the end of the 2023 season until the beginning of the 2024 season saw numerous changes to team rosters.

=== Lock Zone contract extensions ===
Players who finished in the top 24, also called the Lock Zone, of the 2023 individual standings whose contracts expired after the season will be offered extensions for a minimum of one year to remain with their current teams. Players can choose to accept the contract extension or become free agents.

The following table lists players who finished in the Lock Zone and were offered contracts by their teams for 2024 and whether they accepted the contract extension or became a free agent.

Player	2023 Team	2023 Finish	Decision
(United States) Peter Uihlein	4Aces GC	12th	Signed
(India) Anirban Lahiri	Crushers GC	13th	Signed
(Mexico) Carlos Ortiz	Fireballs GC	15th	Free agent
(England) Richard Bland	Cleeks GC	20th	Signed
(Zimbabwe) Scott Vincent	Iron Heads GC	22nd	Signed

=== Free agents ===
Players who declined their contract extensions, along with those who finished in places 25–44 of the individual standings, also called the Open Zone, whose contracts expired after the season will become free agents and can negotiate with any team. Free agents are not guaranteed to be signed and may lose their playing privileges in 2024 if they are not signed. The free agency period began on 16 November 2023. The following table lists players who became free agents.

Player	2023 Team	2023 Finish	2024 Team	Ref.
(Mexico) Carlos Ortiz	Fireballs GC	15th	Torque GC	
(United States) Pat Perez	4Aces GC	28th	4Aces GC	
(Spain) David Puig	Torque GC	31st	Fireballs GC	
(Australia) Matt Jones	Ripper GC	37th	Ripper GC	
(Austria) Bernd Wiesberger	Cleeks GC	41st	Unsigned	
(Northern Ireland) Graeme McDowell	Cleeks GC	42nd	Smash GC	

=== Relegated players ===
Players who finished in places 45 and below and are not team captains are relegated out of LIV Golf and may not be signed by another team unless they earn their way back into the 2024 season through the LIV Golf Promotions event. The following table lists players who were relegated after the 2023 season.

Player	2023 Team	2023 Finish	2024 Status
(Australia) Jediah Morgan	Ripper GC	46th	None (Note: Morgan was eliminated after the final day of LIV Golf Promotions, leaving him ineligible for the 2024 LIV Golf League.)
(United States) James Piot	HyFlyers GC	47th	None (Note: Sihwan Kim and James Piot were eliminated after day 2 of LIV Golf Promotions, leaving them ineligible for the 2024 LIV Golf League.)
(United States) Chase Koepka	Smash GC	48th	None (Note: Chase Koepka originally entered into the LIV Golf Promotions event, but withdrew, leaving him ineligible for the 2024 LIV Golf League.)
(United States) Sihwan Kim	Iron Heads GC	50th	None

=== Promoted players ===
Player	2023 Tour(s)	Qualification method	2024 Team	Ref.
(United States) Andy Ogletree	Asian Tour (Note: Also played as a reserve during the 2023 LIV Golf League.)	International Series Order of Merit	HyFlyers GC	
(Finland) Kalle Samooja	DP World Tour	LIV Golf Promotions	Cleeks GC	
(Japan) Jinichiro Kozuma	Japan Golf Tour, Asian Tour	LIV Golf Promotions	Iron Heads GC	
(Zimbabwe) Kieran Vincent	Asian Tour	LIV Golf Promotions	Legion XIII	

=== Newly signed players ===
In addition to qualifying for the 2024 season through the International Series or via the LIV Golf Promotions event, players who have not played for LIV Golf can join the 2024 season by signing with the league or with a team.

Player	2023 Tour(s)	2024 Team	Ref.
(Spain) Jon Rahm	PGA Tour, DP World Tour	Legion XIII	
(Australia) Lucas Herbert	PGA Tour, DP World Tour	Ripper GC	
(Poland) Adrian Meronk	DP World Tour	Cleeks GC	
(England) Tyrrell Hatton	PGA Tour, DP World Tour	Legion XIII	
(United States) Caleb Surratt	None (amateur)	Legion XIII	

=== Trades ===
The following trades took place during the offseason before the 2024 season started:

- 7 December 2023: RangeGoats GC sent 2023 individual champion Talor Gooch to Smash GC in exchange for Matthew Wolff.
- 7 December 2023: RangeGoats GC sent Harold Varner III to 4Aces GC in exchange for Peter Uihlein.

=== Departures ===
The following players (full-time only) are no longer with LIV Golf after the conclusion of the 2023 season:

- Bernd Wiesberger returned to the DP World Tour full-time for the 2024 season, after his contract was not renewed.
- Chase Koepka was ineligible for the 2024 LIV Golf League after withdrawing from the 2023 LIV Golf Promotions event.
- Sihwan Kim and James Piot were eliminated after Day 2 of the LIV Golf Promotions event, making them ineligible for the 2024 LIV Golf League.
- Jediah Morgan was eliminated after the final day of the LIV Golf Promotions event, making him ineligible for the 2024 LIV Golf League.

== Rosters ==
Team	Members (Note: Players presented in order of the LIV Golf beginning of free agency announcement.)				
Team	Captain(s)	Player 2	Player 3	Player 4	Substitute players
4Aces GC	(United States) Dustin Johnson	(United States) Patrick Reed	(United States) Harold Varner III	(United States) Pat Perez	
Cleeks GC	(Germany) Martin Kaymer	(England) Richard Bland	(Finland) Kalle Samooja	(Poland) Adrian Meronk	
Crushers GC	(United States) Bryson DeChambeau	(England) Paul Casey	(United States) Charles Howell III	(India) Anirban Lahiri	(United States) John Catlin (Note: Substituted for Howell in Houston, Nashville, Andalucía, and the UK.)
Fireballs GC	(Spain) Sergio García	(Mexico) Abraham Ancer	(Spain) Eugenio Chacarra	(Spain) David Puig	
HyFlyers GC	(United States) Phil Mickelson	(United States) Cameron Tringale	(United States) Brendan Steele	(United States) Andy Ogletree	
Iron Heads GC	(United States) Kevin Na	(New Zealand) Danny Lee	(Zimbabwe) Scott Vincent	(Japan) Jinichiro Kozuma	
Legion XIII	(Spain) Jon Rahm	(England) Tyrrell Hatton	(United States) Caleb Surratt	(Zimbabwe) Kieran Vincent	(New Zealand) Ben Campbell (Note: Substituted for Rahm after he withdrew during the second round in Houston.) (United States) John Catlin (Note: Substituted for Rahm after he withdrew before the second round in Dallas.)
Majesticks GC (Note: Stenson, Poulter, and Westwood are co-captains of Majesticks GC.)	(England) Ian Poulter, (England) Lee Westwood, (Sweden) Henrik Stenson			(England) Sam Horsfield	(New Zealand) Ben Campbell (Note: Substituted for Horsfield at The Greenbrier.)
RangeGoats GC	(United States) Bubba Watson	(United States) Matthew Wolff	(United States) Peter Uihlein	(Belgium) Thomas Pieters	(Australia) Wade Ormsby (Note: Substituted for Wolff after he withdrew before the third round in Jeddah.)
Ripper GC	(Australia) Cameron Smith	(Australia) Marc Leishman	(Australia) Matt Jones	(Australia) Lucas Herbert	(New Zealand) Ben Campbell (Note: Substituted for Smith after he withdrew before the second round with an illness in Miami.) (Australia) Wade Ormsby (Note: Substituted for Leishman after he withdrew before the second round in the UK.)
Smash GC	(United States) Brooks Koepka	(United States) Jason Kokrak	(United States) Talor Gooch	(Northern Ireland) Graeme McDowell	(United States) John Catlin (Note: Substituted for McDowell at The Greenbrier.)
Stinger GC	(South Africa) Louis Oosthuizen	(South Africa) Branden Grace	(South Africa) Charl Schwartzel	(South Africa) Dean Burmester	(Australia) Wade Ormsby (Note: Substituted for Oosthuizen after he withdrew before the second round in Houston.)
Torque GC	(Chile) Joaquín Niemann	(Chile) Mito Pereira	(Colombia) Sebastián Muñoz	(Mexico) Carlos Ortiz	

=== Wild cards ===
New for the 2024 season were wild card players, who will compete in the individual competition without being a member of a team. On 31 January 2024, LIV Golf announced the first two wild cards who will play during the 2024 season, the first being Hudson Swafford; who will play for the entire season as a wildcard. The second wild card was Laurie Canter, who was signed to play in the first two events of the season. In late February, Anthony Kim was announced as the second wild card player for the remainder of the season; Kim had last played professionally in 2012, when he retired due to injuries.

=== Reserve players ===
In 2024, LIV Golf maintained a roster of reserve players who were available to fill in on any team when there were injuries or other absences from tournaments. The reserve players announced for 2024 were Ben Campbell, Laurie Canter, Luis Carrera, John Catlin and Wade Ormsby.

== Schedule ==
The following table lists official events during the 2024 season.

Date	Tournament	Host country	Purse (US$)		Individual winner (Note: The number in brackets after each winner's name is the number of LIV Golf League events they had won up to and including that tournament.)	Winning team	Notes
Date	Tournament	Host country	Individual	Team	Individual winner	Winning team	Notes
4 Feb	LIV Golf Mayakoba	Mexico	20,000,000	5,000,000	(Chile) Joaquín Niemann (1)	Legion XIII	
10 Feb	LIV Golf Las Vegas	United States	20,000,000	5,000,000	(United States) Dustin Johnson (3)	Smash GC	New tournament
3 Mar	LIV Golf Jeddah	Saudi Arabia	20,000,000	5,000,000	(Chile) Joaquín Niemann (2)	Crushers GC	
10 Mar	LIV Golf Hong Kong	Hong Kong	20,000,000	5,000,000	(Mexico) Abraham Ancer (1)	Crushers GC	New tournament
7 Apr	LIV Golf Miami	United States	20,000,000	5,000,000	(South Africa) Dean Burmester (1)	Legion XIII	
28 Apr	LIV Golf Adelaide	Australia	20,000,000	5,000,000	(United States) Brendan Steele (1)	Ripper GC	
5 May	LIV Golf Singapore	Singapore	20,000,000	5,000,000	(United States) Brooks Koepka (4)	Ripper GC	
9 Jun	LIV Golf Houston	United States	20,000,000	5,000,000	(Mexico) Carlos Ortiz (1)	Cleeks GC	New tournament
23 Jun	LIV Golf Nashville	United States	20,000,000	5,000,000	(England) Tyrrell Hatton (1)	Legion XIII	New tournament
14 Jul	LIV Golf Andalucía	Spain	20,000,000	5,000,000	(Spain) Sergio García (1)	Fireballs GC	
28 Jul	LIV Golf UK	England	20,000,000	5,000,000	(Spain) Jon Rahm (1)	Legion XIII	
18 Aug	LIV Golf Greenbrier	United States	20,000,000	5,000,000	(United States) Brooks Koepka (5)	Smash GC	
15 Sep	LIV Golf Chicago	United States	20,000,000	5,000,000	(Spain) Jon Rahm (2)	Crushers GC	
22 Sep	LIV Golf Team Championship Dallas	United States	n/a	50,000,000	n/a	Ripper GC	Team Championship

== Points list ==
=== Individual points list ===
The individual points list was based on tournament results during the season, calculated using a points-based system.

Position	Player	Team	Points
1	(Spain) Jon Rahm	Legion XIII	235.17
2	(Chile) Joaquín Niemann	Torque GC	219.20
3	(Spain) Sergio García	Fireballs GC	162.49
4	(England) Tyrrell Hatton	Legion XIII	161.49
5	(United States) Brooks Koepka	Smash GC	138.73

=== Team points list ===
The team points list was based on tournament results during the season, calculated using a points-based system.

Position	Team	Points	TC finish
1	Crushers GC	209	T7
2	Legion XIII	200	4th
3	Ripper GC	151	1st
4	Smash GC	133	13th
5	Torque GC	129	10th

== Money list ==
The money list was based on prize money won during the season, calculated in U.S. dollars.

Position	Player	Prize money ($)		
Position	Player	Individual	Bonus	Total
1	(Spain) Jon Rahm	16,737,904	18,000,000	34,737,904
2	(Chile) Joaquín Niemann	16,381,666	8,000,000	24,381,666
3	(Spain) Sergio García	13,087,143	4,000,000	17,087,143
4	(England) Tyrrell Hatton	11,630,595		11,630,595
5	(United States) Brooks Koepka	11,573,958		11,573,958
