= LIV Golf Chicago =

Professional golf tournament

Tournament information
- Location: Bolingbrook, Illinois
- Established: 2022
- Course: Bolingbrook Golf Club
- Par: 71
- Length: 7,408 yards (6,774 m)
- Tours: LIV Golf; MENA Tour
- Format: Individual and team stroke play
- Prize fund: US$5,000,000 (individual); US$20,000,000 (team)
- Month played: September

Tournament record score
- Aggregate: 199 Jon Rahm (2024)
- To par: −13 Cameron Smith (2022) −13 Bryson DeChambeau (2023)

Current champion
- (South Africa) Dean Burmester

Location map
- Location in the United States Location in Illinois

The LIV Golf Chicago is a professional golf tournament held at Bolingbrook Golf Club in Bolingbrook, Illinois, outside of Chicago. It was held at Rich Harvest Farms in 2022 and 2023.

The inaugural event was held in September 2022 at Rich Harvest Farms as part of the LIV Golf Invitational Series, a golf series led by Greg Norman and funded by the Saudi Arabian Public Investment Fund. The 48-player field featured several former major championship including Phil Mickelson, Dustin Johnson, Brooks Koepka, Bryson DeChambeau, Charl Schwartzel, Patrick Reed and Sergio García, and was won by 2022 Open champion Cameron Smith.

== Format ==
The tournament was a 54-hole individual stroke play event, with a team element. Four-man teams were announced on the Monday before the tournament, with a set number of their total scores counting for the team on each day. Each round commenced with a shotgun start, with the leaders beginning on the first hole for the final round, in order to finish on the eighteenth.

== Inaugural field ==
48 golfers participated in the inaugural LIV Chicago event. (Note: (c) – Team captain)

- Abraham Ancer
- Richard Bland
- Laurie Canter
- Paul Casey
- Eugenio Chacarra
- Bryson DeChambeau (c)
- Sergio García (c)
- Talor Gooch
- Branden Grace
- Sam Horsfield
- Charles Howell III
- Dustin Johnson (c)
- Matt Jones
- Sadom Kaewkanjana
- Martin Kaymer (c)
- Phachara Khongwatmai
- Sihwan Kim
- Brooks Koepka (c)
- Chase Koepka
- Jason Kokrak
- Anirban Lahiri
- Marc Leishman
- Graeme McDowell
- Phil Mickelson (c)
- Jediah Morgan
- Kevin Na (c)
- Joaquín Niemann
- Shaun Norris
- Louis Oosthuizen (c)
- Wade Ormsby (c)
- Carlos Ortiz
- Pat Perez
- Turk Pettit
- James Piot
- David Puig
- Ian Poulter
- Patrick Reed
- Charl Schwartzel
- Cameron Smith
- Henrik Stenson
- Hudson Swafford (c)
- Cameron Tringale
- Peter Uihlein
- Harold Varner III
- Scott Vincent
- Lee Westwood
- Bernd Wiesberger
- Matthew Wolff

=== Teams ===
- 4 Aces GC: Johnson (c), Gooch, Perez, Reed
- Cleeks GC: Kaymer (c), McDowell, Canter, Bland
- Crusher GC: DeChambeau (c), Casey, Howell III, Lahiri
- Fireball GC: García (c), Ancer, Ortiz, Chacarra
- HY Flyers GC: Mickelson (c), Wiesberger, Wolff, Tringale
- Iron Heads GC: Na (c), Kaewkanjana, Khongwatmai, Kim
- Majesticks GC: Westwood (c), Stenson, Poulter, Horsfield
- Niblicks GC: Swafford, Piot, Pettit, Varner III
- Punch GC: Ormsby, Jones, Leishman, Smith
- Smash GC: B. Koepka (c), C. Koepka, Kokrak, Uihlein
- Stinger GC: Oosthuizen (c), Schwartzel, Grace, Norris
- Torque GC: Niemann, Vincent, Puig, Morgan

== Winners ==
=== Individual ===
Year	Tour(s) (Note: LIV − LIV Golf League; MENA − MENA Tour.)	Winner	Score	To par	Margin of victory	Runners-up
LIV Golf Chicago
2025	LIV	(South Africa) Dean Burmester	204	−9	Playoff	(Spain) Joséle Ballester (Spain) Jon Rahm
2024	LIV	(Spain) Jon Rahm	199	−11	3 strokes	(Spain) Sergio García (Chile) Joaquín Niemann
2023	LIV, MENA	(United States) Bryson DeChambeau	200	−13	1 stroke	(India) Anirban Lahiri (Australia) Marc Leishman
LIV Golf Invitational Chicago
2022	LIV	(Australia) Cameron Smith	203	−13	3 strokes	(United States) Dustin Johnson (United States) Peter Uihlein

=== Team ===
Year	Winners	Score (to par)	Margin of victory	Runners-up
LIV Golf Chicago
2025	Stinger GC (Note: Dean Burmester, Branden Grace, Louis Oosthuizen (c) and Charl Schwartzel)	−17	Playoff	Torque GC (Note: Joaquín Niemann (c), Sebastián Muñoz, Carlos Ortiz and Mito Pereira)
2024	Crushers GC (Note: Paul Casey, Bryson DeChambeau (c), Charles Howell III and Anirban Lahiri)	−14	1 stroke	Legion XIII (Note: Tyrrell Hatton, Jon Rahm (c), Caleb Surratt and Kieran Vincent)
2023	Crushers GC	−33	3 strokes	Fireballs GC (Note: Abraham Ancer, Eugenio Chacarra, Sergio García (c) and Carlos Ortiz)
LIV Golf Invitational Chicago
2022	4Aces GC (Note: Talor Gooch, Dustin Johnson (c), Pat Perez and Patrick Reed)	−24	1 stroke	Smash GC (Note: Brooks Koepka (c), Chase Koepka, Jason Kokrak and Peter Uihlein)
