= 2025 LIV Golf League =

Golf tour season

2025 LIV Golf League season
- Duration: 6 February 2025 – 24 August 2025
- Number of official events: 14
- Most wins: (Chile) Joaquín Niemann (5)
- Individual points list: (Spain) Jon Rahm
- Team champions: Legion XIII
- Money list: (Spain) Jon Rahm
- Most Valuable Player: (Chile) Joaquín Niemann
- Breakout Star of the Year: (Spain) David Puig

The 2025 LIV Golf League was the fourth season of LIV Golf. The season consisted of 54-hole tournaments, featuring 54 players and no cut, with a team championship event at the season end.

== Player movements ==
From the end of the 2024 season until the beginning of the 2025 season saw numerous changes to team rosters.

=== Free agents ===
Players who declined their contract extensions, along with those who finished in places 25–48 of the individual standings, also called the Open Zone, whose contracts expired after the season became free agents and could negotiate with any team. Free agents were not guaranteed to be signed and may have lost their playing privileges in 2025 if they were not signed. The following table lists players who became free agents.

Player	2024 Team	2024 Finish	2025 Team	Ref.
(Spain) Eugenio Chacarra	Fireballs GC	39th	Unsigned	
(United States) Pat Perez	4Aces GC	48th	Unsigned	

=== Relegated players ===
Players who finished in places 49th and below and were not team captains, were relegated from the LIV Golf League and could not be signed by another team unless they earned their way back into the 2025 season through the LIV Golf Promotions event. If a team captain was relegated, then he needed to make a business case to LIV Golf in order to return.

The following table lists players who were relegated after the 2024 season.

Player	2024 Team	2024 Finish	2025 Status
(Finland) Kalle Samooja	Cleeks GC	49th	None
(Zimbabwe) Scott Vincent	Iron Heads GC	50th	None
(South Africa) Branden Grace	Stingers GC	51st	Signed (Note: Grace was re-signed on a two year contract under a "business case" deal.)
(England) Laurie Canter	Wild card	52nd (Note: Canter only played the opening two events as a wild card in 2024 before being replaced by Anthony Kim.)	None
(United States) Bubba Watson	RangeGoats GC	53rd	Signed
(Zimbabwe) Kieran Vincent	Legion XIII GC	54th	None
(United States) Hudson Swafford	Wild card	55th	None
(United States) Anthony Kim	Wild card	56th	Signed

=== Promoted players ===
Player	2024 Tour	Qualification method	2025 Team	Ref.
(Taiwan) Lee Chieh-po	Asian Tour	LIV Golf Promotions	None (Note: Lee was not signed by a team so was allocated one of the two wild cards.)	

=== Newly signed players ===
In addition to qualifying for the 2025 season through the International Series or via the LIV Golf Promotions event, players who have not played for LIV Golf could join the 2025 season by signing with the league or with a team.

Player	2024 Tour	2025 Team	Ref.
(New Zealand) Ben Campbell	Asian Tour	Range Goats GC	
(South Korea) Jang Yu-bin	Korean Tour	Iron Heads GC	
(Denmark) Frederik Kjettrup	PGA Tour Americas	Cleeks GC	
(Spain) Luis Masaveu	N/A (amateur)	Fireballs GC	
(Northern Ireland) Tom McKibbin	European Tour	Legion XIII	

=== Departures ===
The following players (full-time/wildcard only) were no longer with LIV Golf after the conclusion of the 2024 season:

- Hudson Swafford departed from LIV Golf as a wildcard after his contract was not renewed.
- Laurie Canter departed LIV Golf after his two-event wildcard contract ended in 2024 and returned to the European Tour full time.

=== Mid-season transfers ===
Player	From	To	Details	Ref.
(Spain) Luis Masaveu	Fireballs GC	n/a	End of contract	
(Spain) José Luis Ballester	n/a (amateur)	Fireballs GC	New signing	

== Rosters ==
Team	Members				
Team	Captain(s)	Player 2	Player 3	Player 4	Substitute players
4Aces GC	(United States) Dustin Johnson	(United States) Patrick Reed	(United States) Harold Varner III	(Belgium) Thomas Pieters	
Cleeks GC	(Germany) Martin Kaymer	(England) Richard Bland	(Denmark) Frederik Kjettrup	(Poland) Adrian Meronk	(Germany) Max Rottluff (Note: Rottluff substituted for Kjettrup in Dallas.)
Crushers GC	(United States) Bryson DeChambeau	(England) Paul Casey	(United States) Charles Howell III	(India) Anirban Lahiri	
Fireballs GC	(Spain) Sergio García	(Mexico) Abraham Ancer	(Spain) Luis Masaveu (Spain) José Luis Ballester (Note: Ballester was signed mid-season to replace Masaveu, who played in the first 7 events of the season.)	(Spain) David Puig	(Spain) Luis Masaveu (Note: Masaveu sustituted for Puig in Virginia.)
HyFlyers GC	(United States) Phil Mickelson	(United States) Cameron Tringale	(United States) Brendan Steele	(United States) Andy Ogletree	(United States) Ollie Schniederjans (Note: Schniederjans substituted for Mickelson in Riyadh.)
Iron Heads GC	(United States) Kevin Na	(New Zealand) Danny Lee	(South Korea) Jang Yu-bin	(Japan) Jinichiro Kozuma	(Australia) Wade Ormsby (Note: Ormsby substituted for Kozuma in Riyadh and Adelaide.) (United States) Ollie Schniederjans (Note: Schniederjans substituted for Kozuma in Hong Kong.) (United States) John Catlin (Note: Catlin won an 18-hole shootout in order to substitute for Kozuma in Singapore.) (South Korea) Song Young-han (Note: Song substituted for Kozuma in Miami.)
Legion XIII	(Spain) Jon Rahm	(England) Tyrrell Hatton	(United States) Caleb Surratt	(Northern Ireland) Tom McKibbin	
Majesticks GC (Note: Stenson, Poulter, and Westwood are co-captains of Majesticks GC.)	(England) Ian Poulter, (England) Lee Westwood, (Sweden) Henrik Stenson			(England) Sam Horsfield	
RangeGoats GC	(United States) Bubba Watson	(United States) Matthew Wolff	(United States) Peter Uihlein	(New Zealand) Ben Campbell	(United States) John Catlin (Note: Catlin substituted for Campbell in Mexico, after he withdrew following the first round.) (South Korea) Kim Min-kyu (Note: Kim substituted for Campbell in South Korea.) (United States) Ollie Schniederjans (Note: Schniederjans substituted for Wolff in Virginia, after he withdrew with injury, and Dallas.)
Ripper GC	(Australia) Cameron Smith	(Australia) Marc Leishman	(Australia) Matt Jones	(Australia) Lucas Herbert	
Smash GC	(United States) Brooks Koepka	(United States) Jason Kokrak	(United States) Talor Gooch	(Northern Ireland) Graeme McDowell	(Mexico) Luis Carrera (Note: Carrera substituted for Koepka in Dallas after he withdrew with illness after 8 holes of the first round.)
Stinger GC	(South Africa) Louis Oosthuizen	(South Africa) Branden Grace	(South Africa) Charl Schwartzel	(South Africa) Dean Burmester	(United States) John Catlin (Note: Catlin substituted for Grace in South Korea.)
Torque GC	(Chile) Joaquín Niemann	(Chile) Mito Pereira	(Colombia) Sebastián Muñoz	(Mexico) Carlos Ortiz	

=== Wild cards ===
In addition to the teams, in order to make tournament fields up to 54 players, there were two wild card spots available. Anthony Kim, who played as a wild card in 2024, was retained for 2025 and joined by LIV Golf Promotions winner Lee Chieh-po.

=== Reserve players ===
In January 2025, 2024 Asian Tour Order of Merit winner John Catlin confirmed that he would continue to serve as a reserve in the case of withdrawals and other absences. Former amateur world number one Ollie Schniederjans, who finished fourth in the promotions event, also announced that he would act as a reserve. Also retained as reserves were Wade Ormsby; continuing his role from the previous season, Kalle Samooja, who was relegated at the end of 2024, and Saudi Arabian Khalid Attieh.

Schniederjans substituted for Hy Flyers captain Phil Mickelson in the opening event of the season in Riyadh. Also out injured at the start of the season was the Iron Heads' Jinichiro Kozuma; Ormsby substituted for him at Riyadh and his home event at Adelaide, with Schniederjans standing in at Hong Kong; before the fourth event in Singapore, a shootout was held between the four main reserves, with Catlin winning the spot. Korean Song Young-han was added to the roster to substitute for Kozuma in Miami.

The Range Goats Ben Campbell withdrew after the first round in Mexico with a wrist injury, and was replaced by Catlin for the remainder of the tournament. The following week in South Korea, Kim Min-kyu was added to the roster to substitute for him. Having been replaced in the Fireballs lineup by José Luis Ballester before the Virginia event, Luis Masaveu ended up continuing with the team as a substitute for teammate David Puig; during the event, the Range Goats Matthew Wolff withdrew, with Schniederjans substituting for him. At the following event in Dallas, Schniederjans again substituted for Wolff, Max Rottluff substituted for Frederik Kjettrup on the Cleeks, and midway through the first round Brooks Koepka withdrew with an illness and was replaced by Luis Carrera. Wolff remained sidelined in Andalucía, where Masaveu substituted. There were no substitutes required at the final three events of the season.

== Schedule ==
The following table lists official events during the 2025 season.

Date	Tournament	Host country	Purse (US$)		Individual winner (Note: The number in brackets after each winner's name is the number of LIV Golf League events they had won up to and including that tournament.)	Winning team	Notes
Date	Tournament	Host country	Individual	Team	Individual winner	Winning team	Notes
8 Feb	LIV Golf Riyadh	Saudi Arabia	20,000,000	5,000,000	(Poland) Adrian Meronk (1)	Legion XIII	
16 Feb	LIV Golf Adelaide	Australia	20,000,000	5,000,000	(Chile) Joaquín Niemann (3)	Fireballs GC	
9 Mar	LIV Golf Hong Kong	Hong Kong	20,000,000	5,000,000	(Spain) Sergio García (2)	Fireballs GC	
16 Mar	LIV Golf Singapore	Singapore	20,000,000	5,000,000	(Chile) Joaquín Niemann (4)	Fireballs GC	
6 Apr	LIV Golf Miami	United States	20,000,000	5,000,000	(Australia) Marc Leishman (1)	Ripper GC	
27 Apr	LIV Golf Mexico City	Mexico	20,000,000	5,000,000	(Chile) Joaquín Niemann (5)	Legion XIII	New tournament
4 May	LIV Golf Korea	South Korea	20,000,000	5,000,000	(United States) Bryson DeChambeau (3)	Crushers GC	New tournament
8 Jun	LIV Golf Virginia	United States	20,000,000	5,000,000	(Chile) Joaquín Niemann (6)	Crushers GC	New tournament
29 Jun	LIV Golf Dallas	United States	20,000,000	5,000,000	(United States) Patrick Reed (1)	Crushers GC	
13 Jul	LIV Golf Andalucía	Spain	20,000,000	5,000,000	(United States) Talor Gooch (4)	Legion XIII	
27 Jul	LIV Golf UK	United Kingdom	20,000,000	5,000,000	(Chile) Joaquín Niemann (7)	Legion XIII	
10 Aug	LIV Golf Chicago	United States	20,000,000	5,000,000	(South Africa) Dean Burmester (2)	Stinger GC	
17 Aug	LIV Golf Indianapolis	United States	20,000,000	5,000,000	(Colombia) Sebastián Muñoz (1)	Torque GC	New tournament
24 Aug	LIV Team Championship Michigan	United States	n/a	50,000,000	n/a	Legion XIII	Team Championship

== Points list ==
=== Individual points list ===
The individual points list was based on tournament results during the season, calculated using a points-based system.

Position	Player	Team	Points
1	(Spain) Jon Rahm	Legion XIII	226.16
2	(Chile) Joaquín Niemann	Torque GC	223.68
3	(United States) Bryson DeChambeau	Crushers GC	144.74
4	(Colombia) Sebastián Muñoz	Torque GC	133.06
5	(South Africa) Dean Burmester	Stinger GC	117.25

=== Team points list ===
The team points list was based on tournament results during the season, calculated using a points-based system.

Position	Team	Points
1	Legion XIII	−20
2	Crushers GC	−20
3	Stinger GC	−12
4	Smash GC	−18
5	HyFlyers GC	−14

== Money list ==
The money list was based on prize money won during the season, calculated in U.S. dollars.

Position	Player	Prize money ($)		
Position	Player	Individual	Bonus	Total
1	(Spain) Jon Rahm	13,608,791	18,000,000	31,608,791
2	(Chile) Joaquín Niemann	22,222,762	8,000,000	30,222,762
3	(United States) Bryson DeChambeau	10,334,560	4,000,000	14,334,560
4	(South Africa) Dean Burmester	9,828,958		9,828,958
5	(Colombia) Sebastián Muñoz	9,727,953		9,727,953

== Awards ==
Award	Winner	Ref.
Most Valuable Player	(Chile) Joaquín Niemann	
Breakout Star of the Year	(Spain) David Puig	
