= LIV Golf Riyadh =

Professional golf tournament

Tournament information
- Location: Riyadh, Saudi Arabia
- Established: 2022
- Course: Riyadh Golf Club
- Par: 70
- Length: 7,048 yards (6,445 m)
- Tour: LIV Golf
- Format: Individual and team stroke play
- Prize fund: US$20,000,000 (individual); US$10,000,000 (team)
- Month played: February

Tournament record score
- Aggregate: 264 Elvis Smylie (2026)
- To par: −24 as above

Current champion
- (Australia) Elvis Smylie

Final champion
- Location in Saudi Arabia

LIV Golf Riyadh is a professional golf tournament on the LIV Golf League that is held under floodlights at the Riyadh Golf Club, near Riyadh, Saudi Arabia.

The tournament debuted as LIV Golf Jeddah in October 2022 at part of the inaugural LIV Golf Invitational Series, and until 2024 was held at Royal Greens Golf & Country Club in King Abdullah Economic City, north of Jeddah; the first two editions were co-sanctioned by the MENA Tour.

== Format ==
The tournament is an individual stroke play event, with a team element. Four man teams are chosen, with a set number of their total scores counting for the team on each day. Each round commenced with a shotgun start, with the leaders beginning on the first hole for the final round, in order to finish on the eighteenth.

== Winners ==
=== Individual ===
Year	Tour(s) (Note: LIV − LIV Golf League; MENA − MENA Tour.)	Winner	Score	To par	Margin of victory	Runner(s)-up
LIV Golf Riyadh
2026	LIV	(Australia) Elvis Smylie	264	−24	1 stroke	(Spain) Jon Rahm
2025	LIV	(Poland) Adrian Meronk	199	−17	2 strokes	(Colombia) Sebastián Muñoz (Spain) Jon Rahm
LIV Golf Jeddah
2024	LIV	(Chile) Joaquín Niemann	193	−17	4 strokes	(South Africa) Louis Oosthuizen (South Africa) Charl Schwartzel
2023	LIV, MENA	(United States) Brooks Koepka (2)	196	−14	Playoff	(United States) Talor Gooch
LIV Golf Invitational Jeddah
2022	LIV, MENA	(United States) Brooks Koepka	198	−12	Playoff	(United States) Peter Uihlein

=== Team ===
Year	Winners (Note: (c) – Team captain)	Score (to par)	Margin of victory	Runners-up
LIV Golf Riyadh
2026	Ripper GC (Note: Lucas Herbert, Marc Leishman, Cameron Smith (c) and Elvis Smylie.)	−69	3 strokes	Torque GC (Note: Abraham Ancer, Sebastián Muñoz, Joaquín Niemann (c) and Carlos Ortiz.)
2025	Legion XIII GC (Note: Tyrrell Hatton, Tom McKibbin, Jon Rahm (c) and Caleb Surratt)	−50	11 strokes	Ripper GC (Note: Lucas Herbert, Matt Jones, Marc Leishman and Cameron Smith (c).); RangeGoats GC (Note: Ben Campbell, Peter Uihlein, Bubba Watson (c) and Matthew Wolff)
LIV Golf Jeddah
2024	Crushers GC (Note: Paul Casey, Bryson DeChambeau (c), Charles Howell III and Anirban Lahiri)	−38	4 strokes	Stinger GC (Note: Dean Burmester, Branden Grace, Louis Oosthuizen and Charl Schwartzel.)
2023	Fireballs GC (Note: Abraham Ancer, Eugenio Chacarra, Sergio García (c) and Carlos Ortiz)	−34	3 strokes	RangeGoats GC (Note: Talor Gooch, Thomas Pieters, Harold Varner III and Bubba Watson (c))
LIV Golf Invitational Jeddah
2022	Smash GC (Note: Brooks Koepka (c), Chase Koepka, Jason Kokrak and Peter Uihlein)	−33	6 strokes	Fireballs GC
