= 2023 LIV Golf League =

Golf tour season

2023 LIV Golf League season
- Duration: 24 February 2023 – 22 October 2023
- Number of official events: 14
- Most wins: (United States) Talor Gooch (3)
- Individual points list: (United States) Talor Gooch
- Team champions: Crushers GC
- Money list: (United States) Talor Gooch

The 2023 LIV Golf League was the second season of LIV Golf following the inaugural LIV Golf Invitational Series. The season consisted of thirteen 54-hole tournaments, featuring 48 players and no cut, with a team championship event at the season end.

Talor Gooch won three tournaments during the season to claim the individual title by 22 points from Cameron Smith, with Brooks Koepka in third place. The team championship was won by Crushers GC, captained by Bryson DeChambeau, by two strokes from Range Goats GC; 4 Aces GC had topped the regular season points standings but finished in fourth place in the final. Smith, Koepka and DeChambeau all won twice during the season; the other winners were Charles Howell III, Danny Lee, Dustin Johnson and Harold Varner III.

== Broadcasting ==
In the United States, The CW broadcast and streamed the tournaments under a multi-year deal with the organization signed in January 2023. This deal was criticized by the National Press Club as an attempt by Saudi Arabia's monarchy (which finances LIV through a sovereign wealth fund) to sportwash its unflattering reputation after their alleged involvement in the October 2018 assassination of journalist Jamal Khashoggi. As CW stations are only contractually obligated to air the network's prime time schedule, 14 affiliates (eight owned by CBS, five owned by Tegna, and Weigel-owned WCIU) declined to air the LIV telecasts; CW majority owner Nexstar leased airtime on other stations in those markets.

== PGA Tour agreement ==
In June 2023, it was announced that the Public Investment Fund, the PGA Tour and the European Tour would create a new entity to serve the best interests of each entity.

== OWGR points rejection ==
In October 2023, it was announced by the Official World Golf Ranking that LIV Golf's application to receive OWGR points was rejected.

== Teams ==
The 2023 LIV Golf League consisted of twelve teams. Unlike the structure of the 2022 Invitational Series; where some players regularly changed teams from week-to-week, the 2023 season was planned to have players signed to individual teams and will have remained with that team throughout the entire season. LIV Golf began announcing team rosters on 15 February 2023.

=== Starting roster ===
Team	Members (Note: Players presented in order of the LIV Golf final 2023 team rosters announcement.)				
Team	Captain(s)	Player 2	Player 3	Player 4	Substitute players
4Aces GC	(United States) Dustin Johnson	(United States) Patrick Reed	(United States) Peter Uihlein	(United States) Pat Perez	
Cleeks GC	(Germany) Martin Kaymer	(Austria) Bernd Wiesberger	(Northern Ireland) Graeme McDowell	(England) Richard Bland	(England) Laurie Canter (Note: Substituted for Kaymer in Mayakoba, Tucson and Orlando.)
Crushers GC	(United States) Bryson DeChambeau	(England) Paul Casey	(United States) Charles Howell III	(India) Anirban Lahiri	(United States) Andy Ogletree (Note: Substituted for Lahiri in Orlando, and Casey in Washington, D.C.)
Fireballs GC	(Spain) Sergio García	(Mexico) Abraham Ancer	(Mexico) Carlos Ortiz	(Spain) Eugenio Chacarra	
HyFlyers GC	(United States) Phil Mickelson	(United States) Cameron Tringale	(United States) James Piot	(United States) Brendan Steele	
Iron Heads GC	(United States) Kevin Na	(Zimbabwe) Scott Vincent	(United States) Sihwan Kim	(New Zealand) Danny Lee	
Majesticks GC (Note: Stenson, Poulter, and Westwood are co-captains of Majesticks GC.)	(Sweden) Henrik Stenson, (England) Ian Poulter, (England) Lee Westwood			(England) Sam Horsfield	(England) Laurie Canter (Note: Substituted for Horsfield after he withdrew before the third round in Adelaide; and continued to substitute for him in Singapore, Tulsa, Washington, D.C., Andalucía, London, Greenbrier and Bedminster.) (United States) Andy Ogletree (Note: Substituted for Westwood in Tulsa, after he withdrew before the third round.)
RangeGoats GC	(United States) Bubba Watson	(United States) Talor Gooch	(United States) Harold Varner III	(Belgium) Thomas Pieters	(Australia) Wade Ormsby (Note: Substituted for Pieters after he withdrew before the third round in Washington, D.C.)
Ripper GC	(Australia) Cameron Smith	(Australia) Marc Leishman	(Australia) Matt Jones	(Australia) Jediah Morgan	
Smash GC	(United States) Brooks Koepka	(United States) Matthew Wolff	(United States) Jason Kokrak	(United States) Chase Koepka	(Zimbabwe) Kieran Vincent (Note: Substituted for Kokrak in Washington, D.C., after he withdrew before the second round.)
Stinger GC	(South Africa) Louis Oosthuizen	(South Africa) Charl Schwartzel	(South Africa) Branden Grace	(South Africa) Dean Burmester	
Torque GC	(Chile) Joaquín Niemann	(Colombia) Sebastián Muñoz	(Chile) Mito Pereira	(Spain) David Puig	

== Schedule ==
The following table lists official events during the 2023 season.

Date	Tournament	Host country	Purse (US$)		Individual winner (Note: The number in brackets after each winner's name is the number of LIV Golf League events they had won up to and including that tournament.)	Winning team	Other tours (Note: MENA − MENA Tour.)	Notes
Date	Tournament	Host country	Individual	Team	Individual winner	Winning team	Other tours	Notes
26 Feb	LIV Golf Mayakoba	Mexico	20,000,000	5,000,000	(United States) Charles Howell III (1)	Crushers GC	MENA	New tournament
19 Mar	LIV Golf Tucson	United States	20,000,000	5,000,000	(New Zealand) Danny Lee (1)	Fireballs GC	MENA	New tournament
2 Apr	LIV Golf Orlando	United States	20,000,000	5,000,000	(United States) Brooks Koepka (2)	Torque GC	MENA	New tournament
23 Apr	LIV Golf Adelaide	Australia	20,000,000	5,000,000	(United States) Talor Gooch (1)	4Aces GC	MENA	New tournament
30 Apr	LIV Golf Singapore	Singapore	20,000,000	5,000,000	(United States) Talor Gooch (2)	RangeGoats GC	MENA	New tournament
14 May	LIV Golf Tulsa	United States	20,000,000	5,000,000	(United States) Dustin Johnson (2)	Stinger GC	MENA	New tournament
28 May	LIV Golf Washington, D.C.	United States	20,000,000	5,000,000	(United States) Harold Varner III (1)	Torque GC	MENA	New tournament
2 Jul	LIV Golf Andalucía	Spain	20,000,000	5,000,000	(United States) Talor Gooch (3)	Torque GC	MENA	New tournament
9 Jul	LIV Golf London	England	20,000,000	5,000,000	(Australia) Cameron Smith (2)	4Aces GC	MENA	
6 Aug	LIV Golf Greenbrier	United States	20,000,000	5,000,000	(United States) Bryson DeChambeau (1)	Torque GC	MENA	New tournament
13 Aug	LIV Golf Bedminster	United States	20,000,000	5,000,000	(Australia) Cameron Smith (3)	Ripper GC	MENA	
24 Sep	LIV Golf Chicago	United States	20,000,000	5,000,000	(United States) Bryson DeChambeau (2)	Crushers GC	MENA	
15 Oct; ~~5 Nov~~ (Note: In July, LIV Golf announced that Miami would host the team championship to end the season and Jeddah would move to the week prior to Miami.)	LIV Golf Jeddah	Saudi Arabia	20,000,000	5,000,000	(United States) Brooks Koepka (3)	Fireballs GC	MENA	
22 Oct	LIV Golf Miami	United States	n/a	50,000,000	n/a	Crushers GC		Team Championship

== Points list ==
=== Individual points list ===
The individual points list was based on tournament results during the season, calculated using a points-based system.

Position	Player	Team	Points
1	(United States) Talor Gooch	RangeGoats GC	192
2	(Australia) Cameron Smith	Ripper GC	170
3	(United States) Brooks Koepka	Smash GC	152
4	(United States) Bryson DeChambeau	Crushers GC	149
5	(United States) Dustin Johnson	4Aces GC	125

=== Team points list ===
The team points list was based on tournament results during the season, calculated using a points-based system.

Position	Team	Points	TC finish
1	4Aces GC	192	4th
2	Crushers GC	186	1st
3	Torque GC	183	3rd
4	RangeGoats GC	179	2nd
5	Stinger GC	157	5th

== Money list ==
The money list was based on prize money won during the season, calculated in U.S. dollars.

Position	Player	Prize money ($)		
Position	Player	Individual	Bonus	Total
1	(United States) Talor Gooch	17,320,012	18,000,000	35,320,012
2	(Australia) Cameron Smith	11,955,417	10,000,000	21,955,417
3	(United States) Brooks Koepka	13,495,833	4,000,000	17,495,833
4	(United States) Bryson DeChambeau	13,335,000		13,335,000
5	(United States) Harold Varner III	9,125,833		9,125,833

== Relegations ==
Non-exempt players who finished 45th or lower in the individual points list were relegated from the league. Lee Westwood and Martin Kaymer finished 45th and 49th, respectively; however, both were exempt from relegation as they were team captains. Jediah Morgan (46th), James Piot (47th), Chase Koepka (48th), and Sihwan Kim (50th) were relegated from the league.

== Promotions event ==
The LIV Golf Promotions Event is due to be held 8–10 December 2023 at Abu Dhabi Golf Club in the United Arab Emirates.

=== Format ===
The event will take place over three days, with 72 holes being played in total. The first round will be open players finishing 6–32 in the 2023 International Series Order of Merit, winners of leading amateur tournaments, players ranked inside the top-200 of the Official World Golf Ranking and players ranked inside the top-20 of the World Amateur Golf Ranking. The top-20 and ties from the first round advance to the second round, where scores are reset. Also entering at this stage will be players relegated from the 2023 LIV Golf League, tournament winners during the 2022–23 PGA Tour and 2023 European Tour seasons, major champions since 2018, Ryder Cup and Presidents Cup players, and players finishing 2–5 on the 2023 International Series Order of Merit. The top-16 from the second round will advance to the final two rounds, with the scores being reset once again. The top three finishers over the final two rounds will earn status to play in the 2024 LIV Golf League.
