= LIV Golf UK =

Tournament information
- Location: England
- Established: 2022
- Courses: Centurion Club (2022–2023); JCB Golf and Country Club (2024–)
- Par: 72
- Length: 7,084 yards (6,478 m)
- Tours: LIV Golf League; MENA Tour
- Format: Individual and team stroke play
- Prize fund: US$20,000,000 (individual); US$5,000,000 (team)
- Month played: July

Tournament record score
- Aggregate: 258 Lucas Herbert (2026)
- To par: −30 as above

Current champion
- (Australia) Lucas Herbert

Location map
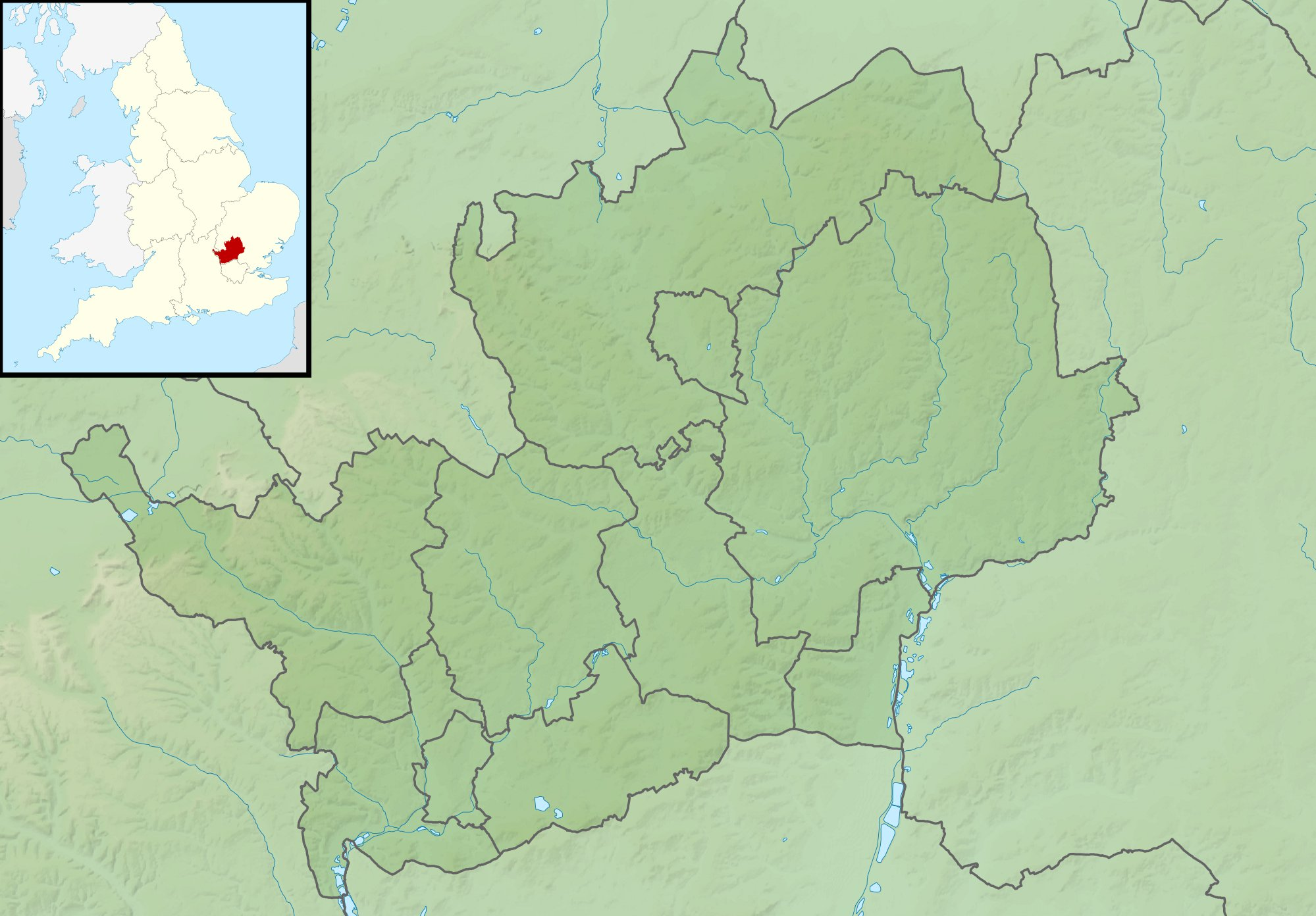
- Location in England Location in Hertfordshire

The LIV Golf UK (formerly LIV Golf London) is a golf tournament that is held in the United Kingdom. The inaugural tournament was held in June 2022 at the Centurion Club near Hemel Hempstead, England, as part of the LIV Golf Invitational Series, a golf series led by Greg Norman and funded by the Saudi Arabian Public Investment Fund. The 2022 48-player field included Phil Mickelson, Dustin Johnson, Sergio García, and Kevin Na.

Charl Schwartzel won the inaugural event, finishing one shot ahead of Hennie du Plessis.

== Format ==
The tournament was a 54-hole individual stroke play event, with a team element. Four man teams were selected via a draft by their designated team captains, with a set number of their total scores counting for the team on each day. Each round commenced with a shotgun start, with the leaders beginning on the first hole for the final round, in order to finish on the eighteenth.

== Inaugural field ==
48 golfers participated in the inaugural LIV London event. 43 players were invited, with the remaining five qualifying through the Asian Tour's International Series; three through an order of merit and the two highest finishers in the International Series England not already in the field. (Note: (a) – Amateur) (Note: (q) – Buranatanyarat, Snyman and Yuan qualified through the International Series order of merit; Madappa and Smyth qualified as highest finishers in the International Series England.)

- Oliver Bekker
- Richard Bland
- Itthipat Buranatanyarat (q)
- Laurie Canter
- Ratchanon Chantananuwat (a)
- Hennie du Plessis
- Oliver Fisher
- Sergio García
- Talor Gooch
- Branden Grace
- Justin Harding
- Sam Horsfield
- Dustin Johnson
- Matt Jones
- Sadom Kaewkanjana
- Martin Kaymer
- Phachara Khongwatmai
- Sihwan Kim
- Ryosuke Kinoshita
- Chase Koepka
- Jinichiro Kozuma
- Pablo Larrazábal
- Viraj Madappa (q)
- Graeme McDowell
- Phil Mickelson
- Jediah Morgan
- Kevin Na
- Shaun Norris
- Andy Ogletree
- Louis Oosthuizen
- Wade Ormsby
- Adrián Otaegui
- Turk Pettit
- James Piot
- Ian Poulter
- David Puig (a)
- J. C. Ritchie
- Charl Schwartzel
- Travis Smyth (q)
- Ian Snyman (q)
- Hudson Swafford
- Hideto Tanihara
- Peter Uihlein
- Scott Vincent
- Lee Westwood
- Bernd Wiesberger
- Blake Windred
- Kevin Yuan (q)

== Winners ==
=== Individual ===
| Year | Tour(s) (Note: LIV − LIV Golf League; MENA − MENA Tour.) | Winner | Score | To par | Margin of victory | Runner(s)-up |
LIV Golf UK
| 2026 | LIV | (Australia) Lucas Herbert | 258 | −30 | 6 strokes | (England) Tyrrell Hatton |
| 2025 | LIV | (Chile) Joaquín Niemann | 196 | −17 | 3 strokes | (United States) Bubba Watson |
| 2024 | LIV | (Spain) Jon Rahm | 200 | −13 | 1 stroke | (England) Tyrrell Hatton (Chile) Joaquín Niemann (Australia) Cameron Smith |
LIV Golf London
| 2023 | LIV, MENA | (Australia) Cameron Smith | 198 | −15 | 1 stroke | (Australia) Marc Leishman (United States) Patrick Reed |
LIV Golf Invitational London
| 2022 | LIV | (South Africa) Charl Schwartzel | 203 | −7 | 1 stroke | (South Africa) Hennie du Plessis |

=== Team ===
| Year | Winners (Note: (c) – Team captain) | Score (to par) | Margin of victory | Runners-up |
LIV Golf UK
| 2026 | | | | |
| 2025 | | | | |
| 2024 | Legion XII (Note: Tyrrell Hatton, Jon Rahm (c), Caleb Surratt and Kieran Vincent) | −26 | 3 strokes | Ripper GC (Note: Lucas Herbert, Matt Jones, Marc Leishman, Wade Ormsby and Cameron Smith (c)) |
LIV Golf London
| 2023 | 4Aces GC (Note: Dustin Johnson (c), Pat Perez, Patrick Reed and Peter Uihlein) | −34 | 1 stroke | Ripper GC (Note: Matt Jones, Marc Leishman, Jediah Morgan and Cameron Smith (c)) |
LIV Golf Invitational London
| 2022 | Stinger GC (Note: Hennie du Plessis, Branden Grace, Louis Oosthuizen (c) and Charl Schwartzel) | −20 | 14 strokes | Crushers GC (Note: Richard Bland, Phachara Khongwatmai, Travis Smyth and Peter Uihlein (c)) |
