= LIV Golf Invitational Portland =

Tournament information
- Location: North Plains, Oregon
- Established: 2022
- Course: Pumpkin Ridge Golf Club
- Par: 72
- Length: 7,641 yards (6,987 m)
- Tour: LIV Golf
- Format: Individual and team stroke play
- Prize fund: US$20,000,000 (individual); US$5,000,000 (team)
- Month played: June/July
- Final year: 2022

Tournament record score
- Aggregate: 203 Branden Grace (2022)
- To par: −13 as above

Final champion
- (South Africa) Branden Grace

Location map
- Location in the United States Location in Oregon

The LIV Golf Invitational Portland was a professional golf tournament that was held in North Plains, Oregon, outside of Portland at Pumpkin Ridge Golf Club. The inaugural tournament was held in July 2022 as part of the LIV Golf Invitational Series, a golf series led by Greg Norman and funded by the Saudi Arabian Public Investment Fund.

== Format ==
The tournament was a 54-hole individual stroke play event, with a team element. Four man teams were selected via a draft by their designated team captains, with a set number of their total scores counting for the team on each day. Each round commenced with a shotgun start, with the leaders beginning on the first hole for the final round, in order to finish on the eighteenth.

== Inaugural field ==
48 golfers participated in the inaugural LIV Portland event. 48 golfers were invited to play. (Note: (c) – Team captain)

- Abraham Ancer (Note: Ancer, Chacarra, Dechambeau, Inamori, Brooks Koepka, Ortiz, Perez, Reed and Wolff made their first appearances in the series.)
- Richard Bland
- Itthipat Buranatanyarat
- Laurie Canter
- Eugenio Chacarra
- Bryson DeChambeau (c)
- Hennie du Plessis
- Sergio García (c)
- Talor Gooch
- Branden Grace
- Justin Harding
- Sam Horsfield
- Yuki Inamori
- Dustin Johnson (c)
- Matt Jones
- Sadom Kaewkanjana
- Martin Kaymer (c)
- Phachara Khongwatmai
- Sihwan Kim
- Ryosuke Kinoshita
- Brooks Koepka (c)
- Chase Koepka
- Jinichiro Kozuma
- Graeme McDowell (c)
- Phil Mickelson (c)
- Jediah Morgan
- Kevin Na (c)
- Shaun Norris
- Louis Oosthuizen (c)
- Wade Ormsby (c)
- Carlos Ortiz
- Adrián Otaegui
- Pat Perez
- Turk Pettit
- James Piot
- Ian Poulter
- Patrick Reed
- Travis Smyth
- Ian Snyman
- Hudson Swafford
- Charl Schwartzel
- Hideto Tanihara (c)
- Peter Uihlein
- Scott Vincent
- Lee Westwood (c)
- Bernd Wiesberger
- Blake Windred
- Matthew Wolff

=== Teams ===
- 4 Aces GC: Johnson (c), Gooch, Perez, Reed
- Cleeks GC: Kaymer (c), Pettit, Snyman, Vincent
- Crusher GC: DeChambeau (c), Harding, Norris, Uihlein
- Fireball GC: García (c), Ancer, Chacarra, Ortiz
- HY Flyers GC: Mickelson (c), Buranatanyarat, Wiesberger, Wolff
- Iron Heads GC: Na (c), Kaewkanjana, Khongwatmai, Kim
- Majesticks GC: Westwood (c), Canter, Horsfield, Poulter
- Niblicks GC: McDowell (c), Piot, Smyth, Swafford
- Punch GC: Ormsby (c), Jones, Morgan, Windred
- Smash GC: B. Koepka (c), Bland, C. Koepka, Otaegui
- Stinger GC: Oosthuizen (c), du Plessis, Grace, Schwartzel
- Torque GC: Tanihara (c), Kinoshita, Kozuma, Inamori

== Winners ==
=== Individual ===
| Year | Winner | Score | To par | Margin of victory | Runner-up |
|---|---|---|---|---|---|
| 2022 | (South Africa) Branden Grace | 203 | −13 | 2 strokes | (Mexico) Carlos Ortiz |

=== Team ===
| Year | Winners | Score (to par) | Margin of victory | Runners-up |
|---|---|---|---|---|
| 2022 | 4Aces GC (Note: Talor Gooch, Dustin Johnson (c), Pat Perez and Patrick Reed) | −23 | 7 strokes | Stinger GC (Note: Hennie du Plessis, Branden Grace, Louis Oosthuizen (c) and Charl Schwartzel) |
