= LIV Golf Andalucía =

Professional golf tournament

Tournament information
- Location: Andalusia, Spain
- Established: 2023
- Course: Valderrama Golf Club
- Par: 71
- Length: 7,010 yards (6,410 m)
- Tours: LIV Golf; MENA Tour
- Format: Individual and team stroke play
- Prize fund: US$20,000,000 (individual); US$5,000,000 (team)
- Month played: June

Tournament record score
- Aggregate: 201 Talor Gooch (2023)
- To par: −12 as above

Current champion
- (England) Tyrrell Hatton

Location map
- Location in Spain Location in Andalusia

LIV Golf Andalucía is a professional golf tournament in Spain, that is held at Valderrama Golf Club in Andalusia. It is an event on the LIV Golf League. It debuted in July 2023. The first event was co-sanctioned by the MENA Tour.

== Format ==
The tournament is a 72-hole individual stroke play event, with a team element. Four man teams are chosen, with a set number of their total scores counting for the team on each day. Each round commenced with a shotgun start, with the leaders beginning on the first hole for the final round, in order to finish on the eighteenth.

== Winners ==
=== Individual ===
Year	Tour(s) (Note: LIV − LIV Golf League; MENA − MENA Tour.)	Winner	Score	To par	Margin of victory	Runner-up	Ref.
2026	LIV	(England) Tyrrell Hatton	273	−11	2 strokes	(Spain) Jon Rahm	
2025	LIV	(United States) Talor Gooch (2)	205	−8	1 stroke	(Spain) Jon Rahm	
2024	LIV	(Spain) Sergio García	208	−5	Playoff	(India) Anirban Lahiri	
2023	LIV, MENA	(United States) Talor Gooch	201	−12	1 stroke	(United States) Bryson Dechambeau	

=== Team ===
Year	Winners (Note: (c) – Team captain)	Score (to par)	Margin of victory	Runners-up
2026				
2025				
2024	Fireballs GC (Note: Abraham Ancer, Eugenio Chacarra, Sergio García (c) and David Puig)	−5	Playoff	Crushers GC (Note: Paul Casey, Bryson Dechambeau (c), Charles Howell III and Anirban Lahiri.)
2023	Torque GC (Note: Sebastián Muñoz, Joaquín Niemann (c), Mito Pereira and David Puig)	−16	5 strokes	RangeGoats GC (Note: Talor Gooch, Thomas Pieters, Harold Varner III and Bubba Watson (c))
