= 2022–23 MENA Tour =

Golf tour season

2022–23 MENA Tour season
- Duration: 7 October 2022 – 15 October 2023
- Number of official events: 22
- Most wins: (United States) Talor Gooch (3) (United States) Brooks Koepka (3)
- Order of Merit: (United States) Brooks Koepka

The 2022–23 MENA Tour was the 10th season of the MENA Tour.

== LIV Golf strategic alliance ==
Following an announcement made in October 2022, the MENA Tour announced that they had entered into a strategic alliance with LIV Golf. This was mainly due to LIV Golf attempting to gain Official World Golf Ranking points for their events by co-sanctioning them with the MENA Tour. The proposals were initially rejected by the OWGR. The first tournament added to the 2022–23 schedule was an event held in Thailand, co-sanctioned by the LIV Golf Invitational Series.

== Schedule ==
The following table lists official events during the 2022–23 season.

Date	Tournament	Host country	Purse (US$)	Winner (Note: The number in brackets after each winner's name is the number of MENA Tour events they had won up to and including that tournament.)	OWGR points	Other tours (Note: LIV − LIV Golf League.)
9 Oct	LIV Golf Invitational Bangkok	Thailand	20,000,000	(Spain) Eugenio Chacarra (1)	n/a	LIV
16 Oct	LIV Golf Invitational Jeddah	Saudi Arabia	20,000,000	(United States) Brooks Koepka (1)	n/a	LIV
30 Nov	Tournament 3	Saudi Arabia	75,000	(England) Bailey Gill (2)	0.44	
5 Dec	Tournament 4	Saudi Arabia	75,000	(Italy) Aron Zemmer (1)	0.44	
2 Feb	Egyptian Swing 1	Egypt	75,000	(England) Ben Jones (1)	0.66	
7 Feb	Egyptian Swing 2	Egypt	75,000	(England) Brandon Robinson-Thompson (1)	0.64	
26 Feb	LIV Golf Mayakoba	Mexico	20,000,000	(United States) Charles Howell III (1)	n/a	LIV
19 Mar	LIV Golf Tucson	United States	20,000,000	(New Zealand) Danny Lee (1)	n/a	LIV
2 Apr	LIV Golf Orlando	United States	20,000,000	(United States) Brooks Koepka (2)	n/a	LIV
13 Apr	Malaysian Swing I	Malaysia	75,000	(England) Joe Heraty (2)	0.52	
20 Apr	Malaysian Swing II	Malaysia	75,000	(England) William Harrold (2)	0.55	
23 Apr	LIV Golf Adelaide	Australia	20,000,000	(United States) Talor Gooch (1)	n/a	LIV
27 Apr	Royal Hua Hin Thailand Championship	Thailand	75,000	(Hong Kong) Matthew Cheung (1)	1.07	
30 Apr	LIV Golf Singapore	Singapore	20,000,000	(United States) Talor Gooch (2)	n/a	LIV
14 May	LIV Golf Tulsa	United States	20,000,000	(United States) Dustin Johnson (1)	n/a	LIV
28 May	LIV Golf Washington, D.C.	United States	20,000,000	(United States) Harold Varner III (1)	n/a	LIV
2 Jul	LIV Golf Andalucía	Spain	20,000,000	(United States) Talor Gooch (3)	n/a	LIV
9 Jul	LIV Golf London	England	20,000,000	(Australia) Cameron Smith (1)	n/a	LIV
6 Aug	LIV Golf Greenbrier	United States	20,000,000	(United States) Bryson DeChambeau (1)	n/a	LIV
13 Aug	LIV Golf Bedminster	United States	20,000,000	(Australia) Cameron Smith (2)	n/a	LIV
24 Sep	LIV Golf Chicago	United States	20,000,000	(United States) Bryson DeChambeau (2)	n/a	LIV
15 Oct; ~~5 Nov~~ (Note: In July 2023, LIV Golf announced that Miami would host the team championship to end the season, and Jeddah would move to the week prior to Miami.)	LIV Golf Jeddah	Saudi Arabia	20,000,000	(United States) Brooks Koepka (3)	n/a	LIV

== Order of Merit ==
The Order of Merit was based on tournament results during the season, calculated using a points-based system.

Position	Player	Points
1	(United States) Brooks Koepka	18,098,333
2	(United States) Talor Gooch	17,784,012
3	(Australia) Cameron Smith	14,258,917
4	(United States) Bryson DeChambeau	13,777,500
5	(United States) Patrick Reed	10,223,547
