= LIV Golf Adelaide =

Professional golf tournament

Tournament information
- Location: Grange, South Australia, Australia
- Established: 2023
- Course: The Grange Golf Club
- Par: 72
- Length: 6,946 yards (6,351 m)
- Tours: LIV Golf; MENA Tour
- Format: Individual and team stroke play
- Prize fund: US$20,000,000 (individual); US$5,000,000 (team)
- Month played: February

Tournament record score
- Aggregate: 265 Anthony Kim (2026)
- To par: −23 as above

Current champion
- (United States) Anthony Kim

Location map
- Location in Australia Location in South Australia

LIV Golf Adelaide is a professional golf tournament sponsored by LIV Golf in Australia, held at The Grange Golf Club in Grange, a northwest suburb of Adelaide. It debuted in the 2023 LIV Golf Season, with the first event also being co-sanctioned by the MENA Tour.

LIV Golf Adelaide was awarded the best golf event in the world in 2023 and 2024 at the World Golf Awards.

LIV Golf Adelaide will be held at the Kooyonga Golf Club in 2027, and at the newly renovated North Adelaide Golf Course beginning in 2028.

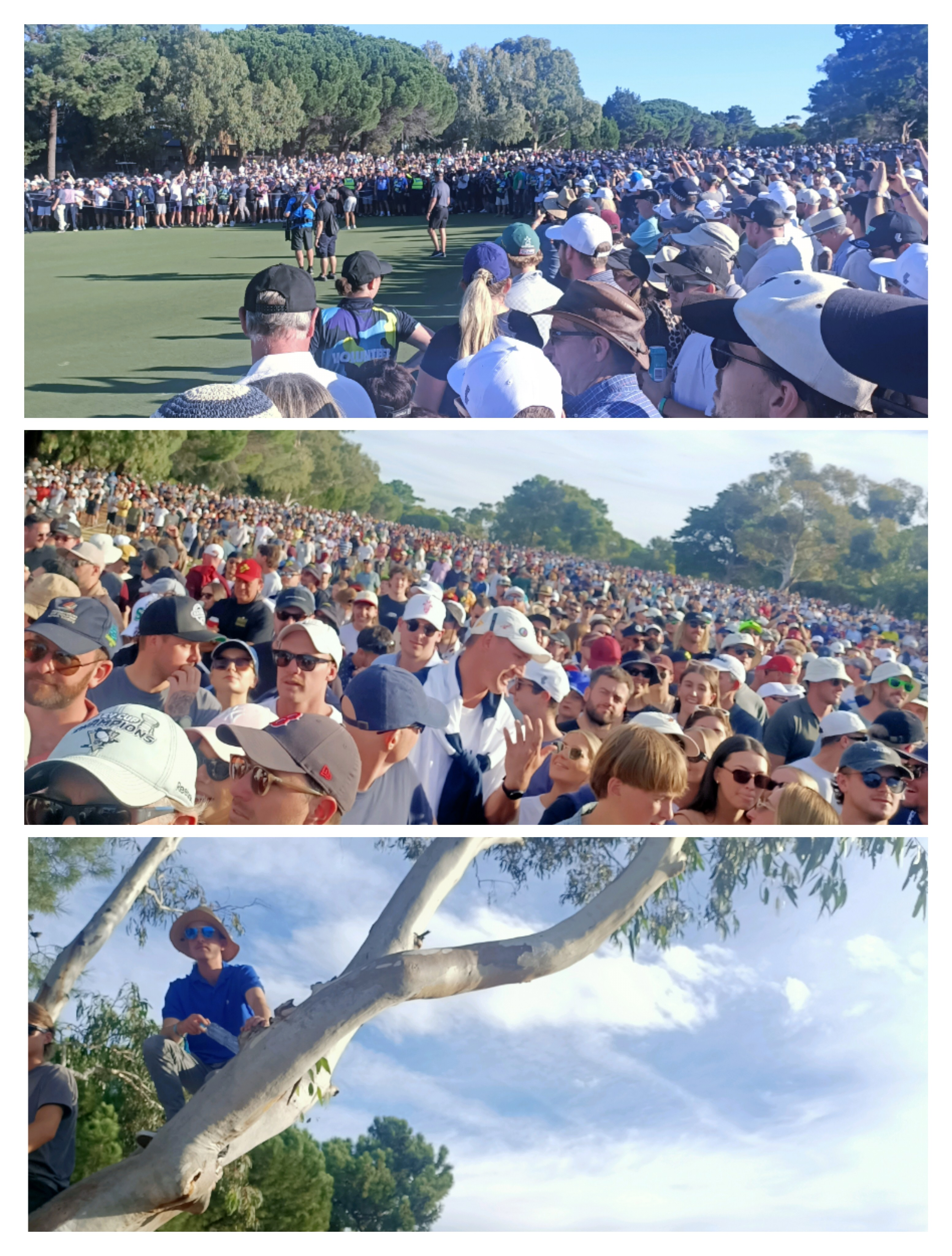
LIVGolf Adelaide patrons

== Format ==
The tournament is a 72-hole individual stroke play event, with a team element. Four man teams are chosen, with a set number of their total scores counting for the team on each day. Each round commenced with a shotgun start, with the leaders beginning on the first hole for the final round, in order to finish on the eighteenth.

== Winners ==
=== Individual ===
Year	Tour(s) (Note: LIV − LIV Golf League; MENA − MENA Tour.)	Winner	Score	To par	Margin of victory	Runner(s)-up
2026	LIV	(United States) Anthony Kim	265	−23	3 strokes	(Spain) Jon Rahm
2025	LIV	(Chile) Joaquín Niemann	203	−13	3 strokes	(Mexico) Abraham Ancer (Mexico) Carlos Ortiz
2024	LIV	(United States) Brendan Steele	198	−18	1 stroke	(South Africa) Louis Oosthuizen
2023	LIV, MENA	(United States) Talor Gooch	197	−19	3 strokes	(India) Anirban Lahiri

=== Team ===
Year	Winners (Note: (c) – Team captain)	Score (to par)	Margin of victory	Runners-up
2026	Ripper GC (Note: Lucas Herbert, Marc Leishman, Cameron Smith (c) and Elvis Smylie)	−55	2 strokes	Legion XIII (Note: Tyrrell Hatton, Tom McKibbin, Jon Rahm (c) and Caleb Surratt)
2025	Fireballs GC (Note: Abraham Ancer, Sergio García (c), Luis Masaveu and David Puig)	−21	6 strokes	Legion XIII
2024	Ripper GC (Note: Lucas Herbert, Matt Jones, Marc Leishman and Cameron Smith (c))	−53	Playoff	Stinger GC (Note: Dean Burmester, Branden Grace, Louis Oosthuizen (c) and Charl Schwartzel)
2023	4Aces GC (Note: Dustin Johnson (c), Pat Perez, Patrick Reed and Peter Uihlein)	−47	1 stroke	RangeGoats GC (Note: Talor Gooch, Thomas Pieters, Harold Varner III and Bubba Watson (c))
