= LIV Golf Greenbrier =

Professional golf tournament

Tournament information
- Location: White Sulphur Springs, West Virginia
- Established: 2023
- Courses: The Greenbrier; Old White Course
- Par: 70
- Length: 7,255 yards (6,634 m)
- Tour: LIV Golf
- Format: Individual and team stroke play
- Prize fund: US$20,000,000 (individual); US$5,000,000 (team)
- Month played: August

Tournament record score
- Aggregate: 187 Bryson DeChambeau (2023)
- To par: −23 as above

Current champion
- (United States) Brooks Koepka

Location map
- Location in the United States Location in South West Virginia

LIV Golf Greenbrier is a professional golf tournament sponsored by LIV Golf in the United States, held at The Greenbrier in White Sulphur Springs, West Virginia. It debuted in August 2023. The first event was also co-sponsored by the MENA Tour.

== Format ==
The tournament is a 54-hole individual stroke play event, with a team element. Four man teams are chosen, with a set number of their total scores counting for the team on each day. Each round commenced with a shotgun start, with the leaders beginning on the first hole for the final round, in order to finish on the eighteenth.

== Winners ==
=== Individual ===
Year	Winner	Score	To par	Margin of victory	Runner-up
2024	(United States) Brooks Koepka	191	−19	Playoff	(Spain) Jon Rahm
2023	(United States) Bryson DeChambeau	187	−23	6 strokes	(Chile) Mito Pereira

=== Team ===
Year	Winners (Note: (c) – Team captain)	Score (to par)	Margin of victory	Runners-up
2024	Smash GC (Note: Talor Gooch, Brooks Koepka (c), Jason Kokrak and Graeme McDowell)	−53	3 strokes	Ripper GC
2023	Torque GC (Note: Sebastián Muñoz, Joaquín Niemann (c), Mito Pereira and David Puig)	−49	3 strokes	Crushers GC (Note: Paul Casey, Bryson DeChambeau (c), Charles Howell III and Anirban Lahiri)
