= LIV Golf Mayakoba =

Professional golf tournament

LIV Golf Mexico City
Tournament information
- Location: Playa del Carmen, Quintana Roo, Mexico
- Established: 2023
- Course: El Camaleon Golf Club
- Par: 71
- Length: 7,116 yards (6,507 m)
- Tour: LIV Golf
- Format: Individual and team stroke play
- Prize fund: US$20,000,000 (individual); US$5,000,000 (team)
- Month played: February

Tournament record score
- Aggregate: 263 Jon Rahm (2026)
- To par: −21 as above

Current champion
- (Spain) Jon Rahm

Final champion
- Location in Mexico Location in Quintana Roo

The LIV Golf Mexico City (formerly LIV Golf Mayakoba) is a professional golf tournament sponsored by LIV Golf in Mexico, held at Playa del Carmen, south of Cancún. It debuted in February 2023. The first event was also co-sponsored by the MENA Tour.

== Format ==
The tournament is a 72-hole individual stroke play event, with a team element. Four man teams are chosen, with a set number of their total scores counting for the team on each day. Each round commenced with a shotgun start, with the leaders beginning on the first hole for the final round, in order to finish on the eighteenth.

== Winners ==
=== Individual ===
Year	Tour(s) (Note: LIV − LIV Golf League; MENA − MENA Tour.)	Winner	Score	To par	Margin of victory	Runner(s)-up
LIV Golf Mexico City
2026	LIV	(Spain) Jon Rahm	263	−21	6 strokes	(Spain) David Puig
2025	LIV	(Chile) Joaquín Niemann (2)	197	−16	3 strokes	(United States) Bryson DeChambeau (Australia) Lucas Herbert
LIV Golf Mayakoba
2024	LIV	(Chile) Joaquín Niemann	201	−12	Playoff	(Spain) Sergio García
2023	LIV, MENA	(United States) Charles Howell III	197	−16	4 strokes	(United States) Peter Uihlein

=== Team ===
Year	Winners (Note: (c) – Team captain)	Score (to par)	Margin of victory	Runners-up
LIV Golf Mexico City
2026	Legion XIII (Note: Tyrrell Hatton, Tom McKibbin, Jon Rahm (c) and Caleb Surratt) (3)			
2025	Legion XIII (2)	−28	2 strokes	Ripper GC (Note: Lucas Herbert, Matt Jones, Marc Leishman and Cameron Smith (c))
LIV Golf Mayakoba
2024	Legion XIII (Note: Tyrrell Hatton, Jon Rahm (c), Caleb Surratt and Kieran Vincent)	−24	4 strokes	Crushers GC (Note: Paul Casey, Bryson DeChambeau (c), Charles Howell III and Anirban Lahiri)
2023	Crushers GC	−26	9 strokes	4Aces GC (Note: Dustin Johnson (c), Pat Perez, Patrick Reed and Peter Uihlein)
