= Trump National Golf Club Bedminster =

Golf club in Bedminster, New Jersey

Trump National Golf Club

- Location within the United States Location within New Jersey
- 40.653°N 74.695°W

Club information
- Location: Bedminster, New Jersey, United States
- Elevation: 200 feet (60 m)
- Established: 2004, 22 years ago
- Type: Private
- Total holes: 36
- Tournaments: 2009 U.S. Junior Amateur Championship; 2009 U.S. Girls' Junior Championship; 2017 U.S. Women's Open; 2022–2023 LIV Golf Bedminster
- Greens: A-4 Bentgrass
- Fairways: L-93 Bentgrass
- Website: trumpnationalbedminster.com

Old Course
- Designed by: Tom Fazio and Tom Fazio II
- Par: 72
- Length: 7,580 yards (6,931 m)
- Course rating: 76.8
- Slope rating: 151

New Course
- Designed by: Tom Fazio
- Par: 72
- Length: 7,511 yards (6,868 m)
- Course rating: 76.6
- Slope rating: 149
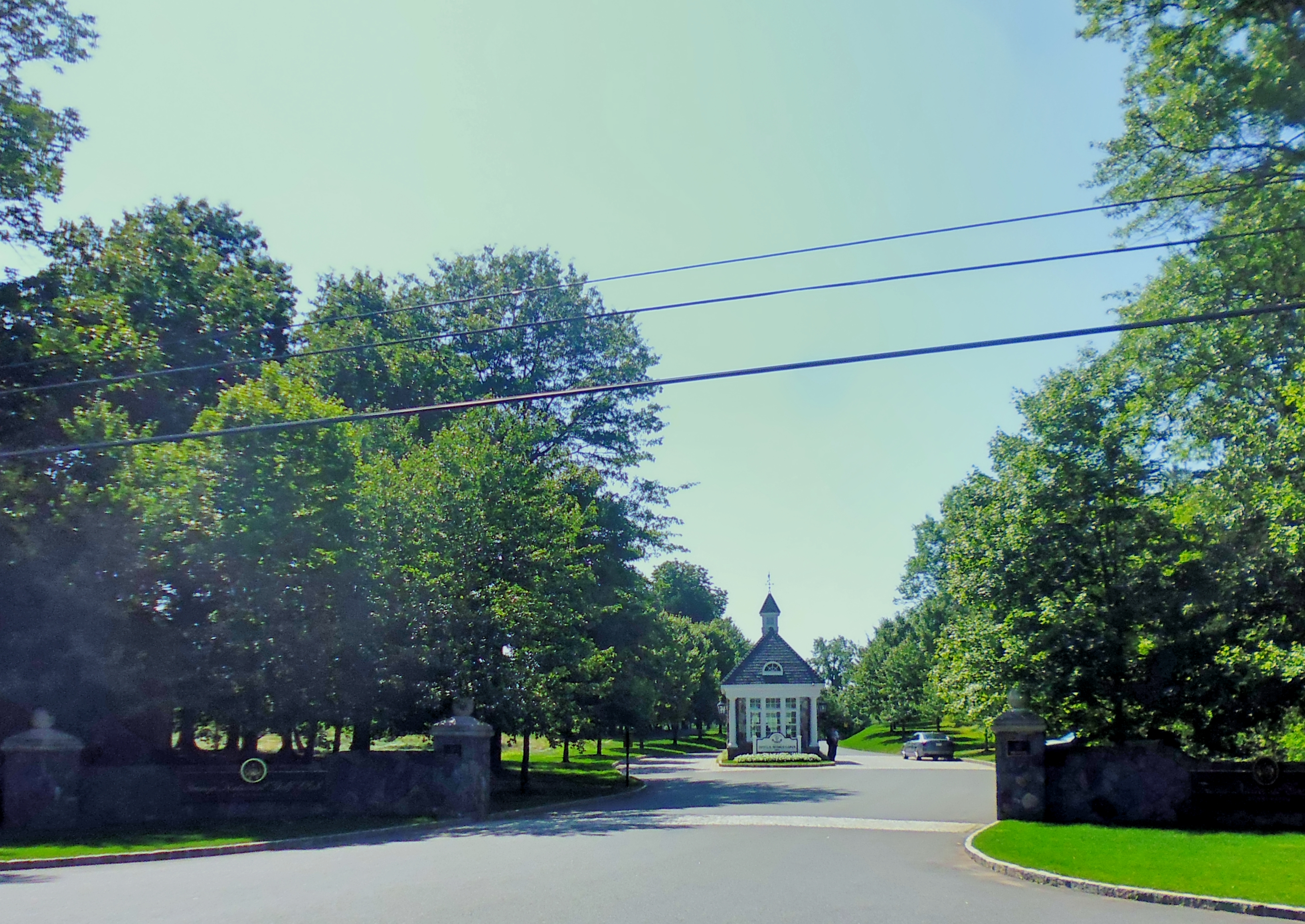
- Entrance with gatehouse, 2017

Trump National Golf Club is a private golf club located on Lamington Road in Bedminster, New Jersey, United States. Approximately 40 miles (64 km) west of New York City in Somerset County, it is owned and operated by the Trump Organization.

== History ==
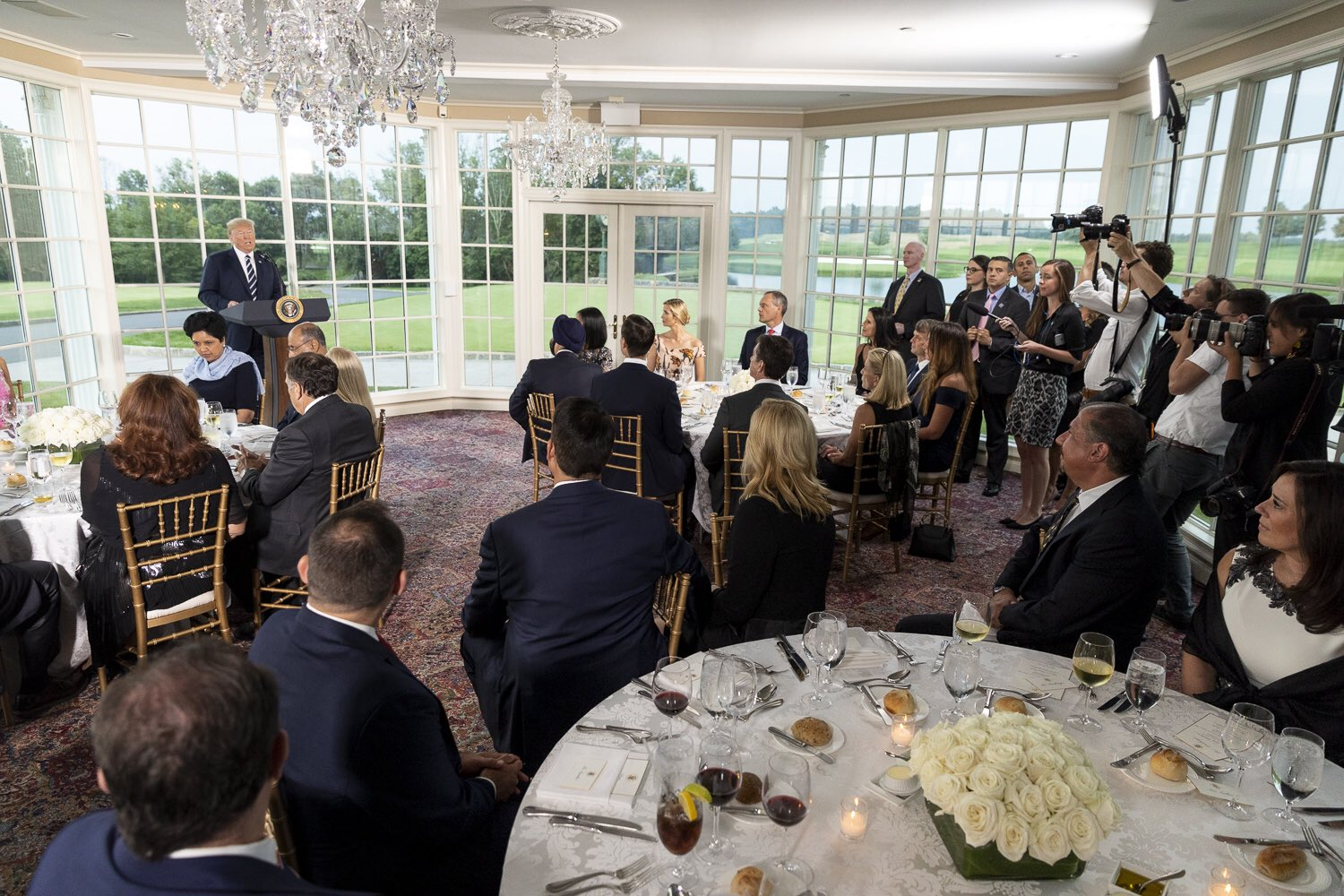
Trump National Golf Club's main clubhouse, a renovated 1930s Georgian Revival Manor

Donald Trump bought the 520 acres (210 ha) property, which included the estate of automaker John DeLorean, for less than US$35 million in 2002. It was previously known as Lamington Farm and the site of a floundering golf course construction project. The 36-hole club was designed by golf course architects Tom Fazio and Tom Fazio II. The first course opened in 2004.

The course was ranked 73rd in the United States in 2005 by Golf Magazine was ranked 84th by Golf Digest for 2005 and 2006. The club hosted the wedding of Trump's daughter, Ivanka Trump, in October 2009. As reported in 2012, membership in the golf club cost then at the most $300,000.

The club hosted three editions of the Saudi Arabian–sponsored LIV Golf series, interchangeably known as LIV Golf Bedminster or LIV Golf New York.

== Majors host ==
The golf club hosted the U.S. Women's Open from July 13 to 16, 2017. In 2014, the Professional Golfers' Association of America awarded the course as the host of the 2022 PGA Championship.

On January 10, 2021, the PGA of America stripped the course of the PGA Championship in 2022. The decision was taken because it was felt that hosting the tournament at the course would be "detrimental to the PGA of America brand". The decision was taken several days after Trump was accused of encouraging the storming of the United States Capitol.

Year	Major	Winner	Score	Margin of Victory	Runner(s) Up	Winner's Share ($)
2017	U.S. Women's Open	(South Korea) Park Sung-hyun	277 (−11)	1 stroke	(South Korea) Choi Hye-jin (a)	900,000

== Trump presidency ==
Donald Trump uses a small cottage next to the communal swimming pool as his private residence, with a matching cottage used by Ivanka and her husband Jared Kushner. In November 2016, after Trump won the 2016 United States presidential election, the clubhouse was used to host meetings for his presidential transition. Representative Leonard Lance predicted that the resort could become "Camp David North". In 2017 it became one of the three official presidential residences, the other two being – at that time – Trump Tower in New York and Mar-a-Lago in Florida. White House staffers receive the same discounts (15–70%) as club members at the club's pro shop, an arrangement that was flagged as "absolutely wrong" by Citizens for Responsibility and Ethics in Washington.

In May 2017, Trump started to use the property for weekend retreats during the summer when Mar-a-Lago is closed for the season. Trump stated that staying at his property in Bedminster is less expensive and disruptive than going to Trump Tower in New York. This made the property the "Summer White House". It is usually used from May to September. In August 2017, the estate was used as a "working vacation" of the president for a duration of 17 days while the White House underwent renovations approved by the Obama administration and overseen by the Trump administration.

In August 2018, the estate became again the site of the President's "working vacation" for close to two weeks.

Trump went for another "working vacation" at his golf club also in August 2019 while the White House underwent some fix ups.

In 2020, Trump stayed at the golf club on a number of occasions. On October 1, he held a fundraising event at the mansion. Several hours later, after he was back in Washington, it was announced that his COVID-19 test was positive.

On early July 14, 2024, the day after his first assassination attempt, Trump went to the Trump National Golf Club Bedminster where he rested and was reportedly seen playing a round of golf.

=== Security issues ===
Due to security concerns, temporary flight restrictions are imposed by the Federal Aviation Administration within a 30-mile (48 km) radius during Trump's stays at his golf club. Restrictions affect 19 airports in New Jersey and Pennsylvania, among them two airports that have to close down completely because they are within a 10 mile-radius, namely Solberg–Hunterdon Airport in Readington Township and Somerset Airport in Bedminster. Additionally, Academy of Model Aviation Clubs cannot fly model airplanes in this same 30-mile radius.

With the official designation as an official residence of Trump, Congress appropriated up to $41 million for its security costs in the time between inauguration and October 1, 2017.

== Tax status ==
As much of the estate is used for agriculture, mainly growing hay and raising a small herd of goats, for tax purposes part of the Bedminster course and the Trump course in Colts Neck Township qualify as farmland. The Wall Street Journal estimated that the use of the property tax exemption for farmland reduced the tax bill on the two golf courses from $80,000 to less than $1,000. The director of the New Jersey chapter of the Sierra Club said that Trump was "hiding behind a farmland assessment to get a massive tax break on a golf course."

== Trump family cemetery ==
In 2015, Trump received the approval to build a family cemetery at the estate that would include a classical mausoleum.

Ivana Trump, Trump's ex-wife and mother to Donald Jr., Ivanka, and Eric Trump, was buried in the Trump family cemetery on July 20, 2022.

== See also ==
- 2024 New Jersey drone sightings
- Donald Trump and golf
- List of things named after Donald Trump
- List of residences of presidents of the United States
