= 2022 LIV Golf Invitational Series =

Golf tour season

2022 LIV Golf Invitational Series season
- Duration: 9 June 2022 – 30 October 2022
- Number of official events: 8
- Individual points list: (United States) Dustin Johnson
- Team champions: 4Aces GC (Note: Talor Gooch, Dustin Johnson, Pat Perez and Patrick Reed)
- Money list: (United States) Dustin Johnson

The 2022 LIV Golf Invitational Series was the inaugural season of LIV Golf. The season consisted of seven 54-hole tournaments, featuring 48 players and no cut, with a team championship event at the season end.

== Development ==
On 17 March 2022, the first eight tournament schedule with prize money of US$255,000,000 was announced by Greg Norman. The 54-hole tournaments had no cut and featured 48 players drafted into 12 four-man teams, with shotgun starts. The first seven events had $20 million purses with an additional $5 million split among the top three teams each week; a team championship concluded the schedule with a $30 million on offer to the top three players and an additional $50 million in team prizes.

== Broadcasting ==
LIV Golf broadcast events on its website and on its own YouTube and Facebook pages. Arlo White served as lead broadcaster with pundits Jerry Foltz and Dom Boulet. Su-Ann Heng served as an on-course reporter and Troy Mullins was billed as both on-course reporter and influencer for the tour. In July, it was confirmed that David Feherty would be leaving NBC Sports to join the LIV Golf broadcast team.

In the U.S., LIV Golf attempted to buy time on Fox as its broadcaster, but were unable to reach an agreement. All of the remaining major television networks in the U.S. have ties to the PGA Tour's media rights, and Turner Sports was under the purview of Warner Bros. Discovery, which served as the tour's major broadcaster overseas, which would have effectively prevented them from airing LIV Golf due to its animosity. Likewise, PGA Tour media partners largely avoided direct references to LIV during golf telecasts, only discussing it from a critical perspective.

== Teams ==
- 4Aces GC
- Cleeks GC
- Crusher GC
- Fireball GC
- HY Flyers GC
- Iron Heads GC
- Majesticks GC
- Niblicks GC
- Punch GC
- Smash GC
- Stinger GC
- Torque GC

== Schedule ==
The following table lists official events during the 2022 season.

| Date | Tournament | Host country | Purse (US$) | | Winner (Note: The number in brackets after each winner's name is the number of LIV Golf Invitational Series events they had won up to and including that tournament.) | | Other tours (Note: MENA − MENA Tour.) | Notes |
| Date | Tournament | Host country | Individual | Team | Individual | Team | Other tours | Notes |
|---|---|---|---|---|---|---|---|---|
| 11 Jun | LIV Golf Invitational London | England | 20,000,000 | 5,000,000 | (South Africa) Charl Schwartzel (1) | Stinger GC (Note: Hennie du Plessis, Branden Grace, Louis Oosthuizen and Charl Schwartzel) | | |
| 2 Jul | LIV Golf Invitational Portland | United States | 20,000,000 | 5,000,000 | (South Africa) Branden Grace (1) | 4Aces GC | | |
| 31 Jul | LIV Golf Invitational Bedminster | United States | 20,000,000 | 5,000,000 | (Sweden) Henrik Stenson (1) | 4Aces GC | | |
| 4 Sep | LIV Golf Invitational Boston | United States | 20,000,000 | 5,000,000 | (United States) Dustin Johnson (1) | 4Aces GC | | |
| 18 Sep | LIV Golf Invitational Chicago | United States | 20,000,000 | 5,000,000 | (Australia) Cameron Smith (1) | 4Aces GC | | |
| 9 Oct | LIV Golf Invitational Bangkok | Thailand | 20,000,000 | 5,000,000 | (Spain) Eugenio Chacarra (1) | Fireballs GC (Note: Abraham Ancer, Eugenio Chacarra, Sergio García and Carlos Ortiz) | MENA | |
| 16 Oct | LIV Golf Invitational Jeddah | Saudi Arabia | 20,000,000 | 5,000,000 | (United States) Brooks Koepka (1) | Smash GC (Note: Brooks Koepka, Chase Koepka, Jason Kokrak and Peter Uihlein) | MENA | |
| 30 Oct | LIV Golf Invitational Miami | United States | n/a | 50,000,000 | n/a | 4Aces GC | | Team Championship |

== Points list ==
=== Individual points list ===
The individual points list was based on tournament results during the season, calculated using a points-based system.

| Position | Player | Points |
|---|---|---|
| 1 | (United States) Dustin Johnson | 135 |
| 2 | (South Africa) Branden Grace | 79 |
| 3 | (United States) Peter Uihlein | 79 |
| 4 | (United States) Patrick Reed | 79 |
| 5 | (South Africa) Charl Schwartzel | 66 |

=== Team points list ===
The team points list was based on tournament results during the season, calculated using a points-based system.

| Position | Team | Points | TC finish |
|---|---|---|---|
| 1 | 4Aces GC | 152 | 1st |
| 2 | Crushers GC | 96 | T5 |
| 3 | Fireballs GC | 93 | T5 |
| 4 | Stinger GC | 72 | 4th |
| 5 | Smash GC | 62 | 3rd |

== Money list ==
The money list was based on prize money won during the season, calculated in U.S. dollars.

| Position | Player | Prize money ($) | | | |
| Position | Player | Individual | Team | Bonus | Total |
|---|---|---|---|---|---|
| 1 | (United States) Dustin Johnson | 10,575,267 | 7,062,500 | 18,000,000 | 35,637,767 |
| 2 | (South Africa) Branden Grace | 6,509,666 | 2,125,000 | 8,000,000 | 16,634,666 |
| 3 | (United States) Peter Uihlein | 5,814,786 | 3,000,000 | 4,000,000 | 12,814,786 |
| 4 | (United States) Patrick Reed | 5,148,214 | 7,062,500 | | 12,210,714 |
| 5 | (United States) Talor Gooch | 3,312,001 | 7,062,500 | | 10,374,501 |
