= James Piot =

American professional golfer (born 1998)

Personal information
- Nationality: United States
- Born: October 14, 1998 (age 28) Farmington Hills, Michigan, U.S.
- Height: 5 ft 9 in (175 cm)
- Weight: 153 lb (69 kg)

Career
- Sport: Golf
- College: Michigan State
- Turned professional: 2022
- Current tours: Asian Tour; PGA Tour Americas
- Former tour: LIV Golf

Best results in major championships
- Masters Tournament: CUT: 2022
- PGA Championship: DNP
- U.S. Open: CUT: 2022
- The Open Championship: DNP

James Piot (born October 14, 1998) is an American professional golfer from Canton, Michigan. In 2021, he won the U.S. Amateur.

== Amateur career ==
Piot was born in Farmington Hills, Michigan. In high school, he led Detroit Catholic Central to three consecutive state championships and won the Michigan junior amateur championship in 2015.

Piot enrolled at Michigan State in 2017, majoring in finance. He earned Big Ten Freshman of the Year honors in 2018. As a fifth-year senior in 2021, he was named an All-Big Ten First Team selection, an All-American Honorable Mention, and set a school record for lowest scoring average.

At the 2020 U.S. Amateur, Piot was the No. 2 seed in stroke-play before losing in the second round. He advanced to the final in 2021 at Oakmont Country Club, winning four consecutive holes on the back-nine to defeat Austin Greaser of North Carolina, 2 and 1. Piot became the first U.S. Amateur champion from Michigan.

== Professional career ==
Piot turned professional in May 2022.

In May 2022, Piot was announced as one of the participants for the inaugural LIV Golf event to be played June 9–11 at Centurion Club in London, England.

Piot continued with LIV Golf in 2023, appearing in all 14 events. His season high finish of T18 came at LIV Golf Greenbrier. After finishing 47th in 2023 LIV Golf League standings, Piot was relegated.

In 2024, Piot played in a handful of Asian Tour events, as well as various mini-tour events in the United States.

== Personal life ==
Piot is a close friend of professional football player Bryce Baringer, who was also his roommate at Michigan State.

== Amateur wins ==
- 2019 Island Resort Intercollegiate, Inverness Intercollegiate
- 2021 Hoosier Collegiate Invite, Golf Association of Michigan Championship, U.S. Amateur, Island Resort Intercollegiate
- 2022 Georgia Cup

== Results in major championships ==
Tournament	2022
Masters Tournament	CUT
PGA Championship	
U.S. Open	CUT
The Open Championship	

Did not play

CUT = missed the half-way cut

== U.S. national team appearances ==
- Spirit International Amateur: 2021 (winners)
