= David Puig =

Spanish professional golfer (born 2001)

Personal information
- Full name: David Puig Currius
- Nationality: Spain
- Born: 7 December 2001 (age 24) La Garriga, Spain
- Height: 6 ft 2 in (188 cm)
- Weight: 185 lb (84 kg)

Career
- Sport: Golf
- College: Arizona State University
- Turned professional: 2022
- Current tours: Asian Tour; LIV Golf; European Tour
- Professional wins: 3
- Highest ranking: 56 (7 June 2026) (as of 25 October 2026)

Number of wins by tour
- European Tour: 1
- Asian Tour: 2
- PGA Tour of Australasia: 1

Best results in major championships
- Masters Tournament: DNP
- PGA Championship: T18: 2026
- U.S. Open: T39: 2023
- The Open Championship: CUT: 2024, 2026

Achievements and awards
- Catalan Player of the Year: 2021
- LIV Golf League Breakout Star of the Year: 2025

David Puig Currius (Catalan pronunciation: [ˈpuːʒ]; born 7 December 2001) is a Spanish professional golfer who plays on the European Tour and the LIV Golf League. He cut short his college career at Arizona State University to join LIV Golf in 2022 but completed his last year online in 2023, which he shared in an Instagram post.

== Amateur career ==
Puig had a successful junior career and played for Spain in the Junior Golf World Cup in Japan, where he won silver in 2018 and bronze in 2019. He represented Europe in the 2018 Junior Ryder Cup. Puig finished third at the 2021 European Amateur, behind Christoffer Bring and Ludvig Åberg.

In 2019, Puig enrolled at Arizona State University and started playing college golf with the Arizona State Sun Devils men's golf team. Playing in just his fifth collegiate stroke play tournament, he won the 2021 Southwestern Invitational by a record nine-strokes, and then defended his title in 2022.

Puig also played in the Arnold Palmer Cup in 2020 and 2021, finishing both events with an individual result of 3–1. He was awarded Catalan Player of the Year in 2021 by the Catalan Association of Golf Journalists.

In 2022, Puig's Sun Devils team advanced to the final match at the NCAA Championship. He was invited to the inaugural tournament of the LIV Golf Invitational Series at Centurion Club, along with fellow amateur Ratchanon Chantananuwat.

== Professional career ==
Puig turned professional in September 2022. He joined LIV Golf, making his first appearance as a professional in the LIV Golf Invitational Chicago, having previously played in two events as an amateur. He also joined the Asian Tour. In his first event on the tour, the inaugural International Series Morocco at Royal Golf Dar Es Salam, he held the third round lead before ultimately finishing solo third two strokes behind Jazz Janewattananond.

Puig became a member of the Torque GC team for the 2023 LIV Golf League, alongside Joaquín Niemann, Sebastián Muñoz, and Mito Pereira. He was the youngest player on the 2023 LIV Golf roster. Torque won the team events in Orlando, Washington, Andalusia and Greenbrier.

In October 2023, he recorded his first win as a professional, at the International Series Singapore tournament on the Asian Tour, where he led wire-to-wire and won by five strokes. Puig won his second Asian Tour title in February 2024, at the IRS Prima Malaysian Open. He shot 62-62 in the final two rounds to finish two strokes ahead of runner-up Jeunghun Wang. The win earned Puig an exemption into the 2024 Open Championship. The following month, Puig shot a final-round 60 to tie for first at the International Series Macau. He lost in a playoff to John Catlin.

In November 2025, prior to the BMW Australian PGA Championship, Puig committed himself to full membership for the 2026 European Tour season. He also retained his LIV Golf contract for 2026. He shot a score of 266 (18 under par) to win the Australian PGA Championship, becoming the first Spaniard to claim the title since Seve Ballesteros in 1981. This was Puig's maiden European Tour victory and it came in his 15th start on the tour.

== Amateur wins ==
- 2016 Campeonato de Catalunya U18
- 2017 Mediterranean Championship, Copa Nacional Puerta de Hierro
- 2018 Campeonato de Espana U18, Campeonato de Catalunya Absoluto, Campeonato Internacional de Espana U18
- 2019 Campeonato de Barcelona, Campeonato de Catalunya U18, Campeonato Abierto de Madrid
- 2021 Southwestern Invitational, The Amer Ari Invitational
- 2022 Southwestern Invitational

== Professional wins (3) ==
=== European Tour wins (1) ===
No.	Date	Tournament	Winning score	Margin of victory	Runner-up
1	30 Nov 2025 (2026 season)	BMW Australian PGA Championship^{1}	−18 (68-67-65-66=266)	2 strokes	(China) Ding Wenyi

^{1}Co-sanctioned by the PGA Tour of Australasia

=== Asian Tour wins (2) ===
Legend
International Series (1)
Other Asian Tour (1)

No.	Date	Tournament	Winning score	Margin of victory	Runner-up
1	8 Oct 2023	International Series Singapore	−19 (64-66-66-73=269)	5 strokes	(South Korea) Eom Jae-woong
2	18 Feb 2024	IRS Prima Malaysian Open	−23 (66-71-62-62=261)	2 strokes	(South Korea) Wang Jeung-hun

Asian Tour playoff record (0–1)

No.	Year	Tournament	Opponent	Result
1	2024	International Series Macau	(United States) John Catlin	Lost to birdie on second extra hole

== Results in major championships ==
Tournament	2023	2024	2025	2026
Masters Tournament				
PGA Championship		CUT	T60	T18
U.S. Open	T39	55		CUT
The Open Championship		CUT		CUT

Did not play

CUT = missed the half-way cut
"T" = tied

== Team appearances ==
Amateur

- Junior Ryder Cup (representing the Continent of Europe): 2018
- Jacques Léglise Trophy (representing Continental Europe): 2018, 2019 (winners)
- European Boys' Team Championship (representing Spain): 2018 (winners), 2019
- European Amateur Team Championship (representing Spain): 2021, 2022 (winners)
- Arnold Palmer Cup (representing Europe): 2020, 2021
- Summer Youth Olympics Mixed team event (representing Spain): 2018
- Junior Golf World Cup (representing Spain): 2018, 2019
- Eisenhower Trophy (representing Spain): 2022
