= Dean Burmester =

South African professional golfer (born 1989)

Personal information
- Nicknames: Mean Dean, Burmy
- Nationality: South Africa
- Born: 2 June 1989 (age 37) Mutare, Zimbabwe
- Height: 5 ft 11 in (1.80 m)
- Weight: 167 lb (76 kg; 11.9 st)
- Spouse: Mel
- Children: 2

Career
- Sport: Golf
- Turned professional: 2010
- Current tours: LIV Golf; Sunshine Tour
- Former tours: PGA Tour; European Tour; Challenge Tour; Big Easy Tour
- Professional wins: 14
- Highest ranking: 55 (18 December 2022) (as of 25 October 2026)

Number of wins by tour
- European Tour: 4
- Sunshine Tour: 11
- LIV Golf: 2

Best results in major championships
- Masters Tournament: DNP
- PGA Championship: T12: 2024
- U.S. Open: T56: 2018
- The Open Championship: T11: 2022

Achievements and awards
- Sunshine Tour Players' Player of the Year: 2015

Dean Burmester (born 2 June 1989) is a South African professional golfer who plays in the LIV Golf League, as well as having status on the European Tour and Sunshine Tour. He formerly played on the PGA Tour.

== Early life ==
Burmester was born in Mutare, Zimbabwe but represents South Africa in golf.

His father, Mark Burmester, played international cricket for Zimbabwe while his mother Michelle holds (as of 2022) the women's course record at Royal Harare Golf Club, his home course. His cousin, Ryan, is a South African Spearfishing Champion having represented KZN and South Africa at CMAS World and EuroAfrica Zone Championship.

== Professional career ==
Burmester's first notable win came at the 2015 Golden Pilsener Zimbabwe Open. He also won the 2017 Tshwane Open which was a co-sanctioned Sunshine Tour and European Tour event.

In May 2021, Burmester claimed his second European Tour victory at the Tenerife Open. He shot a final round 62 to beat Nicolai von Dellingshausen by five shots. In November later that year, Burmester won the PGA Championship on the Sunshine Tour, claiming his eighth victory on the tour.

In August 2022, Burmester finished in fourth place at the Albertsons Boise Open on the Korn Ferry Tour. The following week he finished T46 at the Nationwide Children's Hospital Championship. These results secured his place within the Top 25 of the Korn Ferry Tour Finals; earning Burmester a PGA Tour card for the 2022–23 season.

In February 2023, Burmester joined LIV Golf.

In November 2023, Burmester won the Joburg Open, claiming his third European Tour and ninth Sunshine Tour victory. The following week, he claimed further success, winning the Investec South African Open Championship.

In April 2024, Burmester claimed his first title on the LIV Golf League by beating Sergio García on the second play-off hole at the LIV Golf Miami event.

== Professional wins (14) ==
=== European Tour wins (4) ===
No.	Date	Tournament	Winning score	Margin of victory	Runner(s)-up
1	5 Mar 2017	Tshwane Open^{1}	−18 (68-68-65-65=266)	3 strokes	(Spain) Jorge Campillo, (Finland) Mikko Korhonen
2	2 May 2021	Tenerife Open	−25 (63-68-66-62=259)	5 strokes	(Germany) Nicolai von Dellingshausen
3	26 Nov 2023 (2024 season)	Joburg Open^{1}	−18 (68-62-68-64=262)	3 strokes	(South Africa) Darren Fichardt
4	3 Dec 2023 (2024 season)	Investec South African Open Championship^{1}	−11 (70-74-65-68=277)	3 strokes	(Italy) Renato Paratore, (Sweden) Jesper Svensson, (South Africa) Ryan van Velzen

^{1}Co-sanctioned by the Sunshine Tour

=== Sunshine Tour wins (11) ===
No.	Date	Tournament	Winning score	Margin of victory	Runner(s)-up
1	15 Jun 2013	Polokwane Classic	−12 (69-67-68=204)	4 strokes	(South Africa) Merrick Bremner, (South Africa) Justin Harding
2	4 Jul 2014	Sun City Challenge	−10 (68-67-71=206)	1 stroke	(South Africa) Haydn Porteous
3	12 Apr 2015	Golden Pilsener Zimbabwe Open	−16 (67-66-72-67=272)	1 stroke	(Brazil) Adilson da Silva
4	24 May 2015	Lombard Insurance Classic	−23 (63-65-65=193)	5 strokes	(South Africa) Keith Horne, (South Africa) Peter Karmis
5	18 Sep 2015	Sun Windmill Challenge	−18 (69-64-65=198)	4 strokes	(South Africa) Callum Mowat
6	24 Oct 2015	Vodacom Origins of Golf at Koro Creek	−19 (64-66-67=197)	5 strokes	(South Africa) Vaughn Groenewald
7	5 Mar 2017	Tshwane Open^{1}	−18 (68-68-65-65=266)	3 strokes	(Spain) Jorge Campillo, (Finland) Mikko Korhonen
8	7 Nov 2021	PGA Championship	−17 (69-71-66-65=271)	2 strokes	(South Africa) Pieter Moolman
9	26 Nov 2023	Joburg Open^{1}	−18 (68-62-68-64=262)	3 strokes	(South Africa) Darren Fichardt
10	3 Dec 2023	Investec South African Open Championship^{1}	−11 (70-74-65-68=277)	3 strokes	(Italy) Renato Paratore, (Sweden) Jesper Svensson, (South Africa) Ryan van Velzen
11	17 Nov 2024	Vodacom Origins of Golf Final (2)	−28 (67-64-63-66=260)	7 strokes	(South Africa) Jean Hugo

^{1}Co-sanctioned by the European Tour

Sunshine Tour playoff record (0–1)

No.	Year	Tournament	Opponent	Result
1	2016	Eye of Africa PGA Championship	(South Africa) Jaco van Zyl	Lost to par on first extra hole

=== LIV Golf League wins (2) ===
No.	Date	Tournament	Winning score	Margin of victory	Runner(s)-up
1	7 Apr 2024	LIV Golf Miami	−11 (68-69-68=205)	Playoff	(Spain) Sergio García
2	10 Aug 2025	LIV Golf Chicago	−9 (68-65-71=204)	Playoff	(Spain) Joséle Ballester, (Spain) Jon Rahm

LIV Golf League playoff record (2–0)

No.	Year	Tournament	Opponent(s)	Result
1	2024	LIV Golf Miami	(Spain) Sergio García	Won with par on second extra hole
2	2025	LIV Golf Chicago	(Spain) Joséle Ballester, (Spain) Jon Rahm	Won with birdie on first extra hole

== Results in major championships ==
Tournament	2018	2019	2020	2021	2022	2023	2024	2025
Masters Tournament								
PGA Championship				T59	CUT	54	T12	CUT
U.S. Open	T56	CUT					69	
The Open Championship			NT	T40	T11		T19	T61

Did not play

CUT = missed the half-way cut
"T" = tied
NT = no tournament due to COVID-19 pandemic

== Results in World Golf Championships ==
Tournament	2016	2017	2018
Championship			T30
Match Play			
Invitational			
Champions	T35		

Did not play

"T" = Tied

== See also ==
- 2022 Korn Ferry Tour Finals graduates
