= Centurion Club =

Golf club in Hertfordshire, England

- Interactive map of Centurion Club
- 51°44′28″N 0°24′23″W

Club information
- Location: Hemel Hempstead, United Kingdom
- Established: 2013
- Tota holes: 18
- Website: centurionclub.co.uk
- Designed by: Simon Gidman

The Centurion Club is a golf club in Hemel Hempstead in Hertfordshire.

The club opened in 2013. It has hosted the GolfSixes series in 2017 and 2018 and the Aramco Team Series. The club held the first event of the first LIV Golf Invitational Series in June 2022.

The course was designed by Simon Gidman.
