= Talor Gooch =

American professional golfer (born 1991)

Personal information
- Full name: Talor Keith Gooch
- Nationality: United States
- Born: November 14, 1991 (age 34) Midwest City, Oklahoma, U.S.
- Height: 6 ft 0 in (1.83 m)
- Weight: 200 lb (91 kg; 14 st)
- Spouse: Ally Gooch (m. 2019)

Career
- Sport: Golf
- College: Oklahoma State University
- Turned professional: 2014
- Current tour: LIV Golf
- Former tours: PGA Tour; Web.com Tour; PGA Tour Canada
- Professional wins: 6
- Highest ranking: 31 (January 16, 2022) (as of October 25, 2026)

Number of wins by tour
- PGA Tour: 1
- Korn Ferry Tour: 1
- LIV Golf: 4

Best results in major championships
- Masters Tournament: T14: 2022
- PGA Championship: T20: 2022
- U.S. Open: 66th: 2017
- The Open Championship: T33: 2021

Achievements and awards
- LIV Golf League individual points list winner: 2023
- LIV Golf League money list winner: 2023

Talor Keith Gooch (born November 14, 1991) is an American professional golfer.

== Early life and amateur career ==
Gooch was born in Midwest City, Oklahoma. He played college golf at Oklahoma State University. He was already drawing notice for his talent as a six-year-old. His father, Ron Gooch, played minor league professional baseball in the Texas Rangers organization.

== Professional career ==
Gooch played on the PGA Tour Canada in 2015 and 2016. His best finish was second at the 2015 Syncrude Boreal Open. In December 2016, he tied for 23rd place in the Web.com Tour qualifying tournament to earn a place on the Web.com Tour in 2017. In August 2017, he won the News Sentinel Open. He finished sixth on the regular season money list to earn his PGA Tour card.

On the 2017–18 PGA Tour, Gooch made 12 cuts in 27 events with a best finish of T13 at the Wells Fargo Championship. He finished 139th on the FedEx Cup points list to retain conditional status for the following season. He had two top-5 finishes early in the 2018–19 season and finished 101st on the FedEx Cup points list.

In November 2021, Gooch won his first PGA Tour event at the RSM Classic in Sea Island, Georgia. Gooch shot a final round 6-under-par 64 to win by three strokes.

Gooch joined the LIV Golf Invitational Series in May 2022. Gooch placed 9th in the LIV Golf London at Centurion Club, earning $580,000. Gooch was also a member of the 4Aces GC team at Portland. In an interview after the event, Gooch compared the event to Ryder Cup and Presidents Cup events.

In April 2023, Gooch won his first LIV event by winning the LIV Golf Adelaide event in Australia, following it one week later with a victory at the LIV event in Singapore. In July 2023, Gooch won his third LIV event, LIV Golf Andalucía which was played at Valderrama in Spain. Following the end of the 2023 LIV Golf League's individual season, Gooch won an $18 million bonus for winning the season long points race.

Since 2024, Gooch has been the owner of the Oklahoma Wildcatters, one of ten bull riding teams in the Professional Bull Riders (PBR) Team Series, which runs every summer and autumn in the United States.

== Controversies ==
Since joining LIV Golf in 2022, Gooch became involved in several off-course controversies in the media regarding comments about LIV's stature in the professional game. In July 2022, speaking after the LIV Golf Invitational Portland event; Gooch compared the atmosphere and crowds at the event as similar to that of playing in a Ryder Cup or Presidents Cup, despite having not played in one himself. In February 2024, Gooch commented on the prospect of Rory McIlroy winning the 2024 Masters Tournament; suggesting that if he were to go and win, it would come with an "asterisk" since some of the LIV Golf roster would not be playing in the tournament. McIlroy responded to this by suggesting that Gooch be more like Joaquín Niemann, another LIV player who had also competed in non-LIV events and received a special invitation to play in the 2024 Masters.

== Amateur wins ==
- 2012 Oklahoma Stroke Play

== Professional wins (6) ==
=== PGA Tour wins (1) ===
No.	Date	Tournament	Winning score	To par	Margin of victory	Runner-up
1	Nov 21, 2021	RSM Classic	64-65-67-64=260	−22	3 strokes	(Canada) Mackenzie Hughes

=== Web.com Tour wins (1) ===
No.	Date	Tournament	Winning score	To par	Margin of victory	Runner-up
1	Aug 20, 2017	News Sentinel Open	66-67-68-65=266	−18	1 stroke	(United States) Jonathan Hodge

=== LIV Golf League wins (4) ===
No.	Date	Tournament	Winning score	To par	Margin of victory	Runner-up
1	Apr 23, 2023	LIV Golf Adelaide^{1}	62-62-73=197	−19	3 strokes	(India) Anirban Lahiri
2	Apr 30, 2023	LIV Golf Singapore^{1}	64-65-67=196	−17	Playoff	(Spain) Sergio García
3	Jul 2, 2023	LIV Golf Andalucía^{1}	69-65-67=201	−12	1 stroke	(United States) Bryson DeChambeau
4	Jul 13, 2025	LIV Golf Andalucía (2)	69-66-70=205	−8	1 stroke	(Spain) Jon Rahm

^{1}Co-sanctioned by the MENA Tour

LIV Golf League playoff record (1–2)

No.	Year	Tournament	Opponent	Result
1	2023	LIV Golf Singapore	(Spain) Sergio García	Won with birdie on first extra hole
2	2023	LIV Golf Jeddah	(United States) Brooks Koepka	Lost to birdie on second extra hole
3	2026	LIV Golf Korea	(Chile) Joaquín Niemann	Lost to birdie on first extra hole

== Results in major championships ==
Results not in chronological order in 2020.

Tournament	2017	2018
Masters Tournament		
U.S. Open	66	
The Open Championship		
PGA Championship		

Tournament	2019	2020	2021	2022	2023	2024
Masters Tournament				T14	T34	
PGA Championship		CUT	T44	T20	CUT	T60
U.S. Open				CUT		
The Open Championship		NT	T33	T34	CUT	

Did not play

CUT = missed the half-way cut
"T" = tied
NT = No tournament due to COVID-19 pandemic

== Results in The Players Championship ==
Tournament	2019	2020	2021	2022
The Players Championship	CUT	C	T5	CUT

Top 10

CUT = missed the halfway cut
"T" indicates a tie for a place
C = Canceled after the first round due to the COVID-19 pandemic

== Results in World Golf Championships ==
Tournament	2021	2022
Championship		
Match Play	T56	T18
Invitational		
Champions	NT^{1}	NT^{1}

^{1}Canceled due to COVID-19 pandemic

Did not play

"T" = Tied
NT = No tournament
Note that the Championship and Invitational were discontinued from 2022.

== See also ==
- 2017 Web.com Tour Finals graduates
