= Matthew Wolff =

American professional golfer (born 1999)

Personal information
- Full name: Matthew Brandyn Wolff
- Nationality: United States
- Born: April 14, 1999 (age 27) Simi Valley, California, U.S.
- Height: 6 ft 0 in (1.83 m)

Career
- Sport: Golf
- College: Oklahoma State University
- Turned professional: 2019
- Current tour: LIV Golf
- Former tour: PGA Tour
- Professional wins: 1
- Highest ranking: 12 (October 11, 2020) (as of October 25, 2026)

Number of wins by tour
- PGA Tour: 1

Best results in major championships
- Masters Tournament: CUT: 2020, 2022
- PGA Championship: T4: 2020
- U.S. Open: 2nd: 2020
- The Open Championship: DNP

Achievements and awards
- Haskins Award: 2019

Matthew Brandyn Wolff (born April 14, 1999) is an American professional golfer. He was an NCAA All-American at Oklahoma State University, and won the 2019 NCAA Division I individual championship. Wolff picked up his first win on the PGA Tour at the 2019 3M Open. He joined LIV Golf in 2022.

== Early life and amateur career ==
Wolff was born on April 14, 1999, in Simi Valley, California, to Bill and Shari Wolff. He grew up in a Jewish family, but converted to Christianity during his time in college. He stated in 2019: "To put my identity in Christ and know that there's a lot more to me than just a golfer, it took the pressure away from golf". Wolff was raised in Agoura Hills, California, started playing junior golf at the Lake Lindero Country Club's Lindero Kids Summer Sports Camp and attended Westlake High School. He finished runner-up at the 2017 U.S. Junior Amateur Golf Championship. After initially committing to play college golf for the University of Southern California, Wolff withdrew his commitment to attend Oklahoma State. In his first year, he earned four runners-up, first-team All-American honors, and the Phil Mickelson Award as the nation's top freshman. He also made the putt to clinch the 2018 NCAA Division I Championship for Oklahoma State. While attending Oklahoma State University, Wolff was also a part of the Phi Gamma Delta fraternity.

Wolff began his sophomore season with back-to-back stroke play titles at the Carmel Cup and the OFCC Fighting Illini Invitational, which he followed up by sharing medalist honors at the Royal Oaks Intercollegiate. The three consecutive wins brought Wolff to the top of the college rankings. He made his PGA Tour debut at the 2019 Waste Management Phoenix Open after receiving a sponsor's exemption.

In addition to his results, Wolff's unorthodox golf swing has drawn attention. To get more rotation, he employs a left leg kick that he picked up from playing baseball, and uses the ground to create power.

== Professional career ==
Wolff turned professional in June 2019 and made his professional debut at the Travelers Championship.

On July 7, 2019, Wolff earned his first PGA Tour victory at the 3M Open at TPC Twin Cities in Blaine, Minnesota, where he returned a six-under par 65 in the final round to edge out Collin Morikawa and Bryson DeChambeau by one stroke at 21-under par overall. The tournament went to the final green, as DeChambeau, playing one group ahead of Morikawa and Wolff, made an eagle on the par-5 18th hole to leapfrog them both and take a 1-stroke lead. Wolff then hit his approach onto the edge of the green, 26 feet from the hole; he made the putt for eagle to retake the lead, and when Morikawa failed to make his putt to tie, the victory belonged to Wolff. The victory gave Wolff a two-year PGA Tour exemption, in addition to $1.152 million in prize money. Wolff was the first player since Billy Hurley III in 2016 to win after receiving a sponsor exemption. He was also only the third player to win an NCAA title and PGA Tour event in the same calendar year, joining Tiger Woods and Ben Crenshaw.

In August 2020, Wolff finished in a tie for fourth place at the PGA Championship, his first major championship appearance, after a final-round 65 (five-under par). Six weeks later, in September, he led the U.S. Open at Winged Foot by two strokes heading into the final day after returning a third-round score of 65 (five-under par), the joint lowest round of the tournament. A final round of 75 (five-over par) saw him finish as runner-up, six strokes behind winner Bryson DeChambeau. His second top-five finish from his first two major championships earned him $1,350,000.

In June 2022, Wolff joined LIV Golf, and was subsequently suspended by the PGA Tour after playing in his first event. He has recorded three top-10s since his LIV Golf debut, most notably finishing tied for second in Bedminster, two shots behind winner Henrik Stenson.

== Amateur wins ==
- 2018 The Carmel Cup, OFCC Fighting Illini Invite, Royal Oaks Intercollegiate
- 2019 The Amer Ari Invitational, Valspar Collegiate, NCAA Division I individual championship

== Professional wins (1) ==
=== PGA Tour wins (1) ===
No.	Date	Tournament	Winning score	To par	Margin of victory	Runners-up
1	Jul 7, 2019	3M Open	69-67-62-65=263	−21	1 stroke	(United States) Bryson DeChambeau, (United States) Collin Morikawa

PGA Tour playoff record (0–1)

No.	Year	Tournament	Opponents	Result
1	2020	Shriners Hospitals for Children Open	(United States) Austin Cook, (Scotland) Martin Laird	Laird won with birdie on second extra hole

== Results in major championships ==
Results not in chronological order in 2020.

Tournament	2020	2021	2022
Masters Tournament	CUT	DQ	CUT
PGA Championship	T4		CUT
U.S. Open	2	T15	
The Open Championship	NT		

Top 10
Did not play

DQ = disqualified
CUT = missed the half-way cut
"T" = tied
NT = No tournament due to COVID-19 pandemic

== Results in The Players Championship ==
Tournament	2022
The Players Championship	CUT

CUT = missed the halfway cut

== Results in World Golf Championships ==
Tournament	2019	2020	2021	2022
Championship			WD	
Match Play		NT^{1}	T28	T60
Invitational	T24	T49	T17	
Champions		NT^{1}	NT^{1}	NT^{1}

^{1}Cancelled due to COVID-19 pandemic

Did not play

NT = No tournament
"T" = Tied
WD = withdrew
Note that the Championship and Invitational were discontinued from 2022.

== U.S. national team appearances ==
Amateur

- Palmer Cup: 2018 (winners)
