= Sebastián Muñoz =

Colombian professional golfer (born 1993)

Personal information
- Full name: Juan Sebastián Muñoz Amaya
- Nationality: Colombia
- Born: 4 January 1993 (age 33) Bogotá, Colombia
- Height: 6 ft 0 in (1.83 m)
- Weight: 179 lb (81 kg; 12.8 st)

Career
- Sport: Golf
- College: University of North Texas
- Turned professional: 2015
- Current tour: LIV Golf
- Former tours: PGA Tour; European Tour; Web.com Tour
- Professional wins: 5
- Highest ranking: 49 (19 June 2022) (as of 25 October 2026)

Number of wins by tour
- PGA Tour: 1
- Korn Ferry Tour: 1
- LIV Golf: 1
- Other: 2

Best results in major championships
- Masters Tournament: T19: 2020
- PGA Championship: T55: 2022
- U.S. Open: T14: 2022
- The Open Championship: T62: 2022
Medal record
Representing Colombia
Men's golf
Pan American Games
Silver medal – second place	2023 Santiago	Individual

Juan Sebastián Muñoz Amaya (born 4 January 1993) is a Colombian professional golfer. He played predominantly on the PGA Tour, where he had one tournament victory, the Sanderson Farms Championship in 2019, prior to joining LIV Golf in 2023.

== Career ==
Muñoz played college golf at the University of North Texas where he won two tournaments his senior year including the Conference USA Championship.

Muñoz turned professional in 2015 and played on the PGA Tour Latinoamérica's Developmental Series where he won two tournaments. His finish on the Series earned him exempt status on the first half of the 2016 PGA Tour Latinoamérica season. However, in February 2016, playing on a sponsor invitation, Muñoz won the Club Colombia Championship on the Web.com Tour. This victory, coming in his hometown of Bogotá, earned him a Web.com Tour card and was the first win by a Colombian golfer on the Web.com Tour. He finished 22nd in the regular season money list, which earned him a PGA Tour card for the 2017 season.

Muñoz's best finish in 2017 was a T-3 in the Greenbrier Classic in July. He fired a "stunning" 61 in the 1st round to take a two shot lead. He followed with rounds of 67 and 68 to maintain the solo lead. He shot a disappointing 72 in the fourth round, however, to lose to Xander Schauffele. This was Muñoz's only top 10 of the year and he failed to maintain his PGA Tour card.

In 2018, Muñoz played well on the Web.com Tour, with two 2nd-place finishes and a 3rd-place finish, to end up 12th on the money list and earn a promotion to the PGA Tour again.

On 22 September 2019, Muñoz won his first PGA Tour tournament, winning the Sanderson Farms Championship in Jackson, Mississippi. Muñoz won in a playoff over Im Sung-jae.

In September 2022, Muñoz was selected for the International team in the 2022 Presidents Cup; he played three matches, winning two and tying the other.

Munoz joined LIV Golf in February 2023 ahead of its second season; as a result, he was suspended from the PGA Tour.

== Amateur wins ==
- 2010 Copa Joaquin y Tomas Samper Brush, Canadian International Junior Challenge
- 2012 Abierto de Golf Ciudad de Ibague, Abierto de Golf
- 2013 Torneo Aficionado Segunda Semana
- 2014 Abierto de Golf Ciudad de Ibague, Abierto de Golf Bucaramanga, Jim Rivers Intercollegiate
- 2015 Conference USA Championship

== Professional wins (5) ==
=== PGA Tour wins (1) ===
No.	Date	Tournament	Winning score	Margin of victory	Runner-up
1	22 Sep 2019	Sanderson Farms Championship	−18 (70-67-63-70=270)	Playoff	(South Korea) Im Sung-jae

PGA Tour playoff record (1–0)

No.	Year	Tournament	Opponent	Result
1	2019	Sanderson Farms Championship	(South Korea) Im Sung-jae	Won with par on first extra hole

=== Web.com Tour wins (1) ===
No.	Date	Tournament	Winning score	Margin of victory	Runners-up
1	7 Feb 2016	Club Colombia Championship	−12 (69-66-66-71=272)	1 stroke	(United States) Matt Atkins, (United States) Richy Werenski

=== Colombian Tour wins (2) ===
No.	Date	Tournament	Winning score	Margin of victory	Runner-up
1	12 Jul 2015	Abierto de Buracamanga	−18 (71-65-66-68=270)	9 strokes	(Colombia) Santiago Rivas
2	23 Aug 2015	Abierto de Club Campestre Medellín	−17 (70-69-64-68=271)	1 stroke	(Colombia) Marcelo Rozo

=== LIV Golf League wins (1) ===
No.	Date	Tournament	Winning score	Margin of victory	Runner-up
1	17 Aug 2025	LIV Golf Indianapolis	−22 (59-67-65=191)	Playoff	(Spain) Jon Rahm

LIV Golf League playoff record (1–0)

No.	Year	Tournament	Opponent	Result
1	2025	LIV Golf Indianapolis	(Spain) Jon Rahm	Won with birdie on first extra hole

== Results in major championships ==
Results not in chronological order in 2020.

Tournament	2017	2018
Masters Tournament		
U.S. Open		CUT
The Open Championship	CUT	
PGA Championship		

Tournament	2019	2020	2021	2022	2023
Masters Tournament		T19	T40		
PGA Championship		CUT	CUT	T55	
U.S. Open		T59	CUT	T14	T49
The Open Championship		NT	CUT	T62	

Did not play

CUT = missed the half-way cut
"T" = tied
NT = No tournament due to COVID-19 pandemic

=== Summary ===
Tournament	Wins	2nd	3rd	Top-5	Top-10	Top-25	Events	Cuts made
Masters Tournament	0	0	0	0	0	1	2	2
PGA Championship	0	0	0	0	0	0	3	1
U.S. Open	0	0	0	0	0	1	5	3
The Open Championship	0	0	0	0	0	0	3	1
Totals	0	0	0	0	0	2	13	7

- Most consecutive cuts made – 4 (2022 PGA – 2023 U.S. Open, current)
- Longest streak of top-10s – 0

== Results in The Players Championship ==
Tournament	2021	2022
The Players Championship	CUT	T33

CUT = missed the halfway cut
"T" indicates a tie for a place

== Results in World Golf Championships ==
Tournament	2020	2021	2022
Championship	T14	T22	
Match Play	NT^{1}	T61	T26
Invitational			
Champions	NT^{1}	NT^{1}	NT^{1}

^{1}Cancelled due to COVID-19 pandemic

Did not play

NT = No tournament
"T" = Tied
Note that the Championship and Invitational were discontinued from 2022.

== Team appearances ==
Professional

- Presidents Cup (representing the International team): 2022

== See also ==
- 2016 Web.com Tour Finals graduates
- 2018 Web.com Tour Finals graduates
- Lowest rounds of golf
