= Harold Varner III =

American professional golfer (born 1990)

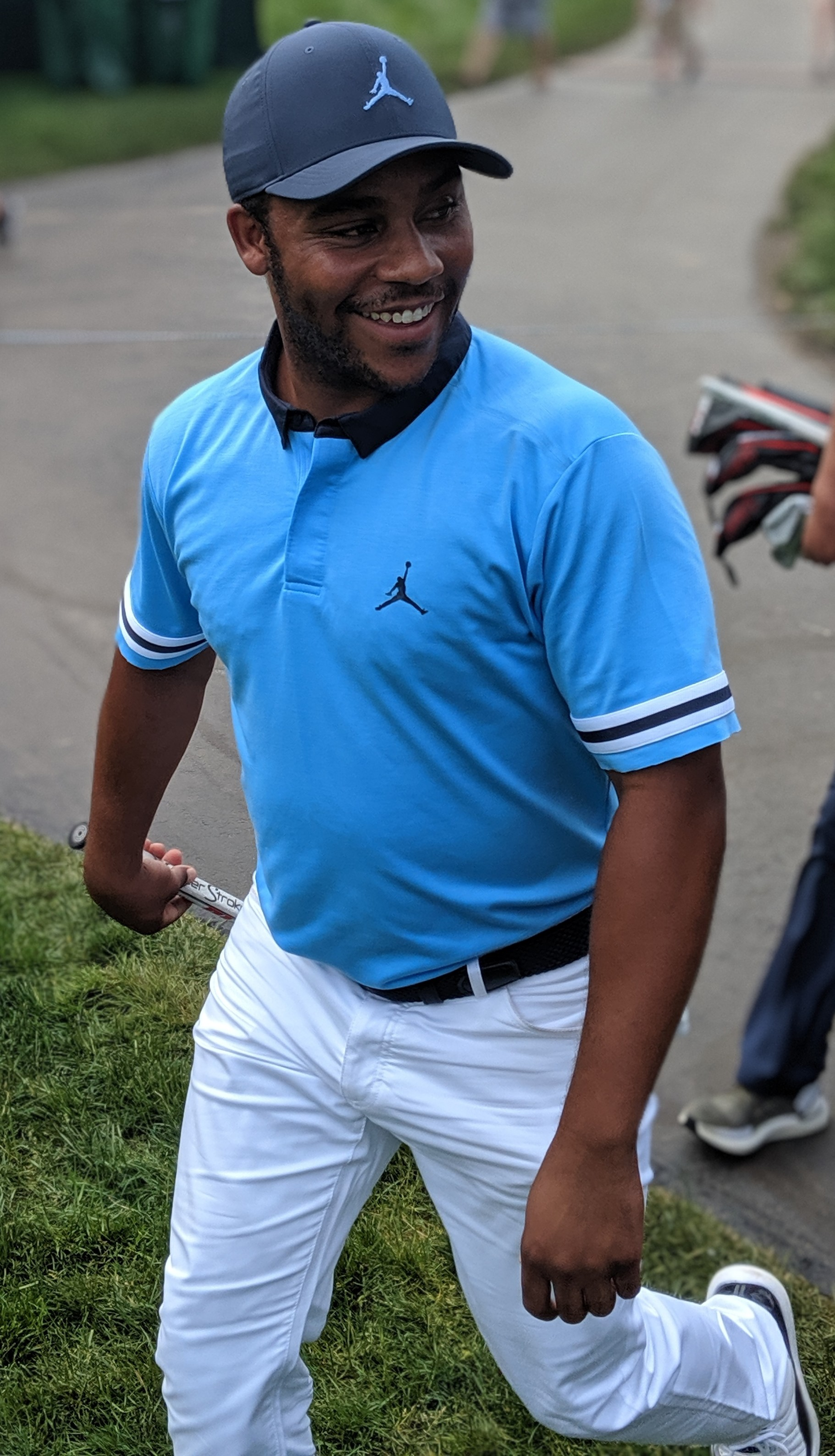

Personal information
- Full name: Harold William Varner III
- Nickname: HV3
- Nationality: United States
- Born: August 15, 1990 (age 36) Akron, Ohio, U.S.
- Height: 5 ft 8 in (1.73 m)
- Weight: 165 lb (75 kg; 11.8 st)

Career
- Sport: Golf
- College: East Carolina University
- Turned professional: 2012
- Current tours: Asian Tour; LIV Golf
- Former tours: PGA Tour; European Tour; Web.com Tour eGolf Professional Tour
- Professional wins: 3
- Highest ranking: 35 (June 12, 2022) (as of October 25, 2026)

Number of wins by tour
- European Tour: 1
- Asian Tour: 1
- PGA Tour of Australasia: 1
- LIV Golf: 1

Best results in major championships
- Masters Tournament: T23: 2022
- PGA Championship: T29: 2020, 2023
- U.S. Open: CUT: 2013, 2018, 2022
- The Open Championship: T28: 2022

Harold William Varner III (born August 15, 1990) is an American professional golfer who has played on the PGA Tour and currently plays in the LIV Golf League. He won the Australian PGA Championship in December 2016 and the PIF Saudi International in February 2022.

== Amateur career ==
Varner was born in Akron, Ohio, but raised in Gastonia, North Carolina where he played golf at Forestview High School. He played his collegiate golf at East Carolina University and was the first player in school history to be named Conference USA player of the year. He also competed in the 2010 U.S. Amateur at Chambers Bay in University Place, Washington.

== Professional career ==
Varner turned professional in 2012, missing the cut at the Chiquita Classic. Prior to playing on the Web.com Tour, he played on the eGolf Professional Tour and Florida Tour. He qualified for the 2013 U.S. Open, but missed the cut.

Varner started playing on the Web.com Tour in 2014, making 13 cuts in 21 tournaments with two top-10 finishes. His best finish was T-2 at the Rex Hospital Open. He finished 30th on the money list in his first full season. He also played in two PGA Tour events, the Northern Trust Open (T70) and Wells Fargo Championship (missed cut).

In 2015, he had five top-25 finishes and a runner-up finish at the Panama Claro Championship. He finished 25th on the Web.com Tour regular season money list, the last guaranteed spot, to earn a PGA Tour card for the 2015–16 season. Varner is the first African-American golfer to advance to the PGA Tour via the Web.com Tour.

In December 2016, Varner earned his first professional golf victory by winning the Australian PGA Championship, a tournament co-sanctioned by the PGA Tour of Australasia and the European Tour. He is only the second American to win the Australian PGA Championship and the first since Hale Irwin won it in 1978. He also became the third black man to win on the European Tour after Vincent Tshabalala of South Africa and Tiger Woods.

In May 2019, Varner was tied for second heading into the final round of the PGA Championship on Bethpage Black outside of New York City. He played in the final group with eventual champion Brooks Koepka but shot 81 to finish tied for 36th.

In April 2021, Varner recorded his best finish to date on the PGA Tour. A tied-second place at the RBC Heritage; four shots behind Stewart Cink.

In February 2022, Varner won the PIF Saudi International on the Asian Tour. He eagled the final hole with a 92-foot putt to beat Bubba Watson by one shot.

In April 2022, Varner held his first solo 54-hole PGA Tour lead at the RBC Heritage. He finished tied for third, one shot behind winner Jordan Spieth. He moved to a career high 36th in the world rankings. In May 2022 at the Charles Schwab Challenge, Varner was tied for the lead after the 11th hole in the final round. He finished the round 9 shots back of the eventual winner after closing at +10 over the final seven holes. In August 2022, it was announced that Varner had joined LIV Golf.

In May 2023, Varner won the LIV Golf Washington, D.C. tournament with a score of −12, one stroke better than Branden Grace.

== Personal life ==
In December 2023, Varner was arrested for driving while impaired. He registered a .16 BAC during a breathalyzer test, twice the legal driving limit.

Varner is a supporter of EFL Championship football club, Blackburn Rovers.

== Professional wins (3) ==
=== European Tour wins (1) ===
| No. | Date | Tournament | Winning score | Margin of victory | Runner-up |
|---|---|---|---|---|---|
| 1 | Dec 4, 2016 (2017 season) | Australian PGA Championship^{1} | −19 (65-72-67-65=269) | 2 strokes | (Australia) Andrew Dodt |

^{1}Co-sanctioned by the PGA Tour of Australasia

European Tour playoff record (0–1)

| No. | Year | Tournament | Opponents | Result |
|---|---|---|---|---|
| 1 | 2015 | Australian PGA Championship | (South Africa) Dylan Frittelli, (Australia) Nathan Holman | Holman won with par on first extra hole |

=== Asian Tour wins (1) ===
Legend
Flagship events (1)
Other Asian Tour (0)

| No. | Date | Tournament | Winning score | Margin of victory | Runner-up |
|---|---|---|---|---|---|
| 1 | Feb 6, 2022 | PIF Saudi International | −13 (64-66-68-69=267) | 1 stroke | (United States) Bubba Watson |

=== LIV Golf League wins (1) ===
| No. | Date | Tournament | Winning score | Margin of victory | Runner-up |
|---|---|---|---|---|---|
| 1 | May 28, 2023 | LIV Golf Washington, D.C.^{1} | −12 (64-72-68=204) | 1 stroke | (South Africa) Branden Grace |

^{1}Co-sanctioned by the MENA Tour

== Results in major championships ==
Results not in chronological order in 2020.

| Tournament | 2013 | 2014 | 2015 | 2016 | 2017 | 2018 |
|---|---|---|---|---|---|---|
| Masters Tournament | | | | | | |
| U.S. Open | CUT | | | | | CUT |
| The Open Championship | | | | T66 | | |
| PGA Championship | | | | CUT | | |

| Tournament | 2019 | 2020 | 2021 | 2022 | 2023 |
|---|---|---|---|---|---|
| Masters Tournament | | | | T23 | T29 |
| PGA Championship | T36 | T29 | T49 | T48 | T29 |
| U.S. Open | | | | CUT | |
| The Open Championship | | NT | CUT | T28 | |

Did not play

CUT = missed the half-way cut
"T" = tied
NT = No tournament due to COVID-19 pandemic

=== Summary ===
| Tournament | Wins | 2nd | 3rd | Top-5 | Top-10 | Top-25 | Events | Cuts made |
|---|---|---|---|---|---|---|---|---|
| Masters Tournament | 0 | 0 | 0 | 0 | 0 | 1 | 2 | 2 |
| PGA Championship | 0 | 0 | 0 | 0 | 0 | 0 | 6 | 5 |
| U.S. Open | 0 | 0 | 0 | 0 | 0 | 0 | 3 | 0 |
| The Open Championship | 0 | 0 | 0 | 0 | 0 | 0 | 3 | 2 |
| Totals | 0 | 0 | 0 | 0 | 0 | 1 | 14 | 9 |

- Most consecutive cuts made – 3 (2019 PGA – 2021 PGA)
- Longest streak of top-10s – 0

== Results in The Players Championship ==
| Tournament | 2016 | 2017 | 2018 | 2019 | 2020 | 2021 | 2022 |
|---|---|---|---|---|---|---|---|
| The Players Championship | T57 | T35 | T7 | CUT | C | T61 | T6 |

Top 10

CUT = missed the halfway cut
"T" indicates a tie for a place
C = Canceled after the first round due to the COVID-19 pandemic

== Results in World Golf Championships ==
| Tournament | 2017 | 2018 | 2019 | 2020 | 2021 | 2022 |
|---|---|---|---|---|---|---|
| Championship | | | | | | |
| Match Play | | | | NT^{1} | | T18 |
| Invitational | T50 | | | | | |
| Champions | | | | NT^{1} | NT^{1} | NT^{1} |

^{1}Cancelled due to COVID-19 pandemic

Did not play

"T" = Tied
NT = No tournament
Note that the Championship and Invitational were discontinued from 2022.

== See also ==
- 2015 Web.com Tour Finals graduates
