= Eugenio Chacarra =

Spanish professional golfer (born 2000)

Personal information
- Full name: Eugenio López-Chacarra Coto
- Nationality: Spain
- Born: 22 March 2000 (age 26) Madrid, Spain
- Height: 6 ft 2 in (188 cm)
- Weight: 185 lb (84 kg)

Career
- Sport: Golf
- College: Wake Forest University; Oklahoma State University
- Turned professional: 2022
- Current tours: PGA Tour; European Tour
- Former tour: LIV Golf
- Professional wins: 6
- Highest ranking: 34 (15 November 2026) (as of 15 November 2026)

Number of wins by tour
- European Tour: 4
- Asian Tour: 1
- LIV Golf: 1

Best results in major championships
- Masters Tournament: DNP
- PGA Championship: CUT: 2025
- U.S. Open: CUT: 2024
- The Open Championship: T46: 2026

Eugenio López-Chacarra Coto (born 22 March 2000) is a Spanish professional golfer who plays on the European Tour and PGA Tour.

== Early life ==
Chacarra was born in Madrid, Spain. His sister, Carolina, also played college golf in the United States, at Wake Forest University.

== Amateur career ==
Chacarra attended Oklahoma State University, where he studied Sports Management, Finance and Psychology. He was a first team All-American and reached a high of number two in the World Amateur Golf Ranking, before turning professional and joining LIV Golf in June 2022, reportedly on a three-year contract. Two months before then, he had announced that he would be returning for a fifth year at Oklahoma State, despite qualifying for the Korn Ferry Tour through the PGA Tour University rankings.

== Professional career ==
In October 2022, Chacarra gained his first professional victory, winning the LIV Golf Invitational Bangkok by three strokes from Patrick Reed; his Fireballs team also won team component. In August 2023, Chacarra won the St Andrews Bay Championship played at Fairmont St Andrews on the Asian Tour as part of the International Series. He defeated Matt Jones in a 10-hole sudden-death playoff.

Chacarra left LIV Golf after three seasons, and earned full European Tour status when he won the Hero Indian Open on a sponsor's invite in March 2025.

In 2026, Chacarra won back-to-back starts in the KLM Open and the DS Automobiles 83° Open d'Italia. A T2 finish in the Open de España saw him move up to 50th in OWGR. A week later, Chacarra won for the third time in 2026 in the DP World India Championship, which advanced him to no.1 on the Race to Dubai ranking.

Chacarra finished T3 in DP World Tour Championship but was leapfrog by Rory McIlroy who finished solo 2nd to claim the Race to Dubai title. With the 2nd place finish, Chacarra earned additional $1 million and a PGA Tour card for 2027 season.

== Amateur wins ==
- 2017 Grand Prix de Landes
- 2019 Copa de Andalusia
- 2021 European Amateur Team Championship (individual medal)
- 2022 Amer Ari Invitational, National Invitational Tournament, NCAA Columbus Regional

== Professional wins (6) ==
=== European Tour wins (4) ===
No.	Date	Tournament	Winning score	Margin of victory	Runner-up
1	30 Mar 2025	Hero Indian Open^{1}	−4 (70-70-73-71=284)	2 strokes	(Japan) Keita Nakajima
2	7 Jun 2026	KLM Open	−11 (69-69-65-70=273)	1 stroke	(Finland) Oliver Lindell
3	28 Jun 2026	DS Automobiles Open d'Italia	−24 (66-65-65-64=260)	5 strokes	(England) Matt Wallace
4	18 Oct 2026	DP World India Championship^{1}	−21 (67-67-63-70=267)	2 strokes	(New Zealand) Daniel Hillier

^{1}Co-sanctioned by the Professional Golf Tour of India

=== Asian Tour wins (1) ===
Legend
International Series (1)
Other Asian Tour (0)

No.	Date	Tournament	Winning score	Margin of victory	Runner-up
1	27 Aug 2023	St Andrews Bay Championship	−19 (68-66-68-67=269)	Playoff	(Australia) Matt Jones

Asian Tour playoff record (1–0)

No.	Year	Tournament	Opponent	Result
1	2023	St Andrews Bay Championship	(Australia) Matt Jones	Won with par on tenth extra hole

=== LIV Golf Invitational Series wins (1) ===
No.	Date	Tournament	Winning score	Margin of victory	Runner-up
1	9 Oct 2022	LIV Golf Invitational Bangkok^{1}	−19 (65-63-69=197)	3 strokes	(United States) Patrick Reed

^{1}Co-sanctioned by the MENA Tour

== Results in major championships ==
Tournament	2024	2025	2026
Masters Tournament			
PGA Championship		CUT	
U.S. Open	CUT		
The Open Championship			T46

Did not play

CUT = missed the half-way cut
"T" indicates a tie for a place

== Team appearances ==
=== Amateur ===
- European Boys' Team Championship (representing Spain): 2017, 2018 (winners)
- Palmer Cup (representing the international team): 2021
- European Amateur Team Championship (representing Spain): 2019, 2021

== See also ==
- 2026 Race to Dubai dual card winners
