= 2026 LIV Golf League =

Golf tour season

2026 LIV Golf League season
- Duration: 5 February 2026 – 30 August 2026
- Number of official events: 12 (Note: A further two tournaments were either cancelled or postponed.)
- Most wins: (United States) Bryson DeChambeau (2) (Australia) Lucas Herbert (2) (Chile) Joaquín Niemann (2) (Spain) Jon Rahm (2)
- Individual points list: (Spain) Jon Rahm
- Team champions: 4Aces GC
- Money list: (Spain) Jon Rahm

The 2026 LIV Golf League was the fifth and final season of LIV Golf. The season consisted of 72-hole tournaments, featuring 57 players and no cut, with a team championship event at the season end.

On November 5, 2026, LIV Golf announced that it was folding.

== Format changes ==
Tournaments in the 2026 season were contested over 72 holes, extended from 54 holes previously.

== Team changes ==
Stinger GC was rebranded as Southern Guards GC and Iron Heads GC as Korean Golf Club ahead of the season. Smash GC was renamed OKGC ahead of LIV Golf Virginia.

== Player movements ==
From the end of the 2025 season until the beginning of the 2026 season there were numerous changes to team rosters.

=== Departures ===
The following players (full-time only) were no longer with LIV Golf after the conclusion of the 2025 season:

- Brooks Koepka came to an "amicable and mutually agreed" early release from his contract, which had one year remaining. Talor Gooch was appointed as the new captain of Smash GC, subsequently renamed OKGC. Koepka subsequently rejoined the PGA Tour.
- Matt Jones became a free agent after Ripper GC elected not to re-sign him. With no other team looking to sign him, he entered the LIV Promotions Event to try and regain a place in the league. He failed to earn one of the three places available but finished in the top-ten to earn a place on the International Series for 2026.
- Jinichiro Kozuma and Kevin Na were not retained by Iron Heads GC (which was rebranded to Korean Golf Club, with an all-Korean lineup), and were not picked up by another team.
- Patrick Reed left after he was unable to agree terms on a contract extension. He had Honorary Life Membership of the European Tour and was eligible to play on the PGA Tour again after August 25, 2026.

=== Relegated players ===
Players (full-time only) who finished in places 49th and below were relegated from the LIV Golf League and could not be signed by another team unless they earned their way back into the 2026 season through the LIV Golf Promotions event.

The following table lists players who were relegated following the 2025 season.

Player	2025 Team	2025 Finish	2026 Status/Tour	Ref.
(Sweden) Henrik Stenson	Majesticks GC	49th	European Tour	
(United States) Andy Ogletree	HyFlyers GC	50th		
(Chile) Mito Pereira	Torque GC	51st	n/a (Note: In December 2025, Pereira announced his retirement from professional golf.)	
(South Korea) Jang Yu-bin	Iron Heads GC	53rd		
(United States) Anthony Kim	Wild card	55th	LIV Golf League (Note: Regained place via LIV Golf Promotions in January 2026.)	
(Denmark) Frederik Kjettrup	Cleeks GC	57th		

=== Free agents ===
Players who declined their contract extensions, along with those who finished in places 25–44 of the individual standings, also called the Open Zone, whose contracts expired after the season became free agents and could negotiate with any team. Free agents were not guaranteed to be signed and may have lost their playing privileges in 2026 if they were not signed. The free agency period began on 30 October 2025.

Player	2025 Team	2025 Finish	2026 Team	Ref.
(Mexico) Abraham Ancer	Fireballs GC	12th	Torque GC	

=== Promoted players ===
League spots were awarded to the top two finishers in the 2025 International Series rankings, and the top three finishers at the LIV Golf Promotions, held in Florida in January 2026 with a purse of $1.5m.

Player	2025 Tour(s)	Qualification method	2026 Team/Wildcard	Ref.
(Zimbabwe) Scott Vincent	Japan Golf Tour, Asian Tour	International Series Order of Merit	Wildcard	
(Japan) Yosuke Asaji	Japan Golf Tour, Asian Tour	International Series Order of Merit	Wildcard	
(Philippines) Miguel Tabuena	Asian Tour	International Series Order of Merit	Wildcard (Note: Tabuena finished 3rd in the International Series Order of Merit and was promoted to Wildcard after Anthony Kim joined the 4Aces GC.)	
(Canada) Richard T. Lee	Asian Tour, Korean Tour	LIV Golf Promotions	Wildcard	
(Sweden) Björn Hellgren	Asian Tour	LIV Golf Promotions	Wildcard	
(United States) Anthony Kim	LIV Golf League	LIV Golf Promotions	Wildcard/4Aces GC (Note: Kim joined the 4Aces GC, replacing Patrick Reed, ahead of the Adelaide event.)	

=== Newly signed players ===
In addition to qualifying for the 2026 season through the International Series or via the LIV Golf Promotions event, players who have not played for LIV Golf (full-time) could join the 2026 season by signing with the league or with a team.

Player	2025 Tour(s)	2026 Team	Ref.
(France) Victor Perez	PGA Tour, European Tour	Cleeks GC	
(England) Laurie Canter	European Tour	Majesticks GC	
(Spain) Luis Masaveu	Challenge Tour, LIV Golf League (Fireballs GC, reserve)	Fireballs GC	
(Belgium) Thomas Detry	PGA Tour, European Tour	4Aces GC	
(Australia) Elvis Smylie	European Tour, PGA Tour of Australasia	Ripper GC	
(South Korea) An Byeong-hun	PGA Tour	Korean Golf Club	
(United States) Michael La Sasso	n/a (amateur)	HyFlyers GC	

=== Transfers ===
Player	From	To	Details	Ref.
(United States) Harold Varner III	4Aces GC	OKGC		

== Rosters ==
Team	Members				
Team	Captain(s)	Player 2	Player 3	Player 4	Substitute players
4Aces GC	(United States) Dustin Johnson	(Belgium) Thomas Detry	(Belgium) Thomas Pieters	(United States) Anthony Kim	(Philippines) Miguel Tabuena (Note: Tabuena substituted for the departed Patrick Reed in Riyadh.)
Cleeks GC	(Germany) Martin Kaymer	(England) Richard Bland	(Poland) Adrian Meronk	(France) Victor Perez	(United States) John Catlin (Note: Catlin substituted for Kaymer in Adelaide.) (Germany) Max Rottluff (Note: Rottluff substituted for Perez in Indianapolis.)
Crushers GC	(United States) Bryson DeChambeau	(England) Paul Casey	(United States) Charles Howell III	(India) Anirban Lahiri	(Mexico) Luis Carrera (Note: Carrera substituted for DeChambeau in Mexico City, after he withdrew following the third round.) (Australia) Travis Smyth (Note: Smyth substituted for Casey in South Korea and Andalucía.)
Fireballs GC	(Spain) Sergio García	(Spain) Josele Ballester	(Spain) Luis Masaveu	(Spain) David Puig	
HyFlyers GC	(United States) Phil Mickelson	(United States) Michael La Sasso	(United States) Brendan Steele	(United States) Cameron Tringale	(United States) Ollie Schniederjans (Note: Schniederjans substituted for Mickelson in Riyadh.) (Australia) Wade Ormsby (Note: Ormsby substituted for Mickelson in Adelaide, Hong Kong and Singapore.) (Australia) Travis Smyth (Note: Smyth substituted for Mickelson in Mexico City.) (Zimbabwe) Scott Vincent (Note: Vincent substituted for Mickelson in Virginia, South Korea, Andalucía, the UK, New York and Indianapolis.)
Korean Golf Club	(South Korea) An Byeong-hun	(South Korea) Kim Min-kyu	(New Zealand) Danny Lee (South Korea) Mun Do-yeob (Note: In May 2026, Korean Golf Club announced that Danny Lee would be replaced by Mun Do-yeob in the team roster; with Lee being relegated to wildcard status.)	(South Korea) Song Young-han	
Legion XIII	(Spain) Jon Rahm	(England) Tyrrell Hatton	(Northern Ireland) Tom McKibbin	(United States) Caleb Surratt	(Germany) Max Rottluff (Note: Rottluff substituted for Hatton in South Korea.)
Majesticks Golf Club (Note: Poulter and Westwood were co-captains of Majesticks Golf Club.)	(England) Ian Poulter, (England) Lee Westwood		(England) Laurie Canter	(England) Sam Horsfield	(England) Ben Schmidt (Note: Schmidt substituted for Westwood in Riyadh and Adelaide.)
OKGC	(United States) Talor Gooch	(United States) Jason Kokrak	(Northern Ireland) Graeme McDowell	(United States) Harold Varner III	
RangeGoats GC	(United States) Bubba Watson	(New Zealand) Ben Campbell	(United States) Peter Uihlein	(United States) Matthew Wolff	(Australia) Cameron John (Note: John substituted for Campbell in New York, after he withdrew following the third round.) (United States) Ollie Schniederjans (Note: Schniederjans substituted for Campbell in Indianapolis.)
Ripper GC	(Australia) Cameron Smith	(Australia) Lucas Herbert	(Australia) Marc Leishman	(Australia) Elvis Smylie	(Australia) Travis Smyth (Note: Smyth substituted for Smylie in the UK, New York and Indianapolis.)
Southern Guards GC	(South Africa) Louis Oosthuizen	(South Africa) Dean Burmester	(South Africa) Branden Grace	(South Africa) Charl Schwartzel	(Australia) Wade Ormsby (Note: Ormsby substituted for Oosthuizen in Andalucía, after he withdrew following the third round.) (South Africa) Martin Vorster (Note: Vorster substituted for Oosthuizen in the UK and New York.)
Torque GC	(Chile) Joaquín Niemann	(Mexico) Abraham Ancer	(Colombia) Sebastián Muñoz	(Mexico) Carlos Ortiz	

== Schedule ==
The following table lists official events during the 2026 season.

Date	Tournament	Host country	Purse (US$)		Individual winner (Note: The number in brackets after each winner's name is the number of LIV Golf League events they had won up to and including that tournament.)	Winning team	OWGR points	Notes
Date	Tournament	Host country	Individual	Team	Individual winner	Winning team	OWGR points	Notes
7 Feb	LIV Golf Riyadh	Saudi Arabia	20,000,000	10,000,000	(Australia) Elvis Smylie (1)	Ripper GC	22.99	
15 Feb	LIV Golf Adelaide	Australia	20,000,000	10,000,000	(United States) Anthony Kim (1)	Ripper GC	23.14	
8 Mar	LIV Golf Hong Kong	Hong Kong	20,000,000	10,000,000	(Spain) Jon Rahm (3)	4Aces GC	23.01	
15 Mar	LIV Golf Singapore	Singapore	20,000,000	10,000,000	(United States) Bryson DeChambeau (4)	4Aces GC	23.20	
22 Mar	LIV Golf South Africa	South Africa	20,000,000	10,000,000	(United States) Bryson DeChambeau (5)	Crushers GC	24.13	New tournament
19 Apr	LIV Golf Mexico City	Mexico	20,000,000	10,000,000	(Spain) Jon Rahm (4)	Legion XIII	23.28	
10 May	Maaden LIV Golf Virginia	United States	20,000,000	10,000,000	(Australia) Lucas Herbert (1)	4Aces GC	24.02	
31 May	LIV Golf Korea	South Korea	20,000,000	10,000,000	(Chile) Joaquín Niemann (8)	Crushers GC	23.42	
7 Jun	LIV Golf Andalucía	Spain	20,000,000	10,000,000	(England) Tyrrell Hatton (2)	Legion XIII	23.82	
~~28 Jun~~	LIV Golf Louisiana	United States	~~20,000,000~~	~~10,000,000~~	Postponed		–	New tournament
26 Jul	LIV Golf UK	England	20,000,000	10,000,000	(Australia) Lucas Herbert (2)	Ripper GC	21.96	
9 Aug	LIV Golf New York	United States	20,000,000	10,000,000	(Chile) Joaquín Niemann (9)	Crushers GC	22.04	
23 Aug	LIV Golf Indianapolis	United States	10,100,000	30,000,000	(United States) Michael La Sasso (1)	Legion XIII	20.73	
~~30 Aug~~	Aramco LIV Team Championship Michigan	United States	n/a	~~40,000,000~~	n/a	Cancelled	n/a	Team Championship

== Points list ==
=== Individual points list ===
The individual points list was based on tournament results during the season, calculated using a points-based system.

Position	Player	Team	Points
1	(Spain) Jon Rahm	Legion XIII	1,574
2	(United States) Bryson DeChambeau	Crushers GC	789
3	(Chile) Joaquín Niemann	Torque GC	565
4	(Australia) Lucas Herbert	Ripper GC	553
5	(England) Tyrrell Hatton	Legion XIII	462

=== Team points list ===
The team points list was based on tournament results during the season, calculated using a points-based system.

Position	Team	Points
1	4Aces GC	150
2	Ripper GC	147
3	Legion XIII	145
4	Crushers GC	136
5	Torque GC	90

== Money list ==
The money list was based on prize money won during the season, calculated in U.S. dollars.

Position	Player	Prize money ($)		
Position	Player	Individual	Bonus	Total
1	(Spain) Jon Rahm	19,991,708	6,000,000	25,991,708
2	(United States) Bryson DeChambeau	15,191,250	3,000,000	18,191,250
3	(Chile) Joaquín Niemann	11,188,639	1,000,000	12,188,639
4	(Australia) Lucas Herbert	10,917,681		10,917,681
5	(England) Tyrrell Hatton	9,116,125		9,116,125
