= International Series (golf) =

Tournament information
- Location: International
- Established: 2022
- Tour: Asian Tour
- Format: Stroke play
- Final year: 2026

Tournament record score
- Aggregate: 253 Tom McKibbin (2025)
- To par: −27 as above

Final champion
- (Zimbabwe) Scott Vincent

The International Series was a series of men's professional golf tournaments played internationally, as part of the Asian Tour.

== History ==
The series was unveiled in February 2022. It was confirmed that 10 events will be added alongside the Asian Tour schedule for the next 10 years, with each event featuring prize funds between US$1,500,000 and US$2,000,000. The investment was backed by LIV Golf.

The first event was played in March 2022 with the International Series Thailand. American Sihwan Kim won his first Asian Tour event shooting 26-under-par, beating Phachara Khongwatmai by two shots.

The next event was played at Slaley Hall in Northumberland, England. This was the first Asian Tour event to be staged in the United Kingdom. The original date of the event was rescheduled a week earlier due to the first event of the LIV Golf Invitational Series being scheduled to take place on the same week at the Centurion Club. Scott Vincent won the event, claiming his first Asian Tour victory and becoming the first Zimbabwean to win on the Asian Tour.

Following the International Series England, the Asian Tour announced the next two events as part of the International Series. They were to take place in Singapore and South Korea, played in back-to-back weeks in August 2022.

After the conclusion of the International Series Korea in August 2022, the Asian Tour again added two more International Series events to their schedule. They were to be played in Morocco and Egypt, in back-to-back weeks in November. On 28 September 2022, it was announced that the BNI Indonesian Masters had been added to the tour schedule as an International Series event.

Scott Vincent won the inaugural International Series Order of Merit, gaining a place in the 2023 LIV Golf League.

Following the announcement of the Public Investment Fund's withdrawal of funding from LIV Golf in April 2026, the International Series was later scrapped in August 2026, with the remaining events scheduled for 2026 either being cancelled or downgraded to regular Asian Tour events.

== Order of Merit winners ==
Season	Player	Points
2025	(Zimbabwe) Scott Vincent (2)	335
2024	(Chile) Joaquín Niemann	1,126
Season	Player	Prize money (US$)
2023	(United States) Andy Ogletree	1,101,828
2022	(Zimbabwe) Scott Vincent	517,845

== 2022 season ==
=== Schedule ===
Date	Tournament	Winner	Score	To par	Margin of victory	Runner(s)-up	Ref.
6 Mar	International Series Thailand	(United States) Sihwan Kim	262	−26	2 strokes	(Thailand) Phachara Khongwatmai	
5 Jun	International Series England	(Zimbabwe) Scott Vincent	272	−12	1 stroke	(Australia) Travis Smyth	
14 Aug	International Series Singapore	(Thailand) Nitithorn Thippong	272	−16	1 stroke	(Malaysia) Gavin Green (Thailand) Phachara Khongwatmai (Canada) Richard T. Lee	
21 Aug	International Series Korea	(South Korea) Ok Tae-hoon	269	−15	1 stroke	(South Korea) Kim Bi-o	
6 Nov	International Series Morocco	(Thailand) Jazz Janewattananond	280	−12	1 stroke	(Canada) Richard T. Lee	
13 Nov	International Series Egypt	(United States) Andy Ogletree	257	−23	4 strokes	(Austria) Bernd Wiesberger	
4 Dec	BNI Indonesian Masters	(Thailand) Sarit Suwannarut	268	−20	4 strokes	(India) Anirban Lahiri	

=== Order of Merit ===
The Order of Merit was based on prize money won during the season, calculated in U.S. dollars. The leading player earned status to play in the 2023 LIV Golf League.

Position	Player	Prize money ($)
1	(Zimbabwe) Scott Vincent	517,845
2	(United States) Sihwan Kim	437,133
3	(Thailand) Jazz Janewattananond	388,094
4	(Canada) Richard T. Lee	365,315
5	(Thailand) Phachara Khongwatmai	346,455

== 2023 season ==
=== Schedule ===
Date	Tournament	Winner	Score	To par	Margin of victory	Runner(s)-up	Ref.
12 Feb	International Series Oman	(Japan) Takumi Kanaya	278	−10	4 strokes	(United States) Berry Henson (Thailand) Sadom Kaewkanjana	
19 Feb	International Series Qatar	(United States) Andy Ogletree	281	−7	3 strokes	(Thailand) Gunn Charoenkul	
12 Mar	International Series Thailand	(Australia) Wade Ormsby	268	−20	Playoff	(Thailand) Chonlatit Chuenboonngam	
16 Apr	International Series Vietnam	(Zimbabwe) Kieran Vincent	269	−19	1 stroke	(India) Anirban Lahiri (Australia) Kevin Yuan	
20 Aug	International Series England	(United States) Andy Ogletree	268	−16	7 strokes	(England) Ian Poulter	
27 Aug	St Andrews Bay Championship	(Spain) Eugenio Chacarra	269	−19	Playoff	(Australia) Matt Jones	
8 Oct	International Series Singapore	(Spain) David Puig	269	−19	6 strokes	(South Korea) Eom Jae-woong	
5 Nov	Volvo China Open	(Thailand) Sarit Suwannarut	269	−19	6 strokes	(China) Chen Guxin (Hong Kong) Kho Taichi	
12 Nov	Hong Kong Open	(New Zealand) Ben Campbell	261	−19	1 stroke	(Australia) Cameron Smith	
19 Nov	BNI Indonesian Masters	(India) Gaganjeet Bhullar	260	−24	5 strokes	(India) Karandeep Kochhar	

=== Order of Merit ===
The Order of Merit was based on prize money won during the International Series, calculated in U.S. dollars. The leading player on the International Series Order of Merit earned status to play in the 2024 LIV Golf League.

Position	Player	Prize money ($)
1	(United States) Andy Ogletree	1,101,828
2	(Spain) David Puig	577,800
3	(New Zealand) Ben Campbell	524,488
4	(Zimbabwe) Kieran Vincent	468,655
5	(Japan) Takumi Kanaya	426,233

== 2024 season ==
=== Schedule ===
Date	Tournament	Winner	Score	To par	Margin of victory	Runner(s)-up	Ref.
25 Feb	International Series Oman	(Mexico) Carlos Ortiz	269	−19	4 strokes	(South Africa) Louis Oosthuizen	
17 Mar	International Series Macau	(United States) John Catlin	257	−23	Playoff	(Spain) David Puig	
7 Jul	International Series Morocco	(New Zealand) Ben Campbell	277	−15	Playoff	(United States) John Catlin	
11 Aug	International Series England	(United States) Peter Uihlein	264	−20	7 strokes	(England) Andy Sullivan (United States) Caleb Surratt	
20 Oct	Black Mountain Championship	(United States) M. J. Maguire	265	−23	Playoff	(United States) John Catlin	
27 Oct	International Series Thailand	(Taiwan) Lee Chieh-po	259	−21	1 stroke	(Canada) Richard T. Lee (United States) Peter Uihlein	
3 Nov	BNI Indonesian Masters	(Canada) Richard T. Lee	265	−23	4 strokes	(Taiwan) Chang Wei-lun (Thailand) Phachara Khongwatmai	
24 Nov	Link Hong Kong Open	(United States) Patrick Reed	258	−22	3 strokes	(New Zealand) Ben Campbell	
30 Nov	International Series Qatar	(United States) Peter Uihlein	272	−16	5 strokes	(South Africa) Charl Schwartzel	
7 Dec	PIF Saudi International	(Chile) Joaquín Niemann	263	−21	Playoff	(Australia) Cameron Smith (United States) Caleb Surratt	

=== Order of Merit ===
The Order of Merit was based on tournament results during the season, calculated using a points-based system. The leading player on the International Series Order of Merit earned status to play in the 2025 LIV Golf League. (Note: As Niemann was already contracted with LIV Golf for the 2025 season, nobody from the 2024 International Series Order of Merit was promoted.)

Position	Player	Points
1	(Chile) Joaquín Niemann	1,126
2	(United States) Peter Uihlein	1,113
3	(New Zealand) Ben Campbell	1,087
4	(United States) John Catlin	963
5	(Canada) Richard T. Lee	704

== 2025 season ==
=== Schedule ===
Date	Tournament	Winner	Score	To par	Margin of victory	Runner(s)-up	Ref.
2 Feb	International Series India	(United States) Ollie Schniederjans	278	−10	4 strokes	(United States) Bryson DeChambeau	
23 Mar	International Series Macau	(Mexico) Carlos Ortiz	258	−22	3 strokes	(United States) Patrick Reed	
11 May	International Series Japan	(Australia) Lucas Herbert	264	−20	5 strokes	(South Korea) Song Young-han (Japan) Yuta Sugiura	
6 Jul	International Series Morocco	(Zimbabwe) Scott Vincent	278	−14	4 strokes	(Thailand) Danthai Boonma	
5 Oct	Jakarta International Championship	(Australia) Wade Ormsby	268	−12	Playoff	(Zimbabwe) Scott Vincent	
~~12 Oct~~	International Series Cambodia	Cancelled (Note: Cancelled due to the 2025 Cambodia–Thailand border conflict.)					
26 Oct	International Series Philippines	(Philippines) Miguel Tabuena	264	−24	3 strokes	(Japan) Yosuke Asaji (Japan) Kazuki Higa	
2 Nov	Link Hong Kong Open	(Northern Ireland) Tom McKibbin	253	−27	7 strokes	(United States) Peter Uihlein	
9 Nov	Moutai Singapore Open	(Japan) Yosuke Asaji	269	−19	Playoff	(South Korea) Wang Jeung-hun	
22 Nov	PIF Saudi International	(Spain) Josele Ballester	262	−22	3 strokes	(United States) Caleb Surratt	

=== Order of Merit ===
The Order of Merit was based on tournament results during the season, calculated using a points-based system. The top two players on the International Series Order of Merit earned status to play in the 2026 LIV Golf League.

Position	Player	Points
1	(Zimbabwe) Scott Vincent	335
2	(Japan) Yosuke Asaji	285
3	(Philippines) Miguel Tabuena	260
4	(Australia) Lucas Herbert	253
5	(United States) Caleb Surratt	238

== 2026 season ==
=== Schedule ===
Date	Tournament	Winner	Score	To par	Margin of victory	Runner(s)-up	Ref.
5 Apr	International Series Japan	(Australia) Travis Smyth	269	−15	1 stroke	(Japan) Ryosuke Kinoshita (Thailand) Pavit Tangkamolprasert	
26 Apr	Singapore Open	(South Korea) Ham Jeong-woo	268	−16	2 strokes	(Australia) Cameron John	
14 Jun	International Series Morocco	(Hong Kong) Kho Taichi	273	−19	1 stroke	(United States) Bubba Watson	
~~11 Oct~~	International Series India	Cancelled					
~~25 Oct~~	Link Hong Kong Open	Removed (Note: Tournament had International Series event status removed following the restructuring of LIV Golf after the Public Investment Fund's announcement of withdrawal of funding.)					
~~8 Nov~~	International Series China	Cancelled					
~~15 Nov~~	Philippine Open	Removed					
~~21 Nov~~	PIF Saudi International	Removed					

== Multiple winners ==
Rank	Player	Wins	Tournaments won
1	(United States) Andy Ogletree	3	2022 International Series Egypt, 2023 International Series Qatar, 2023 International Series England
T2	(New Zealand) Ben Campbell	2	2023 Hong Kong Open, 2024 International Series Morocco
T2	(Australia) Wade Ormsby	2	2025 International Series Thailand, 2025 Jakarta International Championship
T2	(United States) Peter Uihlein	2	2024 International Series England, 2024 International Series Qatar
T2	(Zimbabwe) Scott Vincent	2	2022 International Series England, 2025 International Series Morocco

== See also ==
- Rolex Series (golf)
