= 2025 Asian Tour =

Golf tour season

2025 Asian Tour season
- Duration: 23 January 2025 – 13 December 2025
- Number of official events: 21 (Note: One further tournament was cancelled.)
- Most wins: (Japan) Kazuki Higa (2)
- Order of Merit: (Japan) Kazuki Higa
- International Series Order of Merit: (Zimbabwe) Scott Vincent
- Player of the Year: (Japan) Kazuki Higa
- Rookie of the Year: (United States) Ollie Schniederjans

The 2025 Asian Tour was the 30th season of the modern Asian Tour (formerly the Asian PGA Tour), the main professional golf tour in Asia (outside of Japan) since it was established in 1995.

== Changes for 2025 ==
In October 2024, it was confirmed that the Philippine Open would return to the Asian Tour schedule for the first time since 2015. In December, it was also confirmed that the International Series would venture into India for the first time. The initial schedule was released later in December 2024.

== Schedule ==
The following table lists official events during the 2025 season.

Date	Tournament	Host country	Purse (US$)	Winner (Note: The number in brackets after each winner's name is the number of Asian Tour events they had won up to and including that tournament. This information is only shown for Asian Tour members.)	OWGR points	Other tours (Note: ANZ − PGA Tour of Australasia; IGPL − Indian Golf Premier League; JPN − Japan Golf Tour; KOR − Korean Tour; TWN − Taiwan PGA Tour.)	Notes
26 Jan	Smart Infinity Philippine Open	Philippines	500,000	(France) Julien Sale (1)	8.10		
2 Feb	International Series India	India	2,000,000	(United States) Ollie Schniederjans (1)	15.64		International Series (Note: Also a new tournament.)
2 Mar	New Zealand Open	New Zealand	NZ$2,000,000	(Australia) Ryan Peake (1)	9.73	ANZ	
23 Mar	International Series Macau	Macau	2,000,000	(Mexico) Carlos Ortiz (n/a)	13.63		International Series
4 May	GS Caltex Maekyung Open	South Korea	₩1,300,000,000	(South Korea) Mun Do-yeob (1)	8.75	KOR	
11 May	International Series Japan	Japan	2,000,000	(Australia) Lucas Herbert (n/a)	12.46		International Series
25 May	Kolon Korea Open	South Korea	₩1,400,000,000	(Thailand) Sadom Kaewkanjana (3)	8.58	KOR	
6 Jul	International Series Morocco	Morocco	2,000,000	(Zimbabwe) Scott Vincent (2)	10.27		International Series
31 Aug	Mandiri Indonesia Open	Indonesia	500,000	(Thailand) Suteepat Prateeptienchai (4)	7.04		
14 Sep	Shinhan Donghae Open	South Korea	₩1,500,000,000	(Japan) Kazuki Higa (2)	10.59	JPN, KOR	
21 Sep	Yeangder Tournament Players Championship	Taiwan	1,000,000	(Japan) Kazuki Higa (3)	8.09	TWN	
28 Sep	Mercuries Taiwan Masters	Taiwan	1,000,000	(Thailand) Rattanon Wannasrichan (3)	6.92	TWN	
5 Oct	Jakarta International Championship	Indonesia	2,000,000	(Australia) Wade Ormsby (5)	9.59		International Series
~~12 Oct~~	International Series Cambodia	Cambodia	–	Cancelled (Note: Cancelled due to the 2025 Cambodia–Thailand border conflict.)	–		International Series
19 Oct	SJM Macao Open	Macau	1,000,000	(Germany) Dominic Foos (1)	8.07		
26 Oct	International Series Philippines	Philippines	2,000,000	(Philippines) Miguel Tabuena (4)	11.25		International Series
2 Nov	Link Hong Kong Open	Hong Kong	2,000,000	(Northern Ireland) Tom McKibbin (n/a)	14.91		International Series
9 Nov	Moutai Singapore Open	Singapore	2,000,000	(Japan) Yosuke Asaji (2)	9.57		International Series
16 Nov	Taiwan Glass Taifong Open	Taiwan	400,000	(Thailand) Ekpharit Wu (1)	4.42	TWN	
22 Nov	PIF Saudi International	Saudi Arabia	5,000,000	(Spain) Josele Ballester (n/a)	20.52		International Series
30 Nov	Bharath Classic Gujarat	India	500,000	(Thailand) Poosit Supupramai (1)	3.35	IGPL	New tournament
13 Dec	Saudi Open	Saudi Arabia	1,000,000	(Sweden) Björn Hellgren (1)	6.13		

== Order of Merit ==
The Order of Merit was based on tournament results during the season, calculated using a points-based system.

Position	Player	Points
1	(Japan) Kazuki Higa	2,082
2	(Zimbabwe) Scott Vincent	1,883
3	(Philippines) Miguel Tabuena	1,403
4	(Thailand) Rattanon Wannasrichan	1,248
5	(Japan) Yosuke Asaji	1,211

== International Series Order of Merit ==
The International Series Order of Merit was based on tournament results during the season, calculated using a points-based system. The top two players on the International Series Order of Merit earned status to play in the 2026 LIV Golf League.

Position	Player	Points
1	(Zimbabwe) Scott Vincent	335
2	(Japan) Yosuke Asaji	285
3	(Philippines) Miguel Tabuena	260
4	(Australia) Lucas Herbert	253
5	(United States) Caleb Surratt	238

== Awards ==
Award	Winner	Ref.
Player of the Year (Kyi Hla Han Award)	(Japan) Kazuki Higa	
Rookie of the Year	(United States) Ollie Schniederjans	

== See also ==
- 2025 Asian Development Tour
