= Scott Vincent (golfer) =

Zimbabwean golfer (born 1992)

Personal information
- Full name: Scott Nicholas Vincent
- Nationality: Zimbabwe
- Born: 20 May 1992 (age 34) Harare, Zimbabwe
- Height: 5 ft 10 in (1.78 m)
- Weight: 150 lb (68 kg; 11 st)
- Spouse: Kelsey Loupee (m. 2017)
- Children: 1

Career
- Sport: Golf
- College: Virginia Tech
- Turned professional: 2015
- Current tours: LIV Golf; Asian Tour; Japan Golf Tour
- Former tours: European Tour; Sunshine Tour; PGA Tour Canada; Japan Challenge Tour
- Professional wins: 6
- Highest ranking: 78 (18 September 2022) (as of 25 October 2026)

Number of wins by tour
- Japan Golf Tour: 3
- Asian Tour: 2
- Other: 1

Best results in major championships
- Masters Tournament: DNP
- PGA Championship: DNP
- U.S. Open: CUT: 2025
- The Open Championship: CUT: 2022, 2026

Achievements and awards
- Asian Tour Rookie of the Year: 2016
- Asian Tour International Series Order of Merit winner: 2022, 2025

Scott Nicholas Vincent (born 20 May 1992) is a Zimbabwean professional golfer. He has played predominantly on the LIV Golf League, Asian Tour and the Japan Golf Tour. He was the Asian Tour's Rookie of the Year in 2016, and in 2022 he won the tour's International Series Order of Merit, a feat he repeated in 2025. He has also won three times on the Japan Golf Tour. He represented Zimbabwe in the 2018 World Cup of Golf and the 2020 Tokyo Summer Olympics, being the first Zimbabwean golfer to do so.

== Professional career ==
Vincent turned professional in 2015. After five runner-up finishes on the Asian Tour between 2016 and 2018, he finally got his first major tour victory at the 2021 Sansan KBC Augusta on the Japan Golf Tour. He also won the ANA Open three weeks later.

In May 2022, Vincent won the Gateway to The Open Mizuno Open, beating Anthony Quayle in a playoff. The win also gained him an exemption into the 2022 Open Championship. A week later, Vincent won the International Series England at Slaley Hall in Northumberland, England. He carded a final-round 66 to win by one shot over Travis Smyth and claim his first Asian Tour victory.

Vincent's International Series England win gave him the status to play in the 2022 LIV Golf Invitational Series. He played in all eight events, with his best finish being 14th in LIV Golf Invitational Chicago. He played on three different teams before becoming a regular on Joaquín Niemann's Torque GC for the final five tournaments. He finished 42nd on the earnings list with just under $1.5 million in total individual and team earnings. In December 2022, Vincent won the Asian Tour's International Series Order of Merit, earning full status to play in the 2023 LIV Golf League season. He finished in the top-24 in the individual standings to earn a spot for the following season. Having been relegated the following season, he returned to the Asian Tour and once again won the International Series Order of Merit, to earn his place in the LIV Golf League for the 2026 season.

== Personal life ==
He met his wife, Kelsey Loupee, while attending Virginia Tech on a golf scholarship. The pair married in 2017. Loupee acts as his caddy. The pair live in Loupee's hometown of Denver, Colorado. His younger brother, Kieran, is also a professional golfer.

== Amateur wins ==
- 2014 Players Amateur

== Professional wins (6) ==
=== Japan Golf Tour wins (3) ===
No.	Date	Tournament	Winning score	Margin of victory	Runner-up
1	29 Aug 2021	Sansan KBC Augusta	−17 (64-70-69-68=271)	1 stroke	(Japan) Ryo Ishikawa
2	19 Sep 2021	ANA Open	−18 (72-63-69-66=270)	3 strokes	(Japan) Tomoharu Otsuki
3	29 May 2022	Gateway to The Open Mizuno Open	−12 (69-72-70-65=276)	Playoff	(Australia) Anthony Quayle

Japan Golf Tour playoff record (1–1)

No.	Year	Tournament	Opponent(s)	Result
1	2021	Golf Partner Pro-Am Tournament	(South Africa) Shaun Norris, (Japan) Tomoharu Otsuki	Norris won with par on second extra hole Otsuki eliminated by par on first hole
2	2022	Gateway to The Open Mizuno Open	(Australia) Anthony Quayle	Won with par on second extra hole

=== Asian Tour wins (2) ===
Legend
International Series (2)
Other Asian Tour (0)

No.	Date	Tournament	Winning score	Margin of victory	Runner-up
1	5 Jun 2022	International Series England	−12 (69-68-69-66=272)	1 stroke	(Australia) Travis Smyth
2	6 Jul 2025	International Series Morocco	−14 (71-66-71-70=278)	4 strokes	(Thailand) Danthai Boonma

Asian Tour playoff record (0–1)

No.	Year	Tournament	Opponent	Result
1	2025	Jakarta International Championship	(Australia) Wade Ormsby	Lost to par on first extra hole

=== Japan Challenge Tour wins (1) ===
No.	Date	Tournament	Winning score	Margin of victory	Runner-up
1	14 Jun 2019	Landic Challenge 7	−16 (66-65-69=200)	5 strokes	(Japan) Tomoyasu Sugiyama

== Results in major championships ==
Tournament	2022	2023	2024	2025	2026
Masters Tournament					
PGA Championship					
U.S. Open				CUT	
The Open Championship	CUT				CUT

Did not play

CUT = missed the half-way cut

== Results in World Golf Championships ==
Tournament	2018
Championship	
Match Play	
Invitational	
Champions	T37

Did not play

"T" = tied

== Team appearances ==
Amateur

- Eisenhower Trophy (representing Zimbabwe): 2010, 2012

Professional

- World Cup (representing Zimbabwe): 2018
