= Ryan Peake (golfer) =

Australian professional golfer (born 1993)

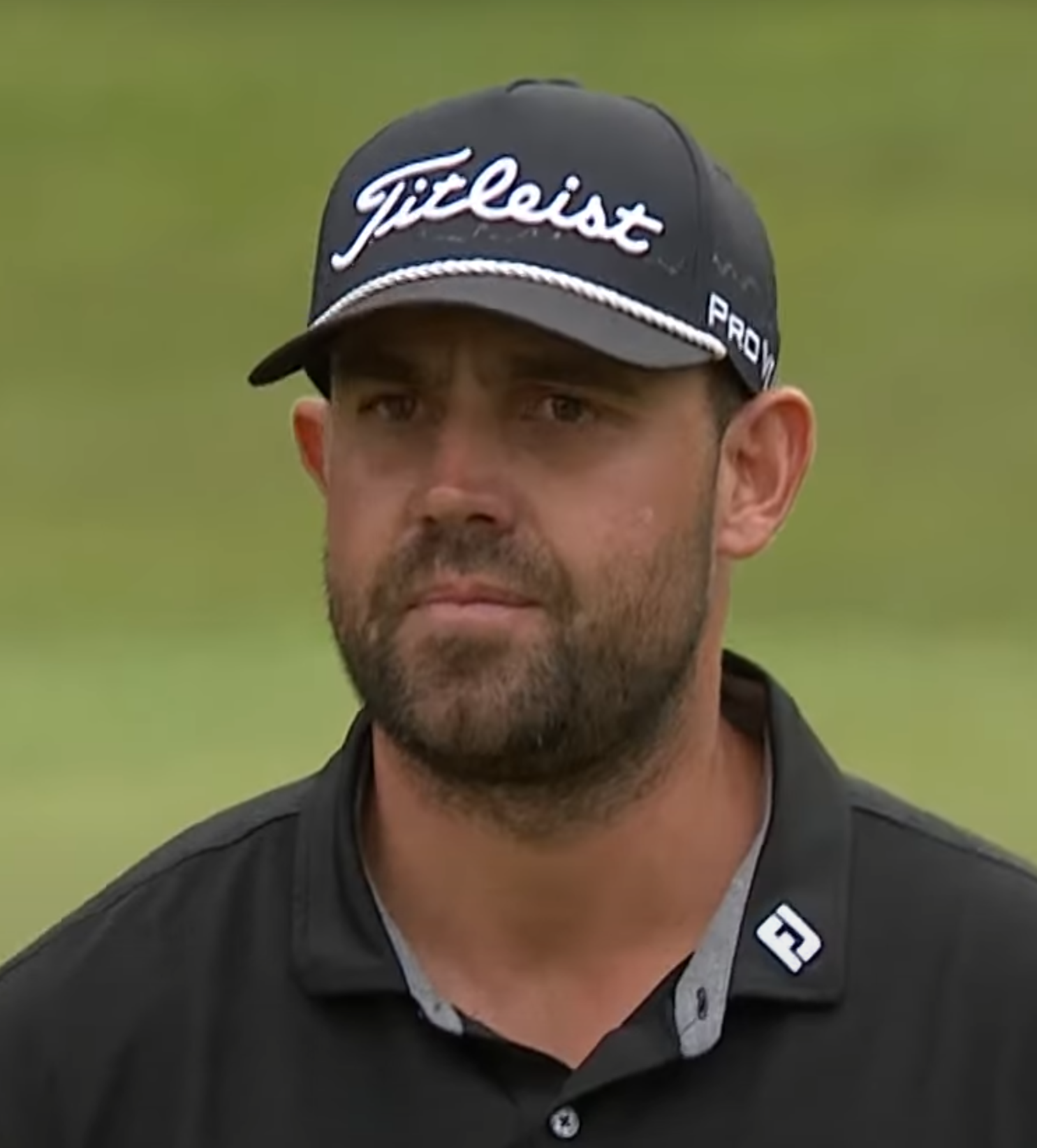
- Peake in 2025

Personal information
- Nickname: Peaky
- Nationality: Australia
- Born: 8 March 1993 (age 33) Perth, Western Australia
- Height: 185 cm (6 ft 1 in)
- Weight: 105 kg (231 lb)

Career
- Sport: Golf
- Turned professional: 2012
- Current tours: Asian Tour; European Tour; PGA Tour of Australasia
- Professional wins: 2

Number of wins by tour
- Asian Tour: 1
- PGA Tour of Australasia: 1
- Other: 1

Best results in major championships
- Masters Tournament: DNP
- PGA Championship: DNP
- U.S. Open: DNP
- The Open Championship: CUT: 2025

Achievements and awards
- PGA Tour of Australasia Rookie of the Year: 2024–25

Ryan Peake (born 8 March 1993) is an Australian professional golfer who has played on the Asian Tour, European Tour and PGA Tour of Australasia.

After having success as an amateur, Peake turned professional in 2012. He later joined the Rebels Motorcycle Club, an outlaw motorcycle club, and was sentenced to prison for assault in 2014. Peake was released in 2019 and made a return to golf, earning status on the PGA Tour of Australasia. He won the New Zealand Open in 2025 and finished second on the tour's order of merit, which secured him status on the European Tour.

== Early life and amateur career ==
Peake was born on 8 March 1993 in Perth, Western Australia, to Michelle and Mel Peake. He has British citizenship, as his father is originally from England. Mel was a bricklayer who became a greenkeeper after bricklaying took a toll on his body. Peake attended East Wanneroo Primary School and played sports such as football and cricket.

Peake's father, grandfather and cousin played golf recreationally at Lakelands Country Club in Gnangara, and he joined them at a young age. With a compact, left-handed swing, Peake showed immediate ability and found success in junior tournaments. He was an outcast in school and was bullied, to the point that his father would often escort him home. Peake eventually fought back against his main bully, after which the abuse stopped.

At age 13, Peake won the club championship at Lakelands for the first time. He received early tutelage from Ritchie Smith, known also as a coach of other Perth golfers such as Hannah Green, Minjee Lee, and Min Woo Lee. In 2009, Peake was runner-up at the South Australian Junior Masters and the Tamar Valley Junior Cup, and won the Tasmanian Junior Open Championship and West Australian Junior Championship.

As a 17-year-old, he represented Australia alongside Cameron Smith in the boys' division of the 2010 Trans Tasman Cup, where he helped Australia to defeat New Zealand. Also in 2010, Peake won the Handa Junior Masters, and made the cut at the Australian Open on the PGA Tour of Australasia. He tied for first at the Kurnia-Saujana Amateur Championship in May 2011, losing in a playoff to Gavin Green. Later in 2011, Peake finished in a tie for 10th at the WA Open.

== Professional career ==
=== Initial career and imprisonment ===
Peake turned professional in 2012, aged 19. In his professional debut, he finished in a tie for 36th at the 2012 WA Open. He also made a number of cuts on the Australian mini-tours, but failed to earn playing status during the 2012 PGA Tour of Australasia qualifying school at Peninsula Golf Club in Victoria. Peake experienced loneliness and depression while competing, and felt that he had let down his family, friends and coaches.

To fund his golf career, Peake worked in the mines in Western Australia, as well as other jobs such as plastering, bricklaying and cement mixing. He began drinking alcohol heavily, increased in weight from around 95 kg (209 lb) to 130 kg (287 lb), and stopped competing in golf. Around this time, he joined the Rebels Motorcycle Club, an outlaw motorcycle club he had interacted with since his teenage years. Peake later said: "It wasn't abnormal from where I was from to hang out in that sort of scene with my friends." After making multiple requests, he received his patch signifying membership at age 21. He recalled in 2025: "Where I was at that stage in my life, it was the only thing that brought me comfort. I felt like I belonged."

In November 2014, Peake and five other members of the Rebels Motorcycle Club confronted a man who had allegedly threatened the Rebels. A fight ensued and the man was left with significant injuries, including a fractured skull. Peake was arrested three weeks later. At the time of the incident, he was out on bail for a separate assault charge. He was sentenced to seven years' imprisonment for two counts of causing grievous bodily harm. Peake was initially imprisoned in Hakea Prison, a maximum-security facility, but served most of his sentence at Acacia Prison. While imprisoned, he lost the excess weight he had gained, studied to become an electrician, and gave golf tips to his fellow inmates. When Cameron Smith won the Australian PGA Championship in 2017, the tournament was shown on televisions in the prison and other inmates needled Peake after learning that Smith had been Peake's friend and teammate.

Soon after the 2017 Australian PGA, Peake was contacted by his former golf coach Ritchie Smith, who asked if he had considered resuming his golf career and offered to coach him. Peake then told his fellow Rebels he was thinking about leaving the club and restarting his golf career. Although membership of an outlaw motorcycle club is usually a lifelong commitment, Peake stated the other members were supportive of his plan: "I think they saw an opportunity for one of their own to better themselves. They were all telling me this could be my last chance. Go earn it." He then arranged for his biker vest and his Harley-Davidson Street Bob to be given to the Rebels. He also requested to be transferred to Wooroloo Prison Farm, a minimum-security prison. His petition was granted and he spent his final year in prison at Wooroloo, where he was allowed day release and began practising golf again. While still serving his sentence, he shot a bogey-free 66 to win the club championship at his home course Lakelands. In his winner's speech, he said: "I hope you enjoy your night but I'm back off to jail." Peake was released from prison in May 2019.

=== Post-release career, first professional victory ===
After his release from prison, Peake began to work as a greenkeeper at Lakelands Country Club. Although out of prison, he was still on parole for two years. Peake received permission from the Western Australia parole board to compete in the 2020 Australian Amateur held at Royal Queensland Golf Club. He advanced through the stroke play in the top 10, but was eliminated in the match play section by Elvis Smylie. Peake turned professional again afterwards, but there were no tournaments being held due to the COVID-19 pandemic. He subsequently worked as a trade assistant at a mine, until he began pursuing golf full-time in late 2022.

In 2023, Peake won three consecutive tournaments on the Western Australia swing of the adidas PGA Pro-Am Series: the Bennco Group Karratha Pro-Am, the Roy Hill Golf Classic and the Broome Furnishings – Carpet, Paint and Tiles Pro-Am. He later earned partial status on the 2023–24 PGA Tour of Australasia, and full status on the 2024–25 PGA Tour of Australasia. In December 2024, Peake won the Sandbelt Invitational at Royal Melbourne Golf Club, defeating David Micheluzzi in a playoff for the title.

In March 2025, Peake won the New Zealand Open, a PGA Tour of Australasia event co-sanctioned with the Asian Tour. He shot a final-round 66 at Millbrook Resort in Queenstown to total 23-under-par, finishing one stroke ahead of Kazuki Higa, Ian Snyman, and Jack Thompson. Before the tournament, he had difficulty travelling to New Zealand due to his criminal record. He arrived in Queenstown 36 hours before the tournament began. Peake became the first left-hander to win the New Zealand Open since Bob Charles in 1973. With the win, Peake also earned NZ$302,000 and secured entry to the 2025 Open Championship. He said of the prize money: "Although for my family it was a big lump sum, it still hasn't got me ahead of where your normal 32-year-old is, the amount of money that we've invested into trying to get that first win. You know, we're still in negative figures." Later in March, Peake was named Rookie of the Year for the 2024–25 PGA Tour of Australasia season. He finished second on the tour's Order of Merit, which earned him a card for the 2026 European Tour season.

Making his major championship debut at the 2025 Open Championship, Peake was paired with six-time major champion Phil Mickelson for the first two rounds. Peake shot rounds of 77-73 to total 8-over and missed the cut. In March 2026, Peake held the outright lead after 54 holes at the ISPS Handa Japan-Australasia Championship, a co-sanctioned event in Auckland, New Zealand. He shot a 1-over 73 in the final round to finish in a tie for sixth, three strokes behind the winner Travis Smyth.

Peake finished in tied-24th place at the Hero Indian Open in March 2026, which was his best finish since joining the European Tour. He missed three consecutive cuts afterwards as he struggled with irons which testing later discovered were bent. By October 2026, Peake had made only two cuts in his last 15 starts on the European Tour. He said of the 2026 season: "Obviously, it's not hard to tell that it was an awful year, but [I was] just so inexperienced out there. Everything was new and [I was] just too inexperienced."

== Personal life ==
Peake became engaged to his fiancée Lee while in New Zealand in 2025.

== Amateur wins ==
- 2009 Tasmanian Junior Open Championship, West Australian Junior Championship
- 2010 Handa Junior Masters

== Professional wins (2) ==
=== Asian Tour wins (1) ===
No.	Date	Tournament	Winning score	Margin of victory	Runners-up
1	2 Mar 2025	New Zealand Open^{1}	−23 (67-64-64-66=261)	1 stroke	(Japan) Kazuki Higa, (South Africa) Ian Snyman, (Australia) Jack Thompson

^{1}Co-sanctioned by the PGA Tour of Australasia

=== PGA Tour of Australasia wins (1) ===
No.	Date	Tournament	Winning score	Margin of victory	Runners-up
1	2 Mar 2025	New Zealand Open^{1}	−23 (67-64-64-66=261)	1 stroke	(Japan) Kazuki Higa, (South Africa) Ian Snyman, (Australia) Jack Thompson

^{1}Co-sanctioned by the Asian Tour

=== Other wins (1) ===
No.	Date	Tournament	Winning score	Margin of victory	Runner-up
1	19 Dec 2024	Sandbelt Invitational	−3 (70-68-75-67=280)	Playoff	(Australia) David Micheluzzi

== Results in major championships ==
Tournament	2025
Masters Tournament	
PGA Championship	
U.S. Open	
The Open Championship	CUT

Did not play

CUT = missed the halfway cut

== Team appearances ==
Amateur

- Trans Tasman Cup (representing Australia): 2010 (winners)
