= Kota Kaneko =

Japanese professional golfer (born 2002)

Personal information
- Nationality: Japan
- Born: 4 September 2002 (age 24) Aichi Prefecture, Japan
- Height: 1.83 m (6 ft 0 in)
- Weight: 77 kg (170 lb; 12.1 st)

Career
- Sport: Golf
- Turned professional: 2020
- Current tours: European Tour; Japan Golf Tour
- Former tour: Japan Challenge Tour
- Professional wins: 3

Number of wins by tour
- European Tour: 1
- Japan Golf Tour: 2

Best results in major championships
- Masters Tournament: DNP
- PGA Championship: CUT: 2026
- U.S. Open: DNP
- The Open Championship: CUT: 2026

Achievements and awards
- Japan Golf Tour money list winner: 2025
- Japan Golf Tour Most Valuable Player: 2025
- Sir Henry Cotton Rookie of the Year: 2026

Kota Kaneko (金子駆大, Kaneko Kota; born 4 September 2002) is a Japanese professional golfer who plays on the European Tour, where he claimed his first win in 2026 at the Austrian Alpine Open. He also plays on the Japan Golf Tour where he has won twice and topped the 2025 money list.

== Professional career ==
Kaneko turned professional in October 2020. He joined the Japan Challenge Tour in 2021, and was runner-up at the 2022 Daisendori Cup in Tottori.

In 2023, Kaneko joined the Japan Golf Tour, with a best finish of tied 3rd at the Japan Open Golf Championship. The following year he was runner-up at the ANA Open and Japan Players Championship. In 2025, he won twice and topped the money list, to earn status on the European Tour.

On the 2026 European Tour, Kaneko was runner-up at the Belgian Open and won the Austrian Alpine Open in Kitzbühel by two shots. He went on to win the Sir Henry Cotton Rookie of the Year award for the 2026 European Tour season.

== Professional wins (3) ==
=== European Tour wins (1) ===
No.	Date	Tournament	Winning score	Margin of victory	Runners-up
1	31 May 2026	Austrian Alpine Open	−18 (65-65-65-67=262)	2 strokes	(United States) Davis Bryant, (Portugal) Ricardo Gouveia

=== Japan Golf Tour wins (2) ===
No.	Date	Tournament	Winning score	Margin of victory	Runner(s)-up
1	18 May 2025	Kansai Open Golf Championship	−15 (63-69-66-67=265)	1 stroke	(Japan) Yosuke Asaji, (South Korea) Ryu Hyun-woo
2	16 Nov 2025	Mitsui Sumitomo Visa Taiheiyo Masters	−17 (67-65-63-68=263)	6 strokes	(Japan) Shota Akiyoshi

== Results in major championships ==
Tournament	2026
Masters Tournament	
PGA Championship	CUT
U.S. Open	
The Open Championship	CUT

Did not play

CUT = missed the halfway cut
