= Kieran Vincent =

Zimbabwean professional golfer

Personal information
- Nationality: Zimbabwe
- Born: 24 November 1997 (age 28) Harare, Zimbabwe
- Height: 5 ft 8 in (1.73 m)
- Weight: 140 lb (64 kg; 10 st)

Career
- Sport: Golf
- College: Liberty University
- Turned professional: 2022
- Current tours: Asian Tour; Sunshine Tour; Challenge Tour
- Former tours: PGA Tour Canada; LIV Golf
- Professional wins: 3

Number of wins by tour
- Asian Tour: 1
- Sunshine Tour: 2

Achievements and awards
- Big South Rookie of the Year: 2017

Kieran Vincent (born 24 November 1997) is a Zimbabwean professional golfer who currently plays on the Asian Tour and the Sunshine Tour. He won the 2023 International Series Vietnam.

== Career ==
Vincent was born in Harare and played college golf at Liberty University in Virginia, where he was Big South Conference Rookie of the Year in 2017.

He turned professional in 2022 and joined PGA Tour Canada and the Asian Tour in late 2022. In April 2023, he won the International Series Vietnam, coming from four shots back to overtake overnight leader Takumi Kanaya. He carded a six-under 66 to finish on 19-under overall, one shot ahead of Anirban Lahiri and Kevin Yuan.

== Personal life ==
Vincent's older brother, Scott, is also a professional golfer.

== Amateur wins ==
- 2018 Chapman Grand Slam
- 2019 Chapman Grand Slam

== Professional wins (3) ==
=== Asian Tour wins (1) ===
Legend
International Series (1)
Other Asian Tour (0)

No.	Date	Tournament	Winning score	Margin of victory	Runners-up
1	16 Apr 2023	International Series Vietnam	−19 (67-65-71-66=269)	1 stroke	(India) Anirban Lahiri, (Australia) Kevin Yuan

=== Sunshine Tour wins (2) ===
No.	Date	Tournament	Winning score	Margin of victory	Runner-up
1	26 May 2024	Kit Kat Cash & Carry Pro-Am	−21 (67-67-67-66=267)	4 strokes	(South Africa) Malcolm Mitchell
2	25 May 2025	Waterfall City Tournament of Champions	−18 (70-69-61-70=270)	4 strokes	(South Africa) Daniel van Tonder
