= Wade Ormsby =

Australian professional golfer (born 1980)

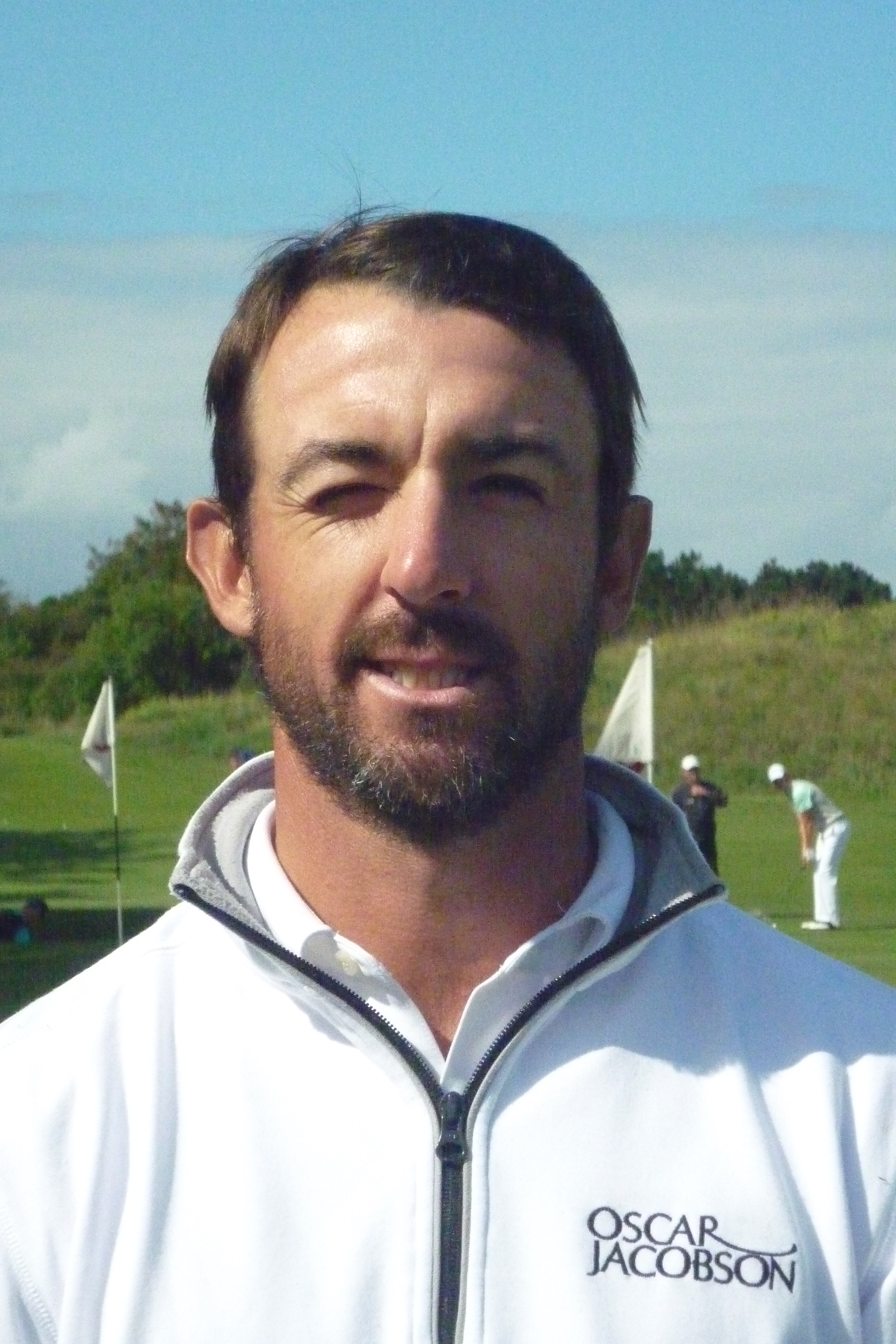

Personal information
- Nationality: Australia
- Born: 31 March 1980 (age 46) Adelaide, South Australia, Australia
- Height: 1.75 m (5 ft 9 in)
- Weight: 72 kg (159 lb; 11.3 st)
- Children: 2

Career
- Sport: Golf
- College: University of Houston
- Turned professional: 2001
- Current tour: Asian Tour
- Former tours: European Tour; PGA Tour of Australasia; Nationwide Tour; Challenge Tour; LIV Golf
- Professional wins: 5
- Highest ranking: 97 (7 January 2018)

Number of wins by tour
- European Tour: 1
- Asian Tour: 5

Best results in major championships
- Masters Tournament: DNP
- PGA Championship: DNP
- U.S. Open: T40: 2021
- The Open Championship: DNP

Wade Ormsby (born 31 March 1980) is an Australian professional golfer who plays on the Asian Tour. He also played in the inaugural LIV Golf Invitational Series.

== Career ==
Ormsby was born in Adelaide, South Australia, Australia. He attended the University of Houston in the United States for three years before turning professional in 2001.

Ormsby began his professional career in his home country, on the PGA Tour of Australasia, while also trying to play in Europe. He played his first full season on the European Tour in 2004, having earned his place via qualifying school at the end of 2003. He finished 112th on the Order of Merit in his first season to retain playing rights, and improved to 71st in 2005. He was then unable to retain his card automatically and regained it several times via return trips to qualifying school, in 2006, 2008, 2010 and 2013. After the 2013 qualifying school, however, he was able to remain on the tour for a number of years.

In 2006, he had his best season on the PGA Tour of Australasia, when he ended the season sixth on the Order of Merit. In 2008, Ormsby played on the second-tier U.S.-based Nationwide Tour, recording two top-10 finishes.

In November 2017, in his 264th European Tour start, Ormsby earned his maiden European Tour victory at the UBS Hong Kong Open, finishing one stroke ahead of four players. His previous best finish was joint runner-up in the Blue Chip New Zealand Open in December 2006.

Ormsby looked set for his first win in his home country at the 2019 ISPS Handa Vic Open, when he was two ahead of the field with two holes to play. However, he missed out on victory by a single stroke, finishing in a tie for second place, after making a double-bogey five at the par-3 17th hole, while eventual winner David Law eagled the final hole.

In January 2020, Ormsby won the Hong Kong Open for the second time, finishing four strokes ahead of Shane Lowry. In March 2023, Ormsby won the International Series Thailand, his fourth Asian Tour victory. He shot 20-under-par for four rounds, defeating Chonlatit Chuenboonngam in a playoff.

In 2022, Ormsby joined newly launched LIV Golf, playing the first season as captain of the Punch GC team. He has been a league reserve in each of the three subsequent seasons.

== Professional wins (5) ==
=== European Tour wins (1) ===
No.	Date	Tournament	Winning score	Margin of victory	Runners-up
1	26 Nov 2017 (2018 season)	UBS Hong Kong Open^{1}	−11 (68-68-65-68=269)	1 stroke	(Sweden) Alexander Björk, (Spain) Rafa Cabrera-Bello, (United States) Paul Peterson, (United States) Julian Suri

^{1}Co-sanctioned by the Asian Tour

=== Asian Tour wins (5) ===
Legend
International Series (2)
Other Asian Tour (3)

No.	Date	Tournament	Winning score	Margin of victory	Runner(s)-up
1	7 Apr 2013	Panasonic Open India^{1}	−9 (67-67-74-71=279)	1 stroke	(Thailand) Boonchu Ruangkit
2	26 Nov 2017	UBS Hong Kong Open^{2}	−11 (68-68-65-68=269)	1 stroke	(Sweden) Alexander Björk, (Spain) Rafa Cabrera-Bello, (United States) Paul Peterson, (United States) Julian Suri
3	12 Jan 2020	Hong Kong Open (2)	−17 (65-66-66-66=263)	4 strokes	(Republic of Ireland) Shane Lowry
4	12 Mar 2023	International Series Thailand	−20 (68-68-67-65=268)	Playoff	(Thailand) Chonlatit Chuenboonngam
5	5 Oct 2025	Jakarta International Championship	−12 (64-68-67-69=268)	Playoff	(Zimbabwe) Scott Vincent

^{1}Co-sanctioned by the Professional Golf Tour of India
^{2}Co-sanctioned by the European Tour

Asian Tour playoff record (2–0)

No.	Year	Tournament	Opponent	Result
1	2023	International Series Thailand	(Thailand) Chonlatit Chuenboonngam	Won with birdie on first extra hole
2	2025	Jakarta International Championship	(Zimbabwe) Scott Vincent	Won with par on first extra hole

== Playoff record ==
PGA Tour of Australasia playoff record (0–1)

No.	Year	Tournament	Opponents	Result
1	2014	Australian PGA Championship	(Australia) Greg Chalmers, (Australia) Adam Scott	Chalmers won with par on seventh extra hole Ormsby eliminated by birdie on third hole

== Results in major championships ==
Results not in chronological order in 2020.

Tournament	2017	2018
Masters Tournament		
U.S. Open	CUT	
The Open Championship		
PGA Championship		

Tournament	2019	2020	2021
Masters Tournament			
PGA Championship			
U.S. Open			T40
The Open Championship		NT	

Did not play

CUT = missed the half-way cut
NT = No tournament due to COVID-19 pandemic

== Results in World Golf Championships ==
Tournament	2018	2019	2020	2021
Championship	T50			T52
Match Play			NT^{1}	
Invitational	T39			T51
Champions			NT^{1}	NT^{1}

^{1}Cancelled due to COVID-19 pandemic

Did not play

NT = No tournament
"T" = Tied

== Team appearances ==
Amateur

- Australian Men's Interstate Teams Matches (representing South Australia): 1997

== See also ==
- 2006 European Tour Qualifying School graduates
- 2008 European Tour Qualifying School graduates
- 2010 European Tour Qualifying School graduates
- 2013 European Tour Qualifying School graduates
- List of golfers with most Asian Tour wins
