= Scott O'Neil =

International sports executive

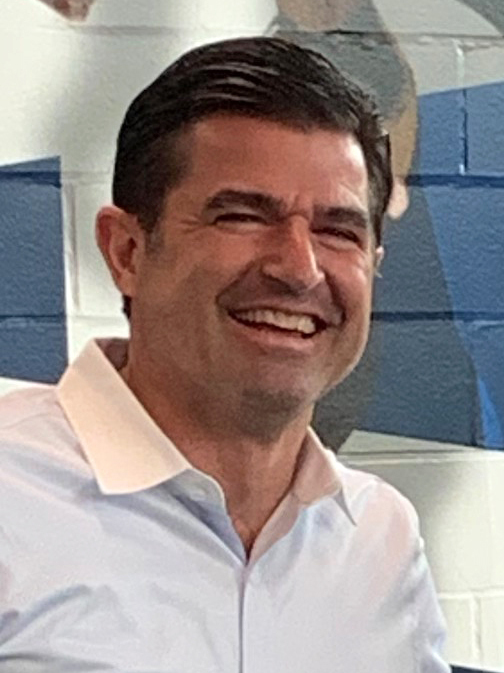
- O'Neil in 2019
- Born: United States
- Education: Villanova University (BA); Harvard Business School (MBA)
- Occupation: Sports executive
- Known for: CEO of LIV Golf

Scott O'Neil is an American sports executive who is the CEO of LIV Golf.

== Career ==
O'Neil began his career in sports management with roles at the New Jersey Nets and Philadelphia Eagles.

From 2008 to 2012, O'Neil served as President of Madison Square Garden Sports, overseeing the operations of the New York Knicks and New York Rangers. In 2013, he became the CEO of the Philadelphia 76ers, and later, he managed both the 76ers and the New Jersey Devils as the CEO of Harris Blitzer Sports & Entertainment.

In late 2022, O'Neil was appointed CEO of Merlin Entertainments.

Reports in late 2024 indicated that O'Neil would replace Greg Norman as CEO of LIV Golf. He officially assumed the role on January 15, 2025.
