= 2025 Korean Tour =

Golf tour season

2025 Korean Tour season
- Duration: 17 April 2025 – 9 November 2025
- Number of official events: 20
- Most wins: (South Korea) Ok Tae-hoon (3)
- Order of Merit: (South Korea) Ok Tae-hoon
- Player of the Year: (South Korea) Ok Tae-hoon
- Rookie of the Year: (Thailand) Sadom Kaewkanjana

The 2025 Korean Tour was the 48th season on the Korean Tour, the main professional golf tour in South Korea since it was formed in 1978.

== Schedule ==
The following table lists official events during the 2025 season.

Date	Tournament	Location	Purse (₩)	Winner (Note: The number in brackets after each winner's name is the number of Korean Tour events they had won up to and including that tournament. This information is only shown for Korean Tour members.)	OWGR points	Other tours (Note: ASA − Asian Tour; EUR − European Tour; JPN − Japan Golf Tour.)	Notes
20 Apr	DB Insurance Promy Open	Gangwon	1,000,000,000	(South Korea) Kim Baek-jun (1)	5.68		
27 Apr	Woori Financial Group Championship	Gyeonggi	1,500,000,000	(Canada) Richard T. Lee (4)	6.97		
4 May	GS Caltex Maekyung Open	Jeju	1,300,000,000	(South Korea) Mun Do-yeob (4)	8.75	ASA	
11 May	KPGA Classic	North Gyeongsang	700,000,000	(South Korea) Bae Yong-jun (2)	4.28		
18 May	SK Telecom Open	Jeju	1,300,000,000	(South Korea) Eom Jae-woong (3)	6.69		
25 May	Kolon Korea Open	South Chungcheong	1,400,000,000	(Thailand) Sadom Kaewkanjana (1)	8.58	ASA	
8 Jun	Baeksang Holdings-Asiad CC Busan Open	South Gyeongsang	1,000,000,000	(South Korea) Kim Hong-taek (3)	5.69		
15 Jun	Hana Bank Invitational	Gangwon	1,300,000,000	(South Africa) Shaun Norris (n/a)	9.53	JPN	
22 Jun	KPGA Championship	South Gyeongsang	1,600,000,000	(South Korea) Ok Tae-hoon (1)	7.91		
29 Jun	KPGA Gunsan CC Open	North Jeolla	700,000,000	(South Korea) Ok Tae-hoon (2)	6.57		
31 Aug	Dong-A Membership Exchange Group Open	North Jeolla	700,000,000	(South Korea) Park Sang-hyun (13)	6.59		
7 Sep	KPGA Founders Cup	North Gyeongsang	700,000,000	(South Korea) Mun Do-yeob (5)	6.52		
14 Sep	Shinhan Donghae Open	Gyeonggi	1,500,000,000	(Japan) Kazuki Higa (n/a)	10.59	ASA, JPN	
21 Sep	Golfzon Open	North Gyeongsang	1,000,000,000	(South Korea) Park Sung-kug (2)	6.98		
28 Sep	Hyundai Insurance KJ Choi Invitational	Gyeonggi	1,250,000,000	(South Korea) Jeon Ga-lam (4)	6.90		
4 Oct	KPGA Gyeongbuk Open	North Gyeongsang	700,000,000	(South Korea) Ok Tae-hoon (3)	4.76		New tournament
19 Oct	The Charity Classic	Gyeonggi	1,000,000,000	(South Korea) Choi Seung-bin (2)	5.76		
26 Oct	Genesis Championship	Gyeonggi	US$4,000,000	(South Korea) Lee Jung-hwan (3)	21.25	EUR	
2 Nov	Lexus Masters	South Gyeongsang	1,000,000,000	(South Korea) Kim Jae-ho (1)	5.64		
9 Nov	KPGA Tour Championship	Jeju	1,100,000,000	(South Korea) Park Sang-hyun (14)	3.95		

== Order of Merit ==
The Order of Merit was titled as the Genesis Points and was based on tournament results during the season, calculated using a points-based system. The top three players on the Order of Merit earned status to play on the 2026 European Tour (DP World Tour).

Position	Player	Points	Status earned
1	(South Korea) Ok Tae-hoon	7,204	Promoted to European Tour
2	(South Korea) Kim Baek-jun	5,176	Promoted to European Tour
3	(Canada) Richard T. Lee	4,965	Promoted to European Tour
4	(South Korea) Choi Jin-ho	4,731	
5	(South Korea) Bae Yong-jun	4,411	

== Awards ==
Award	Winner	Ref.
Player of the Year (Grand Prize Award)	(South Korea) Ok Tae-hoon	
Rookie of the Year (Myeong-chul Award)	(Thailand) Sadom Kaewkanjana	
