= 2025 Japan Golf Tour =

Golf tour season

2025 Japan Golf Tour season
- Duration: 10 April 2025 – 7 December 2025
- Number of official events: 25
- Most wins: (Japan) Kazuki Higa (2) (Japan) Kota Kaneko (2) (Japan) Tatsunori Shogenji (2)
- Money list: (Japan) Kota Kaneko
- Most Valuable Player: (Japan) Kota Kaneko
- Rookie of the Year: (Japan) Yuta Sugiura

The 2025 Japan Golf Tour was the 52nd season of the Japan Golf Tour (formerly the PGA of Japan Tour), the main professional golf tour in Japan since it was formed in 1973.

== Schedule ==
The following table lists official events during the 2025 season.

Date	Tournament	Location	Purse (¥)	Winner (Note: The number in brackets after each winner's name is the number of Japan Golf Tour events they had won up to and including that tournament. This information is only shown for Japan Golf Tour members.)	OWGR points	Other tours (Note: ASA − Asian Tour; KOR − Korean Tour; PGAT − PGA Tour.)	Notes
13 Apr	Token Homemate Cup	Mie	130,000,000	(Japan) Tatsunori Shogenji (1)	8.14		
27 Apr	Maezawa Cup	Chiba	200,000,000	(Japan) Takanori Konishi (1)	6.77		New tournament
4 May	The Crowns	Aichi	110,000,000	(Japan) Yosuke Asaji (4)	6.92		
18 May	Kansai Open Golf Championship	Shiga	80,000,000	(Japan) Kota Kaneko (1)	8.04		
25 May	Japan PGA Championship	Gifu	150,000,000	(Japan) Taisei Shimizu (1)	8.23		Japan major
1 Jun	Gateway to The Open Mizuno Open	Okayama	100,000,000	(Japan) Mikiya Akutsu (1)	8.38		
8 Jun	BMW Japan Golf Tour Championship Mori Building Cup	Ibaraki	150,000,000	(Japan) Taiga Semikawa (5)	8.45		Japan major
15 Jun	Hana Bank Invitational	South Korea	₩1,300,000,000	(South Africa) Shaun Norris (8)	9.53	KOR	
29 Jun	Japan Players Championship	Tochigi	50,000,000	(Japan) Tatsunori Shogenji (2)	8.73		
3 Aug	Richard Mille Charity Tournament	Ishikawa	100,000,000	(Japan) Tomoyo Ikemura (3)	8.81		New tournament
17 Aug	ISPS Handa Explosion in the Summer	Hokkaidō	60,000,000	(Japan) Kazuki Higa (7)	8.55		New tournament
24 Aug	ISPS Handa Summer Golf Battle	Hokkaidō	213,000,000	(Japan) Satoshi Kodaira (8)	9.04		New tournament
31 Aug	Sansan KBC Augusta	Fukuoka	100,000,000	(Japan) Yuwa Kosaihira (1)	8.93		
7 Sep	Lopia Fujisankei Classic	Yamanashi	110,000,000	(Japan) Taiga Nagano (1)	7.72		
14 Sep	Shinhan Donghae Open	South Korea	₩1,500,000,000	(Japan) Kazuki Higa (8)	10.59	ASA, KOR	
21 Sep	ANA Open	Hokkaidō	100,000,000	(Japan) Takumi Kanaya (8)	7.88		
28 Sep	Panasonic Open Golf Championship	Osaka	100,000,000	(Japan) Ryo Katsumata (1)	7.43		
5 Oct	Vantelin Tokai Classic	Aichi	110,000,000	(Japan) Suguru Shimoke (1)	7.32		
19 Oct	Japan Open Golf Championship	Tochigi	210,000,000	(Japan) Naoyuki Kataoka (2)	8.30		Japan major
2 Nov	Fortinet Players Cup	Chiba	150,000,000	(Japan) Taihei Sato (1)	6.46		New tournament
9 Nov	ACN Championship	Hyōgo	100,000,000	(Japan) Yuta Sugiura (3)	6.93		
16 Nov	Mitsui Sumitomo Visa Taiheiyo Masters	Shizuoka	200,000,000	(Japan) Kota Kaneko (2)	5.97		
23 Nov	Dunlop Phoenix Tournament	Miyazaki	200,000,000	(Japan) Yosuke Tsukada (2)	7.51		
30 Nov	Casio World Open	Kōchi	180,000,000	(Japan) Ryuichi Oiwa (1)	6.87		
7 Dec	Golf Nippon Series JT Cup	Tokyo	130,000,000	(Japan) Takashi Ogiso (2)	5.14		Japan major

=== Unofficial events ===
The following events were sanctioned by the Japan Golf Tour, but did not carry official money, nor were wins official.

Date	Tournament	Location	Purse (¥)	Winner(s)	OWGR points	Other tours	Notes
13 Apr	Masters Tournament	United States	US$21,000,000	(Northern Ireland) Rory McIlroy	100		Major championship
18 May	PGA Championship	United States	US$19,000,000	(United States) Scottie Scheffler	100		Major championship
15 Jun	U.S. Open	United States	US$21,500,000	(United States) J. J. Spaun	100		Major championship
20 Jul	The Open Championship	Northern Ireland	US$17,000,000	(United States) Scottie Scheffler	100		Major championship
12 Oct	Baycurrent Classic	Kanagawa	US$8,000,000	(United States) Xander Schauffele	38.61	PGAT	Limited-field event
14 Dec	Hitachi 3Tours Championship	Chiba	57,000,000	LPGA of Japan Tour	n/a		Team event

== Money list ==
The money list was based on prize money won during the season, calculated in Japanese yen. The top three players on the money list earned status to play on the 2026 European Tour (DP World Tour).

Position	Player	Prize money (¥)	Status earned
1	(Japan) Kota Kaneko	120,231,009	Promoted to European Tour
2	(Japan) Tatsunori Shogenji	96,911,920	Promoted to European Tour
3	(Japan) Taiga Semikawa	88,636,379	Promoted to European Tour
4	(Japan) Takashi Ogiso	88,427,866	
5	(Japan) Ryuichi Oiwa	84,306,136	

== Awards ==
Award	Winner	Ref.
Most Valuable Player	(Japan) Kota Kaneko	
Rookie of the Year (Shimada Trophy)	(Japan) Yuta Sugiura	

== Japan Challenge Tour ==
2025 Japan Challenge Tour season
- Duration: 2 April 2025 – 24 October 2025
- Number of official events: 13
- Most wins: (Japan) Ryota Wakahara (2)
- Points list: (Japan) Ryota Wakahara

The 2025 Japan Challenge Tour, titled as the 2025 ACN Tour, was the 40th season of the Japan Challenge Tour, the official development tour to the Japan Golf Tour.

=== ACN title sponsorship ===
In March, it was announced that the tour had signed a title sponsorship agreement with ACN, being renamed as the ACN Tour.

=== Schedule ===
The following table lists official events during the 2025 season.

Date	Tournament	Location	Purse (¥)	Winner (Note: The number in brackets after each winner's name is the number of Japan Challenge Tour events they had won up to and including that tournament. It is rare for someone to accumulate many wins on the Japan Challenge Tour as success at this level usually leads to promotion to the Japan Golf Tour.)	OWGR points
4 Apr	Novil Cup	Tokushima	15,000,000	(Japan) Kota Takeda (a) (1)	2.92
25 Apr	i Golf Shaper Challenge	Fukuoka	18,000,000	(Japan) Taiga Yamamoto (1)	2.73
9 May	Japan Players Championship Challenge	Fukui	15,000,000	(Japan) Taiga Mishima (1)	3.17
30 May	Taiheiyo Club Challenge Tournament	Saitama	15,000,000	(Japan) Shotaro Tanaka (1)	2.33
13 Jun	Landic Challenge 12	Fukuoka	18,000,000	(Japan) Ryunosuke Furukawa (1)	3.69
20 Jun	Japan Create Challenge	Fukuoka	20,000,000	(Japan) Yuto Katsumata (1)	3.85
4 Jul	Minami Akita CC Michinoku Challenge	Akita	15,000,000	(Japan) Yuki Moriyama (1)	3.56
8 Aug	Juchi Golf Challenge Tournament	Tochigi	15,000,000	(Japan) Ryota Wakahara (1)	3.35
30 Aug	Dunlop Phoenix Tournament Challenge	Fukushima	15,000,000	(Japan) Ryota Wakahara (2)	2.07
12 Sep	K-dash Second Challenge Cup	Ibaraki	20,000,000	(Japan) Yuki Kajimura (1)	3.29
3 Oct	Ryo Ishikawa Everyone Project Challenge	Tochigi	18,000,000	(Japan) Shu Fukuzumi (1)	2.04
10 Oct	Elite Grips Challenge	Hyōgo	15,000,000	(Japan) Genki Okada (1)	2.80
24 Oct	Delight Works JGTO Final	Ibaraki	20,000,000	(Japan) Taichiro Ideriha (1)	2.98

=== Points list ===
The points list was based on tournament results during the season, calculated using a points-based system. The top 20 players on the points list earned status to play on the 2026 Japan Golf Tour.

Position	Player	Points
1	(Japan) Ryota Wakahara	1,292
2	(Japan) Taichiro Idehira	1,192
3	(Japan) Shu Fukuzumi	1,004
4	(Japan) Genki Okada	988
5	(Japan) Taiga Yamamoto	974
