= Richard T. Lee (golfer) =

Canadian professional golfer

Personal information
- Full name: Richard Taehoon Lee
- Nationality: Canada
- Born: October 29, 1990 (age 36) Toronto, Ontario, Canada
- Height: 5 ft 10 in (1.78 m)
- Weight: 180 lb (82 kg; 13 st)

Career
- Sport: Golf
- Turned professional: 2007
- Current tours: Asian Tour; Korean Tour
- Former tours: Nationwide Tour; LIV Golf
- Professional wins: 6

Number of wins by tour
- Asian Tour: 3
- Other: 3

Best results in major championships
- Masters Tournament: DNP
- PGA Championship: DNP
- U.S. Open: WD: 2007
- The Open Championship: CUT: 2021

Achievements and awards
- Asian Tour Rookie of the Year: 2013

Richard Taehoon Lee (born October 29, 1990) is a Canadian professional golfer who plays on the Asian Tour and LIV Golf League. He played in the 2007 U.S. Open at the age of sixteen.

== Early life ==
Lee was born in Toronto, Canada. His father, Jeff, played professional tournament golf in South Korea and is now a teaching professional.

== Amateur career ==
In 2006, at the age of 15, Lee was the runner-up to Philip Francis at the U.S. Junior Amateur. The result gave him an exemption to sectional qualifying for the U.S. Open the following year. Lee finished as runner-up at his qualifier to earn entry to the 2007 U.S. Open, becoming the second youngest golfer in the 107-year history of the tournament. However, he did not finish the tournament as he injured his wrist in the second round. He finished at +20, and turned professional at the conclusion of the tournament.

== Professional career ==
In 2011, Lee played on the Nationwide Tour but could not retain his card. In 2013, he finished runner-up at qualifying school for both the Asian Tour and the OneAsia Tour, signalling his intention to play full-time on that continent. In March 2014, Lee won for the first time as a professional on the Asian Tour at the Solaire Open with a one shot victory, having been a runner-up the previous year. In September 2017 he had his second win on the Asian Tour, the Shinhan Donghae Open, an event co-sanctioned with the Korean Tour. A final round 66 gave him a one stroke victory over Gavin Green. In April 2019 Lee won again on the Korean Tour, in the DB Insurance Promy Open.

In 2026, Lee shot rounds of 64, 66, 64 and 65 to win the LIV Golf promotions event in Florida five strokes clear of Björn Hellgren in second, to earn a place on the 2026 LIV Golf League.

== Personal life ==
Lee is now a resident of Chandler, Arizona.

== Professional wins (6) ==
=== Asian Tour wins (3) ===
Legend
International Series (1)
Other Asian Tour (2)

No.	Date	Tournament	Winning score	Margin of victory	Runner(s)-up
1	Mar 16, 2014	Solaire Open	−7 (68-70-70-69=277)	1 stroke	(Thailand) Chawalit Plaphol
2	Sep 17, 2017	Shinhan Donghae Open^{1}	−11 (68-71-68-66=273)	1 stroke	(Malaysia) Gavin Green
3	Nov 3, 2024	BNI Indonesian Masters	−23 (62-67-66-70=265)	4 strokes	(Taiwan) Chang Wei-lun, (Thailand) Phachara Khongwatmai

^{1}Co-sanctioned by the Korean Tour

Asian Tour playoff record (0–1)

No.	Year	Tournament	Opponent	Result
1	2019	Sarawak Championship	(Australia) Andrew Dodt	Lost to birdie on first extra hole

=== Korean Tour wins (4) ===
No.	Date	Tournament	Winning score	Margin of victory	Runner(s)-up
1	Sep 17, 2017	Shinhan Donghae Open^{1}	−11 (68-71-68-66=273)	1 stroke	(Malaysia) Gavin Green
2	Apr 21, 2019	DB Insurance Promy Open	−14 (69-67-68-70=274)	1 stroke	(South Korea) Kim Jae-ho
3	Oct 24, 2021	Hana Bank Invitational	−17 (66-67-64-70=267)	4 strokes	(South Korea) Kim Min-kyu
4	Apr 27, 2025	Woori Financial Group Championship	−5 (69-70-70-70=279)	Playoff	(South Korea) Kang Tae-young, (South Korea) Park Jun-hong

^{1}Co-sanctioned by the Asian Tour

Korean Tour playoff record (1–1)

No.	Year	Tournament	Opponent(s)	Result
1	2025	Woori Financial Group Championship	(South Korea) Kang Tae-young, (South Korea) Park Jun-hong	Won with birdie on first extra hole
2	2025	SK Telecom Open	(South Korea) Eom Jae-woong	Lost to bogey on first extra hole

== Playoff record ==
LIV Golf League playoff record (0–1)

No.	Year	Tournament	Opponent	Result
1	2026	LIV Golf Singapore	(United States) Bryson DeChambeau	Lost to par on first extra hole

== Results in major championships ==
Tournament	2007	2008	2009
U.S. Open	WD		
The Open Championship			

Tournament	2010	2011	2012	2013	2014	2015	2016	2017	2018	2019
U.S. Open										
The Open Championship										

Tournament	2020	2021
U.S. Open		
The Open Championship	NT	CUT

WD = withdrew
NT = No tournament due to COVID-19 pandemic
Note: Lee only played in the U.S. Open and The Open Championship.

== Results in World Golf Championships ==
Tournament	2015
Championship	
Match Play	
Invitational	
Champions	T46

Did not play

"T" = Tied
