= 72 hole tournament =

Type of golf tournament

In the sport of golf a 72 hole tournament, sometimes written as 72-hole tournament is a stroke play competition staged over four days and played over 72 holes. It is the standard format for PGA Tour events. The 72 hole format is the current format for golf at the Summer Olympics
