= Kazuki Higa =

Japanese professional golfer (born 1995)

Personal information
- Nationality: Japan
- Born: 23 April 1995 (age 31) Okinawa, Japan
- Height: 158 cm (5 ft 2 in)
- Weight: 70 kg (154 lb)

Career
- Sport: Golf
- College: Tohoku Fukushi University
- Turned professional: 2017
- Current tours: Japan Golf Tour; Asian Tour
- Former tours: European Tour; Japan Challenge Tour; Asian Development Tour
- Professional wins: 13
- Highest ranking: 67 (8 January 2023) (as of 25 October 2026)

Number of wins by tour
- Japan Golf Tour: 8
- Asian Tour: 3
- Other: 4

Best results in major championships
- Masters Tournament: CUT: 2023
- PGA Championship: T70: 2026
- U.S. Open: DNP
- The Open Championship: T74: 2026

Achievements and awards
- Japan Golf Tour money list winner: 2022
- Japan Golf Tour Most Valuable Player: 2022
- Asian Tour Order of Merit winner: 2025
- Asian Tour Player of the Year: 2025
Medal record
Men's golf
Representing Japan
Asian Games
Silver medal – second place	2026 Aichi–Nagoya	Men's individual
Bronze medal – third place	2026 Aichi–Nagoya	Men's team
Summer Universiade
Gold medal – first place	2015 Gwangju	Men's individual
Gold medal – first place	2015 Gwangju	Men's team
Silver medal – second place	2017 Taipei	Men's individual
Gold medal – first place	2017 Taipei	Men's team

Kazuki Higa (Japanese: 比嘉一貴, born 23 April 1995) is a Japanese professional golfer. He has won eight times on the Japan Golf Tour, as well as topping the money list in 2022. In 2025, he won the Asian Tour Order of Merit.

== Professional career ==
Higa attended Tohoku Fukushi University and turned professional in late 2017. Since turning professional, he has played primarily on the Japan Golf Tour. His first win was at the 2019 RIZAP KBC Augusta. He won again in 2021 at the Shigeo Nagashima Invitational Sega Sammy Cup.

=== 2022: Four wins and money list title ===
Higa started off the season by winning the Kansai Open Golf Championship in April. He also won the BMW Japan Golf Tour Championship Mori Building Cup in June. In September, Higa won the Shinhan Donghae Open, an event also sanctioned by the Asian Tour and the Korean Tour. He shot a final-round 65 to win by two shots. He claimed his fourth victory of the season at the Dunlop Phoenix Tournament in November. He shot a final round 64 to win by three shots ahead of Mito Pereira. Higa ended the 2022 season as the Japan Golf Tour money list winner and earned status to play on the 2023 European Tour.

=== 2025: Asian Tour Order of Merit ===
Higa won on the Asian Tour in back-to-back weeks, winning the Shinhan Donghae Open in South Korea, followed by the Yeangder Tournament Players Championship in Taiwan. He went on to win the 2025 Asian Tour Order of Merit, becoming the first Japanese player to do so.

== Amateur wins ==
- 2017 Neighbors Trophy Team Championship (individual winner), Tohoku Amateur Championship, Kanto Collegiate Championship

== Professional wins (13) ==
=== Japan Golf Tour wins (8) ===
Legend
Japan majors (1)
Other Japan Golf Tour (7)

No.	Date	Tournament	Winning score	Margin of victory	Runner(s)-up
1	1 Sep 2019	RIZAP KBC Augusta	−26 (66-63-67-66=262)	5 strokes	(Japan) Rikuya Hoshino
2	22 Aug 2021	Shigeo Nagashima Invitational Sega Sammy Cup	−20 (68-65-67-68=268)	2 strokes	(Japan) Kunihiro Kamii
3	17 Apr 2022	Kansai Open Golf Championship	−14 (65-67-68-70=270)	1 stroke	(Japan) Rikuya Hoshino
4	5 Jun 2022	BMW Japan Golf Tour Championship Mori Building Cup	−12 (69-71-65-67=272)	1 stroke	(Japan) Tomoharu Otsuki
5	11 Sep 2022	Shinhan Donghae Open^{1}	−20 (66-63-70-65=264)	2 strokes	(South Korea) Cho Min-gyu, (Thailand) Tirawat Kaewsiribandit, (Canada) Shin Yong-gu
6	20 Nov 2022	Dunlop Phoenix Tournament	−21 (69-65-65-64=263)	3 strokes	(Chile) Mito Pereira
7	17 Aug 2025	ISPS Handa Explosion in the Summer	−30 (65-62-66-65=258)	Playoff	(Japan) Ren Yonezawa
8	14 Sep 2025	Shinhan Donghae Open^{1} (2)	−18 (70-67-65-68=270)	1 stroke	(Canada) Richard T. Lee, (Zimbabwe) Scott Vincent

^{1}Co-sanctioned by the Asian Tour and the Korean Tour

Japan Golf Tour playoff record (1–0)

No.	Year	Tournament	Opponent	Result
1	2025	ISPS Handa Explosion in the Summer	(Japan) Ren Yonezawa	Won with eagle on second extra hole

=== Asian Tour wins (3) ===
No.	Date	Tournament	Winning score	Margin of victory	Runners-up
1	11 Sep 2022	Shinhan Donghae Open^{1}	−20 (66-63-70-65=264)	2 strokes	(South Korea) Cho Min-gyu, (Thailand) Tirawat Kaewsiribandit, (Canada) Shin Yong-gu
2	14 Sep 2025	Shinhan Donghae Open^{1} (2)	−18 (70-67-65-68=270)	1 stroke	(Canada) Richard T. Lee, (Zimbabwe) Scott Vincent
3	21 Sep 2025	Yeangder Tournament Players Championship^{2}	−17 (68-67-67-68=271)	2 strokes	(United States) Charles Porter, (Taiwan) Wang Wei-hsuan, (Thailand) Rattanon Wannasrichan

^{1}Co-sanctioned by the Japan Golf Tour and the Korean Tour
^{2}Co-sanctioned by the Taiwan PGA Tour

=== Japan Challenge Tour wins (1) ===
No.	Date	Tournament	Winning score	Margin of victory	Runners-up
1	29 Jun 2018	Minami Akita CC Michinoku Challenge	−12 (66-64=130) (Note: Shortened to 36 holes due to weather.)	2 strokes	(Japan) Yoshikazu Haku, (Japan) Takahiro Hataji, (Japan) Konosuke Nakazato

=== Asian Development Tour wins (2) ===
No.	Date	Tournament	Winning score	Margin of victory	Runner(s)-up
1	27 Apr 2018	BTI Open^{1}	−17 (62-70-69-70=271)	3 strokes	(Bangladesh) Zamal Hossain
2	16 Mar 2019	UMW Championship^{2}	−22 (68-65-68-65=266)	6 strokes	(Japan) Shintaro Kobayashi, (Japan) Naoki Sekito

^{1}Co-sanctioned by the Professional Golf Tour of India
^{2}Co-sanctioned by the Professional Golf of Malaysia Tour

=== Other wins (1) ===
- 2018 Kyusyu Open

== Results in major championships ==
Tournament	2022	2023	2024	2025	2026
Masters Tournament		CUT			
PGA Championship		76			T70
U.S. Open					
The Open Championship	CUT	CUT			T74

Did not play

CUT = missed the half-way cut
"T" = tied

== Team appearances ==
Amateur

- Eisenhower Trophy (representing Japan): 2016
- Neighbors Trophy Team Championship (representing Japan): 2013, 2015, 2017 (winners)
