= Joaquín Niemann =

Chilean professional golfer (born 1998)

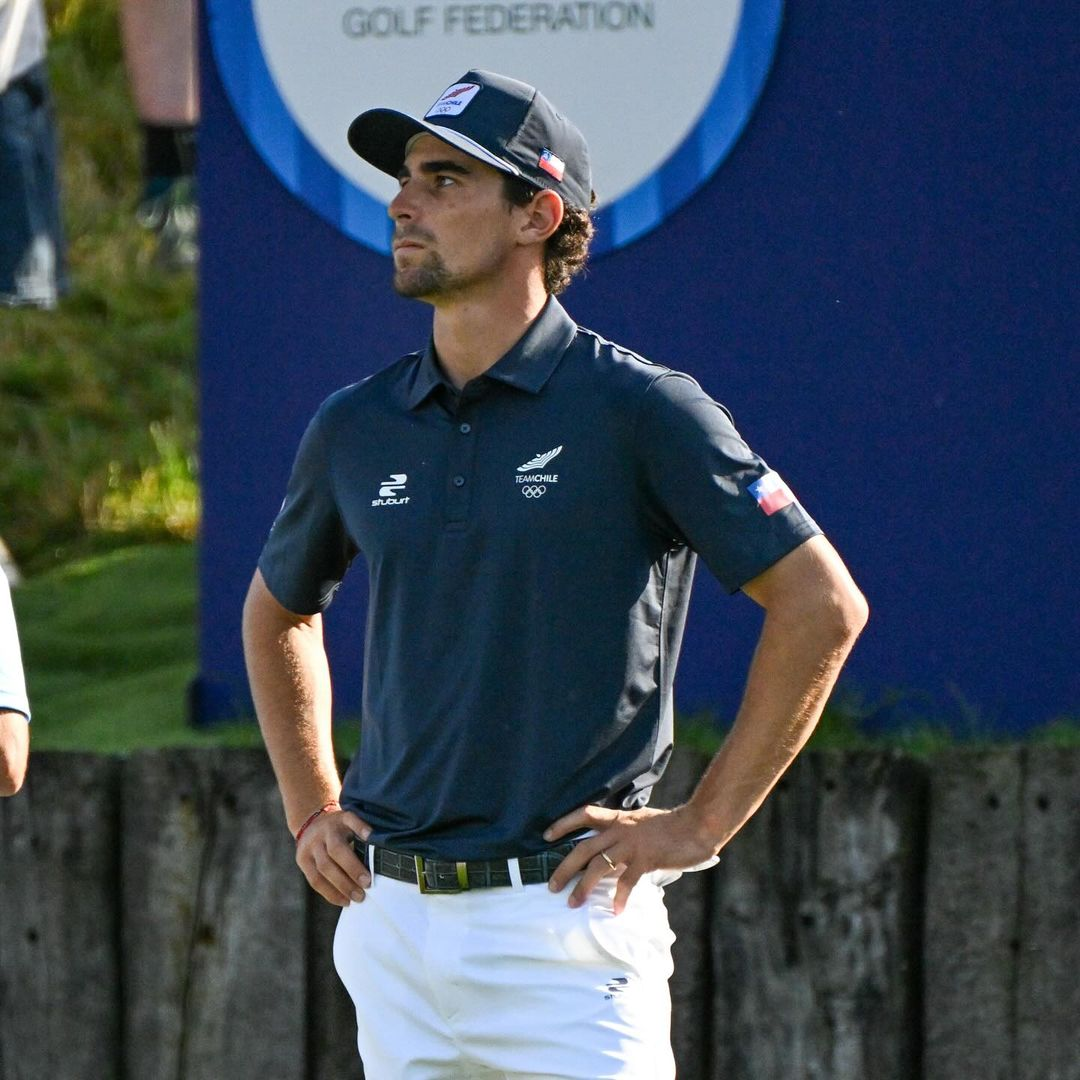
- Niemann at the 2024 Summer Olympics

Personal information
- Full name: Joaquín Niemann Zenteno
- Nickname: Joaco
- Nationality: Chile
- Born: 7 November 1998 (age 27) Santiago, Chile
- Height: 1.83 m (6 ft 0 in)
- Weight: 69 kg (152 lb)

Career
- Sport: Golf
- Turned professional: 2018
- Current tour: LIV Golf
- Former tours: PGA Tour; European Tour; Chilean Tour
- Professional wins: 23
- Highest ranking: 15 (10 April 2022) (as of 1 November 2026)

Number of wins by tour
- PGA Tour: 2
- European Tour: 1
- Asian Tour: 1
- PGA Tour of Australasia: 1
- LIV Golf: 9
- Other: 10

Best results in major championships
- Masters Tournament: T16: 2023
- PGA Championship: T8: 2025
- U.S. Open: T7: 2026
- The Open Championship: T53: 2022

Achievements and awards
- Mark H. McCormack Medal: 2017
- Asian Tour International Series Order of Merit winner: 2024
- LIV Golf League Most Valuable Player: 2025

Joaquín Niemann Zenteno (born 7 November 1998) is a Chilean professional golfer who plays in the LIV Golf League. He won twice on the PGA Tour, before joining LIV Golf in 2022. Prior to turning professional, he held the number one position in the World Amateur Golf Ranking from May 2017 to April 2018.

== Early life ==
Niemann was born in 1998 to Pamela Zenteno and Jorge Niemann. He is of German ancestry. Both of his parents had athletic backgrounds; his father played basketball in college, while his mother played field hockey for the Chilean national team. She represented Chile at the 1989 Women's Hockey Junior World Cup, and retired from the sport after her marriage at age 24. Niemann grew up with three brothers and two sisters, all of whom preferred soccer to golf.

Niemann's father was a recreational golfer and introduced him to the game. Niemann stated in 2021 that he began playing golf "around two or three years-old ... I had three plastic clubs that I would carry around my house all the time." He also played soccer and competed in track and field as a child. During his youth, he was inspired by Spanish golfer Sergio García.

Niemann's parents divorced when he was in eighth grade, and he moved with his father, an engineer, to Santiago, as this was better for his golf development. He earned a scholarship at the prestigious Athletic Study Centre in Santiago, and began to play in international amateur tournaments. Niemann planned to play at the University of South Florida, but he was unable to gain entry as his TOEFL score was too low. He said in 2021 that he never studied at school, "In every class, I just waited for recess. All I ever wanted to do was play professional golf."

== Amateur career ==
Niemann was the number one ranked golfer in the World Amateur Golf Ranking for 44 weeks, from May 2017 to April 2018, when he turned professional. He was awarded the 2017 Mark H. McCormack Medal for being the top-ranked player in the World Amateur Golf Ranking at the conclusion of the summer's championship season, thus gaining entry into the 2018 U.S. Open and into the 2018 Open Championship. He won the 2018 Latin America Amateur Championship, gaining entry also into the 2018 Masters Tournament.

== Professional career ==
=== PGA Tour ===
After competing in the 2018 Masters Tournament as an amateur, Niemann turned professional, thus forfeiting his exemptions to the 2018 U.S. Open and Open Championship. In his first professional start, at the 2018 Valero Texas Open, he finished 6th. He earned Special Temporary Member Status on the PGA Tour for the rest of 2018 with a tied-6th finish at the Memorial Tournament, his third top-ten in only five starts on tour. He earned a PGA Tour card for the 2018–19 season, after a fourth top-10 finish (T5 at The Greenbrier) in eight tournaments. Niemann joined Jordan Spieth (2013) and Jon Rahm (2016) as golfers who were able to completely bypass the Web.com Tour Finals and earn PGA Tour cards after starting the season without any status.

In September 2019, Niemann won A Military Tribute at The Greenbrier for his first PGA Tour victory. He became the first PGA Tour winner from Chile, and the youngest international PGA Tour winner since 1923.

In December 2019, Niemann played on the International team at the 2019 Presidents Cup at Royal Melbourne Golf Club in Australia. The U.S. team won 16–14. Niemann went 0–3–1 and lost his Sunday singles match against Patrick Cantlay.

In January 2021, Niemann shot a final round 64 at the Sentry Tournament of Champions. He joined Harris English in a playoff, but was defeated on the first extra hole. A week later, he finished T2 at the Sony Open in Hawaii; one stroke behind Kevin Na.

In July 2021, Niemann shot a bogey free 18-under par for 72 holes to tie with Cameron Davis and Troy Merritt for the lead at the Rocket Mortgage Classic. Niemann made his first bogey of the week on the first playoff hole and was eliminated. Davis was the eventual champion.

In February 2022, Niemann shot rounds of 63-63-68-71, to win the Genesis Invitational hosted by Tiger Woods. He finished the tournament at 19-under par, two strokes ahead of Collin Morikawa and Cameron Young.

=== LIV Golf ===
In August 2022, it was announced that Niemann had joined LIV Golf. He was subsequently named as the captain of the Torque GC team and finished runner-up in his first start, at LIV Golf Invitational Boston, losing a playoff to Dustin Johnson. In the 2023 LIV Golf League, his all Spanish-speaking Torque GC won more team titles (four) and collected more prize money than any other team during the regular season, before finishing 3rd in the $50 million Team Championship in Miami.

In December 2023, Niemann won the ISPS Handa Australian Open, a tournament co-sanctioned by the European Tour and PGA Tour of Australasia, at The Australian Golf Club in Sydney. He defeated Rikuya Hoshino in a sudden-death playoff.

On 4 February 2024, Niemann shot a 12-under-par 59 in the first round of the LIV Golf Mayakoba in Mexico. According to Data Golf, it was the third-best score in terms of true strokes gained since 2004. In a playoff against Sergio García, Niemann won the tournament with a birdie on the fourth extra hole, for his first individual LIV Golf title.

Hole	1	2	3	4	5	6	7	8	9	Out	10	11	12	13	14	15	16	17	18	In	Total
Par	4	4	4	3	5	4	5	3	4	36	3	4	4	5	4	3	4	4	4	35	71
Score	4	4	3	2	4	3	4	3	3	30	2	2	4	4	4	2	4	3	4	29	59

In an interview following his win at LIV Golf Mayakoba, Niemann stated his desire to win major championships, but lamented that "I've got to get in first". Three weeks later, Augusta National Golf Club announced that Niemann was given a special invitation to compete in the 2024 Masters Tournament.

In December 2024, Niemann won the season-ending PIF Saudi International on the Asian Tour, beating Cameron Smith and Caleb Surratt in a playoff. The win also saw him win the International Series Order of Merit.

Niemann recorded five victories during the 2025 LIV Golf League season. In May 2026, he shot a final-round 67 to enter a playoff at LIV Golf Korea against Talor Gooch. Niemann birdied the first playoff hole to win the event, which was his eighth career LIV Golf title.

At the 2026 U.S. Open held at Shinnecock Hills Golf Club, Niemann made a septuple-bogey 11 on the par-4 6th hole as part of a first-round 78. This hole included two out-of-bounds tee shots and a two-stroke penalty for throwing a club in frustration. He rallied with a 65 in the second round to make the cut, and shot a 66 in the final round to finish in a tie for seventh at 1-over 281, five strokes behind the winner Wyndham Clark. When asked about his chances in the tournament if he had not made an 11, Niemann said: "If my grandmother had tires, she'd be a car."

== Personal life ==
In October 2020, Niemann's cousin Rafita Calderon was born, and soon was discovered to have spinal muscular atrophy, a rare, life-threatening genetic disorder. To address the disorder, he required Zolgensma, a medical treatment which cost US$2.1 million. As Chile's healthcare system did not cover the treatment, Niemann donated $152,450 from his tournament earnings in November and attempted to bring awareness to the fundraising effort. He stated in February 2021 that Rafita had received the treatment and his condition had improved. Niemann thanked other golfers and companies for helping to meet the fundraising goal.

Niemann married architect Christina Hellema in September 2023 in La Serena, Chile, after more than six years of dating.

== Amateur wins ==
- 2013 Campeonato Sudamericano Pre Juvenil, Campeonato Abierto de Golf de Temuco
- 2015 Junior Orange Bowl Championship, Abierto Las Brisas de Santo Domingo, IMG Academy Junior World Championships (Boys 15–17), Campeonato Juvenil de Chile, Canadian International Junior Challenge, Abierto Sport Francés
- 2016 Campeonato Sudamericano Juvenil, Junior Golf World Cup, IMG Academy Junior World Championships (Boys 15–17), Campeonato Juvenil de Chile, Abierto Prince of Wales Country Club, Abierto Sport Francés
- 2017 Abierto Las Araucarias, TaylorMade-Adidas Golf Junior at Innisbrook, Junior Invitational at Sage Valley, Campeonato Internacional de Aficionados - Mexico
- 2018 Latin America Amateur Championship

== Professional wins (23) ==
=== PGA Tour wins (2) ===
No.	Date	Tournament	Winning score	To par	Margin of victory	Runner(s)-up
1	15 Sep 2019	A Military Tribute at The Greenbrier	65-62-68-64=259	−21	6 strokes	(United States) Tom Hoge
2	20 Feb 2022	Genesis Invitational	63-63-68-71=265	−19	2 strokes	(United States) Collin Morikawa, (United States) Cameron Young

PGA Tour playoff record (0–2)

No.	Year	Tournament	Opponent(s)	Result
1	2021	Sentry Tournament of Champions	(United States) Harris English	Lost to birdie on first extra hole
2	2021	Rocket Mortgage Classic	(Australia) Cameron Davis, (United States) Troy Merritt	Davis won with par on fifth extra hole Niemann eliminated by par on first hole

=== European Tour wins (1) ===
No.	Date	Tournament	Winning score	To par	Margin of victory	Runner-up
1	3 Dec 2023 (2024 season)	ISPS Handa Australian Open^{1}	66-69-70-66=271	−14	Playoff	(Japan) Rikuya Hoshino

^{1}Co-sanctioned by the PGA Tour of Australasia

European Tour playoff record (1–0)

No.	Year	Tournament	Opponent	Result
1	2023	ISPS Handa Australian Open	(Japan) Rikuya Hoshino	Won with eagle on second extra hole

=== Asian Tour wins (1) ===
Legend
International Series (1)
Other Asian Tour (0)

No.	Date	Tournament	Winning score	To par	Margin of victory	Runners-up
1	7 Dec 2024	PIF Saudi International	65-66-65-67=263	−21	Playoff	(Australia) Cameron Smith, (United States) Caleb Surratt

Asian Tour playoff record (1–0)

No.	Year	Tournament	Opponents	Result
1	2024	PIF Saudi International	(Australia) Cameron Smith, (United States) Caleb Surratt	Won with birdie on second extra hole

=== Chilean Tour wins (10) ===
No.	Date	Tournament	Winning score	To par	Margin of victory	Runner(s)-up
1	30 Nov 2015	Abierto del Club de Polo y Equitación San Cristóbal (as an amateur)	67-76-72=215	−1	Playoff	(Chile) Benjamín Alvarado, (Chile) Cristián León
2	13 Nov 2016	Abierto Las Brisas de Santo Domingo (as an amateur)	68-68-73=209	−7	1 stroke	(Chile) Juan Cerda, (Chile) Hugo León
3	29 Jan 2017	Abierto de Granadilla (as an amateur)	66-64-70-72=272	−16	5 strokes	(Chile) Antonio Costa
4	26 Mar 2017	Abierto Los Lirios (as an amateur)	67-67-67-69=270	−18	9 strokes	(Chile) Luis Figueroa
5	10 Sep 2017	Abierto Las Brisas de Chicureo (as an amateur)	66-69-68=203	−13	1 stroke	(Chile) Juan Cerda
6	16 Dec 2017	Abierto del Club de Polo y Equitación San Cristóbal (2) (as an amateur)	66-65-70=201	−15	Playoff	(Chile) Mito Pereira
7	11 Mar 2018	Abierto La Dehesa (as an amateur)	64-69-68=201	−15	5 strokes	(Chile) Matías Calderón, (Argentina) Ignacio Marino
8	2 Dec 2018	Abierto Los Leones	63-68-66-66=263	−25	14 strokes	(Chile) Mito Pereira
9	18 Dec 2021	Abierto del Club de Polo y Equitación San Cristóbal (3)	65-71-65=201	−15	5 strokes	(Brazil) Rodrigo Lee
10	4 Oct 2026	Scotiabank Abierto de Chile	64-73-69-67=273	−15	4 strokes	(Chile) Gabriel Morgan-Birke

=== LIV Golf League wins (9) ===
No.	Date	Tournament	Winning score	To par	Margin of victory	Runner(s)-up
1	4 Feb 2024	LIV Golf Mayakoba	59-72-70=201	−12	Playoff	(Spain) Sergio García
2	3 Mar 2024	LIV Golf Jeddah	63-64-66=193	−17	4 strokes	(South Africa) Louis Oosthuizen, (South Africa) Charl Schwartzel
3	16 Feb 2025	LIV Golf Adelaide	67-71-65=203	−13	3 strokes	(Mexico) Abraham Ancer, (Mexico) Carlos Ortiz
4	16 Mar 2025	LIV Golf Singapore	67-64-65=196	−17	5 strokes	(United States) Brooks Koepka
5	27 Apr 2025	LIV Golf Mexico City (2)	68-64-65=197	−16	3 strokes	(United States) Bryson DeChambeau, (Australia) Lucas Herbert
6	8 Jun 2025	LIV Golf Virginia	68-69-64=201	−15	1 stroke	(India) Anirban Lahiri, (Northern Ireland) Graeme McDowell
7	27 Jul 2025	LIV Golf UK	65-63-68=196	−17	3 strokes	(United States) Bubba Watson
8	31 May 2026	LIV Golf Korea	66-69-66-67=268	−12	Playoff	(United States) Talor Gooch
9	9 Aug 2026	LIV Golf New York	64-65-70-69=268	−16	3 strokes	(United States) Harold Varner III

LIV Golf League playoff record (2–1)

No.	Year	Tournament	Opponent(s)	Result
1	2022	LIV Golf Invitational Boston	(United States) Dustin Johnson, (India) Anirban Lahiri	Johnson won with eagle on first extra hole
2	2024	LIV Golf Mayakoba	(Spain) Sergio García	Won with birdie on fourth extra hole
3	2026	LIV Golf Korea	(United States) Talor Gooch	Won with birdie on first extra hole

== Results in major championships ==
Results not in chronological order in 2020.

Tournament	2017	2018
Masters Tournament		CUT
U.S. Open	CUT	
The Open Championship		
PGA Championship		T71

Tournament	2019	2020	2021	2022	2023	2024	2025	2026
Masters Tournament			T40	T35	T16	T22	T29	
PGA Championship	CUT	CUT	T30	T23	CUT	T39	T8	T18
U.S. Open		T23	T31	T47	T32		CUT	T7
The Open Championship	CUT	NT	T59	T53	CUT	T58	CUT	CUT

Top 10
Did not play

CUT = missed the half-way cut
"T" = tied
NT = no tournament due to COVID-19 pandemic

=== Summary ===
Tournament	Wins	2nd	3rd	Top-5	Top-10	Top-25	Events	Cuts made
Masters Tournament	0	0	0	0	0	2	6	5
PGA Championship	0	0	0	0	1	3	9	6
U.S. Open	0	0	0	0	1	2	7	5
The Open Championship	0	0	0	0	0	0	7	3
Totals	0	0	0	0	2	7	29	19

- Most consecutive cuts made – 10 (2020 U.S. Open – 2023 Masters)
- Longest streak of top-10s – 1 (twice)

== Results in The Players Championship ==
Tournament	2021	2022
The Players Championship	T29	T22

"T" indicates a tie for a place

== Results in World Golf Championships ==
Tournament	2020	2021	2022
Championship		T28	
Match Play	NT^{1}	T18	T35
Invitational	T52	T17	
Champions	NT^{1}	NT^{1}	NT^{1}

^{1}Cancelled due to COVID-19 pandemic

Did not play

"T" = Tied
NT = No tournament
Note that the Championship and Invitational were discontinued from 2022.

== PGA Tour career summary ==
Season	Starts	Cuts made	Wins	2nd	3rd	Top-10	Top-25	Best finish	Earnings ($)	Money list rank
2017	2	1	0	0	0	0	0	T29	n/a^{[a]}	n/a
2018	13	9	0	0	0	4	6	T5	n/a^{[a]}	n/a
2019	28	21	0	0	0	4	6	T5	1,434,519	79
2020	23	15	1	0	1	4	5	1	2,914,136	19
2021	27	26	0	3	0	5	13	2	3,936,912	26
2022	23	18	1	0	1	5	11	1	5,076,060	26
Career*	116	90	2	3	2	22	41	1	14,571,584	141

^{a} Niemann was an amateur through the 2018 Masters Tournament.

== Team appearances ==
Amateur

- Eisenhower Trophy (representing Chile): 2016

Professional

- Presidents Cup (representing the International team): 2019

== See also ==
- Lowest rounds of golf
