= Caleb Surratt =

American professional golfer (born 2004)

Personal information
- Nationality: United States
- Born: March 16, 2004 (age 22) Indian Trail, North Carolina, U.S.

Career
- Sport: Golf
- College: University of Tennessee
- Turned professional: 2024
- Current tour: LIV Golf

Best results in major championships
- Masters Tournament: DNP
- PGA Championship: DNP
- U.S. Open: T63: 2026
- The Open Championship: CUT: 2026

Achievements and awards
- SEC Freshman of the Year: 2023

Caleb Surratt (born March 16, 2004) is an American professional golfer who plays on the LIV Golf League.

== Early life and family ==
Surratt hails from Indian Trail, North Carolina, a suburb of Charlotte. His father, Brent, was a professional long drive player.

== Amateur career ==
In 2021, Surratt won the Terra Cotta Invitational, Junior PGA Championship, Bobby Chapman Invitational and Western Junior. He was ranked as the No. 2 player in the country by Junior Golf Scoreboard, and named Rolex Junior First Team All-American. He was a member of the U.S. team for the 2021 Junior Ryder Cup, which was cancelled due to the COVID-19 pandemic.

In 2022, Surratt earned an exemption into the PGA Tour's Butterfield Bermuda Championship by coming in first in the Elite Amateur Cup, and made the cut after a second round of 64. He lost the final of the U.S. Junior Amateur at Bandon Dunes Golf Resort 3 and 2 to Ding Wenyi of China. By July, Data Golf ranked him as the top amateur in the world.

Surratt joined the Tennessee Volunteers men's golf team at the University of Tennessee in the fall of 2022. He was named SEC Freshman of the Year and First Team All-American after he won the 2023 SEC Championship individual title, as the first freshman since Justin Thomas in 2012.

He represented the United States at the 2023 Arnold Palmer Cup and the 2023 Walker Cup, where he won three of his four matches at the Old Course at St Andrews to help Team USA to a 14 1/2–11 1/2 victory over Great Britain and Ireland.

== Professional career ==
On January 30, 2024, LIV Golf announced that Surratt had turned professional and joined Legion XIII captained by Jon Rahm. He made his debut on February 2, 2024, at LIV Golf Mayakoba where he finished tied for 13th and his Legion VIII team won the team title. He followed up with a tied-12th finish in the second event in Las Vegas, which would be his highest finish of the season. Away from LIV, he recorded top-3 finishes in all three appearances on the Asian Tour International Series during 2024.

== Amateur wins ==
- 2021 Terra Cotta Invitational, Western Junior, Junior PGA Championship, Bobby Chapman Invitational
- 2022 Junior Invitational at Sage Valley, Terra Cotta Invitational, Maui Jim Intercollegiate
- 2023 SEC Championship

== Playoff record ==
Asian Tour playoff record (0–1)

No.	Year	Tournament	Opponents	Result
1	2024	PIF Saudi International	(Chile) Joaquín Niemann, (Australia) Cameron Smith	Niemann won with birdie on second extra hole

== Results in major championships ==
Tournament	2026
Masters Tournament	
PGA Championship	
U.S. Open	T63
The Open Championship	CUT

Did not play

CUT = missed the half-way cut
T = tied

== U.S. national team appearances ==
- Arnold Palmer Cup: 2023
- Walker Cup: 2023
