= LIV Golf =

Professional golf league (2022–2026)

- Sport: Golf
- Founded: 2021
- First season: 2022
- Folded: 2026
- Owner: Public Investment Fund of Saudi Arabia
- CEO: Scott O'Neil
- Countries: Based internationally
- Most titles: Points list titles: (Spain) Jon Rahm (3); Tournament wins: (Chile) Joaquín Niemann (9)
- Broadcasters: The CW (United States, 2023–2024); Fox (United States, 2025–2026); Seven Network (Australia); ITV (United Kingdom, 2025); TVNZ+ (New Zealand, 2025–2026); TNT Sports (United Kingdom and Ireland, 2026); LIV GOLF+ (Worldwide)
- Website: www.livgolf.com

LIV Golf (/lɪv/ LIV) was a professional golf tour that operated from 2022 to 2026. The name "LIV" referred to the Roman numeral 54, the number of holes that were originally played at LIV events (this was changed to 72 in the 2026 season). The first LIV Golf Invitational Series event started on 9 June 2022, at the Centurion Club in England. The Invitational Series became the LIV Golf League in 2023.

LIV Golf was financed by the Public Investment Fund (PIF), the sovereign wealth fund of Saudi Arabia. The tour was negatively viewed as being part of an effort by the Saudi monarchy, which has been criticized for its corruption and human rights abuses, to improve its public image through sports. In the inaugural 2022 season, LIV Golf signed numerous high-profile players, such as Phil Mickelson, Dustin Johnson, Brooks Koepka, Sergio García and Bryson DeChambeau. This created conflict with both the PGA Tour and European Tour, which issued penalties against players who joined LIV Golf. The acquisition of reigning Masters champion Jon Rahm in 2023 was the last major signing by the league.

Although LIV Golf hosted many successful golf events worldwide, the organization itself was a financial failure. The PIF withdrew funding for LIV Golf in April 2026 and the league filed for bankruptcy in September 2026. Plans for LIV Golf to continue with funding from BC Partners were unveiled, but in November 2026 they were withdrawn as several players left and the tour folded as a result.

LIV Golf held events across North America, Europe, Asia, Africa and Oceania. LIV Golf Adelaide was awarded the best golf event in the world from 2023 to 2025 at the World Golf Awards.

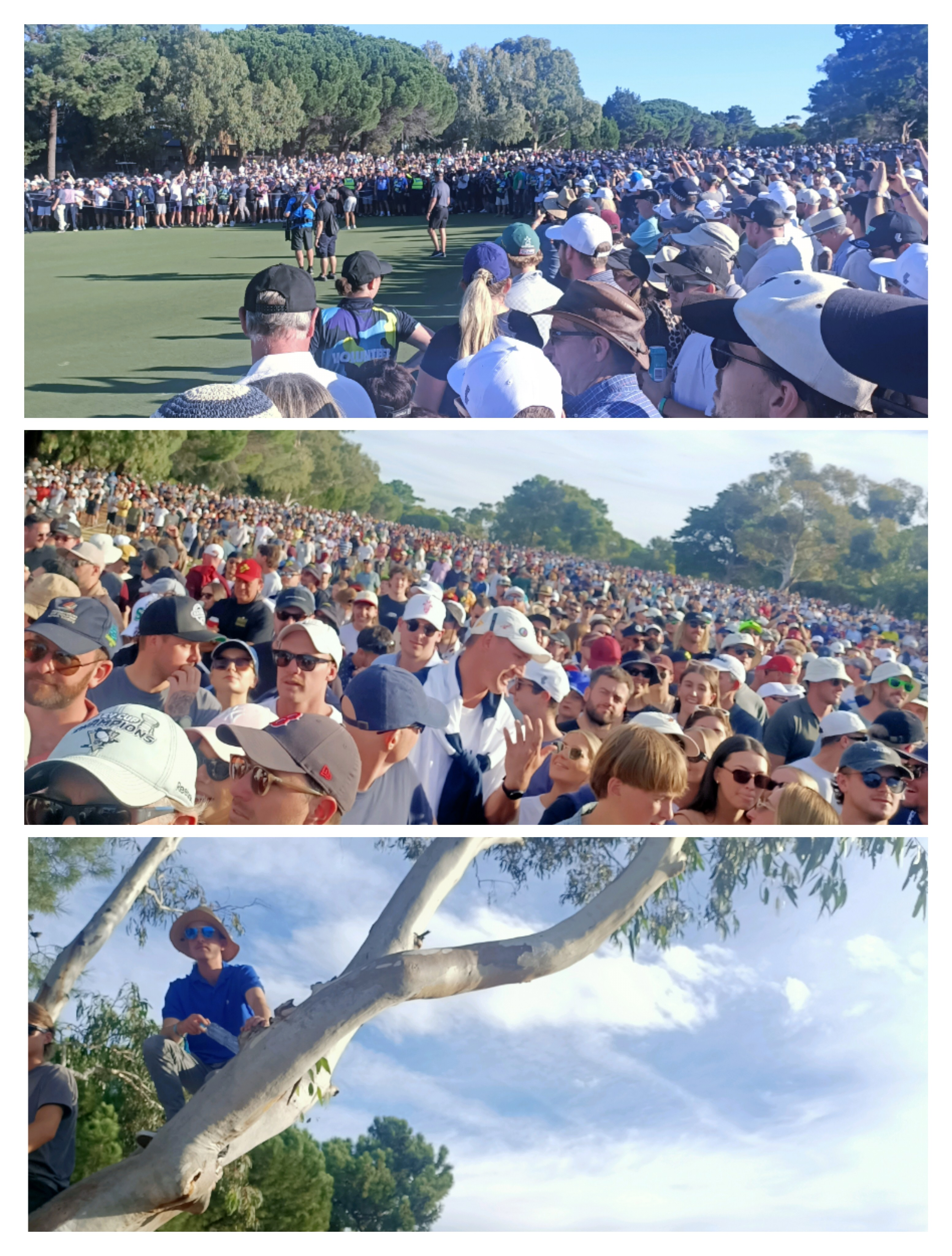
LIV Golf Adelaide patrons

== Organization ==
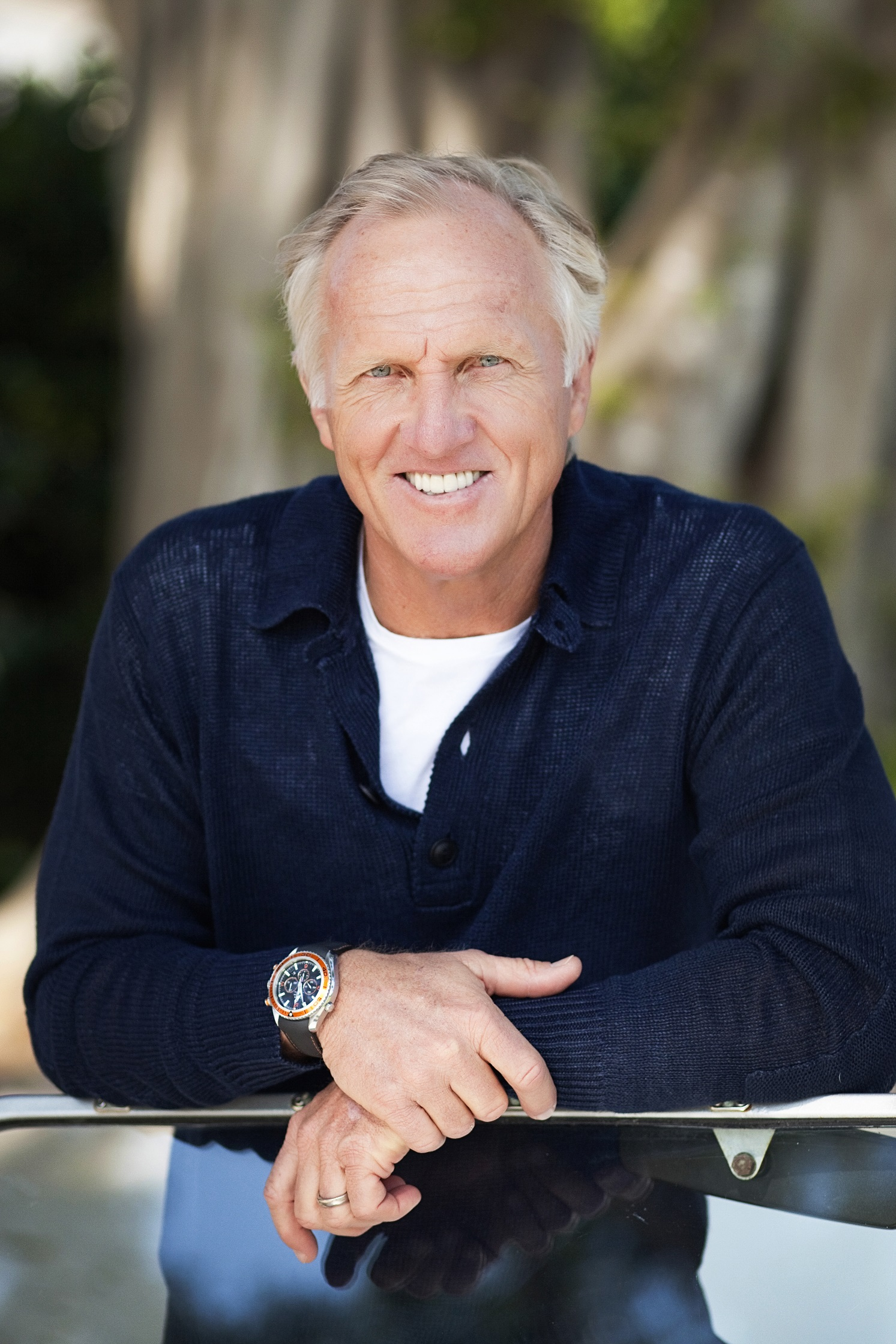
Greg Norman, chief executive officer of LIV Golf from 2021 to 2025

The early framework for a new golf tour to rival the PGA Tour became public in 2019 with announcement of a league to be known as the Premier Golf League. PGA Tour commissioner Jay Monahan responded by implying that golfers who choose to play in a new league would be barred from PGA Tour events. Later in 2020, the PGA European Tour and the PGA Tour formed a "strategic alliance" to work together on commercial opportunities, scheduling, and prize funds for each tour's membership.

The Premier Golf League held talks with Saudi investors about a financial partnership, but Golf Saudi (a division of the Public Investment Fund) instead funded a new entity in 2020 which had its own plan to establish a global professional league, often referred to as the "Super Golf League". This entity formally launched in October 2021 as LIV Golf Investments, with former professional golfer Greg Norman named as CEO.

LIV Golf has often been described as the golfing equivalent to the dormant breakaway European Super League in football. This was not Norman's first attempt at such a breakaway, as Norman had previously partnered with Fox Sports in 1994 on a proposed circuit known as the World Golf Tour, which would have consisted of eight international tournaments open to top players on the Official World Golf Ranking (OWGR). The announcement had faced a mixed response for the lack of concrete detail in Norman's plans, while the US Federal Trade Commission (FTC) voted against ruling on PGA Tour policies requiring waivers for players to participate in other events that conflict with PGA Tour events.

In July 2022, LIV Golf formally applied to be included in the OWGR, a process which typically takes between a year and two years from application submission to approval and awarding of OWGR points. In October 2022, LIV Golf entered into a "strategic alliance" with the MENA Tour. The arrangement was conceived in order to immediately afford LIV Golf events ranking points; however, it was subsequently confirmed that events in 2022 would not receive points as changes to the MENA Tour would need to be reviewed. In a March 2024 letter to players, the league's CEO, Greg Norman, advised that LIV would no longer pursue its bid for world ranking points, a policy which was reversed in November 2025.

On 15 January 2025, it was announced that Scott O'Neil would replace Greg Norman as CEO, effective on that day. Norman's contract with LIV Golf, however, continued until August 2025, after which he had no remaining formal duties. In September 2025, he confirmed that he was stepping away from the organization entirely, ending his four-year association with the league since its launch in 2021.

=== League structure ===
The inaugural season of the LIV Golf Invitational Series featured eight 54-hole no-cut stroke play tournaments and a final Team Championship, set to be a "seeded four-day, four-round, match play knock-out" event held at Trump National Doral Miami in October 2022.

In June 2022, it was reported that LIV Golf would evolve the following year into a league format with a 14-event schedule and 48 contracted players. On 27 July 2022, Norman announced that LIV Golf would implement a promotion and relegation system, featuring a rankings list and a four-player relegation out of the 48 contracted players. The league had a prize fund of $405 million. Its events were scheduled to avoid conflicting with major championships, the PGA Tour's premier tournaments, and international team events.

LIV Golf had 13 team franchises from around the world with their own colours, logo, name and regional identity which gathered sponsors and supporter bases. Twelve of the 13 teams were formed when the league launched, while the thirteenth, Legion XIII, was created following the league's expansion to 54 player fields in 2024. Several of the teams had name changes throughout LIV's run in order to cater to regional identities. When Cameron Smith joined the league in August 2022, for example, his team, the Punch GC, was renamed to Ripper GC in time for the 2023 season. Elsewhere, the Smash GC renamed to OKGC in the middle of the 2026 season in order to cater to the Oklahoma market, aided by Oklahoma native Talor Gooch's captaincy of the team.

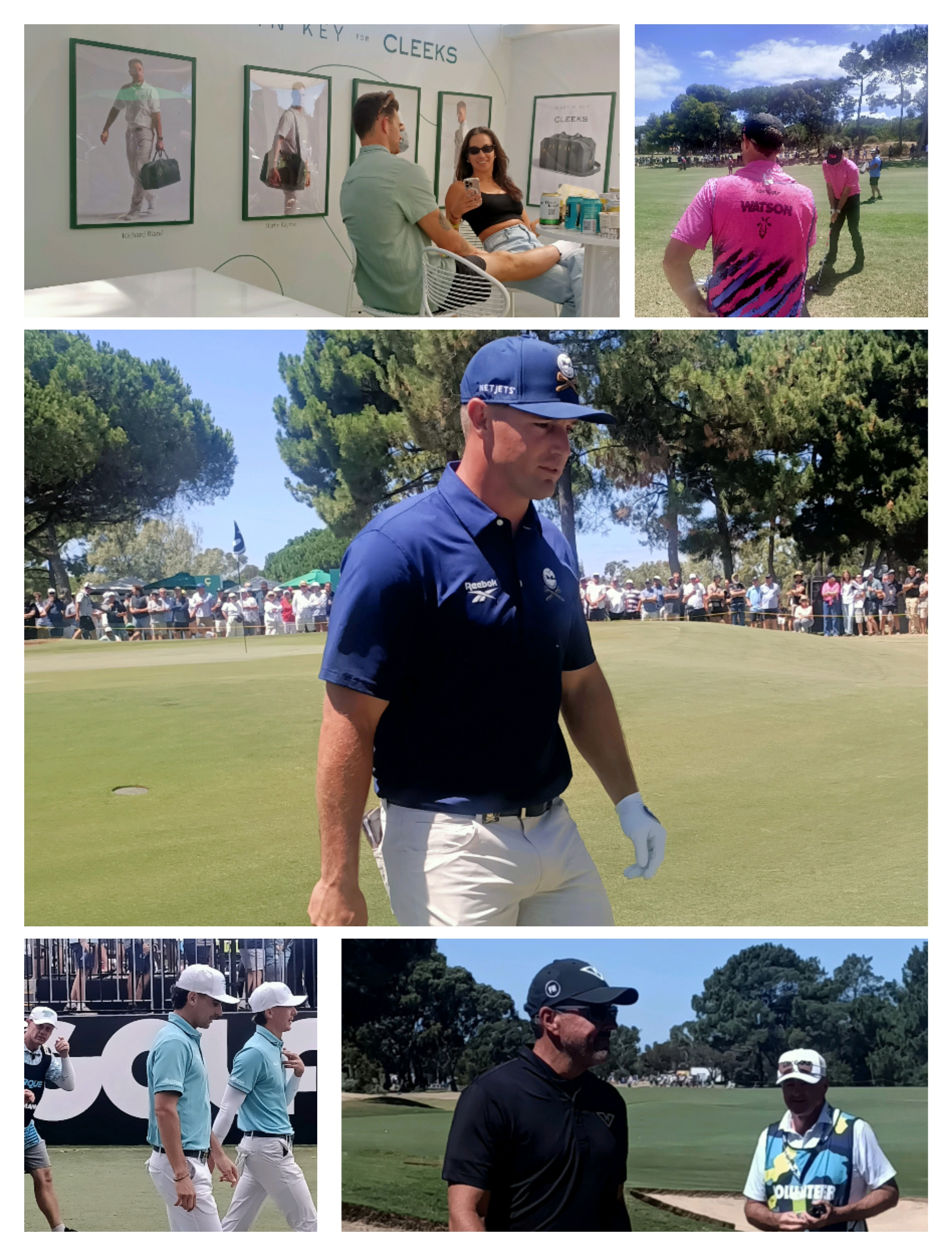
A sample of LIV Golf team colours and identity

In November 2025, LIV Golf announced that beginning with the 2026 season its regular-season tournaments would transition from the traditional 54-hole (three-round) format to 72 holes (four rounds). The change retained the league's shotgun-start scheduling and concurrent individual-and-team competition, and reflects a broader effort to align tournament structure with established professional golf tours and improve the league's eligibility for Official World Golf Ranking consideration.

In February 2026, the OWGR approved LIV's application for ranking points, but only the top ten plus ties would receive world ranking points.

In September 2026, LIV Golf filed for Chapter 11 bankruptcy protection, indicating that it had assets between $100 million and $500 million and liabilities between $500 million and $1 billion, in addition to owing millions in debt to several of its players. The British investment firm BC Partners was slated to provide a $300 million cash injection to keep the league afloat in time for the 2027 season on the condition that most of the top players remained with the tour. The proposed "LIV 2.0" would've reduced the number of events held per year to 10 and expand the overall field at each tournament to 75 players with a 54-hole cut, as well as give each player an equity stake in the league. However, several stars, including Jon Rahm and Sergio García, indicated that they would leave LIV Golf following the proposal. On 4 November, it was reported that BC Partners would pull out of their agreement to finance the tour, which was confirmed in bankruptcy hearings on 5 November, leaving LIV Golf to liquidate its assets.

Prior to LIV's bankruptcy, LIV Golf Adelaide was locked into the schedule until 2031, with a move to a Greg Norman designed championship course specifically designed for LIV Golf on the historic North Adelaide Golf Course confirmed and paid for by the Government of South Australia.

== Player signups ==
On 1 June 2022, the field was released for the first event, to be played at the Centurion Club. The list included former world number ones Dustin Johnson, Martin Kaymer and Lee Westwood, as well as former major champions Sergio García, Graeme McDowell, Louis Oosthuizen, and Charl Schwartzel. One source said Johnson – winner of two major championships and a former World No. 1 – was paid US$150 million to play in the LIV series. Johnson, who had won 24 PGA events and $74 million since 2008, announced his resignation from the PGA Tour on 7 June 2022, saying, "I chose what's best for me and my family." Ian Poulter was reportedly offered £22 million (US$30 million) to join the league. Lee Westwood said that he had signed a non-disclosure agreement relating to the topic.

On 4 June 2022, Kevin Na became the first member of the PGA Tour to resign to participate in LIV Golf, saying, "If I exercise my right to choose where and when I play golf, then I cannot remain a PGA Tour player without facing disciplinary proceedings and legal action from the PGA Tour.... I hope the current policies change and I'll be able to play on the PGA Tour again." Reigning U.S. Amateur champion James Piot, who turned professional in May 2022, chose to play in the first LIV Golf tournament without having joined the PGA Tour.

In a Washington Post interview published on 5 June 2022, LIV Golf CEO Greg Norman said that Tiger Woods had declined to join, turning down a deal that was "mind-blowingly enormous; we're talking about high nine digits."

Before the second event in Portland, LIV Golf announced further signings, including several players in the top-50 of the world rankings, and three more major champions: Bryson DeChambeau, Brooks Koepka, and Patrick Reed. During that event, it was announced that Paul Casey would play in the third event in Bedminster. Further signings before Bedminster included European Ryder Cup captain Henrik Stenson, who was removed from the role before the move was announced. In August 2022, before the fourth event in Boston, LIV Golf announced that six more players had joined, including Open champion and world number two Cameron Smith and Chilean world number 19 Joaquín Niemann.

After 2022, LIV Golf continued recruiting new players for its golf league. Before the 2023 LIV Golf League, Danny Lee, Thomas Pieters, Mito Pereira, and Sebastian Munoz were among the players who joined the circuit. No new signings were announced during the 2023 season. In December 2023, reigning Masters champion Jon Rahm signed with LIV Golf and was given ownership in a new expansion team, later named Legion XIII. To fill his team, Rahm signed Tyrrell Hatton and Caleb Surratt to LIV Golf, along with adding Kieran Vincent, who gained membership via the 2023 LIV Golf Promotions event.

== Reaction ==
LIV Golf was financed by the Public Investment Fund, the sovereign wealth fund of Saudi Arabia. Some journalists and commentators have said the tour was part of efforts by the Saudi monarchy, which has been criticized for its corruption and human rights abuses, to improve its public image through sports.

Human rights groups have criticized LIV Golf as sportswashing, a political strategy by Saudi Arabia to cleanse its repressive global image through sport. Human Rights Watch called the Saudi endeavour "an effort to distract from its serious human rights abuses by taking over events that celebrate human achievement".

Greg Norman has been accused of aiding the repressive Saudi government for his own financial gain. In 2021, Norman denied that he was being used for sportswashing and said he works for LIV because of his passion for the sport. Later, in May 2022, Norman defended the involvement of Saudi Crown Prince Mohammed bin Salman with Jamal Khashoggi's murder, saying, "Look, we've all made mistakes, and you just want to learn from those mistakes and how you can correct them going forward." His statement drew extensive criticism. Khashoggi's fiancée, Hatice Cengiz, said it was hurtful that "Jamal's brutal killing is brushed off as a 'mistake' and that we should just move on".

On 22 June 2022, a group of nearly 2,500 survivors of family members killed or injured during the September 11 attacks wrote an open letter to golfers who have remained loyal to the PGA Tour thanking them for not defecting to LIV Golf. The letter read in part, "Thank you for standing up for decency. Thank you for standing up for the 9/11 Families. Thank you for resisting the Kingdom of Saudi Arabia's efforts to cleanse its reputation by buying off professional athletes...To those of you who have chosen what is right over blood money from a corrupt, destructive sports entity and its Saudi backers, please continue to stand strong." On 17 July 2022, a group of 11 September victims' family members condemned former US president Donald Trump for hosting the LIV Golf tour at his Trump National Golf Club in Bedminster, New Jersey; the group's letter to Trump noted that he himself had blamed Saudi Arabia for the 9/11 attack during a 2016 interview on Fox News.

Tiger Woods, who turned down an offer of $700 million to $800 million to join LIV Golf, was asked in July 2022 about the golfers who had joined. "I disagree with it. I think that what they've done is they've turned their back on what has allowed them to get to this position," Woods said at a press conference before the 2022 Open Championship. "I know what the PGA Tour stands for and what we have done and what the tour has given us, the ability to chase after our careers and to earn what we get and the trophies we have been able to play for and the history that has been a part of this game."

=== PGA Tour ===
The PGA Tour announced that its members who participate in LIV Golf events could be sanctioned for playing in a conflicting event without the Tour's permission, which could result in fines, suspensions, or bans. On 9 June 2022, the PGA Tour announced that its members participating in the first LIV Golf tournament (including current members as well as those who had recently resigned) were no longer eligible to compete in tour events or the Presidents Cup. By contrast, the constitution of the European Tour does not provide for banning players who enter conflicting events.

On 11 July 2022, The Wall Street Journal reported that the United States Department of Justice was investigating the PGA Tour to determine if they have engaged in anti-competitive behavior with LIV Golf. In August 2022, LIV Golf and several players brought an antitrust civil suit against the PGA Tour, which countersued that LIV Golf was encouraging PGA players to break their existing contracts. Jury selection for the upcoming trial was scheduled to take place in January 2024.

In September 2022, Sports Illustrated reported that the PGA Tour had sent letters to Japan Golf Tour members notifying them that the PGA Tour would exclude LIV Golf players from their co-sanctioned events, such as the Zozo Championship, even if they were not members of the PGA Tour. Sports Illustrated speculated that the letters were the reason that all four Japanese players who had played in earlier events had withdrawn from the series prior to the fourth event in Boston, reporting that the letters had been sent to PGA Tour members who had joined LIV Golf but not resigned their membership of the PGA Tour advising them that their membership would "not be renewed for the 2022–23 season".

=== European Tour ===
In June 2022, the PGA and European tours announced a strengthening of their "strategic alliance", with the PGA Tour increasing their stake in European Tour Productions to 40% and further changes being made to the European Tour, including increased prize funds and leading players in the DP World Tour Rankings gaining PGA Tour cards for the following season.

The European Tour did not take any disciplinary action until the end of June, when it was announced that LIV Golf participants would be fined and suspended from the European Tour's three PGA Tour co-sanctioned events. Several players, including Ian Poulter, took legal action and the suspensions were put on hold, allowing them to play in the Genesis Scottish Open and subsequent tour events pending a full hearing, which was scheduled by Sport Resolutions UK for February 2023. On 20 June 2022, the tour removed Henrik Stenson as captain of the European Ryder Cup team as a result of his decision to join LIV Golf.

=== Trademark issues ===
In March 2023, David Grutman's Miami nightclub LIV—a nightclub that is among the highest grossing in the United States—filed a Notice of Opposition seeking to block a US trademark registration by LIV Golf, citing that its marks "are visually, phonetically, and aurally similar and the goods/services share similarities", and that it would "dilute the distinctive quality" of its brand. LIV in Miami opened in 2008, with its name referring to the fact that its location—the Fontainebleau Miami Beach hotel—originally opened in 1954.

== Proposed merger of commercial rights of LIV, PGA and European Tours ==
On 6 June 2023, LIV Golf, the PGA Tour, and PGA European Tour announced that the three organizations would pool their commercial rights into a new for-profit venture, which would be funded by the Public Investment Fund. The announcement stated that the merger is intended to "unify the game of golf on a global basis" and "ensure that all stakeholders benefit from a model that delivers maximum excitement and competition among the game's best players." Current PGA Tour commissioner Jay Monahan will serve as CEO of the new entity, with Yasir Al-Rumayyan as chairman, and the PGA Tour appointing the majority of its board. All three tours will maintain administrative oversight and sanctioning of their events. This agreement ends all existing litigation, and there are plans for a "fair and objective process for any players who desire to re-apply for membership". The agreement was controversial among some PGA Tour players.

The deadline for completing the deal was 31 December 2023, although it was reported that the parties were attempting to negotiate an extension. On 31 January 2024, the PGA Tour announced an investment into its for-profit arm—PGA Tour Enterprises—by a Fenway Sports Group-backed consortium of US professional sports owners. Strategic Sports Group would pay $1.5 billion initially, and then a second $1.5 billion following the conclusion of negotiations between the PGA Tour and the Saudi Public Investment Fund. In addition, active players would be given an opportunity to receive grants of equity in PGA Tour Enterprises.

== Public Investment Fund withdrawal and bankruptcy ==
In April 2026, the Saudi Arabia Public Investment Fund announced that it was reevaluating its priorities. This is against mounting pressures and financial commitments to host World Expo 2030 and the 2034 FIFA World Cup. Bloomberg News reported the following May that due to the Public Investment Fund withdrawal, LIV Golf was searching for new investors and considering filing for bankruptcy in the US.

In September 2026, LIV Golf filed for Chapter 11 bankruptcy protection, indicating that it had assets between $100 million and $500 million and liabilities between $500 million and $1 billion, in addition to owing millions in debt to several of its players. The British investment firm BC Partners was slated to provide a $300 million cash injection to keep the league afloat in time for a revamped 2027 season on the condition that most of the top players remained with the tour. After several players, including Jon Rahm and Sergio García, indicated that they would leave, it was reported in November that BC Partners had pulled out, which was confirmed during bankruptcy proceedings and led to the tour winding down operations.

After LIV's disbandment, many of its players wondered how they would get the money the league owed them and qualify to return to the PGA Tour. Rory McIlroy accused LIV Golf of "turning professional golf into an arms race" in a press conference the day before the disbandment announcement. Patrick Reed, Jon Rahm, Tyrrell Hatton, Bryson DeChambeau, and many other players on the tour will face uncertain futures in 2027 and beyond, as under current PGA Tour policy, former LIV golfers must serve a one-year suspension before becoming eligible to return. Some announced their intentions to play in the DP World Tour while waiting to re-qualify for the PGA Tour.

== LIV Golf seasons ==
=== 2022 season ===
On 17 March 2022, the first eight tournament schedule with prize money of $255 million was announced by Greg Norman. The no cut 54-hole tournaments featured 48 players drafted into 12 four-man teams, with shotgun starts. The first seven events would have $20 million purses with an additional $5 million split among the top three teams each week; a team championship concluded the schedule with $30 million on offer to the top three players and an additional $50 million in team prizes.

=== 2023 season ===
The season was renamed as the LIV Golf League for the 2023 season having previously been the LIV Golf Invitational Series. In January 2023, the schedule for the second LIV Golf season was released. The season consisted of 14 no cut 54-hole tournaments. There were several different locations and golf courses in the 2023 season, including new venues in the US, Mexico, Singapore, and Australia. The individual championship was won by Talor Gooch and the team championship was won by Crushers GC.

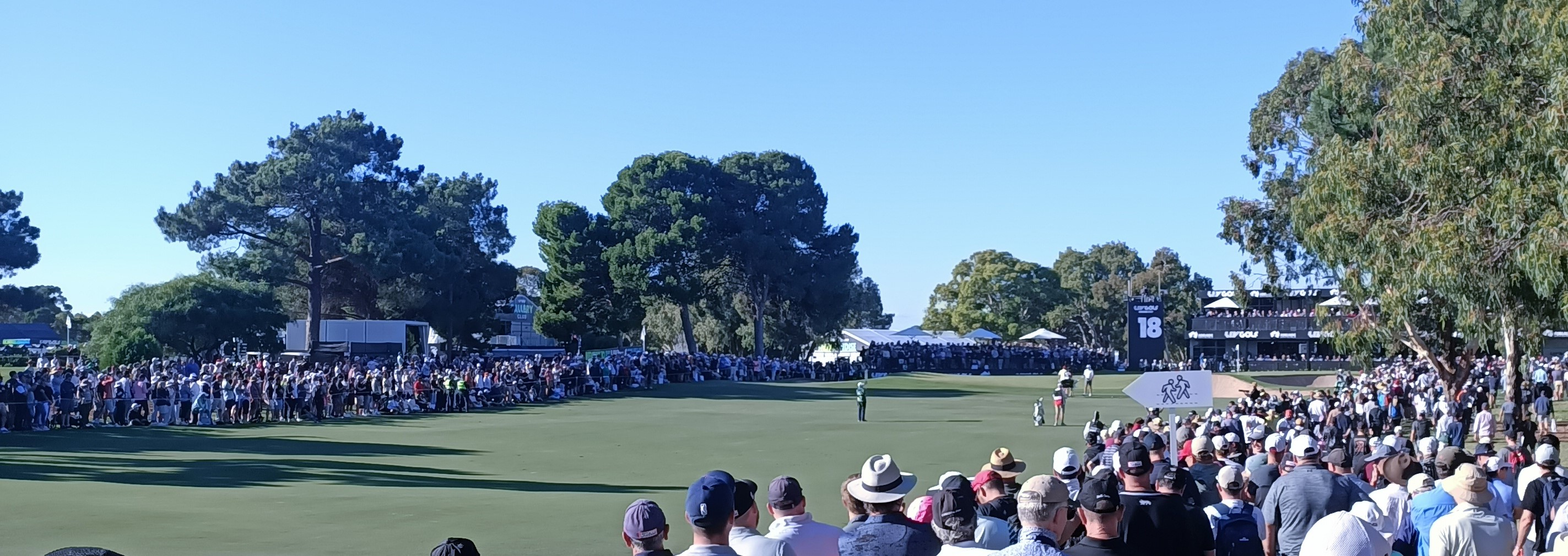
LIVGolf Adelaide 2023

=== 2024 season ===
The 2024 season began in February 2024. The season consisted again of 14 no-cut 54-hole tournaments. New locations on the schedule for the season included West Virginia, Nashville, Las Vegas, Houston, and Hong Kong. At the end of the season, a new individual championship was held, in addition to the team championship that has been held each of the first two seasons. As of 11 December 2023, details about the format of the individual championship have not been released. Newcomers for the 2024 season included PGA Tour winner Tyrell Hatton and two-time major champion Jon Rahm.

=== 2025 season ===
The 2025 LIV Golf schedule featured 14 events across nine countries, with new stops in South Korea, Singapore, Hong Kong, and Spain. The season opened in Riyadh with the tour's first-ever tournament played under lights. The team championship was held in August in Michigan. Six of the 14 events were based in the United States.

=== 2026 season ===
The 2026 LIV Golf schedule was officially confirmed in October 2025, with events slated in South Africa, Mexico City, and New Orleans, among other locations. This marks the league's first event in South Africa.

The 2026 season featured the new 72-hole format the league announced to "align [LIV Golf] with the historic format recognized globally". The format was thought to help the league's inclusion in the Official World Golf Ranking system after the OWGR originally denied its inclusion in October 2023.

LIV Golf filed for Chapter 11 Bankruptcy protection in September 2026, indicating that it had assets between $100 million and $500 million and liabilities between $500 million and $1 billion, in addition to owing millions in debt to several of its players. Plans for a revised 2027 season were announced pending a cash injection from BC Partners, but ultimately didn't come through.

== Points and money list winners ==
Top earners of points and money, by year
Season	Individual points list	Points	Team champions	Points	Money list	Prize money ($)
2026	(Spain) Jon Rahm (3)	1,574	4Aces GC (Note: Thomas Detry, Dustin Johnson (c), Anthony Kim and Thomas Pieters)	150	(Spain) Jon Rahm (3)	25,991,708
2025	(Spain) Jon Rahm (2)	226	Legion XIII (Note: Tyrrell Hatton, Tom McKibbin, Jon Rahm (c) and Caleb Surratt)	−20	(Spain) Jon Rahm (2)	31,608,791
2024	(Spain) Jon Rahm	235	Ripper GC (Note: Lucas Herbert, Matt Jones, Marc Leishman and Cameron Smith (c))	151	(Spain) Jon Rahm	34,737,904
2023	(United States) Talor Gooch	192	Crushers GC (Note: Paul Casey, Bryson DeChambeau (c), Charles Howell III and Anirban Lahiri)	186	(United States) Talor Gooch	35,320,012
2022	(United States) Dustin Johnson	135	4Aces GC (Note: Talor Gooch, Dustin Johnson (c), Pat Perez and Patrick Reed)	152	(United States) Dustin Johnson	35,637,767

== Awards ==
Awards earned by LIV golfers, by year
Season	Most Valuable Player	Breakout Star of the Year
2025	(Chile) Joaquín Niemann	(Spain) David Puig

== Career money leaders ==
The top ten career money leaders on the tour, as of August 2025, are as follows:

Top money earners over LIV career
Position	Player	Prize money ($)
1	(Spain) Jon Rahm	74,976,946
2	(Chile) Joaquin Niemann	68,550,427
3	(United States) Talor Gooch	66,452,780
4	(United States) Dustin Johnson	60,886,255
5	(United States) Bryson DeChambeau	47,607,131
6	(Australia) Cameron Smith	47,251,040
7	(United States) Brooks Koepka	44,710,115
8	(Spain) Sergio García	44,682,241
9	(United States) Patrick Reed	37,489,509
10	(South Africa) Branden Grace	36,016,844

The figures above include all prize money won by the golfers, including individual winnings, team earnings, and bonuses earned based on their finish in the individual and team standings. It does not include other money earned as part of their contracts with their teams and LIV Golf.

== Broadcasting ==
LIV Golf's telecasts employed a number of technological features leveraging in-house shot tracking, including mics on caddies, the "LIV Line" (which was used to visualize how a putt will break), and camera drones. In 2024, as part of a partnership with Google Cloud, LIV introduced a feature on its streaming platform known as "Any Shot, Any Time", in which all groups receive broadcast coverage, and viewers can customize the live stream and on-demand highlights to focus on specific players.

=== Broadcasting rights ===
LIV reached non-exclusive agreements with multiple broadcasters ahead of the first league event, including DAZN (Canada, Germany, Italy, Spain, Japan, and the United States), DirecTV (Latin America), Eleven Sports (Belgium, Portugal, Southeast Asia), L'Équipe (France), Mola (Indonesia, Malaysia, Singapore), Sina Sports (China), Sky Deutschland (Germany), SPOTV, Coupang Play (South Korea), SuperSport (South Africa), and Viaplay (Nordic Europe). These agreements would come alongside streams on Facebook and YouTube.

In March 2025, LIV Golf announced a global broadcasting agreement with DAZN, which would see it stream its events via the FAST channel LIV Golf+ on the DAZN app, and develop a paid, subscription service. The deal covered around 200 countries on a non-exclusive basis, and included exclusive rights in Austria, Belgium, Canada, France, Germany, Italy, Japan, Portugal and Switzerland. DAZN had recently received an investment by the PIF. As of the 2025 season, LIV estimated that it had coverage in 120 countries, with each event seen by an average global audience of 2.5 to 3.5 million.

==== United States ====
In January 2023, LIV signed their first national broadcasting deal in the United States with The CW, a broadcast network controlled by Nexstar Media Group. While the network secured full national distribution for these telecasts, CW affiliates in some markets declined to carry LIV Golf due to existing programming commitments or other reasons (The CW's affiliation contracts only obligated stations to carry its prime time programming), including groups such as CBS News and Stations (CBS Sports is a rightsholder of the PGA Tour), and Weigel Broadcasting. The network had to find alternate affiliates to carry the telecasts, including several other Nexstar-owned stations.

On 16 January 2025, it was announced that Fox Sports had signed a multi-year deal with LIV Golf to broadcast the tour, with coverage to be divided between Fox Sports 1 and the Fox broadcast network (with Fox Sports 2 and Fox Business as overflow). The deal came as LIV Golf struggled to gain viewership in its first two seasons on The CW, resulting in the organization leaving the network.

==== United Kingdom ====
In February 2025, it was announced that ITV had signed a deal to broadcast the 2025 season in the United Kingdom via their ITVX streaming platform, with selected events on ITV1 and ITV4. In January 2026, it was announced that TNT Sports had signed a multi-year deal with LIV Golf to broadcast the tour for UK and Ireland viewers, also replacing previous FTA broadcaster ITV.
