= 2021 U.S. Open (golf) =

121st U.S. Open

Tournament information
- Dates: June 17–20, 2021
- Location: San Diego, California; 32°54′14″N 117°14′46″W
- Courses: Torrey Pines Golf Course; South Course
- Organized by: USGA
- Tours: PGA Tour; European Tour; Japan Golf Tour

Statistics
- Par: 71
- Length: 7,685 yards (7,027 m)
- Field: 156 players, 71 after cut
- Cut: 146 (+4)
- Prize fund: $12,500,000
- Winner's share: $2,250,000

Champion
- (Spain) Jon Rahm
- 278 (−6)

Location map
- Location in the United States Location in California

The 2021 United States Open Championship was the 121st U.S. Open, the national open golf championship of the United States. It was a 72-hole stroke play tournament that was played June 17–20 on the South Course at Torrey Pines Golf Course in La Jolla, a community of San Diego, California. The South Course previously hosted in 2008, which was won by Tiger Woods in a playoff.

The field consisted of 156 players, with 88 gaining their place through automatic exemption criteria and the remaining 68 making it through qualifying, including two alternates. The defending champion was Bryson DeChambeau, who won the 120th U.S. Open, which had been postponed due to the COVID-19 pandemic, at Winged Foot in September 2020.

Jon Rahm made a birdie on each of the final two holes to become the first U.S. Open champion from Spain and win his first major championship. Rahm finished one shot ahead of South African Louis Oosthuizen, who had held a share of the lead going into the final round. Two strokes further back in third place was American Harris English. DeChambeau had moved into the lead midway through the final round, but fell away with two bogeys, a double-bogey and a quadruple-bogey on the back-nine to finish outside the top twenty. During the tournament, Englishman Richard Bland became the oldest player to hold a share of the 36-hole lead in a U.S. Open; he finished tied for 50th place.

== Course ==
Torrey Pines Golf Course is situated in the La Jolla community of San Diego and has two 18-hole golf courses, the North Course and the South Course. The U.S. Open was held on the South Course, which previously hosted the championship in 2008, when Tiger Woods defeated Rocco Mediate on the first sudden-death extra hole after they remained tied following an 18-hole playoff. The Farmers Insurance Open, a PGA Tour event formerly known as the San Diego Open, is held annually over both courses.

Torrey Pines Golf Course – South
Tee	Rating/Slope	1	2	3	4	5	6	7	8	9	Out	10	11	12	13	14	15	16	17	18	In	Total
Par		4	4	3	4	4	4	4	3	5	35	4	3	4	5	4	4	3	4	5	36	71
Yardage		446	387	195	486	452	515	460	173	609	3,723	449	222	501	612	434	513	223	440	568	3,929	7,685
Round 1		440	396	192	493	452	519	453	158	623	3,726	438	222	508	613	438	489	192	435	574	3,909	7,635
Round 2		450	393	168	478	441	507	464	177	609	3,687	457	228	491	621	440	504	223	442	571	3,977	7,664
Round 3		457	399	134	497	464	534	470	171	598	3,724	456	218	513	589	427	521	199	436	533	3,892	7,616
Round 4		450	384	200	481	453	521	458	175	607	3,729	450	213	505	616	443	508	233	434	545	3,947	7,676

Length of the course for previous major:

- 7,643 yards (6,989 m), par 71 – 2008 U.S. Open

== Field ==
The field for the U.S. Open is made up of players who gain entry through qualifying events and those who are exempt from qualifying. The exemption criteria include provision for recent major champions, winners of major amateur events, and leading players in the world rankings. Qualifying is in two stages, local and final, with some players being exempted though to final qualifying.

=== Exemptions ===
This list details the exemption criteria for the 2021 U.S. Open and the players who qualified under them; any additional criteria under which players were exempt is indicated in parentheses. (Note: (a) – denotes amateur.)

1. Recent winners of the U.S. Open (2011–2020)

- Bryson DeChambeau (2,10,11,15)
- Dustin Johnson (2,5,10,11,15)
- Martin Kaymer
- Brooks Koepka (6,15)
- Rory McIlroy (2,8,10,15)
- Justin Rose (15)
- Webb Simpson (2,10,15)
- Jordan Spieth (7,15)
- Gary Woodland (15)

2. The leading ten players, and those tying for tenth place, in the 2020 U.S. Open

- Harris English (10,15)
- Tony Finau (10,15)
- Zach Johnson
- Louis Oosthuizen (15)
- Xander Schauffele (10,15)
- Justin Thomas (6,8,10,11,15)
- Matthew Wolff (15)
- Will Zalatoris (15)

3. The winner of the 2020 U.S. Amateur

- Tyler Strafaci

4. The runner-up in the 2020 U.S. Amateur (Note: Normally, this category includes winners of the U.S. Junior Amateur and U.S. Mid-Amateur championships, but neither was held in 2020.) (Note: Players qualifying in these categories must remain an amateur through the conclusion of the U.S. Open.)

- Ollie Osborne (a)

5. Recent winners of the Masters Tournament (2017–2021)

- Sergio García (15)
- Hideki Matsuyama (10,15)
- Patrick Reed (10,15)
- Tiger Woods did not play.

6. Recent winners of the PGA Championship (2016–2021)

- Phil Mickelson (15,18)
- Collin Morikawa (10,11,15)
- Jimmy Walker

7. Recent winners of The Open Championship (2016–2019)

- Shane Lowry (15)
- Francesco Molinari
- Henrik Stenson

8. Recent winners of The Players Championship (2019–2021)

9. The winner of the 2020 BMW PGA Championship

- Tyrrell Hatton (10,15)

10. All players who qualified for the 2020 Tour Championship

- Abraham Ancer (15)
- Daniel Berger (15)
- Cameron Champ
- Lanto Griffin
- Billy Horschel (15)
- Viktor Hovland (15)
- Mackenzie Hughes
- Im Sung-jae (15)
- Kevin Kisner (15)
- Marc Leishman (15)
- Sebastián Muñoz
- Kevin Na (15)
- Joaquín Niemann (15)
- Ryan Palmer (15)
- Jon Rahm (11,15)
- Scottie Scheffler (15)
- Cameron Smith (15)
- Brendon Todd

11. Winners of multiple PGA Tour events (Note: Events must carry full-point allocation towards the FedEx Cup.) from the originally scheduled date of the 2020 U.S. Open (June 21, 2020) to the start of the 2021 tournament

- Patrick Cantlay (15)
- Stewart Cink (15)
- Jason Kokrak (15)

12. The leading 10 points winners from the "European Qualifying Series" (Note: The European Qualifying Series consisted of three tournaments: Betfred British Masters, Made in HimmerLand and Porsche European Open.) who are not otherwise exempt

- Marcus Armitage
- Richard Bland
- Dave Coupland
- Thomas Detry
- Adrian Meronk
- Guido Migliozzi
- Edoardo Molinari
- Jordan Smith
- Matthew Southgate
- Mikko Korhonen did not play.

13. The winner of the 2020 Amateur Championship

- Joe Long (a)

14. The winner of the Mark H. McCormack Medal in 2020

- ~~Takumi Kanaya~~ (Note: Kanaya turned professional in October 2020, forfeiting his exemption.)

15. The leading 60 players on the Official World Golf Ranking as of May 24, 2021

- Christiaan Bezuidenhout
- Sam Burns
- Paul Casey
- Corey Conners
- Matt Fitzpatrick
- Tommy Fleetwood
- Brian Harman
- Russell Henley
- Garrick Higgo
- Max Homa
- Matt Jones
- Kim Si-woo
- Matt Kuchar
- Lee Kyoung-hoon
- Robert MacIntyre
- Carlos Ortiz
- Victor Perez
- Adam Scott
- Kevin Streelman
- Matt Wallace
- Bubba Watson
- Lee Westwood

16. The leading 60 players on the Official World Golf Ranking if not otherwise exempt as of June 7, 2021

- Charley Hoffman
- Ian Poulter
- Bernd Wiesberger

17. The leading player from each of the 2020–21 Asian Tour, 2020–21 PGA Tour of Australasia and 2021–22 Sunshine Tour Orders of Merit

- Brad Kennedy
- Wilco Nienaber
- Wade Ormsby

18. Special exemptions (Note: Phil Mickelson was granted exemption prior to his 2021 PGA Championship win, after which he automatically qualified and no longer needed the exemption.)

=== Qualifiers ===
Initially, eleven final qualifying events were scheduled, nine of which are in the United States: In April, a further venue was added in South Carolina. A final qualifier scheduled for June 7 at RattleSnake Point Golf Club in Milton, Ontario, was canceled due to COVID-19 restrictions in Canada.

Date	Location	Venue	Field	Spots	Qualifiers (Note: (L) – denotes a player who progressed through local qualifying.)
May 24	Hokota, Ibaraki, Japan	The Royal Golf Club	14	2	Yosuke Asaji, Ryo Ishikawa
May 24	Dallas, Texas	Dallas Athletic Club	115	10	Luis Fernando Barco (L), Paul Barjon, Mario Carmona (L), Eric Cole (L), Álvaro Ortiz, Matti Schmid (a), Matthew Sharpstene (a), Hayden Springer (L), Johannes Veerman, Kyle Westmoreland (L)
Jun 7	Milton, Ontario, Canada	RattleSnake Point Golf Club	–	–	Event cancelled due to the COVID-19 pandemic
Jun 7	Rolling Hills, California	Rolling Hills Country Club	90	5	Roy Cootes (L), Rikuya Hoshino, Chan Kim, Taylor Montgomery, Justin Suh
Jun 7	Jupiter, Florida	The Bear's Club	78	6	Thomas Aiken, Luis Gagne (L), Fabián Gómez, Branden Grace, Andrew Kozan (a,L), Patrick Rodgers
Jun 7	Atlanta, Georgia	Piedmont Driving Club	72	5	Hayden Buckley, Rick Lamb, Spencer Ralston (a), Davis Shore (L), Greyson Sigg
Jun 7	Rockville, Maryland	Woodmont Country Club	71	4	Chris Baker, Chris Crawford (L), Taylor Pendrith, Dylan Wu
Jun 7	Purchase, New York	Century Country Club and Old Oaks Country Club	79	4	Jimmy Hervol (L), Andy Pope, Cameron Young, Zach Zaback (L)
Jun 7	Columbus, Ohio	Brookside Golf & Country Club and The Lakes Golf & Country Club	120	16	Rafa Cabrera-Bello, Wyndham Clark, Pierceson Coody (a), Dylan Frittelli, Adam Hadwin, Tom Hoge, Michael Johnson (L), Kang Sung-hoon, Martin Laird, Peter Malnati, J. T. Poston, Chez Reavie, Charl Schwartzel, Brendan Steele, Erik van Rooyen, Jhonattan Vegas
Jun 7	Springfield, Ohio	Springfield Country Club	77	7	Bo Hoag, Troy Merritt, Dylan Meyer (L), Carson Schaake (L), Robby Shelton, Brian Stuard, Sahith Theegala (L)
Jun 7	Hilton Head Island, South Carolina	Long Cove Club	53	5	Akshay Bhatia, Wilson Furr (L), John Huh, Sam Ryder, J. J. Spaun
Jun 7	Richland, Washington	Meadow Springs Country Club	45	2	Stephen Allan (L), Joe Highsmith (a,L)

==== Alternates who gained entry ====
The following players gained a place in the field having finished as the leading alternates in the specified final qualifying events:

- Cole Hammer (a, Columbus) – replaced Korhonen
- Zack Sucher (Hilton Head) – took the final spot that was held open until the conclusion of the Palmetto Championship

== Round summaries ==
=== First round ===
Thursday, June 17, 2021
Friday, June 18, 2021

Fog delayed the start by 90 minutes and, as a result, 36 players did not complete their opening round before play was suspended due to darkness. Russell Henley led with a 4-under-par round of 67, with Louis Oosthuizen also on 4-under-par with two holes to play. Rafa Cabrera-Bello and Francesco Molinari were a stroke behind after rounds of 68. Defending champion, Bryson DeChambeau, had a round of 73 while PGA champion Phil Mickelson scored 75. Play resumed early on Friday, with Oosthuizen finishing with two pars to join Henley at 4-under-par.

Place	Player	Score	To par
T1	(United States) Russell Henley	67	−4
T1	(South Africa) Louis Oosthuizen	67	−4
T3	(Spain) Rafa Cabrera-Bello	68	−3
T3	(Italy) Francesco Molinari	68	−3
T5	(United States) Hayden Buckley	69	−2
T5	(Japan) Rikuya Hoshino	69	−2
T5	(United States) Brooks Koepka	69	−2
T5	(Japan) Hideki Matsuyama	69	−2
T5	(Spain) Jon Rahm	69	−2
T5	(United States) Xander Schauffele	69	−2

=== Second round ===
Friday, June 18, 2021

First-round co-leader Russell Henley took the outright lead at six-under after hitting his approach shot to the par-3 8th hole (his 17th) to seven feet and making the putt for birdie. On the par-5 9th, his last of the round, he missed a four-foot putt for par to suffer his first bogey of the round and fall back to five-under following a one-under 70. Richard Bland, making his first U.S. Open appearance in 12 years, made three birdies in a five-hole stretch on his closing nine to also get to six-under before a bogey at the 8th. At the age of 48, Bland became the oldest player to hold a share of the 36-hole lead in U.S. Open history.

Matthew Wolff, runner-up in 2020, did not make a bogey over his last 16 holes and two-putted for birdie on the par-5 18th after reaching the green in two shots; he shot 68 (−3) and finished the round at four-under for the tournament, tied for third with Louis Oosthuizen and a shot off the lead. Oosthuizen was two-over on his round through 13 holes before birdies on the 14th and 18th to shoot even-par 71.

Bubba Watson did not record a par over his last seven holes, making five birdies and two bogeys for a round of 67 (−4), tied for lowest of the day with Bland, Collin Morikawa, and Mackenzie Hughes. Jon Rahm, less than two weeks after being forced to withdraw from the Memorial Tournament after testing positive for COVID-19, birdied the 18th to complete a one-under round and tie Watson at three-under for the tournament, in a tie for fifth place. Two-time champion Brooks Koepka got to within one shot of the lead after two birdies in his first four holes but made five bogeys the rest of the round to fall back to even-par.

The 36-hole cut came at 146 (+4). Notables to miss the cut included past champions Justin Rose and Webb Simpson. Hayden Buckley, who began the round tied for fifth place, shot 11-over 82 to miss the cut by five. None of the nine amateurs made the cut.

Place	Player	Score	To par
T1	(England) Richard Bland	70-67=137	−5
T1	(United States) Russell Henley	67-70=137	−5
T3	(South Africa) Louis Oosthuizen	67-71=138	−4
T3	(United States) Matthew Wolff	70-68=138	−4
T5	(Spain) Jon Rahm	69-70=139	−3
T5	(United States) Bubba Watson	72-67=139	−3
T7	(Canada) Mackenzie Hughes	73-67=140	−2
T7	(United States) Xander Schauffele	69-71=140	−2
T7	(United States) Kevin Streelman	71-69=140	−2
T10	(Italy) Guido Migliozzi	71-70=141	−1
T10	(United States) Patrick Rodgers	70-71=141	−1
T10	(United States) Scottie Scheffler	72-69=141	−1

=== Third round ===
Saturday, June 19, 2021

Louis Oosthuizen made a 51-foot eagle putt on the 18th hole to tie Russell Henley and Mackenzie Hughes for the 54-hole lead at five-under. Hughes made his own 63-foot putt for eagle on the 13th, then holed out from five feet for birdie on 18 to shoot 68 (−3). Hughes became the first Canadian to hold the lead after the third round at the U.S. Open. Henley, co-leader after the first two rounds, holed out from a greenside bunker for birdie on the par-3 11th and saved par from a bunker on the last hole to shoot even-par.

Rory McIlroy made four birdies on the back-nine, including a chip-in from the rough to the right of the green on the 12th, and tied for the lowest round of the day at 67 (−4). He finished at three-under, two shots off the lead. Defending champion Bryson DeChambeau did not make a bogey in a three-under round of 68 to tie McIlroy for fourth place.

Richard Bland, co-leader with Henley coming into the round, did not make a birdie and shot six-over 77, falling to a tie for 21st place.

Place	Player	Score	To par
T1	(United States) Russell Henley	67-70-71=208	−5
T1	(Canada) Mackenzie Hughes	73-67-68=208	−5
T1	(South Africa) Louis Oosthuizen	67-71-70=208	−5
T4	(United States) Bryson DeChambeau	73-69-68=210	−3
T4	(Northern Ireland) Rory McIlroy	70-73-67=210	−3
T6	(Spain) Jon Rahm	69-70-72=211	−2
T6	(United States) Scottie Scheffler	72-69-70=211	−2
T6	(United States) Matthew Wolff	70-68-73=211	−2
T9	(South Africa) Christiaan Bezuidenhout	72-70-70=212	−1
T9	(United States) Dustin Johnson	71-73-68=212	−1
T9	(United States) Collin Morikawa	75-67-70=212	−1
T9	(United States) Xander Schauffele	69-71-72=212	−1
T9	(United States) Kevin Streelman	71-69-72=212	−1

=== Final round ===
Sunday, June 20, 2021

==== Summary ====
Jon Rahm birdied both the 17th and 18th holes to win his first U.S. Open title and first career major championship. A shot behind leader Louis Oosthuizen playing the par-4 17th, Rahm hit his approach to 25 feet and made the putt to tie for the lead at five-under. On the par-5 18th, he found a greenside bunker with his second shot, chipped out to 18 feet, and holed the putt to finish at six-under for the tournament. Rahm became the first player since Tom Watson in 1982 to win the U.S. Open with birdies on the final two holes.

A crowded leaderboard had 10 players within a shot of the lead at one point. Oosthuizen, a co-leader coming in the round, was one-over on his round before making consecutive birdies on holes 9 and 10 to get to six-under and lead by two. He bogeyed the par-3 11th after hitting his approach into the rough to the right of the green, then, on the 17th, drove into a penalty area off the tee and made another bogey. Needing an eagle on the 18th, his third shot from short of the green flew 10 feet past the hole. Oosthuizen settled for his sixth career runner-up finish in a major and second at the U.S. Open.

Defending champion Bryson DeChambeau took sole possession of the lead after nearly making a hole-in-one on the par-3 eighth. But he then bogeyed both the 11th and 12th before making double-bogey on the par-5 13th and quadruple-bogey eight on the 17th. He played his final nine holes in eight-over to fall to a tie for 26th place. Rory McIlroy, 2011 champion, got into a share of the lead on the front-nine but fell from contention with a double bogey on the 12th after his second shot plugged in the greenside bunker; he finished at one-under, five shots back and in a tie for seventh.

Two-time champion Brooks Koepka was four-under on his round and just a shot off the lead after making a 16-foot birdie putt on the 15th but bogeyed two of his final three holes to finish at two-under.

Russell Henley and Mackenzie Hughes, part of a three-way tie for the lead at the start of the round, both fell outside the top-10. Henley went three-over on the front-nine and made only one birdie in a five-over round of 76 to finish in 13th. Hughes double-bogeyed the 11th after his tee shot got stuck in a tree; he shot 77 (+6) and finished tied for 15th.

==== Final leaderboard ====
Champion
(a) = amateur
(c) = past champion

Top 10
Place	Player	Score	To par	Money (US$)
1	(Spain) Jon Rahm	69-70-72-67=278	−6	2,250,000
2	(South Africa) Louis Oosthuizen	67-71-70-71=279	−5	1,350,000
3	(United States) Harris English	72-70-71-68=281	−3	829,084
T4	(United States) Brooks Koepka (c)	69-73-71-69=282	−2	498,176
T4	(Italy) Guido Migliozzi	71-70-73-68=282	−2	498,176
T4	(United States) Collin Morikawa	75-67-70-70=282	−2	498,176
T7	(United States) Daniel Berger	71-72-72-68=283	−1	306,893
T7	(England) Paul Casey	71-75-67-70=283	−1	306,893
T7	(South Africa) Branden Grace	72-70-74-67=283	−1	306,893
T7	(Northern Ireland) Rory McIlroy (c)	70-73-67-73=283	−1	306,893
T7	(United States) Xander Schauffele	69-71-72-71=283	−1	306,893
T7	(United States) Scottie Scheffler	72-69-70-72=283	−1	306,893

Leaderboard below the top 10
Place	Player	Score	To par	Money ($)
T13	(United States) Russell Henley	67-70-71-76=284	E	217,796
T13	(Italy) Francesco Molinari	68-76-69-71=284	E	217,796
T15	(United States) Patrick Cantlay	70-75-71-69=285	+1	177,279
T15	(Canada) Mackenzie Hughes	73-67-68-77=285	+1	177,279
T15	(United States) Kevin Streelman	71-69-72-73=285	+1	177,279
T15	(United States) Matthew Wolff	70-68-73-74=285	+1	177,279
T19	(Spain) Sergio García	71-74-73-68=286	+2	125,363
T19	(United States) Brian Harman	72-71-71-72=286	+2	125,363
T19	(United States) Dustin Johnson (c)	71-73-68-74=286	+2	125,363
T19	(United States) Patrick Reed	72-73-74-67=286	+2	125,363
T19	(South Africa) Charl Schwartzel	71-74-71-70=286	+2	125,363
T19	(United States) Jordan Spieth (c)	77-69-68-72=286	+2	125,363
T19	(United States) Justin Thomas	73-69-71-73=286	+2	125,363
T26	(United States) Chris Baker	74-71-69-73=287	+3	87,941
T26	(United States) Bryson DeChambeau (c)	73-69-68-77=287	+3	87,941
T26	(Japan) Rikuya Hoshino	69-74-73-71=287	+3	87,941
T26	(Germany) Martin Kaymer (c)	77-68-69-73=287	+3	87,941
T26	(Japan) Hideki Matsuyama	69-76-74-68=287	+3	87,941
T31	(South Africa) Christiaan Bezuidenhout	72-70-70-76=288	+4	71,030
T31	(Chile) Joaquín Niemann	75-69-71-73=288	+4	71,030
T31	(United States) Patrick Rodgers	70-71-77-70=288	+4	71,030
T31	(United States) Dylan Wu	70-73-74-71=288	+4	71,030
T35	(United States) Lanto Griffin	76-69-69-75=289	+5	57,696
T35	(South Korea) Im Sung-jae	72-72-69-76=289	+5	57,696
T35	(Scotland) Robert MacIntyre	71-73-72-73=289	+5	57,696
T35	(Italy) Edoardo Molinari	70-76-72-71=289	+5	57,696
T35	(Australia) Adam Scott	70-75-71-73=289	+5	57,696
T40	(Canada) Adam Hadwin	70-72-75-73=290	+6	43,883
T40	(South Korea) Kim Si-woo	71-75-70-74=290	+6	43,883
T40	(Australia) Wade Ormsby	72-74-73-71=290	+6	43,883
T40	(United States) J. T. Poston	72-73-71-74=290	+6	43,883
T40	(England) Ian Poulter	74-71-68-77=290	+6	43,883
T40	(United States) Chez Reavie	76-68-72-74=290	+6	43,883
T46	(South Africa) Dylan Frittelli	73-72-72-74=291	+7	32,351
T46	(United States) Tom Hoge	72-71-76-72=291	+7	32,351
T46	(United States) Rick Lamb	71-75-74-71=291	+7	32,351
T46	(England) Lee Westwood	71-72-71-77=291	+7	32,351
T50	(England) Richard Bland	70-67-77-78=292	+8	27,327
T50	(Spain) Rafa Cabrera-Bello	68-76-74-74=292	+8	27,327
T50	(England) Tommy Fleetwood	72-73-74-73=292	+8	27,327
T50	(United States) Bubba Watson	72-67-77-76=292	+8	27,327
T50	(United States) Gary Woodland (c)	74-71-73-74=292	+8	27,327
T55	(England) Matt Fitzpatrick	70-75-72-76=293	+9	26,056
T55	(United States) Kevin Kisner	73-73-72-75=293	+9	26,056
T57	(United States) Akshay Bhatia	73-73-73-75=294	+10	25,183
T57	(United States) Stewart Cink	73-72-74-75=294	+10	25,183
T57	(United States) Charley Hoffman	72-71-75-76=294	+10	25,183
T57	(United States) Taylor Montgomery	70-76-74-74=294	+10	25,183
T57	(Venezuela) Jhonattan Vegas	75-69-74-76=294	+10	25,183
T62	(United States) Phil Mickelson	75-69-76-75=295	+11	24,310
T62	(United States) Greyson Sigg	71-74-75-75=295	+11	24,310
64	(Australia) Marc Leishman	74-70-75-77=296	+12	23,936
T65	(Australia) Matt Jones	72-71-79-75=297	+13	23,437
T65	(Republic of Ireland) Shane Lowry	72-74-72-79=297	+13	23,437
T65	(United States) Troy Merritt	75-71-73-78=297	+13	23,437
T68	(South Africa) Wilco Nienaber	72-74-80-72=298	+14	22,814
T68	(United States) Kyle Westmoreland	71-73-78-76=298	+14	22,814
T70	(Argentina) Fabián Gómez	70-76-78-79=303	+19	22,309
T70	(United States) Jimmy Walker	74-72-77-80=303	+19	22,309
CUT	(England) Marcus Armitage	71-76=147	+5	
CUT	(United States) Sam Burns	73-74=147	+5	
CUT	(United States) Wyndham Clark	75-72=147	+5	
CUT	(Belgium) Thomas Detry	71-76=147	+5	
CUT	(United States) Andrew Kozan (a)	71-76=147	+5	
CUT	(Canada) Taylor Pendrith	75-72=147	+5	
CUT	(United States) Sam Ryder	77-70=147	+5	
CUT	(Australia) Cameron Smith	72-75=147	+5	
CUT	(United States) Brendan Steele	73-74=147	+5	
CUT	(South Africa) Erik van Rooyen	74-73=147	+5	
CUT	(Austria) Bernd Wiesberger	75-72=147	+5	
CUT	(United States) Zach Zaback	75-72=147	+5	
CUT	(Canada) Corey Conners	75-73=148	+6	
CUT	(England) Tyrrell Hatton	70-78=148	+6	
CUT	(South Africa) Garrick Higgo	76-72=148	+6	
CUT	(United States) Zach Johnson	75-73=148	+6	
CUT	(United States) Matt Kuchar	73-75=148	+6	
CUT	(Colombia) Sebastián Muñoz	71-77=148	+6	
CUT	(Mexico) Carlos Ortiz	75-73=148	+6	
CUT	(United States) Ollie Osborne (a)	76-72=148	+6	
CUT	(United States) Spencer Ralston (a)	75-73=148	+6	
CUT	(United States) Johannes Veerman	73-75=148	+6	
CUT	(England) Matt Wallace	74-74=148	+6	
CUT	(United States) Joe Highsmith (a)	76-73=149	+7	
CUT	(United States) Max Homa	76-73=149	+7	
CUT	(United States) Billy Horschel	74-75=149	+7	
CUT	(United States) Michael Johnson	74-75=149	+7	
CUT	(United States) Robby Shelton	78-71=149	+7	
CUT	(England) Jordan Smith	77-72=149	+7	
CUT	(United States) Zack Sucher	75-74=149	+7	
CUT	(United States) Sahith Theegala	76-73=149	+7	
CUT	(United States) Brendon Todd	78-71=149	+7	
CUT	(United States) Will Zalatoris	75-74=149	+7	
CUT	(Mexico) Abraham Ancer	73-77=150	+8	
CUT	(United States) Eric Cole	77-73=150	+8	
CUT	(United States) Tony Finau	74-76=150	+8	
CUT	(Costa Rica) Luis Gagne	75-75=150	+8	
CUT	(United States) Cole Hammer (a)	77-73=150	+8	
CUT	(Scotland) Martin Laird	74-76=150	+8	
CUT	(United States) Ryan Palmer	76-74=150	+8	
CUT	(France) Victor Perez	75-75=150	+8	
CUT	(United States) Hayden Springer	77-73=150	+8	
CUT	(United States) Cameron Young	72-78=150	+8	
CUT	(Japan) Yosuke Asaji	76-75=151	+9	
CUT	(France) Paul Barjon	73-78=151	+9	
CUT	(United States) Hayden Buckley	69-82=151	+9	
CUT	(United States) Cameron Champ	76-75=151	+9	
CUT	(United States) Pierceson Coody (a)	73-78=151	+9	
CUT	(United States) Jason Kokrak	73-78=151	+9	
CUT	(United States) Peter Malnati	75-76=151	+9	
CUT	(Poland) Adrian Meronk	72-79=151	+9	
CUT	(United States) Kevin Na	77-74=151	+9	
CUT	(United States) Matthew Sharpstene (a)	74-77=151	+9	
CUT	(England) Matthew Southgate	75-76=151	+9	
CUT	(United States) Brian Stuard	78-73=151	+9	
CUT	(Australia) Brad Kennedy	74-78=152	+10	
CUT	(Germany) Matti Schmid (a)	76-76=152	+10	
CUT	(United States) Davis Shore	76-76=152	+10	
CUT	(United States) Webb Simpson (c)	79-73=152	+10	
CUT	(United States) J. J. Spaun	77-75=152	+10	
CUT	(Sweden) Henrik Stenson	76-76=152	+10	
CUT	(United States) Justin Suh	78-74=152	+10	
CUT	(South Africa) Thomas Aiken	80-73=153	+11	
CUT	(United States) Roy Cootes	76-77=153	+11	
CUT	(Japan) Ryo Ishikawa	77-76=153	+11	
CUT	(South Korea) Kang Sung-hoon	75-78=153	+11	
CUT	(United States) Chan Kim	76-77=153	+11	
CUT	(England) Joe Long (a)	77-76=153	+11	
CUT	(United States) Andy Pope	76-77=153	+11	
CUT	(England) Dave Coupland	74-80=154	+12	
CUT	(United States) Chris Crawford	76-79=155	+13	
CUT	(South Korea) Lee Kyoung-hoon	76-79=155	+13	
CUT	(England) Justin Rose (c)	78-77=155	+13	
CUT	(United States) Carson Schaake	76-79=155	+13	
CUT	(Peru) Luis Fernando Barco	77-79=156	+14	
CUT	(United States) Bo Hoag	78-78=156	+14	
CUT	(United States) Dylan Meyer	78-78=156	+14	
CUT	(United States) Tyler Strafaci	78-78=156	+14	
CUT	(Mexico) Mario Carmona	77-80=157	+15	
CUT	(United States) John Huh	80-77=157	+15	
CUT	(Mexico) Álvaro Ortiz	82-75=157	+15	
CUT	(Australia) Stephen Allan	80-79=159	+16	
CUT	(United States) Wilson Furr	77-82=159	+16	
CUT	(United States) Jimmy Hervol	79-81=160	+18	
WD	(Norway) Viktor Hovland	74	+2	

==== Scorecard ====
Hole	1	2	3	4	5	6	7	8	9	10	11	12	13	14	15	16	17	18
Par	4	4	3	4	4	4	4	3	5	4	3	4	5	4	4	3	4	5
(Spain) Rahm	−3	−4	−4	−3	−3	−3	−3	−3	−4	−4	−4	−4	−4	−4	−4	−4	−5	−6
(South Africa) Oosthuizen	−5	−5	−5	−4	−4	−4	−4	−4	−5	−6	−5	−5	−5	−5	−5	−5	−4	−5
(United States) English	+1	E	+1	+2	+1	+1	+1	E	−1	E	E	E	E	−1	−1	−1	−2	−3
(United States) Koepka	E	−1	−1	−1	−1	−1	−1	−2	−3	−3	−3	−2	−3	−3	−4	−3	−3	−2
(United States) Morikawa	−1	−2	−2	−3	−3	−3	−3	−3	−4	−4	−4	−4	−2	−2	−1	−1	−1	−2
(Northern Ireland) McIlroy	−3	−3	−3	−4	−4	−4	−4	−4	−4	−4	−3	−1	−2	−2	−2	−1	−1	−1
(United States) Henley	−4	−4	−5	−5	−5	−4	−3	−2	−2	−2	−2	−2	−1	−1	−1	−1	−1	E
(Canada) Hughes	−4	−4	−4	−4	−3	−2	−3	−3	−4	−4	−2	−1	−1	E	+1	+1	+1	+1
(United States) DeChambeau	−3	−3	−3	−3	−4	−4	−4	−5	−5	−5	−4	−3	−1	−1	−1	−1	+3	+3

Birdie	Bogey	Double bogey	Triple bogey+

== Media ==
This was the second consecutive U.S. Open televised by Golf Channel and NBC. In the UK and Ireland, Sky Sports broadcast the event.
