= Luis Gagne =

Costa Rican professional golfer (born 1997)

Personal information
- Full name: Luis Gerardo Gagne
- Nationality: Costa Rica
- Born: 27 August 1997 (age 29) San José, Costa Rica
- Height: 5 ft 9 in (1.75 m)
- Weight: 165 lb (75 kg; 11.8 st)

Career
- Sport: Golf
- College: Louisiana State University
- Turned professional: 2019
- Current tour: Korn Ferry Tour
- Former tours: PGA Tour Canada; PGA Tour Latinoamérica

Best results in major championships
- Masters Tournament: DNP
- PGA Championship: DNP
- U.S. Open: T48: 2018
- The Open Championship: DNP

Luis Gerardo Gagne (born 27 August 1997) is a Costa Rican professional golfer who is best known for finishing low amateur at the 2018 U.S. Open at Shinnecock Hills.

== Early life and amateur career ==
Gagne was born in Costa Rica, but his family moved to Orlando, Florida, when he was three years old and began playing golf soon after. His first language was Spanish and he learned English at five. One of Gagne's earliest golf memories was, at five years of age, watching Tiger Woods play in the Arnold Palmer Invitational at Bay Hill Club, Florida.

He played collegiate golf for four seasons at Louisiana State University 2015–2019. He ended his sophomore season 2016–2017 ranked 25th in the U.S. in the final Golfweek player rankings . He was also ranked 52nd nationally among college players in the final Golfstat player rankings. He was an All-America Honorable Mention in 2016 and 2017 He earned an All-Southeastern Conference First Team laurel in 2018 and All-SEC Second Team honors in 2017 and 2019. He also earned an All-America Third Team selection in 2018. He holds the second lowest career scoring average in LSU history at 71.54.

Gagne qualified, advancing through local qualifying, for the 2018 U.S. Open at Shinnecock Hills, New York, where he finished low amateur tied 48th, 15 strokes behind winner Brooks Koepka. Gagne also qualified, via sectional qualifying at Bowling Green, Florida, for the 2019 U.S. Open at Pebble Beach, California, where he missed the cut.

He finished runner-up at both the 2019 Latin America Amateur Championship and the 2019 Abierto Sudamericano Amateur.

Gagne turned professional in June 2019, the day after he helped the international team beat the United States team at the 2019 Arnold Palmer Cup.

He was ranked 29th in the World Amateur Golf Rankings upon turning professional.

== Professional career ==
In March 2021, Gagne won the PGA Tour Canada Qualifying School wire-to-wire at Mission Inn Club and Resort, Florida, with a 3-shot-margin in a 106-man-field, securing his card for the entire season.

Gagne qualified for the 2021 U.S. Open at Torrey Pines, California, his third start in the championship. He missed the cut by four strokes.

In November 2021, he earned exempt status on the 2022 Korn Ferry Tour at the final stage qualifying tournament at the Landings Club in Savannah, Georgia. He played 22 tournaments on the 2022 Korn Ferry Tour, making the cut in ten, with a best finish of tied 21st and ended the season ranked 124th.

He finished tied 6th at the Elk Ridge Saskatchewan Open in June 2023 on the PGA Tour Canada at Waskesiu Lake, Saskatchewan.

== Amateur wins ==
- 2012 AJGA Nebraska Junior @ Quarry Oaks
- 2016 Maui Jim Intercollegiate, David Toms Intercollegiate
- 2017 David Toms Intercollegiate

== Results in major championships ==
Tournament	2018	2019	2020	2021
Masters Tournament				
PGA Championship				
U.S. Open	T48LA	CUT		CUT
The Open Championship			NT	

Did not play

LA = Low amateur
CUT = missed the half-way cut
"T" = tied
NT = No tournament due to COVID-19 pandemic

== Team appearances ==
Amateur

- Arnold Palmer Cup (representing International team): 2018, 2019 (winners)
- Eisenhower Trophy (representing Costa Rica): 2018
