= Dylan Meyer =

Dylan Meyer may refer to:

- Dylan Meyer (golfer) (born 1995), American professional golfer
- Dylan Meyer (screenwriter) (born 1987), American screenwriter and film producer

== See also ==
- Dylan Meier (1984–2010), American football player
