= Matt Parziale =

American golfer (born 1987)

Personal information
- Full name: Matthew Parziale
- Nationality: United States
- Born: June 5, 1987 (age 39) Brockton, Massachusetts, U.S.

Career
- Sport: Golf
- College: Southeastern University
- Turned professional: 2009 re-instated amateur 2012

Best results in major championships
- Masters Tournament: CUT: 2018
- PGA Championship: DNP
- U.S. Open: T48: 2018
- The Open Championship: DNP

Matthew Parziale (born June 5, 1987) is an American amateur golfer and winner of the 2017 U.S. Mid-Amateur.

== Golf career ==
Parziale played his college golf for Southeastern University. As a sophomore, he led the Fire to the 2007 NCCAA national title. After college, Parziale played professional golf for three years, but struggled to make a living and regained his amateur status in 2012.

Parziale competed in the 2016 U.S. Mid-Amateur championship where he posted rounds of 72-74 (+6) and advanced to the match play portion of the tournament. In his first match he played #26 seed Trevor Randolph and was defeated 4 and 3.

In 2017, Parziale won the Massachusetts State Amateur Championship for the first time by defeating Matt Cowgill in the 36-hole final, 4 and 3. Later in the year Parziale won the 2017 U.S. Mid-Amateur by defeating Josh Nichols, 8 and 6 in the final.

As U.S. Mid-Amateur champion, Parziale was invited to the 2018 Masters Tournament, where he missed the cut after shooting 81-79 (+16). Parziale also was exempt into the 2018 U.S. Open, where he tied for 48th place and tied for low-amateur for the tournament with rounds of 74-73-74-75 (+16). After the 2018 U.S. Open, Parziale played in the Massachusetts State Amateur Championship where he scored rounds of 70-70 (E) during the stroke play portion. In the first round of match play he defeated #24 seed Steven DiLisio, 5 and 3. In the round of 16 he beat #8 seed Matt Cowgill, 3 and 2. During the quarter-finals he matched up against #16 seed Patrick Frodigh and lost 3 and 2. He competed at the 2018 U.S. Amateur later in the year and shot rounds of 78-78 (+13) and failed to reach match play. As defending champion, Parziale competed in the 2018 U.S. Mid-Amateur where he T-26th in stroke play after shooting 76-68 (+2) and qualified for match play as the #34 seed. In the first round he faced #31 seed Andres Schonbaum and lost 3 and 2.

Parziale qualified for 2019 U.S. Open after finishing second, 1-over (142 strokes) in 36 total holes, in the Purchase, New York Sectional Qualifying Tournament. At the championship, he missed the cut by 7 strokes after shooting 74-77 (+9). Parziale was invited to the 2019 Porter Cup in Lewiston, New York. He shot rounds of 73-67-65-70 (−13) and T-5th in the tournament. Parziale competed at the 2019 Massachusetts State Amateur Championship. He shot rounds of 75-73 (+6) and qualified for match play as the #32 seed. In the first round he defeated #1 seed Herbie Aikens, 3 and 1. In the round of 16, Parziale defeated Cody Booska, 7 and 6. In his quarterfinal match, he lost to eventual champion Steve DiLisio, 7 and 6. He competed at the 2019 U.S. Amateur at Pinehurst #2 and #4 and missed match play after opening with rounds of 72-80 (+12). In the fall of 2019, Parziale competed in the U.S. Mid-Amateur where he shot rounds of 70-72 (E) to T-13th and qualify for match play for the fourth year in a row. In match play, he lost to Jeremy Gearheart, 4 and 3, in the first round.

In 2020, Parziale won the Brockton City Open with rounds of 67-67 (−8). At the 2020 Massachusetts State Amateur Championship he posted scores of 69-70 (−3) in the stroke play portion and earned the #2 seed going into match play. In round 1, he defeated #31 seed Tommy Parker, 1 up. In the round of 16, he was matched against #15 seed Chris Tarallo and beat him 4 and 3. In the quarter-finals he defeated #7 seed Weston Jones, 3 and 2. He was defeated in the semi-finals by #14 seed Nick Maccario, 1 up. Later in the summer, Parziale earned an exemption into the U.S. Amateur where he shot rounds of 80-77 (+14) and did not advance to match play. At the 2020 Massachusetts Mid-Amateur Championship, Parziale was attempting to win for the third time. He posted rounds of 67-68-75 (−6) and went into a playoff with Arthur Zenneti where he was defeated.

During the 2021 season, Parziale competed in the Massachusetts State Amateur Championship where he defeated Kevin Gately 3 and 2, Frank Vana III 5 and 4, Ben Spitz 2 and 1 and Christopher Bornhurst 4 and 3 en route to the finals. In the finals he met Michael Thornbjornsen and was defeated 8 and 6. Later in the year, he competed in the Massachusetts Mid-Amateur Championship, where he shot 69-69 (−6) en route to his third victory in this event.

In 2022, Parziale competed in the Massachusetts State Amateur Championship and shot rounds of 75-73 (+8) in stroke play. He qualified for match play as the #29 seed an met Rickey Stimets in the opening round. He was defeated in 19 holes.

During the 2023 season, Parziale competed in the Massachusetts State Amateur Championship. He shot rounds of 71-72 (+3) to qualify for match play as the #18 seed. He beat Ben Kelly in the first round 3&2. In the second round he was defeated 2&1 by Joseph Lenane.

Parziale competed in the 2024 Massachusetts State Amateur Championship. He shot rounds of 73-72 (+1) and qualified for marhcplay as the #28 seed. In matchplay he defeated Mike Calef 4 and 3, Weston Jones 3 and 1 and Aidan O'Donovan 3 and 2 before being defeated in the semi finals by #32 Matthew Naumec 4 and 3.

== Personal life ==
Parziale served as a firefighter in Brockton, Massachusetts until 2019, when he left to become an insurance broker.

== Amateur wins ==
- 2008 Worcester County Amateur
- 2009 New England Amateur, Ouimet Memorial
- 2013 Ouimet Memorial
- 2015 Massachusetts Mid-Amateur Championship, Worcester County Amateur, Norfolk County Classic
- 2016 Massachusetts Mid-Amateur Championship
- 2017 U.S. Mid-Amateur, Massachusetts Amateur, Ouimet Memorial
- 2020 Brockton City Open
- 2021 Massachusetts Mid-Amateur Championship
- 2025 Ouimet Memorial

== Results in major championships ==
Results not in chronological order before 2019.

Tournament	2018	2019
Masters Tournament	CUT	
PGA Championship		
U.S. Open	T48LA	CUT
The Open Championship		

Did not play

LA = low amateur
CUT = missed the half-way cut
"T" = tied for place
