= Harry Ellis (golfer) =

English male golfer

Personal information
- Full name: Harry Jack Ellis
- Nationality: England
- Born: 10 September 1995 (age 31) Southampton, England

Career
- Sport: Golf
- College: Florida State University
- Turned professional: 2018
- Current tour: Clutch Pro Tour
- Professional wins: 2

Best results in major championships
- Masters Tournament: CUT: 2018
- PGA Championship: DNP
- U.S. Open: CUT: 2018
- The Open Championship: CUT: 2017

Harry Jack Ellis (born 10 September 1995) is an English professional golfer.

In 2012, Ellis became the youngest winner of the English Amateur at the age of 16, beating the previous record held by Nick Faldo. As a junior, at Florida State University, Ellis was named a PING honorable mention All-American.

In 2017, Ellis won The Amateur Championship, becoming just the third player to win both the English Amateur and The Amateur Championship, joining Michael Bonallack and Michael Lunt. The win gained him entry to the 2017 Open Championship, the 2018 Masters Tournament, the 2018 Memorial Tournament, and the 2018 U.S. Open.

Following the 2018 U.S. Open, Ellis turned professional on the Challenge Tour.

== Amateur wins ==
- 2012 English Amateur
- 2016 Lagonda Trophy
- 2017 The Amateur Championship, Marquette Intercollegiate Championship
- 2018 Mobile Sports Authority Intercollegiate, Georgia Cup

== Professional wins (2) ==
=== Clutch Pro Tour wins (1) ===
No.	Date	Tournament	Winning score	Margin of victory	Runner-up
1	30 May 2025	Stromberg Masters	−12 (68-67-66=201)	1 stroke	(Northern Ireland) John-Ross Galbraith

=== Other wins (1) ===
- 2020 Memorial Olivier Barras

== Results in major championships ==
Tournament	2017	2018
Masters Tournament		CUT
U.S. Open		CUT
The Open Championship	CUT	
PGA Championship		

Did not play

CUT = missed the half-way cut

== Team appearances ==
- Jacques Léglise Trophy (representing Great Britain and Ireland): 2012
- European Amateur Team Championship (representing England): 2017
- Arnold Palmer Cup (representing Europe): 2017
- Walker Cup (representing Great Britain & Ireland): 2017
