= 2018 U.S. Open (golf) =

2018 Golf Major in Shinnecock Hills, New York

Tournament information
- Dates: June 14–17, 2018
- Location: Shinnecock Hills, New York; 40.894°N 72.440°W
- Course: Shinnecock Hills Golf Club
- Organized by: USGA
- Tours: PGA Tour; European Tour; Japan Golf Tour

Statistics
- Par: 70
- Length: 7,440 yards (6,803 m)
- Field: 156 players, 67 after cut
- Cut: 148 (+8)
- Prize fund: $12,000,000 €10,244,150
- Winner's share: $2,160,000 €1,843,947

Champion
- (United States) Brooks Koepka
- 281 (+1)
- Location in the United States Location in New York

The 2018 United States Open Championship was the 118th U.S. Open, held June 14–17 at Shinnecock Hills Golf Club in Shinnecock Hills, New York, about eighty miles (130 km) east of New York City on Long Island. It was the fifth U.S. Open held at this course (2004, 1995, 1986, 1896).

One of four co-leaders after 54 holes, defending champion Brooks Koepka shot 68 in the final round for 281 (+1) to win consecutive U.S. Opens, one stroke ahead of runner-up Tommy Fleetwood, who closed with the sixth 63 in U.S. Open history. Koepka became the third to successfully defend the title since World War II, following Ben Hogan (1951) and Curtis Strange (1989).

The USGA changed the playoff format in February, from a full round (18 holes) to two holes, followed by sudden-death, if needed. The last 18-hole playoff was a decade earlier in 2008, won by Tiger Woods on the first sudden-death hole.

== Venue ==
=== Course layout ===
Hole	Name	Yards	Par	Hole	Name	Yards	Par
1	Westward Ho	399	4	10	Eastward Ho	415	4
2	Plateau	252	3	11	Hill Head	159	3
3	Peconic	500	4	12	Tuckahoe	469	4
4	Pump House	475	4	13	Road Side	374	4
5	Montauk	589	5	14	Thom's Elbow	519	4
6	Pond	491	4	15	Sebonac	409	4
7	Redan	189	3	16	Shinnecock	616	5
8	Lowlands	439	4	17	Eden	175	3
9	Ben Nevis	485	4	18	Home	485	4
Out		3,819	35	In		3,621	35
Source:				Total		7,440	70

Lengths of the course for previous major championships:

- 6,996 yards (6,397 m), par 70 - 2004 U.S. Open
- 6,944 yards (6,350 m), par 70 - 1995 U.S. Open
- 6,912 yards (6,320 m), par 70 - 1986 U.S. Open
- 4,423 yards (4,044 m), - 1896 U.S. Open

2018 yardages by round

Round	Hole	1	2	3	4	5	6	7	8	9	Out	10	11	12	13	14	15	16	17	18	In	Total
	Par	4	3	4	4	5	4	3	4	4	35	4	3	4	4	4	4	5	3	4	35	70
1	Yards	407	252	510	478	592	452	184	439	487	3,801	418	157	462	374	536	404	620	185	491	3,647	7,448
2	Yards	411	234	499	476	583	492	184	448	482	3,809	404	153	476	360	511	420	610	169	490	3,593	7,402
3	Yards	409	239	495	481	591	486	166	448	486	3,801	416	159	465	366	529	416	627	150	485	3,613	7,414
4	Yards	399	264	495	471	597	494	180	435	478	3,813	411	159	472	367	512	408	621	182	486	3,618	7,431

- Scoring average: 74.650
  - by round: 76.474, 73.595, 75.327, 72.180
- Most difficult holes in relation to par: 14, 3, 2, 10

== Field ==
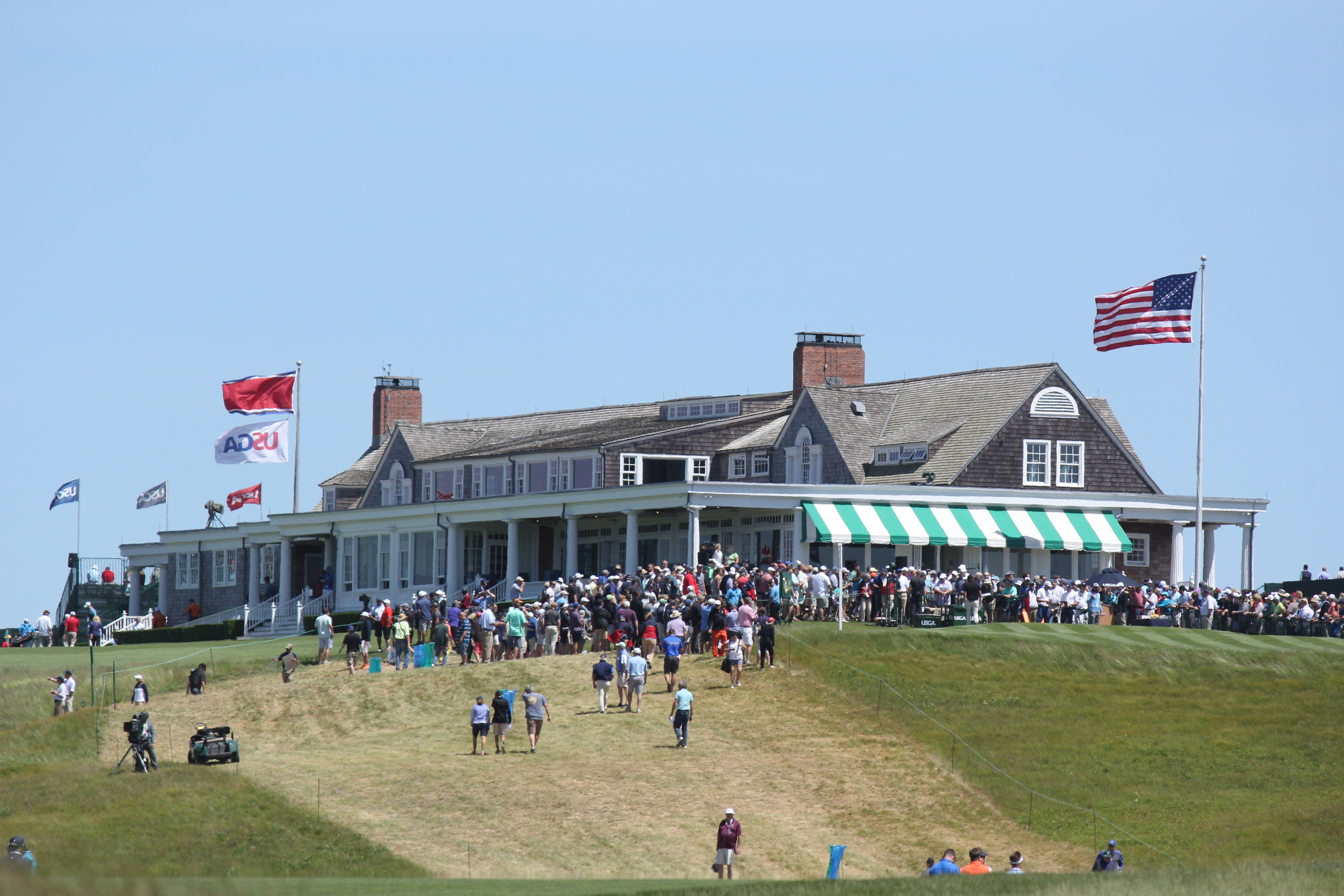
The first tee and clubhouse at Shinnecock Hills

About half the field consisted of players who were exempt from qualifying for the U.S. Open. Each player is classified according to the first category in which he qualified, and other categories are shown in parentheses.

1. Winners of the U.S. Open Championship during the last ten years

- Lucas Glover
- Dustin Johnson (12,13,14)
- Martin Kaymer
- Brooks Koepka (11,12,13,14)
- Graeme McDowell
- Rory McIlroy (6,7,13,14)
- Justin Rose (12,13,14)
- Webb Simpson (8,12,13,14)
- Jordan Spieth (5,6,12,13,14)
- Tiger Woods

2. Winner and runner-up of the 2017 U.S. Amateur, winner of the 2017 U.S. Junior Amateur and 2017 U.S. Mid-Amateur

- Doug Ghim (a)
- Noah Goodwin (a)
- Matt Parziale (a)
- Doc Redman forfeited his exemption as winner of the U.S. Amateur by turning professional in May 2018.

3. Winner of the 2017 Amateur Championship

- Harry Ellis (a)

4. Winner of the 2017 Mark H. McCormack Medal (men's World Amateur Golf Ranking)

- Joaquín Niemann forfeited his exemption by turning professional.

5. Winners of the Masters Tournament during the last five years

- Sergio García (12,13,14)
- Patrick Reed (12,13,14)
- Bubba Watson (13,14)
- Danny Willett

6. Winners of The Open Championship during the last five years

- Zach Johnson (13,14)
- Phil Mickelson (13,14)
- Henrik Stenson (13,14)

7. Winners of the PGA Championship during the last five years

- Jason Day (8,12,13,14)
- Jason Dufner (12,13,14)
- Justin Thomas (11,12,13,14)
- Jimmy Walker (13,14)

8. Winners of The Players Championship during the last three years

- Kim Si-woo (13,14)

9. Winner of the 2018 European Tour BMW PGA Championship

- Francesco Molinari (13,14)

10. Winner of the 2017 U.S. Senior Open Championship

- Kenny Perry

11. The 10 lowest scorers and anyone tying for 10th place at the 2017 U.S. Open Championship

- Tommy Fleetwood (13,14)
- Rickie Fowler (12,13,14)
- Bill Haas
- Brian Harman (12,13,14)
- Charley Hoffman (12,13,14)
- Hideki Matsuyama (12,13,14)
- Trey Mullinax
- Xander Schauffele (12,13,14)
- Brandt Snedeker

12. Players who qualified for the season-ending 2017 Tour Championship

- Daniel Berger (13,14)
- Patrick Cantlay (13,14)
- Paul Casey (13,14)
- Kevin Chappell (13,14)
- Tony Finau (13,14)
- Adam Hadwin (13,14)
- Russell Henley (13,14)
- Kevin Kisner (13,14)
- Matt Kuchar (13,14)
- Marc Leishman (13,14)
- Pat Perez (13,14)
- Jon Rahm (13,14)
- Kyle Stanley (13,14)
- Jhonattan Vegas
- Gary Woodland (13,14)

13. The top 60 point leaders and ties as of May 21, 2018, in the Official World Golf Ranking

- Kiradech Aphibarnrat (14)
- Rafa Cabrera-Bello (14)
- Bryson DeChambeau (14)
- Ross Fisher (14)
- Matt Fitzpatrick (14)
- Dylan Frittelli
- Branden Grace (14)
- Chesson Hadley
- Tyrrell Hatton (14)
- Charles Howell III (14)
- Satoshi Kodaira (14)
- Alexander Lévy (14)
- Li Haotong (14)
- Luke List (14)
- Alex Norén (14)
- Louis Oosthuizen (14)
- Ian Poulter (14)
- Chez Reavie (14)
- Charl Schwartzel (14)
- Cameron Smith (14)
- Brendan Steele (14)
- Peter Uihlein (14)

14. The top 60 point leaders and ties as of June 11, 2018, in the Official World Golf Ranking

- An Byeong-hun
- Emiliano Grillo

15. Special exemptions given by the USGA

- Ernie Els
- Jim Furyk

The remaining contestants earned their places through sectional qualifiers.

- Japan: Shota Akiyoshi, David Bransdon, Liang Wenchong
- England: Dean Burmester, Ryan Fox, Scott Gregory, Andrew Johnston, Tom Lewis, James Morrison, Thorbjørn Olesen, Matthieu Pavon, Richie Ramsay, Kristoffer Reitan (a), Jason Scrivener, Matthew Southgate, Matt Wallace, Paul Waring
- United States

- Daly City, California: Shintaro Ban (a), Franklin Huang (a,L), Park Sung-joon, Rhett Rasmussen (a,L), Kevin Yu (a)
- Jupiter, Florida: Luis Gagne (a,L), Tyler Strafaci (a,L), Richy Werenski
- Roswell, Georgia: Roberto Castro, Michael Hebert (L), Garrett Rank (a,L)
- Rockville, Maryland: Mickey DeMorat (L), Cole Miller (L), Sebastián Muñoz, Tim Wilkinson
- Summit, New Jersey: Stewart Hagestad (a), Calum Hill, Theo Humphrey (a), Michael Miller (L), Cameron Wilson
- Columbus, Ohio: Aaron Baddeley, Keegan Bradley, Brian Gay, Im Sung-jae, Russell Knox, Shane Lowry, Ryan Lumsden (a,L), Michael Putnam, Patrick Rodgers, Ollie Schniederjans, Adam Scott, Shubhankar Sharma, Harold Varner III, Will Zalatoris
- Springfield, Ohio: David Gazzolo (L), Will Grimmer (a,L), Dylan Meyer (L), Brian Stuard, Timothy Wiseman (a,L)
- Portland, Oregon: Chris Babcock (L), Michael Block (L), Lucas Herbert, Sulman Raza (L)
- Memphis, Tennessee: Eric Axley, Sam Burns, Tyler Duncan, Lanto Griffin, Mackenzie Hughes, Matt Jones, Scott Stallings, Steve Stricker, Braden Thornberry (a), Sebastián Vázquez (L), Aaron Wise
- Richmond, Texas: Philip Barbaree (a), Jacob Bergeron (a), Chris Naegel (L)

Alternates who gained entry:

- Ryan Evans (England) – claimed spot held for category 14
- Rikuya Hoshino (Japan) – claimed spot held for category 14
- Scott Piercy (Memphis) – claimed spot held for category 14
- Ted Potter Jr. (Columbus) – claimed spot held for category 14

(a) denotes amateur
(L) denotes player advanced through local qualifying

== Round summaries ==
=== First round ===
Thursday, June 14, 2018

Conditions were extremely difficult as gusty winds hung around all day with sunny skies, making the course firm and fast. Only four players broke par, including Dustin Johnson, one of the tournament favorites. The scoring average for the round was 76.47.

Place	Player	Score	To par
T1	(United States) Russell Henley	69	−1
T1	(United States) Dustin Johnson	69	−1
T1	(United States) Scott Piercy	69	−1
T1	(England) Ian Poulter	69	−1
5	(United States) Jason Dufner	70	E
T6	(South Korea) An Byeong-hun	71	+1
T6	(United States) Sam Burns	71	+1
T6	(United States) Charley Hoffman	71	+1
T6	(United States) Charles Howell III	71	+1
T6	(France) Matthieu Pavon	71	+1
T6	(England) Justin Rose	71	+1
T6	(Sweden) Henrik Stenson	71	+1

=== Second round ===
Friday, June 15, 2018

Dustin Johnson held the lead after shooting a 67, four shots ahead of Charley Hoffman and Scott Piercy.

Place	Player	Score	To par
1	(United States) Dustin Johnson	69-67=136	−4
T2	(United States) Charley Hoffman	71-69=140	E
T2	(United States) Scott Piercy	69-71=140	E
T4	(England) Tommy Fleetwood	75-66=141	+1
T4	(Sweden) Henrik Stenson	71-70=141	+1
T4	(England) Justin Rose	71-70=141	+1
T4	(United States) Brooks Koepka	75-66=141	+1
T4	(England) Ian Poulter	69-72=141	+1
T9	(United States) Rickie Fowler	73-69=142	+2
T9	(United States) Russell Henley	69-73=142	+2

Amateurs: Grimmer (+5), Gagne (+7), Parziale (+7), Thornberry (+9), Strafaci (+10), Ghim (+13), Rasmussen (+14), Hagestad (+15), Bergeron (+16), Humphrey (+16), Yu (+17), Huang (+18), Lumsden (+18), Rank (+18), Reitan (+18), Wiseman (+18), Ban (+19), Ellis (+19), Goodwin (+19), Barbaree (+21)

=== Third round ===
Saturday, June 16, 2018

Second round leader Dustin Johnson shot a seven-over 77 to fall into a four-way tie with Daniel Berger, Tony Finau and defending champion Brooks Koepka. Johnson double bogeyed the par-3 2nd and went six-over on the front-nine. He made his only birdie of the round at the 11th to get back to the top of the leaderboard, but three-putted for bogey on 18 to settle for a share of the 54-hole lead. Berger and Finau began the round in 45th place and 11 shots behind, but each shot 66 (−4) for the low round of the day.

Scoring conditions got more difficult as the day went on. Koepka's two-over 72 was the lowest score among the final four groups. Only three rounds in the 60s were recorded, two of them by Berger and Finau. The scoring average for the round was 75.3.

Phil Mickelson incurred a two-shot penalty on the 13th when he walked after his ball which was running slowly away from the hole after his putt and deliberately hit the ball backwards towards the hole while it was still moving. He ended up shooting 81 (+11), equalling his highest score at the U.S. Open.

Place	Player	Score	To par
T1	(United States) Daniel Berger	76-71-66=213	+3
T1	(United States) Tony Finau	75-72-66=213	+3
T1	(United States) Dustin Johnson	69-67-77=213	+3
T1	(United States) Brooks Koepka	75-66-72=213	+3
5	(England) Justin Rose	71-70-73=214	+4
6	(Sweden) Henrik Stenson	71-70-74=215	+5
T7	(Thailand) Kiradech Aphibarnrat	76-72-68=216	+6
T7	(United States) Jim Furyk	73-71-72=216	+6
T7	(United States) Patrick Reed	73-72-71=216	+6
T10	(United States) Brian Gay	73-74-70=217	+7
T10	(South Africa) Branden Grace	76-69-72=217	+7
T10	(England) Tyrrell Hatton	75-70-72=217	+7
T10	(United States) Charley Hoffman	71-69-77=217	+7
T10	(United States) Dylan Meyer	77-69-71=217	+7
T10	(England) Ian Poulter	69-72-76=217	+7

Amateurs: Parziale (+11), Gagne (+12), Grimmer (+13)

=== Final round ===
Sunday, June 17, 2018

==== Summary ====
Brooks Koepka shot a final round 68 (−2) to finish one ahead of Tommy Fleetwood and win the U.S. Open for the second straight year. He was the first to successfully defend the title in 29 years, since Curtis Strange in 1989.

Koepka began the round in a four-way tie for the lead with Dustin Johnson, Daniel Berger, and Tony Finau. He got off to a good start with birdies on three of his first five holes to get to even par and take the lead. At the par-3 11th, his tee shot went into the rough over the green. After chipping into a greenside bunker, he holed a 12-foot (3.7 m) putt to save bogey. At the following hole, he made a six-foot par putt, then at the 14th he got up-and-down to save par from short of the green with an eight-foot putt. Hitting his approach at the par-5 16th to within four feet, he made the birdie to open up a two-shot lead. Despite a bogey at the 18th, Koepka held on win by one.

Fleetwood shot the sixth round of 63 in U.S. Open history to finish in second. He began the round six behind and began by sinking a putt from 56 feet (17 m) at the 2nd and three more birdies on the front-nine. He made four straight birdies on holes 12–15, with putts of 17 feet (5 m) at 12, 20 feet (6 m) at 14, and 29 feet (9 m) at 15. Fleetwood had an eight-foot putt at the 18th for the first 62 in U.S. Open history, but it slid past the hole that would have forced the first two-hole playoff.

Johnson made birdie at the 5th but three-putted for bogey at the 7th, 11th, 14th, and 17th. He birdied the last to shoot an even-par 70 and finish two shots behind Koepka. Finau bogeyed three of his first four holes but got back to even for the round with a 26-foot birdie at the 11th. He came to the 18th two back of Koepka but made double bogey and ended up in fifth place, four behind. Berger also started his round with two bogeys and finished with a three-over 73 to tie for sixth. Patrick Reed began three shots behind but birdied his first three holes and five of the first seven to tie for the lead. He made four bogeys the rest of the round, however, to fall back to fourth place.

With the win, Koepka becomes the seventh player to win consecutive U.S. Opens, and the first since Curtis Strange in 1989.

==== Final leaderboard ====
Champion
Silver Cup winner (leading amateurs)
(a) = amateur
(c) = past champion

Place	Player	Score	To par	Money ($)
1	(United States) Brooks Koepka (c)	75-66-72-68=281	+1	2,160,000
2	(England) Tommy Fleetwood	75-66-78-63=282	+2	1,296,000
3	(United States) Dustin Johnson (c)	69-67-77-70=283	+3	812,927
4	(United States) Patrick Reed	73-72-71-68=284	+4	569,884
5	(United States) Tony Finau	75-72-66-72=285	+5	474,659
T6	(United States) Daniel Berger	76-71-66-73=286	+6	361,923
T6	(England) Tyrrell Hatton	75-70-72-69=286	+6	361,923
T6	(United States) Xander Schauffele	72-74-72-68=286	+6	361,923
T6	(Sweden) Henrik Stenson	71-70-74-71=286	+6	361,923
T10	(England) Justin Rose (c)	71-70-73-73=287	+7	270,151
T10	(United States) Webb Simpson (c)	76-71-71-69=287	+7	270,151

Leaderboard below the top 10
Place	Player	Score	To par	Money ($)
T12	(England) Matt Fitzpatrick	73-70-75-70=288	+8	221,825
T12	(United States) Zach Johnson	73-73-72-70=288	+8	221,825
T12	(Scotland) Russell Knox	73-71-75-69=288	+8	221,825
15	(Thailand) Kiradech Aphibarnrat	76-72-68-73=289	+9	190,328
T16	(England) Paul Casey	73-73-73-71=290	+10	163,435
T16	(China) Li Haotong	79-68-74-69=290	+10	163,435
T16	(Japan) Hideki Matsuyama	75-70-79-66=290	+10	163,435
T16	(South Africa) Louis Oosthuizen	74-72-75-69=290	+10	163,435
T20	(United States) Rickie Fowler	73-69-84-65=291	+11	122,387
T20	(United States) Brian Gay	73-74-70-74=291	+11	122,387
T20	(United States) Charley Hoffman	71-69-77-74=291	+11	122,387
T20	(United States) Dylan Meyer	77-69-71-74=291	+11	122,387
T20	(United States) Steve Stricker	73-75-73-70=291	+11	122,387
T25	(Australia) Aaron Baddeley	74-72-77-69=292	+12	79,200
T25	(United States) Bryson DeChambeau	76-69-73-74=292	+12	79,200
T25	(United States) Jason Dufner	70-74-79-69=292	+12	79,200
T25	(South Africa) Branden Grace	76-69-72-75=292	+12	79,200
T25	(United States) Russell Henley	69-73-77-73=292	+12	79,200
T25	(United States) Charles Howell III	71-72-77-72=292	+12	79,200
T25	(Italy) Francesco Molinari	75-72-72-73=292	+12	79,200
T25	(Sweden) Alex Norén	72-72-77-71=292	+12	79,200
T25	(France) Matthieu Pavon	71-77-74-70=292	+12	79,200
T25	(England) Ian Poulter	69-72-76-75=292	+12	79,200
T25	(United States) Justin Thomas	74-70-74-74=292	+12	79,200
T36	(Spain) Rafa Cabrera-Bello	73-71-76-73=293	+13	54,054
T36	(United States) Bill Haas	76-72-74-71=293	+13	54,054
T36	(United States) Brian Harman	74-70-78-71=293	+13	54,054
T36	(United States) Pat Perez	73-71-77-72=293	+13	54,054
T36	(United States) Gary Woodland	79-69-70-75=293	+13	54,054
T41	(United States) Sam Burns	71-76-75-72=294	+14	43,028
T41	(New Zealand) Ryan Fox	73-72-74-75=294	+14	43,028
T41	(United States) Patrick Rodgers	72-72-83-67=294	+14	43,028
T41	(Venezuela) Jhonattan Vegas	76-72-73-73=294	+14	43,028
T45	(United States) Patrick Cantlay	75-71-76-73=295	+15	34,716
T45	(Australia) Marc Leishman	74-69-78-74=295	+15	34,716
T45	(United States) Scott Piercy	69-71-79-76=295	+15	34,716
T48	(England) Ross Fisher	76-71-79-70=296	+16	27,952
T48	(United States) Jim Furyk (c)	73-71-72-80=296	+16	27,952
T48	(Costa Rica) Luis Gagne (a)	73-74-75-74=296	+16	0
T48	(United States) Phil Mickelson	77-69-81-69=296	+16	27,952
T48	(United States) Matt Parziale (a)	74-73-74-75=296	+16	0
T48	(United States) Brandt Snedeker	72-76-73-75=296	+16	27,952
T48	(United States) Peter Uihlein	75-72-75-74=296	+16	27,952
T48	(New Zealand) Tim Wilkinson	76-72-78-70=296	+16	27,952
T56	(South Africa) Dean Burmester	75-73-75-74=297	+17	25,426
T56	(United States) Tyler Duncan	77-67-81-72=297	+17	25,426
T56	(United States) Mickey DeMorat	72-72-80-73=297	+17	25,426
T56	(United States) Chris Naegel	73-73-75-76=297	+17	25,426
T56	(United States) Jimmy Walker	75-70-79-73=297	+17	25,426
61	(Scotland) Calum Hill	75-69-81-73=298	+18	24,629
62	(England) Andrew Johnston	73-73-82-71=299	+19	24,448
63	(United States) Brendan Steele	72-73-75-80=300	+20	24,203
64	(United States) Cameron Wilson	75-73-76-77=301	+21	23,959
65	(United States) Kevin Chappell	75-72-78-77=302	+22	23,714
66	(United States) Will Grimmer (a)	73-72-78-80=303	+23	0
67	(South Korea) An Byeong-hun	71-76-81-78=306	+26	23,470
CUT	(United States) Eric Axley	73-76=149	+9	
CUT	(United States) Roberto Castro	75-74=149	+9	
CUT	(United States) Lucas Glover (c)	77-72=149	+9	
CUT	(United States) Lanto Griffin	76-73=149	+9	
CUT	(Argentina) Emiliano Grillo	76-73=149	+9	
CUT	(South Korea) Im Sung-jae	76-73=149	+9	
CUT	(South Korea) Kim Si-woo	73-76=149	+9	
CUT	(Northern Ireland) Graeme McDowell (c)	79-70=149	+9	
CUT	(Denmark) Thorbjørn Olesen	76-73=149	+9	
CUT	(United States) Chez Reavie	75-74=149	+9	
CUT	(Australia) Jason Scrivener	78-71=149	+9	
CUT	(England) Matthew Southgate	77-72=149	+9	
CUT	(United States) Jordan Spieth (c)	78-71=149	+9	
CUT	(United States) Braden Thornberry (a)	76-73=149	+9	
CUT	(England) Matt Wallace	77-72=149	+9	
CUT	(Australia) Matt Jones	76-74=150	+10	
CUT	(Northern Ireland) Rory McIlroy (c)	80-70=150	+10	
CUT	(India) Shubhankar Sharma	74-76=150	+10	
CUT	(United States) Tyler Strafaci (a)	78-72=150	+10	
CUT	(United States) Brian Stuard	74-76=150	+10	
CUT	(Mexico) Sebastián Vázquez	77-73=150	+10	
CUT	(United States) Tiger Woods (c)	78-72=150	+10	
CUT	(United States) Chesson Hadley	76-75=151	+11	
CUT	(Canada) Mackenzie Hughes	76-75=151	+11	
CUT	(England) Tom Lewis	79-72=151	+11	
CUT	(Colombia) Sebastián Muñoz	80-71=151	+11	
CUT	(Australia) Cameron Smith	79-72=151	+11	
CUT	(United States) Bubba Watson	77-74=151	+11	
CUT	(United States) Aaron Wise	77-74=151	+11	
CUT	(United States) Will Zalatoris	80-71=151	+11	
CUT	(Australia) Jason Day	79-73=152	+12	
CUT	(United States) Kevin Kisner	77-75=152	+12	
CUT	(United States) Matt Kuchar	74-78=152	+12	
CUT	(United States) Luke List	75-77=152	+12	
CUT	(United States) Cole Miller	78-74=152	+12	
CUT	(United States) Ollie Schniederjans	76-76=152	+12	
CUT	(South Africa) Charl Schwartzel	79-73=152	+12	
CUT	(England) Danny Willett	75-77=152	+12	
CUT	(Australia) David Bransdon	79-74=153	+13	
CUT	(United States) Doug Ghim (a)	79-74=153	+13	
CUT	(United States) Trey Mullinax	79-74=153	+13	
CUT	(South Korea) Park Sung-joon	81-72=153	+13	
CUT	(Scotland) Richie Ramsay	77-76=153	+13	
CUT	(Australia) Adam Scott	78-75=153	+13	
CUT	(United States) Chris Babcock	78-76=154	+14	
CUT	(Spain) Sergio García	75-79=154	+14	
CUT	(Republic of Ireland) Shane Lowry	75-79=154	+14	
CUT	(United States) Ted Potter Jr.	76-78=154	+14	
CUT	(United States) Michael Putnam	78-76=154	+14	
CUT	(United States) Rhett Rasmussen (a)	80-74=154	+14	
CUT	(United States) Scott Stallings	80-74=154	+14	
CUT	(United States) Kyle Stanley	75-79=154	+14	
CUT	(United States) Harold Varner III	79-75=154	+14	
CUT	(England) Paul Waring	78-76=154	+14	
CUT	(United States) Keegan Bradley	81-74=155	+15	
CUT	(United States) Stewart Hagestad (a)	81-74=155	+15	
CUT	(China) Liang Wenchong	79-76=155	+15	
CUT	(United States) Michael Miller	77-78=155	+15	
CUT	(Spain) Jon Rahm	78-77=155	+15	
CUT	(United States) Jacob Bergeron (a)	81-75=156	+16	
CUT	(England) Ryan Evans	78-78=156	+16	
CUT	(United States) Theo Humphrey (a)	84-72=156	+16	
CUT	(United States) Richy Werenski	76-80=156	+16	
CUT	(South Africa) Ernie Els (c)	78-79=157	+17	
CUT	(United States) David Gazzolo	76-81=157	+17	
CUT	(Australia) Lucas Herbert	83-74=157	+17	
CUT	(France) Alexander Lévy	77-80=157	+17	
CUT	(Taiwan) Kevin Yu (a)	76-81=157	+17	
CUT	(South Africa) Dylan Frittelli	78-80=158	+18	
CUT	(Canada) Adam Hadwin	83-75=158	+18	
CUT	(Japan) Rikuya Hoshino	79-79=158	+18	
CUT	(United States) Franklin Huang (a)	82-76=158	+18	
CUT	(Germany) Martin Kaymer (c)	83-75=158	+18	
CUT	(Japan) Satoshi Kodaira	81-77=158	+18	
CUT	(Scotland) Ryan Lumsden (a)	82-76=158	+18	
CUT	(England) James Morrison	81-77=158	+18	
CUT	(United States) Kenny Perry	79-79=158	+18	
CUT	(Canada) Garrett Rank (a)	83-75=158	+18	
CUT	(Norway) Kristoffer Reitan (a)	81-77=158	+18	
CUT	(United States) Timothy Wiseman (a)	83-75=158	+18	
CUT	(Japan) Shota Akiyoshi	82-77=159	+19	
CUT	(United States) Shintaro Ban (a)	81-78=159	+19	
CUT	(England) Harry Ellis (a)	80-79=159	+19	
CUT	(United States) Noah Goodwin (a)	81-78=159	+19	
CUT	(United States) Sulman Raza	82-77=159	+19	
CUT	(United States) Michael Hebert	87-73=160	+20	
CUT	(United States) Philip Barbaree (a)	82-79=161	+21	
CUT	(United States) Michael Block	85-78=163	+23	
CUT	(England) Scott Gregory	92-75=167	+27	

==== Scorecard ====
Final round

Hole	1	2	3	4	5	6	7	8	9	10	11	12	13	14	15	16	17	18
Par	4	3	4	4	5	4	3	4	4	4	3	4	4	4	4	5	3	4
(United States) Koepka	+3	+2	+1	+1	E	+1	+1	+1	+1	E	+1	+1	+1	+1	+1	E	E	+1
(England) Fleetwood	+9	+8	+7	+7	+7	+6	+5	+5	+6	+6	+6	+5	+4	+3	+2	+2	+2	+2
(United States) Johnson	+3	+3	+3	+3	+2	+2	+3	+2	+2	+2	+3	+3	+3	+4	+3	+3	+4	+3
(United States) Reed	+5	+4	+3	+3	+2	+2	+1	+1	+2	+2	+3	+4	+4	+4	+3	+3	+3	+4
(United States) Finau	+3	+4	+5	+6	+5	+5	+6	+5	+4	+4	+3	+4	+4	+3	+3	+3	+3	+5
(United States) Berger	+3	+4	+5	+5	+4	+5	+5	+5	+5	+4	+4	+4	+4	+4	+5	+5	+6	+6
(England) Hatton	+7	+7	+6	+6	+7	+8	+8	+7	+6	+6	+6	+6	+6	+6	+6	+6	+6	+6
(United States) Schauffele	+7	+6	+6	+6	+7	+7	+7	+6	+6	+7	+7	+6	+6	+6	+6	+6	+6	+6
(Sweden) Stenson	+5	+5	+5	+5	+5	+6	+6	+6	+6	+7	+7	+7	+6	+5	+5	+6	+5	+6
(England) Rose	+4	+4	+4	+6	+7	+6	+6	+6	+6	+6	+6	+5	+5	+6	+6	+6	+7	+7

Cumulative tournament scores, relative to par

Birdie	Bogey	Double bogey

== Media ==
This was the fourth U.S. Open televised by Fox and FS1.
