= Doug Ghim =

American professional golfer (born 1996)

Personal information
- Nationality: United States
- Born: April 16, 1996 (age 30) Des Plaines, Illinois, U.S.

Career
- Sport: Golf
- College: University of Texas
- Turned professional: 2018
- Current tour: PGA Tour
- Former tour: Korn Ferry Tour
- Highest ranking: 90 (November 3, 2024) (as of October 25, 2026)

Best results in major championships
- Masters Tournament: T50: 2018
- PGA Championship: T35: 2024
- U.S. Open: CUT: 2018, 2025
- The Open Championship: DNP

Achievements and awards
- Ben Hogan Award: 2018

Doug Ghim (born April 16, 1996) is an American professional golfer who grew up in Arlington Heights, Illinois and graduated from Buffalo Grove High School. In May 2018, Ghim became the top-ranked golfer in the World Amateur Golf Ranking.

== Amateur career ==
Ghim competed at the 2016 Arnold Palmer Cup.

Ghim was runner-up at the 2017 U.S. Amateur to earn invitations to the 2018 Masters Tournament and U.S. Open. He also won the 2017 Pacific Coast Amateur. From a team perspective, Ghim competed at the 2017 Arnold Palmer Cup and 2017 Walker Cup.

At the 2018 Masters, Ghim scored multiple eagles to earn an award of two pairs of crystal goblets. As the only amateur to make the cut, he earned low amateur honors. He finished tied for 50th at 296 (+8).

Ghim won the 2018 Ben Hogan Award as the best male college golfer. Prior to the 2018 Travelers Championship, Ghim turned professional.

== Amateur wins ==
- 2010 Junior All-Star At The Rail
- 2011 Illinois State Junior Amateur, Coca-Cola Junior, McArthur Towel & Sports Future Legends
- 2014 CB&I Championship at Carlton Woods
- 2017 UT Longhorn Shootout, Pacific Coast Amateur, Golf Club of Georgia Collegiate, Andeavor Sun Bowl Classic
- 2018 Big 12 Championship, NCAA Raleigh Regional

== Results in major championships ==
Tournament	2018	2019	2020	2021	2022	2023	2024	2025
Masters Tournament	T50LA							
PGA Championship							T35	
U.S. Open	CUT							CUT
The Open Championship								

Did not play

LA = low amateur
CUT = missed the halfway cut
"T" = tied

== Results in The Players Championship ==
Tournament	2021	2022	2023	2024	2025
The Players Championship	T29	T6	CUT	T16	CUT

Top 10

CUT = missed the halfway cut
"T" indicates a tie for a place

== U.S. national team appearances ==
Amateur

- Arnold Palmer Cup: 2016, 2017 (winners)
- Walker Cup: 2017 (winners)

== See also ==
- 2019 Korn Ferry Tour Finals graduates
