= 2018 Masters Tournament =

82nd edition of the Masters Tournament

- Front cover of the 2018 Masters Journal

Tournament information
- Dates: April 5–8, 2018
- Location: Augusta, Georgia, U.S. 33.503°N 82.020°W
- Course: Augusta National Golf Club
- Tours: PGA Tour; European Tour; Japan Golf Tour

Statistics
- Par: 72
- Length: 7,435 yards (6,799 m)
- Field: 87 players, 53 after cut
- Cut: 149 (+5)
- Prize fund: $11,000,000
- Winner's share: $1,980,000

Champion
- (United States) Patrick Reed
- 273 (−15)

Location map
- Location in the United States Location in Georgia

The 2018 Masters Tournament was the 82nd edition of the Masters Tournament and the first of golf's four major championships in 2018. It was held April 5–8 at Augusta National Golf Club in Augusta, Georgia.

Patrick Reed won his first major title with a final round 71 (−1) for 273 (−15), one stroke ahead of runner-up Rickie Fowler.

== Media ==
The 2018 Masters Tournament was the 63rd Masters Tournament to be televised by CBS with early round coverage airing on ESPN using CBS production crews.

== Course ==
| Hole | Name | Yards | Par | Hole | Name | Yards | Par |
|---|---|---|---|---|---|---|---|
| 1 | Tea Olive | 445 | 4 | 10 | Camellia | 495 | 4 |
| 2 | Pink Dogwood | 575 | 5 | 11 | White Dogwood | 505 | 4 |
| 3 | Flowering Peach | 350 | 4 | 12 | Golden Bell | 155 | 3 |
| 4 | Flowering Crab Apple | 240 | 3 | 13 | Azalea | 510 | 5 |
| 5 | Magnolia | 455 | 4 | 14 | Chinese Fir | 440 | 4 |
| 6 | Juniper | 180 | 3 | 15 | Firethorn | 530 | 5 |
| 7 | Pampas | 450 | 4 | 16 | Redbud | 170 | 3 |
| 8 | Yellow Jasmine | 570 | 5 | 17 | Nandina | 440 | 4 |
| 9 | Carolina Cherry | 460 | 4 | 18 | Holly | 465 | 4 |
| Out | | 3,725 | 36 | In | | 3,710 | 36 |
| | | | | Total | | 7,435 | 72 |

== Field ==
The Masters has the smallest field of the four major championships. Officially, the Masters remains an invitation event, but there is a set of qualifying criteria that determines who is included in the field. Each player is classified according to the first category by which he qualified, with other categories in which he qualified shown in parentheses.

Golfers who qualify based solely on their performance in amateur tournaments (categories 6–10) must remain amateurs on the starting day of the tournament to be eligible to play.

1. Past Masters Champions

- Ángel Cabrera
- Fred Couples
- Sergio García (11,16,17,18)
- Trevor Immelman
- Zach Johnson (3,17)
- Bernhard Langer
- Sandy Lyle
- Phil Mickelson (3,15,17,18)
- Larry Mize
- José María Olazábal
- Mark O'Meara
- Charl Schwartzel (11,17)
- Adam Scott (11,17)
- Vijay Singh
- Jordan Spieth (2,3,11,13,15,16,17,18)
- Bubba Watson (15,18)
- Mike Weir
- Danny Willett
- Tiger Woods
- Ian Woosnam
- Past champions who did not play: Tommy Aaron, Jack Burke Jr., Charles Coody, Ben Crenshaw, Nick Faldo, Raymond Floyd, Doug Ford, Bob Goalby, Jack Nicklaus, Gary Player, Craig Stadler, Tom Watson, Fuzzy Zoeller.

2. Last five U.S. Open Champions

- Dustin Johnson (15,16,17,18)
- Martin Kaymer
- Justin Rose (11,15,16,17,18)
- Brooks Koepka (11,12,15,16,17,18) withdrew due to a wrist injury.

3. Last five Open Champions

- Rory McIlroy (4,11,13,15,17,18)
- Henrik Stenson (15,17,18)

4. Last five PGA Champions

- Jason Day (5,15,16,17,18)
- Jason Dufner (15,16,17,18)
- Justin Thomas (14,15,16,17,18)
- Jimmy Walker

5. Last three winners of The Players Championship

- Rickie Fowler (11,16,17,18)
- Kim Si-woo (17,18)

6. Top two finishers in the 2017 U.S. Amateur

- Doug Ghim (a)
- Doc Redman (a)

7. Winner of the 2017 Amateur Championship

- Harry Ellis (a)

8. Winner of the 2017 Asia-Pacific Amateur Championship

- Lin Yuxin (a)

9. Winner of the 2017 U.S. Mid-Amateur

- Matt Parziale (a)

10. Winner of the 2018 Latin America Amateur Championship

- Joaquín Niemann (a)

11. The top 12 finishers and ties in the 2017 Masters Tournament

- Paul Casey (15,16,17,18)
- Kevin Chappell (15,16,17,18)
- Russell Henley (16,17)
- Matt Kuchar (13,16,17,18)
- Hideki Matsuyama (12,15,16,17,18)
- Ryan Moore
- Thomas Pieters (17,18)

12. Top 4 finishers and ties in the 2017 U.S. Open

- Tommy Fleetwood (17,18)
- Brian Harman (15,16,17,18)

13. Top 4 finishers and ties in the 2017 Open Championship

- Rafa Cabrera-Bello (17,18)
- Li Haotong (18)

14. Top 4 finishers and ties in the 2017 PGA Championship

- Francesco Molinari (17,18)
- Louis Oosthuizen (17,18)
- Patrick Reed (16,17,18)

15. Winners of PGA Tour events that award a full-point allocation for the FedEx Cup, between the 2017 Masters Tournament and the 2018 Masters Tournament

- Daniel Berger (16,17,18)
- Wesley Bryan
- Patrick Cantlay (16,17,18)
- Austin Cook
- Bryson DeChambeau
- Billy Horschel
- Kevin Kisner (16,17,18)
- Patton Kizzire
- Marc Leishman (16,17,18)
- Pat Perez (16,17,18)
- Ted Potter Jr.
- Ian Poulter
- Jon Rahm (16,17,18)
- Xander Schauffele (16,17,18)
- Kyle Stanley (16,17,18)
- Brendan Steele (17,18)
- Jhonattan Vegas (16,17)
- Gary Woodland (16,18)

16. All players qualifying for the 2017 edition of The Tour Championship

- Tony Finau (17,18)
- Adam Hadwin (18)
- Charley Hoffman (17,18)
- Webb Simpson (17,18)

17. Top 50 on the final 2017 Official World Golf Ranking list

- Kiradech Aphibarnrat (18)
- Ross Fisher (18)
- Matt Fitzpatrick (18)
- Branden Grace (18)
- Tyrrell Hatton (18)
- Yuta Ikeda
- Yūsaku Miyazato
- Alex Norén (18)
- Bernd Wiesberger

18. Top 50 on the Official World Golf Ranking list on March 26, 2018

- Dylan Frittelli
- Satoshi Kodaira
- Chez Reavie
- Cameron Smith

19. International invitees

- Shubhankar Sharma

== Par 3 Contest ==
Wednesday, April 4, 2018

Tom Watson won the Par 3 Contest with a score of 21 (−6). It was Watson's second win in the contest, having previously won in 1982. Three holes-in-one were recorded, including one by the grandson of Jack Nicklaus.

== Round summaries ==
=== First round ===
Thursday, April 5, 2018

Jordan Spieth, the 2015 champion, birdied five consecutive holes on the back-nine to post a round of 66 (−6) and take the first round lead for the third time in four years. Playing a day after dislocating an ankle during the Par 3 Contest, Tony Finau finished two shots back, along with Matt Kuchar. Four-time champion Tiger Woods, playing the Masters for the first time in three years, was three-over after a bogey on the 12th but rebounded with two birdies to finish with 73 (+1). Defending champion Sergio García hit five consecutive balls onto the green which rolled back into the water on the par-5 15th and carded a one-putt 13, the highest score on that hole in Masters history, and tied for the worst in history on any hole. He birdied the next hole; his 81 (+9) put him in a tie for 85th place.

| Place | Player | Score | To par |
|---|---|---|---|
| 1 | (United States) Jordan Spieth | 66 | −6 |
| T2 | (United States) Tony Finau | 68 | −4 |
| T2 | (United States) Matt Kuchar | 68 | −4 |
| T4 | (Spain) Rafa Cabrera-Bello | 69 | −3 |
| T4 | (Canada) Adam Hadwin | 69 | −3 |
| T4 | (United States) Charley Hoffman | 69 | −3 |
| T4 | (China) Li Haotong | 69 | −3 |
| T4 | (Northern Ireland) Rory McIlroy | 69 | −3 |
| T4 | (United States) Patrick Reed | 69 | −3 |
| T4 | (Sweden) Henrik Stenson | 69 | −3 |

=== Second round ===
Friday, April 6, 2018

Playing in the afternoon, Patrick Reed made nine birdies to go along with three bogies on his way to a 66 (−6). He had three separate streaks of three birdies to take a two shot lead over Marc Leishman. Leishman, playing with Tiger Woods, eagled the par-5 15th to shoot a 67 (−5). Henrik Stenson was four back of Reed after a solid 70 (−2). First-round leader Jordan Spieth fell back with a 74 (+2) to end the day at −4 overall along with Rory McIlroy. Woods, looking for his first win since 2013, made the cut with a 75 (+3). Doug Ghim was the only amateur that made the cut.

| Place | Player | Score | To par |
|---|---|---|---|
| 1 | (United States) Patrick Reed | 69-66=135 | −9 |
| 2 | (Australia) Marc Leishman | 70-67=137 | −7 |
| 3 | (Sweden) Henrik Stenson | 69-70=139 | −5 |
| T4 | (Northern Ireland) Rory McIlroy | 69-71=140 | −4 |
| T4 | (United States) Jordan Spieth | 66-74=140 | −4 |
| T6 | (United States) Dustin Johnson | 73-68=141 | −3 |
| T6 | (United States) Justin Thomas | 74-67=141 | −3 |
| T8 | (United States) Tony Finau | 68-74=142 | −2 |
| T8 | (United States) Rickie Fowler | 70-72=142 | −2 |
| T8 | (United States) Charley Hoffman | 69-73=142 | −2 |
| T8 | (South Africa) Louis Oosthuizen | 71-71=142 | −2 |
| T8 | (England) Justin Rose | 72-70=142 | −2 |
| T8 | (United States) Bubba Watson | 73-69=142 | −2 |

Amateurs: Ghim (+4), Niemann (+9), Redman (+9), Lin (+15), Parziale (+16), Ellis (+22)

=== Third round ===
Saturday, April 7, 2018

Patrick Reed recorded four birdies and two eagles on his way to a round of 67 and a three-shot lead heading to the final round. Reed was even on his round before three straight birdies on holes 8–10. At the par-5 13th, he hit his approach to 14 feet and made the putt for an eagle. Then on the 15th he chipped in from just off the green for another eagle. Rory McIlroy began the round five shots out of the lead but erased the deficit with a score of 31 on the first nine. He made three birdies in a four-hole stretch then chipped in for eagle at the par-5 8th to get into a share of the lead. Falling as much as five shots behind Reed on the second nine, McIlroy rebounded with birdies on the 15th and 18th to post a bogey-free round of 65 and cut Reed's advantage down to three. Rickie Fowler and Jon Rahm both shot bogey-free rounds of 65 (−7) and were five and six shots behind, respectively. It was the first time in Masters history three players shot as low as 65 in the same round. The scoring average was 71.26, the lowest third round average since 1986. Marc Leishman began the day in the final pairing and two shots out of the lead but failed to make a birdie in a one-over round of 73.

| Place | Player | Score | To par |
|---|---|---|---|
| 1 | (United States) Patrick Reed | 69-66-67=202 | −14 |
| 2 | (Northern Ireland) Rory McIlroy | 69-71-65=205 | −11 |
| 3 | (United States) Rickie Fowler | 70-72-65=207 | −9 |
| 4 | (Spain) Jon Rahm | 75-68-65=208 | −8 |
| 5 | (Sweden) Henrik Stenson | 69-70-70=209 | −7 |
| T6 | (England) Tommy Fleetwood | 72-72-66=210 | −6 |
| T6 | (Australia) Marc Leishman | 70-67-73=210 | −6 |
| T6 | (United States) Bubba Watson | 73-69-68=210 | −6 |
| T9 | (United States) Jordan Spieth | 66-74-71=211 | −5 |
| T9 | (United States) Justin Thomas | 74-67-70=211 | −5 |

=== Final round ===
Sunday, April 8, 2018

==== Summary ====
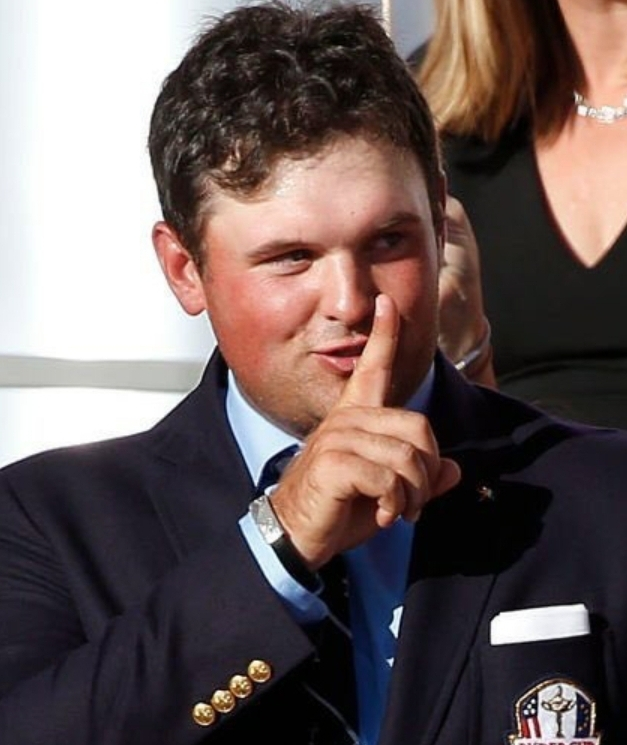
Patrick Reed won his first Masters title

External videos
- Full final round coverage on CBS on YouTube

Patrick Reed's one-under round of 71 was enough to hold off charges from Rickie Fowler and Jordan Spieth for his first major championship. Reed began the day three shots ahead of Rory McIlroy but bogeyed the 1st and failed to make birdie on the par-5 2nd. McIlroy had a four-foot (1.2 m) eagle putt on the same hole that would have tied Reed but missed, settling for birdie to cut the deficit to one. Reed regained his advantage with a birdie on the 3rd hole while McIlroy made bogey. McIlroy made two more bogeys on the first nine, while Reed recovered from a bogey at 7 with a birdie on the 8th to take a four-shot lead to the second nine.

Jordan Spieth began the round nine shots behind Reed but mounted a charge to get back into contention. He birdied his first two holes and added three more birdies on the first nine. At the par-3 12th, where in 2016 he made a quadruple-bogey that cost him the title, he made a 27-foot (8 m) putt for birdie from just off the green. He made another birdie on the 13th after narrowly missing an eagle putt, two-putted for birdie on the par-5 15th, then made a 33-footer for birdie on the 16th to get to nine-under for the round and tie Reed. On the 18th, however, Spieth's drive hit a tree and he was unable to save par, settling for a round of 64 (−8).

At the same time, Rickie Fowler was making a challenge to Reed's lead. He began five shots behind and was one-over on his round thru seven, but made six birdies on his last 11 holes. At the 18th, he holed a 7-footer for birdie to post a round of 67 (−5) and get within one.

Reed, meanwhile, made bogey on the 11th but made a 22-foot (7 m) putt for birdie at the 12th. On the 13th, his approach to the par-5 came up short but hung up in the rough instead of falling into the water, but he was unable to get up-and-down for birdie. At the 14th, he hit his approach to eight feet and made the birdie putt, and was able to save par from over the green on 15. Reed faced an eighty-foot (24 m) putt on the 17th which hit the cup and rolled five feet away, then saved par. With a one-shot lead heading to the last, Reed faced a 25-foot (7.5 m) downhill putt which he hit to four feet. Reed converted to win by one shot over Fowler and two over Spieth. Jon Rahm got to within two of the lead before hitting his approach at 15 into the water and making bogey, finishing alone in fourth place. McIlroy settled for a two-over round of 74 and tied for fifth, six shots behind Reed. Final round scoring average was 70.49, believed to be the lowest single round scoring average in the history of the Masters.

==== Final leaderboard ====
Champion
Silver Cup winner (low amateur)
(a) = amateur
(c) = past champion

Top 10
| Place | Player | Score | To par | Money (US$) |
|---|---|---|---|---|
| 1 | (United States) Patrick Reed | 69-66-67-71=273 | −15 | 1,980,000 |
| 2 | (United States) Rickie Fowler | 70-72-65-67=274 | −14 | 1,188,000 |
| 3 | (United States) Jordan Spieth (c) | 66-74-71-64=275 | −13 | 748,000 |
| 4 | (Spain) Jon Rahm | 75-68-65-69=277 | −11 | 528,000 |
| T5 | (Northern Ireland) Rory McIlroy | 69-71-65-74=279 | −9 | 386,375 |
| T5 | (Australia) Cameron Smith | 71-72-70-66=279 | −9 | 386,375 |
| T5 | (Sweden) Henrik Stenson | 69-70-70-70=279 | −9 | 386,375 |
| T5 | (United States) Bubba Watson (c) | 73-69-68-69=279 | −9 | 386,375 |
| 9 | (Australia) Marc Leishman | 70-67-73-70=280 | −8 | 319,000 |
| T10 | (United States) Tony Finau | 68-74-73-66=281 | −7 | 286,000 |
| T10 | (United States) Dustin Johnson | 73-68-71-69=281 | −7 | 286,000 |

Leaderboard below the top 10
| Place | Player | Score | To par | Money ($) |
|---|---|---|---|---|
| T12 | (United States) Charley Hoffman | 69-73-73-67=282 | −6 | 231,000 |
| T12 | (South Africa) Louis Oosthuizen | 71-71-71-69=282 | −6 | 231,000 |
| T12 | (England) Justin Rose | 72-70-71-69=282 | −6 | 231,000 |
| T15 | (England) Paul Casey | 74-75-69-65=283 | −5 | 192,500 |
| T15 | (United States) Russell Henley | 73-72-71-67=283 | −5 | 192,500 |
| T17 | (England) Tommy Fleetwood | 72-72-66-74=284 | −4 | 170,500 |
| T17 | (United States) Justin Thomas | 74-67-70-73=284 | −4 | 170,500 |
| 19 | (Japan) Hideki Matsuyama | 73-71-72-69=285 | −3 | 154,000 |
| T20 | (Australia) Jason Day | 75-71-69-71=286 | −2 | 128,150 |
| T20 | (Italy) Francesco Molinari | 72-74-70-70=286 | −2 | 128,150 |
| T20 | (United States) Webb Simpson | 76-73-70-67=286 | −2 | 128,150 |
| T20 | (United States) Jimmy Walker | 73-71-71-71=286 | −2 | 128,150 |
| T24 | (South Africa) Branden Grace | 73-73-74-67=287 | −1 | 93,775 |
| T24 | (Canada) Adam Hadwin | 69-75-72-71=287 | −1 | 93,775 |
| T24 | (South Korea) Kim Si-woo | 75-73-68-71=287 | −1 | 93,775 |
| T24 | (Austria) Bernd Wiesberger | 70-73-72-72=287 | −1 | 93,775 |
| T28 | (United States) Kevin Kisner | 72-75-69-72=288 | E | 76,450 |
| T28 | (Japan) Satoshi Kodaira | 71-74-71-72=288 | E | 76,450 |
| T28 | (United States) Matt Kuchar | 68-75-72-73=288 | E | 76,450 |
| T28 | (United States) Ryan Moore | 74-72-72-70=288 | E | 76,450 |
| T32 | (United States) Daniel Berger | 73-74-71-71=289 | +1 | 63,663 |
| T32 | (China) Li Haotong | 69-76-72-72=289 | +1 | 63,663 |
| T32 | (Australia) Adam Scott (c) | 75-73-70-71=289 | +1 | 63,663 |
| T32 | (United States) Tiger Woods (c) | 73-75-72-69=289 | +1 | 63,663 |
| T36 | (United States) Zach Johnson (c) | 70-74-74-72=290 | +2 | 55,275 |
| T36 | (United States) Phil Mickelson (c) | 70-79-74-67=290 | +2 | 55,275 |
| T38 | (Spain) Rafa Cabrera-Bello | 69-76-74-72=291 | +3 | 46,200 |
| T38 | (United States) Fred Couples (c) | 72-74-73-72=291 | +3 | 46,200 |
| T38 | (United States) Bryson DeChambeau | 74-74-72-71=291 | +3 | 46,200 |
| T38 | (England) Matt Fitzpatrick | 75-74-67-75=291 | +3 | 46,200 |
| T38 | (Germany) Bernhard Langer (c) | 74-74-71-72=291 | +3 | 46,200 |
| T38 | (Venezuela) Jhonattan Vegas | 77-69-72-73=291 | +3 | 46,200 |
| T44 | (Thailand) Kiradech Aphibarnrat | 79-70-72-71=292 | +4 | 35,200 |
| T44 | (United States) Brian Harman | 73-74-76-69=292 | +4 | 35,200 |
| T44 | (England) Tyrrell Hatton | 74-75-73-70=292 | +4 | 35,200 |
| T44 | (England) Ian Poulter | 74-75-74-69=292 | +4 | 35,200 |
| 48 | (Germany) Martin Kaymer | 74-73-74-73=294 | +6 | 30,140 |
| 49 | (Fiji) Vijay Singh (c) | 71-74-79-71=295 | +7 | 28,600 |
| T50 | (United States) Doug Ghim (a) | 72-76-74-74=296 | +8 | 0 |
| T50 | (United States) Xander Schauffele | 71-78-72-75=296 | +8 | 27,720 |
| 52 | (United States) Kyle Stanley | 72-74-75-76=297 | +9 | 27,060 |
| 53 | (United States) Chez Reavie | 76-71-75-76=298 | +10 | 26,400 |
| CUT | (United States) Jason Dufner | 73-77=150 | +6 | |
| CUT | (Scotland) Sandy Lyle (c) | 74-76=150 | +6 | |
| CUT | (Spain) José María Olazábal (c) | 74-76=150 | +6 | |
| CUT | (South Africa) Charl Schwartzel (c) | 72-78=150 | +6 | |
| CUT | (United States) Patrick Cantlay | 75-76=151 | +7 | |
| CUT | (South Africa) Dylan Frittelli | 77-74=151 | +7 | |
| CUT | (Belgium) Thomas Pieters | 73-78=151 | +7 | |
| CUT | (United States) Ted Potter Jr. | 73-78=151 | +7 | |
| CUT | (India) Shubhankar Sharma | 77-74=151 | +7 | |
| CUT | (United States) Brendan Steele | 76-75=151 | +7 | |
| CUT | (England) Danny Willett (c) | 75-76=151 | +7 | |
| CUT | (United States) Wesley Bryan | 74-78=152 | +8 | |
| CUT | (England) Ross Fisher | 78-74=152 | +8 | |
| CUT | (United States) Patton Kizzire | 76-76=152 | +8 | |
| CUT | (United States) Pat Perez | 73-79=152 | +8 | |
| CUT | (United States) Kevin Chappell | 77-76=153 | +9 | |
| CUT | (Japan) Yuta Ikeda | 76-77=153 | +9 | |
| CUT | (South Africa) Trevor Immelman (c) | 78-75=153 | +9 | |
| CUT | (Chile) Joaquín Niemann (a) | 76-77=153 | +9 | |
| CUT | (Sweden) Alex Norén | 74-79=153 | +9 | |
| CUT | (United States) Doc Redman (a) | 76-77=153 | +9 | |
| CUT | (United States) Austin Cook | 74-80=154 | +10 | |
| CUT | (Japan) Yūsaku Miyazato | 77-77=154 | +10 | |
| CUT | (United States) Gary Woodland | 78-76=154 | +10 | |
| CUT | (United States) Billy Horschel | 76-79=155 | +11 | |
| CUT | (Canada) Mike Weir (c) | 76-79=155 | +11 | |
| CUT | (Wales) Ian Woosnam (c) | 79-76=155 | +11 | |
| CUT | (United States) Larry Mize (c) | 76-80=156 | +12 | |
| CUT | (Argentina) Ángel Cabrera (c) | 76-83=159 | +15 | |
| CUT | (Spain) Sergio García (c) | 81-78=159 | +15 | |
| CUT | (China) Lin Yuxin (a) | 79-80=159 | +15 | |
| CUT | (United States) Mark O'Meara (c) | 78-81=159 | +15 | |
| CUT | (United States) Matt Parziale (a) | 81-79=160 | +16 | |
| CUT | (England) Harry Ellis (a) | 86-80=166 | +22 | |

==== Scorecard ====
| Hole | 1 | 2 | 3 | 4 | 5 | 6 | 7 | 8 | 9 | 10 | 11 | 12 | 13 | 14 | 15 | 16 | 17 | 18 |
|---|---|---|---|---|---|---|---|---|---|---|---|---|---|---|---|---|---|---|
| Par | 4 | 5 | 4 | 3 | 4 | 3 | 4 | 5 | 4 | 4 | 4 | 3 | 5 | 4 | 5 | 3 | 4 | 4 |
| (United States) Reed | −13 | −13 | −14 | −14 | −14 | −13 | −14 | −14 | −14 | −14 | −13 | −14 | −14 | −15 | −15 | −15 | −15 | −15 |
| (United States) Fowler | −9 | −9 | −9 | −9 | −8 | −8 | −8 | −9 | −10 | −10 | −10 | −11 | −12 | −12 | −13 | −13 | −13 | −14 |
| (United States) Spieth | −6 | −7 | −7 | −7 | −8 | −8 | −8 | −9 | −10 | −10 | −10 | −11 | −12 | −12 | −13 | −14 | −14 | −13 |
| (Spain) Rahm | −8 | −9 | −10 | −9 | −9 | −9 | −10 | −10 | −10 | −10 | −10 | −10 | −11 | −12 | −11 | −11 | −11 | −11 |
| (Northern Ireland) McIlroy | −11 | −12 | −11 | −12 | −11 | −11 | −11 | −10 | −10 | −10 | −9 | −9 | −10 | −9 | −9 | −9 | −9 | −9 |
| (Australia) Smith | −4 | −4 | −4 | −3 | −3 | −3 | −3 | −3 | −3 | −4 | −4 | −5 | −6 | −7 | −8 | −8 | −9 | −9 |
| (Sweden) Stenson | −8 | −8 | −8 | −8 | −8 | −7 | −8 | −8 | −7 | −7 | −7 | −6 | −7 | −7 | −8 | −8 | −8 | −9 |
| (United States) Watson | −6 | −6 | −6 | −5 | −6 | −6 | −6 | −6 | −7 | −6 | −6 | −6 | −8 | −8 | −8 | −9 | −9 | −9 |

Cumulative tournament scores, relative to par

| Eagle | Birdie | Bogey |
