= Cameron Wilson (golfer) =

American professional golfer (born 1992)

Personal information
- Nationality: United States
- Born: November 2, 1992 (age 33) Stamford, Connecticut, U.S.
- Height: 5 ft 11 in (1.80 m)
- Weight: 175 lb (79 kg; 12.5 st)

Career
- Sport: Golf
- College: Stanford University
- Turned professional: 2014
- Former tours: Web.com Tour; PGA Tour Latinoamérica; PGA Tour Canada

Best results in major championships
- Masters Tournament: DNP
- PGA Championship: DNP
- U.S. Open: 64th: 2018
- The Open Championship: DNP

Cameron Wilson (born November 2, 1992) is an American professional golfer who has played on the Web.com Tour, PGA Tour Latinoamérica, and PGA Tour Canada. He qualified for the 2018 U.S. Open and finished in 64th place with a final score of 301 which was 21-over-par.

== Amateur wins ==
this list may be incomplete

- 2009 Metropolitan Amateur
- 2013 Ike Championship
- 2014 NCAA Division I Championship

== Results in major championships ==
Tournament	2012	2013	2014	2015	2016	2017	2018
Masters Tournament							
U.S. Open	CUT		CUT				64
The Open Championship							
PGA Championship							

Did not play

CUT = missed the half-way cut
"T" = tied
