= Dylan Meyer (golfer) =

American professional golfer (born 1995)

Personal information
- Nationality: United States
- Born: July 10, 1995 (age 31)

Career
- Sport: Golf
- College: University of Illinois
- Turned professional: 2018
- Former tours: Korn Ferry Tour; PGA Tour Canada

Best results in major championships
- Masters Tournament: DNP
- PGA Championship: DNP
- U.S. Open: T20: 2018
- The Open Championship: DNP

Dylan Meyer (born July 10, 1995) is an American professional golfer from Evansville, Indiana. He attended the University of Illinois before turning professional in 2018. As an amateur, he won the Western Amateur and is a two-time winner of the 3M Augusta Invitational. He made his professional debut at the 2018 U.S. Open.

== Early life and education ==
Meyer began golfing at the age of 5 and would regularly practice with his father, Darren Meyer. He played baseball, basketball, and golf when he was younger, giving up the former two in favor of golf by the time he was 10. He attended Evansville Central High School before playing golf at the University of Illinois.

== Amateur career ==
At Central High School, Meyer earned medalist honors by going undefeated during his senior year. He finished third in the state finals and also recorded the lowest score for the local Courier & Press Men's City title. While at the University of Illinois, Meyer won the 2016 Western Amateur by beating Sam Horsfield 3&1. He also won the 3M Augusta Invitational in 2017, earning a sponsor exemption to the 2018 Valspar Championship. He played in the Valspar Championship as an amateur, making the cut and finishing at 74th. This was his third professional tournament played as an amateur, previously finished T-63 at the 2017 Lincoln Land Charity Championship on the Web.com Tour and missing the cut at the 2017 John Deere Classic. His final win as an amateur came in 2018 when he defended his title at the 3M Augusta Invitational. Overall, Meyer won six college tournaments.

== Professional career ==
Meyer began his professional career at the 2018 U.S. Open where he made the cut and finished 20th overall. During the 2018–19 season, he played in five events on the PGA Tour, with his best finish tied for 7th at the Sanderson Farms Championship and also played on the Korn Ferry Tour.

== Amateur wins ==
- 2014 OFCC Fighting Illini Invite
- 2016 Western Amateur
- 2017 3M Augusta Invitational, Robert Kepler Invitational, Big Ten Championship, Tavistock Collegiate Invitational
- 2018 3M Augusta Invitational

== Results in major championships ==
Results not in chronological order before 2019 and in 2020.

Tournament	2018	2019	2020	2021
Masters Tournament				
PGA Championship				
U.S. Open	T20			CUT
The Open Championship			NT	

Did not play

CUT = missed the half-way cut
"T" indicates a tie for a place
NT = No tournament due to COVID-19 pandemic
