= Brooks Koepka =

American professional golfer (born 1990)

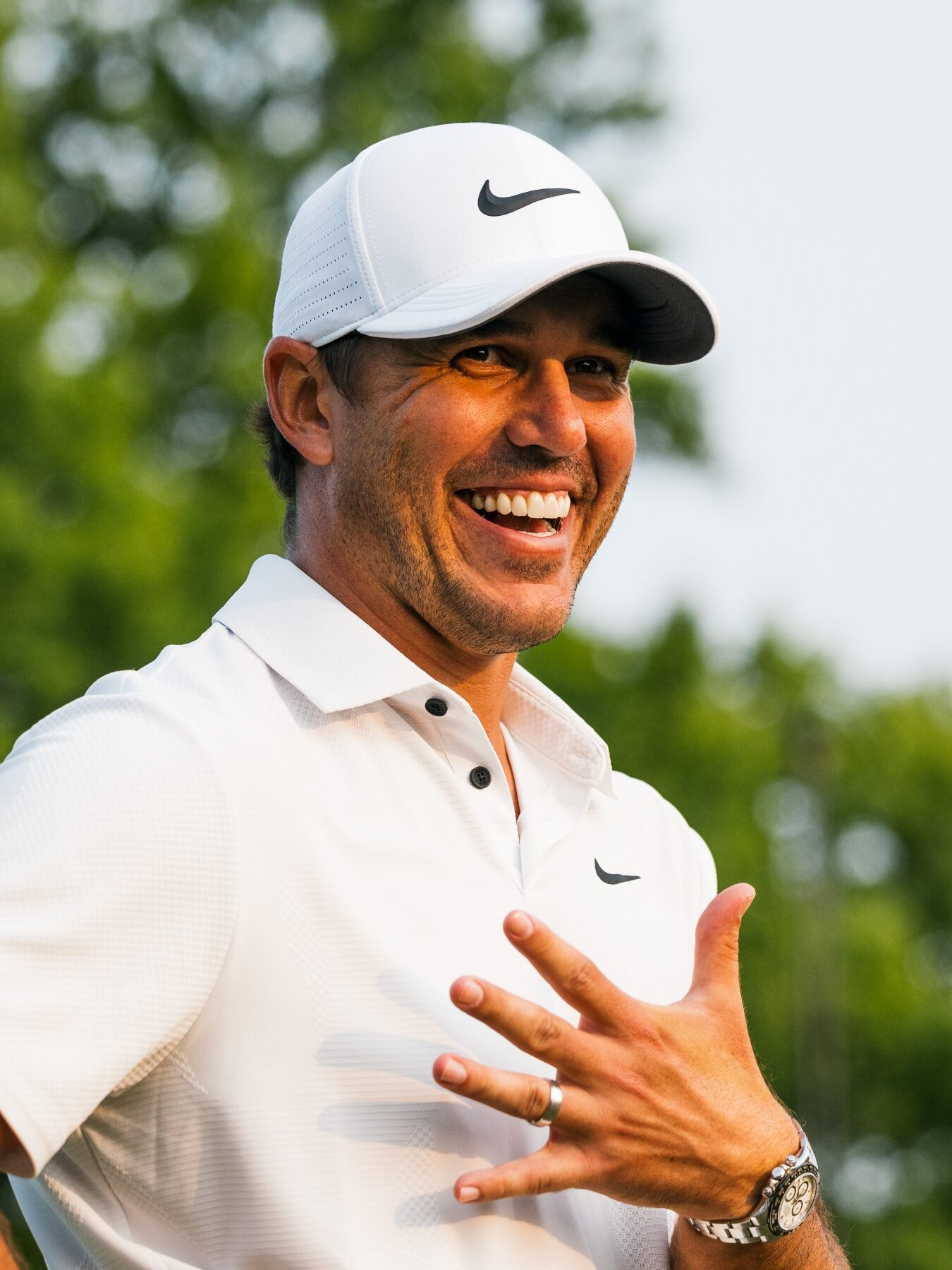
- Koepka in 2023

Personal information
- Nationality: United States
- Born: May 3, 1990 (age 36) West Palm Beach, Florida, U.S.
- Height: 6 ft 0 in (1.83 m)
- Weight: 205 lb (93 kg)
- Spouse: Jena Sims (m. 2022)
- Children: 1

Career
- Sport: Golf
- College: Florida State University
- Turned professional: 2012
- Current tour: PGA Tour
- Former tours: European Tour; Challenge Tour; LIV Golf
- Professional wins: 21
- Highest ranking: 1 (October 21, 2018) (47 weeks)

Number of wins by tour
- PGA Tour: 9
- European Tour: 7
- Japan Golf Tour: 2
- Challenge Tour: 4
- LIV Golf: 5

Best results in major championships (wins: 5)
- Masters Tournament: T2: 2019, 2023
- PGA Championship: Won: 2018, 2019, 2023
- U.S. Open: Won: 2017, 2018
- The Open Championship: T4: 2019

Achievements and awards
- Sir Henry Cotton Rookie of the Year: 2014
- European Tour Graduate of the Year: 2014
- PGA Tour Player of the Year: 2017–18
- PGA Player of the Year: 2018, 2019
- PGA Tour money list winner: 2018–19
- MENA Tour Order of Merit winner: 2022–23

Brooks Koepka (/ˈkɛpkə/ KEP-kə; born May 3, 1990) is an American professional golfer who plays on the PGA Tour. He is a former world number one in the Official World Golf Ranking. Koepka has won five major championships.

After playing collegiately for the Florida State Seminoles, Koepka turned professional in 2012 and achieved a three-win promotion on the Challenge Tour in 2013, which secured status on the European Tour. He won his first European Tour title at the Turkish Airlines Open in 2014 and his first PGA Tour title at the Phoenix Open in 2015.

Koepka won his first major championship at the 2017 U.S. Open, which spearheaded a streak of major victories. He defended his title at the 2018 U.S. Open, and won both the 2018 and 2019 PGA Championship. In 2022, Koepka joined LIV Golf. In the following years, he won multiple LIV Golf events and added his fifth major championship at the 2023 PGA Championship. He left the LIV Golf League and returned to the PGA Tour in 2026.

== Early life and amateur career ==
Born in West Palm Beach, Florida, on May 3, 1990, Koepka was raised in Lake Worth, and attended Cardinal Newman High School in West Palm Beach.

Koepka played college golf at Florida State University in Tallahassee, where he won three events and was a three-time All-American. He qualified for the 2012 U.S. Open as an amateur, but missed the cut by six strokes.

== Professional career ==
=== Early years, European Tour success ===
In the summer of 2012, Koepka turned professional and began playing on the Challenge Tour in Europe. He won his first title in September at the Challenge de Catalunya. In 2013, he had his second victory on the Challenge Tour, winning the 2013 Montecchia Golf Open. He followed this a month later with his third win, the Fred Olsen Challenge de España, where he set the tournament record, 260 (−24), and won by a record 10 strokes.

Three weeks later, he had his third win of the year at the Scottish Hydro Challenge. With those three wins, he earned his European Tour card for the remainder of the 2013 season and for the full 2014 season. The day after his third Challenge Tour win of 2013, Koepka qualified for the 2013 Open Championship. Koepka made his debut as a member of the European Tour (he played in three events prior to promotion to membership) at the Scottish Open, finishing T12.

On the 2014 European Tour, Koepka won the Turkish Airlines Open and finished third at the Dubai Desert Classic and Omega European Masters, and ninth at the Alfred Dunhill Links Championship. He ranked 8th in the 2014 Race to Dubai rankings and was named the European Tour's Sir Henry Cotton Rookie of the Year.

=== PGA Tour ===
On the 2014 PGA Tour, Koepka played a few events on sponsor's exemptions and through open qualifying. In his first event of the year, Koepka led after the second and third rounds of the Frys.com Open. He finished tied for third. At the U.S. Open, he collected a fourth-place finish, which earned him his first PGA Tour card, for the 2014–15 season, and his first Masters invitation. He was 15th at the PGA Championship, and was nominated for the PGA Tour Rookie of the Year award.

On February 1, 2015, Koepka won his first PGA Tour event, the Waste Management Phoenix Open and moved to 19th in the Official World Golf Ranking. At the 2015 Open Championship, Koepka improved every day and a final round 68 vaulted him into a tie for 10th at the Old Course at St Andrews. The next week, Koepka was tied for fourth after 54 holes at the RBC Canadian Open but a final round 74 pushed him down to a tie for 18th at the Glen Abbey Golf Course. He then tied for 6th at the 2015 WGC-Bridgestone Invitational and tied for 5th at the 2015 PGA Championship. In 2015, he chose to give up his European Tour membership.

Koepka finished tied for 4th at the 2016 PGA Championship. In November 2016, Koepka won the Dunlop Phoenix Tournament in Japan.

==== 2017–2019: Major championship streak, rise to world number one ====
In 2017, Koepka won his first major championship by claiming the U.S. Open title at Erin Hills, Wisconsin. His win tied him for the record of the lowest U.S. Open score at 16 under (tied with Rory McIlroy's 2011 record).

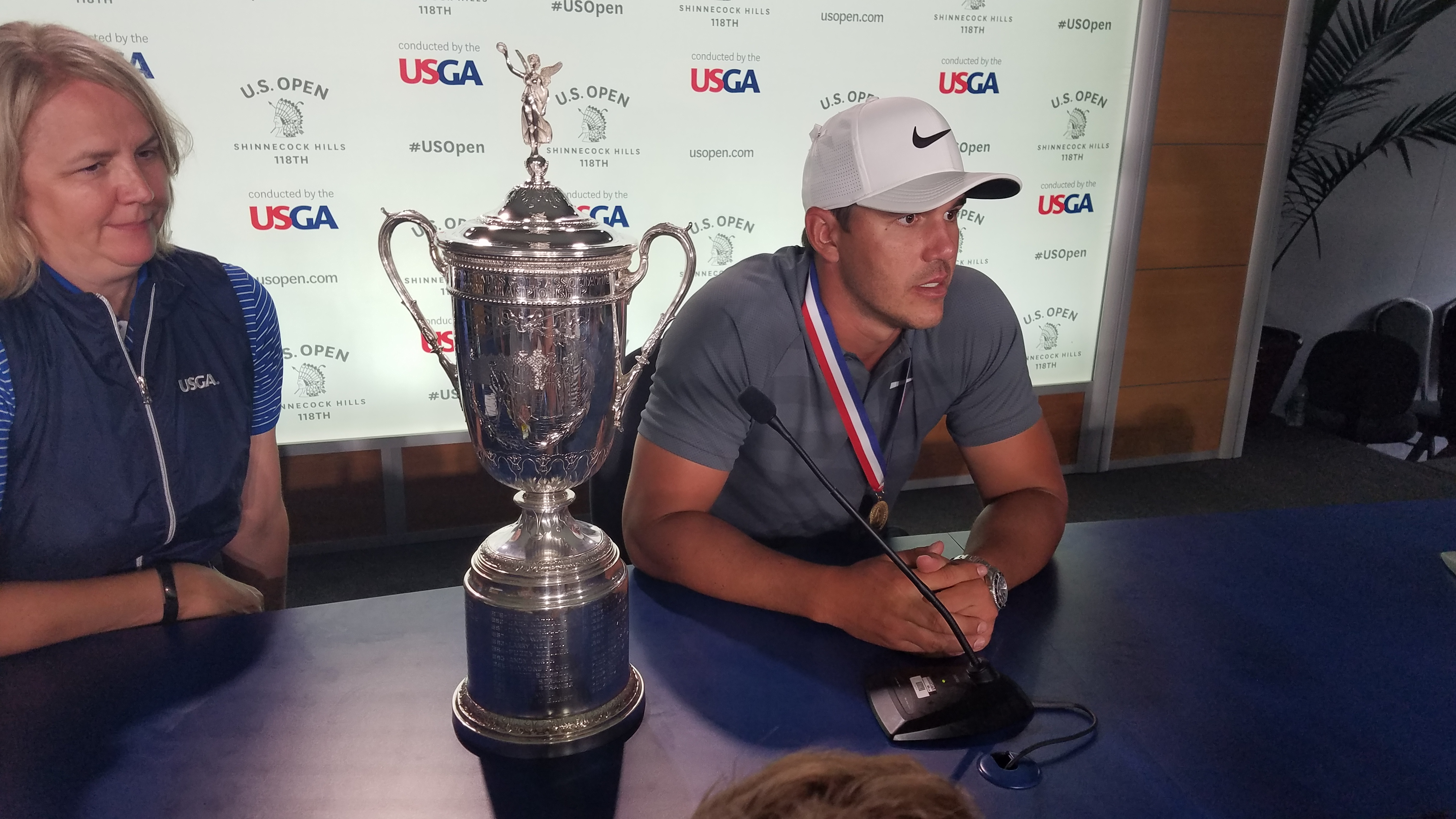
Koepka with the 2018 U.S. Open Trophy at the post-tournament press conference following his win in the event at Shinnecock Hills

Koepka had to undergo wrist surgery after the 2017 season and had hoped that his recuperation would be complete in time for the 2018 Masters Tournament but he had to withdraw, saying that he was only 80% fit. He recovered to successfully defend his U.S. Open title at Shinnecock Hills, becoming the first player since Curtis Strange in 1989 to win consecutive U.S. Open titles, which has occurred only seven times. He won his third major at the 2018 PGA Championship at Bellerive Country Club to become only the fifth player, and the first since Tiger Woods in 2000, to win the U.S. Open and the PGA titles in the same year.

At the 2018 Ryder Cup, an errant tee shot by Koepka struck a female spectator and caused a globe rupture of her right eye resulting in her losing vision in that eye. Also at the Ryder Cup, it was rumored that Koepka and teammate Dustin Johnson got into a feud over some personal issues but Koepka denied these claims saying, "This Dustin thing I don't get, there is no fight, no argument, he's one of my best friends. People like to make a story and run with it. It's not the first time there's been a news story that isn't true that has gone out."

On October 21, 2018, Koepka won the CJ Cup, and the win moved him to number one in the Official World Golf Ranking.

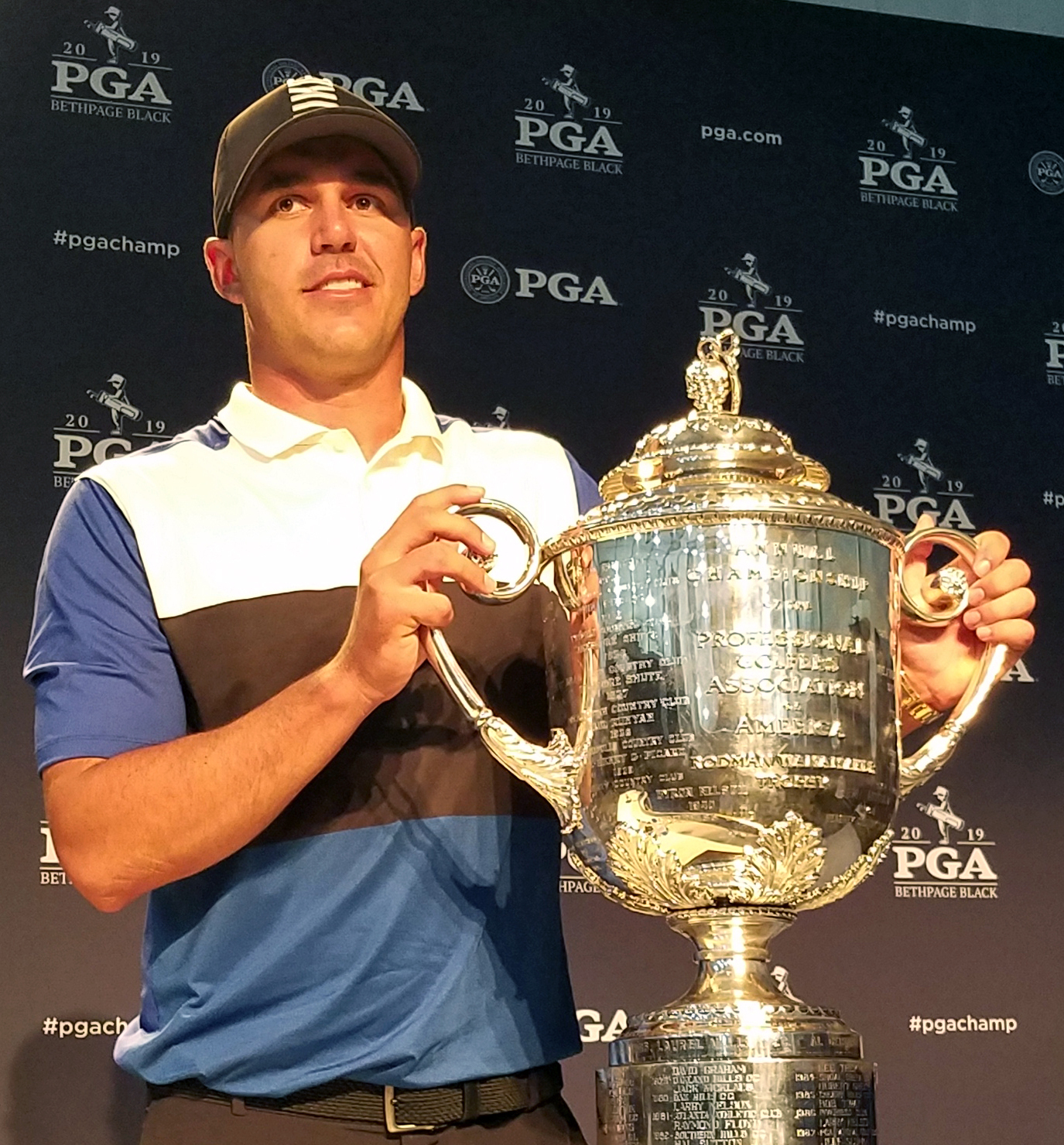
Brooks Koepka poses with the Wanamaker Trophy in the Media Center during his press conference after winning the 2019 PGA Championship at New York's Bethpage Black golf course.

On May 19, 2019, Koepka won the 2019 PGA Championship, the first to successfully defend the PGA Championship since Tiger Woods in 2007. With his win in this major championship, Koepka regained the #1 position in the Official World Golf Ranking.

On July 28, 2019, Koepka won the WGC-FedEx St. Jude Invitational. By doing so, he won $1,745,000 and clinched the season-long Wyndham Rewards Top 10 Challenge and an additional $2,000,000.

On August 4, 2019, Koepka clinched the season-long Aon Risk Reward Challenge and another $1,000,000 for the 2018–19 season. This challenge selects one hole in every participating event and designates it as the Aon Risk Reward hole for that week. The challenge rewards the player who has the best two scores from every participating event that a player competes in throughout the season, measured by the lowest average score to par on these holes.

Koepka won the PGA of America Player of the Year award for the second consecutive year.

Koepka qualified for the 2019 Presidents Cup but withdrew because of a knee injury and was replaced by Rickie Fowler on November 20, 2019. His caddie since 2013 is Ricky Elliott.

==== 2020: Injury problems ====
Koepka was plagued by hip and knee pains for the majority of the season and, in August 2020, withdrew from competition prior to the FedEx Cup playoffs.

In February 2021, Koepka won the Waste Management Phoenix Open at TPC Scottsdale in Arizona. Koepka overcame a five-shot deficit on the final day, with a 6-under-par 65. This was his second win at the event. Koepka underwent knee surgery on March 16, 2021. In May 2021, Koepka finished in a tie for second place at the 2021 PGA Championship. A final round 74 saw him finish two shots behind Phil Mickelson; who became the oldest major champion at the age of 50. In September 2021, Koepka played on the U.S. team in the 2021 Ryder Cup at Whistling Straits in Kohler, Wisconsin. The U.S. team won 19–9 and Koepka went 2–2–0 including a win in his Sunday singles match against Bernd Wiesberger. Koepka won The Match on November 26 against rival Bryson DeChambeau at the Wynn Las Vegas.

=== Move to LIV Golf, fifth major title ===
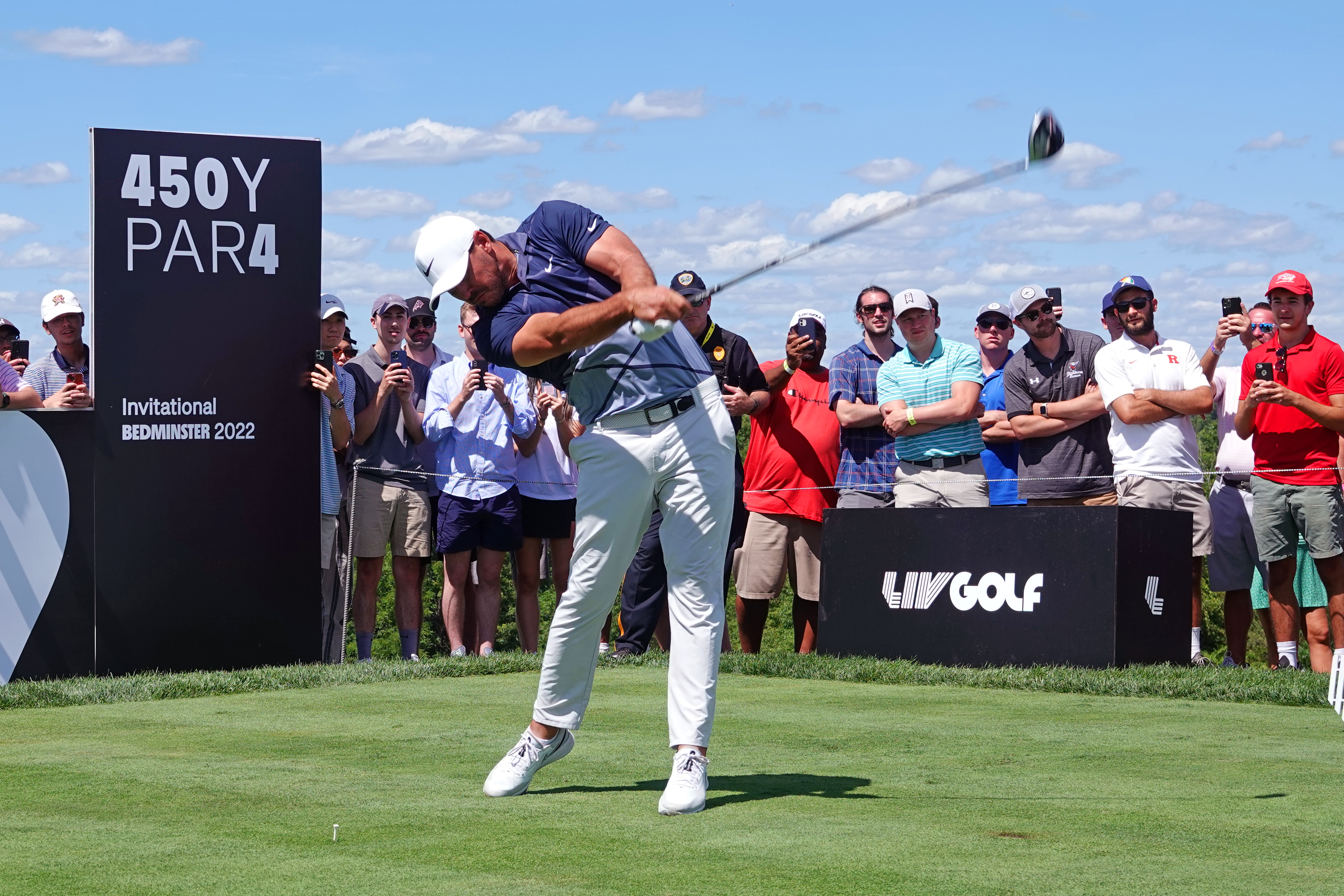
Brooks Koepka tees-off at Trump Bedminster at the LIV Golf Invitational on July 30, 2022.

In June 2022, Koepka joined the LIV Golf Invitational Series and made his debut in Portland. He made his decision despite suggesting four months prior that golfers would "sell out" and join LIV Golf. Koepka was subsequently suspended by the PGA Tour for playing in the LIV Golf Invitational Series. In October 2022, Koepka won the LIV Golf Invitational Jeddah in a playoff over Peter Uihlein for his first LIV Golf win.

In April 2023, Koepka won the LIV Golf Orlando event. The following week, he finished tied for second at the 2023 Masters Tournament, 4 shots behind Jon Rahm. Koepka started the final day of the tournament with a 4 stroke lead and having to play 30 holes after the third round was delayed due to weather. In April, at Augusta National, tournament officials questioned Koepka’s caddie Ricky Elliott regarding whether he broke a rule by giving advice at the par-5 15th, in which Koepka switched to a 5-iron. A video where Elliott seemingly tells Gary Woodland’s caddie "five," as in 5-iron, was shared on social media. Elliott and various members were questioned and said it was not advice-related. The rules committee ultimately absolved Koepka and Elliott of wrongdoing.

In May, Koepka won the 2023 PGA Championship at Oak Hill Country Club, making him the first LIV Golf player to win a major championship. It was Koepka's fifth career major victory and third PGA Championship. He became the 20th golfer with five major victories. Koepka became the third golfer to win three or more PGA Championships in the stroke play era, joining Jack Nicklaus (five wins) and Tiger Woods (four). Koepka has won three major championships within the state of New York, following his 2018 U.S. Open victory at Shinnecock Hills (in Southampton, on Long Island) and 2019 PGA win at Bethpage Black (also on Long Island). "We got three majors in New York, so New York has been a second home to me," he said. The win also made Koepka the first player ever to win majors at three different venues in the same state.

In September 2023, Koepka played on the U.S. team in the 2023 Ryder Cup at Marco Simone Golf and Country Club in Guidonia, Rome, Italy. The European team won 16.5–11.5 and Koepka went 1–1–1 including a win in his Sunday singles match against Ludvig Åberg.

In October 2023, Koepka repeated as the winner of the LIV Golf Jeddah tournament in a playoff over Talor Gooch for his third LIV Golf win.

=== Return to the PGA Tour ===
In December 2025, it was announced that Koepka would be leaving LIV Golf. Talor Gooch took over the captaincy of Smash GC. A statement by LIV Golf said that Koepka was "prioritizing the needs of his family and staying closer to home". Koepka left the LIV Golf League with one year remaining on his contract; LIV Golf CEO Scott O'Neil stated that the league and Koepka had "amicably and mutually agreed" to the departure.

In January 2026, it was announced that Koepka would return to the PGA Tour. As part of his return, he was ineligible to qualify for PGA Tour equity bonuses until 2030 and agreed to make a $5 million charitable donation at the PGA Tour's request. Koepka stated that he would make his PGA Tour return at the Farmers Insurance Open at the end of January, which would be his first start in a regular PGA Tour event since the Valspar Championship in March 2022.

During the 2026 PGA Tour regular season, Koepka recorded one top-10 finish across 15 starts. He placed 94th in the rankings, outside the top-70 cutoff to qualify for the 2026 FedEx Cup Playoffs. Koepka commented: "I think it's pretty pathetic that I can't get through. ... To be in the prime of your career and be as good as I think I am, I think that's very pathetic, disappointing. Just need to go home and completely reevaluate everything."

== Personal life ==
Koepka's younger brother, Chase, is also a professional golfer. The two brothers played as partners in the 2019 Zurich Classic of New Orleans on the PGA Tour, the only Tour event using a team format. His great uncle is Major League Baseball player Dick Groat.

Koepka was previously in a relationship with professional soccer player Becky Edwards. On April 1, 2021, Koepka announced his engagement to actress Jena Sims. They were married on June 4, 2022, in the Turks and Caicos. They have a son, born in 2023.

Koepka appeared in the sports documentary series Full Swing, which premiered on Netflix in February 2023.

== Amateur wins ==
- 2009 Rice Planters Amateur
- 2011 Brickyard Collegiate
- 2012 Seminole Intercollegiate, Florida Atlantic Intercollegiate

== Professional wins (21) ==
=== PGA Tour wins (9) ===
Legend
Major championships (5)
World Golf Championships (1)
Other PGA Tour (3)

No.	Date	Tournament	Winning score	Margin of victory	Runner(s)-up
1	Feb 1, 2015	Waste Management Phoenix Open	−15 (71-68-64-66=269)	1 stroke	(Japan) Hideki Matsuyama, (United States) Ryan Palmer, (United States) Bubba Watson
2	Jun 18, 2017	U.S. Open	−16 (67-70-68-67=272)	4 strokes	(United States) Brian Harman, (Japan) Hideki Matsuyama
3	Jun 17, 2018	U.S. Open (2)	+1 (75-66-72-68=281)	1 stroke	(England) Tommy Fleetwood
4	Aug 12, 2018	PGA Championship	−16 (69-63-66-66=264)	2 strokes	(United States) Tiger Woods
5	Oct 21, 2018	CJ Cup	−21 (71-65-67-64=267)	4 strokes	(United States) Gary Woodland
6	May 19, 2019	PGA Championship (2)	−8 (63-65-70-74=272)	2 strokes	(United States) Dustin Johnson
7	Jul 28, 2019	WGC-FedEx St. Jude Invitational	−16 (68-67-64-65=264)	3 strokes	(United States) Webb Simpson
8	Feb 7, 2021	Waste Management Phoenix Open (2)	−19 (68-66-66-65=265)	1 stroke	(South Korea) Lee Kyoung-hoon, (United States) Xander Schauffele
9	May 21, 2023	PGA Championship (3)	−9 (72-66-66-67=271)	2 strokes	(Norway) Viktor Hovland, (United States) Scottie Scheffler

PGA Tour playoff record (0–1)

No.	Year	Tournament	Opponent	Result
1	2016	AT&T Byron Nelson	(Spain) Sergio García	Lost to par on first extra hole

=== European Tour wins (7) ===
Legend
Major championships (5)
World Golf Championships (1)
Race to Dubai finals series (1)
Other European Tour (0)

No.	Date	Tournament	Winning score	Margin of victory	Runner(s)-up
1	Nov 16, 2014	Turkish Airlines Open	−17 (69-67-70-65=271)	1 stroke	(England) Ian Poulter
2	Jun 18, 2017	U.S. Open	−16 (67-70-68-67=272)	4 strokes	(United States) Brian Harman, (Japan) Hideki Matsuyama
3	Jun 17, 2018	U.S. Open (2)	+1 (75-66-72-68=281)	1 stroke	(England) Tommy Fleetwood
4	Aug 12, 2018	PGA Championship	−16 (69-63-66-66=264)	2 strokes	(United States) Tiger Woods
5	May 19, 2019	PGA Championship (2)	−8 (63-65-70-74=272)	2 strokes	(United States) Dustin Johnson
6	Jul 28, 2019	WGC-FedEx St. Jude Invitational	−16 (68-67-64-65=264)	3 strokes	(United States) Webb Simpson
7	May 21, 2023	PGA Championship (3)	−9 (72-66-66-67=271)	2 strokes	(Norway) Viktor Hovland, (United States) Scottie Scheffler

=== Japan Golf Tour wins (2) ===
No.	Date	Tournament	Winning score	Margin of victory	Runner(s)-up
1	Nov 20, 2016	Dunlop Phoenix Tournament	−21 (65-70-63-65=263)	1 stroke	(Japan) Yuta Ikeda
2	Nov 19, 2017	Dunlop Phoenix Tournament (2)	−20 (65-68-64-67=264)	9 strokes	(South Korea) Lee Sang-hee, (Thailand) Prayad Marksaeng, (United States) Xander Schauffele

=== Challenge Tour wins (4) ===
No.	Date	Tournament	Winning score	Margin of victory	Runner(s)-up
1	Sep 30, 2012	Challenge de Catalunya	−16 (68-67-65=200) (Note: Shortened to 54 holes due to weather.)	3 strokes	(Italy) Alessandro Tadini
2	May 5, 2013	Montecchia Golf Open	−23 (66-67-62-66=261)	7 strokes	(Spain) Agustín Domingo
3	Jun 2, 2013	Fred Olsen Challenge de España	−24 (64-66-64-66=260)	10 strokes	(Spain) Luis Claverie, (France) Édouard Dubois, (Germany) Bernd Ritthammer
4	Jun 23, 2013	Scottish Hydro Challenge	−18 (70-66-62-68=266)	3 strokes	(South Korea) An Byeong-hun, (Italy) Andrea Pavan, (England) Steven Tiley, (England) Sam Walker

=== LIV Golf League wins (5) ===
No.	Date	Tournament	Winning score	Margin of victory	Runner(s)-up
1	Oct 16, 2022	LIV Golf Invitational Jeddah^{1}	−12 (62-67-69=198)	Playoff	(United States) Peter Uihlein
2	Apr 2, 2023	LIV Golf Orlando^{1}	−15 (65-65-68=198)	1 stroke	(Colombia) Sebastián Muñoz
3	Oct 15, 2023	LIV Golf Jeddah^{1} (2)	−14 (66-62-68=196)	Playoff	(United States) Talor Gooch
4	May 5, 2024	LIV Golf Singapore	−15 (66-64-68=198)	2 strokes	(Australia) Marc Leishman, (Australia) Cameron Smith
5	Aug 18, 2024	LIV Golf Greenbrier	−19 (64-64-63=191)	Playoff	(Spain) Jon Rahm

^{1}Co-sanctioned by the MENA Tour

LIV Golf League playoff record (3–0)

No.	Year	Tournament	Opponent	Result
1	2022	LIV Golf Invitational Jeddah	(United States) Peter Uihlein	Won with birdie on third extra hole
2	2023	LIV Golf Jeddah	(United States) Talor Gooch	Won with birdie on second extra hole
3	2024	LIV Golf Greenbrier	(Spain) Jon Rahm	Won with par on first extra hole

== Major championships ==
=== Wins (5) ===
Year	Championship	54 holes	Winning score	Margin	Runner(s)-up
2017	U.S. Open	1 shot deficit	−16 (67-70-68-67=272)	4 strokes	(United States) Brian Harman, (Japan) Hideki Matsuyama
2018	U.S. Open (2)	Tied for lead	+1 (75-66-72-68=281)	1 stroke	(England) Tommy Fleetwood
2018	PGA Championship	2 shot lead	−16 (69-63-66-66=264)	2 strokes	(United States) Tiger Woods
2019	PGA Championship (2)	7 shot lead	−8 (63-65-70-74=272)	2 strokes	(United States) Dustin Johnson
2023	PGA Championship (3)	1 shot lead	−9 (72-66-66-67=271)	2 strokes	(United States) Scottie Scheffler, (Norway) Viktor Hovland

=== Results timeline ===
Results not in chronological order in 2020.

Tournament	2012	2013	2014	2015	2016	2017	2018
Masters Tournament				T33	T21	T11	
U.S. Open	CUT		T4	T18	T13	1	1
The Open Championship		CUT	T67	T10		T6	T39
PGA Championship		T70	T15	T5	T4	T13	1

Tournament	2019	2020	2021	2022	2023	2024	2025	2026
Masters Tournament	T2	T7	CUT	CUT	T2	T45	CUT	T12
PGA Championship	1	T29	T2	T55	1	T26	CUT	T55
U.S. Open	2		T4	55	T17	T26	T12	CUT
The Open Championship	T4	NT	T6	CUT	T64	T43	CUT	T28

Win
Top 10
Did not play

CUT = missed the half-way cut
"T" indicates a tie for a place
NT = no tournament due to COVID-19 pandemic

=== Summary ===
Tournament	Wins	2nd	3rd	Top-5	Top-10	Top-25	Events	Cuts made
Masters Tournament	0	2	0	2	3	6	11	8
PGA Championship	3	1	0	6	6	8	14	13
U.S. Open	2	1	0	5	5	9	13	11
The Open Championship	0	0	0	1	4	4	12	9
Totals	5	4	0	14	18	27	50	41

- Most consecutive cuts made – 24 (2013 PGA – 2020 Masters)
- Longest streak of top-10s – 5 (2018 PGA – 2019 Open)

== Results in The Players Championship ==
Tournament	2015	2016	2017	2018	2019	2020	2021	2022	2023	2024	2025	2026
The Players Championship	CUT	T35	T16	T11	T56	C		CUT				T13

Did not play

CUT = missed the half-way cut
"T" indicates a tie for a place
C = canceled after the first round due to the COVID-19 pandemic

== World Golf Championships ==
=== Wins (1) ===
Year	Championship	54 holes	Winning score	Margin	Runner-up
2019	WGC-FedEx St. Jude Invitational	1 shot deficit	−16 (68-67-64-65=264)	3 strokes	(United States) Webb Simpson

=== Results timeline ===
Tournament	2015	2016	2017	2018	2019	2020	2021	2022
Championship	T17	T23	T48		T27		T2	
Match Play	T17	QF	R16		T56	NT^{1}		QF
Invitational	T6	WD	T17	5	1	T2	T54	
Champions		T40	T2	T16		NT^{1}	NT^{1}	NT^{1}

^{1}Cancelled due to COVID-19 pandemic

Win
Top 10
Did not play

QF, R16, R32, R64 = Round in which player lost in match play
WD = Withdrew
NT = No tournament
"T" = Tied
The Championship and Invitational were discontinued from 2022.

== U.S. national team appearances ==
Professional

- Ryder Cup: 2016 (winners), 2018, 2021 (winners), 2023
- Presidents Cup: 2017 (winners)

== See also ==
- 2013 Challenge Tour graduates
- List of Florida State Seminoles men's golfers
- List of golfers with most Challenge Tour wins
- List of golfers to achieve a three-win promotion from the Challenge Tour
- List of men's major championships winning golfers
- List of World Number One male golfers
