= 2020 Players Championship =

Tournament information
- Dates: March 12–15, 2020
- Location: Ponte Vedra Beach, Florida; 30.198°N 81.394°W
- Courses: TPC Sawgrass, Stadium Course
- Tour: PGA Tour

Statistics
- Par: 72
- Length: 7,189 yards (6,574 m)
- Field: 144 players
- Prize fund: $15 million
- Winner's share: $2.7 million

Champion
- No winner

Location map
- Location in the United States Location in Florida

The 2020 Players Championship was the 47th edition of The Players Championship, scheduled for March 12–15 at TPC Sawgrass in Ponte Vedra Beach, Florida. It was canceled by the PGA Tour prior to the second round in response to the COVID-19 pandemic; the tour had earlier announced that the tournament would proceed behind closed doors for the remaining three days.

Hideki Matsuyama held a two stroke lead after the first round having equaled the course record of 63, nine under par. Defending champion Rory McIlroy was at even par (72), tied for 83rd place. Half of the $15 million purse was split equally among the 144 competing players, at $52,000 each.

The event was not included in the revised schedule announced in early April 2020.

== Venue ==
=== Course layout ===
The 2020 Players Championship
Tee	Rating/Slope	1	2	3	4	5	6	7	8	9	Out	10	11	12	13	14	15	16	17	18	In	Total
Yards	76.4 / 155	423	532	177	384	471	393	451	237	583	3,651	424	558	302	181	481	470	523	137	462	3,538	7,189
Par		4	5	3	4	4	4	4	3	5	36	4	5	4	3	4	4	5	3	4	36	72

== Field ==
The field consists of 144 players meeting the following criteria:

1. Winners of PGA Tour events since last Players

- Patrick Cantlay (2,8,9)
- Paul Casey (2,9)
- Cameron Champ (2)
- Corey Conners (2)
- Tyler Duncan
- Dylan Frittelli (2)
- Lanto Griffin (13)
- Tyrrell Hatton (2,8,9)
- Jim Herman
- Max Homa (2)
- Viktor Hovland
- Im Sung-jae (2,9,13)
- Kang Sung-hoon (2)
- Kevin Kisner (2,7,9)
- Brooks Koepka (2,4,7,9)
- Andrew Landry (2)
- Nate Lashley (2)
- Marc Leishman (2,9)
- Shane Lowry (2,4,9)
- Graeme McDowell (2,9)
- Rory McIlroy (2,5,6,8,9,13)
- Collin Morikawa (2)
- Sebastián Muñoz (2,13)
- Kevin Na (2,9,13)
- Joaquín Niemann (2)
- Ryan Palmer (2)
- J. T. Poston (2)
- Jon Rahm (2,9)
- Chez Reavie (2,9)
- Patrick Reed (2,4,7,9,13)
- Adam Scott (2,9)
- Webb Simpson (2,5,9,13)
- Cameron Smith (2,9)
- Nick Taylor (2)
- Justin Thomas (2,4,6,9,13)
- Brendon Todd (13)
- Matthew Wolff (2)
- Gary Woodland (2,4,9)
- Pan Cheng-tsung (2) and Tiger Woods (2,4,6,9) did not play.

2. Top 125 from previous season's FedEx Cup points list

- An Byeong-hun (9)
- Abraham Ancer (9)
- Kiradech Aphibarnrat
- Ryan Armour
- Aaron Baddeley
- Keegan Bradley
- Scott Brown
- Sam Burns
- Rafa Cabrera-Bello (9)
- Bud Cauley
- Wyndham Clark
- Joel Dahmen
- Jason Day (4,5,9)
- Bryson DeChambeau (8,9)
- Matt Every
- Tony Finau (9)
- Tommy Fleetwood (9)
- Rickie Fowler (5,9)
- Jim Furyk
- Sergio García (4,9)
- Brice Garnett
- Brian Gay
- Lucas Glover
- Talor Gooch
- Branden Grace
- Emiliano Grillo
- Chesson Hadley
- Adam Hadwin
- Brian Harman
- Russell Henley
- Charley Hoffman
- J. B. Holmes
- Billy Horschel (9)
- Charles Howell III
- Mackenzie Hughes
- Dustin Johnson (4,9)
- Matt Jones
- Kim Si-woo (5)
- Patton Kizzire
- Russell Knox
- Jason Kokrak
- Matt Kuchar (9)
- Martin Laird
- Danny Lee
- Lee Kyoung-hoon
- Luke List
- Adam Long
- Peter Malnati
- Hideki Matsuyama (7,9,13)
- Denny McCarthy
- Troy Merritt
- Phil Mickelson (7)
- Keith Mitchell
- Francesco Molinari (4,8,9)
- Ryan Moore
- Louis Oosthuizen (9)
- Carlos Ortiz
- Pat Perez
- Scott Piercy
- Ian Poulter
- Andrew Putnam
- Patrick Rodgers
- Justin Rose (7,9)
- Sam Ryder
- Rory Sabbatini
- Xander Schauffele (6,7,9)
- Adam Schenk
- Roger Sloan
- Brandt Snedeker (9)
- J. J. Spaun
- Jordan Spieth (4)
- Scott Stallings
- Kyle Stanley
- Henrik Stenson (4,9)
- Sepp Straka
- Kevin Streelman
- Chris Stroud
- Brian Stuard
- Vaughn Taylor
- Michael Thompson
- Cameron Tringale
- Kevin Tway
- Harold Varner III
- Jhonattan Vegas
- Nick Watney
- Bubba Watson (7,9)
- Danny Willett (4,9)
- Aaron Wise
- Jonas Blixt and Kelly Kraft did not play.

3. Top 125 (medical)

- Daniel Berger
- Bronson Burgoon

4. Major champions from the past five years

- Zach Johnson
- Jimmy Walker

5. Players Championship winners from the past five years

6. The Tour Championship winners from 2017 and 2018; FedEx Cup champion for 2018–19 season

7. World Golf Championship winners from the past three years

8. Memorial Tournament and Arnold Palmer Invitational winners from the past three years

- Jason Dufner

9. Top 50 from the Official World Golf Ranking

- Christiaan Bezuidenhout
- Matt Fitzpatrick
- Jazz Janewattananond
- Victor Perez
- Erik van Rooyen
- Matt Wallace
- Bernd Wiesberger
- Shugo Imahira and Lee Westwood did not play.

10. Senior Players champion from prior year

- Retief Goosen

11. Korn Ferry Tour points leader from prior season

- Scottie Scheffler (12)

12. Points leader during the Korn Ferry Tour Finals

13. Top 10 current year FedEx Cup points leaders

14. Remaining positions and alternates filled through current year FedEx Cup standings

- Tom Hoge (22nd)
- Harris English (29th)
- Mark Hubbard (30th)
- Brendan Steele (40th)

== Round summaries ==
"As the situation continued to escalate, and there seemed to be more unknowns, it ultimately became a matter of when, not if, we would need to call it a day."

— Jay Monahan, PGA Tour commissioner

=== First round ===
Thursday, March 12, 2020

Hideki Matsuyama tied the course record with a score of 63 (−9). Following the round, the PGA Tour canceled the remainder of the event due to the COVID-19 pandemic.

Place	Player	Score	To par
1	(Japan) Hideki Matsuyama	63	−9
T2	(South Africa) Christiaan Bezuidenhout	65	−7
T2	(United States) Harris English	65	−7
T2	(South Korea) Kim Si-woo	65	−7
T5	(United States) Patrick Cantlay	67	−5
T5	(Australia) Marc Leishman	67	−5
T7	(United States) Daniel Berger	68	−4
T7	(Spain) Rafa Cabrera-Bello	68	−4
T7	(United States) Cameron Champ	68	−4
T7	(Canada) Corey Conners	68	−4
T7	(United States) Jason Dufner	68	−4
T7	(United States) Jim Herman	68	−4
T7	(Norway) Viktor Hovland	68	−4
T7	(United States) Nate Lashley	68	−4
T7	(Northern Ireland) Graeme McDowell	68	−4
T7	(United States) Keith Mitchell	68	−4
T7	(United States) Collin Morikawa	68	−4
T7	(Slovakia) Rory Sabbatini	68	−4
T7	(United States) Scottie Scheffler	68	−4
T7	(United States) Webb Simpson	68	−4
T7	(United States) Michael Thompson	68	−4

- Note: Four players only completed 17 holes, with the lowest scorer on 1 under par when play was cancelled.

Scorecard of Hideki Matsuyama

Hole	10	11	12	13	14	15	16	17	18	1	2	3	4	5	6	7	8	9
Par	4	5	4	3	4	4	5	3	4	4	5	3	4	4	4	4	3	5
(Japan) Matsuyama	−1	−2	−3	−4	−4	−4	−3	−3	−3	−3	−4	−4	−4	−5	−6	−7	−7	−9

Eagle	Birdie	Bogey	Double bogey
