= 2021 WGC-Workday Championship =

Tournament information
- Dates: February 25–28, 2021
- Location: Bradenton, Florida; 27.404°N 82.345°W
- Course: The Concession Golf Club
- Tours: PGA Tour; European Tour

Statistics
- Par: 72
- Length: 7,564 yards (6,917 m)
- Field: 72 players
- Cut: None
- Prize fund: $10,500,000
- Winner's share: $1,820,000

Champion
- (United States) Collin Morikawa
- 270 (−18)
- Location in the United States Location in the Florida

The 2021 WGC-Workday Championship was a golf tournament that was played February 25–28 at The Concession Golf Club in Bradenton, Florida. It was the 22nd and final time the WGC Championship has been played and the first of the World Golf Championships events to be staged in 2021. The event was originally scheduled to take place in Mexico, but due to the COVID-19 pandemic, the event was moved to Florida in January 2021. On February 16, it was announced Workday, Inc. would become the new title sponsor.

Collin Morikawa won the event by three strokes over Billy Horschel, Viktor Hovland, and Brooks Koepka.

== Course layout ==
The Concession Golf Club

Hole	Yards	Par	Hole	Yards	Par
1	428	4	10	410	4
2	476	4	11	211	3
3	605	5	12	349	4
4	237	3	13	545	5
5	478	4	14	222	3
6	183	3	15	424	4
7	606	5	16	442	4
8	402	4	17	610	5
9	450	4	18	486	4
Out	3,865	36	In	3,699	36
Source:		Total		7,564	72

== Field ==
The field consisted of players from the top of the Official World Golf Ranking and the money lists/Orders of Merit from the six main professional golf tours. Each player is classified according to the first category in which he qualified, but other categories are shown in parentheses.

1. The top 50 players from the Official World Golf Ranking, as of February 15, 2021:

- Abraham Ancer (2,3)
- Daniel Berger (2,3)
- Christiaan Bezuidenhout (2,5)
- Jason Day (2)
- Bryson DeChambeau (2,3)
- Harris English (2,3,4)
- Tony Finau (2,3,4,6)
- Matt Fitzpatrick (2,5)
- Tommy Fleetwood (2,5)
- Sergio García (2)
- Tyrrell Hatton (2,3,5,6)
- Billy Horschel (2,3)
- Viktor Hovland (2,3,4)
- Im Sung-jae (2,3,5)
- Dustin Johnson (2,3,4)
- Kevin Kisner (2,3)
- Brooks Koepka (2)
- Jason Kokrak (2)
- Matt Kuchar (2)
- Marc Leishman (2,3)
- Shane Lowry (2)
- Robert MacIntyre (2,6)
- Hideki Matsuyama (2,3)
- Rory McIlroy (2,3,5,6)
- Collin Morikawa (2,3,5)
- Kevin Na (2,3)
- Joaquín Niemann (2,3,4)
- Louis Oosthuizen (2,5)
- Carlos Ortiz (2,4)
- Ryan Palmer (2,3)
- Victor Perez (2,5)
- Jon Rahm (2,3)
- Patrick Reed (2,3,5)
- Justin Rose (2,6)
- Xander Schauffele (2,3,4)
- Scottie Scheffler (2,3)
- Adam Scott (2)
- Webb Simpson (2,3)
- Cameron Smith (2,3)
- Justin Thomas (2,3,4)
- Brendon Todd (2,3)
- Bubba Watson
- Lee Westwood (2,5)
- Bernd Wiesberger (2)
- Matthew Wolff (2,3)
- Gary Woodland (2)
- Will Zalatoris (2)
- Patrick Cantlay (2,4), Paul Casey (2,5,6) and Tiger Woods (2) did not play.

2. The top 50 players from the Official World Golf Ranking, as of February 22, 2021:

- Max Homa (4)

3. The top 30 players from the final 2020 FedExCup Points List:

- Cameron Champ
- Lanto Griffin
- Mackenzie Hughes
- Sebastián Muñoz

4. The top 10 players from the 2021 FedExCup Points List, as of February 22, 2021:

5. The top 20 players from the final 2020 European Tour Race to Dubai:

- Laurie Canter
- Thomas Detry
- Lucas Herbert
- Rasmus Højgaard
- Aaron Rai
- Andy Sullivan
- Sami Välimäki
- Erik van Rooyen

6. The top 10 players from the 2021 European Tour Race to Dubai, as of February 8, 2021:

- Rafa Cabrera-Bello
- David Lipsky
- Jason Scrivener
- Brandon Stone

7. The top 2 players, not otherwise exempt, from the 2020–21 Japan Golf Tour Order of Merit, as of December 31, 2020:

- Yuki Inamori
- Chan Kim

8. The top 2 players, not otherwise exempt, from the 2020–21 PGA Tour of Australasia Order of Merit, as of December 31, 2020:

- Brad Kennedy
- Min Woo Lee

9. The top 2 players, not otherwise exempt, from the final 2019–20 Sunshine Tour Order of Merit:

- J. C. Ritchie
- Daniel van Tonder

10. The top 2 players, not otherwise exempt, from the 2020–21 Asian Tour Order of Merit, as of December 31, 2020:

- Wade Ormsby
- Trevor Simsby

11. The highest ranked available player from Mexico from the Official World Golf Ranking as of February 15, 2021. If the highest ranked available player from Mexico from the Official World Golf Ranking is otherwise eligible, the next highest ranked available player from Mexico within the top 300 on the Official World Golf Ranking as of February 15, 2021

12. The highest ranked players not otherwise qualified from outside the top 50 in the Official World Golf Ranking, as of February 22, 2021, to bring the field up to 72 players:

== Round summaries ==
=== First round ===
Thursday, February 25, 2021

Place	Player	Score	To par
T1	(England) Matt Fitzpatrick	66	−6
T1	(United States) Webb Simpson	66	−6
T3	(Spain) Sergio García	67	−5
T3	(United States) Billy Horschel	67	−5
T3	(United States) Kevin Kisner	67	−5
T3	(United States) Brooks Koepka	67	−5
T7	(United States) Tony Finau	68	−4
T7	(South Korea) Im Sung-jae	68	−4
T7	(Australia) Wade Ormsby	68	−4
T7	(Australia) Cameron Smith	68	−4
T7	(Spain) Jon Rahm	68	−4
T7	(United States) Patrick Reed	68	−4

=== Second round ===
Friday, February 26, 2021

Place	Player	Score	To par
1	(United States) Brooks Koepka	67-66=133	−11
T2	(United States) Billy Horschel	67-67=134	−10
T2	(United States) Collin Morikawa	70-64=134	−10
T2	(Australia) Cameron Smith	68-66=134	−10
T5	(United States) Tony Finau	68-67=135	−9
T5	(England) Matt Fitzpatrick	66-69=135	−9
T5	(United States) Webb Simpson	66-69=135	−9
T8	(United States) Kevin Kisner	67-69=136	−8
T8	(United States) Patrick Reed	68-68=136	−8
T10	(Mexico) Abraham Ancer	71-66=137	−7
T10	(South Africa) Louis Oosthuizen	69-68=137	−7

=== Third round ===
Saturday, February 27, 2021

Place	Player	Score	To par
1	(United States) Collin Morikawa	70-64-67=201	−15
T2	(United States) Billy Horschel	67-67-69=203	−13
T2	(United States) Brooks Koepka	67-66-70=203	−13
4	(United States) Webb Simpson	66-69-69=204	−12
T5	(Northern Ireland) Rory McIlroy	69-70-66=205	−11
T5	(United States) Patrick Reed	68-68-69=205	−11
T7	(England) Matt Fitzpatrick	66-69-71=206	−10
T7	(Norway) Viktor Hovland	71-69-66=206	−10
T7	(Japan) Hideki Matsuyama	72-66-68=206	−10
T7	(United States) Scottie Scheffler	69-70-67=206	−10

=== Final round ===
Sunday, February 28, 2021

==== Final leaderboard ====
Champion
(c) = past champion

Place	Player	Score	To par	Money ($)
1	(United States) Collin Morikawa	70-64-67-69=270	−18	1,820,000
T2	(United States) Billy Horschel	67-67-69-70=273	−15	783,333
T2	(Norway) Viktor Hovland	71-69-66-67=273	−15	783,333
T2	(United States) Brooks Koepka	67-66-70-70=273	−15	783,333
5	(United States) Scottie Scheffler	69-70-67-68=274	−14	430,000
T6	(Northern Ireland) Rory McIlroy	69-70-66-71=276	−12	320,667
T6	(South Africa) Louis Oosthuizen	69-68-70-69=276	−12	320,667
T6	(United States) Webb Simpson	66-69-69-72=276	−12	320,667
T9	(United States) Jason Kokrak	70-69-69-69=277	−11	237,500
T9	(United States) Patrick Reed (c)	68-68-69-72=277	−11	237,500

Leaderboard below the top 10
Place	Player	Score	To par	Money ($)
T11	(England) Matt Fitzpatrick	66-69-71-72=278	−10	189,667
T11	(United States) Kevin Na	73-69-69-67=278	−10	189,667
T11	(Australia) Cameron Smith	68-66-77-67=278	−10	189,667
14	(United States) Tony Finau	68-67-72-72=279	−9	165,000
T15	(Japan) Hideki Matsuyama	72-66-68-74=280	−8	147,333
T15	(Mexico) Carlos Ortiz	73-72-69-66=280	−8	147,333
T15	(United States) Justin Thomas	73-66-70-71=280	−8	147,333
T18	(Mexico) Abraham Ancer	71-66-70-74=281	−7	125,500
T18	(Australia) Jason Day	71-69-69-72=281	−7	125,500
T18	(England) Aaron Rai	72-70-69-70=281	−7	125,500
T18	(United States) Brendon Todd	74-71-67-69=281	−7	125,500
T22	(United States) Bryson DeChambeau	77-64-72-69=282	−6	100,833
T22	(United States) Lanto Griffin	70-72-71-69=282	−6	100,833
T22	(England) Tyrrell Hatton	70-73-70-69=282	−6	100,833
T22	(United States) Max Homa	73-70-67-72=282	−6	100,833
T22	(Colombia) Sebastián Muñoz	69-72-70-71=282	−6	100,833
T22	(United States) Will Zalatoris	72-69-68-73=282	−6	100,833
T28	(Belgium) Thomas Detry	70-73-70-70=283	−5	82,500
T28	(South Korea) Im Sung-jae	68-74-69-72=283	−5	82,500
T28	(Australia) Min Woo Lee	74-71-66-72=283	−5	82,500
T28	(Chile) Joaquín Niemann	69-72-73-69=283	−5	82,500
T32	(South Africa) Christiaan Bezuidenhout	71-72-71-70=284	−4	72,000
T32	(Spain) Sergio García	67-74-67-76=284	−4	72,000
T32	(Spain) Jon Rahm	68-76-72-68=284	−4	72,000
T35	(United States) Daniel Berger	73-71-69-72=285	−3	64,500
T35	(United States) Chan Kim	71-71-72-71=285	−3	64,500
T37	(South Africa) Erik van Rooyen	71-75-72-68=286	−2	59,000
T37	(United States) Trevor Simsby	74-70-70-72=286	−2	59,000
T39	(Australia) Marc Leishman	72-70-74-71=287	−1	55,000
T39	(United States) Xander Schauffele	71-72-73-71=287	−1	55,000
T41	(United States) Kevin Kisner	67-69-80-72=288	E	52,500
T41	(Australia) Jason Scrivener	75-68-70-75=288	E	52,500
43	(United States) Gary Woodland	71-69-71-78=289	+1	51,000
T44	(England) Tommy Fleetwood	75-72-68-75=290	+2	48,500
T44	(Canada) Mackenzie Hughes	73-73-69-75=290	+2	48,500
T44	(United States) Matt Kuchar	73-72-69-76=290	+2	48,500
T44	(South Africa) Brandon Stone	71-74-74-71=290	+2	48,500
T48	(United States) Cameron Champ	72-70-72-77=291	+3	44,500
T48	(Japan) Yuki Inamori	73-68-72-78=291	+3	44,500
T48	(United States) David Lipsky	70-76-74-71=291	+3	44,500
T48	(Republic of Ireland) Shane Lowry	72-70-76-73=291	+3	44,500
T52	(Australia) Wade Ormsby	68-74-78-72=292	+4	41,500
T52	(France) Victor Perez	69-75-75-73=292	+4	41,500
T54	(United States) Dustin Johnson (c)	77-69-69-78=293	+5	38,300
T54	(United States) Ryan Palmer	71-72-78-72=293	+5	38,300
T54	(England) Justin Rose (c)	73-71-76-73=293	+5	38,300
T54	(Australia) Adam Scott (c)	72-72-72-77=293	+5	38,300
T54	(United States) Bubba Watson	77-72-70-74=293	+5	38,300
T59	(Spain) Rafa Cabrera-Bello	74-73-73-75=295	+7	36,250
T59	(Austria) Bernd Wiesberger	76-75-72-72=295	+7	36,250
T61	(Australia) Brad Kennedy	81-73-69-73=296	+8	35,000
T61	(Scotland) Robert MacIntyre	74-72-78-72=296	+8	35,000
T61	(England) Lee Westwood	74-69-77-76=296	+8	35,000
T64	(England) Laurie Canter	72-75-76-74=297	+9	33,875
T64	(Finland) Sami Välimäki	72-76-72-77=297	+9	33,875
66	(United States) Harris English	78-69-71-80=298	+10	33,500
67	(Denmark) Rasmus Højgaard	74-73-71-82=300	+12	33,250
T68	(South Africa) J. C. Ritchie	78-73-72-78=301	+13	32,875
T68	(England) Andy Sullivan	78-77-73-73=301	+13	32,875
70	(Australia) Lucas Herbert	77-77-74-74=302	+14	32,500
71	(South Africa) Daniel van Tonder	76-73-75-79=303	+15	32,250
WD	(United States) Matthew Wolff	83	+11	
