= 2020 FedEx Cup Playoffs =

Tournament information
- Dates: August 20 – September 7, 2020
- Location: TPC Boston; Olympia Fields Country Club; East Lake Golf Club
- Tour: PGA Tour

Statistics
- Field: 125 for The Northern Trust; 70 for BMW Championship; 30 for Tour Championship
- Prize fund: $60 million (bonus money)
- Winner's share: $15 million (bonus money)

Champion
- (United States) Dustin Johnson
- −21

The 2020 FedEx Cup Playoffs, the series of three golf tournaments that determined the season champion on the U.S.-based PGA Tour, was played from August 20 to September 7. It included the following three events:

- The Northern Trust – TPC Boston, Norton, Massachusetts
- BMW Championship – Olympia Fields Country Club, Olympia Fields, Illinois
- Tour Championship – East Lake Golf Club, Atlanta, Georgia

This was the 14th FedEx Cup playoffs since their inception in 2007.

The point distributions can be seen here.

== Regular season rankings ==
Place	Player	Points	Events	Wyndham Rewards Top 10 bonus ($)
1	(United States) Justin Thomas	2,458	15	2,000,000
2	(United States) Collin Morikawa	1,902	18	1,500,000
3	(United States) Webb Simpson	1,878	12	1,200,000
4	(United States) Bryson DeChambeau	1,657	14	1,100,000
5	(South Korea) Im Sung-jae	1,633	23	1,000,000
6	(United States) Patrick Reed	1,426	17	850,000
7	(United States) Daniel Berger	1,347	14	700,000
8	(Northern Ireland) Rory McIlroy	1,327	12	600,000
9	(United States) Brendon Todd	1,316	22	550,000
10	(Spain) Jon Rahm	1,295	12	500,000

== The Northern Trust ==
The Northern Trust was played August 20–23. Of the 125 players eligible to play in the event, two did not play: Vaughn Taylor (ranked 75th) withdrew with a rib injury and Brooks Koepka (ranked 97th) withdrew with knee and hip injuries, reducing the field to 123. Scottie Scheffler scored 59 for his second round, becoming the 11th player to score under 60 in a PGA Tour event. Dustin Johnson led after two rounds after a second round 60, two ahead of Scheffler and Cameron Davis. 70 players made the second-round cut at 139 (−3).

Dustin Johnson won by 11 strokes over Harris English after further rounds of 64 and 63. The top 70 players in the points standings advanced to the BMW Championship. This included six players who were outside the top 70 prior to The Northern Trust: Alex Norén (ranked 78th to 47th), Harry Higgs (72 to 48), Russell Henley (101 to 61), Robby Shelton (81 to 62), Jason Kokrak (90 to 66), and Louis Oosthuizen (99 to 70). Six players started the tournament within the top 70 but ended the tournament outside the top 70, ending their playoff chances: Doc Redman (ranked 60th to 71st), Kang Sung-hoon (61 to 72), Denny McCarthy (65 to 73), Phil Mickelson (67 to 75), Henrik Norlander (68 to 76), and Zhang Xinjun (70 to 78).

					FedEx Cup rank	
Place	Player	Score	To par	Winnings ($)	After	Before
1	(United States) Dustin Johnson	67-60-64-63=254	−30	1,710,000	1	15
2	(United States) Harris English	64-66-66-69=265	−19	1,035,500	6	27
3	(United States) Daniel Berger	66-66-67-67=266	−18	655,500	4	7
T4	(United States) Kevin Kisner	65-66-70-66=267	−17	427,500	23	40
T4	(United States) Scottie Scheffler	70-59-67-71=267	−17	427,500	14	24
T6	(Spain) Jon Rahm	69-67-67-65=268	−16	332,500	9	10
T6	(United States) Webb Simpson	70-64-68-66=268	−16	332,500	3	3
T8	(United States) Russell Henley	64-67-70-68=269	−15	277,875	61	101
T8	(Sweden) Alex Norén	69-68-64-68=269	−15	277,875	47	78
T8	(United States) Ryan Palmer	67-67-68-67=269	−15	277,875	22	29

- Par 71 course

== BMW Championship ==
The BMW Championship was played August 27–30. Of the 70 players eligible to play in the event, one did not play: Webb Simpson (ranked 3rd) withdrew to rest, reducing the field to 69. He was already guaranteed a place in the Tour Championship. There was no second-round cut.

Jon Rahm beat Dustin Johnson with a birdie at the first playoff hole after the two had tied at 276, 4-under-par. The top 30 players in the points standings advanced to the Tour Championship. This included two players who were outside the top 30 prior to the BMW Championship: Joaquín Niemann (ranked 31st to 18th) and Mackenzie Hughes (36 to 28). Two players started the tournament within the top 30 but ended the tournament outside the top 30, ending their playoff chances: Adam Long (27 to 31) and Kevin Streelman (28 to 32).

					FedEx Cup rank	
Place	Player	Score	To par	Winnings ($)	After	Before
1	(Spain) Jon Rahm	75-71-66-64=276	−4	1,710,000	2	9
2	(United States) Dustin Johnson	71-69-69-67=276	−4	1,026,000	1	1
T3	(Japan) Hideki Matsuyama	67-73-69-69=278	−2	551,000	10	18
T3	(Chile) Joaquín Niemann	72-71-68-67=278	−2	551,000	18	31
5	(United States) Tony Finau	70-71-73-65=279	−1	384,750	20	29
T6	(England) Matt Fitzpatrick	70-75-68-67=280	E	337,250	36	60
T6	(United States) Jason Kokrak	74-71-69-66=280	E	337,250	42	66
T8	(Colombia) Sebastián Muñoz	70-75-67-69=281	+1	285,000	15	16
T8	(United States) Brendon Todd	73-68-71-69=281	+1	285,000	11	13
T10	(United States) Lanto Griffin	70-73-70-69=282	+2	247,000	16	15
T10	(Canada) Mackenzie Hughes	69-73-69-71=282	+2	247,000	28	36

- Par 70 course

== Points after BMW Championship ==
Place	Player	Points	Events
1	(United States) Dustin Johnson	3,471	13
2	(Spain) Jon Rahm	3,080	14
3	(United States) Justin Thomas	2,570	17
4	(United States) Webb Simpson	2,163	13
5	(United States) Collin Morikawa	2,025	20
6	(United States) Daniel Berger	2,007	16
7	(United States) Harris English	1,805	19
8	(United States) Bryson DeChambeau	1,682	16
9	(South Korea) Im Sung-jae	1,650	25
10	(Japan) Hideki Matsuyama	1,587	19

== Tour Championship ==
The Tour Championship was played September 4–7 and was contested by the leading 30 players in the FedEx Cup points standings after the BMW Championship, with no second-round cut. Players were allocated a starting score relative to par based on their position in the standings after the BMW Championship. The points leader started the tournament at 10 under par, number two at 8 under par, number three at 7 under par, number four at 6 under par and number five at 5 under par. Players ranked 6 to 10 started at 4 under par, 11 to 15 at 3 under par, 16 to 20 at 2 under par, 21 to 25 at 1 under par and 26 to 30 started at even par. The winner of the Tour Championship wins the FedEx Cup. For the purposes of the Official World Golf Ranking, points are awarded based on aggregate scores (total strokes taken, ignoring any starting scores).

Dustin Johnson won by three strokes from Xander Schauffele and Justin Thomas. Schauffele, who had started 7 strokes behind Johnson, had the best 72-hole aggregate score of 265, three better than Scottie Scheffler and four better than Johnson and Thomas.

Place	Player	Round scores	Starting score	Final score	FedEx Cup rank		Winnings ($)
Place	Player	Round scores	Starting score	Final score	After	Before	Winnings ($)
1	(United States) Dustin Johnson	67-70-64-68=269	−10	−21	1	1	15,000,000
T2	(United States) Xander Schauffele	67-65-67-66=265	−3	−18	T2	14	4,500,000
T2	(United States) Justin Thomas	66-71-66-66=269	−7	−18	T2	3	4,500,000
4	(Spain) Jon Rahm	65-74-66-66=271	−8	−17	4	2	3,000,000
5	(United States) Scottie Scheffler	71-66-66-65=268	−2	−14	5	17	2,500,000
6	(United States) Collin Morikawa	71-65-67-69=272	−5	−13	6	5	1,900,000
7	(England) Tyrrell Hatton	67-66-71-66=270	−2	−12	7	19	1,300,000
T8	(Northern Ireland) Rory McIlroy	64-71-70-67=272	−3	−11	T8	12	960,000
T8	(Colombia) Sebastián Muñoz	71-65-70-66=272	−3	−11	T8	15	960,000
T8	(United States) Patrick Reed	71-66-70-65=272	−3	−11	T8	13	960,000

- Par 70 course

For the full list see here.

== Table of qualified players ==
Table key:

Win
Top-10 finish
Did not advance to next tournament
Played way into next tournament

	Player	Pre-Playoffs		The Northern Trust		BMW Championship		Tour Championship		
	Player	Points	Rank	Finish	Rank after	Finish	Rank after	Starting score	Final score	Final rank
(United States)	Justin Thomas	2,458	1	T49	2	T25	3	−7	−18	T2
(United States)	Collin Morikawa	1,902	2	CUT	5	T20	5	−5	−13	6
(United States)	Webb Simpson	1,878	3	T6	3	DNP	4	−6	−9	T12
(United States)	Bryson DeChambeau	1,657	4	CUT	7	50	8	−4	−3	22
(South Korea)	Im Sung-jae	1,633	5	CUT	8	T56	9	−4	−10	11
(United States)	Patrick Reed	1,426	6	T49	10	T40	13	−3	−11	T8
(United States)	Daniel Berger	1,347	7	3	4	T25	6	−4	−7	T15
(Northern Ireland)	Rory McIlroy	1,327	8	T65	12	T12	12	−3	−11	T8
(United States)	Brendon Todd	1,316	9	64	13	T8	11	−3	−4	T20
(Spain)	Jon Rahm	1,295	10	T6	9	1	2	−8	−17	4
(United States)	Xander Schauffele	1,258	11	T25	11	T25	14	−3	−18	T2
(United States)	Lanto Griffin*	1,159	12	T58	15	T10	16	−2	−5	T18
(Mexico)	Abraham Ancer	1,099	13	CUT	19	T33	22	−1	−5	T18
(Australia)	Marc Leishman	1,086	14	CUT	20	69	25	−1	+2	29
(United States)	Dustin Johnson	1,071	15	1	1	2	1	−10	−21	1
(Colombia)	Sebastián Muñoz	1,045	16	T18	16	T8	15	−3	−11	T8
(United States)	Kevin Na	1,036	17	T39	21	T51	24	−1	+1	T27
(Japan)	Hideki Matsuyama	1,030	18	T29	18	T3	10	−4	−7	T15
(England)	Tyrrell Hatton	1,025	19	T25	17	T16	19	−2	−12	7
(United States)	Cameron Champ	951	20	CUT	25	T65	29	E	E	T24
(United States)	Adam Long	912	21	T49	27	T56	31	–	–	31
(United States)	Kevin Streelman	909	22	T61	28	T51	32	–	–	32
(United States)	Tony Finau	907	23	CUT	29	5	20	−2	−6	17
(United States)	Scottie Scheffler*	900	24	T4	14	T20	17	−2	−14	5
(United States)	Billy Horschel	893	25	CUT	30	T33	30	E	+4	30
(Chile)	Joaquín Niemann	878	26	CUT	31	T3	18	−2	+1	T27
(United States)	Harris English	867	27	2	6	T40	7	−4	−9	T12
(Norway)	Viktor Hovland*	842	28	T18	24	T40	27	E	−4	T20
(United States)	Ryan Palmer	838	29	T8	22	T40	23	−1	E	T24
(Australia)	Cameron Smith	807	30	T18	26	T20	26	E	E	T24
(South Korea)	An Byeong-hun	765	31	CUT	35	T12	33	–	–	33
(United States)	Patrick Cantlay	745	32	CUT	37	T12	34	–	–	34
(United States)	Gary Woodland	741	33	CUT	39	T33	43	–	–	43
(United States)	Matthew Wolff	739	34	T44	33	T16	35	–	–	35
(United States)	Tyler Duncan	736	35	T29	32	T48	40	–	–	40
(Australia)	Adam Scott	726	36	T58	38	T25	41	–	–	41
(Canada)	Nick Taylor	720	37	CUT	40	T51	48	–	–	48
(United States)	Joel Dahmen	720	38	CUT	41	T20	38	–	–	38
(United States)	Tom Hoge	716	39	CUT	43	T65	50	–	–	50
(United States)	Kevin Kisner	710	40	T4	23	T25	21	−1	−1	23
(United States)	Richy Werenski	703	41	68	44	T20	39	–	–	39
(United States)	Mark Hubbard	701	42	T29	34	T51	44	–	–	44
(United States)	Brendan Steele	669	43	T44	45	T33	47	–	–	47
(Canada)	Adam Hadwin	654	44	CUT	49	T40	54	–	–	54
(Australia)	Jason Day	653	45	CUT	50	64	57	–	–	57
(United States)	Michael Thompson	647	46	CUT	51	T59	59	–	–	59
(Mexico)	Carlos Ortiz	630	47	CUT	56	T25	51	–	–	51
(United States)	Andrew Landry	626	48	67	53	68	61	–	–	61
(United States)	Tiger Woods	604	49	T58	57	T51	63	–	–	63
(South Africa)	Dylan Frittelli	604	50	CUT	59	T33	58	–	–	58
(England)	Matt Fitzpatrick*	602	51	CUT	60	T6	36	–	–	36
(Canada)	Mackenzie Hughes	597	52	T13	36	T10	28	E	−8	14
(New Zealand)	Danny Lee	588	53	T18	42	T33	45	–	–	45
(United States)	Jim Herman	581	54	CUT	63	T40	64	–	–	64
(England)	Paul Casey	559	55	T49	64	T16	49	–	–	49
(Canada)	Corey Conners	535	56	T25	54	T33	53	–	–	53
(United States)	Max Homa	526	57	CUT	68	T59	70	–	–	70
(United States)	Maverick McNealy*	523	58	T61	67	T40	68	–	–	68
(United States)	J. T. Poston	516	59	T39	65	T59	67	–	–	67
(United States)	Doc Redman*	514	60	CUT	71	–	–	–	–	71
(South Korea)	Kang Sung-hoon	512	61	CUT	72	–	–	–	–	72
(United States)	Talor Gooch	508	62	T18	52	T65	60	–	–	60
(United States)	Matt Kuchar	502	63	T18	55	T59	62	–	–	62
(United States)	Charles Howell III	492	64	T44	69	T48	69	–	–	69
(United States)	Denny McCarthy	489	65	T49	73	–	–	–	–	73
(United States)	Bubba Watson	489	66	T18	58	T16	46	–	–	46
(United States)	Phil Mickelson	488	67	CUT	75	–	–	–	–	75
(Sweden)	Henrik Norlander*	483	68	CUT	76	–	–	–	–	76
(United States)	Brian Harman	480	69	T11	46	T12	37	–	–	37
(China)	Zhang Xinjun*	474	70	CUT	78	–	–	–	–	78
(Austria)	Sepp Straka	466	71	CUT	79	–	–	–	–	79
(United States)	Harry Higgs*	465	72	T11	48	T56	55	–	–	55
(United States)	Harold Varner III	457	73	CUT	80	–	–	–	–	80
(United States)	Bud Cauley	443	74	CUT	83	–	–	–	–	83
(United States)	Vaughn Taylor	442	75	DNP	85	–	–	–	–	85
(United States)	Brian Stuard	438	76	CUT	87	–	–	–	–	87
(United States)	Patrick Rodgers	431	77	70	86	–	–	–	–	86
(Sweden)	Alex Norén	428	78	T8	47	T40	52	–	–	52
(United States)	Pat Perez	421	79	WD	90	–	–	–	–	90
(United States)	Troy Merritt	419	80	T29	74	–	–	–	–	74
(United States)	Robby Shelton*	417	81	T13	62	T59	66	–	–	66
(South Korea)	Kim Si-woo	409	82	T39	81	–	–	–	–	81
(United States)	Chez Reavie	408	83	T49	89	–	–	–	–	89
(United States)	Nate Lashley	395	84	CUT	96	–	–	–	–	96
(England)	Ian Poulter	392	85	T39	88	–	–	–	–	88
(Australia)	Matt Jones	388	86	69	95	–	–	–	–	95
(United States)	Cameron Tringale	381	87	T29	82	–	–	–	–	82
(United States)	Rickie Fowler	381	88	T49	94	–	–	–	–	94
(England)	Tommy Fleetwood	380	89	T44	92	–	–	–	–	92
(United States)	Jason Kokrak	376	90	T13	66	T6	42	–	–	42
(Australia)	Cameron Davis*	374	91	T29	84	–	–	–	–	84
(Argentina)	Emiliano Grillo	373	92	T44	93	–	–	–	–	93
(United States)	Matthew NeSmith*	372	93	CUT	100	–	–	–	–	100
(United States)	Scott Harrington*	370	94	T65	98	–	–	–	–	98
(United States)	Ryan Armour	366	95	CUT	101	–	–	–	–	101
(United States)	Ryan Moore	360	96	WD	103	–	–	–	–	103
(United States)	Brooks Koepka	360	97	DNP	104	–	–	–	–	104
(United States)	Brandt Snedeker	358	98	CUT	106	–	–	–	–	106
(South Africa)	Louis Oosthuizen	354	99	T13	70	T25	65	–	–	65
(United States)	Jordan Spieth	354	100	CUT	107	–	–	–	–	107
(United States)	Russell Henley	352	101	T8	61	T25	56	–	–	56
(United States)	Sam Ryder	349	102	CUT	108	–	–	–	–	108
(United States)	Sam Burns	345	103	CUT	111	–	–	–	–	111
(United States)	Zach Johnson	337	104	T49	105	–	–	–	–	105
(United States)	Keith Mitchell	328	105	T61	112	–	–	–	–	112
(United States)	Zac Blair	324	106	CUT	113	–	–	–	–	113
(United States)	Scott Brown	323	107	CUT	114	–	–	–	–	114
(United States)	Brian Gay	323	108	CUT	115	–	–	–	–	115
(England)	Justin Rose	313	109	T25	91	–	–	–	–	91
(South Korea)	Lee Kyoung-hoon	312	110	T29	97	–	–	–	–	97
(United States)	Charley Hoffman	311	111	T13	77	–	–	–	–	77
(United States)	Keegan Bradley	309	112	T29	99	–	–	–	–	99
(Northern Ireland)	Graeme McDowell	305	113	CUT	117	–	–	–	–	117
(United States)	Adam Schenk	304	114	T39	109	–	–	–	–	109
(United States)	Lucas Glover	303	115	CUT	118	–	–	–	–	118
(United States)	Luke List	297	116	CUT	119	–	–	–	–	119
(United States)	Scott Stallings	296	117	CUT	120	–	–	–	–	120
(United States)	Brice Garnett	294	118	CUT	121	–	–	–	–	121
(United States)	Scott Piercy	291	119	T29	102	–	–	–	–	102
(Slovakia)	Rory Sabbatini	291	120	CUT	122	–	–	–	–	122
(United States)	Beau Hossler	286	121	T49	116	–	–	–	–	116
(Republic of Ireland)	Shane Lowry	283	122	CUT	123	–	–	–	–	123
(England)	Tom Lewis*	281	123	CUT	124	–	–	–	–	124
(United States)	Bo Hoag*	281	124	CUT	125	–	–	–	–	125
(United States)	Wyndham Clark	276	125	T29	110	–	–	–	–	110

* First-time Playoffs qualifier
