= Workday Charity Open =

Golf tournament formerly on the PGA Tour

Coordinates: 40.1404°N 83.1414°W

Tournament information
- Location: Dublin, Ohio
- Established: 2020
- Course: Muirfield Village Golf Club
- Par: 72
- Length: 7,392 yards (6,759 m)
- Tour: PGA Tour
- Format: Stroke play
- Prize fund: US$6,200,000
- Month played: July
- Final year: 2020

Tournament record score
- Aggregate: 269 Collin Morikawa (2020); 269 Justin Thomas (2020)
- To par: −19 as above

Final champion
- (United States) Collin Morikawa

Location map
- Location in the United States Location in Ohio

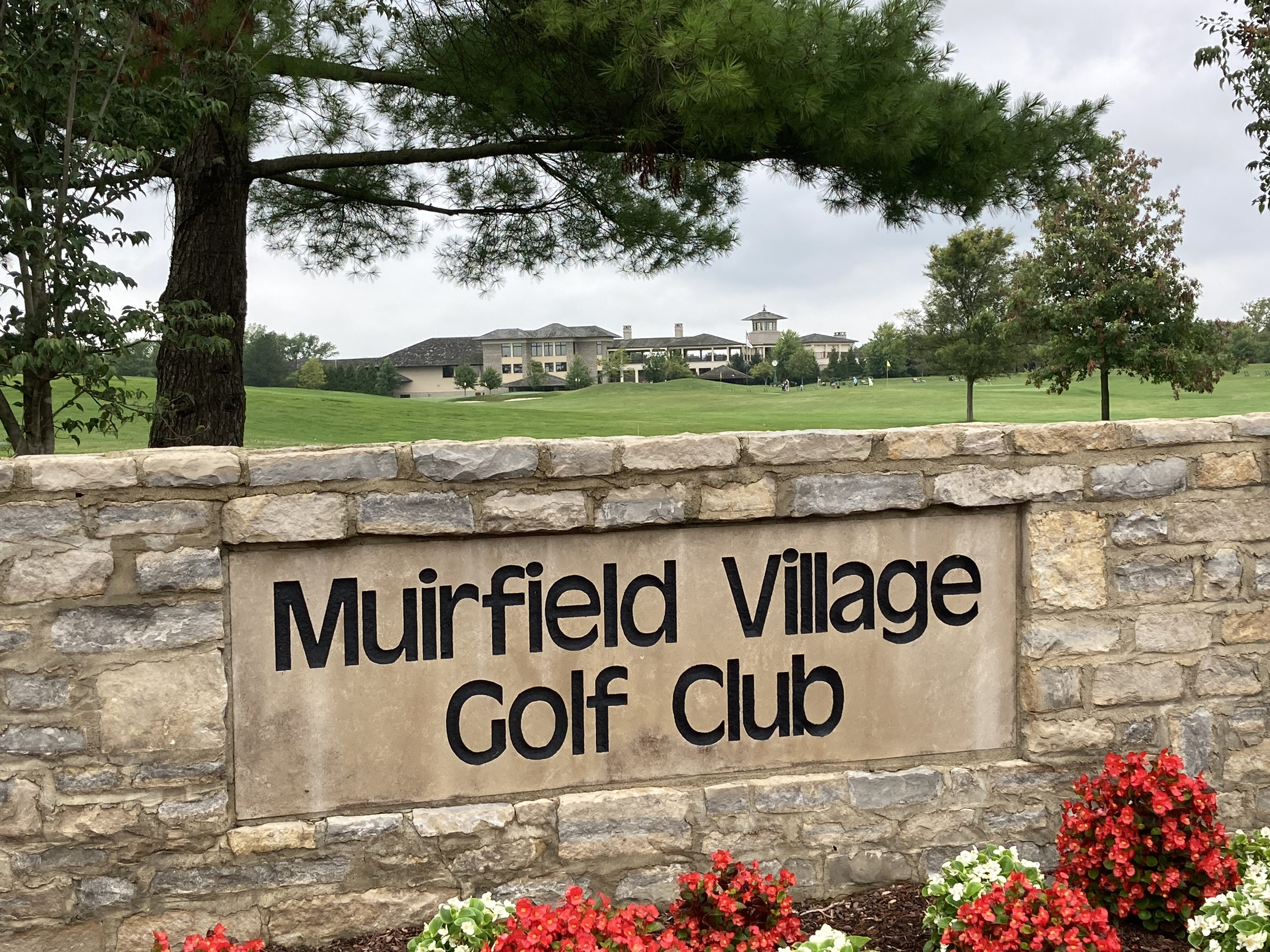
Muirfield Village Golf Club

The Workday Charity Open was a professional golf tournament on the PGA Tour played in 2020, intended to serve as a one-time replacement for the John Deere Classic, which was cancelled due to the COVID-19 pandemic. The tournament was played at Muirfield Village in Dublin, Ohio, the week before the Memorial Tournament, hosted at the same venue. Spectators were not allowed due to the ongoing pandemic.

Collin Morikawa won the tournament in a sudden-death playoff against Justin Thomas; both players tied at 269 (19 under par) after 72 holes, before Morikawa secured victory with a par on the third extra hole.

== Winners ==
| Year | Winner | Score | To par | Margin of victory | Runner-up | Purse ($) | Winner's share ($) |
|---|---|---|---|---|---|---|---|
| 2020 | (United States) Collin Morikawa | 269 | −19 | Playoff (Note: Morikawa won with a par on the third hole of a sudden-death playoff.) | (United States) Justin Thomas | 6,200,000 | 1,116,000 |
