= Baycurrent Classic =

Golf tournament

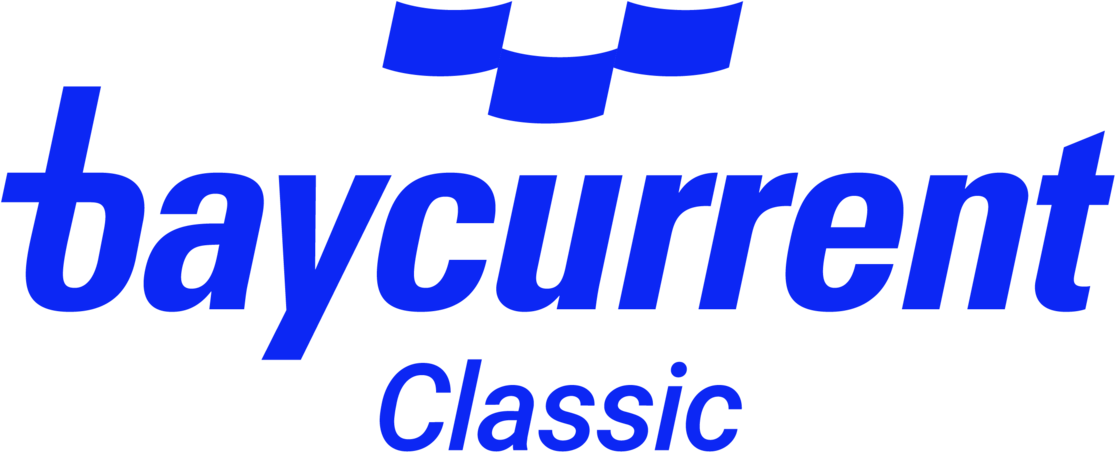

Tournament information
- Location: Yokohama, Kanagawa Prefecture, Japan
- Established: 2019
- Course: Yokohama Country Club
- Par: 71
- Length: 7,315 yards (6,689 m)
- Organized by: PGA Tour
- Tours: PGA Tour; Japan Golf Tour
- Format: Stroke play
- Prize fund: US$8,000,000
- Month played: October
- Website: baycurrentclassic.com

Tournament record score
- Aggregate: 260 Nico Echavarría (2024)
- To par: −23 Patrick Cantlay (2020)

Current champion
- (United States) Michael Brennan

Location map
- Location in Japan

The Baycurrent Classic (Japanese: ベイカレントクラシック) is a professional golf tournament in Yokohama, Japan. It is co-sanctioned by the PGA Tour and the Japan Golf Tour. It was founded as the Zozo Championship in 2019 and sponsored by Zozo, a Japanese clothing brand. In 2025, the sponsorship changed to Baycurrent, a Japanese consulting firm and the tournament moved to Yokohama Country Club.

== History ==
The tournament is the first event sanctioned by the PGA Tour in Japan. The inaugural event was held at Narashino Country Club where Tiger Woods won his 82nd PGA Tour victory. This tied the all-time record set by Sam Snead.

In 2020, the tournament was moved to Sherwood Country Club in Lake Sherwood, California in October, due to ongoing travel restrictions because of the COVID-19 pandemic. Ultimately, the 2020 event became a sole-sanctioned PGA Tour event and had no involvement from the Japan Golf Tour.

The tournament returned to Japan in 2021 as well as being sanctioned by both the PGA Tour and the Japan Golf Tour. However, it was an unofficial money event on the Japan Golf Tour. Hideki Matsuyama eagled the final hole to win in his home country by five shots ahead of Brendan Steele and Cameron Tringale.

In December 2024, it was announced that Zozo would no longer sponsor the tournament from 2025 onwards, with the tournament being renamed as the Baycurrent Classic.

== Course ==
Yokohama Country Club, established in 1958, and opened in 1960, is a 36-hole facility featuring East and West courses originally designed by the club's founder and first chairman the late Takeo Aiyama. The West Course was remodeled by Bill Coore and Ben Crenshaw in 2016. The course will see the field take on a composite of both layouts, including 16 holes from the West Course and two holes from the East Course.

== Winners ==
Year	Tour(s) (Note: JPN − Japan Golf Tour; PGAT − PGA Tour.)	Winner	Score	To par	Margin of victory	Runner(s)-up	Purse ($)	Winner's share ($)	Venue
Baycurrent Classic
2026	JPN, (Note: Between 2020 and 2025 the event was sanctioned by the Japan Golf Tour, however it was an unofficial money event; therefore the win is considered unofficial on that tour.) PGAT	(United States) Michael Brennan	268	−16	1 stroke	(United States) Jacob Bridgeman (United States) Keith Mitchell	8,000,000	1,440,000	Yokohama, Japan
2025	JPN, PGAT	(United States) Xander Schauffele	265	−19	1 stroke	(United States) Max Greyserman	8,000,000	1,440,000	Yokohama, Japan
Zozo Championship
2024	JPN, PGAT	(Colombia) Nico Echavarría	260	−20	1 stroke	(United States) Max Greyserman (United States) Justin Thomas	8,500,000	1,530,000	Narashino, Japan
2023	JPN, PGAT	(United States) Collin Morikawa	266	−14	6 strokes	(United States) Eric Cole (United States) Beau Hossler	8,500,000	1,530,000	Narashino, Japan
2022	JPN, PGAT	(United States) Keegan Bradley	265	−15	1 stroke	(United States) Rickie Fowler (United States) Andrew Putnam	11,000,000	1,980,000	Narashino, Japan
2021	JPN, PGAT	(Japan) Hideki Matsuyama	265	−15	5 strokes	(United States) Brendan Steele (United States) Cameron Tringale	9,950,000	1,791,000	Narashino, Japan
2020	JPN, PGAT	(United States) Patrick Cantlay	265	−23	1 stroke	(Spain) Jon Rahm (United States) Justin Thomas	8,000,000	1,440,000	Sherwood, U.S.
2019	JPN, PGAT	(United States) Tiger Woods	261	−19	3 strokes	(Japan) Hideki Matsuyama	9,750,000	1,755,000	Narashino, Japan
