= 2019–20 PGA Tour =

Golf tour season

2019–20 PGA Tour season
- Duration: September 12, 2019 – September 7, 2020
- Number of official events: 36 (Note: A further 13 tournaments were scheduled but were either canceled or postponed.)
- Most wins: (United States) Dustin Johnson (3) (United States) Justin Thomas (3)
- FedEx Cup: (United States) Dustin Johnson
- Money list: (United States) Justin Thomas
- PGA Tour Player of the Year: (United States) Dustin Johnson
- PGA Player of the Year: (United States) Justin Thomas
- Rookie of the Year: (United States) Scottie Scheffler

The 2019–20 PGA Tour was the 105th season of the PGA Tour, the main professional golf tour in the United States. It was also the 52nd season since separating from the PGA of America, and the 14th edition of the FedEx Cup.

== Changes for 2019–20 ==
=== Rule changes ===
The number of players making a 36-hole cut was reduced from top 70 and ties to top 65 and ties. The 54-hole secondary cut, previously in effect when more than 78 players made a 36-hole cut, was eliminated.

=== Tournament changes ===
- Date changes: in order to accommodate the 2020 Summer Olympics, the WGC-FedEx St. Jude Invitational and the alternate Barracuda Championship were both scheduled for early July, two weeks earlier than the previous season, with the 3M Open moving the other way, to late July. Several other tournaments also had new dates: the Rocket Mortgage Classic (from late June to late May); the Sanderson Farms Championship (from late October to mid September); the Shriners Hospitals for Children Open (from early November to early October).
- Returning tournaments: the Greenbrier Classic and the Houston Open returned having been missing in 2018–19 due to scheduling changes; the Greenbrier, having moved from July to September, became the new season opening event, and the Houston Open was in mid-October having been held in April, the week prior to the Masters Tournament, since 2007.
- New tournaments: Zozo Championship (Japan), Bermuda Championship (created as a new alternate event to the WGC-HSBC Champions). The Workday Charity Open was also created as a new, one-off event in response to scheduling changes caused by the COVID-19 pandemic.
- Status changes: the Sanderson Farms Championship was upgraded from an alternate event to a full FedEx Cup point event; the Genesis Open gained invitational status and was renamed the Genesis Invitational with Tiger Woods as the tournament host.
- No longer on the schedule: CIMB Classic (Malaysia).

== COVID-19 pandemic impact ==
The season was effectively suspended on March 12 with the cancellation of The Players Championship after the first round due to growing concerns surrounding the COVID-19 pandemic. Several more tournaments were later canceled or postponed, including all four major championships, the two remaining World Golf Championships and the Tokyo Summer Olympics. The tour resumed on June 11 with the Charles Schwab Challenge, with measures in place to mitigate the risk of virus transmission. The following week at the RBC Heritage, Nick Watney became to first player to test positive for coronavirus.

The tournament schedule was significantly impacted by the COVID-19 pandemic. The tour played the first round of the 2020 Players Championship on March 12, and stated that subsequent rounds and tournaments would continue behind closed doors. However, the PGA Tour later announced that, "based on the rapidly changing situation", the rest of the tournament had been cancelled, as well as the next three events on the schedule (the Valspar Championship, WGC-Dell Technologies Match Play, and Valero Texas Open). On March 13, Augusta National Golf Club announced that it would postpone the Masters Tournament; the first men's major of the golf season; the tournament was to begin April 9. On March 17, the tour announced the cancellation of all scheduled tournaments through May 10 (the RBC Heritage, Zurich Classic of New Orleans, Wells Fargo Championship and AT&T Byron Nelson) and confirmed the postponement of the PGA Championship, scheduled to begin May 14, by the PGA of America.

On April 16, the tour announced several changes to the remaining schedule, with the intention of restarting with the Charles Schwab Challenge, which was moved from May 18–24 to June 11–14. Several tournaments were also rescheduled, including the RBC Heritage (which had earlier been canceled) the Memorial Tournament and the WGC-FedEx St. Jude Invitational, and others were canceled, including the RBC Canadian Open. Furthermore, the tour also announced that three invitationals (Colonial, Heritage, Memorial) would be expanded from the usual 120-player field to become full-field (144 golfer) events.

During the hiatus, two charity exhibition matches were held. The first was a skins game, titled as the "TaylorMade Driving Relief", held at Seminole Golf Club in Juno Beach, Florida on May 17, featuring Rory McIlroy, Dustin Johnson, Rickie Fowler and Matthew Wolff. The second was a better ball pro-celebrity match play, titled as The Match: Champions for Charity, featuring Tiger Woods and Peyton Manning against Phil Mickelson and Tom Brady.

The tour resumed without spectators in mid-June with the Charles Schwab Challenge. The Memorial Tournament in mid-July was planned to be the first event to welcome back fans, but those plans were canceled the week before the tournament. On July 13, the tour announced that the remainder of the season would be played behind closed doors.

== Schedule ==
The following table lists official events during the 2019–20 season.

Date	Tournament	Location	Purse (US$)	Winner (Note: The number in parentheses after each winner's name is the number of PGA Tour events they had won up to and including that tournament. This information is only shown for PGA Tour members.)	OWGR points	Other tours (Note: JPN − Japan Golf Tour.)	Notes
Sep 15	A Military Tribute at The Greenbrier	West Virginia	7,500,000	(Chile) Joaquín Niemann (1)	32		
Sep 22	Sanderson Farms Championship	Mississippi	6,600,000	(Colombia) Sebastián Muñoz (1)	26		
Sep 29	Safeway Open	California	6,600,000	(United States) Cameron Champ (2)	48		
Oct 6	Shriners Hospitals for Children Open	Nevada	7,000,000	(United States) Kevin Na (4)	54		
Oct 13	Houston Open	Texas	7,500,000	(United States) Lanto Griffin (1)	24		
Oct 20	CJ Cup	South Korea	9,750,000	(United States) Justin Thomas (11)	52		Limited-field event
Oct 28	Zozo Championship	Japan	9,750,000	(United States) Tiger Woods (82)	64	JPN	New limited-field event
Nov 3	WGC-HSBC Champions	China	10,250,000	(Northern Ireland) Rory McIlroy (18)	60		World Golf Championship
Nov 3	Bermuda Championship	Bermuda	3,000,000	(United States) Brendon Todd (2)	24		New tournament Alternate event
Nov 18	Mayakoba Golf Classic	Mexico	7,200,000	(United States) Brendon Todd (3)	34		
Nov 24	RSM Classic	Georgia	6,600,000	(United States) Tyler Duncan (1)	28		
Jan 5	Sentry Tournament of Champions	Hawaii	6,700,000	(United States) Justin Thomas (12)	48		Winners-only event
Jan 12	Sony Open in Hawaii	Hawaii	6,600,000	(Australia) Cameron Smith (2)	46		
Jan 19	The American Express	California	6,700,000	(United States) Andrew Landry (2)	40		Pro-Am
Jan 26	Farmers Insurance Open	California	7,500,000	(Australia) Marc Leishman (5)	54		
Feb 2	Waste Management Phoenix Open	Arizona	7,300,000	(United States) Webb Simpson (6)	54		
Feb 9	AT&T Pebble Beach Pro-Am	California	7,800,000	(Canada) Nick Taylor (2)	42		Pro-Am
Feb 16	Genesis Invitational	California	9,300,000	(Australia) Adam Scott (14)	70		Invitational
Feb 23	WGC-Mexico Championship	Mexico	10,500,000	(United States) Patrick Reed (8)	70		World Golf Championship
Feb 23	Puerto Rico Open	Puerto Rico	3,000,000	(Norway) Viktor Hovland (1)	24		Alternate event
Mar 1	The Honda Classic	Florida	7,000,000	(South Korea) Im Sung-jae (1)	46		
Mar 8	Arnold Palmer Invitational	Florida	9,300,000	(England) Tyrrell Hatton (1)	66		Invitational
Mar 15	The Players Championship	Florida	–	Canceled after round one (Note: Canceled due to the COVID-19 pandemic.)	–		Flagship event
~~Mar 22~~	Valspar Championship	Florida	–	Canceled	–		
~~Mar 29~~	WGC-Dell Technologies Match Play	Texas	–	Canceled	–		World Golf Championship
~~Mar 29~~	Corales Puntacana Resort and Club Championship	Dominican Republic	–	Postponed (Note: Postponed into the 2020–21 season.)	–		Alternate event
~~Apr 5~~	Valero Texas Open	Texas	–	Canceled	–		
~~Apr 12~~	Masters Tournament	Georgia	–	Postponed	–		Major championship
~~Apr 26~~	Zurich Classic of New Orleans	Louisiana	–	Canceled	–		Team event
~~May 3~~	Wells Fargo Championship	North Carolina	–	Canceled	–		
~~May 10~~	AT&T Byron Nelson	Texas	–	Canceled	–		
~~Jun 14~~	RBC Canadian Open	Canada	–	Canceled	–		
Jun 14; ~~May 24~~	Charles Schwab Challenge	Texas	7,500,000	(United States) Daniel Berger (3)	72		
~~Jun 21~~	U.S. Open	New York	–	Postponed	–		Major championship
Jun 21; ~~Apr 19~~	RBC Heritage	South Carolina	7,100,000	(United States) Webb Simpson (7)	72		
Jun 28	Travelers Championship	Connecticut	7,400,000	(United States) Dustin Johnson (21)	68		
Jul 5; ~~May 31~~	Rocket Mortgage Classic	Michigan	7,500,000	(United States) Bryson DeChambeau (6)	48		
~~Jul 12~~	John Deere Classic	Illinois	–	Canceled	–		
Jul 12	Workday Charity Open	Ohio	6,200,000	(United States) Collin Morikawa (2)	62		New tournament
~~Jul 19~~	The Open Championship	England	–	Canceled	–		Major championship
~~Jul 19~~	Barbasol Championship	Kentucky	–	Canceled	–		Alternate event
Jul 19; ~~Jun 7~~	Memorial Tournament	Ohio	9,300,000	(Spain) Jon Rahm (4)	76		
Jul 26	3M Open	Minnesota	6,600,000	(United States) Michael Thompson (2)	38		
Aug 2; ~~Jul 5~~	WGC-FedEx St. Jude Invitational	Tennessee	10,500,000	(United States) Justin Thomas (13)	76		World Golf Championship
Aug 2; ~~Jul 5~~	Barracuda Championship	California	3,500,000	(United States) Richy Werenski (1)	24		Alternate event
Aug 9; ~~May 17~~	PGA Championship	California	11,000,000	(United States) Collin Morikawa (3)	100		Major championship
Aug 16; ~~Aug 9~~	Wyndham Championship	North Carolina	6,400,000	(United States) Jim Herman (3)	50		
Aug 23; ~~Aug 16~~	The Northern Trust	Massachusetts	9,500,000	(United States) Dustin Johnson (22)	76		FedEx Cup playoff event
Aug 30; ~~Aug 23~~	BMW Championship	Illinois	9,500,000	(Spain) Jon Rahm (5)	70		FedEx Cup playoff event
Sep 7; ~~Aug 30~~	Tour Championship	Georgia	n/a (Note: The Tour Championship has no stand-alone purse and does not carry official money; the tournament directly determines the assignment of the FedEx Cup bonus pool money, including US$15,000,000 to the winner.)	(United States) Dustin Johnson (23)	58 (Note: OWGR points at the Tour Championship were awarded based on aggregate scores only (see Tour Championship format). Xander Schauffele had the lowest aggregate score and was awarded with the 58 points. Johnson, who tied for third-lowest aggregate score, received 20.3 points.)		FedEx Cup playoff event

=== Unofficial events ===
The following events were sanctioned by the PGA Tour, but did not carry FedEx Cup points or official money, nor were wins official.

Date	Tournament	Location	Purse ($)	Winner(s)	OWGR points	Notes
Oct 21	MGM Resorts The Challenge: Japan Skins	Japan	350,000	(Australia) Jason Day	n/a	Limited-field event
Dec 7	Hero World Challenge	Bahamas	3,500,000	(Sweden) Henrik Stenson	46	Limited-field event
Dec 15	Presidents Cup	Australia	n/a	Team USA	n/a	Team event
Dec 15	QBE Shootout	Florida	3,300,000	(Slovakia) Rory Sabbatini and (United States) Kevin Tway	n/a	Team event
~~Aug 2~~	Olympic Games	Japan	n/a	Postponed	–	Limited-field event

== Location of tournaments ==
The tournament locations below represent the original schedule, before any changes due to the COVID-19 pandemic.

Location of official tournaments of the 2019–20 PGA Tour in the continental United States and Canada.
600-point event (Players & Majors)
550-point event (World Golf Championships)
500-point event (Regular events)
400-point event (Official team event)
300-point event (Alternate events)
FedEx Cup playoff event
Location of official tournaments of the 2019–20 PGA Tour outside the continental United States and Canada.
600-point event (Players & Majors)
550-point event (World Golf Championships)
500-point event (Regular events)
300-point event (Alternate events)

== FedEx Cup ==
=== Points distribution ===
The distribution of points for 2019–20 PGA Tour events were as follows:

Finishing position	1st	2nd	3rd	4th	5th	6th	7th	8th	9th	10th	20th	30th	40th	50th	60th
Majors & Players Championship	600	330	210	150	120	110	100	94	88	82	51	32	18	10	6
World Golf Championships	550	315	200	140	115	105	95	89	83	78	51	32	18	10	6
Other PGA Tour events	500	300	190	135	110	100	90	85	80	75	45	28	16	8.5	5
Team event (each player)	400	163	105	88	78	68	59	54	50	46	17	5	2	0	0
Alternate events	300	165	105	80	65	60	55	50	45	40	28	17	10	5	3
Playoff events (Note: Due to the shortened regular-season schedule, points awarded in FedEx Cup playoff events were reduced to 3 times those of a regular event (usually 4 times).)	1500	900	570	405	440	330	270	255	240	225	135	84	48	25.5	15

Tour Championship starting score (to par), based on position in the FedEx Cup rankings after the BMW Championship:

Position	1st	2nd	3rd	4th	5th	6th–10th	11th–15th	16th–20th	21st–25th	26th–30th
Starting score	−10	−8	−7	−6	−5	−4	−3	−2	−1	E

=== Final standings ===
For full rankings, see 2020 FedEx Cup Playoffs.

Final FedEx Cup standings of the 30 qualifiers for the Tour Championship:

Pos.	Player		Majors & The Players					WGCs				Top 10s in other PGA Tour events							Regular season points	Playoffs (Note: The top 125 point scorers in the regular season retain their tour card for the following season, and qualify for The Northern Trust. The top 70 points scorers after The Northern Trust qualify for the BMW Championship.)		Total points	Tour C'ship (Note: The top 30 point scorers after the BMW Championship qualify for the Tour Championship. Each player begins with a score adjustment to par determined by their point ranking, the lowest scorers in the Tour Championship in addition to this adjustment win the FedEx Cup.)		Tmts	Money ($m) (Note: In addition to tournament prize money, the top 10 regular season point scorers receive a share of a US$10,000,000 bonus, and the US$60,000,000 FedEx Cup postseason bonus money is distributed based upon standings after the Tour Championship.)		
Pos.	Nat.	Name	Ply	Mas	PGA	USO	Opn	WGC Cha	WGC Mex	WGC MP	WGC Inv	1	2	3	4	5	6	7	Regular season points	NTr	BMW	Total points	Start	Final	Tmts	Basic	Wynd Top10	FedEx Bonus
1	(United States)	D. Johnson	C A N C E L E D	P O S T P O N E D T O 2; 0; 2; 0 - 2; 1 S E A S O N	T2	P O S T P O N E D T O 2; 0; 2; 0 - 2; 1 S E A S O N	C A N C E L E D	•	T48	C A N C E L E D	T12	T7	T10	1st					1,071	1st	2nd	3,471	−10	–21	13	5.84		15.00
T2	(United States)	Schauffele	C A N C E L E D	P O S T P O N E D T O 2; 0; 2; 0 - 2; 1 S E A S O N	T10	P O S T P O N E D T O 2; 0; 2; 0 - 2; 1 S E A S O N	C A N C E L E D	2nd	T14	C A N C E L E D	T6	T10	T2	T3					1,258	T25	T25	1,449	−3	–18	17	3.81		4.50
T2	(United States)	Thomas	C A N C E L E D	P O S T P O N E D T O 2; 0; 2; 0 - 2; 1 S E A S O N	T37	P O S T P O N E D T O 2; 0; 2; 0 - 2; 1 S E A S O N	C A N C E L E D	•	T6	C A N C E L E D	1st	T4	1st	1st	T3	T10	T8	2nd	2,458	T49	T25	2,570	−7	–18	17	7.34	2.00	4.50
4	(Spain)	Rahm	C A N C E L E D	P O S T P O N E D T O 2; 0; 2; 0 - 2; 1 S E A S O N	T13	P O S T P O N E D T O 2; 0; 2; 0 - 2; 1 S E A S O N	C A N C E L E D	•	T3	C A N C E L E D	T52	2nd	T9	1st					1,295	T6	1st	3,080	−8	–17	14	5.96	0.50	3.00
5	(United States)	Scheffler	C A N C E L E D	P O S T P O N E D T O 2; 0; 2; 0 - 2; 1 S E A S O N	T4	P O S T P O N E D T O 2; 0; 2; 0 - 2; 1 S E A S O N	C A N C E L E D	•	T26	C A N C E L E D	T15	T7	T3	T5	3rd				900	T4	T20	1,391	−2	–14	22	2.83		2.50
6	(United States)	Morikawa	C A N C E L E D	P O S T P O N E D T O 2; 0; 2; 0 - 2; 1 S E A S O N	1st	P O S T P O N E D T O 2; 0; 2; 0 - 2; 1 S E A S O N	C A N C E L E D	•	T42	C A N C E L E D	T12	T10	T7	T9	2nd	1st			1,902	CUT	T20	2,025	−5	–13	20	5.26	1.50	1.90
7	(England)	Hatton	C A N C E L E D	P O S T P O N E D T O 2; 0; 2; 0 - 2; 1 S E A S O N	CUT	P O S T P O N E D T O 2; 0; 2; 0 - 2; 1 S E A S O N	C A N C E L E D	T14	T6	C A N C E L E D	T69	T6	1st	T3	T4				1,025	T25	T16	1,275	−2	–12	10	3.43		1.30
T8	(Northern Ireland)	McIlroy	C A N C E L E D	P O S T P O N E D T O 2; 0; 2; 0 - 2; 1 S E A S O N	T33	P O S T P O N E D T O 2; 0; 2; 0 - 2; 1 S E A S O N	C A N C E L E D	1st	5th	C A N C E L E D	T47	T3	T3	T5	T5				1,327	T65	T12	1,516	−3	–11	14	4.41	0.60	0.96
T8	(Colombia)	Muñoz	C A N C E L E D	P O S T P O N E D T O 2; 0; 2; 0 - 2; 1 S E A S O N	CUT	P O S T P O N E D T O 2; 0; 2; 0 - 2; 1 S E A S O N	C A N C E L E D	•	T14	C A N C E L E D	•	T7	1st	3rd					1,045	T18	T8	1,421	−3	–11	25	2.86		0.96
T8	(United States)	Reed	C A N C E L E D	P O S T P O N E D T O 2; 0; 2; 0 - 2; 1 S E A S O N	T13	P O S T P O N E D T O 2; 0; 2; 0 - 2; 1 S E A S O N	C A N C E L E D	T8	1st	C A N C E L E D	T47	T2	T6	T7	T10	T9			1,426	T49	T40	1,485	−3	–11	19	4.25	0.85	0.96
11	(South Korea)	Im	C A N C E L E D	P O S T P O N E D T O 2; 0; 2; 0 - 2; 1 S E A S O N	CUT	P O S T P O N E D T O 2; 0; 2; 0 - 2; 1 S E A S O N	C A N C E L E D	T11	T29	C A N C E L E D	T35	2nd	T3	T10	1st	3rd	T10	T9	1,633	CUT	T56	1,650	−4	–10	25	4.34	1.00	0.75
T12	(United States)	English	C A N C E L E D	P O S T P O N E D T O 2; 0; 2; 0 - 2; 1 S E A S O N	T19	P O S T P O N E D T O 2; 0; 2; 0 - 2; 1 S E A S O N	C A N C E L E D	•	•	C A N C E L E D	•	T3	T6	T4	5th	T9			867	2nd	T40	1,805	−4	–9	19	3.30		0.68
T12	(United States)	Simpson	C A N C E L E D	P O S T P O N E D T O 2; 0; 2; 0 - 2; 1 S E A S O N	T37	P O S T P O N E D T O 2; 0; 2; 0 - 2; 1 S E A S O N	C A N C E L E D	•	T61	C A N C E L E D	T12	T7	2nd	3rd	1st	1st	T8	T3	1,878	T6	•	2,163	−6	–9	13	5.10	1.20	0.68
14	(Canada)	Hughes	C A N C E L E D	P O S T P O N E D T O 2; 0; 2; 0 - 2; 1 S E A S O N	T58	P O S T P O N E D T O 2; 0; 2; 0 - 2; 1 S E A S O N	C A N C E L E D	•	•	C A N C E L E D	T44	2nd	T3	T6					842	T13	T10	996	E	–8	21	2.08		0.62
T15	(United States)	Berger	C A N C E L E D	P O S T P O N E D T O 2; 0; 2; 0 - 2; 1 S E A S O N	T13	P O S T P O N E D T O 2; 0; 2; 0 - 2; 1 S E A S O N	C A N C E L E D	•	•	C A N C E L E D	T2	T9	T5	T4	1st	T3			1,347	3rd	T25	2,007	−4	–7	16	4.44	0.70	0.58
T15	(Japan)	Matsuyama	C A N C E L E D	P O S T P O N E D T O 2; 0; 2; 0 - 2; 1 S E A S O N	T22	P O S T P O N E D T O 2; 0; 2; 0 - 2; 1 S E A S O N	C A N C E L E D	T11	T6	C A N C E L E D	T20	T3	2nd	T5					1,030	T29	T3	1,587	−4	–7	19	3.67		0.58
17	(United States)	Finau	C A N C E L E D	P O S T P O N E D T O 2; 0; 2; 0 - 2; 1 S E A S O N	T4	P O S T P O N E D T O 2; 0; 2; 0 - 2; 1 S E A S O N	C A N C E L E D	T53	•	C A N C E L E D	T65	T9	T6	2nd	8th	T3			907	CUT	T5	1,237	−2	–6	19	2.93		0.55
T18	(Mexico)	Ancer	C A N C E L E D	P O S T P O N E D T O 2; 0; 2; 0 - 2; 1 S E A S O N	T43	P O S T P O N E D T O 2; 0; 2; 0 - 2; 1 S E A S O N	C A N C E L E D	T4	T12	C A N C E L E D	T15	T8	2nd	2nd					1,099	CUT	T33	1,159	−1	–5	19	2.90		0.53
T18	(United States)	Griffin	C A N C E L E D	P O S T P O N E D T O 2; 0; 2; 0 - 2; 1 S E A S O N	T19	P O S T P O N E D T O 2; 0; 2; 0 - 2; 1 S E A S O N	C A N C E L E D	•	T29	C A N C E L E D	•	1st	T7	T9					1,159	T58	T10	1,392	−2	–5	26	3.19		0.53
T20	(Norway)	Hovland	C A N C E L E D	P O S T P O N E D T O 2; 0; 2; 0 - 2; 1 S E A S O N	T33	P O S T P O N E D T O 2; 0; 2; 0 - 2; 1 S E A S O N	C A N C E L E D	•	•	C A N C E L E D	T59	T10	1st	3rd					842	T18	T40	1,009	E	–4	19	1.98		0.50
T20	(United States)	Todd	C A N C E L E D	P O S T P O N E D T O 2; 0; 2; 0 - 2; 1 S E A S O N	T17	P O S T P O N E D T O 2; 0; 2; 0 - 2; 1 S E A S O N	C A N C E L E D	•	37	C A N C E L E D	T15	1st	1st	4th					1,316	64th	T8	1,576	−3	–4	24	3.39	0.55	0.50
22	(United States)	DeChambeau	C A N C E L E D	P O S T P O N E D T O 2; 0; 2; 0 - 2; 1 S E A S O N	T4	P O S T P O N E D T O 2; 0; 2; 0 - 2; 1 S E A S O N	C A N C E L E D	•	2nd	C A N C E L E D	T30	T4	T5	4th	T3	T8	T6	1st	1,657	CUT	T50	1,682	−4	–3	16	5.00	1.10	0.48
23	(United States)	Kisner	C A N C E L E D	P O S T P O N E D T O 2; 0; 2; 0 - 2; 1 S E A S O N	T19	P O S T P O N E D T O 2; 0; 2; 0 - 2; 1 S E A S O N	C A N C E L E D	T28	T18	C A N C E L E D	T25	T4	3rd	T3					710	T4	T25	1,169	−1	–1	20	2.27		0.47
T24	(United States)	Champ	C A N C E L E D	P O S T P O N E D T O 2; 0; 2; 0 - 2; 1 S E A S O N	T10	P O S T P O N E D T O 2; 0; 2; 0 - 2; 1 S E A S O N	C A N C E L E D	•	•	C A N C E L E D	T25	1st							951	CUT	T65	963	E	E	19	2.29		0.45
T24	(United States)	Palmer	C A N C E L E D	P O S T P O N E D T O 2; 0; 2; 0 - 2; 1 S E A S O N	T43	P O S T P O N E D T O 2; 0; 2; 0 - 2; 1 S E A S O N	C A N C E L E D	•	•	C A N C E L E D	T15	T4	T8	2nd					837	T8	T40	1,116	−1	E	18	2.72		0.45
T24	(Australia)	Ca. Smith	C A N C E L E D	P O S T P O N E D T O 2; 0; 2; 0 - 2; 1 S E A S O N	T43	P O S T P O N E D T O 2; 0; 2; 0 - 2; 1 S E A S O N	C A N C E L E D	T60	T22	C A N C E L E D	T59	T3	1st						807	T18	T20	1,059	E	E	18	2.37		0.45
T27	(United States)	Na	C A N C E L E D	P O S T P O N E D T O 2; 0; 2; 0 - 2; 1 S E A S O N	CUT	P O S T P O N E D T O 2; 0; 2; 0 - 2; 1 S E A S O N	C A N C E L E D	•	T9	C A N C E L E D	T35	1st	5th	9th					1,036	T39	T51	1,102	−1	+1	20	2.79		0.42
T27	(Chile)	Niemann	C A N C E L E D	P O S T P O N E D T O 2; 0; 2; 0 - 2; 1 S E A S O N	CUT	P O S T P O N E D T O 2; 0; 2; 0 - 2; 1 S E A S O N	C A N C E L E D	•	•	C A N C E L E D	T52	1st	T5	T5					878	CUT	T3	1,366	−2	+1	22	2.91		0.42
29	(Australia)	Leishman	C A N C E L E D	P O S T P O N E D T O 2; 0; 2; 0 - 2; 1 S E A S O N	CUT	P O S T P O N E D T O 2; 0; 2; 0 - 2; 1 S E A S O N	C A N C E L E D	•	T42	C A N C E L E D	T52	3rd	1st	2nd					1,086	CUT	69th	1,096	−1	+2	17	3.11		0.41
30	(United States)	Horschel	C A N C E L E D	P O S T P O N E D T O 2; 0; 2; 0 - 2; 1 S E A S O N	T43	P O S T P O N E D T O 2; 0; 2; 0 - 2; 1 S E A S O N	C A N C E L E D	T24	T9	C A N C E L E D	T25	T6	T8	T9	T7	2nd			893	CUT	T33	953	E	+4	21	2.38		0.40

Win
Top 10
Made cut
Missed cut
• Did not play

== Money list ==
The money list was based on prize money won during the season, calculated in U.S. dollars.

Position	Player	Prize money ($)
1	(United States) Justin Thomas	7,344,040
2	(Spain) Jon Rahm	5,959,819
3	(United States) Dustin Johnson	5,837,267
4	(United States) Collin Morikawa	5,250,868
5	(United States) Webb Simpson	5,097,742
6	(United States) Bryson DeChambeau	4,998,495
7	(United States) Daniel Berger	4,439,420
8	(Northern Ireland) Rory McIlroy	4,408,415
9	(South Korea) Im Sung-jae	4,337,811
10	(United States) Patrick Reed	4,250,060

== Awards ==
Award	Winner	Ref.
PGA Tour Player of the Year (Jack Nicklaus Trophy)	(United States) Dustin Johnson	
PGA Player of the Year	(United States) Justin Thomas	
Rookie of the Year (Arnold Palmer Award)	(United States) Scottie Scheffler	
Scoring leader (PGA Tour – Byron Nelson Award)	(United States) Webb Simpson	
Scoring leader (PGA – Vardon Trophy)	(United States) Webb Simpson	

== See also ==
- 2019 in golf
- 2020 in golf
- 2020–21 Korn Ferry Tour
- 2020–21 PGA Tour Champions season
- 2019–20 PGA Tour priority ranking
