= Patrick Cantlay =

American professional golfer (born 1992)

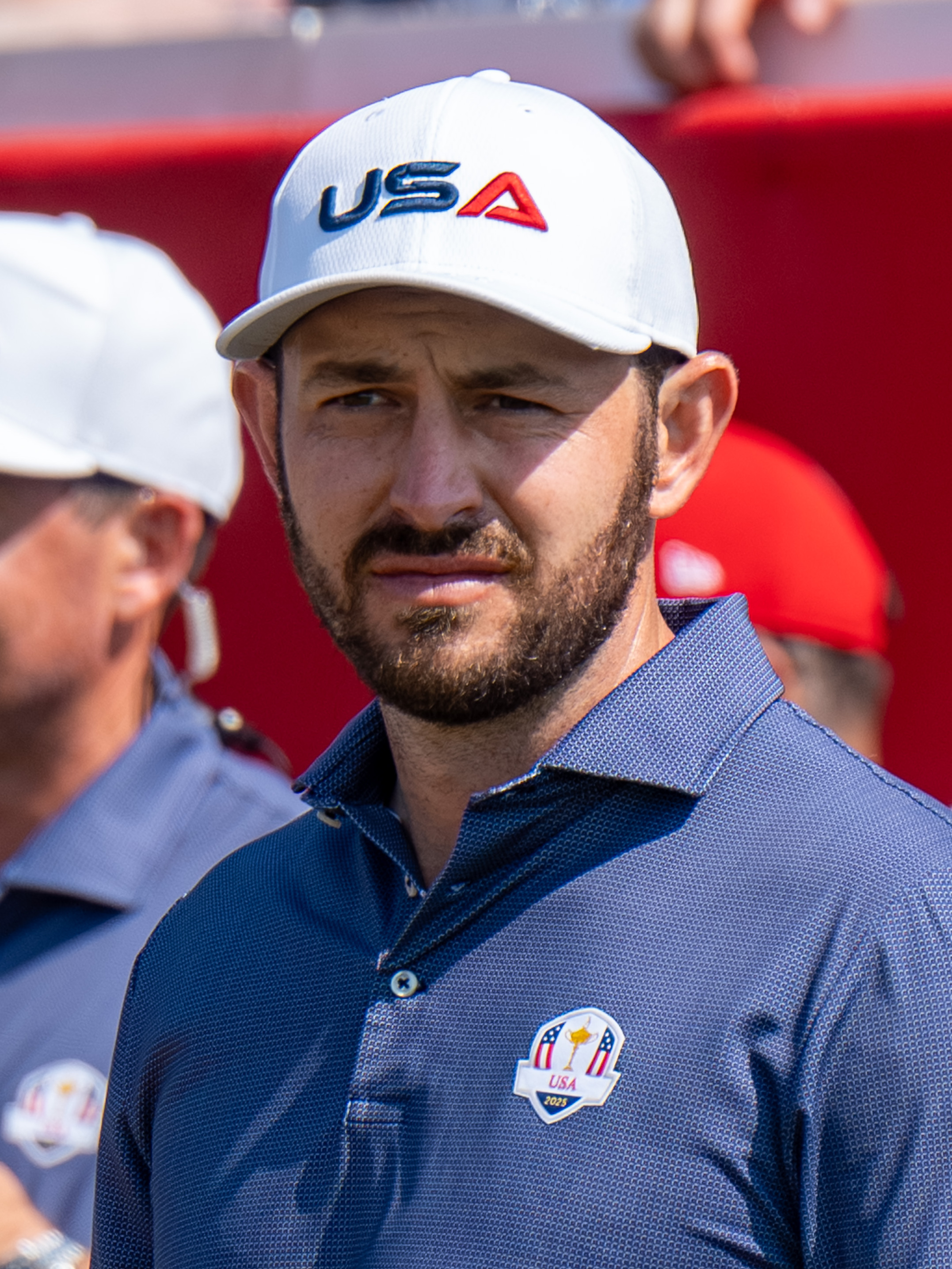
- Cantlay at the 2025 Ryder Cup

Personal information
- Full name: Patrick Stephen Cantlay
- Nickname: Patty Ice
- Nationality: United States
- Born: March 17, 1992 (age 34) Long Beach, California, U.S.
- Height: 6 ft 0 in (1.83 m)
- Weight: 190 lb (86 kg; 14 st)
- Spouse: Nicole Guidish (m. 2023)

Career
- Sport: Golf
- College: UCLA
- Turned professional: 2012
- Current tour: PGA Tour
- Former tours: European Tour; Web.com Tour
- Professional wins: 9
- Highest ranking: 3 (January 23, 2022) (as of November 15, 2026)

Number of wins by tour
- PGA Tour: 8
- Korn Ferry Tour: 1

Best results in major championships
- Masters Tournament: T9: 2019
- PGA Championship: T3: 2019
- U.S. Open: T3: 2024
- The Open Championship: T8: 2022

Achievements and awards
- Jack Nicklaus Award: 2011
- Pac-10 Conference Player of the Year: 2011
- Haskins Award: 2011
- Mark H. McCormack Medal: 2011
- Ben Hogan Award: 2012
- PGA Tour FedEx Cup winner: 2021
- PGA Tour Player of the Year: 2020–21

Patrick Stephen Cantlay (born March 17, 1992) is an American professional golfer who plays on the PGA Tour, where he has won eight tournaments.

During his collegiate career at UCLA, Cantlay was number one in the World Amateur Golf Ranking for 55 weeks and shot a round of 60 on the PGA Tour aged 19. He turned professional in 2012 and won on the Web.com Tour in 2013, securing promotion to the PGA Tour, but struggled with a career-threatening back injury in the following years. Cantlay returned in 2017 and won his first title on the PGA Tour later that year. He reached the top ten of the Official World Golf Ranking for the first time in 2019, and was named the PGA Tour Player of the Year after winning the FedEx Cup in 2021.

== Early life ==
Cantlay was born in Long Beach, California on March 17, 1992, to Colleen (née Neylan) and Steve Cantlay. He is of Irish and Scottish descent. Both his parents attended the University of Southern California and he has three younger siblings: Nick, Caroline, and Jack. Steve worked in real estate and self-storage, and as a golfer won club championships at both Virginia Country Club and Wilshire Country Club. Cantlay's grandfather Pat Neylan had a practice putting and chipping area in his backyard; he introduced Cantlay to golf as a toddler.

Cantlay grew up in Los Alamitos, California. At age seven, he began to receive coaching from PGA of America instructor Jamie Mulligan at Virginia Country Club in Long Beach. Virginia Country Club was home to a number of professional golfers, such as John Cook, Paul Goydos, and John Merrick. Cantlay learned from these players, recalling in 2018: "They would always take me out to play, or if I asked any questions they'd be really helpful." By age 12, Cantlay began to challenge Mike Miles, who played on the PGA Tour in the 1980s, to matches at the club.

Cantlay attended Servite High School, a Catholic school with a noted sports program in Anaheim, California. In his first varsity match, he shot 31 in a nine-hole competition at Western Hills Country Club. He was named high school golfer of the year by The Orange County Register in 2009 and 2010. He was runner-up at the 2010 Southern California Amateur, and won the 2010 California State High School Championship. In June 2010, he was second (behind Jordan Spieth) in a Golfweek Sagarin poll of the top junior golfers in the country, and was named The Orange County Register's boys co-athlete of the year, becoming the first golfer to win that award.

After graduating from Servite, Cantlay finished second in the stroke play at the 2010 U.S. Amateur in August. He advanced to the semifinals of the match play portion held at Chambers Bay, where he was defeated by the eventual champion Peter Uihlein.

== Collegiate career ==
Cantlay committed to the University of California, Los Angeles (UCLA) in 2009. He was a history major. As a freshman, Cantlay won four individual tournaments and finished second in the stroke play at the 2011 NCAA Division I championship. He set a school record with 17 sub-70 rounds and had a 70.5 scoring average for the season. With his fourth win, a six-stroke victory at the NCAA West Regional in May, he set the UCLA record for most individual titles as a freshman. Cantlay won the Pac-10 Freshman and Player of the Year awards, the Phil Mickelson Award as the National Freshman of the Year, the Jack Nicklaus Award as the Division I National Player of the Year, and the Haskins Award as the most outstanding college golfer of the year.

On March 23, 2011, Cantlay became world number one in the World Amateur Golf Ranking. He held the position for a record total of 55 weeks; this record stood until Jon Rahm eclipsed it in 2016. Cantlay won the Mark H. McCormack Medal as the top-ranked amateur in the world at the end of the 2011 season. This earned him an invitation to the 2012 Open Championship.

Cantlay played in the 2011 Palmer Cup in June, helping the United States defeat Europe. The following week, he competed in the 2011 U.S. Open, after earning a place in the field through sectional qualifying. Cantlay was six-over-par through his first 22 holes at Congressional Country Club, but rallied on Friday with a bogey-free 30 on the back nine to make the cut. He ended the week in tied-21st place at even-par 284 to receive low amateur honors.

The week after the 2011 U.S. Open, Cantlay played in the Travelers Championship on the PGA Tour. In the second round, he shot a 10-under 60, which set the course record at TPC River Highlands and was the lowest round by an amateur in PGA Tour history. This gave him the lead headed into the final two rounds. He faded on the weekend and finished in tied-24th. In July, he finished tied-20th at the AT&T National, won the Southern California Amateur, and finished in a tie for ninth place at the RBC Canadian Open. He was ineligible for $356,297 in prize money from the PGA Tour events during this stretch due to his amateur status.

At the 2011 Western Amateur in August, Cantlay lost to Ethan Tracy in the final. Three weeks later, Cantlay reached the final of the U.S. Amateur, where he lost to Kelly Kraft. Cantlay represented the United States at the 2011 Walker Cup in September. He posted a 2–1–1 record, as Great Britain & Ireland defeated the United States by a score of 14 to 12.

During his sophomore season at UCLA, Cantlay made nine starts and had a 71.1 scoring average. He shot rounds of 63-70-70 to finish second at the Gifford Collegiate Invitational held at CordeValle Golf Club in October 2011, which was one of his five top-5 finishes of the season. By reaching the final of the U.S. Amateur, Cantlay earned an invitation to the 2012 Masters Tournament. He made the cut and finished in a tie for 47th, making him the low amateur. He won the 2012 Ben Hogan Award in May as the top collegiate golfer in the country, and finished tied-41st at the 2012 U.S. Open at the Olympic Club in June. He subsequently turned professional. For his achievements, Cantlay was named to the UCLA Athletics Hall of Fame in 2022. He ranked first as of 2022 in UCLA's golf program history with a 70.8 scoring average.

== Professional career ==
=== 2012–2016: Early years and injury struggles ===
In June 2012, Cantlay decided to forgo his final two years of college to turn professional. This meant that he forfeited his spot at the 2012 Open Championship. He signed with Mark Steinberg and Excel Sports Management, the same management team as Tiger Woods. Cantlay made his professional debut at the Travelers Championship. He opened with a 75 and followed with a 67 to miss the cut by two strokes. He made his first cut as a professional the following week, at the AT&T National. He shot a final-round 82 to finish tied-66th.

Cantlay played in the Chiquita Classic on the Web.com Tour in September 2012 after earning a place in the field through a Monday qualifier. He shot 22-under 266 to finish in a three-way tie for first alongside Russell Henley and Morgan Hoffmann. Henley won the title on the first playoff hole. At the 2012 PGA Tour Qualifying Tournament in December, Cantlay finished nine strokes shy of earning a PGA Tour card. He received sponsors' exemptions to play on the PGA Tour in the first two months of 2013, at the Humana Challenge, Farmers Insurance Open, AT&T Pebble Beach National Pro-Am and Northern Trust Open. He finished tied-ninth at Pebble Beach but missed the cut in the other events.

At the Web.com Tour's Colombia Championship in March 2013, Cantlay shot a final-round 66 to win by four strokes and claim his first victory as a professional. At 20 years, 351 days, he became the second-youngest player to win on the Web.com Tour, after Jason Day who won aged 19. While warming up to play in the Crowne Plaza Invitational on the PGA Tour in May, Cantlay experienced a sharp pain, which he said "felt like somebody stuck a knife in my back". He attempted to play through the pain but ultimately withdrew, and was later diagnosed with a stress fracture in his L5 vertebrae. He did not play for three months afterwards and slid down the Web.com Tour rankings. After missing the cut at the Cox Classic in August, he fell to 29th in the rankings, outside the top 25 required to earn a PGA Tour card. Cantlay finished runner-up at the Hotel Fitness Championship the following week to secure a card for the 2013–14 PGA Tour season.

Cantlay continued to struggle with his back injury and made only six starts on the PGA Tour in 2014, with his best finish being a tie for 23rd. He sat out the entirety of 2015 due to injury. Cantlay planned to make his return at the CareerBuilder Challenge in January 2016, but suffered an injury setback and was advised to take another year to recover. The following month, he witnessed the death of his friend Chris Roth in a hit and run. Cantlay recalled in 2017: "I'm already at the lowest point I could be, I feel so far away from where my goals are, and then that happened. For a while, it just made me feel like nothing was important."

During the injury recovery, Cantlay was unsure if he would ever be able to play golf again. He visited various doctors, and traveled to Germany to undergo the Regenokine procedure, but was informed the back injury necessitated rest. He was unable to participate in strenuous activities and recalled that, aside from a physical therapy appointment each day, "there wasn't much reason to get up in the morning." Cantlay made changes to his warmup routine and training regimen, and his long-time coach Jamie Mulligan stated tweaks were made to Cantlay's swing to reduce strain on the body. In January 2017, Cantlay shot a course-record 63 in a practice round at the Vintage Club in Palm Springs, California.

=== 2017: Return to golf, first PGA Tour victory ===
Cantlay made his return from injury at the AT&T Pebble Beach Pro-Am in February 2017, which was his first professional start since November 2014. He finished tied-48th. This was one of 10 PGA Tour starts he had remaining on his major medical exemption. In his next start, Cantlay finished runner-up at the Valspar Championship in March, one stroke behind Adam Hadwin. This result meant that Cantlay secured his PGA Tour card for the remainder of the season. He tied for third at the RBC Heritage in April, two strokes behind Wesley Bryan.

In his return to tour, Cantlay played a light schedule and prioritized rest. He did not play consecutive weeks until the 2017 FedEx Cup Playoffs began in August. At the first playoff event, The Northern Trust, Cantlay finished tied-10th. The following week, he finished tied-13th at the Dell Technologies Championship. Cantlay then played the BMW Championship, where he birdied the final hole to finish in a tie for ninth. This moved him from 41st to 29th in the season-long rankings and secured qualification for the Tour Championship, despite making only 12 starts during the season. He finished tied-20th at the Tour Championship. Cantlay was nominated for the PGA Tour Rookie of the Year award, but lost out to Xander Schauffele.

At the Shriners Hospitals for Children Open in November, Cantlay shot a 5-under 67 in the final round to enter a three-way playoff for the title, along with Alex Čejka and Whee Kim. After all three players bogeyed the first extra hole, Cantlay won with par on the second hole to secure his first PGA Tour victory. With the win, he received $1,224,000 and a two-year exemption on tour. He also moved inside the top 50 of the Official World Golf Ranking, after starting the year outside the top 1,000.

=== 2018–2020: Reaching the top ten of the world rankings ===
In 2018, Cantlay recorded top-5 finishes at both the Genesis Open and the Memorial Tournament, and qualified for the Tour Championship for the second year in a row. As the defending champion at the 2018 Shriners Hospitals for Children Open in November, he finished solo-second, one stroke behind Bryson DeChambeau.

At the 2019 Masters Tournament in April, Cantlay shot an 8-under 64 in the third round to move into contention. He took the lead in the final round at 12-under after making eagle on the par-5 15th, but dropped two shots in the final three holes to finish tied-ninth, three strokes behind the winner Tiger Woods. This was Cantlay's first top-10 finish in a major championship. In his next major start, at the 2019 PGA Championship held at Bethpage Black in May, he posted 2-under 278 to share third place.

Cantlay won his second PGA Tour title at the Memorial Tournament in June 2019. He shot a final-round 64 to overcome a four-shot deficit after 54 holes. With the win, Cantlay moved to No. 8 in the Official World Golf Ranking, marking the first time he reached the top ten of the world rankings. In August, he finished runner-up at the BMW Championship, three strokes behind Justin Thomas. Cantlay also finished second at the Shriners Hospitals for Children Open in November, where he lost to Kevin Na in a playoff. As a rookie at the 2019 Presidents Cup in December, Cantlay played all five sessions as the U.S. team won 16–14. He had a 3–2–0 record, including a win in the singles against Joaquín Niemann.

In his first start of 2020, Cantlay finished fourth at the Sentry Tournament of Champions. The PGA Tour was suspended from March to June due to the COVID-19 pandemic. After the resumption of the tour, Cantlay finished tied-seventh at the Workday Charity Open in July. In October, Cantlay claimed his third victory on the PGA Tour at the Zozo Championship. He shot 23-under 265 to finish one stroke ahead of Jon Rahm and Justin Thomas.

=== 2021: FedEx Cup winner, PGA Tour Player of the Year ===
At The American Express in January 2021, Cantlay made the halfway cut on the number. He finished with an 11-under 61, which broke the course record at PGA West's Stadium Course, to post 22-under 266 and hold the clubhouse lead. He ultimately placed solo-second, one stroke behind 54-hole leader Si Woo Kim. In February, Cantlay shot a 10-under 62 in the first round of the AT&T Pebble Beach Pro-Am, which tied the course record at Pebble Beach Golf Links. He finished the tournament in a tie for third.

In June, Cantlay won the Memorial Tournament for a second time. He tied for first at 13-under and defeated Collin Morikawa in the ensuing playoff. Cantlay won his second tournament of the year at the BMW Championship in August. He was tied for first at 27-under 271 with Bryson DeChambeau, and won on the sixth hole of a sudden-death playoff. During the tournament, Cantlay gained 14.58 strokes on the field with his putting, which was the most in a 72-hole tournament since strokes gained data began to be tracked on the PGA Tour in 2004.

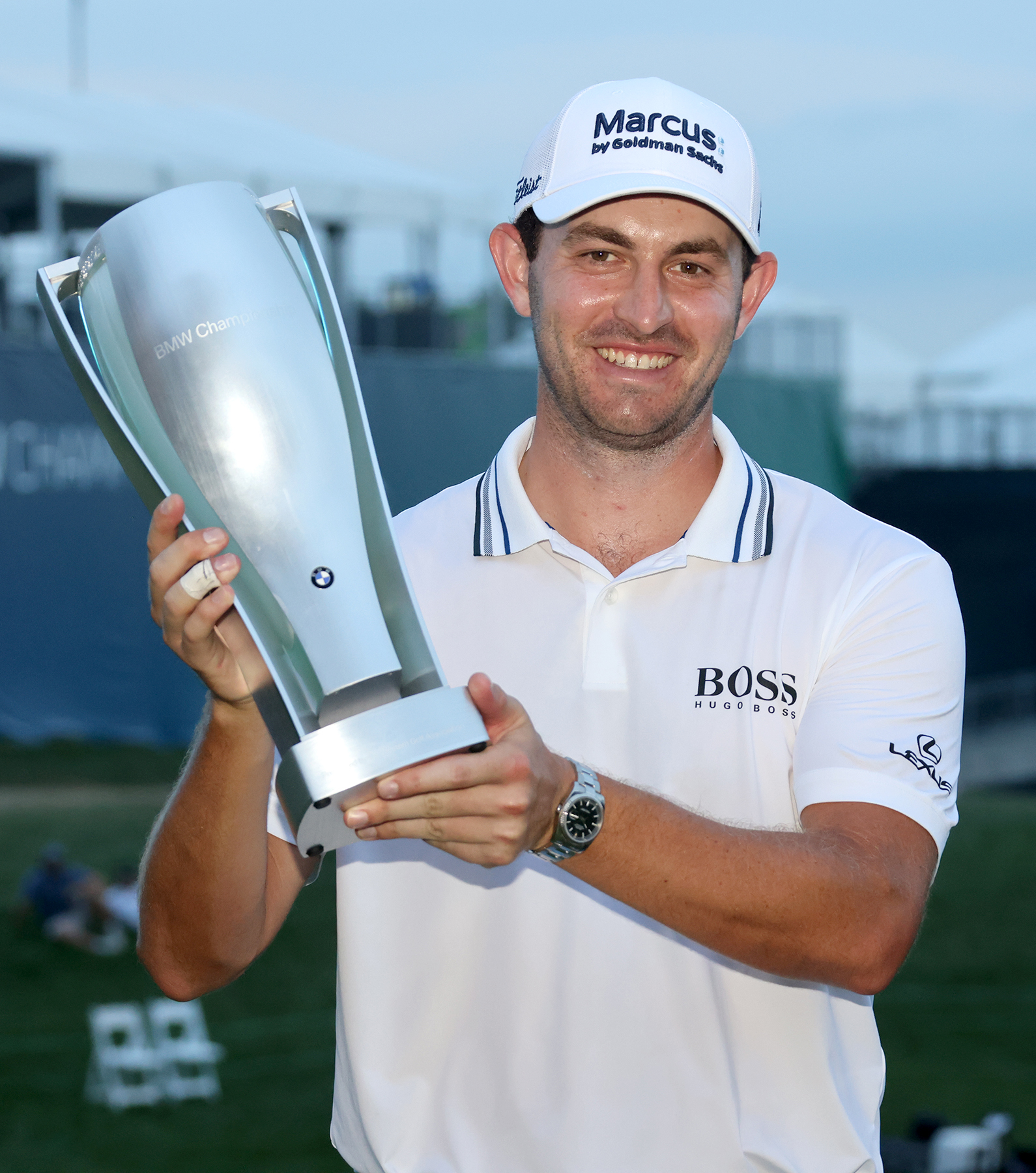
Cantlay at the 2021 BMW Championship

As the leader in the FedEx Cup standings, Cantlay entered the Tour Championship in September at 10-under-par in the starting strokes format. Prior to the tournament, he criticized the starting strokes format, stating: "I dislike the fact that no one knows, when they look at the leaderboard, who shot the lowest round this week." He totaled 21-under to win the tournament by one stroke ahead of Jon Rahm. He also won the FedEx Cup title and received the $15 million season-long bonus payout. Later that month, Cantlay was voted the PGA Tour Player of the Year.

Cantlay automatically qualified to represent the United States at the 2021 Ryder Cup, which was his debut in the competition. The United States defeated Europe by a score of 19–9 and Cantlay had an unbeaten 3–0–1 record, including a win in his singles match against Shane Lowry.

=== 2022: Continued success ===
At the WM Phoenix Open in February, Cantlay shot a final-round 67 to tie for first at 16-under 268. He lost on the third hole of a playoff against Scottie Scheffler. Cantlay also finished runner-up at the RBC Heritage in April, where he lost in a playoff to Jordan Spieth. The following week, Cantlay and Xander Schauffele shot a best-ball 59 in the first round of the Zurich Classic of New Orleans. They ultimately won the event by two strokes over Sam Burns and Billy Horschel. This was Cantlay's seventh PGA Tour title.

Cantlay finished tied-third as defending champion at the Memorial Tournament in June. He finished tied-eighth at the 2022 Open Championship, held at the Old Course at St Andrews in July. Afterwards, he stated that he had no plans to leave the PGA Tour to join LIV Golf. Later in July, Cantlay finished tied-second at the Rocket Mortgage Classic, five strokes behind Tony Finau.

In August, Cantlay successfully defended his title at the BMW Championship. With the win, he moved to a new high of third in the Official World Golf Ranking. Cantlay qualified for the U.S. team at the 2022 Presidents Cup in September; he had a 3–1–0 record, including a win in his singles match against Adam Scott. At the Shriners Children's Open in October, Cantlay shot a third-round 60 to share the lead after 54 holes. He made a triple bogey on the final hole of the tournament to finish runner-up, three strokes behind Tom Kim.

=== 2023–2025: Winless seasons ===
During the final round of the 2023 Masters Tournament in April, Cantlay played in the penultimate pairing. He shot 75 to finish tied-14th and received criticism for his slow pace of play. The following week, Cantlay was in contention to win the RBC Heritage. He finished in third-place, one stroke outside of a two-way playoff, and was heckled by spectators for his pace of play. After acing the par-3 7th hole in the second round of the RBC Heritage, he posted a video on Twitter of his hole in one with the caption: "Playing faster!" At the FedEx St. Jude Championship in August, Cantlay shot a final-round 64 to tie for the lead. He was defeated in a playoff by Lucas Glover.

Cantlay played for the U.S. team in the 2023 Ryder Cup in September. The European team won 16.5–11.5 and Cantlay went 2–2–0, including a win in the Sunday singles against Justin Rose. During the event, Cantlay refused to wear a team hat. This was reported to be a form to protest to state that players should be paid for playing in Ryder Cup; Cantlay denied this and said the hat simply "didn't fit". The controversy led to European fans nicknaming Cantlay as "No Hat Pat" and chanting "Hats off to your bank account". Journalist Michael Bamberger claimed that Cantlay had said, in reference to PGA of America executive Julius Mason, "I'll wear a hat when I'm paid to be here like he is." In 2024, the PGA of America announced that each United States player would receive a $200,000 stipend for participating in the Ryder Cup, beginning with the 2025 edition.

At the Genesis Invitational in February 2024, Cantlay held a two-stroke lead after 54 holes. He shot a 1-over 72 in the final round to finish tied-fourth. In June, at the 2024 U.S. Open held at Pinehurst No. 2, Cantlay shot a 5-under 65 to share the first-round lead alongside Rory McIlroy. He ultimately finished tied-third at 4-under 276. This tie for third equaled his best finish in a major championship. Cantlay qualified for the 2024 Presidents Cup in September. The United States won by a score of 18.5–11.5 and Cantlay had a 4–1–0 record, including a win in his singles match against Taylor Pendrith. This brought Cantlay's record to 15–6–1 in team events as a professional.

Cantlay was tied for the lead after 54 holes at the Tour Championship in August 2025, alongside Tommy Fleetwood. He shot a final-round 71 to finish tied-second, three strokes behind Fleetwood. This meant that Cantlay remained winless on tour since 2022. In September, he was selected as a captain's pick for the 2025 Ryder Cup. He went 1–3–1, including a loss in singles to Ludvig Åberg, as the United States lost by a score of 15–13.

=== 2026–present ===
In July 2026, Cantlay was co-leader after the first round of the Genesis Scottish Open. He shot a second-round 74 to miss the cut. Later that month, Cantlay held a share of the lead at the Rocket Classic after two rounds. He said in an interview following the second round that his 2026 season had been "pretty mediocre so far". He finished the tournament in a tie for eighth, which was his fourth top-10 of the year.

Cantlay finished solo-second at the BMW Championship in August 2026, three strokes behind Wyndham Clark. The runner-up finish vaulted Cantlay from 43rd to 19th in the FedEx Cup rankings, which moved him inside the top-30 cutoff to qualify for the Tour Championship.

== Personal life ==
In February 2016, while crossing a street in Newport Beach, California, Cantlay's caddie and friend Chris Roth was hit by a car whose driver then fled the scene. Cantlay was walking 10 feet behind Roth when the collision happened; he subsequently called 911 and held Roth in his arms until an ambulance arrived. Roth was transported to hospital, where he died of his injuries aged 24. 21-year-old Nancy Diana Flores was later arrested on suspicion of manslaughter and hit and run resulting in death. She pleaded guilty to felony hit and run and received a sentence of two years in prison. Cantlay stated in 2023 that he still has nightmares where he relives Roth's death, adding: "I remember it all. There's a sense of what could I have done? ... I'm not sure if you ever stop grieving. It's just a very slow, gradual acceptance."

Cantlay created the Patrick Cantlay Foundation in 2019, with a goal of supporting junior golf and first responders. It is designated as a 501(c)(3) organization. In 2025, Cantlay said that he planned to donate the stipend he received for participating in the Ryder Cup to the foundation.

In 2023, Cantlay married Nicole Guidish, a doctor of pharmacy, at the St. Regis in Rome, Italy. As of 2025, Cantlay lives in Jupiter, Florida, which is home to numerous golfers. He stated in a 2024 interview that he is interested in alternative investing, particularly real estate. He said he was working to "create a multifamily real estate business that I can step into later in life after my golf career ends."

== Professional wins (9) ==
=== PGA Tour wins (8) ===
Legend
FedEx Cup playoff events (3)
Other PGA Tour (5)

| No. | Date | Tournament | Winning score | Margin of victory | Runner(s)-up |
|---|---|---|---|---|---|
| 1 | Nov 5, 2017 | Shriners Hospitals for Children Open | −9 (67-71-70-67=275) | Playoff | (Germany) Alex Čejka, (South Korea) Kim Meen-whee |
| 2 | Jun 2, 2019 | Memorial Tournament | −19 (68-69-68-64=269) | 2 strokes | (Australia) Adam Scott |
| 3 | Oct 25, 2020 | Zozo Championship | −23 (67-65-68-65=265) | 1 stroke | (Spain) Jon Rahm, (United States) Justin Thomas |
| 4 | Jun 6, 2021 | Memorial Tournament (2) | −13 (69-67-68-71=275) | Playoff | (United States) Collin Morikawa |
| 5 | Aug 29, 2021 | BMW Championship | −27 (66-63-66-66=261) | Playoff | (United States) Bryson DeChambeau |
| 6 | Sep 5, 2021 | Tour Championship | −21^{1} (67-66-67-69=269) | 1 stroke | (Spain) Jon Rahm |
| 7 | Apr 24, 2022 | Zurich Classic of New Orleans (with (United States) Xander Schauffele) | −29 (59-68-60-72=259) | 2 strokes | (United States) Sam Burns and (United States) Billy Horschel |
| 8 | Aug 21, 2022 | BMW Championship (2) | −14 (68-68-65-69=270) | 1 stroke | (United States) Scott Stallings |

^{1}Started tournament at −10 FedEx Cup playoffs adjustment, scored −11 to par.

PGA Tour playoff record (3–4)

| No. | Year | Tournament | Opponent(s) | Result |
|---|---|---|---|---|
| 1 | 2017 | Shriners Hospitals for Children Open | (Germany) Alex Čejka, (South Korea) Kim Meen-whee | Won with par on second extra hole |
| 2 | 2019 | Shriners Hospitals for Children Open | (United States) Kevin Na | Lost to par on second extra hole |
| 3 | 2021 | Memorial Tournament | (United States) Collin Morikawa | Won with par on first extra hole |
| 4 | 2021 | BMW Championship | (United States) Bryson DeChambeau | Won with birdie on sixth extra hole |
| 5 | 2022 | WM Phoenix Open | (United States) Scottie Scheffler | Lost to birdie on third extra hole |
| 6 | 2022 | RBC Heritage | (United States) Jordan Spieth | Lost to par on first extra hole |
| 7 | 2023 | FedEx St. Jude Championship | (United States) Lucas Glover | Lost to par on first extra hole |

=== Web.com Tour wins (1) ===
| No. | Date | Tournament | Winning score | Margin of victory | Runner-up |
|---|---|---|---|---|---|
| 1 | Mar 3, 2013 | Colombia Championship | −18 (67-68-65-66=266) | 4 strokes | (United States) Jim Renner |

Web.com Tour playoff record (0–1)

| No. | Year | Tournament | Opponents | Result |
|---|---|---|---|---|
| 1 | 2012 | Chiquita Classic | (United States) Russell Henley, (United States) Morgan Hoffmann | Henley won with par on first extra hole |

== Results in major championships ==
Results not in chronological order in 2020.

| Tournament | 2011 | 2012 | 2013 | 2014 | 2015 | 2016 | 2017 | 2018 |
|---|---|---|---|---|---|---|---|---|
| Masters Tournament | | T47LA | | | | | | CUT |
| U.S. Open | T21LA | T41 | | | | | | T45 |
| The Open Championship | | | | | | | | T12 |
| PGA Championship | | | | | | | T33 | T27 |

| Tournament | 2019 | 2020 | 2021 | 2022 | 2023 | 2024 | 2025 | 2026 |
|---|---|---|---|---|---|---|---|---|
| Masters Tournament | T9 | T17 | CUT | T39 | T14 | T22 | T36 | T12 |
| PGA Championship | T3 | T43 | T23 | CUT | T9 | T53 | CUT | T35 |
| U.S. Open | T21 | T43 | T15 | T14 | T14 | T3 | CUT | CUT |
| The Open Championship | T41 | NT | CUT | T8 | T33 | T25 | CUT | T28 |

Top 10
Did not play

LA = low amateur
CUT = missed the half-way cut
"T" = tied for place
NT = no tournament due to COVID-19 pandemic

=== Summary ===
| Tournament | Wins | 2nd | 3rd | Top-5 | Top-10 | Top-25 | Events | Cuts made |
|---|---|---|---|---|---|---|---|---|
| Masters Tournament | 0 | 0 | 0 | 0 | 1 | 5 | 10 | 8 |
| PGA Championship | 0 | 0 | 1 | 1 | 2 | 3 | 10 | 8 |
| U.S. Open | 0 | 0 | 1 | 1 | 1 | 6 | 11 | 9 |
| The Open Championship | 0 | 0 | 0 | 0 | 1 | 3 | 8 | 6 |
| Totals | 0 | 0 | 2 | 2 | 5 | 17 | 39 | 31 |

- Most consecutive cuts made – 10 (2018 U.S. Open – 2020 Masters)
- Longest streak of top-10s – 2 (2019 Masters – 2019 PGA)

== Results in The Players Championship ==
| Tournament | 2017 | 2018 | 2019 | 2020 | 2021 | 2022 | 2023 | 2024 | 2025 | 2026 |
|---|---|---|---|---|---|---|---|---|---|---|
| The Players Championship | T22 | T23 | CUT | C | CUT | CUT | T19 | T68 | T12 | T32 |

CUT = missed the halfway cut
"T" indicates a tie for a place
C = Canceled after the first round due to the COVID-19 pandemic

== Results in World Golf Championships ==
| Tournament | 2017 | 2018 | 2019 | 2020 | 2021 | 2022 | 2023 |
|---|---|---|---|---|---|---|---|
| Championship | | T30 | T6 | | | | |
| Match Play | | T17 | T24 | NT^{1} | T18 | T26 | R16 |
| Invitational | | T6 | T12 | T35 | T23 | | |
| Champions | T15 | T7 | | NT^{1} | NT^{1} | NT^{1} | |

^{1}Cancelled due to COVID-19 pandemic

Top 10
Did not play

NT = No tournament
"T" = Tied
QF, R16, R32, R64 = Round in which player lost in match play
Note that the Championship and Invitational were discontinued from 2022. The Champions was discontinued from 2023.

== PGA Tour career summary ==
| Season | Starts | Cuts made | Wins | 2nd | 3rd | Top-10 | Top-25 | Best finish | Earnings ($) | Money list rank |
|---|---|---|---|---|---|---|---|---|---|---|
| 2011 | 5 | 5 | 0 | 0 | 0 | 1 | 4 | T9 | n/a^{[a]} | n/a |
| 2012 | 7 | 6 | 0 | 0 | 0 | 0 | 0 | T31 | 105,526 | n/a |
| 2013 | 7 | 2 | 0 | 0 | 0 | 1 | 1 | T9 | 195,411 | n/a |
| 2013–14 | 5 | 2 | 0 | 0 | 0 | 0 | 1 | T23 | 76,131 | 212 |
| 2014–15 | 1 | 1 | 0 | 0 | 0 | 0 | 0 | 76 | 11,468 | 249 |
| 2016–17 | 13 | 13 | 0 | 1 | 1 | 4 | 8 | 2 | 2,049,632 | 47 |
| 2017–18 | 23 | 21 | 1 | 0 | 0 | 7 | 15 | 1 | 3,963,962 | 20 |
| 2018–19 | 21 | 18 | 1 | 2 | 2 | 9 | 17 | 1 | 6,121,488 | 4 |
| 2019–20 | 12 | 11 | 0 | 1 | 0 | 3 | 7 | 2 | 2,118,336 | 36 |
| 2020–21* | 24 | 19 | 4 | 1 | 1 | 7 | 17 | 1 | 7,638,805 | 2 |
| Career* | 121 | 100 | 6 | 5 | 4 | 32 | 69 | 1 | 22,280,758 | 76 |

^{a} Cantlay was an amateur.

* As of September 8, 2021

== U.S. national team appearances ==
Amateur

- Palmer Cup: 2011 (winners)
- Walker Cup: 2011

Professional

- Presidents Cup: 2019 (winners), 2022 (winners), 2024 (winners), 2026 (winners)
- Ryder Cup: 2021 (winners), 2023, 2025

== See also ==
- 2013 Web.com Tour Finals graduates
