= Collin Morikawa =

American professional golfer (born 1997)

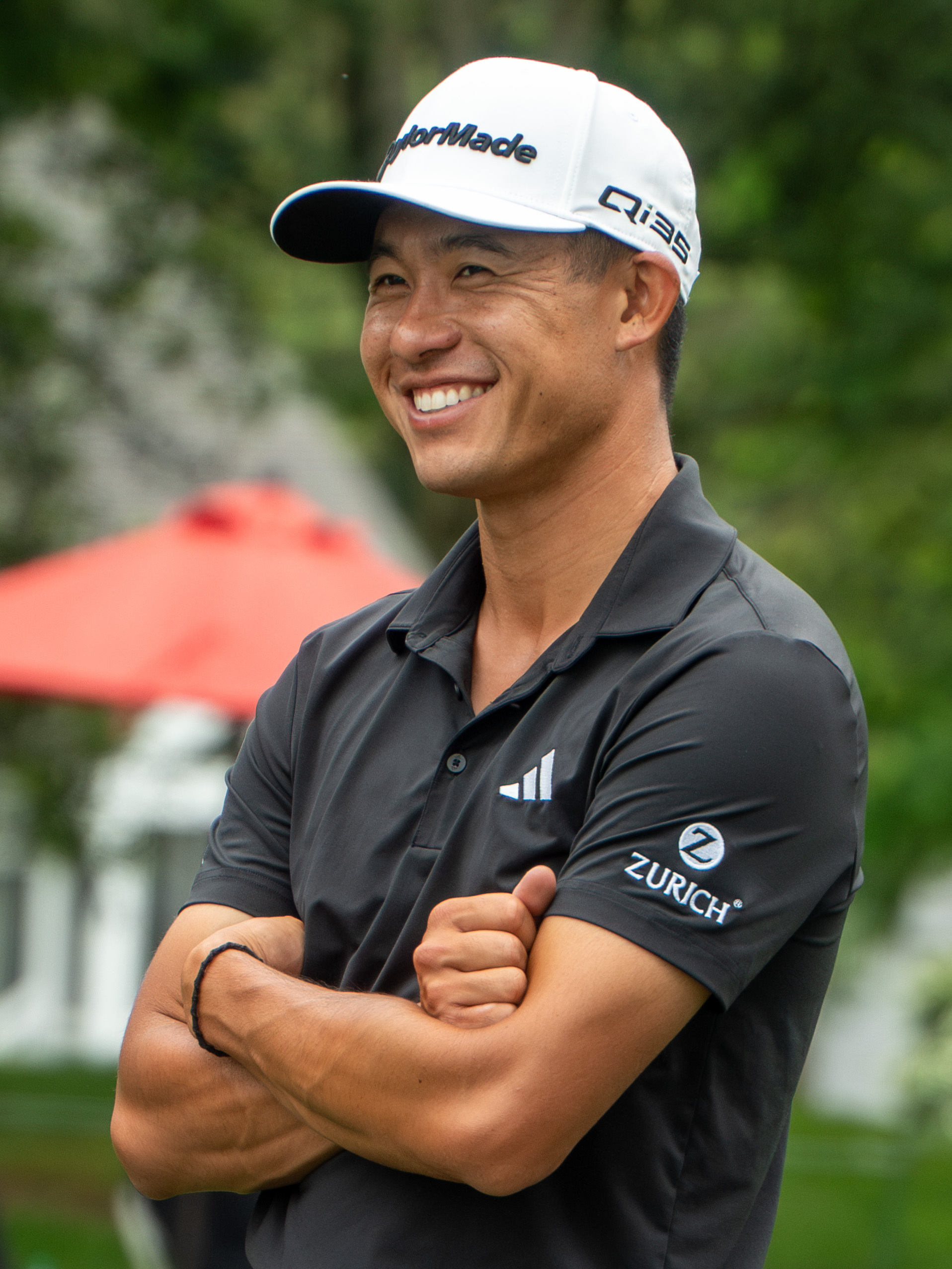
- Morikawa at the 2025 Travelers Championship

Personal information
- Nationality: United States
- Born: February 6, 1997 (age 29) Los Angeles, California, U.S.
- Height: 5 ft 9 in (175 cm)
- Weight: 160 lb (73 kg)
- Spouse: Katherine Zhu (m. 2022)

Career
- Sport: Golf
- College: University of California, Berkeley
- Turned professional: 2019
- Current tour: PGA Tour
- Former tour: European Tour
- Professional wins: 8
- Highest ranking: 2 (October 24, 2021) (as of October 25, 2026)

Number of wins by tour
- PGA Tour: 7
- European Tour: 4

Best results in major championships (wins: 2)
- Masters Tournament: T3: 2024
- PGA Championship: Won: 2020
- U.S. Open: T4: 2021
- The Open Championship: Won: 2021

Achievements and awards
- European Tour Race to Dubai winner: 2021

Collin Morikawa (born February 6, 1997) is an American professional golfer who plays on the PGA Tour. He began his PGA Tour career with 22 consecutive made cuts, second only to Tiger Woods' 25-cut streak. Morikawa has seven PGA Tour wins – including two major championships, the 2020 PGA Championship and the 2021 Open Championship, winning both in his debut. In May 2018, Morikawa spent three weeks as the top-ranked golfer in the World Amateur Golf Ranking. He also became the first American to win the Race to Dubai on the European Tour.

== Amateur career ==
Morikawa played collegiate golf at the University of California, Berkeley, from 2015 to 2019, winning five times, including the 2019 Pac-12 Conference Championship. Aside from his collegiate wins, he won the Western Junior, Trans-Mississippi Amateur, Sunnehanna Amateur and the Northeast Amateur. He played on the winning Arnold Palmer Cup team in 2017 and 2018, the winning Walker Cup team in 2017 and the Eisenhower Trophy team in 2018 that finished second by one stroke. In May 2018, he spent three weeks as the top-ranked golfer in the World Amateur Golf Ranking.

== Professional career ==
=== 2019 ===
Morikawa made his debut as a professional at the 2019 RBC Canadian Open, where he tied for 14th place. On July 7, Morikawa tied for second at the 3M Open. On July 14, he tied for 4th at John Deere Classic. With that finish, Morikawa secured PGA Tour membership for the 2019–20 season. Morikawa then won his first PGA Tour event two weeks later, at the Barracuda Championship – beating Troy Merritt by three points.

=== 2020 ===
On June 14, Morikawa tied for the lead of the 2020 Charles Schwab Challenge after 72 holes. This was the first PGA Tour tournament played after a three-month hiatus due to the COVID-19 pandemic. Morikawa missed a short par putt on the first playoff hole to lose to Daniel Berger.

On June 26, Morikawa missed his first cut on the PGA Tour at the Travelers Championship, ending a streak of 22 consecutive made cuts, the second-longest streak to start a professional career to the 25 made by Tiger Woods.

On July 12, Morikawa beat Justin Thomas in a playoff to win his second PGA Tour title at the Workday Charity Open. The win was the first non-alternate PGA Tour victory for him. Morikawa rallied from a three-shot deficit with three holes remaining, and made a 25-foot birdie putt on the first playoff hole to stay alive, before winning with a par on the third playoff hole.

On August 9, Morikawa won the 2020 PGA Championship to win a major in only his second major championship start. His final round of 64 tied the lowest final round score shot by a PGA Champion, matching Steve Elkington in the 1995 PGA Championship. With his win, Morikawa was the third youngest golfer to win the PGA Championship when he won the event at age 23. Morikawa was also the fourth golfer to win the PGA Championship before turning 24 years old.

=== 2021 ===
On February 28, Morikawa won the 2021 WGC-Workday Championship at the Concession Golf Club in Bradenton, Florida. Morikawa won by three strokes over Billy Horschel, Viktor Hovland and Brooks Koepka.

On July 18, Morikawa won the 2021 Open Championship at Royal St George's Golf Club in Kent, England. Morikawa won by two strokes over Jordan Spieth. He became the first player since Bobby Jones in 1926 to win two majors in eight or fewer starts. He also became the first player to win two different majors in his debut appearance.

In August, Morikawa finished in a tie for 3rd place at the Olympic Games. He lost in a 7-man playoff for the bronze medal.

In September, Morikawa played on the U.S. team in the 2021 Ryder Cup at Whistling Straits in Kohler, Wisconsin. The U.S. team won 19–9 and Morikawa went 3–0–1 including a tie in his Sunday singles match against Viktor Hovland.

In November, he won the European Tour's season ending DP World Tour Championship, Dubai. He also became the first American to win the Race to Dubai.

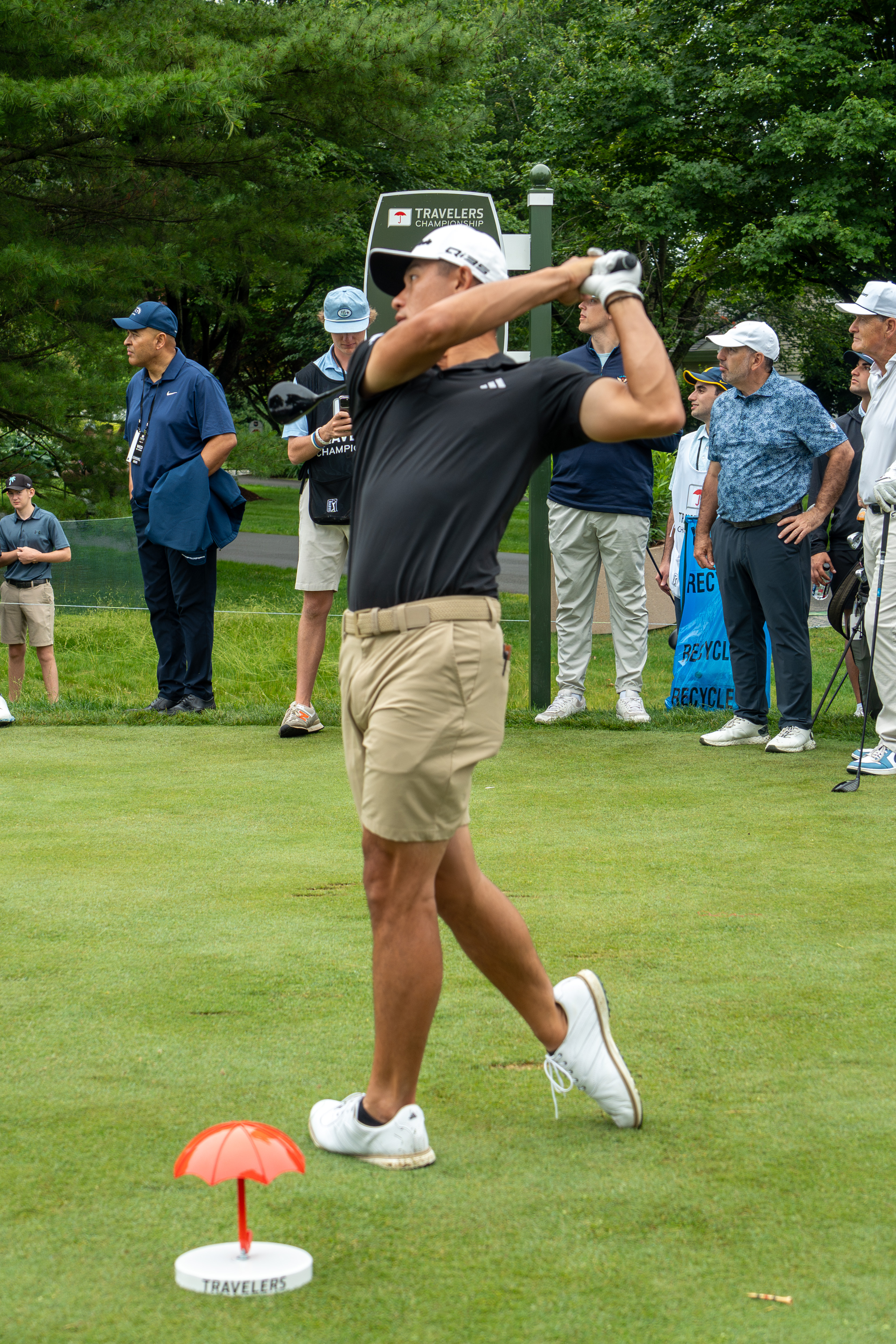
Collin Morikawa at the 2025 Travelers Championship

=== 2022 ===
In February, Morikawa shot a final-round 65 at the Genesis Invitational to finish tied-second; two shots behind Joaquín Niemann.

=== 2023 ===
At the Sentry Tournament of Champions in January, Morikawa held a six shot lead after 54 holes. He played the first 67 holes of the tournament without a bogey, but then made three consecutively and ultimately finished second; two strokes behind Jon Rahm. This tied Morikawa for the PGA Tour record for largest 54-hole lead squandered.

In February, he finished solo third at the Farmers Insurance Open, three shots behind Max Homa.

In July, Morikawa tied for the lead at the Rocket Mortgage Classic after 72 holes, shooting a bogey-free 8-under 64. He lost to a birdie from Rickie Fowler on the first playoff hole, finishing tied-second with Adam Hadwin.

In October, Morikawa won the Zozo Championship, ending a 27-month winless drought on the PGA Tour.

=== 2026 ===
In February 2026, Morikawa won the AT&T Pebble Beach Pro-Am by one stroke over Min Woo Lee and Sepp Straka, ending a 28-month winless streak.

== Personal life ==
The son of Debbie and Blaine Morikawa, Morikawa was born in Los Angeles, California, and is of Chinese-Japanese descent. He graduated from La Cañada High School in La Cañada Flintridge, California, in Los Angeles County. Morikawa graduated from the University of California, Berkeley in 2019 with a degree in business administration.

In December 2021, Morikawa got engaged to his long-time girlfriend, Katherine Zhu. They were married on November 26, 2022.

== Amateur wins ==
- 2013 Western Junior
- 2015 Trans-Mississippi Amateur
- 2016 Silicon Valley Amateur, Sunnehanna Amateur
- 2017 ASU Thunderbird Invitational, Northeast Amateur
- 2018 Wyoming Desert Intercollegiate, Querencia Cabo Collegiate, Annual Western Intercollegiate
- 2019 The Farms Invitational, Pac-12 Championship

== Professional wins (8) ==
=== PGA Tour wins (7) ===
Legend
Major championships (2)
World Golf Championships (1)
Signature events (1)
Other PGA Tour (3)

| No. | Date | Tournament | Winning score | To par | Margin of victory | Runner(s)-up |
|---|---|---|---|---|---|---|
| 1 | Jul 28, 2019 | Barracuda Championship | 47 pts (13-7-13-14=47) | | 3 points | (United States) Troy Merritt |
| 2 | Jul 12, 2020 | Workday Charity Open | 65-66-72-66=269 | −19 | Playoff | (United States) Justin Thomas |
| 3 | Aug 9, 2020 | PGA Championship | 69-69-65-64=267 | −13 | 2 strokes | (England) Paul Casey, (United States) Dustin Johnson |
| 4 | Feb 28, 2021 | WGC-Workday Championship | 70-64-67-69=270 | −18 | 3 strokes | (United States) Billy Horschel, (Norway) Viktor Hovland, (United States) Brooks Koepka |
| 5 | Jul 18, 2021 | The Open Championship | 67-64-68-66=265 | −15 | 2 strokes | (United States) Jordan Spieth |
| 6 | Oct 22, 2023 | Zozo Championship^{1} | 64-73-66-63=266 | −14 | 6 strokes | (United States) Eric Cole, (United States) Beau Hossler |
| 7 | Feb 15, 2026 | AT&T Pebble Beach Pro-Am | 69-68-62-67=266 | −22 | 1 stroke | (Australia) Min Woo Lee, (Austria) Sepp Straka |

^{1}Co-sanctioned by the Japan Golf Tour, but unofficial event on that tour.

PGA Tour playoff record (1–3)

| No. | Year | Tournament | Opponent(s) | Result |
|---|---|---|---|---|
| 1 | 2020 | Charles Schwab Challenge | (United States) Daniel Berger | Lost to par on first extra hole |
| 2 | 2020 | Workday Charity Open | (United States) Justin Thomas | Won with par on third extra hole |
| 3 | 2021 | Memorial Tournament | (United States) Patrick Cantlay | Lost to par on first extra hole |
| 4 | 2023 | Rocket Mortgage Classic | (United States) Rickie Fowler, (Canada) Adam Hadwin | Fowler won with birdie on first extra hole |

=== European Tour wins (4) ===
Legend
Major championships (2)
World Golf Championships (1)
Tour Championships (1)
Rolex Series (1) (Note: The DP World Tour Championship, Dubai is also a Rolex Series tournament.)
Other European Tour (0)

| No. | Date | Tournament | Winning score | To par | Margin of victory | Runner(s)-up |
|---|---|---|---|---|---|---|
| 1 | Aug 9, 2020 | PGA Championship | 69-69-65-64=267 | −13 | 2 strokes | (England) Paul Casey, (United States) Dustin Johnson |
| 2 | Feb 28, 2021 | WGC-Workday Championship | 70-64-67-69=270 | −18 | 3 strokes | (United States) Billy Horschel, (Norway) Viktor Hovland, (United States) Brooks Koepka |
| 3 | Jul 18, 2021 | The Open Championship | 67-64-68-66=265 | −15 | 2 strokes | (United States) Jordan Spieth |
| 4 | Nov 21, 2021 | DP World Tour Championship, Dubai | 68-68-69-66=271 | −17 | 3 strokes | (Sweden) Alexander Björk, (England) Matt Fitzpatrick |

== Playoff record ==
Web.com Tour playoff record (0–1)

| No. | Year | Tournament | Opponents | Result |
|---|---|---|---|---|
| 1 | 2016 | Air Capital Classic (as an amateur) | (United States) Ollie Schniederjans, (United States) J. J. Spaun | Schniederjans won with birdie on second extra hole |

== Major championships ==
=== Wins (2) ===
| Year | Championship | 54 holes | Winning score | Margin | Runner(s)-up |
|---|---|---|---|---|---|
| 2020 | PGA Championship | 2 shot deficit | −13 (69-69-65-64=267) | 2 strokes | (England) Paul Casey, (United States) Dustin Johnson |
| 2021 | The Open Championship | 1 shot deficit | −15 (67-64-68-66=265) | 2 strokes | (United States) Jordan Spieth |

=== Results timeline ===
Results not in chronological order in 2020.

| Tournament | 2019 | 2020 | 2021 | 2022 | 2023 | 2024 | 2025 | 2026 |
|---|---|---|---|---|---|---|---|---|
| Masters Tournament | | T44 | T18 | 5 | T10 | T3 | T14 | T7 |
| PGA Championship | | 1 | T8 | T55 | T26 | T4 | T50 | T55 |
| U.S. Open | T35 | CUT | T4 | T5 | T14 | T14 | T23 | T17 |
| The Open Championship | | NT | 1 | CUT | CUT | T16 | CUT | T18 |

Win
Top 10
Did not play

CUT = missed the half-way cut
"T" = tied
NT = no tournament due to COVID-19 pandemic

=== Summary ===
| Tournament | Wins | 2nd | 3rd | Top-5 | Top-10 | Top-25 | Events | Cuts made |
|---|---|---|---|---|---|---|---|---|
| Masters Tournament | 0 | 0 | 1 | 2 | 4 | 6 | 7 | 7 |
| PGA Championship | 1 | 0 | 0 | 2 | 3 | 3 | 7 | 7 |
| U.S. Open | 0 | 0 | 0 | 2 | 2 | 6 | 8 | 7 |
| The Open Championship | 1 | 0 | 0 | 1 | 1 | 3 | 6 | 3 |
| Totals | 2 | 0 | 1 | 7 | 10 | 18 | 28 | 24 |

- Most consecutive cuts made – 8 (2020 Masters – 2022 U.S. Open)
- Longest streak of top-10s – 4 (2021 PGA – 2022 Masters)

== Results in The Players Championship ==
| Tournament | 2021 | 2022 | 2023 | 2024 | 2025 | 2026 |
|---|---|---|---|---|---|---|
| The Players Championship | T41 | CUT | T13 | T45 | T10 | WD |

Top 10

CUT = missed the halfway cut
WD = withdrew
"T" indicates a tie for a place

== World Golf Championships ==
=== Wins (1) ===
| Year | Championship | 54 holes | Winning score | Margin | Runners-up |
|---|---|---|---|---|---|
| 2021 | WGC-Workday Championship | 2 shot lead | −18 (70-64-67-69=270) | 3 strokes | (United States) Billy Horschel, (Norway) Viktor Hovland, (United States) Brooks Koepka |

=== Results timeline ===
| Tournament | 2020 | 2021 | 2022 | 2023 |
|---|---|---|---|---|
| Championship | T42 | 1 | | |
| Match Play | NT^{1} | T56 | R16 | T28 |
| Invitational | T20 | T26 | | |
| Champions | NT^{1} | NT^{1} | NT^{1} | |

^{1}Canceled due to COVID-19 pandemic

Win
Top 10
Did not play

QF, R16, R32, R64 = Round in which player lost in match play
NT = No tournament
"T" = Tied
Note that the Championship and Invitational were discontinued from 2022. The Champions was discontinued from 2023.

== U.S. national team appearances ==
Amateur

- Arnold Palmer Cup: 2017 (winners), 2018 (winners)
- Walker Cup: 2017 (winners)
- Eisenhower Trophy: 2018

Professional

- Ryder Cup: 2021 (winners), 2023, 2025
- Presidents Cup: 2022 (winners), 2024 (winners), 2026 (winners)
