= Memorial Tournament =

Golf tournament held in Columbus, Ohio, United States

Coordinates: 40.1404°N 83.1414°W

Tournament information
- Location: Dublin, Ohio
- Established: 1976; 50 years ago
- Course: Muirfield Village Golf Club
- Par: 72
- Length: 7,392 yards (6,759 m)
- Tour: PGA Tour
- Format: Stroke play
- Prize fund: US$20,000,000
- Month played: June
- Website: thememorialtournament.com

Tournament record score
- Aggregate: 268 Tom Lehman (1994)
- To par: −20 as above

Current champion
- (United States) J. T. Poston

Location map
- Location in the United States Location in Ohio

The Memorial Tournament (branded as the Memorial Tournament presented by Workday for sponsorship reasons, and also referred to as simply the Memorial) is a PGA Tour golf tournament founded in 1976 by Jack Nicklaus and originally played on Memorial Day weekend. It is played on a Nicklaus-designed course at Muirfield Village Golf Club in Dublin, Ohio, a suburb north of Columbus. The golf course passes through a large neighborhood called Muirfield Village, which includes a 1999 bronze sculpture of Nicklaus mentoring a young golfer located in the wide median of Muirfield Drive.

== History ==
The greater Columbus area is where Jack Nicklaus spent most of his early life. The golf course he designed at Muirfield Village, north of Columbus, was opened in May 1974, and two years later it hosted the first Memorial Tournament. The par-72 course was 7,072 yards (6,467 m), a considerable length for the mid-1970s.

At the Masters Tournament in 1966, Nicklaus had spoken of his desire to create a tournament that, like The Masters, had a global interest, and was inspired by the history and traditions of the game of golf. He also wanted the tournament to give back in the form of charitable contributions to organizations benefiting needy adults and children throughout Columbus and Ohio. The primary charitable beneficiary of the tournament is Nationwide Children's Hospital.

One of the features of the tournament is a yearly induction ceremony honoring past golfers. A plaque for each honoree is installed near the clubhouse at Muirfield; Nicklaus himself was the 2000 honoree, and his wife Barbara was honored in 2025.

== Invitational status ==
The Memorial Tournament is one of only five tournaments given "invitational" status by the PGA Tour, and consequently it has a reduced field of only 73 players in 2024 (as opposed to most full-field open tournaments with a field of 156 players). The other four tournaments with invitational status are the Arnold Palmer Invitational, the RBC Heritage, Charles Schwab Challenge, and the Genesis Invitational. Invitational tournaments have smaller fields (between 69 and 132 players), and have more freedom than full-field open tournaments in determining which players are eligible to participate in their event, as invitational tournaments are not required to fill their fields using the PGA Tour Priority Ranking System. Furthermore, unlike full-field open tournaments, invitational tournaments do not offer open qualifying (aka Monday qualifying).

In June 2014, the PGA Tour approved a resolution to grant the winner a three-year exemption, one more than other regular Tour events and on par with winners of the World Golf Championships, The Tour Championship and the Arnold Palmer Invitational.

== Field ==
For the 2026 season, eligible PGA Tour members who can participate in this 72-player event include:

1. Top 50 players from the previous year's FedExCup Playoffs & Eligibility Points List through the Playoffs
2. Top 10 available players from the current year's FedExCup Playoffs and Eligibility Points List through the Charles Schwab Challenge
3. Top 5 available players who accumulate the most FedExCup points in the "swing" of full-field events prior to this event
4. Tournament winners in the current season
5. PGA Tour members in the Top 30 of the Official World Golf Ranking as of the Monday before the tournament
6. 4 sponsor exemptions restricted to PGA Tour members
7. The Division 1 College Player of the Year from 2025 (the Jack Nicklaus Award)
8. One exemption for exceptional lifetime achievement of 80+ career wins
9. Remaining positions filled by players below the top 10 available players from the current year's FedExCup Playoffs & Eligibility Points List through the Charles Schwab Challenge

== Tournament highlights ==
- 1976: Roger Maltbie won the inaugural Memorial Tournament, defeating Hale Irwin in a four-hole aggregate playoff. On the third extra hole Maltbie's errant approach shot appeared headed for the gallery when it hit a post, causing the ball to bounce onto the green, where both parred to remain tied; Maltbie then birdied the 18th hole to win the playoff.
- 1977: Poor weather resulted in a Monday finish for the tournament; host Jack Nicklaus won by two shots over Hubert Green.
- 1980: David Graham birdied the 72nd hole to edge Tom Watson by one shot; Watson was bidding to become the first Memorial champion to defend his title.
- 1984: Jack Nicklaus defeated Andy Bean in a sudden-death playoff to become the first two-time Memorial winner.
- 1991: Kenny Perry won for the first time on the PGA Tour, defeating Irwin on the first hole of a sudden-death playoff.
- 1993: Paul Azinger birdied the 72nd hole by holing out from a bunker to finish one shot ahead of Corey Pavin.
- 1994: Tom Lehman shot a tournament record 268 (-20) for 72 holes on his way to a five-shot victory over Greg Norman.
- 2000: Tiger Woods became the first Memorial winner to successfully defend his title, finishing five shots clear of Ernie Els.
- 2001: Woods won for a third consecutive year, seven shots ahead of runners-up Paul Azinger and Sergio García.
- 2005: Bart Bryant saved par from a hazard on the 72nd hole to win by one shot over Fred Couples.
- 2007: K. J. Choi shot a final round 65 to win by one shot over Ryan Moore.
- 2012: Woods birdied three of the last four holes, including a chip in on the 16th hole, to turn a two-shot deficit into a two-shot victory. The win was Woods' 73rd PGA Tour victory, which tied Jack Nicklaus for second most PGA Tour wins.
- 2013: Defending champion Woods posted a third round back nine score of 44, the worst in his career. He finished 20 shots behind winner Matt Kuchar.
- 2014: Hideki Matsuyama won in a playoff against Kevin Na; he was the first Japanese PGA Tour winner since 2008.
- 2015: In the third round, Tiger Woods shot an 85, the worst round of his professional career. Three-time winner Kenny Perry played his last PGA Tour event.
- 2016: William McGirt won for the first time on the PGA Tour after 165 starts.
- 2020: Jon Rahm's win elevated him to the world number one ranking for the first time in his career.
- 2021: Defending champion Rahm held a six-stroke lead after 54 holes, but was forced to withdraw after testing positive for COVID-19.
- 2024: Scottie Scheffler wins the Memorial, becoming the first since Tom Watson in 1980 to win five PGA Tour events in a season prior to the U.S. Open.

== Course layout ==
Muirfield Village Golf Club in 2016

Hole	1	2	3	4	5	6	7	8	9	Out	10	11	12	13	14	15	16	17	18	In	Total
Yards	470	455	401	200	527	447	563	185	412	3,660	471	567	184	455	363	529	201	478	484	3,732	7,392
Par	4	4	4	3	5	4	5	3	4	36	4	5	3	4	4	5	3	4	4	36	72

== Winners and honorees ==
Year	Winner	Score	To par	Margin of victory	Runner(s)-up	Winner's share ($)	Honoree(s)
2026	(United States) J. T. Poston	276	−12	Playoff	(United States) Ryan Gerard	4,000,000	David Graham
2025	(United States) Scottie Scheffler (2)	278	−10	4 strokes	(United States) Ben Griffin	4,000,000	Barbara Nicklaus
2024	(United States) Scottie Scheffler	280	−8	1 stroke	(United States) Collin Morikawa	4,000,000	Juli Inkster; Tom Weiskopf (Note: Posthumously honored)
2023	(Norway) Viktor Hovland	281	−7	Playoff	(United States) Denny McCarthy	3,600,000	Larry Nelson
2022	(United States) Billy Horschel	275	−13	4 strokes	(United States) Aaron Wise	2,160,000	Charlie Sifford
2021	(United States) Patrick Cantlay (2)	275	−13	Playoff	(United States) Collin Morikawa	1,674,000	Nick Price; Gene Littler; Ted Ray
2020	(Spain) Jon Rahm	279	−9	3 strokes	(United States) Ryan Palmer	1,674,000	Nick Price; Gene Littler; Ted Ray
2019	(United States) Patrick Cantlay	269	−19	2 strokes	(Australia) Adam Scott	1,638,000	Judy Rankin
2018	(United States) Bryson DeChambeau	273	−15	Playoff	(South Korea) An Byeong-hun (United States) Kyle Stanley	1,602,000	Hale Irwin; Jock Hutchison; Willie Turnesa
2017	(United States) Jason Dufner	275	−13	3 strokes	(United States) Rickie Fowler (India) Anirban Lahiri	1,566,000	Greg Norman; Tony Lema; Ken Venturi; Harvie Ward
2016	(United States) William McGirt	273	−15	Playoff	(United States) Jon Curran	1,530,000	Johnny Miller; Leo Diegel; Horton Smith
2015	(Sweden) David Lingmerth	273	−15	Playoff	(England) Justin Rose	1,116,000	Nick Faldo; Dorothy Campbell; Jerome Travers; Walter Travis
2014	(Japan) Hideki Matsuyama	275	−13	Playoff	(United States) Kevin Na	1,116,000	Annika Sörenstam; Jim Barnes; Joe Carr; Willie Park Sr.
2013	(United States) Matt Kuchar	276	−12	2 strokes	(United States) Kevin Chappell	1,116,000	Raymond Floyd
2012	(United States) Tiger Woods (5)	279	−9	2 strokes	(Argentina) Andrés Romero (South Africa) Rory Sabbatini	1,116,000	Tom Watson
2011	(United States) Steve Stricker	272	−16	1 stroke	(United States) Brandt Jobe (United States) Matt Kuchar	1,116,000	Nancy Lopez
2010	(England) Justin Rose	270	−18	3 strokes	(United States) Rickie Fowler	1,080,000	Seve Ballesteros
2009	(United States) Tiger Woods (4)	276	−12	1 stroke	(United States) Jim Furyk	1,080,000	JoAnne Carner; Jack Burke Jr.
2008	(United States) Kenny Perry (3)	280	−8	2 strokes	(Australia) Mathew Goggin (United States) Jerry Kelly (England) Justin Rose (Canada) Mike Weir	1,080,000	Tony Jacklin; Ralph Guldahl; Charles B. Macdonald; Craig Wood
2007	(South Korea) K. J. Choi	271	−17	1 stroke	(United States) Ryan Moore	1,080,000	Louise Suggs; Dow Finsterwald
2006	(Sweden) Carl Pettersson	276	−12	2 strokes	(United States) Zach Johnson (United States) Brett Wetterich	1,035,000	Michael Bonallack; Charles Coe; Lawson Little; Henry Picard; Paul Runyan; Denny Shute
2005	(United States) Bart Bryant	272	−16	1 stroke	(United States) Fred Couples	990,000	Betsy Rawls; Cary Middlecoff
2004	(South Africa) Ernie Els	270	−18	4 strokes	(United States) Fred Couples	945,000	Lee Trevino; Joyce Wethered
2003	(United States) Kenny Perry (2)	275	−13	2 strokes	(United States) Lee Janzen	900,000	Julius Boros; William C. Campbell
2002	(United States) Jim Furyk	274	−14	2 strokes	(United States) John Cook (United States) David Peoples	810,000	Kathy Whitworth; Bobby Locke
2001	(United States) Tiger Woods (3)	271	−17	7 strokes	(United States) Paul Azinger (Spain) Sergio García	738,000	Payne Stewart
2000	(United States) Tiger Woods (2)	269	−19	5 strokes	(South Africa) Ernie Els (United States) Justin Leonard	558,000	Jack Nicklaus
1999	(United States) Tiger Woods	273	−15	2 strokes	(Fiji) Vijay Singh	459,000	Ben Hogan
1998	(United States) Fred Couples	271	−17	4 strokes	(United States) Andrew Magee	396,000	Peter Thomson
1997	(Fiji) Vijay Singh	202 (Note: Shortened to 54 holes due to rain.)	−14	2 strokes	(United States) Jim Furyk (Australia) Greg Norman	342,000	Gary Player
1996	(United States) Tom Watson (2)	274	−14	2 strokes	(United States) David Duval	324,000	Billy Casper
1995	(Australia) Greg Norman (2)	269	−19	4 strokes	(United States) Mark Calcavecchia (United States) David Duval (Australia) Steve Elkington	306,000	Willie Anderson; John Ball; James Braid; Harold Hilton; John Henry Taylor
1994	(United States) Tom Lehman	268	−20	5 strokes	(Australia) Greg Norman	270,000	Mickey Wright
1993	(United States) Paul Azinger	274	−14	1 stroke	(United States) Corey Pavin	252,000	Arnold Palmer
1992	(United States) David Edwards	273	−15	Playoff	(United States) Rick Fehr	234,000	Joseph Dey
1991	(United States) Kenny Perry	273	−15	Playoff	(United States) Hale Irwin	216,000	Babe Zaharias
1990	(Australia) Greg Norman	216	E	1 stroke	(United States) Payne Stewart	180,000	Jimmy Demaret
1989	(United States) Bob Tway	277	−11	2 strokes	(United States) Fuzzy Zoeller	160,000	Henry Cotton
1988	(United States) Curtis Strange	274	−14	2 strokes	(South Africa) David Frost (United States) Hale Irwin	160,000	Patty Berg
1987	(United States) Don Pooley	272	−16	3 strokes	(United States) Curt Byrum	140,000	Old Tom Morris; Young Tom Morris
1986	(United States) Hal Sutton	271	−17	4 strokes	(United States) Don Pooley	100,000	Roberto De Vicenzo
1985	(United States) Hale Irwin (2)	281	−7	1 stroke	(United States) Lanny Wadkins	100,000	Chick Evans
1984	(United States) Jack Nicklaus (2)	280	−8	Playoff	(United States) Andy Bean	90,000	Sam Snead
1983	(United States) Hale Irwin	281	−7	1 stroke	(United States) Ben Crenshaw (Australia) David Graham	72,000	Tommy Armour
1982	(United States) Raymond Floyd	281	−7	2 strokes	(United States) Peter Jacobsen (United States) Wayne Levi (United States) Roger Maltbie (United States) Gil Morgan	63,000	Glenna Collett-Vare
1981	(United States) Keith Fergus	284	−4	1 stroke	(United States) Jack Renner	63,000	Harry Vardon
1980	(Australia) David Graham	280	−8	1 stroke	(United States) Tom Watson	54,000	Byron Nelson
1979	(United States) Tom Watson	285	−3	3 strokes	(United States) Miller Barber	54,000	Gene Sarazen
1978	(United States) Jim Simons	284	−4	1 stroke	(United States) Billy Kratzert	50,000	Francis Ouimet
1977	(United States) Jack Nicklaus	281	−7	2 strokes	(United States) Hubert Green	45,000	Walter Hagen
1976	(United States) Roger Maltbie	288	E	Playoff	(United States) Hale Irwin	40,000	Bobby Jones

Note: Green highlight indicates scoring records.

== Multiple winners ==
Eight men have won the Memorial Tournament more than once through 2025:

- 5 wins: Tiger Woods (1999, 2000, 2001, 2009, 2012)
- 3 wins: Kenny Perry (1991, 2003, 2008)
- 2 wins: Jack Nicklaus (1977, 1984), Hale Irwin (1983, 1985), Greg Norman (1990, 1995), Tom Watson: (1979, 1996), Patrick Cantlay (2019, 2021), Scottie Scheffler (2024, 2025)

== See also ==
- Jack Nicklaus Museum on the campus of Ohio State University
