= 2024 Masters Tournament =

Major golf championship

- Front cover of the 2024 Masters Journal

Tournament information
- Dates: April 11–14, 2024
- Location: Augusta, Georgia, U.S. 33°30′09″N 82°01′12″W
- Course: Augusta National Golf Club
- Tours: PGA Tour; European Tour; Japan Golf Tour

Statistics
- Par: 72
- Length: 7,555 yards (6,908 m)
- Field: 89 players, 60 after cut
- Cut: 150 (+6)
- Prize fund: US$20,000,000
- Winner's share: $3,600,000

Champion
- (United States) Scottie Scheffler
- 277 (−11)
- Location in the United States Location in Georgia

The 2024 Masters Tournament was the 88th edition of the Masters Tournament and the first of the men's four major golf championships held in 2024. The tournament was played from April 11–14 at Augusta National Golf Club in Augusta, Georgia, United States. Scottie Scheffler won his second Masters and major, four strokes ahead of runner-up Ludvig Åberg, who was playing in his first major. Scheffler became the fourth-youngest two-time winner of the tournament and the second player, after Tiger Woods in 2001, to win both the Masters and The Players Championship in the same calendar year.

== Course ==
The only change to the course for the 2024 tournament was the lengthening of the second hole by ten yards.

Hole	Name	Yards	Par	Hole	Name	Yards	Par
1	Tea Olive	445	4	10	Camellia	495	4
2	Pink Dogwood	585	5	11	White Dogwood	520	4
3	Flowering Peach	350	4	12	Golden Bell	155	3
4	Flowering Crab Apple	240	3	13	Azalea	545	5
5	Magnolia	495	4	14	Chinese Fir	440	4
6	Juniper	180	3	15	Firethorn	550	5
7	Pampas	450	4	16	Redbud	170	3
8	Yellow Jasmine	570	5	17	Nandina	440	4
9	Carolina Cherry	460	4	18	Holly	465	4
Out		3,775	36	In		3,780	36
Source:				Total		7,555	72

== Field ==
Participation in the Masters Tournament is by invitation only, and the tournament has the smallest field of the major championships. There are a number of criteria by which invitations are awarded, including all past winners, recent major champions, leading finishers in the previous year's majors, leading players on the PGA Tour in the previous season, winners of full-point tournaments on the PGA Tour during the previous 12 months, leading players in the Official World Golf Ranking, and some leading amateurs.

=== Criteria ===
There were three changes to invitee criteria between the 2023 and 2024 tournaments. The first was to add the current NCAA Division I Men's Individual Champion a spot in the field, provided that he remains an amateur at the time of the tournament. In addition, Augusta National clarified that players who qualify for the Tour Championship must remain eligible to play in that event in order to qualify for the Masters. Also, with the PGA Tour returning to a calendar-year season schedule, Augusta National noted that winners of fall PGA Tour events would continue to qualify for the Masters.

The below list details the qualification criteria for the 2024 Masters Tournament and the players who have qualified under them; any additional criteria under which players qualified are indicated in parentheses.

1. All past winners of the Masters Tournament

- Fred Couples
- Sergio García
- Dustin Johnson
- Zach Johnson
- Hideki Matsuyama (17,19,20)
- Phil Mickelson (4,13)
- José María Olazábal
- Jon Rahm (2,13,15,18,19,20)
- Patrick Reed (13)
- Scottie Scheffler (5,13,14,16,17,18,19,20)
- Charl Schwartzel
- Adam Scott (19)
- Vijay Singh
- Jordan Spieth (13,18,19,20)
- Bubba Watson
- Mike Weir
- Danny Willett
- Tiger Woods
- Past winners who did not play: Tommy Aaron, Ángel Cabrera, (Note: Cabrera expressed his desire to play in the 2024 Masters, but his application for a visa to enter the United States was declined due to his criminal convictions in Argentina.) Charles Coody, Ben Crenshaw, Nick Faldo, Raymond Floyd, Trevor Immelman, Bernhard Langer, (Note: Langer intended the 2024 Masters to be his last as a player but suffered a torn Achilles tendon in February while playing pickleball.) Sandy Lyle, Larry Mize, Jack Nicklaus, Mark O'Meara, Gary Player, Craig Stadler, Tom Watson, Ian Woosnam, Fuzzy Zoeller

2. Recent winners of the U.S. Open (2019–2023)

- Wyndham Clark (14,17,18,19,20)
- Bryson DeChambeau (16)
- Matt Fitzpatrick (13,17,18,19,20)
- Gary Woodland

3. Recent winners of The Open Championship (2019–2023)

- Brian Harman (15,18,19,20)
- Shane Lowry (19,20)
- Collin Morikawa (4,13,17,18,19,20)
- Cameron Smith (5,14,19)

4. Recent winners of the PGA Championship (2019–2023)

- Brooks Koepka (13,16,19,20)
- Justin Thomas (19,20)

5. Recent winners of The Players Championship (2022–2024)

6. The winner of the gold medal at the Olympic Games (Note: Players qualifying under this category are only eligible for the first Masters Tournament following the Olympic Games.)

7. The winner and runner-up in the 2023 U.S. Amateur

- Nick Dunlap forfeited his invitation for winning the U.S. Amateur by turning professional, but qualified under category 17 by winning the 2024 American Express.
- Neal Shipley (a)

8. The winner of the 2023 Amateur Championship

- Christo Lamprecht (a)

9. The winner of the 2023 Asia-Pacific Amateur Championship

- Jasper Stubbs (a)

10. The winner of the 2024 Latin America Amateur Championship

- Santiago de la Fuente (a)

11. The winner of the 2023 U.S. Mid-Amateur Golf Championship

- Stewart Hagestad (a)

12. The winner of the 2023 NCAA Division I men's golf individual championship

- Fred Biondi forfeited his invitation by turning professional.

13. The leading 12 players, and those tying for 12th place, from the 2023 Masters Tournament

- Russell Henley (18,19,20)
- Viktor Hovland (16,17,18,19,20)
- Xander Schauffele (18,19,20)
- Sahith Theegala (17,19,20)
- Cameron Young (19,20)

14. The leading four players, and those tying for fourth place, in the 2023 U.S. Open

- Rory McIlroy (17,18,19,20)

15. The leading four players, and those tying for fourth place, in the 2023 Open Championship

- Jason Day (17,18,19,20)
- Tom Kim (17,18,19,20)
- Sepp Straka (17,18,19,20)

16. The leading four players, and those tying for fourth place, in the 2023 PGA Championship

- Cameron Davis (19)
- Kurt Kitayama (19,20)

17. Winners of tournaments on the PGA Tour between the 2023 Masters Tournament and the 2024 Masters Tournament (Note: Includes fall 2023 events, and events must carry full-point allocation towards the FedEx Cup in order to qualify.)

- Ludvig Åberg (19,20)
- Akshay Bhatia
- Keegan Bradley (18,19,20)
- Nick Dunlap
- Austin Eckroat (20)
- Tony Finau (18,19,20)
- Rickie Fowler (18,19,20)
- Lucas Glover (18,19,20)
- Emiliano Grillo (18,19,20)
- Lee Hodges
- Stephan Jäger (20)
- Chris Kirk (20)
- Jake Knapp (20)
- Luke List
- Peter Malnati
- Grayson Murray
- Matthieu Pavon (20)
- Nick Taylor (18,20)
- Erik van Rooyen
- Camilo Villegas

18. All players who qualified for and were eligible for the 2023 Tour Championship

- Sam Burns (19,20)
- Patrick Cantlay (19,20)
- Corey Conners (19,20)
- Tommy Fleetwood (19,20)
- Tyrrell Hatton (19,20)
- Max Homa (19,20)
- Im Sung-jae (19,20)
- Kim Si-woo (19,20)
- Taylor Moore
- Adam Schenk (19)

19. The leading 50 players on the Official World Golf Ranking as of December 31, 2023

- Eric Cole (20)
- Harris English (20)
- Ryan Fox (20)
- Adam Hadwin (20)
- Nicolai Højgaard (20)
- Min Woo Lee (20)
- Denny McCarthy
- Adrian Meronk
- J. T. Poston (20)
- Justin Rose
- Will Zalatoris (20)

20. The leading 50 players on the Official World Golf Ranking as of April 1, 2024

- An Byeong-hun

21. Special invitations

- Ryo Hisatsune
- Joaquín Niemann
- Thorbjørn Olesen

== Par 3 Contest ==
Wednesday, April 10

Rickie Fowler won the Par 3 Contest contest with a score of 22 (−5). There were five holes-in-one recorded, by Sepp Straka, Luke List, Gary Woodland, Viktor Hovland, and Lucas Glover.

== Round summaries ==
=== First round ===
Thursday, April 11, 2024
Friday, April 12, 2024

Inclement weather delayed the start of the tournament until 10:30 am Eastern time. As a result, 27 players did not complete the first round on Thursday.

The 8th hole, a par 5, saw a record-breaking total of 53 par-breaking scores, including 50 birdies and 3 eagles, the highest ever recorded on this hole in Masters history.

Place	Player	Score	To par
1	(United States) Bryson DeChambeau	65	−7
2	(United States) Scottie Scheffler	66	−6
T3	(United States) Max Homa	67	−5
T3	(Denmark) Nicolai Højgaard	67	−5
5	(England) Danny Willett	68	−4
T6	(Australia) Cameron Davis	69	−3
T6	(New Zealand) Ryan Fox	69	−3
T8	(South Korea) An Byeong-hun	70	−2
T8	(Canada) Corey Conners	70	−2
T8	(Chile) Joaquín Niemann	70	−2
T8	(France) Matthieu Pavon	70	−2
T8	(United States) Cameron Young	70	−2
T8	(United States) Will Zalatoris	70	−2

=== Second round ===
Friday, April 12, 2024

By making the cut, Tiger Woods set the record for most consecutive cuts made at the Masters, at 24. Phil Mickelson made the cut for the 28th time, surpassing Raymond Floyd and Bernhard Langer to move into solo fourth place for most cuts made at the Masters, trailing only Jack Nicklaus (37), Fred Couples (31) and Gary Player (30).

Rookie Ludvig Åberg posted the lowest score of the round, a 69, and advanced to a solo 7th place.

Bryson DeChambeau, before making a birdie on the 13th hole, moved a large directional sign that was in his line of play.

Patrick Cantlay achieved two eagles on par 4s, marking only the fourth instance in history that a player has recorded two par-4 eagles in a single Masters Tournament, the last being Brandt Jobe in 2006.

The cut came at 150 (+6), with 60 players advancing to the weekend. Notables to miss the cut included 2015 champion Jordan Spieth, 2020 champion Dustin Johnson, reigning U.S. Open champion Wyndham Clark, Open champion Brian Harman, and World No. 6 Viktor Hovland. Two-time major champion Justin Thomas played his last four holes in seven-over to miss the cut by one shot.

Place	Player	Score	To par
T1	(United States) Bryson DeChambeau	65-73=138	−6
T1	(United States) Max Homa	67-71=138	−6
T1	(United States) Scottie Scheffler	66-72=138	−6
4	(Denmark) Nicolai Højgaard	67-73=140	−4
T5	(Australia) Cameron Davis	69-72=141	−3
T5	(United States) Collin Morikawa	71-70=141	−3
7	(Sweden) Ludvig Åberg	73-69=142	−2
T8	(South Korea) An Byeong-hun	70-73=143	−1
T8	(England) Tommy Fleetwood	72-71=143	−1
T8	(New Zealand) Ryan Fox	69-74=143	−1
T8	(France) Matthieu Pavon	70-73=143	−1
T8	(Australia) Cameron Smith	71-72=143	−1
T8	(England) Danny Willett	68-75=143	−1
T8	(United States) Cameron Young	70-73=143	−1

=== Third round ===
Saturday, April 13, 2024

Scottie Scheffler, beginning the round in a three-way tie for the lead, chipped in for birdie on the first hole. After a double bogey on the 10th, Scheffler holed a 31-foot eagle putt on the par-five 13th, the only eagle recorded on that hole during the round. He also birdied the 15th and 18th to finish at seven under following a 71 (−1) to take a one-shot lead into the final round.

Collin Morikawa birdied his first three holes in a three-under round of 69 and finished at six under, one shot back of Scheffler. Max Homa, tied for the lead at the start of the round, didn't make a birdie in a one-over 73 and fell two back at 5 under. Bryson DeChambeau was also atop the leaderboard to begin the round but hit his third shot in the water on the 15th and made double bogey. He holed out for birdie on the 18th to finish at three under and four shots back of Scheffler. Ludvig Åberg, making his Masters and major championship debut, was four under on his round until a bogey at the 14th. He then left his third shot on the 15th short and three-putted from just off the green for another bogey. He shot 70 (–2) and ended up at four under.

Nicolai Højgaard moved into sole possession of the lead following a run of three straight birdies from holes 8 to 10, but he then made five straight bogeys including hitting into the water on both the 13th and 15th and finished at two under.

Tiger Woods carded a 10-over-par 82 for the third round, his highest score ever in a major championship.

No eagles were recorded on the par-5 15th hole through the first three rounds, marking only the second time in the past 50 years that No. 15 has failed to produce an eagle by this point in the tournament. Shane Lowry scored an eagle on the par-4 14th hole, marking the first eagle on this hole since Martin Kaymer in 2016.

Place	Player	Score	To par
1	(United States) Scottie Scheffler	66-72-71=209	−7
2	(United States) Collin Morikawa	71-70-69=210	−6
3	(United States) Max Homa	67-71-73=211	−5
4	(Sweden) Ludvig Åberg	73-69-70=212	−4
5	(United States) Bryson DeChambeau	65-73-75=213	−3
T6	(Australia) Cameron Davis	69-72-73=214	−2
T6	(Denmark) Nicolai Højgaard	67-73-74=214	−2
T6	(United States) Xander Schauffele	72-72-70=214	−2
T9	(South Korea) An Byeong-hun	70-73-72=215	−1
T9	(England) Tommy Fleetwood	72-71-72=215	−1
T9	(Australia) Cameron Smith	71-72-72=215	−1
T9	(United States) Cameron Young	70-73-72=215	−1

=== Final round ===
Sunday, April 14, 2024

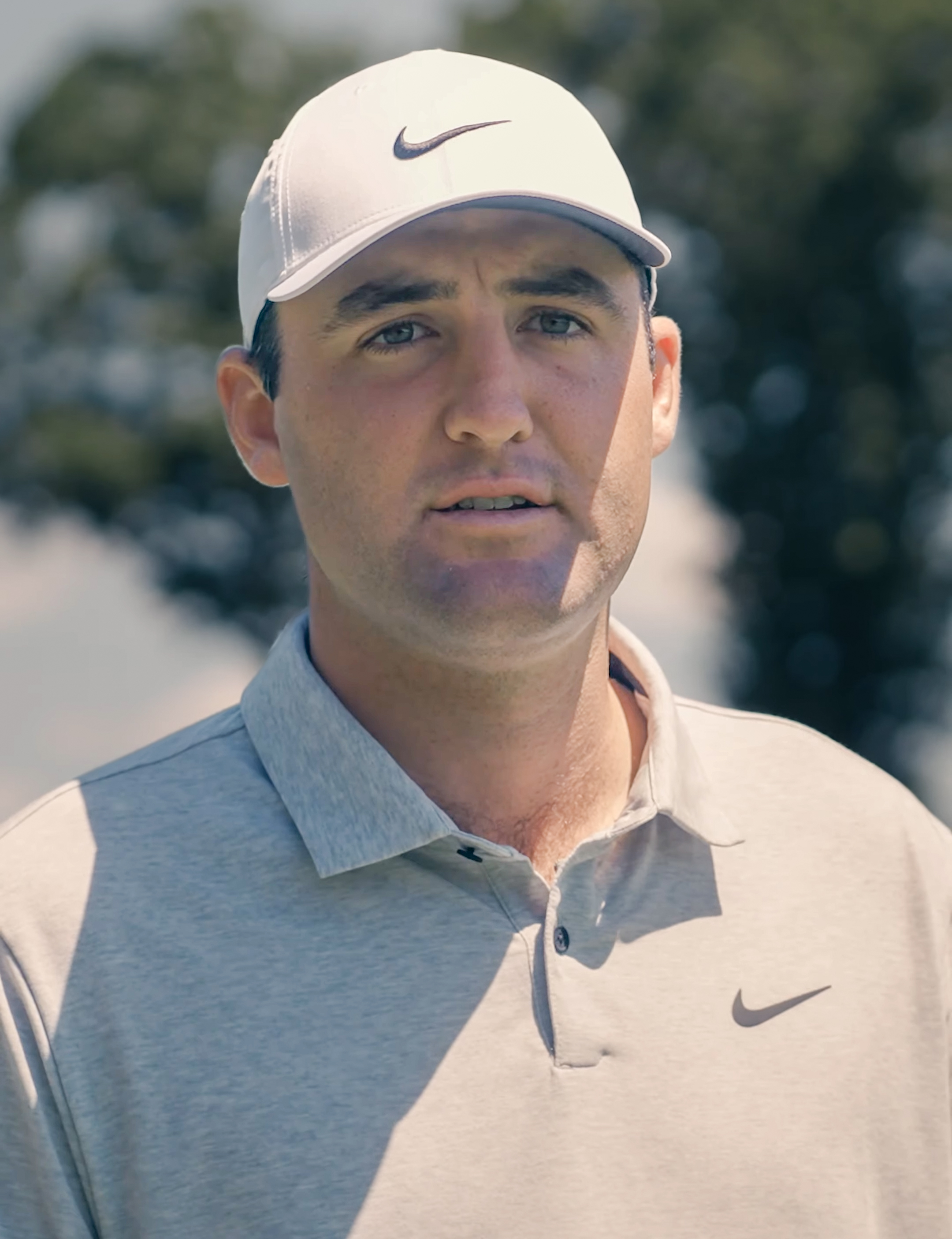
Scottie Scheffler won his second Masters title

External videos
- Full final round coverage on CBS on YouTube

World No. 1 Scottie Scheffler shot a four-under 68 to win his second Masters title in the last three years by four shots over runner-up Ludvig Åberg.

Scheffler began the round with a one-shot lead and birdied the third hole to go two shots ahead. He then bogeyed the fourth after hitting his tee shot over the green. Max Homa birdied the second, his first birdie in 34 holes, to get within one of the lead, while Åberg hit his approach on the seventh to four feet and made birdie to also get within one of the lead.

Scheffler bogeyed the seventh to create a three-way tie with Åberg and Collin Morikawa at six under, while Homa joined the lead with a two-putt birdie at the par-five eighth. Both Scheffler and Morikawa birdied the eighth to get to seven under, while Åberg holed a 36-foot birdie putt on the ninth to again tie. Scheffler then hit his approach on the ninth to within a foot for another birdie to get to 8 under and again in sole possession of the lead going to the second nine.

All three challengers then fell from contention. Morikawa hit his second shot on the ninth into a greenside bunker and couldn't advance on his third, ending up with a double bogey to fall three shots behind. He found the water on his approach at the 11th and made another double bogey. Åberg also hit into the water on the 11th for a double bogey. Homa got back within one with a close approach to the 10th, but his tee shot on the 12th flew over the green into the bushes and he was forced to take a drop. He made a double bogey on the hole to fall three shots behind.

Scheffler birdied the 10th, his third birdie in a row, to get to nine under and open a two-shot lead. Despite a bogey on the 11th, Scheffler two-putted for birdie at the par-five 13th and hit his second shot on the 14th to within four feet for another birdie to reach 10 under. He then made a nine-foot birdie putt on the par-three 16th to get to 11 under. Pars on his final two holes allowed him to close out the tournament with a four-shot victory.

Åberg birdied the 13th and 14th to get back to seven under and finish four back of Scheffler in his Masters and major championship debut. Morikawa and Homa both finished at four under for the tournament, in a tie for third place along with Tommy Fleetwood.

Champion
Silver Cup winner (leading amateur)
(a) = amateur
(c) = past champion

Place	Player	Score	To par	Money ($)
1	(United States) Scottie Scheffler (c)	66-72-71-68=277	−11	3,600,000
2	(Sweden) Ludvig Åberg	73-69-70-69=281	−7	2,160,000
T3	(England) Tommy Fleetwood	72-71-72-69=284	−4	1,040,000
T3	(United States) Max Homa	67-71-73-73=284	−4	1,040,000
T3	(United States) Collin Morikawa	71-70-69-74=284	−4	1,040,000
T6	(United States) Bryson DeChambeau	65-73-75-73=286	−2	695,000
T6	(Australia) Cameron Smith	71-72-72-71=286	−2	695,000
8	(United States) Xander Schauffele	72-72-70-73=287	−1	620,000
T9	(England) Tyrrell Hatton	72-74-73-69=288	E	540,000
T9	(United States) Cameron Young	70-73-72-73=288	E	540,000
T9	(United States) Will Zalatoris	70-77-72-69=288	E	540,000

Leaderboard below the top 10
Place	Player	Score	To par	Money ($)
T12	(Australia) Cameron Davis	69-72-73-75=289	+1	405,000
T12	(France) Matthieu Pavon	70-73-74-72=289	+1	405,000
T12	(United States) Patrick Reed (c)	74-70-73-72=289	+1	405,000
T12	(United States) Adam Schenk	73-71-72-73=289	+1	405,000
T16	(South Korea) An Byeong-hun	70-73-72-75=290	+2	310,000
T16	(Denmark) Nicolai Højgaard	67-73-74-76=290	+2	310,000
T16	(United States) Chris Kirk	74-75-68-73=290	+2	310,000
T16	(Austria) Sepp Straka	73-71-74-72=290	+2	310,000
T20	(United States) Lucas Glover	71-73-72-75=291	+3	250,000
T20	(United States) Taylor Moore	71-75-75-70=291	+3	250,000
T22	(United States) Keegan Bradley	78-71-74-69=292	+4	175,500
T22	(United States) Patrick Cantlay	71-75-70-76=292	+4	175,500
T22	(United States) Harris English	72-74-75-71=292	+4	175,500
T22	(England) Matt Fitzpatrick	71-73-73-75=292	+4	175,500
T22	(Australia) Min Woo Lee	74-74-75-69=292	+4	175,500
T22	(Northern Ireland) Rory McIlroy	71-77-71-73=292	+4	175,500
T22	(Chile) Joaquín Niemann	70-78-71-73=292	+4	175,500
T22	(Australia) Adam Scott (c)	76-74-70-72=292	+4	175,500
T30	(Australia) Jason Day	75-73-76-69=293	+5	124,200
T30	(United States) Rickie Fowler	76-74-71-72=293	+5	124,200
T30	(South Korea) Kim Si-woo	74-76-73-70=293	+5	124,200
T30	(South Korea) Tom Kim	72-78-77-66=293	+5	124,200
T30	(United States) J. T. Poston	75-74-74-70=293	+5	124,200
T35	(United States) Akshay Bhatia	72-75-74-73=294	+6	103,000
T35	(United States) Kurt Kitayama	71-73-82-68=294	+6	103,000
T35	(Colombia) Camilo Villegas	74-75-76-69=294	+6	103,000
T38	(Canada) Corey Conners	70-76-76-73=295	+7	86,000
T38	(New Zealand) Ryan Fox	69-74-77-75=295	+7	86,000
T38	(United States) Russell Henley	73-77-74-71=295	+7	86,000
T38	(United States) Luke List	75-75-71-74=295	+7	86,000
T38	(Japan) Hideki Matsuyama (c)	76-74-71-74=295	+7	86,000
T43	(Republic of Ireland) Shane Lowry	73-74-75-74=296	+8	72,000
T43	(United States) Phil Mickelson (c)	73-75-74-74=296	+8	72,000
T45	(United States) Brooks Koepka	73-73-76-75=297	+9	57,200
T45	(United States) Denny McCarthy	74-74-79-70=297	+9	57,200
T45	(Spain) José María Olazábal (c)	77-73-75-72=297	+9	57,200
T45	(Spain) Jon Rahm (c)	73-76-72-76=297	+9	57,200
T45	(United States) Sahith Theegala	74-74-74-75=297	+9	57,200
T45	(England) Danny Willett (c)	68-75-76-78=297	+9	57,200
51	(United States) Grayson Murray	76-74-78-70=298	+10	49,200
52	(United States) Eric Cole	73-72-81-73=299	+11	48,000
T53	(Canada) Adam Hadwin	75-73-82-70=300	+12	47,200
T53	(United States) Neal Shipley (a)	71-76-80-73=300	+12	0
T55	(United States) Tony Finau	71-78-72-80=301	+13	46,000
T55	(United States) Jake Knapp	74-76-78-73=301	+13	46,000
T55	(South Africa) Erik van Rooyen	71-76-78-76=301	+13	46,000
T58	(Denmark) Thorbjørn Olesen	71-79-77-75=302	+14	45,000
T58	(Fiji) Vijay Singh (c)	75-73-82-72=302	+14	45,000
60	(United States) Tiger Woods (c)	73-72-82-77=304	+16	44,400
CUT	(United States) Wyndham Clark	73-78=151	+7	
CUT	(United States) Nick Dunlap	77-74=151	+7	
CUT	(United States) Austin Eckroat	74-77=151	+7	
CUT	(Spain) Sergio García (c)	72-79=151	+7	
CUT	(United States) Lee Hodges	74-77=151	+7	
CUT	(South Korea) Im Sung-jae	77-74=151	+7	
CUT	(United States) Zach Johnson (c)	76-75=151	+7	
CUT	(England) Justin Rose	73-78=151	+7	
CUT	(United States) Justin Thomas	72-79=151	+7	
CUT	(Canada) Mike Weir (c)	74-77=151	+7	
CUT	(United States) Stewart Hagestad (a)	74-78=152	+8	
CUT	(Norway) Viktor Hovland	71-81=152	+8	
CUT	(South Africa) Christo Lamprecht (a)	74-78=152	+8	
CUT	(United States) Sam Burns	80-73=153	+9	
CUT	(United States) Brian Harman	81-72=153	+9	
CUT	(United States) Jordan Spieth (c)	79-74=153	+9	
CUT	(Mexico) Santiago de la Fuente (a)	76-78=154	+10	
CUT	(Germany) Stephan Jäger	74-80=154	+10	
CUT	(United States) Peter Malnati	82-72=154	+10	
CUT	(United States) Bubba Watson (c)	74-80=154	+10	
CUT	(South Africa) Charl Schwartzel (c)	74-81=155	+11	
CUT	(United States) Fred Couples (c)	80-76=156	+12	
CUT	(Japan) Ryo Hisatsune	78-78=156	+12	
CUT	(Australia) Jasper Stubbs (a)	80-76=156	+12	
CUT	(United States) Dustin Johnson (c)	78-79=157	+13	
CUT	(United States) Gary Woodland	76-81=157	+13	
CUT	(Poland) Adrian Meronk	78-80=158	+14	
CUT	(Canada) Nick Taylor	77-81=158	+14	
CUT	(Argentina) Emiliano Grillo	76-83=159	+15	

==== Scorecard ====
Hole	1	2	3	4	5	6	7	8	9	10	11	12	13	14	15	16	17	18
Par	4	5	4	3	4	3	4	5	4	4	4	3	5	4	5	3	4	4
(United States) Scheffler	−7	−7	−8	−7	−7	−7	−6	−7	−8	−9	−8	−8	−9	−10	−10	−11	−11	−11
(Sweden) Åberg	−4	−5	−5	−5	−5	−5	−6	−6	−7	−7	−5	−5	−6	−7	−7	−7	−7	−7
(England) Fleetwood	−2	−2	−2	−2	−2	−2	−3	−3	−3	−3	−3	−3	−4	−4	−4	−4	−4	−4
(United States) Homa	−5	−6	−6	−6	−6	−6	−5	−6	−6	−7	−7	−5	−5	−5	−5	−5	−4	−4
(United States) Morikawa	−6	−6	−6	−6	−6	−6	−6	−7	−5	−5	−3	−3	−4	−4	−5	−5	−5	−4
(United States) DeChambeau	−2	−2	−1	−2	−3	−3	−3	−3	−3	−3	−3	−3	−3	−3	−3	−3	−2	−2
(Australia) Smith	−1	−3	−3	−3	−2	−2	−2	−2	−2	−2	−2	−2	−2	−2	−2	−2	−2	−2
(United States) Schauffele	−2	−3	−3	−3	−2	−1	−1	−2	−2	−1	−1	E	−1	−1	−2	−2	−2	−1

Cumulative tournament scores, relative to par

Eagle	Birdie	Bogey	Double bogey
