= Golf at the Summer Youth Olympics =

- Governing body: IGF
- Events: 3 (men: 1; women: 1; mixed: 1)

Games
- 2010; 2014; 2018

Golf was inducted at the Youth Olympic Games at the second edition in 2014. This marked the return of Golf to the Olympics programme after 110 years, as it was voted an Olympic sport for the 2016 Summer Olympics.

== Medal summary ==
=== Boys' individual ===
Games	Gold	Silver	Bronze
2014 Nanjing	Renato Paratore; Italy	Marcus Kinhult; Sweden	Danthai Boonma; Thailand
2018 Buenos Aires	Karl Vilips; Australia	Akshay Bhatia; United States	Jerry Ji; Netherlands

=== Girls' individual ===
Games	Gold	Silver	Bronze
2014 Nanjing	Lee Soyoung; South Korea	Cheng Ssu-Chia; Chinese Taipei	Supamas Sangchan; Thailand
2018 Buenos Aires	Grace Kim; Australia	Alessia Nobilio; Italy	Emma Spitz; Austria

=== Mixed team ===
Games	Gold	Silver	Bronze
2014 Nanjing	Sweden; Marcus Kinhult; Linnea Ström	South Korea; Lee So-young; Youm Eun-ho	Italy; Renato Paratore; Virginia Elena Carta
2018 Buenos Aires	Thailand; Vanchai Luangnitikul; Atthaya Thitikul	United States; Akshay Bhatia; Lucy Li	Argentina; Mateo Fernandez De Oliveira; Ela Anacona

== Medal table ==
As of the 2018 Summer Youth Olympics.

Rank	Nation	Gold	Silver	Bronze	Total
1	Australia	2	0	0	2
2	Italy	1	1	1	3
3	South Korea	1	1	0	2
3	Sweden	1	1	0	2
5	Thailand	1	0	2	3
6	United States	0	2	0	2
7	Chinese Taipei	0	1	0	1
8	Argentina	0	0	1	1
8	Austria	0	0	1	1
8	Netherlands	0	0	1	1
Totals (10 entries)		6	6	6	18

== See also ==
- Golf at the Summer Olympics
