= Golf at the 2018 Summer Youth Olympics – Boys' individual =

Boys' individual at the III Summer Youth Olympic Games
- Venue: Hurlingham Club
- Dates: 9–11 October
- Competitors: 32 from 32 nations

Medalists
1st place, gold medalist(s)		Karl Vilips	Australia
2nd place, silver medalist(s)		Akshay Bhatia	United States
3rd place, bronze medalist(s)		Jerry Ji	Netherlands

These are the results for the boys' individual event at the 2018 Summer Youth Olympics.

== Schedule ==
All times are local (UTC−3).

Date	Time	Round
Tuesday, 9 October	10:42	Round 1
Wednesday, 10 October	10:42	Round 2
Thursday, 11 October	10:42	Round 3

== Results ==
Rank	Athlete	Nation	Round			Total	To par
Rank	Athlete	Nation	1	2	3	Total	To par
1st place, gold medalist(s)	Karl Vilips	Australia	69	68	69	206	−4
2nd place, silver medalist(s)	Akshay Bhatia	United States	69	69	70	208	−2
3rd place, bronze medalist(s)	Jerry Ji	Netherlands	72	71	68	211	+1
4	Vanchai Luangnitikul	Thailand	69	70	73	212	+2
5	Václav Tichý	Czech Republic	71	74	68	213	+3
5	Ryo Hisatsune	Japan	75	68	70	213	+3
7	Nicola Gerhardsen	Switzerland	71	69	74	214	+4
8	Andrea Romano	Italy	69	72	74	215	+5
9	Ingvar Andri Magnússon	Iceland	74	73	71	218	+8
9	Nicolai Højgaard	Denmark	73	70	75	218	+8
11	Bård Bjørnevik Skogen	Norway	78	70	71	219	+9
11	Mateo Fernández de Oliveira	Argentina	73	74	72	219	+9
13	Alejandro Madariaga	Mexico	74	75	71	220	+10
14	David Puig	Spain	72	78	72	222	+12
14	Lin Chau-tai	Chinese Taipei	72	73	77	222	+12
16	Park Sang-ha	South Korea	73	77	73	223	+13
16	Carl Jano Corpus	Philippines	71	76	76	223	+13
18	Thomas Boulanger	France	74	77	73	224	+14
18	Xie Qiantong	China	76	74	74	224	+14
20	Christoph Bleier	Austria	77	76	72	225	+15
21	Cole Stevens	South Africa	75	72	80	227	+17
22	Jean de Wouters	Belgium	78	75	75	228	+18
22	Lukas Buller	Germany	74	78	76	228	+18
24	Jimmy Zheng	New Zealand	73	75	81	229	+19
25	David Kitt	Ireland	80	78	77	235	+25
26	Ludvig Eriksson	Sweden	81	76	79	236	+26
26	Eemil Alajärvi	Finland	77	78	81	236	+26
28	William Duquette	Canada	80	79	82	241	+31
29	Terrence Coleman	Papua New Guinea	77	84	87	248	+38
30	Mohamed Al-Hajeri	United Arab Emirates	84	77	88	249	+39
31	Jordan Thompson	Nigeria	101	87	89	277	+67
	Joe Pagdin	Great Britain	71	71	WD		
