= Ohio Amateur =

The Ohio Amateur Championship hosted annually by the Ohio Golf Association (OGA) visits the a variety of courses in the state. The event is open to amateur golfers who are residents of the state of Ohio or attending a state university or college in Ohio. The first OGA event was held at the Cleveland Country Club and has been played annually since 1904 and involves four rounds of stroke play.

== Winners ==
- 2024 Andrew Bailey
- 2023 Andrew Bailey
- 2022 Ty Gingerich
- 2021 Max Watson
- 2020 Austin Greaser
- 2019 Maxwell Moldovan
- 2018 Brandon Hoelzer
- 2017 Austin Sipe
- 2016 Ryan Troyer
- 2015 Joo Young Lee
- 2014 Andrew Dorn
- 2013 Andrew Dorn
- 2012 Nathan Kern
- 2011 Korey Ward
- 2010 Michael Bernard
- 2009 Alex Martin
- 2008 Vaughn Snyder
- 2007 Jason Kokrak
- 2006 Jason Kokrak
- 2005 Chris Wilson
- 2004 Kyle Reifers
- 2003 Steven Paramore
- 2002 Kevin Kornowa
- 2001 Robert Gerwin
- 2000 Ben Curtis
- 1999 Ben Curtis
- 1998 Matt Ehlinger
- 1997 Andrew Montooth
- 1996 Robert Gerwin
- 1995 Alan Fadel
- 1994 Eric Frishette
- 1993 Robert Fairchild
- 1992 Randy Reifers
- 1991 Jeff Junk
- 1990 Steve Anderson
- 1989 Rob Moss
- 1988 Barry Fabyan
- 1987 Peter Hammar
- 1986 Randy Reifers
- 1985 Karl Zoller
- 1984 Jim Muething
- 1983 Brian Mogg
- 1982 Brian Fogt
- 1981 John Hamrick
- 1980 Rocky Miller
- 1979 John Cook
- 1978 John Cook
- 1977 Gary Trivisonno
- 1976 Taylor Metcalfe
- 1975 Rick Jones
- 1974 Kim Heisler
- 1973 Steve Groves
- 1972 Ludwig Schenk
- 1971 Jack Hesler
- 1970 Mike McCullough
- 1969 Gary Artz
- 1968 Bob Lewis
- 1967 Lalu Sabotin
- 1966 Bobby Littler
- 1965 Richard Flockenzier
- 1964 Carl Unis
- 1963 Robert Bourne
- 1962 Tony Blom
- 1961 Walter Stahl, Jr.
- 1960 Dan Carmichael
- 1959 Tony Blom
- 1958 Richard Schwartz
- 1957 Robert Ross
- 1956 Robert McCall
- 1955 Robert Rankin
- 1954 Arnold Palmer
- 1953 Arnold Palmer
- 1952 Francis Cardi
- 1951 Tom Jones, Jr.
- 1950 Harold Paddock Jr.
- 1949 Richard Evans
- 1948 Harold Paddock Jr.
- 1947 Robert Servis
- 1946 Edwin Preisler
- 1943–1945 No tournament due to World War II
- 1942 Frank Stranahan
- 1941 Frank Stranahan
- 1940 Robert Servis
- 1939 Robert Servis
- 1938 Maurice McCarthy
- 1937 Maurice McCarthy
- 1936 Robert Servis
- 1935 Neil Ransick
- 1934 Maurice McCarthy
- 1933 Robert Servis
- 1932 John Florio
- 1931 Robert Kepler
- 1930 Glen Bishop
- 1929 John Florio
- 1928 William Deuschle
- 1927 Denny Shute
- 1926 Parker Campbell
- 1925 Eddie Hasman
- 1924 Joe M. Wells
- 1923 Jack Munro
- 1922 Joe M. Wells
- 1921 Harold Weber
- 1920 Harold Weber
- 1919 DeWitt Balch
- 1918 Jack Munro
- 1917 Howard Hollinger
- 1916 Ira Holden
- 1915 Holland Hubbard
- 1914 Joe K. Bole
- 1913 Harold Weber
- 1912 DeWitt Balch
- 1911 Russell Jones
- 1910 Joe K. Bole
- 1909 Joe K. Bole
- 1908 T Sterling Beckwith
- 1907 Harold Weber
- 1906 Robert H. Crowell
- 1905 Charles H. Stanley
- 1904 T. Sterling Beckwith
