= Junior Invitational =

Amateur golf tournament

Tournament information
- Location: Graniteville, South Carolina, U.S.
- Established: 2011
- Course: Sage Valley Golf Club
- Par: 72
- Length: 7,437 yards (6,800 m)
- Organized by: SVJI Sports Foundation
- Format: 72-hole stroke play
- Month played: March

The Junior Invitational is an annual amateur golf tournament held at Sage Valley Golf Club in Graniteville, South Carolina, near Augusta, Georgia. It is a 72-hole, stroke play event that extends invitations to the top golfers in the world aged 18 or under; 36 boys and 24 girls compete for individual titles.

Founded in 2011, the Junior Invitational originally featured 54 of the best junior male golfers. The format changed in 2022 and a girls' championship was created, bringing the total number of invitations to 60. It is among the leading junior tournaments in the world and has been described as the "Masters of junior golf". Numerous winners of the Junior Invitational have subsequently found success as professional golfers, such as Joaquín Niemann and Scottie Scheffler.

== Background ==
In the 1990s, South Carolina real estate tycoon Weldon Wyatt pursued the idea of creating a golf club near Augusta National Golf Club. After five years of searching, he decided on a 9,500-acre forest in Graniteville, South Carolina, around 12 miles north of Augusta. Wyatt chose golf architect Tom Fazio to design the course, and in 2001 Sage Valley Golf Club was opened. Wyatt recalled in 2011, "I used to work right down here in Graniteville for $35 a week, delivering groceries." He stated that he later bought the buildings where he had previously worked, adding: "I think when we opened [at Sage Valley] someone interviewed me and I said all of us have dreams, I was just fortunate enough for my dream to come true."

Regarding the course, Fazio stated: "I don't mind if people say it looks like Augusta National—both courses have dramatic rolling terrain, lots of pine trees, water, dogwoods, azaleas and all that good stuff. But I didn't want to copy Augusta National. That would have been easy, but it wouldn't have been fun. The real challenge was to produce something totally different that's only 15 minutes away." Sage Valley attempted to recreate features found at Augusta National, including on-site lodging for its members and a jacket policy in the clubhouse dining room. Sage Valley also recruited employees from Augusta National, such as head professional Eric Pedersen, cellar master Frank Carpenter, and about two dozen caddies. As of 2005, the club had 180 members, each of whom paid around $100,000 as an initiation fee. Sage Valley was ranked at No. 78 in Golf Digest's 2005–06 list of America's Greatest Golf Courses.

Augusta businessman Paul Simon approached Wyatt about the possibility of hosting a fundraiser at Sage Valley for the First Tee of Augusta. Wyatt initially declined, but he reconsidered after a high school golf tournament which he had organized for 13 years alongside his son Tom (an accomplished junior golfer who subsequently played collegiately at Furman University) began to wind down. Wyatt contacted Simon and in 2009 they announced the creation of a junior tournament to be held at Sage Valley, benefiting the First Tee. As with the high school tournament, all expenses including travel costs for the participants was covered, and players were to be lodged at Sage Valley. Wyatt stated that he was inspired by the William James quote: "The great use of life is to spend it for something that will outlast it."

== History ==
The first edition of the Junior Invitational took place in 2011, featuring 54 of the top junior players in the world. PGA Tour commissioner Tim Finchem officiated the trophy presentation, and $200,000 was contributed to the First Tee. Golfweek ranked it as the No. 1 junior tournament of the year. The inaugural champion was Nicholas Reach, who shot a course-record 62 in the first round and ultimately finished eight shots ahead of runner-up Patrick Rodgers. Due to this win, Reach received an invite to the Nationwide Tour's Melwood Prince George's County Open that year. Former President George W. Bush spoke at the opening ceremony of the tournament in 2012 in his role as honorary chairman of the First Tee.

The Junior Invitational made an intentional effort to resemble the Masters Tournament, including awarding champions with a gold jacket reminiscent of the Masters green jacket. Dave Christensen, general manager of Sage Valley, stated in 2011: "That's an aggressive goal, certainly; making our own junior version of what they do down in Augusta, but you never achieve greatness unless you aim for greatness." Brentley Romine of Golfweek stated in 2018 that the tournament is "commonly referred to as the Masters of junior golf." As of 2025, the course at Sage Valley for the Junior Invitational plays as a 7,437-yard par-72 from the championship tees. Due to Hurricane Helene, Sage Valley lost over 1,000 trees prior to the 2025 tournament, which changed the aesthetic of the course.

In 2015, the SVJI Sports Foundation was created to oversee the tournament and its charitable activities; the foundation donated over $2 million to local chapters of the First Tee by 2020. Originally held each year in April, the event moved to March beginning in 2020 due to scheduling conflicts with International Golf Federation events. The 2021 edition of the tournament was canceled as a result of the COVID-19 pandemic.

The tournament's format changed beginning in 2022, and a girls' competition was created. The new format consisted of 36 boys and 24 girls competing for individual titles. The format change was announced in 2019 and set to begin in 2021, but was delayed due to the cancellation of the tournament. The inaugural champion of the girls' event was Amalie Leth-Nissen, who defeated Bailey Shoemaker in a playoff. The tournament increased from a three-day, 54-hole event to a four-day, 72-hole event in 2025. In 2026, Miles Russell and Asterisk Talley became the first players to record multiple wins at the Junior Invitational.

== Winners ==
=== Boys ===
Year	Winner	Score	Margin of victory	Runner(s)-up
2026	(United States) Miles Russell (2)	64-70-72-67=273	3 strokes	(United States) Tyler Watts
2025	(United States) Miles Russell	69-70-70-70=279	2 strokes	(United States) Jackson Byrd
2024	(Italy) Giovanni Binaghi	70-68-69=207	2 strokes	(Czech Republic) Louis Klein
2023	(South Africa) Aldrich Potgieter	65-70-68=203	10 strokes	(South Korea) Byungho Lee, (United States) Aaron Pounds
2022	(United States) Caleb Surratt	67-65-70=202	Playoff	(United States) Luke Potter
2021	Canceled due to the COVID-19 pandemic			
2020	(United States) Jackson Van Paris	71-69-67=207	2 strokes	(United States) Luke Potter
2019	(Ireland) Tom McKibbin	64-75-71=210	1 stroke	(United States) Maxwell Moldovan
2018	(United States) Akshay Bhatia	68-70-76=214	1 stroke	(United States) Frankie Capan
2017	(Chile) Joaquín Niemann	67-70-67=204	4 strokes	(United States) Austin Eckroat
2016	(United States) Austin Eckroat	65-70-75=210	1 stroke	(Australia) Min Woo Lee
2015	(Sweden) Marcus Kinhult	69-71-69=209	1 stroke	(United States) Davis Shore
2014	(United States) Scottie Scheffler	71-69-71=211	1 stroke	(United States) Cameron Champ
2013	(United States) Carson Young	72-70-70=212	2 strokes	(England) Sam Horsfield, (United States) Austin Langdale, (United States) Robby Shelton, (United States) Greyson Sigg
2012	(United States) Zachary Olsen	68-68-73=209	3 strokes	(United States) Wyndham Clark, (United States) Taylor Moore, (United States) Matthew NeSmith, (United States) Robby Shelton
2011	(United States) Nicholas Reach	62-66-68=196	8 strokes	(United States) Patrick Rodgers

=== Girls ===
Year	Winner	Score	Margin of victory	Runner-up
2026	(United States) Asterisk Talley (2)	69-75-69-67=280	3 strokes	(Japan) Anna Iwanaga
2025	(Canada) Aphrodite Deng	70-72-66-73=281	6 strokes	(China) Yujie Liu
2024	(United States) Asterisk Talley	70-70-67=207	6 strokes	(Philippines) Rianne Malixi
2023	(United States) Anna Davis	70-69-70=209	2 strokes	(Japan) Nika Ito
2022	(Denmark) Amalie Leth-Nissen	72-68-71=211	Playoff	(United States) Bailey Shoemaker

== Records ==
Boys

- Lowest round: 62 (−10), Nicholas Reach (1st round, 2011); Justin Thomas (3rd round, 2011)
- Lowest winning score (54 holes): 196 (−20), Nicholas Reach (2011)
- Lowest winning score (72 holes): 273 (−15), Miles Russell (2026)
- Largest margin of victory: 10 strokes, Aldrich Potgieter (2023)

Girls

- Lowest round: 65 (−7), Bailey Shoemaker (2nd round, 2022)
- Lowest winning score (54 holes): 207 (−9), Asterisk Talley (2024)
- Lowest winning score (72 holes): 280 (−8), Asterisk Talley (2026)
- Largest margin of victory: 6 strokes, Asterisk Talley (2024), Aphrodite Deng (2025)
