= Junior Presidents Cup =

Tournament information
- Location: 2026: Medinah, Illinois, U.S.
- Established: 2017
- Course: 2026: Medinah Country Club
- Format: Match play
- Month played: September

Current champion
- United States

The Junior Presidents Cup is a junior team golf competition between the United States and an International team representing the rest of the world excluding Europe. It is based around the Presidents Cup and is run by the PGA Tour and American Junior Golf Association. The inaugural event took place at the Plainfield Country Club, Edison, New Jersey on September 25 and 26, 2017. The United States have won all five events that have been contested.

== Qualification ==
The teams consist of 12 junior boys. Participants must be at least 12 years old at the start of the event and must be 18 or younger and have not yet graduated high school as of January 1 of the year of the contest. Players must be amateurs who have not yet started college and are not members of a competitive collegiate golf program. Members of each team mostly qualify through a ranking system, the United States team based on the Rolex AJGA Rankings, and the International Team based on the World Amateur Golf Rankings.

In 2017 11 members of each team were selected based on the rankings on August 3 with the final place being given to the leading player in the rankings, not already qualified, on September 6. In 2019 all 12 members of the team were selected based on the rankings on September 5. In 2022 10 members of each team were selected based on the rankings on August 19, with one player selected by the team captain and the final place being given to the leading player in the rankings, not already qualified, on September 8.

== Format ==
The event is held over two days, with six fourballs and six foursomes matches on the first day, and twelve singles matches on the second day.

== Results ==
Year	Venue	Location	Winning team	Score	USA captain	International captain
2026	Medinah Country Club	Medinah, Illinois	United States	17.5–6.5	Matt Kuchar	(Chinese Taipei) Pan Cheng-tsung
2024	Le Club Laval-sur-le-Lac	Quebec, Canada	United States	15–9	Charley Hoffman	(Canada) Graham DeLaet
2022	Myers Park Country Club	Charlotte, North Carolina	United States	13–11	Notah Begay III	(South Africa) Tim Clark
2019	Royal Melbourne Golf Club	Melbourne, Australia	United States	13–11	Justin Leonard	(Australia) Stuart Appleby
2017	Plainfield Country Club	Edison, New Jersey	United States	14–10	David Toms	(South Africa) Trevor Immelman

== Teams ==
=== United States ===
- 2026: Rory Asselta, Ronin Banerjee, Brady Barnum, Grayson Baucom, Sam Carraher, Hayes Corcell, Grant DeLorenzo, Jessy Huebner, Sohan Patel, Giuseppe Puebla, Miles Russell, Jaden Soong
- 2024: Pennson Badgett, Ronin Banerjee, Blades Brown, Jackson Byrd, Luke Colton, Will Hartman, Tyler Mawhinney, Logan Reilly, Michael Riebe, Miles Russell, Asher Vargas, Tyler Watts
- 2022: Johnnie Clark, Ethan Gao, Nicholas Gross, Henry Guan, Bryan Kim, Carson Kim, Jackson Koivun, Eric Lee, P. J. Maybank, Matt Moloney, Aaron Pounds, Preston Stout
- 2019: Stephen Campbell Jr., Canon Claycomb, Jack Heath, Ben James, Maxwell Moldovan, Brett Roberts, Vishnu Sadagopan, Ian Siebers, Preston Summerhays, Michael Thorbjornsen, Jackson Van Paris, Alex Yang
- 2017: Garrett Barber, Akshay Bhatia, Jacob Bridgeman, Prescott Butler, Canon Claycomb, Noah Goodwin, Cole Hammer, Joe Highsmith, Eugene Hong, Turner Hosch, William Mouw, Trent Phillips

=== International ===
- 2026: Tomas Del Grosso, Settawut Kenanan, Minsu Kim, Zhi Li, Cooper Moore, Taisei Nagasaki, Tuan Anh Nguyen, Fernando Saravia, Jeyi Son, Jun Tian, Emilio Velez, Qiyou Wu
- 2024: Joshua Bai, Warut Boonrod, Xihuan Chang, Le Khanh Hung, Samuel Gonzalez, Liangliang Gu, Antoine Jasmin, Rayhan Abdul Latief, Thanawin Lee, Nguyen Anh Minh, Kartik Singh, Hanjie Yu
- 2022: Joshua Bai, Ding Wenyi, Jayden Ford, Jeffrey Guan, Jonathan Xavier Hartono, Pongsapak Laopakdee, Rayhan Abdul Latief, Aldrich Potgieter, Yurav Premlall, Chris Richards Jr., Juan Carlos Velasquez, Anson Yeo
- 2019: Jordan Duminy, Joshua Greer, Bo Jin, Christo Lamprecht, Lee Jang-hyun, Lin Chuan-tai, Jayden Schaper, Kartik Sharma, Samuel Simpson, Karl Vilips, Martin Vorster, Andi Xu
- 2017: Joshua Armstrong, Luca Filippi, Garrick Higgo, Christo Lamprecht, Fred Lee, Sean Maruyama, Naraajie Emerald Ramadhan, Jayden Schaper, Rayhan Thomas, Karl Vilips, Atiruj Winaicharoenchai, Wocheng Ye

== See also ==
- Junior Ryder Cup
