= Junior Players Championship =

Amateur golf tournament in the United States

Tournament information
- Location: Ponte Vedra Beach, Florida, U.S.
- Established: 2007
- Course: TPC Sawgrass
- Par: 72
- Organized by: American Junior Golf Association (AJGA)
- Format: Stroke play
- Month played: September

Current champion
- (United States) Miles Russell

Location in Florida

The Junior Players Championship is a leading annual junior golf tournament in the United States for male amateur golfers under the age of 19.

The tournament has been played since 2007 and is organized by the American Junior Golf Association. It is held at the Players Stadium Course at TPC Sawgrass in Floria, home of The Players Championship on the PGA Tour. The field is made up of the top 58 boys on the AJGA Rankings, plus international invitees.

In 2023, Miles Russell, at 14 years old, became the youngest champion in the event's history. In 2025, he became the first two-time winner.

== Winners ==
Year	Winner	Country/State	Score	To par	Note
2026	J. P. Lynch	(United States) Texas	71-71-66=208	−8	
2025	Miles Russell (2)	(United States) Florida	68-69-70=207	−9	
2024	Hamilton Coleman	(United States) Georgia	72-68-70=210	−6	
2023	Miles Russell	(United States) Florida	70-66-71=207	−9	
2022	Jeffrey Guan	Australia	67-69-64=200	−16	
2021	Ben James	(United States) Connecticut	69-71-68=208	−8	
2020	David Ford	(United States) Georgia	72-73-66=211	−5	
2019	Jayden Schaper	South Africa	69-71-70=210	−6	
2018	Travis Vick	(United States) Texas	70-68-70=208	−8	(Note: Travis Vick defeated Akshay Bhatia and Bo Jin of China on the second hole of a sudden-death playoff)
2017	Shuai Ming Wong	Hong Kong	71-71-70=212	−4	(Note: Shuai Ming Wong defeated Logan McCallister and Jame Beber-Frankel in a three-hole aggregate playoff)
2016	Khavish Varadan	Malaysia	73-65-68=206	−10	(Note: Khavish Varadan defeated Cole Hammer on the first hole of a sudden-death playoff)
2015	Kevin Yu	Taiwan	73-71-67=211	−5	
2014	Sam Horsfield	England	71-69-73=213	−3	
2013	Austen Truslow	(United States) Florida	71-67-75=213	−3	
2012	Robby Shelton IV	(United States) Alabama	70-67-72=209	−7	
2011	Gavin Hall	(United States) New York	72-64-75=211	−5	
2010	Michael Johnson	(United States) Alabama	68-72-72=212	−4	
2009	Bobby Wyatt	(United States) Alabama	66-73-71=210	−6	
2008	Evan Beck	(United States) Virginia	70-69-70=209	−7	
2007	Morgan Hoffmann	(United States) New Jersey	71-67-71=209	−7	
