= Karl Vilips =

Australian professional golfer (born 2001)

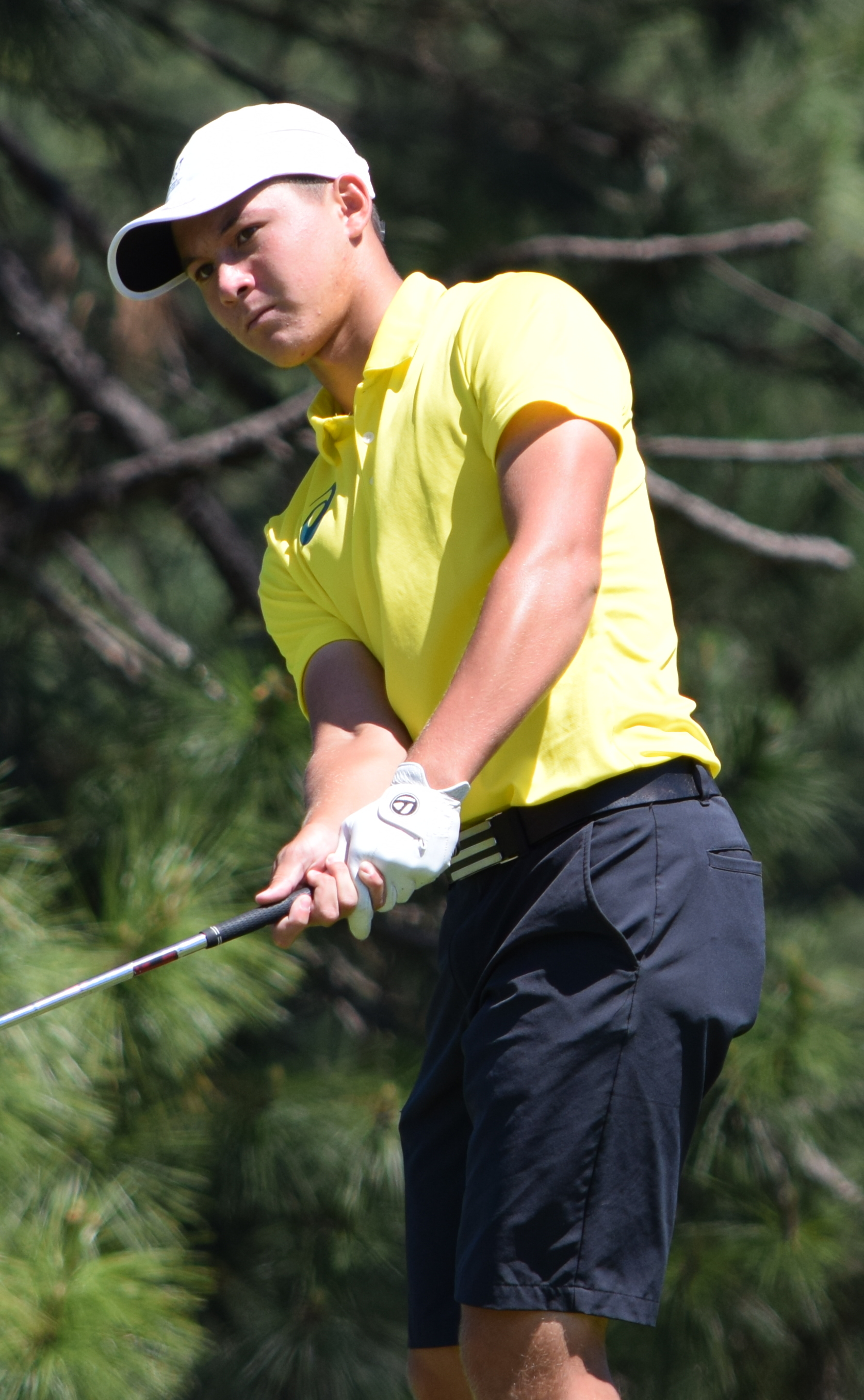

Personal information
- Nickname: Koala Karl
- Nationality: Australia
- Born: 16 August 2001 (age 25) Jakarta, Indonesia

Career
- Sport: Golf
- College: Stanford University
- Turned professional: 2024
- Current tour: PGA Tour
- Former tour: Korn Ferry Tour
- Professional wins: 2

Number of wins by tour
- PGA Tour: 1
- Korn Ferry Tour: 1

Best results in major championships
- Masters Tournament: DNP
- PGA Championship: CUT: 2025
- U.S. Open: CUT: 2023
- The Open Championship: DNP

Achievements and awards
- Korn Ferry Tour Rookie of the Year: 2024
Medal record
Youth Olympic Games
Gold medal – first place	2018 Buenos Aires	Boys' individual

Karl Vilips (born 16 August 2001) is an Australian professional golfer and PGA Tour player. He won the 2025 Puerto Rico Open.

== Amateur career ==
Vilips played for the international team at the 2017 Junior Presidents Cup. He represented Australia at the 2018 Summer Youth Olympics in Buenos Aires together with Grace Kim, and won the boy's individual gold.

Individually, he won the 2017 Southern Amateur and was runner-up at the 2019 Rolex Tournament of Champions, the 2020 Junior Players Championship and the 2023 North and South Amateur.

Vilips attended Stanford University between 2021 and 2024, and played with the Stanford Cardinal men's golf team. He was named to the 2021 All-Pac-12 Newcomer Team and 2023 All-America honorable mention. He won the Pac-12 Championship as a senior.

== Professional career ==
Vilips turned professional after graduating in 2024 and joined the Korn Ferry Tour, where he was runner-up at the NV5 Invitational and won the Utah Championship. He was named as the Korn Ferry Tour Rookie of the Year for the 2024 season.

Vilips finished 19th in the rankings to graduate to the 2025 PGA Tour. In his rookie PGA Tour season he won the Puerto Rico Open, three strokes ahead of Rasmus Neergaard-Petersen, in only his fourth start.

== Personal life ==
Vilips' father, Paul, has a YouTube channel which documented Karl's journey as a golfer since he was age 7. Hence Vilips is known as the "original YouTube golfer". Vilips gave credit to the YouTube channel for his success, as it helped fundraise him to participate in many junior golf tournaments as a kid, which resulted in him getting golf scholarships which propelled him to success in professional golf.

== Amateur wins ==
- 2016 Junior Orange Bowl International
- 2017 Polo Golf Junior Classic, Southern Amateur
- 2018 Wyndham Invitational
- 2024 Pac-12 Championship

== Professional wins (2) ==
=== PGA Tour wins (1) ===
No.	Date	Tournament	Winning score	To par	Margin of victory	Runner-up
1	9 Mar 2025	Puerto Rico Open	65-67-66-64=262	−26	3 strokes	(Denmark) Rasmus Neergaard-Petersen

=== Korn Ferry Tour wins (1) ===
No.	Date	Tournament	Winning score	To par	Margin of victory	Runners-up
1	27 May 2024	Utah Championship	67-62-64-66=259	−25	2 strokes	(United States) Matt McCarty, (United States) Joe Weiler

== Results in major championships ==
Tournament	2023	2024	2025
Masters Tournament			
PGA Championship			CUT
U.S. Open	CUT		
The Open Championship			

Did not play

CUT = missed the half-way cut

== Results in The Players Championship ==
Tournament	2025	2026
The Players Championship	CUT	CUT

CUT = missed the half-way cut

== Team appearances ==
Amateur

- Junior Presidents Cup (representing the International team): 2017
- Summer Youth Olympics mixed team (representing Australia): 2018

== See also ==
- 2024 Korn Ferry Tour graduates
