= Miles Russell (golfer) =

American amateur golfer (born 2008)

Personal information
- Nationality: United States
- Born: November 1, 2008 (age 18) Jacksonville Beach, Florida, U.S.

Career
- Sport: Golf
- Status: Amateur

Best results in major championships
- Masters Tournament: DNP
- PGA Championship: DNP
- U.S. Open: T39: 2026
- The Open Championship: DNP

Achievements and awards
- AJGA Player of the Year: 2023, 2025

Miles Russell (born November 1, 2008) is an American amateur golfer and two-time AJGA Player of the Year. In 2024, as a 15-year-old high school freshman, he became the youngest player to make the cut on the Korn Ferry Tour when he tied for 20th at the LECOM Suncoast Classic.

== Early life and amateur career ==
Russell hails from Jacksonville Beach, Florida. He was introduced to golf at the age of two by his dad and grandfather, and trains at Atlantic Beach Country Club. He is a left-handed golfer.

Russell enjoyed a successful junior career, winning the US Kids World Championship twice. In 2023, he won the Junior PGA Championship and the Junior Players Championship, and surpassed Tiger Woods to become the youngest golfer to win the American Junior Golf Association Boys Player of the Year, just a day after his 15th birthday. He won the 2024 Rolex Tournament of Champions.

In 2024, he made four starts in professional tournaments. He almost Monday qualified for the 2024 Puerto Rico Open on the PGA Tour in March after shooting a 67, but just missed out after losing a playoff for the fourth and final spot. At the LECOM Suncoast Classic, his first of two starts on the Korn Ferry Tour, he opened with rounds of 68-66 to become the youngest, at 15 years old, to make the cut on the tour. He closed with rounds of 70-66 and tied for 20th with a 14-under 270, to become the youngest to record a top-20 finish on either the Korn Ferry or PGA Tour. On the PGA Tour, he started in the Rocket Mortgage Classic and the Butterfield Bermuda Championship, where he narrowly missed the cut. His scoring average in these events was 69.64.

Russell declined a spot on the U.S. Junior National Golf team due to scheduling conflicts. In July 2025, Russell verbally committed to play college golf at Florida State University.

In August 2025, Russell became the first two-time winner of the Junior Players Championship. He helped win the 2025 Junior Ryder Cup and was again named AJGA Player of the Year, becoming just the seventh player ever to receive the honor twice, joining Tiger Woods, Phil Mickelson, Brian Harman, Peter Uihlein, Noah Goodwin and Tracy Phillips.

== Amateur wins ==
- 2019 FJT at Palatka Golf Club (11-12 and 9-10), FJT at Sandridge Golf Club (11-12 and 9-10), FJT at Sandridge Golf Club (11-12 and 9-10)
- 2020 US Kids World Championship (Boys 11 Division), FJT Cypress Creek Open (9-12)
- 2021 Futures Championship (11-12 and 9-10), US Kids World Championship (Boys 12 Division), FJT Fairwinds Open (9-12)
- 2022 FJT University of Florida (13-15), FJT Capital City Open (13-15), FJT Heritage Oaks (13-15)
- 2023 FJT Amelia Island Open (13-15), FJT LPGA Open (16-18), FJT Redland Open (16-18), TaylorMade TP5 Junior All-Star, Moon Golf Junior All-Star, Junior PGA Championship, FJT Sugar Mill Open (16-18), Junior Players Championship
- 2024 FJT Deerwood Open, Elite Invitational, Rolex Tournament of Champions, South Beach International Amateur
- 2025 AJGA Simplify Boys Championship at Carlton Woods, Junior Invitational, Junior Players Championship
- 2026 Junior Invitational

NB. All wins from the 2023 Junior PGA Championship onwards except for the two Florida Junior Tour events are in World Amateur Golf Ranking eligible events.

== Results in major championships ==
Tournament	2026
Masters Tournament	
PGA Championship	
U.S. Open	T39
The Open Championship	

Did not play

"T" = tied

== U.S. national team appearances ==
- Junior Ryder Cup: 2023, 2025 (winners)
- Junior Presidents Cup: 2024 (winners), 2026 (winners)
- Walker Cup: 2026
