= Maxwell Moldovan =

American professional golfer (born 2002)

Personal information
- Nationality: United States
- Born: February 22, 2002 (age 24) Uniontown, Ohio, U.S.

Career
- Sport: Golf
- College: Ohio State University
- Turned professional: 2024
- Current tour: PGA Tour Americas
- Professional wins: 1

Best results in major championships
- Masters Tournament: DNP
- PGA Championship: DNP
- U.S. Open: 65th: 2023
- The Open Championship: DNP

Maxwell Moldovan (born February 22, 2002) is an American professional golfer from Uniontown, Ohio.

== Amateur career ==
Moldovan attended Green High School where he was a two-time OHSAA Division 1 individual champion. After high school, he golfed for the Ohio State Buckeyes where he won four events and was a multiple-time All-American. He also won the 2019 Ohio Amateur and the 2021 Southern Amateur.

Moldovan qualified for the 2022 U.S. Open, where he missed the cut. At the 2023 U.S. Open, Moldovan made the cut to finish in last place.

== Professional career ==
Moldovan turned professional in June 2024 after graduating from Ohio State. His first event as a professional was the 2024 U.S. Open. He was an alternate from the Springfield, Ohio qualifier.

== Amateur wins ==
- 2019 Ohio Amateur
- 2021 Southern Amateur
- 2022 Nexus Collegiate, Southern Invitational, Robert Kepler Intercollegiate
- 2023 NCAA Auburn Regional

== Professional wins (1) ==
=== PGA Tour Americas wins (1) ===
No.	Date	Tournament	Winning score	Margin of victory	Runner-up
1	Apr 6, 2025	ECP Brazil Open	−18 (63-67-68-68=266)	1 stroke	(United States) George Markham

== Results in major championships ==
Tournament	2022	2023	2024	2025
Masters Tournament				
PGA Championship				
U.S. Open	CUT	65	CUT	CUT
The Open Championship				

Did not play

CUT = missed the half-way cut

== U.S. national team appearances ==
- Junior Presidents Cup: 2019 (winners)
- Arnold Palmer Cup: 2023
