= Golf at the 2018 Summer Youth Olympics =

Golf at the III Summer Youth Olympic Games
- Venue: Hurlingham Club
- Dates: 9–15 October 2018
- No. of events: 3 (1 men's, 1 women's, 1 mixed)
- Competitors: 64 from 33 nations

Golf at the 2018 Summer Youth Olympics was held at the Hurlingham Club in Buenos Aires, Argentina from 9 to 15 October 2018.

== Qualification ==
Each National Olympic Committee (NOC) can enter a team of 2 athletes of 1 male and 1 female. As hosts, Argentina was given a team to compete and a further 5 teams of 2 athletes was decided by the Tripartite Commission. The remaining 26 teams were decided by adding the ranking place of the top ranked eligible male and female golfers on the World Amateur Golf Rankings released on 25 July 2018. The 26 NOCs with the lowest combined rankings qualified.

To be eligible to participate at the Youth Olympics athletes must have been born between 1 January 2000 and 31 December 2003. Furthermore, all athletes must be amateur golfers who hold a recognised handicap index not exceeding 6.4.

Event	Date	Total places	Qualified nations
Host nation	–	1	Argentina
Combined World Amateur Golf Rankings	25 July 2018	26	United States; Sweden; Thailand; Ireland; Spain; China; Denmark; Great Britain; Italy; Canada; Germany; Australia; South Korea (men's only); Japan; Mexico; New Zealand; Chinese Taipei; France; Finland; Philippines; Norway; Austria; Netherlands; Switzerland; South Africa; Belgium
Tripartite invitation	–	4 ~~5~~	Iceland; Nigeria; Papua New Guinea; ~~Saint Lucia~~; United Arab Emirates
Reallocation	–	2	Czech Republic; Indonesia (women's only)
Total: 33 NOCs			

== Medal summary ==
=== Medal table ===
* Host nation (Argentina)

Rank	Nation	Gold	Silver	Bronze	Total
1	Australia	2	0	0	2
2	Thailand	1	0	0	1
3	United States	0	2	0	2
4	Italy	0	1	0	1
5	Argentina*	0	0	1	1
5	Austria	0	0	1	1
5	Netherlands	0	0	1	1
Totals (7 entries)		3	3	3	9

=== Events ===
Event	Gold	Silver	Bronze
Men's individual	Karl Vilips; Australia	Akshay Bhatia; United States	Jerry Ji; Netherlands
Women's individual	Grace Kim; Australia	Alessia Nobilio; Italy	Emma Spitz; Austria
Mixed team	Thailand; Vanchai Luangnitikul; Atthaya Thitikul	United States; Akshay Bhatia; Lucy Li	Argentina; Mateo Fernández de Oliveira; Ela Anacona
