= Sepp Straka =

Austrian professional golfer (born 1993)

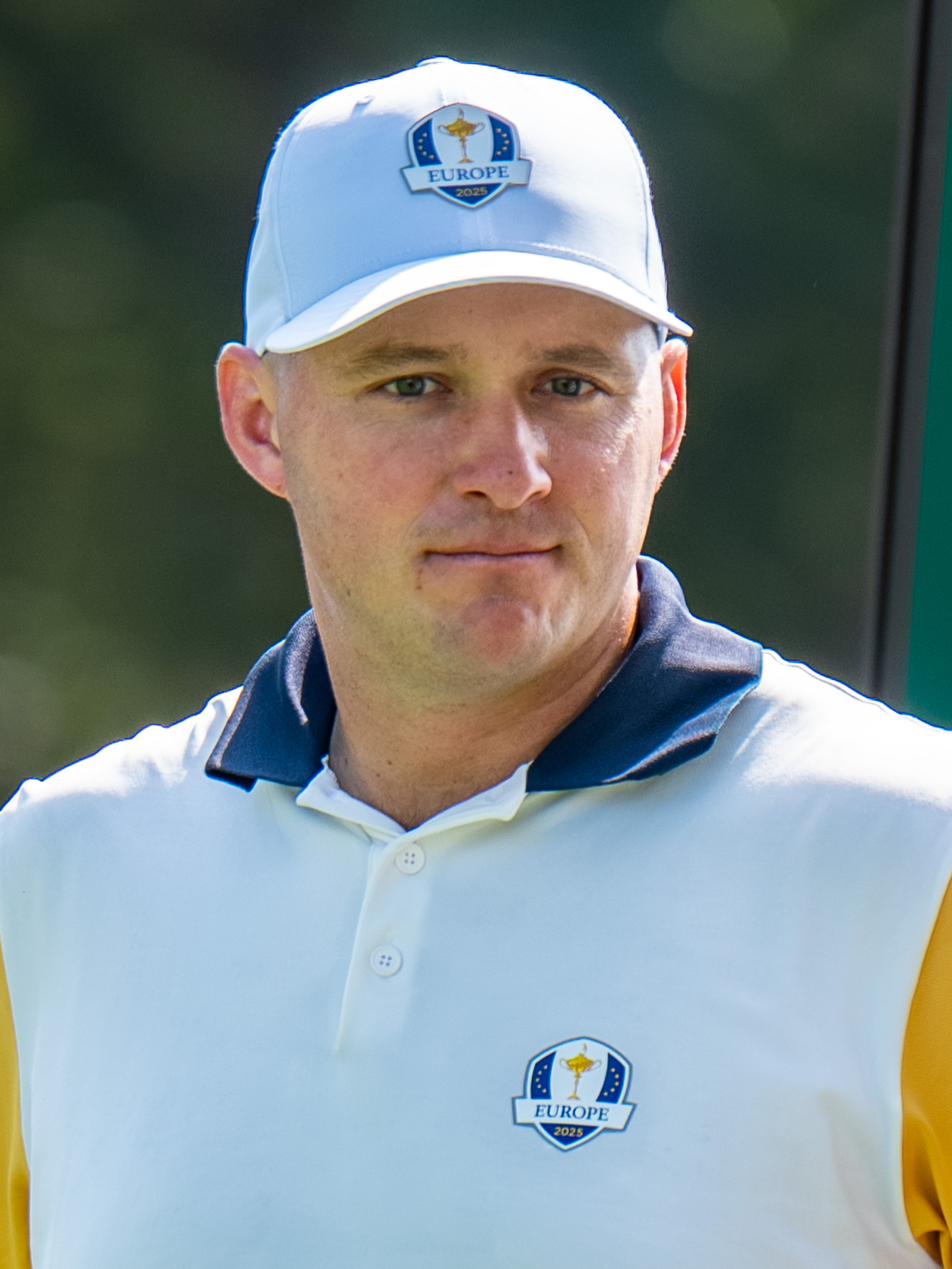
- Straka at the 2025 Ryder Cup

Personal information
- Full name: Josef Straka
- Nickname: Sepp
- Nationality: Austria
- Born: 1 May 1993 (age 33) Vienna, Austria
- Height: 6 ft 3 in (191 cm)
- Weight: 235 lb (107 kg)
- Spouse: Paige Dean
- Children: 2

Career
- Sport: Golf
- College: University of Georgia
- Turned professional: 2016
- Current tours: PGA Tour; European Tour
- Former tours: Korn Ferry Tour; PGA Tour Canada
- Professional wins: 5
- Highest ranking: 7 (1 June 2025) (as of 25 October 2026)

Number of wins by tour
- PGA Tour: 4
- Korn Ferry Tour: 1

Best results in major championships
- Masters Tournament: T16: 2024
- PGA Championship: T7: 2023
- U.S. Open: T28: 2019
- The Open Championship: T2: 2023

Josef "Sepp" Straka (born 1 May 1993) is an Austrian professional golfer who plays on the PGA Tour and the European Tour. He is the first Austrian golfer to earn a PGA Tour card and the first to win a tournament on the tour, where he has claimed four titles, including the 2022 Honda Classic and the 2025 Truist Championship.

Born in Vienna to an Austrian father and an American mother, Straka moved to the United States at age 14 and played collegiate golf at the University of Georgia alongside his twin brother, Sam. After turning professional in 2016, he claimed his first professional victory at the 2018 KC Golf Classic on the Web.com Tour before securing full PGA Tour status.

A prominent figure in international team golf, Straka represented Austria at both the 2020 and 2024 Summer Olympics, and played for Team Europe in their victorious 2023 and 2025 Ryder Cup campaigns. He reached a career-high official world golf ranking of number 7 in June 2025 and secured a runner-up finish at the 2023 Open Championship, marking the best major tournament performance by an Austrian in golf history.

== Early life and amateur career ==
Straka was born in Vienna, Austria, on 1 May 1993. His mother was American and his father was Austrian; they met when his mother worked at a golf shop in Austria and sold a glove to his father. Straka speaks German and English. Regarding his nationality, he stated in 2022: "I used to say I'm 50% Austrian and 50% American. A friend of mine who is Austrian, Clemens, corrected me one day and said, you are 100% Austrian, 100% American."

Straka has a twin brother, Sam. Both twins played soccer during their youth, until they decided to focus on golf at age 11. Sam was originally the better golfer. The family moved to Valdosta, Georgia, when the twins were aged 14, so his mother could be closer to her family. After the move, their father regularly flew back-and-forth to Austria to maintain his architecture business.

Sepp and his brother attended Lowndes High School in Valdosta, Georgia, where both played for the Lowndes Vikings golf team. As a junior, Sepp won the Austrian Junior Championship and recorded a victory on the Southeastern Junior Golf Tour. Sam won five times on that tour. At the time they committed to the University of Georgia, Sam was ranked No. 44 nationally in the Golfweek/Sagarin Junior Rankings, while Sepp was ranked No. 72. Sepp stated "the UGA coach was interested in Sam and realised only later that he had a brother who could play pretty well."

Straka represented Austria, on the same team as his twin, at the 2011 European Boys' Team Championship. Team Austria finished second (a tied all-time best), losing in the final against the Spanish team led by Jon Rahm.

Straka played collegiate golf at the University of Georgia from 2011 to 2016. He redshirted the 2013–2014 season due to his struggles with short game yips. In March 2016, Straka shot a 7-under 65 in the final round of the Linger Longer Invitational to place second individually, one stroke behind his Georgia teammate Lee McCoy. This was the best individual finish of Straka's collegiate career. The runner-up finish moved him up 80 places to 225th in the World Amateur Golf Ranking. Straka received a Bachelor of Business Administration in management from the University of Georgia's Terry College of Business in 2015.

== Professional career ==
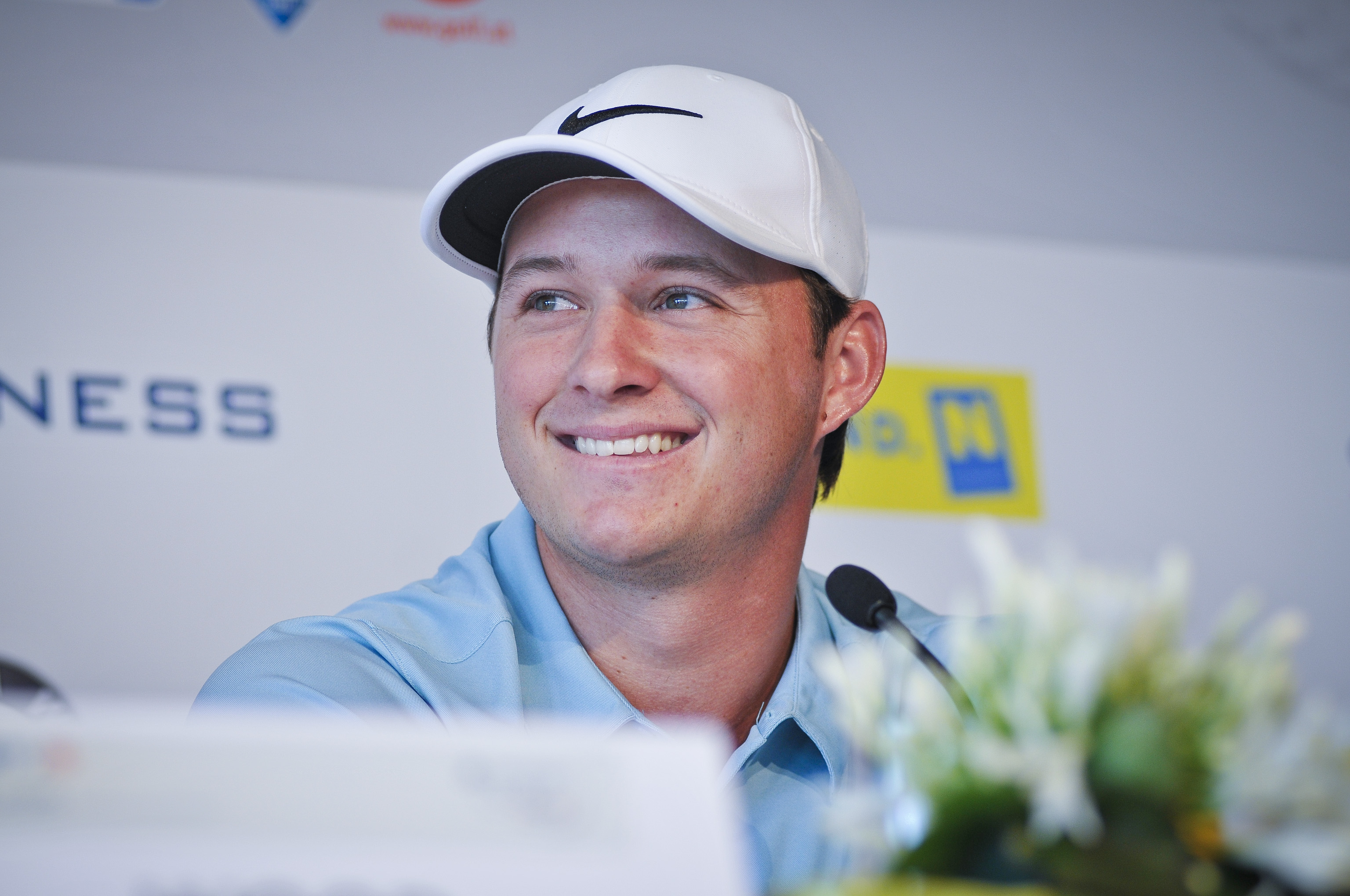
Straka in 2016 at the Austrian Open

Straka turned professional after completing college and played a number of tournaments on the 2016 PGA Tour Canada. He qualified for the 2017 Web.com Tour season. His best finish in 25 events was 7th in the El Bosque Mexico Championship.

Straka became the first Austrian golfer to earn a PGA Tour card after finishing tied for 3rd place in the 2018 Web.com Tour Championship. Earlier in the year, Straka secured his first professional victory by winning the Web.com Tour's KC Golf Classic by one stroke.

In his first season on the PGA Tour, Straka's best finish was a 3rd place at the 2019 Barbasol Championship, the alternate event to the 2019 Open Championship. Straka also played in his first career major championship at the 2019 U.S. Open, after finishing tied for the lowest score at the sectional qualifying in Milton, Ontario. An opening round of 68 left Straka in a tie for 8th, and though two over-par rounds would follow, a final round of 67 left Straka in a tie for 28th place. Straka finished the regular PGA Tour in 107th place on the FedEx Cup rankings, to qualify him for the 2019 FedEx Cup Playoffs and ensure he would keep his card for the 2020 season.

Straka competed in the Men's individual event at the 2020 Summer Olympics, finishing tied for 10th overall.

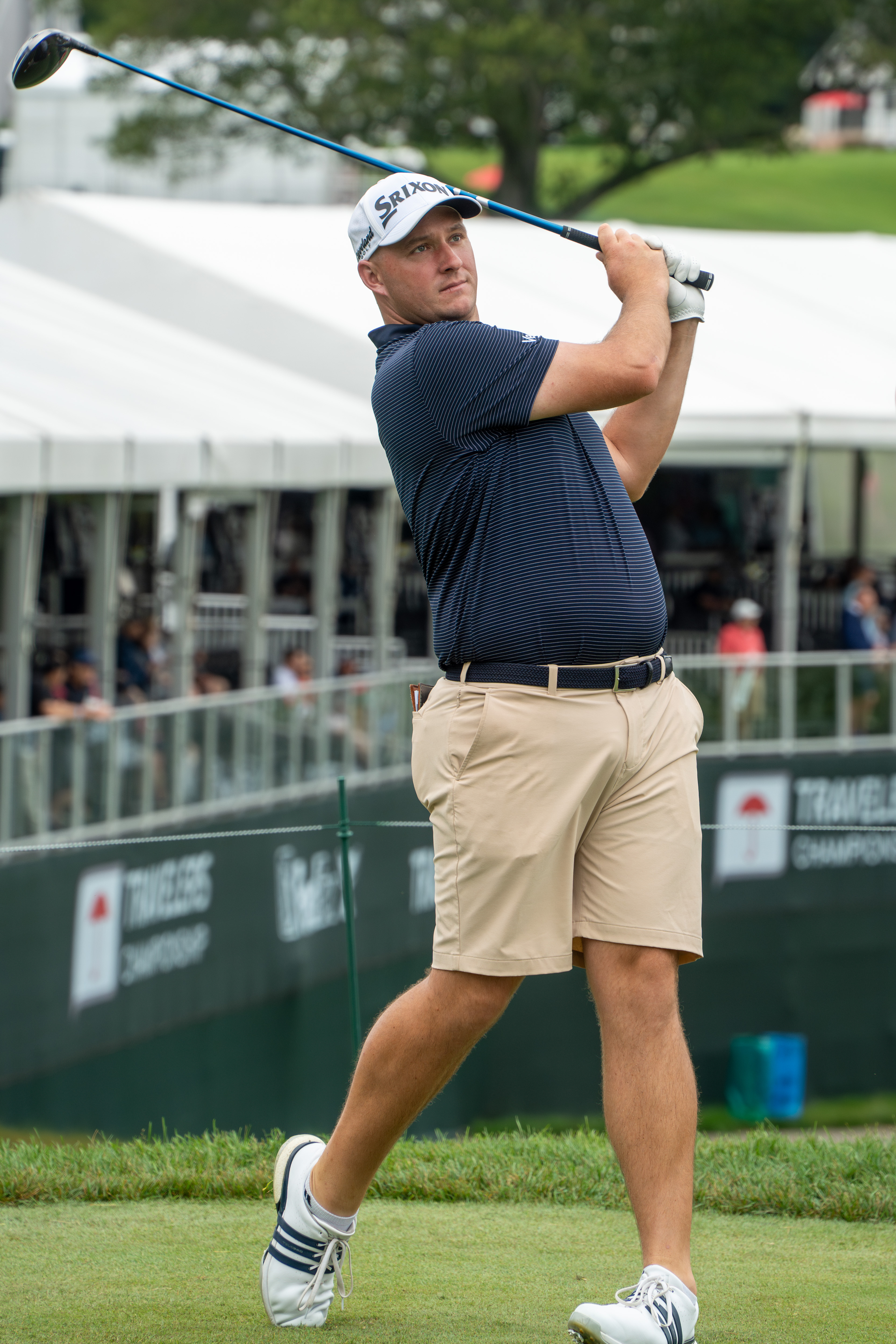
Sepp Straka during the 2025 Travelers Championship

In February 2022, Straka became the first Austrian to win on the PGA Tour when he won The Honda Classic in Palm Beach Gardens, Florida. He shot a final round 66 to win by one shot over Shane Lowry. In August 2022, Straka tied for the lead with Will Zalatoris after 72 holes at the FedEx St. Jude Championship; on the third sudden-death playoff hole, he hit his tee shot into the water, and Zalatoris prevailed with a bogey.

Early in the 2022–23 PGA Tour season, at the Sanderson Farms Championship, Straka lost another sudden-death playoff, this time to Mackenzie Hughes. In July 2023, Straka won the John Deere Classic for his second win on the tour. Following this, Straka finished a joint second in The Open Championship to Brian Harman, six shots back, marking his best finish in a major to date.

In September 2023, Straka played on the European team in the 2023 Ryder Cup at Marco Simone Golf and Country Club in Guidonia, Rome, Italy. The European team won 16.5–11.5 and Straka went 1–2–0 including a loss in his Sunday singles match against Justin Thomas.

In January 2025, Straka won The American Express by two shots over Justin Thomas.

In May 2025, Straka won the Truist Championship at Philadelphia Cricket Club for his second victory of the PGA Tour season.

== Personal life ==
During his time at the University of Georgia, Straka was nicknamed "Ox" in reference to his large size at 6 feet 3 inches (1.91 m), 220 pounds (100 kg), and his resemblance to John Candy's character Dewey Oxberger in the film Stripes.

Straka's wife, Paige, attended Auburn University, and they met at the Auburn Sky Bar during an Auburn–Georgia football game. They married in 2021 and had their first child, a son, in 2023. They had a second child in 2025.

== Professional wins (5) ==
=== PGA Tour wins (4) ===
Legend
Signature events (1)
Other PGA Tour (3)

No.	Date	Tournament	Winning score	Margin of victory	Runner(s)-up
1	27 Feb 2022	The Honda Classic	−10 (71-64-69-66=270)	1 stroke	(Republic of Ireland) Shane Lowry
2	9 Jul 2023	John Deere Classic	−21 (73-63-65-62=263)	2 strokes	(United States) Alex Smalley, (United States) Brendon Todd
3	19 Jan 2025	The American Express	−25 (65-64-64-70=263)	2 strokes	(United States) Justin Thomas
4	11 May 2025	Truist Championship	−16 (63-67-66-68=264)	2 strokes	(Republic of Ireland) Shane Lowry, (United States) Justin Thomas

PGA Tour playoff record (0–2)

No.	Year	Tournament	Opponent	Result
1	2022	FedEx St. Jude Championship	(United States) Will Zalatoris	Lost to bogey on third extra hole
2	2022	Sanderson Farms Championship	(Canada) Mackenzie Hughes	Lost to birdie on second extra hole

=== Web.com Tour wins (1) ===
No.	Date	Tournament	Winning score	Margin of victory	Runner-up
1	5 Aug 2018	KC Golf Classic	−22 (64-65-64-69=262)	1 stroke	(United States) Kyle Jones

== Results in major championships ==
Results not in chronological order in 2020.

Tournament	2019	2020	2021	2022	2023	2024	2025	2026
Masters Tournament				T30	T46	T16	CUT	T41
PGA Championship		T66		78	T7	CUT	CUT	CUT
U.S. Open	T28			CUT	CUT	T56	CUT	CUT
The Open Championship		NT		CUT	T2	T22	T52	T67

Top 10
Did not play

CUT = missed the half-way cut
"T" = tied
NT = no tournament due to COVID-19 pandemic

=== Summary ===
Tournament	Wins	2nd	3rd	Top-5	Top-10	Top-25	Events	Cuts made
Masters Tournament	0	0	0	0	0	1	5	4
PGA Championship	0	0	0	0	1	1	6	3
U.S. Open	0	0	0	0	0	0	6	2
The Open Championship	0	1	0	1	1	2	5	4
Totals	0	1	0	1	2	4	22	13

- Most consecutive cuts made – 4 (2019 U.S. Open – 2022 PGA)
- Longest streak of top-10s – 1 (twice)

== Results in The Players Championship ==
Tournament	2021	2022	2023	2024	2025	2026
The Players Championship	CUT	T9	T65	T16	T14	T8

Top 10

CUT = missed the halfway cut
"T" indicates a tie for a place

== Results in World Golf Championships ==
Tournament	2022	2023
Match Play	T35	T59
Champions	NT^{1}	

^{1}Cancelled due to the COVID-19 pandemic
"T" = Tied
NT = No tournament
Note that the Champions was discontinued from 2023.

== Team appearances ==
Amateur

- European Boys' Team Championship (representing Austria): 2011

Professional

- Hero Cup (representing Continental Europe): 2023 (winners)
- Ryder Cup (representing Europe): 2023 (winners), 2025 (winners)

Ryder Cup points record
2023	2025	Total
1	1	2

== See also ==
- 2018 Web.com Tour Finals graduates
