= Christo Lamprecht =

South African professional golfer (born 2001)

Personal information
- Nationality: South Africa
- Born: 30 January 2001 (age 25) George, Western Cape, South Africa
- Height: 6 ft 8 in (203 cm)
- Weight: 220 lb (100 kg)

Career
- Sport: Golf
- College: Georgia Tech
- Turned professional: 2024
- Current tour: PGA Tour
- Former tour: Korn Ferry Tour
- Professional wins: 1

Number of wins by tour
- Korn Ferry Tour: 1

Best results in major championships
- Masters Tournament: CUT: 2024
- PGA Championship: DNP
- U.S. Open: DNP
- The Open Championship: T74: 2023

Achievements and awards
- Georgia Tech Athletic Association Male Athlete of the Year: 2024
- Atlantic Coast Conference Player of the Year: 2024
- Atlantic Coast Conference Scholar-Athlete of the Year: 2024
- Byron Nelson Award: 2024

Christo Lamprecht (born 30 January 2001) is a South African professional golfer. In 2023, he became the third South African in six years to win The Amateur Championship, giving him exemption to the 2023 Open Championship, where he won the Silver Medal as low amateur. In September 2023, he rose to number 1 in the World Amateur Golf Ranking. He is noted for his height of 6 feet 8 inches (2.03 m).

== Early life and education ==
On 30 January 2001, Lamprecht was born in Western Cape, South Africa the youngest of three with two older sisters. His father introduced him to golf at age three and he attended Outeniqua High School. Lamprecht is of German descent through his great-grandfather who moved from Germany to George, South Africa, where he became the town's first doctor, dentist and pharmacist. Lamprecht's height is common among his family; he stated his father is 6 feet 4 inches (1.93 m) and his great-grandfather was around 7 feet (2.13 m).

== Amateur career ==
Lamprecht had a successful amateur career and became the youngest player ever to win the South African Amateur Championship in 2017. He competed in the Junior Presidents Cup in 2017 and 2019. In 2018, he became the first international champion of the East of Ireland Amateur, tied for eighth at the St Andrews Links Trophy, and tied for 11th place at the Junior Players Championship in Jacksonville, Florida. In 2019, he was runner-up at the Southern Cape Amateur Open and the All Africa Juniors Challenge, and won the Junior Golf World Cup in Japan with the South African team.

He appeared four times at the South African Open Championship and was the youngest player in the field when he made his debut in 2018.

Lamprecht was enrolled as a business administration major at Georgia Tech between 2020 and 2024, and played with the Georgia Tech Yellow Jackets men's golf team, where he became an All-American and multiple time Arnold Palmer Cup player. With one victory and three runner-up finishes in 2022–23, he was ranked 10th nationally by Golfstat and 5th in the Golfweek/Sagarin Index, and a semifinalist for the Ben Hogan Award. In 2023–24, he was ranked 4th nationally in the Scoreboard NCAA Golf rankings, was a finalist for the Ben Hogan Award, Fred Haskins Award, Jack Nicklaus Award and won the Byron Nelson Award. He was also named GTAA Male Athlete of the Year and ACC Player of the Year.

In 2021, he tied for 4th at The Spirit International Amateur Golf Championship in Trinity, Texas, where he captained the South African team finishing eighth overall and fifth in the men's event. Lamprecht competed at the 2022 Arnold Palmer Cup in Switzerland, where he went 3–1 in his matches to help the International team defeat Team USA. At the 2023 Arnold Palmer Cup in Pennsylvania, he lost three of his four matches.

Lamprecht tied for sixth place in the 36-hole stroke-play portion at the 2022 U.S. Amateur, and tied for ninth at the European Amateur Championship in Valencia, Spain. In 2023, he won The Amateur Championship at Hillside Golf Club in England, securing a 3 and 2 victory over Ronan Kleu from Switzerland in the 36-hole final. Afterwards, he rose to 3rd in the World Amateur Golf Ranking, and climbed into the number one spot a few months later.

== Professional career ==
Lamprecht turned professional in May 2024, forfeiting his exemption into the 2024 U.S. Open. He joined the Korn Ferry Tour, for which he gained exemption through finishing second in the PGA Tour University Ranking. He tied for 5th in his fourth start, and was runner-up at the 2025 Astara Golf Championship.

In December 2024, Lamprecht was runner-up at the AfrAsia Bank Mauritius Open on the European Tour.

In August 2025, Lamprecht claimed his first professional victory at the Pinnacle Bank Championship on the Korn Ferry Tour.

== Amateur wins ==
- 2016 Dimension Data Junior Open
- 2017 South African Amateur Championship
- 2018 East of Ireland Amateur Open Championship, Dimension Data Junior Open
- 2020 Cape Province Open
- 2022 Inverness Intercollegiate
- 2023 The Amateur Championship, OFCC Fighting Illini Invitational

== Professional wins (1) ==
=== Korn Ferry Tour wins (1) ===
No.	Date	Tournament	Winning score	Margin of victory	Runner-up
1	10 Aug 2025	Pinnacle Bank Championship	−19 (67-67-65-66=265)	1 stroke	(United States) Peter Kuest

== Results in major championships ==
Tournament	2023	2024
Masters Tournament		CUT
PGA Championship		
U.S. Open		
The Open Championship	T74LA	

Did not play

CUT = missed the half-way cut
"T" = Tied
LA = Low amateur

== Team appearances ==
- Junior Golf World Cup (representing South Africa): 2017, 2019 (winners)
- Junior Presidents Cup (representing the International team): 2017, 2019
- Spirit International (representing South Africa): 2021
- Eisenhower Trophy (representing South Africa): 2022, 2023
- Arnold Palmer Cup (representing the International team): 2022 (winners), 2023

== See also ==
- 2025 Korn Ferry Tour graduates
