= Akshay Bhatia =

American professional golfer (born 2002)

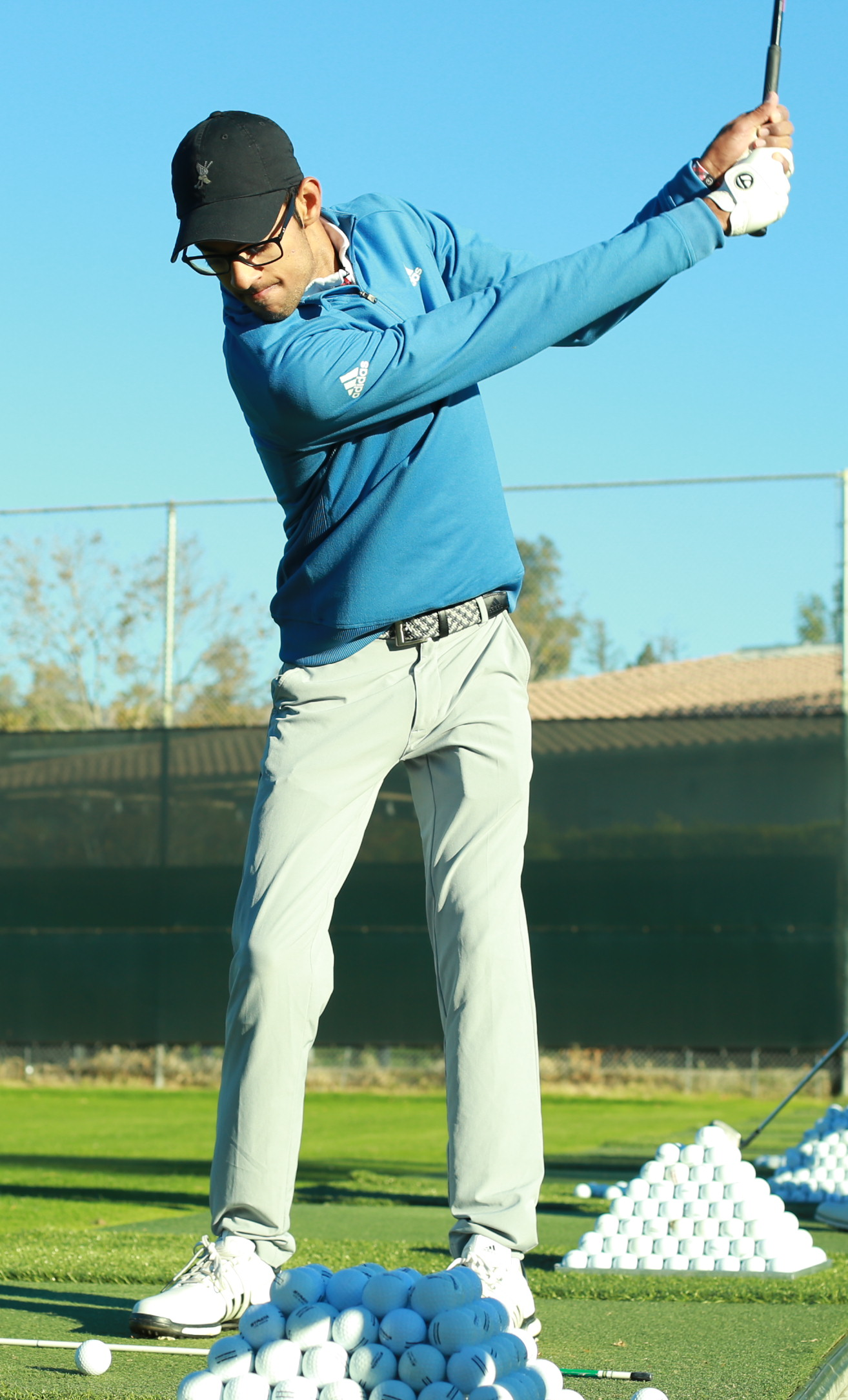
- Bhatia in 2018

Personal information
- Nationality: United States
- Born: January 31, 2002 (age 24) Northridge, California, U.S.
- Height: 6 ft 1 in (1.85 m)
- Weight: 130 lb (59 kg; 9.3 st)
- Spouse: Presleigh Schultz (m. 2025)

Career
- Sport: Golf
- Turned professional: 2019
- Current tour: PGA Tour
- Former tours: Korn Ferry Tour; PGA Tour Canada
- Professional wins: 7
- Highest ranking: 19 (March 8, 2026) (as of November 15, 2026)

Number of wins by tour
- PGA Tour: 3
- European Tour: 1
- Korn Ferry Tour: 1
- Other: 3

Best results in major championships
- Masters Tournament: T35: 2024
- PGA Championship: CUT: 2024, 2025, 2026
- U.S. Open: T16: 2024
- The Open Championship: T30: 2025
Medal record
Men's golf
Representing United States
Youth Olympic Games
Silver medal – second place	2018 Buenos Aires	Boys' individual
Silver medal – second place	2018 Buenos Aires	Mixed team

Akshay Bhatia (born January 31, 2002) is an American professional golfer. He made his first PGA Tour start in 2019 at the age of 17 after receiving a sponsor exemption into Valspar Championship. He turned pro later that year and made his professional debut at Sanderson Farms Championship that fall.

A decorated amateur, Bhatia has represented the United States at the Junior Presidents Cup in 2017, Junior Ryder Cup in 2018, and Walker Cup in 2019, becoming the youngest and first ever high schooler to represent the United States in the event. He has also represented the United States at the 2018 Summer Youth Olympics in Buenos Aires, winning two silver medals. Bhatia made the finals of the Drive, Chip & Putt competition at Augusta National in 2014 and became its first ever finalist to reach the Masters Tournament by virtue of his win at the Valero Texas Open in 2024.

== Early life ==
Bhatia was born in Northridge, California, to parents Sonny and Renu. Bhatia's parents are from India and lived in Delhi before moving to the United States. The family moved to Wake Forest, North Carolina, in 2011. Bhatia has two sisters: Rhea, who played college golf at Queen's University of Charlotte, and Nikitta, who lives in Texas with her husband and two daughters.

== Amateur career ==
He was runner-up at the 2018 U.S. Junior Amateur, losing to Michael Thorbjornsen in the final. He won two silver medals at the 2018 Summer Youth Olympics in the boy's individual and the mixed team with Lucy Li. He played on the Junior Presidents Cup team in 2017 and Junior Ryder Cup in 2018, with both teams winning.

Bhatia made his PGA Tour debut at the 2019 Valspar Championship on a sponsor exemption and missed the cut.

Bhatia made his Web.com Tour debut on April 18, 2019, at the Robert Trent Jones Golf Trail Championship, where he made the cut and finished T-42.

== Professional career ==
Bhatia turned professional in September 2019 after competing in the 2019 Walker Cup, and made his professional debut at the Sanderson Farms Championship.

On August 5, 2020, Bhatia won the ST 11 @ Old South Golf, an event on the Swing Thought Tour, by three strokes. On February 25, 2021, Bhatia won his second Swing Thought Tour event, ST 12 @ Brunswick, in a playoff. On May 29, Bhatia won the 2021 Biggs Classic, a GProTour event.

In June 2021, Bhatia qualified for the U.S. Open at Torrey Pines. He made the cut and finished tied for 57th in his first major championship appearance.

In January 2022, Bhatia won The Bahamas Great Exuma Classic on the Korn Ferry Tour. This was his first start as a member of the Korn Ferry Tour. Despite the strong start, Bhatia fell short of earning a PGA Tour card, finishing 30th (the top 25 earned PGA Tour cards) during the regular season and not making a cut during the Finals.

Bhatia earned Special Temporary Member status on the PGA Tour after a runner-up finish at the 2023 Puerto Rico Open.

In July 2023, he earned his first PGA Tour and first European Tour victory by winning in a playoff at the Barracuda Championship.

In April 2024, Bhatia won the Valero Texas Open in a playoff over Denny McCarthy. Almost two years later, he won the 2026 Arnold Palmer Invitational for his third PGA Tour win, and his first at a Signature Event.

== Amateur wins ==
- 2016 AJGA – CJGT Junior at Yorba Linda, IZOD AJGA Championship
- 2017 Davis Love III Junior Open, Junior PGA Championship, AJGA Junior at Ford's Colony
- 2018 Junior Invitational at Sage Valley, Polo Golf Junior Classic, Junior PGA Championship, Rolex Tournament of Champions
- 2019 Jones Cup Invitational, Dustin Johnson World Junior Championship

== Professional wins (7) ==
=== PGA Tour wins (3) ===
Legend
Signature events (1)
Other PGA Tour (2)

No.	Date	Tournament	Winning score	Margin of victory	Runner-up
1	Jul 23, 2023	Barracuda Championship^{1}	40 pts (6-8-17-9=40)	Playoff	(United States) Patrick Rodgers
2	Apr 7, 2024	Valero Texas Open	−20 (63-70-68-67=268)	Playoff	(United States) Denny McCarthy
3	Mar 8, 2026	Arnold Palmer Invitational	−15 (70-66-68-69=273)	Playoff	(United States) Daniel Berger

^{1}Co-sanctioned by the European Tour

PGA Tour playoff record (3–0)

No.	Year	Tournament	Opponent	Result
1	2023	Barracuda Championship	(United States) Patrick Rodgers	Won with par on first extra hole
2	2024	Valero Texas Open	(United States) Denny McCarthy	Won with birdie on first extra hole
3	2026	Arnold Palmer Invitational	(United States) Daniel Berger	Won with par on first extra hole

=== Korn Ferry Tour wins (1) ===
No.	Date	Tournament	Winning score	Margin of victory	Runner-up
1	Jan 19, 2022	The Bahamas Great Exuma Classic	−14 (69-72-68-65=274)	2 strokes	(United States) Paul Haley II

=== Swing Thought Tour wins (2) ===
- 2020 ST 11 @ Old South Golf
- 2021 ST 12 @ Brunswick

=== GProTour wins (1) ===
- 2021 Biggs Classic

== Results in major championships ==
Tournament	2021	2022	2023	2024	2025	2026
Masters Tournament				T35	T42	CUT
PGA Championship				CUT	CUT	CUT
U.S. Open	T57			T16	CUT	T17
The Open Championship				CUT	T30	CUT

Did not play

CUT = missed the half-way cut
"T" = tied

=== Summary ===
Tournament	Wins	2nd	3rd	Top-5	Top-10	Top-25	Events	Cuts made
Masters Tournament	0	0	0	0	0	0	3	2
PGA Championship	0	0	0	0	0	0	3	0
U.S. Open	0	0	0	0	0	2	4	3
The Open Championship	0	0	0	0	0	0	3	1
Totals	0	0	0	0	0	2	13	6

- Most consecutive cuts made – 2 (2021 U.S. Open – 2024 Masters)
- Longest streak of top-10s – none

== Results in The Players Championship ==
Tournament	2024	2025	2026
The Players Championship	CUT	T3	T13

Top 10

CUT = missed the half-way cut
"T" indicates a tie for a place

== U.S. national team appearances ==
- Junior Presidents Cup: 2017 (winners)
- Junior Ryder Cup: 2018 (winners)
- Summer Youth Olympics Mixed team event: 2018
- Walker Cup: 2019 (winners)
