= 2023 Open Championship =

151st Open Championship

Tournament information
- Dates: 20–23 July 2023
- Location: Hoylake, Merseyside, England; 53.385°N 3.190°W
- Course: Royal Liverpool Golf Club
- Organized by: The R&A
- Tours: European Tour; PGA Tour; Japan Golf Tour

Statistics
- Par: 71
- Length: 7,383 yd (6,751 m)
- Field: 156 players, 76 after cut
- Cut: 145 (+3)
- Prize fund: US$16,500,000
- Winner's share: $3,000,000

Champion
- (United States) Brian Harman
- 271 (−13)
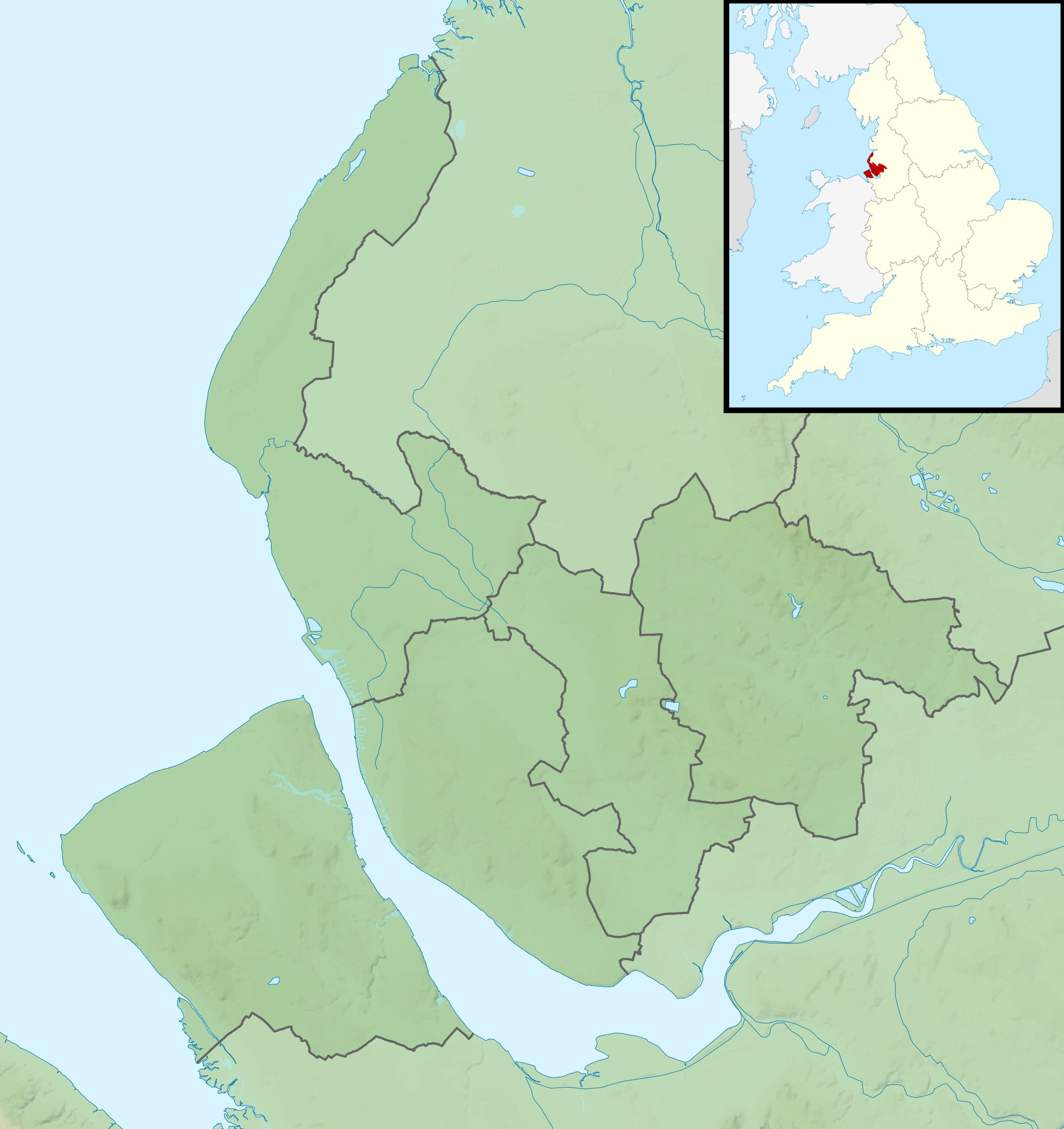
- Location in the United Kingdom Location in England Location in Merseyside

The 2023 Open Championship, officially the 151st Open Championship, was a golf tournament played from 20–23 July 2023 at Royal Liverpool Golf Club in Hoylake, Merseyside, England. This was the 13th time that The Open was played at Royal Liverpool.

Brian Harman won his first career Open Championship by six shots over Jason Day, Tom Kim, Jon Rahm, and Sepp Straka. It was Harman's first career major championship and his first PGA Tour win in six years.

== Organisation ==
The 2023 Open Championship was organized by the R&A, and was included in the PGA Tour, European Tour, and Japan Golf Tour calendars under the major championships category. The tournament was a 72-hole (4 rounds) stroke play competition held over 4 days, with 18 holes played each day. Play was in groups of three for the first two days, and groups of two in the final two days. Groupings for the first two days were decided by the organizers, with each group having one morning and one afternoon tee time. On the final two days, players teed off in reverse order of aggregate score, with the leaders last. After 36 holes there was a cut, after which the top 70 and ties progressed through to compete in the third and fourth rounds. In the event of a tie for the lowest score after four rounds, a three-hole aggregate playoff would have been held to determine the winner; this would have been followed by sudden-death extra holes if necessary until a winner emerges.

== Venue ==
On 7 December 2020, the R&A announced that the Royal Liverpool Golf Club would host the 2023 edition of the Open, and the Royal Troon Golf Club will host the 2024 edition. The 2023 event is the 13th Open Championship played at Royal Liverpool. The most recent was in 2014, when Rory McIlroy won the event by two strokes for his third major title.

The Royal Liverpool Golf Club underwent a number of changes prior to the 2023 Open, including adding the new seventeenth hole, a par 3, lowering the par of the course to 71. Despite the decrease in par, the overall yardage of the course was increased by 71 yards to a total of 7,383 yards. New bunkers were added to holes one, thirteen, fourteen, and sixteen, the green on the fourth hole was reduced in size and modified to allow for harder pin positions, and longer championship tees were added to the seventh, fifteenth, and eighteenth hole.

Hole	Name	Yards	Par	Hole	Name	Yards	Par
1	Royal	459	4	10	Far	507	4
2	Stand	453	4	11	Punch Bowl	392	4
3	Course	426	4	12	Dee	449	4
4	Road	367	4	13	Alps	194	3
5	Long	520	5	14	Hilbre	454	4
6	New	201	3	15	Field	620	5
7	Telegraph	481	4	16	Lake	461	4
8	Briars	436	4	17	Little Eye	136	3
9	Dowie	218	3	18	Dun	609	5
Out		3,561	35	In		3,822	36
Source				Total		7,383	71

Yardage by round

Round	Hole	1	2	3	4	5	6	7	8	9	Out	10	11	12	13	14	15	16	17	18	In	Total
Round	Par	4	4	4	4	5	3	4	4	3	35	4	4	4	3	4	5	4	3	5	36	71
1st	Yards	444	458	424	354	510	204	478	433	200	3,505	506	387	442	195	452	602	466	126	599	3,775	7,280
2nd	Yards	467	442	413	360	528	187	484	430	227	3,538	511	375	432	180	453	616	461	132	596	3,756	7,294
3rd	Yards	446	458	419	370	510	196	484	424	205	3,512	484	395	446	185	443	625	462	120	615	3,775	7,287
Final	Yards	465	458	428	366	527	194	469	430	223	3,560	497	402	433	203	459	607	471	132	609	3,813	7,373

== Field ==
The Open Championship field is made up of 156 players, who gained entry through various exemption criteria and qualifying tournaments. The criteria included past Open champions, recent major winners, top ranked players in the world rankings and from the leading world tours, and winners and high finishers from various designated tournaments, including the Open Qualifying Series; the winners of designated amateur events, including The Amateur Championship and U.S. Amateur, also gained exemption provided they remain an amateur. Anyone not qualifying via exemption, and had a handicap of 0.4 or lower, can gain entry through regional and final qualifying events.

Most exemption criteria remained unchanged from previous years; changes included the removal of exemptions for recent Ryder Cup and Presidents Cup players, and a new exemption for amateur golfers.

== Round summaries ==
=== First round ===
Thursday, 20 July 2023

Tommy Fleetwood, who grew up just 20 miles from Royal Liverpool, made three straight birdies on the back nine and only one bogey in a five-under round of 66 to share the lead after the first round.

Amateur Christo Lamprecht chipped in for birdie at the par-4 14th hole and two-putted for birdie on the par-5 18th hole to tie Fleetwood for the first-round lead. His 66 was the lowest score by an amateur in the first round of the Open Championship since Tom Lewis in 2011. They were joined atop the leaderboard by Emiliano Grillo, who birdied five of his last eight holes.

Brian Harman holed a 30-foot birdie putt on the 18th to finish at four-under 67 and part of a group tied for fourth place, along with Adrián Otaegui and Antoine Rozner. Reigning U.S. Open champion Wyndham Clark began his round with nine straight pars but made four birdies on the back nine to shoot 68 (−3) and end up in a tie for seventh place along with 2009 champion Stewart Cink and Max Homa.

Defending champion Cameron Smith made five bogeys in a one-over round of 72. Rory McIlroy, who won the last time the tournament was held at this course, was two-over on his round before consecutive birdies on holes 14–15. He saved par after having to play backwards from a greenside bunker on the 18th to shoot even-par 71.

Place	Player	Score	To par
T1	(England) Tommy Fleetwood	66	−5
T1	(Argentina) Emiliano Grillo	66	−5
T1	(South Africa) Christo Lamprecht (a)	66	−5
T4	(United States) Brian Harman	67	−4
T4	(Spain) Adrián Otaegui	67	−4
T4	(France) Antoine Rozner	67	−4
T7	(United States) Stewart Cink	68	−3
T7	(United States) Wyndham Clark	68	−3
T7	(United States) Max Homa	68	−3
T7	(Sweden) Alex Norén	68	−3
T7	(India) Shubhankar Sharma	68	−3
T7	(Scotland) Michael Stewart	68	−3

=== Second round ===
Friday, 21 July 2023

Brian Harman birdied four straight holes on his front nine, then made 12 pars before holing a 15-foot eagle putt on the par-5 18th hole to shoot a bogey-free round of 65 (−6). Harman's five-shot lead tied the largest after 36 holes at the Open Championship since 1934.

Tommy Fleetwood, who began the round in a three-way tie for the lead, was one over through nine holes before making a 58-foot birdie putt on the 10th hole. He made two more birdies on the back nine along with two bogeys to shoot an even-par 71 and finish alone in second place behind Harman. Sepp Straka finished his round with six birdies over his last seven holes and moved up to sole possession of third place with a round of 67 (−4). Amateur Christo Lamprecht, tied for the lead at the start of the round, bogeyed five of his first seven holes and did not make a birdie in an eight-over round of 79 to fall to a tie for 61st place.

The cut came at 145 (+3). Notables to miss the cut included 2021 champion Collin Morikawa, 2019 champion Shane Lowry, 2013 champion Phil Mickelson, and two-time major champions Dustin Johnson and Justin Thomas.

Place	Player	Score	To par
1	(United States) Brian Harman	67-65=132	−10
2	(England) Tommy Fleetwood	66-71=137	−5
3	(Austria) Sepp Straka	71-67=138	−4
T4	(Australia) Jason Day	72-67=139	−3
T4	(Australia) Min Woo Lee	71-68=139	−3
T4	(India) Shubhankar Sharma	68-71=139	−3
T7	(Argentina) Emiliano Grillo	66-74=140	−2
T7	(Spain) Adrián Otaegui	67-73=140	−2
T7	(United States) Jordan Spieth	69-71=140	−2
T7	(United States) Cameron Young	72-68=140	−2

=== Third round ===
Saturday, 22 July 2023

Brian Harman began the round with a five-shot lead but bogeyed two of his first four holes to cut his advantage to two shots. He then made four birdies the rest of his round, including a 20-foot putt on the 12th hole to reach 12 under for the tournament, to shoot a two-under 69 and move back in front by five shots heading to the final round.

Cameron Young holed a 30-foot birdie putt to open his round and made five more birdies, including both par 5s on the back nine, shooting 66 (−5) to finish alone in second place at seven under. Jon Rahm began the round in 39th place and 12 shots off the lead but made four straight birdies making the turn, playing the back nine in six under for a round of 63 (−8) and moving up to third place, six shots behind Harman. His 63 was the lowest round in an Open Championship at Royal Liverpool by two shots.

Tommy Fleetwood, playing in the final group with Harman, birdied the second hole to get within two shots of the lead but didn't make another birdie the rest of his round, shooting an even-par 71 to fall into a tie for fourth place with Jason Day, Viktor Hovland, Antoine Rozner, and Sepp Straka, seven shots back.

Place	Player	Score	To par
1	(United States) Brian Harman	67-65-69=201	−12
2	(United States) Cameron Young	72-68-66=206	−7
3	(Spain) Jon Rahm	74-70-63=207	−6
T4	(Australia) Jason Day	72-67-69=208	−5
T4	(England) Tommy Fleetwood	66-71-71=208	−5
T4	(Norway) Viktor Hovland	70-72-66=208	−5
T4	(France) Antoine Rozner	67-74-67=208	−5
T4	(Austria) Sepp Straka	71-67-70=208	−5
T9	(England) Alex Fitzpatrick	74-70-65=209	−4
T9	(India) Shubhankar Sharma	68-71-70=209	−4

=== Final round ===
Sunday, 23 July 2023

==== Summary ====
Brian Harman shot a one-under 70 to win his first career Open Championship and major championship by six shots.

Harman began the round with a five-shot lead but bogeyed the par-5 fifth hole after taking a drop from thick bushes off the tee, his second bogey of the round that cut his lead to just three shots. He rebounded with birdies on his next two holes, including from 23 feet on the seventh hole, to reopen his five-shot advantage. After another bogey at the 13th, Harman holed a 40-foot birdie putt on the 14th and got up and down for birdie on the par-5 15th to reach 13-under for the tournament. He parred his last three holes, playing out of a greenside bunker to seven feet on the 18th and making the putt to clinch the title.

A group of four players finished at seven under and tied for second place. Tom Kim, playing with a sprained ankle he suffered earlier in the week, eagled the fifth hole after reaching the green in two shots as part of a four-under round of 67. Sepp Straka was three under on his round and alone in second place until a closing bogey at the 18th gave him a 69 (−2). Jon Rahm made a 23-foot birdie putt on the 18th to shoot 70 (−1), while Jason Day holed out for birdie from the rough on the ninth and added another birdie at the 15th for a 69.

Rory McIlroy, the 2014 Open champion at Royal Liverpool, birdied three consecutive holes on his front nine to get within four shots of Harman's lead but was even par the rest of his round, finishing at six under and tied for sixth place with Emiliano Grillo. Cameron Young, playing in the final group with Harman, was three over on his round until a birdie at the 18th gave him a 73 (+2), dropping him into a tie for eighth place. Matthew Jordan, a member at Royal Liverpool, hit his approach on the 18th to six feet and made the birdie putt to finish at four under and in a tie for 10th place.

==== Final leaderboard ====
Champion
Silver Medal winner (low amateur)
(a) = amateur
(c) = past champion

Top 10
Place	Player	Score	To par	Money ($)
1	(United States) Brian Harman	67-65-69-70=271	−13	3,000,000
T2	(Australia) Jason Day	72-67-69-69=277	−7	1,084,625
T2	(South Korea) Tom Kim	74-68-68-67=277	−7	1,084,625
T2	(Spain) Jon Rahm	74-70-63-70=277	−7	1,084,625
T2	(Austria) Sepp Straka	71-67-70-69=277	−7	1,084,625
T6	(Argentina) Emiliano Grillo	66-74-70-68=278	−6	551,250
T6	(Northern Ireland) Rory McIlroy (c)	71-70-69-68=278	−6	551,250
T8	(India) Shubhankar Sharma	68-71-70-70=279	−5	403,350
T8	(United States) Cameron Young	72-68-66-73=279	−5	403,350
T10	(England) Tommy Fleetwood	66-71-71-72=280	−4	308,400
T10	(United States) Max Homa	68-73-70-69=280	−4	308,400
T10	(England) Matthew Jordan	69-72-69-70=280	−4	308,400

Leaderboard below the top 10
Place	Player	Score	To par	Money ($)
T13	(Belgium) Thomas Detry	74-69-67-71=281	−3	241,633
T13	(Norway) Viktor Hovland	70-71-66-73=281	−3	241,633
T13	(Japan) Hideki Matsuyama	70-72-69-70=281	−3	241,633
T13	(Sweden) Henrik Stenson (c)	73-68-71-69=281	−3	241,633
T17	(England) Laurie Canter	71-70-73-68=282	−2	192,575
T17	(England) Alex Fitzpatrick	74-70-65-73=282	−2	192,575
T17	(United States) Xander Schauffele	70-74-68-70=282	−2	192,575
T20	(England) Tyrrell Hatton	71-73-68-71=283	−1	163,067
T20	(South Korea) Im Sung-jae	70-74-67-72=283	−1	163,067
T20	(France) Antoine Rozner	67-74-67-75=283	−1	163,067
T23	(South Korea) An Byeong-hun	73-70-69-72=284	E	121,490
T23	(United States) Stewart Cink (c)	68-73-71-72=284	E	121,490
T23	(United States) Rickie Fowler	72-73-67-72=284	E	121,490
T23	(Denmark) Nicolai Højgaard	71-70-69-74=284	E	121,490
T23	(Poland) Adrian Meronk	72-71-74-67=284	E	121,490
T23	(Sweden) Alex Norén	68-75-71-70=284	E	121,490
T23	(South Africa) Louis Oosthuizen (c)	74-70-71-69=284	E	121,490
T23	(United States) Scottie Scheffler	70-75-72-67=284	E	121,490
T23	(England) Matthew Southgate	71-70-74-69=284	E	121,490
T23	(United States) Jordan Spieth (c)	69-71-71-73=284	E	121,490
T33	(England) Richard Bland	70-71-71-73=285	+1	84,113
T33	(United States) Patrick Cantlay	70-75-67-73=285	+1	84,113
T33	(United States) Wyndham Clark	68-73-71-73=285	+1	84,113
T33	(France) Romain Langasque	70-74-67-74=285	+1	84,113
T33	(United States) Patrick Reed	70-74-68-73=285	+1	84,113
T33	(Australia) Adam Scott	72-73-71-69=285	+1	84,113
T33	(Australia) Cameron Smith (c)	72-72-68-73=285	+1	84,113
T33	(England) Oliver Wilson	69-74-71-71=285	+1	84,113
T41	(Sweden) Alexander Björk	69-73-70-74=286	+2	58,725
T41	(England) Matt Fitzpatrick	72-72-67-75=286	+2	58,725
T41	(Australia) Min Woo Lee	71-68-72-75=286	+2	58,725
T41	(Germany) Hurly Long	72-72-71-71=286	+2	58,725
T41	(France) Victor Perez	74-71-71-70=286	+2	58,725
T41	(United States) J. T. Poston	71-73-69-73=286	+2	58,725
T41	(Germany) Marcel Siem	71-71-74-70=286	+2	58,725
T41	(England) Jordan Smith	71-72-71-72=286	+2	58,725
T49	(Mexico) Abraham Ancer	72-71-71-73=287	+3	45,933
T49	(South Africa) Christiaan Bezuidenhout	73-71-71-72=287	+3	45,933
T49	(United States) Brendon Todd	74-70-69-74=287	+3	45,933
T52	(Canada) Corey Conners	73-71-68-76=288	+4	43,433
T52	(New Zealand) Ryan Fox	78-67-69-74=288	+4	43,433
T52	(Scotland) Michael Stewart	68-73-71-76=288	+4	43,433
T55	(United States) Zach Johnson (c)	75-69-71-74=289	+5	41,375
T55	(Spain) Adrián Otaegui	67-73-77-72=289	+5	41,375
T55	(United States) Andrew Putnam	73-72-72-71=289	+5	41,375
T55	(United States) Gary Woodland	73-71-73-72=289	+5	41,375
59	(England) Brandon Robinson-Thompson	73-73-73-73=290	+6	40,500
T60	(United States) Bryson DeChambeau	74-70-74-73=291	+7	40,200
T60	(Japan) Rikuya Hoshino	75-69-70-77=291	+7	40,200
T60	(United States) Kurt Kitayama	72-72-72-75=291	+7	40,200
T60	(United States) Scott Stallings	74-71-75-71=291	+7	40,200
T64	(Republic of Ireland) Pádraig Harrington (c)	74-71-73-74=292	+8	39,400
T64	(United States) Brooks Koepka	70-75-72-75=292	+8	39,400
T64	(Italy) Guido Migliozzi	69-72-71-80=292	+8	39,400
T64	(Scotland) Richie Ramsay	73-72-71-76=292	+8	39,400
T68	(Sweden) David Lingmerth	70-75-70-78=293	+9	38,300
T68	(Finland) Sami Välimäki	76-68-70-79=293	+9	38,300
T68	(England) Danny Willett	73-72-75-73=293	+9	38,300
T71	(Netherlands) Joost Luiten	71-72-71-80=294	+10	37,675
T71	(Scotland) Robert MacIntyre	74-71-73-76=294	+10	37,675
T71	(Belgium) Thomas Pieters	70-73-71-80=294	+10	37,675
T74	(South Africa) Christo Lamprecht (a)	66-79-76-74=295	+11	0
T74	(South Africa) Thriston Lawrence	71-70-75-79=295	+11	37,300
76	(United States) Zack Fischer	71-73-75-78=296	+13	37,175
CUT	(United States) Keegan Bradley	70−76=146	+4	
CUT	(United States) Ben Griffin	75−71=146	+4	
CUT	(South Korea) Kang Kyung-nam	78−68=146	+4	
CUT	(Spain) Pablo Larrazábal	72−74=146	+4	
CUT	(United States) Taylor Moore	76−70=146	+4	
CUT	(United States) Collin Morikawa (c)	78−68=146	+4	
CUT	(Republic of Ireland) Séamus Power	78−68=146	+4	
CUT	(Japan) Kazuki Yasumori	73−73=146	+4	
CUT	(Spain) José Luis Ballester (a)	73−74=147	+5	
CUT	(United States) Harris English	75−72=147	+5	
CUT	(Australia) Lucas Herbert	71−76=147	+5	
CUT	(United States) Tom Hoge	72−75=147	+5	
CUT	(Chile) Joaquín Niemann	78−69=147	+5	
CUT	(Germany) Yannik Paul	77−70=147	+5	
CUT	(United States) Sahith Theegala	79−68=147	+5	
CUT	(United States) Sam Burns	73−75=148	+6	
CUT	(United States) Tony Finau	73−75=148	+6	
CUT	(Japan) Kazuki Higa	73−75=148	+6	
CUT	(United States) Billy Horschel	73−75=148	+6	
CUT	(South Korea) Kim Bi-o	74−74=148	+6	
CUT	(United States) Michael Kim	75−73=148	+6	
CUT	(United States) Chris Kirk	78−70=148	+6	
CUT	(South Korea) Lee Kyoung-hoon	75−73=148	+6	
CUT	(Italy) Francesco Molinari (c)	73−75=148	+6	
CUT	(United States) Trey Mullinax	75−73=148	+6	
CUT	(Japan) Keita Nakajima	72−76=148	+6	
CUT	(United States) Davis Riley	78−70=148	+6	
CUT	(England) Justin Rose	73−75=148	+6	
CUT	(Finland) Kalle Samooja	73−75=148	+6	
CUT	(Canada) Nick Taylor	73−75=148	+6	
CUT	(England) Matt Wallace	75−73=148	+6	
CUT	(England) Dan Bradbury	76−73=149	+7	
CUT	(Spain) Nacho Elvira	72−77=149	+7	
CUT	(Scotland) Ewen Ferguson	74−75=149	+7	
CUT	(Argentina) Mateo Fernández de Oliveira (a)	77−72=149	+7	
CUT	(United States) Talor Gooch	74−75=149	+7	
CUT	(United States) Russell Henley	73−76=149	+7	
CUT	(Denmark) Rasmus Højgaard	78−71=149	+7	
CUT	(South Korea) Kim Si-woo	69−80=149	+7	
CUT	(Republic of Ireland) Shane Lowry (c)	72−77=149	+7	
CUT	(South Africa) Charl Schwartzel	77−72=149	+7	
CUT	(South Africa) Ockie Strydom	72−77=149	+7	
CUT	(Scotland) Connor Syme	74−75=149	+7	
CUT	(Northern Ireland) Darren Clarke (c)	73−77=150	+8	
CUT	(United States) Seungsu Han	76−74=150	+8	
CUT	(Denmark) Thorbjørn Olesen	73−77=150	+8	
CUT	(England) Marco Penge	74−76=150	+8	
CUT	(Australia) Travis Smyth	78−72=150	+8	
CUT	(Australia) Haydn Barron	74−77=151	+9	
CUT	(Germany) Tiger Christensen (a)	77−74=151	+9	
CUT	(New Zealand) Daniel Hillier	78−73=151	+9	
CUT	(United States) Phil Mickelson (c)	77−74=151	+9	
CUT	(South Africa) Ernie Els (c)	75−77=152	+10	
CUT	(South Africa) Branden Grace	73−79=152	+10	
CUT	(Republic of Ireland) Alex Maguire (a)	72−80=152	+10	
CUT	(Australia) David Micheluzzi	77−75=152	+10	
CUT	(Japan) Taiga Semikawa	77−75=152	+10	
CUT	(England) Callum Shinkwin	78−74=152	+10	
CUT	(United States) Lee Hodges	76−77=153	+11	
CUT	(Japan) Takumi Kanaya	73−80=153	+11	
CUT	(Australia) Connor McKinney	76−77=153	+11	
CUT	(United States) Justin Thomas	82−71=153	+11	
CUT	(Scotland) Marc Warren	79−74=153	+11	
CUT	(Spain) Alejandro Cañizares	75−79=154	+12	
CUT	(United States) John Daly (c)	77−77=154	+12	
CUT	(Wales) Oliver Farr	74−80=154	+12	
CUT	(United States) Denny McCarthy	76−78=154	+12	
CUT	(Scotland) Graeme Robertson	75−79=154	+12	
CUT	(United States) Adam Schenk	79−75=154	+12	
CUT	(United States) Dustin Johnson	74−81=155	+13	
CUT	(South Africa) Martin Rohwer	73−82=155	+13	
CUT	(South Africa) Kyle Barker	76−80=156	+14	
CUT	(Spain) Jorge Campillo	82−74=156	+14	
CUT	(Australia) Harrison Crowe (a)	76−80=156	+14	
CUT	(Japan) Hiroshi Iwata	77−79=156	+14	
CUT	(Japan) Kensei Hirata	75−81=156	+14	
CUT	(United States) Gunner Wiebe	79−79=158	+16	
CUT	(Hong Kong) Kho Taichi	83−77=160	+18	
CUT	(Spain) Adri Arnaus	82−81=163	+21	
CUT	(Thailand) Jazz Janewattananond	81−83=164	+22	

==== Scorecard ====
Hole	1	2	3	4	5	6	7	8	9	10	11	12	13	14	15	16	17	18
Par	4	4	4	4	5	3	4	4	3	4	4	4	3	4	5	4	3	5
(United States) Harman	−12	−11	−11	−11	−10	−11	−12	−12	−12	−12	−12	−12	−11	−12	−13	−13	−13	−13
(Australia) Day	−5	−5	−4	−4	−5	−5	−4	−5	−6	−6	−6	−6	−6	−6	−7	−7	−7	−7
(South Korea) Kim	−2	−1	−1	−2	−4	−4	−4	−4	−5	−5	−6	−6	−6	−6	−7	−7	−7	−7
(Spain) Rahm	−6	−6	−6	−6	−7	−7	−7	−7	−6	−6	−6	−6	−7	−6	−6	−6	−6	−7
(Austria) Straka	−4	−4	−5	−5	−6	−6	−6	−6	−7	−6	−7	−7	−7	−7	−7	−8	−8	−7
(Northern Ireland) McIlroy	−3	−3	−4	−5	−6	−6	−6	−6	−6	−5	−5	−5	−5	−6	−6	−5	−6	−6
(Argentina) Grillo	−3	−3	−3	−3	−4	−3	−3	−3	−3	−4	−5	−5	−5	−6	−6	−6	−6	−6
(United States) Young	−6	−6	−6	−6	−5	−6	−6	−6	−5	−5	−5	−5	−5	−5	−5	−4	−4	−5

Cumulative tournament scores, relative to par

Eagle	Birdie	Bogey
