= Harold Weber =

American golfer (1882–1933)

Medal record

Olympic Games

Men's Golf
Bronze medal – third place	1904 St. Louis	team

Harold Weber (March 20, 1882 – November 7, 1933) was an American golfer who competed in the 1904 Summer Olympics.

== Early life ==
Weber was from Littleton, New Hampshire.

== Golf career ==
In 1904, he was part of the American team which won the bronze medal. He finished 22nd in this competition. In the individual competition he finished 16th in the qualification and was eliminated in the first round of the match play.

He designed Highland Meadows Golf Course in Sylvania, Ohio in 1925. The course is the site of the LPGA Jamie Farr Owens Corning Classic.

== Major championships ==
Tournament	1902	1903	1904	1905	1906	1907	1908	1909
U.S. Amateur	R64	R16		SF	R32	R16		R16

Tournament	1910	1911	1912	1913	1914	1915	1916	1917	1918	1919
The Amateur Championship				R32	R32	NT	NT	NT	NT	NT
U.S. Amateur	QF		R16		R32	DNQ		NT	NT	

Tournament	1920	1921	1922	1923	1924	1925	1926	1927	1928	1929
U.S. Amateur	R32		DNQ	R32	DNQ	DNQ		DNQ	DNQ	

Tournament	1930	1931	1932
U.S. Amateur		DNQ	DNQ

Note: Weber played in only the U.S. Amateur and The Amateur Championship.

Top 10
Did not play

LA = low amateur
NT = no tournament
"T" indicates a tie for a place
DNQ = did not qualify for match play portion
R256, R128, R64, R32, R16, QF, SF = round in which player lost in match play

Source for 1913 British Amateur: The American Golfer, July, 1913, pg. 225.

Source for 1914 British Amateur: Golf Illustrated, July, 1914, pg. 28.
