= Brian Harman =

American professional golfer (born 1987)

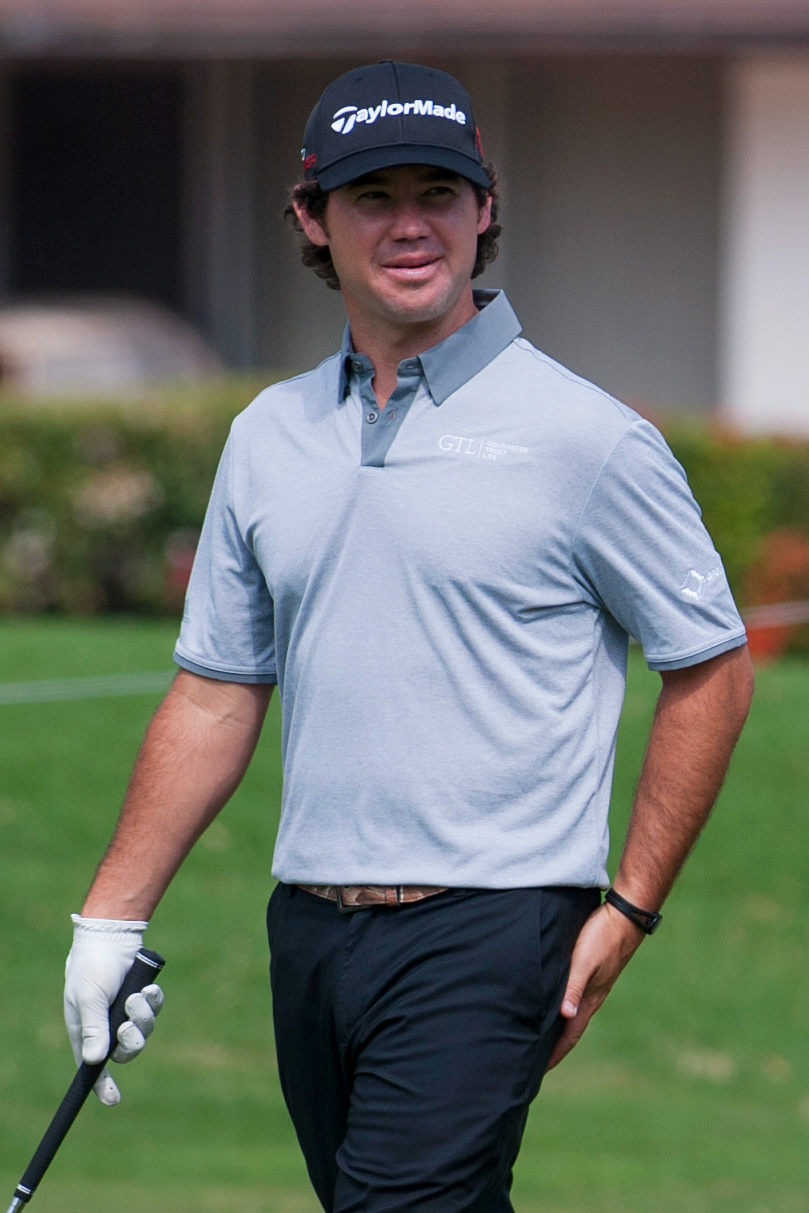
- Harman in 2015

Personal information
- Full name: Brian Eric Harman
- Nickname: The Butcher
- Nationality: United States
- Born: January 19, 1987 (age 39) Savannah, Georgia, U.S.
- Height: 5 ft 7 in (1.70 m)
- Weight: 155 lb (70 kg; 11.1 st)
- Spouse: Kelly Van Slyke (m. 2014)
- Children: 3

Career
- Sport: Golf
- College: University of Georgia
- Turned professional: 2009
- Current tour: PGA Tour
- Former tour: eGolf Professional Tour
- Professional wins: 6
- Highest ranking: 8 (August 13, 2023) (as of October 25, 2026)

Number of wins by tour
- PGA Tour: 4
- European Tour: 1
- Other: 2

Best results in major championships (wins: 1)
- Masters Tournament: T12: 2021
- PGA Championship: T13: 2017
- U.S. Open: T2: 2017
- The Open Championship: Won: 2023

Brian Eric Harman (born January 19, 1987) is an American professional golfer from Savannah, Georgia. He plays on the PGA Tour, on which he has won four tournaments, including a major championship victory at the 2023 Open Championship. He also finished as a runner-up at the 2017 U.S. Open. He plays left-handed.

== Amateur career ==
In 2003, Harman won the U.S. Junior Amateur. He won the Players Amateur in 2005, and the Porter Cup in 2007, shooting a tournament record 22-under-par 258.

Harman played on the winning 2005 and 2009 Walker Cup and 2007 Palmer Cup teams. He was the youngest-ever member of the Walker Cup team when he debuted in 2005.

In college, Harman was a three-time 2nd Team All-American on the University of Georgia golf team. He won the 2005 NCAA Preview and the 2006 Isleworth Invitational. He also won the yearly award for highest grade point average three times. Harman graduated with a Bachelor of Business Administration in finance from UGA's Terry College of Business in 2011.

== Professional career ==
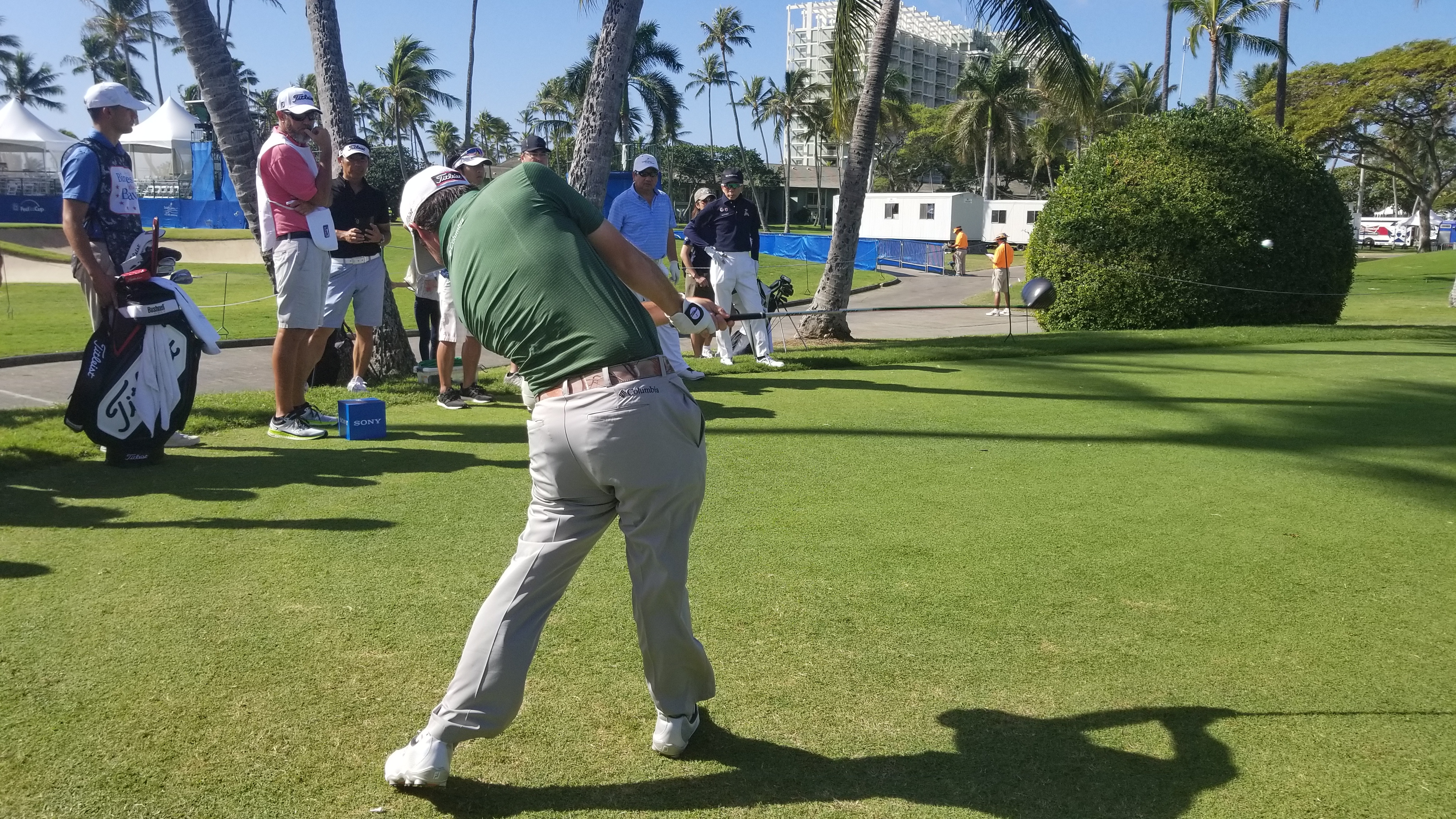
Harman at the 2018 Sony Open in Hawaii.

In 2010, Harman played mostly on the EGolf Professional Tour finishing in the top-10 in 11 of his 14 starts. He gained his first pro victory at the Manor Classic where he won by three shots. He also played in three Nationwide Tour events in 2010. His best showing came at the Stadion Athens Classic at UGA where he placed T-18th on his former college course.

Harman was known for a unique situation at the 2012 Players Championship. He was the first alternate when D. A. Points withdrew just minutes before his tee time. Playing partners Carl Pettersson and Robert Garrigus had already teed off and after consulting with the PGA, tournament officials allowed Harman to tee off alone for the first round. Harman eventually got partnered with Ryan Moore and Bud Cauley for round two after Paul Casey withdrew. Harman made the cut and finished T51.

Harman later qualified for his first major, the 2012 U.S. Open. His first PGA Tour win was the 2014 John Deere Classic. In 2015, Harman held the 54 hole lead at the Travelers Championship, but would miss the playoff, won by Bubba Watson, by one stroke and finished in solo third.

On August 30, 2015, at The Barclays at Plainfield Country Club in Edison, New Jersey, Harman became the third player in PGA Tour history to have two aces in the same round.

On May 7, 2017, Harman won the Wells Fargo Championship held at Eagle Point Golf Club in Wilmington, North Carolina, for his second PGA Tour win. Harman made a 28-foot putt on the 18th hole to win by one stroke over Dustin Johnson and Pat Perez, who finished at 9-under-par.

Harman held the 54-hole lead at the 2017 U.S. Open played at Erin Hills in Erin, Wisconsin. He entered the final round one stroke clear of three players, at 12 under par, and was the first time he had played in the final group of a major during the final round. He finished in a tie for second place with Hideki Matsuyama, four strokes behind winner Brooks Koepka, following a final round 72.

Harman finished in solo second at the 2022 World Wide Technology Championship at Mayakoba, four shots behind winner Russell Henley. This was Harman's best finish on the PGA Tour for over five years. He followed this up with a tie for second in his next appearance at the RSM Classic, two shots behind winner Adam Svensson.

In July 2023, Harman won the Open Championship at Royal Liverpool by six strokes for his first major championship title, becoming only the third left-handed Open champion (alongside Bob Charles and Phil Mickelson), and fifth left-handed major champion (with Mike Weir and Bubba Watson). Harman took control of the championship in the second round, carding a 65 that beat the field scoring average by more than eight strokes. He maintained a five-shot lead going into the final round before ultimately winning The Open by six. At 125-to-1 odds to win, Harman was considered to be a surprise winner.

In September 2023, Harman played on the U.S. team in the 2023 Ryder Cup at Marco Simone Golf and Country Club in Guidonia, Rome, Italy. The European team won 16.5–11.5 and Harman went 2–2–0 including a loss in his Sunday singles match against Tyrrell Hatton.

In April 2025, Harman won the Valero Texas Open by three shots over Ryan Gerard. It was Harman's first victory since winning the 2023 Open Championship.

== Personal life ==
Harman married Kelly Van Slyke on December 13, 2014. They have three children. The family resides in St. Simons Island, Georgia. Harman enjoys hunting.

== Amateur wins ==
- 2003 U.S. Junior Amateur
- 2005 Players Amateur, Georgia Amateur
- 2007 Porter Cup
- 2009 Dogwood Invitational

== Professional wins (6) ==
=== PGA Tour wins (4) ===
Legend
Major championships (1)
Other PGA Tour (3)

No.	Date	Tournament	Winning score	To par	Margin of victory	Runner(s)-up
1	Jul 13, 2014	John Deere Classic	63-68-65-66=262	−22	1 stroke	(United States) Zach Johnson
2	May 7, 2017	Wells Fargo Championship	71-69-70-68=278	−10	1 stroke	(United States) Dustin Johnson, (United States) Pat Perez
3	Jul 23, 2023	The Open Championship	67-65-69-70=271	−13	6 strokes	(Australia) Jason Day, (South Korea) Tom Kim, (Spain) Jon Rahm, (Austria) Sepp Straka
4	Apr 6, 2025	Valero Texas Open	66-66-72-75=279	−9	3 strokes	(United States) Ryan Gerard

=== eGolf Professional Tour wins (1) ===
No.	Date	Tournament	Winning score	To par	Margin of victory	Runners-up
1	Sep 11, 2010	Manor Classic	69-65-70-68=272	−12	3 strokes	(United States) Jason Kokrak, (United States) Drew Weaver

=== Other wins (1) ===
No.	Date	Tournament	Winning score	To par	Margin of victory	Runners-up
1	Dec 9, 2018	QBE Shootout (with (United States) Patton Kizzire)	59-66-61=186	−30	1 stroke	(Argentina) Emiliano Grillo and (Northern Ireland) Graeme McDowell

== Major championships ==
=== Wins (1) ===
Year	Championship	54 holes	Winning score	Margin	Runners-up
2023	The Open Championship	5 shot lead	−13 (67-65-69-70=271)	6 strokes	(Australia) Jason Day, (South Korea) Tom Kim, (Spain) Jon Rahm, (Austria) Sepp Straka

=== Results timeline ===
Results not in chronological order in 2020.

Tournament	2012	2013	2014	2015	2016	2017	2018
Masters Tournament				CUT			T44
U.S. Open	CUT			CUT		T2	T36
The Open Championship			T26	CUT		CUT	CUT
PGA Championship			T40	CUT		T13	T71

Tournament	2019	2020	2021	2022	2023	2024	2025	2026
Masters Tournament			T12	CUT	CUT	CUT	T36	T33
PGA Championship	CUT	T58	CUT	T34	CUT	T26	T60	T60
U.S. Open		T38	T19	T43	T43	T21	T59	T32
The Open Championship	CUT	NT	T19	T6	1	T60	T10	CUT

Top 10
Did not play

CUT = missed the half-way cut
"T" indicates a tie for a place
NT = no tournament due to COVID-19 pandemic

=== Summary ===
Tournament	Wins	2nd	3rd	Top-5	Top-10	Top-25	Events	Cuts made
Masters Tournament	0	0	0	0	0	1	8	4
PGA Championship	0	0	0	0	0	1	12	8
U.S. Open	0	1	0	1	1	3	11	9
The Open Championship	1	0	0	1	3	4	11	6
Totals	1	1	0	2	4	9	42	27

- Most consecutive cuts made – 10 (2024 PGA Championship – 2026 U.S. Open)
- Longest streak of top-10s – 1 (four times)

== Results in The Players Championship ==
Tournament	2012	2013	2014	2015	2016	2017	2018	2019
The Players Championship	T51	CUT	CUT	T8	T54	T53	CUT	T8

Tournament	2020	2021	2022	2023	2024	2025	2026
The Players Championship	C	T3	T63	T44	T2	CUT	T11

Top 10

CUT = missed the halfway cut
"T" indicates a tie for a place
C = canceled after the first round due to the COVID-19 pandemic

== Results in World Golf Championships ==
Results not in chronological order before 2015.

Tournament	2014	2015	2016	2017	2018	2019	2020	2021	2022	2023
Championship					T5					
Match Play					R16		NT^{1}	QF	T35	T17
Invitational	65			T50	62			T36		
Champions				8	72		NT^{1}	NT^{1}	NT^{1}	

^{1}Canceled due to COVID-19 pandemic

Top 10
Did not play

QF, R16, R32, R64 = Round in which player lost in match play
"T" = tied
NT = No tournament
Note that the Championship and Invitational were discontinued from 2022. The Champions was discontinued from 2023.

== U.S. national team appearances ==
Amateur

- Walker Cup: 2005 (winners), 2009 (winners)
- Palmer Cup: 2006, 2007 (winners)

Professional

- Ryder Cup: 2023
- Presidents Cup: 2024 (winners)

== See also ==
- 2011 PGA Tour Qualifying School graduates
