= 2026 Masters Tournament =

Golf tournament

- Front cover of the 2026 Masters Journal

Tournament information
- Dates: April 9–12, 2026
- Location: Augusta, Georgia, U.S. 33°30′09″N 82°01′12″W
- Course: Augusta National Golf Club
- Tours: PGA Tour; European Tour; Japan Golf Tour

Statistics
- Par: 72
- Length: 7,565 yards (6,917 m)
- Field: 91 players, 54 after cut
- Cut: 148 (+4)
- Prize fund: $22,500,000
- Winner's share: $4,500,000

Champion
- (Northern Ireland) Rory McIlroy
- 276 (−12)
- Location in the United States Location in Georgia

The 2026 Masters Tournament was the 90th edition of the Masters Tournament and the first of the four men's major golf championships held in 2026. The tournament was played April 9–12 at Augusta National Golf Club in Augusta, Georgia, United States.

Rory McIlroy won the tournament for the second consecutive year, one stroke ahead of runner-up Scottie Scheffler. He joined Jack Nicklaus, Nick Faldo and Tiger Woods as the only players to win two years consecutively.

== Course ==
Hole	Name	Yards	Par	Hole	Name	Yards	Par
1	Tea Olive	445	4	10	Camellia	495	4
2	Pink Dogwood	585	5	11	White Dogwood	520	4
3	Flowering Peach	350	4	12	Golden Bell	155	3
4	Flowering Crab Apple	240	3	13	Azalea	545	5
5	Magnolia	495	4	14	Chinese Fir	440	4
6	Juniper	180	3	15	Firethorn	550	5
7	Pampas	450	4	16	Redbud	170	3
8	Yellow Jasmine	570	5	17	Nandina	450	4
9	Carolina Cherry	460	4	18	Holly	465	4
Out		3,775	36	In		3,790	36
Source:				Total		7,565	72

The 17th hole (Nandina) was lengthened by 10 yards (9 m) for the 2026 tournament, making the hole's total length 450 yards (410 m).

A new three-story Player Services Building was in use for the first time at this tournament.

== Field ==
The field included 91 players, including six amateurs.

Going into the tournament, Scottie Scheffler was the betting favorite to win. Scheffler and Rory McIlroy were returning to play after three-week breaks. Twenty-two golfers made their Masters debut, including Jacob Bridgeman, Ben Griffin, Chris Gotterup and Kristoffer Reitan, all but Reitan were ranked in the top 20 in the Official World Golf Ranking. There were eight Nordic players in the field, the most of any year. Neither Phil Mickelson nor Tiger Woods played, which had not happened since the 1994 tournament.

=== Criteria ===
Participation in the Masters Tournament is by invitation only, and the tournament has the smallest field of the major championships. Invitations are issued to all past winners, recent major champions, leading finishers in the previous year's majors, leading players from the PGA Tour season, winners of full-point regular-season tournaments on the PGA Tour during the previous 12 months, leading players in the Official World Golf Ranking, and some leading amateurs.

In August 2025, Augusta National announced that invitations would also go to winners of several national opens, and no longer to winners during the PGA Tour's FedEx Cup Fall.

Players for the 2026 tournament included:

1. Past Masters winners

- Ángel Cabrera
- Fred Couples
- Sergio García
- Dustin Johnson
- Zach Johnson (13)
- Hideki Matsuyama (18,25,26)
- Rory McIlroy (5,18,25,26)
- José María Olazábal
- Jon Rahm (2,26)
- Patrick Reed (13,25,26)
- Scottie Scheffler (3,4,5,13,17,18,25,26)
- Charl Schwartzel
- Adam Scott
- Vijay Singh
- Jordan Spieth
- Bubba Watson
- Mike Weir
- Danny Willett
- Past winners who did not play: Tommy Aaron, Charles Coody, Ben Crenshaw, Nick Faldo, Raymond Floyd, Trevor Immelman, Bernhard Langer, Sandy Lyle, Phil Mickelson (4), Larry Mize, Jack Nicklaus, Mark O'Meara, Gary Player, Craig Stadler, Tom Watson, Tiger Woods, Ian Woosnam

2. Recent winners of the U.S. Open (2021–2025)

- Wyndham Clark (15,25)
- Bryson DeChambeau (13,16,25,26)
- Matt Fitzpatrick (15,17,25,26)
- J. J. Spaun (17,18,25,26)

3. Recent winners of The Open Championship (2021–2025)

- Brian Harman (18,25,26)
- Collin Morikawa (17,18,25,26)
- Xander Schauffele (4,13,25,26)
- Cameron Smith

4. Recent winners of the PGA Championship (2021–2025)

- Brooks Koepka
- Justin Thomas (17,18,25,26)

5. Recent winners of The Players Championship (2024–2026)

- Cameron Young (14,17,18,25,26)

6. The winner of the gold medal at the Olympic Games (Note: Players qualifying under this category are only eligible for the first Masters Tournament following the Olympic Games.)

7. The winner and runner-up in the 2025 U.S. Amateur

- Jackson Herrington (a)
- Mason Howell (a)

8. The winner of the 2025 Amateur Championship

- Ethan Fang (a)

9. The winner of the 2025 Asia-Pacific Amateur Championship

- Fifa Laopakdee (a)

10. The winner of the 2026 Latin America Amateur Championship

- Mateo Pulcini (a)

11. The winner of the 2025 U.S. Mid-Amateur Golf Championship

- Brandon Holtz (a)

12. The winner of the 2025 NCAA Division I men's golf individual championship

- Michael La Sasso forfeited his exemption by turning professional. (Note: La Sasso turned professional in January 2026 after accepting a place in LIV Golf, forfeiting his invitation to the Masters.)

13. The leading 12 players, and those tying for 12th place, from the 2025 Masters Tournament

- Ludvig Åberg (18,25,26)
- Corey Conners (18,25,26)
- Jason Day (26)
- Harris English (15,16,18,25,26)
- Max Homa
- Im Sung-jae (18,25)
- Justin Rose (17,18,25,26)

14. The leading four players, and those tying for fourth place, in the 2025 U.S. Open

- Tyrrell Hatton (25,26)
- Viktor Hovland (18,25,26)
- Robert MacIntyre (18,25,26)
- Carlos Ortiz

15. The leading four players, and those tying for fourth place, in the 2025 Open Championship

- Chris Gotterup (17,18,19,25,26)
- Li Haotong

16. The leading four players, and those tying for fourth place, in the 2025 PGA Championship

- Davis Riley

17. Winners of tournaments on the PGA Tour between the 2025 and 2026 Masters (Note: Events must carry full-point allocation towards the Tour Championship in order to qualify.)

- Akshay Bhatia (18,25,26)
- Keegan Bradley (18,25,26)
- Jacob Bridgeman (18,26)
- Brian Campbell
- Nico Echavarría (26)
- Tommy Fleetwood (18,25,26)
- Ben Griffin (18,25,26)
- Ryan Fox (25,26)
- Kurt Kitayama (25,26)
- Aldrich Potgieter
- Sepp Straka (18,25,26)
- Gary Woodland

18. All players who qualified for and were eligible for the 2025 Tour Championship

- Sam Burns (25,26)
- Patrick Cantlay (25,26)
- Harry Hall
- Russell Henley (25,26)
- Shane Lowry (25,26)
- Maverick McNealy (25,26)
- Andrew Novak (25,26)
- Nick Taylor

19. The winner of the 2025 Genesis Scottish Open

20. The winner of the 2025 Open de España

- Marco Penge (25,26)

21. The winner of the 2025 Japan Open Golf Championship

- Naoyuki Kataoka

22. The winner of the 2025 Link Hong Kong Open

- Tom McKibbin

23. The winner of the 2025 Crown Australian Open

- Rasmus Neergaard-Petersen (25)

24. The winner of the 2026 Investec South African Open Championship

- Casey Jarvis

25. The leading 50 players on the Official World Golf Ranking as of December 31, 2025

- Michael Brennan (26)
- Ryan Gerard (26)
- Max Greyserman
- Rasmus Højgaard
- Johnny Keefer
- Michael Kim
- Kim Si-woo (26)
- Min Woo Lee (26)
- Alex Norén (26)
- Aaron Rai (26)
- Kristoffer Reitan (26)
- Sam Stevens (26)
- Sami Välimäki

26. The leading 50 players on the Official World Golf Ranking as of March 30, 2026

- Daniel Berger
- Nicolai Højgaard
- Jake Knapp
- Matt McCarty

== Pre-tournament events ==
=== Champions Dinner ===
In keeping with tradition, defending champion Rory McIlroy chose the menu for the Masters Club Dinner, which took place on April 7. The dinner tradition, which began in 1952 when Ben Hogan invited past Masters champions to dine together, is attended by former champions as members of the Masters Club.

The appetizers included bacon-wrapped dates with goat cheese; elk sliders with caramelized onion jam and garlic aioli; peach and ricotta flatbread; and rock shrimp tempura. Yellowfin tuna carpaccio with foie gras, a toasted baguette and chives were followed by a choice of either wagyu filet mignon or salmon, each served with champ, Brussels sprouts, glazed carrots with brown butter, and Vidalia onion rings. Dessert was sticky toffee pudding with sauce and ice cream.

The wine selection included a 2015 Champagne Salon brut; a 2022 Domaine Leflaive Burgundy; a 1990 Château Lafite Rothschild Bordeaux; and a 1989 Château d'Yquem Bordeaux.

=== Par 3 Contest ===
Aaron Rai won the Par 3 Contest with a score of 21 (−6), finishing one stroke ahead of Jacob Bridgeman and John Keefer, who tied for second at 22 (−5), followed by J. J. Spaun and Mason Howell at 24 (−3). Seventeen players completed their own rounds without allowing family members or guests to hit shots, out of a field of 80 competitors. Four holes-in-one were recorded, including one by Keegan Bradley, who became the first player to make a hole-in-one in consecutive years. Tommy Fleetwood, Justin Thomas and Wyndham Clark also recorded aces. Comedian and actor Kevin Hart caddied for Bryson DeChambeau.

== Broadcasting ==
The tournament was streamed on the Masters website and app for the entirety of the competition, as well as on Prime Video and ESPN on Thursday and Friday, and Paramount+ and CBS on Saturday and Sunday. ESPN added former Philadelphia Eagles player Jason Kelce as a host for its coverage of the Par 3 Contest on April 8; Kelce joined Scott Van Pelt and Marty Smith.

== Round summaries ==
=== First round ===
Thursday, April 9, 2026

Honorary starters Jack Nicklaus, Tom Watson and Gary Player opened the 90th edition of the Masters Tournament. Sam Burns and defending champion Rory McIlroy shared the first-round lead after both posted 67 (−5). McIlroy recovered from an inconsistent start to record three consecutive birdies on holes 13 through 15. Burns, who played in the morning, recorded an eagle on the par-5 2nd hole and added birdies on holes 12, 13 and 15.

A group of three players, Patrick Reed, Jason Day and Kurt Kitayama, were tied for third at 69 (−3). Justin Rose, runner-up in the previous tournament, reached 4-under late in his round but finished with consecutive bogeys to card a 70 (−2). World number one Scottie Scheffler opened with an eagle on the 2nd hole and a birdie on the 3rd to reach 3-under early in his round, but recorded no birdies on the second nine and finished at 70 (−2). He was tied with Xander Schauffele and Shane Lowry. Fred Couples was 2-under through 14 holes before recording a quadruple bogey and two double bogeys over his closing holes, finishing in the lower half of the leaderboard.

Scoring conditions were more difficult than in the previous year, with only 16 players under par after the first round, the fewest at the Masters after 18 holes since 2017. Among those scoring over par were Jon Rahm, who recorded a 78 (+6) without a birdie, and Bryson DeChambeau, who shot 76 (+4), including a triple bogey on the 11th hole.

Place	Player	Score	To par
T1	(United States) Sam Burns	67	−5
T1	(Northern Ireland) Rory McIlroy	67	−5
T3	(Australia) Jason Day	69	−3
T3	(United States) Kurt Kitayama	69	−3
T3	(United States) Patrick Reed	69	−3
T6	(Republic of Ireland) Shane Lowry	70	−2
T6	(England) Justin Rose	70	−2
T6	(United States) Xander Schauffele	70	−2
T6	(United States) Scottie Scheffler	70	−2
T10	(United States) Jacob Bridgeman	71	−1
T10	(United States) Brian Campbell	71	−1
T10	(England) Tommy Fleetwood	71	−1
T10	(China) Li Haotong	71	−1
T10	(England) Aaron Rai	71	−1
T10	(Canada) Nick Taylor	71	−1
T10	(United States) Gary Woodland	71	−1

=== Second round ===
Friday, April 10, 2026

Rory McIlroy seized the outright lead after the second round, carding a 65 (−7) to reach 132 (−12) for the tournament. Beginning the day tied for the lead, he recorded multiple birdies over his closing holes, including a chip-in on the 17th, and opened a six-stroke advantage over the field, the largest 36-hole lead in Masters Tournament history.

Patrick Reed and Sam Burns were tied for second place. Tommy Fleetwood moved into contention with a round that included two eagles to reach 139 (−5), joined by Justin Rose and Shane Lowry as the last contenders with a realistic chance heading into the weekend. Jason Day also remained within the group of trailing players after a series of birdies earlier in his round. Tyrrell Hatton recorded a 66 (−6) and hit all 18 greens in regulation; the last time this had been achieved at the Masters was Kevin Na during the in 2020.

The cut fell at 148 (+4), with 54 players advancing to the weekend. Among those missing the cut were Bryson DeChambeau, J. J. Spaun, Nicolai Højgaard and Robert MacIntyre. Jon Rahm made the cut after a birdie on the 16th hole during his second round. For the second consecutive year, no amateurs made the 36-hole cut.

Place	Player	Score	To par
1	(Northern Ireland) Rory McIlroy	67-65=132	−12
T2	(United States) Sam Burns	67-71=138	−6
T2	(United States) Patrick Reed	69-69=138	−6
T4	(England) Tommy Fleetwood	71-68=139	−5
T4	(Republic of Ireland) Shane Lowry	70-69=139	−5
T4	(England) Justin Rose	70-69=139	−5
T7	(United States) Wyndham Clark	72-68=140	−4
T7	(Australia) Jason Day	69-71=140	−4
T7	(England) Tyrrell Hatton	74-66=140	−4
T7	(China) Li Haotong	71-69=140	−4
T7	(Norway) Kristoffer Reitan	72-68=140	−4
T7	(United States) Cameron Young	73-67=140	−4

=== Third round ===
Saturday, April 11, 2026

Rory McIlroy started with a six-shot advantage, but his lead was erased over moving day. McIlroy's round was 73 (+1), including being 3 over par around Amen Corner. Cameron Young, seeking to be the third consecutive golfer to win the Players Championship and the Masters Tournament in the same year, turned in the joint-lowest round of the day, a 65 (−7). This brought Young from eight shots back into a share of the lead with McIlroy, at 205 (−11), securing a place in the final pairing on Sunday.

Sam Burns scored a bogey-free 68 (−4) to leave him one shot behind the leaders. Jason Day produced a mid-round charge featuring four consecutive birdies, finishing with a 68 (−4), to move into contention at 8-under. Justin Rose turned in a second consecutive 69 (−3), leaving him also 8 under. Shane Lowry achieved a hole-in-one at the par-three 6th on his way to a 68, climbing into solo fourth at 9-under. World number one Scottie Scheffler recorded a bogey-free 65 to surge back into contention.

The third-round scoring average of 70.63 was the lowest in third-round Masters history.

Place	Player	Score	To par
T1	(Northern Ireland) Rory McIlroy	67-65-73=205	−11
T1	(United States) Cameron Young	73-67-65=205	−11
3	(United States) Sam Burns	67-71-68=206	−10
4	(Republic of Ireland) Shane Lowry	70-69-68=207	−9
T5	(Australia) Jason Day	69-71-68=208	−8
T5	(England) Justin Rose	70-69-69=208	−8
T7	(China) Li Haotong	71-69-69=209	−7
T7	(United States) Scottie Scheffler	70-74-65=209	−7
T9	(United States) Patrick Cantlay	77-67-66=210	−6
T9	(United States) Russell Henley	73-71-66=210	−6
T9	(United States) Patrick Reed	69-69-72=210	−6

=== Final round ===
Sunday, April 12, 2026

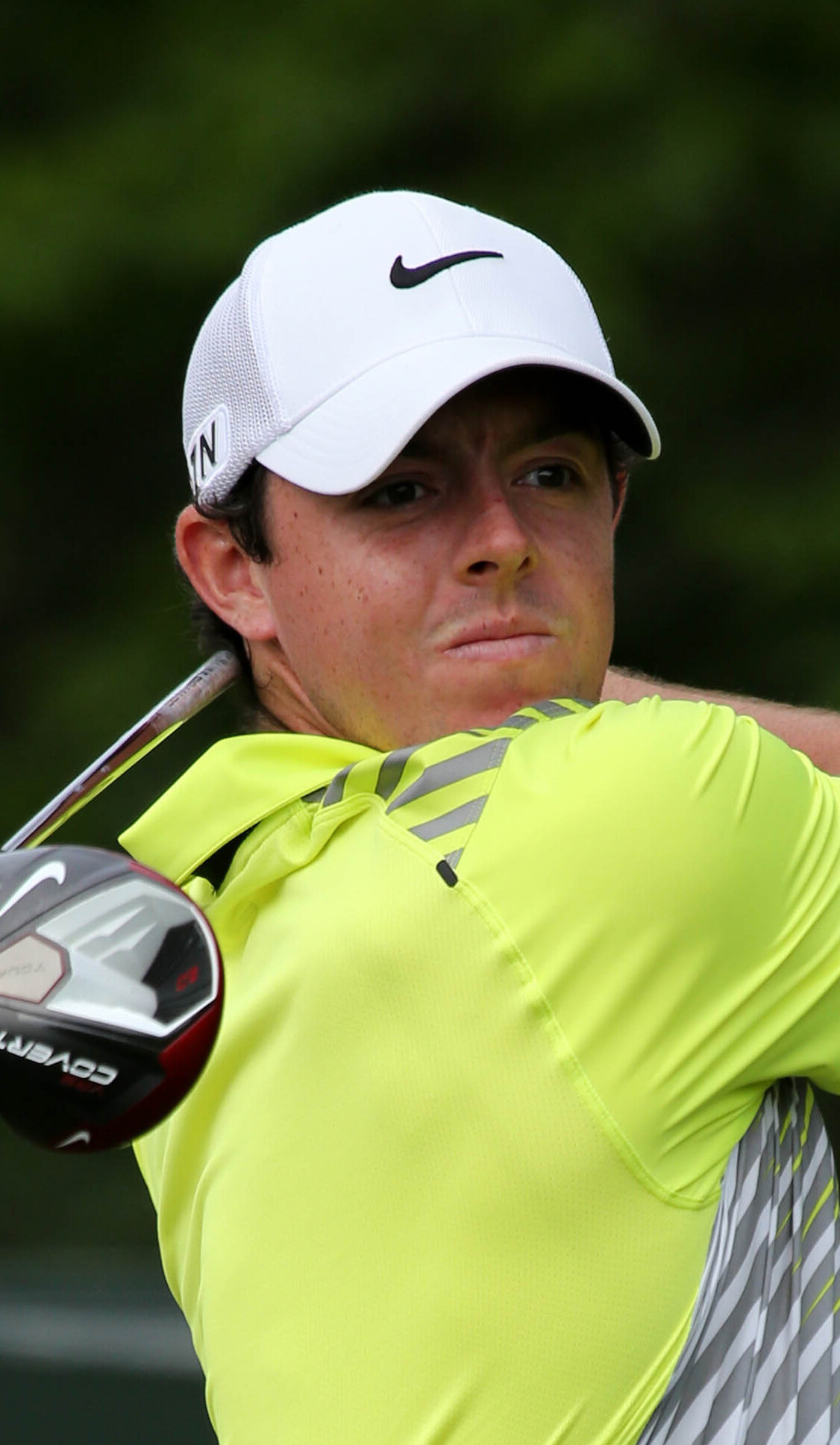
Rory McIlroy won his second Masters title wire-to-wire and became the fourth to defend the title.

Third-round co-leader Rory McIlroy shot a 71 (−1) to finish at 276 (−12) and win by one stroke over Scottie Scheffler, who shot a 68 (−4) for the round to finish alone in second at 277 (−11).

McIlroy immediately lost his share of the lead early in his round after a double bogey at the par-three 4th, where he pulled his tee shot and proceeded to 3-putt, falling behind the lead. He dropped another shot shortly after at the 6th, while playing partner Cameron Young and Justin Rose, who was playing in the group ahead, both moved into contention.

Rose, starting the day three shots back, produced a charge through the middle of the first nine with a run of three consecutive birdies to take the outright lead at −12, which afforded him a 2-stroke lead as he headed for the turn. McIlroy, meanwhile, steadied himself and responded with consecutive birdies on 7 and 8 to move back within one shot of the lead heading into the turn.

On the 11th, Rose bogeyed after missing the green with his approach, allowing McIlroy to draw level. McIlroy then regained the outright lead on the second nine, capitalizing on scoring opportunities and avoiding further mistakes. Rose then faltered through Amen Corner and the back nine, including a chunked chip on the 12th and a three-putt on the 13th after reaching the green in two, while McIlroy made key birdies at the 12th and 13th to take control with a two-shot lead.

Scheffler, playing ahead, steadily climbed into contention with a bogey-free round and set the clubhouse lead at −11 after posting a 68, becoming the first player since 1942 to complete the weekend without a bogey at the Masters.

Rose remained in contention after Amen Corner but failed to convert further birdie opportunities, and despite a late birdie on the 15th, a costly bogey on the 17th, missing a 3-foot par putt left him tied for third alongside Tyrrell Hatton, Russell Henley and Young at −10.

After maintaining control through pars on the closing stretch, McIlroy took a two-shot lead to the 18th tee over Scheffler knowing a bogey would be enough. His drive found trouble in the right trees, but he recovered into the greenside bunker to save a closing bogey, securing victory by a single stroke. With this victory, he joined Jack Nicklaus, Nick Faldo and Tiger Woods as the only players to repeat as champion.

Collin Morikawa and Sam Burns finished tied for seventh at −9, while Max Homa and Xander Schauffele rounded out the top ten at −8.

Champion
(a) = amateur
(c) = past champion

Place	Player	Score	To par	Money ($)
1	(Northern Ireland) Rory McIlroy (c)	67-65-73-71=276	−12	4,500,000
2	(United States) Scottie Scheffler (c)	70-74-65-68=277	−11	2,430,000
T3	(England) Tyrrell Hatton	74-66-72-66=278	−10	1,080,000
T3	(United States) Russell Henley	73-71-66-68=278	−10	1,080,000
T3	(England) Justin Rose	70-69-69-70=278	−10	1,080,000
T3	(United States) Cameron Young	73-67-65-73=278	−10	1,080,000
T7	(United States) Sam Burns	67-71-68-73=279	−9	725,625
T7	(United States) Collin Morikawa	74-69-68-68=279	−9	725,625
T9	(United States) Max Homa	72-70-71-67=280	−8	630,000
T9	(United States) Xander Schauffele	70-72-70-68=280	−8	630,000

Leaderboard below the top 10
Place	Player	Score	To par	Money ($)
11	(United States) Jake Knapp	73-69-69-70=281	−7	562,500
T12	(United States) Patrick Cantlay	77-67-66-73=283	−5	427,500
T12	(Australia) Jason Day	69-71-68-75=283	−5	427,500
T12	(United States) Brooks Koepka	72-69-71-71=283	−5	427,500
T12	(Japan) Hideki Matsuyama (c)	72-70-72-69=283	−5	427,500
T12	(United States) Patrick Reed (c)	69-69-72-73=283	−5	427,500
T12	(United States) Jordan Spieth (c)	72-73-70-68=283	−5	427,500
T18	(England) Matt Fitzpatrick	74-69-70-71=284	−4	315,000
T18	(Norway) Viktor Hovland	75-71-71-67=284	−4	315,000
T18	(United States) Maverick McNealy	77-70-70-67=284	−4	315,000
T21	(Sweden) Ludvig Åberg	74-70-69-72=285	−3	252,000
T21	(United States) Keegan Bradley	72-74-73-66=285	−3	252,000
T21	(United States) Wyndham Clark	72-68-72-73=285	−3	252,000
T24	(United States) Michael Brennan	72-71-70-73=286	−2	182,250
T24	(United States) Brian Campbell	71-73-69-73=286	−2	182,250
T24	(United States) Chris Gotterup	72-69-72-73=286	−2	182,250
T24	(United States) Matt McCarty	72-73-72-69=286	−2	182,250
T24	(Australia) Adam Scott (c)	72-74-70-70=286	−2	182,250
T24	(United States) Sam Stevens	72-74-70-70=286	−2	182,250
T30	(United States) Harris English	73-71-71-72=287	−1	146,250
T30	(Republic of Ireland) Shane Lowry	70-69-68-80=287	−1	146,250
T30	(Sweden) Alex Norén	77-71-69-70=287	−1	146,250
T33	(England) Tommy Fleetwood	71-68-73-76=288	E	121,500
T33	(United States) Ben Griffin	72-69-70-77=288	E	121,500
T33	(United States) Brian Harman	79-69-67-73=288	E	121,500
T33	(United States) Dustin Johnson (c)	73-71-75-69=288	E	121,500
T33	(United States) Gary Woodland	71-75-76-66=288	E	121,500
T38	(United States) Ryan Gerard	72-72-68-77=289	+1	101,250
T38	(China) Li Haotong	71-69-69-80=289	+1	101,250
T38	(Spain) Jon Rahm (c)	78-70-73-68=289	+1	101,250
T41	(United States) Jacob Bridgeman	71-74-69-76=290	+2	83,250
T41	(Norway) Kristoffer Reitan	72-69-73-77=290	+2	83,250
T41	(Austria) Sepp Straka	73-72-69-76=290	+2	83,250
T41	(Canada) Nick Taylor	71-72-70-77=290	+2	83,250
T41	(United States) Justin Thomas	72-74-71-73=290	+2	83,250
46	(South Korea) Im Sung-jae	76-69-69-77=291	+3	69,750
47	(South Korea) Kim Si-woo	75-73-72-72=292	+4	65,250
48	(England) Aaron Rai	71-74-78-70=293	+5	61,650
T49	(Canada) Corey Conners	75-73-71-75=294	+6	57,600
T49	(England) Marco Penge	76-69-71-78=294	+6	57,600
51	(United States) Kurt Kitayama	69-79-75-72=295	+7	55,350
52	(Spain) Sergio García (c)	72-75-74-75=296	+8	54,000
53	(Denmark) Rasmus Højgaard	78-70-73-77=298	+10	53,100
54	(South Africa) Charl Schwartzel (c)	75-73-77-75=300	+12	52,200
CUT	(New Zealand) Ryan Fox	77-72=149	+5	
CUT	(England) Harry Hall	77-72=149	+5	
CUT	(United States) J. J. Spaun	74-75=149	+5	
CUT	(United States) Bubba Watson (c)	76-73=149	+5	
CUT	(England) Danny Willett (c)	76-73=149	+5	
CUT	(United States) Akshay Bhatia	73-77=150	+6	
CUT	(United States) Bryson DeChambeau	76-74=150	+6	
CUT	(Denmark) Nicolai Højgaard	76-74=150	+6	
CUT	(United States) Zach Johnson (c)	75-75=150	+6	
CUT	(Scotland) Robert MacIntyre	80-71=151	+7	
CUT	(Northern Ireland) Tom McKibbin	75-76=151	+7	
CUT	(Denmark) Rasmus Neergaard-Petersen	77-74=151	+7	
CUT	(United States) Andrew Novak	75-76=151	+7	
CUT	(Australia) Cameron Smith	74-77=151	+7	
CUT	(United States) Daniel Berger	76-76=152	+8	
CUT	(United States) Ethan Fang (a)	74-78=152	+8	
CUT	(United States) Jackson Herrington (a)	76-76=152	+8	
CUT	(South Africa) Casey Jarvis	77-75=152	+8	
CUT	(United States) Michael Kim	75-77=152	+8	
CUT	(United States) Fred Couples (c)	78-75=153	+9	
CUT	(United States) Mason Howell (a)	77-76=153	+9	
CUT	(Spain) José María Olazábal (c)	74-79=153	+9	
CUT	(Fiji) Vijay Singh (c)	79-75=154	+10	
CUT	(Canada) Mike Weir (c)	81-73=154	+10	
CUT	(United States) Johnny Keefer	76-79=155	+11	
CUT	(Thailand) Fifa Laopakdee (a)	80-75=155	+11	
CUT	(Australia) Min Woo Lee	78-77=155	+11	
CUT	(Mexico) Carlos Ortiz	80-75=155	+11	
CUT	(Finland) Sami Välimäki	80-75=155	+11	
CUT	(United States) Max Greyserman	79-77=156	+12	
CUT	(Colombia) Nico Echavarría	79-78=157	+13	
CUT	(United States) Brandon Holtz (a)	81-78=159	+15	
CUT	(Japan) Naoyuki Kataoka	84-75=159	+15	
CUT	(South Africa) Aldrich Potgieter	84-75=159	+15	
CUT	(Argentina) Mateo Pulcini (a)	81-78=159	+15	
CUT	(Argentina) Ángel Cabrera (c)	79-81=160	+16	
CUT	(United States) Davis Riley	82-80=162	+18	

==== Scorecard ====
Hole	1	2	3	4	5	6	7	8	9	10	11	12	13	14	15	16	17	18
Par	4	5	4	3	4	3	4	5	4	4	4	3	5	4	5	3	4	4
(Northern Ireland) McIlroy	−11	−11	−12	−10	−10	−9	−10	−11	−11	−11	−11	−12	−13	−13	−13	−13	−13	−12
(United States) Scheffler	−8	−8	−9	−9	−9	−9	−9	−9	−9	−9	−9	−9	−9	−9	−10	−11	−11	−11
(England) Hatton	−4	−5	−5	−4	−4	−4	−6	−7	−7	−6	−6	−6	−7	−8	−9	−10	−10	−10
(United States) Henley	−7	−7	−7	−8	−8	−8	−9	−10	−10	−10	−10	−9	−10	−10	−10	−10	−10	−10
(England) Rose	−9	−9	−8	−8	−9	−9	−10	−11	−12	−12	−11	−10	−10	−10	−11	−11	−10	−10
(United States) Young	−11	−12	−12	−12	−12	−11	−10	−11	−10	−10	−10	−10	−10	−10	−10	−10	−10	−10
(United States) Burns	−11	−9	−8	−8	−8	−8	−8	−8	−8	−7	−7	−7	−8	−9	−9	−10	−9	−9
(Australia) Day	−8	−8	−8	−8	−7	−7	−5	−5	−5	−5	−5	−5	−5	−5	−5	−5	−5	−5
(Republic of Ireland) Lowry	−8	−9	−9	−8	−6	−6	−6	−6	−6	−6	−4	−3	−4	−3	−4	−2	−2	−1
(China) Li	−6	−7	−8	−8	−7	−6	−5	−6	−7	−7	−7	−4	+1	E	E	E	+1	+1

Cumulative tournament scores, relative to par

Eagle	Birdie	Bogey	Double bogey	Triple bogey+
