= 2026 Walker Cup =

Golf tournament

51st Walker Cup Match
- Dates: 5–6 September 2026
- Venue: Old Course at Lahinch Golf Club
- Location: Lahinch, County Clare, Ireland
- Captains: Dean Robertson (GB&I); Nathan Smith (USA)
(United Kingdom) (Republic of Ireland)	13 1/2	12 1/2	(United States)
- Great Britain & Ireland wins the Walker Cup

Location map
- Location in Ireland

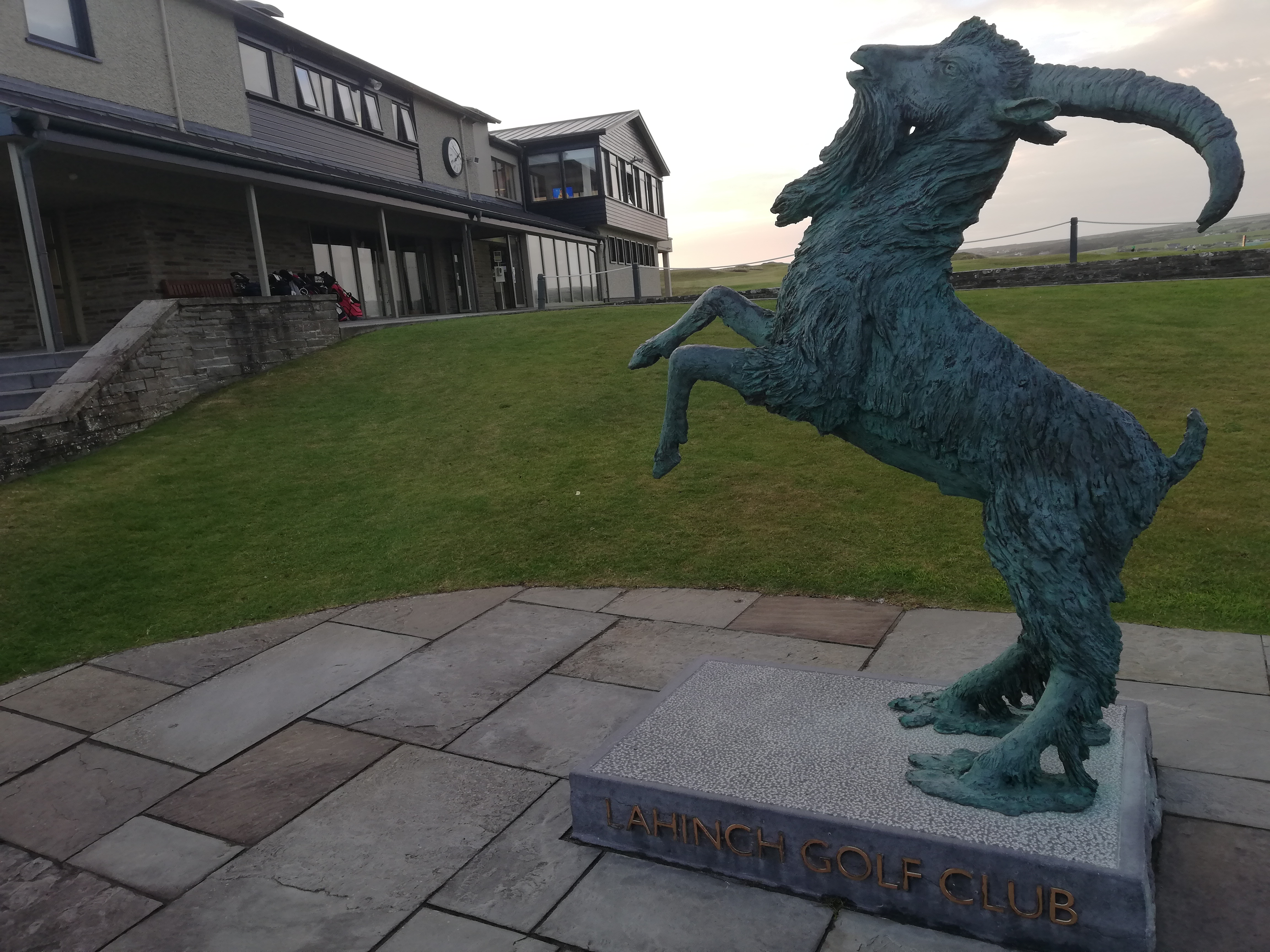
The Rampant Goat statue near the clubhouse of Lahinch Golf Club

The 51st Walker Cup Match was held on 5 and 6 September 2026 at Lahinch Golf Club in Ireland. It was the first time that Lahinch was chosen as host of a Walker Cup Match. Following the 2025 Walker Cup, it marked the return of the event to even-numbered years to avoid scheduling conflicts with the Eisenhower Trophy. The United States entered the event as champions, having won each of the previous five editions, and required 13 points to retain the cup. Great Britain & Ireland won the Sunday singles matches 7–3 to claim the Walker Cup by a score of 13 1/2–12 1/2. This was their first victory in the competition since 2015.

== Venue ==
In 2023, it was announced that Lahinch Golf Club in the town of Lahinch, County Clare, Ireland would host the 2026 Walker Cup. It was the first time Lahinch was chosen as host of the event. The club regularly hosted the South of Ireland Amateur Championship, first held in 1895. Lahinch also hosted the 2019 Irish Open, which was won by Jon Rahm, and the 2024 Arnold Palmer Cup, which was won by the United States. It is situated along the Atlantic coast of Ireland and has been described as "one of the top links courses" in the country by The Irish Times.

== Format ==
The Walker Cup is a 10-man amateur team competition contested by the United States and Great Britain & Ireland. The opening ceremony for the 2026 Walker Cup was scheduled for Friday, 4 September 2026. On Saturday, four matches of foursomes in the morning and eight singles matches in the afternoon were scheduled. On Sunday, four matches of foursomes in the morning and ten singles matches in the afternoon were scheduled. One point is awarded for a victory in each match, and a half-point is awarded to both sides if a match is all square after 18 holes. As the United States won the 2025 Walker Cup, they required 13 points to retain the cup in 2026, while Great Britain & Ireland required 13.5 points to win the cup.

== Teams ==
=== Great Britain and Ireland ===
The Great Britain and Ireland team was announced on 18 August 2026. Stuart Grehan, winner of the 2026 Amateur Championship, was the first to secure qualification on the team. Grehan was one of six to return to the team from the 2025 Walker Cup. Jack Whaley, winner of the 2026 U.S. Amateur, was among the four making their debut in the competition.

& Great Britain & Ireland
Name	Rank	Age	Notes
(Scotland) Dean Robertson		56	non-playing captain
(England) Eliot Baker	13	23	Played in 2025
(England) Ben Bolton	86	19
(England) Sam Easterbrook	76	21
(Scotland) Connor Graham	26	19	Played in 2023 and 2025
(Republic of Ireland) Stuart Grehan	28	33	Played in 2025
(England) Josh Hill	93	22
(England) Luke Poulter	8	22	Played in 2025
(Scotland) Niall Sheils Donegan	18	21	Played in 2025
(England) Tyler Weaver	3	21	Played in 2025
(England) Jack Whaley	45	22

=== United States ===
The United States announced the selection of the first four players on the team in July 2026: Ethan Fang, Miles Russell, Preston Stout, and Tyler Watts. The final six players on the team were confirmed on 16 August 2026, following the U.S. Amateur, and included mid-amateur Stewart Hagestad. Stout and Fang had both played in the 2025 Walker Cup, while Hagestad was selected for his sixth Walker Cup appearance.

USA
Name	Rank	Age	Notes
Nathan Smith		48	non-playing captain
Kihei Akina	11	20
Ryder Cowan	6	20
Ethan Fang	9	21	Played in 2025
Josiah Gilbert	7	20
Stewart Hagestad	25	35	Played in 2017, 2019, 2021, 2023 and 2025
William Jennings	4	20
Jay Leng Jr.	12	20
Miles Russell	5	17
Preston Stout	1	21	Played in 2025
Tyler Watts	2	18

Note: "Rank" is the World Amateur Golf Ranking as of the start of the Cup.

== Saturday's matches ==
=== Morning foursomes ===
Great Britain & Ireland established a one-point lead after the opening foursomes matches. During the session, Niall Sheils Donegan missed a birdie putt to win the 10th hole and quickly scooped up the ball before the par had been conceded. Ryder Cowan called for a rules official, who awarded the hole to the United States. Donegan and his playing partner Josh Hill ultimately won the match, 4 and 3. Donegan said afterwards: "It was completely on me. ... I had a foot back, and I just dragged it away like I’m in a Sunday bounce game, but those aren’t the rules of golf." Around 8,000 spectators were in attendance at Lahinch Golf Club for the foursomes matches.

&	Results
Grehan/Baker	halved	Stout/Fang
Graham/Weaver	(United Kingdom) (Republic of Ireland) 1 up	Leng/Akina
Poulter/Easterbrook	(United States) 1 up	Russell/Watts
Sheils Donegan/Hill	(United Kingdom) (Republic of Ireland) 4 & 3	Gilbert/Cowan
2 1/2	Foursomes	1 1/2
2 1/2	Overall	1 1/2

=== Afternoon singles ===
Stuart Grehan, the 2026 Amateur Champion, and Preston Stout, the number one in the World Amateur Golf Ranking, led off the Saturday singles matches. Grehan won each of the last three holes to win, 1 up. The United States won all of the next four matches, and Great Britain & Ireland won the remaining three matches for a 4–4 session. This secured a 6 1/2–5 1/2 lead for Great Britain & Ireland entering Sunday.

&	Results
Stuart Grehan	(United Kingdom) (Republic of Ireland) 1 up	Preston Stout
Jack Whaley	(United States) 1 up	Ethan Fang
Connor Graham	(United States) 1 up	William Jennings
Tyler Weaver	(United States) 2 & 1	Jay Leng Jr.
Ben Bolton	(United States) 2 & 1	Stewart Hagestad
Luke Poulter	(United Kingdom) (Republic of Ireland) 2 & 1	Miles Russell
Niall Sheils Donegan	(United Kingdom) (Republic of Ireland) 3 & 2	Tyler Watts
Eliot Baker	(United Kingdom) (Republic of Ireland) 3 & 2	Josiah Gilbert
4	Singles	4
6 1/2	Overall	5 1/2

== Sunday's matches ==
=== Morning foursomes ===
The United States swept the morning foursomes to build a three-point lead. Great Britain & Ireland did not hold a lead at any point in any of the matches, none of which reached the 17th hole. This was the first sweep in a Walker Cup session since the Sunday foursomes in 2007.

&	Results
Grehan/Baker	(United States) 3 & 2	Stout/Fang
Poulter/Easterbrook	(United States) 4 & 3	Leng/Akina
Weaver/Graham	(United States) 3 & 2	Russell/Watts
Sheils Donegan/Hill	(United States) 4 & 3	Jennings/Cowan
0	Foursomes	4
6 1/2	Overall	9 1/2

=== Afternoon singles ===
Trailing by three points headed into the singles session, Great Britain & Ireland required at least 7 points to win the cup, and the United States needed 3 1/2 points to retain the cup. Each of the first four matches were won by GB&I, including an 8 and 7 victory for Jack Whaley over William Jennings. This was the largest margin of victory for GB&I in a Walker Cup singles match. The cup was decided by the match between Josh Hill and Tyler Watts, where Hill got up-and-down for birdie from a bunker on the 18th hole to win his match. This brought GB&I to 13 1/2 points and secured their first victory in the competition since 2015. The comeback victory drew comparisons to the 2012 Ryder Cup.

&	Results
Stuart Grehan	(United Kingdom) (Republic of Ireland) 2 & 1	Preston Stout
Luke Poulter	(United Kingdom) (Republic of Ireland) 3 & 1	Ethan Fang
Jack Whaley	(United Kingdom) (Republic of Ireland) 8 & 7	William Jennings
Tyler Weaver	(United Kingdom) (Republic of Ireland) 4 & 3	Jay Leng Jr.
Niall Sheils Donegan	halved	Kihei Akina
Eliot Baker	(United Kingdom) (Republic of Ireland) 1 up	Stewart Hagestad
Connor Graham	halved	Miles Russell
Josh Hill	(United Kingdom) (Republic of Ireland) 1 up	Tyler Watts
Ben Bolton	(United States) 4 & 2	Ryder Cowan
Sam Easterbrook	(United States) 4 & 3	Josiah Gilbert
7	Singles	3
13 1/2	Overall	12 1/2
