= Stuart Grehan =

Irish golfer (born 1992)

Personal information
- Full name: Stuart Peter Grehan
- Nationality: Ireland
- Born: 30 December 1992 (age 33) Tullamore, Ireland
- Height: 6 ft 0 in (183 cm)
- Spouse: Carla Reynolds (m. 2023)
- Children: 1

Career
- Sport: Golf
- College: Eastern Michigan University; Maynooth University
- Turned professional: 2017
- Reinstated amateur: 2025
- Former tours: Challenge Tour; Clutch Pro Tour; PGA EuroPro Tour
- Professional wins: 5

Best results in major championships
- Masters Tournament: DNP
- PGA Championship: DNP
- U.S. Open: DNP
- The Open Championship: CUT: 2026

Stuart Peter Grehan (born 30 December 1992) is an Irish golfer who won the 2026 Amateur Championship. Outside of golf, he works as a financial advisor.

After a promising amateur career, Grehan turned professional in 2017. He struggled to establish himself in the professional ranks and applied for the reinstatement of his amateur status in 2024. Grehan won the Amateur Championship in 2026, which earned him invitations to the Open Championship, Masters Tournament and U.S. Open.

Grehan won the 2016 Arnold Palmer Cup representing Europe, the 2026 European Amateur Team Championship representing Ireland, and the 2026 Walker Cup representing Great Britain & Ireland.

== Early life and amateur career ==
Grehan was born on 30 December 1992 in Tullamore, Ireland, to Helen and John Grehan. He started playing golf at age 13, initially through pitch and putt. He improved quickly, recalling in 2024: "When I got down to a two or three handicap, I thought 'Jeez, maybe I'll give this a go'. Then I had a really good year when I was 17 or 18 and I got from a three-handicap into the plus figures."

In 2012, Grehan won the Irish Youths Amateur. He received a scholarship to play golf at Eastern Michigan University, beginning in January 2013. He said in 2024: "When I went out there, I'll never forget coming off the plane. I started in January and there was three-feet of snow. I was like, 'What am I doing here?'." While with the Eastern Michigan Eagles, Grehan won an individual collegiate title at the Firestone Invitational in October 2013, shooting 73-67-67 for a three-stroke victory. He left Eastern Michigan University after a year due to homesickness and the unfavourable winter weather. He then received a Paddy Harrington Scholarship to attend Maynooth University. He earned a degree in entrepreneurship from Maynooth.

Grehan won the 2015 East of Ireland Open. It was the first time in the event's 75-year history that it had been reduced to 54 holes, as heavy rain and wind gusts reaching 100 km/h (62 mph) made the course unplayable. He also won the 2015 South of Ireland Open. In February 2016, Grehan finished runner-up at the South African Stroke Play Championship. During the event, he shot a 10-under 62, which was his career-low round and broke the course record. Grehan also finished runner-up alongside Grant Forrest at the Scottish Amateur Stroke Play Championship in May 2016.

Grehan played for the Europe team which won the 2016 Arnold Palmer Cup. He also played for Ireland at the 2016 European Amateur Team Championship, and for Great Britain & Ireland at the 2016 St Andrews Trophy. Later that year, Grehan helped Ireland to win a bronze medal at the 2016 Eisenhower Trophy, which was the country's first medal in the competition.

In January 2017, Grehan was included in Great Britain & Ireland's 19-man initial lineup for the 2017 Walker Cup. At the time, he was ranked at 54th in the World Amateur Golf Ranking. He injured his elbow while playing football tennis with friends later in 2017, which sidelined him for multiple weeks and led to a downturn in form. In August 2017, Grehan won the Mullingar Scratch Cup. He was inspired to compete in the event by an after-dinner speech from past champion Paul McGinley. Grehan missed the cut at the 2017 U.S. Amateur and was not named to the final Walker Cup squad.

== Professional career ==
After missing out on the 2017 Walker Cup, Grehan turned professional and competed in European Tour Qualifying School. He missed the cut at first stage in October 2017. Grehan recorded his first professional win in February 2018 at the Palmares Classic, an event on the Portugal Pro Tour, and received €2,000. He shot 10-under to finish one stroke ahead of Max Orrin. Grehan played on the PGA EuroPro Tour in 2018. In his first event, he finished runner-up at the Motocaddy Masters in May 2018 and earned £6,000. Grehan received invites afterwards to events on the Challenge Tour, but had little success. He struggled in 2019, missing 10 cuts in 16 starts across the PGA EuroPro Tour and Challenge Tour.

Grehan's career was hindered by the COVID-19 pandemic. He recalled in 2024: "It was tough. Very, very tough. I remember trying to fly to Europe with three people on the plane, trying to do antigen tests before you fly and then at tournaments, doing antigen tests just after your round to fly home the next day and it was really expensive." Grehan missed 9 of 15 cuts in 2021 while in the midst of an attempt to change his swing, and said that he had considered giving up on his golf career at the end of 2021 due to financial concerns.

In 2022, Grehan had the best year of his professional career. He won the K Club Pro-Am in July, for which he received a career-high payout of €20,000. Grehan also won the Spey Valley Championship on the EuroPro Tour in September, which was his first victory in an Official World Golf Ranking-sanctioned event. He prevailed in a playoff for the title against Dermot McElroy and Michael Stewart. Later in September, the EuroPro Tour announced that it would fold at the conclusion of the 2022 PGA EuroPro Tour season. At the time, Grehan was seventh in the tour's order of merit, narrowly outside the top five rankings which would secure promotion to the Challenge Tour.

Grehan struggled in 2023. He registered only one top-10 finish on the Challenge Tour during the year and lost his status on the tour. He again considered ending his professional career as he and his wife were expecting their first child, but he decided to continue. In January 2024, Grehan totalled 9-under to win the first event of Swing 2 on the Winter Tour, one stroke ahead of Wouter De Vries. The following month, Grehan shot rounds of 63-62-62 to win on the Toro Tour, a mini-tour in Spain. His total of 26-under was 12 shots clear of runner-up Harvey Byers. Grehan finished second on the Winter Tour Order of Merit, which earned him an invitation to an event on the 2024 Challenge Tour schedule. He played on the 2024 Clutch Pro Tour and made his first Challenge Tour start of the year at the D+D Real Czech Challenge.

At the D+D Real Czech Challenge in October 2024, Grehan shot rounds of 68-67-67 to stand at 8-under through 54 holes, but was 14 strokes behind the leader and eventual champion Benjamin Follett-Smith. This was one of many "back in the pack" situations Grehan had experienced as a professional golfer. On the night after the third round, he filed an application for the reinstatement of his amateur status. He finished the tournament in tied-40th place at 12-under, earning around €1,500. He recalled: "If I had finished third or fourth that week my career earnings would have been enough that it would have taken me 12 months to get reinstated." As he did not finish inside the top four, he was eligible for amateur reinstatement after six months. Speaking on the decision to end his professional career, Grehan said in 2025: "I have asked myself many times where I fell short as a pro. Did I think I was good enough? Absolutely. And I still think I am. ... But I've no regrets. I gave it a good go and learned so much from it all."

== Reinstated amateur ==
Grehan's amateur status was reinstated in April 2025. He won the Irish Amateur Open Championship in May and the Irish Amateur Close in August 2025. In doing so, Grehan became the third man to win both titles in the same year, joining Pádraig Harrington (1995) and Peter O'Keeffe (2021). He was selected to represent Ireland at the 2025 European Amateur Team Championship, and was named to the Great Britain & Ireland team for the 2025 Walker Cup held at Cypress Point in September. He had a 1–2–1 record at the Walker Cup as the United States won by a score of 17–9.

In May 2026, Grehan won the East of Ireland Amateur Open, breaking the tournament record with a score of 17-under to claim a six-shot victory. As part of a final-round 65, he aced the 207-yard (189 m) par-3 17th hole at County Louth Golf Club.

Grehan won The Amateur Championship in June 2026. He defeated American Matt Moloney, 1 up, at Royal Liverpool Golf Club to win the title. With the victory, Grehan earned exemptions into the 2026 Open Championship, 2027 Masters Tournament and 2027 U.S. Open. He was the first Irishman to win the Amateur Championship since James Sugrue in 2019. When asked after the victory about leaving the professional ranks, Grehan said: "I love golf, I love competing. To be able to come back and play as an amateur while working also, it's the best of both worlds."

At the 2026 European Amateur Team Championship in July, Grehan represented the Ireland team which defeated the hosts Estonia in the final. This was Ireland's first victory in the competition since 2008. The following week, Grehan made his major championship debut at the 2026 Open Championship, where he shot rounds of 77–69 to miss the cut. He said afterwards: "I need to become a better putter." In September, Grehan played in the 2026 Walker Cup. He won both of his singles matches against Preston Stout, the number one in the World Amateur Golf Ranking, to help Great Britain & Ireland to victory by a score of 13 1/2–12 1/2. This was Great Britain & Ireland's first victory in the event since 2015.

== Personal life ==
Grehan married Carla Reynolds in 2023. They had their first child in June 2024. Grehan and his family live in Termonfeckin, County Louth. As of 2025, he works as a financial advisor with a firm in Dundalk.

== Amateur wins ==
- 2012 Irish Youths Amateur Close
- 2013 Firestone Invitational
- 2015 East of Ireland Amateur Open, South of Ireland Amateur Open
- 2017 R&A Foundation Scholars Tournament, Mullingar Scratch Trophy
- 2025 Irish Amateur Open Championship, Irish Amateur Close
- 2026 East of Ireland Amateur Open, The Amateur Championship

== Professional wins (5) ==
=== PGA EuroPro Tour wins (1) ===
No.	Date	Tournament	Winning score	Margin of victory	Runners-up
1	9 Sep 2022	Spey Valley Championship	−9 (67-66=133) (Note: Shortened to 36 holes due to weather.)	Playoff	(Northern Ireland) Dermot McElroy, (Scotland) Michael Stewart

=== Toro Tour wins (1) ===
No.	Date	Tournament	Winning score	Margin of victory	Runner-up
1	8 Feb 2024	Atalaya Golf 3	−26 (63-62-62=187)	12 strokes	(England) Harvey Byers

=== Portugal Pro Tour wins (1) ===
No.	Date	Tournament	Winning score	Margin of victory	Runner-up
1	20 Feb 2018	Palmares Classic VI	−10 (66-68=134)	1 stroke	(England) Max Orrin

=== Other wins (2) ===
- 2022 The K Club Pro-Am
- 2024 Winter Tour Swing 2 (Villa Padierna)

== Results in major championships ==
Tournament	2026
Masters Tournament	
PGA Championship	
U.S. Open	
The Open Championship	CUT

Did not play

CUT = missed the half-way cut

== Team appearances ==
- Arnold Palmer Cup (representing Europe): 2016 (winners), 2017
- European Amateur Team Championship (representing Ireland): 2016, 2017, 2025, 2026 (winners)
- St Andrews Trophy (representing Great Britain & Ireland): 2016, 2025 (winners)
- Eisenhower Trophy (representing Ireland): 2016, 2025
- Walker Cup (representing Great Britain & Ireland): 2025, 2026 (winners)
