= NCAA Division I men's golf tournament all-time individual records =

The following is a list of National Collegiate Athletic Association (NCAA) Division I college golf individual statistics and records through the 2026 NCAA Division I men's golf championship. The NCAA began sponsoring the national collegiate championship in 1939. Before that year the event was conducted by the National Intercollegiate Golf Association.

== Individual national championships ==
School(s)	Championships
Yale	13
Oklahoma State	11
Harvard, Houston	8
Princeton	7
Arizona State, Texas	6
Ohio State	5
Georgia Tech, Southern California	4
Florida, LSU, Michigan, Stanford, Tulsa, Wake Forest	3
Clemson, Georgetown, Illinois, Minnesota, Mississippi, UNLV, North Carolina, Oklahoma, Purdue, San Jose State	2

== Individual records ==
- Most individual championships: 3
  - Ben Crenshaw, Texas (1971, 1972, 1973)
  - Phil Mickelson, Arizona State (1989, 1990, 1992)
- Most consecutive individual championships: 3
  - Ben Crenshaw, Texas (1971–1973)
- Lowest score (in relation to par), one round: 60 (−12)
  - Nick Dunlap, Alabama, (2023, second round, Hamptons Intercollegiate)
- Lowest score (in relation to par), two rounds: 128 (−16)
  - Phil Mickelson, Arizona State (1992)
- Lowest score (in relation to par), three rounds: 196 (−20)
  - Charles Howell III, Oklahoma State (2000)
- Lowest score (in relation to par), four rounds: 265 (−23)
  - Charles Howell III, Oklahoma State (2000)
