= 2026 Presidents Cup =

Golf competition in Medinah, Illinois

- Dates: September 24–27
- Venue: Medinah Country Club; Course #3
- Location: Medinah, Illinois, U.S.
- Captains: Brandt Snedeker (USA); Geoff Ogilvy (International)
USA	17	13	International
- United States wins the Presidents Cup

Location map
- Location within the United States Location within Illinois

The 2026 Presidents Cup was the 16th edition of the Presidents Cup golf competition, which was held September 24 to 27 at Medinah Country Club in Medinah, Illinois, a suburb northwest of Chicago.

Team USA won the cup for the 11th consecutive time.

== Course layout ==
Medinah Country Club Course #3

Medinah went through a major course renovation in 2022 and 2023, by reworking their drainage, irrigation, greens and bunkers. The first 12 holes remained mostly unchanged, but two par 3's (holes 13 and 17) as well a short drivable par 4 (15th hole) were removed, which meant three new holes were introduced. The number of bunkers increased from 70 to 117, which more than doubled the total sand area. Most of the course fairways were straightened and narrowed, which meant the course would only have 48 acres of rough area. The green sizes increased over 40%.

For this Presidents Cup only, the course was rerouted, with rounds starting on what is normally hole 5, proceeding around the course in typical order and ending with the final four holes being 1, 2, 3 and 4. The PGA Tour wanted to ensure that the end of matches would see the water holes around Lake Kadijah.

Hole	1	2	3	4	5	6	7	8	9	Out	10	11	12	13	14	15	16	17	18	In	Total
Yards	489	476	582	373	479	646	209	510	153	3,917	455	514	402	217	487	436	211	430	479	3,631	7,548
Par	4	4	5	4	4	5	3	4	3	36	4	4	4	3	4	4	3	4	4	34	70

== Team qualification and selection ==
Both teams have 12 players.

Key
Top six on points list
Six captain's picks
Not available / not picked in top 15 of points list

=== United States team ===
The United States team features the six players who earned the most FedEx Cup points from the events from January 1, 2025 through August 23, 2026 BMW Championship and six captain's picks.

The final standings were:

Position	Player	Points
1	Scottie Scheffler	14,749
2	Cameron Young	7,889
3	Wyndham Clark	6,221
4	Sam Burns	6,148
5	Russell Henley	6,009
6	Collin Morikawa	5,614
7	Chris Gotterup	5,535
8	Ben Griffin	5,271
9	Xander Schauffele	5,034
10	J. J. Spaun	5,023
11	Justin Thomas	4,481
12	Jacob Bridgeman	4,385
13	Patrick Cantlay	4,226
14	Akshay Bhatia	4,180
15	Maverick McNealy	3,893
...		
48	Jackson Koivun	1,382

=== International team ===
The team is composed of the top six players from the Presidents Cup International Team Points List, which is based on the Official World Golf Ranking on August 30, 2026, and six captain's picks.

The final standings were:

Position	Player	Points
1	Kim Si-woo	4.8597
2	Ryan Fox	3.7725
3	Hideki Matsuyama	3.7635
4	Min Woo Lee	3.3955
5	Tom Kim	3.3543
6	Adam Scott	2.3332
7	Corey Conners	2.1626
8	Nico Echavarría	2.0053
9	Im Sung-jae	2.0011
10	Ryo Hisatsune	1.8868
11	Jason Day	1.8317
12	Casey Jarvis	1.7979
13	Nick Taylor	1.6362
14	Aldrich Potgieter	1.4516
15	Jayden Schaper	1.4306
...		
18	Christiaan Bezuidenhout	1.3856

== Teams ==
=== Captains ===
Brandt Snedeker is captain of the United States team while Geoff Ogilvy is captain of the International team. USA team captain's assistants are: Gary Woodland, Jim Furyk, Keegan Bradley and Webb Simpson. International team captain's assistants are: Tim Clark, Trevor Immelman, Taylor Pendrith and Camilo Villegas.

=== Players ===
United States team
Player	Age	Points rank	OWGR	Previous appearances	Matches	W–L–T	Winning percentage
Scottie Scheffler	30	1	1	2	9	3–5–1	38.89
Cameron Young	29	2	3	1	4	1–2–1	37.50
Wyndham Clark	32	3	5	1	4	1–2–1	37.50
Sam Burns	30	4	9	2	9	3–3–3	50.00
Russell Henley	37	5	6	1	4	3–1–0	75.00
Collin Morikawa	29	6	11	2	8	6–2–0	75.00
Chris Gotterup	27	7	7	0	Rookie		
Xander Schauffele	32	9	10	3	14	10–4–0	71.42
Justin Thomas	33	11	22	3	15	10–3–2	73.33
Jacob Bridgeman	26	12	29	0	Rookie		
Patrick Cantlay	34	13	27	3	13	10–4–0	71.42
Jackson Koivun	21	48	65	0	Rookie		

International team
Player	Country	Age	Points rank	OWGR	Previous appearances	Matches	W–L–T	Winning percentage
Kim Si-woo	South Korea	31	1	13	3	11	6–5–0	54.54
Ryan Fox	New Zealand	39	2	24	0	Rookie		
Hideki Matsuyama	Japan	34	3	26	6	27	9–13–5	42.59
Min Woo Lee	Australia	28	4	30	1	2	0–1–1	25.00
Tom Kim	South Korea	24	5	31	2	9	3–5–1	38.89
Adam Scott	Australia	46	6	52	11	51	20–25–6	45.09
Corey Conners	Canada	34	7	54	2	9	2–7–0	22.22
Nico Echavarría	Colombia	32	8	60	0	Rookie		
Im Sung-jae	South Korea	28	9	59	3	15	6–7–2	46.66
Ryo Hisatsune	Japan	23	10	66	0	Rookie		
Nick Taylor	Canada	38	13	81	0	Rookie		
Christiaan Bezuidenhout	South Africa	32	18	97	2	5	3–1–1	70.00

== Thursday's fourball matches ==
The US team took a 3–2 lead after the first day of play. Only the Scheffler/Burns vs. Lee/Im match went to the 18th hole.

International	Results	United States
Lee/Im	1 up	Scheffler/Burns
Matsuyama/Hisatsune	3 & 1	Young/Schauffele
Conners/Echavarría	4 & 3	Thomas/Koivun
Fox/Scott	3 & 2	Clark/Morikawa
T. Kim/S. W. Kim	3 & 2	Gotterup/Cantlay
2	Fourball	3
2	Overall	3

== Friday's foursomes matches ==
International	Results	United States
Conners/Taylor	1 up	Scheffler/Burns
Im/Matsuyama	3 & 2	Henley/Bridgeman
Fox/Lee	1 up	Morikawa/Clark
Scott/Bezuidenhout	3 & 2	Thomas/Young
T. Kim/S. W. Kim	4 & 3	Cantlay/Schauffele
5	Foursomes	0
7	Overall	3

== Saturday's matches ==
=== Morning fourball ===
International	Results	United States
Lee/Im	Tied	Thomas/Koivun
S. W. Kim/T. Kim	2 & 1	Morikawa/Clark
Taylor/Conners	2 & 1	Gotterup/Young
Matsuyama/Hisatsune	2 & 1	Scheffler/Burns
1.5	Fourball	2.5
8.5	Overall	5.5

=== Afternoon foursomes ===
International	Results	United States
T. Kim/S. W. Kim	2 & 1	Cantlay/Schauffele
Conners/Taylor	1 up	Henley/Bridgeman
Scott/Im	6 & 4	Young/Gotterup
Fox/Lee	3 & 2	Burns/Clark
2	Foursomes	2
10.5	Overall	7.5

== Sunday's singles matches ==
International	Results	United States	Timetable
Hisatsune	3 & 2	Young	1st: 10.5–8.5
T. Kim	3 & 2	Clark	3rd: 11.5–9.5
Conners	5 & 3	Thomas	2nd: 10.5–9.5
Echavarría	2 & 1	Scheffler	4th: 11.5– 10.5
Im	3 & 1	Burns	5th: 12.5–10.5
Bezuidenhout	1 up	Gotterup	6th: 12.5–11.5
Matsuyama	1 up	Morikawa	8th: 12.5–13.5
Scott	2 & 1	Cantlay	7th: 12.5–12.5
S. W. Kim	2 up	Koivun	9th: 12.5–14.5
Lee	1 up	Bridgeman	10th: 12.5–15.5
Taylor	Tied	Henley	12th: 13–17
Fox	2 & 1	Schauffele	11th: 12.5–16.5
2.5	Singles	9.5
13	Overall	17

== Individual player records ==
Each entry refers to the win–loss–tie record of the player.

=== United States ===
Player	Points	Overall	Singles	Foursomes	Fourballs
Jacob Bridgeman	1	1–2–0	1–0–0	0–2–0	0–0–0
Sam Burns	2	2–3–0	0–1–0	0–2–0	2–0–0
Patrick Cantlay	2	2–2–0	1–0–0	1–1–0	0–1–0
Wyndham Clark	1	1–4–0	0–1–0	0–2–0	1–1–0
Chris Gotterup	3	3–1–0	1–0–0	1–0–0	1–1–0
Russell Henley	0.5	0–2–1	0–0–1	0–2–0	0–0–0
Jackson Koivun	2.5	2–0–1	1–0–0	0–0–0	1–0–1
Collin Morikawa	2	2–2–0	1–0–0	0–1–0	1–1–0
Xander Schauffele	2	2–2–0	1–0–0	1–1–0	0–1–0
Scottie Scheffler	3	3–1–0	1–0–0	0–1–0	2–0–0
Justin Thomas	2.5	2–1–1	1–0–0	0–1–0	1–0–1
Cameron Young	3	3–2–0	1–0–0	1–1–0	1–1–0

=== International ===
Player	Points	Overall	Singles	Foursomes	Fourballs
Christiaan Bezuidenhout	1	1–1–0	0–1–0	1–0–0	0–0–0
Corey Conners	2	2–3–0	0–1–0	2–0–0	0–2–0
Nico Echavarría	0	0–2–0	0–1–0	0–0–0	0–1–0
Ryan Fox	2	2–2–0	0–1–0	2–0–0	0–1–0
Ryo Hisatsune	1	1–2–0	0–1–0	0–0–0	1–1–0
Im Sung-jae	2.5	2–2–1	1–0–0	1–1–0	0–1–1
Kim Si-woo	3	3–2–0	0–1–0	1–1–0	2–0–0
Tom Kim	4	4–1–0	1–0–0	1–1–0	2–0–0
Min Woo Lee	2.5	2–2–1	0–1–0	2–0–0	0–1–1
Hideki Matsuyama	2	2–2–0	0–1–0	1–0–0	1–1–0
Adam Scott	1	1–3–0	0–1–0	1–1–0	0–1–0
Nick Taylor	2.5	2–1–1	0–0–1	2–0–0	0–1–0
