= Luke Poulter =

English golfer (born 2004)

Personal information
- Nationality: England
- Born: 22 May 2004 (age 22)

Career
- Sport: Golf
- College: University of Florida
- Status: Amateur

Achievements and awards
- Orlando Sentinel Player of the Year: 2021
- Michael Carter 'Junior' Memorial Award: 2026

Luke Poulter (born 22 May 2004) is an English amateur golfer who currently plays on the Florida Gators men's golf team. He has won the 2025 St Andrews Trophy, 2025 Arnold Palmer Cup and 2026 Walker Cup, and 2026 rose to 4th in the World Amateur Golf Ranking.

== Early life ==
Poulter was born in England in 2004 and moved to the U.S. when he was around 4 years old. He was raised in Orlando, Florida.

== Amateur career ==
Poulter enrolled at the University of Florida in 2022 and joined the Florida Gators men's golf team in 2023. He won the 2025 Schenkel Invitational and 2026 NCAA Columbus Regional, and was selected for the Arnold Palmer Cup in 2025 and 2026.

In 2023, Poulter rose to prominence as he shot four under par to tie for 22nd at the International Series England event on the Asian Tour.

Poulter beat Thomas Higgins, 4 and 3, to help England win over Ireland 4–3 to secure a bronze at the 2025 European Amateur Team Championship.

At the 2025 Walker Cup, Poulter lost his Sunday singles match to Preston Stout by 2 and 1 as the United States won. In 2026, Poulter beat Ethan Fang, 3 and 1, to secure a crucial point in the first British victory in ten years as they won 13 1/2–12 1/2.

In 2026, Poulter rose to 4th in the World Amateur Golf Ranking and number two in Europe behind Tyler Weaver, to earn a silver medal in the European Amateur Golfer of the Year awards by the EGA.

== Personal life ==
Poulter is the son of Ryder Cup legend and twelve-time European Tour winner Ian Poulter.

== Amateur wins ==
- 2022 Willow Cup
- 2025 Schenkel Invitational
- 2026 NCAA Columbus Regional

== Team appearances ==
Amateur

- European Amateur Team Championship (representing England): 2025
- St Andrews Trophy (representing Great Britain & Ireland): 2025 (winners)
- Arnold Palmer Cup (representing International): 2025 (winners), 2026
- Walker Cup (representing Great Britain & Ireland): 2025, 2026 (winners)

== See also ==
- List of Great Britain and Ireland Walker Cup golfers
- List of International Arnold Palmer Cup golfers
