= 2025 Walker Cup =

Golf tournament

50th Walker Cup Match
- Dates: September 6–7, 2025
- Venue: Cypress Point Club
- Location: Pebble Beach, California, U.S.
- Captains: Nathan Smith (USA); Dean Robertson (GB&I)
(United States)	17	9	(United Kingdom) (Republic of Ireland)
- United States wins the Walker Cup

Location map
- Location in the United States Location in California

The 50th Walker Cup Match was held September 6–7, 2025, in the United States at Cypress Point Club in Pebble Beach, California. The match, which is contested between amateur male golfers from the United States against Great Britain and Ireland. The United States won 17 points to 9.

== Format ==
On Saturday, were four matches of foursomes in the morning and eight singles matches in the afternoon. On Sunday, there were again four matches of foursomes in the morning, followed by ten singles matches (involving every player) in the afternoon. In all, 26 matches were played.

Each of the 26 matches was worth one point in the larger team competition. If a match was all square after the 18th hole extra holes are not played. Rather, each side earned 1/2 a point toward their team total. The team that accumulated at least 13 1/2 points won the competition. In the event of a tie, the previous winner retained the Cup.

== Teams ==
=== U.S. team ===
USA
Name	Rank	Age	Notes
Nathan Smith		47	non-playing captain
Ethan Fang	3	21
Stewart Hagestad	44	34	Played in 2017, 2019, 2021, 2023
Mason Howell	143	18
Ben James	2	21	Played in 2023
Jackson Koivun	1	20
Michael La Sasso	9	22
Jacob Modleski	13	20
Tommy Morrison	6	21
Preston Stout	5	21
Jase Summy	4	21

=== Great Britain and Ireland team ===
& Great Britain & Ireland
Name	Rank	Age	Notes
(Scotland) Dean Robertson		43	non-playing captain
(Scotland) Cameron Adam	17	22
(England) Eliot Baker	104	22
(England) Dominic Clemons	35	23
(England) Charlie Forster	52	22
(Scotland) Connor Graham	42	18	Played in 2023
(Republic of Ireland) Stuart Grehan	149	32
(England) Luke Poulter	27	21
(Scotland) Niall Shiels Donegan	63	20
(Republic of Ireland) Gavin Tiernan	465	19
(England) Tyler Weaver	10	20

Note: "Rank" is the World Amateur Golf Ranking as of the start of the Cup.

== Saturday's matches ==
=== Morning foursomes ===
&	Results
Graham/Weaver	(United Kingdom) (Republic of Ireland) 3 & 1	Koivun/Morrison
Forster/Poulter	(United Kingdom) (Republic of Ireland) 3 & 2	Hagestad/James
Baker/Grehan	(United Kingdom) (Republic of Ireland) 1 up	Fang/Stout
Adam/Clemons	(United States) 4 & 2	La Sasso/Summy
3	Foursomes	1
3	Overall	1

=== Afternoon singles ===
&	Results
Tyler Weaver	(United States) 4 & 3	Jackson Koivun
Niall Shiels Donegan	(United Kingdom) (Republic of Ireland) 1 up	Jacob Modleski
Luke Poulter	(United States) 3 & 2	Mason Howell
Connor Graham	(United Kingdom) (Republic of Ireland) 3 & 2	Ben James
Gavin Tiernan	(United States) 7 & 5	Stewart Hagestad
Stuart Grehan	halved	Ethan Fang
Charlie Forster	(United States) 6 & 5	Preston Stout
Eliot Baker	(United States) 1 up	Jase Summy
2 1/2	Singles	5 1/2
5 1/2	Overall	6 1/2

== Sunday's matches ==
=== Morning foursomes ===
&	Results
Graham/Weaver	(United States) 1 up	Koivun/Morrison
Forster/Poulter	(United Kingdom) (Republic of Ireland) 1 up	Fang/Stout
Baker/Grehan	(United States) 2 & 1	Howell/Modleski
Adam/Shiels Donegan	(United Kingdom) (Republic of Ireland) 2 & 1	La Sasso/Summy
2	Foursomes	2
7 1/2	Overall	8 1/2

=== Afternoon singles ===
&	Results
Tyler Weaver	(United States) 3 & 2	Jackson Koivun
Niall Shiels Donegan	(United States) 3 & 2	Tommy Morrison
Connor Graham	halved	Mason Howell
Luke Poulter	(United States) 2 & 1	Preston Stout
Stuart Grehan	(United States) 5 & 4	Ethan Fang
Eliot Baker	(United States) 4 & 3	Stewart Hagestad
Charlie Forster	(United States) 1 up	Ben James
Cameron Adam	(United States) 3 & 1	Jase Summy
Gavin Tiernan	(United Kingdom) (Republic of Ireland) 2 & 1	Michael La Sasso
Dominic Clemons	(United States) 1 up	Jacob Modleski
1 1/2	Singles	8 1/2
9	Overall	17
