= Michael La Sasso =

American professional golfer (born 2004)

Personal information
- Nationality: United States
- Born: March 25, 2004 (age 22) Raleigh, North Carolina, U.S.

Career
- Sport: Golf
- College: North Carolina State University; University of Mississippi
- Turned professional: 2026
- Current tour: LIV Golf
- Professional wins: 1

Number of wins by tour
- LIV Golf: 1

Best results in major championships
- Masters Tournament: DNP
- PGA Championship: DNP
- U.S. Open: CUT: 2025
- The Open Championship: DNP

Michael La Sasso (born March 25, 2004) is an American professional golfer who plays on the LIV Golf League. He won the 2025 NCAA Championship and 2026 LIV Golf Indianapolis.

== Early life and collegiate career ==
La Sasso attended and played golf at St. David's School in Raleigh, North Carolina. He played his first year of college golf at North Carolina State University and then moved to the University of Mississippi ahead of his sophomore year. As a senior in 2024–25, he recorded the lowest scoring average in a single season in Ole Miss Rebels history of 69.48, and was named First Team All-American.

La Sasso won the 2025 NCAA Championship, the second player in school history to lift the individual trophy, after Braden Thornberry in 2017. He made his major championship debut at the 2025 U.S. Open where he missed the cut after carding two rounds of 74 at Oakmont Country Club. He appeared in five further PGA Tour events in 2025, making the cut at the 3M Open.

He won the 2024 Arnold Palmer Cup and the 2025 Walker Cup playing for the U.S. national team.

== Professional career ==
On January 20, 2026, LIV Golf announced that La Sasso had turned professional and joined HyFlyers captained by Phil Mickelson. By turning pro, La Sasso forfeited his invitation to the 2026 Masters Tournament, which he earned as the individual NCAA champion.

La Sasso shot a second round 60 on his way to win the 2026 season finale, LIV Golf Indianapolis, fending off Jon Rahm in second and Bryson DeChambeau in third to become the youngest winner on the tour.

== Amateur wins ==
- 2022 The Carolinian
- 2024 Hamptons Intercollegiate
- 2025 Old Waverly Collegiate Championship, NCAA Championship

== Professional wins (1) ==
=== LIV Golf League wins (1) ===
No.	Date	Tournament	Winning score	Margin of victory	Runner-up
1	Aug 23, 2026	LIV Golf Indianapolis	−18 (71-60-66-65=262)	1 stroke	(Spain) Jon Rahm

== U.S. national team appearances ==
- Arnold Palmer Cup: 2024 (winners), 2025
- Walker Cup: 2025 (winners)

== See also ==
- List of American Arnold Palmer Cup golfers
- List of American Walker Cup golfers
