= Stewart Hagestad =

American golfer

Personal information
- Full name: John Stewart Hagestad III
- Nationality: United States
- Born: April 10, 1991 (age 35) Newport Beach, California, U.S.
- Height: 6 ft 5 in (1.96 m)

Career
- Sport: Golf
- College: University of Southern California
- Status: Amateur

Best results in major championships
- Masters Tournament: T36: 2017
- PGA Championship: DNP
- U.S. Open: 64th: 2022
- The Open Championship: DNP
Medal record
Pan American Games
Gold medal – first place	2019 Lima	Mixed team

John Stewart Hagestad III (born April 10, 1991) is an American amateur golfer.

== Golf career ==
Hagestad played his college golf for the USC Trojans.

Hagestad won the 2016 U.S. Mid-Amateur at Stonewall, in Elverson, Pennsylvania, earning a spot at the 2017 Masters Tournament. He became the first U.S. Mid-Amateur champion qualifier to make the cut at the Masters (Jay Sigel was 1987 Mid-Amateur champion and made the cut at the 1988 Masters Tournament, but at the time the Mid-Amateur champion did not receive an invite and Sigel qualified by playing for the United States in the Walker Cup). Hagestad finished in a tie for 36th place, and won the Silver Cup as the lowest-scoring amateur. Despite his performance, he stated that he has no desire to turn professional.

Hagestad also won the 2016 Metropolitan Amateur. He competed in the U.S. Open in 2017, 2018, 2019, and 2022.

Hagestad teamed with Emilia Migliaccio, Brandon Wu, and Rose Zhang to win the mixed team gold medal at the 2019 Pan American Games. He finished 13th in the men's individual competition.

Hagestad claimed a second U.S. Mid-Amateur title in 2021 and a third in 2023.

== Amateur wins ==
- 2009 Scott Robertson Memorial (Boys 15–18)
- 2016 Metropolitan Amateur, U.S. Mid-Amateur
- 2021 George C Thomas Invitational – Mid-Amateur, U.S. Mid-Amateur
- 2022 George L Coleman Invitational – Mid-Amateur
- 2023 U.S. Mid-Amateur, Crump Cup Memorial Tournament
- 2024 Azalea Invitational
- 2026 Crump Cup Memorial Tournament

== Results in major championships ==
Tournament	2017	2018
Masters Tournament	T36LA	
U.S. Open	CUT	CUT
The Open Championship		
PGA Championship		

Tournament	2019	2020	2021	2022	2023	2024
Masters Tournament				CUT		CUT
PGA Championship						
U.S. Open	CUT			64		CUT
The Open Championship		NT				

Did not play

LA = Low amateur
CUT = missed the half-way cut
"T" = tied for place
NT = no tournament due to COVID-19 pandemic

== U.S. national team appearances ==
Amateur

- Walker Cup: 2017 (winners), 2019 (winners), 2021 (winners), 2023 (winners), 2025 (winners), 2026
