= Ben Hogan Award =

Annual U.S. college golf award

- Description: Annual prize given to the best college golf player in the United States
- Country: United States
- Presented by: Friends of Golf / Golf Coaches Association of America

The Ben Hogan Award is an annual prize given by Friends of Golf and the Golf Coaches Association of America, since 1990, to the best college golf player in the United States. The award is named in memory of Ben Hogan, an American professional golfer who is generally considered to be one of the greatest players in history.

The Colonial Country Club in Fort Worth, Texas joined the organization in 2001. Since 2005, the award winner is named at a ceremony prior to the Charles Schwab Challenge at Colonial and is invited to the following year's tournament.

== Winners ==
Year	College	Winner
2026	Auburn	Jackson Koivun
2025	Florida State	Luke Clanton
2024	Auburn	Jackson Koivun
2023	Texas Tech	Ludvig Åberg
2022	Texas Tech	Ludvig Åberg
2021	Florida State	John Pak
2020	Pepperdine	Sahith Theegala
2019	Oklahoma State	Viktor Hovland
2018	Texas	Doug Ghim
2017	Stanford	Maverick McNealy
2016	Arizona State	Jon Rahm
2015	Arizona State	Jon Rahm
2014	Stanford	Patrick Rodgers
2013	Washington	Chris Williams
2012	UCLA	Patrick Cantlay
2011	Oklahoma State	Peter Uihlein
2010	Washington	Nick Taylor
2009	Clemson	Kyle Stanley
2008	Oklahoma State	Rickie Fowler
2007	Georgia	Chris Kirk
2006	Florida	Matt Every
2005	UNLV	Ryan Moore
2004	Wake Forest	Bill Haas
2003	Arizona; Oklahoma State	Ricky Barnes; Hunter Mahan
2002	Clemson	D. J. Trahan
2001	New Mexico	Wil Collins
2000	Oklahoma	Chris James
1999	Nebraska	Steve Friesen
1998	Ball State	Jamie Broce
1997	Texas	Jeff Fahrenbruch
1996	North Carolina	Mark Wilson
1995	Oklahoma State	Trip Kuehne
1994	Auburn	William Blackmon
1993	Alabama	Mårten Olander
1992	Gustavus Adolphus	Jon Lindquist
1991	Kent State	Brian Bridges
1990	Oklahoma State	Kevin Wentworth

== See also ==
- Haskins Award
