= Jackson Koivun =

American professional golfer (born 2005)

Personal information
- Nationality: United States
- Born: May 23, 2005 (age 21) San Jose, California, U.S.
- Height: 5 ft 10 in (178 cm)

Career
- Sport: Golf
- College: Auburn University
- Turned professional: 2026
- Current tour: PGA Tour
- Professional wins: 1
- Highest ranking: 57 (September 20, 2026) (as of October 25, 2026)

Number of wins by tour
- PGA Tour: 1

Best results in major championships
- Masters Tournament: DNP
- PGA Championship: DNP
- U.S. Open: T23: 2026
- The Open Championship: DNP

Achievements and awards
- SEC Athlete of the Year: 2026
- SEC Player of the Year: 2024, 2025, 2026
- Haskins Award: 2024, 2026
- Ben Hogan Award: 2024, 2026
- Jack Nicklaus Award: 2024, 2026
- Mark H. McCormack Medal: 2025
- Phil Mickelson Outstanding Freshman Award: 2024

Jackson Koivun (born May 23, 2005) is an American professional golfer who plays on the PGA Tour. He won his first PGA Tour event at the 3M Open in 2026, and was a member of the victorious United States team at the 2026 Presidents Cup. Koivun previously played college golf at Auburn University, where he won two NCAA team championships and three consecutive individual SEC championships.

At Auburn, Koivun won 11 individual tournaments and was named SEC Player of the Year three times. As a freshman in 2024, he became the first player to sweep the Haskins Award, Jack Nicklaus Award, Ben Hogan Award and Phil Mickelson Award in the same season. He later became the first golfer to win the Haskins, Nicklaus and Hogan awards twice.

== Early life ==
Koivun was born on May 23, 2005, in San Jose, California and moved to Chapel Hill, North Carolina when he was in high school. He learned golf from his father George at a young age, and says he beat his dad for the first time when he was seven.

== Amateur career ==
In AJGA events, Koivun lost a playoff in 2021 and won the 2022 Rolex Tournament of Champions. He won the 2022 Junior Presidents Cup with the U.S. national team.

Koivun was the top-ranked recruit in the class of 2023. He enrolled at Auburn University and started playing with the Auburn Tigers men's golf team, where he as a freshman in 2024 recorded one of the best seasons in collegiate golf history. He won the SEC Championship by six shots and only finished outside the top-six once in 13 starts, and had the lowest adjusted scoring average (67.3) in the NCAA. He finished in a tie for second at the 2024 NCAA Division I Men's Individual Championship, and led the Auburn team to win the national title, the first in program history.

He was 7–0 in matchplay over the season, leading Auburn to 10 tournament victories, and was named Southeastern Conference Freshman of the Year and Player of the Year. He became the first player to win all four major collegiate awards, the Haskins Award, Jack Nicklaus Award, Ben Hogan Award and Phil Mickelson Award, in the same season.

Koivun made his PGA Tour debut in the 2024 Memorial Tournament at Muirfield Village, having earned a spot through winning the Jack Nicklaus Award. He made the cut and earned his 15th point in the PGA Tour University Accelerated Program, five points shy of the 20-points that will earn him a PGA Tour card and join Gordon Sargent, the first golfer to reach the threshold.

Following his freshman season with Auburn University, Koivun was the third-ranked player in the World Amateur Golf Ranking, behind Gordon Sargent, and Christo Lamprecht.

In February 2026, Koivun won the Amer Ari Invitational with rounds of 62, 62 and 67 for a 25-under par score. Koivun broke Auburn's 54-hole scoring record by seven strokes and his back-to-back 62s (−10) on Thursday and Friday, broke the NCAA 36-hole record of 18 shots under par, previously set by Tiger Woods at the 1996 Pac-10 Championship. He was also the first player in NCAA history to post two rounds of 62 or lower in the same event. One week later, Koivun won the Gator Invitational for his seventh career college victory, the most of any golfer in Auburn's history. In March, Koivun won The Hayt for his third win in four starts. In April, Koivun won the Mason Rudolph Championship, the Ford Collegiate, and the SEC Championship for the third straight year. Koivun became just the second golfer to win three straight SEC titles, joining LSU's Mac McLendon, who accomplished the feat from 1965 to 1967. Koivun finished at 19-under 191, an SEC scoring record and tying himself from earlier in 2026 at the Amer Ari Invitational for the third-lowest total score in college golf history. In May, Koivun was named the Ben Hogan Award winner for the second time, joining Jon Rahm and Ludvig Aberg as the third men’s golfer to win it twice. In June, Koivun was named the Haskins Award winner for the second time, joining Ben Crenshaw, Bobby Clampett and Phil Mickelson as just the fourth player to ever win the award twice. Koivun would later help Auburn win their second NCAA Championship in three years as they defeated UCLA in the final.

== Professional career ==
In June 2026, Koivun announced that he would forgo his senior year at Auburn University and turn professional following the 2026 U.S. Open. He had earned PGA Tour status through the PGA Tour University accelerated program the previous year. By turning pro, he forfeited his exemption to the 2026 Open Championship for winning the Mark H. McCormack Medal.

Koivun made his professional debut at the 2026 John Deere Classic, where he missed the cut.

In July 2026, in just his third professional start, Koivun won the 3M Open for his first PGA Tour victory. In the third round, Koivun shot a 10-under 61, including a tournament record 28 on the back nine, to go into the final round with a three shot lead. In the final round, Koivun closed with a bogey-free 5-under 66 to win the tournament by three over world No. 1 Scottie Scheffler. Koivun finished with a 72-hole tournament record score of 25-under 259. Koivun finished 70th in the FedEx Cup after the Wyndham Championship, the last position for the playoffs.

In September, Koivun was selected as a captain's picks to be on the U.S. Presidents Cup team, becoming the first golfer since Jordan Spieth in 2013 to start a year without a tour card and play in the Presidents Cup. He helped the U.S win the Presidents Cup and was the only undefeated U.S. player during the competition.

== Amateur wins ==
- 2019 UHY St. Louis Junior
- 2021 Northern California Junior Championship, Jack Burke Jr. Invitational
- 2022 Rolex Tournament of Champions
- 2023 Dustin Johnson World Junior Championship
- 2024 Wake Forest Invitational, SEC Championship, Inverness Intercollegiate
- 2025 SEC Golf Championship Stroke Play, NCAA Auburn Regional
- 2026 Amer Ari Invitational, Gators Invitational, The Hayt, Mason Rudolph Championship, Ford Collegiate, SEC Golf Championship Stroke Play

== Professional wins (1) ==
=== PGA Tour wins (1) ===
No.	Date	Tournament	Winning score	Margin of victory	Runner-up
1	Jul 26, 2026	3M Open	−25 (64-68-61-66=259)	3 strokes	(United States) Scottie Scheffler

== Results in major championships ==
Tournament	2025	2026
Masters Tournament		
PGA Championship		
U.S. Open	CUT	T23LA
The Open Championship		

Did not play

LA = low amateur
CUT = missed the half-way cut
"T" = tied

== U.S. national team appearances ==
- Junior Presidents Cup: 2022 (winners)
- Arnold Palmer Cup: 2024 (winners), 2025
- Walker Cup: 2025 (winners)

Professional

- Presidents Cup: 2026 (winners)
