= Mark H. McCormack Medal =

Amateur golf award

The Mark H. McCormack Medal is presented annually by The Royal and Ancient Golf Club of St Andrews to the leading player in the World Amateur Golf Ranking after the last 'elite' event of the season. The award is named after World Golf Hall of Famer Mark McCormack, who was a supporter of golf and the founder of IMG.

In 2011, New Zealand's Lydia Ko was awarded the first ever women's Mark H. McCormack Medal, a trophy she retained in 2012 and 2013.

Beginning in 2012, the previous year's men's winner receives an invitation to both the U.S. Open and The Open Championship provided he remains an amateur.

== Winners ==
=== Men ===
The medal is awarded to the male player ranked number one in the World Amateur Golf Ranking the week after the U.S. Amateur or the European Amateur whichever finishes last.

Year	Winner	Country
2026	Preston Stout	United States
2025	Jackson Koivun	United States
2024	Luke Clanton	United States
2023	Gordon Sargent	United States
2022	Keita Nakajima	Japan
2021	Keita Nakajima	Japan
2020	Takumi Kanaya	Japan
2019	Cole Hammer	United States
2018	Braden Thornberry	United States
2017	Joaquín Niemann	Chile
2016	Maverick McNealy	United States
2015	Jon Rahm	Spain
2014	Ollie Schniederjans	United States
2013	Matt Fitzpatrick	England
2012	Chris Williams	United States
2011	Patrick Cantlay	United States
2010	Peter Uihlein	United States
2009	Nick Taylor	Canada
2008	Danny Lee	New Zealand
2007	Colt Knost	United States

=== Women ===
The medal is awarded to the female player ranked number one in the World Amateur Golf Ranking the week after the U.S. Women's Amateur, the last elite women's WAGR event of the season.

Year	Winner	Country
2026	Kiara Romero	United States
2025	Kiara Romero	United States
2024	Lottie Woad	England
2023	Ingrid Lindblad	Sweden
2022	Rose Zhang	United States
2021	Rose Zhang	United States
2020	Rose Zhang	United States
2019	Andrea Lee	United States
2018	Jennifer Kupcho	United States
2017	Leona Maguire	Ireland
2016	Leona Maguire	Ireland
2015	Leona Maguire	Ireland
2014	Minjee Lee	Australia
2013	Lydia Ko	New Zealand
2012	Lydia Ko	New Zealand
2011	Lydia Ko	New Zealand
