= Haskins Award =

Annual US collegiate golf award

The Haskins Award is presented annually by the Haskins Commission to honor the most outstanding collegiate golfer in the United States. The award is named in memory of Fred Haskins, former golf teaching professional at the Country Club of Columbus (Georgia). Votes are tabulated by the Haskins Commission from select writers, golf coaches, and collegiate golfers. It is college golf's equivalent to college football's Heisman Trophy.

== Winners ==
Year	College	Winner
2026	Auburn (2)	Jackson Koivun (2)
2025	North Carolina (2)	David Ford
2024	Auburn	Jackson Koivun
2023	Texas Tech	Ludvig Åberg
2022	Oklahoma	Chris Gotterup
2021	Florida State	John Pak
2020	Pepperdine	Sahith Theegala
2019	Oklahoma State (8)	Matthew Wolff
2018	Oregon	Norman Xiong
2017	Ole Miss	Braden Thornberry
2016	Texas (7)	Beau Hossler
2015	Stanford (3)	Maverick McNealy
2014	Stanford (2)	Patrick Rodgers
2013	California	Michael Kim
2012	Alabama	Justin Thomas
2011	UCLA (2)	Patrick Cantlay
2010	Georgia	Russell Henley
2009	N.C. State	Matt Hill
2008	UCLA	Kevin Chappell
2007	So. California (3)	Jamie Lovemark
2006	Oklahoma State (7)	Pablo Martín
2005	UNLV	Ryan Moore
2004	Wake Forest (3)	Bill Haas
2003	Oklahoma State (6)	Hunter Mahan
2002	UAB	Graeme McDowell
2001	Georgia Tech (4)	Bryce Molder
2000	Oklahoma State (5)	Charles Howell III
1999	Northwestern	Luke Donald
1998	Georgia Tech	Matt Kuchar
1997	Texas (6)	Brad Elder
1996	Stanford	Tiger Woods
1995	Georgia Tech	Stewart Cink
1994	Texas	Justin Leonard
1993	Georgia Tech	David Duval
1992	Arizona State (3)	Phil Mickelson (3)
1991	Arizona State (2)	Phil Mickelson (2)
1990	Arizona State	Phil Mickelson
1989	Arizona	Robert Gamez
1988	Texas	Bob Estes
1987	Arizona State	Billy Mayfair
1986	Oklahoma State (4)	Scott Verplank
1985	So. California (2)	Sam Randolph
1984	North Carolina	John Inman
1983	Furman	Brad Faxon
1982	Oklahoma State (3)	Willie Wood
1981	Oklahoma State (2)	Bob Tway
1980	Brigham Young (2)	Bobby Clampett (2)
1979	Brigham Young	Bobby Clampett
1978	Oklahoma State	Lindy Miller
1977	So. California	Scott Simpson
1976	Florida	Phil Hancock
1975	Wake Forest (2)	Jay Haas
1974	Wake Forest	Curtis Strange
1973	Texas (3)	Ben Crenshaw (3)
1972	Texas (2)	Ben Crenshaw (2)
1971	Texas	Ben Crenshaw

== See also ==
- Ben Hogan Award
