= Mason Howell =

American amateur golfer (born 2007)

Personal information
- Nationality: United States
- Born: June 28, 2007 (age 19) Moultrie, Georgia, U.S.
- Height: 6 ft 4 in (193 cm)

Career
- Sport: Golf
- College: Georgia
- Status: Amateur

Best results in major championships
- Masters Tournament: CUT: 2026
- PGA Championship: DNP
- U.S. Open: CUT: 2025, 2026
- The Open Championship: CUT: 2026

Mason Howell (born June 28, 2007) is an American golfer. He won the 2025 U.S. Amateur, becoming the third-youngest winner in the history of the tournament. He also qualified for the 2025 U.S. Open and competed at the 2025 Walker Cup.

== Early years ==
Howell was born on June 28, 2007, in Moultrie, Georgia, where he grew up. His father was a tennis player at Valdosta State University. Howell became interested in golf at a young age, watching the PGA Tour on television at age two or three. At age four, he dressed as golfer Bobby Jones for Halloween, and the next year he received his first set of clubs. He started competing in tournaments at age six. He also competed in tennis, baseball and table tennis as he grew up, but decided to concentrate on golf at age 12.

Howell attended the Maclay School in Tallahassee, Florida, where, in sixth grade, he became a member of the golf varsity team, which included players up to six years older than himself. He later attended the Brookwood School in Thomasville, Georgia where he became the GIAA Class AAA state champion in individual play and also won a team state title. Howell broke the course record at the Glen Arven Country Club at age 14, finishing in 59 strokes. He was champion of the Future Masters tournament in the 13-14 category in 2022 and then became champion of the Billy Horschel Junior Championship in 2023.

== Amateur career ==
Howell competed at the U.S. Junior Amateur in 2022, 2023, 2024, and 2025, reaching matchplay in 2024 while medaling at the 2025 event.

In June 2025, Howell went 18-under 126 and was a medalist at the Atlanta qualifier for the 2025 U.S. Open, becoming one of five to qualify for the Open at the Atlanta event. He became the youngest player in the 2025 Open field, though he ultimately missed the cut. In August, he beat Jackson Herrington, 7 and 6, to win the 2025 U.S. Amateur, becoming the third-youngest winner of the tournament in its history, a title previously held by Tiger Woods. His victory gave him invitations to the Masters Tournament, the U.S. Open and The Open Championship in 2026. A month after his U.S. Amateur title, Howell helped the U.S. to a victory at the 2025 Walker Cup, going unbeaten in his three matches.

In September 2024, Howell announced his commitment to play golf in college for the Georgia Bulldogs. He is set to compete at Georgia starting in the fall of 2026.

== Amateur wins ==
- 2023 Billy Horschel Junior Championship
- 2025 U.S. Amateur

== Results in major championships ==
Tournament	2025	2026
Masters Tournament		CUT
PGA Championship		
U.S. Open	CUT	CUT
The Open Championship		CUT

Did not play

CUT = missed the halfway cut

== U.S. national team appearances ==
- Walker Cup: 2025
- Eisenhower Trophy: 2025
