= Nick Taylor (golfer) =

Canadian professional golfer (born 1988)

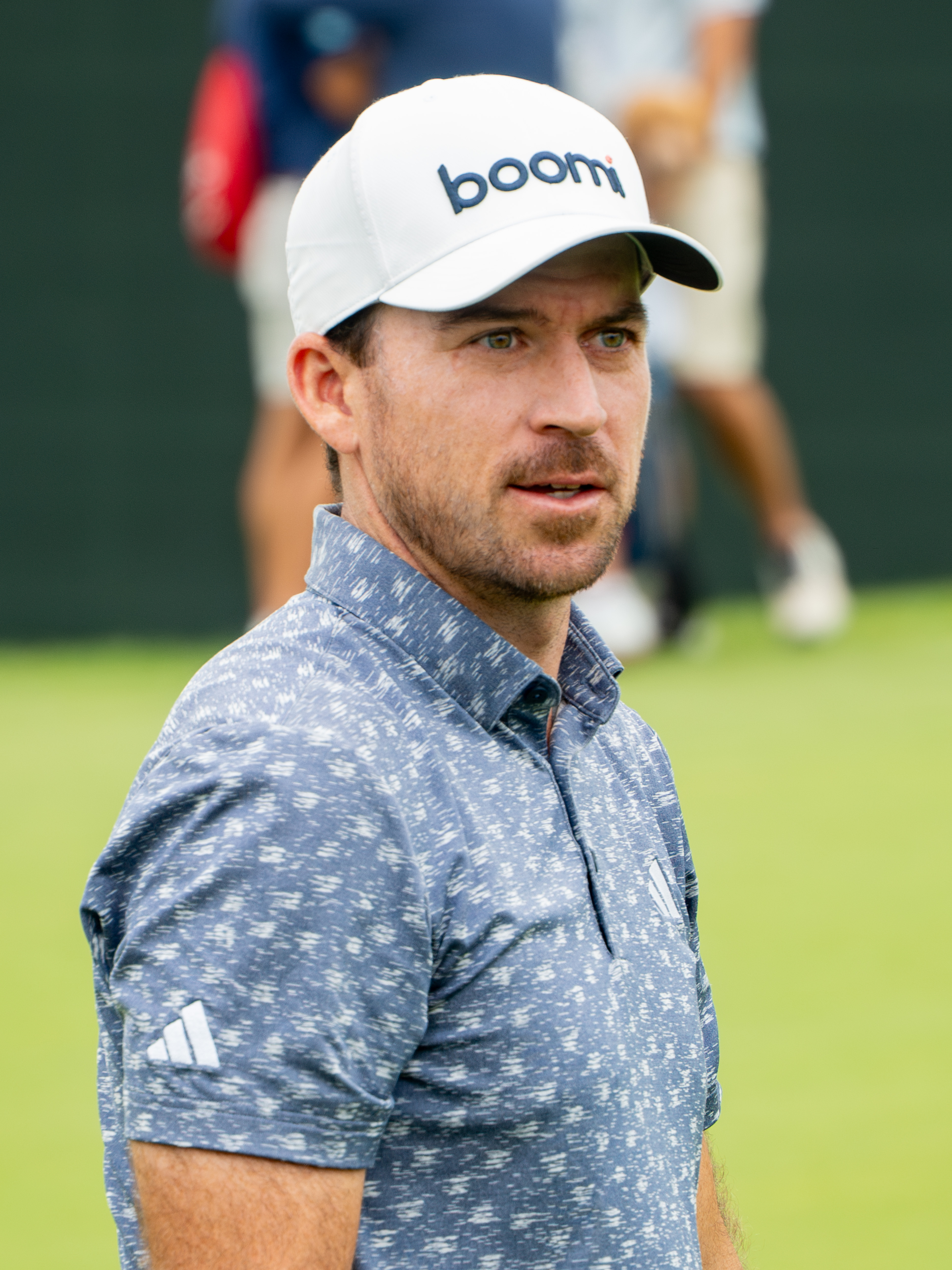
- Taylor at the 2025 Travelers Championship

Personal information
- Full name: Nicholas Alexander Bruce Taylor
- Nationality: Canada
- Born: April 14, 1988 (age 38) Winnipeg, Manitoba, Canada
- Height: 5 ft 10 in (178 cm)
- Spouse: Andie

Career
- Sport: Golf
- College: University of Washington
- Turned professional: 2010
- Current tour: PGA Tour
- Former tours: Web.com Tour; Gateway Tour
- Professional wins: 6
- Highest ranking: 24 (March 17, 2024) (as of October 25, 2026)

Number of wins by tour
- PGA Tour: 5
- Other: 1

Best results in major championships
- Masters Tournament: T29: 2020
- PGA Championship: T26: 2026
- U.S. Open: T23: 2025
- The Open Championship: T59: 2026

Achievements and awards
- Mark H. McCormack Medal: 2009
- Ben Hogan Award: 2010

Nicholas Alexander Bruce Taylor (born April 14, 1988) is a Canadian professional golfer who plays on the PGA Tour. After turning professional in 2010, Taylor has won on the PGA Tour five times, including becoming the first Canadian to win the Canadian Open since 1954, which he did in 2023 at the Oakdale Golf & Country Club.

Taylor had strong junior, collegiate, and amateur careers, winning the 2007 Canadian Amateur Championship at the age of 19, the top 8 of the 2007 U.S. Amateur, and finishing as a runner-up in the 2008 NCAA Division I Men's Golf Championship. He was a two-time All American and Pac-10 Golfer of the Year for the University of Washington Huskies. As an amateur in the 2009 U.S. Open, Taylor carded the lowest amateur round in U.S. Open history with a second round 65, finishing tied for 36th with the honour of the low amateur of the major. He was awarded the 2009 Mark H. McCormack Medal as the leading player in the World Amateur Golf Ranking, and the 2010 Ben Hogan Award as the best college golf player in the United States.

Taylor played on PGA Tour Canada from 2011 to 2013, and on the Web.com Tour before graduating to the PGA Tour in 2014. In his inaugural PGA Tour season he won the 2014 Sanderson Farms Championship, and picked up his second win in the 2020 AT&T Pebble Beach Pro-Am.

== Early life and amateur career ==
Taylor was born in Winnipeg, Manitoba and moved to Abbotsford, British Columbia when he was three. His home golf course is Ledgeview Golf and Country Club where he started golfing at the age of 10. Taylor attended Yale Secondary School, where he and his teammates won back to back provincial championships. Afterwards he attended the University of Washington on a golf scholarship where he graduated with a degree in economics.

In 2007, at the age of 19, Taylor won the Canadian Amateur Championship at the Riverside Country Club in Saskatoon, defeating Michael Knight in two playoff holes. At the 2007 U.S. Amateur at the Olympic Club, Taylor won the 51st seed and advanced through three rounds of the tournament, including defeating future PGA golfer Jamie Lovemark. Taylor was defeated in the quarter-finals by eventual champion Colt Knost.

In the May 2008 NCAA Division I Men's Golf Championship, Taylor finished tied for second in the individual competition with Jorge Campillo, three strokes back of champion Kevin Chappell. Taylor's Washington Husky's team finished in seventh place. He was named an Honorable Mention for the GCAA Division I PING All-America Team. In 2008, Taylor qualified for the U.S. Open, in which he missed the cut by three strokes. In the July 2009 U.S. Amateur Public Links, Taylor finished as the runner-up to Brad Benjamin. He also finished T53 at the 2008 RBC Canadian Open with a final score of −1. In the 2008 Canadian Amateur, Taylor finished in ninth place with a final score of −2.

In the May 2009 NCAA Division I Men's Golf Championship, Taylor finished the individual competition tied for ninth place, while his Washington Husky's team finished tied for third place. He was named on the Division I GCAA All-America Team with future PGA golfers Rickie Fowler and Billy Horschel. He qualified for the 2009 U.S. Open at Bethpage Black, where he made the cut, carding a 65 in the second round, the record for lowest by an amateur in major's history. He finished tied for 36th, being the lowest amateur of the championship. Taylor won the July 2009 Sahalee Players Championship. In the 2009 Canadian Amateur at Blainvillier Golf Club, he finished tied for 3rd with a final score of −5. He also became the number one world amateur golfer according to the World Amateur Golf Ranking. In September 2009, he won the Mark H. McCormack Medal for being on top of the World Amateur Golf Ranking after the U.S. Amateur.

In his final amateur year in 2010, Taylor finished 41st at the May 2010 NCAA Division I Men's Golf Championship, while his Washington Husky's team finished in fourth place. He was named a Ping First-Team All-American for the second season in a row, along with Washington teammates Chris Williams and Richard H. Lee. Taylor was eliminated from the U.S. Amateur in the first round by Chan Kim. In the 2010 Canadian Amateur, Taylor finished tied for 33rd at +3. He won the 2010 Ben Hogan Award for the top men's collegiate golfer, and also won his second consecutive Pac-10 Golfer of the Year award.

== Professional career ==
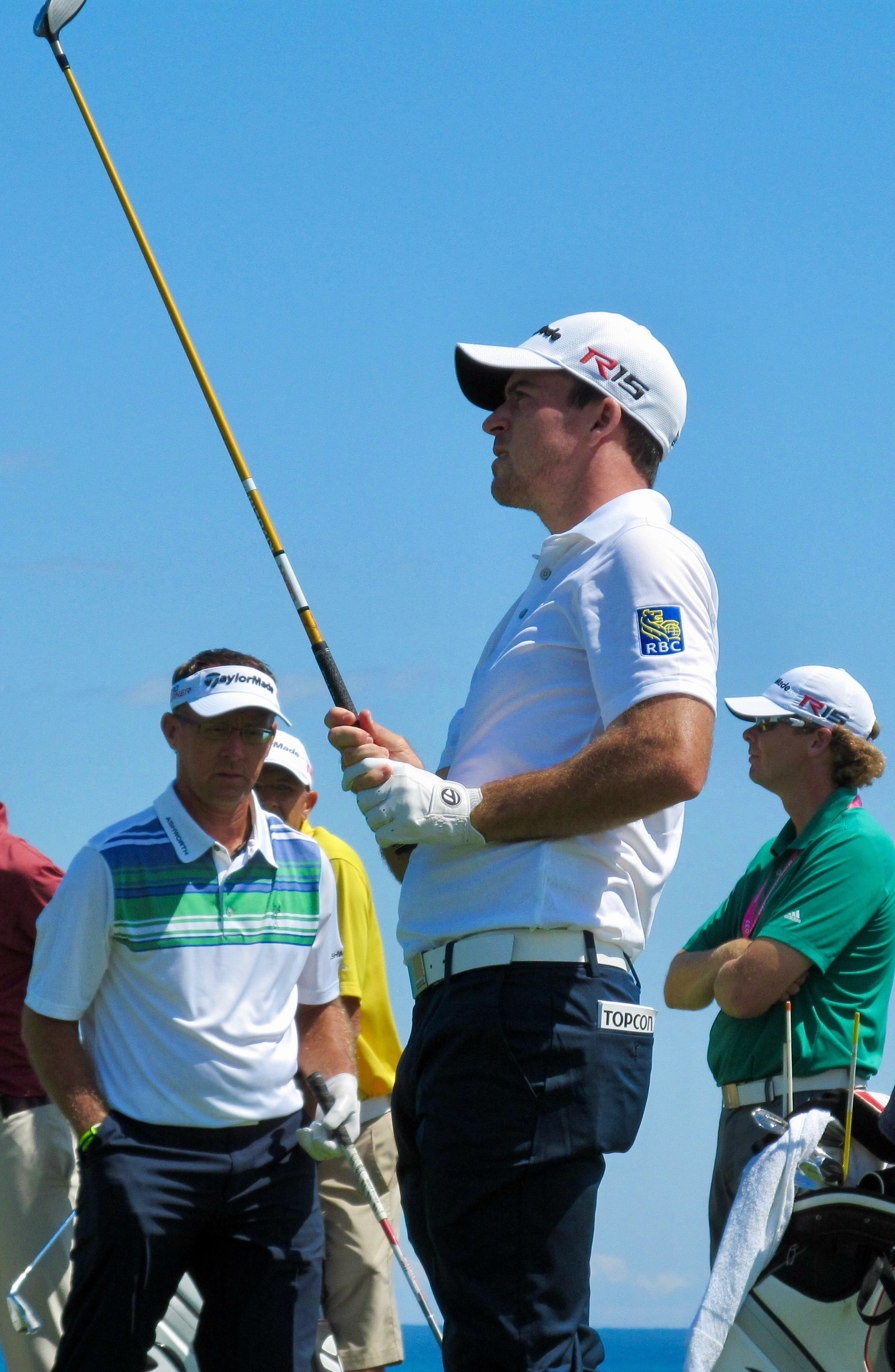
Taylor at the 2015 PGA Championship

Taylor turned professional in late 2010, making his professional debut at the October Russell Brewing VGT Tour Championship on the Vancouver Golf Tour. He played on PGA Tour Canada from 2011 to 2013, compiling 10 top-10 finishes in 25 starts. In 2013, he finished 7th on the Order of Merit and earned an exemption into the final stage of the Web.com Tour qualifying school, where he finished 11th to earn status for the 2014 season. He finished 69th in the 2014 Web.com Tour regular season, then 23rd in the Web.com Tour Finals to earn his PGA Tour card for the 2014–15 season.

=== 2014–15 PGA Tour season: inaugural season and first victory ===
Taylor made his first start in the 2014–15 PGA Tour season at the October Frys.com Open at Silverado Resort and Spa. He finished at +2 and missed the cut. In November 2014, Taylor achieved his first victory on the PGA Tour at the Sanderson Farms Championship, hosted at the Country Club of Jackson, finishing with a score of −16. Taylor's win was the first on the PGA Tour for a Canadian-born player in seven years, following Mike Weir's victory at the 2007 Fry's Electronics Open. Taylor qualified for only one major, competing in the 2015 PGA Championship. He finished with a score of +4 and tied for 68th place. In his inaugural season on the PGA Tour, Taylor competed in 28 events, making 17 cuts, with two top-25 finishes, and one win. At the conclusion of the FedEx Cup race, Taylor finished at 101st place with 613 FedEx Cup points, and finished the season with $1,072,360 in prize money.

=== 2015–16 to 2018–19 PGA Tour seasons: limited success ===
In his second season, the 2015–16 PGA Tour season, Taylor made his best finish at the March Puerto Rico Open, finishing at −10 and in a tie for 5th place, marking his only top-20 finish. Taylor did not qualify of an majors during the year, and was cut from the Players Championship. In the 2015–16 PGA Tour season, Taylor competed in 26 events, making 16 cuts with five top-25 finishes. He finished the FedEx Cup race at 129th with 441 FedEx Cup points, and won $628,756 in prize money.

In the 2016–17 PGA Tour season, Taylor made his first top-10 finish at the AT&T Pebble Beach Pro-Am, finishing −8 and tied for 10th place. Taylor made his second top-10 finish of the season at the Wells Fargo Championship, finishing −6 and tied for eighth, his best finish for the 2016–17 PGA Tour season. His third top-10 finish came only a few weeks later at the AT&T Byron Nelson, finishing at −7 and tied for ninth, and his final top-10 finish came at the Greenbrier Classic, finishing −9 and tied for ninth place. For the second season in a row, Taylor failed to qualify for any major championships. In the 2016–17 PGA Tour season, Taylor competed in 29 events, making 20 cuts with eight top-25 finishes. He finished the FedEx Cup race at 93rd with 554 FedEx Cup points, and won $1,255,259 in prize money.

In the 2017–18 PGA Tour season, Taylor started out hot finishing tied for 9th in the Safeway Open with a final score of −9. He followed that up with a tied 13th at the CIMB Classic, and tied 23rd at the CJ Cup. Taylor struggled in the middle of the season missing six consecutive cuts between March and May 2018. He made one more top-10 finish at the Wyndham Championship with a final score of −15 and tied for 8th place. Taylor failed to qualify for any major championships. In the 2017–18 PGA Tour season, Taylor competed in 30 events, making 17 cuts with six top-25 finishes. He finished the FedEx Cup race at 123rd with 420 FedEx Cup points, and won $899,373 in prize money.

In the 2018–19 PGA Tour season, Taylor finished his fifth tournament of the season, the 2018 World Cup of Golf in Australia, tied for 4th place with a final score of −17. He had only one other top-10 finish on the season, finishing tied for 9th at the Zurich Classic of New Orleans with a final score of −19. Taylor failed to qualify for any major championships. In the 2018–19 PGA Tour season, Taylor competed in 28 events, making 21 cuts with four top-25 finishes. He finished the FedEx Cup race at 102nd place with 408 FedEx Cup points, and won $892,663 in prize money.

=== 2019–20 PGA Tour season: second victory ===
In the 2019–20 PGA Tour season, Taylor finished the Safeway Open at tied for 10th place with a final score of −11. In February 2020, he entered the final round of the AT&T Pebble Beach Pro-Am with a one shot lead over Phil Mickelson. Taylor shot a final round 70 in windy conditions and won the tournament by four strokes over Kevin Streelman with a final score of −19. The win was his first full-strength tournament victory on the PGA Tour, and his second overall. The win qualified him for his first Masters Tournament. A month later, the PGA Tour season was paused due to the COVID-19 pandemic, with the season pausing after the first round of the 2020 Players Championship. Taylor had shot an opening round 73, and was tied for 98th when the tournament was cancelled. In his first tournament after the season pause, Taylor finished tied for 48th at the Workday Charity Open with a final score of −3. In his major championship appearance at the 2020 PGA Championship, his first since 2015, Taylor did not make the cut finishing +9 after two rounds. In the 2019–20 PGA Tour season, Taylor competed in 18 events, making 11 cuts with three top-25 finishes. He finished the FedEx Cup race at 48th place with 741 FedEx Cup points, and won $1,897,539 in prize money.

=== 2020–21 to 2021–22 PGA Tour season: limited success ===
In the 2020–21 PGA Tour season, Taylor competed in his first Masters Tournament, finishing tied for 29th with a final score of −3. He experienced limited success in the season, finishing tied 11th at the Sony Open in Hawaii, tied 20th at the Genesis Invitational, and tied 48th at the 2021 Players Championship. At the Wyndham Championship, the final tournament of the season, Taylor made his only top 10 finish, tied for 10th with a final score of −13. In the 2020–21 PGA Tour season, Taylor competed in 29 events, making 18 cuts with three top 25 finishes. He finished the FedEx Cup race at 141st place with 370 FedEx Cup points, and won $862,159 in prize money.

In the 2021–22 PGA Tour season, Taylor had his best finish at the AT&T Pebble Beach Pro-Am at tied for 14th place with a final score of −11. In the 2021 US Open, Taylor was cut after the second round with a score of +5. In the 2021–22 PGA Tour season, Taylor competed in 28 events, making 16 cuts with four top 25 finishes. He finished the FedEx Cup race at 134th place with 334 FedEx Cup points, and won $832,637 in prize money.

=== 2022–23 PGA Tour season: victory at Canadian Open ===
In the 2022–23 PGA Tour season, Taylor started hot with a tied 6th place finish at the opening Fortinet Championship with a score of −11. He made his second top-10 finish of the season at the Sony Open in Hawaii, finishing tied for 7th with a final score of −13. In February 2023, Taylor finished runner-up at the WM Phoenix Open, two shots behind Scottie Scheffler with a final score of −17. This result also moved him to his highest world ranking at 73rd. Taylor and fellow Canadian teammate Adam Hadwin finished runner up at the April Zurich Classic of New Orleans, with a final score of −28, two strokes behind the team of Nick Hardy and Davis Riley. In the 2023 PGA Championship, Taylor was cut after the second round finishing at +7.

Taylor won his third career tournament at the June RBC Canadian Open, at the Oakdale Golf & Country Club. In the third round, Taylor scored a tournament low 63, and fourth round a 66 to finish for a tie for first with Tommy Fleetwood. In the playoff, both golfers birdied the first, and parred the second and third holes. On the par-5 fourth hole, Taylor holed a 72-foot putt for eagle to win. He became the first Canadian citizen to win their national open since 1954, and the first born in Canada to win it since 1914.

=== 2024 PGA Tour season: victory at the WM Phoenix Open ===
After a slow start to the 2024 PGA Tour season that saw him finish 52nd or worse in three of his first four events, Taylor picked up his fourth career victory at the WM Phoenix Open in a playoff over Charley Hoffman with a birdie on the second playoff hole.

=== 2025 PGA Tour season: Fifth career victory ===
In his second start of the 2025 PGA Tour season at the Sony Open in Hawaii, Taylor won his fifth PGA Tour event in a playoff over Nico Echavarría.

== Amateur wins ==
- 2006 BC Junior, Canadian Junior
- 2007 Canadian Amateur Championship
- 2009 Sahalee Players Championship

== Awards and honors ==
- In 2009, Taylor was awarded the Mark H. McCormack Medal
- In 2010, he was selected for the Ben Hogan Award

== Professional wins (6) ==
=== PGA Tour wins (5) ===
No.	Date	Tournament	Winning score	Margin of victory	Runner(s)-up
1	Nov 9, 2014	Sanderson Farms Championship	−16 (67-69-70-66=272)	2 strokes	(United States) Jason Bohn, (United States) Boo Weekley
2	Feb 9, 2020	AT&T Pebble Beach Pro-Am	−19 (63-66-69-70=268)	4 strokes	(United States) Kevin Streelman
3	Jun 11, 2023	RBC Canadian Open	−17 (75-67-63-66=271)	Playoff	(England) Tommy Fleetwood
4	Feb 11, 2024	WM Phoenix Open	−21 (60-70-68-65=263)	Playoff	(United States) Charley Hoffman
5	Jan 12, 2025	Sony Open in Hawaii	−16 (66-68-65-65=264)	Playoff	(Colombia) Nico Echavarría

PGA Tour playoff record (3–0)

No.	Year	Tournament	Opponent	Result
1	2023	RBC Canadian Open	(England) Tommy Fleetwood	Won with eagle on fourth extra hole
2	2024	WM Phoenix Open	(United States) Charley Hoffman	Won with birdie on second extra hole
3	2025	Sony Open in Hawaii	(Colombia) Nico Echavarría	Won with birdie on second extra hole

=== Gateway Tour wins (1) ===
- 2013 Arizona Fall 3

== Results in major championships ==
Results not in chronological order in 2020.

Tournament	2008	2009	2010	2011	2012	2013	2014	2015	2016	2017	2018
Masters Tournament											
U.S. Open	CUT	T36LA									
The Open Championship											
PGA Championship								T68			

Tournament	2019	2020	2021	2022	2023	2024	2025	2026
Masters Tournament		T29				CUT	T40	T41
PGA Championship		CUT			CUT	CUT	CUT	T26
U.S. Open	T43			CUT	CUT	CUT	T23	CUT
The Open Championship		NT			CUT	CUT	CUT	T59

Did not play

LA = low amateur
CUT = missed the half-way cut
"T" = tied
NT = no tournament due to COVID-19 pandemic

=== Summary ===
Tournament	Wins	2nd	3rd	Top-5	Top-10	Top-25	Events	Cuts made
Masters Tournament	0	0	0	0	0	0	4	3
PGA Championship	0	0	0	0	0	0	6	2
U.S. Open	0	0	0	0	0	1	8	3
The Open Championship	0	0	0	0	0	0	4	1
Totals	0	0	0	0	0	1	22	9

- Most consecutive cuts made – 3 (2009 U.S. Open – 2019 U.S. Open)
- Longest streak of top-10s – 0

== Results in The Players Championship ==
Tournament	2015	2016	2017	2018	2019	2020	2021	2022	2023	2024	2025	2026
The Players Championship	73	CUT		T79	T16	C	T48		CUT	T26	CUT	T42

Did not play

CUT = missed the halfway cut
"T" indicates a tie for a place
C = canceled after the first round due to the COVID-19 pandemic

== Results in World Golf Championships ==
Tournament	2020	2021	2022	2023
Championship				
Match Play	NT^{1}			T31
Invitational	T35			
Champions	NT^{1}	NT^{1}	NT^{1}	

^{1}Cancelled due to COVID-19 pandemic

Did not play

NT = No tournament
"T" = Tied
Note that the Championship and Invitational were discontinued from 2022. The Champions was discontinued from 2023.

== Team appearances ==
Amateur

- Eisenhower Trophy (representing Canada): 2008
- Four Nations Cup (representing Canada): 2009 (winners)

Professional

- World Cup (representing Canada): 2018
- Presidents Cup (representing the International team): 2026

== See also ==
- 2014 Web.com Tour Finals graduates
