= Chris Gotterup =

American professional golfer (born 1999)

Personal information
- Full name: Christopher Gotterup
- Nationality: United States
- Born: July 20, 1999 (age 27) Easton, Maryland, U.S.
- Height: 6 ft 0 in (183 cm)
- Weight: 210 lb (95 kg)

Career
- Sport: Golf
- College: Rutgers University; University of Oklahoma
- Turned professional: 2022
- Current tour: PGA Tour
- Former tour: Korn Ferry Tour
- Professional wins: 6
- Highest ranking: 5 (February 8, 2026) (as of October 25, 2026)

Number of wins by tour
- PGA Tour: 5
- European Tour: 1
- Other: 1

Best results in major championships
- Masters Tournament: T24: 2026
- PGA Championship: T10: 2026
- U.S. Open: T23: 2025
- The Open Championship: 3rd: 2025

Achievements and awards
- Haskins Award: 2022
- Jack Nicklaus Award: 2022

Christopher Gotterup (born July 20, 1999) is an American professional golfer who plays on the PGA Tour, where he has won five times.

== Early life and amateur career ==
Gotterup was born in Easton, Maryland, to Kate and Morten Gotterup. He has a brother named Patrick and a sister named Anna, and was raised in Little Silver, New Jersey. He is of Danish descent through his paternal grandparents, who were born in Denmark. His father speaks Danish, but he does not. As of 2025, Gotterup uses the Danish spelling of his name, Gøtterup, on his Instagram profile.

Gotterup's father was a collegiate tennis player and an accomplished golfer, who won multiple New Jersey State Golf Association tournaments. Gotterup played varsity golf at Christian Brothers Academy in nearby Lincroft and graduated in 2017.

Gotterup stayed in New Jersey and played college golf at Rutgers University from 2017 to 2021. Gotterup became one of the greatest college golfers in the nation and was one of the greatest in Scarlet Knights history. When he graduated, he held school records in scoring average, par 3 scoring, par 4 scoring, par 5 scoring, and number of par or better rounds.

Gotterup received the following accolades in his time at Rutgers:

- 2019–20 Big Ten Player of the Year
- 2020 First Team All-Big Ten
- 2019–20 Big Ten Les Bolstad Award (lowest conference stroke average)
- 2020 NCAA Division I PING All-American (Third Team)
- 2020 GolfWeek All-American (Honorable Mention)

In 2019, he won the Metropolitan Amateur and New Jersey State Open, and was given the Metropolitan Golf Association Jerry Courville Sr. Player of the Year Award. Gotterup transferred to the University of Oklahoma for 2021–22, where he won the Haskins Award and Jack Nicklaus Award as the top college golfer.

== Professional career ==
Gotterup turned professional in 2022 after the NCAA championship. He played events on both the PGA Tour and Korn Ferry Tour in 2022 including a T-4 finish at the John Deere Classic. He finished T-3 at the Korn Ferry Tour Q-School to earn his 2023 Korn Ferry Tour card. He had three top-10 finishes on the tour in 2023 and earned his 2024 PGA Tour card by finishing 23rd on the Korn Ferry Tour points list.

On May 12, 2024, he won the Myrtle Beach Classic for his first PGA Tour victory.

In July 2025, Gotterup won the Genesis Scottish Open by two shots over Rory McIlroy and Marco Penge. It was his first win in a DP World Tour event and second PGA Tour victory. He followed that up the next week with a solo 3rd finish at the 2025 Open Championship.

In January 2026, Gotterup won the season opening Sony Open in Hawaii by two strokes over Ryan Gerard. Three weeks later, he won the WM Phoenix Open in a sudden-death playoff over Hideki Matsuyama. He jumped to 5th in the Official World Golf Ranking, his best position. In July 2026, Gotterup rallied from a five-shot deficit in the final round by closing with a 9-under 62 to win the John Deere Classic. In September 2026, Gotterup made his Presidents Cup debut as a member of the United States team and won his singles match against Christiaan Bezuidenhout.

== Amateur wins ==
- 2019 Metropolitan Amateur, Fighting Irish Classic
- 2022 Puerto Rico Invitational

== Professional wins (6) ==
=== PGA Tour wins (5) ===
No.	Date	Tournament	Winning score	To par	Margin of victory	Runner(s)-up
1	May 12, 2024	Myrtle Beach Classic	66-64-65-67=262	−22	6 strokes	(United States) Alistair Docherty, (United States) Davis Thompson
2	Jul 13, 2025	Genesis Scottish Open^{1}	68-61-70-66=265	−15	2 strokes	(Northern Ireland) Rory McIlroy, (England) Marco Penge
3	Jan 18, 2026	Sony Open in Hawaii	63-69-68-64=264	−16	2 strokes	(United States) Ryan Gerard
4	Feb 8, 2026	WM Phoenix Open	63-71-70-64=268	−16	Playoff	(Japan) Hideki Matsuyama
5	Jul 5, 2026	John Deere Classic	66-68-68-62=264	−20	1 stroke	(United States) Max Homa

^{1}Co-sanctioned by the European Tour

PGA Tour playoff record (1–0)

No.	Year	Tournament	Opponent	Result
1	2026	WM Phoenix Open	(Japan) Hideki Matsuyama	Won with birdie on first extra hole

=== Other wins (1) ===
- 2019 New Jersey State Open (as an amateur)

== Results in major championships ==
Tournament	2022	2023	2024	2025	2026
Masters Tournament					T24
PGA Championship			CUT		T10
U.S. Open	T43			T23	T43
The Open Championship				3	T18

Top 10
Did not play

CUT = missed the half-way cut
"T" = tied

=== Summary ===
Tournament	Wins	2nd	3rd	Top-5	Top-10	Top-25	Events	Cuts made
Masters Tournament	0	0	0	0	0	1	1	1
PGA Championship	0	0	0	0	1	1	2	1
U.S. Open	0	0	0	0	0	1	3	3
The Open Championship	0	0	1	1	1	2	2	2
Totals	0	0	1	1	2	5	8	7

- Most consecutive cuts made – 6 (2025 U.S. Open – 2026 Open Championship, current)
- Longest streak of top-10s – 1 (twice)

== Results in The Players Championship ==
Tournament	2025	2026
The Players Championship	CUT	T56

CUT = missed the half-way cut
"T" = tied

== U.S. national team appearances ==
Professional

- Presidents Cup: 2026 (winners)

== See also ==
- 2023 Korn Ferry Tour graduates
