= 2026 NCAA Division I men's golf championship =

NCAA men's golf championship tournament

2026 NCAA Division I Men's Golf Championship

Tournament information
- Dates: May 29 – June 3, 2026
- Location: Carlsbad, California, U.S.
- Courses: Omni La Costa Resort & Spa (University of Texas)
- Organized by: NCAA

Statistics
- Field: 30 teams, 156 individuals

Champion
- Team: Auburn; Individual: Preston Stout, Oklahoma State
- Team: 4–1 vs UCLA; Individual: 274 (−14)

The 2026 NCAA Division I Men's Golf Championships was contested May 29 – June 3 at Omni La Costa Resort & Spa in Carlsbad, California. It was the 87th annual tournament to establish the national champions of the 2026 season in NCAA Division I men's collegiate golf. The tournament is hosted by the University of Texas. There was both team and individual championships.

It is the third year in which the men's and women's Division I golf tournaments are played at the same location; the women's championship will be held in Carlsbad before the men's championship, from May 22–27.

Preston Stout of Oklahoma State won the individual tournament by one stroke over William Jennings of Alabama.

== Regional qualifying tournaments ==
- There are six regional sites that held the qualifying tournaments across the United States from May 18–20, 2026.
- The five lowest-scoring teams from each of the regional sites qualified to compete at the national championships as team and individual players.
- An additional individual with the lowest score in their regional, whose teams did not qualify, qualified to compete for the individual title in the national championship.

Regional name	Golf course	Location	Qualified teams^	Additionally qualified
Athens	University of Georgia Golf Course	Athens, Georgia	1. Vanderbilt; 2. Louisville; 3. Auburn; 4. BYU; 5. Georgia	Malan Potgieter, Louisiana
Bermuda Run	Bermuda Run Country Club	Bermuda Run, North Carolina	T1. Pepperdine; T1. Virginia; 3. Ole Miss; 4. Southern California; 5. Mississippi State	Jacob Lang, Kentucky
Bryan	Traditions Club	Bryan, Texas	1. Texas; 2. Texas A&M; 3. Chattanooga; 4. North Carolina; 5. Tennessee	Jorge Martin Sampedro, UTRGV
Columbus	Ohio State University Golf Club	Columbus, Ohio	1. Florida; 2. Stanford; 3. Memphis; 4. Arizona State; 5. Florida State	Steen Zeman, Long Beach State
Corvallis	Trysting Tree Golf Club	Corvallis, Oregon	1. Oklahoma; 2. UCLA; 3. Arkansas; 4. Purdue; 5. San Diego	Michael Lugiano, Liberty
Marana	The Gallery Golf Club	Marana, Arizona	1. Arizona; 2. Oklahoma State; 3. LSU; T4. Arkansas State; T4. Duke	William Jennings, Alabama

^ Teams listed in qualifying order.

== Venue ==
This is the third time the NCAA Division I Men's Golf Championship will be held at Omni La Costa Resort & Spa and hosted by the University of Texas.

== Team competition ==
=== Leaderboard ===
- Par, single-round: 288
- Par, total: 1,152
- After 54 holes, the field of 30 teams was cut to the top 15.

Place	Team	Round 1	Round 2	Round 3	Round 4	Total	To par
1	Auburn	284	272	286	284	1126	−25
2	Texas	287	277	281	284	1129	−23
3	Vanderbilt	287	277	291	285	1140	−12
T4	Florida	291	290	284	276	1141	−11
T4	Oklahoma State	295	274	287	285	1141	−11
6	Arizona	287	285	284	293	1149	−3
T7	UCLA	280	289	287	294	1150	−2
T7	Stanford	291	286	289	284	1150	−2
T7	Tennessee	292	287	287	284	1150	–2
T7	North Carolina	287	288	283	292	1150	–2
11	Virginia	288	284	293	288	1153	+1
12	LSU	303	293	270	289	1155	+3
13	Duke	286	286	291	293	1156	+4
14	Oklahoma	292	284	288	293	1157	+5
15	San Diego	286	291	289	310	1176	+24

Stanford and UCLA advanced via a playoff over North Carolina and Tennessee.

Remaining teams: Pepperdine (868), Mississippi State (871), BYU (873), Arkansas (874), Georgia (876), Arizona State (877), Arkansas State (879), Purdue (880), Louisville (881), Texas A&M (882), Chattanooga (884), Ole Miss (884), Memphis (887), Southern California (890), Florida State (899)

=== Match-play bracket ===
- The following eight teams had the lowest stroke play total and advanced into the match-play event.

Quarterfinals; June 2, morning
1	Auburn	3.5
8	Stanford	1.5
4	Florida	2
5	Oklahoma State	3
3	Vanderbilt	2
6	Arizona	3
2	Texas	2
7	UCLA	3

Semifinals; June 2, afternoon
1	Auburn	5
5	Oklahoma State	0
6	Arizona	1.5
7	UCLA	3.5

Final; June 3
1	Auburn	4
7	UCLA	1

== Individual competition ==
June 1, 2026 (Par:72, Total: 288)

The remaining 86 players from the top 15 teams and the top 9 individuals outside of those teams competed for the individual championship title after the 54-hole cut.

Place	Player	University	Score	To par
1	Preston Stout	Oklahoma State	274	−14
2	William Jennings	Alabama	275	−13
3	Josiah Gilbert	Auburn	277	−11
T4	Will Hartman	Vanderbilt	278	−10
T4	Filip Jakubčík	Arizona	278	−10
T6	Dean Greyserman	Stanford	279	−9
T6	Baylor Larrabee	UCLA	279	−9
T8	Kihei Akina	BYU	280	−8
T8	Lance Simpson	Tennessee	280	−8
T10	Ethan Evans	Duke	281	−7
T10	Jackson Koivun	Auburn	281	−7
T10	Tommy Morrison	Texas	281	−7
T10	Willy Walsh	Pepperdine	281	−7
