= Ethan Fang =

American amateur golfer (born c. 2006)

- Fang in 2026

Personal information
- Nationality: United States
- Born: c.2006 Plano, Texas, U.S.
- Height: 6 ft 0 in (183 cm)
- Weight: 145 lb (66 kg)

Career
- Sport: Golf
- College: University of California, Berkeley; Oklahoma State University
- Status: Amateur

Best results in major championships
- Masters Tournament: CUT: 2026
- PGA Championship: DNP
- U.S. Open: CUT: 2026
- The Open Championship: CUT: 2025

Ethan Fang (born c. 2006) is an American amateur golfer.

Fang was born in Plano, Texas. He attended the University of California, Berkeley for one year (2023–24) then transferred to the Oklahoma State University.

Fang won The Amateur Championship in 2025, earning him entry into the 2025 Open Championship, 2026 Masters Tournament, and 2026 U.S. Open. He missed the cut at the Open Championship.

== Amateur wins ==
- 2025 The Amateur Championship, The Carmel Cup
- 2026 Maridoe Collegiate

== Results in major championships ==
Tournament	2025	2026
Masters Tournament		CUT
PGA Championship		
U.S. Open		CUT
The Open Championship	CUT	

Did not play

CUT = missed the half-way cut

== U.S. national team appearances ==
- Arnold Palmer Cup: 2025
- Walker Cup: 2025 (winners), 2026
- Eisenhower Trophy: 2025
