= Preston Stout =

American amateur golfer (born 2004)

Personal information
- Nationality: United States
- Born: July 4, 2004 (age 22) Richardson, Texas, U.S.
- Height: 6 ft 1 in (185 cm)

Career
- Sport: Golf
- College: Oklahoma State University
- Status: Amateur

Best results in major championships
- Masters Tournament: DNP
- PGA Championship: DNP
- U.S. Open: CUT: 2026
- The Open Championship: DNP

Achievements and awards
- Mark H. McCormack Medal: 2026
- Big 12 Conference Player of the Year: 2026

Preston Stout (born July 4, 2004) is an American amateur golfer and member of the Oklahoma State Cowboys golf team. In 2026, he won the NCAA Championship and rose to number one in the World Amateur Golf Ranking.

== Amateur career ==
Stout won the Byron Nelson Junior Championship in 2021, 2022 and 2023, joining Jordan Spieth as the only other player to win the event three times. In 2023 he posted scores of 67, 65 and 67.

In 2022, Stout finished fourth at the Junior PGA Championship and competed at the Junior Presidents Cup. He advanced to the quarterfinals at the U.S. Junior Amateur. In 2025, he matched the course record with a 61 on his way to win the Northeast Amateur by eight shots.

Stout claimed medalist honors at the 2025 U.S. Amateur, posting rounds of 67 and 65 for an 8-under total of 132 and a two-shot victory. At the Walker Cup, he provided the match's deciding point with a 2-and-1 victory over Luke Poulter in 2025, and was selected again in 2026.

== College career ==
Stout enrolled at Oklahoma State University in 2023 and joined the Oklahoma State Cowboys golf team. As a junior, he was named Big 12 Conference Player of the Year after he finished the season with five wins, the most by a junior in program history, and became the 10th Cowboy to win the NCAA Championship individual title. He became the second Cowboy, after Peter Uihlein, to earn the Mark H. McCormack Medal as the top-ranked player in the World Amateur Golf Ranking for 2026.

Stout made his major debut in the 2026 U.S. Open at Shinnecock Hills, and made his first PGA Tour cut at the 2026 John Deere Classic, where he tied for 15th.

== Amateur wins ==
- 2021 AJGA Carolina Trace Junior, Byron Nelson Junior Championship
- 2022 Byron Nelson Junior Championship, C.T. Pan Junior Championship
- 2023 Byron Nelson Junior Championship
- 2024 Big 12 Conference Championship
- 2025 Big 12 Conference Championship, Northeast Amateur
- 2026 Cabo Collegiate, Maridoe Collegiate, Mountaineer Invitational, Big 12 Conference Championship, NCAA Championship

== Results in major championships ==
Tournament	2026
Masters Tournament	
PGA Championship	
U.S. Open	CUT
The Open Championship	

Did not play

CUT = missed the half-way cut

== U.S. national team appearances ==
- Junior Presidents Cup: 2022 (winners)
- Arnold Palmer Cup: 2025
- Walker Cup: 2025 (winners), 2026
- Eisenhower Trophy: 2025
