= Maverick McNealy =

American professional golfer (born 1995)

Personal information
- Full name: Maverick Scott McNealy
- Nationality: United States
- Born: November 7, 1995 (age 30) Portola Valley, California, U.S.
- Height: 6 ft 1 in (185 cm)
- Weight: 170 lb (77 kg)
- Spouse: Maya Daniels (m. 2023)

Career
- Sport: Golf
- College: Stanford University
- Turned professional: 2017
- Current tour: PGA Tour
- Former tour: Korn Ferry Tour
- Professional wins: 1
- Highest ranking: 10 (April 6, 2025) (as of October 25, 2026)

Number of wins by tour
- PGA Tour: 1

Best results in major championships
- Masters Tournament: T18: 2026
- PGA Championship: T18: 2026
- U.S. Open: T32: 2026
- The Open Championship: T23: 2025

Achievements and awards
- Haskins Award: 2015
- Mark H. McCormack Medal: 2016
- Ben Hogan Award: 2017

Maverick Scott McNealy (born November 7, 1995) is an American professional golfer who plays on the PGA Tour. He reached number one in the World Amateur Golf Ranking in 2015. McNealy turned professional in 2017 and won his first tournament on the PGA Tour in 2024.

== Early life and amateur career ==
McNealy was born in Stanford, California, on November 7, 1995, to Susan and Scott McNealy. In 1982, Scott co-founded Sun Microsystems, a technology company which was acquired by Oracle Corporation for $7.4 billion in 2010.

McNealy was one of four children, all boys. Scott McNealy, who played collegiate golf at Harvard University, introduced his sons to golf at a young age. Scott stated in 2014: "I told the boys, never mind a silver spoon; you’ve got a platinum spoon in your mouth. Everybody’s going to think it was given to you. So you have to outwork and outclass everyone on the planet or they’re just going to think you’re a child of privilege." Alongside golf, McNealy competed in basketball, soccer, and hockey during his youth. He was part of two California state hockey championships with the San Jose Junior Sharks.

McNealy qualified for the 2014 U.S. Open at Pinehurst at the age of 18. During the 2014−15 golf season, McNealy shot a 61 in the final round of the Pac-12 Conference Championship tournament, tying the 18-hole Stanford record held by Tiger Woods and Cameron Wilson. In 2015, he won the Haskins Award, which is presented annually to the best collegiate male golfer in the United States, becoming the third Stanford University golfer to win the award since 1971 (the other two being Woods and Patrick Rodgers).

Despite being America's most highly rated professional golf prospect in 2016, McNealy considered passing on professional golf for a career in business. In August 2017, McNealy confirmed that he would turn professional after the 2017 Walker Cup. His professional debut was at the Safeway Open.

== Professional career ==
McNealy played on the Web.com Tour in 2018. He played in 18 tournaments, making the cut in 12. His best finish was a tie for third at the United Leasing & Finance Championship. McNealy earned a total of $84,261 and finished 65th on the money list for 2018. He did not earn a PGA Tour card for the 2018–19 season but he did earn full status on the Web.com Tour for the 2019 season.

McNealy earned his PGA Tour card for the 2019–20 season, via his finish on the 2019 Korn Ferry Tour.

In November 2024, McNealy won the RSM Classic for his first PGA Tour victory in his 134th start. McNealy birdied the final hole to win by one.

McNealy reached a career high Official World Golf Ranking of 10 in April 2025. That year, he was one of sixteen players to make the cut in all four majors.

== Personal life ==
McNealy met his wife Maya Daniels, a kinesiologist, at a physical therapy clinic in Las Vegas. They married in 2023 and had their first child in 2025.

As of 2023, McNealy is a licensed pilot, flying himself in a Cirrus SR22 single-engine propeller plane to compete in the 2025 Genesis Invitational golf tournament held in Pacific Palisades, California. His brother, Scout, was his caddie for the 2025 PGA Tour season.

== Professional wins (1) ==
=== PGA Tour wins (1) ===
No.	Date	Tournament	Winning score	Margin of victory	Runners-up
1	Nov 24, 2024	RSM Classic	−16 (62-70-66-68=266)	1 stroke	(United States) Daniel Berger, (United States) Luke Clanton (a), (Colombia) Nico Echavarría

== Amateur wins ==
- 2014 OFCC Fighting Illini Invite, SW Invite
- 2015 The Prestige at PGA West, The Goodwin, Pac-12 Championships, NCAA Chapel Hill Regional, Northern California Amateur Match Play, OFCC Fighting Illini Invite, U.S. Collegiate Championship, Gifford Collegiate-CordeValle
- 2016 Western Intercollegiate, Nike Collegiate Invite

== Results in major championships ==
Results not in chronological order in 2020.

Tournament	2014	2015	2016	2017	2018
Masters Tournament					
U.S. Open	CUT			CUT	
The Open Championship				CUT	
PGA Championship					

Tournament	2019	2020	2021	2022	2023	2024	2025	2026
Masters Tournament							T32	T18
PGA Championship			CUT	T75	CUT	T23	T33	T18
U.S. Open							37	T32
The Open Championship		NT				CUT	T23	CUT

Did not play

CUT = missed the half-way cut
"T" = tied
NT = no tournament due to COVID-19 pandemic

=== Summary ===
Tournament	Wins	2nd	3rd	Top-5	Top-10	Top-25	Events	Cuts made
Masters Tournament	0	0	0	0	0	1	2	2
PGA Championship	0	0	0	0	0	2	6	4
U.S. Open	0	0	0	0	0	0	4	2
The Open Championship	0	0	0	0	0	1	4	1
Totals	0	0	0	0	0	4	16	9

- Most consecutive cuts made – 7 (2025 Masters – 2026 U.S. Open)

== Results in The Players Championship ==
Tournament	2021	2022	2023	2024	2025	2026
The Players Championship	CUT	T46	T60	T9	CUT	T32

Top 10

CUT = missed the halfway cut
"T" indicates a tie for a place

== Results in World Golf Championships ==
Tournament	2022	2023
Match Play	17	T52
Champions	NT^{1}	

^{1}Canceled due to the COVID-19 pandemic
"T" = Tied
NT = No tournament
Note that the Champions was discontinued from 2023.

== U.S. national team appearances ==
Amateur

- Arnold Palmer Cup: 2015 (winners), 2017 (winners)
- Walker Cup: 2015, 2017 (winners)
- Eisenhower Trophy: 2016

== See also ==
- 2019 Korn Ferry Tour Finals graduates
