= Dean Robertson =

Scottish professional golfer

Personal information
- Nationality: Scotland
- Born: 11 July 1970 (age 56) Sarnia, Ontario, Canada
- Height: 5 ft 8 in (1.73 m)

Career
- Sport: Golf
- College: Midland College
- Turned professional: 1993
- Former tour: European Tour
- Professional wins: 2

Number of wins by tour
- European Tour: 1
- Other: 1

Best results in major championships
- Masters Tournament: DNP
- PGA Championship: DNP
- U.S. Open: DNP
- The Open Championship: T26: 2000

Dean Robertson (born 11 July 1970) is a Scottish professional golfer.

== Early life and amateur career ==
Robertson was born in Sarnia, Ontario, Canada. He attended Midland College in Texas, United States on a golf scholarship.

Robertson won several amateur titles in Scotland and represented Great Britain and Ireland in the Walker Cup.

== Professional career ==
In 1993, Robertson turned professional. He gained his European Tour card at his second visit to the qualifying school in 1994. He finished in the top hundred on the European Tour Order of Merit every season from 1995 to 2001, before he began to suffer from clinical depression. He came back in 2004 on a medical exemption, and regained his European Tour card for the following season at qualifying school. However, he was unable to recapture the form from earlier in his career, and last played on the European Tour in 2007.

Robertson's sole European Tour victory came at the 1999 Italian Open. That year he achieved his best year-end ranking on the Order of Merit when he finished in 25th place. Since leaving the tour, he has forged a successful career as a coach. Robertson is currently a high performance golf coach at the University of Stirling.

== Amateur wins ==
- 1991 Scottish Youths Amateur Open Championship
- 1992 Scottish Amateur Stroke Play Championship
- 1993 Scottish Amateur Championship

== Professional wins (2) ==
=== European Tour wins (1) ===
No.	Date	Tournament	Winning score	Margin of victory	Runner-up
1	2 May 1999	Fiat and Fila Italian Open	−17 (70-65-68-68=271)	1 stroke	(Republic of Ireland) Pádraig Harrington

=== Other wins (1) ===
- 2006 Scottish PGA Championship

== Results in major championships ==
Tournament	1995	1996	1997	1998	1999	2000
The Open Championship	T79		CUT		T49	T26

Note: Robertson only played in The Open Championship.

Did not play

CUT = missed the half-way cut
"T" = tied

== Team appearances ==
Amateur

- Eisenhower Trophy (representing Great Britain & Ireland): 1992
- St Andrews Trophy (representing Great Britain & Ireland): 1992 (winners), 2024 (non-playing captain)
- Walker Cup (representing Great Britain & Ireland): 1993
- European Amateur Team Championship (representing Scotland): 1993

Professional

- World Cup (representing Scotland): 1999, 2001
