= 2017 Walker Cup =

Golf tournament

Coordinates: 34.069°N 118.423°W

46th Walker Cup Match
- Dates: September 9–10, 2017
- Venue: Los Angeles Country Club (North course)
- Location: Los Angeles, California
- Captains: Spider Miller (USA); Andy Ingram (GB&I)
(United States)	19	7	(United Kingdom) (Republic of Ireland)
- United States wins the Walker Cup

The 46th Walker Cup Match was played September 9 and 10, 2017 at the Los Angeles Country Club in Los Angeles, California. It was the second Walker Cup Match played in California, the previous occasion being in 1981 at Cypress Point Club. Great Britain and Ireland were the holders of the cup. The United States won the match 19 points to 7.

== Format ==
On Saturday, there were four matches of foursomes in the morning and eight singles matches in the afternoon. On Sunday, there were again four matches of foursomes in the morning, followed by ten singles matches (involving every player) in the afternoon. In all, 26 matches were played.

Each of the 26 matches was worth one point in the larger team competition. If a match is all square after the 18th hole extra holes are not played. Rather, each side earns ½ a point toward their team total. The team that accumulates at least 13½ points wins the competition. In the event of a tie, the previous winner retains the Cup.

== Teams ==
Ten players for the USA and Great Britain & Ireland played in the event plus a non-playing captain for each team. Harry Ellis was an automatic selection for the Great Britain & Ireland team having won the 2017 Amateur Championship. The two teams were announced following the U.S. Amateur.

Team USA
Name	Rank	Age	Hometown	Notes
Spider Miller		67	North Vernon, Indiana	non-playing captain
Cameron Champ	11	22	Sacramento, California	won 2017 Trans-Mississippi Amateur
Doug Ghim	4	21	Arlington Heights, Illinois	runner-up 2017 U.S. Amateur
Stewart Hagestad	38	26	Newport Beach, California	won 2016 U.S. Mid-Amateur, low amateur 2017 Masters Tournament
Maverick McNealy	2	21	Portola Valley, California	played 2015 Walker Cup
Collin Morikawa	5	20	La Cañada Flintridge, California	won 2015 Trans-Mississippi Amateur, 2017 Northeast Amateur
Doc Redman	28	19	Raleigh, North Carolina	won 2017 U.S. Amateur
Scottie Scheffler	42	21	Dallas, Texas	low amateur 2017 U.S. Open
Braden Thornberry	3	20	Olive Branch, Mississippi	won 2017 NCAA Individual Championship
Norman Xiong	10	18	Canyon Lake, California	won 2017 Western Amateur
Will Zalatoris	12	21	Plano, Texas	won 2016 Trans-Mississippi Amateur, 2016 Pacific Coast Amateur

& Team Great Britain & Ireland
Name	Rank	Age	Hometown	Notes
(Wales) Andy Ingram		57		non-playing captain
(Wales) David Boote	40	23	Kingswood, Surrey, England	played in 2016 Arnold Palmer Cup
(Wales) Jack Davidson	48	20	Newport, Wales	won 2017 Welsh Amateur Championship
(England) Harry Ellis	80	21	Southampton, England	won 2017 Amateur Championship
(England) Scott Gregory	7	22	Waterlooville, England	won 2016 Amateur Championship
(England) Matthew Jordan	30	21	Hoylake, England	won 2017 St Andrews Links Trophy
(Republic of Ireland) Paul McBride	53	21	Dublin, Ireland	semi-final 2016 Amateur Championship, quarter-final 2017 Amateur Championship
(Scotland) Robert MacIntyre	14	21	Oban, Scotland	runner-up 2016 Amateur Championship
(England) Alfie Plant	36	25	Bexleyheath, England	won 2017 European Amateur, low amateur 2017 Open Championship
(England) Jack Singh Brar	64	20	Romsey, England	won 2017 Lytham Trophy
(Scotland) Connor Syme	8	22	Drumoig, Scotland	won 2016 Australian Amateur

Note: "Rank" is the World Amateur Golf Ranking as of the start of the Cup.

Craig Watson was the original captain of the Great Britain and Ireland team but withdrew on August 30 because of a family illness.

== Saturday's matches ==
=== Morning foursomes ===
&	Results
Ellis/Plant	(United States) 8 & 7	Morikawa/Xiong
Syme/McBride	(United Kingdom) (Republic of Ireland) 3 & 2	Redman/Zalatoris
Gregory/Singh Brar	(United Kingdom) (Republic of Ireland) 3 & 2	Scheffler/Champ
Boote/Davidson	(United States) 5 & 4	McNealy/Ghim
2	Foursomes	2
2	Overall	2

=== Afternoon singles ===
&	Results
Harry Ellis	(United States) 2 up	Braden Thornberry
Connor Syme	(United States) 2 & 1	Norman Xiong
Jack Singh Brar	(United Kingdom) (Republic of Ireland) 3 & 2	Stewart Hagestad
Paul McBride	(United States) 3 & 2	Collin Morikawa
Matthew Jordan	(United States) 2 up	Will Zalatoris
Robert MacIntyre	(United Kingdom) (Republic of Ireland) 6 & 4	Cameron Champ
David Boote	(United States) 2 & 1	Doug Ghim
Scott Gregory	(United States) 3 & 1	Maverick McNealy
2	Singles	6
4	Overall	8

== Sunday's matches ==
=== Morning foursomes ===
&	Results
Syme/McBride	(United States) 2 up	Xiong/Morikawa
Singh Brar/Gregory	(United Kingdom) (Republic of Ireland) 2 up	Thornberry/Redman
Boote/Davidson	(United States) 6 & 5	Zalatoris/Champ
Jordan/MacIntyre	(United States) 3 & 2	Ghim/McNealy
1	Foursomes	3
5	Overall	11

=== Afternoon singles ===
&	Results
Jack Singh Brar	(United States) 2 & 1	Stewart Hagestad
Scott Gregory	halved	Norman Xiong
Connor Syme	(United States) 1 up	Scottie Scheffler
Harry Ellis	(United States) 2 & 1	Collin Morikawa
Paul McBride	(United States) 6 & 5	Braden Thornberry
Matthew Jordan	(United States) 3 & 1	Doug Ghim
Robert MacIntyre	halved	Cameron Champ
Jack Davidson	(United States) 3 & 2	Will Zalatoris
David Boote	(United Kingdom) (Republic of Ireland) 1 up	Doc Redman
Alfie Plant	(United States) 4 & 2	Maverick McNealy
2	Singles	8
7	Overall	19
