= 2026 Open Championship =

Golf tournament

154th Open Championship

Tournament information
- Dates: 16–19 July 2026
- Location: Southport, Merseyside, England; 53.622°N 3.033°W
- Course: Royal Birkdale Golf Club
- Organized by: The R&A
- Tours: DP World Tour; PGA Tour; Japan Golf Tour

Statistics
- Par: 70
- Length: 7,223 yards (6,605 m)
- Field: 156 players, 78 after cut
- Cut: 141 (+1)
- Prize fund: US$17,750,000
- Winner's share: $3,200,000

Champion
- (New Zealand) Ryan Fox
- 270 (−10)
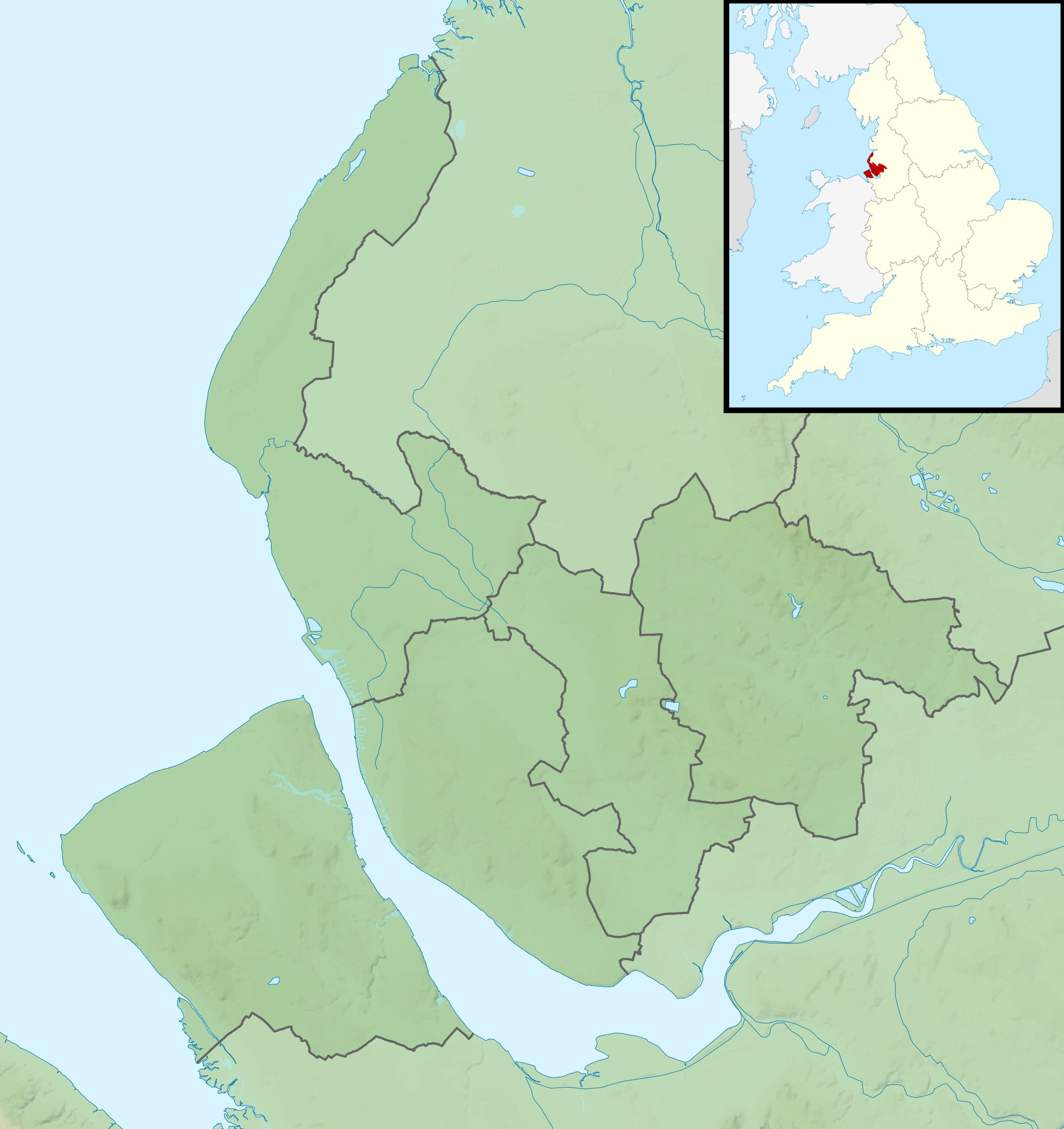
- Location in the United Kingdom Location in England Location in Merseyside

The 2026 Open Championship, officially the 154th Open Championship, was a golf tournament played from 16–19 July 2026 at Royal Birkdale Golf Club. It was the 11th Open held at the club.

Ryan Fox became the third New Zealander to win a golf major, winning by one stroke over Cameron Young.

== Course changes ==
Since the 2017 Open Championship, the course has undergone a renovation. The principal change has come on the back nine; the former par-3 14th was removed, the par-5 15th relocated and became the 14th hole, and a new 15th hole—a par-3—inserted.

== Field ==
The Open Championship field is made up of 156 players, who gained entry through various exemption criteria and qualifying tournaments. The criteria include past Open champions, recent major winners, top ranked players in the world rankings and from the leading world tours, and winners and high finishers from various designated tournaments, including the Open Qualifying Series; the winners of designated amateur events, including The Amateur Championship and U.S. Amateur, also gained exemption provided they remain an amateur. Anyone not qualifying via exemption, and with a handicap of 0.4 or lower, can gain entry through regional and final qualifying events.

=== Criteria and exemptions ===
Each player is classified according to the first category in which he qualified, but other categories are shown in parentheses. (Note: (a) – denotes amateur.)

1. The Open Champions aged 60 or under on 19 July 2026 (for all champions before 2024)

- Stewart Cink
- Darren Clarke
- David Duval
- Brian Harman (3,4,12)
- Pádraig Harrington (17)
- Shane Lowry (3,5,12)
- Rory McIlroy (4,5,6,9,12,13)
- Francesco Molinari (3)
- Collin Morikawa (3,5,12)
- Cameron Smith (3)
- Jordan Spieth (3,5)
- Henrik Stenson (3)
- Ben Curtis, John Daly, Ernie Els, Todd Hamilton, Zach Johnson (3), Paul Lawrie, Justin Leonard, Phil Mickelson, and Tiger Woods did not enter.
- Louis Oosthuizen did not play.

2. The Open Champions aged 55 or under on 19 July 2026 (for all champions from 2024)

- Xander Schauffele (3,4,5,10)
- Scottie Scheffler (3,4,5,9,10,12,13)

3. The Open Champions for 2015–2025 (Note: All will be aged 55 or under on 19 July 2026.)

4. Top 10 finishers and ties in the 2025 Open Championship

- Wyndham Clark (5,11)
- Corey Conners (12)
- Bryson DeChambeau (5,11)
- Harris English (5,12)
- Matt Fitzpatrick (5,6,11)
- Chris Gotterup (5,12)
- Russell Henley (5,12)
- Li Haotong (6)
- Robert MacIntyre (5,6,12)

5. Top 50 players in the Official World Golf Ranking (OWGR) for Week 21, 2026

- Ludvig Åberg (12)
- Daniel Berger (Note: Qualified via the Open Qualifying Series before becoming exempt.)
- Akshay Bhatia (12)
- Keegan Bradley (12)
- Jacob Bridgeman (12)
- Sam Burns (12)
- Patrick Cantlay (12)
- Jason Day
- Tommy Fleetwood (6,12)
- Rickie Fowler
- Ryan Gerard
- Ben Griffin (12)
- Tyrrell Hatton (6)
- Nicolai Højgaard (6)
- Viktor Hovland (12)
- Michael Kim
- Kim Si-woo
- Kurt Kitayama
- Jake Knapp
- Min Woo Lee
- Hideki Matsuyama (12)
- Matt McCarty
- Maverick McNealy (12)
- Alex Norén (6,7)
- Marco Penge (6)
- Jon Rahm (9)
- Aaron Rai (6,10)
- Patrick Reed
- Kristoffer Reitan (6)
- Justin Rose (6,12)
- Adam Scott
- Alex Smalley
- J. J. Spaun (11,12)
- Sepp Straka (12)
- Justin Thomas (10,12)
- Gary Woodland
- Cameron Young (12,13)

6. Top 25 in the final 2025 Race to Dubai rankings

- Ángel Ayora
- Dan Brown
- Laurie Canter
- Martin Couvra
- Daniel Hillier
- Rasmus Højgaard
- Joakim Lagergren
- Keita Nakajima
- Rasmus Neergaard-Petersen
- John Parry
- Adrien Saddier
- Jordan Smith
- Elvis Smylie will not play.

7. Recent winners of the BMW PGA Championship (2023–2025)

- Ryan Fox
- Billy Horschel

8. Top five players, not already exempt, within the top 20 of the 2026 Race to Dubai Rankings through the BMW International Open

- Dan Bradbury
- Hennie du Plessis
- Jayden Schaper
- Andy Sullivan
- Bernd Wiesberger

9. Recent winners of the Masters Tournament (2022–2026)

10. Recent winners of the PGA Championship (2022–2026)

- Brooks Koepka

11. Recent winners of the U.S. Open (2022–2026)

12. Top 30 players from the 2025 FedEx Cup points list

- Harry Hall
- Im Sung-jae
- Andrew Novak
- Nick Taylor

13. Recent winners of The Players Championship (2024–2026)

14. Top five players, not already exempt, within the top 20 of the 2026 FedEx Cup points list through the Travelers Championship

- Alex Fitzpatrick

15. Top player, not already exempt, in the top 5 of the 2026 LIV Golf League individual standings through LIV Golf Andalucía

- Joaquín Niemann

16. Top five players from the OWGR's International Federation Ranking List as of Week 21, 2026

- Kazuki Higa
- Casey Jarvis
- Kota Kaneko
- Travis Smyth
- Scott Vincent

17. Winner of the 2025 Senior Open Championship

18. Winner of the 2025 U.S. Amateur (Note: Players must remain amateurs in order to be exempt under this category.)

- Mason Howell (a)

19. Recipient of the 2025 Mark H. McCormack Medal

- ~~Jackson Koivun~~ (Note: Forfeited his exemption by turning professional.)

20. Winner of the 2025 Asia-Pacific Amateur Championship

- Fifa Laopakdee (a)

21. Winner of the 2026 Latin America Amateur Championship

- Mateo Pulcini (a)

22. Winner of the 2026 Africa Amateur Championship

- Jack Buchanan (a)

23. Winner of the 2026 Amateur Championship

- Stuart Grehan (a)

24. Winner of the 2026 European Amateur

- Tim Wiedemeyer (a)

25. Winner of the 2026 Open Amateur Series (Note: Cumulative World Amateur Golf Ranking points from the St Andrews Links Trophy, The Amateur Championship, and the European Amateur.)

- Lev Grinberg (a)

==== Open Qualifying Series ====
The Open Qualifying Series (OQS) for the 2026 Open Championship consisted of 15 events. Places were available to the leading players (not otherwise exempt) who made the cut. In the event of ties, positions went to players ranked highest according to that week's OWGR.

Location	Tournament	Date	Spots	Qualifiers
Spain	Open de España	12 Oct 2025	1	Marco Penge (5,6)
Japan	Japan Open Golf Championship	19 Oct 2025	1	Naoyuki Kataoka
Hong Kong	Link Hong Kong Open	1 Nov 2025	1	Tom McKibbin
Australia	Crown Australian Open	7 Dec 2025	3	Michael Hollick, Kim Si-woo (5), Adam Scott (5)
New Zealand	New Zealand Open	1 Mar 2026	1	Lucas Herbert
South Africa	Investec South African Open Championship	1 Mar 2026	3	Casey Jarvis (16), Frédéric Lacroix, Francesco Laporta
Argentina	Visa Argentina Open	1 Mar 2026	1	Alistair Docherty
United States	Arnold Palmer Invitational	8 Mar 2026	1	Daniel Berger (5)
Singapore	Singapore Open	26 Apr 2026	2	Ham Jeong-woo, Cameron John
Korea	Kolon Korea Open	24 May 2026	1	Yang Ji-ho
Japan	Gateway to The Open Mizuno Open	31 May 2026	3	Ryutaro Nagano, Shaun Norris, Ren Yonezawa
United States	Memorial Tournament	7 Jun 2026	1	J. T. Poston
Canada	RBC Canadian Open	14 Jun 2026	3	Bud Cauley, Jackson Suber, Jesper Svensson
Italy	DS Automobiles Open d'Italia	28 Jun 2026	1	Eugenio Chacarra
Scotland	Genesis Scottish Open	12 Jul 2026	3	Johnny Keefer, Victor Perez, Michael Thorbjornsen

==== Final qualifying ====
Regional qualifying events were held on 22 June at 16 locations. Final qualifying events were played on 30 June at four locations.

Location	Spots	Qualifiers (Note: (R) – denotes a player who progressed through regional qualifying.)
Burnham & Berrow	5	Alejandro de Castro (a), James Nicholas, Tom Sloman (R), Caleb Surratt, Austen Truslow
Dundonald Links	5	Jack McDonald, Matthew Baldwin, David Howard (a,R), Nevill Ruiter (a), Marcus Plunkett
Royal Cinque Ports	5	M. J. Daffue, Antoine Rozner, Bård Skogen, Matthew Southgate, Peter Uihlein
West Lancashire	5	Sam Bairstow, Josele Ballester, Tiger Christensen (R), Matthew Jordan, Kazuma Kobori

==== Last-Chance Qualifier ====
One spot was given to the winner of an 18-hole qualifier held on 13 July, three days before the start of the Championship. The field for the Last-Chance Qualifier consisted of twelve players who narrowly failed to qualify through other means.

- Joe Dean

==== Additional players added to the field ====
In order to fill additional places or replace exempt players who had withdrawn prior to the start of the Championship, and maintain the full field of 156, additional players were taken in ranking order from the Official World Golf Ranking as of 6 July.

- Sam Stevens (46)
- Nico Echavarría (53)
- Pierceson Coody (58)
- Ryo Hisatsune (60)
- Michael Brennan (61)
- David Puig (64)
- Tom Kim (66)
- Eric Cole (67)
- Keith Mitchell (68)
- Matt Wallace (69)
- Sami Välimäki (71)
- Max Homa (73)
- Thomas Detry (74)
- Max Greyserman (75)
- Sahith Theegala (76)
- Aldrich Potgieter (77) (Note: Aldrich Potgieter replaced Louis Oosthuizen.)

== Round summaries ==
=== First round ===
Thursday, 16 July 2026

Jackson Suber, playing in his first Open Championship, shot a 5-under-par 65 to take a one stroke lead over Dan Brown and Im Sung-jae. Defending champion Scottie Scheffler was three strokes off the lead with a 68. Alex Smalley was leading until a double bogey on the 18th hole dropped him into a tied for third with a 67.

Place	Player	Score	To par
1	(United States) Jackson Suber	65	−5
T2	(England) Dan Brown	66	−4
T2	(South Korea) Im Sung-jae	66	−4
T4	(United States) Pierceson Coody	67	−3
T4	(South Africa) M. J. Daffue	67	−3
T4	(United States) Bryson DeChambeau	67	−3
T4	(Belgium) Thomas Detry	67	−3
T4	(United States) Ryan Gerard	67	−3
T4	(Scotland) Robert MacIntyre	67	−3
T4	(Italy) Francesco Molinari	67	−3
T4	(United States) Alex Smalley	67	−3
T4	(United States) Cameron Young	67	−3

=== Second round ===
Friday, 17 July 2026

Lucas Herbert, playing in his sixth Open Championship, shot an eight under round of 62 to take the lead by two shots. He was the sixth player to shoot 62 in a major championship. Herbert also shot a front nine in 28 strokes, tying an Open record set by Denis Durnian on the front nine 28 at the 1983 Open Championship on the same course. A missed 5-foot putt on 18th hole derailed his chance to set the record outright with a 61.

Sam Burns, a few groups after Herbert finished, also shot an eight under round of 62, including holing out from a bunker on 18th.

The other storyline came late in the second day when Bryson DeChambeau, who having finished up at the 18th at −7 for the tournament and shooting a four under round of 66, was approached by rules officials who informed DeChambeau of a possible penalty. After a video replay, DeChambeau and rules officials returned to the 5th hole, where the penalty occurred, and where DeChambeau had made a bogey five. DeChambeau was assessed a two stroke penalty for improving his lie on the 5th hole, which turned his four under round of 66 into a two under round of 68, joining a tie for 5th with Burns and Kim Si-woo.

Seventy-eight players made the cut which came at 141 (+1). Notables to miss the cut included 2022 champion Cameron Smith, 2026 PGA Championship winner Aaron Rai, 2026 U.S. Open winner Wyndham Clark, and Justin Rose, who finished as low amateur at the 1998 Open Championship, also held at Royal Birkdale. None of the ten amateurs in the field made the cut, which meant that the silver medal would not be awarded for the second year in a row.

Place	Player	Score	To par
1	(Australia) Lucas Herbert	70-62=132	−8
T2	(United States) Ryan Gerard	67-67=134	−6
T2	(United States) Jackson Suber	65-69=134	−6
T2	(United States) Cameron Young	67-67=134	−6
T5	(United States) Sam Burns	73-62=135	−5
T5	(United States) Bryson DeChambeau	67-68=135	−5
T5	(South Korea) Kim Si-woo	68-67=135	−5
T8	(United States) Bud Cauley	68-68=136	−4
T8	(Belgium) Thomas Detry	67-69=136	−4
T8	(England) Alex Fitzpatrick	69-67=136	−4
T8	(England) Tommy Fleetwood	69-67=136	−4
T8	(Scotland) Robert MacIntyre	67-69=136	−4
T8	(Italy) Francesco Molinari	67-69=136	−4
T8	(Spain) Jon Rahm	69-67=136	−4
T8	(United States) Scottie Scheffler	68-68=136	−4
T8	(England) Matt Wallace	69-67=136	−4

=== Third round ===
Saturday, 18 July 2026

Sam Burns, looking for his first major victory, after also coming close to the title at the previous major of the year, shot a five under 65 to take two shot lead at −10. Burns's 62-65 (127 strokes, thirteen under par) second and third rounds set the lowest consecutive 36 hole record in the Open Championship and in all major championship history.

Ryan Fox, who went out early during the third round, shot an eight under round of 62, joining Burns and Lucas Herbert, who shot 62 during the second round. Fox's 62 also set the record for most low rounds in any major with three. Fox's round also put him in a tie for second with Kim Si-woo at −8.

Lucas Herbert, the second round leader, came back to field with a one over 71. Herbert joined a tie for fourth with Ryan Gerard at −7.

Place	Player	Score	To par
1	(United States) Sam Burns	73-62-65=200	−10
T2	(New Zealand) Ryan Fox	72-68-62=202	−8
T2	(South Korea) Kim Si-woo	68-67-67=202	−8
T4	(United States) Ryan Gerard	67-67-69=203	−7
T4	(Australia) Lucas Herbert	70-62-71=203	−7
T6	(Sweden) Ludvig Åberg	71-66-67=204	−6
T6	(United States) Bryson DeChambeau	67-68-69=204	−6
T6	(United States) Jackson Suber	65-69-70=204	−6
T9	(England) Tommy Fleetwood	69-67-69=205	−5
T9	(Denmark) Rasmus Neergaard-Petersen	72-66-67=205	−5

=== Final round ===
Sunday, 19 July 2026

==== Summary ====
Ryan Fox of New Zealand, who began the final round two shots behind Sam Burns, overcame a dramatic back nine to win the 2026 Open Championship at Royal Birkdale. Fox shot a two under 68 to finish at 10-under-par and claim his first major championship by one stroke over Cameron Young. Fox made four birdies in his final six holes, including a 12-foot birdie putt on the 18th, to become only the second New Zealander to win the Open after Bob Charles in 1963.

Cameron Young, who began the day seven shots behind Burns, produced a remarkable six-under 64 to establish the clubhouse lead at nine under par. Young made three consecutive birdies to begin his round and reached the turn in five under for the day. He remained in the lead for more than two hours before Fox eventually caught him, but Young was unable to force a playoff after Fox birdied the 18th.

Sam Burns, the 54-hole leader, briefly extended his advantage to three shots with a birdie on the second hole, but his challenge subsequently unravelled. Burns made three bogeys during the front nine and could not recover, eventually shooting a two over 72 to finish alone in third at eight under par.

Scottie Scheffler, the defending champion, mounted an early challenge alongside local favourite Tommy Fleetwood. Scheffler shot a three under 67 to finish at seven under, while Fleetwood carded a 68 to join him in fourth. Fleetwood, who grew up in nearby Southport, received strong support from the Royal Birkdale galleries but was unable to maintain his challenge after dropping shots during the middle of his round.

Si Woo Kim, who began the final round tied for second at eight under, briefly moved into the lead before falling back with a two over 72. He finished in a tie for sixth at six under alongside Lucas Herbert and Casey Jarvis. Herbert, who had shot a 62 in the second round, also finished with a one over 71, while Jarvis closed with a four under 66 to join the group.

Fox's decisive moment came on the 18th. Tied with Young at nine under after birdieing the 16th, Fox drove into the centre of the fairway before hitting his approach to approximately 12 feet. Royal Birkdale's 18th had been the toughest hole of the championship, playing 161 strokes over par across the field, but Fox calmly rolled in the birdie putt to reach 10 under and win the Claret Jug. The victory made Fox the third New Zealander to win a men's major championship, joining Charles and Michael Campbell.

==== Final leaderboard ====
Champion
Silver Medal winner (low amateur)
(a) = amateur
(c) = past champion

Place	Player	Score	To par	Money ($)
1	(New Zealand) Ryan Fox	72-68-62-68=270	−10	3,200,000
2	(United States) Cameron Young	67-67-73-64=271	−9	1,842,000
3	(United States) Sam Burns	73-62-65-72=272	−8	1,181,000
T4	(England) Tommy Fleetwood	69-67-69-68=273	−7	827,500
T4	(United States) Scottie Scheffler	68-68-70-67=273	−7	827,500
T6	(Australia) Lucas Herbert	70-62-71-71=274	−6	550,883
T6	(South Africa) Casey Jarvis	73-67-68-66=274	−6	550,883
T6	(South Korea) Kim Si-woo	68-67-67-72=274	−6	550,883
T9	(Sweden) Ludvig Åberg	71-66-67-71=275	−5	336,380
T9	(United States) Ryan Gerard	67-67-69-72=275	−5	336,380
T9	(United States) Russell Henley	70-71-68-66=275	−5	336,380
T9	(Denmark) Rasmus Neergaard-Petersen	72-66-67-70=275	−5	336,380
T9	(Australia) Adam Scott	72-66-71-66=275	−5	336,380

Leaderboard below the top 10
Place	Player	Score	To par	Money ($)
T14	(Canada) Corey Conners	71-67-71-67=276	−4	234,325
T14	(United States) Bryson DeChambeau	67-68-69-72=276	−4	234,325
T14	(South Korea) Im Sung-jae	66-72-69-69=276	−4	234,325
T14	(Japan) Hideki Matsuyama	72-67-67-70=276	−4	234,325
T18	(England) Dan Brown	66-71-68-71=277	−3	164,575
T18	(United States) Bud Cauley	68-68-73-68=277	−3	164,575
T18	(United States) Rickie Fowler	71-69-71-66=277	−3	164,575
T18	(United States) Chris Gotterup	70-68-72-67=277	−3	164,575
T18	(Sweden) Alex Norén	71-69-69-68=277	−3	164,575
T18	(England) Marco Penge	72-68-69-68=277	−3	164,575
T18	(United States) Collin Morikawa (c)	68-70-70-69=277	−3	164,575
T18	(Norway) Kristoffer Reitan	69-71-68-69=277	−3	164,575
T18	(United States) Xander Schauffele (c)	71-69-66-71=277	−3	164,575
T18	(England) Jordan Smith	68-70-70-69=277	−3	164,575
T28	(United States) Jacob Bridgeman	70-69-68-71=278	−2	102,817
T28	(United States) Patrick Cantlay	71-68-71-68=278	−2	102,817
T28	(United States) Pierceson Coody	67-70-72-69=278	−2	102,817
T28	(United States) Max Homa	71-69-67-71=278	−2	102,817
T28	(Australia) Cameron John	70-67-69-72=278	−2	102,817
T28	(New Zealand) Kazuma Kobori	70-69-67-72=278	−2	102,817
T28	(United States) Brooks Koepka	70-71-69-68=278	−2	102,817
T28	(Republic of Ireland) Shane Lowry (c)	69-68-69-72=278	−2	102,817
T28	(Scotland) Robert MacIntyre	67-69-71-71=278	−2	102,817
T28	(France) Victor Perez	68-69-73-68=278	−2	102,817
T28	(England) John Parry	71-68-73-66=278	−2	102,817
T28	(United States) Jackson Suber	65-69-70-74=278	−2	102,817
T40	(Belgium) Thomas Detry	67-69-74-69=279	−1	69,750
T40	(United States) Kurt Kitayama	69-71-70-69=279	−1	69,750
T40	(Northern Ireland) Rory McIlroy (c)	72-67-69-71=279	−1	69,750
T40	(United States) J. J. Spaun	70-67-73-69=279	−1	69,750
T40	(United States) Michael Thorbjornsen	70-68-71-70=279	−1	69,750
T40	(England) Matt Wallace	69-67-72-71=279	−1	69,750
T46	(Spain) Josele Ballester	71-70-66-73=280	E	51,707
T46	(Spain) Eugenio Chacarra	70-70-71-79=280	E	51,707
T46	(South Africa) Hennie du Plessis	70-69-69-72=280	E	51,707
T46	(Italy) Francesco Molinari (c)	67-69-72-72=280	E	51,707
T46	(Spain) Jon Rahm	69-67-70-74=280	E	51,707
T46	(United States) Patrick Reed	72-66-71-71=280	E	51,707
T46	(England) Matthew Southgate	69-69-76-66=280	E	51,707
T53	(United States) Michael Brennan	72-68-70-71=281	+1	45,183
T53	(United States) Eric Cole	76-64-66-75=281	+1	45,183
T53	(Japan) Ryo Hisatsune	68-73-71-69=281	+1	45,183
T53	(South Africa) Shaun Norris	69-70-70-72=281	+1	45,183
T53	(United States) Alex Smalley	67-73-67-74=281	+1	45,183
T53	(United States) Sahith Theegala	71-69-68-73=281	+1	45,183
T59	(United States) Ben Griffin	69-70-74-69=282	+2	43,025
T59	(Japan) Naoyuki Kataoka	73-68-70-71=282	+2	43,025
T59	(United States) Johnny Keefer	70-68-71-73=282	+2	43,025
T59	(Australia) Min Woo Lee	70-71-71-70=282	+2	43,025
T59	(South Africa) Aldrich Potgieter	69-72-71-70=282	+2	43,025
T59	(Canada) Nick Taylor	68-71-72-71=282	+2	43,025
T65	(United States) Justin Thomas	70-69-68-76=283	+3	41,988
T65	(United States) Peter Uihlein	73-68-72-70=283	+3	41,988
T67	(Colombia) Nico Echavarría	71-67-69-77=284	+4	41,350
T67	(Austria) Sepp Straka	68-70-74-72=284	+4	41,350
T69	(England) Tyrrell Hatton	69-68-74-74=285	+5	40,800
T69	(England) Andy Sullivan	70-69-73-73=285	+5	40,800
T71	(England) Laurie Canter	69-71-74-72=286	+6	40,450
T71	(South Africa) M. J. Daffue	67-72-72-75=286	+6	40,450
T71	(England) Alex Fitzpatrick	69-67-73-77=286	+6	40,450
T74	(United States) Keegan Bradley	69-72-74-72=287	+7	40,075
T74	(Japan) Kazuki Higa	73-68-72-74=287	+7	40,075
T74	(United States) Marcus Plunkett	70-71-71-75=287	+7	40,075
77	(Scotland) Jack McDonald	70-71-73-74=288	+8	39,825
78	(Sweden) Jesper Svensson	73-66-77-73=289	+9	39,700
CUT	(United States) Harris English	73-69=142	+2	0
CUT	(New Zealand) Daniel Hillier	72-70=142	+2	0
CUT	(Denmark) Nicolai Højgaard	72-70=142	+2	0
CUT	(United States) Billy Horschel	71-71=142	+2	0
CUT	(United States) Mason Howell (a)	73-69=142	+2	0
CUT	(United States) Jake Knapp	71-71=142	+2	0
CUT	(United States) Matt McCarty	75-67=142	+2	0
CUT	(Northern Ireland) Tom McKibbin	71-71=142	+2	0
CUT	(Sweden) Joakim Lagergren	68-74=142	+2	0
CUT	(United States) Andrew Novak	73-69=142	+2	0
CUT	(United States) J. T. Poston	71-71=142	+2	0
CUT	(England) Aaron Rai	71-71=142	+2	0
CUT	(France) Antoine Rozner	69-73=142	+2	0
CUT	(South Africa) Jayden Schaper	70-72=142	+2	0
CUT	(Australia) Cameron Smith (c)	73-69=142	+2	0
CUT	(Sweden) Henrik Stenson (c)	68-74=142	+2	0
CUT	(United States) Sam Stevens	71-71=142	+2	0
CUT	(Finland) Sami Välimäki	70-72=142	+2	0
CUT	(Austria) Bernd Wiesberger	71-71=142	+2	0
CUT	(Spain) Ángel Ayora	72-71=143	+3	0
CUT	(United States) Wyndham Clark	70-73=143	+3	0
CUT	(Republic of Ireland) David Howard (a)	74-69=143	+3	0
CUT	(South Korea) Tom Kim	70-73=143	+3	0
CUT	(United States) Maverick McNealy	71-72=143	+3	0
CUT	(United States) Keith Mitchell	72-71=143	+3	0
CUT	(Japan) Ryutaro Nagano	71-72=143	+3	0
CUT	(Japan) Keita Nakajima	73-70-143	+3	0
CUT	(England) Justin Rose	75-68=143	+3	0
CUT	(Australia) Travis Smyth	71-72=143	+3	0
CUT	(United States) Akshay Bhatia	71-73=144	+4	0
CUT	(Australia) Jason Day	73-71=144	+4	0
CUT	(England) Joe Dean	72-72=144	+4	0
CUT	(England) Matt Fitzpatrick	72-72=144	+4	0
CUT	(England) Harry Hall	77-67=144	+4	0
CUT	(South Africa) Michael Hollick	72-72=144	+4	0
CUT	(Norway) Viktor Hovland	70-74=144	+4	0
CUT	(France) Frédéric Lacroix	72-72=144	+4	0
CUT	(Chile) Joaquín Niemann	76-78=144	+4	0
CUT	(Argentina) Mateo Pulcini (a)	75-69=144	+4	0
CUT	(Netherlands) Nevill Ruiter (a)	76-68=144	+4	0
CUT	(Norway) Bård Skogen	73-71=144	+4	0
CUT	(England) Tom Sloman	71-73=144	+4	0
CUT	(South Africa) Jack Buchanan (a)	73-72=145	+5	0
CUT	(United States) Alistair Docherty	73-72=145	+5	0
CUT	(United States) Max Greyserman	76-69=145	+5	0
CUT	(United States) Michael Kim	73-72=145	+5	0
CUT	(China) Li Haotong	72-72=145	+5	0
CUT	(United States) Daniel Berger	76-70=146	+6	0
CUT	(Spain) Alejandro de Castro (a)	73-73=146	+6	0
CUT	(Republic of Ireland) Stuart Grehan (a)	77-69=146	+6	0
CUT	(Denmark) Rasmus Højgaard	71-75=146	+6	0
CUT	(France) Adrien Saddier	77-69=146	+6	0
CUT	(Germany) Tim Wiedemeyer (a)	73-73=146	+6	0
CUT	(England) Sam Bairstow	72-75=147	+7	0
CUT	(England) Matthew Baldwin	72-75=147	+7	0
CUT	(Northern Ireland) Darren Clarke (c)	73-74=147	+7	0
CUT	(France) Martin Couvra	74-73=147	+7	0
CUT	(France) Lev Grinberg (a)	71-76=147	+7	0
CUT	(United States) Caleb Surratt	72-75=147	+7	0
CUT	(South Korea) Yang Ji-ho	77-70=147	+7	0
CUT	(United States) Stewart Cink (c)	73-74=148	+8	0
CUT	(Zimbabwe) Scott Vincent	75-73=148	+8	0
CUT	(England) Dan Bradbury	74-75=149	+9	0
CUT	(South Korea) Ham Jeong-woo	77-72=149	+9	0
CUT	(United States) Brian Harman (c)	74-75=149	+9	0
CUT	(Republic of Ireland) Pádraig Harrington (c)	80-69=149	+9	0
CUT	(England) Matthew Jordan	77-72=149	+9	0
CUT	(Japan) Kota Kaneko	72-77=149	+9	0
CUT	(Italy) Francesco Laporta	74-75=149	+9	0
CUT	(United States) Gary Woodland	78-71=149	+9	0
CUT	(Germany) Tiger Christensen	75-75=150	+10	0
CUT	(United States) David Duval (c)	73-77=150	+10	0
CUT	(United States) Jordan Spieth (c)	73-77=150	+10	0
CUT	(Spain) David Puig	74-77=151	+11	0
CUT	(United States) Austen Truslow	79-74=153	+13	0
CUT	(Thailand) Fifa Laopakdee (a)	75-80=165	+15	0
CUT	(Japan) Ren Yonezawa	76-79=155	+15	0
WD	(United States) James Nicholas	75	+5	0

==== Scorecard ====
Hole	1	2	3	4	5	6	7	8	9	10	11	12	13	14	15	16	17	18
Par	4	4	4	3	4	4	3	4	4	4	4	3	4	5	3	4	5	4
(New Zealand) Fox	−8	−9	−9	−9	−9	−9	−9	−9	−8	−8	−7	−7	−8	−9	−8	−9	−9	−10
(United States) Young	−4	−5	−6	−6	−7	−7	−7	−7	−8	−8	−8	−8	−8	−9	−9	−9	−10	−9
(United States) Burns	−10	−11	−11	−10	−9	−8	−8	−8	−8	−8	−8	−8	−8	−8	−8	−8	−8	−8
(England) Fleetwood	−6	−6	−6	−6	−7	−7	−7	−8	−7	−6	−5	−5	−5	−5	−5	−5	−6	−7
(United States) Scheffler	−5	−6	−6	−6	−7	−7	−7	−7	−7	−7	−7	−8	−7	−7	−6	−7	−8	−7
(Australia) Herbert	−7	−7	−6	−6	−7	−6	−6	−6	−7	−8	−7	−7	−7	−7	−7	−7	−6	−6
(South Korea) Kim	−8	−8	−8	−8	−9	−10	−10	−10	−10	−10	−9	−8	−8	−8	−8	−7	−7	−6
(Sweden) Åberg	−6	−6	−5	−5	−5	−5	−4	−4	−5	−5	−5	−5	−5	−5	−5	−5	−6	−5
(United States) Gerard	−7	−7	−7	−7	−6	−6	−6	−6	−6	−6	−6	−6	−6	−6	−6	−6	−6	−5
(United States) DeChambeau	−6	−6	−6	−6	−6	−6	−6	−6	−5	−5	−2	−2	−3	−4	−4	−4	−4	−4
(United States) Suber	−5	−5	−5	−5	−5	−5	−5	−4	−4	−4	−4	−4	−3	−4	−3	−3	−2	−2

Cumulative tournament scores, relative to par

Birdie	Bogey	Double bogey	Triple bogey+
