= Biltmore Championship Asheville =

Golf tournament

Tournament information
- Location: Asheville, North Carolina
- Established: 2026
- Course: The Cliffs at Walnut Grove
- Par: 71
- Length: 7,249 yards (6,628 m)
- Tour: PGA Tour
- Format: Stroke play
- Prize fund: $5,000,000
- Month played: September

Tournament record score
- Aggregate: 258 Jacob Bridgeman (2026)
- To par: −26 as above

Current champion
- (United States) Jacob Bridgeman

Location map
- Location within the United States Location within North Carolina

The Biltmore Championship Asheville is a golf tournament on the PGA Tour. It is played at The Cliffs at Walnut Grove in Asheville, North Carolina. It was first played in 2026 as part of the FedEx Cup Fall series.

Jacob Bridgeman won the inaugural tournament with a two stroke victory over Ben James.

== Winners ==
Year	Winner	Score	To par	Margin of victory	Runner-up
2026	(United States) Jacob Bridgeman	258	−26	2 strokes	(United States) Ben James
