= David Perkins =

David Perkins may refer to:

- David Perkins (footballer) (born 1982), English footballer
- David Perkins (geneticist) (1919–2007), American geneticist
- David Perkins (golfer), American golfer
- David G. Perkins (born 1957), United States Army general
