= 2025 PGA Tour Americas =

Golf tour season

2025 PGA Tour Americas season
- Duration: March 27, 2025 – September 28, 2025
- Number of official events: 16
- Most wins: (United States) Michael Brennan (3)
- Points list: (United States) Michael Brennan

The 2025 PGA Tour Americas was the second season of PGA Tour Americas, a third-tier tour operated and run by the PGA Tour.

== Schedule ==
The following table lists official events during the 2025 season.

Date	Tournament	Host country	Purse (US$)	Winner (Note: The number in parentheses after each winner's name is the number of PGA Tour Americas events they had won up to and including that tournament. It is rare for someone to accumulate many wins on PGA Tour Americas as success at this level usually leads to promotion to the Korn Ferry Tour.)	OWGR points
Mar 30	Abierto del Centro	Argentina	225,000	(United States) Ryan Grider (1)	7.74
Apr 6	ECP Brazil Open	Brazil	225,000	(United States) Maxwell Moldovan (1)	7.97
Apr 27	Kia Open	Ecuador	225,000	(United States) Jay Card III (1)	7.83
May 4	Diners Club Peru Open	Peru	225,000	(United States) Hunter Wolcott (1)	8.27
May 11	Bupa Championship	Mexico	225,000	(United States) John Marshall Butler (1)	8.11
May 25	Inter Rapidisimo Golf Championship	Colombia	225,000	(United States) Davis Lamb (n/a) (Note: Shortened to 36 holes due to weather. Due to the event's length, this win is not officially recognized as a PGA Tour Americas victory.)	5.99
Jul 6	Explore NB Open	Canada	225,000	(United States) David Perkins (1)	8.68
Jul 14	Bromont Open	Canada	225,000	(United States) Dillon Stewart (1)	8.65
Jul 27	Commissionaires Ottawa Open	Canada	225,000	(United States) Brett White (1)	8.77
Aug 3	Osprey Valley Open	Canada	225,000	(United States) Carson Bacha (1)	9.41
Aug 10	BioSteel Championship	Canada	225,000	(United States) Michael Brennan (1)	9.54
Aug 24	Manitoba Open	Canada	225,000	(United States) Theo Humphrey (n/a)	7.30
Aug 31	CRMC Championship	United States	225,000	(United States) Michael Brennan (2)	9.73
Sep 14	ATB Classic	Canada	225,000	(United States) Michael Brennan (3)	9.65
Sep 21	Times Colonist Victoria Open	Canada	225,000	(Canada) Drew Nesbitt (1)	9.72
Sep 28	Fortinet Cup Championship	Canada	225,000	(United States) Jay Card III (2)	7.71

== Points list ==
The points list was titled as the Fortinet Cup and was based on tournament results during the season, calculated using a points-based system. The top 10 players on the points list earned status to play on the 2026 Korn Ferry Tour.

Position	Player	Points
1	(United States) Michael Brennan (Note: Brennan won the Bank of Utah Championship during the 2025 PGA Tour's FedEx Cup Fall series; securing immediate promotion to the PGA Tour with a two year exemption. Therefore, his 2026 Korn Ferry Tour status was relinquished.)	2,534
2	(United States) Jay Card III	1,603
3	(United States) Davis Lamb	1,459
4	(United States) David Perkins	1,266
5	(United States) Brett White	1,133
6	(United States) Derek Hitchner	924
7	(United States) John Marshall Butler	882
8	(Canada) Drew Nesbitt	846
9	(United States) Theo Humphrey	827
10	(United States) Carson Bacha	817
