= 2026 FedEx Cup Playoffs =

Tournament information
- Dates: August 13–30, 2026
- Location: TPC Southwind; Bellerive Country Club; East Lake Golf Club
- Tour: PGA Tour

Statistics
- Field: 70 for FedEx St. Jude Ch. 50 for BMW Championship; 30 for Tour Championship
- Prize fund: $40,000,000 (Tour Championship)
- Winner's share: $10,000,000 (Tour Championship)

Champion
- (United States) Scottie Scheffler
- −16 (264)

The 2026 FedEx Cup Playoffs, the series of three golf tournaments that determined the 2026 season champion on the U.S.-based PGA Tour, was played from August 13–30. It included the following three events:

- FedEx St. Jude Championship – TPC Southwind, Memphis, Tennessee
- BMW Championship – Bellerive Country Club, Town and Country, Missouri
- Tour Championship – East Lake Golf Club, Atlanta, Georgia

This will be the 20th FedEx Cup playoffs since their inception in 2007.

The point distributions can be seen here.

== Regular season rankings ==
| # | Player | Points | Events |
|---|---|---|---|
| 1 | (United States) Scottie Scheffler | 4,123 | 17 |
| 2 | (England) Matt Fitzpatrick | 3,329 | 18 |
| 3 | (United States) Cameron Young | 3,161 | 17 |
| 4 | (United States) Wyndham Clark | 2,255 | 20 |
| 5 | (United States) Chris Gotterup | 2,254 | 20 |
| 6 | (United States) Collin Morikawa | 2,229 | 14 |
| 7 | (South Korea) Kim Si-woo | 2,201 | 21 |
| 8 | (United States) Sam Burns | 2,078 | 17 |
| 9 | (England) Tommy Fleetwood | 2,046 | 16 |
| 10 | (Sweden) Ludvig Åberg | 1,929 | 17 |

== Playoff tournaments ==
=== FedEx St. Jude Championship ===
The FedEx St. Jude Championship was played August 13–16; 70 players were eligible, and there was no second-round cut. Of the 70 eligible players, only Daniel Berger did not play. Scottie Scheffler won the tournament and Im Sung-jae played his way into the next event by finishing tied-5th and moving from 53rd to 40th in the rankings. Keith Mitchell was the only golfer to play his way out of the playoffs, falling from 49th to 51st with a tied-34th finish.

| | | | | | FedEx Cup rank | |
| Place | Player | Score | To par | Winnings ($) | Before | After |
|---|---|---|---|---|---|---|
| 1 | (United States) Scottie Scheffler | 68-61-68-66=263 | −17 | 3,600,000 | 1 | 1 |
| 2 | (South Korea) Kim Si-woo | 70-68-65-68=271 | −9 | 2,160,000 | 7 | 4 |
| T3 | (United States) Sam Burns | 67-70-62-73=272 | −8 | 1,160,000 | 8 | 6 |
| T3 | (Sweden) Alex Norén | 71-66-66-69=272 | −8 | 1,160,000 | 46 | 34 |
| T5 | (United States) Wyndham Clark | 69-66-70-68=273 | −7 | 760,000 | 4 | 5 |
| T5 | (South Korea) Im Sung-jae | 66-66-67-74=273 | −7 | 760,000 | 53 | 40 |
| T7 | (Sweden) Ludvig Åberg | 68-65-74-67=274 | −6 | 582,000 | 10 | 10 |
| T7 | (England) Tommy Fleetwood | 66-68-68-72=274 | −6 | 582,000 | 9 | 8 |
| T7 | (United States) Jake Knapp | 65-70-67-72=274 | −6 | 582,000 | 40 | 35 |
| T7 | (Japan) Hideki Matsuyama | 66-70-67-71=274 | −6 | 582,000 | 20 | 16 |
| T7 | (United States) Xander Schauffele | 67-72-68-67=274 | −6 | 582,000 | 11 | 11 |

=== BMW Championship ===
The BMW Championship was played August 20–23; 50 players were eligible, and there was no second-round cut.

| | | | | | FedEx Cup rank | |
| Place | Player | Score | To par | Winnings ($) | Before | After |
|---|---|---|---|---|---|---|
| 1 | (United States) Wyndham Clark | 64-64-65-70=263 | −17 | 3,600,000 | 5 | 3 |
| 2 | (United States) Patrick Cantlay | 67-65-66-68=266 | −14 | 2,160,000 | 43 | 19 |
| 3 | (Northern Ireland) Rory McIlroy | 64-69-65-69=267 | −13 | 1,360,000 | 13 | 11 |
| T4 | (United States) Chris Gotterup | 64-67-68-69=268 | −12 | 856,667 | 7 | 6 |
| T4 | (United States) Collin Morikawa | 68-65-67-68=268 | −12 | 856,667 | 9 | 7 |
| T4 | (United States) Gary Woodland | 64-65-70-69=268 | −12 | 856,667 | 31 | 18 |
| T7 | (Scotland) Robert MacIntyre | 68-69-68-65=270 | −10 | 667,500 | 35 | 25 |
| T7 | (United States) Maverick McNealy | 67-66-69-68=270 | −10 | 667,500 | 49 | 42 |
| 9 | (United States) Jacob Bridgeman | 66-72-66-67=271 | −9 | 600,000 | 12 | 13 |
| T10 | (United States) Michael Brennan | 69-65-69-69=272 | −8 | 540,000 | 48 | 46 |
| T10 | (South Korea) Im Sung-jae | 67-64-70-71=272 | −8 | 540,000 | 40 | 37 |

=== Tour Championship ===
The Tour Championship was played August 27–30; 30 players were eligible, and there was no second-round cut.

== Table of qualified players ==
Table key:

Win
Top-10 finish
Did not advance to next tournament
Played way into next tournament

| | Player | Pre-Playoffs | | FedEx St. Jude Championship | | BMW Championship | | Tour Championship | |
| | Player | Points | Rank | Finish | Rank after | Finish | Rank after | Finish | Final rank |
|---|---|---|---|---|---|---|---|---|---|
| (United States) | Scottie Scheffler | 4,873 | 1 | 1 | 1 | T12 | 1 | 1 | 1 |
| (England) | Matt Fitzpatrick | 3,426 | 2 | T12 | 2 | T28 | 2 | T21 | 21 |
| (United States) | Cameron Young | 3,183 | 3 | T39 | 3 | T37 | 4 | T11 | 11 |
| (United States) | Wyndham Clark | 2,543 | 4 | T5 | 5 | 1 | 3 | T21 | 21 |
| (United States) | Chris Gotterup | 2,288 | 5 | T30 | 7 | T4 | 6 | T4 | 4 |
| (United States) | Collin Morikawa | 2,242 | 6 | T52 | 9 | T4 | 7 | T14 | 14 |
| (South Korea) | Kim Si-woo | 2,701 | 7 | 2 | 4 | T33 | 5 | T14 | 14 |
| (United States) | Sam Burns | 2,416 | 8 | T3 | 6 | T28 | 8 | T18 | 18 |
| (England) | Tommy Fleetwood | 2,247 | 9 | T7 | 8 | T47 | 9 | T11 | 11 |
| (Sweden) | Ludvig Åberg | 2,130 | 10 | T7 | 10 | T16 | 10 | T4 | 4 |
| (United States) | Xander Schauffele | 1,981 | 11 | T7 | 11 | T26 | 12 | T14 | 14 |
| (Northern Ireland) | Rory McIlroy | 1,745 | 12 | 66 | 13 | 3 | 11 | T4 | 4 |
| (United States) | Jacob Bridgeman | 1,761 | 13 | T30 | 12 | 9 | 13 | T4 | 4 |
| (United States) | Akshay Bhatia | 1,730 | 14 | 67 | 14 | T12 | 15 | T18 | 18 |
| (United States) | Russell Henley | 1,740 | 15 | T30 | 15 | T12 | 14 | T4 | 4 |
| (United States) | Ryan Gerard | 1,540 | 16 | T24 | 17 | T16 | 17 | 3 | 3 |
| (Australia) | Min Woo Lee | 1,481 | 17 | T55 | 18 | T47 | 21 | T4 | 4 |
| (Norway) | Kristoffer Reitan* | 1,474 | 18 | T58 | 19 | T22 | 20 | 25 | 25 |
| (England) | Alex Fitzpatrick* | 1,415 | 19 | T61 | 20 | T44 | 24 | T4 | 4 |
| (Japan) | Hideki Matsuyama | 1,600 | 20 | T7 | 16 | T28 | 16 | T21 | 21 |
| (United States) | J. J. Spaun | 1,413 | 21 | T34 | 21 | T22 | 22 | WD | 30 |
| (New Zealand) | Ryan Fox | 1,352 | 22 | T58 | 25 | T47 | 30 | 26 | 26 |
| (Norway) | Viktor Hovland | 1,397 | 23 | T19 | 22 | T33 | 26 | 2 | 2 |
| (England) | Justin Rose | 1,355 | 24 | T39 | 24 | T22 | 27 | T18 | 18 |
| (United States) | Alex Smalley | 1,375 | 25 | T24 | 23 | T16 | 23 | 27 | 27 |
| (South Korea) | Tom Kim | 1,341 | 26 | T12 | 26 | T28 | 29 | T14 | 14 |
| (United States) | Gary Woodland | 1,257 | 27 | T42 | 31 | T4 | 18 | 20 | 29 |
| (United States) | Rickie Fowler | 1,257 | 28 | T34 | 30 | T37 | 33 | – | 33 |
| (Australia) | Adam Scott | 1,315 | 29 | T12 | 27 | T16 | 28 | T11 | 11 |
| (United States) | J. T. Poston | 1,237 | 30 | T24 | 32 | T22 | 32 | – | 32 |
| (Scotland) | Robert MacIntyre | 1,191 | 31 | WD | 35 | T7 | 25 | 28 | 28 |
| (Denmark) | Nicolai Højgaard* | 1,182 | 32 | T34 | 36 | T41 | 35 | – | 35 |
| (United States) | Kurt Kitayama | 1,258 | 33 | T12 | 28 | T26 | 31 | – | 31 |
| (United States) | Bud Cauley | 1,257 | 34 | T12 | 29 | T44 | 34 | – | 34 |
| (England) | Aaron Rai | 1,146 | 35 | T63 | 37 | T16 | 39 | – | 39 |
| (United States) | Ben Griffin | 1,124 | 36 | T42 | 38 | T44 | 41 | – | 41 |
| (Austria) | Sepp Straka | 1,122 | 37 | T34 | 39 | T33 | 40 | – | 40 |
| (United States) | Michael Thorbjornsen* | 1,051 | 38 | T47 | 41 | T37 | 44 | – | 44 |
| (United States) | Justin Thomas | 1,027 | 39 | T47 | 44 | T16 | 43 | – | 43 |
| (United States) | Jake Knapp | 1,206 | 40 | T7 | 33 | T41 | 38 | – | 38 |
| (Colombia) | Nico Echavarría | 1,039 | 41 | T12 | 42 | 50 | 45 | – | 45 |
| (United States) | Patrick Cantlay | 1,029 | 42 | T12 | 43 | 2 | 19 | T21 | 19 |
| (Japan) | Ryo Hisatsune* | 909 | 43 | T52 | 45 | T12 | 47 | – | 47 |
| (United States) | Sahith Theegala | 898 | 44 | 67 | 46 | T41 | 48 | – | 48 |
| (United States) | Eric Cole | 875 | 45 | T58 | 47 | T28 | 49 | – | 49 |
| (Sweden) | Alex Norén | 1197 | 46 | T3 | 34 | T37 | 36 | – | 36 |
| (United States) | Michael Brennan* | 876 | 47 | T42 | 48 | T10 | 46 | – | 46 |
| (United States) | Matt McCarty* | 846 | 48 | T63 | 50 | T33 | 50 | – | 50 |
| (United States) | Keith Mitchell | 837 | 49 | T34 | 51 | – | – | – | 51 |
| (United States) | Maverick McNealy | 863 | 50 | T19 | 49 | T7 | 42 | – | 42 |
| (United States) | Harris English | 798 | 51 | T42 | 54 | – | – | – | 54 |
| (United States) | Max Homa | 811 | 52 | T24 | 53 | – | – | – | 53 |
| (South Korea) | Im Sung-jae | 1052 | 53 | T5 | 40 | T10 | 37 | – | 37 |
| (United States) | Jordan Spieth | 819 | 54 | T19 | 52 | – | – | – | 52 |
| (United States) | Sam Stevens | 760 | 55 | T42 | 57 | – | – | – | 57 |
| (United States) | Pierceson Coody* | 796 | 56 | T19 | 55 | – | – | – | 55 |
| (Canada) | Sudarshan Yellamaraju* | 752 | 57 | T47 | 58 | – | – | – | 58 |
| (England) | Harry Hall | 777 | 58 | T24 | 56 | – | – | – | 56 |
| (Canada) | Corey Conners | 730 | 59 | T47 | 59 | – | – | – | 59 |
| (United States) | Daniel Berger | 709 | 60 | DNP | 60 | – | – | – | 60 |
| (United States) | Michael Kim | 706 | 61 | T55 | 61 | – | – | – | 61 |
| (Republic of Ireland) | Shane Lowry | 683 | 62 | T52 | 62 | – | – | – | 62 |
| (Canada) | Nick Taylor | 668 | 63 | T39 | 64 | – | – | – | 64 |
| (England) | Jordan Smith* | 638 | 64 | T55 | 66 | – | – | – | 66 |
| (United States) | Brian Harman | 643 | 65 | T30 | 65 | – | – | – | 65 |
| (United States) | Patrick Rodgers | 657 | 66 | T19 | 64 | – | – | – | 64 |
| (South Africa) | Aldrich Potgieter | 599 | 67 | T61 | 68 | – | – | – | 68 |
| (United States) | Ricky Castillo* | 598 | 68 | T63 | 69 | – | – | – | 69 |
| (Germany) | Matti Schmid | 597 | 69 | T47 | 70 | – | – | – | 70 |
| (United States) | Jackson Koivun* | 625 | 70 | T24 | 67 | – | – | – | 67 |

* First-time Playoffs qualifier
DNP = did not play
WD = withdrew
