= Jackson Suber =

American professional golfer (born 1999)

Personal information
- Full name: John Weatherington Suber III
- Nickname: The Detective
- Nationality: United States
- Born: October 18, 1999 (age 27) Tampa, Florida, U.S.
- Height: 6 ft 1 in (185 cm)
- Weight: 175 lb (79 kg)

Career
- Sport: Golf
- College: University of Mississippi
- Turned professional: 2022
- Current tour: PGA Tour
- Former tours: Korn Ferry Tour; PGA Tour Canada
- Highest ranking: 94 (September 20, 2026) (as of October 25, 2026)

Best results in major championships
- Masters Tournament: DNP
- PGA Championship: DNP
- U.S. Open: 73rd: 2024
- The Open Championship: T28: 2026

John Weatherington Suber III (born October 18, 1999) is an American professional golfer from Tampa, Florida. He plays on the PGA Tour, after earning his Tour card by finishing 20th on the 2024 Korn Ferry Tour points list. Suber had a standout amateur career at the University of Mississippi, where he became the first Ole Miss golfer to reach No. 1 in the Golfstat national rankings.

== Early life ==
Suber was born on October 18, 1999, in Tampa, Florida, to Elayne and Jack Suber. He attended Henry B. Plant High School, where he was a four-year letterwinner in golf. He led the team to district and regional championships all four years, and the Florida 3A state title in 2016. Suber posted a 71.0 stroke average in high school and earned local Player of the Year honors in 2016. He was also a member of the 2018 Wyndham Cup team.

== College and amateur career ==
Suber played four seasons (2018–2022) for the Ole Miss Rebels men's golf team. He recorded five individual tournament victories and compiled a career stroke average of 71.16, ranking third all-time at Ole Miss in career individual wins.

In 2020–21 he won the Jerry Pate National Intercollegiate and LSU Invitational and earned PING All-American Honorable Mention and First Team All-Southeastern Conference (SEC) honors. He received multiple academic honors throughout his college career.

As a senior in 2021–22, he earned PING Second Team All-American and Golfweek Third Team All-American honors, along with First Team All-SEC recognition. He won three tournaments that season, including the NCAA Division I Norman Regional individual championship (the first in program history). Entering the 2022 spring season, Suber became the first Ole Miss golfer to reach No. 1 in the Golfstat national rankings.

== Professional career ==
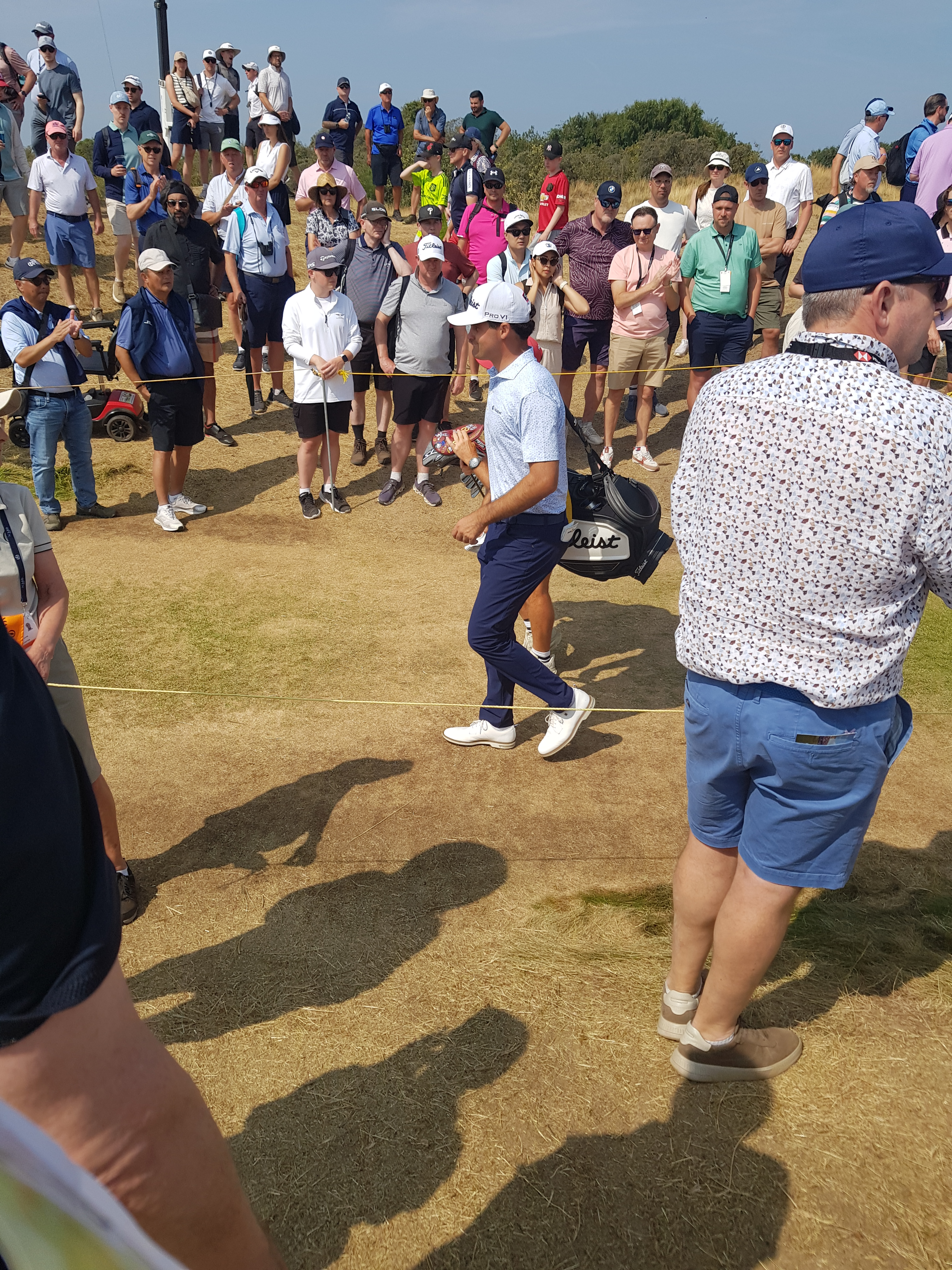
Suber at the 2026 Open Championship

Suber turned professional in June 2022. He played on the PGA Tour Canada that year, and made his PGA Tour debut at the 2022 Valspar Championship, playing as an amateur. In 2023, his first season on the Korn Ferry Tour, he finished 37th on the points list.

In 2024, Suber finished 20th on the Korn Ferry Tour points list, earning full PGA Tour membership for 2025. He recorded back-to-back top-three finishes and three other top-10 results during the 2024 season. He made his major championship debut at the 2024 U.S. Open as an alternate, made the cut, and finished tied for 73rd.

In his 2025 PGA Tour rookie season, his best result was a tie for sixth at the Sony Open in Hawaii.

In the 2026 season, Suber achieved his career-best PGA Tour finish with solo fourth place at the CJ Cup Byron Nelson (−23). He also qualified for his second U.S. Open. With his tie for fourth at the 2026 RBC Canadian Open, Suber made the field for the 2026 Open Championship at Royal Birkdale and was the first round leader. Tied for sixth after 54 holes, his four-over 74 on Sunday dropped him into a tie for 28th place.

== Amateur wins ==
- 2020 Jerry Pate National Intercollegiate
- 2021 LSU Invitational, White Sands Bahamas Invitation
- 2022 Irish Creek Intercollegiate, NCAA Norman Regional

== Results in major championships ==
Tournament	2024	2025	2026
Masters Tournament			
PGA Championship			
U.S. Open	73		CUT
The Open Championship			T28

Did not play

CUT = missed the half-way cut
"T" indicates a tie for a place

== See also ==
- 2024 Korn Ferry Tour graduates
