= David Perkins (golfer) =

American professional golfer (born 1998)

Personal information
- Full name: David A. Perkins
- Nationality: United States
- Born: June 15, 1998 (age 28) Peoria, Illinois, U.S.
- Height: 5 ft 8 in (173 cm)
- Weight: 170 lb (77 kg)
- Spouse: Kayla

Career
- Sport: Golf
- College: Illinois State University
- Turned professional: 2021
- Current tour: PGA Tour Americas
- Professional wins: 2

David A. Perkins (born June 15, 1998) is a professional golfer from Illinois who competes in the PGA Tour Americas, the third-tier professional circuit under the PGA Tour.

== Early life ==
Perkins was born on June 15, 1998, to parents Tony and Laureen. He attended East Peoria Community High School where he was a three-sport athlete, competing in golf, basketball, and baseball. His freshman year, he averaged a score of 76 over 18 holes while his sophomore year he averaged 74 over 18 holes. As a junior he averaged 73.5 over 18 holes and was subsequently named first-team all-conference. He placed 28th at that year's state championship, setting multiple school records. In his final year, he averaged 72.5 over 18 holes and would be awarded as first-team Mid-Illini and all-conference. He placed 12th in his final state championship appearance. He accepted an athletic scholarship to play men's golf for the Illinois State University Redbirds.

== College career ==
=== Freshman year (2016–17) ===
Perkins made his college debut for the Redbirds at the Badger Invitational, finishing at 5-under par to claim 5th place. He earned the MVC Tri-Men's Golfer of the Week for his performance. He shot 3-under par at the Firestone Invitational and finish 20th at the Oral Roberts' Bob Sitton Invitational and 9th at the I-74 Challenge. He tied 16th at his first MVC Championship, finishing the year with an average of 73.2 per round.

=== Sophomore year (2017–18) ===
Perkins tied 25th in the Ram Masters Invitational while shooting a 6-over par score at the Badger Invitational.

=== Junior year (2018–19) ===
He shot an 8-under at the annual Badger Invitational, the 9th best total score for the event's history. This performance would lead to his first of three MVC Golfer of the Week Awards he received over the 2018–19 season. His other two awards would come following his performances at the Mobile Bay Intercollegiate and the Boilermaker Invitational. He maintained a spot in ISU's top five scorers for much of the season. He averaged a score of 72 per round.

=== Senior year and fifth year (2019–2021) ===
Perkins played an extra year due to closures during the COVID-19 pandemic. During 2020, he scored on average 69.39 per round, setting the lowest MVC single season average since 2003. He won that year's Golfweek Conference Challenge with a score of 10-under par. He was awarded the 2020 MVC Golfer of the Year, MVC Scholar-Athlete of the Year, and was placed as PING Third Team All American and onto the Ben Hogan Award Watch List. He ended his career at ISU in May 2021, with a career average of 72.3 per round, and setting multiple school records for the college.

== Professional career ==
Perkins turned professional in 2021 shortly after the completion of his collegiate career. He made the cut for both tournaments he entered on the Forme Tour. He missed the cut at the John Deere Classic after earning a sponsor exemption, shooting rounds of 72 and 70. He was awarded conditional status on PGA Tour Canada via the qualifying school.

Perkins played in multiple tournaments on PGA Tour Americas, the Forme Tour, and PGA Tour Canada. He achieved minor wins on the Minor League Golf Tour, including a victory decided by an eagle during a playoff. His first major professional win was on August 3, 2022, at the 73rd Illinois Open Championship with a 6-under par score. He earned $23,168 for his first victory.

He finished in 2nd place at the mid-season Q-School for PGA Tour Americas and subsequently gained exemption for the remainder of the 2024 season. He finished 28th on the 2024 points list, ensuring that he retained his membership to the 2025 Latin America Swing of PGA Tour Americas.

Perkins began the 2025 PGA Tour Americas season with numerous top-10 finishes, including a 3rd place finish at the Diners Club Peru Open. In July 2025, he claimed his first PGA Tour-sanctioned win at the Explore NB Open in Fredericton, Canada where he shot a total 19-under par 265. The victory earned him $40,500 and 500 Fortinet Cup points, propelling him to first place in the standings at the time.

== Amateur wins ==
- 2018 CDGA Amateur Championship
- 2019 Golfweek Conference Challenge

== Professional wins (2) ==
=== PGA Tour Americas wins (1) ===
No.	Date	Tournament	Winning score	Margin of victory	Runner-up
1	Jul 6, 2025	Explore NB Open	−19 (65-65-68-67=265)	1 stroke	(United States) Tripp Kinney

=== Other wins (1) ===
- 2022 Illinois Open Championship
