= Blades Brown =

American professional golfer (born 2007)

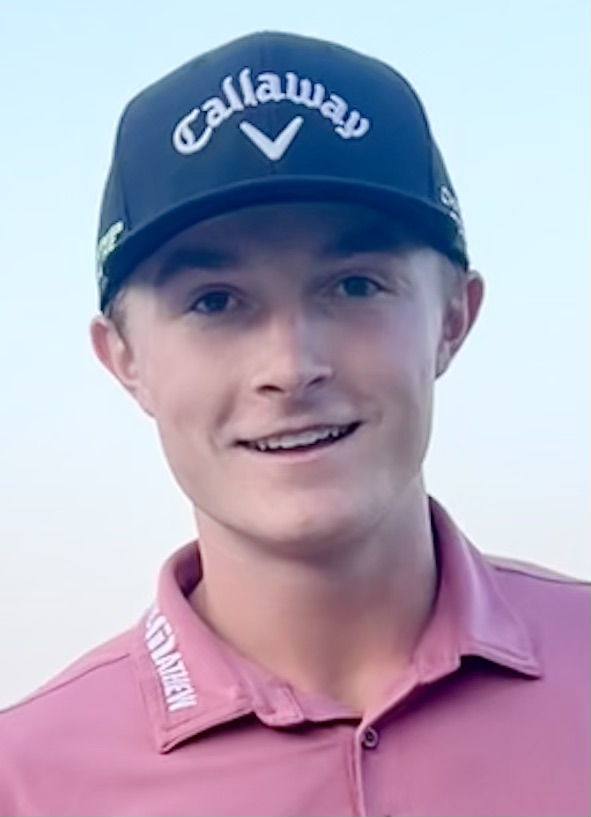
- Brown in September 2025

Personal information
- Nationality: United States
- Born: May 21, 2007 (age 19) Nashville, Tennessee, U.S.

Career
- Sport: Golf
- Turned professional: 2024
- Current tour: PGA Tour
- Former tour: Korn Ferry Tour
- Professional wins: 1
- Highest ranking: 62 (November 8, 2026) (as of November 8, 2026)

Number of wins by tour
- PGA Tour: 1

Blades Brown (born May 21, 2007) is an American professional golfer from Nashville, Tennessee who at age 16 broke Bobby Jones' record as the youngest medalist at stroke play in U.S. Amateur history. Jones set the record at age 18 (1920), and it remained unbroken for 103 years. Brown's performance in the U.S. Amateur enabled him to compete in his first PGA Tour event where he performed with distinction, 10 under par. Despite numerous college golf offers, he elected to go directly from high school to enter professional golf in January 2025.

== Early life ==
His father, Parke Brown, is a Nashville businessman who played golf with Blades at Nashville's Richland Country Club since Blades was eight years old. The father said, "He's not always winning. . . he's growing and showing he's resilient". From childhood, Brown was taught basketball as well as golf. Brown's mother Rhonda Blades played professional basketball in the WNBA, and was the first player in the WNBA to score a 3-point shot. She was inducted into the Missouri Sports Hall of Fame in 2023. His older sister Millie was the main basketball protégé of their mother. Millie made more than 220 three-pointers in her high school basketball career, leading her team to win the state high school championship in 2018. Blades said his main childhood mission was "to be as good of a shooter as my sister is." His mother, Rhonda, said, "I've taught and coached high school kids for 24 and a half years, and Blades a little different. He's a little more mature...his personality is perfect for the golf course."

== Amateur career ==
In 2023, the 16-year-old Brown, then a high school sophomore, shot a course record 64 at Colorado Golf Club during the 123rd U.S. Amateur hosted at Cherry Hills Country Club, tying for first place in the tournament's stroke play portion. Brown went on to win the 2023 Elite Invitational at the Tradition Golf Club in Pawleys Island, South Carolina with a final-round 64. The Tennessean named him high school "Sportsperson of the Year" for 2024. Brown joined Tiger Woods and Bobby Clampett in 2023 as the only players to win a medal in both U.S. Amateur and U.S. Junior competitions.

He earned entry into the national golf tournament after playing a qualifying round in July 2023, at the Franklin Bridge Golf Club in Franklin, Tennessee, where he shot a 62 in the final round. His impressive performance in the U.S. Amateur opened the door to a sponsor's exemption allowing him to compete in his first PGA Tour event, the 2024 Myrtle Beach Classic. At Myrtle Beach, he made the cut and tied for 26th, finishing 10 under par. In November 2024, he was ranked number 1 in the Junior Golf Scoreboard, number 1 in the American Junior Golf Association and number 79 in the World Amateur Golf Ranking.

In May 2024, he and fellow Tennessean Jackson Herrington finished runner-up in the U.S. Amateur Four-Ball to Brian Blanchard and Sam Engel. Brown won three consecutive TSSAA golf individual state championships (2021–2023) for his high school, Nashville's Brentwood Academy. In July 2024, after his sophomore year, he announced he would leave his high school to better manage his golf schedule, and that he planned to continue his studies online with Laurel Springs School. However, on December 17, 2024, he announced that, despite being pursued by the nation's top collegiate programs, he had decided to forego college golf and pursue a full-time professional career. Brown said he was proud of his amateur accomplishments, but wanted to focus on his pro career, saying, "I am delighted to make my professional debut (at the American Express Golf Tournament)". By this time he was being represented by a sports marketing agency, and had NIL deals with Callaway and a New Jersey-based financial advisory firm.

== Professional career ==
In 2025, Brown played primarily on the Korn Ferry Tour with temporary status, but received exemptions to play in several PGA Tour events. At his debut as a pro golfer at The American Express on the PGA Tour in January 2025, Brown started with even par the first round, and a 64 in the second. This latter score was the third lowest in a PGA Tour event by a player under age 18 in the past 40 years. However, his third round produced a 2-over-par 74, and he missed the cut by 3 strokes. He played under a sponsor's exemption; his management company, Sportfive, ran the tournament. The PGA Tour allows up to seven sponsor's exemptions per year. He went to PGA Tour Qualifying school in late 2025. On the Korn Ferry Tour he had two top-10 finishes including a runner-up finish at the Veritex Bank Championship. In 2025, his first full season as a professional, Brown finished 68th on the Korn Ferry Tour's points list, including four top 25s in 14 starts, thus achieving full status for the 2026 Korn Ferry season. Only the top 75 players were granted fully exempt status for 2026.

At The American Express on the PGA Tour in January 2026, Brown shot a second round 60 to set a new course record for the Nicklaus Tournament course at PGA West. He missed a 7 footer for birdie on the 18th hole to just miss shooting a 59. Brown's performance in tying for 14th in the CJ Cup Byron Nelson in May 2026, earned him 55 non-member FedEx Cup points, enough to surpass the threshold for Special Temporary Membership on the PGA Tour, allowing him to accept unlimited sponsor's exemptions for the remainder of the season.

While spending the rest of 2026 split between the Korn Ferry Tour and the PGA Tour, Brown earned his PGA Tour card for the 2027 season after finishing ninth on the Korn Ferry Tour points list. A couple weeks afterwards, while competing on the PGA Tour as a special temporary member, Brown won the World Wide Technology Championship on November 8, 2026, defeating Ben James with a birdie on the second playoff hole to claim his first PGA Tour victory.

== Amateur wins ==
- 2023 AJGA Junior at Canebrake, Huntsville.org Junior Championship, Wyndham Invitational, Tennessee Junior Amateur, The Elite Invitational

== Professional wins (1) ==
=== PGA Tour wins (1) ===
No.	Date	Tournament	Winning score	Margin of victory	Runner-up
1	Nov 8, 2026	World Wide Technology Championship	−23 (66-68-68-63=265)	Playoff	(United States) Ben James

PGA Tour playoff record (1–0)

No.	Year	Tournament	Opponent	Result
1	2026	World Wide Technology Championship	(United States) Ben James	Won with birdie on second extra hole

== U.S. national team appearances ==
- Junior Presidents Cup: 2024 (winners)

== See also ==
- 2026 Korn Ferry Tour graduates
