= Bård Skogen =

Norwegian professional golfer (born 2001)

Personal information
- Full name: Bård Bjørnevik Skogen
- Nationality: Norway
- Born: 4 September 2001 (age 25) Sveio, Norway

Career
- Sport: Golf
- College: Texas Tech University
- Turned professional: 2024
- Current tour: Challenge Tour

Best results in major championships
- Masters Tournament: DNP
- PGA Championship: DNP
- U.S. Open: DNP
- The Open Championship: CUT: 2026

Achievements and awards
- Garmin Norgescup Order of Merit winner: 2018
- Srixon Tour Order of Merit winner: 2019

Bård Bjørnevik Skogen (born 4 September 2001) is a Norwegian professional golfer.

== Amateur career ==
Skogen had a successful amateur career. He won the 2017 European Young Masters and spent five years on the national team. He represented Europe in the 2017 Asia Pacific Junior Championship in Hong Kong, placing 4th, and helped win the 2019 Jacques Léglise Trophy. He represented Norway at the 2018 Summer Youth Olympics in Buenos Aires alongside Emilie Øverås, where they finished 12th.

In 2019, he performed well at Europe's leading amateur events. He finished 4th at the Portuguese International Amateur Championship, 3rd at the French International Boys Championship (Trophee Carlhian) and top-10 at both the Spanish International Amateur Championship and the Boys Amateur Championship. In 2021, he was runner-up and leading amateur at the Norwegian National Golf Championship, behind Andreas Halvorsen.

Skogen was educated at Wang Toppidrett Oslo. He attended Texas Tech University between 2020 and 2024 and played with the Texas Tech Red Raiders golf team. As a senior, he won the NCAA Baton Rouge Regional and was an Honorable Mention All-American.

== Professional career ==
Skogen turned professional after the 2024 European Amateur and played in a few Nordic Golf League events, placing top-4 in his first two starts. He earned a Challenge Tour card at Q-School.

Skogen made his Challenge Tour debut at the 2025 SDC Open in South Africa, where he held the final overnight co-lead and ultimately finished 5th. A few months later, he tied for 3rd at the Swiss Challenge, a stroke behind winner Félix Mory. He ended his rookie season 33rd in the season rankings.

Skogen earned a place for the 2026 Open Championship with rounds of 68 and 64 to become co-medalist in the qualifier at Royal Cinque Ports. Only the third Norwegian golfer to qualify for the Open this century, he shot rounds of 73 and 71 at Royal Birkdale for a score of 144, same as his compatriot Viktor Hovland.

== Amateur wins ==
- 2017 Srixon Tour 4, European Young Masters
- 2018 Srixon Tour 1, Garmin Norgescup 3, Garmin Norgescup 6, Srixon Tour 8 Finale
- 2019 Srixon Tour 2, Srixon Tour 3 Match, Srixon Tour 8 Finale
- 2023 The Big Texan
- 2024 NCAA Baton Rouge Regional

== Team appearances ==
Amateur

- European Boys' Team Championship (representing Norway): 2017, 2018, 2019
- European Nations Cup – Copa Sotogrande (representing Norway): 2018, 2019
- Youth Olympic Games (representing Norway): 2018
- Jacques Léglise Trophy (representing continental Europe): 2019 (winners)
- Spirit International Amateur (representing Norway): 2021
