= Luke Clanton =

American professional golfer (born 2003)

Personal information
- Nationality: United States
- Born: November 5, 2003 (age 22) Hialeah, Florida, U.S.

Career
- Sport: Golf
- College: Florida State University
- Turned professional: 2025
- Current tour: PGA Tour
- Highest ranking: 87 (December 29, 2024) (as of October 25, 2026)

Best results in major championships
- Masters Tournament: DNP
- PGA Championship: DNP
- U.S. Open: T41: 2024
- The Open Championship: DNP

Achievements and awards
- Mark H. McCormack Medal: 2024
- Ben Hogan Award: 2025

Luke Clanton (born November 5, 2003) is an American professional golfer. He rose to world number one in the World Amateur Golf Ranking in August 2024.

== Amateur career ==
While at American Heritage High School, Clanton won the Florida High School State Championship on three occasions, in 2019, 2021 and 2022. He also won several other prestigious tournaments, including the Azalea Invitational, and the North and South Amateur at Pinehurst.

In the fall of 2022, Clanton enrolled at Florida State University. In his sophomore year, he rose to number one in the World Amateur Golf Ranking after winning three amateur titles – the Seminole Intercollegiate, the Valspar Collegiate, and the Lewis Chitengwa Memorial – and performing well in several professional tournaments.

In June 2024, Clanton competed in the 2024 U.S. Open at Pinehurst, having come through final qualifying at The Bear's Club in Florida, finishing T-41. The following month, he became the first amateur since 1958 to finish in the top-10 in back-to-back PGA Tour events, finishing in a tie for 10th at the Rocket Mortgage Classic and as joint runner-up in the John Deere Classic. He had two more top-ten finishes on the PGA Tour later in the year, with a 5th place at the Wyndham Championship and another runner-up finish at the RSM Classic, which put him inside the top-100 of the Official World Golf Ranking. At the end of the year, he was awarded the Mark H. McCormack Medal as the world's top amateur golfer.

In February 2025, Clanton made the cut at the Cognizant Classic to secure the final points he needed to earn PGA Tour membership via the PGA Tour University Accelerated program. He did not turn professional immediately.

== Professional career ==
Clanton turned professional in June 2025 after the NCAA Golf Championship and made his pro debut at the RBC Canadian Open.

== Amateur wins ==
- 2017 South Florida Junior Open, AJGA Junior at Blue Hill
- 2020 Arnold Palmer Invitational Junior
- 2022 Azalea Invitational, North and South Amateur, South Beach International Amateur
- 2023 NCAA Morgan Hill Regional
- 2024 Seminole Intercollegiate, Valspar Collegiate, Lewis Chitengwa Memorial
- 2025 Watersound Invitational, Seminole Intercollegiate, Lewis Chitengwa Memorial, NCAA Tallahassee Regional

== Results in major championships ==
Tournament	2024
Masters Tournament	
PGA Championship	
U.S. Open	T41
The Open Championship	

Did not play

"T" = tied
