= World Wide Technology Championship =

Professional golf tournament in Mexico

Coordinates: 20.6895°N 87.0312°W

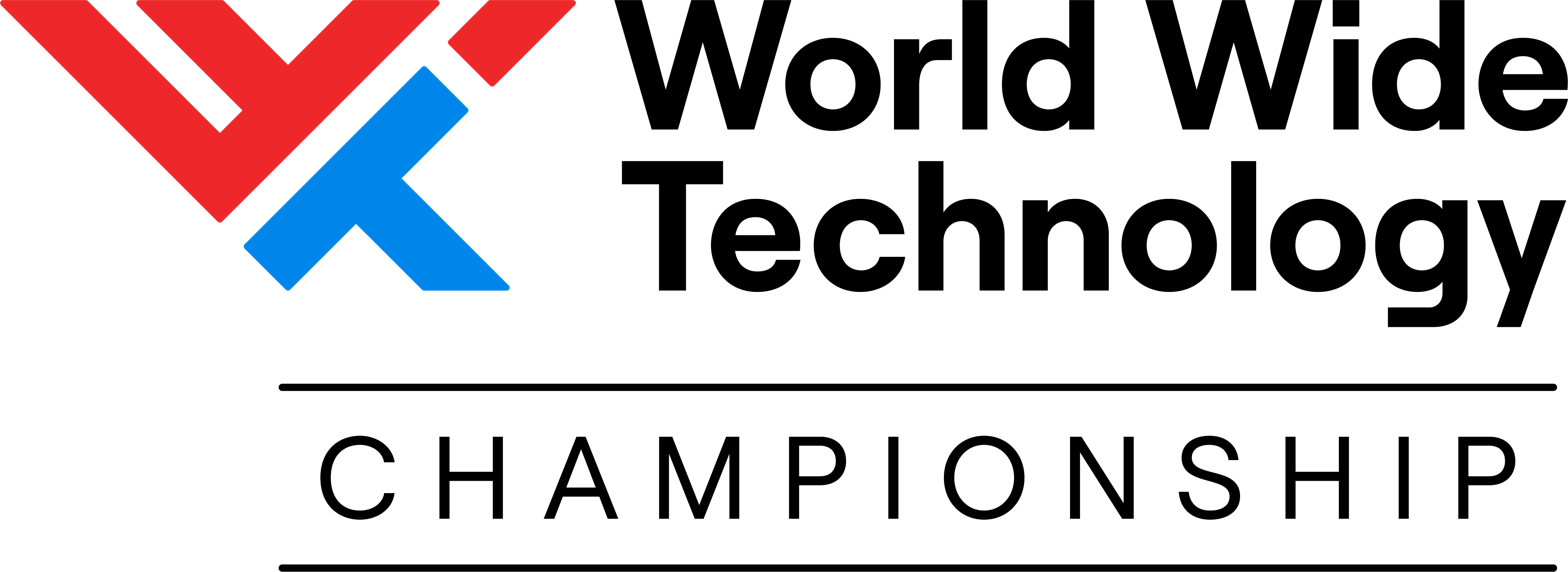

Tournament information
- Location: Los Cabos, Baja California Sur, Mexico
- Established: 2007
- Course: El Cardonal
- Par: 72
- Length: 7,363 yards (6,733 m)
- Tour: PGA Tour
- Format: Stroke play
- Prize fund: US$6,000,000
- Month played: November
- Website: wwtchampionship.com

Tournament record score
- Aggregate: 259 Ben Griffin (2025)
- To par: −29 as above

Current champion
- (United States) Blades Brown

Location map
- Location in Mexico Location in Baja California Sur

The World Wide Technology Championship is a professional golf tournament on the PGA Tour in Mexico, contested at the Tiger Woods-designed El Cardonal golf course within the Diamante Cabo San Lucas resort. It debuted in February 2007 and was the first PGA Tour event to take place in Mexico. The first 16 years of the tournament took place in Riviera Maya before the tournament was moved to Los Cabos in 2023.

== History ==
Originally an alternate event in late winter, the tournament was played the same week as the WGC Match Play event in Arizona. Mayakoba was part of the FedEx Cup, but only earned half the points of a regular event. The prize fund in 2007 was US$3.5 million (with a winner's share of $630,000), making it the richest golf tournament in Mexico.

Fred Funk, a winner four months earlier on the Champions Tour, took the inaugural event in a playoff over José Cóceres of Argentina. Funk was 50 years, 257 days of age and became the oldest player to win a PGA Tour event in nearly 32 years; Art Wall was about eleven months older when he won the Greater Milwaukee Open in July 1975.

In 2013, the event was moved to mid-November to be part of the 2014 season as a primary event in the early part of the season, which began in October for the first time. The tournament now offered full FedEx Cup points, a Masters invitation, and a large purse increase (over 60%, to $6 million). With the tour's new schedule, the Mayakoba event was not part of the abbreviated 2013 season.

The Golf Classic is allocated four additional sponsor exemptions designated for players of Spanish or Mexican heritage from Latin America, South America, Spain, or Mexico.

In 2021, World Wide Technology was announced as the new title sponsor of the event, in a deal lasting until 2027.

In November 2022, it was noted that the El Camaleón Golf Course had been added to the roster for the 2023 LIV Golf League. With the PGA Tour and LIV Golf's ongoing legal battle, the tour decided to end its relationship with Mayakoba. In January 2023, PGA Tour commissioner Jay Monahan confirmed that the tour was working with World Wide Technology, but did not see them being back at Mayakoba.

== Winners ==
Year	Winner	Score	To par	Margin of victory	Runner(s)-up	Purse ($)	Winner's share ($)
World Wide Technology Championship
2026	(United States) Blades Brown	265	−23	Playoff	(United States) Ben James	6,000,000	1,080,000
2025	(United States) Ben Griffin	259	−29	2 strokes	(United States) Chad Ramey (Finland) Sami Välimäki	6,000,000	1,080,000
2024	(United States) Austin Eckroat	264	−24	1 stroke	(United States) Justin Lower (United States) Carson Young	7,200,000	1,296,000
2023	(South Africa) Erik van Rooyen	261	−27	2 strokes	(United States) Matt Kuchar (Colombia) Camilo Villegas	8,200,000	1,476,000
2022	(United States) Russell Henley	261	−23	4 strokes	(United States) Brian Harman	8,200,000	1,476,000
2021	(Norway) Viktor Hovland (2)	261	−23	4 strokes	(Mexico) Carlos Ortiz	7,200,000	1,296,000
Mayakoba Golf Classic
2020	(Norway) Viktor Hovland	264	−20	1 stroke	(United States) Aaron Wise	7,200,000	1,296,000
2019	(United States) Brendon Todd	264	−20	1 stroke	(United States) Adam Long (Mexico) Carlos Ortiz (United States) Vaughn Taylor	7,200,000	1,296,000
2018	(United States) Matt Kuchar	262	−22	1 stroke	(New Zealand) Danny Lee	7,200,000	1,296,000
OHL Classic at Mayakoba
2017	(United States) Patton Kizzire	265	−19	1 stroke	(United States) Rickie Fowler	7,100,000	1,278,000
2016	(United States) Pat Perez	263	−21	2 strokes	(United States) Gary Woodland	7,000,000	1,260,000
2015	(Northern Ireland) Graeme McDowell	266	−18	Playoff	(United States) Jason Bohn (Scotland) Russell Knox	6,200,000	1,116,000
2014	(United States) Charley Hoffman	267	−17	1 stroke	(United States) Shawn Stefani	6,100,000	1,098,000
2013	(United States) Harris English	263	−21	4 strokes	(United States) Brian Stuard	6,000,000	1,080,000
Mayakoba Golf Classic
2012	(United States) John Huh	271	−13	Playoff	(Australia) Robert Allenby	3,700,000	666,000
2011	(United States) Johnson Wagner	267	−17	Playoff	(United States) Spencer Levin	3,700,000	666,000
2010	(United States) Cameron Beckman	269	−15	2 strokes	(United States) Joe Durant (United States) Brian Stuard	3,600,000	648,000
2009	(United States) Mark Wilson	267	−13	2 strokes	(United States) J. J. Henry	3,600,000	648,000
2008	(United States) Brian Gay	264	−16	2 strokes	(United States) Steve Marino	3,500,000	630,000
2007	(United States) Fred Funk	266	−14	Playoff	(Argentina) José Cóceres	3,500,000	630,000

Note: Green highlight indicates scoring records.
