= 2024 U.S. Open (golf) =

124th U.S. Open

Tournament information
- Dates: June 13–16, 2024
- Location: Pinehurst, North Carolina; 35.1895°N 79.4678°W
- Courses: Pinehurst Resort, Course No. 2
- Organized by: USGA
- Tours: PGA Tour; European Tour; Japan Golf Tour

Statistics
- Par: 70
- Length: 7,548 yards (6,902 m)
- Field: 156 players, 74 after cut
- Cut: 145 (+5)
- Prize fund: $21,500,000
- Winner's share: $4,300,000

Champion
- (United States) Bryson DeChambeau
- 274 (−6)
- Location in the United States Location in North Carolina

The 2024 United States Open Championship was the 124th U.S. Open, the national open golf championship of the United States. It was a 72-hole stroke play tournament played from June 13–16 on course number 2 of Pinehurst Resort in Pinehurst, North Carolina. It is the 1,000th USGA staged championship in the organization's history. Bryson DeChambeau won the tournament to claim his second U.S. Open title.

== Course layout ==
Course No. 2

Hole	Yards	Par	Hole	Yards	Par
1	395	4	10	617	5
2	504	4	11	482	4
3	387	4	12	486	4
4	528	4	13	381	4
5	588	5	14	472	4
6	228	3	15	197	3
7	426	4	16	530	4
8	488	4	17	207	3
9	184	3	18	448	4
Out	3,728	35	In	3,820	35
Source:		Total		7,548	70

Yardage by round

Round	Hole	1	2	3	4	5	6	7	8	9	Out	10	11	12	13	14	15	16	17	18	In	Total
1st	Yards	400	508	389	528	582	230	436	486	186	3,745	619	479	489	384	476	206	523	213	435	3,824	7.569
2nd	Yards	391	503	382	523	596	222	426	494	194	3,731	621	490	475	378	472	172	531	199	450	3,788	7,519
3rd	Yards	404	514	316	527	583	237	417	496	167	3,661	630	480	490	368	461	196	528	180	432	3,765	7,426
Final	Yards	395	506	386	542	587	197	433	513	177	3,736	619	491	478	316	483	205	540	220	449	3,801	7,537

== Field ==
The field for the U.S. Open was made up of players who gain entry through qualifying events and those who are exempt from qualifying. The exemption criteria include provisions for recent major champions, winners of major amateur events, and leading players in the world rankings. Qualifying was in two stages, local and final, with some players being exempted through to final qualifying.

=== Exemptions ===
This list details the exemption criteria for the 2024 U.S. Open and the players who qualified under them; any additional criteria under which players were exempt is indicated in parentheses. (Note: (a) – denotes amateur.)

1. Recent winners of the U.S. Open (2014–2023)

- Wyndham Clark (2,11,21)
- Bryson DeChambeau (21)
- Matt Fitzpatrick (11,21)
- Dustin Johnson (2,6)
- Martin Kaymer
- Brooks Koepka (7,21)
- Jordan Spieth (11,21)
- Gary Woodland
- Jon Rahm (2,6,11,21) did not play due to an injury.

2. The leading 10 players, and those tying for 10th place, in the 2023 U.S. Open

- Austin Eckroat (21)
- Harris English (21)
- Tommy Fleetwood (11,21)
- Rickie Fowler (11,21)
- Tom Kim (11,21)
- Min Woo Lee (21)
- Rory McIlroy (11,12,21)
- Xander Schauffele (7,11,21)
- Scottie Scheffler (6,9,11,12,21)
- Cameron Smith (8,9)

3. The winner of the 2023 U.S. Senior Open

- Bernhard Langer did not play.

4. The winner of the 2023 U.S. Amateur

- Nick Dunlap

5. Winners of the 2023 U.S. Junior Amateur and U.S. Mid-Amateur, and the runner-up in the 2023 U.S. Amateur (Note: Players qualifying in this category must remain an amateur through the conclusion of the U.S. Open.)

- Stewart Hagestad (a)
- Bryan Kim (a)
- Neal Shipley (a)

6. Recent winners of the Masters Tournament (2020–2024)

- Hideki Matsuyama (21)

7. Recent winners of the PGA Championship (2019–2024)

- Phil Mickelson
- Collin Morikawa (8,11,21)
- Justin Thomas (21)

8. Recent winners of The Open Championship (2019–2023)

- Brian Harman (11,21)
- Shane Lowry (21)

9. Recent winners of The Players Championship (2022–2024)

10. The winner of the 2023 BMW PGA Championship

- Ryan Fox

11. All players who qualified and were eligible for the 2023 Tour Championship

- Keegan Bradley (21)
- Sam Burns (21)
- Patrick Cantlay (21)
- Corey Conners (21)
- Jason Day (21)
- Tony Finau (21)
- Lucas Glover (12,21)
- Emiliano Grillo (21)
- Tyrrell Hatton (21)
- Russell Henley (21)
- Max Homa (21)
- Viktor Hovland (12,21)
- Im Sung-jae (21)
- Kim Si-woo (21)
- Taylor Moore (21)
- Adam Schenk (21)
- Sepp Straka (21)
- Nick Taylor (21)

12. Winners of multiple PGA Tour events (Note: Events must carry full-point allocation towards the FedEx Cup.) from the 2023 U.S. Open to the start of the 2024 tournament

13. The top 5 players in the FedEx Cup standings as of May 20 who are not yet exempt

- Billy Horschel
- Mackenzie Hughes
- Peter Malnati
- Taylor Pendrith
- Erik van Rooyen

14. The top player on the 2023 Korn Ferry Tour points list

- Ben Kohles

15. The top 2 players on the 2023 Race to Dubai who are not yet exempt as of May 20

- Adrian Meronk
- Victor Perez

16. The top player on the 2024 Race to Dubai as of May 20 who is not yet exempt

- Rikuya Hoshino

17. The winner of the 2023 Amateur Championship

- Christo Lamprecht forfeited his exemption by turning professional.

18. The winner of the Mark H. McCormack Medal in 2023

- Gordon Sargent (a)

19. The individual winner of the 2024 NCAA Division I Men's Golf Championship

- Hiroshi Tai (a)

20. The winner of the 2024 Latin America Amateur Championship

- Santiago de la Fuente (a)

21. The leading 60 players on the Official World Golf Ranking as of May 20

- Ludvig Åberg
- An Byeong-hun
- Christiaan Bezuidenhout
- Akshay Bhatia
- Eric Cole
- Thomas Detry
- Adam Hadwin
- Tom Hoge
- Nicolai Højgaard
- Stephan Jäger
- Chris Kirk
- Kurt Kitayama
- Jake Knapp
- Denny McCarthy
- Alex Norén
- Matthieu Pavon
- J. T. Poston
- Justin Rose
- Sahith Theegala
- Cameron Young
- Will Zalatoris

22. The leading 60 players on the Official World Golf Ranking if not otherwise exempt as of June 10

- Robert MacIntyre
- Adam Scott (Note: Scott was 61st when added on June 10 under the Payne Stewart rule. Following the death of Grayson Murray on May 25, the 61st place golfer in the rankings was elevated.)

23. Special exemptions

- Tiger Woods

=== Qualifiers ===
Date	Location	Venue	Field	Spots	Qualifiers (Note: (L) – denotes a player who progressed through local qualifying.)
May 20	Surrey, England	Walton Heath Golf Club	102	9	Sam Bairstow, Grant Forrest, Matteo Manassero, Richard Mansell, Tom McKibbin, Edoardo Molinari, Brandon Robinson-Thompson, Robert Rock, Jason Scrivener
May 20	Hino, Japan	Hino Golf Club	34	3	Ryo Ishikawa, Riki Kawamoto, Taisei Shimizu
May 20	Dallas, Texas	Dallas Athletic Club (Gold and Blue courses)	138	11	Parker Bell (a), Eugenio Chacarra, Nico Echavarría, Takumi Kanaya, Kang Sung-hoon, Kim Seong-hyeon, Logan McAllister, Michael McGowan (L), Mac Meissner, Francesco Molinari, Brandon Wu
Jun 3	Ridgeway, Ontario, Canada	Cherry Hill Club	65	7	Rico Hoey, Mark Hubbard, Ashton McCulloch (a), Aaron Rai, Greyson Sigg, Adam Svensson, Davis Thompson
Jun 3	Daly City, California	Lake Merced Golf Club	84	4	John Chin (L), Omar Morales (a), David Puig, Charlie Reiter (L)
Jun 3	Jupiter, Florida	The Bear's Club	73	5	Daniel Berger, Dean Burmester, Luke Clanton (a), Matt Kuchar, Willie Mack III (L)
Jun 3	Alpharetta, Georgia	The Golf Club of Georgia	68	3	Jackson Buchanan (a), Frederik Kjettrup (L), Chris Petefish
Jun 3	Rockville, Maryland	Woodmont Country Club	64	3	Isaiah Salinda, Tim Widing, Wells Williams (a)
Jun 3	Summit, New Jersey	Canoe Brook Country Club (North and South courses)	72	4	Max Greyserman, Jim Herman, Ben James (a), Andrew Svoboda
Jun 3	Durham, North Carolina	Duke University Golf Club	84	7	Sam Bennett, Brian Campbell, Frankie Capan III, Chesson Hadley, Harry Higgs, Carter Jenkins, Webb Simpson
Jun 3	Columbus, Ohio	Ohio State University Golf Club	68	5	Gunnar Broin (a,L), Justin Lower, Chris Naegel (L), Séamus Power, Brendon Todd
Jun 3	Springfield, Ohio	Springfield Country Club	64	4	Zac Blair, Cameron Davis, Beau Hossler, Carson Schaake (L)
Jun 3	Bend, Oregon	Pronghorn Resort	44	2	Colin Prater (a,L), Joey Vrzich (L)

==== Alternates who gained entry ====
The following players gained a place in the field having finished as the leading alternates in the specified final qualifying events:

- Casey Jarvis (England) (Note: Added to field the week prior to the tournament.)
- Sergio García (Texas) (Note: Claimed spot held for category 22.)
- Brendan Valdes (a) (Florida)
- Otto Black (L) (Columbus, Ohio)
- Maxwell Moldovan (Springfield, Ohio)
- Jackson Suber (Maryland) (Note: Suber replaced Jon Rahm.)

== Round summaries ==
=== First round ===
Thursday, June 13, 2024

Patrick Cantlay shot 65 in the morning wave to set the first-round lead. Playing in the afternoon wave, 2011 champion Rory McIlroy birdied his final hole to cap a bogey-free 65 and match Cantlay's mark. The scoring average for the field was 73.26, near identical to the 73.23 first-round scoring average when Pinehurst No. 2 last hosted the U.S. Open in 2014.

Place	Player	Score	To par
T1	(United States) Patrick Cantlay	65	−5
T1	(Northern Ireland) Rory McIlroy	65	−5
3	(Sweden) Ludvig Åberg	66	−4
T4	(United States) Bryson DeChambeau	67	−3
T4	(France) Matthieu Pavon	67	−3
T6	(United States) Akshay Bhatia	68	−2
T6	(United States) Tony Finau	68	−2
T6	(England) Tyrrell Hatton	68	−2
T9	(United States) Sam Bennett	69	−1
T9	(Canada) Corey Conners	69	−1
T9	(Belgium) Thomas Detry	69	−1
T9	(Spain) Sergio García	69	−1
T9	(South Korea) Kim Seong-hyeon	69	−1
T9	(England) Aaron Rai	69	−1
T9	(United States) Jackson Suber	69	−1

=== Second round ===
Friday, June 14, 2024

Making his debut at the U.S. Open, Ludvig Åberg took the solo lead headed into the weekend following a 1-under 69. The cut came at 145 (5-over-par). Notable players to miss the cut included world number five Viktor Hovland, world number ten Max Homa, and three-time U.S. Open champion Tiger Woods. World number one and pre-tournament favorite Scottie Scheffler narrowly made the cut and was 10 strokes off the lead. Standing two shots outside the cutline after 35 holes, Francesco Molinari made a hole in one on the par-3 9th to make the cut on the number.

Place	Player	Score	To par
1	(Sweden) Ludvig Åberg	66-69=135	−5
T2	(United States) Patrick Cantlay	65-71=136	−4
T2	(United States) Bryson DeChambeau	67-69=136	−4
T2	(Belgium) Thomas Detry	69-67=136	−4
T5	(United States) Tony Finau	68-69=137	−3
T5	(Northern Ireland) Rory McIlroy	65-72=137	−3
T5	(France) Matthieu Pavon	67-70=137	−3
8	(Japan) Hideki Matsuyama	72-66=138	−2
T9	(United States) Akshay Bhatia	68-71=139	−1
T9	(United States) Zac Blair	70-69=139	−1
T9	(Canada) Corey Conners	69-70=139	−1
T9	(England) Tyrrell Hatton	68-71=139	−1
T9	(South Korea) Tom Kim	71-68=139	−1
T9	(United States) Xander Schauffele	70-69=139	−1
T9	(Sweden) Tim Widing	71-68=139	−1

=== Third round ===
Saturday, June 15, 2024

Bryson DeChambeau, 2020 champion, shot a 67 to establish the first 54-hole lead of his career in a major. Rory McIlroy moved into a three-way tie for second as he chased his first major championship victory since 2014, three shots behind of DeChambeau. Beginning in a tie for 51st, Collin Morikawa had the lowest round of the day with a bogey-free 66 to end in a tie for 9th. The scoring average for the field was 73.18, more than three strokes over par.

Place	Player	Score	To par
1	(United States) Bryson DeChambeau	67-69-67=203	−7
T2	(United States) Patrick Cantlay	65-71-70=206	−4
T2	(Northern Ireland) Rory McIlroy	65-72-69=206	−4
T2	(France) Matthieu Pavon	67-70-69=206	−4
T5	(Sweden) Ludvig Åberg	66-69-73=208	−2
T5	(Japan) Hideki Matsuyama	72-66-70=208	−2
T7	(United States) Tony Finau	68-69-72=209	−1
T7	(England) Tyrrell Hatton	68-71-70=209	−1
T9	(Canada) Corey Conners	69-70-71=210	E
T9	(South Korea) Tom Kim	71-68-71=210	E
T9	(United States) Collin Morikawa	70-74-66=210	E

=== Final round ===
Sunday, June 16, 2024

==== Summary ====
Bryson DeChambeau got up and down from 50 yards out of a bunker on the final hole to save par and win his second U.S. Open title, one stroke ahead of Rory McIlroy. McIlroy had the solo lead at 8-under with four holes remaining, but made three bogeys on the final stretch, including missing a two-foot par putt on 16 and a three-foot par putt on 18.

==== Final leaderboard ====
Champion
Silver Cup winner (leading amateur)
(a) = amateur
(c) = past champion

Place	Player	Score	To par	Money ($)
1	(United States) Bryson DeChambeau (c)	67-69-67-71=274	−6	4,300,000
2	(Northern Ireland) Rory McIlroy (c)	65-72-69-69=275	−5	2,322,000
T3	(United States) Patrick Cantlay	65-71-70-70=276	−4	1,229,051
T3	(United States) Tony Finau	68-69-72-67=276	−4	1,229,051
5	(France) Matthieu Pavon	67-70-69-71=277	−3	843,765
6	(Japan) Hideki Matsuyama	72-66-70-70=278	−2	748,154
T7	(United States) Russell Henley	70-70-72-67=279	−1	639,289
T7	(United States) Xander Schauffele	70-69-72-68=279	−1	639,289
T9	(United States) Sam Burns	73-67-73-67=280	E	502,391
T9	(Canada) Corey Conners	69-70-71-70=280	E	502,391
T9	(United States) Davis Thompson	70-72-70-68=280	E	502,391

Leaderboard below the top 10
Place	Player	Score	To par	Money ($)
T12	(Sweden) Ludvig Åberg	66-69-73-73=281	+1	409,279
T12	(Spain) Sergio García	69-71-71-70=281	+1	409,279
T14	(Belgium) Thomas Detry	69-67-76-70=282	+2	351,370
T14	(United States) Collin Morikawa	70-74-66-72=282	+2	351,370
T16	(United States) Akshay Bhatia	68-71-73-71=283	+3	299,218
T16	(England) Tommy Fleetwood	70-75-70-68=283	+3	299,218
T16	(Canada) Taylor Pendrith	71-70-70-72=283	+3	299,218
T19	(Republic of Ireland) Shane Lowry	74-71-70-69=284	+4	255,759
T19	(England) Aaron Rai	69-74-68-73=284	+4	255,759
T21	(United States) Daniel Berger	73-70-73-69=285	+5	203,607
T21	(United States) Max Greyserman	71-74-72-68=285	+5	203,607
T21	(United States) Brian Harman	71-71-71-72=285	+5	203,607
T21	(Germany) Stephan Jäger	70-70-73-72=285	+5	203,607
T21	(Australia) Min Woo Lee	73-69-72-71=285	+5	203,607
T26	(United States) Zac Blair	70-69-75-72=286	+6	153,281
T26	(England) Tyrrell Hatton	68-71-70-77=286	+6	153,281
T26	(South Korea) Tom Kim	71-68-71-76=286	+6	153,281
T26	(United States) Chris Kirk	71-71-72-72=286	+6	153,281
T26	(United States) Brooks Koepka (c)	70-75-71-70=286	+6	153,281
T26	(United States) Neal Shipley (a)	70-73-71-72=286	+6	0 (Note: By USGA rule, players are allowed to accept $3,000 in travel and tournament expenses and $1,000 in cash.)
T32	(South Africa) Christiaan Bezuidenhout	72-71-72-72=287	+7	110,894
T32	(United States) Keegan Bradley	74-70-72-71=287	+7	110,894
T32	(South Korea) Kim Si-woo	71-72-74-70=287	+7	110,894
T32	(United States) Denny McCarthy	75-67-72-73=287	+7	110,894
T32	(United States) J. T. Poston	73-71-71-72=287	+7	110,894
T32	(United States) Isaiah Salinda	70-72-73-72=287	+7	110,894
T32	(Australia) Adam Scott	70-72-76-69=287	+7	110,894
T32	(Australia) Cameron Smith	71-72-72-72=287	+7	110,894
T32	(United States) Sahith Theegala	77-68-72-70=287	+7	110,894
T41	(United States) Frankie Capan III	71-70-76-71=288	+8	72,305
T41	(United States) Luke Clanton (a)	76-69-69-74=288	+8	0
T41	(United States) Harris English	70-73-74-71=288	+8	76,542
T41	(Argentina) Emiliano Grillo	70-72-73-73=288	+8	76,542
T41	(United States) Billy Horschel	73-67-74-74=288	+8	76,542
T41	(Northern Ireland) Tom McKibbin	74-71-71-72=288	+8	76,542
T41	(United States) Scottie Scheffler	71-74-71-72=288	+8	76,542
T41	(United States) Jordan Spieth (c)	72-71-74-71=288	+8	76,542
T41	(Sweden) Tim Widing	71-68-76-73=288	+8	76,542
T50	(Denmark) Nicolai Højgaard	72-69-74-74=289	+9	51,065
T50	(United States) Mark Hubbard	74-69-70-76=289	+9	51,065
T50	(United States) Matt Kuchar	72-71-75-71=289	+9	51,065
T50	(United States) Justin Lower	72-73-74-70=289	+9	51,065
54	(Colombia) Nico Echavarría	72-69-78-71=290	+10	47,370
55	(Spain) David Puig	76-68-69-78=291	+11	46,501
T56	(United States) Brian Campbell	73-70-75-74=292	+12	44,546
T56	(United States) Wyndham Clark (c)	73-71-71-77=292	+12	44,546
T56	(New Zealand) Ryan Fox	73-72-76-71=292	+12	44,546
T56	(South Korea) Kim Seong-hyeon	69-72-83-68=292	+12	44,546
T56	(United States) Ben Kohles	77-68-76-71=292	+12	44,546
T56	(United States) Greyson Sigg	76-69-75-72=292	+12	44,546
T56	(Austria) Sepp Straka	70-72-78-72=292	+12	44,546
T56	(Canada) Adam Svensson	73-70-74-75=292	+12	44,546
T64	(England) Matt Fitzpatrick (c)	73-72-79-69=293	+13	42,155
T64	(Germany) Martin Kaymer (c)	70-73-77-73=293	+13	42,155
T64	(Italy) Francesco Molinari	73-72-77-71=293	+13	42,155
T67	(United States) Brendon Todd	74-71-74-75=294	+14	41,069
T67	(United States) Cameron Young	73-72-75-74=294	+14	41,069
69	(South Africa) Dean Burmester	74-71-76-74=295	+15	40,417
T70	(United States) Gunnar Broin (a)	75-68-81-72=296	+16	0
T70	(United States) Brandon Wu	74-71-78-73=296	+16	39,982
72	(United States) Sam Bennett	69-72-77-79=297	+17	39,548
73	(United States) Jackson Suber	69-73-81-75=298	+18	39,113
74	(United States) Austin Eckroat	72-72-78-78=300	+20	38,670
CUT	(United States) Jackson Buchanan (a)	76-70=146	+6	0
CUT	(United States) Eric Cole	73-73=146	+6	10,000
CUT	(United States) Nick Dunlap	73-73=146	+6	10,000
CUT	(United States) Max Homa	71-75=146	+6	10,000
CUT	(Norway) Viktor Hovland	78-68=146	+6	10,000
CUT	(United States) Ben James (a)	75-71=146	+6	0
CUT	(United States) Bryan Kim (a)	72-74=146	+6	0
CUT	(Denmark) Frederik Kjettrup	72-74=146	+6	10,000
CUT	(Scotland) Robert MacIntyre	70-76=146	+6	10,000
CUT	(England) Brandon Robinson-Thompson	72-74=146	+6	10,000
CUT	(England) Justin Rose (c)	73-73=146	+6	10,000
CUT	(Australia) Jason Scrivener	74-72=146	+6	10,000
CUT	(Japan) Taisei Shimizu	71-75=146	+6	10,000
CUT	(United States) Parker Bell (a)	77-70=147	+7	0
CUT	(Canada) Adam Hadwin	74-73=147	+7	10,000
CUT	(Philippines) Rico Hoey	77-70=147	+7	10,000
CUT	(United States) Kurt Kitayama	73-74=147	+7	10,000
CUT	(United States) Peter Malnati	74-73=147	+7	10,000
CUT	(Mexico) Omar Morales (a)	73-74=147	+7	0
CUT	(Republic of Ireland) Séamus Power	71-76=147	+7	10,000
CUT	(United States) Tiger Woods (c)	74-73=147	+7	10,000
CUT	(Spain) Eugenio Chacarra	75-73=148	+8	10,000
CUT	(Australia) Jason Day	71-77=148	+8	10,000
CUT	(United States) Rickie Fowler	71-77=148	+8	10,000
CUT	(United States) Chesson Hadley	75-73=148	+8	10,000
CUT	(United States) Tom Hoge	75-73=148	+8	10,000
CUT	(Japan) Ryo Ishikawa	76-72=148	+8	10,000
CUT	(England) Richard Mansell	78-70=148	+8	10,000
CUT	(United States) Taylor Moore	76-72=148	+8	10,000
CUT	(Sweden) Alex Norén	73-75=148	+8	10,000
CUT	(South Africa) Erik van Rooyen	76-72=148	+8	10,000
CUT	(United States) Webb Simpson (c)	75-73=148	+8	10,000
CUT	(Canada) Nick Taylor	74-74=148	+8	10,000
CUT	(United States) Will Zalatoris	75-73=148	+8	10,000
CUT	(Australia) Cameron Davis	77-72=149	+9	10,000
CUT	(United States) Dustin Johnson (c)	74-75=149	+9	10,000
CUT	(South Korea) Kang Sung-hoon	74-75=149	+9	10,000
CUT	(United States) Logan McAllister	70-79=149	+9	10,000
CUT	(United States) Mac Meissner	72-77=149	+9	10,000
CUT	(Italy) Edoardo Molinari	72-77=149	+9	10,000
CUT	(France) Victor Perez	75-74=149	+9	10,000
CUT	(United States) Chris Petefish	77-72=149	+9	10,000
CUT	(England) Robert Rock	70-79=149	+9	10,000
CUT	(Singapore) Hiroshi Tai (a)	75-74=149	+9	0
CUT	(United States) Joey Vrzich	76-73=149	+9	10,000
CUT	(United States) Beau Hossler	74-76=150	+10	10,000
CUT	(South Korea) Im Sung-jae	74-76=150	+10	10,000
CUT	(Japan) Takumi Kanaya	76-74=150	+10	10,000
CUT	(Canada) Ashton McCulloch (a)	75-75=150	+10	0
CUT	(United States) Gary Woodland (c)	72-78=150	+10	10,000
CUT	(England) Sam Bairstow	84-67=151	+11	10,000
CUT	(United States) Harry Higgs	76-75=151	+11	10,000
CUT	(South Africa) Casey Jarvis	73-78=151	+11	10,000
CUT	(United States) Carter Jenkins	73-78=151	+11	10,000
CUT	(United States) Willie Mack III	71-80=151	+11	10,000
CUT	(United States) Michael McGowan	77-74=151	+11	10,000
CUT	(United States) Gordon Sargent (a)	73-78=151	+11	0
CUT	(United States) Adam Schenk	79-72=151	+11	10,000
CUT	(United States) Andrew Svoboda	75-76=151	+11	10,000
CUT	(United States) Justin Thomas	77-74=151	+11	10,000
CUT	(United States) Brendan Valdes (a)	76-75=151	+11	0
CUT	(United States) Wells Williams (a)	75-76=151	+11	0
CUT	(South Korea) An Byeong-hun	74-78=152	+12	10,000
CUT	(United States) Jake Knapp	75-77=152	+12	10,000
CUT	(Poland) Adrian Meronk	76-76=152	+12	10,000
CUT	(United States) John Chin	75-78=153	+13	10,000
CUT	(Mexico) Santiago de la Fuente (a)	78-75=153	+13	0
CUT	(Scotland) Grant Forrest	77-76=153	+13	10,000
CUT	(United States) Lucas Glover (c)	74-79=153	+13	10,000
CUT	(United States) Jim Herman	74-79=153	+13	10,000
CUT	(United States) Stewart Hagestad (a)	79-75=154	+14	0
CUT	(Canada) Mackenzie Hughes	72-82=154	+14	10,000
CUT	(Italy) Matteo Manassero	79-75=154	+14	10,000
CUT	(United States) Maxwell Moldovan	80-74=154	+14	10,000
CUT	(United States) Phil Mickelson	79-76=155	+15	10,000
CUT	(United States) Chris Naegel	81-74=155	+15	10,000
CUT	(United States) Carson Schaake	79-76=155	+15	10,000
CUT	(United States) Colin Prater (a)	79-78=157	+17	0
CUT	(United States) Otto Black	79-80=159	+19	10,000
CUT	(Japan) Rikuya Hoshino	78-81=159	+19	10,000
CUT	(Japan) Riki Kawamoto	77-82=159	+19	10,000
CUT	(United States) Charlie Reiter	80-80=160	+20	10,000

Note: By USGA policy, all professionals who advance to the U. S. Open are awarded $10,000 if they miss the cut. Amateurs are paid transportation, lodging, and caddy fees, up to $3,000 allowed by rule, and depending on status, may accept up to $1,000 cash.

==== Scorecard ====
Hole	1	2	3	4	5	6	7	8	9	10	11	12	13	14	15	16	17	18
Par	4	4	4	4	5	3	4	4	3	5	4	4	4	4	3	4	3	4
(United States) DeChambeau	−7	−7	−7	−6	−6	−6	−6	−6	−6	−7	−7	−6	−7	−7	−6	−6	−6	−6
(Northern Ireland) McIlroy	−5	−5	−5	−5	−4	−4	−4	−4	−5	−6	−6	−7	−8	−8	−7	−6	−6	−5
(United States) Cantlay	−4	−4	−4	−3	−3	−3	−4	−4	−4	−5	−5	−4	−5	−5	−5	−4	−4	−4
(United States) Finau	−1	E	E	+1	−1	−1	−1	−1	−1	−2	−2	−2	−3	−3	−3	−3	−3	−4
(France) Pavon	−3	−3	−4	−3	−3	−3	−3	−2	−2	−2	−2	−1	−2	−2	−3	−3	−3	−3
(Japan) Matsuyama	−2	−2	−2	−2	−2	−2	−2	−2	−1	−1	−1	−1	−2	−2	−2	−2	−2	−2

Cumulative tournament scores, relative to par

Eagle	Birdie	Bogey
