= Michael Brennan (golfer) =

American professional golfer (born 2002)

Personal information
- Nationality: United States
- Born: February 9, 2002 (age 24) Leesburg, Virginia, U.S.
- Height: 6 ft 1 in (185 cm)
- Weight: 190 lb (86 kg)

Career
- Sport: Golf
- College: Wake Forest University
- Turned professional: 2024
- Current tour: PGA Tour
- Former tours: Minor League Golf Tour; PGA Tour Americas
- Professional wins: 7
- Highest ranking: 18 (October 25, 2026) (as of October 25, 2026)

Number of wins by tour
- PGA Tour: 3
- Other: 4

Best results in major championships
- Masters Tournament: T24: 2026
- PGA Championship: 81st: 2026
- U.S. Open: T43: 2026
- The Open Championship: T53: 2026

Achievements and awards
- PGA Tour Americas points list winner: 2025

Michael Brennan (born February 9, 2002) is an American professional golfer who plays on the PGA Tour, where he has won three tournaments.

After playing collegiately for the Wake Forest Demon Deacons, Brennan turned professional in 2024. He won three PGA Tour Americas titles in 2025 and claimed his first PGA Tour title later that year.

== Early life and amateur career ==
Brennan was born in Leesburg, Virginia, on February 9, 2002. His parents, Shannon and Michael, both played golf and he was introduced to the game as a child. While in kindergarten, Brennan said his dream job was to be a professional golfer. He grew up playing golf at River Creek Club, and began to receive tutelage from coach Adam Harrell at age 12. Alongside golf, Brennan played baseball, basketball, football, lacrosse, and soccer during his youth. He was mentored by 14-time PGA Tour winner Bruce Crampton, who met Brennan at a junior tournament.

At Tuscarora High School, Brennan played basketball and golf. He also attended Loudoun's Academy of Engineering and Technology. In his first high school match, he shot a round of 70 at South Riding Golf Club. He won the 2016 Virginia 5A North region title the following month with a 71. Brennan won the Middle Atlantic Amateur in 2017, becoming at age 15 the youngest player to win the title. He also won the Middle Atlantic Amateur in 2018 and 2019, as well as the 2019 Virginia State Amateur. In 2020, he finished tied-third at the Junior Invitational at Sage Valley and won the Maridoe Junior Invitational. Brennan tied for 11th in the stroke play at the 2020 U.S. Amateur at Bandon Dunes Golf Resort; his brother Sean caddied for him during the event. He was eliminated in the match play during the round of 64.

In 2019, Brennan committed to play golf for Wake Forest University, beginning in fall 2020. Playing for the Wake Forest Demon Deacons from 2020 to 2024, he won eight individual titles in his collegiate career, including medalist honors at the ACC Championship in 2023 and 2024.

Brennan shot a 5-under 66 at Riviera Country Club in February 2022 to win the Genesis Invitational Collegiate Showcase, which earned him entry to the Genesis Invitational. Making his PGA Tour debut, he shot 71-73 and missed the cut by two strokes. He represented the United States at the 2022 Arnold Palmer Cup in June. Brennan made his major championship debut at the 2023 U.S. Open, after advancing through a playoff to qualify. He shot 74-75 and missed the cut.

With a career stroke average of 71.46, Brennan ranked fourth in Wake Forest history, behind Alex Fitzpatrick (70.94), Bill Haas (70.87), and Will Zalatoris (70.44). Brennan was a four-time Academic All-ACC nominee and graduated with a degree in economics in 2024.

== Professional career ==
After finishing his collegiate career in 2024, Brennan turned professional. As he ranked 12th in the PGA Tour University standings for his senior season, he received playing status on the PGA Tour Americas. During the 2025 PGA Tour Americas season, Brennan won three titles and led the tour's point list, securing promotion to the Korn Ferry Tour in 2026.

In October 2025, Brennan received a sponsor exemption to play in the Bank of Utah Championship on the PGA Tour. This was his first PGA Tour start as a professional. He shot a 7-under 64 in the third round to establish a two-stroke lead. He closed with a 66 to win by four strokes over Rico Hoey. With the win, Brennan bypassed the Korn Ferry Tour and immediately earned membership on the PGA Tour. He also became the first player since Jim Benepe in the 1988 Western Open to win in his first start as a professional on the PGA Tour. The victory moved Brennan up to 43rd in the Official World Golf Ranking, after starting the year at 681st. Brennan had an average driving distance of 351 yards (321 m) during the tournament and gained 7.6 strokes off the tee, which was the most strokes gained in a single tournament in that category during the 2025 PGA Tour season.

Brennan was one of 14 players who made the cut at all four major championships in 2026; his best finish was tied-24th at the Masters Tournament.

In August 2026, Brennan won the Wyndham Championship for his second PGA Tour victory. He finished at 22-under 258, winning by three strokes over Beau Hossler. Brennan birdied five consecutive holes on the front nine in the final round to turn a one-shot deficit into a three-shot lead. He secured the win and a FedEx Cup playoffs berth with a birdie on the 18th hole. In October, Brennan won the Baycurrent Classic for his second victory of the season, parring the final six holes for a 3-under 68 and a one-shot victory over Jacob Bridgeman and Keith Mitchell. This was his third PGA Tour victory in his 33rd start.

== Amateur wins ==
- 2017 VSGA Junior Match Play Championship, Middle Atlantic Amateur
- 2018 Dustin Johnson World Junior Championship, Middle Atlantic Amateur
- 2019 Scott Robertson Memorial, Virginia State Amateur, Middle Atlantic Amateur
- 2020 Maridoe Junior Invitational
- 2021 Kiawah Invitational, Wake Forest Invitational, Old Town Club Collegiate, Colonial Collegiate Invite
- 2023 Southwestern Invitational, ACC Men's Golf Championship, Chicago Highlands Invitational
- 2024 ACC Men's Golf Championship

== Professional wins (7) ==
=== PGA Tour wins (3) ===
| No. | Date | Tournament | Winning score | Margin of victory | Runner(s)-up |
|---|---|---|---|---|---|
| 1 | Oct 26, 2025 | Bank of Utah Championship | −22 (67-65-64-66=262) | 4 strokes | (Philippines) Rico Hoey |
| 2 | Aug 9, 2026 | Wyndham Championship | −22 (66-65-63-64=258) | 3 strokes | (United States) Beau Hossler |
| 3 | Oct 11, 2026 | Baycurrent Classic^{1} | −16 (68-67-65-68=268) | 1 stroke | (United States) Jacob Bridgeman, (United States) Keith Mitchell |

^{1}Co-sanctioned by the Japan Golf Tour, but unofficial event on that tour.

=== PGA Tour Americas wins (3) ===
| No. | Date | Tournament | Winning score | Margin of victory | Runner-up |
|---|---|---|---|---|---|
| 1 | Aug 10, 2025 | BioSteel Championship | −25 (61-65-65-64=255) | 5 strokes | (United States) Connor Howe |
| 2 | Aug 30, 2025 | CRMC Championship | −26 (65-66-64-63=258) | Playoff | (United States) Derek Hitchner |
| 3 | Sep 14, 2025 | ATB Classic | −19 (61-66-74-68=269) | 1 stroke | (United States) Derek Hitchner |

=== Minor League Golf Tour wins (1) ===
- 2025 Abacoa Winter Classic

== Results in major championships ==
| Tournament | 2023 | 2024 | 2025 | 2026 |
|---|---|---|---|---|
| Masters Tournament | | | | T24 |
| PGA Championship | | | | 81 |
| U.S. Open | CUT | | | T43 |
| The Open Championship | | | | T53 |

Did not play

CUT = missed the half-way cut
"T" = tied

== U.S. national team appearances ==
- Arnold Palmer Cup: 2022
