= PGA Tour Americas =

Professional golf tour

- Current season, competition or edition: 2026 PGA Tour Americas
- Formerly: PGA Tour Canada; PGA Tour Latinoamérica
- Sport: Golf
- Founded: 2023
- Founder: PGA Tour
- First season: 2024
- Country: Based in North and South America
- Related competitions: PGA Tour; Korn Ferry Tour
- Website: pgatour.com/americas

PGA Tour Americas is a golf tour that began play in 2024. The tour replaces the previous PGA Tour Canada and the PGA Tour Latinoamérica, and will consist of a Latin America swing from February to May, and a North America swing from June to September, consisting of events in Canada and the United States. The tour will provide opportunities for golfers to qualify for the Korn Ferry Tour and the final stage of the PGA Tour Q-School.

== History ==
On April 25, 2023, the PGA Tour announced the creation of the PGA Tour Americas, a new tour combining the PGA Tour Canada and PGA Tour Latinoamérica into one continental tour.

== Qualification ==
The top 60 players from the 2023 PGA Tour Latinoamérica and the top 60 players from the 2023 PGA Tour Canada will be exempt through the Latin America swing. After the Latin America swing, the top 60 players will be exempt for the North America swing. Also, the tour will hold a mid-season qualifying tournament to determine additional golfers who will be eligible for the second half of the season. In addition, the golfers ranked 6-20 on the PGA Tour University rankings will be eligible to compete on the North America swing. In 2024, the exemption for PGA Tour America status was moved to those who placed 11-25 in the PGA Tour University rankings.

After each season, the top ten golfers will receive tour cards for the Korn Ferry Tour for the next season. In addition, the top two finishers from the Latin America swing and the top three finishers from the North American swing, if they finish outside the top ten of the overall rankings, will have conditional membership on the Korn Ferry Tour. In addition, all of those who receive Korn Ferry Tour cards will be exempt into the final stage of the PGA Tour Q-School for the next season. The Fortinet Cup champion (the season-ending leader of the tour's points system) and three-time single-season winners are exempt from reshuffles. The remainder are exempt through the third reshuffle. Those who finish inside the top eighty of the Fortinet Cup standings retain exempt PGA Tour Americas status and those up to 100th are given conditional status.

The PGA Tour Q School also awards PGA Tour America cards to medalists in the First Stage.

== Points list winners ==
Season	Points list	Points
2026	(United States) Thomas Ponder	1,566
2025	(United States) Michael Brennan	2,534
2024	(United States) Johnny Keefer	2,022
