= Ben James =

American professional golfer (born 2003)

Personal information
- Full name: Benjamin James
- Nationality: United States
- Born: May 30, 2003 (age 23) Milford, Connecticut, U.S.
- Height: 6 ft 2 in (1.88 m)

Career
- Sport: Golf
- College: University of Virginia
- Turned professional: 2026
- Current tour: PGA Tour
- Highest ranking: 83 (November 1, 2026) (as of November 1, 2026)

Best results in major championships
- Masters Tournament: DNP
- PGA Championship: DNP
- U.S. Open: T23: 2026
- The Open Championship: DNP

Benjamin James (born May 30, 2003) is an American professional golfer who plays on the PGA Tour. He was a four-time All-American during his collegiate career at the University of Virginia and finished atop the PGA Tour University rankings to earn membership on the tour in 2026.

== Early life ==
James was born on May 30, 2003, to Gretchen and Don James. His grandfather was a scratch handicap. James started playing golf at age four, when his father took him to Great River Golf Club in Milford, Connecticut. James received coaching from the head professional Tom Rosati. He broke 90 for the first time at Great River aged six, and by age nine he had broken 80.

In 2013, James won the U.S. Kids World Championships at Pinehurst Resort. He recalled in 2022: "I realized I could win against the best kids that were my age, and that was the whole world. That's when I knew I could do this." At age 11, James received a scholarship to play collegiate golf for the University of Connecticut. He later withdrew this commitment and ultimately committed to the University of Virginia. James said in 2015 that his favorite golfer was Patrick Reed, whom he played with in the pro-am of the 2012 Travelers Championship.

James attended Hamden Hall Country Day School in Hamden, Connecticut, where he played on the golf team beginning in seventh grade. In 2021, he won the Scott Robertson Memorial, Team TaylorMade Invitational, New England Junior Amateur, Junior Players Championship, and the PING Invitational. He shot 7-under 209 at the latter event to win by nine strokes ahead of Caleb Surratt. In 2022, James won the Dustin Johnson World Junior Championship and the Team TaylorMade Invitational. He ended his junior career ranked No. 1 in the nation by the American Junior Golf Association. Hamden Hall golf coach Keith Kaliszewski said in 2022: "Ben is a once in a lifetime kind of player to have the opportunity to be around and coach." James made his PGA Tour debut as a sponsor exemption at the 2022 Travelers Championship.

== Collegiate career ==
As a freshman at the University of Virginia, James shot 20-under 196 to claim individual victory in his collegiate debut at the Streamsong Invitational in September 2022. He went bogey free for the entirety of the tournament. In total, James recorded five first-place individual finishes during the season and had a 69.00 scoring average, which was the lowest in Virginia Cavaliers program history. He was named a first-team All American and won the 2023 Phil Mickelson Award as the freshman of the year.

James had a 70.31 scoring average in his sophomore season. He tied for second at the 2024 NCAA Division I men's golf championship, which was the best-ever finish by a Virginia Cavalier at the NCAA championship. James made his major championship debut at the 2024 U.S. Open, after shooting 11-under 131 to claim medalist honors during qualifying at Canoe Brook Country Club. He missed the cut by one stroke at Pinehurst No. 2. He made his first cut on the PGA Tour at the 2024 Rocket Mortgage Classic, where he finished tied-44th.

In September 2024, James shot a final-round 66 to erase a five-shot deficit and win the Valero Texas Collegiate. With the win, he earned an exemption to the 2025 Valero Texas Open on the PGA Tour, where he tied for 33rd place. James won his seventh collegiate title in May 2026, at the NCAA Winston-Salem Regional. His score of 19-under 194 was the lowest in NCAA Regional history. The win also tied him with Ben Kohles for most individual victories by a University of Virginia golfer. James ended his senior season with a scoring average of 68.91, which was a new single-season record.

James was a first-team All American during all four years of his collegiate career. He was the fifth man to accomplish this feat, joining Gary Hallberg (1977–80), Phil Mickelson (1989–92), David Duval (1990–93), and Bryce Molder (1998–2001). James was selected to represent the United States at the Arnold Palmer Cup in 2023 and 2024, and the Walker Cup in 2023 and 2025. He helped the United States to victory in each of those competitions. He ended his amateur career at No. 2 in the World Amateur Golf Ranking, behind Jackson Koivun.

== Professional career ==
James finished first in the PGA Tour University rankings for 2026 and earned membership on the PGA Tour. In his professional debut at the RBC Canadian Open in June 2026, he shot a 7-under 63 in the second round to establish a one-stroke lead atop the leaderboard. He struggled in the third round, carding a 78 to fall 11 strokes behind the lead, and shot a final-round 69 to end the tournament in tied-54th place. James shot a final-round 61 to finish third at the Wyndham Championship in August 2026.

== Amateur wins ==
- 2018 New England Junior Amateur Invitational
- 2019 Killington Junior Golf Championship, Connecticut Junior Amateur, New England Junior Amateur Invitational
- 2021 Scott Robertson Memorial, Team TaylorMade Invitational, New England Junior Amateur Invitational, Junior Players Championship, PING Invitational
- 2022 Dustin Johnson World Junior, Team TaylorMade Invitational, Streamsong Invitational, Hamptons Intercollegiate
- 2023 General Hackler Championship, Lewis Chitengwa Memorial, NCAA Las Vegas Regional, South Beach International Amateur
- 2024 Valero Texas Collegiate
- 2026 NCAA Winston-Salem Regional

== Playoff record ==
PGA Tour playoff record (0–1)

| No. | Year | Tournament | Opponent | Result |
|---|---|---|---|---|
| 1 | 2026 | World Wide Technology Championship | (United States) Blades Brown | Lost to birdie on second extra hole |

== Results in major championships ==
| Tournament | 2024 | 2025 | 2026 |
|---|---|---|---|
| Masters Tournament | | | |
| PGA Championship | | | |
| U.S. Open | CUT | CUT | T23 |
| The Open Championship | | | |

Did not play

CUT = missed the half-way cut
"T" = tied

== U.S. national team appearances ==
- Junior Presidents Cup: 2019 (winners)
- Arnold Palmer Cup: 2023 (winners), 2024 (winners)
- Walker Cup: 2023 (winners), 2025 (winners)
