= 2026 PGA Tour =

Golf tour season

2026 PGA Tour season
- Duration: January 15, 2026 – November 22, 2026
- Number of official events: 45 (Note: One further tournament was canceled.)
- FedEx Cup: (United States) Scottie Scheffler

The 2026 PGA Tour is the 111th season of the PGA Tour, the main professional golf tour in the United States. It is also the 58th season since separating from the PGA of America, and the 20th edition of the FedEx Cup.

== Changes for 2026 ==
The 2026 season saw the introduction of a new signature event, the Cadillac Championship. The Mexico Open was moved to the FedExCup Fall.

On October 22, 2025, the PGA Tour announced that The Sentry was canceled as a result of course issues at the Kapalua Resort. Tournament winners in 2025 who did not finish inside the top 50 of the FedEx Cup were eligible to play in the RBC Heritage instead.

== Schedule ==
The following table lists official events during the 2026 season.

| Date | Tournament | Location | Purse (US$) | Winner(s) (Note: The number in parentheses after each winner's name is the number of PGA Tour events they had won up to and including that tournament. This information is only shown for PGA Tour members.) | OWGR points | Other tours (Note: EUR − European Tour; JPN − Japan Golf Tour.) | Notes |
|---|---|---|---|---|---|---|---|
| ~~Jan 11~~ | The Sentry | Hawaii | – | Canceled (Note: In September 2025, the PGA Tour announced that The Sentry would not take place at its usual venue, the Kapalua Resort in Hawaii, due to a drought and a water dispute with the Maui Land & Pineapple Company that left the golf course in poor condition. In October 2025, the PGA Tour announced that the event would be canceled, with players who were tournament winners in 2025 and did not finish inside the Top 50 of the FedEx Cup, eligible to play in the RBC Heritage instead.) | – | | Signature event |
| Jan 18 | Sony Open in Hawaii | Hawaii | 9,100,000 | (United States) Chris Gotterup (3) | 46.95 | | |
| Jan 25 | The American Express | California | 9,200,000 | (United States) Scottie Scheffler (20) | 65.23 | | |
| Feb 1 | Farmers Insurance Open | California | 9,600,000 | (England) Justin Rose (13) | 56.96 | | |
| Feb 8 | WM Phoenix Open | Arizona | 9,600,000 | (United States) Chris Gotterup (4) | 58.09 | | |
| Feb 15 | AT&T Pebble Beach Pro-Am | California | 20,000,000 | (United States) Collin Morikawa (7) | 71.31 | | Signature event |
| Feb 22 | Genesis Invitational | California | 20,000,000 | (United States) Jacob Bridgeman (1) | 69.74 | | Signature event |
| Mar 1 | Cognizant Classic | Florida | 9,600,000 | (Colombia) Nico Echavarría (3) | 36.31 | | |
| Mar 8 | Arnold Palmer Invitational | Florida | 20,000,000 | (United States) Akshay Bhatia (3) | 69.35 | | Signature event |
| Mar 8 | Puerto Rico Open | Puerto Rico | 4,000,000 | (United States) Ricky Castillo (1) | 22.13 | | Additional event |
| Mar 15 | The Players Championship | Florida | 25,000,000 | (United States) Cameron Young (2) | 80 | | Flagship event |
| Mar 22 | Valspar Championship | Florida | 9,100,000 | (England) Matt Fitzpatrick (3) | 48.59 | | |
| Mar 29 | Texas Children's Houston Open | Texas | 9,900,000 | (United States) Gary Woodland (5) | 48.13 | | |
| Apr 5 | Valero Texas Open | Texas | 9,800,000 | (United States) J. J. Spaun (3) | 47.77 | | |
| Apr 12 | Masters Tournament | Georgia | 22,500,000 | (Northern Ireland) Rory McIlroy (30) | 100 | | Major championship |
| Apr 19 | RBC Heritage | South Carolina | 20,000,000 | (England) Matt Fitzpatrick (4) | 55.88 | | Signature event |
| Apr 26 | Zurich Classic of New Orleans | Louisiana | 9,500,000 | (England) Alex Fitzpatrick (1) and (England) Matt Fitzpatrick (5) | n/a | | Team event |
| May 3 | Cadillac Championship | Florida | 20,000,000 | (United States) Cameron Young (3) | 60.63 | | Signature event (Note: New tournament) |
| May 10 | Truist Championship | North Carolina | 20,000,000 | (Norway) Kristoffer Reitan (1) | 60.83 | | Signature event |
| May 10 | Oneflight Myrtle Beach Classic | South Carolina | 4,000,000 | (United States) Brandt Snedeker (10) | 26.48 | | Additional event |
| May 17 | PGA Championship | Pennsylvania | 20,500,000 | (England) Aaron Rai (2) | 100 | | Major championship |
| May 24 | CJ Cup Byron Nelson | Texas | 10,300,000 | (United States) Wyndham Clark (4) | 38.89 | | |
| May 31 | Charles Schwab Challenge | Texas | 9,900,000 | (United States) Russell Henley (6) | 46.41 | | Invitational |
| Jun 7 | Memorial Tournament | Ohio | 20,000,000 | (United States) J. T. Poston (4) | 68.89 | | Signature event |
| Jun 14 | RBC Canadian Open | Canada | 9,800,000 | (United States) Bud Cauley (1) | 47.37 | | |
| Jun 21 | U.S. Open | New York | 22,500,000 | (United States) Wyndham Clark (5) | 100 | | Major championship |
| Jun 29 | Travelers Championship | Connecticut | 20,000,000 | (Norway) Viktor Hovland (8) | 67.53 | | Signature event |
| Jul 5 | John Deere Classic | Illinois | 8,800,000 | (United States) Chris Gotterup (5) | 38.05 | | |
| Jul 12 | Genesis Scottish Open | Scotland | 9,000,000 | (South Korea) Tom Kim (4) | 70.04 | EUR | |
| Jul 12 | ISCO Championship | Kentucky | 4,000,000 | (United States) Steven Fisk (2) | 23.30 | EUR | Additional event |
| Jul 19 | The Open Championship | England | 17,750,000 | (New Zealand) Ryan Fox (3) | 100 | | Major championship |
| Jul 19 | Corales Puntacana Championship | Dominican Republic | 4,000,000 | (Italy) Stefano Mazzoli (1) | 20.96 | EUR | Additional event |
| Jul 26 | 3M Open | Minnesota | 8,800,000 | (United States) Jackson Koivun (1) | 42.18 | | |
| Aug 2 | Rocket Classic | Michigan | 10,000,000 | (United States) Michael Thorbjornsen (1) | 52.82 | | |
| Aug 9 | Wyndham Championship | North Carolina | 8,500,000 | (United States) Michael Brennan (2) | 49.90 | | |
| Aug 16 | FedEx St. Jude Championship | Tennessee | 20,000,000 | (United States) Scottie Scheffler (21) | 68.61 | | FedEx Cup playoff event |
| Aug 23 | BMW Championship | Missouri | 20,000,000 | (United States) Wyndham Clark (6) | 57.48 | | FedEx Cup playoff event |
| Aug 30 | Tour Championship | Georgia | 40,000,000 | (United States) Scottie Scheffler (22) | 44.99 | | FedEx Cup playoff event |
| Sep 20 | Biltmore Championship Asheville | North Carolina | 5,000,000 | (United States) Jacob Bridgeman (2) | 31.88 | | FedEx Cup Fall |
| Oct 4 | Bank of Utah Championship | Utah | 6,000,000 | (United States) Austin Smotherman (1) | 31.06 | | FedEx Cup Fall |
| Oct 11 | Baycurrent Classic | Japan | 8,000,000 | (United States) Michael Brennan (3) | 39.62 | JPN (Note: Japan Golf Tour unofficial event) | FedEx Cup Fall |
| Oct 26 | Butterfield Bermuda Championship | Bermuda | 6,000,000 | (United States) Austin Smotherman (2) | 16.44 (Note: Points reduced to 75% of original amount due to tournament being shortened to 54 holes.) | | FedEx Cup Fall |
| Nov 1 | VidantaWorld Mexico Open | Mexico | 6,000,000 | (United States) Andrew Novak (2) | 29.95 | | FedEx Cup Fall |
| Nov 8 | World Wide Technology Championship | Mexico | 6,000,000 | (United States) Blades Brown (1) | 31.32 | | FedEx Cup Fall |
| Nov 16 | Austin Championship | Texas | 6,000,000 | (United States) Chad Ramey (2) | 31.24 | | FedEx Cup Fall |
| Nov 23 | RSM Classic | Georgia | 7,400,000 | | 38.98 | | FedEx Cup Fall |

=== Unofficial events ===
The following events are sanctioned by the PGA Tour, but do not carry FedEx Cup points or official money, nor are wins official.

| Date | Tournament | Location | Purse ($) | Winner(s) | OWGR points | Notes |
|---|---|---|---|---|---|---|
| Sep 27 | Presidents Cup | Illinois | n/a | Team USA | n/a | Team event |
| Dec 6 | Hero World Challenge | Bahamas | 5,000,000 | | | Limited-field event |
| Dec 13 | Grant Thornton Invitational | Florida | 4,100,000 | | n/a | Team event |

== See also ==
- 2026 Korn Ferry Tour
- 2026 PGA Tour Champions season
