= Bank of Utah Championship =

Golf tournament

Tournament information
- Location: Ivins, Utah
- Established: 2024
- Course: Black Desert Resort
- Par: 71
- Length: 7,421 yards (6,786 m)
- Tour: PGA Tour
- Format: Stroke play
- Prize fund: US$6,000,000
- Month played: October

Tournament record score
- Aggregate: 258 Austin Smotherman (2026)
- To par: −26 as above

Current champion
- (United States) Austin Smotherman

Location map
- Location within the United States Location within Utah

The Bank of Utah Championship is a golf tournament on the PGA Tour. It is played at the Black Desert Resort in Ivins, Utah. It was first played in 2024 as part of the FedEx Cup Fall series. The event was renamed from Black Desert Championship to Bank of Utah Championship for 2025 after a three-year sponsorship deal was signed with the Ogden-based Bank of Utah.

Matt McCarty won the inaugural tournament for his first PGA Tour victory.

== Winners ==
Year	Winner	Score	To par	Margin of victory	Runner-up
Bank of Utah Championship
2026	(United States) Austin Smotherman	258	−26	2 strokes	(United States) Doug Ghim
2025	(United States) Michael Brennan	262	−22	4 strokes	(Philippines) Rico Hoey
Black Desert Championship
2024	(United States) Matt McCarty	261	−23	3 strokes	(Germany) Stephan Jäger
