= Jacob Bridgeman =

American professional golfer (born 1999)

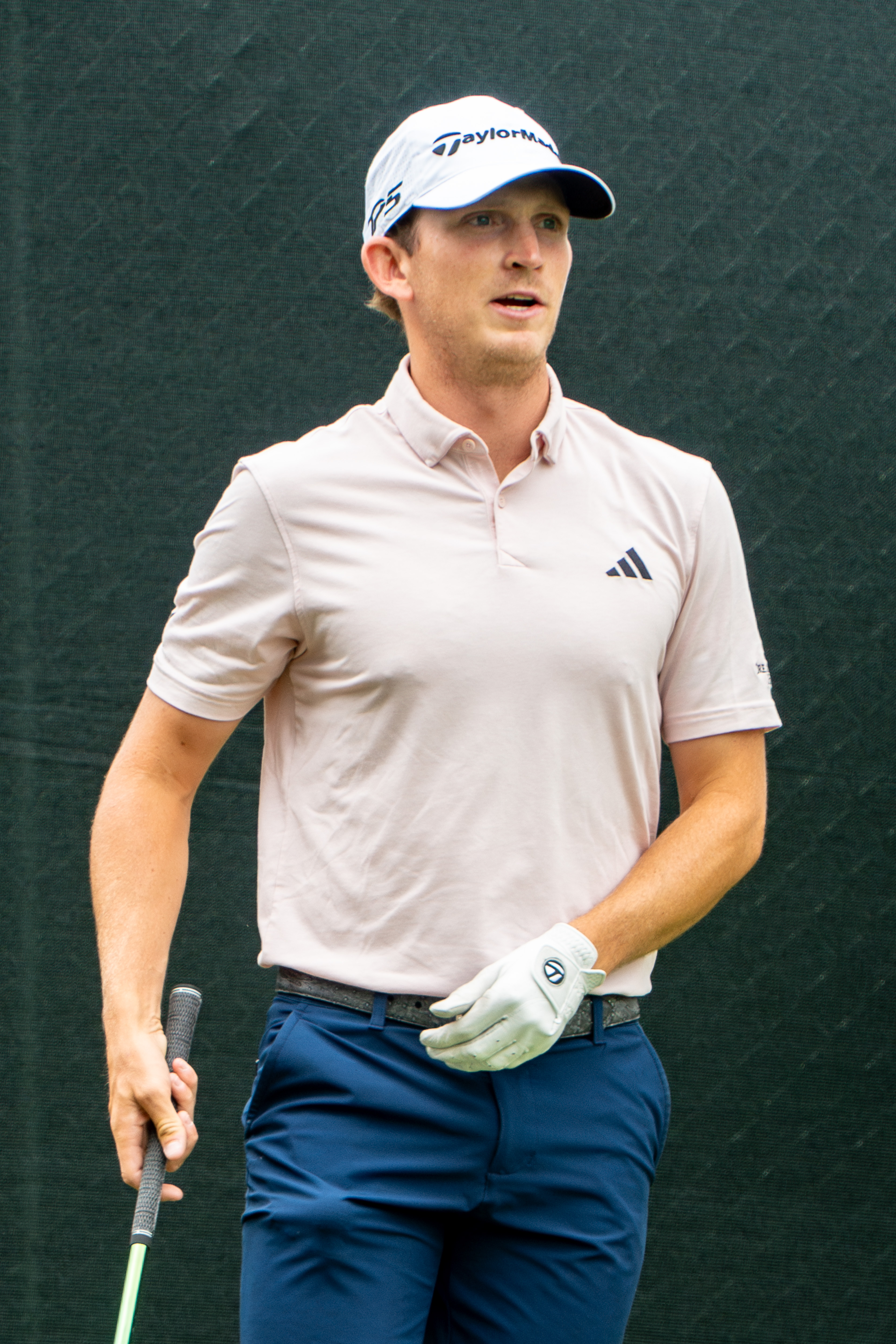

Personal information
- Nationality: United States
- Born: December 6, 1999 (age 26) Inman, South Carolina, U.S.
- Height: 5 ft 10 in (178 cm)
- Weight: 170 lb (77 kg)

Career
- Sport: Golf
- College: Clemson University
- Turned professional: 2022
- Current tour: PGA Tour
- Former tour: Korn Ferry Tour
- Professional wins: 2
- Highest ranking: 16 (October 18, 2026) (as of October 25, 2026)

Number of wins by tour
- PGA Tour: 2

Best results in major championships
- Masters Tournament: T41: 2026
- PGA Championship: CUT: 2025, 2026
- U.S. Open: T39: 2026
- The Open Championship: T28: 2026

Jacob Bridgeman (born December 6, 1999) is an American professional golfer on the PGA Tour. He was the 2022 ACC Golfer of the Year before turning pro later that year. After earning his PGA Tour card via the Korn Ferry Tour in 2023, he secured his first PGA Tour victory at the 2026 Genesis Invitational.

== Early life ==
Bridgeman was born in Inman, South Carolina. He attended Chapman High School and won three 3A individual golf state titles. in 2016, Bridgeman won the Carolinas Junior Boys' Championship.

== College career ==
Bridgeman competed for the Clemson Tigers, where he studied mathematical science. While at Clemson, Bridgeman won five events and set a Clemson record for 50 career rounds in the 60s. He was named ACC Golfer of the Year in 2022.

== Professional career ==
After finishing second in the 2022 PGA Tour University ranking, Bridgeman turned professional and began playing on the Korn Ferry Tour. In 2023, he earned his PGA Tour card after finishing 14th on the season-long points list.

Bridgeman had a consistent 2025 PGA Tour season with four top-5 finishes, including a runner-up finish at the Cognizant Classic. This got him into the Tour Championship after finishing 27th on the FedEx Cup standings.

Bridgeman earned his first career PGA Tour win on February 22, 2026, at the Genesis Invitational.

== Amateur wins ==
- 2016 Carolinas Junior Boys' Championship
- 2019 Puerto Rico Individual Classic
- 2020 Cleveland Golf Palmetto Invite
- 2021 Camp Creek Seminole Invite, Cleveland Golf Palmetto Invite
- 2022 Linger Longer Invitational, ACC Men's Golf Championship

== Professional wins (2) ==
=== PGA Tour wins (2) ===
Legend
Signature events (1)
Other PGA Tour (1)

No.	Date	Tournament	Winning score	To par	Margin of victory	Runner(s)-up
1	Feb 22, 2026	Genesis Invitational	66-64-64-72=266	−18	1 stroke	(United States) Kurt Kitayama, (Northern Ireland) Rory McIlroy
2	Sep 20, 2026	Biltmore Championship Asheville	66-67-64-61=258	−26	2 strokes	(United States) Ben James

== Results in major championships ==
Tournament	2025	2026
Masters Tournament		T41
PGA Championship	CUT	CUT
U.S. Open	CUT	T39
The Open Championship		T28

Did not play

CUT = missed the half-way cut
"T" = tied

== U.S. national team appearances ==
Amateur

- Junior Presidents Cup: 2017 (winners)
- Arnold Palmer Cup: 2021 (winners)

Professional

- Presidents Cup: 2026 (winners)
