= 2016 FedEx Cup Playoffs =

Tournament information
- Dates: August 25 – September 25, 2016
- Location: Bethpage Black Course; TPC Boston; Crooked Stick Golf Club; East Lake Golf Club
- Tour: PGA Tour

Statistics
- Field: 125 for The Barclays; 100 for Deutsche Bank Ch. 70 for BMW Championship; 30 for Tour Championship
- Prize fund: $35,000,000 bonus money
- Winner's share: $10,000,000 bonus money

Champion
- (Northern Ireland) Rory McIlroy
- 3,120 points

The 2016 FedEx Cup Playoffs, the series of four golf tournaments that determined the season champion on the U.S.-based PGA Tour, was played from August 25 to September 25. It included the following four events:

- The Barclays – Bethpage Black Course, Farmingdale, New York
- Deutsche Bank Championship – TPC Boston, Norton, Massachusetts
- BMW Championship – Crooked Stick Golf Club, Carmel, Indiana
- Tour Championship – East Lake Golf Club, Atlanta, Georgia

These were the 10th FedEx Cup playoffs since their inception in 2007.

The point distributions can be seen here.

== Regular season rankings ==
Place	Player	Points	Events
1	(Australia) Jason Day	2,735	16
2	(United States) Dustin Johnson	2,701	18
3	(Australia) Adam Scott	2,063	16
4	(Scotland) Russell Knox	2,001	21
5	(United States) Jordan Spieth	1,965	17
6	(United States) Brandt Snedeker	1,717	23
7	(United States) Patrick Reed	1,575	24
8	(United States) Phil Mickelson	1,532	18
9	(United States) Kevin Na	1,529	23
10	(United States) Justin Thomas	1,512	24

== The Barclays ==
The Barclays was played August 25–28. Of the 125 players eligible to play in the event, five did not enter: Sergio García (ranked 20), Alex Čejka (59), Danny Willett (75), Shane Lowry (87), and Anirban Lahiri (117). Of the 120 entrants, 79 made the second-round cut at 145 (+3). Despite there being more than 78 players making the cut there was no secondary cut after the third round as in regular PGA Tour events, following a change made after the 2014 season.

Patrick Reed won by a stroke over Emiliano Grillo and Sean O'Hair and moved from seventh place to first place in the standings. The top 100 players in the points standings advanced to the Deutsche Bank Championship. This included five players who were outside the top 100 prior to The Barclays: Sean O'Hair (ranked 108th to 15th), Kang Sung-hoon (122 to 88), John Huh (111 to 90), Tyrone van Aswegen (104to 93), and Derek Fathauer (118 to 99). Five players started the tournament within the top 100 but ended the tournament outside the top 100, ending their playoff chances: Shane Lowry (ranked 87th to 102nd), Peter Malnati (93 to 104), Robert Streb (95 to 105), Lucas Glover (96 to 106), and Jonas Blixt (100 to 107).

The tournament was the last qualifying event for the eight qualifying places for the American team in the 2016 Ryder Cup.

					FedEx Cup rank	
Place	Player	Score	To par	Winnings ($)	After	Before
1	(United States) Patrick Reed	66-68-71-70=275	−9	1,530,000	1	7
T2	(Argentina) Emiliano Grillo	67-69-71-69=276	−8	748,000	6	32
T2	(United States) Sean O'Hair	69-69-72-66=276	−8	748,000	15	108
T4	(Australia) Jason Day	68-70-70-69=277	−7	351,333	2	1
T4	(Australia) Adam Scott	69-72-65-71=277	−7	351,333	4	3
T4	(United States) Gary Woodland	71-69-68-69=277	−7	351,333	24	42
T7	(United States) Rickie Fowler	67-69-68-74=278	−6	264,917	16	28
T7	(United States) Jason Kokrak	74-66-69-69=278	−6	264,917	43	65
T7	(United States) Ryan Moore	69-68-72-69=278	−6	264,917	11	23
T10	(United States) Jordan Spieth	71-67-72-69=279	−5	221,000	5	5
T10	(United States) Justin Thomas	71-71-66-71=279	−5	221,000	8	10

- Par 71 course

== Deutsche Bank Championship ==
The Deutsche Bank Championship was played September 2–5. Of the 100 players eligible to play in the event, three did not play. Kevin Na (ranked 14) withdrew before the event because of the recent birth of his daughter. Alex Čejka (73) withdrew before the event with a lower back injury. Danny Willett (86) did not enter and played in the Omega European Masters instead. Of the 97 entrants, 72 made the second-round cut at 141 (−1).

Rory McIlroy won by two strokes over Paul Casey and moved to fourth in the standings. The top 70 players in the points standings advanced to the BMW Championship. This included six players who were outside the top 70 prior to the Deutsche Bank Championship: Billy Hurley III (77 to 51), David Hearn (92 to 59), Hudson Swafford (82 to 61), Vaughn Taylor (79 to 64), Chris Kirk (75 to 66), and Marc Leishman (71 to 70). Six players started the tournament within the top 70 but ended the tournament outside the top 70, ending their playoff chances: Ricky Barnes (68 to 71), Jerry Kelly (61 to 72), Martin Laird (63 to 77), Johnson Wagner (69 to 78), Colt Knost (65 to 79), and Chez Reavie (70 to 81).

					FedEx Cup rank	
Place	Player	Score	To par	Winnings ($)	After	Before
1	(Northern Ireland) Rory McIlroy	71-67-66-65=269	−15	1,530,000	4	38
2	(England) Paul Casey	66-66-66-73=271	−13	918,000	10	59
3	(United States) Jimmy Walker	68-64-70-70=272	−12	578,000	9	25
4	(Australia) Adam Scott	67-71-70-65=273	−11	408,000	5	4
T5	(Argentina) Fabián Gómez	66-71-68-69=274	−10	301,250	32	48
T5	(United States) James Hahn	65-74-66-69=274	−10	301,250	39	55
T5	(United States) Patrick Reed	68-67-70-69=274	−10	301,250	1	1
T8	(United States) Kevin Chappell	67-64-71-73=275	−9	212,500	13	13
T8	(Canada) David Hearn	68-68-69-70=275	−9	212,500	59	92
T8	(United States) Billy Hurley III	67-69-69-70=275	−9	212,500	51	77
T8	(United States) Dustin Johnson	68-66-75-66=275	−9	212,500	3	3
T8	(United States) Jason Kokrak	70-68-71-66=275	−9	212,500	34	43
T8	(United States) Ryan Moore	65-70-68-72=275	−9	212,500	12	11
T8	(South Africa) Louis Oosthuizen	71-69-64-71=275	−9	212,500	40	44

- Par 71 course

== BMW Championship ==
The BMW Championship was played September 8–11. Of the 70 players eligible to play in the event, only Henrik Stenson (knee injury) did not play. There was no cut.

Dustin Johnson won by three strokes over Paul Casey. The top 30 players in the points standings advanced to the Tour Championship. This included four players who were outside the top 30 prior to the BMW Championship: Roberto Castro (53 to 21), Daniel Berger (31 to 26), J. B. Holmes (42 to 28), and Charl Schwartzel (43 to 30). Four players started the tournament within the top 30 but ended the tournament outside the top 30, ending their playoff chances: Rickie Fowler (22 to 31), Sergio García (25 to 32), Brooks Koepka (30 to 35) and Henrik Stenson (24 to 36).

					FedEx Cup rank	
Place	Player	Score	To par	Winnings ($)	After	Before
1	(United States) Dustin Johnson	67-63-68-67=265	−23	1,530,000	1	3
2	(England) Paul Casey	67-66-68-67=268	−20	918,000	5	10
3	(United States) Roberto Castro	65-65-74-67=271	−17	578,000	21	53
T4	(United States) J. B. Holmes	69-65-68-74=276	−12	323,850	28	42
T4	(United States) Matt Kuchar	68-69-68-71=276	−12	323,850	16	28
T4	(United States) Ryan Palmer	73-64-69-70=276	−12	323,850	34	47
T4	(South Africa) Charl Schwartzel	70-70-72-64=276	−12	323,850	30	43
T4	(Australia) Adam Scott	69-69-67-71=276	−12	323,850	3	5
9	(United States) Jordan Spieth	68-72-68-69=277	−11	246,500	7	6
T10	(United States) Daniel Berger	70-68-71-69=278	−10	212,500	26	31
T10	(United States) Billy Horschel	73-68-67-70=278	−10	212,500	50	62
T10	(United States) Chris Kirk	68-66-73-71=278	−10	212,500	54	66

- Par 72 course

== Reset points ==
The points were reset after the BMW Championship.

Place	Player	Points	Reset points	Events
1	(United States) Dustin Johnson	5,189	2,000	21
2	(United States) Patrick Reed	4,203	1,800	27
3	(Australia) Adam Scott	3,479	1,600	19
4	(Australia) Jason Day	3,409	1,440	19
5	(England) Paul Casey	3,252	1,280	21
6	(Northern Ireland) Rory McIlroy	3,223	1,120	17
7	(United States) Jordan Spieth	2,771	960	20
8	(Scotland) Russell Knox	2,465	800	24
9	(Argentina) Emiliano Grillo	2,371	640	24
10	(United States) Jimmy Walker	2,340	480	24

== Tour Championship ==
The Tour Championship was played September 22–25. All 30 golfers who qualified for the tournament played, and there was no cut. Rory McIlroy won tournament and the FedEx Cup, beating Kevin Chappell and Ryan Moore in a playoff.

					FedEx Cup rank	
Place	Player	Score	To par	Winnings ($)	After	Before
1	(Northern Ireland) Rory McIlroy	68-70-66-64=268	−12	1,530,000	1	6
T2	(United States) Kevin Chappell	66-68-68-66=268	−12	752,250	8	15
T2	(United States) Ryan Moore	70-68-66-64=268	−12	752,250	7	14
4	(England) Paul Casey	68-70-69-64=271	−9	408,000	5	5
5	(Japan) Hideki Matsuyama	66-71-68-69=274	−6	340,000	13	17
T6	(United States) Dustin Johnson	66-67-69-73=275	−5	297,500	2	1
T6	(United States) Justin Thomas	68-71-69-67=275	−5	297,500	12	13
T8	(United States) Jason Dufner	73-67-66-70=276	−4	263,500	19	27
T8	(Australia) Adam Scott	69-71-71-65=276	−4	263,500	4	3
10	(Argentina) Emiliano Grillo	73-70-66-69=278	−2	218,620	11	9
10	(South Korea) Kim Si-woo	67-72-74-65=278	−2	218,620	17	18
10	(South Africa) Charl Schwartzel	74-67-66-71=278	−2	218,620	25	30
10	(United States) Bubba Watson	72-73-66-67=278	−2	218,620	21	24
10	(United States) Gary Woodland	72-70-69-67=278	−2	218,620	20	20

- Par 70 course

== Final leaderboard ==
Place	Player	Points	Winnings ($)
1	(Northern Ireland) Rory McIlroy	3,120	10,000,000
2	(United States) Dustin Johnson	2,380	3,000,000
3	(United States) Patrick Reed	1,986	2,000,000
4	(Australia) Adam Scott	1,930	1,500,000
5	(England) Paul Casey	1,880	1,000,000
6	(Australia) Jason Day	1,440	800,000
7	(United States) Ryan Moore	1,336	700,000
8	(United States) Kevin Chappell	1,320	600,000
9	(United States) Jordan Spieth	1,168	550,000
10	(Scotland) Russell Knox	992	500,000

For the full list see here.

== Table of qualifying players ==
Table key:

Win
Top-10 finish
Did not advance to next tournament
Played way into next tournament

	Player	Pre-Playoffs		The Barclays		Deutsche Bank		BMW Champ.		Reset points	Tour Champ.	
	Player	Points	Rank	Finish	Rank after	Finish	Rank after	Finish	Rank after	Reset points	Finish	Final rank
(Australia)	Jason Day	2,735	1	T4	2	T15	2	WD	4	1,440	WD	6
(United States)	Dustin Johnson	2,701	2	T18	3	T8	3	1	1	2,000	T6	2
(Australia)	Adam Scott	2,063	3	T4	4	4	5	T4	3	1,600	T8	4
(Scotland)	Russell Knox	2,061	4	T60	7	T15	7	T17	8	800	23	10
(United States)	Jordan Spieth	1,965	5	T10	5	T21	6	9	7	960	T17	9
(United States)	Brandt Snedeker	1,717	6	T48	9	T46	11	T13	11	384	T17	15
(United States)	Patrick Reed	1,575	7	1	1	T5	1	T13	2	1,800	T24	3
(United States)	Phil Mickelson	1,532	8	T13	10	CUT	15	T24	13	352	22	16
(United States)	Kevin Na	1,529	9	CUT	14	DNP	23	T20	22	232	29	28
(United States)	Justin Thomas	1,512	10	T10	8	CUT	14	T32	12	368	T6	12
(United States)	Kevin Kisner	1,491	11	T48	12	T46	17	T39	19	256	26	23
(Japan)	Hideki Matsuyama	1,468	12	CUT	17	T15	16	T24	17	288	5	13
(United States)	Kevin Chappell	1,422	13	T31	13	T8	13	T61	15	320	T2	8
(Sweden)	Henrik Stenson	1,387	14	WD	21	T41	24	DNP	36	–	–	36
(South Korea)	Kim Si-woo*	1,382	15	CUT	22	T15	18	T20	18	272	T10	17
(United States)	William McGirt	1,360	16	T41	18	CUT	26	T20	23	224	T17	24
(United States)	Jimmy Walker	1,352	17	CUT	25	3	9	T13	10	480	28	14
(United States)	Matt Kuchar	1,349	18	T64	23	T46	28	T4	16	304	T15	18
(United States)	Brooks Koepka	1,348	19	T70	26	T57	30	T32	35	–	–	35
(Spain)	Sergio García	1,306	20	DNP	28	T24	25	T47	32	–	–	32
(United States)	Jason Dufner	1,273	21	T22	20	T33	19	60	27	192	T8	19
(United States)	Daniel Berger	1,254	22	T70	30	T41	31	T10	26	200	T15	26
(United States)	Ryan Moore	1,235	23	T7	11	T8	12	T64	14	336	T2	7
(United States)	Bubba Watson	1,235	24	T13	19	CUT	27	T20	24	216	T10	21
(South Africa)	Branden Grace*	1,187	25	CUT	33	T41	37	T32	41	–	–	41
(United States)	Smylie Kaufman*	1,181	26	CUT	34	T24	33	T56	43	–	–	43
(Northern Ireland)	Graeme McDowell	1,142	27	CUT	35	CUT	45	T42	48	–	–	48
(United States)	Rickie Fowler	1,131	28	T7	16	T46	22	59	31	–	–	31
(United States)	Bill Haas	1,129	29	CUT	36	T67	46	T32	46	–	–	46
(South Africa)	Charl Schwartzel	1,127	30	T53	32	70	43	T4	30	168	T10	25
(Venezuela)	Jhonattan Vegas	1,119	31	T22	29	T33	29	T24	29	176	T24	29
(Argentina)	Emiliano Grillo*	1,109	32	T2	6	T33	8	T32	9	640	T10	11
(United States)	Charley Hoffman	1,087	33	T13	27	CUT	36	T52	44	–	–	44
(United States)	Scott Piercy	1,077	34	T22	31	T53	35	T24	37	–	–	37
(United States)	Harris English	1,032	35	T60	41	T41	44	T47	47	–	–	47
(Northern Ireland)	Rory McIlroy	973	36	T31	38	1	4	T42	6	1,120	1	1
(United States)	Daniel Summerhays	963	37	CUT	47	CUT	55	68	65	–	–	65
(United States)	J. B. Holmes	956	38	T41	42	T33	42	T4	28	184	27	30
(United States)	Charles Howell III	931	39	CUT	50	T24	48	T47	52	–	–	52
(Argentina)	Fabián Gómez	924	40	T60	48	T5	32	T47	40	–	–	40
(United States)	Jim Herman	923	41	T22	39	T33	41	T24	42	–	–	42
(United States)	Gary Woodland	907	42	T4	24	T15	21	T24	20	248	T10	20
(United States)	Jamie Lovemark*	904	43	T22	40	71	49	T32	49	–	–	49
(United States)	James Hahn	878	44	CUT	55	T5	39	T24	39	–	–	39
(Australia)	Aaron Baddeley	874	45	CUT	56	T67	67	T61	69	–	–	69
(United States)	Tony Finau	864	46	12	37	T24	38	T66	45	–	–	45
(Sweden)	David Lingmerth	859	47	CUT	58	T63	65	T61	67	–	–	67
(England)	Luke Donald	849	48	T53	53	T65	60	T39	58	–	–	58
(United States)	Jon Curran	840	49	T68	60	T67	69	T47	66	–	–	66
(United States)	Zach Johnson	833	50	T48	52	T57	56	T42	57	–	–	57
(England)	Justin Rose	829	51	T31	45	T57	50	T24	51	–	–	51
(United States)	Kyle Reifers	821	52	T68	62	T41	58	T52	61	–	–	61
(United States)	Roberto Castro	810	53	CUT	64	T24	53	3	21	240	T17	22
(United States)	Colt Knost	803	54	CUT	65	CUT	79	–	–	–	–	79
(United States)	Brendan Steele	791	55	T22	46	72	54	T64	63	–	–	63
(South Africa)	Louis Oosthuizen	769	56	T18	44	T8	40	T17	38	–	–	38
(Australia)	Marc Leishman	765	57	CUT	71	T46	70	T52	68	–	–	68
(United States)	Patton Kizzire*	760	58	CUT	72	CUT	82	–	–	–	–	82
(Germany)	Alex Čejka	754	59	DNP	73	DNP	83	–	–	–	–	83
(United States)	Chris Kirk	749	60	CUT	75	T33	66	T10	54	–	–	54
(United States)	Ben Martin	741	61	T31	54	CUT	68	T66	70	–	–	70
(United States)	Patrick Rodgers*	739	62	CUT	76	T46	74	–	–	–	–	74
(United States)	Ryan Palmer	731	63	T13	49	T24	47	T4	34	–	–	34
(United States)	Vaughn Taylor	726	64	CUT	79	T24	64	T42	62	–	–	62
(United States)	Jason Kokrak	721	65	T7	43	T8	34	T17	33	–	–	33
(United States)	Ricky Barnes	718	66	T53	68	T53	71	–	–	–	–	71
(Sweden)	Freddie Jacobson	714	67	CUT	81	CUT	90	–	–	–	–	90
(England)	Paul Casey	710	68	T31	59	2	10	2	5	1,280	4	5
(United States)	Billy Hurley III	710	69	T64	77	T8	51	T42	55	–	–	55
(South Korea)	K. J. Choi	705	70	CUT	83	CUT	91	–	–	–	–	91
(New Zealand)	Danny Lee	699	71	CUT	85	CUT	92	–	–	–	–	92
(United States)	Billy Horschel	694	72	T13	51	CUT	62	T10	50	–	–	50
(United States)	Kevin Streelman	692	73	T22	57	T57	63	T39	59	–	–	59
(United States)	Jerry Kelly	692	74	T31	61	CUT	72	–	–	–	–	72
(England)	Danny Willett*	691	75	DNP	86	DNP	93	–	–	–	–	93
(United States)	Brian Stuard	680	76	T41	66	T21	52	T56	60	–	–	60
(United States)	Jason Bohn	667	77	77	89	CUT	97	–	–	–	–	97
(United States)	Webb Simpson	666	78	T48	74	CUT	84	–	–	–	–	84
(United States)	Bryce Molder	652	79	CUT	94	T53	89	–	–	–	–	89
(United States)	Spencer Levin	644	80	CUT	96	T57	94	–	–	–	–	94
(United States)	Scott Brown	643	81	CUT	98	T33	80	–	–	–	–	80
(United States)	Harold Varner III*	643	82	T60	87	T33	75	–	–	–	–	75
(United States)	Russell Henley	642	83	T48	78	CUT	87	–	–	–	–	87
(Canada)	Adam Hadwin	638	84	T64	91	T46	85	–	–	–	–	85
(United States)	Chad Campbell	633	85	CUT	100	T21	73	–	–	–	–	73
(United States)	Chez Reavie	630	86	T31	70	CUT	81	–	–	–	–	81
(Republic of Ireland)	Shane Lowry*	615	87	DNP	102	–	–	–	–	–	–	102
(United States)	Brian Harman	607	88	T22	67	T24	57	T13	53	–	–	53
(Scotland)	Martin Laird	605	89	T18	63	CUT	77	–	–	–	–	77
(United States)	Hudson Swafford	603	90	T41	82	T15	61	T56	64	–	–	64
(Canada)	David Hearn	599	91	T53	92	T8	59	T32	56	–	–	56
(United States)	Johnson Wagner	598	92	T22	69	T63	78	–	–	–	–	78
(United States)	Peter Malnati*	596	93	T78	104	–	–	–	–	–	–	104
(United States)	Jim Furyk	591	94	T41	84	T57	86	–	–	–	–	86
(United States)	Robert Streb	590	95	T70	105	–	–	–	–	–	–	105
(United States)	Lucas Glover	587	96	T70	106	–	–	–	–	–	–	106
(Fiji)	Vijay Singh	586	97	T53	95	CUT	99	–	–	–	–	99
(United States)	Steve Stricker	583	98	T53	97	T24	76	–	–	–	–	76
(Australia)	John Senden	577	99	T31	80	CUT	88	–	–	–	–	88
(Sweden)	Jonas Blixt	572	100	T74	107	–	–	–	–	–	–	107
(United States)	Brett Stegmaier*	559	101	WD	108	–	–	–	–	–	–	108
(United States)	Robert Garrigus	558	102	WD	109	–	–	–	–	–	–	109
(United States)	Zac Blair	552	103	T74	110	–	–	–	–	–	–	110
(South Africa)	Tyrone van Aswegen*	550	104	T41	93	CUT	98	–	–	–	–	98
(Italy)	Francesco Molinari	550	105	CUT	111	–	–	–	–	–	–	111
(United States)	Keegan Bradley	545	106	T53	103	–	–	–	–	–	–	103
(United States)	Cameron Tringale	539	107	CUT	112	–	–	–	–	–	–	112
(United States)	Sean O'Hair	536	108	T2	15	T53	20	T52	25	208	T17	27
(United States)	Andrew Loupe*	535	109	CUT	113	–	–	–	–	–	–	113
(United States)	Boo Weekley	532	110	CUT	114	–	–	–	–	–	–	114
(United States)	John Huh	526	111	T31	90	T65	95	–	–	–	–	95
(United States)	Blayne Barber*	520	112	T41	101	–	–	–	–	–	–	101
(United States)	Mark Hubbard*	503	113	CUT	115	–	–	–	–	–	–	115
(United States)	Ben Crane	500	114	CUT	117	–	–	–	–	–	–	117
(United States)	Michael Kim*	500	115	CUT	118	–	–	–	–	–	–	118
(United States)	Kyle Stanley	497	116	T74	116	–	–	–	–	–	–	116
(India)	Anirban Lahiri*	494	117	DNP	119	–	–	–	–	–	–	119
(United States)	Derek Fathauer*	491	118	T31	99	CUT	100	–	–	–	–	100
(Canada)	Graham DeLaet	487	119	T78	120	–	–	–	–	–	–	120
(United States)	Troy Merritt	482	120	CUT	121	–	–	–	–	–	–	121
(United States)	Luke List*	481	121	CUT	122	–	–	–	–	–	–	122
(South Korea)	Kang Sung-hoon*	473	122	T18	88	CUT	96	–	–	–	–	96
(United States)	Shawn Stefani	459	123	T64	123	–	–	–	–	–	–	123
(United States)	David Toms	455	124	CUT	124	–	–	–	–	–	–	124
(South Korea)	Noh Seung-yul	454	125	CUT	125	–	–	–	–	–	–	125

* First-time Playoffs qualifier
