= 2016 Players Championship =

Tournament information
- Dates: May 12–15, 2016
- Location: Ponte Vedra Beach, Florida; 30.198°N 81.394°W
- Courses: TPC Sawgrass, Stadium Course
- Tour: PGA Tour

Statistics
- Par: 72
- Length: 7,215 yards (6,597 m)
- Field: 144 players, 76 after cut
- Cut: 142 (−2)
- Prize fund: $10.5 million
- Winner's share: $1.89 million

Champion
- (Australia) Jason Day
- 273 (−15)
- Location in the United States Location in Florida

The 2016 Players Championship was a golf tournament in Florida on the PGA Tour, held May 12–15 at TPC Sawgrass in Ponte Vedra Beach, southeast of Jacksonville. It was the 43rd Players Championship.

Jason Day, number one in the world rankings and reigning PGA Champion, led wire-to-wire to win his first Players, four strokes ahead of runner-up Kevin Chappell. With favorable scoring conditions early, Day was at 129 (−15) after 36 holes and then shot even par on the weekend.

Defending champion Rickie Fowler missed the 36-hole cut by a stroke.

== Venue ==
This was the 35th Players Championship held at the TPC at Sawgrass Stadium Course and it remained at 7,215 yards (6,597 m).

=== Course layout ===
The 2016 Players Championship
Tee	Rating/Slope	1	2	3	4	5	6	7	8	9	Out	10	11	12	13	14	15	16	17	18	In	Total
Yards	76.8 / 155	423	532	177	384	471	393	442	237	583	3,642	424	558	358	181	481	449	523	137	462	3,573	7,215
Par		4	5	3	4	4	4	4	3	5	36	4	5	4	3	4	4	5	3	4	36	72

== Field ==
The field consisted of 144 players meeting the following criteria:

1. Winners of PGA Tour events since last Players

Steven Bowditch (2), Jason Day (2,4,7,8,9,13), Jason Dufner (2,4), Tony Finau (2), Rickie Fowler (2,5,9), Fabián Gómez (2), Branden Grace (9), Emiliano Grillo (9), James Hahn (2), J. J. Henry (2), Jim Herman (2), Charley Hoffman (2,9), Zach Johnson (2,4,9), Smylie Kaufman (9), Chris Kirk (2), Kevin Kisner (2,9,13), Russell Knox (2,7,9,13), Danny Lee (2,9), David Lingmerth (2,8,9), Davis Love III (2), Shane Lowry (7,9), Peter Malnati, Hideki Matsuyama (2,9), Graeme McDowell, Rory McIlroy (2,4,7,9), Troy Merritt (2), Scott Piercy (2), Adam Scott (2,4,7,9,13), Brandt Snedeker (2,9,13), Jordan Spieth (2,4,6,9,13), Brian Stuard, Vaughn Taylor, Justin Thomas (2,9,13), Bubba Watson (2,4,7,9,13), Danny Willett (4,9)

- Charl Schwartzel (2,9) did not play.

2. Top 125 from previous season's FedEx Cup points list

Daniel Berger (9), Zac Blair, Jonas Blixt, Jason Bohn, Keegan Bradley (4), Scott Brown, Chad Campbell, Paul Casey (9), Alex Čejka, Kevin Chappell, Chad Collins, Erik Compton, Jon Curran, Brendon de Jonge, Graham DeLaet, Luke Donald, Ken Duke, Harris English, Matt Every (8), Jim Furyk (9), Sergio García (9), Andres Gonzales, Retief Goosen, Jason Gore, Bill Haas (9), Chesson Hadley, Adam Hadwin, Brian Harman, Pádraig Harrington, David Hearn, Russell Henley, Morgan Hoffmann, J. B. Holmes (9), Billy Horschel (6,9), Charles Howell III, John Huh, Dustin Johnson (7,9), Matt Jones, Jerry Kelly, Colt Knost, Brooks Koepka (9), Jason Kokrak, Matt Kuchar (5,9), Martin Laird, Marc Leishman (9), Spencer Levin, Hunter Mahan, Ben Martin, William McGirt, George McNeill, Phil Mickelson (4,9), Bryce Molder, Francesco Molinari, Ryan Moore (9), Kevin Na (9,13), Sean O'Hair, Louis Oosthuizen (9), Carlos Ortiz, Jeff Overton, Greg Owen, Ryan Palmer, Carl Pettersson, Scott Pinckney, Ian Poulter, Patrick Reed (7,9,13), Kyle Reifers, Justin Rose (4,9), John Senden, Vijay Singh, Brendan Steele, Shawn Stefani, Henrik Stenson (6,9), Robert Streb, Kevin Streelman, Chris Stroud, Daniel Summerhays, Hudson Swafford, Nick Taylor, Brendon Todd, Cameron Tringale, Camilo Villegas, Johnson Wagner, Jimmy Walker (9), Boo Weekley, Steve Wheatcroft, Will Wilcox, Mark Wilson, Gary Woodland

- Bae Sang-moon, Stewart Cink, Tim Clark, Ryo Ishikawa, Pat Perez, John Peterson, Rory Sabbatini, Webb Simpson (4), Nick Watney, and Lee Westwood (9) did not play.

3. Top 125 (medical)

Freddie Jacobson

4. Major champions from the past five years

Ernie Els, Martin Kaymer (5)

- Darren Clarke did not play.

5. Players Championship winners from the past five years

K. J. Choi

- Tiger Woods (7) did not play.

6. The Tour Championship winners from the past three years

7. World Golf Championship winners from the past three years

8. Memorial Tournament and Arnold Palmer Invitational winners since 2015

9. Top 50 from the Official World Golf Ranking

An Byeong-hun, Kiradech Aphibarnrat, Rafa Cabrera-Bello, Matt Fitzpatrick, Søren Kjeldsen, Andy Sullivan, Bernd Wiesberger

- Thongchai Jaidee and Kim Kyung-tae did not play.

10. Senior Players champion from prior year

Bernhard Langer

11. Web.com Tour money leader from prior season

Patton Kizzire

12. Money leader during the Web.com Tour Finals

Chez Reavie

13. Top 10 current year FedEx Cup points leaders

14. Remaining positions and alternates filled through current year FedEx Cup standings

Ricky Barnes, Kim Si-woo, Jamie Lovemark, Patrick Rodgers, Harold Varner III, Jhonattan Vegas

- These players were all in the first 73 places in the standings, as of May 2.
- Aaron Baddeley – replaced Webb Simpson

== Round summaries ==
=== First round ===
Thursday, May 12, 2016

Place	Player	Score	To par
1	(Australia) Jason Day	63	−9
T2	(United States) Bill Haas	65	−7
T2	(Republic of Ireland) Shane Lowry	65	−7
T2	(England) Justin Rose	65	−7
T2	(United States) Brendan Steele	65	−7
T2	(United States) Cameron Tringale	65	−7
T7	(United States) Daniel Berger	66	−6
T7	(South Africa) Ernie Els	66	−6
T7	(United States) Brooks Koepka	66	−6
T7	(Italy) Francesco Molinari	66	−6
T7	(United States) Hudson Swafford	66	−6
T7	(United States) Boo Weekley	66	−6

=== Second round ===
Friday, May 13, 2016
Saturday, May 14, 2016

A two-hour weather delay on Friday afternoon caused several players to suspend their rounds due to darkness. Among these was Day, who completed the final four holes of his second round on Saturday morning; play resumed at 9:15 a.m. EDT.

Place	Player	Score	To par
1	(Australia) Jason Day	63-66=129	−15
2	(Republic of Ireland) Shane Lowry	65-68=133	−11
T3	(Sweden) Jonas Blixt	67-67=134	−10
T3	(Germany) Alex Čejka	67-67=134	−10
T3	(United States) Cameron Tringale	65-69=134	−10
T6	(United States) Jerry Kelly	67-68=135	−9
T6	(United States) Colt Knost	72-63=135	−9
T6	(Scotland) Russell Knox	68-67=135	−9
T6	(Italy) Francesco Molinari	66-69=135	−9
T6	(United States) Boo Weekley	66-69=135	−9
T6	(United States) Gary Woodland	67-68=135	−9

=== Third round ===
Saturday, May 14, 2016

With the second round completed on Saturday morning, the third round was played in groupings of three from split tees. Scores were significantly higher than the first two rounds, as the course conditions toughened. Ken Duke shot 65 (−7) for the best round of the day and Hideki Matsuyama carded a 67; both joined Alex Čejka in a tie for second, four strokes behind Day, who recorded a one-over 73.

Place	Player	Score	To par
1	(Australia) Jason Day	63-66-73=202	−14
T2	(Germany) Alex Čejka	67-67-72=206	−10
T2	(United States) Ken Duke	74-67-65=206	−10
T2	(Japan) Hideki Matsuyama	68-71-67=206	−10
5	(Italy) Francesco Molinari	66-69-72=207	−9
T6	(United States) Kevin Chappell	71-67-70=208	−8
T6	(South Africa) Retief Goosen	70-68-70=208	−8
T8	(Sweden) Jonas Blixt	67-67-75=209	−7
T8	(United States) Colt Knost	72-63-74=209	−7
T8	(United States) Cameron Tringale	65-69-75=209	−7

=== Final round ===
Sunday, May 15, 2016

Champion
(c) = past champion

Place	Player	Score	To par	Money ($)
1	(Australia) Jason Day	63-66-73-71=273	−15	1,890,000
2	(United States) Kevin Chappell	71-67-70-69=277	−11	1,134,000
T3	(United States) Ken Duke	74-67-65-72=278	−10	504,000
T3	(United States) Colt Knost	72-63-74-69=278	−10	504,000
T3	(United States) Matt Kuchar (c)	71-67-72-68=278	−10	504,000
T3	(United States) Justin Thomas	70-68-75-65=278	−10	504,000
T7	(Japan) Hideki Matsuyama	68-71-67-73=279	−9	338,625
T7	(Italy) Francesco Molinari	66-69-72-72=279	−9	338,625
T9	(United States) Daniel Berger	66-72-73-69=280	−8	283,500
T9	(Germany) Alex Čejka	67-67-72-74=280	−8	283,500
T9	(Northern Ireland) Graeme McDowell	72-70-69-69=280	−8	283,500

Leaderboard below the top 10
Place	Player	Score	To par	Money ($)
T12	(South Africa) Retief Goosen	70-68-70-73=281	−7	212,625
T12	(Northern Ireland) Rory McIlroy	72-64-75-70=281	−7	212,625
T12	(United States) Bryce Molder	70-68-72-71=281	−7	212,625
T12	(Australia) Adam Scott (c)	73-65-75-68=281	−7	212,625
T16	(Republic of Ireland) Shane Lowry	65-68-78-71=282	−6	168,000
T16	(United States) Cameron Tringale	65-69-75-73=282	−6	168,000
T16	(United States) Boo Weekley	66-69-78-69=282	−6	168,000
T19	(Sweden) Jonas Blixt	67-67-75-74=283	−5	131,775
T19	(United States) Jerry Kelly	67-68-77-71=283	−5	131,775
T19	(Scotland) Russell Knox	68-67-80-68=283	−5	131,775
T19	(England) Justin Rose	65-74-78-66=283	−5	131,775
T23	(England) Paul Casey	68-72-76-68=284	−4	93,450
T23	(South Korea) Kim Si-woo	68-70-72-74=284	−4	93,450
T23	(United States) Ryan Palmer	67-70-75-72=284	−4	93,450
T23	(United States) Scott Piercy	70-68-75-71=284	−4	93,450
T23	(United States) Daniel Summerhays	69-71-71-73=284	−4	93,450
T28	(Canada) David Hearn	71-71-72-71=285	−3	68,325
T28	(United States) J. J. Henry	70-69-74-72=285	−3	68,325
T28	(United States) Billy Horschel	68-70-75-72=285	−3	68,325
T28	(United States) Dustin Johnson	70-70-77-68=285	−3	68,325
T28	(South Africa) Louis Oosthuizen	72-67-74-72=285	−3	68,325
T28	(Fiji) Vijay Singh	70-70-73-72=285	−3	68,325
T28	(United States) Gary Woodland	67-68-76-74=285	−3	68,325
T35	(United States) Keegan Bradley	72-67-76-71=286	−2	52,893
T35	(United States) Jim Furyk	71-70-75-70=286	−2	52,893
T35	(United States) Brooks Koepka	66-70-77-73=286	−2	52,893
T35	(New Zealand) Danny Lee	67-71-72-76=286	−2	52,893
T39	(United States) Chad Campbell	68-71-78-70=287	−1	44,100
T39	(United States) Jon Curran	70-71-79-67=287	−1	44,100
T39	(Canada) Adam Hadwin	70-70-74-73=287	−1	44,100
T39	(Germany) Martin Kaymer (c)	68-72-76-71=287	−1	44,100
T43	(South Korea) K. J. Choi (c)	73-68-73-74=288	E	33,670
T43	(United States) Bill Haas	65-73-77-73=288	E	33,670
T43	(United States) James Hahn	67-73-79-69=288	E	33,670
T43	(Denmark) Søren Kjeldsen	72-70-74-72=288	E	33,670
T43	(United States) William McGirt	72-65-76-75=288	E	33,670
T43	(United States) Bubba Watson	69-71-74-74=288	E	33,670
T49	(United States) Zac Blair	71-70-73-75=289	+1	25,914
T49	(United States) Jason Dufner	70-66-80-73=289	+1	25,914
T49	(United States) Morgan Hoffmann	69-73-75-72=289	+1	25,914
T49	(Sweden) Freddie Jacobson	70-69-78-72=289	+1	25,914
T49	(Austria) Bernd Wiesberger	71-67-78-73=289	+1	25,914
T54	(Spain) Sergio García (c)	72-66-77-75=290	+2	24,150
T54	(United States) Brian Harman	69-70-77-74=290	+2	24,150
T54	(United States) Zach Johnson	67-69-80-74=290	+2	24,150
T57	(Zimbabwe) Brendon de Jonge	71-67-76-77=291	+3	23,100
T57	(South Africa) Branden Grace	72-70-78-71=291	+3	23,100
T57	(England) Ian Poulter	69-68-79-75=291	+3	23,100
T57	(United States) Brendan Steele	65-76-74-76=291	+3	23,100
T57	(United States) Hudson Swafford	66-73-77-75=291	+3	23,100
T57	(United States) Harold Varner III	73-66-78-74=291	+3	23,100
T57	(Venezuela) Jhonattan Vegas	67-71-79-74=291	+3	23,100
T64	(South Africa) Ernie Els	66-73-78-75=292	+4	21,735
T64	(Australia) Marc Leishman	70-72-75-75=292	+4	21,735
T64	(United States) Jamie Lovemark	71-71-79-71=292	+4	21,735
T64	(United States) Sean O'Hair	70-67-76-79=292	+4	21,735
T64	(United States) Kyle Reifers	71-70-76-75=292	+4	21,735
T64	(United States) Johnson Wagner	70-71-77-74=292	+4	21,735
70	(Colombia) Camilo Villegas	71-71-78-73=293	+5	21,000
71	(United States) Steve Wheatcroft	68-74-79-73=294	+6	20,790
T72	(United States) Shawn Stefani	74-68-80-73=295	+7	20,475
T72	(United States) Will Wilcox	68-71-82-74=295	+7	20,475
T74	(Argentina) Fabián Gómez	73-69-79-75=296	+8	20,055
T74	(United States) Kevin Streelman	72-70-80-74=296	+8	20,055
76	(United States) Patton Kizzire	71-70-82-77=300	+12	19,740
CUT	(South Korea) An Byeong-hun	75-68=143	−1	
CUT	(Spain) Rafa Cabrera-Bello	72-71=143	−1	
CUT	(England) Matt Fitzpatrick	69-74=143	−1	
CUT	(United States) Rickie Fowler (c)	72-71=143	−1	
CUT	(United States) Charley Hoffman	73-70=143	−1	
CUT	(United States) J. B. Holmes	70-73=143	−1	
CUT	(Sweden) David Lingmerth	71-72=143	−1	
CUT	(United States) Davis Love III (c)	71-72=143	−1	
CUT	(United States) George McNeill	70-73=143	−1	
CUT	(United States) Phil Mickelson (c)	70-73=143	−1	
CUT	(United States) Kevin Na	73-70=143	−1	
CUT	(Sweden) Carl Pettersson	68-75=143	−1	
CUT	(United States) Patrick Reed	71-72=143	−1	
CUT	(United States) Jordan Spieth	72-71=143	−1	
CUT	(United States) Vaughn Taylor	71-72=143	−1	
CUT	(England) Danny Willett	70-73=143	−1	
CUT	(Thailand) Kiradech Aphibarnrat	75-69=144	E	
CUT	(Australia) Aaron Baddeley	69-75=144	E	
CUT	(England) Luke Donald	70-74=144	E	
CUT	(Scotland) Martin Laird	71-73=144	E	
CUT	(Germany) Bernhard Langer	72-72=144	E	
CUT	(England) Greg Owen	69-75=144	E	
CUT	(United States) Chez Reavie	73-71=144	E	
CUT	(Australia) John Senden	75-69=144	E	
CUT	(United States) Brian Stuard	71-73=144	E	
CUT	(United States) Scott Brown	73-72=145	+1	
CUT	(United States) Harris English	75-70=145	+1	
CUT	(United States) Andres Gonzales	75-70=145	+1	
CUT	(United States) Kevin Kisner	74-71=145	+1	
CUT	(United States) Ryan Moore	70-75=145	+1	
CUT	(United States) Robert Streb	71-74=145	+1	
CUT	(United States) Brendon Todd	73-72=145	+1	
CUT	(United States) Mark Wilson	74-71=145	+1	
CUT	(United States) Ricky Barnes	72-74=146	+2	
CUT	(Argentina) Emiliano Grillo	71-75=146	+2	
CUT	(Republic of Ireland) Pádraig Harrington	72-74=146	+2	
CUT	(United States) Hunter Mahan	77-69=146	+2	
CUT	(United States) Jeff Overton	73-73=146	+2	
CUT	(Canada) Nick Taylor	67-79=146	+2	
CUT	(Canada) Graham DeLaet	70-77=147	+3	
CUT	(United States) Tony Finau	72-75=147	+3	
CUT	(United States) Jason Gore	72-75=147	+3	
CUT	(United States) Russell Henley	74-73=147	+3	
CUT	(United States) Charles Howell III	72-75=147	+3	
CUT	(United States) Smylie Kaufman	72-75=147	+3	
CUT	(United States) Spencer Levin	76-71=147	+3	
CUT	(United States) Troy Merritt	73-74=147	+3	
CUT	(United States) Scott Pinckney	74-73=147	+3	
CUT	(United States) Patrick Rodgers	73-74=147	+3	
CUT	(United States) Brandt Snedeker	71-76=147	+3	
CUT	(United States) Chad Collins	75-73=148	+4	
CUT	(United States) Erik Compton	77-71=148	+4	
CUT	(United States) Chesson Hadley	78-70=148	+4	
CUT	(Mexico) Carlos Ortiz	77-72=149	+5	
CUT	(Sweden) Henrik Stenson (c)	77-73=150	+6	
CUT	(England) Andy Sullivan	77-73=150	+6	
CUT	(United States) Jason Bohn	74-77=151	+7	
CUT	(United States) Matt Every	73-78=151	+7	
CUT	(United States) Jim Herman	75-76=151	+7	
CUT	(United States) Peter Malnati	77-74=151	+7	
CUT	(Australia) Matt Jones	78-74=152	+8	
CUT	(United States) Ben Martin	75-77=152	+8	
CUT	(Australia) Steven Bowditch	80-73=153	+9	
CUT	(United States) John Huh	77-76=153	+9	
CUT	(United States) Jimmy Walker	71-82=153	+9	
WD	(United States) Chris Kirk	73	+1	
WD	(United States) Jason Kokrak	73	+1	
WD	(United States) Chris Stroud	75	+3	

==== Scorecard ====
Final round

Hole	1	2	3	4	5	6	7	8	9	10	11	12	13	14	15	16	17	18
Par	4	5	3	4	4	4	4	3	5	4	5	4	3	4	4	5	3	4
(Australia) Day	−14	−14	−14	−14	−14	−13	−13	−13	−12	−13	−13	−14	−14	−14	−14	−15	−15	−15
(United States) Chappell	−9	−9	−8	−7	−7	−7	−6	−6	−7	−7	−9	−9	−9	−9	−9	−10	−11	−11
(United States) Duke	−9	−10	−10	−10	−11	−11	−11	−10	−10	−9	−10	−10	−10	−10	−9	−10	−10	−10
(United States) Knost	−7	−8	−8	−8	−6	−6	−7	−8	−9	−9	−9	−10	−9	−10	−10	−10	−10	−10
(United States) Kuchar	−6	−7	−7	−7	−6	−7	−7	−7	−8	−8	−8	−9	−9	−9	−9	−10	−10	−10
(United States) Thomas	−4	−5	−5	−5	−5	−6	−6	−7	−7	−7	−8	−8	−7	−8	−8	−9	−9	−10
(Japan) Matsuyama	−9	−9	−7	−7	−7	−8	−8	−8	−8	−8	−8	−8	−9	−8	−8	−9	−9	−9
(Italy) Molinari	−9	−10	−9	−9	−9	−8	−8	−8	−9	−9	−9	−10	−10	−8	−8	−9	−9	−9

Cumulative tournament scores, relative to par

Eagle	Birdie	Bogey	Double bogey
