= 2015 Web.com Tour Finals graduates =

lThis is a list of golf players who graduated from the Web.com Tour Finals in 2015. The top 25 players on the Web.com Tour's regular season money list in 2015 earned their PGA Tour card for 2016. The Finals determined the other 25 players to earn their PGA Tour cards and their priority order.

As in previous seasons, the Finals featured the top-75 players on the Web.com Tour's regular season money list, players ranked 126–200 on the PGA Tour's FedEx Cup regular season points list (except players exempt through other means), non-members of the PGA Tour with enough FedEx Cup regular season points to place 126–200, and special medical exemptions.

To determine the initial 2016 PGA Tour priority rank, the top 25 Web.com Tour's regular season players were alternated with the top 25 Web.com Tour Finals players. This priority order was then reshuffled several times during the 2016 season.

Patton Kizzire (Finals and regular season combined earnings) and Chez Reavie (Finals earnings) were fully exempt for the 2015–16 season and received invitations to The Players Championship. Patrick Rodgers was also fully exempt on the PGA Tour after earning enough FedEx Cup points as a PGA Tour non-member.

== 2015 Web.com Tour ==
Player	2015 Web.com Tour regular season		2015 FedEx Cup	2015 Web.com Tour Finals				The 25 Regular + Finals		Priority rank
Player	Rank	Earnings ($)	2015 FedEx Cup	Rank	Without The 25	Earnings ($)	Best finish	Rank	Earnings ($)	Priority rank
(United States) Patrick Rodgers^{†}	24	162,070		n/a		0	DNP	25	162,070	Exempt
(United States) Chez Reavie			166	1	1	323,067	Win			Exempt
(United States) Patton Kizzire*	1	518,241		23		49,625	T5	1	567,866	Exempt
(South Africa) Dawie van der Walt*	3	298,235		16		70,005	T5	2	368,240	1
(Argentina) Emiliano Grillo*				2	2	283,667	Win			2
(United States) Martin Piller	2	343,649		T96		6,360	T30	3	350,009	3
(Sweden) Henrik Norlander	47	104,119		3	3	215,743	Win			4
(United States) Jamie Lovemark	12	191,966		7		114,179	T2	4	306,145	5
(United States) Andrew Loupe	130	25,067	198	4	4	195,405	Win			6
(United States) Peter Malnati	4	282,408		53		23,000	T10	5	305,408	7
(United States) Roberto Castro	177	6,381	188	5	5	130,785	T2			8
(South Korea) Lee Dong-hwan	15	188,767		9		92,300	T2	6	281,067	9
(United States) Sam Saunders			137	6	6	114,950	3			10
(United States) Smylie Kaufman*	6	248,088		44		26,410	T10	7	274,498	11
(United States) Michael Thompson			146	8	7	94,830	T2			12
(United States) Bronson Burgoon*	18	185,927		12		83,753	T2	8	269,680	13
(United States) Tom Hoge	237	1,604	132	11	8	85,119	T2			14
(United States) Steve Marino	19	180,995		10		87,843	T2	9	268,838	15
(United States) Brett Stegmaier*	69	80,547		13	9	83,600	5			16
(United States) Dicky Pride	5	253,057	230	105		4,910	T64	10	257,967	17
(Australia) Rhein Gibson*	33	128,953		14	10	81,943	4			18
(United States) Kelly Kraft^{†}	7	242,333		69		14,554	T29	11	256,887	19
(United States) Kyle Stanley	111	36,717	181	15	11	81,875	T5			20
(South Korea) Kim Si-woo*	10	225,268		36		31,219	T16	12	256,487	21
(Japan) Hiroshi Iwata*				17	12	60,000	T4			22
(United States) Wes Roach	8	241,133		T113		2,900	T48	13	244,033	23
(United States) Ricky Barnes			155	18	13	59,255	6			24
(United States) Shane Bertsch	9	240,369		123		2,420	69	14	242,789	25
(United States) Lucas Glover			147	19	14	57,991	T9			26
(United States) Tyler Aldridge	14	189,671		59		17,460	T16	15	207,131	27
(United States) Derek Fathauer			169	20	15	52,000	9			28
(Mexico) Abraham Ancer*	11	201,819		n/a		0	CUT	16	201,819	29
(India) Anirban Lahiri^{†}				21	16	49,750	T6			30
(United States) Harold Varner III*	25	161,102		29		38,402	T16	17	199,504	31
(South Africa) Tyrone van Aswegen	175	6,876	191	22	17	49,637	T5			32
(United States) Michael Kim*	13	190,243		82		8,960	T29	18	199,203	33
(United States) Mark Hubbard			164	24	18	43,381	T5			34
(Argentina) Miguel Ángel Carballo	16	188,111		78		10,618	T30	19	198,729	35
(United States) Robert Garrigus			174	25	19	42,143	T9			36
(Australia) Rod Pampling	17	186,632	192	77		10,862	T24	20	197,494	37
(New Zealand) Tim Wilkinson			184	26	20	41,897	T9			38
(United States) Darron Stiles	20	180,015		116		2,710	55	21	182,725	39
(United States) Derek Ernst			170	27	21	41,729	T5			40
(South Korea) Kang Sung-hoon	22	168,971		80		9,471	T37	22	178,442	41
(United States) Luke List	64	84,403		28	22	39,888	T5			42
(United States) Andrew Landry*	21	171,792		108		4,590	T74	23	176,382	43
(South Africa) Thomas Aiken*				30	23	35,125	T5			44
(Brazil) Lucas Lee*	23	164,046		n/a		0	WD	24	164,046	45
(England) Brian Davis			143	31	24	32,607	T16			46
(United States) Rob Oppenheim*	26	160,159		32	25	32,206	T12			47

- *PGA Tour rookie in 2016
- ^{†}First-time PGA Tour member in 2016, but ineligible for rookie status due to having played eight or more Tour events in a previous season
- Earned spot in Finals through PGA Tour.
- Earned spot in Finals through FedEx Cup points earned as a PGA Tour non-member.
- Indicates whether the player earned his card through the regular season or through the Finals.

Note: Kim Si-woo had previously been a PGA Tour member in the 2013 season, but did not play ten events and retained his rookie status.

== Results on 2015–16 PGA Tour ==
Player	Starts	Cuts made	Best finish	Money list rank	Earnings ($)	FedEx Cup rank
(United States) Patrick Rodgers^{†}	28	17	T3	84	1,290,336	74
(United States) Chez Reavie	27	18	7/T7	95	1,086,964	81
(United States) Patton Kizzire*	27	20	T2	72	1,468,624	82
(South Africa) Dawie van der Walt*	25	11	T17	177	301,697	171
(Argentina) Emiliano Grillo*	24	21	Win	23	3,153,085	9
(United States) Martin Piller	22	8	T4	144	570,470	162
(Sweden) Henrik Norlander	21	15	T25	179	290,889	164
(United States) Jamie Lovemark	27	19	T2	48	1,940,890	49
(United States) Andrew Loupe	27	11	T3	99	1,075,276	113
(United States) Peter Malnati	32	11	Win	83	1,298,945	104
(United States) Roberto Castro	26	21	2	38	2,353,974	21
(South Korea) Lee Dong-hwan	22	8	12	195	174,683	201
(United States) Sam Saunders	24	10	T8	151	510,079	148
(United States) Smylie Kaufman*	28	18	Win	34	2,508,174	43
(United States) Michael Thompson	23	13	T4	148	521,983	145
(United States) Bronson Burgoon*	27	16	T14	147	557,020	131
(United States) Tom Hoge	26	14	T9x2	145	561,559	144
(United States) Steve Marino	24	13	2	120	768,200	130
(United States) Brett Stegmaier*	29	11	T2	96	1,086,714	108
(United States) Dicky Pride	21	7	T33	205	101,456	206
(Australia) Rhein Gibson*	20	9	T25	199	155,578	199
(United States) Kelly Kraft^{†}	20	12	T5	166	403,437	165
(United States) Kyle Stanley	28	18	T13	142	580,734	116
(South Korea) Kim Si-woo*	33	22	Win	28	2,867,749	18
(Japan) Hiroshi Iwata*	29	14	T4	137	634,862	146
(United States) Wes Roach	21	9	T13	172	342,098	170
(United States) Ricky Barnes	29	20	T4	92	1,158,800	71
(United States) Shane Bertsch	9	6	T35	204	105,492	204
(United States) Lucas Glover	23	15	8	110	948,927	106
(United States) Tyler Aldridge	28	14	T12	150	517,738	140
(United States) Derek Fathauer	30	19	4	115	898,430	100
(Mexico) Abraham Ancer*	19	6	T18	197	162,811	190
(India) Anirban Lahiri^{†}	21	16	T6	116	835,171	119
(United States) Harold Varner III*	28	18	T5	81	1,327,320	75
(South Africa) Tyrone van Aswegen	29	22	T3	103	1,025,632	104
(United States) Michael Kim*	29	22	T11	133	664,539	118
(United States) Mark Hubbard	30	21	T15	136	642,942	115
(Argentina) Miguel Ángel Carballo	18	7	T9	186	240,509	187
(United States) Robert Garrigus	21	14	T4	104	1,024,900	109
(Australia) Rod Pampling	18	9	T26	201	142,433	195
(New Zealand) Tim Wilkinson	22	14	T4	127	708,623	132
(United States) Darron Stiles	17	4	T20	216	60,197	217
(United States) Derek Ernst	20	10	T20	192	190,736	186
(South Korea) Kang Sung-hoon	29	16	T8	109	979,576	96
(United States) Luke List	27	12	T6	122	751,001	122
(United States) Andrew Landry*	18	9	T8	169	373,980	178
(South Africa) Thomas Aiken*	23	12	T15	171	347,686	166
(Brazil) Lucas Lee*	16	6	T36	206	98,965	203
(England) Brian Davis	9	1	T28	228	27,880	230
(United States) Rob Oppenheim*	21	13	T10	156	462,427	158

- *PGA Tour rookie in 2016
- ^{†}First-time PGA Tour member in 2016, but ineligible for rookie status due to having played eight or more Tour events in a previous season
- Retained his PGA Tour card for 2017: won or finished in the top 125 of the money list or FedEx Cup points list.
- Retained PGA Tour conditional status and qualified for the Web.com Tour Finals: finished between 126 and 150 on FedEx Cup list and qualified for Web.com Tour Finals.
- Failed to retain his PGA Tour card for 2017 but qualified for the Web.com Tour Finals: finished between 150 and 200 on FedEx Cup list.
- Failed to retain his PGA Tour card for 2017 and to qualify for the Web.com Tour Finals: finished outside the top 200 on FedEx Cup list.

Miguel Ángel Carballo, Kelly Kraft, Rod Pampling, Michael Thompson, and Tim Wilkinson regained their cards through the 2016 Web.com Tour Finals.

== Winners on the PGA Tour in 2016 ==
No.	Date	Player	Tournament	Winning score	Margin of victory	Runners-up	Payout ($)
1	Oct 18, 2015	(Argentina) Emiliano Grillo	Frys.com Open	−15 (68-71-65-69=273)	Playoff	(United States) Kevin Na	1,080,000
2	Oct 25, 2015	(United States) Smylie Kaufman	Shriners Hospitals for Children Open	−16 (67-72-68-61=268)	1 stroke	(United States) Jason Bohn, (Germany) Alex Čejka (United States) Patton Kizzire, (United States) Kevin Na (United States) Brett Stegmaier, (United States) Cameron Tringale	1,152,000
3	Nov 9, 2015	(United States) Peter Malnati	Sanderson Farms Championship	−18 (69-66-68-67=270)	1 stroke	(United States) William McGirt, (United States) David Toms	738,000
4	Aug 22, 2016	(South Korea) Kim Si-woo	Wyndham Championship	−21 (68-60-68-67=259)	5 strokes	(England) Luke Donald	1,008,000

== Runners-up on the PGA Tour in 2016 ==
No.	Date	Player	Tournament	Winner	Winning score	Runner-up score	Payout ($)
1&2	Oct 25, 2015	(United States) Patton Kizzire	Shriners Hospitals for Children Open	(United States) Smylie Kaufman	−16 (67-72-68-61=268)	−15 (65-69-72-63=269)	355,733
1&2	Oct 25, 2015	(United States) Brett Stegmaier	Shriners Hospitals for Children Open	(United States) Smylie Kaufman	−16 (67-72-68-61=268)	−15 (66-66-68-69=269)	355,733
3	Mar 27, 2016	(United States) Steve Marino; Lost in playoff	Puerto Rico Open	(United States) Tony Finau	−12 (69-70-67-70=276)	−12 (70-67-69-70=276)	324,000
4	May 2	(United States) Jamie Lovemark; Lost in three-man playoff	Zurich Classic of New Orleans	(United States) Brian Stuard	−15 (64-68-69=201*)	−15 (67-66-68=201*)	616,000
5	May 8	(United States) Roberto Castro; Lost in playoff	Wells Fargo Championship	(United States) James Hahn	−9 (70-71-68-70=279)	−9 (71-66-71-71=279)	788,000
6	Jul 17	(South Korea) Kim Si-woo; Lost in playoff	Barbasol Championship	(Australia) Aaron Baddeley	−18 (70-66-64-66=266)	−18 (70-68-65-63=266)	378,000
7	Aug 28	(Argentina) Emiliano Grillo	The Barclays	(United States) Patrick Reed	−9 (66-68-71-70=275)	−8 (67-69-71-69=276)	748,000

*Shortened to 54 holes due to poor weather conditions.
