= Shane Bertsch =

American professional golfer

Personal information
- Full name: Shane Thomas Bertsch
- Nationality: United States
- Born: March 30, 1970 (age 56) Denver, Colorado, U.S.
- Height: 6 ft 2 in (1.88 m)
- Weight: 185 lb (84 kg)

Career
- Sport: Golf
- College: Texas A&M University
- Turned professional: 1994
- Current tour: PGA Tour Champions
- Former tours: Web.com Tour; PGA Tour
- Professional wins: 7

Number of wins by tour
- Korn Ferry Tour: 3
- PGA Tour Champions: 1
- Other: 3

Best results in major championships
- Masters Tournament: DNP
- PGA Championship: DNP
- U.S. Open: CUT: 1998, 2012
- The Open Championship: DNP

Shane Thomas Bertsch (born March 30, 1970) is an American professional golfer who has played on the PGA Tour.

== Early life ==
Bertsch was born in Denver, Colorado.

== Professional career ==
In 1994, Bertsch turned professional. Bertsch has won twice on the Nationwide Tour, once in 2000 and once in 2005. His best PGA Tour finish was a tie for fifth at the 1996 Greater Vancouver Open.

Bertsch was once a top-tier tennis player, but gave up the game for good after losing to future world number-one Andre Agassi in 1994.

Bertsch barely missed retaining full tour privileges for 2009, finished 126th on the money list. He secured a tour card for 2010 by finishing 15th in qualifying school.

In August 2020, Bertsch won in his second PGA Tour Champions start. He beat Glen Day, Bernhard Langer and Kenny Perry with an eagle at the first sudden-death playoff hole.

== Professional wins (8) ==
=== Web.com Tour wins (3) ===
No.	Date	Tournament	Winning score	Margin of victory	Runner(s)-up
1	Jul 16, 2000	Buy.com Upstate Classic	−19 (69-68-64-68=269)	4 strokes	(United States) Tim Straub
2	May 1, 2005	BMW Charity Pro-Am (2)	−12 (69-68-65=202) (Note: Shortened to 54 holes due to weather.)	2 strokes	(United States) Charley Hoffman, (United States) Bubba Watson
3	Jun 1, 2015	Rust-Oleum Championship	−18 (67-65-68-66=266)	1 stroke	(Brazil) Lucas Lee

Web.com Tour playoff record (0–2)

No.	Year	Tournament	Opponent(s)	Result
1	2004	Knoxville Open	(United States) Justin Bolli, (United States) Hunter Haas	Haas won with birdie on first extra hole
2	2005	Preferred Health Systems Wichita Open	(United States) Joe Daley	Lost to birdie on first extra hole

=== Other wins (3) ===
- 1994 Southwest Kansas Pro-Am
- 1998 Colorado Open
- 2020 Westminster Senior Open

=== PGA Tour Champions wins (1) ===
No.	Date	Tournament	Winning score	Margin of victory	Runners-up
1	Aug 21, 2020	Charles Schwab Series at Bass Pro Shops Big Cedar Lodge	−13 (64-64-72=200)	Playoff	(United States) Glen Day, (Germany) Bernhard Langer, (United States) Kenny Perry

PGA Tour Champions playoff record (1–0)

No.	Year	Tournament	Opponents	Result
1	2020	Charles Schwab Series at Bass Pro Shops Big Cedar Lodge	(United States) Glen Day, (Germany) Bernhard Langer, (United States) Kenny Perry	Won with eagle on first extra hole

== Results in major championships ==
Tournament	1998	1999	2000	2001	2002	2003	2004	2005	2006	2007	2008	2009	2010	2011	2012
U.S. Open	CUT														CUT

Did not play

CUT = missed the half-way cut
Note: Bertsch only played in the U.S. Open.

== Results in The Players Championship ==
Tournament	2007
The Players Championship	CUT

CUT = missed the half-way cut

== See also ==
- 1995 PGA Tour Qualifying School graduates
- 1996 PGA Tour Qualifying School graduates
- 2005 Nationwide Tour graduates
- 2009 PGA Tour Qualifying School graduates
- 2015 Web.com Tour Finals graduates
