= Wes Roach =

American professional golfer

Personal information
- Full name: Wesley Alexander Roach
- Nationality: United States
- Born: December 10, 1988 (age 37) Knoxville, Tennessee, U.S.
- Height: 6 ft 3 in (1.91 m)
- Weight: 185 lb (84 kg; 13.2 st)

Career
- Sport: Golf
- College: Duke University
- Turned professional: 2011
- Current tour: Korn Ferry Tour
- Former tour: PGA Tour
- Professional wins: 1

Number of wins by tour
- Korn Ferry Tour: 1

Wesley Alexander Roach (born December 10, 1988) is an American professional golfer.

== Early life and amateur career ==
Roach was born in Knoxville, Tennessee. He played college golf at Duke University. He graduated in 2011.

== Professional career ==
In 2011, turned professional. Roach played on the Web.com Tour in 2012 and 2013, finishing 22nd on the money list in 2013 to earn his PGA Tour card for 2014. On the PGA Tour, he made 11 of 22 cuts in 2014 with a best finish of T-4 at the Puerto Rico Open. He finished 153rd on the FedEx Cup points list and lost his PGA Tour card and returned to the Web.com Tour in 2015. He won his first Web.com Tour event at the 2015 El Bosque Mexico Championship.

== Professional wins (1) ==
=== Web.com Tour wins (1) ===
No.	Date	Tournament	Winning score	Margin of victory	Runners-up
1	Apr 19, 2015	El Bosque Mexico Championship	−17 (67-71-65-68=268)	4 strokes	(United States) Patton Kizzire, (United States) Kevin Tway

Web.com Tour playoff record (0–1)

No.	Year	Tournament	Opponents	Result
1	2015	Stonebrae Classic	(South Korea) Kim Si-woo, (United States) Jamie Lovemark	Kim won with birdie on first extra hole

== See also ==
- 2013 Web.com Tour Finals graduates
- 2015 Web.com Tour Finals graduates
- 2018 Web.com Tour Finals graduates
