= Smylie Kaufman =

American professional golfer (born 1991)

Personal information
- Full name: Carter Smylie Kaufman
- Nationality: United States
- Born: November 30, 1991 (age 34) Birmingham, Alabama. U.S.
- Height: 6 ft 1 in (1.85 m)
- Weight: 170 lb (77 kg; 12 st)

Career
- Sport: Golf
- College: Louisiana State University
- Turned professional: 2014
- Current tours: PGA Tour (past champion status); Korn Ferry Tour
- Professional wins: 2
- Highest ranking: 48 (March 20, 2016)

Number of wins by tour
- PGA Tour: 1
- Korn Ferry Tour: 1

Best results in major championships
- Masters Tournament: T29: 2016
- PGA Championship: CUT: 2016
- U.S. Open: CUT: 2014, 2016
- The Open Championship: CUT: 2016

Carter Smylie Kaufman (born November 30, 1991) is an American professional golfer and sports commentator who played on the PGA Tour.

== Early life and amateur career ==
Kaufman was born in Birmingham, Alabama. He attended Vestavia Hills High School. His middle name is a tribute to his grandmother's cousin, Smylie Gebhart, who was an All-American defensive end for Georgia Tech in 1971. His grandfather, Alan Kaufman, was head coach of the men's golf team at the University of Alabama at Birmingham.

Kaufman played college golf at Louisiana State University. He graduated in 2014.

== Professional career ==
He turned professional after graduating in 2014; in December 2014 he tied for 67th place at the Web.com Tour Qualifying School final stage.

Kaufman played on the Web.com Tour in 2015. After missing the cut in his first three tournaments, he finished T-4 in the next two and won the third, the United Leasing Championship to claim his first professional title. He finished the year sixth on the money list to earn his card for the 2016 PGA Tour season.

On October 25, 2015, Kaufman earned his first victory on the PGA Tour by winning the Shriners Hospitals for Children Open by a single stroke over six players. In the final round, he came from seven strokes back after a round of 61, that included eight birdies and an eagle, to claim his maiden victory. This earned him a place into the 2016 Masters Tournament and 2016 PGA Championship.

At the 2016 Masters Tournament, Kaufman shot a 69 during the third round, which was the best of the day in tough scoring conditions. As a result, he played in the last group during the final round, alongside defending champion Jordan Spieth. He endured a tough final round and shot a nine-over-par 81 for a T29 placing.

== Amateur wins ==
- 2011 Alabama Amateur

== Professional wins (2) ==
=== PGA Tour wins (1) ===
No.	Date	Tournament	Winning score	Margin of victory	Runners-up
1	Oct 25, 2015	Shriners Hospitals for Children Open	−16 (67-72-68-61=268)	1 stroke	(United States) Jason Bohn, (Germany) Alex Čejka, (United States) Patton Kizzire, (United States) Kevin Na, (United States) Brett Stegmaier, (United States) Cameron Tringale

=== Web.com Tour wins (1) ===
No.	Date	Tournament	Winning score	Margin of victory	Runners-up
1	May 3, 2015	United Leasing Championship	−10 (72-69-64-73=278)	5 strokes	(United States) Adam Long, (United States) Jonathan Randolph, (United States) Ryan Spears

== Results in major championships ==
Tournament	2014	2015	2016
Masters Tournament			T29
U.S. Open	CUT		CUT
The Open Championship			CUT
PGA Championship			CUT

Did not play

CUT = missed the half-way cut
"T" = tied

== Results in The Players Championship ==
Tournament	2016	2017
The Players Championship	CUT	T12

CUT = missed the halfway cut
"T" indicates a tie for a place

== Results in World Golf Championships ==
Tournament	2016
Championship	T8
Match Play	T61
Invitational	T27
Champions	

Top 10
Did not play

"T" = Tied

== See also ==
- 2015 Web.com Tour Finals graduates
