= Kelly Kraft =

American professional golfer (born 1988)

Personal information
- Full name: Kelly James Kraft
- Nationality: United States
- Born: October 5, 1988 (age 38) Denton, Texas, U.S.
- Height: 6 ft 0 in (1.83 m)

Career
- Sport: Golf
- College: Southern Methodist University
- Turned professional: 2012
- Former tours: PGA Tour; Web.com Tour
- Professional wins: 1

Number of wins by tour
- Korn Ferry Tour: 1

Best results in major championships
- Masters Tournament: 62nd: 2012
- PGA Championship: T48: 2019
- U.S. Open: DNP
- The Open Championship: CUT: 2018

Kelly James Kraft (born October 5, 1988) is an American professional golfer who played on the PGA Tour.

== Amateur career ==
Kraft was born in Denton, Texas. During his final year at Billy Ryan High School, 2006–07, Kraft served as team captain while earning All-District honors.

While attending Southern Methodist University (SMU), he played college golf for the SMU Mustangs.

Kraft won the 2011 Trans-Mississippi Amateur in July. He then won the 2011 U.S. Amateur in August, beating world-number-one Patrick Cantlay in the final, 2 up. The win earned Kraft a spot in the Masters Tournament, U.S. Open, and Open Championship in 2012. In September 2011, Kraft played on the 2011 Walker Cup team. In November 2011, Kraft finished as top amateur at the Emirates Australian Open, finishing in a tie for 19th.

== Professional career ==
Kraft turned professional after competing in the 2012 Masters Tournament. In doing so, he forfeited his invitations to the 2012 U.S. Open and 2012 Open Championship. Kraft played in eight tournaments on the PGA Tour in 2012 through sponsor exemptions. He played on the Web.com Tour from 2013–2015 with a best finish of second at the 2013 Mylan Classic until his first win on March 15, 2015 at the Chitimacha Louisiana Open.

Kraft has three solo second place finishes on the PGA Tour: one in February 2017 at the AT&T Pebble Beach Pro-Am, finishing at –15, four strokes behind the winner Jordan Spieth, the next in July 2018 at A Military Tribute at The Greenbrier finishing at −14, five strokes behind Kevin Na and the last in July 2019 at the Barbasol Championship finishing at −25, one stroke behind Jim Herman.

== Personal life ==
In April 2013, Kraft and Tia Gannon were married in Sea Island, Georgia.

Kraft retired from golf in 2025 and became a technology investor. He joined Disruptive, a late-stage investment firm.

== Amateur wins ==
- 2008 Texas Amateur
- 2011 Texas Amateur, Trans-Mississippi Amateur, U.S. Amateur, South Beach International Amateur

== Professional wins (1) ==
=== Web.com Tour wins (1) ===
No.	Date	Tournament	Winning score	To par	Margin of victory	Runner-up
1	Mar 29, 2015	Chitimacha Louisiana Open	67-70-68-65=270	−14	1 stroke	(South Korea) Lee Dong-hwan

== Results in major championships ==
Tournament	2012	2013	2014	2015	2016	2017	2018
Masters Tournament	62						
U.S. Open							
The Open Championship							CUT
PGA Championship						T58	CUT

Tournament	2019
Masters Tournament	
PGA Championship	T48
U.S. Open	
The Open Championship	

Did not play

CUT = missed the half-way cut
"T" = tied for place

== Results in The Players Championship ==
Tournament	2018	2019	2020	2021	2022	2023
The Players Championship	CUT	T47	C			CUT

Did not play

CUT = missed the halfway cut
"T" indicates a tie for a place
C = Canceled after the first round due to the COVID-19 pandemic

== U.S. national team appearances ==
- Walker Cup: 2011

== See also ==
- 2015 Web.com Tour Finals graduates
- 2016 Web.com Tour Finals graduates
- 2021 Korn Ferry Tour Finals graduates
