= Ellie Mae Classic =

Tournament information
- Location: Hayward, California
- Established: 2009
- Course: TPC Stonebrae
- Par: 70
- Length: 7,024 yards (6,423 m)
- Tour: Korn Ferry Tour
- Format: Stroke play
- Prize fund: US$600,000
- Month played: August
- Final year: 2019

Tournament record score
- Aggregate: 250 Stephan Jäger (2016)
- To par: −30 as above

Final champion
- (United States) Zac Blair
- Location in the United States Location in California

The Ellie Mae Classic was a golf tournament on the Korn Ferry Tour. It was first played in 2009 at TPC Stonebrae (previously known as Stonebrae Country Club), in Hayward, California.

== History ==
The inaugural event had a prize fund of $600,000 with $108,000 going to the winner, Australian Michael Sim who shot a final round 64 to triumph by 6 strokes. The 2010 event had the same purse and American Kevin Chappell won his first Nationwide Tour event. Daniel Chopra of Sweden won the 2011 event, shortened to 54 holes after fog delayed and then canceled the fourth round.

The event was not played in 2013 due to construction of a new clubhouse, but returned in 2014. In 2016, Stephan Jäger set the 18-hole scoring record (58) and 72-hole scoring record (250) on the Web.com Tour at this tournament. In 2017, basketball's Stephen Curry of the Golden State Warriors, accepted a sponsor's exemption into the Ellie Mae Classic field and shot 74 in both the first and second rounds of the tournament, missing the cut.

== Winners ==
| Year | Winner | Score | To par | Margin of victory | Runner(s)-up |
Ellie Mae Classic
| 2019 | (United States) Zac Blair | 263 | −17 | 1 stroke | (United States) Brandon Crick |
| 2018 | (United States) Trevor Cone | 257 | −23 | 4 strokes | (United States) Josh Teater |
| 2017 | (United States) Martin Piller | 262 | −18 | 1 stroke | (United States) Brandon Harkins |
| 2016 | (Germany) Stephan Jäger | 250 | −30 | 7 strokes | (Australia) Rhein Gibson |
Stonebrae Classic
| 2015 | (South Korea) Kim Si-woo | 268 | −12 | Playoff | (United States) Jamie Lovemark (United States) Wes Roach |
| 2014 | (United States) Tony Finau | 258 | −22 | 3 strokes | (United States) Daniel Berger (Argentina) Fabián Gómez (United States) Zack Sucher |
TPC Stonebrae Championship
2013: No tournament
| 2012 | (United States) Alex Aragon | 270 | −12 | 1 stroke | (United States) Paul Haley II (United States) Matt Harmon (United States) Duffy Waldorf |
Fresh Express Classic
| 2011 | (Sweden) Daniel Chopra | 198 (Note: Shortened to 54 holes due to fog.) | −12 | 1 stroke | (Scotland) Russell Knox (United States) Luke List |
| 2010 | (United States) Kevin Chappell | 264 | −20 | 1 stroke | (Canada) David Hearn |
Stonebrae Classic
| 2009 | (Australia) Michael Sim | 266 | −18 | 6 strokes | (United States) John Kimbell (Australia) Cameron Percy |
