= 2015 Web.com Tour =

Golf tour season

2015 Web.com Tour season
- Duration: January 29, 2015 – October 4, 2015
- Number of official events: 25
- Most wins: (United States) Patton Kizzire (2) (United States) Martin Piller (2) (South Africa) Dawie van der Walt (2)
- Regular season money list: (United States) Patton Kizzire
- Finals money list: (United States) Chez Reavie
- Player of the Year: (United States) Patton Kizzire

The 2015 Web.com Tour was the 26th season of the Web.com Tour, the official development tour to the PGA Tour.

== Schedule ==
The following table lists official events during the 2015 season.

Date	Tournament	Location	Purse (US$)	Winner (Note: The number in parentheses after each winner's name is the number of Web.com Tour events they had won up to and including that tournament. This information is only shown for Web.com Tour members. It is rare for someone to accumulate many wins on the Web.com Tour as success at this level usually leads to promotion to the PGA Tour.)	OWGR points	Notes
Feb 1	Panama Claro Championship	Panama	625,000	(Australia) Mathew Goggin (5)	14	
Feb 8	Pacific Rubiales Colombia Championship	Colombia	800,000	(United States) Patrick Rodgers (1)	14	
Mar 8	Cartagena de Indias at Karibana Championship	Colombia	700,000	(United States) Andrew Landry (1)	14	New tournament
Mar 15	Brasil Champions	Brazil	850,000	(United States) Peter Malnati (2)	14	
Mar 22	Chile Classic	Chile	600,000	(South Africa) Dawie van der Walt (1)	14	
Mar 29	Chitimacha Louisiana Open	Louisiana	550,000	(United States) Kelly Kraft (1)	14	
Apr 19	El Bosque Mexico Championship	Mexico	700,000	(United States) Wes Roach (1)	14	
May 3	United Leasing Championship	Indiana	600,000	(United States) Smylie Kaufman (1)	14	
May 17	BMW Charity Pro-Am	South Carolina	675,000	(Australia) Rod Pampling (1)	14	Pro-Am
May 31	Rex Hospital Open	North Carolina	625,000	(United States) Kyle Thompson (4)	14	
Jun 7	Greater Dallas Open	Texas	500,000	(United States) Tyler Aldridge (1)	14	New tournament
Jun 14	Rust-Oleum Championship	Ohio	600,000	(United States) Shane Bertsch (3)	14	
Jun 28	Air Capital Classic	Kansas	600,000	(United States) Rob Oppenheim (1)	14	
Jul 5	Nova Scotia Open	Canada	650,000	(Mexico) Abraham Ancer (1)	14	
Jul 12	Albertsons Boise Open	Idaho	800,000	(United States) Martin Piller (4)	14	
Jul 19	Stonebrae Classic	California	600,000	(South Korea) Kim Si-woo (1)	14	
Aug 2	Utah Championship	Utah	650,000	(United States) Patton Kizzire (1)	14	
Aug 9	Digital Ally Open	Kansas	600,000	(United States) Martin Piller (5)	14	
Aug 16	Price Cutter Charity Championship	Missouri	675,000	(South Africa) Dawie van der Walt (2)	14	
Aug 23	News Sentinel Open	Tennessee	550,000	(United States) Patton Kizzire (2)	14	
Aug 30	WinCo Foods Portland Open	Oregon	800,000	(United States) Dicky Pride (1)	14	
Sep 13	Hotel Fitness Championship	Indiana	1,000,000	(Sweden) Henrik Norlander (1)	16	Finals event
Sep 20	Small Business Connection Championship	North Carolina	1,000,000	(United States) Chez Reavie (2)	16	Finals event
Sep 27	Nationwide Children's Hospital Championship	Ohio	1,000,000	(United States) Andrew Loupe (1)	16	Finals event
Oct 4	Web.com Tour Championship	Florida	1,000,000	(Argentina) Emiliano Grillo (1)	20	Finals event

== Location of tournaments ==
Location of tournaments of the 2015 Web.com Tour in the United States and Canada.
Regular-season events
Regular-season finale
Finals events
Location of tournaments of the 2015 Web.com Tour outside the United States and Canada.

== Money list ==
=== Regular season money list ===
The regular season money list was based on prize money won during the season, calculated in U.S. dollars. The top 25 players on the regular season money list earned status to play on the 2015–16 PGA Tour.

Position	Player	Prize money ($)
1	(United States) Patton Kizzire	518,241
2	(United States) Martin Piller	343,649
3	(South Africa) Dawie van der Walt	298,235
4	(United States) Peter Malnati	282,408
5	(United States) Dicky Pride	253,057

=== Finals money list ===
The Finals money list was based on prize money won during the Web.com Tour Finals, calculated in U.S. dollars. The top 25 players on the Finals money list (not otherwise exempt) earned status to play on the 2015–16 PGA Tour.

Position	Player	Prize money ($)
1	(United States) Chez Reavie	323,067
2	(Argentina) Emiliano Grillo	283,667
3	(Sweden) Henrik Norlander	215,743
4	(United States) Andrew Loupe	195,405
5	(United States) Roberto Castro	130,785

== Awards ==
Award	Winner	Ref.
Player of the Year (Jack Nicklaus Trophy)	(United States) Patton Kizzire	
