= Chez Reavie =

American professional golfer (born 1981)

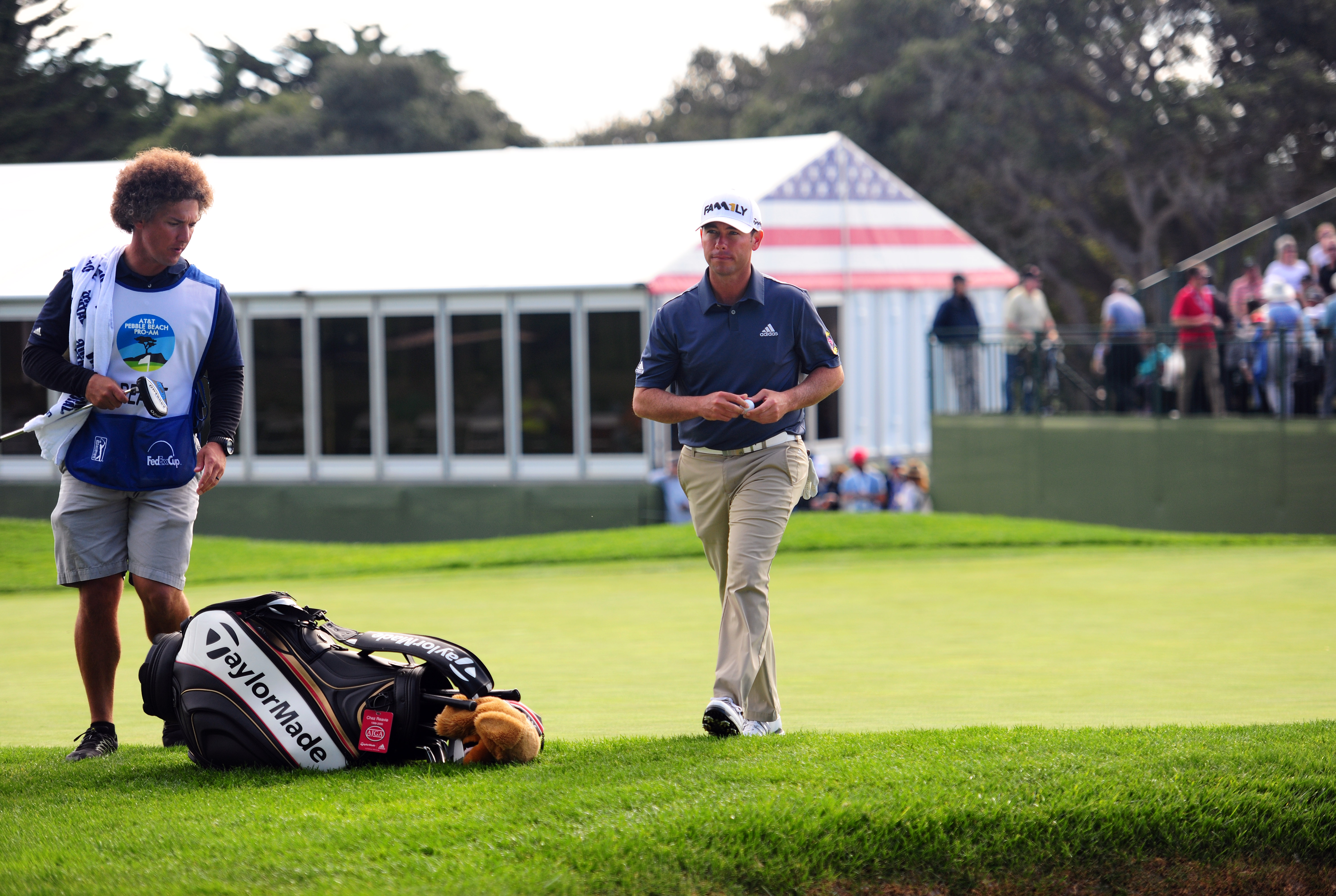
- Reavie at the 2016 AT&T Pebble Beach Pro-Am

Personal information
- Full name: William Chesney Reavie
- Nationality: United States
- Born: November 12, 1981 (age 44) Wichita, Kansas, U.S.
- Height: 5 ft 9 in (1.75 m)
- Weight: 160 lb (73 kg; 11 st)

Career
- Sport: Golf
- College: Arizona State University
- Turned professional: 2004
- Current tours: PGA Tour; European Tour
- Former tours: Web.com Tour; Gateway Tour
- Professional wins: 6
- Highest ranking: 26 (June 23, 2019) (as of October 25, 2026)

Number of wins by tour
- PGA Tour: 3
- European Tour: 1
- Korn Ferry Tour: 2
- Other: 1

Best results in major championships
- Masters Tournament: T29: 2020
- PGA Championship: T12: 2018
- U.S. Open: T3: 2019
- The Open Championship: T59: 2021

Achievements and awards
- Web.com Tour Finals money list winner: 2015

William Chesney "Chez" Reavie (born November 12, 1981) is an American professional golfer who plays on the PGA Tour.

== Early life and amateur career ==
In 1981, Reavie was born in Wichita, Kansas. He attended Dobson High School in Mesa, Arizona. Reavie played college golf at Arizona State University.

== Professional career ==
In 2004, Reavie turned professional. Reavie played on the Nationwide Tour from 2005 through 2007, where he won once at the 2007 Knoxville Open. He finished 18th on the money list on the Nationwide Tour in 2007 to earn his PGA Tour card.

In 2008, Reavie's rookie season on the PGA Tour. During this season, on July 27, 2008, Reavie won his maiden PGA Tour title, at the 2008 RBC Canadian Open. The win earned him $900,000 and a two-year exemption to remain on the PGA Tour.

Knee surgery limited Reavie in 2010 and he began the 2011 season on a major medical extension, where he had thirteen events to keep his Tour Card. Reavie did not earn enough to retain full tour privileges, but by merely making the cut at the 2011 Memorial Tournament (the final start of his exemption), he earned conditional status for the rest of 2011. Reavie still managed to play in 22 events, making 15 cuts, and placing high enough to earn a spot in the FedEx Cup playoffs. His earnings of over one million dollars prior to the FedEx Cup secured his 2012 Tour Card. He nearly won for the first time in over three years at the 2011 Deutsche Bank Championship, but had encountered difficulties on the 18th hole, before losing to Webb Simpson on the second extra hole of a playoff. He would finish 10th in the 2011 FedEx Cup standings, 34th on the money list with $2,285,067, and an OWGR rank of 67th after ending 2010 762nd in the world.

After a mediocre 2012 season, that saw Reavie finish 135th on the money list, he went back to Q School to regain his PGA Tour card. He finished T22 and was one of the last players to earn a PGA Tour card through Q School. He is also the last former PGA Tour winner to regain a Tour card in that manner.

Reavie had left wrist surgery and did not play during the 2013–14 season. He was granted 24 starts for the 2014–15 season to satisfy a medical extension.

Reavie earned his second Web.com Tour win and first win in seven years at the 2015 Small Business Connection Championship, the second of four Web.com Tour Finals events. Reavie finished at the top of the Finals money list, which made him fully exempt for the 2015–16 season, regardless of how he performed during the remaining five starts of his medical extension.

In January 2018, Reavie looking to end a 10-year drought on the PGA Tour, lost in a sudden-death playoff at the Waste Management Phoenix Open to Gary Woodland. Having led for the majority of the final round, following a strong finish by Woodland, Reavie had to birdie the 17th and 18th holes to force a playoff. At the first extra hole, both players missed the green with their approaches, but Reavie played a poor chip shot and missed the par putt, allowing Woodland to win with a par. This was however Reavie's best result on tour since 2011. The following week, Reavie finished as a runner-up again at the AT&T Pebble Beach Pro-Am, three strokes behind Ted Potter Jr.

On June 16, 2019, Reavie finished tied for 3rd at the U.S. Open at Pebble Beach Golf Links in Pebble Beach, California. This marked not only Reavie's best performance in a major championship, but was also the first time he had placed in the top 10. The result also moved Reavie back into the world's top 50.

On June 23, 2019, Reavie captured his second PGA Tour win at the Travelers Championship, ending a near eleven-year drought. He carried the 54-hole lead of six strokes over the chasing pack. He got chased down by Keegan Bradley and held just a one-shot advantage, as the pair walked up the 17th. Reavie birdied the hole while Bradley made a double-bogey six, sealing what would end up being a four-stroke victory. As of June 24, 2019, Reavie was ranked 26th in the Official World Golf Ranking, the highest ranking of his career.

== Amateur wins ==
- 2001 U.S. Amateur Public Links

== Professional wins (6) ==
=== PGA Tour wins (3) ===
No.	Date	Tournament	Winning score	Margin of victory	Runner(s)-up
1	Jul 27, 2008	RBC Canadian Open	−17 (65-64-68-70=267)	3 strokes	(United States) Billy Mayfair
2	Jun 23, 2019	Travelers Championship	−17 (65-66-63-69=263)	4 strokes	(United States) Keegan Bradley, (United States) Zack Sucher
3	Jul 17, 2022	Barracuda Championship^{1}	43 pts (9-19-9-6=43)	1 point	(Sweden) Alex Norén

^{1}Co-sanctioned by the European Tour

PGA Tour playoff record (0–2)

No.	Year	Tournament	Opponent	Result
1	2011	Deutsche Bank Championship	(United States) Webb Simpson	Lost to birdie on second extra hole
2	2018	Waste Management Phoenix Open	(United States) Gary Woodland	Lost to par on first extra hole

=== European Tour wins (1) ===
No.	Date	Tournament	Winning score	Margin of victory	Runner-up
1	Jul 17, 2022	Barracuda Championship^{1}	43 pts (9-19-9-6=43)	1 point	(Sweden) Alex Norén

^{1}Co-sanctioned by the PGA Tour

=== Web.com Tour wins (2) ===
Legend
Finals events (1)
Other Web.com Tour (1)

No.	Date	Tournament	Winning score	Margin of victory	Runner(s)-up
1	Jun 24, 2007	Knoxville Open	−17 (68-70-65-68=271)	3 strokes	(United States) Kyle McCarthy
2	Aug 31, 2015	Small Business Connection Championship	−15 (69-69-69-66=273)	1 stroke	(Argentina) Emiliano Grillo, (United States) Steve Marino, (United States) Jamie Lovemark

=== Gateway Tour wins (1) ===
No.	Date	Tournament	Winning score	Margin of victory	Runners-up
1	Apr 28, 2005	Desert Spring 10	−18 (67-67-64=198)	2 strokes	(United States) Ben Pettit, (United States) Tom Stankowski

== Results in major championships ==
Results not in chronological order in 2020.

Tournament	2002	2003	2004	2005	2006	2007	2008	2009
Masters Tournament	CUT							CUT
U.S. Open		CUT	T62					
The Open Championship								
PGA Championship							T60	

Tournament	2010	2011	2012	2013	2014	2015	2016	2017	2018
Masters Tournament			CUT						53
U.S. Open		T45	CUT					T16	CUT
The Open Championship			CUT						CUT
PGA Championship			T62					T22	T12

Tournament	2019	2020	2021	2022	2023
Masters Tournament		T29			
PGA Championship	T14	T75	CUT		T40
U.S. Open	T3	CUT	T40		
The Open Championship	CUT	NT	T59		

Top 10
Did not play

CUT = missed the half-way cut
"T" indicates a tie for a place
NT = No tournament due to COVID-19 pandemic

=== Summary ===
Tournament	Wins	2nd	3rd	Top-5	Top-10	Top-25	Events	Cuts made
Masters Tournament	0	0	0	0	0	0	5	2
PGA Championship	0	0	0	0	0	3	8	7
U.S. Open	0	0	1	1	1	2	9	5
The Open Championship	0	0	0	0	0	0	4	1
Totals	0	0	1	1	1	5	26	15

- Most consecutive cuts made – 4 (2012 PGA – 2018 Masters)
- Longest streak of top-10s – 1

== Results in The Players Championship ==
Tournament	2009	2010	2011	2012	2013	2014	2015	2016	2017	2018	2019	2020	2021	2022	2023	2024
The Players Championship	T60			CUT				CUT	T56	T30	CUT	C	CUT	CUT	CUT	CUT

Did not play

CUT = missed the halfway cut
"T" indicates a tie for a place
C = Canceled after the first round due to the COVID-19 pandemic

== Results in World Golf Championships ==
Results not in chronological order before 2015.

Tournament	2008	2009	2010	2011	2012	2013	2014	2015	2016	2017	2018	2019	2020
Championship					T35						T52	T65	T29
Match Play											T29	T56	NT^{1}
Invitational	T52											T27	T6
Champions				68						T24	T35	T60	NT^{1}

^{1}Cancelled due to COVID-19 pandemic

Top 10
Did not play

NT = no tournament
"T" = tied
Note that the HSBC Champions did not become a WGC event until 2009.

== See also ==
- 2007 Nationwide Tour graduates
- 2012 PGA Tour Qualifying School graduates
- 2015 Web.com Tour Finals graduates
