= Andrew Loupe =

American golfer

Personal information
- Full name: Andrew Gravolet Loupe
- Nationality: United States
- Born: November 22, 1988 (age 37) Baton Rouge, Louisiana, U.S.
- Height: 6 ft 1 in (1.85 m)
- Weight: 180 lb (82 kg; 13 st)

Career
- Sport: Golf
- College: LSU
- Turned professional: 2011
- Current tour: PGA Tour
- Former tour: Web.com Tour
- Professional wins: 1

Number of wins by tour
- Korn Ferry Tour: 1

Andrew Gravolet Loupe (born November 22, 1988) is an American professional golfer.

== Early life and amateur career ==
In 1988, Loupe was born in Baton Rouge, Louisiana. He attended Episcopal High School. Loupe was a member of the school's golf team and won the Louisiana Junior Amateur Championship in 2005. He was also a two-time all-state guard in basketball and was named The Advocate High School Athlete of the Year as a junior in 2006.

Loupe played college golf at LSU and was a two-time All-American.

== Professional career ==
In 2011, Loupe turned professional. He spent most of the next two seasons on the NGA Pro Golf Tour. He played his first PGA Tour event in 2011 when he qualified for the Zurich Classic of New Orleans; he went on to miss the cut.

He played on the Web.com Tour in 2013, finishing 70th in the standings: he ranked second in driving distance with an average of 315.2 yards. He finished T-6 at the season-ending Web.com Tour Championship: this gave him a ranking of 23rd in the Finals rankings (excluding regular season Top 25) to earn his 2014 PGA Tour card.

Loupe missed his first five cuts to start the 2014 season before shooting an eight-under-par 63 at Monterey Peninsula to take the first-round lead at the AT&T Pebble Beach National Pro-Am. He went on to finish T-27. After a T-12 finish in his next tournament, the Puerto Rico Open, he shot an opening-round 67 to lead the Valero Texas Open en route to a T-4 finish. He finished the 2014 season in 137th place to earn conditional status for the 2015 season; he competed in the 2014 Web.com Tour Finals but was unable to improve his category.

In 2015, he finished 198th in the FedEx standings, but a win in one of the Web.com Tour Finals events earned him a return to the PGA Tour.

== Professional wins (1) ==
=== Web.com Tour wins (1) ===
Legend
Finals events (1)
Other Web.com Tour (0)

No.	Date	Tournament	Winning score	Margin of victory	Runners-up
1	Sep 27, 2015	Nationwide Children's Hospital Championship	−5 (71-70-68-70=279)	2 strokes	(United States) Bronson Burgoon, (United States) Roberto Castro, (United States) Tom Hoge

== See also ==
- 2013 Web.com Tour Finals graduates
- 2015 Web.com Tour Finals graduates
