= Jamie Lovemark =

American professional golfer (born 1988)

Personal information
- Nationality: United States
- Born: January 23, 1988 (age 38) Rancho Santa Fe, California, U.S.
- Height: 6 ft 4 in (1.93 m)
- Weight: 210 lb (95 kg; 15 st)

Career
- Sport: Golf
- College: University of Southern California
- Turned professional: 2009
- Former tours: PGA Tour; Korn Ferry Tour
- Professional wins: 2
- Highest ranking: 77 (May 1, 2016)

Number of wins by tour
- Korn Ferry Tour: 2

Best results in major championships
- Masters Tournament: DNP
- PGA Championship: T33: 2017
- U.S. Open: T18: 2015
- The Open Championship: T22: 2017

Achievements and awards
- Haskins Award: 2007
- Nationwide Tour money list winner: 2010
- Nationwide Tour Player of the Year: 2010

Jamie Lovemark (born January 23, 1988) is an American professional golfer who played on the PGA Tour and Korn Ferry Tour.

== Amateur career ==
Lovemark was born in Rancho Santa Fe, California and attended Torrey Pines High School. He won the 2005 Western Amateur and therefore received a special exemption into the Cialis Western Open, where he finished T54. He also played on the 2007 Walker Cup team. He was a two-time AJGA All-American in 2004 and 2005. In 2004 he captured both the AJGA Rolex Tournament of Champions and Western Junior in back-to-back weeks.

Lovemark attended the University of Southern California and found success there on the golf team. He was a two-time first-team All-American. He had three top-10 finishes and a scratch handicap. His sophomore season was his most successful. He won the NCAA Individual title. He also won the Arnold Palmer, Jack Nicklaus and Phil Mickelson awards for individual medalist, national player of the year and outstanding freshman and the Haskins Award.

Lovemark played in two Nationwide Tour events in 2007, losing in a playoff at the Rochester Area Charities Showdown at Somerby.

Lovemark was the number one golfer in the World Amateur Golf Ranking for several weeks in 2007.

== Professional career ==
In October 2009, Lovemark received a sponsor's invitation into the Frys.com Open. It was only his 9th PGA Tour event, and only his fourth as a professional. He finished in a tie for first with Troy Matteson and Rickie Fowler. Lovemark and Fowler were beaten on the second playoff hole after Matteson made birdie. Lovemark made $440,000 for his tie for second finish.

Lovemark began to play full-time on the Nationwide Tour in 2010. He won his first title in June at the Mexico Open Bicentenary, winning in a playoff over B. J. Staten after he eagled the first playoff hole while Staten only could manage par. Lovemark was the money leader on the Nationwide Tour in 2010, earning his 2011 PGA Tour card. He also won the Player of the Year award.

Lovemark's 2011 season did not go well. He missed three cuts in his first four events, with a T58 at the Farmers Insurance Open and withdrawing from the AT&T Pebble Beach National Pro-Am due to back problems. Lovemark made two cuts in nine events and after withdrawing from The Players Championship (earning the spot as the Nationwide Tour's money leader), he applied for a medical extension. For 2012, the PGA Tour granted Lovemark 16 starts to earn enough money to keep his tour card. Lovemark could not satisfy his medical exemption and lost his PGA Tour card.

Lovemark played on the Web.com Tour in 2013, winning one event, the Midwest Classic in July. He finished 12th on the 2013 Web.com Tour regular season money list to earn his 2014 PGA Tour card. He finished T-12 at the RBC Canadian Open and T-28 at the Farmers Insurance Open but missed several cuts. He entered the 2014 Web.com Tour Finals, where he finished 14th at the Web.com Tour Championship and lost his PGA Tour card.

In the 2015 Web.com Tour season, he had four top-10 finishes and finished 12th, re-earning his playing rights on the PGA Tour. Also, he played in the U.S. Open, finishing T-18.

Lovemark lost in a playoff at the 2016 Zurich Classic of New Orleans to Brian Stuard. He ended the year 43rd on the FedEx Cup points ranking, keeping his card for the first time. In 2017, he finished 47th.

== Amateur wins ==
- 2004 AJGA Rolex Tournament of Champions, Western Junior
- 2005 Western Amateur
- 2007 NCAA Championship

== Professional wins (2) ==
=== Web.com Tour wins (2) ===
No.	Date	Tournament	Winning score	Margin of victory	Runner-up
1	Jun 27, 2010	Mexico Open Bicentenary	−12 (65-71-72-68=276)	Playoff	(United States) B. J. Staten
2	Jul 21, 2013	Midwest Classic	−18 (67-68-65-66=266)	1 stroke	(United States) Mark Anderson

Web.com Tour playoff record (1–2)

No.	Year	Tournament	Opponent(s)	Result
1	2007	Rochester Area Charities Showdown (as an amateur)	(United States) Chris Riley	Lost to par on second extra hole
2	2010	Mexico Open Bicentenary	(United States) B. J. Staten	Won with eagle on first extra hole
3	2015	Stonebrae Classic	(South Korea) Kim Si-woo, (United States) Wes Roach	Kim won with birdie on first extra hole

== Playoff record ==
PGA Tour playoff record (0–2)

No.	Year	Tournament	Opponents	Result
1	2009	Frys.com Open	(United States) Rickie Fowler, (United States) Troy Matteson	Matteson won with birdie on second extra hole
2	2016	Zurich Classic of New Orleans	(South Korea) An Byeong-hun, (United States) Brian Stuard	Stuard won with birdie on second extra hole An eliminated by par on first hole

== Results in major championships ==
Tournament	2015	2016	2017	2018
Masters Tournament				
U.S. Open	T18		T27	
The Open Championship		CUT	T22	
PGA Championship		CUT	T33	CUT

Did not play

CUT = missed the half-way cut
"T" indicates a tie for a place

=== Summary ===
Tournament	Wins	2nd	3rd	Top-5	Top-10	Top-25	Events	Cuts made
Masters Tournament	0	0	0	0	0	0	0	0
U.S. Open	0	0	0	0	0	1	2	2
The Open Championship	0	0	0	0	0	1	2	1
PGA Championship	0	0	0	0	0	0	3	1
Totals	0	0	0	0	0	2	7	4

- Most consecutive cuts made – 3 (2017 U.S. Open – 2017 PGA)
- Longest streak of top-10s – 0

== Results in The Players Championship ==
Tournament	2016	2017	2018
The Players Championship	T64	T75	T17

"T" indicates a tie for a place

== U.S. national team appearances ==
Amateur

- Palmer Cup: 2007 (winners)
- Walker Cup: 2007 (winners)
- Eisenhower Trophy: 2008

== See also ==
- 2010 Nationwide Tour graduates
- 2013 Web.com Tour Finals graduates
- 2015 Web.com Tour Finals graduates
