= Lucas Lee (golfer) =

Brazilian golfer

Personal information
- Nationality: Brazil
- Born: 1 August 1987 (age 39) São Paulo, Brazil
- Height: 5 ft 8 in (1.73 m)
- Weight: 179 lb (81 kg; 12.8 st)

Career
- Sport: Golf
- College: UCLA
- Turned professional: 2008
- Former tours: PGA Tour Canada (2009−13); Asian Tour (2010–12); OneAsia Tour (2013−14); PGA Tour China (2014); Web.com Tour (2015); PGA Tour (2016)

Lucas Lee (born 1 August 1987) is a Brazilian professional golfer. He won his 2016 PGA Tour card after graduating from the Web.com Tour. He was the first alumnus of PGA Tour China to earn a PGA Tour card.

Lee played college golf at UCLA where he was an All-American in 2007, won five tournaments and helped his team to the NCAA Championship in 2008. He turned professional in 2008.

Lee played on PGA Tour Canada from 2009 to 2013, finishing second five times. He played on the Asian Tour from 2010 to 2012, finishing 97th on the Order of Merit in 2010. He played on the OneAsia Tour from 2012 to 2014, finishing 43rd, 26th, and 66th on the Order of Merit, respectively. He played on PGA Tour China in 2014, had six top-10 finishes and finished eighth on the Order of Merit. He played on the Web.com Tour in 2015, with two runner-up finishes. He finished 23rd on the regular season money list to earn his PGA Tour card of 2016. In the 2016 PGA Tour, Lee had a best result of 36th and finished outside the top 200 in the FedEx Cup points list, which cost him his PGA Tour card.

== Team appearances ==
Professional

- World Cup (representing Brazil): 2011

== See also ==
- 2015 Web.com Tour Finals graduates
