= Brett Stegmaier =

American professional golfer (born 1983)

Personal information
- Full name: Brett Harrison Stegmaier
- Nationality: United States
- Born: July 2, 1983 (age 43) Madison, Connecticut, U.S.
- Height: 6 ft 3 in (1.91 m)
- Weight: 180 lb (82 kg; 13 st)

Career
- Sport: Golf
- College: University of Florida
- Turned professional: 2006
- Current tours: Korn Ferry Tour; Minor League Golf Tour
- Former tour: PGA Tour
- Professional wins: 1

Best results in major championships
- Masters Tournament: DNP
- PGA Championship: DNP
- U.S. Open: CUT: 2014
- The Open Championship: DNP

Achievements and awards
- Minor League Golf Tour money list winner: 2025

Brett Harrison Stegmaier (born July 2, 1983) is an American professional golfer who currently plays on the Korn Ferry Tour.

== Amateur career ==
Stegmaier played for the University of Florida where he was a Southeastern Conference champion and All-American.

== Professional career ==
Prior to earning his PGA Tour card for the 2016 season, Stegmaier spent multiple years on mini-tours and the Web.com Tour (2013−15).

Stegmaier's best PGA Tour finish was a tie for 2nd place at the 2015 Shriners Hospitals for Children Open. At that tournament, he was the second and third round leader.

In July 2023, Stegmaier won the 89th Connecticut Open. He finished 15-under-par to win by three strokes at Shuttle Meadow Country Club in Kensington, Connecticut.

== Professional wins ==
- 2023 Connecticut Open

== Playoff record ==
Web.com Tour playoff record (0–1)

No.	Year	Tournament	Opponent	Result
1	2014	Chitimacha Louisiana Open	(United States) Kris Blanks	Lost to birdie on third extra hole

== See also ==
- 2015 Web.com Tour Finals graduates
- 2017 Web.com Tour Finals graduates
