= Patton Kizzire =

American professional golfer (born 1986)

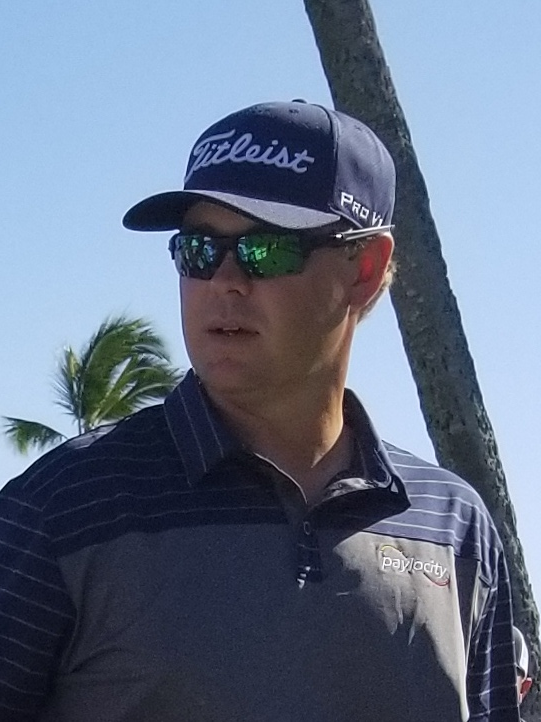
- Kizzire at the 2018 Sony Open in Hawaii

Personal information
- Full name: Maxie Patton Kizzire
- Nationality: United States
- Born: March 3, 1986 (age 40) Montgomery, Alabama, U.S.
- Height: 6 ft 5 in (1.96 m)
- Weight: 210 lb (95 kg; 15 st)

Career
- Sport: Golf
- College: Auburn University
- Turned professional: 2008
- Current tour: PGA Tour
- Former tour: Web.com Tour
- Professional wins: 6
- Highest ranking: 51 (March 4, 2018) (as of October 25, 2026)

Number of wins by tour
- PGA Tour: 3
- Korn Ferry Tour: 2
- Other: 1

Best results in major championships
- Masters Tournament: T18: 2019
- PGA Championship: T49: 2016
- U.S. Open: CUT: 2016, 2019, 2022
- The Open Championship: T68: 2016

Achievements and awards
- Web.com Tour regular season money list winner: 2015
- Web.com Tour Player of the Year: 2015

Maxie Patton Kizzire (born March 3, 1986) is an American professional golfer, currently playing on the PGA Tour.

== Early life and amateur career ==
Kizzire was born in Montgomery, Alabama. He grew up in Tuscaloosa and played his college golf at Auburn University. He earned all-Southeastern Conference first team honors in 2006–07. He won the 2007 SEC Championship. He graduated in 2008 with a Business degree. Kizzire placed third at the 2003 U.S. Junior Open.

== Professional career ==
In December 2014, Kizzire tied for 21st place at the Web.com Tour Qualifying School final stage.

In his 2015 season on the Web.com Tour, he had a breakout season and was the Tour's money list leader for most of the season. He had two runner-up finishes at the El Bosque Mexico Championship and the Rex Hospital Open, before recording his first victory at the Utah Championship. With this victory, he secured his PGA Tour card for the 2015–16 season. He was one of the most consistent players on the Web.com Tour. He only missed two cuts in his first 15 events played on the tour. He had 10 finishes within the top-25 and had 9 top-10s. He also made an appearance on the PGA Tour at the Barbasol Championship, where he missed the cut. Kizzire was voted the Web.com Tour Player of the Year.

In his rookie season on the PGA Tour, Kizzire recorded five top-10 finishes and made 20 out of 27 cuts. His season best finish being a runner-up placing at the Shriners Hospitals for Children Open. He ended the year at number 82 in the FedEx Cup standings.

On October 16, 2016, Kizzire finished runner-up to Brendan Steele in the PGA Tour season-opening Safeway Open. Kizzire had entered the final round with his first PGA Tour 54-hole lead, by one stroke. He finished with a two-under par round to miss out by a single stroke. Kizzire finished the year placed 99th on the FedEx Cup standings.

On November 12, 2017, he won his first PGA Tour title at the OHL Classic at Mayakoba. Due to inclement weather, the players had to play 36 holes on Sunday, but Kizzire held off the challenge of Rickie Fowler to claim a one stroke victory.

On January 14, 2018, Kizzire won his second title of the 2018 PGA Tour season at the Sony Open in Hawaii played at Waialae Country Club. He prevailed in a sudden-death playoff, defeating James Hahn with a birdie on the sixth extra hole to become the first multiple winner in the 2018 season. This moved Kizzire to the top of the early FedEx Cup standings.

On September 15, 2024, Kizzire broke a six year winless drought en route to his third victory on the PGA Tour at the Procore Championship played at Silverado in Napa Valley, California. Kizzire led the final three days and was victorious by five shots over David Lipsky.

== Personal life ==
Patton is one of the tallest players on the PGA Tour, standing at 6 foot 5.

== Professional wins (6) ==
=== PGA Tour wins (3) ===
No.	Date	Tournament	Winning score	Margin of victory	Runner-up
1	Nov 12, 2017	OHL Classic at Mayakoba	−19 (62-70-66-67=265)	1 stroke	(United States) Rickie Fowler
2	Jan 14, 2018	Sony Open in Hawaii	−17 (67-64-64-68=263)	Playoff	(United States) James Hahn
3	Sep 15, 2024	Procore Championship	−20 (66-65-67-70=268)	5 strokes	(United States) David Lipsky

PGA Tour playoff record (1–0)

No.	Year	Tournament	Opponent	Result
1	2018	Sony Open in Hawaii	(United States) James Hahn	Won with par on sixth extra hole

=== Web.com Tour wins (2) ===
No.	Date	Tournament	Winning score	Margin of victory	Runner(s)-up
1	Aug 2, 2015	Utah Championship	−19 (67-62-71-69=269)	Playoff	(South Korea) Kang Sung-hoon
2	Aug 23, 2015	News Sentinel Open	−20 (68-68-64-64=264)	4 strokes	(Canada) Brad Fritsch, (South Korea) Kim Si-woo

Web.com Tour playoff record (1–1)

No.	Year	Tournament	Opponent(s)	Result
1	2015	Rex Hospital Open	(Argentina) Miguel Ángel Carballo, (United States) Kyle Thompson	Thompson won with birdie on second extra hole
2	2015	Utah Championship	(South Korea) Kang Sung-hoon	Won with birdie on second extra hole

=== Other wins (1) ===
No.	Date	Tournament	Winning score	Margin of victory	Runners-up
1	Dec 9, 2018	QBE Shootout (with (United States) Brian Harman)	−30 (59-66-61=186)	1 stroke	(Argentina) Emiliano Grillo and (Northern Ireland) Graeme McDowell

== Results in major championships ==
Results not in chronological order in 2020.

Tournament	2016	2017	2018
Masters Tournament			CUT
U.S. Open	CUT		
The Open Championship	T68		CUT
PGA Championship	T49		CUT

Tournament	2019	2020	2021	2022	2023	2024	2025
Masters Tournament	T18						CUT
PGA Championship	CUT			T75			WD
U.S. Open	CUT			CUT			
The Open Championship	CUT	NT					

Did not play

CUT = missed the half-way cut
"T" = tied
NT = No tournament due to COVID-19 pandemic

=== Summary ===
Tournament	Wins	2nd	3rd	Top-5	Top-10	Top-25	Events	Cuts made
Masters Tournament	0	0	0	0	0	1	3	1
PGA Championship	0	0	0	0	0	0	5	2
U.S. Open	0	0	0	0	0	0	3	0
The Open Championship	0	0	0	0	0	0	3	1
Totals	0	0	0	0	0	1	14	4

- Most consecutive cuts made – 2 (2016 Open – 2016 PGA)

== Results in The Players Championship ==
Tournament	2016	2017	2018	2019	2020	2021	2022	2023	2025	2026
The Players Championship	76	CUT	CUT	T79	C	T35	T22	T65	CUT	CUT

CUT = missed the halfway cut
"T" indicates a tie for a place
C = canceled after the first round due to the COVID-19 pandemic

== Results in World Golf Championships ==
Tournament	2016	2017	2018	2019
Championship			T12	T27
Match Play	R16		T36	
Invitational			T31	
Champions			67	

Top 10
Did not play

QF, R16, R32, R64 = Round in which player lost in match play
"T" = tied

== See also ==
- 2015 Web.com Tour Finals graduates
