= Patrick Rodgers =

American professional golfer (born 1992)

Personal information
- Nationality: United States
- Born: June 30, 1992 (age 34) Avon, Indiana, U.S.
- Height: 6 ft 2 in (1.88 m)
- Weight: 185 lb (84 kg; 13.2 st)

Career
- Sport: Golf
- College: Stanford University
- Turned professional: 2014
- Current tour: PGA Tour
- Former tour: Web.com Tour
- Professional wins: 1
- Highest ranking: 68 (March 22, 2026) (as of 25 October 2026)

Number of wins by tour
- Korn Ferry Tour: 1

Best results in major championships
- Masters Tournament: DNP
- PGA Championship: T29: 2023
- U.S. Open: T31: 2021, 2022
- The Open Championship: DNP

Achievements and awards
- Haskins Award: 2014
- Ben Hogan Award: 2014

Patrick Rodgers (born June 30, 1992) is an American professional golfer who plays on the PGA Tour.

== Early life and amateur career ==
Rodgers was born in Avon, Indiana. He played golf at Avon High School for all four years.

Rodgers then attended college at Stanford University and played golf for three years, where he won 11 times, tying the record set by Tiger Woods. Rodgers was given the Ben Hogan Award and was the number one ranked golfer in the World Amateur Golf Ranking for 16 weeks in early 2014.

== Professional career ==
After turning professional in June 2014, Rodgers played on the PGA Tour via sponsor's exemptions. He earned enough non-member FedEx Cup points to qualify for the Web.com Tour Finals. He finished T-8 at the Nationwide Children's Hospital Championship. Overall, he finished 58th in the Finals, earning enough to get his 2015 Web.com Tour card. He won the second event of the season at the Pacific Rubiales Colombia Championship. In May he finished T-2 at the Wells Fargo Championship on the PGA Tour playing on a sponsor's exemption.

Rodgers earned "Special Temporary Member" status on the PGA Tour for 2015 after finishing T40 at the Memorial Tournament. He later finished 24th on the 2015 Web.com Tour money list, earning a PGA Tour card for the 2015–16 season. Even with the finish, he was not allowed to compete in the 2015 Web.com Tour Finals since he also accumulated enough FedEx Cup points to place inside the Top 125. He also could not compete in the 2015 FedEx Cup because Special Temporary Membership does not qualify a player for the FedExCup Playoffs; had he won a PGA Tour tournament, he would have earned full membership and become eligible for the playoffs. He appeared on EA Sports' Rory McIlroy PGA Tour game as a new golfer in 2015.

Rodgers opened the 2016 season with top-20 finishes in his first four events. From April through July, however, his form dipped as he made only six of 12 cuts and did not record a finish higher than T31. He nearly won the Travelers Championship in August, finishing T3, two shots behind the champion, Russell Knox. Having qualified for the FedExCup Playoffs for the first time in his career, he was eliminated after the second playoff event, the Deutsche Bank Championship, and ended 2016 ranked 62nd in the season-long standings.

The 2017 season began significantly worse for Rodgers than the 2016 season had. He missed the cut in five of his first eight tournaments, sandwiching top-10 finishes in the RSM Classic (T10) and the Farmers Insurance Open (T4) between early weekend exits. He shared the 54-hole lead at the Farmers with Brandt Snedeker, but shot a lackluster even-par 72 in the final round to finish four shots behind eventual champion Jon Rahm. Seven missed cuts in eight events followed, and Rodgers plummeted from 43rd in the FedExCup standings in January to 114th by June. Out of nowhere, Rodgers led the John Deere Classic by two strokes entering the final round. He appeared on his way to his first PGA Tour victory, going 3-under through 13 holes in the final round. He played the last five holes 1-over, however, opening the door for Bryson DeChambeau to claim the tournament with a back-nine 30 and a 15-foot birdie on the final green. Despite the heartbreaking finish, Rodgers recorded his career-best finish on the PGA Tour and earned enough FedExCup points to assure he would keep his card for the 2017–18 season.

In the final event of 2018, Rodgers came close to winning his first PGA Tour title, after firing rounds of 61-62 at the weekend of the RSM Classic to enter a playoff with Charles Howell III. He lost the playoff on the second extra hole, when Howell III holed a birdie putt after Rodgers had missed his from a similar distance.

== Personal life ==
As of December 2016, Rodgers has been in a relationship with Jade Olivia Gordon, who is a British stunt coordinator and film assistant. The two became engaged on December 28, 2017, and married on May 26, 2019, at the Vizcaya Museum & Gardens in Miami, Florida. They currently reside together in a home they purchased in Jupiter, Florida. The couple have three children.

== Amateur wins ==
- 2010 Western Junior
- 2011 Porter Cup

== Professional wins (1) ==
=== Web.com Tour wins (1) ===
No.	Date	Tournament	Winning score	To par	Margin of victory	Runner-up
1	Feb 8, 2015	Pacific Rubiales Colombia Championship	69-67-66-65=267	−17	Playoff	(United States) Steve Marino

Web.com Tour playoff record (1–0)

No.	Year	Tournament	Opponent	Result
1	2015	Pacific Rubiales Colombia Championship	(United States) Steve Marino	Won with birdie on second extra hole

== Playoff record ==
PGA Tour playoff record (0–2)

No.	Year	Tournament	Opponent	Result
1	2018	RSM Classic	(United States) Charles Howell III	Lost to birdie on second extra hole
2	2023	Barracuda Championship	(United States) Akshay Bhatia	Lost to par on first extra hole

== Results in major championships ==
Results not in chronological order in 2020.

Tournament	2016	2017	2018
Masters Tournament			
U.S. Open	T46		T41
The Open Championship			
PGA Championship		CUT	

Tournament	2019	2020	2021	2022	2023	2024	2025	2026
Masters Tournament								
PGA Championship					T29	CUT	CUT	CUT
U.S. Open			T31	T31	T32			71
The Open Championship		NT						

Did not play

CUT = missed the half-way cut
"T" = tied
NT = no tournament due to COVID-19 pandemic

== Results in The Players Championship ==
Tournament	2016	2017	2018	2019	2020	2021	2022	2023	2024	2025	2026
The Players Championship	CUT	CUT	CUT	77	C	T65	CUT	CUT	CUT	CUT	T11

CUT = missed the halfway cut
"T" indicates a tie for a place
C = canceled after the first round due to the COVID-19 pandemic

== U.S. national team appearances ==
Amateur

- Walker Cup: 2011, 2013 (winners)
- Palmer Cup: 2012, 2013 (winners)

== See also ==
- 2015 Web.com Tour Finals graduates
- 2021 Korn Ferry Tour Finals graduates
