= 2015–16 PGA Tour =

Golf tour season

2015–16 PGA Tour season
- Duration: October 15, 2015 – September 25, 2016
- Number of official events: 46 (Note: One further tournament was scheduled but was canceled.)
- Most wins: (Australia) Jason Day (3) (United States) Dustin Johnson (3)
- FedEx Cup: (Northern Ireland) Rory McIlroy
- Money list: (United States) Dustin Johnson
- PGA Tour Player of the Year: (United States) Dustin Johnson
- PGA Player of the Year: (United States) Dustin Johnson
- Rookie of the Year: (Argentina) Emiliano Grillo

The 2015–16 PGA Tour was the 101st season of the PGA Tour, the main professional golf tour in the United States. It was also the 48th season since separating from the PGA of America, and the 10th edition of the FedEx Cup.

== Changes for 2015–16 ==
A number of events changed dates due to the 2016 Summer Olympics. In addition, the RSM Classic (formerly the McGladrey Classic) and the Valero Texas Open expanded their fields to 156.

== Schedule ==
The following table lists official events during the 2015–16 season.

Date	Tournament	Location	Purse (US$)	Winner (Note: The number in parentheses after each winner's name is the number of PGA Tour events they had won up to and including that tournament. This information is only shown for PGA Tour members.)	OWGR points	Other tours (Note: ASA − Asian Tour.)	Notes
Oct 18	Frys.com Open	California	6,000,000	(Argentina) Emiliano Grillo (1)	46		
Oct 25	Shriners Hospitals for Children Open	Nevada	6,400,000	(United States) Smylie Kaufman (1)	44		
Nov 1	CIMB Classic	Malaysia	7,000,000	(United States) Justin Thomas (1)	46	ASA	Limited-field event
Nov 8	WGC-HSBC Champions	China	8,500,000	(Scotland) Russell Knox (1)	66		World Golf Championship
Nov 9	Sanderson Farms Championship	Mississippi	4,100,000	(United States) Peter Malnati (1)	24		Alternate event
Nov 16	OHL Classic at Mayakoba	Mexico	6,200,000	(Northern Ireland) Graeme McDowell (3)	24		
Nov 22	RSM Classic	Georgia	5,700,000	(United States) Kevin Kisner (1)	32		
Jan 10	Hyundai Tournament of Champions	Hawaii	5,900,000	(United States) Jordan Spieth (7)	52		Winners-only event
Jan 17	Sony Open in Hawaii	Hawaii	5,800,000	(Argentina) Fabián Gómez (2)	46		
Jan 24	CareerBuilder Challenge	California	5,800,000	(United States) Jason Dufner (4)	40		Pro-Am
Feb 1	Farmers Insurance Open	California	6,500,000	(United States) Brandt Snedeker (8)	54		
Feb 7	Waste Management Phoenix Open	Arizona	6,500,000	(Japan) Hideki Matsuyama (2)	54		
Feb 14	AT&T Pebble Beach Pro-Am	California	7,000,000	(United States) Vaughn Taylor (3)	54		Pro-Am
Feb 21	Northern Trust Open	California	6,800,000	(United States) Bubba Watson (9)	60		
Feb 28	The Honda Classic	Florida	6,100,000	(Australia) Adam Scott (12)	58		
Mar 6	WGC-Cadillac Championship	Florida	9,500,000	(Australia) Adam Scott (13)	76		World Golf Championship
Mar 13	Valspar Championship	Florida	6,100,000	(South Africa) Charl Schwartzel (2)	52		
Mar 20	Arnold Palmer Invitational	Florida	6,300,000	(Australia) Jason Day (8)	58		Invitational
Mar 27	WGC-Dell Match Play	Texas	9,500,000	(Australia) Jason Day (9)	76		World Golf Championship
Mar 27	Puerto Rico Open	Puerto Rico	3,000,000	(United States) Tony Finau (1)	24		Alternate event
Apr 3	Shell Houston Open	Texas	6,800,000	(United States) Jim Herman (1)	54		
Apr 10	Masters Tournament	Georgia	10,000,000	(England) Danny Willett (1)	100		Major championship
Apr 17	RBC Heritage	South Carolina	5,900,000	(South Africa) Branden Grace (1)	52		Invitational
Apr 24	Valero Texas Open	Texas	6,200,000	(United States) Charley Hoffman (4)	40		
May 2	Zurich Classic of New Orleans	Louisiana	7,000,000	(United States) Brian Stuard (1)	44		
May 8	Wells Fargo Championship	North Carolina	7,300,000	(United States) James Hahn (2)	58		
May 15	The Players Championship	Florida	10,500,000	(Australia) Jason Day (10)	80		Flagship event
May 22	AT&T Byron Nelson	Texas	7,300,000	(Spain) Sergio García (9)	48		
May 29	Dean & DeLuca Invitational	Texas	6,700,000	(United States) Jordan Spieth (8)	52		Invitational
Jun 5	Memorial Tournament	Ohio	8,500,000	(United States) William McGirt (1)	66		Invitational
Jun 12	FedEx St. Jude Classic	Tennessee	6,200,000	(United States) Daniel Berger (1)	28		
Jun 19	U.S. Open	Pennsylvania	10,000,000	(United States) Dustin Johnson (10)	100		Major championship
Jun 26	Quicken Loans National	Maryland	6,900,000	(United States) Billy Hurley III (1)	40		Invitational
Jul 3	WGC-Bridgestone Invitational	Ohio	9,500,000	(United States) Dustin Johnson (11)	68		World Golf Championship
Jul 3	Barracuda Championship	Nevada	3,200,000	(Australia) Greg Chalmers (1)	24		Alternate event
~~Jul 10~~	Greenbrier Classic	West Virginia	–	Canceled (Note: Canceled due to course flooding.)	–		
Jul 17	The Open Championship	Scotland	£6,500,000	(Sweden) Henrik Stenson (5)	100		Major championship
Jul 17	Barbasol Championship	Alabama	3,500,000	(Australia) Aaron Baddeley (4)	24		Alternate event
Jul 24	RBC Canadian Open	Canada	5,900,000	(Venezuela) Jhonattan Vegas (2)	46		
Jul 31	PGA Championship	New Jersey	10,000,000	(United States) Jimmy Walker (6)	100		Major championship
Aug 7	Travelers Championship	Connecticut	6,600,000	(Scotland) Russell Knox (2)	50		
Aug 14	John Deere Classic	Illinois	4,800,000	(United States) Ryan Moore (5)	24		
Aug 21	Wyndham Championship	North Carolina	5,600,000	(South Korea) Kim Si-woo (1)	46		
Aug 28	The Barclays	New York	8,500,000	(United States) Patrick Reed (5)	74		FedEx Cup playoff event
Sep 5	Deutsche Bank Championship	Massachusetts	8,500,000	(Northern Ireland) Rory McIlroy (12)	74		FedEx Cup playoff event
Sep 11	BMW Championship	Indiana	8,500,000	(United States) Dustin Johnson (12)	70		FedEx Cup playoff event
Sep 25	Tour Championship	Georgia	8,500,000	(Northern Ireland) Rory McIlroy (13)	58		FedEx Cup playoff event

=== Unofficial events ===
The following events were sanctioned by the PGA Tour, but did not carry FedEx Cup points or official money, nor were wins official.

Date	Tournament	Location	Purse ($)	Winner(s)	OWGR points	Notes
Dec 6	Hero World Challenge	Bahamas	3,500,000	(United States) Bubba Watson	46	Limited-field event
Dec 10	Franklin Templeton Shootout	Florida	3,100,000	(United States) Jason Dufner and (United States) Brandt Snedeker	n/a	Team event
Jun 28	CVS Health Charity Classic	Rhode Island	1,500,000	(United States) Keegan Bradley and (United States) Jon Curran	n/a	Team event
Aug 14	Olympic Games	Brazil	n/a	(United Kingdom) Justin Rose	46	Limited-field event
Oct 2	Ryder Cup	Minnesota	n/a	Team USA	n/a	Team event

== Location of tournaments ==
Location of official tournaments of the 2015–16 PGA Tour in the continental United States and Canada.
600-point event (Players & Majors)
550-point event (World Golf Championships)
500-point event (Regular events)
300-point event (Alternate events)
FedEx Cup playoff event
Location of official tournaments of the 2015–16 PGA Tour outside the continental United States and Canada.
600-point event (Players & Majors)
550-point event (World Golf Championships)
500-point event (Regular events)
300-point event (Alternate events)

== FedEx Cup ==
=== Final standings ===
For full rankings, see 2016 FedEx Cup Playoffs.

Final top 10 players in the FedEx Cup:

Position	Player	Points	Bonus money ($)
1	(Northern Ireland) Rory McIlroy	3,120	10,000,000
2	(United States) Dustin Johnson	2,380	3,000,000
3	(United States) Patrick Reed	1,986	2,000,000
4	(Australia) Adam Scott	1,930	1,500,000
5	(England) Paul Casey	1,880	1,000,000
6	(Australia) Jason Day	1,440	800,000
7	(United States) Ryan Moore	1,336	700,000
8	(United States) Kevin Chappell	1,320	600,000
9	(United States) Jordan Spieth	1,168	550,000
10	(Scotland) Russell Knox	992	500,000

== Money list ==
The money list was based on prize money won during the season, calculated in U.S. dollars.

Position	Player	Prize money ($)
1	(United States) Dustin Johnson	9,365,185
2	(Australia) Jason Day	8,045,112
3	(Australia) Adam Scott	6,473,090
4	(Northern Ireland) Rory McIlroy	5,790,585
5	(United States) Patrick Reed	5,679,575
6	(United States) Jordan Spieth	5,538,470
7	(Scotland) Russell Knox	4,885,906
8	(United States) Kevin Chappell	4,501,050
9	(Japan) Hideki Matsuyama	4,193,954
10	(United States) Jimmy Walker	4,148,546

== Awards ==
Award	Winner	Ref.
PGA Tour Player of the Year (Jack Nicklaus Trophy)	(United States) Dustin Johnson	
PGA Player of the Year	(United States) Dustin Johnson	
Rookie of the Year	(Argentina) Emiliano Grillo	
Scoring leader (PGA Tour – Byron Nelson Award)	(United States) Dustin Johnson	
Scoring leader (PGA – Vardon Trophy)	(United States) Dustin Johnson	

== See also ==
- 2015 in golf
- 2016 in golf
- 2016 PGA Tour Champions season
- 2016 Web.com Tour
