= Emiliano Grillo =

Argentine professional golfer (born 1992)

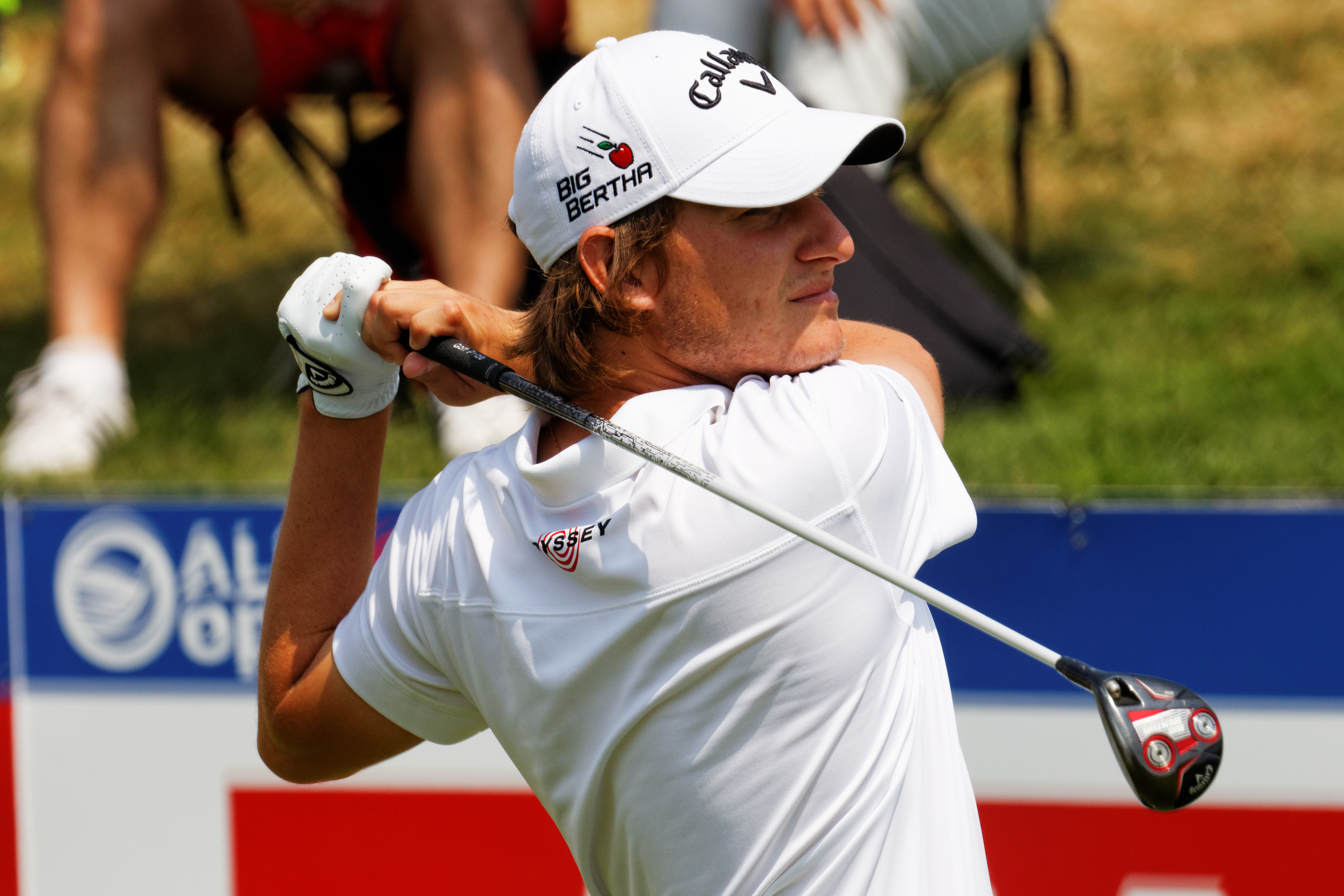

Personal information
- Full name: Hector Emiliano Grillo
- Nationality: Argentina
- Born: 14 September 1992 (age 34) Resistencia, Argentina
- Height: 1.75 m (5 ft 9 in)
- Weight: 64 kg (141 lb)

Career
- Sport: Golf
- Turned professional: 2011
- Current tour: PGA Tour
- Former tour: European Tour
- Professional wins: 4
- Highest ranking: 23 (13 November 2016)

Number of wins by tour
- PGA Tour: 2
- Korn Ferry Tour: 1
- Other: 1

Best results in major championships
- Masters Tournament: T17: 2016
- PGA Championship: T13: 2016
- U.S. Open: T19: 2025
- The Open Championship: T6: 2023

Achievements and awards
- PGA Tour Rookie of the Year: 2015–16

Hector Emiliano Grillo (Spanish pronunciation: [ˈɡɾi.lo]; born 14 September 1992) is an Argentine professional golfer who plays on the PGA Tour. He won the 2015 Frys.com Open and 2023 Charles Schwab Challenge on the PGA Tour.

== Early years and amateur career ==
In his youth, Grillo was a quarter-finalist at the 2008 U.S. Junior Amateur. He got the 2009 Byron Nelson International Junior Golf Award.

== Professional career ==
Grillo turned professional in 2011 and earned playing status on the European Tour via Qualifying School. He finished 10th in his first event, the 2012 Africa Open. He finished 94th in the 2012 European Tour Order of Merit and 89th in 2013.

In February 2014, Grillo had his best finish to date on the European Tour, when he finished runner-up behind Stephen Gallacher at the Omega Dubai Desert Classic. Later in the season he finished 8th at the BMW International Open and the BMW Masters, and 11th at the Turkish Airlines Open. He ended 44th on the European Tour Race to Dubai. He also won the Visa Open de Argentina on PGA Tour Latinoamérica.

Grillo began the 2015 European Tour season with a third place at the Volvo China Open, a fifth place at the Qatar Masters, a sixth place at the Open de España and an 11th place at the Shenzhen International. He finished fourth at the DP World Tour Championship, Dubai and 40th on the Race to Dubai.

Also in 2015, Grillo lost in a five-man playoff at the Puerto Rico Open on the PGA Tour, playing on a sponsor's exemption, and finished tenth at the Barbasol Championship. In just seven starts, he earned enough to qualify for the 2015 Web.com Tour Finals. He claimed a ninth place at the Hotel Fitness Championship, a runner-up at the Small Business Connection Championship and a first place at the Web.com Tour Championship. Therefore, he finished second on the Finals money list and got a card for the 2016 PGA Tour. Since Grillo only played in seven events during the 2014–15 season, he was still considered a rookie for the 2015–16 season.

In his eighth career PGA Tour event and first as a member, Grillo won the season-opening Frys.com Open on the 2016 PGA Tour, after beating veteran Kevin Na in a sudden-death playoff. He made a 25-foot birdie putt on the 72nd hole for 3-under-par 69, which was later tied by Na. Grillo then missed a three-foot putt for victory on the first playoff hole, but sealed the win on the second hole with a birdie after Na ended up behind a tree and could only make bogey. The victory gained Grillo entry to the Masters and the 2016 PGA Championship. He also moved up to 36th in the Official World Golf Ranking.

At the 2016 major tournaments, Grillo finished 12th at the Open Championship, 13th at the PGA Championship, 17th at the Masters and 54th at the U.S. Open, with score cards of 283, 274, 292 and 293. He was runner-up at the Japan Golf Tour's ISPS Handa Global Cup. He was voted 2016 PGA Tour Rookie of the Year.

On 28 May 2023, Grillo snapped a nearly eight-year winless drought by winning the Charles Schwab Challenge for his second PGA Tour victory. He carried a two-shot lead to the 72nd hole, but his tee shot ended up in a stream and took 5 minutes before it came to a stop. After taking a penalty from where it entered the hazard, he made double bogey putting him into a playoff with Adam Schenk. Grillo and Schenk both made pars on the first playoff hole before Grillo birdied the second playoff hole to seal the victory.

== Amateur wins ==
- 2007 Pereira Iraola Cup (as low amateur at the Argentine Open)
- 2009 Pereira Iraola Cup (as low amateur at the Argentine Open)
- 2011 Terra Cotta Invitational

== Professional wins (4) ==
=== PGA Tour wins (2) ===
No.	Date	Tournament	Winning score	To par	Margin of victory	Runner-up
1	18 Oct 2015	Frys.com Open	68-71-65-69=273	−15	Playoff	(United States) Kevin Na
2	28 May 2023	Charles Schwab Challenge	67-65-72-68=272	−8	Playoff	(United States) Adam Schenk

PGA Tour playoff record (2–2)

No.	Year	Tournament	Opponent(s)	Result
1	2015	Puerto Rico Open	(Germany) Alex Čejka, (United States) Jon Curran, (United States) Tim Petrovic, (United States) Sam Saunders	Čejka won with birdie on first extra hole
2	2015	Frys.com Open	(United States) Kevin Na	Won with birdie on second extra hole
3	2023	Charles Schwab Challenge	(United States) Adam Schenk	Won with birdie on second extra hole
4	2025	John Deere Classic	(United States) Brian Campbell	Lost to par on first extra hole

=== Web.com Tour wins (1) ===
Legend
Finals events (1)
Other Web.com Tour (0)

No.	Date	Tournament	Winning score	To par	Margin of victory	Runner-up
1	4 Oct 2015	Web.com Tour Championship	66-64-67-69=266	−14	1 stroke	(United States) Chez Reavie

=== PGA Tour Latinoamérica wins (1) ===
No.	Date	Tournament	Winning score	To par	Margin of victory	Runner-up
1	7 Dec 2014	Visa Open de Argentina	66-68-65-67=266	−18	6 strokes	(United States) Brad Hopfinger

== Playoff record ==
Japan Golf Tour playoff record (0–1)

No.	Year	Tournament	Opponent	Result
1	2016	ISPS Handa Global Cup	(South Korea) Park Jun-won	Lost to birdie on first extra hole

== Results in major championships ==
Results not in chronological order in 2020.

Tournament	2015	2016	2017	2018
Masters Tournament		T17	51	
U.S. Open		T54	CUT	CUT
The Open Championship		T12	CUT	CUT
PGA Championship	T61	T13	CUT	T31

Tournament	2019	2020	2021	2022	2023	2024	2025	2026
Masters Tournament	T62					CUT		
PGA Championship	T23	T66	T38		CUT	CUT		CUT
U.S. Open	T58				CUT	T41	T19	T23
The Open Championship	CUT	NT	T12	CUT	T6	T43		

Top 10
Did not play

CUT = missed the half-way cut
"T" = tied
NT = no tournament due to COVID-19 pandemic

=== Summary ===
Tournament	Wins	2nd	3rd	Top-5	Top-10	Top-25	Events	Cuts made
Masters Tournament	0	0	0	0	0	1	4	3
PGA Championship	0	0	0	0	0	2	10	6
U.S. Open	0	0	0	0	0	2	8	5
The Open Championship	0	0	0	0	1	3	8	4
Totals	0	0	0	0	1	7	30	18

- Most consecutive cuts made – 6 (2015 PGA – 2017 Masters)
- Longest streak of top-10s – 1 (2023 Open Championship)

== Results in The Players Championship ==
Tournament	2016	2017	2018	2019	2020	2021	2022	2023	2024	2025	2026
The Players Championship	CUT	11	T37	T26	C	CUT	CUT	CUT	T54	67	CUT

CUT = missed the halfway cut
"T" indicates a tie for a place
C = cancelled after the first round due to the COVID-19 pandemic

== Results in World Golf Championships ==
Tournament	2015	2016	2017	2018	2019
Championship		T47	T52		T58
Match Play		T38	T51		T40
Invitational		T14	T50	T66	
Champions	T35	11		T14	

Did not play

QF, R16, R32, R64 = Round in which player lost in match play
"T" = tied

== Team appearances ==
Amateur

- Eisenhower Trophy (representing Argentina): 2008, 2010

Professional

- World Cup (representing Argentina): 2013
- Presidents Cup (representing the International team): 2017

== See also ==
- 2011 European Tour Qualifying School graduates
- 2015 Web.com Tour Finals graduates
