= Kim Si-woo =

South Korean professional golfer (born 1995)

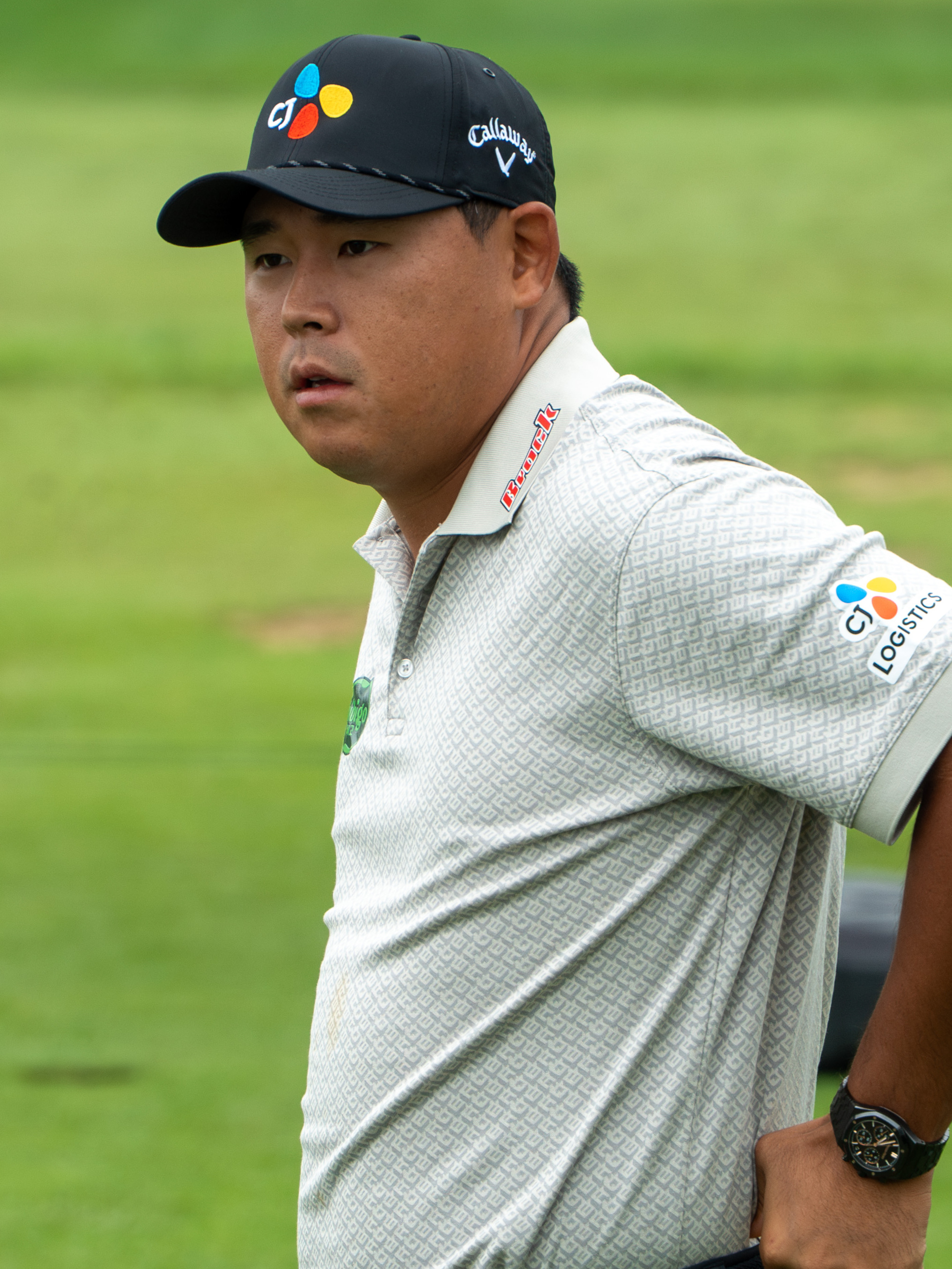
- Kim in 2025

Personal information
- Nationality: South Korea
- Born: 28 June 1995 (age 31) Seoul, South Korea
- Height: 5 ft 11 in (1.80 m)
- Weight: 182 lb (83 kg; 13.0 st)
- Spouse: Oh Ji-hyun (m. 2022)

Career
- Sport: Golf
- College: Yonsei University
- Turned professional: 2012
- Current tour: PGA Tour
- Former tours: European Tour; Web.com Tour
- Professional wins: 5
- Highest ranking: 13 (26 August 2026) (as of 15 November 2026)

Number of wins by tour
- PGA Tour: 4
- Korn Ferry Tour: 1

Best results in major championships
- Masters Tournament: T12: 2021
- PGA Championship: T8: 2025
- U.S. Open: T13: 2017
- The Open Championship: T6: 2026
Medal record
Asian Games
Gold medal – first place	2022 Hangzhou	Men's team

Kim Si-woo (Korean: 김시우; born 28 June 1995), also known as Si Woo Kim, is a South Korean professional golfer who plays on the PGA Tour. He won the 2017 Players Championship, becoming the youngest ever winner of the event at age 21.

== Professional career ==
Kim finished tied for 20th at the 2012 PGA Tour Qualifying School. He was only 17 years, 5 months, 6 days old at the time, the youngest player to graduate from the PGA Tour's qualifying school. Due to PGA Tour rules, he could not become a PGA Tour member until he turned 18, midway through the 2013 season. In eight PGA Tour starts in 2013, Kim missed the cut in seven tournaments and withdrew from the eighth. He also played in seven Web.com Tour events in 2013, making four cuts.

Kim played on the Web.com Tour in 2014, making 15 of 19 cuts including a third-place finish at the Cleveland Open. In 2015, he won his first Web.com Tour event, the Stonebrae Classic, in July. He was the second-youngest winner in Web.com Tour history, after Jason Day. He finished 2015 in tenth place in the Web.com Tour money list, to earn a place on the PGA Tour for 2016.

His first win on the PGA Tour came at the 2016 Wyndham Championship. At 21, he was the season's youngest winner. His second win on the PGA Tour came at the 2017 Players Championship, beating Ian Poulter and Louis Oosthuizen by three-shots with a bogey-free 69 in his final round, becoming the second Korean to win the title after K. J. Choi in 2011. Ranked 73rd in the world prior to the Players Championship, Kim was the second-lowest ranked player to win the tournament, with 2002 winner Craig Perks ranked outside 200th before his win. Kim moved up to 28th in the world after the win.

Kim lost in a sudden-death playoff at the 2018 RBC Heritage in April. He had held the sole lead for large portions of the final round, but shot three over on the back nine, missing a series of makeable putts, including at the last to win the tournament outright, to fall into a playoff. He lost on the third extra hole of the playoff, when Satoshi Kodaira holed a lengthy birdie putt on the par-3 17th.

In January 2021, Kim won The American Express in La Quinta, California. Kim shot a final round 8-under 64 to win by one stroke over Patrick Cantlay and claim his third PGA Tour title. In August later that year, Kim tied for the lead with five other players after 72 holes at the Wyndham Championship. Kevin Kisner took the title in the playoff.

In September 2022, Kim was selected for the International team in the 2022 Presidents Cup; he won three and lost one of the four matches he played.

In January 2023, Kim won the Sony Open in Hawaii. He birdied the final two holes to win by one shot over Hayden Buckley. It was his fourth PGA Tour victory.

== Professional wins (5) ==
=== PGA Tour wins (4) ===
Legend
Players Championships (1)
Other PGA Tour (3)

No.	Date	Tournament	Winning score	To par	Margin of victory	Runner(s)-up
1	21 Aug 2016	Wyndham Championship	68-60-64-67=259	−21	5 strokes	(England) Luke Donald
2	14 May 2017	The Players Championship	69-72-68-69=278	−10	3 strokes	(South Africa) Louis Oosthuizen, (England) Ian Poulter
3	24 Jan 2021	The American Express	66-68-67-64=265	−23	1 stroke	(United States) Patrick Cantlay
4	15 Jan 2023	Sony Open in Hawaii	67-67-64-64=262	−18	1 stroke	(United States) Hayden Buckley

PGA Tour playoff record (0–3)

No.	Year	Tournament	Opponent(s)	Result
1	2016	Barbasol Championship	(Australia) Aaron Baddeley	Lost to birdie on fourth extra hole
2	2018	RBC Heritage	(Japan) Satoshi Kodaira	Lost to birdie on third extra hole
3	2021	Wyndham Championship	(South Africa) Branden Grace, (United States) Kevin Kisner, (United States) Kevin Na, (Australia) Adam Scott, (Canada) Roger Sloan	Kisner won with birdie on second extra hole

=== Web.com Tour wins (1) ===
No.	Date	Tournament	Winning score	To par	Margin of victory	Runners-up
1	19 Jul 2015	Stonebrae Classic	66-65-69-68=268	−12	Playoff	(United States) Jamie Lovemark, (United States) Wes Roach

Web.com Tour playoff record (1–0)

No.	Year	Tournament	Opponents	Result
1	2015	Stonebrae Classic	(United States) Jamie Lovemark, (United States) Wes Roach	Won with birdie on first extra hole

== Results in major championships ==
Results not in chronological order in 2020.

Tournament	2016	2017	2018
Masters Tournament		CUT	T24
U.S. Open		T13	CUT
The Open Championship		CUT	T67
PGA Championship	CUT	WD	CUT

Tournament	2019	2020	2021	2022	2023	2024	2025	2026
Masters Tournament	T21	T34	T12	T39	T29	T30		47
PGA Championship	CUT	T13	CUT	T60	CUT	CUT	T8	T35
U.S. Open	CUT	CUT	T40	CUT	T39	T32	T42	CUT
The Open Championship	CUT	NT		T15	CUT	T43	CUT	T6

Top 10
Did not play

CUT = missed the half-way cut
WD = withdrew
"T" indicates a tie for a place
NT = no tournament due to COVID-19 pandemic

=== Summary ===
Tournament	Wins	2nd	3rd	Top-5	Top-10	Top-25	Events	Cuts made
Masters Tournament	0	0	0	0	0	3	9	8
PGA Championship	0	0	0	0	1	2	11	4
U.S. Open	0	0	0	0	0	1	10	5
The Open Championship	0	0	0	0	1	2	8	4
Totals	0	0	0	0	2	8	38	21

- Most consecutive cuts made – 4 (2024 U.S. Open – 2025 U.S. Open)
- Longest streak of top-10s – 1 (twice, current)

== The Players Championship ==
=== Wins (1) ===
Year	Championship	54 holes	Winning score	Margin	Runners-up
2017	The Players Championship	2 shot deficit	−10 (69-72-68-69=278)	3 strokes	(South Africa) Louis Oosthuizen, (England) Ian Poulter

=== Results timeline ===
Tournament	2016	2017	2018	2019	2020	2021	2022	2023	2024	2025	2026
The Players Championship	T23	1	T63	T56	C	T9	WD	T27	T6	T38	T50

Win
Top 10

"T" indicates a tie for a place
WD = withdrew
C = cancelled after the first round due to the COVID-19 pandemic

== Results in World Golf Championships ==
Tournament	2016	2017	2018	2019	2020	2021	2022	2023
Championship		T72						
Match Play		T30	R16	T61	NT^{1}	T56	T18	T17
Invitational		T50	T10			65		
Champions	T63	T69			NT^{1}	NT^{1}	NT^{1}	

^{1}Cancelled due to COVID-19 pandemic

Top 10
Did not play

QF, R16, R32, R64 = Round in which player lost in match play
"T" = Tied
NT = No tournament
Note that the Championship and Invitational were discontinued from 2022. The Champions was discontinued from 2023.

== Team appearances ==
Amateur

- Eisenhower Trophy (representing South Korea): 2012

Professional

- Presidents Cup (representing the International team): 2017, 2022, 2024, 2026
- World Cup (representing South Korea): 2018

== See also ==
- 2012 PGA Tour Qualifying School graduates
- 2015 Web.com Tour Finals graduates
