= 2019 U.S. Open (golf) =

Tournament information
- Dates: June 13–16, 2019
- Location: Pebble Beach, California; 36.568°N 121.950°W
- Course: Pebble Beach Golf Links
- Organized by: USGA
- Tours: PGA Tour; European Tour; Japan Golf Tour

Statistics
- Par: 71
- Length: 7,075 yards (6,469 m)
- Field: 156, 79 after cut
- Cut: 144 (+2)
- Prize fund: $12,500,000
- Winner's share: $2,250,000

Champion
- (United States) Gary Woodland
- 271 (−13)

Location map
- Location in the United States Location in California

The 2019 United States Open Championship was the 119th U.S. Open, played from June 13–16 at Pebble Beach Golf Links in Pebble Beach, California. It was the seventh major and sixth U.S. Open at Pebble Beach, which last hosted U.S. Opens in 2000 and 2010, won by Tiger Woods and Graeme McDowell, respectively.

Gary Woodland won his first major title by three strokes over world number one Brooks Koepka. Ranked 25th coming into the tournament, and having never finished in the top 20 in the U.S. Open previously, he was generally seen as a surprise victor. Koepka had won four of the last nine majors, and was attempting to become the first player to win three straight U.S. Opens since 1905.

Woodland shot 68 in the first round, and 65 in the second, to lead by two strokes after 36 holes. He shot 69 in the third round, to have a single-stroke lead over Justin Rose going into the final day. After shooting a 69 in the final round, he converted a 54-hole lead into a victory for the first time in eight attempts in stroke-play events. His 72-hole winning score, a 13-under-par 271, was the lowest relative to par since 2011 and included a stretch of 34 holes without a bogey. Woodland led the field in scrambling, having begun the week ranked 169th in that category.

The previous winner of the U.S. Open at Pebble Beach, Graeme McDowell, finished tied for 16th with a 3-under-par 281. Tiger Woods was tied 58th after the first round, and began his final round by bogeying four of his first six holes, but rallied on the back nine to finish tied for 21st with a 2-under-par 282. Justin Rose entered the final round one shot back of Woodland but made three bogeys on his final seven holes to finish tied for 3rd. On his 49th birthday, six-time U.S. Open runner-up, Phil Mickelson finished with a 4-over-par 288, having won the AT&T Pebble Beach Pro-Am earlier in the year at Pebble Beach.

79 players made the cut, including four amateurs. The leading amateur was Norwegian Viktor Hovland, who had qualified by winning the 2018 U.S. Amateur, which was also held at Pebble Beach. He finished tied for 12th at 4-under-par, to become first low amateur at the Masters and U.S. Open in the same season since Matt Kuchar in 1998.

The U.S. Open traditionally has a winning score around par, but a joint record 31 players finished under par for the tournament. This was partly attributed by the media to the soft conditions resulting from a marine layer, and relatively low wind speeds for a links-style course.

== Venue ==
=== Course layout ===
Pebble Beach hosted the AT&T Pebble Beach Pro-Am in February of the same year. The changes made to the course since that event include reducing par from 72 to 71, cutting the greens from .125" to .110", and growing the rough from 2" to between 3-5".

Hole	Yards	Par	Hole	Yards	Par
1	380	4	10	495	4
2	516	4	11	390	4
3	404	4	12	202	3
4	331	4	13	445	4
5	195	3	14	580	5
6	523	5	15	397	4
7	109	3	16	403	4
8	428	4	17	208	3
9	526	4	18	543	5
Out	3,412	35	In	3,663	36
Source:		Total		7,075	71

Previous course lengths for major championships

- 7,040 yards (6,437 m) - par 71, 2010 U.S. Open
- 6,846 yards (6,260 m) - par 71, 2000 U.S. Open
- 6,809 yards (6,226 m) - par 72, 1992 U.S. Open
- 6,825 yards (6,241 m) - par 72, 1982 U.S. Open
- 6,806 yards (6,223 m) - par 72, 1977 PGA Championship
- 6,812 yards (6,229 m) - par 72, 1972 U.S. Open

Prior to 2000, the 2nd hole was played as a par 5.

2019 yardages by round

Round	Hole	1	2	3	4	5	6	7	8	9	Out	10	11	12	13	14	15	16	17	18	In	Total
	Par	4	4	4	4	3	5	3	4	4	35	4	4	3	4	5	4	4	3	5	36	71
1	Yards	381	502	412	334	188	518	108	433	502	3,378	493	387	202	447	592	399	402	218	552	3,692	7,070
2	Yards	382	516	394	334	186	529	116	432	526	3,415	497	389	185	452	583	399	407	210	535	3,657	7,072
3	Yards	376	515	410	315	184	524	98	428	525	3,375	499	388	209	440	589	399	395	203	544	3,666	7,041
4	Yards	386	523	407	324	204	520	102	433	533	3,432	492	390	198	448	582	394	409	220	539	3,672	7,104

- Scoring average: 72.352
  - by round: 72.685, 72.571, 72.430, 71.190
- Most difficult holes in relation to par: 10, 8 and 9, 9, 9

== Field ==
About half the field consisted of players who are exempt from qualifying for the U.S. Open. Each player is classified according to the first category in which he qualified, and other categories are shown in parentheses.

1. Winners of the U.S. Open Championship during the last ten years

Lucas Glover, Dustin Johnson (9,11,12,13,14), Martin Kaymer, Brooks Koepka (7,9,11,12,13,14), Graeme McDowell, Rory McIlroy (6,7,8,9,12,13,14), Justin Rose (11,12,13,14), Webb Simpson (8,11,12,13,14), Jordan Spieth (5,6,13,14)

2. Winners of the 2018 U.S. Amateur, U.S. Junior Amateur, and U.S. Mid-Amateur, and runner-up of the 2018 U.S. Amateur

Devon Bling (a), Viktor Hovland (a), Kevin O'Connell (a), Michael Thorbjornsen (a)

3. Winner of the 2018 Amateur Championship

Jovan Rebula (a)

4. Winner of the 2018 Mark H. McCormack Medal (men's World Amateur Golf Ranking)

- Braden Thornberry forfeited his exemption by turning professional in December 2018.

5. Winners of the Masters Tournament during the last five years

Sergio García (13,14), Patrick Reed (11,12,13,14), Danny Willett, Tiger Woods (9,12,13,14)

6. Winners of The Open Championship during the last five years

Zach Johnson, Francesco Molinari (9,12,13,14), Henrik Stenson (11,13,14)

7. Winners of the PGA Championship during the last five years

Jason Day (12,13,14), Justin Thomas (12,13,14), Jimmy Walker

8. Winners of The Players Championship during the last three years

Kim Si-woo (13,14)

9. Winners of multiple PGA Tour events that award a full-point allocation for the FedEx Cup, between the 2018 U.S. Open and the 2019 U.S. Open

Bryson DeChambeau (12,13,14), Matt Kuchar (13,14), Kevin Na (12,13,14), Xander Schauffele (11,12,13,14)

10. Winner of the 2018 U.S. Senior Open Championship

David Toms

11. The 10 lowest scorers and anyone tying for 10th place at the 2018 U.S. Open Championship

Daniel Berger, Tony Finau (12,13,14), Tommy Fleetwood (12,13,14), Tyrrell Hatton (13,14)

12. Players who qualified for the season-ending 2018 Tour Championship

Keegan Bradley (13,14), Patrick Cantlay (13,14), Paul Casey (13,14), Rickie Fowler (13,14), Billy Horschel (13,14), Patton Kizzire, Marc Leishman (13,14), Hideki Matsuyama (13,14), Phil Mickelson (13,14), Jon Rahm (13,14), Cameron Smith (13,14), Kyle Stanley (13,14), Bubba Watson (13,14), Aaron Wise, Gary Woodland (13,14)

13. The top 60 point leaders and ties as of May 20, 2019 in the Official World Golf Ranking

An Byeong-hun (14), Abraham Ancer, Kiradech Aphibarnrat (14), Lucas Bjerregaard (14), Rafa Cabrera-Bello (14), Matt Fitzpatrick (14), Jim Furyk (14), Branden Grace (14), Justin Harding (14), J. B. Holmes (14), Charles Howell III (14), Kevin Kisner (14), Li Haotong (14), Luke List, Shane Lowry (14), Keith Mitchell (14), Alex Norén (14), Thorbjørn Olesen (14), Louis Oosthuizen (14), Pan Cheng-tsung (14), Ian Poulter (14), Chez Reavie, Adam Scott (14), Brandt Snedeker (14), Matt Wallace (14)

- Eddie Pepperell (14) did not play due to a back injury.

14. The top 60 point leaders and ties as of June 10, 2019 in the Official World Golf Ranking

Emiliano Grillo, Scott Piercy, Andrew Putnam

15. Special exemptions given by the USGA

Ernie Els

The remaining contestants earned their places through sectional qualifiers. Each site has n spots allocated amongst m players denoted (n/m).

- Milton, Ontario, Canada (4/37): Tom Hoge, Nate Lashley, Alex Prugh, Sepp Straka
- Surrey, England (14/110): Adri Arnaus, Merrick Bremner, Dean Burmester, Rhys Enoch, Marcus Fraser, Daniel Hillier (a), Sam Horsfield, Marcus Kinhult, Renato Paratore, Matthieu Pavon, Thomas Pieters, Lee Slattery, Clément Sordet, Justin Walters
- Mie Prefecture, Japan (3/33): Mikumu Horikawa, Kodai Ichihara, Shugo Imahira
- United States

- Newport Beach, California (5/99): Stewart Hagestad (a), Andreas Halvorsen (L), Richard H. Lee (L), Hayden Shieh (L), Kevin Yu (a)
- Bowling Green, Florida (3/56): Luis Gagne, Mito Pereira (L), Callum Tarren
- Ball Ground, Georgia (4/67): Roberto Castro, Chandler Eaton (a,L), Noah Norton (a,L), Ollie Schniederjans
- Rockville, Maryland (4/63): Connor Arendell (L), Joseph Bramlett, Billy Hurley III, Ryan Sullivan (L)
- Purchase, New York (4/73): Rob Oppenheim, Matt Parziale (a), Andy Pope, Cameron Young (a)
- Columbus, Ohio (14/121): Aaron Baddeley, Luke Donald, Jason Dufner, Ryan Fox, Luke Guthrie, Chesson Hadley, Anirban Lahiri, Lee Kyoung-hoon, Collin Morikawa, Rory Sabbatini, Sam Saunders, Erik van Rooyen, Jhonattan Vegas, Brandon Wu (a)
- Springfield, Ohio (5/73): Zac Blair, Brett Drewitt (L), Nick Hardy (L), Chip McDaniel (L), Brian Stuard
- Dallas, Texas (10/102): Charlie Danielson (L), Brian Davis, Austin Eckroat (a), Julián Etulain, Matt Jones, Carlos Ortiz, Scottie Scheffler, Nick Taylor, Brendon Todd, Mike Weir
- Walla Walla, Washington (3/55): Eric Dietrich (L), Matthew Naumec (L), Spencer Tibbits (a,L)

(a) denotes amateur
(L) denotes player advanced through local qualifying

Alternates who gained entry:

- Cody Gribble (Texas) – spot reallocated from England qualifier
- Chan Kim (Japan) – spot reallocated from England qualifier
- Joel Dahmen (Columbus) – claimed spot held for category 9 or 14
- Harris English (Ontario) – claimed spot held for category 9 or 14
- Bernd Wiesberger (England) – claimed spot held for category 9 or 14

== Weather ==
- Thursday: Partly cloudy, with a high of 67 °F/19 °C. Wind W 11 mph.
- Friday: Mostly overcast, with a high of 61 °F/16 °C. Wind W 6-12 mph.
- Saturday: Overcast, with a high of 59 °F/15 °C. WNW wind 5-10 mph, with gusts to 15 mph.
- Sunday: Partly cloudy. High of 61 °F/16 °C. Wind W 7-14 mph.

== Round summaries ==
=== First round ===
Thursday, June 13, 2019

2013 champion Justin Rose birdied his final three holes to shoot 65 (−6), equaling the record for lowest round shot in a U.S. Open at Pebble Beach, and taking a one-shot lead. Xander Schauffele eagled the 18th hole to join Rickie Fowler, Louis Oosthuizen and Aaron Wise in a tie for second. Two-time defending champion Brooks Koepka birdied four of his first six holes before falling back to two-under and a tie for 16th. Seventeen eagles were made during the round, a new U.S. Open record.

Place	Player	Score	To par
1	(England) Justin Rose	65	−6
T2	(United States) Rickie Fowler	66	−5
T2	(South Africa) Louis Oosthuizen	66	−5
T2	(United States) Xander Schauffele	66	−5
T2	(United States) Aaron Wise	66	−5
T6	(United States) Nate Lashley	67	−4
T6	(United States) Scott Piercy	67	−4
T8	(Argentina) Emiliano Grillo	68	−3
T8	(United States) Chesson Hadley	68	−3
T8	(Northern Ireland) Rory McIlroy	68	−3
T8	(Italy) Francesco Molinari	68	−3
T8	(United States) Chez Reavie	68	−3
T8	(Sweden) Henrik Stenson	68	−3
T8	(Austria) Sepp Straka	68	−3
T8	(United States) Gary Woodland	68	−3

=== Second round ===
Friday, June 14, 2019

Gary Woodland holed a 50-foot birdie putt on the 9th hole, the last of his round, to post a bogey-free round of 65 (−6) and take a two-shot lead. His 36-hole score of nine-under ties Gil Morgan in 1992 for lowest in a U.S. Open at Pebble Beach. First-round leader Justin Rose was in second place after a round of 70 (−1). Louis Oosthuizen was tied for the lead but had just one par on his back-nine, making four birdies and four bogeys to finish three shots behind. Rory McIlroy got to within a shot of the lead before a bogey at the 13th and double bogey at the par-5 14th, falling into a tie for fourth place and four behind. Brooks Koepka became the first defending champion since 1988 to begin his title defense with two sub-70 rounds and was part of a group tied for sixth, five behind.

Place	Player	Score	To par
1	(United States) Gary Woodland	68-65=133	−9
2	(England) Justin Rose	65-70=135	−7
3	(South Africa) Louis Oosthuizen	66-70=136	−6
T4	(Northern Ireland) Rory McIlroy	68-69=137	−5
T4	(United States) Aaron Wise	66-71=137	−5
T6	(United States) Chesson Hadley	68-70=138	−4
T6	(United States) Brooks Koepka	69-69=138	−4
T6	(United States) Matt Kuchar	69-69=138	−4
T6	(United States) Chez Reavie	68-70=138	−4
T6	(England) Matt Wallace	70-68=138	−4

Amateurs: Wu (−2), Eaton (E), Hovland (E), Thorbjornsen (+2), Tibbits (+3), Rebula (+4), Eckroat (+5), Yu (+5), Hagestad (+7), Hillier (+7), O'Connell (+8), Parziale (+9), Young (+9), Norton (+13), Bling (+20)

=== Third round ===
Saturday, June 15, 2019

Gary Woodland, the 36-hole leader, was two-under par through 11 holes before finding trouble on the par-3 12th, hitting his tee shot into the rough. Still, off the green after his second shot, he made a 33-foot chip shot to save par. At the par-5 14th, his fourth shot almost rolled back down off the green but managed to stop just short. He then made a 42-foot putt to save par yet again. He parred the last four holes to shoot 69 (−2) and take a one-shot lead into the final round. Justin Rose got up-and-down from a greenside bunker for birdie at the par-5 18th to get to 10-under, a shot behind Woodland.

Louis Oosthuizen birdied three holes in a row from the 15th to the 17th to get into a tie for third with Chez Reavie and two-time defending champion Brooks Koepka, four shots behind. Koepka didn't make a bogey in a round of 68 (−3).

Place	Player	Score	To par
1	(United States) Gary Woodland	68-65-69=202	−11
2	(England) Justin Rose	65-70-68=203	−10
T3	(United States) Brooks Koepka	69-69-68=206	−7
T3	(South Africa) Louis Oosthuizen	66-70-70=206	−7
T3	(United States) Chez Reavie	68-70-68=206	−7
6	(Northern Ireland) Rory McIlroy	68-69-70=207	−6
T7	(United States) Chesson Hadley	68-70-70=208	−5
T7	(United States) Matt Kuchar	69-69-70=208	−5
T9	(Northern Ireland) Graeme McDowell	69-70-70=209	−4
T9	(Spain) Jon Rahm	69-70-70=209	−4
T9	(Sweden) Henrik Stenson	68-71-70=209	−4
T9	(England) Matt Wallace	70-68-71=209	−4
T9	(England) Danny Willett	71-71-67=209	−4

Amateurs: Wu (−2), Hovland (E), Eaton (+2), Thorbjornsen (+15)

=== Final round ===
Sunday, June 16, 2019

==== Summary ====
Gary Woodland, who came into the final round with a one-shot lead, birdied two of his first three holes and, despite a bogey at the 9th, still led by two making the turn. Brooks Koepka was four-under through five holes but failed to birdie the par-5 6th from a greenside bunker and missed a six-foot putt for birdie at the 7th to trail by two going to the back-nine. At the par-5 14th hole, Woodland went for the green from 264 yards out, his 3-wood just clearing the bunker in front of the green and settling on the hill to the left of the green where he was able to make birdie. Koepka, meanwhile, failed to birdie the same hole after driving into the rough and hitting his third shot onto the same hill.

Woodland sinking the winning putt followed by the trophy presentation

Still leading by two heading to the par-3 17th, Woodland's tee shot finished on the fringe, 90 feet away from the hole. Forced to chip because of the mound dividing the green, he got his second shot to within 3 feet to save par. Koepka's approach at the par-5 18th went over the green where he failed to get up-and-down for birdie, missing a 9-foot putt to finish at 10-under. Now needing only a bogey at the last to win, Woodland hit an iron off the tee and laid up with his second shot. His third found the green 30 feet to the right of the flag, and he made the putt to shoot a final-round 69 (−2) and finish three shots ahead of Koepka at 13-under.

Justin Rose, one back at the start of the round, played his final 11 holes in 4-over and fell back to a tie for third place with Jon Rahm, Chez Reavie, and Xander Schauffele. Amateur Viktor Hovland finished at 4-under 280, breaking Jack Nicklaus's record for lowest score by an amateur in the U.S. Open; he finished tied for 12th, which was the best by an amateur since Jim Simons tied for 5th in 1971.

==== Final leaderboard ====
Champion
Silver Cup winner (leading amateur)
(a) = amateur
(c) = past champion

Place	Player	Score	To par	Money ($)
1	(United States) Gary Woodland	68-65-69-69=271	−13	2,250,000
2	(United States) Brooks Koepka (c)	69-69-68-68=274	−10	1,350,000
T3	(Spain) Jon Rahm	69-70-70-68=277	−7	581,872
T3	(United States) Chez Reavie	68-70-68-71=277	−7	581,872
T3	(England) Justin Rose (c)	65-70-68-74=277	−7	581,872
T3	(United States) Xander Schauffele	66-73-71-67=277	−7	581,872
T7	(South Africa) Louis Oosthuizen	66-70-70-72=278	−6	367,387
T7	(Australia) Adam Scott	70-69-71-68=278	−6	367,387
T9	(United States) Chesson Hadley	68-70-70-71=279	−5	288,715
T9	(Northern Ireland) Rory McIlroy (c)	68-69-70-72=279	−5	288,715
T9	(Sweden) Henrik Stenson	68-71-70-70=279	−5	288,715

Leaderboard below the top 10
Place	Player	Score	To par	Money ($)
T12	(England) Matt Fitzpatrick	69-71-72-68=280	−4	226,609
T12	(Norway) Viktor Hovland (a)	69-73-71-67=280	−4	0
T12	(England) Matt Wallace	70-68-71-71=280	−4	226,609
T12	(England) Danny Willett	71-71-67-71=280	−4	226,609
T16	(South Korea) An Byeong-hun	70-72-68-71=281	−3	172,455
T16	(United States) Matt Kuchar	69-69-70-73=281	−3	172,455
T16	(Northern Ireland) Graeme McDowell (c)	69-70-70-72=281	−3	172,455
T16	(Italy) Francesco Molinari	68-72-71-70=281	−3	172,455
T16	(United States) Webb Simpson (c)	74-68-73-66=281	−3	172,455
T21	(United States) Patrick Cantlay	73-71-68-70=282	−2	117,598
T21	(England) Paul Casey	70-72-73-67=282	−2	117,598
T21	(Australia) Jason Day	70-73-70-69=282	−2	117,598
T21	(England) Tyrrell Hatton	70-74-69-69=282	−2	117,598
T21	(Japan) Hideki Matsuyama	69-73-70-70=282	−2	117,598
T21	(United States) Alex Prugh	75-69-70-68=282	−2	117,598
T21	(United States) Tiger Woods (c)	70-72-71-69=282	−2	117,598
T28	(United States) Jim Furyk (c)	73-67-72-71=283	−1	86,071
T28	(United States) Nate Lashley	67-74-70-72=283	−1	86,071
T28	(Republic of Ireland) Shane Lowry	75-69-70-69=283	−1	86,071
T28	(Austria) Sepp Straka	68-72-76-67=283	−1	86,071
T32	(United States) Billy Horschel	73-70-71-70=284	E	72,928
T32	(Sweden) Marcus Kinhult	74-70-74-66=284	E	72,928
T32	(United States) Patrick Reed	71-73-72-68=284	E	72,928
T35	(United States) Bryson DeChambeau	69-74-73-69=285	+1	57,853
T35	(United States) Jason Dufner	70-71-73-71=285	+1	57,853
T35	(United States) Dustin Johnson (c)	71-69-71-74=285	+1	57,853
T35	(Germany) Martin Kaymer (c)	69-75-71-70=285	+1	57,853
T35	(Australia) Marc Leishman	69-74-70-72=285	+1	57,853
T35	(United States) Collin Morikawa	71-73-72-69=285	+1	57,853
T35	(United States) Aaron Wise	66-71-79-69=285	+1	57,853
T35	(United States) Brandon Wu (a)	71-69-71-74=285	+1	0
T43	(United States) Rickie Fowler	66-77-71-72=286	+2	41,500
T43	(United States) Tom Hoge	71-73-71-71=286	+2	41,500
T43	(United States) Andrew Putnam	73-71-73-69=286	+2	41,500
T43	(Slovakia) Rory Sabbatini	72-71-73-70=286	+2	41,500
T43	(Canada) Nick Taylor	74-70-70-72=286	+2	41,500
T43	(South Africa) Erik van Rooyen	71-73-72-70=286	+2	41,500
T49	(Mexico) Abraham Ancer	74-68-69-76=287	+3	31,385
T49	(United States) Daniel Berger	73-70-74-70=287	+3	31,385
T49	(United States) Kevin Kisner	73-70-75-69=287	+3	31,385
T52	(Spain) Sergio García	69-70-75-74=288	+4	27,181
T52	(United States) Charles Howell III	72-70-74-72=288	+4	27,181
T52	(China) Li Haotong	71-70-72-75=288	+4	27,181
T52	(United States) Phil Mickelson	72-69-75-72=288	+4	27,181
T52	(Mexico) Carlos Ortiz	70-70-75-73=288	+4	27,181
T52	(United States) Scott Piercy	67-72-72-77=288	+4	27,181
T58	(Spain) Adri Arnaus	69-75-73-72=289	+5	25,350
T58	(United States) Charlie Danielson	72-70-77-70=289	+5	25,350
T58	(United States) Chandler Eaton (a)	72-70-73-74=289	+5	0
T58	(United States) Harris English	71-69-76-73=289	+5	25,350
T58	(Argentina) Emiliano Grillo	68-74-74-73=289	+5	25,350
T58	(United States) Zach Johnson	70-69-79-71=289	+5	25,350
T58	(United States) Andy Pope	72-71-75-71=289	+5	25,350
T65	(Spain) Rafa Cabrera-Bello	70-74-74-72=290	+6	23,851
T65	(England) Tommy Fleetwood	71-73-73-73=290	+6	23,851
T65	(United States) Jordan Spieth (c)	72-69-73-76=290	+6	23,851
T65	(United States) Kyle Stanley	71-73-75-71=290	+6	23,851
T65	(United States) Brian Stuard	71-73-74-72=290	+6	23,851
T65	(South Africa) Justin Walters	72-72-77-69=290	+6	23,851
71	(Wales) Rhys Enoch	78-66-71-76=291	+7	22,977
T72	(England) Luke Donald	72-70-77-73=292	+8	22,353
T72	(United States) Billy Hurley III	73-70-73-76=292	+8	22,353
T72	(Australia) Cameron Smith	71-72-77-72=292	+8	22,353
T72	(France) Clément Sordet	76-68-74-74=292	+8	22,353
76	(Austria) Bernd Wiesberger	71-73-78-72=294	+10	21,728
77	(United States) Brandt Snedeker	75-69-74-77=295	+11	21,478
78	(United States) Chip McDaniel	71-73-76-77=297	+13	21,224
79	(United States) Michael Thorbjornsen (a)	71-73-84-76=304	+20	0
CUT	(United States) Joseph Bramlett	73-72=145	+3	
CUT	(United States) Lucas Glover (c)	73-72=145	+3	
CUT	(United States) Nick Hardy	73-72=145	+3	
CUT	(Australia) Matt Jones	74-71=145	+3	
CUT	(United States) Rob Oppenheim	73-72=145	+3	
CUT	(United States) Ollie Schniederjans	75-70=145	+3	
CUT	(England) Lee Slattery	73-72=145	+3	
CUT	(United States) Spencer Tibbits (a)	74-71=145	+3	
CUT	(Argentina) Julián Etulain	76-70=146	+4	
CUT	(United States) Tony Finau	74-72=146	+4	
CUT	(South Africa) Branden Grace	75-71=146	+4	
CUT	(South Africa) Justin Harding	73-73=146	+4	
CUT	(United States) Luke List	74-72=146	+4	
CUT	(United States) Keith Mitchell	76-70=146	+4	
CUT	(England) Ian Poulter	73-73=146	+4	
CUT	(South Africa) Jovan Rebula (a)	70-76=146	+4	
CUT	(United States) Scottie Scheffler	72-74=146	+4	
CUT	(United States) Hayden Shieh	77-69=146	+4	
CUT	(United States) Justin Thomas	73-73=146	+4	
CUT	(United States) Brendon Todd	72-74=146	+4	
CUT	(United States) David Toms	72-74=146	+4	
CUT	(United States) Jimmy Walker	75-71=146	+4	
CUT	(Australia) Aaron Baddeley	72-75=147	+5	
CUT	(South Africa) Dean Burmester	76-71=147	+5	
CUT	(United States) Joel Dahmen	75-72=147	+5	
CUT	(United States) Austin Eckroat (a)	72-75=147	+5	
CUT	(New Zealand) Ryan Fox	74-73=147	+5	
CUT	(United States) Patton Kizzire	80-67=147	+5	
CUT	(Sweden) Alex Norén	75-72=147	+5	
CUT	(France) Matthieu Pavon	73-74=147	+5	
CUT	(United States) Sam Saunders	72-75=147	+5	
CUT	(Taiwan) Kevin Yu (a)	74-73=147	+5	
CUT	(South Africa) Ernie Els (c)	75-73=148	+6	
CUT	(United States) Cody Gribble	74-74=148	+6	
CUT	(Japan) Mikumu Horikawa	73-75=148	+6	
CUT	(Denmark) Thorbjørn Olesen	71-77=148	+6	
CUT	(England) Callum Tarren	73-75=148	+6	
CUT	(Canada) Mike Weir	74-74=148	+6	
CUT	(Thailand) Kiradech Aphibarnrat	75-74=149	+7	
CUT	(United States) Keegan Bradley	73-76=149	+7	
CUT	(Costa Rica) Luis Gagne	71-78=149	+7	
CUT	(United States) Stewart Hagestad (a)	74-75=149	+7	
CUT	(New Zealand) Daniel Hillier (a)	76-73=149	+7	
CUT	(United States) J. B. Holmes	72-77=149	+7	
CUT	(England) Sam Horsfield	75-74=149	+7	
CUT	(United States) Kevin Na	72-77=149	+7	
CUT	(Italy) Renato Paratore	75-74=149	+7	
CUT	(Chile) Mito Pereira	77-72=149	+7	
CUT	(Venezuela) Jhonattan Vegas	72-77=149	+7	
CUT	(United States) Connor Arendell	77-73=150	+8	
CUT	(United States) Luke Guthrie	75-75=150	+8	
CUT	(Japan) Shugo Imahira	75-75=150	+8	
CUT	(South Korea) Kim Si-woo	76-74=150	+8	
CUT	(South Korea) Lee Kyoung-hoon	76-74=150	+8	
CUT	(United States) Richard H. Lee	72-78=150	+8	
CUT	(United States) Kevin O'Connell (a)	76-74=150	+8	
CUT	(United States) Bubba Watson	75-75=150	+8	
CUT	(England) Brian Davis	75-76=151	+9	
CUT	(India) Anirban Lahiri	74-77=151	+9	
CUT	(United States) Matt Parziale (a)	74-77=151	+9	
CUT	(United States) Cameron Young (a)	75-76=151	+9	
CUT	(Australia) Marcus Fraser	73-79=152	+10	
CUT	(United States) Chan Kim	77-75=152	+10	
CUT	(Belgium) Thomas Pieters	76-76=152	+10	
CUT	(United States) Ryan Sullivan	73-79=152	+10	
CUT	(Australia) Brett Drewitt	77-76=153	+11	
CUT	(United States) Matthew Naumec	74-79=153	+11	
CUT	(Taiwan) Pan Cheng-tsung	80-73=153	+11	
CUT	(Japan) Kodai Ichihara	80-74=154	+12	
CUT	(Denmark) Lucas Bjerregaard	80-75=155	+13	
CUT	(United States) Zac Blair	83-72=155	+13	
CUT	(United States) Roberto Castro	78-77=155	+13	
CUT	(United States) Noah Norton (a)	80-75=155	+13	
CUT	(Norway) Andreas Halvorsen	74-82=156	+14	
CUT	(South Africa) Merrick Bremner	79-79=158	+16	
CUT	(United States) Eric Dietrich	83-75=158	+16	
CUT	(United States) Devon Bling (a)	82-80=162	+20	

==== Scorecard ====
Final round

Hole	1	2	3	4	5	6	7	8	9	10	11	12	13	14	15	16	17	18
Par	4	4	4	4	3	5	3	4	4	4	4	3	4	5	4	4	3	5
(United States) Woodland	−11	−12	−13	−13	−13	−13	−13	−13	−12	−12	−12	−11	−11	−12	−12	−12	−12	−13
(United States) Koepka	−8	−8	−9	−10	−11	−11	−11	−10	−10	−10	−11	−10	−10	−10	−10	−10	−10	−10
(Spain) Rahm	−5	−4	−4	−5	−6	−6	−7	−7	−7	−7	−7	−7	−7	−7	−6	−6	−6	−7
(United States) Reavie	−7	−6	−6	−6	−6	−6	−7	−7	−7	−7	−7	−7	−7	−7	−7	−7	−7	−7
(England) Rose	−11	−10	−10	−10	−10	−11	−11	−10	−10	−10	−10	−9	−8	−8	−7	−7	−7	−7
(United States) Schauffele	−4	−4	−4	−5	−6	−7	−7	−6	−7	−8	−8	−8	−7	−8	−8	−8	−7	−7
(South Africa) Oosthuizen	−8	−8	−8	−9	−9	−9	−9	−9	−9	−7	−7	−6	−6	−5	−5	−5	−6	−6
(Australia) Scott	−3	−3	−4	−4	−4	−6	−6	−6	−7	−8	−8	−9	−7	−8	−8	−7	−6	−6
(United States) Hadley	−5	−4	−4	−4	−4	−5	−5	−5	−5	−5	−5	−4	−4	−5	−3	−4	−5	−5
(Northern Ireland) McIlroy	−6	−4	−4	−5	−4	−5	−6	−5	−5	−5	−6	−5	−6	−6	−6	−4	−4	−5
(Sweden) Stenson	−5	−4	−4	−5	−5	−6	−7	−7	−6	−6	−7	−7	−7	−7	−6	−5	−5	−5

Cumulative tournament scores, relative to par

Eagle	Birdie	Bogey	Double bogey

== Media ==
This was the fifth U.S. Open televised by Fox and FS1. During Fox's primetime window in the first round, FS1 offered coverage hosted by Justin Kutcher following the group of Justin Rose, Jordan Spieth and Tiger Woods, and the group of Viktor Hovland, 2018 champion Brooks Koepka, and Francesco Molinari. Due to commitments to baseball and the 2019 FIFA Women's World Cup, there were no plans for similar coverage on FS1 during the remainder of the tournament.
