= 2018 Open Championship =

Tournament information
- Dates: 19–22 July 2018
- Location: Angus, Scotland; 56.497°N 2.717°W
- Courses: Carnoustie Golf Links; Championship Course
- Organized by: The R&A
- Tours: European Tour; PGA Tour; Japan Golf Tour

Statistics
- Par: 71
- Length: 7,402 yards (6,768 m)
- Field: 156 players, 79 after cut
- Cut: 145 (+3)
- Prize fund: $10,500,000 £7,900,000 €9,029,928
- Winner's share: $1,890,000 £1,420,000 €1,625,387

Champion
- (Italy) Francesco Molinari
- 276 (−8)
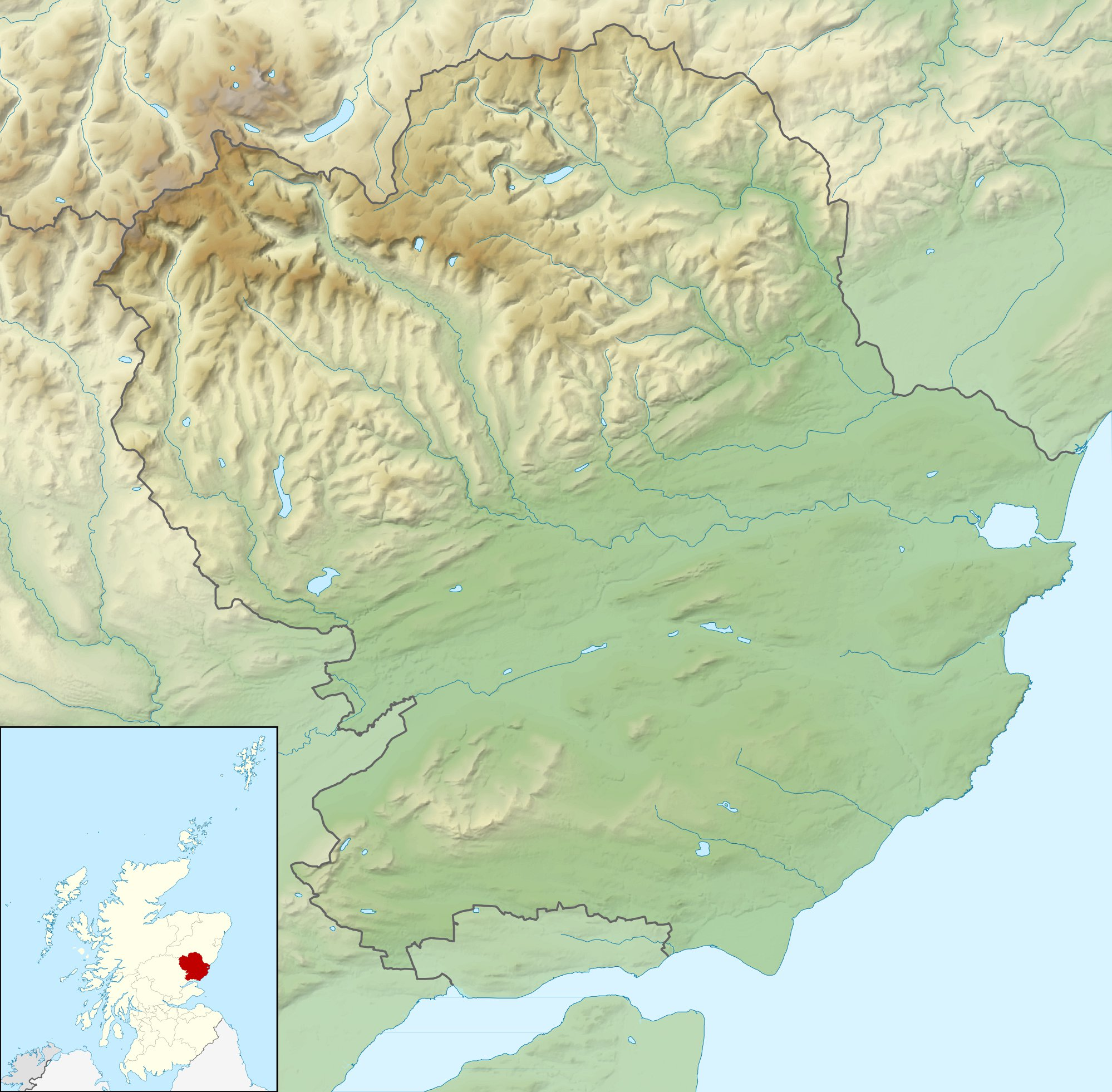
- Location in the United Kingdom Location in Scotland Location in Angus, Scotland

The 2018 Open Championship was the 147th Open Championship and was held from 19–22 July 2018 at Carnoustie Golf Links in Angus, Scotland. It was the eighth Open Championship to be played at Carnoustie.

Playing conditions were unusual as a result of the heatwave in Scotland which had produced brown, dry and sun-baked fairways and brown rough. The fairways played quickly, enabling several players to hit drives that covered over 400 yards.

Francesco Molinari posted a bogey-free final round of 69 to win his first major championship. Molinari finished two shots ahead of Kevin Kisner, Rory McIlroy, Justin Rose and Xander Schauffele. He became the first Italian player to win a major.

== Media ==
The 2018 Open Championship was the third to be televised domestically by Sky Sports on dedicated channel Sky Sports The Open. In the United States, it was the third Open Championship to be televised by NBC (Golf Channel's parent network).

== Venue ==
The 2018 event was the eighth Open Championship played at the Carnoustie Golf Links. The most recent was in 2007, with Pádraig Harrington winning the first of his two consecutive Open titles.

=== Course layout ===
Championship Course

Hole	Name	Yards	Par	Hole	Name	Yards	Par
1	Cup	396	4	10	South America	465	4
2	Gulley	461	4	11	Dyke	382	4
3	Jockie's Burn	350	4	12	Southward Ho	503	4
4	Hillocks	415	4	13	Whins	175	3
5	Brae	412	4	14	Spectacles	513	5
6	Hogan's Alley ^	580	5	15	Lucky Slap	472	4
7	Plantation	410	4	16	Barry Burn	248	3
8	Short	187	3	17	Island	460	4
9	Railway	474	4	18	Home	499	4
Out		3,685	36	In		3,717	35
				Total		7,402	71

^ the 6th hole was named Long until 2003

Lengths of the course for previous Opens:

- 2007: 7,421 yards (6,786 m), par 71
- 1999: 7,361 yards (6,731 m), par 71
- 1975: 7,065 yards (6,460 m), par 72
- 1968: 7,252 yards (6,631 m), par 72
- 1953: 7,200 yards (6,585 m), par 72
- 1937: 7,200 yards (6,585 m), par 72
- 1931: 6,701 yards (6,127 m), par 72

== Field ==
The Open Championship field was made up of 156 players, who gained entry through various exemption criteria and qualifying tournaments. The criteria included past Open champions, recent major winners, top ranked players in the world rankings and from the leading world tours, and winners and high finishers from various designated tournaments, including the Open Qualifying Series; the winners of designated amateur events, including The Amateur Championship and U.S. Amateur, also gained exemption provided they remain an amateur. Anyone not qualifying via exemption, and had a handicap of 0.4 or lower, could gain entry through regional and final qualifying events.

The 2018 Open was the final appearance for 1985 champion Sandy Lyle.

=== Criteria and exemptions ===
Each player is classified according to the first category in which he qualified, but other categories are shown in parentheses. (Note: (a) – indicates the player was an amateur.)

1. The Open Champions aged 60 or under on 22 July 2018

- Mark Calcavecchia
- Stewart Cink (2)
- Darren Clarke (2)
- David Duval
- Ernie Els (2)
- Todd Hamilton
- Pádraig Harrington (2)
- Zach Johnson (2)
- Tom Lehman
- Sandy Lyle
- Rory McIlroy (2,3,4,5,10)
- Phil Mickelson (2,4,15)
- Louis Oosthuizen (2,4,15)
- Jordan Spieth (2,3,4,8,9,12,15)
- Henrik Stenson (2,4,5)
- Tiger Woods
- Eligible but did not enter: Ian Baker-Finch, Ben Curtis, Justin Leonard
- Paul Lawrie and John Daly withdrew before the tournament.

2. The Open Champions for 2008–2017

3. Top 10 finishers and ties in the 2017 Open Championship

- Rafa Cabrera-Bello (4,5)
- Branden Grace (4,5,15)
- Brooks Koepka (4,8,12,15)
- Matt Kuchar (4,12,15)
- Marc Leishman (4,12,15)
- Li Haotong (4,5)
- Alex Norén (4,5,6)
- Matthew Southgate

4. Top 50 players in the Official World Golf Ranking (OWGR) for Week 21, 2018

- Kiradech Aphibarnrat (5)
- Daniel Berger (12,15)
- Patrick Cantlay (12)
- Paul Casey (12)
- Kevin Chappell (12,15)
- Jason Day (10,11,12,15)
- Bryson DeChambeau
- Tony Finau (12)
- Ross Fisher (5)
- Matt Fitzpatrick (5)
- Tommy Fleetwood (5)
- Rickie Fowler (12,15)
- Sergio García (5,9,12)
- Adam Hadwin (12,15)
- Brian Harman (12)
- Tyrrell Hatton (5)
- Charley Hoffman (12,15)
- Dustin Johnson (8,12,15)
- Kim Si-woo (11,15)
- Kevin Kisner (12,15)
- Satoshi Kodaira (20)
- Alexander Lévy (5)
- Hideki Matsuyama (12,15)
- Francesco Molinari (5,6)
- Pat Perez (12)
- Ian Poulter
- Jon Rahm (5,12)
- Patrick Reed (9,12,15)
- Justin Rose (5,12)
- Xander Schauffele (12)
- Charl Schwartzel (5,15)
- Webb Simpson (11,12)
- Cameron Smith
- Kyle Stanley (12)
- Brendan Steele
- Justin Thomas (10,12,15)
- Bubba Watson (9)
- Gary Woodland (12)

5. Top 30 on the 2017 Race to Dubai

- Nicolas Colsaerts
- Paul Dunne
- Dylan Frittelli
- Scott Jamieson
- Shane Lowry
- Thorbjørn Olesen
- Thomas Pieters
- Jordan Smith
- Hideto Tanihara
- Peter Uihlein
- Lee Westwood
- Fabrizio Zanotti
- Bernd Wiesberger did not play due to injury.

6. Last three BMW PGA Championship winners

- Chris Wood

7. Top 5 players, not already exempt, within the top 20 of the 2018 Race to Dubai through the BMW International Open

- Alexander Björk
- Jorge Campillo
- Matt Wallace

8. Last five U.S. Open winners

- Martin Kaymer

9. Last five Masters Tournament winners

- Danny Willett

10. Last five PGA Championship winners

- Jason Dufner (12)
- Jimmy Walker

11. Last three Players Championship winners

12. The 30 qualifiers for the 2017 Tour Championship

- Russell Henley
- Jhonattan Vegas (15)

13. Top 5 players, not already exempt, within the top 20 of the 2018 FedEx Cup points list through the Travelers Championship

- Chesson Hadley
- Patton Kizzire
- Luke List

14. Winner of the 2017 Open de Argentina

- Brady Schnell

15. Playing members of the 2017 Presidents Cup teams

- Emiliano Grillo
- Anirban Lahiri
- Adam Scott

16. Winner of the 2017 Asian Tour Order of Merit

- Gavin Green

17. Winner of the 2017 PGA Tour of Australasia Order of Merit

- Brett Rumford

18. Winner of the 2017–18 Sunshine Tour Order of Merit

- George Coetzee

19. Winner of the 2017 Japan Open

- Yuta Ikeda

20. Top 2 on the 2017 Japan Golf Tour Official Money List

- Yūsaku Miyazato

21. Top 2, not already exempt, on the 2018 Japan Golf Tour Official Money List through the Japan Golf Tour Championship

- Kodai Ichihara
- Ryuko Tokimatsu

22. Winner of the 2017 Senior Open Championship

- Bernhard Langer

23. Winner of the 2018 Amateur Championship

- Jovan Rebula (a)

24. Winner of the 2017 U.S. Amateur

- Doc Redman forfeited his exemption by turning professional in May 2018.

25. Winner of the 2018 European Amateur

- Nicolai Højgaard (a)

26. Recipient of the 2017 Mark H. McCormack Medal

- Joaquín Niemann forfeited his exemption by turning professional in April 2018.

27. Winner of the 2017 Asia-Pacific Amateur Championship

- Lin Yuxin (a)

=== Open Qualifying Series ===
The Open Qualifying Series (OQS) consisted of 11 events from the six major tours and the Korean Tour. Places were available to the leading players (not otherwise exempt) who finish in the top n and ties. In the event of ties, positions went to players ranked highest according to that week's OWGR.

Location	Tournament	Date	Spots	Top	Qualifiers
Australia	Emirates Australian Open	26 Nov	3	10	Jonas Blixt, Cameron Davis, Matt Jones
Africa	Joburg Open	11 Dec	3	10	Shaun Norris, Shubhankar Sharma, Erik van Rooyen
Singapore	SMBC Singapore Open	21 Jan	4	12	Danthai Boonma, Sean Crocker, Lucas Herbert, Jazz Janewattananond
Japan	Mizuno Open	27 May	4	12	Shota Akiyoshi, Michael Hendry, Masahiro Kawamura, Masanori Kobayashi
Korea	Kolon Korea Open	24 Jun	2	8	Choi Min-chel, Park Sang-hyun
France	HNA Open de France	1 Jul	3	10	Marcus Kinhult, Russell Knox, Julian Suri
United States	Quicken Loans National	1 Jul	4	12	Abraham Ancer, Ryan Armour, Bronson Burgoon, Kang Sung-hoon
Ireland	Dubai Duty Free Irish Open	8 Jul	3	10	Ryan Fox, Zander Lombard, Andy Sullivan
United States	A Military Tribute at The Greenbrier	8 Jul	4	12	Austin Cook, Jason Kokrak, Kelly Kraft, Brandt Snedeker
Scotland	Aberdeen Standard Investments Scottish Open	15 Jul	3	10	Jens Dantorp, Eddie Pepperell, Brandon Stone
United States	John Deere Classic	15 Jul	1	5	Michael Kim

=== Final Qualifying ===
The Final Qualifying events were played on 3 July at four courses covering Scotland and the North-West, Central and South-coast regions of England. Three qualifying places were available at each location.

Location	Qualifiers (Note: (R) – indicates a golfer who came through Regional Qualifying.)
Notts (Hollinwell)	Rhys Enoch, Ashton Turner, Oliver Wilson
Prince's	Retief Goosen, Tom Lewis, Haraldur Magnús
St Annes Old Links	Marcus Armitage, James Robinson, Jack Senior
Renaissance Club	Thomas Curtis, Grant Forrest, Sam Locke (a)

=== Alternates ===
To make up the full field of 156, additional places were allocated in ranking order from the Official World Golf Ranking at the time that these places were made available by the Championship Committee.

From the Week 25 (week ending 24 June) Official World Golf Ranking:

- Chez Reavie (ranked 53)
- An Byeong-hun (56)
- Charles Howell III (60)
- Kevin Na (63)
- Beau Hossler (64)
- Ryan Moore (67) (Note: Moore replaced Paul Lawrie.)

From the Week 27 (week ending 8 July) Official World Golf Ranking:

- Andrew Landry (68) (Note: Landry replaced Bernd Wiesberger.)
- Keegan Bradley (75) (Note: Bradley replaced John Daly.)

== Round summaries ==
=== First round ===
Thursday, 19 July 2018

Kevin Kisner opened with 66 (−5) for a one-shot lead over Tony Finau, Zander Lombard, and Erik van Rooyen. Kisner was one-over after his first five holes before making a 40-foot eagle putt at the 6th. He made another 35-footer for birdie at the following hole, and added three straight birdies on the back-nine.

Finau made eight birdies in his round to join Van Rooyen and Lombard in second place. Defending champion Jordan Spieth was 3-under before playing his final four holes in 4-over, including a double bogey at the 15th. He finished with 72 (+1). Three-time champion Tiger Woods, playing at the Open for the first time since 2015, had two early birdies but made three bogeys on the back-nine to finish even-par.

Place	Player	Score	To par
1	(United States) Kevin Kisner	66	−5
T2	(United States) Tony Finau	67	−4
T2	(South Africa) Zander Lombard	67	−4
T2	(South Africa) Erik van Rooyen	67	−4
T5	(United States) Ryan Moore	68	−3
T5	(United States) Brendan Steele	68	−3
T5	(South Africa) Brandon Stone	68	−3
T8	(United States) Russell Henley	69	−2
T8	(United States) Zach Johnson	69	−2
T8	(South Korea) Kang Sung-hoon	69	−2
T8	(Northern Ireland) Rory McIlroy	69	−2
T8	(United States) Pat Perez	69	−2
T8	(Spain) Jon Rahm	69	−2
T8	(United States) Chez Reavie	69	−2
T8	(England) Matthew Southgate	69	−2
T8	(United States) Justin Thomas	69	−2
T8	(England) Danny Willett	69	−2

=== Second round ===
Friday, 20 July 2018

Zach Johnson, the 2015 champion, holed a 30-foot putt at the 18th to post a round of 67 (−4) and tie first round leader Kevin Kisner. Kisner held a two-shot lead playing the 18th, but hit his approach in the burn guarding the green and made double bogey.

Pat Perez, Tommy Fleetwood and Xander Schauffele were a shot behind at five-under. Perez was tied for the lead playing the 18th, but hit into a bunker and made bogey. Fleetwood, runner-up at the U.S. Open after shooting 63 in the final round, shot a bogey-free 65 (−6); Fleetwood owns the course record of 63 at Carnoustie, made at the 2017 Dunhill Links Championship.

Rory McIlroy, the 2014 champion, shot 69 (−2) for a second straight day to join a group two shots out of the lead. Jordan Spieth, one-over after the first round, rebounded with a 4-under 67 to get within three of the lead, while Tiger Woods shot another even-par round.

World No. 1 and 2 Dustin Johnson and Justin Thomas both missed the cut, Johnson making a double bogey at the last while Thomas made three straight double bogeys on the front-nine.

Place	Player	Score	To par
T1	(United States) Zach Johnson	69-67=136	−6
T1	(United States) Kevin Kisner	66-70=136	−6
T3	(England) Tommy Fleetwood	72-65=137	−5
T3	(United States) Pat Perez	69-68=137	−5
T3	(United States) Xander Schauffele	71-66=137	−5
T6	(United States) Tony Finau	67-71=138	−4
T6	(United States) Matt Kuchar	70-68=138	−4
T6	(South Africa) Zander Lombard	67-71=138	−4
T6	(Northern Ireland) Rory McIlroy	69-69=138	−4
T6	(South Africa) Erik van Rooyen	67-71=138	−4

Amateurs: Locke (+3), Højgaard (+6), Lin (+12), Rebula (+16)

=== Third round ===
Saturday, 21 July 2018

Defending champion Jordan Spieth shot a six-under 65 to tie Kevin Kisner and Xander Schauffele for the 54-hole lead. Spieth, beginning the third round three off the lead, drove the green on the par-four 1st and made eagle, and then added a birdie on the 4th to tie. At the 10th, he hit his tee shot into the rough but managed to escape with a birdie, and then made another at 11. He birdied the par-5 14th, and then holed a long birdie putt at the par-3 16th.

Schauffele shot a four-under 67 that included six birdies, finishing his round with a long putt at the 18th from just off the back of the green. Kisner, tied for the lead coming into the round, shot a bogey-free 68 (−3).

Francesco Molinari didn't make a bogey while getting six birdies to shoot 65 (−6) and move to three off of the lead.

Tiger Woods began the round six behind but made three straight birdies on holes 9–11, and then briefly tied for the lead after a birdie at 14. He made bogey on the 16th but managed to save par at the last after his tee shot narrowly missed the burn. He finished with a round of 66 (−5) and was four back.

Zach Johnson was tied with Kisner entering the round but made bogey at 11 and double bogey at the 12th, settling for a one-over round of 72 and falling four shots behind. Justin Rose had the round of the day with 64, tying for the lowest round at an Open Championship at Carnoustie.

Place	Player	Score	To par
T1	(United States) Kevin Kisner	66-70-68=204	−9
T1	(United States) Xander Schauffele	71-66-67=204	−9
T1	(United States) Jordan Spieth	72-67-65=204	−9
4	(United States) Kevin Chappell	70-69-67=206	−7
5	(Italy) Francesco Molinari	70-72-65=207	−6
T6	(England) Tommy Fleetwood	72-65-71=208	−5
T6	(United States) Zach Johnson	69-67-72=208	−5
T6	(United States) Matt Kuchar	70-68-70=208	−5
T6	(Northern Ireland) Rory McIlroy	69-69-70=208	−5
T6	(Sweden) Alex Norén	70-71-67=208	−5
T6	(United States) Webb Simpson	70-71-67=208	−5
T6	(United States) Tiger Woods	71-71-66=208	−5

=== Final round ===
Sunday, 22 July 2018

==== Summary ====
Francesco Molinari shot a bogey-free round of 69 (−2) to become the first Italian to win a major championship. Molinari was three shots behind at the start of the round, and began with 13 straight pars before a birdie at the par-5 14th. He hit his approach close to the pin at the 18th, and converted another birdie to post 8-under. Molinari did not make a bogey in his last 37 holes.

Tiger Woods, paired with Molinari, made two birdies on the front-nine to take solo possession of the lead. At the 11th, however, he hit his tee shot in the rough, and did the same with his approach over the green. His chip shot came up short of the green, and he failed to get up-and-down, settling for a double bogey. He made another bogey at the 12th, and despite getting a birdie at the par-5 14th after chipping from close to the 4th pin on the double green, he finished three shots behind after an even-par 71.

Xander Schauffele was in a three-way tie for the lead at the start of the round, but found trouble at the 5th when his approach shot buried in a greenside bunker. That led to a bogey, and he made another bogey at the 6th after hitting into a bunker once again. At the 7th, Schauffele hit his tee shot into the rough and failed to get out on his second shot. His third went over the green, and he made double bogey. He rebounded with a birdie at the 10th to get back into the lead, and another at the 14th. One shot back of Molinari playing the 17th, Schauffele's approach went well right of the green, and he made bogey to finish two behind.

Kevin Kisner was also tied for the lead, but began his round with a double bogey at the 2nd after having to play sideways out of a fairway bunker. He made three more bogeys on the front-nine for a four-over 40. He began the second nine with a birdie at 10, joining a six-way tie for the lead at six-under. A dropped shot at the 12th, however, saw Kisner fall out of the lead, and he also finished two behind Molinari.

Defending champion Jordan Spieth, tied with Kisner and Schauffele at the start of the round, failed to make a birdie on his way to a five-over 76. He made a bogey at the 5th after hitting into a fairway bunker, then had a double bogey at the 6th after taking an unplayable lie from a bush. He made two more bogeys on the back-nine to finish four shots back.

Rory McIlroy was two-over par after his first eight holes, before birdies at the 9th and 11th. At the 14th, he holed a long putt for eagle to tie for the lead at 6-under. However, he failed to make another birdie the rest of the round, and settled into the four-way tie for second. Justin Rose, who needed a 13-foot birdie at the 18th on Friday just to make the cut, eagled the 14th after his approach hit the flag, then birdied the 18th after another close approach to also finish runner-up.

==== Final leaderboard ====
Champion
Silver Medal winner (low amateur)
(a) = amateur
(c) = past champion

Note: Top 10 and ties qualify for the 2019 Open Championship; top 4 and ties qualify for the 2019 Masters Tournament

Place	Player	Score	To par	Money ($)
1	(Italy) Francesco Molinari	70-72-65-69=276	−8	1,890,000
T2	(United States) Kevin Kisner	66-70-68-74=278	−6	694,250
T2	(Northern Ireland) Rory McIlroy (c)	69-69-70-70=278	−6	694,250
T2	(England) Justin Rose	72-73-64-69=278	−6	694,250
T2	(United States) Xander Schauffele	71-66-67-74=278	−6	694,250
T6	(United States) Kevin Chappell	70-69-67-73=279	−5	327,000
T6	(England) Eddie Pepperell	71-70-71-67=279	−5	327,000
T6	(United States) Tiger Woods (c)	71-71-66-71=279	−5	327,000
T9	(United States) Tony Finau	67-71-71-71=280	−4	219,000
T9	(United States) Matt Kuchar	70-68-70-72=280	−4	219,000
T9	(United States) Jordan Spieth (c)	72-67-65-76=280	−4	219,000

Leaderboard below the top 10
Place	Player	Score	To par	Money ($)
T12	(United States) Patrick Cantlay	70-71-70-70=281	−3	154,500
T12	(England) Tommy Fleetwood	72-65-71-73=281	−3	154,500
T12	(United States) Ryan Moore	68-73-69-71=281	−3	154,500
T12	(Denmark) Thorbjørn Olesen	70-70-70-71=281	−3	154,500
T12	(United States) Webb Simpson	70-71-67-73=281	−3	154,500
T17	(Australia) Jason Day	71-71-72-68=282	−2	109,714
T17	(United States) Charley Hoffman	71-70-68-73=282	−2	109,714
T17	(United States) Zach Johnson (c)	69-67-72-74=282	−2	109,714
T17	(Sweden) Alex Norén	70-71-67-74=282	−2	109,714
T17	(United States) Pat Perez	69-68-74-71=282	−2	109,714
T17	(Australia) Adam Scott	71-70-68-73=282	−2	109,714
T17	(South Africa) Erik van Rooyen	67-71-71-73=282	−2	109,714
T24	(United States) Stewart Cink (c)	72-70-71-70=283	−1	84,000
T24	(Germany) Bernhard Langer	73-71-68-71=283	−1	84,000
T24	(United States) Phil Mickelson (c)	73-69-70-71=283	−1	84,000
T24	(England) Danny Willett	69-71-70-73=283	−1	84,000
T28	(United States) Austin Cook	72-70-67-75=284	E	67,143
T28	(United States) Rickie Fowler	70-69-73-72=284	E	67,143
T28	(South Africa) Louis Oosthuizen (c)	72-70-69-73=284	E	67,143
T28	(Belgium) Thomas Pieters	70-73-70-71=284	E	67,143
T28	(United States) Patrick Reed	75-70-68-71=284	E	67,143
T28	(United States) Julian Suri	74-68-70-71=284	E	67,143
T28	(England) Chris Wood	70-74-66-74=284	E	67,143
T35	(Canada) Adam Hadwin	73-70-71-71=285	+1	53,750
T35	(United States) Michael Kim	73-69-69-74=285	+1	53,750
T35	(Japan) Satoshi Kodaira	72-71-68-74=285	+1	53,750
T35	(Sweden) Henrik Stenson (c)	70-75-71-69=285	+1	53,750
T39	(Australia) Cameron Davis	71-72-73-70=286	+2	41,375
T39	(England) Ross Fisher	75-70-68-73=286	+2	41,375
T39	(New Zealand) Ryan Fox	74-71-71-70=286	+2	41,375
T39	(Japan) Masahiro Kawamura	77-67-71-71=286	+2	41,375
T39	(United States) Brooks Koepka	72-69-75-70=286	+2	41,375
T39	(China) Li Haotong	71-72-67-76=286	+2	41,375
T39	(United States) Luke List	70-70-77-69=286	+2	41,375
T39	(United States) Kyle Stanley	72-69-69-76=286	+2	41,375
T47	(United States) Sean Crocker	71-71-69-76=287	+3	31,000
T47	(England) Tom Lewis	75-70-68-74=287	+3	31,000
T47	(Japan) Yūsaku Miyazato	71-74-65-77=287	+3	31,000
T47	(United States) Brendan Steele	68-76-73-70=287	+3	31,000
T51	(South Korea) An Byeong-hun	73-71-66-78=288	+4	27,161
T51	(England) Paul Casey	73-71-72-72=288	+4	27,161
T51	(United States) Bryson DeChambeau	75-70-73-70=288	+4	27,161
T51	(United States) Jason Dufner	75-70-68-75=288	+4	27,161
T51	(England) Tyrrell Hatton	74-71-72-71=288	+4	27,161
T51	(Australia) Lucas Herbert	73-69-69-77=288	+4	27,161
T51	(Japan) Yuta Ikeda	70-73-71-74=288	+4	27,161
T51	(United States) Kevin Na	70-73-73-72=288	+4	27,161
T51	(India) Shubhankar Sharma	73-71-71-73=288	+4	27,161
60	(Australia) Marc Leishman	72-72-69-76=289	+5	25,800
T61	(Malaysia) Gavin Green	72-73-71-74=290	+6	25,317
T61	(Sweden) Marcus Kinhult	74-69-71-76=290	+6	25,317
T61	(South Africa) Shaun Norris	74-68-69-79=290	+6	25,317
T61	(Australia) Brett Rumford	74-70-72-74=290	+6	25,317
T61	(South Africa) Brandon Stone	68-72-73-77=290	+6	25,317
T61	(England) Lee Westwood	72-72-69-77=290	+6	25,317
T67	(Republic of Ireland) Paul Dunne	71-73-73-74=291	+7	24,250
T67	(Wales) Rhys Enoch	74-71-70-76=291	+7	24,250
T67	(South Korea) Kang Sung-hoon	69-72-72-78=291	+7	24,250
T67	(South Korea) Kim Si-woo	71-72-75-73=291	+7	24,250
T67	(South Africa) Zander Lombard	67-71-71-82=291	+7	24,250
T67	(England) Matthew Southgate	69-72-73-77=291	+7	24,250
T67	(United States) Gary Woodland	71-72-72-76=291	+7	24,250
74	(Spain) Rafa Cabrera-Bello	74-70-76-72=292	+8	23,675
T75	(Thailand) Kiradech Aphibarnrat	74-71-74-74=293	+9	23,488
T75	(United States) Beau Hossler	73-70-77-73=293	+9	23,488
T75	(Scotland) Sam Locke (a)	72-73-70-78=293	+9	0
78	(Australia) Cameron Smith	73-71-73-77=294	+10	23,300
79	(United States) Keegan Bradley	74-71-73-77=295	+11	23,175
CUT	(United States) Daniel Berger	73-73=146	+4	
CUT	(South Africa) George Coetzee	75-71=146	+4	
CUT	(Spain) Sergio García	75-71=146	+4	
CUT	(South Africa) Branden Grace	74-72=146	+4	
CUT	(Germany) Martin Kaymer	71-75=146	+4	
CUT	(Scotland) Russell Knox	73-73=146	+4	
CUT	(United States) Tom Lehman (c)	75-71=146	+4	
CUT	(Japan) Hideki Matsuyama	75-71=146	+4	
CUT	(United States) Chez Reavie	69-77=146	+4	
CUT	(United States) Justin Thomas	69-77=146	+4	
CUT	(United States) Peter Uihlein	74-72=146	+4	
CUT	(England) Matt Wallace	74-72=146	+4	
CUT	(Paraguay) Fabrizio Zanotti	72-74=146	+4	
CUT	(Spain) Jorge Campillo	72-75=147	+5	
CUT	(England) Matt Fitzpatrick	72-75=147	+5	
CUT	(United States) Chesson Hadley	73-74=147	+5	
CUT	(United States) Brian Harman	71-76=147	+5	
CUT	(United States) Kelly Kraft	74-73=147	+5	
CUT	(Republic of Ireland) Shane Lowry	74-73=147	+5	
CUT	(Spain) Jon Rahm	69-78=147	+5	
CUT	(South Africa) Charl Schwartzel	74-73=147	+5	
CUT	(England) Jordan Smith	74-73=147	+5	
CUT	(England) Andy Sullivan	71-76=147	+5	
CUT	(England) Oliver Wilson	75-72=147	+5	
CUT	(United States) Bronson Burgoon	74-74=148	+6	
CUT	(Denmark) Nicolai Højgaard (a)	72-76=148	+6	
CUT	(United States) Dustin Johnson	76-72=148	+6	
CUT	(France) Alexander Lévy	73-75=148	+6	
CUT	(United States) Bubba Watson	75-73=148	+6	
CUT	(Mexico) Abraham Ancer	71-78=149	+7	
CUT	(England) Marcus Armitage	80-69=149	+7	
CUT	(United States) Mark Calcavecchia (c)	73-76=149	+7	
CUT	(South Africa) Ernie Els (c)	73-76=149	+7	
CUT	(United States) Russell Henley	69-80=149	+7	
CUT	(United States) Charles Howell III	75-74=149	+7	
CUT	(Scotland) Scott Jamieson	75-74=149	+7	
CUT	(South Korea) Park Sang-hyun	76-73=149	+7	
CUT	(Japan) Ryuko Tokimatsu	72-77=149	+7	
CUT	(Sweden) Alexander Björk	72-78=150	+8	
CUT	(England) Thomas Curtis	82-68=150	+8	
CUT	(South Africa) Dylan Frittelli	71-79=150	+8	
CUT	(Argentina) Emiliano Grillo	76-74=150	+8	
CUT	(Republic of Ireland) Pádraig Harrington (c)	76-74=150	+8	
CUT	(Japan) Kodai Ichihara	78-72=150	+8	
CUT	(Thailand) Jazz Janewattananond	74-76=150	+8	
CUT	(United States) Jason Kokrak	72-78=150	+8	
CUT	(India) Anirban Lahiri	76-74=150	+8	
CUT	(Iceland) Haraldur Magnús	72-78=150	+8	
CUT	(Japan) Hideto Tanihara	75-75=150	+8	
CUT	(Venezuela) Jhonattan Vegas	76-74=150	+8	
CUT	(United States) Jimmy Walker	72-78=150	+8	
CUT	(Japan) Shota Akiyoshi	77-74=151	+9	
CUT	(United States) Ryan Armour	75-76=151	+9	
CUT	(South Africa) Retief Goosen	74-77=151	+9	
CUT	(United States) Todd Hamilton (c)	75-76=151	+9	
CUT	(New Zealand) Michael Hendry	73-78=151	+9	
CUT	(Australia) Matt Jones	75-76=151	+9	
CUT	(United States) Patton Kizzire	77-74=151	+9	
CUT	(Scotland) Sandy Lyle (c)	75-76=151	+9	
CUT	(Thailand) Danthai Boonma	78-74=152	+10	
CUT	(Sweden) Jonas Blixt	77-76=153	+11	
CUT	(South Korea) Choi Min-chel	79-74=153	+11	
CUT	(Belgium) Nicolas Colsaerts	79-74=153	+11	
CUT	(Scotland) Grant Forrest	80-73=153	+11	
CUT	(Japan) Masanori Kobayashi	82-72=154	+12	
CUT	(China) Lin Yuxin (a)	80-74=154	+12	
CUT	(England) Ian Poulter	73-81=154	+12	
CUT	(United States) Brady Schnell	79-75=154	+12	
CUT	(United States) Brandt Snedeker	76-78=154	+12	
CUT	(England) Jack Senior	79-76=155	+13	
CUT	(England) Ashton Turner	78-77=155	+13	
CUT	(England) James Robinson	75-81=156	+14	
CUT	(United States) Andrew Landry	80-77=157	+15	
CUT	(Sweden) Jens Dantorp	76-82=158	+16	
CUT	(South Africa) Jovan Rebula (a)	79-79=158	+16	
CUT	(Northern Ireland) Darren Clarke (c)	82-83=165	+23	
WD	(United States) David Duval (c)	80	+9	

==== Scorecard ====
Hole	1	2	3	4	5	6	7	8	9	10	11	12	13	14	15	16	17	18
Par	4	4	4	4	4	5	4	3	4	4	4	4	3	5	4	3	4	4
(Italy) Molinari	−6	−6	−6	−6	−6	−6	−6	−6	−6	−6	−6	−6	−6	−7	−7	−7	−7	−8
(United States) Kisner	−9	−7	−6	−6	−6	−7	−6	−5	−5	−6	−6	−5	−5	−6	−6	−6	−6	−6
(Northern Ireland) McIlroy	−5	−4	−4	−4	−3	−3	−3	−3	−4	−4	−5	−4	−4	−6	−6	−6	−6	−6
(England) Rose	−4	−4	−4	−4	−3	−3	−3	−3	−3	−3	−3	−3	−3	−5	−5	−5	−5	−6
(United States) Schauffele	−9	−9	−9	−9	−8	−7	−5	−5	−5	−6	−6	−6	−6	−7	−7	−7	−6	−6
(United States) Chappell	−6	−6	−6	−6	−6	−5	−5	−5	−5	−6	−6	−6	−6	−6	−6	−6	−4	−5
(England) Pepperell	−1	−1	−2	−2	−3	−4	−4	−3	−3	−3	−3	−3	−3	−4	−4	−4	−5	−5
(United States) Woods	−5	−5	−5	−6	−6	−7	−7	−7	−7	−7	−5	−4	−4	−5	−5	−5	−5	−5
(United States) Finau	−4	−4	−4	−4	−4	−4	−4	−3	−3	−3	−3	−3	−3	−4	−4	−4	−4	−4
(United States) Kuchar	−4	−4	−3	−3	−4	−4	−5	−4	−4	−4	−3	−3	−3	−4	−4	−4	−4	−4
(United States) Spieth	−9	−9	−9	−9	−8	−6	−6	−6	−6	−6	−6	−6	−6	−6	−5	−5	−4	−4

Cumulative tournament scores, relative to par

Eagle	Birdie	Bogey	Double bogey
