= Chip McDaniel =

American professional golfer (born 1995)

Personal information
- Full name: Tyler McDaniel
- Nickname: Chip
- Nationality: United States
- Born: October 12, 1995 (age 31)

Career
- Sport: Golf
- College: University of Kentucky
- Turned professional: 2018

Best results in major championships
- Masters Tournament: DNP
- PGA Championship: DNP
- U.S. Open: 78th: 2019
- The Open Championship: DNP

Tyler "Chip" McDaniel (born October 12, 1995) is an American professional golfer.

McDaniel played college golf at the University of Kentucky, winning three events. He also won the Kentucky State Amateur in 2013 and 2017 and the Junior PGA Championship in 2013.

McDaniel turned professional in 2018 after graduating. He qualified for the 2019 U.S. Open by finishing first in sectional qualifying. At the U.S. Open, he made the cut and finished 78th.

== Amateur wins ==
- 2011 Evitt Foundation RTC Junior All-Star
- 2012 Kearney Hill Golf Links
- 2013 PGA Junior Series Kearney Hill, Kentucky State Amateur, Junior PGA Championship
- 2014 Quail Valley Collegiate Invitational
- 2015 The Grove Intercollegiate
- 2017 Kentucky State Amateur, Bearcat Invitational

== Professional wins ==
- 2018 Governor's Open

== Results in major championships ==
Tournament	2019
Masters Tournament	
PGA Championship	
U.S. Open	78
The Open Championship	

Did not play

CUT = missed the half-way cut
