= 2019 Masters Tournament =

Golf tournament held in 2019

- Front cover of the 2019 Masters Journal

Tournament information
- Dates: April 11–14, 2019
- Location: Augusta, Georgia, U.S. 33.503°N 82.020°W
- Course: Augusta National Golf Club
- Tours: PGA Tour; European Tour; Japan Golf Tour

Statistics
- Par: 72
- Length: 7,475 yards (6,835 m)
- Field: 87 players, 65 after cut
- Cut: 147 (+3)
- Prize fund: $11,500,000
- Winner's share: $2,070,000

Champion
- (United States) Tiger Woods
- 275 (−13)
- Location in the United States Location in Georgia

The 2019 Masters Tournament was the 83rd edition of the Masters Tournament and the first of golf's four major championships in 2019, held between April 11 and 14 at Augusta National Golf Club in Augusta, Georgia.

Tiger Woods won his fifth green jacket, and fifteenth major, by one stroke ahead of three runners-up. It left him one shy of Jack Nicklaus's record six Masters wins, and three short of his record eighteen major wins. At age 43, he became the eleventh oldest player to win a major, and the second oldest Masters winner, again only bettered by Nicklaus who won at age 46. It was 11 years after his last major win, the 2008 U.S. Open, and 14 years after his last Masters win, beating the previous record of 13 years held by Gary Player. Due to the high profile of Woods, and his storied fall from the top of the game due to personal issues and injuries, the victory generated a large amount of publicity around the world, and is regarded as one of the great comebacks in the history of sports.

Woods only emerged to lead the tournament in the final round, when Francesco Molinari, who had been leading the tournament, hit his ball into the water on the 12th hole and then again on the 15th after hitting a tree. It was the first time Woods won a major when not leading after the 54th hole.

Most of the media, and the Las Vegas bookmakers, placed Rory McIlroy, Justin Rose, and Dustin Johnson the pre-tournament favorites. McIlroy, the only player to finish in the top ten in the previous five Masters, came into the tournament as the Players champion and with seven consecutive top-10 PGA Tour finishes, but could only finish tied for 21st. Two-time runner-up Rose came in as world number one, but missed the cut. Johnson, who came in as world number two, and had a dominant win in the 2019 WGC-Mexico Championship, finished tied for second.

A Masters record 65 players made the cut, including three amateurs. The leading amateur, and winner of the Silver Cup, was Norwegian Viktor Hovland who had qualified as the U.S. Amateur champion. He finished tied for 32nd at 3-under-par.

It was also the first time three players had shot 64 or better in a single round at the Masters, as Patrick Cantlay, Tony Finau, and Webb Simpson all shot 64 in the third round. This was partly attributed by the media to the soft conditions, lack of wind and accessible pin positions.

== Course ==
Hole	Name	Yards	Par	Hole	Name	Yards	Par
1	Tea Olive	445	4	10	Camellia	495	4
2	Pink Dogwood	575	5	11	White Dogwood	505	4
3	Flowering Peach	350	4	12	Golden Bell	155	3
4	Flowering Crab Apple	240	3	13	Azalea	510	5
5	Magnolia	495	4	14	Chinese Fir	440	4
6	Juniper	180	3	15	Firethorn	530	5
7	Pampas	450	4	16	Redbud	170	3
8	Yellow Jasmine	570	5	17	Nandina	440	4
9	Carolina Cherry	460	4	18	Holly	465	4
Out		3,765	36	In		3,710	36
Source:				Total		7,475	72

- The fifth hole (Magnolia) was lengthened by 40 yards (37 m) for this edition.

== Field ==
The Masters has the smallest field of the four major championships. Officially, the Masters remains an invitation event, but there is a set of qualifying criteria that determines who is included in the field. Each player is classified according to the first category by which he qualified, with other categories in which he qualified shown in parentheses.

Golfers who qualify based solely on their performance in amateur tournaments (categories 6–10) must remain amateurs on the starting day of the tournament to be eligible to play.

1. Past Masters Champions

Ángel Cabrera, Fred Couples, Sergio García (17,18), Trevor Immelman, Zach Johnson (3), Bernhard Langer, Sandy Lyle, Phil Mickelson (15,16,17,18), Larry Mize, José María Olazábal, Patrick Reed (11,12,16,17,18), Charl Schwartzel, Adam Scott (14,17,18), Vijay Singh, Jordan Spieth (2,3,11,17,18), Bubba Watson (11,15,16,17,18), Mike Weir, Danny Willett, Tiger Woods (14,15,16,17,18), Ian Woosnam

- Past champions who did not play: Tommy Aaron, Jack Burke Jr., Charles Coody, Ben Crenshaw, Nick Faldo, Raymond Floyd, Bob Goalby, Jack Nicklaus, Mark O'Meara, Gary Player, Craig Stadler, Tom Watson, Fuzzy Zoeller.

2. Last five U.S. Open Champions

Dustin Johnson (11,12,15,16,17,18), Martin Kaymer, Brooks Koepka (4,12,14,15,16,17,18)

3. Last five Open Champions

Rory McIlroy (4,5,11,13,15,16,17,18), Francesco Molinari (13,15,16,17,18), Henrik Stenson (11,17,18)

4. Last five PGA Champions

Jason Day (5,15,16,17,18), Justin Thomas (15,16,17,18), Jimmy Walker

5. Last four winners of The Players Championship

Kim Si-woo, Webb Simpson (15,16,17,18)

6. Top two finishers in the 2018 U.S. Amateur

Devon Bling (a), Viktor Hovland (a)

7. Winner of the 2018 Amateur Championship

Jovan Rebula (a)

8. Winner of the 2018 Asia-Pacific Amateur Championship

Takumi Kanaya (a)

9. Winner of the 2018 U.S. Mid-Amateur

Kevin O'Connell (a)

10. Winner of the 2019 Latin America Amateur Championship

Álvaro Ortiz (a)

11. The top 12 finishers and ties in the 2018 Masters Tournament

Tony Finau (16,17,18), Rickie Fowler (15,16,17,18), Charley Hoffman, Marc Leishman (15,16,17,18), Louis Oosthuizen (17,18), Jon Rahm (14,16,17,18), Justin Rose (13,15,16,17,18), Cameron Smith (16,17,18)

12. Top 4 finishers and ties in the 2018 U.S. Open

Tommy Fleetwood (16,17,18)

13. Top 4 finishers and ties in the 2018 Open Championship

Kevin Kisner (15,17,18), Xander Schauffele (15,16,17,18)

14. Top 4 finishers and ties in the 2018 PGA Championship

Stewart Cink

15. Winners of PGA Tour events that award a full-point allocation for the FedEx Cup, between the 2018 Masters Tournament and the 2019 Masters Tournament

Keegan Bradley (16,17,18), Paul Casey (16,17,18), Corey Conners, Bryson DeChambeau (16,17,18), J. B. Holmes (18), Charles Howell III (18), Michael Kim, Satoshi Kodaira (17), Matt Kuchar (17,18), Andrew Landry, Adam Long, Keith Mitchell, Kevin Na (16,17), Brandt Snedeker (17,18), Kevin Tway, Aaron Wise (16)

16. All players qualifying for the 2018 edition of The Tour Championship

Patrick Cantlay (17,18), Billy Horschel (17,18), Patton Kizzire, Hideki Matsuyama (17,18), Kyle Stanley (17,18), Gary Woodland (17,18)

17. Top 50 on the final 2018 Official World Golf Ranking list

Kiradech Aphibarnrat (18), Lucas Bjerregaard (18), Rafa Cabrera-Bello (18), Matt Fitzpatrick (18), Branden Grace (18), Emiliano Grillo, Tyrrell Hatton (18), Li Haotong (18), Alex Norén (18), Thorbjørn Olesen, Eddie Pepperell (18), Ian Poulter (18), Matt Wallace (18)

18. Top 50 on the Official World Golf Ranking list on April 1, 2019

Justin Harding, Shane Lowry

19. International invitees

Shugo Imahira

== Par 3 contest ==
Wednesday, April 10, 2019

Matt Wallace won the par-3 contest on the third playoff hole against Sandy Lyle after both players finished with a score of 22 (−5). Wallace made a hole-in-one on the 8th hole, while three other aces were recorded by Mark O'Meara, Shane Lowry, and amateur Devon Bling. Wallace missed the 36-hole cut by five strokes.

== Weather ==
Thursday: Partly cloudy. High of 84 °F/29 °C. Wind SE 10-15 mph.

Friday: Mostly cloudy with scattered showers. High of 84 °F/29 °C. Wind SSE 5-10 mph. Play was suspended at 5:05 p.m. due to dangerous weather and resumed at 5:34 p.m., a delay of 29 minutes.

Saturday: Mostly cloudy. High of 85 °F/29 °C. Wind SE 5-10 mph.

Sunday: Play began at 7:30 a.m. due to threat of thunderstorms. Cloudy with scattered showers. High of 80 °F/27 °C. Wind SSE 15-20 mph, with gusts to 25 mph.

== Round summaries ==
=== First round ===
Thursday, April 11, 2019

Bryson DeChambeau and reigning PGA Championship and U.S. Open champion Brooks Koepka tied for the lead at 66 (−6). DeChambeau's round included six birdies in his final seven holes. One stroke behind was three-time Masters champion Phil Mickelson with world number two Dustin Johnson and Ian Poulter two behind. Ten players were tied for 11th place at 70 (−2), including two of the pre-tournament favorites, Rickie Fowler and Tiger Woods. Defending champion Patrick Reed opened with 73 (+1).

Place	Player	Score	To par
T1	(United States) Bryson DeChambeau	66	−6
T1	(United States) Brooks Koepka	66	−6
3	(United States) Phil Mickelson	67	−5
T4	(United States) Dustin Johnson	68	−4
T4	(England) Ian Poulter	68	−4
T6	(Thailand) Kiradech Aphibarnrat	69	−3
T6	(South Africa) Justin Harding	69	−3
T6	(United States) Kevin Kisner	69	−3
T6	(Spain) Jon Rahm	69	−3
T6	(Australia) Adam Scott	69	−3

=== Second round ===
Friday, April 12, 2019

Five players, all major champions, shared the lead at the end of the second day. First-round co-leader Brooks Koepka struggled early with two bogeys and a double, but recovered with three birdies to score 71 (−1). Jason Day and Francesco Molinari both scored 67 (−5), while Louis Oosthuizen shot the second best round of the day, 66 (−6). 2013 champion Adam Scott shot a 68 (−4) that included an eagle on the par-5 15th. In the group one back were Dustin Johnson, Tiger Woods, and Xander Schauffele, the last of whom shot a 65 (−7), the lowest round of the first two days. Woods, seeking his first major since the 2008 U.S. Open, made two front-nine bogeys in a round of 68 (−4). The other first round co-leader, Bryson DeChambeau, struggled with a 75 (+3) while Phil Mickelson followed up his opening round 67 (−5) with a 73 (+1).

There was a 29-minute delay during the afternoon because of thunderstorms in the area. Players remained on the course during the delay. The Masters has a "10 shot rule" whereby all players within 10 shots of the leaders make the 36-hole cut. With the leaders on 137 (−7) the cut was at 147 (+3). 65 players made the cut, the most since the cut was introduced in 1957. Four amateurs made the cut, the most since 1999. World number one Justin Rose was among the players to miss the cut, his first missed cut in his 14th appearance. Also missing the cut was 1991 Masters Champion Ian Woosnam, who announced his retirement as an active Masters competitor shortly after completion of play.

Place	Player	Score	To par
T1	(Australia) Jason Day	70-67=137	−7
T1	(United States) Brooks Koepka	66-71=137	−7
T1	(Italy) Francesco Molinari	70-67=137	−7
T1	(South Africa) Louis Oosthuizen	71-66=137	−7
T1	(Australia) Adam Scott	69-68=137	−7
T6	(South Africa) Justin Harding	69-69=138	−6
T6	(United States) Dustin Johnson	68-70=138	−6
T6	(United States) Xander Schauffele	73-65=138	−6
T6	(United States) Tiger Woods	70-68=138	−6
T10	(England) Ian Poulter	68-71=139	−5
T10	(Spain) Jon Rahm	69-70=139	−5

Amateurs: Hovland (−1), Ortiz (E), Bling (+3), Kanaya (+3), O'Connell (+4), Rebula (+8)

=== Third round ===
Saturday, April 13, 2019

Francesco Molinari, part of a five-way tie for the lead at the start of the round, made four straight birdies from holes 12 to 15 on his way to a round of 66 (−6) and a two-shot lead after 54 holes. Tony Finau began his round with three straight birdies and made an eagle at the par-5 8th hole, tying the Masters record with 30 on the front-nine. He ended up with a round of 64 (−8), one off the course record, to jump into a tie for second. Four-time Masters champion Tiger Woods was one-over through 5 holes before birdieing 6 to 8, and after three more birdies on the back-nine shot 67 (−5) to join Finau at 11 under par.

Webb Simpson and Patrick Cantlay also shot 64, the first time in Masters history three rounds of 64 or better were shot on the same day. The field combined to shoot 80-under for the round, the lowest in tournament history.

Place	Player	Score	To par
1	(Italy) Francesco Molinari	70-67-66=203	−13
T2	(United States) Tony Finau	71-70-64=205	−11
T2	(United States) Tiger Woods	70-68-67=205	−11
4	(United States) Brooks Koepka	66-71-69=206	−10
T5	(England) Ian Poulter	68-71-68=207	−9
T5	(United States) Webb Simpson	72-71-64=207	−9
T7	(South Africa) Justin Harding	69-69-70=208	−8
T7	(United States) Dustin Johnson	68-70-70=208	−8
T7	(United States) Matt Kuchar	71-69-68=208	−8
T7	(South Africa) Louis Oosthuizen	71-66-71=208	−8
T7	(United States) Xander Schauffele	73-65-70=208	−8

Amateurs: Hovland (−2), Kanaya (−1), Ortiz (+1), Bling (+2)

=== Final round ===
Sunday, April 14, 2019

==== Summary ====
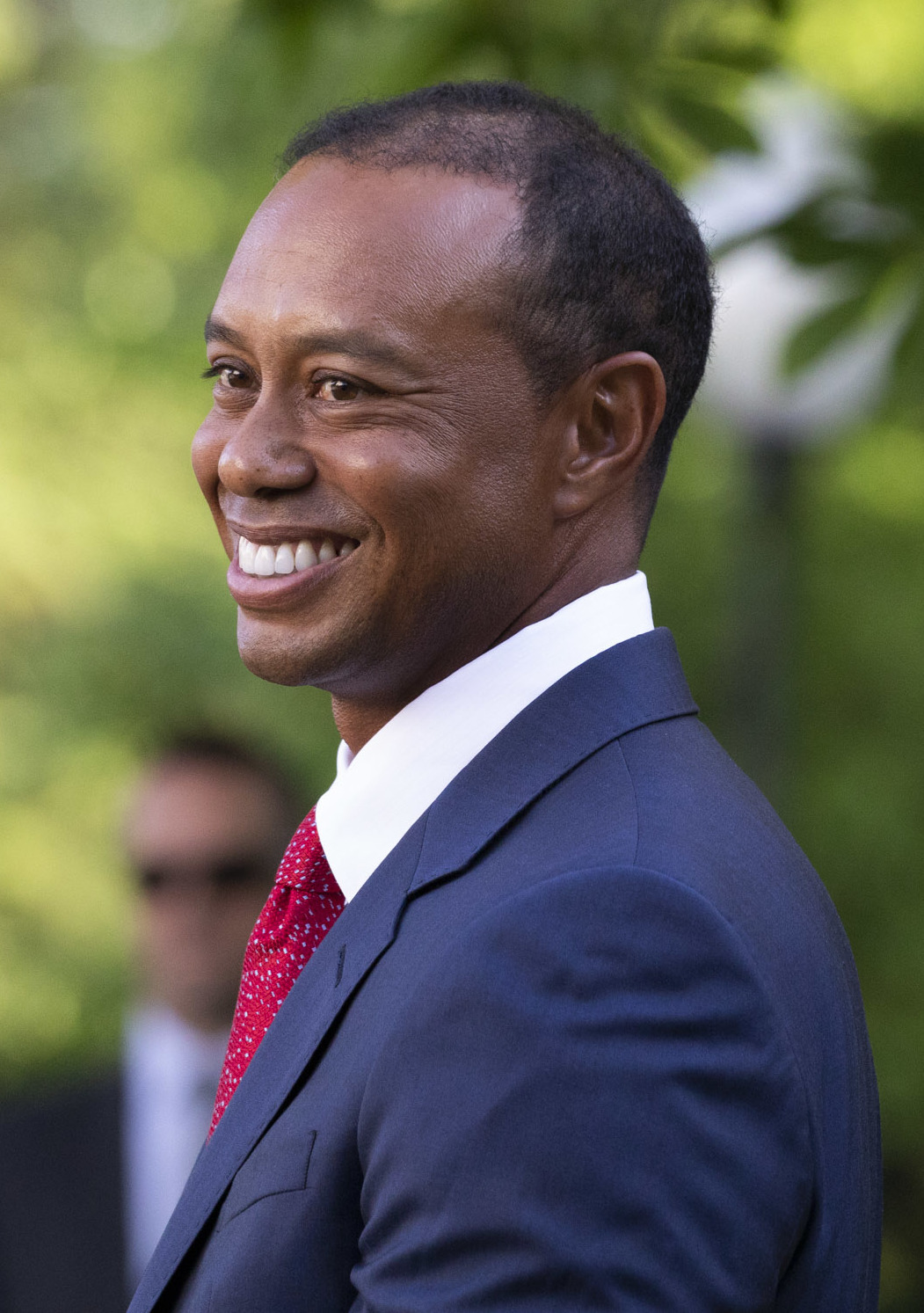
Tiger Woods won his fifth Masters title

External videos
- Full final round coverage on CBS on YouTube

Due to the threat of thunderstorms forecast for the final day, the players were grouped into threesomes with tee times at 7:30 a.m. EDT off the first and tenth tees; the leaders teed off at 9:20 a.m.

Francesco Molinari held the lead throughout the first eleven holes before his tee shot at No. 12 came up well short and rolled back into Rae's Creek, leading to a double bogey and a tie with Tiger Woods at 11 under par. As the final threesome played No. 15, Molinari, Woods, Xander Schauffele, Dustin Johnson and Brooks Koepka were tied at −12, but none of the latter three recorded another birdie and Molinari hit into the water again at the 15th before Woods birdied the hole. Woods doubled his advantage at 16, after his tee shot came within mere inches of going in before stopping three feet away from the cup, and made a tap-in par at 17. Needing only a bogey at the 18th to clinch the tournament, Woods chipped on and two-putted for the 5 and a 2-under-par 70 for the win. It was the first time that Woods had won a major championship when he was trailing after 54 holes.

Woods became the fifth player to have a gap of over a decade between major wins. The others were Henry Cotton, Julius Boros, Hale Irwin and Ben Crenshaw.

==== Timeline of key events ====
12.13pm

Most of the leaders entered Amen corner in or around par for the round. Patrick Cantlay scored 3 under par through the first eleven holes to move up the leaderboard. Some commentators were suggesting Francesco Molinari was showing the same composure that enabled him to win the 2018 Open Championship.

Leaderboard: −13: Molinari (10); −11: Koepka (10), Woods (10); −10: Cantlay (12), Schauffele (12), Poulter (10), Finau (10)

12.31pm:

Brooks Koepka and Ian Poulter both find Rae's Creek on the 12th to score double bogeys. After a birdie on the 15th, backing up birdies on the 2nd, 7th, 8th, and 13th, Jason Day reaches 10 under par.

12.39pm:

Bubba Watson makes an eagle on the 15th, to back up birdies on the 13th and 14th and charge up the leaderboard.

12.47pm:

The leading group tee up on the par 3 12th, with the wind swirling. Francesco Molinari targets the flag and lands on the false front to roll back into Rae's Creek. Tiger Woods hits the centre of the green, after deciding not to go for the flag. Tony Finau goes for the flag, finding Rae's Creek as well. Molinari and Finau, like Koepka and Poulter before them, end up with a double bogey on the 12th, severely hurting their chances of victory.

Leaderboard: −11: Schauffele (13), Molinari (12), Woods (12); −10: Day (16), Watson (16), Cantlay (14)

1.00pm:

Brooks Koepka bounces back from his double bogey on 12, to eagle the 13th. Jon Rahm birdies the 16th to go four under for the round, and 10 under overall. Xander Schuffele birdies the 14th, and Patrick Cantlay eagles the 15th to move into joint lead.

Leaderboard: −12: Cantlay (15), Schauffele (14); −11: Koepka (13), Molinari (12), Woods (12); −10: Day (17), Rahm (16)

1.03pm:

Viktor Hovland of Norway wins the Silver Cup for low amateur. Hovland shot 71 to end the week at −3, one shot ahead of Mexican Alvaro Ortiz.

1.07pm:

Tiger Woods and Francesco Molinari birdie the 13th to move into a share of the lead, whilst Patrick Cantlay bogeys the 16th to move out of the leading pack.

Leaderboard: −12: Schauffele (14), Molinari (13), Woods (13); −11: Cantlay (16), Koepka (13)

1.18pm:

Jason Day birdies the last to finish with a 67, −11 overall, to set the clubhouse lead

1.33pm:

Dustin Johnson birdies the 17th, to back up birdies on the 13th, 15th and 16th and join the leaders at 12 under par. Rickie Fowler also birdies the 17th, to back up birdies on the 13th, 14th and 15th and sit one shot behind.

Leaderboard: −12: D Johnson (17), Schauffele (16), Koepka (15), Molinari (14), Woods (14); −11: Day (F), Fowler (17)

1.46pm:

Francesco Molinari drives into the trees on the 15th, and follows up with a misplaced lay-up. Playing from a tricky angle he hits an overhanging branch and his ball lands the pond guarding the front of the green. He ends up with a double bogey. Tiger Woods makes birdie to take sole lead of the tournament.

Leaderboard: −13: Woods (15); −12: D Johnson (F), Schauffele (16), Koepka (16)

2.22pm:

After a birdie on the 16th, and a par on the 17th, Tiger Woods heads to the 18th knowing a bogey is all he needs to win his 5th Masters.

Leaderboard: −14: Woods (17); −12: D Johnson (F), Schauffele (F), Koepka (F)

2.29pm:

Tiger Woods bogeys the 18th, to win the Masters by one shot.

==== Final leaderboard ====
Champion
Silver Cup winner (low amateur)
(a) = amateur
(c) = past champion

Top 10
Place	Player	Score	To par	Money (US$)
1	(United States) Tiger Woods (c)	70-68-67-70=275	−13	2,070,000
T2	(United States) Dustin Johnson	68-70-70-68=276	−12	858,667
T2	(United States) Brooks Koepka	66-71-69-70=276	−12	858,667
T2	(United States) Xander Schauffele	73-65-70-68=276	−12	858,667
T5	(Australia) Jason Day	70-67-73-67=277	−11	403,938
T5	(United States) Tony Finau	71-70-64-72=277	−11	403,938
T5	(Italy) Francesco Molinari	70-67-66-74=277	−11	403,938
T5	(United States) Webb Simpson	72-71-64-70=277	−11	403,938
T9	(United States) Patrick Cantlay	73-73-64-68=278	−10	310,500
T9	(United States) Rickie Fowler	70-71-68-69=278	−10	310,500
T9	(Spain) Jon Rahm	69-70-71-68=278	−10	310,500

Leaderboard below the top 10
Place	Player	Score	To par	Money ($)
T12	(South Africa) Justin Harding	69-69-70-72=280	−8	225,400
T12	(United States) Matt Kuchar	71-69-68-72=280	−8	225,400
T12	(England) Ian Poulter	68-71-68-73=280	−8	225,400
T12	(United States) Justin Thomas	73-68-69-70=280	−8	225,400
T12	(United States) Bubba Watson (c)	72-72-67-69=280	−8	225,400
17	(United States) Aaron Wise	75-71-68-67=281	−7	184,000
T18	(United States) Patton Kizzire	70-70-73-69=282	−6	161,000
T18	(United States) Phil Mickelson (c)	67-73-70-72=282	−6	161,000
T18	(Australia) Adam Scott (c)	69-68-72-73=282	−6	161,000
T21	(Denmark) Lucas Bjerregaard	70-72-69-72=283	−5	107,956
T21	(England) Matt Fitzpatrick	78-67-68-70=283	−5	107,956
T21	(South Korea) Kim Si-woo	72-72-70-69=283	−5	107,956
T21	(United States) Kevin Kisner	69-73-72-69=283	−5	107,956
T21	(Northern Ireland) Rory McIlroy	73-71-71-68=283	−5	107,956
T21	(Denmark) Thorbjørn Olesen	71-71-68-73=283	−5	107,956
T21	(United States) Jordan Spieth (c)	75-68-69-71=283	−5	107,956
T21	(United States) Kyle Stanley	72-72-70-69=283	−5	107,956
T29	(United States) Bryson DeChambeau	66-75-73-70=284	−4	78,200
T29	(United States) Charley Hoffman	71-71-72-70=284	−4	78,200
T29	(South Africa) Louis Oosthuizen	71-66-71-76=284	−4	78,200
T32	(Norway) Viktor Hovland (a)	72-71-71-71=285	−3	0
T32	(United States) Charles Howell III	73-67-76-69=285	−3	68,042
T32	(Japan) Hideki Matsuyama	75-70-68-72=285	−3	68,042
T32	(United States) Gary Woodland	70-71-74-70=285	−3	68,042
T36	(Spain) Rafa Cabrera-Bello	73-70-75-68=286	−2	55,488
T36	(England) Tommy Fleetwood	71-71-70-74=286	−2	55,488
T36	(Mexico) Álvaro Ortiz (a)	73-71-73-69=286	−2	0
T36	(United States) Patrick Reed (c)	73-70-74-69=286	−2	55,488
T36	(Sweden) Henrik Stenson	74-72-67-73=286	−2	55,488
T36	(United States) Kevin Tway	72-71-70-73=286	−2	55,488
T36	(United States) Jimmy Walker	72-72-72-70=286	−2	55,488
T43	(United States) Keegan Bradley	76-68-71-72=287	−1	44,850
T43	(China) Li Haotong	72-74-73-68=287	−1	44,850
T43	(United States) Keith Mitchell	72-74-72-69=287	−1	44,850
T46	(Canada) Corey Conners	70-71-71-76=288	E	37,950
T46	(United States) Andrew Landry	72-73-73-70=288	E	37,950
T46	(United States) Kevin Na	71-73-73-71=288	E	37,950
T49	(Thailand) Kiradech Aphibarnrat	69-72-75-73=289	+1	32,430
T49	(Australia) Marc Leishman	72-72-70-75=289	+1	32,430
T51	(South Africa) Trevor Immelman (c)	74-72-75-69=290	+2	28,693
T51	(Germany) Martin Kaymer	73-74-72-71=290	+2	28,693
T51	(England) Eddie Pepperell	74-73-72-71=290	+2	28,693
T51	(Australia) Cameron Smith	70-74-69-77=290	+2	28,693
55	(United States) Devon Bling (a)	74-73-71-73=291	+3	0
T56	(England) Tyrrell Hatton	73-73-72-74=292	+4	26,910
T56	(United States) Billy Horschel	72-75-74-71=292	+4	26,910
T58	(South Africa) Branden Grace	72-75-72-74=293	+5	26,335
T58	(United States) Zach Johnson (c)	74-73-73-73=293	+5	26,335
T58	(Japan) Takumi Kanaya (a)	73-74-68-78=293	+5	0
61	(Japan) Satoshi Kodaira	75-70-73-76=294	+6	25,990
T62	(Argentina) Emiliano Grillo	72-75-73-76=296	+8	25,415
T62	(United States) J. B. Holmes	70-72-74-80=296	+8	25,415
T62	(Germany) Bernhard Langer (c)	71-72-75-78=296	+8	25,415
T62	(Sweden) Alex Norén	75-72-75-74=296	+8	25,415
CUT	(United States) Stewart Cink	76-72=148	+4	
CUT	(Spain) Sergio García (c)	73-75=148	+4	
CUT	(Scotland) Sandy Lyle (c)	73-75=148	+4	
CUT	(United States) Kevin O'Connell (a)	77-71=148	+4	
CUT	(England) Justin Rose	75-73=148	+4	
CUT	(Canada) Mike Weir (c)	72-76=148	+4	
CUT	(England) Danny Willett (c)	75-73=148	+4	
CUT	(United States) Fred Couples (c)	78-71=149	+5	
CUT	(United States) Adam Long	75-74=149	+5	
CUT	(South Africa) Charl Schwartzel (c)	77-72=149	+5	
CUT	(United States) Brandt Snedeker	75-74=149	+5	
CUT	(Japan) Shugo Imahira	76-74=150	+6	
CUT	(Republic of Ireland) Shane Lowry	78-73=151	+7	
CUT	(United States) Larry Mize (c)	77-74=151	+7	
CUT	(South Africa) Jovan Rebula (a)	73-79=152	+8	
CUT	(England) Matt Wallace	75-77=152	+8	
CUT	(England) Paul Casey	81-73=154	+10	
CUT	(United States) Michael Kim	76-78=154	+10	
CUT	(Fiji) Vijay Singh (c)	80-76=156	+12	
CUT	(Wales) Ian Woosnam (c)	80-76=156	+12	
CUT	(Argentina) Ángel Cabrera (c)	82-75=157	+13	
CUT	(Spain) José María Olazábal (c)	78-79=157	+13	

==== Hole by hole scorecard progression ====
Hole	1	2	3	4	5	6	7	8	9	10	11	12	13	14	15	16	17	18
Par	4	5	4	3	4	3	4	5	4	4	4	3	5	4	5	3	4	4
(United States) Woods	−11	−11	−12	−11	−10	−10	−11	−12	−12	−11	−11	−11	−12	−12	−13	−14	−14	−13
(United States) D. Johnson	−8	−8	−7	−7	−7	−7	−7	−8	−8	−8	−8	−8	−9	−9	−10	−11	−12	−12
(United States) Koepka	−10	−11	−11	−11	−11	−10	−10	−11	−11	−11	−11	−9	−11	−11	−12	−12	−12	−12
(United States) Schauffele	−9	−10	−9	−9	−8	−8	−7	−8	−9	−9	−10	−10	−11	−12	−12	−12	−12	−12
(Australia) Day	−6	−7	−7	−6	−6	−6	−7	−8	−8	−8	−8	−8	−9	−9	−10	−10	−10	−11
(United States) Finau	−11	−11	−11	−11	−10	−10	−10	−11	−11	−10	−10	−8	−9	−9	−10	−11	−11	−11
(Italy) Molinari	−13	−13	−13	−13	−13	−13	−12	−13	−13	−13	−13	−11	−12	−12	−10	−10	−11	−11
(United States) Simpson	−9	−9	−9	−9	−9	−8	−8	−8	−8	−8	−8	−8	−9	−10	−10	−10	−10	−11
(United States) Cantlay	−7	−8	−8	−7	−8	−8	−9	−9	−9	−9	−10	−10	−10	−10	−12	−11	−10	−10
(United States) Fowler	−8	−8	−8	−8	−8	−8	−7	−8	−8	−8	−8	−7	−8	−9	−10	−10	−11	−10
(Spain) Rahm	−6	−7	−6	−6	−6	−5	−6	−8	−8	−8	−8	−8	−9	−9	−9	−10	−10	−10
(South Africa) Harding	−9	−8	−8	−7	−7	−8	−7	−7	−7	−6	−6	−7	−8	−8	−7	−7	−7	−8
(United States) Kuchar	−8	−9	−9	−8	−8	−7	−7	−8	−8	−9	−9	−8	−8	−8	−8	−8	−8	−8
(England) Poulter	−9	−8	−8	−8	−8	−9	−10	−10	−10	−10	−9	−7	−8	−8	−9	−9	−8	−8
(United States) Thomas	−6	−7	−7	−7	−7	−7	−7	−7	−7	−7	−7	−8	−9	−8	−7	−9	−9	−8
(United States) Watson	−5	−5	−5	−5	−5	−5	−5	−5	−6	−6	−6	−6	−7	−8	−10	−10	−9	−8

Cumulative tournament scores, relative to par

Eagle	Birdie	Bogey	Double bogey

== Quotes ==
- "Waited for years, many doubted we'd ever see it, but here it is...the return to glory!" - Jim Nantz's (CBS Sports) call as Tiger Woods sunk his final putt on the 18th hole to win his first Masters in 14 years and his first major in nearly 11 years

== Reaction from Woods ==
As is traditional, Woods was interviewed in Butler Cabin, where he discussed his victory:

I'm a little hoarse from yelling. I was just trying to plot my way round. Then all of a sudden I had the lead. When I tapped the putt in, I don't know what I did. I know I screamed. And to have my kids there ... it's come full circle. In 1997 my dad was here. Now I'm the dad.

It's overwhelming, because of what has transpired. Last year I was just very lucky to be playing again. I missed a couple of years of playing this great tournament. And to now be the champion ... what, is it 22 years? It's a long time! It's unreal. My mom was here, she was here in 97 as well. I'm kind of at a loss for words. This is up there. It's one of the hardest I've ever had to win. I was close last year in the majors. I learned from those, and was able to seal the deal today.
