= Jovan Rebula =

South African professional golfer

Personal information
- Nationality: South Africa
- Born: 22 July 1997 (age 29) Western Cape, South Africa

Career
- Sport: Golf
- College: Auburn University
- Turned professional: 2021
- Current tours: Sunshine Tour; Challenge Tour

Best results in major championships
- Masters Tournament: CUT: 2019
- PGA Championship: DNP
- U.S. Open: CUT: 2019
- The Open Championship: CUT: 2018

Jovan Rebula (born 22 July 1997) is a South African professional golfer. In 2018, he became the second South African golfer in history to win The Amateur Championship. This win gave him exemptions to the 2018 Open Championship, 2019 Masters Tournament and 2019 U.S. Open. In team events, Rebula was the captain of the South African team that competed at the 2016 Eisenhower Trophy. At the following edition, Rebula played in the first round of the 2018 Eisenhower Trophy as captain before leaving the event due to a back injury.

== Early life and education ==
On 22 July 1997, Rebula was born in Western Cape, South Africa. During his childhood, Rebula started playing golf at the age of eight while also competing in cricket and rugby. While attending Auburn University for his post-secondary college, Rebula joined the Auburn Tigers men's golf team in 2016. With Auburn at individual events, Rebula finished in the top-10 at seven golf tournaments in the 2016–17 and 2017–18 seasons. He additionally reached the top-10 at five tournaments each during the 2018–19 and 2019–20 seasons.

In 2020, Rebula opted to remain for an extra year at Auburn instead of becoming a professional golfer. Rebula made his choice while he had stopped playing golf for a month during the COVID-19 pandemic. Rebula remained at Auburn until May 2021. During this season, Rebula had a tenth place tie at the 2020 Jerry Pate National Intercollegiate.

Rebula was part of the Auburn golf team that won the SEC championship in 2018. During the 2017 NCAA Division I Men's Golf Championship, Rebula was tied for 23rd individually while finishing 11th in the team event with Auburn.

== Career ==
=== Amateur career ===
As an amateur golfer, Rebula has won multiple events in South Africa throughout the 2010s. As part of the South Africa Golf Association, his wins include the 2012 South African U15 Championship and the 2013 South African Boys U17 Stroke Play. In following years, Rebula won the Proudfoot Trophy in 2014 and was second at the 2015 South African Amateur. In 2018, Rebula became the second South African golfer in history to win The Amateur Championship.

At American events, Rebula beat U.S. Amateur champion Viktor Hovland to win the 2019 Georgia Cup. For his U.S. Amateur appearances, Rebula missed the cut in 2019 and 2020. During these years, Rebula also missed the cut during the Western Amateur in 2020. In team events, Rebula was the captain of the South African team that played at the 2016 Eisenhower Trophy. He returned as captain for South Africa at the 2018 Eisenhower Trophy but left the event after the first round due to a back injury.

=== Professional events ===
Rebula played on the European Tour at the 2017 BMW SA Open. His best performance at the European Tour was at the 2018 South African Open where he tied for 24th place. Rebula's win at the Amateur Championship gave him an exemption for the 2018 Open Championship, 2019 Masters Tournament and 2019 U.S Open. At these major championships, Rebula missed the cut in all three events.

Rebula qualified to become a Forme Tour player in June 2021 and turned professional. During the Forme Tour, Rebula was tied for 63rd at the 2021 Auburn University Club Invitational. On the Sunshine Tour, Reubla was 10th at the 2021 South African Open and missed the cut at the Vodacom Origins of Golf Final in 2022.

== Personal life ==
Rebula is the nephew of golfer Ernie Els. On his father's side he is of Serbian background.

== Amateur wins ==
- 2012 South African Under 15 Stroke Play
- 2013 North & South SA Junior, South African U17 Stroke Play
- 2014 Nomads National Order of Merit - Coastal 1, Curro South African Juniors International, All Africa Junior Team Championship (individual)
- 2016 Eastern Province Border Championship, Western Province Strokeplay & Amateur
- 2018 The Amateur Championship
- 2019 SEC Championship, Kiawah Classic at Turtle Point

== Results in major championships ==
Results not in chronological order before 2019.

Tournament	2018	2019
Masters Tournament		CUT
PGA Championship		
U.S. Open		CUT
The Open Championship	CUT	

Did not play

CUT = missed the half-way cut

== Team appearances ==
- Eisenhower Trophy (representing South Africa): 2016, 2018
- Arnold Palmer Cup (representing the International team): 2018
