= Webb Simpson =

American professional golfer (born 1985)

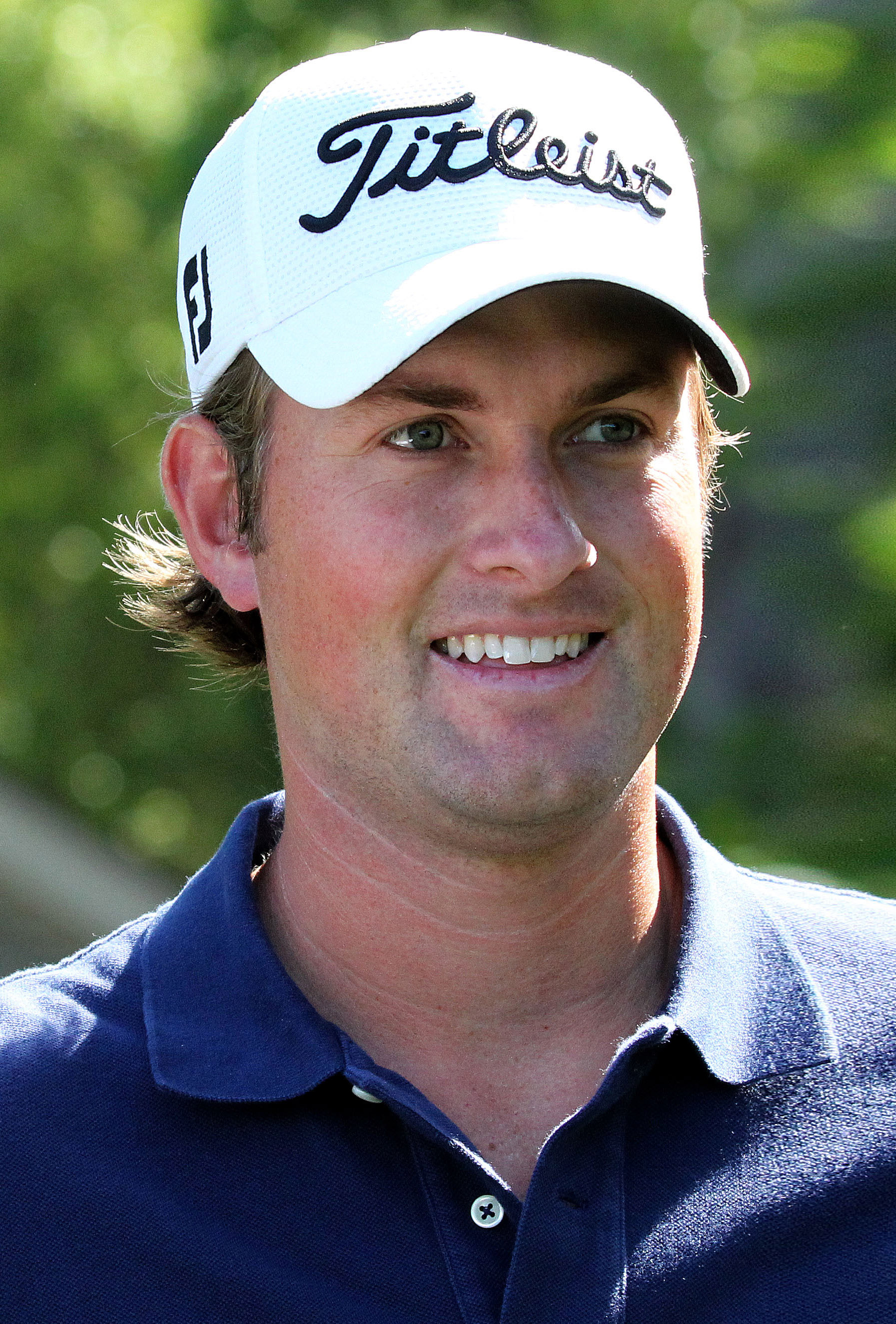
- Simpson at the 2012 RBC Heritage

Personal information
- Full name: James Frederick Webb Simpson
- Nationality: United States
- Born: August 8, 1985 (age 41) Raleigh, North Carolina, U.S.
- Height: 6 ft 2 in (1.88 m)
- Weight: 175 lb (79 kg; 12.5 st)
- Spouse: Taylor Dowd Keith (m. 2010)
- Children: 5

Career
- Sport: Golf
- College: Wake Forest University
- Turned professional: 2008
- Current tour: PGA Tour
- Former tour: Nationwide Tour
- Professional wins: 7
- Highest ranking: 4 (July 5, 2020) (as of November 15, 2026)

Number of wins by tour
- PGA Tour: 7
- European Tour: 1

Best results in major championships (wins: 1)
- Masters Tournament: T5: 2019
- PGA Championship: T13: 2016
- U.S. Open: Won: 2012
- The Open Championship: T12: 2018

Achievements and awards
- Byron Nelson Award: 2019–20
- Vardon Trophy: 2020

James Frederick Webb Simpson (born August 8, 1985) is an American professional golfer on the PGA Tour who won the 2012 U.S. Open and the 2018 Players Championship.

As an amateur, he was a member of the United States' victorious 2007 Walker Cup and 2007 Palmer Cup teams. In college, Simpson played on the Wake Forest University golf team on the Arnold Palmer scholarship.

After turning professional, Simpson played on the Nationwide Tour where he finished in second place twice. Simpson qualified for the PGA Tour after his tie for seventh at the 2008 PGA Tour Qualifying School. In 2011, Simpson had his first two victories on the PGA Tour, which came at the Wyndham Championship and at the Deutsche Bank Championship, a FedEx Cup playoff event. These wins helped him finish in second on the Tour's money list. He was also a member of the United States' victorious 2011 Presidents Cup, 2013 Presidents Cup and 2019 Presidents Cup teams.

== Amateur career ==
Simpson played high school golf at Needham B. Broughton High School in Raleigh, where he won the 2004 NCHSAA 4A state championship.

He played collegiate golf at Wake Forest University on an Arnold Palmer Scholarship. He was a three-time All-American and the ACC Player of the Year in 2008. He played on the winning 2007 Walker Cup team and the 2007 Palmer Cup team.

== Professional career ==
=== Early years ===
After turning professional in June 2008, Simpson played on the PGA Tour and Nationwide Tour on sponsor's exemptions. He recorded two runner-up finishes on the Nationwide Tour, including a loss in a playoff at the Chattanooga Classic. He then competed in the PGA Tour's qualifying school and finished T7 to earn his Tour card for 2009. He had a successful start to his rookie year with two successive top-10s, finished tied 9th at the Sony Open in Hawaii and tied 5th-place finish at the Bob Hope Classic. Simpson then went on a run of poor results, missing nine of his next thirteen cuts, before steadying his season that summer with some solid displays to qualify for the FedEx Cup playoffs. There he finished 8th at The Barclays to ensure further progression to the second and third playoff events before being eliminated in 62nd position. He ended the season with four top-10 finishes and retained his tour card ranked 70th on the money list.

Simpson's 2010 season was less successful, with only two top-ten finishes all season, both of these occurring towards the latter end of the season. His season took a similar pattern to his first on tour when he missed six straight cuts in the middle of season, before a strong summer saw him make six of next eight cuts to again qualify for the season ending playoffs. This time, however Simpson missed the cut at the second playoff event and was eliminated. He finished the year 94th on the money list to keep his playing privileges for the 2011 season.

=== 2011 ===
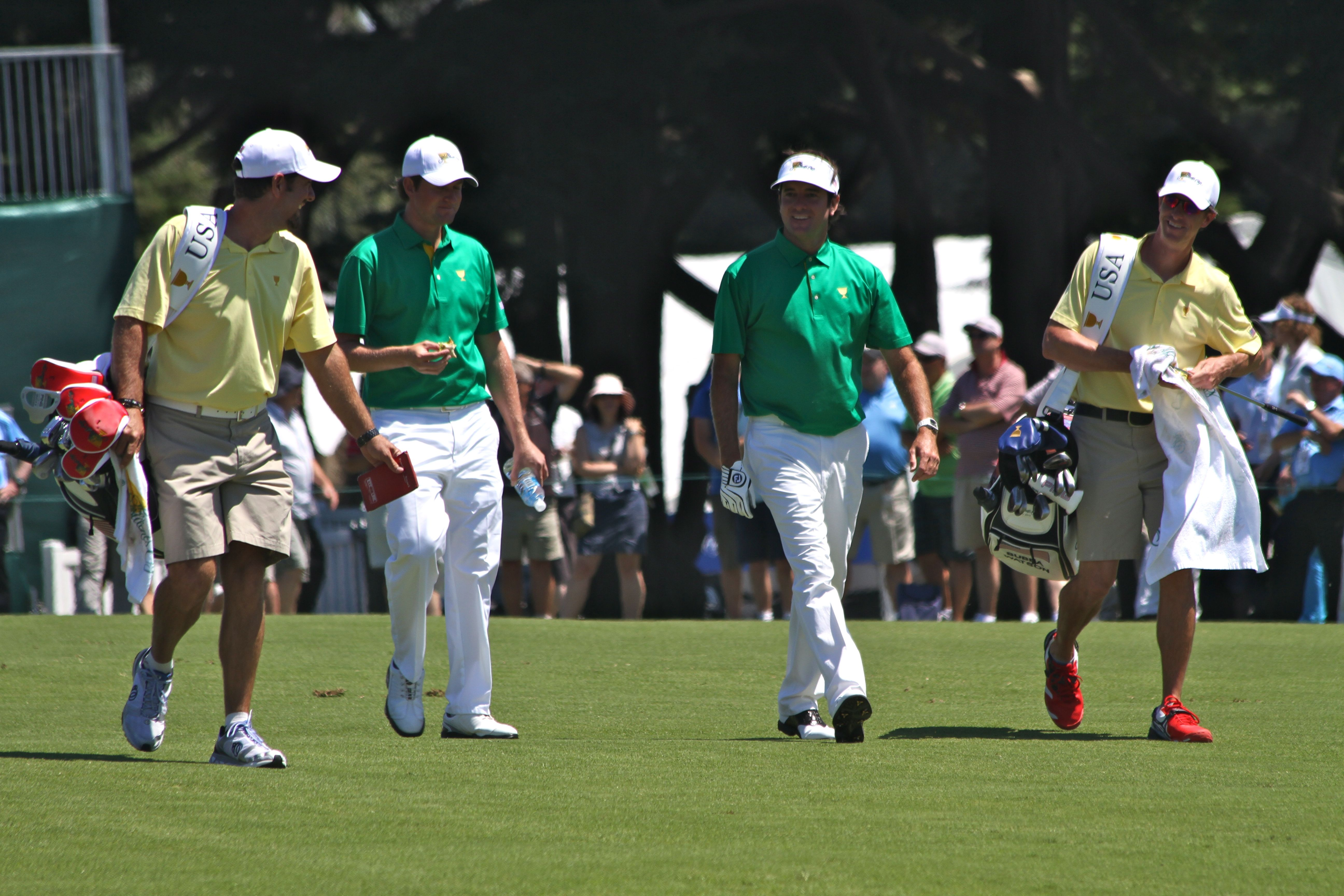
Simpson (second from left) and Bubba Watson (third from left) at the 2011 Presidents Cup

After starting the season well with three top-25 finishes in his opening five events on tour, Simpson had a chance to win his first PGA Tour title at the 2011 Transitions Championship but bogeyed the final hole, missing out by one stroke to Gary Woodland. Simpson then came even closer to his first career PGA Tour title when he lost out in a playoff to Bubba Watson at the Zurich Classic of New Orleans. At the 15th hole Simpson had incurred a one stroke penalty when his ball moved fractionally while he was addressing the ball. This meant that Watson could tie with Simpson to take the tournament into a playoff. The two players were tied at 15-under-par after the full 72 holes. Both players made a birdie on the first extra hole, the 18th, with Watson holing a 12 footer to take the playoff to a second hole. When they replayed the 18th hole for a third time in succession, Simpson missed exactly the same putt for birdie which Watson had holed earlier during the first playoff hole, allowing Watson to tap in for the victory. In June, Simpson played in his first major championship at the U.S. Open and recorded a tied 14th finish. He followed it up with another top-20 showing at The Open Championship a month later.

Simpson won his first PGA Tour title at the Wyndham Championship in Greensboro, North Carolina, his home state, on August 21, 2011. Simpson won the championship by three strokes over George McNeill, carding a final round of 67, which included three birdies and no bogeys. After achieving his first victory so close to home, Simpson said "I really couldn't think of a better place to win than here in Greensboro. That was probably the most fun 18 holes I've ever been a part of." As a result of this victory, one week before the season ending FedEx Cup playoffs, Simpson jumped to third in the overall standings. In September, Simpson won his second tournament of the 2011 PGA Tour season and of his career, at the second FedEx Cup playoff event, the Deutsche Bank Championship. He beat Chez Reavie in a sudden death playoff. Simpson made a 10-foot birdie putt on the 18th to cut Reavie's lead to one and when Reavie bogeyed the 18th, they went into a playoff replaying the 18th hole. Simpson made another 12-foot birdie putt to stay alive while Reavie made birdie. On the 17th hole Simpson hit his second shot on the par-4 to 8 feet and Reavie replied by hitting his to within 20 feet. Reavie shaved the edge with his attempt, allowing Simpson to capitalize by knocking his 8 footer in for the victory. Simpson moved to first in the FedEx Cup standings for the first time in his career.

Simpson was also in contention at the third FedEx Cup playoff event, the BMW Championship, before scores of 73–71 on the weekend led to a fifth-placed finish. He maintained his lead of the FedEx Cup standings going into the final playoff event at the Tour Championship. Bill Haas won the Tour Championship to finish top of the standings by 15 points, with Simpson in second place after finishing 22nd in the field of 30 players.

Simpson came close to picking up his third victory of the year at the McGladrey Classic in October but lost to Ben Crane in a playoff. Simpson missed a three footer for par on the second extra hole to lose out to Crane. The runner-up finish made him number one on the money list, overtaking Luke Donald with one week remaining. Donald however won the final event of the season at the Children's Miracle Network Hospitals Classic to beat Simpson to the money title meaning he finished second on the 2011 PGA Tour money list. He finished the year with a record of 23 cuts made in 26 starts and well over $6 million in prize money. In November, Simpson represented the United States at the 2011 Presidents Cup in Australia, for the first time in his career. He posted a 3–2 record, helping the United States defeat the International team, 19–15.

=== 2012 ===
Simpson opened the 2012 season at the Hyundai Tournament of Champions where he finished tied for third place, four shots off the winning total of Steve Stricker. He then recorded top-10s at both the Waste Management Phoenix Open and the Transitions Championship to maintain his solid start to the year. Then at the Wells Fargo Championship Simpson finished fourth after holding the 54-hole lead. He made a late bogey in his final round on Sunday to finish a shot outside of a playoff. On May 14, he missed the cut at The Players Championship to end a run of 18 consecutive cuts made in PGA Tour events. This was also the first time he had missed the cut in the 2012 season, after 11 straight cuts made. He then proceeded to miss the cut in his next event at the Memorial Tournament.

==== 2012 U.S. Open win ====
On June 17, Simpson won the U.S. Open at the Olympic Club in San Francisco. He shot a two-under 68 in the final round for a final score of one-over par. It was good enough to win by one stroke over Graeme McDowell and Michael Thompson. McDowell missed a 25-foot birdie putt on the 18th hole that would have forced a playoff. It was Simpson's first major championship win. The win moved Simpson to a career-high fifth in the Official World Golf Ranking.

==== Rest of 2012 ====
Following his victory at the U.S. Open, Simpson announced his intention to skip The Open Championship the following month, as his wife was due to give birth to their second child. He finished in a tie for 29th at the Travelers Championship the week after winning the U.S. Open. In July, Simpson held a two stroke lead going into the final round of the Greenbrier Classic. He had only one bogey all tournament before bogeying four of five holes on the back nine, finishing in a tie for seventh place. Having withdrawn from The Open Championship, Simpson did not compete until at the final major of the year, the PGA Championship. He started the first round at six-over-par through seven holes on his way to an opening round of 79. Despite shooting an even-par round in difficult conditions, he missed the cut by one stroke. On August 13, Simpson was confirmed as one of the automatic qualifiers for the 2012 Ryder Cup team, finishing in 5th place in the final standings. It would be Simpson's first appearance in the team event.

=== 2013 ===
In April, Simpson lost a playoff in the RBC Heritage to Graeme McDowell. In the season's final event, Simpson shot a 63 in the final round of the Tour Championship to finish in fourth place. Simpson had five top-tens and finished 20th on the PGA Tour's money list. Following the season, Simpson was a member of the winning American team in the Presidents Cup played at Murfield Village in Ohio.

=== 2014 ===
Simpson won the Shriners Hospitals for Children Open in Las Vegas, the second event in the tour's new wrap-around season in October 2013, by six strokes. It was Simpson's first victory since his U.S. Open win and fourth PGA Tour win of his career. For the season Simpson had a total of nine top-tens and finished 17th on the PGA Tour's money list. Simpson was selected by Tom Watson as one of his three captain's picks for the 2014 Ryder Cup team, finishing with a record of 0–1–1 in the two matches he participated in. This included a halved match against Ian Poulter in the singles competition.

=== 2015 ===
Simpson was winless for the season though he did have five top-ten finishes. Simpson's highest finish was a tie for second at the Wells Fargo Championship which was won by seven strokes in a record-setting performance by Rory McIlroy. For the season Simpson finished 43rd on the PGA Tour's money list. For the first time in five years, Simpson did not represent the United States in a year-end international competition.

=== 2018 ===
Simpson won the 2018 Players Championship at 18 under par. He began the final round with the largest Sunday lead ever at this event and, even though he double-bogeyed the final hole, his round of 73 was good enough for the win. This was his first win in four years. Simpson won for the fifth time in his career and moved to No. 20 in the world rankings and took home $1.98 million, the second-largest tournament payoff, behind only the U.S. Open.

In September 2018, Simpson qualified for the U.S. team participating in the 2018 Ryder Cup. Europe defeated the U.S. team 17 1/2 to 10 1/2. Simpson went 2–1–0. He won his singles match against Justin Rose.

=== 2019 ===
In December 2019, Simpson played on the U.S. team at the 2019 Presidents Cup at Royal Melbourne Golf Club in Australia. The U.S. team won 16–14. Simpson went 1–3–0 and won his Sunday singles match against An Byeong-hun.

=== 2020 ===
In February, Simpson won the Waste Management Phoenix Open in a playoff over Tony Finau, a result that lifted him back into the world top 10 for the first time since 2012. In June, Simpson won the RBC Heritage at Harbour Town Golf Links in Hilton Head, South Carolina by one stroke over Abraham Ancer.

== Junior tournament ==
Simpson founded an annual junior golf tournament with friend and current director Mark Bentley in 2010. The tournament is currently called the Webb Simpson Challenge.

== Personal life ==
Simpson was born on August 8, 1985, in Raleigh, North Carolina, to Evander Samuel "Sam" Simpson III and Debbie Webb Simpson, the fifth of six children. Simpson is a Christian. After his first PGA tour win, he thanked his "...Lord and Savior, Jesus Christ". Simpson frequently posts Bible verses and other statements about his faith on his Twitter account.

== Amateur wins ==
- 2001 Rolex Tournament of Champions
- 2004 Azalea Invitational
- 2005 Southern Amateur
- 2006 Sunnehanna Amateur
- 2007 Dogwood Invitational, Southern Amateur, Azalea Invitational

== Professional wins (7) ==
=== PGA Tour wins (7) ===
Legend
Major championships (1)
Players Championships (1)
FedEx Cup playoff events (1)
Other PGA Tour (4)

No.	Date	Tournament	Winning score	To par	Margin of victory	Runner(s)-up
1	Aug 21, 2011	Wyndham Championship	66-65-64-67=262	−18	3 strokes	(United States) George McNeill
2	Sep 5, 2011	Deutsche Bank Championship	69-68-67-65=269	−15	Playoff	(United States) Chez Reavie
3	Jun 17, 2012	U.S. Open	72-73-68-68=281	+1	1 stroke	(Northern Ireland) Graeme McDowell, (United States) Michael Thompson
4	Oct 20, 2013	Shriners Hospitals for Children Open	64-63-67-66=260	−24	6 strokes	(United States) Jason Bohn, (Japan) Ryo Ishikawa
5	May 13, 2018	The Players Championship	66-63-68-73=270	−18	4 strokes	(United States) Xander Schauffele, (South Africa) Charl Schwartzel, (United States) Jimmy Walker
6	Feb 2, 2020	Waste Management Phoenix Open	71-63-64-69=267	−17	Playoff	(United States) Tony Finau
7	Jun 21, 2020	RBC Heritage	65-65-68-64=262	−22	1 stroke	(Mexico) Abraham Ancer

PGA Tour playoff record (2–5)

No.	Year	Tournament	Opponent	Result
1	2011	Zurich Classic of New Orleans	(United States) Bubba Watson	Lost to birdie on second extra hole
2	2011	Deutsche Bank Championship	(United States) Chez Reavie	Won with birdie on second extra hole
3	2011	McGladrey Classic	(United States) Ben Crane	Lost to par on second extra hole
4	2013	RBC Heritage	(Northern Ireland) Graeme McDowell	Lost to par on first extra hole
5	2017	Waste Management Phoenix Open	(Japan) Hideki Matsuyama	Lost to birdie on fourth extra hole
6	2019	RSM Classic	(United States) Tyler Duncan	Lost to birdie on second extra hole
7	2020	Waste Management Phoenix Open	(United States) Tony Finau	Won with birdie on first extra hole

== Playoff record ==
Nationwide Tour playoff record (0–1)

No.	Year	Tournament	Opponent	Result
1	2008	Chattanooga Classic	(India) Arjun Atwal	Lost to birdie on first extra hole

== Major championships ==
=== Wins (1) ===
Year	Championship	54 holes	Winning score	Margin	Runners-up
2012	U.S. Open	4 shot deficit	+1 (72-73-68-68=281)	1 stroke	(Northern Ireland) Graeme McDowell, (United States) Michael Thompson

=== Results timeline ===
Results not in chronological order in 2020.

Tournament	2011	2012	2013	2014	2015	2016	2017	2018
Masters Tournament		T44	CUT	CUT	T28	T29	CUT	T20
U.S. Open	T14	1	T32	T45	T46	CUT	T35	T10
The Open Championship	T16		T64	CUT	T40	T39	T37	T12
PGA Championship	CUT	CUT	T25	CUT	T54	T13	T33	T19

Tournament	2019	2020	2021	2022	2023	2024
Masters Tournament	T5	T10	T12	T35		
PGA Championship	T29	T37	T30	T20	CUT	
U.S. Open	T16	T8	CUT	CUT		CUT
The Open Championship	T30	NT	T19	CUT		

Win
Top 10
Did not play

CUT = missed the half-way cut
"T" = tied
NT = no tournament due to COVID-19 pandemic

=== Summary ===
Tournament	Wins	2nd	3rd	Top-5	Top-10	Top-25	Events	Cuts made
Masters Tournament	0	0	0	1	2	4	11	8
PGA Championship	0	0	0	0	0	4	13	9
U.S. Open	1	0	0	1	3	5	13	9
The Open Championship	0	0	0	0	0	3	10	8
Totals	1	0	0	2	5	16	47	34

- Most consecutive cuts made – 16 (2017 U.S. Open – 2021 PGA)
- Longest streak of top-10s – 2 (2020 U.S. Open – 2020 Masters)

== The Players Championship ==
=== Wins (1) ===
Year	Championship	54 holes	Winning score	Margin	Runners-up
2018	The Players Championship	7 shot lead	−18 (66-63-68-73=270)	4 strokes	(United States) Xander Schauffele, (South Africa) Charl Schwartzel, (United States) Jimmy Walker

=== Results timeline ===
Tournament	2009	2010	2011	2012	2013	2014	2015	2016	2017	2018	2019
The Players Championship	CUT	CUT	T69	CUT	T15	CUT	T66		T16	1	T16

Tournament	2020	2021	2022	2023	2024
The Players Championship	C	CUT	CUT	CUT	CUT

Win
Did not play

CUT = missed the halfway cut
"T" indicates a tie for a place
C = Canceled after the first round due to the COVID-19 pandemic

== Results in World Golf Championships ==
Results not in chronological order before 2015.

Tournament	2012	2013	2014	2015	2016	2017	2018	2019	2020	2021	2022
Championship	T35	T20	T47	T7			T37	T39	T61	T6	
Match Play	R64	QF	R16	T17		T58	T29	T56	NT^{1}	T28	T35
Invitational		T14	T31	T25			T24	2	T12	T15	
Champions									NT^{1}	NT^{1}	NT^{1}

^{1}Cancelled due to COVID-19 pandemic

Top 10
Did not play

QF, R16, R32, R64 = Round in which player lost in match play
NT = no tournament
"T" = tied
Note that the Championship and Invitational were discontinued from 2022.

== PGA Tour career summary ==
Season	Starts	Cuts made	Wins (Majors)	Top 10	Top 25	Earnings ($)	Money list rank
2006	1	0	0	0	0	0	–
2008	6	3	0	0	0	38,460	250
2009	30	17	0	4	8	1,249,674	70
2010	31	18	0	2	7	972,962	94
2011	26	23	2	12	21	6,347,353	2
2012	22	18	1 (1)	7	10	3,436,758	17
2013	25	21	0	5	15	2,957,582	20
2014	25	19	1	9	11	3,539,601	17
2015	22	19	0	5	8	2,046,260	43
2016	20	15	0	2	7	1,450,355	73
2017	28	23	0	6	12	3,209,646	23
2018	26	23	1	9	16	5,376,417	9
2019	21	20	0	6	15	4,690,572	10
2020	14	12	2	8	10	5,097,742	5
2021	21	17	0	6	13	2,783,012	40
2022	20	12	0	1	4	1,041,955	120
2023	19	9	0	2	3	908,929	142
2024	16	10	0	0	1	606,011	158
Career*	382	285	7 (1)	84	161	46,085,168	25

*As of the 2024 season.

== U.S. national team appearances ==
Amateur

- Walker Cup: 2007 (winners)
- Palmer Cup: 2007 (winners)

Professional

- Presidents Cup: 2011 (winners), 2013 (winners), 2019 (winners)
- Ryder Cup: 2012, 2014, 2018

== See also ==
- 2008 PGA Tour Qualifying School graduates
- List of men's major championships winning golfers
- List of golfers with most PGA Tour wins
