= Gary Woodland =

American professional golfer (born 1984)

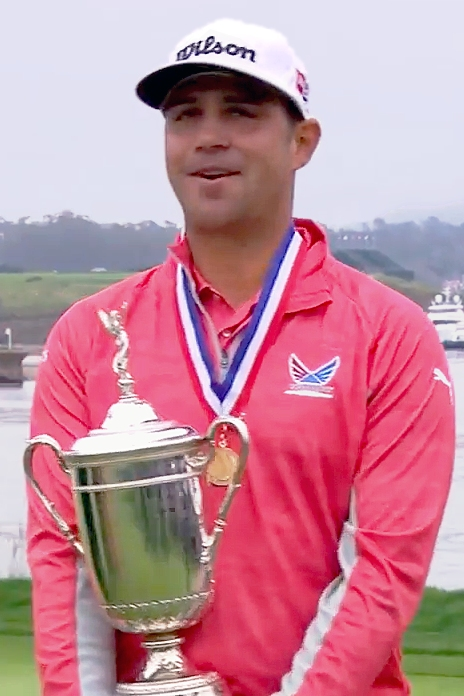
- Woodland with the 2019 U.S. Open trophy

Personal information
- Full name: Gary Lynn Woodland
- Nationality: United States
- Born: May 21, 1984 (age 42) Topeka, Kansas, U.S.
- Height: 6 ft 1 in (1.85 m)
- Weight: 195 lb (88 kg; 13.9 st)
- Spouse: Gabby Granado (m. 2016)
- Children: 3

Career
- Sport: Golf
- College: Washburn University; University of Kansas
- Turned professional: 2007
- Current tour: PGA Tour
- Former tour: Nationwide Tour
- Professional wins: 7
- Highest ranking: 12 (June 16, 2019) (as of October 25, 2026)

Number of wins by tour
- PGA Tour: 5
- European Tour: 1
- Other: 2

Best results in major championships (wins: 1)
- Masters Tournament: T14: 2023
- PGA Championship: T6: 2018
- U.S. Open: Won: 2019
- The Open Championship: T12: 2016

Achievements and awards
- PGA Tour Courage Award: 2024

Gary Lynn Woodland (born May 21, 1984) is an American professional golfer who plays on the PGA Tour. He has won one major championship, the 2019 U.S. Open.

Originally a collegiate basketball player at Washburn University, Woodland transferred to the University of Kansas to play golf and had a successful amateur career. He turned professional in 2007 and won his first tournament on the PGA Tour in 2011. Following medical problems including surgery on a brain tumor, Woodland won his fifth PGA Tour title at the Houston Open in 2026, which was his first professional victory since the 2019 U.S. Open.

== Early life and amateur career ==
Woodland was born in Topeka, Kansas, on May 21, 1984, the son of Dan and Linda Woodland. He attended Shawnee Heights High School in the suburb of Tecumseh, where he was a four-year letterman in both basketball and golf. As a senior, Woodland became the first all-state basketball selection in Shawnee Heights history. He averaged 18 points per game for the season, including 26 points in the state title match.

After high school, Woodland attended Washburn University in Topeka on a basketball scholarship, but left after his freshman year to attend the University of Kansas in Lawrence on a golf scholarship. He was a backup shooting guard during his freshman season and averaged six points per game. Regarding his decision to switch basketball for golf, Woodland recalled in 2019: "Offensively, I was fine. I could get around, I could do stuff, but defensively I wasn't quick enough. I couldn't keep up. That was the biggest thing. And that was at the Division II level. You talk about Division I level. Our first game was at KU and I learned quickly I needed to find something else."

Woodland won four individual collegiate tournaments during his time with the Kansas Jayhawks: the 2005 Cleveland State Invitational, 2006 Kansas Invitational, 2007 All-American Golf Classic and 2007 Louisiana Classic. He also won the 2005 Kansas Amateur Championship. He graduated with a degree in sociology in 2007 and subsequently started his career as a professional golfer.

== Professional career ==
After turning professional, Woodland played in a handful of tournaments on the Nationwide Tour in 2007 and 2008. At the end of the 2008 season, he entered the Qualifying school for the PGA Tour, and finished in a tie for 11th, which was good enough to earn him a full card to play on the PGA Tour in 2009. However, he struggled for form in his debut season, making just eight cuts in 18 appearances before a shoulder injury cut his golfing year short in July.

In 2010, Woodland divided his time between the PGA and Nationwide Tours. He continued to struggle for his best form but did not record a single top ten finish on either tour. He did display enough consistency to finish 92nd in the Nationwide Tour money list. Once again, he entered the season-ending qualifying school, and again he finished T-11, to secure a return to full PGA Tour status.

Woodland's second tournament of 2011 was the Bob Hope Classic, where he and Jhonattan Vegas finished tied for first place at 27-under-par; Vegas edged out Woodland in a playoff for the title. This was his first top-10 finish on either of the two main tours.

In March 2011, Woodland won his first PGA Tour title at the Transitions Championship by one stroke when fellow American Webb Simpson missed a par putt on the final hole. Just a few moments earlier Woodland had scrambled a fantastic par from the same position as Simpson on the last, after hitting his second shot over the back of the green. This win secured Woodland a place at the 2011 Masters Tournament and also elevated him to what was then a career high 53rd in the Official World Golf Ranking. He later earned an invitation into the U.S. Open after moving into the Top 50. He left the tournament with an OWGR ranking of 39th. In November 2011, he won the Omega Mission Hills World Cup with Matt Kuchar. He finished 2011 ranked 17th on the PGA Tour money list and 51st in the OWGR. He had ended 2009 ranked 962 and 2010 591.

Woodland reached the final of the 2015 WGC-Cadillac Match Play, where he lost to Rory McIlroy, and moved to a career-best 32nd in the OWGR.

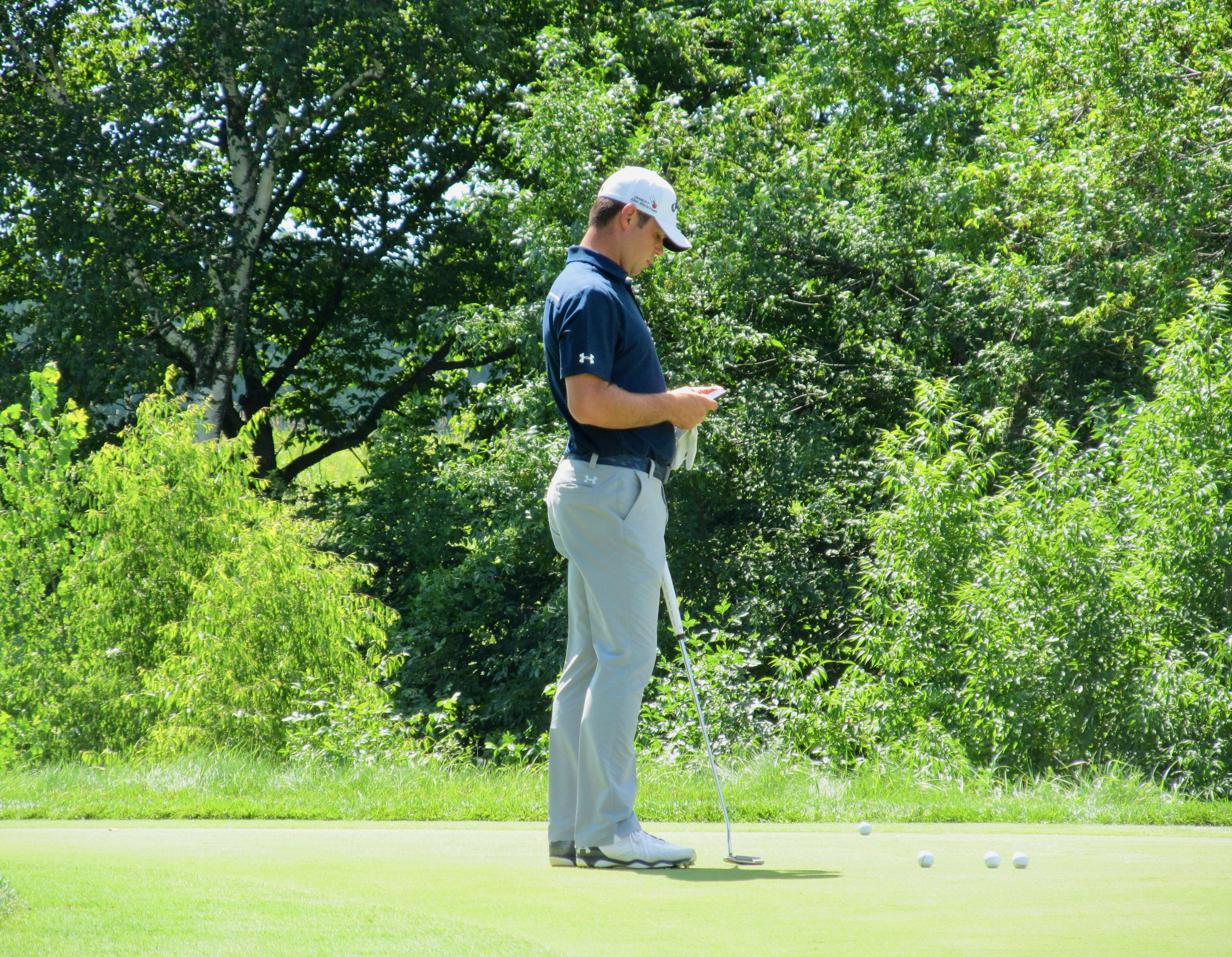
Woodland at the 2015 PGA Championship

In February 2018, Woodland won his third PGA Tour event, at the Waste Management Phoenix Open in a hole-by-hole playoff over Chez Reavie. After finishing tied at 18 under, Woodland won with a par on the first extra hole to end a five-year drought on tour. Woodland moved up to fifth in the season's FedEx Cup standings.

Woodland held the 36-hole lead at the PGA Championship in 2018 with a total 130, which was a tournament record through the first two rounds. He led by a stroke over Kevin Kisner at the halfway stage. He started the final round at nine under par, three shots behind leader Brooks Koepka. He finished in a tie for sixth with a score of 10 under par, six strokes behind the winner Koepka.

In January 2019, Woodland held the lead entering the final round at the winners-only Sentry Tournament of Champions at Kapalua Resort in Maui, Hawaii. He shot a five-under-par 68 but still lost to champion Xander Schauffele who shot a course record-tying 62.

In February 2019, Woodland invited Amy Bockerstette, a collegiate golfer with Down syndrome, to play the par-3 16th hole at TPC Scottsdale during a Tuesday practice round at the Waste Management Phoenix Open. After hitting her tee shot into a greenside bunker, Bockerstette surprised Woodland by parring the hole in front of a roaring crowd. The PGA Tour's video capturing the moment went viral, receiving 43 million views across various social media platforms.

Woodland sinking the winning putt at the 2019 U.S. Open, followed by the trophy presentation

At the U.S. Open in June 2019, Woodland held the 54-hole lead at Pebble Beach Golf Links. On Sunday, he shot a 2-under-par 69 for 271 (−13), which gave him a three-shot margin over the runner-up, two-time defending champion Koepka. Woodland became the fourth champion in U.S. Open history who was double-digits under-par. The victory was his first major and his sixth professional win. In his previous thirty starts in majors, Woodland had only carded two top-ten finishes, both in the PGA Championship (2018, 2019). The win at the U.S. Open moved him from 25th to 12th in the Official World Golf Ranking. At the post-win press conference, Woodland FaceTimed Bockerstette live, telling her "I used your positive energy." Two days later, Woodland joined Bockerstette with a surprise appearance on The Today Show where, pointing to the U.S. Open trophy in Bockerstette's hands, he told her "We won this together."

In December 2019, Woodland played on the U.S. team at the 2019 Presidents Cup at Royal Melbourne Golf Club in Australia. The U.S. team won 16–14. Woodland went 1–2–1 and lost his Sunday singles match against Im Sung-jae.

Woodland finished runner-up at the Houston Open in March 2025, one stroke behind Min Woo Lee. This was Woodland's first top-5 finish since his brain surgery in 2023.

In March 2026, Woodland shot a tournament-record, 21-under 259 at the Houston Open to win the event by five strokes over Nicolai Højgaard. It was Woodland's first professional victory since the 2019 U.S. Open and his fifth PGA Tour victory. The win earned him a spot in the field for the Masters Tournament.

== Personal life ==
Woodland married Gabby Granado in 2016. They had their first child, a son named Jaxson, in 2017. Jaxson was born ten weeks premature; he was originally a twin, but his sibling died in utero. The couple had identical twin daughters in 2019.

In August 2023, Woodland announced that he had been diagnosed with a brain tumor. He had experienced symptoms since April 2023, such as loss of appetite, regular feelings of fear, and partial seizures. An MRI in May discovered the tumor. Woodland was prescribed anti-seizure medication and continued to play on tour, making six cuts in his seven starts following the MRI. The medication had side effects including memory loss so the decision was made to undergo brain surgery, which took place on September 18, 2023. He wrote letters to his wife and children in case he did not survive the operation, but it was successful and he returned to play on the PGA Tour four months later.

In February 2025, Woodland was awarded the PGA Tour Courage Award in recognition of his recovery from surgery. The surgery did not fully remove his brain tumor and the residual tumor sits near his amygdala, which controls emotions, in particular fear and anxiety. In March 2026, he revealed that he had been diagnosed with post-traumatic stress disorder (PTSD) due to episodes of anxiety and hypervigilance since the surgery. Woodland stated that, during the second round of the 2026 Houston Open, "I battled the last 10 holes thinking people were trying to kill me. ... People ask me, 'How was the win?' The one thing I know is having this brain tumor and having PTSD, it doesn't matter if I win or lose. It doesn't care."

== Amateur wins ==
- 2005 Cleveland State Invitational, Kansas Amateur
- 2006 Kansas Invitational
- 2007 All-American Golf Classic, Louisiana Classics, Kansas Amateur

== Professional wins (7) ==
=== PGA Tour wins (5) ===
Legend
Major championships (1)
Other PGA Tour (4)

No.	Date	Tournament	Winning score	To par	Margin of victory	Runner(s)-up
1	Mar 20, 2011	Transitions Championship	67-68-67-67=269	−15	1 stroke	(United States) Webb Simpson
2	Aug 4, 2013	Reno–Tahoe Open	44 pts (14-7-16-7=44)		9 points	(United States) Jonathan Byrd, (Argentina) Andrés Romero
3	Feb 4, 2018	Waste Management Phoenix Open	67-68-67-64=266	−18	Playoff	(United States) Chez Reavie
4	Jun 16, 2019	U.S. Open	68-65-69-69=271	−13	3 strokes	(United States) Brooks Koepka
5	Mar 29, 2026	Texas Children's Houston Open	64-63-65-67=259	−21	5 strokes	(Denmark) Nicolai Højgaard

PGA Tour playoff record (1–2)

No.	Year	Tournament	Opponent(s)	Result
1	2011	Bob Hope Classic	(United States) Bill Haas, (Venezuela) Jhonattan Vegas	Vegas won with par on second extra hole Haas eliminated by birdie on first hole
2	2013	CIMB Classic	(United States) Ryan Moore	Lost to birdie on first extra hole
3	2018	Waste Management Phoenix Open	(United States) Chez Reavie	Won with par on first extra hole

=== Adams Pro Tour wins (1) ===
- 2008 Southwest Kansas Pro-Am

=== Other wins (1) ===
No.	Date	Tournament	Winning score	To par	Margin of victory	Runners-up
1	Nov 27, 2011	Omega Mission Hills World Cup (with (United States) Matt Kuchar)	64-70-63-67=264	−24	2 strokes	England − Ian Poulter and Justin Rose, Germany − Alex Čejka and Martin Kaymer

== Major championships ==
=== Wins (1) ===
Year	Championship	54 holes	Winning score	Margin	Runner-up
2019	U.S. Open	1 shot lead	−13 (68-65-69-69=271)	3 strokes	(United States) Brooks Koepka

=== Results timeline ===
Results not in chronological order in 2020.

Tournament	2009	2010	2011	2012	2013	2014	2015	2016	2017	2018
Masters Tournament			T24	WD		T26	CUT		CUT	CUT
U.S. Open	T47	CUT	T23	CUT		T52	CUT		T50	T36
The Open Championship			T30	T34		T39	T58	T12	T70	T67
PGA Championship			T12	T42	74	CUT		CUT	T22	T6

Tournament	2019	2020	2021	2022	2023	2024	2025	2026
Masters Tournament	T32	CUT	T40	CUT	T14	CUT		T33
PGA Championship	T8	T58	T38	T34	CUT	T60	CUT	CUT
U.S. Open	1	CUT	T50	T10	T49	CUT	CUT	T7
The Open Championship	CUT	NT	CUT	CUT	T55	T50		CUT

Win
Top 10
Did not play

CUT = missed the half-way cut
WD = withdrew
"T" indicates a tie for a place
NT = no tournament due to COVID-19 pandemic

=== Summary ===
Tournament	Wins	2nd	3rd	Top-5	Top-10	Top-25	Events	Cuts made
Masters Tournament	0	0	0	0	0	2	13	7
PGA Championship	0	0	0	0	2	4	15	10
U.S. Open	1	0	0	1	3	4	16	10
The Open Championship	0	0	0	0	0	1	13	9
Totals	1	0	0	1	5	11	57	36

- Most consecutive cuts made – 6 (twice)
- Longest streak of top-10s – 2 (2019 PGA – 2019 U.S. Open)

== Results in The Players Championship ==
Tournament	2011	2012	2013	2014	2015	2016	2017	2018	2019
The Players Championship	CUT	CUT		T11	CUT	T28	T75	CUT	T30

Tournament	2020	2021	2022	2023	2024	2025	2026
The Players Championship	C	CUT	CUT	T54	72	CUT	CUT

Did not play

CUT = missed the halfway cut
"T" indicates a tie for a place
C = canceled after the first round due to the COVID-19 pandemic

== Results in World Golf Championships ==
Results not in chronological order before 2015.

Tournament	2011	2012	2013	2014	2015	2016	2017	2018	2019	2020	2021
Championship		T29		T16	T23		T38	T50	T17	T12	43
Match Play		R64		R64	2		T39	T29	T17	NT^{1}	
Invitational	T45			T19	T57		T63	T17	T55	T57	
Champions				T56	T23	T47				NT^{1}	NT^{1}

^{1}Cancelled due to COVID-19 pandemic

Top 10
Did not play

QF, R16, R32, R64 = Round in which player lost in match play
NT = No tournament
"T" = Tied

== U.S. national team appearances ==
Professional

- World Cup: 2011 (winners)
- Presidents Cup: 2019 (winners)

== See also ==
- 2008 PGA Tour Qualifying School graduates
- 2010 PGA Tour Qualifying School graduates
