= 2017 Players Championship =

Tournament information
- Dates: May 11–14, 2017
- Location: Ponte Vedra Beach, Florida; 30.198°N 81.394°W
- Courses: TPC Sawgrass, Stadium Course
- Tour: PGA Tour

Statistics
- Par: 72
- Length: 7,189 yards (6,574 m)
- Field: 145 players, 82 after cut 71 after second cut
- Cut: 146 (+2); 222 (+6) after second cut

Champion
- (South Korea) Kim Si-woo
- 278 (−10)
- Location in the United States Location in Florida

The 2017 Players Championship was the 44th Players Championship, held May 11–14 at TPC Sawgrass in Ponte Vedra Beach, Florida, and the 36th edition held at the Stadium Course.

Kim Si-woo, age 21, shot a final round 69 to win at 278 (−10), three strokes ahead of runners-up Louis Oosthuizen and Ian Poulter. Starting the final round two strokes back in fourth place, Kim became the championship's youngest winner by over 1½ years, passing Adam Scott (2004).

In the preceding six months on the PGA Tour, Kim had missed the cut or withdrawn in most of his events and was without a top twenty finish. The win was his second on tour and moved him up 47 places in the world rankings, from 75 to 28.

In the final round, Rafa Cabrera-Bello recorded the first-ever double eagle at the par-5 16th hole, then birdied the par-3 17th. His tee shot on 18 hooked into the water, but he chipped in to save par and tied for fourth.

Defending champion Jason Day shot 80 on Sunday and was seventeen strokes back, tied for sixtieth place.

== Venue ==
The course was shortened by 26 yards (24 m) this year: #12 was reduced by 56 yards while two other holes were lengthened (#7 by 9 yards and #15 by 21 yards).

=== Course layout ===
The 2017 Players Championship
Tee	Rating/Slope	1	2	3	4	5	6	7	8	9	Out	10	11	12	13	14	15	16	17	18	In	Total
Yards	76.4 / 155	423	532	177	384	471	393	451	237	583	3,651	424	558	302	181	481	470	523	137	462	3,538	7,189
Par		4	5	3	4	4	4	4	3	5	36	4	5	4	3	4	4	5	3	4	36	72

== Field ==
The field consisted of a minimum of 144 players meeting the following criteria:

1. Winners of PGA Tour events since last Players

Aaron Baddeley (3), Daniel Berger (3,10), Jonas Blixt (3), Wesley Bryan (10,12), Greg Chalmers, Kevin Chappell (3,10), Jason Day (3,5,6,8,9,10), Rickie Fowler (3,6,10,14), Sergio García (3,5,10), Cody Gribble, Adam Hadwin (3,10,14), Brian Harman (3), Russell Henley (3), Mackenzie Hughes, Billy Hurley III (3), Dustin Johnson (3,5,8,10,14), Kim Si-woo (3), Russell Knox (3,8,10), Marc Leishman (3,9,10), Hideki Matsuyama (3,8,10,14), William McGirt (3,9,10), Rory McIlroy (3,5,7,8,10), Ryan Moore (3,10), Rod Pampling, Pat Perez (4,14), D. A. Points, Jon Rahm (10,14), Patrick Reed (3,10), Cameron Smith, Jordan Spieth (3,5,7,10,14), Brendan Steele (3,14), Henrik Stenson (3,5,10), Hudson Swafford (3), Justin Thomas (3,10,14), Jhonattan Vegas (3), Jimmy Walker (3,5,10)

2. Winner of the 2016 Olympic Golf Tournament

Justin Rose (3,5,10,14)

3. Top 125 from previous season's FedEx Cup points list

Blayne Barber, Ricky Barnes, Zac Blair, Jason Bohn, Keegan Bradley, Scott Brown, Chad Campbell, Paul Casey (10), Roberto Castro, Alex Čejka, K. J. Choi, Ben Crane, Graham DeLaet, Luke Donald, Jason Dufner (5), Harris English, Derek Fathauer, Tony Finau, Jim Furyk, Robert Garrigus, Lucas Glover, Fabián Gómez, Branden Grace (10), Emiliano Grillo (10), Bill Haas (10), James Hahn, David Hearn, Jim Herman, Charley Hoffman (10), J. B. Holmes (10), Billy Horschel (7), Mark Hubbard, John Huh, Freddie Jacobson, Zach Johnson (5), Kang Sung-hoon, Smylie Kaufman, Jerry Kelly, Michael Kim, Chris Kirk, Kevin Kisner (10), Patton Kizzire, Brooks Koepka (10), Jason Kokrak, Matt Kuchar (6,10), Anirban Lahiri, Martin Laird, Danny Lee, Spencer Levin, David Lingmerth (9), Luke List, Andrew Loupe, Jamie Lovemark, Shane Lowry (8), Peter Malnati, Ben Martin, Graeme McDowell, Troy Merritt, Phil Mickelson (5,10), Bryce Molder, Francesco Molinari (10), Kevin Na, Noh Seung-yul, Sean O'Hair, Louis Oosthuizen (10), Ryan Palmer, Scott Piercy, Chez Reavie, Kyle Reifers, Patrick Rodgers, Charl Schwartzel (10), Adam Scott (5,8,10), Webb Simpson (5), Vijay Singh, Kyle Stanley, Shawn Stefani, Brett Stegmaier, Robert Streb, Kevin Streelman, Steve Stricker, Brian Stuard, Daniel Summerhays, Vaughn Taylor, Cameron Tringale, Tyrone van Aswegen, Harold Varner III, Johnson Wagner, Bubba Watson (5,8,10), Boo Weekley, Danny Willett (5,10), Gary Woodland (10)

- Jon Curran, Charles Howell III, Colt Knost, John Senden, Brandt Snedeker (10), and David Toms did not play.

4. Top 125 (medical)

Patrick Cantlay, Brian Gay, Ian Poulter

5. Major champions from the past five years

Ernie Els, Martin Kaymer (6,10)

6. Players Championship winners from the past five years

- Tiger Woods did not play.

7. The Tour Championship winners from the past three years

8. World Golf Championship winners from the past three years

9. Memorial Tournament and Arnold Palmer Invitational winners since 2015

Matt Every

10. Top 50 from the Official World Golf Ranking

Rafa Cabrera-Bello, Ross Fisher, Matt Fitzpatrick, Tommy Fleetwood, Tyrrell Hatton, Yuta Ikeda, Alex Norén, Lee Westwood, Bernd Wiesberger

- Thomas Pieters did not play.

11. Senior Players champion from prior year

Bernhard Langer

12. Web.com Tour money leader from prior season

13. Money leader during the Web.com Tour Finals

Grayson Murray

14. Top 10 current year FedEx Cup points leaders

15. Remaining positions and alternates filled through current year FedEx Cup standings

== Round summaries ==
=== First round ===
Thursday, May 11, 2017

William McGirt and Mackenzie Hughes shared the lead after both shot 67. Masters champion Sergio García made a hole-in-one on the 17th hole after recovering from a poor start for a round of 73.

Place	Player	Score	To par
T1	(Canada) Mackenzie Hughes	67	−5
T1	(United States) William McGirt	67	−5
T3	(United States) J. B. Holmes	68	−4
T3	(Sweden) Alex Norén	68	−4
T3	(Spain) Jon Rahm	68	−4
T3	(United States) Chez Reavie	68	−4
T7	(United States) Daniel Berger	69	−3
T7	(Spain) Rafa Cabrera-Bello	69	−3
T7	(United States) Patrick Cantlay	69	−3
T7	(United States) Cody Gribble	69	−3
T7	(South Korea) Kim Si-woo	69	−3
T7	(Sweden) David Lingmerth	69	−3
T7	(Italy) Francesco Molinari	69	−3
T7	(South Africa) Louis Oosthuizen	69	−3
T7	(United States) Kyle Stanley	69	−3
T7	(United States) Brendan Steele	69	−3
T7	(United States) Daniel Summerhays	69	−3

=== Second round ===
Friday, May 12, 2017

Place	Player	Score	To par
T1	(South Africa) Louis Oosthuizen	69-66=135	−9
T1	(United States) Kyle Stanley	69-66=135	−9
3	(United States) J. B. Holmes	68-69=137	−7
4	(Fiji) Vijay Singh	70-68=138	−6
T5	(Spain) Rafa Cabrera-Bello	69-70=139	−5
T5	(United States) Patrick Cantlay	69-70=139	−5
T5	(Canada) David Hearn	70-69=139	−5
T5	(Sweden) Alex Norén	68-71=139	−5
T5	(England) Ian Poulter	72-67=139	−5
T10	(England) Paul Casey	71-69=140	−4
T10	(United States) Lucas Glover	70-70=140	−4
T10	(Spain) Jon Rahm	68-72=140	−4
T10	(United States) Chez Reavie	68-72=140	−4
T10	(United States) Webb Simpson	71-69=140	−4
T10	(United States) Brendan Steele	69-71=140	−4

=== Third round ===
Saturday, May 13, 2017

Under PGA Tour rules, when more than 78 players make the 36-hole cut, a 54-hole cut is employed to reduce the field to the top 70 and ties. This second cut reduced the field from 82 to 71, which included 2012 champion Matt Kuchar, who fell to 82nd at 225 (+9) after an 81.

Place	Player	Score	To par
T1	(United States) J. B. Holmes	68-69-70=207	−9
T1	(United States) Kyle Stanley	69-66-72=207	−9
3	(South Africa) Louis Oosthuizen	69-66-73=208	−8
4	(South Korea) Kim Si-woo	69-72-68=209	−7
T5	(Argentina) Emiliano Grillo	72-71-67=210	−6
T5	(England) Ian Poulter	72-67-71=210	−6
T7	(United States) Patrick Cantlay	69-70-72=211	−5
T7	(Spain) Sergio García	73-71-67=211	−5
T7	(Sweden) Alex Norén	68-71-72=211	−5
T10	(Spain) Rafa Cabrera-Bello	69-70-73=212	−4
T10	(Italy) Francesco Molinari	69-74-69=212	−4
T10	(United States) Pat Perez	74-72-66=212	−4

=== Final round ===
Sunday, May 14, 2017

Champion
(c) = past champion

Place	Player	Score	To par	Money ($)
1	(South Korea) Kim Si-woo	69-72-68-69=278	−10	1,890,000
T2	(South Africa) Louis Oosthuizen	69-66-73-73=281	−7	924,000
T2	(England) Ian Poulter	72-67-71-71=281	−7	924,000
T4	(Spain) Rafa Cabrera-Bello	69-70-73-70=282	−6	462,000
T4	(United States) Kyle Stanley	69-66-72-75=282	−6	462,000
T6	(United States) Lucas Glover	70-70-73-70=283	−5	339,937
T6	(Italy) Francesco Molinari	69-74-69-71=283	−5	339,937
T6	(Australia) Adam Scott (c)	70-72-71-70=283	−5	339,937
T6	(United States) Brendan Steele	69-71-75-68=283	−5	339,937
10	(Sweden) Alex Norén	68-71-72-73=284	−4	283,500

Leaderboard below the top 10
Place	Player	Score	To par	Money ($)
11	(Argentina) Emiliano Grillo	72-71-67-75=285	−3	262,500
T12	(United States) Dustin Johnson	71-73-74-68=286	−2	212,625
T12	(United States) Smylie Kaufman	74-67-76-69=286	−2	212,625
T12	(United States) Chris Kirk	74-72-69-71=286	−2	212,625
T12	(Austria) Bernd Wiesberger	75-71-68-72=286	−2	212,625
T16	(United States) Blayne Barber	70-76-72-69=287	−1	152,250
T16	(Canada) Mackenzie Hughes	67-75-74-71=287	−1	152,250
T16	(United States) Brooks Koepka	74-69-71-73=287	−1	152,250
T16	(United States) Webb Simpson	71-69-77-70=287	−1	152,250
T16	(Fiji) Vijay Singh	70-68-79-70=287	−1	152,250
T16	(Sweden) Henrik Stenson (c)	72-70-74-71=287	−1	152,250
T22	(United States) Patrick Cantlay	69-70-72-77=288	E	92,137
T22	(England) Paul Casey	71-69-77-71=288	E	92,137
T22	(Japan) Yuta Ikeda	73-69-72-74=288	E	92,137
T22	(Japan) Hideki Matsuyama	72-71-76-69=288	E	92,137
T22	(United States) William McGirt	67-75-71-75=288	E	92,137
T22	(South Korea) Noh Seung-yul	73-69-75-71=288	E	92,137
T22	(United States) Pat Perez	74-72-66-76=288	E	92,137
T22	(United States) Patrick Reed	72-73-74-69=288	E	92,137
T30	(Spain) Sergio García (c)	73-71-67-78=289	+1	65,205
T30	(Canada) Adam Hadwin	71-72-76-70=289	+1	65,205
T30	(United States) Charley Hoffman	74-72-72-71=289	+1	65,205
T30	(South Korea) Kang Sung-hoon	71-75-72-71=289	+1	65,205
T30	(United States) Ben Martin	71-70-73-75=289	+1	65,205
T35	(United States) Kevin Chappell	72-72-73-73=290	+2	50,662
T35	(United States) Russell Henley	75-68-73-74=290	+2	50,662
T35	(United States) Jim Herman	71-75-72-72=290	+2	50,662
T35	(Northern Ireland) Rory McIlroy	73-71-71-75=290	+2	50,662
T35	(United States) Cameron Tringale	70-71-76-73=290	+2	50,662
T35	(United States) Harold Varner III	71-70-77-72=290	+2	50,662
T41	(Australia) Aaron Baddeley	70-73-76-72=291	+3	36,750
T41	(England) Tommy Fleetwood	74-67-76-74=291	+3	36,750
T41	(England) Tyrrell Hatton	76-70-71-74=291	+3	36,750
T41	(United States) J. B. Holmes	68-69-70-84=291	+3	36,750
T41	(United States) Billy Hurley III	71-72-76-72=291	+3	36,750
T41	(United States) Phil Mickelson (c)	70-72-78-71=291	+3	36,750
T41	(United States) Steve Stricker	72-70-73-76=291	+3	36,750
T48	(South Africa) Branden Grace	71-75-73-73=292	+4	26,712
T48	(United States) Cody Gribble	69-75-74-74=292	+4	26,712
T48	(United States) Zach Johnson	72-73-71-76=292	+4	26,712
T48	(Australia) Rod Pampling	72-74-74-72=292	+4	26,712
T48	(United States) Boo Weekley	70-76-73-73=292	+4	26,712
T53	(United States) Brian Harman	71-75-71-76=293	+5	24,430
T53	(United States) Ryan Moore	73-72-74-74=293	+5	24,430
T53	(United States) Daniel Summerhays	69-73-75-76=293	+5	24,430
T56	(United States) Roberto Castro	71-71-76-76=294	+6	23,625
T56	(United States) Kevin Kisner	71-75-73-75=294	+6	23,625
T56	(United States) Chez Reavie	68-72-79-75=294	+6	23,625
T56	(United States) Jimmy Walker	71-74-73-76=294	+6	23,625
T60	(United States) Keegan Bradley	75-69-73-78=295	+7	22,680
T60	(Australia) Jason Day (c)	70-72-73-80=295	+7	22,680
T60	(United States) Jason Dufner	73-71-77-74=295	+7	22,680
T60	(United States) Rickie Fowler (c)	70-74-72-79=295	+7	22,680
T60	(United States) Michael Kim	72-74-73-76=295	+7	22,680
T65	(United States) Ricky Barnes	70-74-76-76=296	+8	21,735
T65	(United States) Daniel Berger	69-72-77-78=296	+8	21,735
T65	(England) Justin Rose	74-71-71-80=296	+8	21,735
T65	(England) Lee Westwood	70-75-76-75=296	+8	21,735
T69	(Canada) David Hearn	70-69-80-78=297	+9	21,000
T69	(Germany) Martin Kaymer (c)	72-72-75-78=297	+9	21,000
T69	(Northern Ireland) Graeme McDowell	71-72-74-80=297	+9	21,000
T72	(Sweden) David Lingmerth	69-75-78=222	+6	20,370
T72	(Spain) Jon Rahm	68-72-82=222	+6	20,370
T72	(United States) Kevin Streelman	72-73-77=222	+6	20,370
T75	(United States) Jamie Lovemark	75-70-78=223	+7	19,635
T75	(United States) Brian Stuard	73-73-77=223	+7	19,635
T75	(United States) Justin Thomas	73-71-79=223	+7	19,635
T75	(United States) Gary Woodland	70-75-78=223	+7	19,635
T79	(Germany) Alex Čejka	75-70-79=224	+8	18,900
T79	(United States) Ben Crane	71-75-78=224	+8	18,900
T79	(United States) Grayson Murray	74-72-78=224	+8	18,900
82	(United States) Matt Kuchar (c)	73-71-81=225	+9	18,480
CUT	(United States) Scott Brown	74-73=147	+3	
CUT	(South Korea) K. J. Choi (c)	72-75=147	+3	
CUT	(England) Luke Donald	74-73=147	+3	
CUT	(United States) Tony Finau	73-74=147	+3	
CUT	(United States) Jim Furyk	73-74=147	+3	
CUT	(United States) James Hahn	72-75=147	+3	
CUT	(United States) John Huh	74-73=147	+3	
CUT	(United States) Jason Kokrak	73-74=147	+3	
CUT	(Scotland) Martin Laird	74-73=147	+3	
CUT	(United States) Spencer Levin	75-72=147	+3	
CUT	(United States) Luke List	78-69=147	+3	
CUT	(United States) Andrew Loupe	74-73=147	+3	
CUT	(United States) Hudson Swafford	76-71=147	+3	
CUT	(Venezuela) Jhonattan Vegas	78-69=147	+3	
CUT	(United States) Wesley Bryan	72-76=148	+4	
CUT	(Canada) Graham DeLaet	74-74=148	+4	
CUT	(Scotland) Russell Knox	76-72=148	+4	
CUT	(Australia) Marc Leishman	73-75=148	+4	
CUT	(United States) Ryan Palmer	71-77=148	+4	
CUT	(Australia) Cameron Smith	71-77=148	+4	
CUT	(United States) Jordan Spieth	73-75=148	+4	
CUT	(Sweden) Jonas Blixt	77-72=149	+5	
CUT	(United States) Chad Campbell	74-75=149	+5	
CUT	(England) Ross Fisher	76-73=149	+5	
CUT	(England) Matt Fitzpatrick	76-73=149	+5	
CUT	(United States) Bill Haas	76-73=149	+5	
CUT	(Sweden) Freddie Jacobson	76-73=149	+5	
CUT	(Germany) Bernhard Langer	71-78=149	+5	
CUT	(United States) Kyle Reifers	74-75=149	+5	
CUT	(United States) Patrick Rodgers	73-76=149	+5	
CUT	(United States) Shawn Stefani	74-75=149	+5	
CUT	(Australia) Greg Chalmers	73-77=150	+6	
CUT	(South Africa) Ernie Els	74-76=150	+6	
CUT	(United States) Brian Gay	74-76=150	+6	
CUT	(India) Anirban Lahiri	75-75=150	+6	
CUT	(Republic of Ireland) Shane Lowry	74-76=150	+6	
CUT	(United States) Peter Malnati	75-75=150	+6	
CUT	(United States) Troy Merritt	74-76=150	+6	
CUT	(South Africa) Charl Schwartzel	76-74=150	+6	
CUT	(United States) Robert Streb	75-75=150	+6	
CUT	(United States) Jason Bohn	75-76=151	+7	
CUT	(Argentina) Fabián Gómez	78-73=151	+7	
CUT	(United States) Billy Horschel	75-76=151	+7	
CUT	(United States) Mark Hubbard	76-75=151	+7	
CUT	(United States) Jerry Kelly	74-77=151	+7	
CUT	(United States) Bryce Molder	74-77=151	+7	
CUT	(United States) Bubba Watson	76-75=151	+7	
CUT	(United States) Matt Every	74-78=152	+8	
CUT	(United States) Derek Fathauer	76-76=152	+8	
CUT	(United States) Sean O'Hair	74-78=152	+8	
CUT	(United States) D. A. Points	73-79=152	+8	
CUT	(United States) Brett Stegmaier	76-76=152	+8	
CUT	(United States) Vaughn Taylor	75-77=152	+8	
CUT	(United States) Johnson Wagner	74-78=152	+8	
CUT	(South Africa) Tyrone van Aswegen	75-78=153	+9	
CUT	(United States) Patton Kizzire	77-77=154	+10	
CUT	(United States) Robert Garrigus	75-80=155	+11	
CUT	(New Zealand) Danny Lee	78-77=155	+11	
CUT	(United States) Zac Blair	76-80=156	+12	
CUT	(United States) Harris English	84-76=160	+16	
CUT	(United States) Scott Piercy	80-84=164	+20	
WD	(England) Danny Willett	79	+7	
WD	(United States) Kevin Na			

==== Scorecard ====
Final round

Hole	1	2	3	4	5	6	7	8	9	10	11	12	13	14	15	16	17	18
Par	4	5	3	4	4	4	4	3	5	4	5	4	3	4	4	5	3	4
(South Korea) Kim	−8	−8	−8	−8	−8	−8	−9	−9	−10	−10	−10	−10	−10	−10	−10	−10	−10	−10
(South Africa) Oosthuizen	−8	−9	−9	−7	−7	−7	−7	−7	−6	−6	−8	−8	−7	−6	−6	−7	−7	−7
(England) Poulter	−6	−7	−7	−7	−7	−8	−8	−8	−8	−8	−9	−8	−8	−8	−8	−8	−8	−7
(Spain) Cabrera-Bello	−4	−4	−5	−5	−5	−5	−5	−4	−3	−3	−3	−2	−2	−2	−2	−5	−6	−6
(United States) Stanley	−8	−8	−7	−7	−7	−8	−8	−7	−7	−6	−6	−6	−6	−5	−5	−5	−6	−6
(United States) Glover	−3	−4	−4	−4	−5	−6	−7	−6	−7	−7	−8	−8	−7	−6	−5	−5	−6	−5
(Italy) Molinari	−4	−5	−5	−5	−4	−5	−5	−5	−4	−4	−5	−5	−5	−5	−5	−5	−5	−5
(Australia) Scott	−3	−3	−3	−2	−2	−2	−2	−2	−1	−1	−2	−3	−3	−3	−3	−4	−5	−5
(United States) Steele	−2	−1	−1	−1	−1	−2	−2	−3	−4	−4	−5	−5	−4	−3	−3	−4	−4	−5
(Sweden) Noren	−5	−4	−4	−3	−2	−2	−3	−3	−3	−3	−4	−4	−4	−3	−3	−4	−4	−4
(Argentina) Grillo	−6	−6	−6	−5	−4	−4	−3	−3	−3	−3	−3	−3	−4	−2	−2	−3	−3	−3
(United States) Cantlay	−5	−5	−6	−6	−6	−5	−3	−2	E	E	−2	−2	−2	E	−1	−1	−1	E
(United States) Perez	−4	−3	−2	−1	E	E	+1	+2	+2	+3	+2	+1	+1	+1	+1	E	E	E
(Spain) García	−5	−6	−5	−3	−3	−2	−1	E	E	E	E	−1	−2	E	−1	−1	−1	+1
(United States) Holmes	−8	−9	−8	−8	−7	−7	−5	−4	−5	−4	−5	−6	−6	−5	−4	−4	+1	+3

Cumulative tournament scores, relative to par

Double Eagle	Eagle	Birdie	Bogey	Double bogey	Triple bogey+
