= 2018 FedEx Cup Playoffs =

Tournament information
- Dates: August 23 – September 23, 2018
- Location: Ridgewood Country Club; TPC Boston; Aronimink Golf Club; East Lake Golf Club
- Tour: PGA Tour

Statistics
- Field: 125 for The Northern Trust; 100 for Dell Technologies Championship; 70 for BMW Championship; 30 for Tour Championship
- Prize fund: $35,000,000 bonus money
- Winner's share: $10,000,000 bonus money

Champion
- (England) Justin Rose
- 2,260 points

The 2018 FedEx Cup Playoffs, the series of four golf tournaments that determined the season champion on the U.S.-based PGA Tour, was played from August 23 to September 23. It included the following four events:

- The Northern Trust – Ridgewood Country Club, Paramus, New Jersey
- Dell Technologies Championship – TPC Boston, Norton, Massachusetts
- BMW Championship – Aronimink Golf Club, Newtown Square, Pennsylvania
- Tour Championship – East Lake Golf Club, Atlanta, Georgia

These were the 12th FedEx Cup playoffs since their inception in 2007.

The point distributions can be seen here.

== Regular season rankings ==
Place	Player	Points	Events
1	(United States) Dustin Johnson	2,717	16
2	(United States) Justin Thomas	2,634	19
3	(United States) Brooks Koepka	2,012	13
4	(England) Justin Rose	1,991	14
5	(United States) Bubba Watson	1,879	20
6	(Australia) Jason Day	1,771	16
7	(United States) Webb Simpson	1,710	22
8	(Italy) Francesco Molinari	1,682	17
9	(United States) Bryson DeChambeau	1,617	22
10	(United States) Patrick Reed	1,555	22

== The Northern Trust ==
The Northern Trust was played August 23–26. Of the 125 players eligible to play in the event, five did not enter: Rickie Fowler (ranked 17), Rory McIlroy (21), Henrik Stenson (50), Patrick Rodgers (93), and Bud Cauley (122). Brandt Snedeker (30) was a late withdrawal, reducing the field to 119. 80 made the second-round cut at 142 (E).

Bryson DeChambeau won by four strokes over Tony Finau. The top 100 players in the points standings advanced to the Dell Technologies Championship. This included six players who were outside the top 100 prior to The Northern Trust: Nick Watney (ranked 102nd to 67th), Danny Lee (103 to 98), Scott Stallings (107 to 94), Bronson Burgoon (111 to 73), Brian Stuard (118 to 99) and Jhonattan Vegas (123 to 87). Six players started the tournament within the top 100 but ended the tournament outside the top 100, ending their playoff chances: Patrick Rodgers (ranked 93rd to 104th), Brandon Harkins (94 to 103), Trey Mullinax (95 to 102), Charl Schwartzel (96 to 105), Rory Sabbatini (97 to 109), and Alex Čejka (99 to 108).

					FedEx Cup rank	
Place	Player	Score	To par	Winnings ($)	After	Before
1	(United States) Bryson DeChambeau	68-66-63-69=266	−18	1,620,000	1	9
2	(United States) Tony Finau	69-67-66-68=270	−14	972,000	4	12
T3	(United States) Billy Horschel	69-69-65-68=271	−13	522,000	14	41
T3	(Australia) Cameron Smith	69-68-65-69=271	−13	522,000	16	53
T5	(United States) Ryan Palmer	68-67-72-65=272	−12	328,500	50	100
T5	(Australia) Adam Scott	69-64-70-69=272	−12	328,500	40	73
T5	(United States) Aaron Wise	70-68-67-67=272	−12	328,500	15	27
T8	(United States) Patrick Cantlay	69-67-68-69=273	−11	261,000	11	14
T8	(United States) Brooks Koepka	67-65-72-69=273	−11	261,000	5	3
T8	(United States) Justin Thomas	69-67-69-68=273	−11	261,000	3	2

- Par 71 course

== Dell Technologies Championship ==
The Dell Technologies Championship was played August 31 – September 3. Of the 100 players eligible to play in the event, two did not: Francesco Molinari (ranked 13) and Rickie Fowler (22). 77 players made the second-round cut at 144 (+2).

Bryson DeChambeau won his second straight playoff event, winning by two strokes over Justin Rose. The top 70 players in the points standings advanced to the BMW Championship. This included six players who were outside the top 70 prior to Dell Technologies Championship: Pan Cheng-tsung (ranked 72nd to 33rd), Tyrrell Hatton (71 to 54), Abraham Ancer (92 to 56), Brice Garnett (81 to 63), Peter Uihlein (83 to 64), and Keith Mitchell (78 to 66). Six players started the tournament within the top 70 but ended the tournament outside the top 70, ending their playoff chances: Ryan Moore (ranked 60th to 71st), Kim Meen-whee (61 to 72), Stewart Cink (65 to 73), Nick Watney (67 to 74), Jimmy Walker (68 to 75), and Kevin Streelman (70 to 77).

					FedEx Cup rank	
Place	Player	Score	To par	Winnings ($)	After	Before
1	(United States) Bryson DeChambeau	70-68-63-67=268	−16	1,620,000	1	1
2	(England) Justin Rose	65-67-70-68=270	−14	972,000	3	6
3	(Australia) Cameron Smith	69-66-67-69=271	−13	612,000	8	16
T4	(United States) Tony Finau	69-68-67-68=272	−12	372,000	4	4
T4	(Japan) Hideki Matsuyama	71-69-67-65=272	−12	372,000	28	58
T4	(Taiwan) Pan Cheng-tsung	69-68-69-66=272	−12	372,000	33	72
T7	(Mexico) Abraham Ancer	66-69-65-73=273	−11	261,900	56	92
T7	(Spain) Rafa Cabrera-Bello	68-68-69-68=273	−11	261,900	37	59
T7	(Argentina) Emiliano Grillo	72-67-64-70=273	−11	261,900	29	48
T7	(United States) Dustin Johnson	68-69-72-64=273	−11	261,900	2	2
T7	(United States) Bubba Watson	72-68-67-66=273	−11	261,900	7	7

- Par 71 course

== BMW Championship ==
The BMW Championship was played September 6–10. Of the 70 players eligible to play in the event, only Daniel Berger (ranked 65) did not play. There was no cut. Due to weather conditions, the fourth round was delayed until September 10.

Keegan Bradley won on the first hole of a sudden-death playoff with Justin Rose. The top 30 players in the points standings advanced to the Tour Championship. This included two players who were outside the top 30 prior to the BMW Championship: Bradley (ranked 52 to 6) and Xander Schauffele (41 to 18). Two players started the tournament within the top 30 but ended the tournament outside the top 30, ending their playoff chances: Jordan Spieth (27 to 31) and Emiliano Grillo (29 to 32).

					FedEx Cup rank	
Place	Player	Score	To par	Winnings ($)	After	Before
1	(United States) Keegan Bradley	66-64-66-64=260	−20	1,620,000	6	52
2	(England) Justin Rose	66-63-64-67=260	−20	972,000	2	3
T3	(United States) Billy Horschel	64-67-66-64=261	−19	522,000	9	15
T3	(United States) Xander Schauffele	63-64-67-67=261	−19	522,000	18	41
5	(Northern Ireland) Rory McIlroy	62-69-63-68=262	−18	360,000	17	24
T6	(United States) Webb Simpson	66-67-65-65=263	−17	312,750	11	11
T6	(United States) Tiger Woods	62-70-66-65=263	−17	312,750	20	25
T8	(United States) Tony Finau	68-64-67-65=264	−16	252,000	3	4
T8	(England) Tommy Fleetwood	71-62-62-69=264	−16	252,000	19	20
T8	(United States) Rickie Fowler	65-65-65-69=264	−16	252,000	23	26
T8	(Italy) Francesco Molinari	70-63-64-67=264	−16	252,000	13	14

- Par 70 course

== Reset points ==
The points were reset after the BMW Championship.

Place	Player	Points	Reset points	Events
1	(United States) Bryson DeChambeau	5,789	2,000	25
2	(England) Justin Rose	4,391	1,800	17
3	(United States) Tony Finau	3,479	1,520	27
4	(United States) Dustin Johnson	3,425	1,296	19
5	(United States) Justin Thomas	3,327	1,280	22
6	(United States) Keegan Bradley	2,979	1,120	26
7	(United States) Brooks Koepka	2,723	960	16
8	(United States) Bubba Watson	2,481	800	23
9	(United States) Billy Horschel	2,260	640	26
10	(Australia) Cameron Smith	2,247	480	23

== Tour Championship ==
The Tour Championship was played September 20–23. All 30 golfers that qualified for the tournament played, and there was no cut. Tiger Woods won by two strokes over Billy Horschel, to finish second in the FedEx Cup rankings. Justin Rose finished tied for fourth place and took the FedEx Cup, 41 points ahead of Woods. He became the first player to win the FedEx Cup without winning any of the four events in the FedEx Cup Playoffs. Bryson DeChambeau, who led the rankings before the event, finished in 19th place and dropped to third place in the final rankings.

					FedEx Cup rank	
Place	Player	Score	To par	Winnings ($)	After	Before
1	(United States) Tiger Woods	65-68-65-71=269	−11	1,620,000	2	20
2	(United States) Billy Horschel	71-65-69-66=271	−9	972,000	5	9
3	(United States) Dustin Johnson	69-70-67-67=273	−7	621,000	4	4
T4	(Japan) Hideki Matsuyama	72-66-71-65=274	−6	372,000	13	27
T4	(England) Justin Rose	66-67-68-73=274	−6	372,000	1	2
T4	(United States) Webb Simpson	69-70-68-67=274	−6	372,000	11	11
T7	(United States) Rickie Fowler	65-72-73-65=275	−5	279,900	17	23
T7	(Northern Ireland) Rory McIlroy	67-68-66-74=275	−5	279,900	13	17
T7	(United States) Xander Schauffele	68-70-68-69=275	−5	279,900	15	18
T7	(United States) Justin Thomas	67-69-70-69=275	−5	279,900	7	5

- Par 70 course

== Final leaderboard ==
Place	Player	Points	Winnings ($)
1	(England) Justin Rose	2,260	10,000,000
2	(United States) Tiger Woods	2,219	3,000,000
3	(United States) Bryson DeChambeau	2,188	2,000,000
4	(United States) Dustin Johnson	2,056	1,500,000
5	(United States) Billy Horschel	1,840	1,000,000
6	(United States) Tony Finau	1,732	800,000
7	(United States) Justin Thomas	1,610	700,000
8	(United States) Keegan Bradley	1,253	600,000
9	(United States) Brooks Koepka	1,093	550,000
10	(United States) Bubba Watson	918	500,000

For the full list, see here.

== Table of qualifying players ==
Table key:

Win
Top-10 finish
Did not advance to next tournament
Played way into next tournament

	Player	Pre-Playoffs		The Northern Trust		Dell Technologies		BMW Champ.		Reset points	Tour Champ.	
	Player	Points	Rank	Finish	Rank after	Finish	Rank after	Finish	Rank after	Reset points	Finish	Final rank
(United States)	Dustin Johnson	2,717	1	T11	2	T7	2	T24	4	1,296	3	4
(United States)	Justin Thomas	2,634	2	T8	3	T24	5	T12	5	1,280	T7	7
(United States)	Brooks Koepka	2,012	3	T8	5	T12	6	T19	7	960	T26	9
(England)	Justin Rose	1,991	4	CUT	6	2	3	2	2	1,800	T4	1
(United States)	Bubba Watson	1,879	5	T34	7	T7	7	T16	8	800	29	10
(Australia)	Jason Day	1,771	6	T20	8	CUT	10	T24	12	368	18	16
(United States)	Webb Simpson	1,710	7	T28	9	T49	11	T6	11	384	T4	11
(Italy)	Francesco Molinari	1,682	8	CUT	13	DNP	14	T8	13	352	T21	T17
(United States)	Bryson DeChambeau	1,617	9	1	1	1	1	T19	1	2,000	19	3
(United States)	Patrick Reed	1,555	10	T25	12	T35	13	T19	15	314	28	22
(United States)	Phil Mickelson	1,546	11	T15	10	T12	9	T58	14	336	30	21
(United States)	Tony Finau	1,509	12	2	4	T4	4	T8	3	1,520	T15	6
(Spain)	Jon Rahm	1,430	13	CUT	17	T43	19	T24	24	170	T11	23
(United States)	Patrick Cantlay	1,388	14	T8	11	T24	12	T55	16	293	T21	20
(United States)	Patton Kizzire	1,386	15	T60	18	T71	21	T61	30	115	T21	30
(England)	Paul Casey	1,319	16	T60	20	T21	17	WD	26	151	T11	25
(United States)	Rickie Fowler	1,302	17	DNP	22	DNP	26	T8	23	182	T7	T17
(United States)	Kyle Stanley	1,198	18	T28	21	T12	16	T45	25	161	T15	27
(United States)	Kevin Na	1,183	19	T15	19	CUT	23	T12	22	194	25	28
(United States)	Tiger Woods	1,162	20	T40	25	T24	25	T6	20	219	1	2
(Northern Ireland)	Rory McIlroy	1,154	21	DNP	28	T12	24	5	17	272	T7	T13
(Australia)	Marc Leishman	1,148	22	T34	24	T21	22	T41	29	124	T21	29
(England)	Tommy Fleetwood*	1,130	23	T20	23	T24	20	T8	19	231	T11	19
(United States)	Chesson Hadley	1,122	24	T56	29	CUT	36	T61	44	–	–	44
(United States)	Pat Perez	1,116	25	T40	27	WD	34	T55	39	–	–	39
(United States)	Andrew Landry*	1,116	26	T76	30	T58	35	T35	37	–	–	37
(United States)	Aaron Wise*	1,086	27	T5	15	T69	18	T16	21	206	T15	24
(United States)	Xander Schauffele	1,081	28	CUT	34	T49	41	T3	18	251	T7	15
(United States)	Luke List	1,080	29	T48	31	CUT	40	T45	45	–	–	45
(United States)	Brandt Snedeker	1,077	30	DNP	35	T31	32	67	40	–	–	40
(United States)	Austin Cook*	1,060	31	T60	36	T62	42	T29	38	–	–	38
(United States)	Brian Harman	1,056	32	T48	32	T49	38	67	48	–	–	48
(United States)	Gary Woodland	1,044	33	T48	37	T24	30	T12	28	133	T11	26
(England)	Ian Poulter	1,030	34	T48	38	CUT	45	T51	50	–	–	50
(United States)	Andrew Putnam*	1,026	35	T78	39	T49	44	T16	33	–	–	33
(United States)	Chez Reavie	1,020	36	T20	26	CUT	31	T38	34	–	–	34
(United States)	Ryan Armour	1,006	37	T78	41	T35	43	T51	49	–	–	49
(United States)	Brendan Steele	998	38	CUT	42	CUT	51	64	56	–	–	56
(Sweden)	Alex Norén*	989	39	CUT	43	T43	50	T24	43	–	–	43
(United States)	Kevin Kisner	971	40	T73	44	T24	39	T58	47	–	–	47
(United States)	Billy Horschel	960	41	T3	14	WD	15	T3	9	640	2	5
(United States)	Beau Hossler*	957	42	T60	45	T35	49	T33	46	–	–	46
(United States)	Jordan Spieth	945	43	T25	33	T12	27	T55	31	–	–	31
(South Korea)	An Byeong-hun	913	44	T40	46	T31	46	T29	42	–	–	42
(Argentina)	Emiliano Grillo	901	45	T48	48	T7	29	T61	32	–	–	32
(South Korea)	Kim Si-woo	893	46	T76	49	T35	53	T41	55	–	–	55
(United States)	Charles Howell III	885	47	CUT	54	T58	57	T24	53	–	–	53
(United States)	Brian Gay	880	48	70	51	T62	55	T45	59	–	–	59
(United States)	Keegan Bradley	872	49	T34	47	T49	52	1	6	1,120	T26	8
(Sweden)	Henrik Stenson	868	50	DNP	55	T69	60	T29	57	–	–	57
(United States)	J. J. Spaun	849	51	T60	56	T66	62	T45	62	–	–	62
(United States)	Zach Johnson	839	52	T40	53	CUT	59	T33	58	–	–	58
(Australia)	Cameron Smith	821	53	T3	16	3	8	T65	10	480	20	12
(United States)	Scott Piercy	802	54	T48	57	DQ	68	T45	68	–	–	68
(United States)	Ryan Moore	795	55	CUT	60	T71	71	–	–	–	–	71
(Spain)	Rafa Cabrera-Bello	784	56	T60	59	T7	37	T41	41	–	–	41
(South Korea)	Kim Meen-whee	764	57	T48	61	75	72	–	–	–	–	72
(United States)	Stewart Cink	758	58	CUT	65	T62	73	–	–	–	–	73
(United States)	Chris Kirk	756	59	T78	64	T35	67	T41	66	–	–	66
(United States)	Ted Potter Jr.	744	60	T40	62	T66	70	T35	65	–	–	65
(United States)	Jimmy Walker	719	61	T71	68	T71	75	–	–	–	–	75
(United States)	Jason Kokrak	700	62	T40	66	T24	61	T19	52	–	–	52
(Taiwan)	Pan Cheng-tsung	693	63	T60	72	T4	33	T38	35	–	–	35
(United States)	Matt Kuchar	679	64	T60	74	T43	76	–	–	–	–	76
(United States)	Joel Dahmen*	676	65	CUT	76	CUT	80	–	–	–	–	80
(United States)	Michael Kim	675	66	CUT	77	CUT	81	–	–	–	–	81
(United States)	Kevin Streelman	673	67	T40	70	CUT	77	–	–	–	–	77
(United States)	Keith Mitchell*	659	68	CUT	78	20	66	T45	67	–	–	67
(United States)	J. B. Holmes	640	69	CUT	80	T49	82	–	–	–	–	82
(Canada)	Adam Hadwin	638	70	T11	52	T21	47	T19	36	–	–	36
(United States)	Brice Garnett	634	71	CUT	81	T12	63	T35	61	–	–	61
(United States)	Kelly Kraft	627	72	CUT	82	CUT	90	–	–	–	–	90
(Australia)	Adam Scott	623	73	T5	40	T49	48	T51	51	–	–	51
(South Africa)	Louis Oosthuizen	620	74	T28	69	T31	69	T58	69	–	–	69
(United States)	Troy Merritt	616	75	CUT	84	CUT	91	–	–	–	–	91
(Japan)	Hideki Matsuyama	607	76	T15	58	T4	28	15	27	142	T4	T13
(Japan)	Satoshi Kodaira*	600	77	CUT	85	CUT	94	–	–	–	–	94
(United States)	Kevin Chappell	597	78	CUT	88	T35	83	–	–	–	–	83
(United States)	James Hahn	596	79	CUT	89	T35	84	–	–	–	–	84
(United States)	Tom Hoge*	594	80	CUT	90	T66	92	–	–	–	–	92
(United States)	Peter Uihlein*	593	81	T48	83	T12	64	T38	64	–	–	64
(South Africa)	Branden Grace	590	82	CUT	91	T43	88	–	–	–	–	88
(Mexico)	Abraham Ancer*	589	83	CUT	92	T7	56	T51	60	–	–	60
(Scotland)	Russell Knox	585	84	CUT	93	T43	89	–	–	–	–	89
(United States)	Kevin Tway	577	85	T56	86	T43	87	–	–	–	–	87
(United States)	Jamie Lovemark	576	86	T34	79	76	85	–	–	–	–	85
(United States)	Ollie Schniederjans	573	87	CUT	95	CUT	98	–	–	–	–	98
(United States)	Russell Henley	569	88	CUT	96	T58	96	–	–	–	–	96
(United States)	Daniel Berger	565	89	T15	63	T35	65	DNP	70	–	–	70
(United States)	Jason Dufner	557	90	CUT	100	CUT	100	–	–	–	–	100
(India)	Anirban Lahiri	555	91	T71	97	CUT	99	–	–	–	–	99
(England)	Tyrrell Hatton*	550	92	T20	71	T12	54	T29	54	–	–	54
(United States)	Patrick Rodgers	541	93	DNP	104	–	–	–	–	–	–	104
(United States)	Brandon Harkins*	528	94	T60	103	–	–	–	–	–	–	103
(United States)	Trey Mullinax*	528	95	T56	102	–	–	–	–	–	–	102
(South Africa)	Charl Schwartzel	528	96	CUT	105	–	–	–	–	–	–	105
(South Africa)	Rory Sabbatini	521	97	CUT	109	–	–	–	–	–	–	109
(United States)	Charley Hoffman	515	98	T20	75	74	79	–	–	–	–	79
(Germany)	Alex Čejka	502	99	T56	108	–	–	–	–	–	–	108
(United States)	Ryan Palmer	500	100	T5	50	CUT	58	T65	63	–	–	63
(United States)	Richy Werenski	498	101	CUT	110	–	–	–	–	–	–	110
(United States)	Nick Watney	491	102	T11	67	T62	74	–	–	–	–	74
(New Zealand)	Danny Lee	481	103	T34	98	T49	97	–	–	–	–	97
(South Korea)	Kang Sung-hoon	480	104	75	111	–	–	–	–	–	–	111
(United States)	John Huh	480	105	CUT	112	–	–	–	–	–	–	112
(United States)	Harold Varner III	474	106	T40	107	–	–	–	–	–	–	107
(United States)	Scott Stallings	470	107	T28	94	T49	93	–	–	–	–	93
(United States)	Tyler Duncan*	457	108	CUT	113	–	–	–	–	–	–	113
(United States)	William McGirt	449	109	CUT	116	–	–	–	–	–	–	116
(United States)	J. T. Poston*	448	110	CUT	117	–	–	–	–	–	–	117
(United States)	Bronson Burgoon*	446	111	T11	73	T58	78	–	–	–	–	78
(United States)	Vaughn Taylor	445	112	CUT	118	–	–	–	–	–	–	118
(Scotland)	Martin Laird	443	113	T73	115	–	–	–	–	–	–	115
(United States)	Sam Ryder*	442	114	T28	101	–	–	–	–	–	–	101
(United States)	Grayson Murray	438	115	WD	119	–	–	–	–	–	–	119
(United States)	Ryan Blaum	433	116	CUT	121	–	–	–	–	–	–	121
(United States)	Scott Brown	422	117	CUT	122	–	–	–	–	–	–	122
(United States)	Brian Stuard	421	118	T25	99	T31	86	–	–	–	–	86
(Canada)	Nick Taylor	420	119	CUT	123	–	–	–	–	–	–	123
(United States)	Sam Saunders*	420	120	T60	120	–	–	–	–	–	–	120
(United States)	Sean O'Hair	417	121	T28	106	–	–	–	–	–	–	106
(United States)	Bud Cauley	405	122	DNP	124	–	–	–	–	–	–	124
(Venezuela)	Jhonattan Vegas	394	123	T15	87	CUT	95	–	–	–	–	95
(United States)	Harris English	383	124	CUT	125	–	–	–	–	–	–	125
(Republic of Ireland)	Séamus Power*	377	125	T34	114	–	–	–	–	–	–	114

* First-time Playoffs participant
