= Peter Malnati =

American professional golfer (born 1987)

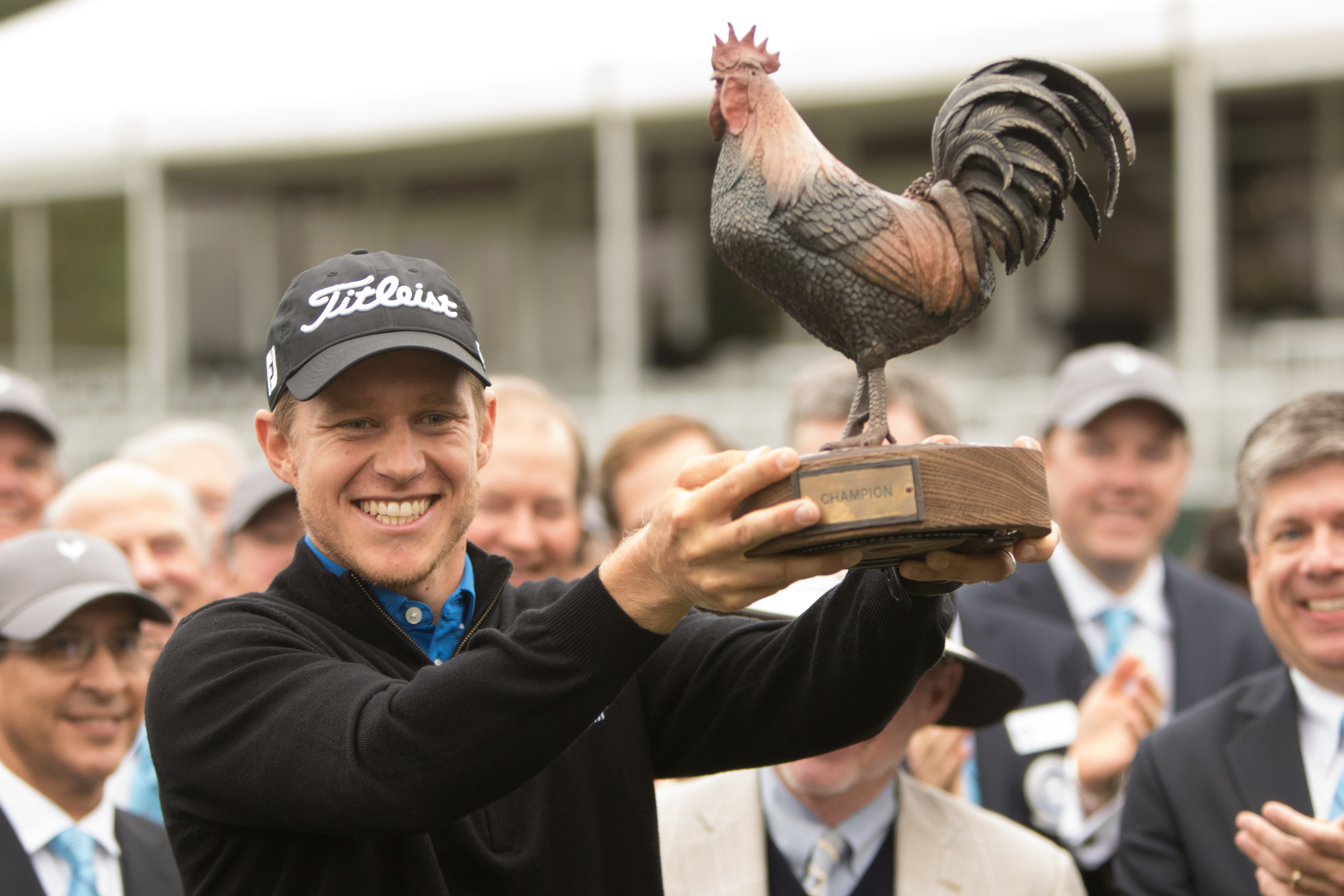
- Malnati after winning the 2015 Sanderson Farms Championship

Personal information
- Full name: Peter Joseph Malnati
- Nickname: Peppy Peter
- Nationality: United States
- Born: June 13, 1987 (age 39) New Castle, Indiana, U.S.
- Height: 5 ft 10 in (1.78 m)
- Weight: 160 lb (73 kg; 11 st)

Career
- Sport: Golf
- College: University of Missouri
- Turned professional: 2009
- Current tour: PGA Tour
- Former tours: Web.com Tour eGolf Professional Tour
- Professional wins: 8
- Highest ranking: 65 (March 24, 2024) (as of November 1, 2026)

Number of wins by tour
- PGA Tour: 2
- Korn Ferry Tour: 2
- Other: 4

Best results in major championships
- Masters Tournament: CUT: 2024
- PGA Championship: CUT: 2016, 2021, 2024
- U.S. Open: CUT: 2021, 2024
- The Open Championship: DNP

Peter Joseph Malnati (born June 13, 1987) is an American professional golfer who plays on the PGA Tour. His victories on the PGA Tour came at the 2015 Sanderson Farms Championship and the 2024 Valspar Championship. He previously played on the Korn Ferry Tour (then known as the Web.com Tour), where he is a two-time winner.

== Early years and amateur career ==
Malnati was born in New Castle, Indiana, and grew up in Dandridge, Tennessee, where he attended Jefferson County High School. He played college golf at the University of Missouri. He turned professional in 2009.

== Professional career ==
Malnati played on mini-tours until earning special temporary membership on the Web.com Tour (equivalent to 100th on the previous season's money list) in 2013. He won his seventh tournament of the 2013 season at the News Sentinel Open. He finished 18th on the 2013 Web.com Tour regular-season money list to earn his 2014 PGA Tour card.

In 2014, Malnati finished 178th in the FedEx Cup points list on the PGA Tour, thus losing his card, and failed to regain his card at the Web.com Tour Finals. He returned to the Web.com Tour for the 2015 season, earning his second win on the tour at the Brasil Champions en route to finishing fourth on the regular-season money list and regaining his PGA Tour card for the following season.

In November 2015, Malnati earned his maiden PGA Tour victory by winning the Sanderson Farms Championship by one stroke over William McGirt and David Toms after a Monday finish to the tournament. He shot a five-under round of 67 to come from one behind to take the victory over a crowded leaderboard. The win earned Malnati an exemption on the PGA Tour through the end of the 2018 season.

In March 2024, Malnati won the Valspar Championship for his first win since November 2015.

=== Yellow golf ball ===
He is one of the few PGA Tour players who uses a non-white golf ball. His choice of yellow is based on his son's affinity with a yellow golf ball at a young age.

== Amateur wins ==
- 2009 Tennessee Amateur

== Professional wins (8) ==
=== PGA Tour wins (2) ===
No.	Date	Tournament	Winning score	To par	Margin of victory	Runner(s)-up
1	Nov 9, 2015	Sanderson Farms Championship	69-66-68-67=270	−18	1 stroke	(United States) William McGirt, (United States) David Toms
2	Mar 24, 2024	Valspar Championship	66-71-68-67=272	−12	2 strokes	(United States) Cameron Young

=== Web.com Tour wins (2) ===
No.	Date	Tournament	Winning score	To par	Margin of victory	Runners-up
1	Aug 18, 2013	News Sentinel Open	70-67-66-65=268	−16	1 stroke	(United States) Blayne Barber, (United States) Matt Bettencourt, (Argentina) Miguel Ángel Carballo, (United States) James White
2	Mar 15, 2015	Brasil Champions	66-62-68-66=262	−22	4 strokes	(Mexico) Abraham Ancer, (United States) Matt Davidson, (United States) Tyler Duncan, (Argentina) Julián Etulain, (United States) Tim Madigan, (United States) John Mallinger, (Sweden) Henrik Norlander

Web.com Tour playoff record (0–1)

No.	Year	Tournament	Opponent	Result
1	2018	Nationwide Children's Hospital Championship	(United States) Robert Streb	Lost to par on first extra hole

=== eGolf Professional Tour wins (1) ===
No.	Date	Tournament	Winning score	To par	Margin of victory	Runner-up
1	Jun 30, 2012	The Championship at Wintergreen Resort	68-63-66-70=267	−21	1 stroke	(United States) Chesson Hadley

=== Other wins (3) ===
- 2008 Missouri Open (as an amateur)
- 2010 Nebraska Open
- 2011 Nebraska Open

== Results in major championships ==
Tournament	2016	2017	2018
Masters Tournament			
U.S. Open			
The Open Championship			
PGA Championship	CUT		

Tournament	2019	2020	2021	2022	2023	2024
Masters Tournament						CUT
PGA Championship			CUT			CUT
U.S. Open			CUT			CUT
The Open Championship		NT				

Did not play

CUT = missed the halfway cut
NT = no tournament due to COVID-19 pandemic

== Results in The Players Championship ==
Tournament	2016	2017	2018	2019
The Players Championship	CUT	CUT		

Tournament	2020	2021	2022	2023	2024	2025
The Players Championship	CUT	T46	CUT	T68	CUT	

Did not play

CUT = missed the halfway cut
"T" = Tied
C = Canceled after the first round due to the COVID-19 pandemic

== See also ==
- 2013 Web.com Tour Finals graduates
- 2015 Web.com Tour Finals graduates
- 2018 Web.com Tour Finals graduates
