= John Kimbell =

American golfer (born 1969)

Personal information
- Nationality: United States
- Born: January 3, 1969 (age 57) Atlanta, Georgia, U.S.
- Height: 5 ft 11 in (1.80 m)
- Weight: 210 lb (95 kg; 15 st)

Career
- Sport: Golf
- Turned professional: 1997
- Former tours: Nationwide Tour; NGA Hooters Tour
- Professional wins: 5

Number of wins by tour
- Korn Ferry Tour: 1
- Other: 4

John Kimbell (born January 3, 1969) is an American professional golfer.

Kimbell was born in Atlanta, Georgia. He did not start playing golf until the age of 22. He turned professional in 1997.

Kimbell played on mini-tours, winning three NGA Hooters Tour events and one Tight Lies Tour event. He has played on the Nationwide Tour since 2007. He has one win on Tour, the 2007 South Georgia Classic.

== Professional wins (5) ==
=== Nationwide Tour wins (1) ===
No.	Date	Tournament	Winning score	Margin of victory	Runner-up
1	Apr 15, 2007	South Georgia Classic	−10 (68-70-71-69=278)	1 stroke	(Australia) Matt Jones

=== NGA Hooters Tour wins (3) ===
No.	Date	Tournament	Winning score	Margin of victory	Runner(s)-up
1	Jul 25, 2004	American Signature Open	−19 (66-65-67-67=265)	1 stroke	(United States) John Carlson, (United States) Dave Schreyer
2	May 15, 2005	Indian Lakes Resort Classic	−16 (70-65-68-69=272)	5 strokes	(United States) Sal Spallone
3	Sep 24, 2006	Langdale Ford Championship	−6 (71-66-72-73=282)	Playoff	(United States) Justin Smith

=== Other wins (1) ===
- 2003 Audubon Imports Open (Tight Lies Tour)
