= Roger Sloan =

Canadian professional golfer

Personal information
- Full name: Roger Brandon Sloan
- Nationality: Canada
- Born: May 15, 1987 (age 39) Calgary, Alberta, Canada
- Height: 6 ft 2 in (1.88 m)
- Weight: 175 lb (79 kg; 12.5 st)

Career
- Sport: Golf
- College: University of Texas at El Paso
- Turned professional: 2009
- Current tour: PGA Tour
- Former tours: Korn Ferry Tour; Canadian Tour
- Professional wins: 3

Number of wins by tour
- Korn Ferry Tour: 2
- Other: 1

Best results in major championships
- Masters Tournament: DNP
- PGA Championship: DNP
- U.S. Open: CUT: 2022, 2023
- The Open Championship: DNP

Roger Brandon Sloan (born May 15, 1987) is a Canadian professional golfer.

== Early life and amateur career ==
Sloan was born in Calgary, Alberta and grew up in Merritt, British Columbia. He played college golf at the University of Texas at El Paso. Sloan graduated with a degree in finance.

== Professional career ==
Sloan played on the Canadian Tour shortly after turning professional. He won once in 2011. He played on the Web.com Tour in 2013 and 2014 and won his first title in July 2014 at the Nova Scotia Open. He finished 24th on the regular-season money list to earn his PGA Tour card for the 2014–15 season.

Sloan recorded his best finish on the PGA Tour at the 2021 Wyndham Championship. He lost in a six-man playoff after Kevin Kisner made a birdie putt on the second playoff hole.

== Professional wins (3) ==
=== Korn Ferry Tour wins (2) ===
No.	Date	Tournament	Winning score	To par	Margin of victory	Runner-up
1	Jul 6, 2014	Nova Scotia Open	67-65-71-70=273	−11	Playoff	(United States) Derek Fathauer
2	Aug 6, 2023	Utah Championship	66-65-63-66=260	−24	1 stroke	(United States) Chris Petefish

Korn Ferry Tour playoff record (1–0)

No.	Year	Tournament	Opponent	Result
1	2014	Nova Scotia Open	(United States) Derek Fathauer	Won with par on first extra hole

=== Canadian Tour wins (1) ===
No.	Date	Tournament	Winning score	To par	Margin of victory	Runner-up
1	Jun 12, 2011	Western Championship	64-70-65-66=265	−23	3 strokes	(Canada) Stuart Anderson

== Playoff record ==
PGA Tour playoff record (0–1)

No.	Year	Tournament	Opponents	Result
1	2021	Wyndham Championship	(South Africa) Branden Grace, (South Korea) Kim Si-woo, (United States) Kevin Kisner, (United States) Kevin Na, (Australia) Adam Scott	Kisner won with birdie on second extra hole

== Results in major championships ==
Tournament	2022	2023
Masters Tournament		
PGA Championship		
U.S. Open	CUT	CUT
The Open Championship		

Did not play

CUT = missed the half-way cut

== Results in The Players Championship ==
Tournament	2022
The Players Championship	CUT

CUT = missed the halfway cut

== See also ==
- 2014 Web.com Tour Finals graduates
- 2018 Web.com Tour Finals graduates
- 2023 Korn Ferry Tour graduates
