= 2012 WGC-Bridgestone Invitational =

Coordinates: 41.008°N 81.508°W

Tournament information
- Dates: August 2–5, 2012
- Location: Akron, Ohio, U.S.
- Course(s): Firestone Country Club; South Course
- Tour(s): PGA Tour; European Tour

Statistics
- Par: 70
- Length: 7,400 yards (6,767 m)
- Field: 78 players
- Cut: None
- Prize fund: $8,500,000 €6,770,017
- Winner's share: $1,400,000 €1,131,130

Champion
- (United States) Keegan Bradley
- 267 (−13)

Location in the United States
Location in Ohio

The 2012 WGC-Bridgestone Invitational was a professional golf tournament held August 2–5 on the South Course of Firestone Country Club in Akron, Ohio. It was the 14th WGC-Bridgestone Invitational tournament, and the third of four World Golf Championships events held in 2012. Keegan Bradley shot a 64 (−6) in the final round to finish with 267 (−13) to win his first WGC event, one stroke ahead of runners-up Jim Furyk and Steve Stricker.

== Venue ==
=== Course layout ===
The South Course was designed by Bert Way and redesigned by Robert Trent Jones in 1960.

Hole	1	2	3	4	5	6	7	8	9	Out	10	11	12	13	14	15	16	17	18	In	Total
Yards	399	526	442	471	200	469	219	482	494	3702	410	418	180	471	467	221	667	400	464	3698	7400
Par	4	5	4	4	3	4	3	4	4	35	4	4	3	4	4	3	5	4	4	35	70

== Field ==
The field consisted of players drawn primarily from the Official World Golf Ranking and the winners of the world-wide tournaments with the strongest fields.

1. Playing members of the 2011 United States and International Presidents Cup teams.
Robert Allenby, Aaron Baddeley, K. J. Choi (2,3), Jason Day (2,3), Ernie Els (2,3,4), Jim Furyk (2,3), Retief Goosen, Bill Haas (2,3,4), Ryo Ishikawa, Dustin Johnson (2,3,4), Matt Kuchar (2,3,4), Kim Kyung-tae, Hunter Mahan (2,3,4), Phil Mickelson (2,3,4), Geoff Ogilvy (2,3), Charl Schwartzel (2,3), Adam Scott (2,3,4), Steve Stricker (2,3,4), David Toms (2,3), Nick Watney (2,3), Bubba Watson (2,3,4), Tiger Woods (2,3,4), Y. E. Yang

- Webb Simpson (2,3,4) did not compete for personal reasons.

2. The top 50 players from the Official World Golf Ranking as of July 23, 2012.
Bae Sang-moon (3), Thomas Bjørn (3,4), Keegan Bradley (3,4), Jonathan Byrd (3), Rafa Cabrera-Bello (3,4), Nicolas Colsaerts (3,4), Luke Donald (3,4), Jason Dufner (3,4), Simon Dyson (3,4), Gonzalo Fernández-Castaño (3,4), Rickie Fowler (3,4), Sergio García (3,4), Peter Hanson (3), Freddie Jacobson (3), Zach Johnson (3,4), Martin Kaymer (3,4), Martin Laird (3), Paul Lawrie (3,4), Graeme McDowell (3), Rory McIlroy (3,4), Francesco Molinari (3,4), Kevin Na (3), Louis Oosthuizen (3,4), Carl Pettersson (3,4), Ian Poulter (3,5), Álvaro Quirós (3,4), Justin Rose (3,4), John Senden (3), Brandt Snedeker (3,4), Bo Van Pelt (3), Lee Westwood (3,5), Mark Wilson (3,4)

3. The top 50 players from the Official World Golf Ranking as of July 30, 2012.

4. Tournament winners of worldwide events since the prior year's tournament with an Official World Golf Ranking Strength of Field Rating of 115 points or more.
Greg Chalmers, Ben Crane, Jamie Donaldson, Branden Grace, Michael Hoey, Thongchai Jaidee, Marc Leishman, Tom Lewis, Joost Luiten, Toshinori Muto, Scott Piercy, Ted Potter Jr., Robert Rock, Marcel Siem, Jeev Milkha Singh, Lee Slattery, Kyle Stanley, Johnson Wagner, Bernd Wiesberger, Danny Willett

5. The winner of selected tournaments from each of the following tours:

- Asian Tour: Thailand Golf Championship (2011) – Lee Westwood, also qualified in categories 2 and 3
- PGA Tour of Australasia: JBWere Masters (2011) – Ian Poulter, also qualified in categories 2 and 3
- Japan Golf Tour: Bridgestone Open (2011) – Toru Taniguchi
- Japan Golf Tour: Japan Golf Tour Championship (2012) – Yoshinori Fujimoto
- Sunshine Tour: Dimension Data Pro-Am (2012) – Oliver Bekker

Nine of the field were appearing in their first WGC event: Oliver Bekker, Jamie Donaldson, Yoshinori Fujimoto, Joost Luiten, Toshinori Muto, Scott Piercy, Ted Potter Jr., Marcel Siem and Bernd Wiesberger.

== Round summaries ==
=== First round ===
Thursday, August 2, 2012

Place	Player	Score	To par
1	(United States) Jim Furyk	63	−7
2	(England) Lee Slattery	65	−5
T3	(Spain) Rafa Cabrera-Bello	66	−4
T3	(United States) Ben Crane	66	−4
T3	(England) Luke Donald	66	−4
T3	(England) Simon Dyson	66	−4
T3	(Australia) John Senden	66	−4
T3	(United States) Bubba Watson	66	−4
T9	(United States) Keegan Bradley	67	−3
T9	(United States) Jason Dufner	67	−3
T9	(Spain) Sergio García	67	−3
T9	(South Africa) Retief Goosen	67	−3
T9	(United States) Bill Haas	67	−3
T9	(South Korea) Kim Kyung-tae	67	−3
T9	(Australia) Geoff Ogilvy	67	−3
T9	(South Africa) Louis Oosthuizen	67	−3
T9	(Sweden) Carl Pettersson	67	−3

=== Second round ===
Friday, August 3, 2012

Place	Player	Score	To par
1	(United States) Jim Furyk	63-66=129	−11
2	(Spain) Rafa Cabrera-Bello	66-65=131	−9
3	(South Africa) Louis Oosthuizen	67-65=132	−8
4	(United States) Jason Dufner	67-66=133	−7
5	(South Korea) Kim Kyung-tae	67-67=134	−6
T6	(England) Luke Donald	66-69=135	−5
T6	(United States) David Toms	68-67=135	−5
T8	(United States) Keegan Bradley	67-69=136	−4
T8	(Australia) John Senden	66-70=136	−4
T8	(England) Lee Slattery	65-71=136	−4
T8	(United States) Steve Stricker	68-68=136	−4

=== Third round ===
Saturday, August 4, 2012

Place	Player	Score	To par
1	(United States) Jim Furyk	63-66-70=199	−11
2	(South Africa) Louis Oosthuizen	67-65-68=200	−10
3	(United States) Keegan Bradley	67-69-67=203	−7
T4	(Northern Ireland) Rory McIlroy	70-67-67=204	−6
T4	(United States) Steve Stricker	68-68-68=204	−6
T6	(England) Justin Rose	70-69-66=205	−5
T6	(Australia) John Senden	66-70-69=205	−5
T6	(United States) Bo Van Pelt	70-69-66=205	−5
T9	(England) Luke Donald	66-69-71=206	−4
T9	(United States) Jason Dufner	67-66-73=206	−4

=== Final round ===
Sunday, August 5, 2012

Place	Player	Score	To par	Money ($)
1	(United States) Keegan Bradley	67-69-67-64=267	−13	1,400,000
T2	(United States) Jim Furyk	63-66-70-69=268	−12	665,000
T2	(United States) Steve Stricker	68-68-68-64=268	−12	665,000
4	(South Africa) Louis Oosthuizen	67-65-68-69=269	−11	365,000
T5	(Northern Ireland) Rory McIlroy	70-67-67-68=272	−8	276,500
T5	(England) Justin Rose	70-69-66-67=272	−8	276,500
7	(United States) Jason Dufner	67-66-73-68=274	−6	210,000
T8	(Australia) Aaron Baddeley	73-66-71-66=276	−4	128,750
T8	(South Korea) K. J. Choi	71-72-67-66=276	−4	128,750
T8	(England) Luke Donald	66-69-71-70=276	−4	128,750
T8	(United States) Matt Kuchar	70-70-70-66=276	−4	128,750
T8	(England) Lee Slattery	65-71-72-68=276	−4	128,750
T8	(United States) David Toms	68-67-73-68=276	−4	128,750
T8	(United States) Bo Van Pelt	70-69-66-71=276	−4	128,750
T8	(United States) Tiger Woods	70-72-68-66=276	−4	128,750

==== Scorecard ====
Final round

Hole	1	2	3	4	5	6	7	8	9	10	11	12	13	14	15	16	17	18
Par	4	5	4	4	3	4	3	4	4	4	4	3	4	4	3	5	4	4
(United States) Bradley	−7	−7	−8	−8	−8	−8	−9	−9	−9	−10	−11	−11	−11	−12	−12	−13	−13	−13
(United States) Furyk	−12	−13	−14	−14	−14	−13	−13	−13	−13	−13	−13	−13	−13	−13	−13	−14	−14	−12
(United States) Stricker	−6	−6	−6	−6	−7	−7	−7	−8	−8	−8	−8	−8	−8	−9	−9	−10	−11	−12
(South Africa) Oosthuizen	−11	−12	−12	−12	−11	−11	−11	−11	−10	−9	−9	−10	−10	−10	−10	−11	−11	−11
(Northern Ireland) McIlroy	−6	−7	−8	−8	−8	−8	−8	−8	−7	−7	−7	−7	−7	−7	−8	−8	−8	−8
(England) Rose	−5	−6	−7	−7	−7	−7	−7	−7	−7	−6	−6	−7	−7	−7	−7	−8	−8	−8

Cumulative tournament scores, relative to par

Birdie	Bogey	Double bogey
