= Nova Scotia Open =

Golf tournament on the Web.com Tour

Tournament information
- Location: Halifax, Nova Scotia, Canada
- Established: 2014
- Courses: Ashburn Golf Club (New Course)
- Par: 71
- Length: 7,014 yards (6,414 m)
- Tour: Web.com Tour
- Format: Stroke play
- Prize fund: US$650,000
- Month played: July
- Final year: 2015

Tournament record score
- Aggregate: 271 Abraham Ancer (2015); 271 Bronson Burgoon (2015)
- To par: −13 as above

Final champion
- (Mexico) Abraham Ancer
- Location in Canada Location in Nova Scotia

The Nova Scotia Open was a golf tournament on the Web.com Tour. It was first played in July 2014 at the Ashburn Golf Club, New Course in Halifax, Nova Scotia.

== Winners ==
Year	Winner	Score	To par	Margin of victory	Runner-up
2015	(Mexico) Abraham Ancer	271	−13	Playoff	(United States) Bronson Burgoon
2014	(Canada) Roger Sloan	273	−11	Playoff	(United States) Derek Fathauer
