= 2014 Web.com Tour =

Golf tour season

2014 Web.com Tour season
- Duration: February 12, 2014 – September 21, 2014
- Number of official events: 25
- Most wins: (Mexico) Carlos Ortiz (3)
- Regular season money list: (Mexico) Carlos Ortiz
- Finals money list: (United States) Derek Fathauer
- Player of the Year: (Mexico) Carlos Ortiz

The 2014 Web.com Tour was the 25th season of the Web.com Tour, the official development tour to the PGA Tour.

== Schedule ==
The following table lists official events during the 2014 season.

| Date | Tournament | Location | Purse (US$) | Winner (Note: The number in parentheses after each winner's name is the number of Web.com Tour events they had won up to and including that tournament. This information is only shown for Web.com Tour members. It is rare for someone to accumulate many wins on the Web.com Tour as success at this level usually leads to promotion to the PGA Tour.) | OWGR points | Notes |
|---|---|---|---|---|---|---|
| Feb 16 | Pacific Rubiales Colombia Championship | Colombia | 750,000 | (Germany) Alex Čejka (1) | 14 | |
| Mar 9 | Chile Classic | Chile | 650,000 | (Canada) Adam Hadwin (1) | 14 | |
| Mar 16 | Brasil Champions | Brazil | 800,000 | (United States) Jon Curran (1) | 14 | |
| Mar 23 | Panama Claro Championship | Panama | 625,000 | (Mexico) Carlos Ortiz (1) | 14 | |
| Mar 30 | Chitimacha Louisiana Open | Louisiana | 550,000 | (United States) Kris Blanks (2) | 14 | |
| Apr 13 | El Bosque Mexico Championship | Mexico | 700,000 | (Mexico) Carlos Ortiz (2) | 14 | |
| Apr 27 | WNB Golf Classic | Texas | 600,000 | (United States) Andrew Putnam (1) | 14 | |
| May 4 | South Georgia Classic | Georgia | 650,000 | (United States) Blayne Barber (1) | 14 | |
| May 18 | BMW Charity Pro-Am | South Carolina | 650,000 | (United States) Max Homa (1) | 14 | Pro-Am |
| May 25 | Rex Hospital Open | North Carolina | 625,000 | (United States) Byron Smith (1) | 14 | |
| Jun 8 | Cleveland Open | Ohio | 600,000 | (New Zealand) Steven Alker (4) | 14 | New tournament |
| Jun 22 | Air Capital Classic | Kansas | 600,000 | (Denmark) Sebastian Cappelen (1) | 14 | |
| Jun 29 | United Leasing Championship | Indiana | 600,000 | (England) Greg Owen (1) | 14 | |
| Jul 6 | Nova Scotia Open | Canada | 650,000 | (Canada) Roger Sloan (1) | 14 | New tournament |
| Jul 13 | Utah Championship | Utah | 625,000 | (United States) Andres Gonzales (2) | 14 | |
| Jul 20 | Albertsons Boise Open | Idaho | 800,000 | (United States) Steve Wheatcroft (2) | 14 | |
| Jul 27 | Midwest Classic | Kansas | 600,000 | (United States) Zack Sucher (1) | 14 | |
| Aug 3 | Stonebrae Classic | California | 600,000 | (United States) Tony Finau (1) | 14 | |
| Aug 10 | Price Cutter Charity Championship | Missouri | 675,000 | (Australia) Cameron Percy (1) | 14 | |
| Aug 17 | News Sentinel Open | Tennessee | 550,000 | (United States) Martin Piller (3) | 14 | |
| Aug 24 | WinCo Foods Portland Open | Oregon | 800,000 | (Mexico) Carlos Ortiz (3) (Note: Ortiz earned immediate promotion to the PGA Tour, as this was his third win of the season.) | 14 | New tournament |
| Aug 31 | Hotel Fitness Championship | Indiana | 1,000,000 | (United States) Bud Cauley (1) | 16 | Finals event |
| Sep 7 | Chiquita Classic | North Carolina | 1,000,000 | (Canada) Adam Hadwin (2) | 16 | Finals event |
| Sep 14 | Nationwide Children's Hospital Championship | Ohio | 1,000,000 | (United States) Justin Thomas (1) | 16 | Finals event |
| Sep 21 | Web.com Tour Championship | Florida | 1,000,000 | (United States) Derek Fathauer (1) | 20 | Finals event |

== Location of tournaments ==
Location of tournaments of the 2014 Web.com Tour in the United States and Canada.
Regular-season events
Regular-season finale
Finals events
Location of tournaments of the 2014 Web.com Tour outside the United States and Canada.

== Money list ==
=== Regular season money list ===
The regular season money list was based on prize money won during the season, calculated in U.S. dollars. The top 25 players on the regular season money list earned status to play on the 2014–15 PGA Tour.

| Position | Player | Prize money ($) |
|---|---|---|
| 1 | (Mexico) Carlos Ortiz | 515,403 |
| 2 | (United States) Andrew Putnam | 320,438 |
| 3 | (United States) Zack Sucher | 294,166 |
| 4 | (Canada) Adam Hadwin | 293,667 |
| 5 | (United States) Justin Thomas | 276,637 |

=== Finals money list ===
The Finals money list was based on prize money won during the Web.com Tour Finals, calculated in U.S. dollars. The top 25 players on the Finals money list (not otherwise exempt) earned status to play on the 2014–15 PGA Tour.

| Position | Player | Prize money ($) |
|---|---|---|
| 1 | (United States) Derek Fathauer | 250,133 |
| 2 | (Canada) Adam Hadwin | 236,125 |
| 3 | (United States) Justin Thomas | 204,633 |
| 4 | (United States) Bud Cauley | 180,000 |
| 5 | (United States) Colt Knost | 154,000 |

== Awards ==
| Award | Winner | Ref. |
|---|---|---|
| Player of the Year (Jack Nicklaus Trophy) | (Mexico) Carlos Ortiz | |
