= South Georgia Classic =

Tournament information
- Location: Valdosta, Georgia
- Established: 2007
- Course: Kinderlou Forest Golf Club
- Par: 72
- Length: 7,781 yards (7,115 m)
- Tour: Web.com Tour
- Format: Stroke play
- Prize fund: US$650,000
- Month played: April
- Final year: 2014

Tournament record score
- Aggregate: 272 Ted Potter Jr. (2011); 272 Luke List (2012)
- To par: −16 as above

Final champion
- (United States) Blayne Barber
- Location in the United States Location in Georgia

The South Georgia Classic was a golf tournament on the Web.com Tour from 2007 to 2014. It was played at Kinderlou Forest Golf Club in Valdosta, Georgia, United States.

The 2014 purse was $650,000, with $117,000 going to the winner.

== Winners ==
Year	Winner	Score	To par	Margin of victory	Runner(s)-up
2014	(United States) Blayne Barber	273	−15	2 strokes	(United States) Alex Prugh
2013	(United States) Will Wilcox	273	−15	4 strokes	(United States) D. J. Brigman (United States) Michael Putnam (United States) Zack Sucher
2012	(United States) Luke List	272	−16	2 strokes	(United States) Brian Stuard
2011	(United States) Ted Potter Jr.	272	−16	3 strokes	(Australia) Mathew Goggin
2010	(Australia) Ewan Porter	277	−11	1 stroke	(Venezuela) Jhonattan Vegas
2009	(South Africa) Garth Mulroy	275	−13	1 stroke	(United States) Chris Tidland
2008	(Canada) Bryan DeCorso	274	−14	4 strokes	(United States) Bryce Molder (England) Greg Owen
2007	(United States) John Kimbell	278	−10	1 stroke	(Australia) Matt Jones
