= 2021 WGC-FedEx St. Jude Invitational =

Tournament information
- Dates: August 5–8, 2021
- Location: Memphis, Tennessee, U.S. 35.057°N 89.779°W
- Course: TPC Southwind
- Tours: PGA Tour; European Tour

Statistics
- Par: 70
- Length: 7,244 yards (6,624 m)
- Field: 66
- Cut: None
- Prize fund: US$10,250,000
- Winner's share: US$1,820,000

Champion
- (Mexico) Abraham Ancer
- 264 (−16)
- Location in the United States Location in Tennessee

The 2021 WGC-FedEx St. Jude Invitational was a professional golf tournament being held August 5–8 at TPC Southwind in Memphis, Tennessee. It was the 23rd and final WGC Invitational tournament, the third of the World Golf Championships events in 2021. It was also the 64th year that the PGA Tour stopped in Memphis; dating back to the 1958 Memphis Open. The WGC Invitational was removed from the schedule in 2022, with the venue of the tournament hosting the FedEx St. Jude Championship, a FedEx Cup playoff event, ultimately replacing The Northern Trust.

Abraham Ancer won the event after making a birdie at the second hole of a sudden-death playoff against Sam Burns and Hideki Matsuyama. The three had tied at 264 after 72 holes, 16-under-par, a stroke ahead of Harris English, the first, second and third round leader.

== Venue ==
=== Course layout ===
TPC Southwind was designed by Ron Prichard, in consultation with tour pros Hubert Green and Fuzzy Zoeller. TPC Southwind opened in 1988, and is a member of the Tournament Players Club network operated by the PGA Tour.

| Hole | Yards | Par | Hole | Yards | Par |
|---|---|---|---|---|---|
| 1 | 434 | 4 | 10 | 465 | 4 |
| 2 | 401 | 4 | 11 | 162 | 3 |
| 3 | 554 | 5 | 12 | 406 | 4 |
| 4 | 196 | 3 | 13 | 472 | 4 |
| 5 | 485 | 4 | 14 | 239 | 3 |
| 6 | 445 | 4 | 15 | 395 | 4 |
| 7 | 482 | 4 | 16 | 530 | 5 |
| 8 | 178 | 3 | 17 | 490 | 4 |
| 9 | 457 | 4 | 18 | 453 | 4 |
| Out | 3,632 | 35 | In | 3,612 | 35 |
| Source: | | Total | | 7,244 | 70 |

== Field ==
The field consists of players drawn primarily from the Official World Golf Ranking and the winners of the worldwide tournaments with the strongest fields.

1. The top 50 players from the Official World Golf Ranking as of July 26, 2021.

- Abraham Ancer (2)
- Daniel Berger (2,3)
- Sam Burns (2,3)
- Patrick Cantlay (2,3)
- Paul Casey (2,3)
- Stewart Cink (2,3)
- Corey Conners (2)
- Bryson DeChambeau (2,3)
- Harris English (2,3)
- Tony Finau (2)
- Matt Fitzpatrick (2,3)
- Tommy Fleetwood (2)
- Brian Harman (2)
- Tyrrell Hatton (2,3)
- Garrick Higgo (2,3)
- Max Homa (2,3)
- Billy Horschel (2,3)
- Viktor Hovland (2,3)
- Im Sung-jae (2)
- Dustin Johnson (2,3)
- Kevin Kisner (2)
- Brooks Koepka (2,3)
- Jason Kokrak (2,3)
- Marc Leishman (2)
- Shane Lowry (2)
- Robert MacIntyre (2)
- Hideki Matsuyama (2,3)
- Rory McIlroy (2,3)
- Phil Mickelson (2,3)
- Collin Morikawa (2,3)
- Kevin Na (2,3)
- Joaquín Niemann (2)
- Louis Oosthuizen (2)
- Ryan Palmer (2)
- Victor Perez (2)
- Ian Poulter
- Patrick Reed (2,3)
- Justin Rose (2)
- Xander Schauffele (2,3)
- Scottie Scheffler (2)
- Adam Scott (2)
- Webb Simpson (2)
- Cameron Smith (2)
- Jordan Spieth (2,3)
- Justin Thomas (2,3)
- Lee Westwood (2)
- Matthew Wolff (2)
- Will Zalatoris (2)
- Jon Rahm (2,3) did not play.
- Christiaan Bezuidenhout (2) did not play. (Note: Bezuidenhout was ineligible to compete as he had already played in 12 tournaments on the 2020–21 PGA Tour, the maximum allowed for non-members who have not qualified for Special Temporary Membership on that tour.)

2. The top 50 players from the Official World Golf Ranking as of August 2, 2021.

- Lucas Herbert (3)

3. Tournament winners, whose victories are considered official, of tournaments from the Federation Tours since the prior season's WGC Invitational with an Official World Golf Ranking Strength of Field Rating of 115 points or more. (Note: The "Strength of Field Rating" is a measure of the combined world ranking of players in the field. It is used by the Official World Golf Ranking to determine the number of ranking points available at each tournament, subject to tour minimums.)

- Cameron Champ
- Cameron Davis
- Sergio García
- Lucas Glover
- Jim Herman
- Matt Jones
- Kim Si-woo
- Martin Laird
- Lee Kyoung-hoon
- Min Woo Lee
- Carlos Ortiz
- Aaron Rai
- Robert Streb

4. The winner of selected tournaments or leaders in tour Order of Merit

- Asian Tour: 2020–21 Order of Merit leader – Wade Ormsby
- PGA Tour of Australasia: 2020–21 Order of Merit winner – Brad Kennedy
- Japan Golf Tour: Bridgestone Open (2020) – Canceled
- Japan Golf Tour: Japan Golf Tour Championship (2021) – Ryosuke Kinoshita
- Sunshine Tour: Dimension Data Pro-Am (2021) – Wilco Nienaber

== Round summaries ==
=== First round ===
Thursday, August 5, 2021

| Place | Player | Score | To par |
|---|---|---|---|
| 1 | (United States) Harris English | 62 | −8 |
| T2 | (United States) Jim Herman | 64 | −6 |
| T2 | (Mexico) Carlos Ortiz | 64 | −6 |
| T2 | (England) Ian Poulter | 64 | −6 |
| T2 | (United States) Matthew Wolff | 64 | −6 |
| T6 | (United States) Bryson DeChambeau | 65 | −5 |
| T6 | (United States) Marc Leishman | 65 | −5 |
| T6 | (United States) Scottie Scheffler | 65 | −5 |
| T9 | (United States) Daniel Berger | 66 | −4 |
| T9 | (United States) Sam Burns | 66 | −4 |
| T9 | (United States) Max Homa | 66 | −4 |
| T9 | (United States) Will Zalatoris | 66 | −4 |

=== Second round ===
Friday, August 6, 2021

| Place | Player | Score | To par |
|---|---|---|---|
| 1 | (United States) Harris English | 62-65=127 | −13 |
| T2 | (Mexico) Abraham Ancer | 67-62=129 | −11 |
| T2 | (Australia) Cameron Smith | 67-62=129 | −11 |
| T4 | (United States) Sam Burns | 66-64=130 | −10 |
| T4 | (England) Ian Poulter | 64-66=130 | −10 |
| T4 | (United States) Scottie Scheffler | 65-65=130 | −10 |
| T7 | (United States) Bryson DeChambeau | 65-66=131 | −9 |
| T7 | (South Africa) Louis Oosthuizen | 67-64=131 | −9 |
| T9 | (United States) Jim Herman | 64-68=132 | −8 |
| T9 | (United States) Will Zalatoris | 66-66=132 | −8 |

=== Third round ===
Saturday, August 7, 2021

| Place | Player | Score | To par |
|---|---|---|---|
| 1 | (United States) Harris English | 62-65-65=192 | −18 |
| T2 | (United States) Bryson DeChambeau | 65-66-63=194 | −16 |
| T2 | (Australia) Cameron Smith | 67-62-65=194 | −16 |
| 4 | (Mexico) Abraham Ancer | 67-62-67=196 | −14 |
| T5 | (England) Ian Poulter | 64-66-67=197 | −13 |
| T5 | (United States) Scottie Scheffler | 65-65-67=197 | −13 |
| T7 | (England) Paul Casey | 68-66-65=199 | −11 |
| T7 | (United States) Dustin Johnson | 69-65-65=199 | −11 |
| T7 | (South Africa) Louis Oosthuizen | 67-64-68=199 | −11 |
| T7 | (United States) Will Zalatoris | 66-66-67=199 | −11 |

=== Final round ===
Sunday, August 8, 2021

==== Final leaderboard ====
Champion
(c) = past champion

| Place | Player | Score | To par | Money ($) |
|---|---|---|---|---|
| T1 | (Mexico) Abraham Ancer | 67-62-67-68=264 | −16 | Playoff |
| T1 | (United States) Sam Burns | 66-64-70-64=264 | −16 | Playoff |
| T1 | (Japan) Hideki Matsuyama (c) | 68-69-64-63=264 | −16 | Playoff |
| 4 | (United States) Harris English | 62-65-65-73=265 | −15 | 515,000 |
| T5 | (United States) Daniel Berger | 66-67-67-66=266 | −14 | 380,667 |
| T5 | (England) Paul Casey | 68-66-65-67=266 | −14 | 380,667 |
| T5 | (Australia) Cameron Smith | 67-62-65-72=266 | −14 | 380,667 |
| T8 | (United States) Bryson DeChambeau | 65-66-63-74=268 | −12 | 272,500 |
| T8 | (United States) Will Zalatoris | 66-66-67-69=268 | −12 | 272,500 |
| T10 | (United States) Dustin Johnson (c) | 69-65-65-70=269 | −11 | 220,000 |
| T10 | (England) Ian Poulter | 64-66-67-72=269 | −11 | 220,000 |

Leaderboard below the top 10
| Place | Player | Score | To par | Money ($) |
|---|---|---|---|---|
| T12 | (Northern Ireland) Rory McIlroy (c) | 72-66-66-66=270 | −10 | 186,500 |
| T12 | (United States) Jordan Spieth | 71-69-63-67=270 | −10 | 186,500 |
| 14 | (United States) Scottie Scheffler | 65-65-67-74=271 | −9 | 170,000 |
| T15 | (Scotland) Robert MacIntyre | 69-67-68-68=272 | −8 | 155,500 |
| T15 | (United States) Webb Simpson | 71-65-72-64=272 | −8 | 155,500 |
| T17 | (England) Tyrrell Hatton | 67-68-65-73=273 | −7 | 128,000 |
| T17 | (United States) Billy Horschel | 68-67-66-72=273 | −7 | 128,000 |
| T17 | (United States) Phil Mickelson | 69-66-70-68=273 | −7 | 128,000 |
| T17 | (Chile) Joaquín Niemann | 70-68-68-67=273 | −7 | 128,000 |
| T17 | (South Africa) Louis Oosthuizen | 67-64-68-74=273 | −7 | 128,000 |
| T17 | (United States) Matthew Wolff | 64-70-72-67=273 | −7 | 128,000 |
| T23 | (United States) Patrick Cantlay | 71-67-69-67=274 | −6 | 105,000 |
| T23 | (Republic of Ireland) Shane Lowry (c) | 68-69-67-70=274 | −6 | 105,000 |
| T23 | (United States) Kevin Na | 67-71-67-69=274 | −6 | 105,000 |
| T26 | (Spain) Sergio García | 70-68-65-72=275 | −5 | 89,000 |
| T26 | (United States) Collin Morikawa | 67-71-68-69=275 | −5 | 89,000 |
| T26 | (United States) Ryan Palmer | 70-64-68-73=275 | −5 | 89,000 |
| T26 | (England) Aaron Rai | 70-67-71-67=275 | −5 | 89,000 |
| T26 | (United States) Justin Thomas (c) | 67-67-69-72=275 | −5 | 89,000 |
| T31 | (United States) Cameron Champ | 71-72-65-68=276 | −4 | 77,000 |
| T31 | (United States) Patrick Reed | 68-69-69-70=276 | −4 | 77,000 |
| T31 | (England) Lee Westwood | 67-69-69-71=276 | −4 | 77,000 |
| T34 | (United States) Tony Finau | 69-65-69-74=277 | −3 | 69,500 |
| T34 | (United States) Jason Kokrak | 67-68-68-74=277 | −3 | 69,500 |
| T36 | (Canada) Corey Conners | 67-69-69-73=278 | −2 | 59,000 |
| T36 | (United States) Brian Harman | 70-69-69-70=278 | −2 | 59,000 |
| T36 | (Australia) Lucas Herbert | 69-70-70-69=278 | −2 | 59,000 |
| T36 | (Norway) Viktor Hovland | 73-65-69-71=278 | −2 | 59,000 |
| T36 | (Australia) Marc Leishman | 65-71-69-73=278 | −2 | 59,000 |
| T36 | (Mexico) Carlos Ortiz | 64-69-73-72=278 | −2 | 59,000 |
| T36 | (Australia) Adam Scott (c) | 74-66-70-68=278 | −2 | 59,000 |
| T43 | (United States) Stewart Cink (c) | 68-66-74-71=279 | −1 | 53,000 |
| T43 | (Australia) Brad Kennedy | 67-70-70-72=279 | −1 | 53,000 |
| T43 | (Japan) Ryosuke Kinoshita | 74-66-70-69=279 | −1 | 53,000 |
| T46 | (England) Tommy Fleetwood | 69-70-69-72=280 | E | 49,000 |
| T46 | (United States) Jim Herman | 64-68-73-75=280 | E | 49,000 |
| T46 | (South Korea) Im Sung-jae | 70-70-67-73=280 | E | 49,000 |
| T46 | (United States) Xander Schauffele | 69-73-70-68=280 | E | 49,000 |
| T46 | (United States) Robert Streb | 71-66-71-72=280 | E | 49,000 |
| T51 | (United States) Max Homa | 66-68-74-73=281 | +1 | 45,000 |
| T51 | (Australia) Matt Jones | 69-68-74-70=281 | +1 | 45,000 |
| T51 | (Australia) Wade Ormsby | 69-71-68-73=281 | +1 | 45,000 |
| T54 | (United States) Brooks Koepka (c) | 70-69-67-76=282 | +2 | 42,000 |
| T54 | (South Korea) Lee Kyoung-hoon | 68-74-70-70=282 | +2 | 42,000 |
| T54 | (England) Justin Rose | 69-69-69-75=282 | +2 | 42,000 |
| T57 | (England) Matt Fitzpatrick | 70-72-67-74=283 | +3 | 39,167 |
| T57 | (United States) Lucas Glover | 71-73-66-73=283 | +3 | 39,167 |
| T57 | (Scotland) Martin Laird | 68-69-69-77=283 | +3 | 39,167 |
| 60 | (Australia) Cameron Davis | 68-72-73-72=285 | +5 | 38,000 |
| 61 | (France) Victor Perez | 71-69-71-76=287 | +7 | 37,500 |
| 62 | (Australia) Min Woo Lee | 67-75-74-72=288 | +8 | 37,000 |
| 63 | (United States) Kevin Kisner | 67-72-71-79=289 | +9 | 36,500 |
| 64 | (South Africa) Wilco Nienaber | 76-72-72-70=290 | +10 | 36,000 |
| 65 | (South Korea) Kim Si-woo | 70-70-75-78=293 | +13 | 35,500 |
| WD | (South Africa) Garrick Higgo | 68-70-67=205 | −5 | |

==== Scorecard ====
| Hole | 1 | 2 | 3 | 4 | 5 | 6 | 7 | 8 | 9 | 10 | 11 | 12 | 13 | 14 | 15 | 16 | 17 | 18 |
|---|---|---|---|---|---|---|---|---|---|---|---|---|---|---|---|---|---|---|
| Par | 4 | 4 | 5 | 3 | 4 | 4 | 4 | 3 | 4 | 4 | 3 | 4 | 4 | 3 | 4 | 5 | 4 | 4 |
| (Mexico) Ancer | −14 | −15 | −16 | −16 | −16 | −15 | −15 | −15 | −15 | −15 | −15 | −15 | −16 | −16 | −16 | −16 | −16 | −16 |
| (United States) Burns | −10 | −11 | −11 | −11 | −12 | −13 | −13 | −13 | −14 | −15 | −15 | −15 | −13 | −13 | −14 | −15 | −15 | −16 |
| (Japan) Matsuyama | −9 | −9 | −10 | −10 | −10 | −10 | −10 | −11 | −12 | −12 | −12 | −13 | −14 | −15 | −15 | −16 | −16 | −16 |
| (United States) English | −17 | −17 | −18 | −18 | −18 | −19 | −19 | −20 | −20 | −20 | −18 | −18 | −18 | −16 | −16 | −15 | −15 | −15 |
| (United States) Berger | −10 | −11 | −12 | −12 | −12 | −12 | −12 | −12 | −13 | −13 | −13 | −14 | −14 | −13 | −12 | −12 | −13 | −14 |
| (England) Casey | −12 | −12 | −12 | −12 | −12 | −13 | −12 | −12 | −12 | −11 | −11 | −11 | −12 | −13 | −13 | −14 | −14 | −14 |
| (Australia) Smith | −16 | −17 | −17 | −17 | −17 | −17 | −18 | −17 | −16 | −16 | −15 | −16 | −16 | −17 | −16 | −16 | −16 | −14 |
| (United States) DeChambeau | −17 | −17 | −18 | −17 | −18 | −17 | −17 | −17 | −18 | −17 | −14 | −14 | −14 | −14 | −13 | −13 | −13 | −12 |

Cumulative tournament scores, relative to par

| Birdie | Bogey | Double bogey | Triple bogey+ |

=== Playoff ===
| Place | Player | Score | To par | Money ($) |
|---|---|---|---|---|
| 1 | (Mexico) Abraham Ancer | 4-3 | −1 | 1,820,000 |
| T2 | (United States) Sam Burns | 4-4 | E | 917,500 |
| T2 | (Japan) Hideki Matsuyama | 4-4 | E | 917,500 |
