= Brasil Champions =

Golf tournament

Tournament information
- Location: São Paulo, Brazil
- Established: 2013
- Course: São Paulo Golf Club
- Par: 71
- Length: 6,574 yards (6,011 m)
- Tour: Web.com Tour
- Format: Stroke play
- Prize fund: US$700,000
- Final year: 2016

Tournament record score
- Aggregate: 259 Jon Curran (2014)
- To par: −25 as above

Final champion
- (United States) Andrew Svoboda
- Location in Brazil

The Brasil Champions was a golf tournament on the Web.com Tour. It was first played in April 2013 at the São Paulo Golf Club in São Paulo, Brazil. It was the richest golf tournament in Brazil, with a purse of US$700,000.

== Winners ==
| Year | Winner | Score | To par | Margin of victory | Runner(s)-up | Ref. |
Brasil Classic
| 2013 | (Chile) Benjamín Alvarado | 265 | −19 | 1 stroke | (South Africa) Dawie van der Walt | |
Brasil Champions
| 2014 | (United States) Jon Curran | 259 | −25 | 4 strokes | (Germany) Alex Čejka | |
| 2015 | (United States) Peter Malnati | 262 | −22 | 4 strokes | (Mexico) Abraham Ancer, (United States) Matt Davidson, (United States) Tyler Duncan, (Argentina) Julián Etulain, (United States) Tim Madigan, (United States) John Mallinger, (Sweden) Henrik Norlander | |
| 2016 | (United States) Andrew Svoboda | 261 | −23 | 1 stroke | (United States) Bhavik Patel | |
