= Abraham Ancer =

Mexican professional golfer (born 1991)

Personal information
- Full name: Abraham Ancer Sagastegui
- Nicknames: Honest Abe, El Turco
- Nationality: Mexico
- Born: 27 February 1991 (age 35) McAllen, Texas, U.S.
- Height: 5 ft 7 in (170 cm)
- Weight: 155 lb (70 kg)

Career
- Sport: Golf
- College: Odessa College; University of Oklahoma
- Turned professional: 2013
- Former tours: PGA Tour; European Tour; Web.com Tour; LIV Golf
- Professional wins: 6
- Highest ranking: 11 (8 August 2021) (as of 8 November 2026)

Number of wins by tour
- PGA Tour: 1
- European Tour: 1
- Asian Tour: 1
- PGA Tour of Australasia: 1
- Korn Ferry Tour: 1
- LIV Golf: 1
- Other: 1

Best results in major championships
- Masters Tournament: T13: 2020
- PGA Championship: T8: 2021
- U.S. Open: T49: 2019
- The Open Championship: T11: 2022
Medal record
Pan American Games
Gold medal – first place	2023 Santiago	Individual

Abraham Ancer Sagastegui (Note: In this Spanish name, the first or paternal surname is Ancer and the second or maternal family name is Sagastegui.) (Spanish pronunciation: [aˈβɾan ˈanseɾ]; born 27 February 1991) is an American-Mexican professional golfer who played on the PGA Tour and the LIV Golf tour. He won the 2018 Emirates Australian Open and the 2021 WGC-FedEx St. Jude Invitational for his first PGA Tour career victory. In 2024 he won the LIV Golf Hong Kong for his first individual win on the LIV Golf Tour.

== Amateur career ==
Ancer was born in McAllen, Texas; raised partially in Reynosa, Mexico; and has dual American and Mexican citizenship. He attended Sharyland High School in Mission, Texas. He played college golf at Odessa College and the University of Oklahoma, from which he graduated in 2013 with a degree in General Studies.

During his one-year competing at Odessa, Ancer was a first-team All-American and finished in a tie for second in the Junior College National Golf Championship. At Oklahoma, he saw his most success during his first year, winning twice while having the sixth-lowest scoring average in Oklahoma history of 72.03. During his entire career, he ended up second in all-time scoring average.

== Professional career ==
Ancer turned professional in 2013. In December 2014, he tied for 35th place at the Web.com Tour Qualifying School final stage. He played on the Web.com Tour in 2015, where he finished runner-up at the Brasil Champions in March and won the Nova Scotia Open in July.

He finished 11th in the regular season money list, which earned him a PGA Tour card for the 2016 season. In his rookie year, Ancer did not perform consistently, with a best finish of T-18 at the FedEx St. Jude Classic. He finished 190th in FedEx Cup points and couldn't maintain his card for the 2017 season, which sent him back to the Web.com Tour.

During the 2017 Web.com Tour, Ancer carded five top-5 finishes, including three runner-up finishes, which allowed him to secure his PGA Tour card for the 2018 season by finishing in 3rd place on the regular-season money list.

During the 2018 season, Ancer finished 9th at the OHL Classic at Mayakoba, 8th at the Houston Open, 4th at the Quicken Loans National, 5th at the RBC Canadian Open, and 7th at the Dell Technologies Championship. The Quicken Loans National was part of the Open Qualifying Series and his high finish gave him an entry to the 2018 Open Championship, his first major championship, where he had rounds of 71 and 78 and missed the cut. In the PGA Tour season Ancer earned US$1.7 million and finished 60th in the FedEx Cup.

Ancer had a good start to the 2018–19 season with top-5 finishes in the CIMB Classic and the Shriners Hospitals for Children Open, results that lifted him into the world top-100 for the first time. He followed this up with a 5-stroke victory in the Australian Open, a week before representing Mexico in the World Cup of Golf. His Australian Open win gave him an entry to the 2019 Open Championship. Ancer finished second in the Northern Trust in August 2019 and ended the year by tying for 21st at the Tour Championship. This earned him $478,000 in FedEx Cup bonus money.

Ancer's strong play in 2019 qualified him for the 2019 Presidents Cup International team. The event was held at Royal Melbourne Golf Club in December 2019. The U.S. team defeated the Internationals 16–14. Ancer went 3–1–1. His lone loss came in the Sunday singles, 3 & 2 against U.S. playing-captain Tiger Woods. Ancer had told media prior to the event that he wanted to play Woods in singles. Woods said afterward "Abe wanted it, he got it."

At the 2020 RBC Heritage, Ancer finished runner-up shooting −21, earning him $773,900. Ancer led the tournament in Driving Accuracy (82.1%) and Greens In Regulation (90.3%).

In May 2021, Ancer finished second at the Wells Fargo Championship. One shot behind Rory McIlroy. In late July/early August he played in the 2020 Tokyo Olympics, finishing tied for 14th place with Norway's Viktor Hovland after scoring 12-under-par for the four rounds of the Men's Tournament. The following week he obtained his first career victory in a PGA Tour event after winning the 2021 WGC-FedEx St. Jude Invitational after two sudden-death playoff holes against Hideki Matsuyama and Sam Burns. With the win, Ancer became the fourth Mexican player to win on the PGA Tour and the first to win on the European Tour.

Ancer joined LIV Golf in June 2022 following the U.S. Open, and was subsequently suspended from the PGA Tour. Ancer has one individual win on the tour, the 2024 LIV Golf Hong Kong and has also claimed a win in the team trophy in Bangkok.

In February 2023, Ancer won the PIF Saudi International on the Asian Tour. He shot a final-round 68 to win by two shots ahead of Cameron Young and claim a wire-to-wire victory.

== Amateur wins ==
- 2009 Odessa College Invitational
- 2010 Omega Chemical/Midland College, Texas Junior College Championship, NJCAA District 2 Championship
- 2011 Desert Shootout, NCAA East-VA Tech Regional

== Professional wins (6) ==
=== PGA Tour wins (1) ===
Legend
World Golf Championships (1)
Other PGA Tour (0)

No.	Date	Tournament	Winning score	To par	Margin of victory	Runners-up
1	8 Aug 2021	WGC-FedEx St. Jude Invitational	67-62-67-68=264	−16	Playoff	(United States) Sam Burns, (Japan) Hideki Matsuyama

PGA Tour playoff record (1–0)

No.	Year	Tournament	Opponents	Result
1	2021	WGC-FedEx St. Jude Invitational	(United States) Sam Burns, (Japan) Hideki Matsuyama	Won with birdie on second extra hole

=== European Tour wins (1) ===
Legend
World Golf Championships (1)
Other European Tour (0)

No.	Date	Tournament	Winning score	To par	Margin of victory	Runners-up
1	8 Aug 2021	WGC-FedEx St. Jude Invitational	67-62-67-68=264	−16	Playoff	(United States) Sam Burns, (Japan) Hideki Matsuyama

European Tour playoff record (1–0)

No.	Year	Tournament	Opponents	Result
1	2021	WGC-FedEx St. Jude Invitational	(United States) Sam Burns, (Japan) Hideki Matsuyama	Won with birdie on second extra hole

=== Asian Tour wins (1) ===
No.	Date	Tournament	Winning score	To par	Margin of victory	Runner-up
1	5 Feb 2023	PIF Saudi International	63-66-64-68=261	−19	2 strokes	(United States) Cameron Young

=== PGA Tour of Australasia wins (1) ===
Legend
Flagship events (1)
Other PGA Tour of Australasia (0)

No.	Date	Tournament	Winning score	To par	Margin of victory	Runner-up
1	18 Nov 2018	Emirates Australian Open	69-69-65-69=272	−16	5 strokes	(Australia) Dimitrios Papadatos

=== Web.com Tour wins (1) ===
No.	Date	Tournament	Winning score	To par	Margin of victory	Runner-up
1	5 Jul 2015	Nova Scotia Open	69-70-64-68=271	−13	Playoff	(United States) Bronson Burgoon

Web.com Tour playoff record (1–1)

No.	Year	Tournament	Opponent	Result
1	2015	Nova Scotia Open	(United States) Bronson Burgoon	Won with birdie on first extra hole
2	2017	Nashville Golf Open	(United States) Lanto Griffin	Lost to birdie on first extra hole

=== LIV Golf League wins (1) ===
No.	Date	Tournament	Winning score	To par	Margin of victory	Runners-up
1	10 Mar 2024	LIV Golf Hong Kong	63-62-72=197	−13	Playoff	(England) Paul Casey, (Australia) Cameron Smith

LIV Golf League playoff record (1–0)

No.	Year	Tournament	Opponents	Result
1	2024	LIV Golf Hong Kong	(England) Paul Casey, (Australia) Cameron Smith	Won with birdie on first extra hole

=== Other wins (1) ===
No.	Date	Tournament	Winning score	Margin of victory	Runner-up
1	5 Nov 2023	Pan American Games	−21 (68-67-65-67=267)	1 stroke	(Colombia) Sebastián Muñoz

== Results in major championships ==
Results not in chronological order before 2019 and in 2020.

Tournament	2018	2019	2020	2021	2022	2023	2024
Masters Tournament			T13	T26	CUT	T39	
PGA Championship		T16	T43	T8	T9	CUT	
U.S. Open		T49	T56	CUT		T54	
The Open Championship	CUT	CUT	NT	T59	T11	T49	T58

Top 10
Did not play

CUT = missed the half-way cut
"T" = tied
NT = no tournament due to COVID-19 pandemic

=== Summary ===
Tournament	Wins	2nd	3rd	Top-5	Top-10	Top-25	Events	Cuts made
Masters Tournament	0	0	0	0	0	1	4	3
PGA Championship	0	0	0	0	2	3	5	4
U.S. Open	0	0	0	0	0	0	4	3
The Open Championship	0	0	0	0	0	1	6	4
Totals	0	0	0	0	2	5	19	14

- Most consecutive cuts made – 6 (2020 PGA – 2021 PGA)
- Longest streak of top-10s – 1 (twice)

== Results in The Players Championship ==
Tournament	2019	2020	2021	2022
The Players Championship	T12	C	T22	T33

"T" indicates a tie for a place
C = Cancelled after the first round due to the COVID-19 pandemic

== World Golf Championships ==
=== Wins (1) ===
Year	Championship	54 holes	Winning score	Margin	Runners-up
2021	WGC-FedEx St. Jude Invitational	4-shot deficit	−16 (67-62-67-68=264)	Playoff	(United States) Sam Burns, (Japan) Hideki Matsuyama

=== Results timeline ===
Tournament	2018	2019	2020	2021	2022
Championship	T52	T39	T12	T18	
Match Play		T17	NT^{1}	T18	QF
Invitational			T15	1	
Champions		T4	NT^{1}	NT^{1}	NT^{1}

^{1}Cancelled due to COVID-19 pandemic

Win
Top 10
Did not play

QF, R16, R32, R64 = Round in which player lost in match play
NT = no tournament
"T" = tied
Note that the Championship and Invitational were discontinued from 2022.

== Team appearances ==
- World Cup (representing Mexico): 2018
- Presidents Cup (representing the International team): 2019

== See also ==
- 2015 Web.com Tour Finals graduates
- 2017 Web.com Tour Finals graduates
