= Bronson Burgoon =

American professional golfer (born 1987)

Personal information
- Full name: Bronson Burgoon
- Nationality: United States
- Born: June 2, 1987 (age 39) The Woodlands, Texas, U.S.
- Height: 6 ft 2 in (1.88 m)
- Weight: 190 lb (86 kg; 14 st)

Career
- Sport: Golf
- College: Texas A&M University
- Turned professional: 2010
- Current tour: PGA Tour
- Former tours: PGA Tour Latinoamérica; Web.com Tour
- Professional wins: 2

Best results in major championships
- Masters Tournament: DNP
- PGA Championship: T48: 2019
- U.S. Open: CUT: 2009
- The Open Championship: CUT: 2018

Bronson Burgoon (born June 2, 1987) is an American professional golfer.

== Early life ==
Burgoon was born in The Woodlands, Texas. He played golf The Woodlands High School and was an individual state champion in 2003.

== Amateur career ==
Burgoon played college golf at Texas A&M University and defeated Andrew Landry, 1 up, to give the Aggies the 2009 NCAA Championship. He was inducted to the Texas A&M Athletic Hall of Fame in 2018.

== Professional career ==
After playing on PGA Tour Latinoamérica in 2012 and 2013, Burgoon reached the Web.com Tour for the 2014 season through Q School. In 2015, he finished 18th on the regular-season Web.com Tour money list and graduated to the PGA Tour.

In his rookie PGA Tour season, Burgoon finished 132nd in the FedEx Cup standings, retaining conditional status for 2017. An injury kept him from competing between September 2016 and July 2017. He was granted a non-exempt medical extension, which also made him eligible for the 2017 Web.com Tour Finals. In the Finals, he earned enough to regain full status for the 2018 season.

Burgoon's best finishes on the PGA Tour are a pair of runner-ups at the 2018 John Deere Classic and the CIMB Classic.

== Professional wins (2) ==
=== Adams Pro Tour wins (2) ===
- 2012 Firewheel at Garland Classic, Twin Lakes Open

== Playoff record ==
Web.com Tour playoff record (0–1)

No.	Year	Tournament	Opponent	Result
1	2015	Nova Scotia Open	(Mexico) Abraham Ancer	Lost to birdie on first extra hole

== Results in major championships ==
Tournament	2009	2010	2011	2012	2013	2014	2015	2016	2017	2018
Masters Tournament										
U.S. Open	CUT									
The Open Championship										CUT
PGA Championship										

Tournament	2019
Masters Tournament	
PGA Championship	T48
U.S. Open	
The Open Championship	

Did not play

CUT = missed the half-way cut
"T" indicates a tie for a place

== Results in The Players Championship ==
Tournament	2019
The Players Championship	CUT

CUT = missed the halfway cut

== See also ==
- 2015 Web.com Tour Finals graduates
- 2017 Web.com Tour Finals graduates
- 2019 Korn Ferry Tour Finals graduates
- 2021 Korn Ferry Tour Finals graduates
