= Jon Curran =

American professional golfer (born 1987)

Personal information
- Full name: Jonathan Lynch Curran
- Nationality: United States
- Born: February 17, 1987 (age 39) Hopkinton, Massachusetts, U.S.
- Height: 5 ft 9 in (1.75 m)
- Weight: 165 lb (75 kg; 11.8 st)

Career
- Sport: Golf
- College: Vanderbilt University
- Turned professional: 2009
- Current tour: Korn Ferry Tour
- Former tour: PGA Tour
- Professional wins: 4
- Highest ranking: 89 (June 5, 2016)

Number of wins by tour
- Korn Ferry Tour: 1
- Other: 3

Best results in major championships
- Masters Tournament: DNP
- PGA Championship: T33: 2016
- U.S. Open: CUT: 2010
- The Open Championship: DNP

Jonathan Lynch Curran (born February 17, 1987) is an American professional golfer.

== Early life ==
Curran was born in Hopkinton, Massachusetts. He played college golf at Vanderbilt University.

== Professional career ==
In 2009, Curran turned professional. He played on the NGA Pro Golf Tour in 2013, winning one event and topping the money list.

Curran began playing on the Web.com Tour in 2014 and won his third event of the year, the Brasil Champions. He finished 12th on the 2014 Web.com Tour regular-season money list, earning a PGA Tour card for the 2014–15 season. Curran's best PGA Tour finishes are playoff losses at the 2015 Puerto Rico Open and 2016 Memorial Tournament.

== Professional wins (3) ==
=== Web.com Tour wins (1) ===
No.	Date	Tournament	Winning score	Margin of victory	Runner-up
1	Mar 16, 2014	Brasil Champions	−25 (61-64-65-69=259)	4 strokes	(Germany) Alex Čejka

=== NGA Pro Golf Tour wins (1) ===
- 2013 Brunswick-Heritage Oaks Classic

=== Other wins (2) ===
No.	Date	Tournament	Winning score	Margin of victory	Runners-up
1	Jul 1, 2015	CVS Health Charity Classic (with (United States) Keegan Bradley)	−21 (61-60=121)	2 strokes	(United States) Harris English and (United States) Lexi Thompson
2	Jun 29, 2016	CVS Health Charity Classic (2) (with (United States) Keegan Bradley)	−18 (63-61=124)	Playoff	(United States) Billy Andrade and (United States) Bill Haas

Other playoff record (1–0)

No.	Year	Tournament	Opponents	Result
1	2016	CVS Health Charity Classic (with (United States) Keegan Bradley)	(United States) Billy Andrade and (United States) Bill Haas	Won with birdie on first extra hole

== Playoff record ==
PGA Tour playoff record (0–2)

No.	Year	Tournament	Opponent(s)	Result
1	2015	Puerto Rico Open	(Germany) Alex Čejka, (Argentina) Emiliano Grillo, (United States) Tim Petrovic, (United States) Sam Saunders	Čejka won with birdie on first extra hole
2	2016	Memorial Tournament	(United States) William McGirt	Lost to par on second extra hole

== Results in major championships ==
Tournament	2010	2011	2012	2013	2014	2015	2016
Masters Tournament							
U.S. Open	CUT						
The Open Championship							
PGA Championship							T33

Did not play

CUT = missed the half-way cut
"T" = tied

== See also ==
- 2014 Web.com Tour Finals graduates
