= Derek Fathauer =

American professional golfer

Personal information
- Full name: Derek Jay Fathauer
- Nationality: United States
- Born: January 20, 1986 (age 40) Stuart, Florida, U.S.
- Height: 6 ft 1 in (1.85 m)
- Weight: 183 lb (83 kg; 13.1 st)

Career
- Sport: Golf
- College: University of Louisville
- Turned professional: 2008
- Current tour: PGA Tour
- Former tour: Web.com Tour
- Professional wins: 1

Number of wins by tour
- Korn Ferry Tour: 1

Best results in major championships
- Masters Tournament: DNP
- PGA Championship: DNP
- U.S. Open: T23: 2016
- The Open Championship: DNP

Achievements and awards
- Web.com Tour Finals money list winner: 2014

Derek Jay Fathauer (born January 20, 1986) is an American professional golfer who has played on the PGA Tour and the Web.com Tour.

== Early life ==
Fathauer was born in Stuart, Florida. He attended Martin County High School in Stuart, Florida. He and his twin brother Daryl played in the Ginn sur Mer Classic in October 2007, the first twins to do so in a PGA Tour event.

== Amateur career ==
Fathauer qualified for the 2008 U.S. Open. He qualified by coming in a tie for third, shooting 67-68, in a sectional qualifying event at the OSU golf club, Scarlet Course. In the qualifying stage, he finished ahead of veterans such as Davis Love III and Jesper Parnevik. In the U.S. Open played at Torrey Pines Golf Course in San Diego, California, he shot 73-73 to make the cut by 4 strokes. He was, through two rounds, the lowest amateur score in the field, edging Michael Thompson by one stroke and Rickie Fowler by three strokes. However, he struggled on the weekend, shooting 78-75 to finish in a tie for 69th at +15 and in third for the amateurs.

Fathauer had much success at the U.S. Amateur throughout the years. In 2006, he made the first round of match play at Hazeltine National Golf Club, located in Chaska, Minnesota. In 2007, he made the quarterfinals. In 2008, he also made the quarterfinals, beating Kevin Tway. However his road to the quarterfinals was not easy. He required 20 holes to win in the round of 32 and 22 holes in the round of 16 before losing to runner-up Drew Kittleson in the quarters.

Fathauer was also a member of the United States Palmer Cup team. During the cup, he won a team high three points. However, team USA lost the event 14–10 to the European squad.

== Professional career ==
Fathauer turned professional on September 17, 2008. He advanced to the final stage of the 2008 PGA Tour Q-School in La Quinta, California at the PGA West Golf Community. He earned his Tour card for 2009 after finishing in a tie for second. Fathauer finished eight shots behind Harrison Frazar after shooting 70-69-65-67-67-70 for a total score of 408.

Fathauer made his professional PGA Tour debut at the Sony Open in Hawaii on January 15, 2009, where he missed the cut by one stroke after shooting a 73-69=142 (+2). He made his first cut on Tour at the AT&T Pebble Beach National Pro-Am. He shot 71-71-69=211 to make the cut. During the tournament, he also recorded his first ace of his professional career at the 15th hole of Spyglass Hill Golf Course, in Pebble Beach, California.

Fathauer earned his first professional win at the 2014 Web.com Tour Championship. The win made Fathauer fully exempt on the PGA Tour for the 2014–15 season for leading the Web.com Tour Finals money list. He also earned an invitation to the 2015 Players Championship.

== Professional wins (1) ==
=== Web.com Tour wins (1) ===
Legend
Finals events (1)
Other Web.com Tour (0)

No.	Date	Tournament	Winning score	To par	Margin of victory	Runner-up
1	Sep 21, 2014	Web.com Tour Championship	65-66-67-68=266	−14	1 stroke	(United States) Zac Blair

Web.com Tour playoff record (0–1)

No.	Year	Tournament	Opponent	Result
1	2014	Nova Scotia Open	(Canada) Roger Sloan	Lost to par on first extra hole

== Results in major championships ==
Tournament	2008	2009	2010	2011	2012	2013	2014	2015	2016
Masters Tournament									
U.S. Open	T69								T23
The Open Championship									
PGA Championship									

Did not play

CUT = missed the halfway cut
"T" indicates a tie for a place.

== Results in The Players Championship ==
Tournament	2015	2016	2017	2018
The Players Championship	T17		CUT	CUT

Did not play

CUT = missed the halfway cut
"T" indicates a tie for a place

== U.S. national team appearances ==
Amateur

- Palmer Cup: 2008

== See also ==
- 2008 PGA Tour Qualifying School graduates
- 2014 Web.com Tour Finals graduates
- 2015 Web.com Tour Finals graduates
