= Blayne Barber =

American professional golfer (born 1989)

Personal information
- Full name: Blayne Lawrence Barber
- Nationality: United States
- Born: December 25, 1989 (age 36) Tallahassee, Florida, U.S.
- Height: 5 ft 10 in (1.78 m)
- Weight: 165 lb (75 kg; 11.8 st)

Career
- Sport: Golf
- College: University of Central Florida; Auburn University
- Turned professional: 2012
- Current tour: Korn Ferry Tour
- Former tour: PGA Tour
- Professional wins: 1

Number of wins by tour
- Korn Ferry Tour: 1

Best results in major championships
- Masters Tournament: DNP
- PGA Championship: DNP
- U.S. Open: CUT: 2015
- The Open Championship: DNP

Blayne Lawrence Barber (born December 25, 1989) is an American professional golfer.

== Early life and amateur career ==
Barber was born in Tallahassee, Florida. He played college golf at University of Central Florida and Auburn University. At UCF, he was an All-American his freshman year. In his two years at Auburn, Barber was a two time All-SEC honoree and named to two All-American teams. He holds the record for the lowest career stroke average in Auburn golf history at 70.83. He won two events as a collegiate as well as the 2009 Florida State Amateur. Barber also played on the 2011 and 2012 Palmer Cup and 2011 Walker Cup teams.

== Professional career ==
Barber turned professional in 2012. He played on the Web.com Tour through 2014. He picked up his first win in 2014 at the South Georgia Classic. He finished 16th in the Web.com Tour Finals to earn his PGA Tour card for the 2014–15 season.

At the 2012 PGA Tour qualifying school, Barber disqualified himself from the tournament for signing an incorrect scorecard.

== Amateur wins ==
- 2009 Florida State Amateur

== Professional wins (1) ==
=== Web.com Tour wins (1) ===
No.	Date	Tournament	Winning score	To par	Margin of victory	Runner-up
1	May 4, 2014	South Georgia Classic	68-72-66-67=273	−15	2 strokes	(United States) Alex Prugh

== Playoff record ==
PGA Tour playoff record (0–1)

No.	Year	Tournament	Opponents	Result
1	2016	RSM Classic	(United States) Billy Horschel, (Canada) Mackenzie Hughes, (Sweden) Henrik Norlander, (Colombia) Camilo Villegas	Hughes won with par on third extra hole Horschel eliminated by par on first hole

== U.S. national team appearances ==
- Palmer Cup: 2011 (winners), 2012
- Walker Cup: 2011

== See also ==
- 2014 Web.com Tour Finals graduates
