= Keegan Bradley =

American professional golfer (born 1986)

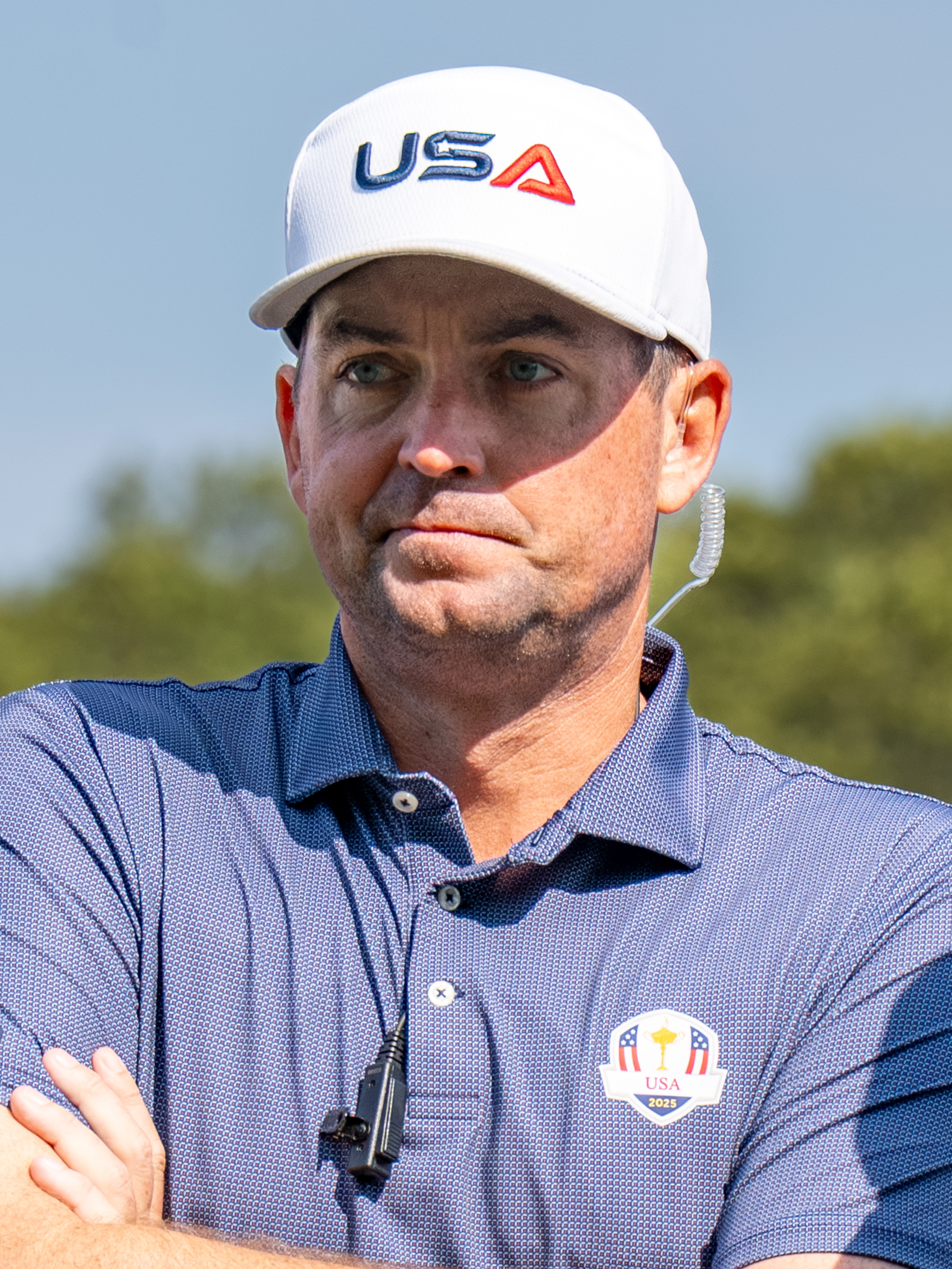
- Bradley at the 2025 Ryder Cup

Personal information
- Full name: Keegan Hansen Bradley
- Nationality: United States
- Born: June 7, 1986 (age 40) Woodstock, Vermont, U.S.
- Height: 6 ft 3 in (1.91 m)
- Weight: 190 lb (86 kg; 14 st)
- Spouse: Jillian Stacey

Career
- Sport: Golf
- College: St. John's University
- Turned professional: 2008
- Current tour: PGA Tour
- Former tours: Nationwide Tour; NGA Hooters Tour
- Professional wins: 14
- Highest ranking: 7 (June 22, 2025) (as of October 25, 2026)

Number of wins by tour
- PGA Tour: 8
- European Tour: 2
- Other: 6

Best results in major championships (wins: 1)
- Masters Tournament: T21: 2026
- PGA Championship: Won: 2011
- U.S. Open: T4: 2014
- The Open Championship: T15: 2013

Achievements and awards
- PGA Tour Rookie of the Year: 2011

Keegan Hansen Bradley (born June 7, 1986) is an American professional golfer who competes on the PGA Tour. He has won eight tour events, most notably the 2011 PGA Championship. He is one of six golfers to win on their major debut, along with Ben Curtis, Fred Herd, Willie Park, Sr., Francis Ouimet and Horace Rawlins. He was the 2011 PGA Tour Rookie of the Year and has briefly featured in the top ten of the Official World Golf Ranking. He captained Team USA in the 2025 Ryder Cup.

== Early life and college career ==
Bradley is the eldest child of Mark Bradley, the head professional at the Jackson Hole Golf and Tennis Club just outside Jackson, Wyoming. Growing up as an all-state ski racer in Woodstock, Vermont, Bradley decided as a teenager to pursue golf over skiing. He lived in Portsmouth, New Hampshire in 2001 and 2002 when his father was an assistant pro at Portsmouth Country Club. He then moved to Hopkinton, Massachusetts prior to his senior year at Hopkinton High School, where he won the Massachusetts Interscholastic Athletic Association (MIAA) Division 2 individual state championship in 2004. Hopkinton coach Dick Bliss later recalled that Bradley received the third-most attention of his players that season, and that "not many big-time college recruiters gave him much of a look." Bradley attended St. John's University and won nine collegiate events before graduating in 2008.

== Professional career ==
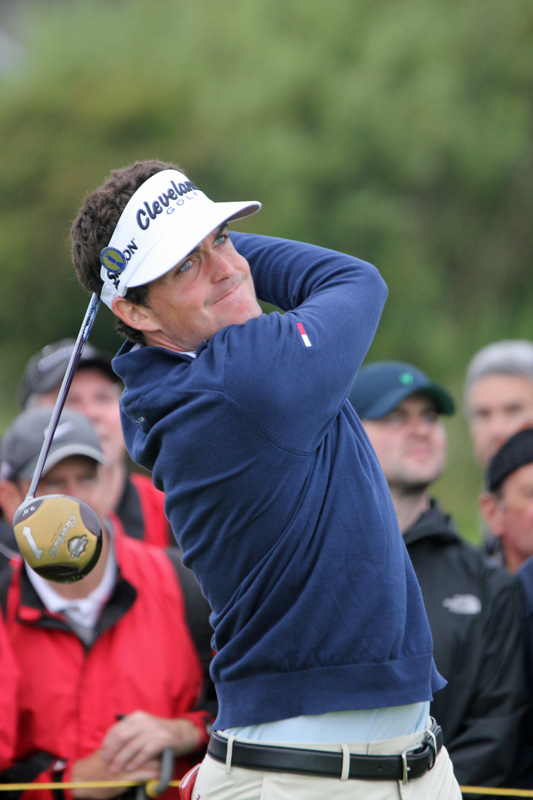
Bradley in 2012

=== 2008-2010: early years ===
Bradley turned professional in 2008 and began playing on the NGA Hooters Tour, where he won at Southern Dunes in his fifth and final start of the year. Bradley won a second Hooters Tour event in 2009 at the Texas Honing Open. He made 22 cuts in 26 events that season and earned $84,000. He also played two Nationwide Tour events that year, making the cut in both of them. He attempted to earn a 2010 PGA Tour card through qualifying school but ultimately fell short by two strokes. In 2010, Bradley played on the Nationwide Tour, where he recorded four consecutive top-five finishes late in the season to finish 14th on the money list and earn his PGA Tour card for 2011.

=== 2011: PGA rookie season, first major win ===
Bradley made the cut in his first PGA Tour event, the 2011 Sony Open in Hawaii, and finished T-7 the following week at the Bob Hope Classic. He added a second top 10 finish at the Valero Texas Open in April. Bradley won his first PGA Tour event at the 2011 HP Byron Nelson Championship. He defeated Ryan Palmer on the first hole of a sudden-death playoff. The victory gained him entry into the 2011 WGC-Bridgestone Invitational, where he shared the 36-hole lead and led midway through the final round before finishing T-15.

==== PGA Championship ====
The week after the WGC-Bridgestone Invitational, Bradley played in his first major, the 2011 PGA Championship. A second-round 64 propelled him into a share of the lead at the halfway stage, and Bradley remained only one shot out of the lead after 54 holes. In the final round, he triple-bogeyed the 15th hole to fall five shots behind Jason Dufner with three holes to play before recovering with back-to-back birdies on 16 and 17 which, combined with three consecutive bogeys for Dufner, left Dufner and Bradley tied after 72 holes of regulation play. Bradley won the three-hole playoff with a birdie and two pars, while Dufner went par-bogey-birdie to finish one stroke behind. Bradley became only the third player after Francis Ouimet (1913) and Ben Curtis (2003) to win a major in his first attempt, and was the first golfer to win a major with a long putter. He also became the seventh consecutive first-time major winner and the first American major champion since Phil Mickelson won the 2010 Masters. With the victory, Bradley moved from number 108 to number 29 in the Official World Golf Ranking. In December, he was named the PGA Tour Rookie of the Year.

=== 2012 ===
At the 2012 Northern Trust Open, Bradley and Phil Mickelson each made long birdie putts on the 72nd hole to force a three-man playoff with Bill Haas, who made a 45-foot birdie putt on the second playoff hole to win the tournament. Bradley held a two-stroke lead during the final round of the 2012 WGC-Cadillac Championship but dropped four shots over the final four holes, including a double bogey on the 18th, to finish T-8. He started the season with nine consecutive top-25 finishes, then had just one in his next ten outings. In June, Bradley played in Europe for the first time at The Irish Open at Royal Portrush and missed the cut.

==== WGC-Bridgestone Invitational ====
Bradley won his third PGA Tour event at the 2012 WGC-Bridgestone Invitational by a stroke over Jim Furyk and Steve Stricker. Entering the final round trailing Jim Furyk by four strokes, Bradley narrowed the deficit to one going to the final hole. Bradley converted a 15-foot par putt while Furyk made double bogey to lose by one stroke. Bradley became the 11th player to win a major championship and a World Golf Championship. The win elevated Bradley to 15th in the world rankings. He moved up to a career high of 12th the next week, when he finished T3 at the 2012 PGA Championship. For the season, Bradley finished 10th on the PGA Tour's money list. Bradley qualified for the 2012 Ryder Cup, marking his first appearance in any cup competition.

=== 2013 ===
Bradley had two second-place finishes in 2013. The first occurred in May at the HP Byron Nelson Championship where he shot a course-record 60 at the TPC Four Seasons in the first round. Bradley had a one-shot lead going into the final round but was overtaken by Sang-Moon Bae. In August, Bradley finished second again, this time by seven strokes, to Tiger Woods at the WGC-Bridgestone Invitational at Firestone. For the season Bradley had seven top-tens and finished 11th on the PGA Tour's money list. Following the season, Bradley was a member of the winning United States team at the Presidents Cup played at Muirfield Village in Ohio.

=== 2014 ===
Bradley's highest finish in 2014 was a second place at the Arnold Palmer Invitational at Bay Hill. Adam Scott faltered during Sunday's final round but it was Matt Every rather than Bradley who won a come-from-behind victory. For the season Bradley had six top-tens and finished 28th on the PGA Tour's money list. Following the season, Bradley was a captain's pick for the Ryder Cup played in Scotland.

=== 2015 ===
In 2015, Bradley had his worst season since joining the PGA Tour. Playing 24 events Bradley only had three top-tens and finished 64th on the PGA Tour's money list. For the first time in four years Bradley did not represent the United States in a year-end international competition.

=== 2016–2017 ===
These were two down years for Bradley. He didn't win a tournament and finished 114 and 51 on the PGA Tour money list.

=== 2017–2018 ===
In 2018, Bradley won the BMW Championship. This event was part of the FedEx Cup Playoffs. He qualified for the season-ending Tour Championship and finished 8th in the season-long FedEx Cup.

=== 2018–2019 ===
In June 2019, Bradley shot −13 for the week at the Travelers Championship and finished tied for second with Zack Sucher. The winner that week was Chez Reavie.

=== 2022 ===
In October 2022, Bradley won the Zozo Championship for his fifth PGA Tour victory and his first since the 2018 BMW Championship.

=== 2023 ===
In June, Bradley won the Travelers Championship for his sixth PGA Tour victory. Bradley broke the tournament's scoring record with a score of 23-under 257.

=== 2024 ===
In August, Bradley won the BMW Championship for the second time, becoming the first Ryder Cup captain to win a PGA Tour event since Davis Love III in 2015.

=== 2025 ===
In June, Bradley won the Travelers Championship for the second time in three years. Bradley rallied from three shots behind with four holes to play and birdied the 18th hole to win by one over Tommy Fleetwood and Russell Henley.

In November, Bradley won the Skins Game with 11 skins worth $2.1 million.

== Personal life ==
Bradley's aunt is former LPGA player and World Golf Hall of Fame member Pat Bradley. As a child he attended some of her tournaments and he has called her an inspiration. His other aunt, Peggy, is a 7-time Women's Club Champion at York Golf and Tennis Club in York, Maine. He is a fan of Boston Red Sox baseball, Boston Celtics basketball, New England Patriots football and Boston Bruins hockey, and has said his dream golf foursome includes his father, Ben Hogan, and Tom Brady. Bradley considers frequent practice-round partner Phil Mickelson a mentor, and he credits Mickelson for helping him win the 2011 PGA Championship. Bradley is also close friends with Jason Dufner, and was one of the first to personally congratulate him after his victory in the 2013 PGA Championship.

== Amateur wins ==
- 2005 The Tillinghast, Wyoming State Amateur
- 2006 The Tillinghast, UTSA Invitational, Wyoming State Golf Association Match Play Tournament
- 2007 Treasure Coast Classic, Lacrosse Homes Collegiate Invitational
- 2008 Hawk's Invitational, Palmas Del Mar Intercollegiate, Ironwood Intercollegiate, Princeton Invitational

== Professional wins (14) ==
=== PGA Tour wins (8) ===
Legend
Major championships (1)
World Golf Championships (1)
FedEx Cup playoff events (2)
Signature events (2)
Other PGA Tour (2)

No.	Date	Tournament	Winning score	Margin of victory	Runner(s)-up
1	May 29, 2011	HP Byron Nelson Championship	−3 (66-71-72-68=277)	Playoff	(United States) Ryan Palmer
2	Aug 14, 2011	PGA Championship	−8 (71-64-69-68=272)	Playoff	(United States) Jason Dufner
3	Aug 5, 2012	WGC-Bridgestone Invitational	−13 (67-69-67-64=267)	1 stroke	(United States) Jim Furyk, (United States) Steve Stricker
4	Sep 10, 2018	BMW Championship	−20 (66-64-66-64=260)	Playoff	(England) Justin Rose
5	Oct 16, 2022	Zozo Championship^{1}	−15 (66-65-66-68=265)	1 stroke	(United States) Rickie Fowler, (United States) Andrew Putnam
6	Jun 25, 2023	Travelers Championship	−23 (62-63-64-68=257)	3 strokes	(United States) Zac Blair, (United States) Brian Harman
7	Aug 25, 2024	BMW Championship (2)	−12 (66-68-70-72=276)	1 stroke	(Sweden) Ludvig Åberg, (United States) Sam Burns, (Australia) Adam Scott
8	Jun 22, 2025	Travelers Championship (2)	−15 (64-70-63-68=265)	1 stroke	(England) Tommy Fleetwood, (United States) Russell Henley

^{1}Co-sanctioned by the Japan Golf Tour, but unofficial event on that tour.

PGA Tour playoff record (3–2)

No.	Year	Tournament	Opponent(s)	Result
1	2011	HP Byron Nelson Championship	(United States) Ryan Palmer	Won with par on first extra hole
2	2011	PGA Championship	(United States) Jason Dufner	Won three-hole aggregate playoff; Bradley: −1 (3-3-4=10), Dufner: E (4-4-3=11)
3	2012	Northern Trust Open	(United States) Bill Haas, (United States) Phil Mickelson	Haas won with birdie on second extra hole
4	2018	BMW Championship	(England) Justin Rose	Won with par on first extra hole
5	2024	Sony Open in Hawaii	(South Korea) An Byeong-hun, (United States) Grayson Murray	Murray won with birdie on first extra hole

=== NGA Hooters Tour wins (1) ===
No.	Date	Tournament	Winning score	Margin of victory	Runner-up
1	Aug 9, 2009	Texas Honing Open	−18 (65-68-68-69=270)	5 strokes	(United States) Jeff Corr

=== Other wins (5) ===
No.	Date	Tournament	Winning score	Margin of victory	Runner(s)-up
1	Oct 19, 2011	PGA Grand Slam of Golf	−4 (67-71=138)	1 stroke	(South Africa) Charl Schwartzel
2	Dec 11, 2011	Franklin Templeton Shootout (with (United States) Brendan Steele)	−32 (63-62-59=184)	3 strokes	(United States) Mark Calcavecchia and (Zimbabwe) Nick Price, (South Africa) Rory Sabbatini and (Venezuela) Jhonattan Vegas
3	Jul 1, 2015	CVS Health Charity Classic (with (United States) Jon Curran)	−21 (61-60=121)	2 strokes	(United States) Harris English and (United States) Lexi Thompson
4	Jun 29, 2016	CVS Health Charity Classic (2) (with (United States) Jon Curran)	−18 (63-61=124)	Playoff	(United States) Billy Andrade and (United States) Bill Haas
5	Nov 28, 2025	TMRW Skins Game	$2,100,000	$400,000	(England) Tommy Fleetwood

Other playoff record (1–0)

No.	Year	Tournament	Opponents	Result
1	2016	CVS Health Charity Classic (with (United States) Jon Curran)	(United States) Billy Andrade and (United States) Bill Haas	Won with birdie on first extra hole

== Major championships ==
=== Wins (1) ===
Year	Championship	54 holes	Winning score	Margin	Runner-up
2011	PGA Championship	1 shot deficit	−8 (71-64-69-68=272)	Playoff^{1}	(United States) Jason Dufner

^{1}Defeated Jason Dufner in a three-hole playoff: Bradley (3-3-4=10), Dufner (4-4-3=11).

=== Results timeline ===
Results not in chronological order in 2020.

Tournament	2011	2012	2013	2014	2015	2016	2017	2018
Masters Tournament		T27	T54	CUT	T22	T52		
U.S. Open		T68	CUT	T4	T27	CUT	T60	CUT
The Open Championship		T34	T15	T19	CUT	T18		79
PGA Championship	1	T3	T19	CUT	T61	T42	T33	T42

Tournament	2019	2020	2021	2022	2023	2024	2025	2026
Masters Tournament	T43				T23	T22	CUT	T21
PGA Championship	T29	CUT	T17	T48	T29	T18	T8	CUT
U.S. Open	CUT	CUT		T7	CUT	T32	T33	T32
The Open Championship	CUT	NT	CUT	CUT	CUT	CUT	T30	T74

Win
Top 10
Did not play

CUT = missed the half-way cut
"T" = tied
NT = no tournament due to COVID-19 pandemic

=== Summary ===
Tournament	Wins	2nd	3rd	Top-5	Top-10	Top-25	Events	Cuts made
Masters Tournament	0	0	0	0	0	4	10	8
PGA Championship	1	0	1	2	3	6	16	13
U.S. Open	0	0	0	1	2	2	14	8
The Open Championship	0	0	0	0	0	3	13	7
Totals	1	0	1	3	5	15	53	36

- Most consecutive cuts made – 6 (2011 PGA – 2013 Masters)
- Longest streak of top-10s – 1 (five times)

== Results in The Players Championship ==
Tournament	2011	2012	2013	2014	2015	2016	2017	2018	2019
The Players Championship	72	T35	CUT	CUT	CUT	T35	T60	T7	T16

Tournament	2020	2021	2022	2023	2024	2025	2026
The Players Championship	C	T29	5	CUT	CUT	T20	T50

Top 10

CUT = missed the halfway cut
"T" indicates a tie for a place
C = canceled after the first round due to the COVID-19 pandemic

== World Golf Championships ==
=== Wins (1) ===
Year	Championship	54 holes	Winning score	Margin	Runners-up
2012	WGC-Bridgestone Invitational	4 shot deficit	−13 (67-69-67-64=267)	1 stroke	(United States) Jim Furyk, (United States) Steve Stricker

=== Results timeline ===
Results not in chronological order before 2015.

Tournament	2011	2012	2013	2014	2015	2016	2017	2018	2019	2020	2021	2022	2023
Championship		T8	7	T50	T38				T10				
Match Play		R32	R64	R64	T52			T36	T40	NT^{1}		T35	T28
Invitational	T15	1	T2	T4	T17				T61	T52			
Champions	T16	23	T11	T64				6	T24	NT^{1}	NT^{1}	NT^{1}	

^{1}Cancelled due to COVID-19 pandemic

Win
Top 10
Did not play

QF, R16, R32, R64 = Round in which player lost in match play
NT = No tournament
"T" = Tied
Note that the Championship and Invitational were discontinued from 2022. The Champions was discontinued from 2023.

== PGA Tour career summary ==
Season	Wins (Majors)	Earnings (US$)	Rank
2011	2 (1)	3,758,600	13
2012	1	3,910,658	10
2013	0	3,636,813	11
2014	0	2,828,638	28
2015	0	1,565,079	64
2016	0	899,985	114
2017	0	1,940,478	51
2018	1	4,069,464	17
2019	0	1,902,797	58
2020	0	824,471	106
2021	0	2,572,089	39
2022	0	3,623,137	27
2023	2	9,010,040	9
2024	1	6,879,455	9
Career*	7 (1)	50,865,497	16

* As of the June 15, 2025.

== U.S. national team appearances ==
Professional

- Ryder Cup: 2012, 2014, 2025 (captain)
- Presidents Cup: 2013 (winners), 2024 (winners)
- CVS Health Charity Classic: 2017 (winners), 2018 (winners), 2019 (winners)

== See also ==
- 2010 Nationwide Tour graduates
- List of men's major championships winning golfers
