= William McGirt =

American professional golfer (born 1979)

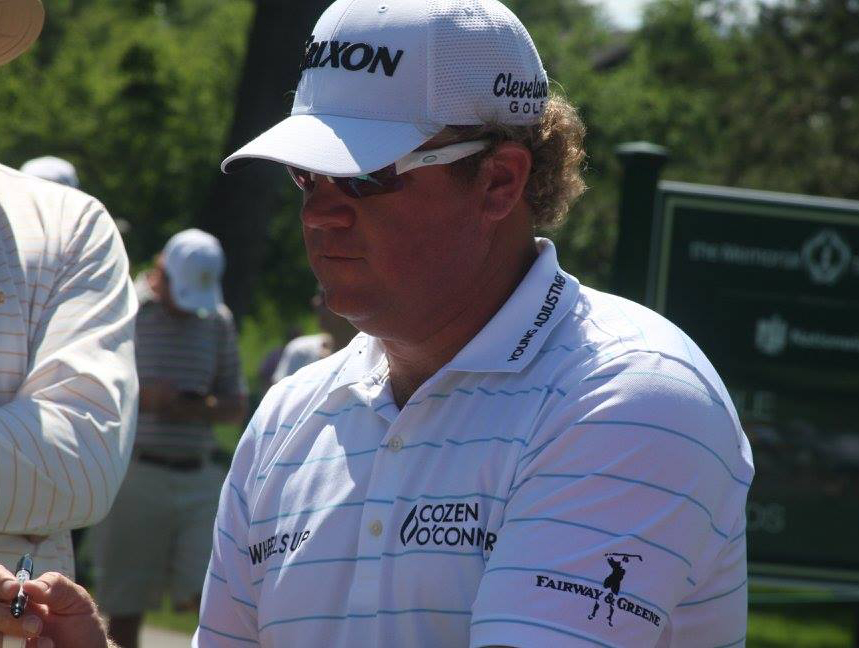
- McGirt in 2017

Personal information
- Full name: William Curtis McGirt III
- Nickname: Dirt McGirt
- Nationality: United States
- Born: June 21, 1979 (age 47) Fairmont, North Carolina, U.S.
- Height: 5 ft 8 in (1.73 m)
- Weight: 195 lb (88 kg; 13.9 st)
- Spouse: Sarah McGirt (m. 2004)
- Children: 2

Career
- Sport: Golf
- College: Wofford College
- Turned professional: 2004
- Current tour: PGA Tour
- Former tours: Nationwide Tour; Tarheel Tour
- Professional wins: 2
- Highest ranking: 38 (July 31, 2016)

Number of wins by tour
- PGA Tour: 1
- Other: 1

Best results in major championships
- Masters Tournament: T22: 2017
- PGA Championship: T10: 2016
- U.S. Open: T55: 2017
- The Open Championship: CUT: 2016, 2017

William Curtis McGirt III (born June 21, 1979) is an American professional golfer who plays on the PGA Tour.

== Early life and amateur career ==
In 1979, McGirt was born in Fairmont, North Carolina, U.S. He grew up playing both baseball and golf and received scholarship offers from colleges in North Carolina and South Carolina.

After being recruited by multiple colleges for both sports, McGirt decided to play college golf at Wofford College in Spartanburg, South Carolina. While playing for Wofford, in 1998, he earned the Southern Conference's Freshman of the Year award. He won three collegiate events for the Terriers including the conference championship his senior year. In 2001, McGirt graduated.

== Professional career ==
McGirt turned professional in 2004 and spent several years playing on mini-tours. His first break came by reaching the final stage of the 2009 PGA Tour Qualifying Tournament (Q-School), allowing him to play on the Nationwide Tour in 2010. He ended 2010 at 34th on that tour's money list, then finished runner-up at Q-School to earn his PGA Tour card for 2011. McGirt qualified for the FedEx Cup Playoffs in his rookie season, advancing as far as the Deutsche Bank Championship and finishing 83rd in the FedEx Cup standings. He finished 141st on the 2011 PGA Tour money list. Unfortunately, it was the money list that mattered at the time and McGirt had to go back to Q School to regain his Tour privileges or be relegated to the conditional category. He qualified for the tour in 2012 by finishing T13 in the 2011 Q-School.

McGirt's first appearance in a major was at the PGA Championship in 2012, where he missed the cut. He had three runner-up finishes before his first win at age 36 in June 2016 at the Memorial Tournament in Ohio. He won on the second hole of a sudden-death playoff with Jon Curran. It was McGirt's first professional win since his mini-tour victory nine years earlier in 2007. He earned $1.53 million for winning the Memorial, almost 100 times more than the $16,000 prize for his mini-tour win. The win earned him a three-year PGA Tour exemption, moved him to 44th in the Official World Golf Ranking, and qualified him for the U.S. Open, PGA Championship, and the Masters. McGirt also qualified for the 2016 Open Championship based on his FedEx Cup position. His career high world ranking is 38th, after a T10 at the 2016 PGA Championship.

McGirt's 2018 season ended at The Northern Trust. He had surgery on his left hip and did not play the 2018–19 season. He entered the 2019–20 season with 29 starts and 375.582 points to meet the terms of his medical extension, but could not meet the requirements. McGirt failed to regain his PGA Tour card for 2022, but was one of five players who were not already exempt (26-75th Korn Ferry Tour standings or 126-150th FedEx Cup) to earn a "Floor of Five" exemption and full Korn Ferry Tour privileges for 2023.

As of 2022, William has more than fifty top-25 finishes and has earned more than eleven million dollars.

== Personal life ==
McGirt is married to Sara McGirt, a fellow Wofford alumnus. They have two children.

== Awards and honors ==
- In 1998, while playing at Wofford College, he earned the Southern Conference Freshman of the Year award.
- In 2010, he was inducted into the Wofford College Athletic Hall of Fame.

== Amateur wins ==
- 2003 Cardinal Amateur, North Carolina Amateur

== Professional wins (2) ==
=== PGA Tour wins (1) ===
No.	Date	Tournament	Winning score	To par	Margin of victory	Runner-up
1	Jun 5, 2016	Memorial Tournament	70-68-64-71=273	−15	Playoff	(United States) Jon Curran

PGA Tour playoff record (1–0)

No.	Year	Tournament	Opponent	Result
1	2016	Memorial Tournament	(United States) Jon Curran	Won with par on second extra hole

=== Tarheel Tour wins (1) ===
No.	Date	Tournament	Winning score	To par	Margin of victory	Runner-up
1	May 4, 2007	Cabarrus Classic	67-68-71=206	−10	Playoff	(United States) Rohan Allwood

== Results in major championships ==
Tournament	2012	2013	2014	2015	2016	2017
Masters Tournament						T22
U.S. Open					CUT	T55
The Open Championship					CUT	CUT
PGA Championship	CUT				T10	CUT

Top 10
Did not play

CUT = missed the half-way cut
"T" indicates a tie for a place

=== Summary ===
Tournament	Wins	2nd	3rd	Top-5	Top-10	Top-25	Events	Cuts made
Masters Tournament	0	0	0	0	0	1	1	1
U.S. Open	0	0	0	0	0	0	2	1
The Open Championship	0	0	0	0	0	0	2	0
PGA Championship	0	0	0	0	1	1	3	1
Totals	0	0	0	0	1	2	8	3

- Most consecutive cuts made – 3 (2016 PGA – 2017 U.S. Open)
- Longest streak of top-10s – 1

== Results in The Players Championship ==
Tournament	2013	2014	2015	2016	2017	2018
The Players Championship	T43	CUT	CUT	T43	T22	CUT

CUT = missed the halfway cut
"T" indicates a tie for a place

== Results in World Golf Championships ==
Tournament	2016	2017
Championship		T28
Match Play		R16
Invitational	T7	
Champions		

Top 10
Did not play

QF, R16, R32, R64 = Round in which player lost in match play
"T" = Tied

== FedEx Cup final standing ==
Year	Rank
2011	83
2012	50
2013	100
2014	61
2015	69
2016	24
2017	85
2018	116
2020	247

== See also ==
- 2010 PGA Tour Qualifying School graduates
- 2011 PGA Tour Qualifying School graduates
