= 2020 PGA Championship field =

Golfers qualified or invited to play in the 2020 PGA Championship

This page lists the criteria used to determine the field for the 2020 PGA Championship, the first of the men's major golf championships in 2020, and the players who qualified via them. Some criteria were amended after the tournament was postponed due to the COVID-19 pandemic.

== Entrants by eligibility criteria ==
Each player is listed according to the first category by which he qualified with additional categories in which he qualified shown in parentheses.

=== 1. Former winners of the PGA Championship ===
All former winners of the PGA Championship:

- Rich Beem
- Keegan Bradley
- Jason Day (9)
- Jason Dufner
- Martin Kaymer
- Brooks Koepka (3,7,9,10,11)
- Davis Love III
- Rory McIlroy (5,7,9,10,11)
- Shaun Micheel
- Phil Mickelson (10)
- Justin Thomas (9,10,11)
- Jimmy Walker
- Tiger Woods (2,9,10,11)
- The following former champions did not enter: Paul Azinger, Mark Brooks, Jack Burke Jr., Steve Elkington, Dow Finsterwald, Raymond Floyd, Al Geiberger, Wayne Grady, David Graham, Don January, John Mahaffey, Larry Nelson, Bobby Nichols, Jack Nicklaus, Gary Player, Nick Price, Jeff Sluman, Dave Stockton, Hal Sutton, David Toms, Lee Trevino, Bob Tway, Lanny Wadkins, Yang Yong-eun
- Pádraig Harrington withdrew due concerns surrounding COVID-19.
- John Daly withdrew due to health concerns.
- Vijay Singh withdrew due to injury.

=== 2. Recent winners of the Masters Tournament ===
Winners of the last five Masters Tournaments:

- Sergio García (10)
- Patrick Reed (9,10,11)
- Jordan Spieth (3,4,7,9,10)
- Danny Willett

=== 3. Recent winners of the U.S. Open ===
Winners of the last five U.S. Open Championships:

- Dustin Johnson (7,9,10,11)
- Gary Woodland (7,9,11)

=== 4. Recent winners of The Open Championship ===
Winners of the last five Open Championships:

- Zach Johnson
- Shane Lowry (7,9,11)
- Henrik Stenson (10)
- Francesco Molinari (10) did not play.

=== 5. Recent winners of The Players Championship ===
Winners of the last three Players Championships:

- Kim Si-woo
- Webb Simpson (9,10,11)

=== 6. Winner of the Senior PGA Championship in 2019 ===
Winner of the 2019 Senior PGA Championship:

- Ken Tanigawa

=== 7. Leading finishers in the previous PGA Championship ===
Top 15 and ties in the 2019 PGA Championship:

- Patrick Cantlay (9,11)
- Jazz Janewattananond
- Kang Sung-hoon (9)
- Matt Kuchar (9)
- Luke List
- Chez Reavie (9,11)
- Adam Scott (9,11)
- Erik van Rooyen
- Matt Wallace

=== 8. Leading PGA professionals ===
Top 20 in the 2019 PGA Professional Player of the Year Standings: (Note: Criteria changed following cancellation of the 2020 PGA Professional Championship; originally set to be the top 20 players in that tournament.)

- Michael Auterson
- Danny Balin
- Alex Beach
- Rich Berberian Jr.
- Justin Bertsch
- Jason Caron
- Ben Cook
- Judd Gibb
- Jeff Hart
- Marty Jertson
- Zach J. Johnson
- Alex Knoll
- Rob Labritz
- David Muttitt
- John O'Leary
- Rod Perry
- Jeff Roth
- Bob Sowards
- Ryan Vermeer
- Shawn Warren

=== 9. Leading money winners on the PGA Tour ===
Top 70 in the PGA Championship Points standings (based on official PGA Tour money earned, calculated from the 2019 AT&T Byron Nelson to the 2020 3M Open):

- An Byeong-hun
- Abraham Ancer
- Daniel Berger (11)
- Cameron Champ (11)
- Corey Conners
- Joel Dahmen
- Bryson DeChambeau (10,11)
- Tyler Duncan (11)
- Harris English
- Tony Finau (10)
- Matt Fitzpatrick
- Tommy Fleetwood
- Dylan Frittelli (11)
- Lanto Griffin (11)
- Adam Hadwin
- Brian Harman
- Tyrrell Hatton (10,11)
- Tom Hoge
- Billy Horschel
- Viktor Hovland (11)
- Mackenzie Hughes
- Im Sung-jae (11)
- Kevin Kisner
- Andrew Landry (11)
- Nate Lashley (11)
- Danny Lee
- Marc Leishman (11)
- Adam Long
- Hideki Matsuyama
- Collin Morikawa (11)
- Sebastián Muñoz (11)
- Kevin Na (11)
- Joaquín Niemann (11)
- Louis Oosthuizen
- Carlos Ortiz
- Ryan Palmer
- Scott Piercy
- J. T. Poston (11)
- Jon Rahm (10,11)
- Justin Rose (10)
- Rory Sabbatini
- Xander Schauffele
- Scottie Scheffler
- Cameron Smith (11)
- Brandt Snedeker
- Brendan Steele
- Sepp Straka
- Kevin Streelman
- Nick Taylor (11)
- Michael Thompson (11)
- Brendon Todd (11)
- Matthew Wolff (11)
- Charles Howell III withdrew due to injury.
- Vaughn Taylor withdrew due to injury.

=== 10. Playing members of the Ryder Cup teams in 2018 ===
Playing members of the United States and European 2018 Ryder Cup teams ranked within the top 100 of the Official World Golf Ranking as of July 27, 2020:

- Paul Casey
- Rickie Fowler
- Ian Poulter
- Bubba Watson
- Alex Norén (115) and Thorbjørn Olesen (207) were ranked outside the top 100; Norén was later added to the field as the 12th and final alternate.

=== 11. Tournaments winners on the PGA Tour ===
Winners of tournaments co-sponsored or approved by the PGA Tour since the 2019 PGA Championship:

- Jim Herman
- Richy Werenski

=== 12. PGA of America invitees not included in the categories above ===
PGA of America invitees not included in the categories above: (Note: Invitees usually include all players ranked within the top 100 of the Official World Golf Ranking.)

- Christiaan Bezuidenhout
- Rafa Cabrera-Bello
- Jorge Campillo
- Jim Furyk
- Lucas Glover
- Benjamin Hébert
- Lucas Herbert
- Max Homa
- Ryo Ishikawa
- Matt Jones
- Chan Kim
- Tom Kim
- Marcus Kinhult
- Kurt Kitayama
- Jason Kokrak
- Tom Lewis
- Li Haotong
- Mike Lorenzo-Vera
- Joost Luiten
- Robert MacIntyre
- Graeme McDowell
- Keith Mitchell
- Shaun Norris
- Pan Cheng-tsung
- Victor Perez
- Andrew Putnam
- Matthias Schwab
- Charl Schwartzel
- Steve Stricker
- Bernd Wiesberger
- Shugo Imahira, ranked inside the top-100 in the Official World Golf Ranking, would have been an expected invitee but did not play.
- Eddie Pepperell, Thomas Pieters and Lee Westwood appeared on a list of players expected to compete, released by the PGA of America on July 21, but announced that they would not play.
- Paul Waring withdrew due to a back injury.
- J. B. Holmes withdrew due to a shoulder injury.
- Branden Grace withdrew after testing positive for COVID-19 at the Barracuda Championship.

=== 13. Leading money winners on the PGA Tour (additional) ===
Players outside the top 70 in PGA Championship Points (per category 9) to complete the field:

- Mark Hubbard
- Doc Redman
- Cameron Tringale

=== Alternates ===
Alternates (per category 13):

1. Harold Varner III (80th in standings) – replaced Thomas Pieters
2. Troy Merritt (82) – replaced Pádraig Harrington
3. Talor Gooch (85) – replaced Francesco Molinari
4. Russell Henley (87) – replaced Paul Waring
5. Wyndham Clark (89) – replaced J. B. Holmes
6. Brian Stuard (91) – replaced Charles Howell III
7. Bud Cauley (92) – replaced Branden Grace
8. ~~Ryan Moore~~ (93) – took spot reserved for winner of the WGC-FedEx St. Jude Invitational, but did not play due to scheduling issues
9. Denny McCarthy (95) – replaced John Daly
10. Emiliano Grillo (96) – replaced Vijay Singh
11. Zhang Xinjun (97) – replaced Ryan Moore
12. Alex Norén (99) – replaced Vaughn Taylor
