= 2020 PGA Championship =

Tournament information
- Dates: August 6–9, 2020
- Location: San Francisco, California; 37.724°N 122.493°W
- Course: TPC Harding Park
- Organized by: PGA of America
- Tours: PGA Tour; European Tour; Japan Golf Tour

Statistics
- Par: 70
- Length: 7,234 yards (6,615 m)
- Field: 156 players, 79 after cut
- Cut: 141 (+1)
- Prize fund: $11,000,000 €8,261,591
- Winner's share: $1,980,000 €1,667,086

Champion
- (United States) Collin Morikawa
- 267 (−13)
- Location in the United States Location in California Location in the San Francisco Bay Area

The 2020 PGA Championship was the 102nd edition of the PGA Championship, and the first of golf's three major championships played in 2020. It was held August 6–9 at TPC Harding Park in San Francisco, California, having originally been scheduled for May 14–17. Due to the COVID-19 pandemic, it was the first major played in over a year, and had no spectators in attendance. It was the first major held at Harding Park, which had previously hosted World Golf Championship events in 2005 and 2015, and the 2009 Presidents Cup.

In his PGA Championship debut, and second major appearance, Collin Morikawa won by two strokes ahead of runners-up Paul Casey and Dustin Johnson. Multiple players competed for the lead in the final round, and it was only after a birdie on the 14th, and an eagle on the short par-4 16th, that Morikawa was able to break away from the field. At age 23, he became the third youngest PGA Championship winner since World War II, behind Rory McIlroy and Jack Nicklaus, and rose from 12th to 5th in the Official World Golf Ranking. Morikawa also set a new PGA Championship scoring record for the final 36 holes with 129 strokes (65-64).

Casey's second place was his best finish in his 64 career major starts, the most by any player since 2002 without a victory. Johnson repeated his second place standing from the previous edition. Brooks Koepka entered the tournament as two-time defending champion and looking to become the second player after Walter Hagen to win three straight titles; tied for fourth place after round three, and only two shots behind the leader, he was expected to challenge for the title, but struggled in the final round and finished in a tie for 29th place. The top three players in the world rankings heading into the tournament were Justin Thomas (winner of a WGC event the previous week), Jon Rahm, and Rory McIlroy, but none of them were able to contend for the title.

== Venue ==
This was the first major championship held at Harding Park. It was also the first PGA Championship in the Western United States since 1998 at Sahalee Country Club near Seattle, Washington, and the first in California since 1995 at Riviera Country Club in Los Angeles.

Harding Park had previously held the 2015 WGC-Match Play Championship, won by Rory McIlroy, the 2009 Presidents Cup won by the United States, and the 2005 WGC-American Express Championship won by Tiger Woods.

Before the COVID-19 pandemic up to 40,000 spectators per day had been expected to attend.

=== Course layout ===
Hole	Yards	Par	Hole	Yards	Par
1	393	4	10	562	5
2	466	4	11	200	3
3	185	3	12	494	4
4	607	5	13	472	4
5	436	4	14	470	4
6	472	4	15	401	4
7	340	4	16	336	4
8	251	3	17	171	3
9	515	4	18	463	4
Out	3,665	35	In	3,569	35
Source:		Total		7,234	70

== Field ==
The PGA Championship field is regarded as one of the strongest in professional golf, with the highest strength of field rating of the year according to the Official World Golf Ranking, including almost all of the top one hundred players in the rankings. A number of qualification criteria were used to determine the field, including past PGA champions, recent major winners, top finishers in the 2019 PGA Championship, Ryder Cup players, tournament and leading money winners on the PGA Tour, and twenty PGA club or teaching professionals. The PGA of America also issue invitations to players outside of these criteria, which is generally seen to include the top one hundred in the world rankings.

Seventeen former PGA champions were in the field, including two-time defending champion Brooks Koepka, who was aiming to become the second player to win three in a row after Walter Hagen who won four in a row from 1924 to 1927, world number one Justin Thomas, number three Rory McIlroy, and four-time champion Tiger Woods. Among the former champions not to play were Yang Yong-eun, Pádraig Harrington, John Daly and Vijay Singh, who withdrew due to various concerns about the COVID-19 pandemic, health and injury. Francesco Molinari, winner of the 2018 Open Championship, also withdrew.

Following the cancellation of the 2020 PGA Professional Championship the qualification criteria for PGA club professionals was changed, and determined based on the top 20 in the 2019 PGA Professional Player of the Year Standings; they included 60-year-old Jeff Hart in his fourth PGA Championship, and 62-year old Jeff Roth in his sixth. None of the club professionals made the cut.

The field of 156 was completed by PGA of America invitees followed by leading money winners on the PGA Tour since the 2019 championship. Among the invitees was Li Haotong, one of few from outside the top 100 in the world rankings; he went on to lead the championship by two strokes at the halfway stage, before finishing in a tie for seventeenth place. Several players withdrew from the championship, with eleven alternates gaining a place as a result (one alternate, Ryan Moore, also withdrew). Among the withdrawals were leading European players Lee Westwood and Eddie Pepperell who, like Harrington, cited concerns surrounding the COVID-19 pandemic and traveling to the United States.

The last player to qualify was Richy Werenski, who gained his place by winning the Barracuda Championship the week prior to the PGA Championship, and the final player to take their place in the field was twelfth alternate Alex Norén, who had missed out on automatic qualification as a member of the European Ryder Cup team in 2018 having dropped out of the top 100 in the world rankings.

== Weather ==
- Thursday: Partly cloudy. High of 63 °F (17 °C). Wind W 10-15 mph , with gusts to 20 mph. Conditions windier for afternoon starters.
- Friday: Partly cloudy. High of 63 °F (17 °C). Wind WSW 10-15 mph , with gusts to 25 mph.
- Saturday: Mostly Cloudy. High of 61 °F (16 °C). Wind WSW 10-15 mph , with gusts to 20 mph.
- Sunday: Mostly cloudy. High of 63 °F (17 °C). Wind WSW 10-15 mph , with gusts to 20 mph.

== Round summaries ==
=== First round ===
Thursday, August 6, 2020

Jason Day, the 2015 champion, opened the tournament with a bogey-free round of 65 (five under par). He was joined at the top of the leaderboard by Brendon Todd, who was playing in his first PGA Championship in five years after falling to as low as 2,043rd in the world rankings two years earlier. Brooks Koepka, looking to become the first player in 93 years to win the PGA Championship for the third straight year, was one of nine players tied for third place at four under par; former major champions Zach Johnson, Martin Kaymer and Justin Rose were also in the group alongside Koepka.

Bryson DeChambeau reached four under through ten holes, but dropped strokes over his last eight holes to finish at two under par. On the same score was 15-time major champion, and four-time PGA champion, Tiger Woods, who was playing alongside world number one Justin Thomas (one over par) and Rory McIlroy (even par).

The scoring average for the first round was 71.12, the lowest for an opening-round in PGA Championship history. Todd was the only player in the top 10 to play in the windier afternoon conditions.

Place	Player	Score	To par
T1	(Australia) Jason Day	65	−5
T1	(United States) Brendon Todd	65	−5
T3	(United States) Bud Cauley	66	−4
T3	(United States) Zach Johnson	66	−4
T3	(Germany) Martin Kaymer	66	−4
T3	(United States) Brooks Koepka	66	−4
T3	(France) Mike Lorenzo-Vera	66	−4
T3	(England) Justin Rose	66	−4
T3	(United States) Xander Schauffele	66	−4
T3	(United States) Scottie Scheffler	66	−4
T3	(United States) Brendan Steele	66	−4

=== Second round ===
Friday, August 7, 2020

Li Haotong, the 114th-ranked player in the world, shot a bogey-free round of 65 (five under par) to take a two stroke lead after 36 holes. Li became the first player from China to lead a major championship after any round. The lowest rounds of the day came from Tommy Fleetwood and Cameron Champ, who returned six under par rounds of 64. Fleetwood finished in a group of six players tied for second place that included two-time defending champion Brooks Koepka, 2015 champion Jason Day and 2013 U.S. Open champion Justin Rose. Champ ended the day a further stroke behind, in a tie for eighth place with Paul Casey and Brendon Todd.

The cut came at one over par, with 79 players making it through to the final two rounds over the weekend. Among those who missed the cut were Martin Kaymer and Zach Johnson, who were tied for third place after the opening round; Jim Furyk and Richy Werenski, who had both won tournaments the previous week; and Rickie Fowler, who whiffed a short putt on his sixteenth hole of the day and went on to finish just one stroke outside the cut-line, ending a run of 14 cuts made in major championships.

Place	Player	Score	To par
1	(China) Li Haotong	67-65=132	−8
T2	(United States) Daniel Berger	67-67=134	−6
T2	(Australia) Jason Day	65-69=134	−6
T2	(England) Tommy Fleetwood	70-64=134	−6
T2	(United States) Brooks Koepka	66-68=134	−6
T2	(France) Mike Lorenzo-Vera	66-68=134	−6
T2	(England) Justin Rose	66-68=134	−6
T8	(England) Paul Casey	68-67=135	−5
T8	(United States) Cameron Champ	71-64=135	−5
T8	(United States) Brendon Todd	65-70=135	−5

=== Third round ===
Saturday, August 8, 2020

Dustin Johnson returned a five under par round of 65, the joint-lowest round of the day which included a career high eight birdies for a round in a major championship, to take the lead at nine under par. Scottie Scheffler and Collin Morikawa matched Johnson's score for the day to also make their way into the top five. Scheffler made three straight birdies on holes 15, 16 and 17 to get into a tie for second place with Cameron Champ, one stroke behind Johnson. Morikawa finished a further stroke behind alongside Paul Casey and Brooks Koepka, who was two under par for his round and tied for the lead before making three straight bogeys on the back nine; he rebounded with birdies on two of his final three holes to get back near the top of the leaderboard.

Six players finished the day tied for seventh place, three strokes off the lead. They were first round leader Jason Day, Daniel Berger, Justin Rose, Tommy Fleetwood, Tony Finau and Bryson DeChambeau. Overnight leader Li Haotong was still at the head of the field through twelve holes; he then made a double-bogey on the 13th hole after losing his ball in the trees and two further bogeys to return a three over par round of 73 and finish in a tie for 13th place, four strokes off the lead.

Seventeen players were within four shots of the lead going into the final round, the most at the PGA Championship since 1993.

Place	Player	Score	To par
1	(United States) Dustin Johnson	69-67-65=201	−9
T2	(United States) Cameron Champ	71-64-67=202	−8
T2	(United States) Scottie Scheffler	66-71-65=202	−8
T4	(England) Paul Casey	68-67-68=203	−7
T4	(United States) Brooks Koepka	66-68-69=203	−7
T4	(United States) Collin Morikawa	69-69-65=203	−7
T7	(United States) Daniel Berger	67-67-70=204	−6
T7	(Australia) Jason Day	65-69-70=204	−6
T7	(United States) Bryson DeChambeau	68-70-66=204	−6
T7	(United States) Tony Finau	67-70-67=204	−6
T7	(England) Tommy Fleetwood	70-64-70=204	−6
T7	(England) Justin Rose	66-68-70=204	−6

=== Final round ===
Sunday, August 9, 2020

With the last groups all playing the final nine holes, seven players were tied for the lead at 10 under par – Dustin Johnson, Paul Casey, Scottie Scheffler, Collin Morikawa, Tony Finau, Jason Day and Matthew Wolff, who held the lead in the clubhouse. Morikawa, making his PGA Championship debut, was the first to reach 11 under par with a chip-in for birdie from 54 feet off the front of the green at the 14th hole. He was soon joined by Casey, with a birdie at the short par-4 16th hole. Playing in the group behind Casey, Morikawa found the green with his tee shot at the 16th and holed his putt from seven feet for eagle to open up a two stroke lead. He parred the final two holes for a round of 64 (six under par) and finished at 13 under par for the tournament, two ahead of Casey who also finished with two pars for a round of 66 (four under par).

Johnson, the 54-hole leader, was even par for his round through 15 holes before chipping in for birdie at the 16th and holing a 17-foot birdie putt at the 18th to finish at 11 under par, alongside Casey and two behind Morikawa. It was Johnson's fifth runner-up finish in a major and second consecutive second-place at the PGA Championship.

Bryson DeChambeau birdied four of his first seven holes to jump into a tie for the lead, before consecutive bogeys on the 8th and 9th holes saw him drop back; he made two more birdies on the back nine for a round of 66 and finished tied for fourth, his first top-10 in a major championship. Wolff, playing in his first major, shared fourth place, having held the clubhouse lead at 10 under par after a round of 65. Day, Finau and Scheffler also finished tied for fourth place. Brooks Koepka, attempting to become the first player since Walter Hagen to win three straight PGA Championships, began the day two shots back but was four over par for the first nine holes and dropped out of contention; he closed with a round of 74, the second-worst of anyone in the field, to tie for 29th place.

Morikawa's score of 129 on the weekend was a new PGA Championship record, one shot better than Tiger Woods in 2018. His final-round score of 64 tied Steve Elkington in 1995 for best by a champion. He was also the ninth player in PGA Championship history to win the tournament at their first attempt, the most recent being Keegan Bradley in 2011.

==== Final leaderboard ====
Champion
(c) = past champion

Note: Top 15 and ties qualify for the 2021 PGA Championship; top 4 and ties qualify for the 2021 Masters Tournament

Place	Player	Score	To par	Money ($)
1	(United States) Collin Morikawa	69-69-65-64=267	−13	1,980,000
T2	(England) Paul Casey	68-67-68-66=269	−11	968,000
T2	(United States) Dustin Johnson	69-67-65-68=269	−11	968,000
T4	(Australia) Jason Day (c)	65-69-70-66=270	−10	404,350
T4	(United States) Bryson DeChambeau	68-70-66-66=270	−10	404,350
T4	(United States) Tony Finau	67-70-67-66=270	−10	404,350
T4	(United States) Scottie Scheffler	66-71-65-68=270	−10	404,350
T4	(United States) Matthew Wolff	69-68-68-65=270	−10	404,350
9	(England) Justin Rose	66-68-70-67=271	−9	295,600
T10	(United States) Cameron Champ	71-64-67-70=272	−8	252,123
T10	(United States) Joel Dahmen	69-68-68-67=272	−8	252,123
T10	(United States) Xander Schauffele	66-70-69-67=272	−8	252,123

Leaderboard below the top 10
Place	Player	Score	To par	Money ($)
T13	(United States) Daniel Berger	67-67-70-69=273	−7	192,208
T13	(South Korea) Kim Si-woo	69-68-68-68=273	−7	192,208
T13	(Spain) Jon Rahm	70-69-68-66=273	−7	192,208
T13	(United States) Patrick Reed	68-70-69-66=273	−7	192,208
T17	(China) Li Haotong	67-65-73-69=274	−6	156,500
T17	(United States) Brendon Todd	65-70-72-67=274	−6	156,500
T19	(United States) Harris English	69-71-69-66=275	−5	134,000
T19	(United States) Lanto Griffin	68-68-71-68=275	−5	134,000
T19	(United States) Kevin Kisner	67-73-68-67=275	−5	134,000
T22	(South Korea) An Byeong-hun	72-69-71-64=276	−4	94,571
T22	(Japan) Hideki Matsuyama	70-67-69-70=276	−4	94,571
T22	(Sweden) Alex Norén	67-69-73-67=276	−4	94,571
T22	(France) Victor Perez	70-69-69-68=276	−4	94,571
T22	(England) Ian Poulter	73-68-66-69=276	−4	94,571
T22	(Australia) Adam Scott	68-70-70-68=276	−4	94,571
T22	(United States) Brendan Steele	66-71-72-67=276	−4	94,571
T29	(England) Tommy Fleetwood	70-64-70-73=277	−3	69,500
T29	(United States) Brooks Koepka (c)	66-68-69-74=277	−3	69,500
T29	(United States) Doc Redman	73-67-70-67=277	−3	69,500
T29	(United States) Harold Varner III	72-66-69-70=277	−3	69,500
T33	(South Africa) Dylan Frittelli	70-67-70-71=278	−2	57,500
T33	(Norway) Viktor Hovland	68-71-73-66=278	−2	57,500
T33	(Northern Ireland) Rory McIlroy (c)	70-69-71-68=278	−2	57,500
T33	(South Africa) Louis Oosthuizen	70-71-70-67=278	−2	57,500
T37	(United States) Bud Cauley	66-71-73-69=279	−1	45,000
T37	(United States) Russell Henley	71-69-71-68=279	−1	45,000
T37	(United States) Nate Lashley	69-70-70-70=279	−1	45,000
T37	(United States) Webb Simpson	71-68-68-72=279	−1	45,000
T37	(United States) Justin Thomas (c)	71-70-68-70=279	−1	45,000
T37	(United States) Tiger Woods (c)	68-72-72-67=279	−1	45,000
T43	(Mexico) Abraham Ancer	69-70-72-69=280	E	31,594
T43	(United States) Patrick Cantlay	73-68-66-73=280	E	31,594
T43	(United States) Billy Horschel	69-71-71-69=280	E	31,594
T43	(France) Mike Lorenzo-Vera	66-68-72-74=280	E	31,594
T43	(United States) Keith Mitchell	68-72-68-72=280	E	31,594
T43	(United States) Ryan Palmer	74-66-76-64=280	E	31,594
T43	(Australia) Cameron Smith	71-69-70-70=280	E	31,594
T43	(Austria) Bernd Wiesberger	68-68-70-74=280	E	31,594
T51	(United States) Mark Hubbard	70-71-70-70=281	+1	24,000
T51	(United States) Kurt Kitayama	68-72-70-71=281	+1	24,000
T51	(United States) Luke List	72-69-70-70=281	+1	24,000
T51	(United States) Adam Long	73-68-72-68=281	+1	24,000
T51	(Netherlands) Joost Luiten	71-68-73-69=281	+1	24,000
T51	(United States) Brandt Snedeker	72-66-72-71=281	+1	24,000
T51	(South Africa) Erik van Rooyen	71-70-74-66=281	+1	24,000
T58	(Canada) Adam Hadwin	68-71-70-73=282	+2	21,338
T58	(United States) Brian Harman	68-71-71-72=282	+2	21,338
T58	(United States) Tom Hoge	72-68-72-70=282	+2	21,338
T58	(Canada) Mackenzie Hughes	73-68-69-72=282	+2	21,338
T58	(United States) Denny McCarthy	70-69-70-73=282	+2	21,338
T58	(South Africa) Charl Schwartzel	73-68-68-73=282	+2	21,338
T58	(United States) Kevin Streelman	69-70-73-70=282	+2	21,338
T58	(United States) Gary Woodland	67-72-73-70=282	+2	21,338
T66	(Argentina) Emiliano Grillo	70-70-70-73=283	+3	20,000
T66	(Republic of Ireland) Shane Lowry	68-72-69-74=283	+3	20,000
T66	(Scotland) Robert MacIntyre	73-67-74-69=283	+3	20,000
T66	(Slovakia) Rory Sabbatini	71-70-72-70=283	+3	20,000
T66	(Austria) Sepp Straka	70-71-71-71=283	+3	20,000
T71	(New Zealand) Danny Lee	69-71-74-70=284	+4	19,350
T71	(United States) Phil Mickelson (c)	72-69-70-73=284	+4	19,350
T71	(United States) Jordan Spieth	73-68-76-67=284	+4	19,350
T71	(United States) Bubba Watson	70-71-73-70=284	+4	19,350
T75	(United States) J. T. Poston	67-74-75-70=286	+6	19,050
T75	(United States) Chez Reavie	71-70-75-70=286	+6	19,050
T77	(United States) Jim Herman	71-69-72-75=287	+7	18,850
T77	(England) Matt Wallace	71-70-74-72=287	+7	18,850
79	(South Korea) Kang Sung-hoon	70-71-76-73=290	+10	18,700
CUT	(South Africa) Christiaan Bezuidenhout	72-70=142	+2	
CUT	(United States) Jason Dufner (c)	70-72=142	+2	
CUT	(United States) Rickie Fowler	73-69=142	+2	
CUT	(United States) Jim Furyk	71-71=142	+2	
CUT	(United States) Talor Gooch	71-71=142	+2	
CUT	(Japan) Ryo Ishikawa	72-70=142	+2	
CUT	(United States) Zach Johnson	66-76=142	+2	
CUT	(United States) Chan Kim	72-70=142	+2	
CUT	(Australia) Marc Leishman	70-72=142	+2	
CUT	(South Africa) Shaun Norris	69-73=142	+2	
CUT	(Mexico) Carlos Ortiz	72-70=142	+2	
CUT	(Sweden) Henrik Stenson	70-72=142	+2	
CUT	(United States) Lucas Glover	71-72=143	+3	
CUT	(England) Tyrrell Hatton	72-71=143	+3	
CUT	(Australia) Lucas Herbert	73-70=143	+3	
CUT	(United States) Jason Kokrak	69-74=143	+3	
CUT	(United States) Matt Kuchar	71-72=143	+3	
CUT	(United States) Andrew Landry	74-69=143	+3	
CUT	(England) Tom Lewis	67-76=143	+3	
CUT	(Colombia) Sebastián Muñoz	71-72=143	+3	
CUT	(United States) Kevin Na	70-73=143	+3	
CUT	(United States) Steve Stricker	72-71=143	+3	
CUT	(United States) Michael Thompson	71-72=143	+3	
CUT	(United States) Richy Werenski	71-72=143	+3	
CUT	(China) Zhang Xinjun	72-71=143	+3	
CUT	(United States) Alex Beach	73-71=144	+4	
CUT	(United States) Wyndham Clark	71-73=144	+4	
CUT	(England) Matt Fitzpatrick	74-70=144	+4	
CUT	(South Korea) Im Sung-jae	73-71=144	+4	
CUT	(Chile) Joaquín Niemann	75-69=144	+4	
CUT	(Taiwan) Pan Cheng-tsung	72-72=144	+4	
CUT	(United States) Scott Piercy	70-74=144	+4	
CUT	(United States) Keegan Bradley (c)	73-72=145	+5	
CUT	(Canada) Corey Conners	69-76=145	+5	
CUT	(United States) Tyler Duncan	74-71=145	+5	
CUT	(United States) Max Homa	74-71=145	+5	
CUT	(Thailand) Jazz Janewattananond	74-71=145	+5	
CUT	(Australia) Matt Jones	70-75=145	+5	
CUT	(United States) Troy Merritt	73-72=145	+5	
CUT	(Austria) Matthias Schwab	69-76=145	+5	
CUT	(United States) Brian Stuard	72-73=145	+5	
CUT	(United States) Ben Cook	71-75=146	+6	
CUT	(Spain) Sergio García	73-73=146	+6	
CUT	(France) Benjamin Hébert	75-71=146	+6	
CUT	(Northern Ireland) Graeme McDowell	72-74=146	+6	
CUT	(United States) Andrew Putnam	73-73=146	+6	
CUT	(United States) Bob Sowards	71-75=146	+6	
CUT	(South Korea) Tom Kim	70-77=147	+7	
CUT	(United States) Rob Labritz	71-76=147	+7	
CUT	(United States) David Muttitt	72-75=147	+7	
CUT	(United States) Jimmy Walker (c)	73-74=147	+7	
CUT	(England) Danny Willett	75-72=147	+7	
CUT	(Spain) Rafa Cabrera-Bello	72-76=148	+8	
CUT	(United States) Jason Caron	76-72=148	+8	
CUT	(Germany) Martin Kaymer (c)	66-82=148	+8	
CUT	(United States) John O'Leary	75-73=148	+8	
CUT	(United States) Michael Auterson	75-74=149	+9	
CUT	(United States) Davis Love III (c)	73-76=149	+9	
CUT	(United States) Shaun Micheel (c)	72-77=149	+9	
CUT	(United States) Jeff Roth	74-75=149	+9	
CUT	(Canada) Nick Taylor	76-73=149	+9	
CUT	(United States) Danny Balin	74-76=150	+10	
CUT	(United States) Rich Berberian Jr.	76-74=150	+10	
CUT	(United States) Marty Jertson	74-76=150	+10	
CUT	(United States) Ryan Vermeer	79-71=150	+10	
CUT	(Sweden) Marcus Kinhult	74-77=151	+11	
CUT	(United States) Ken Tanigawa	78-73=151	+11	
CUT	(United States) Shawn Warren	78-73=151	+11	
CUT	(United States) Justin Bertsch	78-75=153	+13	
CUT	(Spain) Jorge Campillo	74-80=154	+14	
CUT	(United States) Jeff Hart	77-77=154	+14	
CUT	(United States) Rich Beem (c)	80-75=155	+15	
CUT	(United States) Rod Perry	75-81=156	+16	
CUT	(United States) Alex Knoll	77-80=157	+17	
CUT	(United States) Judd Gibb	77-84=161	+21	
CUT	(United States) Zach J. Johnson	82-79=161	+21	
DQ	(United States) Cameron Tringale	73-68=141	+1	

==== Scorecard ====
Final round

Hole	1	2	3	4	5	6	7	8	9	10	11	12	13	14	15	16	17	18
Par	4	4	3	5	4	4	4	3	4	5	3	4	4	4	4	4	3	4
(United States) Morikawa	−7	−7	−8	−9	−9	−9	−9	−9	−9	−10	−10	−10	−10	−11	−11	−13	−13	−13
(England) Casey	−7	−7	−7	−8	−9	−9	−9	−9	−9	−10	−10	−10	−9	−10	−10	−11	−11	−11
(United States) Johnson	−10	−10	−9	−10	−10	−10	−10	−10	−10	−10	−10	−10	−10	−9	−9	−10	−10	−11
(Australia) Day	−7	−7	−7	−7	−7	−7	−7	−7	−7	−8	−9	−9	−9	−10	−10	−10	−10	−10
(United States) DeChambeau	−7	−8	−8	−9	−9	−9	−10	−9	−8	−8	−8	−8	−8	−9	−9	−10	−10	−10
(United States) Finau	−7	−8	−8	−8	−8	−8	−8	−8	−8	−9	−9	−8	−9	−10	−10	−10	−10	−10
(United States) Scheffler	−9	−9	−9	−9	−9	−9	−9	−9	−9	−10	−10	−10	−9	−9	−9	−10	−10	−10
(United States) Wolff	−5	−5	−5	−5	−4	−4	−5	−6	−7	−9	−9	−9	−9	−8	−8	−9	−9	−10
(England) Rose	−6	−6	−6	−7	−7	−7	−7	−6	−6	−7	−8	−8	−6	−6	−7	−8	−8	−9
(United States) Champ	−8	−8	−8	−9	−9	−10	−10	−10	−8	−9	−9	−8	−8	−8	−7	−7	−8	−8
(United States) Dahmen	−4	−4	−4	−4	−4	−5	−5	−5	−5	−5	−6	−7	−7	−7	−7	−7	−7	−8
(United States) Schauffele	−5	−5	−5	−5	−6	−7	−7	−6	−7	−7	−6	−6	−7	−6	−7	−8	−8	−8
(United States) Koepka	−7	−6	−6	−6	−6	−6	−5	−4	−3	−3	−3	−4	−4	−4	−5	−4	−4	−3

Cumulative tournament scores, relative to par

Eagle	Birdie	Bogey	Double Bogey

== Media ==
ESPN and CBS had the media rights to the 2020 PGA Championship. This marked the first year of the new media rights deal signed in October 2018, replacing the old deal with TNT and CBS. In the UK and Ireland, Sky Sports broadcast the event.
