= 2018 PGA Championship =

2018 Golf Major in Town and Country, Missouri

Tournament information
- Dates: August 9–12, 2018
- Location: Town and Country, Missouri; 38.66°N 90.483°W
- Course: Bellerive Country Club
- Organized by: PGA of America
- Tours: PGA Tour; European Tour; Japan Golf Tour

Statistics
- Par: 70
- Length: 7,316 yards (6,690 m)
- Field: 156 players, 80 after cut
- Cut: 140 (E)
- Prize fund: $11,000,000 €9,500,693
- Winner's share: $1,980,000 €1,710,125

Champion
- (United States) Brooks Koepka
- 264 (−16)
- Location in the United States Location in Missouri

The 2018 PGA Championship was the 100th PGA Championship, held August 9–12 at Bellerive Country Club in Town and Country, Missouri, a suburb west of St. Louis. This was the second PGA Championship (1992) and third major (1965 U.S. Open) held at Bellerive. It was also scheduled to be the last held in the month of August (although the 2020 tournament would later be moved to August due to the COVID-19 pandemic). Just before the 2017 tournament, the PGA announced that the Championship would move to May in 2019.

Brooks Koepka won his third career major title, finishing two strokes ahead of runner-up Tiger Woods. Koepka's 72-hole total of 264 set a PGA Championship record.

== Media ==
The 2018 PGA Championship was the 35th overall and 28th straight PGA Championship to be televised by CBS, with first and second round coverage provided by Turner Sports for the 28th year. In the UK and Ireland, the Championship was being streamed online by Eleven Sports.

== Course layout ==
Hole	Yards	Par	Hole	Yards	Par
1	425	4	10	508	4
2	410	4	11	355	4
3	148	3	12	452	4
4	521	4	13	180	3
5	471	4	14	410	4
6	213	3	15	495	4
7	394	4	16	237	3
8	610	5	17	597	5
9	433	4	18	457	4
Out	3,625	35	In	3,691	35
Source:		Total		7,316	70

Lengths of the course for previous major championships:

- 7,148 yards (6,536 m), par 71 - 1992 PGA Championship
- 7,191 yards (6,575 m), par 70 - 1965 U.S. Open

== Field ==
The following qualification criteria were used to select the field. Each player is listed according to the first category by which he qualified with additional categories in which he qualified shown in parentheses.

1. All former winners of the PGA Championship

- Rich Beem
- Keegan Bradley (9)
- John Daly
- Jason Day (5,7,9,11)
- Jason Dufner (9)
- Pádraig Harrington
- Martin Kaymer (3,10)
- Davis Love III
- Rory McIlroy (4,9,10,11)
- Shaun Micheel
- Phil Mickelson (9,10,11)
- Vijay Singh
- Justin Thomas (7,9,11)
- Jimmy Walker (9,10)
- Tiger Woods (9)
- Yang Yong-eun
- The following former champions did not enter: Paul Azinger, Mark Brooks, Jack Burke Jr., Steve Elkington, Dow Finsterwald, Raymond Floyd, Al Geiberger, Wayne Grady, David Graham, Don January, John Mahaffey, Larry Nelson, Bobby Nichols, Jack Nicklaus, Gary Player, Nick Price, Jeff Sluman, Dave Stockton, Hal Sutton, David Toms, Lee Trevino, Bob Tway, Lanny Wadkins

2. Winners of the last five Masters Tournaments

- Sergio García (10)
- Patrick Reed (7,9,10,11)
- Jordan Spieth (3,4,9,10)
- Bubba Watson (9,11)
- Danny Willett (10)

3. Winners of the last five U.S. Open Championships

- Dustin Johnson (7,9,10,11)
- Brooks Koepka (7,9,10,11)

4. Winners of the last five Open Championships

- Zach Johnson (9,10)
- Francesco Molinari (7,9,11)
- Henrik Stenson (7,9,10,11)

5. Winners of the last three Players Championships

- Kim Si-woo (9)
- Webb Simpson (9,11)

6. Current Senior PGA Champion

- Paul Broadhurst

7. Top 15 and ties from the 2017 PGA Championship

- Scott Brown
- Paul Casey (9,11)
- Rickie Fowler (9,10)
- James Hahn
- Brian Harman (9)
- Kevin Kisner (9)
- Matt Kuchar (9,10)
- Marc Leishman (9,11)
- Hideki Matsuyama (9)
- Ryan Moore (9,10)
- Jordan Smith
- Chris Stroud
- Graham DeLaet and Louis Oosthuizen (9) did not play due to injury.

8. Top 20 in the 2018 PGA Professional Championship

- Danny Balin
- Rich Berberian Jr.
- Michael Block
- Matt Borchert
- Craig Bowden
- Matt Dobyns
- Jaysen Hansen
- Craig Hocknull
- Marty Jertson
- Zach J. Johnson
- Ben Kern
- Johan Kok
- Sean McCarty
- David Muttitt
- Jason Schmuhl
- Brian Smock
- Bob Sowards
- Omar Uresti
- Ryan Vermeer
- Shawn Warren

9. Top 70 leaders in official money standings from the 2017 WGC-Bridgestone Invitational and Barracuda Championship through the 2018 RBC Canadian Open

- An Byeong-hun
- Ryan Armour (11)
- Daniel Berger
- Rafa Cabrera-Bello (10)
- Patrick Cantlay (11)
- Kevin Chappell
- Austin Cook (11)
- Bryson DeChambeau (11)
- Tony Finau
- Tommy Fleetwood
- Brian Gay
- Emiliano Grillo
- Chesson Hadley
- Adam Hadwin
- Russell Henley
- Charley Hoffman
- J. B. Holmes (10)
- Billy Horschel (11)
- Beau Hossler
- Charles Howell III
- Kim Meen-whee
- Patton Kizzire (11)
- Andrew Landry (11)
- Luke List
- Kevin Na (11)
- Alex Norén
- Pat Perez (11)
- Scott Piercy (11)
- Ted Potter Jr. (11)
- Ian Poulter (11)
- Jon Rahm (11)
- Chez Reavie
- Justin Rose (10,11)
- Xander Schauffele (11)
- Ollie Schniederjans
- Charl Schwartzel
- Cameron Smith
- J. J. Spaun
- Kyle Stanley
- Brendan Steele (11)
- Jhonattan Vegas
- Aaron Wise (11)
- Gary Woodland (11)

10. Members of the United States and Europe 2016 Ryder Cup teams

- Matt Fitzpatrick
- Thomas Pieters
- Brandt Snedeker
- Andy Sullivan
- Chris Wood
- Lee Westwood did not play due to injury.

11. Winners of tournaments co-sponsored or approved by the PGA Tour since the 2017 PGA Championship

- Brice Garnett
- Michael Kim
- Satoshi Kodaira
- Troy Merritt
- Andrew Putnam

12. Special invitations

- Kiradech Aphibarnrat
- Alexander Björk
- Jorge Campillo
- Stewart Cink
- Paul Dunne
- Ross Fisher
- Ryan Fox
- Dylan Frittelli
- Jim Furyk
- Branden Grace
- Bill Haas
- Seungsu Han
- Justin Harding
- Tyrrell Hatton
- Yuta Ikeda
- Im Sung-jae
- Shugo Imahira
- Russell Knox
- Mikko Korhonen
- Anirban Lahiri
- Alexander Lévy
- Li Haotong
- Mike Lorenzo-Vera
- Jamie Lovemark
- Shane Lowry
- Yūsaku Miyazato
- Joaquín Niemann
- Thorbjørn Olesen
- Adrián Otaegui
- Eddie Pepperell
- Adam Scott
- Shubhankar Sharma
- Brandon Stone
- Julian Suri
- Ryuko Tokimatsu
- Peter Uihlein
- Matt Wallace
- Nick Watney
- Thomas Bjørn did not play due to a back injury.

13. Players below 70th place in official money standings, to fill the field

Alternates (category 13)

1. Jason Kokrak (71st in standings; replaced Lee Westwood)
2. Chris Kirk (72, took spot reserved for WGC-Bridgestone Invitational winner)
3. Kevin Streelman (79, replaced Thomas Bjørn)
4. Kelly Kraft (80, replaced Louis Oosthuizen)

== Round summaries ==
=== First round ===
Thursday, August 9, 2018

Gary Woodland holed five birdies on the back nine to lead by one over Rickie Fowler. A total of 47 players ended the opening day under par.

Place	Player	Score	To par
1	(United States) Gary Woodland	64	−6
2	(United States) Rickie Fowler	65	−5
T3	(South Africa) Brandon Stone	66	−4
T3	(United States) Zach Johnson	66	−4
T5	(United States) Stewart Cink	67	−3
T5	(United States) Austin Cook	67	−3
T5	(Australia) Jason Day	67	−3
T5	(United States) Brian Gay	67	−3
T5	(United States) Dustin Johnson	67	−3
T5	(United States) Kevin Kisner	67	−3
T5	(United States) Pat Perez	67	−3
T5	(Belgium) Thomas Pieters	67	−3
T5	(England) Ian Poulter	67	−3
T5	(England) Justin Rose	67	−3
T5	(United States) Ollie Schniederjans	67	−3

=== Second round ===
Friday, August 10, 2018

Play was suspended Friday afternoon at 3:35 pm due to dangerous weather with half of the field still on the course. Play was set to resume Saturday morning at 7 am local time with the third round to follow at about 11:15 am. Gary Woodland was the clubhouse leader at 130 (−10), which set a PGA Championship record for low 36-hole score. Two players, Brooks Koepka and Charl Schwartzel, shot record-tying rounds of 63.

Place	Player	Score	To par
1	(United States) Gary Woodland	64-66=130	−10
2	(United States) Kevin Kisner	67-64=131	−9
3	(United States) Brooks Koepka	69-63=132	−8
T4	(United States) Rickie Fowler	65 (−2 thru 10)	−7
T4	(United States) Dustin Johnson	67-66=133	−7
T4	(Belgium) Thomas Pieters	67-66=133	−7
T4	(South Africa) Charl Schwartzel	70-63=133	−7
8	(South Africa) Brandon Stone	66-68=134	−6
T9	(United States) Patrick Cantlay	68-67=135	−5
T9	(United States) Billy Horschel	68 (−3 thru 10)	−5
T9	(United States) Jason Kokrak	68-67=135	−5
T9	(Italy) Francesco Molinari	68-67=135	−5
T9	(United States) Pat Perez	67 (−2 thru 9)	−5
T9	(Spain) Jon Rahm	68-67=135	−5
T9	(Australia) Adam Scott	70-65=135	−5

Saturday, August 11, 2018

Place	Player	Score	To par
1	(United States) Gary Woodland	64-66=130	−10
2	(United States) Kevin Kisner	67-64=131	−9
T3	(United States) Rickie Fowler	65-67=132	−8
T3	(United States) Brooks Koepka	69-63=132	−8
T5	(United States) Dustin Johnson	67-66=133	−7
T5	(Republic of Ireland) Shane Lowry	69-64=133	−7
T5	(Belgium) Thomas Pieters	67-66=133	−7
T5	(South Africa) Charl Schwartzel	70-63=133	−7
T9	(United States) Pat Perez	67-67=134	−6
T9	(South Africa) Brandon Stone	66-68=134	−6
T9	(United States) Justin Thomas	69-65=134	−6

=== Third round ===
Saturday, August 11, 2018

Brooks Koepka's 66 gave him a two-shot lead as he attempted to become the first player since Tiger Woods in 2000 to win both the U.S. Open and the PGA Championship in the same season.

Place	Player	Score	To par
1	(United States) Brooks Koepka	69-63-66=198	−12
2	(Australia) Adam Scott	70-65-65=200	−10
T3	(United States) Rickie Fowler	65-67-69=201	−9
T3	(Spain) Jon Rahm	68-67-66=201	−9
T3	(United States) Gary Woodland	64-66-71=201	−9
T6	(United States) Stewart Cink	67-69-66=202	−8
T6	(Australia) Jason Day	67-68-67=202	−8
T6	(Republic of Ireland) Shane Lowry	69-64-69=202	−8
T6	(South Africa) Charl Schwartzel	70-63-69=202	−8
T6	(United States) Justin Thomas	69-65-68=202	−8
T6	(United States) Tiger Woods	70-66-66=202	−8

=== Final round ===
Sunday, August 12, 2018

==== Summary ====
Brooks Koepka duplicated his Saturday score of 66 to win by two strokes ahead of runner-up Tiger Woods, who fired a 64 in the best final round of his career in a major. Koepka became the fifth American player to win three majors before the age of 29, joining Jack Nicklaus, Jordan Spieth, Tom Watson and Woods.

His 72-hole score of 264 set the PGA Championship record (previously 265 set by David Toms in 2001) and equaled the lowest total in major championship history (set by Henrik Stenson at the 2016 Open Championship).

==== Final leaderboard ====
Champion
Crystal Bowl winner (leading PGA Club Pro)
(c) = past champion

Note: Top 15 and ties qualify for the 2019 PGA Championship; top 4 and ties qualify for the 2019 Masters Tournament

Place	Player	Score	To par	Money ($)
1	(United States) Brooks Koepka	69-63-66-66=264	−16	1,980,000
2	(United States) Tiger Woods (c)	70-66-66-64=266	−14	1,188,000
3	(Australia) Adam Scott	70-65-65-67=267	−13	748,000
T4	(United States) Stewart Cink	67-69-66-67=269	−11	489,250
T4	(Spain) Jon Rahm	68-67-66-68=269	−11	489,250
T6	(Italy) Francesco Molinari	68-67-68-67=270	−10	334,713
T6	(Belgium) Thomas Pieters	67-66-71-66=270	−10	334,713
T6	(United States) Justin Thomas (c)	69-65-68-68=270	−10	334,713
T6	(United States) Gary Woodland	64-66-71-69=270	−10	334,713
T10	(Spain) Rafa Cabrera-Bello	70-68-69-64=271	−9	261,985
T10	(England) Tyrrell Hatton	71-67-69-64=271	−9	261,985

Leaderboard below the top 10
Place	Player	Score	To par	Money ($)
T12	(United States) Daniel Berger	73-65-66-68=272	−8	187,747
T12	(United States) Rickie Fowler	65-67-69-71=272	−8	187,747
T12	(United States) Kevin Kisner	67-64-72-69=272	−8	187,747
T12	(Republic of Ireland) Shane Lowry	69-64-69-70=272	−8	187,747
T12	(United States) Chez Reavie	71-68-67-66=272	−8	187,747
T12	(United States) Jordan Spieth	71-66-69-66=272	−8	187,747
T12	(South Africa) Brandon Stone	66-68-70-68=272	−8	187,747
T19	(Australia) Jason Day (c)	67-68-67-71=273	−7	113,125
T19	(United States) Zach Johnson	66-70-71-66=273	−7	113,125
T19	(United States) Jason Kokrak	68-67-71-67=273	−7	113,125
T19	(United States) Kevin Na	70-69-68-66=273	−7	113,125
T19	(England) Justin Rose	67-69-69-68=273	−7	113,125
T19	(United States) Webb Simpson	68-68-68-69=273	−7	113,125
T19	(United States) Julian Suri	69-66-68-70=273	−7	113,125
T19	(England) Matt Wallace	71-66-68-68=273	−7	113,125
T27	(United States) Patrick Cantlay	68-67-70-69=274	−6	76,000
T27	(New Zealand) Ryan Fox	68-70-68-68=274	−6	76,000
T27	(South Africa) Branden Grace	68-70-68-68=274	−6	76,000
T27	(United States) Dustin Johnson	67-66-72-69=274	−6	76,000
T31	(South Africa) Dylan Frittelli	73-67-67-68=275	−5	63,500
T31	(Argentina) Emiliano Grillo	69-67-69-70=275	−5	63,500
T31	(United States) Chris Kirk	68-70-68-69=275	−5	63,500
T31	(England) Ian Poulter	67-70-68-70=275	−5	63,500
T35	(England) Tommy Fleetwood	69-70-69-68=276	−4	48,429
T35	(United States) Billy Horschel	68-69-69-70=276	−4	48,429
T35	(Scotland) Russell Knox	71-68-69-68=276	−4	48,429
T35	(Japan) Hideki Matsuyama	68-69-73-66=276	−4	48,429
T35	(United States) Pat Perez	67-67-70-72=276	−4	48,429
T35	(United States) Xander Schauffele	70-67-67-72=276	−4	48,429
T35	(United States) J. J. Spaun	69-68-72-67=276	−4	48,429
T42	(United States) Keegan Bradley (c)	69-68-71-69=277	−3	33,281
T42	(United States) Tony Finau	74-66-69-68=277	−3	33,281
T42	(South Korea) Im Sung-jae	71-67-71-68=277	−3	33,281
T42	(Germany) Martin Kaymer (c)	71-69-67-70=277	−3	33,281
T42	(United States) Ben Kern	71-69-67-70=277	−3	33,281
T42	(South Africa) Charl Schwartzel	70-63-69-75=277	−3	33,281
T42	(United States) Brandt Snedeker	72-67-69-69=277	−3	33,281
T42	(United States) Jimmy Walker (c)	69-70-69-69=277	−3	33,281
T50	(United States) Austin Cook	67-72-69-70=278	−2	24,833
T50	(United States) Brice Garnett	71-68-69-70=278	−2	24,833
T50	(United States) Seungsu Han	74-66-66-72=278	−2	24,833
T50	(United States) Russell Henley	74-65-71-68=278	−2	24,833
T50	(United States) Andrew Landry	73-65-69-71=278	−2	24,833
T50	(Northern Ireland) Rory McIlroy (c)	70-67-71-70=278	−2	24,833
T56	(South Korea) An Byeong-hun	70-70-69-70=279	−1	22,567
T56	(Denmark) Thorbjørn Olesen	70-68-73-68=279	−1	22,567
T56	(Australia) Cameron Smith	74-66-73-66=279	−1	22,567
T59	(Japan) Satoshi Kodaira	71-68-69-72=280	E	21,317
T59	(United States) Ryan Moore	69-70-68-73=280	E	21,317
T59	(England) Eddie Pepperell	72-66-67-75=280	E	21,317
T59	(United States) Andrew Putnam	68-69-72-71=280	E	21,317
T59	(United States) Ollie Schniederjans	67-71-72-70=280	E	21,317
T59	(Venezuela) Jhonattan Vegas	70-70-70-70=280	E	21,317
T65	(United States) Kevin Chappell	69-71-70-71=281	+1	20,100
T65	(England) Ross Fisher	68-69-73-71=281	+1	20,100
T65	(Japan) Yuta Ikeda	68-69-71-73=281	+1	20,100
T65	(France) Mike Lorenzo-Vera	73-65-70-73=281	+1	20,100
T65	(Spain) Adrián Otaegui	73-67-69-72=281	+1	20,100
T65	(United States) Chris Stroud	69-70-76-66=281	+1	20,100
T71	(United States) Jim Furyk	69-71-71-71=282	+2	19,200
T71	(United States) Brian Harman	72-68-71-71=282	+2	19,200
T71	(United States) Charles Howell III	74-66-72-70=282	+2	19,200
T71	(Australia) Marc Leishman	68-71-72-71=282	+2	19,200
T71	(Chile) Joaquín Niemann	68-71-71-72=282	+2	19,200
T71	(United States) Ted Potter Jr.	74-66-68-74=282	+2	19,200
T71	(United States) Nick Watney	75-65-70-72=282	+2	19,200
78	(Fiji) Vijay Singh (c)	71-69-71-72=283	+3	18,800
79	(United States) Brian Gay	67-73-75-72=287	+7	18,700
80	(United States) Scott Brown	72-68-74-75=289	+9	18,600
CUT	(United States) Bryson DeChambeau	71-70=141	+1	
CUT	(Spain) Sergio García	70-71=141	+1	
CUT	(Republic of Ireland) Pádraig Harrington (c)	71-70=141	+1	
CUT	(United States) J. B. Holmes	73-68=141	+1	
CUT	(Japan) Shugo Imahira	72-69=141	+1	
CUT	(United States) Patton Kizzire	72-69=141	+1	
CUT	(United States) Matt Kuchar	71-70=141	+1	
CUT	(United States) Luke List	71-70=141	+1	
CUT	(United States) Davis Love III (c)	75-66=141	+1	
CUT	(United States) Troy Merritt	71-70=141	+1	
CUT	(United States) Kyle Stanley	68-73=141	+1	
CUT	(United States) Brendan Steele	73-68=141	+1	
CUT	(United States) Ryan Armour	69-73=142	+2	
CUT	(England) Matt Fitzpatrick	72-70=142	+2	
CUT	(United States) Bill Haas	72-70=142	+2	
CUT	(South Africa) Justin Harding	72-70=142	+2	
CUT	(South Korea) Kim Meen-whee	75-67=142	+2	
CUT	(United States) Shaun Micheel (c)	73-69=142	+2	
CUT	(Sweden) Alex Norén	71-71=142	+2	
CUT	(England) Jordan Smith	74-68=142	+2	
CUT	(Sweden) Henrik Stenson	73-69=142	+2	
CUT	(United States) Kevin Streelman	72-70=142	+2	
CUT	(United States) Peter Uihlein	73-69=142	+2	
CUT	(United States) Rich Beem (c)	74-69=143	+3	
CUT	(United States) John Daly (c)	73-70=143	+3	
CUT	(Canada) Adam Hadwin	71-72=143	+3	
CUT	(United States) James Hahn	73-70=143	+3	
CUT	(United States) Charley Hoffman	72-71=143	+3	
CUT	(Finland) Mikko Korhonen	68-75=143	+3	
CUT	(India) Anirban Lahiri	70-73=143	+3	
CUT	(France) Alexander Lévy	76-67=143	+3	
CUT	(United States) Sean McCarty	74-69=143	+3	
CUT	(United States) Patrick Reed	72-71=143	+3	
CUT	(India) Shubhankar Sharma	69-74=143	+3	
CUT	(Thailand) Kiradech Aphibarnrat	75-69=144	+4	
CUT	(England) Paul Broadhurst	74-70=144	+4	
CUT	(United States) Jason Dufner (c)	72-72=144	+4	
CUT	(United States) Beau Hossler	73-71=144	+4	
CUT	(United States) Phil Mickelson (c)	73-71=144	+4	
CUT	(England) Andy Sullivan	75-69=144	+4	
CUT	(Japan) Ryuko Tokimatsu	73-71=144	+4	
CUT	(England) Danny Willett	73-71=144	+4	
CUT	(United States) Aaron Wise	76-68=144	+4	
CUT	(England) Chris Wood	70-74=144	+4	
CUT	(Sweden) Alexander Björk	72-73=145	+5	
CUT	(Australia) Craig Hocknull	72-73=145	+5	
CUT	(United States) Zach J. Johnson	76-69=145	+5	
CUT	(United States) Kelly Kraft	71-74=145	+5	
CUT	(Republic of Ireland) Paul Dunne	73-73=146	+6	
CUT	(United States) Jamie Lovemark	71-75=146	+6	
CUT	(United States) Scott Piercy	74-72=146	+6	
CUT	(United States) Ryan Vermeer	73-73=146	+6	
CUT	(United States) Danny Balin	72-75=147	+7	
CUT	(United States) Matt Dobyns	76-71=147	+7	
CUT	(United States) Jason Schmuhl	74-73=147	+7	
CUT	(South Korea) Yang Yong-eun (c)	73-74=147	+7	
CUT	(United States) Rich Berberian Jr.	74-74=148	+8	
CUT	(United States) Matt Borchert	74-74=148	+8	
CUT	(England) Paul Casey	75-73=148	+8	
CUT	(United States) Chesson Hadley	75-73=148	+8	
CUT	(United States) Omar Uresti	75-73=148	+8	
CUT	(United States) Shawn Warren	77-71=148	+8	
CUT	(United States) Bubba Watson	70-78=148	+8	
CUT	(United States) Craig Bowden	75-74=149	+9	
CUT	(South Korea) Kim Si-woo	72-77=149	+9	
CUT	(United States) Michael Block	75-75=150	+10	
CUT	(United States) Marty Jertson	76-74=150	+10	
CUT	(United States) Michael Kim	73-77=150	+10	
CUT	(United States) David Muttitt	81-69=150	+10	
CUT	(United States) Brian Smock	79-71=150	+10	
CUT	(United States) Jaysen Hansen	76-75=151	+11	
CUT	(South Africa) Johan Kok	78-73=151	+11	
CUT	(Spain) Jorge Campillo	78-74=152	+12	
CUT	(Japan) Yūsaku Miyazato	76-77=153	+13	
CUT	(United States) Bob Sowards	80-75=155	+15	
WD	(China) Li Haotong	71	+1	

==== Scorecard ====
Hole	1	2	3	4	5	6	7	8	9	10	11	12	13	14	15	16	17	18
Par	4	4	3	4	4	3	4	5	4	4	4	4	3	4	4	3	5	4
(United States) Koepka	−13	−13	−13	−12	−11	−11	−12	−13	−14	−14	−14	−14	−14	−14	−15	−16	−16	−16
(United States) Woods	−8	−9	−10	−10	−10	−9	−9	−10	−11	−11	−11	−12	−13	−12	−13	−13	−13	−14
(Australia) Scott	−9	−9	−9	−9	−9	−9	−10	−11	−11	−12	−12	−13	−14	−14	−14	−14	−14	−13
(United States) Cink	−8	−8	−9	−8	−7	−7	−8	−8	−8	−8	−8	−9	−10	−9	−9	−9	−10	−11
(Spain) Rahm	−9	−9	−9	−8	−8	−8	−9	−10	−10	−10	−10	−10	−10	−10	−10	−11	−10	−11
(Italy) Molinari	−7	−7	−7	−7	−7	−7	−7	−7	−8	−9	−9	−9	−9	−10	−10	−10	−10	−10
(Belgium) Pieters	−7	−7	−7	−7	−7	−7	−7	−8	−8	−8	−9	−9	−9	−10	−11	−12	−10	−10
(United States) Thomas	−9	−9	−9	−9	−10	−10	−11	−11	−10	−11	−12	−12	−12	−11	−11	−10	−10	−10
(United States) Woodland	−9	−9	−9	−8	−7	−7	−7	−8	−8	−7	−8	−9	−9	−10	−10	−10	−10	−10

Cumulative tournament scores, relative to par

Birdie	Bogey	Double bogey
