= 2019 PGA Championship =

Tournament information
- Dates: May 16–19, 2019
- Location: Farmingdale, New York; 40.742°N 73.455°W
- Courses: Bethpage State Park; Black Course
- Organized by: PGA of America
- Tours: PGA Tour; European Tour; Japan Golf Tour

Statistics
- Par: 70
- Length: 7,459 yards (6,821 m)
- Field: 156 players, 82 after cut
- Cut: 144 (+4)
- Prize fund: $11,000,000 €8,620,017
- Winner's share: $1,980,000 €1,551,603

Champion
- (United States) Brooks Koepka
- 272 (−8)
- Location in the United States Location in New York

The 2019 PGA Championship was the 101st edition of the PGA Championship, and the second of golf's four major championships in 2019, held May 16–19 at the Black Course in Bethpage State Park, Farmingdale, New York. This was the first edition under the new schedule in which the PGA Championship is the second major of the year, having previously been the final one for decades. It was the third major and first PGA Championship at Bethpage Black, which hosted U.S. Opens in 2002 and 2009, won by Tiger Woods and Lucas Glover, respectively.

Brooks Koepka won his second PGA Championship, and fourth major, by two strokes ahead of runner-up Dustin Johnson. By doing so he became first player to successfully defend both the PGA Championship and the U.S. Open in a career, and became fourth player to successfully defend two different majors in a career. At age 29 he became the only player currently under 30 to win at least four majors, and he returned to being ranked number one in the world. Johnson became the eighth player to have runner-ups in all four majors.

Koepka hit a joint record PGA Championship low score of 63 in the first round, and a 65 in the second, to have the lowest 36-hole score in major history, and the largest 36-hole PGA Championship lead (7 strokes) in PGA Championship history. He hit a level par 70 in the third round, to retain a 7 stroke lead going into the final day. He held a healthy lead until a late charge from Johnson brought him within one stroke, but a four over par 74 was enough to get Koepka over the line.

Given his recent win in the Masters, and his 2002 U.S. Open win at Bethpage, Tiger Woods had a lot of media attention leading into the tournament, but missed the cut. Given the length of the course, long hitters were expected to do well, and Koepka and Johnson were among the favorites. Rory McIlroy was also among the favorites but finished tied for eighth. After struggling recently for form, Jordan Spieth finished tied for third in his attempt to complete the career grand slam.

The leading PGA Club Pro, and winner of his second Crystal Bowl, was Rob Labritz. He finished tied for 60th at 10-over-par.

== Course layout ==
Hole	Yards	Par	Hole	Yards	Par
1	430	4	10	502	4
2	389	4	11	435	4
3	230	3	12	515	4
4	517	5	13	608	5
5	478	4	14	161	3
6	408	4	15	484	4
7	524	4	16	490	4
8	210	3	17	207	3
9	460	4	18	411	4
Out	3,646	35	In	3,813	35
Source:		Total		7,459	70

Lengths of the course for previous major championships:

- 7,426 yards (6,790 m), par 70 - 2009 U.S. Open
- 7,214 yards (6,596 m), par 70 - 2002 U.S. Open

== Field ==
The following qualification criteria were used to select the field. Each player is listed according to the first category by which he qualified with additional categories in which he qualified shown in parentheses. Dates when a qualifying category will be completely determined are indicated in italics.

1. All former winners of the PGA Championship

Rich Beem, Keegan Bradley (9,11), John Daly, Jason Day (9), Jason Dufner, Pádraig Harrington, Martin Kaymer (3), Brooks Koepka (3,7,9,10,11), Rory McIlroy (4,5,9,10,11), Shaun Micheel, Phil Mickelson (9,10,11), Jimmy Walker, Tiger Woods (2,7,9,10,11), Yang Yong-eun

- Davis Love III did not play.
- Vijay Singh did not play due to a back injury.
- Justin Thomas (7,9,10,11) did not play due to a wrist injury.
- The following former champions did not enter: Paul Azinger, Mark Brooks, Jack Burke Jr., Steve Elkington, Dow Finsterwald, Raymond Floyd, Al Geiberger, Wayne Grady, David Graham, Don January, John Mahaffey, Larry Nelson, Bobby Nichols, Jack Nicklaus, Gary Player, Nick Price, Jeff Sluman, Dave Stockton, Hal Sutton, David Toms, Lee Trevino, Bob Tway, Lanny Wadkins

2. Winners of the last five Masters Tournaments

Sergio García (9,10), Patrick Reed (9,10), Jordan Spieth (3,4,7,10), Danny Willett

3. Winners of the last five U.S. Open Championships

Dustin Johnson (9,10,11)

4. Winners of the last five Open Championships

Zach Johnson, Francesco Molinari (7,9,10,11), Henrik Stenson (10)

5. Winners of the last three Players Championships

Kim Si-woo (9), Webb Simpson (9,10,11)

6. Current Senior PGA Champion

- Due to the change in the date of the PGA Championship, which moves the PGA Championship prior to the same year's Senior PGA Championship (specifically the week before), this exemption was not used in 2019.

7. Top-15 and ties in the 2018 PGA Championship

Daniel Berger, Rafa Cabrera-Bello (9), Rickie Fowler (9,10,11), Tyrrell Hatton (9,10), Kevin Kisner (9,11), Shane Lowry, Thomas Pieters, Jon Rahm (9,10,11), Chez Reavie (9), Adam Scott (9), Brandon Stone, Gary Woodland (9)

- Stewart Cink (9) did not play due to a back injury.

8. Top-20 in the 2019 PGA Professional Championship

Danny Balin, Alex Beach, Rich Berberian Jr., Justin Bertsch, Craig Bowden, Jason Caron, Ben Cook, Stuart Deane, Andrew Filbert, Tyler Hall, Craig Hocknull, Marty Jertson, Rob Labritz, Brian Mackey, John O'Leary, Rod Perry, Casey Russell, Jeffrey Schmid, Cory Schneider, Ryan Vermeer

9. Top-70 leaders in official money standings from the 2018 Players Championship to the 2019 Wells Fargo Championship

An Byeong-hun, Abraham Ancer, Ryan Armour, Patrick Cantlay, Paul Casey (10,11), Corey Conners (11), Joel Dahmen, Bryson DeChambeau (10,11), Tony Finau (10), Matt Fitzpatrick, Tommy Fleetwood (10), Jim Furyk, Brian Gay, Lucas Glover, Branden Grace, Emiliano Grillo, Adam Hadwin, Charley Hoffman, J. B. Holmes (11), Max Homa (11), Billy Horschel, Charles Howell III (11), Im Sung-jae, Jason Kokrak, Matt Kuchar (11), Danny Lee, Marc Leishman (11), Hideki Matsuyama, Keith Mitchell (11), Ryan Moore, Kevin Na (11), Louis Oosthuizen, Ryan Palmer (11), Pan Cheng-tsung (11), Scott Piercy, Ian Poulter (10), Andrew Putnam (11), Justin Rose (10,11), Xander Schauffele (11), Cameron Smith, Brandt Snedeker (11), J. J. Spaun, Kyle Stanley, Kevin Tway (11), Harold Varner III, Jhonattan Vegas, Bubba Watson (10,11), Aaron Wise (11)

10. Members of the United States and European 2018 Ryder Cup teams

Alex Norén, Thorbjørn Olesen

11. Winners of tournaments co-sponsored or approved by the PGA Tour since the 2018 Players Championship

Cameron Champ, Kang Sung-hoon (13), Michael Kim, Adam Long, Graeme McDowell, Troy Merritt, Martin Trainer

12. The PGA of America reserves the right to invite additional players not included in the categories listed above

Kiradech Aphibarnrat, Lucas Bjerregaard, Alexander Björk, Sam Burns, Jorge Campillo, Ross Fisher, Ryan Fox, Dylan Frittelli, Chesson Hadley, Justin Harding, Brian Harman, Lucas Herbert, Beau Hossler, Shugo Imahira, Jazz Janewattananond, Brendan Jones, Kurt Kitayama, Patton Kizzire, Russell Knox, Satoshi Kodaira, Mikko Korhonen, Tom Lewis, Li Haotong, David Lipsky, Luke List, Mike Lorenzo-Vera, Joost Luiten, Shaun Norris, Adrián Otaegui, Eddie Pepperell, Pat Perez, Richard Sterne, Steve Stricker, Julian Suri, Michael Thompson, Erik van Rooyen, Matt Wallace, Lee Westwood

- Charl Schwartzel did not play due to a wrist injury.

13. Players below 70th place in official money standings, to fill the field

- Sam Ryder did not play due to a wrist injury.

Alternates (per category 13)

1. Bronson Burgoon (75th in standings) – replaced Charl Schwartzel
2. Kang Sung-hoon (76) – replaced Davis Love III but subsequently qualified under category 11
3. Richy Werenski (77) – replaced Sam Ryder
4. Patrick Rodgers (80) – did not play due to injury
5. Joaquín Niemann (83) – took spot reserved for AT&T Byron Nelson winner
6. Kelly Kraft (84) – replaced Justin Thomas
7. J. T. Poston (85) – replaced Vijay Singh

== Weather ==
- Thursday: Partly cloudy and breezy. High of 68 °F/20 °C. Wind NW 10–15 mph.
- Friday: Partly cloudy with showers. High of 65 °F/18 °C. Winds SSW 10–15 mph, with gusts to 25 mph.
- Saturday: Mostly sunny. High of 71 °F/22 °C. Wind NNW 5–10 mph.
- Sunday: Mostly cloudy. High of 68 °F/20 °C. Wind S 12–18 mph, with gusts to 25 mph.

== Round summaries ==
=== First round ===
Thursday, May 16, 2019

Defending champion Brooks Koepka led after the first round with a bogey-free course-record 63. It was the second time Koepka had scored 63 in a major championship; the first being in the second round when winning in 2018. World number 119, Danny Lee was a stroke behind after a round of 64 which included eight birdies and two bogeys. Tommy Fleetwood was in third place, four behind Koepka. 16 players broke the par of 70, including world number-one Dustin Johnson. Masters champion Tiger Woods scored 72, a round that contained an eagle, three birdies, three bogeys and two double-bogeys.

Place	Player	Score	To par
1	(United States) Brooks Koepka	63	−7
2	(New Zealand) Danny Lee	64	−6
3	(England) Tommy Fleetwood	67	−3
T4	(South Korea) Kang Sung-hoon	68	−2
T4	(United States) Luke List	68	−2
T4	(France) Mike Lorenzo-Vera	68	−2
T4	(United States) Pat Perez	68	−2
T4	(United States) Chez Reavie	68	−2
T9	(United States) Patrick Cantlay	69	−1
T9	(Australia) Jason Day	69	−1
T9	(United States) Rickie Fowler	69	−1
T9	(United States) Dustin Johnson	69	−1
T9	(South Korea) Kim Si-woo	69	−1
T9	(United States) Phil Mickelson	69	−1
T9	(United States) Jordan Spieth	69	−1
T9	(England) Matt Wallace	69	−1

=== Second round ===
Friday, May 17, 2019

Brooks Koepka shot a second round 65 which included seven birdies and two bogeys. He set a new record for the lowest 36-hole score in a major championship and his seven stroke lead over Adam Scott and Jordan Spieth also set a 36-hole PGA Championship record and was the largest at the halfway point of any major championship since Henry Cotton led by nine in the 1934 Open Championship. Scott was the only player to score lower than Koepka, with a round of 64 than included seven birdies in the first 14 holes and a bogey at the 17th. Danny Lee, in second place after the first round, dropped six shots in his first seven holes and finished with a round of 74.

82 players made the cut at 144, four strokes over par. Amongst those missing the cut were Masters champion Tiger Woods and world number 8 Bryson DeChambeau. Three PGA club professionals made the cut: Marty Jertson, Rob Labritz and Ryan Vermeer. This was the most since the number of qualifiers through the PGA Professional Championship was reduced from 25 to 20 in 2006.

Place	Player	Score	To par
1	(United States) Brooks Koepka	63-65=128	−12
T2	(Australia) Adam Scott	71-64=135	−5
T2	(United States) Jordan Spieth	69-66=135	−5
T4	(United States) Daniel Berger	70-66=136	−4
T4	(United States) Dustin Johnson	69-67=136	−4
T4	(United States) Kelly Kraft	71-65=136	−4
T4	(United States) Luke List	68-68=136	−4
T4	(England) Matt Wallace	69-67=136	−4
9	(England) Justin Rose	70-67=137	−3
T10	(England) Tommy Fleetwood	67-71=138	−2
T10	(United States) Rickie Fowler	69-69=138	−2
T10	(Thailand) Jazz Janewattananond	70-68=138	−2
T10	(South Korea) Kang Sung-hoon	68-70=138	−2
T10	(New Zealand) Danny Lee	64-74=138	−2
T10	(Japan) Hideki Matsuyama	70-68=138	−2
T10	(South Africa) Louis Oosthuizen	70-68=138	−2
T10	(South Africa) Erik van Rooyen	70-68=138	−2
T10	(United States) Harold Varner III	71-67=138	−2

=== Third round ===
Saturday, May 18, 2019

Brooks Koepka maintained his seven stroke lead after a level-par 70, a round that included three birdies and three bogeys. His seven shot lead after three rounds was a record for the PGA Championship, although he failed to break the 54-hole scoring record of 196 held by David Toms in the 2001 championship. Jazz Janewattananond and Harold Varner III had the best rounds of the day, both scoring 67 and moving into a tie for second place. Also tied for second were Dustin Johnson and Luke List. Adam Scott and Jordan Spieth both scored 72, dropping from second place into a tie for eighth.

Place	Player	Score	To par
1	(United States) Brooks Koepka	63-65-70=198	−12
T2	(Thailand) Jazz Janewattananond	70-68-67=205	−5
T2	(United States) Dustin Johnson	69-67-69=205	−5
T2	(United States) Luke List	68-68-69=205	−5
T2	(United States) Harold Varner III	71-67-67=205	−5
T6	(Japan) Hideki Matsuyama	70-68-68=206	−4
T6	(England) Matt Wallace	69-67-70=206	−4
T8	(United States) Patrick Cantlay	69-70-68=207	−3
T8	(United States) Xander Schauffele	70-69-68=207	−3
T8	(Australia) Adam Scott	71-64-72=207	−3
T8	(United States) Jordan Spieth	69-66-72=207	−3

=== Final round ===
Sunday, May 19, 2019

==== Summary ====
Defending champion Brooks Koepka won the championship with an 8-under-par score of 272. Leading by seven shots at the start of the day, he had five bogeys in the last eight holes but held on to win, two strokes ahead of runner-up Dustin Johnson. With three holes to play, world number one Johnson had closed to within a stroke of Koepka, but dropped strokes at the 16th and 17th holes. Patrick Cantlay, Jordan Spieth, and Matt Wallace finished tied for third place, six shots behind Koepka. Jazz Janewattananond started the day in a tie for second place but dropped seven strokes in the last seven holes and finished out of the top 10. Only six players broke the par of 280.

Rob Labritz won the crystal bowl as the leading PGA club professional at 290 (+10), tied for sixtieth place.

==== Final leaderboard ====
Champion
Crystal Bowl winner (leading PGA Club Pro)
(c) = past champion

Note: Top 15 and ties qualify for the 2020 PGA Championship; top 4 and ties qualify for the 2020 Masters Tournament

Place	Player	Score	To par	Money ($)
1	(United States) Brooks Koepka (c)	63-65-70-74=272	−8	1,980,000
2	(United States) Dustin Johnson	69-67-69-69=274	−6	1,188,000
T3	(United States) Patrick Cantlay	69-70-68-71=278	−2	575,500
T3	(United States) Jordan Spieth	69-66-72-71=278	−2	575,500
T3	(England) Matt Wallace	69-67-70-72=278	−2	575,500
6	(United States) Luke List	68-68-69-74=279	−1	380,000
7	(South Korea) Kang Sung-hoon	68-70-70-72=280	E	343,650
T8	(United States) Matt Kuchar	70-70-72-69=281	+1	264,395
T8	(Republic of Ireland) Shane Lowry	75-69-68-69=281	+1	264,395
T8	(Northern Ireland) Rory McIlroy (c)	72-71-69-69=281	+1	264,395
T8	(Australia) Adam Scott	71-64-72-74=281	+1	264,395
T8	(South Africa) Erik van Rooyen	70-68-70-73=281	+1	264,395
T8	(United States) Gary Woodland	70-70-73-68=281	+1	264,395

Leaderboard below the top 10
Place	Player	Score	To par	Money ($)
T14	(Thailand) Jazz Janewattananond	70-68-67-77=282	+2	191,665
T14	(United States) Chez Reavie	68-71-71-72=282	+2	191,665
T16	(Mexico) Abraham Ancer	73-70-69-71=283	+3	143,100
T16	(Denmark) Lucas Bjerregaard	71-69-70-73=283	+3	143,100
T16	(United States) Lucas Glover	72-69-69-73=283	+3	143,100
T16	(France) Mike Lorenzo-Vera	68-71-75-69=283	+3	143,100
T16	(Japan) Hideki Matsuyama	70-68-68-77=283	+3	143,100
T16	(United States) Xander Schauffele	70-69-68-76=283	+3	143,100
T16	(United States) Brandt Snedeker	74-67-73-69=283	+3	143,100
T23	(Australia) Jason Day (c)	69-74-69-72=284	+4	91,000
T23	(Argentina) Emiliano Grillo	76-67-70-71=284	+4	91,000
T23	(United States) Billy Horschel	70-72-71-71=284	+4	91,000
T23	(United States) Jason Kokrak	73-70-71-70=284	+4	91,000
T23	(Belgium) Thomas Pieters	74-70-71-69=284	+4	91,000
T23	(United States) Jimmy Walker (c)	70-70-71-73=284	+4	91,000
T29	(United States) Keegan Bradley (c)	70-70-73-72=285	+5	65,000
T29	(United States) Sam Burns	70-72-69-74=285	+5	65,000
T29	(England) Paul Casey	70-71-75-69=285	+5	65,000
T29	(Canada) Adam Hadwin	72-70-70-73=285	+5	65,000
T29	(Northern Ireland) Graeme McDowell	70-72-73-70=285	+5	65,000
T29	(England) Justin Rose	70-67-73-75=285	+5	65,000
T29	(United States) Webb Simpson	72-69-72-72=285	+5	65,000
T36	(United States) Rickie Fowler	69-69-71-77=286	+6	48,200
T36	(United States) Beau Hossler	72-69-77-68=286	+6	48,200
T36	(New Zealand) Danny Lee	64-74-71-77=286	+6	48,200
T36	(China) Li Haotong	73-69-70-74=286	+6	48,200
T36	(United States) Harold Varner III	71-67-67-81=286	+6	48,200
T41	(Thailand) Kiradech Aphibarnrat	76-68-68-75=287	+7	36,036
T41	(England) Matt Fitzpatrick	75-65-76-71=287	+7	36,036
T41	(United States) Charles Howell III	72-67-73-75=287	+7	36,036
T41	(United States) Adam Long	73-70-69-75=287	+7	36,036
T41	(United States) Scott Piercy	72-67-72-76=287	+7	36,036
T41	(England) Danny Willett	71-70-69-77=287	+7	36,036
T41	(United States) Aaron Wise	70-71-71-75=287	+7	36,036
T48	(United States) Bronson Burgoon	73-66-74-75=288	+8	26,250
T48	(England) Tommy Fleetwood	67-71-72-78=288	+8	26,250
T48	(England) Tyrrell Hatton	71-69-72-76=288	+8	26,250
T48	(United States) Kelly Kraft	71-65-78-74=288	+8	26,250
T48	(Italy) Francesco Molinari	72-68-73-75=288	+8	26,250
T48	(Sweden) Henrik Stenson	74-68-75-71=288	+8	26,250
T54	(United States) Cameron Champ	72-71-73-73=289	+9	22,850
T54	(South Africa) Justin Harding	74-70-73-72=289	+9	22,850
T54	(United States) Charley Hoffman	73-69-75-72=289	+9	22,850
T54	(United States) Zach Johnson	71-69-73-76=289	+9	22,850
T54	(Sweden) Alex Norén	73-69-74-73=289	+9	22,850
T54	(United States) J. J. Spaun	72-72-70-75=289	+9	22,850
T60	(England) Ross Fisher	74-67-77-72=290	+10	21,300
T60	(United States) Rob Labritz	75-69-74-72=290	+10	21,300
T60	(South Africa) Louis Oosthuizen	70-68-73-79=290	+10	21,300
T60	(United States) J. T. Poston	77-67-71-75=290	+10	21,300
T64	(Canada) Corey Conners	72-72-76-71=291	+11	20,200
T64	(United States) Tony Finau	70-73-69-79=291	+11	20,200
T64	(United States) Max Homa	70-71-79-71=291	+11	20,200
T64	(United States) Kurt Kitayama	74-68-77-72=291	+11	20,200
T64	(Netherlands) Joost Luiten	72-72-77-70=291	+11	20,200
T64	(Denmark) Thorbjørn Olesen	73-70-71-77=291	+11	20,200
T64	(Australia) Cameron Smith	73-70-74-74=291	+11	20,200
T71	(United States) Daniel Berger	70-66-78-78=292	+12	19,250
T71	(Spain) Rafa Cabrera-Bello	75-69-74-74=292	+12	19,250
T71	(United States) Joel Dahmen	70-72-71-79=292	+12	19,250
T71	(Australia) Lucas Herbert	74-70-73-75=292	+12	19,250
T71	(United States) David Lipsky	70-74-77-71=292	+12	19,250
T71	(United States) Phil Mickelson (c)	69-71-76-76=292	+12	19,250
77	(United States) Kevin Tway	73-70-76-74=293	+13	18,900
T78	(United States) Pat Perez	68-73-76-77=294	+14	18,750
T78	(United States) Andrew Putnam	74-70-75-75=294	+14	18,750
T80	(United States) Rich Beem (c)	75-69-82-69=295	+15	18,550
T80	(United States) Ryan Vermeer	70-74-72-79=295	+15	18,550
82	(United States) Marty Jertson	72-69-79-79=299	+19	18,400
CUT	(United States) Ryan Armour	74-71=145	+5	
CUT	(South Africa) Dylan Frittelli	77-68=145	+5	
CUT	(United States) Jim Furyk	73-72=145	+5	
CUT	(Spain) Sergio García	74-71=145	+5	
CUT	(United States) Tyler Hall	72-73=145	+5	
CUT	(South Korea) Im Sung-jae	71-74=145	+5	
CUT	(Germany) Martin Kaymer (c)	74-71=145	+5	
CUT	(United States) Michael Kim	74-71=145	+5	
CUT	(United States) Patton Kizzire	70-75=145	+5	
CUT	(Scotland) Russell Knox	72-73=145	+5	
CUT	(United States) Keith Mitchell	74-71=145	+5	
CUT	(United States) Kevin Na	72-73=145	+5	
CUT	(Spain) Adrián Otaegui	73-72=145	+5	
CUT	(Spain) Jon Rahm	70-75=145	+5	
CUT	(United States) Kyle Stanley	71-74=145	+5	
CUT	(United States) Steve Stricker	73-72=145	+5	
CUT	(United States) Julian Suri	72-73=145	+5	
CUT	(United States) Martin Trainer	75-70=145	+5	
CUT	(United States) Bubba Watson	76-69=145	+5	
CUT	(United States) Tiger Woods (c)	72-73=145	+5	
CUT	(United States) Bryson DeChambeau	72-74=146	+6	
CUT	(South Africa) Branden Grace	73-73=146	+6	
CUT	(South Korea) Kim Si-woo	69-77=146	+6	
CUT	(Chile) Joaquín Niemann	75-71=146	+6	
CUT	(England) Ian Poulter	72-74=146	+6	
CUT	(United States) Patrick Reed	74-72=146	+6	
CUT	(United States) Richy Werenski	72-74=146	+6	
CUT	(United States) Ben Cook	74-73=147	+7	
CUT	(Japan) Shugo Imahira	74-73=147	+7	
CUT	(England) Tom Lewis	76-71=147	+7	
CUT	(United States) Brian Mackey	74-73=147	+7	
CUT	(United States) Troy Merritt	72-75=147	+7	
CUT	(South Africa) Shaun Norris	73-74=147	+7	
CUT	(England) Lee Westwood	75-72=147	+7	
CUT	(South Korea) An Byeong-hun	74-74=148	+8	
CUT	(United States) Jason Dufner (c)	76-72=148	+8	
CUT	(New Zealand) Ryan Fox	78-70=148	+8	
CUT	(United States) J. B. Holmes	71-77=148	+8	
CUT	(Finland) Mikko Korhonen	74-74=148	+8	
CUT	(Australia) Marc Leishman	74-74=148	+8	
CUT	(South Africa) Richard Sterne	75-73=148	+8	
CUT	(United States) Jason Caron	70-79=149	+9	
CUT	(United States) Chesson Hadley	72-77=149	+9	
CUT	(Japan) Satoshi Kodaira	73-76=149	+9	
CUT	(Taiwan) Pan Cheng-tsung	78-71=149	+9	
CUT	(United States) Michael Thompson	77-72=149	+9	
CUT	(United States) Justin Bertsch	77-73=150	+10	
CUT	(Spain) Jorge Campillo	77-73=150	+10	
CUT	(United States) Ryan Moore	73-77=150	+10	
CUT	(United States) Casey Russell	77-73=150	+10	
CUT	(United States) Rich Berberian Jr.	76-75=151	+11	
CUT	(United States) John Daly (c)	75-76=151	+11	
CUT	(England) Eddie Pepperell	76-75=151	+11	
CUT	(South Korea) Yang Yong-eun (c)	76-75=151	+11	
CUT	(United States) Alex Beach	77-75=152	+12	
CUT	(Republic of Ireland) Pádraig Harrington (c)	75-77=152	+12	
CUT	(United States) Ryan Palmer	77-75=152	+12	
CUT	(South Africa) Brandon Stone	79-73=152	+12	
CUT	(United States) Craig Bowden	78-75=153	+13	
CUT	(United States) Kevin Kisner	77-76=153	+13	
CUT	(Venezuela) Jhonattan Vegas	76-77=153	+13	
CUT	(United States) Brian Harman	77-77=154	+14	
CUT	(United States) Shaun Micheel (c)	77-77=154	+14	
CUT	(United States) Rod Perry	77-77=154	+14	
CUT	(United States) Danny Balin	78-77=155	+15	
CUT	(Sweden) Alexander Björk	80-75=155	+15	
CUT	(Australia) Brendan Jones	78-77=155	+15	
CUT	(United States) John O'Leary	79-78=157	+17	
CUT	(Australia) Stuart Deane	82-76=158	+18	
CUT	(Australia) Craig Hocknull	82-77=159	+19	
CUT	(United States) Jeffrey Schmid	81-78=159	+19	
CUT	(United States) Cory Schneider	74-85=159	+19	
CUT	(United States) Andrew Filbert	84-82=166	+26	
WD	(United States) Brian Gay	81	+11	

==== Scorecard ====
Hole	1	2	3	4	5	6	7	8	9	10	11	12	13	14	15	16	17	18
Par	4	4	3	5	4	4	4	3	4	4	4	4	5	3	4	4	3	4
(United States) Koepka	−11	−11	−11	−12	−12	−12	−12	−12	−12	−13	−12	−11	−10	−9	−9	−9	−8	−8
(United States) Johnson	−5	−5	−5	−6	−6	−7	−7	−7	−8	−8	−7	−7	−7	−7	−8	−7	−6	−6
(United States) Cantlay	−4	−4	−3	−4	−5	−5	−4	−4	−3	−3	−3	−1	−2	−2	−2	−2	−2	−2
(United States) Spieth	−3	−3	−3	−3	−3	−3	−3	−3	−3	−4	−4	−3	−3	−3	−3	−2	−2	−2
(England) Wallace	−4	−5	−5	−5	−5	−5	−5	−5	−5	−5	−5	−3	−3	−3	−3	−3	−2	−2
(United States) List	−5	−4	−3	−3	−3	−2	−1	−2	−3	−3	E	E	−1	−1	−1	−1	−2	−1
(South Korea) Kang	−2	−2	−1	−2	−2	−2	−3	−3	−3	E	E	E	E	+1	E	E	E	E
(Thailand) Janewattananond	−4	−4	−4	−5	−5	−5	−5	−5	−5	−5	−5	−3	−2	−1	E	+1	+2	+2
(United States) Varner III	−6	−6	−4	−2	−1	−1	E	E	+1	+1	+1	+2	+3	+5	+5	+6	+6	+6

Cumulative tournament scores, relative to par

Birdie	Bogey	Double bogey	Triple bogey+
