= Michigan PGA Championship =

The Michigan PGA Championship is a golf tournament that is the section championship of the Michigan section of the PGA of America. It has been played annually since 1922 at a variety of courses around the state.

The 2018 event was noticeable for a nearly-forgotten rule that a participant must have 60 days of membership in the Michigan PGA. Ben Cook had the lowest score and received first place money, but Lee Houtteman was awarded the win and an exemption to the first Rocket Mortgage Classic. Cook was still eligible for entry into the PGA Professional Championship.

== Winners ==
- 2026 Timothy Pearce
- 2025 Patrick Wilkes-Krier
- 2024 Ben Cook
- 2023 Kyle Martin
- 2022 Kyle Martin
- 2021 Ben Cook
- 2020 Ben Cook
- 2019 Jeff Roth
- 2018 Lee Houtteman / Ben Cook
- 2017 John Seltzer III
- 2016 Scott Hebert
- 2015 Dan Urban
- 2014 Scott Hebert
- 2013 Brian Cairns
- 2012 Scott Hebert
- 2011 Scott Hebert
- 2010 Ron Beurman
- 2009 Scott Hebert
- 2008 Scott Hebert
- 2007 Scott Hebert
- 2006 Scott Hebert
- 2005 John DalCorobbo
- 2004 Joe Pollack
- 2003 Jeff Roth
- 2002 Ken Allard
- 2001 Jeff Roth
- 2000 Brian Cairns
- 1999 Jeff Roth
- 1998 Jeff Roth
- 1997 Tom Harding
- 1996 Brian Cairns
- 1995 Steve Brady
- 1994 Bob Makoski
- 1993 Steve Brady
- 1992 Barry Redmond
- 1991 Ken Allard
- 1990 Barry Redmond
- 1989 Ken Allard
- 1988 Jack Seltzer
- 1987 Lynn Janson
- 1986 Gary Robinson
- 1985 Lynn Janson
- 1984 John Traub
- 1983 Buddy Whitten
- 1982 Tom Doozan
- 1981 Lynn Janson
- 1980 Al Mengart
- 1979 Lynn Janson
- 1978 Randy Erskine
- 1977 Buddy Whitten
- 1976 Al Mengert
- 1975 Gene Bone
- 1974 Ron Aleks
- 1973 Glenn Stuart
- 1972 Larry Mancour
- 1971 John Molenda
- 1970 Dick Bury
- 1969 Glenn Stuart
- 1968 Mike Souchak
- 1967 Tom Deaton
- 1966 Gene Bone
- 1965 Brien C. Charter
- 1964 Ted Kroll
- 1963 Dick Bury
- 1962 Ben Lula
- 1961 John Barnum
- 1960 Ron Fox
- 1959 Chick Harbert
- 1958 John Barnum
- 1957 John Barnum
- 1956 Jim Johnson
- 1955 Walter Burkemo
- 1954 Al Watrous
- 1953 Chick Harbert
- 1952 Al Watrous
- 1951 Ed Furgol
- 1950 Chick Harbert
- 1949 Chick Harbert
- 1948 Horton Smith
- 1947 Chick Harbert
- 1946 Chick Harbert
- 1945 Sam Byrd
- 1944 Sam Byrd
- 1943 Jimmy Demaret
- 1942 Marvin Stahl
- 1941 Al Watrous
- 1940 Em Kocsis
- 1939 Al Watrous
- 1938 Al Watrous
- 1937 Joe Belfore
- 1936 Al Watrous
- 1935 Charles Sommers
- 1934 Mortie Dutra
- 1933 Joe Belfore
- 1932 Al Watrous
- 1931 Walter Hagen
- 1930 Walter Hagen
- 1929 Clarence Gamber
- 1928 Em Kocsis
- 1927 James Kinnear
- 1926 Wilfrid Reid
- 1925 Frank Sprogell
- 1924 Al Watrous
- 1923 Dave Robertson
- 1922 Al Watrous
