= Outlets at Legends =

Shopping outlet and casino in Sparks, Nevada

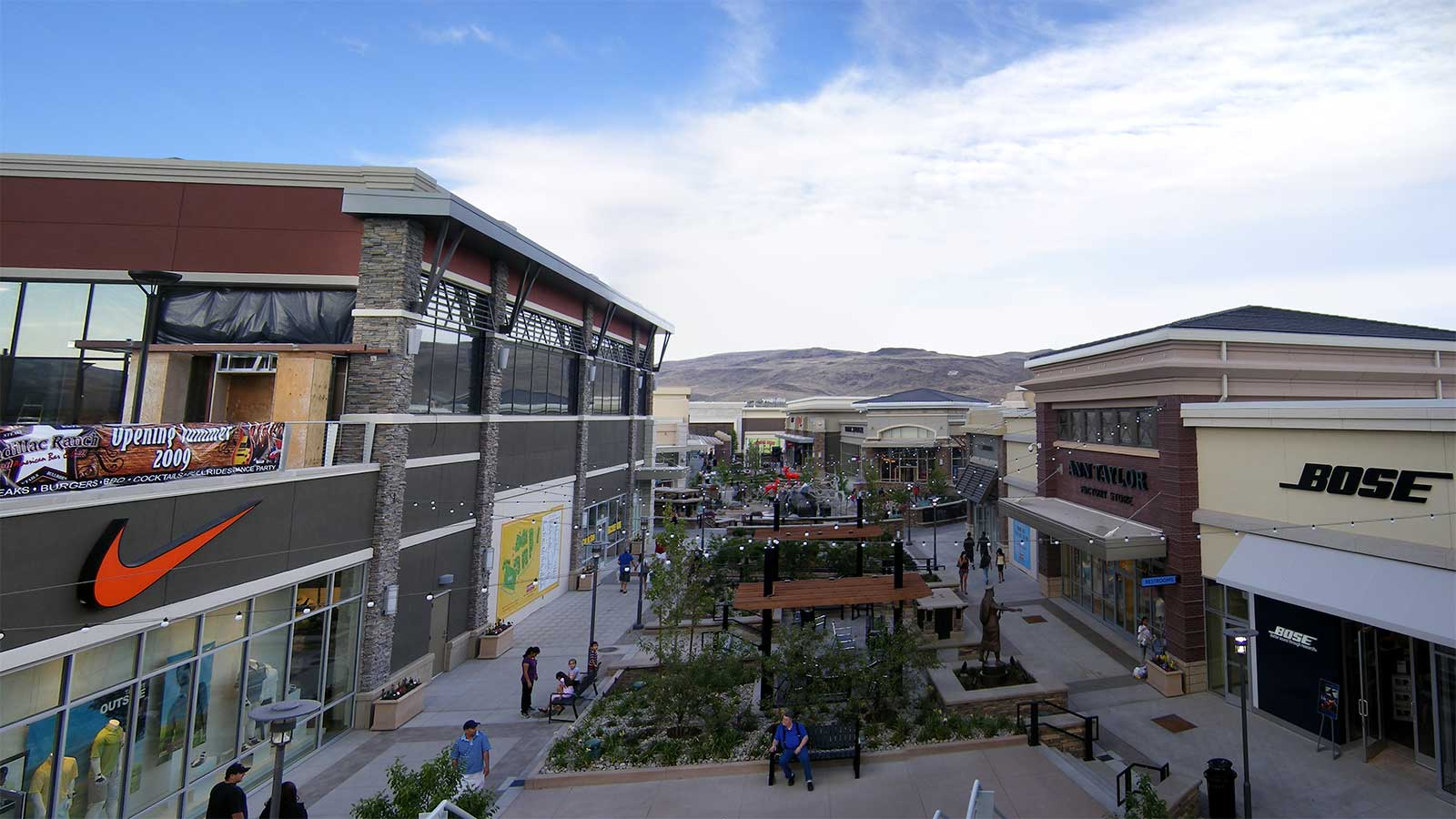
- Main walkway
- Location: Sparks, Nevada United States
- Coordinates: 39.531122°N 119.72012°W
- Opened: 2008
- Developer: Red Development
- Manager: Red Development
- Owner: Red Development
- Num. of stores: 100+
- Floor area: 1,000,000 square feet (93,000 m^{2})
- Website: experiencelegends.com

The Outlets at Legends is an upscale outlet center in Sparks, Nevada, owned and managed by RED Development. Legends contains around 45 retailers and restaurants and it is anchored by Scheels All Sports. Lowes and Target also anchor the mall. A casino, Legends Bay Casino, was added in 2022.

== History ==
Legends, which opened in 2008, was the 2008–2009 title sponsor of the PGA Tour’s Reno-Tahoe Open at Montrêux Golf & County Club. Title sponsorship was dropped for the 2010 tournament.

Legends' master plan include plans for an upscale casino resort, a 6,500-seat arena, entertainment venues (including a megaplex with 13 screens plus an IMAX screen) and additional restaurants and shopping. Throughout the shopping center there are plaques and sculptures to commemorate individuals throughout Nevada's history. The IMAX (the only IMAX in the Reno area) is built at the Legends Outlets Mall as of January 2014.

== Legends Bay Casino ==
In 2010, Olympia Gaming won approval to develop a new hotel-casino, to be called Legends Bay Casino-Resort. While the hotel-casino had been part of the original plans for the location, after the 2008 recession, the casino was put on hold. A permit was approved to build Legends Bay Casino in May 2020, but Olympia Gaming said they were holding off on construction due to the pandemic and state of the gaming market. Olympia Gaming announced in March 2021 that it was breaking ground on the casino, to be named Legends Bay Casino. The facility is designed to be 80,000 square feet with a casino, bars, restaurants, and a sportsbook. On one side of the property is the Galaxy Theater, and on the other side are Hampton Inn and Suites and Residence Inn hotels. Opening date is expected for the summer of 2022. The casino is the first to be built in the Reno-Sparks metropolitan area since 1995. It will also have valet parking and both table games and slot machines.

The 80,000-square foot casino opened August 30, 2022, with 665 slot machines, 10 table games and a variety of dining options. Its sportsbook is run by local operator Circa Sports.

== See also ==
- List of casinos in Nevada
