= Westchester Open =

American golf tournament

The Westchester Open is a golf tournament organized by the Westchester Golf Association. It has been played annually since 1920 at member clubs in New York or Connecticut. It was considered a PGA Tour event in the 1920s and 1930s.

== History ==
In 1971, the 29-year-old amateur David Ragaini played the event. Ragaini was on the Yale Bulldogs golf team during his college years and was a three-time letter winner. However, when he entered the 1971 Westchester Open he hadn't played a competitive tournament since 1964 and been working as a commercial singer for most of his career. Playing against a number of well-known names, like current PGA Tour pro Don Massengale, former Masters champion Doug Ford, and elite amateur Dick Siderowf, Ragaini "stunned" his competition, taking the lead late. The result was still in doubt down the stretch but Ragaini "sank long putts to save pars on the final two holes" to win.

== Winners ==
- 2026 Nathan Han
- 2025 Michael Miller
- 2024 Michael Miller
- 2023 James Nicholas
- 2022 Bradford Tilley (amateur)
- 2021 Rob Labritz
- 2020 Paul Pastore
- 2019 Frank Bensel
- 2018 Cameron Young (amateur)
- 2017 Danny Balin
- 2016 Rob Labritz
- 2015 Danny Balin
- 2014 David Pastore (amateur)
- 2013 Colin McDade (amateur)
- 2012 Mike Ballo
- 2011 Greg Bisconti
- 2010 Danny Balin
- 2009 Craig Thomas
- 2008 John Stoltz
- 2007 Tony Demaria
- 2006 Ron Philo
- 2005 John Nieporte
- 2004 Frank Bensel
- 2003 Dave Fusco
- 2002 Tom Sutter
- 2001 Dave Fusco
- 2000 Carl Alexander
- 1999 Bill Van Orman
- 1998 Bruce Zabriski
- 1997 Bruce Zabriski
- 1996 Ron McDougal
- 1995 Bruce Zabriski
- 1994 Delroy Cambridge
- 1993 Rick Vershure
- 1992 Bobby Heins
- 1991 Rick Vershure
- 1990 Bobby Heins
- 1989 Ron McDougal
- 1988 Bobby Heins
- 1987 Mike White
- 1986 Bill Britton
- 1985 Evan Schiller
- 1984 Bruce Douglass
- 1983 Bobby Heins
- 1982 Bobby Heins
- 1981 Bobby Heins
- 1980 Gene Borek
- 1979 John Gentile
- 1978 John Gentile
- 1977 Tom Joyce
- 1976 John Ruby
- 1975 John Gentile
- 1974 Kelley Moser
- 1973 John Gentile
- 1972 Don Massengale
- 1971 David Ragaini (amateur)
- 1970 John Buczek
- 1969 Mike Krak
- 1968 Denny Lyons (amateur)
- 1967 Roy Pace
- 1966 Frank Wharton
- 1965 Terry Wilcox
- 1964 Terry Wilcox
- 1963 Doug Ford
- 1962 Gil Cavanaugh and Roger Ginsberg (amateur)
- 1961 Doug Ford
- 1960 Claude Harmon
- 1959 Robert Watson
- 1958 Fred Annon
- 1957 Mickey Homa
- 1956 Mickey Homa
- 1955 Mickey Homa
- 1954 Herman Barron
- 1953 Claude Harmon
- 1952 Fred Annon
- 1951 Claude Harmon
- 1950 Claude Harmon
- 1949 Jack Patroni
- 1948 Tony Manero
- 1947 Claude Harmon
- 1946 Claude Harmon
- 1943–45 No tournament due to World War II
- 1942 Paul Runyan
- 1941 Mike Turnesa
- 1940 Ben Hogan
- 1939 Paul Runyan
- 1938 Frank Moore
- 1937 Frank Moore
- 1936 Paul Runyan
- 1935 Paul Runyan
- 1934 Paul Runyan
- 1933 Mike Turnesa
- 1932 Tony Manero
- 1931 Paul Runyan
- 1930 Willie Macfarlane
- 1929 Bobby Cruickshank
- 1928 Bill Mehlhorn
- 1927 Bobby Cruickshank
- 1926 Johnny Farrell
- 1925 Mike Brady
- 1924 Willie Macfarlane
- 1923 George McLean
- 1922 Willie Macfarlane
- 1921 Jack Dowling
- 1920 Tom Kerrigan
