= Danny Balin =

American professional golfer

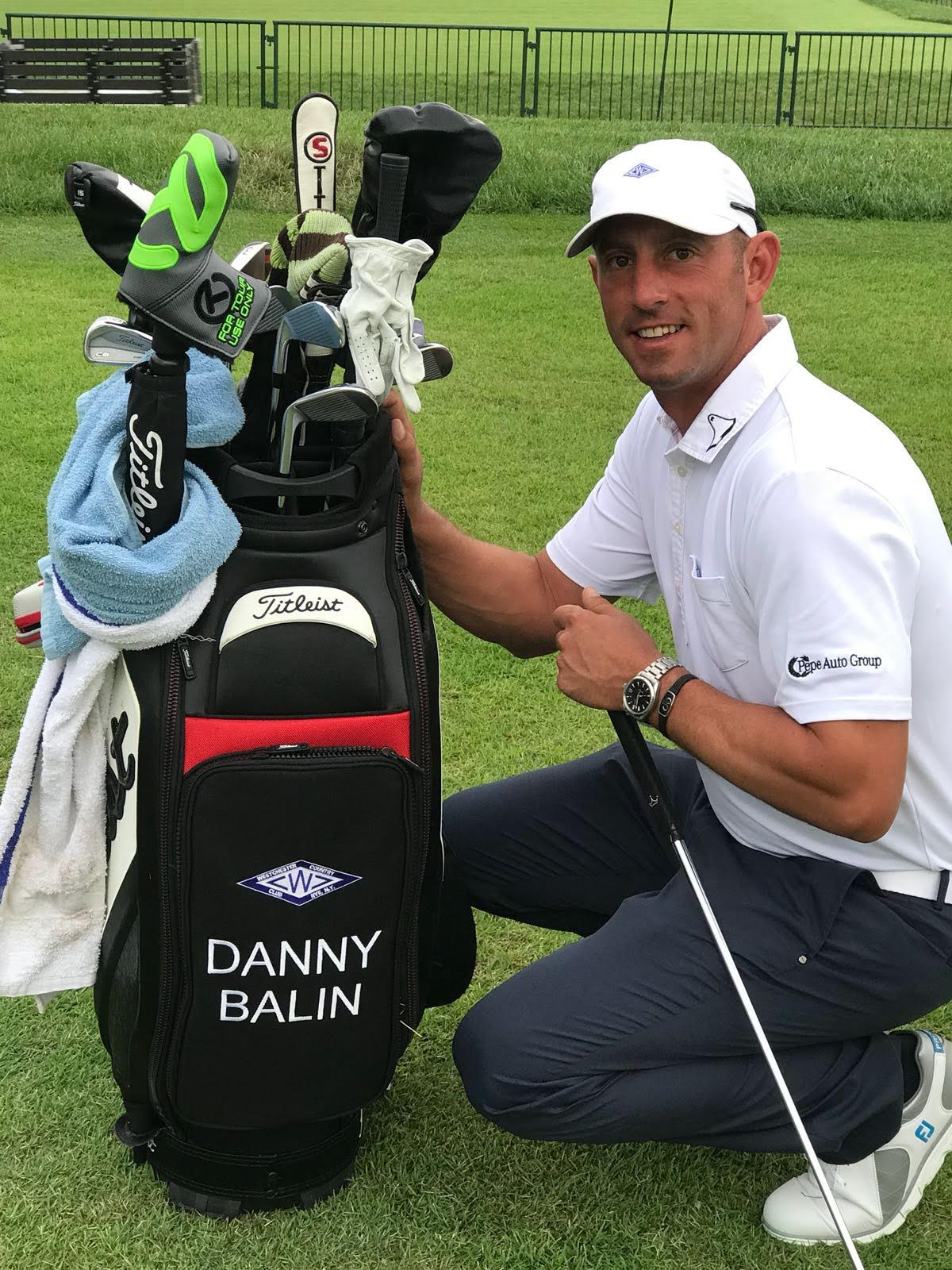

Personal information
- Full name: Daniel Balin
- Nationality: United States
- Born: April 9, 1982 (age 44) Rockville, Maryland, U.S.
- Height: 6 ft 1 in (1.85 m)
- Weight: 205 lb (93 kg; 14.6 st)

Career
- Sport: Golf
- College: Penn State University
- Turned professional: 2005
- Former tours: PGA Tour Canada; PGA Tour Latinoamérica
- Professional wins: 14

Best results in major championships
- Masters Tournament: DNP
- PGA Championship: CUT: 2010, 2011, 2012, 2013, 2018, 2019, 2020, 2021
- U.S. Open: CUT: 2020
- The Open Championship: DNP

Danny Balin (born April 9, 1982) is an American professional golfer.

Balin is a seven-time PGA of America Metropolitan Section Player of the Year (2010, 2011, 2012, 2018, 2019, 2021, 2025), and the 2012, 2013 and 2021 New York State Open champion.

Balin has played in nine major championships including the 2010, 2011, 2012, 2013, 2018, 2019, 2020, and 2021 PGA Championships. In the 2020 U.S. Open at Winged Foot Golf Club, Michael O'Keefe, who played Danny Noonan in the movie Caddyshack, caddied for Balin in the practice rounds.

Balin played three seasons on PGA Tour Latinoamérica and won the 2015 Guatemala Stella Artois Open.

Originally from Rockville, Maryland, Balin currently resides in Westchester County, New York, with his wife and daughter, and is the head golf professional at Fresh Meadow Country Club.

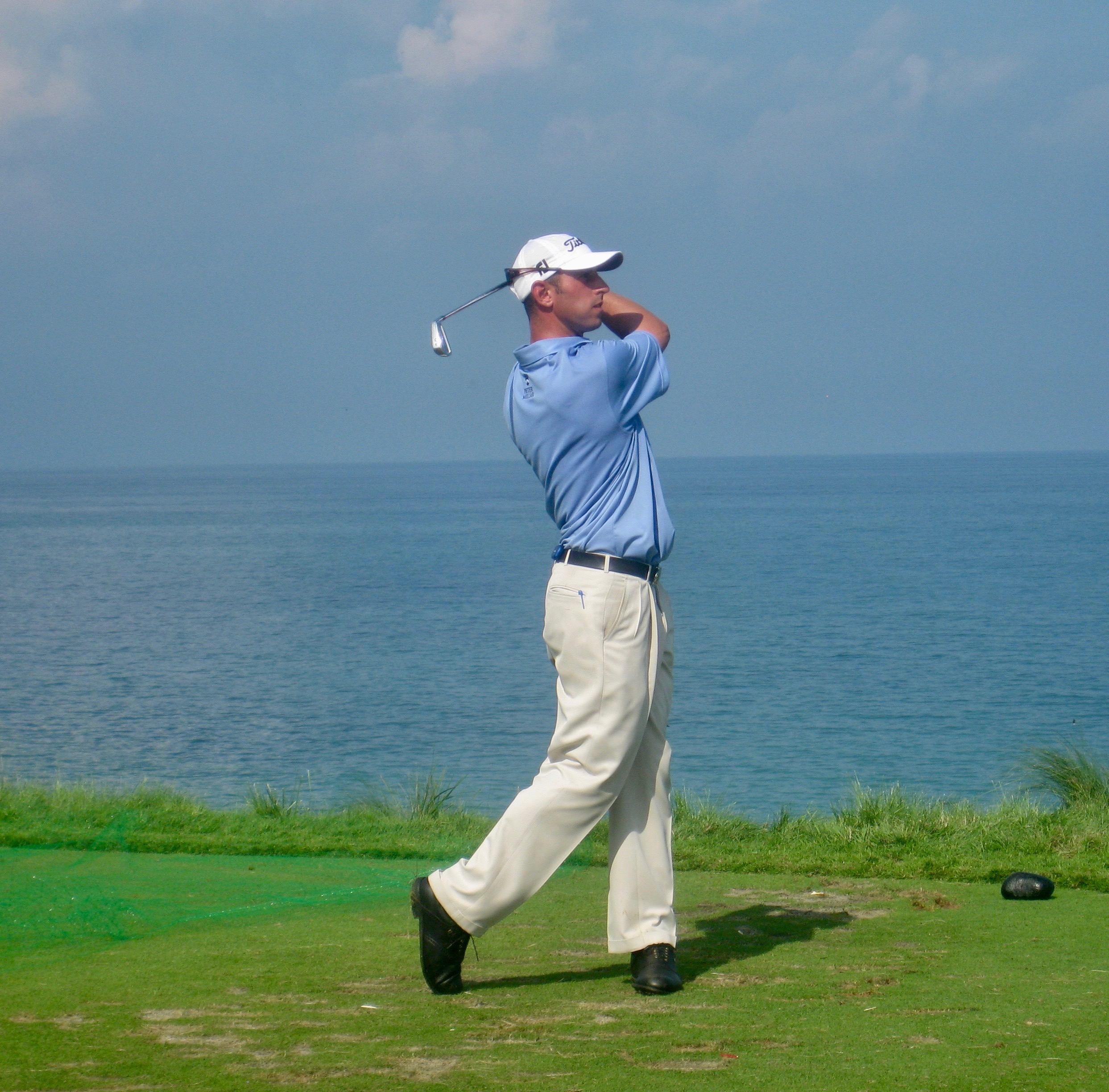
Balin at the 2010 PGA Championship

== Professional wins (14) ==
=== PGA Tour Latinoamérica wins (1) ===
No.	Date	Tournament	Winning score	Margin of victory	Runner-up
1	24 May 2015	Guatemala Stella Artois Open	−15 (70-65-66=201) (Note: Shortened to 54 holes due to weather.)	4 strokes	(United States) Eric Dugas

=== Other wins (13) ===
- 2010 Westchester Open
- 2011 Metropolitan PGA Championship
- 2012 New York State Open, Metropolitan PGA Championship, Metropolitan Open
- 2013 New York State Open, Metropolitan PGA Championship
- 2015 Westchester Open
- 2017 Westchester Open
- 2021 POLO Golf Met PGA Head Pro Championship, New York State Open
- 2023 Met Pro Championship
- 2025 Metropolitan PGA Championship

== Results in major championships ==
Tournament	2010	2011	2012	2013	2014	2015	2016	2017	2018
U.S. Open									
PGA Championship	CUT	CUT	CUT	CUT					CUT

Tournament	2019	2020	2021
PGA Championship	CUT	CUT	CUT
U.S. Open		CUT	

CUT = missed the halfway cut
Note: Balin never played in the Masters Tournament or The Open Championship.

== U.S. national team appearances ==
- PGA Cup: 2011 (winners), 2019 (winners)
