= Ben Cook (golfer) =

American professional golfer (born 1993)

Personal information
- Nationality: United States
- Born: September 29, 1993 (age 33) Grand Rapids, Michigan, U.S.
- Height: 6 ft 2 in (188 cm)
- Weight: 195 lb (88 kg)

Career
- Sport: Golf
- College: Ferris State University
- Turned professional: 2017
- Former tour: PGA Tour Latinoamérica
- Professional wins: 5

Best results in major championships
- Masters Tournament: DNP
- PGA Championship: T44: 2021
- U.S. Open: DNP
- The Open Championship: DNP

Ben Cook (born September 29, 1993) is an American professional golfer.

== Amateur career ==
Cook competed for South Christian High School and Ferris State University.

== Professional career ==
Cook turned professional in 2017 and played on the PGA Tour Latinoamérica in 2018. He has worked primarily as a club pro since then.

Cook made the cut on the number at the 2021 PGA Championship, his third appearance at the event. He previously qualified for the 2019 PGA Championship and 2020 PGA Championship, missing the cut both times. Cook finished T44 in 2021 and earned the Crystal Ball as the low PGA Professional.

Cook plays out the Michigan section of the PGA of America. He has also played out of the Northern Ohio section.

== Professional wins ==
- 2017 Northern Ohio PGA Championship
- 2018 Michigan PGA Section Assistants Championship, Michigan PGA Championship
- 2020 Michigan PGA Championship
- 2021 Michigan PGA Championship
- 2024 Michigan PGA Championship

== U.S. national team appearances ==
- PGA Cup: 2019 (winners)
