= Richy Werenski =

American professional golfer (born 1991)

Personal information
- Full name: Richard Raymond Werenski
- Nationality: United States
- Born: December 22, 1991 (age 34) Springfield, Massachusetts, U.S.
- Height: 6 ft 1 in (1.85 m)
- Weight: 175 lb (79 kg; 12.5 st)

Career
- Sport: Golf
- College: Georgia Tech
- Turned professional: 2014
- Current tours: PGA Tour; Korn Ferry Tour
- Professional wins: 5

Number of wins by tour
- PGA Tour: 1
- Korn Ferry Tour: 1
- Other: 3

Best results in major championships
- Masters Tournament: DNP
- PGA Championship: T38: 2021
- U.S. Open: CUT: 2018, 2020
- The Open Championship: DNP

Richard Raymond Werenski (born December 22, 1991) is an American professional golfer.

== Early life ==
Werenski was born in Springfield, Massachusetts, but grew up in South Hadley and played golf at The Orchards Golf Club. He played college golf at Georgia Tech. He won the 2012 Porter Cup.

== Professional career ==
Werenski turned professional after graduating from Georgia Tech in 2014. He won his first two professional events, the Cutter Creek Classic, on the NGA Pro Golf Tour, and the Vermont Open; he added another NGA Pro Golf Tour win in July 2014.

In early 2015, Werenski won the Golf Channel's reality show Big Break The Palm Beaches, FL. As the winner of The Big Break, he earned entry into the Barbasol Championship. He made the cut, finishing T72 in his first PGA Tour event.

Werenski earned his 2015 Web.com Tour card through qualifying school. He won for the first - and only - time on the Web.com Tour at the 2016 BMW Charity Pro-Am. He finished the 2016 regular season second on the money list, which automatically earned him his PGA Tour card for 2017 as a Web.com graduate.

On the PGA Tour in 2017, Werenski had a solid rookie year with three top-10s, including a playoff loss at the Barracuda Championship. He made the 2017 FedEx Cup Playoffs and finished the season 106th in points to retain his card for 2018. In 2018, he had another solid season, carding two top-10s, including another T-2 finish (this time at the Barbasol Championship), and made the playoffs again. He finished 110th in points and retained his card for 2019.

In October 2019, Werenski broke a wrist in a car accident. He returned to the PGA Tour in January 2020. At the 3M Open in July 2020, he led the field after the first round, was tied for the lead after the second and third rounds, and finished with a T-3.

On August 2, 2020, Werenski won the PGA Tour's opposite field event, the Barracuda Championship on Tahoe Mountain Club's Old Greenwood Course in Truckee, California. He holed a flop shot from the fairway on the par-4 16th for a five-point eagle and birdied the last for a one-point victory over Troy Merritt. Werenski won the event three years after losing to Chris Stroud on the second hole of a playoff. The win made Werenski one of the last entrants into the 2020 PGA Championship.

== Amateur wins ==
- 2012 Porter Cup

== Professional wins (5) ==
=== PGA Tour wins (1) ===
No.	Date	Tournament	Winning score	Margin of victory	Runner-up
1	Aug 2, 2020	Barracuda Championship	39 pts (6-11-9-13=39)	1 point	(United States) Troy Merritt

PGA Tour playoff record (0–1)

No.	Year	Tournament	Opponents	Result
1	2017	Barracuda Championship	(England) Greg Owen, (United States) Chris Stroud	Stroud won with birdie on second extra hole Owen eliminated by birdie on first hole

=== Web.com Tour wins (1) ===
No.	Date	Tournament	Winning score	Margin of victory	Runners-up
1	May 22, 2016	BMW Charity Pro-Am	−21 (68-67-65-65=265)	2 strokes	(United States) Brian Campbell, (Australia) Brett Drewitt, (United States) Zack Sucher

=== NGA Pro Golf Tour wins (2) ===
- 2014 Cutter Creek Classic, Seven Lakes NGA Classic

=== Other wins (1) ===
- 2014 Vermont Open

== Results in major championships ==
Results not in chronological order before 2019 and in 2020.

Tournament	2018	2019	2020	2021
Masters Tournament				
PGA Championship		CUT	CUT	T38
U.S. Open	CUT		CUT	
The Open Championship			NT	

Did not play

CUT = missed the halfway cut
NT = No tournament due to COVID-19 pandemic

== Results in The Players Championship ==
Tournament	2018	2019	2020	2021	2022
The Players Championship	T23	T47	C	CUT	CUT

"T" indicates a tie for a place
CUT = missed the halfway cut
C = Canceled after the first round due to the COVID-19 pandemic

== See also ==
- 2016 Web.com Tour Finals graduates
- 2019 Korn Ferry Tour Finals graduates
