= Rob Labritz =

American professional golfer (born 1971)

Robert Labritz
Personal information
- Nationality: United States
- Born: May 31, 1971 (age 55)
- Height: 6 ft 0 in (1.83 m)
- Weight: 175 lb (79 kg; 12.5 st)
- Spouse: Kerry
- Children: 3

Career
- Sport: Golf
- Turned professional: 1991
- Current tour: PGA Tour Champions
- Former tour: Golden Bear Tour
- Professional wins: 10

Best results in major championships
- Masters Tournament: DNP
- PGA Championship: T60: 2019
- U.S. Open: DNP
- The Open Championship: DNP

Robert Labritz (born May 31, 1971) is an American professional golfer who currently plays on the PGA Tour Champions.

== Professional career ==
Early in his career, Labritz played on the Golden Bear Tour, a minitour. He won two events, Teardrop Championship and Waterford Hotel Classic.

In the 2000s, he started working as a club professional in New York state. He qualified for the 2002 PGA Championship and the 2003 PGA Championship. In 2003, he qualified for the PGA Cup. In addition, he won a number of local Met PGA section events, including the New York State PGA Championship and New York State Open three times.

Labritz was the only club professional to make the cut for the 2010 PGA Championship. He also qualified for the 2013, 2016, and 2019 PGA Championships. He was one of three PGA Professionals to make the cut in 2019 and earned the Crystal Ball as the low PGA Professional.

In 2021, Labritz was medalist and PGA Tour Champions Qualifying School earned membership on PGA Tour Champions.

== Personal life ==
Labritz has three children. He has worked at GlenArbor Golf Club in Bedford Hills, New York, for many years.

== Professional wins (10) ==
=== Golden Bear Tour wins (2) ===
| No. | Date | Tournament | Winning score | Margin of victory | Runner(s)-up |
|---|---|---|---|---|---|
| 1 | Jun 13, 1997 | Teardrop Championship | −10 (65-69=134) | Playoff | (United States) R. J. Nakashian |
| 2 | Jan 17, 2004 | Waterford Hotel Classic | −10 (65-70-71=206) | 1 stroke | (United States) George McNeill, (United States) Michael McNerney, (Bermuda) Michael Sims |

=== Other wins (8) ===
- 2006 New York State PGA Championship
- 2008 New York State Open
- 2011 New York State Open
- 2016 New York State Open, Westchester Open
- 2019 Rhode Island Open
- 2021 Massachusetts Open, Westchester Open

== Results in major championships ==
| Tournament | 2002 | 2003 | 2004 | 2005 | 2006 | 2007 | 2008 | 2009 |
|---|---|---|---|---|---|---|---|---|
| PGA Championship | CUT | CUT | | | | | | |

| Tournament | 2010 | 2011 | 2012 | 2013 | 2014 | 2015 | 2016 | 2017 | 2018 |
|---|---|---|---|---|---|---|---|---|---|
| PGA Championship | T68 | | | CUT | | | CUT | | |

| Tournament | 2019 | 2020 | 2021 |
|---|---|---|---|
| PGA Championship | T60 | CUT | CUT |

Note: The PGA Championship was the only major Labritz played.

Did not play

CUT = missed the half-way cut
"T" = tied

== U.S. national team appearances ==
- PGA Cup: 2003 (winners)
