= Jeff Hart (golfer) =

American professional golfer (born 1960)

Personal information
- Full name: Jeffrey Robert Hart
- Nationality: United States
- Born: May 5, 1960 (age 66) Pomona, California, U.S.
- Height: 5 ft 9 in (1.75 m)
- Weight: 150 lb (68 kg; 11 st)

Career
- Sport: Golf
- College: University of Southern California
- Turned professional: 1983
- Former tours: PGA Tour; Nationwide Tour; Gateway Tour; Champions Tour
- Professional wins: 4

Number of wins by tour
- Korn Ferry Tour: 1
- Other: 3

Best results in major championships
- Masters Tournament: DNP
- PGA Championship: CUT: 2020
- U.S. Open: CUT: 1985, 1992, 2001
- The Open Championship: DNP

Jeffrey Robert Hart (born May 5, 1960) is an American professional golfer. He has played on the PGA Tour, Nationwide Tour, and Champions Tour.

== Career ==
In 1960, Hart was born in Pomona, California. He played college golf at the University of Southern California where he was a two-time All-American.

Hart played on the PGA Tour for seven seasons: 1985, 1989–90, 1996–97, 2001, 2005. He also played on the PGA Tour's developmental tour for several seasons in the interim. His best finish on the PGA Tour was T-4 at the 1988 Deposit Guaranty Golf Classic. On the Nationwide Tour, he won once, at the 2000 Buy.com Steamtown Classic. He played on the PGA Tour Qualifying Tournament a record 16 times.

After turning 50, he played on the Champions Tour, earning his full card at the 2011 Qualifying School. His best finish is a T-3 at the 2015 Regions Tradition.

== Awards and honors ==
Hart is a life member of the Southern California section of the PGA of America.

== Amateur wins ==
- 1979 Southern California Amateur

== Professional wins (4) ==
=== Buy.com Tour wins (1) ===
No.	Date	Tournament	Winning score	Margin of victory	Runner-up
1	Jun 4, 2000	Buy.com Steamtown Classic	−5 (72-70-65-68=275)	1 stroke	(Canada) Ian Leggatt

=== Gateway Tour wins (2) ===
No.	Date	Tournament	Winning score	Margin of victory	Runner(s)-up
1	Mar 3, 2004	Pala Mesa Classic	−11 (68-69-68=205)	2 strokes	(United States) Jerry Smith, (United States) Brian Smock
2	Aug 12, 2011	Hawke & Co. Golf Classic	−12 (70-66-68=204)	2 strokes	(United States) Mark Warman

=== Other wins (1) ===
- 2019 Southern California PGA Championship

== Results in major championships ==
Tournament	1985	1986	1987	1988	1989
U.S. Open	CUT				
PGA Championship					

Tournament	1990	1991	1992	1993	1994	1995	1996	1997	1998	1999
U.S. Open			CUT							
PGA Championship										

Tournament	2000	2001	2002	2003	2004	2005	2006	2007	2008	2009
U.S. Open		CUT								
PGA Championship										

Tournament	2010	2011	2012	2013	2014	2015	2016	2017	2018
U.S. Open									
PGA Championship									

Tournament	2019	2020
PGA Championship		CUT
U.S. Open		

CUT = missed the halfway cut
Note: Hart never played in the Masters Tournament or The Open Championship.

== See also ==
- 1984 PGA Tour Qualifying School graduates
- 1988 PGA Tour Qualifying School graduates
- 1989 PGA Tour Qualifying School graduates
- 1995 PGA Tour Qualifying School graduates
- 1996 PGA Tour Qualifying School graduates
- 2000 Buy.com Tour graduates
- 2004 PGA Tour Qualifying School graduates
