= Reno–Tahoe Open =

Professional golf tournament

Coordinates: 39.345°N 120.143°W

Barracuda Championship

Tournament information
- Location: Truckee, California
- Established: 1999
- Courses: Tahoe Mountain Club (Old Greenwood Course)
- Par: 71
- Length: 7,480 yards (6,840 m)
- Tours: PGA Tour (alternate event); European Tour
- Format: Modified Stableford
- Prize fund: US$4,000,000
- Month played: July

Tournament record score
- Aggregate: 267 Vaughn Taylor (2005)
- To par: −21 as above
- Score: 50 points Erik van Rooyen (2021)

Current champion
- (United States) Ryan Gerard

Final champion
- Location in the United States Location in California

The Reno–Tahoe Open, sponsored as the Barracuda Championship since 2014, is a professional golf tournament on the PGA Tour in California. Founded in 1999, it is an alternate event played annually in August. Previously held at Montrêux Golf and Country Club outside Reno, Nevada, the tournament moved west in 2020 to Tahoe Mountain Club's Old Greenwood course in nearby Truckee, California.

Until 2010, it was held in August, the same week as the WGC-Bridgestone Invitational. For its first three years, it had a full field of 156 players, while the World Golf Championship event had a field of about 40. When the WGC event expanded to about 80 players in 2002, the field for the Reno–Tahoe Open was reduced to 132 players. With the launch of the FedEx Cup in 2007, the tournament and the WGC event were moved from late to early August. In 2010 the Reno–Tahoe Open was played several weeks earlier, opposite the Open Championship in mid-July. This lasted only one year, as it returned to early August in 2011, opposite the WGC-Bridgestone.

The purse in 2022 was $3.7 million, with a winner's share of $666,000. The Reno–Tahoe Open gained its first title sponsor for the 2008 event, the Legends at Sparks Marina. After two years the name was returned to "Reno–Tahoe Open" in 2010. Barracuda Networks became the title sponsor in 2014.

The Reno–Tahoe Open is an alternate event, which means the winner does not earn a Masters Tournament invitation. The winner still earns 24 OWGR points, 300 FedEx Cup points, a two-year tour exemption, and entry to the PGA Championship.

After flooding in West Virginia cancelled the Greenbrier Classic in 2016, the Reno–Tahoe Open was given the honor of awarding entry to the Open Championship to the leading non-exempt player.

In August 2021, it was announced that from 2022 onward, the event would become a co-sanctioned event with the European Tour. The event was not included on the 2026 PGA Tour.

== Highlights ==
- 1999: Notah Begay III wins the inaugural event.
- 2006: Yūsaku Miyazato becomes only the second player in PGA tour history to score two holes-in-one in the same round.
- 2011: Scott Piercy wins in the final year as a stroke play event.
- 2016: Greg Chalmers eagles the 18th hole after Gary Woodland made bogey, earning entry into the Open Championship. Chalmers was making his 386th PGA Tour start, the most among active golfers without a win, and only had veteran member status on the PGA Tour.
- 2017: In his 290th PGA Tour start, Chris Stroud won after planning to retire at season's end.
- 2019: In just his sixth start as a professional, Collin Morikawa birdies the last three holes to win.
- 2024: Nick Dunlap, who won The American Express as an amateur, earned his first win as a professional.

== Modified Stableford ==
Beginning in 2012, the tournament has used the Modified Stableford scoring system, last used in a PGA Tour event at the 2006 International in Colorado.

| Points | Strokes taken in relation to par |
|---|---|
| +8 | Double eagle (3 strokes under par) |
| +5 | Eagle (2 strokes under par) |
| +2 | Birdie (1 stroke under par) |
| 0 | Par |
| −1 | Bogey (1 stroke over par) |
| −3 | Double bogey or worse (2 strokes or more over par) |

This points scale encourages aggressive play, since the reward for scoring under par is higher than the penalty for scoring over par.

== Winners ==
| Year | Tour(s) (Note: EUR − European Tour; PGAT − PGA Tour.) | Winner | Score (Note: From 2012, the event was played using the modified stableford system.) | To par | Margin of victory | Runner(s)-up | Purse (US$) | Winner's share ($) |
Barracuda Championship
| 2025 | EUR, PGAT | (United States) Ryan Gerard | 47 points | | 3 points | (South Africa) Erik van Rooyen | 4,000,000 | 720,000 |
| 2024 | EUR, PGAT | (United States) Nick Dunlap | 49 points | | 2 points | (United States) Vince Whaley | 4,000,000 | 720,000 |
| 2023 | EUR, PGAT | (United States) Akshay Bhatia | 40 points | | Playoff | (United States) Patrick Rodgers | 3,800,000 | 684,000 |
| 2022 | EUR, PGAT | (United States) Chez Reavie | 43 points | | 1 point | (Sweden) Alex Norén | 3,700,000 | 666,000 |
| 2021 | PGAT | (South Africa) Erik van Rooyen | 50 points | | 5 points | (United States) Andrew Putnam | 3,500,000 | 630,000 |
| 2020 | PGAT | (United States) Richy Werenski | 39 points | | 1 point | (United States) Troy Merritt | 3,500,000 | 630,000 |
| 2019 | PGAT | (United States) Collin Morikawa | 47 points | | 3 points | (United States) Troy Merritt | 3,500,000 | 630,000 |
| 2018 | PGAT | (United States) Andrew Putnam | 47 points | | 4 points | (United States) Chad Campbell | 3,400,000 | 612,000 |
| 2017 | PGAT | (United States) Chris Stroud | 44 points | | Playoff | (England) Greg Owen (United States) Richy Werenski | 3,300,000 | 594,000 |
| 2016 | PGAT | (Australia) Greg Chalmers | 43 points | | 6 points | (United States) Gary Woodland | 3,200,000 | 576,000 |
| 2015 | PGAT | (United States) J. J. Henry (2) | 47 points | | Playoff | (United States) Kyle Reifers | 3,100,000 | 558,000 |
| 2014 | PGAT | (Australia) Geoff Ogilvy | 49 points | | 5 points | (United States) Justin Hicks | 3,000,000 | 540,000 |
Reno–Tahoe Open
| 2013 | PGAT | (United States) Gary Woodland | 44 points | | 9 points | (United States) Jonathan Byrd (Argentina) Andrés Romero | 3,000,000 | 540,000 |
| 2012 | PGAT | (United States) J. J. Henry | 43 points | | 1 point | (Brazil) Alexandre Rocha | 3,000,000 | 540,000 |
| 2011 | PGAT | (United States) Scott Piercy | 273 | −15 | 1 stroke | (United States) Pat Perez | 3,000,000 | 540,000 |
| 2010 | PGAT | (United States) Matt Bettencourt | 277 | −11 | 1 stroke | (United States) Bob Heintz | 3,000,000 | 540,000 |
Legends Reno–Tahoe Open
| 2009 | PGAT | (United States) John Rollins | 271 | −17 | 3 strokes | (Scotland) Martin Laird (United States) Jeff Quinney | 3,000,000 | 540,000 |
| 2008 | PGAT | (United States) Parker McLachlin | 270 | −18 | 7 strokes | (England) Brian Davis (United States) John Rollins | 3,000,000 | 540,000 |
Reno–Tahoe Open
| 2007 | PGAT | (United States) Steve Flesch | 273 | −15 | 5 strokes | (United States) Kevin Stadler (United States) Charles Warren | 3,000,000 | 540,000 |
| 2006 | PGAT | (United States) Will MacKenzie | 268 | −20 | 1 stroke | (United States) Bob Estes | 3,000,000 | 540,000 |
| 2005 | PGAT | (United States) Vaughn Taylor (2) | 267 | −21 | 3 strokes | (United States) Jonathan Kaye | 3,000,000 | 540,000 |
| 2004 | PGAT | (United States) Vaughn Taylor | 278 | −10 | Playoff | (Australia) Stephen Allan (United States) Hunter Mahan (United States) Scott McCarron | 3,000,000 | 540,000 |
| 2003 | PGAT | (United States) Kirk Triplett | 271 | −17 | 3 strokes | (United States) Tim Herron | 3,000,000 | 540,000 |
| 2002 | PGAT | (United States) Chris Riley | 271 | −17 | Playoff | (United States) Jonathan Kaye | 3,000,000 | 540,000 |
| 2001 | PGAT | (United States) John Cook | 271 | −17 | 1 stroke | (United States) Jerry Kelly | 3,000,000 | 540,000 |
| 2000 | PGAT | (United States) Scott Verplank | 275 | −13 | Playoff | (France) Jean van de Velde | 3,000,000 | 540,000 |
| 1999 | PGAT | (United States) Notah Begay III | 274 | −14 | 3 strokes | (United States) Chris Perry (United States) David Toms | 2,750,000 | 495,000 |

Note: Green highlight indicates scoring records.
