= Adam Long (golfer) =

American professional golfer (born 1987)

Personal information
- Full name: Adam Gordon Long
- Nationality: United States
- Born: September 25, 1987 (age 39) New Orleans, Louisiana, U.S.
- Height: 5 ft 10 in (1.78 m)
- Weight: 161 lb (73 kg; 11.5 st)
- Spouse: Emily Armstrong

Career
- Sport: Golf
- College: Duke University
- Turned professional: 2010
- Current tour: PGA Tour
- Former tours: PGA Tour Canada; PGA Tour Latinoamérica; Web.com Tour
- Professional wins: 2
- Highest ranking: 60 (September 27, 2020) (as of October 25, 2026)

Number of wins by tour
- PGA Tour: 1
- Other: 1

Best results in major championships
- Masters Tournament: CUT: 2019
- PGA Championship: T41: 2019
- U.S. Open: T13: 2020
- The Open Championship: CUT: 2021

Adam Gordon Long (born September 25, 1987) is an American professional golfer who won his first PGA Tour event at the 2019 Desert Classic.

== Early life ==
Long was born in New Orleans, and grew up in St. Louis. He is the son of Gordon and Jane and the brother of Lindsay. Growing up, Long played multiple sports, especially hockey, but after a leg injury, he focused on golf. He graduated from Francis Howell High School in 2006 and during his time there he was selected to the All-State All-Metro team all four years. In 2008, he won the Metropolitan Amateur Championship, a coveted Amateur title in St. Louis. Originally, Long had verbally committed to play golf at the University of Florida, but eventually decided on Duke University after a second visit.

== Collegiate career ==
Long started his career at Duke in 2006 and as a freshman, he was second on the team in stroke average (72.9). He had two top-10 finishes on his way to earning an All-ACC team selection. During his sophomore season, he earned three top-10 finishes including a performance at the Coca-Cola Duke Golf Classic where he broke the school's 54-hole record with a score of 208 (−8). In 2008, he was a Ping All-East Selection and led the Blue Devils in stroke average (73.0). Long finished his collegiate career ranking second in Duke's history in stroke average and earned All-America Academic honors for two seasons. He graduated from Duke in 2010 with a degree in Sociology.

== Professional career ==
Long turned professional in 2010 and played on different smaller tours like the NGA Hooters Tour and the eGolf Tour before earning status in 2014 on the PGA Tour Canada.

=== PGA Tour Canada ===
In 2014, Adam Long made 10 starts on the PGA Tour Canada. In those starts, he had two top-10 finishes coming at the Great Waterway Classic and the Cape Breton Celtic Classic where he finished T2 and T8 respectively.

=== Korn Ferry Tour ===
In 2012, Long played in 17 events on the Korn Ferry Tour and made the cut in six events. From 2015 to 2017, he played in 79 events on the Korn Ferry Tour, finishing inside the top-10 in 7 times including a runner-up finish at the 2015 United Leasing & Finance Championship.

In 2018, Long made 27 starts and finished high enough on the money list to earn his PGA Tour card. En route to earning his way onto the PGA Tour, he had four top-10 results including a runner-up finish at the Lincoln Land Championship. Long secured his PGA Tour card at the Ellie Mae Classic with a T4 finish. He finished 13th on the money list, winning $192,463.

=== PGA Tour ===
2019 was Long's first season on the PGA Tour. After making the cut in only one of his first four starts, Long won the 2019 Desert Classic with a score of 26 under par, beating out Phil Mickelson and Adam Hadwin in a close finish. Long followed up his win a few months later with a T10 finish at the Arnold Palmer Invitational. Long qualified for the FedEx Cup Playoffs in his first year on tour, ultimately finishing in 69th and earning $1,648,007.

In 2020, Long has finished tied for runner-up at the Mayakoba Golf Classic to Brendon Todd, solo 8th place at the Phoenix Open, and solo 2nd at the 3M Open to Michael Thompson. Long finished 31st on the FedEx Cup standings, falling one position shy of advancing to the Tour Championship.

In 2023, Long became the first PGA TOUR player in 31 years to hit every fairway (56/56) during a 72-hole tournament. He continued the streak the following week to 69 consecutive fairways, breaking the all-time PGA Tour record (previously set at 58). PGATOUR.COM

== Professional wins (2) ==
=== PGA Tour wins (1) ===
No.	Date	Tournament	Winning score	To par	Margin of victory	Runners-up
1	Jan 20, 2019	Desert Classic	63-71-63-65=262	−26	1 stroke	(Canada) Adam Hadwin, (United States) Phil Mickelson

=== NGA Hooters Tour wins (1) ===
- 2011 Woodcreek Open

== Results in major championships ==
Results not in chronological order in 2020.

Tournament	2011	2012	2013	2014	2015	2016	2017	2018
Masters Tournament								
U.S. Open	CUT							
The Open Championship								
PGA Championship								

Tournament	2019	2020	2021
Masters Tournament	CUT		
PGA Championship	T41	T51	CUT
U.S. Open		T13	
The Open Championship		NT	CUT

Did not play

CUT = missed the half-way cut
"T" = tied
NT = No tournament due to COVID-19 pandemic

== Results in The Players Championship ==
Tournament	2019	2020	2021	2022	2023
The Players Championship	T79	C	T22	T46	CUT

"T" indicates a tie for a place
CUT = missed the halfway cut
C = Canceled after the first round due to the COVID-19 pandemic

== Results in World Golf Championships ==
Tournament	2019	2020	2021
Championship			
Match Play		NT^{1}	T28
Invitational	T24		
Champions		NT^{1}	NT^{1}

^{1}Canceled due to COVID-19 pandemic

Did not play

"T" = Tied
NT = No tournament

== See also ==
- 2018 Web.com Tour Finals graduates
