= Marty Jertson =

American golfer

Personal information
- Nationality: United States
- Born: August 24, 1980 (age 46) Gallup, New Mexico, U.S.

Career
- Sport: Golf
- College: Colorado School of Mines
- Turned professional: 2002
- Professional wins: 2

Best results in major championships
- Masters Tournament: DNP
- PGA Championship: 82nd: 2019
- U.S. Open: CUT: 2020
- The Open Championship: DNP

Marty Jertson (born August 24, 1980) is an American professional golfer.

Jertson was born in Gallup, New Mexico. He played college golf at the Colorado School of Mines where he was an All-American in 2002. He turned professional in 2002.

Jertson is a member of the Southwest section of the PGA of America, which contains Arizona and Clark County, Nevada. He is the Vice President of Fitting & Performance for Ping, is credited with the design of many of the company's golf clubs, and is listed on over 125 patents. As a golf equipment manufacturer, Jertson is classified as an A-19 member.

Jertson finished 82nd at the 2019 PGA Championship, last of those who made the cut. It was his fourth time playing in the tournament. He has also played the Phoenix Open and made multiple appearances at the Shriners Hospitals for Children Open as winner of qualifiers for Southwest PGA professionals. Jertson also played in the 2020 U.S. Open via his 2019 PGA Professional Player of the Year ranking after the COVID-19 pandemic radically altered the field.

== Professional wins ==
- 2008 Southwest PGA Assistant Championship
- 2010 Southwest PGA Professional Championship

== Results in major championships ==
Results not in chronological order in 2020.

Tournament	2011	2012	2013	2014	2015	2016	2017	2018
Masters Tournament								
U.S. Open								
The Open Championship								
PGA Championship	CUT	CUT						CUT

Tournament	2019	2020
Masters Tournament		
PGA Championship	82	CUT
U.S. Open		CUT
The Open Championship		NT

Did not play

CUT = missed the half-way cut
NT = No tournament due to COVID-19 pandemic

== U.S. national team appearances ==
- PGA Cup: 2011 (winners), 2019 (winners)
