= Troy Merritt =

American professional golfer (born 1985)

Personal information
- Full name: Troy Brian Merritt
- Nationality: United States
- Born: October 25, 1985 (age 41) Osage, Iowa, U.S.
- Height: 6 ft 0 in (1.83 m)
- Weight: 160 lb (73 kg; 11 st)
- Spouse: Courtney Achter
- Children: 2

Career
- Sport: Golf
- College: Winona State University; Boise State University
- Turned professional: 2008
- Current tours: PGA Tour; Korn Ferry Tour
- Former tour: European Tour
- Professional wins: 3
- Highest ranking: 82 (March 20, 2016)

Number of wins by tour
- PGA Tour: 2
- Korn Ferry Tour: 1

Best results in major championships
- Masters Tournament: T42: 2016
- PGA Championship: T41: 2022
- U.S. Open: 58th: 2020
- The Open Championship: CUT: 2021

Troy Brian Merritt (born October 25, 1985) is an American professional golfer who has played on the PGA Tour and the Web.com Tour. He is a two-time winner on the PGA Tour, with his most recent win coming at the 2018 Barbasol Championship.

== Early life ==
Merritt was born in Osage, Iowa, but moved to Minnesota and played high school golf at Spring Lake Park. He played college golf at Winona State University until after his sophomore year, when he transferred to Boise State University. He was first team All-WAC for Boise State and tied the school-record for a low round score when he posted a 62 (-9) in the second round of the District VII Shootout.

== Professional career ==
Merritt turned professional in 2008. Merritt's first win on the Nationwide Tour came on September 6, 2009 when he won a $117,000 purse at the Mexico Open, beating Australia's Adam Bland with a 20-foot birdie putt on the first hole of a playoff.

On December 7, 2009, Merritt became only the third golfer to medal at the PGA Tour Qualifying Tournament by leading after every round. Despite a double-bogey on the final (108th) hole of the six round tournament he won by one stroke over veteran Jeff Maggert with a score of 22-under-par. In 2010, Merritt finished 125th on the PGA Tour, earning the final spot to retain a tour card.

On April 17, 2015, Merritt tied the course record at the Heritage on Hilton Head Island with a 10-under-par 61, matching David Frost's tournament mark set in 1994. Merritt shot his 61 after Jordan Spieth, the 2015 Masters champion, recovered from an opening-round 74 to shoot 62. Merritt finished the tournament behind Jim Furyk and Kevin Kisner, and earned $401,200 for finishing alone in third.

Merritt recorded his first PGA Tour win at the 2015 Quicken Loans National. He set a course record at Robert Trent Jones Golf Club with a 61 in the third round and held off all challengers to win by three shots at 18-under 266.

Merritt won his second PGA Tour event at the 2018 Barbasol Championship. He started with a 62 and a final round 67 gave him a one-stroke victory. The tournament was not completed until the Monday after bad weather during the tournament. Eleven days after his win Merritt underwent emergency surgery to remove a blood clot that stretched from his chest into his bicep.

In July 2021, Merritt shot 18-under par for 72 holes to tie with Cameron Davis and Joaquín Niemann for the lead at the Rocket Mortgage Classic. Niemann was eliminated with a bogey on the first playoff hole. Merritt ultimately bogeyed the fifth playoff hole and Davis won with a par.

== Personal life ==
Merritt currently resides in Boise, Idaho with his wife, Courtney Achter, and two sons.

== Professional wins (3) ==
=== PGA Tour wins (2) ===
No.	Date	Tournament	Winning score	Margin of victory	Runner(s)-up
1	Aug 2, 2015	Quicken Loans National	−18 (70-68-61-67=266)	3 strokes	(United States) Rickie Fowler
2	Jul 23, 2018	Barbasol Championship	−23 (62-67-69-67=265)	1 stroke	(United States) Billy Horschel, (United States) Tom Lovelady, (United States) Richy Werenski

PGA Tour playoff record (0–1)

No.	Year	Tournament	Opponents	Result
1	2021	Rocket Mortgage Classic	(Australia) Cameron Davis, (Chile) Joaquín Niemann	Davis won with par on fifth extra hole Niemann eliminated by par on first hole

=== Nationwide Tour wins (1) ===
No.	Date	Tournament	Winning score	Margin of victory	Runner-up
1	Sep 6, 2009	Mexico Open	−15 (69-68-67-69=273)	Playoff	(Australia) Adam Bland

Nationwide Tour playoff record (1–0)

No.	Year	Tournament	Opponent	Result
1	2009	Mexico Open	(Australia) Adam Bland	Won with birdie on first extra hole

== Results in major championships ==
Results not in chronological order in 2020.

Tournament	2015	2016	2017	2018
Masters Tournament		T42		
U.S. Open			CUT	
The Open Championship				
PGA Championship	T54	CUT		CUT

Tournament	2019	2020	2021	2022
Masters Tournament				
PGA Championship	CUT	CUT		T41
U.S. Open		58	T65	CUT
The Open Championship		NT	CUT	

Did not play

CUT = missed the half-way cut
"T" = tied
NT = No tournament due to COVID-19 pandemic

== Results in The Players Championship ==
Tournament	2010	2011	2012	2013	2014	2015	2016	2017	2018	2019
The Players Championship	68	T61				72	CUT	CUT		CUT

Tournament	2020	2021	2022	2023	2024
The Players Championship	C	CUT	T46	CUT	CUT

Did not play

CUT = missed the halfway cut
"T" indicates a tie for a place
C = Canceled after the first round due to the COVID-19 pandemic

== Results in World Golf Championships ==
Tournament	2015
Championship	
Match Play	
Invitational	77
Champions	

Did not play

== See also ==
- 2009 PGA Tour Qualifying School graduates
- 2013 Web.com Tour Finals graduates
- 2017 Web.com Tour Finals graduates
