= 2015 Players Championship =

Golf tournament

Tournament information
- Dates: May 7–10, 2015
- Location: Ponte Vedra Beach, Florida; 30.198°N 81.394°W
- Courses: TPC Sawgrass, Stadium Course
- Tour: PGA Tour

Statistics
- Par: 72
- Length: 7,215 yards (6,597 m)
- Field: 144 players, 75 after cut
- Cut: 144 (Even)
- Prize fund: $10.0 million
- Winner's share: $1.80 million

Champion
- (United States) Rickie Fowler
- 276 (−12), playoff
- Location in the United States Location in Florida

The 2015 Players Championship was a golf tournament in Florida on the PGA Tour, held May 7–10 at TPC Sawgrass in Ponte Vedra Beach, southeast of Jacksonville. It was the 42nd Players Championship.

Rickie Fowler won the tournament, beating Kevin Kisner and Sergio García in a playoff.

Trailing by five shots with six holes to play, Fowler played them at six-under-par, going birdie-par-birdie-eagle-birdie-birdie to force a playoff. After the three-hole aggregate playoff (holes 16–18) ended with Kisner and Fowler still tied, they returned to the 17th for sudden-death. Fowler put his tee shot to five feet (1.5 m) on the island green 17th, and made birdie to win.

Defending champion Martin Kaymer finished twelve strokes back at even par, tied for 56th place.

== Venue ==
This was the 34th Players Championship held at the TPC at Sawgrass Stadium Course and it remained at 7,215 yards (6,597 m).

=== Course layout ===
The 2015 Players Championship
Tee	Rating/Slope	1	2	3	4	5	6	7	8	9	Out	10	11	12	13	14	15	16	17	18	In	Total
Yards	76.8 / 155	423	532	177	384	471	393	442	237	583	3,642	424	558	358	181	481	449	523	137	462	3,573	7,215
Par		4	5	3	4	4	4	4	3	5	36	4	5	4	3	4	4	5	3	4	36	72

== Field ==
The field consisted of 144 players meeting the following criteria:

1. Winners of PGA Tour events since last Players

Bae Sang-moon (2), Ángel Cabrera (2), Alex Čejka, Ben Crane (2), Jason Day (2,6,8,12), Matt Every (2,8), Jim Furyk (2,8), Bill Haas (2,8), James Hahn (2), Brian Harman (2), Pádraig Harrington, Charley Hoffman (2,8,12), J. B. Holmes (2,8,12), Billy Horschel (2,7,8), Dustin Johnson (2,6,8,12), Martin Kaymer (2,4,5,8), Chris Kirk (2,8), Brooks Koepka (8), Hunter Mahan (2,8), Ben Martin (2), Hideki Matsuyama (2,8,12), Rory McIlroy (2,4,6,8), Ryan Moore (2,8,12), Geoff Ogilvy (2), Patrick Reed (2,6,8,12), Justin Rose (2,4,8), Adam Scott (2,4,8), Brandt Snedeker (2,7,8), Jordan Spieth (2,4,8,12), Robert Streb (2), Kevin Streelman (2), Nick Taylor, Brendon Todd (2,8), Camilo Villegas (2), Jimmy Walker (2,8,12), Bubba Watson (2,4,6,8,12)

- Tim Clark (2,5) did not play.

2. Top 125 from previous season's FedEx Cup points list

Robert Allenby, Aaron Baddeley, Ricky Barnes, Jonas Blixt, Jason Bohn, Steven Bowditch, Keegan Bradley (4,6,8), Scott Brown, Paul Casey (8), Kevin Chappell, K. J. Choi (5), Stewart Cink, Erik Compton, Brian Davis, Brendon de Jonge, Graham DeLaet, Luke Donald, Jason Dufner (4), Ernie Els (4), Harris English, Gonzalo Fernández-Castaño, Martin Flores, Rickie Fowler (8), Sergio García (8), Brice Garnett, Robert Garrigus, Retief Goosen, Luke Guthrie, Chesson Hadley, David Hearn, Russell Henley (8), Morgan Hoffmann, Charles Howell III, John Huh, Billy Hurley III, Ryo Ishikawa, Freddie Jacobson, Zach Johnson (8), Matt Jones, Jerry Kelly, Kevin Kisner, Russell Knox, Jason Kokrak, Matt Kuchar (5,6,8), Scott Langley, Danny Lee, Marc Leishman, Justin Leonard, Will MacKenzie, Graeme McDowell (4,8), William McGirt, George McNeill, Troy Merritt, Phil Mickelson (4,8), Bryce Molder, Kevin Na (8), Noh Seung-yul, Louis Oosthuizen (4,8), Jeff Overton, Ryan Palmer (8), Pat Perez, Carl Pettersson, Ian Poulter (6,8), Michael Putnam, Andrés Romero, Rory Sabbatini, Charl Schwartzel (4,8), John Senden, Webb Simpson (4,8), Vijay Singh, Scott Stallings, Brendan Steele, Shawn Stefani, Henrik Stenson (7,8), Steve Stricker, Chris Stroud, Brian Stuard, Daniel Summerhays, Andrew Svoboda, Michael Thompson, David Toms, Cameron Tringale, Bo Van Pelt, Jhonattan Vegas, Nick Watney, Boo Weekley, Lee Westwood (8), Tim Wilkinson, Gary Woodland

- Stuart Appleby, Justin Hicks, and Kevin Stadler did not play.

3. Top 125 from current season - Medical Extension

Spencer Levin, Scott Piercy

4. Major champions from the past five years

Darren Clarke

5. Players Championship winners from the past five years

Tiger Woods (6)

6. WGC winners from the past three years

7. The Tour Championship winners from the past three years

8. Top 50 from the Official World Golf Ranking

Jamie Donaldson, Stephen Gallacher, Branden Grace, Thongchai Jaidee, Anirban Lahiri, Shane Lowry, Joost Luiten, Bernd Wiesberger, Danny Willett

- Victor Dubuisson did not play.

9. Senior Players champion from prior year

Bernhard Langer

10. Web.com Tour money leader from prior season

Adam Hadwin

11. Money leader during the Web.com Tour Finals

Derek Fathauer

12. Top 10 current year FedEx Cup points leaders

13. Remaining positions and alternates filled through current year FedEx Cup standings

Daniel Berger, Sean O'Hair, Justin Thomas

== Round summaries ==
=== First round ===
Thursday, May 7, 2015

Place	Player	Score	To par
T1	(Canada) David Hearn	67	−5
T1	(United States) Charley Hoffman	67	−5
T1	(Japan) Hideki Matsuyama	67	−5
T1	(United States) Kevin Na	67	−5
T5	(United States) Derek Fathauer	68	−4
T5	(United States) Billy Horschel	68	−4
T5	(United States) Charles Howell III	68	−4
T5	(United States) Ben Martin	68	−4
T5	(United States) Troy Merritt	68	−4
T5	(United States) Brendon Todd	68	−4

=== Second round ===
Friday, May 8, 2015

Place	Player	Score	To par
T1	(United States) Jerry Kelly	71-65=136	−8
T1	(United States) Kevin Na	67-69=136	−8
T3	(United States) Rickie Fowler	69-69=138	−6
T3	(South Africa) Branden Grace	71-67=138	−6
T3	(Canada) David Hearn	67-71=138	−6
T3	(United States) Chris Kirk	70-68=138	−6
T7	(United States) Scott Brown	72-67=139	−5
T7	(United States) Bill Haas	72-67=139	−5
T7	(United States) Zach Johnson	71-68=139	−5
T7	(United States) Ben Martin	68-71=139	−5
T7	(United States) Troy Merritt	68-71=139	−5
T7	(United States) Chris Stroud	70-69=139	−5

=== Third round ===
Saturday, May 9, 2015

Place	Player	Score	To par
1	(United States) Chris Kirk	70-68-68=206	−10
T2	(United States) Bill Haas	72-67-68=207	−9
T2	(United States) Kevin Kisner	73-67-67=207	−9
T2	(United States) Ben Martin	68-71-68=207	−9
T5	(United States) Scott Brown	72-67-69=208	−8
T5	(Spain) Sergio García	69-72-67=208	−8
T5	(Canada) David Hearn	67-71-70=208	−8
T5	(United States) Jerry Kelly	71-65-72=208	−8
T5	(United States) Kevin Na	67-69-72=208	−8
T5	(United States) Justin Thomas	73-70-65=208	−8

=== Final round ===
Sunday, May 10, 2015

Champion
(c) = past champion

Place	Player	Score	To par	Money ($)
T1	(United States) Rickie Fowler	69-69-71-67=276	−12	Playoff
T1	(Spain) Sergio García (c)	69-72-67-68=276	−12	Playoff
T1	(United States) Kevin Kisner	73-67-67-69=276	−12	Playoff
T4	(United States) Bill Haas	72-67-68-70=277	−11	440,000
T4	(United States) Ben Martin	68-71-68-70=277	−11	440,000
T6	(United States) Kevin Na	67-69-72-71=279	−9	347,500
T6	(South Africa) Rory Sabbatini	70-71-69-69=279	−9	347,500
T8	(Wales) Jamie Donaldson	70-72-71-67=280	−8	270,000
T8	(United States) Brian Harman	71-69-70-70=280	−8	270,000
T8	(Japan) Ryo Ishikawa	71-69-69-71=280	−8	270,000
T8	(Northern Ireland) Rory McIlroy	69-71-70-70=280	−8	270,000
T8	(Australia) John Senden	73-70-67-70=280	−8	270,000

Leaderboard below the top 10
Place	Player	Score	To par	Money ($)
T13	(United States) Billy Horschel	68-72-69-72=281	−7	187,500
T13	(United States) Zach Johnson	71-68-71-71=281	−7	187,500
T13	(United States) Chris Kirk	70-68-68-75=281	−7	187,500
T13	(United States) David Toms	73-71-68-69=281	−7	187,500
T17	(United States) Derek Fathauer	68-72-69-73=282	−6	130,857
T17	(United States) Jerry Kelly	71-65-72-74=282	−6	130,857
T17	(Scotland) Russell Knox	72-70-72-68=282	−6	130,857
T17	(Japan) Hideki Matsuyama	67-74-72-69=282	−6	130,857
T17	(United States) George McNeill	73-70-69-70=282	−6	130,857
T17	(United States) Pat Perez	71-70-68-73=282	−6	130,857
T17	(Sweden) Henrik Stenson (c)	72-69-73-68=282	−6	130,857
T24	(United States) Chesson Hadley	71-72-66-74=283	−5	81,000
T24	(United States) Russell Henley	70-70-72-71=283	−5	81,000
T24	(Australia) Marc Leishman	69-71-74-69=283	−5	81,000
T24	(Australia) Geoff Ogilvy	72-72-69-70=283	−5	81,000
T24	(United States) Patrick Reed	72-70-69-72=283	−5	81,000
T24	(United States) Justin Thomas	73-70-65-75=283	−5	81,000
T30	(South Korea) Bae Sang-moon	72-68-73-71=284	−4	58,125
T30	(United States) Scott Brown	72-67-69-76=284	−4	58,125
T30	(United States) Erik Compton	74-70-72-68=284	−4	58,125
T30	(United States) James Hahn	70-73-72-69=284	−4	58,125
T30	(United States) Charley Hoffman	67-74-71-72=284	−4	58,125
T30	(England) Ian Poulter	71-69-70-74=284	−4	58,125
T30	(United States) Robert Streb	70-73-72-69=284	−4	58,125
T30	(United States) Bo Van Pelt	70-72-69-73=284	−4	58,125
T38	(United States) Martin Flores	73-71-67-74=285	−3	44,000
T38	(Scotland) Stephen Gallacher	72-70-70-73=285	−3	44,000
T38	(Australia) Adam Scott (c)	72-69-69-75=285	−3	44,000
T38	(United States) Steve Stricker	69-75-69-72=285	−3	44,000
T42	(South Korea) K. J. Choi (c)	70-74-70-72=286	−2	31,400
T42	(United States) Matt Every	74-70-70-72=286	−2	31,400
T42	(South Africa) Branden Grace	71-67-73-75=286	−2	31,400
T42	(Republic of Ireland) Pádraig Harrington	71-73-75-67=286	−2	31,400
T42	(Canada) David Hearn	67-71-70-78=286	−2	31,400
T42	(Sweden) Freddie Jacobson	70-74-70-72=286	−2	31,400
T42	(United States) Chris Stroud	70-69-76-71=286	−2	31,400
T42	(Venezuela) Jhonattan Vegas	75-69-66-76=286	−2	31,400
T42	(United States) Bubba Watson	71-70-69-76=286	−2	31,400
T51	(United States) Luke Guthrie	74-69-69-75=287	−1	23,680
T51	(United States) J. B. Holmes	70-71-73-73=287	−1	23,680
T51	(Netherlands) Joost Luiten	71-70-71-75=287	−1	23,680
T51	(South Africa) Charl Schwartzel	71-72-72-72=287	−1	23,680
T51	(United States) Brendon Todd	68-72-75-72=287	−1	23,680
T56	(Australia) Robert Allenby	70-72-73-73=288	E	22,200
T56	(Canada) Graham DeLaet	75-69-70-74=288	E	22,200
T56	(United States) Jim Furyk	70-70-73-75=288	E	22,200
T56	(United States) Charles Howell III	68-72-71-77=288	E	22,200
T56	(Germany) Martin Kaymer (c)	69-72-71-76=288	E	22,200
T56	(Northern Ireland) Graeme McDowell	73-70-74-71=288	E	22,200
T56	(United States) Cameron Tringale	69-71-72-76=288	E	22,200
T63	(Zimbabwe) Brendon de Jonge	73-71-71-74=289	+1	21,200
T63	(United States) Bryce Molder	72-71-75-71=289	+1	21,200
T63	(Fiji) Vijay Singh	71-72-76-70=289	+1	21,200
T66	(South Africa) Ernie Els	73-70-76-71=290	+2	20,600
T66	(United States) Scott Langley	72-72-71-75=290	+2	20,600
T66	(United States) Webb Simpson	69-74-78-69=290	+2	20,600
T69	(United States) Dustin Johnson	72-72-75-72=291	+3	20,000
T69	(South Africa) Louis Oosthuizen	70-73-75-73=291	+3	20,000
T69	(United States) Tiger Woods (c)	73-71-75-72=291	+3	20,000
72	(United States) Troy Merritt	68-71-76-77=292	+4	19,600
73	(Canada) Nick Taylor	72-70-72-79=293	+5	19,400
74	(Germany) Alex Čejka	69-73-79-78=299	+11	19,200
75	(United States) Scott Stallings	71-72-82-76=301	+13	19,000
CUT	(United States) Daniel Berger	71-74=145	+1	
CUT	(United States) Jason Bohn	71-74=145	+1	
CUT	(United States) Keegan Bradley	77-68=145	+1	
CUT	(Spain) Gonzalo Fernández-Castaño	74-71=145	+1	
CUT	(United States) Morgan Hoffmann	76-69=145	+1	
CUT	(United States) Brooks Koepka	78-67=145	+1	
CUT	(United States) Jason Kokrak	69-76=145	+1	
CUT	(United States) Matt Kuchar (c)	73-72=145	+1	
CUT	(United States) Spencer Levin	70-75=145	+1	
CUT	(United States) Ryan Moore	73-72=145	+1	
CUT	(United States) Michael Putnam	72-73=145	+1	
CUT	(England) Justin Rose	71-74=145	+1	
CUT	(United States) Brendan Steele	73-72=145	+1	
CUT	(Austria) Bernd Wiesberger	77-68=145	+1	
CUT	(United States) Ricky Barnes	69-77=146	+2	
CUT	(United States) Jason Dufner	73-73=146	+2	
CUT	(United States) Harris English	75-71=146	+2	
CUT	(United States) Billy Hurley III	74-72=146	+2	
CUT	(Germany) Bernhard Langer	73-73=146	+2	
CUT	(New Zealand) Danny Lee	73-73=146	+2	
CUT	(United States) Justin Leonard (c)	73-73=146	+2	
CUT	(United States) Jeff Overton	69-77=146	+2	
CUT	(United States) Andrew Svoboda	71-75=146	+2	
CUT	(United States) Jimmy Walker	71-75=146	+2	
CUT	(United States) Boo Weekley	73-73=146	+2	
CUT	(England) Lee Westwood	76-70=146	+2	
CUT	(England) Danny Willett	72-74=146	+2	
CUT	(Australia) Steven Bowditch	77-70=147	+3	
CUT	(United States) Ben Crane	71-76=147	+3	
CUT	(United States) John Huh	74-73=147	+3	
CUT	(Republic of Ireland) Shane Lowry	73-74=147	+3	
CUT	(United States) Hunter Mahan	72-75=147	+3	
CUT	(United States) Scott Piercy	73-74=147	+3	
CUT	(United States) Brandt Snedeker	69-78=147	+3	
CUT	(United States) Jordan Spieth	75-72=147	+3	
CUT	(United States) Shawn Stefani	77-70=147	+3	
CUT	(United States) Michael Thompson	73-74=147	+3	
CUT	(United States) Stewart Cink	76-72=148	+4	
CUT	(Thailand) Thongchai Jaidee	73-75=148	+4	
CUT	(India) Anirban Lahiri	76-72=148	+4	
CUT	(United States) William McGirt	75-73=148	+4	
CUT	(South Korea) Noh Seung-yul	73-75=148	+4	
CUT	(Argentina) Andrés Romero	72-76=148	+4	
CUT	(United States) Kevin Chappell	77-72=149	+5	
CUT	(England) Brian Davis	75-74=149	+5	
CUT	(Canada) Adam Hadwin	75-74=149	+5	
CUT	(United States) Phil Mickelson (c)	73-76=149	+5	
CUT	(United States) Ryan Palmer	77-72=149	+5	
CUT	(United States) Kevin Streelman	75-74=149	+5	
CUT	(United States) Nick Watney	78-71=149	+5	
CUT	(Australia) Jason Day	69-81=150	+6	
CUT	(United States) Will MacKenzie	75-75=150	+6	
CUT	(New Zealand) Tim Wilkinson	73-77=150	+6	
CUT	(United States) Brice Garnett	76-75=151	+7	
CUT	(South Africa) Retief Goosen	78-73=151	+7	
CUT	(Australia) Matt Jones	75-76=151	+7	
CUT	(United States) Sean O'Hair	76-76=152	+8	
CUT	(Colombia) Camilo Villegas	78-74=152	+8	
CUT	(England) Luke Donald	77-76=153	+9	
CUT	(United States) Robert Garrigus	75-78=153	+9	
CUT	(United States) Brian Stuard	74-79=153	+9	
CUT	(United States) Daniel Summerhays	75-78=153	+9	
CUT	(United States) Gary Woodland	79-74=153	+9	
CUT	(Australia) Aaron Baddeley	78-77=155	+11	
CUT	(Sweden) Jonas Blixt	77-80=157	+13	
WD	(Argentina) Ángel Cabrera	75	+3	
WD	(Sweden) Carl Pettersson	77	+5	
WD	(England) Paul Casey	79	+7	
WD	(Northern Ireland) Darren Clarke			

==== Scorecard ====
Final round

Hole	1	2	3	4	5	6	7	8	9	10	11	12	13	14	15	16	17	18
Par	4	5	3	4	4	4	4	3	5	4	5	4	3	4	4	5	3	4
(United States) Fowler	−6	−6	−6	−6	−6	−6	−7	−7	−7	−6	−6	−6	−7	−7	−8	−10	−11	−12
(Spain) García	−7	−8	−8	−9	−10	−11	−11	−11	−11	−11	−11	−11	−11	−10	−10	−11	−12	−12
(United States) Kisner	−9	−10	−10	−9	−8	−9	−9	−9	−9	−9	−9	−10	−10	−10	−10	−11	−12	−12
(United States) Haas	−9	−9	−10	−10	−10	−10	−9	−8	−7	−8	−8	−8	−8	−9	−10	−11	−11	−11
(United States) Martin	−9	−10	−10	−10	−9	−9	−9	−9	−8	−9	−10	−10	−10	−9	−10	−11	−12	−11
(United States) Na	−8	−8	−8	−6	−6	−7	−8	−8	−8	−8	−8	−8	−8	−9	−9	−10	−10	−9
(South Africa) Sabbatini	−6	−6	−6	−6	−6	−7	−7	−7	−7	−8	−8	−8	−8	−8	−8	−8	−9	−9
(United States) Kirk	−10	−10	−10	−9	−8	−8	−9	−9	−9	−9	−9	−9	−9	−8	−7	−7	−7	−7

Cumulative tournament scores, relative to par

Eagle	Birdie	Bogey	Double bogey

==== Playoff ====
The playoff was the first at The Players to use the three-hole aggregate format, adopted the prior year, which began at par-5 16th hole. After the three holes, Fowler and Kisner were tied, but García missed his birdie putt on 18 to continue and was eliminated. The same three holes were scheduled for sudden-death, but started at the par-3 17th, which both had birdied twice Sunday. Fowler birdied it again (his fifth on the 17th hole in six attempts for the week) to win the title. The birdies were a first for the Players; its four previous playoffs, all sudden-death, had no under-par scoring.

Place	Player	Three-hole		Sudden-death		Money ($)
Place	Player	Score	To par	Score	To par	Money ($)
1	(United States) Rickie Fowler	5-2-4=11	−1	2	−1	1,800,000
T2	(United States) Kevin Kisner	5-2-4=11	−1	3	E	880,000
T2	(Spain) Sergio García	5-3-5=13	+1			880,000

- After a failed birdie putt on 18 to remain in the playoff, García missed an attempted one-handed tap-in, so his score for the hole was recorded as a bogey.

===== Scorecard =====
Hole	16	17	18	17
Par	5	3	4	3
(United States) Fowler	E	−1	−1	−2
(United States) Kisner	E	−1	−1	−1
(Spain) García	E	E	+1	

Cumulative playoff scores, relative to par

Birdie	Bogey
