= 2019 WGC-Dell Technologies Match Play =

- Advertisement for the final day's play featuring winner Kevin Kisner, runner up Matt Kuchar, and losing semi finalists Francesco Molinari and Lucas Bjerregaard.

Tournament information
- Dates: March 27–31, 2019
- Location: Austin, Texas, U.S. 30.343°N 97.797°W
- Course: Austin Country Club
- Tours: PGA Tour; European Tour; Japan Golf Tour
- Format: Match play – 18 holes

Statistics
- Par: 71
- Length: 7,108 yards (6,500 m)
- Field: 64 players
- Prize fund: $10,250,00 €9,125,710
- Winner's share: $1,745,000 €$1,553,597

Champion
- (United States) Kevin Kisner
- def. Matt Kuchar 3 & 2
- Location in the United States Location in Texas

The 2019 WGC-Dell Technologies Match Play was the 21st WGC Match Play, played March 27–31 at Austin Country Club in Austin, Texas. It was the second of four World Golf Championships in 2019.

Kevin Kisner, runner-up in 2018, defeated 2013 champion Matt Kuchar in the final, 3 & 2.

== Course layout ==
Austin Country Club

Hole	1	2	3	4	5	6	7	8	9	Out	10	11	12	13	14	15	16	17	18	In	Total
Yards	394	470	440	185	370	590	201	498	490	3,638	393	194	578	317	465	440	585	150	368	3,490	7,128
Par	4	4	4	3	4	5	3	4	4	35	4	3	5	4	4	4	5	3	4	36	71

== Field ==
The field consisted of the top 64 players available from the Official World Golf Ranking on March 17. However, the seedings were based on the World Rankings on March 24.

Rickie Fowler (ranked 8th on March 17, personal reasons) and Adam Scott (29th, personal reasons) did not compete, allowing entry for Satoshi Kodaira (65th) and Luke List (66th).

== Format ==
The first phase of the tournament involves players being split into 16 groups of four players. Each group is decided by a round-robin format played over Wednesday to Friday, with the sixteen group winners advancing to the knock out phase. The group winner is decided by awarding 1 point for a win, and ½ point for a halved match. If two or more players are tied on points at the conclusion of the group phase, sudden death stroke play playoff is played between tied players.

The group winners play the round of sixteen on Saturday morning, and the quarterfinal on Saturday afternoon. The semifinals are played on Sunday morning, and the final and third place playoff are played on Sunday afternoon. In total, the winner will play seven rounds of golf.

Pool A

Seed	Player	OWGR
1	(United States) Dustin Johnson	1
2	(England) Justin Rose	2
3	(United States) Brooks Koepka	3
4	(Northern Ireland) Rory McIlroy	4
5	(United States) Justin Thomas	5
6	(United States) Bryson DeChambeau	6
7	(Italy) Francesco Molinari	7
8	(Spain) Jon Rahm	8
9	(United States) Xander Schauffele	9
10	(England) Paul Casey	11
11	(England) Tommy Fleetwood	12
12	(Australia) Jason Day	13
13	(United States) Tiger Woods	14
14	(United States) Tony Finau	15
15	(United States) Bubba Watson	16
16	(United States) Patrick Reed	17

Pool B

Seed	Player	OWGR
17	(Australia) Marc Leishman	18
18	(United States) Patrick Cantlay	19
19	(South Africa) Louis Oosthuizen	20
20	(United States) Phil Mickelson	21
21	(United States) Webb Simpson	22
22	(United States) Gary Woodland	23
23	(United States) Matt Kuchar	24
24	(Japan) Hideki Matsuyama	25
25	(Australia) Cameron Smith	26
26	(Spain) Sergio García	27
27	(Sweden) Alex Norén	28
28	(United States) Jordan Spieth	30
29	(Spain) Rafa Cabrera-Bello	31
30	(England) Ian Poulter	32
31	(United States) Keegan Bradley	33
32	(England) Matt Fitzpatrick	34

Pool C

Seed	Player	OWGR
33	(England) Matt Wallace	35
34	(England) Eddie Pepperell	36
35	(England) Tyrrell Hatton	37
36	(China) Li Haotong	38
37	(Sweden) Henrik Stenson	39
38	(United States) Billy Horschel	40
39	(Thailand) Kiradech Aphibarnrat	41
40	(South Africa) Branden Grace	42
41	(United States) Kyle Stanley	43
42	(United States) Charles Howell III	44
43	(United States) J. B. Holmes	45
44	(United States) Brandt Snedeker	46
45	(Denmark) Thorbjørn Olesen	47
46	(Republic of Ireland) Shane Lowry	48
47	(South Africa) Justin Harding	49
48	(United States) Kevin Kisner	50

Pool D

Seed	Player	OWGR
49	(South Korea) An Byeong-hun	51
50	(Denmark) Lucas Bjerregaard	52
51	(United States) Andrew Putnam	53
52	(United States) Jim Furyk	54
53	(Argentina) Emiliano Grillo	55
54	(South Korea) Kim Si-woo	56
55	(United States) Chez Reavie	57
56	(United States) Keith Mitchell	58
57	(United States) Kevin Na	60
58	(Mexico) Abraham Ancer	61
59	(Scotland) Russell Knox	62
60	(England) Tom Lewis	63
61	(United States) Aaron Wise	64
62	(England) Lee Westwood	65
63	(Japan) Satoshi Kodaira	67
64	(United States) Luke List	69

== Results ==
=== Pool play ===
Players were divided into 16 groups of four players and play round-robin matches Wednesday to Friday.

- Round 1 – March 27
- Round 2 – March 28
- Round 3 – March 29

Group 1
Round	Winner	Score	Loser
1	Johnson	4 & 3	Reavie
1	Grace	4 & 3	Matsuyama
2	Grace	1 up	Johnson
2	Matsuyama vs Reavie – halved		
3	Matsuyama	4 & 2	Johnson
3	Grace	2 & 1	Reavie

Seed	Player	W	L	H	Points	Finish
40	(South Africa) Branden Grace	3	0	0	3	1
24	(Japan) Hideki Matsuyama	1	1	1	1.5	2
1	(United States) Dustin Johnson	1	2	0	1	3
55	(United States) Chez Reavie	0	2	1	0.5	4

Group 2
Round	Winner	Score	Loser
1	Rose	2 & 1	Grillo
1	Woodland	2 & 1	Pepperell
2	Rose vs Pepperell – halved		
2	Woodland	1 up	Grillo
3	Rose	1 up	Woodland
3	Grillo	4 & 3	Pepperell

Seed	Player	W	L	H	Points	Finish
2	(England) Justin Rose	2	0	1	2.5	1
22	(United States) Gary Woodland	2	1	0	2	2
53	(Argentina) Emiliano Grillo	1	2	0	1	3
34	(England) Eddie Pepperell	0	2	1	0.5	4

Group 3
Round	Winner	Score	Loser
1	Koepka vs Lewis – halved		
1	Li	5 & 4	Norén
2	Li	1 up	Koepka
2	Norén	4 & 2	Lewis
3	Norén	3 & 2	Koepka
3	Lewis	1 up	Li

Seed	Player	W	L	H	Points	Finish
36	(China) Li Haotong	2	1	0	2	1
27	(Sweden) Alex Norén	2	1	0	2	2
60	(England) Tom Lewis	1	1	1	1.5	3
3	(United States) Brooks Koepka	0	2	1	0.5	4

- Li defeated Norén on the first hole of a
  sudden-death playoff with a birdie.

Group 4
Round	Winner	Score	Loser
1	McIlroy	5 & 4	List
1	Harding	1 up	Fitzpatrick
2	McIlroy	3 & 2	Harding
2	List	2 & 1	Fitzpatrick
3	McIlroy	4 & 2	Fitzpatrick
3	Harding	2 up	List

Seed	Player	W	L	H	Points	Finish
4	(Northern Ireland) Rory McIlroy	3	0	0	3	1
47	(South Africa) Justin Harding	2	1	0	2	2
64	(United States) Luke List	1	2	0	1	3
32	(England) Matt Fitzpatrick	0	3	0	0	4

Group 5
Round	Winner	Score	Loser
1	Bjerregaard	3 & 2	Thomas
1	Wallace	1 up	Bradley
2	Thomas	3 & 1	Wallace
2	Bradley vs Bjerregaard – halved		
3	Thomas vs Bradley – halved		
3	Bjerregaard	1 up	Wallace

Seed	Player	W	L	H	Points	Finish
50	(Denmark) Lucas Bjerregaard	2	0	1	2.5	1
5	(United States) Justin Thomas	1	1	1	1.5	2
33	(England) Matt Wallace	1	2	0	1	T3
31	(United States) Keegan Bradley	0	1	2	1	T3

Group 6
Round	Winner	Score	Loser
1	DeChambeau	3 & 1	Knox
1	Leishman	2 up	Aphibarnrat
2	Aphibarnrat	2 & 1	DeChambeau
2	Leishman	2 up	Knox
3	Leishman	5 & 4	DeChambeau
3	Knox	2 up	Aphibarnrat

Seed	Player	W	L	H	Points	Finish
17	(Australia) Marc Leishman	3	0	0	3	1
6	(United States) Bryson DeChambeau	1	2	0	1	T2
39	(Thailand) Kiradech Aphibarnrat	1	2	0	1	T2
59	(Scotland) Russell Knox	1	2	0	1	T2

Group 7
Round	Winner	Score	Loser
1	Molinari	5 & 4	Kodaira
1	Olesen	2 & 1	Simpson
2	Molinari	4 & 3	Olesen
2	Simpson vs Kodaira – halved		
3	Molinari	2 & 1	Simpson
3	Kodaira	2 & 1	Olesen

Seed	Player	W	L	H	Points	Finish
7	(Italy) Francesco Molinari	3	0	0	3	1
63	(Japan) Satoshi Kodaira	1	1	1	1.5	2
45	(Denmark) Thorbjørn Olesen	1	2	0	1	3
21	(United States) Webb Simpson	0	2	1	0.5	4

Group 8
Round	Winner	Score	Loser
1	Rahm	7 & 5	Kim
1	Kuchar	3 & 1	Holmes
2	Holmes	2 & 1	Rahm
2	Kuchar	6 & 4	Kim
3	Rahm vs Kuchar – halved		
3	Holmes	6 & 4	Kim

Seed	Player	W	L	H	Points	Finish
23	(United States) Matt Kuchar	2	0	1	2.5	1
43	(United States) J. B. Holmes	2	1	0	2	2
8	(Spain) Jon Rahm	1	1	1	1.5	3
54	(South Korea) Kim Si-woo	0	3	0	0	4

Group 9
Round	Winner	Score	Loser
1	Schauffele	1 up	Westwood
1	Hatton	4 & 3	Cabrera-Bello
2	Schauffele vs Hatton – halved		
2	Cabrera-Bello vs Westwood – halved		
3	Cabrera-Bello	1 up	Schauffele
3	Hatton	3 & 1	Westwood

Seed	Player	W	L	H	Points	Finish
35	(England) Tyrrell Hatton	2	0	1	2.5	1
9	(United States) Xander Schauffele	1	1	1	1.5	T2
29	(Spain) Rafa Cabrera-Bello	1	1	1	1.5	T2
62	(England) Lee Westwood	0	2	1	0.5	4

Group 10
Round	Winner	Score	Loser
1	Casey	5 & 3	Ancer
1	Howell III	2 & 1	Smith
2	Casey vs Howell III – halved		
2	Ancer	3 & 2	Smith
3	Casey	4 & 3	Smith
3	Ancer	5 & 3	Howell III

Seed	Player	W	L	H	Points	Finish
10	(England) Paul Casey	2	0	1	2.5	1
58	(Mexico) Abraham Ancer	2	1	0	2	2
42	(United States) Charles Howell III	1	1	1	1.5	3
25	(Australia) Cameron Smith	0	3	0	0	4

Group 11
Round	Winner	Score	Loser
1	Fleetwood	3 & 2	An
1	Stanley	3 & 2	Oosthuizen
2	Fleetwood vs Stanley – halved		
2	Oosthuizen	1 up	An
3	Oosthuizen	4 & 3	Fleetwood
3	An	6 & 5	Stanley

Seed	Player	W	L	H	Points	Finish
19	(South Africa) Louis Oosthuizen	2	1	0	2	1
11	(England) Tommy Fleetwood	1	1	1	1.5	T2
41	(United States) Kyle Stanley	1	1	1	1.5	T2
49	(South Korea) An Byeong-hun	1	2	0	1	4

Group 12
Round	Winner	Score	Loser
1	Furyk	2 up	Day
1	Stenson	2 & 1	Mickelson
2	Stenson	4 & 3	Day
2	Furyk	1 up	Mickelson
3	Mickelson	2 up	Day
3	Stenson	5 & 4	Furyk

Seed	Player	W	L	H	Points	Finish
37	(Sweden) Henrik Stenson	3	0	0	3	1
52	(United States) Jim Furyk	2	1	0	2	2
20	(United States) Phil Mickelson	1	2	0	1	3
12	(Australia) Jason Day	0	3	0	0	4

Group 13
Round	Winner	Score	Loser
1	Woods	3 & 1	Wise
1	Cantlay vs Snedeker – halved		
2	Snedeker	2 & 1	Woods
2	Cantlay	4 & 2	Wise
3	Woods	4 & 2	Cantlay
3	Wise	6 & 4	Snedeker

Seed	Player	W	L	H	Points	Finish
13	(United States) Tiger Woods	2	1	0	2	1
18	(United States) Patrick Cantlay	1	1	1	1.5	T2
44	(United States) Brandt Snedeker	1	1	1	1.5	T2
61	(United States) Aaron Wise	1	2	0	1	4

Group 14
Round	Winner	Score	Loser
1	Finau	2 & 1	Mitchell
1	Poulter	2 up	Kisner
2	Kisner	2 up	Finau
2	Mitchell	1 up	Poulter
3	Poulter	1 up	Finau
3	Kisner	2 & 1	Mitchell

Seed	Player	W	L	H	Points	Finish
48	(United States) Kevin Kisner	2	1	0	2	1
30	(England) Ian Poulter	2	1	0	2	2
14	(United States) Tony Finau	1	2	0	1	T3
56	(United States) Keith Mitchell	1	2	0	1	T3

- Kisner defeated Poulter on the third hole of a
  sudden-death playoff with a birdie.

Group 15
Round	Winner	Score	Loser
1	Na	1 up	Watson
1	Spieth vs Horschel – halved		
2	Horschel	2 & 1	Watson
2	Spieth	3 & 2	Na
3	Watson	1 up	Spieth
3	Na	3 & 1	Horschel

Seed	Player	W	L	H	Points	Finish
57	(United States) Kevin Na	2	1	0	2	1
28	(United States) Jordan Spieth	1	1	1	1.5	T2
38	(United States) Billy Horschel	1	1	1	1.5	T2
15	(United States) Bubba Watson	1	2	0	1	4

Group 16
Round	Winner	Score	Loser
1	Putnam	3 & 2	Reed
1	García	4 & 2	Lowry
2	Reed vs Lowry – halved		
2	García	5 & 4	Putnam
3	Reed	2 & 1	García
3	Lowry	3 & 2	Putnam

Seed	Player	W	L	H	Points	Finish
26	(Spain) Sergio García	2	1	0	2	1
16	(United States) Patrick Reed	1	1	1	1.5	T2
46	(Republic of Ireland) Shane Lowry	1	1	1	1.5	T2
51	(United States) Andrew Putnam	1	2	0	1	4

=== Final 16 bracket ===
Round of 16 — 18 holes March 30 – morning
40	(South Africa) Branden Grace
26	(Spain) Sergio García	1 up
23	(United States) Matt Kuchar	4&3
35	(England) Tyrrell Hatton
4	(Northern Ireland) Rory McIlroy
13	(United States) Tiger Woods	2&1
50	(Denmark) Lucas Bjerregaard	3&2
37	(Sweden) Henrik Stenson
2	(England) Justin Rose
57	(United States) Kevin Na	2 up
7	(Italy) Francesco Molinari	5&4
10	(England) Paul Casey
36	(China) Li Haotong
48	(United States) Kevin Kisner	6&5
17	(Australia) Marc Leishman
19	(South Africa) Louis Oosthuizen	2&1

Quarterfinals — 18 holes March 30 – afternoon
26	(Spain) Sergio García
23	(United States) Matt Kuchar	2 up
13	(United States) Tiger Woods
50	(Denmark) Lucas Bjerregaard	1 up
57	(United States) Kevin Na
7	(Italy) Francesco Molinari	6&5
48	(United States) Kevin Kisner	2&1
19	(South Africa) Louis Oosthuizen

Semifinals — 18 holes March 31 – morning
23	(United States) Matt Kuchar	1 up
50	(Denmark) Lucas Bjerregaard
7	(Italy) Francesco Molinari
48	(United States) Kevin Kisner	1 up

Final — 18 holes March 31 – afternoon
23	(United States) Matt Kuchar
48	(United States) Kevin Kisner	3&2
Third place
50	(Denmark) Lucas Bjerregaard
7	(Italy) Francesco Molinari	4&2

== Prize money breakdown ==
Place	Description	US ($)
1	Champion	1,745,000
2	Runner-up	1,095,000
3	Third place	712,000
4	Fourth place	574,000
T5	Losing quarter-finalists x 4	315,000
T9	Losing round of 16 x 8	167,000
T17	Those with 2 points in pool play x 7	108,429
T24	Those with 1.5 points in pool play x 16	81,313
T40	Those with 1 point in pool play x 16	62,500
T56	Those with 0.5 points in pool play x 5	53,000
T61	Those with 0 points in pool play x 4	50,750
	Total	10,250,000
