= Allison Stokke =

American pole vaulter (born 1989)

Allison Stokke Fowler
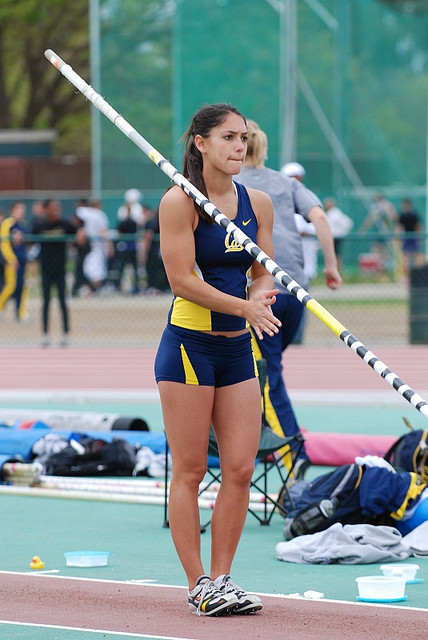
- Stokke competing in 2008

Personal information
- Full name: Allison Rebecca Stokke Fowler
- Born: Allison Stokke; March 22, 1989 (age 37) Newport Beach, California, U.S.
- Education: Newport Harbor High School; University of California, Berkeley
- Occupations: Pole Vaulter; Fitness model
- Height: 5 ft 7 in (170 cm)
- Weight: 128 lb (58 kg)
- Spouse: Rickie Fowler (m. 2019)
- Children: 2
- Other interests: Golf

Sport
- Sport: Track and field
- Event: Pole vault
- College team: California Golden Bears
- Updated on November 15, 2016

Allison Rebecca Stokke Fowler (born March 22, 1989) is a retired American track and field athlete who now makes a living as a fitness model. She broke a number of American records for high school pole vaulting. Images of her at age seventeen were widely shared on the Internet, resulting in her becoming an internet phenomenon.

Stokke continued to pole vault, attending University of California, Berkeley, and competing for their California Golden Bears collegiate track team. She competed at two NCAA Division I Championships, achieving All-American honors at the 2011 NCAA Indoor Championships, and earned regional level all-academic honors through her combined athletic and academic performances. She attempted to make the American Olympic team at the 2012 United States Olympic Trials but failed to record a height. She continued vaulting at national level meetings up to 2017.

After college, she became a professional vaulter and sports model for Nike and Athleta, among others.

== Early life ==
Born to Allan and Cindy Stokke in Newport Beach, California, Stokke grew up in a sporting family – her older brother David was a national level youth gymnast. After trying gymnastics, she took up pole vaulting while attending Newport Harbor High School and soon became one of the country's best young vaulters. She won the age 15/16 United States title in 2004 with a championship record of 3.81 m (12 ft 6 in).

She broke the American record for a high school freshman with a vault of 3.86 m (12 ft 7 3/4 in) in 2004 and then set a new high school sophomore record with 4.11 m (13 ft 5 3/4 in) in 2005. Her vaults were also the best ever achieved by an American aged fifteen and sixteen. Despite breaking her leg while in high school, she managed to win twice at the CIF California State Meet. In her senior year of high school, she ranked second in the national high school rankings with a new best of 4.14 m (13 ft 6 3/4 in). She finished eighth at the national junior championships that year.

== Internet fame ==
Images of Stokke competing in New York in early 2007 were taken by a journalist for a Californian track and field website and placed online. In May, the image was then re-posted by With Leather, a sports blog with a large male fanbase, remarking on the attractiveness of seventeen-year-old Stokke under the headline "Pole Vaulting is Sexy, Barely Legal". The photographer threatened to sue site owner Matt Ufford if he did not remove the image, but the article had already received significant attention and been posted at dozens of other websites. A tribute website to Stokke soon emerged with several images of her competing in the pole vault and, after these images spread via social media, Internet fan groups attracted thousands of followers. Within several weeks, her photos had become such an Internet phenomenon that they generated comment pieces nationally from The Washington Post, Los Angeles Times and The New York Times, and internationally from British broadcasters at the BBC, Australian daily The Sydney Morning Herald, and the German weekly Der Spiegel, in addition to more than one million search engine results. CBS also gave television coverage, using her story to highlight the dangers of the internet being used to publicly sexualize young people.

Stokke initially tried to control the situation herself, but after being bombarded with emails and requests for photo shoots, she sought a media consultant to handle her new-found fame. She gave an interview on pole vaulting technique which was uploaded to YouTube, and it received over 100,000 views, but comments and discussion on the internet largely remained in relation to her looks. Her father, a lawyer, began to review online material to identify illegal behavior or stalkers. Reflecting on her situation, Stokke told The Washington Post "even if none of it is illegal, it just all feels really demeaning. I worked so hard for pole vaulting and all this other stuff, and it's almost like that doesn't matter. Nobody sees that. Nobody really sees me." Der Spiegel noted that Stokke had become a "sex symbol against her will". The attention affected her psychologically: she said that she found the leering "creepy and a little scary" and now took care to lock doors behind her.

It was noted by the Los Angeles Times, among others, that Stokke did not seek or endorse such attention. In their book Technology, Power and Culture in the Network Society, Brett Hutchins and David Rowe linked Stokke's case with that of American soccer players Alex Morgan and Hope Solo, female athletes who were fetishized and saw their public image framed sexually, in a way that the authors said de-emphasized their sporting achievements. Regarding Stokke, they also observed that social media comments were frequently insulting in nature and that the commenters blamed the sexualization process on the women themselves. Others drew parallels with Brandi Chastain's celebration of winning the 1999 FIFA Women's World Cup Final in her sports bra, where women's sporting moments were overshadowed by discussions of their appearance.

== Later career ==
After Stokke rose to fame, many more photographers began to attend the track and field competitions in which she took part, and her internet fame persisted over the following years. She continued to study and earned an athletic scholarship, studying sociology at the University of California, Berkeley. In her first year of competition for the California Golden Bears collegiate track team she broke the school record for a freshman athlete both indoors and outdoors with a vault of 4.11 m (13 ft 5 3/4 in). She competed at the Pac-10 Conference and Mountain Pacific Sports Federation (MPSF) regional meets that season.

Stokke had more success in her second year at college, scaling 4.21 m (13 ft 9 1/2 in) in Sacramento, California, under the close observation of Cal coach and former five-time All-American at UCLA, Scott Slover. She finished eighth at the Pac-10 Championships, seventh at the MPSF Indoor Championships, debuted at the NCAA Women's Division I Outdoor Track and Field Championships, ranking 19th with her best effort of 3.90 m (12 ft 9 1/2 in). She focused on her studies in her third year at Berkeley and received conference all-academic honors at Pac-10 and MPSF level, as well as getting an academic honorable mention by the U.S. Track & Field and Cross Country Coaches Association. In her last year of collegiate vaulting, she did not improve her best, finishing eighth at the Pac-10 Championships and missing qualification for the NCAA Championships by two places at the regionals. However, in 2011 Stokke did place eighth at the NCAA Indoor Championships held at Texas A&M, clearing 4.10 m (13-05.25) on her first attempt, which secured All-American status.

After finishing her degree, she continued to pole vault, although she did not rank highly among American athletes. A new lifetime best of 4.36 m (14 ft 3 1/2 in) came in the 2012 season as she aimed for the 2012 London Olympics. However, she did not perform well at the 2012 United States Olympic Trials, as one of 12 competitors who failed to clear the opening height of 4.25 m (13 ft 11 1/4 in). Her performances declined thereafter, with a best of 4.20 m in 2013 and 3.95 m in 2014. Her 2015 best of 4.15 m (13 ft 7 1/4 in) (achieved in a third-place finish at the National Pole Vault Summit) was an improvement but still ranked her outside of the top 30 American women that year.

She became a sportswear model, appearing in campaigns for Nike, Inc. and Athleta in 2015, and Uniqlo in 2016. She also began to work with GoPro, delivering a series of videos of her vaulting heights with the camera attached to her pole to demonstrate the inner working of the sport and advertise the action camera equipment. By 2016, these videos have received in excess of six million views on YouTube.

Despite not placing highly on the national rankings, Stokke continued to compete regularly in national-level meetings. Her 2016 best was eighth at the Chula Vista OTC High Performance Meet with a height of 4.15 m and she improved the following year to 4.27 m for third at the 2017 Austin Longhorn Invitational.

== Personal life ==
In 2017, Stokke started dating American professional golfer Rickie Fowler, a committed and outspoken Christian. The couple became engaged in June 2018, and were married on October 15, 2019. Following the wedding, Fowler had an "XV" inked at the top of his left ring finger, commemorating the date he married Stokke and complementing the small Christian cross on the inside of his right index finger, which attests to their religious faith. The couple has two daughters.

== Seasonal bests ==
Year	Height	U.S. ranking
2017	4.27 m (14 ft 1/8 in)	
2016	4.16 m (13 ft 7 3/4 in)	
2015	4.15 m (13 ft 7 3/8 in)	
2014	3.95 m (12 ft 11 1/2 in)	
2013	4.20 m (13 ft 9 3/8 in)	
2012	4.36 m (14 ft 3 5/8 in)	21
2011	4.26 m (13 ft 11 3/4 in)	27
2010	4.10 m (13 ft 5 3/8 in)	
2009	4.21 m (13 ft 9 3/4 in)	24
2008	4.11 m (13 ft 5 3/4 in)	
2007	4.14 m (13 ft 7 in)	33
2006	3.88 m (12 ft 8 3/4 in)	
2005	4.11 m (13 ft 5 3/4 in)	35
2004	3.86 m (12 ft 8 in)	
