= Mylan Classic =

Tournament information
- Location: Canonsburg, Pennsylvania
- Established: 2010
- Course: Southpointe Golf Club
- Par: 71
- Length: 6,951 yards (6,356 m)
- Tour: Web.com Tour
- Format: Stroke play
- Prize fund: US$675,000
- Month played: August
- Final year: 2013

Tournament record score
- Aggregate: 261 Kevin Kisner (2010)
- To par: −27 as above

Final champion
- (United States) Ben Martin
- Location in the United States Location in Pennsylvania

The Mylan Classic was a golf tournament on the Web.com Tour. It was played for the first time in September 2010 at Southpointe Golf Club in Canonsburg, Pennsylvania, a suburb of Pittsburgh. The title sponsor was Mylan, a pharmaceuticals company based in Canonsburg. Beginning in 2013, the tournament will invite top collegiate players to the event as the Nationwide Children's Hospital Invitational had done from 2007 to 2012.

The 2013 purse was US$675,000, with $121,500 going to the winner.

== Winners ==
Year	Winner	Score	To par	Margin of victory	Runner(s)-up
2013	(United States) Ben Martin	267	−17	5 strokes	(United States) Kelly Kraft
2012	(United States) Robert Streb	266	−18	4 strokes	(Canada) Brad Fritsch (United States) Cliff Kresge (United States) Matt Weibring
2011	(England) Gary Christian	267	−17	1 stroke	(United States) John Mallinger
2010	(United States) Kevin Kisner	271	−13	3 strokes	(United States) Geoffrey Sisk
