= Kevin Kisner =

American professional golfer (born 1984)

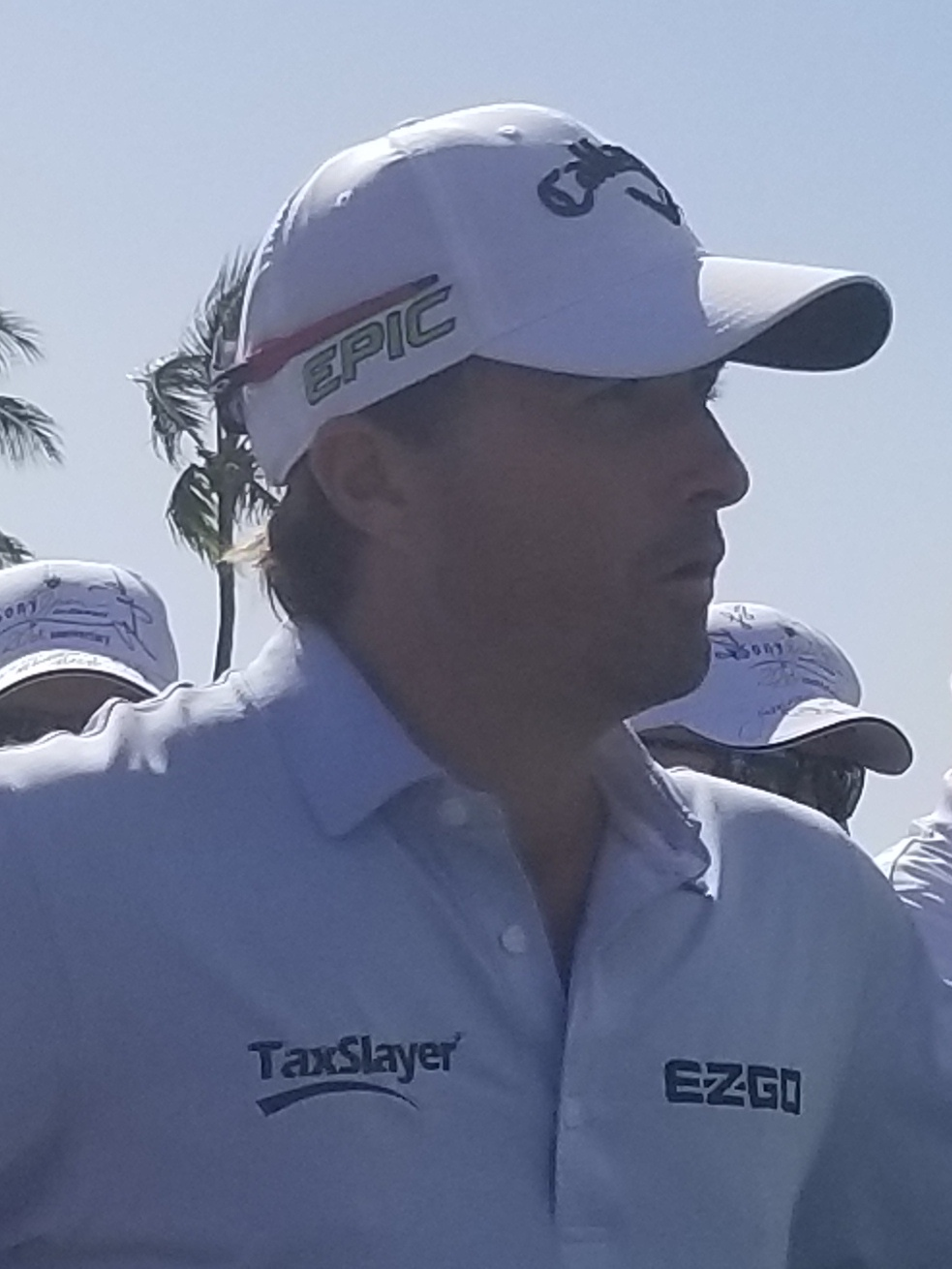
- Kisner in 2018

Personal information
- Full name: Kevin James Kisner
- Nationality: United States
- Born: February 15, 1984 (age 42) Aiken, South Carolina, U.S.
- Height: 5 ft 10 in (1.78 m)
- Weight: 165 lb (75 kg; 11.8 st)
- Spouse: Brittany DeJarnett (m. 2012)
- Children: 3

Career
- Sport: Golf
- College: University of Georgia
- Turned professional: 2006
- Current tour: PGA Tour
- Former tours: European Tour; Web.com Tour; Tarheel Tour
- Professional wins: 10
- Highest ranking: 14 (January 17, 2016)

Number of wins by tour
- PGA Tour: 4
- European Tour: 1
- Korn Ferry Tour: 2
- Other: 4

Best results in major championships
- Masters Tournament: T21: 2019
- PGA Championship: T7: 2017
- U.S. Open: T12: 2015
- The Open Championship: T2: 2018

Kevin James Kisner (born February 15, 1984) is an American professional golfer who plays on the PGA Tour.

== Early life ==
Kisner was born in Aiken, South Carolina and attended South Aiken High School. He played college golf at the University of Georgia and was a member of their 2005 NCAA Division I Championship team along with Chris Kirk, Richard Scott, and Brendon Todd. After graduating in 2006, he turned professional.

== Professional career ==
Kisner played on the mini-tours (NGA Hooters Tour and Tarheel Tour) from 2007 to 2009, winning three times. He also played in six Nationwide Tour events in 2009. He played the Nationwide Tour full-time in 2010, winning once at the Mylan Classic. He finished the year 11th on the money list and earned his 2011 PGA Tour card.

Kisner failed to earn enough money on the PGA Tour in 2011 to retain his card (181st on money list), but finished T-11 at qualifying school to earn his card for 2012. He again failed to retain his card, finishing 167th on the money list, and missed earning a card in qualifying school by one stroke. He returned to (the now renamed) Web.com Tour in 2013 and won the Chile Classic in March. He finished 13th on the 2013 Web.com Tour regular season money list to earn his 2014 PGA Tour card.

In 2014, Kisner finished sixth at the Wells Fargo Championship, eighth at the Wyndham Championship and ninth at the RBC Canadian Open.

During the 2015 PGA Tour, Kisner finished runner-up three times, losing all three in sudden-death playoffs. He was defeated at the 2015 RBC Heritage after losing on the second hole of the playoff to Jim Furyk. Kisner would go on to finish tied with Sergio García and Rickie Fowler at The Players Championship event in May after 72 holes, losing to Fowler on the first hole of sudden-death after the two remained tied following a three-hole aggregate playoff. At the Greenbrier Classic he again tied for second after losing a sudden-death playoff, which was eventually won by Danny Lee. Kisner was eliminated on the first extra hole with birdie. Other notable results were finishes for fourth at the McGladrey Classic, fifth at the Crowne Plaza Invitational at Colonial, and eighth at the Memorial Tournament.

Kisner finished as runner-up at the WGC-HSBC Champions event in Shanghai in November 2015, two strokes behind Russell Knox despite holding the 36-hole lead. This was Kisner's fourth runner-up finish of the 2015 calendar year.

On November 22, 2015, after a number of near misses, Kisner earned his first PGA Tour victory by winning the RSM Classic, in his 109th PGA Tour start. He won by six strokes over Kevin Chappell as he dominated the tournament over the weekend. He began the final round with a three stroke advantage and shot a final round of 64 to storm to his first victory. The win moved him into the Top 20 in the world rankings and put him at the top of the early FedEx Cup standings moving into 2016.

On May 28, 2017, Kisner won his second PGA Tour title at the Dean & DeLuca Invitational with a one-stroke victory over three other players.

On March 25, 2018, Kisner finished runner-up in the WGC-Dell Technologies Match Play in Austin, Texas. He lost to Bubba Watson in the final, 7 & 6. He also tied for second with a score of six-under-par at the 2018 Open Championship.

On March 31, 2019, Kisner once again reached the championship round of the WGC-Dell Technologies Match Play. This time, he won the tournament (3 & 2) over fellow American Matt Kuchar.

In August 2021, Kisner won the Wyndham Championship with a birdie on the second extra hole in a six-man sudden-death playoff.

In September 2022, Kisner was selected for the U.S. team in the 2022 Presidents Cup; he tied one and lost two of the three matches he played.

== Charity ==
Kisner founded the Kisner Foundation with his wife, Brittany, to "support organizations that serve children in one or more of the following areas: child health, education, youth sports" in and around his hometown of Aiken, South Carolina.

== Professional wins (10) ==
=== PGA Tour wins (4) ===
Legend
World Golf Championships (1)
Other PGA Tour (3)

No.	Date	Tournament	Winning score	Margin of victory	Runner(s)-up
1	Nov 22, 2015	RSM Classic	−22 (65-67-64-64=260)	6 strokes	(United States) Kevin Chappell
2	May 28, 2017	Dean & DeLuca Invitational	−10 (67-67-70-66=270)	1 stroke	(United States) Sean O'Hair, (Spain) Jon Rahm, (United States) Jordan Spieth
3	Mar 31, 2019	WGC-Dell Technologies Match Play	3 and 2		(United States) Matt Kuchar
4	Aug 15, 2021	Wyndham Championship	−15 (65-68-66-66=265)	Playoff	(South Africa) Branden Grace, (South Korea) Kim Si-woo, (United States) Kevin Na, (Australia) Adam Scott, (Canada) Roger Sloan

PGA Tour playoff record (1–5)

No.	Year	Tournament	Opponent(s)	Result
1	2015	RBC Heritage	(United States) Jim Furyk	Lost to birdie on second extra hole
2	2015	The Players Championship	(United States) Rickie Fowler, (Spain) Sergio García	Fowler won with birdie on first extra hole after three-hole aggregate playoff; Fowler: −1 (5-2-4=11), Kisner: −1 (5-2-4=11), García: +1 (5-3-5=13)
3	2015	Greenbrier Classic	(Canada) David Hearn, (New Zealand) Danny Lee, (United States) Robert Streb	Lee won with par on second extra hole Kisner and Streb eliminated by birdie on first hole
4	2017	Zurich Classic of New Orleans (with (United States) Scott Brown)	(Sweden) Jonas Blixt and (Australia) Cameron Smith	Lost to birdie on fourth extra hole
5	2020	RSM Classic	(United States) Robert Streb	Lost to birdie on second extra hole
6	2021	Wyndham Championship	(South Africa) Branden Grace, (South Korea) Kim Si-woo, (United States) Kevin Na, (Australia) Adam Scott, (Canada) Roger Sloan	Won with birdie on second extra hole

=== European Tour wins (1) ===
Legend
World Golf Championships (1)
Other European Tour (0)

No.	Date	Tournament	Winning score	Margin of victory	Runner-up
1	Mar 31, 2019	WGC-Dell Technologies Match Play	3 and 2		(United States) Matt Kuchar

=== Web.com Tour wins (2) ===
No.	Date	Tournament	Winning score	Margin of victory	Runner(s)-up
1	Sep 5, 2010	Mylan Classic	−13 (68-68-68-67=271)	1 stroke	(United States) Geoffrey Sisk
2	Mar 10, 2013	Chile Classic	−21 (71-67-61-68=267)	1 stroke	(United States) Brice Garnett, (United States) Edward Loar

=== NGA Hooters Tour wins (1) ===
No.	Date	Tournament	Winning score	Margin of victory	Runner-up
1	Apr 27, 2008	Savannah Lakes Resort Classic	−18 (68-65-70-67=270)	1 stroke	(United States) David Miller

=== Tarheel Tour wins (2) ===
No.	Date	Tournament	Winning score	Margin of victory	Runner-up
1	Mar 10, 2007	Match Play Championship	1 up		(United States) Reid Edstrom
2	May 30, 2008	Bermuda Run Open	−11 (65-68-70=203)	Playoff	(United States) Jason Kokrak

=== Other wins (1) ===
No.	Date	Tournament	Winning score	Margin of victory	Runner-up
1	Nov 23, 2013	Callaway Pebble Beach Invitational	−13 (70-67-64-74=275)	1 stroke	(United States) Chesson Hadley

== Results in major championships ==
Results not in chronological order in 2020.

Tournament	2014	2015	2016	2017	2018
Masters Tournament			T37	T43	T28
U.S. Open	CUT	T12	T49	T58	CUT
The Open Championship		CUT	76	T54	T2
PGA Championship		CUT	T18	T7	T12

Tournament	2019	2020	2021	2022	2023
Masters Tournament	T21	CUT	CUT	T44	CUT
PGA Championship	CUT	T19	CUT	CUT	CUT
U.S. Open	T49	CUT	T55	CUT	
The Open Championship	T30	NT	73	T21	

Top 10
Did not play

CUT = missed the half-way cut
"T" indicates a tie for a place
NT = No tournament due to COVID-19 pandemic

=== Summary ===
Tournament	Wins	2nd	3rd	Top-5	Top-10	Top-25	Events	Cuts made
Masters Tournament	0	0	0	0	0	1	8	5
PGA Championship	0	0	0	0	1	4	9	4
U.S. Open	0	0	0	0	0	1	9	5
The Open Championship	0	1	0	1	1	2	7	6
Totals	0	1	0	1	2	8	33	20

- Most consecutive cuts made – 9 (2016 Masters – 2018 Masters)
- Longest streak of top-10s – 1 (twice)

== Results in The Players Championship ==
Tournament	2015	2016	2017	2018	2019	2020	2021	2022	2023
The Players Championship	T2	CUT	T56	CUT	T22	C	CUT	4	75

Top 10

CUT = missed the halfway cut
"T" indicates a tie for a place
C = Canceled after the first round due to the COVID-19 pandemic

== World Golf Championships ==
=== Wins (1) ===
Year	Championship	54 holes	Winning score	Margin	Runner-up
2019	WGC-Dell Technologies Match Play	n/a	3 and 2		(United States) Matt Kuchar

=== Results timeline ===
Tournament	2015	2016	2017	2018	2019	2020	2021	2022	2023
Championship		T23	11	29	T27	T18	T41		
Match Play		T38	T17	2	1	NT^{1}	T18	2	T31
Invitational	T37	T16	T28	T39	T27	T25	63		
Champions	2	T70			T28	NT^{1}	NT^{1}	NT^{1}	

^{1}Cancelled due to COVID-19 pandemic

Win
Top 10
Did not play

QF, R16, R32, R64 = Round in which player lost in match play
NT = No tournament
"T" = Tied
Note that the Championship and Invitational were discontinued from 2022. The Champions was discontinued from 2023.

== U.S. national team appearances ==
Professional

- Presidents Cup: 2017 (winners), 2022 (winners)

== See also ==
- 2010 Nationwide Tour graduates
- 2011 PGA Tour Qualifying School graduates
- 2013 Web.com Tour Finals graduates
