= RSM Classic =

PGA Tour golf tournament in St. Simons Island, Georgia

Coordinates: 31.138°N 81.406°W

Tournament information
- Location: Saint Simons Island, Georgia
- Established: 2010
- Courses: Sea Island Golf Club (Seaside Course) (Plantation Course)
- Par: 70 (S); 72 (P)
- Length: 7,005 yards (6,405 m) (S); 7,160 yards (6,550 m) (P)
- Organized by: Davis Love Foundation
- Tour: PGA Tour
- Format: Stroke play
- Prize fund: US$7,600,000
- Month played: November
- Website: rsmclassic.com

Tournament record score
- Aggregate: 253 (Note: PGA Tour aggregate scoring record.) Ludvig Åberg (2023)
- To par: −29 as above

Current champion
- (Finland) Sami Välimäki

Location map
- Location in the United States Location in Georgia

The RSM Classic is a golf tournament on the PGA Tour, played in the autumn in Georgia. It debuted in October 2010 on St. Simons Island, Georgia at the Sea Island Golf Club. The tournament was known as the McGladrey Classic until 2015, when the title sponsor's name changed from McGladrey to RSM US.

Resident tour pros Davis Love III and Zach Johnson kicked off the event in March 2010, where they helped to unveil the tournament's new logo, which was painted by Rock Demarco. The inaugural event in 2010 was won by Heath Slocum, one stroke ahead of runner-up Bill Haas.

Since 2015, the event has been played over both the Seaside and Plantation courses at Sea Island, with the field expanded to 156 players. Between 2015 and 2019 and in 2021, it was the final official PGA Tour event of the calendar year, with only a few unofficial tournaments being held until the season resumed in January. After the PGA Tour reverted to a calendar year schedule for 2023, the RSM Classic became a final chance for players to earn or retain PGA Tour privileges.

== Winners ==
| Year | Winner | Score | To par | Margin of victory | Runner(s)-up | Purse ($) | Winner's share ($) |
RSM Classic
| 2026 | | | | | | 7,600,000 | 1,368,000 |
| 2025 | (Finland) Sami Välimäki | 259 | −23 | 1 stroke | (United States) Max McGreevy | 7,600,000 | 1,368,000 |
| 2024 | (United States) Maverick McNealy | 266 | −16 | 1 stroke | (United States) Daniel Berger (United States) Luke Clanton (a) (Colombia) Nico Echavarría | 7,600,000 | 1,368,000 |
| 2023 | (Sweden) Ludvig Åberg | 253 | −29 | 4 strokes | (Canada) Mackenzie Hughes | 8,400,000 | 1,512,000 |
| 2022 | (Canada) Adam Svensson | 263 | −19 | 2 strokes | (United States) Brian Harman (England) Callum Tarren (United States) Sahith Theegala | 8,100,000 | 1,458,000 |
| 2021 | (United States) Talor Gooch | 260 | −22 | 3 strokes | (Canada) Mackenzie Hughes | 7,200,000 | 1,296,000 |
| 2020 | (United States) Robert Streb (2) | 263 | −19 | Playoff | (United States) Kevin Kisner | 6,600,000 | 1,188,000 |
| 2019 | (United States) Tyler Duncan | 263 | −19 | Playoff | (United States) Webb Simpson | 6,600,000 | 1,188,000 |
| 2018 | (United States) Charles Howell III | 263 | −19 | Playoff | (United States) Patrick Rodgers | 6,400,000 | 1,152,000 |
| 2017 | (United States) Austin Cook | 261 | −21 | 4 strokes | (United States) J. J. Spaun | 6,200,000 | 1,116,000 |
| 2016 | (Canada) Mackenzie Hughes | 265 | −17 | Playoff | (United States) Blayne Barber (United States) Billy Horschel (Sweden) Henrik Norlander (Colombia) Camilo Villegas | 6,000,000 | 1,080,000 |
| 2015 | (United States) Kevin Kisner | 260 | −22 | 6 strokes | (United States) Kevin Chappell | 5,700,000 | 1,026,000 |
McGladrey Classic
| 2014 | (United States) Robert Streb | 266 | −14 | Playoff | (Zimbabwe) Brendon de Jonge (United States) Will MacKenzie | 5,600,000 | 1,008,000 |
| 2013 | (United States) Chris Kirk | 266 | −14 | 1 stroke | (United States) Briny Baird (South Africa) Tim Clark | 5,500,000 | 990,000 |
| 2012 | (United States) Tommy Gainey | 264 | −16 | 1 stroke | (United States) David Toms | 4,000,000 | 720,000 |
| 2011 | (United States) Ben Crane | 265 | −15 | Playoff | (United States) Webb Simpson | 4,000,000 | 720,000 |
| 2010 | (United States) Heath Slocum | 266 | −14 | 1 stroke | (United States) Bill Haas | 4,000,000 | 720,000 |
