= Brendon de Jonge =

Zimbabwean professional golfer (born 1980)

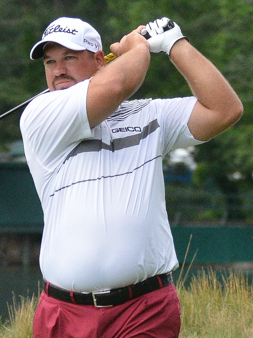
- De Jonge at the Greenbrier Classic in 2013

Personal information
- Full name: Brendon Russell de Jonge
- Nationality: Zimbabwe
- Born: 18 July 1980 (age 46) Salisbury (now Harare), Zimbabwe
- Height: 6 ft 0 in (1.83 m)
- Weight: 230 lb (100 kg; 16 st)

Career
- Sport: Golf
- College: Virginia Tech
- Turned professional: 2003
- Former tours: PGA Tour; Web.com Tour
- Professional wins: 1
- Highest ranking: 58 (8 December 2013)

Number of wins by tour
- Korn Ferry Tour: 1

Best results in major championships
- Masters Tournament: T37: 2014
- PGA Championship: T26: 2011
- U.S. Open: T28: 2014
- The Open Championship: CUT: 2014

Achievements and awards
- Nationwide Tour Player of the Year: 2008

Brendon Russell de Jonge (born 18 July 1980) is a Zimbabwean professional golfer. He currently plays on the PGA Tour. He played collegiate golf at Virginia Tech.

== Amateur career ==
In 1980, de Jonge was born in Salisbury, Zimbabwe.

De Jonge attended college in the United States at Virginia Tech. He was a two-time All-America selection by the Golf Coaches of America Association (2002, 2003). He was also Virginia collegiate player of the year for those two seasons. He was elected to the Virginia Tech Sports Hall of Fame in 2014.

== Professional career ==
De Jonge played on the Nationwide Tour from 2004 to 2006 and 2008. He earned his 2007 PGA Tour card at Q-school. He finished 155th on the money list in 2007, losing his tour card. In 2008 he finished second on the Nationwide Tour money list and earned his 2009 PGA Tour card. He did this by winning the Xerox Classic and recording a runner up finish and three third place finishes. He won the 2008 Nationwide Tour Player of the Year.

De Jonge finished 139th on the money list in 2009, which initially gave him conditional status for 2010. He earned a full tour card through PGA Tour Qualifying School. In 2010 De Jonge had his most successful year to date, with 7 top ten finishes taking him to 34th on the money list.

== Awards and honors ==
- In 2002 and 2003, de Jonge was earned All-American honors from the Golf Coaches of America Association
- In 2014, de Jonge was elected to the Virginia Tech Sports Hall of Fame

== Amateur wins (2) ==
- 1998 David Leadbetter Junior Invitational
- 1999 Zimbabwe Amateur

== Professional wins (1) ==
=== Nationwide Tour wins (1) ===
No.	Date	Tournament	Winning score	Margin of victory	Runner-up
1	17 Aug 2008	Xerox Classic	−13 (67-64-67-69=267)	4 strokes	(Australia) Jarrod Lyle

== Playoff record ==
PGA Tour playoff record (0–1)

No.	Year	Tournament	Opponents	Result
1	2014	McGladrey Classic	(United States) Robert Streb, (United States) Will MacKenzie	Streb won with birdie on second extra hole MacKenzie eliminated by par on first hole

== Results in major championships ==
Tournament	2010	2011	2012	2013	2014	2015
Masters Tournament					T37	
U.S. Open	T33				T28	
The Open Championship					CUT	
PGA Championship	T48	T26	T54	T33	T40	T65

Did not play

CUT = missed the half-way cut
"T" = tied

=== Summary ===
Tournament	Wins	2nd	3rd	Top-5	Top-10	Top-25	Events	Cuts made
Masters Tournament	0	0	0	0	0	0	1	1
U.S. Open	0	0	0	0	0	0	2	2
The Open Championship	0	0	0	0	0	0	1	0
PGA Championship	0	0	0	0	0	0	6	6
Totals	0	0	0	0	0	0	10	9

== Results in The Players Championship ==
Tournament	2010	2011	2012	2013	2014	2015	2016
The Players Championship	CUT	CUT	T15	T15	70	T63	T57

CUT = missed the halfway cut
"T" indicates a tie for a place

== Results in World Golf Championships ==
Tournament	2014
Match Play	
Championship	T54
Invitational	T37
Champions	

Did not play

"T" = Tied

== Team appearances ==
Amateur

- Eisenhower Trophy (representing Zimbabwe): 2000

Professional

- World Cup (representing Zimbabwe): 2011, 2013
- Presidents Cup (representing the International team): 2013

== See also ==
- 2006 PGA Tour Qualifying School graduates
- 2008 Nationwide Tour graduates
- 2009 PGA Tour Qualifying School graduates
