= Rickie Fowler =

American professional golfer (born 1988)

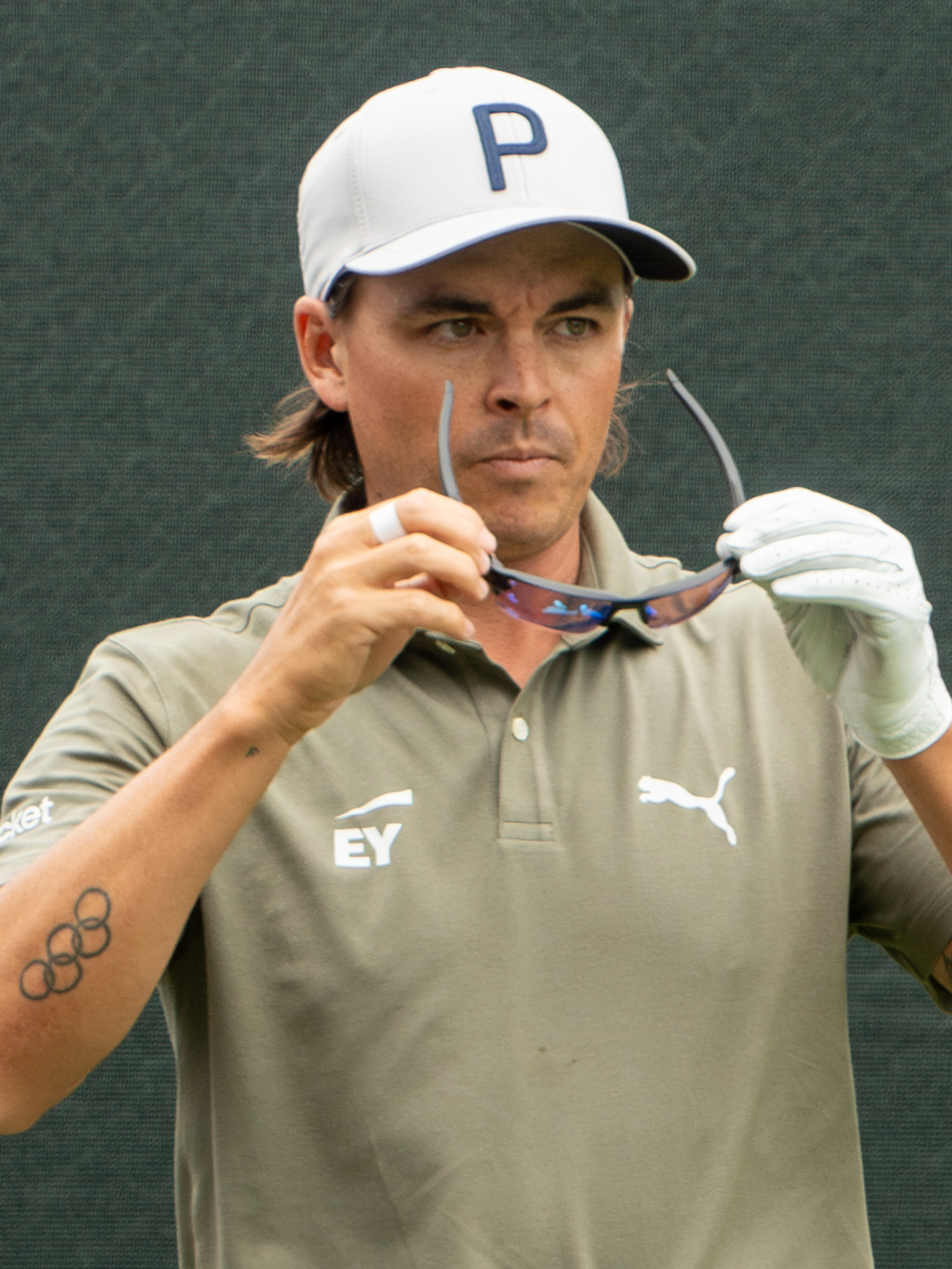
- Fowler at the 2025 Travelers Championship

Personal information
- Full name: Rick Yutaka Fowler
- Nationality: United States
- Born: December 13, 1988 (age 37) Murrieta, California, U.S.
- Height: 5 ft 9 in (1.75 m)
- Weight: 150 lb (68 kg; 11 st)
- Spouse: Allison Stokke (m. 2019)
- Children: 2

Career
- Sport: Golf
- College: Oklahoma State University
- Turned professional: 2009
- Current tour: PGA Tour
- Professional wins: 10
- Highest ranking: 4 (January 24, 2016)

Number of wins by tour
- PGA Tour: 6
- European Tour: 2
- Other: 2

Best results in major championships
- Masters Tournament: 2nd: 2018
- PGA Championship: T3: 2014
- U.S. Open: T2: 2014
- The Open Championship: T2: 2014

Achievements and awards
- Ben Hogan Award: 2008
- PGA Tour Rookie of the Year: 2010

Rick Yutaka Fowler (born December 13, 1988) is an American professional golfer who plays on the PGA Tour. He was the number one ranked amateur golfer in the world for 36 weeks in 2007 and 2008. On January 24, 2016, he reached a career high fourth in the Official World Golf Ranking following his victory in the Abu Dhabi HSBC Golf Championship. He is one of only seven golfers to shoot 62 in a major championship, achieving the feat at the 2023 U.S. Open, played at the Los Angeles Country Club.

== Amateur career ==
Fowler was born and raised in Murrieta, California. He attended Murrieta Valley High School. For years, he played only on a driving range and is almost entirely self-taught. In his senior year in high school, Fowler won the SW League Final with a total score of 64-69=133 and led his team to the state final in 2007.

After high school, Fowler attended Oklahoma State University in Stillwater. He posted his first collegiate victory at the Fighting Illini Invitational hosted by the University of Illinois on October 1, 2007, by shooting a 203 (70-63-70) to win the tournament by one stroke. In the summer of 2005, Fowler won the Western Junior and competed in the U.S. Amateur, where he was defeated by the eventual champion Richie Ramsay.

In 2006, Fowler shot a 137 for two rounds at the U.S. Junior Amateur and was knocked out in the second round of match play. The championship was won by Philip Francis. Fowler represented the United States in its victory at the 2007 Walker Cup. His record was 2–0 in foursomes and 1–1 in singles making his overall record 3–1. Billy Horschel was his partner for both of their foursome victories. That year Fowler won the Sunnehanna Amateur in June and the Players Amateur in July. In 2008, Fowler repeated as Sunnehanna Amateur champion. In the first round of the U.S. Open, Fowler shot a −1 (70) and was in a tie for 7th place. He was one of three amateurs to make the cut, along with Derek Fathauer and Michael Thompson. He ended the tournament tied for 60th.

In October 2008, Fowler played on the Eisenhower Trophy team that finished second. He was the leading individual player. In 2009, Fowler made his second and last appearance in the Walker Cup. He won all four matches in which he played as the U.S. won by a seven-point margin. His partner in both foursomes matches was Bud Cauley. He also finished third in the Sunnehanna Amateur in 2009. Fowler was given the 2008 Ben Hogan Award.

== Professional career ==
=== 2009 ===
In 2009, Fowler had the first runner-up finish of his career on the Nationwide Tour in the Nationwide Children's Hospital Invitational losing in a playoff to Derek Lamely. After the Walker Cup, Fowler turned professional and played the Albertsons Boise Open on the Nationwide Tour for his pro debut.

In September 2009, it was announced that Fowler signed a multi-year equipment deal with Titleist. He has since signed a deal with Rolex. Fowler's first PGA Tour event as a professional was the Justin Timberlake Shriners Hospitals for Children Open where he finished tied for seventh. His second PGA Tour event was at the Frys.com Open played at Grayhawk Golf Club in Scottsdale, Arizona. He finished tied for second after losing to Troy Matteson in a three-way playoff that included Jamie Lovemark. Fowler's score of 18-under-par included a hole-in-one on the fifth hole in his final round. Fowler also notched an eagle in each of his four rounds. In November, he finished T2 with D. A. Points, two shots behind the winner Mark Brooks in the Pebble Beach Invitational an unofficial money event on the PGA Tour. In December 2009, Fowler successfully gained his PGA Tour card for 2010 through qualifying school, finishing T15.

=== 2010 ===
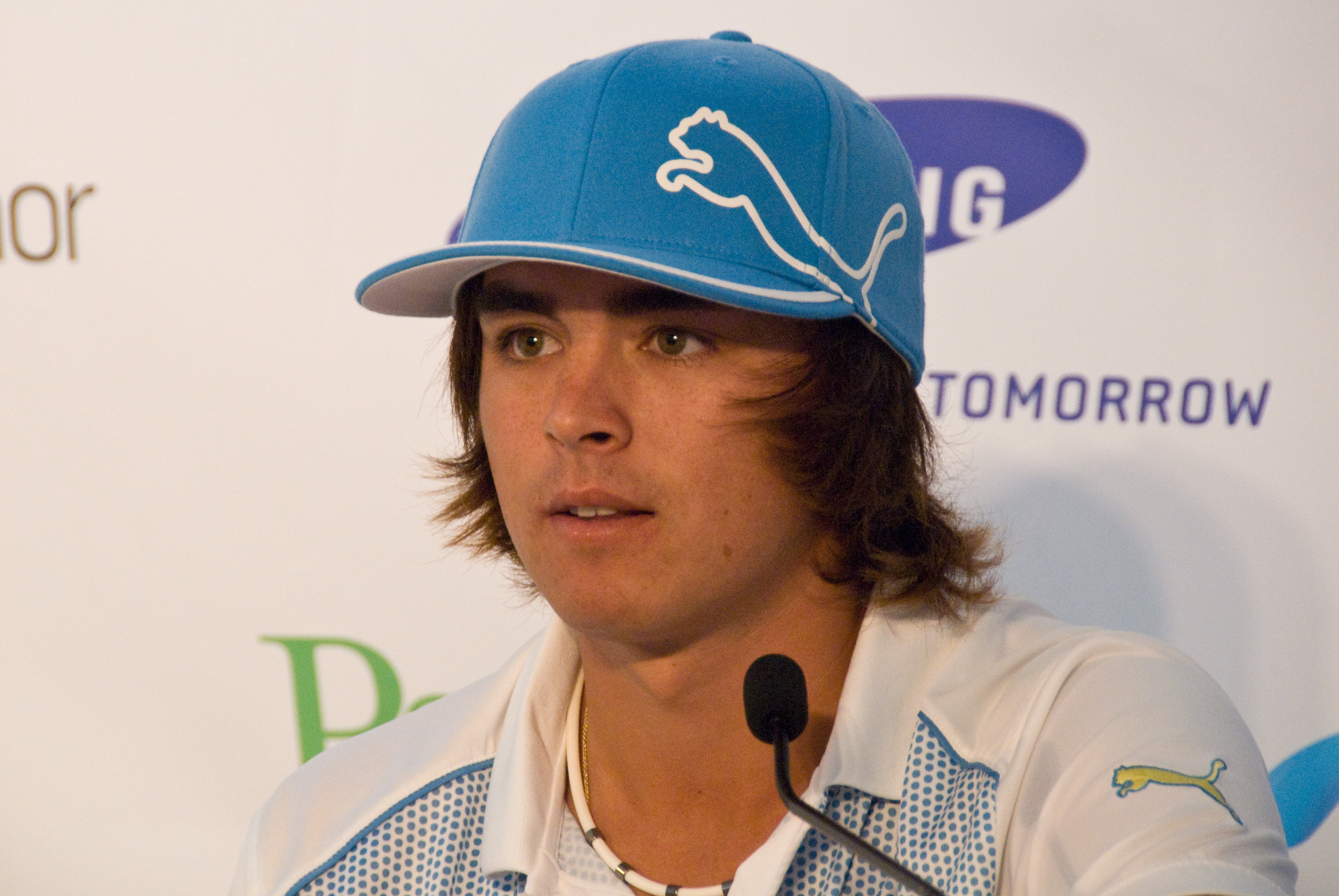
Rickie Fowler, 2010

In February 2010, Fowler finished second at the Waste Management Phoenix Open with a score of 15-under-par at the TPC of Scottsdale course. In June, Fowler notched his third PGA Tour runner-up finish at the Memorial Tournament in Dublin, Ohio. Fowler entered the final round in the lead, but shot a 73 to finish behind Justin Rose, who recorded his first PGA Tour victory. This performance took Fowler into the top 50 of the Official World Golf Ranking.

In September, he signed a clothing deal with Puma. In the same month, he was also chosen as a captain's pick for the U.S. Ryder Cup team. At age 21 years and 9 months when the matches began, Fowler became the youngest U.S. Ryder Cup player of all time, and only European Sergio García was younger when he made his Ryder Cup debut in 1999. Fowler forfeited a hole during foursomes competition on the first match day because of a rules violation, by taking a permissible free drop from muddy conditions in an improper location, a mistake U.S. captain Corey Pavin attributed to Fowler's inexperience. On the final day of the competition in his singles match against Edoardo Molinari, Fowler birdied the last 4 holes to halve the match after having been 4 down after 12 holes. Fowler won the Rookie of the Year award, controversially claiming the award over Northern Ireland's Rory McIlroy.

=== 2011 ===
In July 2011, Fowler tied the 54-hole lead at the AT&T National, but an early double bogey on Sunday derailed his opportunity for his first PGA Tour win. Two weeks later Fowler finished tied for 5th in The Open Championship at Royal St George's. In August, Fowler finished in a tie for second at the WGC-Bridgestone Invitational behind winner Adam Scott, lifting him to 28 in the world rankings.

At the PGA Championship, Fowler carded 74-69-75-68 to finish with a six-over par total of 286, in a tie for 51st place. Early on the third day Fowler rocketed up the leaderboard with three birdies in the first five holes only to falter later in the round with two triple bogeys, effectively ending his hopes of a first major championship and PGA Tour win.

At the first FedEx Cup playoff event, Fowler finished T52 at The Barclays in the last week in August. The following week he again finished T52 at the Deutsche Bank Championship, the second FedEx Cup playoff event, after carding a disappointing six-over par final round 77. At that point Fowler was positioned 37 in the FedEx Cup points standings and required a strong performance at the BMW Championship to qualify in the top thirty for The Tour Championship; a performance which eluded him, finishing in 48th place. In finishing 43rd in the FedEx Cup, Fowler earned a $132,000 bonus.

In October, Fowler enjoyed his first professional win with victory in the OneAsia Tour's Kolon Korea Open, securing a six-shot victory over Rory McIlroy.

Fowler ended 2011 ranked 32nd in the world.

In September, Fowler, along with Graeme McDowell, was part of the PGA Tour's These Guys are Good campaign.

=== 2012 ===
In May 2012, Fowler won the Wells Fargo Championship in Charlotte on the first extra hole of a sudden-death playoff. Replaying the 18th hole, he defeated Rory McIlroy and D. A. Points with a birdie to gain his first PGA Tour win. Fowler shot a 69 (−3) in the final round to finish in a three-way tie after 72 holes at Quail Hollow Club. This win enabled Fowler to break the top-25 in the world, placing him at number 24. The following week at The Players Championship in Ponte Vedra Beach, Florida, Fowler played the final hole at −11 under par and had a birdie opportunity to bring him within one of leader and eventual winner Matt Kuchar. Fowler, however, pushed his putt to the right and finished in a tie for second, the fifth second-place finish of his career.

=== 2013 ===
In 2013 Fowler finished runner-up in the Australian PGA Championship, four shots behind the tournament winner Adam Scott.

=== 2014 ===
After a tie for fifth at the Masters in April, Fowler had his best finish of 2014 at the U.S. Open at Pinehurst No. 2 in North Carolina. Fowler was runner-up with Erik Compton at −1, best finishes for both at a major, but they were eight strokes behind champion Martin Kaymer. Fowler had another second-place finish, at the Open Championship at Royal Liverpool Golf Club in Hoylake, England. He began the final round six strokes behind Rory McIlroy and finished the day tied for second with Sergio García at −15, two strokes behind McIlroy.

At the next major in August, the PGA Championship, Fowler, Phil Mickelson, Henrik Stenson, and McIlroy battled for the title on a rain-soaked Valhalla Golf Club, near Louisville. Despite holding the lead for a good portion of the day, Fowler tied for third. He was only the third player, along with Jack Nicklaus and Tiger Woods, to have finished in the top 5 in all four majors in one calendar year, but the first not to win (Jordan Spieth became the fourth player in 2015). Fowler had 10 top-10 finishes during the 2013–14 season. His 8th-place finish at The Tour Championship moved him to 10th in the world golf rankings.

=== 2015 ===
After a T-12 finish at the Masters, Fowler earned his first win in over three years with a playoff victory at The Players Championship in May. Trailing Sergio García midway through the final round by five shots, Fowler played the final six holes in 6-under par, including an eagle at the par-5 16th. After a birdie at the 17th hole, Fowler's final birdie of the round on 18 left him at 12-under par. Both García and Kevin Kisner had birdie attempts to win at the 18th in regulation, but both missed and the three men went to a three-hole aggregate playoff to decide a winner on holes 16–18. Fowler and Kisner went par-birdie-par to tie at −1 while García's three pars left him at even and he was eliminated. Thus Fowler and Kisner went to sudden death starting at the 17th, where Kisner's tee shot landed within about 12 feet (3.7 m) of the cup. Fowler's tee shot finished inside of five feet, and when Kisner's birdie attempt slid by, Fowler responded by making his short birdie to claim the championship. Fowler played his final 10 holes in 8-under par. On July 12, he won the Aberdeen Asset Management Scottish Open on the European Tour, shooting a 12-under-par 268. On September 7, he won the Deutsche Bank Championship, the second FedEx Cup Playoffs event, by one stroke over Henrik Stenson, for his third victory on the PGA Tour.

=== 2016 ===
After finishing fifth in the Hyundai Tournament of Champions in Hawaii, Fowler claimed his first victory of 2016 in the Abu Dhabi HSBC Golf Championship on the European Tour. He shot a final round of 69 to finish one clear of Belgium's Thomas Pieters. Two weeks later, Fowler was in contention to win again but lost out to Japan's Hideki Matsuyama in a playoff at the Waste Management Phoenix Open. On March 7, Fowler sparked fantastic scenes after sinking a hole-in-one with fellow tour pro Luke Donald's pitching wedge to win $1 million for Ernie Els' charity, Els for Autism.

In June, Fowler announced that he would not defend his Scottish Open title at Castle Stuart, citing the tight schedule due to golf's return to the Olympic Games as the main reason. At the 2016 Olympics, he came in 37th place.

At the first FedEx Cup playoff event of the season, The Barclays, Fowler went into the final round leading the event by one stroke. He endured a difficult final round, shooting a two-over-par 74. His challenge was ended with a double-bogey at the 16th hole that put him four strokes behind playing partner Patrick Reed. He went on to finish T7, three strokes behind the winner Reed. As a result of this, Fowler also failed to secure his automatic Ryder Cup spot, which he would have done with a top-three finish. Fowler moved up from 28th to 16th in the FedEx Cup standings with this result.

=== 2017 ===
On February 26, Fowler won The Honda Classic for his fourth PGA Tour win. For the first time in his career, Fowler preserved his 54-hole lead to win. The title saw Fowler move back up into the top 10 of the world rankings.

On June 16, Fowler carded a round of 65 at Erin Hills to take the first round lead at the 2017 U.S. Open. Fowler equaled the lowest first round score at the U.S. Open and led by one stroke from Paul Casey and Xander Schauffele. He followed this up with a one over par 73 in the second round to fall out of the lead by one stroke, held by four other players. He shot 68–72 over the weekend to finish in a tie for fifth place. Fowler started the PGA Championship with a 2-under 69 which was two strokes behind the leaders. After rounds of 70–73, he closed out the year's last major with a 4-under 67, including a run of four consecutive birdies on holes 12 through 15. Despite his solid finish, Fowler ended up tied for fifth and was 3 strokes behind the winner, and friend, Justin Thomas. It was his seventh top-5 major finish, meaning he has had multiple top-5 finishes at every major.

=== 2018 ===
On November 12, 2017, Fowler started his 2018 season at the OHL Classic at Mayakoba where he shot rounds of 65-67-67-67 for an 18-under-par total, one stroke shy of winner, Patton Kizzire. It was his 12th tour runner-up finish and he became just the 27th golfer in PGA Tour history to win $30,000,000 in Tour earnings.

On December 3, 2017, Fowler recorded a 61, 11-under-par, in the fourth round to win the Hero World Challenge. He came from 7 strokes behind the 54-hole leader, Charley Hoffman and claimed a four-stroke victory. The round of 61 was a course and tournament record, as well as being a personal best round for Fowler as a professional.

At the 2018 Waste Management Phoenix Open, Fowler birdied his final three holes during the third round to take the 54-hole lead by a stroke. This was his 6th 54-hole lead/co-lead of his career but had only converted once in the previous five attempts. In the final round, Fowler shot a 72 (+2) to finish T11.

At the 2018 Masters Tournament, Fowler shot a 72-hole score of −14 (274) to finish in 2nd place to champion Patrick Reed by 1 stroke. It was his eighth top-5 major finish, giving him multiple top-5 finishes at every major, however, he still has yet to win one.

In September 2018, Fowler qualified for the U.S. team participating in the 2018 Ryder Cup. Europe defeated the U.S. team 17 1/2 to 10 1/2. He went 1-3-0. He lost his singles match against Sergio García.

=== 2019 ===
In January, Fowler signed a multi-year deal to use TaylorMade golf balls and gloves. On February 3, Fowler won the Waste Management Phoenix Open after having a four-stroke lead in the final round, losing the lead, then regaining the lead for a two-stroke victory.

In December 2019, Fowler played on the U.S. team at the 2019 Presidents Cup at Royal Melbourne Golf Club in Australia. The U.S. team won 16–14. Fowler went 1–0–3 and halved his Sunday singles match against Marc Leishman.

=== 2020 ===
At the Sentry Tournament of Champions, Fowler finished T5th. The following week at The American Express, Fowler finished T10th. This would be Fowler's last top-10 finishes on the PGA Tour for a while as he started to struggle.

The 2019–20 PGA Tour season was suspended due to the COVID-19 pandemic. Once the season resumed, Fowler's struggles continued with up and down results. Fowler's best results after the restart included T12th at the Rocket Mortgage Classic and a T15th at the 2020 WGC-FedEx St. Jude Invitational. However, Fowler struggled at times to make the cut at many tournaments and missed 6 cuts out of 14 tournaments Fowler played in the period of January to August. Fowler missed the cut at the 2020 PGA Championship. For the FedEx Cup playoffs, Fowler finished T49th at The Northern Trust and failed to qualify for the BMW Championship. After a month of rest, Fowler returned to compete in the 2020 U.S. Open. Fowler finished T49th. At the 2020 Masters Tournament, Fowler would finish T29th.

=== 2021 ===
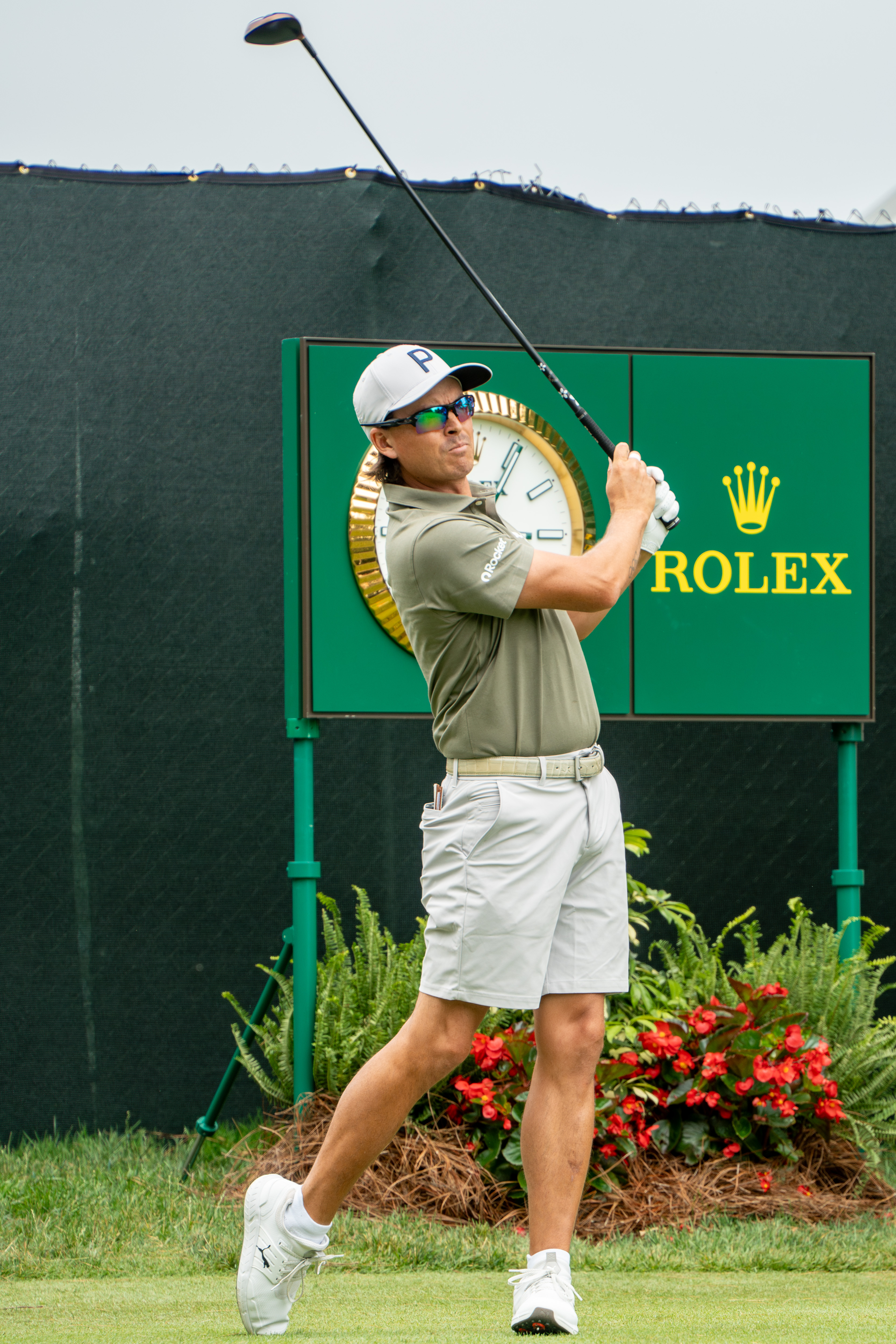
Rickie Fowler during the 2025 Travelers Championship

As Fowler continued to struggle with a missed cut at the 2021 Players Championship and a T65th at the Honda Classic, he was at risk of missing the 2021 Masters Tournament heading into the Valero Texas Open. Fowler finished T17th, and therefore missed the Masters. This was the first major Fowler missed since not qualifying for the 2010 U.S. Open.

Fowler missed cuts at the Wells Fargo Championship and the AT&T Byron Nelson. At the 2021 PGA Championship, he finished T8th, his first top-10 finish in an event since the 2020 Sentry Tournament of Champions.

=== 2022 ===
Fowler's struggles continued into 2022, missing his first three cuts until a T55th finish at the Genesis Invitational. He only played one major, the PGA Championship, where he tied for 23rd. Fowler barely retained his Tour card, finishing 125th in the FedEx Cup, claiming the last spot.

In the off-season, Fowler parted ways with long-time caddie Joe Skovron, who spent 13 years with Fowler, replacing him with Ricky Romano. Fowler also fired swing coach John Tillery, bringing back his old swing coach, Butch Harmon. These changes produced improved results, as Fowler finished tied for 6th in the season opening Fortinet Championship. After a missed cut at the Shriners Children's Open, Fowler tied for second at the Zozo Championship, one shot behind winner Keegan Bradley. This was Fowler's best finish on Tour since the 2019 Honda Classic, where he also tied for second.

=== 2023 ===
In July, Fowler won the Rocket Mortgage Classic in a playoff over Collin Morikawa and Adam Hadwin. It was his first win on the PGA Tour since the 2019 Waste Management Phoenix Open.

== Personal life ==
Fowler resides in Jupiter, Florida, relocating from Las Vegas following the 2010 season. Fowler's middle name, Yutaka, comes from his maternal grandfather, who is Japanese. His maternal grandmother is Navajo Native American. On the final day of a golf tournament Fowler wears orange in honor of Oklahoma State University.

Fowler is one of four golfers in the "Golf Boys" group along with fellow PGA Tour players Ben Crane, Bubba Watson and Hunter Mahan. The Golf Boys released a YouTube video of the song "Oh Oh Oh" on the eve of the 2011 U.S. Open. Farmers Insurance donated $1,000 for every 100,000 views of the video. The charitable proceeds went to support both Farmers and Ben Crane charitable initiatives.

In 2012, Fowler filmed a commercial for Crowne Plaza Hotels entitled "It's Good to be Rickie" with golf commentator Ian Baker Finch. He was featured in an ESPN "This is SportsCenter" commercial with sportscaster John Anderson in 2013. On November 28, 2015, Fowler was the guest picker on ESPN's College GameDay (his picks went 7–4). In 2015, Fowler was announced as an official ambassador for PGA Junior League Golf, a program owned and operated by the PGA of America.

Fowler started dating track and field amateur athlete Allison Stokke in 2017. They became engaged in June 2018, and married in October 2019. The couple has two daughters.

== Amateur wins ==
- 2005 Western Junior
- 2007 Sunnehanna Amateur, Players Amateur
- 2008 Sunnehanna Amateur, Big 12 Championship

== Professional wins (10) ==
=== PGA Tour wins (6) ===
Legend
Players Championships (1)
FedEx Cup playoff events (1)
Other PGA Tour (4)

No.	Date	Tournament	Winning score	To par	Margin of victory	Runner(s)-up
1	May 6, 2012	Wells Fargo Championship	66-72-67-69=274	−14	Playoff	(Northern Ireland) Rory McIlroy, (United States) D. A. Points
2	May 10, 2015	The Players Championship	69-69-71-67=276	−12	Playoff	(Spain) Sergio García, (United States) Kevin Kisner
3	Sep 7, 2015	Deutsche Bank Championship	67-67-67-68=269	−15	1 stroke	(Sweden) Henrik Stenson
4	Feb 26, 2017	The Honda Classic	66-66-65-71=268	−12	4 strokes	(United States) Morgan Hoffmann, (United States) Gary Woodland
5	Feb 3, 2019	Waste Management Phoenix Open	64-65-64-74=267	−17	2 strokes	(South Africa) Branden Grace
6	Jul 2, 2023	Rocket Mortgage Classic	67-65-64-68=264	−24	Playoff	(Canada) Adam Hadwin, (United States) Collin Morikawa

PGA Tour playoff record (3–2)

No.	Year	Tournament	Opponent(s)	Result
1	2009	Frys.com Open	(United States) Jamie Lovemark, (United States) Troy Matteson	Matteson won with birdie on second extra hole
2	2012	Wells Fargo Championship	(Northern Ireland) Rory McIlroy, (United States) D. A. Points	Won with birdie on first extra hole
3	2015	The Players Championship	(Spain) Sergio García, (United States) Kevin Kisner	Won with birdie on first extra hole after three-hole aggregate playoff; Fowler: −1 (5-2-4=11), Kisner: −1 (5-2-4=11), García: +1 (5-3-5=13)
4	2016	Waste Management Phoenix Open	(Japan) Hideki Matsuyama	Lost to par on fourth extra hole
5	2023	Rocket Mortgage Classic	(Canada) Adam Hadwin, (United States) Collin Morikawa	Won with birdie on first extra hole

=== European Tour wins (2) ===
No.	Date	Tournament	Winning score	To par	Margin of victory	Runner(s)-up
1	Jul 12, 2015	Aberdeen Asset Management Scottish Open	66-68-66-68=268	−12	1 stroke	(France) Raphaël Jacquelin, (United States) Matt Kuchar
2	Jan 24, 2016	Abu Dhabi HSBC Golf Championship	70-68-65-69=272	−16	1 stroke	(Belgium) Thomas Pieters

=== OneAsia Tour wins (1) ===
No.	Date	Tournament	Winning score	To par	Margin of victory	Runner-up
1	Oct 9, 2011	Kolon Korea Open^{1}	67-70-63-68=268	−16	6 strokes	(Northern Ireland) Rory McIlroy

^{1}Co-sanctioned by the Korean Tour

=== Other wins (1) ===
No.	Date	Tournament	Winning score	To par	Margin of victory	Runner-up
1	Dec 3, 2017	Hero World Challenge	67-70-72-61=270	−18	4 strokes	(United States) Charley Hoffman

== Playoff record ==
Nationwide Tour playoff record (0–1)

No.	Year	Tournament	Opponent	Result
1	2009	Nationwide Children's Hospital Invitational (as an amateur)	(United States) Derek Lamely	Lost to par on second extra hole

== Results in major championships ==
Results not in chronological order in 2020.

Tournament	2008	2009	2010	2011	2012	2013	2014	2015	2016	2017	2018
Masters Tournament				T38	T27	T38	T5	T12	CUT	T11	2
U.S. Open	T60	CUT		CUT	T41	T10	T2	CUT	CUT	T5	T20
The Open Championship			T14	T5	T31	CUT	T2	T30	T46	T22	T28
PGA Championship			T58	T51	CUT	T19	T3	T30	T33	T5	T12

Tournament	2019	2020	2021	2022	2023	2024	2025	2026
Masters Tournament	T9	T29				T30		
PGA Championship	T36	CUT	T8	T23	CUT	T63	CUT	T60
U.S. Open	T43	T49			T5	CUT		CUT
The Open Championship	T6	NT	T53		T23	71	T14	T18

Top 10
Did not play

CUT = missed the half-way cut
"T" = tied
NT = no tournament due to COVID-19 pandemic

=== Summary ===
Tournament	Wins	2nd	3rd	Top-5	Top-10	Top-25	Events	Cuts made
Masters Tournament	0	1	0	2	3	5	11	10
PGA Championship	0	0	1	2	3	6	17	13
U.S. Open	0	1	0	3	4	5	15	9
The Open Championship	0	1	0	2	3	8	15	14
Totals	0	3	1	9	13	24	58	46

- Most consecutive cuts made – 14 (2016 Open – 2019 Open)
- Longest streak of top-10s – 4 (2014 Masters – 2014 PGA)

== The Players Championship ==
=== Wins (1) ===
Year	Championship	54 holes	Winning score	Margin	Runners-up
2015	The Players Championship	3 shot deficit	−12 (69-69-71-67=276)	Playoff	(Spain) Sergio García, (United States) Kevin Kisner

=== Results timeline ===
Tournament	2010	2011	2012	2013	2014	2015	2016	2017	2018	2019
The Players Championship	CUT	CUT	T2	CUT	T77	1	CUT	T60	CUT	T47

Tournament	2020	2021	2022	2023	2024	2025	2026
The Players Championship	C	CUT		T13	T68	71	T42

Win
Top 10

CUT = missed the halfway cut
"T" indicates a tie for a place
C = canceled after the first round due to the COVID-19 pandemic

== Results in World Golf Championships ==
Results not in chronological order prior to 2015.

Tournament	2010	2011	2012	2013	2014	2015	2016	2017	2018	2019	2020	2021	2022	2023
Championship		8	T45	T35	T44	T12	T8	T16	T37	T36				
Match Play		R16	R64	R64	3	R16	T38				NT^{1}			T17
Invitational	T33	T2	T60	T21	T8	T10	T10	9	T17		T15			
Champions	T25			T55	T3	T17	T6				NT^{1}	NT^{1}	NT^{1}	

^{1}Cancelled due to COVID-19 pandemic

Top 10
Did not play

QF, R16, R32, R64 = Round in which player lost in match play
NT = No tournament
"T" = tied
Note that the Championship and Invitational were discontinued from 2022. The Champions was discontinued from 2023.

== PGA Tour career summary ==
Season	Starts	Cuts made	Wins	2nd	3rd	Top-10	Best finish	Earnings ($)	Money list rank	Scoring avg (adj)	Scoring rank
2008	2	1	0	0	0	0	T60	0	–	71.42	
2009	6	4	0	1	0	2	T2	571,090	–	70.11	
2010	28	20	0	2	1	7	2	2,857,109	23	70.43	41
2011	24	19	0	1	0	4	T2	2,084,681	37	70.01	20
2012	23	20	1	1	0	5	1	3,066,293	21	70.61	62
2013	22	18	0	0	1	5	T3	1,816,742	40	70.21	28
2014	26	19	0	2	2	10	T2	4,806,117	8	70.17	30
2015	21	17	2	1	1	7	1	5,773,430	4	70.23	21
2016	23	18	0	1	0	8	2	2,713,563	32	70.12	14
2017	21	18	1	2	2	10	1	6,083,197	6	69.08	2
2018	20	17	0	2	0	6	2	4,235,237	16	69.44	8
2019	20	18	1	1	0	6	1	3,945,810	15	69.95	15
2020	14	8	0	0	0	2	T5	947,309	97	70.50	53
2021	24	15	0	0	0	1	T8	1,089,904	119	71.29	T113
Career*	274	212	5	14	7	72	1	40,699,234	23		

*As of the 2021 season.

== U.S. national team appearances ==
Amateur

- Walker Cup: 2007 (winners), 2009 (winners)
- Palmer Cup: 2008
- Eisenhower Trophy: 2008 (individual leader)

Professional

- Ryder Cup: 2010, 2014, 2016 (winners), 2018, 2023
- Presidents Cup: 2015 (winners), 2017 (winners), 2019 (winners)
- World Cup: 2016

== See also ==
- 2009 PGA Tour Qualifying School graduates
