= Robert Streb =

American professional golfer (born 1987)

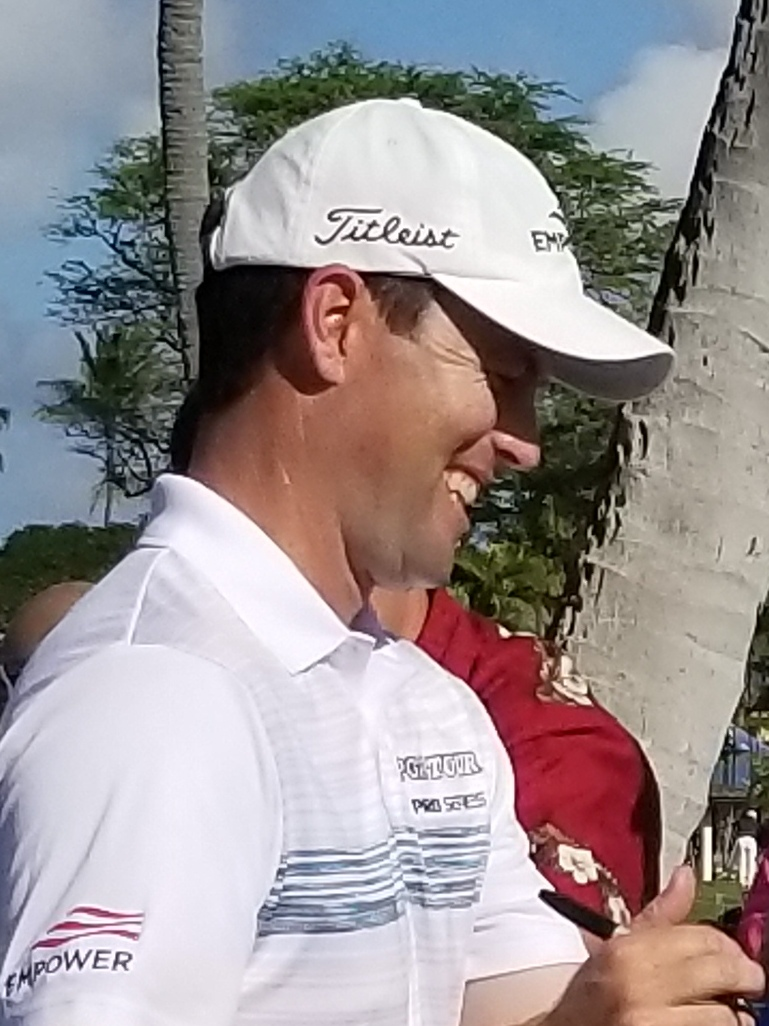
- Streb in 2018

Personal information
- Full name: Robert Charles Streb
- Nationality: United States
- Born: April 7, 1987 (age 39) Chickasha, Oklahoma, U.S.
- Height: 5 ft 10 in (1.78 m)
- Weight: 165 lb (75 kg; 11.8 st)
- Spouse: Maggie
- Children: 3

Career
- Sport: Golf
- College: Kansas State University
- Turned professional: 2009
- Current tour: PGA Tour
- Former tour: Web.com Tour
- Professional wins: 6
- Highest ranking: 31 (September 13, 2015)

Number of wins by tour
- PGA Tour: 2
- Korn Ferry Tour: 2
- Other: 2

Best results in major championships
- Masters Tournament: CUT: 2015, 2016, 2021
- PGA Championship: T7: 2016
- U.S. Open: T42: 2015
- The Open Championship: T18: 2015

Robert Charles Streb (born April 7, 1987) is an American professional golfer who plays on the PGA Tour where he has been a member since 2013.

== Early life and amateur career ==
Streb was born in Chickasha, Oklahoma, and earned All-American honors while playing collegiate golf at Kansas State University. He graduated in 2009.

== Professional career ==
In 2009, Streb turned professional. He is noted as a user of the ten-finger grip, which is unusual on the PGA Tour.

Streb played on the NGA Pro Golf Tour in 2010 and 2011 and the Web.com Tour in 2012. He won his first title on the Web.com Tour at the Mylan Classic in September, and finished T-3 at the BMW Charity Pro-Am and T-4 at the South Georgia Classic. He finished 7th on the 2012 money list to earn his PGA Tour card for 2013.

In his first PGA Tour season, Streb's best results were T-16 at the Humana Challenge, T-18 at the Honda Classic and T-22 at the Shell Houston Open. He finished 126th in the FedEx Cup standings, one spot short of the playoffs and fully exempt status for 2014. The next season, he was runner-up at the Zurich Classic of New Orleans and T-9 at the Deutsche Bank Championship. He finished 71st in the 2014 FedEx Cup.

In the 2015 PGA Tour season, Streb earned his first PGA Tour win at the 2014 McGladrey Classic at the Sea Island Golf Club on St. Simons Island, Georgia. He had six other top-10 finishes including a playoff loss at the Greenbrier Classic and an 18th place finish on the 2015 FedEx Cup Standings.

At the 2016 PGA Championship at Baltusrol Golf Club, Streb fired a second round 63 to tie the best round in a major and joined Jimmy Walker as the 36-hole leader in the event, with a 9 under par total. Streb carded a two-over-par 72 during the third round, that pushed him back into a tie for fifth entering the final round. He finished the tournament tied for seventh.

In November 2020, Streb won in a playoff over Kevin Kisner at the RSM Classic, giving him his second PGA Tour victory (both at the same tournament), and his first in six years.

== Professional wins (6) ==
=== PGA Tour wins (2) ===
No.	Date	Tournament	Winning score	Margin of victory	Runner(s)-up
1	Oct 26, 2014	McGladrey Classic	−14 (69-66-68-63=266)	Playoff	(Zimbabwe) Brendon de Jonge, (United States) Will MacKenzie
2	Nov 22, 2020	RSM Classic (2)	−19 (65-63-67-68=263)	Playoff	(United States) Kevin Kisner

PGA Tour playoff record (2–1)

No.	Year	Tournament	Opponent(s)	Result
1	2014	McGladrey Classic	(Zimbabwe) Brendon de Jonge, (United States) Will MacKenzie	Won with birdie on second extra hole MacKenzie eliminated by par on first hole
2	2015	Greenbrier Classic	(Canada) David Hearn, (United States) Kevin Kisner, (New Zealand) Danny Lee	Lee won with par on second extra hole Kisner and Streb eliminated by birdie on first hole
3	2020	RSM Classic	(United States) Kevin Kisner	Won with birdie on second extra hole

=== Web.com Tour wins (2) ===
Legend
Finals events (1)
Other Web.com Tour (1)

No.	Date	Tournament	Winning score	Margin of victory	Runners-up
1	Sep 2, 2012	Mylan Classic	−18 (64-69-69-64=266)	4 strokes	(Canada) Brad Fritsch, (United States) Cliff Kresge, (United States) Matt Weibring
2	Aug 26, 2018	Nationwide Children's Hospital Championship	−12 (65-68-68-71=272)	Playoff	(United States) Peter Malnati

Web.com Tour playoff record (1–0)

No.	Year	Tournament	Opponent	Result
1	2018	Nationwide Children's Hospital Championship	(United States) Peter Malnati	Won with par on first extra hole

=== Other wins (2) ===
- 2009 Oklahoma Open
- 2011 Oklahoma Open

== Results in major championships ==
Results not in chronological order in 2020.

! Tournament	2015	2016	2017	2018
Masters Tournament	CUT	CUT		
U.S. Open	T42	CUT		
The Open Championship	T18	CUT	CUT	
PGA Championship	T10	T7	T22	

! Tournament	2019	2020	2021
Masters Tournament			CUT
PGA Championship			T59
U.S. Open			
The Open Championship		NT	

Top 10
Did not play

CUT = missed the half-way cut
"T" = tied
NT = No tournament due to COVID-19 pandemic

=== Summary ===
Tournament	Wins	2nd	3rd	Top-5	Top-10	Top-25	Events	Cuts made
Masters Tournament	0	0	0	0	0	0	3	0
U.S. Open	0	0	0	0	0	0	2	1
The Open Championship	0	0	0	0	0	1	3	1
PGA Championship	0	0	0	0	2	3	4	4
Totals	0	0	0	0	2	4	12	6

- Most consecutive cuts made – 3 (2015 U.S. Open – 2015 PGA)
- Longest streak of top-10s – 1 (twice)

== Results in The Players Championship ==
Tournament	2015	2016	2017	2018	2019	2020	2021	2022	2023
The Players Championship	T30	CUT	CUT	CUT		C	CUT	CUT	CUT

CUT = missed the halfway cut
"T" indicates a tie for a place
C = Canceled after the first round due to the COVID-19 pandemic

== Results in World Golf Championships ==
Tournament	2015	2016	2017	2018	2019	2020	2021
Championship	T56	T52					
Match Play		T38				NT^{1}	
Invitational	5						T46
Champions	T35					NT^{1}	NT^{1}

^{1}Cancelled due to COVID-19 pandemic

Top 10
Did not play

NT = No tournament
"T" = Tied

== See also ==
- 2012 Web.com Tour graduates
- 2018 Web.com Tour Finals graduates
- 2019 Korn Ferry Tour Finals graduates
