= Danny Lee (golfer) =

New Zealand golfer (born 1990)

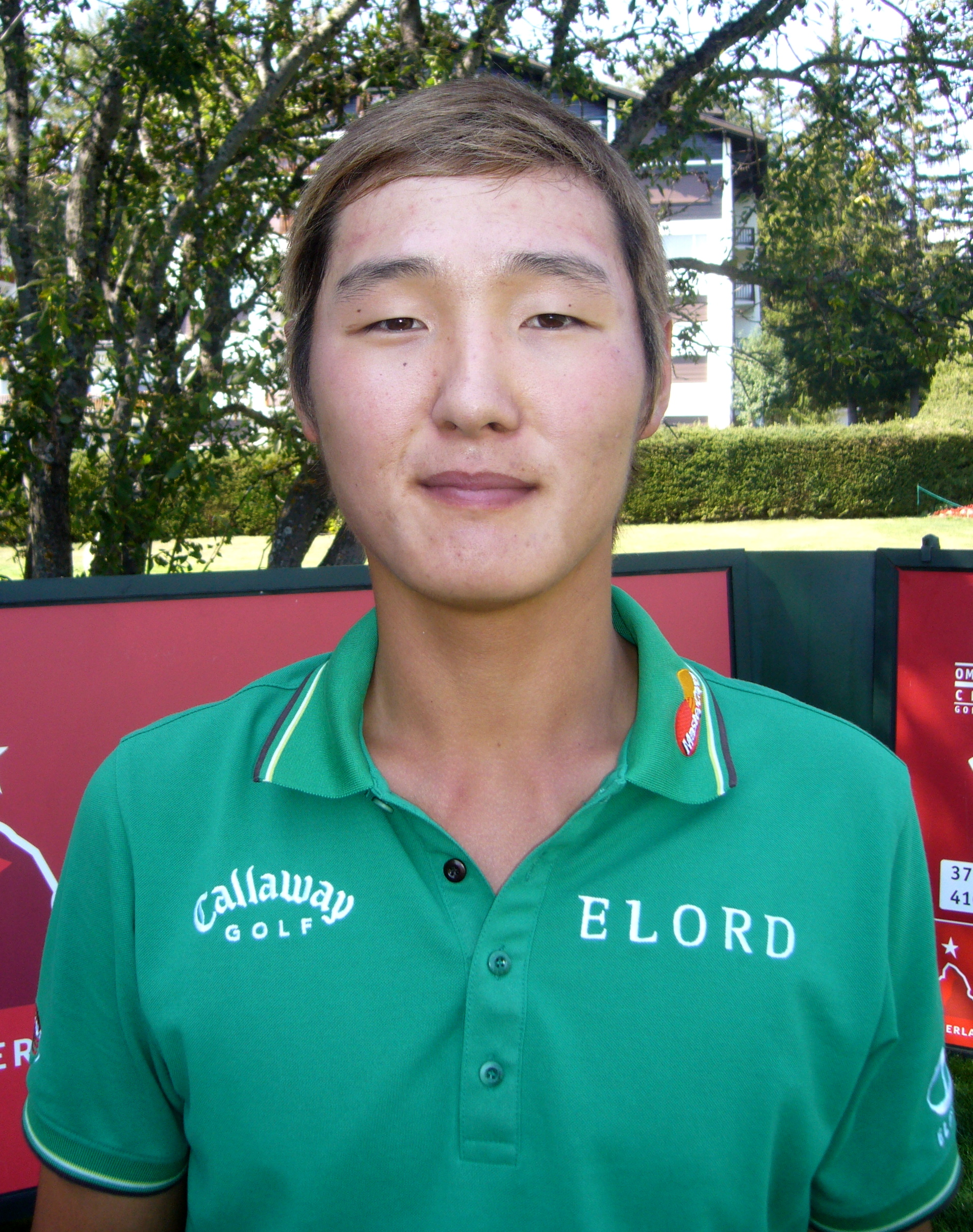
- Lee in 2009

Personal information
- Full name: Danny Jin-Myung Lee
- Nationality: New Zealand
- Born: 24 July 1990 (age 36) Incheon, South Korea
- Height: 6 ft 0 in (1.83 m)
- Weight: 168 lb (76 kg; 12.0 st)
- Spouse: Yoomi Kong (m. 2017)
- Children: 2

Career
- Sport: Golf
- Turned professional: 2009
- Current tour: LIV Golf
- Former tours: PGA Tour; European Tour; Web.com Tour
- Professional wins: 4
- Highest ranking: 34 (14 February 2016)

Number of wins by tour
- PGA Tour: 1
- European Tour: 1
- Asian Tour: 1
- PGA Tour of Australasia: 1
- Korn Ferry Tour: 1
- LIV Golf: 1

Best results in major championships
- Masters Tournament: T17: 2016
- PGA Championship: T36: 2019
- U.S. Open: T57: 2016
- The Open Championship: CUT: 2015, 2016

Achievements and awards
- Mark H. McCormack Medal: 2008

Danny Jin-Myung Lee (Korean: 이진명; born 24 July 1990) is a New Zealand professional golfer.

== Early life ==
Lee was born in Incheon, South Korea, and emigrated to New Zealand at the age of eight. He became a New Zealand citizen on 2 September 2008 in Rotorua, where he attended Rotorua Boys' High School.

== Amateur career ==
In August 2008, Lee became the youngest ever winner of the U.S. Amateur, aged 18 years and one month, six months younger than Tiger Woods when he won in 1994. His age record was broken the following year by 17-year-old An Byeong-hun. He became number one in the World Amateur Golf Ranking on 20 August 2008 and remained number one until he turned pro in April 2009. He was awarded the 2008 Mark H. McCormack Medal on 27 August.

In October 2008, Lee represented New Zealand at the Eisenhower Trophy in Adelaide, Australia. A final round 11-over 84 saw him finish T37 in the individual standings. The New Zealand team finished tied for 11th.

In February 2009, Lee won the Johnnie Walker Classic in Perth, Australia, a professional tournament co-sanctioned by the European, Asian, and Australasian tours. He was the youngest ever winner on the European Tour, surpassing Dale Hayes, and only the second amateur winner after Pablo Martín. The win took him to 159th place in the Official World Golf Ranking.

Lee's first major was the 2009 Masters Tournament, where his first round two-over 74 put him in a position to make the cut. In the second round he eagled the par-5 eighth and played the front nine in 34, but a six-putt led to quintuple bogey on the 10th, dropping him to five-over for the tournament. He was unable to recover, eventually finishing 11-over par.

== Professional career ==
=== European Tour ===
Lee turned professional after the 2009 Masters Tournament, forfeiting his guaranteed entry into the 2009 U.S. Open and the 2009 British Open as the 2008 U.S. Amateur champion.

In April, Lee signed a two-year endorsement contract with Callaway Golf, to use Callaway clubs, balls, and signage on his clothes. The company has not released how much his contract is worth, but sources say it is for US$1 million per year.

Lee was allowed to use seven sponsor exemptions during the PGA Tour season, and gained three other starts courtesy of his U.S. Amateur and Johnnie Walker Classic titles. His goal was to earn $537,958 which would have given him temporary membership and allowed him to receive an unlimited number of invitations. That figure is the amount earned by the player who finished 150th on the 2008 money list.

Lee made six out of eleven PGA Tour cuts after turning pro, with two top-25 finishes. He tied for 13th at the HP Byron Nelson Championship in May, and improved on his best finish in a PGA Tour event by finishing in a tie for 7th at the AT&T National in July. That top ten finish earned Lee a spot in the following week's John Deere Classic, meaning he did not have to use one of his two remaining sponsor exemptions. The money from his T-7 finish put him $187,904 away from earning temporary status on tour. Lee missed the cut by two strokes at the John Deere Classic after bogeying the last two holes of his second round. Lee missed the cut again three weeks later at the Buick Open.

In August, Lee became the youngest player to play in a World Golf Championship event when he played the WGC-Bridgestone Invitational. He finished T51 at the event. He made the cut but did not finish at the Wyndham Championship two weeks later. He used his last sponsor exemption of the season to play in that tournament and did not earn enough money on tour to earn his card for 2010.

Lee then switched his focus to the European Tour, as well as playing selected events in Asia. He made his maiden appearance as a professional in Europe at the Johnnie Walker Championship at Gleneagles where he finished T10. As a drawcard for the Korea Open and the Coca-Cola Tokai Classic in Japan, he played the first two rounds of both events with fellow teen prodigy Ryo Ishikawa.

Lee entered the PGA Tour's qualifying school at the first stage level, beginning his campaign in McKinney, Texas on 20 October. Needing to finish in roughly the top third of the field, rounds of 72-78-69-76 saw him fall well short of advancing to the second stage.

After arriving back in Asia for the Singapore Open, Lee cited swing changes, illness and cold weather as reasons for his disappointing performance in Texas, and confirmed an intention to play mainly on the European Tour in 2010. He also announced he had signed Korean-born Suckki Jang, an affiliate of Hank Haney, as his new coach. He then played the WGC-HSBC Champions, the Hong Kong Open, and represented New Zealand with David Smail at the Omega Mission Hills World Cup, all with limited success.

Lee made a poor start to the 2010 season, making just two cuts in his first nine events on the European Tour.

On the eve of the BMW PGA Championship in May, Lee announced a new partnership with English caddy Peter Coleman. "I finally feel that I am in the right position with my swing and that has got me really excited," Lee said.

However, after receiving a sponsor's invite to play the RBC Canadian Open in July, Lee stated he was now without a swing coach. He added that he had been through several coaches since turning professional and had perhaps become too technical with his mechanics, and was now trying to focus more on playing than tweaking his swing.

Lee eventually finished the Race to Dubai in 159th place, making 10 out of 20 cuts with a best finish of T21 at the BMW International Open in June.

=== Nationwide Tour ===
Late in the year, he successfully negotiated the first two stages of PGA Tour qualifying school in California. At the final stage in Florida, Lee shot rounds of 74-72-69-65-72-74 to finish T64. His placing earned him full Nationwide Tour playing rights, allowing him to plan a 35-event, two-tour itinerary for 2011.

Lee began a noticeable return to form a couple of months into the new year. A tie for 7th in the Chitimacha Louisiana Open was followed by a strong showing for 54 holes at the Malaysian Open, eventually being disqualified for signing an incorrect final round scorecard (denying him a tie for 17th). The next week he tied for 2nd at the Volvo China Open, four shots behind winner Nicolas Colsaerts.

In May, a tie for 5th in the Stadion Classic at UGA was followed by an outright third at the BMW Charity Pro-Am.

In June he injured his left wrist during an Open Championship qualifier, forcing his withdrawal and a four-week break from competition. Diagnosed as tendonitis, he worked with his caddy in American events, Jeff Belen, on grip and swing adjustments. By early September he had posted three further Nationwide Tour top-10 finishes, including a tie for 2nd at the Cox Classic.

In early October, Lee won the WNB Golf Classic in Texas, beating Harris English in a playoff. The $94,500 first prize lifted him to 4th on the money list, assuring him of a place inside the final money list's top 25, those being the players who gain PGA Tour cards for the following season.

"It feels great to win again," Lee said. "I haven't won a tournament since I won the 2009 Johnnie Walker Classic and it's a great feeling. It's not easy to win and I worked really hard with my uncle and my coach (Bill Choung) for this. I'm really happy it worked." Lee credited the switch to a belly putter in this event as beneficial, and came after pulling out of the previous week's event after 27 holes citing his wrist injury.

Lee finished sixth on tour with earnings of $326,100, making 13 of 18 cuts with nine top-10s. He had the season's lowest scoring average of 68.98.

=== PGA Tour ===
Lee entered the new season with PGA Tour and European Tour cards. He said he was still keen to play a two-tour schedule, however his main focus would be on America. He made only 13 cuts in 26 events on the PGA Tour and lost his tour card. He did not play on the European Tour.

After striking up a successful partnership late in the Nationwide Tour season, Lee said he would have Australian Graeme Courts, a former long-time caddy of Loren Roberts, working for him on the PGA Tour.

K. J. Choi introduced Lee to another Australian, Steve Bann, as a potential coach. "I am close with K.J. Choi and he said I was thinking too much about my swing," Lee said. "I was always working on something and I am too technical sometimes so K.J. introduced me to Steve. Steve is a simple guy who is teaching me how to practise with better routine and how to trust my own game and not think too much.

Lee played on the Web.com Tour in 2013, finishing 15th on the regular season money list to regain his PGA Tour card for 2014. His best finish was second at the Rex Hospital Open.

On the back of six straight missed cuts, Lee adopted a claw putting grip for the Puerto Rico Open in March. He credited the change of putting style for yielding him an instant result; a runner-up finish, two shots behind winner Chesson Hadley.

In the 2015 PGA Tour fall season, Lee finished third at the OHL Classic at Mayakoba. In the spring, he finished seventh at the Valspar Championship and tenth at the Crowne Plaza Invitational at Colonial. He won his first PGA Tour event in July at the Greenbrier Classic. The next week he finished fourth at the John Deere Classic. In August he finished fourth at the Quicken Loans National and sixth at the WGC-Bridgestone Invitational. With a runner-up finish at the Tour Championship, he finished 9th in the FedEx Cup standings.

In the 2019 PGA Championship, Lee announced he was now working with golf coach George Gankas which was netting him a significant increase in length off his tee shots; especially his driver. He opened with a 64 (−6) and was only one off Brooks Koepka's lead. He then followed with scores of 74, 71, and 77 to finish tied for 36th.

At the 2020 U.S. Open, Lee made the 36 hole cut, but later withdrew from the championship after the third round citing a wrist injury; he had earlier taken six putts from close range on the final hole.

Lee played using Parsons Xtreme Golf equipment during the 2021 season following his departure from TaylorMade.

=== LIV Golf ===
Following his appearance at the Genesis Invitational on the PGA Tour in February, Lee joined LIV Golf ahead of its second season.

== Personal life ==
Lee married Yoomi Kong in 2017. Together they have two children, Roi and Robin. Lee and Kong divorced in 2022.

== Amateur wins ==
- 2007 South Island Amateur (New Zealand), New Zealand Amateur
- 2008 Lake Macquarie Amateur, North Island Amateur (New Zealand), Western Amateur, U.S. Amateur
- 2009 Georgia Cup

== Professional wins (4) ==
=== PGA Tour wins (1) ===
No.	Date	Tournament	Winning score	Margin of victory	Runners-up
1	5 Jul 2015	Greenbrier Classic	−13 (63-69-68-67=267)	Playoff	(Canada) David Hearn, (United States) Kevin Kisner, (United States) Robert Streb

PGA Tour playoff record (1–0)

No.	Year	Tournament	Opponents	Result
1	2015	Greenbrier Classic	(Canada) David Hearn, (United States) Kevin Kisner, (United States) Robert Streb	Won with par on second extra hole Kisner and Streb eliminated by birdie on first hole

=== European Tour wins (1) ===
No.	Date	Tournament	Winning score	Margin of victory	Runners-up
1	22 Feb 2009	Johnnie Walker Classic^{1} (as an amateur)	−17 (67-68-69-67=271)	1 stroke	(Chile) Felipe Aguilar, (Japan) Hiroyuki Fujita, (England) Ross McGowan

^{1}Co-sanctioned by the Asian Tour and the PGA Tour of Australasia

=== Nationwide Tour wins (1) ===
No.	Date	Tournament	Winning score	Margin of victory	Runner-up
1	2 Oct 2011	WNB Golf Classic	−18 (64-72-68-66=270)	Playoff	(United States) Harris English

Nationwide Tour playoff record (1–0)

No.	Year	Tournament	Opponent	Result
1	2011	WNB Golf Classic	(United States) Harris English	Won with par on first extra hole

=== LIV Golf League wins (1) ===
No.	Date	Tournament	Winning score	Margin of victory	Runners-up
1	19 Mar 2023	LIV Golf Tucson^{1}	−9 (68-67-69=204)	Playoff	(South Africa) Louis Oosthuizen, (Mexico) Carlos Ortiz, (United States) Brendan Steele

^{1}Co-sanctioned by the MENA Tour

LIV Golf League playoff record (1–0)

No.	Year	Tournament	Opponents	Result
1	2023	LIV Golf Tucson	(South Africa) Louis Oosthuizen, (Mexico) Carlos Ortiz, (United States) Brendan Steele	Won with birdie on second extra hole Ortiz eliminated by par on first hole

== Results in major championships ==
Results not in chronological order in 2020.

Tournament	2009	2010	2011	2012	2013	2014	2015	2016	2017	2018
Masters Tournament	CUT							T17		
U.S. Open							CUT	T57		
The Open Championship							CUT	CUT		
PGA Championship							T43	T56	CUT	

Tournament	2019	2020	2021	2022
Masters Tournament				
PGA Championship	T36	T71		
U.S. Open		WD		CUT
The Open Championship		NT		

Did not play

CUT = missed the half-way cut
"T" indicates a tie for a place
WD = withdrew
NT = No tournament due to COVID-19 pandemic

=== Summary ===
Tournament	Wins	2nd	3rd	Top-5	Top-10	Top-25	Events	Cuts made
Masters Tournament	0	0	0	0	0	1	2	1
PGA Championship	0	0	0	0	0	0	5	4
U.S. Open	0	0	0	0	0	0	4	2
The Open Championship	0	0	0	0	0	0	2	0
Totals	0	0	0	0	0	1	13	7

- Most consecutive cuts made – 3 (twice)
- Longest streak of top-10s – 0

== Results in The Players Championship ==
Tournament	2015	2016	2017	2018	2019	2020	2021	2022
The Players Championship	CUT	T35	CUT	T7	CUT	C	CUT	WD

Top 10

CUT = missed the halfway cut
"T" indicates a tie for a place
WD = withdrew
C = Cancelled after the first round due to the COVID-19 pandemic

== Results in World Golf Championships ==
Results not in chronological order before 2015.

Tournament	2009	2010	2011	2012	2013	2014	2015	2016
Championship								T42
Match Play								T51
Invitational	T51						T6	56
Champions	T66						T58	

Top 10
Did not play

QF, R16, R32, R64 = Round in which player lost in match play
"T" = tied

== PGA Tour and European Tour career summary ==
	PGA Tour			European Tour		
Season	Wins	Earnings (US$)	Money list	Wins	Earnings (€)	Order of Merit
2009	0	359,846	n/a †	1	110,543	164
2010	0	0	–	0	88,257	159
2011	0	0	–	0	358,477	84
2012	0	359,112	166	0	0	–
2013	0	112,000	n/a †	0	0	–
2014	0	781,295	120	0	0	–
2015	1	3,965,933	11	0	233,265	n/a †
2016	0	1,405,722	75	0	477,951	n/a †
2017	0	1,611,331	68	0	0	–
2018	0	1,269,386	98	0	0	–
2019	0	1,524,126	75	0	43,178	n/a †
2020	0	2,043,764	40	0	16,292	n/a †
2021	0	347,862	183	0	0	n/a †
2022	0	1,265,934	102	0	0	n/a †
2023	0	316,795	118	0	0	n/a †
Career*	1	15,363,106	117	1	1,432,052	n/a

* Complete as of 20 February 2023.
† Lee was not ranked because he was not a member.

== Team appearances ==
Amateur

- Nomura Cup (representing New Zealand): 2007
- Eisenhower Trophy (representing New Zealand): 2008
- Bonallack Trophy (representing Asia/Pacific): 2008
- Sloan Morpeth Trophy (representing New Zealand): 2007 (winners), 2008

Professional

- World Cup (representing New Zealand): 2009, 2016
- Presidents Cup (representing the International team): 2015

== See also ==
- 2011 Nationwide Tour graduates
- 2013 Web.com Tour Finals graduates
