= Kevin Na =

Korean-American golfer (born 1983)

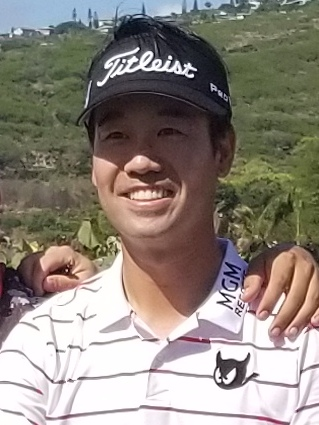
- Na in 2018

Personal information
- Full name: Kevin Sangwook Na
- Nationality: United States; South Korea
- Born: September 15, 1983 (age 43) Seoul, South Korea
- Height: 5 ft 11 in (1.80 m)
- Weight: 167 lb (76 kg; 11.9 st)
- Spouse: Julianne Na (m. 2017)
- Children: 3

Career
- Sport: Golf
- Turned professional: 2001
- Former tours: PGA Tour; Asian Tour; LIV Golf
- Professional wins: 9
- Highest ranking: 19 (November 1, 2015)

Number of wins by tour
- PGA Tour: 5
- Asian Tour: 1
- Korn Ferry Tour: 1
- Other: 2

Best results in major championships
- Masters Tournament: T12: 2012, 2015, 2021
- PGA Championship: T10: 2011
- U.S. Open: 7th: 2016
- The Open Championship: T22: 2016

Achievements and awards
- Asian PGA Tour Rookie of the Year: 2002

Kevin Sangwook Na (Korean: 나상욱; born September 15, 1983) is a Korean American professional golfer. He was a member of the PGA Tour until June 2022, when he resigned in order to join LIV Golf. He won five tournaments on the PGA Tour between 2011 and 2021.

== Early life ==
In 1983, Na was born in Seoul, South Korea. He emigrated with his family to the United States when he was eight years old, settling in southern California. He left Diamond Bar High School after his junior year to play professional golf at age 17.

== Professional career ==
Na has played on the Asian Tour (with a win at the 2002 Volvo Masters of Asia), European Tour and PGA Tour. He got his PGA Tour card for the 2004 season. He finished third at the Southern Farm Bureau Classic and fourth at the Honda Classic. In 2005 he finished second at the FBR Open and Chrysler Classic of Tucson. He missed six months with a hand injury in 2006. In his first start back, a rehab start on the Nationwide Tour, he won the Mark Christopher Charity Classic.

Na played on the PGA Tour in 2007 via a medical extension, and finished fourth at the Verizon Heritage. In 2008 he was fourth at the FBR Open and Sony Open in Hawaii. He finished third at the 2009 Players Championship and the FBR Open, fifth at the Sony Open in Hawaii, Mayakoba Golf Classic and Reno-Tahoe Open. With nine top-10 finishes and 14 top-25 finishes, he ranked in 19th place on the money list, securing his entry to the Masters Tournament and the U.S. Open in 2010 for the first time.

In the 2010 season, Na finished second at the Arnold Palmer Invitational and third at the BMW Championship. He placed 37th in season earnings.

In February 2011, Na was in contention to win his first PGA Tour title at the Northern Trust Open. He entered the final round in a tie for 2nd at −9, one stroke behind Aaron Baddeley. However a run of four bogeys in the first ten holes ended Na's chances of victory. He would eventually fight back on the back nine and a vital birdie on the par-five 17th sealed a third-place finish, behind eventual winner Baddeley and Vijay Singh.

On April 14, 2011, Na played the worst ever par-4 hole on the PGA Tour since the tour began recording hole-by-hole scores in 1983, making a 16 on the ninth hole at the Valero Texas Open. Na needed extra shots after an unplayable lie from his tee shot and was then given a two-stroke penalty after his ball hit a tree and rebounded back onto him. It was initially scored as a 15 but changed to 16 on review. Na ended up shooting an eight-over-par round of 80, which saw him shoot four-under for his other 17 holes.

In August 2011, Na finished tenth at the PGA Championship with a 72-69-70-67 score card. He also finished fifth at the Bob Hope Classic and Wells Fargo Championship.

On October 1, 2011, Na apparently whiffed his tee shot on the par-4 15th hole in the third round of the Justin Timberlake Shriners Hospitals for Children Open at TPC Summerlin in Las Vegas, missing high and to the outside of the ball. Tour officials, though, ruled Na was not intending to hit the ball and did not count the swing as a stroke, and Na finished with a 5-under 66 to remain tied for the tournament lead. The following day, Na earned his first PGA Tour victory at the 211th attempt, having been on tour for eight years. He shot a final round 65 with birdies at 15, 16 and 17 to win by two strokes from Nick Watney and earn $792,000 in prize money. Na also broke the tournament scoring record of 21-under par when he finished the week at 23-under par. This victory earned Na a two-year exemption on tour. He ranked 30th in season earnings.

During the 2012 PGA Tour season, Na finished fourth at the Arnold Palmer Invitational, fifth at the Phoenix Open and AT&T Pebble Beach National Pro-Am, seventh at the Players Championship and 12th at Masters Tournament.

A back injury limited Na to eight starts in early 2013. After rehabbing, he made a comeback in October in his first PGA Tour start since April with a third-place finish at the Frys.com Open. Na was given 18 starts on a medical extension, but needed only seven to remain on the PGA Tour.

In 2014 he finished second at the Memorial Tournament and Valspar Championship, third at the Frys.com Open, fourth at the AT&T Pebble Beach National Pro-Am, ninth at The Barclays and 12th at the U.S. Open. He finished 20th in season earnings.

Na lost in a sudden-death playoff to Emiliano Grillo at the 2016 PGA Tour season opening Frys.com Open. After both players finished at 15-under-par, Grillo won the event with a birdie on the second extra hole. Na hit his second shot to the par-five 18th off-line and was trapped behind a tree, which resulted in a bogey. This allowed Grillo to two-putt out for the victory.

At the 2016 U.S. Open at Oakmont Country Club, Na finished in 7th place after shooting 75-68-69-69 for a total of 1 over par. This is his best finish in 24 major championship appearances.

Na won his second PGA Tour event, A Military Tribute at The Greenbrier, in 2018. He carded a 6-under 64 en route to a -19 tournament score. This was his first PGA Tour win since 2011.

Na claimed his third PGA Tour win, with a four shot victory at the Charles Schwab Challenge in 2019. Na carded a 62 in the second round and ended with a final round of 66, which included four birdies in the first eight holes to finish the tournament at −13 ahead of Tony Finau.

In October 2019, Na won his fourth PGA Tour title. The tournament ended on the second sudden-death playoff hole at the Shriners Hospitals for Children Open at TPC Summerlin in Las Vegas. The playoff started when Na and Patrick Cantlay ended the final group at −23. Na is now 1 for 4 in PGA Tour sudden-death playoffs.

In January 2021, Na won his fifth PGA Tour event at the Sony Open in Hawaii. He came from three strokes behind with six to play to claim a one-stroke victory. In August later that year, Na tied for the lead after 72 holes with five other players at the Wyndham Championship. Kevin Kisner took the title in the playoff. In September 2021, Na finished third at the Tour Championship at East Lake Golf Club in Atlanta, Georgia. This won him $4,000,000 in the season long FedEx Cup.

In June 2022, Na announced his resignation from the PGA Tour, confirming that he would be joining the LIV Golf Invitational Series.

== Personal life ==
Na is a naturalized American citizen, and lives in Las Vegas, Nevada.

Na is married to Julianne Na. The couple have three children: Sophia, Leo, and Logan.

== Professional wins (9) ==
=== PGA Tour wins (5) ===
No.	Date	Tournament	Winning score	To par	Margin of victory	Runner(s)-up
1	Oct 2, 2011	Justin Timberlake Shriners Hospitals for Children Open	67-63-66-65=261	−23	2 strokes	(United States) Nick Watney
2	Jul 8, 2018	A Military Tribute at The Greenbrier	69-63-65-64=261	−19	5 strokes	(United States) Kelly Kraft
3	May 26, 2019	Charles Schwab Challenge	70-62-69-66=267	−13	4 strokes	(United States) Tony Finau
4	Oct 6, 2019	Shriners Hospitals for Children Open (2)	68-62-61-70=261	−23	Playoff	(United States) Patrick Cantlay
5	Jan 17, 2021	Sony Open in Hawaii	67-66-61-65=259	−21	1 stroke	(United States) Chris Kirk, (Chile) Joaquín Niemann

PGA Tour playoff record (1–4)

No.	Year	Tournament	Opponent(s)	Result
1	2005	Chrysler Classic of Tucson	(Australia) Geoff Ogilvy, (United States) Mark Calcavecchia	Ogilvy won with birdie on second extra hole Calcavecchia eliminated by par on first hole
2	2014	Memorial Tournament	(Japan) Hideki Matsuyama	Lost to par on first extra hole
3	2015	Frys.com Open	(Argentina) Emiliano Grillo	Lost to birdie on second extra hole
4	2019	Shriners Hospitals for Children Open	(United States) Patrick Cantlay	Won with par on second extra hole
5	2021	Wyndham Championship	(South Africa) Branden Grace, (South Korea) Kim Si-woo, (United States) Kevin Kisner, (Australia) Adam Scott, (Canada) Roger Sloan	Kisner won with birdie on second extra hole

=== Asian PGA Tour wins (1) ===
No.	Date	Tournament	Winning score	To par	Margin of victory	Runners-up
1	Dec 8, 2002	Volvo Masters of Asia	69-66-71-66=272	−16	2 strokes	(South Africa) Craig Kamps, (United States) Anthony Kang, (India) Arjun Singh, (Scotland) Simon Yates

=== Nationwide Tour wins (1) ===
No.	Date	Tournament	Winning score	To par	Margin of victory	Runners-up
1	Oct 8, 2006	Mark Christopher Charity Classic	62-66-71-69=268	−16	3 strokes	(United States) Jeff Quinney, (United States) Chris Tidland

=== Other wins (2) ===
No.	Date	Tournament	Winning score	To par	Margin of victory	Runner(s)-up
1	Jul 28, 2002	Long Beach Open	66-64-75-63=268	−20	3 strokes	(United States) Mike Cunning
2	Dec 12, 2021	QBE Shootout (with (United States) Jason Kokrak)	59-64-60=183	−33	1 stroke	(United States) Sam Burns and (United States) Billy Horschel

== Playoff record ==
Korean Tour playoff record (0–1)

No.	Year	Tournament	Opponent	Result
1	2012	Shinhan Donghae Open	(South Korea) Kim Meen-whee	Lost to par on first extra hole

== Results in major championships ==
Results not in chronological order in 2020.

Tournament	2005	2006	2007	2008	2009
Masters Tournament					
U.S. Open					
The Open Championship					
PGA Championship	CUT				T43

Tournament	2010	2011	2012	2013	2014	2015	2016	2017	2018
Masters Tournament	CUT	CUT	T12	59		T12	T55	CUT	
U.S. Open	CUT	CUT	T29		T12	T46	7	T32	
The Open Championship	T27	CUT	CUT		T54	T58	T22	T44	T51
PGA Championship	T58	T10	WD		CUT	CUT	T22	CUT	T19

Tournament	2019	2020	2021	2022	2023
Masters Tournament	T46	T13	T12	T14	WD
PGA Championship	CUT	CUT	CUT	T23	
U.S. Open	CUT	CUT	CUT	CUT	
The Open Championship		NT		CUT	

Top 10
Did not play

CUT = missed the half-way cut
WD = withdrew
"T" = tied
NT = No tournament due to COVID-19 pandemic

=== Summary ===
Tournament	Wins	2nd	3rd	Top-5	Top-10	Top-25	Events	Cuts made
Masters Tournament	0	0	0	0	0	5	12	8
PGA Championship	0	0	0	0	1	4	14	6
U.S. Open	0	0	0	0	1	2	11	5
The Open Championship	0	0	0	0	0	1	9	6
Totals	0	0	0	0	2	12	46	25

- Most consecutive cuts made – 4 (2016 Masters – 2016 PGA)
- Longest streak of top-10s – 1 (twice)

== Results in The Players Championship ==
Tournament	2005	2006	2007	2008	2009
The Players Championship	CUT	CUT		T54	T3

Tournament	2010	2011	2012	2013	2014	2015	2016	2017	2018	2019
The Players Championship	CUT	CUT	T7		T38	T6	CUT	WD	T46	78

Tournament	2020	2021
The Players Championship	C	WD

Top 10
Did not play

CUT = missed the halfway cut
WD = withdrew
"T" indicates a tie for a place
C = Canceled after the first round due to the COVID-19 pandemic

== Results in World Golf Championships ==
Results not in chronological order before 2015.

Tournament	2003	2004	2005	2006	2007	2008	2009	2010	2011	2012	2013	2014	2015	2016	2017	2018	2019
Championship								T50	T35				T9	T35	T52		T36
Match Play								R64		R64			T34	17	R16	T52	QF
Invitational	T71									T63		T23	T15	T27		T31	T43
Champions												T20	57	T54		T54	

Tournament	2020	2021	2022
Championship	T9	T11	
Match Play	NT^{1}	T42	R16
Invitational	T35	T23	
Champions	NT^{1}	NT^{1}	NT^{1}

^{1}Cancelled due to COVID-19 pandemic

Top 10
Did not play

QF, R16, R32, R64 = Round in which player lost in match play
NT = No tournament
"T" = Tied
Note that the HSBC Champions did not become a WGC event until 2009.
Note that the Championship and Invitational were discontinued from 2022.

== See also ==
- 2003 PGA Tour Qualifying School graduates
