= 2016–17 PGA Tour =

Golf tour season

2016–17 PGA Tour season
- Duration: October 13, 2016 – September 24, 2017
- Number of official events: 47
- Most wins: (United States) Justin Thomas (5)
- FedEx Cup: (United States) Justin Thomas
- Money list: (United States) Justin Thomas
- PGA Tour Player of the Year: (United States) Justin Thomas
- PGA Player of the Year: (United States) Justin Thomas
- Rookie of the Year: (United States) Xander Schauffele

The 2016–17 PGA Tour was the 102nd season of the PGA Tour, the main professional golf tour in the United States. It was also the 49th season since separating from the PGA of America, and the 11th edition of the FedEx Cup.

== Schedule ==
The following table lists official events during the 2016–17 season.

Date	Tournament	Location	Purse (US$)	Winner(s) (Note: The number in parentheses after each winner's name is the number of PGA Tour events they had won up to and including that tournament. This information is only shown for PGA Tour members.)	OWGR points	Other tours (Note: ASA − Asian Tour.)	Notes
Oct 16	Safeway Open	California	6,000,000	(United States) Brendan Steele (2)	38		
Oct 23	CIMB Classic	Malaysia	7,000,000	(United States) Justin Thomas (2)	50	ASA	Limited-field event
Oct 30	WGC-HSBC Champions	China	9,500,000	(Japan) Hideki Matsuyama (3)	70		World Golf Championship
Oct 30	Sanderson Farms Championship	Mississippi	4,200,000	(United States) Cody Gribble (1)	24		Alternate event
Nov 6	Shriners Hospitals for Children Open	Nevada	6,600,000	(Australia) Rod Pampling (3)	36		
Nov 13	OHL Classic at Mayakoba	Mexico	7,000,000	(United States) Pat Perez (2)	30		
Nov 21	RSM Classic	Georgia	6,000,000	(Canada) Mackenzie Hughes (1)	32		
Jan 8	SBS Tournament of Champions	Hawaii	6,100,000	(United States) Justin Thomas (3)	50		Winners-only event
Jan 15	Sony Open in Hawaii	Hawaii	6,000,000	(United States) Justin Thomas (4)	50		
Jan 22	CareerBuilder Challenge	California	5,800,000	(United States) Hudson Swafford (1)	42		Pro-Am
Jan 29	Farmers Insurance Open	California	6,700,000	(Spain) Jon Rahm (1)	54		
Feb 5	Waste Management Phoenix Open	Arizona	6,700,000	(Japan) Hideki Matsuyama (4)	56		
Feb 12	AT&T Pebble Beach Pro-Am	California	7,200,000	(United States) Jordan Spieth (9)	52		Pro-Am
Feb 19	Genesis Open	California	7,000,000	(United States) Dustin Johnson (13)	66		
Feb 26	The Honda Classic	Florida	6,400,000	(United States) Rickie Fowler (4)	54		
Mar 5	WGC-Mexico Championship	Mexico	9,750,000	(United States) Dustin Johnson (14)	76		World Golf Championship
Mar 12	Valspar Championship	Florida	6,300,000	(Canada) Adam Hadwin (1)	48		
Mar 19	Arnold Palmer Invitational	Florida	8,700,000	(Australia) Marc Leishman (2)	62		Invitational
Mar 26	WGC-Dell Technologies Match Play	Texas	9,750,000	(United States) Dustin Johnson (15)	74		World Golf Championship
Mar 26	Puerto Rico Open	Puerto Rico	3,000,000	(United States) D. A. Points (3)	24		Alternate event
Apr 2	Shell Houston Open	Texas	7,000,000	(United States) Russell Henley (3)	50		
Apr 9	Masters Tournament	Georgia	11,000,000	(Spain) Sergio García (10)	100		Major championship
Apr 16	RBC Heritage	South Carolina	6,500,000	(United States) Wesley Bryan (1)	48		Invitational
Apr 23	Valero Texas Open	Texas	6,200,000	(United States) Kevin Chappell (1)	38		
May 1	Zurich Classic of New Orleans	Louisiana	7,100,000	(Sweden) Jonas Blixt (3) and (Australia) Cameron Smith (1)	n/a		Team event
May 7	Wells Fargo Championship	North Carolina	7,500,000	(United States) Brian Harman (2)	50		
May 14	The Players Championship	Florida	10,500,000	(South Korea) Kim Si-woo (2)	80		Flagship event
May 21	AT&T Byron Nelson	Texas	7,500,000	(United States) Billy Horschel (4)	50		
May 28	Dean & DeLuca Invitational	Texas	6,900,000	(United States) Kevin Kisner (2)	50		Invitational
Jun 4	Memorial Tournament	Ohio	8,700,000	(United States) Jason Dufner (5)	66		Invitational
Jun 11	FedEx St. Jude Classic	Tennessee	6,400,000	(United States) Daniel Berger (2)	38		
Jun 18	U.S. Open	Wisconsin	12,000,000	(United States) Brooks Koepka (2)	100		Major championship
Jun 25	Travelers Championship	Connecticut	6,800,000	(United States) Jordan Spieth (10)	52		
Jul 2	Quicken Loans National	Maryland	7,100,000	(United States) Kyle Stanley (2)	42		Invitational
Jul 9	Greenbrier Classic	West Virginia	7,100,000	(United States) Xander Schauffele (1)	34		
Jul 16	John Deere Classic	Illinois	5,600,000	(United States) Bryson DeChambeau (1)	30		
Jul 23	The Open Championship	England	10,250,000	(United States) Jordan Spieth (11)	100		Major championship
Jul 23	Barbasol Championship	Alabama	3,500,000	(United States) Grayson Murray (1)	24		Alternate event
Jul 30	RBC Canadian Open	Canada	6,000,000	(Venezuela) Jhonattan Vegas (3)	38		
Aug 6	WGC-Bridgestone Invitational	Ohio	9,750,000	(Japan) Hideki Matsuyama (5)	76		World Golf Championship
Aug 6	Barracuda Championship	Nevada	3,300,000	(United States) Chris Stroud (1)	24		Alternate event
Aug 13	PGA Championship	North Carolina	10,500,000	(United States) Justin Thomas (5)	100		Major championship
Aug 20	Wyndham Championship	North Carolina	5,800,000	(Sweden) Henrik Stenson (6)	34		
Aug 27	The Northern Trust	New York	8,750,000	(United States) Dustin Johnson (16)	74		FedEx Cup playoff event
Sep 4	Dell Technologies Championship	Massachusetts	8,750,000	(United States) Justin Thomas (6)	74		FedEx Cup playoff event
Sep 17	BMW Championship	Illinois	8,750,000	(Australia) Marc Leishman (3)	72		FedEx Cup playoff event
Sep 24	Tour Championship	Georgia	8,750,000	(United States) Xander Schauffele (2)	60		FedEx Cup playoff event

=== Unofficial events ===
The following events were sanctioned by the PGA Tour, but did not carry FedEx Cup points or official money, nor were wins official.

Date	Tournament	Location	Purse ($)	Winner(s)	OWGR points	Notes
Nov 27	ISPS Handa World Cup of Golf	Australia	8,000,000	(Denmark) Søren Kjeldsen and (Denmark) Thorbjørn Olesen	n/a	Team event
Dec 4	Hero World Challenge	Bahamas	3,500,000	(Japan) Hideki Matsuyama	46	Limited-field event
Dec 10	Franklin Templeton Shootout	Florida	3,100,000	(United States) Harris English and (United States) Matt Kuchar	n/a	Team event
Jun 19	CVS Health Charity Classic	Rhode Island	1,500,000	(United States) Billy Andrade, (United States) Keegan Bradley and (Canada) Brooke Henderson	n/a	Team event
Oct 1	Presidents Cup	New Jersey	n/a	Team USA	n/a	Team event

== Location of tournaments ==
Location of official tournaments of the 2016–17 PGA Tour in the continental United States and Canada.
600-point event (Players & Majors)
550-point event (World Golf Championships)
500-point event (Regular events)
Official team event
300-point event (Alternate events)
FedEx Cup playoff event
Location of official tournaments of the 2016–17 PGA Tour outside the continental United States and Canada.
600-point event (Players & Majors)
550-point event (World Golf Championships)
500-point event (Regular events)
300-point event (Alternate events)

== FedEx Cup ==
=== Final standings ===
For full rankings, see 2017 FedEx Cup Playoffs.

Final top 10 players in the FedEx Cup:

Position	Player	Points	Bonus money ($)
1	(United States) Justin Thomas	3,000	10,000,000
2	(United States) Jordan Spieth	2,340	3,000,000
3	(United States) Xander Schauffele	2,151	2,000,000
4	(United States) Dustin Johnson	1,720	1,500,000
5	(Spain) Jon Rahm	1,620	1,000,000
6	(Australia) Marc Leishman	1,441	800,000
7	(United States) Rickie Fowler	1,253	700,000
8	(Japan) Hideki Matsuyama	1,093	600,000
9	(England) Justin Rose	1,080	550,000
10	(United States) Brooks Koepka	1,040	500,000

== Money list ==
The money list was based on prize money won during the season, calculated in U.S. dollars.

Position	Player	Prize money ($)
1	(United States) Justin Thomas	9,921,560
2	(United States) Jordan Spieth	9,433,033
3	(United States) Dustin Johnson	8,732,193
4	(Japan) Hideki Matsuyama	8,380,570
5	(Spain) Jon Rahm	6,123,248
6	(United States) Rickie Fowler	6,083,197
7	(Australia) Marc Leishman	5,866,390
8	(United States) Brooks Koepka	5,612,397
9	(United States) Kevin Kisner	4,766,936
10	(United States) Brian Harman	4,396,470

== Awards ==
Award	Winner	Ref.
PGA Tour Player of the Year (Jack Nicklaus Trophy)	(United States) Justin Thomas	
PGA Player of the Year	(United States) Justin Thomas	
Rookie of the Year	(United States) Xander Schauffele	
Scoring leader (PGA Tour – Byron Nelson Award)	(United States) Jordan Spieth	
Scoring leader (PGA – Vardon Trophy)	(United States) Jordan Spieth	
PGA Tour Courage Award	(United States) Gene Sauers	

== See also ==
- 2016 in golf
- 2017 in golf
- 2017 PGA Tour Champions season
- 2017 Web.com Tour
