= 2017 FedEx Cup Playoffs =

Tournament information
- Dates: August 24 – September 24, 2017
- Location: Glen Oaks Club; TPC Boston; Conway Farms Golf Club; East Lake Golf Club
- Tour: PGA Tour

Statistics
- Field: 125 for The Northern Trust; 100 for Dell Technologies Championship; 70 for BMW Championship; 30 for Tour Championship
- Prize fund: $35 million bonus money
- Winner's share: $10 million bonus money

Champion
- (United States) Justin Thomas
- 3,000 points

The 2017 FedEx Cup Playoffs, the series of four golf tournaments that determined the season champion on the U.S.-based PGA Tour, was played from August 24 to September 24. It included the following four events:

- The Northern Trust – Glen Oaks Club, Old Westbury, New York
- Dell Technologies Championship – TPC Boston, Norton, Massachusetts
- BMW Championship – Conway Farms Golf Club, Lake Forest, Illinois
- Tour Championship – East Lake Golf Club, Atlanta, Georgia

These were the eleventh FedEx Cup playoffs since their inception in 2007.

The point distributions can be seen here.

== Regular season rankings ==
Place	Player	Points	Events
1	(Japan) Hideki Matsuyama	2,869	18
2	(United States) Justin Thomas	2,689	21
3	(United States) Jordan Spieth	2,671	19
4	(United States) Dustin Johnson	2,466	16
5	(United States) Rickie Fowler	1,832	17
6	(Spain) Jon Rahm	1,754	19
7	(United States) Brooks Koepka	1,736	20
8	(United States) Daniel Berger	1,623	22
9	(United States) Kevin Kisner	1,612	24
10	(United States) Brian Harman	1,557	26

== The Northern Trust ==
The Northern Trust was played August 24–27. Of the 125 players eligible to play in the event, five did not enter: Sergio García (ranked 22), Brandt Snedeker (64), Adam Scott (66), Scott Piercy (85), and Dominic Bozzelli (115). Of the 120 entrants, 70 made the second-round cut at 142 (+2).

Dustin Johnson won on the first hole of a sudden-death playoff over Jordan Spieth. The top 100 players in the points standings advanced to the Dell Technologies Championship. This included three players who were outside the top 100 prior to The Northern Trust: Bubba Watson (ranked 113th to 72nd), David Lingmerth (122 to 88), and Harold Varner III (123 to 91). Three players started the tournament within the top 100 but ended the tournament outside the top 100, ending their playoff chances: An Byeong-hun (ranked 96th to 102nd), Robert Garrigus (99 to 109), and Noh Seung-yul (100 to 110).

					FedEx Cup rank	
Place	Player	Score	To par	Winnings ($)	After	Before
1	(United States) Dustin Johnson	65-69-67-66=267	−13	1,575,000	1	4
2	(United States) Jordan Spieth	69-65-64-69=267	−13	945,000	2	3
T3	(Spain) Jon Rahm	68-68-67-68=271	−9	507,500	5	6
T3	(Venezuela) Jhonattan Vegas	69-65-72-65=271	−9	507,500	10	29
5	(England) Paul Casey	69-68-66-71=274	−6	350,000	12	18
T6	(United States) Kevin Chappell	68-73-64-70=275	−5	283,281	17	30
T6	(Australia) Jason Day	69-71-68-67=275	−5	283,281	29	49
T6	(United States) Webb Simpson	73-66-71-65=275	−5	283,281	16	25
T6	(United States) Justin Thomas	68-69-69-69=275	−5	283,281	3	2
T10	(United States) Patrick Cantlay	67-70-69-70=276	−4	187,500	50	78
T10	(United States) Matt Kuchar	71-64-68-73=276	−4	187,500	15	15
T10	(South Africa) Louis Oosthuizen	67-72-68-69=276	−4	187,500	26	35
T10	(United States) Chez Reavie	69-68-69-70=276	−4	187,500	40	63
T10	(England) Justin Rose	68-68-69-71=276	−4	187,500	24	32
T10	(United States) Robert Streb	71-70-66-69=276	−4	187,500	51	79
T10	(United States) Bubba Watson	67-68-71-70=276	−4	187,500	72	113

- Par 70 course

== Dell Technologies Championship ==
The Dell Technologies Championship was played September 1–4. Of the 100 players eligible to play in the event, four did not enter: Henrik Stenson (ranked 22), Brandt Snedeker (68), J. B. Holmes (86), and Scott Piercy (94). Of the 96 entrants, 79 made the second-round cut at 145 (+3).

Justin Thomas won by three strokes over Jordan Spieth. It was Thomas's fifth win of the season and Spieth's second runner-up finish of the 2017 playoffs. The top 70 players in the points standings advanced to the BMW Championship. This included three players who were outside the top 70 prior to the Dell Technologies Championship: Stewart Cink (81 to 57), Rafa Cabrera-Bello (80 to 60), and Emiliano Grillo (77 to 62). Three players started the tournament within the top 70 but ended the tournament outside the top 70, ending their playoff chances: Russell Knox (65 to 71), Kelly Kraft (64 to 72), and Brandt Snedeker (68 to 73).

					FedEx Cup rank	
Place	Player	Score	To par	Winnings ($)	After	Before
1	(United States) Justin Thomas	71-67-63-66=267	−17	1,575,000	2	3
2	(United States) Jordan Spieth	72-65-66-67=270	−14	945,000	1	2
3	(Australia) Marc Leishman	67-69-65-70=271	−13	595,000	7	20
T4	(England) Paul Casey	70-65-67-70=272	−12	385,000	8	12
T4	(Spain) Jon Rahm	67-66-71-68=272	−12	385,000	5	5
T6	(United States) Phil Mickelson	69-67-69-68=273	−11	283,281	36	58
T6	(United States) Kevin Na	68-69-70-66=273	−11	283,281	40	63
T6	(United States) Pat Perez	72-67-67-67=273	−11	283,281	10	14
T6	(United States) Patrick Reed	71-67-69-66=273	−11	283,281	22	33
T10	(United States) Bill Haas	71-70-68-65=274	−10	227,500	30	39
T10	(England) Justin Rose	72-65-69-68=274	−10	227,500	17	24

- Par 71 course

== BMW Championship ==
The BMW Championship was played September 14–17, after a one-week break. All 70 players eligible to play in the event did so, and there was no cut.

Marc Leishman won by five strokes from Rickie Fowler and Justin Rose. The top 30 players in the points standings advanced to the Tour Championship. This included four players who were outside the top 30 prior to the BMW Championship: Tony Finau (39 to 24), Sergio García (34 to 25), Xander Schauffele (32 to 26), and Patrick Cantlay (41 to 29). Four players started the tournament within the top 30 but ended the tournament outside the top 30, ending their playoff chances: Louis Oosthuizen (24 to 31), Henrik Stenson (26 to 32), Brendan Steele (27 to 33), and Bill Haas (30 to 35).

					FedEx Cup rank	
Place	Player	Score	To par	Winnings ($)	After	Before
1	(Australia) Marc Leishman	62-64-68-67=261	−23	1,575,000	4	7
T2	(United States) Rickie Fowler	65-64-70-67=266	−18	770,000	6	6
T2	(England) Justin Rose	67-68-66-65=266	−18	770,000	8	17
4	(Australia) Jason Day	64-65-70-69=268	−16	420,000	15	28
T5	(United States) Matt Kuchar	67-68-67-67=269	−15	332,500	12	18
T5	(Spain) Jon Rahm	69-68-65-67=269	−15	332,500	5	5
T7	(United States) Tony Finau	65-72-70-64=271	−13	282,188	24	39
T7	(United States) Jordan Spieth	65-70-71-65=271	−13	282,188	1	1
T9	(United States) Patrick Cantlay	67-65-70-70=272	−12	236,250	29	41
T9	(India) Anirban Lahiri	67-71-68-66=272	−12	236,250	51	70
T9	(United States) Webb Simpson	66-73-65-68=272	−12	236,250	16	21

- Par 71 course

== Reseed points ==
The points were reset after the BMW Championship.

Place	Player	Points	Reseed points	Events
1	(United States) Jordan Spieth	5,421	2,000	22
2	(United States) Justin Thomas	5,081	1,800	24
3	(United States) Dustin Johnson	4,730	1,520	19
4	(Australia) Marc Leishman	4,084	1,296	24
5	(Spain) Jon Rahm	3,314	1,280	22
6	(United States) Rickie Fowler	3,197	1,120	20
7	(Japan) Hideki Matsuyama	3,058	960	21
8	(England) Justin Rose	2,514	800	17
9	(United States) Brooks Koepka	2,170	640	23
10	(England) Paul Casey	2,145	480	23

== Tour Championship ==
The Tour Championship was played September 21–24. All 30 golfers who qualified for the tournament played, and there was no cut. Xander Schauffele won by one stroke over Justin Thomas but Thomas won the FedEx Cup.

					FedEx Cup rank	
Place	Player	Score	To par	Winnings ($)	After	Before
1	(United States) Xander Schauffele	69-66-65-68=268	−12	1,575,000	3	26
2	(United States) Justin Thomas	67-66-70-66=269	−11	945,000	1	2
T3	(United States) Russell Henley	67-71-67-65=270	−10	511,875	13	27
T3	(United States) Kevin Kisner	68-68-64-70=270	−10	511,875	12	18
5	(England) Paul Casey	66-67-65-73=271	−9	350,000	11	10
6	(United States) Brooks Koepka	66-69-68-69=272	−8	315,000	10	9
T7	(United States) Tony Finau	68-71-68-66=273	−7	280,000	19	24
T7	(Spain) Jon Rahm	67-67-70-69=273	−7	280,000	5	5
T7	(United States) Jordan Spieth	67-70-69-67=273	−7	280,000	2	1
T10	(Spain) Sergio García	73-66-68-67=274	−6	236,250	21	25
T10	(United States) Matt Kuchar	69-71-67-67=274	−6	236,250	14	12
T10	(England) Justin Rose	68-66-71-69=274	−6	236,250	9	8

- Par 70 course

== Final leaderboard ==
Place	Player	Points	Money ($)
1	(United States) Justin Thomas	3,000	10,000,000
2	(United States) Jordan Spieth	2,340	3,000,000
3	(United States) Xander Schauffele	2,151	2,000,000
4	(United States) Dustin Johnson	1,720	1,500,000
5	(Spain) Jon Rahm	1,620	1,000,000
6	(Australia) Marc Leishman	1,441	800,000
7	(United States) Rickie Fowler	1,253	700,000
8	(Japan) Hideki Matsuyama	1,093	600,000
9	(England) Justin Rose	1,080	550,000
10	(United States) Brooks Koepka	1,040	500,000

For the full list, see here.

== Table of qualifying players ==
Table key:

Win
Top-10 finish
Did not advance to next tournament
Played way into next tournament

	Player	Pre-Playoffs		The Northern Trust		Dell Technologies		BMW Champ.		Reseed points	Tour Champ.	
	Player	Points	Rank	Finish	Rank after	Finish	Rank after	Finish	Rank after	Reseed points	Finish	Final rank
(Japan)	Hideki Matsuyama	2,869	1	CUT	4	T23	4	T47	7	960	T26	8
(United States)	Justin Thomas	2,689	2	T6	3	1	2	T47	2	1,800	2	1
(United States)	Jordan Spieth	2,671	3	2	2	2	1	T7	1	2,000	T7	2
(United States)	Dustin Johnson	2,466	4	1	1	T18	3	T33	3	1,520	T17	4
(United States)	Rickie Fowler	1,832	5	T20	6	T13	6	T2	6	1,120	T26	7
(Spain)	Jon Rahm*	1,754	6	T3	5	T4	5	T5	5	1,280	T7	5
(United States)	Brooks Koepka	1,736	7	T49	7	T18	9	T12	9	640	6	10
(United States)	Daniel Berger	1,623	8	33	8	T61	11	T33	14	336	15	16
(United States)	Kevin Kisner	1,612	9	T54	11	T53	14	T67	18	251	T3	12
(United States)	Brian Harman	1,557	10	CUT	13	T65	15	T40	20	219	T24	25
(United States)	Charley Hoffman	1,498	11	T17	9	T47	12	T27	13	352	T28	20
(United States)	Pat Perez	1,461	12	T34	14	T6	10	T12	11	384	16	15
(Canada)	Adam Hadwin	1,347	13	CUT	18	T13	16	T40	21	206	23	26
(Australia)	Marc Leishman	1,324	14	CUT	20	3	7	1	4	1,296	T24	6
(United States)	Matt Kuchar	1,260	15	T10	15	T56	18	T5	12	368	T10	14
(United States)	Brendan Steele	1,226	16	CUT	25	T56	27	T44	33	–	–	33
(United States)	Kyle Stanley	1,204	17	T25	19	T25	19	T47	22	194	T20	24
(England)	Paul Casey	1,135	18	5	12	T4	8	T33	10	480	5	11
(United States)	Russell Henley	1,129	19	T25	23	T40	23	T47	27	142	T3	13
(United States)	Jason Dufner	1,126	20	T20	21	T69	25	T58	30	115	T20	30
(United States)	Charles Howell III	1,102	21	T62	28	CUT	35	T67	40	–	–	40
(Spain)	Sergio García	1,085	22	DNP	30	T35	34	T12	25	161	T10	21
(Sweden)	Henrik Stenson	1,079	23	T17	22	DNP	26	T51	32	–	–	32
(United States)	Billy Horschel	1,068	24	CUT	31	CUT	38	62	42	–	–	42
(United States)	Webb Simpson	1,058	25	T6	16	T75	21	T9	16	293	T13	17
(United States)	Gary Woodland	1,052	26	CUT	34	T18	29	T27	28	133	19	28
(United States)	Wesley Bryan*	1,046	27	T54	32	T69	37	69	41	–	–	41
(United States)	Tony Finau	1,024	28	T54	35	T65	39	T7	24	170	T7	19
(Venezuela)	Jhonattan Vegas	1,023	29	T3	10	T65	13	T63	17	272	30	23
(United States)	Kevin Chappell	1,015	30	T6	17	T35	20	T12	19	231	T28	27
(Italy)	Francesco Molinari	1,010	31	CUT	36	T61	42	T12	37	–	–	37
(England)	Justin Rose	996	32	T10	24	T10	17	T2	8	800	T10	9
(United States)	Xander Schauffele*	988	33	T17	27	T53	32	T20	26	151	1	3
(Canada)	Mackenzie Hughes*	974	34	T62	37	T13	31	T44	36	–	–	36
(South Africa)	Louis Oosthuizen	956	35	T10	26	T30	24	T63	31	–	–	31
(United States)	Bill Haas	946	36	CUT	39	T10	30	T53	35	–	–	35
(United States)	Hudson Swafford	921	37	T43	38	T13	33	T40	38	–	–	38
(United States)	Patrick Reed	896	38	T20	33	T6	22	65	23	182	T13	22
(United States)	Ollie Schniederjans*	882	39	CUT	42	CUT	50	66	60	–	–	60
(Australia)	Cameron Smith*	847	40	CUT	44	CUT	56	T12	46	–	–	46
(South Korea)	Kim Si-woo	839	41	T43	41	T40	45	T58	54	–	–	54
(United States)	Zach Johnson	839	42	CUT	46	T56	54	T20	48	–	–	48
(United States)	Bryson DeChambeau*	836	43	CUT	48	T30	44	T33	49	–	–	49
(Northern Ireland)	Rory McIlroy	803	44	T34	43	CUT	51	T58	58	–	–	58
(South Korea)	Kang Sung-hoon	798	45	CUT	53	T35	52	T53	59	–	–	59
(United States)	Keegan Bradley	794	46	T43	47	T35	48	T27	47	–	–	47
(United States)	Jamie Lovemark	787	47	CUT	54	T40	58	T33	57	–	–	57
(England)	Ian Poulter	760	48	66	56	T23	47	T40	52	–	–	52
(Australia)	Jason Day	756	49	T6	29	T25	28	4	15	314	T17	18
(United States)	Luke List	741	50	T34	52	T47	55	T20	50	–	–	50
(United States)	Phil Mickelson	734	51	T54	58	T6	36	T20	34	–	–	34
(South Africa)	Charl Schwartzel	727	52	T29	49	T25	43	T27	44	–	–	44
(United States)	James Hahn	711	53	CUT	60	T75	64	T33	68	–	–	68
(United States)	Sean O'Hair	707	54	69	59	CUT	65	T20	62	–	–	62
(United States)	Lucas Glover	706	55	T40	57	T30	53	T12	43	–	–	43
(New Zealand)	Danny Lee	697	56	CUT	62	CUT	69	WD	70	–	–	70
(Scotland)	Martin Laird	676	57	T20	45	T40	49	T44	56	–	–	56
(United States)	Kelly Kraft*	672	58	70	64	WD	72	–	–	–	–	72
(United States)	Ryan Moore	671	59	T49	61	WD	67	T20	64	–	–	64
(Scotland)	Russell Knox	669	60	CUT	65	T61	71	–	–	–	–	71
(India)	Anirban Lahiri	667	61	CUT	66	T56	70	T9	51	–	–	51
(United States)	Bud Cauley	666	62	CUT	67	T47	68	T27	65	–	–	65
(United States)	Chez Reavie	666	63	T10	40	T61	46	T12	39	–	–	39
(United States)	Brandt Snedeker	663	64	DNP	68	DNP	73	–	–	–	–	73
(United States)	Scott Brown	646	65	T25	55	T65	61	T20	55	–	–	55
(Australia)	Adam Scott	642	66	DNP	73	CUT	79	–	–	–	–	79
(Canada)	Graham DeLaet	640	67	WD	74	T75	76	–	–	–	–	76
(United States)	Patrick Rodgers	639	68	CUT	75	T73	78	–	–	–	–	78
(United States)	Grayson Murray*	638	69	T62	70	T25	63	T51	66	–	–	66
(Australia)	Rod Pampling	630	70	T54	71	79	74	–	–	–	–	74
(United States)	Chris Stroud	627	71	CUT	78	CUT	84	–	–	–	–	84
(United States)	Kevin Tway*	619	72	T43	69	T40	66	T53	69	–	–	69
(United States)	Chad Campbell	616	73	T67	76	CUT	83	–	–	–	–	83
(Spain)	Rafa Cabrera-Bello*	615	74	CUT	80	T18	60	T33	61	–	–	61
(United States)	Kevin Na	584	75	T29	63	T6	40	T53	45	–	–	45
(United States)	Stewart Cink	583	76	CUT	81	12	57	T27	53	–	–	53
(Sweden)	Jonas Blixt	578	77	CUT	84	T40	82	–	–	–	–	82
(United States)	Patrick Cantlay*	578	78	T10	50	T13	41	T9	29	124	T20	29
(United States)	Robert Streb	577	79	T10	51	T73	59	T53	63	–	–	63
(United States)	Morgan Hoffmann	565	80	T67	83	T40	81	–	–	–	–	81
(United States)	Jim Herman	553	81	CUT	86	T69	91	–	–	–	–	91
(United States)	J. B. Holmes	543	82	CUT	88	DNP	95	–	–	–	–	95
(United States)	Kevin Streelman	541	83	CUT	90	T35	86	–	–	–	–	86
(Canada)	Nick Taylor	532	84	CUT	92	T56	93	–	–	–	–	93
(United States)	Scott Piercy	532	85	DNP	94	DNP	98	–	–	–	–	98
(Taiwan)	Pan Cheng-tsung*	527	86	T49	85	T47	88	–	–	–	–	88
(United States)	Patton Kizzire	519	87	CUT	97	CUT	99	–	–	–	–	99
(Argentina)	Emiliano Grillo	518	88	T29	77	22	62	T58	67	–	–	67
(United States)	Cody Gribble*	514	89	CUT	98	T30	87	–	–	–	–	87
(South Africa)	Branden Grace	510	90	CUT	99	T25	80	–	–	–	–	80
(United States)	J. J. Spaun*	510	91	T54	93	T75	97	–	–	–	–	97
(South Korea)	Kim Meen-whee*	505	92	T34	82	CUT	89	–	–	–	–	89
(United States)	William McGirt	499	93	T54	96	T30	85	–	–	–	–	85
(United States)	Jason Kokrak	490	94	T25	79	T53	77	–	–	–	–	77
(United States)	Michael Kim	483	95	CUT	100	CUT	100	–	–	–	–	100
(South Korea)	An Byeong-hun*	468	96	CUT	102	–	–	–	–	–	–	102
(United States)	Chris Kirk	467	97	T40	95	T47	92	–	–	–	–	92
(Colombia)	Camilo Villegas	464	98	T34	89	CUT	96	–	–	–	–	96
(United States)	Robert Garrigus	448	99	CUT	109	–	–	–	–	–	–	109
(South Korea)	Noh Seung-yul	446	100	CUT	110	–	–	–	–	–	–	110
(United States)	Jimmy Walker	439	101	CUT	111	–	–	–	–	–	–	111
(United States)	Scott Stallings	438	102	T43	101	–	–	–	–	–	–	101
(Sweden)	David Lingmerth	437	103	T29	87	CUT	94	–	–	–	–	94
(United States)	D. A. Points	435	104	T54	104	–	–	–	–	–	–	104
(United States)	Ryan Blaum*	434	105	T62	107	–	–	–	–	–	–	107
(United States)	Brian Gay	426	106	CUT	112	–	–	–	–	–	–	112
(England)	Luke Donald	424	107	T49	105	–	–	–	–	–	–	105
(United States)	Richy Werenski*	423	108	T49	106	–	–	–	–	–	–	106
(United States)	Brandon Hagy*	419	109	CUT	113	–	–	–	–	–	–	113
(United States)	Steve Stricker	410	110	CUT	115	–	–	–	–	–	–	115
(United States)	Derek Fathauer	408	111	CUT	116	–	–	–	–	–	–	116
(South Africa)	Tyrone van Aswegen	407	112	CUT	117	–	–	–	–	–	–	117
(United States)	Bubba Watson	397	113	T10	72	T69	75	–	–	–	–	75
(United States)	Harris English	397	114	CUT	118	–	–	–	–	–	–	118
(United States)	Dominic Bozzelli*	394	115	DNP	119	–	–	–	–	–	–	119
(Australia)	Geoff Ogilvy	390	116	T40	108	–	–	–	–	–	–	108
(United States)	Nick Watney	386	117	CUT	120	–	–	–	–	–	–	120
(United States)	Martin Flores	383	118	T34	103	–	–	–	–	–	–	103
(United States)	John Huh	382	119	CUT	121	–	–	–	–	–	–	121
(United States)	Blayne Barber	381	120	CUT	122	–	–	–	–	–	–	122
(United States)	Ben Martin	378	121	CUT	123	–	–	–	–	–	–	123
(South Africa)	Rory Sabbatini	375	122	CUT	124	–	–	–	–	–	–	124
(United States)	Harold Varner III	375	123	T20	91	T47	90	–	–	–	–	90
(United States)	Vaughn Taylor	369	124	T43	114	–	–	–	–	–	–	114
(United States)	J. J. Henry	365	125	CUT	125	–	–	–	–	–	–	125

* First-time Playoffs qualifier
