= Alabama Crimson Tide golf =

- University: University of Alabama
- Conference: SEC
- Head coach: Men's: Jay Seawell (22nd season); Women's: Mic Potter (20th season)
- Location: Tuscaloosa, Alabama
- Course: Ol' Colony Golf Complex; Par: 72; Yards: 7,544
- Nickname: Alabama Crimson Tide
- Colors: Crimson and white

NCAA champions
- Men: 2013, 2014; Women: 2012

NCAA individual champions
- Women: Eleanor Dudley (1941), Emma Talley (2015)

NCAA match play
- Men: 2012, 2013, 2014, 2018; Women: 2018

NCAA Championship appearances
- Men: 1973, 1974, 1975, 1981, 1983, 1991, 1992, 1993, 1994, 1996, 1997, 2002, 2003, 2005, 2006, 2007, 2008, 2009, 2010, 2011, 2012, 2013, 2014, 2016, 2017, 2018, 2023, 2024, 2025, 2026; Women: 1987, 1993, 1994, 1997, 1998, 1999, 2002, 2004, 2006, 2007, 2008, 2009, 2010, 2011, 2012, 2013, 2014, 2015, 2016, 2017, 2018, 2021, 2022, 2023

Conference champions
- Men: 1979, 2008, 2012, 2013, 2014; Women: 2010, 2013, 2016

Individual conference champions
- Men: Bobby Hill (1952), Michael Thompson (2008), Justin Thomas (2012), Bobby Wyatt (2014); Women: Stephanie Meadow (2013)

The Alabama Crimson Tide golf teams represent the University of Alabama located in Tuscaloosa, Alabama, and compete in National Collegiate Athletic Association (NCAA) Division I and the Southeastern Conference (SEC). The Crimson Tide currently has two of the best teams in the country with the men and women consistently ranked inside the top 5 by Golfweek.

== History ==
=== Men ===
The Alabama Crimson Tide men's golf program has a rich history that dates back to the program's inception in 1952. That first season saw Crimson Tide golfer Bobby Hill capture the SEC Individual Championship. Michael Thompson (2008), Justin Thomas (2012), and Bobby Wyatt are the only other Crimson Tide golfers to win the SEC Individual Championship. The Crimson Tide have won five SEC Tournament Championships (1979, 2008, 2012–2014); appeared in 27 NCAA Tournaments and advanced to the finals 12 times; and have had 13 players garner 21 All-America honors.

Jay Seawell, the 2008 & 2012 SEC Coach of the Year, arrived in 2002 and has steadily taken the Tide to some of its greatest heights in program history. Entering his 21st year at the Capstone, Seawell has established Alabama as one of the elite programs in collegiate golf. The Tide has been routinely ranked in the top 15 in the country while leading Alabama to 15 NCAA Tournaments appearances and four berths in the NCAA Championships. Under Seawell's guidance in 2008, Alabama captured its first SEC Championship since 1979 and its first SEC medalist – Michael Thompson – since Bobby Hill in 1952. Over the past eight years, the Crimson Tide has garnered seven All-America honors by five players, had eight All-Region selections and 15 All-SEC honors, including 9 first-team choices. Bud Cauley, an All-American his three years at Alabama (2009–2011), was named the SEC Freshman of the Year in 2009 and was a finalist for the Ben Hogan Award. Thompson was also a finalist in 2008. In 2011, Cory Whitsett was named SEC Freshman of the Year and First-Team All-SEC. The 2012 team made it to the final match at the NCAA Championships before losing on the final hole and finishing second. Freshman Justin Thomas was also named the SEC Freshman of the Year and the SEC Player of the Year for the 2012 season. In 2013 the team repeated as SEC Champions and for the second straight season made it to the final match at the NCAA Championships, where they defeated Illinois 4-1 to win the program's first NCAA National Championship. In 2014 the Tide once again won the SEC Championship, with Bobby Wyatt becoming just the fourth Crimson Tide golfer to win a SEC Individual Championship. The Tide would go on compete in their third consecutive NCAA finals match and repeated as NCAA national champions by defeating Oklahoma State 4–1.

=== Women ===
Alabama first had a women's golf team in 1974, but has reached heights of success over the past five years never seen in the program's history. Since his arrival in 2006, Mic Potter has built Alabama into a national contender. The Tide has advanced to the NCAA Championships in each of Potter's eight seasons after the Tide had qualified for the NCAA Women's Golf Championship just once in the program's history before his arrival. In 2010, Alabama won the SEC Women's Golf Championship and posted a then school-best third-place finish at the NCAA Championships. In 2011, the Crimson Tide won its first NCAA Regional title in school history, and qualified for the 2011 NCAA Golf Championship at the Traditions Club in Bryan, Texas, where they finished tied for 8th.

In 2012, the Tide won their first-ever NCAA Championship, when senior Brooke Pancake made a par on the final hole to clinch the title, winning with a score of 1,171 strokes (19-over-par) over four rounds at the Vanderbilt Legends Course in Franklin, Tennessee. The championship was the first for the University of Alabama in a sport other than football or gymnastics. The Crimson Tide continued their success in 2013 where they won the SEC Championship as a team while Stephanie Meadow won the individual title.

In 1941, Eleanor Dudley won the women's individual intercollegiate golf championship (an event conducted by the Division of Girls' and Women's Sports (DGWS) — which later evolved into the current NCAA women's golf championship). In 2015, Emma Talley won the NCAA Individual Championship.

== Tour professionals ==
=== Men ===
The Crimson Tide has had numerous great players that have come through the program over the years. One of the best known is Jerry Pate, who has competed in the Walker Cup, garnered All-American honors, captured the U.S. Amateur, won the U.S. Open, was named PGA Rookie of the Year, and went on to enjoy a successful career on the PGA Tour and the Champions Tour. Pate also designed Alabama's current home course, Ol' Colony. Another successful alum is 2017 PGA Championship winner, 2017 FedEx Cup Champion, 2021 Players Championship winner, and 2022 PGA Championship winner Justin Thomas. As of June 2026, Thomas has won 16 times on the PGA Tour. Besides his 2 Major Championships, FedEx Cup, and Players Championship, other highlights include the 2018 WGC-Bridgestone Invitational, the Dell Technologies Championship (a FedEx Cup playoff event), and the 2020 WGC-FedEx St. Jude Invitational.

Other players that played with the Tide include Trey Mullinax, Steve Lowery, Bud Cauley, Spike McRoy, Jason Bohn, Dicky Pride, David Kirkpatrick, Mårten Olander, Michael Thompson, Davis Riley, and Lee Hodges. Olander captured the 1993 Ben Hogan Award. Besides Jerry Pate, the only other Alabama Crimson Tide golfer thought to earn first team All-America honors is David Kirkpatrick.

=== Women ===
Cheyenne Knight has the lone victory for former Tide players on the LPGA Tour. Other LPGA Tour players include Kathleen Ekey, Sofia Grönberg-Whitmore (who won three times on the Ladies European Tour), Camilla Lennarth (one LET win), Stephanie Meadow, Brooke Pancake, Leslie Spalding, Jeon Ji-won, and Emma Talley. The Tide has some success on the LPGA developmental Epson Tour, with 13 all-time members and four total wins.

== Ol' Colony Golf Complex ==
The Crimson Tide golf team's home course is Ol' Colony, located in Tuscaloosa, Alabama. The course, which opened in 2000, was designed by former Crimson Tide golfer Jerry Pate. The course is a 7,544-yard par 72, which includes the state-of-the-art Jerry Pate Practice Center dedicated to the Crimson Tide golf teams.
