= Kiva Dunes =

Coordinates: 30°14′10″N 87°53′40″W

Kiva Dunes is a public golf course located in Baldwin County, just west of Gulf Shores, Alabama. The course was designed by professional golfer Jerry Pate with developer Jim Edgemon, and was immediately ranked #2 in Golf Digest's Best New Public Course (US) when it opened in 1995. More recently, the publication ranked the course #58 on America's 100 Greatest Public Courses. GolfLink currently lists Kiva Dunes as one of the best golf course in the state and it is ranked #44 in Golf Week's Top 100 Resort Courses and #76 in their Top 100 Residential Courses.

Kiva Dunes is situated on a 276-acre property that encompasses beachfront on the Gulf of Mexico and Mobile Bay. The resort was established in 1992 by Jim Edgemon and Larry Drummond, who purchased 276 acres on the Ft. Morgan peninsula, which included 3,000 feet of beachfront on the Gulf of Mexico and 2,800 feet on Mobile Bay.

== History ==
The Kiva Dunes resort and golf course trace their origins to the early 1990s, when developer Jim “Scrappy” Edgemon relocated to Baldwin County, Alabama, and began seeking a property suitable for a seaside golf-oriented community. After a period of site-searching, Edgemon and business partner Larry Drummond purchased approximately 276 acres on the Fort Morgan peninsula in 1992, including about 3,000 feet of Gulf of Mexico beachfront and approximately 2,800 feet on Mobile Bay.

A pivotal connection in the story is the involvement of Jerry Pate, the former U.S. Open champion turned golf-course designer. According to the Kiva Dunes website, Edgemon and Pate first crossed paths during their days at the University of Alabama golf course. Years later, when the course design was to be commissioned, Edgemon elected to hire Pate .

The new course opened to the public in 1995. From its opening, the facility was recognized for its bold links-style layout and quickly earned high rankings among public courses in the United States.

Over the ensuing years, Kiva Dunes expanded beyond the golf course to become a full resort community — incorporating vacation homes, condominiums, beach-club amenities, pools, tennis courts and other on-site facilities. The combination of natural beauty, golf pedigree (via Pate), and strategic development (via Edgemon & Drummond) has helped Kiva Dunes become a distinctive destination on Alabama's Gulf Coast.

== Awards and recognition ==
Since its opening in 1995, Kiva Dunes has received numerous state and national honors for both its golf course design and resort amenities.

- 1995 – Voted Alabama’s Best Place to Play by Golf Digest.
- 1995 – Ranked #2 Best New Public Course in the United States by Golf Digest.
- 1996 – Listed among Golf Magazine’s Top 10 You Can Play.
- 1996 – Ranked #24 in America's Top 75 Upscale Courses by Golf Digest.
- 2000 – Featured in Links Magazine as a Modern Classics Course.
- 2002 – Ranked #68 in America's Top 75 Golf Resorts by Golf Digest.
- 2003 – Ranked #58 in America's Top 100 Public Courses by Golf Digest.
- 2012 – Ranked #86 in GolfWeek’s Best Courses You Can Play (listed nationally).
- 2013 – Ranked #2 in GolfWeek’s Best Courses You Can Play (State-by-State) for Alabama.
- 2014 – Maintained #2 position in GolfWeek’s Best Courses You Can Play (State-by-State) for Alabama.
- 2015 – Named among GolfWeek’s Best Courses You Can Play nationally.
- 2017 – Ranked #38 in GolfAdvisor’s Best of 2017 Top 50 Golf Courses.
- 2018 – Ranked #5 in The Best Golf Courses in Alabama by Golf Digest.
- 2018 – Ranked #1 Public Golf Course in Alabama by Golf Advisor.
- 2019 – Retained #1 Public Golf Course in Alabama ranking by Golf Advisor.
- 2021 – Rated #48 on NBC's Golfer’s Choice list by Golf Pass.
- 2021–2022 – Named Alabama’s Leading Resort by the World Travel Awards.
- 2024 – Voted Best Vacation Destination by Alabama Magazine’s Best of Bama Awards.
- 2025 – Repeated as Best Vacation Destination for the third consecutive year in the Best of Bama Awards.

---

- The resort has appeared frequently in national and regional publications such as Golf Digest, GolfWeek, and Links Magazine, and continues to rank among Alabama's highest-rated public courses.
- The list above summarizes recognitions cited in company archives and major golf media.
