= Hideki Matsuyama =

Japanese professional golfer (born 1992)

Hideki Matsuyama 松山 英樹
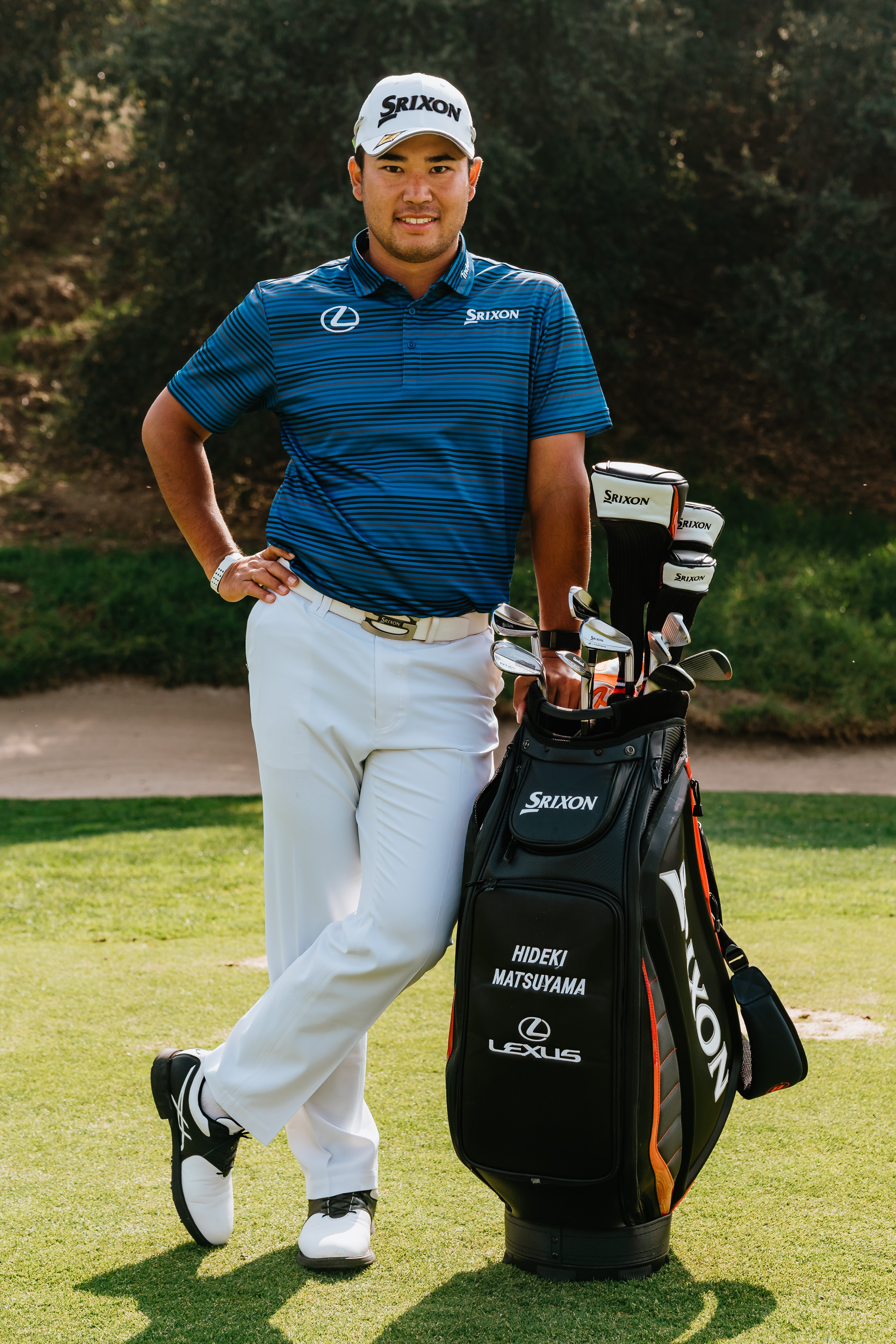
- Matsuyama in 2021

Personal information
- Nationality: Japan
- Born: 25 February 1992 (age 34) Matsuyama, Ehime, Japan
- Height: 1.80 m (5 ft 11 in)
- Weight: 90 kg (198 lb)
- Spouse: Mei Matsuyama (m. 2017)
- Children: 1

Career
- Sport: Golf
- College: Tohoku Fukushi University
- Turned professional: 2013
- Current tour: PGA Tour
- Former tour: Japan Golf Tour
- Professional wins: 21
- Highest ranking: 2 (18 June 2017) (as of 8 November 2026)

Number of wins by tour
- PGA Tour: 11
- European Tour: 3
- Japan Golf Tour: 8
- Other: 2

Best results in major championships (wins: 1)
- Masters Tournament: Won: 2021
- PGA Championship: T4: 2016
- U.S. Open: T2: 2017
- The Open Championship: T6: 2013

Achievements and awards
- Japan Golf Tour money list winner: 2013
- Japan Golf Tour Most Valuable Player: 2013
- Japan Golf Tour Rookie of the Year: 2013
Medal record
Men's golf
Representing Japan
Olympic Games
Bronze medal – third place	2024 Paris	Individual
Summer Universiade
Gold medal – first place	2011 Shenzhen	Individual
Gold medal – first place	2011 Shenzhen	Men's team

Hideki Matsuyama (Japanese: 松山 英樹, romanized: Matsuyama Hideki; IPA: [ma̠t͡sɨja̠ma̠ çide̞kʲi]; born 25 February 1992) is a Japanese professional golfer who plays on the PGA Tour. He is the first Japanese golfer to win a men's major golf championship – the 2021 Masters Tournament.

As of January 2025, Matsuyama has 20 worldwide wins, an Olympic bronze medal, ten career top-10 finishes in major championships, and six Presidents Cup appearances. Matsuyama is a two-time winner of tournaments in the World Golf Championships, two-time winner of the Waste Management Phoenix Open, eight-time Japan Golf Tour winner, two-time winner of the Asian Amateur Championship, and most recently winner of the FedEx St. Jude Championship. His 11 wins on the PGA Tour make him the most successful Japanese member of the PGA Tour in history.

Matsuyama was ranked first in the World Amateur Golf Ranking in 2012. As a professional, he has been ranked as high as second in the Official World Golf Ranking, doing so in June 2017.

== Early life and amateur career ==
Matsuyama was born on 25 February 1992 in Matsuyama, Ehime, Japan. He was introduced to golf at the age of four by his father. During eighth grade, he transferred to Meitoku Gijuku Junior & Senior High School in Kochi Prefecture, in search of a better golf environment.

Matsuyama studied at Tohoku Fukushi University in Sendai. He won the 2010 Asian Amateur Championship with a score of 68-69-65-67=269. This gave him the chance to compete as an amateur in the 2011 Masters Tournament, becoming the first Japanese amateur to do so. At the Masters, Matsuyama was the leading amateur and won the Silver Cup, which is presented to the lowest scoring amateur. He was the only amateur to make the cut. A week after his victory, he finished in a tie for third at the Japan Open Golf Championship, which is an event on the Japan Golf Tour.

In 2011, Matsuyama won the gold medal at the 2011 World University Games. He also led the Japan team to the gold medal in the team event. In October 2011, he also successfully defended his title at the Asian Amateur Championship. In November, Matsuyama won the Mitsui Sumitomo Visa Taiheiyo Masters on the Japan Golf Tour while still an amateur.

In August 2012, Matsuyama reached number one in the World Amateur Golf Ranking.

== Professional career ==
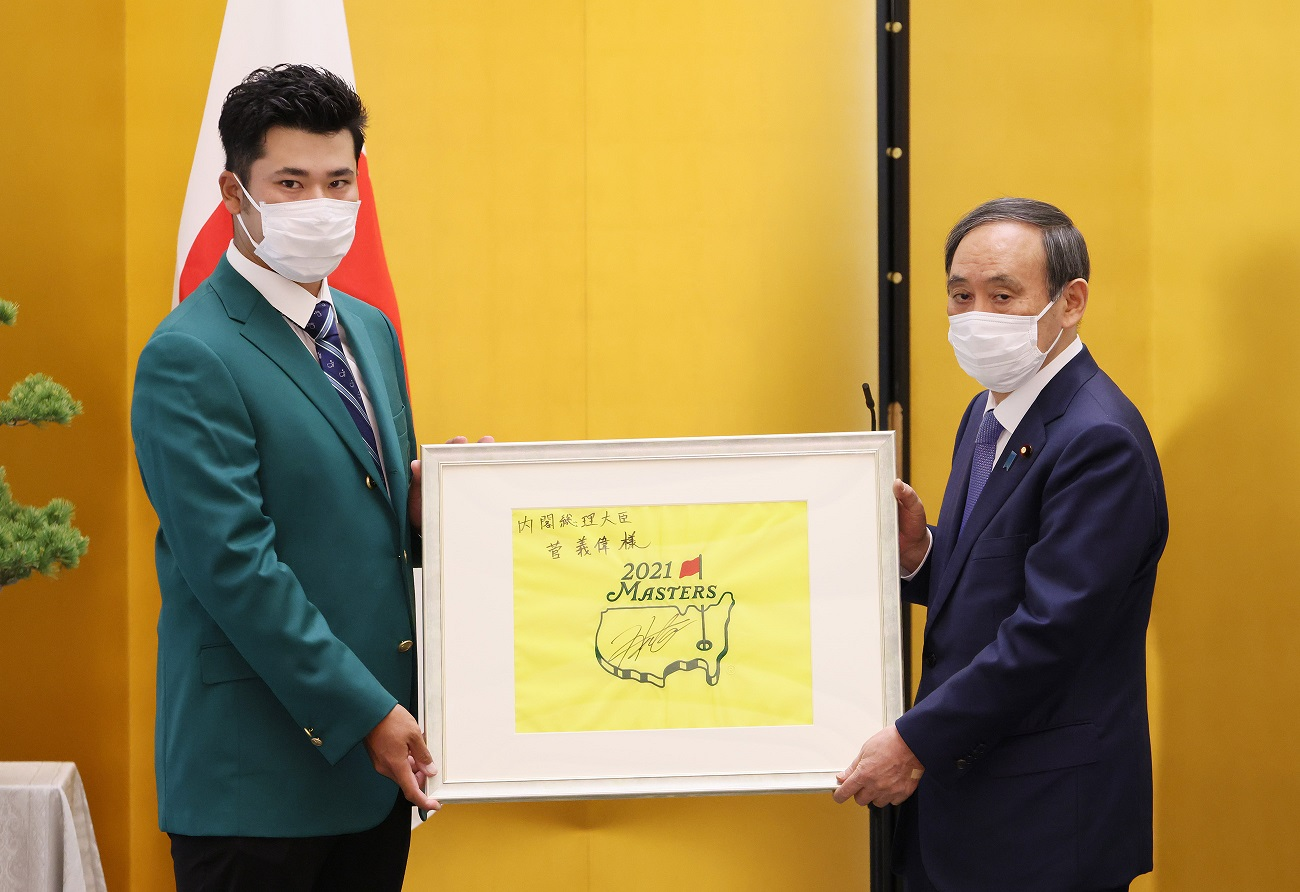
Yoshihide Suga held a ceremony at Naikaku Sōri Daijin Kantei to honor Matsuyama in 2021.

=== Japan Golf Tour ===
Matsuyama turned professional in April 2013 and won his second professional tournament, the 2013 Tsuruya Open on the Japan Golf Tour. Five weeks later, Matsuyama won his third title on the Japan Golf Tour at the Diamond Cup Golf tournament. Following a top 10 finish at the 2013 U.S. Open, Matsuyama entered the top 50 of the Official World Golf Ranking. He won his fourth Japan Golf Tour event in September at the Fujisankei Classic. Matsuyama would win his fifth Japan Golf Tour event in December at the Casio World Open. The win also made Matsuyama the first rookie to lead the Japan Tour's money list.

=== PGA Tour ===
For 2014, Matsuyama qualified for the PGA Tour through non-member earnings. In just seven PGA Tour-sanctioned events, Matsuyama had six top-25 finishes, including a T-6 at the 2013 Open Championship.

Matsuyama earned his first PGA Tour win at the 2014 Memorial Tournament, beating Kevin Na in a playoff and moving to a career-high OWGR ranking of 13th. The win was the first for a Japanese player since Ryuji Imada in 2008. In his first full season as a PGA tour member, he finished 28th in the FedEx Cup standings.

Matsuyama would win his sixth Japan Golf Tour event late in the 2014 season. In November, the victory came at the Dunlop Phoenix in a playoff over Hiroshi Iwata.

Matsuyama finished fifth at the 2015 Masters Tournament, the best major finish of his career to that point. He finished 16th in the FedEx Cup standings. In 8–11 October, he played for the International Team in the 2015 Presidents Cup and went 2–1–1 (win–loss–half).

On 7 February 2016, Matsuyama won the Waste Management Phoenix Open in a playoff with Rickie Fowler. He secured his victory on the fourth hole. The win moved him to 12th in the Official World Golf Ranking, the highest in his career.

On 16 October 2016, Matsuyama captured the Japan Open by three strokes over Yuta Ikeda and Lee Kyoung-hoon. The win was Matsuyama's first title at his country's national open and his seventh victory in Japan. The title gives Matsuyama victories in four of the Japan Golf Tour's five ¥200,000,000 events.

On 30 October 2016, Matsuyama followed up his Japan Open triumph by winning the WGC-HSBC Champions, colloquially known as "Asia's Major", in Shanghai. Matsuyama became the first Asian golfer to claim a World Golf Championship since the series was inaugurated in 1999. With the victory, Matsuyama rose to number 6 in the Official World Golf Ranking, his highest position and the second highest ever by a Japanese player after Masashi Ozaki, who achieved a ranking of fifth. He later moved up to fifth in the world after the Farmers Insurance Open. On 13 November 2016, Matsuyama won his second Taiheiyo Masters, following his victory as a 19-year-old amateur in 2011. He romped to a seven-shot win over South Korea's Song Young-han. On 4 December 2016, Matsuyama won the Hero World Challenge in the Bahamas.

Although he was the highest ranked male Japanese golfer at the time, Matsuyama withdrew from participating in the 2016 Rio Olympic Games out of concern about the 2016 Zika virus epidemic, which caused several of the world's top players to withdraw from the Olympic golf event.

In Matsuyama's return to the Waste Management Phoenix Open, he again entered a playoff on Sunday to defend his title, this time against Webb Simpson. On the fourth playoff hole, Matsuyama made birdie to win the tournament for the second time in as many years. After finishing second in the 2017 U.S. Open at Erin Hills, while the top three players in the world at the time (Dustin Johnson, Rory McIlroy and Jason Day) failed to make the cut, Matsuyama reached 2nd in the Official World Golf Ranking, his highest ever, and the highest ever for a male Japanese golfer.

The 2017 season has been a breakthrough year with Matsuyama winning three Tour titles, including his first World Golf Championship, and three second-place finishes in his first 15 events, as well as winning $5,945,990, putting him second on the money list behind Dustin Johnson, before the month of July. He then won the WGC-Bridgestone Invitational in August, shooting a course record-tying 61 in the final round to win by five strokes.

At the 2017 PGA Championship, Matsuyama had opening rounds of 70–64 to share the 36-hold lead, with Kevin Kisner at Quail Hollow.

In December 2019, Matsuyama played on the International team at the 2019 Presidents Cup at Royal Melbourne Golf Club in Australia. The U.S. team won, 16–14. Matsuyama went 2–1–1 and halved his Sunday singles match against Tony Finau.

On 11 April 2021, Matsuyama won the Masters Tournament, becoming both the first Japanese player and the first Asian-born player to win the tournament. He finished with an overall score of 278 (−10), one shot ahead of runner-up Will Zalatoris. At the conclusion of the tournament, Matsuyama's caddie, Shota Hayafuji, bowed to the 18th fairway of the Augusta course as a gesture of Japanese respect.

In August, Matsuyama finished in a tie for 3rd place at the Olympic Games. He lost in a 7-man playoff for the bronze medal. The following week Matsuyama was tied for the lead after 72 holes at the WGC-FedEx St. Jude Invitational. He was beaten in the playoff when Abraham Ancer birdied the second extra hole.

In October 2021, Matsuyama won the Zozo Championship at Narashino Country Club. The Zozo Championship is the only PGA Tour event held in Japan. Matsuyama won by five strokes over Cameron Tringale and Brendan Steele.

On 16 January 2022, Matsuyama won the Sony Open in Hawaii; having made up a five-shot deficit on the back nine to get into a playoff with Russell Henley, he made an eagle on the first extra hole to claim the victory. It was his eighth win on the PGA Tour, tying K. J. Choi for most tour victories by an Asian-born player.

On 2 June 2022, at the Memorial Tournament at Muirfield Village Golf Club in Dublin, Ohio, Matsuyama was disqualified midway through his first round due to having a white paint-like substance on the face of his 3-wood. The substance was said to have been applied by his equipment technician to help with alignment.

Matsuyama qualified for the International team at the 2022 Presidents Cup; he won one, tied one and lost three of the five matches he played.

On 18 February 2024, Matsuyama won the Genesis Invitational. He entered the final round six strokes off the lead, but overcame the deficit, shooting a 62 to win his first PGA Tour event since the 2022 Sony Open in Hawaii. Matsuyama posted the second-lowest round in course history. It was also the lowest in the fourth round of a tournament at Riviera Country Club.

In August, Matsuyama won the bronze medal at the 2024 Olympic Games. He finished two shots behind Scottie Scheffler, the gold medalist, and one shot behind Tommy Fleetwood, the silver medalist, with a score of 267 (−17). Later that month, he won the FedEx St. Jude Championship by two strokes with a score of 263 (−17). Matsuyama nearly lost control of a five shot lead in the final round after errant shots on the back nine, but birdies on the last two holes brought him his 10th victory on the PGA Tour.

In January, Matsuyama won The Sentry, three strokes ahead of Collin Morikawa. His winning score of 35-under 257 broke the PGA Tour scoring record in relation to par, previously set by Cameron Smith in 2022 at 34-under total, also at The Sentry.

== Personal life ==
Matsuyama and his wife Mei (married in January 2017) have a daughter born in July 2017.

After winning a bronze medal at the Paris Olympics in August 2024, Matsuyama became the victim of a robbery in London, while in the city during a layover to Memphis, Tennessee for the FedEx St. Jude Championship. His wallet was stolen, and both his caddie and his coach had their passports stolen. Matsuyama's Olympic medal was not among the stolen items.

== Amateur wins ==
- 2010 Asia-Pacific Amateur Championship
- 2011 Japan Collegiate Championship, World University Games, Asia-Pacific Amateur Championship
- 2012 Japan Collegiate Championship

== Professional wins (21) ==
=== PGA Tour wins (11) ===
Legend
Major championships (1)
World Golf Championships (2)
FedEx Cup playoff events (1)
Signature events (2)
Other PGA Tour (5)

No.	Date	Tournament	Winning score	Margin of victory	Runner(s)-up
1	1 Jun 2014	Memorial Tournament	−13 (70-67-69-69=275)	Playoff	(United States) Kevin Na
2	7 Feb 2016	Waste Management Phoenix Open	−14 (65-70-68-67=270)	Playoff	(United States) Rickie Fowler
3	30 Oct 2016	WGC-HSBC Champions	−23 (66-65-68-66=265)	7 strokes	(United States) Daniel Berger, (Sweden) Henrik Stenson
4	5 Feb 2017	Waste Management Phoenix Open (2)	−17 (65-68-68-66=267)	Playoff	(United States) Webb Simpson
5	6 Aug 2017	WGC-Bridgestone Invitational	−16 (69-67-67-61=264)	5 strokes	(United States) Zach Johnson
6	11 Apr 2021	Masters Tournament	−10 (69-71-65-73=278)	1 stroke	(United States) Will Zalatoris
7	24 Oct 2021	Zozo Championship^{1}	−15 (64-68-68-65=265)	5 strokes	(United States) Brendan Steele, (United States) Cameron Tringale
8	16 Jan 2022	Sony Open in Hawaii	−23 (66-65-63-63=257)	Playoff	(United States) Russell Henley
9	18 Feb 2024	Genesis Invitational	−17 (69-68-68-62=267)	3 strokes	(United States) Luke List, (United States) Will Zalatoris
10	18 Aug 2024	FedEx St. Jude Championship	−17 (65-64-64-70=263)	2 strokes	(Norway) Viktor Hovland, (United States) Xander Schauffele
11	5 Jan 2025	The Sentry	−35 (65-65-62-65=257)	3 strokes	(United States) Collin Morikawa

^{1}Co-sanctioned by the Japan Golf Tour, but unofficial event on that tour.

PGA Tour playoff record (4–2)

No.	Year	Tournament	Opponent(s)	Result
1	2014	Memorial Tournament	(United States) Kevin Na	Won with par on first extra hole
2	2016	Waste Management Phoenix Open	(United States) Rickie Fowler	Won with par on fourth extra hole
3	2017	Waste Management Phoenix Open	(United States) Webb Simpson	Won with birdie on fourth extra hole
4	2021	WGC-FedEx St. Jude Invitational	(Mexico) Abraham Ancer, (United States) Sam Burns	Ancer won with birdie on second extra hole
5	2022	Sony Open in Hawaii	(United States) Russell Henley	Won with eagle on first extra hole
6	2026	WM Phoenix Open	(United States) Chris Gotterup	Lost to birdie on first extra hole

=== Japan Golf Tour wins (8) ===
Legend
Flagship events (1)
Japan majors (1) (Note: The 2016 Japan Open Golf Championship was also a Japan major championship.)
Other Japan Golf Tour (7)

No.	Date	Tournament	Winning score	Margin of victory	Runner(s)-up
1	13 Nov 2011	Mitsui Sumitomo Visa Taiheiyo Masters (as an amateur)	−13 (71-64-68=203) (Note: Shortened to 54 holes due to weather.)	2 strokes	(Japan) Toru Taniguchi
2	28 Apr 2013	Tsuruya Open	−18 (69-63-68-66=266)	1 stroke	(United States) David Oh
3	2 Jun 2013	Diamond Cup Golf	−9 (71-69-68-71=279)	2 strokes	(Australia) Brad Kennedy, (South Korea) Kim Hyung-sung, (South Korea) Park Sung-joon
4	8 Sep 2013	Fujisankei Classic	−9 (66-70-66-73=275)	Playoff	(South Korea) Park Sung-joon, (Japan) Hideto Tanihara
5	1 Dec 2013	Casio World Open	−12 (72-66-68-70=276)	1 stroke	(Japan) Yuta Ikeda
6	23 Nov 2014	Dunlop Phoenix Tournament	−15 (68-64-67-70=269)	Playoff	(Japan) Hiroshi Iwata
7	16 Oct 2016	Japan Open Golf Championship	−5 (71-70-65-69=275)	3 strokes	(Japan) Yuta Ikeda, (South Korea) Lee Kyoung-hoon
8	13 Nov 2016	Mitsui Sumitomo Visa Taiheiyo Masters (2)	−23 (65-66-65-69=265)	7 strokes	(South Korea) Song Young-han

Japan Golf Tour playoff record (2–0)

No.	Year	Tournament	Opponent(s)	Result
1	2013	Fujisankei Classic	(South Korea) Park Sung-joon, (Japan) Hideto Tanihara	Won with birdie on second extra hole
2	2014	Dunlop Phoenix Tournament	(Japan) Hiroshi Iwata	Won with par on first extra hole

=== Other wins (2) ===
No.	Date	Tournament	Winning score	Margin of victory	Runner-up
1	4 Dec 2016	Hero World Challenge	−18 (65-67-65-73=270)	2 strokes	(Sweden) Henrik Stenson
2	7 Dec 2025	Hero World Challenge (2)	−22 (68-66-68-64=266)	Playoff	(Sweden) Alex Norén

Other playoff record (1–0)

No.	Year	Tournament	Opponent	Result
1	2025	Hero World Challenge	(Sweden) Alex Norén	Won with birdie on first extra hole

== Major championships ==
=== Wins (1) ===
Year	Championship	54 holes	Winning score	Margin	Runner-up
2021	Masters Tournament	4 shot lead	−10 (69-71-65-73=278)	1 stroke	(United States) Will Zalatoris

=== Results timeline ===
Results not in chronological order in 2020.

Tournament	2011	2012	2013	2014	2015	2016	2017	2018
Masters Tournament	T27LA	T54		CUT	5	T7	T11	19
U.S. Open			T10	T35	T18	CUT	T2	T16
The Open Championship			T6	T39	T18	CUT	T14	CUT
PGA Championship			T19	T35	T37	T4	T5	T35

Tournament	2019	2020	2021	2022	2023	2024	2025	2026
Masters Tournament	T32	T13	1	T14	T16	T38	T21	T12
PGA Championship	T16	T22	T23	T60	T29	T35	CUT	T26
U.S. Open	T21	T17	T26	4	T32	6	T42	T65
The Open Championship	CUT	NT		T68	T13	T66	T16	T14

Win
Top 10
Did not play

LA = low amateur
CUT = missed the half-way cut
"T" indicates a tie for a place
NT = no tournament due to COVID-19 pandemic

=== Summary ===
Tournament	Wins	2nd	3rd	Top-5	Top-10	Top-25	Events	Cuts made
Masters Tournament	1	0	0	2	3	10	15	14
PGA Championship	0	0	0	2	2	6	14	13
U.S. Open	0	1	0	2	4	8	14	13
The Open Championship	0	0	0	0	1	6	12	9
Totals	1	1	0	6	10	30	55	49

- Most consecutive cuts made – 19 (2020 PGA – 2025 Masters)
- Longest streak of top-10s – 2 (2013 U.S. Open – 2013 Open Championship)

== Results in The Players Championship ==
Tournament	2014	2015	2016	2017	2018	2019	2020	2021	2023	2024	2025	2026
The Players Championship	T23	T17	T7	T22	CUT	T8	C	CUT	5	T6	CUT	T27

Top 10

CUT = missed the halfway cut
"T" indicates a tie for a place
C = cancelled after the first round due to the COVID-19 pandemic

== World Golf Championships ==
=== Wins (2) ===
Year	Championship	54 holes	Winning score	Margin	Runner(s)-up
2016	WGC-HSBC Champions	3 shot lead	−23 (66-65-68-66=265)	7 strokes	(United States) Daniel Berger, (Sweden) Henrik Stenson
2017	WGC-Bridgestone Invitational	2 shot deficit	−16 (69-67-67-61=264)	5 strokes	(United States) Zach Johnson

=== Results timeline ===
Results not in chronological order before 2015.

Tournament	2013	2014	2015	2016	2017	2018	2019	2020	2021	2022	2023
Championship		T34	T23	T35	T25		T19	T6	T15		
Match Play		R32	R16	T18	T51	T36	T24	NT^{1}	T42		T31
Invitational	T21	T12	T37	T42	1	T39	T43	T20	T2		
Champions	WD	T41	WD	1	T50	T30	T11	NT^{1}	NT^{1}	NT^{1}	

^{1}Cancelled due to COVID-19 pandemic

Win
Top 10
Did not play

WD = Withdrew
QF, R16, R32, R64 = Round in which player lost in match play
NT = No tournament
"T" = tied
Note that the Championship and Invitational were discontinued from 2022. The Champions was discontinued from 2023.

== PGA Tour career summary ==
Season	Starts	Cuts made	Wins (majors)	2nd	3rd	Top-10	Top-25	Earnings ($)	Money list rank
2011	2	1	0	0	0	0	0	0	0
2012	2	1	0	0	0	0	0	0	0
2013	7	6	0	0	0	2	6	690,473	0
2014	24	20	1	0	1	4	12	2,837,477	27
2015	25	23	0	1	2	9	19	3,758,619	15
2016	23	17	2	0	1	8	14	4,193,954	9
2017	22	20	2	3	0	7	12	8,380,570	4
2018	21	18	0	0	0	4	12	2,687,477	39
2019	24	22	0	0	2	7	15	3,335,137	23
2020	20	17	0	1	2	5	14	3,665,825	12
2021	27	22	1 (1)	2	0	3	10	4,963,594	18
2022	21	17	2	0	1	6	10	5,776,298	12
2023	26	22	0	0	0	2	11	3,874,772	46
Career*	244	206	8 (1)	7	9	57	135	44,164,197	18

* As of the 2023 season

== Team appearances ==
Amateur

- Eisenhower Trophy (representing Japan): 2008, 2012
- World University Games (representing Japan): 2011 (winners)
- Bonallack Trophy (representing Asia/Pacific): 2012

Professional

- Presidents Cup (representing the International team): 2013, 2015, 2017, 2019, 2022, 2024, 2026
- World Cup (representing Japan): 2016
