= Ol' Colony Golf Complex =

Public golf course in Tuscaloosa, Alabama USA

- Interactive map of Ol' Colony Golf Complex
- 33°15′21″N 87°32′17″W

Club information
- Location: Tuscaloosa, Alabama
- Established: 2000
- Type: Municipal
- Owner: Tuscaloosa PARA
- Total holes: 18
- Designed by: Jerry Pate
- Par: 72
- Length: 7,544
- Course rating: 76.6
- Slope rating: 138

Ol' Colony Golf Complex is a municipal public golf course in Tuscaloosa, Alabama, United States. The 18-hole course opened in December 2000 on 597 acres that was once a farm plantation for a mental institution named Cain's Colony. Ol' Colony was designed by professional golfer Jerry Pate, who played golf for The University of Alabama.

The University of Alabama made Ol’ Colony its home course and constructed a training facility, The Jerry Pate Center, on the grounds in 2005. In 2008, Golf Digest ranked Ol’ Colony as one of the Top 100 "Best Places You Can Play" and recently a "Top 10 in Alabama Course."

Ol’ Colony also operates the Tuscaloosa chapter of The First Tee program, a youth golf program designed to promote character development and life-enhancing values through the game of golf.

== See also ==
- Alabama Crimson Tide golf
