= Adam Mitchell (golfer) =

American golfer

Personal information
- Nationality: United States
- Born: February 16, 1987 (age 39) Chattanooga, Tennessee, U.S.
- Height: 5 ft 9 in (1.75 m)
- Weight: 145 lb (66 kg; 10.4 st)

Career
- Sport: Golf
- College: University of Georgia
- Turned professional: 2009
- Former tour: Web.com Tour

Adam Mitchell (born February 16, 1987) is an American professional golfer.

== Amateur career ==
Mitchell was born in Chattanooga, Tennessee and went to the University of Georgia. During his college golf career, he was a second-team All-American selection, named first-team All-SEC, 2008 Ping Southeast All-Region, posted six top ten finishes in 2008 collegiate golf and was an honorable mention All-American in 2007. He was a member of the winning 2009 American Walker Cup team and competed in the 2008 and 2009 Palmer Cups.

== Professional career ==
Mitchell turned pro after the 2009 Walker Cup was completed.

== Amateur wins ==
- 2008 Porter Cup

== U.S. national team appearances ==
Amateur

- Walker Cup: 2009 (winners)
- Palmer Cup: 2008, 2009
