= Jerry Pate =

American professional golfer (born 1953)

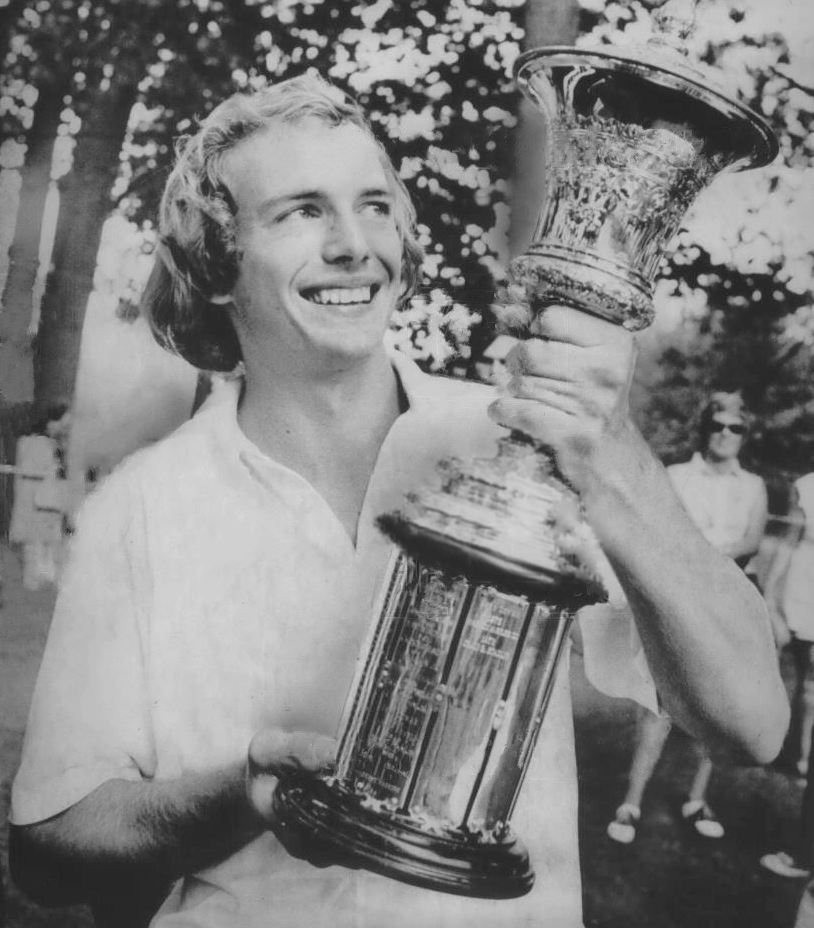
- Pate after winning the 1974 U.S. Amateur

Personal information
- Full name: Jerome Kendrick Pate
- Nationality: United States
- Born: September 16, 1953 (age 73) Macon, Georgia, U.S.
- Height: 5 ft 11 in (1.80 m)
- Weight: 180 lb (82 kg; 13 st)
- Spouse: Soozi Nelson Pate (m. 1975)
- Children: 3

Career
- Sport: Golf
- College: University of Alabama
- Turned professional: 1975
- Current tour: PGA Tour Champions
- Former tour: PGA Tour
- Professional wins: 15

Number of wins by tour
- PGA Tour: 8
- Japan Golf Tour: 2
- PGA Tour Champions: 2
- Other: 3

Best results in major championships (wins: 1)
- Masters Tournament: T3: 1982
- PGA Championship: 2nd: 1978
- U.S. Open: Won: 1976
- The Open Championship: T15: 1977

Jerome Kendrick Pate (born September 16, 1953) is an American professional golfer on the PGA Tour Champions, formerly on the PGA Tour. As a 22-year-old rookie, he won the U.S. Open in 1976.

== Early life ==
Born in Macon, Georgia, he was one of six children in his family. His father and grandfather got him into golf early and the family spent summers in Jacksonville Beach, Florida, playing golf.

At a young age, his family moved to Alabama, where Pate learned the game at Anniston Country Club. In 1967 his family moved to Florida because of Pate's fathers work. Pate grew up in the panhandle of Florida in Pensacola.

== Amateur career ==
Pate attended the University of Alabama in Tuscaloosa and played on its Crimson Tide golf team.

Pate had a distinguished amateur career with a win at the U.S. Amateur in 1974, and was a member of victorious U.S. teams at the Eisenhower Trophy competition, also winning individually, later that year and at the Walker Cup in May 1975 at St Andrews in Scotland. A few weeks later, he tied Walker Cup teammate Jay Haas of Wake Forest for low amateur at the U.S. Open, finishing in a six-way tie for eighteenth place at Medinah, outside Chicago.

== Professional career ==
In 1975, Pate turned professional. Late in the year he was the medalist at Fall 1975 PGA Tour Qualifying School. During his rookie season he won the 1976 U.S. Open. He also won the Canadian Open that year. Pate closed with a 63 (−7) to defeat runner-up Jack Nicklaus by four strokes.

Six more tour victories followed in ensuing years as well as several other titles around the world. He was a member of the victorious Ryder Cup team in 1981, but shoulder injuries curtailed his career. His final win on the PGA Tour came at age 28. That final victory was at the 1982 Tournament Players Championship, the first held at TPC at Sawgrass. Pate celebrated by throwing course designer Pete Dye and PGA Tour commissioner Deane Beman into the lake adjacent to the 18th green, then jumped in himself. He had also jumped in the water after a victory the previous June, after going nearly three years without a win.

=== Later career ===
Pate later served as a golf broadcaster for ABC, CBS, and BBC. He also set up a golf course design practice and a turf and irrigation company. He designed the Kiva Dunes in 1995 and the Ol' Colony Golf Complex in 2000, which is the home course for the Alabama Crimson Tide golf team. He also designed the course at Shadow Isle Golf Club in Colts Neck, New Jersey, which is now Trump National Golf Club Colts Neck. In 2006, he earned his first Champions Tour win at the Outback Steakhouse Pro-Am. Pate has been forced by health problems, including arthroscopic left-knee surgery in 2010, to begin limiting his Champions Tour appearances.

== Personal life ==
In the late 1990s, Pate returned to the University of Alabama to complete his bachelor's degree in administrative science. His daughter, Jenni, received her degree at the same graduation ceremony in 2001.

== Awards and honors ==
- In 1994, Pate was inducted into the Alabama Sports Hall of Fame.
- In 2023, Pate was inducted into the Florida State Golf Association Hall of Fame.
- In 2025, Pate was inducted into the Georgia Sports Hall of Fame.

== Amateur wins ==
- 1974 U.S. Amateur, Florida Amateur

== Professional wins (15) ==
=== PGA Tour wins (8) ===
Legend
Major championships (1)
Players Championships (1)
Other PGA Tour (6)

No.	Date	Tournament	Winning score	To par	Margin of victory	Runner(s)-up
1	Jun 20, 1976	U.S. Open	71-69-69-68=277	−3	2 strokes	(United States) Al Geiberger, (United States) Tom Weiskopf
2	Jul 25, 1976	Canadian Open	69-67-68-63=267	−13	4 strokes	(United States) Jack Nicklaus
3	Jan 9, 1977	Phoenix Open	67-67-70-73=277	−7	Playoff	(United States) Dave Stockton
4	Oct 23, 1977	Southern Open	64-67-69-66=266	−14	7 strokes	(United States) Phil Hancock, (United States) Mac McLendon, (United States) Johnny Miller, (United States) Steve Taylor
5	Sep 10, 1978	Southern Open (2)	67-67-66-69=269	−11	1 stroke	(United States) Phil Hancock
6	Jun 28, 1981	Danny Thomas Memphis Classic	69-70-66-69=274	−14	2 strokes	(United States) Tom Kite, (United States) Bruce Lietzke
7	Oct 18, 1981	Pensacola Open	66-69-65-71=271	−17	3 strokes	(United States) Steve Melnyk
8	Mar 21, 1982	Tournament Players Championship	70-73-70-67=280	−8	2 strokes	(United States) Brad Bryant, (United States) Scott Simpson

PGA Tour playoff record (1–2)

No.	Year	Tournament	Opponent(s)	Result
1	1977	Phoenix Open	(United States) Dave Stockton	Won with birdie on first extra hole
2	1978	PGA Championship	(United States) John Mahaffey, (United States) Tom Watson	Mahaffey won with birdie on second extra hole
3	1980	Sea Pines Heritage	(United States) Doug Tewell	Lost to par on first extra hole

=== PGA of Japan Tour wins (2) ===
No.	Date	Tournament	Winning score	To par	Margin of victory	Runner(s)-up
1	Oct 10, 1976	Taiheiyo Club Masters	70-70-68-71=279	−5	2 strokes	(Japan) Isao Aoki
2	Nov 9, 1980	ABC Japan vs USA Golf Matches	70-69-72-65=276	−12	1 stroke	(United States) Tom Purtzer, (Japan) Norio Suzuki

=== South American Golf Circuit wins (2) ===
No.	Date	Tournament	Winning score	To par	Margin of victory	Runner-up
1	Nov 23, 1980	Brazil Open	69-70-69-66=274	−10	Playoff	(Spain) Manuel Piñero
2	Dec 13, 1981	Colombian Open	64-67-66-65=262	−26	21 strokes	(Colombia) Luis Arevalo

=== Other wins (1) ===
No.	Date	Tournament	Winning score	To par	Margin of victory	Runners-up
1	Dec 4, 1977	Pepsi-Cola Mixed Team Championship (with (United States) Hollis Stacy)	61-70-69-70=270	−18	1 stroke	(United States) Nancy Lopez and (United States) Curtis Strange

=== Champions Tour wins (2) ===
No.	Date	Tournament	Winning score	To par	Margin of victory	Runners-up
1	Feb 26, 2006	Outback Steakhouse Pro-Am	68-68-66=202	−11	1 stroke	(United States) Morris Hatalsky, (United States) Hale Irwin, (England) Mark James
2	Jan 27, 2008	Turtle Bay Championship	71-70-70=211	−5	2 strokes	(South Africa) Fulton Allem, (United States) Jim Thorpe

Champions Tour playoff record (0–1)

No.	Year	Tournament	Opponents	Result
1	2005	Senior PGA Championship	(United States) Dana Quigley, (United States) Mike Reid	Reid won with birdie on first extra hole

== Major championships ==
=== Wins (1) ===
Year	Championship	54 holes	Winning score	Margin	Runners-up
1976	U.S. Open	2 shot deficit	−3 (71-69-69-68=277)	2 strokes	(United States) Al Geiberger, (United States) Tom Weiskopf

=== Results timeline ===
Tournament	1975	1976	1977	1978	1979
Masters Tournament	37		T14	T18	T41
U.S. Open	T18 LA	1	CUT	T16	T2
The Open Championship		CUT	T15	WD	T26
PGA Championship		T4	5	T2	T5

Tournament	1980	1981	1982	1983	1984	1985	1986	1987	1988	1989
Masters Tournament	T6	T5	T3							
U.S. Open	CUT	T26	CUT	CUT		CUT	WD			CUT
The Open Championship	T16	T19	WD							
PGA Championship	T10	T11	T9	T23	CUT					

Tournament	1990	1991	1992	1993	1994	1995	1996	1997	1998	1999
Masters Tournament										
U.S. Open		CUT								
The Open Championship										
PGA Championship	CUT									

Tournament	2000	2001	2002	2003	2004	2005	2006	2007	2008	2009
Masters Tournament										
U.S. Open										
The Open Championship										
PGA Championship		CUT								

Tournament	2010	2011
Masters Tournament		
U.S. Open		
The Open Championship		
PGA Championship		CUT

Win
Top 10
Did not play

LA = Low amateur
CUT = missed the halfway cut (3rd round cut in 1976 Open Championship)
WD = withdrew
"T" indicates a tie for a place.

=== Summary ===
Tournament	Wins	2nd	3rd	Top-5	Top-10	Top-25	Events	Cuts made
Masters Tournament	0	0	1	2	3	5	7	7
U.S. Open	1	1	0	2	2	4	13	5
The Open Championship	0	0	0	0	0	3	7	4
PGA Championship	0	1	0	4	6	8	12	8
Totals	1	2	1	8	11	20	39	24

- Most consecutive cuts made – 7 (1980 Open Championship – 1982 Masters)
- Longest streak of top-10s – 2 (twice)

== The Players Championship ==
=== Wins (1) ===
Year	Championship	54 holes	Winning score	Margin	Runners-up
1982	Tournament Players Championship	3 shot deficit	−8 (70-73-70-67=280)	2 strokes	(United States) Brad Bryant, (United States) Scott Simpson

=== Results timeline ===
Tournament	1978	1979	1980	1981	1982	1983	1984	1985	1986	1987	1988	1989	1990	1991	1992
The Players Championship	T17	T20	CUT	T45	1		CUT	T64				CUT	CUT	CUT	CUT

Win
Did not play

CUT = missed the halfway cut
"T" indicates a tie for a place.

== U.S. national team appearances ==
Amateur

- Eisenhower Trophy: 1974 (team winners and joint individual leader)
- Walker Cup: 1975 (winners)

Professional

- Ryder Cup: 1981 (winners)
- World Cup: 1976

== See also ==
- Fall 1975 PGA Tour Qualifying School graduates
