= Sycamore Hills Golf Club =

Coordinates: 41.063808°N 85.292512°W

- Interactive map of Sycamore Hills Golf Club

Club information
- Location: Fort Wayne, Indiana
- Established: July 1987
- Type: Private
- Owner: Rick & Marty Rifkin
- Tota holes: 18
- Tournaments: Junior PGA Championship; U.S. Open and U.S. Amateur qualifiers; Indiana State Amateur; Indiana State Senior Amateur; Indiana PGA Section Championship; PGA Professional National Championship qualifier; Mid-West Collegiate Tournament; USGA Women's State Team Championship; Jack Nicklaus Cup Matches; Hotel Fitness Championship
- Greens: Bent grass
- Fairways: Bent grass
- Website: sycamorehillsgolfclub.com
- Designed by: Jack Nicklaus
- Par: 72
- Length: 7,288
- Course rating: 77.0
- Slope rating: 148

Sycamore Hills Golf Course is located in Fort Wayne, Indiana, United States. Sycamore Hills is a private 18-hole golf course that was designed by Jack Nicklaus, and constructed in 1987 on the former estate of a prominent Fort Wayne-area family.

== Major tournaments hosted ==
In 2013, Sycamore Hills hosted the inaugural Hotel Fitness Championship, which was won by Trevor Immelman. The club hosted the tournament through 2015.

Previously, Sycamore Hills hosted the Junior PGA Championship, U.S. Open and U.S. Amateur qualifiers, the Indiana State Amateur, the Indiana State Senior Amateur, the Indiana PGA Section Championship, PGA Professional National Championship qualifier, Mid-West Collegiate Tournament, the USGA Women's State Team Championship and Jack Nicklaus Cup Matches.

== Honors ==
- 1993–2004, 2007–2012: Ranked by Golf Digest as one of "America's 100 Greatest Golf Courses"
- 1994–2001, 2011: Ranked on by Golf World as one of "America’s 100 Best Golf Shops," Top 25 Private Clubs
- 2009: Ranked by Golf Digest as one of the "75 Top Practice Areas"

== Course information ==
Sycamore Hills has a clubhouse, pro shop, driving range, putting green, and restaurant.

The 18-hole course has a Par of 72 with 5 sets of tees:

- Gold, the back tees with a total length of 7,275 yards
- Blue, the second-to-last tees with a total length of 6,765 yards
- White, the third-to-last tees with a total length of 6,258 yards
- Green, the fourth-to-last tees with a total length of 5,812 yards
- Red, the last tees with a total length of 5,232 yards

Tee	Rating/Slope	1	2	3	4	5	6	7	8	9	Out	10	11	12	13	14	15	16	17	18	In	Total
Black	77.0 / 148	444	535	391	224	562	427	180	467	412	3650	421	228	549	377	202	535	437	409	444	3638	7288
Gold	76.3 / 147	444	535	391	206	546	405	188	450	405	3570	421	228	531	360	202	523	473	394	444	3576	7146
Blue	73.8 / 143	417	519	344	194	521	387	162	437	385	3366	404	203	511	348	172	489	428	376	411	3342	6708
White	71.6 / 139	382	439	334	178	507	365	131	415	352	3157	379	177	461	325	157	474	389	339	397	3098	6255
Green	69.4 / 134	370	460	312	165	453	323	118	392	330	2923	368	167	446	302	149	445	335	320	383	2915	5838
Red	71.5 / 131	347	401	301	124	425	308	111	375	315	2707	338	149	405	242	109	397	272	250	343	2505	5212
Par		4	5	4	3	5	4	3	4	4	36	4	3	5	4	3	5	4	4	4	36	72
SI	Men's	7	15	11	17	5	3	13	1	9		4	14	10	12	18	6	2	16	8
SI	Women's	5	11	17	15	3	1	13	9	7		10	14	6	12	18	8	2	16	4
