= Hotel Fitness Championship =

American golf tournament

Tournament information
- Location: Fort Wayne, Indiana
- Established: 2013
- Course: Sycamore Hills Golf Club
- Par: 72
- Length: 7,275 yards (6,652 m)
- Tour: Web.com Tour
- Format: Stroke play
- Prize fund: US$1,000,000
- Month played: August
- Final year: 2015

Tournament record score
- Aggregate: 268 Trevor Immelman (2013); 268 Bud Cauley (2014)
- To par: −20 as above

Final champion
- (Sweden) Henrik Norlander
- Location in the United States Location in Indiana

The Hotel Fitness Championship was a golf tournament on the Web.com Tour. It was played for the first time in August/September 2013 at the Sycamore Hills Golf Club in Fort Wayne, Indiana. It was the first of four tournaments making up the Web.com Tour Finals, the series that replaced qualifying school for determining the 50 players earning PGA Tour cards for the following season. Proceeds from the championship benefited the Evans Scholars Foundation.

== Winners ==
Web.com Tour (Finals)	2013–2015

#	Year	Winner	Score	To par	Margin of victory	Runner(s)-up
3rd	2015	(Sweden) Henrik Norlander	269	−19	3 strokes	(South Korea) Lee Dong-hwan (United States) Michael Thompson
2nd	2014	(United States) Bud Cauley	268	−20	1 stroke	(United States) Colt Knost
1st	2013	(South Africa) Trevor Immelman	268	−20	1 stroke	(United States) Patrick Cantlay

== See also ==
- Fort Wayne Open – an earlier tournament (1990–92) on the same tour
