= 2009 Walker Cup =

Golf tournament

Coordinates: 40.001°N 75.312°W

42nd Walker Cup Match
- Dates: September 12–13, 2009
- Venue: Merion Golf Club
- Location: Ardmore, Pennsylvania
- Captains: Buddy Marucci (USA); Colin Dalgleish (GB&I)
(United States)	16½	9½	(United Kingdom) (Republic of Ireland)
- United States wins the Walker Cup

The 42nd Walker Cup Match was played on September 12 and 13, 2009 at the Merion Golf Club (East course) in Ardmore, Pennsylvania, United States. Team United States won 16½ to 9½ for its third consecutive win.

== Format ==
On Saturday, there are four matches of foursomes in the morning and eight singles matches in the afternoon. On Sunday, there are again four matches of foursomes in the morning, followed by ten singles matches (involving every player) in the afternoon. This was a change from previous years (and the first format change in 46 years) when there were only eight singles matches on Sunday. In all, 26 matches are played.

Each of the 26 matches was worth one point in the larger team competition. If a match was all square after the 18th hole extra holes were not played. The team with most points won the competition. If the two teams were tied, the previous winner would retain the trophy.

== The course ==
The Merion Golf Club (East course) in Ardmore, Pennsylvania is a par 70 course. Hugh Irvine Wilson is credited with designing it, and it opened for play in 1912. It has hosted various USGA events including six U.S. Amateurs, four U.S. Women's Amateurs, and four U.S. Opens. It has also hosted the Curtis Cup and Eisenhower Trophy team events.

== Teams ==
Ten players for the USA and Great Britain & Ireland participate in the event plus one non-playing captain for each team.

Team USA
Name	Age	Hometown	Notes
Buddy Marucci	57	Villanova, Pennsylvania	non-playing captain
Bud Cauley	19	Jacksonville, Florida	Won 2009 Players Amateur
Rickie Fowler	20	Murrieta, California	Won 2008 Sunnehanna Amateur
Brendan Gielow	21	Muskegon, Michigan	Won 2008 Northeast Amateur, 2009 Porter Cup
Brian Harman	22	Savannah, Georgia	Won 2009 Dogwood Invitational
Morgan Hoffmann	19	Wyckoff, New Jersey	Won 2009 Big 12 Conference title
Adam Mitchell	22	Chattanooga, Tennessee	Won 2008 Porter Cup
Nathan Smith	31	Pittsburgh, Pennsylvania	Won 2003 U.S. Mid-Amateur
Cameron Tringale	22	San Juan Capistrano, California	Qualified for 2009 U.S. Open
Peter Uihlein	20	Orlando, Florida	Won 2008 Florida Azalea Amateur
Drew Weaver	22	High Point, North Carolina	Won 2007 British Amateur

& Team Great Britain & Ireland
Name	Age	Hometown	Notes
(Scotland) Colin Dalgleish	48	Helensburgh, Scotland	non-playing captain
(Scotland) Wallace Booth	24	Comrie, Scotland
(Scotland) Gavin Dear	25	Scone, Scotland	Won 2009 Irish Open Amateur
(England) Tommy Fleetwood	18	Southport, England	Runner-up in 2008 British Amateur
(England) Luke Goddard	22	London, England	Won 2009 English Amateur
(England) Matt Haines	19	Chatham, England	Won 2008 Lytham Trophy
(England) Stiggy Hodgson	20	Chester, England
(England) Sam Hutsby	20	Liphook, England	Runner-up in 2009 British Amateur
(Republic of Ireland) Niall Kearney	21	Dublin, Ireland	Won 2009 Brabazon Trophy
(England) Chris Paisley	23	Prudhoe, England	Runner-up in 2008 English Amateur
(England) Dale Whitnell	21	Tiptree, England	Won Portuguese Open Amateur and Tillman Trophy in 2009

== Saturday's matches ==
=== Morning foursomes ===
&	Results
Booth/Hutsby	(United States) 2 and 1	Harman/Hoffmann
Dear/Haines	(United States) 1 up	Uihlein/Smith
Goddard/Whitnell	(United States) 6 and 5	Fowler/Cauley
Hodgson/Kearney	(United Kingdom) (Republic of Ireland) 3 and 1	Tringale/Mitchell
1	Foursomes	3
1	Overall	3

=== Afternoon singles ===
&	Results
Gavin Dear	halved	Brian Harman
Sam Hutsby	(United States) 7 and 6	Rickie Fowler
Wallace Booth	halved	Cameron Tringale
Matt Haines	halved	Morgan Hoffmann
Tommy Fleetwood	(United States) 2 and 1	Peter Uihlein
Chris Paisley	halved	Drew Weaver
Niall Kearney	(United States) 2 and 1	Bud Cauley
Stiggy Hodgson	(United Kingdom) (Republic of Ireland) 2 and 1	Brendan Gielow
3	Singles	5
4	Overall	8

== Sunday's matches ==
=== Morning foursomes ===
&	Results
Dear/Haines	(United States) 3 and 2	Harman/Mitchell
Hodgson/Kearney	(United States) 1 up	Fowler/Cauley
Booth/Hutsby	(United Kingdom) (Republic of Ireland) 3 and 2	Weaver/Gielow
Paisley/Whitnell	(United States) 5 and 4	Smith/Uihlein
1	Foursomes	3
5	Overall	11

=== Afternoon singles ===
&	Results
Gavin Dear	(United Kingdom) (Republic of Ireland) 3 and 2	Brian Harman
Matt Haines	(United States) 2 and 1	Rickie Fowler
Stiggy Hodgson	(United States) 3 and 1	Peter Uihlein
Wallace Booth	(United States) 1 up	Morgan Hoffmann
Chris Paisley	halved	Bud Cauley
Sam Hutsby	(United Kingdom) (Republic of Ireland) 1 up	Adam Mitchell
Tommy Fleetwood	(United Kingdom) (Republic of Ireland) 1 up	Drew Weaver
Luke Goddard	(United States) 8 and 6	Cameron Tringale
Niall Kearney	(United Kingdom) (Republic of Ireland) 3 and 2	Nathan Smith
Dale Whitnell	(United States) 4 and 3	Brendan Gielow
4½	Singles	5½
9½	Overall	16½
