= 2009 Palmer Cup =

Team golf competition in the United States

- Dates: June 4–5, 2009
- Venue: Cherry Hills Country Club
- Location: Cherry Hills Village, Colorado
(United States)	11	13	(Europe)
- Europe wins the Palmer Cup

The 2009 Palmer Cup was held on June 4–5, 2009 at Cherry Hills Country Club, Cherry Hills Village, Colorado. Europe won 13 to 11.

== Format ==
On Thursday, there were four matches of four-ball in the morning, followed by eight singles matches in the afternoon. Four foursomes matches were played on the Friday morning with a further eight singles in the afternoon. In all, 24 matches were played.

Each of the 24 matches was worth one point in the larger team competition. If a match was all square after the 18th hole, each side earned half a point toward their team total. The team that accumulated at least 12½ points won the competition.

== Teams ==
Eight college golfers from the United States and Europe participated in the event.

United States
Name	College
Matt Thurmond head coach	Washington
Walter Chung assistant coach	California
Bud Cauley	Alabama
Erik Flores	UCLA
Morgan Hoffmann	Oklahoma State
Trent Leon	Oklahoma State
Adam Mitchell	Georgia
Cameron Tringale	Georgia Tech
Mike Van Sickle	Marquette
Steve Ziegler	Stanford

Europe
Name	Country	College
Dean Robertson head coach	Scotland	
Walle Danewid assistant coach	Sweden	
Jorge Campillo	Spain	Indiana
Stephan Gross	Germany	Arizona State
Leonardo Motta	Italy	IULM Milan
Henrik Norlander	Sweden	Augusta State
Chris Paisley	England	Tennessee
Andrea Pavan	Italy	Texas A&M
Tim Sluiter	Netherlands	Southern California
Robin Wingardh	Sweden	Tennessee

== Thursday's matches ==
=== Morning four-ball ===
	Results
Campillo/Sluiter	(Europe) 2 up	Cauley/Leon
Norlander/Wingardh	(Europe) 6 & 4	Flores/Mitchell
Motta/Pavan	(Europe) 2 up	Van Sickle/Ziegler
Gross/Paisley	(United States) 2 up	Hoffmann/Tringale
3	Four-ball	1
3	Overall	1

=== Afternoon singles ===
	Results
Robin Wingardh	(United States) 4 & 3	Bud Cauley
Jorge Campillo	(Europe) 1 up	Mike Van Sickle
Tim Sluiter	halved	Cameron Tringale
Leonardo Motta	(Europe) 2 up	Morgan Hoffmann
Stephan Gross	(Europe) 3 & 1	Erik Flores
Andrea Pavan	(United States) 2 & 1	Steve Ziegler
Chris Paisley	(United States) 4 & 2	Adam Mitchell
Henrik Norlander	(Europe) 3 & 2	Trent Leon
4½	Singles	3½
7½	Overall	4½

== Friday's matches ==
=== Morning foursomes ===
	Results
Campillo/Sluiter	(Europe) 5 & 4	Cauley/Van Sickle
Gross/Paisley	(United States) 1 up	Flores/Ziegler
Motta/Pavan	(Europe) 3 & 2	Leon/Mitchell
Norlander/Wingardh	(United States) 1 up	Hoffmann/Tringale
2	Foursomes	2
9½	Overall	6½

=== Afternoon singles ===
	Results
Jorge Campillo	(Europe) 2 & 1	Bud Cauley
Stephan Gross	(Europe) 5 & 4	Steve Ziegler
Tim Sluiter	(Europe) 1 up	Morgan Hoffmann
Chris Paisley	(United States) 1 up	Cameron Tringale
Leonardo Motta	(United States) 8 & 7	Mike Van Sickle
Andrea Pavan	halved	Erik Flores
Robin Wingardh	(United States) 2 & 1	Trent Leon
Henrik Norlander	(United States) 3 & 2	Adam Mitchell
3½	Singles	4½
13	Overall	11

== Michael Carter award ==
The Michael Carter Award winners were Trent Leon and Robin Wingardh.
