= 2017 WGC-Bridgestone Invitational =

Coordinates: 41.008°N 81.508°W

Tournament information
- Dates: August 3–6, 2017
- Location: Akron, Ohio, U.S.
- Course(s): Firestone Country Club; South Course
- Tour(s): PGA Tour; European Tour

Statistics
- Par: 70
- Length: 7,400 yards (6,767 m)
- Field: 76 players
- Cut: None
- Prize fund: $9,750,000 €8,278,143
- Winner's share: $1,660,000 €1,409,407

Champion
- (Japan) Hideki Matsuyama
- 264 (−16)

Location in the United States
Location in Ohio

The 2017 WGC-Bridgestone Invitational was a professional golf tournament held August 3–6 on the South Course of Firestone Country Club in Akron, Ohio. It was the 19th WGC-Bridgestone Invitational tournament, and the third of the World Golf Championships events in 2017.

Hideki Matsuyama won the tournament.

== Venue ==
=== Course layout ===
The South Course was designed by Bert Way and redesigned by Robert Trent Jones in 1960.

Hole	Yards	Par	Hole	Yards	Par
1	399	4	10	410	4
2	526	5	11	418	4
3	442	4	12	180	3
4	471	4	13	471	4
5	200	3	14	467	4
6	469	4	15	221	3
7	219	3	16	667	5
8	482	4	17	400	4
9	494	4	18	464	4
Out	3,702	35	In	3,698	35
Source:		Total		7,400	70

== Field ==
The field consisted of players drawn primarily from the Official World Golf Ranking and the winners of the worldwide tournaments with the strongest fields.

1. Playing members of the 2016 United States and European Ryder Cup teams.

Rafa Cabrera-Bello (2,3,4), Matt Fitzpatrick (2,3,4), Rickie Fowler (2,3,4), Sergio García (2,3,4), J. B. Holmes, Dustin Johnson (2,3,4), Zach Johnson, Brooks Koepka (2,3,4), Matt Kuchar (2,3), Rory McIlroy (2,3,4), Phil Mickelson (2,3), Ryan Moore (2,3), Thomas Pieters (2,3), Patrick Reed (2,3,4), Justin Rose (2,3,4), Jordan Spieth (2,3,4), Henrik Stenson (2,3,4), Andy Sullivan, Jimmy Walker (2,3,4), Lee Westwood, Danny Willett (2,3), Chris Wood

- Martin Kaymer did not play due to a shoulder injury.
- Brandt Snedeker (2,3) did not play due to a rib injury.

2. The top 50 players from the Official World Golf Ranking as of July 24, 2017.

Daniel Berger (3,4), Wesley Bryan (3,4), Paul Casey (3), Kevin Chappell (3,4), Jason Day (3), Jason Dufner (3,4), Ross Fisher (3), Tommy Fleetwood (3,4), Branden Grace (3), Emiliano Grillo (3), Bill Haas (3), Brian Harman (3,4), Tyrrell Hatton (3,4), Charley Hoffman (3), Billy Horschel (3,4), Kim Si-woo (3,4), Kevin Kisner (3,4), Russell Knox (3,4), Marc Leishman (3,4), Hideki Matsuyama (3,4), Francesco Molinari (3,4), Alex Norén (3,4), Louis Oosthuizen (3), Pat Perez (3,4), Jon Rahm (3,4), Charl Schwartzel (3), Adam Scott (3), Hideto Tanihara, Justin Thomas (3,4), Bubba Watson (3), Bernd Wiesberger (3), Gary Woodland (3)

3. The top 50 players from the Official World Golf Ranking as of July 31, 2017.

Jhonattan Vegas (4)

4. Tournament winners, whose victories are considered official, of tournaments from the Federation Tours since the prior season's Bridgestone Invitational with an Official World Golf Ranking Strength of Field Rating of 115 points or more.

Sam Brazel, Bryson DeChambeau, Adam Hadwin, Russell Henley, Mackenzie Hughes, Thongchai Jaidee, Thorbjørn Olesen, Rod Pampling, Renato Paratore, Andrés Romero, Xander Schauffele, Kyle Stanley, Brendan Steele, Hudson Swafford, Wang Jeung-hun, Fabrizio Zanotti

5. The winner of selected tournaments from each of the following tours

- Asian Tour: 2016 Order of Merit winner – Scott Hend
- PGA Tour of Australasia: Australian PGA Championship (2016) – Harold Varner III
- Japan Golf Tour: Bridgestone Open (2016) – Satoshi Kodaira
- Japan Golf Tour: Japan Golf Tour Championship – Shaun Norris
- Sunshine Tour: Dimension Data Pro-Am – Paul Lawrie

== Round summaries ==
=== First round ===
Thursday, August 3, 2017

Place	Player	Score	To par
1	(Belgium) Thomas Pieters	65	−5
2	(Scotland) Russell Knox	66	−4
T3	(England) Ross Fisher	67	−3
T3	(United States) Kevin Kisner	67	−3
T3	(Northern Ireland) Rory McIlroy	67	−3
T3	(Spain) Jon Rahm	67	−3
T3	(United States) Jordan Spieth	67	−3
T3	(United States) Bubba Watson	67	−3
T9	(Canada) Adam Hadwin	68	−2
T9	(United States) Charley Hoffman	68	−2
T9	(United States) Dustin Johnson	68	−2
T9	(Argentina) Andrés Romero	68	−2
T9	(Australia) Adam Scott	68	−2
T9	(United States) Jimmy Walker	68	−2

=== Second round ===
Friday, August 4, 2017

Place	Player	Score	To par
1	(United States) Jimmy Walker	68-65=133	−7
2	(Belgium) Thomas Pieters	65-70=135	−5
T3	(United States) Zach Johnson	69-67=136	−4
T3	(Japan) Hideki Matsuyama	69-67=136	−4
T3	(Northern Ireland) Rory McIlroy	67-69=136	−4
T6	(Australia) Jason Day	71-66=137	−3
T6	(Canada) Adam Hadwin	68-69=137	−3
T6	(United States) Charley Hoffman	68-69=137	−3
T6	(Scotland) Russell Knox	66-71=137	−3
T6	(Sweden) Alex Norén	69-68=137	−3
T6	(United States) Jordan Spieth	67-70=137	−3

=== Third round ===
Saturday, August 5, 2017

Place	Player	Score	To par
T1	(United States) Zach Johnson	69-67-65=201	−9
T1	(Belgium) Thomas Pieters	65-70-66=201	−9
3	(Australia) Scott Hend	70-69-63=202	−8
4	(Japan) Hideki Matsuyama	69-67-67=203	−7
T5	(United States) Charley Hoffman	68-69-67=204	−6
T5	(Canada) Adam Hadwin	68-69-67=204	−6
T5	(Northern Ireland) Rory McIlroy	67-69-68=204	−6
8	(Scotland) Russell Knox	66-71-68=205	−5
9	(England) Paul Casey	70-69-67=206	−4
T10	(United States) Daniel Berger	71-68-68=207	−3
T10	(United States) Kevin Chappell	72-67-68=207	−3
T10	(Australia) Jason Day	71-66-70=207	−3
T10	(United States) Brooks Koepka	71-68-68=207	−3
T10	(United States) Bubba Watson	67-74-66=207	−3
T10	(United States) Jimmy Walker	68-65-74=207	−3

=== Final round ===
Sunday, August 6, 2017

Place	Player	Score	To par	Money ($)
1	(Japan) Hideki Matsuyama	69-67-67-61=264	−16	1,660,000
2	(United States) Zach Johnson	69-67-65-68=269	−11	1,045,000
3	(United States) Charley Hoffman	68-69-67-66=270	−10	572,000
4	(Belgium) Thomas Pieters	65-70-66-71=272	−8	422,000
T5	(England) Paul Casey	70-69-67-67=273	−7	268,500
T5	(Canada) Adam Hadwin	68-69-67-69=273	−7	268,500
T5	(Scotland) Russell Knox	66-71-68-68=273	−7	268,500
T5	(Northern Ireland) Rory McIlroy	67-69-68-69=273	−7	268,500
9	(United States) Rickie Fowler	70-71-67-66=274	−6	186,000
T10	(Australia) Scott Hend	70-69-63-73=275	−5	154,667
T10	(Denmark) Thorbjørn Olesen	73-70-67-65=275	−5	154,667
T10	(United States) Hudson Swafford	70-69-70-66=275	−5	154,667

==== Scorecard ====
Final round

Hole	1	2	3	4	5	6	7	8	9	10	11	12	13	14	15	16	17	18
Par	4	5	4	4	3	4	3	4	4	4	4	3	4	4	3	5	4	4
(Japan) Matsuyama	−7	−9	−10	−10	−10	−11	−11	−11	−12	−12	−12	−12	−13	−13	−13	−14	−15	−16
(United States) Johnson	−9	−10	−9	−9	−9	−9	−9	−9	−10	−10	−11	−11	−11	−11	−11	−11	−11	−11
(United States) Hoffman	−6	−7	−7	−8	−8	−9	−10	−10	−10	−10	−11	−10	−11	−10	−10	−10	−10	−10
(Belgium) Pieters	−9	−10	−10	−10	−10	−10	−10	−9	−8	−8	−8	−8	−8	−8	−8	−8	−8	−8
(Australia) Hend	−8	−8	−8	−8	−8	−8	−7	−7	−7	−6	−6	−6	−6	−5	−5	−5	−5	−5

Cumulative tournament scores, relative to par

Eagle	Birdie	Bogey
