= 2016 WGC-HSBC Champions =

Coordinates: 31.109°N 121.216°E

Tournament information
- Dates: 27–30 October 2016
- Location: Shanghai, China
- Course(s): Sheshan Golf Club
- Tour(s): Asian Tour; European Tour; PGA Tour

Statistics
- Par: 72
- Length: 7,261 yards (6,639 m)
- Field: 78 players
- Cut: None
- Prize fund: $9,500,000
- Winner's share: $1,620,000

Champion
- (Japan) Hideki Matsuyama
- 265 (−23)

Location in China

The 2016 WGC-HSBC Champions was a golf tournament played from 27–30 October 2016 at the Sheshan Golf Club in Shanghai, China. It was the eighth WGC-HSBC Champions tournament, and the fourth of four World Golf Championships events held in the 2016 calendar year.

Hideki Matsuyama won by 7 strokes from Daniel Berger and Henrik Stenson. Matsuyama became the first Japanese golfer to win an individual World Golf Championship.

== Field ==
The following is a list of players who qualified for the 2016 WGC-HSBC Champions. The criteria are towards the leaders in points lists rather than tournament winners. Players who qualify from multiple categories will be listed in the first category in which they are eligible with the other qualifying categories in parentheses next to the player's name.

1. Winners of the four major championships and The Players Championship

Dustin Johnson (2,3,4), Henrik Stenson (3,5), Jimmy Walker (3,4), Danny Willett (3,5)

- Jason Day (2,3,4) did not play

2. Winners of the previous four World Golf Championships

Russell Knox (3,4), Adam Scott (3,4)

3. Top 50 from the OWGR on 10 October

An Byeong-hun, Daniel Berger (4), Rafa Cabrera-Bello (5), Paul Casey (4), Kevin Chappell (4), Matt Fitzpatrick (5), Rickie Fowler, Sergio García (5), Branden Grace (5), Emiliano Grillo (4), Bill Haas, Tyrrell Hatton (5), J. B. Holmes (4), Thongchai Jaidee (5), Martin Kaymer (5), Kevin Kisner (4), Søren Kjeldsen (5), Brooks Koepka, Matt Kuchar (4), Shane Lowry (5), Hideki Matsuyama (4), Rory McIlroy (4,5), Francesco Molinari (5), Ryan Moore (4), Kevin Na (4), Alex Norén (5), Louis Oosthuizen (5), Scott Piercy, Thomas Pieters (5), Patrick Reed (4), Charl Schwartzel (4,5,9), Justin Thomas (4), Bubba Watson (4), Lee Westwood (5), Chris Wood (5), Gary Woodland (4)

- Jim Furyk, Zach Johnson, William McGirt (4), Phil Mickelson (4), Justin Rose, Brandt Snedeker (4), and Jordan Spieth (4) did not play

4. Top 30 from the final 2016 FedEx Cup points list (if there are less than five available players, players beyond 30th will be selected to increase the number to five)

Roberto Castro, Kim Si-woo, Jason Kokrak, Sean O'Hair, Jhonattan Vegas

- Jason Dufner did not play

5. Top 30 from the Race to Dubai as of 17 October

Richard Bland, Grégory Bourdy, Bradley Dredge, Ross Fisher, Scott Hend (6), Andrew Johnston, Rikard Karlberg, Alexander Lévy, Joost Luiten, Bernd Wiesberger

- Andy Sullivan did not play

6. The leading four available players from the Asian Tour Order of Merit as of 17 October

Chan Shih-chang, Marcus Fraser, Miguel Tabuena, Wang Jeung-hun

7. The leading two available players from the Japan Golf Tour Order of Merit as of 17 October

Kim Kyung-tae, Hideto Tanihara

- Yuta Ikeda did not play.

8. The leading two available players from the final 2015 PGA Tour of Australasia Order of Merit

Nathan Holman, Jordan Zunic

9. The leading two available players from the final 2015 Sunshine Tour Order of Merit

Jacques Blaauw, George Coetzee

10. Six players from China

Dou Zecheng, Li Haotong, Liang Wenchong, Wu Ashun, Zhang Huilin, Zhang Xinjun

11. Alternates, if needed to fill the field of 78 players

- The next available player on the Orders of Merit of the Asian Tour, Japan Golf Tour, Sunshine Tour, and PGA Tour of Australasia, ranked in order of their position in the OWGR as of 10 October
- Next available player, not otherwise exempt, from Race to Dubai as of 17 October, OWGR as of 10 October, FedEx Cup list:
1. Song Young-han (Japan)
2. Lee Soo-min (Asia)
3. Dean Burmester (Sunshine)
4. Matthew Millar (Australasia)
5. Richard Sterne (Race to Dubai)

== Round summaries ==
=== First round ===
Thursday, 27 October 2016

Place	Player	Score	To par
1	(Sweden) Rikard Karlberg	64	−8
2	(United States) Rickie Fowler	65	−7
T3	(United States) Daniel Berger	66	−6
T3	(Scotland) Russell Knox	66	−6
T3	(Japan) Hideki Matsuyama	66	−6
T6	(England) Paul Casey	67	−5
T6	(United States) Bill Haas	67	−5
T6	(Italy) Francesco Molinari	67	−5
T9	(England) Richard Bland	68	−4
T9	(South Africa) Dean Burmester	68	−4
T9	(Spain) Sergio García	68	−4
T9	(Sweden) Alex Norén	68	−4
T9	(China) Zhang Xinjun	68	−4

=== Second round ===
Friday, 28 October 2016

Place	Player	Score	To par
1	(Japan) Hideki Matsuyama	66-65=131	−13
T2	(United States) Bill Haas	67-67=134	−10
T2	(Scotland) Russell Knox	66-68=134	−10
T4	(United States) Daniel Berger	66-70=136	−8
T4	(England) Richard Bland	68-68=136	−8
T4	(Italy) Francesco Molinari	67-69=136	−8
T7	(England) Paul Casey	67-70=137	−7
T7	(England) Ross Fisher	69-68=137	−7
T7	(Northern Ireland) Rory McIlroy	71-66=137	−7
T7	(China) Zhang Xinjun	68-69=137	−7

=== Third round ===
Saturday, 29 October 2016

Place	Player	Score	To par
1	(Japan) Hideki Matsuyama	66-65-68=199	−17
2	(Scotland) Russell Knox	66-68-68=202	−14
3	(United States) Daniel Berger	66-70-67=203	−13
T4	(United States) Bill Haas	67-67-70=204	−12
T4	(Italy) Francesco Molinari	67-69-68=204	−12
T6	(England) Ross Fisher	69-68-69=206	−10
T6	(United States) Rickie Fowler	65-73-68=206	−10
T8	(United States) Matt Kuchar	73-66-68=207	−9
T8	(Republic of Ireland) Shane Lowry	74-68-65=207	−9
T8	(Northern Ireland) Rory McIlroy	71-66-70=207	−9
T8	(Belgium) Thomas Pieters	71-70-66=207	−9
T8	(Sweden) Henrik Stenson	69-71-67=207	−9
T8	(China) Zhang Xinjun	68-69-70=207	−9

=== Final round ===
Sunday, 30 October 2016

Place	Player	Score	To par	Prize money (US$)
1	(Japan) Hideki Matsuyama	66-65-68-66=265	−23	1,620,000
T2	(United States) Daniel Berger	66-70-67-69=272	−16	787,000
T2	(Sweden) Henrik Stenson	69-71-67-65=272	−16	787,000
T4	(United States) Bill Haas	67-67-70-69=273	−15	372,000
T4	(Northern Ireland) Rory McIlroy	71-66-70-66=273	−15	372,000
T6	(England) Ross Fisher	69-68-69-68=274	−14	235,333
T6	(United States) Rickie Fowler	65-73-68-68=274	−14	235,333
T6	(Italy) Francesco Molinari	67-69-68-70=274	−14	235,333
T9	(Spain) Sergio García	68-72-69-67=276	−12	170,000
T9	(Scotland) Russell Knox	66-68-68-74=276	−12	170,000

==== Scorecard ====
Birdie	Bogey

Hole	1	2	3	4	5	6	7	8	9	10	11	12	13	14	15	16	17	18
Par	4	5	4	3	4	3	4	5	4	4	4	3	4	5	4	4	3	5
(Japan) Matsuyama	−18	−18	−18	−18	−19	−19	−20	−20	−20	−20	−20	−20	−21	−22	−23	−23	−23	−23
(United States) Berger	−13	−13	−14	−15	−15	−15	−16	−16	−16	−15	−15	−15	−15	−15	−15	−16	−16	−16
(Sweden) Stenson	−9	−10	−11	−11	−12	−12	−13	−13	−13	−13	−14	−14	−14	−15	−15	−15	−15	−16
(United States) Haas	−12	−12	−13	−13	−13	−14	−14	−14	−14	−14	−14	−14	−14	−15	−14	−14	−14	−15
(Northern Ireland) McIlroy	−9	−10	−10	−10	−11	−11	−12	−11	−11	−11	−12	−12	−13	−14	−14	−15	−15	−15
(England) Fisher	−11	−12	−12	−12	−11	−11	−11	−11	−12	−12	−13	−13	−13	−14	−14	−14	−15	−14
(United States) Fowler	−10	−10	−10	−10	−10	−10	−10	−10	−11	−11	−11	−11	−12	−12	−13	−13	−13	−14
(Italy) Molinari	−12	−13	−13	−14	−14	−14	−14	−13	−13	−13	−12	−12	−12	−12	−13	−13	−13	−14
(Spain) García	−8	−8	−8	−9	−9	−10	−9	−9	−9	−10	−10	−10	−11	−12	−12	−12	−13	−12
(Scotland) Knox	−14	−15	−15	−15	−15	−15	−15	−14	−13	−12	−11	−12	−11	−11	−11	−12	−12	−12

Cumulative tournament scores, relative to par
