= Cameron Tringale =

American professional golfer (born 1987)

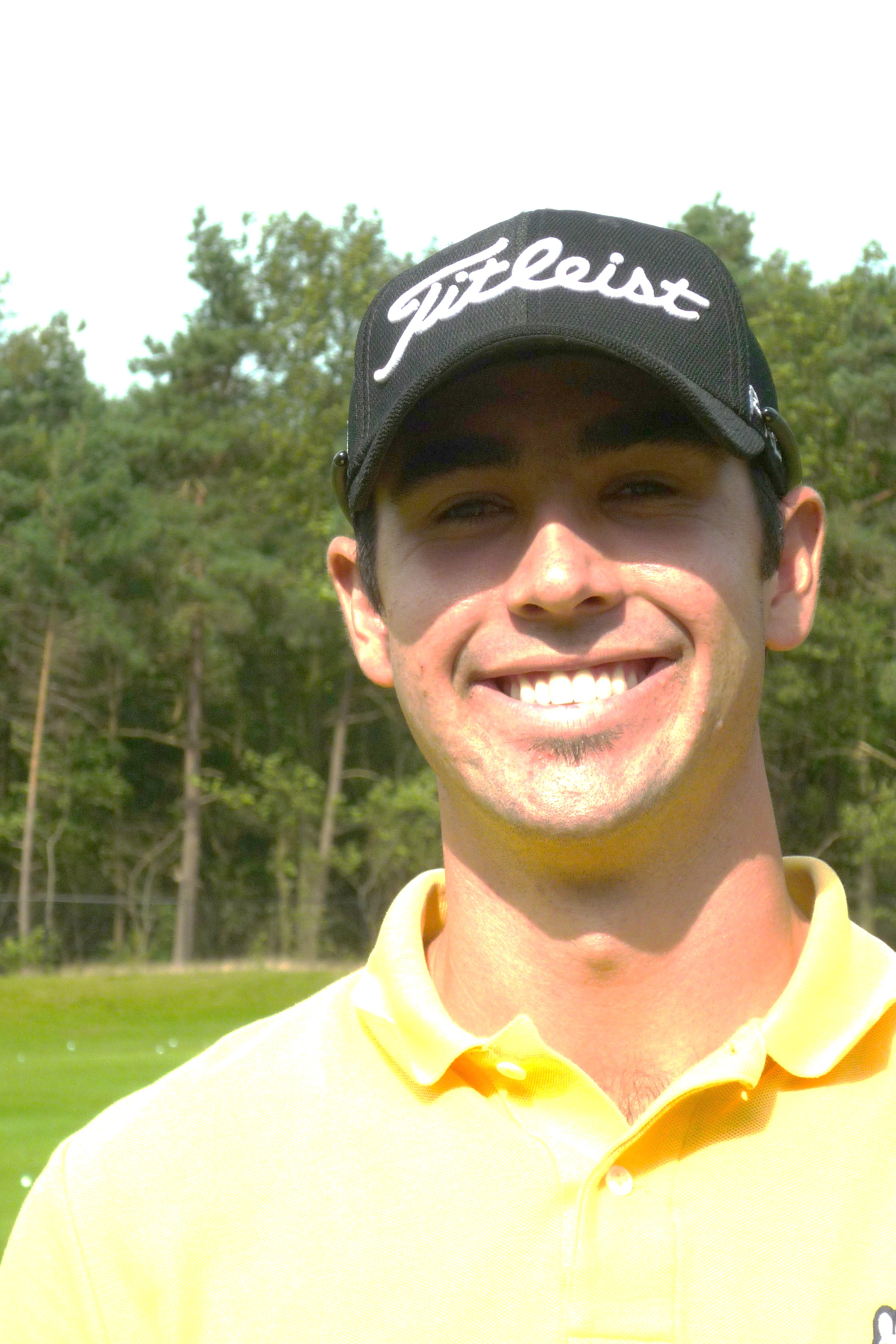
- Tringale at the 2010 KLM Open

Personal information
- Full name: Cameron Joseph Tringale
- Nationality: United States
- Born: August 24, 1987 (age 39) Mission Viejo, California, U.S.
- Height: 6 ft 2 in (1.88 m)
- Weight: 185 lb (84 kg; 13.2 st)

Career
- Sport: Golf
- College: Georgia Tech
- Turned professional: 2009
- Current tour: LIV Golf
- Former tour: PGA Tour
- Professional wins: 1
- Highest ranking: 44 (February 27, 2022) (as of October 25, 2026)

Best results in major championships
- Masters Tournament: T38: 2015
- PGA Championship: T41: 2022
- U.S. Open: T14: 2022
- The Open Championship: T26: 2021

Cameron Joseph Tringale (born August 24, 1987) is an American professional golfer. Born in Mission Viejo, California, Tringale was a three-time NCAA All-American at Georgia Tech. He was a member of the PGA Tour from 2010 until 2022, when he resigned his membership and joined LIV Golf.

== Amateur career ==
After graduating from Mission Viejo High School in 2005, Tringale attended Georgia Tech and won the Atlantic Coast Conference championship as a freshman. He played in the 2007 U.S. Amateur, where he lost his first round match. He qualified again in 2009 and reached the third round. Tringale was a three-time NCAA All-American, earning second-team honors in 2006 and 2007, and making the first team in 2009 as a senior. He qualified for the 2009 U.S. Open but missed the cut, and he represented the U.S. that year as a member of the Palmer Cup and Walker Cup teams.

== Professional career ==
In December 2009, Tringale successfully gained a 2010 PGA Tour card through qualifying school, finishing T19. He made his debut as a member of the PGA Tour at the 2010 Sony Open in Hawaii in January. In 21 starts that season, Tringale made just more than $300,000, leaving him 176th on the money list. His best finishes were ties for 11th at the Viking Classic and the Justin Timberlake Shriners Hospitals for Children Open.

In December, Tringale regained his PGA Tour card for 2011 by finishing fourth at Q-School. That season he collected fourth-place finishes at the Greenbrier Classic and CIMB Classic and a fifth at the Texas Open.

He finished fourth at the 2012 Farmers Insurance Open, seventh at the Zurich Classic of New Orleans and eighth at the Shell Houston Open. His best result in 2013 was third at the Tampa Bay Championship.

In the 2014 PGA Tour season, Tringale finished fourth at the Houston Open and Greenbrier Classic. Six days after the 2014 PGA Championship, Tringale disqualified himself after he realized he signed an incorrect scorecard. He originally finished T33. During the playoffs, he tied for second at The Barclays.

Tringale was runner-up at the 2015 Zurich Classic of New Orleans.

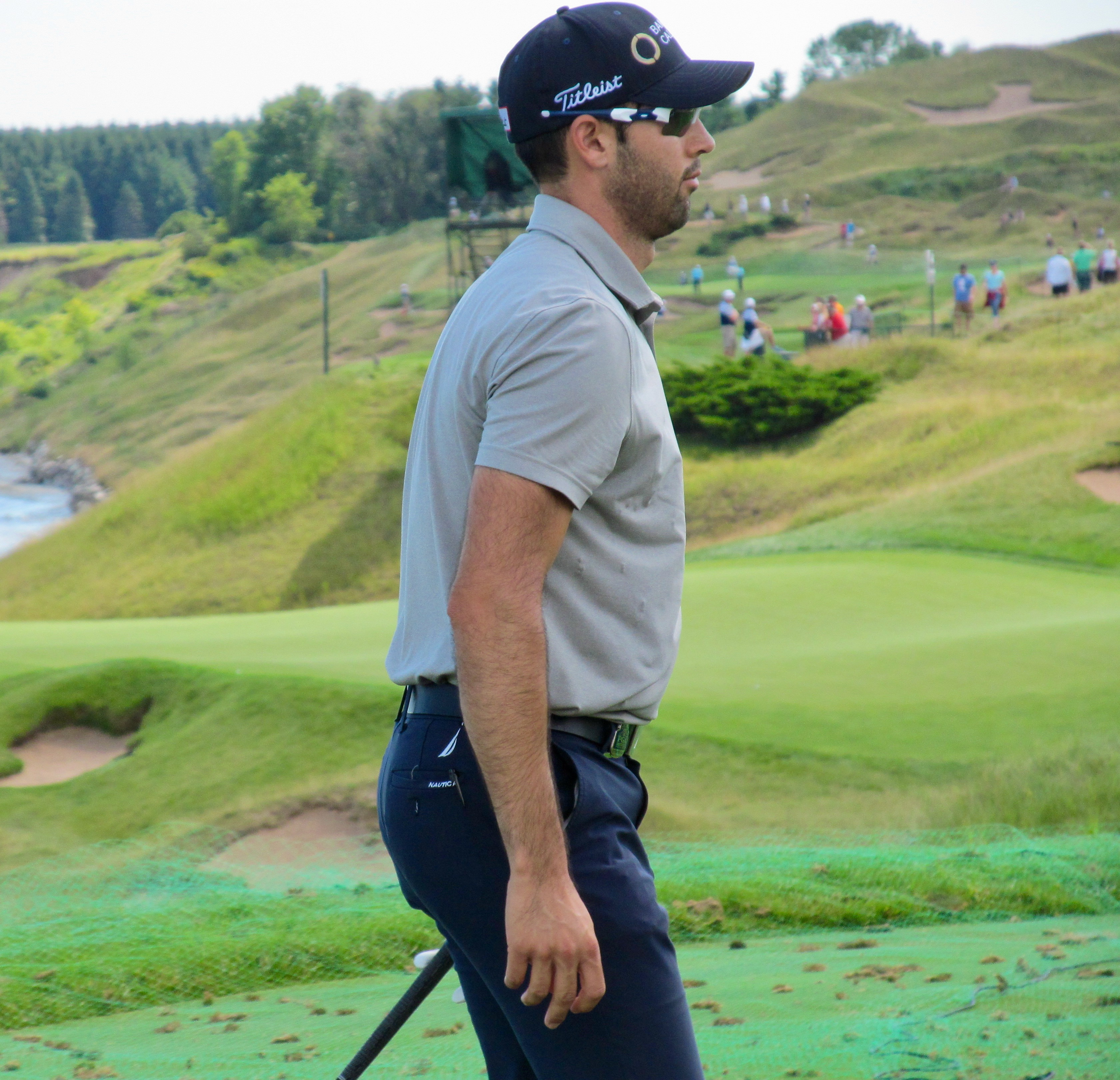
Tringale at the 2015 PGA Championship

In August 2022, Tringale announced that he had resigned from the PGA Tour and joined LIV Golf; he held the record for the highest career earnings on the tour without a tournament victory.

== Personal life ==
Tringale is married to Tasha Tringale. Tringale is a Christian. Tringale sponsors a child through Compassion International. He has also made other donations to the charity from his golf winnings.

== Professional wins (1) ==
=== Other wins (1) ===
No.	Date	Tournament	Winning score	Margin of victory	Runners-up
1	Dec 13, 2014	Franklin Templeton Shootout (with (Australia) Jason Day)	−32 (55-64-65=184)	1 stroke	(United States) Harris English and (United States) Matt Kuchar

== Results in major championships ==
Results not in chronological order in 2020.

Tournament	2009	2010	2011	2012	2013	2014	2015	2016	2017	2018
Masters Tournament							T38			
U.S. Open	CUT						T54			
The Open Championship						CUT	T58			
PGA Championship			CUT	72		DQ	CUT	84		

Tournament	2019	2020	2021	2022
Masters Tournament				
PGA Championship		DQ	CUT	T41
U.S. Open				T14
The Open Championship		NT	T26	T62

Did not play

CUT = missed the half-way cut
DQ = Disqualified
"T" = tied
NT = No tournament due to COVID-19 pandemic

=== Summary ===
Tournament	Wins	2nd	3rd	Top-5	Top-10	Top-25	Events	Cuts made
Masters Tournament	0	0	0	0	0	0	1	1
PGA Championship	0	0	0	0	0	0	8	3
U.S. Open	0	0	0	0	0	1	3	2
The Open Championship	0	0	0	0	0	0	4	3
Totals	0	0	0	0	0	1	16	9

- Most consecutive cuts made – 4 (2021 Open Championship – 2022 Open Championship, current)
- Longest streak of top-10s – 0

== Results in The Players Championship ==
Tournament	2012	2013	2014	2015	2016	2017	2018	2019	2020	2021	2022
The Players Championship	72	CUT	CUT	T56	T16	T35			C	CUT	CUT

Did not play

CUT = missed the halfway cut
"T" indicates a tie for a place
C = Canceled after the first round due to the COVID-19 pandemic

== Results in World Golf Championships ==
Tournament	2015	2016	2017	2018	2019	2020	2021	2022
Championship	T38							
Match Play						NT^{1}		T35
Invitational								
Champions						NT^{1}	NT^{1}	NT^{1}

^{1}Cancelled due to COVID-19 pandemic

Did not play

"T" = Tied
NT = No tournament
Note that the Championship and Invitational were discontinued from 2022.

== U.S. national team appearances ==
Amateur

- Palmer Cup: 2009
- Walker Cup: 2009 (winners)

== See also ==
- 2009 PGA Tour Qualifying School graduates
- 2010 PGA Tour Qualifying School graduates
- 2017 Web.com Tour Finals graduates
- 2018 Web.com Tour Finals graduates
