= Morgan Hoffmann =

American professional golfer (born 1989)

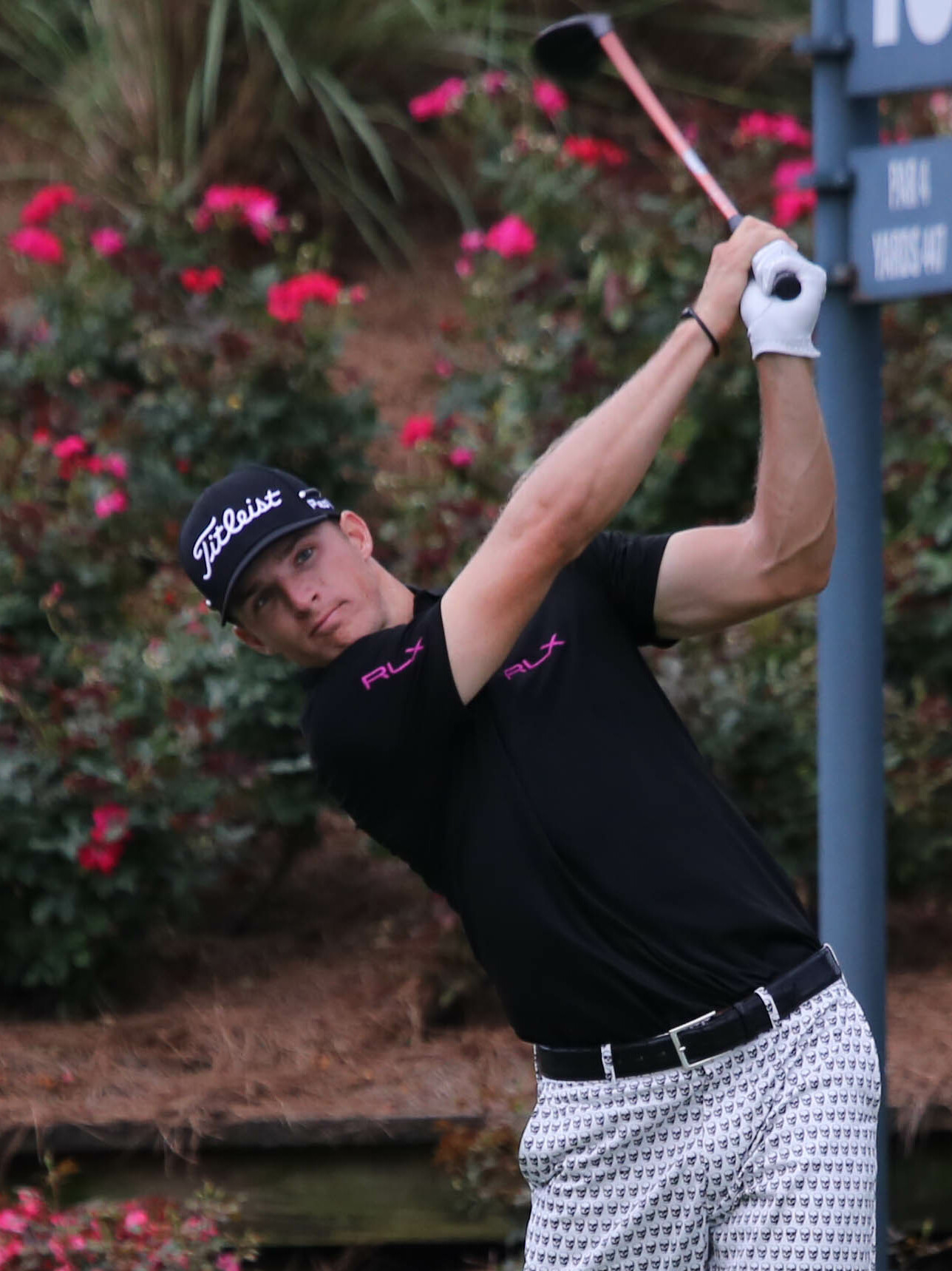
- Hoffmann at the 2014 Players Championship

Personal information
- Nationality: United States
- Born: August 11, 1989 (age 37) Franklin Lakes, New Jersey, U.S.
- Height: 6 ft 0 in (1.83 m)
- Weight: 180 lb (82 kg; 13 st)

Career
- Sport: Golf
- College: Oklahoma State University
- Turned professional: 2011
- Current tour: PGA Tour
- Former tour: Web.com Tour
- Highest ranking: 84 (April 26, 2015)

Best results in major championships
- Masters Tournament: T28: 2015
- PGA Championship: T75: 2015
- U.S. Open: T27: 2015
- The Open Championship: CUT: 2015

Achievements and awards
- PGA Tour Courage Award: 2020–21

Morgan Hoffmann (born August 11, 1989) is an American professional golfer.

== Biography ==
Raised in Ringwood, New Jersey, Hoffmann attended Ramapo High School. After winning two consecutive New Jersey state championships, Hoffmann relocated to the International Junior Golf Academy in Hilton Head, South Carolina to take advantage of the warm-weather and training opportunities. Hoffmann's girlfriend is Chelsea Colvard. They met while she was living in Miami through mutual Oklahoma State University friends.

Hoffmann spent two years attending Oklahoma State University where he played on the golf team. As a highly rated amateur, he held the number one spot in the World Amateur Golf Ranking for a time in 2009, and played in that year's Walker Cup.

After playing in the 2010 U.S. Open, Hoffmann decide to leave college early in order to turn professional. He qualified for his first professional major at the 2012 U.S. Open, finishing in a tie for 29th.

Hoffmann has been a resident of Saddle Brook, New Jersey.

Hoffmann played on the Web.com Tour in 2012, starting the season with no status and getting by on sponsor exemptions and Monday qualifiers. He played in 13 events and finished 19th on the money list, which earned him a promotion to the PGA Tour. In 2017, Hoffmann finished T2 at The Honda Classic, which is his highest finish in his career.

In December 2017, Hoffmann announced that he had been diagnosed with facioscapulohumeral muscular dystrophy (FSHD). In the days afterwards, Hoffmann was inundated and overwhelmed by messages of support from his fellow pros and members of the public. In April 2022, Hoffman returned after undergoing treatment, and competed on the PGA Tour for the first time in three years.

== Playoff record ==
Web.com Tour playoff record (0–1)

No.	Year	Tournament	Opponents	Result
1	2012	Chiquita Classic	(United States) Patrick Cantlay, (United States) Russell Henley	Henley won with par on first extra hole

== Results in major championships ==
Tournament	2010	2011	2012	2013	2014	2015
Masters Tournament						T28
U.S. Open	CUT		T29	CUT		T27
The Open Championship						CUT
PGA Championship						T75

Did not play

CUT = missed the half-way cut
"T" = tied

== Results in World Golf Championships ==
Tournament	2015
Championship	T17
Match Play	
Invitational	
Champions	

Did not play

"T" = Tied

== U.S. national team appearances ==
Amateur

- Walker Cup: 2009 (winners)
- Palmer Cup: 2009

== See also ==
- 2012 Web.com Tour graduates
