= Bud Cauley =

American professional golfer (born 1990)

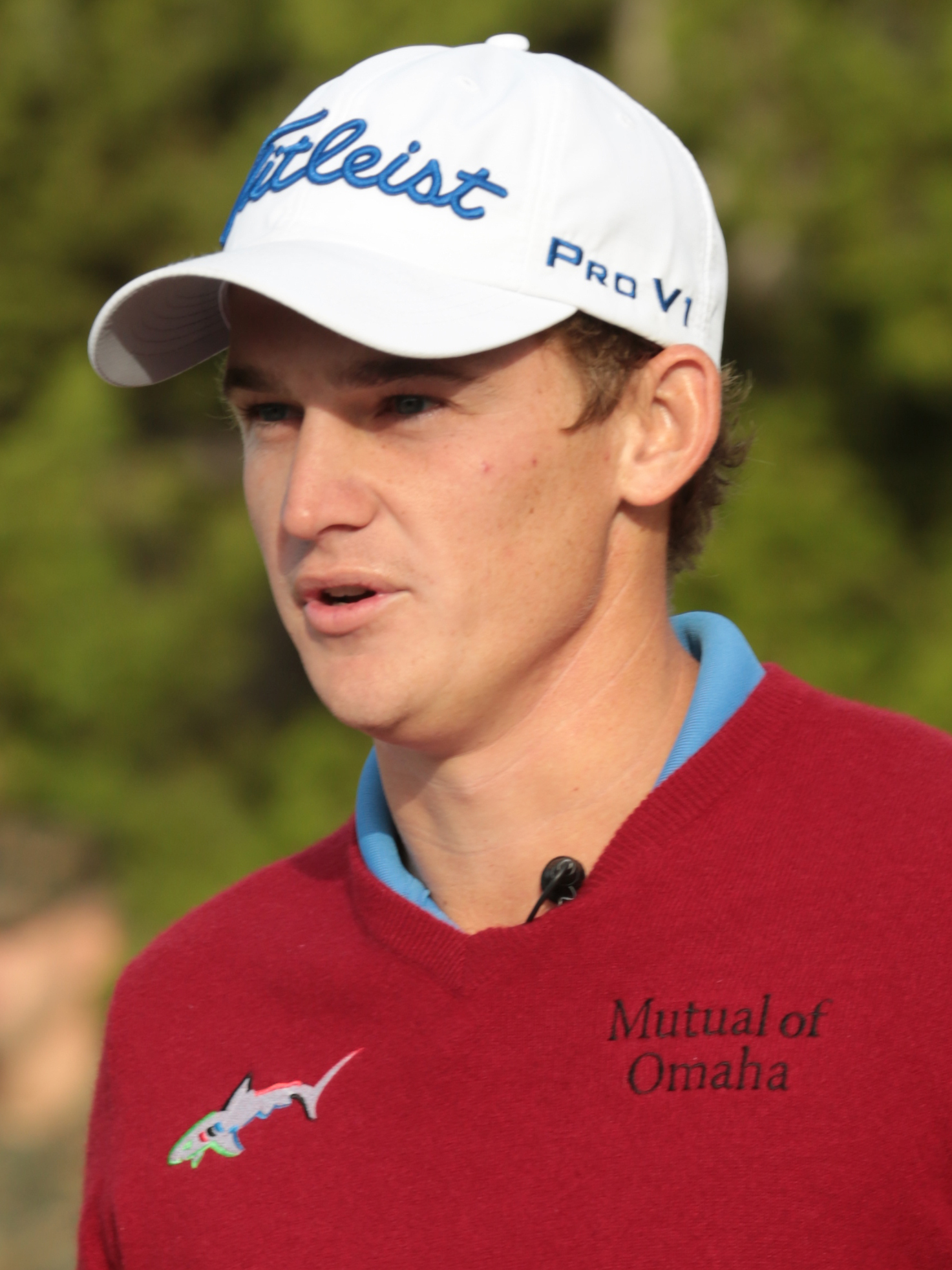
- Cauley in 2014

Personal information
- Full name: William Carl Cauley III
- Nationality: United States
- Born: March 16, 1990 (age 36) Daytona Beach, Florida, U.S.
- Height: 5 ft 7 in (1.70 m)
- Weight: 160 lb (73 kg; 11 st)

Career
- Sport: Golf
- College: University of Alabama
- Turned professional: 2011
- Current tour: PGA Tour
- Professional wins: 2
- Highest ranking: 38 (July 5, 2026)

Number of wins by tour
- PGA Tour: 1
- Korn Ferry Tour: 1

Best results in major championships
- Masters Tournament: DNP
- PGA Championship: T26: 2026
- U.S. Open: T56: 2026
- The Open Championship: T18: 2026

William Carl "Bud" Cauley III (born March 16, 1990) is an American professional golfer who plays on the PGA Tour.

== Early life ==
Cauley was born on March 16, 1990 in Daytona Beach, Florida, where he was home schooled by his parents. He was ranked top-five nationally in junior golf and among top 15 in the world. As a junior golfer, Cauley was a member of the 2006 Junior Ryder Cup, and the 2008 USA Junior World Golf Championships team. He was also a co-medalist at the 2008 Toyota World Junior Amateur Championships. When Cauley moved up to amateur events he was ranked No. 1 in junior golf.

== Amateur career ==
Cauley played college golf for the University of Alabama golf team, where he became one of the best in the program's history. He was a three-time first-team Golfweek All-American during his three years at Alabama. He was also a finalist for the Hogan Award, given to the best college golfer, all three years at Alabama. Cauley was a member of the 2009 U.S. Walker Cup team, where he posted a 3-0-1 record. In 2009, Cauley was the Southeastern Conference's Freshman of the Year. That year he captured his first collegiate victory at the United States Collegiate Championship. In 2008 he won the Players Amateur, qualifying him for the 2010 Verizon Heritage on the PGA Tour. He played in the 2009 and 2010 U.S. Amateur; in 2009 Cauley beat the world's No. 1 amateur, Rickie Fowler, in the first round of match play. He also won the Terra Cotta Invitational in 2008.

== Professional career ==
After finishing his junior year at Alabama, Cauley qualified for the 2011 U.S. Open and turned professional, foregoing his senior season. He made the cut at the U.S. Open, finishing T63 and guaranteeing a bypass to the second stage of Q School. Cauley made seven cuts in eight PGA Tour starts that year, including a T4 at the Viking Classic and solo third at the Frys.com Open, earning a total of $735,150. He finished the equivalent of 116th on the 2011 money list, joining Gary Hallberg, Scott Verplank, Phil Mickelson, Justin Leonard, Ryan Moore, and Tiger Woods as those who avoided Q school and went directly to the PGA Tour after college.

In 2012, Cauley had four top-10 finishes; he was in the top 100 in the Official World Golf Ranking by the end of July of that year.

In 2013, Cauley made only 10 cuts in 24 events. He played in the Web.com Tour Finals and finished 18th to retain his PGA Tour card for 2014.

In June 2018, Cauley suffered five broken ribs, a broken left leg and a collapsed lung in car crash in Dublin, Ohio. In October 2018, Cauley returned to golf and he played some events over the next two years. However, he developed medical complications in September 2020. He did not play professionally until a Korn Ferry Tour event in January 2024.

In June 2026, Cauley won the RBC Canadian Open for his first PGA Tour victory in his 239th start.

== Professional wins (2) ==
=== PGA Tour wins (1) ===
No.	Date	Tournament	Winning score	Margin of victory	Runner-up
1	Jun 14, 2026	RBC Canadian Open	−17 (69-63-66-65=263)	2 strokes	(England) Matt Fitzpatrick

=== Web.com Tour wins (1) ===
Legend
Finals event (1)
Other Web.com Tour (0)

No.	Date	Tournament	Winning score	Margin of victory	Runner-up
1	Aug 31, 2014	Hotel Fitness Championship	−20 (66-70-67-65=268)	1 stroke	(United States) Colt Knost

== Results in major championships ==
Results not in chronological order in 2020.

Tournament	2011	2012	2013	2014	2015	2016	2017	2018
Masters Tournament								
U.S. Open	T63						CUT	
The Open Championship			T32					
PGA Championship		CUT					T33	

Tournament	2019	2020	2021	2022	2023	2024	2025	2026
Masters Tournament								
PGA Championship		T37					T72	T26
U.S. Open							CUT	T56
The Open Championship		NT					CUT	T18

Did not play

CUT = missed the half-way cut
"T" = tied for place
NT = no tournament due to COVID-19 pandemic

=== Summary ===
Tournament	Wins	2nd	3rd	Top-5	Top-10	Top-25	Events	Cuts made
Masters Tournament	0	0	0	0	0	0	0	0
PGA Championship	0	0	0	0	0	0	5	4
U.S. Open	0	0	0	0	0	0	4	2
The Open Championship	0	0	0	0	0	1	3	2
Totals	0	0	0	0	0	1	12	8

- Most consecutive cuts made – 3 (twice, current)

== Results in The Players Championship ==
Tournament	2012	2013	2014	2015	2016	2017	2018	2019
The Players Championship	CUT	CUT					CUT	T47

Tournament	2020	2021	2022	2023	2024	2025	2026
The Players Championship	C					T6	T32

Top 10
Did not play

CUT = missed the halfway cut
"T" indicates a tie for a place C = canceled after the first round due to the COVID-19 pandemic

== U.S. national team appearances ==
Amateur

- Junior Ryder Cup: 2006
- Palmer Cup: 2009
- Walker Cup: 2009 (winners)

== See also ==
- 2013 Web.com Tour Finals graduates
- 2014 Web.com Tour Finals graduates
