= 2015 in golf =

This article summarizes the highlights of professional and amateur golf in the year 2015.

== Men's professional golf ==
Major championships

- 9–12 April: The Masters – Jordan Spieth won by four strokes over Phil Mickelson and Justin Rose. It was his first major victory. He also tied the Tiger Woods' tournament record of 270 (−18)
- 18–21 June: U.S. Open – Jordan Spieth won by one stroke when Dustin Johnson failed to make birdie at the 18th hole. He became the sixth player ever to win the Masters and U.S. Open in the same year.
- 16–19 July: The Open Championship – Zach Johnson won in a 4-hole aggregate playoff, when Louis Oosthuizen failed to make his putt on the 4th and final hole of the playoff. It was Johnson's first Open Championship victory, and his second major victory.
- 13–16 August: PGA Championship – Jason Day won his first major by three strokes over Jordan Spieth. Day played consistently during the final round, never allowing Spieth an opportunity to get closer than 3 strokes, while setting a record for a major at 20 under par, besting Tiger Woods' previous record of 19 under at the 2000 British Open.

World Golf Championships

- 5–8 March WGC-Cadillac Championship – Dustin Johnson won by one stroke over J. B. Holmes
- 29 April – 3 May: WGC-Cadillac Match Play – Rory McIlroy defeated Gary Woodland, 4 & 2, in the championship match. It was McIlroy's first WGC-Match Play championship, and his second WGC championship overall.
- 6–9 August: WGC-Bridgestone Invitational – Shane Lowry won by two strokes over Bubba Watson. It was his first WGC victory.
- 5–8 November: WGC-HSBC Champions – Russell Knox won by two strokes over Kevin Kisner. It was his first World Golf Championship victory, and also his first PGA Tour and European Tour victory.

FedEx Cup playoff events - see 2015 FedEx Cup Playoffs

- 27–30 August: The Barclays – Jason Day tied the tournament record and won by six strokes over Henrik Stenson.
- 4–7 September: Deutsche Bank Championship – Rickie Fowler won by one stroke over Henrik Stenson.
- 17–20 September: BMW Championship – Jason Day won his second FedEx Cup event of the season and moved to number one in the Official World Golf Ranking.
- 24–27 September: Tour Championship – Jordan Spieth won by three strokes over Danny Lee, Justin Rose, and Henrik Stenson. The victory for him also won his first FedEx Cup.

Other leading PGA Tour events

- 7–10 May: The Players Championship – Rickie Fowler defeated Kevin Kisner and Sergio García in a three-hole aggregate playoff, eliminating García after the third hole, and eliminating Kisner on a sudden-death fourth hole. It was Fowler's first Players title.<

For a complete list of PGA Tour results see 2015 PGA Tour.

Leading European Tour events

- 21–24 May: BMW PGA Championship – An Byeong-hun won by six strokes over Thongchai Jaidee and Miguel Ángel Jiménez. It was his first European Tour victory.
- 29 October – 1 November: Turkish Airlines Open – Victor Dubuisson won by one stroke over Jaco van Zyl.
- 12–15 November: BMW Masters – Kristoffer Broberg won in a playoff over Patrick Reed, with a birdie on the first extra hole. It was his first European Tour victory.
- 19–22 November: DP World Tour Championship, Dubai – Rory McIlroy won by one stroke over Andy Sullivan, clinching the Race to Dubai title. It was his second Tour Championship victory, and his third Race to Dubai title.

For a complete list of European Tour results see 2015 European Tour.

Team events

- 8–11 October: Presidents Cup – The U.S. team won, 15 1/2–14 1/2, for the sixth straight time.

Tour leaders

- PGA Tour – (United States) Jordan Spieth (US$12,030,465)
  - This total does not include FedEx Cup bonuses.
- European Tour – (Northern Ireland) Rory McIlroy (4,727,253 points)
  - This total does not include the US$1.875 million bonus for winning the Race to Dubai.
- Japan Golf Tour – (South Korea) Kim Kyung-tae (¥165,981,625)
- Asian Tour – (India) Anirban Lahiri (US$1,139,084)
- PGA Tour of Australasia – (Australia) Nathan Holman (A$346,702)
- Sunshine Tour – (South Africa) George Coetzee (R 5,470,684)

Awards

- PGA Tour
  - FedEx Cup – (United States) Jordan Spieth
  - PGA Player of the Year – (United States) Jordan Spieth
  - Player of the Year (Jack Nicklaus Trophy) – (United States) Jordan Spieth
  - Leading money winner (Arnold Palmer Award) – (United States) Jordan Spieth
  - Vardon Trophy – (United States) Jordan Spieth
  - Byron Nelson Award – (United States) Jordan Spieth
  - Rookie of the Year – (United States) Daniel Berger
  - Payne Stewart Award – (South Africa) Ernie Els
- European Tour
  - Golfer of the Year – (Northern Ireland) Rory McIlroy
  - Rookie of the Year – (South Korea) An Byeong-hun
- Web.com Tour
  - Player of the Year – (United States) Patton Kizzire

Results from other tours

- 2015 Asian Development Tour
- 2015 Asian Tour
- 2015 PGA Tour of Australasia
- 2015 Challenge Tour
- 2015 Japan Golf Tour
- 2015 Korean Tour
- 2015 OneAsia Tour
- 2015 PGA Tour Canada
- 2015 PGA Tour China
- 2015 PGA Tour Latinoamérica
- 2015 Sunshine Tour
- 2015 Web.com Tour

Other happenings

- 15 July: The board of the Official World Golf Ranking approved the addition of the PGA EuroPro Tour, Pro Golf Tour, Alps Tour, and Nordic Golf League into the world rankings. The new scoring begins after the 2015 Open Championship and brings the number of tours that receive ranking points to 18.
- 16 August: Jordan Spieth becomes the number one golfer in the world.
- 30 August: Rory McIlroy regains the world number one ranking.
- 8 September: Spieth regains the world number one ranking.
- 14 September: McIlroy regains the world number one ranking.
- 21 September: Jason Day gains the world number one ranking for the first time, resulting from his victory at the BMW Championship.
- 28 September: Spieth regains the world number one ranking.
- 18 October: Day regains the world number one ranking.
- 8 November: Spieth regains the world number one ranking.

== Women's professional golf ==
LPGA majors

- 2–5 April: ANA Inspiration – Brittany Lincicome defeated Stacy Lewis on the third playoff hole. It is her second ANA Inspiration victory.
- 11–14 June: KPMG Women's PGA Championship – Inbee Park won by five strokes over Kim Sei-young. It was her third consecutive Women's PGA Championship victory, and her sixth major victory overall. She also set a tournament record relative to par, at −19.
- 9–12 July: U.S. Women's Open – Chun In-gee won by one stroke over Amy Yang, for her first major victory.
- 30 July – 2 August: Women's British Open – Inbee Park won by three strokes over Ko Jin-young. It was her first Women's British Open victory, and her seventh major victory overall.
- 10–13 September: The Evian Championship – Lydia Ko won by six strokes over Lexi Thompson. It was her first major championship, and in the process she became, at age 18, the youngest person of either sex ever to win a professional major championship.

For a complete list of LPGA Tour results, see 2015 LPGA Tour.

Additional LPGA Tour events

- 19–22 November: CME Group Tour Championship – Cristie Kerr won by one stroke over Jang Ha-na and Gerina Piller, while Lydia Ko won the season-long Race to the CME Globe.

Ladies European Tour event

- 9–12 December: Omega Dubai Ladies Masters – Shanshan Feng won by 12 strokes.

For a complete list of Ladies European Tour results see 2015 Ladies European Tour.

Team events

- 18–20 September: Solheim Cup – Team USA won the Cup for the first time since 2009, with a 14½–13½ victory over Team Europe. Team USA won 8½ of the 12 available points in the singles matches to clinch the Cup.

Money list leaders

- LPGA Tour – (New Zealand) Lydia Ko (US$2,800,802)
- LPGA of Japan Tour – (South Korea) Lee Bo-mee (¥230,497,057)
- Ladies European Tour – (China) Shanshan Feng (€399,213)
- LPGA of Korea Tour – (South Korea) Chun In-gee (₩913,760,833)
- Ladies Asian Golf Tour – (Thailand) Kanphanitnan Muangkhumsakul (US$25,777)
- ALPG Tour – (Australia) Su-Hyun Oh (A$80,430) (2014/15 season)
- Symetra Tour – (United States) Annie Park (US$68,673)

Awards

- LPGA Tour Player of the Year – (New Zealand) Lydia Ko
- LPGA Tour Rookie of the Year – (South Korea) Sei Young Kim
- LPGA Tour Vare Trophy – (South Korea) Inbee Park
- LET Rookie of the Year – (Denmark) Emily Kristine Pedersen
- LPGA of Japan Tour Player of the Year – (South Korea) Lee Bo-mee

Other tour results

- 2015 Symetra Tour
- 2015 Ladies Asian Golf Tour
- 2015 LPGA of Japan Tour
- 2015 LPGA of Korea Tour

Other happenings

- 31 January – Lydia Ko took over the No. 1 spot in Women's World Golf Rankings following her runner-up finish at Coates Golf Championship.
- 14 June – Inbee Park took over the No. 1 spot in Women's World Golf Rankings following her win at KPMG Women's PGA Championship.
- 26 July – Chun In-gee won major championships on three ladies professional golf tours in one season: U.S. Women's Open of LPGA Tour, World Ladies Championship Salonpas Cup of LPGA of Japan Tour, and Hite Jinro Championship of LPGA of Korea Tour.
- 25 October – Ko took over the No. 1 spot in Women's World Golf Rankings following her win at Fubon LPGA Taiwan Championship.
- 15 November - South Korean Lee Bo-mee became the first player of LPGA of Japan Tour to earn more than 200 million yen in one season, following her win at Ito En Ladies Golf Tournament.
- 22 November - With her consecutive victory at Daio Paper Elleair Open, Lee Bo-mee earned more than 220 million yen in one season, and now has the record of the greatest amount of money earned in one season in Japan, both men and women, surpassing the record of Toshimitsu Izawa in 2001.

== Senior men's professional golf ==
Senior majors

- 14–17 May: Regions Tradition – Jeff Maggert won on the first playoff hole over Kevin Sutherland.
- 21–24 May: Senior PGA Championship – Colin Montgomerie won by four strokes. It is his third senior major championship, and his second straight Senior PGA Championship victory.
- 11–14 June: Senior Players Championship – Bernhard Langer won by six strokes over Kirk Triplett. It was his second consecutive Senior Players Championship victory, and his fifth senior major victory overall.
- 25–28 June: U.S. Senior Open – Jeff Maggert won by two strokes over Colin Montgomerie. It was his second senior major victory.
- 23–26 July: The Senior Open Championship – Marco Dawson won by one stroke over Bernhard Langer. It was Dawson's first major victory of any kind.

Full results

- 2015 Champions Tour
- 2015 European Senior Tour

Money list leaders

- Champions Tour – German Bernhard Langer topped the money list for the seventh time (fourth consecutive) with earnings of US$2,340,288.
- European Senior Tour – Colin Montgomerie won for the second consecutive season with earnings of €679,147.

Awards

- Champions Tour
  - Charles Schwab Cup – (Germany) Bernhard Langer
  - Player of the Year – (Germany) Bernhard Langer
  - Rookie of the Year – (United States) Jerry Smith
  - Leading money winner (Arnold Palmer Award) – (Germany) Bernhard Langer
  - Lowest stroke average (Byron Nelson Award) – (Germany) Bernhard Langer

== Amateur golf ==
- 15–18 January: Latin America Amateur Championship – Matías Domínguez of Chile won by one stroke over Alejandro Tosti of Argentina.
- 22–27 May: NCAA Division I Women's Golf Championships – Stanford won its first team title and Emma Talley of Alabama claimed the individual title.
- 29 May – 3 June: NCAA Division I Men's Golf Championships – LSU won its fifth team title and Bryson DeChambeau of SMU claimed the individual title.
- 9–13 June: British Ladies Amateur Golf Championship - Céline Boutier won 4 and 3 over Linnea Ström in the championship match.
- 15–20 June: The Amateur Championship – Romain Langasque won 4 & 2 over Grant Forrest in the championship match.
- 10–16 August: U.S. Women's Amateur – Hannah O'Sullivan defeated Sierra Brooks 3 & 2 in the championship match.
- 17–23 August: U.S. Amateur – Bryson DeChambeau won 7 & 6 over Derek Bard in the championship match.
- 12–13 September: Walker Cup – Great Britain and Ireland defeated the United States by a score of 16½ to 9½.
- 1–4 October: Asia-Pacific Amateur Championship – Chinese golfer Jin Cheng won by one stroke; before the start of the fourth round, it was decided that weather conditions were not suitable for play, so the tournament was called completed with 54 holes in the books.

== Golf in multi-sport events ==
- 3–6 June: Games of the Small States of Europe – Iceland swept the gold medals: men's individual (Kristján Einarsson), women's individual (Guðrún Björnsdóttir), men's team and women's team.
- 9–12 June: Southeast Asian Games – Thailand swept the gold medals: men's individual (Natipong Srithong), women's individual (Suthavee Chanachai), men's team and women's team.
- 8–11 July: Summer Universiade – Japan took the men's individual (Kazuki Higa) and team gold medals while South Korea took the women's individual (Lee Jeong-eun) and team golds.
- 15–18 July: Pacific Games – Papua New Guinea swept the gold medals: men's individual (Soti Dinki), women's individual (Kristine Seko), men's team and women's team.
- 16–19 July: Pan American Games – Colombian players won the three events: men's (Marcelo Rozo), women's (Mariajo Uribe) and mixed team (Rozo, Uribe, Mateo Gómez, Paola Moreno).

== Deaths ==
- 29 January – Kel Nagle (born 1920), Australian golfer with 81 professional wins, most notably winning the 1960 Open Championship.
- 3 February – Charlie Sifford (born 1922), first African American to join the PGA Tour.
- 7 February – Billy Casper (born 1931), American golfer who won 51 times on the PGA Tour, including three majors.
- 29 April – Calvin Peete (born 1943), African-American golfer with 12 PGA Tour wins.
- 1 May – Pete Brown (born 1935), first African-American golfer to win on the PGA Tour.
- 3 May – Warren Smith (born 1915), member of the PGA Golf Professional Hall of Fame.
- 23 May – Hugh Boyle (born 1936), Irish golfer on 1967 Ryder Cup team.
- 7 June – Sean Pappas (born 1966), South African golfer with 5 Sunshine Tour wins.
- 7 August – Louise Suggs (born 1923), American professional golfer and co-founder of the LPGA, with 61 LPGA Tour victories, including 11 major championships.
- 13 September – Howie Johnson (born 1925), American golfer who won twice on the PGA Tour.
- 6 October – Sandra Spuzich (born 1937), American golfer who won seven times on the LPGA Tour, including the 1966 U.S. Women's Open.
- 18 November – Dan Halldorson (born 1952), Canadian golfer who won once on the PGA Tour and seven times on the Canadian Tour.

== Table of results ==
This table summarizes all the results referred to above in date order.

| Dates | Tournament | Status or tour | Winner |
|---|---|---|---|
| 15–18 Jan | Latin America Amateur Championship | Amateur men's individual tournament | (Chile) Matías Domínguez |
| 5–8 Mar | WGC-Cadillac Championship | World Golf Championships | (United States) Dustin Johnson |
| 2–5 Apr | ANA Inspiration | LPGA major | (United States) Brittany Lincicome |
| 9–12 Apr | The Masters | Men's major | (United States) Jordan Spieth |
| 29 Apr – 3 May | WGC-Cadillac Match Play | World Golf Championships | (Northern Ireland) Rory McIlroy |
| 7–10 May | The Players Championship | PGA Tour | (United States) Rickie Fowler |
| 14–17 May | Regions Tradition | Senior major | (United States) Jeff Maggert |
| 21–24 May | BMW PGA Championship | European Tour | (South Korea) An Byeong-hun |
| 21–24 May | Senior PGA Championship | Senior major | (Scotland) Colin Montgomerie |
| 22–27 May | NCAA Division I Women's Golf Championships | U.S. college championship | Stanford / Emma Talley |
| 29 May – 3 Jun | NCAA Division I Men's Golf Championships | U.S. college championship | LSU / Bryson DeChambeau |
| 9–13 Jun | British Ladies Amateur Golf Championship | Amateur women's individual tournament | (France) Céline Boutier |
| 11–14 Jun | KPMG Women's PGA Championship | LPGA major | (South Korea) Inbee Park |
| 11–14 Jun | Constellation Senior Players Championship | Senior major | (Germany) Bernhard Langer |
| 15–20 Jun | The Amateur Championship | Amateur men's individual tournament | (France) Romain Langasque |
| 18–21 Jun | U.S. Open | Men's major | (United States) Jordan Spieth |
| 25–28 Jun | U.S. Senior Open | Senior major | (United States) Jeff Maggert |
| 9–12 Jul | U.S. Women's Open | LPGA major | (South Korea) Chun In-gee |
| 16–19 Jul | The Open Championship | Men's major | (United States) Zach Johnson |
| 23–26 Jul | The Senior Open Championship | Senior major | (United States) Marco Dawson |
| 30 Jul – 2 Aug | Ricoh Women's British Open | LPGA Tour and Ladies European Tour major | (South Korea) Inbee Park |
| 6–9 Aug | WGC-Bridgestone Invitational | World Golf Championships | (Republic of Ireland) Shane Lowry |
| 10–16 Aug | U.S. Women's Amateur | Amateur women's individual tournament | (United States) Hannah O'Sullivan |
| 13–16 Aug | PGA Championship | Men's major | (Australia) Jason Day |
| 17–23 Aug | U.S. Amateur | Amateur men's individual tournament | (United States) Bryson DeChambeau |
| 27–30 Aug | The Barclays | PGA Tour FedEx Cup playoff | (Australia) Jason Day |
| 4–7 Sep | Deutsche Bank Championship | PGA Tour FedEx Cup playoff | (United States) Rickie Fowler |
| 10–13 Sep | The Evian Championship | LPGA Tour and Ladies European Tour major | (New Zealand) Lydia Ko |
| 12–13 Sep | Walker Cup | Great Britain & Ireland v United States men's amateur team event | (United Kingdom) Great Britain & (Republic of Ireland) Ireland |
| 18–20 Sep | Solheim Cup | Europe v United States women's professional team event | United States |
| 17–20 Sep | BMW Championship | PGA Tour FedEx Cup playoff | (Australia) Jason Day |
| 24–27 Sep | The Tour Championship | PGA Tour FedEx Cup playoff | (United States) Jordan Spieth |
| 1–4 Oct | Asia-Pacific Amateur Championship | Amateur men's individual tournament | (China) Jin Cheng |
| 8–11 Oct | Presidents Cup | United States v. International team men's professional team event | (United States) U.S. team |
| 5–8 Nov | WGC-HSBC Champions | World Golf Championships | (Scotland) Russell Knox |
| 19–22 Nov | DP World Tour Championship, Dubai | European Tour | (Northern Ireland) Rory McIlroy |
| 19–22 Nov | CME Group Tour Championship | LPGA Tour | (United States) Cristie Kerr |

The following biennial events will next be played in 2016: Ryder Cup, EurAsia Cup, International Crown, Curtis Cup, Eisenhower Trophy, Espirito Santo Trophy.
