= Will Wilcox =

American professional golfer (born 1986)

Willy Wilcox
Personal information
- Nationality: United States
- Born: June 2, 1986 (age 40) Birmingham, Alabama, U.S.
- Height: 6 ft 1 in (1.85 m)
- Weight: 160 lb (73 kg; 11 st)

Career
- Sport: Golf
- College: University of Alabama at Birmingham; Clayton State University
- Turned professional: 2009
- Former tours: PGA Tour; Korn Ferry Tour; Canadian Tour; Hooters Tour
- Professional wins: 4

Number of wins by tour
- Korn Ferry Tour: 1
- Other: 3

Best results in major championships
- Masters Tournament: DNP
- PGA Championship: DNP
- U.S. Open: CUT: 2011
- The Open Championship: DNP

Willy Wilcox (born June 2, 1986) is an American professional golfer and member of the PGA Tour. He is also the caddie of PGA Tour golfer Im Sung-jae.

== Early life ==
Wilcox was born in Birmingham, Alabama. He grew up in Pell City, 35 miles east of Birmingham. His mother, Kim, an excellent golf player, attended Auburn University on an athletic scholarship, and became the head professional at Pine Harbor Country Club in Pell City.

== Amateur career ==
Wilcox played college golf at University of Alabama at Birmingham and Clayton State University He was a three-time All-American. He also won the 2008 Alabama Amateur.

== Professional career ==
In 2009, Wilcox turned professional and played on the Hooters Tour from 2009 to 2011, winning twice. He played on the Canadian Tour in 2010, winning once at the Dakota Dunes Casino Open and finishing fourth on the Order of Merit. He has played on the Web.com Tour since 2011 and won the 2013 South Georgia Classic.

On July 14, 2013, Wilcox became only the fourth professional golfer in Web.com Tour history to shoot 59 for a round. Wilcox's card had 10 birdies, seven pars, and an eagle for a 12-under score in the final round of the Utah Championship at Willow Creek CC in Sandy, Utah. He finished seventh on the 2013 Web.com Tour regular season money list to earn his 2014 PGA Tour card. He had two top-10 finishes in his first season on the PGA tour and finished 142nd in FedEx Cup points, which was good enough to retain his card for 2015.

Wilcox shot a final round 67 at the 2015 Barbasol Championship, where he finished solo second. Willy finished the 2015 PGA Tour in 97th place in the FedEx Cup points, qualified for the playoffs, and ended up ranked #2 in the PGA Tour's "All Around" statistics between Jason Day and Jordan Spieth.

Wilcox recorded the first hole-in-one (since 2002) on the famous 17th hole at the TPC at Sawgrass Stadium course during the 2016 Players Championship, but finished the season ranked 138th and missed the 2016 playoffs. Following the 2017 season, Wilcox lost his PGA Tour card after finishing 202nd. He has primarily played on the Web.com Tour since.

== Amateur wins ==
- 2008 Alabama Amateur

== Professional wins (4) ==
=== Web.com Tour wins (1) ===
No.	Date	Tournament	Winning score	Margin of victory	Runners-up
1	Apr 28, 2013	South Georgia Classic	−15 (71-66-63-73=273)	4 strokes	(United States) D. J. Brigman, (United States) Michael Putnam, (United States) Zack Sucher

=== Canadian Tour wins (1) ===
No.	Date	Tournament	Winning score	Margin of victory	Runner-up
1	Jun 11, 2010	Dakota Dunes Casino Open	−25 (68-65-64-66=263)	1 stroke	(United States) Brady Stockton

=== NGA Hooters Tour wins (2) ===
- 2010 Savannah Lakes Village Classic
- 2011 Terry Moore Ford Open

== Results in major championships ==
Tournament	2011
U.S. Open	CUT

CUT = missed the half-way cut
Note: Wilcox only played in the U.S. Open.

== See also ==
- 2013 Web.com Tour Finals graduates
- Lowest rounds of golf
