= 2015 FedEx Cup Playoffs =

Tournament information
- Dates: August 27 – September 27, 2015
- Location: Plainfield Country Club; TPC Boston; Conway Farms Golf Club; East Lake Golf Club
- Tour: PGA Tour

Statistics
- Field: 125 for The Barclays; 100 for Deutsche Bank Ch. 70 for BMW Championship; 30 for Tour Championship
- Prize fund: $35,000,000 bonus money
- Winner's share: $10,000,000 bonus money

Champion
- (United States) Jordan Spieth
- 3,800 points

The 2015 FedEx Cup Playoffs, the series of four golf tournaments that will determine the season champion on the U.S.-based PGA Tour, were played from August 27 to September 27. It included the following four events:

- The Barclays – Plainfield Country Club, Edison, New Jersey
- Deutsche Bank Championship – TPC Boston, Norton, Massachusetts
- BMW Championship – Conway Farms Golf Club, Lake Forest, Illinois
- Tour Championship – East Lake Golf Club, Atlanta, Georgia

These were the ninth FedEx Cup playoffs since their inception in 2007.

The point distributions can be seen here.

== Regular season rankings ==
Place	Player	Points	Events
1	(United States) Jordan Spieth	4,169	21
2	(Australia) Jason Day	2,459	16
3	(United States) Bubba Watson	2,407	15
4	(United States) Jimmy Walker	2,014	20
5	(England) Justin Rose	1,742	16
6	(United States) Robert Streb	1,720	26
7	(United States) Dustin Johnson	1,718	17
8	(United States) Patrick Reed	1,593	23
9	(Northern Ireland) Rory McIlroy	1,567	9
10	(New Zealand) Danny Lee	1,561	32

For the full list see here.

== The Barclays ==
The Barclays was played August 27–30. Of the 125 players eligible to play in the event, five did not enter: Rory McIlroy (ranked 9), Louis Oosthuizen (28), Sergio García (31), Francesco Molinari (99) and Retief Goosen (111). Of the 120 entrants, 72 made the second-round cut at 142 (+2).

Jason Day won by six strokes over Henrik Stenson and moved from second place to first place in the standings. The top 100 players in the points standings advanced to the Deutsche Bank Championship. This included eight players who were outside the top 100 prior to The Barclays: Zac Blair (ranked 106th to 45th), Spencer Levin (115 to 80), Jason Dufner (103 to 82), Carlos Ortiz (112 to 83), Mark Wilson (114 to 85), Luke Donald (119 to 87), Johnson Wagner (101 to 92) and Camilo Villegas (123 to 99). Eight players started the tournament within the top 100 but ended the tournament outside the top 100, ending their playoff chances: Pádraig Harrington (ranked 87th to 103rd), Greg Owen (90 to 104), John Peterson (93 to 105), Adam Scott (94 to 106), Adam Hadwin (95 to 107), Charl Schwartzel (96 to 108), John Huh (97 to 110) and Francesco Molinari (99 to 111).

					FedEx Cup rank	
Place	Player	Score	To par	Winnings ($)	After	Before
1	(Australia) Jason Day	68-68-63-62=261	−19	1,485,000	1	2
2	(Sweden) Henrik Stenson	68-66-67-66=267	−13	891,000	4	41
3	(United States) Bubba Watson	65-68-67-69=269	−11	561,000	3	3
T4	(United States) Zac Blair	69-68-67-66=270	−10	363,000	45	106
T4	(United States) Zach Johnson	69-65-67-69=270	−10	363,000	5	11
T6	(South Korea) Bae Sang-moon	69-67-63-72=271	−9	276,375	23	34
T6	(United States) Ryan Palmer	69-67-65-70=271	−9	276,375	33	56
T6	(United States) Daniel Summerhays	67-70-68-66=271	−9	276,375	40	66
T9	(United States) Jason Bohn	71-64-72-65=272	−8	231,000	24	33
T9	(United States) Dustin Johnson	70-70-67-65=272	−8	231,000	6	7

- Par 70 course

== Deutsche Bank Championship ==
The Deutsche Bank Championship was played September 4–7. Of the 100 players eligible to play in the event, Sergio García (ranked 43) and Will Wilcox (89) did not play. Of the 98 entrants, 75 made the second-round cut at 145 (+3).

Rickie Fowler won by one stroke over Henrik Stenson and moved into third place in the standings. The top 70 players in the points standings advanced to the BMW Championship. This included four players who were outside the top 70 prior to the Deutsche Bank Championship: Hunter Mahan (91 to 52), Keegan Bradley (71 to 63), Jerry Kelly (94 to 65), and William McGirt (88 to 68). Four players started the tournament within the top 70 but ended the tournament outside the top 70, ending their playoff chances: Marc Leishman (61 to 72), Jim Herman (64 to 74), Kevin Streelman (65 to 75) and Boo Weekley (70 to 76).

					FedEx Cup rank	
Place	Player	Score	To par	Winnings ($)	After	Before
1	(United States) Rickie Fowler	67-67-67-68=269	−15	1,485,000	3	22
2	(Sweden) Henrik Stenson	67-68-65-70=270	−14	891,000	4	4
3	(United States) Charley Hoffman	67-63-76-67=273	−11	561,000	6	17
T4	(United States) Jim Furyk	71-65-70-70=276	−8	311,025	9	11
T4	(Australia) Matt Jones	67-67-68-74=276	−8	311,025	33	57
T4	(United States) Hunter Mahan	69-73-64-70=276	−8	311,025	52	91
T4	(United States) Sean O'Hair	68-67-67-74=276	−8	311,025	38	66
T4	(United States) Patrick Reed	72-67-67-70=276	−8	311,025	10	12
T9	(United States) Jerry Kelly	71-66-68-72=277	−7	222,750	65	94
T9	(United States) Matt Kuchar	69-72-65-71=277	−7	222,750	20	27
T9	(United States) Daniel Summerhays	71-68-70-68=277	−7	222,750	26	40

- Par 71 course

== BMW Championship ==
The BMW Championship was played September 17–20, after a one-week break. All 70 players eligible to play in the event did so, and there was no cut.

Jason Day won by six strokes over Daniel Berger. The top 30 players in the points standings advanced to the Tour Championship. This included four players who were outside the top 30 prior to the BMW Championship: Daniel Berger (46 to 9), Scott Piercy (44 to 20), Kevin Na (34 to 27), and Harris English (32 to 30). Four players started the tournament within the top 30 but ended the tournament outside the top 30, ending their playoff chances: Daniel Summerhays (26 to 31), Russell Knox (29 to 34), Ben Martin (25 to 35) and Jason Bohn (28 to 40).

					FedEx Cup rank	
Place	Player	Score	To par	Winnings ($)	After	Before
1	(Australia) Jason Day	61-63-69-69=262	−22	1,485,000	1	1
2	(United States) Daniel Berger	65-64-70-69=268	−16	891,000	9	46
3	(United States) Scott Piercy	67-65-67-70=269	−15	561,000	20	44
T4	(United States) Rickie Fowler	69-66-66-69=270	−14	341,000	3	3
T4	(United States) J. B. Holmes	70-65-67-68=270	−14	341,000	17	19
T4	(Northern Ireland) Rory McIlroy	68-65-67-70=270	−14	341,000	11	17
T7	(United States) Dustin Johnson	71-62-68-70=271	−13	257,125	7	8
T7	(Japan) Hideki Matsuyama	72-63-70-66=271	−13	257,125	15	16
T7	(United States) Cameron Tringale	72-64-69-66=271	−13	257,125	36	55
T10	(United States) Kevin Na	65-66-70-71=272	−12	206,250	27	34
T10	(Sweden) Henrik Stenson	71-63-71-67=272	−12	206,250	4	4
T10	(United States) Bubba Watson	65-70-72-65=272	−12	206,250	5	5

- Par 71 course

== Reset points ==
The points were reset after the BMW Championship.

Place	Player	Points	Reset points	Events
1	(Australia) Jason Day	6,680	2,000	19
2	(United States) Jordan Spieth	4,392	1,800	24
3	(United States) Rickie Fowler	3,958	1,600	20
4	(Sweden) Henrik Stenson	3,632	1,440	15
5	(United States) Bubba Watson	3,609	1,280	18
6	(United States) Zach Johnson	2,464	1,120	24
7	(United States) Dustin Johnson	2,454	960	20
8	(United States) Charley Hoffman	2,364	800	27
9	(United States) Daniel Berger	2,320	640	30
10	(United States) Patrick Reed	2,205	480	26

== Tour Championship ==
The Tour Championship was played September 24–27. Of the 30 golfers qualified for the tournament, only Jim Furyk (wrist injury), did not play. There was no cut.

Jordan Spieth won the tournament and the FedEx Cup, beating Danny Lee, Justin Rose, and Henrik Stenson by four strokes.

					FedEx Cup rank	
Place	Player	Score	To par	Winnings ($)	After	Before
1	(United States) Jordan Spieth	68-66-68-69=271	−9	1,485,000	1	2
T2	(New Zealand) Danny Lee	69-72-69-65=275	−5	618,750	9	19
T2	(England) Justin Rose	70-68-71-66=275	−5	618,750	8	12
T2	(Sweden) Henrik Stenson	63-68-72-72=275	−5	618,750	2	4
T5	(England) Paul Casey	65-70-71-70=276	−4	302,500	13	22
T5	(United States) Dustin Johnson	69-72-71-64=276	−4	302,500	7	7
T5	(United States) Bubba Watson	70-71-68-67=276	−4	302,500	5	5
T8	(United States) J. B. Holmes	68-72-68-69=277	−3	255,750	14	17
T8	(United States) Zach Johnson	66-70-71-70=277	−3	255,750	6	6
T10	(Australia) Jason Day	69-71-70-68=278	−2	228,525	3	1
T10	(United States) Matt Kuchar	71-70-69-68=278	−2	228,525	19	21

- Par 70 course

== Final leaderboard ==
Place	Player	Points	Winnings ($)
1	(United States) Jordan Spieth	3,800	10,000,000
2	(Sweden) Henrik Stenson	2,307	3,000,000
3	(Australia) Jason Day	2,290	2,000,000
4	(United States) Rickie Fowler	1,838	1,500,000
5	(United States) Bubba Watson	1,680	1,000,000
6	(United States) Zach Johnson	1,450	800,000
7	(United States) Dustin Johnson	1,360	700,000
8	(England) Justin Rose	1,235	600,000
9	(New Zealand) Danny Lee	1,123	550,000
10	(United States) Charley Hoffman	992	500,000

For the full list see here.

== Table of qualifying players ==
Table key:

Win
Top-10 finish
Did not advance to next tournament
Played way into next tournament

	Player	Pre-Playoffs		The Barclays		Deutsche Bank		BMW Champ.		Reset points	Tour Champ.	
	Player	Points	Rank	Finish	Rank after	Finish	Rank after	Finish	Rank after	Reset points	Finish	Final rank
(United States)	Jordan Spieth	4,169	1	CUT	2	CUT	2	T13	2	1,800	1	1
(Australia)	Jason Day	2,459	2	1	1	T12	1	1	1	2,000	T10	3
(United States)	Bubba Watson	2,407	3	3	3	T29	5	T10	5	1,280	T5	5
(United States)	Jimmy Walker	2,014	4	T69	7	CUT	11	T32	13	352	T18	T16
(England)	Justin Rose	1,742	5	T16	8	CUT	13	T13	12	368	T2	8
(United States)	Robert Streb	1,720	6	T39	9	T39	12	T23	14	336	T18	18
(United States)	Dustin Johnson	1,718	7	T9	6	T44	8	T7	7	960	T5	7
(United States)	Patrick Reed	1,593	8	T62	12	T4	10	T28	10	480	27	12
(Northern Ireland)	Rory McIlroy	1,567	9	DNP	15	T29	17	T4	11	384	T16	15
(New Zealand)	Danny Lee	1,561	10	T30	10	T33	14	T47	19	256	T2	9
(United States)	Zach Johnson	1,559	11	T4	5	T22	7	T13	6	1,120	T8	6
(United States)	Brooks Koepka*	1,544	12	CUT	16	CUT	21	T49	25	208	T18	24
(United States)	Brandt Snedeker	1,537	13	CUT	18	T44	18	66	23	224	T22	23
(United States)	Charley Hoffman	1,512	14	T62	17	3	6	T53	8	800	T22	10
(United States)	Rickie Fowler	1,498	15	CUT	22	1	3	T4	3	1,600	T12	4
(United States)	J. B. Holmes	1,484	16	T58	19	T44	19	T4	17	288	T8	14
(United States)	Kevin Kisner	1,416	17	T20	13	T12	15	T41	18	272	28	21
(United States)	Jim Furyk	1,401	18	T11	11	T4	9	WD	16	304	DNP	29
(England)	Paul Casey	1,389	19	T39	21	WD	24	T23	22	232	T5	13
(Japan)	Hideki Matsuyama	1,374	20	T13	14	T25	16	T7	15	320	T12	T16
(Sweden)	David Lingmerth	1,305	21	CUT	26	CUT	31	T49	37	–	–	37
(Australia)	Steven Bowditch	1,287	22	T13	20	CUT	22	T41	24	216	T12	20
(United States)	Bill Haas	1,281	23	T53	25	T60	27	T19	26	200	26	27
(United States)	Ben Martin	1,217	24	68	29	T25	25	T68	35	–	–	35
(United States)	Ryan Moore	1,208	25	CUT	31	CUT	39	T28	39	–	–	39
(United States)	Matt Kuchar	1,164	26	T39	27	T9	20	T41	21	240	T10	19
(United States)	Scott Piercy	1,127	27	T62	34	CUT	44	3	20	248	25	22
(South Africa)	Louis Oosthuizen	1,088	28	DNP	38	T12	30	T19	29	176	WD	30
(United States)	Chris Kirk	1,087	29	CUT	39	T29	37	T60	44	–	–	44
(United States)	Kevin Na	1,062	30	T20	28	T60	34	T10	27	192	T16	25
(Spain)	Sergio García	1,051	31	DNP	43	DNP	54	T39	53	–	–	53
(United States)	Gary Woodland	1,037	32	CUT	44	T12	36	T60	41	–	–	41
(United States)	Jason Bohn	1,037	33	T9	24	CUT	28	T64	40	–	–	40
(South Korea)	Bae Sang-moon	1,025	34	T6	23	T39	23	T53	28	184	T18	26
(United States)	James Hahn	1,012	35	T58	42	CUT	53	T32	51	–	–	51
(United States)	Justin Thomas*	1,007	36	T16	30	T56	35	T13	32	–	–	32
(United States)	Shawn Stefani	987	37	T39	36	T65	45	59	54	–	–	54
(United States)	Russell Henley	986	38	72	49	CUT	58	T49	63	–	–	63
(United States)	Tony Finau*	985	39	T16	32	CUT	41	T47	43	–	–	43
(United States)	Webb Simpson	953	40	T30	37	T44	42	T64	48	–	–	48
(Sweden)	Henrik Stenson	952	41	2	4	2	4	T10	4	1,440	T2	2
(United States)	Harris English	932	42	T30	41	T12	32	T19	30	168	T22	28
(United States)	Troy Merritt	930	43	T53	48	T39	47	T62	56	–	–	56
(Scotland)	Russell Knox	914	44	T20	35	T12	29	T45	34	–	–	34
(United States)	Billy Horschel	903	45	CUT	53	72	67	T32	66	–	–	66
(United States)	Daniel Berger*	899	46	CUT	54	T12	46	2	9	640	T12	11
(United States)	Brendan Steele	895	47	CUT	55	T44	60	T13	50	–	–	50
(Zimbabwe)	Brendon de Jonge	892	48	CUT	56	T22	49	T32	47	–	–	47
(Canada)	David Hearn	890	49	T45	50	CUT	59	T28	55	–	–	55
(Australia)	Marc Leishman	854	50	CUT	61	CUT	72	–	–	–	–	72
(United States)	Phil Mickelson	849	51	T50	52	T65	61	T32	61	–	–	61
(United States)	Nick Watney	847	52	CUT	63	T44	64	T19	58	–	–	58
(United States)	Brendon Todd	831	53	T24	47	T44	48	T23	46	–	–	46
(United States)	Pat Perez	825	54	T20	46	T29	43	T45	45	–	–	45
(Australia)	Matt Jones	821	55	T53	57	T4	33	T32	33	–	–	33
(United States)	Ryan Palmer	817	56	T6	33	T65	40	T23	38	–	–	38
(United States)	Cameron Tringale	816	57	T30	51	T44	55	T7	36	–	–	36
(Argentina)	Fabián Gómez*	797	58	71	67	T33	62	T39	64	–	–	64
(England)	Ian Poulter	777	59	CUT	69	T33	66	T53	67	–	–	67
(United States)	Boo Weekley	776	60	CUT	70	T56	76	–	–	–	–	76
(United States)	Kevin Streelman	771	61	T53	65	T69	75	–	–	–	–	75
(United States)	Keegan Bradley	759	62	CUT	71	T25	63	T28	60	–	–	60
(Germany)	Alex Čejka	739	63	CUT	73	T39	71	–	–	–	–	71
(United States)	Matt Every	727	64	CUT	75	CUT	89	–	–	–	–	89
(Sweden)	Carl Pettersson	723	65	CUT	77	T44	77	–	–	–	–	77
(United States)	Daniel Summerhays	720	66	T6	40	T9	26	T41	31	–	–	31
(United States)	Sean O'Hair	719	67	T45	66	T4	38	T53	42	–	–	42
(United States)	George McNeill	715	68	T30	59	CUT	70	T13	62	–	–	62
(United States)	Brian Harman	704	69	T30	62	T12	50	T53	57	–	–	57
(United States)	Charles Howell III	692	70	T58	74	T56	79	–	–	–	–	79
(United States)	Scott Brown	690	71	CUT	84	T69	94	–	–	–	–	94
(South Africa)	Rory Sabbatini	678	72	T24	60	T22	56	67	65	–	–	65
(United States)	Chad Campbell	670	73	CUT	86	CUT	96	–	–	–	–	96
(United States)	William McGirt	652	74	CUT	88	T12	68	T49	69	–	–	69
(United States)	Will Wilcox*	649	75	CUT	89	DNP	97	–	–	–	–	97
(United States)	Davis Love III	649	76	CUT	90	T44	86	–	–	–	–	86
(United States)	Hunter Mahan	648	77	CUT	91	T4	52	T32	49	–	–	49
(United States)	Scott Pinckney*	645	78	T50	76	T60	83	–	–	–	–	83
(United States)	Jerry Kelly	632	79	CUT	94	T9	65	T62	68	–	–	68
(United States)	Colt Knost	628	80	CUT	95	T44	91	–	–	–	–	91
(Scotland)	Martin Laird	628	81	CUT	96	CUT	99	–	–	–	–	99
(United States)	Morgan Hoffmann	627	82	T39	72	73	85	–	–	–	–	85
(United States)	Chesson Hadley	626	83	CUT	97	74	98	–	–	–	–	98
(United States)	Kyle Reifers*	626	84	CUT	98	T25	78	–	–	–	–	78
(United States)	J. J. Henry	620	85	T45	78	CUT	90	–	–	–	–	90
(United States)	Jason Kokrak	614	86	CUT	100	CUT	100	–	–	–	–	100
(Republic of Ireland)	Pádraig Harrington	610	87	CUT	103	–	–	–	–	–	–	103
(Australia)	John Senden	610	88	T45	81	T33	73	–	–	–	–	73
(United States)	Jim Herman*	610	89	T13	64	CUT	74	–	–	–	–	74
(England)	Greg Owen	608	90	CUT	104	–	–	–	–	–	–	104
(United States)	Kevin Chappell	602	91	T24	68	T12	57	T23	52	–	–	52
(United States)	Bryce Molder	595	92	T11	58	CUT	69	T68	70	–	–	70
(United States)	John Peterson*	588	93	CUT	105	–	–	–	–	–	–	105
(Australia)	Adam Scott	585	94	CUT	106	–	–	–	–	–	–	106
(Canada)	Adam Hadwin*	584	95	CUT	107	–	–	–	–	–	–	107
(South Africa)	Charl Schwartzel	584	96	CUT	108	–	–	–	–	–	–	108
(United States)	John Huh	565	97	CUT	110	–	–	–	–	–	–	110
(United States)	Jason Gore	564	98	T30	79	CUT	92	–	–	–	–	92
(Italy)	Francesco Molinari*	558	99	DNP	111	–	–	–	–	–	–	111
(United States)	Hudson Swafford*	554	100	T50	93	T33	81	–	–	–	–	81
(United States)	Johnson Wagner	551	101	T45	92	T44	87	–	–	–	–	87
(Canada)	Nick Taylor*	549	102	T53	101	–	–	–	–	–	–	101
(United States)	Jason Dufner	546	103	T30	82	T60	88	–	–	–	–	88
(Canada)	Graham DeLaet	545	104	CUT	112	–	–	–	–	–	–	112
(United States)	Jon Curran*	540	105	CUT	113	–	–	–	–	–	–	113
(United States)	Zac Blair*	538	106	T4	45	T60	51	T53	59	–	–	59
(United States)	Steve Wheatcroft*	536	107	CUT	114	–	–	–	–	–	–	114
(United States)	Andres Gonzales*	531	108	CUT	115	–	–	–	–	–	–	115
(United States)	Chris Stroud	531	109	CUT	116	–	–	–	–	–	–	116
(England)	Lee Westwood	530	110	T58	109	–	–	–	–	–	–	109
(South Africa)	Retief Goosen	519	111	DNP	118	–	–	–	–	–	–	118
(Mexico)	Carlos Ortiz*	515	112	T24	83	T65	93	–	–	–	–	93
(United States)	Chad Collins	504	113	CUT	120	–	–	–	–	–	–	120
(United States)	Mark Wilson	497	114	T24	85	T69	95	–	–	–	–	95
(United States)	Spencer Levin	496	115	T16	80	T56	82	–	–	–	–	82
(United States)	Stewart Cink	494	116	T39	102	–	–	–	–	–	–	102
(United States)	Ken Duke	493	117	T62	117	–	–	–	–	–	–	117
(Fiji)	Vijay Singh	490	118	T66	119	–	–	–	–	–	–	119
(England)	Luke Donald	484	119	T24	87	T39	80	–	–	–	–	80
(South Africa)	Tim Clark	481	120	CUT	121	–	–	–	–	–	–	121
(Sweden)	Jonas Blixt	471	121	CUT	123	–	–	–	–	–	–	123
(United States)	Erik Compton	471	122	WD	124	–	–	–	–	–	–	124
(Colombia)	Camilo Villegas	467	123	T30	99	T33	84	–	–	–	–	84
(Japan)	Ryo Ishikawa	458	124	T66	122	–	–	–	–	–	–	122
(United States)	Jeff Overton	458	125	T69	125	–	–	–	–	–	–	125

* First-time Playoffs participant

22 players extended their streak of reaching the FedExCup Playoffs every year: Bill Haas, Jeff Overton, Matt Kuchar, Ian Poulter, John Senden, Ryan Moore, Charley Hoffman, Pat Perez, Nick Watney, Bubba Watson, Jerry Kelly, Luke Donald, Brandt Snedeker, Charles Howell III, Justin Rose, Hunter Mahan, Adam Scott, Jim Furyk, Sergio Garcia, Zach Johnson, Rory Sabbatini and Phil Mickelson.

Eight players failed to advance to the FedExCup Playoffs for the first time: Freddie Jacobson, Brian Davis, Bo Van Pelt, Ernie Els, Geoff Ogilvy, Aaron Baddeley, K. J. Choi, and Steve Stricker.

Nine rookies finished inside the top 125: Justin Thomas (36), Tony Finau (39), Daniel Berger (46), Scott Pinckney (78), Adam Hadwin (95), Nick Taylor (102), Jon Curran (105), Zac Blair (106) and Carlos Ortiz (112).
