= Daniel Berger (golfer) =

American professional golfer (born 1993)

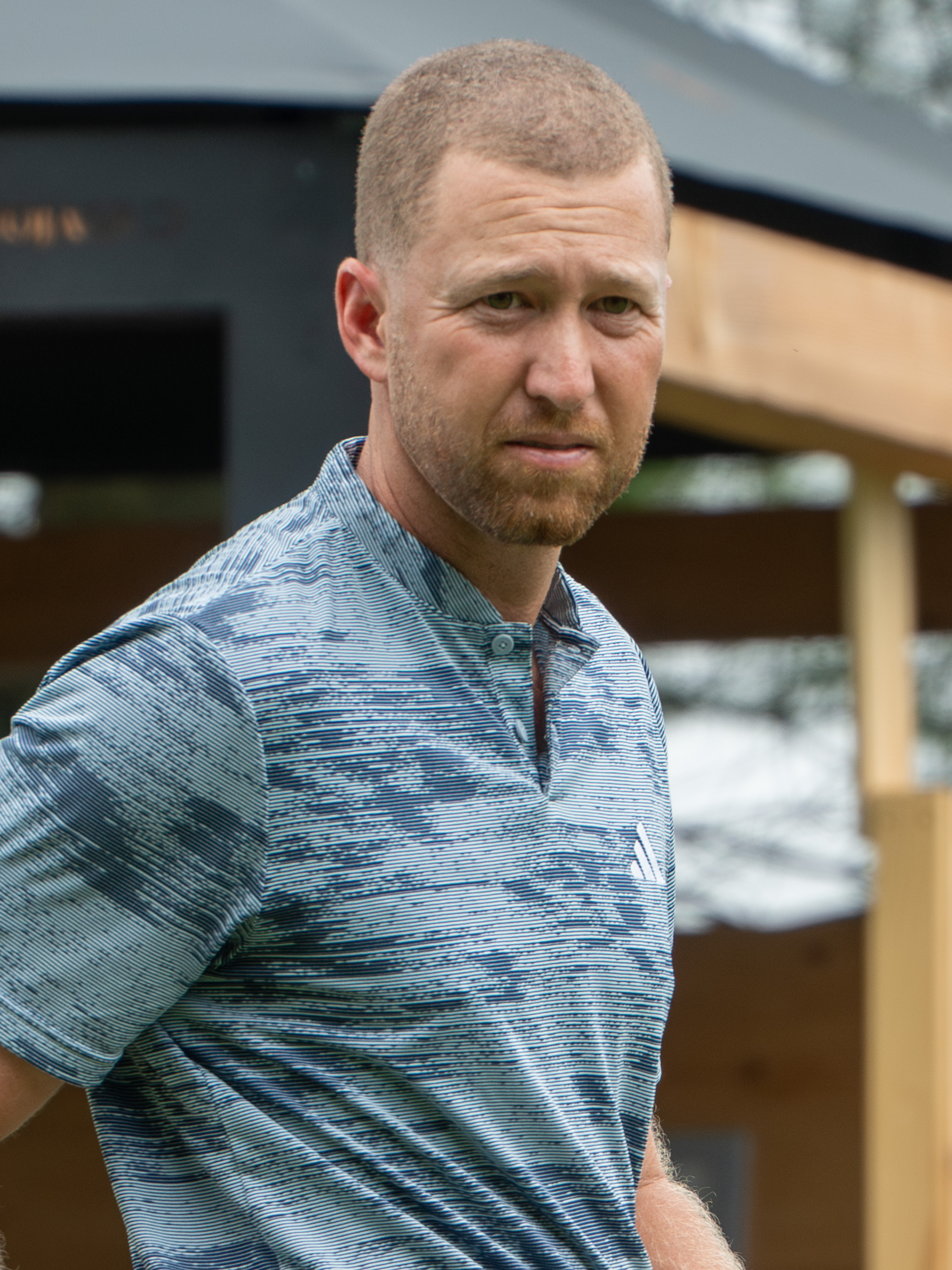
- Berger at the 2025 Travelers Championship

Personal information
- Full name: Daniel F. Berger
- Nationality: United States
- Born: April 7, 1993 (age 33) Plantation, Florida, U.S.
- Height: 6 ft 1 in (1.85 m)
- Weight: 175 lb (79 kg; 12.5 st)
- Life partner: Victoria Slater

Career
- Sport: Golf
- College: Florida State University
- Turned professional: 2013
- Current tour: PGA Tour
- Former tour: Web.com Tour
- Professional wins: 4
- Highest ranking: 12 (October 4, 2020) (as of October 25, 2026)

Number of wins by tour
- PGA Tour: 4

Best results in major championships
- Masters Tournament: T10: 2016
- PGA Championship: T12: 2018
- U.S. Open: T6: 2018
- The Open Championship: T8: 2021

Achievements and awards
- PGA Tour Rookie of the Year: 2014–15

Daniel F. Berger (born April 7, 1993) is an American professional golfer who plays on the PGA Tour. After turning pro at age 20 in 2013, he won the FedEx St. Jude Classic in both 2016 and 2017 and the Charles Schwab Challenge in 2020, the first PGA Tour tournament played after a three-month hiatus due to the COVID-19 pandemic. In February 2021, he won the AT&T Pebble Beach Pro-Am; clinching victory with an eagle on the 18th hole.

== Early life ==
Berger was born in Plantation, Florida, to Jewish parents, Nadia and Jay Berger, a former tennis pro (ranked seventh in the world in 1990), coach, and head of men's tennis for the United States Tennis Association. His grandmother, Roslyn Swift Berger, was an accomplished amateur golfer who was inducted into the Greater Buffalo, New York Sports Hall of Fame in 2000. He has two brothers and a sister.

Berger grew up and lived in Key Biscayne, Florida for about thirteen years and began playing golf at age 10. He began taking lessons from PGA Master Professional, Kevin Perkins on a weekly basis and also attended Perkins' golf camp that summer and fell in love with the game. At that early age, Berger indicated to his father that he would like to become a professional golfer. Berger went on to have good success early, by finishing tie for 22nd in the US Kids International Championship, Boys, age 12, shooting rounds of 75, 79 and 75. Berger later moved with his family to Jupiter, Florida, where he also had his first hole-in-one at age 13. He graduated from William T. Dwyer High School in 2011, though he did not play high school golf.

== Amateur career ==
Berger played college golf at Florida State University in Tallahassee. There, in the spring of 2013 he won both the SunTrust Gator Invitational and the Seminole Intercollegiate, and that season he led the Atlantic Coast Conference (ACC) with a 69.36 stroke average. He tied for second at the 2013 NCAA Golf Championships as a sophomore, and was named a two-time first-team All-American by the Golf Coaches Association of America and Golfweek, and named to the All-Nicklaus team, All-ACC team, and PING All-Region team. He turned pro after his sophomore year, at age 20.

== Professional career ==
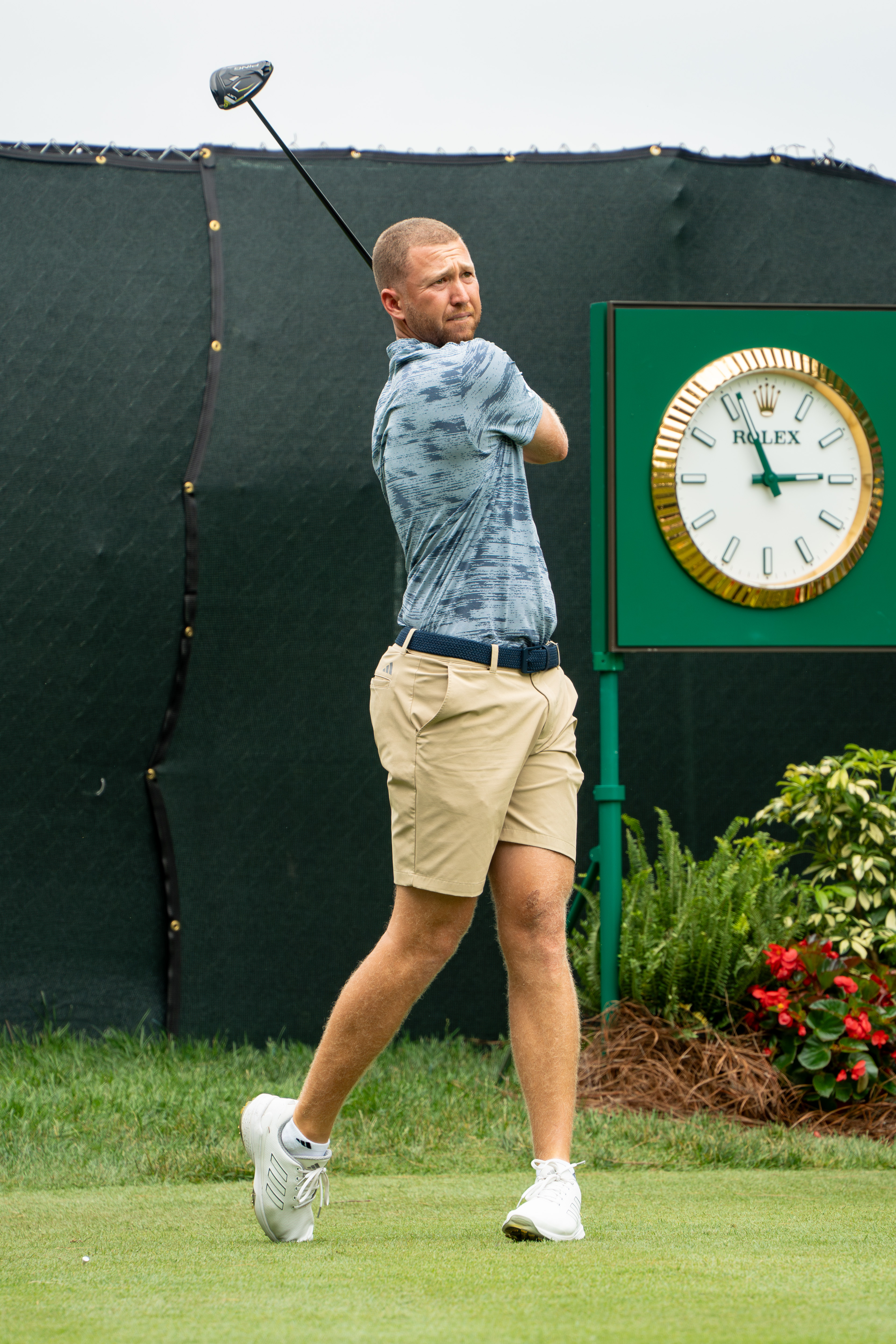
Daniel Berger at the 2025 Travelers Championship

In late 2013, Berger qualified for the Web.com Tour and played four events. The following year, he finished T2 at the TPC Stonebrae Championship and ranked 15th in the season-long Web.com Tour standings, which earned him a promotion to the PGA Tour for the 2014–15 season.

In March 2015, Berger shot a 6-under-par 64 in the final round of the Honda Classic to get into a sudden-death playoff, which he lost to Pádraig Harrington. Had Berger won, it would have been the second-largest final round comeback in PGA Tour history; he began the final round nine strokes behind 54-hole leader Ian Poulter. Three weeks later at the Arnold Palmer Invitational, Berger made a double eagle at the par-5 sixth hole during the third round.

During the 2015 season, Berger made the cut in 17 of 31 events, had six top-10 finishes, including two seconds, and was the only rookie to make the Tour Championship field in late September. He finished 11th in the FedEx Cup rankings, 25th on the money list (earning over $3 million), and was the PGA Tour Rookie of the Year.

Berger gained his first PGA Tour win in June 2016 at the FedEx St. Jude Classic near Memphis, which moved him to 29th in the Official World Golf Ranking. He earned $1.1 million.

At the beginning of the 2017 PGA Tour Season, Berger began using Callaway clubs and balls after switching over from TaylorMade, which he used in his first two seasons on tour. Later that season, Berger successfully defended his FedEx St. Jude Classic title, and moved to 24th in the world. By July, he was ranked 20th in the world. He made the 2017 US Presidents Cup Team.

At the 2018 U.S. Open at Shinnecock Hills Golf Club, Berger shot a third-round 66, putting him in a 4-way tie for the lead with Dustin Johnson, defending champion Brooks Koepka, and Tony Finau. However, a final round 73 left Berger in a tie for 6th place, 5 shots behind eventual winner Koepka.

On June 14, 2020, Berger won the 2020 Charles Schwab Challenge, and received a winner's check of $1.375 million. This was the first PGA Tour tournament back after a three-month hiatus due to the COVID-19 pandemic. Berger won the tournament when Collin Morikawa missed a very short putt for par on the first playoff hole. With the victory he was ranked No. 31 in the world. He had a streak of 32 consecutive rounds at par or better in 2019–20, the eighth-longest streak since 1983, one round fewer than the streaks of Kenny Perry and Harris English.

Berger won the 2021 AT&T Pebble Beach Pro-Am shooting a 65 in the final round. He eagled the final hole to win by two strokes ahead of Maverick McNealy.

In September 2021, Berger played on the U.S. team in the 2021 Ryder Cup at Whistling Straits in Kohler, Wisconsin. The U.S. team won 19–9 and Berger went 2–1–0 including a win in his Sunday singles match against Matt Fitzpatrick.

Berger qualified for the 2026 FedEx Cup Playoffs, finishing 60th of the 70 qualifiers, but did not enter the first event, the FedEx St. Jude Championship.

== Personal life ==
Berger currently resides in Jupiter, Florida.

== Amateur wins ==
- 2009 FCWT National Championship
- 2010 Florida State Match Play Championship
- 2013 Gator Invitational, Seminole Intercollegiate

== Professional wins (4) ==
=== PGA Tour wins (4) ===
No.	Date	Tournament	Winning score	To par	Margin of victory	Runner(s)-up
1	Jun 12, 2016	FedEx St. Jude Classic	67-64-69-67=267	−13	3 strokes	(United States) Brooks Koepka, (United States) Phil Mickelson, (United States) Steve Stricker
2	Jun 11, 2017	FedEx St. Jude Classic (2)	70-68-66-66=270	−10	1 stroke	(South Korea) Kim Meen-whee, (South Africa) Charl Schwartzel
3	Jun 14, 2020	Charles Schwab Challenge	65-67-67-66=265	−15	Playoff	(United States) Collin Morikawa
4	Feb 14, 2021	AT&T Pebble Beach Pro-Am	67-66-72-65=270	−18	2 strokes	(United States) Maverick McNealy

PGA Tour playoff record (1–3)

No.	Year	Tournament	Opponent	Result
1	2015	The Honda Classic	(Republic of Ireland) Pádraig Harrington	Lost to par on second extra hole
2	2017	Travelers Championship	(United States) Jordan Spieth	Lost to birdie on first extra hole
3	2020	Charles Schwab Challenge	(United States) Collin Morikawa	Won with par on first extra hole
4	2026	Arnold Palmer Invitational	(United States) Akshay Bhatia	Lost to par on first extra hole

== Results in major championships ==
Results not in chronological order in 2020.

Tournament	2014	2015	2016	2017	2018
Masters Tournament			T10	T27	T32
U.S. Open	T28		T37	CUT	T6
The Open Championship		CUT		T27	CUT
PGA Championship		CUT	T73	CUT	T12

Tournament	2019	2020	2021	2022	2023	2024	2025	2026
Masters Tournament			CUT	T50			T21	CUT
PGA Championship	T71	T13	T75	CUT			T33	T35
U.S. Open	T49	T34	T7	CUT		T21	T46	CUT
The Open Championship		NT	T8				T30	CUT

Top 10
Did not play

CUT = missed the half-way cut
"T" = tied
NT = no tournament due to COVID-19 pandemic

=== Summary ===
Tournament	Wins	2nd	3rd	Top-5	Top-10	Top-25	Events	Cuts made
Masters Tournament	0	0	0	0	1	2	7	5
PGA Championship	0	0	0	0	0	2	10	7
U.S. Open	0	0	0	0	2	3	11	8
The Open Championship	0	0	0	0	1	1	6	3
Totals	0	0	0	0	4	8	34	23

- Most consecutive cuts made – 5 (2024 U.S. Open – 2025 Open Championship)
- Longest streak of top-10s – 2 (2021 U.S. Open – 2021 Open Championship)

== Results in The Players Championship ==
Tournament	2015	2016	2017	2018	2019	2020	2021	2022	2023	2024	2025	2026
The Players Championship	CUT	T9	T65	T57	T67	C	T9	T13			T20	T66

Top 10
Did not play

CUT = missed the halfway cut
"T" indicates a tie for a place
C = canceled after the first round due to the COVID-19 pandemic

== Results in World Golf Championships ==
Tournament	2015	2016	2017	2018	2019	2020	2021	2022
Championship		T28	T16	T14			T35	
Match Play		T61	T39	T59		NT^{1}	T18	T35
Invitational		WD	T17	T48		T2	T5	
Champions	T11	T2	T24			NT^{1}	NT^{1}	NT^{1}

^{1}Cancelled due to COVID-19 pandemic

Top 10
Did not play

QF, R16, R32, R64 = Round in which player lost in match play
WD = Withdrew
NT = No tournament
"T" = Tied
Note that the Championship and Invitational were discontinued from 2022.

== U.S. national team appearances ==
Amateur

- Palmer Cup: 2013 (winners)

Professional

- Presidents Cup: 2017 (winners)
- Ryder Cup: 2021 (winners)

== See also ==
- 2014 Web.com Tour Finals graduates
- List of Florida State Seminoles men's golfers
- List of Jewish golfers
