= TPC Boston =

Private golf club in Norton, Massachusetts, USA

- Location within the United States Location within Massachusetts
- 41.982°N 71.224°W

Club information
- Location: Norton, Massachusetts, U.S.
- Elevation: 150 feet (45 m)
- Established: 2002; 24 years ago
- Type: Private
- Operator: PGA Tour TPC Network
- Total holes: 18
- Tournaments: FM Championship (2024, 2025) The Northern Trust (2020) Dell Technologies Championship (2003–2018)
- Greens: Penn A-4 Bentgrass
- Fairways: Princeville Bentgrass
- Website: tpc.com/boston
- Designed by: Arnold Palmer (2003); Gil Hanse (2007 redesign) with Brad Faxon
- Par: 73
- Length: 7,216 yards (6,598 m)
- Course rating: 77.2
- Slope rating: 154
- Course record: 59 - Scottie Scheffler (2020)

TPC Boston is a private golf club in the Greater Boston area, located in Norton, Massachusetts, approximately 25 miles (40 km) southwest of Boston.

== History ==
Originally designed by Arnold Palmer and built in 2002, the course was re-designed in 2007 by Gil Hanse and PGA Tour player Brad Faxon. The course is a member of the Tournament Players Club network operated by the PGA Tour. Prior to 2019, the course was the venue for the Dell Technologies Championship, which was previously known as the Deutsche Bank Championship (2003–2016). In 2019, with significant changes to the PGA Tour's schedule change and playoff format, the Dell Technologies Championship was eliminated from the PGA Tour schedule in an effort to end the FedEx Cup playoffs prior to the start of football season. As part of the new schedule, TPC Boston became part of a rotating venue for The Northern Trust, alternating years with a venue in the New York City area. The tournament was held at TPC Boston in 2020.

== Scorecard ==
TPC Boston
Tee	Rating/Slope	1	2	3	4	5	6	7	8	9	Out	10	11	12	13	14	15	16	17	18	In	Total
Championship	77.2/154	365	542	208	298	466	465	600	213	472	3629	425	231	510	447	495	421	161	412	530	3632	7261
Gold	74.7/145	365	542	184	298	410	456	579	192	396	3422	425	211	486	427	516	421	161	412	530	3589	7011
Black	72.4/139	339	493	166	254	375	429	505	184	373	3118	402	185	465	394	495	388	144	389	504	3366	6484
White	70.6/133	318	466	155	237	350	419	498	167	346	2956	377	175	419	356	473	372	130	370	489	3161	6117
Blue	66.4/123	277	437	130	160	263	372	445	107	293	2484	342	150	350	325	391	321	100	330	408	2717	5201
Par		4	5	3	4	4	4	5	3	4	36	4	3	5	4	5	4	3	4	5	37	73
SI		15	3	13	9	7	5	1	17	11		12	16	8	2	14	10	18	6	4
