= Jordan Spieth =

American professional golfer (born 1993)

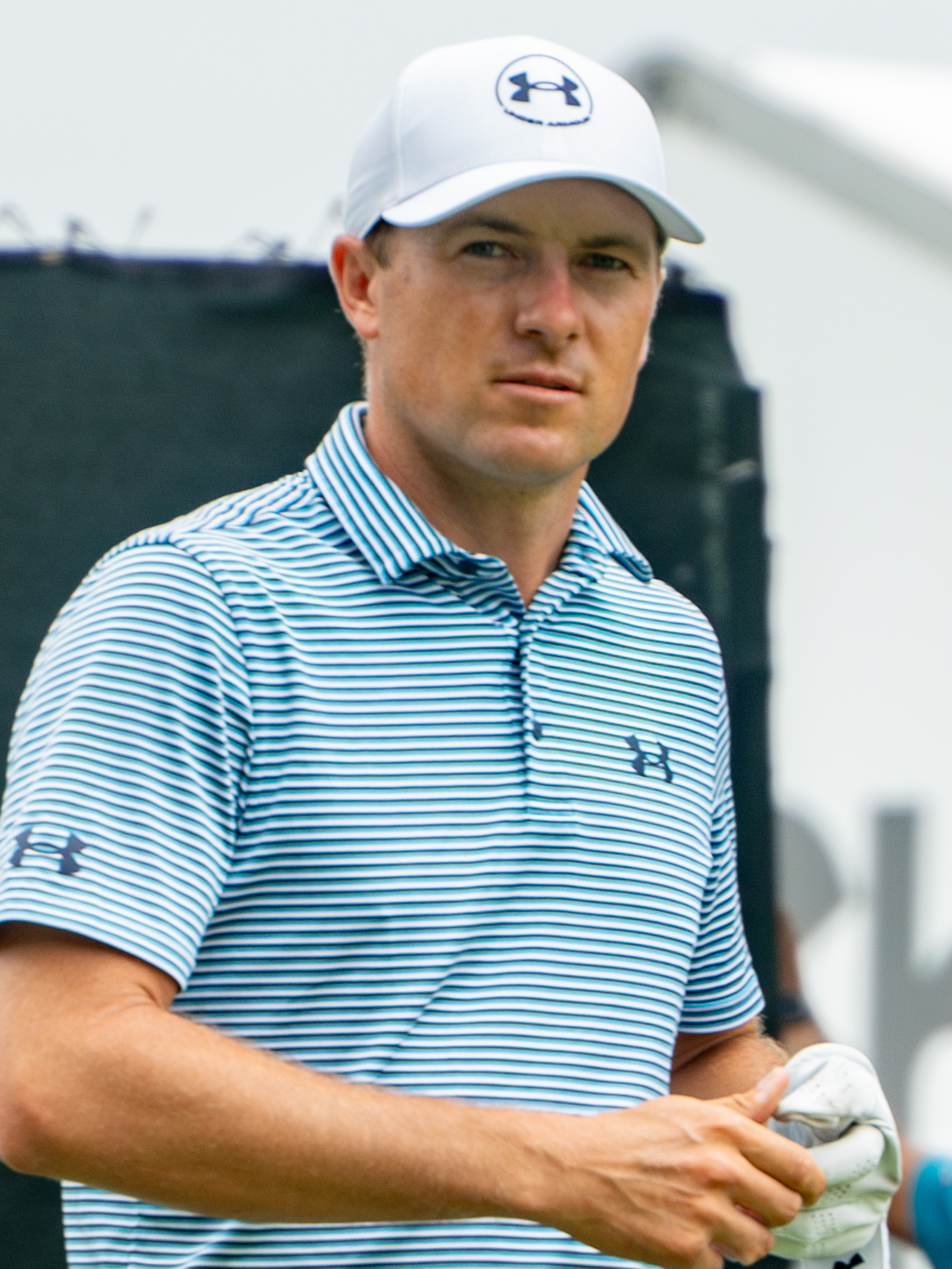
- Spieth at the 2025 Travelers Championship

Personal information
- Full name: Jordan Alexander Spieth
- Nationality: United States
- Born: July 27, 1993 (age 33) Dallas, Texas, U.S.
- Height: 6 ft 1 in (1.85 m)
- Weight: 175 lb (79 kg; 12.5 st)
- Spouse: Annie Verret (m. 2018)
- Children: 3

Career
- Sport: Golf
- College: University of Texas
- Turned professional: 2012
- Current tour: PGA Tour
- Professional wins: 16
- Highest ranking: 1 (August 16, 2015) (26 weeks)

Number of wins by tour
- PGA Tour: 13
- European Tour: 3
- PGA Tour of Australasia: 2
- Other: 1

Best results in major championships (wins: 3)
- Masters Tournament: Won: 2015
- PGA Championship: 2nd: 2015
- U.S. Open: Won: 2015
- The Open Championship: Won: 2017

Achievements and awards
- PGA Tour Rookie of the Year: 2013
- PGA Tour FedEx Cup winner: 2015
- PGA Tour money list winner: 2014–15
- PGA Tour Player of the Year: 2014–15
- PGA Player of the Year: 2015
- Byron Nelson Award: 2014–15, 2016–17
- Vardon Trophy: 2015, 2017

Jordan Alexander Spieth (/ˈspiːθ/, SPEETH; born July 27, 1993) is an American professional golfer who plays on the PGA Tour. He is a former world number one in the Official World Golf Ranking. Spieth has won three major championships.

A two-time U.S. Junior Amateur champion, Spieth reached number one in the World Amateur Golf Ranking in 2012 and turned professional later that year. He won his first PGA Tour title in 2013, aged 19. Spieth recorded his first major win at the 2015 Masters Tournament, where he shot 18-under to tie the scoring record set by Tiger Woods in 1997. He then won the 2015 U.S. Open, becoming at age 21 the youngest U.S. Open champion since Bobby Jones in 1923.

After finishing runner-up at the 2015 PGA Championship, Spieth reached number one in the Official World Golf Ranking for the first time. He followed with a win in the 2015 Tour Championship, which clinched the 2015 FedEx Cup. Spieth added his third major at the 2017 Open Championship. He endured a loss of form in the following years and did not win another professional tournament until 2021. As of 2026, Spieth has a total of 13 PGA Tour victories.

== Early life ==
Spieth was born in 1993 in Dallas, Texas, to Mary Christine (née Julius) and Shawn Spieth, both natives of Pennsylvania. Spieth's grandfather, Donald Spieth, was a music teacher at Moravian College and Northampton Community College in Bethlehem, Pennsylvania, where he was a long-time conductor of the former Lehigh Valley Chamber Orchestra.

Spieth attended St. Monica Catholic School and graduated from Jesuit College Preparatory School of Dallas in 2011. He learned to play golf at Brookhaven Country Club.

== Amateur career ==
In 2009 at Trump National Bedminster and 2011 at Gold Mountain, Spieth won the U.S. Junior Amateur and joined Tiger Woods as the tournament's only two-time winners. Before turning 18 in July 2011, he was No. 1 in the AJGA Golf Rankings, which promotes the best junior golfers in the world. He finished second in the 2008 and 2009 Junior PGA Championship. The American Junior Golf Association named him the Rolex Junior Player of the Year in 2009.

Spieth accepted an exemption to play in the PGA Tour's HP Byron Nelson Championship in 2010. It was the event's first amateur exemption since 1995. The tournament's previous exemptions had included Trip Kuehne in 1995, Justin Leonard, and Woods in 1993. He made the cut, becoming the sixth-youngest player to make the cut at a PGA Tour event. Spieth was tied for seventh place after the third round, and finished the tournament in a tie for 16th place. He was offered another exemption into the tournament in 2011, when he again made the cut and finished in a tie for 32nd.

Spieth played college golf at the University of Texas during his freshman year and one semester of his sophomore year. Spieth was a member of the 2011 Walker Cup team and played in three of the four rounds; he halved his foursomes match and won both singles matches. In his freshman year at Texas, Spieth won three events and led the team in scoring average. He helped his team win the NCAA championship, was named to the All-Big 12 Team, Big 12 Freshman of the Year and Player of the Year, and was a first-team All-American.

In 2012, Spieth earned a spot as an alternate in the U.S. Open after Brandt Snedeker withdrew from the tournament; he tied for 21st and was the low amateur. He became the number one amateur in the World Amateur Golf Ranking after his performance in the U.S. Open and Patrick Cantlay's decision to turn professional.

Spieth did not graduate from the University of Texas, leaving college after one term of his second year to turn professional in December 2012. Concluding his amateur career, Spieth had played in eight PGA Tour events, making the cut five times.

== Professional career ==
In 2012, after failing to advance to the Final Stage of PGA Tour qualifying school, 19-year-old Spieth turned professional midway through his sophomore year at Texas. He partnered with Under Armour for sponsorship in January 2013 and with BioSteel Sports Supplements in March.

=== 2013: First PGA Tour win ===
In the 2013 season, Spieth played in his first tournament in January, where he missed the cut by two strokes at the Farmers Insurance Open at Torrey Pines. In March, Spieth made three cuts, finishing tied for second at the Puerto Rico Open and tied for seventh at the Tampa Bay Championship. He earned Special Temporary Member status in March, which allowed him unlimited sponsor exemptions; non-members are limited to seven exemptions per season. He notched another top-10 finish in April at the RBC Heritage, a tie for ninth. On July 14 (about two weeks before his 20th birthday) Spieth won the John Deere Classic on the fifth hole of a three-way, sudden-death playoff against defending champion Zach Johnson and David Hearn. He became the fourth youngest PGA Tour winner and the first teenager to do so since Ralph Guldahl won the Santa Monica Open in 1931. Spieth holed out from a greenside bunker on the 72nd hole to make the playoff.

With the victory, Spieth was granted full status as a PGA Tour member and became eligible for the FedEx Cup, entering in 11th place in the standings. It also earned him entry into the next three majors: the 2013 Open Championship, PGA Championship, and 2014 Masters. Five weeks after his first victory, Spieth played the Wyndham Championship, where he lost in a playoff to Patrick Reed.

Spieth shot a final round 62 in the Deutsche Bank Championship, vaulting him into a tie for fourth. Just two days later, captain Fred Couples selected Spieth for the United States squad in the 2013 Presidents Cup. On September 27, 2013, he was named PGA Tour Rookie of the Year. At the end of the 2013 season, he was ranked 10th on the PGA Tour money list and 22nd in the Official World Golf Ranking.

=== 2014: Masters runner-up, Ryder Cup debut ===
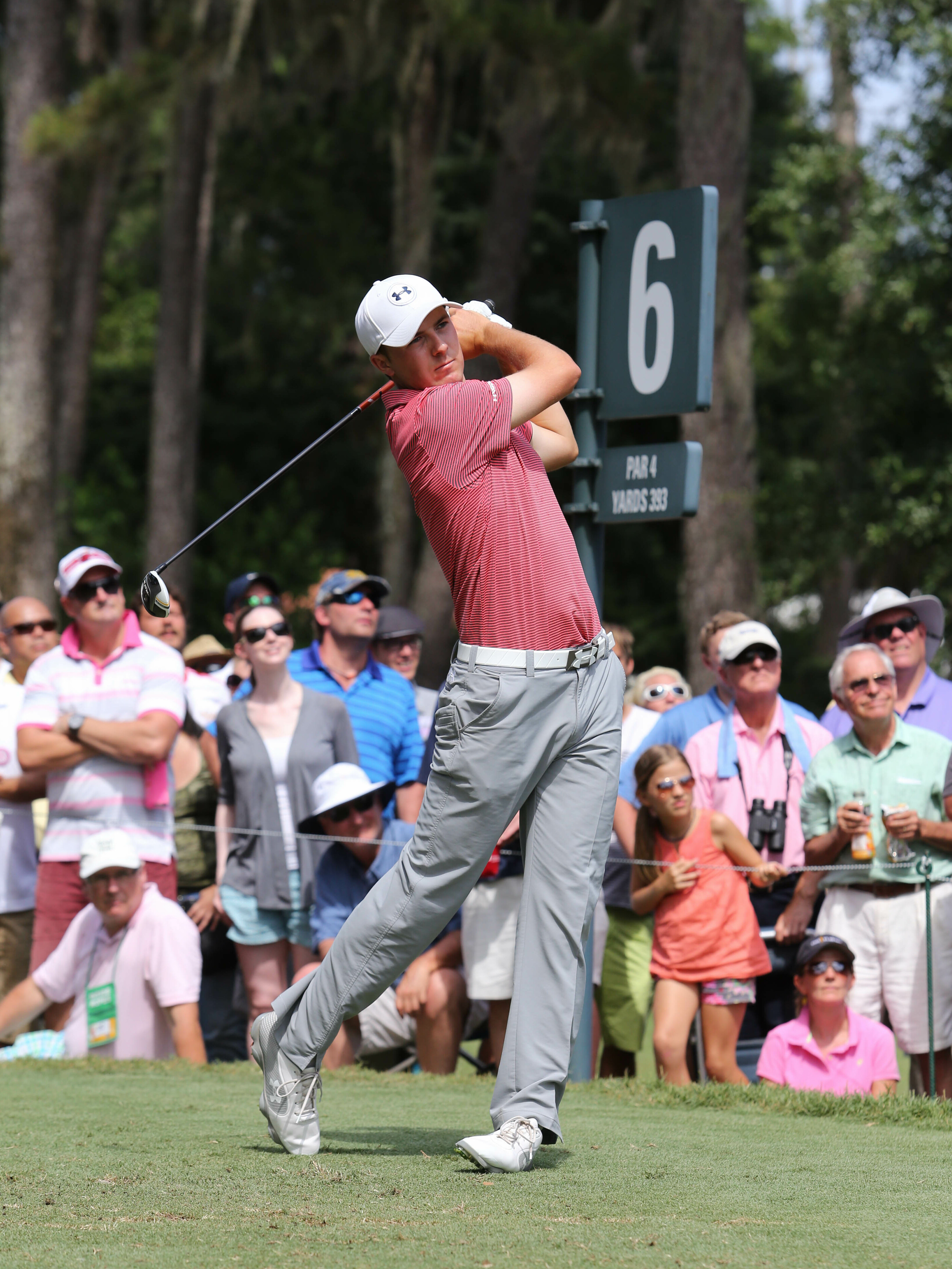
Spieth at the 2014 Players Championship where he finished tied for fourth

Spieth made his Masters debut in April and shared the 54-hole lead with Bubba Watson. During the final round, Spieth at one point was the stand-alone leader by two strokes and in position to become the youngest Masters champion in history; Tiger Woods holds the record at age 21. But Watson retook the lead heading into the second nine and never relinquished it. Spieth finished in a tie for second with Jonas Blixt, becoming the youngest runner-up in Masters history. Spieth ended the tournament with no scores above even-par (72) in any of his rounds. His finish moved him into the top 10 in the world rankings for the first time.

Following the PGA Championship, Spieth earned selection to the 2014 Ryder Cup team, becoming the youngest American to play in the matches for 85 years since Horton Smith in 1929. In November, Spieth won his second tournament as a professional at the Emirates Australian Open on the PGA Tour of Australasia; in the final round he shot a course-record 63 to win the title by six strokes. A week later, he completed consecutive victories, winning the Hero World Challenge in Florida. He won the tournament wire-to-wire and in doing so set a new tournament scoring record of 26-under-par.

=== 2015: Masters, U.S. Open and FedEx Cup champion, World No .1 ===
On March 15, Spieth won the Valspar Championship in a three-way playoff with Patrick Reed and Sean O'Hair. He secured his victory on the third extra hole by sinking a 30-foot birdie putt. The win moved him to 6th in the Official World Golf Ranking.

A runner-up finish at the Valero Texas Open moved him to a career-high ranking of fourth in the world. The following week, Spieth lost in a sudden-death playoff at the Shell Houston Open, having held the 54-hole lead. He shot a final round 70, but had to hole an 8-footer on the last to force the playoff following low rounds by J. B. Holmes and Johnson Wagner that had pushed them to the top of the leaderboard. On the first playoff hole, Spieth put his drive nearly into the water, and then followed up with a poor shot into the green-side bunker, causing his elimination from the playoff, which was won by Holmes.

==== 2015 Masters Tournament ====
On April 9, Spieth shot an opening round 64 to finish the day eight strokes under par with a three-shot lead in the Masters Tournament at Augusta, Georgia; Spieth set a record as the youngest player to lead the Masters after the first round. His score was only one shot behind the course record of 63 shared by Nick Price and Greg Norman, with their rounds coming in 1986 and 1996 respectively. Spieth shot 66 the following day to break the 36-hole Masters scoring record by posting 14-under 130 through two rounds. The previous record, set by Raymond Floyd in 1976, was 13-under 131. He broke the 54-hole record at the Masters shooting a 16-under 200 through three rounds.

During the final round Spieth briefly held a score of −19 but bogeyed the final hole resulting in him tying Tiger Woods' 1997 score record at 18-under. Spieth set the record for the most birdies during the Masters by making 28 and became the second-youngest person to win the Masters. His victory was the first wire-to-wire Masters win since Raymond Floyd's in 1976. The victory moved Spieth to #2 in the Official World Golf Ranking.

==== 2015 U.S. Open ====
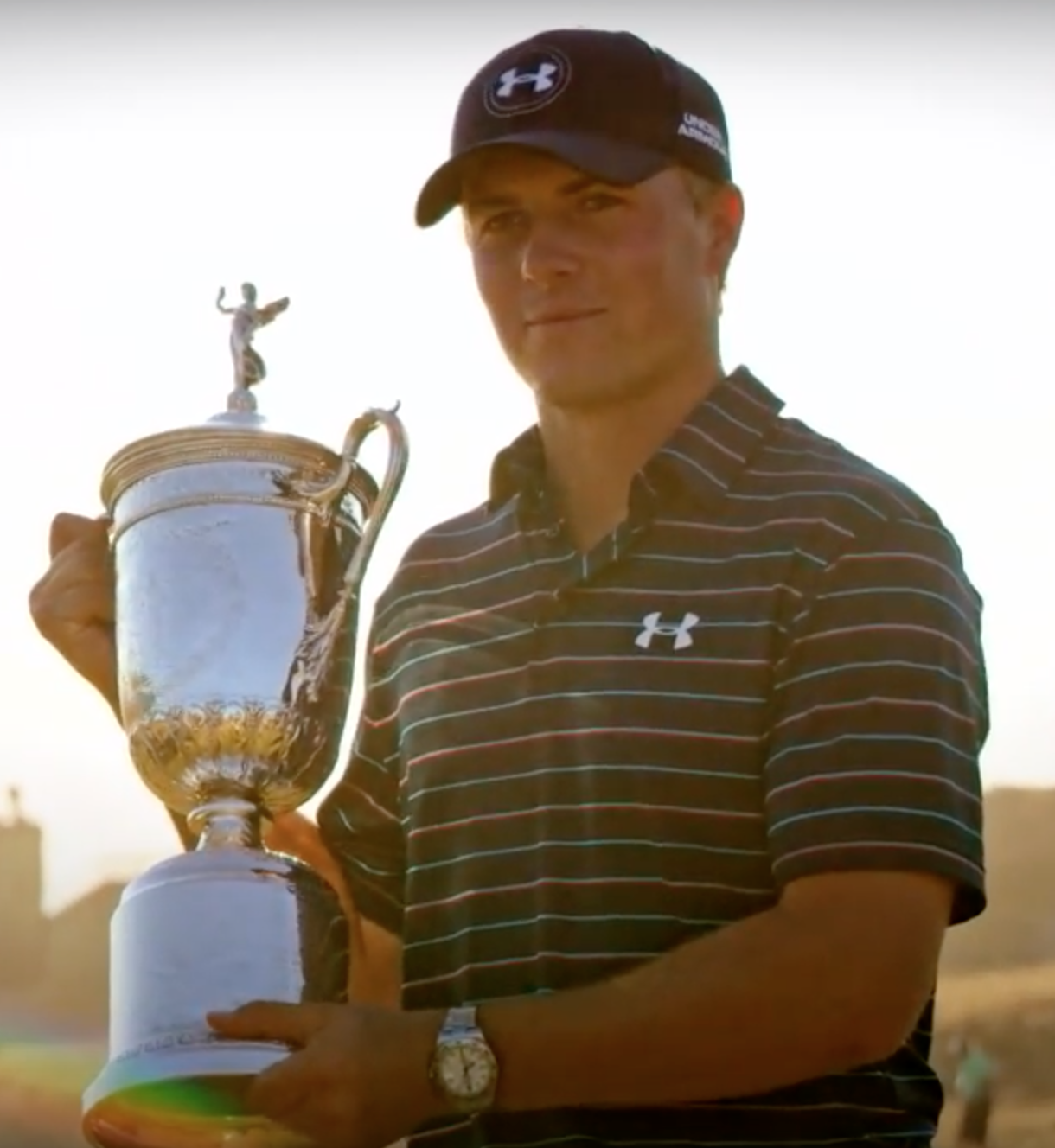
Spieth with the 2015 U.S. Open trophy

On June 21, Spieth won the U.S. Open to claim his second major championship. He carded a one-under 69 in the final round to finish with a total of 275 (-5) and win the tournament by one stroke over Dustin Johnson and Louis Oosthuizen. Spieth had begun the day in a four-way tie for the lead and played in the penultimate group alongside Branden Grace.

He opened his final round with a bogey to fall behind, but then a run of 12 pars and two birdies in his next 14 holes moved him into a tie for the lead with Grace at five under par. On the 16th hole, Grace hit his tee shot out of bounds that led to a double bogey and Spieth capitalized by rolling in a lengthy birdie putt to create a three shot swing, which gave Spieth a three shot lead with two to play. However, on the 17th tee, Spieth pushed his tee shot well right into the thick rough, which led to a double bogey and coupled with Johnson's birdie on the 16th, the two were tied for the lead briefly. Spieth made birdie on the 18th to become the leader in the clubhouse. Johnson then had an eagle putt to win the tournament outright on the 72nd hole, but three-putted from 12 feet to finish one stroke behind.

Spieth became only the sixth player ever to win the Masters and the U.S. Open in the same year, and the first since Tiger Woods in 2002. The other four golfers to accomplish this feat are Hall of Fame members Craig Wood, Ben Hogan, Arnold Palmer, and Jack Nicklaus. He became the fourth-youngest player to win multiple major championships and the youngest winner of the U.S. Open since Bobby Jones in 1923.

==== Rest of 2015 ====
The week before The Open Championship, Spieth chose to play at the John Deere Classic rather than the Aberdeen Asset Management Scottish Open, where many other top-ranked players were competing to prepare for the links style courses.

Spieth shot the lowest round of his professional career to date, with a 61 in the 3rd round. He eventually won the tournament in a playoff with Tom Gillis after Gillis hit the ball in the pond on the 2nd playoff hole. Spieth earned his fourth victory of the year. His quest for the grand slam ended when he finished tied for 4th in The Open Championship with a final score of –14, one stroke out of a playoff. He had been tied for the lead but bogeyed the 17th hole to drop one stroke behind and could not make his birdie on the 18th to join the playoff.

After finishing second behind Jason Day at the 2015 PGA Championship, he became the world number one in the Official World Golf Ranking. He was the 18th different golfer to earn the honor. He was number one for two weeks in August 2015 and one week in September.

Spieth missed the cut in The Barclays and the Deutsche Bank Championship, the first two events of the FedEx Cup playoffs. However, his tied for 13th finish at the BMW Championship kept him second overall in the standings. Only needing a victory to clinch the championship, Spieth won the 2015 Tour Championship at East Lake Golf Club by four strokes. With the win, his fifth of the year, Spieth became the ninth FedEx Cup champion and earned a $10 million bonus for winning the Cup. Spieth won $12,030,485 (not including the $10 million bonus) in 2015, a PGA Tour record for a single year. He regained the world number one ranking.

Spieth swept all the major awards for the season: PGA Player of the Year and PGA Tour Player of the Year (Jack Nicklaus Trophy), Vardon Trophy and Byron Nelson Award for leading the tour in scoring average, and Arnold Palmer Award for leading the tour's money list. In recognition of his 2015 season, Spieth won the Laureus World Sports Award for Breakthrough of the Year in 2016.

=== 2016: Augusta ===
Spieth started the year when he won the Hyundai Tournament of Champions with a dominant display that saw him race to an eight stroke victory over Patrick Reed. His score of −30 was not only a personal best, it was also only the second time a player reached −30 in a 72-hole PGA Tour event, after Ernie Els achieved the feat in 2003 at the same event. Spieth also matched Tiger Woods, by winning his seventh PGA Tour event before the age of 23.

In April 2016, Spieth shot a bogey-free 66 during the first round of the Masters to open up a two shot lead over the field. He carded a two-over-par 74 during the second round, leading by one over Rory McIlroy entering the weekend. He led by one stroke after a third round 73. In the final round, after leading by five strokes heading into the back-nine, Spieth suffered one of the biggest collapses in Masters history, with many comparing it to the meltdown of Greg Norman at the 1996 Masters. (Note: See:) After bogeys at the 10th and 11th holes, Spieth hit two balls into the water at the par-3 12th hole, carding a quadruple-bogey and dropping him to a tie for fourth, three shots back. He finished second in the tournament, losing to Danny Willett by three strokes. Three-time Masters winner Nick Faldo, who won the 1996 tournament, said that Spieth's collapse "made Norman's feel like a joyful stroll down Magnolia Lane".

On May 29, 2016, Spieth returned to the winner's circle for the first time since his Masters collapse when he won the Dean & DeLuca Invitational. He birdied six holes on the back nine on Sunday to see off the challenge of Harris English by three strokes.

Spieth declined to be a member of the U.S. golf team at the 2016 Summer Olympics in Rio de Janeiro.

Following a strong showing in the 2016 FedEx Cup Playoffs, Spieth played a prominent role on a victorious U.S. Ryder Cup Team. He was the world's #3 ranked player at the time, behind Jason Day and Rory McIlroy.

In November, Spieth won the Emirates Australian Open on the PGA Tour of Australasia for the second time in three years, shooting a final round 69 to finish at −12, level with Australians Cameron Smith and Ashley Hall. Spieth claimed the title on the first playoff hole with a birdie, while Hall missed his birdie opportunity. The win was Spieth's 11th of his professional career and his third of 2016.

=== 2017: Open champion ===
Spieth began the year as defending champion at the SBS Tournament of Champions, but had to settle for a tie for third, six shots behind eventual winner Justin Thomas. The following week, at the Sony Open in Hawaii, Spieth again finished in third. Another top ten finish followed at the Waste Management Phoenix Open, to maintain Spieth's solid start to the year.

On February 12, in his 100th PGA Tour tournament as a professional, Spieth picked up his first victory of the year at the AT&T Pebble Beach Pro-Am, finishing at −19. With this win, Spieth became just the second man, along with Tiger Woods, to win nine times on the PGA Tour before the age of 24, post-World War II.

His next start saw him tied for 22nd at the Genesis Open, before finishing tied for 12th at the WGC-Mexico Championship. His next event was also a World Golf Championship event; the WGC-Dell Technologies Match Play. Spieth was seeded 5th, but failed to progress out of the pool stage; a surprise loss to Japan's 54th seed Hideto Tanihara (who would go on to reach the semi-finals) in his opening match, ultimately costing him. Spieth's first missed cut of the year came a week later at the Shell Houston Open.

In his fourth appearance at the Masters, Spieth finished tied for 11th. This was the first time that he had failed to finish either first or second in the opening major of the year. Spieth entered the final round just two shots off the lead, but a 3-over-par 75 on Sunday dashed his hopes of a second Green Jacket.

After finishing 4th alongside Ryan Palmer at the Zurich Classic, Spieth missed consecutive cuts at the Players Championship and the AT&T Byron Nelson. A return to form came at the Dean & DeLuca Invitational, where Spieth narrowly missed out on successfully defending his title, finishing a shot behind eventual winner Kevin Kisner. A tie for 13th followed at the Memorial Tournament, his final start before the U.S. Open.

Spieth arrived at Erin Hills for the U.S. Open looking for a second victory at golf's second major in three years and a third major title overall. However, he finished at one-over-par for the tournament and in a tie for 35th.

The following week, Spieth made his debut at the Travelers Championship and began with a 7-under-par 63 to lead after the first round and kept his advantage heading into the final round. He ended the tournament at −12, along with Daniel Berger, who was seeking his second victory in three weeks. Spieth holed out from a greenside bunker for birdie on the first playoff hole to take his 10th PGA Tour title, just over a month shy of his 24th birthday.

==== 2017 Open Championship ====
On July 23, Spieth won the Open Championship at Royal Birkdale, giving him his third major title. Spieth tied for the lead after a first-round 65 and held the lead outright after the second and third rounds, leaving him three shots clear of Matt Kuchar heading into the final day. However, that lead was lost after three bogeys in his opening four holes of the final round. Kuchar took the lead with five holes remaining after Spieth drove his ball 100 yards to the right of the fairway on the par-4 13th, leaving him with an unplayable lie and needing to take a drop for a one stroke penalty; Spieth limited the damage by striping a 3-iron from the practice range area and making bogey, leaving him just a shot behind Kuchar. In a show of good sportsmanship, Spieth apologized to Kuchar for the 21-minute delay to sort out his wayward tee shot.

Spieth's response to that wobble saw him nearly holing his tee shot at 14 (where he would make birdie), draining a 35-foot putt for an eagle at 15, and carding birdies at 16 and 17. Spieth finished with a final round 69 — three strokes clear of Kuchar, who also carded a 69 – and became just the second player in history after Jack Nicklaus to win three of the four men's golf majors before his 24th birthday.

Spieth later gave the 3-iron from that shot on the 13th hole to Royal Birkdale.

==== Rest of 2017 ====
After finishing in a tie for 13th at the WGC-Bridgestone Invitational, Spieth headed to the final major of the year, the PGA Championship, with the opportunity to become the sixth man in history to win the career grand slam. However, he finished in a tie for 28th.

Spieth finished second in the first FedEx Cup Playoff event at The Northern Trust, losing to world no. 1 Dustin Johnson in a playoff. Spieth had been leading by three strokes heading into the final round, and was five shots clear after five holes on Sunday. However, his tee shot found the water at the par-3 6th (where he made double bogey) and Johnson pulled level at the 10th. The two men were level heading to the 72nd and final hole of regular play. Johnson needed to make a 20-foot putt for par to force a playoff. Johnson made the putt, and then on the first playoff hole (also at 18), Johnson carried the lake and wedged to within a few feet. Spieth found the fringe on the back of the green, but could not make the birdie he needed, missing out on his fourth win of the year.

Spieth had another runner-up finish the next week at the Dell Technologies Championship, finishing three shots behind Justin Thomas, who took his fifth victory of the season. Spieth then finished in a tie for 7th at the BMW Championship.

Spieth headed into the season-ending Tour Championship at East Lake knowing victory would guarantee him his second FedEx Cup title in three years. He would finish for the second consecutive week in a tie for 7th, which proved not to be enough as Justin Thomas finished second to Xander Schauffele to take the season-long title and the $10m prize, as well as the 2017 PGA Tour Player of the Year. Spieth did take the Vardon Trophy and Byron Nelson Award for the second time in his career for leading the tour in scoring average.

A third Presidents Cup victory would follow, as Spieth was part of the United States team which comfortably defended their title. Following a near two-month break, Spieth headed to Australia looking for a third Australian Open title in four years. He finished in 8th place after a final round of 67.

=== 2018 ===
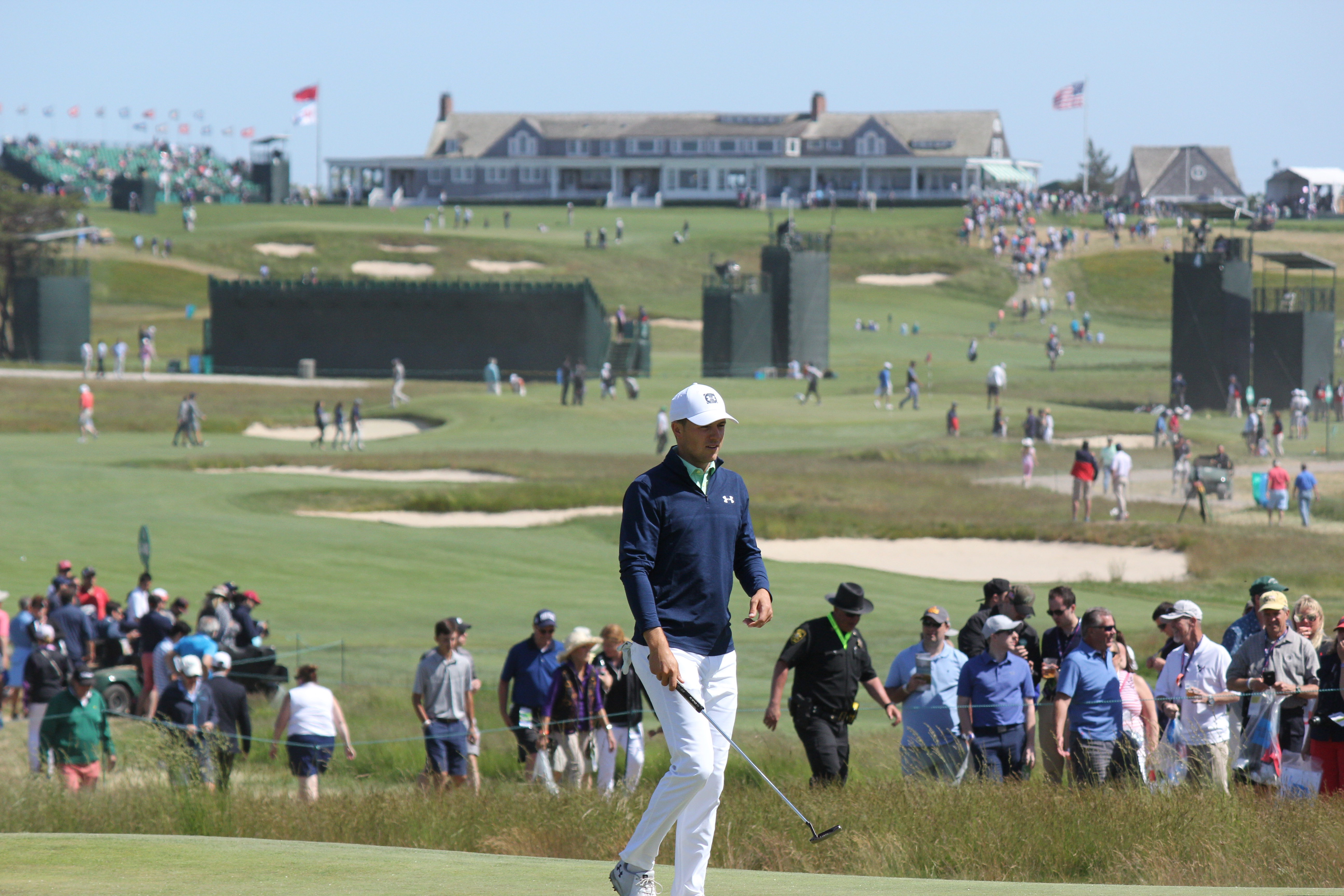
Spieth at Shinnecock Hills Golf Club for the 2018 U.S. Open

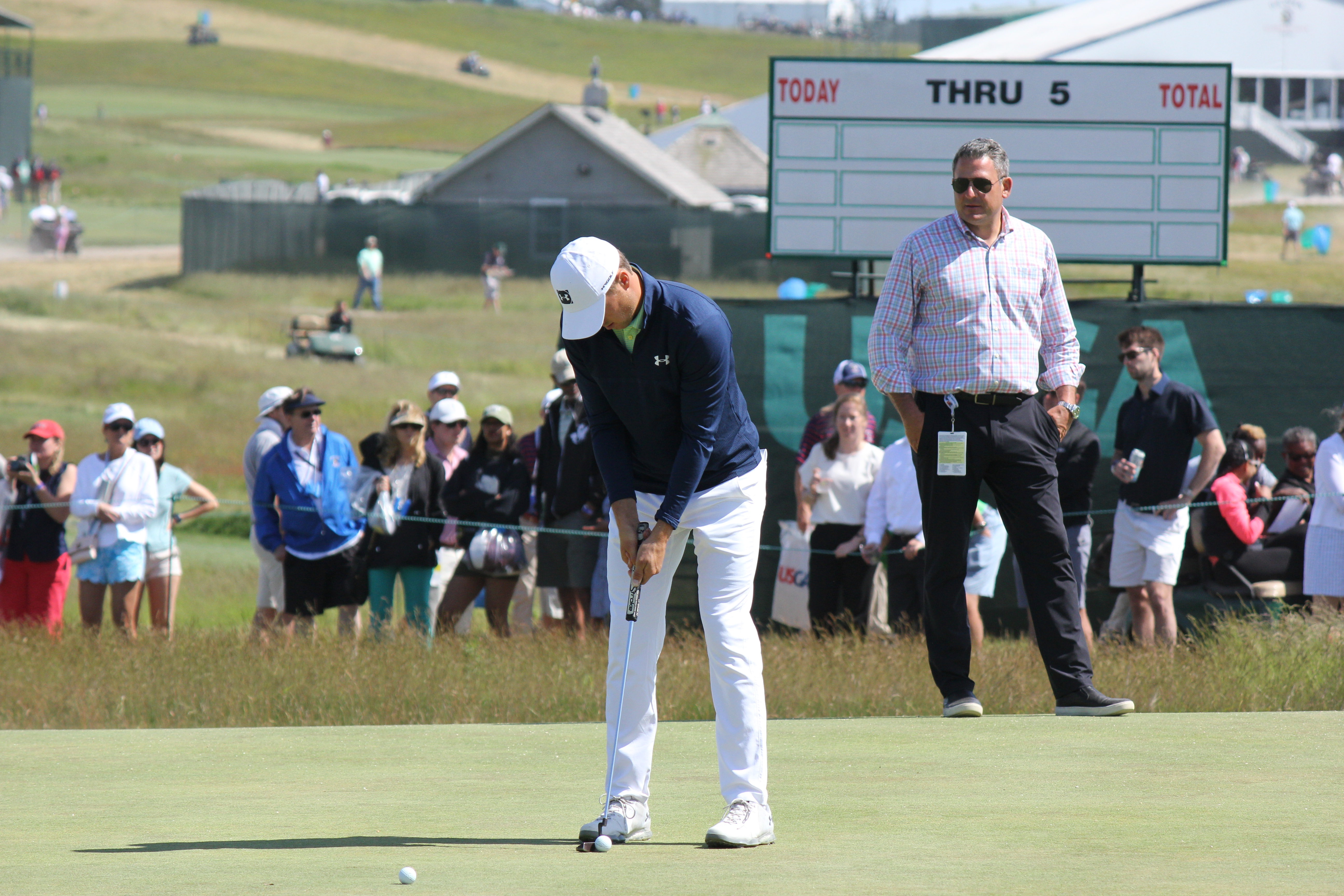
Spieth practicing putting during the practice rounds of the 2018 U.S. Open

For the second consecutive year, Spieth began his season by competing in both tournaments during the Hawaii swing, finishing 9th at the Sentry Tournament of Champions and in a tie for 18th at the Sony Open in Hawaii (he would make the longest putt of his career (90'8") during the second round), before missing the cut at the Phoenix Open and finishing in a tie for 20th as the defending champion at the AT&T Pebble Beach Pro-Am.

In February, Spieth was announced as the PGA Tour's Chairman of the Player Advisory Council, succeeding Davis Love III. The 16-member panel consults with the PGA Tour's Policy Board and commissioner Jay Monahan on issues affecting the tour; Spieth will serve a three-year term (2019–2021). On the course, Spieth had been having struggles with his putting at the beginning of the year, but a tie for 9th at the Genesis Open left him feeling optimistic about his game, stating: "I putted extremely well this week, which is awesome. I feel great about the state of my game going forward." A tie for 14th would follow at the WGC-Mexico Championship.

A month away from the Masters Tournament, Spieth was hoping to kick-start his season at the Valspar Championship, where he was victorious in 2015, which led on to his magnificent year with his win at Augusta, as well as the U.S. Open. However, Spieth's difficult campaign continued, missing the cut at +5. His next start at the WGC Match Play saw him seeded 4th. He was victorious over Charl Schwartzel and Li Haotong, but was defeated by Ryder Cup playing partner Patrick Reed in their winner-takes-all final match, which meant Spieth failed to progress out of the group stage. In his final event before Augusta, Spieth finished in a tie for 3rd at the Houston Open.

Spieth began the Masters with a six-under par round of 66 (including five consecutive birdies on holes 13–17), giving him a two-shot lead, meaning for the third time in four years, he would lead the opening major of the year after the first round. Entering the final round at −5, he was nine strokes behind leader Patrick Reed. He tied the best final round score in Masters history, shooting an 8-under 64. He missed a par putt on the 18th hole to tie the tournament record score (63, −9). He finished at −13, in third place, two strokes behind the champion Reed.

In his first start after Augusta, Spieth, playing alongside Ryan Palmer at the Zurich Classic of New Orleans, missed the cut. For the first time since his debut at the event in 2014, Spieth made the cut at The Players Championship and shot a personal best round of 65 during the third round, leaving him on course for a possible top-10 finish. However, a 2-over-par final round of 74 (including a quadruple bogey on the 72nd hole) left him at −6 for the tournament and in a tie for 41st. A tie for 21st at the AT&T Byron Nelson and a tie for 32nd at the Fort Worth Invitational would follow. In his final start before the U.S. Open, Spieth would miss the cut at the Memorial Tournament.

Spieth missed the cut at the U.S. Open by a shot, the first time he had not made the cut at a major championship since the 2014 PGA Championship. The following week, Spieth began the defense of his Travelers Championship title with a 7−under−par round of 63, which included 6 birdies and an eagle. He couldn't replicate that form for the rest of the tournament, and finished in a tie for 42nd at −4.

After a month off from competition, Spieth's next start came at The Open at Carnoustie, where he was the defending champion and looking for his first win since his third major title a year earlier. He was seeking to join Tiger Woods, Bobby Jones and Young Tom Morris as the only players to have won at least four majors before age 25. His defense began with a 1-over-par round of 72, but he moved into contention over the next couple of days, with a bogey-free Saturday round of 65 moving him into a tie for the lead with fellow Americans Xander Schauffele and Kevin Kisner. However, Spieth shot 76 on Sunday, with no birdies on his card, tumbling into a tie for ninth at −4, finishing four shots behind the champion Francesco Molinari.

Spieth finished in a tie for 60th in his next start at the WGC-Bridgestone Invitational, before a second attempt to complete the career grand slam at the PGA Championship saw him finish in a tie for 12th.

During the FedEx Cup Playoffs, Spieth finished in a tie for 25th at The Northern Trust, before a tied 12th finish at the Dell Technologies Championship. A tie for 55th finish at the BMW Championship left Spieth 31st in the FedEx Cup standings. With only the top-30 qualifying for the Tour Championship, it meant for the first time in his career, Spieth would miss the final event of the season, leaving him without a victory in the 2017–18 season.

Spieth played in all five sessions of the Ryder Cup, collecting three points alongside Justin Thomas, but Europe would regain the trophy in Paris.

In his first start of the 2018–19 PGA Tour season, Spieth finished tied 55th at the Shriners Hospitals for Children Open. He then missed the cut at the Mayakoba Golf Classic, meaning for the first time in his professional career, Spieth had gone an entire calendar year without a victory worldwide.

=== 2019–2020 ===
Spieth began 2019 by missing the cut by a shot at the Sony Open in Hawaii, before finishing in a tie for 35th at the Farmers Insurance Open. A tie for 45th followed at the AT&T Pebble Beach Pro-Am; Spieth had been a shot off the lead at the halfway point, but over-par rounds over the weekend saw him fall down the leaderboard.

In February 2019, Spieth entered the final round of the Genesis Open in a tie for fourth. However, brisk conditions and gusty winds left him with a final round 81. His scorecard featured a double bogey on No. 2, a triple bogey on No. 5 where he three-putted from 4 feet and a quadruple-bogey 8 on the treacherous 10th hole after nearly driving the green. A tie for 54th followed at the WGC-Mexico Championship. For the fourth time in five years, Spieth missed the cut at the Players Championship, before exiting in the round robin stages at the WGC-Dell Technologies Match Play and then finishing in a tie for 30th at the Valero Texas Open.

His sixth appearance at The Masters saw Spieth's worst finish at Augusta, a tie for 21st at five under par. After a tie for 54th finish at the RBC Heritage and a tie for 29th finish at the AT&T Byron Nelson, Spieth headed to Bethpage Black and the PGA Championship for his third attempt at the Career Grand Slam. He would fall short, finishing six shots behind defending champion Brooks Koepka, but his tie for 3rd result saw his first top-10 finish of 2019 (and his first since the 2018 Open Championship) and his best result since finishing 3rd at the previous year's Masters. Another top-10 finish followed a week later at the Charles Schwab Challenge, finishing in a tie for 8th and his upward trend in form continued with a tie for 7th finish at the Memorial Tournament.

Spieth finished tied for 65th at the U.S. Open, before missing the cut at the Travelers Championship. In the final major of the year, The Open, Spieth finished in a tie for 20th. After a tie for 12th at the WGC-FedEx St. Jude Invitational, Spieth missed the secondary cut at the Wyndham Championship. In the FedEx Cup Playoffs, a tie for 37th at the BMW Championship and a tie for 6th at The Northern Trust left Spieth 44th in the rankings, meaning for the second consecutive season, he missed the Tour Championship and had failed to win an event.

The start of Spieth's 2019–20 PGA Tour season came at the CJ Cup in South Korea, where he finished in a tie for 8th. It was not to be the beginning of a return to form as poor results followed and at the end of January, after finishing tied for 55th place in the Farmers Insurance Open, he fell outside the top 50 in the world rankings for the first time since his first season on tour.

In June 2020, Spieth finished tied for 10th at the Charles Schwab Challenge at Colonial Country Club in Fort Worth, Texas, after maintaining a lead for most of the third round. Spieth then finished tied for 68th at RBC Heritage at Harbour Town Golf Links in Hilton Head Island, South Carolina and tied for 54th at the Travelers Championship at TPC River Highlands in Cromwell, Connecticut. Spieth next played in the Workday Charity Open at Muirfield Village in Dublin, Ohio, where he missed his second cut of the season.

=== 2021–2022: Return to winning form, Open runner-up ===
Spieth began the year with a missed cut at the Farmers Insurance Open. The following week, at the Waste Management Phoenix Open at TPC Scottsdale, he opened the tournament with back-to-back 4-under-par 67s, before tying his career low round with a 10-under par 61 on Saturday to tie for the lead with Xander Schauffele heading into the final round. On Sunday, Spieth returned a 1-over par 72 to finish two strokes behind winner Brooks Koepka. Spieth's third appearance of 2021 came at the AT&T Pebble Beach Pro-Am, where he again failed to convert the 54-hole lead, finishing in a tie for third place. In his next three starts, Spieth finished in ties for 15th, 4th, and 48th places at the Genesis Invitational, Arnold Palmer Invitational, and The Players Championship.

In his eighth start of the season, Spieth won the Valero Texas Open with rounds of 67-70-67-66, to end a 1,351-day spell without a victory. He followed this victory with a third-place finish in the Masters. Following the Masters, Spieth took four weeks off, during which he contracted and recovered from COVID-19, and switched to the 2021 model of the Pro V1X golf ball. In July 2021, Spieth was runner-up at The Open Championship, two shots behind winner Collin Morikawa. In September 2021, Spieth played on the U.S. team in the 2021 Ryder Cup; he won one, lost 2 and tied one of his matches.

During the third round of the AT&T Pebble Beach Pro-Am in February 2022, Spieth hit an approach shot on the eighth hole standing inches from the edge of a cliff. The aerial view from the camera above showed that the ball nearly rolled down the cliff. Course management decided to extend the cliff to avoid liability after fans began to attempt the shot.

On April 17, 2022, Spieth won his 13th PGA Tour title, when he achieved victory at the RBC Heritage, defeating Patrick Cantlay in a playoff having overturned a 3 stroke deficit to third round leader, Harold Varner III.

In September 2022, Spieth was selected to play on the U.S. team in the 2022 Presidents Cup; he won all five of his matches, including four partnered with Justin Thomas.

=== 2023 ===
In September 2023, Spieth played on the U.S. team in the 2023 Ryder Cup at Marco Simone Golf and Country Club in Guidonia, Rome, Italy. The European team won 16.5–11.5 and Spieth went 0–2–2 including a tie in his Sunday singles match against Shane Lowry.

=== 2024 ===
Spieth again played well enough to make it into the FedEx Cup playoffs, finishing ranked 67th after the FedEx St. Jude Championship, but failed to win a tournament. He started the season strong, finishing 3rd in The Sentry and then, a few weeks later, tied for 6th in the WM Phoenix Open, but his only other top 10 finish for the rest of the year was a tie for 10th at the Valero Texas Open. He missed 7 cuts, including at the Masters, and was disqualified from the Genesis Invitational for signing an incorrect scorecard.

== 2025 ==
Spieth again made the first round of the FedEx Cup playoffs, despite only two top 5 finishes - at the Phoenix Open and the Byron Nelson. He was helped by only missing two cuts the whole season, and had to withdraw from the Travelers. He just missed the 2nd round of the playoffs, coming in 54th.

== 2026 ==
For the third season in a row, Spieth made it as far as the first round of the FedEx Cup playoffs, this time without finishing in the top 10. His best performance was a tie for 11th at the Arnold Palmer Invitational, but again he only missed three cuts all season. At the FedEx St. Jude invitational he was the leader on Day 1, needing a top 10 finish to advance to the 2nd round, but he finished 52nd in the rankings and was eliminated.

== Personal life ==
In January 2018, Spieth became engaged to his long-time girlfriend Annie Verret. The two married in November 2018 in Dallas. Their first child, a son, was born in 2021. They had a second child in 2023 and a third in 2025.

Spieth has two younger siblings, a brother and a sister. His sister, Ellie, grew up with disabilities, and Jordan has credited her with "keeping him grounded and focused as well as keeping the game of golf in perspective." After earning a spot on the 2013 Presidents Cup team, Spieth started the Spieth Family Foundation for which Ellie was the primary inspiration. It provides awareness and financial assistance to community organizations benefiting special needs children, military families, junior golf and pediatric cancer.

Spieth is a minority shareholder in the Premier League soccer club Leeds United.

Spieth is a Catholic. He attends the PGA Bible Study. Spieth appeared in the Netflix documentary series Full Swing, which premiered in 2023.

== Professional wins (16) ==
=== PGA Tour wins (13) ===
Legend
Major championships (3)
FedEx Cup playoff events (1)
Other PGA Tour (9)

No.	Date	Tournament	Winning score	To par	Margin of victory	Runner(s)-up
1	Jul 14, 2013	John Deere Classic	70-65-65-65=265	−19	Playoff	(Canada) David Hearn, (United States) Zach Johnson
2	Mar 15, 2015	Valspar Championship	70-67-68-69=274	−10	Playoff	(United States) Sean O'Hair, (United States) Patrick Reed
3	Apr 12, 2015	Masters Tournament	64-66-70-70=270	−18	4 strokes	(United States) Phil Mickelson, (England) Justin Rose
4	Jun 21, 2015	U.S. Open	68-67-71-69=275	−5	1 stroke	(United States) Dustin Johnson, (South Africa) Louis Oosthuizen
5	Jul 12, 2015	John Deere Classic (2)	71-64-61-68=264	−20	Playoff	(United States) Tom Gillis
6	Sep 27, 2015	Tour Championship	68-66-68-69=271	−9	4 strokes	(New Zealand) Danny Lee, (England) Justin Rose, (Sweden) Henrik Stenson
7	Jan 10, 2016	Hyundai Tournament of Champions	66-64-65-67=262	−30	8 strokes	(United States) Patrick Reed
8	May 29, 2016	Dean & DeLuca Invitational	67-66-65-65=263	−17	3 strokes	(United States) Harris English
9	Feb 12, 2017	AT&T Pebble Beach Pro-Am	68-65-65-70=268	−19	4 strokes	(United States) Kelly Kraft
10	Jun 25, 2017	Travelers Championship	63-69-66-70=268	−12	Playoff	(United States) Daniel Berger
11	Jul 23, 2017	The Open Championship	65-69-65-69=268	−12	3 strokes	(United States) Matt Kuchar
12	Apr 4, 2021	Valero Texas Open	67-70-67-66=270	−18	2 strokes	(United States) Charley Hoffman
13	Apr 17, 2022	RBC Heritage	69-68-68-66=271	−13	Playoff	(United States) Patrick Cantlay

PGA Tour playoff record (5–4)

No.	Year	Tournament	Opponent(s)	Result
1	2013	John Deere Classic	(Canada) David Hearn, (United States) Zach Johnson	Won with par on fifth extra hole
2	2013	Wyndham Championship	(United States) Patrick Reed	Lost to birdie on second extra hole
3	2015	Valspar Championship	(United States) Sean O'Hair, (United States) Patrick Reed	Won with birdie on third extra hole
4	2015	Shell Houston Open	(United States) J. B. Holmes, (United States) Johnson Wagner	Holmes won with par on second extra hole Spieth eliminated by par on first hole
5	2015	John Deere Classic	(United States) Tom Gillis	Won with par on second extra hole
6	2017	Travelers Championship	(United States) Daniel Berger	Won with birdie on first extra hole
7	2017	The Northern Trust	(United States) Dustin Johnson	Lost to birdie on first extra hole
8	2022	RBC Heritage	(United States) Patrick Cantlay	Won with par on first extra hole
9	2023	RBC Heritage	(England) Matt Fitzpatrick	Lost to birdie on third extra hole

=== PGA Tour of Australasia wins (2) ===
Legend
Flagship events (2)
Other PGA Tour of Australasia (0)

No.	Date	Tournament	Winning score	To par	Margin of victory	Runner(s)-up
1	Nov 30, 2014	Emirates Australian Open^{1}	67-72-69-63=271	−13	6 strokes	(Australia) Rod Pampling
2	Nov 20, 2016	Emirates Australian Open^{1} (2)	69-70-68-69=276	−12	Playoff	(Australia) Ashley Hall, (Australia) Cameron Smith

^{1}Co-sanctioned by the OneAsia Tour

PGA Tour of Australasia playoff record (1–0)

No.	Year	Tournament	Opponents	Result
1	2016	Emirates Australian Open	(Australia) Ashley Hall, (Australia) Cameron Smith	Won with birdie on first extra hole

=== Other wins (1) ===
No.	Date	Tournament	Winning score	To par	Margin of victory	Runner-up
1	Dec 7, 2014	Hero World Challenge	66-67-63-66=262	−26	10 strokes	(Sweden) Henrik Stenson

== Major championships ==
=== Wins (3) ===
Year	Championship	54 holes	Winning score	Margin	Runner(s)-up
2015	Masters Tournament	4 shot lead	−18 (64-66-70-70=270)	4 strokes	(United States) Phil Mickelson, (England) Justin Rose
2015	U.S. Open	Tied for lead	−5 (68-67-71-69=275)	1 stroke	(United States) Dustin Johnson, (South Africa) Louis Oosthuizen
2017	The Open Championship	3 shot lead	−12 (65-69-65-69=268)	3 strokes	(United States) Matt Kuchar

=== Results timeline ===
Results not in chronological order in 2020.

Tournament	2012	2013	2014	2015	2016	2017	2018
Masters Tournament			T2	1	T2	T11	3
U.S. Open	T21LA	CUT	T17	1	T37	T35	CUT
The Open Championship		T44	T36	T4	T30	1	T9
PGA Championship		CUT	CUT	2	T13	T28	T12

Tournament	2019	2020	2021	2022	2023	2024	2025	2026
Masters Tournament	T21	T46	T3	CUT	T4	CUT	T14	T12
PGA Championship	T3	T71	T30	T34	T29	T43	CUT	T18
U.S. Open	T65	CUT	T19	T37	CUT	T41	T23	T56
The Open Championship	T20	NT	2	T8	T23	T25	T40	CUT

Win
Top 10
Did not play

LA = low amateur
CUT = missed the half-way cut
"T" indicates a tie for a place
NT = no tournament due to COVID-19 pandemic

=== Summary ===
Tournament	Wins	2nd	3rd	Top-5	Top-10	Top-25	Events	Cuts made
Masters Tournament	1	2	2	6	6	10	13	11
PGA Championship	0	1	1	2	2	5	14	11
U.S. Open	1	0	0	1	1	5	15	11
The Open Championship	1	1	0	3	5	8	13	12
Totals	3	4	3	12	14	28	55	45

- Most consecutive cuts made – 13 (2015 Masters – 2018 Masters)
- Longest streak of top-10s – 5 (2015 Masters – 2016 Masters)

== Results in The Players Championship ==
Tournament	2014	2015	2016	2017	2018	2019
The Players Championship	T4	CUT	CUT	CUT	T41	CUT

Tournament	2020	2021	2022	2023	2024	2025	2026
The Players Championship	C	T48	CUT	T19	CUT	59	T32

Top 10

CUT = missed the halfway cut
"T" indicates a tie for a place
C = canceled after the first round due to the COVID-19 pandemic

== Results in World Golf Championships ==
Results not in chronological order before 2015.

Tournament	2013	2014	2015	2016	2017	2018	2019	2020	2021	2022	2023
Championship		T34	T17	T17	T12	T14	T54	T58			
Match Play		QF	R64	R16	T30	T17	T24	NT^{1}	R16	T35	T31
Invitational		49	T10	T3	T13	T60	T12	T30	T12		
Champions	17	T35	T7				T43	NT^{1}	NT^{1}	NT^{1}	

^{1}Cancelled due to COVID-19 pandemic

Top 10
Did not play

QF, R16, R32, R64 = Round in which player lost in match play
NT = No tournament
"T" = Tied
Note that the Championship and Invitational were discontinued from 2022. The Champions was discontinued from 2023.

== PGA Tour career summary ==
Season	Starts	Cuts made	Wins (majors)	2nd	3rd	Top-10	Top-25	Best finish	Earnings ($)	Money list rank	Scoring avg (adj)	Scoring rank
2010	2	1	0	0	0	0	1	T16	0	–	–	–
2011	1	1	0	0	0	0	0	T32	0	–	–	–
2012	5	3	0	0	0	0	1	T21	0	–	–	–
2013	23	18	1	3	0	9	13	1	3,879,820	10	69.67	9
2014	27	24	0	2	0	8	18	2	4,342,748	11	69.95	14
2015	25	21	5 (2)	4	1	15	19	1	12,030,465	1	68.94	1
2016	21	19	2	1	1	8	16	1	5,538,470	6	69.52	4
2017	23	20	3 (1)	3	2	12	17	1	9,433,033	2	68.85	1
2018	23	18	0	0	2	5	13	3	2,793,536	32	69.90	18
2019	23	19	0	0	1	4	8	T3	2,124,192	51	70.45	35
2020	17	14	0	0	0	3	4	T8	1,138,146	78	70.86	93
2021	25	21	1	2	2	9	14	1	6,470,482	6	70.118	24
2022	11	8	1	2	0	6	11	1	5,018,444	11	71.179	95
2023	24	16	0	1	0	7	10	2	7,240,044	27	70.150	30
Career*	250	203	13 (3)	18	9	86	156	1	60,009,379	7		

== U.S. national team appearances ==
Amateur

- Junior Ryder Cup: 2008 (winners), 2010 (winners)
- Walker Cup: 2011

Professional

- Presidents Cup: 2013 (winners), 2015 (winners), 2017 (winners), 2022 (winners)
- Ryder Cup: 2014, 2016 (winners), 2018, 2021 (winners), 2023

== See also ==
- List of men's major championships winning golfers
