= 2014–15 PGA Tour =

Golf tour season

2014–15 PGA Tour season
- Duration: October 9, 2014 – September 27, 2015
- Number of official events: 47
- Most wins: (Australia) Jason Day (5) (United States) Jordan Spieth (5)
- FedEx Cup: (United States) Jordan Spieth
- Money list: (United States) Jordan Spieth
- PGA Tour Player of the Year: (United States) Jordan Spieth
- PGA Player of the Year: (United States) Jordan Spieth
- Rookie of the Year: (United States) Daniel Berger

The 2014–15 PGA Tour was the 100th season of the PGA Tour, the main professional golf tour in the United States. It was also the 47th season since separating from the PGA of America, and the ninth edition of the FedEx Cup.

== Changes for 2014–15 ==
- One new event was added (Barbasol Championship) and the Sanderson Farms Championship made a return.
- Winners of the Arnold Palmer Invitational and Memorial Tournament were for the first time given three-year exemptions and invitations to the next three Players Championships.
- For the first time, the conditional status category (126th to 150th in the FedEx Cup) was regularly reshuffled, like the Web.com Tour graduate and past champion categories.

The McGladrey Classic was moved up two weeks from 2014. The CIMB Classic and WGC-HSBC Champions have each been moved back one week from 2014. The Sanderson Farms Championship became an alternate event to the WGC-HSBC Champions, instead of being an alternate to The Open Championship as in years previous. The new Barbasol Championship was an alternate event to The Open Championship. It also marked the first time the PGA Tour hosted an event in Alabama in 25 years, when the state hosted the 1990 PGA Championship. The WGC-Cadillac Match Play was moved back two and a half months to May, and relocated back to California, its primary home from 1999 to 2006.

== Schedule ==
The following table lists official events during the 2014–15 season.

| Date | Tournament | Location | Purse (US$) | Winner (Note: The number in parentheses after each winner's name is the number of PGA Tour events they had won up to and including that tournament. This information is only shown for PGA Tour members.) | OWGR points | Other tours (Note: ASA − Asian Tour.) | Notes |
|---|---|---|---|---|---|---|---|
| Oct 12 | Frys.com Open | California | 6,000,000 | (South Korea) Bae Sang-moon (2) | 36 | | |
| Oct 19 | Shriners Hospitals for Children Open | Nevada | 6,200,000 | (United States) Ben Martin (1) | 36 | | |
| Oct 26 | McGladrey Classic | Georgia | 5,600,000 | (United States) Robert Streb (1) | 32 | | |
| Nov 2 | CIMB Classic | Malaysia | 7,000,000 | (United States) Ryan Moore (4) | 42 | ASA | Limited-field event |
| Nov 9 | WGC-HSBC Champions | China | 8,500,000 | (United States) Bubba Watson (7) | 68 | | World Golf Championship |
| Nov 9 | Sanderson Farms Championship | Mississippi | 4,000,000 | (Canada) Nick Taylor (1) | 24 | | Alternate event |
| Nov 16 | OHL Classic at Mayakoba | Mexico | 6,100,000 | (United States) Charley Hoffman (3) | 24 | | |
| Jan 12 | Hyundai Tournament of Champions | Hawaii | 5,700,000 | (United States) Patrick Reed (4) | 46 | | Winners-only event |
| Jan 18 | Sony Open in Hawaii | Hawaii | 5,600,000 | (United States) Jimmy Walker (4) | 46 | | |
| Jan 25 | Humana Challenge | California | 5,700,000 | (United States) Bill Haas (6) | 46 | | Pro-Am |
| Feb 1 | Waste Management Phoenix Open | Arizona | 6,300,000 | (United States) Brooks Koepka (1) | 54 | | |
| Feb 8 | Farmers Insurance Open | California | 6,300,000 | (Australia) Jason Day (3) | 52 | | |
| Feb 15 | AT&T Pebble Beach National Pro-Am | California | 6,800,000 | (United States) Brandt Snedeker (7) | 46 | | Pro-Am |
| Feb 22 | Northern Trust Open | California | 6,700,000 | (United States) James Hahn (1) | 54 | | |
| Mar 2 | The Honda Classic | Florida | 6,100,000 | (Republic of Ireland) Pádraig Harrington (6) | 60 | | |
| Mar 8 | WGC-Cadillac Championship | Florida | 9,250,000 | (United States) Dustin Johnson (9) | 76 | | World Golf Championship |
| Mar 8 | Puerto Rico Open | Puerto Rico | 3,000,000 | (Germany) Alex Čejka (1) | 24 | | Alternate event |
| Mar 15 | Valspar Championship | Florida | 5,900,000 | (United States) Jordan Spieth (2) | 52 | | |
| Mar 22 | Arnold Palmer Invitational | Florida | 6,300,000 | (United States) Matt Every (2) | 60 | | Invitational |
| Mar 29 | Valero Texas Open | Texas | 6,200,000 | (United States) Jimmy Walker (5) | 52 | | |
| Apr 5 | Shell Houston Open | Texas | 6,600,000 | (United States) J. B. Holmes (4) | 54 | | |
| Apr 12 | Masters Tournament | Georgia | 10,000,000 | (United States) Jordan Spieth (3) | 100 | | Major championship |
| Apr 19 | RBC Heritage | South Carolina | 5,900,000 | (United States) Jim Furyk (17) | 52 | | Invitational |
| Apr 26 | Zurich Classic of New Orleans | Louisiana | 6,900,000 | (England) Justin Rose (7) | 40 | | |
| May 3 | WGC-Cadillac Match Play | California | 9,250,000 | (Northern Ireland) Rory McIlroy (10) | 76 | | World Golf Championship |
| May 10 | The Players Championship | Florida | 10,000,000 | (United States) Rickie Fowler (2) | 80 | | Flagship event |
| May 17 | Wells Fargo Championship | North Carolina | 7,100,000 | (Northern Ireland) Rory McIlroy (11) | 52 | | |
| May 24 | Crowne Plaza Invitational at Colonial | Texas | 6,500,000 | (United States) Chris Kirk (4) | 48 | | Invitational |
| May 31 | AT&T Byron Nelson | Texas | 7,100,000 | (Australia) Steven Bowditch (2) | 46 | | |
| Jun 7 | Memorial Tournament | Ohio | 6,200,000 | (Sweden) David Lingmerth (1) | 60 | | Invitational |
| Jun 14 | FedEx St. Jude Classic | Tennessee | 6,000,000 | (Argentina) Fabián Gómez (1) | 34 | | |
| Jun 21 | U.S. Open | Washington | 10,000,000 | (United States) Jordan Spieth (4) | 100 | | Major championship |
| Jun 28 | Travelers Championship | Connecticut | 6,400,000 | (United States) Bubba Watson (8) | 46 | | |
| Jul 5 | Greenbrier Classic | West Virginia | 6,700,000 | (New Zealand) Danny Lee (1) | 40 | | |
| Jul 12 | John Deere Classic | Illinois | 4,700,000 | (United States) Jordan Spieth (5) | 30 | | |
| Jul 19 | Barbasol Championship | Alabama | 3,500,000 | (United States) Scott Piercy (3) | 24 | | New tournament Alternate event |
| Jul 20 | The Open Championship | Scotland | £6,300,000 | (United States) Zach Johnson (12) | 100 | | Major championship |
| Jul 26 | RBC Canadian Open | Canada | 5,800,000 | (Australia) Jason Day (4) | 40 | | |
| Aug 2 | Quicken Loans National | Virginia | 6,700,000 | (United States) Troy Merritt (1) | 34 | | Invitational |
| Aug 9 | WGC-Bridgestone Invitational | Ohio | 9,250,000 | (Republic of Ireland) Shane Lowry (1) | 74 | | World Golf Championship |
| Aug 9 | Barracuda Championship | Nevada | 3,100,000 | (United States) J. J. Henry (3) | 24 | | Alternate event |
| Aug 16 | PGA Championship | Wisconsin | 10,000,000 | (Australia) Jason Day (5) | 100 | | Major championship |
| Aug 23 | Wyndham Championship | North Carolina | 5,400,000 | (United States) Davis Love III (21) | 40 | | |
| Aug 30 | The Barclays | New Jersey | 8,250,000 | (Australia) Jason Day (6) | 72 | | FedEx Cup playoff event |
| Sep 7 | Deutsche Bank Championship | Massachusetts | 8,250,000 | (United States) Rickie Fowler (3) | 72 | | FedEx Cup playoff event |
| Sep 20 | BMW Championship | Illinois | 8,250,000 | (Australia) Jason Day (7) | 72 | | FedEx Cup playoff event |
| Sep 27 | Tour Championship | Georgia | 8,250,000 | (United States) Jordan Spieth (6) | 58 | | FedEx Cup playoff event |

=== Unofficial events ===
The following events were sanctioned by the PGA Tour, but did not carry FedEx Cup points or official money, nor were wins official.

| Date | Tournament | Location | Purse ($) | Winner(s) | OWGR points | Notes |
|---|---|---|---|---|---|---|
| Oct 15 | PGA Grand Slam of Golf | Bermuda | 1,350,000 | (Germany) Martin Kaymer | n/a | Limited-field event |
| Dec 7 | Hero World Challenge | Florida | 3,500,000 | (United States) Jordan Spieth | 46 | Limited-field event |
| Dec 13 | Franklin Templeton Shootout | Florida | 3,100,000 | (Australia) Jason Day and (United States) Cameron Tringale | n/a | Team event |
| Jun 30 | CVS Health Charity Classic | Rhode Island | 1,500,000 | (United States) Keegan Bradley and (United States) Jon Curran | n/a | Team event |
| Oct 11 | Presidents Cup | South Korea | n/a | Team USA | n/a | Team event |

== Location of tournaments ==
Location of official tournaments of the 2014–15 PGA Tour in the continental United States and Canada.
600-point event (Players & Majors)
550-point event (World Golf Championships)
500-point event (Regular events)
300-point event (Alternate events)
FedEx Cup playoff event
Location of official tournaments of the 2014–15 PGA Tour outside the continental United States and Canada.
600-point event (Players & Majors)
550-point event (World Golf Championships)
500-point event (Regular events)
300-point event (Alternate events)

== FedEx Cup ==
=== Final standings ===
For full rankings, see 2015 FedEx Cup Playoffs.

Final top 10 players in the FedEx Cup:

| Position | Player | Points | Bonus money ($) |
|---|---|---|---|
| 1 | (United States) Jordan Spieth | 3,800 | 10,000,000 |
| 2 | (Sweden) Henrik Stenson | 2,307 | 3,000,000 |
| 3 | (Australia) Jason Day | 2,290 | 2,000,000 |
| 4 | (United States) Rickie Fowler | 1,838 | 1,500,000 |
| 5 | (United States) Bubba Watson | 1,680 | 1,000,000 |
| 6 | (United States) Zach Johnson | 1,450 | 800,000 |
| 7 | (United States) Dustin Johnson | 1,360 | 700,000 |
| 8 | (England) Justin Rose | 1,235 | 600,000 |
| 9 | (New Zealand) Danny Lee | 1,123 | 550,000 |
| 10 | (United States) Charley Hoffman | 992 | 500,000 |

== Money list ==
The money list was based on prize money won during the season, calculated in U.S. dollars.

| Position | Player | Prize money ($) |
|---|---|---|
| 1 | (United States) Jordan Spieth | 12,030,465 |
| 2 | (Australia) Jason Day | 9,403,330 |
| 3 | (United States) Bubba Watson | 6,876,797 |
| 4 | (United States) Rickie Fowler | 5,773,430 |
| 5 | (United States) Dustin Johnson | 5,509,467 |
| 6 | (England) Justin Rose | 5,462,677 |
| 7 | (Northern Ireland) Rory McIlroy | 4,863,312 |
| 8 | (United States) Zach Johnson | 4,801,487 |
| 9 | (Sweden) Henrik Stenson | 4,755,070 |
| 10 | (United States) Jimmy Walker | 4,521,350 |

== Awards ==
| Award | Winner | Ref. |
|---|---|---|
| PGA Tour Player of the Year (Jack Nicklaus Trophy) | (United States) Jordan Spieth | |
| PGA Player of the Year | (United States) Jordan Spieth | |
| Rookie of the Year | (United States) Daniel Berger | |
| Scoring leader (PGA Tour – Byron Nelson Award) | (United States) Jordan Spieth | |
| Scoring leader (PGA – Vardon Trophy) | (United States) Jordan Spieth | |
| PGA Tour Courage Award | (Australia) Jarrod Lyle | |

== See also ==
- 2014 in golf
- 2015 in golf
- 2015 Champions Tour
- 2015 Web.com Tour
