= Golf at the 2015 Games of the Small States of Europe =

Golf at the 2015 Games of the Small States of Europe was held at the Golfklúbbur Reykjavíkur, Reykjavík, Iceland from 3 to 6 June 2015.

== Medal summary ==
=== Medal table ===
Rank	Nation	Gold	Silver	Bronze	Total
1	Iceland (ISL)	4	0	2	6
2	Monaco (MON)	0	3	1	4
3	Malta (MLT)	0	1	0	1
4	Luxembourg (LUX)	0	0	1	1
Totals (4 entries)		4	4	4	12

=== Medalists ===
Event	Gold	Silver	Bronze
Men's individual	Kristján Einarsson (ISL)	Sandro Piaget (MON)	Haraldur Magnús (ISL)
Women's individual	Guðrún Björnsdóttir (ISL)	Sophie Sandolo (MON)	Karen Guðnadóttir (ISL)
Men's team	Iceland; Andri Björnsson; Haraldur Magnús; Kristján Einarsson	Malta; Andrew Borg; Daniel Holland; John Junior Ver Elst Micallef	Monaco; Frédéric Ruffier Meray; Luigi Zenere; Sandro Piaget
Women's team	Iceland; Sunna Víðisdóttir; Karen Guðnadóttir; Guðrún Björnsdóttir	Monaco; Helga Piaget; Sophie Halsall; Sophie Sandolo	Luxembourg; Mei Ping Yu; Nathalie Decker; Anne Schwartz

== Results ==
Legend

- DNS — Did not start
- DSQ — Disqualified

=== Men's ===
Rank	Athlete	Round				Total	To par
Rank	Athlete	1	2	3	4	Total	To par
1st place, gold medalist(s)	Kristján Einarsson (ISL)	68	69	64	77	278	−6
2nd place, silver medalist(s)	Sandro Piaget (MON)	73	71	66	72	282	−2
3rd place, bronze medalist(s)	Haraldur Magnús (ISL)	68	72	71	73	284	Even
4	Andri Björnsson (ISL)	72	70	73	71	286	+2
5	Kevin Esteve Rigaill (AND)	71	72	72	76	291	+7
6	Andrew Borg (MLT)	74	70	75	75	294	+10
7	Daniel Holland (MLT)	72	70	80	80	302	+18
8	John Junior Ver Elst Micallef (MLT)	82	72	71	78	303	+19
9	Casey Severiano Calmi (SMR)	73	78	73	80	304	+20
9	Tommaso Soragni (SMR)	77	72	75	80	304	+20
11	David Winandy (LUX)	74	78	74	82	307	+23
12	Ramon Armengol Whittaker (AND)	76	77	78	85	316	+32
12	Max Biwer (LUX)	77	78	74	87	316	+32
12	Luigi Zenere (MON)	77	81	78	80	316	+32
15	David Esteve Rigaill (AND)	76	82	82	84	324	+40
15	Lukas Schaper (LIE)	84	77	81	82	324	+40
17	Sebastian Lukas Schredt (LIE)	84	79	78	84	325	+41
17	Frédéric Ruffier Meray (MON)	84	80	79	82	325	+41
19	Patrick Rahme (LUX)	83	85	80	85	333	+49
19	Marco Pelliccioni (SMR)	85	86	80	88	339	+55
21	Christian Walch (LIE)	88	86	93	86	353	+69

=== Women's ===
Rank	Athlete	Round				Total	To par
Rank	Athlete	1	2	3	4	Total	To par
1st place, gold medalist(s)	Guðrún Björnsdóttir (ISL)	69	71	70	77	287	−1
2nd place, silver medalist(s)	Sophie Sandolo (MON)	73	73	70	76	292	+4
3rd place, bronze medalist(s)	Karen Guðnadóttir (ISL)	77	73	75	77	302	+14
4	Sunna Víðisdóttir (ISL)	74	78	76	75	303	+15
5	Marina Creus Ribas (AND)	77	88	81	77	323	+35
6	Sophie Halsall (MLT)	80	85	86	80	331	+43
7	Christine Tinner-Rampone (LIE)	88	83	79	833	333	+45
8	Anne Schwartz (LUX)	82	83	84	89	338	+50
9	Helga Piaget (MON)	80	88	80	91	339	+51
10	Nathalie Decker (LUX)	83	92	88	87	350	+62
10	Mei Ping Yu (LUX)	89	85	91	85	350	+62
12	Lisa Sele (LIE)	92	84	93	84	353	+65
