= Dell Technologies Championship =

Professional golf tournament

Coordinates: 41.982°N 71.223°W

Tournament information
- Location: Norton, Massachusetts
- Established: 2003
- Course: TPC Boston
- Par: 71
- Length: 7,216 yards (6,598 m)
- Tour: PGA Tour
- Format: Stroke play
- Prize fund: US$9,000,000
- Month played: August/September
- Final year: 2018

Tournament record score
- Aggregate: 262 Vijay Singh (2008); 262 Charley Hoffman (2010); 262 Henrik Stenson (2013)
- To par: −22 as above

Final champion
- (United States) Bryson DeChambeau

Location map
- Location in the United States Location in Massachusetts

The Dell Technologies Championship, originally the Deutsche Bank Championship, was a professional golf tournament on the PGA Tour that was played annually from 2003 to 2018. It was held in Norton, Massachusetts, United States, over the Labor Day weekend in late summer.

In 2007, the PGA Tour introduced the FedEx Cup and the Deutsche Bank Championship became one of four playoff events. The 2018 edition was the last time the event was staged as the FedEx Cup playoffs were reduced to three events the following season.

== History ==
Replacing the Air Canada Championship in British Columbia on the tour schedule, the tournament made its debut in 2003 as the Deutsche Bank Championship. It was held at the Tournament Players Club of Boston in Norton, Massachusetts, south-southwest of Boston. Unlike most PGA Tour events which are played Thursday through Sunday, this tournament was played Friday through Monday, with the final round on Labor Day.

It became part of the first-year FedEx Cup playoffs in 2007, with its purse increased to $7 million. The purse in 2018 was $9.0 million, with a winner's share of $1.62 million. As the second of the four playoff events, its field was limited to the top 100 players on the FedEx Cup points list. Points were amassed during the PGA Tour's regular season and the first playoff event, The Northern Trust, which took place the previous week in the New York City area.

Deutsche Bank sponsored the first 14 editions of the tournament, through 2016. In 2017, Dell Technologies, which had a new subsidiary Dell EMC headquartered in Massachusetts, took over as the title sponsor of the tournament. The event was managed by the Tiger Woods Foundation from 2013 to 2016, after which it was managed by the PGA Tour.

== Television ==
With the tournament's offset scheduling, Friday to Monday, network coverage has been over the final two scheduled rounds, Sunday and Monday; cable channels carry the Friday and Saturday rounds. The first network partner was ABC Sports from 2003 to 2006, though the 2006 event was covered under the "ESPN on ABC" banner. The event has been covered by NBC Sports from 2007 to 2018, though the 2011 and 2012 events were covered under the "Golf Channel on NBC" banner.

== Winners ==
PGA Tour (FedEx Cup Playoffs)	2007–2018
PGA Tour (Regular)	2003–2006

#	Year	Winner	Score	To par	Margin of victory	Runner(s)-up	Purse (US$)	Winner's share ($)
Dell Technologies Championship
16th	2018	(United States) Bryson DeChambeau	268	−16	2 strokes	(England) Justin Rose	9,000,000	1,620,000
15th	2017	(United States) Justin Thomas	267	−17	3 strokes	(United States) Jordan Spieth	8,750,000	1,575,000
Deutsche Bank Championship
14th	2016	(Northern Ireland) Rory McIlroy (2)	269	−15	2 strokes	(England) Paul Casey	8,500,000	1,530,000
13th	2015	(United States) Rickie Fowler	269	−15	1 stroke	(Sweden) Henrik Stenson	8,250,000	1,485,000
12th	2014	(United States) Chris Kirk	269	−15	2 strokes	(United States) Russell Henley (United States) Billy Horschel (Australia) Geoff Ogilvy	8,000,000	1,440,000
11th	2013	(Sweden) Henrik Stenson	262	−22	2 strokes	(United States) Steve Stricker	8,000,000	1,440,000
10th	2012	(Northern Ireland) Rory McIlroy	264	−20	1 stroke	(South Africa) Louis Oosthuizen	8,000,000	1,440,000
9th	2011	(United States) Webb Simpson	269	−15	Playoff	(United States) Chez Reavie	8,000,000	1,440,000
8th	2010	(United States) Charley Hoffman	262	−22	5 strokes	(Australia) Jason Day (England) Luke Donald (Australia) Geoff Ogilvy	7,500,000	1,350,000
7th	2009	(United States) Steve Stricker	267	−17	1 stroke	(United States) Jason Dufner (United States) Scott Verplank	7,500,000	1,350,000
6th	2008	(Fiji) Vijay Singh (2)	262	−22	5 strokes	(Canada) Mike Weir	7,000,000	1,260,000
5th	2007	(United States) Phil Mickelson	268	−16	2 strokes	(United States) Arron Oberholser (United States) Brett Wetterich (United States) Tiger Woods	7,000,000	1,260,000
4th	2006	(United States) Tiger Woods	268	−16	2 strokes	(Fiji) Vijay Singh	5,500,000	990,000
3rd	2005	(United States) Olin Browne	270	−14	1 stroke	(United States) Jason Bohn	5,500,000	990,000
2nd	2004	(Fiji) Vijay Singh	268	−16	3 strokes	(Australia) Adam Scott (United States) Tiger Woods	5,000,000	900,000
1st	2003	(Australia) Adam Scott	264	−20	4 strokes	(United States) Rocco Mediate	5,000,000	900,000

Note: Green highlight indicates scoring records.

=== Multiple winners ===
- Vijay Singh: 2004, 2008
- Rory McIlroy: 2012, 2016

== See also ==
- New England Classic – a PGA Tour event held in Massachusetts from 1969 through 1998.
