= 2017 PGA Championship =

Tournament information
- Dates: August 10–13, 2017
- Location: Charlotte, North Carolina, U.S. 35.116°N 80.842°W
- Course: Quail Hollow Club
- Organized by: PGA of America
- Tours: PGA Tour; European Tour; Japan Golf Tour

Statistics
- Par: 71
- Length: 7,600 yards (6,949 m)
- Field: 156 players, 75 after cut
- Cut: 147 (+5)
- Prize fund: $10,500,000 €8,875,888
- Winner's share: $1,890,000 €1,597,660

Champion
- (United States) Justin Thomas
- 276 (−8)

Location map
- Location in the United States Location in North Carolina

The 2017 PGA Championship was the 99th PGA Championship, held August 10–13 at Quail Hollow Club in Charlotte, North Carolina. This was the first major at Quail Hollow, which is a regular stop on the PGA Tour.

Early in the week of the tournament, it was announced that the championship will be held in May beginning in 2019.

Justin Thomas won his first career major title, two strokes ahead of runners-up Francesco Molinari, Louis Oosthuizen, and Patrick Reed.

== Media ==
In the United States, the Championship was televised by CBS, with weekday and early weekend coverage on TNT. It was televised live in the United Kingdom by the BBC who secured the rights over Sky Sports who had previously screened the event since 1992.

== Course layout ==
Hole	Yards	Par	Hole	Yards	Par
1	524	4	10	592	5
2	452	4	11	462	4
3	483	4	12	456	4
4	184	3	13	208	3
5	449	4	14	344	4
6	249	3	15	577	5
7	546	5	16	506	4
8	346	4	17	223	3
9	505	4	18	494	4
Out	3,738	35	In	3,862	36
Source:		Total		7,600	71

The course hosts the Wells Fargo Championship on the PGA Tour (2003–present), though not in 2017; in 2016, it played as a par-72 at 7,575 yards (6,927 m). It was also the home of the tour's Kemper Open (1969–1979) and the senior tour's PaineWebber World Seniors Invitational in the 1980s.

Under the direction of Tom Fazio, Quail Hollow underwent an aggressive 90-day renovation in 2016 that modified four holes and added Bermuda grass. It commenced during the final round of the Wells Fargo Championship on Sunday, May 8. Thousands of trees were removed, as the former first two holes were combined into a new first hole, and the old fifth hole was divided between the new fourth and fifth holes.

== Field ==
The following qualification criteria were used to select the field. Each player is listed according to the first category by which he qualified with additional categories in which he qualified shown in parentheses.

1. All former PGA Champions

- Rich Beem
- Keegan Bradley (8)
- John Daly
- Jason Day (6,8)
- Jason Dufner (8,10)
- Pádraig Harrington (6)
- Davis Love III
- Rory McIlroy (4,8,9,10)
- Shaun Micheel
- Phil Mickelson (4,8,9)
- Vijay Singh
- Jimmy Walker (6,8,9)
- Yang Yong-eun
- Martin Kaymer (3,6,9) did not play due to a shoulder injury.
- David Toms did not play.
- The following former champions did not enter: Paul Azinger, Mark Brooks, Jack Burke Jr., Steve Elkington, Dow Finsterwald, Raymond Floyd, Doug Ford, Al Geiberger, Wayne Grady, David Graham, Hubert Green, Don January, John Mahaffey, Larry Nelson, Bobby Nichols, Jack Nicklaus, Gary Player, Nick Price, Jeff Sluman, Dave Stockton, Hal Sutton, Lee Trevino, Bob Tway, Lanny Wadkins, Tiger Woods

2. Last five Masters Champions

- Sergio García (8,9)
- Adam Scott (8)
- Jordan Spieth (3,4,6,8,9,10)
- Bubba Watson
- Danny Willett (9)

3. Last five U.S. Open Champions

- Dustin Johnson (8,9,10)
- Brooks Koepka (6,8,9,10)
- Justin Rose (8,9,11)

4. Last five Open Champions

- Zach Johnson (9)
- Henrik Stenson (6,8,9)

5. Current Senior PGA Champion

- Bernhard Langer did not play.

6. Top 15 and ties from the 2016 PGA Championship

- Paul Casey (8)
- Branden Grace (8)
- Emiliano Grillo (8)
- Tyrrell Hatton
- Hideki Matsuyama (8,10)
- William McGirt (8)
- Patrick Reed (8,9,10)
- Webb Simpson (8)
- Robert Streb
- Daniel Summerhays

7. 20 low scorers in the 2017 PGA Professional Championship

- Alex Beach
- Rich Berberian, Jr.
- Jamie Broce
- Paul Claxton
- Stuart Deane
- Matt Dobyns
- Greg Gregory
- Jaysen Hansen
- Scott Hebert
- Dave McNabb
- Chris Moody
- David Muttitt
- Rod Perry
- Kenny Pigman
- Adam Rainaud
- Mike Small
- Brian Smock
- Omar Uresti
- Ryan Vermeer
- J. J. Wood

8. Top 70 leaders in official money standings from the 2016 RBC Canadian Open to the 2017 RBC Canadian Open

- Daniel Berger (10)
- Wesley Bryan (10)
- Rafa Cabrera-Bello (9)
- Bud Cauley
- Kevin Chappell (10)
- Tony Finau
- Tommy Fleetwood
- Rickie Fowler (9,10)
- Lucas Glover
- Bill Haas
- Adam Hadwin (10)
- James Hahn
- Brian Harman (10)
- Russell Henley (10)
- Charley Hoffman
- J. B. Holmes (9)
- Billy Horschel (10)
- Charles Howell III
- Mackenzie Hughes (10)
- Kang Sung-hoon
- Kim Si-woo (10)
- Kevin Kisner (10)
- Russell Knox (10)
- Kelly Kraft
- Matt Kuchar (9)
- Martin Laird
- Danny Lee
- Marc Leishman (10)
- Luke List
- Jamie Lovemark
- Francesco Molinari
- Ryan Moore (9,10)
- Kevin Na
- Sean O'Hair
- Louis Oosthuizen
- Pat Perez (10)
- Thomas Pieters (9)
- Ian Poulter
- Jon Rahm (10)
- Patrick Rodgers
- Xander Schauffele (10)
- Charl Schwartzel
- Cameron Smith (10)
- Kyle Stanley (10)
- Brendan Steele (10)
- Hudson Swafford (10)
- Justin Thomas (10)
- Jhonattan Vegas (10)
- Gary Woodland
- Brandt Snedeker (8,9) did not play due to a rib injury.

9. Members of the United States and Europe 2016 Ryder Cup teams (provided they are ranked in the top 100 in the Official World Golf Ranking on July 30)

- Matt Fitzpatrick
- Andy Sullivan
- Lee Westwood
- Chris Wood

10. Winners of tournaments co-sponsored or approved by the PGA Tour since the 2016 PGA Championship

- Jonas Blixt
- Bryson DeChambeau
- Cody Gribble
- Grayson Murray
- Rod Pampling
- D. A. Points
- Chris Stroud

11. Winner of the 2016 Olympic Golf Tournament

12. Special invitations

- An Byeong-hun
- Thomas Bjørn
- Patrick Cantlay
- Nicolas Colsaerts
- Graham DeLaet
- Luke Donald
- Ernie Els
- Ross Fisher
- Ryan Fox
- Dylan Frittelli
- Jim Furyk
- Scott Hend
- Jim Herman
- Yuta Ikeda
- Thongchai Jaidee
- Andrew Johnston
- Kim Kyung-tae
- Søren Kjeldsen
- Satoshi Kodaira
- Anirban Lahiri
- Pablo Larrazábal
- Alexander Lévy
- Li Haotong
- David Lingmerth
- Shane Lowry
- Joost Luiten
- Graeme McDowell
- Alex Norén
- Thorbjørn Olesen
- Jordan Smith
- Song Young-han
- Richard Sterne
- Brandon Stone
- Steve Stricker
- Hideto Tanihara
- Peter Uihlein
- Wang Jeung-hun
- Bernd Wiesberger
- Fabrizio Zanotti

13. Players below 70th place in official money standings, to fill the field

- Jason Kokrak

Alternates (category 13)

1. Scott Brown (77th in standings; replaced David Toms)
2. Chez Reavie (79, took spot reserved for WGC-Bridgestone Invitational winner)
3. ~~Scott Piercy~~ (80, did not play)
4. Chris Kirk (81, replaced Brandt Snedeker)

== Round summaries ==
=== First round ===
Thursday, August 10, 2017

Kevin Kisner and Thorbjørn Olesen were the co-leaders at 67 (−4), with five players one shot behind.

Place	Player	Score	To par
T1	(United States) Kevin Kisner	67	−4
T1	(Denmark) Thorbjørn Olesen	67	−4
T3	(United States) Brooks Koepka	68	−3
T3	(United States) Grayson Murray	68	−3
T3	(United States) D. A. Points	68	−3
T3	(United States) Chris Stroud	68	−3
T3	(United States) Gary Woodland	68	−3
T8	(United States) Bud Cauley	69	−2
T8	(England) Paul Casey	69	−2
T8	(United States) Tony Finau	69	−2
T8	(United States) Rickie Fowler	69	−2
T8	(United States) Brian Harman	69	−2
T8	(United States) Jim Herman	69	−2
T8	(United States) Patrick Reed	69	−2

=== Second round ===
Friday, August 11, 2017
Saturday, August 12, 2017

Following a weather delay of nearly two hours in the late afternoon, play was suspended at 8:11 pm EDT due to darkness, with 25 players remaining on the course. On the leaderboard, only Chris Stroud was affected, two-under for his round with five holes remaining. Play resumed at 7:30 am on Saturday.

Place	Player	Score	To par
T1	(United States) Kevin Kisner	67-67=134	−8
T1	(Japan) Hideki Matsuyama	70-64=134	−8
T3	(Australia) Jason Day	70-66=136	−6
T3	(United States) Chris Stroud	68-68=136	−6
T5	(Italy) Francesco Molinari	73-64=137	−5
T5	(South Africa) Louis Oosthuizen	70-67=137	−5
T7	(England) Paul Casey	69-70=139	−3
T7	(United States) Rickie Fowler	69-70=139	−3
T7	(United States) Justin Thomas	73-66=139	−3
10	(South Korea) An Byeong-hun	71-69=140	−2

=== Third round ===
Saturday, August 12, 2017

With the second round completed on Saturday morning, the third round began at 9:50 am EDT in groups of three at ten-minute intervals, with the final group at 2:00 pm.

Place	Player	Score	To par
1	(United States) Kevin Kisner	67-67-72=206	−7
T2	(Japan) Hideki Matsuyama	70-64-73=207	−6
T2	(United States) Chris Stroud	68-68-71=207	−6
T4	(South Africa) Louis Oosthuizen	70-67-71=208	−5
T4	(United States) Justin Thomas	73-66-69=208	−5
6	(United States) Grayson Murray	68-73-69=210	−3
T7	(United States) Scott Brown	73-68-70=211	−2
T7	(Canada) Graham DeLaet	70-73-68=211	−2
T7	(Italy) Francesco Molinari	73-64-74=211	−2
T7	(United States) Patrick Reed	69-73-69=211	−2
T7	(United States) Gary Woodland	68-74-69=211	−2

=== Final round ===
Sunday, August 13, 2017

==== Summary ====
Entering the final round with a one-stroke lead, Kevin Kisner failed to record a birdie on the front nine and bogeyed the par-5 7th after hitting his approach into the water. Hideki Matsuyama birdied both 6 and 7 to tie Kisner. Justin Thomas began the round two back and moved into a tie for the lead with a 36-foot (11 m) birdie putt at the 9th. Chris Stroud also birdied the ninth to tie, while Francesco Molinari's run of four birdies in five holes on his back nine meant that five players were atop the leaderboard at seven under.

At the par-5 tenth, Thomas' putt for birdie paused on the lip of the cup for several seconds before falling in. He then chipped in at 13 for another birdie. At the par-3 17th, he hit his approach to 14 feet (4.3 m) and converted the birdie opportunity to get to nine under. Matsuyama birdied the tenth to take solo possession of the lead, but made five bogeys to finish and fell to five under. Kisner made his first birdie of the day at 10, but followed with two more bogeys. He managed to birdie both 14 and 15 before three-putting for bogey at the 16th. After a par at 17, Kisner needed to hole his approach from the fairway on the last to force a playoff, but found the water and made double bogey.

In the penultimate pairing and leading by three on the final tee, Thomas drove into a fairway bunker and then played conservatively. His third shot from the rough was to the right side of the green; he sank his short putt for bogey for 68 (−3) and 276 (−8). Patrick Reed had three birdies on the back nine to get to within a shot of the lead, but bogeyed the 18th after finding a fairway bunker off the tee and finished tied for second, two strokes behind Thomas. Molinari's chances were diminished when he also drove into a bunker at 16 and failed to get up-and-down. Louis Oosthuizen holed out from 34 yards on the par-5 15th for an eagle and birdied 18 to tie Reed and Molinari for second. With the finish Oosthuizen became the seventh golfer to finish runner-up in all four major championships. Stroud played the back nine in six over to fall to a tie for ninth.

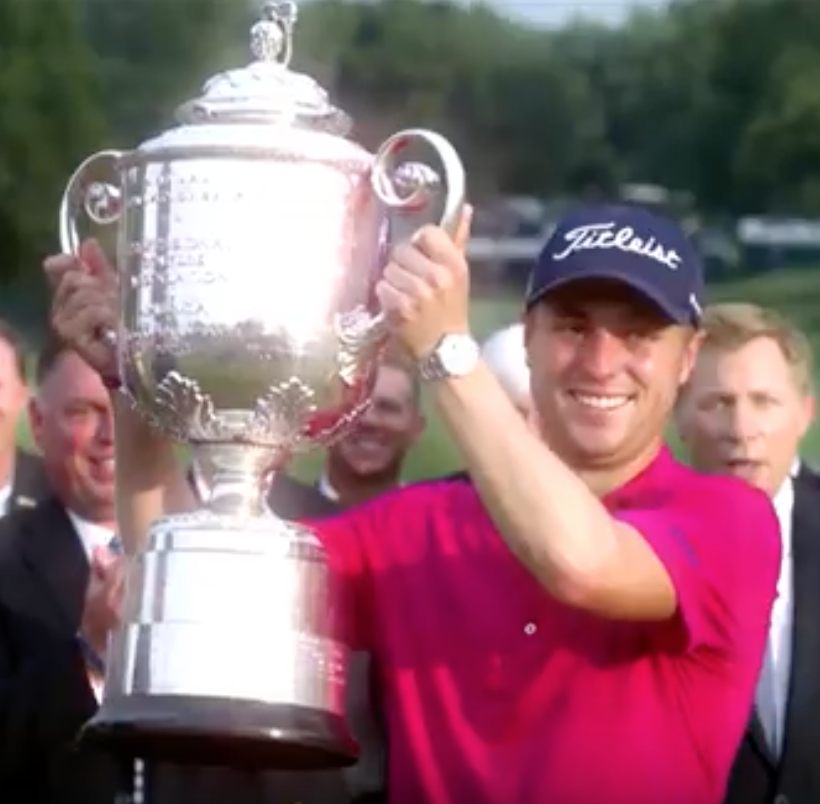
Thomas with the Wanamaker Trophy

==== Final leaderboard ====
Champion
Crystal Bowl winner (leading PGA Club Pro)
(c) = past champion

Note: Top 15 and ties qualify for the 2018 PGA Championship; top 4 and ties qualify for the 2018 Masters Tournament

Place	Player	Score	To par	Money ($)
1	(United States) Justin Thomas	73-66-69-68=276	−8	1,890,000
T2	(Italy) Francesco Molinari	73-64-74-67=278	−6	784,000
T2	(South Africa) Louis Oosthuizen	70-67-71-70=278	−6	784,000
T2	(United States) Patrick Reed	69-73-69-67=278	−6	784,000
T5	(United States) Rickie Fowler	69-70-73-67=279	−5	388,500
T5	(Japan) Hideki Matsuyama	70-64-73-72=279	−5	388,500
T7	(Canada) Graham DeLaet	70-73-68-69=280	−4	317,500
T7	(United States) Kevin Kisner	67-67-72-74=280	−4	317,500
T9	(Australia) Jason Day (c)	70-66-77-70=283	−1	250,000
T9	(United States) Matt Kuchar	71-74-70-68=283	−1	250,000
T9	(England) Jordan Smith	70-75-70-68=283	−1	250,000
T9	(United States) Chris Stroud	68-68-71-76=283	−1	250,000

Leaderboard below the top 10
Place	Player	Score	To par	Money ($)
T13	(United States) Scott Brown	73-68-70-73=284	E	160,000
T13	(England) Paul Casey	69-70-74-71=284	E	160,000
T13	(United States) James Hahn	73-70-71-70=284	E	160,000
T13	(United States) Brian Harman	69-75-71-69=284	E	160,000
T13	(United States) Dustin Johnson	70-74-73-67=284	E	160,000
T13	(United States) Brooks Koepka	68-73-74-69=284	E	160,000
T13	(Australia) Marc Leishman	75-71-71-67=284	E	160,000
T13	(United States) Ryan Moore	71-71-73-69=284	E	160,000
T13	(Sweden) Henrik Stenson	74-70-70-70=284	E	160,000
T22	(Northern Ireland) Rory McIlroy (c)	72-72-73-68=285	+1	89,166
T22	(United States) Grayson Murray	68-73-69-75=285	+1	89,166
T22	(England) Ian Poulter	74-71-71-69=285	+1	89,166
T22	(United States) Chez Reavie	72-70-70-73=285	+1	89,166
T22	(United States) Robert Streb	74-70-70-71=285	+1	89,166
T22	(United States) Gary Woodland	68-74-69-74=285	+1	89,166
T28	(South Korea) An Byeong-hun	71-69-74-72=286	+2	64,200
T28	(United States) J. B. Holmes	74-73-67-72=286	+2	64,200
T28	(United States) Pat Perez	70-76-69-71=286	+2	64,200
T28	(United States) Jordan Spieth	72-73-71-70=286	+2	64,200
T28	(South Africa) Richard Sterne	73-72-70-71=286	+2	64,200
T33	(United States) Keegan Bradley (c)	74-70-73-70=287	+3	47,000
T33	(United States) Patrick Cantlay	72-71-72-72=287	+3	47,000
T33	(United States) Bud Cauley	69-74-74-70=287	+3	47,000
T33	(United States) Kevin Chappell	72-75-69-71=287	+3	47,000
T33	(United States) Bryson DeChambeau	73-71-72-71=287	+3	47,000
T33	(United States) Lucas Glover	75-70-72-70=287	+3	47,000
T33	(United States) Jason Kokrak	75-70-72-70=287	+3	47,000
T33	(United States) Jamie Lovemark	74-71-72-70=287	+3	47,000
T33	(United States) Sean O'Hair	71-75-70-71=287	+3	47,000
T33	(United States) Webb Simpson	76-70-72-69=287	+3	47,000
T33	(England) Chris Wood	72-72-70-73=287	+3	47,000
T44	(United States) Tony Finau	69-74-71-74=288	+4	32,125
T44	(United States) Jim Herman	69-75-72-72=288	+4	32,125
T44	(South Korea) Kang Sung-hoon	70-71-71-76=288	+4	32,125
T44	(Denmark) Thorbjørn Olesen	67-78-71-72=288	+4	32,125
T48	(United States) Charley Hoffman	75-71-73-70=289	+5	25,900
T48	(United States) Billy Horschel	76-70-69-74=289	+5	25,900
T48	(United States) Zach Johnson	71-73-71-74=289	+5	25,900
T48	(Japan) Satoshi Kodaira	71-76-67-75=289	+5	25,900
T48	(Republic of Ireland) Shane Lowry	74-69-74-72=289	+5	25,900
T48	(South Africa) Charl Schwartzel	74-70-72-73=289	+5	25,900
T54	(New Zealand) Ryan Fox	75-66-71-78=290	+6	22,875
T54	(United States) Bill Haas	75-69-73-73=290	+6	22,875
T54	(United States) D. A. Points	68-73-74-75=290	+6	22,875
T54	(United States) Steve Stricker	75-70-72-73=290	+6	22,875
T58	(United States) Jason Dufner (c)	74-72-72-73=291	+7	21,800
T58	(United States) Kelly Kraft	73-73-71-74=291	+7	21,800
T58	(Spain) Jon Rahm	70-75-71-75=291	+7	21,800
T61	(England) Tommy Fleetwood	70-75-73-74=292	+8	21,300
T61	(Australia) Adam Scott	71-76-74-71=292	+8	21,300
T63	(South Africa) Dylan Frittelli	73-71-77-72=293	+9	20,800
T63	(United States) Cody Gribble	72-75-74-72=293	+9	20,800
T63	(Sweden) David Lingmerth	72-73-71-77=293	+9	20,800
66	(Fiji) Vijay Singh (c)	75-70-79-70=294	+10	20,400
T67	(South Korea) Kim Kyung-tae	73-72-75-75=295	+11	19,900
T67	(Sweden) Alex Norén	74-69-75-77=295	+11	19,900
T67	(Japan) Hideto Tanihara	71-75-74-75=295	+11	19,900
T67	(England) Lee Westwood	73-72-75-75=295	+11	19,900
T71	(United States) Russell Henley	75-71-77-73=296	+11	19,450
T71	(United States) Daniel Summerhays	76-67-77-76=296	+11	19,450
T73	(United States) Charles Howell III	78-69-78-72=297	+12	19,250
T73	(United States) Omar Uresti	74-70-80-73=297	+12	19,250
75	(India) Anirban Lahiri	72-73-76-78=299	+15	19,100
CUT	(England) Ross Fisher	75-73=148	+6	
CUT	(Australia) Scott Hend	72-76=148	+6	
CUT	(China) Li Haotong	73-75=148	+6	
CUT	(United States) Kevin Na	79-69=148	+6	
CUT	(England) Justin Rose	76-72=148	+6	
CUT	(United States) Peter Uihlein	74-74=148	+6	
CUT	(South Korea) Wang Jeung-hun	73-75=148	+6	
CUT	(Austria) Bernd Wiesberger	73-75=148	+6	
CUT	(United States) Daniel Berger	73-76=149	+7	
CUT	(Spain) Rafa Cabrera-Bello	74-75=149	+7	
CUT	(England) Luke Donald	76-73=149	+7	
CUT	(England) Tyrrell Hatton	77-72=149	+7	
CUT	(Scotland) Martin Laird	77-72=149	+7	
CUT	(France) Alexander Lévy	75-74=149	+7	
CUT	(United States) Luke List	75-74=149	+7	
CUT	(Netherlands) Joost Luiten	76-73=149	+7	
CUT	(Northern Ireland) Graeme McDowell	73-76=149	+7	
CUT	(United States) Hudson Swafford	77-72=149	+7	
CUT	(United States) Bubba Watson	77-72=149	+7	
CUT	(Belgium) Nicolas Colsaerts	75-75=150	+8	
CUT	(South Africa) Ernie Els	80-70=150	+8	
CUT	(England) Matt Fitzpatrick	76-74=150	+8	
CUT	(Spain) Sergio García	75-75=150	+8	
CUT	(Canada) Mackenzie Hughes	78-72=150	+8	
CUT	(Scotland) Russell Knox	77-73=150	+8	
CUT	(United States) William McGirt	77-73=150	+8	
CUT	(United States) Shaun Micheel (c)	73-77=150	+8	
CUT	(United States) Brendan Steele	74-76=150	+8	
CUT	(Venezuela) Jhonattan Vegas	78-72=150	+8	
CUT	(United States) Jimmy Walker (c)	81-69=150	+8	
CUT	(Sweden) Jonas Blixt	74-77=151	+9	
CUT	(South Africa) Branden Grace	77-74=151	+9	
CUT	(Republic of Ireland) Pádraig Harrington (c)	79-72=151	+9	
CUT	(Japan) Yuta Ikeda	72-79=151	+9	
CUT	(Denmark) Søren Kjeldsen	73-78=151	+9	
CUT	(Spain) Pablo Larrazábal	77-74=151	+9	
CUT	(United States) Wesley Bryan	74-78=152	+10	
CUT	(United States) Jim Furyk	76-76=152	+10	
CUT	(Argentina) Emiliano Grillo	78-74=152	+10	
CUT	(United States) Kyle Stanley	76-76=152	+10	
CUT	(England) Andy Sullivan	78-74=152	+10	
CUT	(England) Danny Willett	73-79=152	+10	
CUT	(United States) Rich Berberian Jr.	79-74=153	+11	
CUT	(United States) John Daly (c)	74-79=153	+11	
CUT	(United States) Greg Gregory	77-76=153	+11	
CUT	(Thailand) Thongchai Jaidee	80-73=153	+11	
CUT	(United States) Davis Love III (c)	78-75=153	+11	
CUT	(United States) Phil Mickelson (c)	79-74=153	+11	
CUT	(Paraguay) Fabrizio Zanotti	80-73=153	+11	
CUT	(United States) Rich Beem (c)	82-72=154	+12	
CUT	(United States) Matt Dobyns	76-78=154	+12	
CUT	(United States) Jaysen Hansen	84-70=154	+12	
CUT	(New Zealand) Danny Lee	76-78=154	+12	
CUT	(Canada) Adam Hadwin	79-76=155	+13	
CUT	(United States) Kenny Pigman	76-79=155	+13	
CUT	(United States) Xander Schauffele	74-81=155	+13	
CUT	(South Korea) Yang Yong-eun (c)	76-79=155	+13	
CUT	(Denmark) Thomas Bjørn	79-77=156	+14	
CUT	(United States) Chris Kirk	80-76=156	+14	
CUT	(United States) Dave McNabb	78-78=156	+14	
CUT	(Australia) Rod Pampling	77-79=156	+14	
CUT	(Belgium) Thomas Pieters	79-77=156	+14	
CUT	(United States) Patrick Rodgers	79-77=156	+14	
CUT	(United States) J. J. Wood	78-78=156	+14	
CUT	(United States) Jamie Broce	79-78=157	+15	
CUT	(United States) Scott Hebert	83-74=157	+15	
CUT	(Australia) Cameron Smith	75-82=157	+15	
CUT	(South Korea) Song Young-han	80-77=157	+15	
CUT	(United States) Alex Beach	79-80=159	+17	
CUT	(United States) Chris Moody	81-78=159	+17	
CUT	(United States) Adam Rainaud	81-78=159	+17	
CUT	(United States) Mike Small	80-79=159	+17	
CUT	(South Africa) Brandon Stone	79-80=159	+17	
CUT	(United States) Ryan Vermeer	82-79=161	+19	
CUT	(United States) Rod Perry	82-81=163	+21	
CUT	(United States) Paul Claxton	82-83=165	+23	
CUT	(United States) Stuart Deane	84-81=165	+23	
CUT	(United States) David Muttitt	84-83=167	+25	
WD	(United States) Brian Smock	77	+6	
WD	(England) Andrew Johnston	78	+7	
WD	(South Korea) Kim Si-woo	79	+8	

==== Scorecard ====
Hole	1	2	3	4	5	6	7	8	9	10	11	12	13	14	15	16	17	18
Par	4	4	4	3	4	3	5	4	4	5	4	4	3	4	5	4	3	4
(United States) Thomas	−4	−5	−4	−4	−4	−4	−5	−5	−6	−7	−7	−7	−8	−8	−8	−8	−9	−8
(Italy) Molinari	−3	−3	−3	−3	−3	−3	−4	−4	−4	−3	−4	−5	−5	−6	−7	−6	−6	−6
(South Africa) Oosthuizen	−4	−4	−4	−4	−4	−4	−5	−5	−5	−5	−4	−4	−4	−4	−6	−5	−5	−6
(United States) Reed	−2	−1	−2	−3	−2	−3	−4	−4	−4	−5	−5	−5	−5	−6	−7	−7	−7	−6
(United States) Fowler	−1	E	E	−1	−1	−1	−2	−1	−1	−1	−1	−2	−3	−4	−5	−5	−5	−5
(Japan) Matsuyama	−6	−5	−5	−5	−5	−6	−7	−7	−7	−8	−7	−6	−5	−6	−7	−6	−6	−5
(Canada) DeLaet	−2	−1	−2	−1	−1	−1	−2	−2	−3	−3	−3	−3	−2	−3	−3	−3	−3	−4
(United States) Kisner	−7	−7	−7	−7	−7	−7	−6	−6	−6	−7	−6	−5	−5	−6	−7	−6	−6	−4
(United States) Stroud	−5	−5	−5	−6	−6	−5	−5	−6	−7	−7	−6	−6	−5	−5	−5	−3	−2	−1

Cumulative tournament scores, relative to par

Eagle	Birdie	Bogey	Double bogey
