= Cameron Davis (golfer) =

Australian professional golfer

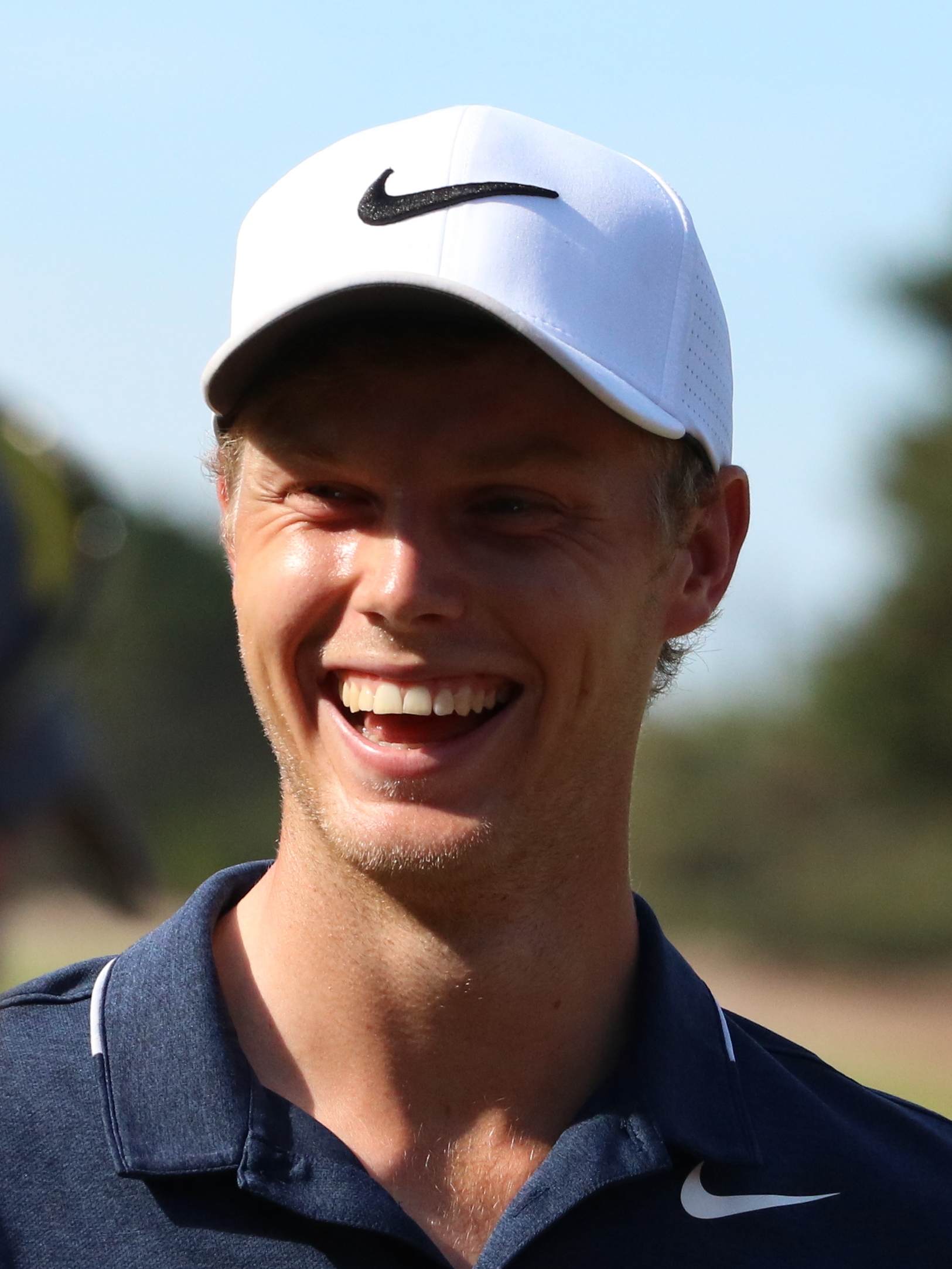
- Davis in 2017

Personal information
- Full name: Cameron Hugh Davis
- Nationality: Australia
- Born: 21 February 1995 (age 31) Sydney, Australia
- Height: 6 ft 4 in (1.93 m)
- Weight: 180 lb (82 kg; 13 st)

Career
- Sport: Golf
- Turned professional: 2016
- Current tours: PGA Tour of Australasia; PGA Tour
- Former tours: PGA Tour Canada; Web.com Tour
- Professional wins: 5
- Highest ranking: 38 (30 June 2024) (as of 25 October 2026)

Number of wins by tour
- PGA Tour: 2
- PGA Tour of Australasia: 1
- Korn Ferry Tour: 1
- Other: 1

Best results in major championships
- Masters Tournament: T12: 2024
- PGA Championship: T4: 2023
- U.S. Open: T64: 2025
- The Open Championship: T39: 2018

Cameron Hugh Davis (born 21 February 1995) is an Australian professional golfer. He had a successful amateur career, winning the Australian Amateur and the individual and team events at the Eisenhower Trophy. He has played regularly on the PGA Tour since 2018, and won the 2021 and 2024 Rocket Mortgage Classic.

== Amateur career ==
Being brought up in Sydney, Davis attended Wakehurst Public School and Davidson High displaying golf ability at an early age. He had a successful amateur career. In 2015 he won the Australian Amateur and was a runner-up in the Asia-Pacific Amateur Championship, behind Jin Cheng. In 2016 he was part of the Australian team who won the Eisenhower Trophy in Mexico and he was also the individual winner. The Australian team won the team event by 19 strokes and Davis finished 2 strokes ahead of fellow-Australian Curtis Luck in the individual event.

== Professional career ==
Davis turned professional in late 2016. He played in the OHL Classic at Mayakoba on the PGA Tour and finished tied for 15th place.

Davis qualified for the 2017 PGA Tour Canada by finishing fourth in the Q-school. He was tied for 14th in his first event, the Freedom 55 Financial Open, but had a disappointing season, finishing 76th on the tour's rankings and losing his card. In November he won the Emirates Australian Open, a stroke ahead of Jonas Blixt and Matt Jones, after a final round 64 for his first professional win and automatic qualification into the 2018 Open Championship, as the tournament was part of the Open Qualifying Series. Davis also had status on the Web.com Tour for 2018 after reaching the final round of Q School, despite starting at the First Stage. Davis won the 2018 Nashville Golf Open, and finished 7th on the Web.com Tour money list to secure his PGA Tour card.

Davis struggled during the 2018-2019 PGA Tour season, and finished 160th on the FedEx Cup points list. However, he rebounded and finished 84th during the 2019–20 season.

In July 2021, Davis earned his first PGA Tour victory by defeating Troy Merritt and Joaquín Niemann in a playoff at the Rocket Mortgage Classic. He ended the season 37th on the FedEx Cup points list.

In September 2022, Davis was selected for the International team in the 2022 Presidents Cup at Quail Hollow Club; he played all five matches, winning two and losing three.

In June 2024, Davis won the Rocket Mortgage Classic for the second time in his career. Davis won by one shot over Akshay Bhatia, who three-putted and made bogey on the final hole.

== Amateur wins ==
- 2014 Victorian Amateur Championship
- 2015 Australian Amateur, New South Wales Medal
- 2016 Eisenhower Trophy (individual title)

== Professional wins (5) ==
=== PGA Tour wins (2) ===
No.	Date	Tournament	Winning score	To par	Margin of victory	Runners-up
1	4 Jul 2021	Rocket Mortgage Classic	68-68-67-67=270	−18	Playoff	(United States) Troy Merritt, (Chile) Joaquín Niemann
2	30 Jun 2024	Rocket Mortgage Classic (2)	68-66-66-70=270	−18	1 stroke	(United States) Akshay Bhatia, (Australia) Min Woo Lee, (England) Aaron Rai, (United States) Davis Thompson

PGA Tour playoff record (1–0)

No.	Year	Tournament	Opponents	Result
1	2021	Rocket Mortgage Classic	(United States) Troy Merritt, (Chile) Joaquín Niemann	Won with par on fifth extra hole Niemann eliminated by par on first hole

=== PGA Tour of Australasia wins (1) ===
Legend
Flagship events (1)
Other PGA Tour of Australasia (0)

No.	Date	Tournament	Winning score	To par	Margin of victory	Runners-up
1	26 Nov 2017	Emirates Australian Open	63-72-74-64=273	−11	1 stroke	(Sweden) Jonas Blixt, (Australia) Matt Jones

=== Web.com Tour wins (1) ===
No.	Date	Tournament	Winning score	To par	Margin of victory	Runners-up
1	27 May 2018	Nashville Golf Open	67-71-67-65=270	−18	1 stroke	(United States) Kevin Dougherty, (United States) Lanto Griffin, (United States) Josh Teater

=== Other wins (1) ===
No.	Date	Tournament	Winning score	To par	Margin of victory	Runner-up
1	22 Dec 2022	Sandbelt Invitational	65-66-69-67=267	−16	2 strokes	(Australia) David Micheluzzi

== Results in major championships ==
Results not in chronological order before 2019 and in 2020.

Tournament	2018	2019	2020	2021	2022	2023	2024	2025
Masters Tournament					46		T12	CUT
PGA Championship				T59	T48	T4	CUT	T19
U.S. Open						CUT	CUT	T64
The Open Championship	T39		NT					

Top 10
Did not play

CUT = missed the half-way cut
"T" indicates a tie for a place
NT = no tournament due to COVID-19 pandemic

=== Summary ===
Tournament	Wins	2nd	3rd	Top-5	Top-10	Top-25	Events	Cuts made
Masters Tournament	0	0	0	0	0	1	3	2
PGA Championship	0	0	0	1	1	2	5	4
U.S. Open	0	0	0	0	0	0	3	1
The Open Championship	0	0	0	0	0	0	1	1
Totals	0	0	0	1	1	3	12	8

- Most consecutive cuts made – 5 (2018 Open Championship – 2023 PGA Championship)
- Longest streak of top-10s – 1

== Results in The Players Championship ==
Tournament	2021	2022	2023	2024	2025	2026
The Players Championship	CUT	CUT	T6	CUT	CUT	CUT

Top 10

CUT = missed the halfway cut
"T" indicates a tie for a place

== Results in World Golf Championships ==
Tournament	2021	2022	2023
Championship			
Match Play			T17
Invitational	60		
Champions	NT^{1}	NT^{1}	

^{1}Cancelled due to COVID-19 pandemic

Did not play

"T" = Tied
NT = No tournament
Note that the Championship and Invitational were discontinued from 2022. The Champions was discontinued from 2023.

== Team appearances ==
Amateur

- Nomura Cup (representing Australia): 2013 (winners)
- Eisenhower Trophy (representing Australia): 2016 (winners, individual leader)
- Australian Men's Interstate Teams Matches (representing New South Wales): 2013, 2014, 2015, 2016 (winners)

Professional

- Presidents Cup (representing the International team): 2022

== See also ==
- 2018 Web.com Tour Finals graduates
- 2019 Korn Ferry Tour Finals graduates
