= Congressional Country Club =

Golf course and country club

Coordinates: 38.996°N 77.177°W

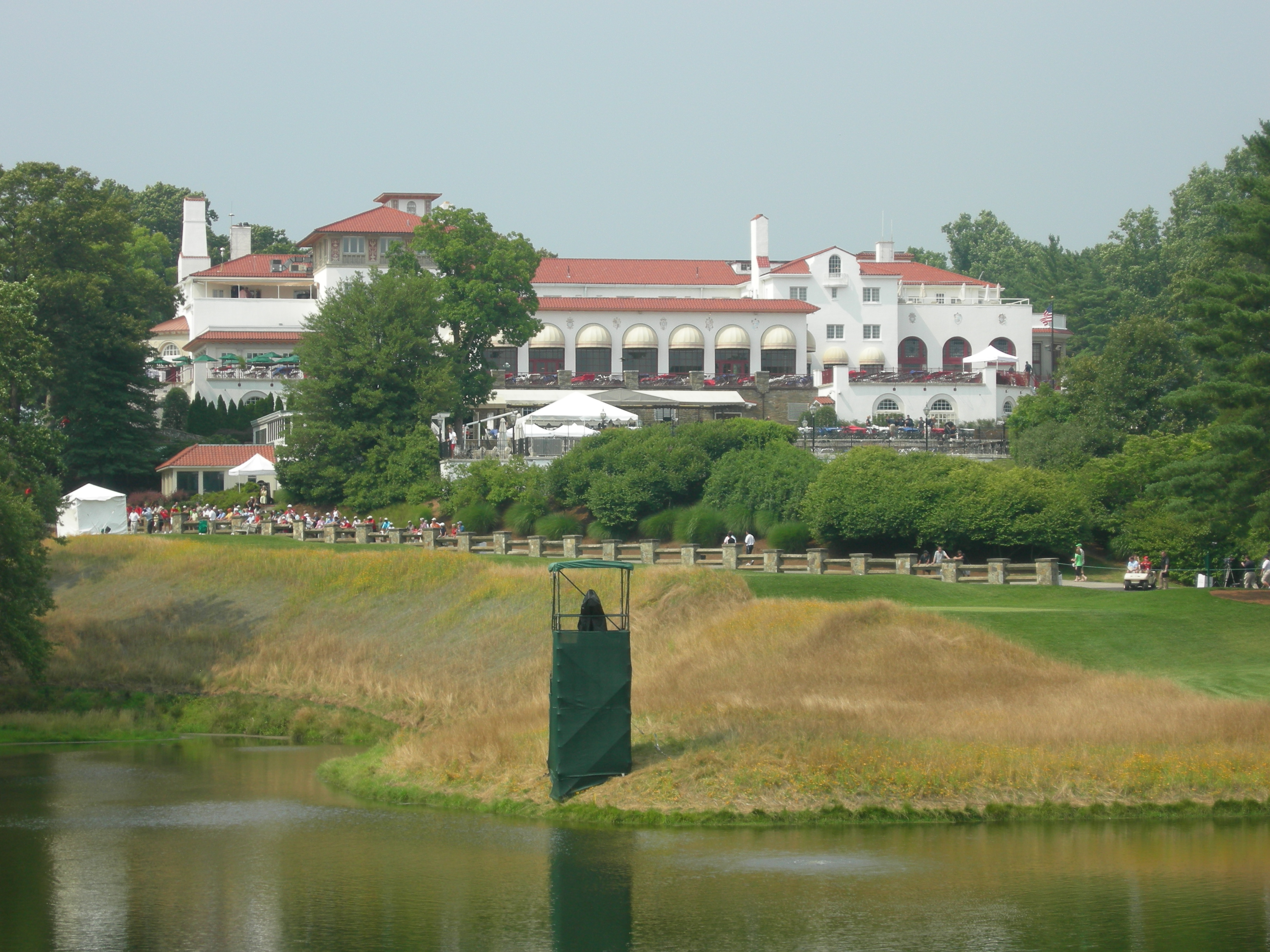
- Clubhouse in 2007, 10th tee in foreground
- Interactive map of Congressional Country Club

Club information
- Location: Bethesda, Maryland, U.S.
- Established: 1924; 102 years ago
- Type: Private
- Total holes: 36
- Tournaments: AT&T National (2007–09, 2012–14); U.S. Open (1964, 1997, 2011); PGA Championship (1976); Booz Allen Classic (2005); Kemper Open (1980–86)
- Website: ccclub.org

Blue Course
- Designed by: Devereux Emmet, Robert Trent Jones
- Par: 72 / 70 (71 for 2011 U.S. Open)
- Length: 7,820 yards (7,150 m)
- Course rating: 78.0
- Slope rating: 140

Gold Course
- Designed by: Devereux Emmet, George Fazio, Tom Fazio
- Par: 71
- Length: 6,844 yards (6,258 m)
- Course rating: 73.6
- Slope rating: 135

Congressional Country Club is a country club and golf course in Bethesda, Maryland, United States. Congressional opened in 1924, and its Blue Course has hosted five major championships, including three U.S. Opens and a PGA Championship. It was a biennial stop on the PGA Tour, with the Quicken Loans National hosted by Tiger Woods until 2020. Previously, Congressional hosted the former Kemper Open until its move to nearby TPC at Avenel in 1987. Congressional hosted its third U.S. Open in 2011. Tournament winners at Congressional have included Rory McIlroy, Ken Venturi, Ernie Els, Justin Rose and Tiger Woods, among many others. Congressional is widely regarded as one of the most prestigious golf clubs in the world.

== History ==
The club was founded in 1921 by two Indiana Republican congressmen, Oscar E. Bland and O.R. Luhring, who felt that existing Washington-area golf clubs did not cater well to members of Congress and other government officials. Then-Commerce Secretary Herbert Hoover was recruited to serve as the club's first president, and Presidents Warren G. Harding, Woodrow Wilson, and William Howard Taft, were given honorary membership. To fund construction, the club offered $1,000 lifetime memberships to a wide group of leaders in business and members, and the club opened on May 23, 1924, in a ceremony attended by President Calvin Coolidge, Mrs. Coolidge, and Chief Justice Taft.

The club's finances in its early years were precarious and badly impacted by the Great Depression. By the late 1930s, it was unable to meet its obligations. In 1940, the club's lien holder foreclosed and held a public auction of its assets. Several members reorganized themselves as Congressional Country Club, Inc. and offered the sole bid of $270,000.

In 1943, during World War II, the Congressional Country Club was requisitioned by America's wartime intelligence service, the Office of Strategic Services (OSS), for use as a training facility and billeting returning OSS agents from active duty overseas. The OSS's rent payments and reimbursement for post-war restoration works—they were said to have "ripped the course to shreds"—enabled the club to pay off its debts and gain a firm financial footing.

Despite its name, by the 2000s, the political component of its membership had dwindled, and politicians were said to shy away from the club due to concerns around ethics and elitism. While the club had once offered a membership discount to members of Congress, this had been discontinued in the 1970s; the club's high initiation fees (then over $100,000) and long waiting list dissuaded most from joining. By 2011, it was said that zero members of Congress numbered amongst its members. A former club president described the membership as largely "doctors and lawyers", in addition to many lobbyists.

== The courses ==
Congressional has two 18-hole golf courses: the world-renowned Blue Course and the Gold Course. The Blue Course was designed by Devereux Emmet and has been renovated over the years by numerous architects, including Donald Ross, Robert Trent Jones, and, before the 2011 U.S. Open, by Rees Jones. In 2019, Andrew Green began a wholesale restoration of the Blue Course to Devereux Emmet's 1924 original design and a remodeling of the club's practice facilities. The course was included in the Links series, and in 2011 is to be available for the Virtual Championship at World Golf Tour.

Both courses are known for their rolling terrain, tree-lined fairways, and challenging greens. Water hazards also come into play on both courses.

=== Blue Course ===
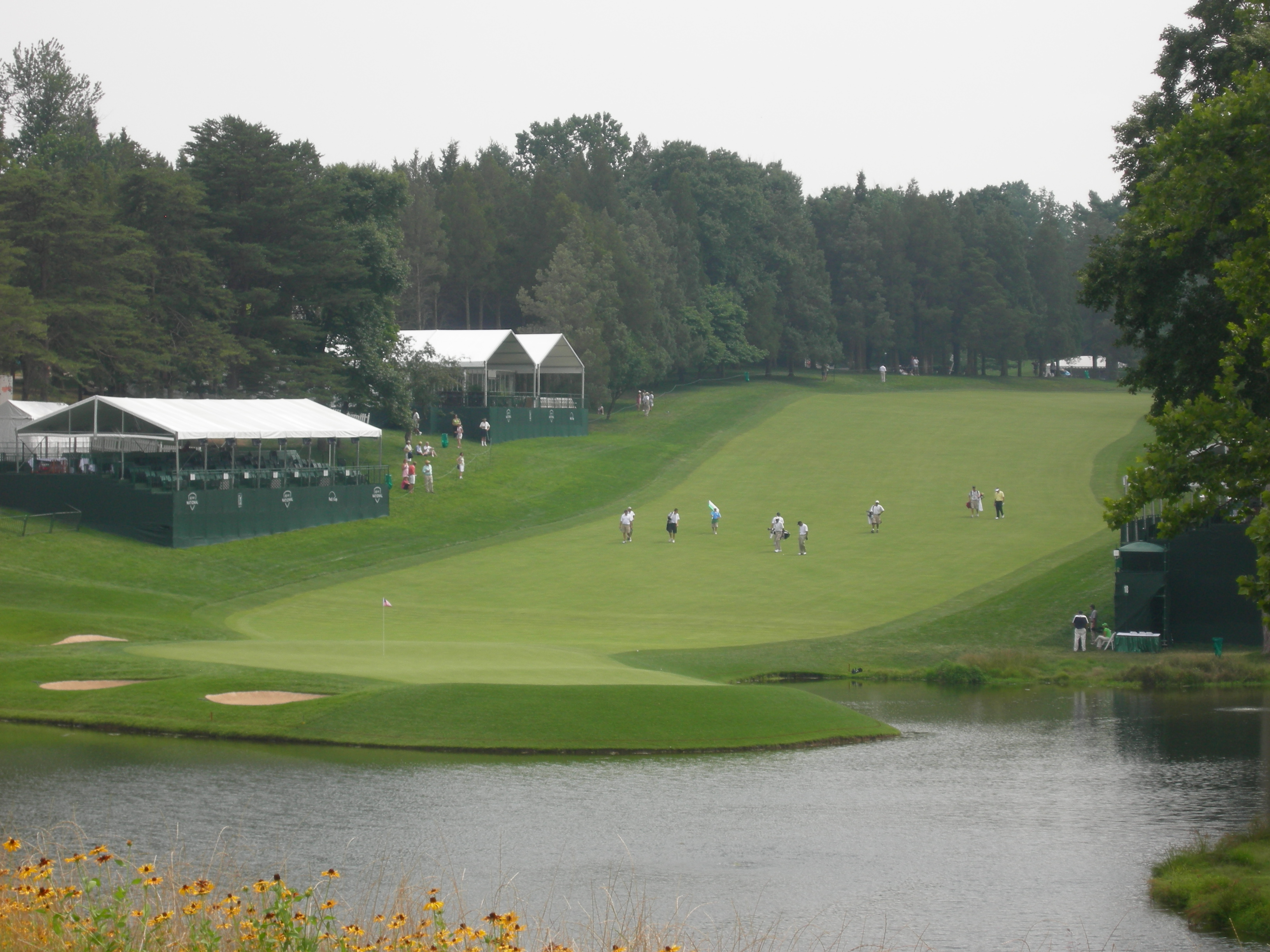
18th hole (formerly the 17th) of the Blue Course

The Blue Course has hosted all of the significant golf tournaments contested at Congressional. The course is often considered among the best 100 courses in the United States; Golf Digest ranked it 89th in its 2006 listing of the 100 Greatest Golf Courses. In 2007, Golf Digest ranked it 86th in America's 100 Greatest Golf Courses. The Blue Course was redesigned by Robert Trent Jones in 1957 and Rees Jones twice, in 1989 and 2006. The course measures 7,574 yards (6,926 m) from the back tees. It is a par 72 (but plays as a par 71 for all PGA tour events, with hole 11 reduced to a par 4) with a course and slope rating of 75.4/142. Bent grass is used for the fairways and for the greens. Until 2009, when it was renovated, Annual Bluegrass (Poa annua) was used for the greens.

==== 18th hole ====
The Blue Course was originally designed to finish on a par-three 18th hole, playing over the lake to a green that finished in a natural amphitheater below the clubhouse. The USGA has long held a dislike towards par-threes for finishing holes, as they are perceived as anticlimactic and (in most cases) do not require the player to hit an accurate tee-shot with a driver, which can sometimes be difficult to execute under the extreme pressure of a major championship.

To avoid such a conflict, the USGA has employed various course configurations over the years to allow tournaments to be played on the Blue Course without finishing on the par-3 18th. For the 1964 U.S. Open (and 1976 PGA Championship), as well as for the Kemper Opens played in the 1980s, two holes from the adjoining Gold Course (5th & 15th hole) were inserted into the routing to allow the par-four 17th hole of the Blue Course (long considered the most demanding hole on the course) to be played as the 18th instead.

During the 1995 U.S. Senior Open, it was decided to use the existing par-three 18th hole for the time being, but it was played out of order as the 10th. However, this proved to be logistically difficult, as there was a rather long walk around the lake to get from the 9th green to the 10th tee, followed by another as the players had to double back to reach the 11th tee after completing the 10th. The USGA broke with tradition for the 1997 U.S. Open, and played the entire Blue Course in its original order and finished with the par-3 18th, which was the first time in history that the tournament had finished on a par-three.

The USGA was unsatisfied with their experiment, as most of the drama surrounding the 1997 Open had been decided at the 17th hole. With the creation of the new tour event in 2007 and the upcoming 2011 U.S. Open, it was decided to solve the problem once and for all. The club voted to reverse the direction of the 18th hole permanently, and Rees Jones was brought in to design a new par-3 that now plays in the opposite direction of the old 18th. The new hole now plays as the 10th, with the rest of the routing shifted so that the original par-four 17th hole now plays as the permanent 18th. A long walk from the new 10th green to the 11th tee remains, but not nearly as far as the old configuration.

==== Relationship with PGA of America and 2019 Restoration of Blue Course ====
In 2018, the PGA of America announced that it had selected Congressional to host eight future championships in the next two decades. These championships include the 2022 and 2027 KPMG Women's PGA Championship, 2025 and 2033 KitchenAid Senior PGA Championship, 2029 PGA Professional Championship, 2024 Junior PGA Championship, 2030 PGA Championship and 2037 Ryder Cup.

Before hosting PGA of America championships, Congressional announced that in 2019, Keith Foster would lead a restoration of the Blue Course to Devereux Emmet's 1924 original design. However, in December 2018, the club fired Foster before he could begin work after he pleaded guilty to illegally transporting between $250,000 and $500,000 worth of items made from endangered species, migratory birds and other wildlife. Foster was subsequently sentenced to 30 days in prison and one year of supervised release.

In 2018, Congressional Country Club was cited by the Montgomery County Department of Permitting Services for removing over 20,000 sq. ft. of tree canopy without obtaining a required sediment control permit.

In February 2019, Andrew Green was hired to submit his own plan and complete the restoration of the Blue Course and a remodeling of the club's practice facilities.

==== Scorecard ====
Tee	Rating/Slope	1	2	3	4	5	6	7	8	9	Out	10	11	12	13	14	15	16	17	18	In	Total
Black	78.0 / 140	445	275	465	490	415	565	185	370	660	3,870	170	550	455	200	470	480	610	495	520	3,950	7,820
Blue	75.2 / 137	395	230	440	465	385	535	165	320	615	3,550	150	530	400	195	415	455	585	460	470	3,665	7,215
Gold	M:73.3 / 132 W:80.1 / 154	365	215	410	430	365	525	160	285	580	3,335	135	510	375	175	390	440	550	430	435	3,440	6,775
White	M:70.4 / 127 W:76.9 / 141	340	175	370	405	330	500	135	255	540	3,050	120	455	345	155	365	395	515	395	380	3,125	6,175
Silver	M:65.9 / 121 W:71.3 / 128	310	150	335	365	310	385	115	235	455	2,660	85	425	265	130	295	315	450	315	340	2,620	5,280
Par		4	3	4	4	4	5	3	4	5	36	3	5	4	3	4	4	5	4	4	36	72
SI	Men's	11	15	7	1	9	5	17	13	3		16	10	12	18	4	2	6	8	14
SI	Women's	13	17	5	9	1	7	15	11	3		16	10	12	18	14	6	2	8	4

=== Gold Course ===
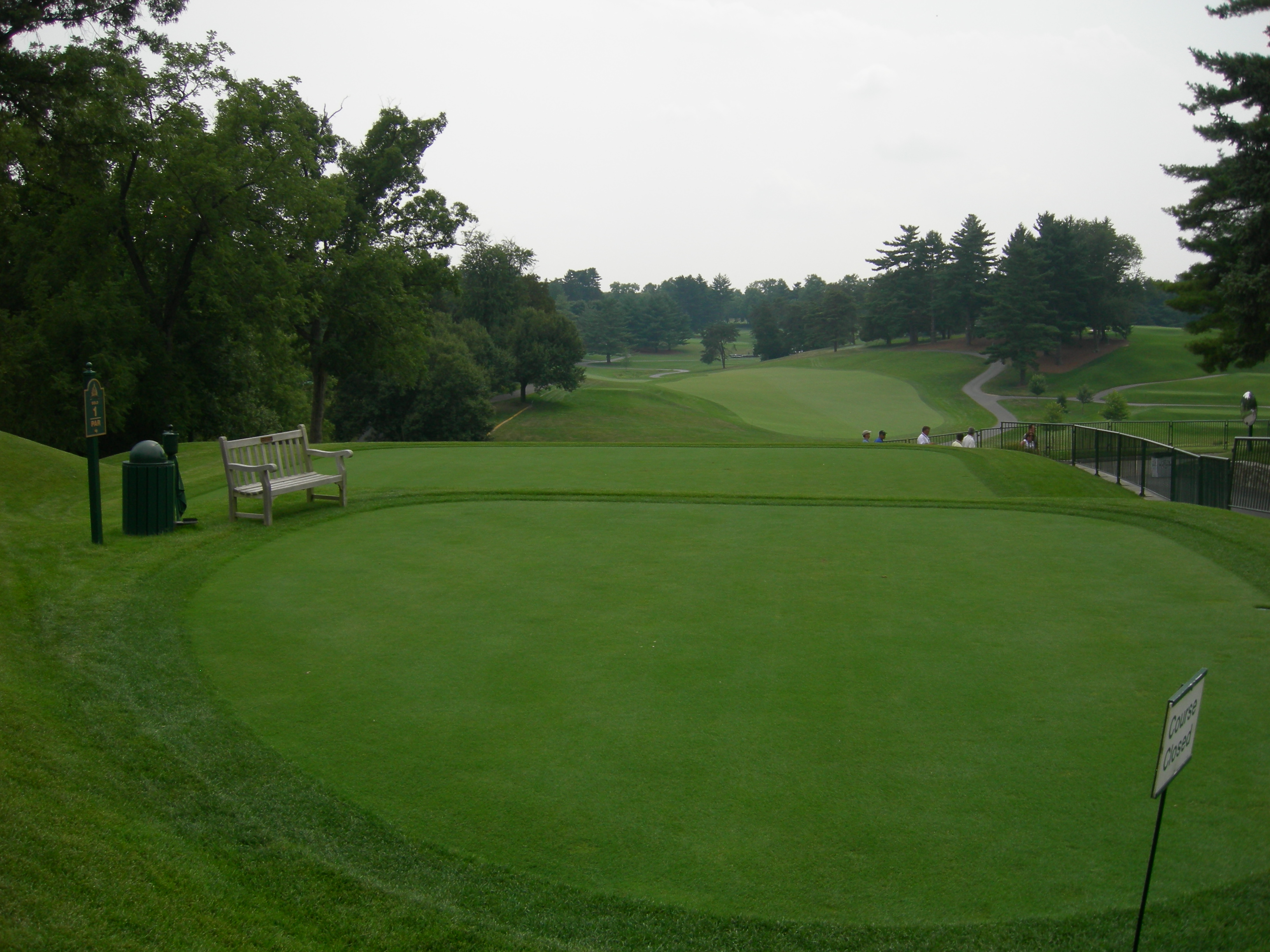
First tee of the Gold Course

The Gold Course has always been shorter than the Blue Course. It has been renovated twice, with George Fazio and Tom Fazio redoing the final nine holes in 1977. In 2000, the course underwent a complete renovation by Arthur Hills. Not only did Hills lengthen the course, but he also reconstructed the tees, fairways, greens, and cart paths. The course is now as challenging as the Blue Course. It ranked 5th Greatest Golf Course in the state of Maryland according to Golf Digest Greatest Golf Courses in 2007. It now measures 6,844 yards (6,258 m) from the back tees. It is a par 71 with a slope rating of 73.6/135. Bent grass is used for the fairways, and Poa annua grass is used for the greens.

==== Scorecard ====
Tee	Rating/Slope	1	2	3	4	5	6	7	8	9	Out	10	11	12	13	14	15	16	17	18	In	Total
Blue	73.6/135	447	406	221	421	212	553	501	461	387	3,609	511	190	434	150	540	413	386	407	204	3,235	6,844
Gold	71.7/132	429	387	195	408	190	525	493	418	361	3,406	493	175	414	142	512	395	375	393	174	3,077	6,483
White	M:69.8/129 W:76.4/142	403	360	177	386	172	503	475	370	333	3,179	481	150	366	127	484	375	364	375	149	2,871	6,050
Red	M:66.8/116 W:71.9/126	398	335	175	374	138	426	401	312	308	2,867	451	101	344	118	420	302	345	353	102	2,536	5,403
Green	69.2/119	377	275	138	330	138	426	401	312	308	2,705	412	101	344	102	401	302	293	305	80	2,340	5,045
SI	Men's	3	9	15	7	17	1	11	5	13		6	14	2	18	4	8	10	12	16
Par	Men's	4	4	3	4	3	5	5	4	4	36	5	3	4	3	5	4	4	4	3	35	71
SI	Women's	5	7	15	1	17	3	11	9	13		6	8	16	18	4	14	2	10	12

== Tournaments held at Congressional ==
=== Major championships ===
Year	Tournament	Winner	Winning score	Winner's share ($)
1964	U.S. Open	(United States) Ken Venturi	278 (−2)	17,000
1976	PGA Championship	(United States) Dave Stockton	281 (+1)	45,000
1995	U.S. Senior Open	(United States) Tom Weiskopf	275 (−13)	175,000
1997	U.S. Open	(South Africa) Ernie Els	276 (−4)	465,000
2011	U.S. Open	(Northern Ireland) Rory McIlroy	268 (−16)	1,440,000
2022	Women's PGA Championship	(South Korea) Chun In-gee	283 (−5)	1,350,000
2025	Senior PGA Championship	(Argentina) Ángel Cabrera	280 (−8)	545,000
2027	Women's PGA Championship			
2030	PGA Championship			

All held on Blue Course

The first major championship at Congressional was the U.S. Open in 1964, won by Ken Venturi in oppressive heat with a score of two under par in the last Open to finish with two rounds on Saturday. A dozen years later, the PGA Championship was held at Congressional in 1976. With the course playing as a par 70, 1970 champion Dave Stockton sank a par-saving putt on the 72nd hole to win his second PGA Championship by one stroke at 281 (+1). The second U.S. Open at Congressional was played in 1997. Ernie Els, the 1994 champion, won his second U.S. Open with a score of four under par. The Blue Course hosted again in 2011, and 22-year-old Rory McIlroy of Northern Ireland won his first major at 16 under par, a U.S. Open record, with a victory margin of eight shots.

Congressional has hosted two senior majors, the U.S. Senior Open in 1995, won by Tom Weiskopf, four strokes ahead of runner-up Jack Nicklaus and the 2025 Senior PGA Championship, won by Ángel Cabrera. It hosted its first women's major in 2022 with the Women's PGA Championship, won by Chun In-gee.

=== Other tournaments ===
Year	Tournament	Winner	Winning score
1980	Kemper Open	(United States) John Mahaffey	275 (−5)
1981	Kemper Open	(United States) Craig Stadler	270 (−10)
1982	Kemper Open	(United States) Craig Stadler (2)	275 (−13)
1983	Kemper Open	(United States) Fred Couples	287 (−1)
1984	Kemper Open	(Australia) Greg Norman	280 (−8)
1985	Kemper Open	(United States) Bill Glasson	278 (−10)
1986	Kemper Open	(Australia) Greg Norman (2)	277 (−11)
2005	Booz Allen Classic	(Spain) Sergio García	270 (−14)
2007	AT&T National	(South Korea) K. J. Choi	271 (−9)
2008	AT&T National	(United States) Anthony Kim	268 (−12)
2009	AT&T National	(United States) Tiger Woods	267 (−13)
2012	AT&T National	(United States) Tiger Woods (2)	276 (−8)
2013	AT&T National	(United States) Bill Haas	272 (−12)
2014	Quicken Loans National	(England) Justin Rose	280 (−4)
2016	Quicken Loans National	(United States) Billy Hurley III	267 (−17)
2037	Ryder Cup	(United States) USA vs Europe	

The Kemper Open, later called the Booz Allen Classic, was played at Congressional eight times. Notable winners include Craig Stadler, John Mahaffey, Fred Couples, Greg Norman, and Sergio García. The 2007 AT&T National, sponsored and hosted by Tiger Woods, was played at Congressional July 5–8 and was won by K. J. Choi of South Korea. The 2008 AT&T was played July 3–6 and won by Anthony Kim. Tiger Woods was unable to play due to surgery on his knee. The 2009 AT&T National was played July 2–5 and won by the host, Tiger Woods. The 2012 AT&T National was much harder than the U.S. Open, with only 10 players finishing under par. The tournament was won once again by Tiger Woods at 8 under par. Starting in 2014, Congressional will host the renamed Quicken Loans National on even years, alternating with other venues in the D.C. area.

The course has hosted two USGA amateur golf tournaments: the U.S. Junior Amateur of 1949, won by Gay Brewer, and the U.S. Women's Amateur of 1959, won by Barbara McIntire. The 2009 U.S. Amateur had originally been scheduled to be played at Congressional, but the event was relocated to allow the club to make further changes to the course before the 2011 U.S. Open. This scheduling change allowed for the AT&T National to be held in 2009 at Congressional.

== Notable members ==
Founding life members included Presidents William H. Taft, Woodrow Wilson, Warren G. Harding, Calvin Coolidge, and Herbert Hoover, who served as the first president of the club. Other notable members of Congressional Country Club have included:

- Vincent Astor
- Andrew Carnegie
- Charlie Chaplin
- Walter Chrysler
- Dwight D. Eisenhower
- Harvey S. Firestone
- Gerald Ford
- John Glenn
- William Randolph Hearst
- Vince Lombardi
- James Cash Penney
- John D. Rockefeller
- Myron Charles Taylor
- Fred Thompson
- Ken Venturi

== Amenities ==
Congressional's expansive clubhouse is the largest in the United States. It was designed in 1924 by architect Philip M. Jullien (1875-1963). Congressional Country Club has an indoor duckpin bowling alley, tennis club, grand ballroom, one indoor pool, a lap pool with diving boards, a kids pool and main pool, fitness center, and grand foyer. Food and Beverage outlets consist of The House Grill, The Chop House, The Founders Pub, The Pavilion, The Main Dining Room, The Stonebar, The Stop and Go, Midway House, and Beverage Carts. It also has 21 overnight guest accommodations and a paddle tennis area. It has hosted several famous weddings. It also has a spa, massage services, an indoor Jacuzzi, and men's and women's locker rooms.
