= TPC Potomac at Avenel Farm =

Private golf club in Potomac, Maryland, United States

- Location within the United States Location within Maryland
- 38.989°N 77.202°W

Club information
- Location: Potomac, Maryland, U.S.
- Elevation: 270 feet (80 m)
- Established: 1986, 40 years ago
- Operator: PGA Tour TPC Network
- Total holes: 18
- Tournaments: Booz Allen Classic (formerly Kemper Open, 1987–2006), Quicken Loans National (2017–2018); Wells Fargo Championship (2022)
- Greens: Penn A1 / A4 Bentgrass
- Fairways: Independence Bentgrass
- Website: tpc.com/potomac
- Designed by: Ed Ault, Tom Clark, & Ed Sneed (1986); Stephen Wenzloff & Jim Hardy (2007)
- Par: 70
- Length: 7,107 yards (6,499 m)
- Course rating: 75.5
- Slope rating: 146
- Course record: 62 - Kevin Streelman (2018), Abraham Ancer (2018), Francesco Molinari (2018)

TPC Potomac at Avenel Farm (formerly TPC Avenel) is a private golf club in the eastern United States, located in Potomac, Maryland, a suburb northwest of Washington, D.C. It was formerly a regular stop on the PGA Tour as host of the Booz Allen Classic (originally Kemper Open). After a major renovation to both clubhouse and course, the clubhouse reopened in late 2008 while the course reopened on April 28, 2009.

== Renovation ==
Opened forty years ago in 1986, the original TPC Avenel course was roundly criticized for poor design in its early years. It was also plagued by years of flooding and drainage problems and by various turfgrass issues which affected the greens and often produced less than satisfactory tournament conditions. As a result, many top players on the PGA Tour stayed away, and the Kemper/Booz Allen tournament became unofficially relegated to "B" event status.

In the summer of 2005, Dewberry and Davis land surveying crews were regularly seen taking measurements across the facility, sparking rumors that the long criticized course would finally be reconfigured. Confirmation came in 2007, when a $32 million golf course and clubhouse renovation commenced in an effort to bring back a tournament to the Washington D.C. area. The renovation covered the entire course, which has been reshaped into a new 7,139-yard (6,528 m) course at par 70 with Rock Run Creek being expanded and cleaned up.

The controversial sixth hole (perceived as a weak copy of the 13th at Augusta National) was changed to a straightaway long par-four with the green now short and left of the creek. The par-3 ninth (famously maligned by Greg Norman, who suggested the original be "blown up with dynamite") was rebuilt with a new green up on a hill near the old practice green. The old 10th and 11th holes have been combined into the new tenth, a long par-five playing around the restored creek feature. The old 12th is now the 11th, with the old par-five 13th (another popular target of player angst) eliminated and replaced by a new, uphill par-three 12th and a short, par-four 13th.

In addition to the golf course, the project also included a new practice facility and short game area, and clubhouse renovations.

In November 2015, the 7th and 16th greens were renovated to flatten contours and provide additional hole locations in anticipation of hosting the Quicken Loans National in 2017. Additionally, small improvements were made to a number of holes, including creating bent grass chipping and collection areas around the 3rd, 4th, and 18th greens, widening the 5th and 6th fairways, and flattening the front portion of the 13th green to create additional hole locations. Finally, the on-deck putting green was quadrupled in size from 1,500 square feet (140 m^{2}) to over 6,000 sq ft (560 m^{2}).

The course was scheduled to host the PGA Tour's Wells Fargo Championship in 2021, as its regular site, Quail Hollow Club in Charlotte, North Carolina, was to host the Presidents Cup. Following scheduling changes due to the coronavirus pandemic, this was delayed a year to 2022.

== Scorecard ==
=== Redesigned layout ===
TPC Potomac at Avenel Farm
Tee	Rating/Slope	1	2	3	4	5	6	7	8	9	Out	10	11	12	13	14	15	16	17	18	In	Total
Gold	75.5 / 146	440	619	225	440	365	484	452	467	201	3,693	560	470	168	360	299	490	412	190	465	3,446	7,107
Black	73.5 / 142	415	570	210	440	365	449	420	435	175	3,479	532	420	161	360	278	440	390	190	426	3,197	6,676
Yellow	M:70.6 / 135 W:76.7 / 153	400	495	185	379	312	422	395	415	155	3,158	510	378	144	302	256	418	327	170	401	2,906	6,064
White	M:69.3 / 128 W:75.0 / 148	392	478	160	352	299	379	383	390	136	2,969	482	365	144	279	239	397	319	152	380	2,757	5,726
Red	M:65.2 / 122 W:70.2 / 133	301	455	135	335	275	283	266	275	120	2,445	438	339	130	258	225	353	305	115	340	2,503	4,948
Par		4	5	3	4	4	4	4	4	3	35	5	4	3	4	4	4	4	3	4	35	70
SI	Men's	3	11	13	7	17	1	5	9	15		8	2	14	16	18	4	10	12	6
SI	Women's	6	2	16	4	10	8	12	14	18		3	1	11	13	15	9	5	17	7

=== Original layout ===
TPC Avenel (2006)
Tee	Rating/Slope	1	2	3	4	5	6	7	8	9	Out	10	11	12	13	14	15	16	17	18	In	Total
TPC	74.0 / 133	393	622	239	435	359	520	461	453	166	3648	374	147 / 165	472	524	301	467	415	195	444	3339 / 3357	6987 / 7005
Back	72.0 / 129	376	584	185	408	340	447	422	409	150	3321	349	136 / 156	413	503	275	458	401	181	425	3141 / 3161	6462 / 6482
Middle	70.0 / 123	362	553	162	342	328	410	396	394	136	3083	314	125 / 140	403	481	239	418	391	156	400	2927 / 2942	6010 / 6025
Forward	68.1 / 115	310	437	127	294	234	338	279	281	118	2418	280	100 / 125	363	370	208	351	292	118	318	2400 / 2425	4818 / 4843
SI	Men's	10	4	16	6	14	12	2	8	18		11	17	1	7	15	3	9	13	5
Par		4	5	3	4	4	5	4	4	3	36	4	3	4	5	4	4	4	3	4	35	71
SI	Women's	6	2	16	8	14	4	12	10	18		11	17	1	9	13	3	5	15	7

== Tour events ==
- Kemper Open from 1987 to 1999
  - Kemper Insurance Open from 2000 to 2002
  - FBR Capital Open in 2003
  - Booz Allen Classic in 2004 and 2006 (moved to neighboring Congressional in 2005)
- Constellation Energy Senior Players Championship in 2010
- Neediest Kids Championship presented by Under Armour in 2012 and the Mid-Atlantic Championship in 2013
- Quicken Loans National in 2017 and 2018
- Wells Fargo Championship in May 2022

In 2006, the tournament ended on Tuesday due to persistent storms in the D.C. area. It was the first time a Tour event had been played on a Tuesday since 1968. The conclusion of the final Booz Allen Classic was not televised.

In 2007, Tiger Woods announced his new tournament, the AT&T National, was to be played at neighboring Congressional Country Club. When it was preparing to host its third U.S. Open in 2011, there was speculation that TPC Potomac could serve as a replacement venue for 2010 and 2011. However, the tournament was held in Aronimink Golf Club instead, as the club "sees how the reconfigured course played and how members responded to it before considering hosting major tournaments."

In 2010, the Constellation Energy Senior Players Championship was moved from Baltimore Country Club in Timonium to the TPC Potomac at Avenel Farm. The renovated TPC Potomac received many positive reviews from the players during the tournament.

TPC Potomac hosted Web.com Tour events in successive years; the Neediest Kids Championship in 2012 and Mid-Atlantic Championship in 2013.

In 2014, the PGA Tour announced that TPC Potomac would host the Quicken Loans National in 2017. The tournament marked the first time the PGA Tour had held an event at TPC Potomac since 2006.

On April 30, 2019, the PGA Tour announced that TPC Potomac would host the 2021 Wells Fargo Championship due to Quail Hollow Club hosting the Presidents Cup. With the postponement of the Ryder Cup from 2020 to 2021 and subsequent rescheduling of the Presidents Cup to 2022, TPC Potomac instead hosted the Wells Fargo in 2022.

Year	Tour	Winner	Winning score	To par	Margin of victory	Runner(s)-up	Winner's share ($)
Wells Fargo Championship
2022	PGA Tour	(United States) Max Homa	272	−8	2 strokes	(England) Matt Fitzpatrick	1,620,000
Quicken Loans National
2018	PGA Tour	(Italy) Francesco Molinari	259	−21	8 strokes	(United States) Ryan Armour	1,278,000
2017	PGA Tour	(United States) Kyle Stanley	273	−7	Playoff	(United States) Charles Howell III	1,278,000
Mid-Atlantic Championship
2013	Web.com	(United States) Michael Putnam	273	−7	2 strokes	(United States) Chesson Hadley	108,000
Neediest Kids Championship presented by Under Armour
2012	Web.com	(Sweden) David Lingmerth	272	−8	1 stroke	(United States) Casey Wittenberg	108,000
Constellation Energy Senior Players Championship
2010	Champions	(United States) Mark O'Meara	273	−7	Playoff	(United States) Michael Allen	405,000
Booz Allen Classic
2006	PGA Tour	(United States) Ben Curtis	264	−20	5 strokes	(United States) Billy Andrade (Australia) Nick O'Hern (Republic of Ireland) Pádraig Harrington (United States) Steve Stricker	900,000
2004	PGA Tour	(Australia) Adam Scott	263	−21	4 strokes	(United States) Charles Howell III	864,000
FBR Capital Open
2003	PGA Tour	(South Africa) Rory Sabbatini	270	−14	4 strokes	(United States) Joe Durant (United States) Fred Funk (United States) Duffy Waldorf	810,000
Kemper Insurance Open
2002	PGA Tour	(United States) Bob Estes	273	−11	1 stroke	(United States) Rich Beem	648,000
2001	PGA Tour	(United States) Frank Lickliter	268	−16	1 stroke	(United States) J. J. Henry	630,000
2000	PGA Tour	(United States) Tom Scherrer	271	−13	2 strokes	(Australia) Greg Chalmers (Japan) Kazuhiko Hosokawa (United States) Franklin Langham (United States) Justin Leonard (United States) Steve Lowery	540,000
Kemper Open
1999	PGA Tour	(United States) Rich Beem	274	−10	1 stroke	(United States) Bill Glasson (Australia) Bradley Hughes	450,000
1998	PGA Tour	(Australia) Stuart Appleby	274	−10	1 stroke	(United States) Scott Hoch	360,000
1997	PGA Tour	(United States) Justin Leonard	274	−10	1 stroke	(United States) Mark Wiebe	270,000
1996	PGA Tour	(United States) Steve Stricker	270	−14	3 strokes	(United States) Brad Faxon (United States) Scott Hoch (United States) Mark O'Meara (New Zealand) Grant Waite	270,000
1995	PGA Tour	(United States) Lee Janzen	272	−12	Playoff	(United States) Corey Pavin	252,000
1994	PGA Tour	(United States) Mark Brooks	271	−13	3 strokes	(United States) Bobby Wadkins (United States) D. A. Weibring	234,000
1993	PGA Tour	(New Zealand) Grant Waite	275	−9	1 stroke	(United States) Tom Kite	234,000
1992	PGA Tour	(United States) Bill Glasson	276	−8	1 stroke	(United States) John Daly (United States) Ken Green (United States) Mike Springer (United States) Howard Twitty	198,000
1991	PGA Tour	(United States) Billy Andrade	263	−21	Playoff	(United States) Jeff Sluman	180,000
1990	PGA Tour	(United States) Gil Morgan	274	−10	1 stroke	(Australia) Ian Baker-Finch	180,000
1989	PGA Tour	(United States) Tom Byrum	268	−16	5 strokes	(United States) Tommy Armour III (United States) Billy Ray Brown (United States) Jim Thorpe	162,000
1988	PGA Tour	(United States) Morris Hatalsky	274	−10	Playoff	(United States) Tom Kite	144,000
1987	PGA Tour	(United States) Tom Kite	270	−14	7 strokes	(United States) Chris Perry (United States) Howard Twitty	126,000

Note: Green highlight indicates scoring records.

== See also ==
- Tournament Players Club
