= Truist Championship =

Professional golf tournament

Coordinates: 38.989°N 77.202°W

Tournament information
- Location: Charlotte, North Carolina, U.S.
- Established: 2003; 23 years ago
- Course: Quail Hollow Club
- Par: 71
- Length: 7,538 yards (6,893 m)
- Organized by: Champions for Education
- Tour: PGA Tour
- Format: Stroke play
- Prize fund: US$20,000,000
- Month played: May
- Website: truistchampionship.com

Tournament record score
- Aggregate: 264 Sepp Straka (2025)
- To par: −21 Rory McIlroy (2015)

Current champion
- (Norway) Kristoffer Reitan

Final champion
- Location in the United States Location in North Carolina

The Truist Championship is a professional golf tournament in North Carolina on the PGA Tour. Held in early May, usually at the Quail Hollow Club in Charlotte, it has attracted some of the top players on the tour. It debuted in 2003 as the Wachovia Championship, was known in 2009 and 2010 as the Quail Hollow Championship, from 2011 to 2024 as the Wells Fargo Championship and became the Truist Championship in 2025.

From 2004–06 and 2011–13, the tournament ended in a playoff. Additionally, the event has one of the tougher finishes on tour with 16, 17, and 18, commonly known as the "Green Mile," often ranked among the PGA Tour's toughest holes. Organized by Champions for Education, Inc., the majority of the charitable proceeds from the tournament benefit Teach for America.

Decades earlier, Quail Hollow hosted the PGA Tour's Kemper Open eleven times, from 1969 through 1979.

== Sponsorship ==
Wachovia, a financial services company, was the title sponsor from the tournament's inception until the company was acquired by Wells Fargo, which chose to remove the Wachovia branding for the 2009 event. After two editions as the Quail Hollow Championship, Wells Fargo attached its name to the event in 2011.

On December 8, 2023, Wells Fargo announced it would not sponsor the tournament after 2024. On August 6, 2024, Truist, a Charlotte-based bank, was announced as the new title sponsor.

== Tournament hosts ==
Years	No.	Venue	City
2003–Present (except below)	19	Quail Hollow Club	Charlotte, North Carolina
2025	1	Philadelphia Cricket Club (Wissahickon Course)	Philadelphia, Pennsylvania
2022	1	TPC Potomac at Avenel Farm	Potomac, Maryland
2017	1	Eagle Point Golf Club	Wilmington, North Carolina

In 2017, the tournament was held on the coast in Wilmington at Eagle Point Golf Club, because Quail Hollow hosted the PGA Championship in mid-August. Wilmington hosted the Azalea Open on tour in the 1950s and 1960s at the Donald Ross-designed Cape Fear Country Club; it was a tune-up event for The Masters through 1965, part of the city's Azalea Festival.

In 2022, it was held near Washington, D.C. at TPC Potomac at Avenel Farm in Potomac, Maryland while Quail Hollow prepared to host the Presidents Cup in late September.

In 2025, the tournament moved further north to Philadelphia Cricket Club (Wissahickon Course}, due to the PGA Championship at Quail Hollow one week later.

== Winners ==
Year	Winner	Score	To par	Margin of victory	Runner(s)-up	Purse ($)	Winner's share ($)
Truist Championship
2026	(Norway) Kristoffer Reitan	269	−15	2 strokes	(United States) Rickie Fowler (Denmark) Nicolai Højgaard	20,000,000	3,600,000
2025	(Austria) Sepp Straka	264	−16	2 strokes	(Republic of Ireland) Shane Lowry (United States) Justin Thomas	20,000,000	3,600,000
Wells Fargo Championship
2024	(Northern Ireland) Rory McIlroy (4)	267	−17	5 strokes	(United States) Xander Schauffele	20,000,000	3,600,000
2023	(United States) Wyndham Clark	265	−19	4 strokes	(United States) Xander Schauffele	20,000,000	3,600,000
2022	(United States) Max Homa (2)	272	−8	2 strokes	(United States) Keegan Bradley (England) Matt Fitzpatrick (United States) Cameron Young	9,000,000	1,620,000
2021	(Northern Ireland) Rory McIlroy (3)	274	−10	1 stroke	(Mexico) Abraham Ancer	8,100,000	1,458,000
2020	Canceled due to the COVID-19 pandemic						
2019	(United States) Max Homa	269	−15	3 strokes	(United States) Joel Dahmen	7,900,000	1,422,000
2018	(Australia) Jason Day	272	−12	2 strokes	(United States) Nick Watney (United States) Aaron Wise	7,700,000	1,386,000
2017	(United States) Brian Harman	278	−10	1 stroke	(United States) Dustin Johnson (United States) Pat Perez	7,500,000	1,350,000
2016	(United States) James Hahn	279	−9	Playoff	(United States) Roberto Castro	7,300,000	1,314,000
2015	(Northern Ireland) Rory McIlroy (2)	267	−21	7 strokes	(United States) Patrick Rodgers (United States) Webb Simpson	7,100,000	1,278,000
2014	(United States) J. B. Holmes	274	−14	1 stroke	(United States) Jim Furyk	6,900,000	1,242,000
2013	(United States) Derek Ernst	280	−8	Playoff	(England) David Lynn	6,700,000	1,206,000
2012	(United States) Rickie Fowler	274	−14	Playoff	(Northern Ireland) Rory McIlroy (United States) D. A. Points	6,500,000	1,170,000
2011	(United States) Lucas Glover	273	−15	Playoff	(United States) Jonathan Byrd	6,500,000	1,170,000
Quail Hollow Championship
2010	(Northern Ireland) Rory McIlroy	273	−15	4 strokes	(United States) Phil Mickelson	6,500,000	1,170,000
2009	(United States) Sean O'Hair	277	−11	1 stroke	(United States) Lucas Glover (United States) Bubba Watson	6,500,000	1,170,000
Wachovia Championship
2008	(United States) Anthony Kim	272	−16	5 strokes	(United States) Ben Curtis	6,400,000	1,152,000
2007	(United States) Tiger Woods	275	−13	2 strokes	(United States) Steve Stricker	6,300,000	1,134,000
2006	(United States) Jim Furyk	276	−12	Playoff	(South Africa) Trevor Immelman	6,300,000	1,134,000
2005	(Fiji) Vijay Singh	276	−12	Playoff	(United States) Jim Furyk (Spain) Sergio García	6,000,000	1,080,000
2004	(United States) Joey Sindelar	277	−11	Playoff	(United States) Arron Oberholser	5,600,000	1,008,000
2003	(United States) David Toms	278	−10	2 strokes	(United States) Robert Gamez	5,600,000	1,008,000

Note: Green highlight indicates scoring records.

=== Multiple winners ===
4 wins

- Rory McIlroy: 2010, 2015, 2021, 2024

2 wins

- Max Homa: 2019, 2022
