= The National (golf) =

Golf tournament held in the United States

Coordinates: 38.989°N 77.202°W

Quicken Loans National
Tournament information
- Location: Washington, D.C.
- Established: 2007
- Course: TPC Potomac at Avenel Farm
- Par: 70
- Length: 7,107 yards (6,499 m)
- Tour: PGA Tour
- Format: Stroke play
- Prize fund: US$7,100,000
- Month played: June/July
- Final year: 2018

Tournament record score
- Aggregate: 259 Francesco Molinari (2018)
- To par: −21 as above

Final champion
- (Italy) Francesco Molinari
- Location in the United States Location in Maryland

The National, originally titled for sponsorship reasons as the AT&T National and later as the Quicken Loans National, was a professional golf tournament on the PGA Tour from 2007 to 2018. It was hosted by Tiger Woods and benefited the Tiger Woods Foundation. It was usually held either in late June or during the Fourth of July weekend in the Washington, D.C. area, except for 2010 and 2011 when it was held near Philadelphia.

The National was a 72-hole stroke play tournament. It was one of a few events given "invitational" status by the PGA Tour and consequently had a field of only 120 players, as opposed to 156 players at most full-field tournaments.

The first edition of The National in 2007 was held July 5–8 on the Blue Course at the Congressional Country Club in Bethesda, Maryland, northwest of Washington. The event returned to Congressional in 2008 and 2009 when it was held midway between the U.S. Open and The Open Championship to ensure a strong field of competitors. The National was part of the Open Qualifying Series that gave non-exempt players a chance to compete in The Open.

== History ==
The event was officially announced on March 7, 2007, to replace The International, which tour officials had abruptly cancelled four weeks earlier on February 8. The National was a standard 72-hole stroke play event, and did not use the modified Stableford scoring system used by The International in Colorado.

The D.C. area had hosted a regular tour event for over a quarter century; the Kemper Open arrived in 1980, but was terminated after the 2006 event. It was played at Congressional from 1980 to 1986, then moved to the nearby TPC at Avenel in 1987. Later renamed the Booz Allen Classic, it returned to Congressional in 2005, to give Avenel time to undergo renovations, which did not occur.

Congressional originally agreed to host the event for the first two years, and after opting out of hosting the 2009 U.S. Amateur, agreed to host the event in 2009 as well. The Aronimink Golf Club in Newtown Square, Pennsylvania, hosted the 2010 and 2011 events, due to Congressional being reconfigured for the 2011 U.S. Open. The tournament was played at Congressional from 2012 to 2014 and returned in 2016. It was played in Virginia at Robert Trent Jones Golf Club in Gainesville in July and August 2015 and was played at TPC Potomac at Avenel Farm in Potomac in 2017.

Other courses that were originally considered for the new tournament were in the Kansas City, Minneapolis-Saint Paul, and Portland areas. Possible sites for the 2010 and 2011 events were the TPC at Avenel (now TPC Potomac at Avenel Farm, former site of the Booz Allen Classic) and Robert Trent Jones Golf Club, (four-time host of the Presidents Cup). CBS Sports and Golf Channel currently carry the Quicken Loans National on television.

After the 2017 tournament, the Quicken Loans sponsorship deal ended leaving The National with no sponsor for 2018, scheduled for June 28 to July 1. The PGA Tour also announced that it would be buying out the remaining two years of its contract with Congressional Country Club to host the 2018 and 2020 editions. Despite a lack of title sponsor and host course, PGA Tour commissioner Jay Monahan confirmed that the event would occur in 2018, stating, "We made the commitment. Our players are going to be showing up there and we're going to be playing for that amount of money." On May 30, less than a month before the event, Quicken Loans agreed to sponsor for a fifth consecutive year. On July 10, 2018, it was announced that the Detroit Golf Club would host the Rocket Mortgage Classic in 2019, replacing The National.

== Field ==
The National was one of a few tournaments given "invitational" status by the PGA Tour, and consequently it had a reduced field of only 120 players (as opposed to most full-field open tournaments with a field of 156 players). Other tournaments with invitational status include the Arnold Palmer Invitational, the RBC Heritage, the Fort Worth Invitational, and the Memorial Tournament.

Invitational tournaments have smaller fields (between 100 and 132 players), and have more freedom than full-field open tournaments in determining which players are eligible to participate in their event, as invitational tournaments are not required to fill their fields using the PGA Tour Priority Ranking System. Furthermore, unlike full-field open tournaments, invitational tournaments do not offer open qualifying (a.k.a. Monday qualifying). The Los Angeles Open was converted to an invitational in 2020, inheriting the National's format.

Tiger Woods at the pro-am in 2009

The field consisted of 120 players invited using the following criteria:

1. Quicken Loans National winners from past five years
2. The Players Championship and major championship winners in the last five years
3. The Tour Championship and World Golf Championships winners in the past three years
4. Arnold Palmer Invitational and Memorial Tournament winners in the past three years
5. Tournament winner in past 12 months
6. Prior year U.S. Amateur winner
7. Current PGA Tour members who were playing members on last named U.S. Ryder Cup team, European Ryder Cup team, U.S. Presidents Cup team, and International Presidents Cup team
8. Top 125 from prior year FedEx Cup points list
9. Top 10 from the current FedEx Cup points list (as of Friday prior)
10. 8 sponsors exemptions – 2 from Web.com Tour finals, 2 members not otherwise exempt, and 4 unrestricted
11. Remaining positions filled from current year FedEx Cup point list

== Winners ==
Year	Winner	Score	To par	Margin of victory	Runner-up	Purse ($)	Winner's share ($)	Venue
Quicken Loans National
2018	(Italy) Francesco Molinari	259	−21	8 strokes	(United States) Ryan Armour	7,100,000	1,278,000	TPC Potomac at Avenel Farm
2017	(United States) Kyle Stanley	273	−7	Playoff	(United States) Charles Howell III	7,100,000	1,278,000	TPC Potomac at Avenel Farm
2016	(United States) Billy Hurley III	267	−17	3 strokes	(Fiji) Vijay Singh	6,900,000	1,242,000	Congressional
2015	(United States) Troy Merritt	266	−18	3 strokes	(United States) Rickie Fowler	6,700,000	1,206,000	Robert Trent Jones
2014	(England) Justin Rose (2)	280	−4	Playoff	(United States) Shawn Stefani	6,500,000	1,170,000	Congressional
AT&T National
2013	(United States) Bill Haas	272	−12	3 strokes	(United States) Roberto Castro	6,500,000	1,170,000	Congressional
2012	(United States) Tiger Woods (2)	276	−8	2 strokes	(United States) Bo Van Pelt	6,500,000	1,170,000	Congressional
2011	(United States) Nick Watney	267	−13	2 strokes	(South Korea) K. J. Choi	6,200,000	1,116,000	Aronimink
2010	(England) Justin Rose	270	−10	1 stroke	(United States) Ryan Moore	6,200,000	1,116,000	Aronimink
2009	(United States) Tiger Woods	267	−13	1 stroke	(United States) Hunter Mahan	6,000,000	1,080,000	Congressional
2008	(United States) Anthony Kim	268	−12	2 strokes	(Sweden) Freddie Jacobson	6,000,000	1,080,000	Congressional
2007	(South Korea) K. J. Choi	271	−9	3 strokes	(United States) Steve Stricker	6,000,000	1,080,000	Congressional

Note: Green highlight indicates scoring records.
