= Chris Stroud =

American professional golfer (born 1982)

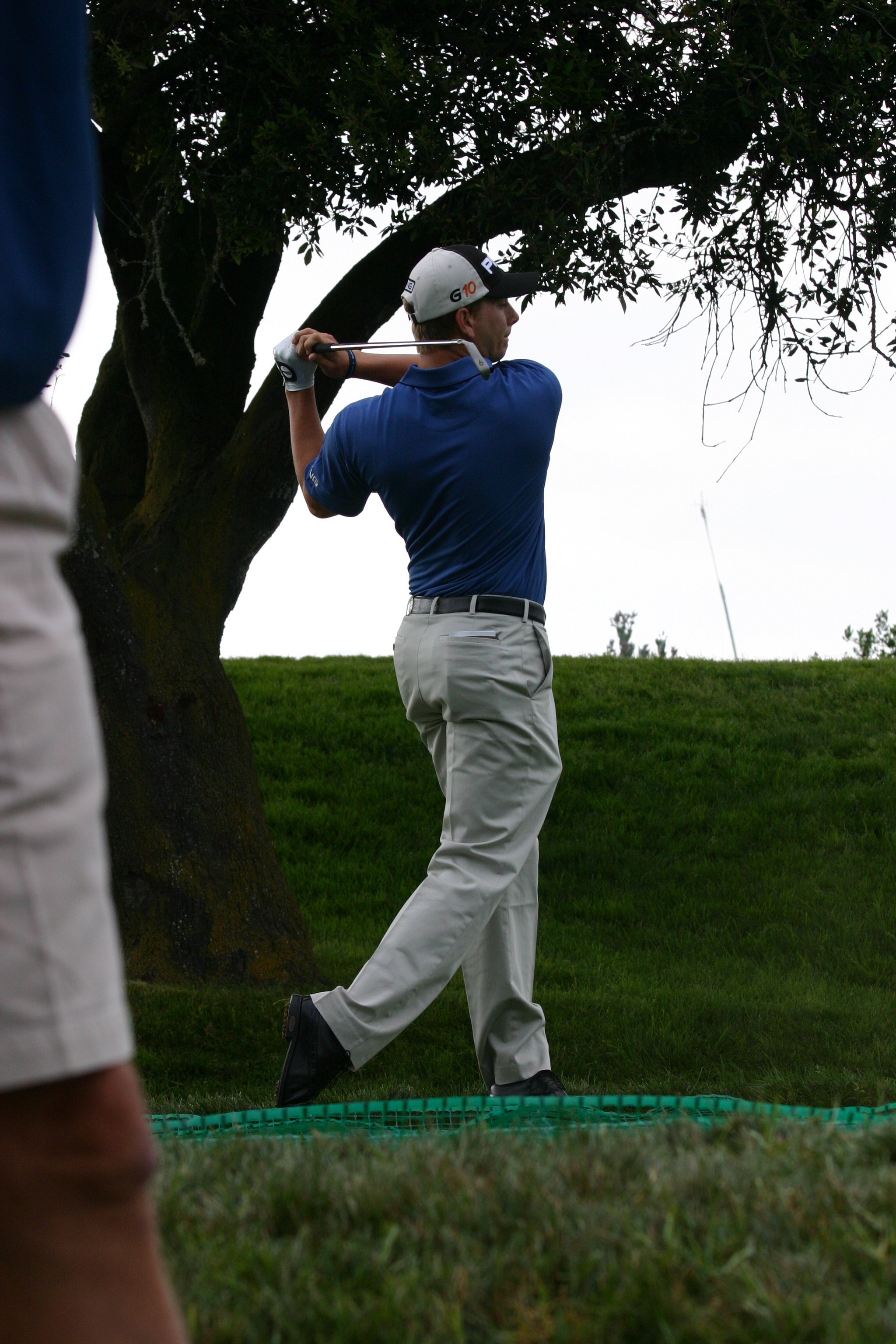
- Stroud at the 2008 U.S. Open

Personal information
- Full name: Christopher James Stroud
- Nationality: United States
- Born: February 3, 1982 (age 44) Groves, Texas, U.S.
- Height: 6 ft 2 in (1.88 m)
- Weight: 180 lb (82 kg; 13 st)

Career
- Sport: Golf
- College: Lamar University
- Turned professional: 2004
- Former tours: PGA Tour; NGA Hooters Tour
- Professional wins: 2
- Highest ranking: 74 (April 6, 2014)

Number of wins by tour
- PGA Tour: 1
- Other: 1

Best results in major championships
- Masters Tournament: DNP
- PGA Championship: T9: 2017
- U.S. Open: T47: 2010
- The Open Championship: CUT: 2014

Christopher James Stroud (born February 3, 1982) is an American professional golfer who currently plays on the PGA Tour. He finally got his first professional win on August 6, 2017 at the Barracuda Championship after 290 starts on the PGA Tour.

== Early life and amateur career ==
Stroud was born in Groves, Texas. He played college golf at Lamar University and was a two-time All-American. As an amateur, he won the 2003 North and South Amateur and played on the 2004 Palmer Cup team.

== Professional career ==
In 2004, Stroud turned pro. He played on mini-tours until earning his PGA Tour card at the 2006 (T16), 2007 (3rd), and 2008 (T4) Qualifying schools. Stroud was not able to finish high enough on the money list to retain his card until 2009 when he finished 113th. His best performance in a PGA Tour event during these early years was a tie for fifth at the 2007 Zurich Classic of New Orleans. In 2013, Stroud lost to Ken Duke in a playoff at the Travelers Championship.

On August 6, 2017, Stroud earned his first PGA Tour victory when he won the Barracuda Championship in a playoff over Greg Owen and Richy Werenski. It was his 290th PGA Tour start and he was playing on conditional status. At the 2017 PGA Championship, Stroud was near the top for the first three rounds before a final round 76 earned him a T9 finish. Prior to his win, Stroud was planning on retiring after the season.

== Amateur wins ==
- 2003 North and South Amateur

== Professional wins (2) ==
=== PGA Tour wins (1) ===
No.	Date	Tournament	Winning score	Margin of victory	Runners-up
1	Aug 6, 2017	Barracuda Championship	44 pts (9-3-12-20=44)	Playoff	(England) Greg Owen, (United States) Richy Werenski

PGA Tour playoff record (1–1)

No.	Year	Tournament	Opponent(s)	Result
1	2013	Travelers Championship	(United States) Ken Duke	Lost to birdie on second extra hole
2	2017	Barracuda Championship	(England) Greg Owen, (United States) Richy Werenski	Won with birdie on second extra hole Owen eliminated by birdie on first hole

=== NGA Hooters Tour wins (1) ===
No.	Date	Tournament	Winning score	Margin of victory	Runner-up
1	Mar 27, 2005	NGA Hooters Tour Auburn Classic	−12 (68-70-66=204)	1 stroke	(United States) Elliot Gealy

== Results in major championships ==
Tournament	2007	2008	2009	2010	2011	2012	2013	2014	2015	2016	2017	2018
Masters Tournament												
U.S. Open	CUT	CUT	CUT	T47								
The Open Championship								CUT				
PGA Championship						CUT	CUT	T64			T9	T65

Top 10
Did not play

CUT = missed the half-way cut
"T" = tied for place

=== Summary ===
Tournament	Wins	2nd	3rd	Top-5	Top-10	Top-25	Events	Cuts made
Masters Tournament	0	0	0	0	0	0	0	0
U.S. Open	0	0	0	0	0	0	4	1
The Open Championship	0	0	0	0	0	0	1	0
PGA Championship	0	0	0	0	1	1	5	3
Totals	0	0	0	0	1	1	10	4

- Most consecutive cuts made – 3 (2014 PGA – 2018 PGA, current)
- Longest streak of top-10s – 1

== Results in The Players Championship ==
Tournament	2010	2011	2012	2013	2014	2015	2016	2017	2018
The Players Championship	T10	T12	CUT	T33	T80	T42	WD		T46

Top 10
Did not play

CUT = missed the halfway cut
WD = withdrew
"T" indicates a tie for a place

== U.S. national team appearances ==
Amateur

- Palmer Cup: 2004

== See also ==
- 2006 PGA Tour Qualifying School graduates
- 2007 PGA Tour Qualifying School graduates
- 2008 PGA Tour Qualifying School graduates
