= 1976 PGA Championship =

Tournament information
- Dates: August 12–16, 1976
- Location: Bethesda, Maryland; 38.996°N 77.176°W
- Courses: Congressional Country Club; Blue Course
- Organized by: PGA of America
- Tour: PGA Tour

Statistics
- Par: 70
- Length: 7,054 yards (6,450 m)
- Field: 138 players, 76 after cut
- Cut: 149 (+9)
- Prize fund: $250,950
- Winner's share: $45,000

Champion
- (United States) Dave Stockton
- 281 (+1)
- Location in the United States Location in Maryland

The 1976 PGA Championship was the 58th PGA Championship, played August 12–16 at Congressional Country Club (Blue Course) in Bethesda, Maryland, a suburb northwest of Washington, D.C. Held six weeks following the United States Bicentennial, it was the second major at Congressional; the U.S. Open was conducted twelve years earlier in 1964.

Dave Stockton, the 1970 champion, sank a 15-foot (5 m) putt to save par on the 72nd hole to win his second PGA Championship, one stroke ahead of runners-up Raymond Floyd and Don January. The final round was delayed to Monday for the first time, due to weather. Stockton's final putt averted the first sudden-death playoff in major championship history, which came a year later at the 1977 PGA Championship.

Defending champion Jack Nicklaus shot a final round 74 (+4) and finished two strokes back, in a tie for fourth. Third round leader Charles Coody shot 77 and fell into a tie for eighth.

== Course layout ==
Hole	1	2	3	4	5	6	7	8	9	Out	10	11	12	13	14	15	16	17	18	In	Total
Yards	403	215	453	420	409	456	166	362	602	3,486	460	395	188	445	439	554	211	411	465	3,568	7,054
Par	4	3	4	4	4	4	3	4	5	35	4	4	3	4	4	5	3	4	4	35	70

== Round summaries ==
=== First round ===
Thursday, August 12, 1976

Place	Player	Score	To par
1	(United States) Tom Weiskopf	65	−5
T2	(United States) Tom Kite	66	−4
T2	(United States) Gil Morgan	66	−4
T4	(United States) Charles Coody	68	−2
T4	(United States) Lee Elder	68	−2
T4	(United States) Jerry McGee	68	−2
T7	(United States) Mark Hayes	69	−1
T7	(United States) Hale Irwin	69	−1
T7	(United States) Mike Morley	69	−1
T7	(United States) Jerry Pate	69	−1
T7	(United States) Bob Zender	69	−1

=== Second round ===
Friday, August 13, 1976

Place	Player	Score	To par
1	(United States) Gil Morgan	66-68=134	−6
2	(United States) Tom Kite	66-72=138	−2
T3	(United States) Don January	70-69=139	−1
T3	(South Africa) Gary Player	70-69=139	−1
T3	(United States) Tom Weiskopf	65-74=139	−1
T6	(United States) Bill Collins	70-70=140	E
T6	(United States) Charles Coody	68-72=140	E
T6	(United States) Ben Crenshaw	71-69=140	E
T6	(United States) Raymond Floyd	72-68=140	E
T6	(United States) Gene Littler	71-69=140	E
T6	(United States) Jerry McGee	68-72=140	E
T6	(United States) Jack Nicklaus	71-69=140	E
T6	(United States) Bob Zender	69-71=140	E

=== Third round ===
Saturday, August 14, 1976
Sunday, August 15, 1976

Place	Player	Score	To par
1	(United States) Charles Coody	68-72-67=207	−3
T2	(United States) Gil Morgan	66-68-75=209	−1
T2	(United States) Jack Nicklaus	71-69-69=209	−1
4	(United States) Don January	70-69-71=210	E
T5	(United States) Raymond Floyd	72-68-71=211	+1
T5	(Australia) David Graham	70-71-70=211	+1
T5	(United States) Tom Kite	66-72-73=211	+1
T5	(South Africa) Gary Player	70-69-72=211	+1
T5	(United States) Dave Stockton	70-72-69=211	+1
T10	(United States) Lee Elder	68-74-70=212	+2
T10	(United States) Jerry McGee	68-72-72=212	+2
T10	(United States) Tom Weiskopf	65-74-73=212	+2

=== Final round ===
Sunday, August 15, 1976 (cancelled)
Monday, August 16, 1976

After the third round was completed on Sunday morning, the fourth round was begun but then scratched due to weather; the partial scores were cancelled with a fresh start on Monday.

Champion
(c) = past champion

Top 10
Place	Player	Score	To par	Money (US$)
1	(United States) Dave Stockton (c)	70-72-69-70=281	+1	45,000
T2	(United States) Raymond Floyd (c)	72-68-71-71=282	+2	20,000
T2	(United States) Don January (c)	70-69-71-72=282	+2	20,000
T4	(Australia) David Graham	70-71-70-72=283	+3	9,750
T4	(United States) Jack Nicklaus (c)	71-69-69-74=283	+3	9,750
T4	(United States) Jerry Pate	69-73-72-69=283	+3	9,750
T4	(United States) John Schlee	72-71-70-70=283	+3	9,750
T8	(United States) Charles Coody	68-72-67-77=284	+4	6,000
T8	(United States) Ben Crenshaw	71-69-74-70=284	+4	6,000
T8	(United States) Jerry McGee	68-72-72-72=284	+4	6,000
T8	(United States) Gil Morgan	66-68-75-75=284	+4	6,000
T8	(United States) Tom Weiskopf	65-74-73-72=284	+4	6,000

Leaderboard below the top 10
Place	Player	Score	To par	Money ($)
T13	(United States) Tom Kite	66-72-73-76=286	+6	4,350
T13	(South Africa) Gary Player (c)	70-69-72-75=286	+6	4,350
T15	(United States) Lee Elder	68-74-70-75=287	+7	3,400
T15	(United States) Mark Hayes	69-72-73-73=287	+7	3,400
T15	(United States) Mike Hill	72-70-73-72=287	+7	3,400
T15	(United States) Mike Morley	69-72-72-74=287	+7	3,400
T15	(United States) Arnold Palmer	71-76-68-72=287	+7	3,400
T15	(United States) J. C. Snead	74-71-70-72=287	+7	3,400
T15	(United States) Tom Watson	70-74-70-73=287	+7	3,400
