= 2022 Presidents Cup =

Golf competition in Charlotte, North Carolina

- Dates: September 22–25
- Venue: Quail Hollow Club
- Location: Charlotte, North Carolina
- Captains: Davis Love III (USA); Trevor Immelman (International)
USA	17 1/2	12 1/2	International
- United States wins the Presidents Cup

Location map
- Location within the United States Location within North Carolina

The 2022 Presidents Cup was the 14th edition of the Presidents Cup golf competition, held at Quail Hollow Club in Charlotte, North Carolina, from September 22–25, 2022. This was Quail Hollow's first time hosting the Presidents Cup. The matches were originally scheduled for fall 2021, but the Presidents Cup, the Ryder Cup, and other team golf events were delayed by a year due to the COVID-19 pandemic. The USA won the competition and retained the cup.

== Course layout ==
Quail Hollow Club

For this Presidents Cup only, the course was rerouted, with a mid-round jump from hole 8 to hole 12, in an attempt to ensure more matches would see the course's famed "Green Mile," holes 16–18, by playing that stretch as holes 12–15 in the round. The alternate routing consequently ended with holes 10, 11 and 9.

Hole	1	2	3	4	5	6	7	8	9	Out	10	11	12	13	14	15	16	17	18	In	Total
Yards	495	452	483	184	449	249	546	346	456	3,660	208	344	577	506	223	494	592	462	488	3,894	7,554
Par	4	4	4	3	4	3	5	4	4	35	3	4	5	4	3	4	5	4	4	36	71

== Team qualification and selection ==
Both teams have 12 players.

Key
Top six on points list
Six captain's picks
Not available, in top 17 of points list
Not picked, in top 20 of points list

=== United States team ===
The United States team features the six players who have earned the most FedEx Cup points from the 2019 A Military Tribute at the Greenbrier through the 2022 BMW Championship. Six captain's picks were made on 7 September 2022.

The final standings were:

Position	Player	Points
1	Scottie Scheffler	13,180
2	Patrick Cantlay	11,068
3	Xander Schauffele	9,340
4	Sam Burns	9,130
5	Justin Thomas	8,718
6	Tony Finau	8,575
7	Will Zalatoris^{[a]}	7,986
8	Jordan Spieth	7,214
9	Collin Morikawa	6,727
10	Max Homa	6,539
11	Billy Horschel	6,047
12	Cameron Young	5,511
13	Tom Hoge	5,295
14	J. T. Poston	4,593
15	Kevin Kisner	4,519

=== International team ===
The International Team qualification period ran from the 2021 Open Championship through the 2022 BMW Championship. The team was to be composed of the top eight players from the Presidents Cup International Team Points List, which is based on the Official World Golf Ranking, and four captain's picks. With Cameron Smith and Joaquín Niemann (numbers 1 and 4 in the final standings) being excluded having joined LIV Golf, their selections were converted to additional captain's picks. Immelman announced his six selections on 6 September 2022.

The final standings were:

Position	Player	Points
1	Cameron Smith^{[b]}	17.90
2	Hideki Matsuyama	7.99
3	Sungjae Im	7.59
4	Joaquín Niemann^{[b]}	6.42
5	Tom Kim	4.99
6	Corey Conners	4.98
7	Adam Scott	4.97
8	Mito Pereira	4.19
9	K.H. Lee	3.91
10	Erik van Rooyen	3.52
11	Sebastián Muñoz	3.36
12	Adam Hadwin	3.32
13	Ryan Fox	3.27
14	Mackenzie Hughes	3.17
15	Anirban Lahiri^{[c]}	3.09
16	Christiaan Bezuidenhout	3.08
17	Marc Leishman^{[c]}	2.99
18	Taylor Pendrith	2.98
19	Lucas Herbert	2.97
20	Kim Si-woo	2.85
25	Cameron Davis	

=== Notes ===
^{a} Zalatoris was unavailable for selection as a captain's pick due to a back injury.
^{b} Smith and Niemann were automatic selections but were banned from competing after joining LIV Golf.
^{c} Lahiri and Leishman were unable to be selected as a captain's pick after joining LIV Golf.

== Teams ==
=== Captains ===
Davis Love III captained the U.S. team, and Trevor Immelman captained the International team.

Love announced that Fred Couples and Zach Johnson will be two of his assistants. Love announced Steve Stricker and Webb Simpson as his final two assistant captains. Immelman announced that K. J. Choi, Geoff Ogilvy, Camilo Villegas, and Mike Weir would be his assistants.

=== Players ===
United States team
Player	Age	Points rank	OWGR	Previous appearances	Matches	W–L–T	Winning percentage
Scottie Scheffler	26	1	1	0	Rookie		
Patrick Cantlay	30	2	3	1	5	3–2–0	60.00
Xander Schauffele	28	3	5	1	5	3–2–0	60.00
Sam Burns	26	4	12	0	Rookie		
Justin Thomas	29	5	7	2	10	6–2–2	70.00
Tony Finau	33	6	14	1	4	0–1–3	37.50
Jordan Spieth	29	8	13	3	14	8–5–1	60.71
Collin Morikawa	25	9	9	0	Rookie		
Max Homa	31	10	16	0	Rookie		
Billy Horschel	35	11	15	0	Rookie		
Cameron Young	25	12	18	0	Rookie		
Kevin Kisner	38	15	25	1	4	2–0–2	75.00

International team
Player	Country	Age	Points rank	OWGR	Previous appearances	Matches	W–L–T	Winning percentage
Hideki Matsuyama	Japan	30	2	16	4	17	6–7–4	47.06
Im Sung-jae	South Korea	24	3	19	1	5	3–1–1	70.00
Tom Kim	South Korea	20	5	20	0	Rookie		
Corey Conners	Canada	30	6	26	0	Rookie		
Adam Scott	Australia	42	7	32	9	44	16–22–6	43.18
Mito Pereira	Chile	27	8	50	0	Rookie		
Lee Kyoung-hoon	South Korea	31	9	43	0	Rookie		
Sebastián Muñoz	Colombia	29	11	63	0	Rookie		
Christiaan Bezuidenhout	South Africa	28	16	67	0	Rookie		
Taylor Pendrith	Canada	31	18	109	0	Rookie		
Kim Si-woo	South Korea	27	20	76	1	3	1–2–0	33.33
Cameron Davis	Australia	27	25	66	0	Rookie		

- Captain's picks shown in yellow
- Ages as of 19 September; OWGR as of 18 September, the last ranking before the Cup

== Thursday's foursomes matches ==
International	Results	United States
Scott/Matsuyama	6 & 5	Cantlay/Schauffele
Im/Conners	2 & 1	Spieth/Thomas
T Kim/Lee	2 & 1	Young/Morikawa
SW Kim/Davis	2 up	Scheffler/Burns
Pendrith/Pereira	1 up	Finau/Homa
1	Foursomes	4
1	Overall	4

== Friday's fourball matches ==
International	Results	United States
Scott/Davis	2 & 1	Spieth/Thomas
Im/Muñoz	tied	Scheffler/Burns
Pereira/Bezuidenhout	tied	Kisner/Young
Matsuyama/T Kim	3 & 2	Cantlay/Schauffele
Conners/Pendrith	1 up	Horschel/Homa
1	Fourball	4
2	Overall	8

== Saturday's matches ==
=== Morning foursomes ===
International	Results	United States
Im/Conners	4 & 3	Spieth/Thomas
Scott/Matsuyama	3 & 2	Young/Morikawa
Lee/T Kim	2 & 1	Scheffler/Burns
SW Kim/Davis	4 & 3	Finau/Homa
2	Foursome	2
4	Overall	10

=== Afternoon fourball ===
International	Results	United States
SW Kim/T Kim	1 up	Cantlay/Schauffele
Matsuyama/Pendrith	4 & 3	Thomas/Spieth
Im/Muñoz	3 & 2	Finau/Kisner
Scott/Davis	1 up	Horschel/Burns
3	Fourball	1
7	Overall	11

== Sunday's singles matches ==
International	Results	United States	Timetable
Kim Si-woo	1 up	Justin Thomas	2nd: 8–12
Cameron Davis	4 & 3	Jordan Spieth	1st: 7–12
Hideki Matsuyama	tied	Sam Burns	4th: 8.5–13.5
Adam Scott	3 & 2	Patrick Cantlay	3rd: 8–13
Sebastián Muñoz	2 & 1	Scottie Scheffler	5th: 9.5–13.5
Taylor Pendrith	3 & 1	Tony Finau	6th: 9.5–14.5
Corey Conners	1 up	Xander Schauffele	7th: 9.5–15.5
Im Sung-jae	1 up	Cameron Young	9th: 11.5–15.5
Lee Kyoung-hoon	3 & 1	Billy Horschel	8th: 10.5–15.5
Tom Kim	1 up	Max Homa	11th: 11.5–17.5
Mito Pereira	3 & 2	Collin Morikawa	10th: 11.5–16.5
Christiaan Bezuidenhout	2 & 1	Kevin Kisner	12th: 12.5–17.5
5.5	Singles	6.5
12.5	Overall	17.5

== Individual player records ==
Each entry refers to the Win–Loss–Tie record of the player.

=== United States ===
Player	Points	Overall	Singles	Foursomes	Fourballs
Sam Burns	1	0–3–2	0–0–1	0–2–0	0–1–1
Patrick Cantlay	3	3–1–0	1–0–0	1–0–0	1–1–0
Tony Finau	3	3–1–0	1–0–0	2–0–0	0–1–0
Max Homa	4	4–0–0	1–0–0	2–0–0	1–0–0
Billy Horschel	1	1–2–0	0–1–0	0–0–0	1–1–0
Kevin Kisner	0.5	0–2–1	0–1–0	0–0–0	0–1–1
Collin Morikawa	2	2–1–0	1–0–0	1–1–0	0–0–0
Xander Schauffele	3	3–1–0	1–0–0	1–0–0	1–1–0
Scottie Scheffler	0.5	0–3–1	0–1–0	0–2–0	0–0–1
Jordan Spieth	5	5–0–0	1–0–0	2–0–0	2–0–0
Justin Thomas	4	4–1–0	0–1–0	2–0–0	2–0–0
Cameron Young	1.5	1–2–1	0–1–0	1–1–0	0–0–1

=== International ===
Player	Points	Overall	Singles	Foursomes	Fourballs
Christiaan Bezuidenhout	1.5	1–0–1	1–0–0	0–0–0	0–0–1
Corey Conners	0	0–4–0	0–1–0	0–2–0	0–1–0
Cameron Davis	2	2–3–0	0–1–0	1–1–0	1–1–0
Im Sung-jae	2.5	2–2–1	1–0–0	0–2–0	1–0–1
Kim Si-woo	3	3–1–0	1–0–0	1–1–0	1–0–0
Tom Kim	2	2–3–0	0–1–0	1–1–0	1–1–0
Lee Kyoung-hoon	2	2–1–0	1–0–0	1–1–0	0–0–0
Hideki Matsuyama	1.5	1–3–1	0–0–1	1–1–0	0–2–0
Sebastián Muñoz	2.5	2–0–1	1–0–0	0–0–0	1–0–1
Taylor Pendrith	0	0–4–0	0–1–0	0–1–0	0–2–0
Mito Pereira	0.5	0–2–1	0–1–0	0–1–0	0–0–1
Adam Scott	2	2–3–0	0–1–0	1–1–0	1–1–0
