= Quail Hollow Club =

Country club and golf course in North Carolina, US

- Location within the United States Location within North Carolina
- 35.116°N 80.842°W

Club information
- Location: Charlotte, North Carolina, U.S.
- Elevation: 600 feet (180 m)
- Established: 1959, 67 years ago
- Type: Private
- Owner: Membership-owned
- Total holes: 18
- Tournaments: Presidents Cup (2022); PGA Championship (2017, 2025); Truist Championship (2003–present); Kemper Open (1969–1979); World Seniors Invitational (1983–1989)
- Greens: Champion G-12 Bermuda
- Fairways: 328 / 419 Bermuda grass
- Website: quailhollowclub.com
- Designed by: George Cobb
- Par: 72
- Length: 7,546 yards (6,900 m)
- Course rating: 76.6
- Slope rating: 145
- Course record: 61 – Rory McIlroy (2015)
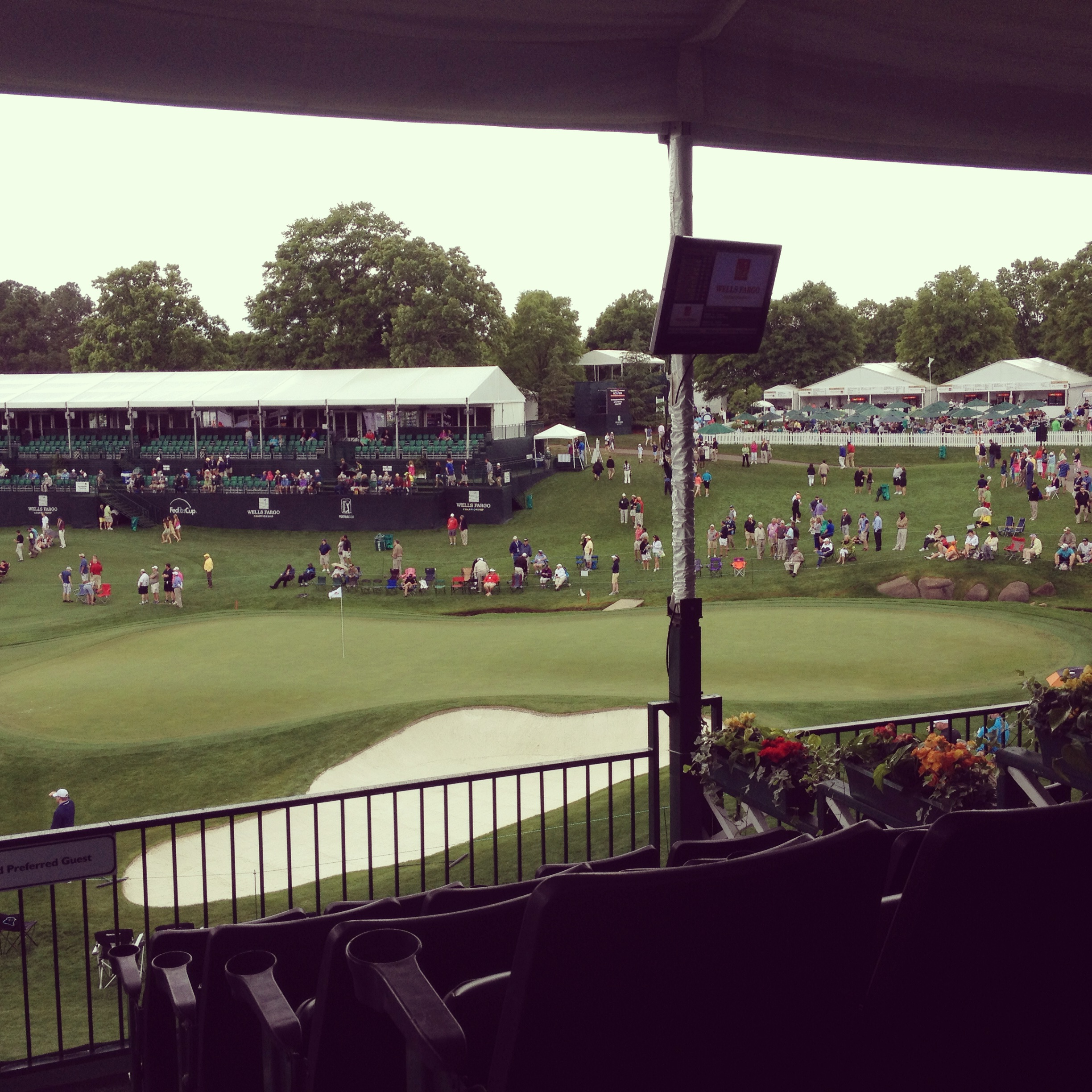
- 18th Green at Quail Hollow Club

Quail Hollow Club is a country club and golf course located in the Quail Hollow neighborhood in Charlotte, North Carolina, United States. It is a private member club founded in 1959, with the golf course opened in 1961.

Quail Hollow has hosted the PGA Tour's Truist Championship (formerly sponsored by Wells Fargo) since 2003, having previously hosted the Kemper Open from 1969 to 1979. It has also hosted the PGA Championship twice (2017 and 2025) and the Presidents Cup in 2022.

== History ==
The foundation of Quail Hollow Club is traced back to a meeting held by James J. Harris on April 13, 1959. The club was officially constituted in January 1960, with the golf course opening the following year. The clubhouse opened on September 14, 1967.

== Golf course ==
The 18-hole championship course at Quail Hollow was designed by golf course architect George Cobb who designed several golf courses, primarily in the southeastern United States. Opened on June 3, 1961, it underwent a series of improvements, including modifications of several holes by Arnold Palmer in 1986, and a redesign by Tom Fazio in 1997, 2003, and from 2014 to 2016 in preparation for the PGA Championship. South of central Charlotte, the average elevation of the course is approximately 600 feet (185 m) above sea level. The course is part of an extensive housing development.

Tee	Rating/Slope	1	2	3	4	5	6	7	8	9	Out	10	11	12	13	14	15	16	17	18	In	Total
2025 PGA	Championship	505	452	483	184	449	249	546	346	530	3,744	592	462	456	205	344	577	529	223	494	3,882	7,626
2026 Truist	Championship	495	452	483	184	449	249	546	346	530	3,734	592	462	456	205	344	577	529	190	494	3,849	7,583
Par		4	4	4	3	4	3	5	4	4	36	5	4	4	3	4	5	4	3	4	36	71
Ⅰ Tees	M:76.6 / 145	498	450	448	183	448	248	538	345	531	3,689	590	458	450	205	343	577	529	218	487	3,857	7,546
Ⅱ Tees	M:73.6 / 138	494	414	417	165	424	226	496	335	421	3,392	542	425	415	179	333	503	455	175	418	3,445	6,837
Ⅲ Tees	M:71.0 / 130 W:77.5 / 144	485	361	384	157	394	201	474	316	386	3,158	507	400	388	163	297	477	413	147	379	3,171	6,329
Ⅳ Tees	M:68.8 / 126 W:74.3 / 138	478	349	361	142	336	169	449	284	367	2,935	462	358	360	152	271	453	348	121	344	2,869	5,804
Ⅴ Tees	M:65.3 / 116 W:70.5 / 127	433	315	335	128	282	143	350	262	282	2,527	395	325	312	134	263	388	300	113	304	2,534	5,061
Par		5	4	4	3	4	3	5	4	4	36	5	4	4	3	4	5	4	3	4	36	72

== Tournaments hosted ==
Quail Hollow hosted the Kemper Open on the PGA Tour from 1969 through 1979, and the senior tour's PaineWebber Invitational from 1983 through 1989. The PGA Tour returned to Quail Hollow in 2003 with the Wachovia Championship, now the Truist Championship, which has been held every year since except 2020 when it was cancelled due to the Coronavirus Pandemic. Additionally the club hosted the 2017 PGA Championship and 2025 PGA Championship with the Truist Championship being held at Eagle Point in Wilmington, North Carolina in 2017 and at Philadelphia Cricket Club in Philadelphia, Pennsylvania in 2025. In 2022, Quail Hollow hosted the fourteenth edition of the Presidents Cup (postponed from 2021 due to the COVID-19 pandemic) with the Truist Championship being held at TPC Potomac at Avenel Farm in Potomac, Maryland.

== Partnerships ==
In December 2023, Penn Entertainment partnered with Quail Hollow in order to receive market access for its ESPN Bet sportsbook in the state of North Carolina. The agreement also made ESPN Bet the official sports betting sponsor of the Truist Championship.
