= Kemper Open =

Former golf tournament on the PGA Tour

Coordinates: 38.989°N 77.202°W

Tournament information
- Location: Potomac, Maryland
- Established: 1968
- Course: TPC Potomac at Avenel Farm
- Par: 71
- Length: 6,889 yards (6,299 m)
- Tour: PGA Tour
- Format: Stroke play
- Prize fund: US$5,000,000
- Month played: June
- Final year: 2006

Tournament record score
- Aggregate: 263 Billy Andrade (1991); 263 Jeff Sluman (1991); 263 Adam Scott (2004)
- To par: −21 as above

Final champion
- (United States) Ben Curtis
- Location in the United States Location in Maryland

The Kemper Open was a golf tournament on the PGA Tour from 1968 to 2006.

Perhaps more so than any other "regular" PGA Tour stop, the event wandered about, not just from course to course within a given metropolitan area, but along the East Coast. Originally sponsored by the Kemper Corporation, the inaugural event was played in 1968 at Pleasant Valley Country Club in Sutton, Massachusetts, before moving to the Quail Hollow Club in Charlotte, North Carolina the following year, where it stayed through 1979. (The Truist Championship is now held in Charlotte.) The event moved in 1980 to Congressional Country Club in Bethesda, Maryland, a suburb northwest of Washington, D.C., and to TPC at Avenel in 1987 in neighboring Potomac.

Kemper Insurance dropped out as sponsor after the 2002 edition and was replaced by Friedman Billings Ramsey, which renamed the event the FBR Capital Open for a single year in 2003. Booz Allen Hamilton became the main sponsor in 2004, with the tournament being titled the Booz Allen Classic. The event returned to Congressional for a year in 2005 to accommodate renovations at Avenel.

The purse in 2006 was $5.0 million, with $900,000 going to the winner; due to rain delays it concluded on Tuesday without a gallery. In 1992, Washington Redskins quarterback Mark Rypien, the reigning Super Bowl MVP, was given a sponsor's exemption into the tournament, but shot rounds of 80 and 91 and missed the cut by 28 strokes. As the Kemper Open, it was often played two or three weeks prior to the U.S. Open, making it a prime tune-up event; later it was either the week prior or after and many top players skipped it.. For 2007, the PGA Tour announced that it would reschedule the event for the fall, and Booz Allen declined to renew its sponsorship. The fall date was in turn canceled to make way for the new AT&T National, to take place at the same time as the Classic had.

Also in 2006, the tournament ended on Tuesday due to persistent storms in the D.C. area. The conclusion of what turned out to be the final Booz Allen Classic was not televised.

A new format (invitation only), new host for the tournament (Tiger Woods), and a return to Congressional Country Club marked the July 2007 stop in Washington for the FedEx Cup, the AT&T National. For record-keeping purposes, it is not a "successor" tournament officially, even though it is the "new" tour stop in the same region.

During the 1970s, the Kemper Open was among the highest purses on tour, exceeding the majors.

== Tournament highlights ==
- 1968: Arnold Palmer shoots a final round 67 to win the inaugural version of the tournament. He finishes four shots ahead of Bruce Crampton and Art Wall Jr.
- 1971: Tom Weiskopf wins his first Kemper Open title in a four-way sudden death playoff. He makes an eight-foot birdie putt on the first extra hole to beat Lee Trevino, Gary Player, and Dale Douglass.
- 1972: Doug Sanders rolls in a 30-foot birdie putt on the 72nd hole to edge Lee Trevino by one shot. It would be Sanders 20th and final PGA Tour triumph.
- 1975: Raymond Floyd holes a 100-foot chip shot for eagle during the final round on his way to a three-shot victory over Gary Player and John Mahaffey. It is Floyd's first PGA Tour win since his 1969 PGA Championship triumph.
- 1977: Tom Weiskopf wins the Kemper Open for a third time. He beats Bill Rogers and George Burns by two shots.
- 1980: John Mahaffey wins the first Kemper Open played at the Congressional Country Club. He beats Craig Stadler by three shots.
- 1982: Craig Stadler becomes the first Kemper Open winner to successfully defend his title. He beats Seve Ballesteros by seven shots.
- 1983: This edition of the tournament may have been the most bizarre. Fred Couples, Scott Simpson, and Chen Tze-chung playing together in the final group finished over one hour later than the previous group on the golf course. In spite of rounds of 77, 76, and 77 all three players finished tied for first along with Gil Morgan and Barry Jaeckel who had finished their rounds several hours earlier. Jaeckel, who spent time in a bar waiting for regulation play to conclude, is eliminated on the first playoff hole after he hits a wild tee shot. On the second hole, Couples scores a birdie to win his first PGA Tour title.
- 1984: Greg Norman wins his first PGA Tour event, beating out Mark O'Meara by five shots, despite shooting a final round 73.
- 1985: Bill Glasson sinks a 50-foot birdie putt on the 72nd hole to finish a 7-shot comeback and earn his first PGA Tour triumph. He beats Larry Mize and Corey Pavin by one shot.
- 1986: Greg Norman wins the Kemper Open for a second time by defeating Larry Mize on the sixth hole of a sudden death playoff. Less than one year later, Mize would avenge his loss to Norman at the 1987 Masters Tournament.
- 1988: Tom Kite's bid to successfully defend his Kemper Open title is foiled when Morris Hatalsky beats him on the second hole of a sudden death playoff.
- 1992: Bill Glasson becomes the first and only tournament champion to win an edition of the tournament at both Congressional Country Club and TPC at Avenel. Glasson wins by one shot over Howard Twitty, Ken Green, Mike Springer, and John Daly.
- 1995: Lee Janzen birdies the 72nd hole to earn a spot in a sudden death playoff with Corey Pavin. Janzen then birdies the first playoff hole to earn the victory.
- 1996: Future number two ranked player in the world, Steve Stricker, wins for the first time on the PGA Tour. He beats Mark O'Meara, Grant Waite, Scott Hoch, and Brad Faxon by three shots.
- 1997: Justin Leonard wins for the second time on the PGA Tour after Mark Wiebe misses two-foot par putts on both the 71st and 72nd holes to finish one shot behind.
- 1999: Rich Beem becomes the first PGA Tour rookie to win the tournament. His four round scoring total of 274 (−10) is good enough for a one-stroke triumph over Bradley Hughes and Bill Glasson.
- 2004: Adam Scott shoots a 72-hole tournament scoring record 263 on his way to a four-shot victory over Charles Howell III.

== Winners ==
Year	Winner	Score	To par	Margin of victory	Runner(s)-up	Winner's share ($)	Venue
Booz Allen Classic
2006	(United States) Ben Curtis	264	−20	5 strokes	(United States) Billy Andrade (Australia) Nick O'Hern (Republic of Ireland) Pádraig Harrington (United States) Steve Stricker	900,000	TPC at Avenel
2005	(Spain) Sergio García	270	−14	2 strokes	(United States) Ben Crane (United States) Davis Love III (Australia) Adam Scott	900,000	Congressional (Blue Course)
2004	(Australia) Adam Scott	263	−21	4 strokes	(United States) Charles Howell III	864,000	TPC at Avenel
FBR Capital Open
2003	(South Africa) Rory Sabbatini	270	−14	4 strokes	(United States) Joe Durant (United States) Fred Funk (United States) Duffy Waldorf	810,000	TPC at Avenel
Kemper Insurance Open
2002	(United States) Bob Estes	273	−11	1 stroke	(United States) Rich Beem	648,000	TPC at Avenel
2001	(United States) Frank Lickliter	268	−16	1 stroke	(United States) J. J. Henry	630,000	TPC at Avenel
2000	(United States) Tom Scherrer	271	−13	2 strokes	(Australia) Greg Chalmers (Japan) Kazuhiko Hosokawa (United States) Franklin Langham (United States) Justin Leonard (United States) Steve Lowery	540,000	TPC at Avenel
Kemper Open
1999	(United States) Rich Beem	274	−10	1 stroke	(United States) Bill Glasson (Australia) Bradley Hughes	450,000	TPC at Avenel
1998	(Australia) Stuart Appleby	274	−10	1 stroke	(United States) Scott Hoch	360,000	TPC at Avenel
1997	(United States) Justin Leonard	274	−10	1 stroke	(United States) Mark Wiebe	270,000	TPC at Avenel
1996	(United States) Steve Stricker	270	−14	3 strokes	(United States) Brad Faxon (United States) Scott Hoch (United States) Mark O'Meara (New Zealand) Grant Waite	270,000	TPC at Avenel
1995	(United States) Lee Janzen	272	−12	Playoff	(United States) Corey Pavin	252,000	TPC at Avenel
1994	(United States) Mark Brooks	271	−13	3 strokes	(United States) Bobby Wadkins (United States) D. A. Weibring	234,000	TPC at Avenel
1993	(New Zealand) Grant Waite	275	−9	1 stroke	(United States) Tom Kite	234,000	TPC at Avenel
1992	(United States) Bill Glasson (2)	276	−8	1 stroke	(United States) John Daly (United States) Ken Green (United States) Mike Springer (United States) Howard Twitty	198,000	TPC at Avenel
1991	(United States) Billy Andrade	263	−21	Playoff	(United States) Jeff Sluman	180,000	TPC at Avenel
1990	(United States) Gil Morgan	274	−10	1 stroke	(Australia) Ian Baker-Finch	180,000	TPC at Avenel
1989	(United States) Tom Byrum	268	−16	5 strokes	(United States) Tommy Armour III (United States) Billy Ray Brown (United States) Jim Thorpe	162,000	TPC at Avenel
1988	(United States) Morris Hatalsky	274	−10	Playoff	(United States) Tom Kite	144,000	TPC at Avenel
1987	(United States) Tom Kite	270	−14	7 strokes	(United States) Chris Perry (United States) Howard Twitty	126,000	TPC at Avenel
1986	(Australia) Greg Norman (2)	277	−11	Playoff	(United States) Larry Mize	90,000	Congressional
1985	(United States) Bill Glasson	278	−10	1 stroke	(United States) Larry Mize (United States) Corey Pavin	90,000	Congressional
1984	(Australia) Greg Norman	280	−8	5 strokes	(United States) Mark O'Meara	72,000	Congressional
1983	(United States) Fred Couples	287	−1	Playoff	(Taiwan) Chen Tze-chung (United States) Barry Jaeckel (United States) Gil Morgan (United States) Scott Simpson	72,000	Congressional
1982	(United States) Craig Stadler (2)	275	−13	7 strokes	(Spain) Seve Ballesteros	72,000	Congressional
1981	(United States) Craig Stadler	270	−10	6 strokes	(United States) Tom Watson (United States) Tom Weiskopf	72,000	Congressional
1980	(United States) John Mahaffey	275	−5	3 strokes	(United States) Craig Stadler	72,000	Congressional
1979	(United States) Jerry McGee	272	−16	1 stroke	(United States) Jerry Pate	63,000	Quail Hollow Club
1978	(United States) Andy Bean	273	−15	5 strokes	(United States) Mark Hayes (United States) Andy North	60,000	Quail Hollow Club
1977	(United States) Tom Weiskopf (3)	277	−11	2 strokes	(United States) George Burns (United States) Bill Rogers	50,000	Quail Hollow Club
1976	(United States) Joe Inman	277	−11	1 stroke	(United States) Grier Jones (United States) Tom Weiskopf	50,000	Quail Hollow Club
1975	(United States) Raymond Floyd	278	−10	3 strokes	(United States) John Mahaffey (South Africa) Gary Player	50,000	Quail Hollow Club
1974	(United States) Bob Menne	270	−18	Playoff	(United States) Jerry Heard	50,000	Quail Hollow Club
1973	(United States) Tom Weiskopf (2)	271	−17	3 strokes	(United States) Lanny Wadkins	40,000	Quail Hollow Club
1972	(United States) Doug Sanders	275	−13	1 stroke	(United States) Lee Trevino	35,000	Quail Hollow Club
1971	(United States) Tom Weiskopf	277	−11	Playoff	(United States) Dale Douglass (South Africa) Gary Player (United States) Lee Trevino	30,000	Quail Hollow Club
1970	(United States) Dick Lotz	278	−10	1 stroke	(United States) Lou Graham (United States) Larry Hinson (United States) Grier Jones (United States) Tom Weiskopf	30,000	Quail Hollow Club
1969	(United States) Dale Douglass	274	−14	4 strokes	(United States) Charles Coody	30,000	Quail Hollow Club
1968	(United States) Arnold Palmer	276	−12	4 strokes	(Australia) Bruce Crampton (United States) Art Wall Jr.	30,000	Pleasant Valley
