= Bill Glasson (golfer) =

American professional golfer (born 1960)

Personal information
- Full name: William Lee Glasson Jr.
- Nationality: United States
- Born: April 29, 1960 (age 66) Fresno, California, U.S.
- Height: 5 ft 11 in (1.80 m)
- Weight: 175 lb (79 kg; 12.5 st)

Career
- Sport: Golf
- College: Oral Roberts University
- Turned professional: 1983
- Former tours: PGA Tour; PGA Tour Champions
- Professional wins: 9
- Highest ranking: 25 (July 18, 1999)

Number of wins by tour
- PGA Tour: 7
- Other: 2

Best results in major championships
- Masters Tournament: T18: 1994, 1999
- PGA Championship: T13: 1998
- U.S. Open: T4: 1995
- The Open Championship: T25: 1995

Achievements and awards
- PGA Tour Comeback Player of the Year: 1997

William Lee Glasson Jr. (born April 29, 1960) is an American professional golfer who won several tournaments on the PGA Tour.

== Early life and amateur career ==
In 1960, Glasson was born in Fresno, California. He attended Oral Roberts University in Tulsa, Oklahoma where he was a member of the golf team – a two-time All-American.

== Professional career ==
In 1983, Glasson turned professional. He had success at 1983 PGA Tour Qualifying School and joined the PGA Tour. In 1984, he led the PGA Tour for driving distance.

Glasson has enjoyed nine victories as a professional golfer: seven official PGA Tour events and two non-official events. His first win came at the 1985 Kemper Open. Trailing seven strokes behind the leader Larry Mize with 14 holes to play, Glasson made a 45-foot birdie putt on the 18th hole for a round of 66 to finish one stroke ahead of Mize and Corey Pavin.

Glasson won a second Kemper Open in 1992 fending off a playoff challenge from John Daly. His best finish in a major is a tie for 4th place at the 1995 U.S. Open. Glasson has over 60 top-10 PGA Tour finishes and has earned more than $6.7 million in career earnings. He was featured in the top 50 of the Official World Golf Ranking. His last win on the Tour was in 1997 at the Las Vegas Invitational.

Glasson experienced difficulty maintaining his PGA Tour privileges in his 40s, due in large part to medical problems. He needed to play some on the Nationwide Tour, where his best finish was 2nd place at the 2003 Northeast Pennsylvania Classic. Glasson has undergone at least 19 surgeries on various parts of his body including elbow, sinus, knee, lip, forearm and lower back. In 1994 Glasson said, "For me, breakfast is a bowl of Advil."

He began playing on the Champions Tour after his 50th birthday on April 29, 2010.

== Personal life ==
Glasson lives in Stillwater, Oklahoma.

== Awards and honors ==
In 1997, Glasson earned the PGA Tour's Comeback Player of the Year Award.

== Professional wins (9) ==
=== PGA Tour wins (7) ===
No.	Date	Tournament	Winning score	Margin of victory	Runner(s)-up
1	Jun 2, 1985	Kemper Open	−10 (72-70-70-66=278)	1 stroke	(United States) Larry Mize, (United States) Corey Pavin
2	Sep 25, 1988	B.C. Open	−16 (66-68-65-69=268)	2 strokes	(United States) Wayne Levi, (United States) Bruce Lietzke
3	Nov 13, 1988	Centel Classic	−16 (67-69-68-68=272)	2 strokes	(United States) Tommy Armour III
4	Feb 26, 1989	Doral-Ryder Open	−13 (71-65-67-72=275)	1 stroke	(United States) Fred Couples
5	May 31, 1992	Kemper Open (2)	−8 (69-68-71-68=276)	1 stroke	(United States) John Daly, (United States) Ken Green, (United States) Mike Springer, (United States) Howard Twitty
6	Jan 30, 1994	Phoenix Open	−16 (68-68-68-64=268)	3 strokes	(United States) Bob Estes
7	Oct 26, 1997	Las Vegas Invitational	−20 (63-65-75-71-66=340)	4 strokes	(United States) David Edwards, (United States) Billy Mayfair

=== Other wins (2) ===
- 1984 Northern California Open
- 1989 JCPenney Classic (with Pat Bradley)

== Results in major championships ==
Tournament	1984	1985	1986	1987	1988	1989
Masters Tournament			T25			CUT
U.S. Open	T25	T39	T53	CUT		T21
The Open Championship						
PGA Championship		T54	CUT		WD	

Tournament	1990	1991	1992	1993	1994	1995	1996	1997	1998	1999
Masters Tournament	T33			CUT	T18	CUT	CUT		CUT	T18
U.S. Open	T51			CUT		T4				CUT
The Open Championship	CUT					T25				
PGA Championship	WD				T19	CUT			T13	WD

Tournament	2000	2001	2002	2003	2004	2005
Masters Tournament						
U.S. Open						T67
The Open Championship						
PGA Championship	T64					

Top 10
Did not play

CUT = missed the half-way cut
WD = withdrew
"T" = tied

=== Summary ===
Tournament	Wins	2nd	3rd	Top-5	Top-10	Top-25	Events	Cuts made
Masters Tournament	0	0	0	0	0	3	9	4
U.S. Open	0	0	0	1	1	3	10	7
The Open Championship	0	0	0	0	0	1	2	1
PGA Championship	0	0	0	0	0	2	9	4
Totals	0	0	0	1	1	9	30	16

- Most consecutive cuts made – 5 (1984 U.S. Open – 1986 U.S. Open)
- Longest streak of top-10s – 1

== Results in The Players Championship ==
Tournament	1985	1986	1987	1988	1989	1990	1991	1992	1993	1994	1995	1996	1997	1998	1999	2000	2001
The Players Championship	CUT	CUT	T7	CUT	WD	T24	T41		CUT	CUT	CUT	CUT			CUT	T57	CUT

Top 10
Did not play

CUT = missed the halfway cut
WD = withdrew
"T" indicates a tie for a place

== Results in World Golf Championships ==
Tournament	1999
Match Play	R16
Championship	
Invitational	

Top 10
Did not play

QF, R16, R32, R64 = Round in which player lost in match play

== See also ==
- 1983 PGA Tour Qualifying School graduates
- 1984 PGA Tour Qualifying School graduates
- 2004 PGA Tour Qualifying School graduates
- 2005 PGA Tour Qualifying School graduates
