= 2014 FedEx Cup Playoffs =

Tournament information
- Dates: August 21 – September 14, 2014
- Location: Ridgewood Country Club; TPC Boston; Cherry Hills Country Club; East Lake Golf Club
- Tour: PGA Tour

Statistics
- Field: 125 for The Barclays; 100 for Deutsche Bank; 70 for BMW Championship; 30 for Tour Championship
- Prize fund: $35,000,000 bonus money
- Winner's share: $10,000,000 bonus money

Champion
- (United States) Billy Horschel
- 4,750 points

The 2014 FedEx Cup Playoffs was the series of four golf tournaments that determined the season champion on the U.S.-based PGA Tour. It was played from August 21 to September 14 and comprised the following four events:

- The Barclays – Ridgewood Country Club, Paramus, New Jersey
- Deutsche Bank Championship – TPC Boston, Norton, Massachusetts
- BMW Championship – Cherry Hills Country Club, Englewood, Colorado
- Tour Championship – East Lake Golf Club, Atlanta, Georgia

These were the eighth FedEx Cup playoffs since their inception in 2007.

The point distributions can be seen here.

== Regular season rankings ==
| Place | Player | Points | Events |
|---|---|---|---|
| 1 | (Northern Ireland) Rory McIlroy | 2,582 | 13 |
| 2 | (United States) Jimmy Walker | 2,493 | 23 |
| 3 | (United States) Bubba Watson | 2,173 | 17 |
| 4 | (United States) Matt Kuchar | 1,921 | 20 |
| 5 | (United States) Jim Furyk | 1,851 | 17 |
| 6 | (United States) Dustin Johnson | 1,769 | 17 |
| 7 | (Spain) Sergio García | 1,700 | 13 |
| 8 | (United States) Jordan Spieth | 1,692 | 23 |
| 9 | (United States) Patrick Reed | 1,666 | 24 |
| 10 | (United States) Chris Kirk | 1,571 | 24 |

== The Barclays ==
The Barclays was played August 21–24. Of the 125 players eligible to play in the event, three did not enter: Dustin Johnson (ranked 6), Jason Dufner (57) and Steve Stricker (103). Of the 122 entrants, 79 made the second-round cut at 143 (+1). With more than 78 players making the cut the field was further reduced to 70 after the third round.

Hunter Mahan won by two strokes over Stuart Appleby, Jason Day, and Cameron Tringale and moved from 62nd place to first place in the standings. The top 100 players in the points standings advanced to the Deutsche Bank Championship. This included seven players who were outside the top 100 prior to The Barclays: Bo Van Pelt (ranked 104th to 73rd), Stewart Cink (109 to 77), Andrés Romero (110 to 92), Danny Lee (116 to 96), Paul Casey (118 to 85), Gonzalo Fernández-Castaño (119 to 81), and Morgan Hoffmann (124 to 72). Seven players started the tournament within the top 100 but ended the tournament outside the top 100, ending their playoff chances: Jonas Blixt (ranked 92nd to 102nd), Kevin Kisner (93 to 104), Nick Watney (94 to 105), Luke Guthrie (95 to 106), Retief Goosen (96 to 103), Rory Sabbatini (97 to 108), and Brian Davis (100 to 110).

| | | | | | FedEx Cup rank | |
| Place | Player | Score | To par | Winnings ($) | After | Before |
|---|---|---|---|---|---|---|
| 1 | (United States) Hunter Mahan | 66-71-68-65=270 | −14 | 1,440,000 | 1 | 62 |
| T2 | (Australia) Stuart Appleby | 73-66-68-65=272 | −12 | 597,333 | 19 | 98 |
| T2 | (Australia) Jason Day | 72-64-68-68=272 | −12 | 597,333 | 7 | 34 |
| T2 | (United States) Cameron Tringale | 66-68-72-66=272 | −12 | 597,333 | 10 | 61 |
| T5 | (South Africa) Ernie Els | 68-68-71-66=273 | −11 | 292,000 | 39 | 91 |
| T5 | (United States) Matt Kuchar | 68-70-68-67=273 | −11 | 292,000 | 4 | 4 |
| T5 | (United States) William McGirt | 68-71-68-66=273 | −11 | 292,000 | 35 | 81 |
| 8 | (United States) Jim Furyk | 66-69-69-70=274 | −10 | 248,000 | 6 | 5 |
| T9 | (United States) Rickie Fowler | 68-73-67-67=275 | −9 | 208,000 | 11 | 16 |
| T9 | (United States) Morgan Hoffmann | 70-70-66-69=275 | −9 | 208,000 | 72 | 124 |
| T9 | (United States) Kevin Na | 70-66-70-69=275 | −9 | 208,000 | 13 | 20 |
| T9 | (United States) Patrick Reed | 71-66-73-65=275 | −9 | 208,000 | 8 | 9 |

- Par 71 course

== Deutsche Bank Championship ==
The Deutsche Bank Championship was played August 29 – September 1. Of the 100 players eligible to play in the event, seven did not play: Dustin Johnson (ranked 14), Sergio García (15), Justin Rose (20), Tim Clark (38), Graeme McDowell (40), Jason Dufner (74), and Paul Casey (85). Of the 93 entrants, 80 made the second-round cut at 145 (+3). The field was further reduced to 73 after the third round.

Chris Kirk won by two strokes over Russell Henley, Billy Horschel, and Geoff Ogilvy and moved into first place in the standings. The top 70 players in the points standings advanced to the BMW Championship. This included six players who were outside the top 70 prior to the Deutsche Bank Championship: Horschel (82 to 20), Ogilvy (100 to 24), Chesson Hadley (84 to 57), Carl Pettersson (93 to 66), Morgan Hoffmann (72 to 68), and Ben Crane (78 to 69). Six players started the tournament within the top 70 but ended the tournament outside the top 70, ending their playoff chances: Ryo Ishikawa (56 to 72), Justin Hicks (58 to 75), Ben Martin (63 to 76), Scott Langley (65 to 77), Shawn Stefani (67 to 83), and Scott Brown (70 to 85).

| | | | | | FedEx Cup rank | |
| Place | Player | Score | To par | Winnings ($) | After | Before |
|---|---|---|---|---|---|---|
| 1 | (United States) Chris Kirk | 73-66-64-66=269 | −15 | 1,440,000 | 1 | 17 |
| T2 | (United States) Russell Henley | 70-66-65-70-271 | −13 | 597,333 | 14 | 62 |
| T2 | (United States) Billy Horschel | 69-66-67-69=271 | −13 | 597,333 | 20 | 82 |
| T2 | (Australia) Geoff Ogilvy | 70-71-65-65=271 | −13 | 597,333 | 24 | 100 |
| T5 | (Northern Ireland) Rory McIlroy | 70-69-64-70=273 | −11 | 304,000 | 2 | 2 |
| T5 | (Australia) John Senden | 69-71-67-66=273 | −11 | 304,000 | 16 | 28 |
| T7 | (Australia) Jason Day | 66-68-69-71=274 | −10 | 258,000 | 7 | 7 |
| T7 | (Germany) Martin Kaymer | 71-66-70-67=274 | −10 | 258,000 | 15 | 23 |
| T9 | (United States) Bill Haas | 67-69-70-69=275 | −9 | 185,143 | 17 | 21 |
| T9 | (United States) Chesson Hadley | 66-73-67-69=275 | −9 | 185,143 | 57 | 84 |
| T9 | (South Korea) Seung-Yul Noh | 69-68-68-70=275 | −9 | 185,143 | 36 | 47 |
| T9 | (Sweden) Carl Pettersson | 67-73-69-66=275 | −9 | 185,143 | 66 | 93 |
| T9 | (United States) Webb Simpson | 66-70-68-71=275 | −9 | 185,143 | 19 | 22 |
| T9 | (United States) Robert Streb | 73-67-67-68=275 | −9 | 185,143 | 71 | 97 |
| T9 | (United States) Jimmy Walker | 70-70-68-67=275 | −9 | 185,143 | 4 | 3 |

- Par 71 course

== BMW Championship ==
The BMW Championship was played September 4–7. Of the 70 players eligible to play in the event, only one, Dustin Johnson (ranked 22), did not play. There was no cut.

Billy Horschel won by two strokes over Bubba Watson and moved to second on the points list. Two players played their way into the Tour Championship: Morgan Hoffmann (ranked 68 to ranked 21) and Ryan Palmer (37 to 23). Two players played their way out of the Tour Championship: Stuart Appleby (26 to 31) and Keegan Bradley (28 to 33). Hoffmann, who started the playoffs ranked 124th, played his way into each playoff event.

The top 30 players in FedEx Cup points after this event advanced to the Tour Championship and also earned spots in the 2015 Masters Tournament, U.S. Open, and (British) Open Championship.

The FedEx Cup points were reset after the BMW Championship. Points were allocated according to a player's position in the standings. The player in first place has 2,500 points, and the player in 30th has 210. This means that all 30 remaining players will have at least a mathematical chance to secure the season crown, and any of the top five players can claim the FedEx Cup with a win in the Tour Championship.

| | | | | | FedEx Cup rank | |
| Place | Player | Score | To par | Winnings ($) | After | Before |
|---|---|---|---|---|---|---|
| 1 | (United States) Billy Horschel | 68-66-63-69=266 | −14 | 1,440,000 | 2 | 20 |
| 2 | (United States) Bubba Watson | 70-66-66-66=268 | −12 | 864,000 | 3 | 6 |
| 3 | (United States) Morgan Hoffmann | 72-72-62-63=269 | −11 | 544,000 | 21 | 68 |
| T4 | (United States) Rickie Fowler | 71-66-66-68=271 | −9 | 319,000 | 9 | 10 |
| T4 | (United States) Jim Furyk | 70-68-67-66=271 | −9 | 319,000 | 7 | 8 |
| T4 | (Spain) Sergio García | 68-64-72-67=271 | −9 | 319,000 | 13 | 23 |
| T4 | (United States) Ryan Palmer | 69-64-67-71=271 | −9 | 319,000 | 23 | 37 |
| T8 | (Northern Ireland) Rory McIlroy | 67-67-72-66=272 | −8 | 232,000 | 4 | 2 |
| T8 | (Australia) Adam Scott | 71-66-69-66=272 | −8 | 232,000 | 12 | 13 |
| T8 | (United States) Jordan Spieth | 67-70-68-67=272 | −8 | 232,000 | 11 | 9 |

- Par 72 course

== Reset points ==
The points were reset after the BMW Championship.

| Place | Player | Points | Reset points | Events |
|---|---|---|---|---|
| 1 | (United States) Chris Kirk | 4,314 | 2,500 | 27 |
| 2 | (United States) Billy Horschel | 4,305 | 2,250 | 26 |
| 3 | (United States) Bubba Watson | 4,058 | 2,000 | 20 |
| 4 | (Northern Ireland) Rory McIlroy | 3,735 | 1,800 | 16 |
| 5 | (United States) Hunter Mahan | 3,363 | 1,600 | 24 |
| 6 | (United States) Jimmy Walker | 3,073 | 1,400 | 26 |
| 7 | (United States) Jim Furyk | 3,073 | 1,200 | 20 |
| 8 | (United States) Matt Kuchar | 2,736 | 1,000 | 23 |
| 9 | (United States) Rickie Fowler | 2,631 | 800 | 25 |
| 10 | (Australia) Jason Day | 2,549 | 600 | 14 |

== Tour Championship ==
The Tour Championship was played September 11−14. Of the 30 players eligible to play in the event, only one, Dustin Johnson (ranked 30), did not play. There was no cut. Billy Horschel won the tournament by three strokes over Jim Furyk and Rory McIlroy. After starting the playoffs in 69th place and missing the cut in the first playoff tournament, Horschel finished T-2, win, and win in the next three events to win the FedEx Cup.

| | | | | | FedEx Cup rank | |
| Place | Player | Score | To par | Winnings ($) | After | Before |
|---|---|---|---|---|---|---|
| 1 | (United States) Billy Horschel | 66-66-69-68=269 | −11 | 1,440,000 | 1 | 2 |
| T2 | (United States) Jim Furyk | 67-69-67-69=272 | −8 | 708,000 | 4 | 7 |
| T2 | (Northern Ireland) Rory McIlroy | 69-65-67-71=272 | −8 | 708,000 | 3 | 4 |
| T4 | (Australia) Jason Day | 67-67-70-69=273 | −7 | 343,333 | 10 | 10 |
| T4 | (United States) Chris Kirk | 66-68-71-68=273 | −7 | 343,333 | 2 | 1 |
| T4 | (England) Justin Rose | 72-66-66-69=273 | −7 | 343,333 | 11 | 26 |
| 7 | (United States) Ryan Palmer | 69-67-69-69=274 | −6 | 275,000 | 14 | 23 |
| 8 | (United States) Rickie Fowler | 69-68-67-71=275 | −5 | 260,000 | 9 | 9 |
| T9 | (Spain) Sergio García | 69-71-70-66=276 | −4 | 231,667 | 13 | 13 |
| T9 | (Australia) Adam Scott | 69-72-65-70=276 | −4 | 231,667 | 12 | 12 |
| T9 | (United States) Gary Woodland | 71-75-63-67=276 | −4 | 231,667 | 22 | 29 |

- Par 70 course

== Final leaderboard ==
| Place | Player | Points | Winnings ($) |
|---|---|---|---|
| 1 | (United States) Billy Horschel | 4,750 | 10,000,000 |
| 2 | (United States) Chris Kirk | 3,100 | 3,000,000 |
| 3 | (Northern Ireland) Rory McIlroy | 3,050 | 2,000,000 |
| 4 | (United States) Jim Furyk | 2,450 | 1,500,000 |
| 5 | (United States) Bubba Watson | 2,285 | 1,000,000 |
| 6 | (United States) Hunter Mahan | 1,835 | 800,000 |
| 7 | (United States) Jimmy Walker | 1,668 | 700,000 |
| 8 | (United States) Matt Kuchar | 1,300 | 600,000 |
| 9 | (United States) Rickie Fowler | 1,225 | 550,000 |
| 10 | (Australia) Jason Day | 1,200 | 500,000 |

For the full list see here.

== Table of qualifying players ==
Table key:

Win
Top-10 finish
Did not advance to next tournament
Played way into next tournament

| | Player | Pre-Playoffs | | The Barclays | | Deutsche Bank | | BMW Champ. | | Reset points | Tour Champ. | |
| | Player | Points | Rank | Finish | Rank after | Finish | Rank after | Finish | Rank after | Reset points | Finish | Final rank |
|---|---|---|---|---|---|---|---|---|---|---|---|---|
| (Northern Ireland) | Rory McIlroy | 2,582 | 1 | T22 | 2 | T5 | 2 | T8 | 4 | 1,800 | T2 | 3 |
| (United States) | Jimmy Walker | 2,493 | 2 | CUT | 3 | T9 | 4 | T20 | 6 | 1,400 | T17 | 7 |
| (United States) | Bubba Watson | 2,173 | 3 | T30 | 5 | T29 | 6 | 2 | 3 | 2,000 | 14 | 5 |
| (United States) | Matt Kuchar | 1,921 | 4 | T5 | 4 | T29 | 5 | T46 | 8 | 1,000 | 13 | 8 |
| (United States) | Jim Furyk | 1,851 | 5 | 8 | 6 | T23 | 8 | T4 | 7 | 1,200 | T2 | 4 |
| (United States) | Dustin Johnson | 1,769 | 6 | DNP | 14 | DNP | 22 | DNP | 30 | 210 | DNP | 30 |
| (Spain) | Sergio García | 1,700 | 7 | T57 | 15 | DNP | 23 | T4 | 13 | 440 | T9 | 13 |
| (United States) | Jordan Spieth | 1,692 | 8 | T22 | 9 | T29 | 9 | T8 | 11 | 480 | T27 | 15 |
| (United States) | Patrick Reed | 1,666 | 9 | T9 | 8 | T74^{†} | 12 | T53 | 18 | 340 | T19 | 21 |
| (United States) | Chris Kirk | 1,571 | 10 | T53 | 17 | 1 | 1 | T36 | 1 | 2,500 | T4 | 2 |
| (United States) | Zach Johnson | 1,552 | 11 | T22 | 12 | T16 | 11 | T43 | 15 | 400 | 21 | 18 |
| (United States) | Brendon Todd* | 1,542 | 12 | T46 | 18 | CUT | 25 | T36 | 27 | 240 | T17 | 27 |
| (United States) | Webb Simpson | 1,536 | 13 | CUT | 22 | T9 | 19 | T53 | 22 | 290 | T23 | 25 |
| (Germany) | Martin Kaymer | 1,525 | 14 | CUT | 23 | T7 | 15 | T16 | 14 | 420 | T23 | 16 |
| (Australia) | Adam Scott | 1,479 | 15 | T15 | 16 | T16 | 13 | T8 | 12 | 460 | T9 | 12 |
| (United States) | Rickie Fowler | 1,471 | 16 | T9 | 11 | T23 | 10 | T4 | 9 | 800 | 8 | 9 |
| (United States) | Harris English | 1,469 | 17 | CUT | 25 | CUT | 31 | T31 | 32 | – | – | 32 |
| (England) | Justin Rose | 1,447 | 18 | T30 | 20 | DNP | 27 | 35 | 26 | 250 | T4 | 11 |
| (United States) | Ryan Moore | 1,421 | 19 | CUT | 26 | 73 | 34 | T50 | 39 | – | – | 39 |
| (United States) | Kevin Na | 1,413 | 20 | T9 | 13 | CUT | 21 | T46 | 24 | 270 | T19 | 24 |
| (United States) | Brian Harman | 1,349 | 21 | T57 | 27 | T65 | 33 | T43 | 36 | – | – | 36 |
| (Japan) | Hideki Matsuyama* | 1,287 | 22 | T30 | 24 | T57 | 30 | T20 | 28 | 230 | 22 | 28 |
| (United States) | Keegan Bradley | 1,278 | 23 | T53 | 29 | T16 | 28 | WD | 33 | – | – | 33 |
| (United States) | Bill Haas | 1,268 | 24 | T15 | 21 | T9 | 17 | T16 | 16 | 380 | 16 | 16 |
| (United States) | Matt Every | 1,250 | 25 | CUT | 32 | 80^{†} | 39 | T50 | 45 | – | – | 45 |
| (Australia) | John Senden | 1,157 | 26 | T22 | 28 | T5 | 16 | T23 | 17 | 360 | 26 | 23 |
| (Australia) | Marc Leishman | 1,137 | 27 | CUT | 36 | T65 | 47 | T53 | 58 | – | – | 58 |
| (Canada) | Graham DeLaet | 1,113 | 28 | CUT | 37 | T50 | 43 | 11 | 37 | – | – | 37 |
| (South Africa) | Tim Clark | 1,111 | 29 | WD | 38 | DNP | 51 | T36 | 54 | – | – | 54 |
| (United States) | Ryan Palmer | 1,068 | 30 | T74^{†} | 43 | T16 | 37 | T4 | 23 | 280 | 7 | 14 |
| (United States) | Kevin Stadler | 1,067 | 31 | T46 | 34 | T16 | 32 | T50 | 38 | – | – | 38 |
| (United States) | Gary Woodland | 1,059 | 32 | T13 | 30 | T29 | 29 | T23 | 29 | 220 | T9 | 22 |
| (United States) | Charles Howell III | 1,042 | 33 | T22 | 31 | T35 | 35 | T36 | 34 | – | – | 34 |
| (Australia) | Jason Day | 1,028 | 34 | T2 | 7 | T7 | 7 | WD | 10 | 600 | T4 | 10 |
| (United States) | Charley Hoffman | 1,026 | 35 | T30 | 33 | CUT | 41 | T53 | 53 | – | – | 53 |
| (United States) | J. B. Holmes | 1,007 | 36 | CUT | 48 | T35 | 46 | T12 | 42 | – | – | 42 |
| (Colombia) | Camilo Villegas | 1,002 | 37 | CUT | 49 | T50 | 54 | T20 | 48 | – | – | 48 |
| (Sweden) | Freddie Jacobson | 987 | 38 | CUT | 51 | 79^{†} | 63 | T53 | 66 | – | – | 66 |
| (United States) | Kevin Streelman | 972 | 39 | T46 | 42 | T26 | 38 | T59 | 44 | – | – | 44 |
| (Australia) | Matt Jones | 970 | 40 | CUT | 54 | 78^{†} | 67 | T53 | 67 | – | – | 67 |
| (United States) | George McNeill | 962 | 41 | CUT | 55 | T29 | 48 | T31 | 46 | – | – | 46 |
| (South Korea) | Noh Seung-yul | 950 | 42 | T53 | 47 | T9 | 36 | T23 | 35 | – | – | 35 |
| (Northern Ireland) | Graeme McDowell | 948 | 43 | T38 | 40 | DNP | 53 | T36 | 56 | – | – | 56 |
| (United States) | Justin Hicks | 923 | 44 | CUT | 58 | CUT | 75 | – | – | – | – | 75 |
| (United States) | Phil Mickelson | 921 | 45 | 78^{†} | 57 | T45 | 56 | WD | 68 | – | – | 68 |
| (United States) | Will MacKenzie | 920 | 46 | CUT | 59 | T45 | 58 | T59 | 65 | – | – | 65 |
| (United States) | Brian Stuard | 891 | 47 | T74^{†} | 64 | T16 | 49 | T36 | 51 | – | – | 51 |
| (Scotland) | Russell Knox* | 885 | 48 | T38 | 46 | T26 | 40 | T23 | 40 | – | – | 40 |
| (United States) | Daniel Summerhays | 869 | 49 | T46 | 52 | T57 | 60 | T29 | 57 | – | – | 57 |
| (United States) | Russell Henley | 864 | 50 | T61 | 62 | T2 | 14 | T59 | 20 | 310 | 12 | 19 |
| (United States) | Chris Stroud | 834 | 51 | T19 | 41 | T45 | 42 | T43 | 47 | – | – | 47 |
| (Australia) | Steven Bowditch | 828 | 52 | T22 | 44 | T45 | 45 | T63 | 59 | – | – | 59 |
| (United States) | Scott Brown | 816 | 53 | CUT | 70 | 77^{†} | 85 | – | – | – | – | 85 |
| (South Korea) | K. J. Choi | 814 | 54 | T71^{†} | 69 | T35 | 65 | T63 | 69 | – | – | 69 |
| (United States) | Brandt Snedeker | 812 | 55 | CUT | 71 | CUT | 86 | – | – | – | – | 86 |
| (Argentina) | Ángel Cabrera | 807 | 56 | T22 | 45 | CUT | 59 | T12 | 50 | – | – | 50 |
| (United States) | Jason Dufner | 798 | 57 | DNP | 74 | DNP | 90 | – | – | – | – | 90 |
| (United States) | Ben Martin* | 789 | 58 | T46 | 63 | CUT | 76 | – | – | – | – | 76 |
| (United States) | Jason Bohn | 784 | 59 | T61 | 68 | T35 | 64 | 66 | 70 | – | – | 70 |
| (South Africa) | Charl Schwartzel | 783 | 60 | T30 | 53 | T43 | 52 | T12 | 43 | – | – | 43 |
| (United States) | Cameron Tringale | 781 | 61 | T2 | 10 | T69 | 18 | T31 | 19 | 320 | 15 | 20 |
| (United States) | Hunter Mahan | 776 | 62 | 1 | 1 | 64 | 3 | T59 | 5 | 1,600 | T23 | 6 |
| (United States) | Ben Crane | 774 | 63 | CUT | 78 | T29 | 69 | T23 | 60 | – | – | 60 |
| (United States) | Jerry Kelly | 765 | 64 | T38 | 60 | T57 | 70 | T29 | 62 | – | – | 62 |
| (United States) | Erik Compton | 745 | 65 | T19 | 50 | CUT | 62 | T46 | 64 | – | – | 64 |
| (England) | Luke Donald | 743 | 66 | CUT | 80 | T57 | 89 | – | – | – | – | 89 |
| (United States) | Brendan Steele | 729 | 67 | T57 | 76 | T50 | 79 | – | – | – | – | 79 |
| (United States) | Kevin Chappell | 723 | 68 | T30 | 61 | T50 | 61 | T16 | 55 | – | – | 55 |
| (United States) | Billy Horschel | 722 | 69 | CUT | 82 | T2 | 20 | 1 | 2 | 2,250 | 1 | 1 |
| (Sweden) | Henrik Stenson | 720 | 70 | T38 | 66 | T26 | 55 | T23 | 52 | – | – | 52 |
| (Zimbabwe) | Brendon de Jonge | 717 | 71 | T61 | 79 | T74^{†} | 91 | – | – | – | – | 91 |
| (United States) | Chesson Hadley* | 705 | 72 | 70 | 84 | T9 | 57 | T12 | 49 | – | – | 49 |
| (United States) | Scott Langley | 686 | 73 | T30 | 65 | T65 | 77 | – | – | – | – | 77 |
| (United States) | Pat Perez | 682 | 74 | CUT | 87 | WD | 98 | – | – | – | – | 98 |
| (Japan) | Ryo Ishikawa* | 681 | 75 | T19 | 56 | CUT | 72 | – | – | – | – | 72 |
| (United States) | Robert Garrigus | 678 | 76 | CUT | 88 | CUT | 99 | – | – | – | – | 99 |
| (United States) | Scott Stallings | 668 | 77 | CUT | 90 | T35 | 84 | – | – | – | – | 84 |
| (England) | Ian Poulter | 657 | 78 | CUT | 91 | T23 | 78 | – | – | – | – | 78 |
| (Sweden) | Carl Pettersson | 650 | 79 | CUT | 93 | T9 | 66 | T31 | 63 | – | – | 63 |
| (United States) | Andrew Svoboda* | 647 | 80 | CUT | 94 | T57 | 94 | – | – | – | – | 94 |
| (United States) | William McGirt | 646 | 81 | T5 | 35 | T69 | 50 | 65 | 61 | – | – | 61 |
| (Canada) | David Hearn | 645 | 82 | T38 | 75 | T43 | 74 | – | – | – | – | 74 |
| (United States) | Shawn Stefani* | 640 | 83 | T30 | 67 | 68 | 83 | – | – | – | – | 83 |
| (United States) | Robert Streb* | 635 | 84 | CUT | 97 | T9 | 71 | – | – | – | – | 71 |
| (United States) | Jason Kokrak | 632 | 85 | T61 | 89 | T16 | 73 | – | – | – | – | 73 |
| (United States) | Jeff Overton | 631 | 86 | T53 | 83 | T69 | 92 | – | – | – | – | 92 |
| (United States) | Billy Hurley III* | 630 | 87 | CUT | 98 | T57 | 97 | – | – | – | – | 97 |
| (Fiji) | Vijay Singh | 625 | 88 | T68 | 95 | T35 | 87 | – | – | – | – | 87 |
| (United States) | Michael Putnam | 618 | 89 | CUT | 99 | T50 | 93 | – | – | – | – | 93 |
| (Australia) | Geoff Ogilvy | 611 | 90 | CUT | 100 | T2 | 24 | T36 | 25 | 260 | 29 | 29 |
| (South Africa) | Ernie Els | 610 | 91 | T5 | 39 | T50 | 44 | T16 | 41 | – | – | 41 |
| (Sweden) | Jonas Blixt | 599 | 92 | CUT | 102 | – | – | – | – | – | – | 102 |
| (United States) | Kevin Kisner* | 587 | 93 | CUT | 104 | – | – | – | – | – | – | 104 |
| (United States) | Nick Watney | 584 | 94 | CUT | 105 | – | – | – | – | – | – | 105 |
| (United States) | Luke Guthrie | 575 | 95 | T71^{†} | 106 | – | – | – | – | – | – | 106 |
| (South Africa) | Retief Goosen | 569 | 96 | T66 | 103 | – | – | – | – | – | – | 103 |
| (South Africa) | Rory Sabbatini | 567 | 97 | CUT | 108 | – | – | – | – | – | – | 108 |
| (Australia) | Stuart Appleby | 554 | 98 | T2 | 19 | CUT | 26 | T46 | 31 | – | – | 31 |
| (United States) | John Huh | 544 | 99 | T38 | 86 | T69 | 96 | – | – | – | – | 96 |
| (England) | Brian Davis | 534 | 100 | T74^{†} | 110 | – | – | – | – | – | – | 110 |
| (United States) | Martin Flores | 530 | 101 | 79^{†} | 112 | – | – | – | – | – | – | 112 |
| (Australia) | Aaron Baddeley | 528 | 102 | CUT | 114 | – | – | – | – | – | – | 114 |
| (United States) | Steve Stricker | 519 | 103 | DNP | 116 | – | – | – | – | – | – | 116 |
| (United States) | Bo Van Pelt | 518 | 104 | T13 | 73 | T57 | 81 | – | – | – | – | 81 |
| (United States) | Ricky Barnes | 518 | 105 | T68 | 113 | – | – | – | – | – | – | 113 |
| (United States) | Michael Thompson | 515 | 106 | CUT | 117 | – | – | – | – | – | – | 117 |
| (England) | Lee Westwood | 514 | 107 | T57 | 107 | – | – | – | – | – | – | 107 |
| (Venezuela) | Jhonattan Vegas | 505 | 108 | T66 | 115 | – | – | – | – | – | – | 115 |
| (United States) | Stewart Cink | 504 | 109 | T15 | 77 | T50 | 80 | – | – | – | – | 80 |
| (Argentina) | Andrés Romero | 503 | 110 | T38 | 92 | 76^{†} | 100 | – | – | – | – | 100 |
| (United States) | Troy Merritt* | 499 | 111 | T46 | 101 | – | – | – | – | – | – | 101 |
| (United States) | David Toms | 498 | 112 | T74^{†} | 118 | – | – | – | – | – | – | 118 |
| (United States) | Boo Weekley | 496 | 113 | T61 | 111 | – | – | – | – | – | – | 111 |
| (New Zealand) | Tim Wilkinson | 494 | 114 | T71^{†} | 119 | – | – | – | – | – | – | 119 |
| (United States) | Justin Leonard | 491 | 115 | CUT | 120 | – | – | – | – | – | – | 120 |
| (New Zealand) | Danny Lee* | 490 | 116 | T38 | 96 | T35 | 88 | – | – | – | – | 88 |
| (United States) | Brice Garnett* | 488 | 117 | CUT | 121 | – | – | – | – | – | – | 121 |
| (England) | Paul Casey | 471 | 118 | T22 | 85 | DNP | 95 | – | – | – | – | 95 |
| (Spain) | Gonzalo Fernández-Castaño* | 470 | 119 | T15 | 81 | T45 | 82 | – | – | – | – | 82 |
| (South Korea) | Bae Sang-moon | 466 | 120 | CUT | 122 | – | – | – | – | – | – | 122 |
| (United States) | James Hahn | 456 | 121 | CUT | 123 | – | – | – | – | – | – | 123 |
| (United States) | Bryce Molder | 455 | 122 | T46 | 109 | – | – | – | – | – | – | 109 |
| (South Africa) | Louis Oosthuizen | 453 | 123 | CUT | 124 | – | – | – | – | – | – | 124 |
| (United States) | Morgan Hoffmann | 448 | 124 | T9 | 72 | T35 | 68 | 3 | 21 | 300 | T27 | 26 |
| (Australia) | Robert Allenby | 438 | 125 | CUT | 125 | – | – | – | – | – | – | 125 |

* First-time Playoffs participant
^{†} MDF – made cut, did not finish (i.e. cut after third round)
