= Moonah Classic =

Tournament information
- Location: Fingal, Victoria, Australia
- Established: 2008
- Course: Moonah Links
- Par: 72
- Length: 7,416 yards (6,781 m)
- Tours: PGA Tour of Australasia; Nationwide Tour
- Format: Stroke play
- Prize fund: US$700,000
- Month played: February
- Final year: 2010

Tournament record score
- Aggregate: 275 Ewan Porter (2008)
- To par: −13 as above

Final champion
- (United States) Jim Herman
- Location in Australia Location in Victoria

The Moonah Classic was a golf tournament co-sanctioned by the PGA Tour of Australasia and the Nationwide Tour. It was played for the first time from 21 to 24 February 2008 at Moonah Links on the Mornington Peninsula, Victoria, Australia. The 2010 purse was US$700,000.

The tournament replaced the Jacob's Creek Open Championship.

== Winners ==
Year	Tours (Note: ANZ − PGA Tour of Australasia; NWT − Nationwide Tour.)	Winner	Score	To par	Margin of victory	Runner(s)-up
2010	ANZ, NWT	(United States) Jim Herman	277	−11	Playoff	(United States) Chris Kirk
2009	ANZ, NWT	(Australia) Alistair Presnell	279	−9	1 stroke	(Australia) Peter O'Malley
2008	ANZ, NWT	(Australia) Ewan Porter	275	−13	7 strokes	(United States) D. J. Brigman (United States) Tee McCabe

Bolded golfers graduated to the PGA Tour at the end of the Nationwide Tour season.
