= Ewan Porter =

Australian professional golfer (born 1982)

Personal information
- Nationality: Australia
- Born: 4 July 1982 (age 44) Sydney, Australia
- Height: 1.83 m (6 ft 0 in)
- Weight: 78 kg (172 lb; 12.3 st)
- Spouse: Emily Porter
- Children: 3

Career
- Sport: Golf
- Turned professional: 2001
- Former tours: PGA Tour of Australasia; Web.com Tour; Asian Tour
- Professional wins: 2

Number of wins by tour
- PGA Tour of Australasia: 1
- Korn Ferry Tour: 2

Best results in major championships
- Masters Tournament: DNP
- PGA Championship: DNP
- U.S. Open: DNP
- The Open Championship: CUT: 2007, 2008, 2010

Ewan Porter (born 4 July 1982) is an Australian former professional golfer who played on the PGA Tour of Australasia, Asian Tour and the Nationwide Tour.

== Career ==
Porter was born in Sydney. He turned professional in 2001 and played on the PGA Tour of Australasia. He played on the Asian Tour in 2004. He played on the Nationwide Tour from 2005 to 2013. He has two wins, the 2008 Moonah Classic and the 2010 South Georgia Classic.

He now serves as a commentator for the DP World Tour, PGA Tour Live and the LPGA Tour.

== Amateur wins ==
- 1998 Australian Schoolboys
- 1999 NSW Junior Championship
- 2000 NSW Junior Championship
- 2001 New South Wales Medal, City of Sydney Amateur

== Professional wins (2) ==
=== PGA Tour of Australasia wins (1) ===
No.	Date	Tournament	Winning score	Margin of victory	Runners-up
1	24 Feb 2008	Moonah Classic^{1}	−13 (67-71-71-66=275)	6 strokes	(United States) D. J. Brigman, (United States) Tee McCabe

^{1}Co-sanctioned by the Nationwide Tour

=== Nationwide Tour wins (2) ===
No.	Date	Tournament	Winning score	Margin of victory	Runner(s)-up
1	24 Feb 2008	Moonah Classic^{1}	−13 (67-71-71-66=275)	6 strokes	(United States) D. J. Brigman, (United States) Tee McCabe
2	25 Apr 2010	South Georgia Classic	−11 (67-71-69-70=277)	1 stroke	(Venezuela) Jhonattan Vegas

^{1}Co-sanctioned by the PGA Tour of Australasia

== Results in major championships ==
Tournament	2007	2008	2009	2010
The Open Championship	CUT	CUT		CUT

Note: Porter only played in The Open Championship.

Did not play

CUT = missed the half-way cut

== Team appearances ==
Amateur

- Australian Men's Interstate Teams Matches (representing New South Wales): 2001
