= Alistair Presnell =

Australian professional golfer

Personal information
- Full name: Alistair Presnell
- Nationality: Australia
- Born: 26 March 1979 (age 47) Melbourne, Australia
- Height: 6 ft 3 in (1.91 m)
- Weight: 210 lb (95 kg; 15 st)

Career
- Sport: Golf
- Turned professional: 2004
- Current tours: Web.com Tour; PGA Tour of Australasia
- Former tours: PGA Tour; Asian Tour (2004–06)
- Professional wins: 2

Number of wins by tour
- PGA Tour of Australasia: 2
- Korn Ferry Tour: 1

Best results in major championships
- Masters Tournament: DNP
- PGA Championship: DNP
- U.S. Open: T29: 2012
- The Open Championship: DNP

Alistair Presnell (born 26 March 1979) is an Australian professional golfer.

== Career ==
In 1979, Presnell was born in Melbourne, Victoria. Having won three amateur titles during 2003, he turned professional at the start of 2004 and joined both the PGA Tour of Australasia and Asian Tour.

Presnell finished tied for 5th at the 2004 Australian Open during his rookie season to secure his place on the Australasian Tour, and only just retained his Asian Tour card with 60th place on the end-of-season money list, the last place to guarantee playing rights for the following season. In 2006, he lost his place on both tours, but managed to regain his PGA Tour of Australasia playing status though qualifying school.

Presnell won his first professional title at the 2009 PGA Tour of Australasia's Moonah Classic, which was co-sanctioned by the United States–based second tier Nationwide Tour. The win gave him exemption on both tours until the end of 2010.

By virtue of his second-place finish on the 2009 PGA Tour of Australasia's Order of Merit, he gained an exemption into the 2010 WGC-CA Championship. In not only his first World Golf Championship event, but also his first PGA Tour event, he placed a respectable tied for 6th on 10-under-par, which included a final round 8-under-par 64.

In 2010, Presnell won the Victorian PGA Championship, thanks to a final round score of 60. In doing so, he equalled the lowest score in Australasian PGA Tour history.

Presnell played in his first major at the 2012 U.S. Open. His place in the field was secured through sectional qualifying. His major debut saw him tied for second at one point on Friday afternoon. He finished the tournament at +9, tied for 29th.

== Amateur wins ==
- 2003 Victorian Amateur Medal, Dunes Medal, ACT Amateur

== Professional wins (2) ==
=== PGA Tour of Australasia wins (2) ===
No.	Date	Tournament	Winning score	Margin of victory	Runner(s)-up
1	1 Mar 2009	Moonah Classic^{1}	−9 (72-67-72-68=279)	1 stroke	(Australia) Peter O'Malley
2	14 Feb 2010	Cellarbrations Victorian PGA Championship	−22 (71-65-70-60=266)	1 stroke	(Australia) Kurt Barnes, (Australia) David Bransdon

^{1}Co-sanctioned by the Nationwide Tour

=== Nationwide Tour wins (1) ===
No.	Date	Tournament	Winning score	Margin of victory	Runner-up
1	1 Mar 2009	Moonah Classic^{1}	−9 (72-67-72-68=279)	1 stroke	(Australia) Peter O'Malley

^{1}Co-sanctioned by the PGA Tour of Australasia

== Results in major championships ==
Tournament	2012	2013
U.S. Open	T29	T67

"T" indicates a tie for a place
Note: Presnell only played in the U.S. Open.

== Results in World Golf Championships ==
Tournament	2010	2011
Match Play		
Championship	T6	
Invitational		
Champions	T63	T72

Top 10
Did not play

"T" = Tied

== Team appearances ==
Amateur

- Australian Men's Interstate Teams Matches (representing Victoria): 2013

== See also ==
- 2012 Web.com Tour graduates
