= 2010 PGA Tour of Australasia =

Golf tour season

2010 PGA Tour of Australasia season
- Duration: 7 January 2010 – 13 December 2010
- Number of official events: 12
- Order of Merit: (Australia) Geoff Ogilvy

The 2010 PGA Tour of Australasia was the 37th season on the PGA Tour of Australasia, the main professional golf tour in Australia and New Zealand since it was formed in 1973.

== Schedule ==
The following table lists official events during the 2010 season.

| Date | Tournament | Location | Purse (A$) | Winner (Note: The number in brackets after each winner's name is the number of PGA Tour of Australasia events they had won up to and including that tournament. This information is only shown for PGA Tour of Australasia members.) | OWGR points | Other tours (Note: NWT − Nationwide Tour; ONE − OneAsia Tour.) | Notes |
|---|---|---|---|---|---|---|---|
| 10 Jan | Subaru Victorian Open | Victoria | 115,000 | (Australia) Jason Norris (1) | n/a | | |
| 24 Jan | New Zealand PGA Championship | New Zealand | NZ$150,000 | (Australia) Mitchell Brown (1) | n/a | | |
| 31 Jan | Michael Hill New Zealand Open | New Zealand | US$600,000 | (United States) Bobby Gates (1) | 16 | NWT | |
| 7 Feb | Moonah Classic | Victoria | US$700,000 | (United States) Jim Herman (n/a) | 16 | NWT | |
| 14 Feb | Cellarbrations Victorian PGA Championship | Victoria | 110,000 | (Australia) Alistair Presnell (2) | n/a | | |
| 31 Oct | John Hughes Geely Nexus Risk Services WA Open | Western Australia | 110,000 | (Australia) Brad Kennedy (1) | n/a | | |
| 7 Nov | WA PGA Championship | Western Australia | 110,000 | (Australia) David Bransdon (1) | n/a | | |
| 14 Nov | JBWere Masters | Victoria | 1,500,000 | (Australia) Stuart Appleby (3) | 30 | | |
| 21 Nov | Cellarbrations NSW PGA Championship | New South Wales | 115,000 | (Australia) Steven Bowditch (3) | n/a | | |
| 28 Nov | NSW Open | New South Wales | 135,000 | (Australia) Peter O'Malley (5) | n/a | | |
| 5 Dec | Australian Open | New South Wales | 1,500,000 | (Australia) Geoff Ogilvy (2) | 32 | ONE | Flagship event |
| 13 Dec | Australian PGA Championship | Queensland | 1,500,000 | (Australia) Peter Senior (19) | 22 | ONE | |

== Order of Merit ==
The Order of Merit was based on prize money won during the season, calculated in Australian dollars.

| Position | Player | Prize money (A$) |
|---|---|---|
| 1 | (Australia) Geoff Ogilvy | 459,900 |
| 2 | (Australia) Peter Senior | 308,011 |
| 3 | (Australia) Stuart Appleby | 274,950 |
| 4 | (United States) Bobby Gates | 248,545 |
| 5 | (Australia) Alistair Presnell | 170,270 |
