= 2010 Nationwide Tour =

Golf tour season

2010 Nationwide Tour season
- Duration: January 28, 2010 – October 31, 2010
- Number of official events: 29
- Most wins: (United States) Tommy Gainey (2) (United States) Hunter Haas (2) (United States) Chris Kirk (2) (United States) Martin Piller (2)
- Money list: (United States) Jamie Lovemark
- Player of the Year: (United States) Jamie Lovemark

The 2010 Nationwide Tour was the 21st season of the Nationwide Tour, the official development tour to the PGA Tour.

== Schedule ==
The following table lists official events during the 2010 season.

Date	Tournament	Location	Purse (US$)	Winner (Note: The number in parentheses after each winner's name is the number of Nationwide Tour events they had won up to and including that tournament. This information is only shown for Nationwide Tour members. It is rare for someone to accumulate many wins on the Nationwide Tour as success at this level usually leads to promotion to the PGA Tour.)	OWGR points	Other tours (Note: ANZ − PGA Tour of Australasia.)	Notes
Jan 31	Michael Hill New Zealand Open	New Zealand	600,000	(United States) Bobby Gates (1)	16	ANZ	
Feb 7	Moonah Classic	Australia	700,000	(United States) Jim Herman (1)	16	ANZ	
Feb 28	Panama Claro Championship	Panama	550,000	(United States) Fran Quinn (4)	16		
Mar 7	Pacific Rubiales Bogotá Open	Colombia	600,000	(United States) Steve Pate (1)	14		New tournament
Mar 28	Chitimacha Louisiana Open	Louisiana	550,000	(Argentina) Fabián Gómez (1)	14		
Apr 18	Fresh Express Classic	California	600,000	(United States) Kevin Chappell (1)	14		
Apr 25	South Georgia Classic	Georgia	625,000	(Australia) Ewan Porter (2)	14		
May 2	Stadion Classic at UGA	Georgia	550,000	(United States) Martin Piller (1)	14		
May 16	BMW Charity Pro-Am	South Carolina	600,000	(United States) Justin Hicks (2)	14		Pro-Am
May 23	Rex Hospital Open	North Carolina	550,000	(United States) John Riegger (2)	14		
Jun 6	Melwood Prince George's County Open	Maryland	600,000	(United States) Tommy Gainey (1)	14		
Jun 20	Fort Smith Classic	Arkansas	525,000	(United States) Chris Kirk (1)	14		
Jun 27	Mexico Open Bicentenary	Mexico	600,000	(United States) Jamie Lovemark (1)	14		
Jul 11	Ford Wayne Gretzky Classic	Canada	800,099	(United States) Peter Tomasulo (2)	14		
Jul 18	Chiquita Classic	Ohio	550,000	(United States) Tommy Gainey (2)	14		New tournament
Jul 25	Nationwide Children's Hospital Invitational	Ohio	800,000	(United States) D. J. Brigman (2)	14		
Aug 1	Cox Classic	Nebraska	725,000	(United States) Martin Piller (2)	14		
Aug 8	Preferred Health Systems Wichita Open	Kansas	575,000	(Venezuela) Jhonattan Vegas (1)	14		
Aug 15	Price Cutter Charity Championship	Missouri	625,000	(United States) Hunter Haas (3)	14		
Aug 29	Knoxville News Sentinel Open	Tennessee	500,000	(United States) Chris Kirk (2)	14		
Sep 5	Mylan Classic	Pennsylvania	600,000	(United States) Kevin Kisner (1)	14		New tournament
Sep 12	Utah Championship	Utah	550,000	(United States) Michael Putnam (1)	14		
Sep 19	Albertsons Boise Open	Idaho	725,000	(United States) Hunter Haas (4)	14		
Sep 26	WNB Golf Classic	Texas	525,000	(United States) Nate Smith (1)	14		
Oct 3	Soboba Golf Classic	California	1,000,000	(Australia) Steven Bowditch (2)	14		
Oct 10	Chattanooga Classic	Tennessee	500,000	(Australia) Scott Gardiner (1)	14		
Oct 17	Miccosukee Championship	Florida	600,000	(United States) Jason Gore (7)	14		
Oct 24	Winn-Dixie Jacksonville Open	Florida	600,000	(United States) David Mathis (2)	14		New tournament
Oct 31	Nationwide Tour Championship	South Carolina	1,000,000	(United States) Brendan Steele (1)	20		Tour Championship

== Money list ==
The money list was based on prize money won during the season, calculated in U.S. dollars. The top 25 players on the money list earned status to play on the 2011 PGA Tour.

Position	Player	Prize money ($)
1	(United States) Jamie Lovemark	452,951
2	(United States) Chris Kirk	411,206
3	(United States) Hunter Haas	408,047
4	(United States) Tommy Gainey	403,957
5	(United States) Daniel Summerhays	391,742

== Awards ==
Award	Winner	Ref.
Player of the Year (Jack Nicklaus Trophy)	(United States) Jamie Lovemark	
