= Hunter Haas =

American golfer (born 1976)

Personal information
- Nationality: United States
- Born: December 1, 1976 (age 49) Fort Worth, Texas, U.S.
- Height: 5 ft 10 in (1.78 m)
- Weight: 170 lb (77 kg; 12 st)

Career
- Sport: Golf
- College: University of Oklahoma
- Turned professional: 2000
- Current tour: Web.com Tour
- Former tour: PGA Tour
- Professional wins: 4

Number of wins by tour
- Korn Ferry Tour: 4

Best results in major championships
- Masters Tournament: CUT: 2000
- PGA Championship: DNP
- U.S. Open: CUT: 2008, 2012
- The Open Championship: DNP

Hunter Haas (born December 1, 1976) is an American professional golfer.

== Career ==
Haas was born in Fort Worth, Texas. He won the 1999 U.S. Amateur Public Links. He graduated from the University of Oklahoma in 2000 and turned professional.

Haas is currently a member of the Web.com Tour. Haas was a member of the PGA Tour in 2001, 2005, 2011–2012; and a member of the Nationwide Tour in 2002–2004, 2006–2010, and 2013–2014. He earned his PGA Tour card for 2001 through PGA Tour Qualifying School in his first attempt. In 2001, Haas only made 8 of 30 cuts on Tour, and as a result, he was relegated to the Nationwide Tour for 2002. Haas did not get back to the main tour until 2005, when he finished in 16th on the money list for the 2004 Nationwide Tour season. On the PGA Tour in 2005, Haas fared better than he did in his rookie season but not well enough to retain his tour card. He made 14 of 28 cuts in 2005 including one top-10. Haas returned to PGA Tour Qualifying Tournament in 2007 and finished in a tie for 85th place – not good enough to earn a tour card.

Haas narrowly missed qualifying for the PGA Tour in 2008 by placing 27th on the Nationwide Tour money list, two spots away from a PGA Tour card for 2009. He also had an opportunity at Q-school when he started the final round in 27th place, but shot 71 and finished in 40th.

Haas has won four times on the Nationwide Tour, once each in 2004 and 2006, and twice in 2010. Haas finished third on the 2010 Nationwide Tour money list, which earned him a return trip to the PGA Tour in 2011.

== Amateur wins ==
- 1998 Big 12 Conference Championship
- 1999 U.S. Amateur Public Links, Porter Cup, Dixie Amateur

== Professional wins (4) ==
=== Nationwide Tour wins (4) ===
No.	Date	Tournament	Winning score	Margin of victory	Runner(s)-up
1	Jun 6, 2004	Knoxville Open	−13 (71-67-68-69=275)	Playoff	(United States) Shane Bertsch, (United States) Justin Bolli
2	Jun 18, 2006	Knoxville Open (2)	−19 (67-66-67-69=269)	5 strokes	(England) Gary Christian, (United States) Parker McLachlin
3	Aug 15, 2010	Price Cutter Charity Championship	−26 (65-66-66-65=262)	6 strokes	(Sweden) Jonas Blixt, (United States) Jamie Lovemark, (United States) Jason Schultz
4	Sep 19, 2010	Albertsons Boise Open	−21 (68-64-67-64=263)	1 stroke	(United States) Daniel Summerhays

Nationwide Tour playoff record (1–1)

No.	Year	Tournament	Opponents	Result
1	2004	Knoxville Open	(United States) Shane Bertsch, (United States) Justin Bolli	Won with birdie on first extra hole
2	2004	Preferred Health Systems Wichita Open	(United States) Erik Compton, (United States) Scott Harrington, (Australia) Bradley Hughes	Hughes won with birdie on first extra hole

== Results in major championships ==
Tournament	2000	2001	2002	2003	2004	2005	2006	2007	2008	2009	2010	2011	2012
Masters Tournament	CUT												
U.S. Open									CUT				CUT

Note: Haas never played in The Open Championship nor the PGA Championship.

Did not play
- CUT = missed the half-way cut

== U.S. national team appearances ==
Amateur

- Walker Cup: 1999

== See also ==
- 2000 PGA Tour Qualifying School graduates
- 2004 Nationwide Tour graduates
- 2010 Nationwide Tour graduates
- List of golfers with most Web.com Tour wins
