= 2008 PGA Tour of Australasia =

Golf tour season

2008 PGA Tour of Australasia season
- Duration: 14 February 2008 – 14 December 2008
- Number of official events: 6
- Order of Merit: (New Zealand) Mark Brown

The 2008 PGA Tour of Australasia was the 36th season on the PGA Tour of Australasia, the main professional golf tour in Australia and New Zealand since it was formed in 1973.

== Schedule ==
The following table lists official events during the 2008 season.

Date	Tournament	Location	Purse (A$)	Winner (Note: The number in brackets after each winner's name is the number of PGA Tour of Australasia events they had won up to and including that tournament. This information is only shown for PGA Tour of Australasia members.)	OWGR points	Other tours (Note: AFR − Sunshine Tour; ASA − Asian Tour; EUR − European Tour; NWT − Nationwide Tour.)	Notes
17 Feb	HSBC New Zealand PGA Championship	New Zealand	US$650,000	(United States) Darron Stiles (1)	12	NWT	
24 Feb	Moonah Classic	Victoria	US$750,000	(Australia) Ewan Porter (1)	16	NWT	New tournament
2 Mar	Johnnie Walker Classic	India	£1,250,000	(New Zealand) Mark Brown (1)	38	ASA, EUR	
30 Nov	Sportsbet Australian Masters	Victoria	1,500,000	(Australia) Rod Pampling (2)	22	EUR	
7 Dec	Cadbury Schweppes Australian PGA Championship	Queensland	1,500,000	(Australia) Geoff Ogilvy (1)	26		
14 Dec	Australian Open	New South Wales	1,500,000	(South Africa) Tim Clark (n/a)	32		Flagship event

=== Unofficial events ===
The following events were sanctioned by the PGA Tour of Australasia, but did not carry official money, nor were wins official.

Date	Tournament	Location	Purse (A$)	Winner	OWGR points	Other tours	Notes
9 Nov	HSBC Champions	China	US$5,000,000	(Spain) Sergio García	52	AFR, (Note: Sunshine Tour unofficial event) ASA, (Note: Asian Tour unofficial event) EUR	Limited-field event

== Order of Merit ==
The Order of Merit was based on prize money won during the season, calculated in Australian dollars.

Position	Player	Prize money (A$)
1	(New Zealand) Mark Brown	440,027
2	(Australia) Rod Pampling	368,300
3	(Australia) Geoff Ogilvy	316,500
4	(Australia) Scott Strange	268,644
5	(Australia) Greg Chalmers	204,039

== Von Nida Tour ==
2008 Von Nida Tour season
- Duration: 31 January 2008 – 16 November 2008
- Number of official events: 5 (Note: A further three tournaments were scheduled but were either cancelled or otherwise removed from the schedule.)
- Order of Merit: (New Zealand) Michael Long

The 2008 Von Nida Tour was the sixth and final season of the Von Nida Tour, the official development tour to the PGA Tour of Australasia between 2003 and 2008.

In October, it was announced that the Von Nida Tour events would be absorbed into the main tour from the start of 2009.

=== Schedule ===
The following table lists official events during the 2008 season.

Date	Tournament	Location	Purse (A$)	Winner (Note: The number in brackets after each winner's name is the number of Von Nida Tour events they had won up to and including that tournament. It is rare for someone to accumulate many wins on the Von Nida Tour as success at this level usually leads to promotion to the PGA Tour of Australasia.)	Ref.
3 Feb	NAB Victorian PGA Championship	Victoria	110,000	(Australia) Marc Leishman (4)	
27 Apr	OG Roberts South Australian PGA Championship	South Australia	110,000	(Australia) Heath Reed (1)	
~~12 Oct~~	QLD PGA Championship	Queensland	–	Removed	
~~19 Oct~~	Queensland Open	Queensland	–	Cancelled	
~~26 Oct~~	WA Open	Western Australia	–	Removed	
2 Nov	Oceanique WA PGA Championship	Western Australia	110,000	(New Zealand) Michael Long (1)	
9 Nov	Cellarbrations NSW PGA Championship	New South Wales	100,000	(Australia) Tim Wood (2)	
16 Nov	NSW Open	New South Wales	125,000	(Australia) Aaron Townsend (1)	

=== Order of Merit ===
The Order of Merit was based on prize money won during the season, calculated in Australian dollars. The top 10 players on the Order of Merit earned status to play on the 2009 PGA Tour of Australasia.

Position	Player	Prize money (A$)
1	(New Zealand) Michael Long	27,651
2	(Australia) Aaron Townsend	26,890
3	(Australia) Tim Wood	24,972
4	(Australia) Peter Senior	19,731
5	(Australia) Heath Reed	17,550
6	(Australia) Steven Jones	13,693
7	(Australia) Tristan Lambert	13,688
8	(Australia) Kurt Barnes	13,484
9	(Australia) Peter Wilson	12,640
10	(Australia) Ryan Hammond	10,102
