= Soboba Golf Classic =

Tournament information
- Location: San Jacinto, California
- Established: 2009
- Course: The Country Club at Soboba Springs
- Par: 71
- Length: 7,101 yards (6,493 m)
- Tour: Web.com Tour
- Format: Stroke play
- Prize fund: US$750,000
- Month played: April
- Final year: 2012

Tournament record score
- Aggregate: 265 Steven Bowditch (2010)
- To par: −19 as above

Final champion
- (United States) Andres Gonzales
- Location in the United States Location in California

The Soboba Golf Classic was a golf tournament on the Web.com Tour. It was played at The Country Club at Soboba Springs, owned by the Soboba Band of Luiseno Indians, in San Jacinto, California. It was first played in 2009.

The purse in 2012 was $750,000 with $135,000 going to the winner.

== Winners ==
Year	Winner	Score	To par	Margin of victory	Runner(s)-up
Soboba Golf Classic
2012	(United States) Andres Gonzales	276	−8	2 strokes	(United States) Andrew Svoboda
2011	(United States) Ted Potter Jr.	270	−14	Playoff	(Argentina) Miguel Ángel Carballo (United States) Andres Gonzales
2010	(Australia) Steven Bowditch	265	−19	3 strokes	(United States) Daniel Summerhays
Soboba Classic
2009	(United States) Jerod Turner	269	−15	2 strokes	(United States) Derek Lamely
