= Chris Kirk =

American professional golfer (born 1985)

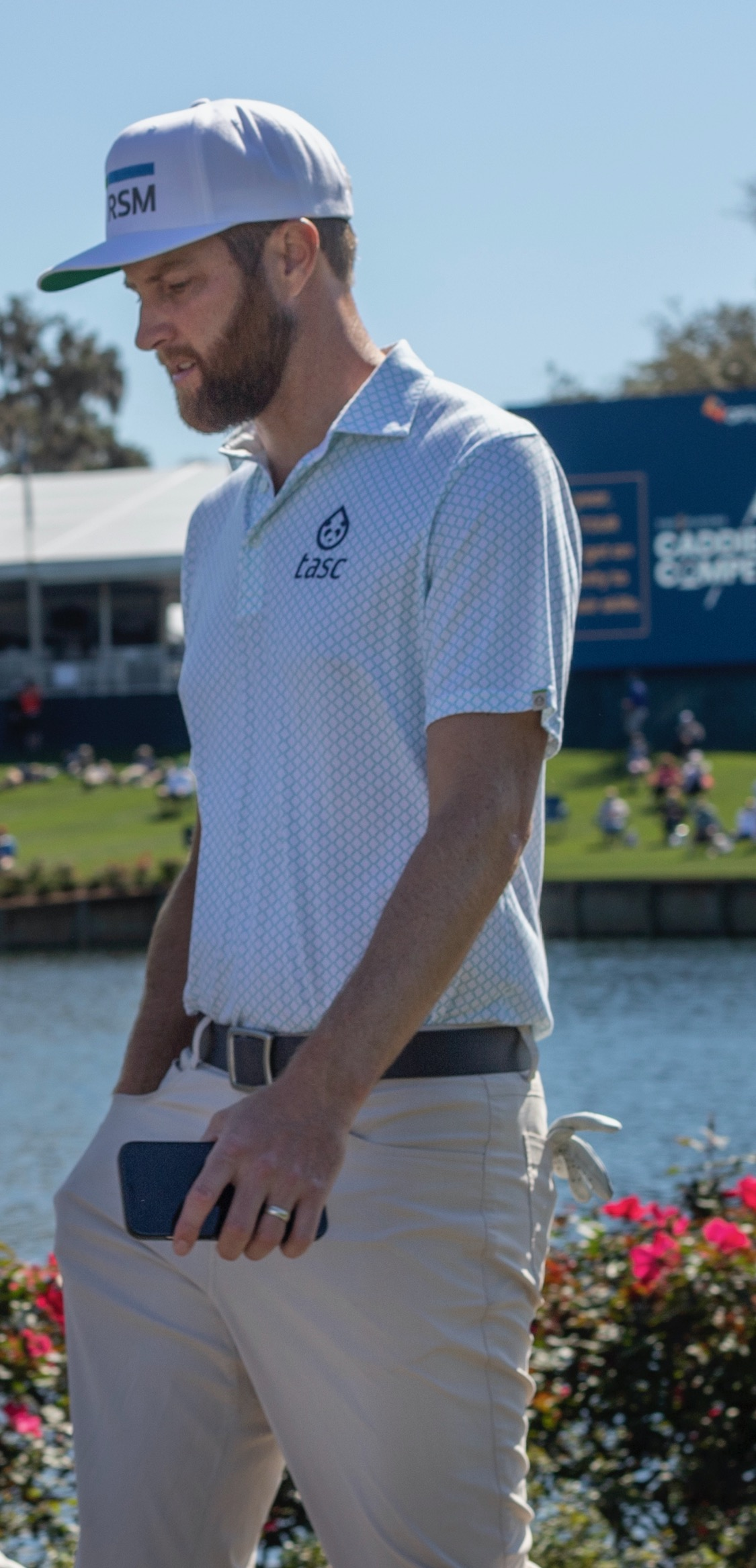
- Kirk at TPC Sawgrass in 2021

Personal information
- Full name: Christopher Brandon Kirk
- Nickname: Captain Kirk
- Nationality: United States
- Born: May 8, 1985 (age 41) Knoxville, Tennessee, U.S.
- Height: 6 ft 3 in (1.91 m)
- Weight: 175 lb (79 kg; 12.5 st)
- Spouse: Tahnee

Career
- Sport: Golf
- College: University of Georgia
- Turned professional: 2007
- Current tour: PGA Tour
- Former tour: Korn Ferry Tour
- Professional wins: 9
- Highest ranking: 16 (May 31, 2015)

Number of wins by tour
- PGA Tour: 6
- Korn Ferry Tour: 3

Best results in major championships
- Masters Tournament: T16: 2024
- PGA Championship: T5: 2022
- U.S. Open: T12: 2025
- The Open Championship: T19: 2014

Achievements and awards
- Ben Hogan Award: 2007
- PGA Tour Courage Award: 2022–23

Christopher Brandon Kirk (born May 8, 1985) is an American professional golfer who plays on the PGA Tour. He won four tournaments on the PGA Tour between 2011 and 2015, again in 2023 after an almost eight-year drought, and again in 2024. He finished second in the 2014 FedEx Cup Playoffs and reached a career-high of 16 in the world rankings during 2015.

== Early life ==
Born in Knoxville, Tennessee, Kirk was raised in Woodstock, Georgia and attended Etowah High School. He played college golf at the University of Georgia in Athens and was a member of their 2005 NCAA championship team. He represented the United States in the 2006 Eisenhower Trophy, where he had the joint second-lowest individual score, and in the 2007 Walker Cup. He was the Ben Hogan Award winner as a senior in 2007.

== Professional career ==
=== Nationwide Tour ===
Kirk turned professional immediately after the 2007 Walker Cup. He played on the Nationwide Tour for three seasons from 2008 through 2010. He was runner-up in the 2008 Knoxville Open, losing in a playoff to Jarrod Lyle. Kirk had a very successful season in 2010. Early in the season he lost to Jim Herman in a playoff for the Moonah Classic and was a runner-up in the BMW Charity Pro-Am. In June he won the Fort Smith Classic, his first Nationwide Tour title, and followed this up with his second win at the Knoxville News Sentinel Open in August. Kirk finished the season second on the Nationwide Tour money list to earn his 2011 PGA Tour card, despite missing the end of the season with a wrist injury.

=== PGA Tour ===
As a PGA Tour rookie, Kirk finished joint second to Phil Mickelson at the Shell Houston Open in April 2011. Later that year, Kirk won his first tour event, the Viking Classic, an alternate event played the same weekend as The Open Championship. He finished a stroke ahead of runners-up George McNeill and Tom Pernice Jr., and the victory automatically qualified him for the PGA Championship, where he finished in a tie for 34th place. In his debut season on the PGA Tour, Kirk had four top-10s and finished 42nd in the end of season FedEx Cup standings to retain his card for 2012.

In 2012, Kirk played in 27 events and only missed six cuts, including four top-10 finishes and best of T-4 at the RBC Canadian Open. He had a similarly very solid season in 2013, missing only four cuts, with three top-10 finishes. He finished runner-up at the AT&T Pebble Beach National Pro-Am, after shooting 64-66 on the weekend to finish two shots behind Brandt Snedeker.

Kirk earned his second PGA Tour win at the McGladrey Classic in November 2013, which was part of the new wrap-around season for 2014. He prevailed by one stroke over Briny Baird and Tim Clark. The win qualified Kirk for his first Masters; the Viking Classic, which was Kirk's first victory on tour, was an alternate event and did not include a Masters invitation. 2014, Kirk won the second event of the 2014 FedEx Cup Playoffs at the Deutsche Bank Championship in Boston for his third PGA Tour title, and jumped from 17th in FedEx Cup rankings to first. He finished tied for fourth in The Tour Championship, the first time he had qualified for the event, to end the season second on the FedEx Cup standings behind Billy Horschel, winning three million dollars. Kirk missed out on selection for the 2014 Ryder Cup. He finished 14th in the Ryder Cup points list to miss out on automatic selection. The three captain's picks were announced by Tom Watson immediately after Kirk's win in the Deutsche Bank Championship. The picks did not include Kirk or Billy Horschel, who had finished joint runner-up, leading to some criticism of both the selections and the selection process.

In 2015, Kirk won for the fourth time on the PGA Tour at the Crowne Plaza Invitational at Colonial. He shot 65-66 over the weekend to finish one stroke ahead of runners-up Jason Bohn, Brandt Snedeker and Jordan Spieth. Kirk holed a six-foot (1.8 m) putt for par on the final green to claim the victory. He reached a career-high of 16th in the world rankings after this win. Soon after this win Kirk broke his hand but returned for the FedEx Cup Playoffs. Kirk was in an automatic place for the 2015 Presidents Cup. He lost his two four fourball matches but won in the singles.

Kirk reached the quarter-finals of the 2016 WGC-Dell Match Play before losing to Rory McIlroy. In October 2016 Kirk was a joint runner-up in the Sanderson Farms Championship, an alternate event played opposite the WGC-HSBC Champions tournament. The 2017 season was his worst on the PGA Tour since joining in 2011, finishing 92nd in the FedEx Cup. Despite having only 4 top-10 finishes, 2018 was a better season for Kirk. He only missed the cut in 5 of his 29 starts and finished 66th in the FedEx Cup.

In February 2023, Kirk won The Honda Classic in a playoff over Eric Cole.

In January 2024, Kirk won his sixth PGA Tour Title at The Sentry.

== Personal life ==
On May 7, 2019, Kirk announced that he was to take an "indefinite leave" from golf to deal with his alcohol and depression issues. He returned to the PGA Tour in November 2019.

== Professional wins (9) ==
=== PGA Tour wins (6) ===
Legend
FedEx Cup playoff events (1)
Signature events (1)
Other PGA Tour (4)

No.	Date	Tournament	Winning score	To par	Margin of victory	Runner(s)-up
1	Jul 17, 2011	Viking Classic	67-67-64-68=266	−22	1 stroke	(United States) George McNeill, (United States) Tom Pernice Jr.
2	Nov 10, 2013	McGladrey Classic	66-66-68-66=266	−14	1 stroke	(United States) Briny Baird, (South Africa) Tim Clark
3	Sep 1, 2014	Deutsche Bank Championship	73-66-64-66=269	−15	2 strokes	(United States) Russell Henley, (United States) Billy Horschel, (Australia) Geoff Ogilvy
4	May 24, 2015	Crowne Plaza Invitational at Colonial	68-69-65-66=268	−12	1 stroke	(United States) Jason Bohn, (United States) Brandt Snedeker, (United States) Jordan Spieth
5	Feb 26, 2023	The Honda Classic	69-62-66-69=266	−14	Playoff	(United States) Eric Cole
6	Jan 7, 2024	The Sentry	67-65-66-65=263	−29	1 stroke	(United States) Sahith Theegala

PGA Tour playoff record (1–1)

No.	Year	Tournament	Opponent(s)	Result
1	2023	The Honda Classic	(United States) Eric Cole	Won with birdie on first extra hole
2	2025	Rocket Classic	(United States) Max Greyserman, (South Africa) Aldrich Potgieter	Potgieter won with birdie on fifth extra hole Kirk eliminated by par on second hole

=== Korn Ferry Tour wins (3) ===
No.	Date	Tournament	Winning score	To par	Margin of victory	Runner-up
1	Jul 20, 2010	Fort Smith Classic	65-69-66-64=264	−16	1 stroke	(United States) Kyle Thompson
2	Aug 29, 2010	Knoxville News Sentinel Open	68-70-63-67=268	−20	2 strokes	(United States) Travis Bertoni
3	Jun 20, 2020	King & Bear Classic	66-65-64-67=262	−26	1 stroke	(United States) Justin Lower

Korn Ferry Tour playoff record (0–2)

No.	Year	Tournament	Opponent	Result
1	2008	Knoxville Open	(Australia) Jarrod Lyle	Lost to birdie on first extra hole
2	2010	Moonah Classic	(United States) Jim Herman	Lost to birdie on first extra hole

== Results in major championships ==
Results not in chronological order in 2020.

Tournament	2008	2009
Masters Tournament		
U.S. Open	T78	CUT
The Open Championship		
PGA Championship		

Tournament	2010	2011	2012	2013	2014	2015	2016	2017	2018
Masters Tournament					T20	T33	CUT		
U.S. Open					T28	75	CUT		
The Open Championship					T19		CUT		
PGA Championship		T34		T57	CUT		CUT	CUT	T31

Tournament	2019	2020	2021	2022	2023	2024	2025	2026
Masters Tournament					T23	T16	CUT	
PGA Championship			CUT	T5	T29	CUT	T55	T44
U.S. Open					CUT	T26	T12	CUT
The Open Championship		NT	CUT	T42	CUT	T31	CUT	

Top 10
Did not play

CUT = missed the half-way cut
"T" indicates a tie for a place
NT = no tournament due to COVID-19 pandemic

=== Summary ===
Tournament	Wins	2nd	3rd	Top-5	Top-10	Top-25	Events	Cuts made
Masters Tournament	0	0	0	0	0	3	6	4
PGA Championship	0	0	0	1	1	1	12	7
U.S. Open	0	0	0	0	0	1	9	5
The Open Championship	0	0	0	0	0	1	7	3
Totals	0	0	0	1	1	6	34	19

- Most consecutive cuts made – 5 (2011 PGA – 2014 Open)
- Longest streak of top-10s – 1 (once)

== Results in The Players Championship ==
Tournament	2011	2012	2013	2014	2015	2016	2017	2018	2019
The Players Championship	CUT	T51	T55	T13	T13	WD	T12	T46	T56

Tournament	2020	2021	2022	2023	2024	2025	2026
The Players Championship	C	T48	CUT	CUT	T26	T42	T27

CUT = missed the halfway cut
WD = withdrew
"T" indicates a tie for a place
C = canceled after the first round due to the COVID-19 pandemic

== Results in World Golf Championships ==
Results not in chronological before 2015.

Tournament	2014	2015	2016	2017	2018	2019	2020	2021	2022	2023
Championship	T40	T56								
Match Play	R64	T17	QF				NT^{1}			T52
Invitational	T41		T21							
Champions	T14	T76					NT^{1}	NT^{1}	NT^{1}	

^{1}Cancelled due to COVID-19 pandemic

Top 10
Did not play

QF, R16, R32, R64 = Round in which player lost in match play
"T" = Tied
NT = No tournament
Note that the Championship and Invitational were discontinued from 2022. The Champions was discontinued from 2023.

== U.S. national team appearances ==
Amateur

- Eisenhower Trophy: 2006
- Palmer Cup: 2006, 2007 (winners)
- Walker Cup: 2007 (winners)

Professional

- Presidents Cup: 2015 (winners)

== See also ==
- 2010 Nationwide Tour graduates
