= Steven Bowditch =

Australian professional golfer (born 1983)

Personal information
- Full name: Steven David Bowditch
- Nationality: Australia
- Born: 8 June 1983 (age 43) Newcastle, New South Wales, Australia
- Height: 6 ft 0 in (1.83 m)
- Weight: 200 lb (91 kg; 14 st)

Career
- Sport: Golf
- Turned professional: 2001
- Current tours: PGA Tour; PGA Tour of Australasia; Korn Ferry Tour
- Former tour: Challenge Tour
- Professional wins: 7
- Highest ranking: 54 (30 August 2015)

Number of wins by tour
- PGA Tour: 2
- PGA Tour of Australasia: 3
- Korn Ferry Tour: 2
- Other: 1

Best results in major championships
- Masters Tournament: T26: 2014
- PGA Championship: CUT: 2014, 2015
- U.S. Open: CUT: 2016
- The Open Championship: T30: 2015

Steven David Bowditch (born 8 June 1983) is an Australian professional golfer who currently plays on the PGA Tour and the PGA Tour of Australasia.

== Early life and amateur career ==
Bowditch was born in Newcastle, New South Wales. He had a distinguished amateur career, which includes medalist honours at the 2001 Australian Amateur.

== Professional career ==
Bowditch plays on the PGA Tour of Australasia and previously played on the developmental Von Nida Tour. He also plays in the United States, where he has alternated between the PGA Tour and its developmental tour for varied success. He won the 2005 Jacob's Creek Open Championship, co-sanctioned by the PGA Tour of Australasia and the Nationwide Tour, on the way to finishing fourth on the Nationwide Tour's money list. This earned Bowditch a PGA Tour card for the first time in 2006. He played in 22 events, but only made two cuts in his debut season and returned to the Nationwide Tour in 2007.

Bowditch won for the second time on the Nationwide Tour in 2010, at the Soboba Golf Classic. He finished the year 17th on the money list and earned his 2011 PGA Tour card. His second full season on the PGA Tour was a greater success, where he played in 28 events and made 15 cuts, including six top-25 finishes.

On 30 March 2014, Bowditch won his maiden title on the PGA Tour, at the Valero Texas Open. He won by a single stroke over Will MacKenzie and Daniel Summerhays, despite shooting a final four-over-par round of 76, which was the highest round shot by a winner on tour since 2004. The victory came in his 110th tour level start. The win qualified Bowditch to play in the Masters Tournament and the PGA Championship for the first time in his career.

On 31 May 2015, Bowditch won the AT&T Byron Nelson for his second PGA Tour title. He posted a score of −18 to finish four shots ahead of Charley Hoffman, Jimmy Walker and Scott Pinckney to claim a wire-to-wire victory. He became the third Australian to win the tournament in eight years, following Adam Scott in 2008 and Jason Day in 2010. The victory qualified Bowditch for the 2015 PGA Championship and the 2016 Masters Tournament. His play during the season was good enough to earn a captain's pick for the 2015 Presidents Cup and a career high world ranking of 54th.

== Personal life ==
Bowditch has long had a battle with severe depression and is a spokesman for Beyond Blue, an Australian non-profit organisation promoting awareness of depression and related mental disorders.

On 3 February 2017, Bowditch was arrested for extreme DUI in Scottsdale, Arizona.

== Professional wins (7) ==
=== PGA Tour wins (2) ===
No.	Date	Tournament	Winning score	Margin of victory	Runners-up
1	30 Mar 2014	Valero Texas Open	−8 (69-67-68-76=280)	1 stroke	(United States) Will MacKenzie, (United States) Daniel Summerhays
2	31 May 2015	AT&T Byron Nelson	−18 (62-68-65-64=259)	4 strokes	(United States) Charley Hoffman, (United States) Scott Pinckney, (United States) Jimmy Walker

=== PGA Tour of Australasia wins (3) ===
No.	Date	Tournament	Winning score	Margin of victory	Runner(s)-up
1	20 Feb 2005	Jacob's Creek Open Championship^{1}	−11 (67-67-72-71=277)	5 strokes	(United States) Ryan Armour, (Australia) Nathan Green
2	8 Nov 2009	Cellarbrations Queensland PGA Championship	−20 (64-64-63-69=260)	6 strokes	(Australia) Clint Rice
3	8 May 2010	Cellarbrations NSW PGA Championship	−17 (64-68-64-67=263)	2 strokes	(New Zealand) Gareth Paddison

^{1}Co-sanctioned by the Nationwide Tour

PGA Tour of Australasia playoff record (0–1)

No.	Year	Tournament	Opponent	Result
1	2005	ING New Zealand PGA Championship	(Australia) Peter O'Malley	Lost to birdie on first extra hole

=== Nationwide Tour wins (2) ===
No.	Date	Tournament	Winning score	Margin of victory	Runner(s)-up
1	20 Feb 2005	Jacob's Creek Open Championship^{1}	−11 (67-67-72-71=277)	5 strokes	(United States) Ryan Armour, (Australia) Nathan Green
2	3 Oct 2010	Soboba Golf Classic	−19 (70-64-63-68=265)	3 strokes	(United States) Daniel Summerhays

^{1}Co-sanctioned by the PGA Tour of Australasia

Nationwide Tour playoff record (0–1)

No.	Year	Tournament	Opponent	Result
1	2005	ING New Zealand PGA Championship	(Australia) Peter O'Malley	Lost to birdie on first extra hole

=== Von Nida Tour wins (1) ===
No.	Date	Tournament	Winning score	Margin of victory	Runners-up
1	7 Nov 2004	QLD Group Queensland Open	−18 (64-66-68=198) (Note: Shortened to 54 holes due to weather.)	5 strokes	(Australia) Richard Ball, (Australia) Brad McIntosh, (Australia) Nigel Spence

== Playoff record ==
Challenge Tour playoff record (0–1)

No.	Year	Tournament	Opponent	Result
1	2003	BA-CA Golf Open	(England) Robert Coles	Lost to birdie on first extra hole

== Results in major championships ==
Tournament	2003	2004	2005	2006	2007	2008	2009
Masters Tournament							
U.S. Open							
The Open Championship	CUT						
PGA Championship							

Tournament	2010	2011	2012	2013	2014	2015	2016
Masters Tournament					T26		CUT
U.S. Open							CUT
The Open Championship						T30	CUT
PGA Championship					CUT	CUT	

Did not play

CUT = missed the half-way cut
"T" = tied

== Results in The Players Championship ==
Tournament	2014	2015	2016
The Players Championship	T48	CUT	CUT

CUT = missed the halfway cut
"T" indicates a tie for a place

== Results in World Golf Championships ==
Results not in chronological order prior to 2015.

Tournament	2014	2015	2016
Championship			65
Match Play			
Invitational	44	T12	58
Champions		T40	

Did not play

"T" = tied

== Team appearances ==
Amateur

- Nomura Cup (representing Australia): 2001 (winners)
- Australian Men's Interstate Teams Matches (representing Queensland): 2000, 2001 (winners)

Professional

- Presidents Cup (representing the International team): 2015

== See also ==
- 2005 Nationwide Tour graduates
- 2010 Nationwide Tour graduates
- 2012 PGA Tour Qualifying School graduates
