= Brendan Steele =

American professional golfer (born 1983)

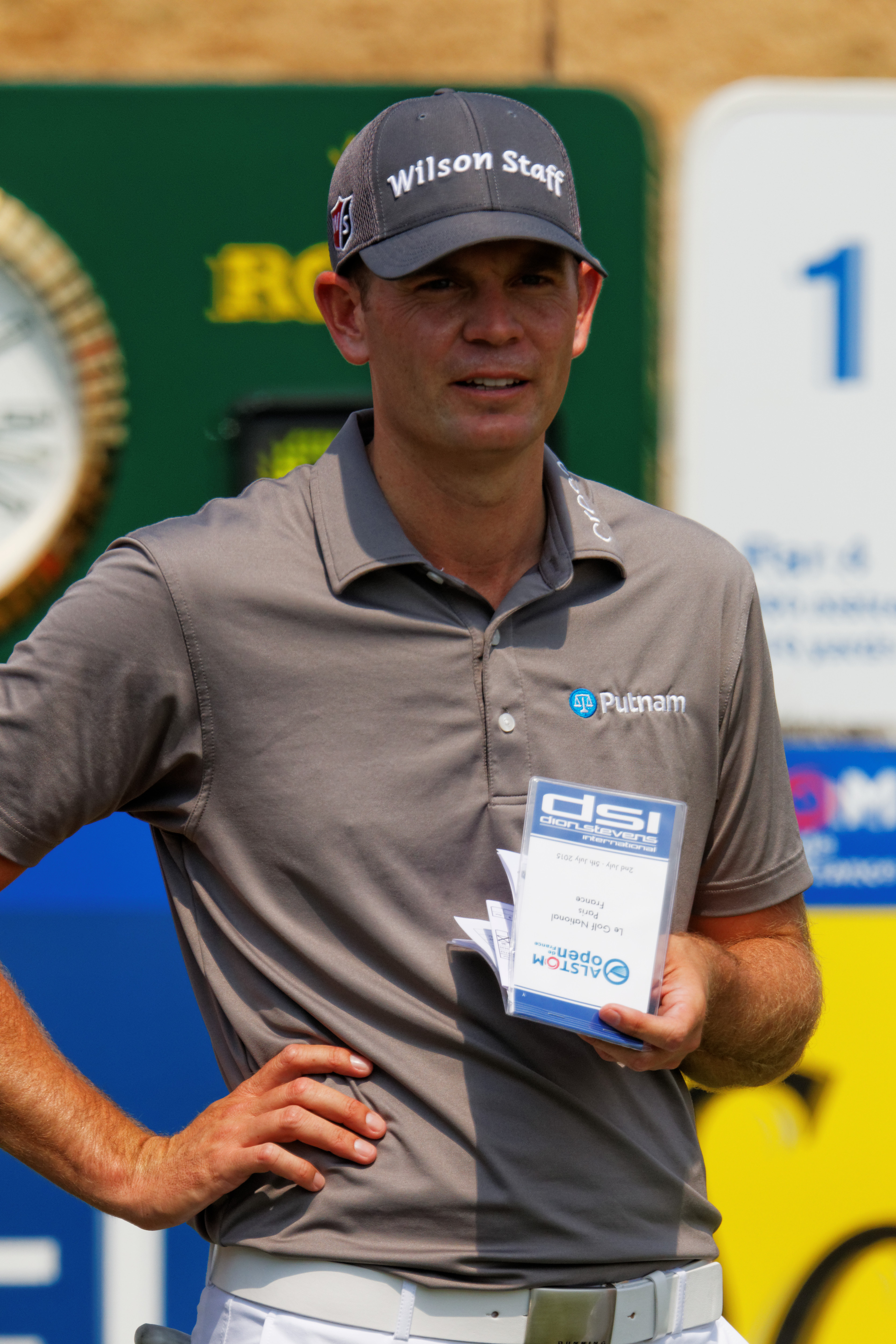
- Steele at the 2015 Alstom Open de France

Personal information
- Full name: Brendan Dean Steele
- Nationality: United States
- Born: April 5, 1983 (age 43) Idyllwild, California
- Height: 6 ft 2 in (1.88 m)
- Weight: 175 lb (79 kg; 12.5 st)
- Spouse: Anastassia

Career
- Sport: Golf
- College: UC Riverside
- Turned professional: 2005
- Current tour: LIV Golf
- Former tours: PGA Tour; Nationwide Tour; Canadian Tour
- Professional wins: 11
- Highest ranking: 35 (February 4, 2018) (as of October 25, 2026)

Number of wins by tour
- PGA Tour: 3
- Korn Ferry Tour: 1
- LIV Golf: 1
- Other: 6

Best results in major championships
- Masters Tournament: T27: 2017
- PGA Championship: T9: 2022
- U.S. Open: T13: 2017
- The Open Championship: T47: 2018

Brendan Dean Steele (born April 5, 1983) is an American professional golfer. He played predominantly on the PGA Tour, where he had three tournament victories, prior to joining LIV Golf in 2023.

== Early life and amateur career ==
In 1983, Steele was born in Idyllwild, California. He played high school golf at Hemet High school. Steele attended the University of California, Riverside, where he played on the golf team, graduating in 2005.

== Professional career ==
Steele turned professional in 2005 and played on the Golden State Tour in California, winning four times. He played on the Canadian Tour in 2006 and 2007, where his best finish was second at the 2006 Telus Edmonton Open. Steele began playing on the Nationwide Tour in 2008, and won the final event of the season in 2010, the Nationwide Tour Championship at Daniel Island. This win moved him from thirtieth to sixth on the money list and earned him a PGA Tour card for the 2011 season.

=== PGA Tour ===
On April 17, 2011, the week after the Masters, Steele notched his first PGA Tour win at the Valero Texas Open at San Antonio. He holed a seven-foot (2.1 m) par-saving putt at the final hole to finish a stroke ahead of runners-up Kevin Chappell and Charley Hoffman. Steele was the third tour rookie to win in 2011, after Jhonattan Vegas (Bob Hope Classic) and Charl Schwartzel (Masters). In addition to a $1.1 million payday and a tour card until the end of 2013, Steele's victory earned invites to The Players Championship, Bridgestone Invitational, PGA Championship, and the next year's Masters; the win moved from 115th to 19th in the FedEx Cup standings.

Over five years later on October 16, 2016, Steele won the Safeway Open in Napa, California, the first event of 2017 season. His winning score of 270 (−18) tied the tournament record for lowest score relative to par; he was one stroke ahead of runner-up Patton Kizzire for his second tour win.

Steele successfully defended his Safeway Open title on October 8, 2017. He started the final round two strokes back, but posted 69 (–3) in breezy conditions to win at 273 (−15), two strokes ahead of runner-up Tony Finau. With his third tour victory, Steele became the first with multiple wins at the event. Later that night, wildfires damaged the Silverado resort.

=== LIV Golf ===
Steele played ten tournaments on the 2022–23 PGA Tour before joining LIV Golf in February 2023, as a member of Phil Mickelson's HyFlyers GC team.

== Personal life ==
Steele is the nephew of Anthony Geary, the actor who played Luke Spencer on General Hospital.

== Professional wins (11) ==
=== PGA Tour wins (3) ===
No.	Date	Tournament	Winning score	To par	Margin of victory	Runner(s)-up
1	Apr 17, 2011	Valero Texas Open	69-72-68-71=280	−8	1 stroke	(United States) Kevin Chappell, (United States) Charley Hoffman
2	Oct 16, 2016	Safeway Open	67-71-67-65=270	−18	1 stroke	(United States) Patton Kizzire
3	Oct 8, 2017	Safeway Open (2)	65-67-72-69=273	−15	2 strokes	(United States) Tony Finau

PGA Tour playoff record (0–1)

No.	Year	Tournament	Opponent	Result
1	2020	Sony Open in Hawaii	(Australia) Cameron Smith	Lost to par on first extra hole

=== Nationwide Tour wins (1) ===
Legend
Tour Championships (1)
Other Nationwide Tour (0)

No.	Date	Tournament	Winning score	To par	Margin of victory	Runner-up
1	Oct 31, 2010	Nationwide Tour Championship	66-71-65-73=275	−13	Playoff	(United States) Colt Knost

Nationwide Tour playoff record (1–0)

No.	Year	Tournament	Opponent	Result
1	2010	Nationwide Tour Championship	(United States) Colt Knost	Won with birdie on fourth extra hole

=== LIV Golf League wins (1) ===
No.	Date	Tournament	Winning score	To par	Margin of victory	Runner-up
1	Apr 28, 2024	LIV Golf Adelaide	66-64-68=198	−18	1 stroke	(South Africa) Louis Oosthuizen

LIV Golf League playoff record (0–1)

No.	Year	Tournament	Opponents	Result
1	2023	LIV Golf Tucson	(New Zealand) Danny Lee, (South Africa) Louis Oosthuizen, (Mexico) Carlos Ortiz	Lee won with birdie on second extra hole Ortiz eliminated by par on first hole

=== Other wins (6) ===
- 2005 Four wins (Golden State Tour)
- 2011 Franklin Templeton Shootout (with Keegan Bradley), Straight Down Fall Classic (with Greg Wells)

== Results in major championships ==
Results not in chronological order in 2020.

Tournament	2011	2012	2013	2014	2015	2016	2017	2018
Masters Tournament		CUT					T27	CUT
U.S. Open			CUT			T15	T13	63
The Open Championship				CUT		CUT	CUT	T47
PGA Championship	T19			T58	T12	CUT	CUT	CUT

Tournament	2019	2020	2021	2022	2023
Masters Tournament					
PGA Championship		T22	77	T9	CUT
U.S. Open			CUT		
The Open Championship		NT	T67		

Top 10
Did not play

CUT = missed the half-way cut
"T" indicates a tie for a place
NT = No tournament due to COVID-19 pandemic

=== Summary ===
Tournament	Wins	2nd	3rd	Top-5	Top-10	Top-25	Events	Cuts made
Masters Tournament	0	0	0	0	0	0	3	1
PGA Championship	0	0	0	0	1	4	10	6
U.S. Open	0	0	0	0	0	2	5	3
The Open Championship	0	0	0	0	0	0	5	2
Totals	0	0	0	0	1	6	23	12

- Most consecutive cuts made – 3 (2014 PGA – 2016 U.S. Open)
- Longest streak of top-10s – 1 (once)

== Results in The Players Championship ==
Tournament	2011	2012	2013	2014	2015	2016	2017	2018	2019	2020	2021	2022
The Players Championship	CUT	CUT	CUT	T26	CUT	T57	T6	T79	CUT	C	T41	T13

Top 10

CUT = missed the halfway cut
"T" indicates a tie for a place
C = Canceled after the first round due to the COVID-19 pandemic

== Results in World Golf Championships ==
Results not in chronological order before 2015.

Tournament	2011	2012	2013	2014	2015	2016	2017	2018
Championship							T48	T20
Match Play							T30	T17
Invitational	T48						T24	T60
Champions								

Did not play

QF, R16, R32, R64 = Round in which player lost in match play
"T" = Tied

== See also ==
- 2010 Nationwide Tour graduates
