= 2010 Nationwide Tour graduates =

This is a list of players who graduated from the Nationwide Tour in 2010. The top 25 players on the Nationwide Tour's money list in 2010 earned their PGA Tour card for 2011.

	2010 Nationwide Tour		2011 PGA Tour				
Player	Money list rank	Earnings ($)	Starts	Cuts made	Best finish	Money list rank	Earnings
(United States) Jamie Lovemark*	1	452,951	9	2	T28	231	$34,693
(United States) Chris Kirk*	2	411,206	28	15	Win	45	$1,877,627
(United States) Hunter Haas	3	408,047	30	18	T3	89	$1,039,987
(United States) Tommy Gainey	4	403,957	34	17	3/T3 (4 times)	35	$2,174,191
(United States) Daniel Summerhays*	5	391,742	29	8	T11	171	$301,899
(United States) Brendan Steele*	6	346,258	27	16	Win	38	$1,976,310
(Venezuela) Jhonattan Vegas*	7	336,334	25	18	Win	46	$1,854,414
(United States) Martin Piller*	8	331,927	23	7	T23	204	$140,958
(United States) Kevin Chappell*	9	326,507	26	13	T2	66	$1,339,640
(United States) Tag Ridings	10	282,616	28	15	T13	156	$382,670
(United States) Kevin Kisner*	11	279,292	24	10	T12	181	$270,170
(Argentina) Fabián Gómez*	12	265,390	26	16	T7	157	$381,730
(United States) David Mathis	13	265,385	25	16	T8	118	$715,404
(United States) Keegan Bradley*	14	264,760	28	18	Win (twice)	13	$3,758,600
(United States) Colt Knost	15	261,090	27	12	T15	174	$296,817
(United States) Bobby Gates*	16	259,401	29	11	T5	126	$666,735
(Australia) Steven Bowditch	17	257,283	28	15	T9	132	$621,378
(United States) D. J. Brigman	18	246,769	23	10	T16	190	$191,491
(United States) Jim Herman*	19	238,847	22	13	T22	189	$196,845
(United States) Scott Gutschewski	20	236,082	23	12	T18	183	$229,758
(Canada) David Hearn	21	230,440	26	19	T5	104	$869,072
(United States) Joe Affrunti*	22	229,433	6	2	T50	243	$18,837
(United States) Peter Tomasulo	23	223,812	12	5	T22	209	$115,817
(United States) Michael Putnam	24	220,277	21	13	T12	153	$398,400
(United States) Justin Hicks*	25	209,259	23	7	T14	179	$284,990

*PGA Tour rookie in 2011

Green background indicates the player retained his PGA Tour card for 2012 through a win or finish in the top 125 of the money list.
Yellow background indicates the player did not retain his PGA Tour card for 2012, but retained conditional status (finished between 126–150).
Red background indicates the player did not retain his PGA Tour card for 2012 (finished outside the top 150).

== Winners on the PGA Tour in 2011 ==
No.	Date	Player	Tournament	Winning score	Margin of victory	Runner(s)-up
1	Jan 23	(Venezuela) Jhonattan Vegas	Bob Hope Classic	−27 (64-67-67-66-69=333)	Playoff	(United States) Bill Haas, (United States) Gary Woodland
2	Apr 17	(United States) Brendan Steele	Valero Texas Open	−8 (69-72-68-71=280)	1 stroke	(United States) Kevin Chappell, (United States) Charley Hoffman
3	May 29	(United States) Keegan Bradley	HP Byron Nelson Championship	−8 (66-71-72-68=277)	Playoff	(United States) Ryan Palmer
4	July 17	(United States) Chris Kirk	Viking Classic	−22 (67-67-64-68=266)	1 stroke	(United States) Tom Pernice Jr., (United States) George McNeill
5	Aug 14	(United States) Keegan Bradley (2)	PGA Championship	−8 (71-64-68-68=272)	Playoff	(United States) Jason Dufner

== Runners-up on the PGA Tour in 2011 ==
No.	Date	Player	Tournament	Winner	Winning score	Runner-up score
1	Apr 3	(United States) Chris Kirk	Shell Houston Open	(United States) Phil Mickelson	−20 (70-70-63-65=268)	−17 (66-69-69-67=271)
2	Apr 17	(United States) Kevin Chappell	Valero Texas Open	(United States) Brendan Steele	−8 (69-72-68-71=280)	−7 (68-73-70-70=281)

== See also ==
- 2010 PGA Tour Qualifying School graduates
