= Aaron Townsend =

Australian professional golfer (born 1981)

Personal information
- Nationality: Australia
- Born: 4 July 1981 (age 45) Newcastle, New South Wales, Australia
- Height: 6 ft 4 in (1.93 m)
- Weight: 85 kg (187 lb; 13.4 st)
- Spouse: Sally

Career
- Sport: Golf
- Turned professional: 2003
- Current tour: PGA Tour of Australasia
- Professional wins: 3

Number of wins by tour
- PGA Tour of Australasia: 2
- Other: 1

Best results in major championships
- Masters Tournament: DNP
- PGA Championship: DNP
- U.S. Open: DNP
- The Open Championship: CUT: 2012

Aaron Townsend (born 4 July 1981) is an Australian professional golfer who plays on the PGA Tour of Australasia. He has also played a number of events on the European Tour, Challenge Tour and Web.com Tour.

== Professional career ==
Townsend turned professional in 2003. His first professional win in a tour event came at the 2008 New South Wales Open, an event on the Von Nida Tour. Townsend won the event, hosted in his home region of Australia by seven strokes.

In 2009 Townsend won the Cellarbrations NSW PGA Championship on the PGA Tour of Australasia, finishing three strokes ahead of Scott Arnold and Michael Wright. In 2012 Townsend made his first appearance in a major championship at the 2012 Open Championship, following rounds of 70 and 74 he missed the cut by a single shot.

In February 2015 following five years without a win, Townsend won again on the PGA Tour of Australasia event at the Victorian PGA Championship, having holed a bunker shot on the final hole to win to tournament by a single stroke.

== Professional wins (3) ==
=== PGA Tour of Australasia wins (2) ===
No.	Date	Tournament	Winning score	Margin of victory	Runner(s)-up
1	22 Nov 2009	Cellarbrations NSW PGA Championship	−21 (67-61-65-66=259)	3 strokes	(Australia) Scott Arnold, (Australia) Michael Wright
2	13 Feb 2015	Mercedes-Benz Truck and Bus Victorian PGA Championship	−13 (67-73-69-66=275)	1 stroke	(Australia) Scott Strange

=== Von Nida Tour wins (1) ===
No.	Date	Tournament	Winning score	Margin of victory	Runner-up
1	16 Nov 2008	NSW Open	−17 (63-67-69-68=267)	7 strokes	(Australia) Steven Jones

== Results in major championships ==
Tournament	2012
The Open Championship	CUT

Note: Townsend only played in The Open Championship.
CUT = missed the half-way cut
