= King & Bear Classic =

Golf tournament

Tournament information
- Location: St. Augustine, Florida
- Established: 2020
- Courses: World Golf Village (The King & Bear Course)
- Par: 72
- Length: 7,279 yards (6,656 m)
- Tour: Korn Ferry Tour
- Format: Stroke play
- Prize fund: US$600,000
- Month played: June
- Final year: 2020

Tournament record score
- Aggregate: 262 Chris Kirk (2020)
- To par: −26 as above

Final champion
- (United States) Chris Kirk

Location map
- Location in the United States Location in Florida

The King & Bear Classic at World Golf Village was a golf tournament on the Korn Ferry Tour. The tournament was one of several added to the Korn Ferry Tour schedule as part of adjustments due to the COVID-19 pandemic. It was played in June 2020 on the King & Bear Course at the World Golf Village near St. Augustine, Florida. Chris Kirk won the tournament by one stroke over Justin Lower.

== Winners ==
Year	Winner	Score	To par	Margin of victory	Runner-up
2020	(United States) Chris Kirk	262	−26	1 stroke	(United States) Justin Lower
