= 2009 PGA Tour of Australasia =

Golf tour season

2009 PGA Tour of Australasia season
- Duration: 29 January 2009 – 13 December 2009
- Number of official events: 14
- Order of Merit: (Australia) Michael Sim

The 2009 PGA Tour of Australasia was the 37th season on the PGA Tour of Australasia, the main professional golf tour in Australia and New Zealand since it was formed in 1973.

== Schedule ==
The following table lists official events during the 2009 season.

Date	Tournament	Location	Purse (A$)	Winner (Note: The number in brackets after each winner's name is the number of PGA Tour of Australasia events they had won up to and including that tournament. This information is only shown for PGA Tour of Australasia members.)	OWGR points	Other tours (Note: ASA − Asian Tour; EUR − European Tour; NWT − Nationwide Tour; ONE − OneAsia Tour.)	Notes
1 Feb	Subaru Victorian Open	Victoria	110,000	(Australia) Ashley Hall (2)	n/a		
8 Feb	Cellarbrations Victorian PGA Championship	Victoria	110,000	(Australia) Andre Stolz (4)	n/a		
22 Feb	Johnnie Walker Classic	Western Australia	£1,250,000	(New Zealand) Danny Lee (a) (n/a)	32	ASA, EUR	
1 Mar	Moonah Classic	Victoria	US$600,000	(Australia) Alistair Presnell (1)	16	NWT	
8 Mar	HSBC New Zealand PGA Championship	New Zealand	US$600,000	(New Zealand) Steven Alker (4)	16	NWT	
15 Mar	Michael Hill New Zealand Open	New Zealand	US$600,000	(United States) Alex Prugh (n/a)	16	NWT	
25 Oct	John Hughes Geely WA Open	Western Australia	110,000	(Australia) Michael Curtain (1)	n/a		
1 Nov	LSM WA PGA Championship	Western Australia	110,000	(Australia) Andrew Bonhomme (2)	n/a		
8 Nov	Cellarbrations Queensland PGA Championship	Queensland	110,000	(Australia) Steven Bowditch (2)	n/a		
15 Nov	JBWere Masters	Victoria	1,500,000	(United States) Tiger Woods (n/a)	28	EUR	
22 Nov	Cellarbrations NSW PGA Championship	New South Wales	110,000	(Australia) Aaron Townsend (1)	n/a		
29 Nov	NSW Open	New South Wales	135,000	(Australia) Leigh McKechnie (1)	n/a		
6 Dec	Australian Open	New South Wales	1,500,000	(Australia) Adam Scott (2)	32	ONE	Flagship event
13 Dec	Australian PGA Championship	Queensland	1,500,000	(Australia) Robert Allenby (12)	26	ONE	

== Order of Merit ==
The Order of Merit was based on prize money won during the season, calculated in Australian dollars.

Position	Player	Prize money (A$)
1	(Australia) Michael Sim	315,088
2	(Australia) Alistair Presnell	223,212
3	(Australia) Peter O'Malley	174,996
4	(New Zealand) Josh Geary	154,135
5	(New Zealand) David Smail	134,446
