= Jim Herman =

American professional golfer (born 1977)

Personal information
- Full name: James Robert Herman
- Nickname: Hermie
- Nationality: United States
- Born: November 5, 1977 (age 48) Cincinnati, Ohio, U.S.
- Height: 6 ft 0 in (1.83 m)
- Weight: 170 lb (77 kg; 12 st)
- Spouse: Carolyn
- Children: Abigail, Andrew

Career
- Sport: Golf
- College: Cincinnati
- Turned professional: 2000
- Current tour: PGA Tour
- Former tour: Web.com Tour
- Professional wins: 4
- Highest ranking: 68 (April 3, 2016)

Number of wins by tour
- PGA Tour: 3
- PGA Tour of Australasia: 1
- Korn Ferry Tour: 1

Best results in major championships
- Masters Tournament: 53rd: 2021
- PGA Championship: T44: 2017
- U.S. Open: T47: 2010
- The Open Championship: T43: 2016

James Robert Herman (born November 5, 1977) is an American professional golfer who plays on the PGA Tour.

== Early life ==
Born and raised in Cincinnati, Ohio, Herman learned to play golf at the Shawnee Lookout course in Hamilton County. He graduated from Our Lady of Victory grade school, and played golf at St. Xavier High School and graduated in 1996. He played college golf at the University of Cincinnati, and turned professional in 2000.

== Professional career ==
Herman played on the mini-tour, Golden Bear Tour from 2001 to 2004. He was then an assistant golf pro at several golf clubs before qualifying for the Nationwide Tour after finishing T74 at the 2007 PGA Tour Qualifying Tournament. He played on the Nationwide Tour in 2008–10 and 2012, winning once at the 2010 Moonah Classic in Australia.

Herman was a PGA Tour rookie in 2011, after finishing 19th on the Nationwide Tour money list in 2010. He played in the U.S. Open in 2010 and finished 47th.

In 2011, he finished 178th in the FedEx points list and dropped back to the Nationwide Tour (renamed the Web.com Tour) for 2012. In 2012, he finished 25th to earn a return to the PGA Tour for 2013.

In 2013 he finished 139th on the PGA Tour, but ranked 19th (excluding Top 25) in the Web.com Finals. Similarly in 2014, he finished 182nd on Tour but then ranked 7th in the Web.com Finals.

A final round of 65 at the Zurich Classic of New Orleans in 2015, moved him into a tie for fourth, a career best finish at the time. He finished 2015 in 74th place in the FedEx list, thus avoiding the Web.com Tour for the first time.

On April 3, 2016, Herman recorded his first PGA Tour victory, in his 106th start, at the Shell Houston Open. He shot a final round of 68 for a 15-under-par total to complete a one shot win over Henrik Stenson. After Stenson missed a putt to tie Herman, he successfully two putted the final green for the win and earned an invitation to the following week's Masters Tournament, an event he then played for his first time. He also earned his first invitation to the PGA Championship as a Tour winner and the Open Championship as an alternate after Billy Hurley III withdrew. Herman's career high world ranking is 68th, achieved after his win.

Herman was an assistant professional at Trump National Golf Club in Bedminster, New Jersey. President Donald Trump, the course owner, encouraged Herman to chase his dream of playing professionally.

A foot injury limited Herman to nine events in 2018. He started the next season with a Major Medical Extension, but did not meet the terms and was demoted to the Past Champions Category.

In July 2019, Herman won the Barbasol Championship in Kentucky. Herman carded a two-under 70 in the closing round to finish on 26 under overall ahead of Kelly Kraft. Kraft had been leading by one with three holes left to play, but could only manage bogeys on the par-three 16th and par-four 17th. The victory secured Herman his PGA Tour card until the end of the 2020–21 season as well as granting him entry to the 2020 Players Championship, PGA Championship and Sentry Tournament of Champions. Prior to the win, Herman had only made three cuts in 19 events during the 2019 season.

In August 2020, Herman won the Wyndham Championship. This win put him into the FedEx Cup playoffs.

== Professional wins (4) ==
=== PGA Tour wins (3) ===
| No. | Date | Tournament | Winning score | To par | Margin of victory | Runner-up |
|---|---|---|---|---|---|---|
| 1 | Apr 3, 2016 | Shell Houston Open | 69-69-67-68=273 | −15 | 1 stroke | (Sweden) Henrik Stenson |
| 2 | Jul 21, 2019 | Barbasol Championship | 65-65-62-70=262 | −26 | 1 stroke | (United States) Kelly Kraft |
| 3 | Aug 16, 2020 | Wyndham Championship | 66-69-61-63=259 | −21 | 1 stroke | (United States) Billy Horschel |

=== Nationwide Tour wins (1) ===
| No. | Date | Tournament | Winning score | To par | Margin of victory | Runner-up |
|---|---|---|---|---|---|---|
| 1 | Feb 7, 2010 | Moonah Classic^{1} | 62-70-75-70=277 | −11 | Playoff | (United States) Chris Kirk |

^{1}Co-sanctioned by the PGA Tour of Australasia

Nationwide Tour playoff record (1–0)

| No. | Year | Tournament | Opponent | Result |
|---|---|---|---|---|
| 1 | 2010 | Moonah Classic | (United States) Chris Kirk | Won with birdie on first extra hole |

== Results in major championships ==
Results not in chronological order in 2020.

| Tournament | 2010 | 2011 | 2012 | 2013 | 2014 | 2015 | 2016 | 2017 | 2018 |
|---|---|---|---|---|---|---|---|---|---|
| Masters Tournament | | | | | | | CUT | | |
| U.S. Open | T47 | | CUT | T67 | | | CUT | | |
| The Open Championship | | | | | | | T43 | | |
| PGA Championship | | | | | | | CUT | T44 | |

| Tournament | 2019 | 2020 | 2021 | 2022 | 2023 | 2024 |
|---|---|---|---|---|---|---|
| Masters Tournament | | | 53 | | | |
| PGA Championship | | T77 | CUT | | | |
| U.S. Open | | CUT | | | | CUT |
| The Open Championship | | NT | | | | |

Did not play

CUT = missed the half-way cut
"T" = tied for place
NT = no tournament due to COVID-19 pandemic

== Results in The Players Championship ==
| Tournament | 2016 | 2017 | 2018 | 2019 | 2020 | 2021 |
|---|---|---|---|---|---|---|
| The Players Championship | CUT | T35 | | | C | CUT |

Did not play

CUT = missed the halfway cut
"T" indicates a tie for a place
C = Canceled after the first round due to the COVID-19 pandemic

== Results in World Golf Championships ==
Results not in chronological order before 2015.

| Tournament | 2011 | 2012 | 2013 | 2014 | 2015 | 2016 | 2017 | 2018 | 2019 | 2020 | 2021 |
|---|---|---|---|---|---|---|---|---|---|---|---|
| Championship | | | | | | | | | | | |
| Match Play | | | | | | | | | | NT^{1} | |
| Invitational | | | | | | T27 | | | | | T46 |
| Champions | T38 | | | | | | | | | NT^{1} | NT^{1} |

^{1}Canceled due to COVID-19 pandemic

Did not play

NT = No tournament
"T" = tied

== See also ==
- 2010 Nationwide Tour graduates
- 2012 Web.com Tour graduates
- 2013 Web.com Tour Finals graduates
- 2014 Web.com Tour Finals graduates
