= Kevin Chappell =

American professional golfer (born 1986)

Personal information
- Full name: Kevin Alan Chappell
- Nationality: United States
- Born: July 8, 1986 (age 40) Fresno, California, U.S.
- Height: 6 ft 0 in (1.83 m)
- Weight: 190 lb (86 kg; 14 st)
- Spouse: Elizabeth (née Petrie) (m. 2013)
- Children: 2

Career
- Sport: Golf
- College: UCLA
- Turned professional: 2008
- Current tours: PGA Tour; European Tour; Korn Ferry Tour
- Professional wins: 2
- Highest ranking: 23 (April 23, 2017) (as of October 25, 2026)

Number of wins by tour
- PGA Tour: 1
- Korn Ferry Tour: 1

Best results in major championships
- Masters Tournament: T7: 2017
- PGA Championship: T13: 2014
- U.S. Open: T3: 2011
- The Open Championship: T6: 2018

Achievements and awards
- Haskins Award: 2008

Kevin Alan Chappell (born July 8, 1986) is an American professional golfer who is currently playing on the PGA Tour.

== Amateur career ==
Chappell was born in Fresno, California. He attended the University of California, Los Angeles where he won the Jack Nicklaus Award as the collegiate player of the year in 2008. He also won the Arnold Palmer Award for claiming the NCAA championship. He was a PING first-team All-American and Pac-10 golfer of the year in 2008 after winning three collegiate titles and held the UCLA single season scoring record. He was a three-time PING All-American selection. He was ranked the third best amateur in world golf at the end of the 2008 season.

Chappell represented the United States as a member of the championship team at the 2004 Junior World Team Championship and the 2007 Fuji Xerox USA vs. Japan Collegiate Golf Championship. He was also a member of the 2008 U.S. Palmer Cup team.

== Professional career ==
Chappell turned professional the day after the 2008 Palmer Cup and began playing mainly on the Nationwide Tour. A stand out result early in his career on the PGA Tour was at the 2009 AT&T Pebble Beach National Pro-Am where he finished tied for sixth. Chappell won his first professional event at the 2010 Fresh Express Classic at TPC Stonebrae on the Nationwide Tour, winning by one stroke over David Hearn after a final round of 65. He finished the year 9th on the money list and earned his 2011 PGA Tour card.

In his rookie season on tour, Chappell finished tied for second behind Brendan Steele at the 2011 Valero Texas Open, after a bogey on the 17th hole put him one stroke behind. This was Chappell's best ever career finish on the PGA Tour to date. In 2011, he also qualified for the U.S. Open, his first ever major championship appearance and he shot a 66 on Sunday to finish in a tie for third place and ensure himself of entry into the 2012 U.S. Open and Masters Tournament. He also finished in a tied for the third place in his final event of the season, the Children's Miracle Network Hospitals Classic. He ended the year 84th in the FedEx Cup standings.

Chappell finished tied for tenth at his second consecutive U.S. Open in 2012; it was his only top-10 finish of 2012 and he finished the season 125th on the money list, earning the last available Tour card based on season earnings. Chappell had his best year on the PGA Tour to date in 2013, making 16 cuts, with three top 10s, which included a second runner-up finish of his career at the Memorial Tournament. He ended the year 45th on the FedEx Cup standings. During the 2014 and 2015, Chappell was consistent, making the majority of cuts he played in, but only recorded three top-10 finishes in this period.

The 2016 season was an inconsistent but impressive season for Chappell with a number of missed cuts and lower place finishes. However, he has finished runner-up three times at the RSM Classic behind Kevin Kisner, at the Arnold Palmer Invitational, a single shot behind Jason Day, and at The Players Championship, again behind Jason Day. He lost in a three-man playoff with Rory McIlroy and Ryan Moore at the Tour Championship to McIlroy.

After 180 PGA Tour starts and six runner-up finishes, Chappell earned his first win at the 2017 Valero Texas Open. Chappell birdied the 72nd hole for a one-stroke win over Brooks Koepka. The win also moved Chappell to a career high 23rd in the Official World Golf Ranking. Chappell also earned the tenth and final automatic position for the 2017 Presidents Cup.

In November 2018, Chappell announced that he had been playing through injury for most of the 2018 season, and now needed microdiscectomy surgery. After finishing top-30 in FedEx Cup points in both 2016 and 2017, Chappell only managed to finish 83rd in 2018. Chappell was given 23 starts to fulfill a medical exemption for the next season.

Chappell made his return to the PGA Tour in September 2019 at the Military Tribute at The Greenbrier. In the second round, he tied the tour record with nine consecutive birdies and shot the 10th round of 59 (–11), and the 11th under 60, in PGA Tour history.

=== Scorecard ===
September 13, 2019

Hole	10	11	12	13	14	15	16	17	18	1	2	3	4	5	6	7	8	9
Par	4	4	5	4	4	3	4	5	3	4	4	3	4	4	4	4	3	4
	E	−1	−2	−3	−4	−5	−6	−7	−8	−9	−9	−9	−9	−10	−10	−11	−11	−11

In November 2025, Chappell announced his retirement from professional golf.

== Professional wins (2) ==
=== PGA Tour wins (1) ===
No.	Date	Tournament	Winning score	Margin of victory	Runner-up
1	Apr 23, 2017	Valero Texas Open	−12 (69-68-71-68=276)	1 stroke	(United States) Brooks Koepka

PGA Tour playoff record (0–1)

No.	Year	Tournament	Opponents	Result
1	2016	Tour Championship	(Northern Ireland) Rory McIlroy, (United States) Ryan Moore	McIlroy won with birdie on fourth extra hole Chappell eliminated by birdie on first hole

=== Web.com Tour wins (1) ===
No.	Date	Tournament	Winning score	Margin of victory	Runner-up
1	Apr 18, 2010	Fresh Express Classic	−20 (66-67-66-65=264)	1 stroke	(Canada) David Hearn

== Results in major championships ==
Results not in chronological order in 2020.

Tournament	2011	2012	2013	2014	2015	2016	2017	2018
Masters Tournament		T44					T7	CUT
U.S. Open	T3	T10	T32		T46	CUT	T23	65
The Open Championship						T53	CUT	T6
PGA Championship			CUT	T13	T43	CUT	T33	T65

Tournament	2019	2020	2021	2022
Masters Tournament				
PGA Championship				
U.S. Open				CUT
The Open Championship		NT		

Top 10
Did not play

CUT = missed the half-way cut
"T" = tied
NT = No tournament due to the COVID-19 pandemic

=== Summary ===
Tournament	Wins	2nd	3rd	Top-5	Top-10	Top-25	Events	Cuts made
Masters Tournament	0	0	0	0	1	1	3	2
U.S. Open	0	0	1	1	2	3	8	6
The Open Championship	0	0	0	0	1	1	3	2
PGA Championship	0	0	0	0	0	1	6	4
Totals	0	0	1	1	4	6	20	14

- Most consecutive cuts made – 4 (2011 U.S. Open – 2013 U.S. Open)
- Longest streak of top-10s – 1 (four times)

== Results in The Players Championship ==
Tournament	2011	2012	2013	2014	2015	2016	2017	2018
The Players Championship	T69	CUT	T68	T26	CUT	2	T35	CUT

Top 10

CUT = missed the halfway cut
"T" indicates a tie for a place

== Results in World Golf Championships ==
Tournament	2016	2017	2018
Championship		T55	T30
Match Play		T39	T36
Invitational	T3	T13	T39
Champions	T35		

Top 10
Did not play

QF, R16, R32, R64 = Round in which player lost in match play
"T" = Tied

== U.S. national team appearances ==
Amateur

- Junior World Team Championship: 2004
- USA vs. Japan Collegiate Golf Championship: 2007
- Palmer Cup: 2008

Professional

- Presidents Cup: 2017 (winners)

== See also ==
- 2010 Nationwide Tour graduates
- Lowest rounds of golf
