= D. J. Brigman =

American professional golfer (born 1976)

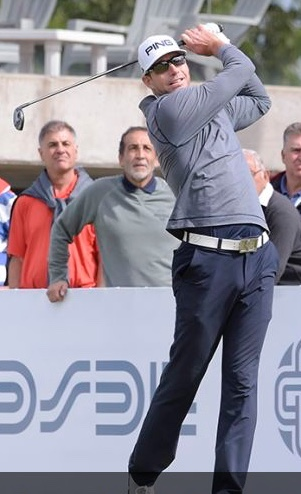
- Brigman in 2017

Personal information
- Full name: David Franklin Brigman Jr.
- Nationality: United States
- Born: May 3, 1976 (age 50) Clovis, New Mexico, U.S.
- Height: 6 ft 4 in (1.93 m)
- Weight: 195 lb (88 kg; 13.9 st)
- Spouse: Samantha Martinez
- Children: 3

Career
- Sport: Golf
- College: University of New Mexico
- Turned professional: 1999
- Former tours: PGA Tour; Web.com Tour; NGA Hooters Tour
- Professional wins: 5

Number of wins by tour
- Korn Ferry Tour: 2
- Other: 3

Best results in major championships
- Masters Tournament: DNP
- PGA Championship: DNP
- U.S. Open: T30: 2007
- The Open Championship: DNP

David Franklin "D. J." Brigman Jr. (born May 3, 1976) is an American professional golfer who played on the PGA Tour and the Web.com Tour.

== Early life and amateur career ==
Brigman was born in Clovis, New Mexico. He played college golf at the University of New Mexico and graduated in 1999. During his college career, he won both the 1996 and 1998 New Mexico State Amateur titles, and the 1998 U.S. Collegiate Golf Championship, thanks to a final-round 68 to top second-place finisher Charles Howell III.

== Professional career ==
In 1999, Brigman turned professional. Shortly thereafter, he won the 2000 New Mexico Open.

Brigman bounced back and forth between the PGA Tour and its developmental tour. He played the Nationwide Tour in 2002, 2003, 2006 and 2008 to 2010 and the PGA Tour in 2004, 2005, 2007, and 2011. He won twice on the Nationwide Tour. His best finishes on the PGA Tour were a pair of T-11s in 2004; at the Shell Houston Open and the Bell Canadian Open.

Brigman first earned entry onto the PGA Tour in dramatic fashion by holing a 12-foot putt on the 18th hole of the 2003 Nationwide Tour Championship. The putt vaulted him to a second-place finish, clinching a spot for promotion to the PGA Tour for 2004.

He has also made three appearances in the U.S. Open via sectional and regional qualifying, playing in the 2005, 2007, and 2008 events, with a T30 as his top finish at Oakmont Country Club in 2007.

In July 2010, Brigman won the Nationwide Tour's Nationwide Children's Hospital Invitational, shooting a bogey free 64 in the final round at the Ohio State Scarlet Course in Columbus, Ohio. He earned a return to the PGA Tour for the fourth time in 2011, by finishing as the 18th leading money winner on the 2010 Nationwide Tour, with total winnings of $246,769. His 286 total in the 2010 Nationwide Tour Championship gave him a T21st finish.

On June 25, 2011, Brigman made his first career hole in one during play at the PGA Tour's Travelers Championship by dropping a nine iron into the cup on the par-3 150 yard 11th hole at TPC at River Highlands.

On November 18, 2011, Brigman qualified for PGA Tour Q-School finals that were held on November 30 through December 5, 2011. At Q-School, Brigman's six round total of 428 left him four shots away from full-time PGA Tour status. He returned to the Nationwide Tour for the 2012 season.

During the 2013 Web.com Tour season, Brigman had three top-10 finishes including a T2nd at the South Georgia Classic. He also surpassed $2M in career profession earnings.

On June 22, 2017, Brigman won the Metropolitan Open in St. Louis, Missouri, hosted by The Country Club of St. Albans. He shot a three-round total of 202.

== Professional wins (5) ==
=== Nationwide Tour wins (2) ===
No.	Date	Tournament	Winning score	Margin of victory	Runner(s)-up
1	Oct 19, 2003	Permian Basin Charity Golf Classic	−16 (71-68-67-66=272)	1 stroke	(United States) Jason Dufner, (Australia) Mark Hensby (United States) Jimmy Walker
2	Jul 25, 2010	Nationwide Children's Hospital Invitational	−10 (66-72-72-64=274)	1 stroke	(United States) Jamie Lovemark

=== NGA Hooters Tour wins (1) ===
No.	Date	Tournament	Winning score	Margin of victory	Runner-up
1	Jul 22, 2001	Chester's San Antonio Classic	−17 (70-63-66-72=271)	2 strokes	(United States) Zoran Zorkic

=== Other wins (2) ===
- 2000 New Mexico Open
- 2017 Metropolitan Open (St. Louis, Missouri)

== Results in major championships ==
Tournament	2005	2006	2007	2008
U.S. Open	T71		T30	CUT

Did not play

CUT = missed the half-way cut
"T" = tied
Note: Brigman only played in the U.S. Open.

== See also ==
- 2003 Nationwide Tour graduates
- 2004 PGA Tour Qualifying School graduates
- 2006 PGA Tour Qualifying School graduates
- 2010 Nationwide Tour graduates
