= Jhonattan Vegas =

Venezuelan professional golfer (born 1984)

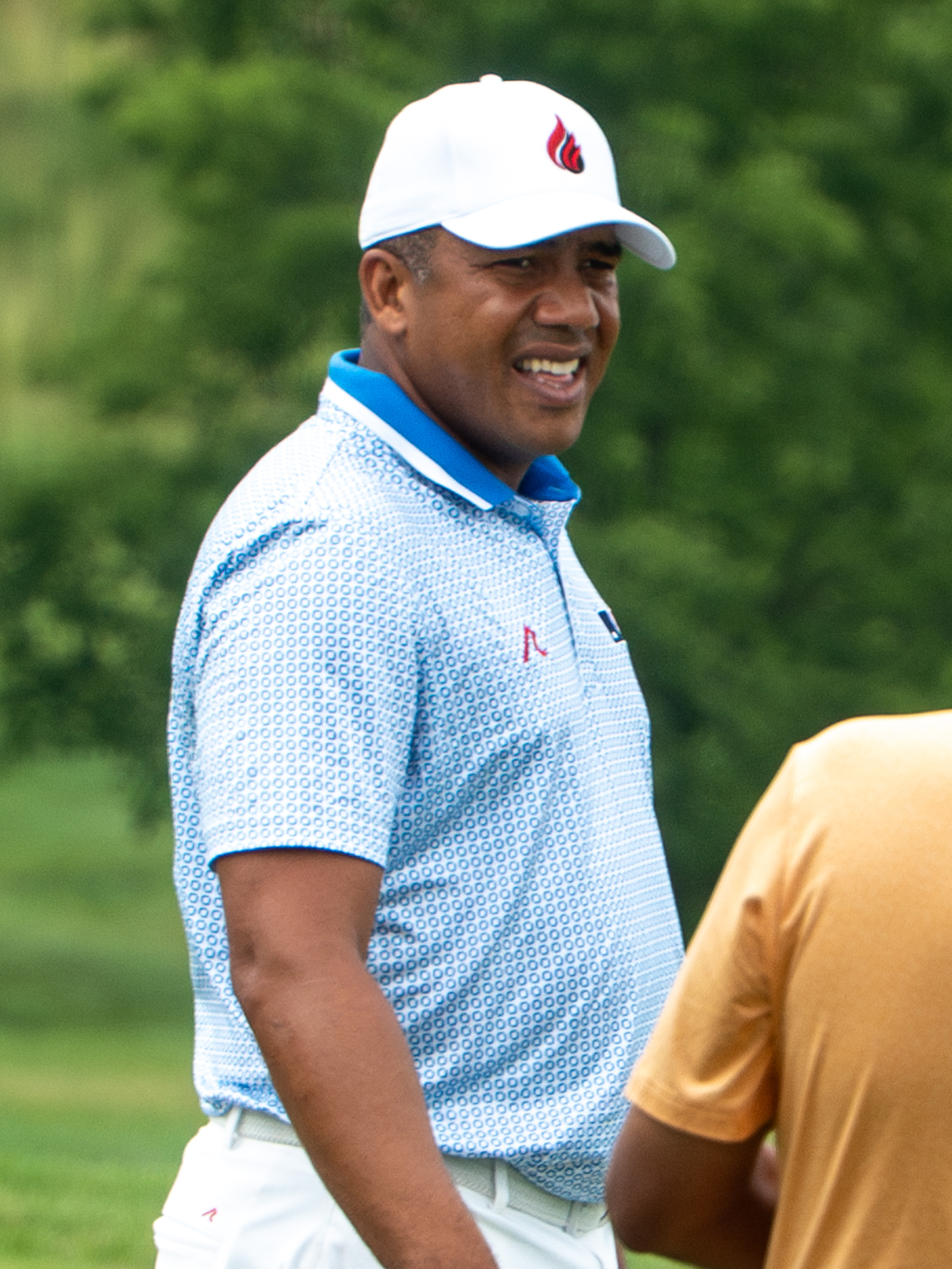
- Vegas at the 2025 Travelers Championship

Personal information
- Full name: Jhonattan Luis Vegas
- Nationality: Venezuela
- Born: 19 August 1984 (age 42) Maturín, Venezuela
- Height: 6 ft 3 in (1.91 m)
- Weight: 230 lb (100 kg; 16 st)

Career
- Sport: Golf
- College: University of Texas
- Turned professional: 2008
- Current tour: PGA Tour
- Former tour: Web.com Tour
- Professional wins: 6
- Highest ranking: 35 (27 August 2017) (as of 25 October 2026)

Number of wins by tour
- PGA Tour: 4
- Korn Ferry Tour: 1
- Other: 2

Best results in major championships
- Masters Tournament: T38: 2018
- PGA Championship: T5: 2025
- U.S. Open: T41: 2018
- The Open Championship: T56: 2025

Jhonattan Luis Vegas (born 19 August 1984) is a Venezuelan professional golfer who plays on the PGA Tour and is a two-time Olympian. He is the only Venezuelan to earn a PGA tour card or win a PGA tour event, and the only one to represent his country in the Presidents Cup or the Olympics.

== Early life ==
Vegas was born in Maturín, Venezuela. He grew up playing many sports, but it was golf – which he played with his parents and three brothers – at which he truly excelled and he became one of the top junior golfers in Venezuela. Seeing more opportunities to improve his game and also a chance to go to school for free, he moved to the United States in 2002 with a golf instructor with whom he was familiar in Venezuela. They settled in The Woodlands outside of Houston, Texas.

== Amateur career ==
In Houston, Vegas won three junior tournaments and qualified for the 2003 Houston Open on the PGA Tour as an amateur, but missed the cut. That year he was offered a golf scholarship to the University of Texas. In his freshman year, he helped the Longhorns win the Big 12 Championship and come in 4th at the NCAA championship. In 2005, he helped them reach 24th at the NCAA Championship and in 2007 to a tie for 11th. That same year, he represented Venezuela in the 23rd World Amateur Team Championship for the Eisenhower Trophy where the team finished in 30th.

In 2006, before his senior year, he won Venezuela's National Amateur Championship in Maracaibo. He graduated with a degree in kinesiology.

== Professional career ==
Vegas turned professional in 2008 and played in his first PGA event as a professional at the Texas Open, where he also made his first cut; but he did not earn his PGA Card at the qualifying tournament that year.

He then started playing the Nationwide Tour in 2009, scoring two top-10 finishes in his rookie year. That year he also represented Venezuela in the 2009 Omega Mission Hills World Cup with Alfredo Adrian. They finished tied for 12th place.

Vegas won his first Nationwide Tour event in 2010 at the Preferred Health Systems Wichita Open. He finished the season 7th on the money list and earned his 2011 PGA Tour card, the first Venezuelan to do so. He also competed in one PGA event, the Puerto Rico Open, where he again made the cut.

On 23 January 2011, Vegas won his first PGA Tour event, the Bob Hope Classic, after defeating Tour veteran Bill Haas and Gary Woodland in a sudden-death playoff. It was Vegas' fifth overall start on the PGA Tour and the second as a member of the tour. The victory was the first by a Venezuelan at a PGA Tour event; Vegas earned entry into the Masters and a two-year exemption on the PGA Tour. In his next start, he finished in a tie for 3rd at the Farmers Insurance Open, holding a share of the lead on the back nine and moved to a then-career Official World Golf Ranking (OWGR) high of 69th. Vegas was the first PGA Tour rookie to lead the FedEx Cup standings and that year he made it the BMW Championship, the third round of the FedEx Cup playoffs, for the first time.

In July 2012, Vegas was the runner-up finisher at the annual Telus World Skins Game to Paul Casey held in Halifax, Nova Scotia, after having won the 2011 event in Banff, Alberta. He had just two top-10 finishes, coming in 7th at The Players Championship and 4th at the AT&T National.

Vegas started 2013 with three missed cuts in three tournaments. He sat out the remainder of the 2013 season after shoulder surgery. Vegas attempted to regain his PGA Tour status through the Web.com Tour Finals, but fell short and started the 2013–14 season on a Medical Extension. He satisfied his medical extension with a T3 finish at the 2014 John Deere Classic.

Vegas finished the 2014–15 season 153rd in the FedEx Cup and just outside the top 25 in the Web.com Tour Finals, limiting him to past champion status for the 2015–16 PGA Tour season. It was his first full season of play without a top-10 finish.

In what was his best season, despite some near-wins and collapses during the 2015–16 season, he earned his second career PGA Tour win at the RBC Canadian Open and regained full Tour privileges through the 2017–18 season. He had four other top-10 finishes and went to the Tour Championship for the first time where he finished tied for 24th – his best finish so far. He was also Venezuela's first representative in golf for the 2016 Summer Olympics, where he tied for 50th.

In the 2016–17 season, Vegas successfully defended his title at the 2017 RBC Canadian Open for his third PGA Tour win. The win also moved him to a then career-high 48th in the OWGR. That season, he also had top-10 finishes at the Honda Classic and the Northern Trust and made it to the Tour Championship again, finishing in 30th place. Vegas peaked at 35th in the world and in 2017 and he became the first player from Venezuela to compete in the Presidents Cup.

In the 2017–18 season, Vegas had just one top-10 finish, coming in a tie for 7th at the 2018 Sentry Tournament of Champions, but played well enough to get to the second round of the FedEx Cup playoffs.

He had only one top-10 finish in 2018–19 as well, coming in a tie for 3rd at the Players Championship, but again made it to the FedEx Cup playoffs.

In 2020, a season shortened by the global COVID-19 pandemic, he had only one top-10 finish again, coming in 9th in the Puerto Rico Open. He also qualified for the Olympics again, as Venezuela's sole representative in golf for the 2020 Summer Olympics in Tokyo where he finished tied for 16th. That tournament was postponed to 2021 due to the pandemic.

In 2020–21, Vegas had four top-10 finishes including three times that he came in 2nd place – at the Puerto Rico Open, the 3M Open and the Palmetto Championship. He again made it to the BMW Championship, the penultimate round of the FedEx Cup Championship.

The next season he had only two top-10 finishes.

Vegas missed nearly all of the 2022–23 season due to injuries to his elbow and shoulder, which included a piece of bone in his elbow that had broken off and lodged into his elbow joint. He had surgery to remove the bone but complications from the elbow injury had caused inflammation to travel up his arm and into his shoulder. He underwent another surgery in May 2023 to address the issue, but he was told the injuries would linger and that he needed to learn to live with pain. As a result, he only played in 7 tournaments in 2022–23 doing no better than a tie for 21st.

In 2024, Vegas struggled at the beginning of the year, missing more cuts than he made and not breaking into the top-20 in PGA tour events (he did finish in 14th at the Australian Open). But in July, still playing on a medical exemption, he was able to fight through pain to win the 2024 3M Championship — his 4th career win. He had just 10 starts left on his Major Medical before the 3M but will now play out of the tournament winners category through 2026. He earned exemptions into The Sentry, Masters Tournament and PGA Championship for 2025. He also jumped from 149th to 66th in the FedEx Cup standings, where the top 70 advance. He finished the season 70th and made it into the first round of FedEx Cup playoffs for the 4th time in his career. Ironically, he was only able to play in the 3M tournament because he failed, for the first time, to qualify for the Olympics.

== Personal life ==
Vegas's younger brother, Julio, followed him to Texas where he was an All-Conference and All-American Honorable Mention golfer; he won the 2012 NCAA Team Championship and 2013 Big 12 Championship and was the 2012 Morris Williams Intercollegiate individual champion. He had previously won the 2003 and 2004 Venezuelan National Junior Champion and was runner-up for the 2007 Venezuelan National Amateur Championship. He went on to play on the Korn Ferry Tour and other professional golf tours.

== Professional wins (6) ==
=== PGA Tour wins (4) ===
No.	Date	Tournament	Winning score	To par	Margin of victory	Runner(s)-up
1	23 Jan 2011	Bob Hope Classic	64-67-67-66-69=333	−27	Playoff	(United States) Bill Haas, (United States) Gary Woodland
2	24 Jul 2016	RBC Canadian Open	73-69-70-64=276	−12	1 stroke	(United States) Dustin Johnson, (Scotland) Martin Laird, (Spain) Jon Rahm
3	30 Jul 2017	RBC Canadian Open (2)	66-69-67-65=267	−21	Playoff	(United States) Charley Hoffman
4	28 Jul 2024	3M Open	68-66-63-70=267	−17	1 stroke	(United States) Max Greyserman

PGA Tour playoff record (2–0)

No.	Year	Tournament	Opponent(s)	Result
1	2011	Bob Hope Classic	(United States) Bill Haas, (United States) Gary Woodland	Won with par on second extra hole Haas eliminated by birdie on first hole
2	2017	RBC Canadian Open	(United States) Charley Hoffman	Won with birdie on first extra hole

=== Nationwide Tour wins (1) ===
No.	Date	Tournament	Winning score	To par	Margin of victory	Runner-up
1	8 Aug 2010	Preferred Health Systems Wichita Open	65-68-67-64=264	−20	1 stroke	(United States) Roberto Castro

=== Tour de las Américas wins (1) ===
No.	Date	Tournament	Winning score	To par	Margin of victory	Runner-up
1	12 Dec 2010	Abierto Visa de la República^{1}	68-66-65-71=270	−10	6 strokes	(Argentina) Andrés Romero

^{1}Co-sanctioned by the TPG Tour

=== Other wins (1) ===
No.	Date	Tournament	Winning score	To par	Margin of victory	Runner-up
1	25 Jul 2011	Telus World Skins Game	$140,000		$15,000	(United States) Lucas Glover

== Results in major championships ==
Results not in chronological order in 2020.

Tournament	2011	2012	2013	2014	2015	2016	2017	2018
Masters Tournament	CUT						CUT	T38
U.S. Open							CUT	T41
The Open Championship							CUT	CUT
PGA Championship	T51					T22	CUT	T59

Tournament	2019	2020	2021	2022	2023	2024	2025	2026
Masters Tournament							CUT	
PGA Championship	CUT			CUT			T5	T44
U.S. Open	CUT		T57				T46	
The Open Championship		NT					T56	

Top 10
Did not play

CUT = missed the half-way cut
"T" = tied
NT = no tournament due to COVID-19 pandemic

=== Summary ===
Tournament	Wins	2nd	3rd	Top-5	Top-10	Top-25	Events	Cuts made
Masters Tournament	0	0	0	0	0	0	4	1
PGA Championship	0	0	0	1	1	2	8	5
U.S. Open	0	0	0	0	0	0	5	3
The Open Championship	0	0	0	0	0	0	3	1
Totals	0	0	0	1	1	2	20	10

- Most consecutive cuts made – 4 (2025 PGA Championship – 2025 PGA Championship, current)
- Longest streak of top-10s – 1 (once)

== Results in The Players Championship ==
Tournament	2011	2012	2013	2014	2015	2016	2017	2018	2019
The Players Championship	CUT	T7			T42	T57	CUT	T41	T3

Tournament	2020	2021	2022	2023	2024	2025	2026
The Players Championship	C	T61	CUT	CUT		60	CUT

Top 10
Did not play

CUT = missed the halfway cut
"T" indicates a tie for a place
C = cancelled after the first round due to the COVID-19 pandemic

== Results in World Golf Championships ==
Results not in chronological order prior to 2015.

Tournament	2011	2012	2013	2014	2015	2016	2017	2018
Championship	T31						T38	T20
Match Play							T17	T52
Invitational	T66						T17	T53
Champions	10					T45	T20	

Top 10
Did not play

"T" = tied

== Team appearances ==
Amateur

- Eisenhower Trophy (representing Venezuela): 2002

Professional

- World Cup (representing Venezuela): 2009, 2016, 2018
- Presidents Cup (representing the International team): 2017

== See also ==
- 2010 Nationwide Tour graduates
- Golf in Venezuela
