= Peter O'Malley (golfer) =

Australian professional golfer (born 1965)

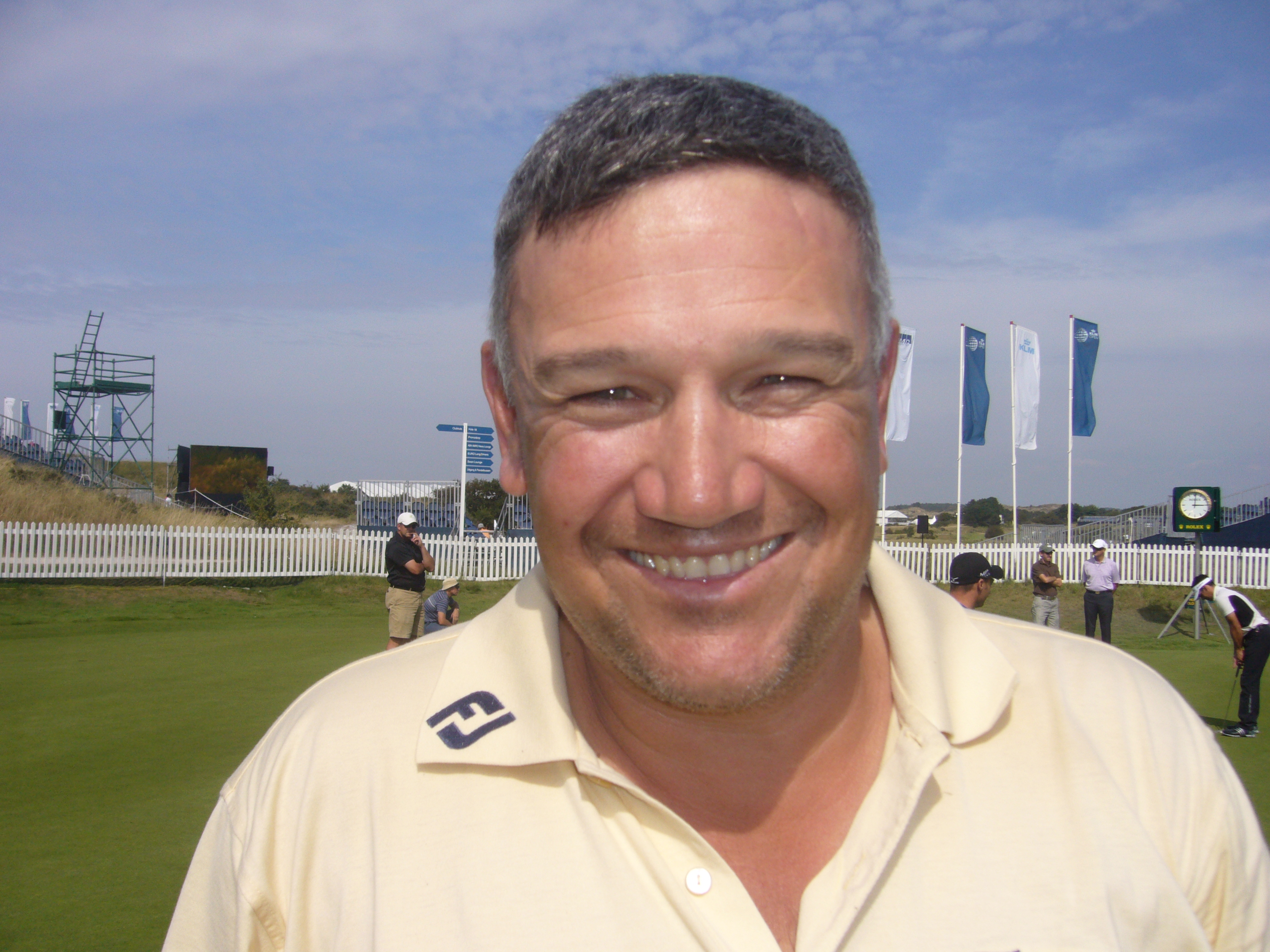
- O'Malley at KLM Open in 2009

Personal information
- Full name: Peter Anthony O'Malley
- Nationality: Australia
- Born: 23 June 1965 (age 61) Bathurst, New South Wales, Australia
- Height: 5 ft 9 in (1.75 m)
- Weight: 228 lb (103 kg; 16.3 st)

Career
- Sport: Golf
- Turned professional: 1987
- Current tours: European Seniors Tour; PGA Tour of Australasia
- Former tour: European Tour
- Professional wins: 9
- Highest ranking: 61 (5 September 1999)

Number of wins by tour
- European Tour: 3
- PGA Tour of Australasia: 5
- Korn Ferry Tour: 2
- Other: 1

Best results in major championships
- Masters Tournament: DNP
- PGA Championship: CUT: 1999, 2000, 2002
- U.S. Open: T67: 1996
- The Open Championship: T7: 1997

Peter Anthony O'Malley (born 23 June 1965) is an Australian professional golfer.

== Early life and amateur career ==
In 1965, O'Malley was born in Bathurst, New South Wales. He won the Australian Junior Championship and the New Zealand Amateur in 1986.

== Professional career ==
In 1987, O'Malley turned professional. He has won several times on the PGA Tour of Australasia but spent most of the year playing on the European Tour. He was runner-up to Mark James in his first European Tour event, the 1989 Dubai Desert Classic, and has since won three titles on the European Tour.

Perhaps the most famous of these three victories was his Scottish Open win which he played the last five holes in the final round in seven under par to snatch victory.

O'Malley made the top-100 on the European Tour Order of Merit every year from 1989 through to 2007, with a best ranking of tenth in 1995. His greatest strength is his accuracy, and he topped the European Tour's driving accuracy rankings in 2001 and 2002.

== Personal life ==
O'Malley is married to Jill O'Malley and has two children, Tom and Jess.

== Amateur wins ==
- 1985 New South Wales Medal
- 1986 Australian Junior, New Zealand Amateur, Lake Macquarie Amateur, New South Wales Amateur

== Professional wins (9) ==
=== European Tour wins (3) ===
No.	Date	Tournament	Winning score	Margin of victory	Runner(s)-up
1	11 Jul 1992	Bell's Scottish Open	−18 (65-70-65-62=262)	2 strokes	(Scotland) Colin Montgomerie
2	14 May 1995	Benson & Hedges International Open	−8 (68-65-74-73=280)	1 stroke	(England) Mark James, (Italy) Costantino Rocca
3	10 Jun 2001	Compass Group English Open	−13 (70-69-70-66=275)	1 stroke	(France) Raphaël Jacquelin

European Tour playoff record (0–1)

No.	Year	Tournament	Opponent	Result
1	1989	Karl Litten Desert Classic	(England) Mark James	Lost to birdie on first extra hole

=== PGA Tour of Australasia wins (5) ===
No.	Date	Tournament	Winning score	Margin of victory	Runner(s)-up
1	10 Dec 1995	AMP Air New Zealand Open	−8 (65-67-68-72=272)	3 strokes	(United States) Scott Hoch
2	22 Feb 1998	Canon Challenge	−17 (63-73-64-71=271)	9 strokes	(Australia) Paul Gow
3	17 Mar 2002	Holden Clearwater Classic^{1}	−17 (67-69-67-68=271)	5 strokes	(United States) Brad Ott
4	27 Feb 2005	ING New Zealand PGA Championship^{1} (2)	−14 (66-68-71-69=274)	Playoff	(Australia) Steven Bowditch
5	28 Nov 2010	NSW Open	−14 (65-67-66-72=270)	Playoff	(Australia) Peter Cooke, (England) Tom Lewis (a)

^{1}Co-sanctioned by the Nationwide Tour

PGA Tour of Australasia playoff record (2–2)

No.	Year	Tournament	Opponent(s)	Result
1	1989	Tattersall's Tasmanian Open	(Australia) Ian Stanley	Lost to birdie on first extra hole
2	1997	Ericsson Masters	(Australia) Peter Lonard	Lost to par on second extra hole
3	2005	ING New Zealand PGA Championship	(Australia) Steven Bowditch	Won with birdie on first extra hole
4	2010	NSW Open	(Australia) Peter Cooke, (England) Tom Lewis (a)	Won with par on third extra hole Cooke eliminated by par on second hole

=== PGA of Australia Legends Tour wins (1) ===
- 2016 Pymble Legends Pro-Am

== Results in major championships ==
Tournament	1991	1992	1993	1994	1995	1996	1997	1998	1999	2000	2001	2002	2003	2004
U.S. Open						T67						CUT		
The Open Championship	T38	T68			T55	CUT	T7	T24	T24		CUT	T8	CUT	CUT
PGA Championship									CUT	CUT		CUT		

Note: O'Malley never played in the Masters Tournament.

Top 10
Did not play

CUT = missed the half-way cut
"T" = tied

=== Summary ===
Tournament	Wins	2nd	3rd	Top-5	Top-10	Top-25	Events	Cuts made
Masters Tournament	0	0	0	0	0	0	0	0
U.S. Open	0	0	0	0	0	0	2	1
The Open Championship	0	0	0	0	2	4	11	7
PGA Championship	0	0	0	0	0	0	3	0
Totals	0	0	0	0	2	4	16	8

- Most consecutive cuts made – 4 (1991 Open Championship – 1996 U.S. Open)
- Longest streak of top-10s – 1 (twice)

== Results in World Golf Championships ==
Tournament	2002	2003
Match Play	R32	
Championship	T57	T44
Invitational		

Did not play

QF, R16, R32, R64 = Round in which player lost in match play
"T" = Tied

== Team appearances ==
Amateur

- Eisenhower Trophy (representing Australia): 1986
- Sloan Morpeth Trophy (representing Australia): 1986 (winners)
- Australian Men's Interstate Teams Matches (representing New South Wales): 1985 (winners), 1986

Professional

- World Cup (representing Australia): 1992, 1998, 2000
- Alfred Dunhill Cup (representing Australia): 1999, 2000
