= Daniel Summerhays =

American professional golfer (born 1983)

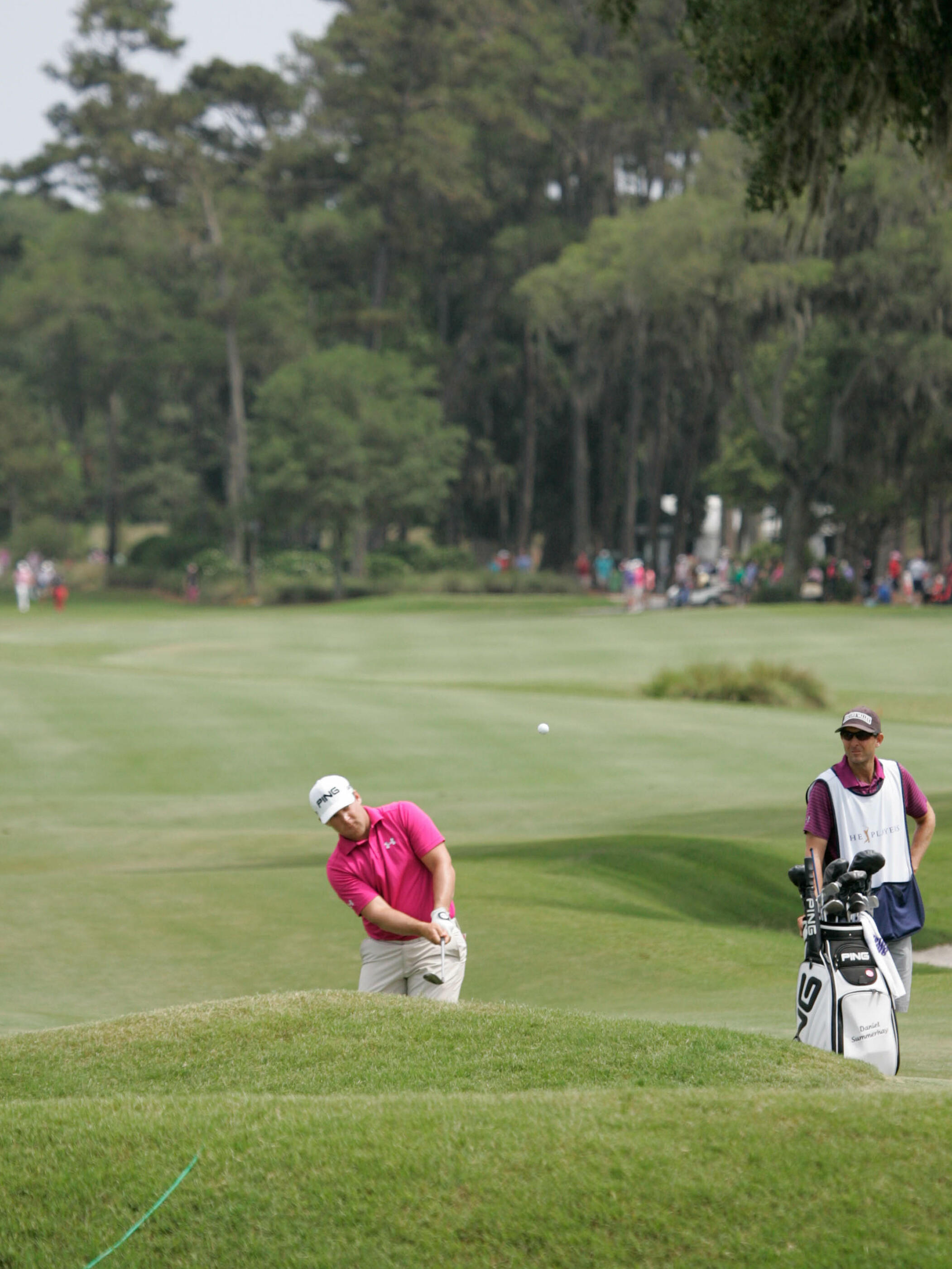
- Summerhays at the 2014 Players Championship

Personal information
- Nationality: United States
- Born: December 2, 1983 (age 42) Farmington, Utah, U.S.
- Height: 5 ft 8 in (1.73 m)
- Weight: 185 lb (84 kg; 13.2 st)

Career
- Sport: Golf
- College: Brigham Young University
- Turned professional: 2007
- Current tour: Korn Ferry Tour
- Former tour: PGA Tour
- Professional wins: 1
- Highest ranking: 53 (July 31, 2016)

Number of wins by tour
- Korn Ferry Tour: 1

Best results in major championships
- Masters Tournament: T46: 2017
- PGA Championship: 3rd: 2016
- U.S. Open: T8: 2016
- The Open Championship: T59: 2016

Daniel Summerhays (born December 2, 1983) is an American professional golfer. His brother Boyd Summerhays played on the Canadian Tour as well as the PGA Tour, and is currently the coach of the PGA Tour's Tony Finau. He is the nephew of Champions Tour player Bruce Summerhays and cousin of former LPGA Tour golfer Carrie Roberts and her brothers Joe Summerhays and Bruce Summerhays Jr., who are both PGA Club Professionals.

In June 2020, Summerhays announced that he was ending his professional golf play, to teach and be the golf coach at Davis High School in Kaysville, Utah, from which he had graduated.

== Amateur career ==
Summerhays was born in Farmington, Utah. He attended Brigham Young University for three years where he was a first-team All-American as a Junior. He won the Utah State Amateur Championship in 2000 and 2001 while he was still in high school. He became the first amateur to win a Nationwide Tour event on July 15, 2007. After winning the Nationwide Children's Hospital Invitational he immediately turned professional and joined the Nationwide Tour. Summerhays would have made $108,000 by winning the Nationwide Children's Hospital Invitational but he did not get any prize money because he was an amateur when he entered the tournament. He decided to forgo his senior year at BYU to turn pro. His victory earned him exempt status on tour through the 2008 season.

== Professional career ==
=== Nationwide Tour ===
Summerhays began playing on the Nationwide Tour full-time two weeks after winning the Nationwide Children's Hospital Invitational. In 2007, he played in 12 events and made 10 cuts while recording a top ten finish and four top 25 finishes. He earned $46,926 and finished 113th on the money list. 2008 was Summerhays first full year on tour. He made 16 of 28 cuts while recording four top tens and 10 top 25s. His best performances came at the Preferred Health Systems Wichita Open where he finished in a tie for second. He earned $177,845 and finished 35th on the money list. Summerhays struggled in 2009, making only 12 of 26 cuts while recording two top-10 finishes. He earned $70,540 and finished 81st on the money list. Summerhays had a breakthrough year in 2010, recording seven top-10 finishes including three runner-up finishes while earning $391,742 en route to a fifth-place finish on the money list, good enough for a PGA Tour card for 2011.

=== PGA Tour ===
Summerhays struggled during his rookie year on Tour, making only 8 cuts in 29 events. He finished 171st on the money list and had to go through qualifying school to earn his card for 2012. Summerhays began to find success in 2012. In February at the Mayakoba Golf Classic he finished in a tie for fifth and two weeks later, he finished in a tie for seventh at the Puerto Rico Open. He recorded his best PGA Tour finish to date in June at the Memorial Tournament, finishing in a tie for fourth. In July he lost a sudden-death playoff to Woody Austin at the Sanderson Farms Championship.

In 2016, Summerhays earned an entry into the U.S. Open by being fourth alternate, after going through sectional qualifying, he would finish the tournament T-8 to earn an exemption into the 2017 U.S. Open. Later in the year, at the PGA Championship, Summerhays finished in solo 3rd after birdieing six out of his last 10 holes in the final round. His finish earned him an invitation into the 2017 Masters Tournament and the 2017 PGA Championship.

== Amateur wins ==
- 2000 Utah State Amateur Championship
- 2001 Utah State Amateur Championship
- 2007 Sahalee Players Championship

== Professional wins (1) ==
=== Korn Ferry Tour wins (1) ===
No.	Date	Tournament	Winning score	Margin of victory	Runners-up
1	Jul 15, 2007	Nationwide Children's Hospital Invitational (as an amateur)	−6 (68-69-72-69=278)	2 strokes	(United States) Chad Collins, (United States) Chris Nallen

Korn Ferry Tour playoff record (0–1)

No.	Year	Tournament	Opponents	Result
1	2020	Utah Championship	(United States) Paul Haley II, (United States) Kyle Jones	Jones won with birdie on second extra hole Summerhays eliminated by par on first hole

== Playoff record ==
PGA Tour playoff record (0–1)

No.	Year	Tournament	Opponents	Result
1	2013	Sanderson Farms Championship	(United States) Woody Austin, (United States) Cameron Beckman	Austin won with birdie on first extra hole

== Results in major championships ==
Tournament	2010	2011	2012	2013	2014	2015	2016	2017
Masters Tournament								T46
U.S. Open	CUT					T27	T8	65
The Open Championship							T59	
PGA Championship					T33		3	T71

Top 10
Did not play

CUT = missed the half-way cut
"T" indicates a tie for a place

=== Summary ===
Tournament	Wins	2nd	3rd	Top-5	Top-10	Top-25	Events	Cuts made
Masters Tournament	0	0	0	0	0	0	1	1
U.S. Open	0	0	0	0	1	1	4	3
The Open Championship	0	0	0	0	0	0	1	1
PGA Championship	0	0	1	1	1	1	3	3
Totals	0	0	1	1	2	2	9	8

- Most consecutive cuts made – 8 (2014 PGA − 2017 PGA, current)
- Longest streak of top-10s – 1 (twice)

== Results in The Players Championship ==
Tournament	2013	2014	2015	2016	2017
The Players Championship	T26	T23	CUT	T23	T53

CUT = missed the halfway cut
"T" indicates a tie for a place

== Results in World Golf Championships ==
Tournament	2015
Championship	
Match Play	
Invitational	
Champions	T44

Did not play

"T" = Tied

== See also ==
- 2010 Nationwide Tour graduates
- 2011 PGA Tour Qualifying School graduates
