= 2014 Players Championship =

Tournament information
- Dates: May 8–11, 2014
- Location: Ponte Vedra Beach, Florida; 30.198°N 81.394°W
- Courses: TPC Sawgrass, Stadium Course
- Tour: PGA Tour

Statistics
- Par: 72
- Length: 7,215 yards (6,597 m)
- Field: 144 players, 82 after cut (71 after second cut)
- Cut: 144 (Even), 218 (+2)
- Prize fund: $10.0 million
- Winner's share: $1.80 million

Champion
- (Germany) Martin Kaymer
- 275 (−13)

Location map
- Location in the United States Location in Florida

The 2014 Players Championship was a golf tournament in Florida on the PGA Tour, held May 8–11 at TPC Sawgrass in Ponte Vedra Beach, southeast of Jacksonville. It was the 41st Players Championship.

Martin Kaymer opened with a 63, led after each round, and won his first Players, one stroke ahead of runner-up Jim Furyk. It was the first to feature an eight-figure purse, with a winner's share of $1.8 million.

With defending champion and world number one Tiger Woods out of competition due to back surgery in late March, four entered this Players Championship with an opportunity to ascend to the top of the world rankings. World number two Adam Scott needed a 16th-place finish, third-ranked Henrik Stenson a top-six finish, number four Bubba Watson a solo runner-up, and fifth-ranked Matt Kuchar a win. They finished at T38, T34, T48, and T17, respectively, and Woods remained number one.

Due to 82 players making the halfway cut (top 70 and ties), a second cut was initiated after the third round.

This was the first year for the new playoff format, a three-hole aggregate beginning on the 16th hole, which was not necessary. After a 90-minute rain delay late in the final round, Kaymer finished with a par in near-darkness. If he had bogeyed the final hole, the playoff would have begun on Monday morning.

Kaymer was the fourth European to win the Players, following Sandy Lyle, Sergio García, and Henrik Stenson. A month later he won the U.S. Open at Pinehurst and became the fourth to win the Players and a major in the same calendar year, joining Jack Nicklaus (1978, Open), Hal Sutton (1983, PGA), and Woods (2001, Masters).

== Venue ==
This was the 33rd Players Championship held at the TPC at Sawgrass Stadium Course and it remained at 7,215 yards (6,597 m).

=== Course layout ===
The 2014 Players Championship
Tee	Rating/Slope	1	2	3	4	5	6	7	8	9	Out	10	11	12	13	14	15	16	17	18	In	Total
Yards	76.8 / 155	423	532	177	384	471	393	442	237	583	3,642	424	558	358	181	481	449	523	137	462	3,573	7,215
Par		4	5	3	4	4	4	4	3	5	36	4	5	4	3	4	4	5	3	4	36	72

== Field ==
The field consisted of 144 players meeting the following criteria:

1. Winners of PGA Tour events since last Players

Woody Austin, Bae Sang-moon (2), Jonas Blixt (2,8), Steven Bowditch (2), Jason Dufner (2,4,8), Ken Duke (2), Harris English (2,8,12), Matt Every (2,8,12), Bill Haas (2,7,8), Chesson Hadley, Russell Henley (2,8), J. B. Holmes (3), Dustin Johnson (2,6,8,12), Zach Johnson (2,8,12), Matt Jones (2,8), Chris Kirk (2,12), Matt Kuchar (2,5,6,8,12), Phil Mickelson (2,4,8), Ryan Moore (2,8), Noh Seung-yul, Patrick Reed (2,6,8,12), Justin Rose (2,4,6,8), Adam Scott (2,4,6,8), John Senden (2), Webb Simpson (2,4,8), Brandt Snedeker (2,7,8), Jordan Spieth (2,8,12), Kevin Stadler (2), Scott Stallings (2), Henrik Stenson (2,5,7,8), Jimmy Walker (2,8,12), Bubba Watson (2,4,8,12), Boo Weekley (2), Gary Woodland (2,8)

- Jason Day (2,6,8) and Tiger Woods (2,5,6,8) did not play.

2. Top 125 from previous season's FedEx Cup points list

Stuart Appleby, Aaron Baddeley, Charlie Beljan, Jason Bohn, Keegan Bradley (4,6,8), Scott Brown, Ángel Cabrera, Roberto Castro, Greg Chalmers, Kevin Chappell, K. J. Choi (5), Stewart Cink (4), Tim Clark (5), Erik Compton, Ben Crane, Brian Davis, Brendon de Jonge, Graham DeLaet (8), Luke Donald (8), James Driscoll, Ernie Els (4,8), Derek Ernst, Martin Flores, Rickie Fowler (8), Jim Furyk (8), Sergio García (8), Robert Garrigus, Brian Gay, Lucas Glover (4), Luke Guthrie, James Hahn, Brian Harman, David Hearn, J. J. Henry, Justin Hicks, Charley Hoffman, Morgan Hoffmann, Billy Horschel, Charles Howell III, John Huh, Freddie Jacobson, Martin Kaymer (4), Jerry Kelly, Jason Kokrak, Martin Laird, Lee Dong-hwan, Richard H. Lee, Scott Langley, Marc Leishman, Justin Leonard, David Lingmerth, Jeff Maggert, Hunter Mahan (6,8), Graeme McDowell (4,8), William McGirt, Rory McIlroy (4,8), George McNeill, John Merrick, Bryce Molder, Geoff Ogilvy, Jeff Overton, Ryan Palmer, Pat Perez, Carl Pettersson, D. A. Points, Ted Potter Jr., Ian Poulter (6,8), John Rollins, Andrés Romero, Rory Sabbatini, Charl Schwartzel (4,8), Kyle Stanley, Brendan Steele, Kevin Streelman (8), Steve Stricker (8), Chris Stroud, Brian Stuard, Daniel Summerhays, Josh Teater, Michael Thompson, Nicholas Thompson, Cameron Tringale, Bo Van Pelt, Camilo Villegas, Johnson Wagner, Nick Watney, Lee Westwood (8), Charlie Wi, Mark Wilson

- Bob Estes, David Lynn, Scott Piercy, and Chez Reavie did not play.

3. Top 125 from current season - Medical Extension

Briny Baird, Jonathan Byrd, Retief Goosen, Kevin Na, Shawn Stefani

4. Major champions from the past five years

Darren Clarke, Louis Oosthuizen (8), Yang Yong-eun

5. Players Championship winners from the past five years

6. WGC winners from the past three years (WGC-HSBC Champions winners from 2011–12 only if PGA Tour members)

7. The Tour Championship winners from the past three years

8. Top 50 from the Official World Golf Ranking

Thomas Bjørn, Jamie Donaldson, Gonzalo Fernández-Castaño, Stephen Gallacher, Thongchai Jaidee, Joost Luiten, Hideki Matsuyama, Francesco Molinari

- Victor Dubuisson and Miguel Ángel Jiménez did not play.

9. Senior Players champion from prior year

Kenny Perry

10. Web.com Tour money leader from prior season

Michael Putnam

11. Money leader during the Web.com Tour Finals

John Peterson

12. Top 10 current year FedEx Cup points leaders

13. Remaining positions and alternates filled through current year FedEx Cup standings

Russell Knox, Will MacKenzie

Tiger Woods (2001, 2013) was recovering from back surgery. This was the third time the defending champion did not compete,
following 1998 (Steve Elkington, sinus surgery) and 1983 (Jerry Pate, neck).

== Round summaries ==
=== First round ===
Thursday, May 8, 2014

Martin Kaymer tied the course record by shooting a nine-under-par 63. His round included nine birdies including seven on the front nine (his second nine), setting the nine-hole record with 29 (−7). Russell Henley was two strokes back and Bae Sang-moon was three back.

Place	Player	Score	To par
1	(Germany) Martin Kaymer	63	−9
2	(United States) Russell Henley	65	−7
3	(South Korea) Bae Sang-moon	66	−6
T4	(Spain) Gonzalo Fernández-Castaño	67	−5
T4	(Spain) Sergio García	67	−5
T4	(England) Justin Rose	67	−5
T4	(United States) Jordan Spieth	67	−5
T4	(United States) Scott Stallings	67	−5
T4	(United States) Brian Stuard	67	−5
T4	(England) Lee Westwood	67	−5
T4	(United States) Gary Woodland	67	−5

=== Second round ===
Friday, May 9, 2014

Place	Player	Score	To par
1	(Germany) Martin Kaymer	63-69=132	−12
2	(United States) Jordan Spieth	67-66=133	−11
3	(United States) Russell Henley	65-71=136	−8
T4	(United States) Jim Furyk	70-68=138	−6
T4	(Spain) Sergio García	67-71=138	−6
T4	(England) Justin Rose	67-71=138	−6
T4	(England) Lee Westwood	67-71=138	−6
T4	(United States) Gary Woodland	67-71=138	−6
T9	(South Korea) Bae Sang-moon	66-73=139	−5
T9	(United States) Scott Brown	68-71=139	−5
T9	(England) Brian Davis	72-67=139	−5
T9	(United States) Bill Haas	68-71=139	−5
T9	(Australia) Matt Jones	70-69=139	−5
T9	(United States) George McNeill	71-68=139	−5
T9	(United States) Kevin Na	70-69=139	−5
T9	(Australia) Geoff Ogilvy	69-70=139	−5
T9	(South Africa) Charl Schwartzel	72-67=139	−5
T9	(Australia) John Senden	70-69=139	−5

=== Third round ===
Saturday, May 10, 2014

Place	Player	Score	To par
T1	(Germany) Martin Kaymer	63-69-72=204	−12
T1	(United States) Jordan Spieth	67-66-71=204	−12
T3	(Spain) Sergio García	67-71-69=207	−9
T3	(Australia) John Senden	70-69-68=207	−9
T5	(Australia) Matt Jones	70-69-69=208	−8
T5	(United States) George McNeill	71-68-69=208	−8
T5	(United States) Gary Woodland	67-71-70=208	−8
T8	(Canada) David Hearn	70-71-68=209	−7
T8	(Italy) Francesco Molinari	72-70-67=209	−7
T8	(England) Justin Rose	67-71-71=209	−7
T8	(England) Lee Westwood	67-71-71=209	−7

=== Final round ===
Sunday, May 11, 2014

Champion
(c) = past champion

Place	Player	Score	To par	Money ($)
1	(Germany) Martin Kaymer	63-69-72-71=275	−13	1,800,000
2	(United States) Jim Furyk	70-68-72-66=276	−12	1,080,000
3	(Spain) Sergio García (c)	67-71-69-70=277	−11	680,000
T4	(England) Justin Rose	67-71-71-69=278	−10	440,000
T4	(United States) Jordan Spieth	67-66-71-74=278	−10	440,000
T6	(Canada) David Hearn	70-71-68-70=279	−9	313,000
T6	(Northern Ireland) Rory McIlroy	70-74-69-66=279	−9	313,000
T6	(Italy) Francesco Molinari	72-70-67-70=279	−9	313,000
T6	(United States) Jimmy Walker	75-68-71-65=279	−9	313,000
T6	(England) Lee Westwood	67-71-71-70=279	−9	313,000

Leaderboard below the top 10
Place	Player	Score	To par	Money ($)
T11	(England) Brian Davis	72-67-73-68=280	−8	240,000
T11	(United States) Gary Woodland	67-71-70-72=280	−8	240,000
T13	(South Korea) K. J. Choi (c)	74-70-72-65=281	−7	187,500
T13	(United States) Chris Kirk	71-73-70-67=281	−7	187,500
T13	(United States) George McNeill	71-68-69-73=281	−7	187,500
T13	(United States) Steve Stricker	71-70-71-69=281	−7	187,500
T17	(United States) Russell Henley	65-71-80-66=282	−6	135,333
T17	(United States) Justin Hicks	73-70-71-68=282	−6	135,333
T17	(United States) Morgan Hoffmann	71-70-70-71=282	−6	135,333
T17	(Australia) Matt Jones	70-69-69-74=282	−6	135,333
T17	(United States) Matt Kuchar (c)	71-71-69-71=282	−6	135,333
T17	(United States) Brian Stuard	67-76-69-70=282	−6	135,333
T23	(Australia) Marc Leishman	70-72-74-67=283	−5	96,000
T23	(Japan) Hideki Matsuyama	70-71-72-70=283	−5	96,000
T23	(United States) Daniel Summerhays	74-68-69-72=283	−5	96,000
T26	(United States) Kevin Chappell	72-68-75-69=284	−4	69,500
T26	(United States) Bill Haas	68-71-72-73=284	−4	69,500
T26	(United States) Billy Horschel	72-70-75-67=284	−4	69,500
T26	(United States) Zach Johnson	69-71-72-72=284	−4	69,500
T26	(United States) Ryan Moore	70-74-67-73=284	−4	69,500
T26	(Australia) John Senden	70-69-68-77=284	−4	69,500
T26	(United States) Brendan Steele	69-73-75-67=284	−4	69,500
T26	(United States) Bo Van Pelt	71-70-70-73=284	−4	69,500
T34	(United States) Erik Compton	72-70-74-69=285	−3	52,750
T34	(Scotland) Russell Knox	72-72-73-68=285	−3	52,750
T34	(United States) Scott Langley	71-72-72-70=285	−3	52,750
T34	(Sweden) Henrik Stenson (c)	71-70-70-74=285	−3	52,750
T38	(Argentina) Ángel Cabrera	70-74-71-71=286	−2	38,000
T38	(United States) Stewart Cink	70-70-70-76=286	−2	38,000
T38	(England) Luke Donald	73-69-75-69=286	−2	38,000
T38	(Wales) Jamie Donaldson	74-67-74-71=286	−2	38,000
T38	(Spain) Gonzalo Fernández-Castaño	67-77-72-70=286	−2	38,000
T38	(United States) Charley Hoffman	77-67-71-71=286	−2	38,000
T38	(United States) Justin Leonard (c)	68-73-70-75=286	−2	38,000
T38	(United States) Kevin Na	70-69-76-71=286	−2	38,000
T38	(South Africa) Rory Sabbatini	71-73-69-73=286	−2	38,000
T38	(Australia) Adam Scott (c)	77-67-69-73=286	−2	38,000
T48	(United States) Charlie Beljan	73-69-73-72=287	−1	24,072
T48	(Australia) Steven Bowditch	72-72-71-72=287	−1	24,072
T48	(United States) Jason Dufner	69-74-72-72=287	−1	24,072
T48	(United States) Martin Flores	70-71-74-72=287	−1	24,072
T48	(South Africa) Retief Goosen	72-70-75-70=287	−1	24,072
T48	(United States) J. J. Henry	74-70-72-71=287	−1	24,072
T48	(United States) Jeff Maggert	72-71-74-70=287	−1	24,072
T48	(United States) Pat Perez	68-73-75-71=287	−1	24,072
T48	(South Africa) Charl Schwartzel	72-67-77-71=287	−1	24,072
T48	(United States) Brandt Snedeker	75-69-67-76=287	−1	24,072
T48	(United States) Bubba Watson	69-72-70-76=287	−1	24,072
T59	(United States) Dustin Johnson	68-74-72-74=288	E	22,000
T59	(United States) Ryan Palmer	71-73-71-73=288	E	22,000
T59	(United States) John Peterson	73-69-72-74=288	E	22,000
T62	(United States) Scott Brown	68-71-77-73=289	+1	21,500
T62	(Northern Ireland) Graeme McDowell	69-71-77-72=289	+1	21,500
64	(Sweden) Freddie Jacobson	70-70-75-75=290	+2	21,200
T65	(United States) Richard H. Lee	71-71-76-73=291	+3	20,800
T65	(England) Ian Poulter	74-69-72-76=291	+3	20,800
T65	(United States) Scott Stallings	67-77-71-76=291	+3	20,800
68	(South Korea) Bae Sang-moon	66-73-79-74=292	+4	20,400
69	(Australia) Geoff Ogilvy	69-70-76-78=293	+5	20,200
70	(Zimbabwe) Brendon de Jonge	69-74-75-76=294	+6	20,000
71	(United States) Kyle Stanley	73-69-76-77=295	+7	19,800
T72	(South Africa) Ernie Els	68-76-75=219	+3	19,400
T72	(United States) John Huh	69-72-78=219	+3	19,400
T72	(South Korea) Noh Seung-yul	76-68-75=219	+3	19,400
T75	(Sweden) Jonas Blixt	71-72-77=220	+4	18,900
T75	(United States) John Merrick	72-71-77=220	+4	18,900
T77	(Australia) Stuart Appleby	71-73-77=221	+5	18,400
T77	(United States) Rickie Fowler	71-72-78=221	+5	18,400
T77	(United States) John Rollins	73-71-77=221	+5	18,400
T80	(Netherlands) Joost Luiten	68-72-82=222	+6	17,900
T80	(United States) Chris Stroud	76-67-79=222	+6	17,900
82	(United States) Jeff Overton	70-72-83=225	+9	17,600
CUT	(United States) Keegan Bradley	72-73=145	+1	
CUT	(United States) Derek Ernst	76-69=145	+1	
CUT	(United States) Lucas Glover	75-70=145	+1	
CUT	(United States) Chesson Hadley	73-72=145	+1	
CUT	(United States) Charles Howell III	71-74=145	+1	
CUT	(United States) Will MacKenzie	73-72=145	+1	
CUT	(United States) Phil Mickelson (c)	75-70=145	+1	
CUT	(Sweden) Carl Pettersson	74-71=145	+1	
CUT	(United States) Ted Potter Jr.	73-72=145	+1	
CUT	(United States) Johnson Wagner	73-72=145	+1	
CUT	(South Korea) Charlie Wi	76-69=145	+1	
CUT	(United States) Jason Bohn	74-72=146	+2	
CUT	(United States) Jonathan Byrd	72-74=146	+2	
CUT	(United States) Roberto Castro	72-74=146	+2	
CUT	(Canada) Graham DeLaet	69-77=146	+2	
CUT	(United States) Ken Duke	72-74=146	+2	
CUT	(United States) Robert Garrigus	75-71=146	+2	
CUT	(United States) James Hahn	70-76=146	+2	
CUT	(United States) Brian Harman	74-72=146	+2	
CUT	(Thailand) Thongchai Jaidee	73-73=146	+2	
CUT	(United States) Jerry Kelly	78-68=146	+2	
CUT	(Scotland) Martin Laird	76-70=146	+2	
CUT	(United States) Kevin Stadler	72-74=146	+2	
CUT	(Colombia) Camilo Villegas	70-76=146	+2	
CUT	(United States) Luke Guthrie	73-74=147	+3	
CUT	(United States) Kenny Perry	77-70=147	+3	
CUT	(United States) Josh Teater	71-76=147	+3	
CUT	(United States) Michael Thompson	71-76=147	+3	
CUT	(United States) Cameron Tringale	77-70=147	+3	
CUT	(Australia) Aaron Baddeley	73-75=148	+4	
CUT	(United States) Harris English	73-75=148	+4	
CUT	(Scotland) Stephen Gallacher	70-78=148	+4	
CUT	(Sweden) David Lingmerth	71-77=148	+4	
CUT	(United States) Bryce Molder	77-71=148	+4	
CUT	(United States) Michael Putnam	75-73=148	+4	
CUT	(United States) Webb Simpson	75-73=148	+4	
CUT	(United States) Kevin Streelman	69-79=148	+4	
CUT	(United States) Boo Weekley	75-73=148	+4	
CUT	(Denmark) Thomas Bjørn	73-76=149	+5	
CUT	(Australia) Greg Chalmers	74-75=149	+5	
CUT	(Northern Ireland) Darren Clarke	76-73=149	+5	
CUT	(United States) Brian Gay	70-79=149	+5	
CUT	(United States) J. B. Holmes	76-73=149	+5	
CUT	(United States) Shawn Stefani	75-74=149	+5	
CUT	(South Korea) Yang Yong-eun	75-74=149	+5	
CUT	(United States) Jason Kokrak	70-80=150	+6	
CUT	(Argentina) Andrés Romero	76-74=150	+6	
CUT	(United States) Nick Watney	71-79=150	+6	
CUT	(United States) Ben Crane	76-75=151	+7	
CUT	(United States) Hunter Mahan	73-78=151	+7	
CUT	(United States) D. A. Points	75-76=151	+7	
CUT	(United States) Nicholas Thompson	77-74=151	+7	
CUT	(South Africa) Tim Clark (c)	71-81=152	+8	
CUT	(South Africa) Louis Oosthuizen	77-75=152	+8	
CUT	(United States) James Driscoll	75-78=153	+9	
CUT	(United States) Matt Every	76-77=153	+9	
CUT	(United States) William McGirt	72-81=153	+9	
CUT	(United States) Patrick Reed	74-79=153	+9	
CUT	(United States) Mark Wilson	79-74=153	+9	
CUT	(United States) Woody Austin	78-76=154	+10	
WD	(United States) Briny Baird	77	+5	
WD	(South Korea) Lee Dong-hwan	78	+6	

==== Scorecard ====
Final round

Hole	1	2	3	4	5	6	7	8	9	10	11	12	13	14	15	16	17	18
Par	4	5	3	4	4	4	4	3	5	4	5	4	3	4	4	5	3	4
(Germany) Kaymer	−12	−13	−13	−13	−13	−13	−13	−13	−14	−14	−15	−15	−15	−15	−13	−13	−13	−13
(United States) Furyk	−7	−8	−8	−9	−9	−10	−10	−10	−10	−11	−11	−11	−11	−11	−11	−12	−12	−12
(Spain) García	−9	−10	−10	−10	−10	−10	−10	−10	−11	−11	−10	−11	−11	−10	−10	−10	−10	−11
(England) Rose	−7	−8	−8	−9	−9	−9	−9	−9	−10	−9	−8	−7	−7	−7	−8	−8	−9	−10
(United States) Spieth	−12	−13	−13	−14	−13	−13	−13	−12	−12	−11	−11	−11	−11	−10	−9	−10	−10	−10
(Canada) Hearn	−7	−8	−8	−8	−8	−9	−9	−9	−10	−10	−10	−10	−10	−9	−9	−9	−9	−9
(Northern Ireland) McIlroy	−2	−2	−2	−2	−2	−3	−3	−4	−4	−5	−6	−7	−7	−6	−6	−7	−8	−9
(Italy) Molinari	−8	−9	−9	−9	−9	−10	−9	−9	−9	−10	−11	−11	−11	−10	−10	−10	−10	−9
(United States) Walker	−2	−3	−4	−5	−5	−4	−5	−5	−6	−6	−8	−8	−9	−9	−9	−10	−10	−9
(England) Westwood	−7	−7	−7	−7	−7	−7	−8	−7	−8	−8	−9	−9	−9	−10	−9	−9	−9	−9

Cumulative tournament scores, relative to par

Eagle	Birdie	Bogey	Double bogey
