= 2013 Players Championship =

Tournament information
- Dates: May 9–12, 2013
- Location: Ponte Vedra Beach, Florida; 30.198°N 81.394°W
- Courses: TPC Sawgrass, Stadium Course
- Tour: PGA Tour

Statistics
- Par: 72
- Length: 7,215 yards (6,597 m)
- Field: 145 players, 77 after cut
- Cut: 144 (Even)
- Prize fund: $9.5 million
- Winner's share: $1.71 million

Champion
- (United States) Tiger Woods
- 275 (−13)

Location map
- Location in the United States Location in Florida

The 2013 Players Championship was a golf tournament in Florida on the PGA Tour, held May 9–12 at TPC Sawgrass in Ponte Vedra Beach, southeast of Jacksonville. It was the 40th Players Championship.

Tiger Woods won his second Players Championship, two strokes ahead of runners-up David Lingmerth, Jeff Maggert, and Kevin Streelman. Woods previously won twelve years earlier in 2001, after winning the previous three majors and the next for his Tiger Slam.

Defending champion Matt Kuchar finished thirteen strokes back at even par, tied for 48th place.

== Venue ==
This was the 32nd Players Championship held at the TPC at Sawgrass Stadium Course and it remained at 7,215 yards (6,597 m).

=== Course layout ===
The 2013 Players Championship
Tee	Rating/Slope	1	2	3	4	5	6	7	8	9	Out	10	11	12	13	14	15	16	17	18	In	Total
Yards	n/a	423	532	177	384	471	393	442	237	583	3,642	424	558	358	181	481	449	523	137	462	3,573	7,215
Par		4	5	3	4	4	4	4	3	5	36	4	5	4	3	4	4	5	3	4	36	72

== Field ==
The field consisted of 144 players meeting criteria 1–12, plus the winner of the 2012 Senior Players Championship.

1. Winners of PGA Tour events since last Players

Charlie Beljan (3), Jonas Blixt (3), Keegan Bradley (2,3,5,7,9), Scott Brown, Jason Dufner (2,3,9), Ernie Els (2,3,5,9), Derek Ernst, Tommy Gainey (3), Sergio García (2,3,6,9), Brian Gay (3), Russell Henley, J. J. Henry (3), Billy Horschel (9,11), Dustin Johnson (2,3,9,11), Zach Johnson (2,3,9), Matt Kuchar (2,3,6,7,9,11), Martin Laird (3), Marc Leishman (3), Graeme McDowell (3,5,9,11), Rory McIlroy (2,3,5,9), John Merrick (3), Phil Mickelson (2,3,5,9,11), Ryan Moore (2,3,9), Scott Piercy (2,3,9), D. A. Points (3,9,11), Ted Potter Jr. (3), Adam Scott (2,3,5,7,9,11), Webb Simpson (2,3,5,9), Brandt Snedeker (2,3,8,9,11), Scott Stallings (3), Kevin Streelman (3,11), Michael Thompson (3,9), Nick Watney (2,3,7,9), Tiger Woods (2,3,5,7,9,11)

2. Top 30 from previous season's FedEx Cup points list

Luke Donald (3,7,9), Rickie Fowler (3,9), Jim Furyk (3,8,9), Robert Garrigus (3,9), John Huh (3), Hunter Mahan (3,7,9), Louis Oosthuizen (3,5,9), Carl Pettersson (3,9), Justin Rose (3,7,9), John Senden (3), Steve Stricker (3,9), Bo Van Pelt (3,9), Bubba Watson (3,5,9), Lee Westwood (3,9)

3. Top 125 from previous season's PGA Tour money list

Robert Allenby, Aaron Baddeley, Bae Sang-moon, Ricky Barnes, Jason Bohn, Jonathan Byrd, Chad Campbell, Roberto Castro, Bud Cauley, Greg Chalmers, Kevin Chappell, K. J. Choi (6), Tim Clark (6,9), Will Claxton, Ben Crane, Ben Curtis, Brian Davis, Jason Day (9), Brendon de Jonge, Graham DeLaet, James Driscoll, Ken Duke, Harris English, Matt Every, Martin Flores, Tom Gillis, Bill Haas (8,9), Brian Harman, Pádraig Harrington (5), David Hearn, Tim Herron, Charley Hoffman, Charles Howell III, Freddie Jacobson (9), Chris Kirk, Colt Knost, Jason Kokrak, Davis Love III, Jeff Maggert, David Mathis, Troy Matteson, William McGirt, George McNeill, Bryce Molder, Noh Seung-yul, Geoff Ogilvy, Sean O'Hair, Jeff Overton, Greg Owen, Ryan Palmer, Pat Perez, Ian Poulter (7,9), Dicky Pride, John Rollins, Andrés Romero, Rory Sabbatini, Charl Schwartzel (5,9), Vijay Singh, Kevin Stadler, Kyle Stanley, Brendan Steele, Henrik Stenson (6,9), Chris Stroud, Daniel Summerhays, Josh Teater, David Toms, Cameron Tringale, Johnson Wagner, Jimmy Walker, Boo Weekley, Charlie Wi, Mark Wilson

- Blake Adams, Bob Estes, Harrison Frazar, J. B. Holmes, Troy Kelly, Spencer Levin, John Mallinger, Kevin Na, and Jhonattan Vegas did not play.

4. Top 125 from current season - Medical Extension

Retief Goosen

5. Major champions from the past five years

Ángel Cabrera, Stewart Cink, Lucas Glover, Martin Kaymer (9), Yang Yong-eun

- Darren Clarke did not play.

6. Players Championship winners from the past five years

7. WGC winners from the past three years (WGC-HSBC Champions winners only if PGA Tour members)

8. The Tour Championship winners from the past three years

9. Top 50 from the Official World Golf Ranking as of April 28

Gonzalo Fernández-Castaño, Branden Grace, Peter Hanson, Francesco Molinari, Thorbjørn Olesen

- George Coetzee, Nicolas Colsaerts, Jamie Donaldson, Paul Lawrie, and Richard Sterne did not play.

10. Web.com Tour money leader from prior season

Casey Wittenberg

11. Top 10 current year FedEx Cup points leaders as of April 28

12. Field filled to 144 through current year FedEx Cup standings as of April 28

Erik Compton, Luke Guthrie, James Hahn, Matt Jones, Jerry Kelly, Scott Langley, Richard H. Lee, Justin Leonard, David Lingmerth, David Lynn, Brian Stuard, Nicholas Thompson

13. Senior Players champion from prior year (did not count against field of 144)

Joe Daley

== Round summaries ==
=== First round ===
Thursday, May 9, 2013

Playing in his first Players Championship, Roberto Castro tied the course record at 63 (−9) in relatively benign morning conditions. His round, which consisted of seven birdies, one eagle, and no bogeys, tied the record set by Fred Couples (third round) in 1992 and matched by Greg Norman (first round) in 1994. Zach Johnson and Rory McIlroy were three shots back, with six other players, including Tiger Woods, four shots back.

Place	Player	Score	To par
1	(United States) Roberto Castro	63	−9
T2	(United States) Zach Johnson	66	−6
T2	(Northern Ireland) Rory McIlroy	66	−6
T4	(United States) Hunter Mahan	67	−5
T4	(United States) Ryan Palmer	67	−5
T4	(United States) Webb Simpson	67	−5
T4	(United States) Steve Stricker	67	−5
T4	(United States) Casey Wittenberg	67	−5
T4	(United States) Tiger Woods	67	−5
T10	(South Korea) Bae Sang-moon	68	−4
T10	(United States) Jason Bohn	68	−4
T10	(Australia) Greg Chalmers	68	−4
T10	(Spain) Sergio García	68	−4
T10	(Republic of Ireland) Pádraig Harrington	68	−4
T10	(Sweden) David Lingmerth	68	−4
T10	(Sweden) Henrik Stenson	68	−4

=== Second round ===
Friday, May 10, 2013

Unheralded first-round leader Castro fell far back into the pack after a second round 78. The halfway leader was 2008 winner Sergio García after some impressive putting saw him to a 65 and 133 (−11). A stroke back was 2001 winner and world number one Woods, who shot a second straight 67 for a 134, his best 36-hole score at TPC Sawgrass by six strokes. Notables to miss the cut included former winners Phil Mickelson and Tim Clark, and world number four Justin Rose.

Place	Player	Score	To par
1	(Spain) Sergio García	68-65=133	−11
2	(United States) Tiger Woods	67-67=134	−10
T3	(United States) Kevin Chappell	69-66=135	−9
T3	(Sweden) Henrik Stenson	68-67=135	−9
T3	(England) Lee Westwood	69-66=135	−9
T6	(Sweden) David Lingmerth	68-68=136	−8
T6	(United States) Ryan Palmer	67-69=136	−8
T6	(United States) Casey Wittenberg	67-69=136	−8
T9	(United States) Zach Johnson	66-71=137	−7
T9	(United States) Matt Kuchar	71-66=137	−7
T9	(United States) Hunter Mahan	67-70=137	−7
T9	(Australia) Adam Scott	69-68=137	−7

=== Third round ===
Saturday, May 11, 2013

A rain delay on Saturday afternoon left eight players unable to complete their third rounds, with play to be completed Sunday morning. With one hole to play, unheralded rookie David Lingmerth, who had missed five straight cuts since a playoff loss in the early season, led by two from three former winners. 49-year-old Jeff Maggert had earlier shot the round of the day with a 66.

Place	Player	To par	Thru
1	(Sweden) David Lingmerth	−12	17
T2	(Sweden) Henrik Stenson	−10	15
T2	(Spain) Sergio García	−10	14
T2	(United States) Tiger Woods	−10	14
T5	(United States) Jeff Maggert	−9	F
T5	(United States) Casey Wittenberg	−9	17
T5	(United States) Ryan Palmer	−9	16
T8	(England) David Lynn	−8	F
T8	(United States) Hunter Mahan	−8	F
T10	(Australia) Greg Chalmers	−7	F
T10	(Australia) Marc Leishman	−7	F

Sunday, May 12, 2013

A late bogey for Lingmerth, and strong play from the final group, left a three-way tie for the lead on a congested leaderboard at the conclusion of the third round. Lingmerth would play the final round with García, who finished birdie-birdie-par, while co-leader Tiger Woods was one group back, alongside another outsider in former U.S. Amateur runner-up Casey Wittenberg. Ryan Palmer, who had lost a close friend in a traffic accident at the start of the week, was also amongst those one stroke back.

Place	Player	Score	To par
T1	(Spain) Sergio García	68-65-72=205	−11
T1	(Sweden) David Lingmerth	68-68-69=205	−11
T1	(United States) Tiger Woods	67-67-71=205	−11
T4	(United States) Ryan Palmer	67-69-70=206	−10
T4	(Sweden) Henrik Stenson	68-67-71=206	−10
T4	(United States) Casey Wittenberg	67-69-70=206	−10
7	(United States) Jeff Maggert	70-71-66=207	−9
T8	(England) David Lynn	72-68-68=208	−8
T8	(United States) Hunter Mahan	67-70-71=208	−8
T10	(Australia) Greg Chalmers	68-73-68=209	−7
T10	(Australia) Marc Leishman	72-66-71=209	−7
T10	(England) Lee Westwood	69-66-74=209	−7

=== Final round ===
Sunday, May 12, 2013

García and Lingmerth were in the last group, with Woods in the group just ahead. Leading by several shots, Woods double-bogeyed No. 14 with a pulled hook into the water, which brought the field back in play. Woods came back into the lead by making a birdie on No. 16, after a bunker shot ended just a couple feet from the hole. García hit his ball to the center of the No. 16 green and made a two-putt for a birdie, tying Woods for the lead going into No. 17. Lingmerth hit his second shot into the left green side bunker at No. 16, and hit a sand shot to just a few feet; he then converted on his birdie attempt to get one behind the leaders heading into No. 17.

The 17th hole was pivotal, as Woods hit his tee shot to 47 feet (14 m) and two-putted to make par. Lingmerth hit his tee shot to seven feet but did not make the birdie putt, leaving him with a par. García, with a pitching wedge, hit the first tee shot in the water, a few feet short of the island green. On his next attempt, his ball hit the island green surface but bounded back into the water. His third shot hit the center of the green; he ended up with a quadruple-bogey seven that took him out of contention. He took a double-bogey on the final hole to finish six strokes back.

Woods' tee shot at the 18th was a slight draw, to the center of the fairway and the approach shot was within 16 feet (5 m); he two-putted for par and a 70. Lingmerth could have tied Woods with a birdie, but his tee shot with a driver went too long and into the right rough. His approach shot ended up 61 feet (19 m) from the pin and his birdie attempt missed the hole by several inches, ending off the green and he bogeyed. Woods won by two shots, his second win at the event, in his 300th career PGA Tour start.

Champion
(c) = past champion

Place	Player	Score	To par	Money ($)
1	(United States) Tiger Woods (c)	67-67-71-70=275	−13	1,710,000
T2	(Sweden) David Lingmerth	68-68-69-72=277	−11	709,333
T2	(United States) Jeff Maggert	70-71-66-70=277	−11	709,333
T2	(United States) Kevin Streelman	69-70-71-67=277	−11	709,333
T5	(Scotland) Martin Laird	71-67-73-67=278	−10	346,750
T5	(United States) Ryan Palmer	67-69-70-72=278	−10	346,750
T5	(Sweden) Henrik Stenson (c)	68-67-71-72=278	−10	346,750
T8	(United States) Ben Crane	69-71-72-69=281	−7	237,500
T8	(Spain) Sergio García (c)	68-65-72-76=281	−7	237,500
T8	(Australia) Marc Leishman	72-66-71-72=281	−7	237,500
T8	(Northern Ireland) Rory McIlroy	66-72-73-70=281	−7	237,500
T8	(United States) Brandt Snedeker	71-69-71-70=281	−7	237,500
T8	(England) Lee Westwood	69-66-74-72=281	−7	237,500
T8	(United States) Casey Wittenberg	67-69-70-75=281	−7	237,500

Leaderboard below the top 10
Place	Player	Score	To par	Money ($)
T15	(Zimbabwe) Brendon de Jonge	72-69-70-71=282	−6	156,750
T15	(United States) Tim Herron	71-69-74-68=282	−6	156,750
T15	(United States) Webb Simpson	67-71-74-70=282	−6	156,750
T15	(United States) Jimmy Walker	72-71-72-67=282	−6	156,750
T19	(United States) Roberto Castro	63-78-71-71=283	−5	107,214
T19	(Australia) Jason Day	69-75-71-68=283	−5	107,214
T19	(England) Luke Donald	72-69-73-69=283	−5	107,214
T19	(United States) Zach Johnson	66-71-76-70=283	−5	107,214
T19	(United States) Hunter Mahan	67-70-71-75=283	−5	107,214
T19	(South Africa) Louis Oosthuizen	69-75-67-72=283	−5	107,214
T19	(Australia) Adam Scott (c)	69-68-75-71=283	−5	107,214
T26	(Canada) Graham DeLaet	71-70-74-69=284	−4	67,450
T26	(United States) James Driscoll	75-68-70-71=284	−4	67,450
T26	(United States) Matt Every	70-71-71-72=284	−4	67,450
T26	(Canada) David Hearn	72-71-71-70=284	−4	67,450
T26	(England) David Lynn	72-68-68-76=284	−4	67,450
T26	(United States) Jeff Overton	71-70-69-74=284	−4	67,450
T26	(United States) Daniel Summerhays	69-74-69-72=284	−4	67,450
T33	(South Korea) Bae Sang-moon	68-71-75-71=285	−3	52,487
T33	(United States) Harris English	70-71-73-71=285	−3	52,487
T33	(United States) Kyle Stanley	75-68-68-74=285	−3	52,487
T33	(United States) Chris Stroud	73-69-69-74=285	−3	52,487
T37	(Australia) Greg Chalmers	68-73-68-77=286	−2	41,800
T37	(United States) Charley Hoffman	70-74-71-71=286	−2	41,800
T37	(United States) Jerry Kelly	71-68-73-74=286	−2	41,800
T37	(Argentina) Andrés Romero	69-72-71-74=286	−2	41,800
T37	(United States) Steve Stricker	67-71-72-76=286	−2	41,800
T37	(United States) Bubba Watson	73-70-70-73=286	−2	41,800
T43	(United States) Chad Campbell	71-72-74-70=287	−1	31,350
T43	(Germany) Martin Kaymer	73-69-76-69=287	−1	31,350
T43	(United States) William McGirt	70-74-70-73=287	−1	31,350
T43	(United States) Sean O'Hair	70-71-69-77=287	−1	31,350
T43	(Australia) John Senden	73-70-71-73=287	−1	31,350
T48	(South Korea) K. J. Choi (c)	69-73-74-72=288	E	23,614
T48	(South Africa) Branden Grace	73-71-67-77=288	E	23,614
T48	(Sweden) Freddie Jacobson	72-71-71-74=288	E	23,614
T48	(United States) Matt Kuchar (c)	71-66-75-76=288	E	23,614
T48	(United States) Davis Love III (c)	70-72-70-76=288	E	23,614
T48	(United States) D. A. Points	72-70-77-69=288	E	23,614
T48	(United States) Boo Weekley	71-71-73-73=288	E	23,614
T55	(United States) Jason Bohn	68-74-75-72=289	+1	21,280
T55	(Argentina) Ángel Cabrera	74-70-69-76=289	+1	21,280
T55	(United States) Chris Kirk	70-69-75-75=289	+1	21,280
T55	(United States) Justin Leonard (c)	70-74-74-71=289	+1	21,280
T55	(South Africa) Charl Schwartzel	72-71-75-71=289	+1	21,280
T55	(United States) Michael Thompson	69-75-72-73=289	+1	21,280
T55	(South Korea) Charlie Wi	74-70-75-70=289	+1	21,280
T62	(United States) Jason Dufner	71-67-72-80=290	+2	20,235
T62	(United States) James Hahn	70-74-73-73=290	+2	20,235
T62	(United States) Josh Teater	72-72-76-70=290	+2	20,235
T62	(United States) Bo Van Pelt	69-74-79-68=290	+2	20,235
T66	(United States) Charles Howell III	71-67-77-76=291	+3	19,665
T66	(South Korea) Noh Seung-yul	70-74-73-74=291	+3	19,665
T68	(United States) Kevin Chappell	69-66-78-79=292	+4	19,190
T68	(United States) John Huh	70-72-73-77=292	+4	19,190
T68	(Sweden) Carl Pettersson	70-72-75-75=292	+4	19,190
71	(South Africa) Rory Sabbatini	75-68-76-74=293	+5	18,810
T72	(United States) Ricky Barnes	71-71-74-78=294	+6	18,430
T72	(England) Brian Davis	78-66-75-75=294	+6	18,430
T72	(Sweden) Peter Hanson	70-70-72-82=294	+6	18,430
T75	(United States) Ben Curtis	69-72-80-74=295	+7	17,955
T75	(Republic of Ireland) Pádraig Harrington	68-76-75-76=295	+7	17,955
77	(Sweden) Jonas Blixt	69-75-77-76=297	+9	17,670
CUT	(Spain) Gonzalo Fernández-Castaño	75-70=145	+1	
CUT	(United States) Rickie Fowler	73-72=145	+1	
CUT	(United States) Jim Furyk	72-73=145	+1	
CUT	(United States) Robert Garrigus	72-73=145	+1	
CUT	(United States) Russell Henley	69-76=145	+1	
CUT	(United States) Jason Kokrak	69-76=145	+1	
CUT	(United States) Phil Mickelson (c)	72-73=145	+1	
CUT	(Fiji) Vijay Singh	74-71=145	+1	
CUT	(United States) Brendan Steele	74-71=145	+1	
CUT	(United States) Nicholas Thompson	69-76=145	+1	
CUT	(United States) Cameron Tringale	70-75=145	+1	
CUT	(United States) Charlie Beljan	72-74=146	+2	
CUT	(South Africa) Ernie Els	73-73=146	+2	
CUT	(United States) J. J. Henry	74-72=146	+2	
CUT	(Northern Ireland) Graeme McDowell	70-76=146	+2	
CUT	(Italy) Francesco Molinari	74-72=146	+2	
CUT	(England) Ian Poulter	75-71=146	+2	
CUT	(England) Justin Rose	72-74=146	+2	
CUT	(United States) Kevin Stadler	78-68=146	+2	
CUT	(United States) Nick Watney	76-70=146	+2	
CUT	(United States) Keegan Bradley	70-77=147	+3	
CUT	(United States) Ken Duke	71-76=147	+3	
CUT	(United States) Brian Gay	72-75=147	+3	
CUT	(United States) Tom Gillis	77-70=147	+3	
CUT	(United States) Billy Horschel	76-71=147	+3	
CUT	(Australia) Matt Jones	70-77=147	+3	
CUT	(United States) Scott Langley	76-71=147	+3	
CUT	(United States) Scott Piercy	70-77=147	+3	
CUT	(United States) Dicky Pride	73-74=147	+3	
CUT	(United States) Brian Stuard	73-74=147	+3	
CUT	(Australia) Robert Allenby	73-75=148	+4	
CUT	(United States) Scott Brown	74-74=148	+4	
CUT	(South Africa) Tim Clark (c)	72-76=148	+4	
CUT	(United States) Martin Flores	76-72=148	+4	
CUT	(United States) Bill Haas	75-73=148	+4	
CUT	(United States) Bryce Molder	74-74=148	+4	
CUT	(United States) Mark Wilson	74-74=148	+4	
CUT	(United States) Jonathan Byrd	74-75=149	+5	
CUT	(United States) Stewart Cink	76-73=149	+5	
CUT	(United States) Lucas Glover	73-76=149	+5	
CUT	(United States) Luke Guthrie	76-73=149	+5	
CUT	(United States) Ryan Moore	76-73=149	+5	
CUT	(Australia) Geoff Ogilvy	75-74=149	+5	
CUT	(Denmark) Thorbjørn Olesen	73-76=149	+5	
CUT	(United States) Pat Perez	74-75=149	+5	
CUT	(United States) Scott Stallings	71-78=149	+5	
CUT	(United States) David Toms	79-70=149	+5	
CUT	(United States) Bud Cauley	78-72=150	+6	
CUT	(United States) Erik Compton	80-70=150	+6	
CUT	(United States) Troy Matteson	75-75=150	+6	
CUT	(United States) Ted Potter Jr.	75-75=150	+6	
CUT	(United States) Will Claxton	77-74=151	+7	
CUT	(United States) John Merrick	74-77=151	+7	
CUT	(United States) Johnson Wagner	77-74=151	+7	
CUT	(United States) Richard H. Lee	76-76=152	+8	
CUT	(United States) David Mathis	78-74=152	+8	
CUT	(United States) George McNeill	70-82=152	+8	
CUT	(United States) Brian Harman	72-81=153	+9	
CUT	(South Korea) Yang Yong-eun	73-81=154	+10	
CUT	(Australia) Aaron Baddeley	78-77=155	+11	
CUT	(United States) Joe Daley	78-77=155	+11	
CUT	(United States) Derek Ernst	74-81=155	+11	
CUT	(United States) Tommy Gainey	75-80=155	+11	
CUT	(United States) John Rollins	77-79=156	+12	
CUT	(England) Greg Owen	76-82=158	+14	
WD	(United States) Dustin Johnson	74	+2	
WD	(United States) Colt Knost	79	+7	
WD	(South Africa) Retief Goosen			

==== Scorecard ====
Final round

Hole	1	2	3	4	5	6	7	8	9	10	11	12	13	14	15	16	17	18
Par	4	5	3	4	4	4	4	3	5	4	5	4	3	4	4	5	3	4
(United States) Woods	−11	−12	−12	−13	−13	−12	−13	−13	−13	−13	−13	−14	−14	−12	−12	−13	−13	−13
(Sweden) Lingmerth	−12	−12	−12	−12	−12	−12	−12	−11	−11	−10	−10	−11	−12	−11	−11	−12	−12	−11
(United States) Maggert	−9	−9	−10	−10	−10	−9	−10	−10	−10	−11	−12	−12	−12	−12	−12	−12	−10	−11
(United States) Streelman	−7	−7	−7	−7	−6	−6	−7	−8	−8	−8	−9	−9	−9	−9	−9	−10	−11	−11
(Scotland) Laird	−5	−6	−6	−7	−8	−8	−8	−8	−9	−9	−9	−9	−10	−10	−10	−11	−11	−10
(United States) Palmer	−10	−11	−11	−10	−9	−8	−8	−8	−8	−9	−10	−11	−11	−11	−11	−10	−10	−10
(Sweden) Stenson	−10	−10	−10	−8	−8	−8	−8	−8	−9	−10	−11	−11	−11	−10	−10	−11	−11	−10
(Spain) García	−11	−11	−11	−10	−11	−11	−11	−11	−11	−10	−11	−11	−12	−12	−12	−13	−9	−7
(United States) Wittenberg	−9	−10	−10	−10	−9	−9	−9	−8	−9	−9	−9	−9	−8	−7	−6	−7	−7	−7

Cumulative tournament scores, relative to par

Birdie	Bogey	Double bogey	Triple bogey+

== Spectators ==
The attendance of 173,946 set a single-week record and the single-day record was broken with 45,281 on Saturday. TV ratings were up 68 percent from 2012; the final-round ratings were the highest for the tournament since 2001.
