= Brandt Snedeker =

American professional golfer (born 1980)

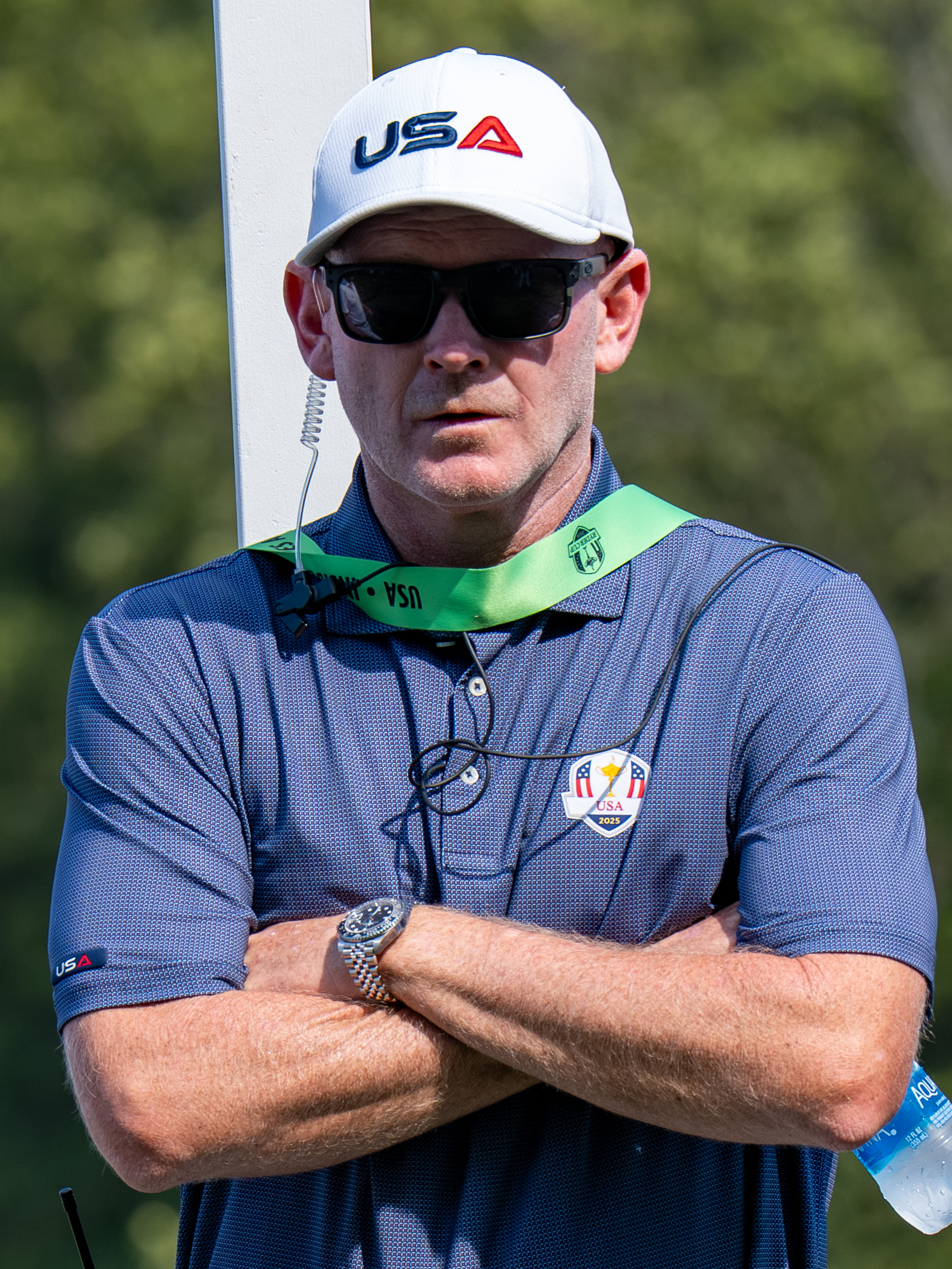
- Snedeker at the 2025 Ryder Cup

Personal information
- Full name: Brandt Newell Snedeker
- Nickname: Sneds
- Nationality: United States
- Born: December 8, 1980 (age 45) Nashville, Tennessee, U.S.
- Height: 6 ft 1 in (1.85 m)
- Weight: 185 lb (84 kg; 13.2 st)
- Spouse: Mandy Snedeker (m. 2008)
- Children: 2

Career
- Sport: Golf
- College: Vanderbilt University
- Turned professional: 2004
- Current tour: PGA Tour
- Professional wins: 14
- Highest ranking: 4 (February 10, 2013)

Number of wins by tour
- PGA Tour: 10
- European Tour: 1
- PGA Tour of Australasia: 1
- Korn Ferry Tour: 2
- Other: 1

Best results in major championships
- Masters Tournament: T3: 2008
- PGA Championship: T12: 2015
- U.S. Open: 8th/T8: 2010, 2015
- The Open Championship: T3: 2012

Achievements and awards
- PGA Tour Rookie of the Year: 2007
- PGA Tour FedEx Cup winner: 2012
- Payne Stewart Award: 2024

Brandt Newell Snedeker (born December 8, 1980) is an American professional golfer who plays on the PGA Tour. He won the 2012 FedEx Cup with a victory in the Tour Championship at East Lake Golf Club, a win that moved him into the top 10 of the Official World Golf Ranking for the first time in his career. In February 2013 after winning the AT&T Pebble Beach National Pro-Am, he moved to a career high of No. 4 in the world. On August 16, 2018, he shot the tenth sub-60 round in the history of the PGA Tour, scoring an opening round 59 at the Wyndham Championship.

== Early life and amateur career ==
Born in Nashville, Tennessee, to parents Larry and Candice Snedeker, Snedeker was introduced to golf by his maternal grandmother, who managed a golf course in West Plains, Missouri. He attended Harding Academy and Montgomery Bell Academy for high school.

Snedeker graduated from Vanderbilt University, where he was initiated into Kappa Alpha Order by the Chi Chapter. He won the U.S. Amateur Public Links in 2003 before turning professional in 2004.

== Professional career ==
=== Nationwide Tour ===
Snedeker played on the Nationwide Tour from 2004 until 2006, when he finished ninth on the tour money list after victories at the Showdown at Somerby and the Permian Basin Charity Golf Classic, earning a PGA Tour spot for 2007. While on the Nationwide Tour, Snedeker earned two wins, two runners-up, 12 tops 10s and earned $549,564.

=== 2007: PGA Tour Rookie of the Year ===
In January 2007, Snedeker shot a 61 in the first round of the Buick Invitational, which tied the course record. He led the tournament by three strokes after 36 holes, but finished in third place with a 74 in the third round. He made eight consecutive cuts starting at the Bob Hope Chrysler Classic in January and ending at the Arnold Palmer Invitational in March, during which he recorded three top-25 finishes. In four tournaments in April, he made two cuts including a finish of T16 at the Verizon Heritage. From May to June, Snedeker made the cut in two of four tournaments, including finishing with a tie for 12th place at the Players Championship.

Snedeker then went on a hot streak starting at the Stanford St. Jude Championship on June 10. He finished in a tie for fifth at that tournament and by doing so surpassed $1 million in earnings on tour in 2007. He finished in a tie for 23rd at the U.S. Open the following week. In early July he recorded two top-10 finishes, including a tie for 10th at the Buick Open. This finish put Snedeker into the top 100 of the Official World Golf Ranking for the first time.

Later in July, Snedeker finished in a tie for 7th at the Canadian Open. A fortnight later he played in the PGA Championship for the first time and finished in a tie for 18th place. Snedeker picked up his first PGA Tour victory the next week at the Wyndham Championship in North Carolina. This win propelled him to a world ranking of 55th. The Wyndham Championship was the last regular season event before the FedEx Cup Playoffs. Snedeker entered the playoffs in 9th place in the point standings. He played in all four playoff events, recording finishes of missed cut, T47, T14 and T29. Snedeker finished in 20th place in the final points standings, which earned him a bonus check of $225,000. Due to his fine debut performance on tour, Snedeker was named the PGA Tour Rookie of the Year for 2007. He entered 29 PGA Tour events in 2007, making 23 cuts. He had one win, a third-place finish, six top-10 finishes and 13 top-25 finishes. He earned $2,836,643 which put him in 17th on the final money list and he finished 2007 ranked 47th in the world rankings.

=== 2008–10: Steady play ===
Snedeker began the 2008 season with a tied for 10th finish at the Mercedes-Benz Championship. He finished tied for 9th at the FBR Open in February and tied for 8th at the PODS Championship in March. Snedeker recorded his first top-10 in a major at the 2008 Masters, where he finished tied for third. He went into the final round in second place, two strokes behind eventual winner Trevor Immelman but Snedeker shot a final round 77. Following his third-place finish at the 2008 Masters Tournament, Snedeker reached a new high of 32nd in the world rankings. Snedeker finished in the top-10 for the second time in a major at the 2008 U.S. Open where he finished tied for 9th. For the rest of the year Snedeker struggled to maintain his early season consistency and did not record another top-10 finish for the season. Snedeker made 19 of 26 cuts on the year and recorded five top-10s, seven top-25s and earned $1,531,442 while finishing 34th in the FedEx Cup standings.

Snedeker struggled in 2009, making only 14 of 26 cuts and failing to make the cut in 9 of his first 12 tournaments. His play improved in the summer as he had two consecutive top-5 finishes, a tie for 5th place at the AT&T National, and a tie for 2nd place at the John Deere Classic. These were followed by two more top-5 finishes at the RBC Canadian Open and the Wyndham Championship. Despite this mid season form he missed the cut in all four of the years majors. One factor contributing to Snedeker's uneven play in 2009 was his health. He missed seven consecutive tournaments in the middle of the season due to a rib injury. Snedeker finished the season 55th on the money list.

Snedeker started the 2010 season well with a top-10 finish at the Bob Hope Classic which he then followed up with a runner-up finish at the Farmers Insurance Open. Snedeker played consistently throughout the early season making eight consecutive cuts through to April. However he then missed five of his next seven cuts and did not record a single top-25 finish until the U.S. Open where Snedeker finished in a tie for 8th place at Pebble Beach Golf Links, his best ever finish in the U.S. Open. For the rest of season he played steadily and recorded two more top-10s at the Wyndham Championship and the end of season playoff event the Deutsche Bank Championship. Snedeker ended the year 48th on the money list.

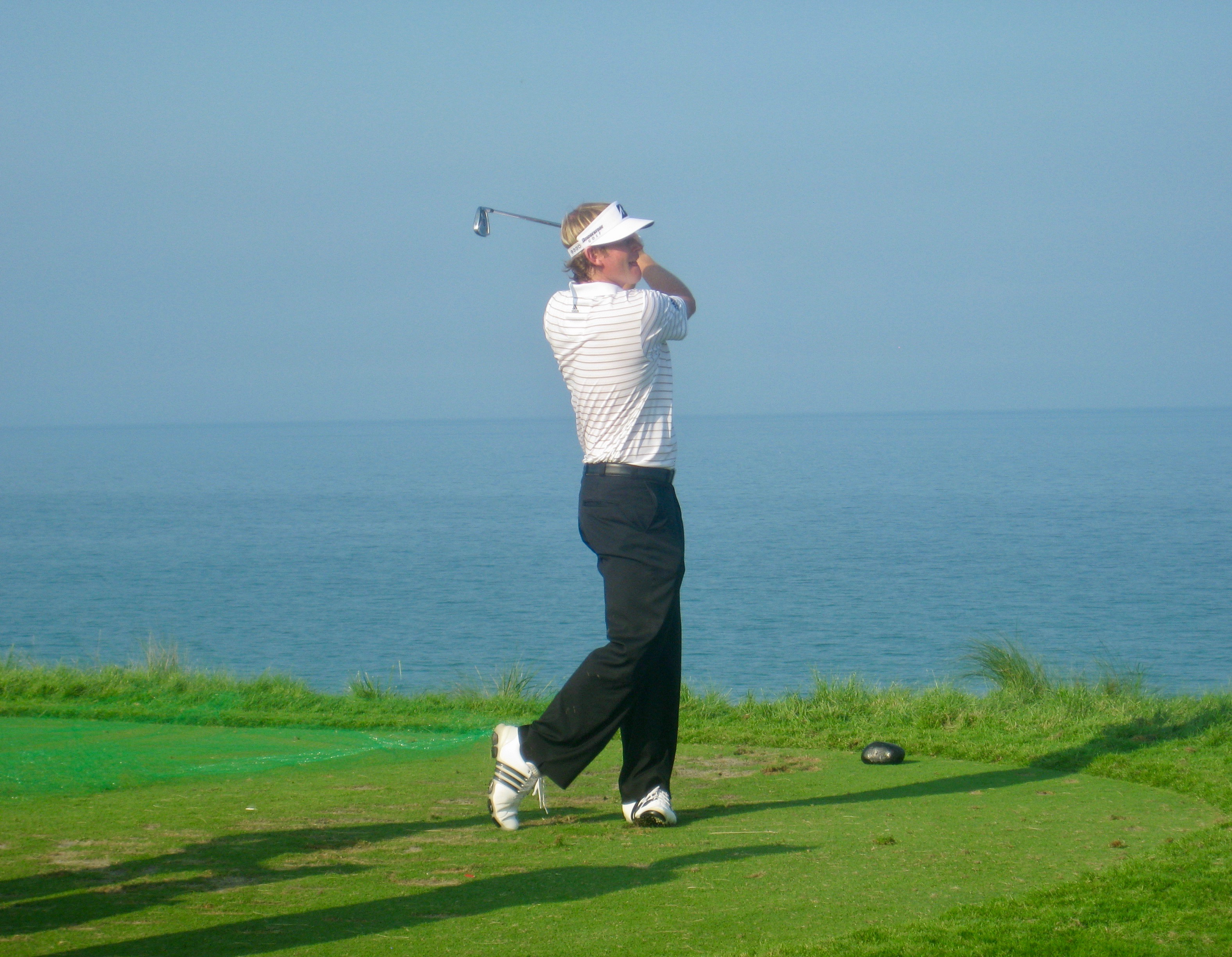
Snedeker at the 2010 PGA Championship

=== 2011: Second win ===
Snedeker had an inconsistent start to the 2011 season missing his first cut at the Bob Hope Classic, but followed that up with two consecutive top-10 finishes at the Farmers Insurance Open and the Waste Management Phoenix Open. This was then followed by a further two missed cuts and a withdrawal from the Honda Classic to attend the birth of his first child. He returned to the tour with a 4th-place finish at the Transitions Championship and then at the year's first major championship, the Masters Tournament finished in a tie for 15th. The following week Snedeker had a chance to win his second PGA Tour title at the Valero Texas Open but made a number of mistakes on the back nine on Sunday which cost him victory, eventually finishing alone in 4th.

Snedeker won his second PGA Tour title at The Heritage, beating Luke Donald in a sudden-death playoff at the third extra hole. Snedeker shot a seven-under-par round of 64 to recover from six shots back on the Sunday to tie Donald. The first two extra holes were parred by both players, but when Donald's par chip missed on the third extra hole, Snedeker sealed the win. This victory took Snedeker to 38th in the world rankings. In November 2011, Snedeker underwent elective surgery on his right hip in order to fix a degenerative issue. This sidelined him for six to eight weeks at the end of year, however Snedeker confirmed he wished to have surgery at this stage in order to be fully fit for the 2012 season. Snedeker finished the season 14th on the money list.

=== 2012: PGA Tour FedEx Cup winner ===
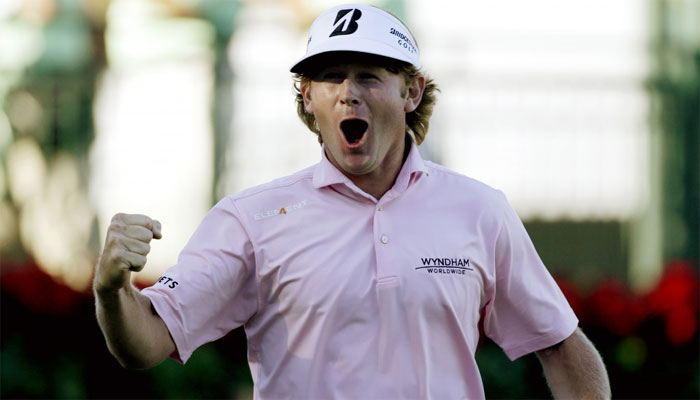
Snedeker at the 2012 Tour Championship

Snedeker won his third PGA Tour title at the Farmers Insurance Open at Torrey Pines. He started the day seven shots behind the leader Kyle Stanley, but after firing a final round 67 he was the leader in the clubhouse while the final group completed its rounds. Stanley had a three stroke lead coming to the final hole, but pitched his third shot into the water resulting in a triple bogey 8 to take the tournament to a playoff. After both players made birdie on the first extra hole, Snedeker prevailed with an up-and-down for par on the second hole after Stanley missed his par putt. Snedeker entered the top 20 in the Official World Golf Ranking after his win. Snedeker had to withdraw from the 2012 U.S. Open due to a rib injury.

During a practice round for the 2012 Open Championship, Snedeker holed a driver from the tee on the 16th hole, a 336-yard par 4. In the championship itself, he scored 66 and 64 in the first two rounds to equal the lowest 36 hole score in the tournament by Nick Faldo in 1992. Snedeker finished with rounds of 73 and 74 to share 3rd place with Tiger Woods at three under par, four shots behind the winner, Ernie Els Snedeker won the 2012 FedEx Cup and the $10 million prize after winning the Tour Championship.

=== 2013: More success ===
Snedeker began his 2013 season with three top three finishes in his first four tournaments, including third at the Hyundai Tournament of Champions, tied for second at the Farmers Insurance Open, and second at the Waste Management Phoenix Open. He then won in his fifth start of the year, the AT&T Pebble Beach National Pro-Am and moved up to a career-high 4th in the Official World Golf Ranking. He pulled out of the WGC-Accenture Match Play Championship the following week, citing a rib injury. He was later diagnosed with "low bone turnover" and began taking daily injections to increase his bone mass. He had top-10 finishes at the Masters Tournament (T-6), the Players Championship (T-8), and the AT&T National (T-8), before winning his second tournament of the season at the RBC Canadian Open. Snedeker spent the entire 2013 PGA Tour season inside the top 10 of the World Golf Rankings.

=== 2014-2015: Decline and comeback ===
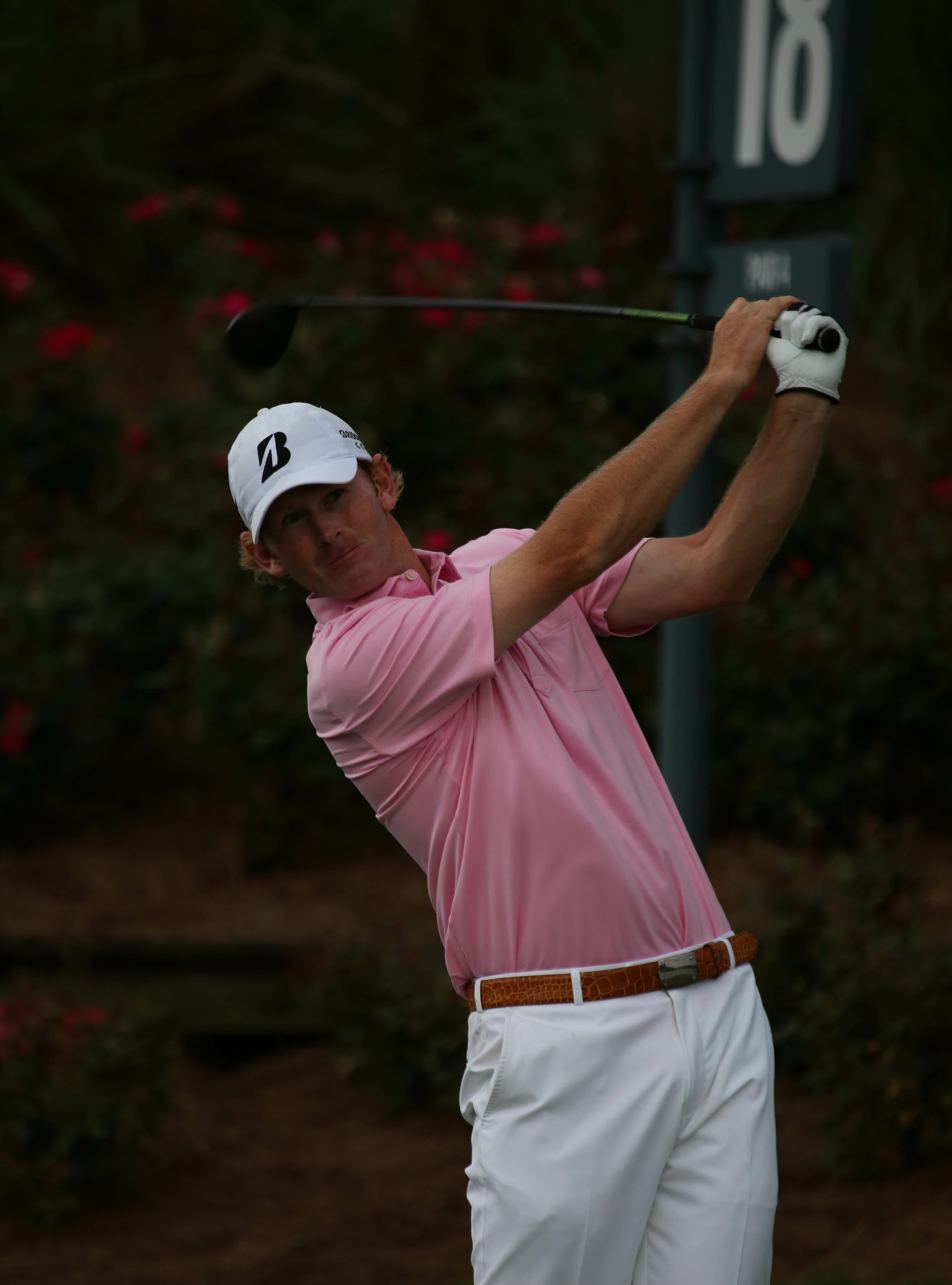
Snedeker at the 2014 Players Championship.

Snedeker had three top-10 finishes on the tour in 2014, with a best finish at the Wyndham Championship where he tied for fifth. He finished 86th on the FedEx Cup points list and 60th on the money list.

After a winless 2014, Snedeker began practicing with coach Butch Harmon. Snedeker won the AT&T Pebble Beach National Pro-Am, with a tournament-setting score of 22 under par, three strokes ahead of Nick Watney. It was the seventh PGA Tour title for Snedeker and the victory lifted him back in the top 50 in the World Ranking.

The 2015 PGA Tour saw Snedeker scoring in the top 10 of events. He scored ties for 10th place at the Shriners Hospitals for Children Open, WGC-HSBC Champions, and the Waste Management Phoenix Open. After missing the cut the 2015 Masters Tournament and The Players Championship, Snedeker, tied for second at the Crowne Plaza Invitational at Colonial, tied for sixth at the AT&T Byron Nelson and finished in eighth place at the U.S. Open at Chambers Bay.

=== Later career ===
Snedeker shot 59 in the first round of the 2018 Wyndham Championship, becoming the 10th player in the history of the PGA Tour to post a sub-60 round in competition. He won the tournament with a score of 259, 21 under par.

Hole	10	11	12	13	14	15	16	17	18	Out	1	2	3	4	5	6	7	8	9	In	Total
Par	4	4	3	4	4	5	3	4	4	35	4	4	3	4	5	4	3	4	4	35	70
Score	5	4	3	3	3	4	2	4	4	32	3	3	2	4	4	2	2	4	3	27	59

In 2025, Snedeker was named captain of the U.S. Presidents Cup played September 22–27, 2026 at Medinah Country Club in Illinois. He played as a member of the team in 2013 and was assistant captain in 2024. He played in the Ryder Cup in 2012 and 2016, and served as a vice captain in the 2025 tournament. He received the 2024 Payne Stewart Award, awarded to a PGA member annually who represents outstanding character and sportsmanship.

In May 2026, Snedeker won the Oneflight Myrtle Beach Classic for his first win since August 2018. He shot a final-round 5-under 66 to come from three shots down at the start of the final round to win his 10th title on the PGA Tour.

== Personal life ==
Snedeker resides in Nashville with his wife, Mandy, and his children, Lily and Austin. His brother, Haymes Snedeker, won The Big Break X: Michigan, and earned a shot at Q school and the PGA Tour.

== Amateur wins ==
- 2003 U.S. Amateur Public Links

== Professional wins (14) ==
=== PGA Tour wins (10) ===
Legend
FedEx Cup playoff events (1)
Other PGA Tour (9)

No.	Date	Tournament	Winning score	To par	Margin of victory	Runner(s)-up
1	Aug 19, 2007	Wyndham Championship	70-67-66-63=266	−22	2 strokes	(United States) Tim Petrovic, (United States) Billy Mayfair, (United States) Jeff Overton
2	Apr 24, 2011	The Heritage	69-67-72-64=272	−12	Playoff	(England) Luke Donald
3	Jan 29, 2012	Farmers Insurance Open	67-64-74-67=272	−16	Playoff	(United States) Kyle Stanley
4	Sep 23, 2012	Tour Championship	68-70-64-68=270	−10	3 strokes	(England) Justin Rose
5	Feb 10, 2013	AT&T Pebble Beach National Pro-Am	66-68-68-65=267	−19	2 strokes	(United States) Chris Kirk
6	Jul 28, 2013	RBC Canadian Open	70-69-63-70=272	−16	3 strokes	(United States) Jason Bohn, (United States) Dustin Johnson, (United States) Matt Kuchar, (United States) William McGirt
7	Feb 15, 2015	AT&T Pebble Beach National Pro-Am (2)	64-67-67-67=265	−22	3 strokes	(United States) Nick Watney
8	Feb 1, 2016	Farmers Insurance Open (2)	73-70-70-69=282	−6	1 stroke	(South Korea) K. J. Choi
9	Aug 19, 2018	Wyndham Championship (2)	59-67-68-65=259	−21	3 strokes	(Taiwan) Pan Cheng-tsung, (United States) Webb Simpson
10	May 10, 2026	Oneflight Myrtle Beach Classic	67-66-67-66=266	−18	1 stroke	(United States) Mark Hubbard

PGA Tour playoff record (2–2)

No.	Year	Tournament	Opponent(s)	Result
1	2011	The Heritage	(England) Luke Donald	Won with par on third extra hole
2	2012	Farmers Insurance Open	(United States) Kyle Stanley	Won with par on second extra hole
3	2016	Sony Open in Hawaii	(Argentina) Fabián Gómez	Lost to birdie on second extra hole
4	2018	Safeway Open	(United States) Ryan Moore, (United States) Kevin Tway	Tway won with birdie on third extra hole Snedeker eliminated by par on first hole

=== European Tour wins (1) ===
No.	Date	Tournament	Winning score	To par	Margin of victory	Runner-up
1	Oct 9, 2016	Fiji International^{1}	69-65-70-68=272	−16	9 strokes	(New Zealand) Michael Hendry

^{1}Co-sanctioned by the PGA Tour of Australasia

=== Nationwide Tour wins (2) ===
No.	Date	Tournament	Winning score	To par	Margin of victory	Runner-up
1	Jul 16, 2006	Scholarship America Showdown	70-67-68-67=272	−16	Playoff	(United States) Jeff Quinney
2	Oct 15, 2006	Permian Basin Charity Golf Classic	66-67-70-69=272	−16	Playoff	(Australia) Aron Price

Nationwide Tour playoff record (2–1)

No.	Year	Tournament	Opponent	Result
1	2006	Chattanooga Classic	(United States) Kyle Reifers	Lost to birdie on first extra hole
2	2006	Scholarship America Showdown	(United States) Jeff Quinney	Won with birdie on third extra hole
3	2006	Permian Basin Charity Golf Classic	(Australia) Aron Price	Won with birdie on first extra hole

=== Other wins (1) ===
No.	Date	Tournament	Winning score	To par	Margin of victory	Runners-up
1	Dec 12, 2015	Franklin Templeton Shootout (with (United States) Jason Dufner)	61-64-61=186	−30	2 strokes	(United States) Harris English and (United States) Matt Kuchar

Other playoff record (0–1)

No.	Year	Tournament	Opponents	Result
1	2008	CVS Caremark Charity Classic (with (United States) Rocco Mediate)	(United States) Billy Andrade and (United States) Davis Love III, (United States) Paul Goydos and (United States) Tim Herron, (Colombia) Camilo Villegas and (United States) Bubba Watson	Villegas/Watson won by 1 stroke in three-hole aggregate playoff

== Results in major championships ==
Results not in chronological order in 2020.

Tournament	2004	2005	2006	2007	2008	2009
Masters Tournament	T41				T3	CUT
U.S. Open		CUT		T23	T9	CUT
The Open Championship					CUT	CUT
PGA Championship				T18	T24	CUT

Tournament	2010	2011	2012	2013	2014	2015	2016	2017	2018
Masters Tournament		T15	T19	T6	T37	CUT	T10	T27	
U.S. Open	T8	T11		T17	T9	8	CUT	T9	T48
The Open Championship		CUT	T3	T11	T58	CUT	T22		CUT
PGA Championship	T39	CUT	CUT	T66	T13	T12	T56		T42

Tournament	2019	2020	2021	2022	2023	2024	2025	2026
Masters Tournament	CUT	59						
PGA Championship	T16	T51						CUT
U.S. Open	77	CUT						
The Open Championship	CUT	NT	T19					

Top 10
Did not play

CUT = missed the half-way cut
"T" = tied
NT = no tournament due to COVID-19 pandemic

=== Summary ===
Tournament	Wins	2nd	3rd	Top-5	Top-10	Top-25	Events	Cuts made
Masters Tournament	0	0	1	1	3	5	12	9
PGA Championship	0	0	0	0	0	5	14	10
U.S. Open	0	0	0	0	5	8	14	10
The Open Championship	0	0	1	1	1	4	11	5
Totals	0	0	2	2	9	22	51	34

- Most consecutive cuts made – 8 (2013 Masters – 2014 PGA)
- Longest streak of top-10s – 2 (2008 Masters – 2008 U.S. Open)

== Results in The Players Championship ==
Tournament	2007	2008	2009
The Players Championship	T12	CUT	

Tournament	2010	2011	2012	2013	2014	2015	2016	2017	2018	2019
The Players Championship	CUT	CUT	CUT	T8	T48	CUT	CUT		CUT	T5

Tournament	2020	2021	2022
The Players Championship	C	CUT	CUT

Top 10
Did not play

CUT = missed the halfway cut
"T" indicates a tie for a place
C = Canceled after the first round due to the COVID-19 pandemic

== Results in World Golf Championships ==
Results not in chronological order prior to 2015.

Tournament	2008	2009	2010	2011	2012	2013	2014	2015	2016	2017	2018	2019	2020
Championship	T48				T45		46	T17	WD	T7			T22
Match Play	R64				R16		R32	T52	R16	T17		T24	NT^{1}
Invitational	T43			T33	T50	T33	T12	T33	T21			T27	T67
Champions					T11	T55	T10				T30		NT^{1}

^{1}Cancelled due to COVID-19 pandemic

Top 10
Did not play

QF, R16, R32, R64 = Round in which player lost in match play
NT = no tournament
"T" = tied
Note that the HSBC Champions did not become a WGC event until 2009.

== PGA Tour career summary ==
Season	Wins	Earnings (US$)	Rank
2004	0	54,215	n/a
2005	0	12,731	n/a
2006	0	0	n/a
2007	1	2,836,643	17
2008	0	1,531,442	59
2009	0	1,483,557	55
2010	0	1,602,690	48
2011	1	3,587,206	14
2012	2	4,989,739	3
2013	2	5,318,087	5
2014	0	1,652,380	60
2015	1	3,698,056	17
2016	1	3,960,142	13
2017	0	1,625,806	67
2018	1	2,448,970	47
2019	0	3,122,936	26
2020	0	896,750	100
Career*	9	38,821,350	22

* As of the 2020 season.

== U.S. national team appearances ==
Amateur

- Palmer Cup: 2003

Professional

- World Cup: 2008
- Ryder Cup: 2012, 2016 (winners)
- Presidents Cup: 2013 (winners), 2026 (non-playing captain, winners)

== See also ==
- 2006 Nationwide Tour graduates
- Lowest rounds of golf
