= Brendon Todd =

American professional golfer (born 1985)

Personal information
- Full name: Brendon Dean Todd
- Nationality: United States
- Born: July 22, 1985 (age 41) Pittsburgh, Pennsylvania, U.S.
- Height: 6 ft 3 in (1.91 m)
- Weight: 180 lb (82 kg; 13 st)
- Spouse: Rachel

Career
- Sport: Golf
- College: University of Georgia
- Turned professional: 2007
- Current tour: PGA Tour
- Former tour: Web.com Tour
- Professional wins: 7
- Highest ranking: 39 (August 30, 2020)(as of October 25, 2026)

Number of wins by tour
- PGA Tour: 3
- Korn Ferry Tour: 2
- Other: 2

Best results in major championships
- Masters Tournament: T46: 2021
- PGA Championship: T17: 2020
- U.S. Open: T17: 2014
- The Open Championship: T12: 2015

Brendon Dean Todd (born July 22, 1985) is an American professional golfer who plays on the PGA Tour.

== Early career ==
Todd played his junior golf at Prestonwood Country Club in Cary, North Carolina and Green Hope High School. He won the NCHSAA 4A individual state championship three times while at Green Hope, winning his freshman, junior, and senior seasons.

Todd attended the University of Georgia, where he was part of the 2005 team that won the National Championship. He was a four-time All-American as a collegiate golfer.

== Professional career ==
Todd joined the Nationwide Tour in 2008. That year he won the Utah Championship, and finished 19th on the money list, earning him a spot on the PGA Tour in 2009.

At the 2009 Athens Regional Foundation Classic on the Nationwide Tour, Todd became the first player on the Tour to ace the same hole twice in the same tournament. On April 16, during the first round, his ace on the 157 yard, par-3, 17th hole, came with a 7-iron. The next day, the ace came with an 8-iron from 147 yards. In his rookie season on the PGA Tour in 2009, he made only 5 of 21 cuts, and did not earn a tour card for 2010.

Todd rejoined the Nationwide Tour in 2010. In 2011, he had a steady season on that tour, and was medalist at the season-ending qualifying school to return to the PGA Tour. In 2012, he was the final person to retain any status on the PGA Tour. His finish of 150th on the PGA Tour's money list meant that he retained conditional status and avoided the second round of Q School. As a member of the 126-150 category on the PGA Tour, Todd also had full Web.com Tour status.

In 2013, Todd won his second Web.com Tour event, the 2013 Stadion Classic at UGA. He finished 20th on the 2013 Web.com Tour regular season money list, earning him a 2014 PGA Tour card.

On May 18, 2014, Todd won his first PGA Tour event, in his 77th start at the HP Byron Nelson Championship. Todd shot a bogey free round of 66 on the final day to finish two strokes ahead of Mike Weir. The victory earned Todd a two-year tour exemption and ensured a first visit to The Masters in 2015. He followed up his win with a T5 at the Crowne Plaza Invitational at Colonial to move inside the Top 60 in the Official World Golf Ranking. Therefore, he earned entry into his first major, the U.S. Open, where he ended 17th.

Todd placed as high as 40th in the world rankings in 2014, but a string of bad finishes and missed cuts cost him his PGA Tour card after the 2015–16 season.

On November 3, 2019, Todd shot a nine-under 62, including seven straight front-nine birdies, to win the Bermuda Championship on the PGA Tour by four shots over 54-hole leader Harry Higgs. "A year ago, I wasn't sure if I was going to keep playing," Todd said after the round. "So it's really special to get this win this soon." In September 2018, Todd had missed the cut in 37 of his last 40 starts. At that point, Todd had dropped outside the top 2000 golfers in the world and failed to get through the second stage of Q School. He was planning on retiring after the season and going into restaurant franchise ownership. "It was basically the ball-striking yips," Todd told Golf Channel in June 2019. "Every time I played, I would hit a 4-iron or a 3-wood 50 yards right, and I knew why but I couldn't really fix it. When the misses get so big that it's an automatic double bogey, narrowing that miss up is hard." On November 18, Todd won the Mayakoba Golf Classic for his second straight win.

On June 27, 2020, Todd fired his career lowest round of 61 during the third round of the Travelers Championship. This allowed Todd to hold the 54-hole lead by two strokes over Dustin Johnson. He shot a 75 in the final round to drop back to a T11 finish.

Todd held the 54-hole lead at the WGC-FedEx St. Jude Invitational by a single stroke after an opening three rounds of 64-64-69. He shot a final round of 75 to finish six shots behind the winner and a T15 finish. This was Todd's best finish in a WGC event.

== Professional wins (7) ==
=== PGA Tour wins (3) ===
No.	Date	Tournament	Winning score	To par	Margin of victory	Runner(s)-up
1	May 18, 2014	HP Byron Nelson Championship	68-64-68-66=266	−14	2 strokes	(Canada) Mike Weir
2	Nov 3, 2019	Bermuda Championship	68-63-67-62=260	−24	4 strokes	(United States) Harry Higgs
3	Nov 18, 2019	Mayakoba Golf Classic	63-68-65-68=264	−20	1 stroke	(United States) Adam Long, (Mexico) Carlos Ortiz, (United States) Vaughn Taylor

=== Web.com Tour wins (2) ===
No.	Date	Tournament	Winning score	To par	Margin of victory	Runner(s)-up
1	Sep 8, 2008	Utah Championship	64-66-65-67=262	−22	6 strokes	(United States) Ryan Hietala, (United States) Jeff Klauk, (Australia) Won Joon Lee, (Australia) Marc Leishman, (United States) Brian Smock, (United States) Kyle Thompson
2	May 4, 2013	Stadion Classic at UGA	66-70-69=205 (Note: Shortened to 54 holes due to weather.)	−8	1 stroke	(New Zealand) Tim Wilkinson

=== NGA Hooters Tour wins (1) ===
No.	Date	Tournament	Winning score	To par	Margin of victory	Runners-up
1	Aug 26, 2007	Dothan Classic	68-65-68-72=273	−15	5 strokes	(United States) Todd Bailey, (United States) Josh Teater

=== Tarheel Tour wins (1) ===
No.	Date	Tournament	Winning score	To par	Margin of victory	Runner-up
1	Aug 3, 2007	Musgrove Mill Classic	67-70-67=204	−12	1 stroke	(United States) Matt Cannon

== Results in major championships ==
Results not in chronological order in 2020.

Tournament	2014	2015	2016	2017	2018
Masters Tournament		CUT			
U.S. Open	T17	CUT			
The Open Championship	T39	T12			
PGA Championship	72	CUT			

Tournament	2019	2020	2021	2022	2023	2024
Masters Tournament		CUT	T46			
PGA Championship		T17	CUT		CUT	78
U.S. Open	CUT	T23	CUT			T67
The Open Championship		NT	CUT		T49	T31

Did not play

CUT = missed the half-way cut
"T" = tied
NT = no tournament due to COVID-19 pandemic

=== Summary ===
Tournament	Wins	2nd	3rd	Top-5	Top-10	Top-25	Events	Cuts made
Masters Tournament	0	0	0	0	0	0	3	1
PGA Championship	0	0	0	0	0	1	6	3
U.S. Open	0	0	0	0	0	2	6	3
The Open Championship	0	0	0	0	0	1	5	4
Totals	0	0	0	0	0	4	20	11

- Most consecutive cuts made – 4 (2023 Open Championship - 2024 Open Championship, current)

== Results in The Players Championship ==
Tournament	2015	2016	2017	2018	2019	2020	2021	2022	2023	2024
The Players Championship	T51	CUT				C	T35	CUT	T27	CUT

Did not play

CUT = missed the halfway cut
"T" indicates a tie for a place
C = Canceled after the first round due to the COVID-19 pandemic

== Results in World Golf Championships ==
Results not in chronological order before 2015.

Tournament	2014	2015	2016	2017	2018	2019	2020	2021
Championship		T23					T37	T18
Match Play		T52					NT^{1}	T42
Invitational	T45	T61					T15	
Champions	T60						NT^{1}	NT^{1}

^{1}Cancelled due to COVID-19 pandemic

Did not play

NT = No tournament
"T" = Tied

== See also ==
- 2008 Nationwide Tour graduates
- 2011 PGA Tour Qualifying School graduates
- 2013 Web.com Tour Finals graduates
- 2019 Korn Ferry Tour Finals graduates
