= 2013 Web.com Tour Finals graduates =

This is a list of players who graduated from the Web.com Tour Finals in 2013. The top 25 players on the Web.com Tour's regular season money list in 2013 earned their PGA Tour card for 2014. The Web.com Tour Finals determined the other 25 players to earn their PGA Tour cards and the priority order of all 50.

== 2013 Web.com Tour Finals ==
| | Regular season money | | FedEx Cup | Finals money | | | Priority rank |
| Player | Rank | Earnings ($) | FedEx Cup | Rank | Earnings ($) | Best finish | Priority rank |
|---|---|---|---|---|---|---|---|
| (United States) Michael Putnam | 1 | 450,184 | | 14 | 65,000 | T7 | Exempt |
| (United States) John Peterson^{†} | 30 | 134,569 | | 1 | 230,000 | T2 | Exempt |
| (United States) Chesson Hadley* | 3 | 305,999 | | 2 | 229,433 | Win | 1 |
| (South Korea) Noh Seung-yul | | | 160 | 3 | 210,125 | Win | 2 |
| (United States) Andrew Svoboda | 25 | 140,540 | 202 | 4 | 192,067 | Win | 3 |
| (South Africa) Trevor Immelman | | | 143 | 5 | 180,000 | Win | 4 |
| (United States) Will MacKenzie | 40 | 107,011 | | 6 | 129,200 | 2nd | 5 |
| (Australia) Scott Gardiner | | | 177 | 7 | 127,533 | T2 | 6 |
| (United States) Edward Loar | 4 | 303,993 | | 8 | 119,200 | 2nd | 7 |
| (United States) Ben Martin | 2 | 399,769 | | 9 | 108,563 | T3 | 8 |
| (United States) Patrick Cantlay* | 29 | 135,105 | | 10 | 108,000 | 2nd | 9 |
| (United States) Brendon Todd | 20 | 152,828 | 145 | 11 | 95,120 | T2 | 10 |
| (Japan) Ryo Ishikawa | | | 141 | 12 | 90,405 | 5th | 11 |
| (Canada) Brad Fritsch | | | 129 | 13 | 66,000 | T2 | 12 |
| (United States) Kevin Kisner | 13 | 177,116 | | 15 | 61,375 | T3 | 13 |
| (United States) Sean O'Hair | | | 170 | 16 | 59,333 | T8 | 14 |
| (United States) Troy Matteson | | | 167 | 17 | 57,250 | T6 | 15 |
| (United States) Bud Cauley | | | 131 | 18 | 55,900 | T5 | 16 |
| (United States) Heath Slocum | 157 | 18,132 | T195 | 19 | 54,000 | T8 | 17 |
| (Scotland) Russell Knox | 36 | 114,860 | 166 | 20 | 53,850 | T6 | 18 |
| (United States) Hudson Swafford* | 61 | 85,209 | | 21 | 53,551 | T7 | 19 |
| (United States) Will Claxton | | | 169 | 22 | 48,125 | T7 | 20 |
| (United States) Brice Garnett* | 14 | 169,785 | | 23 | 48,000 | T8 | 21 |
| (South Africa) Tyrone van Aswegen* | 49 | 96,178 | | 24 | 44,383 | T4 | 22 |
| (United States) Chad Collins | 33 | 129,623 | | 25 | 44,271 | T7 | 23 |
| (United States) Billy Hurley III | 41 | 106,745 | | 26 | 40,233 | T8 | 24 |
| (New Zealand) Danny Lee | 15 | 169,300 | | 27 | 39,853 | T8 | 25 |
| (United States) Jim Herman | 165 | 14,150 | 139 | 28 | 36,891 | T7 | 26 |
| (United States) Joe Durant | 65 | 78,321 | 220 | 29 | 36,158 | T8 | 27 |
| (United States) Troy Merritt | 74 | 68,119 | | 30 | 36,130 | 15 | 28 |
| (United States) Lee Williams | | | 182 | 31 | 35,933 | T8 | 29 |
| (United States) Andrew Loupe* | 70 | 69,014 | | T32 | 34,750 | T6 | 30 |
| (United States) Ricky Barnes | | | 132 | T32 | 34,750 | T6 | 31 |
| (United States) Peter Malnati* | 18 | 158,697 | | 34 | 34,267 | T8 | 32 |
| (United States) Bobby Gates | 129 | 27,834 | 179 | 35 | 33,650 | T7 | 33 |
| (Australia) Bronson La'Cassie* | 6 | 255,629 | | T36 | 32,671 | T7 | 34 |
| (United States) Alex Aragon | 9 | 223,196 | | T36 | 32,671 | T7 | 35 |
| (New Zealand) Tim Wilkinson | 10 | 216,948 | | 39 | 29,592 | T14 | 36 |
| (United States) Jamie Lovemark | 12 | 178,421 | | 43 | 28,933 | T8 | 37 |
| (United States) Wes Roach* | 22 | 145,098 | | 54 | 22,331 | T19 | 38 |
| (Sweden) Daniel Chopra | 21 | 145,290 | | 61 | 19,536 | T29 | 39 |
| (United States) Alex Prugh | 11 | 208,467 | | 66 | 15,117 | T28 | 40 |
| (Argentina) Miguel Ángel Carballo | 23 | 144,376 | | 75 | 11,075 | T37 | 41 |
| (United States) Jim Renner | 17 | 159,165 | | 95 | 7,195 | T41 | 42 |
| (United States) Mark Anderson | 8 | 225,184 | | 96 | 7,163 | T46 | 43 |
| (United States) Kevin Tway* | 5 | 260,541 | | T100 | 6,225 | T52 | 44 |
| (United States) Kevin Foley* | 24 | 144,052 | | 107 | 4,600 | T39 | 45 |
| (United States) Matt Bettencourt | 16 | 162,877 | T195 | 121 | 2,650 | 67th | 46 |
| (United States) Will Wilcox* | 7 | 248,372 | | n/a | 0 | DNP | 47 |
| (Chile) Benjamín Alvarado* | 19 | 157,304 | | n/a | 0 | DNP | 48 |

- *: PGA Tour rookie in 2014
- ^{†}: First-time PGA Tour member in 2014, but ineligible for rookie status due to having played eight or more Tour events in a previous season
- Earned spot in Finals through PGA Tour.
- Indicates whether the player earned his card through the regular season or through the Finals.

== Results on 2013–14 PGA Tour ==
| Player | Starts | Cuts made | Best finish | Money list rank | Earnings ($) | FedEx Cup rank |
|---|---|---|---|---|---|---|
| (United States) Michael Putnam | 30 | 23 | T4 | 116 | 818,799 | 93 |
| (United States) John Peterson^{†} | 25 | 7 | T19 | 179 | 238,230 | 179 |
| (United States) Chesson Hadley* | 29 | 13 | Win | 57 | 1,703,316 | 49 |
| (South Korea) Noh Seung-yul | 27 | 20 | Win | 38 | 2,115,234 | 35 |
| (United States) Andrew Svoboda | 24 | 14 | T2 | 87 | 1,168,073 | 94 |
| (South Africa) Trevor Immelman | 28 | 13 | T10 | 153 | 447,516 | 145 |
| (United States) Will MacKenzie | 27 | 14 | T2 | 51 | 1,853,822 | 65 |
| (Australia) Scott Gardiner | 18 | 6 | T13 | 183 | 209,270 | 187 |
| (United States) Edward Loar | 19 | 3 | T53 | 233 | 29,958 | 233 |
| (United States) Ben Martin | 26 | 13 | 3/T3 (×3) | 66 | 1,482,836 | 76 |
| (United States) Patrick Cantlay* | 5 | 2 | T23 | 212 | 76,131 | 217 |
| (United States) Brendon Todd | 29 | 25 | Win | 18 | 3,396,747 | 27 |
| (Japan) Ryo Ishikawa | 24 | 14 | T2 | 75 | 1,380,579 | 72 |
| (Canada) Brad Fritsch | 18 | 8 | T8 | 140 | 568,391 | 151 |
| (United States) Kevin Kisner | 26 | 17 | T6 | 98 | 954,497 | 104 |
| (United States) Sean O'Hair | 25 | 14 | T10 | 156 | 408,793 | 160 |
| (United States) Troy Matteson | 23 | 7 | T5 | 159 | 387,796 | 165 |
| (United States) Bud Cauley | 19 | 9 | T4 | 129 | 647,886 | 143 |
| (United States) Heath Slocum | 23 | 12 | 4 | 141 | 566,167 | 129 |
| (Scotland) Russell Knox | 26 | 20 | T2 | 67 | 1,513,630 | 40 |
| (United States) Hudson Swafford* | 26 | 11 | T8 | 146 | 513,883 | 146 |
| (United States) Will Claxton | 8 | 4 | T40 | 219 | 56,886 | 213 |
| (United States) Brice Garnett* | 28 | 20 | T7 | 132 | 617,805 | 121 |
| (South Africa) Tyrone van Aswegen* | 25 | 15 | T16 | 151 | 454,856 | 144 |
| (United States) Chad Collins | 28 | 11 | 8 | 157 | 408,434 | 159 |
| (United States) Billy Hurley III | 26 | 17 | T4 | 90 | 1,145,299 | 97 |
| (New Zealand) Danny Lee | 28 | 13 | 2 | 120 | 781,295 | 88 |
| (United States) Jim Herman | 21 | 11 | T26 | 185 | 187,337 | 182 |
| (United States) Joe Durant | 15 | 8 | T11 | 163 | 369,268 | 170 |
| (United States) Troy Merritt | 20 | 10 | 2 | 106 | 882,864 | 101 |
| (United States) Lee Williams | 13 | 5 | T43 | 215 | 66,075 | 204 |
| (United States) Andrew Loupe* | 22 | 10 | T4 | 142 | 563,121 | 137 |
| (United States) Ricky Barnes | 27 | 19 | T8 | 127 | 706,855 | 113 |
| (United States) Peter Malnati* | 18 | 5 | T14 | 176 | 271,326 | 178 |
| (United States) Bobby Gates | 14 | 1 | T80 | 250 | 10,919 | 258 |
| (Australia) Bronson La'Cassie* | 18 | 7 | T21 | 190 | 160,632 | 186 |
| (United States) Alex Aragon | 18 | 2 | 71 | 239 | 21,526 | 252 |
| (New Zealand) Tim Wilkinson | 25 | 18 | T7 | 115 | 824,179 | 119 |
| (United States) Jamie Lovemark | 20 | 13 | T12 | 168 | 305,944 | 172 |
| (United States) Wes Roach* | 22 | 11 | T4 | 152 | 453,616 | 153 |
| (Sweden) Daniel Chopra | 16 | 2 | T58 | 240 | 20,775 | 249 |
| (United States) Alex Prugh | 16 | 4 | T29 | 208 | 90,606 | 206 |
| (Argentina) Miguel Ángel Carballo | 15 | 5 | T17 | 189 | 161,491 | 189 |
| (United States) Jim Renner | 25 | 6 | T2 | 121 | 763,978 | 147 |
| (United States) Mark Anderson | 8 | 3 | T17 | 199 | 122,598 | 212 |
| (United States) Kevin Tway* | 23 | 8 | T26 | 188 | 167,278 | 177 |
| (United States) Kevin Foley* | 15 | 5 | T35 | 209 | 87,738 | 201 |
| (United States) Matt Bettencourt | 14 | 4 | T20 | 205 | 96,825 | 211 |
| (United States) Will Wilcox* | 16 | 10 | T4 | 137 | 586,159 | 142 |
| (Chile) Benjamín Alvarado* | 6 | 1 | T53 | 246 | 13,241 | 240 |

- *: PGA Tour rookie in 2014
- ^{†}: First-time PGA Tour member in 2014, but ineligible for rookie status due to having played eight or more Tour events in a previous season
- Retained his PGA Tour card for 2015: won or finished in the top 125 of the money list or FedEx Cup points list.
- Retained PGA Tour conditional status and qualified for the Web.com Tour Finals: finished between 126 and 150 on FedEx Cup list and qualified for Web.com Tour Finals.
- Failed to retain his PGA Tour card for 2015 but qualified for the Web.com Tour Finals: finished between 150 and 200 on FedEx Cup list.
- Failed to retain his PGA Tour card for 2015 and to qualify for the Web.com Tour Finals: finished outside the top 200 on FedEx Cup list.

Heath Slocum, Bud Cauley, Tyrone van Aswegen, Hudson Swafford, Chad Collins, Sean O'Hair, John Peterson, Jim Herman, and Alex Prugh all regained their cards through the 2014 Web.com Tour Finals; Prugh qualified for the Finals by finishing 36th on the Web.com Tour regular season money list.

== Winners on the PGA Tour in 2014 ==
| No. | Date | Player | Tournament | Winning score | Margin of victory | Runner(s)-up | Payout ($) |
|---|---|---|---|---|---|---|---|
| 1 | Mar 9, 2014 | (United States) Chesson Hadley | Puerto Rico Open | −21 (68-65-67-67=267) | 2 strokes | (New Zealand) Danny Lee | 630,000 |
| 2 | Apr 27, 2014 | (South Korea) Noh Seung-yul | Zurich Classic of New Orleans | −19 (65-68-65-71=269) | 2 strokes | (United States) Robert Streb, (United States) Andrew Svoboda | 1,224,000 |
| 3 | May 18, 2014 | (United States) Brendon Todd | HP Byron Nelson Championship | −14 (68-64-68-66=266) | 2 strokes | (Canada) Mike Weir | 1,242,000 |

== Runners-up on the PGA Tour in 2014 ==
| No. | Date | Player | Tournament | Winner | Winning score | Runner-up score | Payout ($) |
|---|---|---|---|---|---|---|---|
| 1 | Oct 20, 2013 | (Japan) Ryo Ishikawa | Shriners Hospitals for Children Open | (United States) Webb Simpson | −24 (64-63-67-66=260) | −18 (67-66-68-65=266) | 528,000 |
| 2 | Feb 9, 2014 | (United States) Jim Renner | AT&T Pebble Beach National Pro-Am | (United States) Jimmy Walker | −11 (66-69-67-74=276) | −10 (65-73-72-67=277) | 580,800 |
| 3 | Mar 2, 2014 | (Scotland) Russell Knox | Honda Classic | (United States) Russell Henley | −8 (64-68-68-72=272) | −8 (70-63-68-71=272) | 545,600 |
| 4 | Mar 9, 2014 | (New Zealand) Danny Lee | Puerto Rico Open | (United States) Chesson Hadley | −21 (68-65-67-67=267) | −19 (67-68-66-68=269) | 378,000 |
| 5 | Mar 30, 2014 | (United States) Will MacKenzie | Valero Texas Open | (Australia) Steven Bowditch | −8 (69-67-68-76=280) | −7 (69-72-70-70=281) | 545,600 |
| 6 | Apr 27, 2014 | (United States) Andrew Svoboda | Zurich Classic of New Orleans | (South Korea) Noh Seung-yul | −19 (65-68-65-71=269) | −17 (64-68-70-69=271) | 598,400 |
| 7 | Jun 8, 2014 | (United States) Troy Merritt | FedEx St. Jude Classic | (United States) Ben Crane | −10 (63-65-69-73=270) | −9 (67-66-67-71=271) | 626,400 |
