= Bobby Gates =

American professional golfer (born 1985)

Personal information
- Full name: Robert Gates Jr.
- Nationality: United States
- Born: December 31, 1985 (age 40) Gainesville, Florida, U.S.
- Height: 6 ft 6 in (1.98 m)
- Weight: 225 lb (102 kg; 16.1 st)
- Spouse: Lauren Gates

Career
- Sport: Golf
- College: Texas A&M University
- Turned professional: 2008
- Former tours: PGA Tour; PGA Tour of Australasia; Web.com Tour; Canadian Tour; Gateway Tour
- Professional wins: 2

Number of wins by tour
- PGA Tour of Australasia: 1
- Korn Ferry Tour: 1

Best results in major championships
- Masters Tournament: DNP
- PGA Championship: CUT: 2025
- U.S. Open: T40: 2010
- The Open Championship: DNP

Robert Gates Jr. (born December 31, 1985) is an American professional golfer.

== Early life and amateur career ==
In 1985, Gates was born in Gainesville, Florida. He was raised in the city as well. Gates attended F. W. Buchholz High School and in his senior year he led its golf team in scoring average. Gates was named Scholar Athlete of the Year for Alachua County, Florida.

Gates attended Texas A&M University. In 2008, he graduated with a degree in agriculture.

== Career ==
In 2008, Gates turned professional. He played on the Gateway Tour in 2008. He also played on the Canadian Tour in 2009, finishing 22nd on the Order of Merit.

In 2010, Gates joined the Nationwide Tour after finishing T-42 at the 2009 PGA Tour qualifying school. He won in his debut event on Tour, the 2010 Michael Hill New Zealand Open. He finished the year 16th on the money list and earned his 2011 PGA Tour card. He missed retaining his tour card by one spot and $1,431; D. J. Trahan got the 125th and final PGA Tour card for 2012. Gates later regained his Tour Card through Q School. Gates finished outside the top 125 (141st) on the money list in 2012 and earned his 2013 PGA Tour card through Q School. He made only four cuts in 20 events. He played in the Web.com Tour Finals and finished 35th to earn his PGA Tour card for 2014. In 2013–14, he played in only 14 events due to injury, making one cut. He has not played in a PGA Tour event since the 2014 Travelers Championship and has a five-event medical extension available upon his return.

Gates retired from professional golf in 2018 and now teaches at Summit Golf School in The Woodlands, Texas. He qualified for the 2025 PGA Championship and plays out of the Southern Texas section of the PGA.

== Awards and honors ==
In high school, Gates was honored with a Scholar-Athlete of the Year award from Alachua County, Florida.

== Professional wins (2) ==
=== Nationwide Tour wins (1) ===
No.	Date	Tournament	Winning score	Margin of victory	Runner-up
1	Jan 31, 2010	Michael Hill New Zealand Open^{1}	−14 (65-67-68-74=274)	1 stroke	(Australia) Andrew Dodt

^{1}Co-sanctioned by the PGA Tour of Australasia

=== Gateway Tour wins (1) ===
No.	Date	Tournament	Winning score	Margin of victory	Runners-up
1	Apr 9, 2009	DFW Spring 4	−10 (66-70-70=206)	2 strokes	(United States) Jeremy Alcorn, (United States) David Schultz

== Results in major championships ==
Tournament	2010	2011	2012	2013	2014	2015	2016	2017	2018
Masters Tournament									
U.S. Open	T40				CUT				
The Open Championship									
PGA Championship									

Tournament	2019	2020	2021	2022	2023	2024	2025
Masters Tournament							
PGA Championship							CUT
U.S. Open							
The Open Championship		NT					

Did not play

CUT = missed the half-way cut
"T" = tied
NT = No tournament due to COVID-19 pandemic

== Results in World Golf Championships ==
Tournament	2011
Match Play	
Championship	
Invitational	
Champions	WD

Did not play

WD = withdrew

== See also ==
- 2010 Nationwide Tour graduates
- 2011 PGA Tour Qualifying School graduates
- 2012 PGA Tour Qualifying School graduates
- 2013 Web.com Tour Finals graduates
