= Kevin Foley (golfer) =

American professional golfer (born 1987)

Personal information
- Nationality: United States
- Born: May 24, 1987 (age 39) New Brunswick, New Jersey, U.S.
- Height: 6 ft 2 in (1.88 m)
- Weight: 185 lb (84 kg; 13.2 st)

Career
- Sport: Golf
- College: Penn State University
- Turned professional: 2010
- Current tour: Web.com Tour
- Former tour: PGA Tour
- Professional wins: 3

Number of wins by tour
- Korn Ferry Tour: 1
- Other: 2

Best results in major championships
- Masters Tournament: DNP
- PGA Championship: DNP
- U.S. Open: CUT: 2016
- The Open Championship: DNP

Kevin Foley (born May 24, 1987) is an American professional golfer.

== Career ==
Foley was born in New Brunswick, New Jersey. He graduated from Penn State University in 2010 and turned professional.

Foley played on Web.com Tour in 2012 without a tour card. He earned four top-10 finishes and finished 52nd on the money list. In 2013, he won the first event of the season, the Panama Claro Championship. He finished 24th on the 2013 Web.com Tour regular season money list to earn his 2014 PGA Tour card. He ended 201st in the 2014 FedEx Cup, so he lost his PGA Tour card and also missed the Web.com Tour Finals.

== Amateur wins ==
- 2009 Sunnehanna Amateur

== Professional wins (3) ==
=== Web.com Tour wins (1) ===
| No. | Date | Tournament | Winning score | Margin of victory | Runner-up |
|---|---|---|---|---|---|
| 1 | Feb 24, 2013 | Panama Claro Championship | −8 (66-69-70-67=272) | 1 stroke | (Australia) Mathew Goggin |

=== eGolf Professional Tour wins (1) ===
| No. | Date | Tournament | Winning score | Margin of victory | Runner-up |
|---|---|---|---|---|---|
| 1 | Mar 17, 2012 | Pine Needles Classic | −16 (68-65-69-67=269) | 1 stroke | (Zimbabwe) Bruce McDonald |

=== Other wins (1) ===
- 2011 New Jersey State Open

== Results in major championships ==
| Tournament | 2016 |
|---|---|
| U.S. Open | CUT |

CUT = missed the half-way cut
Note: Foley only played in the U.S. Open.

== See also ==
- 2013 Web.com Tour Finals graduates
