= 2011 PGA Tour Qualifying School graduates =

This is a list of the 29 players who earned their 2012 PGA Tour card through Q School in 2011. Note: Roberto Castro and Mark Anderson had already qualified for the PGA Tour by placing in the Top 25 during the 2011 Nationwide Tour season; they did not count among the Top 25 Q school graduates.

| Place | Player | PGA Tour starts | Cuts made | Notes |
|---|---|---|---|---|
| 1 | (United States) Brendon Todd | 21 | 5 | 1 Nationwide Tour win |
| 2 | (United States) Stephen Gangluff | 35 | 16 | 3 Canadian Tour wins |
| T3 | (United States) Bobby Gates | 32 | 13 | 1 Nationwide Tour win, finished 126th on 2011 PGA Tour money list |
| T3 | (South Korea) Noh Seung-yul | 11 | 8 | 1 European Tour win, 2 Asian Tour wins, played in 2011 Royal Trophy, youngest man in Q-school field (20) |
| T5 | (United States) Tommy Biershenk | 3 | 1 | |
| T5 | (Australia) Jarrod Lyle | 94 | 47 | 2 Nationwide Tour wins, survived leukemia as a teenager |
| T5 | (United States) Vaughn Taylor | 228 | 142 | 2 PGA Tour wins, 1 Nationwide Tour win |
| T8 | (United States) Bob Estes | 589 | 410 | 4 PGA Tour wins, runner-up in 2011 Greenbrier Classic |
| T8 | (United States) Brian Harman | 4 | 1 | Played in 2005 and 2009 Walker Cups |
| T8 | (United States) Marco Dawson | 388 | 204 | 1 Nationwide Tour win, second oldest graduate (48) |
| T11 | (South Korea) Bae Sang-moon | 4 | 1 | 3 Japan Golf Tour wins, 3 Asian Tour wins, 2 OneAsia Tour wins, highest ranked player in field (31 in OWGR at time of qualification) |
| T11 | (United States) Kevin Kisner | 24 | 10 | 1 Nationwide Tour win |
| T13 | (United States) Jeff Maggert | 546 | 335 | 3 PGA Tour wins, 2 Nationwide Tour wins, played in 1994 Presidents Cup and 1995, 1997 and 1999 Ryder Cups |
| T13 | (United States) Roberto Castro | 1 | 0 | Already earned card via 2011 Nationwide Tour, improved status |
| T13 | (United States) Charlie Beljan | 2 | 0 | 2002 U.S. Junior Amateur winner, seven Gateway Tour wins, led Gateway Tour in earnings in 2009 |
| T13 | (United States) William McGirt | 34 | 19 | Finished 83rd in 2011 FedEx Cup, but only 141st in PGA Tour money list |
| T13 | (United States) Harris English | 0 | 0 | 1 Nationwide Tour win (as an amateur), played in 2011 Walker Cup |
| T18 | (United States) Patrick Sheehan | 185 | 120 | 2 Nationwide Tour wins |
| T18 | (England) Greg Owen | 142 | 76 | 1 European Tour win, 1 Challenge Tour win |
| T18 | (United States) Scott Dunlap | 184 | 96 | 2 Nationwide Tour wins, 2 Sunshine Tour wins, oldest graduate (48) and second oldest man in the field |
| T18 | (United States) Daniel Summerhays | 30 | 8 | 1 Nationwide Tour win (as an amateur) |
| T18 | (United States) Edward Loar | 10 | 2 | 2 Asian Tour wins, played in 1999 Walker Cup |
| T18 | (United States) Will Claxton | 1 | 1 | Led after all of the first four rounds of Q-school |
| T24 | (United States) Richard H. Lee | 0 | 0 | |
| T24 | (United States) Mark Anderson | 3 | 1 | Already earned card via 2011 Nationwide Tour |
| T24 | (Brazil) Alexandre Rocha | 26 | 12 | 1 Canadian Tour win, 1 Tour de las Americas win, won the European Tour's Q-school in 2006 |
| T27 | (United States) John Huh | 0 | 0 | 1 Korean Tour win |
| T27 | (Australia) Nathan Green | 173 | 115 | 1 PGA Tour win, 1 European Tour win, 2 PGA Tour of Australasia wins, 1 Canadian Tour win |
| T27 | (United States) Colt Knost | 61 | 27 | 2 Nationwide Tour wins, won 2007 U.S. Amateur and U.S. Amateur Public Links, played in 2007 Walker Cup |

- Players in yellow were 2012 PGA Tour rookies.

== 2012 Results ==
| Player | Starts | Cuts made | Best finish | Money list rank | Earnings ($) |
|---|---|---|---|---|---|
| (United States) Brendon Todd | 29 | 11 | T9 | 150 | 474,295 |
| (United States) Stephen Gangluff | 23 | 6 | T64 | 219 | 58,702 |
| (United States) Bobby Gates | 29 | 15 | T8 | 141 | 525,293 |
| (South Korea) Noh Seung-yul* | 28 | 24 | T4 | 49 | 1,629,751 |
| (United States) Tommy Biershenk* | 27 | 10 | T46 | 207 | 107,266 |
| (Australia) Jarrod Lyle | 7 | 6 | T4 | 164 | 363,685 |
| (United States) Vaughn Taylor | 26 | 14 | T11 | 139 | 547,129 |
| (United States) Bob Estes | 23 | 16 | T4 | 99 | 1,009,769 |
| (United States) Brian Harman* | 30 | 21 | T5 | 87 | 1,146,448 |
| (United States) Marco Dawson | 22 | 8 | T52 | 213 | 79,727 |
| (South Korea) Bae Sang-moon* | 25 | 17 | T2 | 83 | 1,165,952 |
| (United States) Kevin Kisner | 24 | 10 | T10 | 168 | 346,216 |
| (United States) Jeff Maggert | 27 | 14 | 5 | 123 | 682,742 |
| (United States) Roberto Castro* | 27 | 19 | T7 | 118 | 755,095 |
| (United States) Charlie Beljan* | 22 | 9 | Win | 63 | 1,373,528 |
| (United States) William McGirt | 30 | 18 | T2 | 74 | 1,228,947 |
| (United States) Harris English* | 27 | 22 | T5 | 79 | 1,186,003 |
| (United States) Patrick Sheehan | 21 | 8 | T32 | 200 | 129,590 |
| (England) Greg Owen | 27 | 18 | T7 | 85 | 1,151,622 |
| (United States) Scott Dunlap | 20 | 9 | T16 | 182 | 230,220 |
| (United States) Daniel Summerhays | 26 | 15 | T4 | 92 | 1,111,522 |
| (United States) Edward Loar* | 23 | 7 | T25 | 210 | 97,947 |
| (United States) Will Claxton* | 28 | 21 | T5 | 117 | 780,969 |
| (United States) Richard H. Lee* | 24 | 12 | T6 | 138 | 547,733 |
| (United States) Mark Anderson* | 25 | 13 | T9 | 155 | 441,019 |
| (Brazil) Alexandre Rocha | 21 | 11 | 2 | 131 | 614,658 |
| (United States) John Huh* | 28 | 22 | Win | 28 | 2,692,113 |
| (Australia) Nathan Green | 22 | 15 | T10 | 163 | 366,651 |
| (United States) Colt Knost | 29 | 11 | 3/T3 | 109 | 848,197 |

*PGA Tour rookie in 2012
T = Tied
Green background indicates the player retained his PGA Tour card for 2013 (won or finished inside the top 125).
Yellow background indicates the player did not retain his PGA Tour card for 2013, but retained conditional status (finished between 126-150).
Red background indicates the player did not retain his PGA Tour card for 2013 (finished outside the top 150).

== Winners on the PGA Tour in 2012 ==
| No. | Date | Winner | Tournament | Winning score | Margin of victory | Runner(s)-up |
|---|---|---|---|---|---|---|
| 1 | Feb 26 | (United States) John Huh | Mayakoba Golf Classic at Riviera Maya-Cancun | −13 (67-70-71-63=271) | Playoff | (Australia) Robert Allenby |
| 2 | Nov 11 | (United States) Charlie Beljan | Children's Miracle Network Classic | −16 (68-64-71-69=272) | 2 strokes | (United States) Robert Garrigus, (United States) Matt Every |

== Runners-up on the PGA Tour in 2012 ==
| No. | Date | Player | Tournament | Winner | Winning score | Runner-up score |
|---|---|---|---|---|---|---|
| 1 | Mar 18 | (South Korea) Bae Sang-moon lost in four-man playoff | Transitions Championship | (England) Luke Donald | −13 (67-68-70-66=271) | −13 (69-66-68-68=271) |
| 2 | Apr 22 | (United States) John Huh | Valero Texas Open | (United States) Ben Curtis | −9 (67-67-73-72=279) | −7 (77-68-67-69=281) |
| 3 | Jul 29 | (United States) William McGirt | RBC Canadian Open | (United States) Scott Piercy | −17 (62-67-67-67=263) | −16 (63-66-66-69=264) |
| 4 | Aug 5 | (Brazil) Alexandre Rocha | Reno-Tahoe Open | (United States) J. J. Henry | 43 (10-12-14-7) | 42 (8-16-9-9) |

== See also ==
- 2011 Nationwide Tour graduates
