= Mark Anderson (golfer) =

American professional golfer (born 1986)

Personal information
- Nationality: United States
- Born: February 14, 1986 (age 40) Annapolis, Maryland, U.S.
- Height: 6 ft 1 in (1.85 m)
- Weight: 180 lb (82 kg; 13 st)

Career
- Sport: Golf
- College: University of South Carolina
- Turned professional: 2009
- Current tour: Korn Ferry Tour
- Former tour: PGA Tour
- Professional wins: 2

Number of wins by tour
- Korn Ferry Tour: 2

Mark Anderson (born February 14, 1986) is an American professional golfer who has played on the Web.com Tour and the PGA Tour.

== Professional career ==
Anderson joined the Web.com Tour in 2010. In his rookie year on Tour he recorded three top-10 finishes. In 2011, he recorded four top-10 finishes and a runner-up finish at the Miccosukee Championship en route to finishing 22nd on the money list, good enough for a PGA Tour card for 2012.

On the PGA Tour in 2012, Anderson failed to make the top 200 in the FedEx Cup standings. He made 13 out of 25 cuts, but only recorded one top-10 finish all season, a T9 at the season finale. He finished 155th on the money list, losing his PGA Tour card.

Anderson returned to the Web.com Tour for the 2013 season. In May 2013, Anderson won his first professional tournament at the BMW Charity Pro-Am. He won by five strokes and set a new scoring record for the event in the process, finishing at 27-under-par for the week. It was his 60th start on the Web.com Tour. He finished eighth on the 2013 Web.com Tour regular season money list to earn his 2014 PGA Tour card.

In 2014, his season was cut short due to injury. He made only 3 cuts in 8 events and finished 212th on the FedEx Cup points list, therefore he lost his PGA Tour card and also missed the Web.com Tour Finals. He had a limited injury exemption for the 2015 PGA Tour.

== Amateur wins ==
- 2003 South Carolina Junior Amateur
- 2008 Players Amateur
- 2009 Master of the Amateurs

== Professional wins (2) ==
=== Korn Ferry Tour wins (2) ===
| No. | Date | Tournament | Winning score | Margin of victory | Runner-up |
|---|---|---|---|---|---|
| 1 | May 19, 2013 | BMW Charity Pro-Am | −27 (63-67-64-65=259) | 5 strokes | (United States) Tom Hoge |
| 2 | Feb 3, 2019 | Country Club de Bogotá Championship | −17 (62-71-66-67=266) | 4 strokes | (United States) Drew Weaver |

== See also ==
- 2011 Nationwide Tour graduates
- 2011 PGA Tour Qualifying School graduates
- 2013 Web.com Tour Finals graduates
- 2016 Web.com Tour Finals graduates
- 2019 Korn Ferry Tour Finals graduates
