= Charlie Beljan =

American professional golfer (born 1984)

Personal information
- Full name: Charlie Benjamin Beljan
- Nationality: United States
- Born: October 10, 1984 (age 42) Mesa, Arizona, U.S.
- Height: 6 ft 4 in (1.93 m)
- Weight: 215 lb (98 kg; 15.4 st)
- Children: 1

Career
- Sport: Golf
- College: University of New Mexico
- Turned professional: 2007
- Former tours: PGA Tour; Web.com Tour; Gateway Tour
- Professional wins: 12
- Highest ranking: 64 (February 17, 2013)

Number of wins by tour
- PGA Tour: 1
- Other: 11

Best results in major championships
- Masters Tournament: DNP
- PGA Championship: CUT: 2013
- U.S. Open: T18: 2015
- The Open Championship: DNP

Achievements and awards
- Gateway Tour money list winner: 2009

Charlie Benjamin Beljan (born October 10, 1984) is an American professional golfer who plays on the PGA Tour.

== Amateur career ==
Beljan was born in Mesa, Arizona. He won the 2002 U.S. Junior Amateur at the Atlanta Athletic Club in Johns Creek, Georgia. He also won the 2006 Arizona Amateur. Beljan played college golf at the University of New Mexico, where he won three times and was an All-American in 2007.

== Professional career ==
After graduating from New Mexico Beljan turned professional in 2007. He played on the Gateway Tour from 2008 to 2011, winning seven times, and he led the money list in 2009. He qualified for the U.S. Open in 2008 and 2009, but missed the cut both times. He earned his 2012 PGA Tour card by finishing in a tie for 13th at 2011 PGA Tour Qualifying School.

Going into the 2012 Children's Miracle Network Hospitals Classic, the final Tour event of the season and the last chance for a Tour card, Beljan was 139th on the Tour's money list with eight cuts made in 21 tournaments. During the second round he suffered a panic attack on the course and needed medical assistance, leaving the course en route to a hospital after the second round. Despite recommendations not to play, Beljan persevered and led or tied for the lead during the third and fourth rounds. Beljan won by two strokes over Robert Garrigus and Matt Every, earning him a two-year exemption. Beljan finished 63rd on the money list. He also earned entry into invitationals reserved for the top-70 money earners, the season-opening Hyundai Tournament of Champions, and an invitation to the 2013 PGA Championship.

The win capped off a season for Beljan that included wrist surgery after Q School, marriage, fatherhood, and an earlier panic attack where he collapsed on an airplane on a flight home after the Reno-Tahoe Open. Beljan was the fourth rookie winner in 2012, after John Huh, Ted Potter Jr., and Jonas Blixt. Beljan nearly earned his second win at the 2013 Northern Trust Open, but made bogey on the second playoff hole.

Beljan had a medical extension on the PGA Tour until the Genesis Open in 2018. After this event, he lost his full membership of the Tour and was limited to Past Champion status for the remainder of the season.

== Amateur wins ==
- 2002 U.S. Junior Amateur
- 2006 Arizona Amateur

== Professional wins (12) ==
=== PGA Tour wins (1) ===
No.	Date	Tournament	Winning score	Margin of victory	Runners-up
1	Nov 11, 2012	Children's Miracle Network Hospitals Classic	−16 (68-64-71-69=272)	2 strokes	(United States) Matt Every, (United States) Robert Garrigus

PGA Tour playoff record (0–1)

No.	Year	Tournament	Opponent	Result
1	2013	Northern Trust Open	(United States) John Merrick	Lost to par on second extra hole

=== Gateway Tour wins (9) ===
No.	Date	Tournament	Winning score	Margin of victory	Runner(s)-up
1	Jul 27, 2007	Desert Summer 7	−15 (67-64-70=201)	1 stroke	(United States) Kevin Streelman
2	Aug 17, 2007	Desert Summer 9	−14 (66-67-67=200)	Playoff	(United States) Brian Kontak
3	Aug 8, 2008	Desert Summer 8	−13 (67-68-68=203)	Playoff	(United States) Eric Meierdierks
4	Feb 5, 2009	Desert Winter 4	−17 (67-68-64=199)	2 strokes	(United States) Brady Stockton
5	Feb 26, 2009	Desert Winter 7	−14 (67-68-67=202)	Playoff	(United States) Brady Stockton
6	Jun 5, 2009	Desert Summer 1	−16 (64-63-67=194)	1 stroke	(United States) Kane Hanson, (United States) Chris Sessler
7	Apr 10, 2010	Winter Series Championship	−13 (68-65-73-69=275)	3 strokes	(United States) Benoit Beisser
8	Apr 8, 2011	Arizona Series 10	−19 (64-67-66=197)	1 stroke	(United States) Eric Meierdierks
9	Apr 22, 2011	Arizona Series 12	−15 (66-64-71=201)	2 strokes	(Australia) Jake Younan-Wise

=== Other wins (2) ===
- 2013 (1) New Mexico Open
- 2019 (1) Arizona Open

== Results in major championships ==
Tournament	2008	2009	2010	2011	2012	2013	2014	2015
Masters Tournament								
U.S. Open	CUT	CUT						T18
The Open Championship								
PGA Championship						CUT		

Did not play

CUT = missed the half-way cut
"T" indicates a tie for a place

== See also ==
- 2011 PGA Tour Qualifying School graduates
