= Will Claxton =

American professional golfer (born 1981)

Personal information
- Full name: Marvin Willis Claxton III
- Nationality: United States
- Born: September 14, 1981 (age 45) Swainsboro, Georgia, U.S.
- Height: 5 ft 10 in (1.78 m)
- Weight: 170 lb (77 kg; 12 st)
- Spouse: Bonnie Carla Burbic Claxton (m. 2009)

Career
- Sport: Golf
- College: Auburn University
- Turned professional: 2005
- Former tours: PGA Tour (2012–2019); Nationwide Tour (2010–11) eGolf Professional Tour (2009); Hooters Tour (2005–08)

Marvin Willis Claxton III (born September 14, 1981) is an American professional golfer.

== Early life ==
Claxton was born and raised in Swainsboro, Georgia, where he helped the Swainsboro High School golf team win four consecutive regional championships during his time there. In his senior year of high school, he was named to the 1999 Polo Golf Junior All-America team.

== Amateur career ==
Claxton attended Auburn University and was a member of the Tigers' 2002 SEC Championship team. During his freshman year, he finished 4th in the SEC Tournament, and 3rd in 2003. Academically, he majored in Economics and graduated in 2005.

== Professional career ==
In 2005, Claxton turned professional. He joined the Hooters Tour in 2005, and was a member until 2008. He was a member of the eGolf Professional Tour in 2009. He was a member of the Nationwide Tour from 2010 to 2011. In 2011, Claxton earned an invitation to the 2011 Transitions Championship, his first career PGA Tour start, where he made the cut and finished T-67 for the event.

In 2011, in his second attempt to earn a PGA Tour card through the Qualifying School, Claxton was in first place after the first four rounds of competition. He remained in the top-25 at the end of the week to earn his first PGA Tour card.

In 2012, his first year on the PGA Tour, Claxton played in 28 tour events, making the cut in 21, and had two top-10 finishes. He advanced to the FedEx Cup playoffs but missed the cut at The Barclays and failed to advance to the Deutsche Bank Championship. With a finish of 120 on the final 2012 PGA Tour money list, Claxton claimed a tour card for 2013.

In 2013, he made only 9 cuts in 24 events. He played in the Web.com Tour Finals and finished 22nd to retain his PGA Tour card for 2014.

In 2013–14, he only played 8 events, making 4 cuts, until he had to retire for the season due to surgery with his last event being the 2014 AT&T Pebble Beach National Pro-Am He has a twelve-event medical extension available upon his return. He returned in June 2018 at the FedEx St. Jude Classic.

His highest finish to date is a T-5 at the 2012 True South Classic.

== Personal life ==
Claxton currently resides in Auburn, Alabama.

== PGA Tour career summary ==
Season	Starts	Cuts made	Wins	2nd	3rd	Top 10	Top 25	Earnings ($)	Money list rank	FedEx Cup points	FedEx Cup standing
2011	1	1	0	0	0	0	0	11,275	n/a	n/a	n/a
2012	28	21	0	0	0	2	7	780,969	120	530	89
2013	24	9	0	0	0	0	1	206,722	182	186	169
2014	8	4	0	0	0	0	0	56,886	219	52	213
Career*	61	35	0	0	0	2	8	1,055,852	454	-	-

* As of the 2016–17 season.

== See also ==
- 2011 PGA Tour Qualifying School graduates
- 2013 Web.com Tour Finals graduates
