= Richard H. Lee (golfer) =

American professional golfer (born 1987)

Personal information
- Nationality: United States
- Born: April 5, 1987 (age 39) Chicago, Illinois, U.S.
- Height: 5 ft 9 in (1.75 m)
- Weight: 170 lb (77 kg; 12 st)
- Spouse: Christine Lee (m. 2005)
- Children: 2

Career
- Sport: Golf
- College: University of Washington
- Turned professional: 2010
- Former tours: PGA Tour; Web.com Tour

Best results in major championships
- Masters Tournament: DNP
- PGA Championship: DNP
- U.S. Open: CUT: 2015, 2019
- The Open Championship: DNP

Richard Lee (born April 5, 1987) is an American professional golfer who has played on the PGA Tour and the Web.com Tour.

== Career ==
Lee turned professional after graduating from the University of Washington in 2010, and missed out by one shot on obtaining a card for the PGA Tour at that winter's qualifying school. The result did entitle him to play on the Nationwide Tour in 2011, where he finished 37th on the money list thanks largely to a runner-up finish at the Mexico Open. Lee returned to the qualifying school that winter and was successful in earning a PGA Tour card for the first time, going five-under-par for his final five holes to qualify with a shot to spare.

Lee's debut season on tour proved a difficult one, finishing well outside the top 125 earners who automatically retain their playing rights. However, he showed signs of late-season form when finishing T6th at the Justin Timberlake Shriners Hospitals for Children Open in October, his best tour finish, and this form continued to a third visit to qualifying school. Lee finished T4 on his return to the event to secure a second year on the main tour.

== Personal life ==
Lee married at the age of 18 to Christine Jang, 19, and became a father the following year; he combined his family life with a college golf career at the University of Washington.

== See also ==
- 2011 PGA Tour Qualifying School graduates
- 2012 PGA Tour Qualifying School graduates
