= Harris English =

American professional golfer (born 1989)

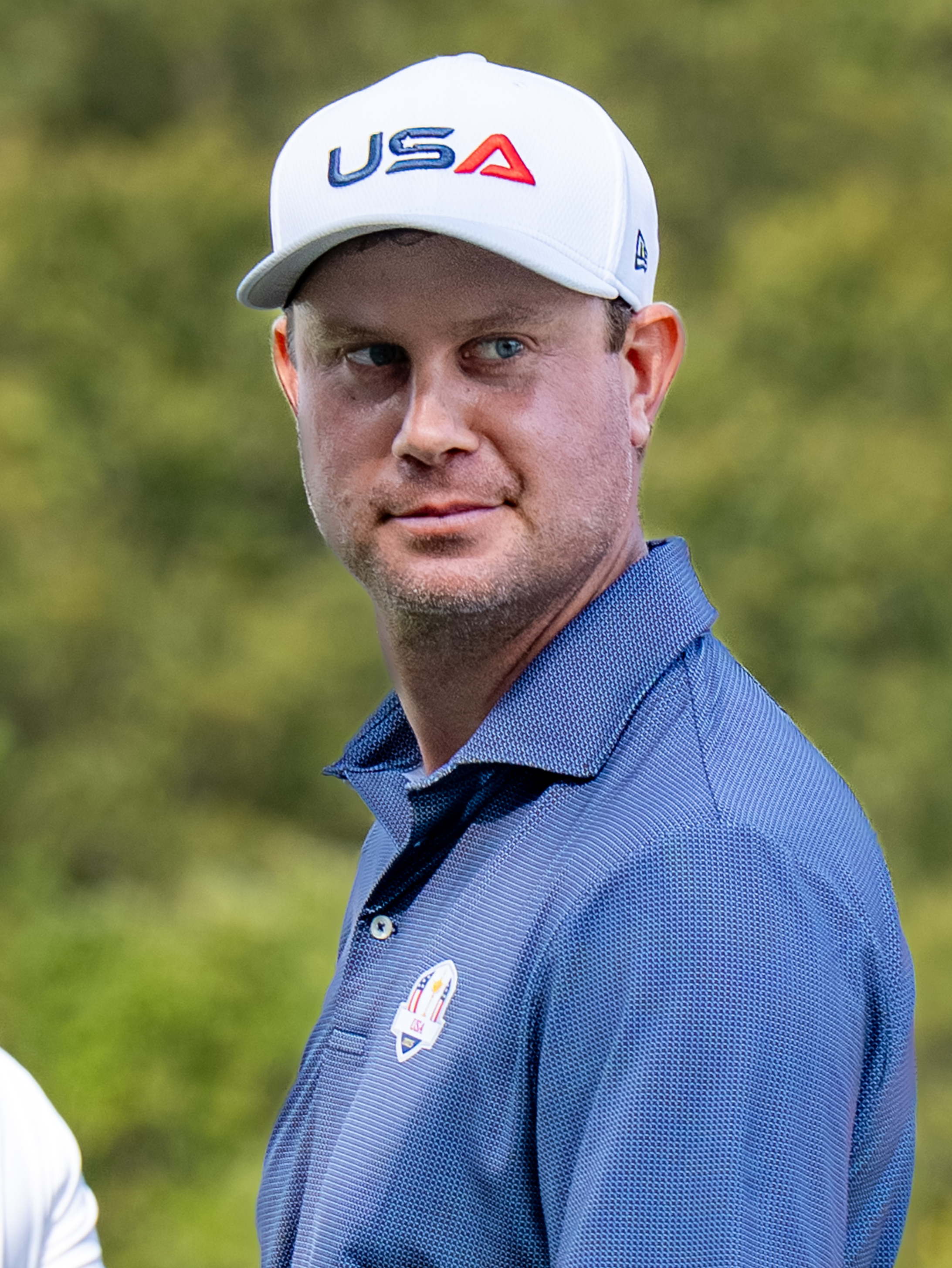
- English at the 2025 Ryder Cup

Personal information
- Nationality: United States
- Born: July 23, 1989 (age 37) Valdosta, Georgia, U.S.
- Height: 6 ft 3 in (1.91 m)
- Weight: 185 lb (84 kg; 13.2 st)
- Spouse: Helen Marie Bowers (m. 2017)
- Children: 1

Career
- Sport: Golf
- College: University of Georgia
- Turned professional: 2011
- Current tour: PGA Tour
- Professional wins: 9
- Highest ranking: 7 (August 3, 2025) (as of November 1, 2026)

Number of wins by tour
- PGA Tour: 5
- Korn Ferry Tour: 1
- Other: 3

Best results in major championships
- Masters Tournament: T12: 2025
- PGA Championship: T2: 2025
- U.S. Open: 3rd: 2021
- The Open Championship: 2nd: 2025

Harris English (born July 23, 1989) is an American professional golfer and currently a member of the PGA Tour.

== Amateur career ==
Born in Valdosta, Georgia, English attended The Baylor School in Chattanooga, Tennessee, for high school, graduating in 2007. While at Baylor, English won a 2005 Tennessee individual state title, and won four Tennessee team state titles from 2004 to 2007. Committing as a high school junior to the University of Georgia in Athens, English played on the Bulldog golf team and graduated in 2011 with a business degree.

As an amateur, English played in two Nationwide Tour events in 2011: the Stadion Athens Classic at UGA in May and the Nationwide Children's Hospital Invitational in July, which he won. He was only the third amateur to win on the Tour, following Daniel Summerhays in 2007 and Russell Henley in 2011. The tournament was played at the Ohio State University Golf Club, Scarlet Course in Columbus.

== Professional career ==
=== Nationwide Tour ===
After playing in the Walker Cup in 2011 in Scotland, English turned professional in September. His debut was at the Nationwide Tour's Soboba Golf Classic and he nearly won his second event at the WNB Golf Classic, but lost in a playoff to Danny Lee. The runner-up finish moved him to 75th on the Nationwide Tour's money list. In December, English earned his PGA Tour card for 2012 by finishing in a tie for 13th at the PGA Tour Qualifying Tournament.

=== PGA Tour ===
As a PGA Tour rookie in 2012, English made 22 of 27 cuts with three top ten finishes, and earned over $1.18 million to keep his tour card. He secured his first victory in 2013, at the FedEx St. Jude Classic in Memphis in June. Later in the year, English won for the second time at the OHL Classic at Mayakoba. A final round 65 took him to a four stroke win over Brian Stuard.

In February 2015, English held the co-lead at the 54-hole stage of the Farmers Insurance Open, alongside J. B. Holmes. In the final round, he made a birdie at the 72nd hole to join a four-man sudden-death playoff with Holmes, Jason Day and Scott Stallings. At the first playoff hole, English played his lay-up into the thick rough and could only make par on the par-five 18th hole, where he was eliminated alongside Stallings.

In January 2021, English won the Sentry Tournament of Champions at Kapalua Resort in Hawaii. He won in a playoff over Joaquín Niemann. English qualified for the tournament, usually reserved for winners on Tour in the previous year, due to having qualified for the 2020 Tour Championship and the relaxation of the entry requirements due to the disruption caused by COVID-19 to the 2019–20 PGA Tour season.

In June 2021, English won the Travelers Championship with a birdie on the eighth playoff hole against Kramer Hickok. It was the second longest playoff in PGA Tour history.

In September 2021, English played on the U.S. team in the 2021 Ryder Cup at Whistling Straits in Kohler, Wisconsin. The U.S. team won 19–9 and English went 1–2–0 including a loss in his Sunday singles match against Lee Westwood.

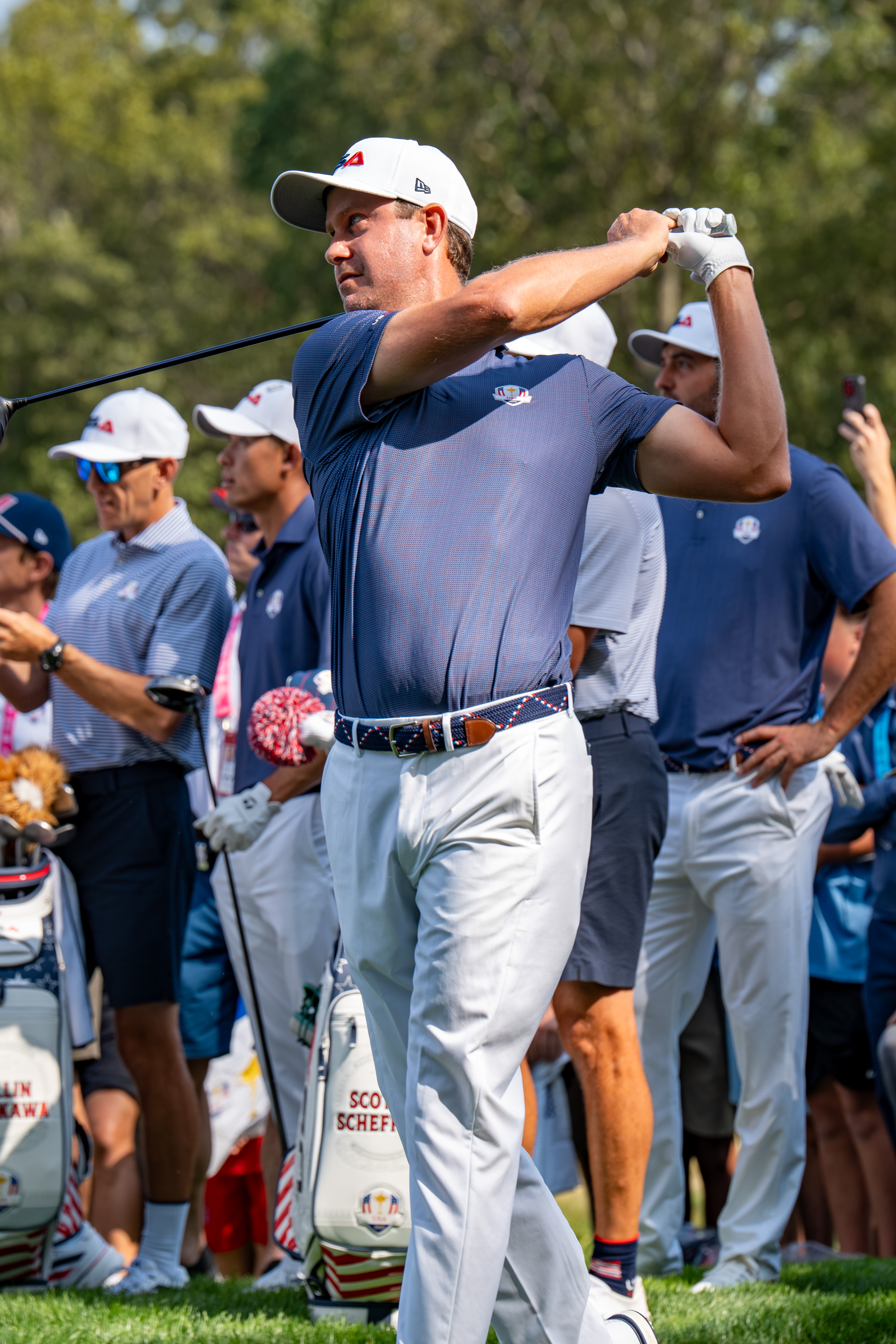
English at the 2025 Ryder Cup.

In January 2025, English won his fifth PGA Tour title, and first since becoming a father, at the Farmers Insurance Open, parring the last 12 holes on a difficult weekend of scoring for a one-stroke victory over Sam Stevens.

== Amateur wins ==
- 2007 Georgia State Amateur
- 2011 Southern Amateur

== Professional wins (9) ==
=== PGA Tour wins (5) ===
No.	Date	Tournament	Winning score	To par	Margin of victory	Runner(s)-up
1	Jun 9, 2013	FedEx St. Jude Classic	66-64-69-69=268	−12	2 strokes	(United States) Phil Mickelson, (United States) Scott Stallings
2	Nov 17, 2013	OHL Classic at Mayakoba	68-62-68-65=263	−21	4 strokes	(United States) Brian Stuard
3	Jan 10, 2021	Sentry Tournament of Champions	65-67-66-69=267	−25	Playoff	(Chile) Joaquín Niemann
4	Jun 27, 2021	Travelers Championship	67-68-67-65=267	−13	Playoff	(United States) Kramer Hickok
5	Jan 25, 2025	Farmers Insurance Open	68-73-66-73=280	−8	1 stroke	(United States) Sam Stevens

PGA Tour playoff record (2–1)

No.	Year	Tournament	Opponent(s)	Result
1	2015	Farmers Insurance Open	(Australia) Jason Day, (United States) J. B. Holmes, (United States) Scott Stallings	Day won with par on second extra hole English and Stallings eliminated by birdie on first hole
2	2021	Sentry Tournament of Champions	(Chile) Joaquín Niemann	Won with birdie on first extra hole
3	2021	Travelers Championship	(United States) Kramer Hickok	Won with birdie on eighth extra hole

=== Nationwide Tour wins (1) ===
No.	Date	Tournament	Winning score	To par	Margin of victory	Runners-up
1	Jul 24, 2011	Nationwide Children's Hospital Invitational (as an amateur)	66-66-68-70=270	−14	1 stroke	(United States) John Peterson (a), (United States) Kyle Reifers

Nationwide Tour playoff record (0–1)

No.	Year	Tournament	Opponent	Result
1	2011	WNB Golf Classic	(New Zealand) Danny Lee	Lost to par on first extra hole

=== Other wins (3) ===
No.	Date	Tournament	Winning score	To par	Margin of victory	Runners-up
1	Dec 15, 2013	Franklin Templeton Shootout (with (United States) Matt Kuchar)	64-60-58=182	−34	7 strokes	(South Africa) Retief Goosen and (Sweden) Freddie Jacobson
2	Dec 10, 2016	Franklin Templeton Shootout (2) (with (United States) Matt Kuchar)	57-66-65=188	−28	1 stroke	(United States) Jerry Kelly and (United States) Steve Stricker
3	Dec 13, 2020	QBE Shootout (3) (with (United States) Matt Kuchar)	58-61-60=179	−37	9 strokes	(Slovakia) Rory Sabbatini and (United States) Kevin Tway

== Results in major championships ==
Results not in chronological order in 2020.

Tournament	2012	2013	2014	2015	2016	2017	2018
Masters Tournament			CUT		T42		
U.S. Open			T48		T37	T46	
The Open Championship	T54	T15	CUT	T68	T46		
PGA Championship		T61	CUT	T48	T60		

Tournament	2019	2020	2021	2022	2023	2024	2025	2026
Masters Tournament			T21		T43	T22	T12	T30
PGA Championship		T19	T64		CUT	T18	T2	T18
U.S. Open	T58	4	3	T61	T8	T41	T59	CUT
The Open Championship		NT	T46	CUT	CUT	T50	2	CUT

Top 10
Did not play

CUT = missed the half-way cut
"T" = tied for place
NT = no tournament due to COVID-19 pandemic

=== Summary ===
Tournament	Wins	2nd	3rd	Top-5	Top-10	Top-25	Events	Cuts made
Masters Tournament	0	0	0	0	0	3	7	6
PGA Championship	0	1	0	1	1	4	10	8
U.S. Open	0	0	1	2	3	3	11	10
The Open Championship	0	1	0	1	1	2	11	7
Totals	0	2	1	4	5	12	39	31

- Most consecutive cuts made – 15 (2015 Open Championship – 2022 U.S. Open)
- Longest streak of top-10s – 1 (five times)

== Results in The Players Championship ==
Tournament	2012	2013	2014	2015	2016	2017	2018	2019
The Players Championship	T64	T33	CUT	CUT	CUT	CUT	CUT	CUT

Tournament	2020	2021	2022	2023	2024	2025	2026
The Players Championship	C			CUT	T19	T30	CUT

Did not play

CUT = missed the halfway cut
"T" indicates a tie for a place
C = canceled after the first round due to the COVID-19 pandemic

== Results in World Golf Championships ==
Results not in chronological order before 2015.

Tournament	2013	2014	2015	2016	2017	2018	2019	2020	2021	2022	2023
Championship		T16		10					66		
Match Play		R16	R32					NT^{1}	T42		T31
Invitational	T14	T31							4		
Champions			T23					NT^{1}	NT^{1}	NT^{1}	

^{1}Cancelled due to COVID-19 pandemic

Top 10
Did not play

NT = No tournament
QF, R16, R32, R64 = Round in which player lost in match play
"T" = Tied
Note that the Championship and Invitational were discontinued from 2022. The Champions was discontinued from 2023.

== U.S. national team appearances ==
Amateur

- Walker Cup: 2011

Professional

- Ryder Cup: 2021 (winners), 2025

Ryder Cup points record
2021	2025	Total
0.5	1	1.5

== See also ==
- 2011 PGA Tour Qualifying School graduates
