= John Huh =

American professional golfer (born 1990)

Personal information
- Full name: John Chan-su Huh
- Nationality: United States
- Born: May 21, 1990 (age 36) New York City, New York, U.S.
- Height: 6 ft 0 in (1.83 m)
- Weight: 190 lb (86 kg; 14 st)
- Children: 1

Career
- Sport: Golf
- College: California State University, Northridge
- Turned professional: 2008
- Current tour: PGA Tour
- Former tours: OneAsia Tour; Korean Tour
- Professional wins: 2
- Highest ranking: 62 (January 6, 2013)

Number of wins by tour
- PGA Tour: 1
- Other: 1

Best results in major championships
- Masters Tournament: T11: 2013
- PGA Championship: T68: 2012
- U.S. Open: T17: 2013
- The Open Championship: CUT: 2012, 2013

Achievements and awards
- Korean Tour Rookie of the Year: 2011
- PGA Tour Rookie of the Year: 2012

- John Huh
- Hangul: 허찬수
- RR: Heo Chansu
- MR: Hŏ Ch'ansu

John Chan-su Huh (/ˈhʌ/; Korean: 허찬수; born May 21, 1990) is an American professional golfer who plays on the PGA Tour. His sole victory on the PGA Tour came at the 2012 Mayakoba Golf Classic.

== Early life and amateur career ==
In 1990, Huh was born in New York City to Korean parents. He moved to South Korea shortly after his birth and he lived there for 12 years, then moved to Chicago, Illinois for three years, and then to Los Angeles, California.

Huh attended California State University, Northridge for only two weeks. Huh left college due to the lack of core courses preventing him from receiving a scholarship and being approved for NCAA competition.

== Professional career ==
=== Korean Tour ===
In 2008, Huh turned professional. He played on the Korean Tour for three years. In 2010 he won the Shinhan Donghae Open and was named the 2010 Korean Tour Rookie of the Year. He also played on the OneAsia Tour in 2010 and 2011, finishing 46th and 15th on the Order of Merit, respectively. He earned his PGA Tour card for 2012 by finishing in a tie for 27th at qualifying school, making the cut on the number (two Nationwide Tour graduates were among the top 25, allowing Huh to earn a Tour card). Prior to qualifying school, Huh had no starts on a U.S.-based professional tour.

=== PGA Tour ===
In only his second PGA Tour event, Huh finished in a tie for 6th at the Farmers Insurance Open. He continued his strong play the following week when he finished in a tie for 12th at the Waste Management Phoenix Open. In only his fifth PGA Tour event, Huh picked up his first victory at the Mayakoba Golf Classic, defeating Robert Allenby in an eight-hole sudden death playoff. Allenby held a two stroke lead with one hole to play but double bogeyed after putting his tee shot in the trees, and a Huh par forced a playoff. The playoff tied the second longest playoff in PGA Tour history. Huh made the cut in his first six PGA Tour events. He was in contention at the Valero Texas Open, but fell two shots short of champion Ben Curtis and finished in a tie for second. Huh broke into the top-100 of the Official World Golf Ranking for the first time, moving to 90th. In May, Huh finished in a tie for fifth at the Crowne Plaza Invitational at Colonial. Huh played in his first major at the 2012 Open Championship, earning entry through FedEx Cup standings, where he missed the cut. He would also be the only rookie to advance to the 2012 Tour Championship, the fourth and final event of the FedEx Cup. Huh's performance was good enough for 28th on the money list, earning him entry into the 2013 Masters Tournament (top 30 money earners were given automatic entry). Huh won the PGA Tour Rookie of the Year for his 2012 season, the first person of Korean descent to win the honor.

Huh was unable to repeat the success of 2012, but did well enough to go to the FedEx Cup. He finished T11 at the Masters and earned entry into the 2014 tournament. His best finish of the season was a T3 at the Wyndham Championship and reached a career high of 62nd in the OWGR.

Huh had two T3 finishes (Valero Texas Open and Barracuda Championship) and finished 96th in the FedEx Cup.

Despite no finish better than 17th, Huh finished 110th in the FedEx Cup.

Huh's season best was a T-6 at the Waste Management Phoenix Open, en route to finishing 95th in the FedEx Cup.

Huh had two top-10 finishes (Shriners Hospitals for Children Open and Valspar Championship) and finished the season 121st in the FedEx Cup.

Huh's best performance was a T3 at the CareerBuilder Challenge, en route to a 112th place finish in the FedEx Cup. This marked his seventh straight season making the FedEx Cup playoffs.

Due to injuries, Huh competed in just 13 events, with only four made cuts. He ended the season 220th in the FedEx Cup.

In 8 events, Huh made the cut in 5 of them, but never finished higher than T40. He finished 213th in the FedEx Cup.

=== Korn Ferry Tour ===
Huh played in 20 events, making 11 cuts. However, he had no top-10 finishes, and ended the season 153rd in the FedEx Cup. Huh entered the Korn Ferry Tour Finals, and his 7th place finish at the Korn Ferry Tour Championship resulted in a 11th place finish on the Korn Ferry Tour Finals points list. This enabled him regain his PGA Tour card for the 2022 season.

== Professional wins (2) ==
=== PGA Tour wins (1) ===
No.	Date	Tournament	Winning score	Margin of victory	Runner-up
1	Feb 26, 2012	Mayakoba Golf Classic	−13 (67-70-71-63=271)	Playoff	(Australia) Robert Allenby

PGA Tour playoff record (1–0)

No.	Year	Tournament	Opponent	Result
1	2012	Mayakoba Golf Classic	(Australia) Robert Allenby	Won with par on eighth extra hole

=== Korean Tour wins (1) ===
No.	Date	Tournament	Winning score	Margin of victory	Runner-up
1	Oct 3, 2010	Shinhan Donghae Open	−11 (73-66-70-68=277)	2 strokes	(South Korea) K. J. Choi

== Results in major championships ==
Results not in chronological order in 2020.

Tournament	2012	2013	2014	2015	2016	2017	2018
Masters Tournament		T11	CUT				
U.S. Open		T17					
The Open Championship	CUT	CUT					
PGA Championship	T68	CUT	CUT				

Tournament	2019	2020	2021
Masters Tournament			
PGA Championship			
U.S. Open			CUT
The Open Championship		NT	

Did not play

CUT = missed the half-way cut
"T" indicates a tie for a place
NT = No tournament due to COVID-19 pandemic

=== Summary ===
Tournament	Wins	2nd	3rd	Top-5	Top-10	Top-25	Events	Cuts made
Masters Tournament	0	0	0	0	0	1	2	1
U.S. Open	0	0	0	0	0	1	2	1
The Open Championship	0	0	0	0	0	0	2	0
PGA Championship	0	0	0	0	0	0	3	1
Totals	0	0	0	0	0	2	9	3

- Most consecutive cuts made – 3 (2012 PGA – 2013 U.S. Open)
- Longest streak of top-10s – 0

== Results in The Players Championship ==
Tournament	2012	2013	2014	2015	2016	2017	2018	2019	2020	2021	2022	2023
The Players Championship	T23	T68	T72	CUT	CUT	CUT	CUT	CUT	C			

Did not play

CUT = missed the halfway cut
"T" indicates a tie for a place
C = Canceled after the first round due to the COVID-19 pandemic

== Results in World Golf Championships ==
Tournament	2013
Match Play	
Championship	T28
Invitational	
Champions	

Did not play

"T" = Tied

== See also ==
- 2011 PGA Tour Qualifying School graduates
- 2021 Korn Ferry Tour Finals graduates
