= 2012 FedEx Cup Playoffs =

Tournament information
- Dates: August 23 – September 23, 2012
- Location: Bethpage State Park; TPC Boston; Crooked Stick Golf Club; East Lake Golf Club
- Tour: PGA Tour

Statistics
- Field: 125 for The Barclays; 100 for Deutsche Bank; 70 for BMW Championship; 30 for Tour Championship
- Prize fund: $35,000,000 bonus money
- Winner's share: $10,000,000 bonus money

Champion
- (United States) Brandt Snedeker
- 4,100 points

The 2012 FedEx Cup Playoffs, the series of four golf tournaments that determined the season champion on the U.S.-based PGA Tour, began on August 23 and ended on September 23. It included the following four events:

- The Barclays – Bethpage State Park, Farmingdale, New York
- Deutsche Bank Championship – TPC Boston, Norton, Massachusetts
- BMW Championship – Crooked Stick Golf Club, Carmel, Indiana
- Tour Championship – East Lake Golf Club, Atlanta, Georgia

Brandt Snedeker won the FedEx Cup by winning the Tour Championship.

These were the sixth FedEx Cup playoffs since their inception in 2007.

The point distributions can be seen here.

== Regular season rankings ==
Place	Player	Points	Events
1	(United States) Tiger Woods	2,269	15
2	(United States) Jason Dufner	2,110	19
3	(Northern Ireland) Rory McIlroy	2,092	12
4	(United States) Zach Johnson	2,019	20
5	(United States) Bubba Watson	1,777	15
6	(United States) Hunter Mahan	1,739	19
7	(Sweden) Carl Pettersson	1,691	22
8	(United States) Keegan Bradley	1,670	21
9	(United States) Matt Kuchar	1,600	18
10	(United States) Steve Stricker	1,456	15

== The Barclays ==
The Barclays was played August 23–26. Of the 125 players eligible to play in the event, two did not enter: Jason Dufner (ranked 2) and Spencer Levin (45). Of the 123 entrants, 75 made the second-round cut at 143 (+1).

Nick Watney won by three strokes over Brandt Snedeker and moved to first place in the standings. The top 100 players in the points standings advanced to the Deutsche Bank Championship. This included six players who were outside the top 100 prior to The Barclays: Graham DeLaet (ranked 106th to 44th), Bob Estes (103 to 62), David Hearn (108 to 67), Jason Day (113 to 88), Tommy Gainey (102 to 91), and Jonas Blixt (101 to 97). Six players started the tournament within the top 100 but ended the tournament outside the top 100, ending their playoff chances: John Mallinger (ranked 88th to 101st), Will Claxton (89 to 102), Chad Campbell (91 to 104), Andrés Romero (93 to 106), Freddie Jacobson (95 to 105), and Chris Stroud (99 to 110).

					FedEx Cup rank	
Place	Player	Score	To par	Winnings ($)	After	Before
1	(United States) Nick Watney	65-69-71-69=274	−10	1,440,000	1	49
2	(United States) Brandt Snedeker	70-69-68-70=277	−7	864,000	2	19
T3	(Spain) Sergio García	66-68-69-75=278	−6	464,000	10	33
T3	(United States) Dustin Johnson	67-71-72-68=278	−6	464,000	8	26
T5	(Canada) Graham DeLaet	75-67-72-65=279	−5	281,000	44	106
T5	(United States) Brian Harman	65-75-68-71=279	−5	281,000	41	97
T5	(South Africa) Louis Oosthuizen	70-71-68-70=279	−5	281,000	21	34
T5	(England) Lee Westwood	69-72-68-70=279	−5	281,000	27	51
9	(Australia) Greg Chalmers	70-70-68-72=280	−4	232,000	38	78
T10	(United States) Bud Cauley	71-71-72-67=281	−3	160,889	26	35
T10	(South Africa) Tim Clark	70-72-67-72=281	−3	160,889	35	54
T10	(England) Luke Donald	68-74-69-70=281	−3	160,889	14	16
T10	(United States) Bob Estes	69-66-72-74=281	−3	160,889	62	103
T10	(United States) Tom Gillis	69-72-68-72=281	−3	160,889	57	92
T10	(Canada) David Hearn	70-73-67-71=281	−3	160,889	67	108
T10	(United States) William McGirt	68-74-67-72=281	−3	160,889	46	74
T10	(United States) Kevin Stadler	72-69-65-75=281	−3	160,889	43	70
T10	(United States) Bubba Watson	70-70-70-71=281	−3	160,889	7	5

- Par 71 course

== Deutsche Bank Championship ==
The Deutsche Bank Championship was played August 31 – September 3. Of the 100 players eligible to play in the event, two did not enter: Sergio García (ranked 10) and David Toms (89). Of the 98 entrants, 78 made the second-round cut at one-over-par, 145.

Rory McIlroy won by one stroke over Louis Oosthuizen and moved into first place in the standings. The top 70 players in the points standings advanced to the BMW Championship. This included nine players who were outside the top 70 prior to the Deutsche Bank Championship: Jeff Overton (83 to 40), Bryce Molder (93 to 45), D. A. Points (72 to 54), Troy Matteson (78 to 59), Matt Every (75 to 63), Chris Kirk (81 to 66), Charl Schwartzel (71 to 68), Charley Hoffman (86 to 69) and Dicky Pride (96 to 70). Nine players started the tournament within the top 70 but ended the tournament outside the top 70, ending their playoff chances: Josh Teater (64 to 73), John Rollins (58 to 74), Scott Stallings (61 to 75), Ken Duke (60 to 76), Harris English (63 to 79), Jonathan Byrd (69 to 82), Spencer Levin (66 to 83), Charles Howell III (68 to 84) and Brian Davis (70 to 85).

					FedEx Cup rank	
Place	Player	Score	To par	Winnings ($)	After	Before
1	(Northern Ireland) Rory McIlroy	65-65-67-67=264	−20	1,440,000	1	4
2	(South Africa) Louis Oosthuizen	66-65-63-71=265	−19	864,000	5	21
3	(United States) Tiger Woods	64-68-68-66=266	−18	544,000	3	3
T4	(United States) Dustin Johnson	67-68-65-70=270	−14	352,000	6	8
T4	(United States) Phil Mickelson	68-68-68-66=270	−14	352,000	9	17
6	(United States) Brandt Snedeker	69-70-65-67=271	−13	288,000	4	2
T7	(United States) Jeff Overton	64-71-69-68=272	−12	258,000	40	83
T7	(Australia) Adam Scott	69-69-68-66=272	−12	258,000	25	34
9	(United States) Bryce Molder	65-69-68-71=273	−11	232,000	45	93
T10	(United States) Ryan Moore	64-68-70-72=274	−10	208,000	35	53
T10	(United States) Kevin Stadler	68-71-69-66=274	−10	208,000	32	43

- Par 71 course

== BMW Championship ==
The BMW Championship was played September 6–9. All 70 players eligible to play in the event did so. There was no cut.

Rory McIlroy won his second straight playoff event. He won by two strokes over Phil Mickelson and Lee Westwood. Two players played their way into the Tour Championship: Robert Garrigus (ranked 31 to ranked 20) by finishing tied for 4th, and Ryan Moore (35 to 28) by finishing T-10. Two players played their way out of the Tour Championship: Kyle Stanley (30 to 31) by finishing T-34, and Bill Haas (28 to 32) by finishing T-45. Haas was the defending FedEx Cup champion and this was the sixth straight year that the defending champion failed to make the Tour Championship. Three players, Hunter Mahan, Phil Mickelson, and Steve Stricker, have made the Tour Championship in each year of the playoffs.

The top 30 players in FedEx Cup points after this event advanced to the Tour Championship and also earned spots in the 2013 Masters Tournament, U.S. Open, and (British) Open Championship.

With the FedEx Cup points reset after the BMW Championship, all 30 remaining players have at least a mathematical chance to secure the season crown, and any of the top five players can claim the FedEx Cup with a win in the Tour Championship.

					FedEx Cup rank	
Place	Player	Score	To par	Winnings ($)	After	Before
1	(Northern Ireland) Rory McIlroy	64-68-69-67=268	−20	1,440,000	1	1
T2	(United States) Phil Mickelson	69-67-64-70=270	−18	704,000	4	9
T2	(England) Lee Westwood	68-65-68-69=270	−18	704,000	8	23
T4	(United States) Robert Garrigus	67-69-66-69=271	−17	352,000	20	31
T4	(United States) Tiger Woods	65-67-71-68=271	−17	352,000	2	3
T6	(United States) Dustin Johnson	68-67-67-70=272	−16	278,000	7	6
T6	(Australia) Adam Scott	68-68-66-70=272	−16	278,000	21	25
8	(Fiji) Vijay Singh	65-66-69-73=273	−15	248,000	33	49
9	(United States) Jim Furyk	69-70-67-68=274	−14	232,000	18	21
T10	(United States) Ryan Moore	66-66-73-70=275	−13	208,000	28	35
T10	(United States) Bo Van Pelt	64-69-71-71=275	−13	208,000	19	20

- Par 72 course

== Reset points ==
The points were reset after the BMW Championship.

Place	Player	Points	Reset points	Events
1	(Northern Ireland) Rory McIlroy	7,299	2,500	15
2	(United States) Tiger Woods	4,067	2,250	18
3	(United States) Nick Watney	3,586	2,000	24
4	(United States) Phil Mickelson	3,420	1,800	21
5	(United States) Brandt Snedeker	3,357	1,600	21
6	(South Africa) Louis Oosthuizen	3,167	1,400	18
7	(United States) Dustin Johnson	3,097	1,200	18
8	(England) Lee Westwood	2,726	1,000	14
9	(United States) Zach Johnson	2,576	800	23
10	(United States) Jason Dufner	2,575	600	21

== Tour Championship ==
The Tour Championship was played September 20–23, after a one-week break. All 30 golfers who qualified for the tournament played, and there was no cut. Brandt Snedeker won the tournament by three shots from Justin Rose, and the FedEx Cup.

					FedEx Cup rank	
Place	Player	Score	To par	Winnings ($)	After	Before
1	(United States) Brandt Snedeker	68-70-64-68=270	−10	1,440,000	1	5
2	(England) Justin Rose	66-68-68-71=273	−7	864,000	6	24
T3	(England) Luke Donald	71-69-67-67=274	−6	468,000	9	15
T3	(United States) Ryan Moore	69-70-65-70=274	−6	468,000	11	28
T5	(United States) Webb Simpson	71-68-70-66=275	−5	304,000	16	25
T5	(United States) Bubba Watson	69-66-70-70=275	−5	304,000	13	11
7	(United States) Jim Furyk	69-64-72-72=277	−3	272,000	15	18
T8	(United States) Hunter Mahan	68-73-71-66=278	−2	248,000	19	23
T8	(United States) Tiger Woods	66-73-67-72=278	−2	248,000	3	2
T10	(United States) Robert Garrigus	68-69-69-73=279	−1	205,760	23	20
T10	(United States) Dustin Johnson	69-67-73-70=279	−1	205,760	8	7
T10	(United States) Matt Kuchar	67-69-70-73=279	−1	205,760	18	16
T10	(Northern Ireland) Rory McIlroy	69-68-68-74=279	−1	205,760	2	1
T10	(United States) Bo Van Pelt	67-68-71-73=279	−1	205,760	22	19

- Par 70 course

== Final leaderboard ==
Place	Player	Points	Winnings ($)
1	(United States) Brandt Snedeker	4,100.0	10,000,000
2	(Northern Ireland) Rory McIlroy	2,827.0	3,000,000
3	(United States) Tiger Woods	2,662.5	2,000,000
4	(United States) Nick Watney	2,215.0	1,500,000
5	(United States) Phil Mickelson	2,072.5	1,000,000
6	(England) Justin Rose	1,770.0	800,000
7	(South Africa) Louis Oosthuizen	1,635.0	700,000
8	(United States) Dustin Johnson	1,527.0	600,000
9	(England) Luke Donald	1,275.0	550,000
10	(England) Lee Westwood	1,205.0	500,000

For the full list see here.

== Table of qualifying players ==
Table key:

Win
Top-10 finish
Did not advance to next tournament
Played way into next tournament

	Player	Pre-Playoffs		The Barclays		Deutsche Bank		BMW Champ.		Reset points	Tour Champ.	
	Player	Points	Rank	Finish	Rank after	Finish	Rank after	Finish	Rank after	Reset points	Finish	Final rank
(United States)	Tiger Woods	2,269	1	T38	3	3	3	T4	2	2,250	T8	3
(United States)	Jason Dufner	2,110	2	DNP	6	T18	7	T28	10	600	T20	14
(Northern Ireland)	Rory McIlroy	2,092	3	T24	4	1	1	1	1	2,500	T10	2
(United States)	Zach Johnson	2,019	4	T38	5	T47	8	T12	9	800	T15	12
(United States)	Bubba Watson	1,777	5	T10	7	CUT	10	T12	11	480	T5	13
(United States)	Hunter Mahan	1,739	6	CUT	12	T39	14	70	23	280	T8	19
(Sweden)	Carl Pettersson	1,691	7	T24	9	T57	11	69	17	360	T20	24
(United States)	Keegan Bradley	1,670	8	CUT	13	T13	12	T59	14	420	T23	21
(United States)	Matt Kuchar	1,600	9	T38	11	T35	13	T54	16	380	T10	18
(United States)	Steve Stricker	1,456	10	T54	16	T13	16	T26	13	440	T22	20
(South Africa)	Ernie Els	1,447	11	T54	18	T26	18	T28	22	290	T27	26
(England)	Justin Rose	1,426	12	T46	15	CUT	22	T16	24	270	2	6
(United States)	Webb Simpson	1,424	13	CUT	20	T18	19	T51	25	260	T5	16
(United States)	Phil Mickelson	1,373	14	T38	17	T4	9	T2	4	1,800	T15	5
(United States)	Scott Piercy	1,304	15	CUT	23	T64	29	T37	30	210	T15	27
(England)	Luke Donald	1,294	16	T10	14	T26	17	T28	15	400	T3	9
(United States)	Jim Furyk	1,284	17	CUT	25	T13	21	9	18	340	7	15
(United States)	Rickie Fowler	1,246	18	T24	19	T74	24	T41	27	240	T23	28
(United States)	Brandt Snedeker	1,194	19	2	2	6	4	T37	5	1,600	1	1
(United States)	Johnson Wagner	1,181	20	CUT	28	T51	34	T45	36	–	–	36
(United States)	Bill Haas	1,181	21	CUT	29	T35	28	T45	32	–	–	32
(United States)	Kyle Stanley	1,177	22	CUT	30	T42	30	T34	31	–	–	31
(United States)	Bo Van Pelt	1,175	23	T24	22	T26	20	T10	19	320	T10	22
(United States)	Robert Garrigus	1,155	24	T71	31	T42	31	T4	20	310	T10	23
(United States)	John Huh*	1,123	25	T36	24	T51	27	T16	26	250	29	29
(United States)	Dustin Johnson	1,097	26	T3	8	T4	6	T6	7	1,200	T10	8
(Northern Ireland)	Graeme McDowell	1,037	27	CUT	33	T74	41	T34	42	–	–	42
(Australia)	Marc Leishman	1,003	28	CUT	36	T42	37	T65	46	–	–	46
(United States)	Ben Curtis	997	29	CUT	37	CUT	47	T24	41	–	–	41
(United States)	Mark Wilson	986	30	CUT	39	T66	44	T62	59	–	–	59
(Scotland)	Martin Laird	976	31	T71	40	CUT	50	T62	64	–	–	64
(Australia)	Adam Scott	966	32	62	34	T7	25	T6	21	300	19	25
(Spain)	Sergio García	935	33	T3	10	DNP	15	T24	12	460	T15	17
(South Africa)	Louis Oosthuizen*	928	34	T5	21	2	5	T16	6	1,400	T23	7
(United States)	Bud Cauley*	902	35	T10	26	T57	33	T56	38	–	–	38
(South Korea)	Charlie Wi	901	36	CUT	47	CUT	61	T41	60	–	–	60
(Australia)	John Senden	867	37	T19	32	12	26	T56	29	220	26	30
(United States)	Kevin Na	866	38	CUT	51	T69	64	T26	52	–	–	52
(United States)	Ben Crane	849	39	CUT	52	CUT	67	T41	66	–	–	66
(South Korea)	Noh Seung-yul*	827	40	T67	54	T13	38	T16	37	–	–	37
(Zimbabwe)	Brendon de Jonge	815	41	CUT	56	T60	65	T28	57	–	–	57
(United States)	Ken Duke	776	42	CUT	60	CUT	76	–	–	–	–	76
(United States)	Jimmy Walker	763	43	T38	45	T51	46	64	62	–	–	62
(United States)	Ryan Palmer	745	44	T24	42	CUT	57	T45	55	–	–	55
(United States)	Spencer Levin	735	45	DNP	66	WD	83	–	–	–	–	83
(United States)	John Rollins	732	46	T54	58	CUT	74	–	–	–	–	74
(United States)	Jonathan Byrd	732	47	CUT	69	77	82	–	–	–	–	82
(England)	Brian Davis	728	48	CUT	70	CUT	85	–	–	–	–	85
(United States)	Nick Watney	726	49	1	1	T20	2	T45	3	2,000	28	4
(United States)	D. A. Points	714	50	CUT	72	T20	54	T56	63	–	–	63
(England)	Lee Westwood	713	51	T5	27	T13	23	T2	8	1,000	30	10
(United States)	J. J. Henry	713	52	CUT	73	T60	80	–	–	–	–	80
(United States)	Matt Every*	711	53	WD	75	T35	63	T51	67	–	–	67
(South Africa)	Tim Clark	707	54	T10	35	CUT	43	T59	56	–	–	56
(England)	Ian Poulter	698	55	T36	50	T47	48	T12	39	–	–	39
(United States)	Cameron Tringale	689	56	CUT	79	CUT	90	–	–	–	–	90
(Fiji)	Vijay Singh	669	57	T46	59	T26	49	8	33	–	–	33
(United States)	Jeff Overton	667	58	CUT	83	T7	40	T51	44	–	–	44
(United States)	Charles Howell III	666	59	T54	68	CUT	84	–	–	–	–	84
(United States)	Troy Matteson	662	60	T65	78	T20	59	T16	44	–	–	44
(United States)	Ted Potter Jr.*	647	61	CUT	84	T69	93	–	–	–	–	93
(Republic of Ireland)	Pádraig Harrington	646	62	T19	48	59	56	T16	43	–	–	43
(United States)	Sean O'Hair	644	63	T54	74	T64	81	–	–	–	–	81
(United States)	Ryan Moore	635	64	T24	53	T10	35	T10	28	230	T3	11
(Australia)	Aaron Baddeley	635	65	CUT	85	T42	78	–	–	–	–	78
(United States)	Michael Thompson	634	66	T63	82	CUT	92	–	–	–	–	92
(United States)	Charley Hoffman	628	67	CUT	86	T26	69	T54	69	–	–	69
(Australia)	Geoff Ogilvy	624	68	T19	49	T51	53	T28	47	–	–	47
(United States)	David Toms	623	69	CUT	89	DNP	95	–	–	–	–	95
(United States)	Kevin Stadler	620	70	T10	43	T10	32	T45	34	–	–	34
(South Korea)	Bae Sang-moon*	604	71	CUT	92	78	96	–	–	–	–	96
(United States)	Pat Perez	603	72	T38	65	T26	55	T45	54	–	–	54
(South Africa)	Rory Sabbatini	602	73	CUT	94	CUT	97	–	–	–	–	97
(United States)	William McGirt	602	74	T10	46	T26	39	68	50	–	–	50
(United States)	Blake Adams	599	75	T65	87	T60	91	–	–	–	–	91
(United States)	George McNeill	599	76	T67	90	T47	86	–	–	–	–	86
(South Korea)	K. J. Choi	597	77	T73	95	CUT	98	–	–	–	–	98
(Australia)	Greg Chalmers	589	78	9	38	T39	36	T16	35	–	–	35
(United States)	Dicky Pride*	586	79	CUT	96	T20	70	T59	70	–	–	70
(United States)	Chris Kirk	574	80	T46	81	T35	66	T12	49	–	–	49
(United States)	John Merrick	572	81	CUT	98	T20	72	–	–	–	–	72
(United States)	J. B. Holmes	568	82	T19	55	T39	52	T34	48	–	–	48
(United States)	Daniel Summerhays*	567	83	CUT	99	T69	99	–	–	–	–	99
(England)	Greg Owen	556	84	T38	76	CUT	88	–	–	–	–	88
(United States)	Martin Flores*	556	85	CUT	100	T69	100	–	–	–	–	100
(United States)	Scott Stallings	554	86	T24	61	T66	75	–	–	–	–	75
(United States)	Harris English*	549	87	T24	63	T69	79	–	–	–	–	79
(United States)	John Mallinger	543	88	CUT	101	–	–	–	–	–	–	101
(United States)	Will Claxton*	530	89	CUT	102	–	–	–	–	–	–	102
(South Africa)	Charl Schwartzel	519	90	T24	71	T47	68	T28	61	–	–	61
(United States)	Chad Campbell	517	91	CUT	104	–	–	–	–	–	–	104
(United States)	Tom Gillis	511	92	T10	57	T26	42	T16	40	–	–	40
(Argentina)	Andrés Romero	506	93	CUT	106	–	–	–	–	–	–	106
(United States)	Josh Teater	506	94	T19	64	T60	73	–	–	–	–	73
(Sweden)	Freddie Jacobson	500	95	T67	105	–	–	–	–	–	–	105
(United States)	Bryce Molder	495	96	T46	93	9	45	67	65	–	–	65
(United States)	Brian Harman*	493	97	T5	41	T74	51	T41	51	–	–	51
(United States)	Ricky Barnes	489	98	T24	77	CUT	89	–	–	–	–	89
(United States)	Chris Stroud	484	99	CUT	110	–	–	–	–	–	–	110
(United States)	Roberto Castro*	477	100	T24	80	T51	77	–	–	–	–	77
(Sweden)	Jonas Blixt*	470	101	T46	97	T20	71	–	–	–	–	71
(United States)	Tommy Gainey	464	102	T38	91	T66	94	–	–	–	–	94
(United States)	Bob Estes	458	103	T10	62	T42	62	T37	58	–	–	58
(United States)	Kevin Chappell	447	104	CUT	114	–	–	–	–	–	–	114
(United States)	Davis Love III	443	105	CUT	115	–	–	–	–	–	–	115
(Canada)	Graham DeLaet	441	106	T5	44	CUT	60	T37	53	–	–	53
(United States)	Jeff Maggert	433	107	T73	116	–	–	–	–	–	–	116
(Canada)	David Hearn	432	108	T10	67	T26	58	T65	68	–	–	68
(United States)	Kevin Streelman	424	109	T63	112	–	–	–	–	–	–	112
(United States)	Brian Gay	424	110	T54	109	–	–	–	–	–	–	109
(England)	Gary Christian*	422	111	T46	103	–	–	–	–	–	–	103
(Australia)	Robert Allenby	417	112	CUT	118	–	–	–	–	–	–	118
(Australia)	Jason Day	417	113	T24	88	T51	87	–	–	–	–	87
(South Africa)	Trevor Immelman	411	114	T67	117	–	–	–	–	–	–	117
(United States)	James Driscoll	408	115	75	119	–	–	–	–	–	–	119
(Australia)	Rod Pampling	398	116	T46	107	–	–	–	–	–	–	107
(Sweden)	Henrik Stenson	394	117	T54	111	–	–	–	–	–	–	111
(United States)	Troy Kelly*	394	118	T54	113	–	–	–	–	–	–	113
(United States)	Billy Mayfair	393	119	T46	109	–	–	–	–	–	–	109
(United States)	Colt Knost*	390	120	CUT	120	–	–	–	–	–	–	120
(United States)	Harrison Frazar	387	121	CUT	121	–	–	–	–	–	–	121
(United States)	Jerry Kelly	385	122	CUT	122	–	–	–	–	–	–	122
(United States)	Boo Weekley	365	123	CUT	123	–	–	–	–	–	–	123
(United States)	Heath Slocum	365	124	CUT	124	–	–	–	–	–	–	124
(United States)	Jason Bohn	363	125	WD	125	–	–	–	–	–	–	125

* First-time Playoffs participant
