= 2012 Open Championship =

Coordinates: 53.7495°N 3.018°W

Tournament information
- Dates: 19–22 July 2012
- Location: Lytham St Annes, Lancashire, England
- Course: Royal Lytham & St Annes; Golf Club
- Organized by: The R&A
- Tours: European Tour; PGA Tour; Japan Golf Tour

Statistics
- Par: 70
- Length: 7,086 yards (6,479 m)
- Field: 156 players, 83 after cut
- Cut: 143 (+3)
- Prize fund: £5,000,000 €6,316,000 $7,810,500
- Winner's share: £900,000 €1,136,880 $1,405,890

Champion
- (South Africa) Ernie Els
- 273 (−7)

Location in England
Location in Lancashire. England

The 2012 Open Championship was a men's major golf championship and the 141st Open Championship, held from 19 to 22 July at Royal Lytham & St Annes Golf Club in Lytham St Annes, Lancashire, England. Ernie Els won his second Claret Jug, one stroke ahead of runner-up Adam Scott. Tiger Woods and Brandt Snedeker finished tied for third, four strokes behind Els, who gained his fourth major title.

Scott was the leader after 54 holes at 199 (−11), with Els six strokes back, tied for fifth. After a birdie at the 14th hole, Scott was four strokes ahead with four holes to play. Els, two groups ahead of Scott on the course, birdied the 18th hole for a score of 68 and the clubhouse lead at 273 (−7). When Scott agonizingly bogeyed each of the final four holes, he dropped to second and Els won the Championship by a single stroke.

Entering the final round, Graeme McDowell and Snedeker were tied for second at 203 (−7), four strokes behind Scott. McDowell shot a 75 (+5) and Snedeker a 74 to knock them out of contention; Woods had a triple bogey at the sixth hole and carded a 73 to tie for third with Snedeker.

== Venue ==
The 2012 event was the eleventh Open Championship to be played at Royal Lytham & St Annes. The previous one was in 2001, when David Duval won his only major championship, three strokes clear of runner-up Niclas Fasth. Tom Lehman won the previous Open at the venue, in 1996.

=== Course layout ===
Hole	Yards	Par	Hole	Yards	Par
1	205	3	10	387	4
2	481	4	11	598	5
3	478	4	12	198	3
4	392	4	13	355	4
5	219	3	14	444	4
6	492	4^	15	462	4
7	592	5	16	336	4
8	416	4	17	453	4
9	165	3	18	413	4
Out	3,440	34	In	3,646	36
Source:		Total		7,086	70

^ Hole #6 was a par 5 in previous Opens.

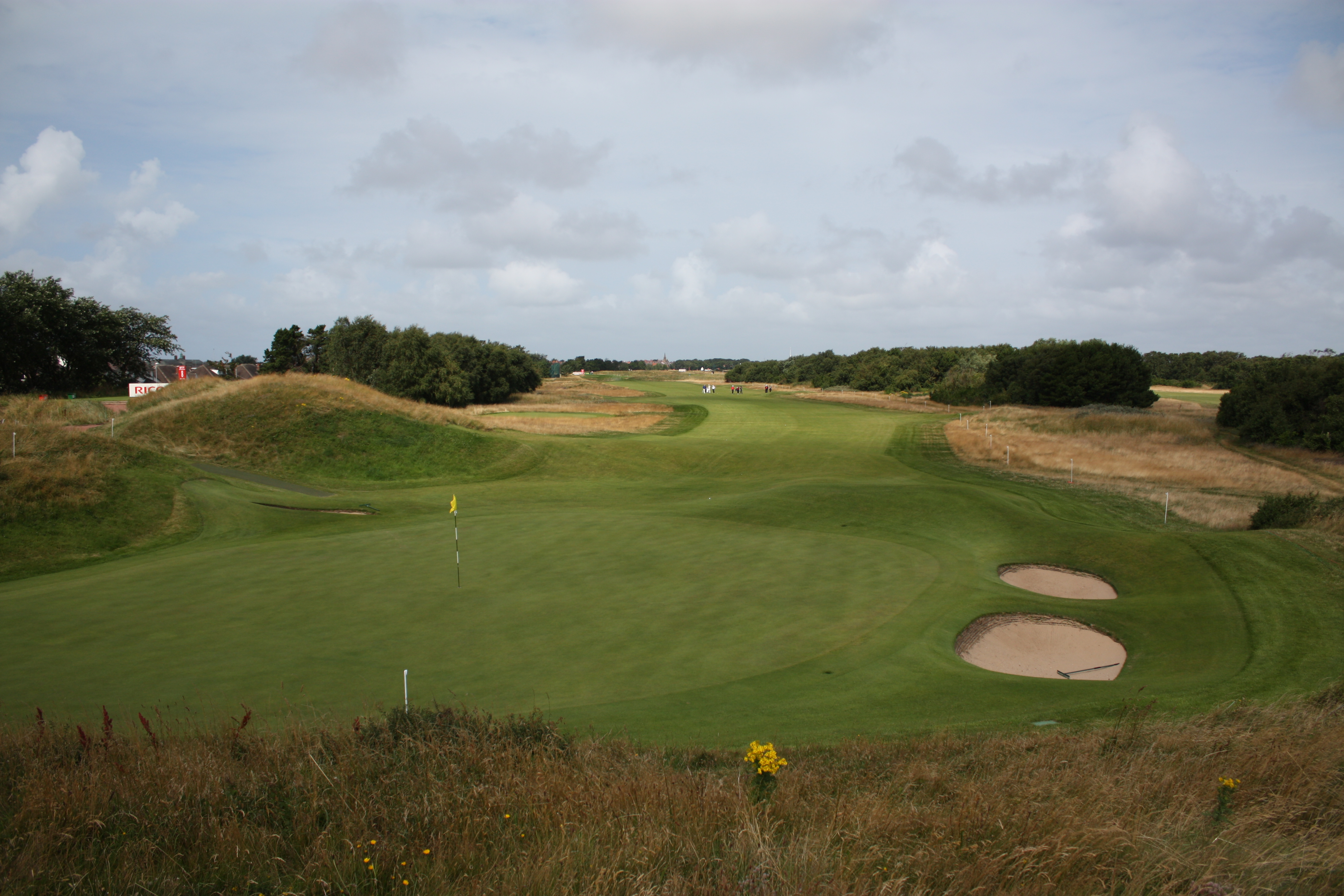
7th hole green in 2009

Lengths of the course for The Open Championship (since 1950):

- 2012: 7,086 yards (6,479 m), par 70
- 2001: 6,905 yards (6,314 m), par 71
- 1996: 6,892 yards (6,302 m), par 71
- 1988: 6,857 yards (6,270 m), par 71
- 1979: 6,822 yards (6,238 m), par 71
- 1974: 6,822 yards (6,238 m), par 71
- 1969: 6,848 yards (6,262 m), par 71
- 1963: 6,836 yards (6,251 m), par 70
- 1958: 6,635 yards (6,067 m), par 71
- 1952: 6,657 yards (6,087 m), par 72

== Field ==
Each player is classified according to the first category in which he qualified, but other categories are shown in parentheses.

1. Past Open Champions aged 60 or under on 22 July 2012

- Mark Calcavecchia
- Stewart Cink (2,4)
- Darren Clarke (2,4,5,7)
- Ben Curtis (2,4)
- John Daly
- David Duval
- Ernie Els (2,4,6,20)
- Todd Hamilton (2)
- Pádraig Harrington (2,4,14)
- Paul Lawrie (6,7)
- Tom Lehman
- Justin Leonard (4)
- Sandy Lyle
- Louis Oosthuizen (2,4,6,7)
- Tiger Woods (2,6,12,14,20)
- Eligible but not competing: Ian Baker-Finch, Nick Faldo, Greg Norman (4), Nick Price, Bill Rogers.
- Mark O'Meara withdrew due to an unspecified injury.

2. The Open Champions for 2002–2011

3. Past Open Champions born between 22 July 1946 and 19 July 1948

- This exemption category was introduced in 2008 when the age limit for past Open Champions was reduced from 65 to 60. It enabled those past Champions aged 60 to 65 at that time to continue playing until they were 65. Johnny Miller is now the only player in this category. He has not played in the Open since 1991.

4. Past Open Champions finishing in the top 10 and tying for 10th place in The Open Championship 2007–2011

- Tom Watson

5. First 10 and anyone tying for 10th place in the 2011 Open Championship

- Thomas Bjørn (6,7)
- Chad Campbell
- Simon Dyson (6,7)
- Rickie Fowler (6)
- Sergio García (6,7)
- Raphaël Jacquelin
- Dustin Johnson (6,16,20)
- Davis Love III
- Phil Mickelson (6,13,16,20)
- Anthony Kim did not play due to tendinitis in his left arm.

6. The first 50 players on the Official World Golf Ranking for Week 20, 2012

- Aaron Baddeley (16,20)
- Bae Sang-moon (24)
- Keegan Bradley (14,16)
- K. J. Choi (15,16,20)
- Nicolas Colsaerts (7)
- Luke Donald (7,8,16)
- Jason Dufner (16)
- Jim Furyk (20)
- Bill Haas (16,20)
- Anders Hansen (7)
- Peter Hanson (7)
- Freddie Jacobson (16)
- Zach Johnson
- Martin Kaymer (7,14)
- Matt Kuchar (15,16,20)
- Martin Laird
- Hunter Mahan (16,20)
- Graeme McDowell (7,12)
- Rory McIlroy (7,12)
- Francesco Molinari (7)
- Kevin Na
- Geoff Ogilvy (16,20)
- Carl Pettersson
- Ian Poulter (7)
- Álvaro Quirós (7)
- Justin Rose (16)
- Charl Schwartzel (7,13,20)
- Adam Scott (16,20)
- John Senden (16)
- Brandt Snedeker (16)
- Steve Stricker (16,20)
- Bo Van Pelt (16)
- Nick Watney (16,20)
- Bubba Watson (13,16,20)
- Lee Westwood (7)
- Mark Wilson (16)
- Jason Day (16,20) did not compete for personal reasons.
- Robert Karlsson did not compete.
- Webb Simpson (12,16,20) did not compete for personal reasons.
- David Toms (16,20) did not compete.

7. First 30 in the European Tour Race to Dubai for 2011

- Thomas Aiken
- Rafa Cabrera-Bello
- Paul Casey
- George Coetzee
- Gonzalo Fernández-Castaño
- Grégory Havret
- Michael Hoey
- Miguel Ángel Jiménez
- Pablo Larrazábal
- Joost Luiten
- Alex Norén
- Richie Ramsay

8. The BMW PGA Championship winners for 2010–2012

- Simon Khan

9. First 3 and anyone tying for 3rd place, not exempt having applied above, in the top 20 of the 2012 PGA European Tour Race to Dubai on completion of the 2012 BMW PGA Championship

- Branden Grace
- Jbe' Kruger
- Robert Rock

10. First 2 European Tour members and any European Tour members tying for 2nd place, not exempt, in a cumulative money list taken from the seven official European Tour events leading up to and including the 2012 Irish Open

- Thongchai Jaidee
- Richard Sterne

11. The leading player, not exempt having applied above, in the first 5 and ties of each of the 2012 Alstom Open de France and the 2012 Barclays Scottish Open

- Marcel Siem
- Jeev Milkha Singh

12. The U.S. Open Champions for 2008–2012

- Lucas Glover

13. The U.S. Masters Champions for 2008–2012

- Ángel Cabrera
- Trevor Immelman

14. The U.S. PGA Champions for 2007–2011

- Yang Yong-eun (16,20)

15. The U.S. PGA Tour Players Champions for 2010–2012

- Tim Clark

16. The leading 30 qualifiers for the 2011 PGA Tour's Tour Championship

- Jonathan Byrd
- Charles Howell III
- Chez Reavie
- Vijay Singh
- Gary Woodland

17. First 3 and anyone tying for 3rd place, not exempt having applied from #6, in the top 20 of the FedEx Cup points list of the 2012 PGA Tour on completion of the HP Byron Nelson Championship

- John Huh
- Kyle Stanley
- Johnson Wagner

18. First 2 PGA Tour members and any PGA Tour members tying for 2nd place, not exempt, in a cumulative money list taken from The Players Championship and the five PGA Tour events leading up to and including the 2012 Greenbrier Classic

- Marc Leishman
- Ted Potter Jr.

19. The leading player, not exempt having applied above, in the first 5 and ties of each of the 2012 Greenbrier Classic and the 2012 John Deere Classic

- Troy Kelly
- Troy Matteson

20. Playing members of the 2011 Presidents Cup teams

- Robert Allenby
- Retief Goosen
- Ryo Ishikawa
- Kim Kyung-tae

21. First place on the 2011 Asian Tour Order of Merit

- Juvic Pagunsan

22. First place on the 2011 PGA Tour of Australasia Order of Merit

- Greg Chalmers

23. First place on the 2011 Sunshine Tour Order of Merit

- Garth Mulroy

24. The 2011 Japan Open Champion

25. First 2, not exempt, on the Official Money List of the Japan Golf Tour for 2011

- Tadahiro Takayama
- Toru Taniguchi

26. The leading 4 players, not exempt, in the 2012 Mizuno Open

- Hiroyuki Fujita
- Brad Kennedy
- Toshinori Muto
- Koumei Oda

27. First 2 and anyone tying for 2nd place, not exempt having applied (26) above, in a cumulative money list taken from all official 2012 Japan Golf Tour events up to and including the 2012 Mizuno Open

- Yoshinori Fujimoto
- Brendan Jones

28. The Senior British Open Champion for 2011

- Russ Cochran did not compete.

29. The 2012 Amateur Champion

- Alan Dunbar (a)

30. The 2011 U.S. Amateur Champion

- Kelly Kraft forfeited his invitation by turning pro in April 2012.

31. The 2011 European Individual Amateur Champion

- Manuel Trappel (a)

32. The Mark H. McCormack Medal winner for 2011

- Patrick Cantlay forfeited his exemption by turning professional in June 2012.

=== Qualifying ===
==== International Final Qualifying ====
- Australasia: Nick Cullen, Ashley Hall, Aaron Townsend
- Africa: Adilson da Silva, Andrew Georgiou, Grant Veenstra
- Asia: Kodai Ichihara, Anirban Lahiri, Mardan Mamat, Prayad Marksaeng
- America: Stephen Ames, Daniel Chopra, James Driscoll, Harris English, Bob Estes, Justin Hicks, Greg Owen, Andrés Romero
- Europe: Matthew Baldwin, Alejandro Cañizares, Jamie Donaldson, Richard Finch, Ross Fisher, Marcus Fraser, James Morrison, Thorbjørn Olesen, Lee Slattery, Sam Walker

==== Local Final Qualifying ====
- Hillside: Warren Bennett, Steven Tiley, Dale Whitnell
- Southport & Ainsdale: Ian Keenan, Morten Ørum Madsen, Elliot Saltman
- St Annes Old Links: Paul Broadhurst, Rafael Echenique, Barry Lane
- West Lancashire: Steven Alker, Steven O'Hara, Scott Pinckney
- (a) denotes amateur

Twenty players were appearing in their first major championship: Nick Cullen, Alan Dunbar, Harris English, Yoshinori Fujimoto, Andrew Georgiou, Ashley Hall, John Huh, Kodai Ichihara, Ian Keenan, Jbe' Kruger, Anirban Lahiri, Morten Ørum Madsen, Garth Mulroy, Steven O'Hara, Juvic Pagunsan, Ted Potter Jr., Aaron Townsend, Manuel Trappel, Grant Veenstra, and Dale Whitnell.

A further 12 players were appearing in their first Open Championship: Matthew Baldwin, Keegan Bradley, Rafa Cabrera-Bello, Justin Hicks, Troy Kelly, Troy Matteson, James Morrison, Scott Pinckney, Chez Reavie, Michael Thompson, Johnson Wagner, and Sam Walker.

Notable absences included Mark O'Meara (who had appeared in the previous 17 Opens) and Henrik Stenson (who had appeared in the previous seven).

=== Alternates ===
Where places are available to make up the full entry of 156, these additional places are allocated in ranking order from the Official World Golf Ranking. The alternates are allocated when it becomes clear that additional places are available (using the latest World Rankings), except that places allocated after the issue of Week 27 rankings (9 July) use those rankings.

After the final qualifying events on 15 July there were 157 qualified players. The withdrawal of Robert Karlsson reduced the field size to the usual 156. Russ Cochran then withdrew and was replaced by Michael Thompson (ranked 56), as Ben Crane (ranked 54) chose not to travel.

== Round summaries ==
=== First round ===
Thursday, 19 July 2012

The weather conditions during the first day of the tournament turned out to be less harsh than expected, with very little wind and cloudy skies. Adam Scott made eight birdies and only two bogeys en route to a 6-under-par 64, tying the course record. Tiger Woods shot a 3-under 67, hitting all but one fairway in regulation.

Place	Player	Score	To par
1	(Australia) Adam Scott	64	−6
T2	(Belgium) Nicolas Colsaerts	65	−5
T2	(United States) Zach Johnson	65	−5
T2	(Scotland) Paul Lawrie	65	−5
5	(United States) Brandt Snedeker	66	−4
T6	(South Africa) Ernie Els	67	−3
T6	(Sweden) Peter Hanson	67	−3
T6	(Northern Ireland) Graeme McDowell	67	−3
T6	(Northern Ireland) Rory McIlroy	67	−3
T6	(Japan) Toshinori Muto	67	−3
T6	(United States) Steve Stricker	67	−3
T6	(United States) Bubba Watson	67	−3
T6	(United States) Tiger Woods	67	−3

=== Second round ===
Friday, 20 July 2012

Some rain showers wet the course overnight and in the early morning hours, but the calm conditions continued into day two of the tournament. Brandt Snedeker fired a bogey-free round of 64 to vault to the top of the leaderboard, one shot ahead of Adam Scott, who shot 67. Tiger Woods, for the second straight round, only missed one fairway in regulation and shot another 3-under 67, including a holed green-side bunker shot for birdie on the 18th hole, to enter the weekend trailing the lead by four shots.

Tom Watson, at 62 years of age, set a new record as the oldest player to make the cut in the history of the Open Championship, beating his own record set in 2011.

For the first time since 2003, no amateurs made the halfway cut.

Place	Player	Score	To par
1	(United States) Brandt Snedeker	66-64=130	−10
2	(Australia) Adam Scott	64-67=131	−9
3	(United States) Tiger Woods	67-67=134	−6
4	(Denmark) Thorbjørn Olesen	69-66=135	−5
T5	(South Africa) Thomas Aiken	68-68=136	−4
T5	(United States) Jason Dufner	70-66=136	−4
T5	(United States) Matt Kuchar	69-67=136	−4
T5	(Scotland) Paul Lawrie	65-71=136	−4
T5	(Northern Ireland) Graeme McDowell	67-69=136	−4
10	(South Africa) Ernie Els	67-70=137	−3

Amateurs: Dunbar (+6), Trappel (+17).

=== Third round ===
Saturday, 21 July 2012

In the third round, leader Brandt Snedeker faltered by shooting a 73 (3-over-par) to move him down to a tie for second with Graeme McDowell, who rose up to second place with a score of 67 (3-under-par). Adam Scott, who entered the round one stroke behind Snedeker, shot a 68 (two under par) to move to eleven strokes under par, retaking the lead from Snedeker. Tiger Woods shot an even par of 70 to stay at six strokes under par, moving him to fourth place behind Scott, McDowell, and Snedeker.

Place	Player	Score	To par
1	(Australia) Adam Scott	64-67-68=199	−11
T2	(Northern Ireland) Graeme McDowell	67-69-67=203	−7
T2	(United States) Brandt Snedeker	66-64-73=203	−7
4	(United States) Tiger Woods	67-67-70=204	−6
T5	(South Africa) Ernie Els	67-70-68=205	−5
T5	(United States) Zach Johnson	65-74-66=205	−5
7	(Denmark) Thorbjørn Olesen	69-66-71=206	−4
T8	(South Africa) Thomas Aiken	68-68-71=207	−3
T8	(United States) Bill Haas	71-68-68=207	−3
T10	(United States) Mark Calcavecchia	71-68-69=208	−2
T10	(United States) Matt Kuchar	69-67-72=208	−2
T10	(South Africa) Louis Oosthuizen	72-68-68=208	−2
T10	(United States) Bubba Watson	67-73-68=208	−2

=== Final round ===
Sunday, 22 July 2012

In the fourth and final round, leader Adam Scott got off to a poor start on the front nine holes by scoring a 36 (2-over-par), bringing his score to nine-under par. Graeme McDowell, Brandt Snedeker, and Tiger Woods entered the round within striking distance of Scott, but each faltered and sank out of contention. McDowell shot a 75 (five-over-par), and fell to a tie for fifth with Luke Donald. Snedeker double-bogeyed the seventh and eighth holes, leading to a final round score of 74 (4-over-par), in a tie for third with Woods. Woods had trouble with a greenside bunker on the sixth hole, and triple-bogeyed the hole which he had birdied in each of the three previous rounds. Woods scored a 73 to put him into a tie for third with Snedeker.

Despite two bogeys on the front nine, Ernie Els got back to even par for the round with a birdie at the 12th hole and then birdied the 14th. Scott also birdied the 14th but bogeyed the next three to leave him at 7-under, tied with Els, who had birdied the final hole. On the tournament's 72nd hole, Scott put his tee shot into a bunker and had to exit sideways to the fairway. His third shot left him an 8-foot (2.4 m) par-saving putt to force a playoff, but it missed to the left. Els was bogey-free on the back nine with four birdies to card a 32 (−4) and win by one stroke.

Place	Player	Score	To par	Money (£)
1	(South Africa) Ernie Els	67-70-68-68=273	−7	900,000
2	(Australia) Adam Scott	64-67-68-75=274	−6	520,000
T3	(United States) Brandt Snedeker	66-64-73-74=277	−3	297,500
T3	(United States) Tiger Woods	67-67-70-73=277	−3	297,500
T5	(England) Luke Donald	70-68-71-69=278	−2	195,000
T5	(Northern Ireland) Graeme McDowell	67-69-67-75=278	−2	195,000
T7	(South Africa) Thomas Aiken	68-68-71-72=279	−1	142,500
T7	(Belgium) Nicolas Colsaerts	65-77-72-65=279	−1	142,500
T9	(United States) Mark Calcavecchia	71-68-69-72=280	E	79,600
T9	(Spain) Miguel Ángel Jiménez	71-69-73-67=280	E	79,600
T9	(United States) Dustin Johnson	73-68-68-71=280	E	79,600
T9	(United States) Zach Johnson	65-74-66-75=280	E	79,600
T9	(United States) Matt Kuchar	69-67-72-72=280	E	79,600
T9	(Sweden) Alex Norén	71-71-69-69=280	E	79,600
T9	(Australia) Geoff Ogilvy	72-68-73-67=280	E	79,600
T9	(Denmark) Thorbjørn Olesen	69-66-71-74=280	E	79,600
T9	(England) Ian Poulter	71-69-73-67=280	E	79,600
T9	(Fiji) Vijay Singh	70-72-68-70=280	E	79,600

==== Scorecard ====
Hole	1	2	3	4	5	6	7	8	9	10	11	12	13	14	15	16	17	18
Par	3	4	4	4	3	4	5	4	3	4	5	3	4	4	4	4	4	4
(South Africa) Els	−5	−4	−4	−4	−4	−4	−4	−4	−3	−4	−4	−5	−5	−6	−6	−6	−6	−7
(Australia) Scott	−10	−11	−10	−10	−10	−9	−9	−9	−9	−9	−9	−9	−9	−10	−9	−8	−7	−6
(United States) Snedeker	−7	−7	−7	−7	−7	−7	−5	−3	−3	−4	−3	−2	−2	−2	−3	−4	−4	−3
(United States) Woods	−6	−6	−6	−6	−6	−3	−4	−4	−3	−4	−4	−5	−4	−3	−2	−2	−2	−3
(England) Donald	−1	−1	−1	−1	−1	−1	−1	−1	−1	E	−1	E	−1	−2	−2	−2	−2	−2
(Northern Ireland) McDowell	−7	−6	−6	−6	−6	−5	−5	−6	−5	−4	−3	−3	−2	−2	−2	−3	−2	−2
(South Africa) Aiken	−3	−2	−2	−3	−3	−3	−4	−3	−3	−3	−2	−2	−3	−3	−2	−2	−2	−1
(Belgium) Colsaerts	+3	+3	+4	+4	+3	+3	+2	+2	+2	+1	E	E	E	E	E	−1	−1	−1

Cumulative tournament scores, relative to par

Eagle	Birdie	Bogey	Double bogey	Triple bogey+
