= 2014 Masters Tournament =

American golf tournament held in 2014

- Front cover of the 2014 Masters Journal

Tournament information
- Dates: April 10–13, 2014
- Location: Augusta, Georgia, U.S. 33.503°N 82.020°W
- Course: Augusta National Golf Club
- Organized by: Augusta National Golf Club
- Tours: PGA Tour; European Tour; Japan Golf Tour

Statistics
- Par: 72
- Length: 7,435 yards (6,799 m)
- Field: 97 players, 51 after cut
- Cut: 148 (+4)
- Prize fund: US$9,000,000
- Winner's share: $1,620,000

Champion
- (United States) Bubba Watson
- 280 (−8)
- Location in the United States Location in Georgia

The 2014 Masters Tournament was the 78th edition of the Masters Tournament, the first of golf's four major championships in 2014. It was held April 10–13 at Augusta National Golf Club in Augusta, Georgia. Bubba Watson won his second Masters, three shots ahead of runners-up Jonas Blixt and Jordan Spieth; defending champion Adam Scott tied for 14th place.

After world number one Tiger Woods withdrew, three entered Augusta with a chance to leave with the top ranking. Adam Scott needed a two-way tie for third, Henrik Stenson a two-way tie for second, and Jason Day a win. The trio finished T-14, T-14, and T-20, respectively, so Woods remained number one.

== Course ==
Hole	Name	Yards	Par	Hole	Name	Yards	Par
1	Tea Olive	445	4	10	Camellia	495	4
2	Pink Dogwood	575	5	11	White Dogwood	505	4
3	Flowering Peach	350	4	12	Golden Bell	155	3
4	Flowering Crab Apple	240	3	13	Azalea	510	5
5	Magnolia	455	4	14	Chinese Fir	440	4
6	Juniper	180	3	15	Firethorn	530	5
7	Pampas	450	4	16	Redbud	170	3
8	Yellow Jasmine	570	5	17	Nandina	440	4
9	Carolina Cherry	460	4	18	Holly	465	4
Out		3,725	36	In		3,710	36
Source:				Total		7,435	72

== Field ==
The Masters has the smallest field of the four major championships. Officially, the Masters remains an invitation event, but there is a set of qualifying criteria that determines who is included in the field. Each player is classified according to the first category by which he qualified, with other categories in which he qualified shown in parentheses.

Golfers who qualify based solely on their performance in amateur tournaments (categories 6–10) must remain amateurs on the starting day of the tournament to be eligible to play.

1. Past Masters Champions

- Ángel Cabrera (11)
- Fred Couples
- Ben Crenshaw
- Trevor Immelman
- Zach Johnson (15,16,17,18)
- Bernhard Langer
- Sandy Lyle
- Phil Mickelson (3,12,13,15,16,17,18)
- Larry Mize
- José María Olazábal
- Mark O'Meara
- Charl Schwartzel (16,17,18)
- Adam Scott (11,13,15,16,17,18)
- Vijay Singh
- Craig Stadler
- Bubba Watson (15,17,18)
- Tom Watson
- Mike Weir
- Ian Woosnam
- Past champions who did not play: Tommy Aaron, Jack Burke Jr., Billy Casper, Charles Coody, Nick Faldo, Raymond Floyd, Doug Ford, Bob Goalby, Jack Nicklaus, Arnold Palmer, Gary Player, Fuzzy Zoeller. Nicklaus, Palmer, and Player served as "honorary starters" and teed off on the first day at the first hole to kick off the tournament.
- Tiger Woods (5,11,15,16,17,18) did not play due to back surgery.

2. Last five U.S. Open Champions

- Lucas Glover
- Graeme McDowell (15,17,18)
- Rory McIlroy (4,17,18)
- Justin Rose (12,15,16,17,18)
- Webb Simpson (15,16,17,18)

3. Last five British Open Champions

- Stewart Cink
- Darren Clarke
- Ernie Els (12,17,18)
- Louis Oosthuizen (17,18)

4. Last five PGA Champions

- Keegan Bradley (16,17,18)
- Jason Dufner (12,14,15,16,17,18)
- Martin Kaymer (17)
- Yang Yong-eun

5. Last three winners of The Players Championship

- K. J. Choi
- Matt Kuchar (11,15,16,17,18)

6. Top two finishers in the 2013 U.S. Amateur

- Matt Fitzpatrick (a)
- Oliver Goss (a)

7. Winner of the 2013 British Amateur Championship

- Garrick Porteous (a)

8. Winner of the 2013 Asia-Pacific Amateur Championship

- Lee Chang-woo (a)

9. Winner of the 2013 U.S. Amateur Public Links

- Jordan Niebrugge (a)

10. Winner of the 2013 U.S. Mid-Amateur

- Mike McCoy (a)

11. The top 12 finishers and ties in the 2013 Masters Tournament

- Tim Clark
- Jason Day (12,15,16,17,18)
- Sergio García (16,17,18)
- John Huh
- Marc Leishman
- Thorbjørn Olesen
- Brandt Snedeker (15,16,17,18)
- Lee Westwood (13,17,18)

12. Top 4 finishers and ties in the 2013 U.S. Open

- Billy Horschel (15,16,17,18)
- Hunter Mahan (16,17,18)

13. Top 4 finishers and ties in the 2013 British Open Championship

- Ian Poulter (17,18)
- Henrik Stenson (14,15,16,17,18)

14. Top 4 finishers and ties in the 2013 PGA Championship

- Jonas Blixt (15,17)
- Jim Furyk (16,17,18)

15. Winners of PGA Tour events that award a full-point allocation for the season-ending Tour Championship, between the 2013 Masters Tournament and the 2014 Masters Tournament

- Bae Sang-moon
- Steven Bowditch
- Ken Duke
- Harris English (18)
- Derek Ernst
- Matt Every (18)
- Bill Haas (16,17,18)
- Russell Henley (18)
- Dustin Johnson (16,17,18)
- Matt Jones
- Chris Kirk
- Ryan Moore (17,18)
- Patrick Reed (18)
- John Senden
- Jordan Spieth (16,17,18)
- Kevin Stadler
- Scott Stallings
- Jimmy Walker (17,18)
- Boo Weekley (16)

16. All players qualifying for the 2013 edition of The Tour Championship

- Roberto Castro
- Brendon de Jonge
- Graham DeLaet (17,18)
- Luke Donald (17,18)
- D. A. Points
- Kevin Streelman (17,18)
- Steve Stricker (17,18)
- Nick Watney (17,18)
- Gary Woodland (18)

17. Top 50 on the final 2013 Official World Golf Ranking list

- Thomas Bjørn (18)
- Jamie Donaldson (18)
- Victor Dubuisson (18)
- Gonzalo Fernández-Castaño (18)
- Rickie Fowler (18)
- Branden Grace
- Peter Hanson
- Thongchai Jaidee (18)
- Miguel Ángel Jiménez (18)
- Joost Luiten (18)
- David Lynn
- Matteo Manassero
- Hideki Matsuyama (18)
- Francesco Molinari (18)

18. Top 50 on the Official World Golf Ranking list on March 31, 2014

- Stephen Gallacher

19. International invitees

- None

Five players were appearing in their first major: Patrick Reed, Oliver Goss, Lee Chang-woo, Jordan Niebrugge and Mike McCoy. A further 19 were appearing in their first Masters: Jonas Blixt, Steven Bowditch, Roberto Castro, Brendon de Jonge, Graham DeLaet, Victor Dubuisson, Harris English, Derek Ernst, Matt Every, Matt Fitzpatrick, Stephen Gallacher, Billy Horschel, Matt Jones, Chris Kirk, Joost Luiten, Garrick Porteous, Jordan Spieth, Kevin Stadler and Jimmy Walker. The total of 24 Masters debutants was a record, beating the 23 in 1935.

Craig Stadler and Kevin Stadler were the 12th father and son to play in the Masters, but the first to play in the same year.

Tiger Woods had played in 19 consecutive Masters (1995–2013). Also absent was Pádraig Harrington who had appeared in the previous 14 Masters, and in every major in the last eight years.

== Round summaries ==
=== First round ===
Thursday, April 10, 2014

Bill Haas led by a stroke after a 68 on the first day, one shot ahead of Louis Oosthuizen, Bubba Watson, and defending champion Adam Scott. There were 18 players, including Rory McIlroy, Jordan Spieth, Fred Couples and Rickie Fowler, within three shots of the lead after the first round. The weather conditions were near-perfect: clear and calm with temperatures in the mid-70s (24 °C).

Place	Player	Score	To par
1	(United States) Bill Haas	68	−4
T2	(South Africa) Louis Oosthuizen	69	−3
T2	(Australia) Adam Scott	69	−3
T2	(United States) Bubba Watson	69	−3
T5	(Sweden) Jonas Blixt	70	−2
T5	(South Korea) K. J. Choi	70	−2
T5	(Australia) Marc Leishman	70	−2
T5	(United States) Brandt Snedeker	70	−2
T5	(United States) Kevin Stadler	70	−2
T5	(United States) Jimmy Walker	70	−2
T5	(United States) Gary Woodland	70	−2

=== Second round ===
Friday, April 11, 2014

2012 champion Bubba Watson recorded five consecutive birdies on holes 12–16 on his way to a round of 68 (−4) and a three-shot lead after 36 holes. Watson was the only player from the top-10 after the first round to match or better his score in the second round. Joining Watson for the low round of the day (68) were Thomas Bjørn, Jim Furyk and John Senden. Three-time champion Phil Mickelson shot 73 (+1) and missed the cut at the Masters for the first time since 1997.

Place	Player	Score	To par
1	(United States) Bubba Watson	69-68=137	−7
2	(Australia) John Senden	72-68=140	−4
T3	(Denmark) Thomas Bjørn	73-68=141	−3
T3	(Sweden) Jonas Blixt	70-71=141	−3
T3	(Australia) Adam Scott	69-72=141	−3
T3	(United States) Jordan Spieth	71-70=141	−3
T7	(United States) Fred Couples	71-71=142	−2
T7	(United States) Jim Furyk	74-68=142	−2
T7	(United States) Jimmy Walker	70-72=142	−2
T10	(Wales) Jamie Donaldson	73-70=143	−1
T10	(Scotland) Stephen Gallacher	71-72=143	−1
T10	(United States) Russell Henley	73-70=143	−1
T10	(United States) Kevin Stadler	70-73=143	−1
T10	(United States) Kevin Streelman	72-71=143	−1

Amateurs: Goss (+3), Fitzpatrick (+5), Lee (+9), Niebrugge (+11), Porteous (+12), McCoy (+17).

=== Third round ===
Saturday, April 12, 2014

Second round leader Bubba Watson fell back to the field with a two-over-par 74. Jordan Spieth shot another round of 70 to tie Watson for first place at five-under-par. Miguel Ángel Jiménez shot the lowest round of the day, 66 (−6), to move into a tie for fifth place.

Place	Player	Score	To par
T1	(United States) Jordan Spieth	71-70-70=211	−5
T1	(United States) Bubba Watson	69-68-74=211	−5
T3	(Sweden) Jonas Blixt	70-71-71=212	−4
T3	(United States) Matt Kuchar	73-71-68=212	−4
T5	(United States) Rickie Fowler	71-75-67=213	−3
T5	(Spain) Miguel Ángel Jiménez	71-76-66=213	−3
T7	(Denmark) Thomas Bjørn	73-68-73=214	−2
T7	(United States) Jim Furyk	74-68-72=214	−2
T7	(England) Lee Westwood	73-71-70=214	−2
T10	(United States) Fred Couples	71-71-73=215	−1
T10	(England) Justin Rose	76-70-69=215	−1
T10	(Australia) John Senden	72-68-75=215	−1
T10	(United States) Kevin Stadler	70-73-72=215	−1

=== Final round ===
Sunday, April 13, 2014

==== Summary ====
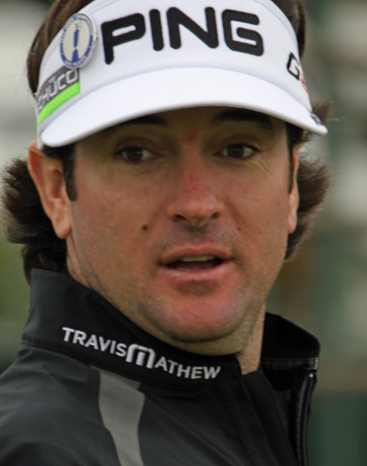
Bubba Watson won his second Masters title

External videos
- Full final round coverage on CBS on YouTube

Bubba Watson shot a 69 in the final round to win the Masters for the second time in three years. Jordan Spieth had taken the lead after a birdie on the second hole, and expanded his lead to 2 shots following a Watson bogey on the third. Spieth held the outright lead until the eighth hole, when Watson scored a birdie to Spieth's bogey. Another Watson birdie and Spieth bogey on the ninth hole gave Watson a two-shot lead, which he never relinquished and won going away, finishing three shots ahead of both Spieth and Swedish golfer Jonas Blixt. Blixt was the only player in the field to post four sub-par rounds. Joost Luiten shot the low round of the day, 67 (−5).

==== Final leaderboard ====
Champion
Silver Cup winner (low amateur)
(a) = amateur
(c) = past champion

Top 10
Place	Player	Score	To par	Money (US$)
1	(United States) Bubba Watson (c)	69-68-74-69=280	−8	1,620,000
T2	(Sweden) Jonas Blixt	70-71-71-71=283	−5	792,000
T2	(United States) Jordan Spieth	71-70-70-72=283	−5	792,000
4	(Spain) Miguel Ángel Jiménez	71-76-66-71=284	−4	432,000
T5	(United States) Rickie Fowler	71-75-67-73=286	−2	342,000
T5	(United States) Matt Kuchar	73-71-68-74=286	−2	342,000
7	(England) Lee Westwood	73-71-70-73=287	−1	301,500
T8	(Denmark) Thomas Bjørn	73-68-73-74=288	E	234,000
T8	(Germany) Bernhard Langer (c)	72-74-73-69=288	E	234,000
T8	(Northern Ireland) Rory McIlroy	71-77-71-69=288	E	234,000
T8	(Australia) John Senden	72-68-75-73=288	E	234,000
T8	(United States) Kevin Stadler	70-73-72-73=288	E	234,000
T8	(United States) Jimmy Walker	70-72-76-70=288	E	234,000

Leaderboard below the top 10
Place	Player	Score	To par	Money ($)
T14	(United States) Stewart Cink	73-72-76-68=289	+1	148,500
T14	(Wales) Jamie Donaldson	73-70-76-70=289	+1	148,500
T14	(United States) Jim Furyk	74-68-72-75=289	+1	148,500
T14	(England) Justin Rose	76-70-69-74=289	+1	148,500
T14	(Australia) Adam Scott (c)	69-72-76-72=289	+1	148,500
T14	(Sweden) Henrik Stenson	73-72-74-70=289	+1	148,500
T20	(United States) Fred Couples (c)	71-71-73-75=290	+2	101,160
T20	(Australia) Jason Day	75-73-70-72=290	+2	101,160
T20	(United States) Bill Haas	68-78-74-70=290	+2	101,160
T20	(United States) Chris Kirk	75-72-71-72=290	+2	101,160
T20	(England) Ian Poulter	76-70-70-74=290	+2	101,160
25	(South Africa) Louis Oosthuizen	69-75-75-72=291	+3	79,200
T26	(Australia) Steven Bowditch	74-72-74-72=292	+4	66,600
T26	(Spain) Gonzalo Fernández-Castaño	75-69-74-74=292	+4	66,600
T26	(Netherlands) Joost Luiten	75-73-77-67=292	+4	66,600
T26	(United States) Hunter Mahan	74-72-74-72=292	+4	66,600
T26	(United States) Gary Woodland	70-77-69-76=292	+4	66,600
T31	(United States) Russell Henley	73-70-75-75=293	+5	55,800
T31	(Germany) Martin Kaymer	75-72-73-73=293	+5	55,800
T31	(United States) Steve Stricker	72-73-73-75=293	+5	55,800
T34	(South Korea) K. J. Choi	70-75-78-71=294	+6	48,600
T34	(Scotland) Stephen Gallacher	71-72-81-70=294	+6	48,600
T34	(Spain) José María Olazábal (c)	74-74-73-73=294	+6	48,600
T37	(Zimbabwe) Brendon de Jonge	74-72-76-73=295	+7	40,500
T37	(United States) Billy Horschel	75-72-75-73=295	+7	40,500
T37	(Thailand) Thongchai Jaidee	73-74-75-73=295	+7	40,500
T37	(Fiji) Vijay Singh (c)	75-71-74-75=295	+7	40,500
T37	(United States) Brandt Snedeker	70-74-80-71=295	+7	40,500
T42	(United States) Lucas Glover	75-69-77-75=296	+8	34,200
T42	(United States) Kevin Streelman	72-71-74-79=296	+8	34,200
T44	(Northern Ireland) Darren Clarke	74-74-73-76=297	+9	27,972
T44	(Scotland) Sandy Lyle (c)	76-72-76-73=297	+9	27,972
T44	(Denmark) Thorbjørn Olesen	74-72-76-75=297	+9	27,972
T44	(United States) Nick Watney	72-75-76-74=297	+9	27,972
T44	(Canada) Mike Weir (c)	73-72-79-73=297	+9	27,972
49	(Australia) Oliver Goss (a)	76-71-76-75=298	+10	0
50	(Italy) Francesco Molinari	71-76-76-76=299	+11	23,400
51	(United States) Larry Mize (c)	74-72-79-79=304	+16	22,680
CUT	(South Korea) Bae Sang-moon	72-77=149	+5	
CUT	(England) Luke Donald	79-70=149	+5	
CUT	(France) Victor Dubuisson	74-75=149	+5	
CUT	(South Africa) Ernie Els	75-74=149	+5	
CUT	(England) Matt Fitzpatrick (a)	76-73=149	+5	
CUT	(Spain) Sergio García	74-75=149	+5	
CUT	(Australia) Marc Leishman	70-79=149	+5	
CUT	(United States) Phil Mickelson (c)	76-73=149	+5	
CUT	(United States) Ryan Moore	77-72=149	+5	
CUT	(South Africa) Charl Schwartzel (c)	73-76=149	+5	
CUT	(United States) Webb Simpson	74-75=149	+5	
CUT	(United States) Harris English	74-76=150	+6	
CUT	(United States) Zach Johnson (c)	78-72=150	+6	
CUT	(Northern Ireland) Graeme McDowell	72-78=150	+6	
CUT	(United States) D. A. Points	78-72=150	+6	
CUT	(Wales) Ian Woosnam (c)	77-73=150	+6	
CUT	(United States) Ken Duke	75-76=151	+7	
CUT	(United States) John Huh	75-76=151	+7	
CUT	(United States) Dustin Johnson	77-74=151	+7	
CUT	(Japan) Hideki Matsuyama	80-71=151	+7	
CUT	(Argentina) Ángel Cabrera (c)	78-74=152	+8	
CUT	(Canada) Graham DeLaet	80-72=152	+8	
CUT	(United States) Derek Ernst	76-76=152	+8	
CUT	(Australia) Matt Jones	74-78=152	+8	
CUT	(England) David Lynn	78-74=152	+8	
CUT	(Italy) Matteo Manassero	71-81=152	+8	
CUT	(United States) Mark O'Meara (c)	75-77=152	+8	
CUT	(United States) Patrick Reed	73-79=152	+8	
CUT	(United States) Keegan Bradley	75-78=153	+9	
CUT	(United States) Roberto Castro	73-80=153	+9	
CUT	(South Africa) Branden Grace	84-69=153	+9	
CUT	(South Africa) Trevor Immelman (c)	79-74=153	+9	
CUT	(South Korea) Lee Chang-woo (a)	80-73=153	+9	
CUT	(United States) Jason Dufner	80-74=154	+10	
CUT	(South Korea) Yang Yong-eun	77-77=154	+10	
CUT	(United States) Matt Every	77-78=155	+11	
CUT	(United States) Jordan Niebrugge (a)	81-74=155	+11	
CUT	(United States) Scott Stallings	75-80=155	+11	
CUT	(England) Garrick Porteous (a)	76-80=156	+12	
CUT	(United States) Boo Weekley	73-83=156	+12	
CUT	(South Africa) Tim Clark	79-78=157	+13	
CUT	(Sweden) Peter Hanson	78-81=159	+15	
CUT	(United States) Craig Stadler (c)	82-77=159	+15	
CUT	(United States) Tom Watson (c)	78-81=159	+15	
CUT	(United States) Mike McCoy (a)	78-83=161	+17	
CUT	(United States) Ben Crenshaw (c)	83-85=168	+24	

==== Scorecard ====
Hole	1	2	3	4	5	6	7	8	9	10	11	12	13	14	15	16	17	18
Par	4	5	4	3	4	3	4	5	4	4	4	3	5	4	5	3	4	4
(United States) Watson	−5	−5	−4	−5	−5	−6	−6	−7	−8	−7	−7	−7	−8	−8	−8	−8	−8	−8
(United States) Spieth	−5	−6	−6	−7	−6	−7	−8	−7	−6	−6	−6	−5	−5	−5	−5	−5	−5	−5
(Sweden) Blixt	−4	−4	−4	−4	−4	−4	−3	−4	−4	−4	−4	−4	−5	−5	−5	−5	−5	−5
(Spain) Jiménez	−2	−3	−2	−2	−1	−1	−1	−1	−1	−2	−1	−2	−2	−3	−3	−4	−4	−4
(United States) Fowler	−4	−3	−3	−3	−3	−3	−3	−3	−3	−2	−1	−1	−1	−2	−2	−2	−2	−2
(United States) Kuchar	−4	−5	−6	−4	−4	−4	−4	−4	−3	−3	−4	−4	−4	−4	−4	−4	−3	−2
