= 2011 Nationwide Tour graduates =

This is a list of players who graduated from the Nationwide Tour in 2011. The top 25 players on the Nationwide Tour's money list in 2011 earned their PGA Tour card for 2012.

	2011 Nationwide Tour		2012 PGA Tour				
Player	Money list rank	Earnings ($)	Starts	Cuts made	Best finish	Money list rank	Earnings
(United States) J. J. Killeen*	1	414,273	33	17	8	157	$414,257
(United States) Ted Potter Jr.*	2	402,470	25	13	Win	62	$1,383,170
(Australia) Mathew Goggin	3	378,492	23	9	T13	177	$259,604
(United States) Jason Kokrak*	4	338,092	27	13	T2	119	$750,221
(Sweden) Jonas Blixt*	5	327,020	21	15	Win	34	$2,255,695
(New Zealand) Danny Lee*	6	326,100	26	13	T16	166	$359,112
(United States) Ken Duke	7	313,241	30	22	T5	57	$1,511,628
(United States) Scott Brown*	8	282,502	23	7	T5 (twice)	148	$478,763
(England) Gary Christian*	9	260,054	28	18	T10	130	$616,457
(Argentina) Miguel Ángel Carballo*	10	258,833	25	13	T24	176	$269,980
(United States) Troy Kelly	11	248,064	25	12	2	116	$786,832
(Scotland) Russell Knox*	12	242,821	23	12	9/T9 (twice)	143	$512,584
(United States) Erik Compton*	13	239,737	26	16	T13	165	$359,765
(United States) John Mallinger	14	237,779	25	13	T2	86	$1,146,852
(United States) Kyle Thompson	15	233,949	22	3	T31	227	$45,460
(United States) Kyle Reifers	16	233,677	27	15	T13	154	$448,960
(Australia) Gavin Coles	17	229,991	23	13	T19	174	$247,561
(United States) Matt Every	18	229,066	25	15	T2 (twice)	40	$1,972,166
(Sweden) Daniel Chopra	19	225,637	21	6	T15	188	$192,198
(United States) Steve Wheatcroft	20	225,054	22	7	T22	199	$135,196
(South Africa) Garth Mulroy	21	201,732	20	10	T22	175	$277,632
(United States) Mark Anderson*	22	188,550	25	13	T9	155	$441,019
(United States) Roberto Castro*	23	186,563	27	19	T7	118	$755,095
(United States) Martin Flores	24	182,612	30	18	6	96	$1,035,569
(United States) Billy Hurley III*	25	180,191	27	8	T4	151	$474,130

*PGA Tour rookie in 2012

Green background indicates the player retained his PGA Tour card for 2013 through a win or finish in the top 125 of the money list.
Yellow background indicates the player did not retain his PGA Tour card for 2013, but retained conditional status (finished between 126 and 150).
Red background indicates the player did not retain his PGA Tour card for 2013 (finished outside the top 150).

== Winners on the PGA Tour in 2012 ==
No.	Date	Player	Tournament	Winning score	Margin of victory	Runner(s)-up
1	Jul 8	(United States) Ted Potter Jr.	Greenbrier Classic	−16 (69-67-64-64=264)	Playoff	(United States) Troy Kelly
2	Oct 14	(Sweden) Jonas Blixt	Frys.com Open	−16 (66-68-66-68=268)	1 stroke	(United States) Jason Kokrak, (United States) Tim Petrovic

== Runners-up on the PGA Tour in 2012 ==
No.	Date	Player	Tournament	Winner	Winning score	Runner-up score
1	Jan 22	(United States) John Mallinger	Humana Challenge	(United States) Mark Wilson	−24 (66-62-67-69=264)	−22 (67-65-68-66=266)
2	Apr 22	(United States) Matt Every	Valero Texas Open	(United States) Ben Curtis	−9 (67-67-73-72=279)	−7 (63-74-73-71=281)
3	Jul 8	(United States) Troy Kelly	Greenbrier Classic	(United States) Ted Potter Jr. (Won on third playoff hole)	−16 (69-67-64-64=264)	−16 (69-67-62-66=264)
4	Oct 14	(United States) Jason Kokrak	Frys.com Open	(Sweden) Jonas Blixt	−16 (66-68-66-68=268)	−15 (68-66-67-68=269)
5	Nov 11	(United States) Matt Every	Children's Miracle Network Classic	(United States) Charlie Beljan	−16 (68-64-71-69=272)	−14 (67-69-70-68=274)

== See also ==
- 2011 PGA Tour Qualifying School graduates
