= Troy Kelly =

American golfer

Personal information
- Nationality: United States
- Born: August 2, 1978 (age 48) Tacoma, Washington, U.S.
- Height: 6 ft 2 in (1.88 m)
- Weight: 210 lb (95 kg; 15 st)

Career
- Sport: Golf
- College: University of Washington
- Turned professional: 2003
- Current tour: PGA Tour
- Former tours: Nationwide Tour; Canadian Tour; Gateway Tour
- Professional wins: 3+

Best results in major championships
- Masters Tournament: DNP
- PGA Championship: DNP
- U.S. Open: T39: 2015
- The Open Championship: CUT: 2012

Troy Kelly (born August 2, 1978) is an American professional golfer who plays on the PGA Tour.

== Amateur career ==
Kelly became the youngest player to ever compete in Washington State Junior Golf Association (WJGA) tournaments at the age of 6. He was the WJGA state champion at age 11 and 13. He won more than 40 tournaments in his junior golf career. He turned professional after graduating from the University of Washington in 2003.

== Professional career ==
Kelly played on mini tours from 2003 to 2008. He played on the Gateway Tour in 2003, 2005 and 2006 where he won two events. He played on the Golden State Tour in 2007 and 2008, where he won multiple events. Kelly also won the AG Spanos California Open on the AG Spanos Tour in 2006. He also played on the Canadian Tour in 2008.

Kelly joined the PGA Tour in 2009, earning his card through qualifying school. He struggled, making only 3 of 17 cuts. He also played in 10 Nationwide Tour events that year and finished second at the Chattanooga Classic. In 2010, he played only 10 Nationwide Tour events due to an arthritic hip. In 2011 he recorded four top-10 finishes, including two runner-up finishes and a third-place finish en route to finishing 11th on the money list, good enough for a 2012 PGA Tour card.

Kelly didn't find any success in 2012 until the Greenbrier Classic in July. He was in position to win but Ted Potter Jr. shot 4-under-par on the last four holes to force a playoff. Potter defeated Kelly on the third extra hole. Prior to the playoff loss, Kelly had never finished better than 37th on the PGA Tour and was ranked 464th in the Official World Golf Ranking. The second-place finish vaulted Kelly to 167th in the world, 187th to 104th in the FedEx Cup, and earned him a spot in the 2012 Open Championship, where he would miss the cut.

== Professional wins (3+) ==
=== Gateway Tour wins (2) ===
No.	Date	Tournament	Winning score	Margin of victory	Runner-up
1	Apr 14, 2005	Desert Spring 8	−11 (64-67-64=195)	2 strokes	(United States) Steve Gilley
2	Mar 22, 2006	Desert Spring B2	−20 (61-67-68=196)	1 stroke	(United States) Brady Stockton

=== Other wins (1+) ===
- 2006 AG Spanos California Open (AG Spanos Tour)
- Unknown number of wins on Golden State Tour

== Playoff record ==
PGA Tour playoff record (0–1)

No.	Year	Tournament	Opponent	Result
1	2012	Greenbrier Classic	(United States) Ted Potter Jr.	Lost to birdie on third extra hole

== Results in major championships ==
Tournament	2005	2006	2007	2008	2009	2010	2011	2012	2013	2014	2015
Masters Tournament											
U.S. Open	CUT										T39
The Open Championship								CUT			
PGA Championship											

Did not play

CUT = missed the half-way cut
"T" = tied

== See also ==
- 2008 PGA Tour Qualifying School graduates
- 2011 Nationwide Tour graduates
