= Ted Potter Jr. =

American professional golfer (born 1983)

Personal information
- Full name: Theodore Charles Potter Jr.
- Nickname: The Wizard
- Nationality: United States
- Born: November 9, 1983 (age 42) Ocala, Florida, U.S.
- Height: 5 ft 10 in (1.78 m)
- Weight: 200 lb (91 kg; 14 st)
- Spouse: Cheri Potter (married 2013)

Career
- Sport: Golf
- Turned professional: 2002
- Current tours: PGA Tour (past champion status)
- Former tours: NGA Hooters Tour; Moonlight Tour; FPG Tour; Web.com Tour
- Professional wins: 19+
- Highest ranking: 73 (February 11, 2018) (as of October 25, 2026)

Number of wins by tour
- PGA Tour: 2
- Korn Ferry Tour: 2
- Other: 15+

Best results in major championships
- Masters Tournament: CUT: 2013, 2018
- PGA Championship: T71: 2018
- U.S. Open: CUT: 2013, 2017, 2018
- The Open Championship: T60: 2012

Achievements and awards
- NGA Hooters Tour Player of the Year: 2006, 2009

Theodore Charles Potter Jr. (born November 9, 1983) is an American professional golfer who plays on the PGA Tour. He is a left-handed golfer, but is naturally right-handed. He is a two-time winner on the PGA Tour, having also won twice on the Web.com Tour. He is often described as a career journeyman golfer and mini-tour legend, due to his dominance of numerous minor league golf tours.

== Early life ==
Potter was born in Ocala, Florida, and resided the majority of his childhood in nearby Silver Springs. He is the son of Ted Potter Sr. and Dale Potter. His father is a retired golf course maintenance professional who worked at Silver Springs Shores Country Club and various Ocala area courses. His mother currently still works for Walmart as a Department Manager. He began to play golf at a very early age. His father made him a custom set of clubs as soon as he could grip one and was his chief instructor of the game.

Potter would go on to dominate Florida youth golf tours, winning numerous events. His success continued through his high school career. He won all-district honors three times in high school. He graduated in 2002 from Lake Weir High School in southeastern Marion County and chose to turn pro instead of attending college.

== Professional career ==
=== Mini-tours career ===
Potter turned pro at the age of 19 and first competed on the Central Florida-based Moonlight Tour. He supplemented his income working in the cart barn at Lake Diamond Golf & Country Club in Ocala, Florida. Potter is estimated to have over 60 mini-tour victories at various levels of competition.

Potter was the 2006 and 2009 NGA Hooters Tour Player of the Year. He has a total of seven regular season wins and five winter series victories on the NGA Tour. He is currently tied for third place all-time in wins. His career winnings on the NGA tour are $595,490.72 (623,000 including winter series events).

=== 2003–2011: Nationwide Tour career ===
In December 2003, he competed for a spot on the PGA Tour via the PGA Tour Qualifying Tournament. He finished tied for 74th place and earned a spot on the 2004 Nationwide Tour (former name of the Web.com Tour), where he did not make a single cut during the season.

Potter again competed on the Nationwide Tour during the 2007 season with little success. He made his first cut on the Nationwide Tour at the 2007 Movistar Panama Championship, where he finished tied for 12th place. Overall, he entered 20 events during the 2007 season, making only three cuts and earning a total of $16,014 to finish in 189th place. He did not regain his Nationwide Tour card and returned to mini-tour competition for 2008 and 2009.

Potter regained his Nationwide Tour card again in 2010. He entered 11 events making only three cuts and finished in 148th place. He did not regain his Nationwide Tour card and returned to mini-tour competition again for the start of 2011.

The 2011 season was Potter's breakout as a professional golfer. He started the season on the NGA Tour, but won the South Georgia Classic on what was then the Nationwide Tour, the first time a Monday qualifier won on the tour since 2006. Prior to winning the South Georgia Classic, Potter made six cuts in 55 Web.com Tour events. He was only the fifth left-handed golfer to win an event on the tour and the first since 2008. The win earned Potter $112,500 and full Nationwide Tour status for 2011. He earned his second win of the season at the Soboba Golf Classic in a three-hole playoff. Potter finished in the Top 25 (2nd place overall) in earnings on the tour in 2011 and earned his PGA Tour card for the 2012 season. Overall, he entered 18 Nationwide Tour events in 2011, making the cut 12 times with six finishes in the Top 10.

=== 2012: PGA Tour rookie season and maiden win ===
Potter made his PGA Tour debut at the Sony Open in Hawaii in January 2012, where he finished in a tie for 13th. He achieved his first PGA Tour win at the Greenbrier Classic on July 8 of that year, after having missed the previous five cuts. Potter trailed Troy Kelly by several strokes but shot 4-under par on the last four holes to force a playoff. Potter, ranked number 218 in the Official World Golf Ranking at the time, went on to win the playoff on the third extra hole, after missing a birdie putt to win on the second extra hole. Potter was 173rd in the FedEx Cup before the win, which vaulted him to 51st in the FedEx Cup and 83rd in the world. He also qualified for the 2012 Open Championship, his first major championship appearance, as a result of winning the tournament. He also earned a two-year exemption, plus invitations to the 2012 PGA Championship, 2012 Bridgestone Invitational, and 2013 Masters Tournament.

Potter made his debut in a major championship at the 2012 Open Championship where he finished in a tie for 60th place. For the season, he finished with 652 FedEx Cup points (93rd place) and second in voting for PGA Tour Rookie of the Year.

=== 2013–2016: PGA Tour and ankle injury ===
Potter followed a successful rookie campaign with a solid second season on tour. During the 2013 season, Potter entered 22 events and made 11 cuts including two Top 10 finishes and five Top 25 finishes. He earned 518 FedEx Cup points, finishing in 105th place and had $829,770 in earnings for the season. His best performance of the 2013 season was at the Greenbrier Classic, where he finished in 6th place with a score of 271 (−9).

Potter struggled during the 2014 season, missing the cut in 15 of 24 events entered and earning a total of $386,341. He had three Top 25 finishes. Potter's season ended in July with an off-course ankle injury while at a hotel during the RBC Canadian Open.

Potter's broken his ankle kept him out of play until April 2016. After making five allotted Web.com Tour rehab starts, he tried to regain PGA Tour privileges with the last two starts of his major medical extension.

=== 2016–2017: Return to Web.com Tour ===
After failing to meet the terms of his medical extension, he returned to the Web.com Tour for the remainder of the 2016 season, where he finished 50th on the money list. He entered 14 tournaments and made 12 cuts. He regained his Web.com Tour card for the following season.

With only past champion status on the PGA Tour during the 2017 season, Potter spent much of that year on the Web.com Tour. During the 2017 season, Potter entered 22 tournaments, making the cut a total of 15 times including six Top 10 finishes. His best finishes during his 2017 campaign included second place at the Rust-Oleum Championship and another second place (tie) at the Albertsons Boise Open. Potter finished in the Top 25 (14th overall) on the Web.com Tour and re-earned full status for the 2018 season.

He qualified for the 2017 U.S. Open, where he failed to make the cut. He entered the PGA Tour's 2017 Greenbrier Classic as a past champion, where he finished in a tie for 37th place.

=== 2017–2018: Return to PGA Tour ===
Potter began the 2017–18 season missing five of the first eight cuts. In February 2018, Potter won his second PGA Tour title at the AT&T Pebble Beach Pro-Am with a three-shot victory over Dustin Johnson, Jason Day, Phil Mickelson, and Chez Reavie, earning a two-year PGA Tour exemption through 2019–20 season and invitations to the 2018 Masters Tournament and 2018 PGA Championship. During the third round of the tournament, he shot his personal best score of 62 on the PGA Tour. The win catapulted him from 243 to a career-best 73 in the Official World Golf Ranking.

== Personal life ==
Potter currently resides in Ocala, Florida, with his wife Cheri Renee Potter. He has one son, Corbin, born in 2016 and a daughter, Adelynn, born in 2019. He has one sibling, Stephanie Potter (Smith).

He is an avid fisherman and hunter.

== Awards and honors ==
- In 2006 and 2009, Potter earned NGA Hooters Tour Player of the Year honors.

== Professional wins (19+) ==
=== PGA Tour wins (2) ===
No.	Date	Tournament	Winning score	Margin of victory	Runner(s)-up
1	Jul 8, 2012	Greenbrier Classic	−16 (69-67-64-64=264)	Playoff	(United States) Troy Kelly
2	Feb 11, 2018	AT&T Pebble Beach Pro-Am	−17 (68-71-62-69=270)	3 strokes	(Australia) Jason Day, (United States) Dustin Johnson, (United States) Phil Mickelson, (United States) Chez Reavie

PGA Tour playoff record (1–0)

No.	Year	Tournament	Opponent	Result
1	2012	Greenbrier Classic	(United States) Troy Kelly	Won with birdie on third extra hole

=== Nationwide Tour wins (2) ===
No.	Date	Tournament	Winning score	Margin of victory	Runner(s)-up
1	May 1, 2011	South Georgia Classic	−16 (70-69-65-68=272)	3 strokes	(Australia) Mathew Goggin
2	Sep 25, 2011	Soboba Golf Classic	−14 (70-68-67-66=270)	Playoff	(United States) Andres Gonzales, (Argentina) Miguel Ángel Carballo

Nationwide Tour playoff record (1–0)

No.	Year	Tournament	Opponents	Result
1	2011	Soboba Golf Classic	(United States) Andres Gonzales, (Argentina) Miguel Ángel Carballo	Won with birdie on second extra hole Carballo eliminated by birdie on first hole

=== NGA Hooters Tour wins (7) ===
No.	Date	Tournament	Winning score	Margin of victory	Runner-up
1	Aug 20, 2006	Dothan Classic	−22 (65-64-68-69=266)	11 strokes	(United States) Jesse Hutchins
2	Sep 10, 2006	Michelob Ultra Classic	−18 (67-67-64-72=270)	1 stroke	(United States) Todd Bailey
3	Mar 8, 2009	Amelia Island Plantation NGA Classic	−15 (68-69-69-67=273)	2 strokes	(United States) Stephen Shellock
4	Jun 14, 2009	Gold Strike Casino Golf Classic	−21 (69-68-63-67=267)	6 strokes	(United States) Travis Bertoni
5	Jun 21, 2009	Buffalo Run Casino Classic	−20 (70-68-65-65=268)	Playoff	(United States) Martin Flores
6	Mar 6, 2011	Killearn Country Club Classic	−25 (66-66-64-67=263)	7 strokes	(United States) Lee Williams
7	Mar 13, 2011	Harley-Davidson of Ocala Classic	−16 (72-67-67-66=272)	2 strokes	(United States) Jesse Hutchins

=== Other wins (8+) ===
- 2002 Marion Masters (as an amateur)
- 2008 Rio Pinar CC Winter Event, Rock Springs Ridge Winter Event (NGA Hooters Tour Winter Series)
- 2010 Ocala Open (FPG Tour), Rio Pinar CC, Sugarloaf Mountain, Forest Lake GC (NGA Hooters Tour Winter Series)
- 2011 Ocala Open (FPG Tour)
- Numerous Moonlight Tour and Florida Professional Golf Tour wins

== Results in major championships ==
Tournament	2012	2013	2014	2015	2016	2017	2018
Masters Tournament		CUT					CUT
U.S. Open		CUT				CUT	CUT
The Open Championship	T60						
PGA Championship	CUT						T71

Did not play

CUT = missed the half-way cut
"T" indicates a tie for a place

== Results in The Players Championship ==
Tournament	2013	2014	2015	2016	2017	2018	2019
The Players Championship	CUT	CUT				T41	CUT

Did not play

CUT = missed the halfway cut
"T" indicates a tie for a place

== Results in World Golf Championships ==
Results not in chronological order before 2015.

Tournament	2012	2013	2014	2015	2016	2017	2018
Championship							
Match Play							
Invitational	73						T48
Champions							

Did not play

QF, R16, R32, R64 = Round in which player lost in match play
"T" = Tied

== See also ==
- 2011 Nationwide Tour graduates
- 2017 Web.com Tour Finals graduates
