= Jonas Blixt =

Swedish professional golfer

Personal information
- Full name: Jonas Fredrik Blixt Berglund
- Nationality: Sweden
- Born: 24 April 1984 (age 42) Nässjö, Sweden
- Height: 5 ft 10 in (1.78 m)
- Weight: 164 lb (74 kg; 11.7 st)

Career
- Sport: Golf
- College: Florida State University
- Turned professional: 2008
- Current tour: Challenge Tour
- Former tours: PGA Tour; European Tour; Nationwide Tour
- Professional wins: 4
- Highest ranking: 33 (13 April 2014)

Number of wins by tour
- PGA Tour: 3
- Other: 1

Best results in major championships
- Masters Tournament: T2: 2014
- PGA Championship: 4th: 2013
- U.S. Open: CUT: 2014, 2022
- The Open Championship: T26: 2013

Jonas Fredrik Blixt Berglund (born 24 April 1984) is a Swedish professional golfer who currently plays on the PGA Tour. He is a three-time winner on the PGA Tour, with his most recent win coming at the 2017 Zurich Classic of New Orleans.

== Amateur career ==
Blixt was born in Nässjö, in the province of Småland, Sweden, but moved with his parents to Karlstad in the province of Värmland. Representing Hammarö Golf Club, he won the 2003 Swedish Junior Stroke-play Championship at Finspång Golf Club and the 2005 Swedish Junior Match-play Championship at Ängsö Golf Club. He also won the 2003 Nordic Championship individually as well as with the Swedish team.

He represented Sweden twice at the European Boys' Team Championship, in 2001 in the winning team, and twice at the European Amateur Team Championship.

He played golf at Florida State University during which time he was a second-team All-American selection in 2007 and a first-team All-American in 2008. He was All-ACC as a junior and a first team All-ACC in 2008. He was a Ping All Southeast Region in 2008. He won the 2007 Inverness intercollegiate event and had five top fives along with two sixth-place finishes at other collegiate events in 2008. He won four career collegiate events and was a 2008 all-Nicklaus honoree.

Blixt competed in the Palmer Cup in 2007 and 2008.

== Professional career ==
Blixt turned professional in 2008 and competed in one Nationwide Tour event that season. In 2009, Blixt competed in more than 20 events, earning over $120,000. Although primarily based in the United States, he also played on the European Challenge Tour.

Blixt earned a place on the PGA Tour in 2012 by finishing fifth on the Nationwide Tour standings in the 2011 season. In May 2012, Blixt finished in a tie for third at the HP Byron Nelson Championship, having been tied for the lead until he bogeyed the 71st hole. After the Memorial Tournament in June, Blixt missed two months of the season due to a rib injury. He started the PGA Tour Fall Series well with another third-place finish at the Justin Timberlake Shriners Hospitals for Children Open.

The following week at the 2012 Frys.com Open, Blixt beat rookie Jason Kokrak and veteran Tim Petrovic by one stroke for his maiden PGA Tour win in his 19th PGA Tour start.

In a rare visit to Sweden, he finished runner-up at the European Tour tournament Nordea Masters at Bro Hof Slott Golf Club in June 2013. A month later, Blixt won again, this time the Greenbrier Classic by two strokes over four players, including Johnson Wagner, who was four ahead of Blixt after three rounds. Blixt finished in fourth place at the 2013 PGA Championship.

Blixt played in the 2014 Masters Tournament, his first visit to Augusta, and finished in a tie for second place with Jordan Spieth, three shots behind Bubba Watson. He played all four rounds under par, shooting 70-71-71-71 for a five-under-par total. The result elevated Blixt to a career-high of 33rd in the Official World Golf Ranking.

In 2015, Blixt was added as a new golfer on EA Sports' Rory McIlroy PGA Tour Game.

On 1 May 2017, Blixt partnered with Cameron Smith to win the Zurich Classic of New Orleans, the first team event on the PGA Tour since 1981. The pair did not make a bogey during the tournament and defeated Scott Brown and Kevin Kisner in a playoff. It was Blixt's third career PGA Tour win.

During the 2017–18 season, Blixt only had one top-25 finish in 23 events, and finished 173rd in the FedEx Cup points list. He still retained full playing privileges for the following season due to his 2017 Zurich Classic of New Orleans victory.

Blixt barely held onto his PGA Tour card during the 2018–19 season after he finished 124th on the FedEx Cup points list. He had 4 top-25 finishes, including a solo 5th at the Charles Schwab Challenge.

Due to medical issues, Blixt only competed in 8 events during the 2020–21 season, and finished 222nd on the FedEx Cup points list.

== Amateur wins ==
- 2002 Wermland Junior Open
- 2003 Swedish Junior Strokeplay Championship, Nordic Amateur Championship
- 2005 Gator Invitational, Wermland Junior Open, Swedish Junior Matchplay Championship
- 2006 Shoal Creek Intercollegiate
- 2007 Inverness Intercollegiate, ACC Championship

== Professional wins (4) ==
=== PGA Tour wins (3) ===
| No. | Date | Tournament | Winning score | To par | Margin of victory | Runners-up |
|---|---|---|---|---|---|---|
| 1 | 14 Oct 2012 | Frys.com Open | 66-68-66-68=268 | −16 | 1 stroke | (United States) Jason Kokrak, (United States) Tim Petrovic |
| 2 | 7 Jul 2013 | Greenbrier Classic | 66-67-67-67=267 | −13 | 2 strokes | (Australia) Steven Bowditch, (Australia) Matt Jones, (United States) Johnson Wagner, (United States) Jimmy Walker |
| 3 | 1 May 2017 | Zurich Classic of New Orleans (with (Australia) Cameron Smith) | 67-62-68-64=261 | −27 | Playoff | (United States) Scott Brown and (United States) Kevin Kisner |

PGA Tour playoff record (1–0)

| No. | Year | Tournament | Opponents | Result |
|---|---|---|---|---|
| 1 | 2017 | Zurich Classic of New Orleans (with (Australia) Cameron Smith) | (United States) Scott Brown and (United States) Kevin Kisner | Won with birdie on fourth extra hole |

=== Other wins (1) ===
| No. | Date | Tournament | Winning score | Margin of victory | Runners-up |
|---|---|---|---|---|---|
| 1 | 4 Jul 2008 | Lyckorna Scratch | −7 (70-67=137) | 4 strokes | (Sweden) Pontus Leijon, (Sweden) Claes Nilsson |

== Results in major championships ==
Results not in chronological order in 2020.

| Tournament | 2013 | 2014 | 2015 | 2016 | 2017 | 2018 |
|---|---|---|---|---|---|---|
| Masters Tournament | | T2 | T28 | | | |
| U.S. Open | | CUT | | | | |
| The Open Championship | T26 | CUT | CUT | | | CUT |
| PGA Championship | 4 | T35 | | CUT | CUT | |

| Tournament | 2019 | 2020 | 2021 | 2022 |
|---|---|---|---|---|
| Masters Tournament | | | | |
| PGA Championship | | | | |
| U.S. Open | | | | CUT |
| The Open Championship | | NT | | |

Top 10
Did not play

CUT = missed the half-way cut
"T" = tied
NT = No tournament due to the COVID-19 pandemic

=== Summary ===
| Tournament | Wins | 2nd | 3rd | Top-5 | Top-10 | Top-25 | Events | Cuts made |
|---|---|---|---|---|---|---|---|---|
| Masters Tournament | 0 | 1 | 0 | 1 | 1 | 1 | 2 | 2 |
| U.S. Open | 0 | 0 | 0 | 0 | 0 | 0 | 2 | 0 |
| The Open Championship | 0 | 0 | 0 | 0 | 0 | 0 | 4 | 1 |
| PGA Championship | 0 | 0 | 0 | 1 | 1 | 1 | 4 | 2 |
| Totals | 0 | 1 | 0 | 2 | 2 | 2 | 12 | 5 |

- Most consecutive cuts made – 3 (2013 Open Championship – 2014 Masters)
- Longest streak of top-10s – 2 (2013 PGA – 2014 Masters)

== Results in The Players Championship ==
| Tournament | 2013 | 2014 | 2015 | 2016 | 2017 | 2018 |
|---|---|---|---|---|---|---|
| The Players Championship | 77 | T75 | CUT | T19 | CUT | CUT |

CUT = missed the halfway cut
"T" indicates a tie for a place

== Results in World Golf Championships ==
| Tournament | 2013 | 2014 |
|---|---|---|
| Match Play | | R32 |
| Championship | | T16 |
| Invitational | T59 | T58 |
| Champions | T63 | T14 |

Did not play

QF, R16, R32, R64 = Round in which player lost in match play
"T" = tied

== Team appearances ==
Amateur

- European Boys' Team Championship (representing Sweden): 2001 (winners), 2002
- European Youths' Team Championship (representing Sweden): 2004
- European Amateur Team Championship (representing Sweden): 2005, 2007
- Palmer Cup (representing Europe): 2007, 2008 (winners)

Professional

- World Cup (representing Sweden): 2013

== See also ==
- 2011 Nationwide Tour graduates
- List of Florida State Seminoles men's golfers
