= Martin Flores =

American professional golfer

Personal information
- Full name: Martin Thomas Flores
- Nationality: United States
- Born: February 17, 1982 (age 44) Fort Worth, Texas, U.S.
- Height: 6 ft 0 in (1.83 m)
- Weight: 170 lb (77 kg; 12 st)

Career
- Sport: Golf
- College: University of Oklahoma
- Turned professional: 2004
- Current tour: Web.com Tour
- Former tour: PGA Tour
- Professional wins: 1

Number of wins by tour
- Korn Ferry Tour: 1

Best results in major championships
- Masters Tournament: DNP
- PGA Championship: DNP
- U.S. Open: CUT: 2012
- The Open Championship: DNP

Martin Thomas Flores (born February 17, 1982) is an American professional golfer who has played seven seasons on the PGA Tour, but is currently playing on the Web.com Tour.

== Career ==
Flores joined the PGA Tour in 2010, earning his card through qualifying school. He struggled during his rookie year on Tour and finished 175th on the money list. His best finish came at the Reno-Tahoe Open where he tied for tenth. He joined the Nationwide Tour in 2011 and recorded four top-10 finishes including a runner-up finish at the Rex Hospital Open. He finished 24th on the money list, good enough for a PGA Tour card for 2012.

In both 2012 and 2013, Flores managed to make the FedEx Cup Playoffs and finish in the top-100 in points to retain his tour card; carding five top-10s between the 2 seasons. In 2014 he scored an additional top-10 (his career-best finish of 3rd at the Wells Fargo Championship) and finished the season 112th in points, which was good enough to retain his tour card.

However, in 2015 Flores had a tough season with many missed-cuts in his 30 starts. He missed the playoffs, finished the season 156th, and lost his tour card. Flores returned to the Web.com Tour in 2016, where he achieved his first professional victory at the Lincoln Land Championship, and earned back his PGA Tour card by finishing 5th on the final money list.

Back on the PGA Tour in 2017, Flores carded two top-10s in 27 starts, which was good enough to finish 102nd in points and keep his card. In 2018 Flores had one of his worst season on the PGA Tour despite making 29 starts, finishing 164th and losing his playing rights. He has returned to the Web.com Tour in 2019.

== Professional wins (1) ==
=== Web.com Tour wins (1) ===
No.	Date	Tournament	Winning score	Margin of victory	Runners-up
1	Jul 17, 2016	Lincoln Land Charity Championship	−22 (66-64-65-67=262)	2 strokes	(United States) Wesley Bryan, (United States) J. T. Poston, (United States) Jonathan Randolph, (United States) Casey Wittenberg

== See also ==
- 2009 PGA Tour Qualifying School graduates
- 2011 Nationwide Tour graduates
- 2016 Web.com Tour Finals graduates
