= Matt Every =

American professional golfer (born 1983)

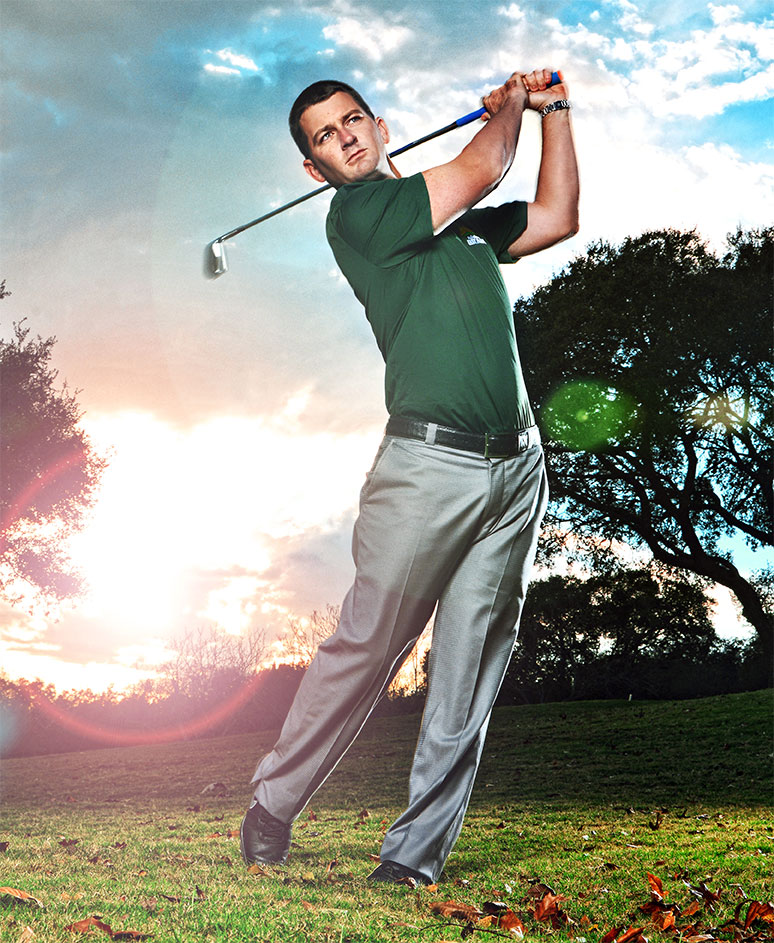

Personal information
- Full name: Matthew King Every
- Nationality: United States
- Born: December 4, 1983 (age 42) Daytona Beach, Florida, U.S.
- Height: 5 ft 11 in (1.80 m)
- Weight: 190 lb (86 kg)
- Spouse: Danielle Every
- Children: 2

Career
- Sport: Golf
- College: University of Florida
- Turned professional: 2006
- Current tours: PGA Tour (past champion status)
- Former tour: Nationwide Tour
- Professional wins: 3
- Highest ranking: 40 (March 22, 2015)

Number of wins by tour
- PGA Tour: 2
- Korn Ferry Tour: 1

Best results in major championships
- Masters Tournament: CUT: 2014, 2015
- PGA Championship: 71st: 2012
- U.S. Open: T28: 2005
- The Open Championship: 71st: 2014

Achievements and awards
- Ben Hogan Award: 2006

Matthew King Every (born December 4, 1983) is an American professional golfer who has won on both the PGA Tour and Nationwide Tour.

== Early life ==
In 1983, Every was born in Daytona Beach, Florida. He attended Mainland High School in Daytona Beach, where he played for the Mainland Buccaneers men's golf team. He was recognized as the Volusia County Golfer of the Year for four consecutive years, and was an all-state selection after his junior and senior seasons.

== Amateur career ==
Every accepted an athletic scholarship to attend the University of Florida in Gainesville, Florida, where he played for coach Buddy Alexander's Florida Gators men's golf team in National Collegiate Athletic Association (NCAA) competition from 2003 to 2006.

During his career as a Gator golfer, he was a three-time first-team All-Southeastern Conference (SEC) selection (2004, 2005, 2006), and a four-time All-American (2003, 2004, 2005, 2006). As an amateur, he played in the 2005 U.S. Open at Pinehurst in North Carolina and finished in a tie for 28th place. He was the recipient of the Ben Hogan Award, recognizing the best college golfer in the United States in 2006.

== Professional career ==
In 2006, Every turned professional after completing his NCAA eligibility. Before he found success on any major golf tour after turning professional, he competed on The Golf Channel's original series The Big Break, in Mesquite, Nevada. Every played in a select few PGA Tour and Nationwide Tour events between 2006 and 2007. Then at Q-School in December 2007, he missed a place on the PGA Tour by just two strokes, but was rewarded with a place on the Nationwide Tour in 2008. In his second start in 2008, he finished runner-up in the Mexico Open. He finished the season with four top-10 finishes and made $180,000 in earnings, just outside the top 25 in earnings.

In his 2009 sophomore year on the Nationwide Tour, Every was ranked forty-ninth on the money list going into the Nationwide Tour Championship, needing a third-place finish or better to obtain his PGA Tour card for 2010. He had made fifteen of twenty-five cuts and had three top-10 finishes entering the season's final event. He shot a second-round 63 to take the 36-hole lead, a lead he did not relinquish. He won the event by three shots over Nationwide Tour money leader Michael Sim. The win vaulted him to tenth on the money list, and qualifying him as a PGA Tour rookie for 2010.

However, in 2010 Every finished 140th and dropped back to the Nationwide Tour for 2011. He finished 2011 in 18th place and returned to the PGA Tour, where he has remained through 2015.

Every was one of three men arrested in a hotel in Bettendorf, Iowa and charged with possession of marijuana on July 6, 2010. In a statement, he denied possessing the drug but apologized for poor judgment. He was subsequently suspended for 90 days from the Tour.

Every earned his first PGA Tour win at the 2014 Arnold Palmer Invitational and would earn his first Masters invitation. He would go on to defend his title at the 2015 event.

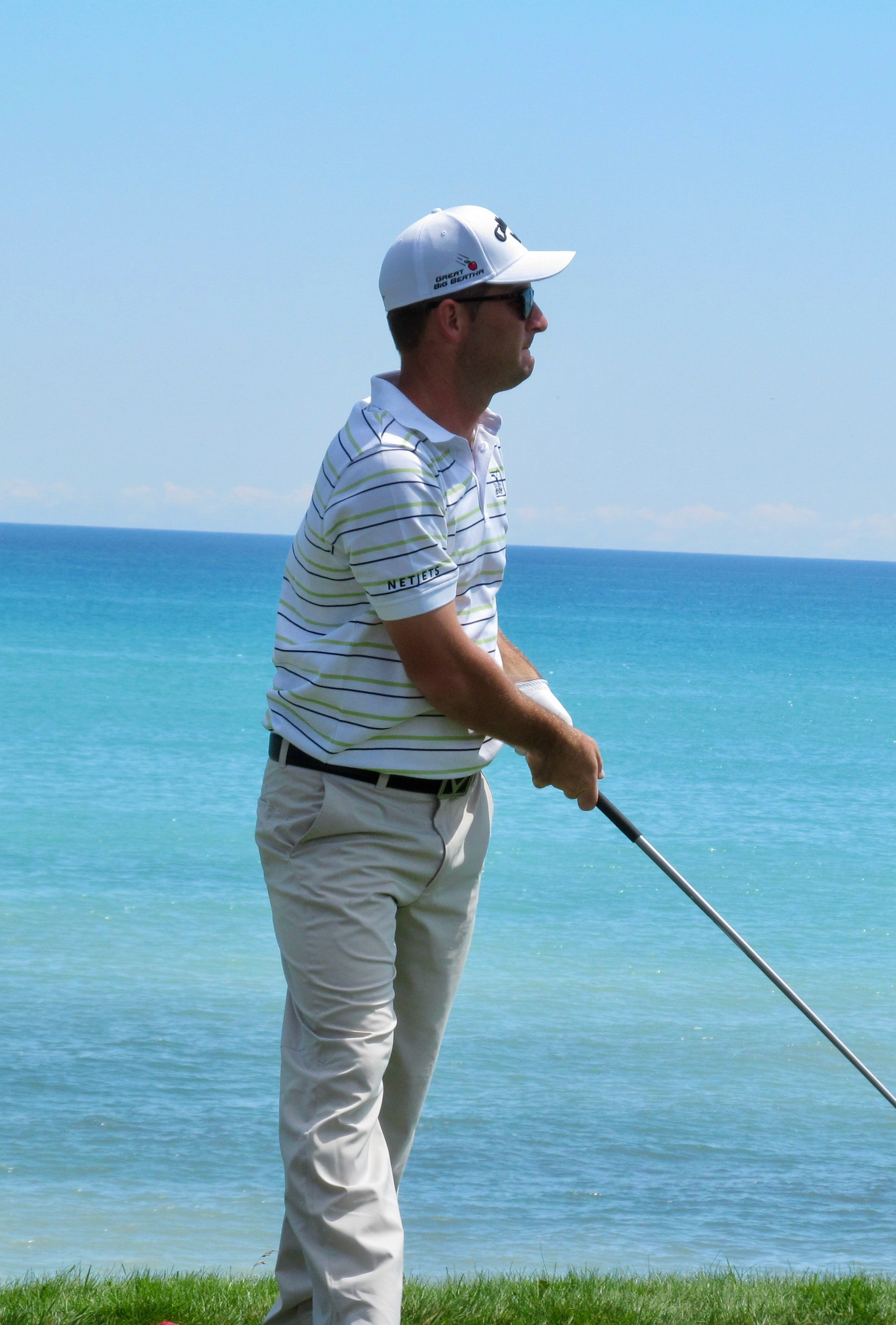
Every at the 2015 PGA Championship

On October 18, 2019, it was announced that Every had been suspended by the PGA Tour for three months for violating its conduct policy for drugs of abuse.

== Personal life ==
Every is a fan of the British group Oasis. He named his son after Liam Gallagher and has a tattoo on his right bicep with "Live Forever," which is the title of an Oasis song. His daughter Quinn Palmer is named after the site of his first PGA Tour win.

== Awards and honors ==
In 2006, Every earned the Ben Hogan Award, as the best college golf player of the year in the United States.

== Professional wins (3) ==
=== PGA Tour wins (2) ===
No.	Date	Tournament	Winning score	To par	Margin of victory	Runner-up
1	Mar 23, 2014	Arnold Palmer Invitational	69-70-66-70=275	−13	1 stroke	(United States) Keegan Bradley
2	Mar 22, 2015	Arnold Palmer Invitational (2)	68-66-69-66=269	−19	1 stroke	(Sweden) Henrik Stenson

=== Nationwide Tour wins (1) ===
Legend
Tour Championships (1)
Other Nationwide Tour (0)

No.	Date	Tournament	Winning score	To par	Margin of victory	Runner-up
1	Oct 25, 2009	Nationwide Tour Championship	70-63-67-67=267	−21	3 strokes	(Australia) Michael Sim

== Results in major championships ==
Tournament	2005	2006	2007	2008	2009	2010	2011	2012	2013	2014	2015
Masters Tournament										CUT	CUT
U.S. Open	T28LA									CUT	WD
The Open Championship										71	CUT
PGA Championship								71	CUT	CUT	CUT

Did not play

CUT = missed the half-way cut
"T" = tied for place

== Results in The Players Championship ==
Tournament	2012	2013	2014	2015	2016	2017
The Players Championship	CUT	T26	CUT	T42	CUT	CUT

CUT = missed the halfway cut
"T" indicates a tie for a place

== Results in World Golf Championships ==
Results not in chronological order before 2015.

Tournament	2014	2015
Championship		
Match Play		T52
Invitational	T47	74
Champions	T56	

Did not play

"T" = Tied

== U.S. national team appearances ==
Amateur

- Palmer Cup: 2004, 2005 (winners)
- Walker Cup: 2005 (winners)

== See also ==
- 2009 Nationwide Tour graduates
- 2011 Nationwide Tour graduates
- List of Florida Gators men's golfers on the PGA Tour
