= Greenbrier Classic =

Golf tournament

Coordinates: 37.787°N 80.314°W

A Military Tribute at The Greenbrier

Tournament information
- Location: White Sulphur Springs, West Virginia
- Established: 2010
- Courses: The Greenbrier (The Old White)
- Par: 70
- Length: 7,286 yards (6,662 m)
- Tour: PGA Tour
- Format: Stroke play
- Prize fund: US$7,500,000
- Final year: 2019

Tournament record score
- Aggregate: 258 Stuart Appleby (2010)
- To par: −22 as above

Final champion
- (Chile) Joaquín Niemann

Location map
- Location in the United States Location in West Virginia

The Greenbrier Classic was a golf tournament on the PGA Tour, held from 2010 to 2019 at The Old White at The Greenbrier in White Sulphur Springs, West Virginia. For its final two editions, the tournament was titled A Military Tribute at the Greenbrier.

== Course ==
Opened 112 years ago in 1914, The Old White course joined the TPC network of courses in March 2011. It was extended to 7,287 yards (6,663 m) in 2013, and reduced by a yard in 2017; the average elevation is approximately 1,850 feet (565 m) above sea level.

Old White TPC Course in 2018

Hole	Name	Yards	Par	Hole	Name	Yards	Par
1	First	449	4	10	Principal's Nose	385	4
2	Hog's Back	488	4	11	Meadow	493	4
3	Biarritz	205	3	12	Long	568	5
4	Racetrack	427	4	13	Alps	492	4
5	Mounds	388	4	14	Narrows	401	4
6	Lookout	471	4	15	Eden	229	3
7	Plateau	440	4	16	Cape	415	4
8	Redan	234	3	17	Oaks	616	5
9	Punchbowl	408	4	18	Home	177	3
Out		3,510	34	In		3,776	36
Source:				Total		7,286	70

== History ==
The Greenbrier Classic made its debut in 2010 and replaced the long-standing Buick Open in Grand Blanc, Michigan, on the tour schedule. In the final round of the inaugural year, Stuart Appleby shot a 59 (the fifth in PGA Tour history) to win by one stroke. It was his first win on tour in four years.

Played in late July for its first two editions, The Greenbrier Classic moved to early July in 2012. Prior to the 2012 event, the original six-year contract with the PGA Tour was extended another six years, through 2021. The 2012 event was the first time Tiger Woods and Phil Mickelson both missed the cut in the same tournament.

Due to the effects of severe flooding in June 2016, that year's tournament was cancelled.

In 2018, the event was renamed A Military Tribute at The Greenbrier, in honor of U.S. military involvement at the Greenbrier site (such as its use as a military hospital during World War II, and Project Greek Island).

As part of major changes to the PGA Tour schedule, the event moved to September in 2019. Since the season began in the fall, the event skipped the 2018–19 season and was the first event of the 2019–20 season. It was announced in April 2020 that, due in part to decreased attendance in its September date making the tournament less appealing to sponsors, the event would not return and the remainder of the contract with the tour had been cancelled by mutual agreement.

== Winners ==
Year	Winner	Score	To par	Margin of victory	Runner(s)-up	Purse ($)	Winner's share ($)	Ref
A Military Tribute at The Greenbrier
2019	(Chile) Joaquín Niemann	259	−21	6 strokes	(United States) Tom Hoge	7,500,000	1,350,000	
2018	(United States) Kevin Na	261	−19	5 strokes	(United States) Kelly Kraft	7,300,000	1,314,000	
Greenbrier Classic
2017	(United States) Xander Schauffele	266	−14	1 stroke	(United States) Robert Streb	7,100,000	1,278,000	
2016	Canceled due to flooding							
2015	(New Zealand) Danny Lee	267	−13	Playoff	(Canada) David Hearn (United States) Kevin Kisner (United States) Robert Streb	6,700,000	1,206,000	
2014	(Argentina) Ángel Cabrera	264	−16	2 strokes	(United States) George McNeill	6,500,000	1,170,000	
2013	(Sweden) Jonas Blixt	267	−13	2 strokes	(Australia) Steven Bowditch (Australia) Matt Jones (United States) Johnson Wagner (United States) Jimmy Walker	6,300,000	1,134,000	
2012	(United States) Ted Potter Jr.	264	−16	Playoff	(United States) Troy Kelly	6,100,000	1,098,000	
2011	(United States) Scott Stallings	270	−10	Playoff	(United States) Bob Estes (United States) Bill Haas	6,000,000	1,080,000	
2010	(Australia) Stuart Appleby	258	−22	1 stroke	(United States) Jeff Overton	6,000,000	1,080,000	
