= Spencer Levin =

American professional golfer (born 1984)

Personal information
- Full name: Spencer Joseph Levin
- Nationality: United States
- Born: June 15, 1984 (age 42) Sacramento, California, U.S.
- Height: 5 ft 10 in (1.78 m)
- Weight: 155 lb (70 kg; 11.1 st)

Career
- Sport: Golf
- College: University of California, Los Angeles; University of New Mexico
- Turned professional: 2005
- Current tour: Korn Ferry Tour
- Former tours: PGA Tour; Canadian Tour
- Professional wins: 4
- Highest ranking: 60 (June 10, 2012)

Number of wins by tour
- Korn Ferry Tour: 1
- Other: 3

Best results in major championships
- Masters Tournament: DNP
- PGA Championship: T26: 2011
- U.S. Open: T13: 2004
- The Open Championship: T44: 2011

Spencer Joseph Levin (born June 15, 1984) is an American professional golfer who currently plays on the Korn Ferry Tour.

== Early years and amateur career ==
Levin was born in Sacramento, California, the son of Carlene (Rossi) and Don Levin. His mother is a cousin of football official Mike Pereira. Levin attended the University of California, Los Angeles before transferring to the University of New Mexico, where he was a two-time All-American. While at New Mexico, Levin played with future PGA Tour professionals Michael Letzig and Wil Collins. In 2004, he finished T-13 at the U.S. Open and was the low amateur; this earned him an invitation for the 2005 tournament, but he missed the cut.

== Professional career ==
Levin turned professional in 2005. He finished 22nd on the 2008 Nationwide Tour money list and earned an exemption for the 2009 PGA Tour season. His best finish that year was a T-7 at the U.S. Bank Championship in Milwaukee. He finished T-23 at Q-School in December to retain his card for 2010.

In 2010, his best finish was a T-3 at the Children's Miracle Network Classic in November.

In February 2011, Levin finished tied for first at the Mayakoba Golf Classic at Riviera Maya-Cancun with fellow American Johnson Wagner; however, he lost on the first playoff hole, when he made a bogey and Wagner made par on the par-four 18th hole.

In April 2023, Levin won the Veritex Bank Championship on the Korn Ferry Tour.

== Amateur wins ==
- 2003 Azalea Invitational
- 2004 California State Amateur, Porter Cup, Scratch Players Championship

== Professional wins (4) ==
=== Korn Ferry Tour wins (1) ===
No.	Date	Tournament	Winning score	To par	Margin of victory	Runner-up
1	Apr 16, 2023	Veritex Bank Championship	66-68-67-63=264	−20	1 stroke	(Australia) Brett Drewitt

Korn Ferry Tour playoff record (0–1)

No.	Year	Tournament	Opponent	Result
1	2013	Albertsons Boise Open	(United States) Kevin Tway	Lost to birdie on first extra hole

=== Canadian Tour wins (3) ===
No.	Date	Tournament	Winning score	To par	Margin of victory	Runner(s)-up
1	May 20, 2007	Iberostar Riviera Maya Open	67-66-69-65=267	−21	1 stroke	(Canada) Derek Gillespie
2	Jun 17, 2007	Times Colonist Open	70-65-71-71=277	−11	3 strokes	(Australia) Jon Abbott, (United States) Mike Walton
3	Apr 13, 2008	Spring International	71-67-66-69=273	−15	Playoff	(Canada) Andrew Parr

== Playoff record ==
PGA Tour playoff record (0–1)

No.	Year	Tournament	Opponent	Result
1	2011	Mayakoba Golf Classic	(United States) Johnson Wagner	Lost to par on first extra hole

== Results in major championships ==
Tournament	2004	2005	2006	2007	2008	2009	2010	2011	2012	2013	2014	2015	2016
Masters Tournament													
U.S. Open	T13LA	CUT							CUT				T65
The Open Championship				CUT				T44					
PGA Championship								T26	CUT				

Did not play

LA = low amateur
CUT = missed the half-way cut
"T" = tie

== U.S. national team appearances ==
Amateur

- Eisenhower Trophy: 2004 (winners)
- Palmer Cup: 2005 (winners)

== See also ==
- 2008 Nationwide Tour graduates
- 2009 PGA Tour Qualifying School graduates
