= Scott Stallings =

American professional golfer (born 1985)

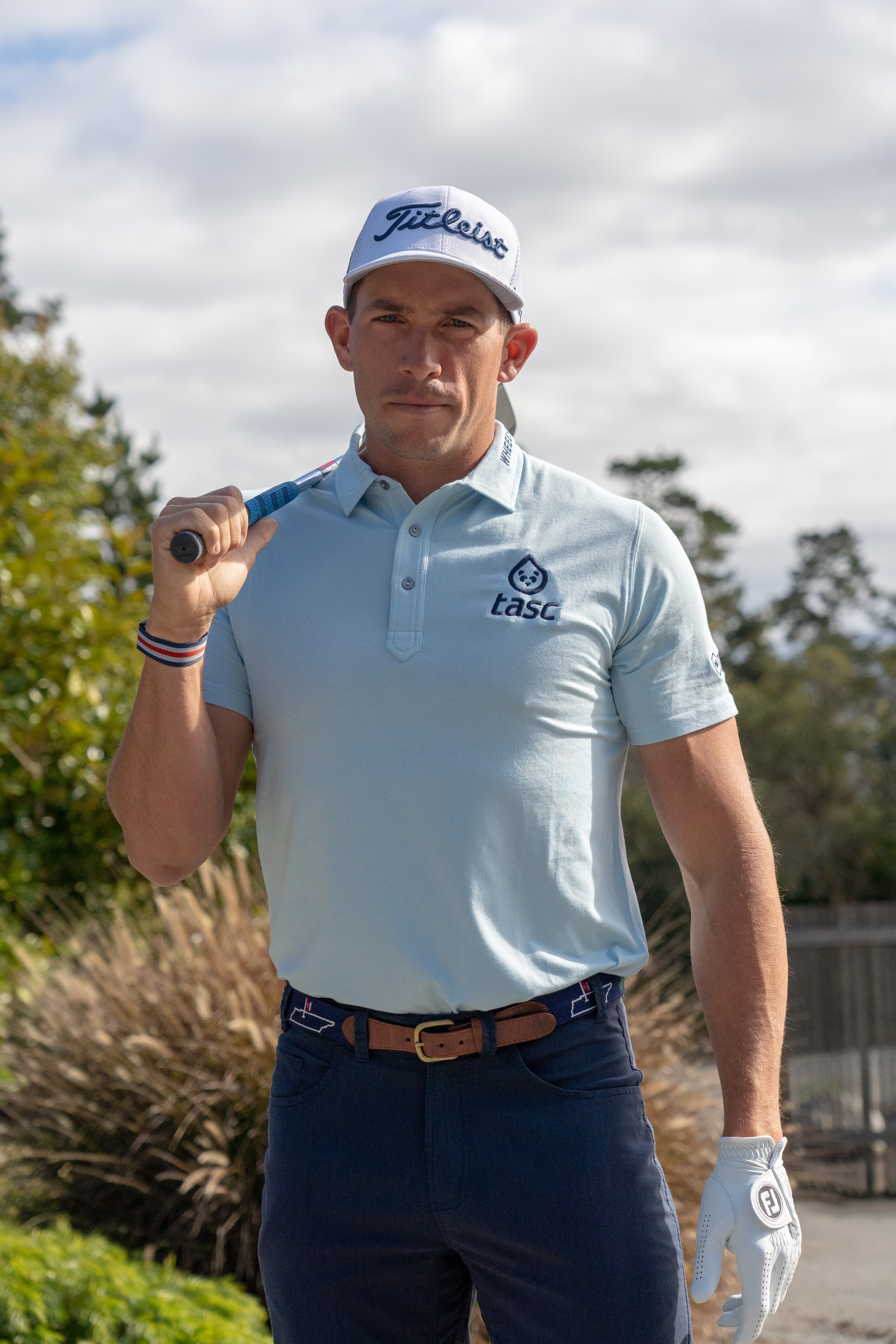

Personal information
- Full name: Scott Robert Stallings
- Nationality: United States
- Born: March 25, 1985 (age 41) Worcester, Massachusetts
- Height: 6 ft 0 in (1.83 m)
- Weight: 195 lb (88 kg; 13.9 st)
- Spouse: Jennifer White
- Children: 2

Career
- Sport: Golf
- College: Tennessee Tech
- Turned professional: 2007
- Current tour: PGA Tour
- Former tour: Nationwide Tour
- Professional wins: 3
- Highest ranking: 53 (January 26, 2014)

Number of wins by tour
- PGA Tour: 3

Best results in major championships
- Masters Tournament: T26: 2023
- PGA Championship: T55: 2013
- U.S. Open: T53: 2013
- The Open Championship: T60: 2023

Scott Robert Stallings (born March 25, 1985) is an American professional golfer who plays on the PGA Tour.

== Early life and amateur career ==
Stallings was born in Worcester, Massachusetts. He attended Oak Ridge High School in Oak Ridge, Tennessee, and was an all-state golfer and a four-year member of the Dean's List. He attended Tennessee Tech, where he was a two-time Ohio Valley Conference Player of the Year, winning seven tournaments and named an All-American in 2006.

== Professional career ==
In 2008 and 2009, Stallings played on the Tarheel Tour and the NGA Hooters Tour. In 2009, he made his first trip to the PGA Tour's Qualifying School, where he missed a PGA Tour card by a single stroke. His finish gave him status on the Nationwide Tour. He made 19 cuts in 28 events and finished 53rd on the Nationwide Tour. He returned to Q School in 2010 and finished T11 to earn his card for 2011. He struggled at the beginning and he missed his first five cuts, then finished T42 at the Puerto Rico Open for his first PGA Tour finish. His next event, the Transitions Championship, earned him a third-place finish. Thanks to a favor from practice partner Kenny Perry, who is sponsored by tournament sponsor Transitions Optical and shares an agent with Stallings, Stallings got into the tournament on a sponsor exemption. The third-place finish was the highest for a sponsor exemption at this event.

Stallings won the Greenbrier Classic in July 2011 for his first PGA Tour victory. Despite struggling at times during the final round, Stallings was able to earn his way into a three-way playoff. He made a birdie on the first playoff hole, while his opponents, Bob Estes and Bill Haas made par, which gave him the title. The win moved Stallings from 88th in the FedEx Cup standings to 26th. His OWGR ranking went from 224th to 119th, after starting the year at 562nd. The win also qualified Stallings for the 2011 WGC-Bridgestone Invitational, 2011 PGA Championship, 2012 Masters Tournament, and the 2012 Players Championship. Stallings won his second career tournament at the 2012 True South Classic. Stallings was unable to defend his title in Mississippi because he earned a spot in the 2013 Open Championship after an already exempt Phil Mickelson won the Scottish Open. It was the second consecutive major Stallings earned entry as an alternate; he gained entry into the U.S. Open after another player withdrew.

In January 2014, Stallings won the Farmers Insurance Open by a single stroke from five other players. The following year, in defense of his title, Stallings lost in a four-man sudden-death playoff, after coming from three strokes behind in the final round. He was eliminated on the first extra hole, when he could only make a par.

On July 7, 2015, Stallings was given a three-month suspension for violating the Tour's drug policy. He took a supplement that was on the banned substances list and self-reported his violation to the PGA Tour.

In August 2022, he finished runner-up at the BMW Championship, which won him a place in the Tour Championship, and an exemption for the 2023 Masters Tournament in April 2023.

== Personal life ==
Stallings is a Christian. Stallings has spoken about his faith saying, "...I know that my score on the course doesn’t define who I am. I’m thankful for where God has placed me at this time in my life. Every day I wake up and thank Him for the opportunity He’s given me to let His light shine through me, and I pray that will always be the case."

== Professional wins (3) ==
=== PGA Tour wins (3) ===
No.	Date	Tournament	Winning score	Margin of victory	Runner(s)-up
1	Jul 31, 2011	Greenbrier Classic	−10 (70-65-66-69=270)	Playoff	(United States) Bob Estes, (United States) Bill Haas
2	Jul 22, 2012	True South Classic	−24 (68-64-64-68=264)	2 strokes	(United States) Jason Bohn
3	Jan 26, 2014	Farmers Insurance Open	−9 (72-67-72-68=279)	1 stroke	(South Korea) K. J. Choi, (Australia) Jason Day, (Canada) Graham DeLaet, (Australia) Marc Leishman, (United States) Pat Perez

PGA Tour playoff record (1–2)

No.	Year	Tournament	Opponents	Result
1	2011	Greenbrier Classic	(United States) Bob Estes, (United States) Bill Haas	Won with birdie on first extra hole
2	2015	Farmers Insurance Open	(Australia) Jason Day, (United States) Harris English, (United States) J. B. Holmes	Day won with par on second extra hole English and Stallings eliminated by birdie on first hole
3	2023	Sanderson Farms Championship	(Sweden) Ludvig Åberg, (United States) Ben Griffin, (United States) Luke List, (Sweden) Henrik Norlander	List won with birdie on first extra hole

== Results in major championships ==
Results not in chronological order in 2020.

Tournament	2011	2012	2013	2014	2015	2016	2017	2018
Masters Tournament		T27		CUT				
U.S. Open			T53					CUT
The Open Championship			CUT	CUT				
PGA Championship	CUT	CUT	T55	CUT				

Tournament	2019	2020	2021	2022	2023
Masters Tournament					T26
PGA Championship				CUT	CUT
U.S. Open				CUT	CUT
The Open Championship		NT			T60

Did not play

CUT = missed the half-way cut
"T" = tied
NT = No tournament due to COVID-19 pandemic

=== Summary ===
Tournament	Wins	2nd	3rd	Top-5	Top-10	Top-25	Events	Cuts made
Masters Tournament	0	0	0	0	0	0	3	2
PGA Championship	0	0	0	0	0	0	6	1
U.S. Open	0	0	0	0	0	0	4	1
The Open Championship	0	0	0	0	0	0	3	1
Totals	0	0	0	0	0	0	14	5

- Most consecutive cuts made – 1 (five times, current)
- Longest streak of top-10s – none

== Results in The Players Championship ==
Tournament	2012	2013	2014	2015	2016	2017	2018	2019	2020	2021	2022	2023	2024
The Players Championship	CUT	CUT	T65	75			CUT	CUT	C	CUT	T42	T69	CUT

Did not play

CUT = missed the halfway cut
"T" indicates a tie for a place
C = Canceled after the first round due to the COVID-19 pandemic

== Results in World Golf Championships ==
Results not in chronological order before 2015.

Tournament	2011	2012	2013	2014	2015	2016	2017	2018	2019	2020	2021	2022	2023
Championship													
Match Play				R64						NT^{1}			T31
Invitational	T29			T52									
Champions	T42			T53						NT^{1}	NT^{1}	NT^{1}	

^{1}Cancelled due to COVID-19 pandemic

Did not play

QF, R16, R32, R64 = Round in which player lost in match play
"T" = Tied
NT = No tournament
Note that the Championship and Invitational were discontinued from 2022. The Champions was discontinued from 2023.

== See also ==
- 2010 PGA Tour Qualifying School graduates
- 2016 Web.com Tour Finals graduates
