= 2012 PGA Tour =

Golf tour season

2012 PGA Tour season
- Duration: January 5, 2012 – November 11, 2012
- Number of official events: 45
- Most wins: (Northern Ireland) Rory McIlroy (4)
- FedEx Cup: (United States) Brandt Snedeker
- Money list: (Northern Ireland) Rory McIlroy
- PGA Tour Player of the Year: (Northern Ireland) Rory McIlroy
- PGA Player of the Year: (Northern Ireland) Rory McIlroy
- Rookie of the Year: (United States) John Huh

The 2012 PGA Tour was the 97th season of the PGA Tour, the main professional golf tour in the United States. It was also the 44th season since separating from the PGA of America, and the sixth edition of the FedEx Cup.

== Changes for 2012 ==
The schedule was announced on October 19, 2011 and had four phases:

- Regular season: Consisted of 37 events and started on January 5 with the limited-field Hyundai Tournament of Champions and ended with the Wyndham Championship on August 19.
- FedEx Cup Playoffs: As in previous seasons, this was a series of four tournaments. It started with The Barclays on August 23 and ended with the Tour Championship on September 23.
- Fall Series: After the Tour Championship, the principal portion of the season ended with a series of four tournaments. These tournaments, generally passed on by the elite players, offered an additional opportunity for players to secure their tour cards for the following season by finishing in the top 125 on the money list, or to gain a two-year exemption by winning a tournament with a slightly weaker field than usual.
- Between the regular season and the end of the Fall Series, the tour had three events, none of which offered official prize money.
  - The 2012 Ryder Cup, a biennial team competition involving the United States team and the European team. In 2012, this event was held in Illinois.
  - The CIMB Classic, a limited-field event held in Malaysia that debuted in 2010.
  - The WGC-HSBC Champions, a World Golf Championships event held in China. Founded in 2005, it was elevated to WGC status in 2009, when it also became an event on the PGA Tour schedule. Although the prize money was unofficial, it counted as an official PGA Tour win, if it was won by a PGA Tour member.

The regular season included all four major championships and three of the World Golf Championships events. All four majors and all four WGC events were also sanctioned by the European Tour.

== Schedule ==
The following table lists official events during the 2012 season.

Date	Tournament	Location	Purse (US$)	Winner (Note: The number in parentheses after each winner's name is the number of PGA Tour events they had won up to and including that tournament. This information is only shown for PGA Tour members.)	OWGR points	Other tours (Note: ASA − Asian Tour.)	Notes
Jan 9	Hyundai Tournament of Champions	Hawaii	5,600,000	(United States) Steve Stricker (12)	38		Winners-only event
Jan 15	Sony Open in Hawaii	Hawaii	5,500,000	(United States) Johnson Wagner (3)	42		
Jan 22	Humana Challenge	California	5,600,000	(United States) Mark Wilson (5)	44		Pro-Am
Jan 29	Farmers Insurance Open	California	6,000,000	(United States) Brandt Snedeker (3)	48		
Feb 5	Waste Management Phoenix Open	Arizona	6,100,000	(United States) Kyle Stanley (1)	50		
Feb 12	AT&T Pebble Beach National Pro-Am	California	6,400,000	(United States) Phil Mickelson (40)	38		Pro-Am
Feb 19	Northern Trust Open	California	6,600,000	(United States) Bill Haas (4)	62		
Feb 26	WGC-Accenture Match Play Championship	Arizona	8,500,000	(United States) Hunter Mahan (4)	76		World Golf Championship
Feb 26	Mayakoba Golf Classic	Mexico	3,700,000	(United States) John Huh (1)	24		Alternate event
Mar 4	The Honda Classic	Florida	5,700,000	(Northern Ireland) Rory McIlroy (3)	50		
Mar 11	WGC-Cadillac Championship	Florida	8,500,000	(England) Justin Rose (4)	78		World Golf Championship
Mar 11	Puerto Rico Open	Puerto Rico	3,500,000	(United States) George McNeill (2)	24		Alternate event
Mar 18	Transitions Championship	Florida	5,500,000	(England) Luke Donald (5)	58		
Mar 25	Arnold Palmer Invitational	Florida	6,000,000	(United States) Tiger Woods (72)	56		Invitational
Apr 1	Shell Houston Open	Texas	6,000,000	(United States) Hunter Mahan (5)	50		
Apr 8	Masters Tournament	Georgia	8,000,000	(United States) Bubba Watson (4)	100		Major championship
Apr 15	RBC Heritage	South Carolina	5,700,000	(Sweden) Carl Pettersson (5)	50		Invitational
Apr 22	Valero Texas Open	Texas	6,200,000	(United States) Ben Curtis (4)	24		
Apr 29	Zurich Classic of New Orleans	Louisiana	6,400,000	(United States) Jason Dufner (1)	52		
May 6	Wells Fargo Championship	North Carolina	6,500,000	(United States) Rickie Fowler (1)	58		
May 13	The Players Championship	Florida	9,500,000	(United States) Matt Kuchar (4)	80		Flagship event
May 20	HP Byron Nelson Championship	Texas	6,500,000	(United States) Jason Dufner (2)	38		
May 27	Crowne Plaza Invitational at Colonial	Texas	6,400,000	(United States) Zach Johnson (8)	50		Invitational
Jun 3	Memorial Tournament	Ohio	6,200,000	(United States) Tiger Woods (73)	68		Invitational
Jun 10	FedEx St. Jude Classic	Tennessee	5,600,000	(United States) Dustin Johnson (6)	34		
Jun 17	U.S. Open	California	8,000,000	(United States) Webb Simpson (3)	100		Major championship
Jun 24	Travelers Championship	Connecticut	6,000,000	(Australia) Marc Leishman (1)	46		
Jul 1	AT&T National	Maryland	6,500,000	(United States) Tiger Woods (74)	48		Invitational
Jul 8	Greenbrier Classic	West Virginia	6,100,000	(United States) Ted Potter Jr. (1)	48		
Jul 15	John Deere Classic	Illinois	4,600,000	(United States) Zach Johnson (9)	36		
Jul 22	The Open Championship	England	£5,000,000	(South Africa) Ernie Els (19)	100		Major championship
Jul 22	True South Classic	Mississippi	3,000,000	(United States) Scott Stallings (2)	24		Alternate event
Jul 29	RBC Canadian Open	Canada	5,200,000	(United States) Scott Piercy (2)	36		
Aug 5	WGC-Bridgestone Invitational	Ohio	8,500,000	(United States) Keegan Bradley (3)	76		World Golf Championship
Aug 5	Reno–Tahoe Open	Nevada	3,000,000	(United States) J. J. Henry (2)	24		Alternate event
Aug 12	PGA Championship	South Carolina	8,000,000	(Northern Ireland) Rory McIlroy (4)	100		Major championship
Aug 20	Wyndham Championship	North Carolina	5,200,000	(Spain) Sergio García (8)	42		
Aug 26	The Barclays	New York	8,000,000	(United States) Nick Watney (5)	74		FedEx Cup playoff event
Sep 3	Deutsche Bank Championship	Massachusetts	8,000,000	(Northern Ireland) Rory McIlroy (5)	74		FedEx Cup playoff event
Sep 9	BMW Championship	Indiana	8,000,000	(Northern Ireland) Rory McIlroy (6)	70		FedEx Cup playoff event
Sep 23	Tour Championship	Georgia	8,000,000	(United States) Brandt Snedeker (4)	62		FedEx Cup playoff event
Oct 7	Justin Timberlake Shriners Hospitals for Children Open	Nevada	4,500,000	(United States) Ryan Moore (2)	30		Fall Series
Oct 14	Frys.com Open	California	5,000,000	(Sweden) Jonas Blixt (1)	24		Fall Series
Oct 21	McGladrey Classic	Georgia	4,000,000	(United States) Tommy Gainey (1)	26		Fall Series
Nov 11	Children's Miracle Network Hospitals Classic	Florida	4,700,000	(United States) Charlie Beljan (1)	24		Fall Series

=== Unofficial events ===
The following events were sanctioned by the PGA Tour, but did not carry FedEx Cup points or official money, nor were wins official.

Date	Tournament	Location	Purse ($)	Winner(s)	OWGR points	Other tours	Notes
Mar 20	Tavistock Cup	Florida	2,170,000	Team Lake Nona	n/a		Team event
Jun 19	CVS Caremark Charity Classic	Rhode Island	1,300,000	(United States) Jay Haas and (United States) Morgan Pressel	n/a		Team event
Sep 30	Ryder Cup	Illinois	n/a	Team Europe	n/a		Team event
Oct 24	PGA Grand Slam of Golf	Bermuda	1,350,000	(Republic of Ireland) Pádraig Harrington	n/a		Limited-field event
Oct 28	CIMB Classic	Malaysia	6,100,000	(United States) Nick Watney	36	ASA	Limited-field event
Nov 4	WGC-HSBC Champions	China	7,000,000	(England) Ian Poulter (2)	64		World Golf Championship (Note: Unofficial money event at the time, however counted as an official win as Poulter was a PGA Tour member.)
Nov 13	Wendy's 3-Tour Challenge	Nevada	1,000,000	PGA Tour	n/a		Team event
Dec 2	World Challenge	California	4,000,000	(Northern Ireland) Graeme McDowell	44		Limited-field event
Dec 9	Franklin Templeton Shootout	Florida	3,000,000	(United States) Sean O'Hair and (United States) Kenny Perry	n/a		Team event

== Location of tournaments ==
Location of official tournaments of the 2012 PGA Tour in the continental United States and Canada.
600-point event (Players & Majors)
550-point event (World Golf Championships)
500-point event (Regular events)
250-point event (Alternate events)
FedEx Cup playoff event
Fall Series event
Location of official tournaments of the 2012 PGA Tour outside the continental United States and Canada.
600-point event (Players & Majors)
500-point event (Regular events)
250-point event (Alternate events)

== FedEx Cup ==
=== Final standings ===
For full rankings, see 2012 FedEx Cup Playoffs.

Final top 10 players in the FedEx Cup:

Position	Player	Points	Bonus money ($)
1	(United States) Brandt Snedeker	4,100	10,000,000
2	(Northern Ireland) Rory McIlroy	2,827	3,000,000
3	(United States) Tiger Woods	2,663	2,000,000
4	(United States) Nick Watney	2,215	1,500,000
5	(United States) Phil Mickelson	2,073	1,000,000
6	(England) Justin Rose	1,770	800,000
7	(South Africa) Louis Oosthuizen	1,635	700,000
8	(United States) Dustin Johnson	1,527	600,000
9	(England) Luke Donald	1,275	550,000
10	(England) Lee Westwood	1,205	500,000

== Money list ==
The money list was based on prize money won during the season, calculated in U.S. dollars.

Position	Player	Prize money ($)
1	(Northern Ireland) Rory McIlroy	8,047,952
2	(United States) Tiger Woods	6,133,158
3	(United States) Brandt Snedeker	4,989,739
4	(United States) Jason Dufner	4,869,304
5	(United States) Bubba Watson	4,644,997
6	(United States) Zach Johnson	4,504,244
7	(England) Justin Rose	4,290,930
8	(United States) Phil Mickelson	4,203,821
9	(United States) Hunter Mahan	4,019,193
10	(United States) Keegan Bradley	3,910,658

== Awards ==
Award	Winner	Ref.
PGA Tour Player of the Year (Jack Nicklaus Trophy)	(Northern Ireland) Rory McIlroy	
PGA Player of the Year	(Northern Ireland) Rory McIlroy	
Rookie of the Year	(United States) John Huh	
Scoring leader (PGA Tour – Byron Nelson Award)	(Northern Ireland) Rory McIlroy	
Scoring leader (PGA – Vardon Trophy)	(Northern Ireland) Rory McIlroy	

== See also ==
- 2012 in golf
- 2012 Champions Tour
- 2012 Web.com Tour
