= Johnson Wagner =

American professional golfer (born 1980)

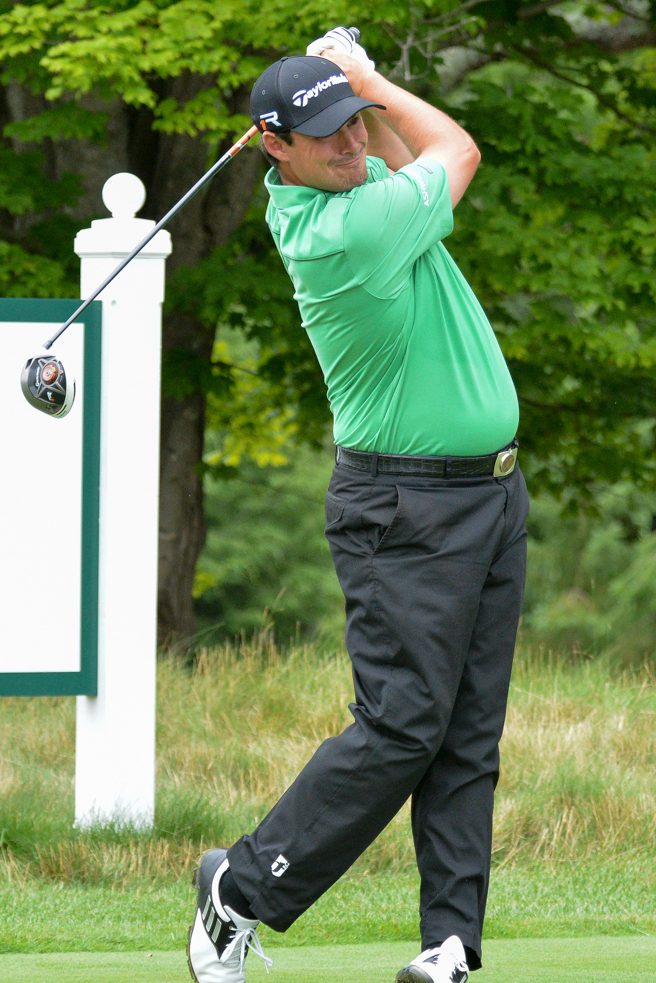
- Wagner in 2013

Personal information
- Full name: Montford Johnson Wagner
- Nationality: United States
- Born: March 23, 1980 (age 46) Amarillo, Texas, U.S.
- Height: 6 ft 3 in (1.91 m)
- Weight: 230 lb (100 kg; 16 st)
- Spouse: Katie (Winn) Wagner
- Children: Graham, Marianne

Career
- Sport: Golf
- College: Virginia Tech
- Turned professional: 2002
- Current tours: PGA Tour (past champion status)
- Professional wins: 7
- Highest ranking: 60 (April 8, 2012)

Number of wins by tour
- PGA Tour: 3
- Korn Ferry Tour: 2
- Other: 2

Best results in major championships
- Masters Tournament: T36: 2008
- PGA Championship: T51: 2011
- U.S. Open: CUT: 2004, 2007
- The Open Championship: T58: 2013

Montford Johnson Wagner (born March 23, 1980) is an American professional golfer and golf analyst who played on the PGA Tour and Korn Ferry Tour between 2003 and 2022.

== Early years and amateur career ==
Wagner was born in Amarillo, Texas and grew up in upstate New York, where his father taught computer sciences at the United States Military Academy at West Point. He caddied for three summers at Hudson National in Westchester County, New York.

Wagner attended Virginia Tech, where he was a golf team member. He was a two-time All-Big East Conference selection and individual medalist at the 2002 Big East Conference Championship. He met his wife, Katie, at Virginia Tech; she was a player on the women's soccer team. Wagner earned a spot in the Virginia Tech Sports Hall of Fame.

== Professional career ==
Wagner turned professional in 2002 and is currently a PGA Tour member. He was a member of the Nationwide Tour from 2003 to 2006. He earned his PGA Tour card for the 2007 season by finishing 2nd on the money list in the Nationwide Tour in 2006. In 2008 Wagner gained his first PGA Tour victory at the Shell Houston Open. The win earned him an invitation to the Masters Tournament and a two-year Tour exemption.

In 2010, Wagner finished 126th on the PGA Tour after a rally at the season finale fell short, just missing full Tour privileges. He was described as "delighted" because he started the week 153rd on the money list. Wagner's improved position meant avoiding the second stage of PGA Tour Q School and retaining conditional status on the PGA Tour rather than having to play out of the past champions category, earning him a few more starts.

On February 27, 2011, he won the Mayakoba Golf Classic at Riviera Maya-Cancun in a playoff over Spencer Levin with a par on the first hole and regained his Tour card through 2013. It was the first time since 2000 that a golfer (Robert Allenby) finished 126th on the Tour and won the following season. Johnson won the first full-field event of 2012, the Sony Open in Hawaii, and extended his Tour privileges through 2014. He also moved into the Top 100 in the OWGR for the first time in his career, moving from 198 to 92. Wagner had a disappointing 2014 season on the PGA Tour and finished 150th on the FedEx Cup points list (the last position to retain any PGA Tour status), leaving him conditionally exempt for the 2014–15 season.

Having lost his full playing privileges, Wagner earned entry as a sponsor exemption for the 2015 Shell Houston Open. Wagner lost in a sudden-death playoff to J. B. Holmes on the second extra hole. This moved Wagner from 180th in the FedEx Cup standings to 81st. He would regain his PGA Tour card after finishing 87th in the FedEx Cup.

The last PGA Tour tournament Wagner competed in was the 2022 Butterfield Bermuda Championship where he missed the cut.

== Broadcasting ==
As of 2023, Wagner is working as a golf analyst for NBC Sports and Golf Channel. Starting in 2026, Wagner will work as a golf analyst for CBS Sports.

== Amateur wins ==
this list may be incomplete

- 2001 Metropolitan Amateur
- 2002 Metropolitan Amateur

== Professional wins (7) ==
=== PGA Tour wins (3) ===
| No. | Date | Tournament | Winning score | Margin of victory | Runner(s)-up |
|---|---|---|---|---|---|
| 1 | Apr 6, 2008 | Shell Houston Open | −16 (63-69-69-71=272) | 2 strokes | (United States) Chad Campbell, (Australia) Geoff Ogilvy |
| 2 | Feb 27, 2011 | Mayakoba Golf Classic | −17 (69-66-65-67=267) | Playoff | (United States) Spencer Levin |
| 3 | Jan 15, 2012 | Sony Open in Hawaii | −13 (68-66-66-67=267) | 2 strokes | (United States) Harrison Frazar, (United States) Charles Howell III, (United States) Sean O'Hair, (Sweden) Carl Pettersson |

PGA Tour playoff record (1–1)

| No. | Year | Tournament | Opponent(s) | Result |
|---|---|---|---|---|
| 1 | 2011 | Mayakoba Golf Classic | (United States) Spencer Levin | Won with par on first extra hole |
| 2 | 2015 | Shell Houston Open | (United States) J. B. Holmes, (United States) Jordan Spieth | Holmes won with par on second extra hole Spieth eliminated by par on first hole |

=== Nationwide Tour wins (2) ===
| No. | Date | Tournament | Winning score | Margin of victory | Runner-up |
|---|---|---|---|---|---|
| 1 | Mar 6, 2006 | Chitimacha Louisiana Open | −12 (67-69-69-67=272) | 1 stroke | (United States) Chad Collins |
| 2 | Aug 6, 2006 | Cox Classic | −21 (66-70-64-63=263) | 4 strokes | (United States) Craig Bowden |

=== Other wins (2) ===
- 2001 Metropolitan Open (as an amateur)
- 2002 Metropolitan Open

== Results in major championships ==
| Tournament | 2004 | 2005 | 2006 | 2007 | 2008 | 2009 | 2010 | 2011 | 2012 | 2013 |
|---|---|---|---|---|---|---|---|---|---|---|
| Masters Tournament | | | | | T36 | | | | CUT | |
| U.S. Open | CUT | | | CUT | | | | | | |
| The Open Championship | | | | | | | | | CUT | T58 |
| PGA Championship | | | | | CUT | | | T51 | CUT | |

Did not play

CUT = missed the half-way cut
"T" = tied

== Results in The Players Championship ==
| Tournament | 2008 | 2009 | 2010 | 2011 | 2012 | 2013 | 2014 | 2015 | 2016 | 2017 |
|---|---|---|---|---|---|---|---|---|---|---|
| The Players Championship | T54 | T60 | | CUT | T35 | CUT | CUT | | T64 | CUT |

Did not play

CUT = missed the halfway cut
"T" indicates a tie for a place

== Results in World Golf Championships ==
| Tournament | 2008 | 2009 | 2010 | 2011 | 2012 |
|---|---|---|---|---|---|
| Match Play | | | | | |
| Championship | | | | | T13 |
| Invitational | T71 | | | | T36 |
| Champions | | | | | 75 |

Did not play

"T" = Tied
Note that the HSBC Champions did not become a WGC event until 2009.

== See also ==
- 2006 Nationwide Tour graduates
