= 2013 U.S. Open (golf) =

Coordinates: 40.001°N 75.312°W

Tournament information
- Dates: June 13–16, 2013
- Location: Haverford Township, Pennsylvania
- Courses: Merion Golf Club; East Course
- Organized by: USGA
- Tours: PGA Tour; European Tour; Japan Golf Tour

Statistics
- Par: 70
- Length: 6,996 yards (6,397 m)
- Field: 156 players, 73 after cut
- Cut: 148 (+8)
- Prize fund: $8,000,000 €6,118,872
- Winner's share: $1,440,000 €1,101,397

Champion
- (England) Justin Rose
- 281 (+1)

Location in the United States
Location in Pennsylvania

The 2013 United States Open Championship was the 113th U.S. Open, held June 13–16 at the East Course of Merion Golf Club in Ardmore, Pennsylvania, west of Philadelphia. Justin Rose won his first major title, two strokes ahead of runners-up Jason Day and Phil Mickelson.

Rose became the first player from England to win the U.S. Open since Tony Jacklin in 1970, and the first to win any major since Nick Faldo won his third Masters in 1996. It was a record sixth runner-up finish for Mickelson and defending champion Webb Simpson tied for 32nd place. Inclement weather in the opening round delayed the completion of each of the first two rounds to the following day, and the average score in each of the four rounds exceeded 74 (+4). Shawn Stefani recorded the first hole in one during a U.S. Open at Merion, acing the 229-yard (209 m) 17th on Sunday.

== Venue ==
The 2013 U.S. Open was the fifth Open played at Merion's East Course, which opened in 1912. The past Open champions on the course were Olin Dutra in 1934, Ben Hogan in 1950, Lee Trevino in 1971, and David Graham in 1981. The course has also hosted the U.S. Amateur six times.

== Field ==
About half the field consisted of players who are exempt from qualifying for the U.S. Open. Each player is classified according to the first category in which he qualified, and other categories are shown in parentheses.

1. Winners of the U.S. Open Championship the last ten years

- Ángel Cabrera (5,13,14)
- Michael Campbell
- Jim Furyk (11,12,13,14)
- Lucas Glover
- Graeme McDowell (11,13,14)
- Rory McIlroy (7,12,13,14)
- Geoff Ogilvy
- Webb Simpson (11,12,13,14)
- Tiger Woods (8,12,13,14)
- Retief Goosen (11) did not play due to a back injury.

2. Winner and runner-up of the 2012 U.S. Amateur Championship

- Steven Fox (a)
- Michael Weaver (a)

3. Winner of the 2012 Amateur Championship

- Alan Dunbar turned professional in April 2013, forfeiting his exemption.

4. Winner of the 2012 Mark H. McCormack Medal (Men's World Amateur Golf Rankings)

- Chris Williams (a)

5. Winners of the Masters Tournament during the last five years

- Phil Mickelson (12,13,14)
- Charl Schwartzel (13,14)
- Adam Scott (12,13,14)
- Bubba Watson (12,13,14)

6. Winners of The Open Championship during the last five years

- Stewart Cink
- Darren Clarke
- Ernie Els (11,12,13,14)
- Pádraig Harrington (7,11)
- Louis Oosthuizen (12,13,14)

7. Winners of the PGA Championship the last five years

- Keegan Bradley (12,13,14)
- Martin Kaymer (13,14)
- Yang Yong-eun

8. Winners of The Players Championship during the last three years

- K. J. Choi
- Matt Kuchar (12,13,14)

9. Winner of the 2013 European Tour BMW PGA Championship

- Matteo Manassero (13,14)

10. Winner of the 2012 U.S. Senior Open Championship

- Roger Chapman withdrew due to a shoulder injury.

11. The 10 lowest scorers and anyone tying for 10th place at the 2012 U.S. Open Championship

- Kevin Chappell
- Jason Dufner (12,13,14)
- John Peterson
- John Senden (12)
- Michael Thompson (13,14)
- David Toms
- Lee Westwood (12,13,14)
- Casey Wittenberg

12. Players who qualified for the season-ending 2012 Tour Championship

- Luke Donald (13,14)
- Rickie Fowler (13,14)
- Sergio García (13,14)
- Robert Garrigus (13,14)
- John Huh
- Dustin Johnson (13,14)
- Zach Johnson (13,14)
- Hunter Mahan (13,14)
- Ryan Moore (13,14)
- Carl Pettersson (13,14)
- Scott Piercy (13,14)
- Justin Rose (13,14)
- Brandt Snedeker (13,14)
- Steve Stricker (13,14)
- Bo Van Pelt (13,14)
- Nick Watney (13,14)

13. The top 60 point leaders and ties as of May 27, 2013 in the World Rankings

- Tim Clark (14)
- George Coetzee (14)
- Nicolas Colsaerts (14)
- Jason Day (14)
- Jamie Donaldson (14)
- Gonzalo Fernández-Castaño (14)
- Branden Grace (14)
- Bill Haas (14)
- Peter Hanson (14)
- Russell Henley (14)
- Billy Horschel (14)
- Freddie Jacobson (14)
- Martin Laird (14)
- Paul Lawrie (14)
- Marc Leishman
- Francesco Molinari (14)
- Thorbjørn Olesen (14)
- D. A. Points (14)
- Ian Poulter (14)
- Marcel Siem (14)
- Henrik Stenson (14)
- Kevin Streelman (14)
- Thongchai Jaidee (14)
- Boo Weekley (14)
- David Lynn (14) and Richard Sterne (14) opted not to compete.

14. The top 60 point leaders and ties as of June 10, 2013 in the World Rankings

- Kyle Stanley

15. Special exemptions selected by the USGA

- None

The remaining contestants earned their places through sectional qualifiers.

- Japan: Hiroyuki Fujita, Hwang Jung-gon, Hideki Matsuyama, Yoshinobu Tsukada, Yui Ueda
- England: Paul Casey, Chris Doak, Marcus Fraser, Estanislao Goya, Peter Hedblom, David Howell, Simon Khan, Morten Ørum Madsen, José María Olazábal, John Parry, Eddie Pepperell, Jaco van Zyl
- United States

- Newport Beach, California: Steven Alker, Max Homa (a), Kim Bi-o, Cory McElyea (a,L), Roger Tambellini (L)
- Bradenton, Florida: John Hahn (L), John Nieporte (L), Kevin Phelan (a)
- Ball Ground, Georgia: Michael Kim (a), Grayson Murray (a,L), Ryan Nelson (L)
- Rockville, Maryland: Matt Bettencourt, Mathew Goggin, Adam Hadwin, Matt Harmon (L), Randall Hutchison (L), Russell Knox, Cliff Kresge, Ryan Sullivan (L)
- St. Louis, Missouri: Jay Don Blake, Mackenzie Hughes (L)
- Purchase, New York: Gavin Hall (a,L), Jim Herman, Geoffrey Sisk (L), Jesse Smith (L)
- Columbus, Ohio: Aaron Baddeley, Bae Sang-moon, Luke Guthrie, David Hearn, Justin Hicks, Charley Hoffman, Brandt Jobe (L), Robert Karlsson, Doug LaBelle II, David Lingmerth, Ted Potter Jr., Rory Sabbatini, Brendan Steele, Josh Teater, Nicholas Thompson
- Springfield, Ohio: Brandon Brown, Brian Stuard
- Memphis, Tennessee: Brandon Crick (L), Morgan Hoffmann, Jerry Kelly, Scott Langley, Joe Ogilvie, Alistair Presnell, Shawn Stefani, Kevin Sutherland, Andrew Svoboda
- Dallas, Texas: Zack Fischer (L), Edward Loar, Jordan Spieth, Matt Weibring
- Cle Elum, Washington: Wil Collins, Pan Cheng-tsung (a)

Six alternates were also selected from sectional qualifiers.

- Scott Stallings (Memphis) – replaced Roger Chapman
- Mike Weir (Columbus) – claimed spot held for category 14
- Harold Varner III (L, Rockville) – claimed spot held for category 14
- Ryan Palmer (Dallas) – claimed spot held for category 14
- Ryan Yip (L, Springfield) – claimed spot held for category 14
- Rikard Karlberg (England) – claimed spot held for category 14

(a) denotes amateur
(L) denotes player advanced through local qualifying

For 28 players, the U.S. Open was their first major appearance.

- Brandon Brown, Brandon Crick, Chris Doak, Zack Fischer, Luke Guthrie, John Hahn, Gavin Hall, Matt Harmon, Max Homa, Mackenzie Hughes, Randall Hutchison, Kim Bi-o, Michael Kim, Russell Knox, David Lingmerth, Cory McElyea, Grayson Murray, John Nieporte, John Parry, Eddie Pepperell, Jesse Smith, Brian Stuard, Ryan Sullivan, Jaco van Zyl, Yui Ueda, Harold Varner III, Matt Weibring, and Ryan Yip.

== Course layout ==
East Course

Round	Hole	1	2	3	4	5	6	7	8	9	Out	10	11	12	13	14	15	16	17	18	In	Total
	Par	4	5	3	5	4	4	4	4	3	36	4	4	4	3	4	4	4	3	4	34	70
1	Yards	340	567	246	640	499	489	382	360	237	3,760	301	375	386	102	446	413	440	243	500	3,206	6,966
2	Yards	356	557	203	628	504	491	368	363	219	3,689	313	363	405	123	453	414	434	206	501	3,212	6,901
3	Yards	342	556	245	604	510	477	363	351	231	3,679	280	370	403	98	476	397	446	254	530	3,254	6,933
4	Yards	360	525	266	571	495	490	340	353	246	3,646	290	356	419	121	452	422	423	229	511	3,223	6,869

Lengths of the course for U.S. Opens:

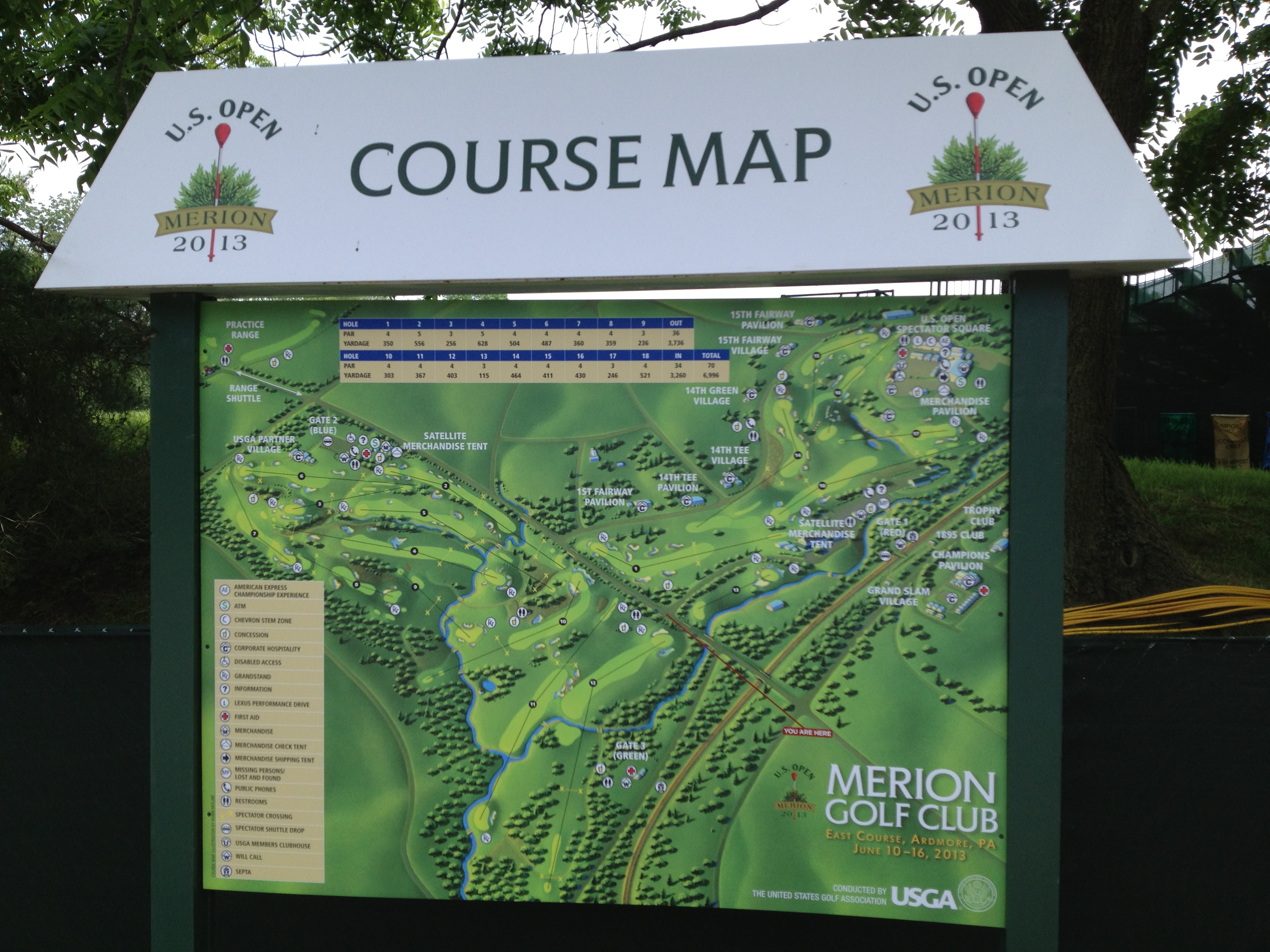
US Open 2013 Course Map

- 2013: 6,996 yards (6,397 m), par 70
- 1981: 6,544 yards (5,984 m), par 70
- 1971: 6,544 yards (5,984 m), par 70
- 1950: 6,694 yards (6,121 m), par 70
- 1934: 6,694 yards (6,121 m), par 70

The course was re-measured prior to the 1971 Open and found to be 150 yds shorter than previously thought. Given that the same tees were used, the previous two opens were also played over 6544 yds as the previous measurement of 6694 was incorrect.

One unique aspect of the course was that players began the first and second rounds on the 1st and 11th tees, rather than the 1st and 10th tees, as is typical. This was due to the 11th tee being more conveniently located relative to the practice range than the 10th tee. This was the second straight year the players did not begin rounds on the 10th tee as the first and second rounds started on the 1st and 9th tee the previous year at Olympic Club.

== Round summaries ==
=== First round ===
Thursday, June 13, 2013
Friday, June 14, 2013

Due to rain delays, the first round was not completed on Thursday; only the morning half of the field completed their rounds. Luke Donald was the overnight leader at −4, while Mickelson was the clubhouse leader at 67 (−3). When the first round was completed Friday morning, only five players were under par: Mickelson at 67 (−3), Donald and Mathew Goggin at 68 (−2) and Nicolas Colsaerts and Russell Knox at 69 (−1). Since 2008, the USGA has placed the top three players in the world rankings in the same grouping for the first two rounds. None of the three broke par in the first round: Tiger Woods and Rory McIlroy shot 73 (+3) and Adam Scott 72 (+2). The scoring average for the field was 74.31, more than four strokes over par.

Place	Player	Score	To par
1	(United States) Phil Mickelson	67	−3
T2	(England) Luke Donald	68	−2
T2	(Australia) Mathew Goggin	68	−2
T4	(Belgium) Nicolas Colsaerts	69	−1
T4	(Scotland) Russell Knox	69	−1
T6	(South Korea) K. J. Choi	70	E
T6	(South Africa) Tim Clark	70	E
T6	(Australia) Jason Day	70	E
T6	(United States) Rickie Fowler	70	E
T6	(South Africa) Branden Grace	70	E
T6	(Sweden) Peter Hedblom	70	E
T6	(United States) Jerry Kelly	70	E
T6	(South Africa) Charl Schwartzel	70	E
T6	(Australia) John Senden	70	E
T6	(England) Lee Westwood	70	E

=== Second round ===
Friday, June 14, 2013
Saturday, June 15, 2013

On Friday, the second round was suspended due to darkness, with 68 players yet to complete their rounds. The leaders in the clubhouse were Mickelson and Billy Horschel, at 139 (−1). Horschel hit all 18 greens in regulation and shot a 67 (−3). When the second round was completed Saturday morning, Horschel and Mickelson still stood atop the leader board. Only six players shot under-par rounds, led by Horschel's 67. The scoring average for the second round was 75.13.

Place	Player	Score	To par
T1	(United States) Billy Horschel	72-67=139	−1
T1	(United States) Phil Mickelson	67-72=139	−1
T3	(England) Luke Donald	68-72=140	E
T3	(England) Justin Rose	71-69=140	E
T3	(United States) Steve Stricker	71-69=140	E
T6	(Belgium) Nicolas Colsaerts	69-72=141	+1
T6	(United States) Hunter Mahan	72-69=141	+1
T6	(South Africa) Charl Schwartzel	70-71=141	+1
T6	(Australia) John Senden	70-71=141	+1
T10	(Australia) Mathew Goggin	68-74=142	+2
T10	(England) Ian Poulter	71-71=142	+2
T10	(Sweden) Henrik Stenson	74-68=142	+2

Amateurs: Kim (+3), Pan (+4), Weaver (+8), Phelan (+8), Williams (+9), Fox (+10), Hall (+11), Homa (+11), McElyea (+20), Murray (+24)

=== Third round ===
Saturday, June 15, 2013

Mickelson shot an even-par round for 209 (−1) to stay atop the leaderboard, his second 54-hole lead at the U.S. Open. Hunter Mahan, Charl Schwartzel, and Steve Stricker were one shot back at even-par 210. As in the second round, only six players had under-par rounds, led by Rickie Fowler at 67. Woods struggled with his putting; after a birdie on the par-4 1st, he made seven bogeys to shoot 76 and fall to 219 (+9), ten strokes back. The scoring average for the third round was 74.36.

Place	Player	Score	To par
1	(United States) Phil Mickelson	67-72-70=209	−1
T2	(United States) Hunter Mahan	72-69-69=210	E
T2	(South Africa) Charl Schwartzel	70-71-69=210	E
T2	(United States) Steve Stricker	71-69-70=210	E
T5	(England) Luke Donald	68-72-71=211	+1
T5	(United States) Billy Horschel	72-67-72=211	+1
T5	(England) Justin Rose	71-69-71=211	+1
8	(Australia) Jason Day	70-74-68=212	+2
9	(United States) Rickie Fowler	70-76-67=213	+3
10	(United States) Michael Kim (a)	73-70-71=214	+4

=== Final round ===
Sunday, June 16, 2013

Phil Mickelson three-putted the third and fifth holes for double bogeys, but took back the lead with an eagle on the 10th. Justin Rose responded with birdies on the 12th and 13th. A bogey by Mickelson on the 13th gave Rose the lead.

Through 16 holes, Rose had five birdies and five bogeys and a one-shot lead over Mickelson. He managed par on the challenging final two holes, finishing with an even-par 70 for a 281 (+1) overall. Mickelson narrowly missed a birdie putt on the 16th that would have tied Rose and did not threaten to birdie either of the final two holes. A missed long par putt on 18 dropped him to +3 overall and into a tie with Jason Day for second place.

For Rose, it was his first major title. He completed the tournament without any double bogeys. On his win, Rose commented "It feels fantastic. I committed myself to the process this week. I committed myself to putting a strategy in place that I hoped would work in five-to-10 years in delivering major championships ... it's a moment where you can look back and think childhood dreams have come true." He was the first English player to win the U.S. Open since Tony Jacklin in 1970, and the first to win any major since Nick Faldo won the 1996 Masters. Rose, who entered the tournament ranked fifth in the world, moved up to third as a result of the win.

For Mickelson, it was his sixth runner-up finish at the U.S. Open, an event record. He has never won the event and called the loss heartbreaking: "this is tough to swallow after coming so close ... I felt like this was as good an opportunity I could ask for and to not get it ... it hurts."

Mahan was tied for the lead as late as the 14th hole before going +4 on the last four holes and dropping into a four-way tie for fourth, four strokes back. Jason Dufner shot a 67 (−3) despite a triple-bogey on 15 to tie Mahan, Horschel, and Ernie Els. Hideki Matsuyama also shot a 67 with six birdies to finish in a tie for tenth. Schwartzel started the day one shot back, but a 78 dropped him outside the top 10.

Shawn Stefani recorded the first hole-in-one during a U.S. Open at Merion, acing the 229-yard (209 m) 17th. His 4-iron tee shot bounced off the slope left of the green and rolled a considerable distance into the cup. The scoring average for the fourth round was 74.05.

==== Final leaderboard ====
Champion
Silver Cup winner (leading amateur)
(a) = amateur
(c) = past champion

Place	Player	Score	To par	Money ($)
1	(England) Justin Rose	71-69-71-70=281	+1	1,440,000
T2	(Australia) Jason Day	70-74-68-71=283	+3	696,104
T2	(United States) Phil Mickelson	67-72-70-74=283	+3	696,104
T4	(United States) Jason Dufner	74-71-73-67=285	+5	291,406
T4	(South Africa) Ernie Els (c)	71-72-73-69=285	+5	291,406
T4	(United States) Billy Horschel	72-67-72-74=285	+5	291,406
T4	(United States) Hunter Mahan	72-69-69-75=285	+5	291,406
T8	(England) Luke Donald	68-72-71-75=286	+6	210,006
T8	(United States) Steve Stricker	71-69-70-76=286	+6	210,006
T10	(Belgium) Nicolas Colsaerts	69-72-74-72=287	+7	168,530
T10	(Spain) Gonzalo Fernández-Castaño	71-72-72-72=287	+7	168,530
T10	(United States) Rickie Fowler	70-76-67-74=287	+7	168,530
T10	(Japan) Hideki Matsuyama	71-75-74-67=287	+7	168,530

Leaderboard below the top 10
Place	Player	Score	To par	Money ($)
14	(South Africa) Charl Schwartzel	70-71-69-78=288	+8	144,444
T15	(Australia) John Senden	70-71-74-74=289	+9	132,453
T15	(England) Lee Westwood	70-77-69-73=289	+9	132,453
T17	(United States) John Huh	71-73-75-71=290	+10	115,591
T17	(United States) Michael Kim (a)	73-70-71-76=290	+10	0
T17	(Sweden) David Lingmerth	74-71-71-74=290	+10	115,591
T17	(United States) Brandt Snedeker	74-74-70-72=290	+10	115,591
T21	(Australia) Mathew Goggin	68-74-76-73=291	+11	86,579
T21	(Republic of Ireland) Pádraig Harrington	73-71-75-72=291	+11	86,579
T21	(Canada) David Hearn	78-69-73-71=291	+11	86,579
T21	(Scotland) Martin Laird	74-73-76-68=291	+11	86,579
T21	(England) Ian Poulter	71-71-73-76=291	+11	86,579
T21	(Sweden) Henrik Stenson	74-68-73-76=291	+11	86,579
T21	(United States) Bo Van Pelt	73-71-72-75=291	+11	86,579
T28	(United States) Matt Kuchar	74-73-72-73=292	+12	60,183
T28	(Denmark) Morten Ørum Madsen	74-74-70-74=292	+12	60,183
T28	(England) John Parry	76-71-72-73=292	+12	60,183
T28	(Canada) Mike Weir	72-76-75-69=292	+12	60,183
T32	(United States) Kevin Chappell	72-76-74-71=293	+13	47,246
T32	(South Korea) K. J. Choi	70-76-75-72=293	+13	47,246
T32	(Wales) Jamie Donaldson	73-73-73-74=293	+13	47,246
T32	(Scotland) Paul Lawrie	76-71-69-77=293	+13	47,246
T32	(United States) Edward Loar	73-71-73-76=293	+13	47,246
T32	(Australia) Geoff Ogilvy (c)	74-70-77-72=293	+13	47,246
T32	(United States) Webb Simpson (c)	71-75-75-72=293	+13	47,246
T32	(United States) Bubba Watson	71-76-70-76=293	+13	47,246
T32	(United States) Tiger Woods (c)	73-70-76-74=293	+13	47,246
T41	(United States) Jerry Kelly	70-73-75-76=294	+14	37,324
T41	(United States) Scott Langley	75-70-75-74=294	+14	37,324
T41	(Northern Ireland) Rory McIlroy (c)	73-70-75-76=294	+14	37,324
T41	(Sweden) Carl Pettersson	72-75-74-73=294	+14	37,324
T45	(New Zealand) Steven Alker	73-75-75-72=295	+15	28,961
T45	(England) Paul Casey	73-72-71-79=295	+15	28,961
T45	(Spain) Sergio García	73-73-75-74=295	+15	28,961
T45	(United States) Charley Hoffman	71-73-72-79=295	+15	28,961
T45	(South Korea) Kim Bi-o	72-75-73-75=295	+15	28,961
T45	(Scotland) Russell Knox	69-75-77-74=295	+15	28,961
T45	(Taiwan) Pan Cheng-tsung (a)	72-72-75-76=295	+15	0
T45	(Australia) Adam Scott	72-75-73-75=295	+15	28,961
T53	(United States) Matt Bettencourt	72-71-76-77=296	+16	23,446
T53	(United States) Scott Stallings	71-76-76-73=296	+16	23,446
55	(United States) Dustin Johnson	71-77-75-74=297	+17	22,561
T56	(South Africa) George Coetzee	71-73-77-77=298	+18	21,485
T56	(United States) Josh Teater	74-74-74-76=298	+18	21,485
T56	(United States) Nicholas Thompson	72-76-74-76=298	+18	21,485
T59	(Germany) Martin Kaymer	76-72-77-74=299	+19	20,111
T59	(Germany) Marcel Siem	73-71-77-78=299	+19	20,111
T59	(United States) Shawn Stefani	72-73-85-69=299	+19	20,111
T62	(Republic of Ireland) Kevin Phelan (a)	71-77-78-74=300	+20	0
T62	(United States) Matt Weibring	75-73-76-76=300	+20	19,406
64	(United States) Michael Weaver (a)	74-74-78-75=301	+21	0
T65	(Sweden) Peter Hedblom	70-78-79-75=302	+22	18,926
T65	(England) David Howell	77-71-77-77=302	+22	18,926
T67	(United States) Jim Herman	76-72-76-79=303	+23	17,965
T67	(United States) John Peterson	73-75-78-77=303	+23	17,965
T67	(Australia) Alistair Presnell	73-75-76-79=303	+23	17,965
T67	(United States) Kevin Sutherland	73-74-84-72=303	+23	17,965
71	(Sweden) Robert Karlsson	74-72-86-73=305	+25	17,165
72	(England) Simon Khan	74-74-82-76=306	+26	16,844
73	(United States) Kyle Stanley	71-74-85-78=308	+28	16,523
CUT	(Australia) Aaron Baddeley	75-74=149	+9	
CUT	(South Africa) Tim Clark	70-79=149	+9	
CUT	(Sweden) Peter Hanson	74-75=149	+9	
CUT	(United States) Justin Hicks	76-73=149	+9	
CUT	(Sweden) Freddie Jacobson	73-76=149	+9	
CUT	(United States) Cliff Kresge	75-74=149	+9	
CUT	(United States) Doug LaBelle II	75-74=149	+9	
CUT	(Italy) Matteo Manassero	75-74=149	+9	
CUT	(South Africa) Rory Sabbatini	77-72=149	+9	
CUT	(United States) Michael Thompson	71-78=149	+9	
CUT	(United States) Chris Williams (a)	75-74=149	+9	
CUT	(United States) Stewart Cink	72-78=150	+10	
CUT	(Scotland) Chris Doak	73-77=150	+10	
CUT	(United States) Steven Fox (a)	76-74=150	+10	
CUT	(Japan) Hiroyuki Fujita	76-74=150	+10	
CUT	(United States) Morgan Hoffmann	76-74=150	+10	
CUT	(United States) Ted Potter Jr.	76-74=150	+10	
CUT	(United States) Kevin Streelman	72-78=150	+10	
CUT	(United States) Brian Stuard	75-75=150	+10	
CUT	(South Africa) Jaco van Zyl	73-77=150	+10	
CUT	(United States) Casey Wittenberg	79-71=150	+10	
CUT	(South Korea) Bae Sang-moon	77-74=151	+11	
CUT	(United States) Bill Haas	77-74=151	+11	
CUT	(United States) Gavin Hall (a)	74-77=151	+11	
CUT	(United States) Max Homa (a)	73-78=151	+11	
CUT	(United States) Zach Johnson	74-77=151	+11	
CUT	(United States) Ryan Nelson	73-78=151	+11	
CUT	(United States) D. A. Points	77-74=151	+11	
CUT	(United States) Andrew Svoboda	81-70=151	+11	
CUT	(United States) Nick Watney	73-78=151	+11	
CUT	(United States) Boo Weekley	75-76=151	+11	
CUT	(United States) Keegan Bradley	77-75=152	+12	
CUT	(United States) Brandon Brown	75-77=152	+12	
CUT	(Australia) Marcus Fraser	79-73=152	+12	
CUT	(United States) Luke Guthrie	73-79=152	+12	
CUT	(Italy) Francesco Molinari	78-74=152	+12	
CUT	(United States) Brendan Steele	76-76=152	+12	
CUT	(United States) David Toms	75-77=152	+12	
CUT	(South Korea) Yang Yong-eun	77-75=152	+12	
CUT	(South Africa) Branden Grace	70-83=153	+13	
CUT	(United States) John Hahn	75-78=153	+13	
CUT	(Canada) Mackenzie Hughes	75-78=153	+13	
CUT	(United States) Randall Hutchison	74-79=153	+13	
CUT	(South Korea) Hwang Jung-gon	75-78=153	+13	
CUT	(Thailand) Thongchai Jaidee	79-74=153	+13	
CUT	(Australia) Marc Leishman	78-75=153	+13	
CUT	(Northern Ireland) Graeme McDowell (c)	76-77=153	+13	
CUT	(United States) Geoffrey Sisk	78-75=153	+13	
CUT	(United States) Jordan Spieth	77-76=153	+13	
CUT	(Canada) Ryan Yip	76-77=153	+13	
CUT	(United States) Jay Don Blake	74-80=154	+14	
CUT	(New Zealand) Michael Campbell (c)	76-78=154	+14	
CUT	(Argentina) Estanislao Goya	71-83=154	+14	
CUT	(United States) Brandt Jobe	74-80=154	+14	
CUT	(United States) Ryan Palmer	75-79=154	+14	
CUT	(England) Eddie Pepperell	77-77=154	+14	
CUT	(United States) Scott Piercy	78-76=154	+14	
CUT	(United States) Jesse Smith	73-81=154	+14	
CUT	(Argentina) Ángel Cabrera (c)	74-81=155	+15	
CUT	(Northern Ireland) Darren Clarke	80-75=155	+15	
CUT	(United States) Wil Collins	76-79=155	+15	
CUT	(Sweden) Rikard Karlberg	78-77=155	+15	
CUT	(United States) Harold Varner III	76-79=155	+15	
CUT	(United States) Jim Furyk (c)	77-79=156	+16	
CUT	(United States) Lucas Glover (c)	74-82=156	+16	
CUT	(United States) Ryan Moore	79-77=156	+16	
CUT	(United States) Joe Ogilvie	75-81=156	+16	
CUT	(Spain) José María Olazábal	75-81=156	+16	
CUT	(Canada) Adam Hadwin	81-76=157	+17	
CUT	(United States) Russell Henley	77-80=157	+17	
CUT	(United States) Zack Fischer	82-76=158	+18	
CUT	(Denmark) Thorbjørn Olesen	79-79=158	+18	
CUT	(Japan) Yoshinobu Tsukada	78-80=158	+18	
CUT	(United States) Brandon Crick	81-78=159	+19	
CUT	(United States) Matt Harmon	78-81=159	+19	
CUT	(United States) Cory McElyea (a)	81-79=160	+20	
CUT	(United States) Roger Tambellini	80-80=160	+20	
CUT	(Japan) Yui Ueda	78-83=161	+21	
CUT	(United States) John Nieporte	78-84=162	+22	
CUT	(United States) Ryan Sullivan	81-82=163	+23	
CUT	(United States) Grayson Murray (a)	83-81=164	+24	
WD	(South Africa) Louis Oosthuizen	75	+5	
WD	(United States) Robert Garrigus	80	+10	

==== Scorecard ====
Hole	1	2	3	4	5	6	7	8	9	10	11	12	13	14	15	16	17	18
Par	4	5	3	5	4	4	4	4	3	4	4	4	3	4	4	4	3	4
(England) Rose	+1	+1	+2	+1	+2	+1	E	E	E	E	+1	E	-1	E	E	+1	+1	+1
(Australia) Day	+2	+2	+2	+1	+2	+2	+2	+1	+1	E	+1	+1	+1	+2	+2	+2	+2	+3
(United States) Mickelson	−1	−1	+1	E	+2	+2	+2	+2	+2	E	E	E	+1	+1	+2	+2	+2	+3
(United States) Dufner	+7	+7	+7	+7	+7	+7	+6	+6	+6	+5	+5	+4	+3	+3	+6	+5	+5	+5
(South Africa) Els	+5	+4	+5	+5	+7	+7	+6	+6	+6	+6	+6	+6	+6	+6	+5	+5	+4	+5
(United States) Horschel	+1	+2	+3	+3	+4	+3	+3	+3	+4	+4	+5	+4	+5	+5	+5	+5	+5	+5
(United States) Mahan	E	E	E	E	E	+1	+1	+1	+1	+1	+1	+1	+1	+1	+3	+3	+4	+5
(England) Donald	+1	+1	+2	+3	+4	+6	+5	+6	+7	+6	+6	+5	+6	+6	+6	+6	+6	+6
(United States) Stricker	E	+3	+4	+4	+5	+5	+5	+5	+5	+5	+5	+5	+4	+5	+6	+6	+6	+6
(United States) Fowler	+3	+4	+4	+4	+5	+5	+5	+5	+5	+5	+5	+5	+4	+4	+5	+5	+6	+7
(South Africa) Schwartzel	−1	−1	E	+1	+2	+4	+5	+5	+6	+7	+6	+6	+6	+6	+6	+7	+8	+8

Cumulative tournament scores, relative to par

Eagle	Birdie	Bogey	Double bogey	Triple bogey+
