= Small Business Connection Championship =

Golf tournament

Tournament information
- Location: Charlotte, North Carolina
- Established: 2010
- Course: River Run Country Club
- Par: 72
- Length: 7,317 yards (6,691 m)
- Tour: Web.com Tour
- Format: Stroke play
- Prize fund: US$1,000,000
- Month played: September
- Final year: 2015

Tournament record score
- Aggregate: 261 Tommy Gainey (2010)
- To par: −27 as above

Final champion
- (United States) Chez Reavie
- Location in the United States Location in North Carolina

The Small Business Connection Championship was a golf tournament on the Web.com Tour. It was played for the first time as the Chiquita Classic in July 2010 at TPC River's Bend in Cincinnati, Ohio. The tournament was moved to River Run Country Club in Davidson, North Carolina in 2012.

From 2013 to 2015, it was part of the Web.com Tour Finals and the field consisted of the top 75 players from the Web.com Tour money list and the players ranked 126 to 200 on the PGA Tour's money list at the start of the Finals; the purse was set at US$1,000,000, with $180,000 going to the winner.

== Winners ==
Web.com Tour (Finals)	2013–2015
Web.com Tour (Regular)	2010–2012

#	Year	Winner	Score	To par	Margin of victory	Runner(s)-up
Small Business Connection Championship
6th	2015	(United States) Chez Reavie	273	−15	1 stroke	(Argentina) Emiliano Grillo (United States) Jamie Lovemark (United States) Steve Marino
Chiquita Classic
5th	2014	(Canada) Adam Hadwin	270	−18	2 strokes	(United States) John Peterson
4th	2013	(United States) Andrew Svoboda	276	−12	Playoff	(United States) Will MacKenzie
3rd	2012	(United States) Russell Henley	266	−22	Playoff	(United States) Patrick Cantlay (United States) Morgan Hoffmann
2nd	2011	(Scotland) Russell Knox	263	−25	3 strokes	(United States) Billy Hurley III
1st	2010	(United States) Tommy Gainey	261	−27	3 strokes	(United States) Joe Affrunti
