= Tom Carter (golfer) =

American professional golfer (born 1968)

Personal information
- Nationality: United States
- Born: January 20, 1968 (age 58) Abington, Pennsylvania, U.S.
- Height: 5 ft 11 in (1.80 m)
- Weight: 190 lb (86 kg; 14 st)

Career
- Sport: Golf
- College: Temple University
- Turned professional: 1992
- Former tours: PGA Tour; Nationwide Tour; Golden Bear Tour
- Professional wins: 6

Number of wins by tour
- Korn Ferry Tour: 3
- Other: 3

Best results in major championships
- Masters Tournament: DNP
- PGA Championship: DNP
- U.S. Open: T55: 2004
- The Open Championship: DNP

Tom Carter (born January 20, 1968) is an American professional golfer. He was born in Abington, Pennsylvania.

== Professional career ==
Carter played on the Nationwide Tour in 2001-03 and 2005-09. He won three Nationwide Tour events in 2003 and that gave him an immediate promotion to the PGA Tour. He played on the PGA Tour for part of the 2003 season and all of 2004.

== Professional wins (6) ==
=== Nationwide Tour wins (3) ===
No.	Date	Tournament	Winning score	Margin of victory	Runner(s)-up
1	Jul 6, 2003	Samsung Canadian PGA Championship	−9 (70-69-66-70=275)	Playoff	(United States) Jason Bohn
2	Aug, 17 2003	Price Cutter Charity Championship	−21 (66-68-68-65=267)	1 stroke	(United States) Doug LaBelle II, (United States) Roland Thatcher
3	Aug 31, 2003	Alberta Calgary Classic	−17 (68-68-62-65=263)	5 strokes	(United States) Nick Cassini

Nationwide Tour playoff record (1–0)

No.	Year	Tournament	Opponent	Result
1	2003	Samsung Canadian PGA Championship	(United States) Jason Bohn	Won with par on first extra hole

=== Golden Bear Tour wins (3) ===
No.	Date	Tournament	Winning score	Margin of victory	Runner(s)-up
1	Jun 24, 1998	Hammock Creek and Martin Downs	−19 (65-69-63=197)	2 strokes	(United States) Ed Humenik
2	Jun 22, 2000	Canon USA Classic	−14 (63-71-68=202)	4 strokes	(United States) Layne Savole, (United States) Adam Spring
3	Jun 29, 2000	Nicklaus Apparel Classic	−15 (70-62-69=201)	3 strokes	(United States) Jason Dufner, (United States) Tim Petrovic

== Results in major championships ==
Tournament	2004
U.S. Open	T55

"T" = tied
Note: Carter only played in the U.S. Open.

== See also ==
- 2003 Nationwide Tour graduates
