= Lee Williams (golfer) =

American professional golfer

Personal information
- Nationality: United States
- Born: December 27, 1981 (age 44) Alexander City, Alabama, U.S.
- Height: 5 ft 9 in (1.75 m)
- Weight: 165 lb (75 kg; 11.8 st)

Career
- Sport: Golf
- College: Auburn University
- Turned professional: 2005
- Former tours: PGA Tour; Web.com Tour
- Professional wins: 4

Number of wins by tour
- Korn Ferry Tour: 1
- Other: 3

Best results in major championships
- Masters Tournament: DNP
- PGA Championship: DNP
- U.S. Open: T40: 2006
- The Open Championship: DNP

Lee Williams (born December 27, 1981) is an American professional golfer who played on the PGA Tour.

== Early life and amateur career ==
Williams was born in Alexander City, Alabama. He had a successful amateur career, representing the United States in the Walker Cup in 2003 and 2005. He played college golf at Auburn University. He graduated in 2005.

== Professional career ==
In 2005, he turned pro. Williams played on the US Pro Golf Tour and the NGA Pro Golf Tour before settling into the Nationwide Tour in 2012. He picked up his first win on the Nationwide Tour on June 10 at the Mexico Open. He finished 16th on the money list to earn his PGA Tour card for 2013.

Williams made only 9 cuts in 22 events in 2013, and ranked 196th in the money list. He played in the Web.com Tour Finals and finished 31st to retain his PGA Tour card for 2014. In 2013–14, he played in only 13 events due to injury. He has not played in a PGA Tour event since the 2014 FedEx St. Jude Classic.

== Amateur wins (4) ==
- 2001 Greystone Invitational
- 2002 Southern Amateur
- 2003 Dogwood Invitational, Greystone Invitational

== Professional wins (4) ==
=== Web.com Tour wins (1) ===
No.	Date	Tournament	Winning score	Margin of victory	Runner-up
1	Jun 10, 2012	Mexico Open	−14 (69-67-68-70=274)	1 stroke	(United States) Paul Haley II

=== Other wins (3) ===
- 2 wins on the US Pro Golf Tour, 1 on the NGA Pro Golf Tour

== Results in major championships ==
Tournament	2005	2006	2007
U.S. Open	CUT	T40	CUT

CUT = missed the half-way cut
"T" = tied
Note: Williams only played in the U.S. Open.

== U.S. national team appearances ==
Amateur

- Walker Cup: 2003, 2005 (winners)
- Eisenhower Trophy: 2004 (winners)

== See also ==
- 2012 Web.com Tour graduates
- 2013 Web.com Tour Finals graduates
