= Shawn Stefani =

American golfer

Personal information
- Full name: Shawn Anthony Peter Stefani
- Nationality: United States
- Born: December 2, 1981 (age 44) Baytown, Texas, U.S.
- Height: 6 ft 2 in (1.88 m)
- Weight: 200 lb (91 kg; 14 st)

Career
- Sport: Golf
- College: Lamar University
- Turned professional: 2005
- Current tour: PGA Tour
- Former tour: Web.com Tour
- Professional wins: 4
- Highest ranking: 79 (May 24, 2015)

Number of wins by tour
- Korn Ferry Tour: 2
- Other: 2

Best results in major championships
- Masters Tournament: DNP
- PGA Championship: 68th: 2014
- U.S. Open: T59: 2013
- The Open Championship: CUT: 2014

Shawn Anthony Peter Stefani (born December 2, 1981) is an American professional golfer, currently playing on the PGA Tour.

== Career ==
Born in Baytown, Texas, Stefani played college golf at Lamar University, graduating in 2005. He turned professional that year and played on mini-tours until 2012, when he joined the Web.com Tour and won twice. He got his first tour win at the Midwest Classic in August, and his second in October at the Miccosukee Championship. He finished sixth on the 2012 money list to earn his PGA Tour card for the 2013 season.

During the final round of the U.S. Open in 2013 at Merion, Stefani carded a hole-in-one on the 229-yard (209 m) 17th hole, the first ace ever recorded in 18 USGA championships held at Merion. His 4-iron tee shot bounced off the slope left of the green and rolled a considerable distance into the cup.

== Professional wins (4) ==
=== Web.com Tour wins (2) ===
No.	Date	Tournament	Winning score	Margin of victory	Runners-up
1	Aug 19, 2012	Midwest Classic	−17 (68-68-67-64=267)	2 strokes	(United States) Russell Henley, (United States) Luke List
2	Oct 14, 2012	Miccosukee Championship	−15 (68-71-62-68=269)	5 strokes	(Australia) Alistair Presnell

=== NGA Hooters Tour wins (1) ===
No.	Date	Tournament	Winning score	Margin of victory	Runner-up
1	Aug 2, 2009	Onion Creek Classic	−22 (64-67-64-63=258)	3 strokes	(United States) Martin Flores

=== Other wins (1) ===
- 2011 Texas State Open

== Playoff record ==
PGA Tour playoff record (0–1)

No.	Year	Tournament	Opponent	Result
1	2014	Quicken Loans National	(England) Justin Rose	Lost to par on first extra hole

== Results in major championships ==
Tournament	2009	2010	2011	2012	2013	2014	2015
Masters Tournament							
U.S. Open	CUT				T59		
The Open Championship						CUT	
PGA Championship						68	CUT

Did not play

CUT = missed the half-way cut
"T" indicates a tie for a place

== See also ==
- 2012 Web.com Tour graduates
- 2017 Web.com Tour Finals graduates
- 2018 Web.com Tour Finals graduates
