= Winn-Dixie Jacksonville Open =

Tournament information
- Location: Ponte Vedra Beach, Florida
- Established: 2010
- Courses: TPC Sawgrass (Dye's Valley Course)
- Par: 70
- Length: 6,847 yards (6,261 m)
- Tour: Web.com Tour
- Format: Stroke play
- Prize fund: US$600,000
- Month played: October
- Final year: 2012

Tournament record score
- Aggregate: 270 Russell Henley (2012)
- To par: −10 as above

Final champion
- (United States) Russell Henley
- Location in the United States Location in Florida

The Winn-Dixie Jacksonville Open was a golf tournament on the Web.com Tour from 2010 to 2012. It was played for the first time in October 2010 at TPC Sawgrass's Dye's Valley Course in Ponte Vedra Beach, Florida. The 2012 purse was US$600,000, with $108,000 going to the winner.

== Winners ==
Year	Winner	Score	To par	Margin of victory	Runner(s)-up
2012	(United States) Russell Henley	270	−10	Playoff	(United States) B. J. Staten
2011	(Australia) Gavin Coles	274	−6	1 stroke	(Sweden) Jonas Blixt
2010	(United States) David Mathis	272	−8	1 stroke	(United States) Jeff Curl (Australia) Won Joon Lee (United States) Kyle Reifers
