= Peter Tomasulo =

American professional golfer (born 1981)

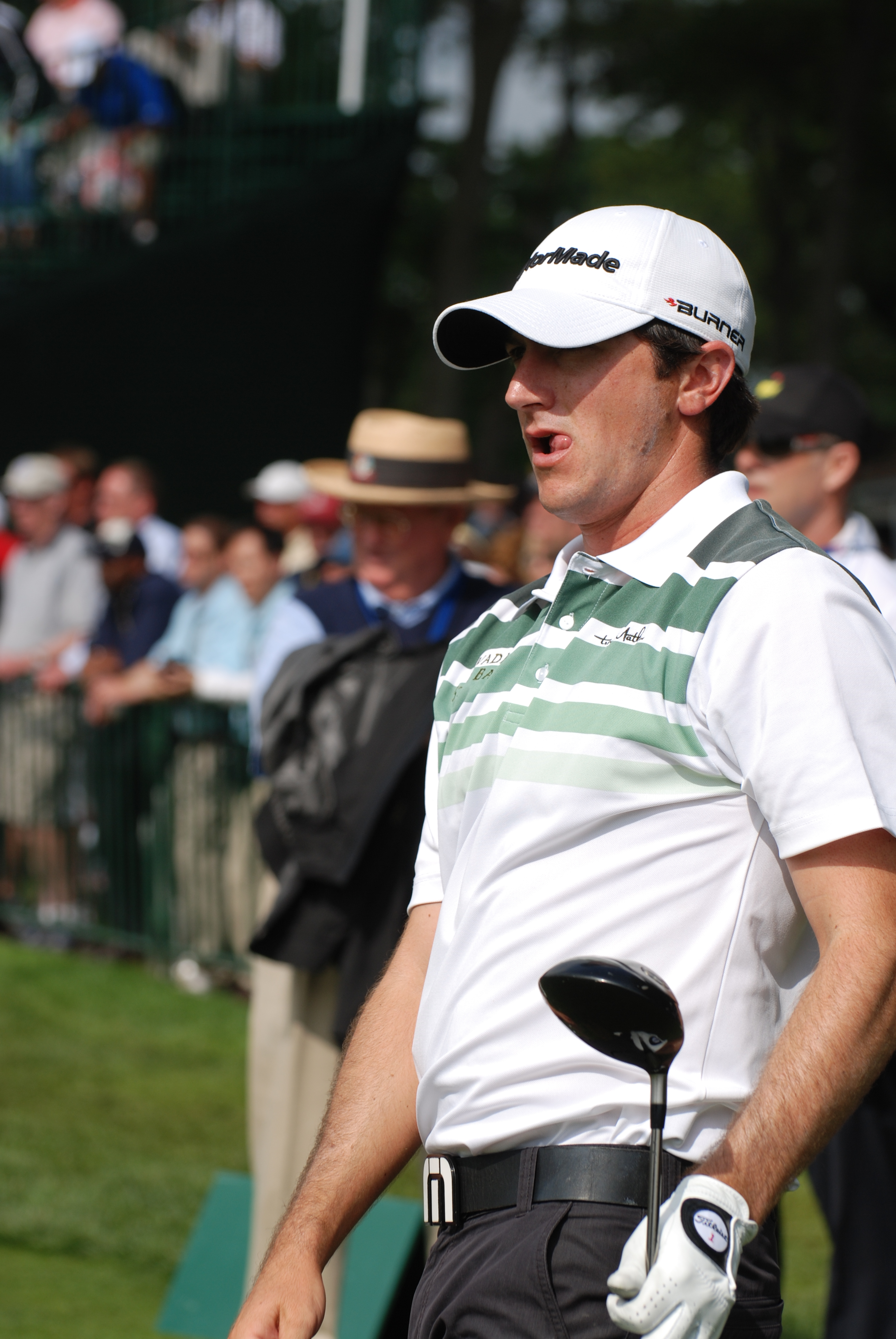
- Tomasulo at the 2009 U.S. Open

Personal information
- Full name: Peter Jeffrey Tomasulo
- Nationality: United States
- Born: October 22, 1981 (age 45) Long Beach, California, U.S.
- Height: 5 ft 10 in (1.78 m)
- Weight: 165 lb (75 kg; 11.8 st)

Career
- Sport: Golf
- College: University of California, Berkeley
- Turned professional: 2004
- Current tour: Web.com Tour
- Former tours: PGA Tour; Canadian Tour
- Professional wins: 5

Number of wins by tour
- Korn Ferry Tour: 3
- Other: 2

Best results in major championships
- Masters Tournament: DNP
- PGA Championship: DNP
- U.S. Open: CUT: 2008, 2009
- The Open Championship: DNP

Peter Jeffrey Tomasulo (born October 22, 1981) is an American professional golfer who plays on the Web.com Tour.

== Amateur career ==
Tomasulo was born in Long Beach, California. He attended the University of California, Berkeley and in 2004 was named a first team All-American and captained California's NCAA championship team. In 2003 he set the school's all-time single-season stroke average at 70.98 and played on the U.S. Palmer Cup team that lost 14-10 to Europe.

== Professional career ==
In 2004, Tomasulo turned professional. In 2005 he played on the Canadian Tour and the Nationwide Tour and won once on each tour. He won the Montreal Open on the Canadian Tour and the Alberta Classic on the Nationwide Tour. He also won his hometown Long Beach Open. 2005 was the only year he played on the Canadian Tour but Tomasulo continued to play on the Nationwide Tour until 2008. In 2008, 7 top-10 finishes helped him earn $296,704 and finish 11th on the money list. By finishing in the top 25 of the Nationwide Tour's money list, he earned his PGA Tour card for 2009. He struggled on the PGA Tour, making only 5 of 25 cuts and losing his tour card. He played on the Nationwide Tour again in 2010, winning the Ford Wayne Gretzky Classic in July. He finished the year 23rd on the money list and earned his 2011 PGA Tour card. He battled injuries in 2011 and 2012 before returning to the Web.com Tour (formerly the Nationwide Tour). He won in his second tournament back, defeating David Lingmerth in a playoff at the United Leasing Championship. For 2013, Tomasulo has a Medical Extension available on the PGA Tour with 12 starts.

== Professional wins (5) ==
=== Web.com Tour wins (3) ===
No.	Date	Tournament	Winning score	Margin of victory	Runner-up
1	Sep 4, 2005	Alberta Classic	−13 (73-61-72-69=275)	2 strokes	(United States) Aaron Barber
2	Jul 11, 2010	Ford Wayne Gretzky Classic	−24 (67-66-67-61=261)	1 stroke	(United States) Keegan Bradley
3	Jul 1, 2012	United Leasing Championship	−11 (70-72-65-70=277)	Playoff	(Sweden) David Lingmerth

Web.com Tour playoff record (1–0)

No.	Year	Tournament	Opponent	Result
1	2012	United Leasing Championship	(Sweden) David Lingmerth	Won with par on fourth extra hole

=== Canadian Tour wins (1) ===
No.	Date	Tournament	Winning score	Margin of victory	Runner-up
1	Aug 7, 2005	Lexus Montreal Open	−6 (68-67-68-71=274)	3 strokes	(United States) Michael Harris

=== Other wins (1) ===
- 2005 Long Beach Open

== Results in major championships ==
Tournament	2008	2009
The Masters		
U.S. Open	CUT	CUT
The Open Championship		
PGA Championship		

Did not play

CUT = missed the half-way cut

== U.S. national team appearances ==
Amateur

- Palmer Cup: 2003

== See also ==
- 2008 Nationwide Tour graduates
- 2010 Nationwide Tour graduates
