= Ford Wayne Gretzky Classic =

Tournament information
- Location: Thornbury, Ontario, Canada
- Established: 2008
- Courses: Georgian Bay Club; Raven Golf Club
- Par: 71 (GB); 72 (R)
- Length: 7,139 yards (6,528 m) (GB); 7,105 yards (6,497 m) (R)
- Tour: Nationwide Tour
- Format: Stroke play
- Prize fund: US$800,099
- Month played: July
- Final year: 2010

Tournament record score
- Aggregate: 261 Peter Tomasulo (2010)
- To par: −24 as above

Final champion
- (United States) Peter Tomasulo
- Location in the Canada Location in Ontario

The Ford Wayne Gretzky Classic was a golf tournament on the Nationwide Tour from 2008 to 2010. It was played at the Georgian Bay Club in Clarksburg and the Raven Golf Club at Lora Bay in Thornbury, Ontario, Canada.

The 2010 purse was US$800,099, with $144,018 going to the winner. The extra $99 was a homage to Wayne Gretzky, the tournament host and Hall of Fame hockey player who wore the number 99 during his career.

== Winners ==
Year	Winner	Score	To par	Margin of victory	Runner-up
2010	(United States) Peter Tomasulo	261	−24	1 stroke	(United States) Keegan Bradley
2009	(United States) Roger Tambellini	265	−20	4 strokes	(United States) Blake Adams
2008	(United States) Justin Hicks	269	−16	Playoff	(United States) Casey Wittenberg
