= 2012 Web.com Tour graduates =

This is a list of players who graduated from the Web.com Tour in 2012. The top 25 players on the Web.com Tour's money list in 2012 earned their PGA Tour card for 2013.

	2012 Web.com Tour		2013 PGA Tour					
Player	Money list rank	Earnings ($)	Starts	Cuts made	Best finish	Money list rank	Earnings ($)	FedEx Cup rank
(United States) Casey Wittenberg	1	433,453	27	8	T8	148	425,395	164
(United States) Luke Guthrie*	2	410,593	27	14	3	83	991,902	90
(United States) Russell Henley*	3	400,116	24	17	Win	33	2,008,026	44
(United States) Luke List*	4	363,206	24	9	T16	173	264,401	163
(United States) James Hahn*	5	337,530	26	13	T3	98	853,507	110
(United States) Shawn Stefani*	6	307,371	21	11	T7 (twice)	134	511,399	135
(United States) Robert Streb*	7	305,591	25	12	T11	141	454,871	126
(United States) Ben Kohles*	8	303,397	25	12	T7	150	419,416	148
(United States) Justin Bolli	9	300,924	23	6	T4 (twice)	131	545,187	150
(Sweden) David Lingmerth*	10	287,148	23	11	T2 (twice)	46	1,748,109	75
(United States) Justin Hicks	11	277,159	25	16	T7	111	732,742	116
(United States) Paul Haley II*	12	263,841	18	3	T29	210	73,006	205
(Australia) Cameron Percy	13	256,238	21	13	T14	169	277,336	158
(United States) Andres Gonzales	14	235,505	17	3	T8	188	179,387	198
(Australia) Scott Gardiner*	15	234,415	23	7	T15	177	219,645	177
(United States) Lee Williams*	16	223,468	22	9	T33	196	133,755	182
(United States) Darron Stiles	17	213,031	20	5	T13	187	184,866	188
(Canada) Brad Fritsch*	18	212,168	24	18	T9	142	452,184	129
(United States) Morgan Hoffmann*	19	207,540	20	11	T5	96	871,003	117
(United States) Brian Stuard	20	205,711	25	15	T4	79	1,032,028	92
(United States) Andrew Svoboda*	21	203,717	18	5	T37	207	77,219	202
(United States) Nicholas Thompson	22	192,751	29	20	4	87	959,434	60
(Australia) Alistair Presnell*	23	190,567	23	8	T29	191	163,134	180
(United States) Doug LaBelle II	24	186,320	23	14	T18	157	338,921	147
(United States) Jim Herman	25	182,001	19	10	T9	139	490,756	139

*PGA Tour rookie in 2013

- Retained his PGA Tour card for 2014: won or finished in the top 125 of the money list or FedEx Cup points list.
- Retained PGA Tour conditional status and qualified for the Web.com Tour Finals: finished between 126–150 on FedEx Cup list and qualified for Web.com Tour Finals.
- Failed to retain his PGA Tour card for 2014 but qualified for the Web.com Tour Finals: finished between 150–200 on FedEx Cup list.
- Failed to retain his PGA Tour card for 2014 and to qualify for the Web.com Tour Finals: finished outside the top 200 on FedEx Cup list.

Scott Gardiner, Lee Williams, Brad Fritsch, and Jim Herman regained their cards for 2014 through the Web.com Tour Finals. Andrew Svoboda played a few events on the Web.com Tour in 2013, and a win at the Price Cutter Charity Championship led to him finishing 25th on the regular season money list, giving him a PGA Tour card for 2014.

== Winners on the PGA Tour in 2013 ==
No.	Date	Player	Tournament	Winning score	Margin of victory	Runner-up	Payout ($)
1	Jan 13	(United States) Russell Henley	Sony Open in Hawaii	−24 (63-63-67-63=256)	3 strokes	(South Africa) Tim Clark	1,008,000

== Runners-up on the PGA Tour in 2013 ==
No.	Date	Player	Tournament	Winner	Winning score	Runner-up score	Payout ($)
1	Jan 20	(Sweden) David Lingmerth lost in three-man playoff	Humana Challenge	(United States) Brian Gay	−25 (67-66-67-63=263)	−25 (68-64-69-62=263)	492,800
2	May 12	(Sweden) David Lingmerth	The Players Championship	(United States) Tiger Woods	−13 (67-67-71-70=275)	−11 (68-68-69-72=277)	709,333

== See also ==
- 2012 PGA Tour Qualifying School graduates
