= 2012 U.S. Open (golf) =

Coordinates: 37.709°N 122.495°W

Tournament information
- Dates: June 14–17, 2012
- Location: San Francisco, California
- Courses: Olympic Club, Lake Course
- Organized by: USGA
- Tours: PGA Tour; European Tour; Japan Golf Tour

Statistics
- Par: 70
- Length: 7,170 yards (6,556 m)
- Field: 156 players, 72 after cut
- Cut: 148 (+8)
- Prize fund: $8,000,000 €6,433,972
- Winner's share: $1,440,000 €1,158,115

Champion
- (United States) Webb Simpson
- 281 (+1)

The 2012 United States Open Championship was the 112th U.S. Open, played June 14–17 at the Olympic Club in San Francisco, California. Webb Simpson won his first major title, one stroke ahead of runners-up Graeme McDowell and Michael Thompson.

== Venue ==
This was the fifth U.S. Open at the Olympic Club, all played at the Lake Course. In 1955, unheralded Jack Fleck defeated Ben Hogan in an 18-hole playoff. In 1966, Billy Casper staged one of the greatest comebacks in U.S. Open history, erasing a seven-stroke deficit on the final nine holes to tie Arnold Palmer, then prevailed in an 18-hole playoff. In 1987, Scott Simpson won by a stroke over 8-time major winner Tom Watson. In 1998, Lee Janzen won his second U.S. Open, one stroke ahead of Payne Stewart.

=== Course layout ===
Olympic Club - Lake Course

Hole	1	2	3	4	5	6	7	8	9	Out	10	11	12	13	14	15	16	17	18	In	Total
Yards	520	428	247	438	498	489	288	200	449	3,557	424	430	451	199	419	154	670	522	344	3,613	7,170
Par	4	4	3	4	4	4	4	3	4	34	4	4	4	3	4	3	5	5	4	36	70

Lengths of the course for previous major championships:

Location in the United States
Location in California
- 6,797 yards (6,215 m), par 70 - 1998 U.S. Open
- 6,709 yards (6,135 m), par 70 - 1987 U.S. Open
- 6,719 yards (6,144 m), par 70 - 1966 U.S. Open
- 6,700 yards (6,126 m), par 70 - 1955 U.S. Open

One unique aspect of the course was that players began the first and second rounds on the 1st and 9th tees, rather than the 1st and 10th tees, as is typical. This was due to the 8th green and 9th tee being located far closer to the clubhouse than the 10th tee.

== Changes to cuts ==
For 2012, the USGA changed the rule governing which players would make the cut after 36 holes. Now, only the top 60 players, plus those tied, would make the cut, instead of also including those players within ten strokes of the leader.

== Field ==
About half the field each year consists of players who are fully exempt from qualifying for the U.S. Open. The players who have qualified for the 2012 U.S. Open are listed below. Each player is classified according to the first category in which he qualified, but other categories are shown in parentheses.

The qualification categories changed substantially in 2012. Seven categories (9 and 11 to 16, from 2011) were eliminated. These categories exempted top finishers on the money lists of various tours and multiple PGA Tour winners. Three categories were added (3, 4, and 9 below), for the winners of The Amateur Championship, the Mark H. McCormack Medal, and the BMW PGA Championship. Two categories were expanded (13 and 14 below), to include the top 60 instead of the top 50 in the Official World Golf Ranking.

1. Last 10 U.S. Open Champions

- Ángel Cabrera (5)
- Michael Campbell
- Jim Furyk (13,14)
- Lucas Glover
- Retief Goosen
- Graeme McDowell (13,14)
- Rory McIlroy (11,13,14)
- Geoff Ogilvy (12,13,14)
- Tiger Woods (7,13,14)

2. Top two finishers in the 2011 U.S. Amateur

- Patrick Cantlay (a,4)
- Kelly Kraft forfeited his invitation by turning pro in April 2012.

3. Winner of the 2011 British Amateur

- Bryden Macpherson forfeited his invitation by turning pro in April 2012.

4. Winner of the 2011 Mark H. McCormack Medal

5. Last five Masters Champions

- Trevor Immelman
- Phil Mickelson (12,13,14)
- Charl Schwartzel (11,13,14)
- Bubba Watson (12,13,14)

6. Last five British Open Champions

- Stewart Cink
- Pádraig Harrington (7)
- Louis Oosthuizen (11,13,14)
- Darren Clarke withdrew after a groin injury.

7. Last five PGA Champions

- Keegan Bradley (12,13,14)
- Martin Kaymer (13,14)
- Yang Yong-eun (11,12)

8. Last three Players Champions

- K. J. Choi (12,13,14)
- Tim Clark
- Matt Kuchar (12,13,14)

9. Winner of the 2012 BMW PGA Championship

- Luke Donald (12,13,14)

10. The U.S. Senior Open Champion

- Olin Browne

11. Top 10 finishers and ties in the 2011 U.S. Open

- Kevin Chappell
- Jason Day (12,13,14)
- Sergio García (13,14)
- Robert Garrigus
- Peter Hanson (13,14)
- Lee Westwood (13,14)

12. All players qualifying for the 2011 edition of The Tour Championship

- Aaron Baddeley (13,14)
- Jonathan Byrd (13,14)
- Jason Dufner (13,14)
- Bill Haas (13,14)
- Charles Howell III
- Freddie Jacobson (13,14)
- Dustin Johnson (13,14)
- Hunter Mahan (13,14)
- Chez Reavie
- Justin Rose (13,14)
- Adam Scott (13,14)
- John Senden (13,14)
- Webb Simpson (13,14)
- Vijay Singh
- Steve Stricker (13,14)
- David Toms (13,14)
- Bo Van Pelt (13,14)
- Nick Watney (13,14)
- Mark Wilson (13,14)
- Gary Woodland
- Brandt Snedeker (13,14) withdrew with a rib injury.

13. Top 60 on the Official World Golf Ranking list as of May 21, 2012

- Bae Sang-moon (14)
- Thomas Bjørn (14)
- Rafa Cabrera-Bello (14)
- Nicolas Colsaerts (14)
- Ben Crane (14)
- Simon Dyson (14)
- Ernie Els (14)
- Gonzalo Fernández-Castaño (14)
- Rickie Fowler (14)
- Anders Hansen (14)
- Ryo Ishikawa
- Miguel Ángel Jiménez
- Zach Johnson (14)
- Robert Karlsson (14)
- Kim Kyung-tae (14)
- Martin Laird (14)
- Francesco Molinari (14)
- Kevin Na (14)
- Carl Pettersson (14)
- Ian Poulter (14)
- Álvaro Quirós (14)
- Robert Rock (14)
- Kyle Stanley (14)
- Paul Lawrie decided not to play.
- Paul Casey withdrew after a shoulder injury.

14. Top 60 on the Official World Golf Ranking list as of June 11, 2012

- Branden Grace
- Spencer Levin

15. Special exemptions selected by the USGA

- None

=== Qualifiers ===
- Japan: Hiroyuki Fujita, Brendan Jones, Lee Dong-hwan, Park Jae-bum, Tadahiro Takayama, Toru Taniguchi
- England: Matthew Baldwin, Grégory Bourdy, George Coetzee, Mikko Ilonen, Raphaël Jacquelin, Søren Kjeldsen, Peter Lawrie, Matteo Manassero, Alex Norén, Lee Slattery, Marc Warren
- United States

- Daly City, California: Michael Allen, Matt Bettencourt, Alex Čejka, James Hahn, Beau Hossler (a), Alberto Sanchez (a), Scott Smith (L)
- Lecanto, Florida: Brooks Koepka (a), Scott Langley (L), Sam Osborne (L)
- Suwanee, Georgia: Jason Bohn, Tim Weinhart, Casey Wittenberg
- Glen Ellyn, Illinois: Tim Herron, Anthony Summers
- Rockville, Maryland: Shane Bertsch, Paul Claxton, Jeff Curl (L), Cole Howard, Darron Stiles, Michael Thompson, Nicholas Thompson (L)
- Summit, New Jersey: Brian Gaffney (L), Jim Herman (L), Mark McCormick (L), Cameron Wilson (a)
- Columbus, Ohio: Blake Adams, Martin Flores, Brian Harman, Morgan Hoffmann (L), Steve LeBrun (L), Edward Loar, Davis Love III, Steve Marino, David Mathis, Dennis Miller, Jesse Mueller (L), Rod Pampling, Scott Piercy, D. A. Points, Kevin Streelman, Charlie Wi
- Springfield, Ohio: Brice Garnett, John Peterson (L)
- Creswell, Oregon: Casey Martin, Nick Sherwood (a)
- Memphis, Tennessee: Stephen Ames, Tommy Biershenk, Roberto Castro, Joe Durant, Hunter Haas, Hunter Hamrick (L), Bill Lunde, Joe Ogilvie, Aaron Watkins
- Houston, Texas: Bob Estes, Alistair Presnell, Brian Rowell

Alternates who gained entry:

- Justin Hicks (Columbus) – claimed spot held for category 14
- Colt Knost (Columbus) – claimed spot held for category 14
- Kyle Thompson (Memphis) – claimed spot held for category 14
- Jordan Spieth (a, Houston) – replaced Brandt Snedeker
- Andy Zhang (a,L, Lecanto) – replaced Paul Casey. At 14, Zhang became the youngest golfer to compete in the U.S. Open since at least World War II.

(a) denotes amateur
(L) denotes player advanced through local qualifying

== Round summaries ==
=== First round ===
Thursday, June 14, 2012

Place	Player	Score	To par
1	(United States) Michael Thompson	66	−4
T2	(Northern Ireland) Graeme McDowell	69	−1
T2	(England) Justin Rose	69	−1
T2	(United States) David Toms	69	−1
T2	(United States) Nick Watney	69	−1
T2	(United States) Tiger Woods	69	−1
T7	(United States) Jason Bohn	70	E
T7	(United States) Jim Furyk	70	E
T7	(United States) Beau Hossler (a)	70	E
T7	(Sweden) Robert Karlsson	70	E
T7	(United States) Matt Kuchar	70	E
T7	(South Korea) Park Jae-bum	70	E
T7	(England) Ian Poulter	70	E
T7	(Australia) Alistair Presnell	70	E

=== Second round ===
Friday, June 15, 2012

Place	Player	Score	To par
T1	(United States) Jim Furyk	70-69=139	−1
T1	(United States) David Toms	69-70=139	−1
T1	(United States) Tiger Woods	69-70=139	−1
T4	(Belgium) Nicolas Colsaerts	72-69=141	+1
T4	(Northern Ireland) Graeme McDowell	69-72=141	+1
T4	(United States) John Peterson	71-70=141	+1
T4	(United States) Michael Thompson	66-75=141	+1
8	(United States) Blake Adams	72-70=142	+2
T9	(South Korea) K. J. Choi	73-70=143	+3
T9	(United States) Jason Dufner	72-71=143	+3
T9	(United States) Beau Hossler (a)	70-73=143	+3
T9	(Sweden) Freddie Jacobson	72-71=143	+3
T9	(France) Raphaël Jacquelin	72-71=143	+3
T9	(United States) Matt Kuchar	70-73=143	+3
T9	(United States) Hunter Mahan	72-71=143	+3
T9	(South Africa) Charl Schwartzel	73-70=143	+3
T9	(United States) Aaron Watkins	72-71=143	+3

Amateurs: Hossler (+3), Spieth (+8), Cantlay (+8), Sanchez (+9), Wilson (+14), Koepka (+14), Zhang (+17), Sherwood (+18)

=== Third round ===
Saturday, June 16, 2012

Place	Player	Score	To par
T1	(United States) Jim Furyk	70-69-70=209	−1
T1	(Northern Ireland) Graeme McDowell	69-72-68=209	−1
3	(Sweden) Freddie Jacobson	72-71-68=211	+1
T4	(United States) Blake Adams	72-70-70=212	+2
T4	(Belgium) Nicolas Colsaerts	72-69-71=212	+2
T4	(South Africa) Ernie Els	75-69-68=212	+2
T4	(England) Lee Westwood	73-72-67=212	+2
T8	(United States) Kevin Chappell	74-71-68=213	+3
T8	(United States) Jason Dufner	72-71-70=213	+3
T8	(United States) Beau Hossler (a)	70-73-70=213	+3
T8	(United States) John Peterson	71-70-72=213	+3
T8	(Australia) John Senden	72-73-68=213	+3
T8	(United States) Webb Simpson	72-73-68=213	+3

=== Final round ===
Sunday, June 17, 2012

==== Final leaderboard ====
Champion
Silver Cup winner (leading amateur)
(a) = amateur
(c) = past champion

Place	Player	Score	To par	Money ($)
1	(United States) Webb Simpson	72-73-68-68=281	+1	1,440,000
T2	(Northern Ireland) Graeme McDowell (c)	69-72-68-73=282	+2	695,916
T2	(United States) Michael Thompson	66-75-74-67=282	+2	695,916
T4	(United States) Jason Dufner	72-71-70-70=283	+3	276,841
T4	(United States) Jim Furyk (c)	70-69-70-74=283	+3	276,841
T4	(Republic of Ireland) Pádraig Harrington	74-70-71-68=283	+3	276,841
T4	(United States) John Peterson	71-70-72-70=283	+3	276,841
T4	(United States) David Toms	69-70-76-68=283	+3	276,841
9	(South Africa) Ernie Els (c)	75-69-68-72=284	+4	200,280
T10	(United States) Kevin Chappell	74-71-68-72=285	+5	163,594
T10	(South Africa) Retief Goosen (c)	75-70-69-71=285	+5	163,594
T10	(Australia) John Senden	72-73-68-72=285	+5	163,594
T10	(England) Lee Westwood	73-72-67-73=285	+5	163,594
T10	(United States) Casey Wittenberg	71-77-67-70=285	+5	163,594

Leaderboard below the top 10
Place	Player	Score	To par	Money ($)
T15	(South Korea) K. J. Choi	73-70-74-69=286	+6	118,969
T15	(Sweden) Freddie Jacobson	72-71-68-75=286	+6	118,969
T15	(Germany) Martin Kaymer	74-71-69-72=286	+6	118,969
T15	(Australia) Adam Scott	76-70-70-70=286	+6	118,969
T15	(United States) Steve Stricker	76-68-73-69=286	+6	118,969
T15	(United States) Aaron Watkins	72-71-72-71=286	+6	118,969
T21	(United States) Blake Adams	72-70-70-75=287	+7	86,348
T21	(France) Raphaël Jacquelin	72-71-73-71=287	+7	86,348
T21	(England) Justin Rose	69-75-71-72=287	+7	86,348
T21	(United States) Jordan Spieth (a)	74-74-69-70=287	+7	0
T21	(United States) Nick Watney	69-75-73-70=287	+7	86,348
T21	(United States) Tiger Woods (c)	69-70-75-73=287	+7	86,348
T27	(Belgium) Nicolas Colsaerts	72-69-71-76=288	+8	68,943
T27	(United States) Matt Kuchar	70-73-71-74=288	+8	68,943
T29	(United States) Morgan Hoffmann	72-74-73-70=289	+9	53,168
T29	(United States) Beau Hossler (a)	70-73-70-76=289	+9	0
T29	(Sweden) Robert Karlsson	70-75-72-72=289	+9	53,168
T29	(United States) Scott Langley	76-70-70-73=289	+9	53,168
T29	(United States) Davis Love III	73-74-73-69=289	+9	53,168
T29	(Italy) Francesco Molinari	71-76-72-70=289	+9	53,168
T29	(United States) Kevin Na	74-71-71-73=289	+9	53,168
T29	(Australia) Alistair Presnell	70-74-75-70=289	+9	53,168
T29	(South Korea) Charlie Wi	74-70-71-74=289	+9	53,168
T38	(Spain) Sergio García	73-71-71-75=290	+10	44,144
T38	(United States) Hunter Mahan	72-71-73-74=290	+10	44,144
T38	(South Africa) Charl Schwartzel	73-70-74-73=290	+10	44,144
T41	(United States) Patrick Cantlay (a)	76-72-71-72=291	+11	0
T41	(Germany) Alex Čejka	78-69-70-74=291	+11	38,816
T41	(United States) Rickie Fowler	72-76-71-72=291	+11	38,816
T41	(United States) Zach Johnson	77-70-73-71=291	+11	38,816
T41	(England) Ian Poulter	70-75-73-73=291	+11	38,816
T46	(Argentina) Ángel Cabrera (c)	72-76-69-75=292	+12	31,979
T46	(United States) Bob Estes	74-73-71-74=292	+12	31,979
T46	(United States) Hunter Hamrick	77-67-71-77=292	+12	31,979
T46	(United States) Steve LeBrun	73-75-69-75=292	+12	31,979
T46	(Italy) Matteo Manassero	76-69-73-74=292	+12	31,979
T51	(England) Simon Dyson	74-74-74-71=293	+13	24,912
T51	(South Africa) Branden Grace	71-74-73-75=293	+13	24,912
T51	(Japan) Hiroyuki Fujita	75-71-73-74=293	+13	24,912
T51	(United States) Jesse Mueller	75-73-74-71=293	+13	24,912
T51	(United States) Nicholas Thompson	74-74-72-73=293	+13	24,912
T56	(United States) Michael Allen	71-73-77-73=294	+14	21,995
T56	(United States) Jonathan Byrd	71-75-71-77=294	+14	21,995
T56	(United States) Jeff Curl	73-75-71-75=294	+14	21,995
T59	(England) Matthew Baldwin	74-74-73-74=295	+15	19,955
T59	(Australia) Jason Day	75-71-76-73=295	+15	19,955
T59	(South Korea) Park Jae-bum	70-74-77-74=295	+15	19,955
T59	(United States) Darron Stiles	75-71-73-76=295	+15	19,955
T59	(United States) Kevin Streelman	76-72-72-75=295	+15	19,955
T59	(United States) Bo Van Pelt	78-70-76-71=295	+15	19,955
T65	(United States) Phil Mickelson	76-71-71-78=296	+16	18,593
T65	(Scotland) Marc Warren	73-72-74-77=296	+16	18,593
67	(South Korea) Kim Kyung-tae	74-72-74-77=297	+17	18,113
T68	(Canada) Stephen Ames	74-73-79-72=298	+18	17,633
T68	(United States) Keegan Bradley	73-73-75-77=298	+18	17,633
70	(Australia) Rod Pampling	74-73-74-78=299	+19	17,153
71	(United States) Jason Bohn	70-75-78-78=301	+21	16,833
72	(United States) Joe Ogilvie	73-75-76-79=303	+23	16,512
CUT	(Denmark) Thomas Bjørn	78-71=149	+9	
CUT	(France) Grégory Bourdy	74-75=149	+9	
CUT	(United States) Roberto Castro	75-74=149	+9	
CUT	(United States) Joe Durant	78-71=149	+9	
CUT	(United States) Robert Garrigus	72-77=149	+9	
CUT	(United States) Lucas Glover (c)	76-73=149	+9	
CUT	(United States) Bill Haas	76-73=149	+9	
CUT	(United States) Brian Harman	77-72=149	+9	
CUT	(United States) Justin Hicks	75-74=149	+9	
CUT	(United States) Charles Howell III	72-77=149	+9	
CUT	(Finland) Mikko Ilonen	75-74=149	+9	
CUT	(Japan) Ryo Ishikawa	71-78=149	+9	
CUT	(United States) Dustin Johnson	75-74=149	+9	
CUT	(Scotland) Martin Laird	77-72=149	+9	
CUT	(United States) Casey Martin	74-75=149	+9	
CUT	(South Africa) Louis Oosthuizen	77-72=149	+9	
CUT	(Sweden) Carl Pettersson	75-74=149	+9	
CUT	(United States) Alberto Sanchez (a)	72-77=149	+9	
CUT	(England) Lee Slattery	79-70=149	+9	
CUT	(United States) Bubba Watson	78-71=149	+9	
CUT	(United States) Mark Wilson	76-73=149	+9	
CUT	(South Korea) Yang Yong-eun	74-75=149	+9	
CUT	(South Korea) Bae Sang-moon	77-73=150	+10	
CUT	(Spain) Rafa Cabrera-Bello	74-76=150	+10	
CUT	(United States) Ben Crane	77-73=150	+10	
CUT	(United States) Martin Flores	71-79=150	+10	
CUT	(United States) Jim Herman	78-72=150	+10	
CUT	(United States) Edward Loar	76-74=150	+10	
CUT	(Northern Ireland) Rory McIlroy (c)	77-73=150	+10	
CUT	(Sweden) Alex Norén	75-75=150	+10	
CUT	(Australia) Geoff Ogilvy (c)	76-74=150	+10	
CUT	(United States) Scott Piercy	75-75=150	+10	
CUT	(Spain) Álvaro Quirós	75-75=150	+10	
CUT	(United States) Chez Reavie	80-70=150	+10	
CUT	(United States) Kyle Stanley	73-77=150	+10	
CUT	(United States) Olin Browne	77-74=151	+11	
CUT	(South Africa) Tim Clark	77-74=151	+11	
CUT	(England) Luke Donald	79-72=151	+11	
CUT	(Denmark) Anders Hansen	72-79=151	+11	
CUT	(United States) Tim Herron	74-77=151	+11	
CUT	(Australia) Brendan Jones	76-75=151	+11	
CUT	(Republic of Ireland) Peter Lawrie	74-77=151	+11	
CUT	(United States) Spencer Levin	74-77=151	+11	
CUT	(Japan) Toru Taniguchi	78-73=151	+11	
CUT	(United States) Gary Woodland	74-77=151	+11	
CUT	(United States) Stewart Cink	77-75=152	+12	
CUT	(United States) Paul Claxton	75-77=152	+12	
CUT	(England) Sam Osborne	76-76=152	+12	
CUT	(United States) D. A. Points	72-80=152	+12	
CUT	(Australia) Anthony Summers	76-76=152	+12	
CUT	(United States) Shane Bertsch	78-75=153	+13	
CUT	(United States) Matt Bettencourt	76-77=153	+13	
CUT	(United States) Tommy Biershenk	74-79=153	+13	
CUT	(New Zealand) Michael Campbell (c)	79-74=153	+13	
CUT	(South Africa) George Coetzee	78-75=153	+13	
CUT	(United States) James Hahn	73-80=153	+13	
CUT	(Sweden) Peter Hanson	78-75=153	+13	
CUT	(United States) Colt Knost	75-78=153	+13	
CUT	(United States) Bill Lunde	81-72=153	+13	
CUT	(United States) David Mathis	78-75=153	+13	
CUT	(England) Robert Rock	75-78=153	+13	
CUT	(Fiji) Vijay Singh	75-78=153	+13	
CUT	(Japan) Tadahiro Takayama	77-76=153	+13	
CUT	(Australia) Aaron Baddeley	75-79=154	+14	
CUT	(United States) Brooks Koepka (a)	77-77=154	+14	
CUT	(United States) Kyle Thompson	82-72=154	+14	
CUT	(United States) Cameron Wilson (a)	77-77=154	+14	
CUT	(United States) Brian Gaffney	77-78=155	+15	
CUT	(United States) Brice Garnett	78-77=155	+15	
CUT	(United States) Hunter Haas	81-74=155	+15	
CUT	(South Africa) Trevor Immelman	80-75=155	+15	
CUT	(Spain) Gonzalo Fernández-Castaño	80-76=156	+16	
CUT	(South Korea) Lee Dong-hwan	77-79=156	+16	
CUT	(United States) Tim Weinhart	78-79=157	+17	
CUT	(China) Andy Zhang (a)	79-78=157	+17	
CUT	(Spain) Miguel Ángel Jiménez	81-77=158	+18	
CUT	(United States) Nick Sherwood (a)	78-80=158	+18	
CUT	(United States) Mark McCormick	82-77=159	+19	
CUT	(United States) Scott Smith	78-81=159	+19	
CUT	(Denmark) Søren Kjeldsen	85-75=160	+20	
CUT	(United States) Steve Marino	84-78=162	+22	
CUT	(United States) Dennis Miller	80-82=162	+22	
CUT	(United States) Cole Howard	80-84=164	+24	
CUT	(United States) Brian Rowell	86-82=168	+28	

==== Scorecard ====
Final round

Hole	1	2	3	4	5	6	7	8	9	10	11	12	13	14	15	16	17	18
Par	4	4	3	4	4	4	4	3	4	4	4	4	3	4	3	5	5	4
(United States) Simpson	+3	+4	+4	+4	+5	+4	+3	+2	+2	+1	+1	+1	+1	+1	+1	+1	+1	+1
(Northern Ireland) McDowell	−1	−1	E	E	+1	+2	+2	+2	+3	+3	+2	+1	+2	+3	+3	+3	+2	+2
(United States) Thompson	+5	+5	+5	+5	+4	+4	+3	+3	+4	+4	+3	+3	+3	+3	+3	+2	+2	+2
(United States) Dufner	+3	+4	+4	+4	+4	+4	+4	+4	+4	+4	+4	+3	+4	+4	+4	+4	+3	+3
(United States) Furyk	−1	−1	−1	−1	−1	E	E	E	E	E	E	E	+1	+1	+1	+2	+2	+3
(Republic of Ireland) Harrington	+5	+6	+6	+6	+6	+7	+6	+5	+4	+4	+4	+4	+3	+3	+3	+3	+2	+3
(United States) Peterson	+4	+4	+3	+4	+4	+4	+3	+3	+3	+2	+2	+2	+2	+2	+2	+4	+3	+3
(United States) Toms	+5	+5	+5	+5	+6	+6	+5	+5	+5	+5	+5	+4	+4	+4	+4	+4	+3	+3
(South Africa) Els	+2	+2	+3	+3	+3	+3	+1	+2	+3	+3	+3	+2	+2	+2	+2	+3	+3	+4
(Sweden) Jacobson	+1	+2	+2	+2	+3	+4	+3	+3	+4	+5	+5	+5	+5	+6	+5	+6	+6	+6

Cumulative tournament scores, relative to par

Eagle	Birdie	Bogey	Double bogey
