= Alberta Classic =

Golf tournament

Tournament information
- Location: Cochrane, Alberta, Canada
- Established: 2003
- Course: The Links of Glen Eagles
- Par: 71
- Length: 7,058 yards (6,454 m)
- Tour: Nationwide Tour
- Format: Stroke play
- Prize fund: US$450,000
- Month played: September
- Final year: 2005

Tournament record score
- Aggregate: 263 Tom Carter (2003)
- To par: −17 as above

Final champion
- (United States) Peter Tomasulo
- Location in Canada Location in Alberta

The Alberta Classic was a golf tournament on the Nationwide Tour from 2003 to 2005. It was played in the Calgary, Alberta, Canada area. In 2003, it was played at The Links of Glen Eagles in Cochrane. In 2004 and 2005, it was played at the Redwood Meadows Golf and Country Club near Bragg Creek.

Tom Carter won the inaugural event in 2003, and because it was his third Nationwide Tour win of the season, he earned a promotion to the PGA Tour. Canadian David Hearn won the 2004 event. Peter Tomasulo won the third and final event in 2005.

The purse each year was US$450,000, with $81,000 going to the winner.

== Winners ==
Year	Winner	Score	To par	Margin of victory	Runner-up	Ref
Alberta Calgary Classic
2003	(United States) Tom Carter	263	−17	5 strokes	(United States) Nick Cassini	
Alberta Classic
2004	(Canada) David Hearn	273	−15	1 stroke	(Australia) David McKenzie	
2005	(United States) Peter Tomasulo	275	−9	2 strokes	(United States) Aaron Barber	
