= David Lingmerth =

Swedish professional golfer (born 1987)

Personal information
- Full name: David Thomas Lingmerth
- Nationality: Sweden
- Born: 22 July 1987 (age 39) Tranås, Sweden
- Height: 5 ft 7 in (1.70 m)
- Weight: 175 lb (79 kg; 12.5 st)
- Spouse: Megan Lingmerth

Career
- Sport: Golf
- College: University of West Florida; University of Arkansas
- Turned professional: 2010
- Current tour: PGA Tour
- Former tours: European Tour; Korn Ferry Tour
- Professional wins: 3
- Highest ranking: 35 (31 January 2016)

Number of wins by tour
- PGA Tour: 1
- Korn Ferry Tour: 2

Best results in major championships
- Masters Tournament: CUT: 2016
- PGA Championship: T12: 2015
- U.S. Open: 12th: 2016
- The Open Championship: T68: 2023

David Thomas Lingmerth (born 22 July 1987) is a Swedish professional golfer who plays on the PGA Tour.

== Early life ==
Lingmerth was born and grew up in Tranås in the province of Småland, Sweden, and is son of Thomas and Birgitta Lingmerth. He began playing golf at the local club, Tranås Golf Club, which he has represented through his career.

Lingmerth won his age level category (15) at the unofficial Swedish Youth Championship, Bankboken Cup, at Falun-Borlänge Golf Club, one stroke ahead of Henrik Norlander, who also came to be a PGA Tour player.

== Amateur career ==
In January 2008, Lingmerth won the 2007 edition of the Dixie Amateur Championship at Palm Aire Country Club in Sarasota, Florida, beating, among others, future professional world number one Brooks Koepka, who finished 11 strokes behind Lingmerth.

Lingmerth represented Sweden twice at the European Amateur Team Championship. On home soil at Österåker Golf Club in Stockholm 2010, with Henrik Norlander among Lingmerths teammates, the Swedish team earned a silver medal.

Lingmerth played college golf at the University of West Florida (one year) and the University of Arkansas (three years) where he was a two-time All-American. He won one event at West Florida and another at Arkansas.

Lingmerth's best ranking on the World Amateur Golf Ranking was 7th.

In June 2010, Lingmerth finished college and turned professional.

== Professional career ==
In the fall of 2010, Lingmerth went through all stages of the PGA Tour Qualifying school, and finished T59th to earn a place on the Nationwide Tour (later known as the Korn Ferry Tour).

Lingmerth thus played on the Nationwide Tour during the 2011 season. He had some success with two third-place finishes and five top-10s but missed out on earning his PGA Tour card by two spots on the season-ending money list, finishing 27th; the top 25 advanced to the PGA Tour. He also played the PGA Tour Qualifying school again in a move to try and earn playing privileges, but finished way down the field outside the top 100.

Lingmerth continued on the Web.com Tour in 2012 and after losing a playoff earlier in the year, he won his first title on the tour at the Neediest Kids Championship in October, finishing a stroke ahead of Casey Wittenberg. Lingmerth ended the season ranked 10th on the money list, which earned him his PGA Tour card for the 2013 season.

In only his second career start on the PGA Tour, Lingmerth finished as a joint runner-up at the Humana Challenge after losing in a three-man playoff. He shot a 10-under-par round of 62 in the final round to get into the playoff alongside Brian Gay and Charles Howell III. He was eliminated at the first extra hole after finding the water with his second shot to the par-5 18th hole. Lingmerth also led the 2013 Players Championship in the third round, finishing T2, two strokes behind Tiger Woods. He finished his rookie season in 75th place, to retain his card for 2014.

In 2014 however, he finished the season in 134th place, resulting in a visit to the Web.com Tour Finals. There he finished in 8th place, earning a return to the PGA Tour.

Lingmerth earned his first PGA Tour win at the 2015 Memorial Tournament at Muirfield Village, Ohio. Lingmerth won after beating Justin Rose on the third extra hole of a sudden death playoff.

At the 2015 Quicken Loans National, Lingmerth finished solo third with a final round 69, four shots behind the winner, Troy Merritt.

In January 2016, Lingmerth lost in a sudden-death playoff to Jason Dufner at the CareerBuilder Challenge. This was the second time that Lingmerth had lost in a playoff at the event, following his runner up finish to Brian Gay in 2013. He lost on the second extra hole after hooking his second shot into the water at the 18th and had earlier had a putt for the victory from 20 feet on the first playoff hole. Despite this, the result moved Lingmerth into the top 50 in the world rankings.

In August 2016, Lingmerth was one of two golfers representing Sweden (Henrik Stenson was the other) at the men's individual event at the 2016 Summer Olympics in Rio de Janeiro, Brazil in the first Olympic golf tournament since 1904. Lingmerth finished tied 11th, with a score 6 under par, while Stenson earned the silver medal.

In November 2016, Lingmerth represented Sweden, together with Alex Norén, at the World Cup of Golf at Kingston Heath Golf Club in Melbourne, Australia. The Swedish team finish in fifth place, one stroke from second place.

== Awards and honors ==
- In 2013, Lingmerth was elected honorary member of Tranås Golf Club, where he won the club championship in 2006, 19 years old.
- In 2013, he received Elit Sign number 141 by the Swedish Golf Federation based on world ranking achievements.
- Lingmerth was named as the Swedish Golfer of the Year, male or female, professional or amateur, for the 2015 season.

== Personal life ==
His uncle, Göran Lingmerth, has played for the Cleveland Browns of the National Football League.

== Amateur wins ==
- 2005 FSB Tour Elite Boys #4
- 2007 Dixie Amateur

== Professional wins (3) ==
=== PGA Tour wins (1) ===
| No. | Date | Tournament | Winning score | Margin of victory | Runner-up |
|---|---|---|---|---|---|
| 1 | 7 Jun 2015 | Memorial Tournament | −15 (67-65-72-69=273) | Playoff | (England) Justin Rose |

PGA Tour playoff record (1–2)

| No. | Year | Tournament | Opponent(s) | Result |
|---|---|---|---|---|
| 1 | 2013 | Humana Challenge | (United States) Brian Gay, (United States) Charles Howell III | Gay won with birdie on second extra hole Lingmerth eliminated by birdie on first hole |
| 2 | 2015 | Memorial Tournament | (England) Justin Rose | Won with par on third extra hole |
| 3 | 2016 | CareerBuilder Challenge | (United States) Jason Dufner | Lost to par on second extra hole |

=== Korn Ferry Tour wins (2) ===
Legend
Finals events (1)
Other Korn Ferry Tour (1)

| No. | Date | Tournament | Winning score | Margin of victory | Runner-up |
|---|---|---|---|---|---|
| 1 | 7 Oct 2012 | Neediest Kids Championship | −8 (66-66-74-66=272) | 1 stroke | (United States) Casey Wittenberg |
| 2 | 28 Aug 2022 | Nationwide Children's Hospital Championship | −17 (62-66-71-68=267) | 2 strokes | (United States) Paul Haley II |

Korn Ferry Tour playoff record (0–1)

| No. | Year | Tournament | Opponent | Result |
|---|---|---|---|---|
| 1 | 2012 | United Leasing Championship | (United States) Peter Tomasulo | Lost to par on fourth extra hole |

== Results in major championships ==
| Tournament | 2013 | 2014 | 2015 | 2016 | 2017 | 2018 |
|---|---|---|---|---|---|---|
| Masters Tournament | | | | CUT | | |
| U.S. Open | T17 | | | 12 | T21 | |
| The Open Championship | | | T74 | CUT | | |
| PGA Championship | CUT | | T12 | T22 | T63 | |

| Tournament | 2019 | 2020 | 2021 | 2022 | 2023 |
|---|---|---|---|---|---|
| Masters Tournament | | | | | |
| PGA Championship | | | | | CUT |
| U.S. Open | | | | T49 | |
| The Open Championship | | NT | | | T68 |

Did not play

CUT = missed the half-way cut
"T" indicates a tie for a place
NT = No tournament due to the COVID-19 pandemic

== Results in The Players Championship ==
| Tournament | 2013 | 2014 | 2015 | 2016 | 2017 | 2018 | 2019 |
|---|---|---|---|---|---|---|---|
| The Players Championship | T2 | CUT | | CUT | T72 | CUT | |

| Tournament | 2020 | 2021 | 2022 | 2023 |
|---|---|---|---|---|
| The Players Championship | C | | | T6 |

Top 10
Did not play

CUT = missed the halfway cut
"T" indicates a tie for a place
C = Cancelled after the first round due to the COVID-19 pandemic

== Results in World Golf Championships ==
| Tournament | 2015 | 2016 |
|---|---|---|
| Championship | | T49 |
| Match Play | | T51 |
| Invitational | T6 | T7 |
| Champions | T72 | |

Top 10
Did not play

"T" = Tied

== Team appearances ==
Amateur

- European Boys' Team Championship (representing Sweden): 2005
- European Youths' Team Championship (representing Sweden): 2006
- European Amateur Team Championship (representing Sweden): 2009, 2010
- Palmer Cup (representing Europe): 2010

Professional

- World Cup (representing Sweden): 2016

== See also ==
- 2012 Web.com Tour graduates
- 2014 Web.com Tour Finals graduates
- 2022 Korn Ferry Tour Finals graduates
