= 2012 Web.com Tour =

Golf tour season

2012 Web.com Tour season
- Duration: February 16, 2012 – October 28, 2012
- Number of official events: 27
- Most wins: (United States) Luke Guthrie (2) (United States) Russell Henley (2) (United States) Ben Kohles (2) (United States) Shawn Stefani (2) (United States) Casey Wittenberg (2)
- Money list: (United States) Casey Wittenberg
- Player of the Year: (United States) Casey Wittenberg

The 2012 Web.com Tour was the 23rd season of the Web.com Tour, the official development tour to the PGA Tour.

== Web.com title sponsorship ==
In June, it was announced that the tour had signed a title sponsorship agreement with Web.com, being renamed as the Web.com Tour.

== Schedule ==
The following table lists official events during the 2012 season.

Date	Tournament	Location	Purse (US$)	Winner (Note: The number in parentheses after each winner's name is the number of Web.com Tour events they had won up to and including that tournament. This information is only shown for Web.com Tour members. It is rare for someone to accumulate many wins on the Web.com Tour as success at this level usually leads to promotion to the PGA Tour.)	OWGR points	Notes
Feb 19	Pacific Rubiales Colombia Championship	Colombia	600,000	(United States) Skip Kendall (4)	14	
Mar 4	Panama Claro Championship	Panama	550,000	(United States) Edward Loar (1)	14	
Mar 11	Chile Classic	Chile	600,000	(United States) Paul Haley II (1)	14	New tournament
Mar 25	Chitimacha Louisiana Open	Louisiana	500,000	(United States) Casey Wittenberg (1)	14	
Apr 8	Soboba Golf Classic	California	750,000	(United States) Andres Gonzales (1)	14	
Apr 15	TPC Stonebrae Championship	California	600,000	(United States) Alex Aragon (1)	14	
Apr 29	South Georgia Classic	Georgia	625,000	(United States) Luke List (1)	14	
May 6	Stadion Classic at UGA	Georgia	550,000	(United States) Hudson Swafford (1)	14	
May 20	BMW Charity Pro-Am	South Carolina	600,000	(Australia) Nick Flanagan (4)	14	Pro-Am
Jun 3	Rex Hospital Open	North Carolina	550,000	(United States) James Hahn (1)	14	
Jun 10	Mexico Open	Mexico	625,000	(United States) Lee Williams (1)	14	
Jun 24	Preferred Health Systems Wichita Open	Kansas	600,000	(United States) Casey Wittenberg (2)	14	
Jul 1	United Leasing Championship	Indiana	550,000	(United States) Peter Tomasulo (3)	14	New tournament
Jul 15	Utah Championship	Utah	550,000	(United States) Doug LaBelle II (2)	14	
Jul 29	Nationwide Children's Hospital Invitational	Ohio	800,000	(United States) Ben Kohles (1)	14	
Aug 5	Cox Classic	Nebraska	650,000	(United States) Ben Kohles (2)	14	
Aug 12	Price Cutter Charity Championship	Missouri	625,000	(United States) Chris Wilson (1)	14	
Aug 19	Midwest Classic	Kansas	550,000	(United States) Shawn Stefani (1)	14	
Aug 26	News Sentinel Open	Tennessee	500,000	(United States) Darron Stiles (5)	14	
Sep 2	Mylan Classic	Pennsylvania	600,000	(United States) Robert Streb (1)	14	
Sep 16	Albertsons Boise Open	Idaho	725,000	(United States) Luke Guthrie (1)	14	
Sep 23	WNB Golf Classic	Texas	550,000	(United States) Luke Guthrie (2)	14	
Sep 30	Chiquita Classic	North Carolina	550,000	(United States) Russell Henley (2)	14	
Oct 7	Neediest Kids Championship	Maryland	600,000	(Sweden) David Lingmerth (1)	14	
Oct 14	Miccosukee Championship	Florida	600,000	(United States) Shawn Stefani (2)	14	
Oct 21	Winn-Dixie Jacksonville Open	Florida	600,000	(United States) Russell Henley (3)	14	
Oct 28	Web.com Tour Championship	Texas	1,000,000	(United States) Justin Bolli (4)	20	Tour Championship

== Location of tournaments ==
Location of tournaments of the 2012 Web.com Tour in the United States.
Regular events
Season finale
Location of tournaments of the 2012 Web.com Tour outside the United States.

== Money list ==
The money list was based on prize money won during the season, calculated in U.S. dollars. The top 25 players on the money list earned status to play on the 2013 PGA Tour.

Position	Player	Prize money ($)
1	(United States) Casey Wittenberg	433,453
2	(United States) Luke Guthrie	410,593
3	(United States) Russell Henley	400,116
4	(United States) Luke List	363,206
5	(United States) James Hahn	337,530

== Awards ==
Award	Winner	Ref.
Player of the Year (Jack Nicklaus Trophy)	(United States) Casey Wittenberg	
