= Andrew Svoboda =

American professional golfer (born 1979)

Personal information
- Nationality: United States
- Born: October 2, 1979 (age 47) New Rochelle, New York, U.S.
- Height: 5 ft 9 in (1.75 m)
- Weight: 200 lb (91 kg; 14 st)

Career
- Sport: Golf
- College: St. John's University
- Turned professional: 2004
- Former tours: PGA Tour; Web.com Tour
- Professional wins: 14

Number of wins by tour
- Korn Ferry Tour: 3
- Other: 11

Best results in major championships
- Masters Tournament: DNP
- PGA Championship: CUT: 2024
- U.S. Open: T71: 2008
- The Open Championship: DNP

Andrew Svoboda (born October 2, 1979) is an American professional golfer.

== Early life and amateur career ==
Svoboda was born in New Rochelle, New York in 1979. He played college golf at St. John's University in New York City. He won 14 college tournaments including the 2001 Big East Conference Championship.

== Professional career ==
Svoboda turned professional in 2004. He played on the Hooters Tour from 2005 to 2009, winning once. In 2009, he finished 49th at Qualifying School to earn a place on the Web.com Tour, where he played from 2010 to 2012.

Svoboda earned his 2013 PGA Tour card by finishing 21st on the Web.com Tour money list in 2012. He played on the PGA Tour in 2013, but also played a few events on the Web.com Tour as he struggled on the PGA Tour. Svoboda won the 2013 Price Cutter Charity Championship on the Web.com Tour in August. He finished 25th on the 2013 Web.com Tour regular season money list to earn his 2014 PGA Tour card. He then won the second event of the Web.com Tour Finals, the Chiquita Classic.

Svoboda played on the PGA Tour in 2014 (finishing 94th, his best year) and 2015, but returned to the Web.com Tour for 2016.

Svoboda has qualified for the U.S. Open four times with a best finish of T-71 in 2008. His best finish on the PGA Tour is T-2 at the 2014 Zurich Classic of New Orleans. Svoboda barely maintained Web.com Tour privileges for 2016, finishing 75th on the Finals money list.

After his touring career ended, Svoboda became a PGA Professional in the northeast, winning the 2023 Connecticut PGA Championship before moving to Illinois. He was one of twenty club pros to qualify for the 2024 PGA Championship after a T2 finish at the PGA Professional Championship.

== Amateur wins ==
- 2004 Metropolitan Amateur

== Professional wins (14) ==
=== Web.com Tour wins (3) ===
Legend
Finals events (1)
Other Web.com Tour (2)

No.	Date	Tournament	Winning score	Margin of victory	Runner-up
1	Aug 11, 2013	Price Cutter Charity Championship	−22 (64-72-66-64=266)	3 strokes	(Brazil) Fernando Mechereffe
2	Sep 7, 2013	Chiquita Classic	−12 (72-65-69-70=276)	Playoff	(United States) Will MacKenzie
3	Apr 3, 2016	Brasil Champions	−23 (64-65-65-67=261)	1 stroke	(United States) Bhavik Patel

Web.com Tour playoff record (1–0)

No.	Year	Tournament	Opponent	Result
1	2013	Chiquita Classic	(United States) Will MacKenzie	Won with par on first extra hole

=== Hooters Tour (1) ===
- 2009 Rock Springs Ridge Classic

=== Other wins (10) ===
- 2003 Metropolitan Open (as an amateur)
- 2007 New York State Open
- 2018 New York State Open, Long Island Open, Metropolitan Open
- 2019 Long Island Open
- 2021 Long Island Open, Metropolitan Open
- 2023 Connecticut PGA Championship
- 2026 Illinois PGA Championship

== Results in major championships ==
Tournament	2006	2007	2008	2009	2010	2011	2012	2013	2014	2015	2016	2017	2018
Masters Tournament													
U.S. Open	CUT		T71	CUT				CUT					
The Open Championship													
PGA Championship													

Tournament	2019	2020	2021	2022	2023	2024
Masters Tournament						
PGA Championship						CUT
U.S. Open					CUT	CUT
The Open Championship		NT				

Did not play

CUT = missed the half-way cut
"T" = tied
NT = no tournament due to the COVID-19 pandemic

== See also ==
- 2012 Web.com Tour graduates
- 2013 Web.com Tour Finals graduates
