= US Pro Golf Tour =

The US Pro Golf Tour was a developmental men's professional golf tour in the United States. The tour was founded by R. Thomas Kidd in 2005 and under new management, ran until early 2007, when it ran into financial difficulties.

In order to gain access to investment capital, the US Pro Golf Tour was reverse acquired by Greens Worldwide Incorporated, a publicly traded company on the OTCBB in June 2005. In 2006, several existing regional mini-tours were acquired to serve as feeders to the US Pro Golf Tour, including the New England Pro Golf Tour and the Texas-based Tight Lies Tour, and new regional tours were created in Florida and California. Plans to acquire the Tarheel Tour, based in North Carolina, fell through. A deal was also signed with Donald Trump concerning the provision of 100 US Pro Golf Tour Players to compete in the Trump Million Dollar Invitational, which had a purse of $1.6 million, which was the largest purse of any developmental tour in the United States. The event was televised world wide on ESPN. Shortly thereafter, the Tour entered into a multiyear, multi-event agreement with Donald Trump to partner with the Tour on four major tournaments on an annual basis beginning in 2007-2011.

The Tour conducted its scheduled events, even adding the Trump Million Dollar Invitational. All purses in 2005 and 2006 were paid through the conclusion of the Tour Championship in Las Vegas, NV, including an increased purse for the 2006 Tour Championship of $1 million and the addition for players of the $1.6 million purse of the Trump Million Dollar Invitational. A dispute arose between Kidd and the Board of Directors of the Tour in the fall of 2006 concerning Trump and his participation with the Tour, including a restructure of the Tour Model to less events and higher purses with Televised broadcast contracts. As a result of that dispute, Kidd resigned his positions in November 2006. Upon his resignation he warned the Board that a failure to restructure the Tour into less events with higher purses and the Trump brand would result in a failure of the Tour in 2007. After Kidd's departure, the new management attempted to go forward with its decision to proceed with their operations without restructuring by notifying Trump that they would not be proceeding with the partnership and conducting Trump events. The tour had two financial facilities in place at the time of Kidd's departure of $50 million from an institutional investor and a $5 million facility from a private equity firm. Trump gave written notice of his withdrawal from the Tour after Kidd's resignation. The Tour started its 2007 operations and conducted several tournaments but eventually were unable to execute on their model. In February 2007, under the new management, the tour declared insolvency and operations were suspended. Hundreds of players were left out of pocket having paid thousands of dollars in membership and tournament entry fees when the 2007 season was canceled, During the apparent developing financial difficulties in early 2007, Kidd offered to assist the new management in accessing the Tour's financial facilities but his overtures were ignored. Once the Tour ceased its operation, Kidd tried to gain control of the Tour to revive its operations with new funding. The Tour management ignored Kidd's efforts to revive the Tour operations for several months and further was uncooperative in transitioning the Tour to Kidd. As a result, financing facilities were withdrawn and the Tour could not be revived.

== Television coverage ==
The US Pro Golf Tour first appeared on Television in 2005 on a telecast of its first event in Atlanta, Georgia on the Golf Channel. The US Pro Golf Tour entered into a 2006 television broadcast agreement with Fox Sports for its regular Tour events in 2006 and was broadcast on ESPN worldwide with the Trump Million Dollar Invitational in 2006. During the fall of 2006, Kidd was in negotiations with ESPN for a multiyear television broadcast agreement for the Trump Major Championships that carried multi-million dollar purses over 4 events. As a result of Kidd's departure, the ESPN agreement never came to fruition, and no other US Pro Golf Tour events were ever televised.
