= James Hahn (golfer) =

American professional golfer (born 1981)

Personal information
- Nationality: United States
- Born: November 2, 1981 (age 44) Seoul, South Korea
- Height: 6 ft 1 in (1.85 m)
- Weight: 180 lb (82 kg; 13 st)
- Spouse: Stephanie Hahn
- Children: Kailee

Career
- Sport: Golf
- College: University of California, Berkeley
- Turned professional: 2003
- Current tour: PGA Tour
- Former tours: Canadian Tour; Korean Tour; Web.com Tour
- Professional wins: 5
- Highest ranking: 52 (May 22, 2016)

Number of wins by tour
- PGA Tour: 2
- Korn Ferry Tour: 1
- Other: 2

Best results in major championships
- Masters Tournament: T48: 2017
- PGA Championship: T13: 2017
- U.S. Open: T49: 2016
- The Open Championship: T68: 2016

- James Hahn
- Hangul: 한재웅
- RR: Han Jaeung
- MR: Han Chaeung

James Hahn (born November 2, 1981) is an American professional golfer who plays on the PGA Tour.

== Early life and amateur career ==
Born in Seoul, South Korea, Hahn was raised in Alameda, California. He played college golf at the University of California in nearby Berkeley and turned professional after graduating in 2003.

== Professional career ==
He played on the Canadian Tour, Korean Tour and Gateway Tour before he joined the Nationwide Tour in 2010. He finished 29th on the Tour's money list in his rookie season after recording five top-10 finishes. On June 4, 2012, he picked up his first win on Tour in 2012 at the Rex Hospital Open after defeating Scott Parel in a playoff – going for the green in two on the decisive par 5 because he had a flight to catch. He then proceeded to board a plane to California to play in sectional qualifying for the U.S. Open the following day. Hahn won the event and played in his first major at the 2012 U.S. Open.

In February 2015, Hahn won for the first time on the PGA Tour at the Northern Trust Open played at Riviera Country Club. He beat Paul Casey and Dustin Johnson in a sudden-death playoff after all three players finished in a tie at six-under-par after regulation play. After Casey had been eliminated on the second extra hole, Hahn holed a 25-foot birdie putt on the third extra hole to edge out Johnson for the victory. The win moved Hahn into the top 100 in the world for the first time and earned him entry into the 2015 Masters Tournament.

Hahn missed the cut for the 2015 Masters tournament by one stroke, after calling an unnoticed one stroke penalty on himself.

In May 2016, after missing the cut in his eight previous starts, Hahn won for the second time on the PGA Tour at the Wells Fargo Championship after beating Roberto Castro in a play-off. Hahn moved up to a career best 55th in the OWGR.

Hahn lost in a sudden-death playoff at the Sony Open in Hawaii in January 2018 to Patton Kizzire. Hahn fired a final round of 62 to force a playoff with Kizzire. The playoff went to the sixth extra hole, where Hahn missed an eight-foot par putt to extend the playoff, resulting in victory for Kizzire. Previously, Hahn had missed two birdie putts during the playoff that would have seen him win the tournament.

== Professional wins (5) ==
=== PGA Tour wins (2) ===
| No. | Date | Tournament | Winning score | To par | Margin of victory | Runner(s)-up |
|---|---|---|---|---|---|---|
| 1 | Feb 22, 2015 | Northern Trust Open | 66-74-69-69=278 | −6 | Playoff | (England) Paul Casey, (United States) Dustin Johnson |
| 2 | May 8, 2016 | Wells Fargo Championship | 70-71-68-70=279 | −9 | Playoff | (United States) Roberto Castro |

PGA Tour playoff record (2–1)

| No. | Year | Tournament | Opponent(s) | Result |
|---|---|---|---|---|
| 1 | 2015 | Northern Trust Open | (England) Paul Casey, (United States) Dustin Johnson | Won with birdie on third extra hole Casey eliminated by birdie on second hole |
| 2 | 2016 | Wells Fargo Championship | (United States) Roberto Castro | Won with par on first extra hole |
| 3 | 2018 | Sony Open in Hawaii | (United States) Patton Kizzire | Lost to par on sixth extra hole |

=== Web.com Tour wins (1) ===
| No. | Date | Tournament | Winning score | To par | Margin of victory | Runner-up |
|---|---|---|---|---|---|---|
| 1 | Jun 3, 2012 | Rex Hospital Open | 67-68-69-67=271 | −13 | Playoff | (United States) Scott Parel |

Web.com Tour playoff record (1–0)

| No. | Year | Tournament | Opponent | Result |
|---|---|---|---|---|
| 1 | 2012 | Rex Hospital Open | (United States) Scott Parel | Won with birdie on second extra hole |

=== Canadian Tour wins (2) ===
| No. | Date | Tournament | Winning score | To par | Margin of victory | Runner-up |
|---|---|---|---|---|---|---|
| 1 | Jul 5, 2009 | Telus Edmonton Open | 68-71-67-66=272 | −16 | Playoff | (Canada) Jim Rutledge |
| 2 | Oct 4, 2009 | Riviera Nayarit Classic | 72-64-65-68=269 | −19 | 3 strokes | (Colombia) Eduardo Herrera |

== Results in major championships ==
| Tournament | 2012 | 2013 | 2014 | 2015 | 2016 | 2017 | 2018 |
|---|---|---|---|---|---|---|---|
| Masters Tournament | | | | CUT | | T48 | |
| U.S. Open | CUT | | | | T49 | | |
| The Open Championship | | | | CUT | T68 | T74 | |
| PGA Championship | | | | CUT | T70 | T13 | CUT |

| Tournament | 2019 | 2020 | 2021 | 2022 | 2023 | 2024 | 2025 |
|---|---|---|---|---|---|---|---|
| Masters Tournament | | | | | | | |
| PGA Championship | | | | | | | |
| U.S. Open | | | | | | | CUT |
| The Open Championship | | | | | | | |

Did not play

CUT = missed the half-way cut
"T" indicates a tie for a place

=== Summary ===
| Tournament | Wins | 2nd | 3rd | Top-5 | Top-10 | Top-25 | Events | Cuts made |
|---|---|---|---|---|---|---|---|---|
| Masters Tournament | 0 | 0 | 0 | 0 | 0 | 0 | 2 | 1 |
| U.S. Open | 0 | 0 | 0 | 0 | 0 | 0 | 2 | 1 |
| The Open Championship | 0 | 0 | 0 | 0 | 0 | 0 | 4 | 2 |
| PGA Championship | 0 | 0 | 0 | 0 | 0 | 1 | 4 | 2 |
| Totals | 0 | 0 | 0 | 0 | 0 | 1 | 12 | 6 |

- Most consecutive cuts made – 6 (2016 U.S. Open – 2017 PGA)
- Longest streak of top-10s – 0

== Results in The Players Championship ==
| Tournament | 2013 | 2014 | 2015 | 2016 | 2017 | 2018 | 2019 | 2020 | 2021 | 2022 | 2023 |
|---|---|---|---|---|---|---|---|---|---|---|---|
| The Players Championship | T62 | CUT | T30 | T43 | CUT | CUT | | C | T41 | CUT | CUT |

Did not play

CUT = missed the halfway cut
"T" indicates a tie for a place
C = Canceled after the first round due to the COVID-19 pandemic

== Results in World Golf Championships ==
| Tournament | 2015 | 2016 | 2017 | 2018 |
|---|---|---|---|---|
| Championship | | | | |
| Match Play | | | | T36 |
| Invitational | T42 | 41 | | |
| Champions | | | | |

Did not play

QF, R16, R32, R64 = Round in which player lost in match play
"T" = Tied

== See also ==
- 2012 Web.com Tour graduates
