= Doug LaBelle II =

American golfer (born 1975)

Personal information
- Full name: Douglas Norman LaBelle II
- Nationality: United States
- Born: January 19, 1975 (age 51) Mount Pleasant, Michigan, U.S.
- Height: 5 ft 10 in (1.78 m)
- Weight: 165 lb (75 kg; 11.8 st)

Career
- Sport: Golf
- College: University of New Mexico
- Turned professional: 1998
- Former tours: Canadian Tour; PGA Tour of Australasia; Web.com Tour; PGA Tour
- Professional wins: 2

Number of wins by tour
- Korn Ferry Tour: 2

Best results in major championships
- Masters Tournament: DNP
- PGA Championship: DNP
- U.S. Open: CUT: 2003, 2013
- The Open Championship: T51: 2008

Douglas Norman LaBelle II (born January 19, 1975) is an American professional golfer.

== Career ==
LaBelle played on the PGA Tour's developmental tour from 2003–06 and 2009–12. He has also played on the Canadian Tour from 1999 to 2002 and the PGA Tour of Australasia from 2000 to 2002. He qualified for the 2007 PGA Tour season by finishing 15th on the Nationwide Tour money list in 2006. He played on the PGA Tour in 2007, 2008, 2013, and 2014.

== Professional wins (2) ==
=== Web.com Tour wins (2) ===
No.	Date	Tournament	Winning score	Margin of victory	Runner(s)-up
1	Jul 23, 2006	Price Cutter Charity Championship	−27 (63-67-67-64=261)	2 strokes	(Australia) Nick Flanagan
2	Jul 15, 2012	Utah Championship	−15 (64-68-69-68=269)	1 stroke	(United States) Scott Gutschewski, (United States) James Hahn, (United States) Michael Putnam, (United States) Sam Saunders

== Results in major championships ==
Tournament	2003	2004	2005	2006	2007	2008	2009	2010	2011	2012	2013
U.S. Open	CUT										CUT
The Open Championship						T51					

Did not play

CUT = missed the half-way cut
"T" = tied
Note: LaBelle never played in the Masters Tournament or the PGA Championship.

== Results in The Players Championship ==
Tournament	2007
The Players Championship	CUT

CUT = missed the half-way cut

== U.S. national team appearances ==
Amateur

- Palmer Cup: 1998 (tie)

== See also ==
- 2006 Nationwide Tour graduates
- 2012 Web.com Tour graduates
