= Casey Wittenberg =

American professional golfer (born 1984)

Personal information
- Nationality: United States
- Born: November 30, 1984 (age 41) Memphis, Tennessee, U.S.
- Height: 5 ft 8 in (1.73 m)
- Weight: 158 lb (72 kg; 11.3 st)

Career
- Sport: Golf
- College: Oklahoma State University
- Turned professional: 2004
- Former tours: PGA Tour; Korn Ferry Tour
- Professional wins: 6

Number of wins by tour
- Korn Ferry Tour: 3
- Other: 3

Best results in major championships
- Masters Tournament: T13: 2004
- PGA Championship: DNP
- U.S. Open: T10: 2012
- The Open Championship: DNP

Achievements and awards
- Web.com Tour money list winner: 2012
- Web.com Tour Player of the Year: 2012

Casey Wittenberg (born November 30, 1984) is an American professional golfer who had a successful amateur career.

== Early life and amateur career ==
Wittenberg was born in Memphis, Tennessee. He played collegiately at Oklahoma State University. He lost to Nick Flanagan in the finals of the 2003 U.S. Amateur.

== Professional career ==
In 2004, he finished 13th at the Masters Tournament, the lowest amateur finish in 41 years. He was the only player in the field to improve his score each round. Additionally, he registered the lowest Sunday back 9 score (31) of any amateur in Masters history.

At the 2004 U.S. Open at Shinnecock Hills, he shot a four-round total of 296, which was the second best of any amateur in the tournament that year.

Wittenberg turned professional in 2004 and played on the PGA Tour, Web.com Tour (formerly Nationwide Tour), and mini-tours since. In 2012, Wittenberg won his first title on a major golf tour, the Nationwide Tour's Chitimacha Louisiana Open. He followed it up three months later with his second win of the season at the Preferred Health Systems Wichita Open, one week after finishing T10 at the U.S. Open.

Wittenberg was the leading money winner on the Web.com Tour in 2012, earning his 2013 PGA Tour card, and was named Web.com Tour Player of the Year. In 2013, he made only eight cut in 27 tournaments and finished 150th on the money list and 164th on the FedEx Cup points list, resulting in the loss of his PGA Tour card.

Wittenberg returned to the Web.com Tour in 2014 and has played there since. He won again in 2017 at the Chitimacha Louisiana Open, but he finished the regular season points in 41st and once again failed to earn his PGA Tour card.

== Amateur wins (4) ==
this list may be incomplete

- 2001 Azalea Invitational
- 2003 Southern Amateur, Porter Cup, Terra Cotta Invitational

== Professional wins (6) ==
=== Web.com Tour wins (3) ===
No.	Date	Tournament	Winning score	Margin of victory	Runner(s)-up
1	Mar 25, 2012	Chitimacha Louisiana Open	−24 (66-66-63-65=260)	8 strokes	(United States) Paul Claxton, (Argentina) Fabián Gómez, (United States) Chris Riley
2	Jun 24, 2012	Preferred Health Systems Wichita Open	−18 (63-70-67-66=266)	2 strokes	(United States) Jim Herman, (United States) Justin Hicks
3	Mar 26, 2017	Chitimacha Louisiana Open (2)	−21 (65-64-65-69=263)	3 strokes	(China) Zhang Xinjun

Web.com Tour playoff record (0–1)

No.	Year	Tournament	Opponent	Result
1	2008	Ford Wayne Gretzky Classic	(United States) Justin Hicks	Lost to par on first extra hole

=== NGA Hooters Tour wins (3) ===
No.	Date	Tournament	Winning score	Margin of victory	Runner(s)-up
1	Aug 13, 2006	Pearl River Resort Golf Classic	−18 (69-67-67-67=270)	1 stroke	(United States) Chris Stroud
2	Aug 19, 2007	Flora Bama Lounge Classic	−17 (65-66-69-71=271)	1 stroke	(United States) Jeremy Wilkinson
3	Sep 16, 2007	Kandy Waters Memorial Classic	−13 (69-69-70-67=275)	4 strokes	(United States) Michael Lavery, (Zimbabwe) Bruce McDonald, (United States) Shawn Stefani, (United States) Kevin Streelman

== Results in major championships ==
Tournament	2004	2005	2006	2007	2008	2009	2010	2011	2012	2013	2014
Masters Tournament	T13LA	T33									
U.S. Open	T36	CUT			CUT	CUT			T10	CUT	CUT
The Open Championship											
PGA Championship											

Top 10
Did not play

LA = Low amateur
CUT = missed the half-way cut
"T" indicates a tie for a place

== Results in The Players Championship ==
Tournament	2013
The Players Championship	T8

Top 10

"T" indicates a tie for a place

== U.S. national team appearances ==
Amateur

- Junior Ryder Cup: 2002
- Walker Cup: 2003

== See also ==
- 2008 Nationwide Tour graduates
- 2012 Web.com Tour graduates
