= Luke Guthrie =

American professional golfer (born 1990)

Personal information
- Nationality: United States
- Born: January 31, 1990 (age 36) Quincy, Illinois, U.S.
- Height: 6 ft 0 in (1.83 m)
- Weight: 175 lb (79 kg; 12.5 st)
- Spouse: Kaitlyn Guthrie (m. 2016)

Career
- Sport: Golf
- College: University of Illinois
- Turned professional: 2012
- Current tour: Korn Ferry Tour
- Former tour: PGA Tour
- Professional wins: 2
- Highest ranking: 58 (March 24, 2013)

Number of wins by tour
- Korn Ferry Tour: 2

Best results in major championships
- Masters Tournament: DNP
- PGA Championship: T47: 2013
- U.S. Open: CUT: 2013, 2014, 2019
- The Open Championship: CUT: 2013

Luke Guthrie (born January 31, 1990) is an American professional golfer.

== Early life and amateur career ==
In 1990, Guthrie was born in Quincy, Illinois. He played college golf at the University of Illinois Urbana-Champaign. In his time at the university, Guthrie won seven collegiate tournaments, including two Big Ten Conference Championships.

== Professional career ==
In 2012, upon his completion of his senior season at University of Illinois, Guthrie turned professional and began playing on the Web.com Tour while still taking university courses. In his first five professional golf outings, Guthrie secured four top-10 finishes. In his sixth appearance, Luke won the Albertsons Boise Open. Guthrie followed that victory with a second tournament win, just weeks later at the WNB Golf Classic. He also played three events on the PGA Tour in 2012, finishing in the top-20 in each. Guthrie's best finish was a tie for fifth place at the John Deere Classic.

== Professional wins (2) ==
=== Web.com Tour wins (2) ===
No.	Date	Tournament	Winning score	Margin of victory	Runners-up
1	Sep 16, 2012	Albertsons Boise Open	−22 (64-71-62-66=262)	4 strokes	(Australia) Scott Gardiner, (United States) Richard H. Lee, (United States) Michael Putnam, (United States) Steve Wheatcroft
2	Sep 23, 2012	WNB Golf Classic	−17 (72-66-67-66=271)	1 stroke	(New Zealand) Danny Lee, (Australia) Cameron Percy

Web.com Tour playoff record (0–1)

No.	Year	Tournament	Opponent	Result
1	2012	Nationwide Children's Hospital Invitational	(United States) Ben Kohles	Lost to birdie on first extra hole

== Results in major championships ==
Tournament	2013	2014	2015	2016	2017	2018
Masters Tournament						
U.S. Open	CUT	CUT				
The Open Championship	CUT					
PGA Championship	T47					

Tournament	2019
Masters Tournament	
PGA Championship	
U.S. Open	CUT
The Open Championship	

Did not play

CUT = missed the half-way cut
"T" = tied

== U.S. national team appearances ==
Amateur

- Junior Ryder Cup: 2004

== See also ==
- 2012 Web.com Tour graduates
