= Matt Weibring =

American professional golfer

Personal information
- Full name: Matthew Kirk Weibring
- Nationality: United States
- Born: December 4, 1979 (age 46) Dallas, Texas, U.S.
- Height: 6 ft 1 in (1.85 m)
- Weight: 165 lb (75 kg; 11.8 st)

Career
- Sport: Golf
- College: Georgia Tech
- Turned professional: 2002
- Former tours: PGA Tour; Web.com Tour; Canadian Tour

Best results in major championships
- Masters Tournament: DNP
- PGA Championship: DNP
- U.S. Open: T62: 2013
- The Open Championship: DNP

Matthew Kirk Weibring (born December 4, 1979) is an American professional golfer.

== Early life ==
Weibring was born December 4, 1979. He is the son of D. A. Weibring.

== Professional life ==
In 2002, Weibring turned professional. He played on the second tier Nationwide Tour for several years. He also played on the Canadian Tour some during this era. In 2008, he finished 24th place on the 2008 Nationwide Tour money list earning a spot on the PGA Tour.

He played on the PGA Tour in 2009–10. Weibring's best result on the PGA Tour is T-8 at the 2009 Verizon Heritage. In 2011, he returned to the Nationwide Tour.

Weibring has a history of injuries, include hip and knee surgery.

== Personal life ==
Weibring has Bell's palsy, a condition his father overcame during his career, and cannot blink his right eye.

== See also ==
- 2008 Nationwide Tour graduates
