= John Peterson (golfer) =

American professional golfer (born 1989)

Personal information
- Full name: John Herring Peterson
- Nationality: United States
- Born: April 18, 1989 (age 37) Fort Worth, Texas, U.S.
- Height: 5 ft 11 in (1.80 m)
- Weight: 165 lb (75 kg; 11.8 st)

Career
- Sport: Golf
- College: Louisiana State University
- Turned professional: 2011
- Former tours: PGA Tour; Web.com Tour
- Professional wins: 1

Best results in major championships
- Masters Tournament: 60th: 2013
- PGA Championship: DNP
- U.S. Open: T4: 2012
- The Open Championship: DNP

Achievements and awards
- Web.com Tour Finals money list winner: 2013

John Herring Peterson (born April 18, 1989) is an American professional golfer.

== Early life and amateur career ==
Peterson was born in Fort Worth, Texas. He played college golf at Louisiana State University. At LSU, he was a three-time All-American and won twice, including the 2011 NCAA Division I Championship.

== Professional career ==
In 2011, Peterson turned professional. He played in two Nationwide Tour events: The Nationwide Children's Hospital Invitational (T2) and the Children's Hospital Classic (T23) and a number of PGA Tour events through sponsor exemptions.

Peterson qualified for the 2012 U.S. Open through sectional qualifying. In the third round, he was paired with his mentor and fellow LSU alum David Toms, and Peterson also got a hole in one at the par 3 13th hole. He finished the tournament tied for fourth, which earned him exemptions to the 2013 Masters Tournament and U.S. Open.

In 2013, Peterson became the first active Web.com Tour member to compete in the Masters. He earned conditional Web.com Tour status for 2013 based on his 2012 PGA Tour non-member earnings ($327,091), which was equivalent to 172nd on the 2012 PGA Tour money list. He played in the Web.com Tour Finals and finished first to earn a fully exempt PGA Tour card for 2014. He finished seventh in the Web.com Tour Finals to earn his PGA Tour card for the 2014–15 season.

After not regaining his PGA Tour card through the 2018 Web.com Tour Finals, Peterson retired from professional golf. However, he announced his return to golf on April 25, 2019, after watching Tiger Woods and Patrick Cantlay at the Masters.

== Amateur wins ==
- 2011 NCAA Division I Championship, Jones Cup Invitational

== Professional wins (1) ==
=== Adams Tour wins (1) ===
- 2012 Coca-Cola Walmart Open

== Results in major championships ==
Tournament	2012	2013
Masters Tournament		60
U.S. Open	T4	T67
The Open Championship		
PGA Championship		

Top 10
Did not play

CUT = missed the half-way cut
"T" indicates a tie for a place

== Results in The Players Championship ==
Tournament	2014
The Players Championship	T59

"T" indicates a tie for a place

== See also ==
- 2013 Web.com Tour Finals graduates
- 2014 Web.com Tour Finals graduates
