= Russell Henley =

American professional golfer (born 1989)

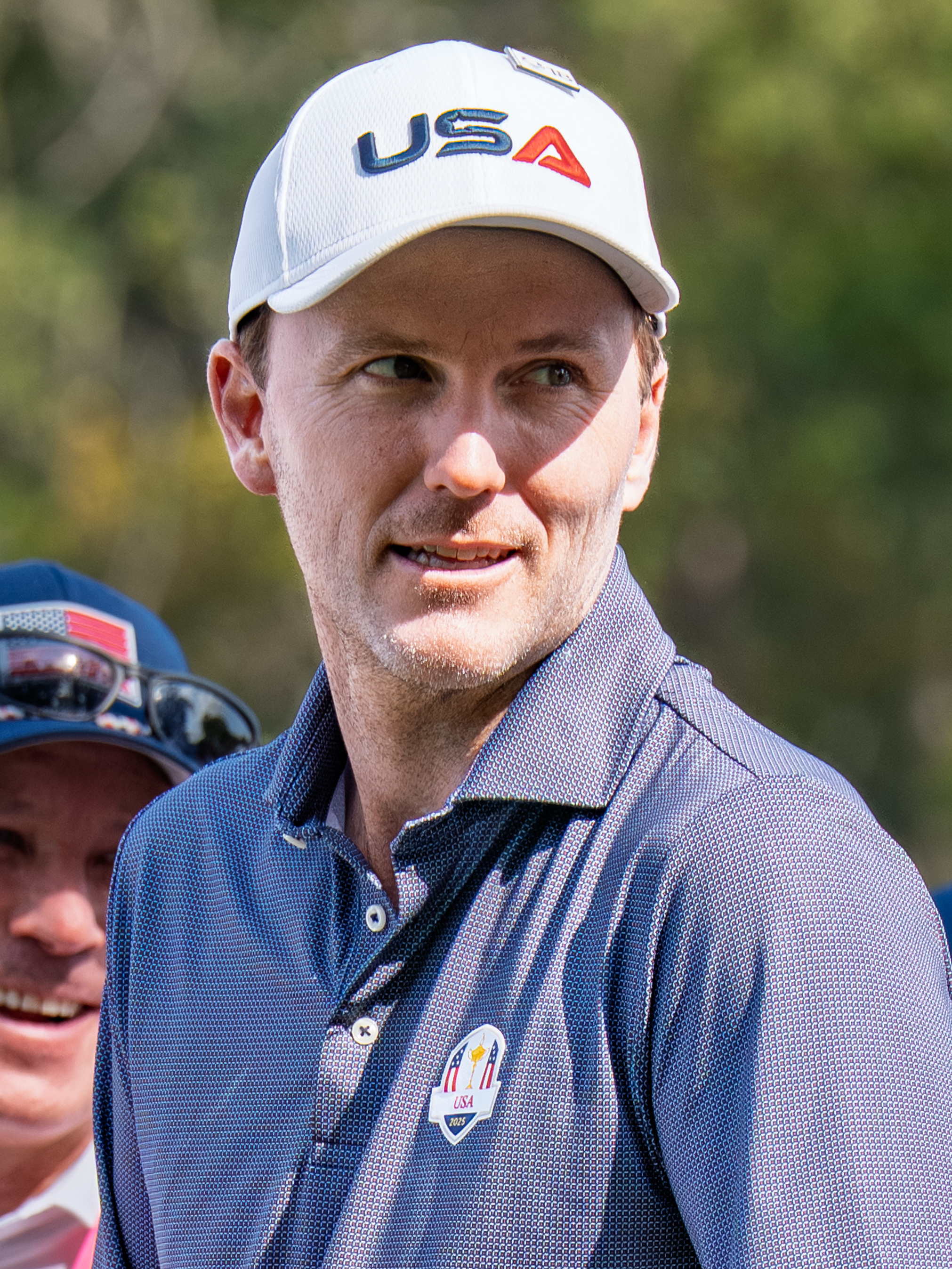
- Henley at the 2025 Ryder Cup

Personal information
- Full name: Russell Chapin Henley
- Nationality: United States
- Born: April 12, 1989 (age 37) Macon, Georgia, U.S.
- Height: 6 ft 0 in (1.83 m)
- Weight: 180 lb (82 kg; 13 st)
- Spouse: Teil Duncan
- Children: 3

Career
- Sport: Golf
- College: University of Georgia
- Turned professional: 2011
- Current tour: PGA Tour
- Former tour: Web.com Tour
- Professional wins: 9
- Highest ranking: 3 (September 21, 2025) (as of October 25, 2026)

Number of wins by tour
- PGA Tour: 6
- Korn Ferry Tour: 3

Best results in major championships
- Masters Tournament: T3: 2026
- PGA Championship: T12: 2015
- U.S. Open: T7: 2024
- The Open Championship: 5th: 2024

Achievements and awards
- Haskins Award: 2010

Russell Chapin Henley (born April 12, 1989) is an American professional golfer who plays on the PGA Tour, where he has won six titles.

== Early life and amateur career ==
Born in Macon, Georgia, on April 12, 1989, Henley attended Stratford Academy in Macon. He played college golf for four years at the University of Georgia in Athens. He won the 2010 Haskins Award as the most outstanding collegiate golfer and played in the U.S. Open and tied for the low amateur (with Scott Langley). He also played in two Nationwide Tour events in 2010: the Nationwide Children's Hospital Invitational and the Stadion Athens Classic at UGA.

In 2011, Henley won the Stadion Classic at UGA on the Nationwide Tour, only the second amateur to win on that tour. The tournament was played on the University of Georgia's home course. Henley represented the U.S. that year at the Walker Cup and Palmer Cup competitions.

== Professional career ==
Henley made his professional debut at the Nationwide Tour's Soboba Golf Classic in September 2011. A year later, he won the Chiquita Classic, defeating Patrick Cantlay and Morgan Hoffmann in a playoff. In October 2012, he won his second title of the year at the Winn-Dixie Jacksonville Open. On the 72nd hole, he made 25 ft (7.6 m) putt for birdie to force playoff against B.J. Staten. He made par on the first playoff hole to earn the win. He graduated from the Web.com Tour (formerly the Nationwide Tour), to the PGA Tour, by finishing third on the money list in 2012.

=== PGA Tour ===
Henley became the first PGA Tour rookie to win his debut in 12 years with a record-setting performance at the Sony Open in Hawaii in January 2013. He finished at 256 (–24), breaking the Sony Open scoring record by four shots. It was the second-lowest score for a 72-hole tournament in PGA Tour history, two shots behind Tommy Armour III at the Valero Texas Open in 2003. The win gave Henley an invitation to the Masters and the PGA Championship.

Henley won his second PGA Tour title at the Honda Classic in Florida in March 2014. In difficult conditions on Sunday, Henley shot a two-over-par round of 72 to make it into a four-man playoff with Russell Knox, Rory McIlroy, and Ryan Palmer. At the first playoff hole, the par-five 18th, Henley was the only one of the four players to find the green in two. Knox, McIlroy and Palmer all failed to get down in two, leaving Henley to hole from three feet for victory. He climbed into the world's top 50 as a result of this win and qualified for the upcoming Masters.

In April 2017, Henley won his third tour event at the Shell Houston Open in Texas. He started the round four strokes behind 54-hole leader Kang Sung-hoon. Henley shot a final round 65 (−7), which included ten birdies and a double-bogey (ninth hole), to win by three shots over runner-up Kang. With the win, he secured the final spot in the next week's Masters and also a spot into the PGA Championship in August. At the 2021 U.S. Open, Henley held a share of the lead after the first, second, and third rounds. However, he faltered in the final round and shot a 5-over par 76 to finish in a tie for 13th.

Henley won the 2022 World Wide Technology Championship at Mayakoba for his first PGA Tour win in five years. He won by four shots ahead of Brian Harman, hitting a record-equalling score of 23-under par.

At the 2023 Masters Tournament, Henley finished tied for fourth after a final round 70. This is his best finish in a major.

In March 2025, Henley won the Arnold Palmer Invitational by one stroke over Collin Morikawa. Henley trailed Morikawa by three shots with five holes to play, but Henley made birdie on the 14th hole while Morikawa made bogey. Then on the par-5 16th hole, Henley chipped in for eagle while Morikawa made par.

In May 2026, Henley won the Charles Schwab Challenge for his sixth PGA Tour victory. Henley birdied the final four holes, including the first hole in a sudden death playoff, to defeat Eric Cole.

== Professional wins (9) ==
=== PGA Tour wins (6) ===
Legend
Signature events (1)
Other PGA Tour (5)

No.	Date	Tournament	Winning score	To par	Margin of victory	Runner(s)-up
1	Jan 13, 2013	Sony Open in Hawaii	63-63-67-63=256	−24	3 strokes	(South Africa) Tim Clark
2	Mar 2, 2014	The Honda Classic	64-68-68-72=272	−8	Playoff	(Scotland) Russell Knox, (Northern Ireland) Rory McIlroy, (United States) Ryan Palmer
3	Apr 2, 2017	Shell Houston Open	67-67-69-65=268	−20	3 strokes	(South Korea) Kang Sung-hoon
4	Nov 6, 2022	World Wide Technology Championship	63-63-65-70=261	−23	4 strokes	(United States) Brian Harman
5	Mar 9, 2025	Arnold Palmer Invitational	72-68-67-70=277	−11	1 stroke	(United States) Collin Morikawa
6	May 31, 2026	Charles Schwab Challenge	66-66-69-67=268	−12	Playoff	(United States) Eric Cole

PGA Tour playoff record (2–1)

No.	Year	Tournament	Opponent(s)	Result
1	2014	The Honda Classic	(Scotland) Russell Knox, (Northern Ireland) Rory McIlroy, (United States) Ryan Palmer	Won with birdie on first extra hole
2	2022	Sony Open in Hawaii	(Japan) Hideki Matsuyama	Lost to eagle on first extra hole
3	2026	Charles Schwab Challenge	(United States) Eric Cole	Won with birdie on first extra hole

=== Web.com Tour wins (3) ===
No.	Date	Tournament	Winning score	To par	Margin of victory	Runner(s)-up
1	May 8, 2011	Stadion Classic at UGA (as an amateur)	72-66-66-68=272	−12	2 strokes	(United States) Troy Kelly
2	Sep 30, 2012	Chiquita Classic	66-65-65-70=266	−22	Playoff	(United States) Patrick Cantlay, (United States) Morgan Hoffmann
3	Oct 21, 2012	Winn-Dixie Jacksonville Open	66-70-69-65=270	−10	Playoff	(United States) B. J. Staten

Web.com Tour playoff record (2–0)

No.	Year	Tournament	Opponent(s)	Result
1	2012	Chiquita Classic	(United States) Patrick Cantlay, (United States) Morgan Hoffmann	Won with par on first extra hole
2	2012	Winn-Dixie Jacksonville Open	(United States) B. J. Staten	Won with par on first extra hole

== Results in major championships ==
Results not in chronological order in 2020.

Tournament	2010	2011	2012	2013	2014	2015	2016	2017	2018
Masters Tournament				CUT	T31	21		T11	T15
U.S. Open	T16_{LA}	T42		CUT	T60	CUT		T27	T25
The Open Championship				T73	CUT	T20	CUT	T37	CUT
PGA Championship				CUT	CUT	T12	T22	T71	T50

Tournament	2019	2020	2021	2022	2023	2024	2025	2026
Masters Tournament				T30	T4	T38	CUT	T3
PGA Championship		T37	T71	T60	CUT	T23	CUT	CUT
U.S. Open			T13	CUT	T14	T7	T10	T65
The Open Championship		NT	CUT	T62	CUT	5	T10	T9

Top 10
Did not play

LA = low amateur
CUT = missed the half-way cut
"T" indicates a tie for a place
NT = no tournament due to COVID-19 pandemic

=== Summary ===
Tournament	Wins	2nd	3rd	Top-5	Top-10	Top-25	Events	Cuts made
Masters Tournament	0	0	1	2	2	5	10	8
PGA Championship	0	0	0	0	0	3	13	8
U.S. Open	0	0	0	0	2	6	13	10
The Open Championship	0	0	0	1	3	4	12	7
Totals	0	0	1	3	7	18	48	33

- Most consecutive cuts made – 7 (2016 PGA – 2018 U.S. Open)
- Longest streak of top-10s – 3 (2025 U.S. Open - 2026 Masters)

== Results in The Players Championship ==
Tournament	2013	2014	2015	2016	2017	2018	2019
The Players Championship	CUT	T17	T24	CUT	T35	CUT	CUT

Tournament	2020	2021	2022	2023	2024	2025	2026
The Players Championship	C	CUT	T13	T19	CUT	T30	T13

CUT = missed the halfway cut
"T" indicates a tie for a place
C = canceled after the first round due to the COVID-19 pandemic

== Results in World Golf Championships ==
Results not in chronological order before 2015.

Tournament	2013	2014	2015	2016	2017	2018	2019	2020	2021	2022	2023
Championship	T28	T47	T56			T58					
Match Play	R32		T34			T36		NT^{1}	T28	T60	T17
Invitational	T27	T41	T17		T66						
Champions		T35			T36			NT^{1}	NT^{1}	NT^{1}	

^{1}Canceled due to COVID-19 pandemic

Did not play

QF, R16, R32, R64 = Round in which player lost in match play
"T" = Tied
NT = No tournament
Note that the Championship and Invitational were discontinued from 2022. The Champions was discontinued from 2023.

== PGA Tour career summary ==
Season	Starts	Cuts made	Wins	2nd	3rd	Top-10	Top-25	Earnings ($)	Money list rank
2010	1	1	0	0	0	0	1	n/a^{[a]}	n/a
2011	1	1	0	0	0	0	0	n/a^{[a]}	n/a
2013	24	17	1	0	0	3	5	2,008,026	33
2013–14	29	17	1	1	0	3	5	2,590,493	31
2014–15	24	20	0	0	1	4	11	2,110,774	39
2015–16	25	13	0	0	0	4	7	1,228,347	85
2016–17	27	22	1	0	1	5	11	3,413,876	20
2017–18	23	16	0	0	0	3	8	1,516,438	70
2018–19	25	13	0	1	0	1	5	1,133,773	93
2019–20	20	13	0	0	0	4	6	1,195,378	73
2020–21	25	19	0	0	2	5	9	2,545,330	56
2021–22	22	19	0	1	0	4	10	2,837,505	45
2022–23	25	19	1	1	0	5	14	6,332,282	25
2024	19	18	0	0	0	7	11	5,080,969	21
2025	19	17	1	2	0	10	13	14,707,570	4
2026*	12	9	1	0	1	4	8	4,761,817	13
Career*	321	234	6	6	5	62	124	$51,462,577	17

^{a} Henley was an amateur.

* As of June 1, 2026

== U.S. national team appearances ==
Amateur

- Palmer Cup: 2010 (winners), 2011 (winners)
- Walker Cup: 2011

Professional

- Ryder Cup: 2025
- Presidents Cup: 2024 (winners), 2026 (winners)

== See also ==
- 2012 Web.com Tour graduates
