= Edward Loar =

American professional golfer (born 1977)

Personal information
- Full name: James Edward Loar III
- Nationality: United States
- Born: November 15, 1977 (age 48) Dallas, Texas, U.S.
- Height: 6 ft 4 in (1.93 m)
- Weight: 215 lb (98 kg; 15.4 st)

Career
- Sport: Golf
- College: Oklahoma State University
- Turned professional: 2000
- Former tours: PGA Tour; Asian Tour; Korn Ferry Tour; Gateway Tour
- Professional wins: 12

Number of wins by tour
- Asian Tour: 2
- Korn Ferry Tour: 2
- Other: 8

Best results in major championships
- Masters Tournament: DNP
- PGA Championship: DNP
- U.S. Open: T32: 2013
- The Open Championship: DNP

James Edward Loar III (born November 15, 1977) is an American professional golfer.

== Early life and amateur career ==
In 1977, Loar was born in Dallas, Texas. He is a left-handed golfer.

Loar played college golf at Oklahoma State University (OSU). He won five college tournaments and his team won the NCAA Division I Championship in 2000. He was a four-time All-American at OSU. He also won four amateur events outside of college: the Southwest Amateur in 1997, the Southern Amateur in 1999, and the Sunnehanna Amateur in 1999 and 2000. Loar played on the 1998 Palmer Cup and 1999 Walker Cup teams.

== Professional career ==
In 2000, Loar turned professional after graduating from Oklahoma State. He played on the Asian Tour from 2002 to 2006 and won twice: the 2003 Thailand Open and the 2004 Kolon Korean Open. He played on the Nationwide Tour in 2007 and 2011, where his best finish was a T-3 at 2007 Utah EnergySolutions Championship. He earned his 2012 PGA Tour card by finishing T-18 at the 2011 PGA Tour Qualifying School. He won the 2012 Panama Claro Championship on the Nationwide Tour.

Loar finished well outside the top 125 on the 2012 money list and tried to regain his Tour privileges through Qualifying School. He was two shots off the lead going into the final round, but double-bogeyed the 17th and bogeyed the 18th for a final round 78, missing a Tour card by two shots with a 32nd-place finish; Loar had full status on the Web.com Tour for 2013 as a result of his finish. He finished fourth on the 2013 Web.com Tour regular season money list to earn his 2014 PGA Tour card. In 2013–14, he made only 3 cuts in 19 events and finished 233rd on the FedEx Cup points list and lost his PGA Tour card.

== Personal life ==
Loar married Melaney McDaniel on August 12, 2006 and they have a set of triplets born September 5, 2011.

== Amateur wins ==
- 1997 Southwestern Amateur
- 1999 Sunnehanna Amateur, Southern Amateur
- 2000 Sunnehanna Amateur

== Professional wins (12) ==
=== Asian Tour wins (2) ===
| No. | Date | Tournament | Winning score | Margin of victory | Runner-up |
|---|---|---|---|---|---|
| 1 | Apr 6, 2003 | Thailand Open | −19 (67-66-67-69=269) | 5 strokes | (Australia) Jason Dawes |
| 2 | Sep 12, 2004 | Kolon Korea Open^{1} | −2 (73-69-73-71=286) | 3 strokes | (Scotland) Simon Yates |

^{1}Co-sanctioned by the Korean Tour

Asian Tour playoff record (1–0)

| No. | Year | Tournament | Opponent | Result |
|---|---|---|---|---|
| 1 | 2002 | London Myanmar Open | (Thailand) Thongchai Jaidee | Lost to par on first extra hole |

=== Web.com Tour wins (2) ===
| No. | Date | Tournament | Winning score | Margin of victory | Runner(s)-up |
|---|---|---|---|---|---|
| 1 | Mar 4, 2012 | Panama Claro Championship | −4 (66-68-68-74=276) | 1 stroke | (United States) Ryan Armour, (United States) Luke List, (Australia) Cameron Percy, (United States) Brian Smock |
| 2 | Mar 24, 2013 | Chitimacha Louisiana Open | −17 (68-66-64-69=267) | 2 strokes | (United States) Morgan Hoffmann |

=== Gateway Tour wins (6) ===
- 2008 DFW Series 2, Mid Summer Championship, DFW Series 7, DFW Series 9
- 2009 DFW Summer 1, DFW Summer 8

=== Other wins (2) ===
- 2003 Straight Down Fall Classic (with John Pate)
- 2006 Straight Down Fall Classic (with Don Woodward)

== Results in major championships ==
| Tournament | 2012 | 2013 |
|---|---|---|
| Masters Tournament | | |
| U.S. Open | CUT | T32 |
| The Open Championship | | |
| PGA Championship | | |

Did not play

CUT = missed the half-way cut
"T" = tied

== U.S. national team appearances ==
Amateur

- Palmer Cup: 1998 (tie)
- Walker Cup: 1999

== See also ==
- 2011 PGA Tour Qualifying School graduates
- 2013 Web.com Tour Finals graduates
