= 2026 Players Championship =

Golf tournament

Tournament information
- Dates: March 12–15, 2026
- Location: Ponte Vedra Beach, Florida; 30.198°N 81.394°W
- Courses: TPC Sawgrass (Stadium Course)
- Tour: PGA Tour

Statistics
- Par: 72
- Field: 123 players, 74 after cut
- Cut: 146 (+2)
- Prize fund: US$25,000,000
- Winner's share: US$4,500,000

Champion
- (United States) Cameron Young
- 275 (−13)
- Location in the United States Location in Florida

The 2026 Players Championship was a golf tournament on the PGA Tour, being held at TPC Sawgrass in Ponte Vedra Beach, Florida from March 12–15. Officially, it was the 52nd edition of The Players Championship tournament, but the 49th as a standalone tournament.

== Venue ==
2026 marked the 44th full tournament played on the Stadium Course of TPC at Sawgrass in Ponte Vedra Beach, Florida.

== Field ==
The field consisted of 123 players meeting various criteria; they included tournament winners on the PGA Tour since the previous Players Championship, recent winners of major championships, The Players and World Golf Championships, and leading players in the FedEx Cup standings from the current and preceding seasons. Due to Brooks Koepka competing, the field was increased to 123 under the rules of the PGA Tour Returning Member Program.

=== Eligibility criteria ===
This list details the eligibility criteria for the 2026 Players Championship and the players who qualified under them; any additional criteria under which players are eligible is indicated in parentheses.

1. Winners of PGA Tour events since the 2025 Players Championship

- Akshay Bhatia (9,12,14)
- Keegan Bradley (12,14)
- Michael Brennan (12,14)
- Jacob Bridgeman (11,12,14,15)
- Brian Campbell (12)
- Ricky Castillo
- Nico Echavarría (12,14,15)
- Steven Fisk (12)
- Tommy Fleetwood (7,12,14)
- Ryan Gerard (12,14,15)
- Chris Gotterup (12,14,15)
- Ben Griffin (12,14)
- Brian Harman (6,12)
- Garrick Higgo (12)
- Viktor Hovland (7,10,12,14)
- Kurt Kitayama (12,14)
- Min Woo Lee (12,14,15)
- Rory McIlroy (2,3,7,12,14)
- Collin Morikawa (6,12,14,15)
- William Mouw (12)
- Andrew Novak (12,14)
- Aldrich Potgieter (12)
- Justin Rose (12,14)
- Xander Schauffele (5,6,12,14)
- Scottie Scheffler (2,3,5,6,7,9,10,12,14,15)
- Adam Schenk (12)
- J. J. Spaun (4,12,14)
- Sepp Straka (12,14)
- Justin Thomas (3,5,12,14)
- Sami Välimäki (12,14)
- Cameron Young (12,14)
- Ryan Fox (12,14) withdrew due to kidney stones.

2. Recent winners of the Masters Tournament (2021–2025)

- Hideki Matsuyama (11,12,14,15)

3. Recent winners of The Players Championship (2021–2025)

4. Recent winners of the U.S. Open (2021–2025)

- Wyndham Clark (12)
- Matt Fitzpatrick (12,14)

5. Recent winners of the PGA Championship (2021–2025)

- Brooks Koepka

6. Recent winners of The Open Championship (2021–2025)

7. Recent winners of the FedEx Cup (2021–2025)

- Patrick Cantlay (12,14)

8. Recent winners of the WGC Match Play (2023)

- Sam Burns (12,14)

9. Recent winners of the Arnold Palmer Invitational (2024–2026)

- Russell Henley (12,14)

10. Recent winners of the Memorial Tournament (2023–2025)

11. Recent winners of the Genesis Invitational (2024–2026)

- Ludvig Åberg (12,14)

12. Top 100 from the previous season's FedEx Cup points list

- Daniel Berger
- Christiaan Bezuidenhout
- Bud Cauley
- Eric Cole
- Corey Conners (14)
- Cameron Davis
- Jason Day (14)
- Harris English (14)
- Tony Finau
- Rickie Fowler
- Lucas Glover
- Max Greyserman
- Emiliano Grillo
- Harry Hall
- Joe Highsmith
- Ryo Hisatsune
- Rico Hoey
- Tom Hoge
- Nicolai Højgaard (14)
- Rasmus Højgaard (14)
- Mark Hubbard
- Mackenzie Hughes
- Im Sung-jae
- Stephan Jäger
- Takumi Kanaya
- Michael Kim
- Kim Si-woo (14,15)
- Chris Kirk
- Jake Knapp (14,15)
- Shane Lowry (14)
- Robert MacIntyre (14)
- Denny McCarthy
- Matt McCarty (14)
- Max McGreevy
- Maverick McNealy (14)
- Mac Meissner
- Keith Mitchell
- Thorbjørn Olesen
- Taylor Pendrith
- Chandler Phillips
- J. T. Poston
- Aaron Rai (14)
- Chad Ramey
- Davis Riley
- Patrick Rodgers
- Erik van Rooyen
- Kevin Roy
- Matti Schmid
- Alex Smalley
- Jordan Spieth
- Sam Stevens (14)
- Nick Taylor
- Davis Thompson
- Michael Thorbjornsen
- Jhonattan Vegas
- Karl Vilips
- Danny Walker
- Vince Whaley
- Gary Woodland
- Kevin Yu

13. Top 100 (medical)

- Lee Hodges

14. Top 50 from the Official World Golf Ranking following the Cognizant Classic

- Pierceson Coody
- Alex Norén
- Marco Penge (17)
- Kristoffer Reitan

15. Top 10 in the current season's FedEx Cup points standings after the Cognizant Classic

16. Kaulig Companies Championship champion from previous year

- Miguel Ángel Jiménez did not play.

17. Leading player who earned a PGA Tour card from the 2025 Race to Dubai

18. Leading points winner from the Korn Ferry Tour during the previous year

- Johnny Keefer

19. Remaining positions and alternates filled through current year FedEx Cup standings after the Cognizant Classic

- Zach Bauchou
- Joel Dahmen
- Dou Zecheng
- A. J. Ewart
- Max Homa
- Kim Seong-hyeon
- Patton Kizzire
- Li Haotong
- Taylor Moore
- Matthieu Pavon
- Séamus Power
- Andrew Putnam
- Adam Scott
- Jordan Smith
- Austin Smotherman
- Sahith Theegala
- Sudarshan Yellamaraju

==== Alternates added after field was finalized ====
- David Ford (Note: David Ford replaced Ryan Fox.)

==== Ineligible players ====
The following players met criteria, but having been contracted with LIV Golf, were suspended by the PGA Tour and ineligible to compete:

- An Byeong-hun (12)
- Bryson DeChambeau (4,14)
- Thomas Detry (12)
- Tyrrell Hatton (14)
- Phil Mickelson (5)
- Jon Rahm (2,4)
- Patrick Reed (14)
- Cameron Smith (3,6)

== Round summaries ==
=== First round ===
Thursday, March 12, 2026
Friday, March 13, 2026

Inclement weather delayed play for 21 minutes with a suspension being called at 12:09pm.

Highly touted pre-tournament contender Collin Morikawa was forced to withdraw on the 2nd hole due to an apparent back injury following a practice swing. 5 players were tied for the overnight lead, and the final first round lead, with Americans McNealy, Theegala, Hodges and Smotherman (with 1 to play after being stranded on the 18th green when play was suspended due to darkness) setting the pace alongside Austrian Sepp Straka.

A strong logjam of players emerged one back at 4-under, including Cameron Young, Russell Henley and Justin Thomas, delivering a strong showing after a poor outing at the Arnold Palmer invitational a week before. Following the resumption of play, Smotherman parred the ninth, remaining in the tie for the lead.

Battling a back injury that forced him to withdraw at the Arnold Palmer Invitational a week earlier, World No.2 and reigning champion Rory McIlroy scampered to a round of 74 (+2), struggling significantly on the greens. Pre-tournament favorite and World No.1 Scottie Scheffler struggled with the driver and posted an even-par 72, a score which was matched by numerous prominent names including the returning Brooks Koepka, Justin Rose and 2004 Champion Adam Scott.

Place	Player	Score	To par
T1	(United States) Lee Hodges	67	−5
T1	(United States) Maverick McNealy	67	−5
T1	(United States) Austin Smotherman	67	−5
T1	(Austria) Sepp Straka	67	−5
T1	(United States) Sahith Theegala	67	−5
T6	(United States) Russell Henley	68	−4
T6	(United States) Taylor Moore	68	−4
T6	(United States) Justin Thomas	68	−4
T6	(United States) Cameron Young	68	−4
T10	(Sweden) Ludvig Åberg	69	−3
T10	(Canada) Corey Conners	69	−3
T10	(United States) Tony Finau	69	−3
T10	(England) Tommy Fleetwood	69	−3
T10	(Norway) Viktor Hovland	69	−3
T10	(United States) William Mouw	69	−3
T10	(United States) Xander Schauffele	69	−3

=== Second round ===
Friday, March 13, 2026

Thursday's rain combined with continuous sunshine over Ponte Vedra Beach enabled easier scoring conditions and significant movement up the leaderboard before the cut. Ludvig Åberg turned in 29 (−7) on his front nine holes on his way to a round of 63 (−9), seizing the tournament lead at 12-under. Xander Schauffele hit all 14 fairways off the tee en route to a round of 65 (−7) to move into solo second place at ten-under. Cameron Young remained one back of second place at nine-under, with Justin Thomas turning in a second consecutive 68 to join Corey Conners at eight-under.

World No.1 and pre-tournament favorite Scottie Scheffler birdied hole 18 to ensure he would not miss the cut, which fell at +2. Notables to miss the cut included Rasmus Højgaard (+3), Ben Griffin (+4) and Shane Lowry (+5). 73 players advanced to the weekend.

Place	Player	Score	To par
1	(Sweden) Ludvig Åberg	69-63=132	−12
2	(United States) Xander Schauffele	69-65=134	−10
3	(United States) Cameron Young	68-67=135	−9
T4	(Canada) Corey Conners	69-67=136	−8
T4	(United States) Justin Thomas	68-68=136	−8
6	(Austria) Sepp Straka	67-70=137	−7
T7	(United States) Jacob Bridgeman	70-68=138	−6
T7	(United States) Lee Hodges	67-71=138	−6
T7	(United States) Maverick McNealy	67-71=138	−6
T10	(England) Matt Fitzpatrick	70-69=139	−5
T10	(England) Tommy Fleetwood	69-70=139	−5
T10	(United States) Brian Harman	75-64=139	−5
T10	(United States) Russell Henley	68-71=139	−5
T10	(Norway) Viktor Hovland	69-70=139	−5
T10	(United States) Austin Smotherman	67-72=139	−5
T10	(United States) Michael Thorbjornsen	74-65=139	−5

=== Third round ===
Saturday, March 14, 2026

Due to an incident in the Ponte Vedra Beach area, the gates were not opened to spectators until 9 am, with hospitality areas not opened until 11 am local time. However, round three commenced on time at 8:15 am without delay.

"Moving Day" again provided easier scoring conditions to the 73 players that had made the weekend, however Ludvig Åberg continued to take up the running at the top of the leaderboard. After bogeying hole 18, he turned in a round of 71 (−1) for a 3-round total of 203 (−13), and a 3 shot lead over a charging Michael Thorbjornsen. Cameron Young was in solo second place walking to the 18th hole before making double bogey after going bunker-to-bunker and completing an even-par 72, settling for solo 3rd position. Xander Schauffele struggled to a round of 74 (+2), relegating him to a tie for fourth among 6 challengers. Robert MacIntyre shot the low round of the day, charging up the leaderboard with a round of 65 (−7) that included nine birdies.

Place	Player	Score	To par
1	(Sweden) Ludvig Åberg	69-63-71=203	−13
2	(United States) Michael Thorbjornsen	74-65-67=206	−10
3	(United States) Cameron Young	68-67-72=207	−9
T4	(Canada) Corey Conners	69-67-72=208	−8
T4	(England) Matt Fitzpatrick	70-69-69=208	−8
T4	(United States) Brian Harman	75-64-69=208	−8
T4	(Norway) Viktor Hovland	69-70-69=208	−8
T4	(United States) Xander Schauffele	69-65-74=208	−8
T4	(United States) Justin Thomas	68-68-72=208	−8
T10	(United States) Jacob Bridgeman	70-68-71=209	−7
T10	(Scotland) Robert MacIntyre	72-72-65=209	−7
T10	(United States) Austin Smotherman	67-72-70=209	−7
T10	(Austria) Sepp Straka	67-70-72=209	−7
T10	(United States) Sahith Theegala	67-74-68=209	−7

=== Final round ===
Sunday, March 15, 2026

Cameron Young of the USA shot a final-round 68 (−4) to win the 2026 Players Championship, capturing the title at 13-under-par, one stroke ahead of Matt Fitzpatrick.

Third-round leader Ludvig Åberg entered Sunday with a three-shot advantage and played steady early, turning in a front nine 36 (E) but struggled to maintain control of the tournament from there. Åberg quickly lost momentum after hitting shots into the water on both hole 11 and 12, resulting in a bogey and double bogey respectively, and eventually faded with a closing 76 (+4), opening the door for the chasing pack.

Young began the final round four strokes behind but steadily climbed the leaderboard with a composed front nine of 34 (−2) before igniting his charge on the back nine. Matt Fitzpatrick emerged as his primary challenger as the pair separated themselves from the rest of the field and began to battle down the stretch.

Young was a shot behind Fitzpatrick at −12, but Young stuffed his tee shot on the famed island-green 17th hole to 7 feet, converting the birdie putt to draw level with Fitzpatrick. Fitzpatrick had a chance to match the birdie from 15 feet but failed to convert his putt, leaving the tournament tied at −13 approaching the 72nd hole.

On the 18th hole, Young delivered one of the defining shots of the championship, launching a 375-yard drive, which was the longest recorded on the hole since ShotLink tracking began, setting up a comfortable approach shot which he hit to the fringe within 15 feet of the cup. Fitzpatrick, needing to match Young to force a playoff, faltered after finding trouble with his drive into the pine straw and had to chip out. Fitzpatrick's chip then fell short of the green, and he missed his 8-foot par putt after Young had already lag putted to less than 2 feet on his birdie attempt.

Young calmly tapped in for par to complete a final-round 68 and secure the championship at −13, one stroke ahead of Fitzpatrick. The victory marked the biggest win of Young's career and his second PGA Tour title, following his triumph at the Wyndham Championship the previous season.

Behind the leading duo, Xander Schauffele finished third after a final round 69 (−3), while several contenders, including Robert MacIntyre fell short during the closing stretch. Hideki Matsuyama shot the low round of the day, a 67 (−5) to finish in a tie for 27th.

Champion
(c) = past champion

Place	Player	Score	To par	Money ($)
1	(United States) Cameron Young	68-67-72-68=275	−13	4,500,000
2	(England) Matt Fitzpatrick	70-69-69-68=276	−12	2,225,000
3	(United States) Xander Schauffele	69-65-74-69=277	−11	1,725,000
4	(Scotland) Robert MacIntyre	72-72-65-69=278	−10	1,225,000
T5	(Sweden) Ludvig Åberg	69-63-71-76=279	−9	925,000
T5	(United States) Jacob Bridgeman	70-68-71-70=279	−9	925,000
T5	(Canada) Sudarshan Yellamaraju	73-72-66-68=279	−9	925,000
T8	(England) Tommy Fleetwood	69-70-73-68=280	−8	731,250
T8	(Austria) Sepp Straka	67-70-72-71=280	−8	731,250
T8	(United States) Justin Thomas	68-68-72-72=280	−8	731,250

Leaderboard below the top 10
Place	Player	Score	To par	Money ($)
T11	(United States) Brian Harman	75-64-69-73=281	−7	606,250
T11	(United States) Patrick Rodgers	70-70-71-70=281	−7	606,250
T13	(United States) Akshay Bhatia	71-71-70-70=282	−6	409027
T13	(United States) Sam Burns	76-68-69-69=282	−6	409027
T13	(Canada) Corey Conners	69-67-72-74=282	−6	409027
T13	(United States) Russell Henley	68-71-71-72=282	−6	409027
T13	(Japan) Ryo Hisatsune	71-69-70-72=282	−6	409027
T13	(Norway) Viktor Hovland	69-70-69-74=282	−6	409027
T13	(United States) Brooks Koepka	72-70-69-71=282	−6	409027
T13	(England) Justin Rose	72-68-70-72=282	−6	409027
T13	(United States) Austin Smotherman	67-72-70-73=282	−6	409027
T22	(United States) Scottie Scheffler (c)	72-73-67-71=283	−5	271,250
T22	(United States) Michael Thorbjornsen	74-65-67-77=283	−5	271,250
T24	(United States) William Mouw	69-72-69-74=284	−4	221,250
T24	(United States) Alex Smalley	70-70-71-73=284	−4	221,250
T24	(United States) J. J. Spaun	71-72-68-73=284	−4	221,250
T27	(United States) Ryan Gerard	73-68-73-71=285	−3	178,750
T27	(Norway) Nicolai Højgaard	71-74-71-69=285	−3	178,750
T27	(United States) Chris Kirk	71-74-71-69=285	−3	178,750
T27	(Japan) Hideki Matsuyama	70-72-76-67=285	−3	178,750
T27	(United States) Chad Ramey	72-69-73-71=285	−3	178,750
T32	(United States) Patrick Cantlay	73-73-70-70=286	−2	128,250
T32	(United States) Bud Cauley	70-74-72-70=286	−2	128,250
T32	(United States) Eric Cole	73-73-71-69=286	−2	128,250
T32	(United States) Max Homa	71-72-70-73=286	−2	128,250
T32	(Australia) Min Woo Lee	72-70-70-74=286	−2	128,250
T32	(United States) Maverick McNealy	67-71-73-75=286	−2	128,250
T32	(Sweden) Alex Norén	71-71-73-71=286	−2	128,250
T32	(United States) Andrew Putnam	70-72-73-71=286	−2	128,250
T32	(United States) Jordan Spieth	73-68-76-69=286	−2	128,250
T32	(United States) Sahith Theegala	67-74-68-77=286	−2	128,250
T42	(United States) Wyndham Clark	73-70-71-73=287	−1	91,250
T42	(United States) Rickie Fowler (c)	70-72-75-70=287	−1	91,250
T42	(United States) Joe Highsmith	70-75-68-74=287	−1	91,250
T42	(Canada) Nick Taylor	74-70-70-73=287	−1	91,250
T46	(Northern Ireland) Rory McIlroy (c)	74-71-72-71=288	E	72,125
T46	(United States) Keith Mitchell	72-68-72-76=288	E	72,125
T46	(Canada) Taylor Pendrith	74-69-72-73=288	E	72,125
T46	(Germany) Matti Schmid	70-73-71-74=288	E	72,125
T50	(United States) Zach Bauchou	74-72-69-74=289	+1	61,083
T50	(United States) Keegan Bradley	77-66-68-78=289	+1	61,083
T50	(South Korea) Kim Si-woo (c)	73-72-68-76=289	+1	61,083
T50	(United States) Max McGreevy	72-72-70-75=289	+1	61,083
T50	(United States) Taylor Moore	68-75-72-74=289	+1	61,083
T50	(United States) J. T. Poston	76-69-71-73=289	+1	61,083
T56	(United States) Chris Gotterup	71-73-68-78=290	+2	58,000
T56	(Australia) Adam Scott (c)	72-71-71-75=290	+2	58,000
58	(United States) Sam Stevens	72-72-72-75=291	+3	57,250
T59	(Australia) Jason Day (c)	70-70-72-80=292	+4	56,250
T59	(United States) Lee Hodges	67-71-77-77=292	+4	56,250
T59	(United States) Kevin Roy	75-71-71-75=192	+4	56,250
T62	(United States) Steven Fisk	75-71-75-72=293	+5	54,500
T62	(Philippines) Rico Hoey	77-69-75-72=293	+5	54,500
T62	(Germany) Stephan Jäger	75-71-69-79=293	+5	54,500
T62	(United States) Danny Walker	71-75-78-69=293	+5	54,500
T66	(United States) Daniel Berger	72-74-75-73=294	+6	52,750
T66	(Colombia) Nico Echavarría	74-71-72-77=294	+6	52,750
T66	(Norway) Kristoffer Reitan	75-71-76-72=294	+6	52,750
69	(United States) Michael Brennan	72-74-73-76=295	+7	51,750
T70	(United States) Ricky Castillo	71-74-77-74=296	+8	50,750
T70	(United States) Tony Finau	69-75-75=77=296	+8	50,750
T70	(Republic of Ireland) Séamus Power	74-72-74-76=296	+8	50,750
73	(Japan) Takumi Kanaya	73-72-81-72=298	+10	49,750
CUT	(United States) Brian Campbell	74-73=147	+3	0
CUT	(United States) David Ford	75-72=147	+3	0
CUT	(United States) Lucas Glover	70-77=147	+3	0
CUT	(Denmark) Rasmus Højgaard	75-72=147	+3	0
CUT	(South Korea) Im Sung-jae	75-72=147	+3	0
CUT	(United States) Jake Knapp	75-72=147	+3	0
CUT	(United States) Matt McCarty	75-72=147	+3	0
CUT	(United States) Mac Meissner	73-74=147	+3	0
CUT	(United States) Adam Schenk	77-70=147	+3	0
CUT	(Venezuela) Jhonattan Vegas	75-72=147	+3	0
CUT	(United States) Ben Griffin	70-78=148	+4	0
CUT	(England) Harry Hall	76-72=148	+4	0
CUT	(United States) Johnny Keefer	76-72=148	+4	0
CUT	(China) Li Haotong	74-74=148	+4	0
CUT	(England) Aaron Rai	74-74=148	+4	0
CUT	(United States) Davis Thompson	73-75=148	+4	0
CUT	(South Africa) Erik van Rooyen	77-71=148	+4	0
CUT	(United States) Gary Woodland	75-73=148	+4	0
CUT	(South Korea) Kim Seong-hyeon	75-74=149	+5	0
CUT	(United States) Kurt Kitayama	74-75=149	+5	0
CUT	(Republic of Ireland) Shane Lowry	76-73=149	+5	0
CUT	(Denmark) Thorbjørn Olesen	79-70=149	+5	0
CUT	(France) Matthieu Pavon	75-74=149	+5	0
CUT	(United States) Vince Whaley	77-72=149	+5	0
CUT	(South Africa) Christiaan Bezuidenhout	73-77=150	+6	0
CUT	(United States) Joel Dahmen	77-73=150	+6	0
CUT	(Australia) Cameron Davis	77-73=150	+6	0
CUT	(China) Dou Zecheng	76-74=150	+6	0
CUT	(United States) Harris English	73-77=150	+6	0
CUT	(United States) Mark Hubbard	74-76=150	+6	0
CUT	(United States) Andrew Novak	75-75=150	+6	0
CUT	(Canada) Mackenzie Hughes	74-77=151	+7	0
CUT	(United States) Denny McCarthy	76-75=151	+7	0
CUT	(England) Marco Penge	75-76=151	+7	0
CUT	(South Africa) Aldrich Potgieter	74-77=151	+7	0
CUT	(South Africa) Garrick Higgo	76-76=152	+8	0
CUT	(United States) Patton Kizzire	80-72=152	+8	0
CUT	(England) Jordan Smith	79-73=152	+8	0
CUT	(Finland) Sami Välimäki	78-74=152	+8	0
CUT	(Australia) Karl Vilips	73-79=152	+8	0
CUT	(Canada) A. J. Ewart	78-75=153	+9	0
CUT	(United States) Max Greyserman	73-80=153	+9	0
CUT	(United States) Tom Hoge	73-80=153	+9	0
CUT	(United States) Michael Kim	73-81=154	+10	0
CUT	(United States) Pierceson Coody	75-83=158	+14	0
CUT	(United States) Chandler Phillips	80-78=158	+14	0
CUT	(Taiwan) Kevin Yu	80-78=158	+14	0
CUT	(Argentina) Emiliano Grillo	84-77=161	+17	0
CUT	(United States) Davis Riley	84-79=163	+19	0
WD	(United States) Collin Morikawa			0
