= 2026 PGA Championship field =

This list details the qualification criteria for the 2026 PGA Championship and the players who qualified under them; any additional criteria under which players qualified are indicated in parentheses.

1. All past winners of the PGA Championship

- Keegan Bradley (8,10,12)
- Jason Day (10)
- Jason Dufner
- Pádraig Harrington
- Martin Kaymer
- Brooks Koepka
- Rory McIlroy (2,5,10,11,12)
- Shaun Micheel
- Collin Morikawa (4,10,11,12)
- Xander Schauffele (4,10,11,12)
- Scottie Scheffler (2,4,5,8,10,11,12)
- Justin Thomas (10,11)
- Jimmy Walker
- Yang Yong-eun
- Paul Azinger, Rich Beem, Mark Brooks, John Daly, Steve Elkington, Raymond Floyd, Al Geiberger, Wayne Grady, David Graham, Davis Love III, John Mahaffey, Phil Mickelson, Larry Nelson, Bobby Nichols, Jack Nicklaus, Gary Player, Nick Price, Vijay Singh, Jeff Sluman, Dave Stockton, Hal Sutton, David Toms, Lee Trevino, Bob Tway, Lanny Wadkins and Tiger Woods did not play.

2. Recent winners of the Masters Tournament (2022–2026)

- Jon Rahm (3,8,11)

3. Recent winners of the U.S. Open (2021–2025)

- Wyndham Clark (10)
- Bryson DeChambeau (8,11)
- Matt Fitzpatrick (8,10,11,12)
- J. J. Spaun (10,11,12)

4. Recent winners of The Open Championship (2021–2025)

- Brian Harman (10,12)
- Cameron Smith

5. Recent winners of The Players Championship (2024–2026)

- Cameron Young (10,11,12)

6. The top three on the Official World Golf Ranking's International Federation Ranking List as of April 27, 2026

- Kazuki Higa
- Casey Jarvis
- Travis Smyth

7. Current Senior PGA Champion

- Stewart Cink

8. The leading 15 players, and those tying for 15th place, in the 2025 PGA Championship

- Harris English (10,11)
- Ryan Gerard (10,12)
- Ben Griffin (10,11,12)
- Joe Highsmith
- Kim Si-woo (10)
- Denny McCarthy
- Joaquín Niemann
- Taylor Pendrith (10)
- J. T. Poston
- Davis Riley
- Jhonattan Vegas

9. The leading 20 players in the 2026 PGA Professional Championship

- Derek Berg
- Francisco Bidé
- Michael Block
- Tyler Collet
- Jesse Droemer
- Bryce Fisher
- Chris Gabriele
- Mark Geddes
- Zach Haynes
- Austin Hurt
- Jared Jones
- Michael Kartrude
- Ben Kern
- Ryan Lenahan
- Paul McClure
- Ben Polland
- Garrett Sapp
- Braden Shattuck
- Ryan Vermeer
- Timothy Wiseman

10. Top 70 players who are eligible and have earned the most PGA Championship Points since the 2025 PGA Championship, as of May 4, 2026

- Ludvig Åberg (11)
- Daniel Berger
- Akshay Bhatia (12)
- Jacob Bridgeman (12)
- Sam Burns (11)
- Patrick Cantlay (11)
- Bud Cauley
- Corey Conners
- Pierceson Coody
- Nico Echavarría (12)
- Tommy Fleetwood (11,12)
- Rickie Fowler
- Ryan Fox (12)
- Chris Gotterup (12)
- Max Greyserman
- Emiliano Grillo
- Harry Hall
- Russell Henley (11)
- Ryo Hisatsune
- Rico Hoey
- Nicolai Højgaard
- Viktor Hovland (11)
- Michael Kim
- Chris Kirk
- Kurt Kitayama (12)
- Min Woo Lee
- David Lipsky
- Shane Lowry (11)
- Robert MacIntyre (11)
- Hideki Matsuyama
- Matt McCarty
- Maverick McNealy
- Alex Norén
- Andrew Novak
- Aldrich Potgieter (12)
- Andrew Putnam
- Patrick Rodgers
- Justin Rose (11,12)
- Matti Schmid
- Adam Scott
- Alex Smalley
- Jordan Spieth
- Sam Stevens
- Sepp Straka (11)
- Nick Taylor
- Sahith Theegala
- Michael Thorbjornsen
- Sami Välimäki (12)
- Matt Wallace
- Gary Woodland (12)
- Jake Knapp did not play due to injury.

11. Playing members of the 2025 Ryder Cup teams, who are ranked within the top 100 on the Official World Golf Ranking as of May 4, 2026

- Tyrrell Hatton
- Rasmus Højgaard

12. Winners of official tournaments on the PGA Tour from the 2025 PGA Championship until the start of the championship

- Michael Brennan
- Brian Campbell
- Ricky Castillo
- Steven Fisk
- Alex Fitzpatrick
- William Mouw
- Kristoffer Reitan
- Adam Schenk
- Brandt Snedeker

13. Top 3 finishers on the DP World Tour Asian Swing event rankings

- Jordan Gumberg
- Mikael Lindberg
- Bernd Wiesberger

14. PGA of America invitees

- Ángel Ayora
- Christiaan Bezuidenhout
- Chandler Blanchet
- Dan Brown
- Thomas Detry
- Luke Donald
- Lucas Glover
- Garrick Higgo
- Daniel Hillier
- Billy Horschel
- Ian Holt
- Im Sung-jae
- Stephan Jäger
- Dustin Johnson
- Kota Kaneko
- Johnny Keefer
- Li Haotong
- Max McGreevy
- Tom McKibbin
- Keith Mitchell
- Rasmus Neergaard-Petersen
- John Parry
- Marco Penge
- David Puig
- Aaron Rai
- Patrick Reed
- Adrien Saddier
- Jayden Schaper
- Jordan Smith
- Austin Smotherman
- Elvis Smylie
- Andy Sullivan

15. If necessary, the field is completed by players in order of PGA Championship points earned (per 10)

- Max Homa (73rd) (Note: Max Homa replaced Phil Mickelson.)
- Sudarshan Yellamaraju (80th) (Note: Sudarshan Yellamaraju took the place reserved for the winner of the Truist Championship.)
- Tom Hoge (86th) (Note: Tom Hoge replaced Jake Knapp.)
