= 2024 Korn Ferry Tour graduates =

Top 30 players on the 2024 Korn Ferry Tour

This is a list of golfers who graduated from the Korn Ferry Tour in 2024. The top 30 players on the 2024 Korn Ferry Tour points list earned PGA Tour cards for 2025.

Matt McCarty earned a full exemption for the 2024 PGA Tour season by leading the points list and an immediate promotion to the PGA Tour with his third win of the Korn Ferry Tour season in August; in October he won the Black Desert Championship, his second PGA Tour event after promotion.

	Player	Points rank	Points
(United States)	Matt McCarty^	1	2,703
(United States)	Max McGreevy	2	2,149
(United States)	Frankie Capan III*	3	1,793
(United States)	Steven Fisk*	4	1,730
(Sweden)	Tim Widing*	5	1,709
(United States)	Taylor Dickson*	6	1,538
(United States)	Brian Campbell	7	1,512
(United States)	Harry Higgs	8	1,395
(Germany)	Thomas Rosenmüller*	9	1,390
(United States)	William Mouw*	10	1,319
(United States)	Quade Cummins*	11	1,271
(United States)	Ryan Gerard^{†}	12	1,262
(United States)	Kevin Roy	13	1,260
(Chile)	Cristóbal del Solar*	14	1,219
(United States)	Kevin Velo*	15	1,143
(United States)	Braden Thornberry*	16	1,117
(United States)	Paul Peterson*	17	1,050
(United States)	Isaiah Salinda*	18	1,049
(Australia)	Karl Vilips*	19	1,020
(United States)	Jackson Suber*	20	1,019
(Germany)	Jeremy Paul*	21	1,000
(United States)	Mason Andersen*	22	983
(United States)	John Pak*	23	962
(Norway)	Kristoffer Ventura	24	955
(Japan)	Kaito Onishi*	25	855
(United States)	Ricky Castillo*	26	823
(United States)	Trevor Cone	27	819
(United States)	Danny Walker*	28	815
(South Africa)	Aldrich Potgieter*	29	812
(United States)	Noah Goodwin*	30	808

^Finished in the Top 125 of the final 2024 FedEx Cup Fall Standings, therefore exhausting rookie status prior to the 2025 season
*PGA Tour rookie in 2025
^{†}First-time PGA Tour member in 2025, but ineligible for rookie status due to having played eight or more PGA Tour events as a professional in a previous season

== Wins on the PGA Tour in 2025 ==
No.	Date	Player	Tournament	Winning score	Margin of victory	Runner(s)-up	Payout ($)
1	Feb 23	(United States) Brian Campbell	Mexico Open	−20 (65-65-64-70=264)	Playoff	(South Africa) Aldrich Potgieter	1,260,000
2	Mar 9	(Australia) Karl Vilips	Puerto Rico Open	−26 (65-67-66-64=262)	3 strokes	(Denmark) Rasmus Neergaard-Petersen	720,000
3	Jun 29	(South Africa) Aldrich Potgieter	Rocket Mortgage Classic	−22 (62-70-65-69=266)	Playoff	(United States) Max Greyserman, (United States) Chris Kirk	1,728,000
4	Jul 6	(United States) Brian Campbell (2)	John Deere Classic	−18 (65-66-68-67=270)	Playoff	(Argentina) Emiliano Grillo	1,512,000
5	Jul 13	(United States) William Mouw	ISCO Championship	−10 (67-73-69-61=270)	1 stroke	(United States) Paul Peterson	720,000
6	Jul 20	(United States) Ryan Gerard	Barracuda Championship	47 pts (13+7+15+12=47)	3 pts	(South Africa) Erik van Rooyen	720,000
7	Oct 5	(United States) Steven Fisk	Sanderson Farms Championship	−24 (60-65-65-64=264)	2 strokes	(South Africa) Garrick Higgo	1,080,000

== Runner-up finishes on the PGA Tour in 2025 ==
No.	Date	Player	Tournament	Winner	Winning score	Runner-up score	Payout ($)
1	Feb 23	(South Africa) Aldrich Potgieter	Mexico Open	(United States) Brian Campbell	−20 (65-65-64-70=264)	−20 (65-61-67-71=264)	763,000
2	Apr 6	(United States) Ryan Gerard	Valero Texas Open	(United States) Brian Harman	−9 (66-66-72-75=279)	−6 (73-66-74-69=282)	1,035,500
3	Apr 13	(Germany) Jeremy Paul	Corales Puntacana Championship	(South Africa) Garrick Higgo	−14 (64-68-70-72=274)	−13 (66-70-67-72=275)	243,400
4	May 11	(United States) Harry Higgs	Oneflight Myrtle Beach Classic	(New Zealand) Ryan Fox	−15 (65-70-68-66=269)	−15 (67-66-68-68=269)	356,000
5	Jul 13	(United States) Paul Peterson	ISCO Championship	(United States) William Mouw	−10 (67-73-69-61=270)	−9 (67-68-67-69=271)	436,000
6	Nov 23	(United States) Max McGreevy	RSM Classic	(Finland) Sami Välimäki	−23 (66-62-65-66=259)	−22 (64-67-66-63=260)	763,000

== Results on the PGA Tour in 2025 ==
Player	Starts	Cuts made	Best finish	Earnings ($)	FedEx Cup rank
(United States) Matt McCarty	26	17	T3	2,308,452	81
(United States) Max McGreevy	31	18	2	2,522,721	60
(United States) Frankie Capan III*	28	10	3/T3	1,108,327	127
(United States) Steven Fisk*	27	16	Win	1,804,525	73
(Sweden) Tim Widing	21	5	T24	80,950	207
(United States) Taylor Dickson*	26	10	T4	463,642	174
(United States) Brian Campbell	24	11	Win x2	3,370,767	46
(United States) Harry Higgs	27	14	T2	908,846	132
(Germany) Thomas Rosenmüller*	26	16	T12	556,197	151
(United States) William Mouw*	23	13	Win	1,597,314	89
(United States) Quade Cummins*	26	16	T12	556,303	157
(United States) Ryan Gerard^{†}	29	24	Win	3,872,916	39
(United States) Kevin Roy	29	18	T3	1,734,139	91
(Chile) Cristóbal del Solar*	26	10	T12	250,132	187
(United States) Kevin Velo*	27	8	T8	290,109	182
(United States) Braden Thornberry*	26	8	T10	301,674	177
(United States) Paul Peterson*	26	10	2	848,337	144
(United States) Isaiah Salinda*	26	16	3	1,363,322	106
(Australia) Karl Vilips*	21	12	Win	1,479,028	100
(United States) Jackson Suber*	26	13	T6 x2	1,254,486	124
(Germany) Jeremy Paul*	26	13	T2	823,634	135
(United States) Mason Andersen*	26	9	T22	213,335	184
(United States) John Pak*	26	13	T7	622,055	152
(Norway) Kristoffer Ventura	28	18	T4	1,180,201	115
(Japan) Kaito Onishi*	26	6	T18	145,336	200
(United States) Ricky Castillo*	28	16	3	1,463,762	102
(United States) Trevor Cone	25	11	T4	544,059	161
(United States) Danny Walker*	26	11	T3	1,561,918	97
(South Africa) Aldrich Potgieter*	20	8	Win	3,038,146	56
(United States) Noah Goodwin*	25	12	T10	796,403	142

- Retained his PGA Tour card for 2026: won or finished in the top 100 of the final FedEx Cup points list through the 2025 Fed Ex Cup Fall Season.
- Retained PGA Tour conditional status for 2026: finished between 101 and 150 on the final FedEx Cup list through the 2025 Fed Ex Cup Fall Season.
- Failed to retain his PGA Tour card for 2026: finished lower than 150 on the final FedEx Cup list through the 2025 Fed Ex Cup Fall Season.

== See also ==
- 2024 PGA Tour Qualifying School graduates
- 2024 Race to Dubai dual card winners
