= 2024 Race to Dubai dual card winners =

This is a list of the 10 European Tour (DP World Tour) players who earned PGA Tour card for the 2025 season via the 2024 Race to Dubai.

The top 10 players on the Race to Dubai (not otherwise exempt) earned status to play on the 2025 PGA Tour. They were as follows:

			2024 European Tour		2025 PGA Tour				
Rank	Cty	Player	R2D pos.	Points	Starts	Cuts made	Best finish	FedEx Cup rank	Prize money ($)
1	(Denmark)	Rasmus Højgaard (Note: PGA Tour rookie in 2025)	2	4,019	20	15	2	84	2,103,443
2	(South Africa)	Thriston Lawrence	3	3,316	19	7	T8	163	728,082
3	(England)	Paul Waring	5	2,630	12	2	T47	223	26,401
4	(Sweden)	Jesper Svensson	10	2,322	26	19	T10	111	1,292,826
5	(Denmark)	Niklas Nørgaard	11	2,274	21	9	T5	159	543,656
6	(Italy)	Matteo Manassero (Note: First-time PGA Tour member in 2025, but ineligible for rookie status due to having played eight or more PGA Tour events in a previous season(s))	12	2,168	18	10	T6	166	617,348
7	(Denmark)	Thorbjørn Olesen	13	2,085	24	16	T3	96	1,438,925
8	(France)	Antoine Rozner	15	2,067	22	17	T13	156	710,528
9	(Japan)	Rikuya Hoshino	16	1,995	20	8	8	173	363,756
10	(Northern Ireland)	Tom McKibbin	18	1,898	n/a (Note: McKibbin became ineligible for the 2025 PGA Tour season, having joined LIV Golf in January 2025.)				

- Retained his PGA Tour card for 2026: won or finished in the top 100 of the final FedEx Cup points list through the 2025 Fed Ex Cup Fall Season.
- Retained PGA Tour conditional status for 2026: finished between 101 and 150 on the final FedEx Cup list through the 2025 Fed Ex Cup Fall Season.
- Failed to retain his PGA Tour card for 2026: finished lower than 150 on the final FedEx Cup list through the 2025 Fed Ex Cup Fall Season.

== 2025 PGA Tour runner-up finishes ==
No.	Date	Player	Tournament	Winners	Winning score	Runner-up score	Prize money ($)
1	27 Apr	(Denmark) Rasmus Højgaard (with (Denmark) Nicolai Højgaard)	Zurich Classic of New Orleans	(United States) Ben Griffin and (United States) Andrew Novak	−28 (62-66-61-71=260)	−27 (59-70-64-68=261)	542,800

== See also ==
- 2024 Korn Ferry Tour graduates
- 2024 PGA Tour Qualifying School graduates
