= Taylor Dickson =

American professional golfer (born 1992)

Personal information
- Nationality: United States
- Born: October 7, 1992 (age 34) Gastonia, North Carolina, U.S.
- Height: 6 ft 0 in (183 cm)
- Weight: 220 lb (100 kg)
- Spouse: LeeAnn

Career
- Sport: Golf
- College: Winthrop University
- Turned professional: 2015
- Current tour: PGA Tour
- Former tour: Korn Ferry Tour
- Professional wins: 3

Number of wins by tour
- Korn Ferry Tour: 3

Taylor Dickson (born October 7, 1992) is an American professional golfer who has played on the PGA Tour and Korn Ferry Tour.

== Early life and amateur career ==
Dickson was born in Gastonia, North Carolina. He took up golf in high school, where he was a teammate of fellow future professional golfer Harold Varner III. He went on to play golf at Winthrop University, where he won two tournaments before turning professional in 2015.

== Professional career ==
Dickson spent the early part of his professional career on the Florida Elite and SwingThought Tour, before reaching the Korn Ferry Tour. He had a career year on that circuit in 2024, winning both the Astara Chile Classic and the Blue Cross and Blue Shield of Kansas Wichita Open en route to earning a PGA Tour card for the 2025 season. After finishing 174th in the 2025 FedEx Cup standings, he returned to the Korn Ferry Tour and kicked off the 2026 season with a win at The Bahamas Golf Classic.

== Amateur wins ==
- 2011 Maryland Intercollegiate
- 2013 Pinetree Intercollegiate

== Professional wins (3) ==
=== Korn Ferry Tour wins (3) ===
No.	Date	Tournament	Winning score	Margin of victory	Runner(s)-up
1	Mar 10, 2024	Astara Chile Classic	−17 (68-67-70-66=271)	Playoff	(United States) Trey Winstead
2	Jun 16, 2024	Blue Cross and Blue Shield of Kansas Wichita Open	−19 (64-64-68-65=261)	1 stroke	(United States) William Mouw, (United States) Sam Stevens
3	Jan 14, 2026	The Bahamas Golf Classic	−27 (67-62-67-65=261)	3 strokes	(Canada) Roger Sloan

Korn Ferry Tour playoff record (1–0)

No.	Year	Tournament	Opponent	Result
1	2024	Astara Chile Classic	(United States) Trey Winstead	Won with par on first extra hole

== See also ==
- 2024 Korn Ferry Tour graduates
- 2026 Korn Ferry Tour graduates
