= Widing =

Widing is a Swedish surname. Notable people with the surname include:

- Daniel Widing (born 1982), Swedish ice hockey player
- Juha Widing (1947–1984), Swedish ice hockey player
- Tim Widing (born 1997), Swedish golfer
