= Braden Thornberry =

American professional golfer (born 1997)

Personal information
- Full name: William Braden Thornberry
- Nationality: United States
- Born: April 11, 1997 (age 29) Germantown, Tennessee, U.S.
- Height: 6 ft 0 in (1.83 m)

Career
- Sport: Golf
- College: University of Mississippi
- Turned professional: 2018
- Current tour: PGA Tour
- Former tour: Korn Ferry Tour
- Professional wins: 1

Number of wins by tour
- Korn Ferry Tour: 1

Best results in major championships
- Masters Tournament: DNP
- PGA Championship: DNP
- U.S. Open: CUT: 2018
- The Open Championship: DNP

Achievements and awards
- Haskins Award: 2017
- Mark H. McCormack Medal: 2018

William Braden Thornberry (born April 11, 1997) is an American professional golfer noted for his amateur success. He won the 2017 NCAA Division I Men's Golf Championship individual title and was a member of the victorious U.S. teams at the 2017 Walker Cup and the 2018 Arnold Palmer Cup. He was the number one ranked amateur golfer in the world during 2018 and received the Haskins Award and the Mark H. McCormack Medal.

== Early life and amateur career ==
Thornberry enjoyed success as a junior golfer, and won the 2011 Future Masters, the 2012 Mississippi Junior, and the 2013 Bubba Conlee National Junior. He shot a round of 61 at TPC Southwind in a local junior event in August 2012.

Thornberry enrolled at the University of Mississippi in 2015 and played with the Ole Miss Rebels men's golf team. He won two titles as a freshman and was named First-Team All-American. As a sophomore, he collected five individual wins throughout the season and at 69.57 led the nation in stroke average. He captured the NCAA Division I Men's Golf Championship individual title with a score of 11 under (66-71-69-71=277), and earned the Haskins Award, given to the most outstanding men's collegiate golfer. He was also named to the 2017 All-Nicklaus Team.

Thornberry made his PGA Tour debut at the 2017 FedEx St. Jude Classic in Memphis where he tied for fourth, the highest amateur finisher at the tournament since 1965 and the best amateur finish on the PGA Tour in 2017. At the U.S. Amateur, he defeated world number one Joaquín Niemann, and replaced him as number one in the World Amateur Golf Ranking. He won the Sunnehanna Amateur in a playoff with Collin Morikawa, with a score of 13 under (68-69-65-65=267).

He represented the United States at the 2017 Walker Cup at Los Angeles Country Club, alongside Collin Morikawa, Scottie Scheffler and Will Zalatoris. Thornberry secured two singles victories to contribute to a convincing 19–7 triumph over Great Britain and Ireland.

As a junior, he collected four victories throughout the season to increase his career total to a school-record 11. He was a Ben Hogan Award finalist, Haskins Award finalist for the second consecutive season, and semi-finalist for the Jack Nicklaus Award, given to the best NCAA Division I golfer. He tied for 61st at the PGA Tour's RSM Classic where he shot a 64 in the second round, and placed 22nd at the Web.com Tour's North Mississippi Classic.

Thornberry qualified for the 2018 U.S. Open where he missed the cut by one stroke, and tied for 26th at the 2018 FedEx St. Jude Classic. He represented the United States in the 2018 Arnold Palmer Cup at Evian Resort Golf Club, and shot a round of 64 at U.S. Amateur at Pebble Beach Golf Links. Thornberry earned Mark H. McCormack Medal in August 2018, given to the world's highest ranked amateur after the U.S. Amateur. He turned professional in December 2018 and decided to forgo the second half of his senior season. He forfeited his exemptions to the 2019 U.S. Open and 2019 Open Championship by turning professional.

== Professional career ==
Thornberry joined the 2019 Korn Ferry Tour, where his best finish was a tie for 5th at the Lincoln Land Championship. During the 2020–21 season, his best finishes were a tie for 8th at the Wichita Open in 2020 and a tie for 5th at the MGM Resorts Championship in 2021. In 2022, he finished in a tie for 13th at the Live and Work in Maine Open.

He shared the lead at the halfway stage for the first time at the 2022 Lake Charles Championship after posting rounds of 66 and 67. He ultimately finished tied 35th. Thornberry earned his first professional win at the 2024 Korn Ferry Tour Championship, earning his PGA Tour card.

== Amateur wins ==
- 2011 Future Masters
- 2012 Evitt Foundation RTC Junior All-Star, Mississippi Junior
- 2013 Bubba Conlee National Junior, Under Armour-Jeff Overton Championship
- 2014 Greg Norman Champions Golf Academy Junior Championship
- 2015 Patriot All-America
- 2016 FAU Slomin Autism Invite, Old Waverly Collegiate Championship, FAMC Intercollegiate, AutoTrader.com Collegiate Classic, Warrior Princeville Makai Invite
- 2017 NCAA Division I Men's Golf Championship, Sunnehanna Amateur, Jones Cup Invitational, Shoal Creek Intercollegiate, FAMC Intercollegiate
- 2018 Hootie at Bulls Bay Intercollegiate, Old Waverly Collegiate Championship

== Professional wins (1) ==
=== Korn Ferry Tour wins (1) ===
Legend
Finals events (1)
Other Korn Ferry Tour (0)

No.	Date	Tournament	Winning score	Margin of victory	Runners-up
1	Oct 6, 2024	Korn Ferry Tour Championship	−9 (71-72-70-66=279)	1 stroke	(United States) Brian Campbell, (United States) Alistair Docherty, (United States) Doc Redman

== Results in major championships ==
Tournament	2018
Masters Tournament	
U.S. Open	CUT
The Open Championship	
PGA Championship	

Did not play

CUT = missed the half-way cut

== U.S. national team appearances ==
- Walker Cup: 2017 (winners)
- Arnold Palmer Cup: 2018 (winners)

== See also ==
- 2024 Korn Ferry Tour graduates
