= Harry Higgs =

American professional golfer (born 1991)

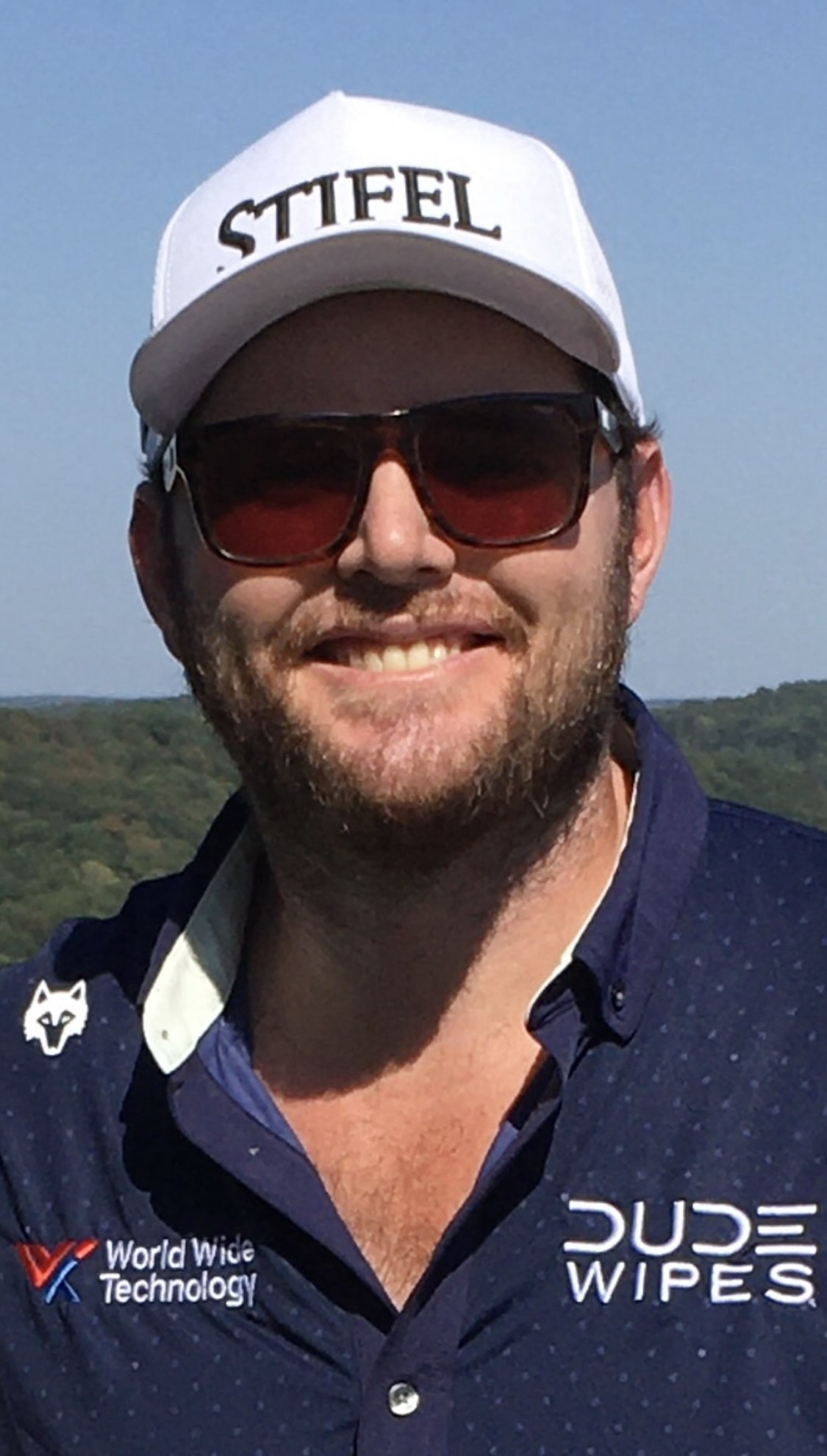
- Higgs in 2024

Personal information
- Nickname: Big Rig
- Nationality: United States
- Born: December 4, 1991 (age 34) Camden, New Jersey, U.S.
- Height: 6 ft 2 in (188 cm)
- Weight: 235 lb (107 kg)

Career
- Sport: Golf
- College: Southern Methodist University
- Turned professional: 2014
- Current tour: PGA Tour
- Former tours: PGA Tour Latinoamérica; Korn Ferry Tour
- Professional wins: 4
- Highest ranking: 91 (September 13, 2020) (as of October 25, 2026)

Number of wins by tour
- Korn Ferry Tour: 3
- Other: 1

Best results in major championships
- Masters Tournament: T14: 2022
- PGA Championship: T4: 2021
- U.S. Open: T43: 2026
- The Open Championship: DNP

Achievements and awards
- PGA Tour Latinoamérica Order of Merit winner: 2018

Harry Higgs (born December 4, 1991) is an American professional golfer who plays on the PGA Tour.

== Early life ==
Higgs was born in Camden, New Jersey on December 4, 1991. He grew up in Overland Park, Kansas. His parents are Mike and Denise Higgs.

== Amateur career ==
He played his high school golf at Blue Valley North High School in Overland Park, Kansas and his college golf for the SMU Mustangs.

== Professional career ==
Higgs played on PGA Tour Latinoamérica in 2015 and 2018. He won the Diners Club Peru Open in 2018 and led the Order of Merit, securing a tour card on the 2019 Korn Ferry Tour.

Higgs won the Price Cutter Charity Championship on the 2019 Korn Ferry Tour. This led him to a 5th-place finish in the regular season standings, which earned him his tour card for the 2019–20 PGA Tour season. He finished second at the Bermuda Championship in November 2019. He also finished second at the 2020 Safeway Open.

In May 2021, Higgs played in his first major tournament, the 2021 PGA Championship at the Ocean Course at Kiawah Island Golf Resort. He shot a bogey-free round on the final day to finish tied for fourth. This finish got him into the field for the 2022 Masters Tournament.

== Personal life ==
Higgs' younger brother, Alex, used to be a professional golfer but is now a caddie. Both played college golf at Southern Methodist University. Alex caddied for Harry when Harry was a senior at SMU.

== Professional wins (4) ==
=== Korn Ferry Tour wins (3) ===
No.	Date	Tournament	Winning score	Margin of victory	Runner(s)-up
1	Jul 28, 2019	Price Cutter Charity Championship	−22 (66-68-65-67=266)	2 strokes	(United States) Andrew Svoboda, (United States) Steve Wheatcroft
2	May 19, 2024	AdventHealth Championship	−19 (71-67-65-66=269)	Playoff	(United States) Tanner Gore
3	May 26, 2024	Visit Knoxville Open	−19 (64-65-67-65=261)	Playoff	(United States) Frankie Capan III

Korn Ferry Tour playoff record (2–0)

No.	Year	Tournament	Opponent	Result
1	2024	AdventHealth Championship	(United States) Tanner Gore	Won with birdie on first extra hole
2	2024	Visit Knoxville Open	(United States) Frankie Capan III	Won with eagle on second extra hole

=== PGA Tour Latinoamérica wins (1) ===
No.	Date	Tournament	Winning score	Margin of victory	Runners-up
1	Oct 21, 2018	Diners Club Peru Open	−19 (67-69-65-68=269)	2 strokes	(Spain) Mario Beltrán, (United States) David Denlinger

== Playoff record ==
PGA Tour playoff record (0–1)

No.	Year	Tournament	Opponents	Result
1	2025	Oneflight Myrtle Beach Classic	(New Zealand) Ryan Fox, (Canada) Mackenzie Hughes	Fox won with birdie on first extra hole

== Results in major championships ==
Tournament	2021	2022	2023	2024	2025	2026
Masters Tournament		T14				
PGA Championship	T4	CUT				
U.S. Open				CUT		T43
The Open Championship						

Top 10
Did not play

CUT = missed the half-way cut
"T" = tied

== Results in The Players Championship ==
Tournament	2021	2022
The Players Championship	T29	CUT

CUT = missed the halfway cut
"T" indicates a tie for a place

== Team appearances ==
- Aruba Cup (representing PGA Tour Latinoamérica): 2018 (winners, playing captain)

== See also ==
- 2019 Korn Ferry Tour Finals graduates
- 2024 Korn Ferry Tour graduates
