= Max McGreevy =

American professional golfer (born 1995)

Personal information
- Nationality: United States
- Born: May 3, 1995 (age 31) Edmond, Oklahoma, U.S.
- Height: 5 ft 11 in (180 cm)
- Weight: 160 lb (73 kg)
- Spouse: Olivia (m. 2022)

Career
- Sport: Golf
- College: University of Oklahoma
- Turned professional: 2017
- Current tour: PGA Tour
- Former tours: Korn Ferry Tour; PGA Tour Canada; PGA Tour China
- Professional wins: 8
- Highest ranking: 65 (November 23, 2025) (as of October 25, 2026)

Number of wins by tour
- Japan Golf Tour: 1
- Korn Ferry Tour: 3
- Other: 4

Best results in major championships
- Masters Tournament: DNP
- PGA Championship: CUT: 2025, 2026
- U.S. Open: T32: 2026
- The Open Championship: DNP

Achievements and awards
- PGA Tour China Order of Merit winner: 2019

Max McGreevy (born May 3, 1995) is an American professional golfer and PGA Tour player.

== Early life and family ==
McGreevy was born in Edmond, Oklahoma and graduated in 2017 from the University of Oklahoma. His father Brian won the 1998 Oklahoma State Amateur and played golf at the University of Kansas, and his uncle Tom played golf at Arizona State University.

== Amateur career ==
McGreevy helped secure the 2017 NCAA Championship for Oklahoma, winning his semi-final and final matches.

== Professional career ==
McGreevy turned professional in 2017 and joined the PGA Tour Canada, where he was runner-up at the Staal Foundation Open, and joined the 2018 Korn Ferry Tour. In 2019, he joined the PGA Tour China, where he won the Guangzhou Open and the Order of Merit. This earned him a card for the 2020–21 Korn Ferry Tour, where he won the Price Cutter Charity Championship to graduate to the 2023 PGA Tour.

In his rookie PGA Tour season, he was runner-up at the 2023 Puerto Rico Open. He was back on the Korn Ferry Tour for the 2024 season, where he won twice, to again graduate to the PGA Tour for 2025, where he recorded a runner-up finish at the RSM Classic to keep his card.

== Amateur wins ==
- 2015 The Gopher Invitational
- 2016 Golf Club of Georgia Collegiate
- 2017 UTSA-Lone Star Invitational

== Professional wins (8) ==
=== Japan Golf Tour wins (1) ===
| No. | Date | Tournament | Winning score | To par | Margin of victory | Runners-up |
|---|---|---|---|---|---|---|
| 1 | Nov 17, 2024 | Dunlop Phoenix Tournament | 66-62-65-69=262 | −22 | 4 strokes | (United States) Akshay Bhatia, (Japan) Hideki Matsuyama, (South Africa) Shaun Norris |

=== Korn Ferry Tour wins (3) ===
| No. | Date | Tournament | Winning score | To par | Margin of victory | Runner(s)-up |
|---|---|---|---|---|---|---|
| 1 | Jul 26, 2020 | Price Cutter Charity Championship | 64-68-71-64=267 | −21 | 1 stroke | (Mexico) José de Jesús Rodríguez |
| 2 | Jun 30, 2024 | Memorial Health Championship | 63-66-62-69=260 | −24 | 1 stroke | (United States) Steven Fisk |
| 3 | Aug 18, 2024 | Magnit Championship | 65-67-69-69=270 | −18 | 3 strokes | (United States) Frankie Capan III, (United States) Ricky Castillo, (United States) Will Chandler, (Sweden) Tim Widing |

Korn Ferry Tour playoff record (0–1)

| No. | Year | Tournament | Opponent | Result |
|---|---|---|---|---|
| 1 | 2021 | Club Car Championship | (Canada) Adam Svensson | Lost to birdie on second extra hole |

=== PGA Tour China wins (1) ===
| No. | Date | Tournament | Winning score | To par | Margin of victory | Runner-up |
|---|---|---|---|---|---|---|
| 1 | Jul 21, 2019 | Guangzhou Open | 62-67=129 (Note: Shortened to 36 holes due to weather.) | −15 | 2 strokes | (United States) Trevor Sluman |

=== Other wins (3) ===
- 2017 Oklahoma Open
- 2019 Oklahoma Open
- 2024 TaylorMade Pebble Beach Invitational

== Results in major championships ==
| Tournament | 2025 | 2026 |
|---|---|---|
| Masters Tournament | | |
| PGA Championship | CUT | CUT |
| U.S. Open | | T32 |
| The Open Championship | | |

Did not play

CUT = missed the half-way cut
"T" = tied

== Results in The Players Championship ==
| Tournament | 2023 | 2024 | 2025 | 2026 |
|---|---|---|---|---|
| The Players Championship | CUT | | T20 | T50 |

Did not play

CUT = missed the half-way cut
"T" = tied

== See also ==
- 2021 Korn Ferry Tour Finals graduates
- 2024 Korn Ferry Tour graduates
