= Mexican Open (golf) =

National golf tournament of Mexico

Mexico Open

Tournament information
- Location: Vallarta, Mexico
- Established: 1944
- Course: Vidanta Vallarta
- Par: 71
- Length: 7,456 yards (6,818 m)
- Tours: PGA Tour; Web.com Tour; Challenge Tour; PGA Tour Latinoamérica; Tour de las Américas
- Format: Stroke play
- Prize fund: US$6,000,000
- Month played: October
- Website: mexicoopen.vidantaworld.com

Tournament record score
- Aggregate: 259 Andrew Novak (2026)
- To par: −25 as above

Current champion
- (United States) Andrew Novak

Location map
- Location in Mexico Location in Nayarit

The Mexican Open (Spanish: Abierto Mexicano de Golf), also known as the Mexico Open and Abierto Mexicano de Golf, is the national open golf tournament of Mexico.

== History ==
First played 82 years ago in 1944 at the Club de Golf Chapultepec, it was an event on the Tour de las Américas between 2003 and 2006, being co-sanctioned by the European Challenge Tour from 2004 to 2006. It became a Nationwide Tour event in 2008, and was rescheduled from December to January, which resulted in no tournament in 2007. Due to the outbreak of swine flu in 2009, the Mexican Open was rescheduled from May to September. In 2013, the tournament was moved to March and became an official event for PGA Tour Latinoamérica. The tournament was also moved to Club de Golf Mexico.

In 2022, the tournament became an official event on the PGA Tour, with a purse of $7,300,000 and awarding 500 FedEx Cup points to the winner.

The official name of the 2026 event is the VidantaWorld Mexico Open and will take place at the VidantaWorld course in Vallarta-Nuevo Nayarit, Mexico. The event will be held between October 29 – November 1, 2026 and feature a competitive field of 132 players competing for a purse of US$6,000,000 and 500 FedexCup Fall points. In advance of the competition, the course at Vallarta-Nuevo Nayarit, designed by Greg Norman, underwent an extensive program of improvements. Traditionally part of the PGA Tour early-season schedule, the Mexico Open was played in late April/early May during its first two PGA Tour seasons (2022–2023) and later in February (such as in 2025). For the 2026 season, the tournament was moved to a late October–early November time slot on the PGA Tour calendar. There were multiple reasons behind the move including coinciding the event with the grand opening of VidantaWorld Bon Theme Park, the launch of the Cirque du Soleil show "Ludo" at VidantaWorld and for cultural alignment with the Dia de Muertos, which takes place at the end of October.

== Winners ==
| Year | Tour(s) (Note: CHA − Challenge Tour; NWT/WEB − Nationwide Tour/Web.com Tour; PGAT − PGA Tour; PGATLA − PGA Tour Latinoamérica; TLA − Tour de las Américas.) | Winner | Score | To par | Margin of victory | Runner(s)-up | Venue |
VidantaWorld Mexico Open
| 2026 | PGAT | (United States) Andrew Novak | 259 | −25 | 5 strokes | (United States) Steven Fisk (Norway) Kristoffer Ventura | Vidanta Vallarta |
Mexico Open
| 2025 | PGAT | (United States) Brian Campbell | 264 | −20 | Playoff | (South Africa) Aldrich Potgieter | Vidanta Vallarta |
| 2024 | PGAT | (United States) Jake Knapp | 265 | −19 | 2 strokes | (Finland) Sami Välimäki | Vidanta Vallarta |
| 2023 | PGAT | (United States) Tony Finau | 260 | −24 | 3 strokes | (Spain) Jon Rahm | Vidanta Vallarta |
| 2022 | PGAT | (Spain) Jon Rahm | 267 | −17 | 1 stroke | (United States) Tony Finau (United States) Kurt Kitayama (United States) Brandon Wu | Vidanta Vallarta |
Abierto Mexicano de Golf
| 2021 | PGATLA | (Mexico) Álvaro Ortiz | 265 | −23 | 3 strokes | (Canada) Drew Nesbitt | Estrella del Mar |
| 2020 | PGATLA | No tournament due to the COVID-19 pandemic | | | | | |
| 2019 | PGATLA | (Canada) Drew Nesbitt | 263 | −17 | 2 strokes | (Norway) Andreas Halvorsen (Chile) Gustavo Silva | Tijuana |
| 2018 | PGATLA | (United States) Austin Smotherman | 262 | −18 | 4 strokes | (Mexico) Juan Pablo Hernández | Tijuana |
2017: No tournament
Mexico Open
| 2016 | PGATLA | (Mexico) Sebastián Vázquez | 268 | −16 | Playoff | (Argentina) Augusto Núñez | Aguascalientes |
| 2015 | PGATLA | (United States) Justin Hueber | 265 | −23 | 1 stroke | (United States) Brad Gehl (Argentina) Maximiliano Godoy | Aguascalientes |
TransAmerican Power Products CRV Mexico Open
| 2014 | PGATLA | (Colombia) Óscar David Álvarez | 271 | −17 | 1 stroke | (Argentina) Nelson Ledesma | Chapultepec |
Abierto Mexicano de Golf
| 2013 | PGATLA | (United States) Ted Purdy | 281 | −7 | 1 stroke | (Colombia) David Vanegas | Mexico |
Mexico Open
| 2012 | WEB | (United States) Lee Williams | 274 | −14 | 1 stroke | (United States) Paul Haley II | León |
| 2011 | NWT | (United States) Erik Compton | 271 | −17 | 2 strokes | (United States) Richard H. Lee | León |
Mexico Open Bicentenary
| 2010 | NWT | (United States) Jamie Lovemark | 276 | −12 | Playoff | (United States) B. J. Staten | León |
Mexico Open
| 2009 | NWT | (United States) Troy Merritt | 273 | −15 | Playoff | (Australia) Adam Bland | León |
| 2008 | NWT | (Australia) Jarrod Lyle | 267 | −17 | 4 strokes | (United States) Matt Every | Tres Marias |
2007: No tournament
Abierto Mexicano Corona
| 2006 | CHA, TLA | (Paraguay) Fabrizio Zanotti | 275 | −9 | 1 stroke | (Mexico) Daniel de León | La Hacienda |
| 2005 | CHA, TLA | (Mexico) Antonio Maldonado | 275 | −9 | 1 stroke | (France) Mickaël Dieu (Argentina) Rafael Gómez | La Hacienda |
Abierto Mexicano de Golf
| 2004 | CHA, TLA | (Argentina) Rafael Gómez | 270 | −14 | 2 strokes | (Colombia) Eduardo Herrera | La Hacienda |
Mexican Open
| 2003 | TLA | (Colombia) Eduardo Herrera | 278 | −10 | 1 stroke | (Argentina) Eduardo Argiró (United States) Jeff Burns | Moon Palace |
| 2002 | | (Mexico) Pablo Fernández | 273 | −11 | 1 stroke | (United States) David Howser | La Hacienda |
2001: No tournament
| 2000 | | (Mexico) Esteban Toledo | 271 | | | (United States) Robin Freeman | México |
| 1999 | | (United States) Stewart Cink (2) | 271 | | | (Mexico) Óscar Serna | México |
| 1998 | | (Argentina) Eduardo Romero | 269 | | | (United States) Scott Simpson | México |
| 1997 | | (New Zealand) Frank Nobilo | 273 | | | | México |
| 1996 | | (United States) Stewart Cink | 272 | | | (United States) Bob Tway | México |
| 1995 | | (United States) John Cook | 273 | | | (United States) Scott Verplank | México |
| 1994 | | (United States) Chris Perry | 274 | | | (United States) Bob Tway | México |
| 1993 | | (United States) Fred Funk | 268 | | 1 stroke | (United States) Donnie Hammond | La Hacienda |
| 1992 | | (United States) Tom Sieckmann | 268 | | | (Australia) Steve Elkington | La Hacienda |
| 1991 | | (United States) Jay Haas | 277 | | | (United States) Ed Fiori | Chapultepec |
| 1990 | | (United States) Bob Lohr | 269 | −19 | 4 strokes | (Mexico) Carlos Espinosa | La Hacienda |
1985–1989: No tournament
| 1984 | | (Canada) Danny Mijovic | 274 | | | (United States) Tommy Armour III (United States) Rick Cramer | Tijuana |
| 1983 | | (United States) Tommy Armour III | 280 | | | | Tijuana |
1982: No tournament
| 1981 | | (United States) Ben Crenshaw | 273 | | | (United States) Raymond Floyd | Chapultepec |
| 1980 | | (Australia) David Graham | 279 | | | (United States) Jerry Pate | Bellavista |
1978–79: No tournament
| 1977 | | (United States) Billy Casper | 274 | −6 | 3 strokes | (United States) Gay Brewer | Chiluca |
| 1976 | | (Mexico) Ernesto Pérez Acosta (2) | 273 | | | (Mexico) Victor Regalado | La Hacienda |
| 1975 | | (United States) Lee Trevino (2) | 275 | | | (Mexico) Ernesto Pérez Acosta (United States) Larry Ziegler | La Hacienda |
| 1974 | | (United States) Ed Byman | 280 | | | (United States) Lee Trevino | Chapultepec |
| 1973 | | (United States) Lee Trevino | 281 | | | (Mexico) Victor Regalado | Bellavista |
1972: No tournament
| 1971 | | (Spain) Ángel Gallardo | 275 | | | (United States) Billy Maxwell | México |
| 1970 | | (Mexico) Ernesto Pérez Acosta | 280 | | | | Bellavista |
1967–69: No tournament
| 1966 | | (United States) Bob McCallister | 278 | | | (United States) Dudley Wysong | Monterrey |
| 1965 | | (United States) Homero Blancas | 284 | | | (United States) Lee Trevino | Bellavista |
| 1964 | | (United States) Art Wall Jr. | 276 | | | (Argentina) Roberto De Vicenzo | México |
| 1963 | | (Canada) Al Balding | 279 | | | (United States) Richard Crawford (United States) Billy Maxwell | La Hacienda |
| 1962 | | (United States) Tony Lema (2) | 281 | | | (United States) Jackson Bradley | La Hacienda |
| 1961 | | (United States) Tony Lema | 280 | | | (Argentina) Antonio Cerdá | México |
| 1960 | | (United States) Howie Johnson | 273 | | | (United States) Billy Maxwell | Chapultepec |
| 1959 | | (Spain) Ángel Miguel | 273 | | | (United States) Tommy Jacobs | Chapultepec |
| 1958 | | (Argentina) Antonio Cerdá | 279 | | | (Argentina) Roberto De Vicenzo | Chapultepec |
| 1957 | | (United States) Bob Rosburg | 272 | | | (United States) George Bayer | Chapultepec |
| 1956 | | (United States) Billy Maxwell | 264 | | | (Argentina) Roberto De Vicenzo | Chapultepec |
| 1955 | | (Argentina) Roberto De Vicenzo (3) | 271 | | | (United States) Tony Holguin | Chapultepec |
| 1954 | | (United States) Johnny Palmer | 286 | | | (Argentina) Roberto De Vicenzo | México |
| 1953 | | (Argentina) Roberto De Vicenzo (2) | 267 | | | (United States) Cary Middlecoff | Chapultepec |
| 1952 | | (South Africa) Bobby Locke | 275 | | | (Argentina) Roberto De Vicenzo (United States) Jimmy Demaret | Mexicali |
| 1951 | | (Argentina) Roberto De Vicenzo | 267 | | | (United States) Al Besselink | Chapultepec |
| 1950 | | (United States) Tony Holguin (2) | 280 | | | (Mexico) Antonio Pedroza (Mexico) Juan Neri | Chapultepec |
| 1949 | | (United States) Tony Holguin | 200 | | | (United States) Jimmy Demaret (United States) Sam Snead | Chapultepec |
1948: No tournament
| 1947 | | (United States) Al Espinosa (4) | 292 | | | (Mexico) Carlos Belmont (a) (Mexico) Amado Martinez | Chapultepec |
| 1946 | | (United States) Al Espinosa (3) | 286 | | | (Mexico) Felix Lopez | Chapultepec |
| 1945 | | (United States) Al Espinosa (2) | 290 | | | (Mexico) Antonio Pedroza | Chapultepec |
| 1944 | | (United States) Al Espinosa | 281 | | | (United States) Percey Clifford (a) | Chapultepec |

== See also ==
- Open golf tournament
