= ISCO Championship =

Professional golf tournament on the PGA Tour

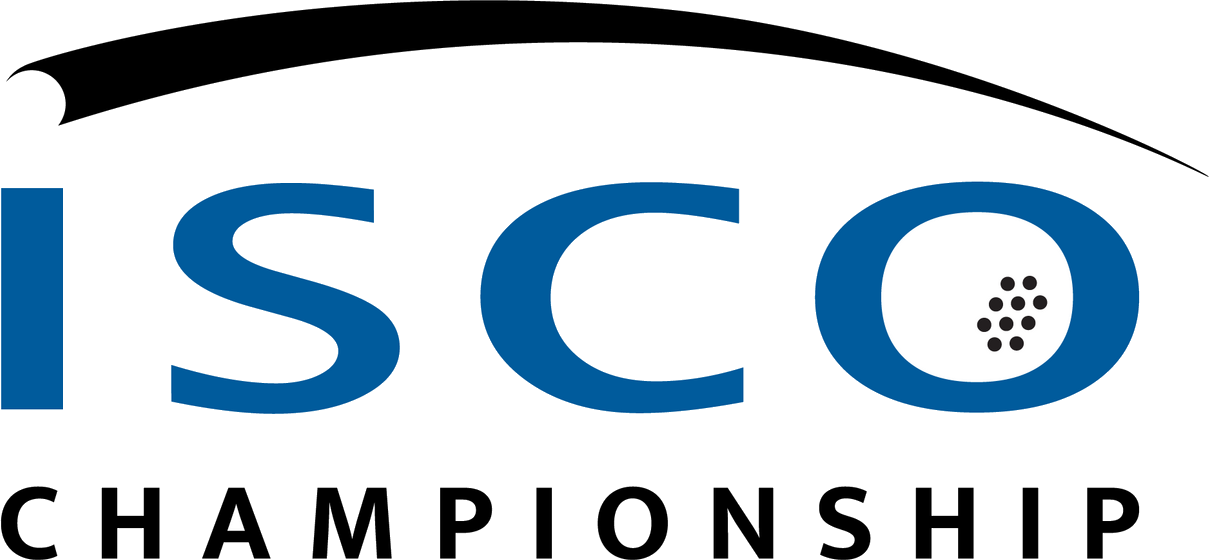

Tournament information
- Location: Louisville, Kentucky, U.S.
- Established: 2015
- Course: Hurstbourne Country Club
- Par: 72
- Length: 7,328 yards (6,701 m)
- Tours: PGA Tour (alternate event); European Tour
- Format: Stroke play
- Prize fund: US$4,000,000
- Month played: July
- Website: iscochampionship.com

Tournament record score
- Aggregate: 262 Jim Herman (2019)
- To par: −26 as above

Current champion
- (United States) Steven Fisk

Location map
- Location in the United States Location in Kentucky

The ISCO Championship is a professional golf tournament in Kentucky on the PGA Tour; it debuted in 2015 as the Barbasol Championship, an alternate event to the Scottish Open in July. The first three editions of the tournament were played in Alabama at the Grand National course of the Robert Trent Jones Golf Trail in Opelika, northeast of Auburn. It was the first PGA Tour event played in Alabama since the PGA Championship in 1990.

In 2018, the tournament moved to Kentucky to the Keene Trace Golf Club in Nicholasville, south of Lexington, and was the first PGA Tour event (excluding majors) in the state in 59 years, since the Kentucky Derby Open in 1959. (Valhalla Golf Club near Louisville has hosted four PGA Championships (1996, 2000, 2014, 2024)). In 2025, the tournament moved to Hurstbourne Country Club in Louisville.

Like other alternate events, the winner of the tournament does not earn an invitation to the Masters, but still receives a two-year PGA Tour exemption and a trip to the next PGA Championship.

In August 2021, it was announced that from 2022 onward, the event would become a co-sanctioned event with the European Tour, played the same week as an alternate event to the Scottish Open. It would also be an event that would give the leading non-exempt golfer entry into The Open Championship.

In its first year as the ISCO Championship, the 2024 edition set the record for the lowest 36-hole cut at a PGA Tour event at eight under par.

== Winners ==
Year	Tour(s) (Note: EUR − European Tour; PGAT − PGA Tour.)	Winner	Score	To par	Margin of victory	Runner(s)-up	Purse (US$)	Winner's share ($)
ISCO Championship
2026	EUR, PGAT	(United States) Steven Fisk	264	−16	Playoff	(Canada) Taylor Pendrith	4,000,000	720,000
2025	EUR, PGAT	(United States) William Mouw	270	−10	1 stroke	(United States) Paul Peterson	4,000,000	720,000
2024	EUR, PGAT	(England) Harry Hall	266	−22	Playoff	(United States) Zac Blair (United States) Pierceson Coody (Philippines) Rico Hoey (United States) Matthew NeSmith	4,000,000	720,000
Barbasol Championship
2023	EUR, PGAT	(Sweden) Vincent Norrman	266	−22	Playoff	(England) Nathan Kimsey	3,800,000	684,000
2022	EUR, PGAT	(United States) Trey Mullinax	263	−25	1 stroke	(United States) Kevin Streelman	3,700,000	666,000
2021	PGAT	(Republic of Ireland) Séamus Power	267	−21	Playoff	(United States) J. T. Poston	3,500,000	630,000
2020	PGAT	Canceled due to the COVID-19 pandemic						
2019	PGAT	(United States) Jim Herman	262	−26	1 stroke	(United States) Kelly Kraft	3,500,000	630,000
2018	PGAT	(United States) Troy Merritt	265	−23	1 stroke	(United States) Billy Horschel (United States) Tom Lovelady (United States) Richy Werenski	3,500,000	630,000
2017	PGAT	(United States) Grayson Murray	263	−21	1 stroke	(United States) Chad Collins	3,500,000	630,000
2016	PGAT	(Australia) Aaron Baddeley	266	−18	Playoff	(South Korea) Kim Si-woo	3,500,000	630,000
2015	PGAT	(United States) Scott Piercy	265	−19	3 strokes	(United States) Will Wilcox	3,500,000	630,000
