= Tim Widing =

Swedish professional golfer (born 1997)

Personal information
- Full name: Tim Alexander Widing
- Nationality: Sweden
- Born: 14 July 1997 (age 29) Jönköping, Sweden
- Height: 6 ft 1 in (185 cm)
- Weight: 168 lb (76 kg)
- Spouse: Jazmine

Career
- Sport: Golf
- College: University of San Francisco
- Turned professional: 2021
- Current tour: PGA Tour
- Former tours: Korn Ferry Tour; Challenge Tour; PGA Tour Latinoamérica
- Professional wins: 4

Number of wins by tour
- Korn Ferry Tour: 2
- Other: 2

Best results in major championships
- Masters Tournament: DNP
- PGA Championship: CUT: 2024
- U.S. Open: T41: 2024
- The Open Championship: DNP

Achievements and awards
- University of San Francisco Male Athlete of the Year: 2020

Tim Widing (born 14 July 1997) is a Swedish professional golfer and PGA Tour player. He won two tournaments in a row on the Korn Ferry Tour in April 2024, setting a new scoring record of 31-under-par 253 at the Veritex Bank Championship.

== Amateur career ==
Widing grew up in Jönköping, where he played for the A6 Golf Club since he was 13 years old. He had success as a junior and won several titles on the Teen Tour and in the Junior Masters Invitational series.

He appeared for the Sweden national team at the 2015 Junior Golf World Cup in Japan where the team secured the silver, behind the host nation. He also represented Sweden when the team earned the silver medal at the European Boys' Team Championship in 2015 lost to Italy. The achievement was repeated in 2016, but losing to Germany. He was a member of the Continental European Team in the 2015 Jacques Léglise Trophy contested against Great Britain and Ireland.

Widing accepted a scholarship to University of San Francisco and played with the San Francisco Dons golf team 2016–2021. He won three individual titles, and became only the second male student-athlete in USF history to earn first-team all-conference honors four times. As a senior, he was named All-American and crowned USF Male Athlete of the Year. He graduated with a degree in International business, and due to Q-School cancellation because of COVID, stayed on a fifth year to do a graduate degree in sports management.

Widing lost a playoff to Angus Flanagan in the Collegiate Showcase at the 2021 Genesis Invitational to lose out on a spot in field and his first PGA Tour start, but was later offered a sponsor's exemption after Andy Ogletree withdrew due to injury.

== Professional career ==
Widing turned professional in June 2021 and made seven starts on the European Challenge Tour over the summer. In his fourth start, he led the Euram Bank Open ahead the final round, but a bout of food poisoning following a bad pasta carbonara forced him to drop out of the tournament. A few weeks later, he also led the Made in Esbjerg Challenge after a five-under-par opening round of 66.

Widing joined the 2022 PGA Tour Latinoamérica after he finished second at the Q-School at Estrella del Mar in Mexico. His best finish was a tie for fifth at the Abierto del Centro, and he finished 33rd in the rankings to keep his status. In February, he won the Storyi Temecula Open on the Golden State Tour, and in December he finished solo third at the Argentina Classic.

Widing joined the 2023 Korn Ferry Tour after he finished tied 29th in the Final Stage of Q-School at the Landings Club in Savannah, Georgia. He recorded a career-low 54-hole score of 198 to hold a one stroke lead going into the final round of the Compliance Solutions Championship in Norman, Oklahoma, eventually finishing in a tie for 4th.

In April 2024, Widing won his first Korn Ferry Tour title at the LECOM Suncoast Classic at Lakewood National Golf Club in Florida, prevailing in a three-man playoff. The week after he won again, with a tour record, in relation to par, score of 31-under-par 253, at the Veritex Bank Championship at Texas Rangers GC in Arlington, Texas. With 33 birdies in the 72-hole tournament, he set a new record in the 34-year-history of the tour. With his two victories, Widing took a big lead on the points list, and ultimately graduated to the 2025 PGA Tour by finishing 5th in the season rankings.

Widing's Korn Ferry Tour wins earned him a special exemption into the 2024 PGA Championship, taking place the following month, his first major, and made his first cut in a major at the 2024 U.S. Open.

During the 2025 PGA Tour season, Widing entered 21 events, making the cut in five of them. His best finish was tied 24th, at the two-men team tournament Zurich Classic of New Orleans, teamed with Steven Fisk. His best individual finish in 2025 was tied 42nd at the Bank of Utah Championship in October. Widing finished the season 205th in the FedEx Cup rankings with $80,950 in official prize money and lost his playing rights on the PGA Tour.

== Amateur wins ==
- 2012 Skandia Tour Regional #3 - Halland
- 2013 Öijared Junior Open
- 2015 Skandia Tour Elit #5, Junior Masters Invitational, Skydda Junior Open
- 2016 Wilson Junior Open
- 2018 Seattle U Redhawk Invite
- 2020 Lamkin Grips SD Classic
- 2021 Ping Cougar Classic

== Professional wins (4) ==
=== Korn Ferry Tour wins (2) ===
No.	Date	Tournament	Winning score	Margin of victory	Runner(s)-up
1	21 Apr 2024	LECOM Suncoast Classic	−20 (67-64-67-66=264)	Playoff	(United States) Patrick Cover, (United States) Steven Fisk
2	28 Apr 2024	Veritex Bank Championship	−31 (62-63-65-63=253)	4 strokes	(Canada) Myles Creighton

Korn Ferry Tour playoff record (1–0)

No.	Year	Tournament	Opponents	Result
1	2024	LECOM Suncoast Classic	(United States) Patrick Cover, (United States) Steven Fisk	Won with par on second extra hole Cover eliminated by par on first hole

=== Golden State Tour wins (1) ===
No.	Date	Tournament	Winning score	Margin of victory	Runner-up
1	9 Feb 2022	Storyi Temecula Open	−15 (68-63-70=201)	2 strokes	(United States) Josh McCarthy

=== Other wins (1) ===
No.	Date	Tournament	Winning score	Margin of victory	Runner-up
1	7 Jul 2019	Wiredaholm Open	−6 (70-68=138)	4 strokes	(Sweden) Johan Bjerhag

== Results in major championships ==
Tournament	2024
Masters Tournament	
PGA Championship	CUT
U.S. Open	T41
The Open Championship	

Did not play

CUT = missed the half-way cut
"T" indicates a tie for a place

== Team appearances ==
Amateur

- European Young Masters (representing Sweden): 2013
- European Boys' Team Championship (representing Sweden): 2014, 2015
- Junior Golf World Cup (representing Sweden): 2015
- Jacques Léglise Trophy (representing Continental Europe): 2015
- Eisenhower Trophy (representing Sweden): 2018
- European Amateur Team Championship (representing Sweden): 2017, 2018

== See also ==
- 2024 Korn Ferry Tour graduates
