= Myrtle Beach Classic =

Golf tournament

Tournament information
- Location: Myrtle Beach, South Carolina
- Established: 2024
- Courses: Dunes Golf and Beach Club
- Par: 71
- Length: 7,347 yards (6,718 m)
- Tour: PGA Tour
- Format: Stroke play
- Prize fund: US$4,000,000
- Month played: May
- Website: myrtlebeachclassic.com

Tournament record score
- Aggregate: 262 Chris Gotterup (2024)
- To par: −22 as above

Current champion
- (United States) Brandt Snedeker

Location map
- Location in the United States Location in South Carolina

The Myrtle Beach Classic is a golf tournament on the PGA Tour. It is played at the Dunes Golf and Beach Club in the Myrtle Beach, South Carolina. It was first played in 2024.

== History ==
On May 10, 2023, the PGA Tour announced a four-year agreement with the Dunes Golf and Beach Club to debut the Myrtle Beach Classic in 2024.

On February 16, 2024, the PGA Tour announced that a select few golf YouTubers would be invited to play for an unrestricted sponsor exemption into the Myrtle Beach Classic. "The Q at Myrtle Beach" was held on March 4, 2024, at TPC Myrtle Beach and pitted 16 players, including eight YouTubers, against each other for a single spot. Matt Atkins won and was therefore invited to play in the Myrtle Beach Classic. He finished the tournament T46 with a final score of −6.

== Winners ==
Year	Winner	Score	To par	Margin of victory	Runners-up	Purse ($)	Winner's share ($)
Oneflight Myrtle Beach Classic
2026	(United States) Brandt Snedeker	266	−18	1 stroke	(United States) Mark Hubbard	4,000,000	720,000
2025	(New Zealand) Ryan Fox	269	−15	Playoff	(United States) Harry Higgs (Canada) Mackenzie Hughes	4,000,000	720,000
Myrtle Beach Classic
2024	(United States) Chris Gotterup	262	−22	6 strokes	(United States) Alistair Docherty (United States) Davis Thompson	4,000,000	720,000

== Highlights ==
2024: Thorbjørn Olesen broke the course record during the fourth round of the 2024 tournament with a score of 61 (−10).
