= Matt McCarty (golfer) =

American professional golfer (born 1997)

Personal information
- Nationality: United States
- Born: December 11, 1997 (age 28) Scottsdale, Arizona, U.S.
- Height: 6 ft 0 in (1.83 m)
- Weight: 165 lb (75 kg; 11.8 st)

Career
- Sport: Golf
- College: Santa Clara University
- Turned professional: 2021
- Current tour: PGA Tour
- Former tour: Korn Ferry Tour
- Professional wins: 5
- Highest ranking: 34 (January 25, 2026) (as of October 25, 2026)

Number of wins by tour
- PGA Tour: 1
- Korn Ferry Tour: 3
- Other: 1

Best results in major championships
- Masters Tournament: T14: 2025
- PGA Championship: CUT: 2025, 2026
- U.S. Open: CUT: 2022, 2025, 2026
- The Open Championship: CUT: 2025, 2026

Achievements and awards
- Korn Ferry Tour points list winner: 2024
- Korn Ferry Tour Player of the Year: 2024

Matt McCarty (born December 11, 1997) is an American professional golfer who currently plays on the PGA Tour. He joined in 2024 from the Korn Ferry Tour after becoming the 13th person to earn a three-win promotion. He plays left-handed.

== Amateur career ==
McCarty attended Santa Clara University between 2016 and 2021, majoring first in finance and then in marketing in graduate school. He earned three All-West Coast Conference honors three times and reached the quarterfinals at the 2019 U.S. Amateur Four-Ball together with teammate Derek Ackerman, after the duo finished at 13-under-par 128 in stroke play, best in the field.

== Professional career ==
McCarty turned professional in 2021 and played on the Forme Tour, where his best finish was a T5. He won the Wyoming State Open.

In 2022, McCarty joined the Korn Ferry Tour, where his best finishes were T5 at the 2022 Chitimacha Louisiana Open and T3 at the 2023 Bahamas Great Abaco Classic, before securing three victories in a six-week span in 2024 to earn his PGA Tour card. McCarty locked up the number one spot on the 2024 Korn Ferry Tour with one event left, fully exempt for the remainder of 2024 and all of 2025 and earning him exemptions into the 2025 Players Championship and 2025 U.S. Open. He was also awarded with Player of the Year honors.

In 2024, McCarty won his first PGA Tour title at the Black Desert Championship, finished at 23-under 261. It was McCarty's third career PGA Tour event and second as a member, his first being the 2022 U.S. Open. He is the second person, and first since Jason Gore in 2005, to earn a three-win promotion and PGA Tour win in the same season. Following the win, his exemption was extended to 2026 and also earned entry to the 2025 Sentry, Masters Tournament, and PGA Championship as a Tour winner. The win also moved McCarty into the top 50 of the Official World Golf Ranking.

== Amateur wins ==
- 2014 Arizona Junior Match Play Championship
- 2018 The Farms Invitational, Bayonet Amateur Championship

== Professional wins (5) ==
=== PGA Tour wins (1) ===
No.	Date	Tournament	Winning score	Margin of victory	Runner-up
1	Oct 13, 2024	Black Desert Championship	−23 (62-68-64-67=261)	3 strokes	(Germany) Stephan Jäger

=== Korn Ferry Tour wins (3) ===
Legend
Finals events (1)
Other Korn Ferry Tour (2)

No.	Date	Tournament	Winning score	Margin of victory	Runner(s)-up
1	Jul 21, 2024	Price Cutter Charity Championship	−25 (65-67-65-66=263)	3 strokes	(United States) Tommy Gainey
2	Aug 11, 2024	Pinnacle Bank Championship	−14 (69-67-67-67=270)	1 stroke	(United States) Danny Walker
3	Aug 25, 2024	Albertsons Boise Open	−21 (63-68-65-67=263)	2 strokes	(United States) William Mouw, (United States) Kevin Roy

=== Other wins (1) ===
- 2021 Wyoming State Open

== Results in major championships ==
Tournament	2022	2023	2024	2025	2026
Masters Tournament				T14	T24
PGA Championship				CUT	CUT
U.S. Open	CUT			CUT	CUT
The Open Championship				CUT	CUT

Did not play

CUT = missed the half-way cut
"T" indicates a tie for a place

== Results in The Players Championship ==
Tournament	2025	2026
The Players Championship	T20	CUT

CUT = missed the halfway cut
"T" = tied

== See also ==
- 2024 Korn Ferry Tour graduates
- List of golfers to achieve a three-win promotion from the Korn Ferry Tour
