= Paul Peterson (golfer) =

American professional golfer (born 1988)

Personal information
- Nationality: United States
- Born: July 1, 1988 (age 38) Tucson, Arizona, U.S.
- Height: 5 ft 10 in (1.78 m)

Career
- Sport: Golf
- College: Oregon State University
- Turned professional: 2012
- Current tours: Korn Ferry Tour; PGA Tour
- Former tours: European Tour; Japan Golf Tour; Asian Tour; Canadian Tour; Gateway Tour
- Professional wins: 5

Number of wins by tour
- European Tour: 1
- Japan Golf Tour: 1
- Asian Tour: 1
- Korn Ferry Tour: 1
- Other: 2

Paul Peterson (born July 1, 1988) is an American professional golfer. He has played on the European Tour, Korn Ferry Tour, Asian Tour, Japan Golf Tour and the Canadian Tour. His biggest wins have been in the 2016 D+D Real Czech Masters and the 2018 Leopalace21 Myanmar Open.

== Professional career ==
Peterson played on the Canadian Tour in 2012, making only two cuts in six events. In February 2014, Peterson was successful at the Asian Tour Qualifying School. In 2015, he finished in the top 10 of two joint events with the European Tour. This gave him 138th place in the European Tour rankings for 2015, earning him conditional status for 2016.

On August 21, 2016, Peterson won the D+D Real Czech Masters for his first European Tour victory. He was ranked 398th in the world prior to the victory. In January 2018, Peterson won the Myanmar Open, co-sanctioned by the Asian Tour and the Japan Golf Tour, by two strokes, which moved him up to 127th in the Official World Golf Ranking.

In September 2024, Peterson won his first event on the Korn Ferry Tour at the Simmons Bank Open, where he beat Matt Atkins by one stroke. This victory gave him enough points to secure his PGA Tour card for the 2025 season.

== Professional wins (5) ==
=== European Tour wins (1) ===
No.	Date	Tournament	Winning score	Margin of victory	Runner-up
1	Aug 21, 2016	D+D Real Czech Masters	−15 (72-70-64-67=273)	1 stroke	(Belgium) Thomas Pieters

=== Japan Golf Tour wins (1) ===
No.	Date	Tournament	Winning score	Margin of victory	Runners-up
1	Jan 28, 2018	Leopalace21 Myanmar Open^{1}	−13 (68-66-71-66=271)	2 strokes	(Japan) Tomoyo Ikemura, (Japan) Satoshi Kodaira

^{1}Co-sanctioned by the Asian Tour

=== Asian Tour wins (1) ===
No.	Date	Tournament	Winning score	Margin of victory	Runners-up
1	Jan 28, 2018	Leopalace21 Myanmar Open^{1}	−13 (68-66-71-66=271)	2 strokes	(Japan) Tomoyo Ikemura, (Japan) Satoshi Kodaira

^{1}Co-sanctioned by the Japan Golf Tour

=== Korn Ferry Tour wins (1) ===
Legend
Finals events (1)
Other Korn Ferry Tour (0)

No.	Date	Tournament	Winning score	Margin of victory	Runner-up
1	Sep 15, 2024	Simmons Bank Open	−20 (64-63-67-66=260)	1 stroke	(United States) Matt Atkins

=== Gateway Tour wins (1) ===
- 2015 Winter 2

=== Dakotas Tour wins (1) ===
- 2012 Western Printing Pro-Am

== See also ==
- 2024 Korn Ferry Tour graduates
