= Andrew Novak =

American professional golfer (born 1995)

Personal information
- Nationality: United States
- Born: March 31, 1995 (age 31) Raleigh, North Carolina, U.S.
- Height: 6 ft 2 in (1.88 m)
- Weight: 205 lb (93 kg)

Career
- Sport: Golf
- College: Wofford College
- Turned professional: 2017
- Current tour: PGA Tour
- Former tours: Korn Ferry Tour; PGA Tour Canada
- Professional wins: 4
- Highest ranking: 30 (August 17, 2025) (as of November 1, 2026)

Number of wins by tour
- PGA Tour: 2
- Korn Ferry Tour: 1
- Other: 1

Best results in major championships
- Masters Tournament: CUT: 2026
- PGA Championship: T26: 2026
- U.S. Open: T42: 2025
- The Open Championship: T63: 2025

Andrew Novak (born March 31, 1995) is an American professional golfer who currently plays on the PGA Tour. Novak graduated from Academic Magnet High School in North Charleston, South Carolina. He is also a graduate of Wofford College.

== Professional career ==
Andrew won the 2020 LECOM Suncoast Classic on the Korn Ferry Tour. Novak recorded his second top-10 finish on the PGA Tour at the 2023 RBC Canadian Open.

In April 2025, Novak tied for the lead at the RBC Heritage. He was defeated in a playoff by Justin Thomas. The following week, Novak paired with Ben Griffin at the Zurich Classic of New Orleans. Scoring 28-under-par, they won the event by one shot from Danish twins Nicolai and Rasmus Højgaard.

In November 2026, Novak won his first individual PGA Tour title at VidantaWorld Mexico Open, shooting −25, 5 strokes in front of the runners-up, Steven Fisk and Kristoffer Ventura.

== Professional wins (4) ==
=== PGA Tour wins (2) ===
No.	Date	Tournament	Winning score	Margin of victory	Runners-up
1	Apr 27, 2025	Zurich Classic of New Orleans (with (United States) Ben Griffin)	−28 (62-66-61-71=260)	1 stroke	(Denmark) Nicolai Højgaard and (Denmark) Rasmus Højgaard
2	Nov 1, 2026	VidantaWorld Mexico Open	−25 (67-61-62-69=259)	5 strokes	(United States) Steven Fisk, (Norway) Kristoffer Ventura

PGA Tour playoff record (0–1)

No.	Year	Tournament	Opponent	Result
1	2025	RBC Heritage	(United States) Justin Thomas	Lost to birdie on first extra hole

=== Korn Ferry Tour wins (1) ===
No.	Date	Tournament	Winning score	Margin of victory	Runner-up
1	Feb 16, 2020	LECOM Suncoast Classic	−23 (69-64-66-66=265)	1 stroke	(United States) John Chin

=== Other wins (1) ===
No.	Date	Tournament	Winning score	Margin of victory	Runners-up
1	Dec 14, 2025	Grant Thornton Invitational (with (United States) Lauren Coughlin)	−28 (57-68-63=188)	3 strokes	(United States) Michael Brennan and (England) Charley Hull, (United States) Chris Gotterup and (United States) Jennifer Kupcho, (United States) Nelly Korda and (United States) Denny McCarthy

== Results in major championships ==
Tournament	2022	2023	2024	2025	2026
Masters Tournament					CUT
PGA Championship				CUT	T26
U.S. Open	CUT			T42	CUT
The Open Championship				T63	CUT

Did not play

CUT = missed the half-way cut
"T" = tied

== Results in The Players Championship ==
Tournament	2023	2024	2025	2026
The Players Championship	CUT	CUT	CUT	CUT

CUT = missed the halfway cut

== See also ==
- 2021 Korn Ferry Tour Finals graduates
