= Aldrich Potgieter =

South African professional golfer (born 2004)

Personal information
- Nickname: Pottie
- Nationality: South Africa
- Born: 13 September 2004 (age 22) Pretoria, South Africa
- Height: 5 ft 11 in (180 cm)
- Weight: 211 lb (96 kg)

Career
- Sport: Golf
- Turned professional: 2023
- Current tour: PGA Tour
- Former tour: Korn Ferry Tour
- Professional wins: 2
- Highest ranking: 49 (29 June 2025) (as of 25 October 2026)

Number of wins by tour
- PGA Tour: 1
- Korn Ferry Tour: 1

Best results in major championships
- Masters Tournament: CUT: 2023, 2026
- PGA Championship: T35: 2026
- U.S. Open: 64th: 2023
- The Open Championship: T59: 2026

Achievements and awards
- PGA Tour Rookie of the Year: 2025

Aldrich Potgieter (English pronunciation: ALL-drick POT-gee-tur; born 13 September 2004) is a South African professional golfer who plays on the PGA Tour. At age 17, he won the 2022 Amateur Championship. He turned professional in 2023 and became the youngest winner in Korn Ferry Tour history by winning The Bahamas Great Abaco Classic in 2024, aged 19.

== Early life and amateur career ==
Potgieter was born in Pretoria, South Africa on 13 September 2004, to Adele and Heinrich Potgieter. His family speaks Afrikaans and he was raised in Mossel Bay. He started playing golf at an early age, attending the Louis Oosthuizen Junior Golf Academy in Mossel Bay. He moved to Perth, Western Australia at age eight with his family, where he attended Kingsway Christian College and was a part of their golf program. He returned to South Africa aged 17 as Australia's COVID-19 policies hindered his ability to compete in tournaments. Alongside golf, Potgieter competed in other sports such as rugby and wrestling during his childhood.

In 2020, Potgieter won the South Australian Junior Masters, winning by nine shots. He continued this form into 2021, where he won the Western Australian Amateur and finished second in the Australian Boys' Amateur. In 2022, Potgieter won both the Nomads South African Juniors International and the Nomads SA Boys U19 Championship.

Potgieter won The Amateur Championship in June 2022 at the age of 17, becoming the second-youngest winner in the history of the championship, behind Matteo Manassero who won in 2009 aged 16.

In February 2023, Potgieter won the African Amateur Stroke Play Championship, having previously finished tied-third at the event in 2022. Two months later, he won the Junior Invitational at Sage Valley, one of the top junior tournaments in the United States. Potgieter shot 13-under to win by 10 strokes, which set a record for largest margin of victory at the tournament.

Due to his win at the 2022 Amateur Championship, Potgieter qualified for the 2023 Masters Tournament, where he shot rounds of 77-74 to miss the cut. For the first two rounds, he was paired with Masters champion Charl Schwartzel, who said of Potgieter: "it's incredible how far the guy hits the ball. It's scary." Potgieter also qualified for the 2023 U.S. Open, held at Los Angeles Country Club in June. He was the only South African to make the cut, and ultimately finished 64th.

== Professional career ==
=== 2023–2024: Youngest winner on the Korn Ferry Tour ===
After competing in the U.S. Open in June 2023, Potgieter made his professional debut at the Korn Ferry Tour's Compliance Solutions Championship the following week, where he tied for 35th. During a Monday qualifier for the John Deere Classic on the PGA Tour in July, Potgieter made a hole in one on a 403-yard (369 m) par-4 as part of a 6-under 66, but he finished one shot outside the qualifying spots. Potgieter earned medalist honors at the second stage of PGA Tour Q-School in December 2023, which guaranteed him eight starts in the 2024 Korn Ferry Tour season.

Potgieter won The Bahamas Great Abaco Classic in January 2024 to become the youngest winner in Korn Ferry Tour history at 19 years, 133 days, breaking the record set by Jason Day in 2007 (19 years, 238 days). Two weeks later, Potgieter shot an 11-under 59 in the second round of the Astara Golf Championship. He followed with rounds of 73-71 on the weekend to finish tied-20th.

Despite a strong start, Potgieter struggled throughout the 2024 Korn Ferry Tour season, missing the cut in the majority of the tournaments he played. Entering the Korn Ferry Tour Championship in October at 27th in the points list, Potgieter shot a 77 in the third round and fell outside the projected top 30 ranking required to earn a PGA Tour card. A final-round 69 was enough to move him to 29th, securing promotion to the PGA Tour in 2025. Potgieter led the Korn Ferry Tour in driving distance during the 2024 season, averaging 336.5 yards (307.7 m).

In December 2024, Potigeter led by three strokes after 54 holes at the European Tour's Nedbank Golf Challenge, held at Gary Player Country Club in Sun City, South Africa. He shot a final-round 75 to finish tied-second, one shot behind Johannes Veerman.

=== 2025: First PGA Tour victory ===
Potgieter held the 54-hole lead at the Mexico Open on the PGA Tour in February 2025. He shot a final-round 71 to enter a playoff with Brian Campbell. On the second playoff hole, Campbell hit a tee shot that was veering out of bounds, but his ball hit a tree and bounced back into play. Campbell then birdied the hole to defeat Potgieter and claim the title.

In June, Potgieter held a two-stroke lead after 54 holes at the Rocket Classic. A final-round 69 saw him tie for first and enter a three-way playoff for the title. Potgieter made an 18-foot birdie putt on the fifth playoff hole to defeat Max Greyserman and claim his first PGA Tour victory. Chris Kirk, the third participant in the playoff, had been eliminated after making bogey on the second playoff hole. Aged 20 years, 289 days, Potgieter became the seventh-youngest PGA Tour winner since the start of 1983, and the youngest player from South Africa ever to win on the PGA Tour.

== Amateur wins ==
- 2020 South Australian Junior Masters
- 2021 Western Australian Amateur
- 2022 Nomads South African Juniors International, Nomads SA Boys U19 Championship, Western Province Amateur, The Amateur Championship
- 2023 African Amateur Stroke Play Championship, Junior Invitational at Sage Valley, Georgia Cup

== Professional wins (2) ==
=== PGA Tour wins (1) ===
No.	Date	Tournament	Winning score	Margin of victory	Runners-up
1	29 Jun 2025	Rocket Classic	−22 (62-70-65-69=266)	Playoff	(United States) Max Greyserman, (United States) Chris Kirk

PGA Tour playoff record (1–1)

No.	Year	Tournament	Opponent(s)	Result
1	2025	Mexico Open	(United States) Brian Campbell	Lost to birdie on second extra hole
2	2025	Rocket Classic	(United States) Max Greyserman, (United States) Chris Kirk	Won with birdie on fifth extra hole Kirk eliminated by par on second hole

=== Korn Ferry Tour wins (1) ===
No.	Date	Tournament	Winning score	Margin of victory	Runner-up
1	24 Jan 2024	The Bahamas Great Abaco Classic	−10 (72-70-71-65=278)	2 strokes	(United States) Quade Cummins

== Results in major championships ==
Tournament	2022	2023	2024	2025	2026
Masters Tournament		CUT			CUT
PGA Championship					T35
U.S. Open		64			
The Open Championship	CUT			CUT	T59

Did not play

CUT = missed the halfway cut
"T" indicates a tie for a place

== Results in The Players Championship ==
Tournament	2025	2026
The Players Championship	CUT	CUT

CUT = missed the half-way cut

== See also ==
- 2024 Korn Ferry Tour graduates
- Lowest rounds of golf
