= Brian Campbell (golfer) =

American professional golfer (born 1993)

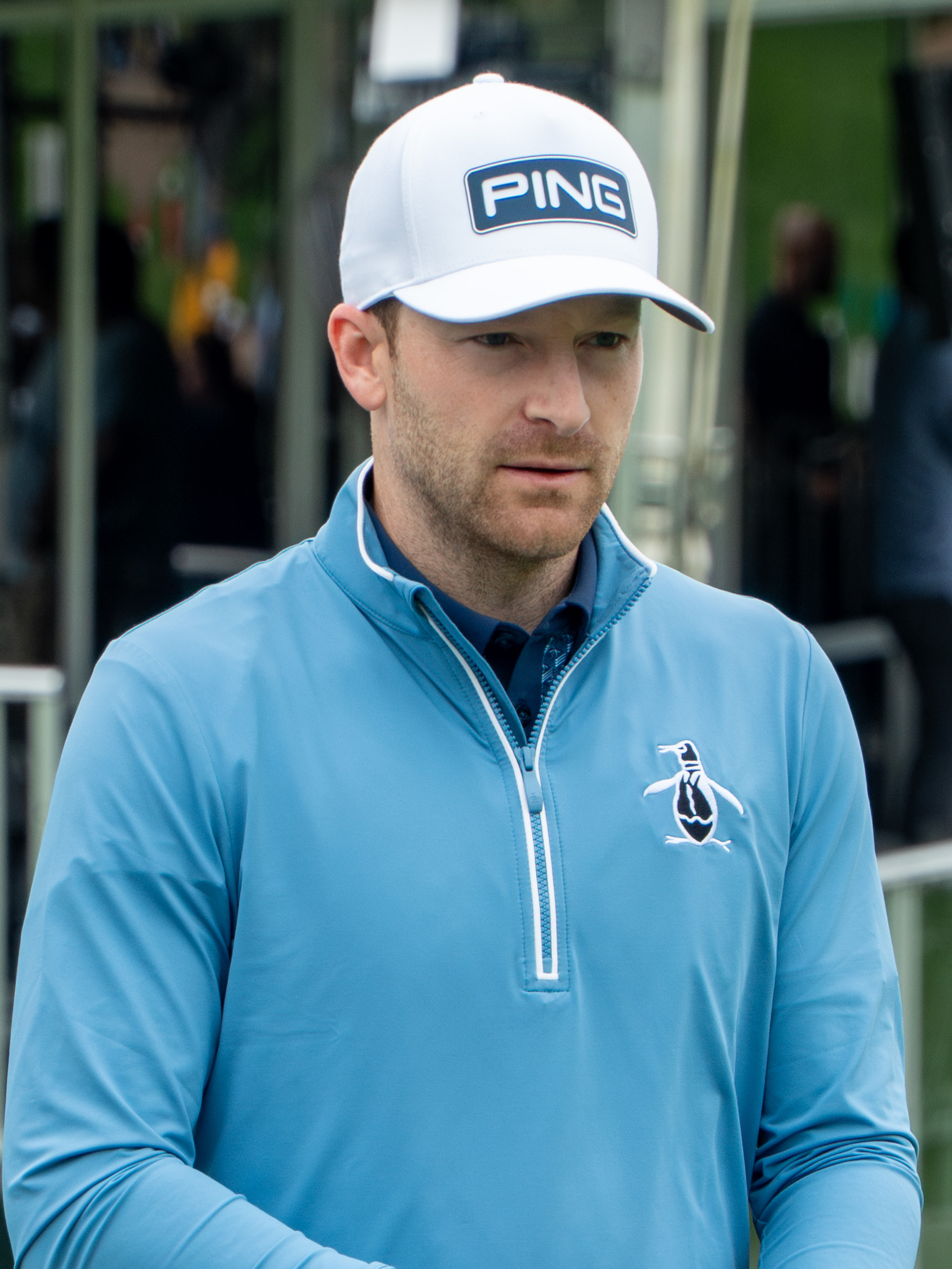
- Campbell at the 2025 Travelers Championship

Personal information
- Full name: Brian Patrick Campbell
- Nationality: United States
- Born: March 6, 1993 (age 33) Newport Beach, California, U.S.
- Height: 5 ft 10 in (178 cm)
- Weight: 160 lb (73 kg)

Career
- Sport: Golf
- College: University of Illinois
- Turned professional: 2015
- Current tour: PGA Tour
- Former tour: Korn Ferry Tour
- Professional wins: 2
- Highest ranking: 55 (July 6, 2025) (as of October 25, 2026)

Number of wins by tour
- PGA Tour: 2

Best results in major championships
- Masters Tournament: T24: 2026
- PGA Championship: T55: 2025
- U.S. Open: T27: 2015
- The Open Championship: CUT: 2025

Brian Patrick Campbell (born March 6, 1993) is an American professional golfer who plays on the PGA Tour, where he has won twice, the 2025 Mexico Open and 2025 John Deere Classic.

== Early life ==
Campbell was born in Newport Beach, California and was raised in Irvine. He attended Mater Dei High School. He grew up playing at Mesa Verde Country Club in Costa Mesa where his parents, Don and Kim, were members.

== Career ==
Campbell played college golf at the University of Illinois.

Campbell finished tied for 27th and was the low amateur at the 2015 U.S. Open. He made his professional debut two weeks later at the Nova Scotia Open on the Web.com Tour.

Campbell reached the PGA Tour for the first time in 2017, but did not do well enough to retain his tour card. He spent the next seven years battling injuries and trying to stay on the secondary tour. Prior to the 2023 Korn Ferry Tour Championship, Campbell was 75th on the Korn Ferry Tour points list, the last available position for full status. He returned to the PGA Tour after the 2024 season.

Campbell won his first professional tournament at the 2025 Mexico Open on the PGA Tour. He defeated Aldrich Potgieter in a sudden-death playoff. In July 2025, Campbell defeated Emiliano Grillo on the first playoff hole to win the John Deere Classic.

== Amateur wins ==
- 2010 ClubCorp Mission Hill Desert Junior
- 2013 The Macdonald Cup
- 2014 NCAA Sugar Grove Regional, Wolf Run Intercollegiate
- 2015 NCAA Noblesville Regional

== Professional wins (2) ==
=== PGA Tour wins (2) ===
No.	Date	Tournament	Winning score	To par	Margin of victory	Runner-up
1	Feb 23, 2025	Mexico Open	65-65-64-70=264	−20	Playoff	(South Africa) Aldrich Potgieter
2	Jul 6, 2025	John Deere Classic	65-66-68-67=266	−18	Playoff	(Argentina) Emiliano Grillo

PGA Tour playoff record (2–0)

No.	Year	Tournament	Opponent	Result
1	2025	Mexico Open	(South Africa) Aldrich Potgieter	Won with birdie on second extra hole
2	2025	John Deere Classic	(Argentina) Emiliano Grillo	Won with par on first extra hole

== Playoff record ==
Korn Ferry Tour playoff record (0–1)

No.	Year	Tournament	Opponent	Result
1	2024	Astara Golf Championship	(United States) Kevin Velo	Lost to birdie on first extra hole

== Results in major championships ==
Tournament	2014	2015	2016	2017	2018
Masters Tournament					
U.S. Open	CUT	T27LA			
The Open Championship					
PGA Championship					

Tournament	2019	2020	2021	2022	2023	2024	2025	2026
Masters Tournament							T32	T24
PGA Championship							T55	82
U.S. Open						T56	CUT	
The Open Championship		NT					CUT	

Did not play

LA = low amateur
CUT = missed the half-way cut
"T" indicates a tie for a place
NT = no tournament

== Results in The Players Championship ==
Tournament	2025	2026
The Players Championship	CUT	CUT

CUT = missed the half-way cut

== See also ==
- 2016 Web.com Tour Finals graduates
- 2024 Korn Ferry Tour graduates
