= 2024 Korn Ferry Tour =

Golf tour season

2024 Korn Ferry Tour season
- Duration: January 14, 2024 – October 6, 2024
- Number of official events: 26
- Most wins: (United States) Matt McCarty (3)
- Points list: (United States) Matt McCarty
- Player of the Year: (United States) Matt McCarty
- Rookie of the Year: (Australia) Karl Vilips

The 2024 Korn Ferry Tour was the 34th season of the Korn Ferry Tour, the official development tour to the PGA Tour.

== Changes for 2024 ==
As announced in July 2023, the Visa Argentina Open was added to the schedule for the first time.

== Schedule ==
The following table lists official events during the 2024 season.

Date	Tournament	Location	Purse (US$)	Winner (Note: The number in parentheses after each winner's name is the number of Korn Ferry Tour events they had won up to and including that tournament. This information is only shown for Korn Ferry Tour members. It is rare for someone to accumulate many wins on the Korn Ferry Tour as success at this level usually leads to promotion to the PGA Tour.)	OWGR points	Notes
Jan 17	The Bahamas Great Exuma Classic	Bahamas	1,000,000	(Germany) Jeremy Paul (1)	11.08	
Jan 24	The Bahamas Great Abaco Classic	Bahamas	1,000,000	(South Africa) Aldrich Potgieter (1)	11.86	
Feb 4	Panama Championship	Panama	1,000,000	(United States) Isaiah Salinda (1)	12.98	
Feb 11	Astara Golf Championship	Colombia	1,000,000	(United States) Kevin Velo (1)	13.97	
Mar 3	Visa Argentina Open	Argentina	1,000,000	(United States) Mason Andersen (1)	11.88	New to Korn Ferry Tour
Mar 10	Astara Chile Classic	Chile	1,000,000	(United States) Taylor Dickson (1)	11.75	
Apr 7	Club Car Championship	Georgia	1,000,000	(United States) Steven Fisk (1)	14.63	
Apr 21	LECOM Suncoast Classic	Florida	1,000,000	(Sweden) Tim Widing (1)	12.90	
Apr 28	Veritex Bank Championship	Texas	1,000,000	(Sweden) Tim Widing (2)	13.07	
May 19	AdventHealth Championship	Missouri	1,000,000	(United States) Harry Higgs (2)	14.34	
May 26	Visit Knoxville Open	Tennessee	1,000,000	(United States) Harry Higgs (3)	14.09	
Jun 2	UNC Health Championship	North Carolina	1,000,000	(Japan) Kaito Onishi (1)	12.82	
Jun 9	BMW Charity Pro-Am	South Carolina	1,000,000	(United States) Ryan Gerard (1)	13.16	Pro-Am
Jun 16	Blue Cross and Blue Shield of Kansas Wichita Open	Kansas	1,000,000	(United States) Taylor Dickson (2)	12.79	
Jun 23	Compliance Solutions Championship	Oklahoma	1,000,000	(United States) John Pak (1)	13.91	
Jun 30	Memorial Health Championship	Illinois	1,000,000	(United States) Max McGreevy (2)	12.72	
Jul 14	The Ascendant	Colorado	1,000,000	(Chile) Cristóbal del Solar (1)	13.21	
Jul 21	Price Cutter Charity Championship	Missouri	1,000,000	(United States) Matt McCarty (1)	13.52	
Jul 28	NV5 Invitational	Illinois	1,000,000	(Germany) Thomas Rosenmüller (1)	13.73	
Aug 4	Utah Championship	Utah	1,000,000	(Australia) Karl Vilips (1)	12.20	
Aug 11	Pinnacle Bank Championship	Nebraska	1,000,000	(United States) Matt McCarty (2)	14.02	
Aug 18	Magnit Championship	New Jersey	1,000,000	(United States) Max McGreevy (3)	14.31	
Aug 25	Albertsons Boise Open	Idaho	1,500,000	(United States) Matt McCarty (3) (Note: McCarty earned immediate promotion to the PGA Tour, as this was his third win of the season.)	14.52	Finals event
Sep 15	Simmons Bank Open	Tennessee	1,500,000	(United States) Paul Peterson (1)	13.84	Finals event
Sep 22	Nationwide Children's Hospital Championship	Ohio	1,500,000	(United States) Frankie Capan III (1)	12.83	Finals event
Oct 6	Korn Ferry Tour Championship	Indiana	1,500,000	(United States) Braden Thornberry (1)	11.34	Finals event

== Points list ==
The points list was based on tournament results during the season, calculated using a points-based system. The top 30 players on the points list earned status to play on the 2025 PGA Tour.

Position	Player	Points
1	(United States) Matt McCarty	2,703
2	(United States) Max McGreevy	2,149
3	(United States) Frankie Capan III	1,793
4	(United States) Steven Fisk	1,730
5	(Sweden) Tim Widing	1,709

== Awards ==
Award	Winner	Ref.
Player of the Year (Jack Nicklaus Trophy)	(United States) Matt McCarty	
Rookie of the Year	(Australia) Karl Vilips	
