= William Mouw =

American professional golfer (born 2000)

Personal information
- Nationality: United States
- Born: September 5, 2000 (age 26) Upland, California, U.S.
- Height: 6 ft 0 in (183 cm)
- Weight: 165 lb (75 kg)
- Spouse: Hannah

Career
- Sport: Golf
- College: Pepperdine University
- Turned professional: 2023
- Current tour: PGA Tour
- Former tour: Korn Ferry Tour
- Professional wins: 1
- Highest ranking: 98 (September 14, 2025) (as of October 25, 2026)

Number of wins by tour
- PGA Tour: 1
- European Tour: 1

Best results in major championships
- Masters Tournament: DNP
- PGA Championship: T70: 2026
- U.S. Open: T65: 2026
- The Open Championship: DNP

William Mouw (born September 5, 2000) is an American professional golfer who plays on the PGA Tour.

== Early life ==
Born in Upland, California, Mouw attended Ontario Christian High School in Ontario, California where he played on the varsity golf team for four years.

== Amateur career ==
Mouw played college golf at Pepperdine University where he was a four-time All-American. He won several non-collegiate events including the Western Junior, California State Amateur Championship, and Trans-Mississippi Amateur. He also played on several amateur U.S. national teams: 2017 Junior Presidents Cup, 2020 Arnold Palmer Cup, and 2021 Walker Cup.

== Professional career ==
Mouw turned professional in 2023 after graduating from Pepperdine. He played on the Korn Ferry Tour in 2023 and 2024. He had three runner-up finishes on the 2024 Korn Ferry Tour: Blue Cross and Blue Shield of Kansas Wichita Open, Nationwide Children's Hospital Championship, and Albertsons Boise Open. He finished 10th on the 2024 Korn Ferry Tour points list to earn a PGA Tour card for 2025.

In July 2025, Mouw won his first PGA Tour event at the ISCO Championship. He shot a final round 61 to turn a seven-stroke deficit into a one-stroke victory over Paul Peterson.

== Amateur wins ==
- 2017 Western Junior
- 2019 PING Heather Farr Classic, Thunderbird International Junior, California State Amateur Championship
- 2020 Amer Ari Invitational
- 2022 Trans-Mississippi Amateur

== Professional wins (1) ==
=== PGA Tour wins (1) ===
No.	Date	Tournament	Winning score	Margin of victory	Runners-up
1	Jul 13, 2025	ISCO Championship^{1}	−10 (67-73-69-61=270)	1 stroke	(United States) Paul Peterson

^{1}Co-sanctioned by the European Tour

== Results in major championships ==
Tournament	2022	2023	2024	2025	2026
Masters Tournament					
PGA Championship					T70
U.S. Open	CUT				T65
The Open Championship					

Did not play

CUT = missed the half-way cut
"T" = tied

== U.S. national team appearances ==
Amateur

- Junior Presidents Cup: 2017 (winners)
- Arnold Palmer Cup: 2020
- Walker Cup: 2021 (winners)

== See also ==
- 2024 Korn Ferry Tour graduates
