= Ryan Gerard =

American professional golfer (born 1999)

Personal information
- Nationality: United States
- Born: August 2, 1999 (age 27) Raleigh, North Carolina, U.S.
- Height: 6 ft 2 in (188 cm)
- Weight: 175 lb (79 kg)

Career
- Sport: Golf
- College: University of North Carolina at Chapel Hill
- Turned professional: 2022
- Current tours: PGA Tour; European Tour
- Former tours: Korn Ferry Tour; PGA Tour Canada
- Professional wins: 3
- Highest ranking: 22 (September 6, 2026) (as of October 25, 2026)

Number of wins by tour
- PGA Tour: 1
- European Tour: 1
- Korn Ferry Tour: 1
- Other: 1

Best results in major championships
- Masters Tournament: T38: 2026
- PGA Championship: T8: 2025
- U.S. Open: T50: 2025
- The Open Championship: T9: 2026

Ryan Gerard (born August 2, 1999) is an American professional golfer who plays on the PGA Tour. He won the 2024 BMW Charity Pro-Am on the Korn Ferry Tour en route to earning his full card for the 2025 PGA Tour season. He had previously spent the majority of the 2023 PGA Tour Season on the PGA Tour as a Special Temporary Member.

== Amateur career ==
As a high school student, Gerard attended Ravenscroft School, where he was a four-time NCISAA All-State honoree, and was named TISAC Player of the Year three times and TISAC All-Conference five times, while earning American Junior Golf Association All-American honors his senior season.

Gerard attended the University of North Carolina at Chapel Hill from 2017 to 2022, earning All-America Honors in 2020 and 2022, finishing fourth in school history with a 71.65 career stroke average, and shooting more career rounds (5) of 65 or better, than any other Tar Heel.

== Professional career ==
Gerard turned professional in 2022, competing on PGA Tour Canada, where he won the Quebec Open in his fourth start, and finished fifth in the season-long Fortinet Cup standings to earn Korn Ferry status for 2023.

However, after only four Korn Ferry Tour starts in 2023, he Monday qualified into the PGA Tour's Honda Classic and finished fourth, then placed 11th at the next week's Puerto Rico Open en route to securing PGA Tour Special Temporary Membership at the Valero Texas Open. Unfortunately, Gerard could not quite retain that form, notching just one further top-25 in 2023 (he made 22 PGA Tour starts overall), and failed to match the top-125 on the FedEx Cup (after the FedEx Cup Fall) required to earn 2024 Tour membership.

Despite missing out on earning full PGA Tour status for 2024, Gerard successfully earned a PGA Tour card for 2025 by finishing 12th on the Korn Ferry tour in the 2024 season, registering 12 top-25 finishes, four top-10s and a win at the BMW Charity Pro-Am, where he shot a 26-under 259, finishing six strokes ahead of runner-up Seth Reeves.

=== 2025 season ===
In his first full season on the PGA Tour, Gerard made nine of his first ten cuts of 2025. During that stretch, he finished in the top-25 five times, with two top-10s, including a runner-up finish at the Valero Texas Open, where he finished three strokes behind tournament-winner Brian Harman. Later on in the season, he earned his first PGA Tour win at the Barracuda Championship, posting a four-round score of 47 in the tournament's Modified Stableford format. In December, Gerard was ranked 57th in the Official World Golf Ranking heading into the final tournament week of the year. He opted to play in the AfrAsia Bank Mauritius Open, needing a top-four finish to reach the top-50 in the OWGR and secure an invitation to the 2026 Masters Tournament. Gerard finished runner-up in the event, losing in a playoff to Jayden Schaper.

== Amateur wins ==
- 2015 Midwest Junior Players Championship, Polo Golf Junior Classic
- 2021 Rod Meyers Invitational

== Professional wins (3) ==
=== PGA Tour wins (1) ===
No.	Date	Tournament	Winning score	Margin of victory	Runner-up
1	Jul 20, 2025	Barracuda Championship^{1}	47 pts (13-7-15-12=47)	3 points	(South Africa) Erik van Rooyen

^{1}Co-sanctioned by the European Tour

PGA Tour playoff record (0–1)

No.	Year	Tournament	Opponent	Result
1	2026	Memorial Tournament	(United States) J. T. Poston	Lost to par on second extra hole

=== European Tour wins (1) ===
No.	Date	Tournament	Winning score	Margin of victory	Runner-up
1	Jul 20, 2025	Barracuda Championship^{1}	47 pts (13-7-15-12=47)	3 points	(South Africa) Erik van Rooyen

^{1}Co-sanctioned by the PGA Tour

European Tour playoff record (0–1)

No.	Year	Tournament	Opponent	Result
1	2025	AfrAsia Bank Mauritius Open	(South Africa) Jayden Schaper	Lost to eagle on second extra hole

=== Korn Ferry Tour wins (1) ===
No.	Date	Tournament	Winning score	Margin of victory	Runner-up
1	Jun 9, 2024	BMW Charity Pro-Am	−26 (64-66-63-66=259)	6 strokes	(United States) Seth Reeves

=== PGA Tour Canada wins (1) ===
No.	Date	Tournament	Winning score	Margin of victory	Runner-up
1	Aug 7, 2022	Quebec Open	−16 (65-68-66-73=272)	1 stroke	(United States) Thomas Walsh

== Results in major championships ==
Tournament	2022	2023	2024	2025	2026
Masters Tournament					T38
PGA Championship				T8	T70
U.S. Open	CUT	T56		T50	CUT
The Open Championship					T9

Top 10
Did not play

CUT = missed the half-way cut
"T" = tied

=== Summary ===
Tournament	Wins	2nd	3rd	Top-5	Top-10	Top-25	Events	Cuts made
Masters Tournament	0	0	0	0	0	0	1	1
PGA Championship	0	0	0	0	1	1	2	2
U.S. Open	0	0	0	0	0	0	4	2
The Open Championship	0	0	0	0	1	1	1	1
Totals	0	0	0	0	2	2	8	6

- Most consecutive cuts made – 5 (2023 U.S. Open – 2026 PGA Championship)
- Longest streak of top-10s – 1 (twice, current)

== See also ==
- 2024 Korn Ferry Tour graduates
