= Steven Fisk =

American professional golfer (born 1997)

Personal information
- Full name: Steven Christopher Fisk
- Nationality: United States
- Born: April 17, 1997 (age 29) Atlanta, Georgia, U.S.
- Height: 5 ft 10 in (178 cm)
- Weight: 175 lb (79 kg)
- Spouse: Edith

Career
- Sport: Golf
- College: Georgia Southern University
- Turned professional: 2019
- Current tour: PGA Tour
- Former tours: Korn Ferry Tour; PGA Tour Canada
- Professional wins: 3
- Highest ranking: 75 (October 4, 2026) (as of October 25, 2026)

Number of wins by tour
- PGA Tour: 2
- European Tour: 1
- Korn Ferry Tour: 1

Best results in major championships
- Masters Tournament: DNP
- PGA Championship: CUT: 2026
- U.S. Open: DNP
- The Open Championship: DNP

Steven Christopher Fisk (born April 17, 1997) is an American professional golfer. He won his first PGA Tour event at the 2025 Sanderson Farms Championship.

== Early life and amateur career ==
Fisk was born in Atlanta, Georgia in 1997. He played college golf at Georgia Southern University where he won nine times including four consecutive tournaments in 2018. He finished second individually at the 2019 NCAA golf championship and played on the winning 2019 Walker Cup tteam.

== Professional career ==
Fisk turned professional in 2019. He played on the PGA Tour Canada in 2021 where he had one top-10 finish. He played on the Korn Ferry Tour from 2022 to 2024, winning once at the 2024 Club Car Championship. By finishing fourth on the 2024 Korn Ferry Tour points list, he earned his 2025 PGA Tour card. He picked up his first PGA Tour win in October at the Sanderson Farms Championship. In July 2026, Fisk won the ISCO Championship with a par on the third playoff hole against Taylor Pendrith.

== Amateur wins ==
- 2017 Sun Belt Conference Championship, Fighting Irish Classic, Autotrader Collegiate Classic
- 2018 Shoal Creek Intercollegiate, Hummingbird Intercollegiate, Fighting Irish Classic, AutoTrader Collegiate Classic
- 2019 Schenkel InvitationalSun Belt Conference Championship

== Professional wins (3) ==
=== PGA Tour wins (2) ===
No.	Date	Tournament	Winning score	Margin of victory	Runner-up
1	Oct 5, 2025	Sanderson Farms Championship	−24 (70-65-65-64=264)	2 strokes	(South Africa) Garrick Higgo
2	Jul 12, 2026	ISCO Championship^{1}	−16 (63-66-68-67=264)	Playoff	(Canada) Taylor Pendrith

^{1}Co-sanctioned by the European Tour

PGA Tour playoff record (1–0)

No.	Year	Tournament	Opponent	Result
1	2026	ISCO Championship	(Canada) Taylor Pendrith	Won with par on third extra hole

=== Korn Ferry Tour wins (1) ===
No.	Date	Tournament	Winning score	Margin of victory	Runner-up
1	Apr 7, 2024	Club Car Championship	−14 (70-65-61-68=274)	Playoff	(United States) Rob Oppenheim

Korn Ferry Tour playoff record (1–1)

No.	Year	Tournament	Opponent(s)	Result
1	2024	Club Car Championship	(United States) Rob Oppenheim	Won with par on first extra hole
2	2024	LECOM Suncoast Classic	(United States) Patrick Cover, (Sweden) Tim Widing	Widing won with par on second extra hole Cover eliminated by par on first hole

== Results in major championships ==
Tournament	2026
Masters Tournament	
PGA Championship	CUT
U.S. Open	
The Open Championship	

Did not play

CUT = missed the half-way cut
T = tied

== U.S. national team appearances ==
- Walker Cup: 2019 (winners)

== See also ==
- 2024 Korn Ferry Tour graduates
