= 2025 PGA Tour =

Golf tour season

2025 PGA Tour season
- Duration: January 2, 2025 – November 23, 2025
- Number of official events: 46
- Most wins: (United States) Scottie Scheffler (6)
- FedEx Cup: (England) Tommy Fleetwood
- Money list: (United States) Scottie Scheffler
- Player of the Year: (United States) Scottie Scheffler
- Rookie of the Year: (South Africa) Aldrich Potgieter

The 2025 PGA Tour was the 110th season of the PGA Tour, the main professional golf tour in the United States. It was also the 57th season since separating from the PGA of America, and the 19th edition of the FedEx Cup.

== Changes for 2025 ==
In May 2025, the PGA Tour announced updates to the format of the season-ending Tour Championship. Beginning this year, starting strokes, first introduced for the 2018–19 season, will be eliminated, with the tournament now being played as a regular 72-hole stroke-play event, with all players starting the tournament at even par.

The eligibility categories also changed. The top 70 would be exempt for the FedEx Cup, with those up to 100th retaining full status (down from 125th), and conditional up to 125th (down from 150th).

== Schedule ==
The following table lists official events during the 2025 season.

| Date | Tournament | Location | Purse (US$) | Winner(s) (Note: The number in parentheses after each winner's name is the number of PGA Tour events they had won up to and including that tournament. This information is only shown for PGA Tour members.) | OWGR points | Other tours (Note: EUR − European Tour; JPN − Japan Golf Tour.) | Notes |
|---|---|---|---|---|---|---|---|
| Jan 5 | The Sentry | Hawaii | 20,000,000 | (Japan) Hideki Matsuyama (11) | 51.94 | | Signature event |
| Jan 12 | Sony Open in Hawaii | Hawaii | 8,700,000 | (Canada) Nick Taylor (5) | 49.21 | | |
| Jan 19 | The American Express | California | 8,800,000 | (Austria) Sepp Straka (3) | 50.69 | | |
| Jan 25 | Farmers Insurance Open | California | 9,300,000 | (United States) Harris English (5) | 48.68 | | |
| Feb 2 | AT&T Pebble Beach Pro-Am | California | 20,000,000 | (Northern Ireland) Rory McIlroy (27) | 71.62 | | Signature event |
| Feb 9 | WM Phoenix Open | Arizona | 9,200,000 | (Belgium) Thomas Detry (1) | 59.34 | | |
| Feb 16 | Genesis Invitational | California (Note: On January 16, the PGA Tour announced the Genesis Invitational would be moved from Riviera Country Club in Pacific Palisades, California, to a venue to be determined because of the January 2025 Southern California wildfires. On January 24, it was announced that Torrey Pines Golf Course in San Diego would host the tournament.) | 20,000,000 | (Sweden) Ludvig Åberg (2) | 68.46 | | Signature event |
| Feb 23 | Mexico Open | Mexico | 7,000,000 | (United States) Brian Campbell (1) | 31.68 | | |
| Mar 2 | Cognizant Classic | Florida | 9,200,000 | (United States) Joe Highsmith (1) | 48.97 | | |
| Mar 9 | Arnold Palmer Invitational | Florida | 20,000,000 | (United States) Russell Henley (5) | 70.53 | | Signature event |
| Mar 9 | Puerto Rico Open | Puerto Rico | 4,000,000 | (Australia) Karl Vilips (1) | 20.23 | | Additional event |
| Mar 17 | The Players Championship | Florida | 25,000,000 | (Northern Ireland) Rory McIlroy (28) | 80 | | Flagship event |
| Mar 23 | Valspar Championship | Florida | 8,700,000 | (Norway) Viktor Hovland (7) | 55.38 | | |
| Mar 30 | Texas Children's Houston Open | Texas | 9,500,000 | (Australia) Min Woo Lee (1) | 53.45 | | |
| Apr 6 | Valero Texas Open | Texas | 9,500,000 | (United States) Brian Harman (4) | 48.89 | | |
| Apr 13 | Masters Tournament | Georgia | 21,000,000 | (Northern Ireland) Rory McIlroy (29) | 100 | | Major championship |
| Apr 20 | RBC Heritage | South Carolina | 20,000,000 | (United States) Justin Thomas (16) | 65.11 | | Signature event |
| Apr 20 | Corales Puntacana Championship | Dominican Republic | 4,000,000 | (South Africa) Garrick Higgo (2) | 22.50 | | Additional event |
| Apr 27 | Zurich Classic of New Orleans | Louisiana | 9,200,000 | (United States) Ben Griffin (1) and (United States) Andrew Novak (1) | n/a | | Team event |
| May 4 | CJ Cup Byron Nelson | Texas | 9,900,000 | (United States) Scottie Scheffler (14) | 46.18 | | |
| May 11 | Truist Championship | Pennsylvania | 20,000,000 | (Austria) Sepp Straka (4) | 64.82 | | Signature event |
| May 11 | Oneflight Myrtle Beach Classic | South Carolina | 4,000,000 | (New Zealand) Ryan Fox (1) | 27.73 | | Additional event |
| May 18 | PGA Championship | North Carolina | 19,000,000 | (United States) Scottie Scheffler (15) | 100 | | Major championship |
| May 25 | Charles Schwab Challenge | Texas | 9,500,000 | (United States) Ben Griffin (2) | 53.10 | | Invitational |
| Jun 1 | Memorial Tournament | Ohio | 20,000,000 | (United States) Scottie Scheffler (16) | 66.55 | | Signature event |
| Jun 8 | RBC Canadian Open | Canada | 9,800,000 | (New Zealand) Ryan Fox (2) | 47.12 | | |
| Jun 15 | U.S. Open | Pennsylvania | 21,500,000 | (United States) J. J. Spaun (2) | 100 | | Major championship |
| Jun 22 | Travelers Championship | Connecticut | 20,000,000 | (United States) Keegan Bradley (8) | 69.81 | | Signature event |
| Jun 29 | Rocket Classic | Michigan | 9,600,000 | (South Africa) Aldrich Potgieter (1) | 49.43 | | |
| Jul 6 | John Deere Classic | Illinois | 8,400,000 | (United States) Brian Campbell (2) | 43.77 | | |
| Jul 13 | Genesis Scottish Open | Scotland | 9,000,000 | (United States) Chris Gotterup (2) | 69.65 | EUR (Note: European Tour Rolex Series) | |
| Jul 13 | ISCO Championship | Kentucky | 4,000,000 | (United States) William Mouw (1) | 24.28 | EUR | Additional event |
| Jul 20 | The Open Championship | Northern Ireland | 17,000,000 | (United States) Scottie Scheffler (17) | 100 | | Major championship |
| Jul 20 | Barracuda Championship | California | 4,000,000 | (United States) Ryan Gerard (1) | 28.23 | EUR | Additional event |
| Jul 27 | 3M Open | Minnesota | 8,400,000 | (United States) Kurt Kitayama (2) | 47.36 | | |
| Aug 3 | Wyndham Championship | North Carolina | 8,200,000 | (United States) Cameron Young (1) | 55.63 | | |
| Aug 10 | FedEx St. Jude Championship | Tennessee | 20,000,000 | (England) Justin Rose (12) | 64.56 | | FedEx Cup playoff event |
| Aug 17 | BMW Championship | Maryland | 20,000,000 | (United States) Scottie Scheffler (18) | 56.43 | | FedEx Cup playoff event |
| Aug 24 | Tour Championship | Georgia | 40,000,000 | (England) Tommy Fleetwood (1) | 45.04 | | FedEx Cup playoff event |
| Sep 14 | Procore Championship | California | 6,000,000 | (United States) Scottie Scheffler (19) | 46.82 | | FedEx Cup Fall |
| Oct 5 | Sanderson Farms Championship | Mississippi | 6,000,000 | (United States) Steven Fisk (1) | 35.61 | | FedEx Cup Fall |
| Oct 12 | Baycurrent Classic | Japan | 8,000,000 | (United States) Xander Schauffele (10) | 38.61 | JPN (Note: Japan Golf Tour unofficial event) | FedEx Cup Fall |
| Oct 26 | Bank of Utah Championship | Utah | 6,000,000 | (United States) Michael Brennan (1) | 33.60 | | FedEx Cup Fall |
| Nov 9 | World Wide Technology Championship | Mexico | 6,000,000 | (United States) Ben Griffin (3) | 32.47 | | FedEx Cup Fall |
| Nov 16 | Butterfield Bermuda Championship | Bermuda | 6,000,000 | (United States) Adam Schenk (1) | 26.09 | | FedEx Cup Fall |
| Nov 23 | RSM Classic | Georgia | 7,000,000 | (Finland) Sami Välimäki (1) | 39.11 | | FedEx Cup Fall |

=== Unofficial events ===
The following events are sanctioned by the PGA Tour, but do not carry FedEx Cup points or official money, nor are wins official.

| Date | Tournament | Location | Purse ($) | Winner(s) | OWGR points | Notes |
|---|---|---|---|---|---|---|
| Sep 28 | Ryder Cup | New York | n/a | Team Europe | n/a | Team event |
| Nov 28 | TMRW Skins Game | Florida | 4,000,000 | (United States) Keegan Bradley | n/a | Limited-field event |
| Dec 7 | Hero World Challenge | Bahamas | 5,000,000 | (Japan) Hideki Matsuyama | 30.31 | Limited-field event |
| Dec 14 | Grant Thornton Invitational | Florida | 4,000,000 | (United States) Lauren Coughlin and (United States) Andrew Novak | n/a | Team event |
| Dec 21 | PNC Championship | Florida | 1,085,000 | (United States) Matt Kuchar and son Cameron Kuchar | n/a | Team event |

== FedEx Cup ==
=== Points distribution ===
The distribution of points for 2025 PGA Tour events are as follows:

| Finishing position | 1st | 2nd | 3rd | 4th | 5th | 6th | 7th | 8th | 9th | 10th | 20th | 30th | 40th | 50th | 60th |
|---|---|---|---|---|---|---|---|---|---|---|---|---|---|---|---|
| Majors & Players Championship | 750 | 500 | 350 | 325 | 300 | 275 | 250 | 225 | 200 | 175 | 60 | 37 | 22 | 14.25 | 9 |
| Signature events | 700 | 400 | 350 | 325 | 300 | 275 | 250 | 225 | 175 | 150 | 55 | 32.5 | 20.25 | 13 | 8.25 |
| Other PGA Tour events | 500 | 300 | 190 | 135 | 110 | 100 | 90 | 85 | 80 | 75 | 45 | 28 | 16 | 8.5 | 5 |
| Team event (each player) | 400 | 162.5 | 105 | 87.5 | 77.5 | 67.5 | 58.5 | 54 | 50 | 46 | 16.5 | 5.1 | 2.5 | – | – |
| Additional events | 300 | 165 | 105 | 80 | 65 | 60 | 55 | 50 | 45 | 40 | 28 | 17.42 | 9.96 | 5.29 | 3.11 |
| Playoff events | 2,000 | 1,200 | 760 | 540 | 440 | 400 | 360 | 340 | 320 | 300 | 180 | 112 | 64 | 34 | 20 |

=== Standings ===
Final FedEx Cup standings of the 30 qualifiers for the Tour Championship:

| Pos. | Player | | Majors & The Players | | | | | Signature events | | | | | | | | Top 10s in other PGA Tour events | | | | | Regular season points | Playoffs (Note: The top 70 point scorers in the regular season retain their tour card for the following season, and qualify for the FedEx St. Jude Championship. The top 50 points scorers after FedEx St. Jude Championship qualify for the BMW Championship.) | | Total points | Tour C'ship (Note: The top 30 point scorers after the BMW Championship qualify for the Tour Championship. The player who scored the lowest in the Tour Championship won the FedEx Cup.) | Tmts | Money ($m) (Note: In addition to tournament prize money, the top ten regular season point scorers receive a share of a $40m bonus, and the $100m FedEx Cup postseason bonus money is distributed based upon standings after the Tour Championship.) | | |
| Pos. | Nat. | Name | Ply | Mas | PGA | USO | Opn | Sen | PB | Gen | API | Htg | Tru | Mem | Trav | 1 | 2 | 3 | 4 | 5 | Regular season points | FStJ | BMW | Total points | Tour C'ship | Tmts | Basic | CB Top10 | FedEx Bonus |
|---|---|---|---|---|---|---|---|---|---|---|---|---|---|---|---|---|---|---|---|---|---|---|---|---|---|---|---|---|---|
| 1 | (England) | Fleetwood | T14 | T21 | T41 | CUT | T16 | • | T22 | T5 | T11 | 7 | T4 | T16 | T2 | T4 | | | | | 1,783 | T3 | T4 | 2,923 | −18 | 19 | 18.50 | 2.75 | 12.00 |
| T2 | (United States) | Cantlay | T12 | T36 | CUT | CUT | CUT | T15 | T33 | T5 | T31 | T13 | T4 | T12 | T12 | T5 | | | | | 1,275 | T9 | T30 | 1,661 | −15 | 19 | 9.44 | | 4.62 |
| T2 | (United States) | Henley | T30 | CUT | CUT | T10 | T10 | T30 | T5 | T39 | 1 | T8 | T46 | T5 | T2 | T10 | T6 | | | | 2,391 | T17 | T15 | 2,795 | −15 | 17 | 14.71 | 5.40 | 6.05 |
| T4 | (Canada) | Conners | T6 | T8 | T19 | WD | T10 | T5 | T65 | T24 | 3 | T49 | T11 | T25 | • | T8 | | | | | 1,620 | T9 | T30 | 1,719 | −14 | 21 | 8.17 | | 2.89 |
| T4 | (United States) | Scheffler | T20 | 4 | 1 | T7 | 1 | • | T9 | T3 | T11 | T8 | • | 1 | T6 | T2 | 1 | T4 | T8 | | 4,806 | T3 | 1 | 7,456 | −14 | 19 | 27.66 | 18.00 | 17.62 |
| T4 | (United States) | Cam. Young | T61 | CUT | T47 | T4 | CUT | T8 | 72 | CUT | CUT | T54 | T7 | T25 | T52 | T4 | 1 | | | | 1,464 | 5 | 11 | 2,184 | −14 | 24 | 8.79 | | 2.97 |
| T7 | (United States) | Bradley | T20 | CUT | T8 | T33 | T30 | T15 | T65 | T34 | T5 | T18 | T18 | T7 | 1 | T8 | | | | | 1,749 | T44 | T17 | 1,992 | −13 | 21 | 8.70 | 2.50 | 1.91 |
| T7 | (United States) | Burns | CUT | T46 | T19 | T7 | T45 | T8 | T22 | T24 | T48 | T13 | T30 | T12 | T17 | T5 | 2 | | | | 1,266 | T28 | T4 | 1,871 | −13 | 24 | 6.80 | | 1.41 |
| T7 | (United States) | Thomas | T33 | T36 | CUT | CUT | T34 | T26 | T48 | T9 | T36 | 1 | T2 | T31 | T9 | 2 | T6 | 2 | | | 2,280 | T28 | T33 | 2,477 | −13 | 20 | 10.90 | 4.80 | 2.29 |
| T10 | (United States) | Gotterup | CUT | • | • | T23 | 3 | T46 | • | • | • | • | • | • | • | 1 | T10 | | | | 1,306 | T54 | T33 | 1,414 | −12 | 27 | 4.84 | | 0.92 |
| T10 | (United States) | B. Griffin | CUT | • | T8 | T10 | CUT | • | T69 | T44 | T45 | • | T46 | 2 | T14 | T7 | T4 | T4 | 1 | 1 | 2,275 | T9 | T12 | 2,798 | −12 | 28 | 11.72 | 4.10 | 2.32 |
| 12 | (Norway) | Hovland | CUT | T21 | T28 | 3 | T63 | T36 | T22 | CUT | CUT | T13 | T54 | T25 | WD | 1 | | | | | 1,210 | T32 | T7 | 1,637 | −11 | 18 | 5.82 | | 0.90 |
| T13 | (United States) | Bhatia | T3 | T42 | CUT | CUT | T30 | T32 | T22 | T9 | CUT | T42 | T46 | T16 | T54 | 9 | | | | | 909 | T6 | T26 | 1,409 | −10 | 24 | 4.88 | | 0.77 |
| T13 | (United States) | English | T30 | T12 | T2 | T59 | 2 | • | T73 | T24 | CUT | T66 | T11 | T12 | T4 | 1 | | | | | 2,232 | T9 | T12 | 2,512 | −10 | 21 | 8.84 | 3.45 | 1.60 |
| T13 | (United States) | Harman | CUT | T36 | T60 | T59 | T10 | 58 | T53 | T17 | T40 | T3 | T46 | CUT | 8 | 1 | | | | | 1,413 | T22 | T19 | 1,735 | −10 | 23 | 5.55 | | 0.85 |
| T13 | (Republic of Ireland) | Lowry | T20 | T42 | CUT | CUT | T40 | • | 2 | T39 | 7 | T18 | T2 | T23 | T45 | T8 | | | | | 1,438 | T59 | T23 | 1,607 | −10 | 20 | 7.08 | | 0.80 |
| T17 | (England) | Hall | CUT | • | T19 | • | T28 | T8 | T58 | • | • | • | • | • | T9 | T10 | T6 | | | | 929 | T22 | 6 | 1,475 | −9 | 25 | 4.31 | | 0.70 |
| T17 | (Scotland) | MacIntyre | 9 | CUT | T47 | 2 | T7 | T15 | T40 | CUT | T11 | T66 | T34 | T20 | T17 | T6 | T6 | | | | 1,488 | T28 | 2 | 2,750 | −9 | 23 | 8.47 | | 1.03 |
| T19 | (United States) | Morikawa | T10 | T14 | T50 | T23 | CUT | 2 | T17 | T17 | 2 | T54 | T17 | T20 | T42 | T8 | | | | | 1,427 | T22 | T33 | 1,655 | −8 | 19 | 7.92 | | 0.69 |
| T19 | (Canada) | Taylor | CUT | T40 | CUT | T23 | CUT | T48 | T33 | T9 | T31 | T49 | T17 | 4 | T17 | 1 | | | | | 1,438 | T44 | T33 | 1,564 | −8 | 23 | 5.43 | | 0.67 |
| T21 | (Sweden) | Åberg | CUT | 7 | CUT | CUT | T23 | T5 | WD | 1 | T22 | T54 | T60 | T16 | T36 | T8 | | | | | 1,559 | T9 | T7 | 2,179 | −7 | 20 | 8.28 | | 0.76 |
| T21 | (England) | Rose | CUT | 2 | CUT | CUT | T16 | • | T3 | CUT | T8 | T42 | WD | T44 | • | 6 | | | | | 1,220 | 1 | T30 | 3,326 | −7 | 18 | 8.86 | | 2.22 |
| T23 | (Northern Ireland) | McIlroy | 1 | 1 | T47 | T19 | T7 | • | 1 | T17 | T15 | • | T7 | • | T6 | T5 | T2 | | | | 3,444 | • | T12 | 3,687 | −6 | 16 | 16.99 | 10.00 | 7.90 |
| T23 | (United States) | McNealy | CUT | T32 | T33 | 37 | T23 | T8 | T40 | 2 | CUT | T3 | T60 | T5 | T17 | T9 | T3 | | | | 1,672 | T28 | 3 | 2,547 | −6 | 24 | 8.32 | | 0.91 |
| T25 | (United States) | Novak | CUT | • | CUT | T42 | T63 | • | T13 | T13 | T34 | 2 | T17 | T51 | T30 | 3 | T3 | 1 | | | 1,625 | T6 | 48 | 2,029 | −4 | 26 | 7.79 | | 0.70 |
| T25 | (United States) | Spaun | 2 | 50 | T37 | 1 | T23 | • | T33 | T34 | T31 | T42 | T17 | CUT | T14 | T3 | T2 | T6 | | | 2,144 | 2 | T23 | 3,493 | −4 | 23 | 13.28 | 3.00 | 3.57 |
| T27 | (United States) | Bridgeman | T50 | • | CUT | CUT | • | • | • | • | T15 | T61 | T4 | T31 | T52 | T2 | 3 | T5 | | | 1,111 | T17 | T19 | 1,475 | E | 27 | 4.44 | | 0.58 |
| T27 | (South Korea) | Im | T61 | T5 | CUT | T57 | T52 | 3 | T33 | CUT | T19 | T11 | T23 | T16 | T61 | T4 | | | | | 1,172 | 2 | T23 | 1,422 | E | 27 | 5.08 | | 0.57 |
| 29 | (Japan) | Matsuyama | CUT | T21 | CUT | T42 | T16 | 1 | T48 | T13 | T22 | • | T17 | 38 | T30 | | | | | | 1,309 | T17 | T26 | 1,630 | +3 | 22 | 6.65 | | 0,59 |
| 30 | (Austria) | Straka | T14 | CUT | CUT | CUT | T52 | T15 | T7 | CUT | T5 | T13 | 1 | 3 | T45 | 1 | 7 | | | | 2,595 | T17 | • | 2,783 | +7 | 22 | 10.65 | 6.00 | 2.14 |

Win
Top 10
Made cut
Missed cut
Withdrew
• Did not play

== Money list ==
The money list was based on prize money won during the season, calculated in U.S. dollars.

| Position | Player | Prize money ($) |
|---|---|---|
| 1 | (United States) Scottie Scheffler | 27,659,550 |
| 2 | (England) Tommy Fleetwood | 18,496,238 |
| 3 | (Northern Ireland) Rory McIlroy | 16,992,418 |
| 4 | (United States) Russell Henley | 14,707,570 |
| 5 | (United States) J. J. Spaun | 13,278,222 |
| 6 | (United States) Ben Griffin | 11,724,352 |
| 7 | (United States) Justin Thomas | 10,896,155 |
| 8 | (Austria) Sepp Straka | 10,650,894 |
| 9 | (United States) Patrick Cantlay | 9,441,931 |
| 10 | (England) Justin Rose | 8,857,976 |

== Awards ==
| Award | Winner | Ref. |
|---|---|---|
| Player of the Year (Jack Nicklaus Trophy) | (United States) Scottie Scheffler | |
| Rookie of the Year (Arnold Palmer Award) | (South Africa) Aldrich Potgieter | |
| Scoring leader (Byron Nelson Award) | (United States) Scottie Scheffler | |

== See also ==
- 2025 Korn Ferry Tour
- 2025 PGA Tour Champions season
