= 2023 Korn Ferry Tour Finals =

Tournament information
- Dates: August 24 – October 8, 2023
- Tour: Korn Ferry Tour

Statistics
- Field: 156 for Albertsons Boise Open; 144 for Simmons Bank Open; 120 for Nationwide Children's Hospital Championship; 75 for Korn Ferry Tour Championship

The 2023 Korn Ferry Tour Finals, the series of four golf tournaments that determined the 30 golfers that earned PGA Tour cards for the 2024 season, was played from August 12 to October 8. It included the following four events:

Date	Tournament	Location	Purse (US$)	Field Size
Aug 24–27	Albertsons Boise Open	Boise, Idaho	1,500,000	156
Sep 14–17	Simmons Bank Open	College Grove, Tennessee	1,500,000	144
Sep 21–24	Nationwide Children's Hospital Championship	Columbus, Ohio	1,500,000	120
Oct 5–8	Korn Ferry Tour Championship	Newburgh, Indiana	1,500,000	75 (no cut)

== Changes for 2023 ==
Unlike in previous seasons, the Finals will not have a separate points list; the top 30 point earners through the entire season, including the Finals, will earn PGA Tour cards. The FedEx Cup standings are no longer criteria for Korn Ferry Tour Finals eligibility. Also, the finals will feature elimination after each event. For the first three events, if a players opts out, their spot will go to the next highest ranked golfer. For the Korn Ferry Tour Championship, only the top 75 ranked golfers will be eligible. All players who qualify for the Korn Ferry Tour Championship are fully exempt for the 2024 Korn Ferry Tour. Players who finish 76 to 100 are conditionally exempt.

== Albertsons Boise Open ==
The Albertsons Boise Open was played August 24–27. Chan Kim won his second straight Korn Ferry Tour event, securing himself a PGA Tour card for 2024.

					Korn Ferry Tour rank	
Place	Player	Score	To par	Winnings ($)	After	Before
1	(United States) Chan Kim	66-62-64-64=256	−28	270,000	2	12
2	(United States) David Kocher	63-69-67-59=258	−26	135,000	43	82
3	(Germany) Thomas Rosenmüller	67-68-64-63=262	−22	90,000	61	104
T4	(United States) Jacob Bridgeman	66-65-65-67=263	−21	62,250	14	21
T4	(United States) Ben Kohles	66-62-66-69=263	−21	62,250	1	1
T6	(United States) Wilson Furr	64-68-67-65=264	−20	49,875	28	40
T6	(United States) Vince Whaley	64-68-65-67=264	−20	49,875	119	166
T8	(United States) Davis Chatfield	67-63-68-67=265	−19	38,445	64	70
T8	(Chile) Cristóbal del Solar	62-67-69-67=265	−19	38,445	44	49
T8	(United States) Chase Seiffert	66-66-68-65=265	−19	38,445	24	32
T8	(United States) Daniel Summerhays	65-68-64-68=265	−19	38,445	73	89
T8	(United States) Tom Whitney	68-65-64-68=265	−19	38,445	16	19

== Simmons Bank Open ==
The Simmons Bank Open was played September 14–17. Grayson Murray won his second Korn Ferry Tour event of the season, and third overall. The win guaranteed Murray a PGA Tour card for 2024.

					Korn Ferry Tour rank	
Place	Player	Score	To par	Winnings ($)	After	Before
1	(United States) Grayson Murray	68-67-70-66=271	−17	270,000	6	26
T2	(United States) Mason Anderson	71-65-72-66=274	−14	97,500	41	57
T2	(United States) Carter Jenkins	73-66-65-70=274	−14	97,500	25	46
T2	(United States) Jamie Lovemark	68-69-67-70=274	−14	97,500	70	130
T5	(United States) Trace Crowe	70-69-68-68=275	−13	46,750	39	42
T5	(United States) Chris Gotterup	69-69-69-68=275	−13	46,750	24	33
T5	(United States) Ben Kohles	72-69-66-68=275	−13	46,750	1	1
T5	(United States) Jack Maguire	70-70-67-68=275	−13	46,750	76	93
T5	(United States) Chris Naegel	70-69-66-70=275	−13	46,750	91	121
T5	(Sweden) Pontus Nyholm	69-65-70-71=275	−13	46,750	66	79

== Nationwide Children's Hospital Championship ==
The Nationwide Children's Hospital Championship was played September 21–24. Norman Xiong won his second Korn Ferry Tour event which guaranteed him a PGA Tour card for 2024.

					Korn Ferry Tour rank	
Place	Player	Score	To par	Winnings ($)	After	Before
1	(United States) Norman Xiong	69-67-71-67=274	−10	270,000	12	59
T2	(United States) Joe Highsmith	72-67-70-69=278	−6	97,500	27	48
T2	(Australia) Curtis Luck	72-70-70-66=278	−6	97,500	47	61
T2	(United States) Chris Petefish	67-70-71-70=278	−6	97,500	45	55
5	(United States) Jake Knapp	67-73-71-68=279	−5	57,000	11	15
6	(United States) Max Greyserman	68-69-75-68=280	−4	51,750	8	11
T7	(United States) Trace Crowe	71-68-74-68=281	−3	42,938	33	39
T7	(United States) Joey Garber	68-75-70-68=281	−3	42,938	68	83
T7	(United States) Chandler Phillips	66-72-69-74=281	−3	42,938	13	14
T7	(United States) Josh Teater	69-71-71-70=281	−3	42,938	34	43

== Table of qualifying players ==
Table key:

	Earned PGA Tour card for 2024
	Win
	Top-10 finish
	Did not advance to next tournament
	Played way into next tournament
*	Player already had amassed enough points to guarantee promotion before event
‡	Eligible due to higher ranked player not playing

	Player	Pre-Finals		Albertsons		Simmons Bank		Nationwide Champ.		Tour Champ.	
	Player	Points	Rank	Finish	Rank after	Finish	Rank after	Finish	Rank after	Finish	Final rank
(United States)	Ben Kohles	1,548	1	T4*	1	T5*	1	T42*	1	T6*	1
(United States)	Rico Hoey	1,497	2	CUT*	3	T26*	3	T66*	3	T30*	4
(Canada)	Ben Silverman	1,477	3	T35*	4	T48*	4	T42*	4	T65*	5
(Argentina)	Alejandro Tosti	1,462	4	WD*	5	DNP*	5	CUT*	5	T6*	3
(United States)	Pierceson Coody	1,330	5	T51*	6	T60*	7	T37*	6	T70*	6
(Belgium)	Adrien Dumont de Chassart	1,133	6	DNP*	7	CUT*	8	CUT*	10	T41*	11
(England)	David Skinns	1,122	7	DNP	8	CUT*	9	T42*	9	55*	12
(United States)	Jimmy Stanger	1,041	8	T54	9	CUT	10	CUT*	14	T30*	15
(United States)	Max Greyserman	982	9	T26	10	T44	11	6*	8	T28*	9
(United States)	Nicholas Lindheim	979	10	DNP	11	DNP	13	T37	16	DNP*	17
(United States)	Chandler Phillips	967	11	CUT	12	CUT	14	T7	13	T6*	10
(United States)	Chan Kim	937	12	1	2	T44*	2	CUT*	2	T20*	2
(United States)	Jake Knapp	882	13	T13	13	CUT	15	5	11	T10*	13
(United States)	Kevin Dougherty	853	14	T21	15	CUT	17	CUT	18	T65	22
(Argentina)	Jorge Fernández-Valdés	852	15	CUT	20	CUT	21	CUT	24	T61	31
(United States)	Parker Coody	840	16	T26	17	CUT	18	T66	20	T46	25
(United States)	Scott Gutschewski	834	17	T26	18	CUT	19	70	21	T58	28
(United States)	Patrick Fishburn	816	18	T26	21	CUT	22	T21	19	T20	19
(United States)	Tom Whitney	805	19	T8	16	T26	16	CUT	17	T61	21
(United States)	Ryan McCormick	800	20	T13	19	CUT	20	CUT	22	T41	27
(United States)	Jacob Bridgeman	796	21	T4	14	T16	12	T18	15	T20*	14
(United States)	Shad Tuten	795	22	T54	23	T48	26	CUT	29	T28	32
(Puerto Rico)	Rafael Campos	784	23	T26	22	T37	23	T37	23	T52	30
(United States)	Jackson Suber	765	24	CUT	25	CUT	28	T24	30	T46	37
(Australia)	Rhein Gibson	755	25	CUT	27	CUT	29	CUT	36	T36	40
(United States)	Cody Blick	747	26	T54	29	CUT	31	CUT	38	T41	41
(Australia)	Brett Drewitt	742	27	CUT	30	T63	32	CUT	39	60	43
(United States)	Logan McAllister	739	28	CUT	31	CUT	34	T61	40	63	44
(United States)	John VanDerLaan	737	29	CUT	32	CUT	35	T54	41	T41	42
(United States)	Grayson Murray	724	30	T26	26	1	6	WD*	7	DNP*	7
(United States)	Taylor Dickson	701	31	CUT	34	T26	36	T61	43	T17	39
(United States)	Chase Seiffert	694	32	T8	24	CUT	27	T24	28	T39	33
(Canada)	Roger Sloan	693	33	T70	35	T22	33	T18	31	T10	29
(United States)	Matt McCarty	690	34	CUT	37	T26	38	T24	37	T14	35
(United States)	Chris Gotterup	686	35	T21	33	T5	24	T37	25	T20	23
(United States)	Mac Meissner	677	36	CUT	38	T22	37	T24	35	T3	20
(France)	Paul Barjon	672	37	T35	36	68	40	CUT	45	1	8
(United States)	Josh Teater	662	38	T70	39	CUT	43	T7	34	5	26
(Sweden)	Tim Widing	651	39	CUT	40	CUT	44	CUT	49	19	46
(United States)	Wilson Furr	649	40	T6	28	CUT	30	T24	32	T6	24
(United States)	Spencer Levin	639	41	CUT	41	T26	42	CUT	46	T67	50
(United States)	Trace Crowe	598	42	CUT	42	T5	39	T7	33	T36	38
(United States)	Frankie Capan III	581	43	CUT	47	CUT	49	T11	50	T41	51
(United States)	Ricky Castillo	579	44	T62	45	T37	46	71	52	64	53
(United States)	Carter Jenkins	570	45	T43	46	T2	25	T61	26	T46	34
(United States)	Joe Highsmith	523	46	T21	48	T42	48	T2	27	T3	18
(United States)	Thomas Walsh	522	47	CUT	50	T65	51	CUT	54	T10	54
(Mexico)	Roberto Díaz	515	48	T26	49	CUT	50	CUT	53	T67	55
(Chile)	Cristóbal del Solar	507	49	T8	44	CUT	47	T11	48	T70	52
(United States)	Trent Phillips	493	50	T54	51	CUT	52	T42	55	T67	58
(United States)	Sam Saunders	484	51	T65	52	CUT	54	CUT	58	T46	60
(Germany)	Jeremy Paul	481	52	CUT	54	T44	53	CUT	57	T30	56
(United States)	Chris Petefish	475	53	T43	53	CUT	55	T2	44	T46	45
(United States)	Patrick Cover	472	54	DNP	55	CUT	57	T61	60	T20	57
(United States)	Brad Hopfinger	458	55	T54	56	CUT	58	WD	61	T56	63
(United States)	Mason Andersen	441	56	T43	57	T2	41	T18	42	T10	36
(United States)	Paul Peterson	431	57	CUT	58	T16	56	CUT	59	WD	61
(Canada)	Wil Bateman	413	58	CUT	60	T63	62	CUT	64	T58	68
(Australia)	Curtis Luck	398	59	DNP	62	T26	61	T2	47	T26	47
(United States)	Norman Xiong	383	60	CUT	65	11	59	1	12	T52*	16
(Australia)	Dimitrios Papadatos	378	61	T43	63	CUT	64	CUT	67	T14	65
(United States)	Jacob Solomon	371	62	CUT	66	CUT	68	T33	66	T20	66
(United States)	Quade Cummins	368	63	T18	59	T48	60	T11	56	T52	59
(Argentina)	Fabián Gómez	360	64	CUT	67	CUT	69	CUT	71	2	48
(United States)	Brian Campbell	348	65	CUT	69	CUT	71	CUT	75	WD	75
(United States)	Brandon Harkins	343	66	CUT	70	CUT	73	T42	72	T17	70
(United States)	Steven Fisk	334	67	T35	68	T37	67	T11	63	T30	64
(United States)	John Augenstein	326	68	CUT	72	T37	72	T49	73	T56	74
(United States)	Michael Johnson	306	69	CUT	74	T26	74	CUT	77	–	77
(United States)	Davis Chatfield	305	70	T8	64	CUT	65	T11	62	T36	62
(United States)	Patrick Welch	301	71	CUT	75	T44	79	T24	74	T30	73
(United States)	Brandon Crick	299	72	CUT	77	T53	81	T24	76	–	76
(United States)	Kyle Jones	280	73	T35	76	CUT	82	CUT	84	–	84
(United States)	Peter Knade	278	74	CUT	78	CUT	86	CUT	90	–	90
(Sweden)	Pontus Nyholm	277	75	CUT	79	T5	66	T49	69	T30	69
(Argentina)	Nelson Ledesma	273	76	T13	71	CUT	75	CUT	78	–	78
(United States)	Isaiah Salinda	272	77	CUT	80	T16	77	CUT	80	–	80
(United States)	Daniel Miernicki	272	78	CUT	82	T37	84	T61	85	–	85
(United States)	Colin Featherstone	268	79	CUT	83	CUT	87	T54	91	–	91
(United States)	Brandon Hagy	268	80	CUT	84	CUT	88	CUT	93	–	93
(United States)	Alistair Docherty	263	81	T65	85	CUT	89	T33	86	–	86
(United States)	David Kocher	262	82	2	43	T42	45	T54	51	T14	49
(United States)	Patrick Newcomb	260	83	T43	81	T53	85	CUT	89	–	89
(United States)	Brandon McIver	254	84	CUT	89	CUT	93	T54	97	–	97
(United States)	Jared Wolfe	254	85	CUT	90	CUT	95	T66	99	–	99
(United States)	Zach Bauchou	254	86	T43	86	T22	80	T49	82	–	82
(United States)	Dan McCarthy	242	87	T35	87	CUT	90	T33	88	–	88
(United States)	Andrew Kozan	235	88	CUT	94	DNP	100	DNP	105	–	105
(United States)	Daniel Summerhays	234	89	T8	73	CUT	78	T54	81	–	81
(United States)	Jack Maguire	233	90	73	93	T5	76	CUT	79	–	79
(United States)	Joey Garber	232	91	CUT	95	T12	83	T7	68	T46	72
(United States)	Patrick Flavin	231	92	CUT	96	69	101	CUT	106	–	106
(United States)	William Mouw	223	93	CUT	97	CUT	105	T24	98	–	98
(Norway)	Kristoffer Ventura	220	94	CUT	99	T65	104	T11	87	–	87
(Argentina)	Martin Contini	219	95	T68	98	T26	96	CUT	101	–	101
(United States)	Joe Weiler	215	96	T26	91	T53	94	T21	83	–	83
(Japan)	Kaito Onishi	215	97	T70	100	DNP	107	T24	100	–	100
(United States)	Matt Atkins	215	98	CUT	101	T48	103	CUT	108	–	108
(United States)	Zack Fischer	205	99	CUT	104	CUT	110	CUT	111	–	111
(United States)	Wade Binfield	201	100	CUT	105	CUT	111	CUT	113	–	113
(United States)	Jay Card III	201	101	CUT	106	CUT	112	72	112	–	112
(United States)	Brendon Jelley	201	102	CUT	107	T26	102	CUT	107	–	107
(United States)	Martin Flores	199	103	T13	88	CUT	92	T49	92	–	92
(Germany)	Thomas Rosenmüller	189	104	3	61	CUT	63	T42	65	T39	67
(United States)	Akshay Bhatia	189	105	DNP	110	DNP	115	DNP	117	–	117 (Note: Player earned a 2024 PGA Tour card by winning a tournament on the PGA Tour (Bhatia, 2023 Barracuda Championship and Villegas, 2023 Butterfield Bermuda Championship).)
(United States)	Kevin Velo	184	106	T62	108	CUT	113	CUT	116	–	116
(Argentina)	Alan Wagner	184	107	CUT	112	T16	98	CUT	104	–	104
(United States)	Evan Harmeling	182	108	T13	92	T53	97	CUT	103	–	103
(United States)	Michael Feagles	181	109	T68	111	CUT	117	CUT	118	–	118
(United States)	Alex Chiarella	178	110	T43	109	CUT	114	T54	114	–	114
(United States)	Danny Walker	174	111	CUT	113	T53	119	CUT	121	–	121
(United States)	T. J. Vogel	172	112	CUT	115	T12	99	T33	96	–	96
(United States)	Chase Parker	169	113	CUT	117	CUT	123	–	–	–	123
(United States)	Mark Anderson	168	114	T21	102	CUT	109	T49	109	–	109
(United States)	Noah Goodwin	167	115	CUT	118	T16	106	CUT	110	–	110
(United States)	Ryan Burnett	167	116	T54	114	CUT	120	T66	122	–	122
(United States)	Mitchell Meissner	163	117	T21	103	T48	108	T21	95	–	95
(United States)	Bo Hoag	160	118	T60	120	CUT	125	–	–	–	125
(Colombia)	Camilo Villegas	159	119	T43	116	CUT	121	T37‡	115	–	115
(United States)	Joshua Creel	158	120	CUT	122	CUT	126	–	–	–	126
(United States)	Ryan Gerard	152	121	DNP	124	DNP	128	–	–	–	128
(United States)	Ryan Blaum	147	122	T51	123	CUT	127	–	–	–	127
(Argentina)	Abel Gallegos	143	123	CUT	127	CUT	131	–	–	–	131
(Japan)	Yuto Katsuragawa	143	124	CUT	128	T53	130	–	–	–	130
(United States)	Blayne Barber	141	125	CUT	129	CUT	133	–	–	–	133
(United States)	Vince India	140	126	T62	125	T53	129	–	–	–	129
(United States)	Dalton Ward	124	127	CUT	132	CUT	135	–	–	–	135
(United States)	Ollie Schniederjans	123	128	CUT	133	DNP	136	–	–	–	136
(United States)	Spencer Ralston	116	129	CUT	135	T12	118	CUT	120	–	120
(United States)	Cooper Musselman	115	130	CUT	137	T16	122	T42‡	119	–	119
(United States)	Bryson Nimmer	114	131	CUT	138	CUT	141	–	–	–	141
(France)	Jérémy Gandon	114	132	T51	134	CUT	137	–	–	–	137
(United States)	A. J. Crouch	111	133	T26	126	T22	116	T11	102	–	102
(United States)	Grant Hirschman	111	134	CUT	139	CUT	143	–	–	–	143
(United States)	Ashton Van Horne	110	135	T60	136	T60	139	–	–	–	139
(United States)	Kyle Westmoreland	110	136	CUT	140	DNP	144	–	–	–	144
(United States)	Jamie Lovemark	110	137	T35	130	T2	70	T54	70	T20	71
(United States)	Chris Naegel	109	138	T18	121	T5	91	73	94	–	94
(United States)	Rob Oppenheim	108	139	CUT	141	T65	142	–	–	–	142
(United States)	Dawson Armstrong	105	140	CUT	142	CUT	145	–	–	–	145
(United States)	Andrew Yun	104	141	CUT	143	CUT	146	–	–	–	146
(United States)	Tommy Gainey	101	142	CUT	144	DNP	147	–	–	–	147
(Guatemala)	José Toledo	100	143	WD	145	CUT‡	148	–	–	–	148
(China)	Zhang Xinjun	99	144	CUT	146	CUT‡	149	–	–	–	149
(United States)	Ian Holt	99	145	CUT	147	CUT‡	150	–	–	–	150
(United States)	Willie Mack III	92	146	T65	148	CUT‡	151	–	–	–	151
(United States)	Spencer Cross	92	147	CUT	149	T26‡	138	–	–	–	138
(United States)	Lanto Griffin	88	148	DNP	150	DNP‡	153	–	–	–	153
(United States)	Curtis Thompson	86	149	CUT	152	CUT‡	155	–	–	–	155
(China)	Lin Yuxin	85	150	CUT	154	T26‡	140	–	–	–	140
(United States)	Scott Brown	84	151	CUT	155	DNP‡	156	–	–	–	156
(United States)	Tain Lee	83	152	DNP	156	DNP‡	157	–	–	–	157
(United States)	Sean O'Hair	82	153	CUT	157	DNP‡	158	–	–	–	158
(United States)	Alex Weiss	82	154	74	153	T60‡	152	–	–	–	152
(Sweden)	Jonas Blixt	78	155	DNP	158	DNP‡	159	–	–	–	159
(United States)	Scott Stevens	75	156	CUT	159	T12‡	132	–	–	–	132
(United States)	Austin Eckroat	75	157	DNP‡	160	–	–	–	–	–	160
(United States)	Cole Hammer	75	158	CUT‡	161	–	–	–	–	–	161
(United States)	Ross Steelman	73	159	CUT‡	162	–	–	–	–	–	162
(South Africa)	Dawie van der Walt	73	160	DNP‡	163	–	–	–	–	–	163
(United States)	RJ Manke	73	161	T18‡	131	CUT	134	–	–	–	134
(United States)	Joel Thelen	68	162	T35‡	151	CUT‡	154	–	–	–	154
(United States)	Billy Tom Sargent	64	163	CUT‡	165	–	–	–	–	–	165
(United States)	Michael Gellerman	63	164	DNP‡	166	–	–	–	–	–	166
(South Korea)	Kang Sung-hoon	63	165	CUT‡	167	–	–	–	–	–	167
(United States)	Vince Whaley	62	166	T6‡	119	DNP	124	–	–	–	124
(Mexico)	José de Jesús Rodríguez	61	167	DNP‡	168	–	–	–	–	–	168
(United States)	Jake Staiano	60	168	CUT‡	169	–	–	–	–	–	169
(United States)	Chris Baker	60	169	DNP‡	170	–	–	–	–	–	170
(United States)	Bronson Burgoon	60	170	DNP‡	171	–	–	–	–	–	171
(Mexico)	Emilio Gonzalez	53	171	DNP‡	172	–	–	–	–	–	172
(United States)	Joseph Winslow	51	172	CUT‡	173	–	–	–	–	–	173
(United States)	James Nicholas	50	173	T35‡	164	–	–	–	–	–	164
