= Korn Ferry Tour Finals =

Golf tournament series

Official logo.

The Korn Ferry Tour Finals is a series of four golf tournaments that conclude the season on the Korn Ferry Tour. The finals are contested in a playoff format, similar to the FedEx Cup playoffs on the PGA Tour, with players eliminated after each of the first three tournaments. At the end of the Finals, the top 20 players on the season-long points list earn PGA Tour membership for the following season ("Tour cards").

From 2013 to 2022, the Finals were conducted in a very different format, as a separate entity from the tour's regular season. The top 75 players from the Korn Ferry Tour, along with players who failed to make the top 125 on the PGA Tour that same season, competed in a series of three or four tournaments. The top 25 players based on points earned in the Finals alone earned PGA Tour cards for the following season. The series was established as a replacement for the PGA Tour Qualifying Tournament in 2013.

== Tournaments ==
Beginning in 2025, the Finals have consisted of the following four tournaments:

Korn Ferry Tour Finals tournaments
Tournament	Location	Competitors
Simmons Bank Open	Franklin, Tennessee	156
Nationwide Children's Hospital Championship	Columbus, Ohio	132
Compliance Solutions Championship	Owasso, Oklahoma	100
Korn Ferry Tour Championship	Glen Allen, Virginia	60

Each event has an enhanced purse of US$1,500,000 and awards more points than the standard Korn Ferry Tour event. The first three events feature a standard tour cut rules, while the Tour Championship does not have a cut.

In 2023 and 2024, the first two years under the revised format, the Albertsons Boise Open was a Finals event, but was replaced by the Compliance Solutions Championship in 2025. In 2026, the Korn Ferry Tour Championship is moving from French Lick, Indiana to Glen Allen, Virginia and will be reduced from 75 players to 60.

In 2019, 2021 and 2022, under the original format, the Finals consisted of only three tournaments, as the Simmons Bank Open was not part of the series. In 2020, the Tour Finals series was not held as the Korn Ferry Tour revised its schedule into a combined 2020-21 season due to the COVID-19 pandemic. The three tournaments that would have been part of the Finals were contested as regular-season events.

Prior to 2019, the Finals had been a series of four tournaments from its inception in 2013. Three other tournaments were part of the Tour Finals for part of that period:

- DAP Championship in Beachwood, Ohio from 2016-2018
- Hotel Fitness Championship in Fort Wayne, Indiana from 2013-2015
- Small Business Connection Championship in Davidson, North Carolina from 2013-2015

== Qualification ==
The top 156 players in the Korn Ferry Tour points system through the end of the regular season qualify for the first Finals event. The number of participants is reduced each week of the Finals based on the season-long points ranking. In 2023, however, in the first three Finals events, players ranked below the cutoff were able to play if eligible players did not take part. This provision was dropped in 2024 and no alternate lists were used.

Under the format in place from 2013 to 2022, there were four ways to qualify for the Finals:

- Finish in the top-75 on the Korn Ferry Tour's regular season standings (money list from 2013 to 2018, points from 2019).
- Finish the PGA Tour's regular season ranked 126–200 on the FedEx Cup points list. Not all players with this criterion competed, as some were already exempt for the PGA Tour the next year through other means.
- As a non-member of the PGA Tour, earn enough FedEx Cup points to place 126–200 on the points list.
- Special medical exemptions.

== Tour cards ==
Under the system introduced in 2023, the top 30 players on the Tour at the conclusion of the Finals earn a PGA Tour card. The points for the regular season and Finals are combined, with the Finals events worth more points than regular-season tournaments. The change in the qualifying rules for the Korn Ferry Tour were made in conjunction with new rules for the PGA Tour Qualifying Tournament, which awarded PGA Tour cards in 2023 for the first time in a decade. In 2025, the number of those earning Tour cards through the finals was reduced to twenty.

Under the previous format, the top 25 players in the Finals (originally based on earnings, later on points) earned PGA Tour cards. This was in addition to the cards earned by the top 25 players on the Korn Ferry Tour during the regular season.

Players who win their third event of the season during the finals are also fully exempt on the PGA Tour. The top 60 players, those who qualify for the Korn Ferry Tour Championship, are guaranteed no worse than full Korn Ferry Tour status for the next season. Those who finish 61st to 100th are conditionally exempt. Players ranked 21st to 50th are admitted entry into the Final Stage of Q School, those 51st-75th start at Second Stage, and those 76th to 100th begin at the First Stage.

== Criticism ==
One unintended consequence of the elimination of direct access to the PGA Tour through "Q school" was that more amateurs turned professional earlier in the year (June instead of August) in order to have a better chance at earning a PGA Tour card through high finishes via sponsors' exemptions.

== Winners ==
=== Tournament winners ===
Year	Albertsons Boise Open	Simmons Bank Open	Nationwide Children's Hospital Championship	Korn Ferry Tour Championship
2024	(United States) Matt McCarty	(United States) Paul Peterson	(United States) Frankie Capan III	(United States) Braden Thornberry
2023	(United States) Chan Kim	(United States) Grayson Murray	(United States) Norman Xiong	(France) Paul Barjon
Year	Albertsons Boise Open	Nationwide Children's Hospital Championship	Korn Ferry Tour Championship	
2022	(United States) Will Gordon	(Sweden) David Lingmerth	(United States) Justin Suh	
2021	(United States) Greyson Sigg	(Canada) Adam Svensson	(United States) Joseph Bramlett	
Year	Nationwide Children's Hospital Championship	Albertsons Boise Open	Korn Ferry Tour Championship	
2019	(United States) Scottie Scheffler	(United States) Matthew NeSmith	(England) Tom Lewis	
Year	Nationwide Children's Hospital Championship	DAP Championship	Albertsons Boise Open	Web.com Tour Championship
2018	(United States) Robert Streb	(United States) Kramer Hickok	(South Korea) Bae Sang-moon	(United States) Denny McCarthy
Year	Nationwide Children's Hospital Championship	Albertsons Boise Open	DAP Championship	Web.com Tour Championship
2017	(United States) Peter Uihlein	(United States) Chesson Hadley (2/2)	(United States) Nicholas Lindheim	(United States) Jonathan Byrd
Year	DAP Championship	Albertsons Boise Open	Nationwide Children's Hospital Championship	Web.com Tour Championship
2016	(United States) Bryson DeChambeau	(United States) Michael Thompson	(United States) Grayson Murray	Canceled*
Year	Hotel Fitness Championship	Small Business Connection Championship/Chiquita Classic	Nationwide Children's Hospital Championship	Web.com Tour Championship
2015	(Sweden) Henrik Norlander	(United States) Chez Reavie	(United States) Andrew Loupe	(Argentina) Emiliano Grillo
2014	(United States) Bud Cauley	(Canada) Adam Hadwin	(United States) Justin Thomas	(United States) Derek Fathauer
2013	(South Africa) Trevor Immelman	(United States) Andrew Svoboda	(South Korea) Noh Seung-yul	(United States) Chesson Hadley (1/2)

*Tournament canceled due to Hurricane Matthew

=== Money/points leaders ===
Year	Regular season points leader	Finals points leader	
2024	(United States) Matt McCarty	**(United States) Matt McCarty**	
2023	(United States) Ben Kohles	(United States) **Ben Kohles**	
Year	Regular season winner	Finals winner	Overall winner
2022	(China) Yuan Yechun	(United States) **Justin Suh**	(United States) **Justin Suh**
2021	(Germany) Stephan Jäger	(United States) **Joseph Bramlett**	(Germany) **Stephan Jäger**
2019	(China) Zhang Xinjun	(United States) **Scottie Scheffler**	(United States) **Scottie Scheffler**
2018	(South Korea) Im Sung-jae	(United States) **Denny McCarthy**	**(South Korea) Im Sung-jae**
2017	(United States) Brice Garnett	(United States) **Chesson Hadley**	(United States) **Chesson Hadley**
2016	(United States) Wesley Bryan	(United States) **Grayson Murray**	(United States) **Wesley Bryan**
2015	(United States) Patton Kizzire	(United States) **Chez Reavie**	(United States) **Patton Kizzire**
2014	(Mexico) Carlos Ortiz	(United States) **Derek Fathauer**	(Canada) **Adam Hadwin**
2013	(United States) **Michael Putnam**	(United States) **John Peterson**	(United States) Chesson Hadley

Bolded golfers received full exemptions for the PGA Tour not subject to re-order. In 2013, golfers who led the regular season money list and the Finals money list received full exemptions. Since 2014, golfers who led the overall money list and the Finals money list received full exemptions. Points replaced money beginning in 2019.
