= 2023 Korn Ferry Tour graduates =

Top 30 players on the 2023 Korn Ferry Tour

This is a list of golfers who graduated from the Korn Ferry Tour in 2023. The top 30 players on the 2023 Korn Ferry Tour points list earned PGA Tour cards for 2024.

The structure of the Korn Ferry Tour season and qualification for the PGA Tour was changed from what had been in place from 2013 to 2022, in which 25 cards had been awarded via the Korn Ferry Tour's regular-season points list and 25 more through the Korn Ferry Tour Finals points list. Under the new format, a single points list covered the entire Korn Ferry Tour season, including the Finals, and 30 cards were awarded; ten additional cards will be awarded via the European Tour and at least five through the revived PGA Tour Qualifying Tournament.

Ben Kohles is fully exempt for the 2024 PGA Tour season after leading the points list.

	Player	Points rank	Points
(United States)	Ben Kohles	1	1,893
(United States)	Chan Kim^{†}	2	1,592
(Argentina)	Alejandro Tosti*	3	1,560
(United States)	Rico Hoey*	4	1,559
(Canada)	Ben Silverman	5	1,524
(United States)	Pierceson Coody*	6	1,366
(United States)	Grayson Murray	7	1,356
(France)	Paul Barjon	8	1,296
(United States)	Max Greyserman*	9	1,170
(United States)	Chandler Phillips*	10	1,156
(Belgium)	Adrien Dumont de Chassart*	11	1,147
(England)	David Skinns	12	1,142
(United States)	Jake Knapp*	13	1,138
(United States)	Jacob Bridgeman*	14	1,081
(United States)	Jimmy Stanger*	15	1,075
(United States)	Norman Xiong*	16	1,068
(United States)	Nicholas Lindheim	17	998
(United States)	Joe Highsmith*	18	993
(United States)	Patrick Fishburn*	19	937
(United States)	Mac Meissner*	20	935
(United States)	Tom Whitney*	21	924
(United States)	Kevin Dougherty*	22	901
(United States)	Chris Gotterup^{†}	23	892
(United States)	Wilson Furr*	24	887
(United States)	Parker Coody*	25	886
(United States)	Josh Teater	26	876
(United States)	Ryan McCormick*	27	876
(United States)	Scott Gutschewski	28	875
(Canada)	Roger Sloan	29	868
(Puerto Rico)	Rafael Campos	30	862

*PGA Tour rookie in 2024
^{†}First-time PGA Tour member in 2024, but ineligible for rookie status due to having played eight or more PGA Tour events as a professional in a previous season

== Wins on the PGA Tour in 2024 ==
No.	Date	Player	Tournament	Winning score	Margin of victory	Runner(s)-up	Payout ($)
1	Jan 14	(United States) Grayson Murray	Sony Open in Hawaii	−17 (69-63-64-67=263)	Playoff	(South Korea) An Byeong-hun (United States) Keegan Bradley	1,494,000
2	Feb 25	(United States) Jake Knapp	Mexico Open	−19 (67-64-63-71=265)	2 strokes	(Finland) Sami Välimäki	1,458,000
3	May 12	(United States) Chris Gotterup	Myrtle Beach Classic	−22 (66-64-65-67=262)	6 strokes	(United States) Alistair Docherty (United States) Davis Thompson	720,000
4	Nov 17	(Puerto Rico) Rafael Campos	Bermuda Championship	−19 (70-65-62-68=265)	3 strokes	(United States) Andrew Novak	1,242,000

== Runner-up finishes on the PGA Tour in 2024 ==
No.	Date	Player	Tournament	Winner	Winning score	Runner-up score	Payout ($)
1	Mar 31	(Argentina) Alejandro Tosti	Texas Children's Houston Open	(Germany) Stephan Jäger	−12 (69-66-66-67=268)	−11 (66-67-68-68=269)	553,735
2	May 5	(United States) Ben Kohles	CJ Cup Byron Nelson	(Canada) Taylor Pendrith	−23 (64-67-63-67=261)	−22 (65-66-65-66=262)	1,035,500
3	Jul 14	(United States) Pierceson Coody	ISCO Championship	(England) Harry Hall	−22 (66-67-64-69=266)	−22 (61-67-68-70=266)	268,000
4	Jul 14	(United States) Rico Hoey	ISCO Championship	(England) Harry Hall	−22 (66-67-64-69=266)	−22 (64-68-67-69=266)	268,000
5	Jul 28	(United States) Max Greyserman	3M Open	(Venezuela) Jhonattan Vegas	−17 (68-66-63-70=267)	−16 (70-68-67-63=268)	882,900
6	Aug 11	(United States) Max Greyserman (2)	Wyndham Championship	(England) Aaron Rai	−18 (65-65-68-64=262)	−16 (69-60-66-69=264)	861,100
7	Oct 27	(United States) Max Greyserman (3)	Zozo Championship	(Colombia) Nico Echavarría	−20 (64-64-65-67=260)	−19 (64-68-64-65=261)	748,000

== Results on the PGA Tour in 2024 ==
Player	Starts	Cuts made	Best finish	Earnings ($)	FedEx Cup rank
(United States) Ben Kohles	29	18	2	1,853,159	99
(United States) Chan Kim^{†}	27	19	T6	1,405,653	112
(Argentina) Alejandro Tosti*	28	11	T2	1,086,746	137
(United States) Rico Hoey*	28	18	T2	1,792,875	86
(Canada) Ben Silverman	25	18	T4	1,262,599	115
(United States) Pierceson Coody*	27	15	T2	915,564	131
(United States) Grayson Murray	13	8	Win	2,471,532	^
(France) Paul Barjon	27	5	T4	328,507	181
(United States) Max Greyserman*	26	19	2x2/T2	4,297,356	48
(United States) Chandler Phillips*	27	19	T3	1,714,290	94
(Belgium) Adrien Dumont de Chassart*	27	12	T3	822,655	139
(England) David Skinns	28	16	T4	1,225,402	122
(United States) Jake Knapp*	23	18	Win	3,102,773	64
(United States) Jacob Bridgeman*	27	17	T11	1,250,191	113
(United States) Jimmy Stanger*	16	6	T3	604,066	159
(United States) Norman Xiong*	18	6	9	234,154	187
(United States) Kevin Dougherty*	26	8	T30	219,150	189
(United States) Nicholas Lindheim	15	2	T31	67,855	212
(United States) Joe Highsmith*	26	13	5	1,340,018	110
(United States) Patrick Fishburn*	26	14	3	1,928,584	81
(United States) Mac Meissner*	25	16	4	1,456,769	106
(United States) Tom Whitney*	27	10	T11	493,082	164
(United States) Chris Gotterup^{†}	26	13	Win	1,170,837	119
(United States) Wilson Furr*	25	7	T13	221,091	184
(United States) Parker Coody*	24	9	T6	380,854	174
(United States) Josh Teater	25	4	T45	62,192	214
(United States) Ryan McCormick*	25	9	T4	473,255	161
(United States) Scott Gutschewski	20	4	T62	53,135	223
(Canada) Roger Sloan	24	11	T12	352,344	173
(Puerto Rico) Rafael Campos	24	8	Win	1,857,846	82

- Retained his PGA Tour card for 2025: won or finished in the top 125 of the final FedEx Cup points list through the 2024 Fed Ex Cup Fall Season.
- Retained PGA Tour conditional status for 2025: finished between 126 and 150 on the final FedEx Cup list through the 2024 Fed Ex Cup Fall Season.
- Failed to retain his PGA Tour card for 2025: finished lower than 150 on the final FedEx Cup list through the 2024 Fed Ex Cup Fall Season.
- ^ Grayson Murray died on May 25, 2024.

== See also ==
- 2023 PGA Tour Qualifying School graduates
- List of golfers who earned PGA Tour cards from the 2023 Race to Dubai rankings
