= 2025 U.S. Open (golf) =

Golf tournament

Tournament information
- Dates: June 12–15, 2025
- Location: Oakmont, Pennsylvania and Plum, Pennsylvania; 40.526°N 79.827°W
- Course: Oakmont Country Club
- Organized by: USGA
- Tours: PGA Tour; European Tour; Japan Golf Tour

Statistics
- Par: 70
- Length: 7,372 yards (6,741 m)
- Field: 156 players, 67 after cut
- Cut: 147 (+7)
- Prize fund: $21,500,000
- Winner's share: $4,300,000

Champion
- (United States) J. J. Spaun
- 279 (−1)
- Location in the United States Location in Pennsylvania

The 2025 United States Open Championship was the 125th edition of the U.S. Open, the national open golf championship of the United States. It was a 72-hole stroke play tournament played from June 12–15 at Oakmont Country Club in Oakmont and Plum, Pennsylvania, suburbs northeast of Pittsburgh in Allegheny County.

With birdies at the final two holes, J. J. Spaun won his first major title with a one-under-par total of 279, two strokes ahead of runner-up Robert MacIntyre.

== Course layout ==
| Hole | Yards | Par | Hole | Yards | Par |
|---|---|---|---|---|---|
| 1 | 488 | 4 | 10 | 461 | 4 |
| 2 | 346 | 4 | 11 | 400 | 4 |
| 3 | 462 | 4 | 12 | 632 | 5 |
| 4 | 611 | 5 | 13 | 182 | 3 |
| 5 | 408 | 4 | 14 | 379 | 4 |
| 6 | 200 | 3 | 15 | 507 | 4 |
| 7 | 485 | 4 | 16 | 236 | 3 |
| 8 | 289 | 3 | 17 | 312 | 4 |
| 9 | 472 | 4 | 18 | 502 | 4 |
| Out | 3,761 | 35 | In | 3,611 | 35 |
| Source: | | Total | | 7,372 | 70 |

Yardage by round

| Round | Hole | 1 | 2 | 3 | 4 | 5 | 6 | 7 | 8 | 9 | Out | 10 | 11 | 12 | 13 | 14 | 15 | 16 | 17 | 18 | In | Total |
|---|---|---|---|---|---|---|---|---|---|---|---|---|---|---|---|---|---|---|---|---|---|---|
| 1st | Yards | 484 | 356 | 470 | 621 | 405 | 204 | 487 | 276 | 463 | 3,766 | 454 | 403 | 618 | 184 | 398 | 523 | 222 | 327 | 512 | 3,641 | 7,407 |
| 2nd | Yards | 492 | 359 | 454 | 626 | 420 | 192 | 491 | 299 | 465 | 3,798 | 472 | 406 | 647 | 161 | 368 | 489 | 238 | 305 | 498 | 3,584 | 7,382 |
| 3rd | Yards | 487 | 348 | 467 | 600 | 419 | 210 | 475 | 253 | 478 | 3,737 | 452 | 392 | 617 | 177 | 396 | 523 | 224 | 320 | 492 | 3,593 | 7,330 |
| Final | Yards | 493 | 352 | 459 | 614 | 422 | 196 | 496 | 301 | 467 | 3,800 | 464 | 399 | 640 | 187 | 389 | 503 | 244 | 314 | 509 | 3.649 | 7,449 |

== Field ==
The field for the U.S. Open is made up of players who gain entry through qualifying events and those who are exempt from qualifying. The exemption criteria include provisions for recent major champions, winners of major amateur events, and leading players in the world rankings. Qualifying is in two stages, local and final, with some players being exempted through to final qualifying. A record 10,202 entries were received.

=== Exemptions ===
This list details the exemption criteria for the 2025 U.S. Open and the players who qualified under them; any additional criteria under which players were exempt is indicated in parentheses. (Note: (a) – denotes amateur.)

1. Recent winners of the U.S. Open (2015–2024)

- Wyndham Clark (11,21)
- Bryson DeChambeau (2,21)
- Matt Fitzpatrick
- Dustin Johnson (6)
- Brooks Koepka (7)
- Jon Rahm (6)
- Jordan Spieth (21)
- Gary Woodland

2. The leading ten players, and those tying for tenth place, in the 2024 U.S. Open

- Sam Burns (11,21)
- Patrick Cantlay (11,21)
- Corey Conners (21)
- Tony Finau (11,21)
- Russell Henley (11,21)
- Hideki Matsuyama (6,11,12,21)
- Rory McIlroy (6,9,11,12,21)
- Matthieu Pavon (11)
- Xander Schauffele (7,8,11,21)
- Davis Thompson (21)

3. The winner of the 2024 U.S. Senior Open

- Richard Bland

4. The winner of the 2024 U.S. Amateur

- José Luis Ballester

5. Winners of the 2024 U.S. Junior Amateur and U.S. Mid-Amateur, and the runner-up in the 2024 U.S. Amateur (Note: Players qualifying in this category must remain an amateur through the conclusion of the U.S. Open.)

- Evan Beck (a)
- Trevor Gutschewski (a)
- Noah Kent (a)

6. Recent winners of the Masters Tournament (2020–2025)

- Scottie Scheffler (7,9,11,12,21,23)

7. Recent winners of the PGA Championship (2021–2025)

- Phil Mickelson
- Justin Thomas (11,21)

8. Recent winners of The Open Championship (2021–2024)

- Brian Harman (21)
- Collin Morikawa (11,21)
- Cameron Smith

9. Recent winners of The Players Championship (2023–2025)

10. The winner of the 2024 BMW PGA Championship

- Billy Horschel (11,21) did not play.

11. All players who qualified and were eligible for the 2024 Tour Championship

- Ludvig Åberg (21)
- An Byeong-hun (21)
- Christiaan Bezuidenhout
- Akshay Bhatia (21)
- Keegan Bradley (21)
- Tommy Fleetwood (21)
- Tom Hoge (21)
- Viktor Hovland (21)
- Im Sung-jae (21)
- Chris Kirk
- Shane Lowry (21)
- Robert MacIntyre (21)
- Taylor Pendrith (21)
- Aaron Rai (21)
- Adam Scott (21)
- Sepp Straka (12,21)
- Sahith Theegala (21) did not play.

12. Winners of multiple PGA Tour events (Note: Events must carry full-point allocation towards the FedEx Cup.) from the 2024 U.S. Open to the start of the 2025 tournament

13. The top 5 players in the FedEx Cup standings as of May 19 who are not yet exempt

- Jacob Bridgeman
- Brian Campbell
- Cameron Davis
- Ryan Gerard
- Sam Stevens

14. The top player on the 2024 Korn Ferry Tour points list

- Matt McCarty (21)

15. The top 2 players on the 2024 Race to Dubai who are not yet exempt as of May 19

- Rasmus Højgaard
- Thriston Lawrence

16. The top player on the 2025 Race to Dubai as of May 19 who is not yet exempt

- Laurie Canter

17. The winner of the 2024 Amateur Championship

- Jacob Skov Olesen forfeited his exemption by turning professional.

18. The winner of the Mark H. McCormack Medal in 2024

- Luke Clanton forfeited his exemption by turning professional.

19. The individual winner of the 2025 NCAA Division I Men's Golf Championship

- Michael La Sasso (a)

20. The winner of the 2025 Latin America Amateur Championship

- Justin Hastings (a)

21. The leading 60 players on the Official World Golf Ranking as of May 19

- Daniel Berger
- Jason Day
- Thomas Detry
- Nick Dunlap
- Nico Echavarría
- Harris English
- Lucas Glover
- Max Greyserman
- Ben Griffin
- Tyrrell Hatton
- Joe Highsmith
- Mackenzie Hughes
- Stephan Jäger
- Michael Kim
- Kim Si-woo
- Tom Kim
- Min Woo Lee
- Denny McCarthy
- Maverick McNealy
- Andrew Novak
- J. T. Poston
- Patrick Reed
- Davis Riley
- Justin Rose
- J. J. Spaun
- Nick Taylor
- Jhonattan Vegas

22. The leading 60 players on the Official World Golf Ranking if not otherwise exempt as of June 9

- Bud Cauley (Note: Bud Cauley and Cameron Young both qualified in Powell, Ohio, and subsequently became exempt in category 22. As a result, the first and second alternates from Powell were added to the field.)
- Ryan Fox
- Cameron Young

23. Winner of the 2024 Olympic gold medal

24. The top player from within the top 3 of the 2025 LIV Golf League individual standings as of May 19 who is not yet exempt

- Joaquín Niemann

25. Special exemptions

None

=== Qualifiers ===
| Date | Location | Venue | Field | Spots | Qualifiers (Note: (L) – denotes a player who progressed through local qualifying.) |
|---|---|---|---|---|---|
| May 19 | Surrey, England | Walton Heath Golf Club | 100 | 8 | Sam Bairstow, Jacques Kruyswijk, Frédéric Lacroix, Joakim Lagergren, Guido Migliozzi, Edoardo Molinari, Andrea Pavan, Jordan Smith |
| May 19 | Kōka, Japan | Tarao Country Club | 43 | 3 | Jinichiro Kozuma, Yuta Sugiura, Scott Vincent |
| May 19 | Dallas, Texas | Bent Tree Country Club | 86 | 7 | James Hahn, Johnny Keefer, Rasmus Neergaard-Petersen, Carlos Ortiz, Adam Schenk, Lance Simpson (a), Cameron Tankersley (a) |
| Jun 2 | Toronto, Ontario, Canada | Lambton Golf and Country Club | 66 | 7 | Emiliano Grillo, Mark Hubbard, Niklas Nørgaard, Thorbjørn Olesen, Victor Perez, Kevin Velo, Matt Wallace |
| Jun 2 | Santa Clarita, California | Valencia Country Club | 84 | 4 | Joey Herrera (L), Riley Lewis (L), Zach Pollo (a,L), Preston Summerhays |
| Jun 2 | West Palm Beach, Florida | Emerald Dunes Club | 81 | 4 | Philip Barbaree (L), Frankie Harris (a,L), Justin Hicks, Austen Truslow (L) |
| Jun 2 | Atlanta, Georgia | Piedmont Driving Club | 84 | 5 | Jackson Buchanan (L), Will Chandler, Mason Howell (a,L), Jackson Koivun (a), Tyler Weaver (a) |
| Jun 2 | Rockville, Maryland | Woodmont Country Club | 84 | 4 | Trevor Cone, Bryan Lee (a), Marc Leishman, Ryan McCormick |
| Jun 2 | Summit, New Jersey | Canoe Brook Country Club (North and South courses) | 78 | 4 | Roberto Díaz, Chris Gotterup, Ben James (a), James Nicholas (L) |
| Jun 2 | Durham, North Carolina | Duke University Golf Club | 79 | 7 | Zach Bauchou, Chandler Blanchet, Alistair Docherty, Emilio González, George Kneiser (L), Álvaro Ortiz, Trent Phillips |
| Jun 2 | Powell, Ohio | Kinsale Golf and Fitness Club | 66 | 6 | ~~Bud Cauley~~, Lanto Griffin, Justin Lower, Harrison Ott (L), Erik van Rooyen, ~~Cameron Young~~ |
| Jun 2 | Springfield, Ohio | Springfield Country Club | 83 | 4 | Zac Blair, George Duangmanee (L), Grant Haefner (L), Maxwell Moldovan (L) |
| Jun 2 | Walla Walla, Washington | Wine Valley Golf Club | 41 | 2 | Brady Calkins (L), Matt Vogt (a,L) |

==== Alternates who gained entry ====
The following players gained a place in the field having finished as the leading alternates in the specified final qualifying events:

- Matthew Jordan (England) (Note: Jordan replaced Sahith Theegala.)
- Chase Johnson (L) (Powell, Ohio)
- Eric Cole (Powell, Ohio)
- Doug Ghim (Texas) (Note: Claimed spot held for category 22.)
- Takumi Kanaya (Canada) (Note: Claimed spot held for category 22.)
- Riki Kawamoto (Japan) (Note: Claimed spot held for category 22.)

== Round summaries ==
=== First round ===
Thursday, June 12, 2025

J. J. Spaun shot a 66 to lead by one over Thriston Lawrence. Spaun made four birdies in his opening eight holes and recorded the only bogey-free round of the day.

World number one and pre-tournament favorite Scottie Scheffler shot a three-over-par 73. Defending champion Bryson DeChambeau also shot 73, while 2023 and 2024 U.S. Open runner-up Rory McIlroy made four bogeys and a double bogey in his final nine holes to shoot 74.

Patrick Reed holed his second shot from 286 yards (262 m) on the par-5 fourth hole, giving him the first albatross at the U.S. Open since Nick Watney in 2012.

The scoring average was 74.63, the highest first-round scoring average at the tournament since the 2018 U.S. Open at Shinnecock Hills Golf Club (76.47).

| Place | Player | Score | To par |
|---|---|---|---|
| 1 | (United States) J. J. Spaun | 66 | −4 |
| 2 | (South Africa) Thriston Lawrence | 67 | −3 |
| T3 | (South Korea) Im Sung-jae | 68 | −2 |
| T3 | (South Korea) Kim Si-woo | 68 | −2 |
| T3 | (United States) Brooks Koepka | 68 | −2 |
| T6 | (Belgium) Thomas Detry | 69 | −1 |
| T6 | (United States) Ben Griffin | 69 | −1 |
| T6 | (Denmark) Rasmus Neergaard-Petersen | 69 | −1 |
| T6 | (United States) James Nicholas | 69 | −1 |
| T6 | (Spain) Jon Rahm | 69 | −1 |

=== Second round ===
Friday, June 13, 2025
Saturday, June 14, 2025

Sam Burns shot a five-under 65, the lowest round of the day, to lead by one over first-round leader J. J. Spaun, who shot 72. With his 65, Burns beat the field scoring average by 9.78 shots, the most strokes gained in a major championship round since Brooks Koepka's 63 (+10.06) in the opening round of the 2019 PGA Championship.

44-year-old former world number one Adam Scott, making his 96th consecutive start in a major championship, replicated his first-round score of 70 to position himself in tied-4th place, alongside U.S. Open debutant Ben Griffin.

Victor Perez recorded an ace on the par-3 6th hole.

The second round was suspended at 8:15 p.m. local time due to lightning in the area, leaving 13 players to finish their rounds the following morning.

The cut came at 147 (7-over-par). Notables to miss the cut included defending champion Bryson Dechambeau, 2023 champion Wyndham Clark, and Phil Mickelson, six-time major champion reportedly playing in his last U.S. Open. Three of the top eight players in the Official World Golf Ranking also failed to make the cut: Justin Thomas (No. 5), Ludvig Åberg (No. 6), and Sepp Straka (No. 8).

| Place | Player | Score | To par |
|---|---|---|---|
| 1 | (United States) Sam Burns | 72-65=137 | −3 |
| 2 | (United States) J. J. Spaun | 66-72=138 | −2 |
| 3 | (Norway) Viktor Hovland | 71-68=139 | −1 |
| T4 | (United States) Ben Griffin | 69-71=140 | E |
| T4 | (Australia) Adam Scott | 70-70=140 | E |
| T6 | (South Africa) Thriston Lawrence | 67-74=141 | +1 |
| T6 | (France) Victor Perez | 71-70=141 | +1 |
| T8 | (Belgium) Thomas Detry | 69-73=142 | +2 |
| T8 | (United States) Russell Henley | 70-72=142 | +2 |
| T8 | (South Korea) Kim Si-woo | 68-74=142 | +2 |
| T8 | (United States) Brooks Koepka | 68-74=142 | +2 |

=== Third round ===
Saturday, June 14, 2025

Sam Burns shot 69 to retain his outright lead. He led by one stroke over first-round leader J. J. Spaun, who also shot 69. Spaun was joined in second place by Adam Scott, whose 67 was the joint-lowest round of the day.

| Place | Player | Score | To par |
|---|---|---|---|
| 1 | (United States) Sam Burns | 72-65-69=206 | −4 |
| T2 | (Australia) Adam Scott | 70-70-67=207 | −3 |
| T2 | (United States) J. J. Spaun | 66-72-69=207 | −3 |
| 4 | (Norway) Viktor Hovland | 71-68-70=209 | −1 |
| 5 | (Mexico) Carlos Ortiz | 71-72-67=210 | E |
| T6 | (England) Tyrrell Hatton | 73-70-68=211 | +1 |
| T6 | (South Africa) Thriston Lawrence | 67-74-70=211 | +1 |
| 8 | (Denmark) Rasmus Neergaard-Petersen | 69-74-69=212 | +2 |
| T9 | (Scotland) Robert MacIntyre | 70-74-69=213 | +3 |
| T9 | (United States) Cameron Young | 70-74-69=213 | +3 |

=== Final round ===
Sunday, June 15, 2025

==== Summary ====
J. J. Spaun shot a final-round 72 to win his first major championship by two strokes over Robert MacIntyre who posted a 68. After a front-nine 40 that included five bogeys in the first six holes, he played his back nine in three under par including a birdie-birdie finish. Spaun holed a combined 137 feet of putts on holes 12-18, including a 64-foot birdie putt on the 18th to seal the win. The overnight leader Sam Burns was leading until a double bogey on the short 11th, a bogey on the par-5 12th, and another double bogey on the 15th after his ball found a wet spot on the fairway and he was controversially not granted relief. He ultimately shot 78 to finish tied for seventh place. Jon Rahm and Rory McIlroy both shot 67 to tie for the low round of the day.

Play was suspended at 4:01 EDT due to lightning and heavy showers in the area. Play resumed at 5:38 EDT.

Justin Hastings was the only amateur to make the cut and thus was the low amateur. Hastings finished at 295, 15 over par, and finished in a tie for 55th place.

The USGA used traditional final round hole locations on the greens.

==== Final leaderboard ====
Champion
Silver Cup winner (leading amateur)
(a) = amateur
(c) = past champion

Top 10
| Place | Player | Score | To par | Money (US$) |
|---|---|---|---|---|
| 1 | (United States) J. J. Spaun | 66-72-69-72=279 | −1 | 4,300,000 |
| 2 | (Scotland) Robert MacIntyre | 70-74-69-68=281 | +1 | 2,322,000 |
| 3 | (Norway) Viktor Hovland | 71-68-70-73=282 | +2 | 1,462,525 |
| T4 | (England) Tyrrell Hatton | 73-70-68-72=283 | +3 | 878,815 |
| T4 | (Mexico) Carlos Ortiz | 71-72-67-73=283 | +3 | 878,815 |
| T4 | (United States) Cameron Young | 70-74-69-70=283 | +3 | 878,815 |
| T7 | (United States) Sam Burns | 72-65-69-78=284 | +4 | 615,786 |
| T7 | (Spain) Jon Rahm (c) | 69-75-73-67=284 | +4 | 615,786 |
| T7 | (United States) Scottie Scheffler | 73-71-70-70=284 | +4 | 615,786 |
| T10 | (United States) Ben Griffin | 69-71-74-71=285 | +5 | 486,031 |
| T10 | (United States) Russell Henley | 70-72-72-71=285 | +5 | 486,031 |

Leaderboard below the top 10
| Place | Player | Score | To par | Money ($) |
|---|---|---|---|---|
| T12 | (South Africa) Christiaan Bezuidenhout | 72-71-71-72=286 | +6 | 349,741 |
| T12 | (United States) Chris Kirk | 73-70-72-71=286 | +6 | 349,741 |
| T12 | (United States) Brooks Koepka (c) | 68-74-73-71=286 | +6 | 349,741 |
| T12 | (South Africa) Thriston Lawrence | 67-74-70-75=286 | +6 | 349,741 |
| T12 | (Denmark) Rasmus Neergaard-Petersen | 69-74-69-74=286 | +6 | 349,741 |
| T12 | (United States) Xander Schauffele | 72-74-71-69=286 | +6 | 349,741 |
| T12 | (Australia) Adam Scott | 70-70-67-79=286 | +6 | 349,741 |
| T19 | (New Zealand) Ryan Fox | 72-73-73-69=287 | +7 | 243,070 |
| T19 | (Argentina) Emiliano Grillo | 71-72-71-73=287 | +7 | 243,070 |
| T19 | (Northern Ireland) Rory McIlroy (c) | 74-72-74-67=287 | +7 | 243,070 |
| T19 | (France) Victor Perez | 71-70-73-73=287 | +7 | 243,070 |
| T23 | (Australia) Jason Day | 76-67-72-73=288 | +8 | 161,489 |
| T23 | (Belgium) Thomas Detry | 69-73-73-73=288 | +8 | 161,489 |
| T23 | (United States) Chris Gotterup | 76-69-69-74=288 | +8 | 161,489 |
| T23 | (United States) Max Greyserman | 76-67-71-74=288 | +8 | 161,489 |
| T23 | (United States) Collin Morikawa | 70-74-74-70=288 | +8 | 161,489 |
| T23 | (United States) Patrick Reed | 73-74-71-70=288 | +8 | 161,489 |
| T23 | (United States) Jordan Spieth (c) | 70-75-71-72=288 | +8 | 161,489 |
| T23 | (United States) Sam Stevens | 71-72-72-73=288 | +8 | 161,489 |
| T23 | (Canada) Nick Taylor | 73-71-70-74=288 | +8 | 161,489 |
| T23 | (England) Matt Wallace | 72-74-69-73=288 | +8 | 161,489 |
| T33 | (United States) Keegan Bradley | 73-70-72-74=289 | +9 | 113,755 |
| T33 | (South Korea) Tom Kim | 72-73-72-72=289 | +9 | 113,755 |
| T33 | (United States) J. T. Poston | 74-72-70-73=289 | +9 | 113,755 |
| T33 | (England) Aaron Rai | 72-72-72-73=289 | +9 | 113,755 |
| 37 | (United States) Maverick McNealy | 76-69-72-73=290 | +10 | 101,604 |
| T38 | (United States) Tony Finau | 76-70-74-71=291 | +11 | 90,608 |
| T38 | (England) Matt Fitzpatrick (c) | 74-73-72-72=291 | +11 | 90,608 |
| T38 | (Australia) Marc Leishman | 71-75-68-77=291 | +11 | 90,608 |
| T38 | (Canada) Taylor Pendrith | 72-72-78-69=291 | +11 | 90,608 |
| T42 | (United States) Trevor Cone | 71-73-72-76=292 | +12 | 73,014 |
| T42 | (South Korea) Kim Si-woo | 68-74-74-76=292 | +12 | 73,014 |
| T42 | (Japan) Hideki Matsuyama | 74-73-77-68=292 | +12 | 73,014 |
| T42 | (United States) Andrew Novak | 76-71-73-72=292 | +12 | 73,014 |
| T46 | (United States) Daniel Berger | 72-72-76-73=293 | +13 | 57,070 |
| T46 | (Denmark) Rasmus Højgaard | 71-73-74-75=293 | +13 | 57,070 |
| T46 | (Denmark) Niklas Nørgaard | 76-70-75-72=293 | +13 | 57,070 |
| T46 | (Venezuela) Jhonattan Vegas | 74-70-72-77=293 | +13 | 57,070 |
| T50 | (United States) Ryan Gerard | 72-74-69-79=294 | +14 | 48,207 |
| T50 | (Canada) Mackenzie Hughes | 73-72-74-75=294 | +14 | 48,207 |
| T50 | (United States) Michael Kim | 75-71-76-72=294 | +14 | 48,207 |
| T50 | (United States) Ryan McCormick | 70-77-76-71=294 | +14 | 48,207 |
| T50 | (United States) Adam Schenk | 71-72-76-75=294 | +14 | 48,207 |
| T55 | (England) Laurie Canter | 72-75-71-77=295 | +15 | 46,183 |
| T55 | (Cayman Islands) Justin Hastings (a) | 73-73-73-76=295 | +15 | 0 |
| T57 | (South Korea) Im Sung-jae | 68-77-76-75=296 | +16 | 45,524 |
| T57 | (United States) Denny McCarthy | 70-74-76-76=296 | +16 | 45,524 |
| T59 | (United States) Harris English | 73-74-77-74=298 | +18 | 44,644 |
| T59 | (United States) Brian Harman | 71-76-75-76=298 | +18 | 44,644 |
| T61 | (United States) Johnny Keefer | 76-69-77-77=299 | +19 | 43,544 |
| T61 | (United States) James Nicholas | 69-78-75-77=299 | +19 | 43,544 |
| T61 | (England) Jordan Smith | 72-74-79-74=299 | +19 | 43,544 |
| T64 | (Australia) Cameron Davis | 74-73-82-73=302 | +22 | 42,445 |
| T64 | (France) Matthieu Pavon | 71-74-81-76=302 | +22 | 42,445 |
| 66 | (United States) Philip Barbaree | 76-71-75-82=304 | +24 | 41,785 |
| WD | (Canada) Corey Conners | 72-74-72=218 | +8 | |
| CUT | (Sweden) Ludvig Åberg | 72-76=148 | +8 | |
| CUT | (United States) Patrick Cantlay | 76-72=148 | +8 | |
| CUT | (United States) Wyndham Clark (c) | 74-74=148 | +8 | |
| CUT | (United States) Lucas Glover (c) | 74-74=148 | +8 | |
| CUT | (United States) Tom Hoge | 75-73=148 | +8 | |
| CUT | (United States) Ben James (a) | 75-73=148 | +8 | |
| CUT | (United States) Jackson Koivun (a) | 72-76=148 | +8 | |
| CUT | (United States) Phil Mickelson | 74-74=148 | +8 | |
| CUT | (Italy) Edoardo Molinari | 74-74=148 | +8 | |
| CUT | (Denmark) Thorbjørn Olesen | 76-72=148 | +8 | |
| CUT | (Australia) Cameron Smith | 75-73=148 | +8 | |
| CUT | (United States) Davis Thompson | 75-73=148 | +8 | |
| CUT | (South Korea) An Byeong-hun | 74-75=149 | +9 | |
| CUT | (United States) Bud Cauley | 70-79=149 | +9 | |
| CUT | (England) Tommy Fleetwood | 74-75=149 | +9 | |
| CUT | (United States) Lanto Griffin | 71-78=149 | +9 | |
| CUT | (United States) Mark Hubbard | 76-73=149 | +9 | |
| CUT | (Germany) Stephan Jäger | 73-76=149 | +9 | |
| CUT | (Japan) Jinichiro Kozuma | 75-74=149 | +9 | |
| CUT | (Australia) Min Woo Lee | 77-72=149 | +9 | |
| CUT | (South Africa) Erik van Rooyen | 75-74=149 | +9 | |
| CUT | (Zimbabwe) Scott Vincent | 75-74=149 | +9 | |
| CUT | (England) Tyler Weaver (a) | 75-74=149 | +9 | |
| CUT | (United States) Akshay Bhatia | 76-74=150 | +10 | |
| CUT | (United States) Jacob Bridgeman | 72-78=150 | +10 | |
| CUT | (United States) Jackson Buchanan | 74-76=150 | +10 | |
| CUT | (United States) Bryson DeChambeau (c) | 73-77=150 | +10 | |
| CUT | (United States) Frankie Harris (a) | 79-71=150 | +10 | |
| CUT | (United States) Dustin Johnson (c) | 75-75=150 | +10 | |
| CUT | (Japan) Takumi Kanaya | 75-75=150 | +10 | |
| CUT | (South Africa) Jacques Kruyswijk | 73-77=150 | +10 | |
| CUT | (United States) Michael La Sasso (a) | 75-75=150 | +10 | |
| CUT | (Chile) Joaquín Niemann | 75-75=150 | +10 | |
| CUT | (United States) Trent Phillips | 75-75=150 | +10 | |
| CUT | (United States) Kevin Velo | 71-79=150 | +10 | |
| CUT | (United States) Gary Woodland (c) | 73-77=150 | +10 | |
| CUT | (United States) Evan Beck (a) | 79-72=151 | +11 | |
| CUT | (United States) Zac Blair | 74-77=151 | +11 | |
| CUT | (United States) Nick Dunlap | 77-74=151 | +11 | |
| CUT | (United States) Riley Lewis | 76-75=151 | +11 | |
| CUT | (Austria) Sepp Straka | 78-73=151 | +11 | |
| CUT | (Spain) José Luis Ballester | 76-76=152 | +12 | |
| CUT | (United States) Chandler Blanchet | 75-77=152 | +12 | |
| CUT | (United States) Eric Cole | 76-76=152 | +12 | |
| CUT | (Mexico) Emilio González | 75-77=152 | +12 | |
| CUT | (Japan) Riki Kawamoto | 78-74=152 | +12 | |
| CUT | (United States) Maxwell Moldovan | 76-76=152 | +12 | |
| CUT | (United States) Lance Simpson (a) | 74-78=152 | +12 | |
| CUT | (United States) Justin Thomas | 76-76=152 | +12 | |
| CUT | (England) Sam Bairstow | 81-72=153 | +13 | |
| CUT | (Colombia) Nico Echavarría | 78-75=153 | +13 | |
| CUT | (United States) James Hahn | 78-75=153 | +13 | |
| CUT | (United States) Joey Herrera | 77-76=153 | +13 | |
| CUT | (United States) Mason Howell (a) | 77-76=153 | +13 | |
| CUT | (France) Frédéric Lacroix | 76-77=153 | +13 | |
| CUT | (United States) Austen Truslow | 76-77=153 | +13 | |
| CUT | (United States) Joe Highsmith | 79-75=154 | +14 | |
| CUT | (England) Matthew Jordan | 74-80=154 | +14 | |
| CUT | (United States) Harrison Ott | 75-79=154 | +14 | |
| CUT | (England) Justin Rose (c) | 77-77=154 | +14 | |
| CUT | (United States) Cameron Tankersley (a) | 80-74=154 | +14 | |
| CUT | (United States) Noah Kent (a) | 80-75=155 | +15 | |
| CUT | (United States) Davis Riley | 78-77=155 | +15 | |
| CUT | (United States) Bryan Lee (a) | 78-78=156 | +16 | |
| CUT | (United States) Zach Pollo (a) | 74-82=156 | +16 | |
| CUT | (United States) Brian Campbell | 79-78=157 | +17 | |
| CUT | (United States) Doug Ghim | 79-78=157 | +17 | |
| CUT | (Republic of Ireland) Shane Lowry | 79-78=157 | +17 | |
| CUT | (Mexico) Álvaro Ortiz | 75-82=157 | +17 | |
| CUT | (England) Richard Bland | 76-82=158 | +18 | |
| CUT | (Mexico) Roberto Díaz | 85-73=158 | +18 | |
| CUT | (United States) Alistair Docherty | 80-78=158 | +18 | |
| CUT | (United States) Grant Haefner | 81-77=158 | +18 | |
| CUT | (United States) Chase Johnson | 79-79=158 | +18 | |
| CUT | (Italy) Guido Migliozzi | 75-83=158 | +18 | |
| CUT | (United States) Preston Summerhays | 78-80=158 | +18 | |
| CUT | (Italy) Andrea Pavan | 82-77=159 | +19 | |
| CUT | (United States) Trevor Gutschewski (a) | 80-80=160 | +20 | |
| CUT | (United States) George Kneiser | 81-79=160 | +20 | |
| CUT | (Sweden) Joakim Lagergren | 80-80=160 | +20 | |
| CUT | (United States) Matt McCarty | 82-78=160 | +20 | |
| CUT | (Japan) Yuta Sugiura | 79-81=160 | +20 | |
| CUT | (United States) Will Chandler | 78-84=162 | +22 | |
| CUT | (United States) Matt Vogt (a) | 82-81=163 | +23 | |
| CUT | (United States) Brady Calkins | 82-85=167 | +27 | |
| CUT | (United States) Justin Hicks | 84-83=167 | +27 | |
| CUT | (United States) Justin Lower | 83-84=167 | +27 | |
| CUT | (United States) George Duangmanee | 86-89=175 | +35 | |
| WD | (United States) Zach Bauchou | 78 | +8 | |

==== Scorecard ====
| Hole | 1 | 2 | 3 | 4 | 5 | 6 | 7 | 8 | 9 | 10 | 11 | 12 | 13 | 14 | 15 | 16 | 17 | 18 |
|---|---|---|---|---|---|---|---|---|---|---|---|---|---|---|---|---|---|---|
| Par | 4 | 4 | 4 | 5 | 4 | 3 | 4 | 3 | 4 | 4 | 4 | 5 | 3 | 4 | 4 | 3 | 4 | 4 |
| (United States) Spaun | −2 | −1 | E | E | +1 | +2 | +2 | +2 | +2 | +2 | +2 | +1 | +1 | E | +1 | +1 | E | −1 |
| (Scotland) MacIntyre | +4 | +4 | +5 | +3 | +3 | +4 | +4 | +4 | +3 | +3 | +3 | +3 | +3 | +2 | +2 | +2 | +1 | +1 |
| (Norway) Hovland | −1 | E | +1 | +1 | E | E | E | +1 | +2 | +2 | +2 | +2 | +2 | +2 | +3 | +3 | +2 | +2 |
| (England) Hatton | +2 | +2 | +2 | +1 | +1 | +1 | +1 | +1 | +1 | +2 | +2 | +2 | +1 | +1 | +1 | +1 | +2 | +3 |
| (Mexico) Ortiz | +1 | +1 | +1 | +1 | +1 | +2 | +2 | +2 | +2 | +2 | +1 | +1 | +1 | +1 | +3 | +3 | +3 | +3 |
| (United States) Burns | −4 | −3 | −3 | −3 | −2 | −2 | −2 | −2 | −1 | −2 | E | +1 | +1 | +1 | +3 | +4 | +3 | +4 |
| (Australia) Scott | −2 | −2 | −1 | −2 | −2 | −1 | −1 | E | E | E | +1 | +1 | +1 | +2 | +3 | +5 | +5 | +6 |

Cumulative tournament scores, relative to par

| Eagle | Birdie | Bogey | Double bogey |
