= The Bahamas Great Abaco Classic =

Golf tournament in the Bahamas

Tournament information
- Location: Great Abaco, The Bahamas
- Established: 2017
- Course: The Abaco Club
- Par: 72
- Length: 7,153 yards (6,541 m)
- Tour: Korn Ferry Tour
- Format: Stroke play
- Prize fund: US$1,000,000
- Month played: January

Tournament record score
- Aggregate: 263 Sudarshan Yellamaraju (2025)
- To par: −25 as above

Current champion
- (United States) Ian Holt

Final champion
- Location in the Bahamas

The Bahamas Great Abaco Classic is a golf tournament on the Korn Ferry Tour, played at the Abaco Club on Winding Bay in the Bahamas.

== History ==
It is one of two Korn Ferry Tour events in the Bahamas, along with The Bahamas Great Exuma Classic. Both events were first played in January 2017 starting on a Sunday and finishing on a Wednesday, rather than the standard Thursday–Sunday schedule. Due to the ongoing recovery efforts on the island from Hurricane Dorian, the 2020 edition was temporarily moved to Baha Mar in Nassau, and retained the Abaco Classic name in its title.

== Winners ==
| Year | Winner | Score | To par | Margin of victory | Runner(s)-up |
|---|---|---|---|---|---|
| 2026 | (United States) Ian Holt | 276 | −12 | 1 stroke | (United States) Alistair Docherty (Cayman Islands) Justin Hastings |
| 2025 | (Canada) Sudarshan Yellamaraju | 263 | −25 | 5 strokes | (Japan) Kensei Hirata (Scotland) Russell Knox |
| 2024 | (South Africa) Aldrich Potgieter | 278 | −10 | 2 strokes | (United States) Quade Cummins |
| 2023 | (Canada) Ben Silverman | 273 | −15 | Playoff | (United States) Cody Blick |
| 2022 | (United States) Brandon Harkins | 270 | −18 | Playoff | (China) Dou Zecheng |
2021: No tournament
| 2020 | (United States) Jared Wolfe | 270 | −18 | 4 strokes | (United States) Brandon Harkins |
| 2019 | (Puerto Rico) Rafael Campos | 281 | −7 | 1 stroke | (United States) Vince Whaley |
| 2018 | (Canada) Adam Svensson | 271 | −17 | 1 stroke | (South Korea) Im Sung-jae |
| 2017 | (United States) Andrew Landry | 272 | −16 | 3 strokes | (Scotland) Jimmy Gunn |
