= Grayson Murray =

American professional golfer (1993–2024)

Personal information
- Full name: Grayson Colby Murray
- Nationality: United States
- Born: October 1, 1993 Raleigh, North Carolina, U.S.
- Died: May 25, 2024 (aged 30) Palm Beach Gardens, Florida, U.S.
- Height: 6 ft 1 in (1.85 m)
- Weight: 200 lb (91 kg; 14 st)

Career
- Sport: Golf
- College: Wake Forest University; East Carolina University; Arizona State University; University of North Carolina Greensboro
- Turned professional: 2015
- Former tours: PGA Tour; Korn Ferry Tour eGolf Professional Tour
- Professional wins: 7
- Highest ranking: 46 (January 14, 2024) (as of October 25, 2026)

Number of wins by tour
- PGA Tour: 2
- Korn Ferry Tour: 3
- Other: 2

Best results in major championships
- Masters Tournament: 51st: 2024
- PGA Championship: T22: 2017
- U.S. Open: 63rd: 2022
- The Open Championship: DNP

Achievements and awards
- Web.com Tour Finals money list winner: 2016

Grayson Colby Murray (October 1, 1993 – May 25, 2024) was an American professional golfer. He won two PGA Tour events: the 2017 Barbasol Championship and the 2024 Sony Open in Hawaii.

== Early life and career ==
Murray was born on October 1, 1993, in Raleigh, North Carolina. He won three straight Callaway Junior Championships from 2006 to 2008 and was the top-ranked golfer nationally in his age group. Murray attended Leesville Road High School in Raleigh, where he competed in golf and won both a team and individual NCHSAA 4A state championship.

Murray enrolled at Wake Forest University. Uncomfortable there, he transferred to East Carolina University after one semester, but left ECU's golf team after eight weeks due to disagreements with the coach. He committed to transfer to the University of North Carolina at Greensboro, but opted instead to skip a semester. Murray enrolled at Arizona State University in 2014. He played in the 2013 U.S. Open as an amateur.

== Professional career ==
Murray earned conditional status on the 2016 Web.com Tour by tying for 74th at Q School. A tie for tenth at the Rex Hospital Open in his native North Carolina, in which he competed on a sponsor exemption, gave him entry into the following tournament, where he tied for eighth and guaranteed himself full playing time for the rest of the season. He had four further top 10s, including a playoff loss at the Digital Ally Open, and finished 18th on the regular-season money list, earning a PGA Tour card for 2017. On July 23, 2017, he earned his first PGA Tour victory by winning the Barbasol Championship.

Murray won twice on the Korn Ferry Tour during the 2023 season, winning the AdventHealth Championship and the Simmons Bank Open, the latter being a Korn Ferry Finals event. These results earned Murray a tour card for the 2024 PGA Tour season.

On January 14, 2024, Murray earned his second PGA Tour victory by winning the Sony Open in Hawaii in a playoff.

== Personal life and death ==
Murray struggled with alcoholism, anxiety, and depression. Following the 2014 Southern Amateur, which he walked away from while near the lead, Murray was diagnosed with social anxiety.

In October 2022, Murray was severely injured in a scooter crash in Bermuda before the Butterfield Bermuda Championship, leading him to withdraw from the event.

Murray was engaged to Christiana Ritchie as of 2024. He was a Christian.

Murray died on May 25, 2024, at his home in Palm Beach Gardens, Florida, at the age of 30. He withdrew from the Charles Schwab Challenge in Fort Worth, Texas, the day before, citing an illness. The next day, his parents confirmed that he had died by suicide. Players on the tour honored Murray by wearing red-and-black ribbons during the final round of the Charles Schwab Challenge; Murray had previously worn those colors in a tribute to the Carolina Hurricanes, of which he was a fan.

== Amateur wins ==
- 2006 Callaway Junior World Golf Championship (Boys 11–12)
- 2007 Callaway Junior World Golf Championship (Boys 13–14)
- 2008 Callaway Junior World Golf Championship (Boys 13–14)

== Professional wins (6) ==
=== PGA Tour wins (2) ===
No.	Date	Tournament	Winning score	To par	Margin of victory	Runner(s)-up
1	Jul 23, 2017	Barbasol Championship	67-64-64-68=263	−21	1 stroke	(United States) Chad Collins
2	Jan 14, 2024	Sony Open in Hawaii	69-63-64-67=263	−17	Playoff	(South Korea) An Byeong-hun, (United States) Keegan Bradley

PGA Tour playoff record (1–0)

No.	Year	Tournament	Opponents	Result
1	2024	Sony Open in Hawaii	(South Korea) An Byeong-hun, (United States) Keegan Bradley	Won with birdie on first extra hole

=== Korn Ferry Tour wins (3) ===
Legend
Finals events (2)
Other Korn Ferry Tour (1)

No.	Date	Tournament	Winning score	To par	Margin of victory	Runner(s)-up
1	Sep 25, 2016	Nationwide Children's Hospital Championship	69-67-68-68=272	−12	1 stroke	(Australia) Cameron Smith
2	May 21, 2023	AdventHealth Championship	68-69-64-68=269	−19	1 stroke	(United States) Wilson Furr, (United States) Rico Hoey
3	Sep 17, 2023	Simmons Bank Open	68-67-70-66=271	−17	3 strokes	(United States) Mason Andersen, (United States) Carter Jenkins, (United States) Jamie Lovemark

Korn Ferry Tour playoff record (0–1)

No.	Year	Tournament	Opponents	Result
1	2016	Digital Ally Open	(United States) Wesley Bryan, (United States) J. T. Poston	Bryan won with birdie on second extra hole

=== eGolf Professional Tour wins (1) ===
No.	Date	Tournament	Winning score	To par	Margin of victory	Runner-up
1	Jul 11, 2015	Imperial Headwear Southern Open	63-64-64-63=254	−26	7 strokes	(United States) Christian Brand

=== Other wins (1) ===
- 2015 New Hampshire Open

== Results in major championships ==
Tournament	2013	2014	2015	2016	2017	2018
Masters Tournament						
U.S. Open	CUT					
PGA Championship					T22	

Tournament	2019	2020	2021	2022	2023	2024
Masters Tournament						51
PGA Championship						T43
U.S. Open				63		

Did not play

CUT = missed the half-way cut
"T" indicates a tie for a place
Note: Murray never played in The Open Championship.

== Results in The Players Championship ==
Tournament	2017	2018	2019	2020	2021	2022	2023	2024
The Players Championship	T79	T30	CUT	C				T42

CUT = missed the halfway cut
"T" indicates a tie for a place
C = canceled after the first round due to the COVID-19 pandemic

== PGA Tour career summary ==
Grayson Murray career statistics
Season	Starts	Cuts made	Wins	2nd	3rd	Top-10	Top-25	Best finish	Earnings ($)	Money list rank
2012	1	0	0	0	0	0	0	0	0	–
2017	30	18	1	0	0	2	7	1	1,468,728	75
2018	22	15	0	0	0	2	7	8	1,056,628	112
2019	14	5	0	0	0	0	1	T12	125,511	217
2020	14	7	0	0	0	1	1	T10	244,150	179
2021	22	6	0	0	1	1	2	T3	255,130	190
2022	12	4	0	0	0	0	1	T13	218,304	198
2023	13	5	0	0	0	2	3	T6	437,066	182
2024	12	8	1	0	0	2	3	1	2,471,532	37^{1}
Career	140	66	2	0	1	10	25	1	6,277,049	306

^{1} Money list ranking as of May 19, 2024, at the end of his last completed tournament.

== See also ==
- 2016 Web.com Tour Finals graduates
- 2019 Korn Ferry Tour Finals graduates
- 2023 Korn Ferry Tour graduates
