= Sudarshan Yellamaraju =

Canadian professional golfer (born 2001)

Personal information
- Nationality: Canada
- Born: July 9, 2001 (age 25) Visakhapatnam, India
- Height: 6 ft (183 cm)
- Weight: 175 lb (79 kg)

Career
- Sport: Golf
- Turned professional: 2021
- Current tour: PGA Tour
- Former tours: Korn Ferry Tour; PGA Tour Canada
- Professional wins: 1
- Highest ranking: 96 (June 14, 2026) (as of November 15, 2026)

Number of wins by tour
- Korn Ferry Tour: 1

Best results in major championships
- Masters Tournament: DNP
- PGA Championship: CUT: 2026
- U.S. Open: CUT: 2026
- The Open Championship: DNP

Sudarshan Yellamaraju (born July 9, 2001) is a Canadian professional golfer on the PGA Tour. After turning pro out of high school, he spent two years on the PGA Tour Canada and two years on the Korn Ferry Tour, winning his first professional event in 2025 at The Bahamas Great Abaco Classic. He became a PGA Tour member in 2026, and recorded a top-5 finish at The Players Championship in his debut.

== Early life ==
Yellamaraju was born in Visakhapatnam, India, where his father's office overlooked a golf course; the two of them would routinely watch golf on television to learn the game together. When he was four years old, his family moved to Winnipeg in Canada, where Yellamaraju learned golf at an indoor facility while watching YouTube videos to improve his swing. The family moved again to Mississauga when Yellamaraju was 11. He won a number of junior and amateur events as a teenager, highlighted by the 2017 Ontario Men's Amateur, which he won by a single stroke as the youngest player in the field. He considered going to college, but could not afford the expense and did not get good enough scholarship offers, so instead turned professional in 2021. Yellamaraju attended Stephen Lewis Secondary School in Mississauga, Ontario prior to turning professional.

== Professional career ==
Yellamaraju entered his first two PGA Tour Canada events by winning Monday qualifiers before eventually becoming a full status member of the tour in 2022. A strong series of results qualified him for the Korn Ferry Tour for 2024, but he initially struggled, recording just two top-25 finishes and finishing 99th in points in his first season. He won his first professional event in 2025 at The Bahamas Great Abaco Classic, shooting 25-under-par to defeat Russell Knox and Kensei Hirata by five strokes. At the end of 2025, he was 19th on the Korn Ferry Tour points list, enough to qualify him for PGA Tour status for 2026. He made the cut at five of his first six events in 2026 before finishing tied for fifth at The Players Championship, four shots behind winner Cameron Young.

== Amateur wins ==
- 2017 Investor's Group Ontario Men's Amateur

== Professional wins (1) ==
=== Korn Ferry Tour wins (1) ===
No.	Date	Tournament	Winning score	To par	Margin of victory	Runners-up
1	Jan 22, 2025	The Bahamas Great Abaco Classic	70-64-65-64=263	−25	5 strokes	(Japan) Kensei Hirata, (Scotland) Russell Knox

== Results in major championships ==
Tournament	2026
Masters Tournament	
PGA Championship	CUT
U.S. Open	CUT
The Open Championship	

Did not play

CUT = missed the half-way cut
T = tied

== Results in The Players Championship ==
Tournament	2026
The Players Championship	T5

Top 10

"T" indicates a tie for a place

== See also ==
- 2025 Korn Ferry Tour graduates
