= Magnit Championship =

Golf tournament

Tournament information
- Location: Jackson Township, New Jersey
- Established: 2023
- Course: Metedeconk National Golf Club
- Par: 72
- Tour: Korn Ferry Tour
- Format: Stroke play
- Prize fund: $1,000,000
- Month played: August
- Final year: 2024

Tournament record score
- Aggregate: 268 Chan Kim
- To par: −20 as above

Final champion
- (United States) Max McGreevy

Location map
- Location in the United States Location in New Jersey

The Magnit Championship was a golf tournament on the Korn Ferry Tour, held in New Jersey. The tournament was only played in 2023 and 2024, when it served as the regular-season finale.

== Winners ==
Year	Winner	Score	To par	Margin of victory	Runner(s)-up
2024	(United States) Max McGreevy	270	−18	3 strokes	(United States) Frankie Capan III (United States) Ricky Castillo (United States) Will Chandler (Sweden) Tim Widing
2023	(United States) Chan Kim	268	−20	3 strokes	(United States) Taylor Dickson
