= Josh Teater =

American professional golfer (born 1979)

Personal information
- Full name: Joshua Bain Teater
- Nationality: United States
- Born: April 6, 1979 (age 47) Danville, Kentucky, U.S.
- Height: 5 ft 10 in (1.78 m)
- Weight: 180 lb (82 kg; 13 st)
- Spouse: Ashley
- Children: 2

Career
- Sport: Golf
- College: Morehead State University
- Turned professional: 2002
- Current tour: PGA Tour
- Former tour: Korn Ferry Tour
- Professional wins: 2
- Highest ranking: 98 (March 31, 2013)

Number of wins by tour
- Korn Ferry Tour: 2

Best results in major championships
- Masters Tournament: DNP
- PGA Championship: T47: 2013
- U.S. Open: T56: 2013
- The Open Championship: 82nd: 2013

Joshua Bain Teater (born April 6, 1979) is an American professional golfer who has played on the PGA Tour.

== Early life and amateur career ==
Teater was born in Danville, Kentucky but grew up in Lexington. He graduated from Henry Clay High School in 1997. He played baseball and golf for the blue devils before attended the Morehead State University, where he graduated in 2001 and had one collegiate title

== Professional career ==
In 2001, Teater turned professional. He bounced around on the mini-tours from 2001 to 2009 until he joined the Nationwide Tour.

Teater found success in his Nationwide Tour rookie season. He finished runner-up to Michael Sim at the Christmas in October Classic and won the Utah Championship in September. He finished 7th on the money list to earn his 2010 PGA Tour card and finished 89th in 2010 to retain his PGA Tour card.

== Professional wins (2) ==
=== Korn Ferry Tour wins (2) ===
No.	Date	Tournament	Winning score	Margin of victory	Runner(s)-up
1	Sep 13, 2009	Utah Championship	−20 (65-67-64-68=264)	4 strokes	(United States) Tyler Aldridge
2	Feb 2, 2025	Panama Championship	−9 (68-70-68-65=271)	2 strokes	(United States) Nick Gabrelcik, (United States) Johnny Keefer, (United States) Dylan Wu

Korn Ferry Tour playoff record (0–1)

No.	Year	Tournament	Opponent	Result
1	2023	BMW Charity Pro-Am	(Belgium) Adrien Dumont de Chassart	Lost to par on first extra hole

== Results in major championships ==
Tournament	2013
Masters Tournament	
U.S. Open	T56
The Open Championship	82
PGA Championship	T47

Did not play

"T" = tied

== See also ==
- 2009 Nationwide Tour graduates
- 2018 Web.com Tour Finals graduates
- 2023 Korn Ferry Tour graduates
