= 2019 PGA Tour Canada =

Golf tour season

2019 PGA Tour Canada season
- Duration: May 23, 2019 – September 15, 2019
- Number of official events: 12
- Most wins: (France) Paul Barjon (2) (United States) Jake Knapp (2) (Canada) Taylor Pendrith (2)
- Order of Merit: (France) Paul Barjon

The 2019 PGA Tour Canada, titled as the 2019 Mackenzie Tour-PGA Tour Canada for sponsorship reasons, was the 34th season of the Canadian Tour, and the seventh under the operation and running of the PGA Tour.

== Schedule ==
The following table lists official events during the 2019 season.

Date	Tournament	Location	Purse (C$)	Winner (Note: The number in parentheses after each winner's name is the number of PGA Tour Canada events they had won up to and including that tournament. It is rare for someone to accumulate many wins on PGA Tour Canada as success at this level usually leads to promotion to the Korn Ferry Tour.)	OWGR points
May 26	Canada Life Open	British Columbia	200,000	(United States) Jake Knapp (1)	6
Jun 2	Bayview Place DCBank Open	British Columbia	200,000	(France) Paul Barjon (2)	6
Jun 16	GolfBC Championship	British Columbia	200,000	(United States) Jake Knapp (2)	6
Jun 23	Lethbridge Paradise Canyon Open	Alberta	200,000	(United States) Alex Chiarella (1)	6
Jul 7	Windsor Championship	Ontario	200,000	(United States) Dawson Armstrong (1)	6
Jul 14	Osprey Valley Open	Ontario	200,000	(France) Paul Barjon (3)	6
Jul 21	HFX Pro-Am	Nova Scotia	200,000	(United States) Lorens Chan (1)	6
Aug 4	1932byBateman Open	Alberta	200,000	(Canada) Taylor Pendrith (1)	6
Aug 11	ATB Financial Classic	Alberta	200,000	(United States) Hayden Buckley (1)	6
Aug 18	The Players Cup	Manitoba	200,000	(United States) Derek Barron (1)	6
Sep 8	Mackenzie Investments Open	Quebec	200,000	(Canada) Taylor Pendrith (2)	6
Sep 15	Canada Life Championship	Ontario	225,000	(United States) Patrick Fishburn (1)	6

== Order of Merit ==
The Order of Merit was based on prize money won during the season, calculated in Canadian dollars. The top five players on the Order of Merit earned status to play on the 2020–21 Korn Ferry Tour.

Position	Player	Prize money (C$)
1	(France) Paul Barjon	127,336
2	(Canada) Taylor Pendrith	124,590
3	(United States) Jake Knapp	120,925
4	(United States) Lorens Chan	116,541
5	(United States) Patrick Fishburn	81,140

== See also ==
- 2019 PGA Tour China
- 2019 PGA Tour Latinoamérica
