= Ryan McCormick =

American professional golfer (born 1991)

Personal information
- Nationality: United States
- Born: November 7, 1991 (age 34) West Long Branch, New Jersey, U.S.
- Height: 6 ft 0 in (183 cm)
- Weight: 190 lb (86 kg)

Career
- Sport: Golf
- College: St. John's University
- Turned professional: 2014
- Current tour: Korn Ferry Tour
- Former tours: PGA Tour; PGA Tour Canada; PGA Tour Latinoamérica

Best results in major championships
- Masters Tournament: DNP
- PGA Championship: DNP
- U.S. Open: T50: 2025
- The Open Championship: DNP

Ryan McCormick (born November 7, 1991) is an American professional golfer who currently plays on the Korn Ferry Tour.

== Early life and career ==
Raised in Middletown Township, New Jersey, McCormick attended Mater Dei High School, where he was captain of the school's golf team all four years.

McCormick competed for the St. John's Red Storm in college, winning Big East Conference team and individual titles in 2014.

== Professional career ==
McCormick finished 27th in the Korn Ferry Tour points list for the 2023 season to earn status for the 2024 PGA Tour season.

== Personal life ==
McCormick is an avid video game player and uses the PGA Tour 2K Series to create and scout courses he is playing.

== Amateur wins ==
- 2012 New Jersey Amateur, Metropolitan Amateur
- 2013 Cobra-Puma Invitational
- 2014 Snowman Getaway, Big East Championship

== Results in major championships ==
Tournament	2025
Masters Tournament	
PGA Championship	
U.S. Open	T50
The Open Championship	

Did not play

"T" = tied

== See also ==
- 2023 Korn Ferry Tour graduates
