= Tom Whitney =

American professional golfer (born 1989)

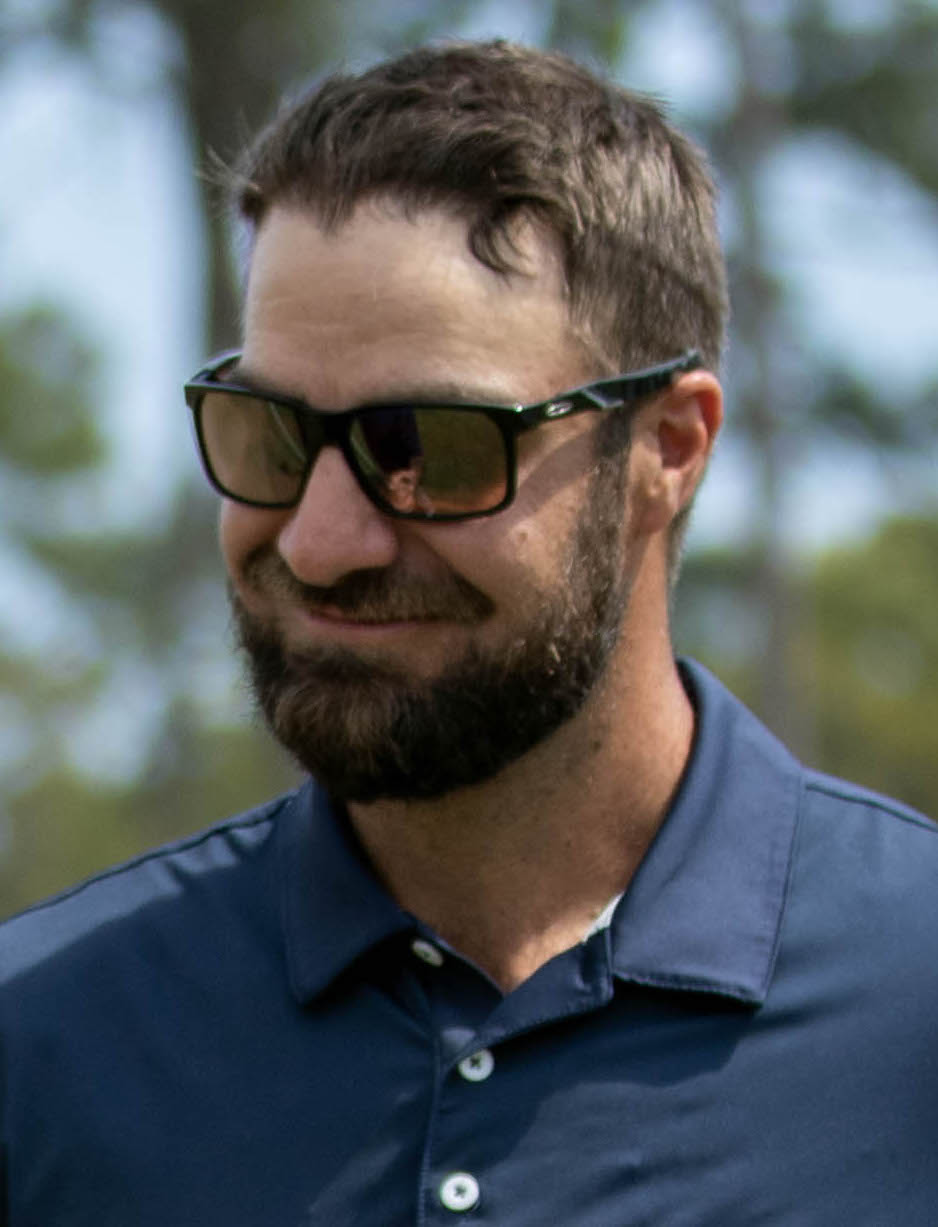
- Whitney in 2023

Personal information
- Nationality: United States
- Born: May 16, 1989 (age 37) South Lake Tahoe, California, U.S.
- Height: 6 ft 3 in (1.91 m)
- Weight: 215 lb (98 kg)
- Spouse: Jessica
- Children: 3

Career
- Sport: Golf
- College: United States Air Force Academy
- Turned professional: 2010
- Current tour: Korn Ferry Tour
- Former tours: PGA Tour; PGA Tour Latinoamérica; Gateway Tour
- Professional wins: 11

Tom Whitney (born May 16, 1989) is an American professional golfer.

== Amateur career ==
Whitney was born in South Lake Tahoe, California and lives in Little Elm, Texas. He attended La Quinta High School in La Quinta, California. After high school, he attended the United States Air Force Academy. Whitney won four collegiate tournaments and set four low-scoring school records in his college career. Whitney also competed in the 2009 U.S. Amateur Public Links and the 2009 U.S. Amateur. Whitney completed his college career as a two-time GCAA All-America Scholar and a finalist for the Byron Nelson Award.

== Military service ==
Whitney is a 2010 graduate of the United States Air Force Academy where he earned a Bachelor of Science Degree in Social Sciences. After his graduation from the academy he was commissioned as a Second Lieutenant in the United States Air Force in 2010 and rose to the rank of First Lieutenant while assigned to the 319th Missile Squadron at F.E. Warren Air Force Base in Wyoming. As an Air Force officer he served as a nuclear missile operator. After a four-year term of active duty in the Air Force, he left in May 2014 to pursue a career in professional golf.

== Military wins ==
Whitney won the Air Force Golf Championship four times, the Armed Forces Golf Championship three times and was the 2012 winner of the CISM World Military Golf Championship, making him one of the most successful golfers in the United States Air Force.

No.	Date	Tournament	Winning score	To par	Margin of victory	Runner-up
1	Oct 19, 2010	Air Force Golf Championship	279	–9		Mark Gardiner
2	Oct 26, 2010	Armed Forces Golf Championship	68-69-74-69=280	–8	8 strokes	Mark Gardiner
3	Sep 25, 2011	Air Force Golf Championship	62-65-65-63=255	–29	29 strokes	Jason Perry
4	Oct 2, 2011	Armed Forces Golf Championship	68-69-72-69=278	–10	9 strokes	Mark Gardiner
5	Oct 18, 2012	CISM World Military Golf Championship	70-66-67-67=270	–11	23 strokes	Adam Dickey
6	Sep 15, 2013	Armed Forces Golf Championship	67-71-73-70=281	–7	5 strokes	Andy Aduddell

== Professional career ==
Having turned professional after graduating from the US Air Force Academy, Whitney's first tournament was by means of a sponsor exemption at the 2010 Colorado Open. He made the cut and finished T32. In 2015 he made his first start on the Web.com Tour at the Utah Championship, where he made the cut and finished T63 having made the field via Monday qualifying. In 2016 he qualified for the PGA Tour Latinoamérica having missed out at the Web.com Tour qualifying school; he finished 11th on the money list to graduate to the Web.com Tour for 2017.

In 2017, Whitney gained his first start on the PGA Tour by winning the Monday qualifier for the Shriners Hospitals for Children Open. He finished the season ranked 89th on the Web.com Tour money list.

In 2018, having received a sponsor exemption into the PGA Tour's CareerBuilder Challenge, he made his first cut at the highest level and went on to finish T67. In 2019, Whitney won the Abierto OSDE del Centro on the PGA Tour Latinoamérica; he finished the season in second place on the tours Order of Merit to regain his place on the Korn Ferry Tour for the following season.

Whitney has also won ten tournaments on various mini-tours.

== Professional wins (11) ==
=== PGA Tour Latinoamérica wins (1) ===
No.	Date	Tournament	Winning score	Margin of victory	Runner-up
1	Apr 28, 2019	Abierto OSDE del Centro	−14 (73-67-66-64=270)	1 stroke	(United States) Nicolo Galletti

=== Gateway Tour wins (1) ===
No.	Date	Tournament	Winning score	Margin of victory	Runner-up
1	Nov 19, 2015	zTrip Classic	−10 (71-66-69=206)	4 strokes	(United States) Cory Renfrew

=== Mini-tour wins (4) ===
- 2011 Cimarron Golf Resort (Pepsi Tour)
- 2014 Avondale Open (eGolf Pro Tour West)
- 2015 Western North Dakota Charity Pro-Am (Dakotas Tour)
- 2016 Sun 'N Lake Golf Club (Swing Thought Tour)

=== Other wins (5) ===
- 2014 Oregon Trail Pro-Am
- 2015 Waterloo Open Golf Classic, Nevada Open
- 2016 Waterloo Open Golf Classic
- 2017 Sand Hollow Open

== Professional records ==
- Low first-round record at the Colorado Open with an opening round 64 on July 26, 2012
- Course record 64 at Jacksonville Naval Air Station (Red & White Course) on October 8, 2012

== Team appearances ==
- Aruba Cup (representing PGA Tour Latinoamérica): 2016 (winners)

== See also ==
- 2023 Korn Ferry Tour graduates
- List of United States Air Force Academy alumni
