= Parker Coody =

American professional golfer (born 2000)

Personal information
- Nationality: United States
- Born: January 7, 2000 (age 26) Plano, Texas, U.S.
- Height: 5 ft 9 in (1.75 m)
- Weight: 175 lb (79 kg; 12.5 st)

Career
- Sport: Golf
- College: University of Texas
- Turned professional: 2022
- Current tours: PGA Tour; Korn Ferry Tour
- Former tour: PGA Tour Canada
- Professional wins: 2

Parker Coody (/ˈku.di/ KOO-dee; born January 7, 2000) is an American professional golfer who currently plays on the Korn Ferry Tour. He played on the PGA Tour in 2024.

== Amateur career ==
As a high school student, Coody won the 2016 AJGA Abilene/Bob Estes Championship and the 2017 Texas State High School 6A Championship. He also participated in the US Amateur Championship.

Coody attended the University of Texas at Austin between 2018 and 2022, majoring in Corporate Communication. In 2019 he advanced to the Final 16 in the 2019 U.S. Amateur and the next year he won the Southern Highlands Collegiate. In 2021 he made it to the Final 32 of the 2022 U.S. Amateur. Playing with the Texas Longhorns men's golf team, he earned Honorable Mention All-American honors in 2019, 2021 and 2022; and helped the Longhorns win the 2022 NCAA Division I Men's Golf Championship. He lost a playoff for the individual title to Gordon Sargent and, as a result, earned GCAA All-America honors. He made the Big 12 All-Tournament Team and the Academic All-Big 12 team in 2021 and 2022.

== Professional career ==
Coody turned professional in 2022 and joined the PGA Tour Canada where he won the CentrePort Canada Rail Park Manitoba Open by 8 strokes.

In 2023, he joined the Korn Ferry Tour, where he was runner-up at the Price Cutter Charity Championship, 2 strokes behind his brother Pierceson.

In 2024, he earned his PGA Tour card by being one of the top 30 players on the 2023 Korn Ferry Tour points list. He and his brother Pierceson became the second pair of fraternal twins to hold PGA Tour membership simultaneously. Allan and Curtis Strange accomplished the feat in 1981. He played in 23 events, finishing in the top-10 once but did not finish in the top-125 of the FedEx points list to retain his card.

In 2025, he returned to the Korn Ferry Tour, but he only played in four events.

== Personal life ==
Coody has a twin brother, Pierceson, who is 37 minutes younger. Both are third-generation professional golfers. Their father Kyle played collegiately at the University of Texas and on the Asian Tour and Nike Tour in the 1990s. Their grandfather Charles played on the PGA Tour and won three times, including the 1971 Masters Tournament.

== Amateur wins ==
- 2016 Action Zone – Bob Estes Abilene Junior
- 2020 Southern Highlands Collegiate

== Professional wins (2) ==
=== PGA Tour Canada wins (1) ===
No.	Date	Tournament	Winning score	Margin of victory	Runner-up
1	Aug 21, 2022	CentrePort Canada Rail Park Manitoba Open	−27 (65-62-67-67=261)	8 strokes	(United States) Ian Holt

=== Other wins (1) ===
No.	Date	Tournament	Winning score	Margin of victory	Runner-up
1	Nov 23, 2022	TaylorMade Pebble Beach Invitational	−18 (69-68-64-69=270)	3 strokes	(United States) Lauren Stephenson

== See also ==
- 2023 Korn Ferry Tour graduates
