= Rafael Campos (golfer) =

Puerto Rican professional golfer (born 1988)

Personal information
- Full name: Rafael S. Campos
- Nickname: Rafa
- Nationality: Puerto Rico
- Born: April 15, 1988 (age 38) San Juan, Puerto Rico
- Height: 5 ft 10 in (178 cm)
- Weight: 210 lb (95 kg)

Career
- Sport: Golf
- College: Virginia Commonwealth University
- Turned professional: 2011
- Current tour: PGA Tour
- Former tours: Korn Ferry Tour; PGA Tour Latinoamérica; Tour de las Américas
- Professional wins: 2

Number of wins by tour
- PGA Tour: 1
- Korn Ferry Tour: 1

Best results in major championships
- Masters Tournament: CUT: 2025
- PGA Championship: T55: 2025
- U.S. Open: DNP
- The Open Championship: DNP

Rafael S. Campos (born April 15, 1988) is a Puerto Rican professional golfer who currently plays on the PGA Tour. He competed for Puerto Rico at the 2020 Summer Olympics and 2024 Summer Olympics.

== Early life ==
Campos was born in San Juan, Puerto Rico and started playing golf at age 9.

== Professional career ==
Campos turned professional in 2011 and the following year finished third on the Tour de las Américas Order of Merit. In 2015 he finished third on the PGA Tour Latinoamérica Order of Merit, allowing him to become a Web.com Tour member in 2016. He finished 111th on the Web.com Tour money list in 2016 and did not retain membership.

In March 2017, playing on a sponsor exemption, he tied for 10th at the Puerto Rico Open on the PGA Tour. This allowed him to compete in the following week's Shell Houston Open, where he finished 7th. In May he played the Web.com Tour's Corales Puntacana Resort and Club Championship on a sponsor exemption and tied for third; a tie for 11th at the following event gave him Special Temporary Membership on the Web.com Tour, and he finished the season 57th on the money list, giving him full membership for 2018.

In 2018, Campos finished runner-up at the Panama Championship, 2 shots behind Scott Langley.

In January 2019, Campos claimed his first professional victory at The Bahamas Great Abaco Classic on the Web.com Tour. He was the first Puerto Rican to win on the Web.com Tour. He finished 18th on the regular-season points list and earned a PGA Tour card for the 2019–20 season.

Campos played in nine events on the PGA Tour in 2019–20 before a back injury caused him to miss the rest of the season (including missing the Puerto Rico Open for the first time since its inception in 2008). Due to the adjustments to PGA Tour eligibility as a result of the COVID-19 pandemic, he was able to retain membership in 2020–21 without having to rely on a medical extension.

In February 2021, Campos recorded his best finish on the PGA Tour at the time, with a tie for 3rd at the Puerto Rico Open. He had held a share of the lead after 54 holes. A few weeks later, Campos was in contention to win again at the Corales Puntacana Resort and Club Championship. He eventually finished tied for 2nd, one shot behind Joel Dahmen.

In November 2024, Campos claimed his first victory on the PGA Tour at the Butterfield Bermuda Championship.

== Professional wins (2) ==
=== PGA Tour wins (1) ===
No.	Date	Tournament	Winning score	Margin of victory	Runner-up
1	Nov 17, 2024	Butterfield Bermuda Championship	−19 (70-65-62-68=265)	3 strokes	(United States) Andrew Novak

=== Korn Ferry Tour wins (1) ===
No.	Date	Tournament	Winning score	Margin of victory	Runner-up
1	Jan 23, 2019	The Bahamas Great Abaco Classic	−7 (70-69-72-70=281)	1 stroke	(United States) Vince Whaley

== Results in major championships ==
Tournament	2025
Masters Tournament	CUT
PGA Championship	T55
U.S. Open	
The Open Championship	

Did not play

CUT = missed the half-way cut

== Results in The Players Championship ==
Tournament	2025
The Players Championship	CUT

CUT = missed the half-way cut

== See also ==
- 2019 Korn Ferry Tour Finals graduates
- 2023 Korn Ferry Tour graduates
