= Brandon Harkins =

American professional golfer (born 1986)

Personal information
- Full name: Brandon Daniel Harkins
- Nationality: United States
- Born: July 13, 1986 (age 40) Lafayette, California, U.S.
- Height: 6 ft 0 in (1.83 m)
- Weight: 185 lb (84 kg; 13.2 st)

Career
- Sport: Golf
- Turned professional: 2010
- Current tour: Korn Ferry Tour
- Former tours: PGA Tour; PGA Tour Canada; PGA Tour Latinoamérica; Gateway Tour
- Professional wins: 3

Number of wins by tour
- Korn Ferry Tour: 1
- Other: 2

Best results in major championships
- Masters Tournament: DNP
- PGA Championship: DNP
- U.S. Open: T59: 2016
- The Open Championship: DNP

Brandon Daniel Harkins (born July 13, 1986) is an American professional golfer who currently plays on the Korn Ferry Tour. Harkins previously played on PGA Tour, PGA Tour Canada and PGA Tour Latinoamérica.

== Professional career ==
Harkins finished tied for 59th at the 2016 U.S. Open.

At the end of 2016, aged 30, Harkins finished 53rd in the Web.com Tour qualifying tournament. This earned him conditional status for the 2017 season. He finished his first Web.com Tour season in 21st place, and was promoted to the PGA Tour for 2018.

Harkins claimed his first professional victory in November 2021 at the TaylorMade Pebble Beach Invitational. He won by two shots ahead of Alex Čejka and Harry Hall.

In January 2022, Harkins won his first Korn Ferry tour event at The Bahamas Great Abaco Classic. Harkins won in a playoff over Dou Zecheng. This was Harkins' first win in 134 Korn Ferry starts.

== Professional wins (3) ==
=== Korn Ferry Tour wins (1) ===
No.	Date	Tournament	Winning score	Margin of victory	Runners-up
1	Jan 26, 2022	The Bahamas Great Abaco Classic	−18 (69-65-68-68=270)	Playoff	(China) Dou Zecheng

Korn Ferry Tour playoff record (1–0)

No.	Year	Tournament	Opponent	Result
1	2022	The Bahamas Great Abaco Classic	(China) Dou Zecheng	Won with par on second extra hole

=== Gateway Tour wins (1) ===
- 2015 Winter 4

=== Other wins (1) ===
No.	Date	Tournament	Winning score	Margin of victory	Runners-up
1	Nov 21, 2021	TaylorMade Pebble Beach Invitational	−21 (63-67-71-66=267)	2 strokes	(Germany) Alex Čejka, (England) Harry Hall

== See also ==
- 2017 Web.com Tour Finals graduates
