= Justin Hastings =

Caymanian professional golfer (born 2003)

Personal information
- Nationality: Cayman Islands
- Born: 18 September 2003 (age 23)
- Height: 5 ft 11 in (180 cm)

Career
- Sport: Golf
- College: San Diego State University
- Turned professional: 2025
- Current tour: Korn Ferry Tour
- Former tour: PGA Tour Americas

Best results in major championships
- Masters Tournament: CUT: 2025
- PGA Championship: DNP
- U.S. Open: T55: 2025
- The Open Championship: CUT: 2025

Justin Hastings (born 18 September 2003) is a Caymanian professional golfer. He won the 2025 Latin America Amateur Championship.

== College career ==
Hastings competed for the San Diego State Aztecs men's golf team.

== Amateur career ==
Hastings won the 2018 Caribbean Amateur Golf Championships (Hoerman Cup).

He participated in the 2023 Pan American Games, finishing tied for 11th place in the men's competition.

He made his major championship debut at the 2025 Masters Tournament. At his next major, the 2025 U.S. Open, he made the cut and was the low amateur by virtue of being the only amateur to make the cut.

== Professional career ==
Hastings turned professional in July 2025 and started competing on the PGA Tour Americas.

== Amateur wins ==
- 2020 CIGA Match Play Invitational
- 2021 Coach Invitational
- 2022 UC San Diego Invitational, GT Summer Series - Event 1, GT Coach Invitational
- 2023 GT Summer Series - Event 1, GT Summer Series - Event 2, Mirabel Maui Jim Intercollegiate, GT Fall Classic
- 2024 GT Coach Invitational
- 2025 Latin America Amateur Championship, Lamkin Invitational, Credit Union 1 Mountain West Men’s Golf Championship

== Results in major championships ==
Tournament	2025
Masters Tournament	CUT
PGA Championship	
U.S. Open	T55LA
The Open Championship	CUT

Did not play

LA = low amateur
CUT = missed the half-way cut
"T" = tied

== Team appearances ==
- Arnold Palmer Cup (representing International team): 2025 (winners)
