= Nationwide Children's Hospital Championship =

Tournament information
- Location: Columbus, Ohio
- Established: 2007
- Course: Ohio State University Golf Club
- Par: 71
- Length: 7,455 yards (6,817 m)
- Tour: Korn Ferry Tour
- Format: Stroke play
- Prize fund: US$1,500,000
- Month played: September

Tournament record score
- Aggregate: 267 Adam Svensson (2021); 267 David Lingmerth (2022)
- To par: −17 as above

Current champion
- (Scotland) Sandy Scott

Location map
- Location in the United States Location in Ohio

The Nationwide Children's Hospital Championship is a golf tournament on the Korn Ferry Tour. It was played for the first time in July 2007 at The Ohio State University Golf Club's Scarlet Course in Upper Arlington, Ohio.

The first six years of the event were unique in that it invited the top collegiate golfers to compete. Amateurs won two of the six events.

Since 2013, it has been part of the Korn Ferry Tour Finals and the field consists of the top-132 players from the Korn Ferry Tour points list.

The 2026 purse is $1,000,000, with a $180,000 winner's share.

Since its inception in 2007, the Nationwide Children's Hospital Championship has raised nearly $33 million in support of pediatric cancer treatment and research at Nationwide Children’s Hospital.

== Winners ==
Korn Ferry Tour (Current Finals system)	2023–
Korn Ferry Tour (Old Finals system)	2013–2019, 2021–22
Korn Ferry Tour (Championship Series)	2020
Korn Ferry Tour (Regular)	2007–2012

#	Year	Winner	Score	To par	Margin of victory	Runner(s)-up
Nationwide Children's Hospital Championship
20th	2026	(Scotland) Sandy Scott	266	−18	1 stroke	(United States) John Marshall Butler
19th	2025	(United States) John VanDerLaan	267	−17	3 strokes	(China) Dou Zecheng (United States) Trent Phillips
18th	2024	(United States) Frankie Capan III	271	−13	2 strokes	(United States) Carter Jenkins (United States) William Mouw (Germany) Thomas Rosenmüller
17th	2023	(United States) **Norman Xiong**	274	−10	4 strokes	(United States) **Joe Highsmith** (Australia) Curtis Luck (United States) Chris Petefish
16th	2022	(Sweden) David Lingmerth	267	−17	2 strokes	(United States) Paul Haley II
15th	2021	(Canada) Adam Svensson	267	−17	2 strokes	(United States) Bronson Burgoon (Germany) Stephan Jäger
14th	2020	(Australia) Curtis Luck	273	−11	1 stroke	(United States) Theo Humphrey (United States) Taylor Montgomery (United States) **Cameron Young**
13th	2019	(United States) Scottie Scheffler	272	−12	2 strokes	(United States) Beau Hossler (England) Ben Taylor (United States) Brendon Todd
12th	2018	(United States) Robert Streb	272	−12	Playoff	(United States) Peter Malnati
11th	2017	(United States) Peter Uihlein	270	−14	1 stroke	(United States) Ryan Armour
10th	2016	(United States) Grayson Murray	272	−12	1 stroke	(Australia) Cameron Smith
9th	2015	(United States) Andrew Loupe	279	−5	2 strokes	(United States) Bronson Burgoon (United States) Roberto Castro (United States) Tom Hoge
8th	2014	(United States) Justin Thomas	278	−6	Playoff	(South Africa) Richard Sterne
7th	2013	(South Korea) Noh Seung-yul	272	−12	5 strokes	(United States) Edward Loar
Nationwide Children's Hospital Invitational
6th	2012	(United States) **Ben Kohles**	272	−12	Playoff	(United States) **Luke Guthrie**
5th	2011	(United States) Harris English (a)	270	−14	1 stroke	(United States) John Peterson (a) (United States) **Kyle Reifers**
4th	2010	(United States) **D. J. Brigman**	274	−10	1 stroke	(United States) **Jamie Lovemark**
3rd	2009	(United States) **Derek Lamely**	273	−11	Playoff	(United States) Rickie Fowler (a)
2nd	2008	(United States) **Bill Lunde**	279	−5	1 stroke	(United States) Dustin Bray
1st	2007	(United States) Daniel Summerhays (a)	278	−6	2 strokes	(United States) **Chad Collins** (United States) Chris Nallen

Bolded golfers graduated to the PGA Tour via the Korn Ferry Tour regular-season money list, in years that the event was not part of the old Korn Ferry Tour Finals system. In years that the event was part of that system, all winners and runners-up earned PGA Tour cards.
