= Norman Xiong =

American professional golfer (born 1998)

Personal information
- Nickname: The Panda
- Nationality: United States
- Born: November 9, 1998 (age 27) Guam
- Height: 6 ft 1 in (1.85 m)
- Weight: 185 lb (84 kg; 13.2 st)

Career
- Sport: Golf
- College: University of Oregon
- Turned professional: 2018
- Current tour: PGA Tour
- Former tour: Korn Ferry Tour
- Professional wins: 2

Number of wins by tour
- Korn Ferry Tour: 2

Achievements and awards
- Haskins Award: 2018

Norman Xiong (born November 9, 1998) is an American professional golfer.

== Early life ==
Xiong was born in Guam to Hmong parents. He moved to San Diego, California when he was six with his mother, Jing, and uncle, James Xiong. He participated in the Pro Kids | First Tee Program in San Diego founded by Ernie Wright. His uncle served as his golf coach from an early age.

== Amateur career ==
Xiong attended Temescal Canyon High School in Lake Elsinore, California. While in high school he won the Junior world championship, the Junior PGA Championship, was a first-team American Junior Golf Association All-American, and was the top junior golf prospect in California.

He left high school early to attend Oregon beginning in January 2017. In his first semester he won the Phil Mickelson Award as the nation's top freshman. Xiong won the Western Amateur in August by defeating Doc Redman, who would win the U.S. Amateur, after 22 holes.

At the 2017 U.S. Amateur, Xiong finished second in qualifying after shooting a round of 64, but was defeated in the opening round of match-play. He was selected for the American team at the 2017 Walker Cup, compiling a record of 3–0–1 as the Americans won the cup.

In 2018 he won the Jack Nicklaus Award as the Division I men's golfer of the year. He also received the Haskins Award as the most outstanding collegiate golfer.

Xiong's amateur success led his coach at Oregon, Casey Martin, to compare him to Tiger Woods at the same age.

== Professional career ==
Xiong announced he was turning professional in May 2018. He made his professional debut at U.S. Open sectional qualifying on June 4.

On December 9, Xiong finished second in Korn Ferry Tour qualifying to earn his card for 2019. He made just five cuts in 21 events in his rookie season and lost his KFT status after shooting 81 in the first round of Q-School.

In July 2021, Xiong was a Monday qualifier for the 3M Open, his first start on the PGA Tour in more than two years.

In June 2022, Xiong won the Korn Ferry Tour's Wichita Open after Monday qualifying, giving him full status on that tour. A win the following year at the Nationwide Children's Hospital Championship ensured he would earn a PGA Tour card for the 2024 season.

== Amateur wins ==
- 2014 Sunriver Junior Open, Junior All-Star Invitational
- 2016 Thunderbird International Junior, Junior PGA Championship, Sunriver Junior Open
- 2017 Wyoming Desert Intercollegiate, Western Amateur, Rod Myers Invitational, Nike Collegiate Invite
- 2018 The Goodwin, Oregon Duck Invitational, Annual Western Intercollegiate, NCAA Pacific Regional

== Professional wins (2) ==
=== Korn Ferry Tour wins (2) ===
Legend
Finals events (1)
Other Korn Ferry Tour (1)

No.	Date	Tournament	Winning score	Margin of victory	Runner(s)-up
1	Jun 19, 2022	Wichita Open	−26 (66-61-64-63=254)	5 strokes	(United States) Kevin Roy
2	Sep 24, 2023	Nationwide Children's Hospital Championship	−10 (69-67-71-67=274)	4 strokes	(United States) Joe Highsmith, (Australia) Curtis Luck, (United States) Chris Petefish

== U.S. national team appearances ==
Amateur

- Junior Ryder Cup: 2016 (winners)
- Palmer Cup: 2017 (winners)
- Walker Cup: 2017 (winners)

== See also ==
- 2023 Korn Ferry Tour graduates
