= Ben Kohles =

American professional golfer (born 1990)

Personal information
- Nationality: United States
- Born: February 24, 1990 (age 36) Dallas, Texas, U.S.
- Height: 6 ft 2 in (1.88 m)
- Weight: 170 lb (77 kg; 12 st)

Career
- Sport: Golf
- College: University of Virginia
- Turned professional: 2012
- Current tours: PGA Tour; Korn Ferry Tour
- Professional wins: 5
- Highest ranking: 78 (August 4, 2024) (as of October 25, 2026)

Number of wins by tour
- Korn Ferry Tour: 5 (Tied-7th all-time)

Best results in major championships
- Masters Tournament: DNP
- PGA Championship: T26: 2024
- U.S. Open: T23: 2026
- The Open Championship: DNP

Achievements and awards
- Korn Ferry Tour points list winner: 2023
- Korn Ferry Tour Player of the Year: 2023

Ben Kohles (born February 24, 1990) is an American professional golfer who currently plays on the PGA Tour.

== Career ==
Kohles was born in Dallas, Texas. He attended Green Hope High School in Cary, North Carolina. He played college golf at the University of Virginia where he won five events and was a three-time All-American and twice was ACC Player of the Year.

Kohles turned professional in July 2012 and won the first professional event he entered, the Nationwide Children's Hospital Invitational on the Web.com Tour. He won in a playoff over Luke Guthrie, with a birdie at the first extra hole to take victory. He was invited to the tournament because of his collegiate All-American status. He became the first player to win on his Web.com Tour debut since 2007 and the thirteenth overall that have achieved the feat; he is also the first without prior professional tournament experience. Kohles then won the following week at the Cox Classic, shooting a final round 62 to take the title by three shots. He became the first player in the history of the tour to win both of the first two tournaments he played. The win moved him to second on the Web.com Tour money list, which guaranteed that he would finish in the top 25 on the tour and receive a PGA Tour card for 2013.

Kohles made his PGA Tour debut at the 2012 Wyndham Championship. Kohles was unable to maintain his Tour privileges and was playing on the third-tier PGA Tour Latinoamérica in 2016.

== Amateur wins ==
- 2012 Dogwood Invitational

== Professional wins (5) ==
=== Korn Ferry Tour wins (5) ===
No.	Date	Tournament	Winning score	To par	Margin of victory	Runner-up
1	Jul 29, 2012	Nationwide Children's Hospital Invitational	66-69-67-70=272	−12	Playoff	(United States) Luke Guthrie
2	Aug 5, 2012	Cox Classic	65-66-67-62=260	−24	3 strokes	(South Africa) Dawie van der Walt
3	Apr 2, 2023	Astara Chile Classic	68-66-66-67=267	−21	Playoff	(Australia) Dimitrios Papadatos
4	Apr 30, 2023	HomeTown Lenders Championship	68-62-67=197 (Note: Shortened to 54 holes due to weather.)	−13	Playoff	(Canada) Ben Silverman
5	Jun 7, 2026	BMW Charity Pro-Am	68-65-64-71=268	−15	4 strokes	(United States) Logan McAllister

Korn Ferry Tour playoff record (3–0)

No.	Year	Tournament	Opponent	Result
1	2012	Nationwide Children's Hospital Invitational	(United States) Luke Guthrie	Won with birdie on first extra hole
2	2023	Astara Chile Classic	(Australia) Dimitrios Papadatos	Won with birdie on second extra hole
3	2023	HomeTown Lenders Championship	(Canada) Ben Silverman	Won with birdie on second extra hole

== Results in major championships ==
Tournament	2024	2025	2026
Masters Tournament			
PGA Championship	T26		
U.S. Open	T56		T23
The Open Championship			

Did not play

"T" indicates a tie for a place

== Results in The Players Championship ==
Tournament	2025
The Players Championship	CUT

CUT = missed the half-way cut

== See also ==
- 2012 Web.com Tour graduates
- 2021 Korn Ferry Tour Finals graduates
- 2023 Korn Ferry Tour graduates
- List of golfers with most Korn Ferry Tour wins
