= Chan Kim =

American professional golfer (born 1990)

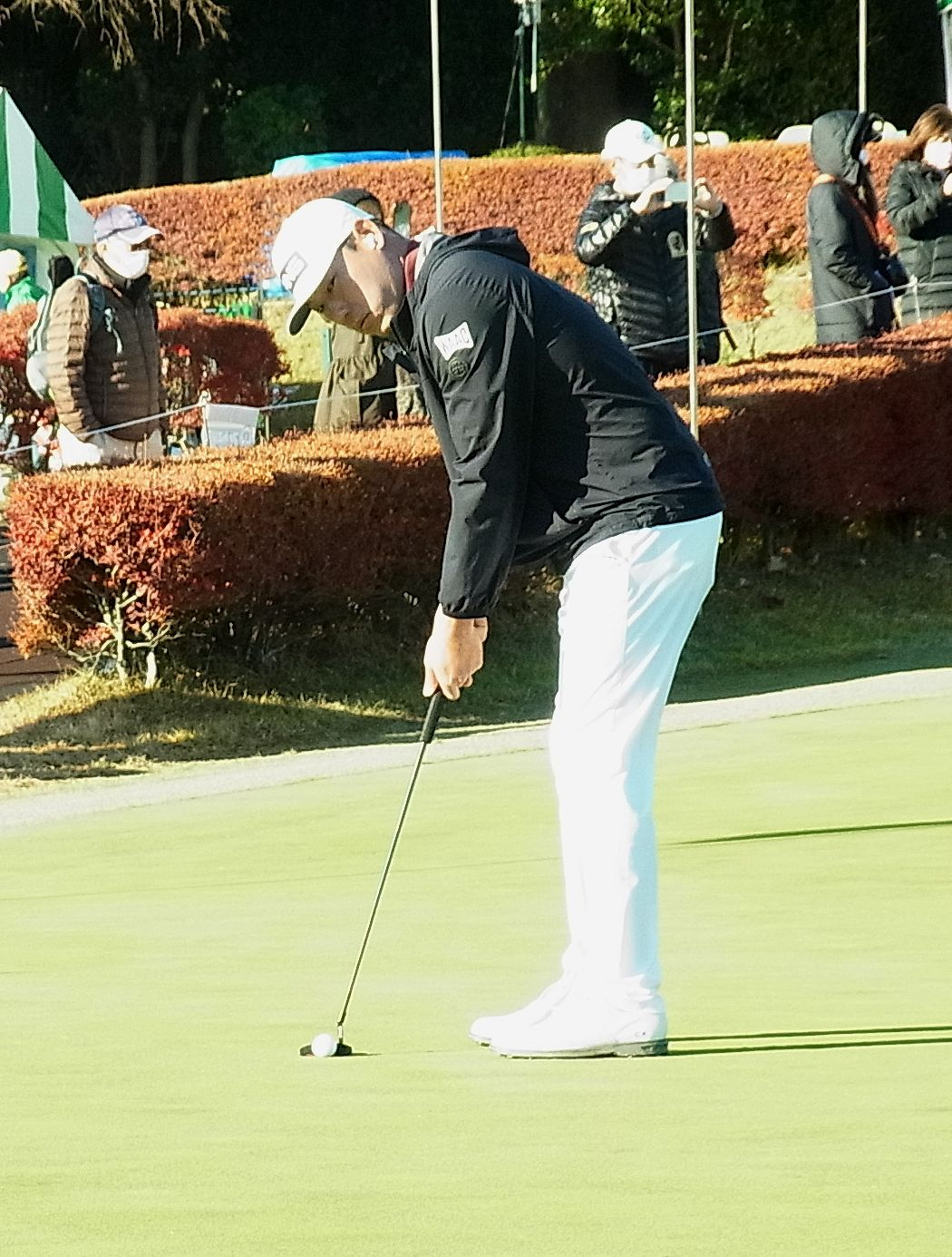

Personal information
- Nationality: United States
- Born: March 24, 1990 (age 36) Suwon, South Korea
- Height: 1.88 m (6 ft 2 in)
- Weight: 105 kg (231 lb; 16.5 st)

Career
- Sport: Golf
- College: Arizona State University
- Turned professional: 2010
- Current tours: PGA Tour; Korn Ferry Tour
- Former tours: Japan Golf Tour; Asian Tour; Challenge Tour; Canadian Tour
- Professional wins: 10
- Highest ranking: 61 (December 29, 2019) (as of October 25, 2026)

Number of wins by tour
- Japan Golf Tour: 8
- Korn Ferry Tour: 2

Best results in major championships
- Masters Tournament: DNP
- PGA Championship: T23: 2021
- U.S. Open: CUT: 2017, 2019, 2020, 2021, 2022
- The Open Championship: T11: 2017

Achievements and awards
- Japan Golf Tour Rookie of the Year: 2017
- Japan Golf Tour money list winner: 2020–21
- Japan Golf Tour Most Valuable Player: 2020–21

Chan Kim (born March 24, 1990) is an American professional golfer who currently plays on the PGA Tour. He formerly played on the Japan Golf Tour, where he won eight times, and the Korn Ferry Tour, where he won twice.

== Early life ==
Kim was born in Suwon, South Korea, but grew up in Hawaii.

== Amateur career ==
Kim played his college golf at Arizona State University.

He won the 2009 Pacific Coast Amateur. He was also a two-time winner of the Arizona Stroke Play Championship.

== Professional career ==
Kim played on the Canadian Tour in 2011. He played on the Challenge Tour in 2013 and the Asian Tour in 2013 and 2014. In 2013, he was runner-up at the Yeangder Tournament Players Championship. He has played on the Japan Golf Tour since 2015.

He won the Mizuno Open on the Japan Golf Tour to earn a spot in the 2017 Open Championship. Earlier that week he earned a qualifying spot to the 2017 U.S. Open. In early July, he won his second Japan Golf Tour event, the Shigeo Nagashima Invitational Sega Sammy Cup, after a bogey-free final round of 66.

In August 2023, Kim won his first event on the Korn Ferry Tour, winning the Magnit Championship by three shots. He then won the Albertsons Boise Open the week after and by the end of the season, he secured his PGA Tour Card for the next season by finishing 2nd on the points list.

== Amateur wins ==
- 2007 Hawaii Amateur
- 2008 Arizona Stroke Play Championship, Thunderbird International
- 2009 Pacific Coast Amateur
- 2010 Arizona Stroke Play Championship

== Professional wins (10) ==
=== Japan Golf Tour wins (8) ===
Legend
Flagship events (1)
Japan majors (2) (Note: The 2019 Japan Open Golf Championship was also a Japan major championship.)
Other Japan Golf Tour (6)

No.	Date	Tournament	Winning score	Margin of victory	Runner(s)-up
1	May 28, 2017	Gateway to The Open Mizuno Open	−15 (68-70-67-68=273)	5 strokes	(New Zealand) Michael Hendry
2	Jul 9, 2017	Shigeo Nagashima Invitational Sega Sammy Cup	−18 (67-70-67-66=270)	1 stroke	(South Korea) Hwang Jung-gon
3	Nov 5, 2017	Heiwa PGM Championship	−6 (67-70-72-69=278)	1 stroke	(Japan) Yuta Ikeda, (South Korea) Song Young-han
4	Oct 20, 2019	Japan Open Golf Championship	+1 (74-69-75-67=285)	1 stroke	(Japan) Mikumu Horikawa, (South Africa) Shaun Norris
5	Dec 6, 2020	Golf Nippon Series JT Cup	−8 (66-66-73-67=272)	1 stroke	(Japan) Hiroshi Iwata, (Japan) Tomoharu Otsuki, (Japan) Hideto Tanihara
6	Oct 3, 2021	Vantelin Tokai Classic	−14 (64-68-69-69=270)	2 strokes	(Japan) Yuta Ikeda, (Japan) Jinichiro Kozuma, (Japan) Tomoharu Otsuki
7	Nov 21, 2021	Dunlop Phoenix Tournament	−17 (69-69-66-63=267)	1 stroke	(Japan) Naoyuki Kataoka, (Japan) Ryosuke Kinoshita
8	Nov 27, 2022	Casio World Open	−32 (64-66-64-62=256)	6 strokes	(Japan) Aguri Iwasaki

=== Korn Ferry Tour wins (2) ===
Legend
Finals events (1)
Other Korn Ferry Tour (1)

No.	Date	Tournament	Winning score	Margin of victory	Runner-up
1	Aug 20, 2023	Magnit Championship	−20 (70-66-68-64=268)	3 strokes	(United States) Taylor Dickson
2	Aug 27, 2023	Albertsons Boise Open	−28 (66-62-64-64=256)	2 strokes	(United States) David Kocher

== Results in major championships ==
Results not in chronological order in 2020.

Tournament	2017	2018
Masters Tournament		
U.S. Open	CUT	
The Open Championship	T11	
PGA Championship		

Tournament	2019	2020	2021	2022
Masters Tournament				
PGA Championship		CUT	T23	CUT
U.S. Open	CUT	CUT	CUT	CUT
The Open Championship	CUT	NT	T53	CUT

Did not play

CUT = missed the half-way cut
"T" indicates a tie for a place
NT = No tournament due to COVID-19 pandemic

== Results in World Golf Championships ==
Tournament	2017	2018	2019	2020	2021
Championship					T35
Match Play				NT^{1}	
Invitational					
Champions	T58		T46	NT^{1}	NT^{1}

^{1}Cancelled due to COVID-19 pandemic

Did not play

NT = No tournament
"T" = Tied

== Results in The Players Championship ==
Tournament	2025
The Players Championship	CUT

CUT = missed the half-way cut

== See also ==
- 2023 Korn Ferry Tour graduates
