= Paul Barjon =

French professional golfer (born 1992)

Personal information
- Nationality: France
- Born: 19 September 1992 (age 34) Bordeaux, France
- Height: 6 ft 1 in (1.85 m)
- Weight: 185 lb (84 kg; 13.2 st)
- Spouse: Katrina Barjon (m. 2019)
- Children: 2

Career
- Sport: Golf
- College: Texas Christian University
- Turned professional: 2016
- Current tour: PGA Tour
- Former tours: Korn Ferry Tour; PGA Tour Canada
- Professional wins: 6

Number of wins by tour
- Korn Ferry Tour: 3
- Other: 3

Best results in major championships
- Masters Tournament: DNP
- PGA Championship: DNP
- U.S. Open: CUT: 2020, 2021, 2023
- The Open Championship: DNP

Achievements and awards
- PGA Tour Canada Order of Merit winner: 2019

Paul Barjon (born 19 September 1992) is a French professional golfer, who won the 2019 PGA Tour Canada Order of Merit.

== Early life and amateur career ==
Barjon was born in Bordeaux, France to parents Alain and Marie. However, he grew up in New Caledonia, a French territory in the Pacific. He has a brother named Louis.

As a youth, he won the 2009 New Caledonia Amateur Championship, 2010 Grand Prix of Baron, and 2011 French Club Team Championship. He attended high school at Lycée Polyvalent in Antibes, France. In November 2011, Barjon signed a letter of intent to play for Texas Christian University.

At the age of 18, he was at #105 in the World Amateur Golf Ranking. In 2012, he won the stroke-play portion of the Italian Amateur. In 2012, he won the Scottish Amateur Stroke Play Championship. He also reached the round of 16 at the 2012 Amateur Championship. Barjon represented France at the 2012 Eisenhower Trophy in Antalya, Turkey, were his team were tied bronze medalists.

The following year, he played for France at the 2013 European Amateur Team Championship in Silkeborg, Denmark, were his team earned a bronze medal. He also represented France at the 2014 European Amateur Team Championship.

In 2016, he finished runner-up at the Big 12 Championship for golf.

== Professional career ==
Barjon turned professional in 2016. In 2016, he played on the PGA Tour Canada. He won the Freedom 55 Financial Championship on the tour. Later in the year, he played on the 2016 Aruba Cup. In 2019, he again had much success in Canada. He won the Bayview Place DCBank Open and Osprey Valley Open on PGA Tour Canada and the Order of Merit.

Before the 2020 season, he qualified for the Korn Ferry Tour. He had much success that year. He finished in second place at the 2020 Mexico Championship. He also finished in second place at the WinCo Foods Portland Open. He qualified for the 2020 U.S. Open. Later in the season he played the 2021 Huntsville Championship at the Ledges in Huntsville, Alabama. He held the 54-hole lead at the tournament. At the end of regulation, he was tied with Billy Kennerly and Mito Pereira, which resulted in a sudden-death playoff. Kennerly bogeyed the second hole of the playoff to be eliminated. On the third playoff hole – played at the par-5 10th hole – Pereira made birdie. However, Barjon "poured in a 20-foot eagle putt for the win." It was his 25th event of the year. After three second-place finishes, he had finally won. Later in the year he qualified for the 2021 U.S. Open.

In 2022 he was tied for the 54-hole lead at The American Express, but shot a one-over 73 in the final round to finish at 10th place.

== Amateur wins ==
- 2012 Scottish Amateur Stroke Play Championship
- 2013 Stanford Intercollegiate
- 2015 Connecticut Cup
- 2016 Kingsmill Intercollegiate

== Professional wins (6) ==
=== Korn Ferry Tour wins (3) ===
Legend
Finals events (1)
Other Korn Ferry Tour (2)

No.	Date	Tournament	Winning score	Margin of victory	Runner(s)-up
1	2 May 2021	Huntsville Championship	−15 (65-67-64-69=265)	Playoff	(United States) Billy Kennerly, (Chile) Mito Pereira
2	2 Jul 2023	Memorial Health Championship	−26 (65-62-66-65=258)	1 stroke	(United States) Jackson Suber
3	8 Oct 2023	Korn Ferry Tour Championship	−14 (72-70-64-68=274)	3 strokes	(Argentina) Fabián Gómez

Korn Ferry Tour playoff record (1–1)

No.	Year	Tournament	Opponents	Result
1	2020	El Bosque Mexico Championship	(United States) David Kocher, (United States) Chad Ramey	Kocher won with birdie on first extra hole
2	2021	Huntsville Championship	(United States) Billy Kennerly, (Chile) Mito Pereira	Won with eagle on third extra hole

=== PGA Tour Canada wins (3) ===
No.	Date	Tournament	Winning score	Margin of victory	Runner-up
1	18 Sep 2016	Freedom 55 Financial Championship	−22 (63-66-61-68=258)	1 stroke	(French Polynesia) Vaita Guillaume
2	2 Jun 2019	Bayview Place DCBank Open	−19 (69-64-63-65=261)	1 stroke	(United States) Doc Redman
3	14 Jul 2019	Osprey Valley Open	−25 (64-66-66-67=263)	3 strokes	(Canada) Taylor Pendrith

== Results in major championships ==
Results not in chronological order in 2020.

Tournament	2020	2021	2022	2023
Masters Tournament				
PGA Championship				
U.S. Open	CUT	CUT		CUT
The Open Championship	NT			

Did not play

CUT = missed the half-way cut
NT = No tournament due to COVID-19 pandemic

== Team appearances ==
Amateur

- Eisenhower Trophy (representing France): 2012
- European Amateur Team Championship (representing France): 2013, 2014

== See also ==
- 2021 Korn Ferry Tour Finals graduates
- 2023 Korn Ferry Tour graduates
