= Joe Highsmith =

American professional golfer (born 2000)

Personal information
- Nationality: United States
- Born: April 19, 2000 (age 26) Lakewood, Washington, U.S.
- Height: 5 ft 9 in (175 cm)
- Weight: 150 lb (68 kg)

Career
- Sport: Golf
- College: Pepperdine University
- Turned professional: 2022
- Current tour: PGA Tour
- Former tours: Korn Ferry Tour; PGA Tour Canada
- Professional wins: 1
- Highest ranking: 59 (March 2, 2025) (as of October 25, 2026)

Number of wins by tour
- PGA Tour: 1

Best results in major championships
- Masters Tournament: CUT: 2025
- PGA Championship: T8: 2025
- U.S. Open: CUT: 2021, 2025
- The Open Championship: DNP

Achievements and awards
- West Coast Conference Freshman of the Year: 2019

Joe Highsmith (born April 19, 2000) is an American professional golfer who plays on the PGA Tour. He won the 2025 Cognizant Classic.

== Amateur career ==
In 2017, Highsmith won the Washington State Amateur Championship and was a member of the victorious Junior Presidents Cup U.S. team. In 2019, he won the Sahalee Players Championship.

Highsmith played college golf at Pepperdine University between 2018 and 2022, where he was West Coast Conference Freshman of the Year and a two-time All-American. He majored in communication studies and graduated with the golf program's fifth-best scoring average (71.45).

== Professional career ==
Highsmith turned professional in 2022 and joined the PGA Tour Canada, where he was runner-up at the 2022 ATB Classic. In 2023, he joined the Korn Ferry Tour, where his best results were tie for 3rd at the Korn Ferry Tour Championship and a runner-up finish at the Nationwide Children's Hospital Championship, which helped him graduate to the PGA Tour.

In his rookie PGA Tour season, he recorded a 5th place at the 2024 World Wide Technology Championship, before securing his first professional win at the 2025 Cognizant Classic with the lowest final 36-hole score in the tournament's history. Highsmith was the first golfer since 2016 to win a tournament after making the cut on the number.

== Amateur wins ==
- 2016 ACDS - Ryan Moore Junior at Oakbrook
- 2017 Washington State Amateur Championship
- 2019 Sahalee Players Championship
- 2021 Western Intercollegiate, Golf Club of Georgia Collegiate
- 2022 NCAA Bryan Regional

== Professional wins (1) ==
=== PGA Tour wins (1) ===
No.	Date	Tournament	Winning score	To par	Margin of victory	Runners-up
1	Mar 2, 2025	Cognizant Classic	65-72-64-64=265	−19	2 strokes	(United States) Jacob Bridgeman, (United States) J. J. Spaun

== Results in major championships ==
Tournament	2021	2022	2023	2024	2025	2026
Masters Tournament					CUT	
PGA Championship					T8	CUT
U.S. Open	CUT				CUT	
The Open Championship						

Top 10
Did not play

CUT = missed the half-way cut
"T" indicates a tie for a place

== Results in The Players Championship ==
Tournament	2025	2026
The Players Championship	T20	T42

"T" = tied

== U.S. national team appearances ==
- Junior Presidents Cup: 2017 (winners)

== See also ==
- 2023 Korn Ferry Tour graduates
