= Bermuda Championship =

Golf tournament on the PGA Tour

Butterfield Bermuda Championship

Tournament information
- Location: Southampton Parish, Bermuda
- Established: 2019
- Course: Port Royal Golf Course
- Par: 71
- Length: 6,828 yards (6,244 m)
- Tour: PGA Tour
- Format: Stroke play
- Prize fund: US$6,000,000
- Month played: November
- Website: butterfieldbdachampionship.com

Tournament record score
- Aggregate: 260 Brendon Todd (2019); 260 Camilo Villegas (2023)
- To par: −24 as above

Current champion
- (United States) Austin Smotherman

Location map
- Location in Bermuda

The Butterfield Bermuda Championship is a professional golf tournament on the PGA Tour that debuted in October/November 2019 as part of the 2020 season. The tournament is played at the Port Royal Golf Course, designed by Robert Trent Jones, in Southampton Parish, Bermuda. Originally designated as an alternate event, opposite the WGC-HSBC Champions, the prize fund in 2019 was US$3,000,000.

In 2020, 2021 and 2022, as a result of successive cancellations of the WGC-HSBC Champions due to COVID-19 pandemic considerations, the tournament was elevated to full FedEx Cup point event status, with the winner earning a Masters Tournament invitation. As a full-field tournament, the prize fund was US$4 million in the 2020, and US$6.5 million in 2021 as Butterfield Bank joined the Bermuda Tourism Board as co-title sponsors.

== Winners ==
Year	Winner	Score	To par	Margin of victory	Runner(s)-up	Purse ($)	Winner's share ($)
Butterfield Bermuda Championship
2026	(United States) Austin Smotherman	197 (Note: Shortened to 54 holes due to weather.)	−16	Playoff	(Republic of Ireland) Séamus Power	6,000,000	1,080,000
2025	(United States) Adam Schenk	272	−12	1 stroke	(United States) Chandler Phillips	6,000,000	1,080,000
2024	(Puerto Rico) Rafael Campos	265	−19	3 strokes	(United States) Andrew Novak	6,900,000	1,242,000
2023	(Colombia) Camilo Villegas	260	−24	2 strokes	(Sweden) Alex Norén	6,500,000	1,170,000
2022	(Republic of Ireland) Séamus Power	265	−19	1 stroke	(Belgium) Thomas Detry	6,500,000	1,170,000
2021	(Australia) Lucas Herbert	269	−15	1 stroke	(New Zealand) Danny Lee (United States) Patrick Reed	6,500,000	1,170,000
Bermuda Championship
2020	(United States) Brian Gay	269	−15	Playoff	(United States) Wyndham Clark	4,000,000	720,000
2019	(United States) Brendon Todd	260	−24	4 strokes	(United States) Harry Higgs	3,000,000	540,000
