= 2023 Korn Ferry Tour =

Golf tour season

2023 Korn Ferry Tour season
- Duration: January 15, 2023 – October 8, 2023
- Number of official events: 26
- Most wins: (France) Paul Barjon (2) (United States) Pierceson Coody (2) (United States) Chan Kim (2) (United States) Ben Kohles (2) (United States) Grayson Murray (2)
- Points list: (United States) Ben Kohles
- Player of the Year: (United States) Ben Kohles
- Rookie of the Year: (Belgium) Adrien Dumont de Chassart

The 2023 Korn Ferry Tour was the 33rd season of the Korn Ferry Tour, the official development tour to the PGA Tour.

== Changes for 2023 ==
Unlike in previous seasons, the Finals did not have a separate points list; the top 30 point winners through the entire season, including the Finals, earned PGA Tour cards. Those who finish 31-75 remain fully exempt on the Korn Ferry Tour for the next season. A rule change announced in December 2022 allowed for Korn Ferry Tour members that made the 36-hole cut in the U.S. Open to earn Korn Ferry Tour points equivalent to FedEx Cup points earned for their finish.

== Schedule ==
The following table lists official events during the 2023 season.

Date	Tournament	Location	Purse (US$)	Winner (Note: The number in parentheses after each winner's name is the number of Korn Ferry Tour events they had won up to and including that tournament. This information is only shown for Korn Ferry Tour members. It is rare for someone to accumulate many wins on the Korn Ferry Tour as success at this level usually leads to promotion to the PGA Tour.)	OWGR points	Notes
Jan 18	The Bahamas Great Exuma Classic	Bahamas	1,000,000	(United States) Chandler Phillips (1)	10.73	
Jan 25	The Bahamas Great Abaco Classic	Bahamas	1,000,000	(Canada) Ben Silverman (2)	10.70	
Feb 5	Panama Championship	Panama	1,000,000	(United States) Pierceson Coody (2)	11.11	
Feb 12	Astara Golf Championship	Colombia	1,000,000	(Australia) Rhein Gibson (2)	12.43	
Mar 26	Club Car Championship	Georgia	1,000,000	(England) David Skinns (3)	13.48	
Apr 2	Astara Chile Classic	Chile	1,000,000	(United States) Ben Kohles (3)	11.35	
Apr 16	Veritex Bank Championship	Texas	1,000,000	(United States) Spencer Levin (1)	13.75	
Apr 23	LECOM Suncoast Classic	Florida	1,000,000	(United States) Scott Gutschewski (3)	12.66	
Apr 30	HomeTown Lenders Championship	Alabama	1,000,000	(United States) Ben Kohles (4)	13.04	
May 21	AdventHealth Championship	Missouri	1,000,000	(United States) Grayson Murray (2)	13.93	
May 28	Visit Knoxville Open	Tennessee	1,000,000	(United States) Rico Hoey (1)	13.52	
Jun 4	UNC Health Championship	North Carolina	1,000,000	(Argentina) Jorge Fernández-Valdés (1)	13.73	
Jun 11	BMW Charity Pro-Am	South Carolina	1,000,000	(Belgium) Adrien Dumont de Chassart (1)	11.61	Pro-Am
Jun 18	Blue Cross and Blue Shield of Kansas Wichita Open	Kansas	1,000,000	(United States) Ricky Castillo (1)	10.80	
Jun 25	Compliance Solutions Championship	Oklahoma	1,000,000	(United States) Jimmy Stanger (1)	13.11	New tournament
Jul 2	Memorial Health Championship	Illinois	1,000,000	(France) Paul Barjon (2)	12.37	
Jul 16	The Ascendant	Colorado	1,000,000	(United States) Nicholas Lindheim (3)	14.58	
Jul 23	Price Cutter Charity Championship	Missouri	1,000,000	(United States) Pierceson Coody (3)	14.11	
Jul 30	NV5 Invitational	Illinois	1,000,000	(United States) Trace Crowe (1)	14.30	
Aug 6	Utah Championship	Utah	1,000,000	(Canada) Roger Sloan (2)	12.88	
Aug 13	Pinnacle Bank Championship	Nebraska	1,000,000	(Argentina) Alejandro Tosti (1)	15.12	
Aug 20	Magnit Championship	New Jersey	1,000,000	(United States) Chan Kim (1)	15.31	New tournament
Aug 27	Albertsons Boise Open	Idaho	1,500,000	(United States) Chan Kim (2)	15.19	Finals event
Sep 17	Simmons Bank Open	Tennessee	1,500,000	(United States) Grayson Murray (3)	15.13	Finals event
Sep 24	Nationwide Children's Hospital Championship	Ohio	1,500,000	(United States) Norman Xiong (2)	14.22	Finals event
Oct 8	Korn Ferry Tour Championship	Indiana	1,500,000	(France) Paul Barjon (3)	10.14	Finals event

== Points list ==
The points list was based on tournament results during the season, calculated using a points-based system. The top 30 players on the points list earned status to play on the 2024 PGA Tour.

Position	Player	Points
1	(United States) Ben Kohles	1,893
2	(United States) Chan Kim	1,592
3	(Argentina) Alejandro Tosti	1,560
4	(United States) Rico Hoey	1,559
5	(Canada) Ben Silverman	1,524

== Awards ==
Award	Winner	Ref.
Player of the Year (Jack Nicklaus Trophy)	(United States) Ben Kohles	
Rookie of the Year	(Belgium) Adrien Dumont de Chassart	
