= 2024 Players Championship =

Golf tournament

Tournament information
- Dates: March 14–17, 2024
- Location: Ponte Vedra Beach, Florida; 30.198°N 81.394°W
- Courses: TPC Sawgrass (Stadium Course)
- Tour: PGA Tour

Statistics
- Par: 72
- Field: 144 players, 73 after cut
- Cut: 143 (–1)
- Prize fund: US$25,000,000
- Winner's share: US$4,500,000

Champion
- (United States) Scottie Scheffler
- 268 (–20)

Location map
- Location in the United States Location in Florida

The 2024 Players Championship was a golf tournament on the PGA Tour, held at TPC Sawgrass in Ponte Vedra Beach, Florida from March 14–17. Officially, it was the 50th edition of The Players Championship tournament.

== Field ==
The field consists of 144 players meeting various criteria; they include tournament winners on the PGA Tour since the previous Players Championship, recent winners of major championships, The Players and World Golf Championships, and leading players in the FedEx Cup standings from the current and preceding seasons.

=== Eligibility criteria ===
This list details the eligibility criteria for the 2024 Players Championship and the players who qualified under them; any additional criteria under which players were eligible is indicated in parentheses. (Note: The player handbook and the "Inside the Field" page list the categories in different orders, but the players eligible are the same.)

1. Winners of PGA Tour events since the 2023 Players Championship

- Ludvig Åberg (2,15)
- Akshay Bhatia (2)
- Keegan Bradley (2,15)
- Sam Burns (2,10,15)
- Wyndham Clark (2,7,15,16)
- Corey Conners (2)
- Jason Day (2,15,16)
- Nick Dunlap
- Austin Eckroat (2,15)
- Tony Finau (2,15)
- Matt Fitzpatrick (2,7,15)
- Rickie Fowler (2,15)
- Brice Garnett
- Lucas Glover (2,15)
- Emiliano Grillo (2,15)
- Nick Hardy (2)
- Brian Harman (2,6,15)
- Lee Hodges (2)
- Viktor Hovland (2,9,14,15)
- Tom Kim (2,15)
- Chris Kirk (2,15,16)
- Jake Knapp (15,16)
- Luke List (2)
- Hideki Matsuyama (2,4,12,15,16)
- Rory McIlroy (2,5,9,15)
- Taylor Moore (2)
- Collin Morikawa (2,6,8,15)
- Grayson Murray
- Vincent Norrman (2)
- Matthieu Pavon (15,16)
- Davis Riley (2)
- Scottie Scheffler (2,4,5,10,13,15,16)
- Sepp Straka (2,15)
- Nick Taylor (2,15)
- Sahith Theegala (2,15)
- Erik van Rooyen (2)
- Camilo Villegas (2)
- Matt Wallace (2)

2. Top 125 from the previous season's FedEx Cup Fall Playoffs and Eligibility Points List

- Tyson Alexander
- An Byeong-hun (15,16)
- Aaron Baddeley
- Christiaan Bezuidenhout
- Zac Blair
- Joseph Bramlett
- Hayden Buckley
- Patrick Cantlay (9,14,15)
- Eric Cole (15)
- Joel Dahmen
- Cameron Davis
- Thomas Detry
- Tyler Duncan
- Nico Echavarría
- Harris English (15)
- Tommy Fleetwood (15)
- Doug Ghim
- Ben Griffin
- Chesson Hadley
- Adam Hadwin (15)
- Harry Hall
- Russell Henley (15)
- Garrick Higgo
- Tom Hoge
- Max Homa (15)
- Billy Horschel (10,14)
- Beau Hossler
- Mark Hubbard
- Mackenzie Hughes
- Im Sung-jae (15)
- Stephan Jäger
- Michael Kim
- Kim Seong-hyeon
- Kim Si-woo
- Kurt Kitayama (13,15)
- Matt Kuchar
- Martin Laird
- Nate Lashley
- Lee Kyoung-hoon
- David Lipsky
- Justin Lower
- Shane Lowry (6)
- Peter Malnati
- Ben Martin
- Denny McCarthy (15)
- Troy Merritt
- Keith Mitchell
- Taylor Montgomery
- Ryan Moore
- Matthew NeSmith
- Alex Norén
- Andrew Novak
- Taylor Pendrith
- J. T. Poston (15,16)
- Séamus Power
- Andrew Putnam
- Aaron Rai
- Chad Ramey
- Chez Reavie
- Patrick Rodgers
- Justin Rose (15)
- Sam Ryder
- Xander Schauffele (15,16)
- Adam Schenk
- Matti Schmid
- Adam Scott (15)
- Robby Shelton
- Greyson Sigg
- Alex Smalley
- J. J. Spaun
- Jordan Spieth (15)
- Scott Stallings
- Sam Stevens
- Kevin Streelman
- Justin Suh
- Adam Svensson
- Callum Tarren
- Ben Taylor
- Justin Thomas (5,8,15)
- Davis Thompson
- Brendon Todd
- Gary Woodland (7)
- Brandon Wu
- Dylan Wu
- Cameron Young (15)
- Carson Young
- Yu Chun-an
- Yuan Yechun
- Will Gordon, David Lingmerth, and Danny Willett did not play.

3. Top 125 (medical)

- Maverick McNealy
- Pan Cheng-tsung

4. Recent winners of the Masters Tournament (2019–2023)

- Tiger Woods did not play.

5. Recent winners of The Players Championship (2018–2023)

- Webb Simpson

6. Recent winners of The Open Championship (2018–2023)

- Francesco Molinari

7. Recent winners of the U.S. Open (2018–2023)

8. Recent winners of the PGA Championship (2018–2023)

9. Recent winners of the FedEx Cup (2019–2023)

10. Recent winners of the WGC Match Play (2021–2023)

11. Recent winners of the WGC Invitational (2021)

12. Recent winners of the Genesis Invitational (2022–2024)

13. Recent winners of the Arnold Palmer Invitational (2022–2024)

14. Recent winners of the Memorial Tournament (2021–2023)

15. Top 50 from the Official World Golf Ranking following the Cognizant Classic

- Ryan Fox
- Nicolai Højgaard
- Min Woo Lee
- Will Zalatoris

16. Top 10 in the current season's FedEx Cup points standings after the Cognizant Classic

17. Kaulig Companies Championship champion from previous year

- Steve Stricker

18. Leading player to earn a PGA Tour card from the previous year's Race to Dubai ranking

19. Leading points winner from the Korn Ferry Tour during the previous year

- Ben Kohles

20. Remaining positions and alternates filled through current year FedEx Cup standings after the Cognizant Classic (rank in parentheses)

- Charley Hoffman (36)
- Sami Välimäki (38)
- Chan Kim (69)
- Ben Silverman (73)
- Ryo Hisatsune (88)
- Robert MacIntyre (92)
- David Skinns (93)
- Jimmy Stanger (96)

==== Ineligible players ====
The following players met criteria but, having joined LIV Golf, were suspended by the PGA Tour and ineligible to compete:

- Abraham Ancer (11)
- Bryson DeChambeau (7)
- Tyrrell Hatton (2,15)
- Dustin Johnson (4,9)
- Brooks Koepka (1,7,8,15)
- Adrian Meronk (18)
- Phil Mickelson (8)
- Joaquín Niemann (12)
- Jon Rahm (1,4,7,12,15)
- Cameron Smith (5,6,15)

== Round summaries ==
=== First round ===
Thursday, March 14, 2024
Friday, March 15, 2024

The overnight lead was shared by Rory McIlroy, Xander Schauffele and Wyndham Clark, who recorded scores of 65 (7 under par). McIlroy's 10 birdies tied the tournament record for most birdies in a single round. Nick Taylor and Matt Fitzpatrick both shot their career best rounds at the Stadium Course with 6-under 66s. Defending champion and World No. 1 Scottie Scheffler began with a 5-under round of 67, as did debutant Ludvig Åberg.

Ryan Fox became the first player since records began to make back-to-back eagles at The Players Championship; doing so by scoring a three at the par-5 16th and a hole-in-one at the par-3 17th hole.

Play was suspended due to darkness at 7:32 p.m. EDT with 9 players yet to finish their round. Round 1 was completed on Friday morning.

Place	Player	Score	To par
T1	(United States) Wyndham Clark	65	−7
T1	(Northern Ireland) Rory McIlroy	65	−7
T1	(United States) Xander Schauffele	65	−7
T4	(England) Matt Fitzpatrick	66	−6
T4	(Canada) Nick Taylor	66	−6
T6	(Sweden) Ludvig Åberg	67	−5
T6	(Australia) Jason Day	67	−5
T6	(United States) Tyler Duncan	67	−5
T6	(United States) Tom Hoge	67	−5
T6	(United States) Maverick McNealy	67	−5
T6	(United States) Scottie Scheffler	67	−5

=== Second round ===
Friday, March 15, 2024
Saturday, March 16, 2024

Wyndham Clark shot a second consecutive 65 (–7) to reach 14-under for the tournament and open a four-shot lead after 36 holes. Clark, who began the round on the 10th hole, made four straight birdies on holes 1-4 and played his back-nine in six-under.

Xander Schauffele began the round tied for the lead but made a double-bogey on the par-5 11th hole after hitting his second shot in the water. He came back with an eagle on the par-5 16th and shot three-under 67 to join Nick Taylor in a tie for second place at 10-under.

Defending champion Scottie Scheffler chipped in for birdie on the par-3 third hole (his 12th of the round) and shot 69 (–3) to finish at 8-under and in a tie for sixth place. First round co-leader and 2019 champion Rory McIlroy drove into the water on the 14th hole and made double-bogey, part of a one-over round of 73 to fall to 15th place.

The cut came at 143 (–1), after two players who didn't finish their round on Friday finished on Saturday. Notables to miss the cut included 2021 champion Justin Thomas and three-time major champion Jordan Spieth.

Place	Player	Score	To par
1	(United States) Wyndham Clark	65-65=130	−14
T2	(United States) Xander Schauffele	65-69=134	−10
T2	(Canada) Nick Taylor	66-68=134	−10
T4	(England) Matt Fitzpatrick	66-69=135	−9
T4	(United States) Maverick McNealy	67-68=135	−9
T6	(Canada) Corey Conners	68-68=136	−8
T6	(United States) Tom Hoge	67-69=136	−8
T6	(United States) Scottie Scheffler	67-69=136	−8
T6	(Germany) Matti Schmid	68-68=136	−8
T10	(United States) Brian Harman	72-65=137	−7
T10	(Taiwan) Pan Cheng-tsung	69-68=137	−7
T10	(United States) J. T. Poston	69-68=137	−7
T10	(United States) Sahith Theegala	70-67=137	−7

=== Third round ===
Saturday, March 16, 2024

Xander Schauffele made seven birdies in a bogey-free round of 65 to take the 54-hole lead by one shot over Wyndham Clark. Schauffele began the round four shots behind Clark but tied for the lead with a birdie on the 12th. He then made a 58-foot birdie putt on the par-4 14th hole to reach 17-under and in sole possession of the lead going to the final round.

Clark also reached 17-under with a birdie on the par-5 16th hole, but his tee shot on the par-3 17th found the water hazard. He made bogey to fall one behind Schauffele and finished with a two-under round of 70.

Brian Harman made five birdies on the back-nine to shoot the lowest round of the day with a 64 (–8) and climb up to third place at 15-under, two behind Schauffele; with second and third rounds of 65 and 64, respectively, Harman recorded the lowest two-consecutive-round total in Players history, with a 129. Maverick McNealy chipped in for birdie on the 14th to get within three of the lead, but he hit his second shot on the 16th into the water and made bogey. He finished at 13-under and in a tie for fourth place with Matt Fitzpatrick. Defending champion Scottie Scheffler was one-under on his round before finishing with three straight birdies to shoot 68 (–4) and move into sixth place.

Place	Player	Score	To par
1	(United States) Xander Schauffele	65-69-65=199	−17
2	(United States) Wyndham Clark	65-65-70=200	−16
3	(United States) Brian Harman	72-65-64=201	−15
T4	(England) Matt Fitzpatrick	66-69-68=203	−13
T4	(United States) Maverick McNealy	67-68-68=203	−13
T6	(United States) Scottie Scheffler	67-69-68=204	−12
T6	(United States) Sahith Theegala	70-67-67=204	−12
8	(United States) Nate Lashley	68-70-67=205	−11
T9	(Japan) Hideki Matsuyama	69-69-68=206	−10
T9	(United States) Taylor Montgomery	68-70-68=206	−10
T9	(United States) J. T. Poston	69-68-69=206	−10

=== Final round ===
Sunday, March 17, 2024

Defending champion Scottie Scheffler shot a bogey free 64 (−8) to overcome a five shot deficit and become the first player in the history of The Players Championship to win back-to-back tournaments.

Wyndham Clark, Xander Schauffele and Brian Harman all had birdie putts on the 18th hole to force a playoff, but all missed.

Champion
(c) = past champion

Place	Player	Score	To par	Money ($)
1	(United States) Scottie Scheffler (c)	67-69-68-64=268	−20	4,500,000
T2	(United States) Wyndham Clark	65-65-70-69=269	−19	1,891,667
T2	(United States) Brian Harman	72-65-64-68=269	−19	1,891,667
T2	(United States) Xander Schauffele	65-69-65-70=269	−19	1,891,667
5	(England) Matt Fitzpatrick	66-69-68-69=272	−16	1,025,000
T6	(South Korea) Kim Si-woo (c)	70-71-68-64=273	−15	875,000
T6	(Japan) Hideki Matsuyama	69-69-68-67=273	−15	875,000
8	(Sweden) Ludvig Åberg	67-73-67-67=274	−14	781,250
T9	(United States) Maverick McNealy	67-68-68-72=275	−13	706,250
T9	(United States) Sahith Theegala	70-67-67-71=275	−13	706,250

Leaderboard below the top 10
Place	Player	Score	To par	Money ($)
T11	(United States) Joel Dahmen	74-67-67-68=276	−12	606,250
T11	(United States) Taylor Montgomery	68-70-68-70=276	−12	606,250
T13	(South Africa) Christiaan Bezuidenhout	69-70-68-70=277	−11	489,583
T13	(Canada) Corey Conners	68-68-73-68=277	−11	489,583
T13	(United States) Nate Lashley	68-70-67-72=277	−11	489,583
T16	(United States) Doug Ghim	71-70-66-71=278	−10	406,250
T16	(United States) Sam Ryder	70-69-70-69=278	−10	406,250
T16	(Austria) Sepp Straka	68-70-70-70=278	−10	406,250
T19	(United States) Harris English	69-69-75-66=279	−9	285,536
T19	(United States) Kurt Kitayama	70-71-71-67=279	−9	285,536
T19	(Republic of Ireland) Shane Lowry	71-70-72-66=279	−9	285,536
T19	(Northern Ireland) Rory McIlroy (c)	65-73-69-72=279	−9	285,536
T19	(Sweden) Alex Norén	71-70-70-68=279	−9	285,536
T19	(United States) Adam Schenk	71-71-66-71=279	−9	285,536
T19	(United States) Dylan Wu	69-74-69-67=279	−9	285,536
T26	(Canada) Mackenzie Hughes	70-73-69-68=280	−8	186,250
T26	(United States) Chris Kirk	68-70-73-69=280	−8	186,250
T26	(United States) Matthew NeSmith	73-67-68-72=280	−8	186,250
T26	(Germany) Matti Schmid	68-68-72-72=280	−8	186,250
T26	(Canada) Nick Taylor	66-68-76-70=280	−8	186,250
T31	(United States) Mark Hubbard	68-73-72-68=281	−7	152,813
T31	(South Korea) Im Sung-jae	70-72-69-70=281	−7	152,813
T31	(United States) Ben Martin	72-71-71-67=281	−7	152,813
T31	(United States) Taylor Moore	72-68-70-71=281	−7	152,813
T35	(Australia) Jason Day (c)	67-71-72-72=282	−6	119,286
T35	(England) Tommy Fleetwood	70-72-69-71=282	−6	119,286
T35	(United States) Brice Garnett	71-72-67-72=282	−6	119,286
T35	(United States) Lee Hodges	69-70-72-71=282	−6	119,286
T35	(United States) Denny McCarthy	71-71-71-69=282	−6	119,286
T35	(England) Aaron Rai	71-72-68-71=282	−6	119,286
T35	(United States) Jimmy Stanger	69-73-71-69=282	−6	119,286
T42	(United States) David Lipsky	73-70-69-71=283	−5	93,750
T42	(United States) Grayson Murray	73-69-77-64=283	−5	93,750
T42	(Taiwan) Pan Cheng-tsung	69-68-70-76=283	−5	93,750
T45	(United States) Sam Burns	73-70-65-76=284	−4	70,063
T45	(United States) Austin Eckroat	71-69-68-76=284	−4	70,063
T45	(United States) Tony Finau	69-72-69-74=284	−4	70,063
T45	(United States) Jake Knapp	71-72-68-73=284	−4	70,063
T45	(United States) Ryan Moore	70-69-73-72=284	−4	70,063
T45	(United States) Collin Morikawa	71-69-70-74=284	−4	70,063
T45	(United States) J. T. Poston	69-68-69-78=284	−4	70,063
T45	(Australia) Adam Scott	70-72-71-71=284	−4	70,063
53	(United States) Andrew Putnam	69-74-72-70=285	−3	60,250
T54	(United States) Zac Blair	73-70-70-73=286	−2	57,500
T54	(Argentina) Emiliano Grillo	69-71-69-77=286	−2	57,500
T54	(United States) Tom Hoge	67-69-75-75=286	−2	57,500
T54	(Scotland) Martin Laird	70-73-70-73=286	−2	57,500
T54	(Australia) Min Woo Lee	73-70-73-70=286	−2	57,500
T54	(Italy) Francesco Molinari	72-69-73-72=286	−2	57,500
T54	(Finland) Sami Välimäki	71-72-69-74=286	−2	57,500
T54	(United States) Cameron Young	70-69-73-74=286	−2	57,500
T62	(Belgium) Thomas Detry	71-72-74-70=287	−1	55,000
T62	(Norway) Viktor Hovland	73-69-71-74=287	−1	55,000
T64	(United States) Tyler Duncan	67-75-72-74=288	E	53,500
T64	(United States) Max Homa	68-75-74-71=288	E	53,500
T64	(Republic of Ireland) Séamus Power	72-69-78-69=288	E	53,500
T64	(United States) J. J. Spaun	72-71-70-75=288	E	53,500
T68	(United States) Patrick Cantlay	72-70-73-75=290	+2	51,500
T68	(United States) Rickie Fowler (c)	74-69-76-71=290	+2	51,500
T68	(United States) Chan Kim	70-71-70-79=290	+2	51,500
T68	(United States) Peter Malnati	70-73-66-81=290	+2	51,500
72	(United States) Gary Woodland	70-73-74-74=291	+3	50,250
73	(United States) Keith Mitchell	69-71-76-76=292	+4	49,750
CUT	(United States) Akshay Bhatia	72-72=144	E	
CUT	(United States) Lucas Glover	75-69=144	E	
CUT	(United States) Ben Griffin	73-71=144	E	
CUT	(Japan) Ryo Hisatsune	70-74=144	E	
CUT	(Germany) Stephan Jäger	72-72=144	E	
CUT	(United States) Luke List	69-75=144	E	
CUT	(United States) Webb Simpson (c)	73-71=144	E	
CUT	(England) David Skinns	71-73=144	E	
CUT	(United States) Tyson Alexander	71-74=145	+1	
CUT	(United States) Hayden Buckley	71-74=145	+1	
CUT	(New Zealand) Ryan Fox	69-76=145	+1	
CUT	(United States) Billy Horschel	71-74=145	+1	
CUT	(United States) Beau Hossler	71-74=145	+1	
CUT	(South Korea) Kim Seong-hyeon	74-71=145	+1	
CUT	(United States) Patrick Rodgers	72-73=145	+1	
CUT	(South Africa) Erik van Rooyen	71-74=145	+1	
CUT	(United States) Justin Suh	76-69=145	+1	
CUT	(United States) Justin Thomas (c)	71-74=145	+1	
CUT	(United States) Brandon Wu	75-70=145	+1	
CUT	(United States) Eric Cole	72-74=146	+2	
CUT	(Colombia) Nico Echavarría	73-73=146	+2	
CUT	(United States) Chesson Hadley	75-71=146	+2	
CUT	(United States) Russell Henley	73-73=146	+2	
CUT	(United States) Matt Kuchar (c)	74-72=146	+2	
CUT	(United States) Justin Lower	71-75=146	+2	
CUT	(United States) Troy Merritt	73-73=146	+2	
CUT	(United States) Greyson Sigg	75-71=146	+2	
CUT	(Canada) Ben Silverman	72-74=146	+2	
CUT	(United States) Jordan Spieth	74-72=146	+2	
CUT	(United States) Steve Stricker	72-74=146	+2	
CUT	(United States) Davis Thompson	75-71=146	+2	
CUT	(United States) Carson Young	71-75=146	+2	
CUT	(United States) Nick Dunlap	77-70=147	+3	
CUT	(France) Matthieu Pavon	70-77=147	+3	
CUT	(United States) Chez Reavie	74-73=147	+3	
CUT	(England) Justin Rose	70-77=147	+3	
CUT	(United States) Alex Smalley	70-77=147	+3	
CUT	(Canada) Adam Svensson	74-73=147	+3	
CUT	(England) Matt Wallace	73-74=147	+3	
CUT	(Taiwan) Kevin Yu	74-73=147	+3	
CUT	(United States) Joseph Bramlett	77-71=148	+4	
CUT	(Canada) Adam Hadwin	75-73=148	+4	
CUT	(United States) Michael Kim	68-80=148	+4	
CUT	(United States) Andrew Novak	74-74=148	+4	
CUT	(United States) Davis Riley	74-74=148	+4	
CUT	(United States) Will Zalatoris	73-75=148	+4	
CUT	(South Korea) An Byeong-hun	69-80=149	+5	
CUT	(United States) Charley Hoffman	75-74=149	+5	
CUT	(Denmark) Nicolai Højgaard	73-76=149	+5	
CUT	(United States) Chad Ramey	73-76=149	+5	
CUT	(United States) Sam Stevens	73-76=149	+5	
CUT	(Australia) Aaron Baddeley	74-76=150	+6	
CUT	(United States) Keegan Bradley	72-78=150	+6	
CUT	(Scotland) Robert MacIntyre	74-76=150	+6	
CUT	(Sweden) Vincent Norrman	77-73=150	+6	
CUT	(Canada) Taylor Pendrith	75-75=150	+6	
CUT	(United States) Scott Stallings	74-76=150	+6	
CUT	(England) Ben Taylor	73-77=150	+6	
CUT	(United States) Brendon Todd	74-76=150	+6	
CUT	(China) Yuan Yechun	74-76=150	+6	
CUT	(England) Harry Hall	77-74=151	+7	
CUT	(United States) Nick Hardy	74-77=151	+7	
CUT	(South Korea) Lee Kyoung-hoon	75-76=151	+7	
CUT	(United States) Robby Shelton	80-72=152	+8	
CUT	(United States) Kevin Streelman	77-75=152	+8	
CUT	(United States) Ben Kohles	80-73=153	+9	
CUT	(England) Callum Tarren	75-78=153	+9	
CUT	(Colombia) Camilo Villegas	73-82=155	+11	
CUT	(Australia) Cameron Davis	79-82=161	+17	
WD	(South Africa) Garrick Higgo (Note: Higgo withdrew on Friday morning due to a wrist injury; he had completed 4 holes of his second round.)	73-18=91	+3	
WD	(South Korea) Tom Kim (Note: Kim withdrew on Thursday morning due to illness; he had completed 8 holes of his first round.)	–		

==== Scorecard ====
Final round

Hole	1	2	3	4	5	6	7	8	9	10	11	12	13	14	15	16	17	18
Par	4	5	3	4	4	4	4	3	5	4	5	4	3	4	4	5	3	4
(United States) Scheffler	–12	–12	–12	–14	–15	–15	–15	–16	–17	–17	–18	–19	–19	–19	–19	–20	–20	–20
(United States) Clark	–16	–17	–17	–17	–17	–17	–17	–17	–18	–17	–18	–18	–18	–17	–17	–18	–19	–19
(United States) Harman	–15	–15	–15	–15	–15	–14	–15	–16	–17	–17	–18	–18	–18	–18	–19	–19	–19	–19
(United States) Schauffele	–17	–18	–18	–17	–17	–17	–18	–18	–19	–19	–19	–20	–20	–19	–18	–19	–19	–19
(England) Fitzpatrick	–14	–15	–15	–14	–14	–13	–13	–13	–12	–12	–12	–13	–12	–12	–13	–14	–15	–16
(South Korea) Kim	–7	–8	–8	–8	–8	–9	–10	–9	–10	–10	–11	–11	–11	–12	–13	–15	–15	–15
(Japan) Matsuyama	–10	–11	–12	–12	–12	–12	–12	–13	–13	–13	–14	–14	–14	–15	–15	–15	–15	–15
(Sweden) Åberg	–9	–10	–11	–11	–11	–11	–11	–11	–11	–11	–13	–14	–14	–14	–14	–14	–14	–14
(United States) McNealy	–13	–13	–13	–13	–13	–13	–13	–13	–13	–13	–13	–14	–14	–14	–13	–13	–13	–13
(United States) Theegala	–13	–13	–13	–13	–13	–14	–14	–14	–13	–13	–13	–14	–14	–13	–13	–13	–13	–13

Cumulative tournament scores, relative to par

Eagle	Birdie	Bogey
