= 2023 U.S. Open field =

This page lists the criteria used to determine the field for the 2023 U.S. Open and the players who qualified.

The field for the U.S. Open is made up of players who gain entry through qualifying events and those who are exempt from qualifying. The exemption criteria include provisions for recent major champions, winners of major amateur events, and leading players in the world rankings. Qualifying is in two stages, local and final, with some players being exempted through to final qualifying.

== Exemptions ==
This list details the exemption criteria for the 2023 U.S. Open and the players who qualified under them; any additional criteria under which players were exempt is indicated in parentheses. (Note: (a) – denotes amateur.)

1. Recent winners of the U.S. Open (2013–2022)

- Bryson DeChambeau
- Matt Fitzpatrick (2,11,22)
- Dustin Johnson (6)
- Martin Kaymer
- Brooks Koepka (7,22)
- Jon Rahm (6,11,12,22)
- Justin Rose (22)
- Jordan Spieth (11,22)
- Gary Woodland (2)

2. The leading ten players, and those tying for tenth place, in the 2022 U.S. Open

- Keegan Bradley (22)
- Joel Dahmen
- Adam Hadwin
- Hideki Matsuyama (6,11,22)
- Denny McCarthy (22)
- Rory McIlroy (11,12,22)
- Collin Morikawa (7,8,11,22)
- Scottie Scheffler (6,9,11,22)
- Will Zalatoris (11,22) did not play.

3. The winner of the 2022 U.S. Senior Open

- Pádraig Harrington

4. The winner of the 2022 U.S. Amateur

- Sam Bennett

5. Winners of the 2022 U.S. Junior Amateur and U.S. Mid-Amateur, and the runner-up in the 2022 U.S. Amateur (Note: Players qualifying in this categories must remain an amateur through the conclusion of the U.S. Open.)

- Ben Carr (a)
- Ding Wenyi (a)
- Matthew McClean (a)

6. Recent winners of the Masters Tournament (2019–2023)

- Tiger Woods did not play.

7. Recent winners of the PGA Championship (2018–2023)

- Phil Mickelson
- Justin Thomas (9,11,22)

8. Recent winners of The Open Championship (2018–2022)

- Shane Lowry (10,22)
- Francesco Molinari
- Cameron Smith (9,11,22)

9. Recent winners of The Players Championship (2021–2023)

10. The winner of the 2022 BMW PGA Championship

11. All players who qualified and were eligible for the 2022 Tour Championship

- Sam Burns (22)
- Patrick Cantlay (22)
- Corey Conners (22)
- Tony Finau (12,22)
- Brian Harman (22)
- Tom Hoge (22)
- Max Homa (12,22)
- Billy Horschel (22)
- Viktor Hovland (22)
- Im Sung-jae (22)
- Lee Kyoung-hoon (22)
- Joaquín Niemann (22)
- J. T. Poston (22)
- Xander Schauffele (12,22)
- Adam Scott (22)
- Scott Stallings
- Sepp Straka (22)
- Sahith Theegala (22)
- Aaron Wise (22)
- Cameron Young (22)

12. Winners of multiple PGA Tour events (Note: Events must carry full-point allocation towards the FedEx Cup.) from the 2022 U.S. Open to the start of the 2023 tournament

- Tom Kim (22)

13. The top 5 players in the FedEx Cup standings as of May 22 who are not yet exempt

- Hayden Buckley
- Mackenzie Hughes
- Taylor Montgomery
- Andrew Putnam
- Nick Taylor

14. The top player on the 2022 Korn Ferry Tour full-season points list

- Justin Suh

15. The top 2 players on the 2022 DP World Tour Rankings who are not yet exempt as of May 22

- Thriston Lawrence
- Jordan Smith

16. The top player on the 2023 Race to Dubai as of May 22 who is not yet exempt

- Min Woo Lee

17. The top 2 point earners from the European Tour "U.S. Open Qualifying Series" (Note: The U.S. Open Qualifying Series consists of four tournaments: DS Automobiles Italian Open, Soudal Open, KLM Open and Porsche European Open.) who are not otherwise exempt

- Simon Forsström
- Romain Langasque

18. The winner of the 2022 Amateur Championship

- Aldrich Potgieter (a)

19. The winner of the Mark H. McCormack Medal in 2022

- Keita Nakajima forfeited his exemption by turning professional.

20. The individual winner of the 2023 NCAA Division I Men's Golf Championship

- Fred Biondi forfeited his exemption by turning professional.

21. The winner of the 2023 Latin America Amateur Championship

- Mateo Fernández de Oliveira (a)

22. The leading 60 players on the Official World Golf Ranking as of May 22

- Abraham Ancer
- Wyndham Clark
- Cameron Davis
- Jason Day
- Harris English
- Tommy Fleetwood
- Rickie Fowler
- Ryan Fox
- Tyrrell Hatton
- Russell Henley
- Lucas Herbert
- Kim Si-woo
- Chris Kirk
- Kurt Kitayama
- Matt Kuchar
- Adrian Meronk
- Keith Mitchell
- Taylor Moore
- Alex Norén
- Mito Pereira
- Victor Perez
- Thomas Pieters
- Séamus Power
- Patrick Reed
- Adam Svensson

23. The leading 60 players on the Official World Golf Ranking if not otherwise exempt as of June 12

- Emiliano Grillo
- Pablo Larrazábal
- Adam Schenk

24. Special exemptions

- None

== Qualifiers ==
There were a record 10,187 entries received. There were 109 local qualifying events from which the leading players progressed to the 13 final qualifying events, nine of which were held in the United States on June 5.

| Date | Location | Venue | Field | Spots | Qualifiers (Note: (L) – denotes a player who progressed through local qualifying.) |
|---|---|---|---|---|---|
| May 16 | Surrey, England | Walton Heath Golf Club | 77 | 7 | Jens Dantorp, Alejandro del Rey, Ross Fisher, Deon Germishuys, David Horsey, Wilco Nienaber, Matthieu Pavon |
| May 22 | Tsukubamirai, Japan | Ibaraki Golf Club | 29 | 3 | Gunn Charoenkul, Ryo Ishikawa, Ryutaro Nagano |
| May 22 | Dallas, Texas | Northwood Club and Bent Tree Country Club | 120 | 8 | Austin Eckroat, Sergio García, Brent Grant, Paul Haley II, Hank Lebioda, Roger Sloan, Jacob Solomon (L), Carson Young |
| Jun 5 | Toronto, Ontario, Canada | Lambton Golf and Country Club | 27 | 3 | Ryan Armour, Ryan Gerard, Vincent Norrman |
| Jun 5 | Los Angeles, California | Hillcrest Country Club | 89 | 5 | Barclay Brown (a), Charley Hoffman, Omar Morales (a,L), David Puig (L), Preston Summerhays (a) |
| Jun 5 | Boynton Beach, Florida | Pine Tree Golf Club | 51 | 3 | Carlos Ortiz, Austen Truslow (L), Brendan Valdes (a,L) |
| Jun 5 | Ball Ground, Georgia | Hawks Ridge Golf Club | 43 | 3 | J. J. Grey (L), Kyle Mueller (L), Gordon Sargent (a) |
| Jun 5 | Rockville, Maryland | Woodmont Country Club | 60 | 4 | Michael Brennan (a), Sebastián Muñoz, Isaac Simmons (a,L), Karl Vilips (a) |
| Jun 5 | Summit, New Jersey | Canoe Brook Country Club (North and South courses) | 67 | 4 | Christian Cavaliere (a,L), Berry Henson, Andrew Svoboda (L), Michael Thorbjornsen (a) |
| Jun 5 | Durham, North Carolina | Old Chatham Golf Club | 76 | 5 | Paul Barjon, Frankie Capan III (L), Patrick Cover (L), Yuto Katsuragawa, Mac Meissner |
| Jun 5 | Columbus, Ohio | Lakes Golf and Country Club and Brookside Golf and Country Club | 103 | 11 | Olin Browne Jr. (L), Stewart Cink, Eric Cole, Nick Dunlap (a), Nico Echavarría, Luke List, David Nyfjäll (L), Corey Pereira (L), Patrick Rodgers, Kevin Streelman, Davis Thompson |
| Jun 5 | Springfield, Ohio | Springfield Country Club | 75 | 5 | Nick Hardy, Taylor Pendrith, Alex Schaake (L), Sam Stevens, Dylan Wu |
| Jun 5 | Tacoma, Washington | Tacoma Country and Golf Club | 54 | 2 | Jesse Schutte (L), Alex Yang (a,L) |

=== Alternates who gained entry ===
The following players gained a place in the field having finished as the leading alternates in the specified final qualifying events:

- Jordan Gumberg (L, England) (Note: Added to field the week prior to the tournament, possibly to replace Fred Biondi.)
- Bastien Amat (a, L, Washington) (Note: Claimed spot held for category 23.)
- Michael Kim (Texas)
- Maxwell Moldovan (a, Springfield)
