= Chile Classic =

Golf tournament in Santiago, Chile

Astara Chile Classic
Tournament information
- Location: La Reina, Chile
- Established: 2012
- Course: Prince of Wales Country Club
- Par: 71
- Length: 6,903 yards (6,312 m)
- Tour: Korn Ferry Tour
- Format: Stroke play
- Prize fund: US$1,000,000
- Month played: March

Tournament record score
- Aggregate: 263 Dawie van der Walt (2015)
- To par: −22 Paul Haley II (2012)

Current champion
- (United States) Doc Redman

Final champion
- Location in Chile

The Chile Classic is a golf tournament on the Korn Ferry Tour. It is played annually in Santiago, Chile. From 2012 to 2014, it was played at the Prince of Wales Country Club. In 2015, it moved to the Club de Golf Mapocho. It was one of several tournaments on the Nationwide Tour held outside the United States. The 2015 purse was $600,000, with $108,000 going to the winner.

== Winners ==
Year	Winner	Score	To par	Margin of victory	Runner(s)-up
Astara Chile Classic
2026	(United States) Doc Redman	265	−19	5 strokes	(United States) Cooper Dossey (United States) Michael Johnson
2025	(United States) Logan McAllister	265	−19	1 stroke	(United States) Davis Chatfield
2024	(United States) Taylor Dickson	271	−17	Playoff	(United States) Trey Winstead
2023	(United States) Ben Kohles	267	−21	Playoff	(Australia) Dimitrios Papadatos
Chile Classic
2016–2022: No tournament
2015	(South Africa) Dawie van der Walt	263	−21	2 strokes	(United States) Erik Barnes
2014	(Canada) Adam Hadwin	272	−16	1 stroke	(Australia) Alistair Presnell
2013	(United States) Kevin Kisner	267	−21	1 stroke	(United States) Brice Garnett (United States) Edward Loar
2012	(United States) Paul Haley II	266	−22	3 strokes	(United States) Joseph Bramlett
