= 2022 Korn Ferry Tour Finals graduates =

This is a list of golfers who graduated from the Korn Ferry Tour and Korn Ferry Tour Finals in 2022. The top 25 players on the 2022 Korn Ferry Tour regular-season points list earned PGA Tour cards for 2022–23. The Finals determined the other 25 players to earn PGA Tour cards and the initial priority order of all 50.

As in previous seasons, the Finals featured the top 75 players on the Korn Ferry Tour regular-season points list, players ranked 126–200 on the PGA Tour's regular-season FedEx Cup points list (except players exempt through other means), non-members of the PGA Tour with enough regular-season FedEx Cup points to place 126–200, and special medical exemptions. Players who had resigned or been suspended due to participation in LIV Golf were removed from the FedEx Cup and Korn Ferry Tour points lists before the Finals. On September 2, six players who were competing in LIV Golf Invitational Boston were retroactively removed from the FedEx Cup points list, elevating several players who competed in the Finals into the top 125 and fully-exempt PGA Tour status; these players were removed from the Finals points list.

To determine the initial 2022–23 PGA Tour priority rank, the 25 Korn Ferry Tour regular-season graduates will be alternated with the 25 Finals graduates. This priority order will then be reshuffled several times during the 2022–23 season based on the FedEx Cup standings. Justin Suh is fully exempt for the 2022–23 PGA Tour season after leading both the full-season and Finals points lists.

Player	2022 Korn Ferry Tour regular season		2022 FedEx Cup	2022 Korn Ferry Tour Finals			The 25 Regular + Finals		Priority rank
Player	Rank	Points	2022 FedEx Cup	Rank	Without The 25	Points	Rank	Points	Priority rank
(United States) Justin Suh^{†}	7	1145		1		1167	1	2312	Exempt
(China) Yuan Yechun*	1	1819		17		280	2	2099	1
(United States) Will Gordon	33	699		2	1	1073			2
(United States) Paul Haley II	3	1341		4		615	3	1956	3
(Sweden) David Lingmerth	179	42	187	3	2	1000			4
(China) Dou Zecheng	4	1321		10		391	4	1712	5
(United States) Austin Eckroat*	34	678		5	3	615			6
(United States) Robby Shelton	2	1603		46		109	5	1712	7
(United States) Philip Knowles*	67	340		6	4	584			8
(South Africa) M. J. Daffue^{†}	11	1090		7		501	6	1591	9
(Canada) Michael Gligic			129	8	5	458			10
(United States) Taylor Montgomery*	5	1216		13		340	7	1556	11
(South Africa) Dean Burmester*				9	6	398			12
(England) Ben Taylor	9	1095		19		273	8	1367	13
(United States) Eric Cole*	39	637		11	7	369			14
(South Korea) Kim Seong-hyeon*	12	981		15		309	9	1290	15
(United States) Joseph Bramlett			156	12	8	342			16
(England) Harry Hall*	17	876		14		334	10	1209	17
(United States) Austin Cook			143	16	9	288			18
(United States) Brandon Matthews*	10	1094		53		92	11	1186	19
(United States) Nick Hardy	80	300	126	18	10	277			20
(Argentina) Augusto Núñez*	6	1157		102		11	12	1168	21
(Sweden) Henrik Norlander			138	20	11	265			22
(South Korea) An Byeong-hun	13	941		32		185	13	1126	23
(United States) Ben Martin	160	82	145	21	12	255			24
(United States) Erik Barnes*	15	908		T26		200	14	1108	25
(United States) Ryan Armour			149	22	13	253			26
(United States) Ben Griffin*	8	1102		n/a		0	15	1102	27
(United States) Nicholas Lindheim	64	361		23	14	220			28
(United States) Davis Thompson*	14	926		39		135	16	1061	29
(United States) Brent Grant*	29	748		24	15	218			30
(United States) Michael Kim	19	857	182	31		188	17	1045	31
(United States) Carson Young*	31	722		25	16	200			32
(United States) Tyson Alexander*	18	857		66		64	18	922	33
(United States) Scott Harrington	70	335		T26	T17	200			34
(Australia) Harrison Endycott*	21	830		T55		84	19	914	35
(Belgium) Thomas Detry*				T26	T17	200			36
(United States) Trevor Werbylo*	16	878		102		16	20	894	37
(Argentina) Estanislao Goya*	57	373		29	19	199			38
(United States) Kevin Roy*	24	784		47		109	25	893	39
(Colombia) Nico Echavarría*	41	615		30	20	190			40
(United States) Anders Albertson	25	783		T55		84	21	867	41
(United States) Sam Stevens*	43	602		33	21	171			42
(Taiwan) Kevin Yu*	20	846		101		17	22	863	43
(Germany) Matti Schmid*				34	22	167			44
(Sweden) Vincent Norrman*	23	785		T69		61	23	846	45
(United States) Brice Garnett			141	35	23	164			46
(United States) Trevor Cone*	22	825		T109		10	24	835	47
(United States) Brian Stuard			128	36	24	161			48
(United States) Kyle Westmoreland*	60	364		37	25	154			49

*PGA Tour rookie in 2022–23
^{†}First-time PGA Tour member in 2022–23, but ineligible for rookie status due to having played eight or more PGA Tour events as a professional in a previous season

- Earned spot in Finals through PGA Tour.
- Earned spot in Finals through FedEx Cup points earned as a PGA Tour non-member.
- Indicates whether the player earned his card through the regular season or through the Finals.

FedEx Cup rankings reflect the removal of LIV Golf Invitational Boston competitors.

== Results on the PGA Tour in 2022–23 ==
Player	Starts	Cuts made	Best finish	Money list rank	Earnings ($)	FedEx Cup rank
(United States) Justin Suh^{†}	35	28	4	3	3,075,821	72
(China) Yuan Yechun*	30	14	T6	100	1,167,050	125
(United States) Will Gordon	35	21	T3	113	1,449,632	98
(United States) Paul Haley II	35	13	5	151	755,188	150
(Sweden) David Lingmerth	32	13	T3	84	2,227,332	94
(China) Dou Zecheng	33	18	T5	135	1,099,906	132
(United States) Austin Eckroat*	32	17	T2	75	2,476,429	80
(United States) Robby Shelton	33	17	T4	101	1,743,610	87
(United States) Philip Knowles*	9	3	T48	230	53,421	224
(South Africa) M. J. Daffue^{†}	32	8	T15	147	830,919	136
(Canada) Michael Gligic	32	20	T13	212	169,449	205
(United States) Taylor Montgomery*	32	22	3	57	3,079,378	54
(South Africa) Dean Burmester*	9	8	4	n/a	612,165	n/a
(England) Ben Taylor	35	18	3	91	1,912,677	85
(United States) Eric Cole*	37	27	2/T2 (x2)	31	5,457,030	43
(South Korea) Kim Seong-hyeon*	36	21	2	78	2,464,522	68
(United States) Joseph Bramlett	26	16	T7	107	1,597,911	109
(England) Harry Hall*	34	19	T3	108	1,564,358	93
(United States) Austin Cook	33	12	T10	159	647,085	149
(United States) Brandon Matthews*	28	5	T7	202	265,711	196
(United States) Nick Hardy	37	25	Win	69	2,845,184	56
(Argentina) Augusto Núñez*	32	13	T15	187	382,748	180
(Sweden) Henrik Norlander	32	15	T2	132	1,158,809	126
(South Korea) An Byeong-hun	31	24	T2	54	3,231,760	44
(United States) Ben Martin	34	18	T5	118	1,397,841	116
(United States) Erik Barnes*	15	5	T10	184	422,239	181
(United States) Ryan Armour	33	14	T13	168	539,788	166
(United States) Ben Griffin*	37	25	T2	66	2,897,799	53
(United States) Nicholas Lindheim	6	4	T27	208	187,577	201
(United States) Davis Thompson*	30	21	2	87	2,191,482	76
(United States) Brent Grant*	33	12	T8	178	466,212	168
(United States) Michael Kim	32	17	5/T5 (x2)	86	2,206,882	84
(United States) Carson Young*	35	17	T3	103	1,707,716	101
(United States) Tyson Alexander*	35	14	2	115	1,443,633	102
(United States) Scott Harrington	31	10	T26	197	300,546	183
(Australia) Harrison Endycott*	33	13	10	146	840,303	139
(Belgium) Thomas Detry*	29	22	2	73	2,481,116	63
(United States) Trevor Werbylo*	31	14	T27	195	309,436	191
(Argentina) Estanislao Goya*	30	18	T10	163	595,760	155
(United States) Kevin Roy*	31	9	T8	176	478,670	161
(Colombia) Nico Echavarría*	31	8	Win	137	1,035,131	119
(United States) Anders Albertson	9	4	T21	221	87,639	217
(United States) Sam Stevens*	35	21	2	85	2,208,792	75
(Taiwan) Kevin Yu*	23	12	T3	127	1,232,379	111
(Germany) Matti Schmid*	30	11	T6	136	1,064,025	121
(Sweden) Vincent Norrman	29	16	Win	105	1,628,429	81
(United States) Brice Garnett	28	16	T8	174	492,959	163
(United States) Trevor Cone*	30	13	T3	173	494,936	174
(United States) Brian Stuard	29	9	T12	199	296,420	193
(United States) Kyle Westmoreland*	32	10	T27	196	308,365	192

- Retained his PGA Tour card for 2024: won or finished in the top 125 of the final FedEx Cup points list through the 2023 Fed Ex Cup Fall Season.
- Retained PGA Tour conditional status for 2024: finished between 126 and 150 on the final FedEx Cup list through the 2023 Fed Ex Cup Fall Season.
- Failed to retain his PGA Tour card for 2024: finished lower than 150 on the final FedEx Cup list through the 2023 Fed Ex Cup Fall Season.
- Withdrew from the PGA Tour in February 2023 to join LIV GOLF.

Harrison Endycott regained his card following the season through the 2023 PGA Tour Qualifying School.

== Wins on the PGA Tour in 2022–23 ==
No.	Date	Player	Tournament	Winning score	Margin of victory	Runner(s)-up	Payout ($)
1	Mar 5, 2023	(Colombia) Nico Echavarría	Puerto Rico Open	−21 (67-67-65-68=267)	2 strokes	(United States) Akshay Bhatia	684,000
2	Apr 23, 2023	(United States) Nick Hardy (with (United States) Davis Riley)	Zurich Classic of New Orleans	−30 (64-66-63-65=258)	2 strokes	(Canada) Adam Hadwin (Canada) Nick Taylor	1,242,700
3	July 16, 2023	(Sweden) Vincent Norrman	Barbasol Championship	−22 (66-67-67-66=266)	Playoff	(England) Nathan Kimsey	684,000

== Runner-up finishes on the PGA Tour in 2022–23 ==
No.	Date	Player	Tournament	Winner	Winning score	Runner-up score	Payout ($)
1	Oct 30, 2022	(Belgium) Thomas Detry	Butterfield Bermuda Championship	(Republic of Ireland) Séamus Power	−19 (65-65-65-70=265)	−18 (64-67-68-67=266)	708,500
2	Nov 13, 2022	(United States) Tyson Alexander	Cadence Bank Houston Open	(United States) Tony Finau	−16 (65-62-68-69=264)	−12 (66-66-70-66=268)	915,600
3	Jan 22, 2023	(United States) Davis Thompson	The American Express	(Spain) Jon Rahm	−27 (64-64-65-68=261)	−26 (62-64-67-69=262)	872,000
4	Feb 26, 2023	(United States) Eric Cole	The Honda Classic	(United States) Chris Kirk	−14 (69-62-66-69=266)	−14 (67-66-66-67=266)	915,600
5	Apr 2, 2023	(United States) Sam Stevens	Valero Texas Open	(Canada) Corey Conners	−15 (64-72-69-68=273)	−14 (72-68-68-66=274)	970,100
6	May 14, 2023	(United States) Austin Eckroat	AT&T Byron Nelson	(Australia) Jason Day	−23 (64-69-66-62=261)	−22 (69-65-63-65=262)	845,500
7	Aug 6, 2023	(South Korea) An Byeong-hun	Wyndham Championship	(United States) Lucas Glover	−20 (66-64-62-68=260)	−18 (63-67-65-67=262)	676,400
8	Sep 17, 2023	(South Korea) Kim Seong-hyeon	Fortinet Championship	(United States) Sahith Theegala	−21 (68-64-67-68=267)	−19 (65-67-69-68=269)	915,600
9	Oct 8, 2023	(United States) Ben Griffin	Sanderson Farms Championship	(United States) Luke List	−18 (66-66-68-70=270)	−18 (67-63-66-74=270)	549,400
10	Oct 8, 2023	(Sweden) Henrik Norlander	Sanderson Farms Championship	(United States) Luke List	−18 (66-66-68-70=270)	−18 (65-67-68-70=270)	549,400
