= The Bahamas Great Exuma Classic =

Golf tournament

The Bahamas Golf Classic

Tournament information
- Location: Great Exuma, The Bahamas
- Established: 2017
- Course: The Ocean Course at Atlantis
- Par: 70
- Length: 7,118 yards (6,509 m)
- Tour: Korn Ferry Tour
- Format: Stroke play
- Prize fund: US$1,000,000
- Month played: January

Tournament record score
- Aggregate: 261 Taylor Dickson (2026)
- To par: −27 as above

Current champion
- (United States) Taylor Dickson

Final champion
- Location in the Bahamas

The Bahamas Great Exuma Classic is a golf tournament on the Korn Ferry Tour, currently played on The Ocean Course at Atlantis on Atlantis Paradise Island in the Bahamas.

== History ==
It is one of two Korn Ferry Tour events in the Bahamas, along with The Bahamas Great Abaco Classic. Both events were first played in January 2017 starting on a Sunday and finishing on a Wednesday, rather than the standard Thursday–Sunday schedule.

Due to high winds in the inaugural event, the cut line fell at 11-over-par 155, the highest in Web.com Tour history. The par-4 12th hole played to a stroke average of 5.008, making it the hardest in tour history relative to par.

== Winners ==
Year	Winner	Score	To par	Margin of victory	Runner(s)-up
The Bahamas Golf Classic
2026	(United States) Taylor Dickson	261	−27	3 strokes	(Canada) Roger Sloan
2025	(United States) Hank Lebioda	262	−18	Playoff	(South Korea) Kim Seong-hyeon
The Bahamas Great Exuma Classic
2024	(Germany) Jeremy Paul	271	−17	1 stroke	(United States) Kevin Roy
2023	(United States) Chandler Phillips	274	−14	2 strokes	(United States) Cody Blick (United States) Peter Knade
2022	(United States) Akshay Bhatia	274	−14	2 strokes	(United States) Paul Haley II
2021: No tournament
2020	(United States) Tommy Gainey	277	−11	4 strokes	(United States) John Oda (United States) Dylan Wu
2019	(China) Dou Zecheng	270	−18	2 strokes	(United States) Ben Kohles (United States) Steve LeBrun
2018	(South Korea) Im Sung-jae	275	−13	4 strokes	(Mexico) Carlos Ortiz
2017	(United States) Kyle Thompson	286	−2	2 strokes	(United States) Nicholas Thompson (United States) Andrew Yun
