= Kyle Westmoreland =

American professional golfer (born 1991)

Personal information
- Nationality: United States
- Born: September 20, 1991 (age 35) Lewisville, Texas, U.S.
- Height: 6 ft 3 in (191 cm)
- Weight: 220 lb (100 kg)
- Spouse: Erin

Career
- Sport: Golf
- College: United States Air Force Academy
- Status: Professional
- Current tour: Korn Ferry Tour
- Former tours: PGA Tour; PGA Tour Canada
- Professional wins: 1

Number of wins by tour
- Korn Ferry Tour: 1

Best results in major championships
- Masters Tournament: DNP
- PGA Championship: DNP
- U.S. Open: T68: 2021
- The Open Championship: DNP

Kyle Westmoreland (born September 20, 1991) is an American professional golfer.

== College career ==
Westmoreland competed for the United States Air Force Academy where he was named male athlete of the year in 2014 after finishing 4th at the Mountain West Conference championships.

== Professional career ==
Westmoreland made the cut at the 2021 U.S. Open and finished in a tie for 68th place, becoming the first Air Force Academy graduate to do so. He was medalist at local qualifying during the qualification process.

He has also had status on PGA Tour Canada.

In 2022, Westmoreland played on the Korn Ferry Tour with a best finish of T-7th place at AdventHealth Championship.

He earned his PGA Tour card for the 2022–23 season via the 2022 Korn Ferry Tour Finals.

== Amateur wins ==
- 2011 Service Academy Classic
- 2013 Jackrabbit Invitational, Gene Miranda Falcon Invite, Patriot All-America

== Professional wins (1) ==
=== Korn Ferry Tour wins (1) ===
No.	Date	Tournament	Winning score	Margin of victory	Runners-up
1	Feb 9, 2025	Astara Golf Championship	−19 (70-64-61-70=265)	1 stroke	(United States) Pierceson Coody, (South Africa) Christo Lamprecht

== See also ==
- 2022 Korn Ferry Tour Finals graduates
