= Dou Zecheng =

Chinese golfer (born 1997)

Personal information
- Nickname: Marty
- Nationality: China
- Born: 22 January 1997 (age 29) Henan, China
- Height: 5 ft 9 in (175 cm)
- Weight: 154 lb (70 kg)

Career
- Sport: Golf
- Turned professional: 2014
- Current tour: PGA Tour
- Former tours: Korn Ferry Tour; PGA Tour China
- Professional wins: 9

Number of wins by tour
- Korn Ferry Tour: 3
- Other: 6

Achievements and awards
- PGA Tour China Order of Merit winner: 2016

Dou Zecheng (simplified Chinese: 窦泽成; traditional Chinese: 竇澤成; pinyin: Dòu Zéchéng, born 22 January 1997) is a Chinese professional golfer. He is from Henan Province.

As an amateur, Dou represented China at the Summer Youth Olympics, Asian Games, and Eisenhower Trophy in 2014. He won several amateur events and two professional events in China before turning professional in 2014.

Dou won four times on the PGA Tour China in 2016 and won the Order of Merit. He began playing on the Web.com Tour in 2017 and won the Digital Ally Open in July, the first Chinese player to win on the Web.com Tour. He was one of the first Chinese players to earn a PGA Tour card, along with Zhang Xinjun.

In the United States, Dou uses the name Marty.

== Amateur wins ==
- 2010 National Amateur (China)
- 2011 Callaway Junior World Championship (ages 13–14)
- 2012 China National Amateur Winners, Aaron Baddeley International Junior
- 2013 China Amateur Champions, Volvo China Juniors Match Play Championship
- 2014 National Team Asia Games and WATC Selecting Event Leg 1

== Professional wins (9) ==
=== Korn Ferry Tour wins (3) ===
No.	Date	Tournament	Winning score	Margin of victory	Runner(s)-up
1	30 Jul 2017	Digital Ally Open	−25 (65-67-61-66=259)	3 strokes	(United States) Luke Guthrie, (United States) Billy Kennerly, (United States) Kyle Thompson
2	16 Jan 2019	The Bahamas Great Exuma Classic	−18 (67-66-67-70=270)	2 strokes	(United States) Ben Kohles, (United States) Steve LeBrun
3	3 Jul 2022	The Ascendant	−17 (69-67-68-67=271)	1 stroke	(China) Yuan Yechun

Korn Ferry Tour playoff record (0–1)

No.	Year	Tournament	Opponent	Result
1	2022	The Bahamas Great Abaco Classic	(United States) Brandon Harkins	Lost to par on second extra hole

=== PGA Tour China wins (4) ===
No.	Date	Tournament	Winning score	Margin of victory	Runner-up
1	15 May 2016	St. Andrews Henan Open	−2 (73-68-67-78=286)	Playoff	(China) Zhang Xinjun
2	29 May 2016	United Investment Real Estate Wuhan Open	−10 (74-68-65-71=278)	5 strokes	(China) Chen Zihao
3	26 Jun 2016	Sunning Estate Nanjing Zhongshan Open	−14 (70-68-69-67=274)	1 stroke	(Thailand) Gunn Charoenkul
4	4 Sep 2016	Yulongwan Yunnan Open	−23 (65-66-63-67=261)	3 strokes	(United States) Charlie Saxon

=== Other wins (2) ===
- 2012 China National Team Championship (as an amateur)
- 2013 China Unicom Woo Pro-AM Championship (as an amateur)

== Results in World Golf Championships ==
Results not in chronological order before 2015.

Tournament	2014	2015	2016	2017	2018	2019
Championship						
Match Play						
Invitational						
Champions	T68	T51	T40	T69		T67

Did not play

"T" = Tied

== Team appearances ==
Amateur

- Bonallack Trophy (representing Asia/Pacific): 2014
- Eisenhower Trophy (representing China): 2014

== See also ==
- 2017 Web.com Tour Finals graduates
- 2022 Korn Ferry Tour Finals graduates
- 2025 Korn Ferry Tour graduates
