= 2017 Web.com Tour =

Golf tour season

2017 Web.com Tour season
- Duration: January 8, 2017 – October 1, 2017
- Number of official events: 26
- Most wins: (United States) Brice Garnett (2) (United States) Chesson Hadley (2) (Germany) Stephan Jäger (2)
- Regular season money list: (United States) Brice Garnett
- Finals money list: (United States) Chesson Hadley
- Player of the Year: (United States) Chesson Hadley

The 2017 Web.com Tour was the 28th season of the Web.com Tour, the official development tour to the PGA Tour.

== Schedule ==
The following table lists official events during the 2017 season.

Date	Tournament	Location	Purse (US$)	Winner (Note: The number in parentheses after each winner's name is the number of Web.com Tour events they had won up to and including that tournament. This information is only shown for Web.com Tour members. It is rare for someone to accumulate many wins on the Web.com Tour as success at this level usually leads to promotion to the PGA Tour.)	OWGR points	Notes
Jan 11	The Bahamas Great Exuma Classic	Bahamas	600,000	(United States) Kyle Thompson (5)	14	New tournament
Jan 25	The Bahamas Great Abaco Classic	Bahamas	600,000	(United States) Andrew Landry (2)	14	New tournament
Feb 12	Club Colombia Championship	Colombia	700,000	(United States) Ethan Tracy (1)	14	
Feb 19	Panama Claro Championship	Panama	625,000	(United States) Andrew Putnam (2)	14	
Mar 26	Chitimacha Louisiana Open	Louisiana	550,000	(United States) Casey Wittenberg (3)	14	
Apr 23	United Leasing & Finance Championship	Indiana	600,000	(South Korea) Lee Dong-hwan (1)	14	
Apr 30	El Bosque Mexico Championship	Mexico	650,000	(United States) Matt Atkins (1)	14	
May 7	Corales Puntacana Resort and Club Championship	Dominican Republic	625,000	(United States) Nate Lashley (1)	14	
May 21	BMW Charity Pro-Am	South Carolina	700,000	(Germany) Stephan Jäger (2)	14	Pro-Am
Jun 4	Rex Hospital Open	North Carolina	650,000	(United States) Conrad Shindler (1)	14	
Jun 11	Rust-Oleum Championship	Illinois	600,000	(Germany) Stephan Jäger (3)	14	
Jun 18	Air Capital Classic	Kansas	625,000	(United States) Aaron Wise (1)	14	
Jun 25	Lincoln Land Charity Championship	Illinois	550,000	(United States) Adam Schenk (1)	14	
Jul 2	Nashville Golf Open	Tennessee	550,000	(United States) Lanto Griffin (1)	14	
Jul 9	LECOM Health Challenge	New York	600,000	(United States) Chesson Hadley (3)	14	
Jul 16	Utah Championship	Utah	700,000	(United States) Brice Garnett (1)	14	
Jul 23	Pinnacle Bank Championship	Nebraska	600,000	(United States) Sam Ryder (1)	14	New tournament
Jul 30	Digital Ally Open	Kansas	650,000	(China) Dou Zecheng (1)	14	
Aug 6	Ellie Mae Classic	California	600,000	(United States) Martin Piller (6)	14	
Aug 13	Price Cutter Charity Championship	Missouri	675,000	(Canada) Ben Silverman (1)	14	
Aug 20	News Sentinel Open	Tennessee	550,000	(United States) Talor Gooch (1)	14	
Aug 27	WinCo Foods Portland Open	Oregon	800,000	(United States) Brice Garnett (2)	14	
Sep 3	Nationwide Children's Hospital Championship	Ohio	1,000,000	(United States) Peter Uihlein (1)	16	Finals event
Sep 17	Albertsons Boise Open	Idaho	1,000,000	(United States) Chesson Hadley (4)	16	Finals event
Sep 24	DAP Championship	Ohio	1,000,000	(United States) Nicholas Lindheim (2)	16	Finals event
Oct 1	Web.com Tour Championship	Florida	1,000,000	(United States) Jonathan Byrd (2)	20	Finals event

== Location of tournaments ==
Location of tournaments of the 2017 Web.com Tour in the United States and the Bahamas.
Regular-season events
Regular-season finale
Finals events
Location of tournaments of the 2017 Web.com Tour outside the United States and the Bahamas.

== Money list ==
=== Regular season money list ===
The regular season money list was based on prize money won during the season, calculated in U.S. dollars. The top 25 players on the regular season money list earned status to play on the 2017–18 PGA Tour.

Position	Player	Prize money ($)
1	(United States) Brice Garnett	368,761
2	(United States) Sam Ryder	314,306
3	(Mexico) Abraham Ancer	295,528
4	(United States) Andrew Landry	292,939
5	(Germany) Stephan Jäger	278,364

=== Finals money list ===
The Finals money list was based on prize money won during the Web.com Tour Finals, calculated in U.S. dollars. The top 25 players on the Finals money list (not otherwise exempt) earned status to play on the 2018–19 PGA Tour.

Position	Player	Prize money ($)
1	(United States) Chesson Hadley	298,125
2	(United States) Peter Uihlein	185,864
3	(United States) Jonathan Byrd	185,480
4	(United States) Nicholas Lindheim	183,020
5	(United States) Rob Oppenheim	161,150

== Awards ==
Award	Winner	Ref.
Player of the Year (Jack Nicklaus Trophy)	(United States) Chesson Hadley	
