= Ben Griffin (golfer) =

American professional golfer (born 1996)

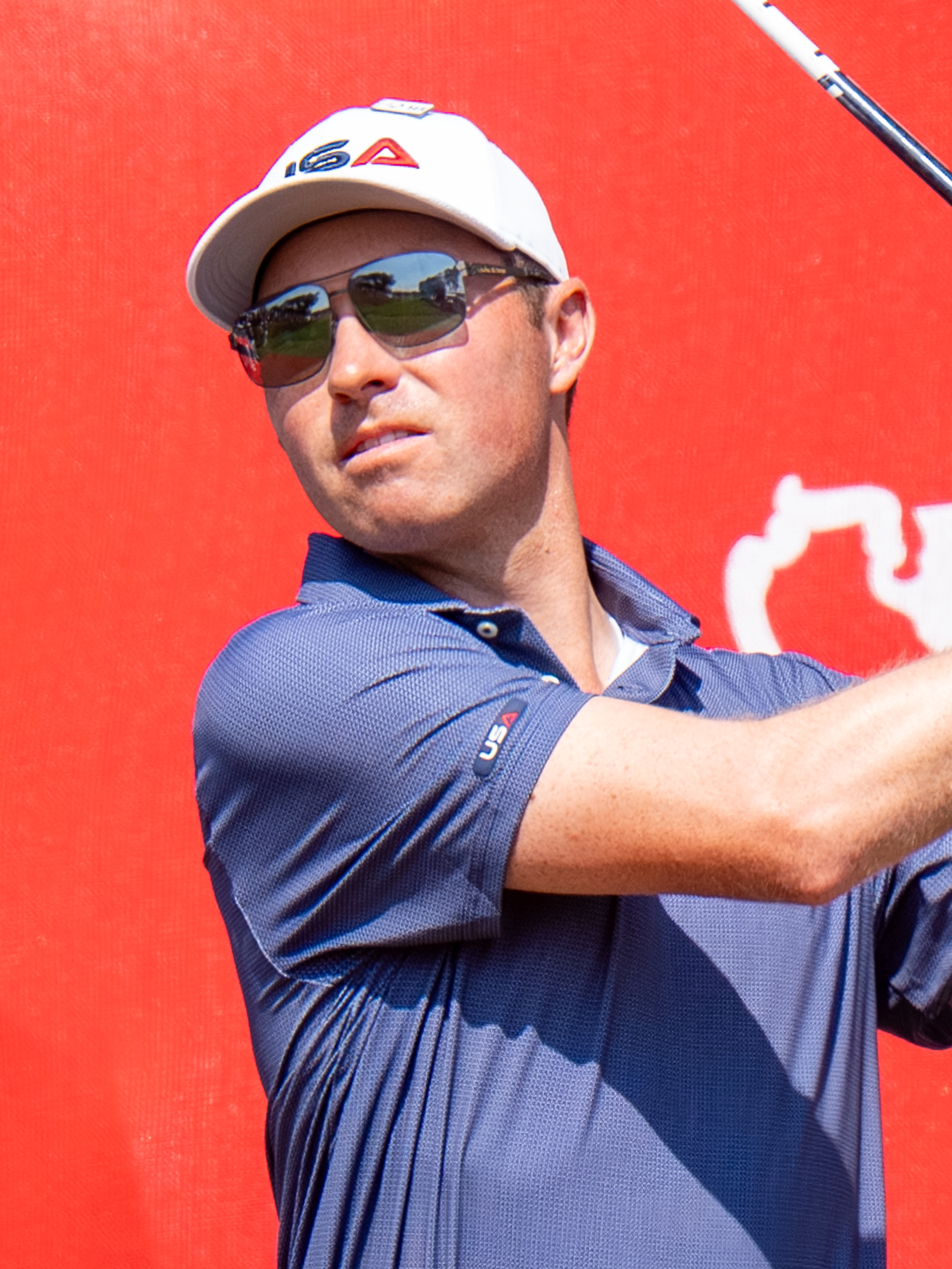
- Griffin at the 2025 Ryder Cup

Personal information
- Full name: Benjamin Griffin
- Nickname: Benny Booms
- Nationality: United States
- Born: May 6, 1996 (age 30) Chapel Hill, North Carolina, U.S.
- Height: 6 ft 1 in (185 cm)
- Weight: 185 lb (84 kg)

Career
- Sport: Golf
- College: North Carolina
- Turned professional: 2018
- Current tour: PGA Tour
- Former tours: PGA Tour Canada; PGA Tour Latinoamérica; LocaliQ Series
- Professional wins: 4
- Highest ranking: 8 (December 21, 2025) (as of October 25, 2026)

Number of wins by tour
- PGA Tour: 3
- Other: 1

Best results in major championships
- Masters Tournament: T33: 2026
- PGA Championship: T8: 2025
- U.S. Open: T10: 2025
- The Open Championship: T59: 2026

Benjamin Griffin (born May 6, 1996) is an American professional golfer who plays on the PGA Tour.

== Amateur career ==
Griffin attended East Chapel Hill High School in Chapel Hill, North Carolina, where he won two NCHSAA 4A individual state championships. He then played college golf at the University of North Carolina at Chapel Hill from 2014 to 2018, winning three tournaments and being named a two-time honorable mention All-America.

== Professional career ==
Griffin turned professional in 2018 after graduating from North Carolina and began playing on the PGA Tour Canada. He won the Staal Foundation Open in July. In 2019, he played on the PGA Tour Canada and Korn Ferry Tour with limited success. In 2020, he played on the PGA Tour Latinoamérica and LocaliQ Series (due to the COVID-19 pandemic). He stepped away from golf for most of 2021 and worked as a loan officer for a mortgage group in North Carolina. He returned to golf and earned his Korn Ferry Tour card for 2022 via Q-school.

In 2022, Griffin played on the Korn Ferry Tour and finished runner-up in three events: Astara Golf Championship, LECOM Suncoast Classic, and BMW Charity Pro-Am. He finished 8th on the regular season points list to earn his PGA Tour card for 2023. He has two runner-up finishes on the PGA Tour: the 2023 Sanderson Farms Championship and 2024 RBC Canadian Open.

He earned his first PGA Tour win at the 2025 Zurich Classic of New Orleans with partner Andrew Novak. Griffin then followed that up less than one month later, winning the Charles Schwab Challenge on May 25, 2025.

On August 27, 2025, he was named to the USA team for the 2025 Ryder Cup by team captain, Keegan Bradley.

Sunday November 9,2025 - Griffin started the day 2 shots behind the 54-hole leader, Garrick Higgo, and shot a 9 under 63 to win the World Wide Technology Championship in Mexico by 2 shots for his 3rd PGA victory. The 259 stroke total also broke the tournament record by 2 strokes.

== Personal life ==
Griffin's great-grandfather, Ben Shields, was a Major League Baseball pitcher for the New York Yankees, Boston Red Sox, and Philadelphia Phillies in the 1920s and 1930s.

Griffin suffers from symptomatic eye floaters, which is why he often wears sunglasses.

On December 6, 2025, Griffin married Dana Myeroff in Palm Beach, Florida. They met during a night out in Florida. After two years of dating, he proposed in Sea Island, Georgia.

== Amateur wins ==
- 2013 Rolex Tournament of Champions
- 2014 Tar Heel Intercollegiate, Bridgestone Collegiate
- 2017 Tar Heel Intercollegiate

== Professional wins (4) ==
=== PGA Tour wins (3) ===
No.	Date	Tournament	Winning score	Margin of victory	Runner(s)-up
1	Apr 27, 2025	Zurich Classic of New Orleans (with (United States) Andrew Novak)	−28 (62-66-61-71=260)	1 stroke	(Denmark) Nicolai Højgaard and (Denmark) Rasmus Højgaard
2	May 25, 2025	Charles Schwab Challenge	−12 (66-63-68-71=268)	1 stroke	(Germany) Matti Schmid
3	Nov 9, 2025	World Wide Technology Championship	−29 (65-65-66-63=259)	2 strokes	(United States) Chad Ramey, (Finland) Sami Välimäki

PGA Tour playoff record (0–1)

No.	Year	Tournament	Opponents	Result
1	2023	Sanderson Farms Championship	(Sweden) Ludvig Åberg, (United States) Luke List, (Sweden) Henrik Norlander, (United States) Scott Stallings	List won with birdie on first extra hole

=== PGA Tour Canada wins (1) ===
No.	Date	Tournament	Winning score	Margin of victory	Runner-up
1	Jul 15, 2018	Staal Foundation Open	−22 (68-68-66-64=266)	1 stroke	(Canada) Riley Wheeldon

== Playoff record ==
Korn Ferry Tour playoff record (0–1)

No.	Year	Tournament	Opponent	Result
1	2022	BMW Charity Pro-Am	(United States) Robby Shelton	Lost to par on second extra hole

== Results in major championships ==
Tournament	2023	2024	2025	2026
Masters Tournament				T33
PGA Championship	CUT	WD	T8	T14
U.S. Open			T10	T17
The Open Championship	CUT	CUT	CUT	T59

Top 10
Did not play

CUT = missed the halfway cut
WD = withdrew
"T" = tied

=== Summary ===
Tournament	Wins	2nd	3rd	Top-5	Top-10	Top-25	Events	Cuts made
Masters Tournament	0	0	0	0	0	0	1	1
PGA Championship	0	0	0	0	1	2	4	2
U.S. Open	0	0	0	0	1	2	2	2
The Open Championship	0	0	0	0	0	0	4	1
Totals	0	0	0	0	2	4	11	6

- Most consecutive cuts made – 4 (2026 Masters – 2026 Open Championship, current)
- Longest streak of top-10s – 2 (2025 PGA – 2025 U.S. Open)

== Results in The Players Championship ==
Tournament	2023	2024	2025	2026
The Players Championship	T35	CUT	CUT	CUT

CUT = missed the half-way cut
"T" = tied for place

== Results in World Golf Championships ==
Tournament	2023
Match Play	T31

"T" = tied for place

== Team appearances ==
Professional

- Aruba Cup (representing PGA Tour Canada): 2018
- Ryder Cup: 2025

== See also ==
- 2022 Korn Ferry Tour Finals graduates
