= Harrison Endycott =

Australian professional golfer (born 1996)

Personal information
- Nationality: Australia
- Born: 26 May 1996 (age 30) Sydney, Australia
- Height: 5 ft 9 in (1.75 m)
- Weight: 161 lb (73 kg; 11.5 st)

Career
- Sport: Golf
- Turned professional: 2017
- Current tour: PGA Tour
- Former tours: PGA Tour of Australasia; Korn Ferry Tour; PGA Tour Latinoamérica
- Professional wins: 1

Number of wins by tour
- Korn Ferry Tour: 1

Harrison Endycott (born 26 May 1996) is an Australian professional golfer and PGA Tour player.

== Amateur career ==
In 2016, Endycott was part of the Australian team who won the Eisenhower Trophy in Mexico. The Australian team won the 2016 event by 19 strokes after Cameron Davis and Curtis Luck finished top-two in the individual event.

== Professional career ==
Endycott turned professional in late 2017 and joined the PGA Tour of Australasia, where he lost a playoff at the 2018 Oates Vic Open. In 2019, he was runner-up at the Queensland PGA Championship behind Daniel Nisbet.

Endycott played on the PGA Tour Latinoamérica in 2018 and 2019, where he was runner-up at the 2018 Brazil Open, a stroke behind Marcelo Rozo.

In 2020, he joined the Korn Ferry Tour, where he won the 2022 Huntsville Championship, which helped him finish 21st in the rankings to graduate to the 2023 PGA Tour. He finished 129th on the FedEx Cup rankings but won the 2023 Q-School to keep full status for 2024.

== Amateur wins ==
- 2015 Avondale Amateur
- 2016 Lake Macquarie Amateur, Avondale Amateur, Riversdale Cup, South Australia Amateur Classic, Porter Cup

== Professional wins (1) ==
=== Korn Ferry Tour wins (1) ===
No.	Date	Tournament	Winning score	Margin of victory	Runner-up
1	1 May 2022	Huntsville Championship	−16 (63-67-64-70=264)	5 strokes	(England) Ben Taylor

== Playoff record ==
PGA Tour of Australasia playoff record (0–1)

No.	Year	Tournament	Opponent	Result
1	2018	Oates Vic Open	(Australia) Simon Hawkes	Lost to birdie on first extra hole

== Team appearances ==
Amateur

- Australian Junior Interstate Matches (representing New South Wales): 2013
- Australian Men's Interstate Teams Matches (representing New South Wales): 2016 (winners), 2017
- Eisenhower Trophy (representing Australia): 2016 (winners)

== See also ==
- 2022 Korn Ferry Tour Finals graduates
- 2023 PGA Tour Qualifying School graduates
