= Nick Hardy =

American professional golfer (born 1996)

Personal information
- Nationality: United States
- Born: January 26, 1996 (age 30) Northbrook, Illinois, U.S.
- Height: 6 ft 1 in (1.85 m)
- Weight: 185 lb (84 kg; 13.2 st)

Career
- Sport: Golf
- College: University of Illinois
- Turned professional: 2018
- Current tour: Korn Ferry Tour
- Former tour: PGA Tour
- Professional wins: 1

Number of wins by tour
- PGA Tour: 1

Best results in major championships
- Masters Tournament: DNP
- PGA Championship: CUT: 2023
- U.S. Open: T14: 2022
- The Open Championship: DNP

Nick Hardy (born January 26, 1996) is an American professional golfer from Northbrook, Illinois. Hardy played college golf for the University of Illinois at Urbana–Champaign men's golf team He has also played at the professional level in the U.S. Open and in the John Deere Classic. In addition, Hardy has won a number of junior championship events both in the state of Illinois and nationally.

== High school and junior amateur career ==
During his high school years, Hardy had a number of noteworthy performances. When he wasn't competing and or playing for his high school, he most frequently competed in the American Junior Golf Association (AJGA) and their tournaments. In 2012, Hardy had a number of good showings in multiple events. In the Stonehenge Junior Open, which is an event on the AJGA circuit, Hardy tied for 9th place and in the same year, tied for 4th position in the Exide Technologies Junior Open. Lastly, in 2012, Hardy capped off the year at the Jones Cup Junior Invitational with final rounds of 69 and 71, which put him in a tie for second place.

Moving into 2013, Hardy began to find his way into more prestigious events. In the 2013 AJGA Stonehenge Open, Hardy shot rounds of 69, 70, and 63 to seal the victory. In the same year, Hardy qualified for two notable tournaments in the form of the U.S. Amateur and the Illinois State Junior Championship. In the U.S. Amateur, Hardy opened with a round of 65 (−5) and advanced to the match play round of 64. Hardy earned a second place finish in the Illinois State Junior Amateur Championship in 2013, an event put on by the Chicago District Golf Association (CDGA).

While playing for his high school of Glenbrook North, Hardy helped the team to a number of runs at the state championship. He graduated as a member of the class of 2014. In the class of 2014, Hardy was considered the 14th best golfer in the nation. At the state level, Hardy found himself ranked the number two junior amateur golfer in Illinois by the AJGA.

=== Freshman year of college ===
Hardy played as a freshman for the Fighting Illini during the 2014–15 season. He recorded a season stroke average of 72.9 and racked up five top-20 finishes on the season. Hardy won the Big Ten Freshman of the Year award, was a first-team All-Big Ten player his freshman year, and was a co-champion at the Big Ten Championship.

=== 2015 U.S. Open ===
Hardy qualified for the 2015 U.S. Open at Chambers Bay in Washington state via local and sectional qualifying.

At the U.S. Open, Hardy was the last player playing on the second day and his missed putt for par on the 36th hole moved the cut line from +4 to +5 and allowed and additional 15 players to make the cut. On the final day of the tournament, Hardy shot a round of 68 (−2) for the day and finished the tournament at +10 in 52nd place.

=== Sophomore year of college ===
Over the course of the fall golf season for Illinois, Hardy recorded a stroke average of 71.66 which was the second best on the team. During the fall season, Hardy had 8 out of 12 rounds in which he shot under or even par. In the four concluding tournaments of the regular season, Hardy earned top-10 finishes in all of them. Hardy earned a top 20 finish in the Big Ten Championship. At the NCAA Championships, Hardy individually tied for 36th place. By the end of the spring season, Hardy's stroke average was 72.78.

=== Summer 2016 ===
During the summer of 2016, Hardy once again qualified for the U.S. Open, held at Oakmont Country Club. He missed the cut by four strokes. In addition to playing in the U.S. Open, Hardy won the Illinois State Amateur with a record score of 260 (−28).

=== Junior year of college ===
In the fall season, Hardy ended up recording four top-5 finishes, and in six out of the 12 rounds he played, Hardy shot a score that was under par. In addition to what he accomplished for his school, Hardy was selected to play for team USA in the Arnold Palmer Cup, where he won both of his singles matches. During the spring time season, Hardy recorded a total of six top-10 finishes, and among those was a 6th place finish at the Big Ten Championship and he would also receive All-Big Ten First Team honors in 2017. Hardy also won the NCAA West Lafayette Regional. By winning he became only the fourth regional medalist in the history of the University of Illinois.

== Professional career ==
=== 2023 ===
In April, Hardy won the PGA Tour's Zurich Classic of New Orleans, a team event, with playing partner Davis Riley. This was his first PGA Tour victory.

== Amateur wins ==
- 2013 AJGA Stonehenge Junior Open
- 2015 Big Ten Championship (tied with Carson Schaake)
- 2016 Illinois State Amateur, Wolf Run Intercollegiate
- 2017 NCAA West Lafayette Regional (tied with Andrej Bevins)
- 2018 Big Ten Championship

== Professional wins (1) ==
=== PGA Tour wins (1) ===
No.	Date	Tournament	Winning score	To par	Margin of victory	Runners-up
1	Apr 23, 2023	Zurich Classic of New Orleans (with (United States) Davis Riley)	64-66-63-65=258	−30	2 strokes	(Canada) Adam Hadwin and (Canada) Nick Taylor

== Playoff record ==
Korn Ferry Tour playoff record (0–1)

No.	Year	Tournament	Opponent	Result
1	2022	NV5 Invitational	(England) Harry Hall	Lost to birdie on third extra hole

== Results in major championships ==
Results not in chronological order in 2020.

Tournament	2015	2016	2017	2018
Masters Tournament				
U.S. Open	T52	CUT		
The Open Championship				
PGA Championship				

Tournament	2019	2020	2021	2022	2023	2024	2025	2026
Masters Tournament								
PGA Championship					CUT			
U.S. Open	CUT			T14	T20			CUT
The Open Championship		NT						

Did not play

CUT = missed the half-way cut
"T" = tied
NT = no tournament due to the COVID-19 pandemic

== Results in The Players Championship ==
Tournament	2023	2024
The Players Championship	CUT	CUT

CUT = missed the halfway cut

== U.S. national team appearances ==
Amateur

- Arnold Palmer Cup: 2017 (winners)

== See also ==
- 2021 Korn Ferry Tour Finals graduates
- 2022 Korn Ferry Tour Finals graduates
