= Paul Haley II =

American golfer

Personal information
- Nationality: United States
- Born: January 20, 1988 (age 38) Dallas, Texas, U.S.
- Height: 5 ft 11 in (1.80 m)
- Weight: 165 lb (75 kg; 11.8 st)

Career
- Sport: Golf
- College: Georgia Tech
- Turned professional: 2011
- Current tour: PGA Tour
- Former tour: Korn Ferry Tour
- Professional wins: 2

Number of wins by tour
- Korn Ferry Tour: 2

Best results in major championships
- Masters Tournament: DNP
- PGA Championship: DNP
- U.S. Open: CUT: 2023
- The Open Championship: DNP

Paul Haley II (born January 20, 1988) is an American professional golfer who plays on the Korn Ferry Tour.

== Career ==
Haley played college golf at Georgia Tech. In his senior season, he won the Atlantic Coast Conference Championship. He turned professional after graduating in 2011.

Haley joined the Nationwide Tour in 2012 where he won his third start of the season at the Chile Classic.

== Amateur wins ==
- 2006 Texas State Amateur

== Professional wins (2) ==
=== Korn Ferry Tour wins (2) ===
No.	Date	Tournament	Winning score	Margin of victory	Runner-up
1	Mar 11, 2012	Chile Classic	−22 (67-64-64-71=266)	3 strokes	(United States) Joseph Bramlett
2	Jul 17, 2022	Memorial Health Championship	−27 (65-67-61-64=257)	3 strokes	(United States) Austin Eckroat

Korn Ferry Tour playoff record (0–1)

No.	Year	Tournament	Opponents	Result
1	2020	Utah Championship	(United States) Kyle Jones, (United States) Daniel Summerhays	Jones won with birdie on second extra hole Summerhays eliminated by par on first hole

== Results in major championships ==
Tournament	2023
Masters Tournament	
PGA Championship	
U.S. Open	CUT
The Open Championship	

Did not play

CUT = missed the half-way cut

== See also ==
- 2012 Web.com Tour graduates
- 2022 Korn Ferry Tour Finals graduates
