= Lake Charles Championship =

Tournament information
- Location: Lake Charles, Louisiana
- Established: 2020
- Course: The Country Club at the Golden Nugget
- Par: 71
- Length: 6,940 yards (6,350 m)
- Tour: Korn Ferry Tour
- Format: Stroke play
- Prize fund: US$750,000
- Final year: 2022

Tournament record score
- Aggregate: 266 Kim Seong-hyeon (2022); 266 Trevor Werbylo (2022)
- To par: −18 as above

Final champion
- (United States) Trevor Werbylo

Location map
- Location in the United States Location in Louisiana

The Lake Charles Championship was a golf tournament on the Korn Ferry Tour. It was first played in March 2022 at The Country Club at the Golden Nugget in Lake Charles, Louisiana; it had been scheduled to be played in 2020, but was canceled due to the COVID-19 pandemic.

== Winners ==
| Year | Winner | Score | To par | Margin of victory | Runner-up |
|---|---|---|---|---|---|
| 2022 | (United States) Trevor Werbylo | 266 | −18 | Playoff | (South Korea) Kim Seong-hyeon |
2021: No tournament
| 2020 | Canceled due to the COVID-19 pandemic | | | | |
