= Justin Suh =

American professional golfer (born 1997)

Personal information
- Nationality: United States
- Born: June 12, 1997 (age 29) San Jose, California, U.S.
- Height: 5 ft 8 in (1.73 m)
- Weight: 165 lb (75 kg; 11.8 st)

Career
- Sport: Golf
- College: University of Southern California
- Turned professional: 2019
- Current tour: PGA Tour
- Former tours: Korn Ferry Tour; PGA Tour Latinoamérica
- Professional wins: 2
- Highest ranking: 64 (November 5, 2023) (as of October 25, 2026)

Number of wins by tour
- Korn Ferry Tour: 2

Best results in major championships
- Masters Tournament: DNP
- PGA Championship: T26: 2023
- U.S. Open: T27: 2023
- The Open Championship: CUT: 2025

Achievements and awards
- Pac-12 Player of the Year: 2018
- Korn Ferry Tour Finals points list winner: 2022
- Korn Ferry Tour Player of the Year: 2022

Justin Suh (/ˈsʌ/; born June 12, 1997) is an American professional golfer who plays on the PGA Tour. He was number one in the World Amateur Golf Ranking between October 2018 and April 2019.

== Career ==
Suh represented the United States at the 2018 Eisenhower Trophy where he won the silver medal together with Cole Hammer and Collin Morikawa.

He attended Evergreen Valley High School in San Jose before playing college golf at University of Southern California where he was Pac-12 Player of the Year in 2018.

Suh turned professional after graduating with a degree in business administration in 2019. He played briefly on the PGA Tour Latinoamérica before joining the Korn Ferry Tour. In 2022, he posted eight top-10 finishes and 14 in the top-25 this in his first 22 starts, including a runner-up finish at the Utah Championship.

Suh won the 2022 Korn Ferry Tour Championship and ranked number one in the season-long points race, earning full status for the 2022–23 PGA Tour. He also earned exemption into the 2023 Players Championship and the 2023 U.S. Open, the first year this was on the line at the Korn Ferry Tour Finals. Suh was voted Korn Ferry Tour Player of the Year.

== Amateur wins ==
- 2013 AJGA Junior at Ruby Hill
- 2014 Santa Clara County Championship, Northern California Junior
- 2017 Annual Western Intercollegiate, Trinity Forest Invitational, Saint Mary's Invitational
- 2018 Amer Ari Invitational, Southern Highlands Collegiate, Pac-12 Championships, Northeast Amateur, Golf Club of Georgia Collegiate
- 2019 Southwestern Invitational

== Professional wins (2) ==
=== Korn Ferry Tour wins (2) ===
Legend
Finals events (1)
Other Korn Ferry Tour (1)

No.	Date	Tournament	Winning score	Margin of victory	Runner(s)-up
1	Sep 4, 2022	Korn Ferry Tour Championship	−21 (66-69-64-68=267)	2 strokes	(United States) Austin Eckroat
2	Mar 2, 2025	Visa Argentina Open	−23 (64-68-60-65=257)	5 strokes	(United States) Ian Holt, (South Korea) Kim Seong-hyeon, (United States) Cole Sherwood

== Results in major championships ==
Results not in chronological order in 2020.

Tournament	2016	2017	2018
Masters Tournament			
U.S. Open	CUT		
The Open Championship			
PGA Championship			

Tournament	2019	2020	2021	2022	2023	2024	2025
Masters Tournament							
PGA Championship					T26		
U.S. Open			CUT		T27		
The Open Championship		NT					CUT

Did not play

CUT = missed the halfway cut
T = tied
NT = no tournament due to COVID-19 pandemic

== Results in The Players Championship ==
Tournament	2023	2024
The Players Championship	T6	CUT

Top 10

CUT = missed the halfway cut
"T" indicates a tie for a place

== Results in World Golf Championships ==
Tournament	2023
Match Play	T31

"T" = Tied

== U.S. national team appearances ==
Amateur

- Arnold Palmer Cup: 2018 (winners)
- Eisenhower Trophy: 2018

== See also ==
- 2022 Korn Ferry Tour Finals graduates
