= Erik Barnes =

American professional golfer (born 1987)

Personal information
- Nationality: United States
- Born: October 22, 1987 (age 39) Kalamazoo, Michigan, U.S.
- Height: 5 ft 10 in (1.78 m)
- Weight: 175 lb (79 kg; 12.5 st)
- Spouse: Ashleigh
- Children: 3

Career
- Sport: Golf
- College: Austin Peay State University
- Turned professional: 2011
- Former tours: PGA Tour; Korn Ferry Tour; PGA Tour Canada; PGA Tour Latinoamérica; NGA Pro Golf Tour
- Professional wins: 2

Best results in major championships
- Masters Tournament: DNP
- PGA Championship: DNP
- U.S. Open: CUT: 2022
- The Open Championship: DNP

Erik Barnes (born October 22, 1987) is an American professional golfer.

== Early life and amateur career ==
Barnes was born in Kalamazoo, Michigan. He was raised in Marion, Indiana, where he attended Marion High School. He played college golf at Austin Peay State University located in Clarksville, Tennessee. He was named Ohio Valley Athletic Conference freshmen of the year in 2007 and player of the year in 2009. In 2011, he graduated.

== Professional career ==
In 2011, Barnes turned professional. For the next three years, he played on mini-tours like NGA Hooters Tour, PGA Tour Canada, and PGA Tour Latinoamérica. He won the Avoca Classic at Scotch Hall Preserve and recorded five other top-ten finishes.

== Amateur wins ==
- 2007 ASU Indian Classic
- 2008 F&M Bank APSU Intercollegiate
- 2009 UK Bluegrass Invitational, Indiana Amateur, Belmont vs Austin Peay Shootout

== Professional wins (2) ==
=== NGA Hooters Tour wins (1) ===
- 2011 Avoca Classic

=== Other wins (1) ===
- 2020 Jamaica Open

== Playoff record ==
PGA Tour playoff record (0–1)

No.	Year	Tournament	Opponent	Result
1	2024	Puerto Rico Open	(United States) Brice Garnett	Lost to birdie on fourth extra hole

== Results in major championships ==
Tournament	2022
Masters Tournament	
PGA Championship	
U.S. Open	CUT
The Open Championship	

Did not play

CUT = missed the half-way cut

== Results in The Players Championship ==
Tournament	2023
The Players Championship	CUT

CUT = missed the halfway cut

== See also ==
- 2022 Korn Ferry Tour Finals graduates
