= 2023 PGA Tour Qualifying School graduates =

This is a list of the five players who earned 2024 PGA Tour cards through Q School in 2023. It was the first time since 2012 that Q School had given direct access to the PGA Tour.

Place	Player	PGA Tour starts	Cuts made	Notes
1	(Australia) Harrison Endycott	33	13	1 Korn Ferry Tour win
2	(United States) Trace Crowe	3	2	1 Korn Ferry Tour win
3	(United States) Blaine Hale Jr.	0	0	
T4	(Mexico) Raúl Pereda	1	1	
T4	(United States) Hayden Springer	4	0	Won 2023 PGA Tour Canada Order of Merit

PGA Tour rookie in 2024

== Results on the PGA Tour in 2024 ==
Player	Starts	Cuts made	Best finish	Earnings ($)	FedEx Cup rank
(Australia) Harrison Endycott	14	5	T33	112,809	201
(United States) Trace Crowe*	25	13	T7	698,201	148
(United States) Blaine Hale Jr.	24	5	T37	108,473	202
(Mexico) Raúl Pereda	24	3	T42	48,617	218
(United States) Hayden Springer	26	13	T3	1,149,279	127

- Retained his PGA Tour card for 2025: won or finished in the top 125 of the final FedEx Cup points list through the 2024 Fed Ex Cup Fall Season.
- Retained PGA Tour conditional status for 2025: finished between 126 and 150 on the final FedEx Cup list through the 2024 Fed Ex Cup Fall Season.
- Failed to retain his PGA Tour card for 2025: finished lower than 150 on the final FedEx Cup list through the 2024 Fed Ex Cup Fall Season.

== See also ==
- 2023 Korn Ferry Tour graduates
- 2023 Race to Dubai dual card winners
