= Brice Garnett =

American professional golfer (born 1983)

Personal information
- Full name: Brice Patrick Garnett
- Nationality: United States
- Born: September 6, 1983 (age 43) Gallatin, Missouri, U.S.
- Height: 5 ft 11 in (1.80 m)
- Weight: 175 lb (79 kg; 12.5 st)

Career
- Sport: Golf
- College: Missouri Western State University
- Turned professional: 2006
- Current tour: PGA Tour
- Former tours: Web.com Tour eGolf Professional Tour
- Professional wins: 7

Number of wins by tour
- PGA Tour: 2
- Korn Ferry Tour: 2
- Other: 3

Best results in major championships
- Masters Tournament: DNP
- PGA Championship: T35: 2024
- U.S. Open: CUT: 2012, 2017
- The Open Championship: DNP

Achievements and awards
- Web.com Tour regular season money list winner: 2017

Brice Patrick Garnett (born September 6, 1983) is an American professional golfer who has played on the PGA Tour.

== Career ==
Garnett attended Missouri Western State University. He was a three-time NCAA Division II All-American.

In 2006, Garnett turned pro. He played on the Adams Pro Tour from 2007 to 2009. From 2010 to 2013, he played on the Web.com Tour. Garnett improved his money list rank each season, culminating with a 14th-place finish in 2013 which earned him a card for the 2014 PGA Tour. During his rookie season on the PGA Tour, he made 20 cuts in 28 events, highlighted by a tie for seventh at the Shell Houston Open. He qualified for the 2014 FedEx Cup Playoffs, one of only two rookies to do so, the other being Chesson Hadley.

In 2016, Garnett finished 177th on the PGA Tour and had to go to qualifying school to earn a place on the Web.com Tour for 2017. He tied for 19th at Q-school and then won two tournaments in 2017 to finish in first place in the regular season rankings, earning a return to the PGA Tour.

Garnett earned his first PGA Tour win in 2018 at the Corales Puntacana Resort and Club Championship. He also won the Puerto Rico Open in 2024.

== Awards and honors ==
In 2017, Garnett won the Web.com Tour money list.

== Professional wins (7) ==
=== PGA Tour wins (2) ===
No.	Date	Tournament	Winning score	To par	Margin of victory	Runner-up
1	Mar 25, 2018	Corales Puntacana Resort and Club Championship	63-68-69-70=270	−18	4 strokes	(United States) Keith Mitchell
2	Mar 10, 2024	Puerto Rico Open	66-66-68-69=269	−19	Playoff	(United States) Erik Barnes

PGA Tour playoff record (1–0)

No.	Year	Tournament	Opponent	Result
1	2024	Puerto Rico Open	(United States) Erik Barnes	Won with birdie on fourth extra hole

=== Web.com Tour wins (2) ===
No.	Date	Tournament	Winning score	To par	Margin of victory	Runners-up
1	Jul 16, 2017	Utah Championship	64-65-69-65=263	−21	1 stroke	(Mexico) Abraham Ancer, (United States) Austin Cook, (United States) Rob Oppenheim
2	Aug 27, 2017	WinCo Foods Portland Open	71-67-63-65=266	−18	4 strokes	(Mexico) Abraham Ancer, (United States) Sam Ryder, (Canada) Ben Silverman, (England) David Skinns

=== eGolf Professional Tour wins (2) ===
No.	Date	Tournament	Winning score	To par	Margin of victory	Runner-up
1	Jun 4, 2011	River Hills Classic	61-70-67-66=264	−21	5 strokes	(United States) Jason Kokrak
2	Jul 16, 2011	Southern Open	65-70-64-64=263	−22	2 strokes	(United States) Clint Jensen

=== Adams Pro Tour wins (1) ===
- 2010 Mary Bird Perkins Open

== Results in major championships ==
Tournament	2012	2013	2014	2015	2016	2017	2018
Masters Tournament							
U.S. Open	CUT					CUT	
The Open Championship							
PGA Championship							T50

Tournament	2019	2020	2021	2022	2023	2024
Masters Tournament						
PGA Championship						T35
U.S. Open						
The Open Championship						

Did not play

CUT = missed the half-way cut
"T" = tied

== Results in The Players Championship ==
Tournament	2015	2016	2017	2018	2019
The Players Championship	CUT			T41	T35

Tournament	2020	2021	2022	2023	2024	2025
The Players Championship	C	CUT	T50		T35	CUT

Did not play

CUT = missed the halfway cut
"T" indicates a tie for a place
C = Canceled after the first round due to the COVID-19 pandemic

== See also ==
- 2013 Web.com Tour Finals graduates
- 2017 Web.com Tour Finals graduates
- 2022 Korn Ferry Tour Finals graduates
