= Yuan Yechun =

Chinese professional golfer (born 1997)

Personal information
- Nickname: Carl
- Nationality: China
- Born: 21 March 1997 (age 29) Dalian, China
- Height: 5 ft 10 in (178 cm)
- Weight: 195 lb (88 kg)

Career
- Sport: Golf
- College: University of Washington
- Turned professional: 2018
- Current tour: PGA Tour
- Former tours: Korn Ferry Tour; PGA Tour China
- Professional wins: 2
- Highest ranking: 99 (11 September 2022) (as of 25 October 2026)

Number of wins by tour
- Korn Ferry Tour: 1
- Other: 1

Best results in major championships
- Masters Tournament: DNP
- PGA Championship: DNP
- U.S. Open: CUT: 2026
- The Open Championship: DNP

Achievements and awards
- Korn Ferry Tour regular season points list winner: 2022
Medal record
Asian Games
Silver medal – second place	2018 Jakarta–Palembang	Men's team

Yuan Yechun (born 21 March 1997), also known as Carl Yuan, is a Chinese professional golfer. He competed in the 2020 Summer Olympics.

Yuan has become well known for his style of play, his follow through in particular.

== Amateur career ==
Yuan played college golf at the University of Washington for three years. While at Washington, he won the Pacific Northwest Amateur in 2016.

Yuan competed in the 2018 Asian Games. He place tied for 10th in the men's individual competition and took silver in the men's team event alongside Jin Cheng, Chen Yilong, and Zhang Huachuang.

== Professional career ==
Yuan turned professional in 2018. He competed on the PGA Tour China in 2018 and won the Qingdao Championship. Since 2019, he has played on the Korn Ferry Tour. He has three runner-up finishes on the Korn Ferry Tour: 2020 Pinnacle Bank Championship, 2020 WinCo Foods Portland Open, and 2021 Simmons Bank Open.

Yuan qualified for the 2020 Tokyo Olympics and finished tied for 38th in the men's individual competition.

Yuan finished the 2022–23 season 126th in the FedEx Cup standings, but regained full PGA Tour privileges after Jon Rahm signed with LIV Golf.

== Amateur wins ==
- 2013 Junior All-Star at Mission Inn, Scott Robertson Memorial, Beijing Junior Open
- 2015 China Team Championship
- 2016 Pacific Northwest Amateur, China Team Championship

== Professional wins (2) ==
=== Korn Ferry Tour wins (1) ===
No.	Date	Tournament	Winning score	Margin of victory	Runner-up
1	20 Mar 2022	Chitimacha Louisiana Open	−14 (68-66-71-65=270)	Playoff	(United States) Peter Uihlein

Korn Ferry Tour playoff record (1–0)

No.	Year	Tournament	Opponent	Result
1	2022	Chitimacha Louisiana Open	(United States) Peter Uihlein	Won with birdie on first extra hole

=== PGA Tour China wins (1) ===
No.	Date	Tournament	Winning score	Margin of victory	Runner-up
1	22 Jul 2018	Qingdao Championship	−6 (66-71-73-72=282)	1 stroke	(England) Callum Tarren

== Results in major championships ==
Tournament	2026
Masters Tournament	
PGA Championship	
U.S. Open	CUT
The Open Championship	

Did not play

CUT = missed the half-way cut
T = tied

== Results in World Golf Championships ==
Tournament	2018	2019
Championship		
Match Play		
Invitational		
Champions	T35	T17

Did not play

"T" = tied

== See also ==
- 2022 Korn Ferry Tour Finals graduates
