= Kim Seong-hyeon (golfer) =

South Korean professional golfer (born 1998)

Personal information
- Nationality: South Korea
- Born: 17 September 1998 (age 28) Changwon, South Korea
- Height: 5 ft 11 in (180 cm)
- Weight: 180 lb (82 kg)

Career
- Sport: Golf
- College: Korea National Sport University
- Turned professional: 2017
- Current tours: Korean Tour; PGA Tour
- Former tours: Japan Golf Tour; Korn Ferry Tour
- Professional wins: 4

Number of wins by tour
- Japan Golf Tour: 1
- Korn Ferry Tour: 1
- Other: 2

Best results in major championships
- Masters Tournament: DNP
- PGA Championship: T63: 2024
- U.S. Open: T56: 2024
- The Open Championship: DNP

Achievements and awards
- Korn Ferry Tour Rookie of the Year: 2022
Medal record
Men's golf
Representing South Korea
Asian Games
Silver medal – second place	2026 Aichi–Nagoya	Men's team

Kim Seong-hyeon (Korean: 김성현; born 17 September 1998), also known as S. H. Kim, is a South Korean professional golfer who plays on the PGA Tour and the Korean Tour. He has also played on the Korn Ferry Tour and the Japan Golf Tour. He won the 2020 KPGA Championship on the Korean Tour and the 2021 Japan PGA Championship on the Japan Golf Tour.

== Professional career ==
Kim turned professional in late 2017. In late 2018, he finished 4th in the Japan Golf Tour Qualifying School to gain a place on the tour for 2019. In 2019, he played on the main Japanese tour but also played a number of events on the second-tier Japan Challenge Tour, winning the Heiwa PGM Challenge I Road To Championship in May. Kim was a surprise winner of the 2020 KPGA Championship. At the time, he wasn't a full Korean Tour member and only played after playing in a Monday qualifying event in which he finished in the final qualifying place. He made a birdie at the 17th hole and had a final round of 67 to win by one stroke. His win gave him a place on the Korean Tour for the following five years and entry into the CJ Cup on the 2020–21 PGA Tour.

In May 2021, Kim had a final round of 58 in the Golf Partner Pro-Am Tournament, finishing in a tie for 11th place. In July, he won the Japan PGA Championship by a stroke from Yuta Ikeda and Yuki Inamori, his first win on the Japan Golf Tour.

Kim played primarily on the Korn Ferry Tour in 2022 and earned his PGA Tour card for the 2022–23 season through the Korn Ferry Tour Finals. He was voted 2022 Korn Ferry Tour Rookie of the year.

== Professional wins (4) ==
=== Japan Golf Tour wins (1) ===
Legend
Japan majors (1)
Other Japan Golf Tour (0)

No.	Date	Tournament	Winning score	Margin of victory	Runners-up
1	4 Jul 2021	Japan PGA Championship	−13 (66-70-67-68=271)	1 stroke	(Japan) Yuta Ikeda, (Japan) Yuki Inamori

=== Korn Ferry Tour wins (1) ===
No.	Date	Tournament	Winning score	Margin of victory	Runner-up
1	18 May 2025	AdventHealth Championship	−20 (66-65-66-71=268)	3 strokes	(United States) Blaine Hale Jr.

Korn Ferry Tour playoff record (0–2)

No.	Year	Tournament	Opponent	Result
1	2022	Lake Charles Championship	(United States) Trevor Werbylo	Lost to birdie on third extra hole
2	2025	The Bahamas Golf Classic	(United States) Hank Lebioda	Lost to birdie on first extra hole

=== Korean Tour wins (1) ===
No.	Date	Tournament	Winning score	Margin of victory	Runners-up
1	9 Aug 2020	KPGA Championship	−5 (70-65-73-67=275)	1 stroke	(South Korea) Ham Jeong-woo, (South Korea) Lee Jae-kyeong

=== Japan Challenge Tour wins (1) ===
No.	Date	Tournament	Winning score	Margin of victory	Runners-up
1	17 May 2019	Heiwa PGM Challenge I Road To Championship	−10 (68-68-64=200)	2 strokes	(Malaysia) Nicholas Fung, (Japan) Yoshikazu Haku

== Results in major championships ==
Tournament	2024
Masters Tournament	
PGA Championship	T63
U.S. Open	T56
The Open Championship	

Did not play

"T" = tied

== Results in The Players Championship ==
Tournament	2023	2024	2025	2026
The Players Championship	CUT		CUT	

Did not play

CUT = missed the halfway cut

== See also ==
- 2022 Korn Ferry Tour Finals graduates
- 2025 Korn Ferry Tour graduates
- Lowest rounds of golf
