= Justin Lower =

American professional golfer (born 1989)

Personal information
- Nationality: United States
- Born: April 4, 1989 (age 37) Akron, Ohio, U.S.
- Height: 5 ft 10 in (178 cm)
- Weight: 175 lb (79 kg)

Career
- Sport: Golf
- College: Malone University
- Turned professional: 2011
- Current tour: PGA Tour
- Former tour: Korn Ferry Tour
- Professional wins: 2
- Highest ranking: 74 (January 19, 2025) (as of October 25, 2026)

Best results in major championships
- Masters Tournament: DNP
- PGA Championship: T60: 2025
- U.S. Open: T50: 2024
- The Open Championship: DNP

Justin Lower (born April 4, 1989) is an American professional golfer.

== Amateur career ==
Lower competed for Malone University in college. He was the 2010 NAIA champion.

== Professional career ==
Lower began playing on the Web.com Tour (now Korn Ferry Tour) in 2014.

Lower won the Ohio Open in 2012 and 2015.

He won the Pro-Am division of the 2021 Korn Ferry BMW Charity Pro-Am with playing partner Doug Walker.

In 2021, he secured his PGA Tour card for the 2021–22 season on the last hole of the Korn Ferry Tour Championship.

== Amateur wins ==
- 2010 NAIA Men's Golf Championship

== Professional wins (2) ==
- 2012 Ohio Open
- 2015 Ohio Open

== Playoff record ==
Korn Fery Tour playoff record (0–1)

No.	Year	Tournament	Opponent	Result
1	2019	Chitimacha Louisiana Open	(United States) Vince Covello	Lost to birdie on third extra hole

== Results in major championships ==
Tournament	2024	2025
Masters Tournament		
PGA Championship		T60
U.S. Open	T50	CUT
The Open Championship		

Did not play

CUT = missed the half-way cut
"T" = tied

== Results in The Players Championship ==
Tournament	2023	2024	2025
The Players Championship	CUT	CUT	T38

CUT = missed the halfway cut

== See also ==
- 2021 Korn Ferry Tour Finals graduates
