= KC Golf Classic =

AdventHealth Championship

Tournament information
- Location: Kansas City, Missouri
- Established: 2009
- Course: Blue Hills Country Club
- Par: 72
- Length: 7,364 yards (6,734 m)
- Tour: Korn Ferry Tour
- Format: Stroke play
- Prize fund: US$1,000,000
- Month played: August

Tournament record score
- Aggregate: 258 James Nitties (2011); 258 Martin Piller (2015)
- To par: −29 Yuta Sugiura (2026)

Current champion
- (Japan) Yuta Sugiura

Location map
- Location in the United States Location in Missouri

The AdventHealth Championship is a Korn Ferry Tour event that was played for the first time in 2009 as the Christmas in October Classic. It has been played at the Nicklaus Golf Club at LionsGate in Overland Park, Kansas and Blue Hills Country Club in Kansas City, Missouri. The tournament took a hiatus in 2010, and returned as the Midwest Classic in 2011 with the Kansas City Crusaders as the host organization. The event was renamed as the KC Golf Classic in 2018.

== Winners ==
| Year | Winner | Score | To par | Margin of victory | Runner(s)-up |
AdventHealth Championship
| 2026 | (Japan) Yuta Sugiura | 259 | −29 | 1 stroke | (United States) Austin Hitt |
| 2025 | (South Korea) Kim Seong-hyeon | 268 | −20 | 3 strokes | (United States) Blaine Hale Jr. |
| 2024 | (United States) Harry Higgs | 269 | −19 | Playoff | (United States) Tanner Gore |
| 2023 | (United States) **Grayson Murray** | 269 | −19 | 1 stroke | (United States) **Wilson Furr** (United States) **Rico Hoey** |
| 2022 | (United States) **Trevor Cone** | 272 | −16 | 1 stroke | (United States) **Taylor Montgomery** |
| 2021 | (United States) **Cameron Young** | 269 | −19 | 2 strokes | (South Africa) Dawie van der Walt |
KC Golf Classic
| 2020 | Canceled due to the COVID-19 pandemic | | | | |
| 2019 | (United States) **Michael Gellerman** | 277 | −11 | 1 stroke | (United States) **Harry Higgs** (Argentina) **Nelson Ledesma** |
| 2018 | (Austria) Sepp Straka | 262 | −22 | 1 stroke | (United States) **Kyle Jones** |
Digital Ally Open
| 2017 | (China) **Dou Zecheng** | 259 | −25 | 3 strokes | (United States) Luke Guthrie (United States) Billy Kennerly (United States) **Kyle Thompson** |
| 2016 | (United States) **Wesley Bryan** | 264 | −20 | Playoff | (United States) **Grayson Murray** (United States) **J. T. Poston** |
| 2015 | (United States) **Martin Piller** | 258 | −26 | 4 strokes | (United States) **Darron Stiles** |
Midwest Classic
| 2014 | (United States) **Zack Sucher** | 265 | −19 | 3 strokes | (United States) Aaron Watkins |
| 2013 | (United States) **Jamie Lovemark** | 266 | −18 | 1 stroke | (United States) **Mark Anderson** |
| 2012 | (United States) **Shawn Stefani** | 267 | −17 | 2 strokes | (United States) **Russell Henley** (United States) **Luke List** |
| 2011 | (Australia) James Nitties | 258 | −26 | 5 strokes | (Sweden) **Jonas Blixt** (Australia) Nick Flanagan |
Christmas in October Classic
2010: No tournament
| 2009 | (Australia) **Michael Sim** | 264 | −20 | 2 strokes | (United States) **Josh Teater** |

Bolded golfers graduated to the PGA Tour via the Korn Ferry Tour regular-season money list. Golfers in bold italics achieved their third win of the season at this tournament and were promoted immediately.
