= Austin Eckroat =

American professional golfer (born 1999)

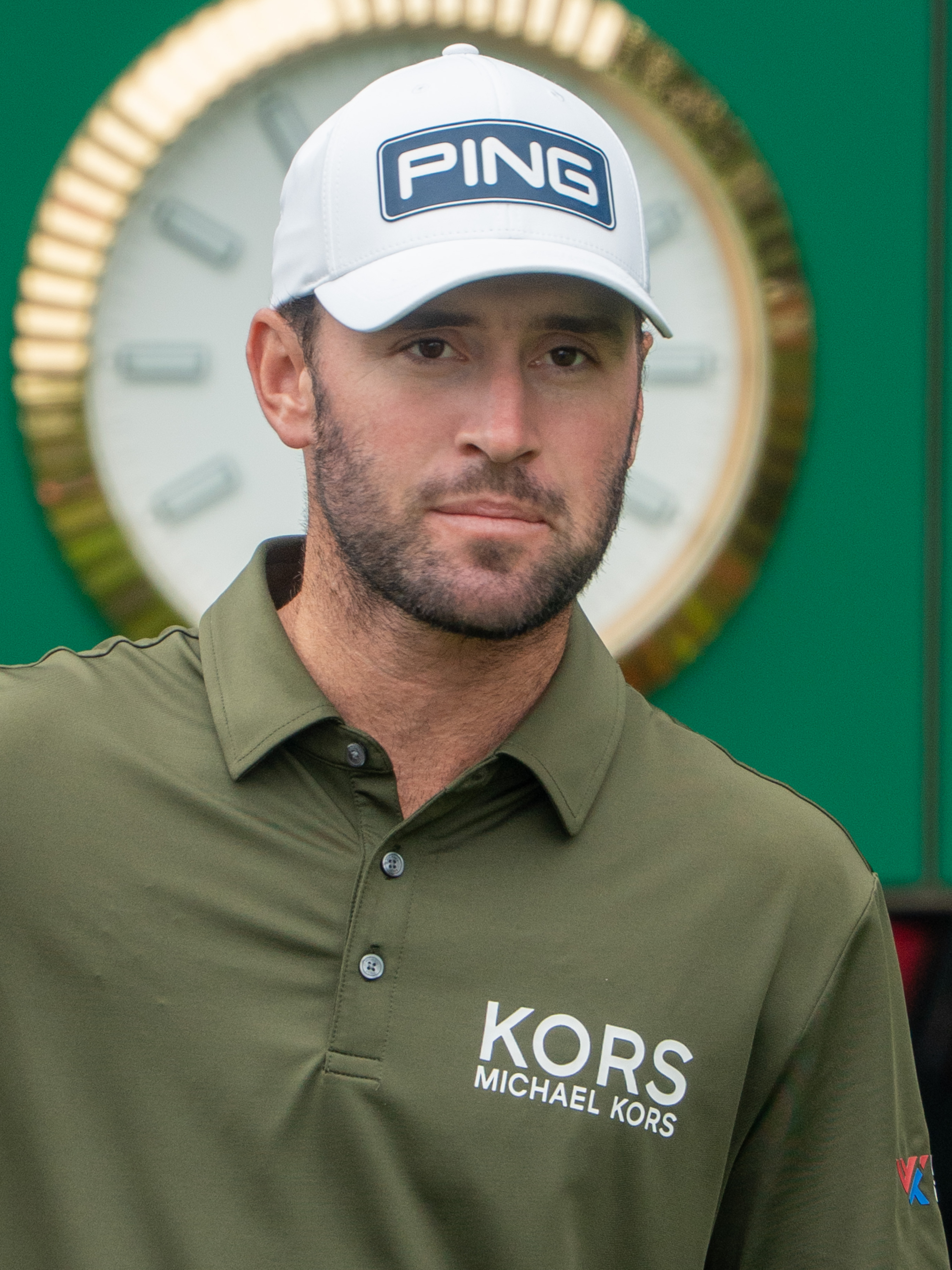
- Eckroat at the 2025 Travelers Championship

Personal information
- Nationality: United States
- Born: January 12, 1999 (age 27) Edmond, Oklahoma, U.S.
- Height: 6 ft 0 in (183 cm)
- Weight: 175 lb (79 kg)
- Spouse: Sally Merrill (m. 2022)

Career
- Sport: Golf
- College: Oklahoma State University
- Turned professional: 2021
- Current tour: PGA Tour
- Former tour: Korn Ferry Tour
- Professional wins: 2
- Highest ranking: 34 (December 15, 2024) (as of October 25, 2026)

Number of wins by tour
- PGA Tour: 2

Best results in major championships
- Masters Tournament: CUT: 2024, 2025
- PGA Championship: T18: 2024
- U.S. Open: T10: 2023
- The Open Championship: T66: 2024

Austin Eckroat (born January 12, 1999) is an American professional golfer who currently plays on the PGA Tour.

== Early years ==
Born and raised in Edmond, Oklahoma, Eckroat graduated from its North High School in 2017. He attended Oklahoma State University in Stillwater from 2017 to 2020, and was a four-time All-American with the Cowboys, who won the NCAA team title in 2018.

Eckroat also competed in the Walker Cup in 2021.

== Professional career ==
Eckroat turned professional in 2021 and earned limited status on the Korn Ferry Tour for the 2022 season through qualifying school. He played in just two events in the first half of the season and missed both cuts. His third start came at the AdventHealth Championship in May, where he tied for 23rd, earning entry into the next event and commencing a stretch of nine top-25 finishes in the final eleven regular-season events (highlighted by a runner-up finish at the Memorial Health Championship). His finish of 34th on the regular-season points list gave him access to the Korn Ferry Tour Finals, where he earned a PGA Tour card when he finished second at the Korn Ferry Tour Championship.

In May 2023, Eckroat was the runner-up at the AT&T Byron Nelson in Texas, one shot behind Jason Day. A month later in the final round of the U.S. Open, he tied the nine-hole record of 29 and tied for tenth.

In March 2024, Eckroat won his first PGA Tour event at the Cognizant Classic in Florida, three shots ahead of runners-up Erik van Rooyen and Min Woo Lee. In November 2024, he won his second title at the World Wide Technology Championship. He shot a final-round 63 to finish one stroke ahead of Justin Lower and Carson Young.

== Amateur wins ==
- 2015 Scott Robertson Memorial, Oklahoma Junior Boys
- 2016 Junior Invitational at Sage Valley
- 2018 Wyoming Desert Intercollegiate
- 2019 Querencia Cabo Collegiate

== Professional wins (2) ==
=== PGA Tour wins (2) ===
No.	Date	Tournament	Winning score	Margin of victory	Runners-up
1	Mar 4, 2024	Cognizant Classic	−17 (65-67-68-67=267)	3 strokes	(Australia) Min Woo Lee, (South Africa) Erik van Rooyen
2	Nov 10, 2024	World Wide Technology Championship	−24 (68-67-66-63=264)	1 stroke	(United States) Justin Lower, (United States) Carson Young

== Results in major championships ==
Tournament	2019	2020	2021	2022	2023	2024	2025
Masters Tournament						CUT	CUT
PGA Championship						T18	T67
U.S. Open	CUT				T10	74	
The Open Championship		NT				T66	

Top 10
Did not play

CUT = missed the half-way cut
"T" indicates a tie for a place
NT = no tournament due to COVID-19 pandemic

== Results in The Players Championship ==
Tournament	2025
The Players Championship	T61

"T" indicates a tie for a place

== U.S. national team appearances ==
Amateur

- Arnold Palmer Cup: 2019
- Walker Cup: 2021 (winners)

== See also ==
- 2022 Korn Ferry Tour Finals graduates
