= Joseph Bramlett =

American professional golfer (born 1988)

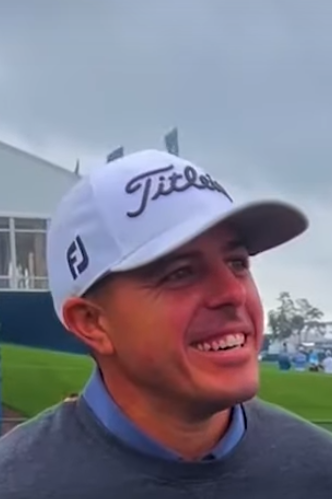
- Bramlett in 2022

Personal information
- Full name: Joseph Eugene Bramlett
- Nationality: United States
- Born: April 7, 1988 (age 38) Stanford, California, U.S.
- Height: 6 ft 4 in (1.93 m)
- Weight: 195 lb (88 kg; 13.9 st)

Career
- Sport: Golf
- College: Stanford University
- Turned professional: 2010
- Current tour: PGA Tour
- Former tour: Korn Ferry Tour
- Professional wins: 1

Number of wins by tour
- Korn Ferry Tour: 1

Best results in major championships
- Masters Tournament: DNP
- PGA Championship: DNP
- U.S. Open: T37: 2022
- The Open Championship: DNP

Achievements and awards
- Korn Ferry Tour Finals points list winner: 2020–21

Joseph Eugene Bramlett (born April 7, 1988) is an American professional golfer on the PGA Tour.

== Early life and career ==
Bramlett, a biracial African American, is a graduate of St. Francis High School in Mountain View, California. He then attended Stanford University for four years, and he earned his PGA Tour card at the 2010 Qualifying School. He was the first black golfer to graduate from the tour's qualifying school since Adrian Stills in 1985.

Bramlett made twelve of 25 cuts and finished 196th on the 2011 money list, lost his Tour card, and later joined the Web.com Tour. He finished 28th in 2012, three spots and $4,000 shy of rejoining the PGA Tour. He qualified again in 2019.

Bramlett won the Korn Ferry Tour Championship in 2021, qualifying him once again for the PGA Tour. He finished in 37th place at the 2022 U.S. Open.

Bramlett has four top-10 finishes on the PGA Tour.

== Amateur wins ==
Note: This list may be incomplete

- 2010 Northeast Amateur

== Professional wins (1) ==
=== Korn Ferry Tour wins (1) ===
Legend
Finals events (1)
Other Korn Ferry Tour (0)

No.	Date	Tournament	Winning score	Margin of victory	Runner-up
1	Sep 5, 2021	Korn Ferry Tour Championship	−20 (70-68-65-65=268)	4 strokes	(United States) Trey Mullinax

== Results in major championships ==
Results not in chronological order in 2020.

Tournament	2010	2011	2012	2013	2014	2015	2016	2017	2018
Masters Tournament									
U.S. Open	CUT								
The Open Championship									
PGA Championship									

Tournament	2019	2020	2021	2022
Masters Tournament				
PGA Championship				
U.S. Open	CUT			T37
The Open Championship		NT		

Did not play

CUT = missed the half-way cut
"T" = tied
NT = No tournament due to the COVID-19 pandemic

== Results in The Players Championship ==
Tournament	2022	2023	2024
The Players Championship	CUT	CUT	CUT

CUT = missed the halfway cut

== See also ==
- 2010 PGA Tour Qualifying School graduates
- 2019 Korn Ferry Tour Finals graduates
- 2021 Korn Ferry Tour Finals graduates
- 2022 Korn Ferry Tour Finals graduates
