= 2022 Korn Ferry Tour =

Golf tour season

2022 Korn Ferry Tour season
- Duration: January 16, 2022 – September 4, 2022
- Number of official events: 26
- Most wins: (United States) Robby Shelton (2)
- Regular season points list: (China) Yuan Yechun
- Finals points list: (United States) Justin Suh
- Player of the Year: (United States) Justin Suh
- Rookie of the Year: (South Korea) Kim Seong-hyeon

The 2022 Korn Ferry Tour was the 32nd season of the Korn Ferry Tour, the official development tour to the PGA Tour.

== Schedule ==
The following table lists official events during the 2022 season.

| Date | Tournament | Location | Purse (US$) | Winner (Note: The number in parentheses after each winner's name is the number of Korn Ferry Tour events they had won up to and including that tournament. This information is only shown for Korn Ferry Tour members. It is rare for someone to accumulate many wins on the Korn Ferry Tour as success at this level usually leads to promotion to the PGA Tour.) | OWGR points | Notes |
|---|---|---|---|---|---|---|
| Jan 19 | The Bahamas Great Exuma Classic | Bahamas | 750,000 | (United States) Akshay Bhatia (1) | 14 | |
| Jan 26 | The Bahamas Great Abaco Classic | Bahamas | 750,000 | (United States) Brandon Harkins (1) | 14 | |
| Feb 6 | Panama Championship | Panama | 750,000 | (United States) Carson Young (1) | 14 | |
| Feb 13 | Astara Golf Championship | Colombia | 750,000 | (United States) Brandon Matthews (1) | 14 | |
| Feb 20 | LECOM Suncoast Classic | Florida | 750,000 | (South Korea) An Byeong-hun (1) | 14 | |
| Mar 20 | Chitimacha Louisiana Open | Louisiana | 750,000 | (China) Yuan Yechun (1) | 14 | |
| Mar 27 | Lake Charles Championship | Louisiana | 750,000 | (United States) Trevor Werbylo (1) | 14 | New tournament (Note: Tournament's debut delayed from 2020.) |
| Apr 3 | Club Car Championship | Georgia | 750,000 | (United States) T. J. Vogel (1) | 14 | |
| Apr 16 | Veritex Bank Championship | Texas | 750,000 | (United States) Tyson Alexander (2) | 14 | |
| May 1 | Huntsville Championship | Alabama | 750,000 | (Australia) Harrison Endycott (1) | 14 | |
| May 8 | Simmons Bank Open | Tennessee | 750,000 | (United States) Brent Grant (1) | 14 | |
| May 15 | Visit Knoxville Open | Tennessee | 750,000 | (United States) Anders Albertson (2) | 14 | |
| May 22 | AdventHealth Championship | Missouri | 750,000 | (United States) Trevor Cone (2) | 14 | |
| May 29 | NV5 Invitational | Illinois | 750,000 | (England) Harry Hall (2) | 14 | |
| Jun 5 | Rex Hospital Open | North Carolina | 750,000 | (United States) Davis Thompson (1) | 14 | |
| Jun 12 | BMW Charity Pro-Am | South Carolina | 750,000 | (United States) Robby Shelton (3) | 14 | Pro-Am |
| Jun 19 | Wichita Open | Kansas | 750,000 | (United States) Norman Xiong (1) | 14 | |
| Jun 26 | Live and Work in Maine Open | Maine | 750,000 | (United States) Pierceson Coody (1) | 14 | |
| Jul 3 | The Ascendant | Colorado | 750,000 | (China) Dou Zecheng (3) | 14 | |
| Jul 17 | Memorial Health Championship | Illinois | 750,000 | (United States) Paul Haley II (2) | 14 | |
| Jul 24 | Price Cutter Charity Championship | Missouri | 750,000 | (United States) David Kocher (2) | 14 | |
| Aug 7 | Utah Championship | Utah | 750,000 | (United States) Andrew Kozan (1) | 14 | |
| Aug 14 | Pinnacle Bank Championship | Nebraska | 850,000 | (United States) Robby Shelton (4) | 14.79 | |
| Aug 21 | Albertsons Boise Open | Idaho | 1,000,000 | (United States) Will Gordon (1) | 20.13 | Finals event |
| Aug 28 | Nationwide Children's Hospital Championship | Ohio | 1,000,000 | (Sweden) David Lingmerth (2) | 19.83 | Finals event |
| Sep 4 | Korn Ferry Tour Championship | Indiana | 1,000,000 | (United States) Justin Suh (1) | 19.09 | Finals event |

== Points list ==
=== Regular season points list ===
The regular season points list was based on tournament results during the season, calculated using a points-based system. The top 25 players on the regular season points list earned status to play on the 2022–23 PGA Tour.

| Position | Player | Points |
|---|---|---|
| 1 | (China) Yuan Yechun | 1,819 |
| 2 | (United States) Robby Shelton | 1,603 |
| 3 | (United States) Paul Haley II | 1,341 |
| 4 | (China) Dou Zecheng | 1,321 |
| 5 | (United States) Taylor Montgomery | 1,216 |

=== Finals points list ===
The Finals points list was based on tournament results during the Korn Ferry Tour Finals, calculated using a points-based system. The top 25 players on the Finals points list (not otherwise exempt) earned status to play on the 2022–23 PGA Tour.

| Position | Player | Points |
|---|---|---|
| 1 | (United States) Justin Suh | 1,167 |
| 2 | (United States) Will Gordon | 1,073 |
| 3 | (Sweden) David Lingmerth | 1,000 |
| 4 | (United States) Paul Haley II | 615 |
| 5 | (United States) Austin Eckroat | 615 |

== Awards ==
| Award | Winner | Ref. |
|---|---|---|
| Player of the Year (Jack Nicklaus Trophy) | (United States) Justin Suh | |
| Rookie of the Year | (South Korea) Kim Seong-hyeon | |
