= Adam Hadwin =

Canadian professional golfer (born 1987)

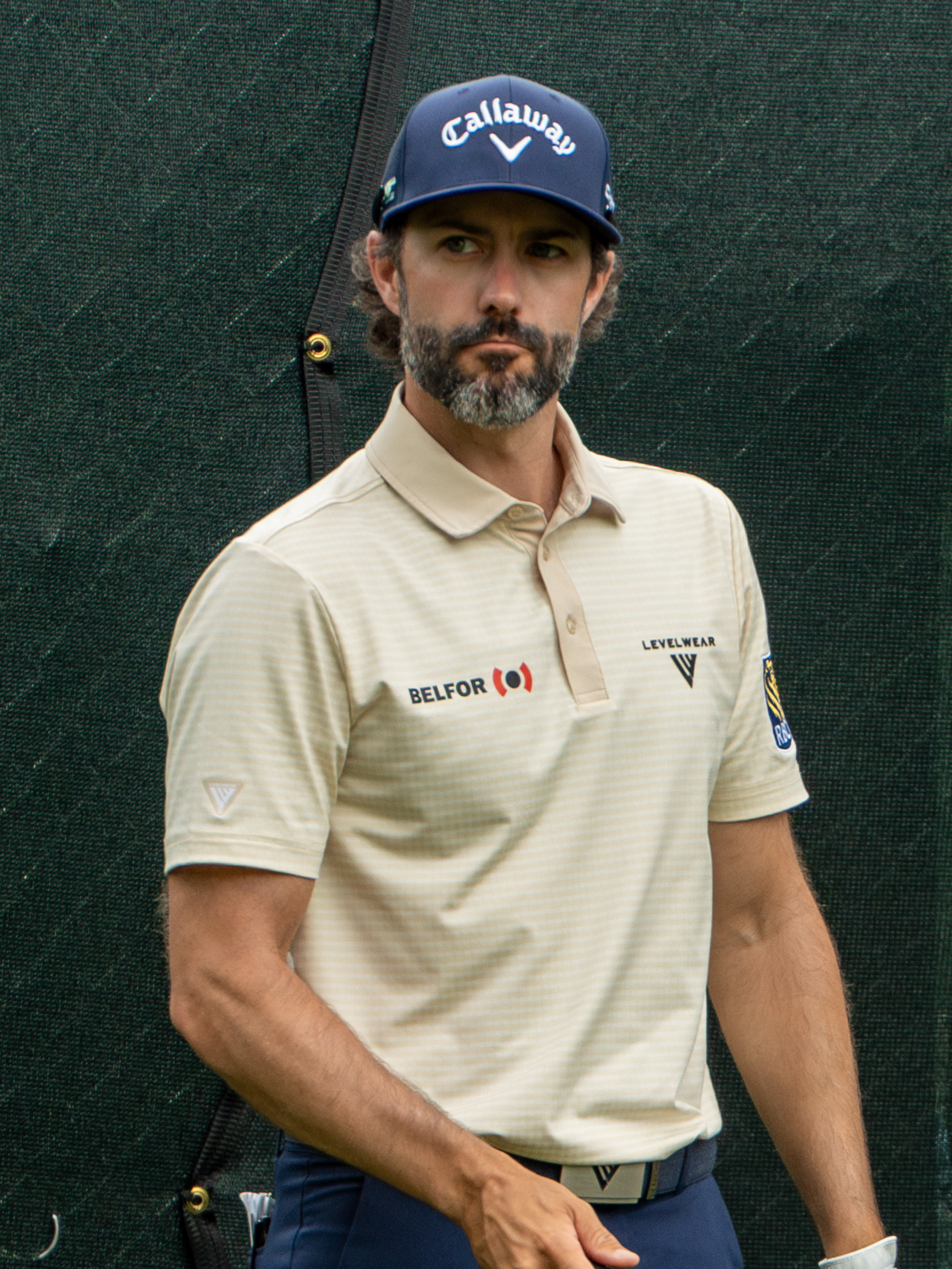
- Hadwin at the 2025 Travelers Championship

Personal information
- Full name: Adam Jerald Hadwin
- Nationality: Canada
- Born: 2 November 1987 (age 39) Moose Jaw, Saskatchewan, Canada
- Height: 5 ft 8 in (1.73 m)
- Weight: 160 lb (73 kg; 11 st)

Career
- Sport: Golf
- College: University of Louisville
- Turned professional: 2009
- Current tours: PGA Tour; Korn Ferry Tour
- Former tour: Canadian Tour
- Professional wins: 12
- Highest ranking: 35 (June 9, 2024) (as of October 25, 2026)

Number of wins by tour
- PGA Tour: 1
- Korn Ferry Tour: 2
- Other: 9

Best results in major championships
- Masters Tournament: T24: 2018
- PGA Championship: T29: 2019
- U.S. Open: T7: 2022
- The Open Championship: T35: 2018

Adam Jerald Hadwin (born 2 November 1987) is a Canadian professional golfer who plays on the Korn Ferry Tour. He has won once on the PGA Tour, twice on the Korn Ferry Tour, and twice on the Canadian Tour.

== Early life and amateur career ==
In 1987, Hadwin was born in Moose Jaw, Saskatchewan. He grew up playing golf at the Ledgeview Golf Club in Abbotsford, British Columbia; one clubmate was another top young player, Nick Taylor. His father Gerry is a golf club professional who joined the Canadian PGA in 1979. Hadwin was a member of the RCGA's 2008 Canadian men's amateur team.

He attended the University of Louisville on a golf scholarship, studying business, and earned All-America Honorable Mention honors for 2009.

== Professional career ==
In 2009, Hadwin turned professional. His first professional win came at the Ledgeview Open on the Vancouver Golf Tour (VGT). He went on to win a total of four VGT events in 2009, including the Golden Ear's Open, the Johnston Meier Insurance Open and the RBC Invitational Pro-am, asserting himself against the top professionals in Western Canada. Hadwin won a 2009 Gateway Tour Winter Series Sponsorship event.

=== Canadian Tour ===
Hadwin joined the Canadian Tour in 2010, earning exempt status in the 2010 California Winter Qualifying School. He won the Rivermead Cup as the top Canadian finisher in the 2010 RBC Canadian Open at St. George's Golf and Country Club in Toronto. This was his first PGA Tour event, and he finished at 5-under-par 279, good for a tie for 37th place. Hadwin played in the 2010 Ford Wayne Gretzky Classic, a Nationwide Tour event, finishing in a tie for 33rd place. Hadwin returned home in September and won the Vancouver Golf Tour's Vancouver City Open with a score of 204 (−10). Hadwin won the Canadian Tour's 2010 Desert Dunes Classic in the Palm Springs area, in November. He had six top-10 finishes on the Canadian Tour in 2010, and was the circuit's Canadian Rookie of the Year.

Hadwin spent time during the winter of 2010–11 playing on the South African Sunshine Tour. He won a second Canadian Tour event in March 2011, the Pacific Colombia Tour Championship, in Bogotá, Colombia, taking home US$23,400 for scoring 66-66-62-69 to win by six strokes. Hadwin finished as the top Canadian, and tied for 39th place, in the 2011 U.S. Open at Congressional Country Club near Washington, D.C.. He won $41,154. This was his first major championship. In the 2011 RBC Canadian Open at the Shaughnessy Golf & Country Club in Vancouver, Hadwin entered the final round in second place, one stroke out of the lead, following rounds of 72-66-68. Hadwin shot 72 in the final round, finished in a tie for fourth place, won $228,800 for the biggest prize of his career, and captured the Rivermead Cup for the second straight year. His position in the Official World Golf Rankings advanced from 332 to a career high of 214. By finishing in the top-10 of the RBC Canadian Open, Hadwin earned a place in the next Tour event, the Greenbrier Classic, and continued his good play there with rounds of 70-71-68-68, good for a tie for 32nd place, winning $32,485.71. He won the 2011 Vancouver Open on the Vancouver Golf Tour, scoring 65-65-73 and then winning a playoff over Brad Clapp. He was given a sponsor's exemption into the 2011 Fry's.com Open where he took home $130,312 for a T-7th finish after shooting rounds of 71-68-64-70. Hadwin attempted to qualify for the PGA Tour through Q School. He finished tied for 100th.

=== Nationwide Tour ===
Hadwin earned conditional Nationwide Tour status for 2012 based on his Q school finish. After a slow start to the year, he had a T-5 finish at the Soboba Golf Classic in April. After only making four of his next eight cuts, he finished with 63–66 over the weekend of the Cox Classic in August to secure a T-3 finish. Overall, for the year, he made 13 of 25 cuts, with four top-10 finishes with two third-place finishes, but only finished 30th on the money list, not earning a PGA Tour card.

In 2013, Hadwin is playing a full season on the Web.com Tour based on his 2012 season.

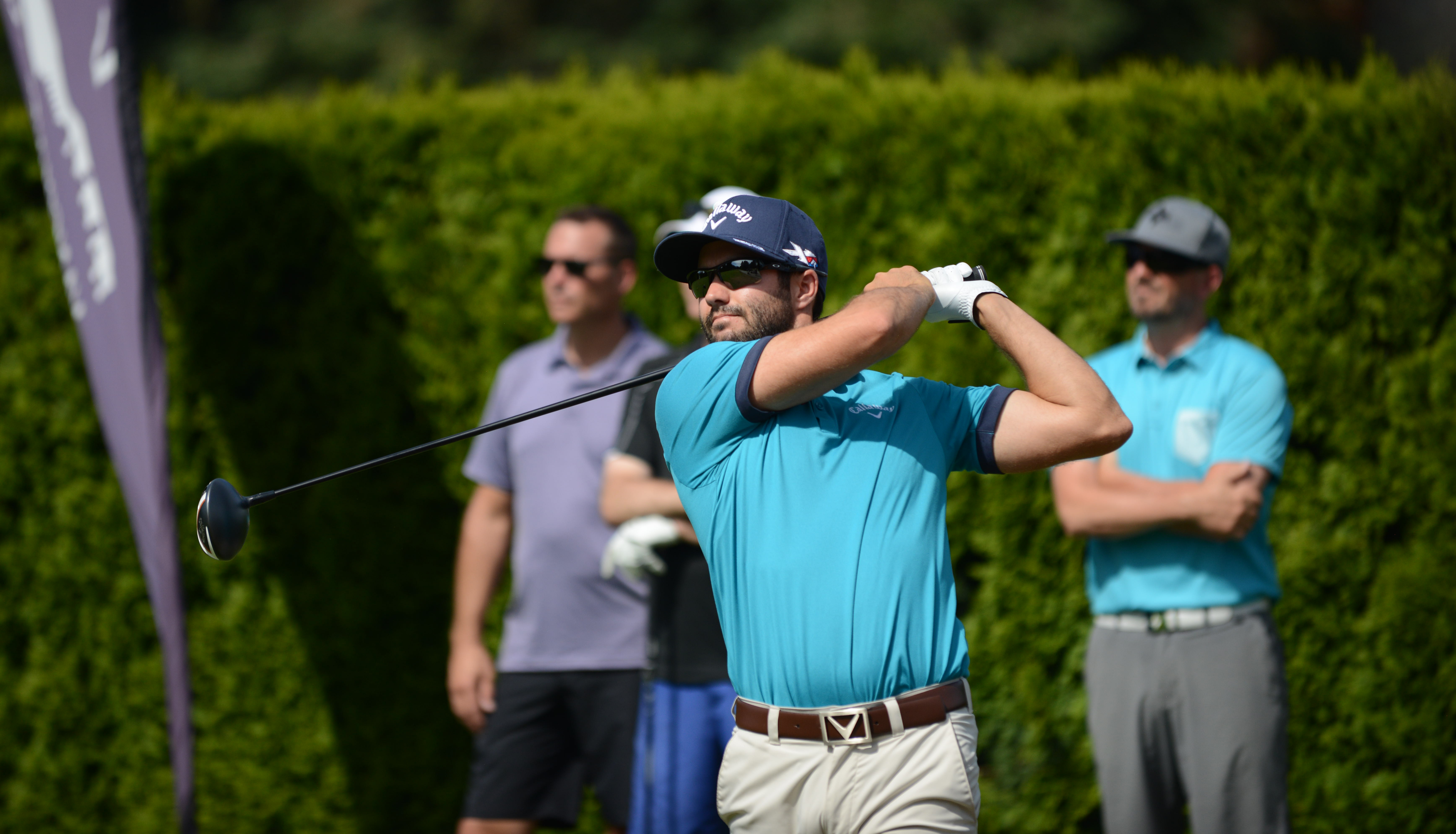
Hadwin in 2015.

On 9 March 2014, Hadwin won his first career Web.com Tour event at the Chile Classic. The win earned him US$117,000 and moved him to first place on the money list. He became the 13th Canadian to win on the Web.com Tour. On 7 September 2014, Hadwin won for a second time on the Web.com Tour, when he took home a playoff win at the Chiquita Classic. Hadwin earned his PGA Tour card for the 2014–15 season by topping the combined regular season and Web.com Tour Finals money list.

=== PGA Tour ===
On 21 January 2017, Hadwin shot a 59 (−13) in the third round of the CareerBuilder Challenge at La Quinta Country Club in La Quinta, California. He finished as the runner-up, and was the last player (as of the end of 2018) to shoot a round of 13-under, which is regarded as the lowest score in relation to par on the PGA Tour. On 12 March 2017, Hadwin won his first career PGA Tour tournament at the Valspar Championship, earning a prize of $1,134,000.
At the end of the season, Hadwin played in the 2017 Presidents Cup.

Hole	1	2	3	4	5	6	7	8	9	Out	10	11	12	13	14	15	16	17	18	In	Total
Par	4	4	3	4	5	5	3	4	4	36	4	5	3	5	4	3	4	4	4	36	72
Score	4	3	2	3	4	4	2	4	3	29	4	4	2	4	3	2	4	3	4	30	59

Hadwin had three top-10 finishes at the start of the year: T-3 at the CareerBuilder Challenge, T-6 at the Genesis Open, and T-9 at the WGC-Mexico Championship.

In December 2019, Hadwin played on the International team at the 2019 Presidents Cup at Royal Melbourne Golf Club in Australia. The U.S. team won 16–14. Hadwin went 1–1–1 including a half in his Sunday singles match against Bryson DeChambeau.

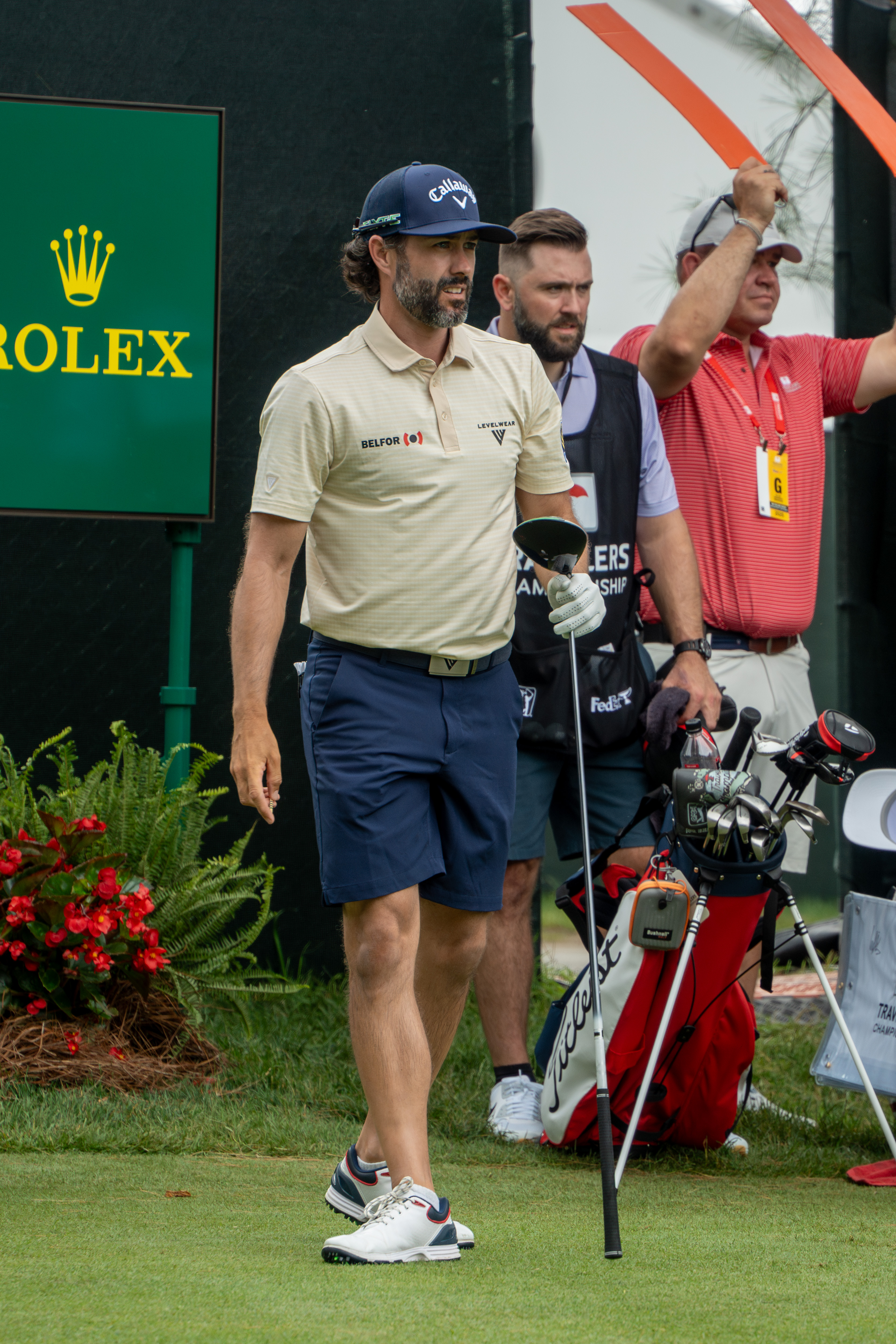
Adam Hadwin at the 2025 Travelers Championship

In June 2022, Hadwin led the U.S. Open after the first round and finished T-7.

On 11 June, Hadwin went viral when he was tackled by security at the RBC Canadian Open. Hadwin was not recognized as he entered the green and attempted to spray champagne on fellow Canadian golfer Nick Taylor after Taylor became the first Canadian to win the Canadian Open since Pat Fletcher in 1954.

In July, Hadwin was tied for the lead of the Rocket Mortgage Classic after 72 holes. Rickie Fowler ultimately won the tournament in a playoff over Collin Morikawa and Hadwin.

== Personal life ==
Hadwin lives in Abbotsford, British Columbia.

== Professional wins (12) ==
=== PGA Tour wins (1) ===
No.	Date	Tournament	Winning score	To par	Margin of victory	Runner-up
1	12 Mar 2017	Valspar Championship	68-64-67-71=270	−14	1 stroke	(United States) Patrick Cantlay

PGA Tour playoff record (0–1)

No.	Year	Tournament	Opponents	Result
1	2023	Rocket Mortgage Classic	(United States) Rickie Fowler, (United States) Collin Morikawa	Fowler won with birdie on first extra hole

=== Web.com Tour wins (2) ===
Legend
Finals events (1)
Other Web.com Tour (1)

No.	Date	Tournament	Winning score	To par	Margin of victory	Runner-up
1	9 Mar 2014	Chile Classic	67-69-67-69=272	−16	1 stroke	(Australia) Alistair Presnell
2	7 Sep 2014	Chiquita Classic	63-72-67-68=270	−18	2 strokes	(United States) John Peterson

=== Canadian Tour wins (2) ===
No.	Date	Tournament	Winning score	To par	Margin of victory	Runner(s)-up
1	7 Nov 2010	Desert Dunes Classic	63-67-69-70=269	−19	Playoff	(Canada) Richard T. Lee
2	27 Mar 2011	Pacific Colombia Tour Championship^{1}	66-66-62-69=263	−25	6 strokes	(Chile) Benjamín Alvarado, (Argentina) Tomas Argonz

^{1}Co-sanctioned by the Tour de las Américas

=== Vancouver Golf Tour wins (6) ===
- 2009 Ledgeview Open, Golden Ear's Open, Johnston Meier Insurance Open, RBC Invitational Pro-am
- 2010 Vancouver City Open
- 2011 Vancouver City Open
- 2016 Vancouver City Open

=== Gateway Tour wins (1) ===
- 2009 Desert Winter Sponsorship Event

== Results in major championships ==
Results not in chronological order in 2020.

Tournament	2011	2012	2013	2014	2015	2016	2017	2018
Masters Tournament							T36	T24
U.S. Open	T39		CUT				T60	CUT
The Open Championship							CUT	T35
PGA Championship							CUT	CUT

Tournament	2019	2020	2021	2022	2023	2024	2025
Masters Tournament		CUT				T53	
PGA Championship	T29	T58	T64	T71	T40	T60	CUT
U.S. Open		54	T40	T7	59	CUT	
The Open Championship	T57	NT	CUT			CUT	

Top 10
Did not play

CUT = missed the half-way cut
"T" = tied
NT = no tournament due to COVID-19 pandemic

=== Summary ===
Tournament	Wins	2nd	3rd	Top-5	Top-10	Top-25	Events	Cuts made
Masters Tournament	0	0	0	0	0	1	4	3
PGA Championship	0	0	0	0	0	0	9	6
U.S. Open	0	0	0	0	1	1	9	6
The Open Championship	0	0	0	0	0	0	5	2
Totals	0	0	0	0	1	2	27	17

- Most consecutive cuts made – 6 (2022 PGA – 2024 PGA)
- Longest streak of top-10s – 1 (once)

== Results in The Players Championship ==
Tournament	2015	2016	2017	2018	2019
The Players Championship	CUT	T39	T30	T57	CUT

Tournament	2020	2021	2022	2023	2024	2025
The Players Championship	C	T22	T9	T13	CUT	CUT

Top 10

CUT = missed the halfway cut
"T" indicates a tie for a place
C = Canceled after the first round due to the COVID-19 pandemic

== Results in World Golf Championships ==
Tournament	2017	2018	2019	2020	2021	2022	2023
Championship		T9					
Match Play		T17		NT^{1}			T31
Invitational	T5			T72			
Champions	T65	T30	T46	NT^{1}	NT^{1}	NT^{1}	

^{1}Cancelled due to COVID-19 pandemic

Top 10
Did not play

NT = No tournament
"T" = Tied
Note that the Championship and Invitational were discontinued from 2022. The Champions was discontinued from 2023.

== PGA Tour career summary ==
Season	Starts	Cuts made	Wins (majors)	2nd	3rd	Top-10	Top-25	Earnings ($)	Money list rank
2010	1	1	0	0	0	0	0	19,890	n/a
2011	5	5	0	0	0	2	2	440,752	n/a
2012	1	0	0	0	0	0	0	0	n/a
2013	3	1	0	0	0	0	0	0	n/a
2014	1	1	0	0	0	0	0	13,034	n/a
2015	30	18	0	0	0	3	7	937,611	110
2016	27	20	0	0	0	2	6	1,067,809	79
2017	28	21	1	1	0	5	10	3,455,012	19
2018	25	22	0	0	1	3	10	1,932,488	61
2019	24	19	0	1	0	5	7	2,039,012	53
2020	17	15	0	1	0	3	3	1,710,808	50
Career*	162	123	1	3	1	23	45	11,616,417	16

* As of the 2020 season

== Team appearances ==
Professional

- World Cup (representing Canada): 2016, 2018
- Presidents Cup (representing the International team): 2017, 2019

== See also ==
- 2014 Web.com Tour Finals graduates
- Lowest rounds of golf
