= List of albatrosses in notable tournaments =

This article lists albatrosses that have been scored in important golf tournaments. An albatross, also called a double eagle, is a score of three-under-par on a single hole. This is most commonly achieved with two shots on a par-5, but can be done with a hole-in-one on a par-4.

== Major championships ==
This is a list of albatrosses scored in men's major championships.

Player	Tournament	Course	Date	Round	Hole	Par	Score	Ref
Gene Sarazen	Masters Tournament	Augusta National	Apr 18, 1935	4	15	5	2	
Bruce Devlin	Masters Tournament	Augusta National	Apr 6, 1967	1	8	5	2	
Jeff Maggert	Masters Tournament	Augusta National	Apr 10, 1994	4	13	5	2	
Louis Oosthuizen	Masters Tournament	Augusta National	Apr 8, 2012	4	2	5	2	
Chen Tze-chung	U.S. Open	Oakland Hills	Jun 13, 1985	1	2	5	2	
Shaun Micheel	U.S. Open	Pebble Beach	Jun 20, 2010	4	6	5	2	
Nick Watney	U.S. Open	Olympic Club	Jun 14, 2012	1	17	5	2	
Patrick Reed	U.S. Open	Oakmont CC	Jun 12, 2025	1	4	5	2	
Young Tom Morris	The Open Championship	Prestwick	Sep 15, 1870	1	1	6	3	
Johnny Miller	The Open Championship	Muirfield	Jul 9, 1972	2	5	5	2	
Bill Rogers	The Open Championship	Royal Birkdale	Jul 14, 1983	1	17	5	2	
Manny Zerman	The Open Championship	St Andrews	Jul 21, 2000	2	5	5	2	
Jeff Maggert	The Open Championship	Royal Lytham	Jul 19, 2001	1	6	5	2	
Greg Owen	The Open Championship	Royal Lytham	Jul 21, 2001	3	11	5	2	
Gary Evans	The Open Championship	Royal Troon	Jul 15, 2004	1	4	5	2	
Paul Lawrie	The Open Championship	Turnberry, Ailsa	Jul 19, 2009	4	7	5	2	
Darrell Kestner	PGA Championship	Inverness Club	Aug 12, 1993	1	13	5	2	
Per-Ulrik Johansson	PGA Championship	Riviera CC	Aug 11, 1995	2	11	5	2	
Joey Sindelar	PGA Championship	Medinah CC	Aug 19, 2006	3	5	5	2	

== World Golf Championships ==
This is a list of albatrosses scored in World Golf Championships events.

Player	Tournament	Course	Date	Round	Hole	Par	Score	Ref
Ernie Els	WGC-NEC Invitational	Firestone Country Club	Aug 27, 2000	4	2	5	2	
Pádraig Harrington	WGC-HSBC Champions	Sheshan Golf Club	Nov 6, 2010	3	14	5	2	

== The Players Championship ==
This is a list of albatrosses scored in The Players Championship.

Player	Tournament	Course	Date	Round	Hole	Par	Score	Ref
Hunter Mahan	The Players Championship	TPC Sawgrass	Apr 11, 2007	2	11	5	2	
Peter Lonard	The Players Championship	TPC Sawgrass	Apr 12, 2007	3	2	5	2	
Rafa Cabrera-Bello	The Players Championship	TPC Sawgrass	May 14, 2017	4	16	5	2	
Brooks Koepka	The Players Championship	TPC Sawgrass	May 13, 2018	4	16	5	2	
Harris English	The Players Championship	TPC Sawgrass	Mar 14, 2019	1	11	5	2	
Russell Henley	The Players Championship	TPC Sawgrass	Mar 14, 2022	4	11	5	2	

== BMW PGA Championship ==
This is a list of albatrosses scored in the BMW PGA Championship.

Player	Tournament	Course	Date	Round	Hole	Par	Score	Ref
Pierre Fulke	Volvo PGA Championship	Wentworth Club	May 28, 1994	2	12	5	2	
Miguel Ángel Jiménez	BMW PGA Championship	Wentworth Club	May 24, 2009	4	4	5	2	
Tommy Fleetwood	BMW PGA Championship	Wentworth Club	May 23, 2015	3	4	5	2	
Ross Fisher	BMW PGA Championship	Wentworth Club	Sep 21, 2019	3	18	5	2	

== Women's major golf championships ==
This is a list of albatrosses scored in women's major golf championships.

Player	Tournament	Course	Date	Round	Hole	Par	Score	Ref
Dawn Coe-Jones	du Maurier Classic	London Hunt Club	Aug 26, 1993	1	4	5	2	
Åsa Gottmo	Women's British Open	Turnberry	Aug 11, 2002	4	7	5	2	
Karen Stupples	Women's British Open	Sunningdale Golf Club	Aug 1, 2004	4	2	5	2	
Vikki Laing	Women's British Open	Royal Birkdale Golf Club	Jul 11, 2014	2	17	5	2	
Liu Yan	Chevron Championship	Club at Carlton Woods	Apr 25, 2025	2	8	5	2	

Sandra Post scored an albatross in the 1978 du Maurier Classic, the year before it became a major. Sophie Gustafson scored an albatross in the 1999 Women's British Open, two years before it became a major.

== Par-4 hole-in-one ==
This is a list of those hitting a hole-in-one on a par-4 in professional tournament play.

Player	Tournament	Course	Tour	Date	Round	Hole	Ref
John Hudson	Martini International	Royal Norwich Golf Club		Jun 11, 1971	2	12	
Tsuneyuki Nakajima	The Crowns	Nagoya Golf Club, Wago Course	Japan Golf Tour	May 1, 1998	2	1	
Andrew Magee	Phoenix Open	TPC of Scottsdale	PGA Tour	Jan 25, 2001	1	17	
Chip Beck	Omaha Classic	The Champions Club	Nationwide Tour	Aug 7, 2003	1	9	
Steven Jeffress	Michael Hill New Zealand Open	The Hills	European Tour	Dec 1, 2007	3	15	
Richard Johnson	Michael Hill New Zealand Open	The Hills	PGA Tour of Australasia; Nationwide Tour	Mar 15, 2009	4	15	
Rahil Gangjee	Mylan Classic	South Pointe Golf Club	Nationwide Tour	Sep 4, 2011	4	15	
Rob Opperheim	Web.com Tour Championship	TPC Craig Ranch	Web.com Tour	Aug 31, 2012	4	14	
Javier Colomo	AfrAsia Bank Mauritius Open	Heritage Golf Club	European Tour; Sunshine Tour; Asian Tour	May 8, 2015	2	9	
Jang Ha-na	Pure Silk-Bahamas LPGA Classic	Ocean Club	LPGA Tour	Jan 30, 2016	3	8	
Minjee Lee	Kia Classic	Aviara Golf Club	LPGA Tour	Mar 26, 2016	3	16	
Moon Kyong-jun	Kenya Savannah Classic	Karen Country Club	European Tour	Mar 24, 2021	2	7	
Vincent Norrman	BMW International Open	Golfclub München Eichenried	European Tour	Jun 26, 2021	3	16	
Luna Sobrón	Florida's Natural Charity Classic	Country Club of Winter Haven	Epson Tour	Mar 6, 2022	3	5	
Davis Shore	Windsor Championship	Ambassador Golf Club	PGA Tour Canada	Aug 4, 2023	2	15	
Timmy Crawford	The Ascendant	TPC Colorado	Korn Ferry Tour	Jul 13, 2024	3	3	
Ross Steelman	Evans Scholars Invitational	The Glen Club	Korn Ferry Tour	Jul 26, 2026	4	15	
