= Pontus Nyholm =

Swedish professional golfer (born 1998)

Personal information
- Full name: Lars Pontus Nyholm
- Nationality: Sweden
- Born: 10 February 1998 (age 28) Gävle, Sweden
- Height: 6 ft 3 in (191 cm)
- Weight: 215 lb (98 kg)

Career
- Sport: Golf
- College: Campbell University
- Turned professional: 2021
- Current tour: PGA Tour
- Former tour: Korn Ferry Tour
- Professional wins: 3

Number of wins by tour
- Korn Ferry Tour: 1
- Other: 2

Achievements and awards
- Big South Freshman of the Year: 2018
- Big South Golfer of the Year: 2021
- Skandia Tour Order of Merit: 2015
- PGA of Sweden Future Fund Award: 2022

Lars Pontus Nyholm (born 10 February 1998) is a Swedish professional golfer and PGA Tour player. He won the 2025 Visit Knoxville Open on the Korn Ferry Tour. As an amateur, he won the 2016 Jacques Léglise Trophy and the 2019 European Amateur Team Championship.

== Amateur career ==
Nyholm grew up in Gävle, where his father is a superintendent at the local golf course, and his father took him golfing as soon as he could walk. His swing coach is Kasper Hedblom, son of three-time European Tour winner Peter Hedblom.

As a junior, Nyholm won the 2015 Order of Merit on the Skandia Tour, an under-21 circuit in Sweden, and was runner-up in the 2015 Swedish Junior Matchplay Championship. In 2016, he won the tournament, and advanced to the round of 16 in the Boys Amateur Championship.

Nyholm appeared for the National Team at the Junior Golf World Cup in Japan and European Boys' Team Championship in 2016, and was a member of the winning Continental European Team in the Jacques Léglise Trophy against Great Britain and Ireland. He was part of the Swedish team, together with Albin Bergström, Vincent Norrman, Christoffer Pålsson, David Nyfjäll and Ludvig Åberg, winning the 2019 European Amateur Team Championship. He defeated Alex Fitzpatrick as Sweden triumphed over England in the final.

Nyholm accepted a scholarship to Campbell University and played with the Campbell Fighting Camels golf team 2017–2021. He was 2018 Big South Conference Freshman of the Year and qualified individually for the NCAA Championship. In 2021, he was Golfer of the Year after three first-place finishes and leading Campbell to a second-straight league title while rating first in stroke average (70.08).

He graduated in May 2021 as a business administration major, with the most top-10 individual finishes (21) and the lowest career stroke average (71.17) in school history. He was rated as high as No. 13 by Golfstat, No. 15 in PGA Tour University and No. 46 in World Amateur Golf Rankings. Nyholm earned a sponsor's exemption to Rex Hospital Open on the Korn Ferry Tour where he made the cut. He crowned his college career with a selection to play in the 2021 Arnold Palmer Cup with the international team.

== Professional career ==
Nyholm turned professional after the European Amateur Team Championship in July 2021. He made a few starts on the Challenge Tour where he was tied 6th at the Finnish Challenge and tied 7th at the British Challenge.

He joined the 2022 Korn Ferry Tour after finishing tied 29th at the Final Stage of Q-School. In his rookie season, Nyholm was runner-up at the Veritex Bank Championship after matching the 18-hole tournament scoring record with a 9-under 62, totaling a 20-under 264 to finish two shots behind the champion. He finished 50th in the season rankings.

In 2023, Nyholm held or shared the lead ahead of the final round twice, at the Astara Chile Classic where he finished tied 18th, and the Simmons Bank Open where he finished tied 5th.

In 2025, his fourth consecutive season on the Korn Ferry Tour, Nyholm won the Visit Knoxville Open and earned PGA Tour membership for the first time by finishing among the top 20 players in the season-long Korn Ferry Tour points list. On the 2026 PGA Tour he made his first cut at the Cognizant Classic, where he tied for 13th.

== Amateur wins ==
- 2016 Swedish Junior Matchplay Championship
- 2019 Intercollegiate at Innisbrook
- 2020 Golfweek True Blue Amateur
- 2021 Southern Invitational, Golfweek Spring Invitational, Stitch Intercollegiate

== Professional wins (3) ==
=== Korn Ferry Tour wins (1) ===
No.	Date	Tournament	Winning score	Margin of victory	Runner-up
1	May 25, 2025	Visit Knoxville Open	−19 (65-66-68-66=265)	Playoff	(United States) Johnny Keefer

Korn Ferry Tour playoff record (1–0)

No.	Year	Tournament	Opponent	Result
1	2025	Visit Knoxville Open	(United States) Johnny Keefer	Won with eagle on first extra hole

=== Swedish Future Series wins (2) ===
No.	Date	Tournament	Winning score	Margin of victory	Runner-up
1	4 Aug 2018	Bilmetro Gefle Open (as an amateur)	−10 (66-68=134)	4 strokes	(Sweden) Oskar Bergman
2	7 Aug 2018	Siljan Open (as an amateur)	−13 (63-68=131)	2 strokes	(Sweden) William Nygård

== Team appearances ==
Amateur

- Junior Golf World Cup (representing Sweden): 2016
- Jacques Léglise Trophy (representing Continental Europe): 2016 (winners)
- European Boys' Team Championship (representing Sweden): 2016
- European Amateur Team Championship (representing Sweden): 2018, 2019 (winners), 2021
- Arnold Palmer Cup (representing the International Team): 2021

== See also ==
- 2025 Korn Ferry Tour graduates
