= 2026 Korn Ferry Tour graduates =

This is a list of golfers who graduated from the Korn Ferry Tour in 2026. The top 20 players on the 2026 Korn Ferry Tour points list earned PGA Tour cards for 2027.

| | Player | Points rank | Points |
|---|---|---|---|
| (United States) | Ross Steelman* | 1 | 2,221 |
| (Scotland) | Sandy Scott* | 2 | 2,191 |
| (United States) | Ian Holt* | 3 | 1,618 |
| (United States) | Alistair Docherty* | 4 | 1,580 |
| (Mexico) | Álvaro Ortiz* | 5 | 1,533 |
| (United States) | Austin Hitt* | 6 | 1,491 |
| (United States) | Cole Sherwood* | 7 | 1,483 |
| (United States) | Doc Redman | 8 | 1,466 |
| (United States) | Blades Brown | 9 | 1,402 |
| (United States) | Tommy Morrison* | 10 | 1,289 |
| (United States) | Cooper Dossey* | 11 | 1,200 |
| (United States) | Hunter Eichhorn* | 12 | 1,190 |
| (United States) | Dylan Menante* | 13 | 1,183 |
| (United States) | Michael Johnson* | 14 | 1,120 |
| (France) | Jérémy Gandon* | 15 | 1,095 |
| (United States) | Taylor Dickson | 16 | 1,058 |
| (United States) | Ian Gilligan* | 17 | 993 |
| (United States) | Davis Shore* | 18 | 989 |
| (United States) | Carson Young | 19 | 939 |
| (United States) | Davis Lamb* | 20 | 938 |

*PGA Tour rookie in 2027
