= Ross Steelman =

American professional golfer (born 2000)

Personal information
- Full name: Ross David Steelman
- Nationality: United States
- Born: November 5, 2000 (age 26) Columbia, Missouri, U.S.
- Height: 6 ft 5 in (196 cm)
- Weight: 180 lb (82 kg)

Career
- Sport: Golf
- College: University of Missouri; Georgia Tech
- Turned professional: 2023
- Current tour: PGA Tour
- Former tour: Korn Ferry Tour
- Professional wins: 2
- Highest ranking: 72 (October 4, 2026) (as of November 8, 2026)

Number of wins by tour
- Korn Ferry Tour: 2

Achievements and awards
- Korn Ferry Tour points list winner: 2026
- Korn Ferry Tour Player of the Year: 2026

Ross David Steelman (born November 5, 2000) is an American professional golfer who plays on the PGA Tour. After playing collegiately for the University of Missouri and Georgia Tech, he turned professional in 2023 and received Korn Ferry Tour status through the PGA Tour University rankings. Steelman won twice on the Korn Ferry Tour in 2026 to secure promotion to the PGA Tour.

== Early life and amateur career ==
Steelman was born in Columbia, Missouri on November 5, 2000, to Kristin (née Duff) and Jim Steelman. Kristin worked at an urgent care clinic and Jim was a teacher at Grant Elementary. They introduced him to golf through putt-putt at age two and gave him a set of plastic clubs, which he wore out. Steelman's grandfather, Ross Duff, cut down a set of real clubs for him to use when he was three. Steelman played in his first tournament, the Coca-Cola Junior Classic, at age eight. During the tournament, he met Jake Poe, who became his instructor. Steelman made quick progress; he broke 70 for the first time at age 11, shooting 2-under 68 at A.L. Gustin.

Growing up, Steelman played golf at Perche Creek, a par-3 course near Interstate 70. Alongside golf, he played baseball and basketball. He said in 2015 that he was inspired by Jordan Spieth. In 2017, Steelman won the Richard Poe Invitational. Aged 16, he was the youngest champion in the 58-year history of the tournament. He attended Rock Bridge High School in Columbia, where he was a three-time all-state selection. Steelman won the 2018 Missouri Class 4 state championship with a record score of 8-under 136. He also won the Missouri Junior Match Play Championship. He signed his National Letter of Intent in November 2018 to play collegiate golf at the University of Missouri. At the time, he was ranked No. 48 in the national junior rankings for the 2019 class.

Steelman broke his wrist prior to his senior year of high school by hitting a tree root while playing a shot. He graduated early from high school and started at the University of Missouri in January 2019, where he reaggravated the injury and redshirted the season. As a redshirt freshman for the Missouri Tigers, Steelman won his first individual collegiate title at the Prairie Club Invitational in September 2019. He shot 9-under 210 for a six-shot victory. Steelman had a 72.48 stroke average for the 2019–20 season, which was shortened due to the COVID-19 pandemic. He said in 2021 that the suspension of the golf schedule due to COVID allowed him to fully heal his wrist injury.

As a redshirt sophomore, Steelman won the Missouri Tiger Intercollegiate in April 2021, shooting 16-under 200. He ended the season with a 70.24 stroke average and was named as a second-team All-SEC selection. Steelman transferred to Georgia Tech in May 2021. He was an economics major. Steelman's coaches at Missouri had recommended that he transfer to a top-10 program to aid his development.

Playing for the Georgia Tech Yellow Jackets, Steelman had six top-10 finishes across 11 starts in the 2021–22 season, including a runner-up finish at the NCAA Columbus Regional, where he shot 6-under 207 to finish one shot behind Eugenio Chacarra. He averaged 71.82 for the season. As a redshirt senior in 2022–23, Steelman finished tied-second individually at the 2023 NCAA Division I men's golf championship. He had considered returning to college for a fifth year, but decided that the NCAA championship would be his final amateur event. Steelman's stroke average for the season was 69.50, the third-best in program history behind Christo Lamprecht (69.44) and Bryce Molder (69.43). He was an All-ACC selection and was named as a first-team All-American by Golfweek.

== Professional career ==
Steelman earned status on the Korn Ferry Tour by finishing fourth in the PGA Tour University rankings for 2023. He made his professional debut at the Blue Cross and Blue Shield of Kansas Wichita Open in June 2023, where he shot 11-under 269 to finish tied-43rd. Steelman finished 56th on the 2024 Korn Ferry Tour rankings. He advanced through a Monday qualifier for the CJ Cup Byron Nelson on the PGA Tour in May 2025, where he finished tied-25th. At The Ascendant in July 2025, Steelman held a three-stroke lead after 54 holes. He faltered with a 3-over 75 in the final round to finish tied-fourth, four strokes behind the winner Neal Shipley. Steelman finished 32nd in the 2025 Korn Ferry Tour rankings.

In May 2026, Steelman shot a final-round 66 to force a playoff against 54-hole leader Álvaro Ortiz at the UNC Health Championship. Ortiz won with a birdie on the first playoff hole. At The Blue Championship in July 2026, Steelman shot a final-round 68 to claim his first professional victory. He totaled 22-under 266 to tie the tournament scoring record and defeat runner-up Tommy Morrison by one stroke. Two weeks later, Steelman finished third at the Evans Scholars Invitational. During his final round, he made a hole in one on the 352-yard (322 m), par-4 15th hole at The Glen Club.

Steelman won his second Korn Ferry Tour title at the Albertsons Boise Open in August 2026. He opened with a 65 and followed with three consecutive rounds of 64 to total 27-under 257. The victory moved him to first in the Korn Ferry Tour rankings and mathematically secured his promotion to the PGA Tour for the 2027 season. It also vaulted him to 85th in the Official World Golf Ranking, marking the first time he had reached the top 100.

== Personal life ==
Steelman's aunt and uncle, Susan and Wayne Kreklow, coached the Missouri Tigers women's volleyball program from 2000 to 2018. Steelman drinks ginger ale on the night before competitive rounds, following the lead of Ben Hogan who believed it enhanced feel in the fingers.

== Amateur wins ==
- 2016 Lockton Kansas City Junior
- 2018 Missouri Junior Match Play Championship
- 2019 Prairie Club Invitational
- 2021 Missouri Tiger Intercollegiate

== Professional wins (2) ==
=== Korn Ferry Tour wins (2) ===
No.	Date	Tournament	Winning score	Margin of victory	Runner(s)-up
1	Jul 12, 2026	The Blue Championship	−22 (66-67-65-68=266)	1 stroke	(United States) Tommy Morrison
2	Aug 16, 2026	Albertsons Boise Open	−27 (65-64-64-64=257)	3 strokes	(United States) Robby Shelton, (United States) Davis Shore

Korn Ferry Tour playoff record (0–1)

No.	Year	Tournament	Opponent	Result
1	2026	UNC Health Championship	(Mexico) Álvaro Ortiz	Lost to birdie on first extra hole

== See also ==
- 2026 Korn Ferry Tour graduates
