= Veritex Bank Championship =

Tournament information
- Location: Arlington, Texas
- Established: 2020
- Course: Texas Rangers Golf Club
- Par: 71
- Length: 6,987 yards (6,389 m)
- Tour: Korn Ferry Tour
- Format: Stroke play
- Prize fund: $1,000,000
- Final year: 2025

Tournament record score
- Aggregate: 253 Tim Widing (2024)
- To par: −31 as above

Final champion
- (United States) Johnny Keefer

Location map
- Location in the United States Location in Texas

The Veritex Bank Championship was a golf tournament on the Korn Ferry Tour. It was first played in April 2021 at Texas Rangers Golf Club in Arlington, Texas; it had been scheduled to be played in 2020, but was canceled due to the COVID-19 pandemic.

In 2022, Tyson Alexander became the first player in Korn Ferry Tour history to successfully defend a title.

== Winners ==
Year	Winner	Score	To par	Margin of victory	Runner(s)-up
2025	(United States) Johnny Keefer	254	−30	3 strokes	(United States) Tyson Alexander (United States) Blades Brown (United States) Joshua Creel (United States) Zach James (United States) Julian Suri
2024	(Sweden) Tim Widing	253	−31	4 strokes	(Canada) Myles Creighton
2023	(United States) Spencer Levin	264	−20	1 stroke	(Australia) Brett Drewitt
2022	(United States) Tyson Alexander (2)	262	−22	2 strokes	(South Korea) An Byeong-hun (Sweden) Pontus Nyholm
2021	(United States) Tyson Alexander	261	−23	1 stroke	(United States) Theo Humphrey
2020	Canceled due to the COVID-19 pandemic				
