= Utah Championship =

Golf tournament

Coordinates: 41.002°N 111.920°W

Tournament information
- Location: Ogden, Utah
- Established: 2025
- Course: Ogden Golf & Country Club
- Par: 70
- Length: 7,097 yards (6,489 m)
- Tour: Korn Ferry Tour
- Format: Stroke play
- Prize fund: US$1,000,000
- Month played: August

Tournament record score
- Aggregate: 259 Karl Vilips (2024); 259 Mason Andersen (2026); 259 Cole Hammer (2026); 259 Derek Hitchner (2026); 259 Tommy Morrison (2026); 259 Travis Trace (2026)
- To par: −25 Karl Vilips (2024)

Current champion
- (United States) Derek Hitchner

Location map
- Location in the United States Location in Utah

The Utah Championship is a professional golf tournament on the Korn Ferry Tour, played at Ogden Country Club in Ogden, Utah.

One of the original tournaments of the 1990 Ben Hogan Tour as the Utah Classic, the tournament has been played every year but two (1997–1998). The first seven (1990–1996) were played in Provo at Riverside Country Club and the next sixteen (1999–2014) at Willow Creek in Sandy.

Formerly played in early September, the tournament moved to late July in 2011 and to mid-July in 2012. It moved to Thanksgiving Point Golf Club in Lehi in 2015, a few miles north of Utah Lake and along the Jordan River. In 2017, the tournament moved north to Oakridge Country Club in Farmington, between Salt Lake City and Ogden; its average elevation is slightly under 4,300 feet (1,310 m) above sea level. In 2025, the tournament was moved to Ogden, Utah to Ogden Golf & Country Club.

Two major champions have won this event: John Daly won $20,000 in the inaugural edition in 1990, and Zach Johnson won $81,000 in 2003. The purse in 2018 was $700,000, with a winner's share of $126,000.

== Winners ==
Year	Winner	Score	To par	Margin of victory	Runner(s)-up
Utah Championship
2026	(United States) Derek Hitchner	259	−21	Playoff	(United States) Mason Andersen (United States) Cole Hammer (United States) Tommy Morrison (United States) Travis Trace
2025	(United States) Julian Suri	262	−18	2 strokes	(South Africa) Barend Botha (United States) Trace Crowe (Japan) Kensei Hirata (United States) Spencer Levin (United States) Taylor Montgomery
2024	(Australia) Karl Vilips	259	−25	2 strokes	(United States) Matt McCarty (United States) Joe Weiler
2023	(Canada) Roger Sloan	260	−24	1 stroke	(United States) Chris Petefish
2022	(United States) Andrew Kozan	263	−21	1 stroke	(United States) Patrick Fishburn (United States) Justin Suh (United States) Ashton van Horne
2021	(United States) Joshua Creel	260	−24	2 strokes	(United States) Hayden Buckley (United States) Taylor Montgomery (United States) Peter Uihlein
2020	(United States) Kyle Jones	264	−20	Playoff	(United States) Paul Haley II (United States) Daniel Summerhays
2019	(Norway) Kristoffer Ventura	270	−14	Playoff	(United States) Joshua Creel
2018	(United States) Cameron Champ	260	−24	1 stroke	(United States) Steven Ihm
2017	(United States) Brice Garnett	263	−21	1 stroke	(Mexico) Abraham Ancer (United States) Austin Cook
2016	(United States) Nicholas Lindheim	269	−15	2 strokes	(United States) J. J. Spaun
2015	(United States) Patton Kizzire	269	−19	Playoff	(South Korea) Kang Sung-hoon
2014	(United States) Andres Gonzales	263	−21	4 strokes	(United States) Travis Bertoni (Australia) Adam Crawford (South Korea) Kang Sung-hoon
2013	(New Zealand) Steven Alker	262	−22	Playoff	(Australia) Ashley Hall
2012	(United States) Doug LaBelle II	269	−15	1 stroke	(United States) Scott Gutschewski (United States) James Hahn (United States) Michael Putnam (United States) Sam Saunders
2011	(United States) J. J. Killeen	262	−22	4 strokes	(United States) Jeff Gove
2010	(United States) Michael Putnam	266	−18	3 strokes	(New Zealand) Bradley Iles (Venezuela) Jhonattan Vegas
2009	(United States) Josh Teater	264	−20	4 strokes	(United States) Tyler Aldridge
2008	(United States) Brendon Todd	262	−22	6 strokes	(United States) Ryan Hietala (United States) Jeff Klauk (Australia) Won Joon Lee (Australia) Marc Leishman (United States) Brian Smock (United States) Kyle Thompson
Utah EnergySolutions Championship
2007	(United States) Franklin Langham	264	−20	2 strokes	(Wales) Richard Johnson
2006	(United States) Craig Kanada	272	−16	1 stroke	(Australia) Gavin Coles (United States) Ken Duke (United States) Bryce Molder (United States) Michael Putnam
Envirocare Utah Classic
2005	(United States) Garrett Willis	275	−13	1 stroke	(United States) Kris Cox (Australia) Mathew Goggin (United States) Brian Henninger
2004	(United States) Brett Wetterich	272	−16	1 stroke	(Japan) Ryuji Imada (United States) Franklin Langham
2003	(United States) Zach Johnson	267	−21	1 stroke	(United States) Bobby Gage
Utah Classic
2002	(United States) Arron Oberholser	202 (Note: Shortened to 54 holes due to rain.)	−14	2 strokes	(United States) Doug Barron (United States) Brian Claar
Buy.com Utah Classic
2001	(United States) David Sutherland	272	−16	1 stroke	(United States) Danny Briggs
2000	(United States) Andy Morse	269	−19	2 strokes	(United States) John Riegger
Nike Utah Classic
1999	(United States) Carl Paulson	266	−22	6 strokes	(United States) Craig Bowden (South Africa) Marco Gortana
1997–98: No tournament
1996	(United States) Michael Christie	196	−20	4 strokes	(United States) R. W. Eaks
1995	(Canada) Glen Hnatiuk	203	−13	Playoff	(United States) Franklin Langham (United States) Harry Rudolph
1994	(United States) Chris Perry	205	−11	1 stroke	(United States) David Duval
1993	(United States) Sean Murphy	204	−12	Playoff	(United States) Curt Byrum (United States) Jim Carter (United States) Tommy Moore
Ben Hogan Utah Classic
1992	(Australia) Jeff Woodland	202	−14	3 strokes	(United States) David Jackson (United States) Brian Kamm
1991	(United States) Ted Tryba	202	−14	1 stroke	(United States) Webb Heintzelman
1990	(United States) John Daly	203	−13	1 stroke	(United States) R. W. Eaks
