= Zach Bauchou =

American professional golfer (born 1995)

Personal information
- Nationality: United States
- Born: December 28, 1995 (age 30) Forest, Virginia, U.S.
- Height: 6 ft 0 in (183 cm)
- Life partner: Victoria

Career
- Sport: Golf
- College: Oklahoma State University
- Turned professional: 2019
- Current tour: PGA Tour
- Former tours: Korn Ferry Tour; Asian Tour
- Professional wins: 1

Number of wins by tour
- Korn Ferry Tour: 1

Best results in major championships
- Masters Tournament: DNP
- PGA Championship: DNP
- U.S. Open: WD: 2025
- The Open Championship: DNP

Achievements and awards
- Big-12 Newcomer of the Year: 2016

Zachary Bauchou (born December 28, 1995) is an American professional golfer from Bedford County, Virginia who plays on the PGA Tour.

== Early life and amateur career ==
Bauchou was born and raised in Forest, Virginia, where he grew up playing golf with his father at London Downs Golf Club, a public course. Bauchou attended Liberty Christian Academy High School in Lynchburg, Virginia.

He was runner-up at the 2013 Junior Players Championship behind Austen Truslow, and at the 2016 Southern Amateur behind Jimmy Stanger. He won the Canadian Amateur Championship back-to-back in 2017 and 2018.

In 2014 he represented the U.S. team at the Junior Golf World Cup in Japan alongside Cameron Young, Tyler McDaniel and Austen Truslow, and he competed for the victorious U.S. squad at the 2018 Arnold Palmer Cup.

Bauchou attended Oklahoma State University from 2015 to 2019, overlapping with Wyndham Clark, Viktor Hovland, Matthew Wolff and Austin Eckroat. He was named 2016 Big-12 Newcomer of the Year, helped the Cowboys win the 2018 NCAA Championship, and tied for 8th at the 2019 NCAA Championship.

== Professional career ==
Bauchou turned professional in 2019 after graduating. He earned status on the Asian Tour for 2020, but it soon shut down due to the pandemic. When it resumed again in 2022, he recorded a best finish of tied 15th at the International Series Korea.

In 2023, he joined the Korn Ferry Tour, where he recorded two top-5 finishes. In 2024, he tied for 3rd at the NV5 Invitational. Bauchou claimed his first title at the 2025 Simmons Bank Open, and finished 11th in the season rankings to graduate to the PGA Tour for 2026.

In his rookie PGA Tour season, he recorded his first top-10 at the CJ Cup Byron Nelson, where he tied for 6th.

== Amateur wins ==
- 2014 Faldo Series Grand Final at The Greenbrier
- 2016 ORU Shootout
- 2017 Canadian Amateur Championship
- 2018 Canadian Amateur Championship

== Professional wins (1) ==
=== Korn Ferry Tour wins (1) ===
Legend
Finals events (1)
Other Korn Ferry Tour (0)

No.	Date	Tournament	Winning score	Margin of victory	Runner-up
1	Sep 14, 2025	Simmons Bank Open	−23 (65-64-64-64=257)	2 strokes	(United States) Austin Hitt

== Results in major championships ==
Tournament	2025
Masters Tournament	
PGA Championship	
U.S. Open	WD
The Open Championship	

Did not play

WD = withdrew

== U.S National team appearances ==
Amateur

- Junior Golf World Cup: 2014
- Arnold Palmer Cup: 2018 (winners)

== See also ==
- 2025 Korn Ferry Tour graduates
