= Austin Smotherman =

American professional golfer (born 1994)

Personal information
- Nationality: United States
- Born: May 19, 1994 (age 32) Loomis, California, U.S.
- Height: 5 ft 11 in (1.80 m)
- Weight: 155 lb (70 kg; 11.1 st)

Career
- Sport: Golf
- College: Southern Methodist University
- Turned professional: 2016
- Current tour: PGA Tour
- Former tours: Korn Ferry Tour; PGA Tour Latinoamérica
- Professional wins: 6
- Highest ranking: 54 (October 25, 2026) (as of October 25, 2026)

Number of wins by tour
- PGA Tour: 2
- Korn Ferry Tour: 3
- Other: 1

Best results in major championships
- Masters Tournament: DNP
- PGA Championship: CUT: 2026
- U.S. Open: DNP
- The Open Championship: DNP

Austin Smotherman (born May 19, 1994) is an American professional golfer who plays on the PGA Tour. He played collegiate golf at Southern Methodist University. Smotherman won the 2021 Simmons Bank Open on the Korn Ferry Tour.

== Career ==
Smotherman, a college teammate of Bryson DeChambeau at SMU, turned professional in 2016. Playing on the PGA Tour Latinoamérica, he won the 2018 Mexican Open and finished fourth in the tour's Order of Merit, which guaranteed partial status on the Web.com Tour in 2019. In 2020, he held the 36-hole lead at the TPC San Antonio Championship before finishing solo fourth. Smotherman earned his first Korn Ferry Tour victory at the 2021 Simmons Bank Open, going wire-to-wire and winning by three strokes.

Smotherman won twice on the PGA Tour in October 2026: at the Bank of Utah Championship on October 4 and three weeks later at the Butterfield Bermuda Championship.

== Professional wins (6) ==
=== PGA Tour wins (2) ===
No.	Date	Tournament	Winning score	To par	Margin of victory	Runner-up
1	Oct 4, 2026	Bank of Utah Championship	63-62-65-68=258	−26	2 strokes	(United States) Doug Ghim
2	Oct 26, 2026	Butterfield Bermuda Championship	65-66-66=197 (Note: Shortened to 54 holes due to weather.)	−16	Playoff	(Republic of Ireland) Séamus Power

PGA Tour playoff record (1–0)

No.	Year	Tournament	Opponent	Result
1	2026	Butterfield Bermuda Championship	(Republic of Ireland) Séamus Power	Won with par on third extra hole

=== Korn Ferry Tour wins (3) ===
No.	Date	Tournament	Winning score	To par	Margin of victory	Runner(s)-up
1	May 9, 2021	Simmons Bank Open	65-69-69-69=272	−16	3 strokes	(United States) Paul Haley II, (China) Yuan Yechun
2	Jun 8, 2025	BMW Charity Pro-Am	65-62-66-67=260	−25	3 strokes	(Denmark) Sebastian Cappelen, (United States) Pierceson Coody, (China) Yuan Yechun
3	Jun 29, 2025	Memorial Health Championship	65-63-68-63=259	−25	1 stroke	(Mexico) Álvaro Ortiz

=== PGA Tour Latinoamérica wins (1) ===
No.	Date	Tournament	Winning score	To par	Margin of victory	Runner-up
1	Mar 25, 2018	Abierto Mexicano de Golf	66-65-66-65=262	−18	4 strokes	(Mexico) Juan Pablo Hernández

== Results in major championships ==
Tournament	2026
Masters Tournament	
PGA Championship	CUT
U.S. Open	
The Open Championship	

Did not play

CUT = missed the half-way cut
T = tied

== Results in The Players Championship ==
Tournament	2023	2024	2025	2026
The Players Championship	T35			T13

Did not play

"T" indicates a tie for a place

== See also ==
- 2021 Korn Ferry Tour Finals graduates
- 2025 Korn Ferry Tour graduates
