= Johnny Keefer =

American professional golfer (born 2001)

Personal information
- Full name: John Henry Keefer IV
- Nationality: United States
- Born: January 11, 2001 (age 25) Baltimore, Maryland, U.S.
- Height: 5 ft 11 in (180 cm)

Career
- Sport: Golf
- College: Baylor University
- Turned professional: 2024
- Current tour: PGA Tour
- Former tours: PGA Tour Americas; Korn Ferry Tour
- Professional wins: 3
- Highest ranking: 45 (January 11, 2026) (as of October 25, 2026)

Number of wins by tour
- Korn Ferry Tour: 2
- Other: 1

Best results in major championships
- Masters Tournament: CUT: 2026
- PGA Championship: 79th: 2026
- U.S. Open: T39: 2026
- The Open Championship: T59: 2026

Achievements and awards
- PGA Tour Americas points list winner: 2024
- Korn Ferry Tour points list winner: 2025
- Korn Ferry Tour Player of the Year: 2025
- Korn Ferry Tour Rookie of the Year: 2025

John Henry Keefer IV (born January 11, 2001) is an American professional golfer who plays on the PGA Tour. After playing for Baylor University, he turned professional and finished first on the 2024 PGA Tour Americas points list, earning promotion to the Korn Ferry Tour. He topped the 2025 Korn Ferry Tour points list to secure status on the PGA Tour.

== Early life and amateur career ==
Keefer was born in Baltimore, Maryland, to Judy and John Keefer III. Judy moved to the United States from Hong Kong as a child. Both of Keefer's parents are engineers; they worked at Gilbane Building, a construction and real estate development firm. They often traveled as part of their work and Judy described Keefer as a "latchkey kid". Keefer has an elder sister, Amanda.

Keefer's father was a recreational golfer and introduced his son to the game as a child. The family moved to San Diego, California when Keefer was aged seven, and he began playing golf at The Farms Golf Club. They relocated to San Antonio, Texas when Keefer was 14 and he joined TPC San Antonio. Alongside golf, he played lacrosse until his senior year of high school. He originally intended to become a professional lacrosse player but switched focus to golf after the move to San Antonio. Keefer attended Lady Bird Johnson High School in San Antonio. In 2017, he won the AJGA Sergio and Angela Garcia Foundation Junior Championship and the TJGT Texas Junior Masters. He was No. 10 in the Golfweek rankings of the 2019 recruiting class and signed his National Letter of Intent in November 2018 with Baylor University.

Playing for the Baylor Bears from 2019 to 2024, Keefer was an All-Big 12 selection in 2022 and 2024, and qualified to represent the United States at the 2022 Arnold Palmer Cup. He won medalist honors twice, at the 2021 Rice Intercollegiate and 2023 Valero Texas Collegiate. He had a career stroke average of 71.45, which broke the Baylor program record previously held by Jimmy Walker (71.55). Keefer majored in accounting and became the first men's golfer in Big 12 Conference history to win back-to-back Scholar Athlete of the Year awards.

== Professional career ==
Keefer finished 25th in the 2023–24 PGA Tour University standings, which earned him status on PGA Tour Americas. In his 10 starts during the 2024 PGA Tour Americas season, he placed inside the top-10 nine times, including four runner-up finishes and a win at the CentrePort Canada Rail Park Manitoba Open. He set the record for lowest scoring average on PGA Tour Americas (66.00) and finished first in the points list, earning promotion to the Korn Ferry Tour in 2025. Keefer received an exemption into the Procore Championship in September 2024, which was his PGA Tour debut. He tied for 13th at 9-under 279.

In April 2025, Keefer shot a final-round 64 to total 30-under 254 and win the Veritex Bank Championship by three strokes. This was his first Korn Ferry Tour victory. He made his major championship debut at the 2025 PGA Championship in May, and made his first cut in a major championship at the 2025 U.S. Open in June, where he finished tied-61st. Keefer won his second Korn Ferry Tour title of the season at the NV5 Invitational in July, shooting 26-under 258 to break the tournament scoring record.

Keefer ended the 2025 Korn Ferry Tour season ranked first in the points list, securing full status on the PGA Tour in 2026. He had a scoring average of 67.95, breaking the Korn Ferry Tour record set by Luke Guthrie in 2012 (68.33). For his achievements, Keefer was named the Korn Ferry Tour Rookie of the Year and Korn Ferry Tour Player of the Year. He was the first to win both awards since Scottie Scheffler in 2019. After finishing tied-seventh in the PGA Tour's RSM Classic in November 2025, Keefer moved to 47th in the Official World Golf Ranking.

== Personal life ==
Keefer became engaged to his fiancée Hitomi Chilcutt in May 2025.

== Amateur wins ==
- 2018 Sergio and Angela Garcia Foundation Junior Championship

== Professional wins (3) ==
=== Korn Ferry Tour wins (2) ===
| No. | Date | Tournament | Winning score | Margin of victory | Runner(s)-up |
|---|---|---|---|---|---|
| 1 | Apr 27, 2025 | Veritex Bank Championship | −30 (63-61-66-64=254) | 3 strokes | (United States) Tyson Alexander, (United States) Blades Brown, (United States) Joshua Creel, (United States) Zach James, (United States) Julian Suri |
| 2 | Jul 27, 2025 | NV5 Invitational | −26 (65-63-61-69=258) | 2 strokes | (United States) Jeffrey Kang |

Korn Ferry Tour playoff record (0–1)

| No. | Year | Tournament | Opponent | Result |
|---|---|---|---|---|
| 1 | 2025 | Visit Knoxville Open | (Sweden) Pontus Nyholm | Lost to eagle on first extra hole |

=== PGA Tour Americas wins (1) ===
| No. | Date | Tournament | Winning score | Margin of victory | Runners-up |
|---|---|---|---|---|---|
| 1 | Aug 25, 2024 | CentrePort Canada Rail Park Manitoba Open | −26 (63-61-71-67=262) | 1 stroke | (Canada) Joey Savoie, (United States) Neal Shipley |

== Results in major championships ==
| Tournament | 2025 | 2026 |
|---|---|---|
| Masters Tournament | | CUT |
| PGA Championship | CUT | 79 |
| U.S. Open | T61 | T39 |
| The Open Championship | | T59 |

Did not play

CUT = missed the half-way cut
T = tied

== U.S. national team appearances ==
- Arnold Palmer Cup: 2022

== See also ==
- 2025 Korn Ferry Tour graduates
