= 2024 PGA Tour Americas =

Golf tour season

2024 PGA Tour Americas season
- Duration: March 21, 2024 – September 8, 2024
- Number of official events: 17
- Most wins: (Denmark) Frederik Kjettrup (3)
- Points list: (United States) Johnny Keefer

The 2024 PGA Tour Americas was the inaugural season of PGA Tour Americas, a third-tier tour operated and run by the PGA Tour.

== Changes for 2024 ==
The inaugural schedule for the new tour was released in November 2023. It featured a six-event "Latin America Swing" (events formerly played on PGA Tour Latinoamérica), and a 10-event "North America Swing" (events formerly played on PGA Tour Canada). The top 10 players on the points list at the end of the season earn status for the following Korn Ferry Tour season.

The points list was title sponsored as the Fortinet Cup, with Fortinet continuing their sponsorship from PGA Tour Canada since 2022.

== Schedule ==
The following table lists official events during the 2024 season.

Date	Tournament	Host country	Purse (US$)	Winner (Note: The number in parentheses after each winner's name is the number of PGA Tour Americas events they had won up to and including that tournament. It is rare for someone to accumulate many wins on PGA Tour Americas as success at this level usually leads to promotion to the Korn Ferry Tour.)	OWGR points
Mar 24	Bupa Championship	Mexico	225,000	(United States) Clay Feagler (1)	5.24
Mar 31	Totalplay Championship	Mexico	225,000	(Mexico) José de Jesús Rodríguez (1)	5.07
Apr 21	ECP Brazil Open	Brazil	225,000	(Canada) Matthew Anderson (1)	4.38
Apr 28	Diners Club Peru Open	Peru	225,000	(Canada) Stuart Macdonald (1)	4.70
May 5	Kia Open	Ecuador	225,000	(United States) Thomas Longbella (1)	4.97
May 19	Inter Rapidisimo Golf Championship	Colombia	225,000	(New Zealand) Harry Hillier (1)	4.70
Jun 23	Beachlands Victoria Open	Canada	225,000	(Denmark) Frederik Kjettrup (1)	4.29
Jun 30	ATB Classic	Canada	225,000	(Denmark) Frederik Kjettrup (2)	4.62
Jul 14	Explore NB Open	Canada	225,000	(United States) Ian Holt (1)	4.67
Jul 21	Bromont Open	Canada	225,000	(United States) Ryan Burnett (1)	6.13
Jul 28	Commissionaires Ottawa Open	Canada	225,000	(South Africa) Barend Botha (1)	6.47
Aug 4	BioSteel Championship	Canada	225,000	(South Africa) Barend Botha (2)	6.14
Aug 18	Elk Ridge Saskatchewan Open	Canada	225,000	(Canada) A. J. Ewart (1)	6.70
Aug 25	CentrePort Canada Rail Park Manitoba Open	Canada	225,000	(United States) Johnny Keefer (1)	6.92
Sep 1	CRMC Championship	United States	225,000	(Denmark) Frederik Kjettrup (3)	7.23
Sep 8	Fortinet Cup Championship	Canada	225,000	(United States) Will Cannon (1)	6.84

== Points list ==
The points list was titled as the Fortinet Cup and was based on tournament results during the season, calculated using a points-based system. The top 10 players on the points list earned status to play on the 2025 Korn Ferry Tour. (Note: Frederik Kjettrup (2nd) became ineligible for the 2025 Korn Ferry Tour season, having joined LIV Golf in December 2024. Kjettrup was therefore removed from the eligibility ranking; with Stuart Macdonald (11th) taking his place.)

Position	Player	Points
1	(United States) Johnny Keefer	2,022
2	(Denmark) Frederik Kjettrup	1,702
3	(Canada) Matthew Anderson	1,468
4	(South Africa) Barend Botha	1,005
5	(United States) Clay Feagler	881
6	(United States) Will Cannon	858
7	(New Zealand) Harry Hillier	844
8	(Scotland) Sandy Scott	814
9	(United States) Ryan Burnett	802
10	(United States) Ian Holt	800
11	(Canada) Stuart Macdonald	794
