= 2025 Korn Ferry Tour graduates =

This is a list of golfers who graduated from the Korn Ferry Tour in 2025. The top 20 players on the 2025 Korn Ferry Tour points list earned PGA Tour cards for 2026.

As part of changes to the PGA Tour's exemption system, the number of cards was reduced from 30 to 20, and all 20 graduates received fully-exempt status on the PGA Tour.

	Player	Points rank	Points
(United States)	Johnny Keefer*	1	2,359
(United States)	Chandler Blanchet*	2	1,972
(United States)	Austin Smotherman	3	1,883
(United States)	Neal Shipley^{†}	4	1,808
(Mexico)	Emilio González*	5	1,607
(United States)	Hank Lebioda	6	1,561
(Belgium)	Adrien Dumont de Chassart	7	1,457
(South Korea)	Kim Seong-hyeon	8	1,407
(South Africa)	Christo Lamprecht*	9	1,279
(United States)	Davis Chatfield*	10	1,279
(United States)	Zach Bauchou*	11	1,254
(United States)	Pierceson Coody	12	1,207
(South Korea)	Lee Seung-taek*	13	1,134
(United States)	Jeffrey Kang*	14	1,118
(Japan)	Kensei Hirata*	15	1,087
(United States)	Trace Crowe	16	1,085
(United States)	John VanDerLaan*	17	1,084
(China)	Dou Zecheng	18	1,072
(Canada)	Sudarshan Yellamaraju*	19	1,058
(Sweden)	Pontus Nyholm*	20	1,031

*PGA Tour rookie in 2026
^{†}First-time PGA Tour member in 2026, but ineligible for rookie status due to having played eight or more PGA Tour events as a professional in a previous season

== Wins on the PGA Tour in 2026 ==
No.	Date	Player	Tournament	Winning score	Margin of victory	Runner-up	Payout ($)
1	Oct 4	(United States) Austin Smotherman	Bank of Utah Championship	−26 (63-62-65-68=258)	2 strokes	(United States) Doug Ghim	1,080,000
2	Oct 26	(United States) Austin Smotherman (2)	Butterfield Bermuda Championship	−16 (65-66-66=197) (Note: Shortened to 54 holes due to weather.)	Playoff	(Republic of Ireland) Séamus Power	1,080,000

== Runner-up finishes on the PGA Tour in 2026 ==
No.	Date	Player	Tournament	Winner	Winning score	Runner-up score	Payout ($)
1	Feb 1	(United States) Pierceson Coody	Farmers Insurance Open	(England) Justin Rose	−23 (62-65-68-70=265)	−16 (68-70-69-65=272)	726,400
2	Mar 1	(United States) Austin Smotherman	Cognizant Classic	(Colombia) Nico Echavarría	−17 (63-72-66-66=267)	−15 (62-69-69-69=269)	726,400
3	Mar 8	(United States) Chandler Blanchet	Puerto Rico Open	(United States) Ricky Castillo	−17 (68-68-68-67=271)	−16 (64-67-74-67=272)	436,000

== See also ==
- 2025 PGA Tour Qualifying School graduates
- 2025 Race to Dubai dual card winners
