= 2025 PGA Tour Qualifying School graduates =

This is a list of the five players who earned 2026 PGA Tour cards through Q School in 2025. As part of changes to the PGA Tour's exemption system, the number of cards was capped at five, and all five graduates received fully-exempt status on the PGA Tour. A playoff was held to break a tie for the final card.

Place	Player	PGA Tour starts	Cuts made	Notes
1	(Canada) A. J. Ewart	2	0	
T2	(Argentina) Alejandro Tosti	52	22	1 Korn Ferry Tour win
T2	(Canada) Adam Svensson	159	97	1 PGA Tour win
T2	(Colombia) Marcelo Rozo	4	2	
T5	(United States) Dylan Wu	104	57	1 Korn Ferry Tour win

PGA Tour rookie in 2025

== See also ==
- 2025 Korn Ferry Tour graduates
- 2025 Race to Dubai dual card winners
