= Glen Hnatiuk =

Canadian professional golfer (born 1965)

Personal information
- Full name: Glen Anthony Hnatiuk
- Nationality: Canada
- Born: May 15, 1965 (age 61) Selkirk, Manitoba, Canada
- Height: 6 ft 2 in (1.88 m)
- Weight: 185 lb (84 kg; 13.2 st)

Career
- Sport: Golf
- College: University of Southern Mississippi
- Turned professional: 1990
- Former tours: PGA Tour; Nike Tour; U.S. Golf Tour
- Professional wins: 15

Number of wins by tour
- Korn Ferry Tour: 4
- Other: 11

Glen Anthony Hnatiuk (born May 15, 1965) is a Canadian professional golfer.

== Career ==
In 1965, Hnatiuk was born in Selkirk, Manitoba in Canada. He attended the University of Southern Mississippi for college in the United States.

In 1990, Hnatiuk turned professional. He played on several mini-tours in the United States, winning a number of tournaments, and led the money list on the Emerald Coast Tour in 1990 and 1991.

In 1992, Hnatiuk played his first full season on the PGA Tour's developmental tour, then called the Ben Hogan Tour. He picked up one win at the Ben Hogan Gulf Coast Classic during his rookie season and over $50,000 in earnings. He would play at Q-School later that year but finished T85 and did not earn is PGA Tour card. In 1993, in 28 events on the developmental tour, Hnatiuk made only four cuts and $4,000. Hnatiuk played full seasons on the developmental tour through 1997, picking up his second and third career wins in playoffs in 1995 and 1996 and earning about $200,000.

In 1998, he secured his PGA Tour card and earned $148,000 which was not enough to retain he PGA status and he once again returned to the developmental tour for the 1999 season. The 1999 Nike Tour season was again a good one for Hnatiuk, picking up his 4th career win and $176,000 in earnings. He played on the PGA Tour in 2000, finishing with two top-10s and 5 top-25s. He finished with $482,000 in earnings. The 2001 PGA Tour season included five top-25s and over $400,000 in earnings and conditional status for Hnatiuk for 2002. In 2002, he made over $500,000 with eight top-25s, one of which was at the St. Jude Classic, where he held a four stroke lead going into th final round, but shot a final round 77 to finish T14.

Hnatiuk would play a full PGA Tour season in 2003, nine events in 2004, and a full season in 2005. He made over $650,000 in those three seasons combined before returning to the developmental tour for 2006. His latest season on the developmental tour was in 2006, making 11 of 20 cuts and only a little over $50,000 in earnings. Hnatiuk played three Nationwide Tour events in 2007, making one cut. He has not played an event on the Nationwide Tour or PGA Tour since August 2007.

Hnatiuk plays in the Canadian Tour Players Cup, which is considered major on the Canadian Tour.

He has over $2,000,000 in career earnings on the PGA Tour and over $580,000 in career earnings on the developmental tour.

Hnatiuk now is a school teacher at the school [Explorer K-8].

== Awards and honors ==
- In 1987, Hnatiuk was named Manitoba Amateur Golfer of the Year.
- In 1988, he was named to the All-Metro Conference team while attending University of Southern Mississippi.
- In 1989, Hnatiuk was named the Manitoba PGA Player of the Year.
- In 2003, he was inducted into the University of Southern Mississippi Sports Hall of Fame.
- In 2012, Hnatiuk was inducted into the Manitoba Golf Hall of Fame and Museum.

== Amateur wins ==
- 1986 Manitoba Amateur

== Professional wins (15) ==
=== Nike Tour wins (4) ===
No.	Date	Tournament	Winning score	Margin of victory	Runner(s)-up
1	Mar 29, 1992	Ben Hogan Gulf Coast Classic	−9 (67-69-71=207)	1 stroke	(United States) Mike Donald, (United States) John Flannery, (United States) Bruce Zabriski
2	Sep 10, 1995	Nike Utah Classic	−13 (65-68-70=203)	Playoff	(United States) Franklin Langham, (United States) Harry Rudolph
3	May 19, 1996	Nike Carolina Classic	−11 (71-70-64=205) (Note: Shortened to 54 holes due to weather.)	Playoff	(New Zealand) Craig Perks
4	Sep 12, 1999	Nike Tri-Cities Open	−10 (68-72-69-69=278)	1 stroke	(United States) J. J. Henry, (United States) Larry Silveira

Nike Tour playoff record (2–1)

No.	Year	Tournament	Opponent(s)	Result
1	1995	Nike Gateway Classic	(United States) Chris Smith	Lost to birdie on first extra hole
2	1995	Nike Utah Classic	(United States) Franklin Langham, (United States) Harry Rudolph	Won with birdie on first extra hole
3	1996	Nike Carolina Classic	(New Zealand) Craig Perks	Won with birdie on first extra hole

=== U.S. Golf Tour wins (1) ===
No.	Date	Tournament	Winning score	Margin of victory	Runner-up
1	Apr 8, 1990	Jackson Open	−10 (67-74-72-65=278)	3 strokes	(United States) Tom Lehman

=== Other mini-tour wins (9) ===
- 1990 Emerald Coast Tiger Point Pro-Am Classic (Emerald Coast Tour), Santa Rosa Beach tournament (Emerald Coast Tour)
- 1991 Hidden Creek tournament, Hidden Creek tournament The Hombre tournament (all Emerald Coast Tour)
- 1992 Tanglewood Tournament, Shalimar Pointe tournament, Cotton Creek tournament, Pro-Am Classic (all Emerald Coast Tour)
- 1993 Disney World (Magnolia) tournament (Space Coast Tour)

== Team appearances ==
- World Cup (representing Canada): 2000

== See also ==
- 1997 Nike Tour graduates
- 1999 Nike Tour graduates
- List of golfers with most Web.com Tour wins
