= Álvaro Ortiz (golfer) =

Mexican professional golfer

Personal information
- Full name: Álvaro Ortiz Becerra
- Nationality: Mexico
- Born: 25 November 1995 (age 30) Guadalajara, Jalisco, Mexico
- Height: 6 ft 1 in (1.85 m)
- Weight: 176 lb (80 kg; 12.6 st)

Career
- Sport: Golf
- College: University of Arkansas
- Turned professional: 2019
- Current tour: PGA Tour
- Former tours: Korn Ferry Tour; PGA Tour Latinoamérica; Gira de Golf Profesional Mexicana
- Professional wins: 5

Number of wins by tour
- Korn Ferry Tour: 2
- Other: 3

Best results in major championships
- Masters Tournament: T36: 2019
- PGA Championship: DNP
- U.S. Open: CUT: 2021, 2025
- The Open Championship: DNP
Medal record
Summer Universiade
Silver medal – second place	2017 Taipei	Men's team

Álvaro Ortiz Becerra (born 25 November 1995) is a Mexican professional golfer.

== Early life ==
Ortiz was born in Guadalajara, Jalisco, Mexico. He played college golf in the United States at the University of Arkansas from 2014 to 2018. At the 2017 Summer Universiade, he finished 9th in the individual competition and was on the Mexican team that won the silver medal. He played in the Mexican team in the Eisenhower Trophy in 2014, 2016, and 2018. He won the 2019 Latin America Amateur Championship, a result which gained him an invitation to the 2019 Masters Tournament. Ortiz had been runner-up in the event in 2017 and 2018. In the Masters, he made the cut and finished tied for 36th place with a score of 286, 2-under-par, one stroke behind Viktor Hovland, who won the Silver Cup as the leading amateur.

His older brother, Carlos, is also a professional golfer.

== Professional career ==
Ortiz turned professional in 2019 after the Masters Tournament. In January 2020, Ortiz won a qualifying event for the PGA Tour Latinoamérica to gain a place on the tour. In the first event of the season, the Estrella del Mar Open, he was runner-up behind Alexandre Rocha. The tour was then suspended because of the COVID-19 pandemic, being replaced by the LocaliQ Series, which was held in the second half of 2020. The PGA Tour Latinoamérica season was extended into 2021 and Ortiz won the first event of the year, the Abierto Mexicano de Golf.

== Amateur wins ==
- 2013 Campeonato Nacional Interzonas LIII
- 2014 Torneo Nacional Copa Yucatán, World Junior Team Qualifier
- 2016 The Aggie Invitational, Torneo Annual Guadalajara Country Club
- 2017 Torneo Annual Guadalajara Country Club
- 2018 Torneo Annual Guadalajara Country Club, Campeonato Nacional Interclubes Mexico
- 2019 Latin America Amateur Championship

== Professional wins (5) ==
=== Korn Ferry Tour wins (2) ===
Legend
Finals events (1)
Other Korn Ferry Tour (1)

No.	Date	Tournament	Winning score	Margin of victory	Runner-up
1	31 May 2026	UNC Health Championship	−10 (67-62-69-72=270)	Playoff	(United States) Ross Steelman
2	13 Sep 2026	Simmons Bank Open	−26 (65-61-65-63=254)	4 strokes	(Scotland) Sandy Scott

Korn Ferry Tour playoff record (1–0)

No.	Year	Tournament	Opponent	Result
1	2026	UNC Health Championship	(United States) Ross Steelman	Won with birdie on first extra hole

=== PGA Tour Latinoamérica wins (1) ===
No.	Date	Tournament	Winning score	Margin of victory	Runner-up
1	28 Mar 2021	Abierto Mexicano de Golf	−23 (64-68-70-63=265)	3 strokes	(Canada) Drew Nesbitt

=== Gira de Golf Profesional Mexicana wins (2) ===
No.	Date	Tournament	Winning score	Margin of victory	Runner(s)-up
1	21 Oct 2023	Copa Simsa	−19 (63-67-64=194)	3 strokes	(Mexico) Roberto Lebrija
2	8 Dec 2023	El Jaguar Golf Open	−14 (66-70-66=202)	5 strokes	(Mexico) Emilio González, (Mexico) Alejandro Madariaga

== Results in major championships ==
Results not in chronological order in 2020.

Tournament	2019	2020	2021	2022	2023	2024	2025
Masters Tournament	T36						
PGA Championship							
U.S. Open			CUT				CUT
The Open Championship		NT					

Did not play

CUT = missed the halfway cut
"T" = tied
NT = no tournament due to COVID-19 pandemic

== Team appearances ==
Amateur

- Eisenhower Trophy (representing Mexico): 2014, 2016, 2018
- Arnold Palmer Cup (representing the International team): 2018

== See also ==
- 2026 Korn Ferry Tour graduates
