= LECOM Suncoast Classic =

Tournament information
- Location: Lakewood Ranch, Florida
- Established: 2019
- Course: Lakewood National Golf Club
- Par: 71
- Length: 7,113 yards (6,504 m)
- Tour: Korn Ferry Tour
- Format: Stroke play
- Prize fund: US$1,000,000
- Month played: April

Tournament record score
- Aggregate: 262 Mark Hubbard (2019); 262 Jérémy Gandon (2026)
- To par: −26 Mark Hubbard (2019)

Current champion
- (France) Jérémy Gandon

Location map
- Location in the United States Location in Florida

The LECOM Suncoast Classic is a golf tournament on the Korn Ferry Tour. It was first played from February 14–17, 2019, at the Lakewood National Golf Club in Lakewood Ranch, Florida. The 2023 tournament will take place April 20-23. The title sponsor is Lake Erie College of Osteopathic Medicine (LECOM) which has a campus in nearby Lakewood Ranch.

== Winners ==
Year	Winner	Score	To par	Margin of victory	Runner(s)-up
2026	(France) Jérémy Gandon	262	−22	1 stroke	(United States) Jay Card III (United States) Mitchell Meissner
2025	(United States) Neal Shipley	266	−18	Playoff	(South Korea) Lee Seung-taek
2024	(Sweden) Tim Widing	264	−20	Playoff	(United States) Patrick Cover (United States) Steven Fisk
2023	(United States) Scott Gutschewski	263	−21	Playoff	(United States) Logan McAllister
2022	(South Korea) An Byeong-hun	267	−17	1 stroke	(South Africa) M. J. Daffue (United States) Ben Griffin (United States) Scott Harrington (South Korea) Kim Seong-hyeon
2021	(United States) Hayden Buckley	271	−13	Playoff	(United States) Dawson Armstrong (United States) Taylor Montgomery
2020	(United States) Andrew Novak	265	−23	1 stroke	(United States) John Chin
2019	(United States) Mark Hubbard	262	−26	2 strokes	(United States) Maverick McNealy
