= Craig Kanada =

American golfer (born 1968)

Personal information
- Full name: Craig Andrew Kanada
- Nationality: United States
- Born: October 2, 1968 (age 58) Portland, Oregon, U.S.
- Height: 5 ft 9 in (1.75 m)
- Weight: 150 lb (68 kg; 11 st)

Career
- Sport: Golf
- College: Ohio State University
- Turned professional: 1991
- Current tour: Nationwide Tour
- Former tour: PGA Tour
- Professional wins: 2

Number of wins by tour
- Korn Ferry Tour: 2

Best results in major championships
- Masters Tournament: DNP
- PGA Championship: DNP
- U.S. Open: CUT: 2007
- The Open Championship: DNP

Craig Andrew Kanada (born October 2, 1968) is an American professional golfer. He was born in Portland, Oregon.

== Career ==
Kanada played on the Nationwide Tour in 1994–96, 1998–99, 2000, 2002, 2006, and 2009–10. He was a member of the PGA Tour in 1997, 2001, 2007 and 2008.

He won two tournaments on the Nationwide Tour in 2006 and finished 11th on the money list. That allowed him to move up to the PGA Tour.

== Amateur wins ==
- 1990 Western Amateur
- 1991 Pacific Northwest Amateur

== Professional wins (2) ==
=== Nationwide Tour wins (2) ===
Legend
Tour Championships (1)
Other Nationwide Tour (0)

No.	Date	Tournament	Winning score	Margin of victory	Runners-up
1	Sep 10, 2006	Utah EnergySolutions Championship	−16 (69-67-65-71=272)	1 stroke	(Australia) Gavin Coles, (United States) Ken Duke, (United States) Bryce Molder, (United States) Michael Putnam
2	Nov 12, 2006	Nationwide Tour Championship	−13 (73-64-72-66=275)	1 stroke	(Australia) Andrew Buckle, (United States) Matt Kuchar

Nationwide Tour playoff record (0–1)

No.	Year	Tournament	Opponents	Result
1	1999	Nike Dakota Dunes Open	(United States) Ryan Howison, (United States) Fran Quinn	Quinn won with birdie on first extra hole

== Results in major championships ==
Tournament	2007
U.S. Open	CUT

CUT = missed the half-way cut
Note: Kanada only played in the U.S. Open.

== See also ==
- 1996 PGA Tour Qualifying School graduates
- 2000 PGA Tour Qualifying School graduates
- 2006 Nationwide Tour graduates
