= Doc Redman =

American professional golfer (born 1997)

Personal information
- Full name: Doc Hudspeth Redman
- Nationality: United States
- Born: December 27, 1997 (age 28) Raleigh, North Carolina, U.S.
- Height: 5 ft 11 in (180 cm)
- Weight: 175 lb (79 kg)

Career
- Sport: Golf
- College: Clemson University
- Turned professional: 2018
- Current tour: PGA Tour
- Former tour: Korn Ferry Tour
- Professional wins: 2
- Highest ranking: 76 (November 1, 2020) (as of October 25, 2026)

Number of wins by tour
- Korn Ferry Tour: 2

Best results in major championships
- Masters Tournament: CUT: 2018
- PGA Championship: T29: 2020
- U.S. Open: DNP
- The Open Championship: T20: 2019

Doc Hudspeth Redman (born December 27, 1997) is an American professional golfer.

== High school career ==
Redman was born in Raleigh, North Carolina. He attended Leesville Road High School where he won the 2016 NCHSAA 4A state championship as a senior and was All-State four years in high school.

== College career ==
Competing for the Clemson Tigers, where he studied actuarial math. Redman won both the Jackrabbit and the Ka'anapali Classic in the fall of his freshman year.

== Amateur career ==
Redman won the 2017 U.S. Amateur, after finishing 62nd out of 64 in the stroke play qualifier. He was also runner-up at the 2017 Western Amateur, losing in a playoff.

Redman competed in the 2017 Walker Cup.

== Professional career ==
Redman turned professional following the 2018 NCAA Golf Championship and made his professional debut at the Memorial Tournament. By turning pro, he forfeited his exemptions into the 2018 U.S. Open and 2018 Open Championship which he earned via his U.S. Amateur win.

In June 2019, Redman shot a 62 to Monday qualify for the Rocket Mortgage Classic. In the tournament, he shot 68-67-67-67 and finished solo second to Nate Lashley, who ironically got into the field as an alternate after failing to secure his spot through the same qualifier. This earned him $788,400, entry into the 2019 Open Championship and Special Temporary Membership on the PGA Tour for the rest of the season, after starting 2019 on the third-tier Mackenzie Tour. Although he played in only six PGA events during the 2018–19 season, the 400 points he earned as a nonmember were just enough to surpass the 376 points needed to qualify for PGA Tour membership in the 2019–20 season. In 2020, he qualified for the FedEx Cup Playoffs, where he ranked number 71, just missing the BMW Championship. In 2021, Redman tied for third in the Safeway Open. At the Palmetto Championship, he finished in a six-way tie for second.

Redman struggled in 2023, finishing 159th in the FedEx Cup standings and was relegated to the Korn Ferry Tour. On the 2024 Korn Ferry Tour, he fell just short of regaining his PGA Tour card; needing a win at the season-ending Korn Ferry Tour Championship, Redman led for most of the final round but finished one stroke short of winner Braden Thornberry.

== Amateur wins ==
- 2013 Carolinas Junior
- 2016 The Jackrabbit, Ka'anapali Collegiate Classic
- 2017 U.S. Amateur

== Professional wins (2) ==
=== Korn Ferry Tour wins (2) ===
No.	Date	Tournament	Winning score	Margin of victory	Runner(s)-up
1	Mar 8, 2026	Astara Chile Classic	−19 (67-66-65-67=265)	5 strokes	(United States) Cooper Dossey, (United States) Michael Johnson
2	May 24, 2026	Visit Knoxville Open	−25 (64-64-66-65=259)	Playoff	(United States) Hunter Eichhorn

Korn Ferry Tour playoff record (1–0)

No.	Year	Tournament	Opponent	Result
1	2026	Visit Knoxville Open	(United States) Hunter Eichhorn	Won with eagle on first extra hole

== Results in major championships ==
Results not in chronological order before 2019 and in 2020.

Tournament	2018	2019	2020
Masters Tournament	CUT		
PGA Championship			T29
U.S. Open			
The Open Championship		T20	NT

Did not play

CUT = missed the half-way cut
"T" = tied
NT = No tournament due to COVID-19 pandemic

== Results in The Players Championship ==
Tournament	2021	2022	2023
The Players Championship	CUT	T26	CUT

CUT = missed the halfway cut
"T" indicates a tie for a place

== U.S. national team appearances ==
Amateur

- Walker Cup: 2017 (winners)

== See also ==
- 2026 Korn Ferry Tour graduates
