= UNC Health Championship =

Golf tournament

Tournament information
- Location: Raleigh, North Carolina
- Established: 1994
- Course: Raleigh Country Club
- Par: 70
- Length: 7,257 yards (6,636 m)
- Tour: Korn Ferry Tour
- Format: Stroke play
- Prize fund: US$1,000,000
- Month played: May

Tournament record score
- Aggregate: 259 Trace Crowe (2025)
- To par: −21 Sebastian Cappelen (2019) −21 Stephan Jäger (2021) −21 Mito Pereira (2021) −21 Trace Crowe (2025)

Current champion
- (Mexico) Álvaro Ortiz

Final champion
- Location in the United States Location in North Carolina

The UNC Health Championship (formerly Rex Hospital Open) is a regular golf tournament on the Korn Ferry Tour. It is played annually at the Raleigh Country Club in Raleigh, North Carolina.

== Winners ==
Year	Winner	Score	To par	Margin of victory	Runner(s)-up
UNC Health Championship
2026	(Mexico) Álvaro Ortiz	270	−10	Playoff	(United States) Ross Steelman
2025	(United States) Trace Crowe	259	−21	5 strokes	(United States) Davis Chatfield (Scotland) Martin Laird (United States) Hank Lebioda
2024	(Japan) Kaito Onishi	272	−8	1 stroke	(United States) Max McGreevy
2023	(Argentina) Jorge Fernández-Valdés	267	−13	Playoff	(United States) Trent Phillips
Rex Hospital Open
2022	(United States) Davis Thompson	267	−17	1 stroke	(Sweden) Vincent Norrman (United States) Andrew Yun
2021	(Chile) Mito Pereira	263	−21	Playoff	(Germany) Stephan Jäger
2020	Canceled due to the COVID-19 pandemic				
2019	(Denmark) Sebastian Cappelen	263	−21	3 strokes	(United States) Grayson Murray (United States) Zack Sucher
2018	(United States) Joey Garber	266	−18	1 stroke	(United States) Scott Langley (United States) Hank Lebioda
2017	(United States) Conrad Shindler	269	−15	Playoff	(United States) Chesson Hadley
2016	(United States) Trey Mullinax	270	−14	2 strokes	(United States) Brady Schnell
2015	(United States) Kyle Thompson (3)	267	−17	Playoff	(Argentina) Miguel Ángel Carballo (United States) Patton Kizzire
2014	(United States) Byron Smith	268	−16	4 strokes	(Australia) Scott Gardiner (United States) Harold Varner III
2013	(United States) Chesson Hadley	265	−19	2 strokes	(New Zealand) Danny Lee
2012	(United States) James Hahn	271	−13	Playoff	(United States) Scott Parel
2011	(United States) Kyle Thompson (2)	270	−14	1 stroke	(United States) Scott Brown (United States) Martin Flores (United States) Troy Kelly
2010	(United States) John Riegger	193 (Note: Shortened to 54 holes due to rain.)	−20	5 strokes	(United States) Chris Nallen
2009	(United States) Kevin Johnson	266	−18	Playoff	(United States) Jeff Gallagher
2008	(United States) Scott Gutschewski	270	−14	2 strokes	(United States) Chad Ginn (Mexico) Esteban Toledo
2007	(United States) Kyle Thompson	268	−16	2 strokes	(United States) Bob Burns
2006	(South Africa) Brenden Pappas	268	−16	1 stroke	(South Korea) Charlie Wi
2005	(United States) Eric Axley	270	−14	2 strokes	(United States) Troy Matteson
SAS Carolina Classic
2004	(United States) Chris Anderson	271	−13	Playoff	(United States) Jason Buha (Australia) Paul Gow (Australia) Brendan Jones
2003	(Canada) David Morland IV	268	−16	1 stroke	(United States) Rob Bradley (United States) Vaughn Taylor
2002	(United States) Zoran Zorkic	274	−10	1 stroke	(United States) Doug Barron
Buy.com Carolina Classic
2001	(United States) John Maginnes	269	−15	2 strokes	(Japan) Ryuji Imada
2000	(Australia) Mark Hensby	266	−18	Playoff	(South Africa) Manny Zerman
Nike Carolina Classic
1999	(United States) Vance Veazey	269	−15	1 stroke	(United States) Steve Haskins (Canada) Glen Hnatiuk
1998	(United States) Brian Bateman	266	−18	1 stroke	(United States) Jimmy Green
1997	(Canada) Ahmad Bateman	284	−4	1 stroke	(United States) Steve Flesch (United States) Dennis Paulson (Australia) Terry Price
1996	(Canada) Glen Hnatiuk	205	−11	Playoff	(New Zealand) Craig Perks
1995	(United States) Michael Christie	266	−22	2 strokes	(United States) Sean Murphy
1994	(United States) Skip Kendall	276	−12	2 strokes	(United States) Pat Bates
