= Jérémy Gandon =

French professional golfer (born 1996)

Personal information
- Nationality: France
- Born: 4 December 1996 (age 29) Valence, Drôme, France
- Height: 6 ft 0 in (183 cm)
- Weight: 190 lb (86 kg)
- Life partner: Jordan

Career
- Sport: Golf
- College: Kansas State University
- Turned professional: 2019
- Current tour: PGA Tour
- Former tours: Korn Ferry Tour; PGA Tour Americas; Asian Tour; PGA Tour Latinoamérica; PGA Tour Canada
- Professional wins: 2

Number of wins by tour
- Korn Ferry Tour: 2

Jérémy Gandon (born 4 December 1996) is a French professional golfer who plays on the PGA Tour.

== Early life and amateur career ==
Grandon was born in Valence, Drôme and grew up in Charpey, France. He enjoyed success playing in European tournaments, finishing in second place at the 2016 Grand Prix de la Biarritz Cup, 2018 Swiss International Amateur, and the 2018 French International Amateur Championship.

Gandon played four seasons at Kansas State University (2015–2019), where his best achievement was co-medalist honors at the 2018 Big-12 Conference Championship at Southern Hills Country Club.

Gandon represented France at the Eisenhower Trophy twice, in 2016 together with Ugo Coussaud and Antoine Rozner, and in 2018 with Frédéric Lacroix and Victor Veyret. He also played in the European Amateur Team Championship twice, in 2017 in Austria, and in 2018 in Germany, where the team was knocked out by England in the quarterfinals both times.

== Professional career ==
Grandon turned professional in 2019 and joined the PGA Tour Canada. In 2020, he joined the PGA Tour Latinoamérica, where he in 2021 tied for 3rd at the Bupa Championship and was runner-up at the 115th Argentine Open, three strokes behind home player Jorge Fernández-Valdés. In 2023, he lost a playoff at the final event of the season, the Bupa Tour Championship, and played on the Asian Tour during the fall.

Grandon joined the 2025 Korn Ferry Tour. He won the Club Car Championship after a playoff with Rick Lamb, and finished 22nd in the season rankings.

In 2026, he won a second title, the LECOM Suncoast Classic in Florida.

== Amateur wins ==
- 2014 Grand Prix du Cap d'Agde
- 2018 Hawkeye Invitational, Big 12 Championship
- 2019 Mission Inn Spring Spectacular

== Professional wins (2) ==
=== Korn Ferry Tour wins (2) ===
No.	Date	Tournament	Winning score	Margin of victory	Runner(s)-up
1	6 Apr 2025	Club Car Championship	−17 (67-70-65-69=271)	Playoff	(United States) Rick Lamb
2	5 Apr 2026	LECOM Suncoast Classic	−22 (67-65-65-65=262)	1 stroke	(United States) Jay Card III, (United States) Mitchell Meissner

Korn Ferry playoff record (1–0)

No.	Year	Tournament	Opponent	Result
1	2025	Club Car Championship	(United States) Rick Lamb	Won with birdie on first extra hole

== Team appearances ==
Amateur

- Eisenhower Trophy (representing France): 2016, 2018
- European Amateur Team Championship (representing France): 2017, 2018

== See also ==
- 2026 Korn Ferry Tour graduates
