= Compliance Solutions Championship =

Golf tournament

Tournament information
- Location: Owasso, Oklahoma
- Established: 2023
- Course: Patriot Golf Club
- Par: 71
- Length: 7,120 yards (6,510 m)
- Tour: Korn Ferry Tour
- Format: Stroke play
- Prize fund: US$1,500,000
- Month played: September

Tournament record score
- Aggregate: 251 Adrien Dumont de Chassart (2025)
- To par: −33 as above

Current champion
- (Scotland) Sandy Scott

Location map
- Location in the United States Location in Oklahoma

The Compliance Solutions Championship is a golf tournament on the Korn Ferry Tour. It is played at the Patriot Golf Club in Owasso, Oklahoma, United States. From 2023 to 2024, it was played at Jimmie Austin OU Golf Club in Norman, Oklahoma. After two years as a regular season event, in 2025 it became a Korn Ferry Tour Finals event.

== Winners ==
Korn Ferry Tour (Finals event)	2025–
Korn Ferry Tour (Regular)	2023–2024

#	Year	Winner	Score	To par	Margin of victory	Runner-up	Ref.
4th	2026	(Scotland) Sandy Scott	256	−24	Playoff	(United States) William Sides	
3rd	2025	(Belgium) Adrien Dumont de Chassart	251	−33	7 strokes	(China) Dou Zecheng	
2nd	2024	(United States) John Pak	265	−23	3 strokes	(United States) Jackson Suber	
1st	2023	(United States) Jimmy Stanger	266	−22	1 stroke	(Puerto Rico) Rafael Campos	
