= Neal Shipley =

American professional golfer (born 2000)

Personal information
- Nationality: United States
- Born: December 23, 2000 (age 25)

Career
- Sport: Golf
- College: James Madison University; Ohio State University
- Turned professional: 2024
- Current tour: PGA Tour
- Former tours: Korn Ferry Tour; PGA Tour Americas
- Professional wins: 3
- Highest ranking: 85 (August 10, 2025) (as of October 25, 2026)

Number of wins by tour
- Korn Ferry Tour: 2
- Other: 1

Best results in major championships
- Masters Tournament: T53: 2024
- PGA Championship: DNP
- U.S. Open: T26: 2024
- The Open Championship: DNP

Neal Shipley (born December 23, 2000) is an American professional golfer from Pittsburgh, Pennsylvania.

== Amateur career ==
Shipley was raised in Mt. Lebanon, Pennsylvania, a suburb south of downtown Pittsburgh.

Shipley was low amateur at the 2024 Masters Tournament and the 2024 U.S. Open. He qualified for both these tournaments by being runner-up at the 2023 U.S. Amateur.

Shipley played three seasons of golf at James Madison University before graduating and transferring to Ohio State University.

== Professional career ==
After finishing as the low amateur in both the 2024 Masters Tournament and the 2024 U.S. Open, Shipley turned professional. His first event as a professional was at the Beachlands Victoria Open on the 2024 PGA Tour Americas. Shipley finished tied for ninth place.

In his first three events on the PGA Tour after turning pro, Shipley had a top-20 finish at the 2024 Rocket Mortgage Classic, a missed cut at the John Deere Classic, and a T-6 at the ISCO Championship.

The following season, he earned his first professional win, defeating Lee Seung-taek on the fifth playoff hole to claim the LECOM Suncoast Classic title on the Korn Ferry Tour. In July 2025, Shipley shot a final-round 64 to come back from seven shots back to claim the title at The Ascendant for his second Korn Ferry Tour victory of the season.

On February 9, 2026, while playing for the Bay Golf Club, Shipley made the first TGL hole in one during his debut match, with the Bay Golf Club going on to win the match 11–5.

== Amateur wins ==
- 2018 Bridgestone Golf Tournament of Champions
- 2020 The Fox Puss Invitational
- 2021 The Fox Puss Invitational
- 2022 Pennsylvania Amateur Championship
- 2024 Southwestern Invitational

== Professional wins (3) ==
=== Korn Ferry Tour wins (2) ===
No.	Date	Tournament	Winning score	Margin of victory	Runner(s)-up
1	Apr 19, 2025	LECOM Suncoast Classic	−18 (64-68-70-64=266)	Playoff	(South Korea) Lee Seung-taek
2	Jul 13, 2025	The Ascendant	−18 (68-71-67-64=270)	1 stroke	(United States) Kevin Dougherty, (Argentina) Jorge Fernández-Valdés

Korn Ferry Tour playoff record (1–0)

No.	Year	Tournament	Opponent	Result
1	2025	LECOM Suncoast Classic	(South Korea) Lee Seung-taek	Won with birdie on fifth extra hole

=== Other wins (1) ===
- 2022 Western Pennsylvania Open Championship (as an amateur)

== Results in major championships ==
Tournament	2024	2025	2026
Masters Tournament	T53LA		
PGA Championship			
U.S. Open	T26LA		T65
The Open Championship			

Did not play

LA = low amateur
"T" = tied

== See also ==
- 2025 Korn Ferry Tour graduates
