= The Blue Championship =

Golf tournament in Berthoud, Colorado

Tournament information
- Location: Berthoud, Colorado
- Established: 2019
- Course: TPC Colorado
- Par: 72
- Length: 7,995 yards (7,311 m)
- Tour: Korn Ferry Tour
- Format: Stroke play
- Prize fund: US$1,000,000
- Month played: July
- Website: thebluechampionship.com

Tournament record score
- Aggregate: 266 Cristóbal del Solar (2024); 266 Ross Steelman (2026)
- To par: −22 as above

Current champion
- (United States) Ross Steelman

Location map
- Location in the United States Location in Colorado

The Blue Championship is a golf tournament on the Korn Ferry Tour. Formerly known as the TPC Colorado Championship and then The Ascendant presented by Blue. it was first played in July 2019 in Berthoud, Colorado. This was the first professional golf tournament played in Colorado since 2014. In 2021, this tournament was the first ever recipient of two Korn Ferry Tour awards in a singular year; Tournament of the Year and Volunteer of the Year.

Blue Federal Credit Union was named title sponsor of the event starting in 2026.

The proceeds from The Blue Championship benefit local Colorado charities.

== Winners ==
Year	Winner	Score	To par	Margin of victory	Runner(s)-up
The Blue Championship
2026	(United States) Ross Steelman	266	−22	1 stroke	(United States) Tommy Morrison
The Ascendant
2025	(United States) Neal Shipley	270	−18	1 stroke	(United States) Kevin Dougherty (Argentina) Jorge Fernández-Valdés
2024	(Chile) Cristóbal del Solar	266	−22	4 strokes	(United States) Brian Campbell (United States) Matthew Riedel
2023	(United States) Nicholas Lindheim	268	−20	2 strokes	(United States) Max Greyserman
2022	(China) Dou Zecheng	271	−17	1 stroke	(China) Yuan Yechun
TPC Colorado Championship
2021	(United States) Tag Ridings	272	−16	Playoff	(England) David Skinns (Taiwan) Kevin Yu
2020	(United States) Will Zalatoris	273	−15	1 stroke	(United States) Chase Johnson
2019	(Argentina) Nelson Ledesma	273	−15	1 stroke	(Australia) Brett Coletta
