= Hank Lebioda =

American professional golfer (born 1994)

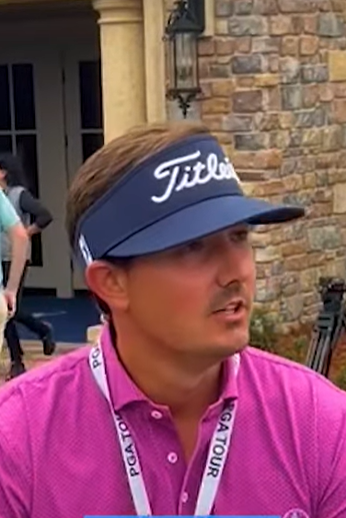

Personal information
- Full name: Henry Warren Lebioda
- Nationality: United States
- Born: January 14, 1994 (age 32) Orlando, Florida, U.S.
- Height: 5 ft 11 in (1.80 m)
- Weight: 190 lb (86 kg; 14 st)

Career
- Sport: Golf
- College: Florida State University
- Turned professional: 2016
- Current tour: PGA Tour
- Former tours: Korn Ferry Tour; PGA Tour Canada; PGA Tour Latinoamérica
- Professional wins: 2

Number of wins by tour
- Korn Ferry Tour: 1
- Other: 1

Best results in major championships
- Masters Tournament: DNP
- PGA Championship: DNP
- U.S. Open: CUT: 2023
- The Open Championship: DNP

Henry Warren Lebioda (born January 14, 1994) is an American professional golfer.

Lebioda played college golf at Florida State University, where he won two events. After his first season, Lebioda was named ACC Freshman of the Year. As a senior, he was named ACC Player of the Year. Entering college he was the 4th ranked player in Golf World's junior world rankings. Lebioda has battled with Crohn's disease since his senior year in high school, making his road to a professional career in golf a notable one.

Lebioda began his professional career on the PGA Tour Canada in 2016. In 2017, he played both the PGA Tour Canada and the PGA Tour Latinoamérica. His first professional win came at PGA Tour Canada's 2017 Mackenzie Investments Open, which he won by eight shots.

Lebioda's top-10 season on the 2017 PGA Tour Latinoamérica advanced him to the finals of the Web.com Tour qualifying event. He finished tied for 30th in qualifying, which earned him his 2018 Web.com Tour card. In his rookie season, he finished the regular season 25th on the money list, earning a promotion to the PGA Tour for the 2018–19 season.

He is a graduate of Trinity Preparatory School in Winter Park, Florida.

== Amateur wins ==
- 2010 Florida Junior Championship
- 2012 Florida Junior Championship
- 2014 SunTrust Gator Invitational
- 2016 Seminole Intercollegiate

== Professional wins (2) ==
=== Korn Ferry Tour wins (1) ===
No.	Date	Tournament	Winning score	Margin of victory	Runner-up
1	Jan 15, 2025	The Bahamas Golf Classic	−18 (67-62-67-66=262)	Playoff	(South Korea) Kim Seong-hyeon

Korn Ferry Tour playoff record (1–0)

No.	Year	Tournament	Opponent	Result
1	2025	The Bahamas Golf Classic	(South Korea) Kim Seong-hyeon	Won with birdie on first extra hole

=== PGA Tour Canada wins (1) ===
No.	Date	Tournament	Winning score	Margin of victory	Runners-up
1	Jul 23, 2017	Mackenzie Investments Open	−20 (64-64-66-66=260)	8 strokes	(United States) Jonathan Garrick, (United States) Rico Hoey, (Canada) Daniel Kim

== Results in major championships ==
Tournament	2023
Masters Tournament	
PGA Championship	
U.S. Open	CUT
The Open Championship	

Did not play

CUT = missed the half-way cut

== Results in The Players Championship ==
Tournament	2022
The Players Championship	T63

"T" indicates a tie for a place

== Team appearances ==
Professional

- Aruba Cup (representing PGA Tour Latinoamérica): 2017

== See also ==
- 2018 Web.com Tour Finals graduates
- 2019 Korn Ferry Tour Finals graduates
- 2025 Korn Ferry Tour graduates
