= 2025 Race to Dubai dual card winners =

This is a list of the 10 European Tour (DP World Tour) players who earned PGA Tour card for the 2026 season via the 2025 Race to Dubai.

The top 10 players on the Race to Dubai (not otherwise exempt) earned status to play on the 2026 PGA Tour. They were as follows:

			2025 European Tour		2026 PGA Tour				
Rank	Cty	Player	R2D pos.	Points	Starts	Cuts made	Best finish	FedEx Cup rank	Prize money ($)
1	(England)	Marco Penge*	2	4,008					
2	(Norway)	Kristoffer Reitan*	8	2,762					
3	(France)	Adrien Saddier*	9	2,643					
4	(Sweden)	Alex Norén	10	2,573					
5	(England)	John Parry*	11	2,538					
6	(China)	Haotong Li^{†}	13	2,470					
7	(Japan)	Keita Nakajima*	14	2,253					
8	(Denmark)	Rasmus Neergaard-Petersen*	15	2,213					
9	(England)	Jordan Smith*	16	2,203					
10	(England)	Dan Brown*^	17	2,173					

* PGA Tour rookie in 2026
† First-time PGA Tour member in 2026, but ineligible for rookie status due to having played eight or more PGA TOUR events as a professional in a previous season
^ Originally finished 11th among players not otherwise exempt on the PGA Tour, but earned the 10th and final spot after Laurie Canter, who had finished 7th in the final 2025 Race to Dubai rankings (and 2nd among players not otherwise exempt) opted instead to join LIV Golf for the 2026 season

== 2026 PGA Tour winners ==
No.	Date	Player	Tournament	Winning score	Margin of victory	Runner(s)-up	Prize money ($)
1	10 May	(Norway) Kristoffer Reitan	Truist Championship	−15 (66-70-64-69=269)	2 strokes	(United States) Rickie Fowler, (Denmark) Nicolai Højgaard	3,600,000

== 2026 PGA Tour runner-up finishes ==
No.	Date	Player	Tournament	Winners	Winning score	Runner-up score	Prize money ($)
1	26 Apr	(Norway) Kristoffer Reitan (with (Norway) Kristoffer Ventura)	Zurich Classic of New Orleans	(England) Matt Fitzpatrick and (England) Alex Fitzpatrick	−31 (63-65-57-71=257)	−30 (63-67-63-65=258)	463,719

== See also ==
- 2025 Korn Ferry Tour graduates
- 2025 PGA Tour Qualifying School graduates
