= Julian Suri =

American professional golfer (born 1991)

Personal information
- Nationality: United States
- Born: April 6, 1991 (age 35) New York City, New York, U.S.
- Height: 6 ft 1 in (185 cm)
- Weight: 170 lb (77 kg)

Career
- Sport: Golf
- College: Duke University
- Turned professional: 2013
- Current tour: Korn Ferry Tour
- Former tours: European Tour; Challenge Tour
- Professional wins: 3
- Highest ranking: 60 (August 12, 2018) (as of October 25, 2026)

Number of wins by tour
- European Tour: 1
- Korn Ferry Tour: 1
- Challenge Tour: 1

Best results in major championships
- Masters Tournament: DNP
- PGA Championship: T19: 2018
- U.S. Open: DNP
- The Open Championship: T28: 2018

Julian Suri (born April 6, 1991) is an American professional golfer who currently plays on the Korn Ferry Tour.

== Amateur career ==
Suri played college golf at Duke University where he won three events and was an All-American in 2012.

== Professional career ==
Suri turned professional in 2013.

In 2016 he played all three stages of the European Tour Qualifying School. He finished just one stroke away from qualifying for the European Tour, to earn a place on the Challenge Tour.

In May 2017 he was runner-up in the Open de Portugal and two weeks later earned his first professional win at the D+D Real Czech Challenge on the Challenge Tour. Suri qualified for the 2017 Open Championship, his first major championship, through Final Qualifying. In August 2017 Suri had his first European Tour win, the Made in Denmark tournament. Despite only playing a partial season on the European Tour, Suri performed well enough to qualify for the DP World Tour Championship, where he finished tied for 8th, and he ended the season 52nd in the Road to Dubai.

== Personal life ==
Suri is of Indian and Mexican descent.

== Amateur wins ==
- 2011 Rod Myers Invitational
- 2012 John Burns Intercollegiate, Rod Myers Invitational

== Professional wins (3) ==
=== European Tour wins (1) ===
No.	Date	Tournament	Winning score	Margin of victory	Runner-up
1	Aug 27, 2017	Made in Denmark	−19 (67-69-65-64=265)	4 strokes	(England) David Horsey

=== Korn Ferry Tour wins (1) ===
No.	Date	Tournament	Winning score	Margin of victory	Runners-up
1	Aug 3, 2025	Utah Championship	−18 (69-66-64-63=262)	2 strokes	(South Africa) Barend Botha, (United States) Trace Crowe, (Japan) Kensei Hirata, (United States) Spencer Levin, (United States) Taylor Montgomery

=== Challenge Tour wins (1) ===
No.	Date	Tournament	Winning score	Margin of victory	Runner-up
1	May 28, 2017	D+D Real Czech Challenge	−23 (67-65-63-70=265)	2 strokes	(Finland) Tapio Pulkkanen

== Results in major championships ==
Tournament	2017	2018
Masters Tournament		
U.S. Open		
The Open Championship	CUT	T28
PGA Championship		T19

Tournament	2019
Masters Tournament	
PGA Championship	CUT
U.S. Open	
The Open Championship	

Did not play

CUT = missed the half-way cut
"T" = tied

== Results in World Golf Championships ==
Tournament	2018
Championship	
Match Play	T29
Invitational	
Champions	T64

Did not play

"T" = Tied
