= Taylor Montgomery =

American professional golfer (born 1995)

Personal information
- Full name: Taylor Allen Montgomery
- Nationality: United States
- Born: January 30, 1995 (age 31) Las Vegas, Nevada, U.S.
- Height: 6 ft 3 in (1.91 m)
- Weight: 215 lb (98 kg; 15.4 st)

Career
- Sport: Golf
- College: University of Nevada, Las Vegas
- Turned professional: 2017
- Current tour: PGA Tour
- Former tour: Korn Ferry Tour
- Professional wins: 1
- Highest ranking: 51 (January 29, 2023) (as of October 25, 2026)

Best results in major championships
- Masters Tournament: DNP
- PGA Championship: T65: 2023
- U.S. Open: T57: 2021
- The Open Championship: DNP

Taylor Allen Montgomery (born January 30, 1995) is an American professional golfer. He plays on the PGA Tour.

== Personal life ==
The son of Mikella and Monte Montgomery, Montgomery was born in Las Vegas, Nevada on January 30, 1995. His father Monte is originally from Colorado, and was a walk-on golfer at the University of Nevada, Las Vegas. He played for the UNLV Rebels from 1989 to 1992, becoming a second-team All-American. Monte made his sole appearance on the PGA Tour in 1994, after Monday qualifying for the Buick Invitational of California, held at Torrey Pines Golf Course. He finished in 24th place. Monte later became the general manager at Shadow Creek Golf Course in Las Vegas.

== Amateur career ==
Montgomery graduated from Foothill High School in 2013, where he lettered all four years in golf. He won the state's 4A boys high school individual championship in 2011 and 2013. He was also a starter for the school's basketball team, playing from 2011 to 2013 as a forward.

Montgomery then followed in the footsteps of his father and attended the University of Nevada, Las Vegas, where he played collegiate golf. He was coached by the long-time leader of the UNLV golf program, Dwaine Knight. This was the first father-son combination to both have played under Coach Knight. As a sophomore, Montgomery won the 2014 Gene Miranda Falcon Invitational, with a score of 10-under 206, one ahead of AJ McInerney and Yannik Paul.

Montgomery struggled with his golf game in the final two years at university and often could not make the team. He had difficulties keeping the ball in play, causing him to use no more than 2-iron off the tee throughout the entirety of some tournaments. UNLV teammate Harry Hall said Montgomery has "always been a great chipper and putter" but struggled getting the ball to the green during that time. Montgomery majored in communications and graduated in 2017.

== Professional career ==
Montgomery turned professional in 2017. In October of that year, he won the inaugural Major Series of Putting tournament. He received a prize of $75,000, and also won another $15,000 for winning the team portion of the tournament with his former UNLV teammate Kurt Kitayama. This prize money helped to bankroll Montgomery's burgeoning golf career.

In September 2018, Montgomery birdied the first playoff hole to win the Sand Hollow Leavitt Group Open, a mini-tour event in Utah. This win granted Montgomery an exemption to play in the 2019 Utah Championship on the Web.com Tour.

== Professional wins (1) ==
=== Other wins (1) ===
No.	Date	Tournament	Winning score	Margin of victory	Runners-up
1	Aug 11, 2019	Long Beach Open	−24 (65-67-64-68=264)	5 strokes	(United States) Blake Abercrombie, (United States) Matt Picanso

== Playoff record ==
Korn Ferry Tour playoff record (0–1)

No.	Year	Tournament	Opponents	Result
1	2021	LECOM Suncoast Classic	(United States) Dawson Armstrong, (United States) Hayden Buckley	Buckley won with birdie on first extra hole

== Results in major championships ==
Tournament	2021	2022	2023	2024	2025	2026
Masters Tournament						
PGA Championship			T65			
U.S. Open	T57	CUT	CUT			CUT
The Open Championship						

Did not play

CUT = missed the half-way cut
"T" = tied

== Results in The Players Championship ==
Tournament	2023	2024
The Players Championship	T44	T11

"T" indicates a tie for a place

== Results in World Golf Championships ==
Tournament	2023
Match Play	T17

"T" = Tied

== See also ==
- 2022 Korn Ferry Tour Finals graduates
