= Nashville Golf Open =

Simmons Bank Open

Tournament information
- Location: Franklin, Tennessee
- Established: 2016
- Course: Vanderbilt Legends Club (North)
- Par: 70
- Length: 7,190 yards (6,570 m)
- Tour: Korn Ferry Tour
- Format: Stroke play
- Prize fund: US$1,500,000
- Month played: September

Tournament record score
- Aggregate: 254 Álvaro Ortiz (2026)
- To par: −26 as above

Current champion
- (Mexico) Álvaro Ortiz

Location map
- Location in the United States Location in Tennessee

The Simmons Bank Open is a golf tournament on the Korn Ferry Tour. It was first played in June 2016 as the Nashville Golf Open at the Nashville Golf & Athletic Club in Brentwood, Tennessee. After the event was canceled in 2020 due to COVID-19, it moved to The Grove in May 2021 as a regular season Korn Ferry event. Once it was named the 2022 Korn Ferry Tour Tournament of the Year, it was announced that the event would move to September to be a part of the Korn Ferry Tour Finals for the 2023 Korn Ferry Tour season and beyond. Beginning in 2024, the event moved to the Vanderbilt Legends Club's North Course as The Grove will be hosting LIV Golf Nashville's event.

== Winners ==
Korn Ferry Tour (Finals event)	2023–Present
Korn Ferry Tour (Regular)	2016–2022

#	Year	Winner	Score	To par	Margin of victory	Runner(s)-up
Simmons Bank Open
11th	2026	(Mexico) Álvaro Ortiz	254	−26	4 strokes	(Scotland) Sandy Scott
10th	2025	(United States) Zach Bauchou	257	−23	2 strokes	(United States) Austin Hitt
9th	2024	(United States) Paul Peterson	260	−20	1 stroke	(United States) Matt Atkins
8th	2023	(United States) Grayson Murray	271	−17	3 strokes	(United States) Mason Andersen (United States) Carter Jenkins (United States) Jamie Lovemark
7th	2022	(United States) Brent Grant	272	−16	1 stroke	(Taiwan) Kevin Yu
6th	2021	(United States) Austin Smotherman	272	−16	3 strokes	(United States) Paul Haley II (China) Yuan Yechun
5th	2020	Canceled due to the COVID-19 pandemic				
Nashville Golf Open
4th	2019	(United States) Robby Shelton	273	−15	Playoff	(United States) Scottie Scheffler
3rd	2018	(Australia) Cameron Davis	270	−18	1 stroke	(United States) Kevin Dougherty (United States) Lanto Griffin (United States) Josh Teater
2nd	2017	(United States) Lanto Griffin	272	−16	Playoff	(Mexico) Abraham Ancer
1st	2016	(United States) James Driscoll	269	−19	3 strokes	(United States) Brian Campbell

== See also ==
- Nashville Invitational, a PGA Tour event (1944–1946)
