= Adrien Dumont de Chassart =

Belgian professional golfer (born 2000)

Personal information
- Full name: Adrien Dumont de Chassart
- Nationality: Belgium
- Born: 1 March 2000 (age 26) Villers-la-Ville, Belgium
- Height: 6 ft 1 in (185 cm)

Career
- Sport: Golf
- College: University of Illinois
- Turned professional: 2023
- Current tour: PGA Tour
- Former tour: Korn Ferry Tour
- Professional wins: 2

Number of wins by tour
- Korn Ferry Tour: 2

Best results in major championships
- Masters Tournament: DNP
- PGA Championship: DNP
- U.S. Open: T53: 2026
- The Open Championship: DNP

Achievements and awards
- Korn Ferry Tour Rookie of the Year: 2023

Adrien Dumont de Chassart (born 1 March 2000) is a Belgian professional golfer.

== Amateur career ==
When Dumont de Chassart was 15, he finished second in the Orange Bowl tournament in Miami, one of the major tournaments for players of 18 years or under. In 2019, he was awarded Belgian Male Amateur Golfer of the Year. In 2021, he finished third at the European Amateur Championships.

Dumont de Chassart studied at the University of Illinois from 2018 to 2023. He was part of the international team at the Arnold Palmer Cup in 2021 and 2022. In 2021, he was named one of the two Big Ten Golfers of the Year.

In 2022, he played at the U.S. Open, after coming through the qualification tournament in Springfield, Ohio.

== Professional career ==
Dumont de Chassart turned professional in June 2023 and won in his professional debut; the BMW Charity Pro-Am on the Korn Ferry Tour, defeating Josh Teater in a playoff. The following week, at the Blue Cross and Blue Shield of Kansas Wichita Open, he again tied for the lead after 72 holes, but was defeated on the first extra hole of the playoff. He was named as the Korn Ferry Tour Rookie of the Year for the 2023 season.

On 19 June 2025, Dumont de Chassart shot a 11-under par 59 in the opening round of the Blue Cross and Blue Shield of Kansas Wichita Open at Crestview Country Club. It was the 14th sub-60 round in Korn Ferry Tour history.

== Amateur wins ==
- 2015 King's Prize
- 2017 French International Boys Championship, Grand Prix AFG, Belgian International Amateur Championship (incorporating the Belgian National Amateur Stroke Play Championship), Belgian National Junior U18 Championship, Belgian International U18 Amateur Championship, European Men's Club Trophy
- 2018 Grand Prix AFG
- 2019 Tar Heel Intercollegiate, Big Ten Championship
- 2020 Golfweek Purdue Amateur
- 2022 Boilermaker Invitational
- 2023 Fighting Illini Spring Collegiate

== Professional wins (2) ==
=== Korn Ferry Tour wins (2) ===
Legend
Finals events (1)
Other Korn Ferry Tour (1)

No.	Date	Tournament	Winning score	Margin of victory	Runner-up
1	11 Jun 2023	BMW Charity Pro-Am	−21 (66-67-66-65=264)	Playoff	(United States) Josh Teater
2	5 Oct 2025	Compliance Solutions Championship	−33 (61-61-64-65=251)	7 strokes	(China) Dou Zecheng

Korn Ferry Tour playoff record (1–1)

No.	Year	Tournament	Opponent(s)	Result
1	2023	BMW Charity Pro-Am	(United States) Josh Teater	Won with par on first extra hole
2	2023	Blue Cross and Blue Shield of Kansas Wichita Open	(United States) Ricky Castillo, (United States) Kyle Jones	Castillo won with par on first extra hole

== Results in major championships ==
Tournament	2022	2023	2024	2025	2026
Masters Tournament					
PGA Championship					
U.S. Open	CUT				T53
The Open Championship					

Did not play

CUT = missed the half-way cut
"T" = tied

== Team appearances ==
- European Boys' Team Championship (representing Belgium): 2015, 2016, 2017, 2018
- European Amateur Team Championship (representing Belgium): 2017, 2019, 2021
- Jacques Léglise Trophy (representing Continent of Europe): 2017 (winners)
- Eisenhower Trophy (representing Belgium): 2018, 2022
- Arnold Palmer Cup (representing International team): 2021, 2022 (winners)

== See also ==
- 2023 Korn Ferry Tour graduates
- 2025 Korn Ferry Tour graduates
