= Scott Gutschewski =

American professional golfer (born 1976)

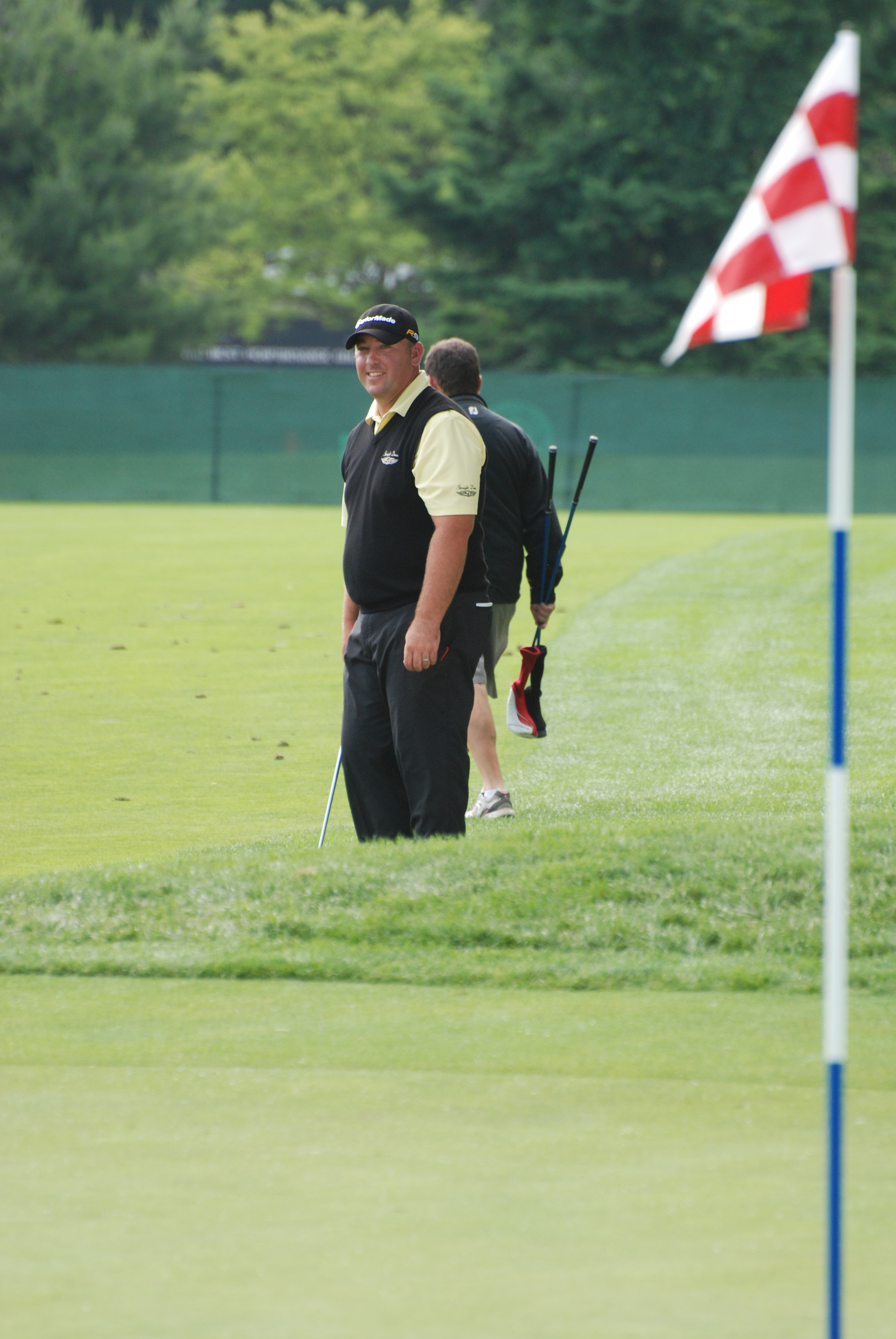
- Gutschewski at the 2009 U.S. Open

Personal information
- Nationality: United States
- Born: October 1, 1976 (age 50) Omaha, Nebraska, U.S.
- Height: 6 ft 0 in (1.83 m)
- Weight: 260 lb (120 kg; 19 st)

Career
- Sport: Golf
- College: Creighton University; University of Nebraska
- Turned professional: 1999
- Current tour: Korn Ferry Tour
- Former tours: PGA Tour; Canadian Tour
- Professional wins: 3

Number of wins by tour
- Korn Ferry Tour: 3

Best results in major championships
- Masters Tournament: DNP
- PGA Championship: DNP
- U.S. Open: CUT: 2009
- The Open Championship: T74: 2005

Scott Gutschewski (born October 1, 1976) is an American professional golfer who currently plays on the Korn Ferry Tour, where he has won three times. He previously played on the PGA Tour.

== Amateur career ==
In 1976, Gutschewski was born in Omaha, Nebraska. He played college golf at both Creighton University and the University of Nebraska. In 1999, Gutschewski helped lead the Huskers to a 14th-place finish at the NCAA Championships while he was a senior year.

== Professional career ==
In 1999, Gutschewski turned professional. He began his career on the Tight Lies Tour, Prairie Tour, NGA Hooters Tour, and the Canadian Tour. In 2003, he joined the Nationwide Tour and finished in 26th on the money list in his rookie season. He picked up his first professional win at the Monterey Peninsula Classic. He finished in 17th on the Nationwide Tour's money list in 2004 and which earned him his PGA Tour card for 2005.

In his rookie season on the PGA Tour, Gutschewski finished 149th on the money list to retain partial status on tour for 2006. His performance in 2006 was not good enough to retain his tour card. However, in 2006 he earned his card at 2006 PGA Tour Qualifying School. Gutschewski had another poor season in 2007 but this time he was not able to retain his card through qualifying school. He returned to the Nationwide Tour in 2008 and picked up his second professional victory at the Rex Hospital Open. The victory helped him finish in 21st on the tour's money list, earning his PGA Tour card for 2009. He lost his tour card after finishing outside the top 150 and went back to the Nationwide Tour for 2010. He finished the year 20th on the money list and earned his 2011 PGA Tour card.

After the 2011 season, Gutschewski battled injury and took some time away from playing. He considered a future in coaching collegiate golf, and even joined the coaching staff for the Creighton University Men's Golf Team in 2012 while undergoing rehab for his injured foot. In 2021, a decade removed from last earning a PGA Tour card, Gutschewski finished within the top 25 at the Korn Ferry Tour Finals and earned his PGA Tour card once again for the 2021–22 season.

At the 2022 Barracuda Championship, Gutschewski carded his best PGA Tour finish to date – 5th alone with +35 points (the Barracuda Championship utilizes the Modified Stableford Scoring system).

== Professional wins (3) ==
=== Korn Ferry Tour wins (3) ===
No.	Date	Tournament	Winning score	Margin of victory	Runner(s)-up
1	Oct 5, 2003	Monterey Peninsula Classic	−12 (68-69-67-72=276)	4 strokes	(United States) Michael Allen, (United States) Rich Barcelo, (United States) Zach Johnson
2	Jun 8, 2008	Rex Hospital Open	−14 (67-69-68-66=270)	2 strokes	(United States) Chad Ginn, (Mexico) Esteban Toledo
3	Apr 23, 2023	LECOM Suncoast Classic	−21 (67-66-62-68=263)	Playoff	(United States) Logan McAllister

Korn Ferry Tour playoff record (1–0)

No.	Year	Tournament	Opponent	Result
1	2023	LECOM Suncoast Classic	(United States) Logan McAllister	Won with birdie on first extra hole

== Results in major championships ==
Tournament	2005	2006	2007	2008	2009
U.S. Open					CUT
The Open Championship	T74				

Did not play

CUT = missed the half-way cut
"T" = tied
Note: Gutschewski never played in the Masters Tournament or the PGA Championship.

== See also ==
- 2004 Nationwide Tour graduates
- 2006 PGA Tour Qualifying School graduates
- 2008 Nationwide Tour graduates
- 2010 Nationwide Tour graduates
- 2021 Korn Ferry Tour Finals graduates
- 2023 Korn Ferry Tour graduates
