= Tommy Morrison (golfer) =

American professional golfer (born 2004)

Personal information
- Full name: Thomas Morrison
- Nationality: United States
- Born: August 11, 2004 (age 22) Maryland, U.S.
- Height: 6 ft 9 in (206 cm)

Career
- Sport: Golf
- College: University of Texas at Austin
- Turned professional: 2026
- Current tour: PGA Tour
- Former tour: Korn Ferry Tour
- Professional wins: 1

Number of wins by tour
- Korn Ferry Tour: 1

Best results in major championships
- Masters Tournament: DNP
- PGA Championship: DNP
- U.S. Open: DNP
- The Open Championship: T60: 2024

Achievements and awards
- Korn Ferry Tour Rookie of the Year: 2026

Thomas Morrison (born August 11, 2004) is an American professional golfer who plays on the PGA Tour. During his time at the University of Texas at Austin, he won the European Amateur in 2024 and represented the United States at the 2025 Walker Cup. Morrison turned professional in June 2026 and won his first tournament on the Korn Ferry Tour the following month.

== Early life and amateur career ==
Morrison was born in Maryland to Alison (née Skrenta) and James Morrison, on August 11, 2004. He was born with pulmonary valve stenosis, a heart disorder, and was admitted to Mount Sinai Hospital in New York for surgery when he was two weeks old. Morrison's mother and father were both tall, at 5 ft 11 in (1.80 m) and 6 ft 5 in (1.96 m), respectively. Alison worked at a cosmetics company and James was an attorney; neither had a background in golf.

After receiving his first golf club at age three from his grandfather, Morrison learned the game at Nissequogue Golf Club in Long Island. He attended Mater Dei School in Bethesda, Maryland, and began to receive coaching from instructor Bernie Najar of Caves Valley Golf Club at age nine. Morrison won the boys' 12-division at the U.S. Kids World Championship in 2017, and reached a height of 6 ft 8 in (2.03 m) by the age of 14.

Morrison's family split time between Potomac, Maryland and Pinehurst, North Carolina to advance his golf development. His brothers, Jack and Mac, also played golf. In 2019, Morrison moved with his family to Dallas, Texas, where he attended Hebron High School. Alongside golf, he played other sports such as basketball, football, lacrosse, and soccer during his youth. Morrison recalled in 2025: "I think there were a couple afternoons where I had to go from the golf course to basketball practice. I didn't want to leave the golf course, and my mom just kind of knew that I wanted to play golf, so she let me do that."

Morrison won the Southern Junior Championship in 2020. He was runner-up at the 2022 North and South Amateur, losing in a playoff to Luke Clanton. Morrison had committed to play collegiate golf at Duke University, but de-committed after his family moved to Texas. He instead committed to the University of Texas at Austin. He was ranked by Golf Channel among the top ten recruits of the 2023 class. Playing for the Texas Longhorns, he competed in seven events in his freshman season and had a scoring average of 71.50. He competed in all 14 of the Longhorns' tournaments in his sophomore season, recording a scoring average of 71.73. In June 2024, Morrison won the European Amateur, making him the first American to win the event. The victory also earned him an exemption to the 2024 Open Championship, where he made the cut and finished tied-60th.

In February 2025, Morrison won his first individual collegiate title at the Amer Ari Invitational. He shot 21-under 195 and broke the Longhorns record for lowest 54-hole total, previously held by Doug Ghim's 196 at the 2018 NCAA Raleigh Regional. Morrison received a sponsor exemption on the PGA Tour at the CJ Cup Byron Nelson in May 2025, where he missed the cut. He ended his junior season with a 70.15 scoring average and was named as a second-team All-American. Morrison represented the United States at the 2025 Walker Cup, where he had a 2–1 record as the United States won by a score of 17–9. Morrison's peak ranking in the World Amateur Golf Ranking was fifth.

== Professional career ==
Morrison finished sixth in the PGA Tour University rankings for 2026, which earned him status on the Korn Ferry Tour. In his professional debut, he finished tied-10th at the OccuNet Classic. He followed this with a tie for fifth at the Memorial Health Championship and a runner-up finish at The Blue Championship. In his fourth start as a professional, Morrison closed with an 8-under 63 to win the Evans Scholars Invitational on July 26, 2026. His 72-hole total of 29-under 255 broke the tournament record. The next week, Morrison shot 21-under 259 to tie for first and enter a five-man playoff at the Utah Championship. He lost to a birdie by Derek Hitchner on the first playoff hole. Morrison ended the 2026 Korn Ferry Tour season at No. 10 on the points list, inside the top-20 cutoff for promotion to the PGA Tour.

== Amateur wins ==
- 2020 Southern Junior Championship
- 2024 European Amateur
- 2025 Amer Ari Invitational

== Professional wins (1) ==
=== Korn Ferry Tour wins (1) ===
No.	Date	Tournament	Winning score	Margin of victory	Runner-up
1	Jul 26, 2026	Evans Scholars Invitational	−29 (65-63-64-63=255)	3 strokes	(United States) Dylan Menante

Korn Ferry Tour playoff record (0–1)

No.	Year	Tournament	Opponents	Result
1	2026	Utah Championship	(United States) Mason Andersen, (United States) Cole Hammer, (United States) Derek Hitchner, (United States) Travis Trace	Hitchner won with birdie on first extra hole

== Results in major championships ==
Tournament	2024	2025	2026
Masters Tournament			
PGA Championship			
U.S. Open			
The Open Championship	T60		

Did not play

"T" = tied

== U.S. national team appearances ==
- Walker Cup: 2025 (winners)

== See also ==
- 2026 Korn Ferry Tour graduates
