= 2026 Korn Ferry Tour =

Golf tour season

2026 Korn Ferry Tour season
- Duration: January 11, 2026 – October 11, 2026
- Number of official events: 25
- Most wins: (United States) Ian Holt (2) (Mexico) Álvaro Ortiz (2) (United States) Doc Redman (2) (Scotland) Sandy Scott (2) (United States) Ross Steelman (2)
- Points list: (United States) Ross Steelman
- Player of the Year: (United States) Ross Steelman
- Rookie of the Year: (United States) Tommy Morrison

The 2026 Korn Ferry Tour was the 36th season of the Korn Ferry Tour, the official development tour to the PGA Tour.

== Schedule ==
The following table lists official events during the 2026 season.

Date	Tournament	Location	Purse (US$)	Winner (Note: The number in parentheses after each winner's name is the number of Korn Ferry Tour events they had won up to and including that tournament. This information is only shown for Korn Ferry Tour members. It is rare for someone to accumulate many wins on the Korn Ferry Tour as success at this level usually leads to promotion to the PGA Tour.)	OWGR points	Notes
Jan 14	The Bahamas Golf Classic	Bahamas	1,000,000	(United States) Taylor Dickson (3)	14.61	
Jan 21	The Bahamas Great Abaco Classic	Bahamas	1,000,000	(United States) Ian Holt (1)	14.19	
Feb 1	Panama Championship	Panama	1,000,000	(United States) Ian Holt (2)	15.61	
Feb 8	Astara Golf Championship	Colombia	1,000,000	(United States) James Nicholas (1)	15.55	
Mar 1	Visa Argentina Open	Argentina	1,000,000	(United States) Alistair Docherty (1)	15.34	
Mar 8	Astara Chile Classic	Chile	1,000,000	(United States) Doc Redman (1)	13.60	
Mar 29	Club Car Championship	Georgia	1,000,000	(United States) Davis Lamb (1)	17.16	
Apr 5	LECOM Suncoast Classic	Florida	1,000,000	(France) Jérémy Gandon (2)	16.80	
Apr 19	Tulum Championship	Mexico	1,000,000	(United States) Dylan Menante (1)	16.15	
May 17	Colonial Life Charity Classic	South Carolina	1,000,000	(United States) Cole Sherwood (1)	16.08	New tournament
May 24	Visit Knoxville Open	Tennessee	1,000,000	(United States) Doc Redman (2)	13.18	
May 31	UNC Health Championship	North Carolina	1,000,000	(Mexico) Álvaro Ortiz (1)	14.71	
Jun 7	BMW Charity Pro-Am	South Carolina	1,000,000	(United States) Ben Kohles (5)	15.12	Pro-Am
Jun 14	OccuNet Classic	Texas	1,000,000	(United States) Zack Fischer (1)	12.31	New tournament
Jun 28	Memorial Health Championship	Illinois	1,000,000	(Canada) Drew Nesbitt (1)	14.85	
Jul 12	The Blue Championship	Colorado	1,000,000	(United States) Ross Steelman (1)	14.19	
Jul 26	Evans Scholars Invitational	Illinois	1,000,000	(United States) Tommy Morrison (1)	15.58	
Aug 2	Utah Championship	Utah	1,000,000	(United States) Derek Hitchner (1)	16.44	
Aug 9	Pinnacle Bank Championship	Nebraska	1,000,000	(United States) Frankie Harris (1)	17.04	
Aug 16	Albertsons Boise Open	Idaho	1,000,000	(United States) Ross Steelman (2)	16.25	
Aug 23	AdventHealth Championship	Missouri	1,000,000	(Japan) Yuta Sugiura (1)	17.77	
Sep 13	Simmons Bank Open	Tennessee	1,500,000	(Mexico) Álvaro Ortiz (2)	17.55	Finals event
Sep 20	Nationwide Children's Hospital Championship	Ohio	1,500,000	(Scotland) Sandy Scott (1)	13.81	Finals event
Oct 4	Compliance Solutions Championship	Oklahoma	1,500,000	(Scotland) Sandy Scott (2)	12.52	Finals event
Oct 11	Korn Ferry Tour Championship	Virginia	1,500,000	(United States) Austin Hitt (1)	12.55	Finals event

== Points list ==
The points list was based on tournament results during the season, calculated using a points-based system. The top 20 players on the points list earned status to play on the 2027 PGA Tour.

Position	Player	Points
1	(United States) Ross Steelman	2,221
2	(Scotland) Sandy Scott	2,191
3	(United States) Ian Holt	1,618
4	(United States) Alistair Docherty	1,580
5	(Mexico) Álvaro Ortiz	1,533

== Awards ==
Award	Winner	Ref.
Player of the Year (Jack Nicklaus Trophy)	(United States) Ross Steelman	
Rookie of the Year	(United States) Tommy Morrison	
