= Sandy Scott (golfer) =

Scottish professional golfer (born 1998)

Personal information
- Nationality: Scotland
- Born: 28 June 1998 (age 28) Inverness, Scotland
- Height: 5 ft 10 in (1.78 m)
- Spouse: Amy Taylor (m. 2025)

Career
- Sport: Golf
- College: Texas Tech University
- Turned professional: 2022
- Current tour: PGA Tour
- Former tours: Korn Ferry Tour; PGA Tour Americas; PGA Tour Latinoamérica
- Professional wins: 2
- Highest ranking: 87 (4 October 2026) (as of 8 November 2026)

Number of wins by tour
- Korn Ferry Tour: 2

Best results in major championships
- Masters Tournament: DNP
- PGA Championship: DNP
- U.S. Open: CUT: 2020
- The Open Championship: DNP

Sandy Scott (born 28 June 1998) is a Scottish professional golfer. A former Walker Cup player who competed in college golf for Texas Tech University, he won two Korn Ferry Tour Finals events in 2026, the Nationwide Children's Hospital Championship and the Compliance Solutions Championship, and finished second on the Korn Ferry Tour points list to earn membership of the PGA Tour for 2027.

== Amateur career ==
Scott was born in Inverness and grew up in Nairn, where he learned the game at Nairn Golf Club. In 2015 he won the Scottish Boys' Open, succeeding Ewen Ferguson as champion, and played for Great Britain and Ireland in the Jacques Léglise Trophy. In 2016 he was part of the Scotland team that retained the European Amateur Team Championship, beating Sweden in the final.

Scott played six seasons for the Texas Tech Red Raiders from 2016 to 2022. He won the El Macero Classic as a junior and the Carmel Cup at Pebble Beach in 2019, and was twice named an All-American. He represented Scotland at the 2018 Eisenhower Trophy, and in 2019 he played for the International team that won the Arnold Palmer Cup.

Scott was selected for the Great Britain and Ireland team for the 2019 Walker Cup at Royal Liverpool Golf Club, becoming the first golfer from the north of Scotland chosen for the match since 1975. The United States won 15.5–10.5, but Scott was the home side's leading scorer with 2.5 points from four matches, including singles wins over Andy Ogletree and Brandon Wu. He reached the round of 32 of the U.S. Amateur in 2019 and 2020. His sixth place in the World Amateur Golf Ranking earned him a place in the 2020 U.S. Open at Winged Foot, the first Texas Tech player to qualify while still competing for the university; he missed the cut with rounds of 75 and 74.

Scott had hand and wrist problems during the autumn 2020 college season and underwent exploratory surgery in January 2021. He was selected for the 2021 Walker Cup at Seminole Golf Club as Great Britain and Ireland's highest-ranked player, but withdrew in April because of the injury and was replaced by Jack Dyer. He had torn ligaments in his right wrist, which required two surgeries, and went 17 months between 2020 and 2022 without picking up a club. He took a medical redshirt and returned to Texas Tech for an additional season.

== Professional career ==
Scott turned professional in 2022 after missing the cut at that year's U.S. Amateur. Later that year he earned a card for PGA Tour Latinoamérica through one of the circuit's qualifying tournaments, and in 2023 he finished 14th on its Order of Merit. In 2024, on PGA Tour Americas, he made 12 cuts in 15 events with five top-10 finishes. A closing 66 at the season-ending Fortinet Cup Championship at TPC Toronto gave him second place, one stroke behind Will Cannon, and moved him to eighth on the points list, earning him Korn Ferry Tour status for 2025. As a Korn Ferry Tour rookie in 2025 he finished 55th on the points list.

Scott finished third at the Tulum Championship in April 2026. His wrist injury recurred in the summer and kept him out for about two months, and he was 36th on the points list before the regular-season finale in Kansas City, where he tied for fourth. After finishing second at the Simmons Bank Open, he won the Nationwide Children's Hospital Championship in Columbus, Ohio, the second of four Korn Ferry Tour Finals events, on 20 September. He started the final round four strokes behind and shot 65 to win by one stroke from John Marshall Butler. His 18-under-par total of 266 was a tournament record, and the win lifted him from 13th to second on the points list, guaranteeing a PGA Tour card for 2027.

Two weeks later Scott won the third Finals event, the Compliance Solutions Championship at The Patriot Golf Club in Owasso, Oklahoma. He and William Sides finished 72 holes at 24 under par, and Scott won with an 18-foot birdie putt on the fourth hole of a sudden-death playoff. He became the second player of the season, after Ian Holt, to win consecutive Korn Ferry Tour events, and moved to first on the points list. The win took him to 87th in the Official World Golf Ranking. He finished tied for 43rd at the season-ending Korn Ferry Tour Championship and ended the season second on the points list, behind Ross Steelman.

== Personal life ==
Scott is married to Amy Taylor, a professional golfer on the Ladies European Tour; they met at Texas Tech and married in December 2025.

== Professional wins (2) ==
=== Korn Ferry Tour wins (2) ===
Legend
Finals events (2)
Other Korn Ferry Tour (0)

No.	Date	Tournament	Winning score	Margin of victory	Runner-up
1	20 Sep 2026	Nationwide Children's Hospital Championship	−18 (69-64-68-65=266)	1 stroke	(United States) John Marshall Butler
2	4 Oct 2026	Compliance Solutions Championship	−24 (61-64-67-64=256)	Playoff	(United States) William Sides

Korn Ferry Tour playoff record (1–0)

No.	Year	Tournament	Opponent	Result
1	2026	Compliance Solutions Championship	(United States) William Sides	Won with birdie on fourth extra hole

== Results in major championships ==
Tournament	2020
U.S. Open	CUT

CUT = missed the halfway cut

== Team appearances ==
Amateur

- Jacques Léglise Trophy (representing Great Britain and Ireland): 2015 (tied, trophy retained)
- European Amateur Team Championship (representing Scotland): 2016 (winners), 2018, 2019
- Eisenhower Trophy (representing Scotland): 2018
- Arnold Palmer Cup (representing the International team): 2019 (winners)
- Walker Cup (representing Great Britain and Ireland): 2019
