= NV5 Invitational =

Evans Scholars Invitational
Tournament information
- Location: Glenview, Illinois
- Established: 2019
- Course: The Glen Club
- Par: 71
- Length: 7,257 yards (6,636 m)
- Tour: Korn Ferry Tour
- Format: Stroke play
- Prize fund: US$1,000,000
- Month played: July

Tournament record score
- Aggregate: 255 Tommy Morrison (2026)
- To par: −29 as above

Current champion
- (United States) Tommy Morrison

Location map
- Location in the United States Location in Illinois

The Evans Scholars Invitational (formerly known as the NV5 Invitational) is a golf tournament on the Korn Ferry Tour. It was first played in May 2019 at The Glen Club in Glenview, Illinois. As part of COVID-19-related schedule changes to the Korn Ferry Tour season, the tournament was postponed to September 2020, and the location was changed to Chicago Highlands Club. In 2021 the tournament returned to May and to The Glen Club.

Proceeds from the tournament benefit the Evans Scholars Foundation, which provides tuition and housing scholarships to caddies. In 2021, NV5 Geospatial Solutions agreed a five-year partnership as title sponsor for the event, after which the tournament was renamed the NV5 Invitational presented by Old National Bank.

== Winners ==
Year	Winner	Score	To par	Margin of victory	Runner(s)-up
Evans Scholars Invitational
2026	(United States) Tommy Morrison	255	−29	3 strokes	(United States) Dylan Menante
NV5 Invitational
2025	(United States) Johnny Keefer	258	−26	2 strokes	(United States) Jeffrey Kang
2024	(Germany) Thomas Rosenmüller	259	−25	2 strokes	(Australia) Karl Vilips
2023	(United States) Trace Crowe	259	−25	Playoff	(United States) Patrick Fishburn
2022	(England) Harry Hall	262	−22	Playoff	(United States) Nick Hardy
Evans Scholars Invitational
2021	(United States) Cameron Young	266	−18	5 strokes	(Canada) Adam Svensson
2020	(United States) Curtis Thompson	271	−17	1 stroke	(United States) Jimmy Stanger (United States) Will Zalatoris
2019	(United States) Scottie Scheffler	271	−17	Playoff	(Colombia) Marcelo Rozo
