= 2025 Korn Ferry Tour =

Golf tour season

2025 Korn Ferry Tour season
- Duration: January 12, 2025 – October 12, 2025
- Number of official events: 26
- Most wins: (United States) Chandler Blanchet (2) (United States) Johnny Keefer (2) (United States) Neal Shipley (2) (United States) Austin Smotherman (2)
- Points list: (United States) Johnny Keefer
- Player of the Year: (United States) Johnny Keefer
- Rookie of the Year: (United States) Johnny Keefer

The 2025 Korn Ferry Tour was the 35th season of the Korn Ferry Tour, the official development tour to the PGA Tour.

== Changes for 2025 ==
As part of changes to the PGA Tour's exemption system announced in November 2024, the number of cards available for Korn Ferry Tour graduates was reduced from 30 to 20, with all 20 graduates receiving fully-exempt status on the PGA Tour for the following season.

== Schedule ==
The following table lists official events during the 2025 season.

Date	Tournament	Location	Purse (US$)	Winner (Note: The number in parentheses after each winner's name is the number of Korn Ferry Tour events they had won up to and including that tournament. This information is only shown for Korn Ferry Tour members. It is rare for someone to accumulate many wins on the Korn Ferry Tour as success at this level usually leads to promotion to the PGA Tour.)	OWGR points	Notes
Jan 15	The Bahamas Golf Classic	Bahamas	1,000,000	(United States) Hank Lebioda (1)	14.03	
Jan 22	The Bahamas Great Abaco Classic	Bahamas	1,000,000	(Canada) Sudarshan Yellamaraju (1)	13.64	
Feb 2	Panama Championship	Panama	1,000,000	(United States) Josh Teater (2)	14.30	
Feb 9	Astara Golf Championship	Colombia	1,000,000	(United States) Kyle Westmoreland (1)	15.48	
Mar 2	Visa Argentina Open	Argentina	1,000,000	(United States) Justin Suh (2)	14.42	
Mar 9	Astara Chile Classic	Chile	1,000,000	(United States) Logan McAllister (1)	13.16	
Apr 6	Club Car Championship	Georgia	1,000,000	(France) Jérémy Gandon (1)	15.72	
Apr 19	LECOM Suncoast Classic	Florida	1,000,000	(United States) Neal Shipley (1)	14.62	
Apr 27	Veritex Bank Championship	Texas	1,000,000	(United States) Johnny Keefer (1)	14.44	
May 4	Tulum Championship	Mexico	1,000,000	(United States) Bryson Nimmer (1)	14.35	New tournament
May 18	AdventHealth Championship	Missouri	1,000,000	(South Korea) Kim Seong-hyeon (1)	15.42	
May 25	Visit Knoxville Open	Tennessee	1,000,000	(Sweden) Pontus Nyholm (1)	15.66	
Jun 1	UNC Health Championship	North Carolina	1,000,000	(United States) Trace Crowe (2)	17.07	
Jun 8	BMW Charity Pro-Am	South Carolina	1,000,000	(United States) Austin Smotherman (2)	14.88	Pro-Am
Jun 22	Blue Cross and Blue Shield of Kansas Wichita Open	Kansas	1,000,000	(Canada) Myles Creighton (1)	16.33	
Jun 29	Memorial Health Championship	Illinois	1,000,000	(United States) Austin Smotherman (3)	15.44	
Jul 13	The Ascendant	Colorado	1,000,000	(United States) Neal Shipley (2)	15.57	
Jul 20	Price Cutter Charity Championship	Missouri	1,000,000	(United States) Chandler Blanchet (1)	15.04	
Jul 27	NV5 Invitational	Illinois	1,000,000	(United States) Johnny Keefer (2)	16.03	
Aug 3	Utah Championship	Utah	1,000,000	(United States) Julian Suri (1)	14.51	
Aug 10	Pinnacle Bank Championship	Nebraska	1,000,000	(South Africa) Christo Lamprecht (1)	17.71	
Aug 17	Albertsons Boise Open	Idaho	1,000,000	(Mexico) Emilio González (1)	17.85	
Sep 14	Simmons Bank Open	Tennessee	1,500,000	(United States) Zach Bauchou (1)	15.43	Finals event
Sep 21	Nationwide Children's Hospital Championship	Ohio	1,500,000	(United States) John VanDerLaan (1)	16.10	Finals event
Oct 5	Compliance Solutions Championship	Oklahoma	1,500,000	(Belgium) Adrien Dumont de Chassart (2)	13.78	Finals event
Oct 12	Korn Ferry Tour Championship	Indiana	1,500,000	(United States) Chandler Blanchet (2)	13.28	Finals event

== Points list ==
The points list was based on tournament results during the season, calculated using a points-based system. The top 20 players on the points list earned status to play on the 2026 PGA Tour.

Position	Player	Points
1	(United States) Johnny Keefer	2,359
2	(United States) Chandler Blanchet	1,972
3	(United States) Austin Smotherman	1,883
4	(United States) Neal Shipley	1,808
5	(Mexico) Emilio González	1,607

== Awards ==
Award	Winner	Ref.
Player of the Year (Jack Nicklaus Trophy)	(United States) Johnny Keefer	
Rookie of the Year	(United States) Johnny Keefer	
