= Korn Ferry Tour =

Professional men's golf tour

- Current season, competition or edition: 2026 Korn Ferry Tour
- Formerly: Ben Hogan Tour (1990–1992); Nike Tour (1993–1999); Buy.com Tour (2000–2002); Nationwide Tour (2003–2012); Web.com Tour (2012–2019)
- Sport: Golf
- Founded: 1989
- Founder: PGA Tour
- First season: 1990
- Countries: Based in the United States (Note: Schedules have also included events in Argentina, Australia, the Bahamas, Brazil, Canada, Chile, Colombia, Mexico, New Zealand and Panama.)
- Most titles: Tournament wins: (United States) Jason Gore (7)
- Related competitions: PGA Tour; PGA Tour Americas; PGA Tour Canada; PGA Tour China; PGA Tour Latinoamérica
- Website: kornferrytour.com

The Korn Ferry Tour is the developmental tour for the U.S.-based PGA Tour, and features professional golfers who have either not yet reached the PGA Tour, or who have done so but then failed to win enough FedEx Cup points to stay at that level. Those who finish in the top 20 of the money list at year's end are given PGA Tour memberships for the next season. Since the 2019 season, the Korn Ferry Tour has been the primary pathway for those seeking to earn their PGA Tour card. Q-School, which had previously been the primary route for qualification to the PGA Tour, has been converted as an entryway to the Korn Ferry Tour.

== History ==
Announced in early 1989 by PGA Tour commissioner Deane Beman, the "satellite tour" was formalized by the PGA Tour in 1990, originally named the Ben Hogan Tour, sponsored by the Ben Hogan Golf Company. Hogan's company intended to spend $15 million for the tour's first three seasons. "It's very important for me to re-pay my dues," said the aging Hogan.

The first season of 1990 had 30 events, and the typical event purse was $100,000. The fields were intended to consist of 132 golfers. Late in 1992, Nike acquired the title sponsorship and it became the Nike Tour for seven seasons (1993–1999). Buy.com was the next title sponsor with the tour being titled the Buy.com Tour for three seasons (2000–2002).

Nationwide Insurance became the tour's next title sponsors for the start of the 2003 season, with the tour being renamed the Nationwide Tour. After 9 1/2 seasons as the Nationwide Tour, Web.com was announced as the new title sponsor in late June 2012. The 10-year sponsorship deal was effective immediately, and the tour's name was changed to the Web.com Tour mid-season. In June 2019, the PGA Tour announced a 10-year deal with Los Angeles–based consulting firm Korn Ferry to replace Web.com as the tour's sponsor.

The vast majority of tournaments have always been hosted within the mainland United States. In 1993 the tour reached beyond those boundaries for the first time, with the Monterrey Open in Mexico. It was an annual fixture on the tour schedule until 2001. The following season, the tour added PGA Tour of Australasia co-sanctioned events in Australia and New Zealand, and the Canadian PGA Championship in Canada. A tournament in Panama was added in 2004, and the tour returned to Mexico in 2008. The tour has also visited Colombia (since 2010), Chile (2012–2015), Brazil (2013–2016), the Dominican Republic (2016–2017) and the Bahamas (since 2017).

== Rules and results ==
All Korn Ferry Tour tournaments operate similarly to typical PGA Tour tournaments in that they are all 72-hole stroke play events with a cut made after 36 holes. The cut on the Korn Ferry Tour is for the top 65 players and ties, which is the same as the PGA Tour. The fields are usually 144 or 156 players, depending on time of year (and available daylight hours). As with the PGA Tour, the winner of the tournament will get a prize of 18% of the total purse.

Since this tour is a developmental tour, players are usually vying to play well enough to gain status on the PGA Tour.

Until 2012, there were a number of ways of getting onto the Korn Ferry Tour: Top 50 golfers at qualifying school after the top 25 and ties, those who finished between 26th and 60th on the previous year's money list, 126–150th on the previous season's PGA Tour money list, and those who were formerly fully exempt on the PGA Tour in the recent past. Those without status can also earn enough to exceed 100th on the previous season's money list and earned unlimited exemptions for the remainder of the season. Around 14 open qualifying spots are given during the Monday of tournament week, and those who finished in the top 25 of a Korn Ferry event are automatically exempt into the next tournament. If a Monday morning qualifier wins an event, they will earn full-exempt status for the remainder of the season. Past PGA Tour winners aged 48 and 49 can play on the Korn Ferry Tour on an increased basis to prepare themselves for PGA Tour Champions, while former PGA Tour winners with limited status use the Korn Ferry Tour as a way to get back to the main tour.

In 2007 Paul Claxton became the first man to reach US$1 million in Korn Ferry Tour career earnings.

The Korn Ferry Tour offers Official World Golf Ranking (OWGR) points. From 2006 until August 2022, when the OWGR points system changed, the winner earned a minimum of 14 points (provided at least 54 holes were played) and 20 for the Korn Ferry Tour Championship. Starting in 2013, the other events of the Korn Ferry Tour Finals awarded 16 points to the winner. Tournaments shortened to 36 holes were given reduced values of ten points for regular season events and the win is considered unofficial. With the change in the OWGR system, there are no minimum points for any tour. In 2023, the winner's points ranged from 10.14 to 15.31, averaging 13.05. In 2024, the winner's points ranged from 11.08 to 14.63, averaging 13.13.

=== Three-win promotion ===
Since 1997, a player who wins three tournaments in one year on the Korn Ferry Tour receives an immediate promotion to the PGA Tour for the remainder of the year and for the following year. This "performance promotion" (sometimes informally referred to as a "battlefield promotion") has occurred 13 times:

- 1997: (United States) Chris Smith
- 2001: (United States) Heath Slocum, (United States) Chad Campbell, (United States) Pat Bates
- 2002: (United States) Patrick Moore
- 2003: (United States) Tom Carter
- 2005: (United States) Jason Gore
- 2007: (Australia) Nick Flanagan
- 2009: (Australia) Michael Sim
- 2014: (Mexico) Carlos Ortiz
- 2016: (United States) Wesley Bryan
- 2020–21: (Chile) Mito Pereira
- 2024: (United States) Matt McCarty

== Changes for 2013 season and beyond ==
On March 20, 2012, the PGA Tour announced radical changes to the main tour's season and qualifying process effective in 2013. Major changes to what was then known as the Nationwide Tour were also announced at that time. Full details of these changes were announced on July 10 of that year.

The first major change was that beginning in fall 2013, the PGA Tour season started in October of the previous calendar year. This change had several consequences for the Korn Ferry Tour, either directly or indirectly.

Starting with the 2013 season, the Korn Ferry Tour has a structure similar to that of the main PGA Tour, with a regular season followed by a season-ending series of tournaments. In the case of the Korn Ferry Tour, the ending series consists of four tournaments, to be held during the main tour's FedEx Cup playoffs, called the Korn Ferry Tour Finals. At least 150 players will be eligible to compete in the Finals—the top 75 on the Korn Ferry Tour regular-season money list, plus the players finishing between 126 and 200 on the FedEx Cup points list. Non-members of the PGA Tour are also eligible if they would have earned enough FedEx Cup points to finish 126 to 200. In addition, PGA Tour players who have been granted medical extensions for the following season are eligible. Because some of the PGA Tour players will be exempt by other means, such as tournament wins in the previous two years, the Finals fields will not consist of all eligible players. A total of 50 PGA Tour cards for the following season will be awarded at the end of the Finals—25 to the top regular-season money winners on the Korn Ferry Tour, with the remaining 25 determined by total money earned during the Finals.

Those who finish in the Top 60 on the points list but fail to earn PGA Tour cards retain full Korn Ferry Tour status, along with those who finished 101–150 on the PGA Tour FedEx Cup standings. Conditional status is given to those who finish in the top 100 on the money list or 151–200 in the FedEx Cup.

From 2013 to 2022, the PGA Tour Qualifying Tournament was replaced by the Korn Ferry Tour Qualifying Tournament which granted playing rights only for the Korn Ferry Tour. In 2023, the Qualifying Tournament again awarded PGA Tour cards, this time to the top five plus ties. Those up to 40th plus ties are fully exempt on the Korn Ferry Tour. The next twenty are fully exempt on PGA Tour Americas and conditionally on the Korn Ferry Tour. All others who reach the final stage are conditionally exempt on both the PGA Tour Americas and Korn Ferry Tour.

Finally, the Korn Ferry Tour now provides up to two entrants in the following year's Players Championship. One invitation is extended to the player who tops the money list for the entire season, including the Finals. The golfer who earns the most during the Finals also receives an invitation; if the same player leads both money lists, only one invitation is given.

== Money and points list winners ==
Season	Points list	Points				
2026	(United States) Ross Steelman	2,221				
2025	(United States) Johnny Keefer	2,359				
2024	(United States) Matt McCarty	2,703				
2023	(United States) Ben Kohles	1,893				
Season	Regular season points list	Points	Finals points list	Points	Overall points list	Points
2022	(China) Yuan Yechun	1,819	(United States) Justin Suh	1,167	(United States) Justin Suh	2,312
2020–21	(Germany) Stephan Jäger	2,804	(United States) Joseph Bramlett	1,139	(Germany) Stephan Jäger	3,524
2019	(China) Zhang Xinjun	1,962	(United States) Scottie Scheffler	1,268	(United States) Scottie Scheffler	2,935
Season	Regular season money list	Prize money ($)	Finals money list	Prize money ($)	Overall money list	Prize money ($)
2018	(South Korea) Im Sung-jae	534,326	(United States) Denny McCarthy	255,793	(South Korea) Im Sung-jae	553,800
2017	(United States) Brice Garnett	368,761	(United States) Chesson Hadley	298,125	(United States) Chesson Hadley	562,475
2016	(United States) Wesley Bryan	449,392	(United States) Grayson Murray	248,000	(United States) Wesley Bryan	449,392
2015	(United States) Patton Kizzire	518,240	(United States) Chez Reavie	323,066	(United States) Patton Kizzire	567,865
2014	(Mexico) Carlos Ortiz	515,403	(United States) Derek Fathauer	250,133	(Canada) Adam Hadwin	529,792
2013	(United States) Michael Putnam	450,184	(United States) John Peterson	230,000	(United States) Chesson Hadley	535,432
Season	Money list	Prize money ($)				
2012	(United States) Casey Wittenberg	433,453				
2011	(United States) J. J. Killeen	414,273				
2010	(United States) Jamie Lovemark	452,951				
2009	(Australia) Michael Sim	644,142				
2008	(United States) Matt Bettencourt	447,863				
2007	(Wales) Richard Johnson	445,421				
2006	(United States) Ken Duke	382,443				
2005	(United States) Troy Matteson	495,009				
2004	(United States) Jimmy Walker	371,346				
2003	(United States) Zach Johnson	494,882				
2002	(United States) Patrick Moore	381,965				
2001	(United States) Chad Campbell	394,552				
2000	(United States) Spike McRoy	300,638				
1999	(United States) Carl Paulson	223,051				
1998	(United States) Bob Burns	178,664				
1997	(United States) Chris Smith	225,201				
1996	(United States) Stewart Cink	251,699				
1995	(United States) Jerry Kelly	188,878				
1994	(United States) Chris Perry	167,148				
1993	(United States) Sean Murphy	166,293				
1992	(United States) John Flannery	164,115				
1991	(United States) Tom Lehman	141,934				
1990	(United States) Jeff Maggert	108,644				

== Awards ==
Season	Player of the Year	Rookie of the Year
2026	(United States) Ross Steelman	(United States) Tommy Morrison
2025	(United States) Johnny Keefer	(United States) Johnny Keefer
2024	(United States) Matt McCarty	(Australia) Karl Vilips
2023	(United States) Ben Kohles	(Belgium) Adrien Dumont de Chassart
2022	(United States) Justin Suh	(South Korea) Kim Seong-hyeon
2020–21	(Germany) Stephan Jäger	(United States) Greyson Sigg
2019	(United States) Scottie Scheffler	(United States) Scottie Scheffler
2018	(South Korea) Im Sung-jae	(South Korea) Im Sung-jae
2017	(United States) Chesson Hadley	No award
2016	(United States) Wesley Bryan	No award
2015	(United States) Patton Kizzire	No award
2014	(Mexico) Carlos Ortiz	No award
2013	(United States) Michael Putnam	No award
2012	(United States) Casey Wittenberg	No award
2011	(United States) J. J. Killeen	No award
2010	(United States) Jamie Lovemark	No award
2009	(Australia) Michael Sim	No award
2008	(Zimbabwe) Brendon de Jonge	No award
2007	(Australia) Nick Flanagan	No award
2006	(United States) Ken Duke	No award
2005	(United States) Jason Gore	No award
2004	(United States) Jimmy Walker	No award
2003	(United States) Zach Johnson	No award
2002	(United States) Patrick Moore	No award
2001	(United States) Chad Campbell	No award
2000	(United States) Spike McRoy	No award
1999	(United States) Carl Paulson	No award
1998	(United States) Bob Burns	No award
1997	(United States) Chris Smith	No award
1996	(United States) Stewart Cink	No award
1995	(United States) Jerry Kelly	No award
1994	(United States) Chris Perry	No award
1993	(United States) Sean Murphy	No award
1992	(United States) John Flannery	No award
1991	(United States) Tom Lehman	No award
1990	(United States) Jeff Maggert	No award

== Career money leaders ==
The table shows top-10 career money leaders on the Korn Ferry Tour as of the 2026 season. Players in bold were 2026 Korn Ferry Tour members.

Rank	Player	Prize money ($)
1	(United States) Darron Stiles	2,121,641
2	(United States) **Ben Kohles**	2,094,023
3	(United States) **Scott Gutschewski**	1,911,212
4	(United States) Kyle Thompson	1,890,864
5	(Argentina) **Fabián Gómez**	1,880,705
6	(United States) Paul Claxton	1,802,290
7	(United States) Jason Gore	1,745,845
8	(United States) **Rob Oppenheim**	1,734,001
9	(United States) Jeff Gove	1,702,910
10	(United States) **Josh Teater**	1,613,397

There is a full list on the PGA Tour's website.

== See also ==
- List of golfers with most Korn Ferry Tour wins
- Professional golf tours
- Challenge Tour – the analogous tour in Europe operated by the PGA European Tour
- Epson Tour – the analogous tour in North American women's golf, operated by the LPGA
- Minor League Golf Tour
