= List of 2019 PGA Tour card holders =

Players earn their tour membership either by winning tournaments, placing highly in the FedEx Cup rankings, promotion from the Web.com Tour, medical exemption, or via one time exemptions for reaching milestones.

For the 2019 season, 2016 Masters winner Danny Willett returned after concentrating on the European Tour in the previous season. Other notable joiners apart from Web.com Tour graduates include Joaquín Niemann and Kiradech Aphibarnrat. Among those to lose their full PGA Tour membership was 2010 U.S. Open champion Graeme McDowell, but he subsequently regained full membership on April 1, 2019 after winning the Corales Puntacana Resort and Club Championship.

== List of members ==
Players below are listed by their current priority ranking for entry into PGA Tour tournaments, which can change several ways during the course of a season. Players highlighted in pink are competing on medical extensions, during which they must earn a specified number of FedEx Points or else risk losing their status in the middle of the season. A player who wins a tournament is elevated to category 9 or higher, depending on the tournament's prestige. Categories 25/26/27 and 29 are re-ordered five times throughout the season based on FedEx Cup points earned.

=== Full members ===
| # | Player | Qualifying criteria | 2018 FedEx Cup position |
|---|---|---|---|
| 1 | (Australia) Jason Day | Winner of PGA Championship or U.S. Open in the last five seasons | 16 |
| 1 | (United States) Dustin Johnson | Winner of PGA Championship or U.S. Open in the last five seasons | 4 |
| 1 | (Germany) Martin Kaymer | Winner of PGA Championship or U.S. Open in the last five seasons | 213 |
| 1 | (United States) Brooks Koepka | Winner of PGA Championship or U.S. Open in the last five seasons | 9 |
| 1 | (Northern Ireland) Rory McIlroy | Winner of PGA Championship or U.S. Open in the last five seasons | 13 |
| 1 | (United States) Jordan Spieth | Winner of PGA Championship or U.S. Open in the last five seasons | 31 |
| 1 | (United States) Justin Thomas | Winner of PGA Championship or U.S. Open in the last five seasons | 7 |
| 1 | (United States) Jimmy Walker | Winner of PGA Championship or U.S. Open in the last five seasons | 75 |
| 1 | (United States) Gary Woodland | Began the season in category 9, upgraded after winning the 2019 U.S. Open | 26 |
| 2 | (United States) Rickie Fowler | Winner of The Players Championship in the last five seasons | 17 |
| 2 | (South Korea) Si Woo Kim | Winner of The Players Championship in the last five seasons | 55 |
| 2 | (United States) Webb Simpson | Winner of The Players Championship in the last five seasons | 11 |
| 3 | (Spain) Sergio García | Winner of the Masters Tournament in the last five seasons | 128 |
| 3 | (United States) Patrick Reed | Winner of the Masters Tournament in the last five seasons | 22 |
| 3 | (United States) Bubba Watson | Winner of the Masters Tournament in the last five seasons | 10 |
| 3 | (England) Danny Willett | Winner of the Masters Tournament in the last five seasons | |
| 3 | (United States) Tiger Woods | Began the season in category 5, upgraded after winning the 2019 Masters Tournament | 2 |
| 4 | (United States) Zach Johnson | Winner of The Open Championship in the last five seasons | 58 |
| 4 | (Republic of Ireland) Shane Lowry | Began the season in category 29 (conditional member), upgraded after winning the 2019 Open Championship | 140 |
| 4 | (Italy) Francesco Molinari | Winner of The Open Championship in the last five seasons | 17 |
| 4 | (Sweden) Henrik Stenson | Winner of The Open Championship in the last five seasons | 57 |
| 5 | (United States) Xander Schauffele | Winner of The Tour Championship in the last three seasons | 15 |
| 6 | (United States) Kevin Kisner | Began the season in category 9, upgraded after winning the 2019 WGC-Dell Technologies Match Play | 47 |
| 6 | (Scotland) Russell Knox | Winner of World Golf Championships events in the last three seasons | 89 |
| 6 | (United States) Phil Mickelson | Winner of World Golf Championships events in the last three seasons | 21 |
| 6 | (England) Justin Rose | Winner of World Golf Championships events in the last three seasons | 1 |
| 6 | (Australia) Adam Scott | Winner of World Golf Championships events in the last three seasons | 51 |
| 6 | (Japan) Hideki Matsuyama | Winner of World Golf Championships events in the last three seasons | 13 |
| 6 | (United States) Patrick Cantlay | Began the season in Category 9, upgraded after winning the 2019 Memorial Tournament | 20 |
| 6 | (United States) Bryson DeChambeau | Winner of the Arnold Palmer Invitational or the Memorial Tournament in the last three seasons | 3 |
| 6 | (United States) Jason Dufner | Winner of the Arnold Palmer Invitational or the Memorial Tournament in the last three seasons | 100 |
| 6 | (Australia) Marc Leishman | Winner of the Arnold Palmer Invitational or the Memorial Tournament in the last three seasons | 29 |
| 6 | (United States) William McGirt | Winner of the Arnold Palmer Invitational or the Memorial Tournament in the last three seasons | 116 |
| 7 | (United States) Billy Horschel | Leader from the final FedEx Cup points list in the last five seasons | 5 |
| 9 | (United States) Ryan Armour | PGA Tour official tournament winner in the last two seasons, plus a season of exemption for each additional win, up to five seasons | 49 |
| 9 | (United States) Daniel Berger | PGA Tour official tournament winner in the last two seasons, plus a season of exemption for each additional win, up to five seasons | 70 |
| 9 | (Sweden) Jonas Blixt | PGA Tour official tournament winner in the last two seasons, plus a season of exemption for each additional win, up to five seasons | 173 |
| 9 | (United States) Keegan Bradley | PGA Tour official tournament winner in the last two seasons, plus a season of exemption for each additional win, up to five seasons | 8 |
| 9 | (United States) Wesley Bryan | PGA Tour official tournament winner in the last two seasons, plus a season of exemption for each additional win, up to five seasons | 163 |
| 9 | (England) Paul Casey | PGA Tour official tournament winner in the last two seasons, plus a season of exemption for each additional win, up to five seasons | 25 |
| 9 | (United States) Cameron Champ | Began the season in category 25, upgraded after winning the 2018 Sanderson Farms Championship | |
| 9 | (United States) Kevin Chappell | PGA Tour official tournament winner in the last two seasons, plus a season of exemption for each additional win, up to five seasons | 83 |
| 9 | (Canada) Corey Conners | Began the season in category 29 (conditional member), upgraded after winning the 2019 Valero Texas Open | 130 |
| 9 | (United States) Austin Cook | PGA Tour official tournament winner in the last two seasons, plus a season of exemption for each additional win, up to five seasons | 38 |
| 9 | (South Africa) Dylan Frittelli | Began the season in category 25, upgraded after winning the 2019 John Deere Classic | |
| 9 | (United States) Brice Garnett | PGA Tour official tournament winner in the last two seasons, plus a season of exemption for each additional win, up to five seasons | 61 |
| 9 | (United States) Cody Gribble | PGA Tour official tournament winner in the last two seasons, plus a season of exemption for each additional win, up to five seasons | 182 |
| 9 | (Canada) Adam Hadwin | PGA Tour official tournament winner in the last two seasons, plus a season of exemption for each additional win, up to five seasons | 36 |
| 9 | (United States) Brian Harman | PGA Tour official tournament winner in the last two seasons, plus a season of exemption for each additional win, up to five seasons | 48 |
| 9 | (United States) Russell Henley | PGA Tour official tournament winner in the last two seasons, plus a season of exemption for each additional win, up to five seasons | 96 |
| 9 | (United States) Jim Herman | Began the season in category 21, then dropped to 34, upgraded after winning the 2019 Barbasol Championship | 233 |
| 9 | (United States) Max Homa | Began the season in category 25, upgraded after winning the 2019 Wells Fargo Championship | |
| 9 | (United States) Charles Howell III | Began the season in category 19, upgraded after winning the 2018 RSM Classic | 53 |
| 9 | (Canada) Mackenzie Hughes | PGA Tour official tournament winner in the last two seasons, plus a season of exemption for each additional win, up to five seasons | 160 |
| 9 | (United States) Kang Sung-hoon | Began the season in category 19, upgraded after winning the 2019 AT&T Byron Nelson | 111 |
| 9 | (United States) Michael Kim | PGA Tour official tournament winner in the last two seasons, plus a season of exemption for each additional win, up to five seasons | 81 |
| 9 | (United States) Patton Kizzire | PGA Tour official tournament winner in the last two seasons, plus a season of exemption for each additional win, up to five seasons | 30 |
| 9 | (Japan) Satoshi Kodaira | PGA Tour official tournament winner in the last two seasons, plus a season of exemption for each additional win, up to five seasons | 94 |
| 9 | (United States) Matt Kuchar | PGA Tour official tournament winner in the last two seasons, plus a season of exemption for each additional win, up to five seasons | 76 |
| 9 | (United States) Andrew Landry | PGA Tour official tournament winner in the last two seasons, plus a season of exemption for each additional win, up to five seasons | 37 |
| 9 | (United States) Nate Lashley | Began the season in category 28, then dropped to 29, upgraded after winning the 2019 Rocket Mortgage Classic | 172 |
| 9 | (United States) Adam Long | Began the season in category 25, upgraded after winning the 2019 Desert Classic | |
| 9 | (Northern Ireland) Graeme McDowell | Began the season in category 29 (conditional member), upgraded after winning the 2019 Corales Puntacana Resort and Club Championship | 144 |
| 9 | (United States) Troy Merritt | PGA Tour official tournament winner in the last two seasons, plus a season of exemption for each additional win, up to five seasons | 91 |
| 9 | (United States) Keith Mitchell | Began the season in category 19, upgraded after winning the 2019 Honda Classic | 67 |
| 9 | (United States) Collin Morikawa | Began season as an amateur, gained special temporary membership before winning the 2019 Barracuda Championship | |
| 9 | (United States) Grayson Murray | PGA Tour official tournament winner in the last two seasons, plus a season of exemption for each additional win, up to five seasons | 119 |
| 9 | (United States) Kevin Na | PGA Tour official tournament winner in the last two seasons, plus a season of exemption for each additional win, up to five seasons | 28 |
| 9 | (United States) Ryan Palmer | Began the season in category 19, upgraded after winning the 2019 Zurich Classic of New Orleans | 63 |
| 9 | (Australia) Rod Pampling | PGA Tour official tournament winner in the last two seasons, plus a season of exemption for each additional win, up to five seasons | 203 |
| 9 | (Taiwan) Pan Cheng-tsung | Began the season in category 19, upgraded after winning the 2019 RBC Heritage | 35 |
| 9 | (United States) Pat Perez | PGA Tour official tournament winner in the last two seasons, plus a season of exemption for each additional win, up to five seasons | 39 |
| 9 | (United States) Scott Piercy | PGA Tour official tournament winner in the last two seasons, plus a season of exemption for each additional win, up to five seasons | 68 |
| 9 | (United States) D. A. Points | PGA Tour official tournament winner in the last two seasons, plus a season of exemption for each additional win, up to five seasons | 176 |
| 9 | (United States) J. T. Poston | Began the season in category 19, upgraded after winning the 2019 Wyndham Championship | 117 |
| 9 | (United States) Ted Potter Jr. | PGA Tour official tournament winner in the last two seasons, plus a season of exemption for each additional win, up to five seasons | 65 |
| 9 | (England) Ian Poulter | PGA Tour official tournament winner in the last two seasons, plus a season of exemption for each additional win, up to five seasons | 50 |
| 9 | (United States) Andrew Putnam | PGA Tour official tournament winner in the last two seasons, plus a season of exemption for each additional win, up to five seasons | 33 |
| 9 | (Spain) Jon Rahm | PGA Tour official tournament winner in the last two seasons, plus a season of exemption for each additional win, up to five seasons | 23 |
| 9 | (United States) Chez Reavie | Began the season in category 19, upgraded after winning the 2019 Travelers Championship | 34 |
| 9 | (Australia) Cameron Smith | PGA Tour official tournament winner in the last two seasons, plus a season of exemption for each additional win, up to five seasons | 12 |
| 9 | (United States) Brandt Snedeker | PGA Tour official tournament winner in the last two seasons, plus a season of exemption for each additional win, up to five seasons | 40 |
| 9 | (United States) Kyle Stanley | PGA Tour official tournament winner in the last two seasons, plus a season of exemption for each additional win, up to five seasons | 27 |
| 9 | (United States) Brendan Steele | PGA Tour official tournament winner in the last two seasons, plus a season of exemption for each additional win, up to five seasons | 56 |
| 9 | (United States) Chris Stroud | PGA Tour official tournament winner in the last two seasons, plus a season of exemption for each additional win, up to five seasons | 155 |
| 9 | (United States) Hudson Swafford | PGA Tour official tournament winner in the last two seasons, plus a season of exemption for each additional win, up to five seasons | 156 |
| 9 | (United States) Martin Trainer | Began the season in category 25, upgraded after winning the 2019 Puerto Rico Open | |
| 9 | (United States) Kevin Tway | Began the season in category 19, upgraded after winning the 2018 Safeway Open | 87 |
| 9 | (Venezuela) Jhonattan Vegas | PGA Tour official tournament winner in the last two seasons, plus a season of exemption for each additional win, up to five seasons | 95 |
| 9 | (United States) Aaron Wise | PGA Tour official tournament winner in the last two seasons, plus a season of exemption for each additional win, up to five seasons | 24 |
| 9 | (United States) Matthew Wolff | Began season as an amateur, gained special temporary membership before winning the 2019 3M Open | |
| 11 | (South Africa) Tim Clark | In the top 50 in career earnings as of the end of the preceding season and using one-time exemption | no starts |
| 11 | (South Africa) Ernie Els | In the top 50 in career earnings as of the end of the preceding season and using one-time exemption | 209 |
| 11 | (Republic of Ireland) Pádraig Harrington | In the top 50 in career earnings as of the end of the preceding season and using one-time exemption | |
| 11 | (United States) Kenny Perry | In the top 50 in career earnings as of the end of the preceding season and using one-time exemption | |
| 11 | (United States) Bo Van Pelt | In the top 50 in career earnings as of the end of the preceding season and using one-time exemption | no starts |
| 11 | (United States) Steve Stricker | In the top 25 in career earnings as of the end of the preceding season and using one-time exemption | 145 |
| 18 | (United States) Davis Love III | Life Members (been active members of the PGA Tour for 15 years and have won at least 20 co-sponsored events). | 210 |
| 18 | (Fiji) Vijay Singh | Life Members (been active members of the PGA Tour for 15 years and have won at least 20 co-sponsored events). | 226 |
| 19 | (United States) Tony Finau | Top 125 on the previous season's FedEx Cup points list | 6 |
| 19 | (England) Tommy Fleetwood | Top 125 on the previous season's FedEx Cup points list | 19 |
| 19 | (Argentina) Emiliano Grillo | Top 125 on the previous season's FedEx Cup points list | 32 |
| 19 | (Spain) Rafa Cabrera-Bello | Top 125 on the previous season's FedEx Cup points list | 41 |
| 19 | (South Korea) An Byeong-hun | Top 125 on the previous season's FedEx Cup points list | 42 |
| 19 | (Sweden) Alex Norén | Top 125 on the previous season's FedEx Cup points list | 43 |
| 19 | (United States) Chesson Hadley | Top 125 on the previous season's FedEx Cup points list | 44 |
| 19 | (United States) Luke List | Top 125 on the previous season's FedEx Cup points list | 45 |
| 19 | (United States) Beau Hossler | Top 125 on the previous season's FedEx Cup points list | 46 |
| 19 | (United States) Jason Kokrak | Top 125 on the previous season's FedEx Cup points list | 52 |
| 19 | (England) Tyrrell Hatton | Top 125 on the previous season's FedEx Cup points list | 54 |
| 19 | (United States) Brian Gay | Top 125 on the previous season's FedEx Cup points list | 59 |
| 19 | (Mexico) Abraham Ancer | Top 125 on the previous season's FedEx Cup points list | 60 |
| 19 | (United States) J. J. Spaun | Top 125 on the previous season's FedEx Cup points list | 62 |
| 19 | (United States) Peter Uihlein | Top 125 on the previous season's FedEx Cup points list | 64 |
| 19 | (United States) Chris Kirk | Top 125 on the previous season's FedEx Cup points list | 66 |
| 19 | (South Africa) Louis Oosthuizen | Top 125 on the previous season's FedEx Cup points list | 69 |
| 19 | (United States) Ryan Moore | Top 125 on the previous season's FedEx Cup points list | 71 |
| 19 | (South Korea) Whee Kim | Top 125 on the previous season's FedEx Cup points list | 72 |
| 19 | (United States) Stewart Cink | Top 125 on the previous season's FedEx Cup points list | 73 |
| 19 | (United States) Nick Watney | Top 125 on the previous season's FedEx Cup points list | 74 |
| 19 | (United States) Kevin Streelman | Top 125 on the previous season's FedEx Cup points list | 77 |
| 19 | (United States) Bronson Burgoon | Top 125 on the previous season's FedEx Cup points list | 78 |
| 19 | (United States) Charley Hoffman | Top 125 on the previous season's FedEx Cup points list | 79 |
| 19 | (United States) Joel Dahmen | Top 125 on the previous season's FedEx Cup points list | 80 |
| 19 | (United States) J. B. Holmes | Top 125 on the previous season's FedEx Cup points list | 82 |
| 19 | (United States) James Hahn | Top 125 on the previous season's FedEx Cup points list | 84 |
| 19 | (United States) Jamie Lovemark | Top 125 on the previous season's FedEx Cup points list | 85 |
| 19 | (United States) Brian Stuard | Top 125 on the previous season's FedEx Cup points list | 86 |
| 19 | (South Africa) Branden Grace | Top 125 on the previous season's FedEx Cup points list | 88 |
| 19 | (United States) Kelly Kraft | Top 125 on the previous season's FedEx Cup points list | 90 |
| 19 | (United States) Tom Hoge | Top 125 on the previous season's FedEx Cup points list | 92 |
| 19 | (United States) Scott Stallings | Top 125 on the previous season's FedEx Cup points list | 93 |
| 19 | (New Zealand) Danny Lee | Top 125 on the previous season's FedEx Cup points list | 97 |
| 19 | (United States) Ollie Schniederjans | Top 125 on the previous season's FedEx Cup points list | 98 |
| 19 | (India) Anirban Lahiri | Top 125 on the previous season's FedEx Cup points list | 99 |
| 19 | (United States) Sam Ryder | Top 125 on the previous season's FedEx Cup points list | 101 |
| 19 | (United States) Trey Mullinax | Top 125 on the previous season's FedEx Cup points list | 102 |
| 19 | (United States) Brandon Harkins | Top 125 on the previous season's FedEx Cup points list | 103 |
| 19 | (United States) Patrick Rodgers | Top 125 on the previous season's FedEx Cup points list | 104 |
| 19 | (South Africa) Charl Schwartzel | Top 125 on the previous season's FedEx Cup points list | 105 |
| 19 | (United States) Sean O'Hair | Top 125 on the previous season's FedEx Cup points list | 106 |
| 19 | (United States) Harold Varner III | Top 125 on the previous season's FedEx Cup points list | 107 |
| 19 | (Germany) Alex Čejka | Top 125 on the previous season's FedEx Cup points list | 108 |
| 19 | (Slovakia) Rory Sabbatini | Top 125 on the previous season's FedEx Cup points list | 109 |
| 19 | (United States) Richy Werenski | Top 125 on the previous season's FedEx Cup points list | 110 |
| 19 | (United States) John Huh | Top 125 on the previous season's FedEx Cup points list | 112 |
| 19 | (United States) Tyler Duncan | Top 125 on the previous season's FedEx Cup points list | 113 |
| 19 | (Republic of Ireland) Séamus Power | Top 125 on the previous season's FedEx Cup points list | 114 |
| 19 | (Scotland) Martin Laird | Top 125 on the previous season's FedEx Cup points list | 115 |
| 19 | (United States) Vaughn Taylor | Top 125 on the previous season's FedEx Cup points list | 118 |
| 19 | (United States) Sam Saunders | Top 125 on the previous season's FedEx Cup points list | 120 |
| 19 | (United States) Ryan Blaum | Top 125 on the previous season's FedEx Cup points list | 121 |
| 19 | (United States) Scott Brown | Top 125 on the previous season's FedEx Cup points list | 122 |
| 19 | (Canada) Nick Taylor | Top 125 on the previous season's FedEx Cup points list | 123 |
| 19 | (United States) Bud Cauley | Top 125 on the previous season's FedEx Cup points list | 124 |
| 19 | (United States) Harris English | Top 125 on the previous season's FedEx Cup points list | 125 |
| 20 | (Chile) Joaquín Niemann | Non-member with more regular-season FedEx Cup points than the 125th-placed player | |
| 20 | (Thailand) Kiradech Aphibarnrat | Non-member with more regular-season FedEx Cup points than the 125th-placed player | |
| 21 | (United States) Lucas Glover | Began the season in category 25, upgraded upon meeting minor medical extension top 125 requirement (53 points in 8 starts) | 135 |
| 21 | (United States) Kevin Stadler | Major Medical Extension | no starts |
| 21 | (Canada) Graham DeLaet | Major Medical Extension | 187 |
| 21 | (England) Luke Donald | Major Medical Extension | 214 |
| 21 | (United States) Ben Martin | Began the season in category 28, upgraded by the commissioner | 150 |
| 21 | (United States) Morgan Hoffmann | Major Medical Extension | 198 |
| 21 | (Colombia) Camilo Villegas | Major Medical Extension | 193 |
| 21 | (South Korea) Noh Seung-yul | Major Medical Extension | 229 |
| 21 | (South Korea) K. J. Choi | Major Medical Extension | 188 |
| 21 | (United States) Brandon Hagy | Major Medical Extension | 215 |
| 21 | (United States) Briny Baird | Major Medical Extension | no starts |
| 21 | (United States) Colt Knost | Major Medical Extension | 232 |
| 21 | (United States) Harrison Frazar | Major Medical Extension | no starts |
| 21 | (Australia) Greg Chalmers | Began the season in category 28, upgraded by the commissioner | 184 |
| 22 | (South Korea) Im Sung-jae | Money leader on the Web.com Tour | |
| 22 | (United States) Denny McCarthy | Money leader in the Web.com Tour Finals | 149 |
| 25 | (United States) Michael Thompson | Top 25 in Web.com Tour regular season money list | 142 |
| 25 | (United States) Adam Schenk | Top 25 not already exempt in the Web.com Tour Finals | 157 |
| 25 | (United States) Sam Burns | Top 25 in Web.com Tour regular season money list | |
| 25 | (United States) Wyndham Clark | Top 25 in Web.com Tour regular season money list | |
| 25 | (South Korea) Lee Kyoung-hoon | Top 25 in Web.com Tour regular season money list | |
| 25 | (United States) Cameron Tringale | Top 25 not already exempt in the Web.com Tour Finals | 195 |
| 25 | (Canada) Roger Sloan | Top 25 not already exempt in the Web.com Tour Finals | |
| 25 | (United States) Peter Malnati | Top 25 not already exempt in the Web.com Tour Finals | 161 |
| 25 | (Mexico) Carlos Ortiz | Top 25 in Web.com Tour regular season money list | |
| 25 | (Australia) Matt Jones | Top 25 not already exempt in the Web.com Tour Finals | 151 |
| 25 | (United States) Shawn Stefani | Top 25 not already exempt in the Web.com Tour Finals | 147 |
| 25 | (United States) Wes Roach | Top 25 not already exempt in the Web.com Tour Finals | |
| 25 | (Colombia) Sebastián Muñoz | Top 25 in Web.com Tour regular season money list | |
| 25 | (United States) Hank Lebioda | Top 25 in Web.com Tour regular season money list | |
| 25 | (United States) Roberto Castro | Top 25 in Web.com Tour regular season money list | |
| 25 | (United States) Robert Streb | Top 25 not already exempt in the Web.com Tour Finals | 178 |
| 25 | (Austria) Sepp Straka | Top 25 not already exempt in the Web.com Tour Finals | |
| 25 | (United States) Scott Langley | Top 25 in Web.com Tour regular season money list | |
| 25 | (Germany) Stephan Jäger | Top 25 not already exempt in the Web.com Tour Finals | 165 |
| 25 | (United States) Kramer Hickok | Top 25 in Web.com Tour regular season money list | |
| 25 | (United States) Jim Knous | Top 25 not already exempt in the Web.com Tour Finals | |
| 25 | (United States) Chase Wright | Top 25 in Web.com Tour regular season money list | |
| 25 | (United States) Joey Garber | Top 25 in Web.com Tour regular season money list | |
| 25 | (Mexico) Roberto Díaz | Top 25 not already exempt in the Web.com Tour Finals | 189 |
| 25 | (United States) Alex Prugh | Top 25 in Web.com Tour regular season money list | |
| 25 | (Canada) Adam Svensson | Top 25 in Web.com Tour regular season money list | |
| 25 | (Australia) Curtis Luck | Top 25 not already exempt in the Web.com Tour Finals | |
| 25 | (Argentina) Julián Etulain | Top 25 in Web.com Tour regular season money list | |
| 25 | (Australia) Cameron Davis | Top 25 not already exempt in the Web.com Tour Finals | |
| 25 | (United States) Anders Albertson | Top 25 in Web.com Tour regular season money list | |
| 25 | (Mexico) José de Jesús Rodríguez | Top 25 in Web.com Tour regular season money list | |
| 25 | (Argentina) Fabián Gómez | Top 25 not already exempt in the Web.com Tour Finals | 162 |
| 25 | (United States) Hunter Mahan | Top 25 not already exempt in the Web.com Tour Finals | 159 |
| 25 | (Canada) Ben Silverman | Top 25 not already exempt in the Web.com Tour Finals | 136 |
| 25 | (United States) Josh Teater | Top 25 in Web.com Tour regular season money list | |
| 25 | (United States) Seth Reeves | Top 25 not already exempt in the Web.com Tour Finals | |
| 25 | (United States) Brady Schnell | Top 25 in Web.com Tour regular season money list | |
| 25 | (United States) Nicholas Lindheim | Top 25 not already exempt in the Web.com Tour Finals | 146 |
| 26 | (United States) J. J. Henry | At least 300 PGA Tour career cuts made, as of the end of the preceding season and using one-time exemption | 158 |
| 25 | (South Korea) Bae Sang-moon | Began the season in category 21, failed to meet extension top 125 requirement (295 points in 10 starts) | 202 |
| 25 | (United States) Kyle Jones | Top 25 in Web.com Tour regular season money list | |
| 25 | (United States) Chris Thompson | Top 25 not already exempt in the Web.com Tour Finals | |
| 25 | (United States) John Chin | Top 25 in Web.com Tour regular season money list | |
| 27 | (United States) Chad Collins | Major Medical Extension (Web.com Tour Category) | no starts |
| 27 | (United States) Will Claxton | Major Medical Extension (Web.com Tour Category) | 0 points |
| 27 | (United States) Lee Williams | Major Medical Extension (Web.com Tour Category) | no starts |
| 27 | (United States) David Berganio Jr. | Major Medical Extension (Web.com Tour Category) | 0 points |

=== Conditional members ===
| # | Player | Qualifying criteria | 2018 FedEx Cup position |
|---|---|---|---|
| 29 | (United States) Jim Furyk | Conditional member based upon finishing between 126th and 150th in the FedEx Cup standings | 141 |
| 29 | (United States) Talor Gooch | Conditional member based upon finishing between 126th and 150th in the FedEx Cup standings | 139 |
| 29 | (Australia) Aaron Baddeley | Conditional member based upon finishing between 126th and 150th in the FedEx Cup standings | 132 |
| 29 | (United States) Zack Sucher | Began the season in category 27, failed to meet extension top 125 requirement (347 points in 6 starts) | no starts |
| 29 | (United States) Bill Haas | Began the season in category 28, failed to meet extension top 125 requirement (115 points in 2 starts) | 152 |
| 29 | (United States) Dominic Bozzelli | Began the season in category 21, failed to meet extension top 125 requirement (187 points in 5 starts) | 169 |
| 29 | (United States) Johnson Wagner | Conditional member based upon finishing between 126th and 150th in the FedEx Cup standings | 133 |
| 29 | (Canada) David Hearn | Conditional member based upon finishing between 126th and 150th in the FedEx Cup standings | 138 |
| 29 | (United States) Ben Crane | Conditional member based upon finishing between 126th and 150th in the FedEx Cup standings | 148 |
| 29 | (United States) Martin Piller | Conditional member based upon finishing between 126th and 150th in the FedEx Cup standings | 126 |
| 29 | (United States) Tom Lovelady | Conditional member based upon finishing between 126th and 150th in the FedEx Cup standings | 134 |
| 29 | (United States) Derek Fathauer | Conditional member based upon finishing between 126th and 150th in the FedEx Cup standings | 137 |
| 29 | (South Africa) Tyrone van Aswegen | Conditional member based upon finishing between 126th and 150th in the FedEx Cup standings | 127 |
| 29 | (United States) Robert Garrigus | Conditional member based upon finishing between 126th and 150th in the FedEx Cup standings | 131 |
| 29 | (Sweden) David Lingmerth | Conditional member based upon finishing between 126th and 150th in the FedEx Cup standings | 143 |
| 29 | (United States) Chad Campbell | Conditional member based upon finishing between 126th and 150th in the FedEx Cup standings | 129 |
| 30 | (England) Greg Owen | Major Medical Extension (Conditional) | no starts |

=== Special temporary members, past champion members, and veteran members ===
The space below category 30 is occupied by special temporary members, past champion members, and veteran members. Players who have won at least one PGA Tour event are eligible for past champion membership, and players who have at least 150 made cuts on the PGA Tour are eligible for veteran membership. Any non-member who earns more FedEx Cup points than the 150th position in the 2018 FedEx Cup standings is eligible for special temporary membership. A special temporary member is still considered a non-member, but is eligible for unlimited sponsor exemptions.

Matt Fitzpatrick, Lucas Bjerregaard, and Doc Redman finished the season as special temporary members.

== New full members ==
Full members in the 2019 season who weren't full members in the 2018 season.

| Player | Qualifying criteria |
|---|---|
| (England) Danny Willett | Winner of the Masters Tournament in the last five seasons |
| (United States) Matthew Wolff | Joined tour after winning the 2019 3M Open |
| (Republic of Ireland) Pádraig Harrington | In the top 50 in career earnings as of the end of the preceding season and using one-time exemption |
| (United States) Kenny Perry | In the top 50 in career earnings as of the end of the preceding season and using one-time exemption |
| (United States) Trey Mullinax | Conditional PGA Tour member finishing in top 125 on the previous season's FedEx Cup points list |
| (United States) J. T. Poston | Conditional PGA Tour member finishing in top 125 on the previous season's FedEx Cup points list |
| (Chile) Joaquín Niemann | Non Member with equal or more regular season FedEx points than the 125th placed player |
| (Thailand) Kiradech Aphibarnrat | Non Member with equal or more regular season FedEx points than the 125th placed player |
| (South Korea) Im Sung-jae | Money Leader in the Web.com Tour |
| (United States) Denny McCarthy | Money Leader in the Web.com Tour Finals |
| (United States) Kramer Hickok | Top 25 in Web.com Tour regular season money list |
| (United States) Anders Albertson | Top 25 in Web.com Tour regular season money list |
| (United States) Sam Burns | Top 25 in Web.com Tour regular season money list |
| (United States) Scott Langley | Top 25 in Web.com Tour regular season money list |
| (Australia) Cameron Davis | Top 25 not already exempt in the Web.com Tour Finals |
| (United States) Cameron Champ | Top 25 in Web.com Tour regular season money list |
| (United States) Martin Trainer | Top 25 in Web.com Tour regular season money list |
| (South Korea) Lee Kyoung-hoon | Top 25 in Web.com Tour regular season money list |
| (United States) Chase Wright | Top 25 in Web.com Tour regular season money list |
| (United States) Hunter Mahan | Top 25 not already exempt in the Web.com Tour Finals |
| (Colombia) Sebastián Muñoz | Top 25 in Web.com Tour regular season money list |
| (Canada) Roger Sloan | Top 25 not already exempt in the Web.com Tour Finals |
| (United States) Kyle Jones | Top 25 in Web.com Tour regular season money list |
| (Canada) Adam Svensson | Top 25 in Web.com Tour regular season money list |
| (United States) Seth Reeves | Top 25 not already exempt in the Web.com Tour Finals |
| (United States) Alex Prugh | Top 25 in Web.com Tour regular season money list |
| (United States) Max Homa | Top 25 not already exempt in the Web.com Tour Finals |
| (United States) John Chin | Top 25 in Web.com Tour regular season money list |
| (Mexico) José de Jesús Rodríguez | Top 25 in Web.com Tour regular season money list |
| (United States) Josh Teater | Top 25 in Web.com Tour regular season money list |
| (Australia) Curtis Luck | Top 25 not already exempt in the Web.com Tour Finals |
| (United States) Wyndham Clark | Top 25 in Web.com Tour regular season money list |
| (South Africa) Dylan Frittelli | Top 25 not already exempt in the Web.com Tour Finals |
| (United States) Adam Long | Top 25 in Web.com Tour regular season money list |
| (United States) Wes Roach | Top 25 not already exempt in the Web.com Tour Finals |
| (Argentina) Julián Etulain | Top 25 in Web.com Tour regular season money list |
| (Austria) Sepp Straka | Top 25 not already exempt in the Web.com Tour Finals |
| (United States) Chris Thompson | Top 25 in Web.com Tour regular season money list |
| (United States) Joey Garber | Top 25 in Web.com Tour regular season money list |
| (United States) Brady Schnell | Top 25 in Web.com Tour regular season money list |
| (United States) Roberto Castro | Top 25 in Web.com Tour regular season money list |
| (United States) Hank Lebioda | Top 25 in Web.com Tour regular season money list |
| (United States) Jim Knous | Top 25 not already exempt in the Web.com Tour Finals |

== Ex-full members ==
Full members in the 2018 season who aren't full members in the 2019 season.

Many players who lose their full tour card meet the criteria for conditional membership, which means they rank behind full members in the priority ranking for PGA Tour tournament entry, but they may also enter via a sponsors exemption.

| Player | 2018 FedEx Cup position | New Status |
|---|---|---|
| (United States) Dominic Bozzelli | 169 | Began the season in category 21, failed to meet extension top 125 requirement (187 points in 5 starts), but met conditional member mark |
| (United States) Bill Haas | 152 | Began the season in category 28, failed to meet extension top 125 requirement (115 points in 2 starts), but met conditional member mark |
| (United States) Zack Sucher | no starts | Began the season in category 27, failed to meet extension top 125 requirement (347 points in 6 starts), but met conditional member mark |
| (United States) Martin Piller | 126 | Conditional member based upon finishing between 126th and 150th in the FedEx Cup standings |
| (South Africa) Tyrone van Aswegen | 127 | Conditional member based upon finishing between 126th and 150th in the FedEx Cup standings |
| (United States) Chad Campbell | 129 | Conditional member based upon finishing between 126th and 150th in the FedEx Cup standings |
| (United States) Robert Garrigus | 131 | Conditional member based upon finishing between 126th and 150th in the FedEx Cup standings |
| (Australia) Aaron Baddeley | 132 | Conditional member based upon finishing between 126th and 150th in the FedEx Cup standings |
| (United States) Tom Lovelady | 134 | Conditional member based upon finishing between 126th and 150th in the FedEx Cup standings |
| (United States) Derek Fathauer | 137 | Conditional member based upon finishing between 126th and 150th in the FedEx Cup standings |
| (United States) Talor Gooch | 139 | Conditional member based upon finishing between 126th and 150th in the FedEx Cup standings |
| (Sweden) David Lingmerth | 143 | Conditional member based upon finishing between 126th and 150th in the FedEx Cup standings |
| (South Africa) Retief Goosen | 153 | Past Champion, Team Tournament Winner or Veteran Member finishing outside top 150 in FedEx Cup standings |
| (United States) Matt Every | 186 | Past Champion, Team Tournament Winner or Veteran Member finishing outside top 150 in FedEx Cup standings |
| (United States) Jonathan Byrd | 181 | Past Champion, Team Tournament Winner or Veteran Member finishing outside top 150 in FedEx Cup standings |
| (United States) Billy Hurley III | 201 | Past Champion, Team Tournament Winner or Veteran Member finishing outside top 150 in FedEx Cup standings |
| (Australia) Geoff Ogilvy | 207 | Past Champion, Team Tournament Winner or Veteran Member finishing outside top 150 in FedEx Cup standings |
| (Australia) John Senden | 224 | Began the season in category 21, failed to meet extension top 125 requirement (285 points in 6 starts) and now has Past Champion status |
| (United States) Will MacKenzie | 0 points | Began the season in category 27, failed to meet extension top 125 requirement (238 points in 6 starts) and now has Past Champion status |
| (Sweden) Freddie Jacobson | no starts | Began the season in category 21, failed to meet extension top 125 requirement (333 points in 18 starts) and now has Past Champion status |
| (United States) Smylie Kaufman | 200 | Began the season in category 28, failed to meet extension top 125 requirement (304 points in 5 starts) and now has Past Champion status |
| (United States) Jonathan Randolph | 174 | Began the season in category 28, failed to meet extension top 125 requirement (211 points in 1 start) and now has no membership status |
| (United States) Steve Marino | 216 | Began the season in category 21, failed to meet extension top 125 requirement (284 points in 4 starts) and now has no membership status |
| (United States) Jon Curran | 0 points | Began the season in category 21, failed to meet extension top 125 requirement (305 points in 3 starts) and now has no membership status |
| (United States) Kris Blanks | 242 | Began the season in category 27, failed to meet extension top 125 requirement (341 points in 3 starts) and now has no membership status |
| (Belgium) Thomas Pieters | 154 | No membership status within the PGA Tour |
| (United States) Martin Flores | 164 | No membership status within the PGA Tour |
| (United States) Blayne Barber | 166 | No membership status within the PGA Tour |
| (China) Zhang Xinjun | 167 | No membership status within the PGA Tour |
| (United States) Lanto Griffin | 171 | No membership status within the PGA Tour |
| (United States) Ethan Tracy | 177 | No membership status within the PGA Tour |
| (United States) Brett Stegmaier | 179 | No membership status within the PGA Tour |
| (United States) Rob Oppenheim | 180 | No membership status within the PGA Tour |
| (United States) Steve Wheatcroft | 183 | No membership status within the PGA Tour |
| (England) Ross Fisher | 185 | No membership status within the PGA Tour |
| (United States) Conrad Shindler | 192 | No membership status within the PGA Tour |
| (United States) Matt Atkins | 211 | No membership status within the PGA Tour |
| (China) Dou Zecheng | 227 | No membership status within the PGA Tour |
| (United States) Andrew Yun | 231 | No membership status within the PGA Tour |
| (United States) Kyle Thompson | 236 | No membership status within the PGA Tour |
| (United States) Bob Estes | 238 | No membership status within the PGA Tour |
| (United States) Andrew Loupe | 0 points | No membership status within the PGA Tour |
| (United States) Shane Bertsch | 0 points | No membership status within the PGA Tour |
