= 2017 PGA Tour Canada =

Golf tour season

2017 PGA Tour Canada season
- Duration: June 1, 2017 – September 17, 2017
- Number of official events: 12
- Most wins: (United States) Kramer Hickok (2) (United States) Patrick Newcomb (2)
- Order of Merit: (United States) Kramer Hickok

The 2017 PGA Tour Canada, titled as the 2017 Mackenzie Tour-PGA Tour Canada for sponsorship reasons, was the 32nd season of the Canadian Tour, and the fifth under the operation and running of the PGA Tour.

== Schedule ==
The following table lists official events during the 2017 season.

Date	Tournament	Location	Purse (C$)	Winner (Note: The number in parentheses after each winner's name is the number of PGA Tour Canada events they had won up to and including that tournament. It is rare for someone to accumulate many wins on PGA Tour Canada as success at this level usually leads to promotion to the Web.com Tour.)	OWGR points
Jun 4	Freedom 55 Financial Open	British Columbia	175,000	(United States) Lee McCoy (1)	6
Jun 11	Bayview Place Cardtronics Open	British Columbia	175,000	(Germany) Max Rottluff (2)	6
Jun 18	GolfBC Championship	British Columbia	175,000	(United States) Robby Shelton (1)	6
Jul 9	The Players Cup	Manitoba	175,000	(United States) Kramer Hickok (1)	6
Jul 16	Staal Foundation Open	Ontario	175,000	(United States) Johnny Ruiz (1)	6
Jul 23	Mackenzie Investments Open	Quebec	175,000	(United States) Hank Lebioda (1)	6
Aug 6	Syncrude Oil Country Championship	Alberta	175,000	(United States) Patrick Newcomb (1)	6
Aug 13	ATB Financial Classic	Alberta	175,000	(United States) Chase Wright (1)	6
Aug 20	National Capital Open to Support Our Troops	Ontario	175,000	(United States) Mark Blakefield (1)	6
Sep 3	Cape Breton Open	Nova Scotia	175,000	(United States) Patrick Newcomb (2)	6
Sep 10	Ontario Championship	Ontario	175,000	(United States) Kramer Hickok (2)	6
Sep 17	Freedom 55 Financial Championship	Ontario	200,000	(United States) Rico Hoey (1)	6

=== Unofficial events ===
The following events were sanctioned by the PGA Tour Canada, but did not carry official money, nor were wins official.

Date	Tournament	Location	Purse (C$)	Winner	OWGR points
Dec 16	Aruba Cup	Aruba	US$120,000	PGA Tour Canada	n/a

== Order of Merit ==
The Order of Merit was based on prize money won during the season, calculated in Canadian dollars. The top five players on the Order of Merit earned status to play on the 2018 Web.com Tour.

Position	Player	Prize money (C$)
1	(United States) Kramer Hickok	122,502
2	(United States) Robby Shelton	90,293
3	(United States) Johnny Ruiz	83,157
4	(United States) Patrick Newcomb	82,824
5	(United States) Rico Hoey	75,435

== See also ==
- 2017 PGA Tour Latinoamérica
