= Alex Prugh =

American golfer (born 1984)

Personal information
- Full name: Alexander William Prugh
- Nationality: United States
- Born: September 1, 1984 (age 42) Spokane, Washington, U.S.
- Height: 5 ft 10 in (1.78 m)
- Weight: 165 lb (75 kg; 11.8 st)

Career
- Sport: Golf
- College: University of Washington
- Turned professional: 2007
- Current tour: Korn Ferry Tour
- Former tour: PGA Tour
- Professional wins: 1

Number of wins by tour
- PGA Tour of Australasia: 1
- Korn Ferry Tour: 1

Best results in major championships
- Masters Tournament: DNP
- PGA Championship: DNP
- U.S. Open: T21: 2019
- The Open Championship: DNP

Alexander William Prugh (born September 1, 1984) is an American professional golfer who has played on the Web.com Tour and the PGA Tour.

== Early life ==
Prugh was born and raised in Spokane, Washington. He attended Joel E. Ferris High School, where he was a member of the golf team. He later went on to play at the University of Washington, where he was a three-time varsity Pac-10 All-Conference.

== Professional career ==
In 2007, Prugh turned professional. He has spent most of his career playing on the second tier Nationwide Tour, where he has one victory, achieved at the 2009 Michael Hill New Zealand Open. In 2009, he finished 16th on the money list to earn his 2010 PGA Tour card. In his third start of the 2010 season, Prugh started the final round of the Bob Hope Classic (rain delayed until Monday) tied for the lead and ended up finishing alone in 5th place, earning $200,000. He followed that performance with another 5th place finish at the Farmers Insurance Open and a 10th place finish at the Northern Trust Open. Prugh's best finish on the PGA Tour is tied for second at the 2010 Frys.com Open. He finished 11th on the 2013 Web.com Tour regular season money list to earn his 2014 PGA Tour card. In 2013–14, he made only 4 cuts in 16 events and finished 206th on the FedEx Cup points list and lost his PGA Tour card. However, he finished 41st in the Web.com Tour Finals to earn his PGA Tour card for the 2014–15 season.

== Amateur wins ==
- 2005 Pacific Coast Amateur, Washington State Amateur

== Professional wins (1) ==
=== PGA Tour of Australasia wins (1) ===
No.	Date	Tournament	Winning score	Margin of victory	Runner-up
1	Mar 15, 2009	Michael Hill New Zealand Open^{1}	−19 (65-71-69-64=269)	3 strokes	(United States) Martin Piller

^{1}Co-sanctioned by the Nationwide Tour

=== Web.com Tour wins (1) ===
No.	Date	Tournament	Winning score	Margin of victory	Runner-up
1	Mar 15, 2009	Michael Hill New Zealand Open^{1}	−19 (65-71-69-64=269)	3 strokes	(United States) Martin Piller

^{1}Co-sanctioned by the PGA Tour of Australasia

Web.com Tour playoff record (0–1)

No.	Year	Tournament	Opponent	Result
1	2018	Rust-Oleum Championship	(United States) Chase Wright	Lost to birdie on second extra hole

== Results in major championships ==
Tournament	2007	2008	2009
Masters Tournament			
U.S. Open	CUT		
The Open Championship			
PGA Championship			

Tournament	2010	2011	2012	2013	2014	2015	2016	2017	2018
Masters Tournament									
U.S. Open									
The Open Championship									
PGA Championship									

Tournament	2019
Masters Tournament	
PGA Championship	
U.S. Open	T21
The Open Championship	

Did not play

CUT = missed the half-way cut
"T" = tied

== See also ==
- 2009 Nationwide Tour graduates
- 2013 Web.com Tour Finals graduates
- 2014 Web.com Tour Finals graduates
- 2018 Web.com Tour Finals graduates
