= 2018 Web.com Tour Finals graduates =

This is a list of golfers who graduated from the Web.com Tour and Web.com Tour Finals in 2018. The top 25 players on the Web.com Tour's regular-season money list in 2018 earned PGA Tour cards for 2019. The Finals, which concluded on September 23, determined the other 25 players to earn PGA Tour cards and the priority order of all 50.

As in previous seasons, the Finals featured the top 75 players on the Web.com Tour regular season money list, players ranked 126–200 on the PGA Tour's regular-season FedEx Cup points list (except players exempt through other means), non-members of the PGA Tour with enough regular-season FedExCup points to place in the top 200, and special medical exemptions.

To determine the initial 2019 PGA Tour priority rank, the 25 Web.com Tour regular-season graduates will be alternated with the 25 Finals graduates. This priority order will then be reshuffled several times during the 2019 season.

Im Sung-jae and Denny McCarthy are fully exempt for the 2019 PGA Tour season after leading the full-season and Finals money lists, respectively.

== 2018 Web.com Tour Finals ==
Player	2018 Web.com Tour regular season		2018 FedEx Cup	2018 Web.com Tour Finals				The 25 Regular + Finals		Priority rank
Player	Rank	Earnings ($)	2018 FedEx Cup	Rank	Without The 25	Earnings ($)	Best finish	Rank	Earnings ($)	Priority rank
(South Korea) Im Sung-jae*	1	534,326		54		19,474	T16	1	553,800	Exempt
(United States) Denny McCarthy			149	1	1	255,793	Win			Exempt
(United States) Kramer Hickok*	23	175,635		2		221,333	Win	2	396,968	1
(South Korea) Bae Sang-moon			202	3	2	218,156	Win			2
(United States) Anders Albertson*	8	210,455		9		115,235	T2	3	325,689	3
(United States) Robert Streb			178	4	3	187,460	Win			4
(United States) Sam Burns^{†}	2	291,878		T97		4,656	T35	4	296,534	5
(United States) Peter Malnati			161	5	4	157,296	2			6
(United States) Scott Langley	3	279,732		92		5,110	61	5	284,842	7
(Australia) Cameron Davis*	34	146,054		6	5	126,675	3/T3x2			8
(United States) Cameron Champ*	6	253,731		47		24,940	T16	6	278,671	9
(United States) Adam Schenk			157	7	6	125,798	T2			10
(United States) Martin Trainer*	4	267,000		112		2,712	T53	7	269,712	11
(United States) Lucas Glover			135	8	7	125,212	2			12
(South Korea) Lee Kyoung-hoon*	5	259,096		82		8,575	T32	8	267,671	13
(Australia) Matt Jones			151	10	8	112,000	T2			14
(United States) Chase Wright*	9	208,896		25		47,380	T3	9	256,276	15
(United States) Hunter Mahan			159	11	9	107,505	T2			16
(Colombia) Sebastián Muñoz	7	238,938		T97		4,656	T35	10	243,593	17
(Canada) Roger Sloan	49	105,288		12	10	84,307	T2			18
(United States) Kyle Jones*	11	207,419		44		26,000	T9	11	233,419	19
(United States) Shawn Stefani			147	13	11	80,579	4			20
(Canada) Adam Svensson*	14	190,825		43		29,008	T8	12	219,833	21
(United States) Seth Reeves*	66	81,199		14	12	80,360	T4			22
(United States) Alex Prugh	18	184,671		38		30,830	T9	13	215,500	23
(United States) Max Homa	73	72,440		15	13	78,200	T6			24
(United States) John Chin*	10	207,909		T104		3,155	T43	14	211,064	25
(Mexico) Roberto Díaz	171	9,283	189	16	14	70,326	5			26
(Mexico) José de Jesús Rodríguez*	12	197,798		T107		2,940	T46	15	200,738	27
(Germany) Stephan Jäger	56	99,000	165	17	15	69,923	T4			28
(United States) Josh Teater	15	190,288		77		9,975	T29	16	200,263	29
(Australia) Curtis Luck^{†}	60	87,526		18	16	64,920	T5			30
(Mexico) Carlos Ortiz	21	178,780		57		16,556	T25	17	195,337	31
(United States) Nicholas Lindheim			146	19	17	59,169	T8			32
(United States) Wyndham Clark*	16	187,817		T97		4,656	T35	18	192,473	33
(South Africa) Dylan Frittelli^{†}				20	18	48,600	T9			34
(United States) Adam Long*	13	192,463		n/a		0	CUT	19	192,463	35
(United States) Wes Roach	28	162,759		21	19	48,100	T10			36
(Argentina) Julián Etulain	17	186,042		125		2,260	77	20	188,302	37
(Austria) Sepp Straka*	31	158,080		22	20	47,844	T3			38
(United States) Chris Thompson*	20	181,738		T95		4,750	T36	21	186,488	39
(United States) Cameron Tringale			195	23	21	47,760	T3			40
(United States) Joey Garber*	19	182,762		109		2,744	T51	22	185,506	41
(Canada) Ben Silverman			136	24	22	47,700	T3			42
(United States) Brady Schnell*	22	178,081		119		2,410	T69	23	180,491	43
(United States) Michael Thompson			142	26	23	45,466	6			44
(United States) Roberto Castro	24	172,054		n/a		0	DNP	24	172,054	45
(Argentina) Fabián Gómez			162	27	24	43,657	T9			46
(United States) Hank Lebioda*	25	167,014		T110		2,744	T51	25	169,758	47
(United States) Jim Knous*	52	100,885		28	25	41,931	T10			48

*PGA Tour rookie in 2019
^{†}First-time PGA Tour member in 2019, but ineligible for rookie status due to having played eight or more PGA Tour events in a previous season

- Earned spot in Finals through PGA Tour.
- Earned spot in Finals through FedEx Cup points earned as a PGA Tour non-member.
- Earned spot in Finals through a medical extension.
- Indicates whether the player earned his card through the regular season or through the Finals.

== Results on 2019 PGA Tour ==
Player	Starts	Cuts made	Best finish	Money list rank	Earnings ($)	FedEx Cup rank
(South Korea) Im Sung-jae*	35	26	T3	30	2,851,134	19
(United States) Denny McCarthy	28	12	T7	119	925,156	111
(United States) Kramer Hickok*	26	13	T10	165	494,424	161
(South Korea) Bae Sang-moon	22	8	T27	206	172,472	205
(United States) Anders Albertson*	25	10	T5	170	449,226	172
(United States) Robert Streb	28	12	T3	135	796,525	128
(United States) Sam Burns^{†}	26	16	T3	95	1,117,312	94
(United States) Peter Malnati	26	18	T9	126	864,496	118
(United States) Scott Langley	27	12	6	149	635,883	153
(Australia) Cameron Davis*	25	13	T11	167	477,467	160
(United States) Cameron Champ*	26	14	Win	64	1,695,748	62
(United States) Adam Schenk	25	13	T6	90	1,257,158	71
(United States) Martin Trainer*	25	7	Win	142	692,155	132
(United States) Lucas Glover	26	21	T4	36	2,613,965	29
(South Korea) Lee Kyoung-hoon*	30	16	T3	102	1,061,457	108
(Australia) Matt Jones	27	17	T4	108	1,024,852	91
(United States) Chase Wright*	26	11	T7	158	571,575	156
(United States) Hunter Mahan	21	8	T15	187	287,579	184
(Colombia) Sebastián Muñoz	26	16	T9	116	946,666	117
(Canada) Roger Sloan	27	17	T2	111	1,015,661	93
(United States) Kyle Jones*	26	10	T15	189	277,762	187
(United States) Shawn Stefani	25	15	T6	134	798,831	127
(Canada) Adam Svensson*	25	11	T15	177	405,730	167
(United States) Seth Reeves*	25	11	T7	182	309,588	188
(United States) Alex Prugh	26	13	T13	168	467,732	168
(United States) Max Homa	25	16	Win	52	2,063,606	60
(United States) John Chin*	21	7	T3	185	294,536	186
(Mexico) Roberto Díaz	23	14	T8	152	620,178	155
(Mexico) José de Jesús Rodríguez*	23	10	T11	179	394,402	177
(Germany) Stephan Jäger	26	13	T14x2	151	623,145	152
(United States) Josh Teater	24	13	T6x2	146	663,570	146
(Australia) Curtis Luck^{†}	23	10	T5	172	432,569	175
(Mexico) Carlos Ortiz	28	14	T3	100	1,073,962	113
(United States) Nicholas Lindheim	17	5	T12	198	227,124	198
(United States) Wyndham Clark*	27	19	T5	89	1,278,721	64
(South Africa) Dylan Frittelli^{†}	24	17	Win	69	1,576,974	63
(United States) Adam Long*	27	11	Win	66	1,648,007	69
(United States) Wes Roach	21	13	T3	128	860,264	134
(Argentina) Julián Etulain	24	12	T14	181	360,653	176
(Austria) Sepp Straka*	25	13	3	117	934,894	115
(United States) Chris Thompson*	19	4	T31	224	81,635	222
(United States) Cameron Tringale	21	16	T5x2	105	1,049,106	106
(United States) Joey Garber*	22	10	T7	169	454,296	170
(Canada) Ben Silverman	24	11	T12	184	298,497	181
(United States) Brady Schnell*	21	6	T12	199	210,914	196
(United States) Michael Thompson	22	14	T7	87	1,307,816	89
(United States) Roberto Castro	22	16	T5x2	144	674,250	142
(Argentina) Fabián Gómez	20	11	T13x2	171	433,027	169
(United States) Hank Lebioda*	23	15	T5	147	656,802	148
(United States) Jim Knous*	18	10	T10	166	490,976	166

*PGA Tour rookie in 2019
^{†}First-time PGA Tour member in 2019, but ineligible for rookie status due to having played eight or more PGA Tour events in a previous season

- Retained his PGA Tour card for 2020: won or finished in the top 125 of the FedEx Cup points list.
- Retained PGA Tour conditional status and qualified for the Web.com Tour Finals: finished between 126–150 on FedEx Cup list.
- Failed to retain his PGA Tour card for 2020 but qualified for the Web.com Tour Finals: finished between 150–200 on FedEx Cup list.
- Failed to retain his PGA Tour card for 2020 and to qualify for the Web.com Tour Finals: finished outside the top 200 on FedEx Cup list.

Kramer Hickok, Robert Streb, Cameron Davis, Fabián Gómez, and Hank Lebioda regained their cards through the 2019 Korn Ferry Tour Finals.

== Winners on the PGA Tour in 2019 ==
No.	Date	Player	Tournament	Winning score	Margin of victory	Runner-up	Payout ($)
1	Oct 28, 2018	(United States) Cameron Champ	Sanderson Farms Championship	−21 (65-70-64-68=267)	4 strokes	(Canada) Corey Conners	792,000
2	Jan 20	(United States) Adam Long	Desert Classic	−26 (63-71-63-65=262)	1 stroke	(Canada) Adam Hadwin (United States) Phil Mickelson	1,062,000
3	Feb 24	(United States) Martin Trainer	Puerto Rico Open	−15 (70-67-69-67=273)	3 strokes	(Australia) Aaron Baddeley (United States) Daniel Berger (Canada) Roger Sloan (United States) Johnson Wagner	540,000
4	May 5	(United States) Max Homa	Wells Fargo Championship	−15 (69-63-70-67=269)	3 strokes	(United States) Joel Dahmen	1,422,000
5	Jul 14	(South Africa) Dylan Frittelli	John Deere Classic	−21 (66-68-65-64=263)	2 strokes	(United States) Russell Henley	1,080,000

== Runners-up on the PGA Tour in 2019 ==
No.	Date	Player	Tournament	Winner	Winning score	Runner-up score	Payout ($)
1	Feb 24	(Canada) Roger Sloan	Puerto Rico Open	(United States) Martin Trainer	−15 (70-67-69-67=273)	−12 (70-67-72-67=276)	198,000
