= Rust-Oleum Championship =

Tournament information
- Location: Ivanhoe, Illinois
- Established: 2014
- Course: Ivanhoe Club
- Par: 72
- Length: 7,022 yards (6,421 m)
- Tour: Web.com Tour
- Format: Stroke play
- Prize fund: US$600,000
- Month played: June
- Final year: 2018

Tournament record score
- Aggregate: 266 Shane Bertsch (2015)
- To par: −18 as above

Final champion
- (United States) Chase Wright
- Location in the United States Location in Illinois

The Rust-Oleum Championship was a golf tournament on the Web.com Tour from 2014 to 2018. It was first played in June 2014 as the Cleveland Open at the Lakewood Country Club in Westlake, Ohio, a suburb of Cleveland. In 2016, it moved to Ivanhoe Club in Ivanhoe, Illinois.

In the inaugural edition, Steven Alker defeated Dawie van der Walt in an eleven-hole playoff, the longest in Web.com Tour history.

== Winners ==
| Year | Winne | Score | To par | Margin of victory | Runner(s)-up |
Rust-Oleum Championship
| 2018 | (United States) Chase Wright | 271 | −17 | Playoff | (United States) Alex Prugh |
| 2017 | (Germany) Stephan Jäger | 274 | −14 | 2 strokes | (United States) Ted Potter Jr. |
| 2016 | (United States) Max Homa | 275 | −13 | 1 stroke | (United States) John Mallinger (United States) Josh Teater |
| 2015 | (United States) Shane Bertsch | 266 | −18 | 1 stroke | (Brazil) Lucas Lee |
Cleveland Open
| 2014 | (New Zealand) Steven Alker | 270 | −14 | Playoff | (South Africa) Dawie van der Walt |

== See also ==
- DAP Championship, a Web.com Tour Finals event in the Cleveland suburb of Beachwood to begin in 2016
- Legend Financial Group Classic, a Web.com Tour event in the Cleveland suburb of Highland Heights from 2005 to 2007
- Greater Cleveland Open, a Web.com Tour event from 1990 to 2001
- Cleveland Open, a PGA Tour event from 1963 to 1972
