= Aruba Cup =

Tournament information
- Location: Aruba (2016, 2017); Mexico (2019)
- Established: 2016
- Courses: Tierra del Sol Resort, Spa & Country Club (2016, 2017); Cozumel Country Club (2018)
- Tours: PGA Tour Canada; PGA Tour Latinoamérica
- Format: Match play
- Prize fund: US$120,000
- Month played: December
- Final year: 2018

Final champion
- PGA Tour Latinoamérica

The Aruba Cup was an annual team golf competition between teams representing PGA Tour Latinoamérica and PGA Tour Canada. It was founded in 2016 and took place in December.

The 2016 and 2017 events were held at the Tierra del Sol Resort, Spa & Country Club near Noord, Aruba. In 2018 the event was played at Cozumel Country Club on the island of Cozumel in the Caribbean Sea off the eastern coast of Mexico's Yucatán Peninsula and was called the Cozumel Cup.

== Format ==
The teams consisted of 10 golfers from each tour. The tournament was played over three days with 5 fourball matches on the first day, 5 foursomes on the second day and 10 singles matches on the final day. One point was awarded for each win and a half point for a halved match. With a total of 20 points, a team needed to get 10.5 points to win the Cup.

In 2016 and 2017 prize money was US$8,000 for members of the winning team and $4,000 for each member of the losing team, a total of $120,000.

== History ==
The inaugural event was held December 15–17, 2016. The captains were Julián Etulain and Stephen Ames. PGA Tour Latinoamérica won the cup 13–7, despite PGA Tour Canada winning the singles 5½–4½. The teams consisted of the leading 10 in the Order of Merit with a minimum of either 5 players from Latin American countries or 5 Canadians.

The second event was held December 14–16, 2017. The team captains were Roberto Díaz and Ben Silverman. PGA Tour Canada won the cup 10½–9½, despite PGA Tour Latinoamérica winning the singles 6–4. The contest was decided in the last match to finish when T. J. Vogel halved his match against Brady Schnell, both players making bogeys on the final hole. The teams consisted of the leading 10 in the Order of Merit.

The third event was held December 13–15, 2018 at Cozumel Country Club. Playing captains were chosen for the first time; Harry Higgs and Sam Fidone. PGA Tour Latinoamérica won the cup 11½–8½. They led 6–4 are the first two days but lost the first four singles matches. However, in the last six singles they won five and halved the other, for a three point victory.

== Results ==
Year	Venue	Winning team	Score	Latinoamérica captain	Canada captain
Go Vacaciones Cozumel Cup presented by Assist Card
2018	Cozumel Country Club	PGA Tour Latinoamérica	11½–8½	Harry Higgs	Sam Fidone
Aruba Cup
2017	Tierra del Sol	PGA Tour Canada	10½–9½	Roberto Díaz	Ben Silverman
2016	Tierra del Sol	PGA Tour Latinoamérica	13–7	Julián Etulain	Stephen Ames

== Teams ==
=== PGA Tour Latinoamérica ===
- 2016: Samuel Del Val, Andrés Echavarría, Seth Fair, Nate Lashley, Sebastián MacLean, Leandro Marelli, Augusto Núñez, Eric Steger, Martin Trainer, Tom Whitney
- 2017: Rodolfo Cazaubón, Óscar Fraustro, Tee-K Kelly, Hank Lebioda, Nelson Ledesma, Brian Richey, José de Jesús Rodríguez, Brady Schnell, José Toledo, Jared Wolfe
- 2018: Tyson Alexander, Michael Buttacavoli, Nico Echavarría, Matt Gilchrest, Harry Higgs, Horacio León, Ben Polland, Marcelo Rozo, Austin Smotherman, Eric Steger

=== PGA Tour Canada ===
- 2016: Paul Barjon, Austin Connelly, Corey Conners, Adam Cornelson, Michael Gligic, Brock Mackenzie, Dan McCarthy, Taylor Moore, Max Rottluff, Ryan Williams
- 2017: Kramer Hickok, Rico Hoey, Lee McCoy, Patrick Newcomb, Jordan Niebrugge, Max Rottluff, Johnny Ruiz, Robby Shelton, T. J. Vogel, Chase Wright
- 2018: Mark Anguiano, George Cunningham, Sam Fidone, Michael Gellerman, Ben Griffin, Ian Holt, Blake Olson, Corey Pereira, Danny Walker, Zach Wright
