= Max Homa =

American professional golfer (born 1990)

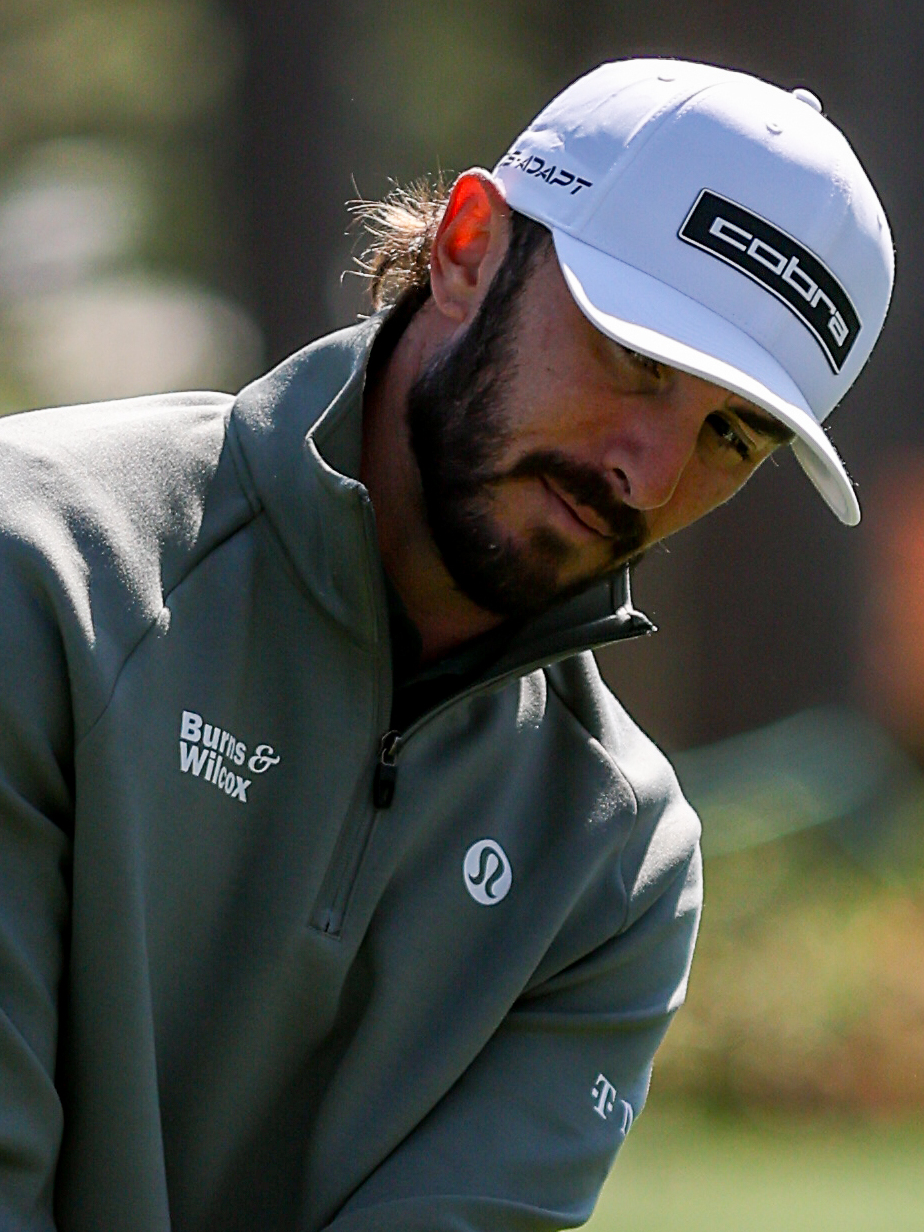
- Homa in 2024

Personal information
- Full name: John Maxwell Homa
- Nationality: United States
- Born: November 19, 1990 (age 35) Burbank, California, U.S.
- Height: 6 ft 1 in (1.85 m)
- Weight: 180 lb (82 kg; 13 st)
- Spouse: Lacey Croom (m. 2019)
- Children: 2

Career
- Sport: Golf
- College: University of California, Berkeley
- Turned professional: 2013
- Current tour: PGA Tour
- Former tour: Web.com Tour
- Professional wins: 9
- Highest ranking: 5 (April 2, 2023) (as of October 25, 2026)

Number of wins by tour
- PGA Tour: 6
- European Tour: 1
- Korn Ferry Tour: 2

Best results in major championships
- Masters Tournament: T3: 2024
- PGA Championship: T13: 2022
- U.S. Open: T47: 2022
- The Open Championship: T10: 2023

John Maxwell Homa (born November 19, 1990) is an American professional golfer. During his amateur career at the University of California, Berkeley, he won both the individual Pac-12 Men's Golf Championship and NCAA Division I Men's Golf Championship in 2013. He turned professional later that year, and he has since won six times on the PGA Tour. He reached the top five in the Official World Golf Ranking in 2023.

== Early life ==
Homa was born in Burbank, California, on November 19, 1990. He is Jewish, and attended six years of Hebrew school and had a bar mitzvah, but has stated he is not religious. He said in 2018: "The most Jewish I've ever felt came after looking at a home with extravagant Christmas lights and immediately thinking 'that electric bill must be brutal'."

== Amateur career ==
Homa attended Valencia High School in the Santa Clarita Valley. There, he was a four-time first-team All-Foothill League selection, and 2009 Foothill League MVP, graduating in 2009.

He then played college golf at University of California, Berkeley, on scholarship, earning a degree in Consumer Behavior. There, as a junior in 2011-12 Homa was a third-team PING Division I All-American and second-team All-Pac-12 and PING Division I All-West Region. As a senior in 2012-13 he was ranked No. 19 nationally by Golfweek (5/19) and No. 22 according by Golfstat (5/21), was first-team All-Pac-12, ranked No. 17 on the final Palmer Cup Ranking, and won the Pac-12 Championship with an opening-round nine-under par 61 breaking the course record at the North Course at the Los Angeles Country Club and tying for the lowest round posted in the U.S. He was named a first-team All-American and to the All-Nicklaus Team by the Golf Coaches Association of America.

In 2008, Homa was selected to represent Southern California on the Junior America's Cup team. In 2009, he won the Ventura County Junior Golf Association at River Ridge in Oxnard (72-73=145).

In 2010, he reached the quarterfinals of the U.S. Amateur before losing to reigning champion and Cal teammate An Byeong-hun. Homa ended the year ranked 4th in California, 33rd in the U.S., and 78th in world according to amateurgolf.com.

In 2011, Homa won the amateurgolf.com Silicon Valley Amateur (63-70=133). He ended the year ranked 8th in California, 36th in the U.S., and 89th in the world according to amateurgolf.com. In 2012, he ended the year ranked 5th in California, 18th in the U.S., and 50th in the world according to amateurgolf.com.

Homa competed as an amateur at the 2013 U.S. Open, and won the individual 2013 NCAA Division I Men's Golf Championship. He was selected to the 2013 Walker Cup squad, and turned professional after the event.

== Professional career ==
In October 2013, Homa finished T-9 at the Frys.com Open, his first PGA Tour event as a pro. In December 2013, he tied for 6th place in the Web.com Tour qualifying school. In May 2014, he earned his first professional win at the Web.com Tour's BMW Charity Pro-Am, defeating fellow rookie Jonathan Randolph by one stroke, earning $117,000. He finished 17th on the Web.com Tour regular-season money list, to earn his PGA Tour card for the 2014–15 season.

In the 2015 PGA Tour season, Homa entered 27 events. He made 12 cuts and won $380,339. He finished 163rd in the FedEx Cup standings and lost his tour card. In the 2016 Web.com Tour season, Homa won the Rust-Oleum Championship in Ivanhoe, Illinois, coming from seven shots back, and ultimately regained his PGA Tour Card for the 2016–17 season.

In the 2017 PGA Tour season, Homa made only two cuts in 17 events and lost his card. That year he made just $18,008 in tournament prize money. In 2017 he tweeted: "Had a few caddies hit me up recently hoping to team up. They heard they usually get weekends off which is apparently a great selling point."

In the 2018 Web.com Tour season, Homa regained his PGA Tour card for the 2019 PGA Tour season.

On May 5, 2019, Homa won the Wells Fargo Championship for his first PGA Tour victory, with a three-shot victory over Joel Dahmen. Homa received $1.422 million for his win, a two-year extension of his PGA Tour card, as well as spots in the PGA Championship and in the 2020 Masters Tournament.

On February 21, 2021, Homa earned his second PGA Tour victory at the Genesis Invitational in a playoff over Tony Finau.

In September 2021, Homa won his third PGA Tour title at the Fortinet Championship, the opening event of the 2021–22 season. In May 2022, Homa won the Wells Fargo Championship for a second time. He ended the season finishing in a tie for 5th at the Tour Championship.

In September 2022, he successfully defended the Fortinet Championship, chipping-in for a birdie on the final hole to beat Danny Willett by one stroke. He was selected to play on the U.S. team in the 2022 Presidents Cup; he won all four of the matches he played.

In January 2023, Homa won the Farmers Insurance Open. He came from behind with a final round six-under par 66 for a two shot victory over Keegan Bradley. In September 2023, Homa played on the U.S. team in the 2023 Ryder Cup at Marco Simone Golf and Country Club in Guidonia, Lazio, Italy. The European team won 16.5–11.5 and Homa was the leading U.S. point getter with a record of 3–1–1 including a win in his Sunday singles match against Matt Fitzpatrick. In November 2023, won the Nedbank Golf Challenge in South Africa, shooting 19-under-par to claim his first victory outside of the United States.

In January 2024, Homa hit a 477-yard drive during the third round of The Sentry, the longest drive in the PGA Tour's ShotLink era (since 2003). In April 2024, Homa tied for third place in the 2024 Masters Tournament at −4, winning $1,040,000 and marking the first top-5 finish in a major of his career. In October, began working with a new swing coach, John Scott Rattan, the director of instruction at Congressional Country Club.

On January 1, 2025, it was announced that Homa was joining Cobra Golf, Puma Golf, and apparel company lululemon as an ambassador, bringing an end to his relationship with Titleist. Homa split with his caddie, Joe Greiner, in April 2025, amidst a downturn in performance. Homa and Greiner were childhood friends, and Greiner had been on Homa's bag first in 2013 and continuously since 2019, including for each of his six PGA Tour wins.

== Personal life ==
In November 2019, he married Lacey Croom. The couple live in Scottsdale, Arizona, and have two sons.

== Amateur wins ==
- 2013 NCAA Division I Championship

== Professional wins (9) ==
=== PGA Tour wins (6) ===
No.	Date	Tournament	Winning score	Margin of victory	Runner(s)-up
1	May 5, 2019	Wells Fargo Championship	−15 (69-63-70-67=269)	3 strokes	(United States) Joel Dahmen
2	Feb 21, 2021	Genesis Invitational	−12 (66-70-70-66=272)	Playoff	(United States) Tony Finau
3	Sep 19, 2021	Fortinet Championship	−19 (67-72-65-65=269)	1 stroke	(United States) Maverick McNealy
4	May 8, 2022	Wells Fargo Championship (2)	−8 (67-66-71-68=272)	2 strokes	(United States) Keegan Bradley, (England) Matt Fitzpatrick, (United States) Cameron Young
5	Sep 18, 2022	Fortinet Championship (2)	−16 (65-67-72-68=272)	1 stroke	(England) Danny Willett
6	Jan 28, 2023	Farmers Insurance Open	−13 (68-70-71-66=275)	2 strokes	(United States) Keegan Bradley

PGA Tour playoff record (1–0)

No.	Year	Tournament	Opponent	Result
1	2021	Genesis Invitational	(United States) Tony Finau	Won with par on second extra hole

=== European Tour wins (1) ===
No.	Date	Tournament	Winning score	Margin of victory	Runner-up
1	Nov 12, 2023	Nedbank Golf Challenge	−19 (66-68-69-66=269)	4 strokes	(Denmark) Nicolai Højgaard

=== Web.com Tour wins (2) ===
No.	Date	Tournament	Winning score	Margin of victory	Runner-up
1	May 18, 2014	BMW Charity Pro-Am	−20 (68-65-70-63=266)	1 stroke	(United States) Jonathan Randolph
2	Jun 12, 2016	Rust-Oleum Championship	−13 (71-69-68-67=275)	1 stroke	(United States) John Mallinger

== Results in major championships ==
Results not in chronological order in 2020.

Tournament	2013	2014	2015	2016	2017	2018
Masters Tournament						
U.S. Open	CUT					
The Open Championship						
PGA Championship						

Tournament	2019	2020	2021	2022	2023	2024	2025	2026
Masters Tournament		CUT	CUT	T48	T43	T3	T12	T9
PGA Championship	T64	CUT	CUT	T13	T55	T35	T60	CUT
U.S. Open		CUT	CUT	T47	CUT	CUT		
The Open Championship		NT	T40	CUT	T10	T43		T28

Did not play

CUT = missed the half-way cut
"T" = tied for place
NT = no tournament due to COVID-19 pandemic

=== Summary ===
Tournament	Wins	2nd	3rd	Top-5	Top-10	Top-25	Events	Cuts made
Masters Tournament	0	0	1	1	2	3	7	5
PGA Championship	0	0	0	0	0	1	8	5
U.S. Open	0	0	0	0	0	0	6	1
The Open Championship	0	0	0	0	1	1	5	4
Totals	0	0	1	1	3	5	26	15

- Most consecutive cuts made – 4 (2021 Open – 2022 U.S. Open)
- Longest streak of top-10s – 2 (2023 Open Championship – 2024 Masters)

== Results in The Players Championship ==
Tournament	2021	2022	2023	2024	2025	2026
The Players Championship	CUT	T13	T6	T64	CUT	T32

Top 10

CUT = missed the halfway cut
"T" indicates a tie for a place

== Results in World Golf Championships ==
Tournament	2019	2020	2021	2022	2023
Championship			T22		
Match Play		NT^{1}	T18	T35	R16
Invitational	T61	T52	T51		
Champions		NT^{1}	NT^{1}	NT^{1}	

^{1}Cancelled due to COVID-19 pandemic

Top 10
Did not play

NT = No tournament
"T" = Tied
QF, R16, R32, R64 = Round in which player lost in match play
Note that the Championship and Invitational were discontinued from 2022. The Champions was discontinued from 2023.

== U.S. national team appearances ==
Amateur

- Walker Cup: 2013 (winners)

Professional

- Presidents Cup: 2022 (winners), 2024 (winners)
- Ryder Cup: 2023

== See also ==
- 2014 Web.com Tour Finals graduates
- 2016 Web.com Tour Finals graduates
- 2018 Web.com Tour Finals graduates
- List of Jewish golfers
