= Ben Silverman (golfer) =

Canadian professional golfer (born 1987)

Personal information
- Full name: Benjamin William Silverman
- Nationality: Canada
- Born: November 15, 1987 (age 39) Thornhill, Ontario, Canada
- Height: 5 ft 10 in (178 cm)
- Weight: 160 lb (73 kg)
- Spouse: Morgan
- Children: 2

Career
- Sport: Golf
- College: Johnson & Wales University; Florida Atlantic University
- Turned professional: 2010
- Current tour: PGA Tour
- Former tours: Korn Ferry Tour; PGA Tour Canada
- Professional wins: 2

Number of wins by tour
- Korn Ferry Tour: 2

Best results in major championships
- Masters Tournament: DNP
- PGA Championship: DNP
- U.S. Open: CUT: 2022, 2026
- The Open Championship: DNP

Benjamin William Silverman (born November 15, 1987) is a Canadian professional golfer who has played on the PGA Tour. In 2017 he won the Price Cutter Charity Championship.

== Early and personal life ==
Silverman was born in Thornhill, Ontario, in Canada, to Howard and Maureen Silverman, and is Jewish. He played golf at Vaughan Secondary School in Vaughan, Ontario.

Silverman attended Johnson & Wales University in Florida for two years, and then Florida Atlantic University, where Silverman obtained a bachelor's degree in psychology in 2010. He was a walk-on on the golf teams of both schools.

Silverman lives in Juno Beach, Florida. He and his wife, Morgan, have two sons.

== Professional career ==
Silverman turned pro in 2010. He joined the PGA Tour Canada in 2014. In 2015, he qualified for the Web.com Tour for 2016 via the qualifying tournament, and in 2017 won the Price Cutter Charity Championship on his way to 10th place on the end of season money list to graduate to the elite PGA Tour for 2018.

In his rookie season on the PGA Tour, Silverman failed to win enough money to retain his card directly, finishing 136th on the FedEx Cup standings. He immediately regained his place through the 2018 Web.com Tour Finals after tying for third at the Web.com Tour Championship, but in 2019 was only able to finish 181st in the FedEx Cup standings and returned to the second-tier Korn Ferry Tour for the 2020 season.

Silverman won the gold medal by 11 shots in the open Men's Golf Championship at the 2013 Maccabiah Games at the Caesarea Golf Club in Israel, while the entire Team Canada won the bronze medal in the team event.

== Professional wins (2) ==
=== Korn Ferry Tour wins (2) ===
No.	Date	Tournament	Winning score	To par	Margin of victory	Runner-up
1	Aug 13, 2017	Price Cutter Charity Championship	70-63-63-67=263	−25	1 stroke	(United States) Talor Gooch
2	Jan 25, 2023	The Bahamas Great Abaco Classic	71-65-67-70=273	−15	Playoff	(United States) Cody Blick

Korn Ferry Tour playoff record (1–1)

No.	Year	Tournament	Opponent	Result
1	2023	The Bahamas Great Abaco Classic	(United States) Cody Blick	Won with par on first extra hole
2	2023	HomeTown Lenders Championship	(United States) Ben Kohles	Lost to birdie on second extra hole

== Results in major championships ==
Tournament	2022	2023	2024	2025	2026
Masters Tournament					
PGA Championship					
U.S. Open	CUT				CUT
The Open Championship					

Did not play

CUT = missed the half-way cut

== Results in The Players Championship ==
Tournament	2025
The Players Championship	CUT

CUT = missed the half-way cut

== Team appearances ==
Professional

- Aruba Cup (representing PGA Tour Canada): 2017 (non-playing captain)

== See also ==
- 2017 Web.com Tour Finals graduates
- 2018 Web.com Tour Finals graduates
- 2023 Korn Ferry Tour graduates
- List of Jewish golfers
