= Chase Wright (golfer) =

American professional golfer (born 1989)

Personal information
- Nationality: United States
- Born: June 16, 1989 (age 37) Muncie, Indiana, U.S.
- Height: 5 ft 10 in (1.78 m)
- Weight: 165 lb (75 kg; 11.8 st)

Career
- Sport: Golf
- College: Indiana University
- Turned professional: 2012
- Current tour: Korn Ferry Tour
- Former tours: Asian Tour; PGA Tour
- Professional wins: 3

Number of wins by tour
- Korn Ferry Tour: 1
- Other: 2

Chase Wright (born June 16, 1989) is an American professional golfer.

Wright was born in Muncie, Indiana. He attended Delta High School where he was a four-time Indiana All-State squad member. Wright won the AJGA Andover Open in 2005. In college, he played golf for Indiana University. In his senior year, Wright was an Academic All-Big Ten selection as well as named to the All-Big Ten First Team. He turned professional in 2012.

== Professional history ==
Wright played in one PGA Tour event in 2012 and finished T64 at The McGladrey Classic.

In 2013, Wright played in the Asian Tour where he made two cuts with his best finish a T22 at the Queen's Cup in Samui, Thailand.

In 2014, Wright made a move to the Web.com Tour. He played in 24 tournaments, made 12 cuts with 4 top-10 finishes and 7 top-25 finishes.

In 2015, Wright started his second season on the Web.com Tour with a 3rd-place finish in the Pacific Rubiales Colombia Championship.

== Professional wins (3) ==
=== Web.com Tour wins (1) ===
No.	Date	Tournament	Winning score	Margin of victory	Runner-up
1	Jun 10, 2018	Rust-Oleum Championship	−17 (67-68-68-68=271)	Playoff	(United States) Alex Prugh

Web.com Tour playoff record (1–0)

No.	Year	Tournament	Opponent	Result
1	2018	Rust-Oleum Championship	(United States) Alex Prugh	Won with birdie on second extra hole

=== PGA Tour Canada wins (1) ===
No.	Date	Tournament	Winning score	Margin of victory	Runners-up
1	Aug 13, 2017	ATB Financial Classic	−15 (65-65-72-67=269)	1 stroke	(South Korea) Todd Baek, (Canada) Wes Heffernan

=== Other wins (1) ===
- 2010 Indiana Open

== Team appearances ==
Amateur

- Junior Ryder Cup (representing the United States): 2004

Professional

- Aruba Cup (representing PGA Tour Canada): 2017 (winners)

== See also ==
- 2018 Web.com Tour Finals graduates
