= Scott Langley =

American golfer

Personal information
- Full name: Scott Alexander Langley
- Nationality: United States
- Born: April 28, 1989 (age 37) Barrington, Illinois, U.S.
- Height: 5 ft 10 in (1.78 m)
- Weight: 160 lb (73 kg; 11 st)
- Spouse: Kristy Langley

Career
- Sport: Golf
- College: University of Illinois
- Turned professional: 2011
- Current tour: Korn Ferry Tour
- Former tour: PGA Tour
- Professional wins: 1

Number of wins by tour
- Korn Ferry Tour: 1

Best results in major championships
- Masters Tournament: DNP
- PGA Championship: DNP
- U.S. Open: T16: 2010
- The Open Championship: DNP

Scott Alexander Langley (born April 28, 1989) is an American professional golfer. Langley is notable for making the cut at the 2010 U.S. Open as an amateur. Langley is the first alumnus of The First Tee to make it on the PGA Tour. He turned professional in 2011. He earned his PGA Tour card for 2013 at qualifying school.

== Early life ==
In 1989, Langley was born in Barrington, Illinois. He attended Parkway South High School. Among individuals, he finished fourth place at the Missouri State High School Championship.

== Amateur career ==
Langley attended University of Illinois Urbana-Champaign. He was a two-time All-American. He finished in second place at the 2007 Metropolitan Amateur Championship.

In 2010, Langley had much success at USGA events. Finished tied for 16th and was low amateur (tied with Russell Henley) at 2010 U.S. Open. He was a quarter-finalist at 2010 U.S. Amateur.

== Professional career ==
In 2011, Langley turned professional. In his first event as a PGA Tour member, Langley carded an –8 (62) and led in the first round of the 2013 Sony Open in Hawaii. In the second round, he carded a –4 (66) positioning him into second. Langley ended the third round with a 65, tied for the lead with Russell Henley, another PGA Tour rookie. Langley finished T3, seven strokes behind Henley. He ended the PGA Tour Season 124th in FedEx Cup points and retained his card for the 2014 season.

On February 4, 2018, Langley won the Panama Championship on the Web.com Tour by two strokes.

On November 16, 2021, Langley announced on Twitter his retirement from professional golf.

== Amateur wins ==
- 2006 Wal-Mart First Tee Open at Pebble Beach
- 2007 AJGA Midwest Junior Players Championship
- 2008 Metropolitan Open Championship (St. Louis)
- 2009 Metropolitan Open Championship (St. Louis)
- 2010 Metropolitan Amateur Match Play Championship, NCAA individual championship

== Professional wins (1) ==
=== Web.com Tour wins (1) ===
| No. | Date | Tournament | Winning score | To par | Margin of victory | Runners-up |
|---|---|---|---|---|---|---|
| 1 | Feb 4, 2018 | Panama Championship | 71-68-69-65=273 | −7 | 2 strokes | (Puerto Rico) Rafael Campos, (United States) Edward Loar |

== Results in major championships ==
| Tournament | 2010 | 2011 | 2012 | 2013 | 2014 |
|---|---|---|---|---|---|
| Masters Tournament | | | | | |
| U.S. Open | T16_{LA} | | T29 | T41 | T54 |
| The Open Championship | | | | | |
| PGA Championship | | | | | |

Did not play

LA = Low amateur
"T" = tied for place

== Results in The Players Championship ==
| Tournament | 2013 | 2014 | 2015 | 2016 | 2017 | 2018 | 2019 |
|---|---|---|---|---|---|---|---|
| The Players Championship | CUT | T34 | T66 | | | | T67 |

Did not play

CUT = missed the halfway cut
"T" indicates a tie for a place

== U.S. national team appearances ==
Amateur

- Eisenhower Trophy: 2010
- Palmer Cup: 2010 (winners)

== See also ==
- 2012 PGA Tour Qualifying School graduates
- 2018 Web.com Tour Finals graduates
