= Kramer Hickok =

American professional golfer (born 1992)

Personal information
- Full name: Kramer Austin Hickok
- Nationality: United States
- Born: April 14, 1992 (age 34) Austin, Texas, U.S.
- Height: 5 ft 11 in (1.80 m)
- Weight: 178 lb (81 kg; 12.7 st)

Career
- Sport: Golf
- College: University of Texas
- Turned professional: 2016
- Current tour: PGA Tour
- Former tours: Web.com Tour; PGA Tour Canada
- Professional wins: 3

Number of wins by tour
- Korn Ferry Tour: 1
- Other: 2

Best results in major championships
- Masters Tournament: DNP
- PGA Championship: T69: 2022
- U.S. Open: DNP
- The Open Championship: DNP

Achievements and awards
- PGA Tour Canada Order of Merit winner: 2017

Kramer Austin Hickok (born April 14, 1992) is an American professional golfer who currently plays on the PGA Tour. He previously played on the Web.com Tour and PGA Tour Canada. He was PGA Tour Canada's player of the year in 2017.

== Early life and education ==
Kramer Austin Hickok was born on April 14, 1992. He attended the University of Texas and was a freshman the same year as Jordan Spieth. He roomed with Spieth during the university's national championship season in 2011–12 and later caddied for him at the 2011 AT&T Byron Nelson. He played four years for the Longhorns, earning a degree in Geography in 2015.

== Career ==
Hickok turned professional after his 2015 season at the University of Texas. His first tournament was the Panama Championship where he finished tied for 64th place.

Hickok played on the PGA Tour Canada in 2017 where he earned player of the year honors, winning twice during the season; The Players Cup and the Ontario Championship. He was also the Order of Merit winner for the 2017 season.

Hickok played on the Web.com Tour in 2018 and finished the regular season inside the top 25 of the money list, earning his PGA Tour card for the 2018–19 season. During the Web.com Tour Finals, he won the DAP Championship, defeating Hunter Mahan and Matt Jones by three strokes. He went wire-to-wire for the tournament, and matched the course record with a single round of 63 on the first day.

In June 2021, Hickok tied for the lead of the Travelers Championship after 72 holes. He ultimately lost to Harris English, who made a birdie on the eighth playoff hole. It was the second longest playoff in PGA Tour history.

== Professional wins (3) ==
=== Web.com Tour wins (1) ===
Legend
Finals events (1)
Other Web.com Tour (0)

No.	Date	Tournament	Winning score	To par	Margin of victory	Runners-up
1	Sep 2, 2018	DAP Championship	63-67-68-68=266	−14	3 strokes	(Australia) Matt Jones, (United States) Hunter Mahan

=== PGA Tour Canada wins (2) ===
No.	Date	Tournament	Winning score	To par	Margin of victory	Runner-up
1	Jul 7, 2017	The Players Cup	68-67-68-66=269	−15	3 strokes	(United States) Robby Shelton
2	Sep 10, 2017	Ontario Championship	72-69-64-64=269	−19	Playoff	(United States) Johnny Ruiz

== Playoff record ==
PGA Tour playoff record (0–1)

No.	Year	Tournament	Opponent	Result
1	2021	Travelers Championship	(United States) Harris English	Lost to birdie on eighth extra hole

== Results in major championships ==
Tournament	2022
Masters Tournament	
PGA Championship	T69
U.S. Open	
The Open Championship	

Did not play

"T" = tied

== Results in The Players Championship ==
Tournament	2021	2022	2023
The Players Championship	T58	T42	T44

"T" indicates a tie for a place

== Team appearances ==
Professional

- Aruba Cup (representing PGA Tour Canada): 2017 (winners)

== See also ==
- 2018 Web.com Tour Finals graduates
- 2019 Korn Ferry Tour Finals graduates
