= Cameron Champ =

American professional golfer (born 1995)

Personal information
- Full name: Cameron Mackray Champ
- Nationality: United States
- Born: June 15, 1995 (age 31) Sacramento, California, U.S.

Career
- Sport: Golf
- College: Texas A&M University
- Turned professional: 2017
- Current tour: PGA Tour
- Former tour: Web.com Tour
- Professional wins: 4
- Highest ranking: 66 (July 25, 2021) (as of October 25, 2026)

Number of wins by tour
- PGA Tour: 3
- Korn Ferry Tour: 1

Best results in major championships
- Masters Tournament: T10: 2022
- PGA Championship: T10: 2020
- U.S. Open: T32: 2017
- The Open Championship: DNP

Cameron Mackray Champ (born June 15, 1995) is an American professional golfer from Sacramento, California.

== College career ==
For the Texas A&M Aggies he won the OFCC/Fighting Illini Invitational and finished in the top 10 of six other tournaments. He finished second to Adam Wise in the Pac-12 Robert Brandi Invitational.

== 2017 U.S. Open ==
Champ qualified for the 2017 U.S. Open through sectional qualifying, where he had to compete in a playoff. It was his first major appearance. After two rounds, he was tied for eighth place, and was also leading the driving distance statistics. Along with Scottie Scheffler, he was one of only two amateurs to make the cut. Scheffler finished as the low amateur at 1-under-par, while Champ finished at even-par.

== Professional career ==
In December 2017, Champ tied for 16th in the Web.com Tour Qualifying Tournament. This earned him a place on the Web.com Tour for the start of 2018.

During the 2018 Web.com Tour season, Champ won the 2018 Utah Championship in July 2018. He earned his tour card for the 2018–19 PGA Tour season by earning $253,731 and finishing 6th in the 2018 Web.com Tour regular season.

On October 28, 2018, Champ won his first PGA Tour title by winning the Sanderson Farms Championship with a score of −21. Over and above his win, Champ had an excellent 2018 Fall Series, finishing T25 at the Safeway Open, T28 at the Shriners Hospitals for Children Open, T10 at the Mayakoba Golf Classic and 6th at the RSM Classic. This brought his world ranking up to 97 as of November 19, 2018 and left him 6th on the FedEx Cup standings heading into the 2019 calendar year.

Champ is known for being one of the longest hitters on the PGA Tour. In 2017, Champ registered a 129.79 mph average clubhead speed in his debut at the OHL Classic at Mayakoba.

Champ has worked with instructor Sean Foley since age 14 and although he hits a lower ball flight than the average long hitter on the PGA Tour, Champ was the longest driver on tour for the 2018–19 season with a 317.1 yard average. For the 2018 Web.com tour season, Champ averaged 343.1 yards off the tee and led the 2017 U.S. Open in driving distance at 337 yards.

On September 29, 2019, Champ won the Safeway Open with a birdie at the 72nd hole. It was his first win in a full−strength PGA Tour tournament.

On June 23, 2020, prior to the Travelers Championship, Champ became the second PGA Tour player to test positive for COVID-19 after Nick Watney did the week before.

On July 25, 2021, Champ scored a two stroke victory at the 3M Open after hitting a gap wedge on the 72nd hole from 127 yards to within 3 feet to save par. He had five birdies and no bogeys in his final round to shoot 15-under 269 at TPC Twin Cities. Louis Oosthuizen, Jhonattan Vegas and Charl Schwartzel tied for second.

== Personal life ==
Champ is of mixed black and white descent. His father is biracial (black and white), while Cameron's mother is white. Cameron's father Jeff played two seasons of professional baseball in the Baltimore Orioles organization. Champ supports Black Lives Matter.

== Professional wins (4) ==
=== PGA Tour wins (3) ===
No.	Date	Tournament	Winning score	To par	Margin of victory	Runner(s)-up
1	Oct 28, 2018	Sanderson Farms Championship	65-70-64-68=267	−21	4 strokes	(Canada) Corey Conners
2	Sep 29, 2019	Safeway Open	67-68-67-69=271	−17	1 stroke	(Canada) Adam Hadwin
3	Jul 25, 2021	3M Open	69-67-67-66=269	−15	2 strokes	(South Africa) Louis Oosthuizen, (South Africa) Charl Schwartzel, (Venezuela) Jhonattan Vegas

=== Web.com Tour wins (1) ===
No.	Date	Tournament	Winning score	To par	Margin of victory	Runner-up
1	Jul 15, 2018	Utah Championship	61-64-67-68=260	−24	1 stroke	(United States) Steven Ihm

== Results in major championships ==
Results not in chronological order in 2020.

Tournament	2017	2018
Masters Tournament		
U.S. Open	T32	
The Open Championship		
PGA Championship		

Tournament	2019	2020	2021	2022	2023
Masters Tournament		T19	T26	T10	CUT
PGA Championship	T54	T10	CUT	CUT	
U.S. Open		CUT	CUT		
The Open Championship		NT			

Top 10
Did not play

CUT = missed the half-way cut
"T" = tied
NT = No tournament due to COVID-19 pandemic

=== Summary ===
Tournament	Wins	2nd	3rd	Top-5	Top-10	Top-25	Events	Cuts made
Masters Tournament	0	0	0	0	1	2	4	3
PGA Championship	0	0	0	0	1	1	4	2
U.S. Open	0	0	0	0	0	0	3	1
The Open Championship	0	0	0	0	0	0	0	0
Totals	0	0	0	0	2	3	11	6

- Most consecutive cuts made – 3 (2017 U.S. Open – 2020 PGA)
- Longest streak of top-10s – 1 (twice)

== Results in The Players Championship ==
Tournament	2019	2020	2021	2022
The Players Championship	WD	C	CUT	CUT

CUT = missed the halfway cut
WD = withdrew
C = Canceled after the first round due to the COVID-19 pandemic

== Results in World Golf Championships ==
Tournament	2020	2021
Championship		T48
Match Play	NT^{1}	
Invitational	T25	T31
Champions	NT^{1}	NT^{1}

^{1}Cancelled due to COVID-19 pandemic

Did not play

NT = No tournament
"T" = Tied

== U.S. national team appearances ==
Amateur

- Junior Ryder Cup: 2012 (winners)
- Walker Cup: 2017 (winners)

== See also ==
- 2018 Web.com Tour Finals graduates
