= 2018–19 PGA Tour =

Golf tour season

2018–19 PGA Tour season
- Duration: October 4, 2018 – August 25, 2019
- Number of official events: 46
- Most wins: (United States) Brooks Koepka (3) (Northern Ireland) Rory McIlroy (3)
- FedEx Cup: (Northern Ireland) Rory McIlroy
- Money list: (United States) Brooks Koepka
- PGA Tour Player of the Year: (Northern Ireland) Rory McIlroy
- PGA Player of the Year: (United States) Brooks Koepka
- Rookie of the Year: (South Korea) Im Sung-jae

The 2018–19 PGA Tour was the 104th season of the PGA Tour, the main professional golf tour in the United States. It was also the 51st season since separating from the PGA of America, and the 13th edition of the FedEx Cup.

== Changes for 2018–19 ==
=== Schedule ===
The schedule contained 46 events, two fewer than the previous season. The schedule was shortened in an effort to complete the FedEx Cup Playoffs by the end of August.

As announced in 2017, the PGA Championship was moved from August to May on the weekend before Memorial Day, starting in 2019. The PGA of America cited the addition of golf to the Summer Olympics, as well as cooler weather enabling a wider array of options for host courses, as reasoning for the change. It was also believed that the PGA Tour wished to re-align its season so that the FedEx Cup Playoffs would not have to compete with the start of football season in late-August. Consequently, The Players Championship was moved from May back to March for the first time since 2006.

=== New exemption ===
The PGA Tour added a one-time exemption for those who made 300 career cuts. J. J. Henry was the first to take advantage.

=== Events ===
On hiatus: The Houston Open and Greenbrier Classic were not included in the shortened season, but they did return in the autumn of 2019 as part of the 2019–20 PGA Tour schedule.

New: Two new events were added to the schedule: the Rocket Mortgage Classic, played at Detroit Golf Club in Detroit, Michigan, and the 3M Open, played at the TPC Twin Cities in Blaine, Minnesota.

Relocations: The WGC Invitational was relocated from Akron, Ohio to Memphis, Tennessee when FedEx took over sponsorship of the event.

Canceled: The FedEx St. Jude Classic ceased due to the WGC event; the WGC-FedEx St. Jude Invitational, was played at the Classic's former location in Memphis. The Quicken Loans National; played in the Washington, D.C. area, no longer appeared on the PGA Tour schedule. The FedEx Cup playoff event; the Dell Technologies Championship, was also removed from the schedule with the number of playoff events reducing to three. The Northern Trust alternated between New Jersey, and Boston (the site of the Dell Technologies Championship).

=== Rules ===
From January 1, 2019 onwards, tournaments followed the new rules released by the USGA and The R&A which were designed to speed up the pace of play. The most noticeable changes included golfers being able to putt on the green with the flag remaining in, and drops being made from knee rather than shoulder height.

=== Prize money ===
As well as changes to individual tournament prize funds, the FedEx Cup postseason bonus money increased by $25 million to $60 million, with the FedEx Cup champion getting $15 million. The winner of the Tour Championship will be the FedEx Cup champion. The Tour Championship begins with each player having an adjusted score relative to par which relates to the amount of FedEx Cup points accumulated (previously the Tour Championship was structured similar to other tournaments, and awarded FedEx Cup points). The Tour Championship no longer have its own separate prize fund.

In addition, the Wyndham Rewards Top 10 was introduced, a $10 million bonus to be divided among the FedEx Cup top 10 regular season finishers.

The tour also introduced the Aon Risk Reward Challenge. In most tournaments, a single hole is allocated to contribute to the challenge. A player's best two scores from every participating event a player competes in throughout the season is used. The player with the lowest average to par score wins $1m. The initiative is replicated on the LPGA Tour.

== Schedule ==
The following table lists official events during the 2018–19 season.

Date	Tournament	Location	Purse (US$)	Winner(s) (Note: The number in parentheses after each winner's name is the number of PGA Tour events they had won up to and including that tournament. This information is only shown for PGA Tour members.)	OWGR points	Other tours (Note: ASA − Asian Tour.)	Notes
Oct 7	Safeway Open	California	6,400,000	(United States) Kevin Tway (1)	28		
Oct 14	CIMB Classic	Malaysia	7,000,000	(Australia) Marc Leishman (4)	48	ASA	Limited-field event
Oct 21	CJ Cup	South Korea	9,500,000	(United States) Brooks Koepka (5)	54		Limited-field event
Oct 28	WGC-HSBC Champions	China	10,000,000	(United States) Xander Schauffele (3)	66		World Golf Championship
Oct 28	Sanderson Farms Championship	Mississippi	4,400,000	(United States) Cameron Champ (1)	24		Alternate event
Nov 4	Shriners Hospitals for Children Open	Nevada	7,000,000	(United States) Bryson DeChambeau (5)	40		
Nov 11	Mayakoba Golf Classic	Mexico	7,200,000	(United States) Matt Kuchar (8)	40		
Nov 18	RSM Classic	Georgia	6,400,000	(United States) Charles Howell III (3)	24		
Jan 6	Sentry Tournament of Champions	Hawaii	6,500,000	(United States) Xander Schauffele (4)	56		Winners-only event
Jan 13	Sony Open in Hawaii	Hawaii	6,400,000	(United States) Matt Kuchar (9)	50		
Jan 20	Desert Classic	California	5,900,000	(United States) Adam Long (1)	42		Pro-Am
Jan 27	Farmers Insurance Open	California	7,100,000	(England) Justin Rose (10)	60		
Feb 3	Waste Management Phoenix Open	Arizona	7,100,000	(United States) Rickie Fowler (5)	56		
Feb 11	AT&T Pebble Beach Pro-Am	California	7,600,000	(United States) Phil Mickelson (44)	46		Pro-Am
Feb 17	Genesis Open	California	7,400,000	(United States) J. B. Holmes (5)	64		
Feb 24	WGC-Mexico Championship	Mexico	10,250,000	(United States) Dustin Johnson (20)	72		World Golf Championship
Feb 24	Puerto Rico Open	Puerto Rico	3,000,000	(United States) Martin Trainer (1)	24		Alternate event
Mar 3	The Honda Classic	Florida	6,800,000	(United States) Keith Mitchell (1)	48		
Mar 10	Arnold Palmer Invitational	Florida	9,100,000	(Italy) Francesco Molinari (3)	64		Invitational
Mar 17	The Players Championship	Florida	12,500,000	(Northern Ireland) Rory McIlroy (15)	80		Flagship event
Mar 24	Valspar Championship	Florida	6,700,000	(England) Paul Casey (3)	50		
Mar 31	WGC-Dell Technologies Match Play	Texas	10,250,000	(United States) Kevin Kisner (3)	76		World Golf Championship
Mar 31	Corales Puntacana Resort and Club Championship	Dominican Republic	3,000,000	(Northern Ireland) Graeme McDowell (4)	24		Alternate event
Apr 7	Valero Texas Open	Texas	7,500,000	(Canada) Corey Conners (1)	40		
Apr 14	Masters Tournament	Georgia	11,500,000	(United States) Tiger Woods (81)	100		Major championship
Apr 21	RBC Heritage	South Carolina	6,900,000	(Taiwan) Pan Cheng-tsung (1)	58		Invitational
Apr 28	Zurich Classic of New Orleans	Louisiana	7,300,000	(United States) Ryan Palmer (4) and (Spain) Jon Rahm (3)	n/a		Team event
May 5	Wells Fargo Championship	North Carolina	7,900,000	(United States) Max Homa (1)	50		
May 12	AT&T Byron Nelson	Texas	7,900,000	(South Korea) Kang Sung-hoon (1)	40		
May 19	PGA Championship	New York	11,000,000	(United States) Brooks Koepka (6)	100		Major championship
May 26	Charles Schwab Challenge	Texas	7,300,000	(United States) Kevin Na (3)	54		Invitational
Jun 2	Memorial Tournament	Ohio	9,100,000	(United States) Patrick Cantlay (2)	68		Invitational
Jun 9	RBC Canadian Open	Canada	7,600,000	(Northern Ireland) Rory McIlroy (16)	48		
Jun 16	U.S. Open	California	12,500,000	(United States) Gary Woodland (4)	100		Major championship
Jun 23	Travelers Championship	Connecticut	7,200,000	(United States) Chez Reavie (2)	58		
Jun 30	Rocket Mortgage Classic	Michigan	7,300,000	(United States) Nate Lashley (1)	46		New tournament
Jul 7	3M Open	Minnesota	6,400,000	(United States) Matthew Wolff (1)	44		New tournament
Jul 14	John Deere Classic	Illinois	6,000,000	(South Africa) Dylan Frittelli (1)	24		
Jul 21	The Open Championship	Northern Ireland	10,750,000	(Republic of Ireland) Shane Lowry (2)	100		Major championship
Jul 21	Barbasol Championship	Kentucky	3,500,000	(United States) Jim Herman (2)	24		Alternate event
Jul 28	WGC-FedEx St. Jude Invitational	Tennessee	10,250,000	(United States) Brooks Koepka (7)	72		World Golf Championship
Jul 28	Barracuda Championship	Nevada	3,500,000	(United States) Collin Morikawa (1)	24		Alternate event
Aug 4	Wyndham Championship	North Carolina	6,200,000	(United States) J. T. Poston (1)	44		
Aug 11	The Northern Trust	New Jersey	9,250,000	(United States) Patrick Reed (7)	76		FedEx Cup playoff event
Aug 18	BMW Championship	Illinois	9,250,000	(United States) Justin Thomas (10)	72		FedEx Cup playoff event
Aug 25	Tour Championship	Georgia	n/a (Note: The Tour Championship has no stand-alone purse and does not carry official money; the tournament directly determines the assignment of the FedEx Cup bonus pool money, including US$15,000,000 to the winner.)	(Northern Ireland) Rory McIlroy (17)	60 (Note: OWGR points at the Tour Championship were awarded based on aggregate scores only (see Tour Championship format). McIlroy had the lowest aggregate score and was awarded with the 60 points.)		FedEx Cup playoff event

=== Unofficial events ===
The following events were sanctioned by the PGA Tour, but did not carry FedEx Cup points or official money, nor were wins official.

Date	Tournament	Location	Purse ($)	Winner(s)	OWGR points	Notes
Nov 23	The Match: Tiger vs. Phil	Nevada	9,000,000	(United States) Phil Mickelson	n/a	2-man match
Nov 25	ISPS Handa Melbourne World Cup of Golf	Australia	7,000,000	(Belgium) Thomas Detry and (Belgium) Thomas Pieters	n/a	Team event
Dec 2	Hero World Challenge	Bahamas	3,500,000	(Spain) Jon Rahm	48	Limited-field event
Dec 9	QBE Shootout	Florida	3,300,000	(United States) Brian Harman and (United States) Patton Kizzire	n/a	Team event

== Location of tournaments ==
Location of official tournaments of the 2018–19 PGA Tour in the continental United States and Canada.
600-point event (Players & Majors)
550-point event (World Golf Championships)
500-point event (Regular events)
400-point event (Official team event)
300-point event (Alternate events)
FedEx Cup playoff event
Location of official tournaments of the 2018–19 PGA Tour outside the continental United States and Canada.
600-point event (Players & Majors)
550-point event (World Golf Championships)
500-point event (Regular events)
300-point event (Alternate events)

== FedEx Cup ==
=== Points distribution ===
The distribution of points for 2018–19 PGA Tour events were as follows:

Finishing position	1st	2nd	3rd	4th	5th	6th	7th	8th	9th	10th	20th	30th	40th	50th	60th
Majors & Players Championship	600	330	210	150	120	110	100	94	88	82	51	32	18	10	6
World Golf Championships	550	315	200	140	115	105	95	89	83	78	51	32	18	10	6
Other PGA Tour events	500	300	190	135	110	100	90	85	80	75	45	28	16	8.5	5
Team event (each player)	400	163	105	88	78	68	59	54	50	46	17	5	2	0	0
Alternate events	300	165	105	80	65	60	55	50	45	40	28	17	10	5	3
Playoff events	2000	1200	760	540	440	400	360	340	320	300	180	112	64	34	20

Tour Championship starting score (to par), based on position in the FedEx Cup rankings after the BMW Championship:

Position	1st	2nd	3rd	4th	5th	6th–10th	11th–15th	16th–20th	21st–25th	26th–30th
Starting score	−10	−8	−7	−6	−5	−4	−3	−2	−1	E

=== Final standings ===
For full rankings, see 2019 FedEx Cup Playoffs.

Final FedEx Cup standings of the 30 qualifiers for the Tour Championship:

Pos.	Player		Majors & The Players					WGCs				Top 10s in other PGA Tour events							Regular season points	Playoffs (Note: The top 125 point scorers in the regular season retain their tour card for the following season, and qualify for The Northern Trust. The top 70 points scorers after The Northern Trust qualify for the BMW Championship.)		Total points	Tour C'ship (Note: The top 30 point scorers after the BMW Championship qualify for the Tour Championship. Each player begins with a score adjustment to par determined by their point ranking, the lowest scorers in the Tour Championship in addition to this adjustment win the FedEx Cup.)		Tmts	Money ($m) (Note: In addition to tournament prize money, the top 10 regular season point scorers receive a share of a US$15,000,000 bonus, and the US$60,000,000 FedEx Cup postseason bonus money is distributed based upon standings after the Tour Championship.)		
Pos.	Nat.	Name	Ply	Mas	PGA	USO	Opn	WGC Cha	WGC Mex	WGC MP	WGC Inv	1	2	3	4	5	6	7	Regular season points	NTr	BMW	Total points	Start	Final	Tmts	Basic	Wynd Top10	FedEx Bonus
1	(Northern Ireland)	McIlroy	1st	T21	T8	T9	CUT	T54	2nd	T9	T4	T4	T5	T4	T6	T9	1st		2,315	T6	T19	2,842	−5	−18	19	7.79	1.50	15.00
2	(United States)	Schauffele	CUT	T2	T16	T3	T41	1st	T14	T24	T27	1st	T10						1,858	CUT	T16	2,030	−4	−14	21	5.61	1.10	5.00
T3	(United States)	Koepka	T56	T2	1st	2nd	T4	T16	T27	T56	1st	1st	T2	4th					2,887	T30	T24	3,119	−7	−13	21	9.68	2.00 (Note: Koepka also won a further US$1,000,000 by topping the Aon Risk Reward Challenge standings.)	3.50
T3	(United States)	Thomas	T35	T12	•	CUT	T11	•	9th	T24	T12	T5	3rd	3rd	2nd				1,247	T12	1st	3,475	−10	−13	20	5.01		3.50
5	(England)	Casey	CUT	CUT	T29	T21	T57	T16	T3	T9	T27	2nd	1st	T4	T5				1,629	•	T24	1,768	−2	−9	22	4.26	0.60	2.50
6	(Australia)	Scott	T12	T18	T8	T7	CUT	T18	•	•	T40	T10	2nd	T7	2nd				1,124	5th	T9	1,874	−3	−8	18	4.08		1.90
7	(United States)	Finau	T22	T5	T64	CUT	3rd	2nd	T25	T40	T27	2nd							1,279	T30	4th	1,911	−3	−7	25	4.34		1.30
8	(United States)	Reavie	CUT	•	T14	T3	CUT	T35	T65	T56	T27	T7	T3	T4	1st				1,309	T38	T57	1,394	−1	−6	28	3.66		1.10
T9	(United States)	Kisner	T22	T21	CUT	T49	T30	•	T27	1st	T27	T7	T5						1,098	T12	T9	1,639	−2	−5	25	3.49		0.84
T9	(Japan)	Matsuyama	T8	T32	T16	T21	CUT	T30	T19	T24	T43	T3	T9	6th	T7				969	T59	3rd	1,821	−3	−5	24	3.34		0.84
T9	(United States)	Reed	T47	T36	CUT	T32	10th	T7	T14	T24	T12	T5							774	1st	T19	2,946	−6	−5	25	3.59		0.84
T12	(United States)	DeChambeau	T20	T29	CUT	T35	CUT	•	T56	T40	T48	1st	7th	T10	T8	T2			1,203	T24	T48	1,371	E	−4	21	3.19		0.68
T12	(Spain)	Rahm	T12	T9	CUT	T3	T11	T22	T45	T24	7th	T8	6th	T5	T10	T9	T6	1st	1,447	T3	T5	2,517	−4	−4	20	4.99	0.50	0.68
14	(United States)	Kokrak	T47	•	T23	•	T32	•	•	•	•	T9	T10	T2	T7	T6			721	T12	T19	1,254	E	−3	24	2.33		0.62
15	(United States)	Woodland	T30	T32	T8	1st	CUT	•	T17	T17	T55	T5	2nd	T10	2nd	T9	T7		1,795	T52	T31	1,912	−3	−2	24	5.69	1.00	0.60
T16	(England)	Fleetwood	T5	T36	T48	T65	2nd	T7	T19	T24	T4	T3	2nd						1,193	T43	T11	1,479	−1	−1	18	3.85		0.55
T16	(United States)	Kuchar	T26	T12	T8	T16	T41	•	50th	2nd	T43	1st	1st	T4	T7	2nd	T4		2,313	CUT	T52	2,339	−4	−1	22	6.29	1.20	0.55
T16	(United States)	Simpson	T16	T5	T29	T16	T30	•	T39	T56	2nd	3rd	T8	T2	2nd				1,619	T18	T24	1,946	−4	−1	21	4.69	0.55	0.55
T19	(United States)	Fowler	T47	T9	T36	T43	T6	•	T36	•	•	T4	1st	T2	T4				1,391	CUT	T11	1,637	−2	E	20	3.95		0.51
T19	(South Korea)	Im	CUT	•	CUT	•	CUT	•	•	•	•	T4	T7	T3	T4	T7	7th	T6	1,097	T38	T11	1,407	−1	E	35	2.85		0.51
T21	(Mexico)	Ancer	T12	•	T16	T49	CUT	•	T39	T17	•	T5	T4	T8					622	2nd	T28	1,940	−4	+1	27	2.69		0.48
T21	(United States)	Cantlay	CUT	T9	T3	T21	T41	T7	T6	T24	T12	2nd	T9	T3	1st				1,730	T12	2nd	3,157	−8	+1	21	6.12	0.85	0.48
T21	(South Africa)	Oosthuizen	T56	T29	T60	T7	T20	•	T25	T5	T20	T5	T2						754	T6	T11	1,355	E	+1	19	2.94		0.48
T24	(Australia)	Leishman	CUT	T49	CUT	T35	CUT	•	T62	T9	3rd	1st	T4	T3	T4	5th			1,415	CUT	T19	1,587	−1	+2	21	3.89		0.45
T24	(United States)	Snedeker	T5	CUT	T16	77th	CUT	T30	•	T24	T27	T2	T4	T5					934	T6	T5	1,709	−2	+2	27	3.12		0.45
T26	(Canada)	Conners	T41	T46	T64	•	CUT	•	•	•	T27	2nd	T3	1st					962	T21	T7	1,476	−1	+3	28	2.92		0.43
T26	(England)	Rose	T8	CUT	T29	T3	T20	3rd	•	T9	11th	1st	3rd						1,423	T10	T52	1,739	−2	+3	17	4.36		0.43
28	(United States)	Howell III	T35	T32	T41	T52	•	•	T14	T24	•	T5	1st	T8	6th	T6			1,279	CUT	T37	1,345	E	+4	27	3.04		0.43
T29	(United States)	Glover	CUT	•	T16	CUT	T20	•	•	•	•	T7	T7	T4	T10	T7	T10		944	T43	T7	1,337	E	+10	26	2.61		0.40
T29	(United States)	D. Johnson	T5	T2	2nd	T35	T51	T30	1st	T40	T20	T4	T9	T6					1,686	T24	T57	1,840	−3	+10	19	5.53	0.70	0.40

Win
Top 10
Made cut
Missed cut
• Did not play

== Money list ==
The money list was based on prize money won during the season, calculated in U.S. dollars.

Position	Player	Prize money ($)
1	(United States) Brooks Koepka	9,684,006
2	(Northern Ireland) Rory McIlroy	7,785,286
3	(United States) Matt Kuchar	6,294,690
4	(United States) Patrick Cantlay	6,121,488
5	(United States) Gary Woodland	5,690,965
6	(United States) Xander Schauffele	5,609,456
7	(United States) Dustin Johnson	5,534,619
8	(United States) Justin Thomas	5,013,084
9	(Spain) Jon Rahm	4,990,110
10	(United States) Webb Simpson	4,690,572

== Awards ==
Award	Winner	Ref.
PGA Tour Player of the Year (Jack Nicklaus Trophy)	(Northern Ireland) Rory McIlroy	
PGA Player of the Year	(United States) Brooks Koepka	
Rookie of the Year (Arnold Palmer Award)	(South Korea) Im Sung-jae	
Scoring leader (PGA Tour – Byron Nelson Award)	(Northern Ireland) Rory McIlroy	
Scoring leader (PGA – Vardon Trophy)	(Northern Ireland) Rory McIlroy	

== See also ==
- 2018 in golf
- 2019 in golf
- 2019 Korn Ferry Tour
- 2019 PGA Tour Champions season
- List of 2019 PGA Tour card holders
