= Procore Championship =

American PGA Tour golf tournament

Coordinates: 38.349°N 122.264°W

Tournament information
- Location: Napa, California
- Established: 2007
- Courses: Silverado Country Club (North Course)
- Par: 72
- Length: 7,138 yards (6,527 m)
- Tour: PGA Tour
- Format: Stroke play
- Prize fund: US$6,000,000
- Month played: September
- Final year: 2025

Tournament record score
- Aggregate: 262 Cameron Beckman (2008); 262 Kevin Sutherland (2008); 262 Troy Matteson (2009); 262 Rickie Fowler (2009); 262 Jamie Lovemark (2009)
- To par: −21 Stewart Cink (2020) −21 Sahith Theegala (2023)

Current champion
- (United States) Scottie Scheffler

Final champion
- Location in the United States Location in California

The Procore Championship, previously the Fortinet Championship and the Safeway Open, was a professional golf tournament, part of the PGA Tour. Originally sponsored by Fry's Electronics, it was first staged in 2007 as the Fry's Electronics Open at Grayhawk Golf Club's Raptor Course in Scottsdale, Arizona. It was renamed to the Frys.com Open in 2008 and moved to California in 2010, to CordeValle Golf Club in San Martin, southeast of San Jose. In October 2014, part of the PGA Tour's 2015 season, it moved north to Napa and the Silverado Country Club (North course).

Beginning with the October 2016 tournament, part of the PGA Tour's 2017 season, the primary sponsor was Safeway Inc., and that continued through 2020. In 2021 Fortinet became the title sponsor on a six-year deal.

== History ==
Silverado's North Course hosted an annual event on the PGA Tour from 1968 through 1980, the first nine editions as the Kaiser International Open Invitational. In 1977, that event was renamed the Anheuser-Busch Golf Classic and in 1981 it moved east to Kingsmill in Williamsburg, Virginia, where it was played through 2002.

The Frys.com Open began as a PGA Tour Fall Series event, from 2007 through 2012. Starting in October 2013, when the PGA Tour changed its "year" to begin in October, rather than January, the tournament became the opening event of the PGA Tour season, and FedEx Cup points were awarded to players.

The inaugural event in October 2007, at Grayhawk Golf Club's Raptor Course in Scottsdale, Arizona, was won by Mike Weir by one stroke over Mark Hensby. The 2008 event was won by Cameron Beckman on the second playoff hole, when Kevin Sutherland bogeyed it. In 2009, Troy Matteson set a PGA Tour 36-hole record of 122 with 61 in both the second and third rounds, and then won in a three-man playoff against Rickie Fowler and Jamie Lovemark. At CordeValle in San Martin in 2012, John Mallinger shot a 62, matching the course record; it was his PGA Tour best round.

In 2013, tournament organizers had a long-term goal to stage the event at The Institute Golf Course in Morgan Hill, a course owned by John Fry, when facilities were completed there. That was expected in 2016 or 2017, but did not happen because of the change of sponsorship to Safeway in 2016.

In July 2024, it was announced that Procore would become the title sponsor for the 2024 event.

== Winners ==
Year	Winner	Score	To par	Margin of victory	Runner(s)-up	Purse ($)	Winner's share ($)
Procore Championship
2025	(United States) Scottie Scheffler	269	−19	1 stroke	(United States) Ben Griffin	6,000,000	1,080,000
2024	(United States) Patton Kizzire	268	−20	5 strokes	(United States) David Lipsky	6,000,000	1,080,000
Fortinet Championship
2023	(United States) Sahith Theegala	267	−21	2 strokes	(South Korea) Kim Seong-hyeon	8,400,000	1,512,000
2022	(United States) Max Homa (2)	272	−16	1 stroke	(England) Danny Willett	8,000,000	1,440,000
2021	(United States) Max Homa	269	−19	1 stroke	(United States) Maverick McNealy	7,000,000	1,260,000
Safeway Open
2020	(United States) Stewart Cink	267	−21	2 strokes	(United States) Harry Higgs	6,600,000	1,188,000
2019	(United States) Cameron Champ	271	−17	1 stroke	(Canada) Adam Hadwin	6,600,000	1,188,000
2018	(United States) Kevin Tway	274	−14	Playoff	(United States) Ryan Moore (United States) Brandt Snedeker	6,400,000	1,152,000
2017	(United States) Brendan Steele (2)	273	−15	2 strokes	(United States) Tony Finau	6,200,000	1,116,000
2016	(United States) Brendan Steele	270	−18	1 stroke	(United States) Patton Kizzire	6,000,000	1,080,000
Frys.com Open
2015	(Argentina) Emiliano Grillo	273	−15	Playoff	(United States) Kevin Na	6,000,000	1,080,000
2014	(South Korea) Bae Sang-moon	273	−15	2 strokes	(Australia) Steven Bowditch	6,000,000	1,080,000
2013	(United States) Jimmy Walker	267	−17	2 strokes	(Fiji) Vijay Singh	5,000,000	900,000
2012	(Sweden) Jonas Blixt	268	−16	1 stroke	(United States) Jason Kokrak (United States) Tim Petrovic	5,000,000	900,000
2011	(United States) Bryce Molder	267	−17	Playoff	(United States) Briny Baird	5,000,000	900,000
2010	(United States) Rocco Mediate	269	−15	1 stroke	(United States) Alex Prugh (United States) Bo Van Pelt	5,000,000	900,000
2009	(United States) Troy Matteson	262	−18	Playoff	(United States) Rickie Fowler (United States) Jamie Lovemark	5,000,000	900,000
2008	(United States) Cameron Beckman	262	−18	Playoff	(United States) Kevin Sutherland	5,000,000	900,000
Fry's Electronics Open
2007	(Canada) Mike Weir	266	−14	1 stroke	(Australia) Mark Hensby	5,000,000	900,000

Note: Green highlight indicates scoring records.
