= Martin Trainer =

French professional golfer (born 1991)

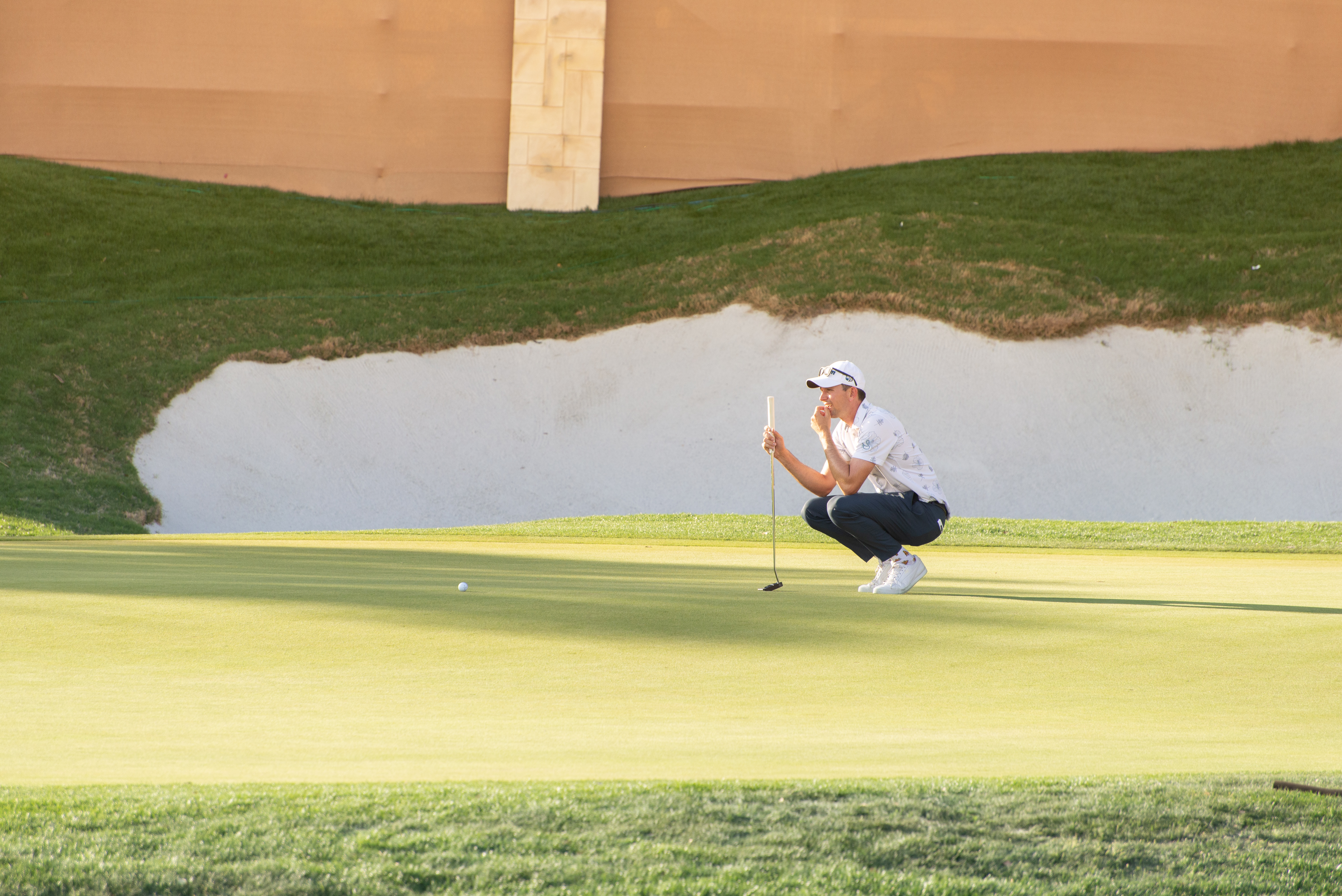

Personal information
- Full name: Martin Daniel Trainer
- Nationality: United States (until Sep 2022); France (since Oct 2022)
- Born: April 15, 1991 (age 35) Marseille, France
- Height: 6 ft 1 in (1.85 m)
- Weight: 175 lb (79 kg; 12.5 st)

Career
- Sport: Golf
- College: University of Southern California
- Turned professional: 2013
- Former tours: PGA Tour; European Tour; Web.com Tour; PGA Tour Latinoamérica; Gateway Tour
- Professional wins: 6

Number of wins by tour
- PGA Tour: 1
- Korn Ferry Tour: 2
- Other: 3

Best results in major championships
- Masters Tournament: DNP
- PGA Championship: CUT: 2019
- U.S. Open: DNP
- The Open Championship: DNP

Martin Daniel Trainer (born April 15, 1991) is a French-American professional golfer who won his first PGA Tour event at the 2019 Puerto Rico Open, which was an alternate event.

== Early life and career ==
Trainer was born in Marseille, France. He graduated from Henry M. Gunn High School in Palo Alto, California in 2009. He graduated from University of Southern California with a degree in Business Administration. His father is American and his mother French. He has dual American and French citizenship.

Trainer claimed his first PGA Tour win in 2019 at the Puerto Rico Open.

In May 2026, Trainer announced his retirement from professional golf.

== Nationality change ==
In October 2022, it was reported that Trainer had changed his sporting nationality from the United States to France, having been eligible to do so by being born in Marseille and his mother also being French. He applied to the International Golf Federation in July 2022 to switch representation.

== Professional wins (6) ==
=== PGA Tour wins (1) ===
No.	Date	Tournament	Winning score	Margin of victory	Runners-up
1	Feb 24, 2019	Puerto Rico Open	−15 (70-67-69-67=273)	3 strokes	(Australia) Aaron Baddeley, (United States) Daniel Berger, (Canada) Roger Sloan, (United States) Johnson Wagner

PGA Tour playoff record (0–1)

No.	Year	Tournament	Opponents	Result
1	2024	Zurich Classic of New Orleans (with (United States) Chad Ramey)	(Republic of Ireland) Shane Lowry and (Northern Ireland) Rory McIlroy	Lost to par on first extra hole

=== Web.com Tour wins (2) ===
No.	Date	Tournament	Winning score	Margin of victory	Runner-up
1	Mar 11, 2018	El Bosque Mexico Championship	−14 (67-70-68-69=274)	2 strokes	(United States) John Chin
2	Jul 29, 2018	Price Cutter Charity Championship	−25 (62-68-65-68=263)	1 stroke	(Sweden) Henrik Norlander

=== PGA Tour Latinoamérica wins (1) ===
No.	Date	Tournament	Winning score	Margin of victory	Runner-up
1	May 29, 2016	Mazatlán Open	−15 (71-66-71-65=273)	1 stroke	(Argentina) Leandro Marelli

=== Chilean Tour wins (1) ===
No.	Date	Tournament	Winning score	Margin of victory	Runner-up
1	Nov 23, 2014	Abierto de Prince of Wales Country Club	−10 (64-72-70=206)	1 stroke	(Chile) Santiago Russi

=== Gateway Tour wins (1) ===
- 2013 Arizona Fall 4

== Results in major championships ==
Tournament	2019
Masters Tournament	
PGA Championship	CUT
U.S. Open	
The Open Championship	

Did not play

CUT = missed the half-way cut

== Results in The Players Championship ==
Tournament	2019
The Players Championship	T41

"T" indicates a tie for a place

== Gallery ==
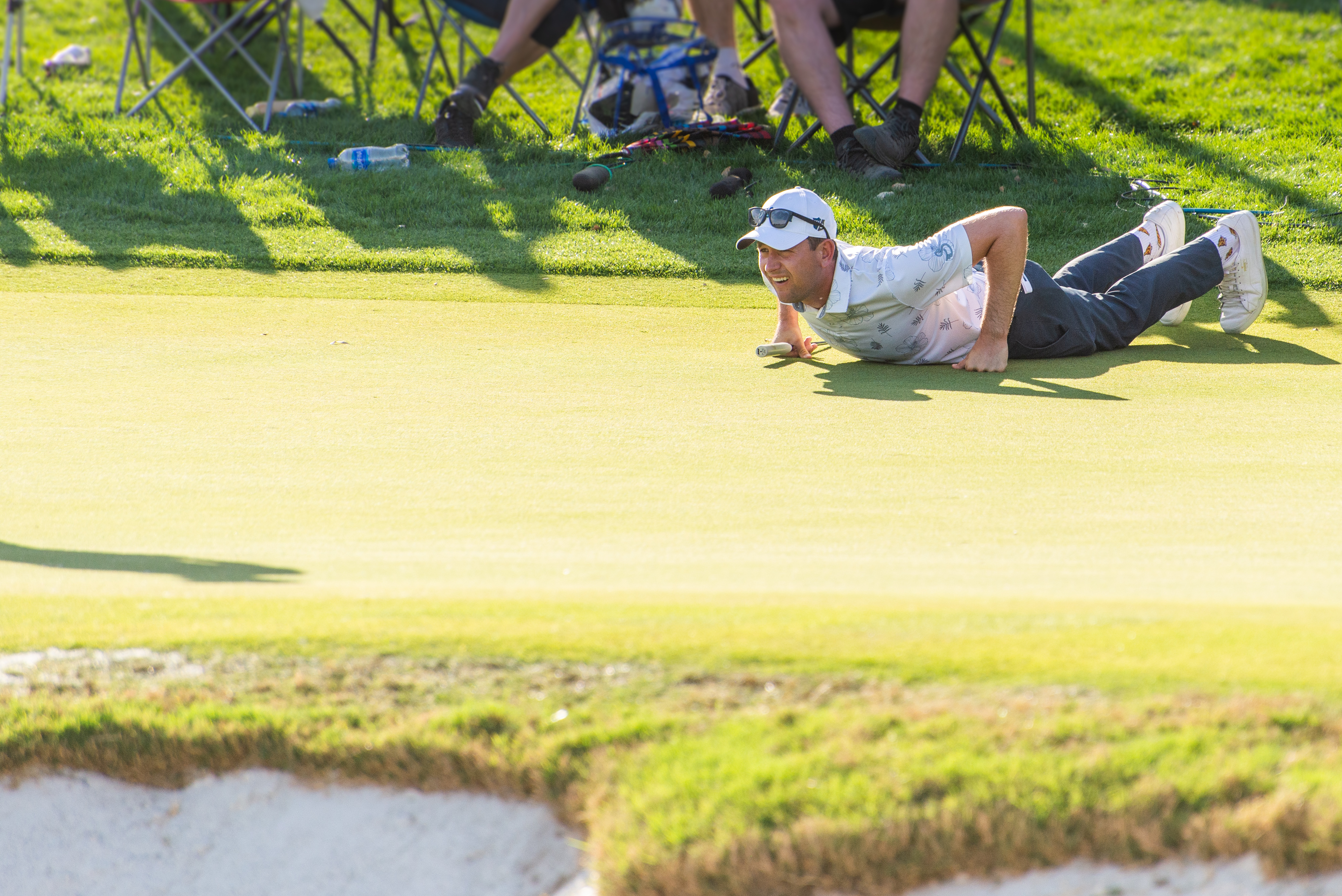

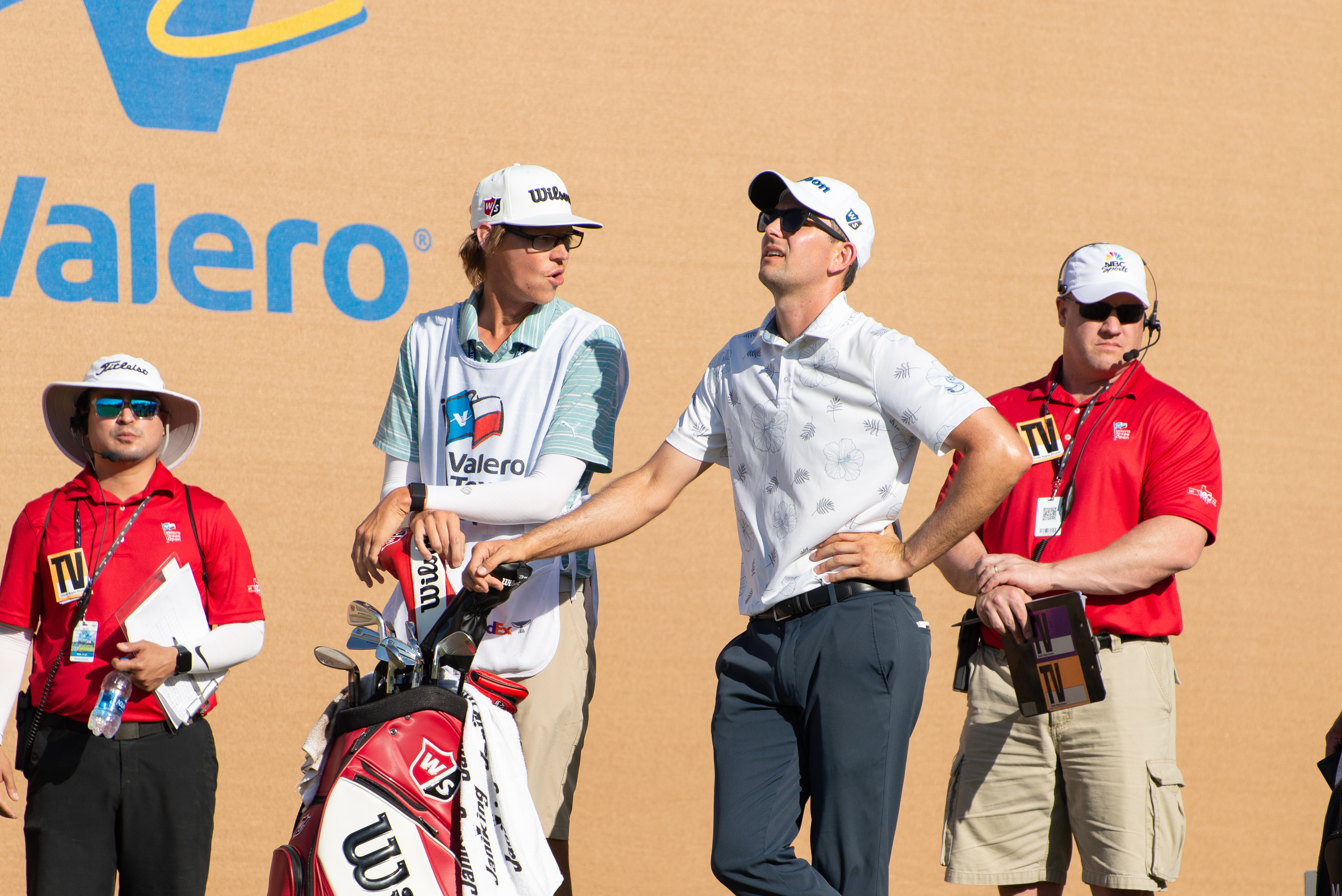

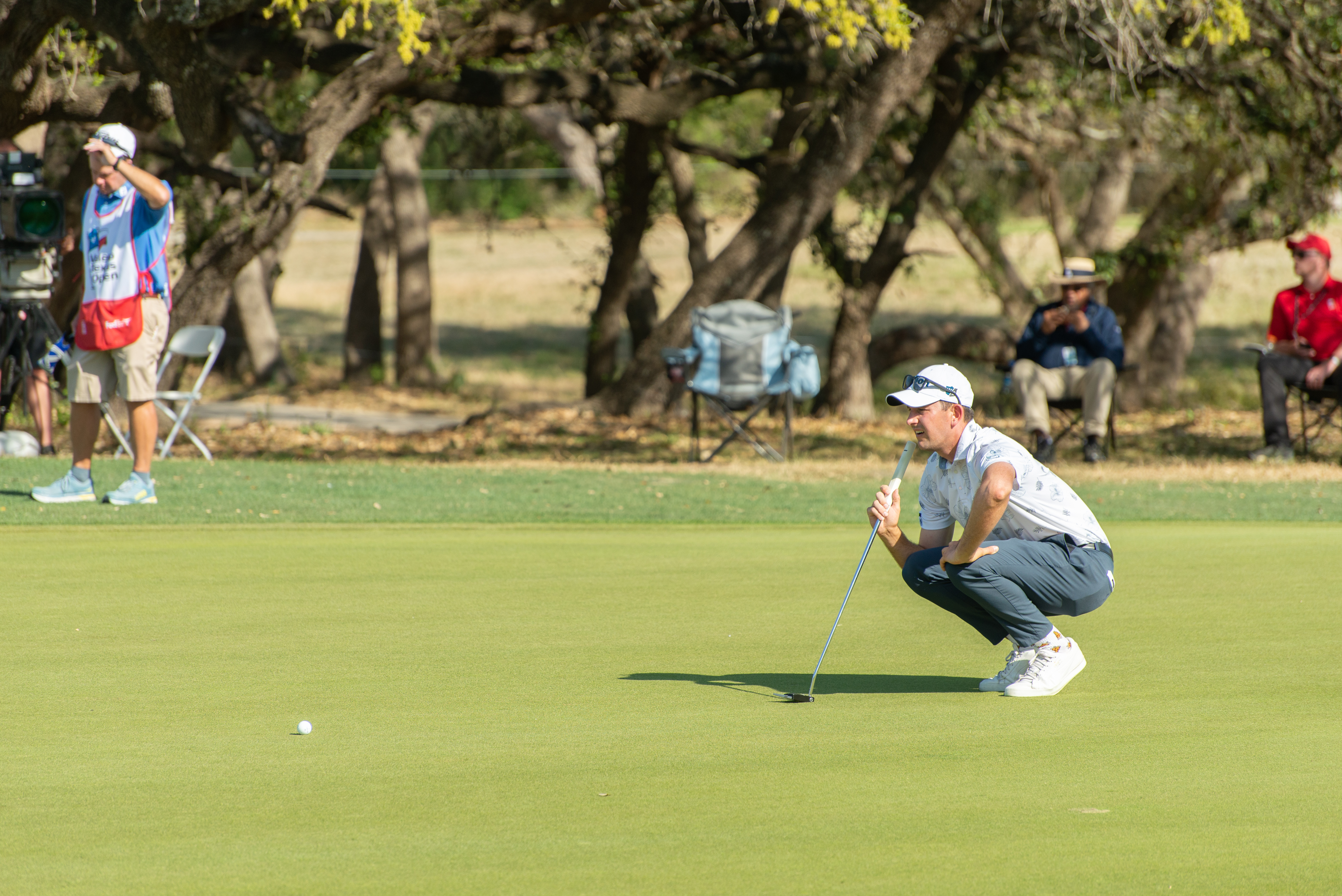

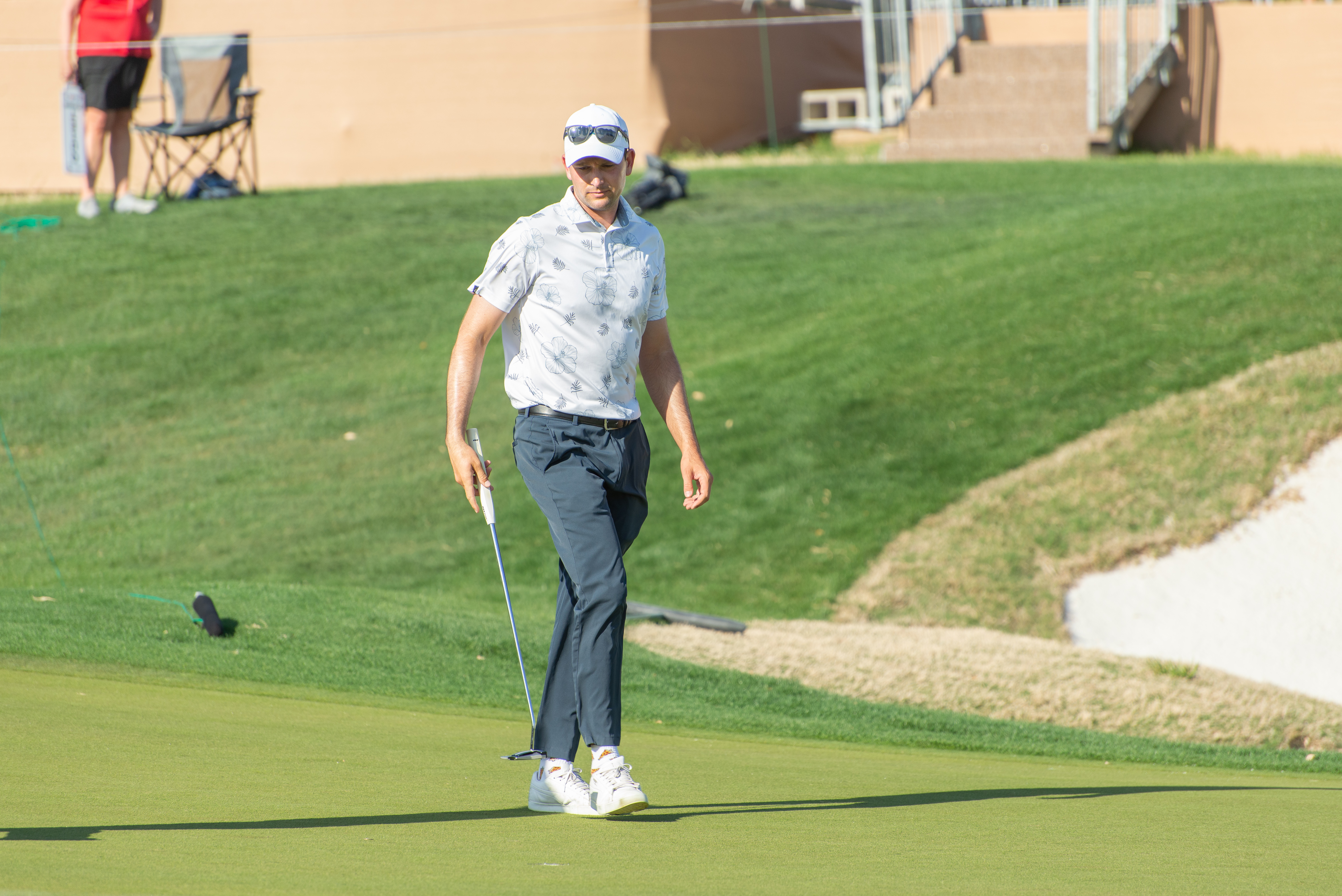

== See also ==
- 2018 Web.com Tour Finals graduates
