= 2018 Web.com Tour =

Golf tour season

2018 Web.com Tour season
- Duration: January 13, 2018 – September 23, 2018
- Number of official events: 27
- Most wins: (South Korea) Im Sung-jae (2) (United States) Martin Trainer (2)
- Regular season money list: (South Korea) Im Sung-jae
- Finals money list: (United States) Denny McCarthy
- Player of the Year: (South Korea) Im Sung-jae
- Rookie of the Year: (South Korea) Im Sung-jae

The 2018 Web.com Tour was the 29th season of the Web.com Tour, the official development tour to the PGA Tour.

== Schedule ==
The following table lists official events during the 2018 season.

Date	Tournament	Location	Purse (US$)	Winner (Note: The number in parentheses after each winner's name is the number of Web.com Tour events they had won up to and including that tournament. This information is only shown for Web.com Tour members. It is rare for someone to accumulate many wins on the Web.com Tour as success at this level usually leads to promotion to the PGA Tour.)	OWGR points	Notes
Jan 16	The Bahamas Great Exuma Classic	Bahamas	600,000	(South Korea) Im Sung-jae (1)	14	
Jan 24	The Bahamas Great Abaco Classic	Bahamas	600,000	(Canada) Adam Svensson (1)	14	
Feb 4	Panama Championship	Panama	625,000	(United States) Scott Langley (1)	14	
Feb 11	Club Colombia Championship	Colombia	700,000	(England) Ben Taylor (1)	14	
Mar 11	El Bosque Mexico Championship	Mexico	650,000	(United States) Martin Trainer (1)	14	
Mar 25	Chitimacha Louisiana Open	Louisiana	550,000	(Argentina) Julián Etulain (1)	14	
Apr 1	Savannah Golf Championship	Georgia	550,000	(United States) Sam Burns (1)	14	New tournament
Apr 22	North Mississippi Classic	Mississippi	550,000	(United States) Eric Axley (2)	14	New tournament
Apr 29	United Leasing & Finance Championship	Indiana	600,000	(Mexico) José de Jesús Rodríguez (1)	14	
May 13	Knoxville Open	Tennessee	550,000	(Germany) Stephan Jäger (4)	14	
May 20	BMW Charity Pro-Am	South Carolina	700,000	(United States) Michael Arnaud (1)	14	Pro-Am
May 27	Nashville Golf Open	Tennessee	550,000	(Australia) Cameron Davis (1)	14	
Jun 3	Rex Hospital Open	North Carolina	650,000	(United States) Joey Garber (1)	14	
Jun 10	Rust-Oleum Championship	Illinois	600,000	(United States) Chase Wright (1)	14	
Jun 24	Wichita Open	Kansas	625,000	(United States) Brady Schnell (1)	14	
Jul 1	Lincoln Land Championship	Illinois	550,000	(United States) Anders Albertson (1)	14	
Jul 8	LECOM Health Challenge	New York	600,000	(Argentina) Nelson Ledesma (1)	14	
Jul 15	Utah Championship	Utah	700,000	(United States) Cameron Champ (1)	14	
Jul 22	Pinnacle Bank Championship	Nebraska	600,000	(England) David Skinns (1)	14	
Jul 29	Price Cutter Charity Championship	Missouri	675,000	(United States) Martin Trainer (2)	14	
Aug 5	KC Golf Classic	Kansas	675,000	(Austria) Sepp Straka (1)	14	
Aug 12	Ellie Mae Classic	California	600,000	(United States) Trevor Cone (1)	14	
Aug 19	WinCo Foods Portland Open	Oregon	800,000	(South Korea) Im Sung-jae (2)	14	
Aug 26	Nationwide Children's Hospital Championship	Ohio	1,000,000	(United States) Robert Streb (2)	16	Finals event
Sep 2	DAP Championship	Ohio	1,000,000	(United States) Kramer Hickok (1)	16	Finals event
Sep 16	Albertsons Boise Open	Idaho	1,000,000	(South Korea) Bae Sang-moon (1)	16	Finals event
Sep 23	Web.com Tour Championship	Florida	1,000,000	(United States) Denny McCarthy (1)	20	Finals event

== Location of tournaments ==
Location of tournaments of the 2018 Web.com Tour in the United States and the Bahamas.
Regular-season events
Regular-season finale
Finals events
Location of tournaments of the 2018 Web.com Tour outside the United States and the Bahamas.

== Money list ==
=== Regular season money list ===
The regular season money list was based on prize money won during the season, calculated in U.S. dollars. The top 25 players on the regular season money list earned status to play on the 2018–19 PGA Tour.

Position	Player	Prize money ($)
1	(South Korea) Im Sung-jae	534,326
2	(United States) Sam Burns	291,878
3	(United States) Scott Langley	279,732
4	(United States) Martin Trainer	267,000
5	(South Korea) Lee Kyoung-hoon	259,096

=== Finals money list ===
The Finals money list was based on prize money won during the Web.com Tour Finals, calculated in U.S. dollars. The top 25 players on the Finals money list (not otherwise exempt) earned status to play on the 2018–19 PGA Tour.

Position	Player	Prize money ($)
1	(United States) Denny McCarthy	255,793
2	(United States) Kramer Hickok	221,333
3	(South Korea) Bae Sang-moon	218,156
4	(United States) Robert Streb	187,460
5	(United States) Peter Malnati	157,296

== Awards ==
Award	Winner	Ref.
Player of the Year (Jack Nicklaus Trophy)	(South Korea) Im Sung-jae	
Rookie of the Year	(South Korea) Im Sung-jae	
