= Martin Piller =

American golfer

Personal information
- Full name: Martin Stuart Piller
- Nationality: United States
- Born: November 14, 1985 (age 40) Dallas, Texas, U.S.
- Height: 5 ft 9 in (1.75 m)
- Weight: 155 lb (70 kg; 11.1 st)
- Spouse: Gerina Piller (since 2011)
- Children: 1

Career
- Sport: Golf
- College: Texas A&M University
- Turned professional: 2008
- Current tour: PGA Tour
- Former tour: Web.com Tour
- Professional wins: 7

Number of wins by tour
- Korn Ferry Tour: 6 (Tied 2nd all time)
- Other: 1

Martin Stuart Piller (born November 14, 1985) is an American professional golfer.

== Early life and amateur career ==
Piller was born in Dallas, Texas and grew up in Duncanville, Texas. He graduated from Texas A&M University.

== Professional career ==
In 2008, Piller turned professional. He won his first start as a pro at the Texas State Open.

Piller has played on the Nationwide Tour since 2009. His first win on Tour was the 2010 Stadion Athens Classic at UGA. He finished the year 8th on the money list and earned his 2011 PGA Tour card.

== Personal life ==
In January 2011, Piller married Gerina Mendoza, who was a rookie on the LPGA Tour in 2011. The couple has one child, a son, Ajeo James, born April 26, 2018.

== Professional wins (7) ==
=== Web.com Tour wins (6) ===
No.	Date	Tournament	Winning score	To par	Margin of victory	Runner-up
1	May 2, 2010	Stadion Classic at UGA	67-70-64-71=272	−12	1 stroke	(United States) Daniel Summerhays
2	Aug 1, 2010	Cox Classic	69-66-62-64=261	−23	2 strokes	(United States) Dicky Pride
3	Aug 17, 2014	News Sentinel Open	65-67-67-63=262	−22	2 strokes	(United States) Bronson Burgoon
4	Jul 12, 2015	Albertsons Boise Open	61-63-65-67=256	−28	6 strokes	(Argentina) Jorge Fernández-Valdés
5	Aug 9, 2015	Digital Ally Open	65-62-66-65=258	−26	4 strokes	(United States) Darron Stiles
6	Aug 6, 2017	Ellie Mae Classic	68-62-68-64=262	−18	1 stroke	(United States) Brandon Harkins

=== Other wins (1) ===
- 2008 Texas State Open

== See also ==
- 2010 Nationwide Tour graduates
- 2015 Web.com Tour Finals graduates
- 2017 Web.com Tour Finals graduates
- List of golfers with most Web.com Tour wins
