= 2025 Players Championship =

Golf tournament

Tournament information
- Dates: March 13–16, 2025
- Location: Ponte Vedra Beach, Florida; 30.198°N 81.394°W
- Courses: TPC Sawgrass (Stadium Course)
- Tour: PGA Tour

Statistics
- Par: 72
- Field: 144 players, 72 after cut
- Cut: 143 (−1)
- Prize fund: $25,000,000
- Winner's share: $4,500,000

Champion
- (Northern Ireland) Rory McIlroy
- 276 (−12), playoff

Location map
- Location in the United States Location in Florida

The 2025 Players Championship was the 51st edition of The Players Championship (the 48th as a standalone tournament), held from March 13–16 at TPC Sawgrass in Ponte Vedra Beach, Florida. Rory McIlroy earned his second Players title in a three-hole aggregate playoff against J. J. Spaun after both finished at 12-under-par 276. A four-hour weather delay during the final round forced the playoff into Monday, marking the tournament’s first playoff since 2015. Two-time defending champion Scottie Scheffler placed eight strokes behind in a tie for twentieth.

The event offered a record-high purse of $25 million, including a $4.5 million winner’s share. The field of 144 players met various PGA Tour eligibility criteria, with the cut falling at one-under 143. In the second round, Justin Thomas tied the TPC Sawgrass course record with a score of 62.

== Venue ==
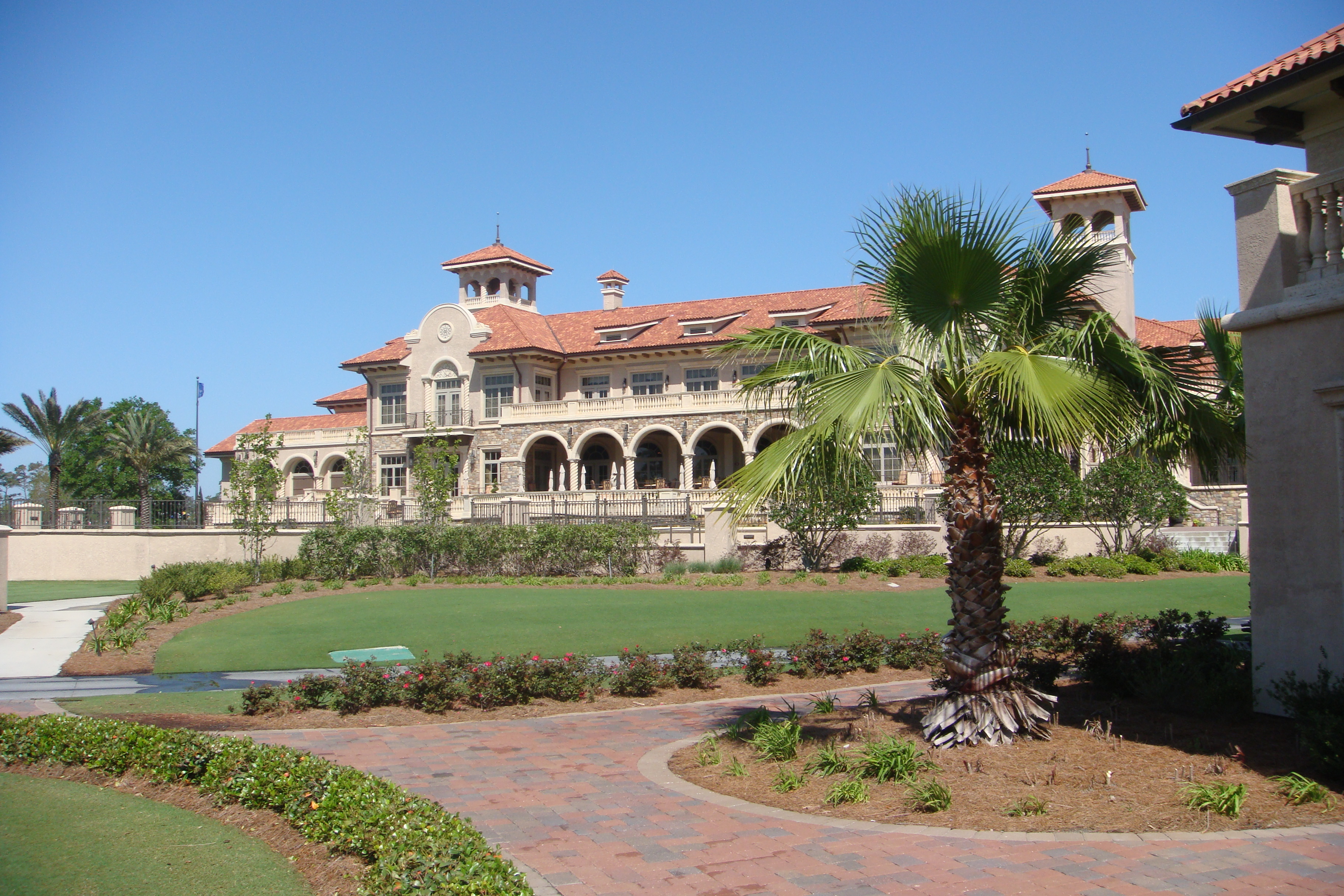
The Tournament Players Club Sawgrass (TPC Sawgrass) is a golf course in the southeastern United States, located in Ponte Vedra Beach, Florida, southeast of Jacksonville.

An overhanging limb on a tree at the tee box of the 6th hole was restored prior to the competition, with the tee box also moved back 20 feet. Five holes were lengthened by a total of 75 yards through a mix of tee box extensions and other adjustments: the 2nd, 6th, 11th, 14th, and 16th.

== Field ==
The field consisted of 144 players meeting various criteria; they included tournament winners on the PGA Tour since the previous Players Championship, recent winners of major championships, The Players and World Golf Championships, and leading players in the FedEx Cup standings from the current and preceding seasons.

=== Eligibility criteria ===
This list details the eligibility criteria for the 2025 Players Championship and the players who qualified under them; any additional criteria under which players are eligible is indicated in parentheses.

1. Winners of PGA Tour events since the 2024 Players Championship

- Ludvig Åberg (11,13,15,16)
- Akshay Bhatia (13,15)
- Keegan Bradley (13,15)
- Brian Campbell
- Rafael Campos (13)
- Cameron Davis (13,15)
- Thomas Detry (13,15,16)
- Nick Dunlap (13,15)
- Nico Echavarría (13,15)
- Austin Eckroat (13,15)
- Harris English (13,15,16)
- Chris Gotterup (13)
- Harry Hall (13)
- Russell Henley (9,13,15)
- Joe Highsmith (13,15,16)
- Billy Horschel (10,13,15)
- Stephan Jäger (13,15)
- Patton Kizzire (13)
- Shane Lowry (6,13,15)
- Robert MacIntyre (13,15)
- Peter Malnati (13)
- Hideki Matsuyama (2,11,13,15,16)
- Matt McCarty (13,19)
- Rory McIlroy (3,7,13,15,16)
- Maverick McNealy (13,15,16)
- Taylor Pendrith (13,15)
- J. T. Poston (13,15)
- Aaron Rai (13,15)
- Davis Riley (13)
- Xander Schauffele (5,6,13,15)
- Scottie Scheffler (2,3,7,8,9,10,12,13,15)
- Sepp Straka (13,15,16)
- Nick Taylor (13,15,16)
- Davis Thompson (13)
- Jhonattan Vegas (13)
- Karl Vilips
- Kevin Yu (13)

2. Recent winners of the Masters Tournament (2019–2024)

- Tiger Woods did not play.

3. Recent winners of The Players Championship (2019–2024)

- Justin Thomas (5,13,15,16)

4. Recent winners of the U.S. Open (2019–2024)

- Wyndham Clark (13,15) (Note: Wyndham Clark withdrew during the second round due to a neck injury. Clark played a total of 27 holes.)
- Matt Fitzpatrick (13)
- Gary Woodland

5. Recent winners of the PGA Championship (2019–2024)

- Collin Morikawa (6,13,15)

6. Recent winners of The Open Championship (2019–2024)

- Brian Harman (13,15)

7. Recent winners of the FedEx Cup (2020–2024)

- Patrick Cantlay (13,15)
- Viktor Hovland (10,13,15)

8. Recent winners of the WGC Match Play (2022–2023)

- Sam Burns (13,15)

9. Recent winners of the Arnold Palmer Invitational (2023–2025)

- Kurt Kitayama (13)

10. Recent winners of the Memorial Tournament (2022–2024)

11. Recent winners of the Genesis Invitational (2023–2025)

12. Olympic gold medalist (2024)

13. Top 125 from the previous season's FedEx Cup points list

- An Byeong-hun (15)
- Daniel Berger
- Christiaan Bezuidenhout
- Jacob Bridgeman
- Eric Cole
- Corey Conners (15)
- Joel Dahmen
- Tony Finau (15)
- Patrick Fishburn
- Tommy Fleetwood (15)
- Rickie Fowler
- Ryan Fox
- Brice Garnett
- Doug Ghim
- Lucas Glover (15)
- Max Greyserman (15)
- Ben Griffin (15)
- Emiliano Grillo
- Adam Hadwin
- Ryo Hisatsune
- Rico Hoey
- Charley Hoffman
- Tom Hoge
- Nicolai Højgaard
- Max Homa
- Beau Hossler
- Mark Hubbard
- Mackenzie Hughes
- Im Sung-jae (15)
- Chan Kim
- Michael Kim
- Kim Si-woo
- Tom Kim (15)
- Chris Kirk
- Jake Knapp
- Ben Kohles
- Matt Kuchar
- Nate Lashley
- Lee Kyoung-hoon
- Min Woo Lee
- David Lipsky
- Luke List
- Justin Lower
- Denny McCarthy (15)
- Mac Meissner
- Keith Mitchell
- Taylor Moore
- Henrik Norlander
- Andrew Novak
- Pan Cheng-tsung
- Matthieu Pavon (15)
- Chandler Phillips
- Séamus Power
- Andrew Putnam
- Chad Ramey
- Patrick Rodgers
- Justin Rose (15)
- Sam Ryder
- Adam Schenk
- Matti Schmid
- Adam Scott (15)
- Greyson Sigg
- Ben Silverman
- David Skinns
- Alex Smalley
- J. J. Spaun
- Jordan Spieth
- Sam Stevens
- Adam Svensson
- Sahith Theegala (15)
- Sami Välimäki
- Erik van Rooyen
- Vince Whaley
- Cameron Young
- Carson Young
- Will Zalatoris
- Lee Hodges, Alex Norén, Brendon Todd, Victor Perez (Note: Victor Perez withdrew before the first round. He was replaced by Ricky Castillo.) and Jason Day (15) (Note: Jason Day withdrew prior to his first round start time due to illness. He was replaced by Danny Walker.) did not play.

14. Top 125 (medical)

15. Top 50 from the Official World Golf Ranking following the Cognizant Classic

- Laurie Canter
- Rasmus Højgaard (18)

16. Top 10 in the current season's FedEx Cup points standings after the Cognizant Classic

17. Kaulig Companies Championship champion from previous year

- Ernie Els did not play.

18. Leading player who earned a PGA Tour card from the 2024 Race to Dubai

19. Leading points winner from the Korn Ferry Tour during the previous year

20. Remaining positions and alternates filled through current year FedEx Cup standings after the Cognizant Classic

- Frankie Capan III
- Bud Cauley
- Will Chandler
- Ryan Gerard
- Will Gordon
- Lanto Griffin
- Max McGreevy
- Trey Mullinax
- Aldrich Potgieter
- Kevin Roy
- Isaiah Salinda
- Hayden Springer
- Jackson Suber
- Jesper Svensson
- Alejandro Tosti
- Kristoffer Ventura
- Camilo Villegas

==== Alternates added after field was finalized ====
- Ricky Castillo
- Danny Walker

==== Ineligible players ====
The following players met criteria, but having been contracted with LIV Golf, were suspended by the PGA Tour and ineligible to compete:

- Bryson DeChambeau (4,15)
- Tyrrell Hatton (15)
- Dustin Johnson (2,7)
- Brooks Koepka (5)
- Phil Mickelson (5)
- Jon Rahm (2,4,11)
- Cameron Smith (3,6)

== Round summaries ==
=== First round ===
Thursday, March 13, 2025
Friday, March 14, 2025

The overnight lead was shared by Lucas Glover, J. J. Spaun and Camilo Villegas, who recorded scores of 66 (6 under par). Chandler Phillips became the first player to record three eagles in one round at The Players Championship.

Play was suspended due to darkness at 7:34 p.m. EDT with 5 players yet to finish their round. Round 1 was completed on Friday morning.

| Place | Player | Score | To par |
|---|---|---|---|
| T1 | (United States) Lucas Glover | 66 | −6 |
| T1 | (United States) J. J. Spaun | 66 | −6 |
| T1 | (Colombia) Camilo Villegas | 66 | −6 |
| T4 | (United States) Akshay Bhatia | 67 | −5 |
| T4 | (United States) Billy Horschel | 67 | −5 |
| T4 | (Australia) Min Woo Lee | 67 | −5 |
| T4 | (Northern Ireland) Rory McIlroy | 67 | −5 |
| T8 | (England) Laurie Canter | 68 | −4 |
| T8 | (United States) Bud Cauley | 68 | −4 |
| T8 | (United States) Rickie Fowler | 68 | −4 |
| T8 | (Argentina) Emiliano Grillo | 68 | −4 |
| T8 | (Germany) Stephan Jäger | 68 | −4 |
| T8 | (United States) Denny McCarthy | 68 | −4 |
| T8 | (United States) Max McGreevy | 68 | −4 |
| T8 | (United States) Trey Mullinax | 68 | −4 |
| T8 | (United States) Chandler Phillips | 68 | −4 |
| T8 | (England) Aaron Rai | 68 | −4 |
| T8 | (United States) Sam Ryder | 68 | −4 |
| T8 | (United States) Alex Smalley | 68 | −4 |

=== Second round ===
Friday, March 14, 2025

2021 winner Justin Thomas tied the TPC at Sawgrass course record of 62 set by Tom Hoge. Wyndham Clark withdrew due to a neck injury after playing the ninth hole.

The cut came at 143 (−1). Notables to miss the cut included Brian Harman, Matt Fitzpatrick, Hideki Matsuyama, Ludvig Åberg, Maverick McNealy, Max Homa, Viktor Hovland, Justin Rose and Adam Scott.

| Place | Player | Score | To par |
|---|---|---|---|
| T1 | (United States) Akshay Bhatia | 67-66=133 | −11 |
| T1 | (Australia) Min Woo Lee | 67-66=133 | −11 |
| 3 | (United States) J. J. Spaun | 66-68=134 | −10 |
| T4 | (Northern Ireland) Rory McIlroy | 67-68=135 | −9 |
| T4 | (United States) Collin Morikawa | 70-65=135 | −9 |
| T4 | (United States) Alex Smalley | 68-67=135 | −9 |
| T7 | (United States) Lucas Glover | 66-70=136 | −8 |
| T7 | (United States) Will Zalatoris | 70-66=136 | −8 |
| T9 | (England) Tommy Fleetwood | 71-66=137 | −7 |
| T9 | (United States) Jake Knapp | 69-68=137 | −7 |

=== Third round ===
Saturday, March 15, 2025

On the fifth hole, Akshay Bhatia and Min Woo Lee found themselves in the bushes and decided to take a penalty stroke and drop their ball in the back of the driving range across a small lake.

| Place | Player | Score | To par |
|---|---|---|---|
| 1 | (United States) J. J. Spaun | 66-68-70=204 | −12 |
| 2 | (United States) Bud Cauley | 68-71-66=205 | −11 |
| T3 | (United States) Lucas Glover | 66-70-71=207 | −9 |
| T3 | (United States) Alex Smalley | 68-67-72=207 | −9 |
| T5 | (United States) Akshay Bhatia | 67-66-75=208 | −8 |
| T5 | (Canada) Corey Conners | 71-71-66=208 | −8 |
| T5 | (Northern Ireland) Rory McIlroy | 67-68-73=208 | −8 |
| T8 | (United States) Patrick Cantlay | 69-70-70=209 | −7 |
| T8 | (Germany) Stephan Jäger | 68-71-70=209 | −7 |
| T8 | (United States) Jake Knapp | 69-68-72=209 | −7 |
| T8 | (United States) Max McGreevy | 68-71-70=209 | −7 |
| T8 | (Austria) Sepp Straka | 70-68-71=209 | −7 |
| T8 | (United States) Danny Walker | 73-70-66=209 | −7 |

=== Final round ===
Sunday, March 16, 2025

Before play was scheduled to begin Sunday morning, tee times were moved up three hours and players were grouped in threes due to impending storms. Play was suspended at 1:15 p.m. EDT due to an expected line of thunderstorms. At the time of the weather delay, Rory McIlroy held the sole lead, with J. J. Spaun in second and Tom Hoge, Akshay Bhatia and Danny Walker tied for third. Play resumed at 5:15 p.m. EDT.

McIlroy began the final round four shots off the lead but moved within one after making eagle on the par-5 second hole. He moved into sole possession of the lead with another birdie on the 11th before play was suspended.

Overnight leader Spaun made two bogeys on the front nine and did not make a birdie until the ninth hole as he fell from atop the leaderboard. Once play resumed, he hit into a bunker on the par-5 11th and made another bogey to fall three shots back of McIlroy. He then hit his approach on the 14th hole to within a foot and tapped in for birdie. He got up-and-down on the par-5 16th for another birdie and moved back into a tie with McIlroy, who made bogey on the 14th after driving into the trees and being forced to chip out into the fairway. McIlroy parred his last four holes to finish at 12-under, while Spaun had a 30-foot putt for birdie on the 18th green to win the championship but came up just short, forcing a Monday three-hole playoff.

Akshay Bhatia birdied three of his first four holes and was tied for the lead until two bogeys on the eighth and tenth holes. He parred his last eight holes to finish at 10-under, two shots out of the playoff. Tom Hoge made four birdies on his front-nine and shot a six-under 66 to tie Bhatia for third place, along with Lucas Glover. Bud Cauley, who began the round a shot behind Spaun, was three-over through his first eight holes and ended up with a two-over 74 to fall back to sixth place.

(c) = past champion

| Place | Player | Score | To par | Money ($) |
|---|---|---|---|---|
| T1 | (Northern Ireland) Rory McIlroy (c) | 67-68-73-68=276 | −12 | Playoff |
| T1 | (United States) J. J. Spaun | 66-68-70-72=276 | −12 | Playoff |
| T3 | (United States) Akshay Bhatia | 67-66-75-70=278 | −10 | 1,325,000 |
| T3 | (United States) Lucas Glover | 66-70-71-71=278 | −10 | 1,325,000 |
| T3 | (United States) Tom Hoge | 71-70-71-66=278 | −10 | 1,325,000 |
| T6 | (United States) Bud Cauley | 68-71-66-74=279 | −9 | 843,750 |
| T6 | (Canada) Corey Conners | 71-71-66-71=279 | −9 | 843,750 |
| T6 | (United States) Danny Walker | 73-70-66-70=279 | −9 | 843,750 |
| 9 | (Scotland) Robert MacIntyre | 69-70-72-69=280 | −8 | 731,250 |
| T10 | (United States) Collin Morikawa | 70-65-77-69=281 | −7 | 656,250 |
| T10 | (United States) Davis Thompson | 72-68-71-70=281 | −7 | 656,250 |

Leaderboard below the top 10
| Place | Player | Score | To par | Money ($) |
|---|---|---|---|---|
| T12 | (United States) Patrick Cantlay | 69-70-70-73=282 | −6 | 556,250 |
| T12 | (United States) Jake Knapp | 69-68-72-73=282 | −6 | 556,250 |
| T14 | (England) Tommy Fleetwood | 71-66-75-71=283 | −5 | 418,750 |
| T14 | (United States) Denny McCarthy | 68-74-70-71=283 | −5 | 418,750 |
| T14 | (England) Aaron Rai | 68-74-72-69=283 | −5 | 418,750 |
| T14 | (United States) Sam Ryder | 68-71-72-72=283 | −5 | 418,750 |
| T14 | (United States) Alex Smalley | 68-67-72-76=283 | −5 | 418,750 |
| T14 | (Austria) Sepp Straka | 70-68-71-74=283 | −5 | 418,750 |
| T20 | (United States) Daniel Berger | 70-73-69-72=284 | −4 | 240,250 |
| T20 | (United States) Keegan Bradley | 70-72-72-70=284 | −4 | 240,250 |
| T20 | (New Zealand) Ryan Fox | 72-70-72-70=284 | −4 | 240,250 |
| T20 | (United States) Joe Highsmith | 69-72-73-70=284 | −4 | 240,250 |
| T20 | (Germany) Stephan Jäger | 68-71-70-75=284 | −4 | 240,250 |
| T20 | (Australia) Min Woo Lee | 67-66-78-73=284 | −4 | 240,250 |
| T20 | (Republic of Ireland) Shane Lowry | 72-71-74-67=284 | −4 | 240,250 |
| T20 | (United States) Matt McCarty | 70-69-75-70=284 | −4 | 240,250 |
| T20 | (United States) Max McGreevy | 68-71-70-75=284 | −4 | 240,250 |
| T20 | (United States) Scottie Scheffler (c) | 69-70-72-73=284 | −4 | 240,250 |
| T30 | (United States) Harris English | 72-66-76-71=285 | −3 | 163,750 |
| T30 | (United States) Russell Henley | 72-70-74-69=285 | −3 | 163,750 |
| T30 | (United States) Will Zalatoris | 70-66-78-71=285 | −3 | 163,750 |
| T33 | (Philippines) Rico Hoey | 73-69-78-66=286 | −2 | 136,250 |
| T33 | (United States) Kurt Kitayama | 72-70-78-66=286 | −2 | 136,250 |
| T33 | (United States) Taylor Moore | 71-68-73-74=286 | −2 | 136,250 |
| T33 | (United States) J. T. Poston | 73-68-69-76=286 | −2 | 136,250 |
| T33 | (United States) Justin Thomas (c) | 78-62-73-73=286 | −2 | 136,250 |
| T38 | (South Korea) Kim Si-woo | 71-70-78-68=287 | −1 | 111,250 |
| T38 | (United States) Justin Lower | 72-71-71-73=287 | −1 | 111,250 |
| T38 | (Canada) Taylor Pendrith | 69-70-73-75=287 | −1 | 111,250 |
| T38 | (United States) Davis Riley | 74-66-73-74=287 | −1 | 111,250 |
| T42 | (United States) Ryan Gerard | 72-69-69-78=288 | E | 81,688 |
| T42 | (United States) Billy Horschel | 67-71-77-73=288 | E | 81,688 |
| T42 | (South Korea) Tom Kim | 70-73-69-76=288 | E | 81,688 |
| T42 | (United States) Chris Kirk | 70-71-70-77=288 | E | 81,688 |
| T42 | (United States) Matt Kuchar (c) | 71-71-73-73=288 | E | 81,688 |
| T42 | (United States) Mac Meissner | 74-69-70-75=288 | E | 81,688 |
| T42 | (United States) Hayden Springer | 72-69-75-72=288 | E | 81,688 |
| T42 | (Sweden) Jesper Svensson | 72-70-72-74=288 | E | 81,688 |
| T50 | (United States) Jacob Bridgeman | 69-69-76-75=289 | +1 | 63,500 |
| T50 | (United States) Beau Hossler | 70-69-77-73=289 | +1 | 63,500 |
| T52 | (South Korea) An Byeong-hun | 73-69-76-72=290 | +2 | 60,750 |
| T52 | (United States) Sahith Theegala | 73-67-77-73=290 | +2 | 60,750 |
| T54 | (United States) Joel Dahmen | 76-66-74-75=291 | +3 | 58,250 |
| T54 | (United States) Charley Hoffman | 74-65-79-73=291 | +3 | 58,250 |
| T54 | (France) Matthieu Pavon | 70-72-76-73=291 | +3 | 58,250 |
| T54 | (Colombia) Camilo Villegas | 66-76-75-74=291 | +3 | 58,250 |
| T54 | (United States) Carson Young | 73-67-78-73=291 | +3 | 58,250 |
| 59 | (United States) Jordan Spieth | 70-71-73-78=292 | +4 | 56,750 |
| 60 | (Venezuela) Jhonattan Vegas | 73-68-79-73=293 | +5 | 56,250 |
| T61 | (United States) Will Chandler | 71-70-76-77=294 | +6 | 54,500 |
| T61 | (United States) Austin Eckroat | 69-73-74-78=294 | +6 | 54,500 |
| T61 | (South Korea) Im Sung-jae | 76-66-76-76=294 | +6 | 54,500 |
| T61 | (United States) Trey Mullinax | 68-73-80-73=294 | +6 | 54,500 |
| T61 | (United States) Chandler Phillips | 68-73-76-77=294 | +6 | 54,500 |
| T61 | (United States) Cameron Young | 70-70-81-73=294 | +6 | 54,500 |
| 67 | (Argentina) Emiliano Grillo | 68-70-85-72=295 | +7 | 52,750 |
| 68 | (United States) Isaiah Salinda | 69-71-78-78=296 | +8 | 52,250 |
| T69 | (Taiwan) Pan Cheng-tsung | 71-72-77-77=297 | +9 | 51,500 |
| T69 | (Finland) Sami Välimäki | 70-71-82-74=297 | +9 | 51,500 |
| 71 | (United States) Rickie Fowler (c) | 68-71-82-79=300 | +12 | 50,750 |
| 72 | (United States) Xander Schauffele | 72-71-77-81=301 | +13 | 50,250 |
| CUT | (England) Laurie Canter | 68-76=144 | E | |
| CUT | (United States) Ricky Castillo | 70-74=144 | E | |
| CUT | (United States) Michael Kim | 75-69=144 | E | |
| CUT | (United States) Ben Kohles | 69-75=144 | E | |
| CUT | (United States) David Lipsky | 76-68=144 | E | |
| CUT | (United States) Peter Malnati | 72-72=144 | E | |
| CUT | (Japan) Hideki Matsuyama | 74-70=144 | E | |
| CUT | (Sweden) Henrik Norlander | 73-71=144 | E | |
| CUT | (England) Justin Rose | 71-73=144 | E | |
| CUT | (United States) Sam Burns | 73-72=145 | +1 | |
| CUT | (United States) Brian Campbell | 74-71=145 | +1 | |
| CUT | (United States) Patrick Fishburn | 77-68=145 | +1 | |
| CUT | (United States) Ben Griffin | 71-74=145 | +1 | |
| CUT | (England) Harry Hall | 75-70=145 | +1 | |
| CUT | (Canada) Mackenzie Hughes | 73-72=145 | +1 | |
| CUT | (United States) Nate Lashley | 74-71=145 | +1 | |
| CUT | (United States) Keith Mitchell | 72-73=145 | +1 | |
| CUT | (South Africa) Aldrich Potgieter | 74-71=145 | +1 | |
| CUT | (United States) Adam Schenk | 72-73=145 | +1 | |
| CUT | (England) David Skinns | 71-74=145 | +1 | |
| CUT | (Argentina) Alejandro Tosti | 70-75=145 | +1 | |
| CUT | (South Africa) Erik van Rooyen | 72-73=145 | +1 | |
| CUT | (United States) Vince Whaley | 73-72=145 | +1 | |
| CUT | (Sweden) Ludvig Åberg | 71-75=146 | +2 | |
| CUT | (United States) Chris Gotterup | 73-73=146 | +2 | |
| CUT | (Canada) Adam Hadwin | 69-77=146 | +2 | |
| CUT | (Japan) Ryo Hisatsune | 72-74=146 | +2 | |
| CUT | (Denmark) Nicolai Højgaard | 73-73=146 | +2 | |
| CUT | (United States) Chan Kim | 71-75=146 | +2 | |
| CUT | (United States) Patton Kizzire | 73-73=146 | +2 | |
| CUT | (Germany) Matti Schmid | 78-68=146 | +2 | |
| CUT | (Australia) Adam Scott (c) | 74-72=146 | +2 | |
| CUT | (United States) Sam Stevens | 74-72=146 | +2 | |
| CUT | (Canada) Nick Taylor | 74-72=146 | +2 | |
| CUT | (South Africa) Christiaan Bezuidenhout | 71-76=147 | +3 | |
| CUT | (Belgium) Thomas Detry | 79-68=147 | +3 | |
| CUT | (Colombia) Nico Echavarría | 70-77=147 | +3 | |
| CUT | (United States) Andrew Novak | 77-70=147 | +3 | |
| CUT | (Republic of Ireland) Séamus Power | 76-71=147 | +3 | |
| CUT | (United States) Chad Ramey | 77-70=147 | +3 | |
| CUT | (United States) Kevin Roy | 77-70=147 | +3 | |
| CUT | (United States) Greyson Sigg | 73-74=147 | +3 | |
| CUT | (United States) Jackson Suber | 77-70=147 | +3 | |
| CUT | (United States) Eric Cole | 77-71=148 | +4 | |
| CUT | (United States) Brice Garnett | 72-76=148 | +4 | |
| CUT | (United States) Doug Ghim | 72-76=148 | +4 | |
| CUT | (Norway) Viktor Hovland | 80-68=148 | +4 | |
| CUT | (South Korea) Lee Kyoung-hoon | 77-71=148 | +4 | |
| CUT | (United States) Andrew Putnam | 75-73=148 | +4 | |
| CUT | (United States) Patrick Rodgers | 76-72=148 | +4 | |
| CUT | (Taiwan) Kevin Yu | 74-74=148 | +4 | |
| CUT | (United States) Luke List | 77-72=149 | +5 | |
| CUT | (England) Matt Fitzpatrick | 78-72=150 | +6 | |
| CUT | (United States) Lanto Griffin | 77-73=150 | +6 | |
| CUT | (United States) Brian Harman | 73-77=150 | +6 | |
| CUT | (United States) Max Homa | 79-71=150 | +6 | |
| CUT | (Norway) Kristoffer Ventura | 77-73=150 | +6 | |
| CUT | (Australia) Karl Vilips | 72-78=150 | +6 | |
| CUT | (United States) Will Gordon | 76-75=151 | +7 | |
| CUT | (Canada) Adam Svensson | 75-76=151 | +7 | |
| CUT | (United States) Tony Finau | 76-76=152 | +8 | |
| CUT | (United States) Max Greyserman | 74-78=152 | +8 | |
| CUT | (Denmark) Rasmus Højgaard | 72-80=152 | +8 | |
| CUT | (United States) Mark Hubbard | 79-73=152 | +8 | |
| CUT | (Canada) Ben Silverman | 78-74=152 | +8 | |
| CUT | (United States) Frankie Capan III | 75-78=153 | +9 | |
| CUT | (United States) Maverick McNealy | 72-81=153 | +9 | |
| CUT | (United States) Nick Dunlap | 80-74=154 | +10 | |
| CUT | (Puerto Rico) Rafael Campos | 79-77=156 | +12 | |
| CUT | (Australia) Cameron Davis | 76-80=156 | +12 | |
| CUT | (United States) Gary Woodland | 78-78=156 | +12 | |
| WD | (United States) Wyndham Clark | 72 | E | |

==== Scorecard ====
| Hole | 1 | 2 | 3 | 4 | 5 | 6 | 7 | 8 | 9 | 10 | 11 | 12 | 13 | 14 | 15 | 16 | 17 | 18 |
|---|---|---|---|---|---|---|---|---|---|---|---|---|---|---|---|---|---|---|
| Par | 4 | 5 | 3 | 4 | 4 | 4 | 4 | 3 | 5 | 4 | 5 | 4 | 3 | 4 | 4 | 5 | 3 | 4 |
| (Northern Ireland) McIlroy | −9 | −11 | −11 | −11 | −11 | −11 | −10 | −11 | −11 | −11 | −12 | −13 | −13 | −12 | −12 | −12 | −12 | −12 |
| (United States) Spaun | −12 | −12 | −12 | −12 | −11 | −11 | −11 | −10 | −11 | −11 | −10 | −10 | −10 | −11 | −11 | −12 | −12 | −12 |
| (United States) Bhatia | −9 | −10 | −10 | −11 | −11 | −11 | −11 | −10 | −11 | −10 | −10 | −10 | −10 | −10 | −10 | −10 | −10 | −10 |
| (United States) Glover | −9 | −8 | −8 | −8 | −7 | −7 | −7 | −6 | −6 | −7 | −7 | −7 | −8 | −9 | −9 | −10 | −10 | −10 |
| (United States) Hoge | −4 | −5 | −5 | −5 | −6 | −6 | −7 | −7 | −8 | −9 | −8 | −8 | −9 | −9 | −9 | −10 | −10 | −10 |
| (United States) Cauley | −11 | −11 | −10 | −9 | −9 | −9 | −9 | −8 | −9 | −9 | −8 | −9 | −8 | −8 | −8 | −8 | −9 | −9 |
| (Canada) Conners | −8 | −8 | −8 | −7 | −7 | −7 | −7 | −7 | −7 | −7 | −8 | −8 | −9 | −8 | −8 | −9 | −9 | −9 |
| (United States) Walker | −7 | −8 | −8 | −7 | −8 | −8 | −8 | −8 | −8 | −9 | −10 | −10 | −9 | −9 | −9 | −9 | −9 | −9 |

Cumulative tournament scores, relative to par

| Eagle | Birdie | Bogey |

===== Playoff =====
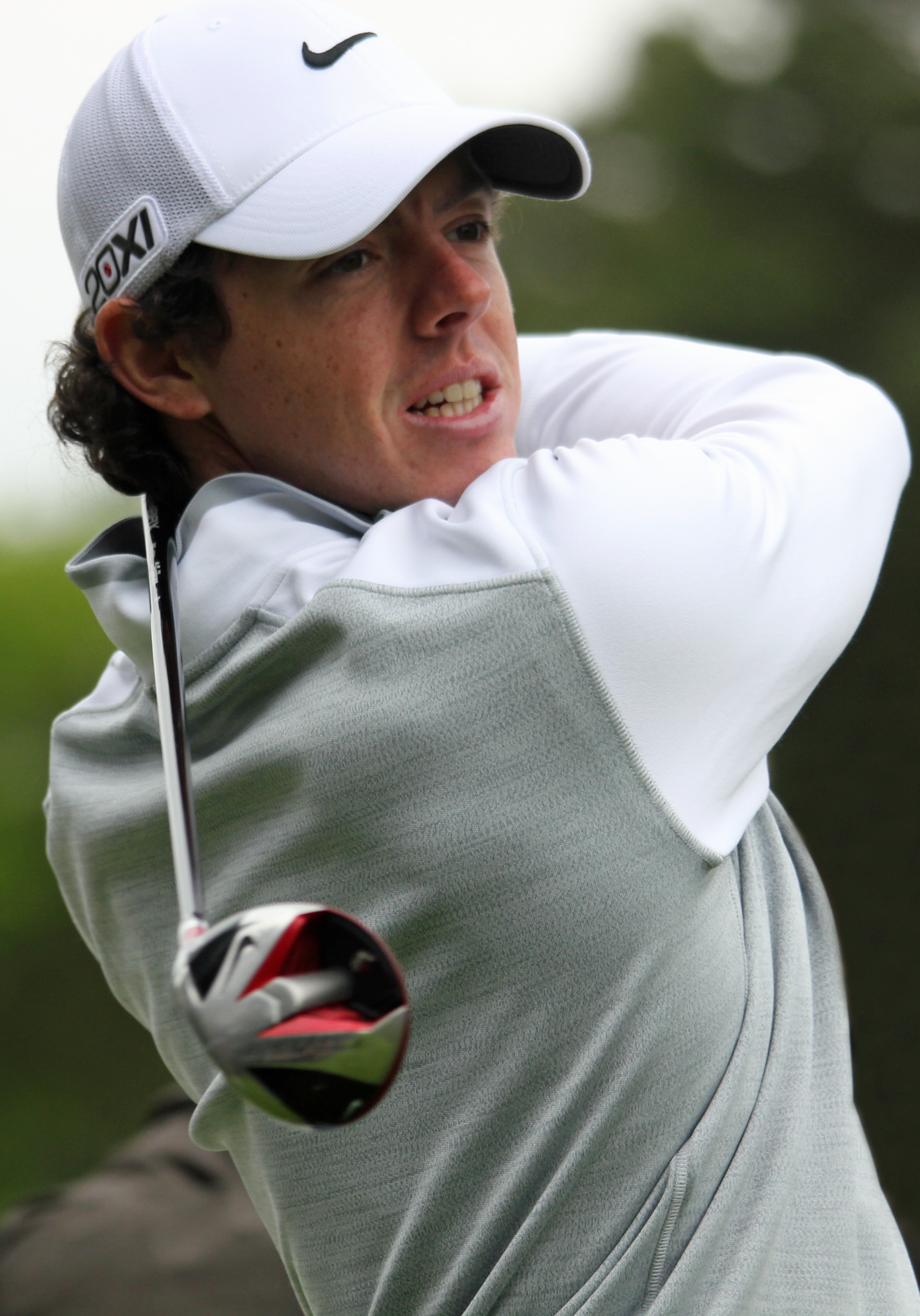
Rory McIlroy was the 2025 Players Championship winner.

The three-hole aggregate playoff began on the par-5 16th hole. McIlroy found the green on his second shot and two-putted from 33 feet for birdie, while Spaun couldn't get up-and-down from a greenside bunker and settled for par.

On the par-3 17th, Spaun hit his tee shot over the island green into the water hazard and ended up with a triple bogey, while McIlroy three-putted for bogey and took a three-shot lead into the final hole. Both players had to chip out into the fairway after hitting their tee shots into the trees on the right. McIlroy then hit his third shot to 17 feet and two-putted for a bogey to secure his second Players Championship title. This was the first playoff since 2015.

Champion
(c) = past champion

| Place | Player | Score | To par | Money ($) |
|---|---|---|---|---|
| 1 | (Northern Ireland) Rory McIlroy (c) | 4-4-5=13 | +1 | 4,500,000 |
| 2 | (United States) J. J. Spaun | 5-6-x=x | x | 2,725,000 |

===== Scorecard =====
| Hole | 16 | 17 | 18 |
|---|---|---|---|
| Par | 5 | 3 | 4 |
| (Northern Ireland) McIlroy | −1 | E | +1 |
| (United States) Spaun | E | +3 | x |
