= J. J. Spaun =

American professional golfer (born 1990)

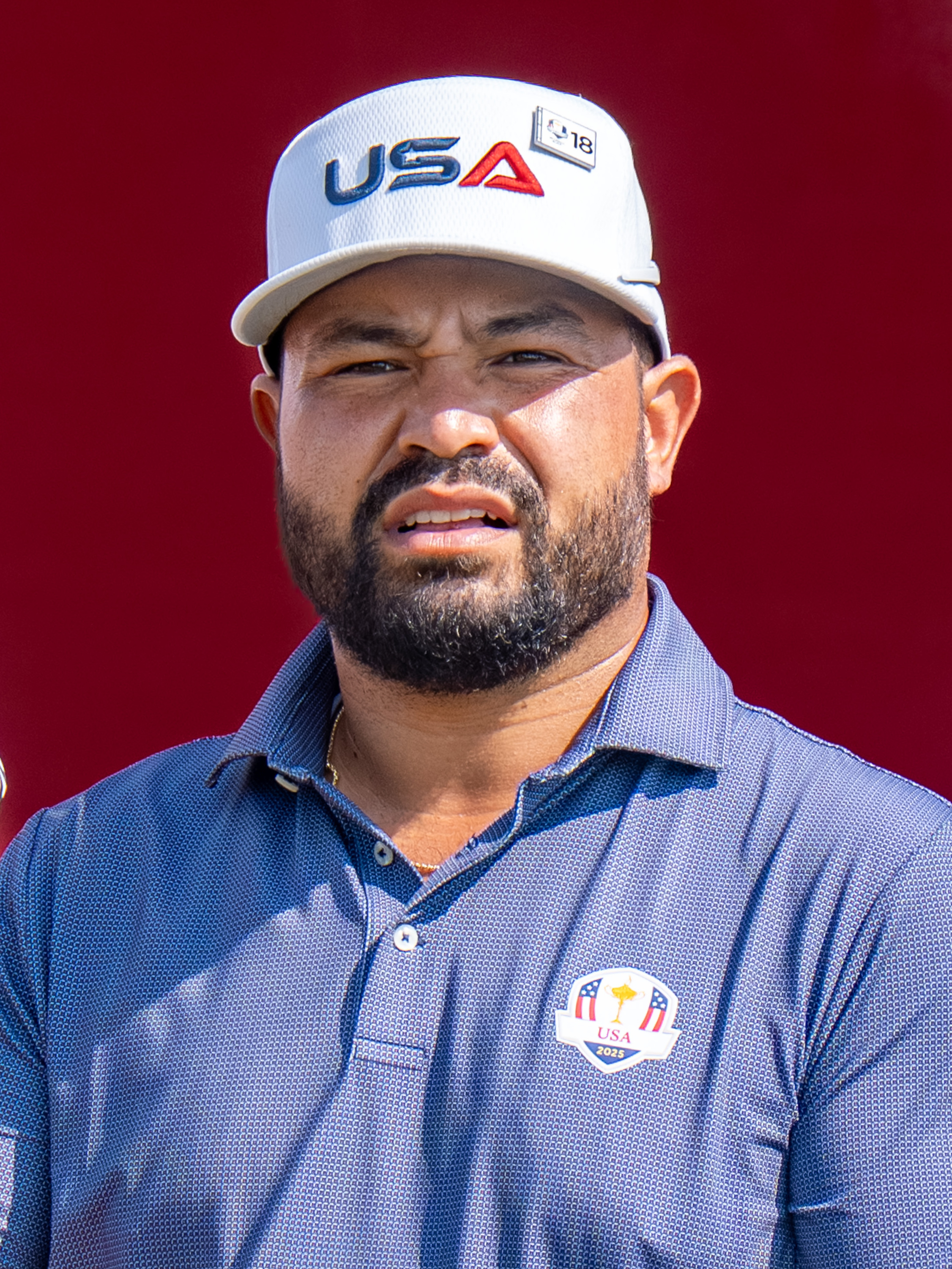
- Spaun at the 2025 Ryder Cup

Personal information
- Full name: John Michael Spaun Jr.
- Nationality: United States
- Born: August 21, 1990 (age 36) Los Angeles, California, U.S.
- Height: 5 ft 8 in (1.73 m)
- Weight: 185 lb (84 kg; 13.2 st)
- Spouse: Melody Means (m. 2019)
- Children: 2

Career
- Sport: Golf
- College: San Diego State University
- Turned professional: 2012
- Current tour: PGA Tour
- Former tours: Korn Ferry Tour; PGA Tour Canada; Gateway Tour
- Professional wins: 8
- Highest ranking: 5 (April 5, 2026) (as of November 15, 2026)

Number of wins by tour
- PGA Tour: 3
- European Tour: 2
- Japan Golf Tour: 1
- Korn Ferry Tour: 1
- Other: 2

Best results in major championships (wins: 1)
- Masters Tournament: T23: 2022
- PGA Championship: T35: 2018
- U.S. Open: Won: 2025
- The Open Championship: T23: 2025

Achievements and awards
- PGA Tour Canada Order of Merit winner: 2015

John Michael "J. J." Spaun Jr. (born August 21, 1990) is an American professional golfer who plays on the PGA Tour. He has won one major championship, the 2025 U.S. Open.

After playing for the San Diego State Aztecs, Spaun turned professional in 2012. He earned a PGA Tour card in 2016, and won his first PGA Tour event in 2022. Spaun had a breakthrough year in 2025: he finished runner-up at the Players Championship in March and won the U.S. Open in June.

== Early life and amateur career ==
Spaun was born in Los Angeles, California, on August 21, 1990. His father, John Michael Spaun Sr., is an American of European descent, and his mother, Dollie (née Rigor), is of Filipino and Mexican descent. His mother's paternal grandparents moved to California from Victoria in the Philippines, and spoke Iloco. As of 2022, John Sr. was a hospital administrator, and Dollie was an office manager.

Spaun's mother was an avid golfer and received a doctor's permission to continue playing golf while carrying him until she was eight months pregnant. Spaun received a plastic set of golf clubs when he was three years old, and practiced from a young age by hitting balls into a net his father had set up in their garage. He did not receive formal lessons while growing up.

Spaun attended San Dimas High School, where he played for the golf team and was a CIF Southern Section finalist in 2007 and 2008. After graduating in 2008, Spaun enrolled at San Diego State University (SDSU). He was lightly recruited out of high school, and chose to walk on as a collegiate golfer for the San Diego State Aztecs. He had four top-10 finishes and a 72.59 stroke average during his freshman season in 2008–09.

In April 2010, Spaun won his first individual collegiate title at the Thunderbird Invitational. He averaged 72.34 for his sophomore season, which was second-best on the team behind Johan Carlsson. Spaun was named an All-Mountain West Conference (MW) selection for 2010. In his junior season, Spaun defended his title at the Thunderbird Invitational in April 2011, becoming the first player since Phil Mickelson to win back-to-back titles at the event. Spaun also finished tied for third in the stroke play at the 2011 NCAA Division I men's golf championship. He was named an All-MW selection for a second year in a row as well as a third-team All-American, recording seven top-10 finishes and a team-low 71.62 stroke average.

During his senior season, Spaun won three individual titles and posted a 70.82 scoring average. At the 2012 NCAA Division I men's golf championship, he helped the Aztecs advance to the match play for the first time in SDSU history. Spaun defeated Max Homa of the California Golden Bears, 4 and 3, in the first round, but the Aztecs lost to the Bears 3–2 and were eliminated. For his performances, Spaun was named MW Player of the Year and a second-team All-American. A social science major at SDSU, Spaun turned professional following his graduation in 2012. His total of five individual collegiate wins tied the Aztecs record set by Lennie Clements.

== Professional career ==
=== 2013–2016: Development tours ===
Spaun won his first professional tournament in 2013, at a Gateway Tour event in Arizona. He was tied for the lead with Jimmy Gunn entering the final round, and ultimately won by one stroke. Spaun used the $10,000 prize money to cover his expenses during the PGA Tour Canada schedule that summer. Spaun finished 38th in the 2013 PGA Tour Canada Order of Merit, which was enough to retain his playing status for the next season. After missing six of seven cuts and earning only $825 during the 2014 season, he lost his playing privileges and went to qualifying school, where he finished tied-8th and regained his card for the 2015 PGA Tour Canada season.

In July 2015, Spaun won the Staal Foundation Open. This moved him inside the top three on the PGA Tour Canada (renamed Mackenzie Tour) Order of Merit, earning entry into the 2015 RBC Canadian Open. The Canadian Open was Spaun's PGA Tour debut, where he finished T41.

With two events remaining in the 2015 season, Spaun broke the record in PGA Tour Canada single-season earnings. He made the cut in all of the eleven events he played, which included a tour-record four consecutive top-five finishes and six consecutive top-10s. Spaun finished as the PGA Tour Canada Order of Merit winner, which made him fully exempt on the Web.com Tour for 2016. Spaun also played in the PGA Tour's Northern Trust Open in February 2016 at Riviera Country Club through a sponsor exemption reserved for golfers of a minority background, where he missed the cut. Later that year, Spaun won his first event on the Web.com Tour, at the News Sentinel Open. He shot a tournament record 26-under 258 to beat Sam Ryder by one stroke. The win came on August 21, 2016, his 26th birthday, and ensured his promotion to the PGA Tour the following year.

=== 2017–2024: Early PGA Tour seasons ===
Spaun recorded three top-10 finishes during his rookie season on the 2016–17 PGA Tour, placing 97th in the FedEx Cup rankings. He had four top-10s, including a runner-up finish at the RSM Classic, during the 2017–18 season, and placed 62nd in the FedEx Cup. In the 2018–19 season, he placed 99th in the FedEx Cup rankings, with two top-10 finishes during the year.

In the 2019–20 season, Spaun finished 185th in the FedEx Cup rankings, with no top-25 finishes during the year. This would usually have caused a player to lose his PGA Tour card, but the tour relaxed its policies due to the season being shortened by the COVID-19 pandemic. He stated, "I was just playing bad, like I was lost. I didn't know where my swing was, I didn't know what to do."

Spaun officially lost his PGA Tour card during the 2020–21 season, where he finished 174th in the FedEx Cup rankings and dropped outside the top 500 of the Official World Golf Ranking. He immediately regained his playing privileges through the Korn Ferry Tour Finals by placing second at the Albertsons Boise Open in August 2021.

After 147 PGA Tour starts, Spaun earned his first PGA Tour win at the Valero Texas Open in April 2022. He won by two strokes over Matt Jones and Matt Kuchar. The win qualified him for the 2022 Masters Tournament the following week. Making his Masters debut, he finished tied-23rd.

Spaun had a poor start to the 2024 PGA Tour season, and in June was outside the top 180 of the FedEx Cup rankings. He recorded three top-10 finishes in the second half of the year, which was enough to maintain his playing privileges for the 2025 season. During the early-season struggles, Spaun considered the possibility of ending his career if he failed to keep his PGA Tour card.

=== 2025: Breakthrough season, U.S. Open victory ===
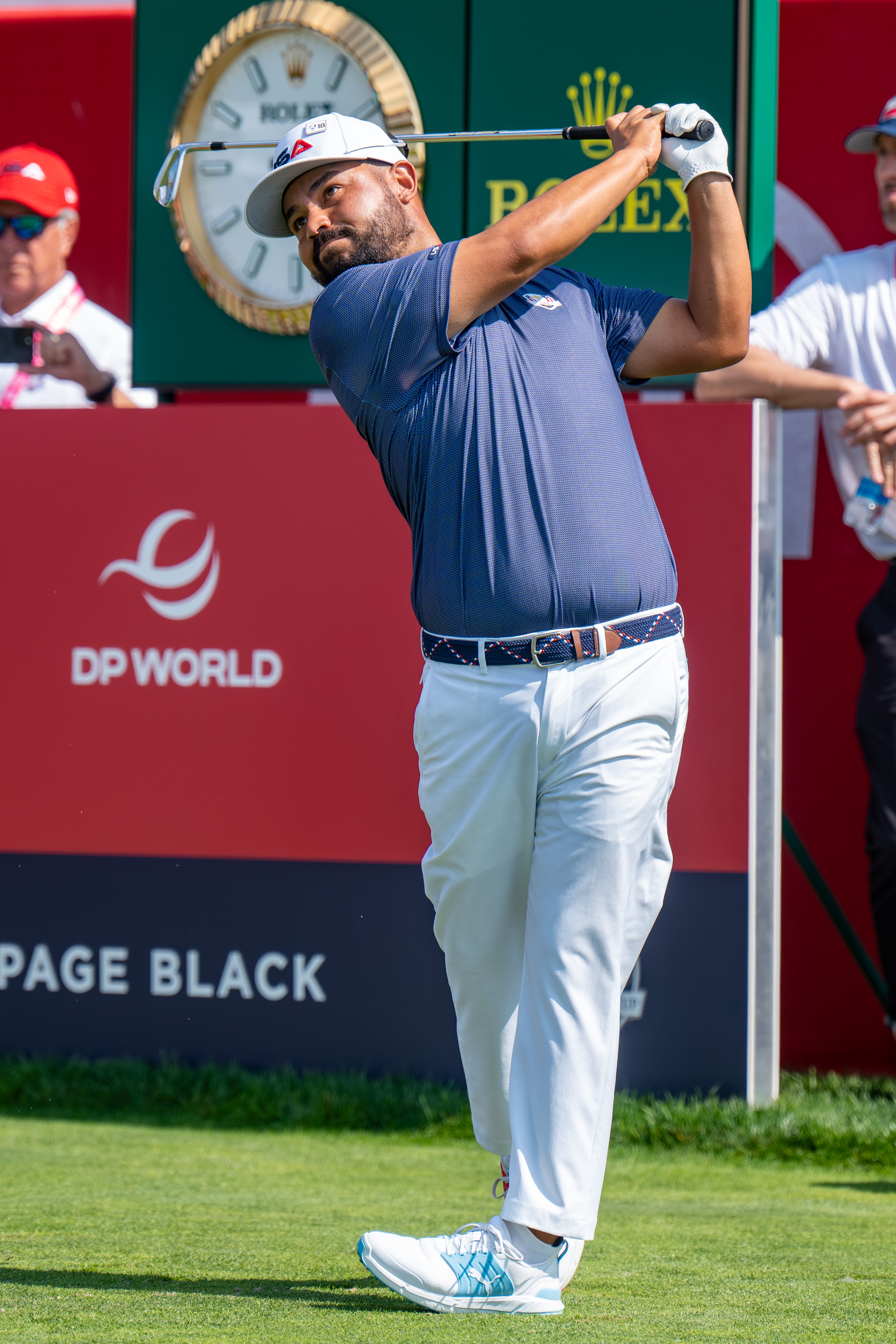
Spaun at the 2025 Ryder Cup

In his first start of 2025, Spaun held the 54-hole lead at the Sony Open in Hawaii, but finished tied-third, one shot outside a playoff between Nico Echavarría and Nick Taylor. At the beginning of March, Spaun placed joint-second at the Cognizant Classic after shooting a final-round 66.

At the 2025 Players Championship in March, Spaun had a one-stroke lead after 54 holes. He shot an even-par 72 in the final round to tie the score of 12-under set by 2019 champion Rory McIlroy and entered a three-hole aggregate playoff, which was held the following day. In the playoff, Spaun hit his tee shot at the par-3 island-green 17th hole into the water and made triple bogey. McIlroy won with an aggregate score of +1. The runner-up finish moved Spaun to a new career-high 25th in the Official World Golf Ranking.

In June, at the 2025 U.S. Open held at Oakmont Country Club, Spaun opened with a bogey-free 66 to take the first-round lead. He fell out of first place the next day and trailed leader Sam Burns by one shot after 54 holes. Spaun bogeyed five of his first six holes as part of a front-nine 40 in the final round to fall five shots behind Burns. After a weather delay, Spaun regrouped and made birdies on the 12th, 14th, and 17th holes to establish a one-shot lead headed to the 18th hole. Needing a two-putt to secure the title, he drained a 64-foot (20 m) putt for birdie on the final hole, making him the only golfer to finish under par for the tournament at 1-under 279. This earned Spaun his first win at a major championship, by two strokes ahead of Robert MacIntyre. Prior to this victory, Spaun's best finish in a major was 23rd place, and he had missed the cut in his only previous start at the U.S. Open (2021). With the win, Spaun vaulted to eighth in the Official World Golf Ranking, and earned $4.3 million, his largest payday.

In August, Spaun recorded his third runner-up finish of the year at the FedEx St. Jude Championship. He was defeated on the third hole of a sudden-death playoff by Justin Rose. This result meant that Spaun automatically qualified for the 2025 Ryder Cup.

=== 2026–present ===
In April 2026, Spaun won the Valero Texas Open for the second time in his career. He shot 17-under 271 to finish one stroke ahead of Michael Kim, Robert MacIntyre and Matt Wallace. It was his first victory since the 2025 U.S. Open. Prior to his win, Spaun had not finished inside the top 20 in any of his seven starts in 2026.

In September 2026, Spaun won BMW PGA Championship at Wenworth Club, marking his first DP World Tour victory by making birdies on 4 of his last 5 holes to post −17 while Manuel Elvira double bogeyed the par-5 18th hole to fall back to −15.

== Personal life ==
When he was five years old, Spaun was hit by a car while skateboarding, but suffered only minor injuries. He later told his father he wanted to be a professional skateboarder, to which his father replied: "No." Spaun also began playing the guitar as a child, and stated in 2018 that he can play "Stairway to Heaven" by Led Zeppelin.

Spaun was diagnosed with type 2 diabetes in 2018 after a prolonged period of feeling run down, but the treatment he received was ineffective. He found out in 2021 that he had been misdiagnosed and instead had type 1 diabetes.

In 2019, Spaun married Melody Means. Their first daughter Emerson was born in 2020, followed by a second daughter Violet in 2023. While he lived in San Dimas, California, Spaun was a five-year season-pass holder at Disneyland. In 2016, he moved to Scottsdale, Arizona, where he continues to live as of 2025.

== Professional wins (8) ==
=== PGA Tour wins (3) ===
Legend
Major championships (1)
Other PGA Tour (2)

No.	Date	Tournament	Winning score	Margin of victory	Runner(s)-up
1	Apr 3, 2022	Valero Texas Open	−13 (67-70-69-69=275)	2 strokes	(Australia) Matt Jones, (United States) Matt Kuchar
2	Jun 15, 2025	U.S. Open	−1 (66-72-69-72=279)	2 strokes	(Scotland) Robert MacIntyre
3	Apr 5, 2026	Valero Texas Open (2)	−17 (69-69-66-67=271)	1 stroke	(United States) Michael Kim, (Scotland) Robert MacIntyre, (England) Matt Wallace

PGA Tour playoff record (0–2)

No.	Year	Tournament	Opponent	Result
1	2025	The Players Championship	(Northern Ireland) Rory McIlroy	Lost three-hole aggregate playoff; McIlroy: +1 (4-4-5=13), Spaun: x (5-6-x=x)
2	2025	FedEx St. Jude Championship	(England) Justin Rose	Lost to birdie on third extra hole

=== European Tour wins (2) ===
Legend
Major championships (1)
Rolex Series (1)
Other European Tour (0)

No.	Date	Tournament	Winning score	Margin of victory	Runner(s)-up
1	Jun 15, 2025	U.S. Open	−1 (66-72-69-72=279)	2 strokes	(Scotland) Robert MacIntyre
2	Sep 20, 2026	BMW PGA Championship	−17 (70-66-68-67=271)	2 strokes	(Spain) Manuel Elvira, (Northern Ireland) Rory McIlroy, (England) Aaron Rai, (Australia) Adam Scott

=== Japan Golf Tour wins (1) ===
No.	Date	Tournament	Winning score	Margin of victory	Runners-up
1	Nov 22, 2026	Dunlop Phoenix Tournament	−16 (66-70-62-66=264)	8 strokes	(Japan) Yusaku Hosono, (Japan) Ryo Katsumata

=== Web.com Tour wins (1) ===
No.	Date	Tournament	Winning score	Margin of victory	Runner-up
1	Aug 21, 2016	News Sentinel Open	−26 (66-62-64-66=258)	1 stroke	(United States) Sam Ryder

Web.com Tour playoff record (0–1)

No.	Year	Tournament	Opponents	Result
1	2016	Air Capital Classic	(United States) Collin Morikawa (a), (United States) Ollie Schniederjans	Schniederjans won with birdie on second extra hole

=== PGA Tour Canada wins (1) ===
No.	Date	Tournament	Winning score	Margin of victory	Runner-up
1	Jul 19, 2015	Staal Foundation Open	−18 (67-67-69-67=270)	1 stroke	(United States) Nicholas Reach

=== Gateway Tour wins (1) ===
- 2013 National Series 7

== Major championships ==
=== Wins (1) ===
Year	Championship	54 holes	Winning score	Margin	Runner-up
2025	U.S. Open	1 shot deficit	−1 (66-72-69-72=279)	2 strokes	(Scotland) Robert MacIntyre

=== Results timeline ===
Results not in chronological order before 2019 and in 2020.

Tournament	2018	2019	2020	2021	2022	2023	2024	2025	2026
Masters Tournament					T23			50	CUT
PGA Championship	T35	T54			CUT	CUT		T37	CUT
U.S. Open				CUT				1	CUT
The Open Championship			NT					T23	T40

Win
Did not play

CUT = missed the halfway cut
"T" indicates a tie for a place
NT = no tournament due to COVID-19 pandemic

=== Summary ===
Tournament	Wins	2nd	3rd	Top-5	Top-10	Top-25	Events	Cuts made
Masters Tournament	0	0	0	0	0	1	3	2
PGA Championship	0	0	0	0	0	0	6	3
U.S. Open	1	0	0	1	1	1	3	1
The Open Championship	0	0	0	0	0	1	2	2
Totals	1	0	0	1	1	3	14	8

- Most consecutive cuts made – 4 (2025 Masters – 2025 Open Championship)
- Longest streak of top-10s – 1 (once)

== Results in The Players Championship ==
Tournament	2018	2019	2020	2021	2022	2023	2024	2025	2026
The Players Championship	CUT	WD	C		CUT	CUT	T64	2	T24

Top 10
Did not play

CUT = missed the halfway cut
WD = withdrew
"T" indicates a tie for a place
C = canceled after the first-round due to the COVID-19 pandemic

== Results in World Golf Championships ==
Tournament	2023
Match Play	R16

Top 10

QF, R16, R32, R64 = Round in which player lost in match play

== U.S. national team appearances ==
Professional

- Ryder Cup: 2025

Ryder Cup points record
2025	Total
2	2

== See also ==
- 2016 Web.com Tour Finals graduates
- 2021 Korn Ferry Tour Finals graduates
