= 2015 PGA Tour Canada =

Golf tour season

2015 PGA Tour Canada season
- Duration: May 25, 2015 – September 20, 2015
- Number of official events: 12
- Most wins: (Taiwan) Pan Cheng-tsung (2)
- Order of Merit: (United States) J. J. Spaun

The 2015 PGA Tour Canada, titled as the 2015 Mackenzie Tour-PGA Tour Canada for sponsorship reasons, was the 30th season of the Canadian Tour, and the third under the operation and running of the PGA Tour.

== Mackenzie title sponsorship ==
In May, it was announced that the tour had signed a title sponsorship agreement with Mackenzie Investments, being renamed as the Mackenzie Tour-PGA Tour Canada.

== Schedule ==
The following table lists official events during the 2015 season.

Date	Tournament	Location	Purse (C$)	Winner (Note: The number in parentheses after each winner's name is the number of PGA Tour Canada events they had won up to and including that tournament. It is rare for someone to accumulate many wins on PGA Tour Canada as success at this level usually leads to promotion to the Web.com Tour.)	OWGR points
May 31	PC Financial Open	British Columbia	175,000	(United States) Drew Weaver (1)	6
Jun 7	Bayview Place Island Savings Open	British Columbia	175,000	(Canada) Albin Choi (1)	6
Jun 28	Syncrude Boreal Open	Alberta	175,000	(Canada) Kevin Spooner (1)	6
Jul 5	SIGA Dakota Dunes Open	Saskatchewan	175,000	(United States) Michael Letzig (1)	6
Jul 12	The Players Cup	Manitoba	175,000	(Taiwan) Pan Cheng-tsung (1)	6
Jul 19	Staal Foundation Open	Ontario	175,000	(United States) J. J. Spaun (1)	6
Aug 2	ATB Financial Classic	Alberta	175,000	(United States) Daniel Miernicki (1)	6
Aug 23	National Capital Open to Support Our Troops	Ontario	175,000	(United States) Sam Ryder (1)	6
Aug 30	Great Waterway Classic	Ontario	175,000	(Canada) Brad Clapp (1)	6
Sep 6	Wildfire Invitational	Ontario	175,000	(Canada) Christopher Ross (1)	6
Sep 13	Cape Breton Celtic Classic	Nova Scotia	175,000	(Taiwan) Pan Cheng-tsung (2)	6
Sep 20	Freedom 55 Financial Championship	Ontario	200,000	(United States) Jason Millard (1)	6

== Order of Merit ==
The Order of Merit was based on prize money won during the season, calculated in Canadian dollars. The top five players on the Order of Merit earned status to play on the 2016 Web.com Tour.

Position	Player	Prize money (C$)
1	(United States) J. J. Spaun	91,193
2	(Taiwan) Pan Cheng-tsung	79,896
3	(Canada) Taylor Pendrith	60,736
4	(United States) Sam Ryder	57,168
5	(United States) Jason Millard	57,040

== See also ==
- 2015 PGA Tour China
- 2015 PGA Tour Latinoamérica
