= 2022 PGA Tour Canada =

Golf tour season

2022 PGA Tour Canada season
- Duration: June 2, 2022 – September 18, 2022
- Number of official events: 10 (Note: One further tournament was scheduled but was canceled.)
- Most wins: (Canada) Wil Bateman (2) (United States) Noah Goodwin (2)
- Order of Merit: (Canada) Wil Bateman

The 2022 PGA Tour Canada was the 36th season of the Canadian Tour, and the ninth under the operation and running of the PGA Tour.

== Changes for 2022 ==
=== Order of Merit name change ===
It was the first season in which the Order of Merit was rebranded as the Fortinet Cup.

== Schedule ==
The following table lists official events during the 2022 season.

Date	Tournament	Location	Purse (C$)	Winner (Note: The number in parentheses after each winner's name is the number of PGA Tour Canada events they had won up to and including that tournament. It is rare for someone to accumulate many wins on PGA Tour Canada as success at this level usually leads to promotion to the Korn Ferry Tour.)	OWGR points
Jun 5	Royal Beach Victoria Open	British Columbia	200,000	(United States) Scott Stevens (1)	6
Jun 19	ATB Classic	Alberta	225,000	(Canada) Wil Bateman (1)	6
~~Jun 26~~	Elk Ridge Open	Saskatchewan	–	Canceled (Note: Tournament cancelled due to ongoing flooding of the course.)	–
Jul 3	Prince Edward Island Open	Prince Edward Island	200,000	(United States) Brian Carlson (1)	6
Jul 24	Osprey Valley Open	Ontario	225,000	(United States) Danny Walker (2)	6
Jul 31	Sotheby’s International Realty Canada Ontario Open	Ontario	200,000	(United States) Noah Goodwin (1)	6
Aug 7	Quebec Open	Quebec	200,000	(United States) Ryan Gerard (1)	6
Aug 21	CentrePort Canada Rail Park Manitoba Open	Manitoba	200,000	(United States) Parker Coody (1)	5.59
Aug 28	CRMC Championship	United States	200,000	(United States) Jake Knapp (3)	5.76
Sep 4	GolfBC Championship	British Columbia	200,000	(United States) Noah Goodwin (2)	5.33
Sep 18	Fortinet Cup Championship	Ontario	225,000	(Canada) Wil Bateman (2)	3.70

== Order of Merit ==
The Order of Merit was titled as the Fortinet Cup and was based on tournament results during the season, calculated using a points-based system. The top five players on the Order of Merit earned status to play on the 2023 Korn Ferry Tour.

Position	Player	Points
1	(Canada) Wil Bateman	1,654
2	(United States) Jake Knapp	1,117
3	(United States) Noah Goodwin	1,063
4	(United States) Scott Stevens	1,055
5	(United States) Ryan Gerard	899

== See also ==
- 2022 PGA Tour Latinoamérica
