= Mark Silvers =

American professional golfer (born 1986)

Personal information
- Nationality: United States
- Born: November 5, 1986 (age 39) Savannah, Georgia, U.S.
- Height: 6 ft 0 in (183 cm)
- Weight: 175 lb (79 kg)

Career
- Sport: Golf
- College: University of South Carolina
- Turned professional: 2009
- Current tour: Web.com Tour
- Former tour: PGA Tour Canada

Number of wins by tour
- PGA Tour: 1

Best results in major championships
- Masters Tournament: DNP
- PGA Championship: DNP
- U.S. Open: T54: 2015
- The Open Championship: DNP

Mark Silvers (born November 5, 1986) is an American professional golfer and low level amateur pickleball player.

== Early life and amateur career ==
Silvers was born in Savannah, Georgia. He was an All-American at the University of South Carolina.

== Professional career ==
In 2009, Silvers competed on mini-tours after turning professional. He won Golf Channel's reality show, Big Break Greenbrier in 2012, earning an exemption into the 2013 Greenbrier Classic on the PGA Tour.

Silvers played on PGA Tour Canada in 2014, winning one event and finishing 10th on the Order of Merit. He finished T-14 at the Web.com Tour Qualifying School to earn his 2015 Web.com Tour card.

Silvers finished tied for 54th at the 2015 U.S. Open. Silvers qualified for the tournament by earning medalist honors at sectional qualifying after being an alternate due to his performance at local qualifying.

== Professional wins (1) ==
=== PGA Tour Canada wins (1) ===
No.	Date	Tournament	Winning score	Margin of victory	Runner-up
1	Sep 7, 2014	Cape Breton Celtic Classic	−15 (70-65-72-66=273)	Playoff	(United States) Matt Harmon
