= Live and Work in Maine Open =

Tournament information
- Location: Falmouth, Maine
- Established: 2020
- Course: Falmouth Country Club
- Par: 71
- Length: 7,299 yards (6,674 m)
- Tour: Korn Ferry Tour
- Format: Stroke play
- Prize fund: US$750,000
- Final year: 2022

Tournament record score
- Aggregate: 264 Pierceson Coody (2022)
- To par: −20 as above

Final champion
- (United States) Pierceson Coody

Location map
- Location in the United States Location in Maine

The Live and Work in Maine Open was a golf tournament on the Korn Ferry Tour. It was first played in June 2021 at Falmouth Country Club in Falmouth, Maine; it had been scheduled to be played in 2020, but was canceled due to the COVID-19 pandemic.

== Winners ==
Year	Winner	Score	To par	Margin of victory	Runner-up
2022	(United States) Pierceson Coody	264	−20	5 strokes	(United States) Jacob Bergeron
2021	(United States) Chad Ramey	268	−16	1 stroke	(United States) Joshua Creel
2020	Canceled due to the COVID-19 pandemic				
