= Pierceson Coody =

American professional golfer (born 2000)

Personal information
- Nationality: United States
- Born: January 7, 2000 (age 26) Plano, Texas, U.S.

Career
- Sport: Golf
- College: University of Texas
- Turned professional: 2022
- Current tour: PGA Tour
- Former tour: Korn Ferry Tour
- Professional wins: 3
- Highest ranking: 44 (February 8, 2026) (as of October 25, 2026)

Number of wins by tour
- Korn Ferry Tour: 3

Best results in major championships
- Masters Tournament: DNP
- PGA Championship: CUT: 2026
- U.S. Open: T23: 2026
- The Open Championship: T28: 2026

Pierceson Coody (/ˈku.di/ KOO-dee; born January 7, 2000) is an American professional golfer who currently plays on the PGA Tour.

== Amateur career ==
Coody had a successful amateur career before and during college. He won the 2018 Byron Nelson Junior Championship (and was runner up in 2015) and the 2016 Jordan Speith Tournament in high school and was also a State High School regional Champ in 2016.

Coody attended the University of Texas at Austin between 2018 and 2022, majoring in Corporate Communication. Playing with the Texas Longhorns men's golf team, he earned All-American honors in 2020, 2021 and 2022 after being an honorable mention in 2019 and helped the Longhorns win the 2022 NCAA Division I Men's Golf Championship.

As an amateur he won the 2018 South Beach International, the 2019 Trans-Mississippi Amateur, the 2020 Western Amateur, the 2021 George Hannon Collegiate and the 2022 Augusta Haskins Award Invitational. He was the 2021 Big 12 Men's Golf Player of the Year and made the All-Big 12 team, and the All-Big 12 Academic team, in 2021 and 2022. He ascended to the top of the World Amateur Golf Ranking in April 2021.

== Professional career ==
Coody topped the PGA Tour University rankings and received a spot on the Korn Ferry Tour in 2022. He turned professional in 2022 and won the Live and Work in Maine Open by five strokes in his third start. He went on to win two other Korn Ferry events and place in the top 10 several other times.

In 2023, he secured his PGA Tour card by finishing ranked in the top 30 of the Korn Ferry Tour.

His first season on the PGA Tour full-time was 2024. At the ISCO Championship, Coody led on each of the first three days of golf but finished the 4th day in a 5 way tie for first. During sudden death play, two other players were eliminated, but Coody and Matt NeSmith lost to Harry Hall when Hall sunk a 45 foot chip from off the green to win.

In 2025, he played on both the Korn Ferry and PGA Tours. He had 6 top-10 finishes on the Korn Ferry Tour, including tying for 2nd twice and also missed a pair of cuts in August. He finished 12th on the rankings list and again earned a PGA Tour card for 2026. On the PGA Tour, he tied for 3rd at both the 3M Open and the Bank of Utah Championship.

In 2026, he was back on the PGA Tour full-time and made it to his first FedEx Cup Playoffs, powered in part by a tie for 2nd at the Farmer's Insurance Open. He finished ranked 55th after the first round of the playoffs, which eliminated him from the second event, but earned him a full tour card for the 2027 season.

== Personal life ==
Pierceson has a twin brother, Parker, who is 37 minutes older. Both are third-generation professional golfers. Their father Kyle played collegiately at the University of Texas and on the Asian Tour and Nike Tour in the 1990s, and their grandfather Charles played on the PGA Tour and won three times, including the 1971 Masters Tournament.

== Amateur wins ==
- 2016 Under Armour-Jordan Spieth Championship
- 2018 Thunderbird International Junior, Byron Nelson Junior Championship, South Beach International Amateur
- 2019 Trans-Mississippi Amateur
- 2020 Western Amateur
- 2021 George Hannon Collegiate
- 2022 Augusta Haskins Award Invite

== Professional wins (3) ==
=== Korn Ferry Tour wins (3) ===
No.	Date	Tournament	Winning score	Margin of victory	Runner(s)-up
1	Jun 26, 2022	Live and Work in Maine Open	−15 (69-62-67-66=264)	5 strokes	(United States) Jacob Bergeron
2	Feb 5, 2023	Panama Championship	−11 (72-68-71-66=277)	Playoff	(United States) Mac Meissner, (United States) Sam Saunders
3	Jul 23, 2023	Price Cutter Charity Championship	−25 (63-68-65-67=263)	2 strokes	(United States) Parker Coody, (United States) Chandler Phillips, (Canada) Ben Silverman, (United States) Thomas Walsh

Korn Ferry Tour playoff record (1–0)

No.	Year	Tournament	Opponents	Result
1	2023	Panama Championship	(United States) Mac Meissner, (United States) Sam Saunders	Won with birdie on first extra hole

== Playoff record ==
PGA Tour playoff record (0–1)

No.	Year	Tournament	Opponents	Result
1	2024	ISCO Championship	(United States) Zac Blair, (England) Harry Hall, (Philippines) Rico Hoey, (United States) Matthew NeSmith	Hall won with birdie on third extra hole Blair and Hoey eliminated by par on first hole

== Results in major championships ==
Tournament	2021	2022	2023	2024	2025	2026
Masters Tournament						
PGA Championship						CUT
U.S. Open	CUT					T23
The Open Championship						T28

Did not play

CUT = missed the half-way cut
"T" indicates a tie for a place

== U.S. national team appearances ==
Amateur

- Arnold Palmer Cup: 2020, 2021 (winners)
- Walker Cup: 2021 (winners)

== See also ==
- 2023 Korn Ferry Tour graduates
- 2025 Korn Ferry Tour graduates
