= Danny Walker (golfer) =

American professional golfer (born 1995)

Personal information
- Nationality: United States
- Born: October 4, 1995 (age 31) Bradenton, Florida, U.S.
- Height: 6 ft 0 in (183 cm)
- Weight: 175 lb (79 kg)

Career
- Sport: Golf
- College: University of Virginia
- Turned professional: 2018
- Current tour: PGA Tour
- Former tours: Korn Ferry Tour; PGA Tour Canada; PGA Tour Latinoamérica
- Professional wins: 2

Danny Walker (born October 4, 1995) is an American professional golfer.

== Early life ==
Walker was born in Bradenton, Florida, to Tessa and James Walker. Walker attended Lakewood Ranch High School and was extremely successful, helping the team to three consecutive state titles between 2011 and 2013.

== College career ==
Walker went to the University of Virginia between 2014 and 2017 and claimed one title – the 2016 South Beach International Amateur. During his time at Virginia, Walker also helped UVA to a program-best 10th place at the NCAA Division 1 Men's Golf Championship.

== Professional career ==
Walker turned professional in 2018 and played on PGA Tour Canada. He got his first victory in his 12th start at the Freedom 55 Financial Championship, resulting in him moving up to the Korn Ferry Tour.

Walker struggled between 2019 and 2021, getting relegated to the PGA Tour Latinoamérica. He briefly gave up professional golf near the end of 2020, taking a job as a waiter at a Bahama Breeze for two weeks before deciding to give professional golf another go.

Returning to PGA Tour Canada, Walker won the 2022 Osprey Valley Open and finished higher enough to move up to the Korn Ferry Tour again for 2023. Walker finished 28th in the 2024 Korn Ferry Tour season, resulting in him moving up to the PGA Tour.

In 2025, after getting into the Players Championship as an alternate and making the cut on the number, Walker shot a 6-under-par 66 in the third round under tough windy conditions, tied for lowest score of that round, and eventually finished tied for 6th. At the Sanderson Farms Championship, Walker made 450 feet of putts after 3 rounds, breaking the PGA Tour record.

== Amateur wins ==
- 2016 South Beach International Amateur

== Professional wins (2) ==
=== PGA Tour Canada wins (2) ===
No.	Date	Tournament	Winning score	Margin of victory	Runner(s)-up
1	Sep 16, 2018	Freedom 55 Financial Championship	−19 (63-68-66-64=261)	2 strokes	(United States) George Cunningham, (United States) Jonathan Garrick
2	Jul 24, 2022	Osprey Valley Open	−16 (69-62-69-68=268)	Playoff	(United States) Cooper Musselman
