= 2014 PGA Tour Canada =

Golf tour season

2014 PGA Tour Canada season
- Duration: May 29, 2014 – September 14, 2014
- Number of official events: 12
- Most wins: (United States) Joel Dahmen (2)
- Order of Merit: (United States) Joel Dahmen

The 2014 PGA Tour Canada was the 29th season of the Canadian Tour, and the second under the operation and running of the PGA Tour.

== Schedule ==
The following table lists official events during the 2014 season.

Date	Tournament	Location	Purse (C$)	Winner (Note: The number in parentheses after each winner's name is the number of PGA Tour Canada events they had won up to and including that tournament. It is rare for someone to accumulate many wins on PGA Tour Canada as success at this level usually leads to promotion to the Web.com Tour.)	OWGR points
Jun 1	PC Financial Open	British Columbia	150,000	(United States) Joel Dahmen (1)	6
Jun 8	Bayview Place Island Savings Open	British Columbia	150,000	(United States) Josh Persons (1)	6
Jun 22	Syncrude Boreal Open	Alberta	150,000	(United States) Joel Dahmen (2)	6
Jul 6	SIGA Dakota Dunes Open	Saskatchewan	150,000	(United States) Matt Harmon (1)	6
Jul 13	The Players Cup	Manitoba	150,000	(United States) Tim Madigan (1)	6
Jul 20	Staal Foundation Open	Ontario	150,000	(United States) Wes Homan (1)	6
Aug 3	ATB Financial Classic	Alberta	150,000	(United States) Brock Mackenzie (2)	6
Aug 10	Forces and Families Open	Ontario	150,000	(Canada) Greg Machtaler (1)	6
Aug 24	Great Waterway Classic	Ontario	150,000	(United States) David Bradshaw (1)	6
Aug 31	Wildfire Invitational	Ontario	150,000	(United States) Nate McCoy (1)	6
Sep 7	Cape Breton Celtic Classic	Nova Scotia	150,000	(United States) Mark Silvers (1)	6
Sep 14	Tour Championship of Canada	Ontario	150,000	(Canada) Ryan Williams (1)	6

== Order of Merit ==
The Order of Merit was based on prize money won during the season, calculated in Canadian dollars. The top five players on the Order of Merit earned status to play on the 2015 Web.com Tour.

Position	Player	Prize money (C$)
1	(United States) Joel Dahmen	80,992
2	(United States) Matt Harmon	60,119
3	(United States) Tim Madigan	59,436
4	(United States) Brock Mackenzie	56,222
5	(England) Greg Eason	43,367

== See also ==
- 2014 PGA Tour China
- 2014 PGA Tour Latinoamérica
