= Jason Millard =

American professional golfer (born 1989)

Personal information
- Nationality: United States
- Born: September 2, 1989 (age 37) Murfreesboro, Tennessee, U.S.
- Height: 5 ft 9 in (1.75 m)
- Weight: 165 lb (75 kg; 11.8 st)

Career
- Sport: Golf
- College: Middle Tennessee State University
- Turned professional: 2011
- Former tours: Web.com Tour; PGA Tour Canada
- Professional wins: 3

Jason Millard (born September 2, 1989) is an American professional golfer.

Millard initially qualified for the 2014 U.S. Open, but later disqualified himself over a potential infraction.

In 2015 Millard won the Freedom 55 Financial Championship to finish fifth in the 2015 PGA Tour Canada Order of Merit. This finish gives him a conditional status for the 2016 Web.com Tour. He improved his status with a T2 finish at the Web.com Tour Qualifying Tournament.

== Professional wins (3) ==
=== PGA Tour Canada wins (1) ===
No.	Date	Tournament	Winning score	Margin of victory	Runner-up
1	Sep 20, 2015	Freedom 55 Financial Championship	−15 (67-63-67-68=265)	Playoff	(Canada) Ryan Williams

=== Other wins (2) ===
- 2016 Tennessee Open
- 2019 Maine Open
