= Matthew NeSmith =

American professional golfer (born 1993)

Personal information
- Nationality: United States
- Born: September 29, 1993 (age 33) North Augusta, South Carolina, U.S.
- Height: 6 ft 0 in (1.83 m)
- Weight: 215 lb (98 kg; 15.4 st)
- Spouse: Abigail NeSmith

Career
- Sport: Golf
- College: University of South Carolina
- Turned professional: 2016
- Current tour: PGA Tour
- Former tours: Korn Ferry Tour; PGA Tour Canada
- Professional wins: 1
- Highest ranking: 89 (October 16, 2022) (as of October 25, 2026)

Number of wins by tour
- Korn Ferry Tour: 1

Best results in major championships
- Masters Tournament: DNP
- PGA Championship: T23: 2023
- U.S. Open: T37: 2022
- The Open Championship: DNP

Matthew NeSmith (born September 29, 1993) is an American professional golfer.

== Early life and amateur career ==
In 1993, NeSmith was born in North Augusta, South Carolina. He won the 2011 Junior Heritage and the 2015 Players Amateur.

== Professional career ==
On the 2019 Korn Ferry Tour, NeSmith won the Albertsons Boise Open to secure his PGA Tour card.

After the first round, NeSmith held the lead at the 2021 Phoenix Open. NeSmith ended the tournament tied in seventh.

In March 2022, NeSmith recorded his best PGA Tour finish, with a T3 at the Valspar Championship, one shot outside of the playoff between Sam Burns, and Davis Riley.

In July 2024, NeSmith was in second place after the 3M Open third round but finished T9.

== Amateur wins ==
- 2011 Polo Junior Classic, Jones Cup Junior Invitational
- 2012 Azalea Invitational, FJ Invitational, Rolex Tournament of Champions
- 2015 Hootie @ Bulls Bay Intercollegiate, SEC Championship, Players Amateur
- 2016 The Cleveland Golf Palmetto Invite, General Hackler Championship

== Professional wins (1) ==
=== Korn Ferry Tour wins (1) ===
Legend
Finals events (1)
Other Korn Ferry Tour (0)

No.	Date	Tournament	Winning score	Margin of victory	Runners-up
1	Aug 25, 2019	Albertsons Boise Open	−19 (70-64-67-64=265)	1 stroke	(United States) Brandon Hagy, (Norway) Viktor Hovland

== Playoff record ==
PGA Tour playoff record (0–1)

No.	Year	Tournament	Opponents	Result
1	2024	ISCO Championship	(United States) Zac Blair, (United States) Pierceson Coody, (England) Harry Hall, (Philippines) Rico Hoey	Hall won with birdie on third extra hole Blair and Hoey eliminated by par on first hole

== Results in major championships ==
Results not in chronological order in 2020.

Tournament	2015	2016	2017	2018
Masters Tournament				
U.S. Open	CUT			
The Open Championship				
PGA Championship				

Tournament	2019	2020	2021	2022	2023
Masters Tournament					
PGA Championship					T23
U.S. Open				T37	
The Open Championship		NT			

Did not play

CUT = missed the halfway cut
NT = No tournament due to the COVID-19 pandemic

== Results in The Players Championship ==
Tournament	2021	2022	2023	2024
The Players Championship	CUT	CUT	CUT	T26

CUT = missed the halfway cut
"T" indicates a tie for a place

== See also ==
- 2019 Korn Ferry Tour Finals graduates
