= Joel Dahmen =

American professional golfer (born 1987)

Personal information
- Full name: Joel Isaac Dahmen
- Nationality: United States
- Born: November 11, 1987 (age 38) Clarkston, Washington, U.S.
- Height: 5 ft 11 in (1.80 m)
- Weight: 176 lb (80 kg; 12.6 st)
- Spouse: Lona Skutt (m. 2018)

Career
- Sport: Golf
- College: University of Washington
- Turned professional: 2010
- Current tour: PGA Tour
- Former tours: Web.com Tour; PGA Tour Canada; PGA Tour Latinoamérica; Gateway Tour
- Professional wins: 6
- Highest ranking: 58 (October 25, 2020) (as of October 25, 2026)

Number of wins by tour
- PGA Tour: 1
- Other: 5

Best results in major championships
- Masters Tournament: DNP
- PGA Championship: T10: 2020
- U.S. Open: T10: 2022
- The Open Championship: T46: 2021

Achievements and awards
- PGA Tour Canada Order of Merit winner: 2014

Joel Isaac Dahmen (born November 11, 1987) is an American professional golfer who plays on the PGA Tour.

Born and raised in Clarkston, Washington, Dahmen first gained recognition as a two-time high school state champion while at Clarkston High School, before playing a year of college golf at the University of Washington in Seattle. He turned professional and initially played on PGA Tour Canada from 2010 to 2013, with limited success until 2014, when he won twice and topped the Order of Merit, securing his Web.com Tour card for 2015. Dahmen's career on the Web.com Tour included making the cut in several events and earning his PGA Tour card for the 2016–17 season by finishing 25th on the money list.

Dahmen's professional achievements include finishing second at the 2019 Wells Fargo Championship and winning his first PGA Tour title at the Corales Puntacana Resort and Club Championship in March 2021. Dahmen suffered from testicular cancer but made a recovery. He appears in each season of the sports documentary series Full Swing.

== Amateur career ==
Born and raised in Clarkston, Washington, Dahmen was a two-time state champion (class 3A) at Clarkston High School, with titles in his freshman and senior years (and runner-up by a stroke as a junior). He played one year of college golf at the University of Washington in Seattle.

== Professional career ==
Dahmen played on PGA Tour Canada from 2010 to 2013 without much success. In 2014, however, he won twice and won the Order of Merit to gain his Web.com Tour card for 2015. He also played three events on PGA Tour Latinoamérica in late 2014, finishing tied for second in two of them.

On the Web.com Tour in 2015, Dahmen made the cut in 12 of 25 events, including three top-10 finishes. He advanced to the Web.com Tour Finals but failed to earn a PGA Tour card. Returning to the Web.com Tour in 2016, he made 13 cuts in 20 events in the regular season including two tied for third finishes. He earned his PGA Tour card for 2017 by finishing 25th on the money list by $975.

On the 2016–17 PGA Tour season, Dahmen finished 176 in the FedEx Cup rankings with his best finish being a T9. He finished 24th in the Web.com Tour Finals and regained his PGA Tour card for the 2017–18 season.

At the 2019 Wells Fargo Championship, Dahmen finished second to Max Homa, who got his first career PGA Tour win by 3 strokes.

In March 2021, Dahmen won his first PGA Tour title at the Corales Puntacana Resort and Club Championship in the Dominican Republic.

Dahmen retained his PGA Tour Card for the 2025 season on the final day of the final competition of the FedEx Cup Fall Series at the RSM Classic. He scored a 65 and ended the competition at T35 to finish at 124th in the FedEx Cup, one place above earning a Tour Card status..

On July 15, 2025, Dahmen announced that he had split from long time caddy and childhood friend Geno Bonnalie.

== Personal life ==
Dahmen previously suffered from testicular cancer.

Dahmen appeared in the sports documentary series Full Swing, which premiered on Netflix on February 15, 2023.

In January 2023, Dahmen and his wife announced the birth of their first child.

== Professional wins (6) ==
=== PGA Tour wins (1) ===
No.	Date	Tournament	Winning score	Margin of victory	Runners-up
1	Mar 28, 2021	Corales Puntacana Resort and Club Championship	−12 (67-71-68-70=276)	1 stroke	(Puerto Rico) Rafael Campos, (United States) Sam Ryder

=== PGA Tour Canada wins (2) ===
No.	Date	Tournament	Winning score	Margin of victory	Runner(s)-up
1	Jun 1, 2014	PC Financial Open	−16 (66-70-68-68=272)	1 stroke	(Canada) Brad Clapp, (Canada) Eugene Wong
2	Jun 22, 2014	Syncrude Boreal Open	−22 (63-66-68-69=266)	5 strokes	(United States) Richard McDonald

=== Gateway Tour wins (3) ===
- 2012 Tournament 7
- 2013 Arizona Winter 3, Arizona Spring 3

== Results in major championships ==
Results not in chronological order in 2020.

Tournament	2019	2020	2021	2022	2023
Masters Tournament					
PGA Championship	T71	T10	T55	CUT	T69
U.S. Open	CUT	CUT		T10	CUT
The Open Championship	CUT	NT	T46		

Top 10
Did not play

CUT = missed the half-way cut
"T" = tied
NT = No tournament due to COVID-19 pandemic

== Results in The Players Championship ==
Tournament	2019	2020	2021	2022	2023	2024	2025	2026
The Players Championship	T12	C	CUT	T33	T60	T11	T54	CUT

CUT = missed the halfway cut
"T" indicates a tie for a place
C = canceled after the first round due to the COVID-19 pandemic

== Results in World Golf Championships ==
Tournament	2020
Championship	
Match Play	NT^{1}
Invitational	T20
Champions	NT^{1}

^{1}Cancelled due to COVID-19 pandemic

Did not play

NT = No tournament
"T" = Tied

== See also ==
- 2016 Web.com Tour Finals graduates
- 2017 Web.com Tour Finals graduates
