= Players Amateur =

The Players Amateur was an annual amateur golf tournament. It was played from 2000 to 2019. It was organized by the Heritage Classic Foundation, which also sponsored the RBC Heritage on the PGA Tour. It was last played at Berkeley Hall Club in Bluffton, South Carolina.

== Winners ==
- 2019 Spencer Ralston
- 2018 John Augenstein
- 2017 Philip Knowles
- 2016 Jin Cheng
- 2015 Matthew NeSmith
- 2014 Scott Vincent
- 2013 Hunter Stewart
- 2012 Daniel Nisbet
- 2011 Corbin Mills
- 2010 Kevin Tway
- 2009 Bud Cauley
- 2008 Mark Anderson
- 2007 Rickie Fowler
- 2006 Jonathan Moore
- 2005 Brian Harman
- 2004 Aron Price
- 2003 Camilo Villegas
- 2002 Bill Haas
- 2001 Michael Sims
- 2000 Ben Curtis
