= Zac Blair =

American professional golfer (born 1990)

Personal information
- Full name: Zachary James Blair
- Nationality: United States
- Born: August 20, 1990 (age 36) Salt Lake City, Utah, U.S.
- Height: 5 ft 6 in (1.68 m)
- Weight: 155 lb (70 kg; 11.1 st)
- Spouse: Alicia Blair

Career
- Sport: Golf
- College: Brigham Young University
- Turned professional: 2014
- Current tour: PGA Tour
- Former tours: Korn Ferry Tour; PGA Tour Latinoamérica
- Professional wins: 3
- Highest ranking: 92 (October 22, 2023) (as of October 25, 2026)

Number of wins by tour
- Korn Ferry Tour: 1
- Other: 2

Best results in major championships
- Masters Tournament: DNP
- PGA Championship: T53: 2024
- U.S. Open: T26: 2024
- The Open Championship: DNP

Zachary James Blair (born August 20, 1990) is an American professional golfer who plays on the PGA Tour. He has previously played on the Korn Ferry Tour and PGA Tour Latinoamérica.

== Early life and amateur career ==
Blair was born in Salt Lake City, Utah. He was on the Brigham Young University's golf team from 2009 to 2013. He was an All-American in 2012 and won four college events. His father, James, played golf at Brigham Young University from 1974 to 1977. Blair also won the 2011 Pacific Northwest Amateur.

== Professional career ==
Blair competed in the 2013 Web.com Tour Qualifying School as an amateur, reaching Final Stage and earning limited status on the Web.com Tour. After turning professional, Blair began playing on PGA Tour Latinoamérica in March 2014. He played in seven events, making the cut six times and finishing in the top-10 three times. He played eight events on the Web.com Tour, making seven cuts including a T-2 finish at the Price Cutter Charity Championship and qualifying for the Web.com Tour Finals. After missing the cut in the first three events, he finished second at the Web.com Tour Championship and earned his PGA Tour card for the 2014–15 season.

On the PGA Tour, his best finish was a solo 3rd at the 2016 Sony Open in Hawaii until the Travelers Championship in 2023, where he finished T-2. He has played in three majors, the 2014 U.S. Open, where he placed T-40 and the 2016 PGA Championship and 2019 U.S. Open, where he missed the cut.

At the 2016 Wells Fargo Championship, Blair was disqualified for hitting himself in the head with a putter, and continuing to use it. He was disqualified for using a non-conforming club.

In the 2018 PGA Tour season, Blair made only 11 cuts in 20 events. He won $330,507 and finished 170th in the season-long FedEx Cup. As a result, he lost his PGA Tour card. Blair then attempted to get his card back via the 2018 Web.com Tour Finals, but was not successful. In October 2018, Blair missed the cut at the Alfred Dunhill Links Championship to fall to 663rd in the world ranking.

On August 4, 2019, Blair won the Ellie Mae Classic at TPC Stonebrae on the Korn Ferry Tour. This win guaranteed that Blair would regain his PGA Tour card for the 2019–20 season.

== Amateur wins ==
- 2009 Utah Amateur
- 2011 Pacific Northwest Amateur

== Professional wins (3) ==
=== Korn Ferry Tour wins (1) ===
No.	Date	Tournament	Winning score	Margin of victory	Runner-up
1	Aug 4, 2019	Ellie Mae Classic	−17 (66-65-65-67=263)	1 stroke	(United States) Brandon Crick

=== Other wins (1) ===
- 2018 Rockford Pro-Am
- 2023 Utah Open

== Playoff record ==
PGA Tour playoff record (0–1)

No.	Year	Tournament	Opponents	Result
1	2024	ISCO Championship	(United States) Pierceson Coody, (England) Harry Hall, (Philippines) Rico Hoey, (United States) Matthew NeSmith	Hall won with birdie on third extra hole Blair and Hoey eliminated by par on first hole

== Results in major championships ==
Tournament	2014	2015	2016	2017	2018
Masters Tournament					
U.S. Open	T40				
The Open Championship					
PGA Championship			CUT		

Tournament	2019	2020	2021	2022	2023	2024	2025	2026
Masters Tournament								
PGA Championship						T53		
U.S. Open	CUT					T26	CUT	T32
The Open Championship		NT						

Did not play

CUT = missed the half-way cut
"T" = tied
NT = no tournament due to COVID-19 pandemic

== See also ==
- 2014 Web.com Tour Finals graduates
- 2019 Korn Ferry Tour Finals graduates
