= 2025 Ryder Cup =

Golf tournament in Farmingdale, New York, US

45th Ryder Cup Matches
- Dates: September 26–28, 2025
- Venue: Bethpage Black Course
- Location: Farmingdale, New York
- Captains: Keegan Bradley (USA); Luke Donald (Europe)
| (United States) | 13 | 15 | (Europe) |
- Europe wins the Ryder Cup

Location map
- Location in the United States Location in New York

The 45th Ryder Cup Matches was a golf tournament in 2025 for the Ryder Cup, a biennial competition between Europe and the United States. It was held in the United States from September 26–28 on the Black Course of Bethpage State Park in Farmingdale, New York. Europe beat the United States by a score of 15 to 13, becoming the first away team to win the event since 2012.

The behavior of the American crowds during the event was criticized, with Sky News calling it "the most abusive Ryder Cup in almost a century of matches" and Rory McIlroy stating that "golf should be held to a higher standard". The President of the United States, Donald Trump, attended the event as a spectator, the first time a sitting president has attended the Ryder Cup.

== Venue ==
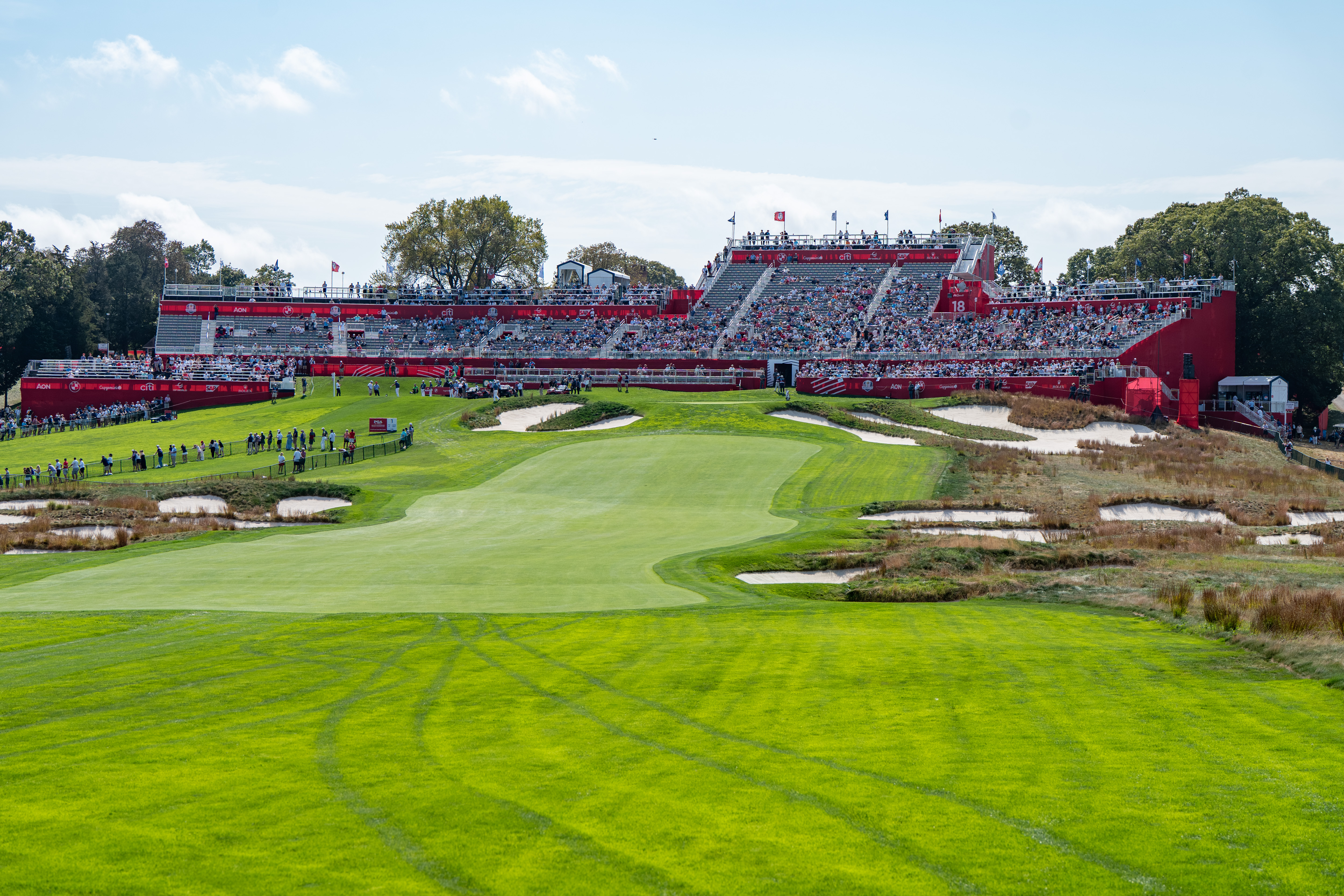
The 18th hole of Bethpage Black at the Ryder Cup

In 2013, the PGA of America announced that Bethpage Black, a public golf course in Bethpage State Park on Long Island, New York, would host the 2019 PGA Championship as well as the 2024 Ryder Cup (later delayed to 2025). Opened in 1936, Bethpage Black was designed by Joseph H. Burbeck and A. W. Tillinghast. It hosted Metropolitan PGA events such as the New York State Open and was first chosen as a venue for a top-level tournament at the 2002 U.S. Open, which Tiger Woods won.

It was the second time the state of New York had been selected as host of the Ryder Cup, after the 1995 Ryder Cup at Oak Hill Country Club, which Europe won 14 1/2 to 13 1/2.

=== Course ===
| Hole | Yards | Metres | Par | Hole | Yards | Metres | Par |
|---|---|---|---|---|---|---|---|
| 1 | 397 | 363 | 4 | 10 | 502 | 459 | 4 |
| 2 | 389 | 356 | 4 | 11 | 435 | 398 | 4 |
| 3 | 210 | 200 | 3 | 12 | 496 | 454 | 4 |
| 4 | 517 | 473 | 5 | 13 | 608 | 556 | 5 |
| 5 | 478 | 437 | 4 | 14 | 161 | 147 | 3 |
| 6 | 408 | 373 | 4 | 15 | 477 | 436 | 4 |
| 7 | 524 | 479 | 4 | 16 | 539 | 493 | 4 |
| 8 | 210 | 190 | 3 | 17 | 179 | 164 | 3 |
| 9 | 460 | 420 | 4 | 18 | 411 | 376 | 4 |
| Out | 3,593 | 3,285 | 35 | In | 3,808 | 3,482 | 35 |
| Source: | | | | Total | 7,401 | 6,767 | 70 |

== Format ==
The Ryder Cup is a match play event, with each match worth one point. The competition format was as follows:

- Day 1 (Friday) – 4 foursome (alternate shot) matches in the morning, and 4 fourball (better ball) matches in the afternoon
- Day 2 (Saturday) – 4 foursome matches in the morning, and 4 fourball matches in the afternoon
- Day 3 (Sunday) – 12 singles matches

The sessions in which the foursome and fourball matches are played on the first two days were chosen by the home team captain; Keegan Bradley's decision was announced on August 25.

With a total of 28 points available, 14 1/2 points were required to win the Cup, and 14 points were required for the defending champion to retain the Cup. All matches were played to a maximum of 18 holes.

== Teams ==
=== Captains ===
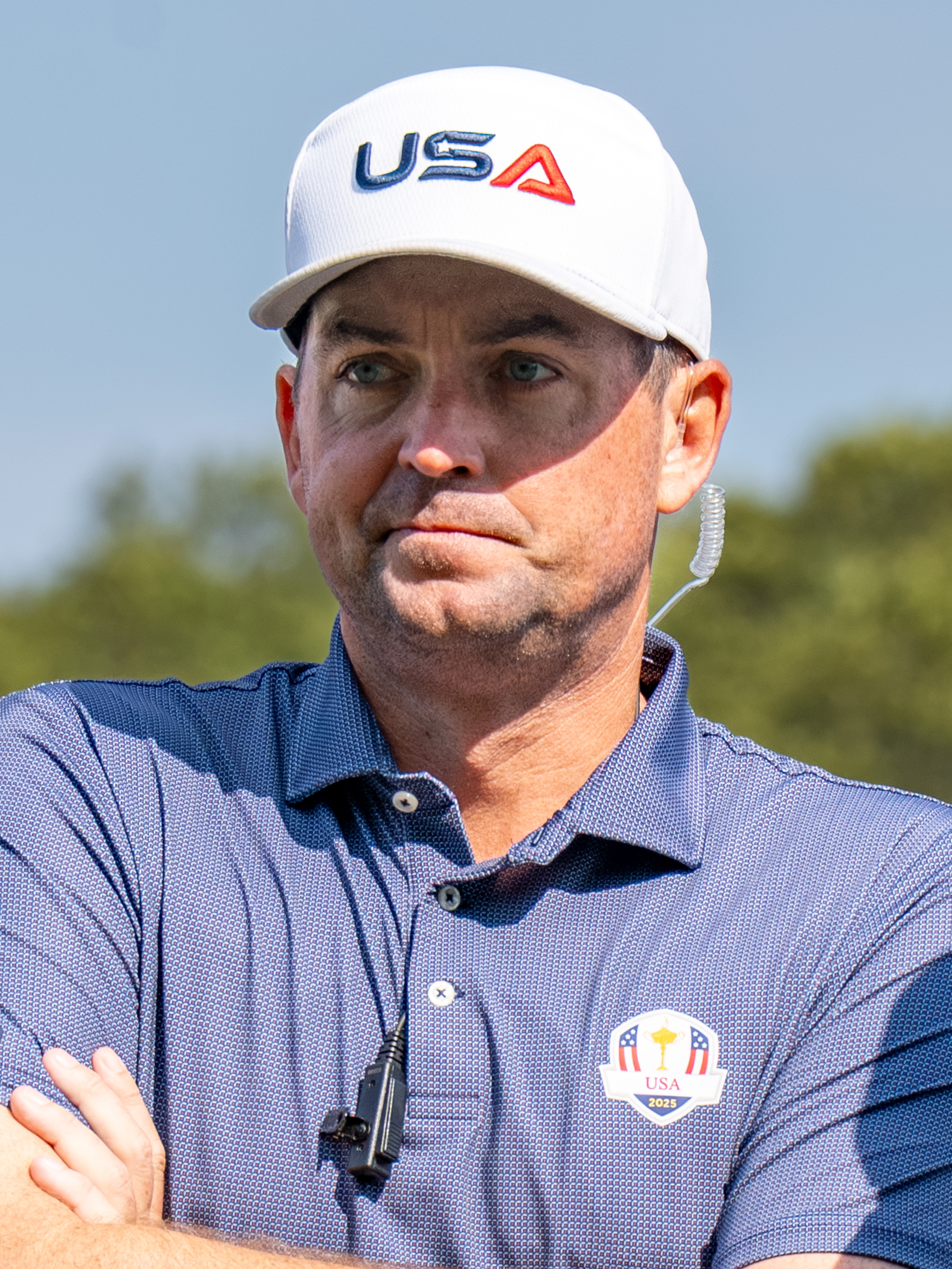
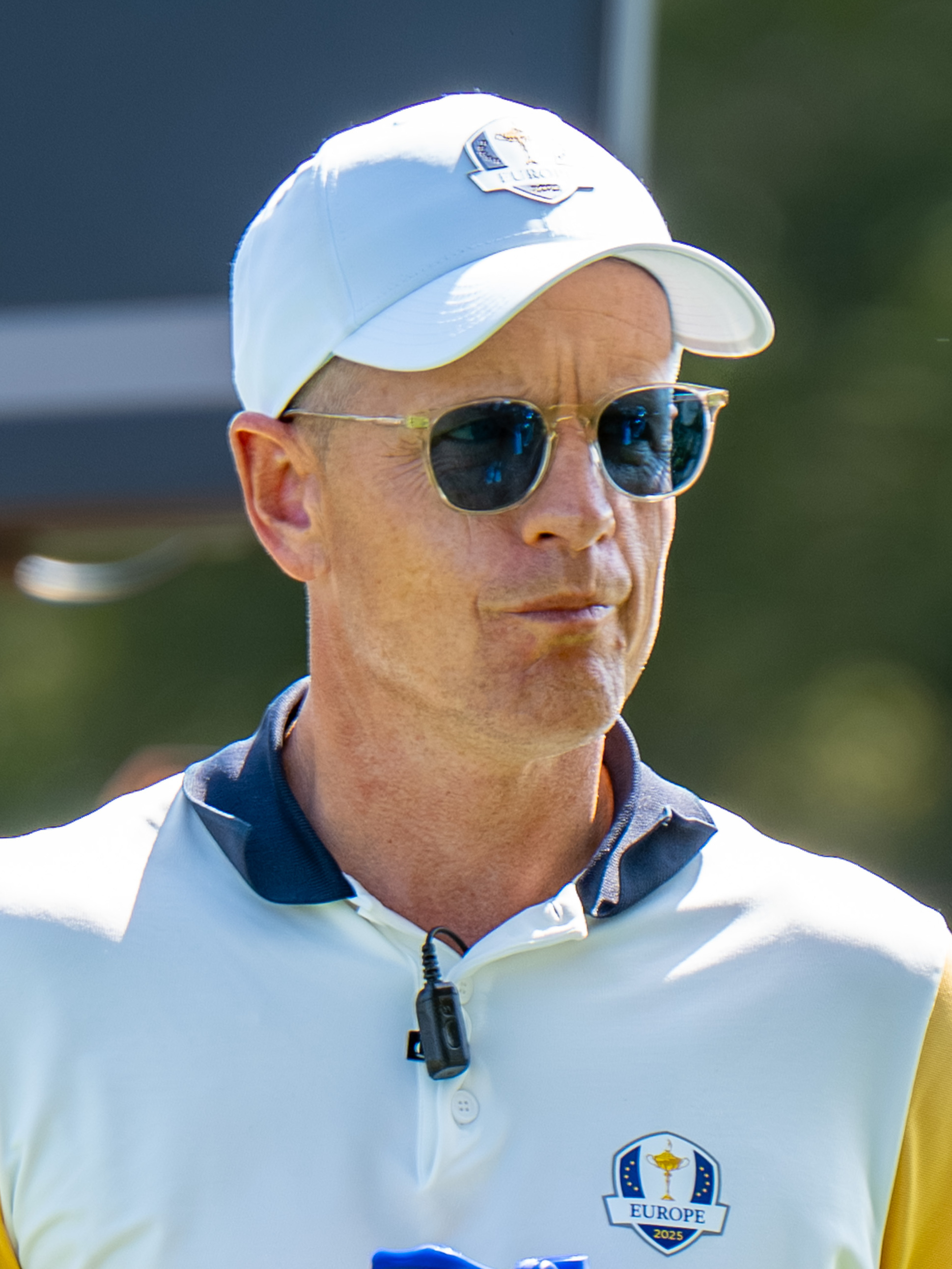
Team USA captain Keegan Bradley (left) and Team Europe captain Luke Donald

Keegan Bradley was named the U.S. team captain on July 8, 2024, becoming the youngest Ryder Cup captain since Arnold Palmer in 1963. Luke Donald was named as the European team captain on November 29, 2023, retaining the role from Europe's victorious 2023 campaign. He became the first European to repeat his captaincy since Bernard Gallacher in 1993.

=== Vice captains ===
For the U.S. team, Webb Simpson, Brandt Snedeker, Kevin Kisner, Jim Furyk, and Gary Woodland were selected as the five vice captains by Bradley.

For the European team, Thomas Bjørn, Alex Norén, Edoardo Molinari, José María Olazábal and Francesco Molinari were selected as the five vice captains, all apart from Norén rejoining with Donald from the previous edition of the competition.

=== Team selection ===
==== United States ====
The United States announced their selection criteria on October 8, 2024. The top six players in the Ryder Cup points list will receive automatic selection, and six players would receive discretionary selection by the captain, Keegan Bradley. Points are awarded as follows:

- 2024 Major Championships: 1 point per $1,000 earned.
- 2024 The Players Championship: 1 point per $1,000 earned.
- 2025 Major Championships: 1.5 points per $1,000 earned.
- 2025 PGA Tour events: 1 point per $1,000 earned at standard PGA Tour events through the BMW Championship. No points were awarded in "alternate" events.

World number one Scottie Scheffler secured his qualification in June.

| Position | Name | Points |
|---|---|---|
| 1 | Scottie Scheffler (Q) | 37,180.33 |
| 2 | J. J. Spaun (Q) | 14,851.91 |
| 3 | Xander Schauffele (Q) | 13,733.52 |
| 4 | Russell Henley (Q) | 12,276.82 |
| 5 | Harris English (Q) | 10,880.55 |
| 6 | Bryson DeChambeau (Q) | 10,774.98 |
| 7 | Justin Thomas (P) | 10,467.26 |
| 8 | Collin Morikawa (P) | 10,049.44 |
| 9 | Ben Griffin (P) | 9,745.76 |
| 10 | Maverick McNealy | 8,913.65 |
| 11 | Keegan Bradley | 8,435.00 |
| 12 | Brian Harman | 7,466.91 |
| 13 | Andrew Novak | 7,300.48 |
| 14 | Cameron Young (P) | 7,209.64 |
| 15 | Patrick Cantlay (P) | 6,716.39 |
| 16 | Sam Burns (P) | 6,688.29 |

Players in qualifying places (Q) are shown in green; captain's picks (P) are shown in yellow.

==== Europe ====
Team Europe announced their selection criteria on August 6, 2024. The top six players in the Ryder Cup points list received automatic selection while six players would receive discretionary selection by the captain, Luke Donald. Donald brought back most of his defending championship team, just switching Nicolai Højgaard with his brother Rasmus Højgaard.

There was a significant change to the points qualification, with Team Europe switching to one Ryder Cup points list, rather than the previous two. Major Championships have up to five times as many points distributed as other PGA and DP World tour events, with the points per eligible event below:

- Major Championships: 5,000 points per event.
- PGA Tour Signature Events, The Players Championship, and FedExCup Playoffs: 3,000 points per event.
- DP World Tour Rolex Series Events and PGA Tour Regular FedEx Cup Events: 2,000 points per event.
- DP World Tour 'Back 9' Events: 1,500 points per event.
- DP World Tour 'Global Series' Events and PGA TOUR 'Opposite' Events: 1,000 points per event.

The leading players in the final points lists were:

European points list
| Position | Name | Points |
|---|---|---|
| 1 | Rory McIlroy (Q) | 3489.21 |
| 2 | Robert MacIntyre (Q) | 1709.94 |
| 3 | Tommy Fleetwood (Q) | 1622.11 |
| 4 | Justin Rose (Q) | 1545.72 |
| 5 | Rasmus Højgaard (Q) | 1283.56 |
| 6 | Tyrrell Hatton (Q) | 1279.33 |
| 7 | Shane Lowry (P) | 1275.51 |
| 8 | Sepp Straka (P) | 1264.27 |
| 9 | Ludvig Åberg (P) | 1140.44 |
| 10 | Viktor Hovland (P) | 1031.34 |
| 11 | Matt Fitzpatrick (P) | 899.53 |
| 12 | Matt Wallace | 881.12 |
| 13 | Thomas Detry | 817.19 |
| 14 | Marco Penge | 810.38 |
| 15 | Aaron Rai | 754.86 |
| ... | | |
| 24 | Jon Rahm (P) | 582.39 |

Players in qualifying places (Q) are shown in green; captain's picks (P) are shown in yellow.

=== Prior playing records ===
United States team
| Name | Age | Points rank | World ranking | Previous Ryder Cups | Matches | Record | Points percentage |
|---|---|---|---|---|---|---|---|
| Scottie Scheffler | 29 | 1 | 1 | 2 | 7 | 2–2–3 | 50.00 |
| J. J. Spaun | 35 | 2 | 6 | 0 | Rookie | | |
| Xander Schauffele | 31 | 3 | 4 | 2 | 8 | 4–4–0 | 50.00 |
| Russell Henley | 36 | 4 | 3 | 0 | Rookie | | |
| Harris English | 36 | 5 | 10 | 1 | 3 | 1–2–0 | 33.33 |
| Bryson DeChambeau | 32 | 6 | 21 | 2 | 6 | 2–3–1 | 41.67 |
| Justin Thomas (P) | 32 | 7 | 5 | 3 | 13 | 7–4–2 | 61.54 |
| Collin Morikawa (P) | 28 | 8 | 8 | 2 | 8 | 4–3–1 | 56.25 |
| Ben Griffin (P) | 29 | 9 | 11 | 0 | Rookie | | |
| Cameron Young (P) | 28 | 14 | 20 | 0 | Rookie | | |
| Patrick Cantlay (P) | 33 | 15 | 22 | 2 | 8 | 5–2–1 | 68.75 |
| Sam Burns (P) | 29 | 16 | 23 | 1 | 3 | 1–2–0 | 33.33 |

Europe team
| Name | Country | Age | Points rank | World ranking | Previous Ryder Cups | Matches | Record | Points percentage |
|---|---|---|---|---|---|---|---|---|
| Rory McIlroy | Northern Ireland | 36 | 1 | 2 | 7 | 33 | 16–13–4 | 54.55 |
| Robert MacIntyre | Scotland | 29 | 2 | 9 | 1 | 3 | 2–0–1 | 83.33 |
| Tommy Fleetwood | England | 34 | 3 | 7 | 3 | 12 | 7–3–2 | 66.67 |
| Justin Rose | England | 45 | 4 | 14 | 6 | 26 | 14–9–3 | 59.62 |
| Rasmus Højgaard | Denmark | 24 | 5 | 58 | 0 | Rookie | | |
| Tyrrell Hatton | England | 33 | 6 | 25 | 3 | 11 | 5–4–2 | 54.55 |
| Shane Lowry (P) | Ireland | 38 | 7 | 24 | 2 | 6 | 2–3–1 | 41.67 |
| Sepp Straka (P) | Austria | 32 | 8 | 15 | 1 | 3 | 1–2–0 | 33.33 |
| Ludvig Åberg (P) | Sweden | 25 | 9 | 16 | 1 | 4 | 2–2–0 | 50.00 |
| Viktor Hovland (P) | Norway | 27 | 10 | 12 | 2 | 10 | 3–4–3 | 45.00 |
| Matt Fitzpatrick (P) | England | 31 | 11 | 29 | 3 | 8 | 1–7–0 | 12.50 |
| Jon Rahm (P) | Spain | 30 | 24 | 73 | 3 | 12 | 6–3–3 | 62.50 |

Captain's picks (P) are shown in yellow. World rankings and match records are prior to the start of the 2025 Ryder Cup.

== Event summary ==
=== Friday's matches ===
On Friday, President Donald Trump attended the event, the first sitting President of the United States to attend the Ryder Cup.

==== Morning foursomes ====
The opening round of four foursome matches started at 7:10 am local time. Pairings were announced on Thursday, September 25. The first point was won by Europe, with Jon Rahm and Tyrrell Hatton winning, 4 and 3, against Bryson DeChambeau and Justin Thomas. Europe won the second point of the morning with Rory McIlroy and Tommy Fleetwood winning, 5 and 4, against Collin Morikawa and Harris English.

Europe won their third consecutive point with Ludvig Åberg and Matt Fitzpatrick winning 5 and 3, against Scottie Scheffler and Russell Henley. The Americans got their first point with Xander Schauffele and Patrick Cantlay winning 2-up, against Robert MacIntyre/Viktor Hovland.

Europe had a 3–1 lead after the first session.

| | Results |
|---|---|---|
| Rahm/Hatton | (Europe) 4 & 3 | DeChambeau/Thomas |
| Åberg/Fitzpatrick | (Europe) 5 & 3 | Scheffler/Henley |
| McIlroy/Fleetwood | (Europe) 5 & 4 | Morikawa/English |
| MacIntyre/Hovland | (United States) 2 up | Schauffele/Cantlay |
| 3 | Session | 1 |
| 3 | Overall | 1 |

==== Afternoon four-ball ====
The opening round of four four-balls started at 12:25 pm local time. Pairings were announced at the end of the morning foursome matches. In the third match, Justin Thomas and Cameron Young were dominant making seven birdies in thirteen holes, winning their match 6 and 5, against Ludvig Åberg and Rasmus Højgaard, cutting the Europe lead to 3–2. In the first overall match Jon Rahm and Sepp Straka won 3 and 2, against Scottie Scheffler and J. J. Spaun, extending the Europe lead to 4–2. In the second match Tommy Fleetwood and Justin Rose won 1-up against Ben Griffin and Bryson DeChambeau, pushing the Europe lead to 5–2. In the final match Rory McIlroy and Shane Lowry halved their match with Sam Burns and Patrick Cantlay which gave the European side a 5 1/2–2 1/2 lead heading into the weekend play.

| | Results |
|---|---|---|
| Rahm/Straka | (Europe) 3 & 2 | Scheffler/Spaun |
| Fleetwood/Rose | (Europe) 1 up | Griffin/DeChambeau |
| Åberg/Højgaard | (United States) 6 & 5 | Young/Thomas |
| McIlroy/Lowry | halved | Burns/Cantlay |
| 2 1/2 | Session | 1 1/2 |
| 5 1/2 | Overall | 2 1/2 |

=== Saturday's matches ===
==== Morning foursomes ====
The foursomes matches for Saturday were announced Friday night after the completion of day one. In the first overall match, Matt Fitzpatrick and Ludvig Åberg lost 4 and 2 to Bryson DeChambeau and Cameron Young, reducing Europe's lead to 5 1/2–3 1/2. In the second overall match, Rory McIlroy and Tommy Fleetwood won 3 and 2 against Harris English and Collin Morikawa, increasing Europe's lead to 6 1/2–3 1/2. In the third overall match, Jon Rahm and Tyrrell Hatton won 3 and 2 against Xander Schauffele and Patrick Cantlay, pushing Europe's lead to 7 1/2–3 1/2. In the final match, Robert MacIntyre and Viktor Hovland won 1-up against Russell Henley and Scottie Scheffler, increasing Europe's advantage to 8 1/2–3 1/2 heading into the afternoon four-ball session.

| | Results |
|---|---|---|
| Fitzpatrick/Åberg | (United States) 4 & 2 | DeChambeau/Young |
| McIlroy/Fleetwood | (Europe) 3 & 2 | English/Morikawa |
| Rahm/Hatton | (Europe) 3 & 2 | Schauffele/Cantlay |
| MacIntyre/Hovland | (Europe) 1 up | Henley/Scheffler |
| 3 | Session | 1 |
| 8 1/2 | Overall | 3 1/2 |

==== Afternoon four-ball ====
The four-ball matches for Saturday were announced after the completion of the morning foursomes. In the first match, Rory McIlroy and Shane Lowry took on Justin Thomas and Cameron Young. McIlroy and Lowry were 2-up after winning both the 4th and 5th holes respectively, before Thomas and Young won the 7th and 9th holes to make it all square leading into back nine. On the 14th, McIlroy and Lowry took a 1-up lead before winning the 18th hole to win 2-up. In the second match, Tommy Fleetwood and Justin Rose faced Scottie Scheffler and Bryson DeChambeau. Fleetwood and Rose would win the 3rd hole before Scheffler and DeChambeau would win both the 4th and 5th. Fleetwood and Rose then won the 7th and 8th to lead 1-up going into the last nine holes. Winning the 10th hole gave Fleetwood and Rose a 2-up lead, before Scheffler and DeChambeau would win the 11th hole. Fleetwood and Rose would win both the 12th and 14th, and with the rest of the holes being tied, Fleetwood and Rose won 3 and 2. In the third match, J. J. Spaun and Xander Schauffele won the Americans' only point of the afternoon, winning against Jon Rahm and Sepp Straka. After being 1-down going into the 17th hole, they ended up winning both of the last two holes to win the match 1-up. For the final match of the day, Tyrrell Hatton, replacing an injured Viktor Hovland, and Matt Fitzpatrick faced off against Sam Burns and Patrick Cantlay. Being tied going into the 18th hole, Europe won the hole, winning 1-up.

Team Europe took a 11 1/2–4 1/2 lead heading into Sunday singles: the highest lead on any side in Ryder Cup history since Europe's introduction in 1979.

| | Results |
|---|---|---|
| McIlroy/Lowry | (Europe) 2 up | Thomas/Young |
| Fleetwood/Rose | (Europe) 3 & 2 | Scheffler/DeChambeau |
| Rahm/Straka | (United States) 1 up | Spaun/Schauffele |
| Hatton/Fitzpatrick | (Europe) 1 up | Burns/Cantlay |
| 3 | Session | 1 |
| 11 1/2 | Overall | 4 1/2 |

=== Sunday's singles matches ===
Sunday pairings were announced at the conclusion of day 2. Viktor Hovland withdrew from his match against Harris English before the start of play due to a neck injury, resulting in his match not being played and halved, giving both teams a 1/2 point. The overall score moving to a European lead of 12–5.

The day saw many Europeans leading early but their leads disappearing with the US Team making comebacks. In the first match, Cameron Young birdied the 18th hole to defeat Justin Rose 1 up and give the American team its first full point on singles, with Europe still leading 12–6. In the second match, Justin Thomas also birdied the 18th hole defeating Tommy Fleetwood 1-up, to give American their 2nd full point, with Europe still leading 12–7. In the sixth match Xander Schauffele defeated Jon Rahm 4 and 3 to cut the European lead down to 12–8. Europe would win their first and only full point of the session when Ludvig Åberg defeated Patrick Cantlay 2 and 1, putting Europe 1 point away from retaining the Ryder cup at 13–8. The third match was halved by Bryson DeChambeau and Matt Fitzpatrick, with DeChambeau making an improbable comeback despite being 5 down after 7, leaving Europe with a 13 1/2–8 1/2 lead. The fourth match featured the world number one Scottie Scheffler against world number two Rory McIlroy, with Scheffler defeating McIlroy 1-up. This was the first time the top two players in the world rankings had faced each other in a Ryder Cup singles match. Scheffler's win narrowed Europe's lead to 13 1/2–9 1/2. In the seventh match J. J. Spaun defeated Sepp Straka 2 and 1, cutting the European lead to 13 1/2–10 1/2.

Europe retained the cup when Shane Lowry birdied the 18th hole to halve his match against Russell Henley, making the score 14–11. Ben Griffin won the ninth match 1-up over Rasmus Højgaard with Europe holding a 14–12 lead. In the tenth match, Tyrrell Hatton and Collin Morikawa halved the match, ensuring that Europe would win the Ryder Cup, while in the final match Robert Macintyre and Sam Burns also halved, making the final score 15–13.

| | Results | | Timetable |
|---|---|---|---|
| Justin Rose | (United States) 1 up | Cameron Young | 2nd: 12–6 |
| Tommy Fleetwood | (United States) 1 up | Justin Thomas | 3rd: 12–7 |
| Matt Fitzpatrick | halved | Bryson DeChambeau | 6th: 13 1/2–8 1/2 |
| Rory McIlroy | (United States) 1 up | Scottie Scheffler | 7th: 13 1/2–9 1/2 |
| Ludvig Åberg | (Europe) 2 & 1 | Patrick Cantlay | 5th: 13–8 |
| Jon Rahm | (United States) 4 & 3 | Xander Schauffele | 4th: 12–8 |
| Sepp Straka | (United States) 2 & 1 | J. J. Spaun | 8th: 13 1/2–10 1/2 |
| Shane Lowry | halved | Russell Henley | 9th: 14–11 |
| Rasmus Højgaard | (United States) 1 up | Ben Griffin | 10th: 14–12 |
| Tyrrell Hatton | halved | Collin Morikawa | 11th: 14 1/2–12 1/2 |
| Robert MacIntyre | halved | Sam Burns | 12th: 15–13 |
| Viktor Hovland† | halved | Harris English | 1st: 12–5 |
| 3 1/2 | Session | 8 1/2 |
| 15 | Overall | 13 |

Note: † Viktor Hovland withdrew due to a neck injury.

=== Crowd conduct ===
Europe faced a crowd described as "jingoistic", "hostile" and "unruly". Golf Magazine and Golf Monthly both stated that fans had "crossed the line" of acceptable behaviour. McIlroy was subjected to "lewd, obnoxious and insulting taunts", with MC Heather McMahan removed from the event on Saturday after joining in with an explicit chant sung by the crowd. The taunts at one point led McIlroy to unleash his own response by flipping off the crowd and repeatedly yelling "f-bombs" at offenders.

Organisers did note that no arrests were made, but that some fans had been removed from the event. Keegan Bradley—captain of the United States team—defended the crowd, calling them "passionate", and rejected suggestions by media that the team had provoked the crowd.

Following the event, McIlroy called the crowds "unacceptable", noting that his wife had been hit by a beer on Saturday and that "golf should be held to a higher standard than [this]". Media criticised the American crowds, with Sky News calling it "the most abusive Ryder Cup in almost a century of matches", The Guardian calling it a "reflection of Trump's all-caps America", and Golf Magazine stating that crowds were "more nuanced than an angry mob, but not by much". The crowd's behavior was compared to that of the 1999 Ryder Cup in Brookline, Massachusetts, where Colin Montgomerie and his wife received abuse. On that occasion, Montgomerie's opponent Payne Stewart intervened on his behalf and had police remove some of the offenders from the crowd.

== Individual player records ==
Each entry refers to the win–loss–tie record of the player.

=== Europe ===
| Player | Points | Matches | Overall | Singles | Foursomes | Fourballs |
|---|---|---|---|---|---|---|
| Ludvig Åberg | 2 | 4 | 2–2–0 | 1–0–0 | 1–1–0 | 0–1–0 |
| Matt Fitzpatrick | 2.5 | 4 | 2–1–1 | 0–0–1 | 1–1–0 | 1–0–0 |
| Tommy Fleetwood | 4 | 5 | 4–1–0 | 0–1–0 | 2–0–0 | 2–0–0 |
| Tyrrell Hatton | 3.5 | 4 | 3–0–1 | 0–0–1 | 2–0–0 | 1–0–0 |
| Rasmus Højgaard | 0 | 2 | 0–2–0 | 0–1–0 | 0–0–0 | 0–1–0 |
| Viktor Hovland | 1.5 | 3† | 1–1–1 | 0–0–1 | 1–1–0 | 0–0–0 |
| Shane Lowry | 2 | 3 | 1–0–2 | 0–0–1 | 0–0–0 | 1–0–1 |
| Robert MacIntyre | 1.5 | 3 | 1–1–1 | 0–0–1 | 1–1–0 | 0–0–0 |
| Rory McIlroy | 3.5 | 5 | 3–1–1 | 0–1–0 | 2–0–0 | 1–0–1 |
| Jon Rahm | 3 | 5 | 3–2–0 | 0–1–0 | 2–0–0 | 1–1–0 |
| Justin Rose | 2 | 3 | 2–1–0 | 0–1–0 | 0–0–0 | 2–0–0 |
| Sepp Straka | 1 | 3 | 1–2–0 | 0–1–0 | 0–0–0 | 1–1–0 |

=== United States ===
| Player | Points | Matches | Overall | Singles | Foursomes | Fourballs |
|---|---|---|---|---|---|---|
| Sam Burns | 1 | 3 | 0–1–2 | 0–0–1 | 0–0–0 | 0–1–1 |
| Patrick Cantlay | 1.5 | 5 | 1–3–1 | 0–1–0 | 1–1–0 | 0–1–1 |
| Bryson DeChambeau | 1.5 | 5 | 1–3–1 | 0–0–1 | 1–1–0 | 0–2–0 |
| Harris English | 0.5 | 3† | 0–2–1 | 0–0–1 | 0–2–0 | 0–0–0 |
| Ben Griffin | 1 | 2 | 1–1–0 | 1–0–0 | 0–0–0 | 0–1–0 |
| Russell Henley | 0.5 | 3 | 0–2–1 | 0–0–1 | 0–2–0 | 0–0–0 |
| Collin Morikawa | 0.5 | 3 | 0–2–1 | 0–0–1 | 0–2–0 | 0–0–0 |
| Xander Schauffele | 3 | 4 | 3–1–0 | 1–0–0 | 1–1–0 | 1–0–0 |
| Scottie Scheffler | 1 | 5 | 1–4–0 | 1–0–0 | 0–2–0 | 0–2–0 |
| J. J. Spaun | 2 | 3 | 2–1–0 | 1–0–0 | 0–0–0 | 1–1–0 |
| Justin Thomas | 2 | 4 | 2–2–0 | 1–0–0 | 0–1–0 | 1–1–0 |
| Cameron Young | 3 | 4 | 3–1–0 | 1–0–0 | 1–0–0 | 1–1–0 |

Note: † Viktor Hovland withdrew due to a neck injury. The match was not played, resulting in a halved match and 1/2 point for Hovland and Harris English

== Broadcast ==
The 2025 Ryder Cup was televised in the United States by USA Network, Golf Channel, NBC, NBC streaming site Peacock, the Ryder Cup's YouTube page and had radio coverage on SiriusXM Radio. In the United Kingdom and Ireland, the event was broadcast by Sky Sports and streamed on Sky Go, with radio coverage on BBC Radio 5 Live.
