= Matt Harmon =

American professional golfer (born 1985)

Personal information
- Nationality: United States
- Born: April 4, 1985 (age 41) Grand Haven, Michigan, U.S.
- Height: 6 ft 1 in (1.85 m)
- Weight: 180 lb (82 kg; 13 st)

Career
- Sport: Golf
- College: Michigan State University
- Turned professional: 2007
- Former tours: Web.com Tour; PGA Tour Canada; NGA Hooters Tour
- Professional wins: 5

Best results in major championships
- Masters Tournament: DNP
- PGA Championship: DNP
- U.S. Open: CUT: 2013
- The Open Championship: DNP

Matt Harmon (born April 4, 1985) is an American professional golfer.

== Career ==
In 1985, Harmon is from Grand Rapids, Michigan. He attended Michigan State University and was the 2007 Big Ten Conference "Player of the Year" for men's golf.

He has competed in the 2007, 2008, and 2009 PGA Tour's Buick Invitational. His best finish came in 2009 where he finished tied for 52nd place.

He has also competed in the PGA's developmental Nationwide Tour and the NGA Hooters Tour. He has a total of 4 professional wins on the NGA Hooters Tour.

Harmon qualified for the 2013 U.S. Open at Merion Golf Club. Harmon won the 2014 SIGA Dakota Dunes Open. He finished second on the PGA Tour Canada Order of Merit to earn a Web.com Tour card for 2015.

== Awards and honors ==
- Harmon earned All-Big honors three-times while at Michigan State University.
- In 2007, Harmon was the Big Ten coaches' unanimous selection for the Big Ten Conference "Player of the Year" in men's golf.

== Professional wins (5) ==
=== PGA Tour Canada wins (1) ===
No.	Date	Tournament	Winning score	Margin of victory	Runner-up
1	Jul 6, 2014	SIGA Dakota Dunes Open	−24 (65-70-63-66=264)	3 strokes	(United States) William Kropp

=== NGA Hooters Tour wins (4) ===
- 2010 Buffalo Run Casino Classic
- three other wins
