= Harry Hall (golfer) =

English professional golfer (born 1997)

Personal information
- Full name: Harry Philip Bowden Hall
- Nationality: England
- Born: 6 August 1997 (age 29) Camborne, England
- Height: 6 ft 4 in (193 cm)
- Weight: 225 lb (102 kg)

Career
- Sport: Golf
- College: University of Nevada-Las Vegas
- Turned professional: 2019
- Current tours: PGA Tour; European Tour
- Former tour: Korn Ferry Tour
- Professional wins: 3
- Highest ranking: 49 (14 September 2025) (as of 25 October 2026)

Number of wins by tour
- PGA Tour: 1
- European Tour: 1
- Korn Ferry Tour: 2

Best results in major championships
- Masters Tournament: CUT: 2026
- PGA Championship: T19: 2025
- U.S. Open: CUT: 2022, 2026
- The Open Championship: T28: 2025

Harry Philip Bowden Hall (born 6 August 1997) is an English professional golfer who currently plays on the PGA Tour.

== Amateur career ==
Hall attended the University of Nevada-Las Vegas from 2015 to 2019.

== Professional career ==
Hall turned professional in 2019. He played on the Korn Ferry Tour from 2020 to 2022. He won twice on the Korn Ferry Tour; at the 2021 Wichita Open and the 2022 NV5 Invitational. He gained a PGA Tour card for the 2022–23 season via the Korn Ferry Tour regular season. He won his first PGA Tour title at the 2024 ISCO Championship in July.

== Amateur wins ==
- 2014 Cornwall Amateur Championship, Welsh Open Youths Championship
- 2018 William H. Tucker, Little Rock First Tee Classic

== Professional wins (3) ==
=== PGA Tour wins (1) ===
No.	Date	Tournament	Winning score	Margin of victory	Runners-up
1	14 Jul 2024	ISCO Championship^{1}	−22 (66-67-64-69=266)	Playoff	(United States) Zac Blair, (United States) Pierceson Coody, (Philippines) Rico Hoey, (United States) Matthew NeSmith

^{1}Co-sanctioned by the European Tour

PGA Tour playoff record (1–0)

No.	Year	Tournament	Opponents	Result
1	2024	ISCO Championship	(United States) Zac Blair, (United States) Pierceson Coody, (Philippines) Rico Hoey, (United States) Matthew NeSmith	Won with birdie on third extra hole Blair and Hoey eliminated by par on first hole

=== European Tour wins (1) ===
No.	Date	Tournament	Winning score	Margin of victory	Runners-up
1	14 Jul 2024	ISCO Championship^{1}	−22 (66-67-64-69=266)	Playoff	(United States) Zac Blair, (United States) Pierceson Coody, (Philippines) Rico Hoey, (United States) Matthew NeSmith

^{1}Co-sanctioned by the PGA Tour

European Tour playoff record (1–0)

No.	Year	Tournament	Opponents	Result
1	2024	ISCO Championship	(United States) Zac Blair, (United States) Pierceson Coody, (Philippines) Rico Hoey, (United States) Matthew NeSmith	Won with birdie on third extra hole Blair and Hoey eliminated by par on first hole

=== Korn Ferry Tour wins (2) ===
No.	Date	Tournament	Winning score	Margin of victory	Runner-up
1	20 Jun 2021	Wichita Open	−20 (64-63-66-67=260)	1 stroke	(United States) Curtis Thompson
2	29 May 2022	NV5 Invitational	−22 (65-67-65-65=262)	Playoff	(United States) Nick Hardy

Korn Ferry Tour playoff record (1–0)

No.	Year	Tournament	Opponent	Result
1	2022	NV5 Invitational	(United States) Nick Hardy	Won with birdie on third extra hole

== Results in major championships ==
Tournament	2022	2023	2024	2025	2026
Masters Tournament					CUT
PGA Championship				T19	CUT
U.S. Open	CUT				CUT
The Open Championship				T28	CUT

Did not play

CUT = missed the half-way cut
"T" = tied

== Results in The Players Championship ==
Tournament	2025	2026
The Players Championship	CUT	CUT

CUT = missed the half-way cut

== Team appearances ==
Amateur

- European Boys' Team Championship (representing England): 2014
- Arnold Palmer Cup (representing Europe): 2017, 2018
- Walker Cup (representing Great Britain & Ireland): 2019
- European Amateur Team Championship (representing England): 2019
