= Jake Knapp =

American professional golfer (born 1994)

Personal information
- Full name: Jacob Richard Knapp
- Nationality: United States
- Born: May 31, 1994 (age 32) Costa Mesa, California, U.S.
- Height: 5 ft 11 in (180 cm)
- Weight: 190 lb (86 kg)

Career
- Sport: Golf
- College: UCLA
- Turned professional: 2016
- Current tour: PGA Tour
- Former tours: Korn Ferry Tour; PGA Tour Canada
- Professional wins: 5
- Highest ranking: 36 (April 12, 2026) (as of October 25, 2026)

Number of wins by tour
- PGA Tour: 1
- Other: 4

Best results in major championships
- Masters Tournament: 11th: 2026
- PGA Championship: CUT: 2024, 2025
- U.S. Open: CUT: 2015, 2024, 2026
- The Open Championship: CUT: 2026

Jacob Richard Knapp (born May 31, 1994) is an American professional golfer competing on the PGA Tour.

== Early life ==
Knapp was born on May 31, 1994, in Costa Mesa, California to Jennifer and Robert Knapp. His older brother, Ryan, was a golfer at Orange Coast College and the University of California, Irvine. He played for Estancia High School. He qualified for the 2015 U.S. Open as an amateur.

== Professional career ==
Knapp turned professional in 2016. He played on PGA Tour Canada from 2016 to 2019 and again in 2022, winning three times. He played on the Korn Ferry Tour in 2020, 2021, and 2023. He earned his 2024 PGA Tour card by finishing 13th on the Korn Ferry Tour points list in 2023.

In February 2024, Knapp won the Mexican Open for his first PGA Tour victory. Knapp hit just two fairways in the final round, becoming the first PGA Tour player since 1983 to hit two or fewer fairways in his final round and win.

At the Cognizant Classic in February 2025, Knapp shot a 59 in the first round, which was just the 15th sub-60 round in PGA Tour history.

During the 2026 PGA Tour season, Knapp finished in the top-10 six times, a career-high. He also placed 11th at 2026 Masters Tournament. It was also his career high season in total earnings at $3,974,296, despite undergoing thumb surgery.

== Personal life ==
Knapp worked as a bouncer after losing his full time status on the Korn Ferry Tour.

On September 26, 2025, Knapp's girlfriend Makena White died.

== Professional wins (5) ==
=== PGA Tour wins (1) ===
No.	Date	Tournament	Winning score	To par	Margin of victory	Runner-up
1	Feb 25, 2024	Mexico Open	67-64-63-71=265	−19	2 strokes	(Finland) Sami Välimäki

=== PGA Tour Canada wins (3) ===
No.	Date	Tournament	Winning score	To par	Margin of victory	Runner(s)-up
1	May 26, 2019	Canada Life Open	65-68-70-64=267	−21	2 strokes	(Canada) James Allenby, (United States) Brian Carlson
2	Jun 16, 2019	GolfBC Championship	64-67-70-63=264	−20	1 stroke	(United States) Jonathan Garrick
3	Aug 28, 2022	CRMC Championship	64-65-61-64=254	−26	2 strokes	(Canada) Wil Bateman

=== Other wins (1) ===
No.	Date	Tournament	Winning score	To par	Margin of victory	Runners-up
1	Dec 15, 2024	Grant Thornton Invitational (with (Thailand) Patty Tavatanakit)	58-66-65=189	−27	1 stroke	(South Korea) Tom Kim and (Thailand) Atthaya Thitikul

== Results in major championships ==
Tournament	2024	2025	2026
Masters Tournament	T55		11
PGA Championship	CUT	CUT	
U.S. Open	CUT		CUT
The Open Championship			CUT

Did not play

CUT = missed the half-way cut
"T" = tied

=== Summary ===
Tournament	Wins	2nd	3rd	Top-5	Top-10	Top-25	Events	Cuts made
Masters Tournament	0	0	0	0	0	1	2	2
PGA Championship	0	0	0	0	0	0	2	0
U.S. Open	0	0	0	0	0	0	2	0
The Open Championship	0	0	0	0	0	0	1	0
Totals	0	0	0	0	0	1	7	2

== Results in The Players Championship ==
Tournament	2025	2026
The Players Championship	T12	CUT

CUT = missed the half-way cut
"T" = tied

== See also ==
- 2023 Korn Ferry Tour graduates
