= Rico Hoey =

American–Filipino professional golfer (born 1995)

Personal information
- Full name: Richard Hoey
- Nationality: United States (until 2023); Philippines (2024–)
- Born: 19 September 1995 (age 31) Manila, Philippines
- Height: 5 ft 10 in (178 cm)
- Weight: 205 lb (93 kg)

Career
- Sport: Golf
- College: University of Southern California
- Turned professional: 2017
- Current tour: PGA Tour
- Former tours: Korn Ferry Tour; PGA Tour Canada
- Professional wins: 2
- Highest ranking: 69 (21 December 2025) (as of 15 November 2026)

Number of wins by tour
- Korn Ferry Tour: 1
- Other: 1

Best results in major championships
- Masters Tournament: DNP
- PGA Championship: T60: 2026
- U.S. Open: CUT: 2024
- The Open Championship: DNP

Richard Hoey (born 19 September 1995) is an American-Filipino professional golfer who plays on the PGA Tour.

== Early life and amateur career ==
Hoey was born in Manila, Philippines and moved to Rancho Cucamonga, California at a young age. He attended college at the University of Southern California from 2014 to 2017.

== Professional career ==
Hoey turned professional in 2017 and began playing on PGA Tour Canada. He won the season ending event; the Freedom 55 Financial Championship, finishing fifth on the Order of Merit, earning status to play on the 2018 Web.com Tour.

In 2023, Hoey claimed his first Korn Ferry Tour victory at the Visit Knoxville Open. He finished the season fourth on the points list; earning status to play on the 2024 PGA Tour. Hoey played as an American until 2024, when he switched his representation to his birth country of the Philippines. Hoey was ineligible for the 2024 Olympics because the change in representation occurred less than two years before the Olympics.

== Amateur wins ==
- 2012 Callaway Junior World Championship
- 2016 SCGA Amateur Championship

== Professional wins (2) ==
=== Korn Ferry Tour wins (1) ===
| No. | Date | Tournament | Winning score | Margin of victory | Runners-up |
|---|---|---|---|---|---|
| 1 | 28 May 2023 | Visit Knoxville Open | −14 (64-71-66-65=266) | 1 stroke | (United States) Chase Seiffert, (United States) Norman Xiong |

=== PGA Tour Canada wins (1) ===
| No. | Date | Tournament | Winning score | Margin of victory | Runner-up |
|---|---|---|---|---|---|
| 1 | 17 Sep 2017 | Freedom 55 Financial Championship | −19 (66-66-62-67=261) | 1 stroke | (United States) Jordan Niebrugge |

== Playoff record ==
PGA Tour playoff record (0–1)

| No. | Year | Tournament | Opponents | Result |
|---|---|---|---|---|
| 1 | 2024 | ISCO Championship | (United States) Zac Blair, (United States) Pierceson Coody, (England) Harry Hall, (United States) Matthew NeSmith | Hall won with birdie on third extra hole Blair and Hoey eliminated by par on first hole |

== Results in major championships ==
| Tournament | 2024 | 2025 | 2026 |
|---|---|---|---|
| Masters Tournament | | | |
| PGA Championship | | CUT | T60 |
| U.S. Open | CUT | | |
| The Open Championship | | | |

Did not play

CUT = missed the half-way cut
"T" indicates a tie for a place

== Results in The Players Championship ==
| Tournament | 2025 | 2026 |
|---|---|---|
| The Players Championship | T33 | T62 |

"T" = tied

== Team appearances ==
Amateur

- Arnold Palmer Cup (representing the United States): 2014, 2016

Professional

- Aruba Cup (representing PGA Tour Canada): 2017 (winners)

== See also ==
- 2023 Korn Ferry Tour graduates
