= Fortinet Cup Championship =

Tournament information
- Location: London, Ontario
- Established: 2002
- Course: Highland Country Club
- Par: 72
- Tour: PGA Tour Americas
- Format: Stroke play
- Prize fund: C$225,000
- Month played: September

Current champion
- (United States) Hayden Springer

The Fortinet Cup Championship is an annual professional golf tournament played in Canada. It is the season ending event on the PGA Tour Americas, having previously served the same function on the PGA Tour Canada, commonly known as the Canadian Tour. The PGA Tour Americas replaced the PGA Tour Canada and the PGA Tour Latinoamérica in 2024.

The tournament was founded in 2002 as the Bay Mills Open, hosted at the Bay Mills Resort in Brimley, Michigan, United States, and became designated as the Canadian Tour's "Players Championship" the following year. In 2006, the tournament moved to Ontario, Canada as the new Canadian Tour Championship. It has since remained in Ontario, and adopted different names under various title sponsors.

In 2015, it was an event reserved for those in the top 60 on the PGA Tour Canada money list. The top five players on the money list after the tournament were given what later became Korn Ferry Tour cards while the remaining players remained exempt on PGA Tour Canada. In 2024, after the tournament became part of PGA Tour Americas, the tournament was open to the top 120 players in the Fortinet Cup standings, awarding ten Korn Ferry Tour cards with those up to 80th retaining PGA Tour Americas status.

During the COVID-19 pandemic and travel restrictions into Canada, the PGA Tour organised substitute tours in the United States that served as the replacement tours for PGA Tour Canada. The 2020 substitute was known as the LocaliQ Series Championship in Duluth, Georgia. The 2021 substitute, the Forme Tour Championship, was held in Huntsville Golf Club in Dallas, Pennsylvania. Both served as the PGA Tour's official substitutes.

== Winners ==
Fortinet Cup Championship

- 2023 (United States) Hayden Springer
- 2022 (Canada) Wil Bateman

Forme Tour Championship

- 2021 (United States) Brad Miller

LocaliQ Series Championship

- 2020 (United States) David Pastore

Canada Life Championship

- 2019 (United States) Patrick Fishburn

Freedom 55 Financial Championship

- 2018 (United States) Danny Walker
- 2017 (United States) Rico Hoey
- 2016 (France) Paul Barjon
- 2015 (United States) Jason Millard

Tour Championship of Canada

- 2014 (Canada) Ryan Williams
- 2013 (Canada) Max Gilbert

Canadian Tour Championship

- 2012 (Canada) Eugene Wong
- 2011 (Canada) Stuart Anderson
- 2010 (United States) Aaron Goldberg
- 2009 (Canada) James Love
- 2008 (United States) Tom Stankowski
- 2007 (United States) Bret Guetz
- 2006 (Canada) Stuart Anderson

Bay Mills Open Players Championship

- 2005 (United States) Michael Harris
- 2004 (United States) Chris Wisler
- 2003 (United States) Rodney Butcher

Bay Mills Open

- 2002 (United States) Jeff Quinney
