= Sam Ryder (golfer) =

American professional golfer (born 1989)

Personal information
- Full name: Samuel Richard Ryder
- Nationality: United States
- Born: December 15, 1989 (age 36) Winter Park, Florida, U.S.
- Height: 6 ft 2 in (1.88 m)
- Weight: 175 lb (79 kg; 12.5 st)

Career
- Sport: Golf
- College: Stetson University
- Turned professional: 2012
- Current tour: PGA Tour
- Former tours: PGA Tour Canada; Web.com Tour
- Professional wins: 2
- Highest ranking: 100 (March 24, 2024) (as of October 25, 2026)

Number of wins by tour
- Korn Ferry Tour: 1
- Other: 1

Best results in major championships
- Masters Tournament: DNP
- PGA Championship: CUT: 2023
- U.S. Open: CUT: 2017, 2021
- The Open Championship: DNP

Samuel Richard Ryder (born December 15, 1989) is an American professional golfer who plays on the PGA Tour. Ryder was born in Winter Park, Florida, and attended Stetson University, where he studied finance.

== Professional career ==
Ryder played on the PGA Tour Canada in 2014 and 2015. In 2015 he finished fourth in the PGA Tour Canada Order of Merit earning a place on the Web.com Tour for 2016.

In July 2017, Ryder had his first Web.com win, the Pinnacle Bank Championship, finishing 8 strokes ahead of the field. He finished second in the 2017 Web.com Tour regular season rankings to gain a place on the PGA Tour for 2018.

In 2019, Ryder qualified for the FedExCup Playoffs for the second time, finishing number 107 in the standings. Placed third in the Shriners Hospitals for Children Open and a tie for fourth in the Safeway Open.

In 2020, Ryder again qualified for the FedExCup Playoffs for a third time, this time finishing number 108 in the standings. Tied for third in the Puerto Rico Open.

In 2022, Ryder became the 10th Phoenix Open participant to make a hole-in-one on the 16th hole of TPC Scottsdale.

== Professional wins (2) ==
=== Web.com Tour wins (1) ===
No.	Date	Tournament	Winning score	Margin of victory	Runners-up
1	Jul 23, 2017	Pinnacle Bank Championship	−21 (67-67-62-67=263)	8 strokes	(United States) Scott Gutschewski, (United States) Scott Harrington, (United States) Michael Johnson, (United States) Andrew Landry

=== PGA Tour Canada wins (1) ===
No.	Date	Tournament	Winning score	Margin of victory	Runner-up
1	Aug 23, 2015	National Capital Open to Support Our Troops	−20 (69-65-64-66=264)	Playoff	(Canada) Taylor Pendrith

== Results in major championships ==
Results not in chronological order in 2020.

Tournament	2017	2018
Masters Tournament		
U.S. Open	CUT	
The Open Championship		
PGA Championship		

Tournament	2019	2020	2021	2022	2023
Masters Tournament					
PGA Championship					CUT
U.S. Open			CUT		
The Open Championship		NT			

Did not play

CUT = missed the halfway cut
NT = No tournament due to COVID-19 pandemic

== Results in The Players Championship ==
Tournament	2019	2020	2021	2022	2023	2024	2025
The Players Championship	CUT	C	CUT	T60	T44	T16	T14

CUT = missed the halfway cut
"T" indicates a tie for a place.
C = Canceled after the first round due to the COVID-19 pandemic

== See also ==
- 2017 Web.com Tour Finals graduates
