= 2019 Players Championship =

- Official Poster of the 2019 Players Championship

Tournament information
- Dates: March 14–17, 2019
- Location: Ponte Vedra Beach, Florida; 30.198°N 81.394°W
- Courses: TPC Sawgrass, Stadium Course
- Tour: PGA Tour

Statistics
- Par: 72
- Length: 7,189 yards (6,574 m)
- Field: 144 players, 80 after cut 73 after second cut
- Cut: 143 (−1)
- Prize fund: $12.5 million
- Winner's share: $2.25 million

Champion
- (Northern Ireland) Rory McIlroy
- 272 (−16)

Location map
- Location in the United States Location in Florida

The 2019 Players Championship was the 46th Players Championship and was played March 14–17 at TPC Sawgrass in Ponte Vedra Beach, Florida. It was the 38th edition held at the Stadium Course and the first in March in thirteen years.

On January 28, 2019, it was announced the 2019 Players Championship would have a $12.5 million purse, "the biggest prize professional golf has ever seen for a single tournament." It was a 13 percent increase from the 2018 Championship.

Rory McIlroy shot a two-under 70 in the final round for 272 (−16) to win his first Players, one stroke ahead of runner-up Jim Furyk. Defending champion Webb Simpson finished six strokes back, tied for 16th place.

== Venue ==
=== Course layout ===
The 2019 Players Championship
Tee	Rating/Slope	1	2	3	4	5	6	7	8	9	Out	10	11	12	13	14	15	16	17	18	In	Total
Yards	76.4 / 155	423	532	177	384	471	393	451	237	583	3,651	424	558	302	181	481	470	523	137	462	3,538	7,189
Par		4	5	3	4	4	4	4	3	5	36	4	5	4	3	4	4	5	3	4	36	72

== Field ==
The field consisted of 144 players meeting the following criteria:

1. Winners of PGA Tour events since last Players

Keegan Bradley (2,9), Cameron Champ, Bryson DeChambeau (2,8,9), Rickie Fowler (2,5,9,13), J. B. Holmes (2,9), Charles Howell III (2,9,13), Dustin Johnson (2,4,7,9,13), Michael Kim (2), Brooks Koepka (2,4,9,13), Matt Kuchar (2,9,13), Marc Leishman (2,8,9,13), Adam Long, Troy Merritt (2), Phil Mickelson (2,7,9,13), Keith Mitchell (2), Francesco Molinari (2,4,8,9), Kevin Na (2), Andrew Putnam (2,9), Justin Rose (2,7,9), Xander Schauffele (2,6,7,9,13), Webb Simpson (2,5,9), Brandt Snedeker (2), Martin Trainer, Justin Thomas (2,4,7,9,13), Kevin Tway (2), Bubba Watson (2,4,7,9), Aaron Wise (2), Tiger Woods (2,6,9)

2. Top 125 from previous season's FedEx Cup points list

An Byeong-hun, Abraham Ancer, Ryan Armour, Daniel Berger, Ryan Blaum, Scott Brown, Bronson Burgoon, Rafa Cabrera-Bello (9), Patrick Cantlay (9), Bud Cauley, Paul Casey (9), Alex Čejka, Stewart Cink, Austin Cook, Joel Dahmen, Jason Day (4,5,7,9), Jason Dufner (8), Tyler Duncan, Harris English, Tony Finau (9), Tommy Fleetwood (9), Brice Garnett, Brian Gay, Branden Grace (9), Emiliano Grillo, Chesson Hadley, Adam Hadwin, Brandon Harkins, Tyrrell Hatton (9), Brian Harman, Russell Henley, Charley Hoffman, Tom Hoge, Billy Horschel (9), Beau Hossler, John Huh, Zach Johnson (4), Kang Sung-hoon, Kim Si-woo (5), Chris Kirk, Kevin Kisner (9), Patton Kizzire, Russell Knox, Satoshi Kodaira, Jason Kokrak, Kelly Kraft, Anirban Lahiri, Martin Laird, Andrew Landry, Danny Lee, Luke List, Hideki Matsuyama (7,9), Rory McIlroy (4,6,8,9), Ryan Moore, Trey Mullinax, Grayson Murray, Alex Norén (9), Louis Oosthuizen (9), Ryan Palmer, Pan Cheng-tsung, Scott Piercy, J. T. Poston, Ted Potter Jr., Ian Poulter (9), Séamus Power, Jon Rahm (9), Chez Reavie, Patrick Reed (4,9), Patrick Rodgers, Sam Ryder, Rory Sabbatini, Sam Saunders, Ollie Schniederjans, Charl Schwartzel, Adam Scott (9), Cameron Smith (9), J. J. Spaun, Jordan Spieth (4,9), Scott Stallings, Kyle Stanley (9), Brendan Steele, Henrik Stenson (4,9), Kevin Streelman, Brian Stuard, Nick Taylor, Vaughn Taylor, Peter Uihlein, Harold Varner III, Jhonattan Vegas, Jimmy Walker (4), Nick Watney, Richy Werenski, Gary Woodland (9,13)

- Kevin Chappell, James Hahn, Kim Meen-whee, Jamie Lovemark, William McGirt (8), Sean O'Hair, and Pat Perez did not play

3. Top 125 (medical)

Lucas Glover

4. Major champions from the past five years

Sergio García (9), Martin Kaymer (5), Danny Willett

5. Players Championship winners from the past five years

6. The Tour Championship winners from the past three years

7. World Golf Championship winners from the past three years

8. Memorial Tournament and Arnold Palmer Invitational winners from the past three years

9. Top 50 from the Official World Golf Ranking

Kiradech Aphibarnrat, Lucas Bjerregaard, Matt Fitzpatrick, Li Haotong, Shane Lowry, Thorbjørn Olesen, Eddie Pepperell, Matt Wallace

10. Senior Players champion from prior year

Vijay Singh

11. Web.com Tour money leader from prior season

Im Sung-jae

12. Money leader during the Web.com Tour Finals

Denny McCarthy

13. Top 10 current year FedEx Cup points leaders

14. Remaining positions and alternates filled through current year FedEx Cup standings

- Michael Thompson (41)
- Talor Gooch (43)
- Corey Conners (50)
- Aaron Baddeley (61)
- Scott Langley (62)
- Jim Furyk (64)
- Dominic Bozzelli (65)
- Wyndham Clark (72)

== Round summaries ==
=== First round ===
Thursday, March 14, 2019

Keegan Bradley and Tommy Fleetwood shot 7-under-par rounds of 65 to share the lead by one stroke over An Byeong-hun and Brian Harman. Harris English scored an albatross on the par-5 11th hole, the third albatross in as many years at TPC Sawgrass.

Place	Player	Score	To par
T1	(United States) Keegan Bradley	65	−7
T1	(England) Tommy Fleetwood	65	−7
T3	(South Korea) An Byeong-hun	66	−6
T3	(United States) Brian Harman	66	−6
T5	(Northern Ireland) Rory McIlroy	67	−5
T5	(United States) Ryan Moore	67	−5
T5	(United States) Vaughn Taylor	67	−5
T8	(United States) Kevin Kisner	68	−4
T8	(United States) J. T. Poston	68	−4
T8	(Slovakia) Rory Sabbatini	68	−4
T8	(United States) Kyle Stanley	68	−4
T8	(United States) Brendan Steele	68	−4

=== Second round ===
Friday, March 15, 2019

Place	Player	Score	To par
T1	(England) Tommy Fleetwood	65-67=132	−12
T1	(Northern Ireland) Rory McIlroy	67-65=132	−12
T3	(Mexico) Abraham Ancer	69-66=135	−9
T3	(United States) Jim Furyk	71-64=135	−9
T3	(United States) Brian Harman	66-69=135	−9
T3	(England) Ian Poulter	69-66=135	−9
T7	(Australia) Jason Day	70-66=136	−8
T7	(United States) Kevin Kisner	68-68=136	−8
T7	(United States) Keith Mitchell	71-65=136	−8
T10	(South Korea) An Byeong-hun	66-71=137	−7
T10	(United States) Dustin Johnson	69-68=137	−7
T10	(United States) Luke List	69-68=137	−7
T10	(United States) J. T. Poston	68-69=137	−7
T10	(Spain) Jon Rahm	69-68=137	−7
T10	(Slovakia) Rory Sabbatini	68-69=137	−7
T10	(United States) Vaughn Taylor	67-70=137	−7

=== Third round ===
Saturday, March 16, 2019

Place	Player	Score	To par
1	(Spain) Jon Rahm	69-68-64=201	−15
T2	(England) Tommy Fleetwood	65-67-70=202	−14
T2	(Northern Ireland) Rory McIlroy	67-65-70=202	−14
4	(Australia) Jason Day	70-66-68=204	−12
5	(Mexico) Abraham Ancer	69-66-70=205	−11
T6	(United States) Keegan Bradley	65-73-68=206	−10
T6	(United States) Jim Furyk	71-64-71=206	−10
T6	(United States) Brian Harman	66-69-71=206	−10
T6	(United States) Dustin Johnson	69-68-69=206	−10
T6	(United States) Ollie Schniederjans	71-70-65=206	−10
T6	(United States) Brandt Snedeker	69-72-65=206	−10

=== Final round ===
Sunday, March 17, 2019

Champion
(c) = past champion

Place	Player	Score	To par	Money ($)
1	(Northern Ireland) Rory McIlroy	67-65-70-70=272	−16	2,250,000
2	(United States) Jim Furyk	71-64-71-67=273	−15	1,350,000
T3	(England) Eddie Pepperell	72-68-68-66=274	−14	725,000
T3	(Venezuela) Jhonattan Vegas	72-69-67-66=274	−14	725,000
T5	(England) Tommy Fleetwood	65-67-70-73=275	−13	456,250
T5	(United States) Dustin Johnson	69-68-69-69=275	−13	456,250
T5	(United States) Brandt Snedeker	69-72-65-69=275	−13	456,250
T8	(Australia) Jason Day (c)	70-66-68-72=276	−12	350,000
T8	(United States) Brian Harman	66-69-71-70=276	−12	350,000
T8	(Japan) Hideki Matsuyama	71-72-66-67=276	−12	350,000
T8	(England) Justin Rose	74-66-68-68=276	−12	350,000

Leaderboard below the top 10
Place	Player	Score	To par	Money ($)
T12	(Mexico) Abraham Ancer	69-66-70-72=277	−11	253,125
T12	(United States) Joel Dahmen	69-71-67-70=277	−11	253,125
T12	(Spain) Jon Rahm	69-68-64-76=277	−11	253,125
T12	(Australia) Adam Scott (c)	70-69-68-70=277	−11	253,125
T16	(United States) Keegan Bradley	65-73-68-72=278	−10	193,750
T16	(United States) Ollie Schniederjans	71-70-65-72=278	−10	193,750
T16	(United States) Webb Simpson (c)	70-70-70-68=278	−10	193,750
T16	(Canada) Nick Taylor	73-69-69-67=278	−10	193,750
T20	(United States) Bryson DeChambeau	70-69-69-71=279	−9	156,250
T20	(United States) Ryan Moore	67-74-69-69=279	−9	156,250
T22	(United States) Tony Finau	69-71-68-72=280	−8	125,000
T22	(Spain) Sergio García (c)	69-70-74-67=280	−8	125,000
T22	(United States) Kevin Kisner	68-68-71-73=280	−8	125,000
T22	(United States) J. T. Poston	68-69-73-70=280	−8	125,000
T26	(South Korea) An Byeong-hun	66-71-73-71=281	−7	94,375
T26	(Argentina) Emiliano Grillo	70-72-73-66=281	−7	94,375
T26	(United States) Billy Horschel	69-70-73-69=281	−7	94,375
T26	(United States) Matt Kuchar (c)	69-70-72-70=281	−7	94,375
T30	(Denmark) Lucas Bjerregaard	70-70-70-72=282	−6	77,625
T30	(United States) Tom Hoge	69-71-70-72=282	−6	77,625
T30	(England) Matt Wallace	69-73-70-70=282	−6	77,625
T30	(United States) Gary Woodland	72-69-73-68=282	−6	77,625
T30	(United States) Tiger Woods (c)	70-71-72-69=282	−6	77,625
T35	(United States) Brice Garnett	71-69-73-70=283	−5	60,312
T35	(United States) Charles Howell III	69-70-75-69=283	−5	60,312
T35	(Scotland) Russell Knox	70-68-73-72=283	−5	60,312
T35	(Republic of Ireland) Séamus Power	74-67-73-69=283	−5	60,312
T35	(Slovakia) Rory Sabbatini	68-69-74-72=283	−5	60,312
T35	(United States) Justin Thomas	71-72-70-70=283	−5	60,312
T41	(Canada) Corey Conners	72-70-68-74=284	−4	45,000
T41	(England) Matt Fitzpatrick	70-71-72-71=284	−4	45,000
T41	(United States) Denny McCarthy	69-72-72-71=284	−4	45,000
T41	(Denmark) Thorbjørn Olesen	70-69-76-69=284	−4	45,000
T41	(United States) Vaughn Taylor	67-70-71-76=284	−4	45,000
T41	(United States) Martin Trainer	73-69-72-70=284	−4	45,000
T47	(United States) Bud Cauley	69-70-76-70=285	−3	31,388
T47	(United States) Rickie Fowler (c)	74-67-68-76=285	−3	31,388
T47	(South Korea) Kang Sung-hoon	73-66-74-72=285	−3	31,388
T47	(United States) Jason Kokrak	73-68-74-70=285	−3	31,388
T47	(United States) Kelly Kraft	73-70-71-71=285	−3	31,388
T47	(United States) Andrew Landry	73-68-73-71=285	−3	31,388
T47	(United States) Keith Mitchell	71-65-75-74=285	−3	31,388
T47	(United States) Patrick Reed	69-69-69-78=285	−3	31,388
T47	(United States) Richy Werenski	72-71-68-74=285	−3	31,388
T56	(United States) Brian Gay	76-67-68-75=286	−2	27,250
T56	(South Korea) Kim Si-woo (c)	73-68-72-73=286	−2	27,250
T56	(United States) Chris Kirk	74-69-72-71=286	−2	27,250
T56	(United States) Brooks Koepka	72-71-73-70=286	−2	27,250
T56	(United States) Luke List	69-68-75-74=286	−2	27,250
T56	(Italy) Francesco Molinari	72-70-72-72=286	−2	27,250
T56	(South Africa) Louis Oosthuizen	73-70-73-70=286	−2	27,250
T56	(United States) Scott Piercy	74-68-72-72=286	−2	27,250
T56	(England) Ian Poulter	69-66-75-76=286	−2	27,250
T56	(Australia) Cameron Smith	72-70-73-71=286	−2	27,250
T56	(United States) Bubba Watson	72-71-70-73=286	−2	27,250
T67	(United States) Daniel Berger	75-68-70-74=287	−1	25,500
T67	(United States) Scott Langley	69-72-75-71=287	−1	25,500
T67	(United States) Jimmy Walker	75-68-73-71=287	−1	25,500
70	(United States) Michael Thompson	69-71-72-76=288	E	25,000
71	(Germany) Martin Kaymer (c)	71-69-73-78=291	+3	24,750
T72	(South Africa) Branden Grace	73-70-72-77=292	+4	24,375
T72	(Taiwan) Pan Cheng-tsung	72-70-74-76=292	+4	24,375
T74	(United States) Jason Dufner	70-73-74=217	+1	23,750
T74	(United States) Tyler Duncan	70-71-76=217	+1	23,750
T74	(India) Anirban Lahiri	70-71-76=217	+1	23,750
77	(United States) Patrick Rodgers	72-70-76=218	+2	23,250
78	(United States) Kevin Na	71-70-78=219	+3	23,000
T79	(United States) Patton Kizzire	71-70-79=220	+4	22,625
T79	(United States) Adam Long	71-72-77=220	+4	22,625
CUT	(United States) Beau Hossler	70-74=144	E	
CUT	(South Korea) Im Sung-jae	73-71=144	E	
CUT	(Australia) Marc Leishman	71-73=144	E	
CUT	(China) Li Haotong	69-75=144	E	
CUT	(United States) Troy Merritt	71-73=144	E	
CUT	(United States) Trey Mullinax	69-75=144	E	
CUT	(United States) Xander Schauffele	70-74=144	E	
CUT	(United States) Scott Stallings	71-73=144	E	
CUT	(United States) Kyle Stanley	68-76=144	E	
CUT	(United States) Brendan Steele	68-76=144	E	
CUT	(United States) Kevin Streelman	73-71=144	E	
CUT	(United States) Dominic Bozzelli	74-71=145	+1	
CUT	(United States) Russell Henley	73-72=145	+1	
CUT	(United States) J. B. Holmes	73-72=145	+1	
CUT	(United States) Ryan Palmer	71-74=145	+1	
CUT	(United States) Chez Reavie	71-74=145	+1	
CUT	(United States) Sam Ryder	74-71=145	+1	
CUT	(United States) Jordan Spieth	76-69=145	+1	
CUT	(Sweden) Henrik Stenson (c)	75-70=145	+1	
CUT	(United States) Nick Watney	70-75=145	+1	
CUT	(United States) Aaron Wise	71-74=145	+1	
CUT	(United States) Ryan Armour	72-74=146	+2	
CUT	(United States) Ryan Blaum	71-75=146	+2	
CUT	(United States) Patrick Cantlay	75-71=146	+2	
CUT	(Germany) Alex Čejka	73-73=146	+2	
CUT	(United States) Harris English	70-76=146	+2	
CUT	(United States) Chesson Hadley	76-70=146	+2	
CUT	(Scotland) Martin Laird	76-70=146	+2	
CUT	(Sweden) Alex Norén	70-76=146	+2	
CUT	(United States) Brian Stuard	75-71=146	+2	
CUT	(United States) Stewart Cink	77-70=147	+3	
CUT	(United States) Austin Cook	72-75=147	+3	
CUT	(United States) Talor Gooch	72-75=147	+3	
CUT	(Republic of Ireland) Shane Lowry	73-74=147	+3	
CUT	(United States) Peter Uihlein	72-75=147	+3	
CUT	(Australia) Aaron Baddeley	75-73=148	+4	
CUT	(United States) Scott Brown	75-73=148	+4	
CUT	(United States) Lucas Glover	76-72=148	+4	
CUT	(England) Tyrrell Hatton	74-74=148	+4	
CUT	(United States) Phil Mickelson (c)	74-74=148	+4	
CUT	(United States) Ted Potter Jr.	74-74=148	+4	
CUT	(United States) Sam Saunders	75-73=148	+4	
CUT	(United States) Kevin Tway	76-72=148	+4	
CUT	(England) Danny Willett	75-73=148	+4	
CUT	(United States) Bronson Burgoon	73-76=149	+5	
CUT	(South Africa) Charl Schwartzel	75-74=149	+5	
CUT	(Fiji) Vijay Singh	73-76=149	+5	
CUT	(United States) Brandon Harkins	69-81=150	+6	
CUT	(United States) John Huh	74-76=150	+6	
CUT	(United States) Zach Johnson	73-77=150	+6	
CUT	(Japan) Satoshi Kodaira	74-76=150	+6	
CUT	(United States) Grayson Murray	72-78=150	+6	
CUT	(United States) Harold Varner III	74-76=150	+6	
CUT	(Canada) Adam Hadwin	76-75=151	+7	
CUT	(United States) Andrew Putnam	76-75=151	+7	
CUT	(England) Paul Casey	78-74=152	+8	
CUT	(United States) Charley Hoffman	75-77=152	+8	
CUT	(United States) Michael Kim	74-78=152	+8	
CUT	(New Zealand) Danny Lee	75-77=152	+8	
CUT	(Thailand) Kiradech Aphibarnrat	84-69=153	+9	
CUT	(Spain) Rafa Cabrera-Bello	77-76=153	+9	
WD	(United States) J. J. Spaun	76	+4	
WD	(United States) Cameron Champ	78	+6	
DQ	(United States) Wyndham Clark			

==== Scorecard ====
Final round

Hole	1	2	3	4	5	6	7	8	9	10	11	12	13	14	15	16	17	18
Par	4	5	3	4	4	4	4	3	5	4	5	4	3	4	4	5	3	4
(Northern Ireland) McIlroy	−14	−14	−14	−12	−12	−13	−12	−12	−13	−13	−14	−15	−15	−14	−15	−16	−16	−16
(United States) Furyk	−9	−11	−11	−11	−12	−12	−12	−12	−12	−13	−14	−14	−14	−14	−13	−14	−14	−15
(England) Pepperell	−8	−7	−7	−7	−7	−7	−8	−8	−9	−9	−10	−10	−11	−11	−12	−13	−14	−14
(Venezuela) Vegas	−9	−10	−10	−10	−10	−10	−11	−11	−11	−11	−11	−12	−12	−12	−12	−13	−14	−14
(England) Fleetwood	−13	−13	−13	−13	−13	−13	−13	−13	−13	−13	−12	−13	−13	−13	−12	−14	−13	−13
(Spain) Rahm	−14	−14	−13	−12	−12	−13	−13	−14	−14	−14	−13	−13	−14	−14	−13	−13	−11	−11

Cumulative tournament scores, relative to par

Eagle	Birdie	Bogey	Double bogey
