= 2025 PGA Championship =

Golf tournament

Tournament information
- Dates: May 15–18, 2025
- Location: Charlotte, North Carolina, U.S. 35.116°N 80.842°W
- Course: Quail Hollow Club
- Tours: PGA Tour; European Tour; Japan Golf Tour

Statistics
- Par: 71
- Length: 7,626 yards (6,973 m)
- Field: 156 players, 74 after cut
- Cut: 143 (+1)
- Prize fund: $19,000,000
- Winner's share: $3,420,000

Champion
- (United States) Scottie Scheffler
- 273 (−11)

Location map
- Location in the United States Location in North Carolina

The 2025 PGA Championship was the 107th edition of the PGA Championship and the second of the four men's major golf championships held in 2025. The tournament was held on May 15–18 at the Quail Hollow Club in Charlotte, North Carolina, United States.

Scottie Scheffler won his first PGA Championship and third major by five strokes over Bryson DeChambeau, Harris English and Davis Riley.

== Venue ==
This is the second PGA Championship at Quail Hollow, which previously hosted in 2017. The course hosts the Truist Championship (formerly the Wells Fargo Championship) on the PGA Tour (2003–present), though not in 2017 (it was held in Wilmington at the Eagle Point Golf Club) and 2025 (it was held at the Philadelphia Cricket Club). In 2016, it played as a par-72 at 7,575 yards (6,927 m). It was also the home of the tour's Kemper Open (1969–1979) and the Champions Tour PaineWebber World Seniors Invitational in the 1980s.

Hole	Yards	Par	Hole	Yards	Par
1	505	4	10	592	5
2	452	4	11	462	4
3	483	4	12	456	4
4	184	3	13	205	3
5	449	4	14	344	4
6	249	3	15	577	5
7	546	5	16	529	4
8	346	4	17	223	3
9	530	4	18	494	4
Out	3,744	35	In	3,882	36
Source:		Total		7,626	71

== Field ==
=== Criteria ===
This list details the qualification criteria for the 2025 PGA Championship and the players who qualified under them; any additional criteria under which players qualified are indicated in parentheses.

1. All past winners of the PGA Championship

- Keegan Bradley (10,12)
- Jason Day (10)
- Jason Dufner
- Pádraig Harrington
- Martin Kaymer
- Brooks Koepka
- Rory McIlroy (2,5,8,10,11,12)
- Shaun Micheel
- Phil Mickelson
- Collin Morikawa (4,8,10,11)
- Xander Schauffele (4,10,11,12)
- Justin Thomas (10,11,12)
- Jimmy Walker
- Paul Azinger, Rich Beem, Mark Brooks, John Daly, Steve Elkington, Raymond Floyd, Al Geiberger, Wayne Grady, David Graham, Davis Love III, John Mahaffey, Larry Nelson, Bobby Nichols, Jack Nicklaus, Gary Player, Nick Price, Vijay Singh, Jeff Sluman, Dave Stockton, Hal Sutton, David Toms, Lee Trevino, Bob Tway, Lanny Wadkins, Tiger Woods, and Yang Yong-eun did not play.

2. Recent winners of the Masters Tournament (2021–2025)

- Hideki Matsuyama (10,12)
- Jon Rahm (3,11)
- Scottie Scheffler (5,8,10,11,12)

3. Recent winners of the U.S. Open (2020–2024)

- Wyndham Clark (10,11)
- Bryson DeChambeau (8,10,12)
- Matt Fitzpatrick (11)

4. Recent winners of The Open Championship (2019–2024)

- Brian Harman (10,11,12)
- Shane Lowry (8,10,11)
- Cameron Smith

5. Recent winners of The Players Championship (2023–2025)

6. The top three on the Official World Golf Ranking's International Federation Ranking List as of April 28, 2025

- John Catlin (Note: 2024 Asian Tour Order of Merit winner.)
- Takumi Kanaya (Note: 2024 Japan Golf Tour money list winner.)
- Daniel van Tonder (Note: 2024–25 Sunshine Tour Order of Merit winner.)

7. Current Senior PGA Champion

- Richard Bland

8. The leading 15 players, and those tying for 15th place, in the 2024 PGA Championship

- Dean Burmester
- Thomas Detry (10,12)
- Lee Hodges
- Viktor Hovland (10,11,12)
- Robert MacIntyre (10,11,12)
- Taylor Moore
- Alex Norén
- Justin Rose (10,11)
- Billy Horschel (10) and Sahith Theegala (10) did not play.

9. The leading 20 players in the 2025 PGA Professional Championship

- Brian Bergstol
- Brandon Bingaman
- Michael Block
- Andre Chi
- Tyler Collet
- Jesse Droemer
- Bobby Gates
- Larkin Gross
- Justin Hicks
- Nic Ishee
- Tom Johnson
- Michael Kartrude
- Greg Koch
- Ryan Lenahan
- Dylan Newman
- John Somers
- Bob Sowards
- Eric Steger
- Rupe Taylor
- Timothy Wiseman

10. Top 70 players who are eligible and have earned the most PGA Championship Points from the 2024 CJ Cup Byron Nelson through the 2025 CJ Cup Byron Nelson

- Ludvig Åberg (11,12)
- An Byeong-hun
- Daniel Berger
- Christiaan Bezuidenhout
- Akshay Bhatia
- Jacob Bridgeman
- Sam Burns (11)
- Patrick Cantlay (11)
- Bud Cauley
- Eric Cole
- Corey Conners
- Cameron Davis (12)
- Nick Dunlap (12)
- Nico Echavarría (12)
- Austin Eckroat (12)
- Harris English (12)
- Tony Finau
- Tommy Fleetwood (11)
- Lucas Glover
- Max Greyserman
- Ben Griffin (12)
- Adam Hadwin
- Harry Hall (12)
- Russell Henley (12)
- Joe Highsmith (12)
- Tom Hoge
- Mackenzie Hughes
- Im Sung-jae
- Stephan Jäger
- Michael Kim
- Kim Si-woo
- Tom Kim
- Min Woo Lee (12)
- Denny McCarthy
- Matt McCarty (12)
- Maverick McNealy (12)
- Andrew Novak (12)
- Taylor Pendrith
- J. T. Poston (12)
- Séamus Power
- Aaron Rai (12)
- Davis Riley (12)
- Patrick Rodgers
- Adam Scott
- J. J. Spaun
- Jordan Spieth (11)
- Sam Stevens
- Sepp Straka (11,12)
- Nick Taylor (12)
- Davis Thompson (12)
- Jhonattan Vegas (12)
- Kevin Yu (12)

11. Playing members of the 2023 Ryder Cup teams, who are ranked within the top 100 on the Official World Golf Ranking as of May 5, 2025

- Tyrrell Hatton
- Max Homa
- Nicolai Højgaard

12. Winners of official tournaments on the PGA Tour from the 2024 PGA Championship until the start of the championship

- Brian Campbell
- Rafael Campos
- Ryan Fox
- Garrick Higgo
- Patton Kizzire
- Karl Vilips

13. Top 3 finishers on the DP World Tour Asian Swing event rankings

- Eugenio Chacarra
- Keita Nakajima
- Marco Penge

14. PGA of America invitees

- Laurie Canter
- Luke Donald
- Rickie Fowler
- Sergio García
- Ryan Gerard
- Ryo Hisatsune
- Rasmus Højgaard
- Beau Hossler
- Dustin Johnson
- Johnny Keefer
- Chris Kirk
- Kurt Kitayama
- Jake Knapp
- Thriston Lawrence
- Justin Lower
- Max McGreevy
- Tom McKibbin
- Keith Mitchell
- Rasmus Neergaard-Petersen
- Joaquín Niemann
- Niklas Nørgaard
- Thorbjørn Olesen
- John Parry
- Matthieu Pavon
- David Puig
- Patrick Reed
- Elvis Smylie (Note: 2024–25 PGA Tour of Australasia Order of Merit winner.)
- Sami Välimäki
- Erik van Rooyen
- Matt Wallace
- Gary Woodland
- Cameron Young
- Will Zalatoris
- Shaun Norris was invited but did not play.

15. If necessary, the field is completed by players in order of PGA Championship points earned (per 10)

- Patrick Fishburn (71st) (Note: Patrick Fishburn and Rico Hoey replaced Billy Horschel and Shaun Norris.)
- Rico Hoey (74th)
- Michael Thorbjornsen (82nd) (Note: Michael Thorbjornsen replaced Vijay Singh.)
- Victor Perez (83rd) (Note: Victor Perez took the place reserved for the winner of the Truist Championship.)
- Alex Smalley (87th) (Note: Alex Smalley replaced Sahith Theegala.)

== Round summaries ==
=== First round ===
Thursday, May 15, 2025

Jhonattan Vegas shot a 7-under-par 64 to lead by two strokes after the first round. Vegas also set the first time any player has led any round of a major from Venezuela. Defending champion Xander Schauffele shot 1-over-par 72.

47-year-old former world number one Luke Donald shot a bogey-free 67, the only player not to make a bogey during the first round. Donald was ranked 871st in the Official World Golf Ranking prior to the 2025 PGA Championship and had missed the cut in all of his starts during 2025.

Place	Player	Score	To par
1	(Venezuela) Jhonattan Vegas	64	−7
T2	(Australia) Cameron Davis	66	−5
T2	(United States) Ryan Gerard	66	−5
T4	(England) Luke Donald	67	−4
T4	(New Zealand) Ryan Fox	67	−4
T4	(Germany) Stephan Jäger	67	−4
T4	(England) Aaron Rai	67	−4
T4	(United States) Alex Smalley	67	−4
T9	(United States) Keegan Bradley	68	−3
T9	(Puerto Rico) Rafael Campos	68	−3
T9	(Colombia) Nico Echavarría	68	−3
T9	(England) Matt Fitzpatrick	68	−3
T9	(England) Tyrrell Hatton	68	−3
T9	(Japan) Ryo Hisatsune	68	−3
T9	(Denmark) Rasmus Højgaard	68	−3
T9	(Scotland) Robert MacIntyre	68	−3
T9	(Sweden) Alex Norén	68	−3
T9	(United States) J. T. Poston	68	−3
T9	(United States) Michael Thorbjornsen	68	−3

=== Second round ===
Friday, May 16, 2025

Jhonattan Vegas shot a one-under-par 70 to hold a 2 shot lead after 36 holes. He became the first Venezuelan golfer to hold a lead at a major after any round. Max Homa and Kim Si-Woo shot the lowest rounds of the day with a 64. Notable players to miss the cut included Jordan Spieth, 2017 champion Justin Thomas, two-time champion Phil Mickelson, and the winner at the Truist Championship the week before Sepp Straka.

Place	Player	Score	To par
1	(Venezuela) Jhonattan Vegas	64-70=134	−8
T2	(England) Matt Fitzpatrick	68-68=136	−6
T2	(South Korea) Kim Si-woo	72-64=136	−6
T2	(France) Matthieu Pavon	71-65=136	−6
T5	(United States) Max Homa	73-64=137	−5
T5	(United States) Scottie Scheffler	69-68=137	−5
T7	(South Africa) Christiaan Bezuidenhout	70-68=138	−4
T7	(New Zealand) Ryan Fox	67-71=138	−4
T7	(United States) Ryan Gerard	66-72=138	−4
T7	(South Africa) Garrick Higgo	69-69=138	−4
T7	(Scotland) Robert MacIntyre	68-70=138	−4
T7	(United States) Denny McCarthy	70-68=138	−4
T7	(United States) J. T. Poston	68-70=138	−4
T7	(United States) Alex Smalley	67-71=138	−4
T7	(United States) Sam Stevens	70-68=138	−4
T7	(United States) Michael Thorbjornsen	68-70=138	−4

=== Third round ===
Saturday, May 17, 2025

World number one Scottie Scheffler shot 65, the low round of the day, to take the lead at 11-under-par. At the 304-yard (278 m) par-4 14th, he hit his tee shot to within 3 feet of the hole and made eagle. He birdied three of his final four holes to establish a three-shot advantage over Alex Norén. Prior to the PGA Championship, Norén had played only one tournament in 2025 due to tearing a hamstring tendon in January. In 39 previous major starts, his best finish was a tie for sixth at the 2017 Open Championship.

Two-time major champion and 2024 PGA Championship runner-up Bryson DeChambeau held the outright lead after 15 holes, but dropped three shots in the closing stretch, including hitting his tee shot into the water on 17, to fall back to 5-under-par.

Place	Player	Score	To par
1	(United States) Scottie Scheffler	69-68-65=202	−11
2	(Sweden) Alex Norén	68-71-66=205	−8
T3	(United States) J. T. Poston	68-70-68=206	−7
T3	(United States) Davis Riley	71-68-67=206	−7
T5	(South Korea) Kim Si-woo	72-64-71=207	−6
T5	(Spain) Jon Rahm	70-70-67=207	−6
T5	(Venezuela) Jhonattan Vegas	64-70-73=207	−6
T8	(United States) Keegan Bradley	68-72-68=208	−5
T8	(United States) Bryson DeChambeau	71-68-69=208	−5
T8	(United States) Tony Finau	70-69-69=208	−5
T8	(England) Matt Fitzpatrick	68-68-72=208	−5
T8	(France) Matthieu Pavon	71-65-72=208	−5

=== Final round ===
Sunday, May 18, 2025

World number one Scottie Scheffler shot 71, finished at 11-under-par, five strokes over Bryson DeChambeau, Harris English and Davis Riley in final round. Scheffler won his first PGA Championship and third major title. Jon Rahm was briefly tied with Scheffler after a birdie at the difficult 11th and Scheffler's +2 front nine. However, Rahm went +5 over the last three holes, the "Green Mile", to fall to tied-8th. Bryson DeChambeau got to −7 with a birdie at 15 but bogeyed the last to finish tied for second. Harris English birdied six of the last 12 holes to join DeChambeau as runner-up, and Davis Riley recovered from a triple bogey at 7 to join the group with a 73. It is the best major finish for both English and Riley.

==== Final leaderboard ====
Champion
(c) = past champion

Place	Player	Score	To par	Money ($)
1	(United States) Scottie Scheffler	69-68-65-71=273	−11	3,420,000
T2	(United States) Bryson DeChambeau	71-68-69-70=278	−6	1,418,667
T2	(United States) Harris English	72-70-71-65=278	−6	1,418,667
T2	(United States) Davis Riley	71-68-67-72=278	−6	1,418,667
T5	(Canada) Taylor Pendrith	69-70-72-68=279	−5	694,700
T5	(United States) J. T. Poston	68-70-68-73=279	−5	694,700
T5	(Venezuela) Jhonattan Vegas	64-70-73-72=279	−5	694,700
T8	(United States) Keegan Bradley (c)	68-72-68-72=280	−4	454,781
T8	(England) Matt Fitzpatrick	68-68-72-72=280	−4	454,781
T8	(United States) Ryan Gerard	66-72-72-70=280	−4	454,781
T8	(United States) Ben Griffin	70-69-72-69=280	−4	454,781
T8	(United States) Joe Highsmith	73-67-69-71=280	−4	454,781
T8	(South Korea) Kim Si-woo	72-64-71-73=280	−4	454,781
T8	(United States) Denny McCarthy	70-68-72-70=280	−4	454,781
T8	(Chile) Joaquín Niemann	74-67-71-68=280	−4	454,781
T8	(Spain) Jon Rahm	70-70-67-73=280	−4	454,781

Leaderboard below the top 10
Place	Player	Score	To par	Money ($)
T17	(Sweden) Alex Norén	68-71-66-76=281	−3	290,925
T17	(England) Matt Wallace	71-70-68-72=281	−3	290,925
T19	(United States) Sam Burns	73-70-72-67=282	−2	193,442
T19	(Canada) Corey Conners	73-68-74-67=282	−2	193,442
T19	(Australia) Cameron Davis	66-74-70-72=282	−2	193,442
T19	(United States) Tony Finau	70-69-69-74=282	−2	193,442
T19	(England) Harry Hall	69-72-71-70=282	−2	193,442
T19	(United States) Beau Hossler	71-70-73-68=282	−2	193,442
T19	(United States) Taylor Moore	73-69-70-70=282	−2	193,442
T19	(England) Aaron Rai	67-72-74-69=282	−2	193,442
T19	(Australia) Adam Scott	69-71-69-73=282	−2	193,442
T28	(New Zealand) Ryan Fox	67-71-72-73=283	−1	115,820
T28	(Norway) Viktor Hovland	69-71-72-71=283	−1	115,820
T28	(England) Marco Penge	69-71-74-69=283	−1	115,820
T28	(United States) Xander Schauffele (c)	72-71-72-68=283	−1	115,820
T28	(United States) Alex Smalley	67-71-73-72=283	−1	115,820
T33	(United States) Daniel Berger	71-71-74-68=284	E	89,193
T33	(United States) Max Greyserman	71-72-67-74=284	E	89,193
T33	(United States) Maverick McNealy	70-72-69-73=284	E	89,193
T33	(Denmark) Thorbjørn Olesen	71-71-72-70=284	E	89,193
T37	(England) Richard Bland	70-69-76-70=285	+1	75,423
T37	(United States) Lucas Glover	71-70-69-75=285	+1	75,423
T37	(Japan) Ryo Hisatsune	68-71-72-74=285	+1	75,423
T37	(United States) J. J. Spaun	71-68-72-74=285	+1	75,423
T41	(United States) Eric Cole	70-70-73-73=286	+2	60,677
T41	(Colombia) Nico Echavarría	68-74-71-73=286	+2	60,677
T41	(England) Tommy Fleetwood	70-70-76-70=286	+2	60,677
T41	(Denmark) Nicolai Højgaard	72-69-77-68=286	+2	60,677
T41	(France) Matthieu Pavon	71-65-72-78=286	+2	60,677
T41	(United States) Michael Thorbjornsen	68-70-74-74=286	+2	60,677
T47	(Scotland) Robert MacIntyre	68-70-73-76=287	+3	49,190
T47	(Northern Ireland) Rory McIlroy (c)	74-69-72-72=287	+3	49,190
T47	(United States) Cameron Young	73-69-71-74=287	+3	49,190
T50	(South Africa) Christiaan Bezuidenhout	70-68-77-73=288	+4	40,674
T50	(United States) Wyndham Clark	72-69-73-74=288	+4	40,674
T50	(Northern Ireland) Tom McKibbin	70-71-74-73=288	+4	40,674
T50	(United States) Collin Morikawa (c)	70-72-74-72=288	+4	40,674
T50	(Taiwan) Kevin Yu	73-70-74-71=288	+4	40,674
T55	(United States) Brian Campbell	73-69-78-69=289	+5	32,138
T55	(Puerto Rico) Rafael Campos	68-73-72-76=289	+5	32,138
T55	(South Africa) Garrick Higgo	69-69-71-80=289	+5	32,138
T55	(United States) Michael Kim	71-72-75-71=289	+5	32,138
T55	(United States) Chris Kirk	73-70-78-68=289	+5	32,138
T60	(England) Luke Donald	67-74-73-76=290	+6	27,014
T60	(United States) Brian Harman	71-72-76-71=290	+6	27,014
T60	(England) Tyrrell Hatton	68-73-72-77=290	+6	27,014
T60	(United States) Max Homa	73-64-76-77=290	+6	27,014
T60	(United States) Justin Lower	69-73-75-73=290	+6	27,014
T60	(Spain) David Puig	71-72-68-79=290	+6	27,014
T60	(United States) Sam Stevens	70-68-77-75=290	+6	27,014
T67	(United States) Austin Eckroat	72-70-77-72=291	+7	24,927
T67	(Spain) Sergio García	75-68-79-69=291	+7	24,927
T67	(Denmark) Rasmus Højgaard	68-74-75-74=291	+7	24,927
70	(Germany) Stephan Jäger	67-75-76-74=292	+8	24,240
71	(South Korea) Tom Kim	71-72-75-75=293	+9	23,940
T72	(United States) Bud Cauley	74-69-77-74=294	+10	23,655
T72	(Australia) Elvis Smylie	70-73-77-74=294	+10	23,655
74	(South Korea) An Byeong-hun	69-73-79-76=297	+13	23,420
CUT	(United States) Akshay Bhatia	70-74=144	+2	
CUT	(Republic of Ireland) Pádraig Harrington (c)	73-71=144	+2	
CUT	(United States) Tom Hoge	75-69=144	+2	
CUT	(United States) Kurt Kitayama	73-71=144	+2	
CUT	(United States) Jake Knapp	73-71=144	+2	
CUT	(Republic of Ireland) Shane Lowry	73-71=144	+2	
CUT	(Denmark) Rasmus Neergaard-Petersen	74-70=144	+2	
CUT	(United States) Jordan Spieth	76-68=144	+2	
CUT	(Austria) Sepp Straka	73-71=144	+2	
CUT	(Sweden) Ludvig Åberg	70-75=145	+3	
CUT	(United States) John Catlin	74-71=145	+3	
CUT	(Japan) Takumi Kanaya	75-70=145	+3	
CUT	(South Africa) Thriston Lawrence	73-72=145	+3	
CUT	(Japan) Hideki Matsuyama	72-73=145	+3	
CUT	(United States) Keith Mitchell	72-73=145	+3	
CUT	(Denmark) Niklas Nørgaard	75-70=145	+3	
CUT	(France) Victor Perez	73-72=145	+3	
CUT	(United States) Justin Thomas (c)	73-72=145	+3	
CUT	(Spain) Eugenio Chacarra	73-73=146	+4	
CUT	(Belgium) Thomas Detry	74-72=146	+4	
CUT	(United States) Patrick Fishburn	77-69=146	+4	
CUT	(United States) Rickie Fowler	73-73=146	+4	
CUT	(Australia) Min Woo Lee	74-72=146	+4	
CUT	(United States) Matt McCarty	72-74=146	+4	
CUT	(Republic of Ireland) Séamus Power	72-74=146	+4	
CUT	(United States) Patrick Reed	72-74=146	+4	
CUT	(United States) Jimmy Walker (c)	72-74=146	+4	
CUT	(United States) Gary Woodland	74-72=146	+4	
CUT	(South Korea) Im Sung-jae	73-74=147	+5	
CUT	(United States) Max McGreevy	73-74=147	+5	
CUT	(Japan) Keita Nakajima	76-71=147	+5	
CUT	(South Africa) Daniel van Tonder	73-74=147	+5	
CUT	(United States) Jacob Bridgeman	75-73=148	+6	
CUT	(South Africa) Dean Burmester	74-74=148	+6	
CUT	(United States) Patrick Cantlay	74-74=148	+6	
CUT	(Australia) Jason Day (c)	73-75=148	+6	
CUT	(United States) Lee Hodges	75-73=148	+6	
CUT	(Canada) Nick Taylor	76-72=148	+6	
CUT	(United States) Davis Thompson	75-73=148	+6	
CUT	(United States) Will Zalatoris	72-76=148	+6	
CUT	(United States) Johnny Keefer	76-73=149	+7	
CUT	(Australia) Cameron Smith	78-71=149	+7	
CUT	(South Africa) Erik van Rooyen	70-79=149	+7	
CUT	(England) Laurie Canter	75-75=150	+8	
CUT	(United States) Nick Dunlap	78-72=150	+8	
CUT	(Germany) Martin Kaymer (c)	78-72=150	+8	
CUT	(United States) Shaun Micheel (c)	74-76=150	+8	
CUT	(United States) Andrew Novak	70-80=150	+8	
CUT	(England) John Parry	76-74=150	+8	
CUT	(United States) Tyler Collet	73-78=151	+9	
CUT	(Canada) Mackenzie Hughes	78-73=151	+9	
CUT	(United States) Brooks Koepka (c)	75-76=151	+9	
CUT	(United States) Phil Mickelson (c)	79-72=151	+9	
CUT	(United States) Patrick Rodgers	80-71=151	+9	
CUT	(England) Justin Rose	76-75=151	+9	
CUT	(United States) John Somers	75-76=151	+9	
CUT	(Finland) Sami Välimäki	74-77=151	+9	
CUT	(United States) Russell Henley	77-75=152	+10	
CUT	(United States) Tom Johnson	74-78=152	+10	
CUT	(United States) Michael Kartrude	76-76=152	+10	
CUT	(United States) Bob Sowards	78-74=152	+10	
CUT	(United States) Eric Steger	76-76=152	+10	
CUT	(United States) Jesse Droemer	79-74=153	+11	
CUT	(Canada) Adam Hadwin	73-80=153	+11	
CUT	(Philippines) Rico Hoey	75-78=153	+11	
CUT	(United States) Ryan Lenahan	76-77=153	+11	
CUT	(United States) Dylan Newman	75-78=153	+11	
CUT	(Australia) Karl Vilips	78-75=153	+11	
CUT	(United States) Brandon Bingaman	78-76=154	+12	
CUT	(United States) Dustin Johnson	78-76=154	+12	
CUT	(United States) Jason Dufner (c)	78-77=155	+13	
CUT	(United States) Bobby Gates	80-75=155	+13	
CUT	(United States) Justin Hicks	76-79=155	+13	
CUT	(United States) Timothy Wiseman	78-77=155	+13	
CUT	(United States) Brian Bergstol	77-79=156	+14	
CUT	(United States) Michael Block	75-82=157	+15	
CUT	(United States) Nic Ishee	82-76=158	+16	
CUT	(United States) Andre Chi	82-79=161	+19	
CUT	(United States) Larkin Gross	79-82=161	+19	
CUT	(United States) Rupe Taylor	80-84=164	+22	
CUT	(United States) Greg Koch	82-83=165	+23	
WD	(United States) Patton Kizzire	74	+3	

==== Scorecard ====
Hole	1	2	3	4	5	6	7	8	9	10	11	12	13	14	15	16	17	18
Par	4	4	4	3	4	3	5	4	4	5	4	4	3	4	5	4	3	4
(United States) Scheffler	−10	−11	−11	−11	−11	−10	−10	−10	−9	−10	−10	−10	−10	−11	−12	−12	−12	−11
(United States) DeChambeau	−5	−5	−5	−5	−4	−4	−5	−5	−6	−6	−6	−6	−5	−6	−7	−7	−7	−6
(United States) English	E	E	E	−1	−1	E	−1	−1	−1	−1	−2	−3	−3	−4	−5	−5	−5	−6
(United States) Riley	−6	−6	−6	−6	−7	−6	−3	−4	−4	−5	−5	−5	−5	−5	−5	−5	−6	−6
(United States) Poston	−6	−6	−6	−5	−4	−4	−5	−6	−6	−7	−6	−7	−7	−7	−7	−7	−6	−5
(Spain) Rahm	−6	−6	−6	−6	−6	−6	−6	−7	−7	−8	−9	−9	−9	−9	−9	−8	−6	−4

Cumulative tournament scores, relative to par

Birdie	Bogey	Double bogey	Triple bogey+
