= 2023 U.S. Open (golf) =

Tournament information
- Dates: June 15–18, 2023
- Location: Los Angeles, California; 34°4′8″N 118°25′23″W
- Courses: Los Angeles Country Club; North Course
- Organized by: USGA
- Tours: PGA Tour; European Tour; Japan Golf Tour

Statistics
- Par: 70
- Length: 7,423 yards (6,788 m)
- Field: 156 players, 65 after cut
- Cut: 142 (+2)
- Prize fund: $20,000,000
- Winner's share: $3,600,000

Champion
- (United States) Wyndham Clark
- 270 (−10)
- Location in the United States Location in California

The 2023 United States Open Championship was the 123rd U.S. Open, the national open golf championship of the United States. It was a 72-hole stroke play played from June 15–18 on the North Course of the Los Angeles Country Club in Los Angeles, California. It was the first U.S. Open to be played in Los Angeles since Riviera Country Club hosted the tournament in 1948.

Wyndham Clark, who had never finished better than 75th in a major championship and had missed the cut in his previous two U.S. Opens, shot a final-round 70 to finish at 10-under-par for the tournament and hold off four-time major champion Rory McIlroy by one shot for his first career U.S. Open and major championship.

Rickie Fowler and Xander Schauffele both broke the U.S. Open scoring record by shooting 62 (−8) in the first round. Fowler, who was tied with Clark for the lead at the start of the final round, ended up tied for fifth place, while Schauffele finished 10th.

== Course ==
On July 22, 2015, the United States Golf Association (USGA) announced that Los Angeles Country Club was selected to host the 123rd U.S. Open in June 2023. The USGA had made overtures to the club for at least 26 years. Los Angeles Country Club resisted the advances because its leaders valued the privacy of the club. A new group of leaders took over and wanted to show off a renovation of the club's courses done by Gil Hanse that made the courses resemble earlier versions of the courses. More than 90% of the club's members voted to approve the deal that brought the U.S. Open to Los Angeles Country Club.

The layout of the Los Angeles Country Club was criticized by several golfers, including 2017 and 2018 U.S. Open champion Brooks Koepka, reigning U.S. Open champion Matt Fitzpatrick, and eventual winner of the 2023 FedEx Cup Viktor Hovland. Fitzpatrick and Koepka both lamented the course's blind tee shots, high degree of slope and fairways that did not hold the ball. Fitzpatrick further elaborated that the slick fairways punished good tee shots which would end up rolling into the rough.

The layout of the Los Angeles Country Club limited the number of tickets and grandstand placement for spectators of the U.S. Open. The USGA allotted 22,000 total tickets for the event, with an estimated 8,000 available to the general public and the remainder going to corporate sponsors and club members. The proximity of the ninth green to the eighteenth green limited the placement of grandstands for the final green. The 22,000 tickets per day was below the 2022 total of 30,000 at The Country Club and well below the 50,000 per day at Oakmont Country Club in 2016. Fitzpatrick also criticized the USGA for the limited number of spectators stating he wished the tournament was louder.

Hole	1	2	3	4	5	6	7	8	9	Out	10	11	12	13	14	15	16	17	18	In	Total
Yards	590	497	419	228	480	330	284	537	171	3,536	409	290	380	507	623	124	542	520	492	3,887	7,423
Par	5	4	4	3	4	4	3	5	3	35	4	3	4	4	5	3	4	4	4	35	70

Yardage by round

Round	Hole	1	2	3	4	5	6	7	8	9	Out	10	11	12	13	14	15	16	17	18	In	Total
1st	Yards	594	485	403	223	473	315	258	537	184	3,472	367	254	374	502	628	124	529	520	482	3,780	7,252
2nd	Yards	581	490	420	221	493	315	299	535	168	3,522	418	297	369	522	605	115	555	530	490	3,901	7,423
3rd	Yards	594	485	422	192	455	313	277	526	179	3,443	392	273	384	518	627	81	558	515	491	3,839	7,282
Final	Yards	585	505	384	233	480	316	272	524	155	3,454	402	295	378	513	612	139	532	532	502	3,905	7,359

== Field ==
The field for the U.S. Open is made up of players who gain entry through qualifying events and those who are exempt from qualifying. The exemption criteria include provisions for recent major champions, winners of major amateur events, and leading players in the world rankings. Qualifying is in two stages, local and final, with some players being exempted through to final qualifying.

There were a record 10,187 entries received. There were 109 local qualifying events from which the leading players progressed to the 13 final qualifying events, nine of which were held in the United States on June 5.

== Round summaries ==
=== First round ===
Thursday, June 15, 2023

Rickie Fowler and Xander Schauffele finished tied for the lead after the first round; their rounds of 62 were the lowest rounds in U.S. Open history and matched the lowest round in any major, set by Branden Grace in the 2017 Open Championship.

There were several other scoring records. The first round field scoring average of 71.38 was almost a stroke lower than the previous low first round of 72.29 at Baltusrol Golf Club in 1993. The worst score of the day was 79—the first time either of the first two rounds of a U.S. Open had not seen a score in the 80s.

Place	Player	Score	To par
T1	(United States) Rickie Fowler	62	−8
T1	(United States) Xander Schauffele	62	−8
T3	(United States) Wyndham Clark	64	−6
T3	(United States) Dustin Johnson	64	−6
T5	(United States) Brian Harman	65	−5
T5	(Northern Ireland) Rory McIlroy	65	−5
T7	(France) Paul Barjon	67	−3
T7	(United States) Sam Bennett	67	−3
T7	(United States) Bryson DeChambeau	67	−3
T7	(United States) Harris English	67	−3
T7	(Canada) Mackenzie Hughes	67	−3
T7	(South Korea) Kim Si-woo	67	−3
T7	(United States) Scottie Scheffler	67	−3

=== Second round ===
Friday, June 16, 2023

Rickie Fowler made eight birdies along with six bogeys in a two-under round of 68 to take sole possession of the lead through 36 holes at 10-under for the tournament. Fowler's 18 birdies through the first two rounds was a new U.S. Open record and the most in any two-round stretch of a major championship in 30 years. His total of 130 tied Martin Kaymer in 2014 for the tournament record.

Wyndham Clark, beginning the round two shots off the lead, made three birdies on his first nine after beginning on the 10th, including holing a 44-foot putt on the 16th. At the par-5 14th hole, he hit his second shot into the rough surrounding the lip of a bunker but recovered on his third to 13 feet and made the putt for birdie. He was alone in the lead until a three-putt bogey on the par-3 fourth hole (his 14th) but rebounded with a birdie on the eighth to finish with a 68 (−2) and close within one shot of Fowler's lead.

Rory McIlroy, also teeing off on the 10th to begin his round, was two-over on his first nine before making six birdies on his second nine, including four over his last five holes. He shot 67 (−3) to move up to third place at eight-under, two behind Fowler.

The cut came at 142 (+2), with 65 players surviving to the weekend. Among the notables to miss the cut included 2013 champion Justin Rose, 2015 champion Jordan Spieth, and Phil Mickelson. Two-time major champion Justin Thomas shot an 81 to miss the cut by 12 shots.

Place	Player	Score	To par
1	(United States) Rickie Fowler	62-68=130	−10
2	(United States) Wyndham Clark	64-67=131	−9
T3	(Northern Ireland) Rory McIlroy	65-67=132	−8
T3	(United States) Xander Schauffele	62-70=132	−8
5	(United States) Harris English	67-66=133	−7
T6	(United States) Dustin Johnson	64-70=134	−6
T6	(Australia) Min Woo Lee	69-65=134	−6
T8	(United States) Sam Bennett	67-68=135	−5
T8	(United States) Scottie Scheffler	67-68=135	−5
10	(Australia) Cameron Smith	69-67=136	−4

=== Third round ===
Saturday, June 17, 2023

The USGA set up the par-3 15th hole to play at 81 yards for this round, making it the shortest hole in modern U.S. Open history. The previous shortest hole was the 7th hole at Pebble Beach, which played at 92 yards in the final round of the 2010 Open.

Rickie Fowler stood atop the leaderboard for the third consecutive round after shooting an even-par 70. Fowler was leading by one shot at 10-under on the 13th hole when he made a 69-foot birdie putt from just off the green to open a two-shot advantage. He then three-putted for bogey at the 18th to drop back into a share of the lead with Wyndham Clark after 54 holes.

Clark birdied two of his first three holes to take the outright lead before a bogey at the 11th dropped him back into a tie. At the 12th, his second shot flew into the rough over the green, where he failed to advance the ball on his third shot and suffered another bogey. Rebounding with a birdie at the 13th, Clark had to take a drop from an unplayable lie on the 17th hole and made another bogey to fall two back of Fowler playing the 18th. He then hit his approach to the 18th green to six feet and made the birdie to finish at 10-under after a one-under round of 69, tying Fowler for the lead.

Rory McIlroy, the 2011 champion, began the round two shots off the lead but made up the deficit with two birdies on the first three holes to tie. He then bogeyed the fourth hole and three-putted for bogey on the 13th before making birdie on the 14th to get to nine-under and a shot off the lead going into the final round.

Scottie Scheffler was one-over on his round before holing out from 196 yards on the 17th for an eagle. He then finished his round by making a 22-foot putt for birdie on the 18th to get to seven-under for the tournament and end up alone in fourth place.

Place	Player	Score	To par
T1	(United States) Wyndham Clark	64-67-69=200	−10
T1	(United States) Rickie Fowler	62-68-70=200	−10
3	(Northern Ireland) Rory McIlroy	65-67-69=201	−9
4	(United States) Scottie Scheffler	67-68-68=203	−7
5	(United States) Harris English	67-66-71=204	−6
T6	(United States) Dustin Johnson	64-70-71=205	−5
T6	(United States) Xander Schauffele	62-70-73=205	−5
8	(Japan) Ryutaro Nagano	71-67-68=206	−4
T9	(United States) Bryson DeChambeau	67-72-68=207	−3
T9	(South Korea) Tom Kim	73-68-66=207	−3
T9	(Australia) Cameron Smith	69-67-71=207	−3

=== Final round ===
Sunday, June 18, 2023

==== Summary ====
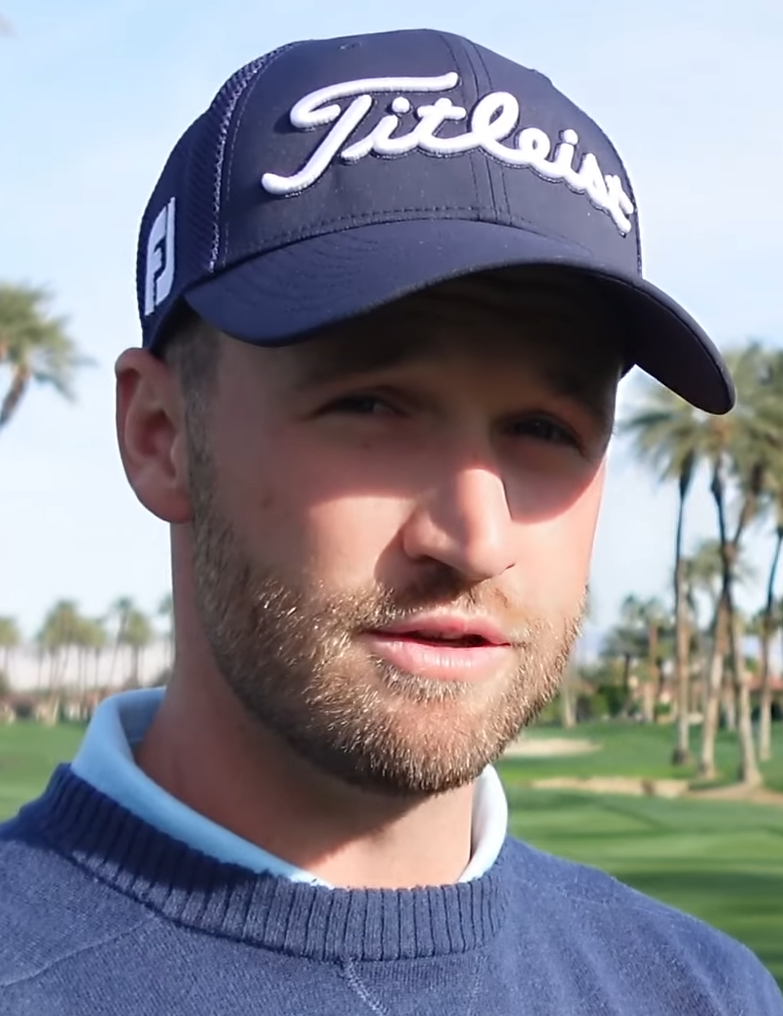
Wyndham Clark won his first U.S. Open title.

Wyndham Clark shot an even-par 70 to win his first career U.S. Open and major championship. Beginning the round tied with Rickie Fowler for the lead, he hit his approach shot on the par-3 fourth hole to five feet for a birdie to get to 11-under and take sole possession of the lead. He also birdied the par-4 sixth hole from the rough just short of the green, but at the eighth hole hit his second shot into the rough to the left of the green. He failed to advance the ball on his third shot and ended up with a bogey on the par-five.

With a two-shot lead playing the par-5 14th hole, Clark found the green in two shots and two-putted from 20 feet for a birdie to get to 12-under and open up a three-shot lead with four holes to play. He hit his tee shot on the par-3 15th over the green and failed to get up and down, settling for a bogey, then drove into a bunker on the 16th and had to chip back into the fairway. He missed a seven-footer for par to fall back to 10-under, but saved par from left of the green on the 17th. Now with a one-shot lead playing the 18th, Clark two-putted from 60 feet to win the tournament.

Rory McIlroy began the round a shot off the lead and opened with a birdie on the first hole to tie for the lead. This was his last birdie—he did not make another the rest of the round, and bogeyed the 14th after hitting his third shot into the ridge of a bunker and taking a drop for an embedded lie. He finished with 70 to end up at nine-under, a shot back of Clark.

Fowler, tied with Clark at the start of the round, made three bogeys over his first seven holes and did not make a birdie until the eighth, his first since the 13th hole in the third round. His birdie on the 14th was his 23rd of the tournament, establishing a new U.S. Open record. He shot a five-over 75 to fall back into a tie for fifth place with Tommy Fleetwood and Min Woo Lee.

Fleetwood, who began the round in 38th place, made two eagles and was eight-under through 14 holes before a bogey at the 16th. He missed a five-footer for birdie at the 18th for a 62 and settled for a seven-under 63, becoming the first player in U.S. Open history with two rounds of 63 or better (he also posted a seven-under 63 round at the 2018 U.S. Open).

==== Final leaderboard ====
Champion
Silver Cup winner (leading amateur)
(a) = amateur
(c) = past champion

Top 10
Place	Player	Score	To par	Money (US$)
1	(United States) Wyndham Clark	64-67-69-70=270	−10	3,600,000
2	(Northern Ireland) Rory McIlroy (c)	65-67-69-70=271	−9	2,160,000
3	(United States) Scottie Scheffler	67-68-68-70=273	−7	1,413,430
4	(Australia) Cameron Smith	69-67-71-67=274	−6	990,867
T5	(England) Tommy Fleetwood	73-69-70-63=275	−5	738,934
T5	(United States) Rickie Fowler	62-68-70-75=275	−5	738,934
T5	(Australia) Min Woo Lee	69-65-74-67=275	−5	738,934
T8	(United States) Harris English	67-66-71-72=276	−4	562,808
T8	(South Korea) Tom Kim	73-68-66-69=276	−4	562,808
T10	(United States) Austin Eckroat	71-68-73-65=277	−3	435,018
T10	(United States) Dustin Johnson (c)	64-70-71-72=277	−3	435,018
T10	(Spain) Jon Rahm (c)	69-73-70-65=277	−3	435,018
T10	(United States) Xander Schauffele	62-70-73-72=277	−3	435,018

Leaderboard below the top 10
Place	Player	Score	To par	Money ($)
T14	(United States) Patrick Cantlay	71-71-67-69=278	−2	332,343
T14	(United States) Russell Henley	71-71-68-68=278	−2	332,343
T14	(United States) Collin Morikawa	71-69-69-69=278	−2	332,343
T17	(England) Matt Fitzpatrick (c)	71-70-68-70=279	−1	284,167
T17	(United States) Brooks Koepka (c)	71-69-70-69=279	−1	284,167
19	(Norway) Viktor Hovland	69-70-69-72=280	E	258,662
T20	(United States) Bryson DeChambeau (c)	67-72-68-74=281	+1	241,659
T20	(United States) Nick Hardy	70-69-75-67=281	+1	241,659
T20	(Republic of Ireland) Shane Lowry	72-70-68-71=281	+1	241,659
T20	(United States) Denny McCarthy	71-67-73-70=281	+1	241,659
T20	(United States) Keith Mitchell	68-71-71-71=281	+1	241,659
T20	(Japan) Ryutaro Nagano	71-67-68-75=281	+1	241,659
T20	(England) Jordan Smith	70-71-74-66=281	+1	241,659
T27	(Spain) Sergio García	70-71-71-70=282	+2	199,805
T27	(Republic of Ireland) Pádraig Harrington	73-69-67-73=282	+2	199,805
T27	(England) Tyrrell Hatton	74-67-69-72=282	+2	199,805
T27	(United States) Justin Suh	69-69-72-72=282	+2	199,805
T27	(United States) Sahith Theegala	74-66-73-69=282	+2	199,805
T32	(United States) Sam Burns	69-70-71-73=283	+3	108,001
T32	(United States) Tony Finau	68-69-72-74=283	+3	108,001
T32	(Japan) Hideki Matsuyama	72-69-67-75=283	+3	108,001
T32	(Chile) Joaquín Niemann	68-72-70-73=283	+3	108,001
T32	(United States) Patrick Rodgers	71-69-71-72=283	+3	108,001
T32	(United States) Dylan Wu	68-70-73-72=283	+3	108,001
T32	(United States) Cameron Young	72-70-68-73=283	+3	108,001
T39	(United States) Eric Cole	69-70-71-74=284	+4	85,441
T39	(South Korea) Kim Si-woo	67-72-71-74=284	+4	85,441
T39	(Spain) David Puig	69-73-75-67=284	+4	85,441
T39	(United States) Gordon Sargent (a)	69-71-75-69=284	+4	0
T43	(United States) Sam Bennett	67-68-79-71=285	+5	66,532
T43	(New Zealand) Ryan Fox	68-74-69-74=285	+5	66,532
T43	(United States) Brian Harman	65-73-72-75=285	+5	66,532
T43	(United States) Billy Horschel	73-67-71-74=285	+5	66,532
T43	(United States) Andrew Putnam	68-71-73-73=285	+5	66,532
T43	(United States) Sam Stevens	75-67-70-73=285	+5	66,532
T49	(United States) Charley Hoffman	71-67-75-73=286	+6	49,224
T49	(Canada) Mackenzie Hughes	67-73-75-71=286	+6	49,224
T49	(Colombia) Sebastián Muñoz	68-74-72-72=286	+6	49,224
T49	(United States) Kevin Streelman	72-69-71-74=286	+6	49,224
T49	(United States) Gary Woodland (c)	70-68-73-75=286	+6	49,224
T54	(Mexico) Abraham Ancer	70-72-74-71=287	+7	45,270
T54	(France) Romain Langasque	71-68-77-71=287	+7	45,270
T56	(United States) Ryan Gerard	69-70-76-73=288	+8	44,420
T56	(United States) Patrick Reed	72-69-78-69=288	+8	44,420
58	(Japan) Yuto Katsuragawa	69-71-75-74=289	+9	43,783
59	(Canada) Adam Hadwin	70-72-74-75=291	+11	43,358
T60	(United States) Jacob Solomon	68-73-77-74=292	+12	42,720
T60	(Canada) Adam Svensson	71-70-77-74=292	+12	42,720
62	(United States) Ben Carr (a)	70-72-75-76=293	+13	0
63	(Japan) Ryo Ishikawa	69-73-78-74=294	+14	42,083
64	(South Africa) Aldrich Potgieter (a)	70-72-74-79=295	+15	0
65	(United States) Maxwell Moldovan (a)	71-71-76-79=297	+17	0
CUT	(France) Paul Barjon	67-76=143	+3	10,000 (Note: The $10,000 is unofficial money to all professionals. Travel expenses, including food, lodging and complimentary vehicles, were paid to amateur golfers.)
CUT	(United States) Patrick Cover	70-73=143	+3	10,000
CUT	(Colombia) Nico Echavarría	72-71=143	+3	10,000
CUT	(South Africa) Thriston Lawrence	70-73=143	+3	10,000
CUT	(Poland) Adrian Meronk	70-73=143	+3	10,000
CUT	(United States) Phil Mickelson	69-74=143	+3	10,000
CUT	(United States) Taylor Moore	71-72=143	+3	10,000
CUT	(United States) Kyle Mueller	76-67=143	+3	10,000
CUT	(Sweden) Alex Norén	68-75=143	+3	10,000
CUT	(Sweden) Vincent Norrman	70-73=143	+3	10,000
CUT	(Chile) Mito Pereira	71-72=143	+3	10,000
CUT	(United States) Jordan Spieth (c)	72-71=143	+3	10,000
CUT	(United States) Andrew Svoboda	70-73=143	+3	10,000
CUT	(United States) Davis Thompson	72-71=143	+3	10,000
CUT	(Canada) Corey Conners	70-74=144	+4	10,000
CUT	(Sweden) Simon Forsström	71-73=144	+4	10,000
CUT	(England) J. J. Grey	71-73=144	+4	10,000
CUT	(United States) Tom Hoge	72-72=144	+4	10,000
CUT	(United States) Max Homa	68-76=144	+4	10,000
CUT	(United States) Chris Kirk	71-73=144	+4	10,000
CUT	(Belgium) Thomas Pieters	71-73=144	+4	10,000
CUT	(Republic of Ireland) Séamus Power	72-72=144	+4	10,000
CUT	(England) Justin Rose (c)	76-68=144	+4	10,000
CUT	(United States) Adam Schenk	75-69=144	+4	10,000
CUT	(Austria) Sepp Straka	70-74=144	+4	10,000
CUT	(Canada) Nick Taylor	72-72=144	+4	10,000
CUT	(England) Barclay Brown (a)	71-74=145	+5	10,000
CUT	(United States) Stewart Cink	70-75=145	+5	10,000
CUT	(England) Ross Fisher	73-72=145	+5	10,000
CUT	(South Africa) Deon Germishuys	72-73=145	+5	10,000
CUT	(Argentina) Emiliano Grillo	74-71=145	+5	10,000
CUT	(Australia) Lucas Herbert	70-75=145	+5	10,000
CUT	(United States) Kurt Kitayama	75-70=145	+5	10,000
CUT	(United States) Mac Meissner	70-75=145	+5	10,000
CUT	(Italy) Francesco Molinari	72-73=145	+5	10,000
CUT	(South Africa) Wilco Nienaber	75-70=145	+5	10,000
CUT	(Canada) Taylor Pendrith	72-73=145	+5	10,000
CUT	(United States) J. T. Poston	74-71=145	+5	10,000
CUT	(Australia) Adam Scott	73-72=145	+5	10,000
CUT	(Canada) Roger Sloan	72-73=145	+5	10,000
CUT	(United States) Scott Stallings	71-74=145	+5	10,000
CUT	(United States) Austen Truslow	72-73=145	+5	10,000
CUT	(France) Bastien Amat (a)	73-73=146	+6	10,000
CUT	(United States) Keegan Bradley	72-74=146	+6	10,000
CUT	(United States) Brent Grant	72-74=146	+6	10,000
CUT	(United States) Jordan Gumberg	72-74=146	+6	10,000
CUT	(South Korea) Im Sung-jae	71-75=146	+6	10,000
CUT	(Germany) Martin Kaymer (c)	73-73=146	+6	10,000
CUT	(United States) Matt Kuchar	72-74=146	+6	10,000
CUT	(United States) Luke List	75-71=146	+6	10,000
CUT	(United States) Taylor Montgomery	71-75=146	+6	10,000
CUT	(United States) Preston Summerhays (a)	73-73=146	+6	10,000
CUT	(United States) Michael Thorbjornsen (a)	74-72=146	+6	10,000
CUT	(United States) Ryan Armour	74-73=147	+7	10,000
CUT	(United States) Olin Browne Jr.	75-72=147	+7	10,000
CUT	(Thailand) Gunn Charoenkul	73-74=147	+7	10,000
CUT	(Sweden) Jens Dantorp	74-73=147	+7	10,000
CUT	(Spain) Alejandro del Rey	68-79=147	+7	10,000
CUT	(United States) Michael Kim	74-73=147	+7	10,000
CUT	(Sweden) David Nyfjäll	73-74=147	+7	10,000
CUT	(United States) Corey Pereira	71-76=147	+7	10,000
CUT	(United States) Jesse Schutte	72-75=147	+7	10,000
CUT	(United States) Nick Dunlap (a)	77-71=148	+8	10,000
CUT	(Argentina) Mateo Fernández de Oliveira (a)	74-74=148	+8	10,000
CUT	(Spain) Pablo Larrazábal	71-77=148	+8	10,000
CUT	(South Korea) Lee Kyoung-hoon	73-75=148	+8	10,000
CUT	(United States) Michael Brennan (a)	74-75=149	+9	10,000
CUT	(United States) Christian Cavaliere (a)	72-77=149	+9	10,000
CUT	(Australia) Jason Day	73-76=149	+9	10,000
CUT	(China) Ding Wenyi (a)	72-77=149	+9	10,000
CUT	(United States) Paul Haley II	73-76=149	+9	10,000
CUT	(Mexico) Omar Morales (a)	71-78=149	+9	10,000
CUT	(Mexico) Carlos Ortiz	76-73=149	+9	10,000
CUT	(France) Matthieu Pavon	71-78=149	+9	10,000
CUT	(Australia) Karl Vilips (a)	74-75=149	+9	10,000
CUT	(United States) Berry Henson	74-76=150	+10	10,000
CUT	(United States) Aaron Wise	79-71=150	+10	10,000
CUT	(United States) Carson Young	74-76=150	+10	10,000
CUT	(United States) Hayden Buckley	77-74=151	+11	10,000
CUT	(United States) Frankie Capan III	78-73=151	+11	10,000
CUT	(Australia) Cameron Davis	72-79=151	+11	10,000
CUT	(Northern Ireland) Matthew McClean (a)	73-78=151	+11	10,000
CUT	(France) Victor Perez	76-75=151	+11	10,000
CUT	(United States) Alex Schaake	77-74=151	+11	10,000
CUT	(United States) Joel Dahmen	74-78=152	+12	10,000
CUT	(Hong Kong) Alex Yang (a)	79-74=153	+13	10,000
CUT	(United States) Isaac Simmons (a)	77-77=154	+14	10,000
CUT	(United States) Justin Thomas	73-81=154	+14	10,000
CUT	(England) David Horsey	77-79=156	+16	10,000
CUT	(United States) Brendan Valdes (a)	78-78=156	+16	10,000
CUT	(United States) Hank Lebioda	77-83=160	+20	10,000

==== Scorecard ====
Hole	1	2	3	4	5	6	7	8	9	10	11	12	13	14	15	16	17	18
Par	5	4	4	3	4	4	3	5	3	4	3	4	4	5	3	4	4	4
(United States) Clark	−11	−10	−10	−11	−11	−12	−12	−11	−11	−11	−11	−11	−11	−12	−11	−10	−10	−10
(Northern Ireland) McIlroy	−10	−10	−10	−10	−10	−10	−10	−10	−10	−10	−10	−10	−10	−9	−9	−9	−9	−9
(United States) Scheffler	−7	−7	−7	−7	−7	−7	−6	−7	−7	−7	−6	−5	−6	−6	−6	−7	−7	−7
(Australia) Smith	−3	−3	−3	−3	−3	−4	−3	−4	−3	−3	−4	−5	−5	−5	−6	−6	−6	−6
(England) Fleetwood	+2	+1	+1	+1	+1	−1	−1	−2	−3	−3	−4	−4	−4	−6	−6	−5	−5	−5
(United States) Fowler	−10	−9	−9	−9	−8	−8	−7	−8	−8	−8	−7	−6	−6	−7	−7	−6	−6	−5
(Australia) Lee	−2	−2	−3	−3	−3	−4	−4	−4	−4	−4	−4	−4	−4	−4	−5	−5	−5	−5
(United States) English	−6	−4	−4	−4	−3	−3	−3	−4	−4	−5	−5	−4	−4	−4	−4	−5	−4	−4
(South Korea) Kim	−4	−3	−3	−3	−3	−4	−3	−4	−4	−4	−5	−5	−5	−5	−5	−5	−3	−4

Cumulative tournament scores, relative to par

Eagle	Birdie	Bogey	Double bogey
