= 2026 U.S. Open =

2026 U.S. Open may refer to:

- 2026 U.S. Open (golf), a major golf tournament
- 2026 US Open (tennis), a grand slam tennis tournament
- 2026 U.S. Open Cup, a soccer tournament
- 2026 U.S. Open (badminton), a badminton tournament
