= 2026 U.S. Open (golf) =

Golf tournament

Tournament information
- Dates: June 18–21, 2026
- Location: Southampton, New York; 40.894°N 72.440°W
- Course: Shinnecock Hills Golf Club
- Organized by: USGA
- Tours: PGA Tour; European Tour; Japan Golf Tour

Statistics
- Field: 156 players, 72 after cut
- Cut: 144 (+4)
- Prize fund: $22,500,000
- Winner's share: $4,500,000

Champion
- (United States) Wyndham Clark
- 276 (−4)
- Location in the United States Location in New York

The 2026 United States Open Championship was the 126th edition of the U.S. Open, the national open golf championship of the United States. It was held from June 18–21, 2026 at Shinnecock Hills Golf Club in Southampton, New York. It was the sixth Open hosted at the club.

The prize pool was $22.5 million, which was an increase of $1 million compared to the 2025 edition. The winner's share also rose from $4.3 to $4.5 million. Wyndham Clark led wire-to-wire to claim his second U.S. Open title.

== Field ==
The field for the U.S. Open is made up of players who gain entry through qualifying events and also those who are exempt from qualifying. The exemption criteria include provisions for recent major champions, winners of major amateur events, and leading players in the world rankings. Qualifying is in two stages, local and final, with some players being exempted through to final qualifying.

=== Exemptions ===
This list details the exemption criteria for the 2026 U.S. Open and the players who qualified under them; any additional criteria under which players were exempt are indicated in parentheses. (Note: (a) – denotes amateur.)

1. Recent winners of the U.S. Open (2016–2025)

- Wyndham Clark
- Bryson DeChambeau (21)
- Matt Fitzpatrick (12,21)
- Dustin Johnson
- Brooks Koepka (7)
- Jon Rahm (2,6,21)
- J. J. Spaun (2,11,21)
- Gary Woodland (21)

2. The leading ten players, and those tying for tenth place, in the 2025 U.S. Open

- Sam Burns (11,21)
- Ben Griffin (11,21)
- Tyrrell Hatton (21)
- Russell Henley (11,21)
- Viktor Hovland (11,21)
- Robert MacIntyre (11,21)
- Carlos Ortiz
- Scottie Scheffler (6,7,8,9,11,12,21)
- Cameron Young (9,11,12,21)

3. The winner of the 2025 U.S. Senior Open

- Pádraig Harrington

4. The winner of the 2025 U.S. Amateur

- Mason Howell (a)

5. Winners of the 2025 U.S. Junior Amateur and U.S. Mid-Amateur, and the runner-up in the 2025 U.S. Amateur (Note: Players qualifying in this category must remain an amateur through the conclusion of the U.S. Open.)

- Hamilton Coleman (a)
- Jackson Herrington (a)
- Brandon Holtz (a)

6. Recent winners of the Masters Tournament (2022–2026)

- Rory McIlroy (9,11,21)

7. Recent winners of the PGA Championship (2022–2026)

- Aaron Rai (21)
- Xander Schauffele (8,21)
- Justin Thomas (11,21)

8. Recent winners of The Open Championship (2021–2025)

- Brian Harman (11,21)
- Collin Morikawa (11,21)
- Cameron Smith

9. Recent winners of The Players Championship (2024–2026)

10. The winner of the 2025 BMW PGA Championship

- Alex Norén (21)

11. All players who qualified and were eligible for the 2025 Tour Championship

- Ludvig Åberg (21)
- Akshay Bhatia (21)
- Keegan Bradley (21)
- Jacob Bridgeman (21)
- Patrick Cantlay (21)
- Corey Conners (21)
- Harris English (21)
- Tommy Fleetwood (21)
- Chris Gotterup (12,21)
- Harry Hall
- Im Sung-jae
- Shane Lowry (21)
- Hideki Matsuyama (21)
- Maverick McNealy (21)
- Andrew Novak (21)
- Justin Rose (12,21)
- Sepp Straka (21)
- Nick Taylor (21)

12. Winners of multiple PGA Tour events (Note: Events must carry full-point allocation towards the FedEx Cup.) from the 2025 U.S. Open to the start of the 2026 tournament

13. The top 5 players in the FedEx Cup standings as of May 18 who are not yet exempt

- Alex Fitzpatrick
- Patrick Rodgers
- Matti Schmid
- Sahith Theegala
- Sudarshan Yellamaraju

14. The top player on the 2025 Korn Ferry Tour points list

- Johnny Keefer

15. The top 2 players on the 2025 Race to Dubai who are not yet exempt as of May 18

- Laurie Canter
- Adrien Saddier

16. The top player on the 2026 Race to Dubai as of May 18 who is not yet exempt

- Jayden Schaper

17. The winner of the 2025 Amateur Championship

- Ethan Fang (a)

18. The winner of the Mark H. McCormack Medal in 2025

- Jackson Koivun (a)

19. The individual winner of the 2026 NCAA Division I Men's Golf Championship

- Preston Stout (a)

20. The winner of the 2026 Latin America Amateur Championship

- Mateo Pulcini (a)

21. The leading 60 players on the Official World Golf Ranking as of May 18

- Daniel Berger
- Michael Brennan
- Pierceson Coody
- Jason Day
- Nico Echavarría
- Rickie Fowler
- Ryan Fox
- Ryan Gerard
- Ryo Hisatsune
- Nicolai Højgaard
- Michael Kim
- Kim Si-woo
- Kurt Kitayama
- Jake Knapp
- Min Woo Lee
- Matt McCarty
- David Puig
- Patrick Reed
- Kristoffer Reitan
- Adam Scott
- Alex Smalley
- Jordan Spieth
- Sam Stevens
- Marco Penge did not play due to chronic health problems.

22. The leading 60 players on the Official World Golf Ranking if not otherwise exempt as of June 15

- Bud Cauley
- J. T. Poston

23. The top player from within the top 3 of the 2025 LIV Golf League individual standings who is not yet exempt as of May 18

- Joaquín Niemann

24. The top player from within the top 3 of the 2026 LIV Golf League individual standings as of May 18 who is not yet exempt

- Lucas Herbert

25. Special exemptions

=== Qualifiers ===
Date	Location	Venue	Field	Spots	Qualifiers (Note: (L) – denotes a player who progressed through local qualifying.)
May 18	Surrey, England	Walton Heath Golf Club (New and Old courses)	80	7	Filippo Celli, Ugo Coussaud, Ángel Hidalgo, Matthew Jordan, Nathan Kimsey, Niklas Nørgaard, Rocco Repetto
May 18	Dallas, Texas	Dallas Athletic Club (Blue and Gold courses)	123	9	Cooper Dossey, Adrien Dumont de Chassart, T. K. Kim (L), Tom Kim, Graeme McDowell, Manav Shah (L), Jimmy Stanger, Caleb Surratt, Peter Uihlein
May 25	Hino, Japan	Hino Golf Club	38	3	Ryuichi Oiwa, Kaito Onishi, Taihei Sato
Jun 8	Toronto, Ontario, Canada	Lambton Golf and Country Club	59	6	Emiliano Grillo, Max McGreevy, William Mouw, John Parry, Marcelo Rozo, Alejandro Tosti
Jun 8	Sacramento, California	Del Paso Country Club	77	4	Marek Fleming (a,L), Eric Lee (a), Taylor Montgomery, Matt Robles (a,L)
Jun 8	Palm Beach Gardens, Florida	BallenIsles Country Club	73	4	Ryder Cowan (a), Giuseppe Puebla (a,L), Miles Russell (a), Ben Silverman
Jun 8	Ball Ground, Georgia	Hawks Ridge Golf Club	77	5	Robbie Higgins (L), Chris Kirk, Chase Kyes (a,L), Keith Mitchell, Jake Peacock (L)
Jun 8	Rockville, Maryland	Woodmont Country Club	77	4	Ben Kohles, Logan Reilly (a,L), Jake Sollon (L), Jackson Suber
Jun 8	Purchase, New York	Century Country Club; Golf Club of Purchase	79	4	Max Greyserman, Ben James, James Nicholas, Kevin Roy
Jun 8	Gastonia, North Carolina	Gaston Country Club	63	5	Cole Hammer, Jackson Ormond (a,L), Jackson Van Paris (L), Brandon Wu, Yuan Yechun
Jun 8	Springfield, Ohio	Springfield Country Club	75	5	Zac Blair, Nick Hardy, Billy Horschel, Neal Shipley, Dylan Wu
Jun 8	Westerville, Ohio	Lakes Golf and Country Club	51	4	Vaughn Harber (a,L), J. B. Holmes, Árni Sveinsson (a), Davis Thompson
Jun 8	Creswell, Oregon	Emerald Valley Golf Club	54	2	Greyson Leach (L), Andrew Putnam

==== Alternates who gained entry ====
The following players gained a place in the field, having finished as the leading alternates in the specified final qualifying events:

- Chandler Phillips (Texas)
- Hennie du Plessis (England)
- Bryan Lee (a) (Maryland)
- Jack Schoenberger (L) (Georgia)
- Spencer Tibbits (L) (Oregon)
- Harry Higgs (North Carolina)

== Round summaries ==
=== First round ===
Thursday, June 18, 2026

Play started on time but after 30 minutes into it things got delayed by approximately two hours due to heavy morning fog, while strong winds throughout the day tested the field on the championship layout. The opening round was ultimately suspended due to darkness, leaving 50 players yet to complete their rounds.

2023 U.S. Open champion Wyndham Clark seized control of the opening round of the 126th U.S. Open at Shinnecock Hills Golf Club, setting the early pace with a six-under-par score through 16 holes before darkness suspended play. Clark took advantage of calmer late-afternoon conditions and produced a stretch of birdie-birdie-eagle to open a four-shot lead over the field.

A group of seven players sat four shots behind Clark at two-under par, including former U.S. Open champions Jon Rahm, Matt Fitzpatrick, Dustin Johnson and Gary Woodland. Sam Stevens and Max McGreevy shared the completed clubhouse lead after rounds of 68, while amateur Ryder Cowan matched the lowest opening round by an amateur at Shinnecock Hills with a two-under-par 68.

Masters champion Rory McIlroy briefly held a share of the lead during the afternoon before settling for a one-under-par 69 after finishing with back-to-back bogeys. Ludvig Åberg also opened with a 69 to sit five shots behind Clark.

Keith Mitchell set a new low-scoring record for the first nine holes at Shinnecock, completing it in 29 strokes with four birdies plus an eagle at the par-5 fifth hole. However, he had started on the 10th tee during the worst of the weather and played the back nine in 41 shots (four bogeys and a double on the 10th) to card an even-par 70.

Defending champion J. J. Spaun struggled in the difficult conditions and opened with a seven-over-par 77. World number one Scottie Scheffler, attempting to complete the Career Grand Slam, carded a two-over-par 72 after battling putting issues and several costly mistakes during his round.

Friday, June 19, 2026

Overnight leader Wyndham Clark completed his final two holes on Friday morning with pars to finish the opening round at six-under-par 64 and retain a two-shot lead.

Among the players returning to complete their opening rounds, Dustin Johnson and Gary Woodland produced the biggest moves up the leaderboard. Both former U.S. Open champions birdied enough of their remaining holes, reaching four-under-par 66, and three-under-par 67 respectively, moving into 2nd and 3rd place, two and three strokes behind Clark.

Amateur Ryder Cowan completed one of the standout rounds of the day, finishing with a two-under-par 68 to share fourth place. Cowan's score matched the lowest opening round by an amateur at Shinnecock Hills and left him firmly in contention entering the weekend.

Jon Rahm, Sam Stevens and qualifier Spencer Tibbits finished tied for fifth at two under par, while a group of nine players shared tenth place at one under. That group included Ludvig Åberg, Rory McIlroy, Max Greyserman, Brian Harman, Ben James, William Mouw, Max McGreevy, Corey Conners and Ángel Hidalgo.

The first round concluded with 18 players under par, highlighting the more receptive conditions that followed Thursday's fog delay despite the continuing challenge presented by Shinnecock Hills.

Place	Player	Score	To par
1	(United States) Wyndham Clark	64	−6
2	(United States) Dustin Johnson	66	−4
T3	(England) Matt Fitzpatrick	67	−3
T3	(United States) Gary Woodland	67	−3
T5	(United States) Ryder Cowan (a)	68	−2
T5	(United States) Max McGreevy	68	−2
T5	(Spain) Jon Rahm	68	−2
T5	(United States) Sam Stevens	68	−2
T5	(United States) Spencer Tibbits	68	−2
T10	(Sweden) Ludvig Åberg	69	−1
T10	(Canada) Corey Conners	69	−1
T10	(United States) Max Greyserman	69	−1
T10	(United States) Brian Harman	69	−1
T10	(Spain) Ángel Hidalgo	69	−1
T10	(United States) Ben James	69	−1
T10	(Northern Ireland) Rory McIlroy	69	−1

=== Second round ===
Friday, June 19, 2026

==== Summary ====
Place	Player	Score	To par
1	(United States) Wyndham Clark	64-69=133	−7
T2	(England) Matt Fitzpatrick	67-70=137	−3
T2	(South Korea) Tom Kim	70-67=137	−3
T2	(United States) Xander Schauffele	71-66=137	−3
T2	(United States) Sam Stevens	68-69=137	−3
6	(United States) Collin Morikawa	73-65=138	−2
T7	(United States) Sam Burns	71-68=139	−1
T7	(United States) Harry Higgs	71-68=139	−1
T7	(United States) Sahith Theegala	72-67=139	−1
T7	(United States) Justin Thomas	71-68=139	−1

=== Third round ===
Saturday, June 20, 2026

The third round (also known as "Moving Day") proved to be tricky at Shinnecock Hills, as only two players shot a round under par and most falling back. Wyndham Clark, the leader of the first and second round, shot an even round of 70 to maintain the lead, which was extended to six shots.

Scottie Scheffler, looking to complete the career Grand Slam, shot a one under 69 after chipping in at the 14th. He had reached two under for the tournament, but a bogey on the 17th dropped him back into a tie for second at one under with Tom Kim, Sam Stevens, and Sahith Theegala.

The only other player who shot under par was Emiliano Grillo, shooting a round of three under 67, which was the best round on Saturday, which moved him into a tie for sixth with Sam Burns, Keith Mitchell, and Xander Schauffele.

Place	Player	Score	To par
1	(United States) Wyndham Clark	64-69-70=203	−7
T2	(South Korea) Tom Kim	70-67-72=209	−1
T2	(United States) Scottie Scheffler	72-68-69=209	−1
T2	(United States) Sam Stevens	68-69-72=209	−1
T2	(United States) Sahith Theegala	72-67-70=209	−1
T6	(United States) Sam Burns	71-68-71=210	E
T6	(Argentina) Emiliano Grillo	73-70-67=210	E
T6	(United States) Keith Mitchell	70-70-70=210	E
T6	(United States) Xander Schauffele	71-66-73=210	E
T10	(England) Matt Fitzpatrick	67-70-74=211	+1
T10	(England) Tommy Fleetwood	70-71-70=211	+1
T10	(United States) Collin Morikawa	73-65-73=211	+1

=== Final round ===
Sunday, June 21, 2026

==== Summary ====
Wyndham Clark, holding a six-shot lead overnight, shot a three over 73 to finish at four under par and win the U.S. Open by one stroke over Sam Burns. Clark became the first wire-to-wire U.S. Open champion since Martin Kaymer in 2014 and won his second U.S. Open, following his 2023 victory at Los Angeles Country Club.

Sam Burns, seven shots behind Clark at the start of the round, shot a three under 67 to finish at three under par. Burns reduced Clark's lead to one shot during the round, but a three-putt bogey on the 15th and missed birdie putts on the 17th and 18th left him one shot short.

Tom Kim shot an even-par 70 to finish third at one under. J.T. Poston, Keith Mitchell and Scottie Scheffler shared fourth at even par. Scheffler, who started the day tied for second, was unable to complete the career Grand Slam.

Clark's decisive moment came at the par-five 16th. After his drive found trouble, he recovered to the green and holed a 30-foot birdie putt to move two shots ahead with two holes remaining. He bogeyed the 17th before making two putts from just outside 50 feet on the 18th for par and the one-shot victory.

==== Final leaderboard ====
Champion
Silver Cup winners (leading amateurs)
(c) = past champion

Top 10
Place	Player	Score	To par	Money (US$)
1	(United States) Wyndham Clark (c)	64-69-70-73=276	−4	4,500,000
2	(United States) Sam Burns	71-68-71-67=277	−3	2,430,000
3	(South Korea) Tom Kim	70-67-72-70=279	−1	1,532,530
T4	(United States) Keith Mitchell	70-70-70-70=280	E	920,882
T4	(United States) J. T. Poston	71-71-71-67=280	E	920,882
T4	(United States) Scottie Scheffler	72-68-69-71=280	E	920,882
T7	(England) Tyrrell Hatton	74-68-72-67=281	+1	617,090
T7	(Chile) Joaquín Niemann	78-65-72-66=281	+1	617,090
T7	(United States) Sam Stevens	68-69-72-72=281	+1	617,090
T7	(United States) Gary Woodland (c)	67-73-73-68=281	+1	617,090

Leaderboard below the top 10
Place	Player	Score	To par	Money ($)
T11	(England) Tommy Fleetwood	70-71-70-71=282	+2	405,862
T11	(England) John Parry	71-71-71-69=282	+2	405,862
T11	(England) Aaron Rai	74-67-72-69=282	+2	405,862
T11	(England) Justin Rose (c)	71-70-73-68=282	+2	405,862
T11	(United States) Xander Schauffele	71-66-73-72=282	+2	405,862
T11	(United States) Sahith Theegala	72-67-70-73=282	+2	405,862
T17	(Sweden) Ludvig Åberg	69-72-76-66=283	+3	280,966
T17	(United States) Akshay Bhatia	70-70-73-70=283	+3	280,966
T17	(United States) Ben Griffin	72-70-71-69=283	+3	280,966
T17	(United States) Collin Morikawa	73-65-73-72=283	+3	280,966
T17	(United States) Justin Thomas	71-68-75-69=283	+3	280,966
22	(England) Matt Fitzpatrick (c)	67-70-74-73=284	+4	230,220
T23	(Canada) Corey Conners	69-72-71-73=285	+5	181,101
T23	(United States) Pierceson Coody	72-71-71-71=285	+5	181,101
T23	(United States) Ryder Cowan (a)	68-72-72-73=285	+5	10,000 (Note: Unofficial prize money offered by USGA Rules of Amateur Status where amateur golfers are entitled to compensation by the USGA as the organizer of the tournament. A player may be remunerated for all entry fees to all rounds of qualifying, transportation to the qualifying rounds and the main tournament, lodging, and all related costs. In addition, the USGA is permitted to pay the player under NIL rules.)
T23	(England) Alex Fitzpatrick	71-69-72-73=285	+5	181,101
T23	(New Zealand) Ryan Fox	70-73-74-68=285	+5	181,101
T23	(Argentina) Emiliano Grillo	73-70-67-75=285	+5	181,101
T23	(United States) Ben James	69-72-77-67=285	+5	181,101
T23	(United States) Ben Kohles	70-71-74-70=285	+5	181,101
T23	(United States) Jackson Koivun (a)	72-71-74-68=285	+5	10,000
T32	(United States) Zac Blair	71-70-72-73=286	+6	128,756
T32	(United States) Keegan Bradley	70-71-71-74=286	+6	128,756
T32	(United States) Brian Harman	69-71-73-73=286	+6	128,756
T32	(United States) Dustin Johnson (c)	66-77-71-72=286	+6	128,756
T32	(United States) Max McGreevy	68-73-73-72=286	+6	128,756
T32	(Northern Ireland) Rory McIlroy (c)	69-71-73-73=286	+6	128,756
T32	(United States) Maverick McNealy	72-68-73-73=286	+6	128,756
T39	(United States) Jacob Bridgeman	73-71-74-69=287	+7	101,859
T39	(United States) Johnny Keefer	71-70-76-70=287	+7	101,859
T39	(Scotland) Robert MacIntyre	70-74-73-70=287	+7	101,859
T39	(United States) Miles Russell (a)	72-71-74-70=287	+7	10,000
T43	(United States) Michael Brennan	72-71-73-72=288	+8	72,592
T43	(England) Laurie Canter	72-72-71-73=288	+8	72,592
T43	(United States) Chris Gotterup	75-69-73-71=288	+8	72,592
T43	(United States) Max Greyserman	69-73-76-70=288	+8	72,592
T43	(United States) Harry Higgs	71-68-77-72=288	+8	72,592
T43	(Japan) Ryo Hisatsune	71-69-73-74=288	+8	72,592
T43	(South Korea) Im Sung-jae	74-68-71-75=288	+8	72,592
T43	(United States) Michael Kim	71-72-70-75=288	+8	72,592
T43	(Denmark) Niklas Nørgaard	71-70-73-74=288	+8	72,592
T43	(United States) Cameron Young	72-70-73-73=288	+8	72,592
T53	(Belgium) Adrien Dumont de Chassart	71-71-77-70=289	+9	51,467
T53	(Spain) Ángel Hidalgo	69-74-74-72=289	+9	51,467
T53	(United States) Kurt Kitayama	74-68-76-71=289	+9	51,467
T56	(United States) Bud Cauley	72-72-72-74=290	+10	48,625
T56	(Colombia) Nico Echavarría	71-73-75-71=290	+10	48,625
T56	(United States) Marek Fleming (a)	72-72-74-72=290	+10	10,000
T56	(United States) Jordan Spieth (c)	73-70-73-74=290	+10	48,625
T56	(United States) Peter Uihlein	74-79-80-66=290	+10	48,625
T61	(United States) Spencer Tibbits	68-74-76-73=291	+11	47,242
T61	(United States) Jackson Van Paris	70-72-76-73=291	+11	47,242
T63	(United States) Eric Lee (a)	74-70-78-71=293	+13	10,000
T63	(United States) Caleb Surratt	75-69-75-74=293	+13	46,551
T65	(United States) Russell Henley	70-73-80-71=294	+14	44,938
T65	(Japan) Hideki Matsuyama	71-73-77-73=294	+14	44,938
T65	(United States) William Mouw	70-70-74-80=294	+14	44,938
T65	(United States) James Nicholas	71-72-82-69=294	+14	44,938
T65	(United States) Andrew Putnam	74-68-74-78=294	+14	44,938
T65	(United States) Neal Shipley	71-73-77-73=294	+14	44,938
71	(United States) Patrick Rodgers	72-71-80-74=297	+17	43,324
72	(United States) Dylan Wu	73-71-82-72=298	+18	42,858
CUT	(Italy) Filippo Celli	75-70=145	+5	10,000 (Note: Unofficial prize money offered by the USGA for making the U. S. Open as fees for qualifying and traveling to the tournament, paid to both professionals and amateurs, which are governed by rules allowing compensation by the USGA as the organizer of the tournament, under rules permitting remuneration for all entry fees to all rounds of qualifying, transportation to the qualifying rounds and the main tournament, lodging, and all related costs, and NIL rules.)
CUT	(United States) Bryson DeChambeau (c)	70-75=145	+5	10,000
CUT	(United States) Harris English	72-73=145	+5	10,000
CUT	(United States) Rickie Fowler	71-74=145	+5	10,000
CUT	(United States) Ryan Gerard	73-72=145	+5	10,000
CUT	(United States) Billy Horschel	73-72=145	+5	10,000
CUT	(Norway) Viktor Hovland	76-69=145	+5	10,000
CUT	(England) Matthew Jordan	72-73=145	+5	10,000
CUT	(United States) Andrew Novak	73-72=145	+5	10,000
CUT	(United States) Patrick Reed	72-73=145	+5	10,000
CUT	(United States) Jackson Suber	74-71=145	+5	10,000
CUT	(Canada) Nick Taylor	74-71=145	+5	10,000
CUT	(Canada) Sudarshan Yellamaraju	73-72=145	+5	10,000
CUT	(United States) Patrick Cantlay	74-72=146	+6	10,000
CUT	(United States) Cole Hammer	73-73=146	+6	10,000
CUT	(Australia) Lucas Herbert	74-72=146	+6	10,000
CUT	(South Korea) Kim Si-woo	77-69=146	+6	10,000
CUT	(England) Nathan Kimsey	76-70=146	+6	10,000
CUT	(Republic of Ireland) Shane Lowry	73-73=146	+6	10,000
CUT	(Sweden) Alex Norén	74-72=146	+6	10,000
CUT	(Mexico) Carlos Ortiz	72-74=146	+6	10,000
CUT	(Spain) Jon Rahm (c)	68-78=146	+6	10,000
CUT	(Norway) Kristoffer Reitan	70-76=146	+6	10,000
CUT	(United States) Jack Schoenberger	73-73=146	+6	10,000
CUT	(Australia) Cameron Smith	75-71=146	+6	10,000
CUT	(United States) Bryan Lee (a)	73-74=147	+7	10,000
CUT	(Australia) Min Woo Lee	74-73=147	+7	10,000
CUT	(Japan) Kaito Onishi	77-70=147	+7	10,000
CUT	(United States) Giuseppe Puebla (a)	74-73=147	+7	10,000
CUT	(France) Adrien Saddier	72-75=147	+7	10,000
CUT	(United States) Manav Shah	73-74=147	+7	10,000
CUT	(United States) Jimmy Stanger	74-73=147	+7	10,000
CUT	(Austria) Sepp Straka	72-75=147	+7	10,000
CUT	(United States) Brandon Wu	78-69=147	+7	10,000
CUT	(United States) Mason Howell (a)	78-70=148	+8	10,000
CUT	(United States) Jake Knapp	77-71=148	+8	10,000
CUT	(Colombia) Marcelo Rozo	74-74=148	+8	10,000
CUT	(Australia) Adam Scott	73-75=148	+8	10,000
CUT	(Canada) Ben Silverman	74-74=148	+8	10,000
CUT	(United States) J. J. Spaun (c)	77-71=148	+8	10,000
CUT	(Argentina) Alejandro Tosti	78-70=148	+8	10,000
CUT	(France) Ugo Coussaud	76-73=149	+9	10,000
CUT	(United States) Jackson Herrington (a)	75-74=149	+9	10,000
CUT	(Denmark) Nicolai Højgaard	74-75=149	+9	10,000
CUT	(United States) J. B. Holmes	75-74=149	+9	10,000
CUT	(United States) Chris Kirk	78-71=149	+9	10,000
CUT	(United States) Chandler Phillips	74-75=149	+9	10,000
CUT	(Spain) David Puig	77-72=149	+9	10,000
CUT	(United States) Kevin Roy	72-77=149	+9	10,000
CUT	(Japan) Taihei Sato	75-74=149	+9	10,000
CUT	(United States) Alex Smalley	76-73=149	+9	10,000
CUT	(United States) Preston Stout (a)	72-77=149	+9	10,000
CUT	(China) Yuan Yechun	77-72=149	+9	10,000
CUT	(United States) Daniel Berger	77-73=150	+10	10,000
CUT	(United States) Brandon Holtz (a)	76-74=150	+10	10,000
CUT	(United States) Brooks Koepka (c)	73-77=150	+10	10,000
CUT	(Japan) Ryuichi Oiwa	78-72=150	+10	10,000
CUT	(South Africa) Jayden Schaper	75-75=150	+10	10,000
CUT	(United States) Davis Thompson	74-76=150	+10	10,000
CUT	(United States) Hamilton Coleman (a)	81-70=151	+11	10,000
CUT	(United States) Cooper Dossey	79-72=151	+11	10,000
CUT	(United States) Ethan Fang (a)	74-77=151	+11	10,000
CUT	(England) Harry Hall	74-77=151	+11	10,000
CUT	(Republic of Ireland) Pádraig Harrington	77-74=151	+11	10,000
CUT	(United States) Taylor Montgomery	77-74=151	+11	10,000
CUT	(United States) Jake Peacock	76-75=151	+11	10,000
CUT	(Argentina) Mateo Pulcini (a)	74-77=151	+11	10,000
CUT	(United States) Logan Reilly (a)	79-72=151	+11	10,000
CUT	(South Africa) Hennie du Plessis	76-76=152	+12	10,000
CUT	(United States) Vaughn Harber (a)	75-77=152	+12	10,000
CUT	(United States) Nick Hardy	79-73=152	+12	10,000
CUT	(United States) Chase Kayes (a)	75-77=152	+12	10,000
CUT	(United States) Matt McCarty	72-80=152	+12	10,000
CUT	(Northern Ireland) Graeme McDowell (c)	76-76=152	+12	10,000
CUT	(United States) Jake Sollon	81-72=153	+13	10,000
CUT	(Germany) Matti Schmid	77-77=154	+14	10,000
CUT	(United States) T. K. Kim	79-77=156	+16	10,000
CUT	(United States) Matthew Robles (a)	77-79=156	+16	10,000
CUT	(Spain) Rocco Repetto	81-76=157	+17	10,000
CUT	(United States) Robbie Higgins	82-77=159	+19	10,000
CUT	(United States) Jackson Ormond (a)	80-80=160	+20	10,000
CUT	(United States) Greyson Leach	79-82=161	+21	10,000
CUT	(Iceland) Árni Sveinsson (a)	84-77=161	+21	10,000
WD	(Australia) Jason Day	–		10,000

==== Scorecard ====
Hole	1	2	3	4	5	6	7	8	9	10	11	12	13	14	15	16	17	18
Par	4	3	4	4	5	4	3	4	4	4	3	4	4	4	4	5	3	4
(United States) Clark	−7	−6	−6	−6	−5	−5	−4	−4	−4	−5	−5	−5	−4	−4	−4	−5	−4	−4
(United States) Burns	−1	−1	−2	−2	−3	−3	−3	−4	−3	−3	−3	−3	−3	−3	−2	−3	−3	−3
(South Korea) Kim	E	E	−1	E	E	E	E	−1	−1	E	−1	−1	−1	−1	−1	−2	−1	−1
(United States) Mitchell	E	E	E	E	−1	−1	−1	−1	−1	E	−1	−1	−1	−1	−1	−1	E	E
(United States) Poston	+3	+4	+4	+4	+3	+3	+2	+1	E	+1	E	−1	−1	−1	−1	−1	E	E
(United States) Scheffler	E	E	E	E	−1	−1	E	E	E	−1	−1	−1	−1	E	E	E	E	E

Cumulative tournament scores, relative to par

Eagle	Birdie	Bogey	Double bogey
