= J. T. Poston =

American professional golfer (born 1993)

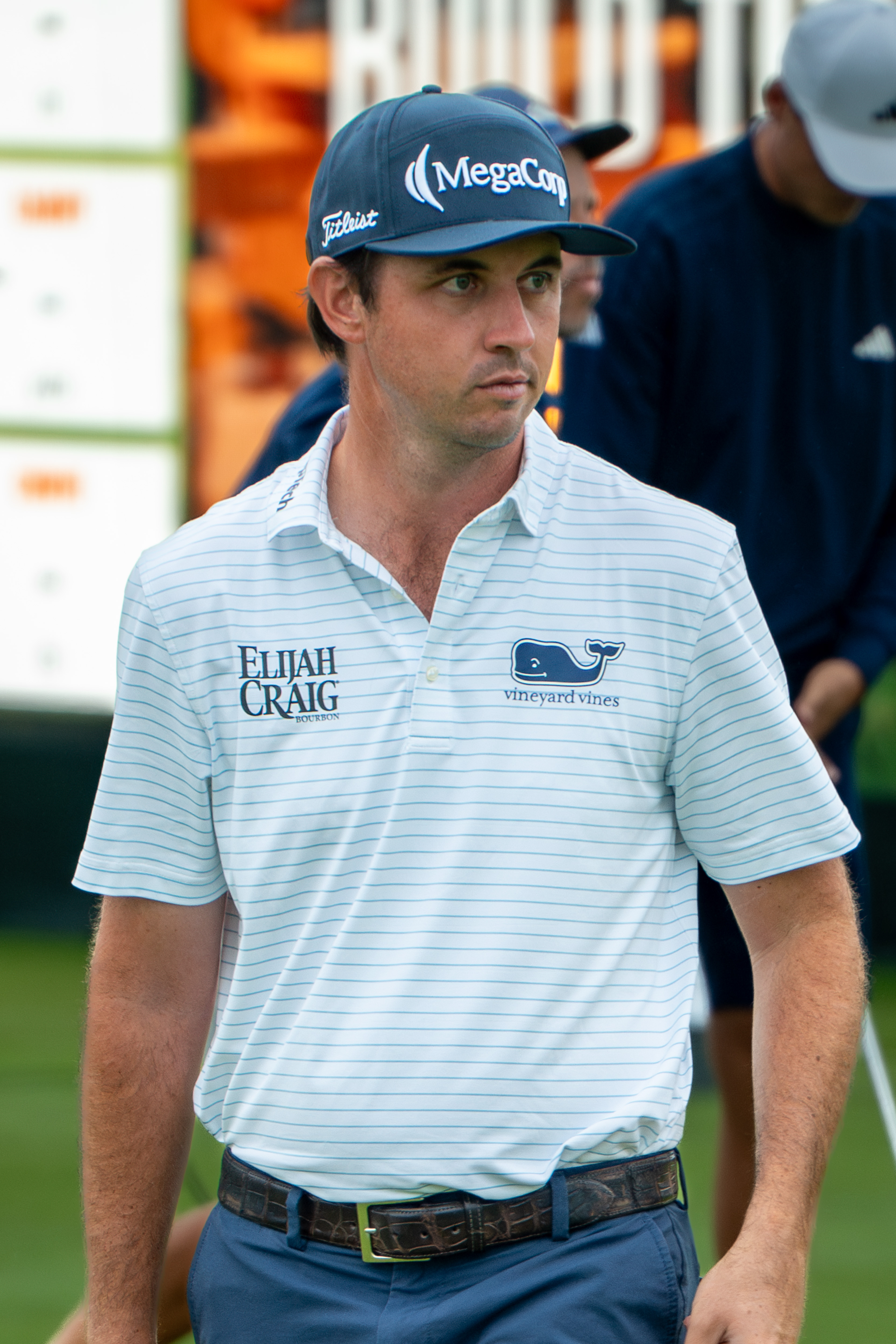
- Poston in 2026

Personal information
- Full name: James Tyree Poston
- Nickname: The Postman
- Nationality: United States
- Born: June 1, 1993 (age 33) Hickory, North Carolina, U.S.
- Height: 6 ft 1 in (1.85 m)
- Weight: 165 lb (75 kg; 11.8 st)

Career
- Sport: Golf
- College: Western Carolina University
- Turned professional: 2015
- Current tour: PGA Tour
- Former tour: Web.com Tour
- Professional wins: 4
- Highest ranking: 32 (June 21, 2026) (as of October 25, 2026)

Number of wins by tour
- PGA Tour: 4

Best results in major championships
- Masters Tournament: T30: 2024
- PGA Championship: T5: 2025
- U.S. Open: T4: 2026
- The Open Championship: T41: 2023

James Tyree Poston (born June 1, 1993) is an American professional golfer on the PGA Tour, where he is a four-time winner, most notably winning the 50th annual Memorial Tournament in Dublin, Ohio.

== Early life ==
Poston attended Hickory High School in Hickory, North Carolina, where he shot a North Carolina High School Athletic Association (NCHSAA) golf tournament record 63 his senior year in 2011. He won two NCHSAA 3A individual state titles and one team state title. In college, Poston competed for Western Carolina University where he won six times, including two consecutive Southern Conference titles.

== Professional career ==
After starting 2016 with no status on any tour, Poston Monday qualified for the United Leasing Championship on the Web.com Tour and finished T23. His finish earned him entry into the Rex Hospital Open, where a tie for third earned him Special Temporary Member status for the season. Five more top 15s, including two second-place finishes, resulted in Poston finishing 10th on the regular-season money list and earning a 2017 PGA Tour card.

On August 4, 2019, Poston earned his first professional victory by winning the Wyndham Championship, after shooting an 8-under 62 in the final round and going bogey-free in the tournament. He became the first player since 1974 to win a PGA Tour event while going bogey-free.

On July 3, 2022, Poston won the John Deere Classic by three strokes over Christiaan Bezuidenhout and Emiliano Grillo. Poston led after each round of the tournament, becoming the first player since 1992 to win the tournament wire-to-wire. This win also secured him a spot in the 2022 Open Championship.

On October 21, 2024, Poston won the Shriners Children's Open, which was his third PGA Tour title.

On June 7, 2026, Poston won the Memorial Tournament in a playoff over Ryan Gerard. This helped Poston qualify for the 2026 U.S. Open, a tournament he was not a guaranteed participant in when the season started.

== Amateur wins ==
- 2011 Trusted Choice Big I National Championship
- 2013 Southwestern Amateur, Golfweek Program Challenge, Cardinal Intercollegiate, Hummingbird Intercollegiate
- 2014 SoCon Championship
- 2015 Wexford Plantation Intercollegiate, SoCon Championship

== Professional wins (4) ==
=== PGA Tour wins (4) ===
Legend
Signature events (1)
Other PGA Tour (3)

No.	Date	Tournament	Winning score	To par	Margin of victory	Runner(s)-up
1	Aug 4, 2019	Wyndham Championship	65-65-66-62=258	−22	1 stroke	(United States) Webb Simpson
2	Jul 3, 2022	John Deere Classic	62-65-67-69=263	−21	3 strokes	(South Africa) Christiaan Bezuidenhout, (Argentina) Emiliano Grillo
3	Oct 20, 2024	Shriners Children's Open	64-65-66-67=262	−22	1 stroke	(United States) Doug Ghim
4	Jun 7, 2026	Memorial Tournament	70-65-69-72=276	−12	Playoff	(United States) Ryan Gerard

PGA Tour playoff record (1–1)

No.	Year	Tournament	Opponent	Result
1	2021	Barbasol Championship	(Republic of Ireland) Séamus Power	Lost to par on sixth extra hole
2	2026	Memorial Tournament	(United States) Ryan Gerard	Won with par on second extra hole

== Playoff record ==
Korn Ferry Tour playoff record (0–1)

No.	Year	Tournament	Opponents	Result
1	2016	Digital Ally Open	(United States) Wesley Bryan, (United States) Grayson Murray	Bryan won with birdie on second extra hole

== Results in major championships ==
Results not in chronological order in 2020.

Tournament	2017	2018
Masters Tournament		
U.S. Open	CUT	
The Open Championship		
PGA Championship		

Tournament	2019	2020	2021	2022	2023	2024	2025	2026
Masters Tournament		CUT			T34	T30	T42	
PGA Championship	T60	T75	CUT		T40	CUT	T5	CUT
U.S. Open		CUT	T40		CUT	T32	T33	T4
The Open Championship		NT		CUT	T41	CUT	CUT	CUT

Top 10
Did not play

CUT = missed the half-way cut
"T" = tied
NT = no tournament due to COVID-19 pandemic

=== Summary ===
Tournament	Wins	2nd	3rd	Top-5	Top-10	Top-25	Events	Cuts made
Masters Tournament	0	0	0	0	0	0	4	3
PGA Championship	0	0	0	1	1	1	7	4
U.S. Open	0	0	0	1	1	1	7	4
The Open Championship	0	0	0	0	0	0	5	1
Totals	0	0	0	2	2	2	23	12

- Most consecutive cuts made – 3 (2025 Masters – 2025 U.S. Open)
- Longest streak of top-10s – 1 (twice)

== Results in The Players Championship ==
Tournament	2019	2020	2021	2022	2023	2024	2025	2026
The Players Championship	T22	C	T22	CUT	CUT	T45	T33	T50

"T" indicates a tie for a place
CUT = missed the halfway cut
C = canceled after the first round due to the COVID-19 pandemic

== Results in World Golf Championships ==
Tournament	2019	2020	2021	2022	2023
Championship					
Match Play		NT^{1}	T28		R16
Invitational		T30			
Champions	T24	NT^{1}	NT^{1}	NT^{1}	

^{1}Cancelled due to COVID-19 pandemic

Top 10
Did not play

NT = No tournament
"T" = tied
QF, R16, R32, R64 = Round in which player lost in match play
Note that the Championship and Invitational were discontinued from 2022. The Champions was discontinued from 2023.

== PGA Tour career summary ==
Season	Starts	Cuts made	Wins	2nd	3rd	Top-10	Top-25	Best finish	Earnings ($)	Money list rank
2017	28	20	0	0	0	1	4	10	662,565	142
2018	22	14	0	0	0	2	6	4	940,661	120
2019	29	21	1	0	0	3	9	1	2,461,215	38
2020	23	16	0	0	0	2	6	8	1,282,929	68
2021	29	15	0	1	1	2	6	2	1,663,521	77
2022	30	15	1	1	1	4	10	1	3,292,443	31
2023	31	21	0	1	1	8	14	2	3,699,409	39
2024	25	20	1	0	0	4	6	10	5,271,598	19
2025	26	22	0	0	0	1	2	9	3,233,502	53
Career*	243	163	3	3	3	26	63	20	22,507,843	88

* As of the 2025 season.

== See also ==
- 2016 Web.com Tour Finals graduates
