= Wyndham Clark =

American professional golfer (born 1993)

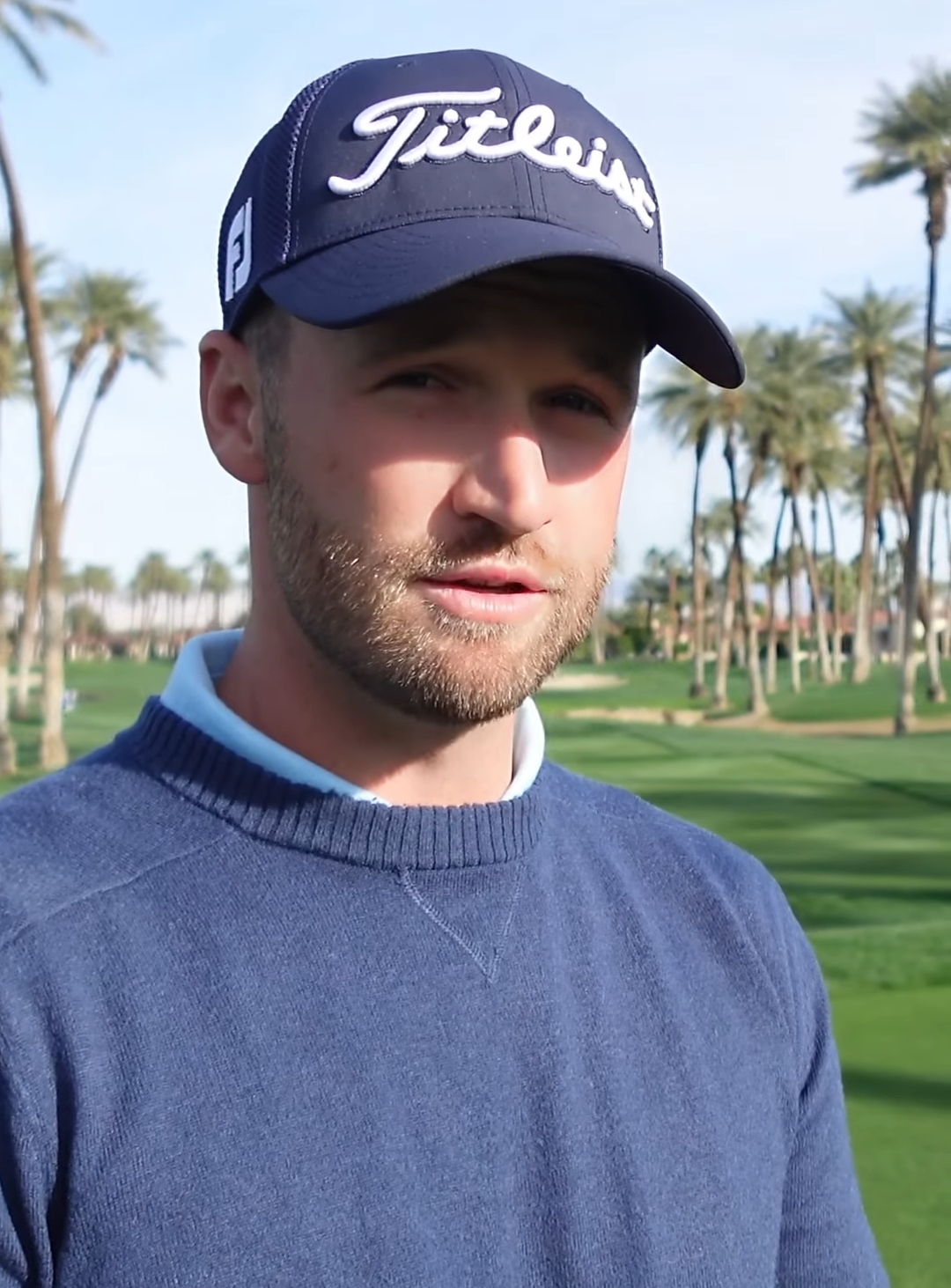
- Clark in 2023

Personal information
- Full name: Wyndham Robert Clark
- Nicknames: Dub, Blow Pig
- Nationality: United States
- Born: December 9, 1993 (age 32) Denver, Colorado, U.S.
- Height: 6 ft 0 in (183 cm)
- Weight: 172 lb (78 kg)

Career
- Sport: Golf
- College: Oklahoma State University; University of Oregon
- Turned professional: 2017
- Current tour: PGA Tour
- Former tour: Web.com Tour
- Professional wins: 6
- Highest ranking: 3 (April 21, 2024) (as of October 25, 2026)

Number of wins by tour
- PGA Tour: 6
- European Tour: 2

Best results in major championships (wins: 2)
- Masters Tournament: T21: 2026
- PGA Championship: T50: 2025
- U.S. Open: Won: 2023, 2026
- The Open Championship: T4: 2025

Wyndham Robert Clark (born December 9, 1993) is an American professional golfer who plays on the PGA Tour. He has won two major championships, the 2023 and 2026 U.S. Opens.

After playing collegiately for the Oklahoma State Cowboys and the Oregon Ducks, Clark turned professional in 2017 and earned PGA Tour membership in 2018 through the Web.com Tour. He had a breakout year in 2023; he won his first PGA Tour title at the Wells Fargo Championship in May and his first major championship at the U.S. Open the following month. Clark added his second major at the 2026 U.S Open.

== Early life ==
Clark was born in Denver, Colorado, on December 9, 1993, to Lise (née Thevenet) and Randall Clark. He is the middle child of three siblings. His parents married in 1989, at Riviera Country Club. After competing in Miss USA 1981, Lise moved to Los Angeles to pursue an acting career and later became a national sales director for Mary Kay Cosmetics. Randall was a talented tennis player whose professional career was derailed by injuries, and he later worked on Wall Street.

At age three, Clark was introduced to golf by his mother, who sought to use the game as an outlet for his energy. He practiced at Cherry Hills Country Club while growing up. Clark's father discouraged him from playing video games and told him that he would not receive a PlayStation until he made an eagle, at a time when he had not yet made better than par. Clark accomplished the feat at age six, making a hole in one with driver on a 125-yard (114 m) par-3 at Keystone Ranch in Colorado.

Clark attended Valor Christian High School in Highlands Ranch, Colorado, where he was two years ahead of future NFL player Christian McCaffrey. In 2010, Clark won the Colorado Stroke Play Championship. Aged 16, he was the youngest to win the title since Bob Byman in 1971. In high school, Clark twice won the Colorado Class 4A State Championship, including an eight-shot victory in 2011 at Pelican Lakes, where he shot rounds of 64-64. He also played on Valor Christian's basketball team for two years. Clark finished tied-second at the Junior Invitational in April 2012, and was ranked No. 25 in the nation by the American Junior Golf Association in May 2012.

== Collegiate career ==
Clark received a scholarship to play collegiate golf at Oklahoma State University (OSU), beginning in the fall of 2012. During his freshman season with the Oklahoma State Cowboys, he was informed that his mother had been diagnosed with breast cancer. Clark subsequently dealt with grief, which affected him on and off the course. OSU coach Mike McGraw persuaded Clark to redshirt the season and seek counseling. McGraw recalled that Clark had told him: "I'm a burden to the team. I can't handle any of this." Clark said in 2023 that he was grateful for McGraw as redshirting allowed him to spend more time with his mother, who died at age 55 in August 2013.

As a redshirt freshman, Clark recorded eight top-6 finishes in eleven starts and was named the 2014 Big 12 Player of the Year. Regarding the strong results despite his mother's death, he recalled: "I had a year where I was just kind of numb and didn’t think about it. I was almost emotionless, and I was playing good golf." Clark struggled in his redshirt sophomore and junior seasons, and by the time of the 2016 NCAA regional he had been dropped from OSU's five-man lineup. He said in 2023: "When I started playing bad golf, that’s when the shit hit the fan. I was so lost. I hated golf. ... I had so much anger that I had lost my mom and that my family was in such disarray." OSU coach Alan Bratton said Clark was a "confident but extremely self-critical player".

Clark transferred as a redshirt senior to the University of Oregon, where he was coached by Casey Martin. He replaced Aaron Wise, who had left Oregon to turn professional in June 2016. Martin described Clark as a "freakishly long" driver and praised his short game. In his debut for the Oregon Ducks, he finished runner-up at the Nike Collegiate Golf Invitational in October 2016.

Clark won his first individual collegiate title in January 2017, at the Arizona Intercollegiate. He claimed co-medalist honors at the Wyoming Desert Intercollegiate in February, alongside Oregon teammate Norman Xiong. Clark won his third individual title of the year at the Pac-12 Conference Championship in April. He helped the Oregon Ducks reach the final of the 2017 NCAA Division I men's golf championship, where they were defeated by the Oklahoma Sooners. Clark had a 70.05 stroke average for the 2016–17 season and ranked first in the nation for par-5 scoring (4.46). He was a finalist for the 2017 Ben Hogan Award alongside Maverick McNealy and Dylan Meyer, and was named as a first-team All-American, as well as the 2017 Pac-12 Player of the Year. Clark graduated with a business degree in 2017.

== Professional career ==
=== 2017–2022: Early years ===
Clark made his debut on the PGA Tour in June 2017, as a sponsor exemption at the Travelers Championship. He shot rounds of 78-74 to miss the cut. His best finish of 2017 came at the Sanderson Farms Championship, where he finished 17th. He subsequently placed tied-23rd at qualifying school for the Web.com Tour, which earned him status for the 2018 Web.com Tour season. In April 2018, Clark finished runner-up at the United Leasing & Finance Championship, one stroke behind José de Jesús Rodríguez. In total, Clark made 24 starts during the season, including four top-10 finishes. By finishing 16th on the Web.com Tour money list, he earned promotion to the PGA Tour.

Clark held the lead at the Honda Classic in March 2019 after 54 holes. He shot a final-round 72 to finish tied-seventh. Clark finished second at the Bermuda Championship in November 2020, losing in a playoff to PGA Tour veteran Brian Gay. Clark struggled during his early years to maintain his PGA Tour status and was ranked at 268th in the Official World Golf Ranking in March 2022.

=== 2023: Breakthrough season, U.S. Open victory ===
In May 2023, Clark recorded his first PGA Tour victory at the Wells Fargo Championship. He totaled 19-under 265 to beat Xander Schauffele by four shots. The win came in his 134th start on the tour. Clark said: "It's been a long five years to get to this point on tour. I thought I would have had one earlier, but it's well worth the wait." Prior to the tournament, Clark had recorded top-6 finishes in three of his previous five starts. The victory vaulted him from 80th to 31st in the Official World Golf Ranking. He also received $3.6 million in prize money for the win; his previous career-high payout was $485,000 at the WM Phoenix Open in February 2023.

At the 2023 U.S. Open held at Los Angeles Country Club in June, Clark opened with rounds of 64-67 to move into contention. He carded a third-round 69 to position himself atop the leaderboard alongside Rickie Fowler. Clark shot an even-par 70 in the final round to win by one stroke ahead of Rory McIlroy and claim his first major championship title. The win came in Clark's seventh career major start; his previous best finish was a tie for 75th. With the victory, he received $3.6 million and moved to 13th in the Official World Golf Ranking.

Clark shot a final-round 65 at the Tour Championship in August to finish third and earn $5 million in FedEx Cup prize money. Clark was an automatic qualifier for the United States team in the 2023 Ryder Cup, held at Marco Simone Golf and Country Club northeast of Rome, Italy. He went 1–1–1, including a loss in his singles match to Robert MacIntyre, as the U.S. was defeated by Europe 16 1/2 to 11 1/2.

=== 2024: Continued success ===
In February 2024, Clark shot a course-record and career-low round of 60 at Pebble Beach on his way to winning the AT&T Pebble Beach Pro-Am by one stroke over Ludvig Åberg. The tournament was called after 54 holes due to inclement weather.

Clark finished runner-up at the Arnold Palmer Invitational in March 2024, five strokes behind world number one Scottie Scheffler. The following week, Clark finished tied-second at the 2024 Players Championship. He missed a birdie putt on the final hole to enter a playoff for the title against Scheffler. Clark said: "I don't know how that putt doesn't go in. Even when it kind of lipped, I thought it would lip in." In April 2024, Clark rose to a career-high of third in the Official World Golf Ranking.

Clark qualified as one of four Americans in the men's individual tournament at the 2024 Summer Olympics, held in August at Le Golf National near Paris. After opening with a 75, he rebounded with rounds of 68-65-65 to finish tied-14th. Clark was an automatic qualifier for the United States team at the 2024 Presidents Cup, held in Canada in September. He had a 1–2–1 record, including a tie in his singles match against Min Woo Lee, as the United States defeated the International team by a score of 18 1/2–11 1/2. Clark was inducted to the Colorado Golf Hall of Fame in December 2024.

=== 2025: Downturn in form, Oakmont ban ===
After missing the cut at the 2025 U.S. Open held at Oakmont Country Club, Clark damaged a locker in the Oakmont locker room. The following month, Oakmont announced that Clark had been banned from the property. The decision came after discussion between the USGA and Oakmont board. The ban would be lifted if Clark compensated Oakmont for damages, made a sizable contribution to a charity of the board's choice, and enrolled in counseling and/or anger management therapy. Clark said in response: "I'm doing anything I can to try to remedy the situation. Obviously it's a no-brainer to pay for the damages. That was a given. ... But I want to show them who I really am with the apology and the things I'm going to do."

At the 2025 Open Championship, Clark opened with a 76, but rallied with rounds of 66-66-65 to finish tied-fourth. This was his first top-20 finish at a major since the 2023 U.S. Open; he had missed the cut in four of his previous eight major starts.

Having ended 2024 at 7th in the Official World Golf Ranking, Clark dropped to 33rd by November 2025. In an interview with Golfweek that month, Clark said he was disappointed that he had failed to qualify for the 2025 Ryder Cup and commented that, during the season, "I started spiraling a little bit mentally and my swing got off". He also reflected on the Oakmont incident, stating: "I did something I regret. I brought it upon myself. Any negative press was self-induced and probably deserved. ... I feel like I matured a lot this year. You learn so much more in bad years than you do in good years."

=== 2026: Second major title ===
In March 2026, Clark split with John Ellis, who had been his caddie for the previous eight years. Clark stated: "It's been kind of a tough last year of golf and we both mutually were like, alright, let's just take a little break and reassess maybe later."

Clark claimed his fourth PGA Tour title in May 2026 at the CJ Cup Byron Nelson. He shot an 11-under 60 in the final round to win by three strokes over Si Woo Kim. Clark's total of 30-under 254 was one behind the PGA Tour 72-hole scoring record of 253. With the win, he moved from 75th to 44th in the Official World Golf Ranking.

At the 2026 U.S. Open held at Shinnecock Hills Golf Club in June, Clark took the first-round lead with a 6-under 64. He stretched his lead to six shots at 7-under 203 after a third-round 70. This was the largest 54-hole lead at a U.S. Open since Rory McIlroy's eight-stroke advantage in 2011. Clark shot a 73 in the final round to win by one stroke over Sam Burns. This made him the first wire-to-wire winner of the U.S. Open since Martin Kaymer in 2014. Clark received $4.5 million in prize money for his victory, and rose from 34th to 8th in the Official World Golf Ranking.

In August, Clark won the BMW Championship for his third win of the PGA Tour season. He opened the tournament with back-to-back rounds of 6-under 64. In round three, he shot a 5-under 65 to take a five shot lead. in the final round, Clark struggled, bogeying the 1st, 6th, and 10th holes. After 11 holes, he shared the lead with Rory McIlroy. Clark birdied the final three holes to win by three shots over Patrick Cantlay.

== Personal life ==
Clark is a Christian. As of 2023, he resides in Scottsdale, Arizona, which is home to numerous professional golfers.

In January 2023, Clark began working with sports psychologist Julie Elion, who had coached golfers such as Phil Mickelson and Jimmy Walker. Clark said in 2024 that Elion had improved his mental approach towards golf, and that he had benefited from meditation, praying, and journaling.

Clark founded the Play Big Foundation in memory of his mother. Before her death in 2013, she advised Clark to "play big". Through his foundation, Clark donated $80,000 to the Colorado Breast Cancer Awareness Foundation in October 2024.

== Amateur wins ==
- 2009 Colorado Class 4A State Championship
- 2010 Colorado Stroke Play
- 2011 Colorado Class 4A State Championship
- 2017 Arizona Intercollegiate, Wyoming Desert Intercollegiate, Pac-12 Championship

== Professional wins (6) ==
=== PGA Tour wins (6) ===
Legend
Major championships (2)
FedEx Cup playoff events (1)
Signature events (2)
Other PGA Tour (1)

| No. | Date | Tournament | Winning score | To par | Margin of victory | Runner-up |
|---|---|---|---|---|---|---|
| 1 | May 7, 2023 | Wells Fargo Championship | 67-67-63-68=265 | −19 | 4 strokes | (United States) Xander Schauffele |
| 2 | Jun 18, 2023 | U.S. Open | 64-67-69-70=270 | −10 | 1 stroke | (Northern Ireland) Rory McIlroy |
| 3 | Feb 4, 2024 | AT&T Pebble Beach Pro-Am | 72-67-60=199 (Note: Shortened to 54 holes due to weather.) | −17 | 1 stroke | (Sweden) Ludvig Åberg |
| 4 | May 24, 2026 | CJ Cup Byron Nelson | 66-63-65-60=254 | −30 | 3 strokes | (South Korea) Kim Si-woo |
| 5 | Jun 21, 2026 | U.S. Open (2) | 64-69-70-73=276 | −4 | 1 stroke | (United States) Sam Burns |
| 6 | Aug 23, 2026 | BMW Championship | 64-64-65-70=263 | −17 | 3 strokes | (United States) Patrick Cantlay |

PGA Tour playoff record (0–1)

| No. | Year | Tournament | Opponent | Result |
|---|---|---|---|---|
| 1 | 2020 | Bermuda Championship | (United States) Brian Gay | Lost to birdie on first extra hole |

== Major championships ==
=== Wins (2) ===
| Year | Championship | 54 holes | Winning score | Margin | Runner-up |
|---|---|---|---|---|---|
| 2023 | U.S. Open | Tied for lead | −10 (64-67-69-70=270) | 1 stroke | (Northern Ireland) Rory McIlroy |
| 2026 | U.S. Open (2) | 6 stroke lead | −4 (64-69-70-73=276) | 1 stroke | (United States) Sam Burns |

=== Results timeline ===
Results not in chronological order in 2020.

| Tournament | 2020 | 2021 | 2022 | 2023 | 2024 | 2025 | 2026 |
|---|---|---|---|---|---|---|---|
| Masters Tournament | | | | | CUT | T46 | T21 |
| PGA Championship | CUT | T75 | | CUT | CUT | T50 | CUT |
| U.S. Open | | CUT | CUT | 1 | T56 | CUT | 1 |
| The Open Championship | NT | | T76 | T33 | CUT | T4 | CUT |

Win
Top 10
Did not play

CUT = missed the half-way cut
"T" = tied
NT = no tournament due to COVID-19 pandemic

=== Summary ===
| Tournament | Wins | 2nd | 3rd | Top-5 | Top-10 | Top-25 | Events | Cuts made |
|---|---|---|---|---|---|---|---|---|
| Masters Tournament | 0 | 0 | 0 | 0 | 0 | 1 | 3 | 2 |
| PGA Championship | 0 | 0 | 0 | 0 | 0 | 0 | 6 | 2 |
| U.S. Open | 2 | 0 | 0 | 2 | 2 | 2 | 6 | 3 |
| The Open Championship | 0 | 0 | 0 | 1 | 1 | 1 | 5 | 3 |
| Totals | 2 | 0 | 0 | 3 | 3 | 4 | 20 | 10 |

- Most consecutive cuts made – 2 (three times)
- Longest streak of top-10s – 1 (three times)

== Results in The Players Championship ==
| Tournament | 2019 | 2020 | 2021 | 2022 | 2023 | 2024 | 2025 | 2026 |
|---|---|---|---|---|---|---|---|---|
| The Players Championship | DQ | C | CUT | CUT | T27 | T2 | WD | T42 |

Top 10

CUT = missed the halfway cut
DQ = disqualified
WD = withdrew
"T" indicates a tie for a place
C = canceled after the first round due to the COVID-19 pandemic

== U.S. national team appearances ==
Amateur

- Palmer Cup: 2014

Professional

- Ryder Cup: 2023
- Presidents Cup: 2024 (winners), 2026 (winners)

== See also ==
- 2018 Web.com Tour Finals graduates
