= Keith Mitchell (golfer) =

American professional golfer (born 1992)

Personal information
- Full name: Keith McKendree Mitchell
- Nickname: Cashmere Keith
- Nationality: United States
- Born: January 7, 1992 (age 34) Chattanooga, Tennessee, U.S.
- Height: 6 ft 1 in (1.85 m)
- Weight: 185 lb (84 kg; 13.2 st)

Career
- Sport: Golf
- College: University of Georgia
- Turned professional: 2014
- Current tour: PGA Tour
- Former tours: Web.com Tour; PGA Tour Latinoamérica
- Professional wins: 1
- Highest ranking: 44 (February 19, 2023) (as of October 25, 2026)

Number of wins by tour
- PGA Tour: 1

Best results in major championships
- Masters Tournament: T43: 2019
- PGA Championship: T34: 2022
- U.S. Open: T4: 2026
- The Open Championship: CUT: 2019, 2021, 2022, 2026

Keith McKendree Mitchell (born January 7, 1992) is an American professional golfer on the PGA Tour.

== Early life and college career ==
Mitchell was born on January 7, 1992, in Chattanooga, Tennessee and attended the Baylor School there. He played college golf from 2011 through 2014 at the University of Georgia, where he majored in Business and Real Estate.

== Professional career ==
=== 2015 season ===
Mitchell played on the PGA Tour Latinoamérica in 2015 where his best finish was runner-up at the Brazil Open; he had four other top-ten finishes. He earned $44,295 in 14 starts on that tour.

=== 2016–2017 seasons ===
Mitchell played on the Web.com Tour in 2016 and 2017. He began with a sponsor's invite to the 2016 Panama Claro Championship, where he finished 14th.

Mitchell played well enough in the 2017 Web.com Tour Finals to earn his PGA Tour card for 2018. His best finish on that tour, that year, was third at the 2017 News Sentinel Open. He also finished with a tie for 11th at a PGA event in March 2017, the Valspar Championship, earning $144,900.

=== 2018 season ===
Mitchell finished runner-up at the 2018 Corales Puntacana Resort and Club Championship on the PGA Tour. He ranked No. 7 on the PGA tour in strokes gained off-the-tee, which measures player performance off the tee on all par 4s and par 5s, and was ranked No. 10 Mitchell for average driving distance, at 312.6 yards.

=== 2019 season ===
On March 3, 2019, Mitchell got his first professional victory at The Honda Classic in Palm Beach Gardens, Florida. Sinking a 15-foot (4.6 m) birdie putt on the final hole, he won by one stroke, avoiding a playoff with runners-up Rickie Fowler and Brooks Koepka. In Mitchell's previous four events, he had made only one cut, 73rd at the Phoenix Open. The win moved him up 93 places in the world rankings, from 161 to 68.

=== 2022 season ===
For the 2022 season, Mitchell had six top-ten finishes, a career high. He played in 26 tournaments, making the cut in 20 of them. His best result of the season was a tie for third at The CJ Cup.

When asked in June 2022 about a potential $20 million payout to join LIV Golf, Mitchell said "No chance". "If the LIV tour was such a good model, guys would go for free or for a lot less," Mitchell said.

== Professional wins (1) ==
=== PGA Tour wins (1) ===
No.	Date	Tournament	Winning score	To par	Margin of victory	Runners-up
1	Mar 3, 2019	The Honda Classic	68-66-70-67=271	−9	1 stroke	(United States) Rickie Fowler, (United States) Brooks Koepka

== Results in major championships ==
Results not in chronological order in 2020.

Tournament	2019	2020	2021	2022	2023	2024	2025	2026
Masters Tournament	T43				53			
PGA Championship	CUT	T43		T34	T58	CUT	CUT	T65
U.S. Open	CUT				T20			T4
The Open Championship	CUT	NT	CUT	CUT				CUT

Did not play

CUT = missed the half-way cut
"T" = tied
NT = no tournament due to COVID-19 pandemic

=== Summary ===
Tournament	Wins	2nd	3rd	Top-5	Top-10	Top-25	Events	Cuts made
Masters Tournament	0	0	0	0	0	0	2	2
PGA Championship	0	0	0	0	0	0	7	4
U.S. Open	0	0	0	1	1	2	3	2
The Open Championship	0	0	0	0	0	0	4	0
Totals	0	0	0	1	1	2	16	8

- Most consecutive cuts made – 3 (2023 Masters – 2023 U.S. Open)
- Longest streak of top-10s – 1 (once)

== Results in The Players Championship ==
Tournament	2018	2019	2020	2021	2022	2023	2024	2025	2026
The Players Championship	T77	T47	C	CUT	T13	T35	73	CUT	T46

CUT = missed the halfway cut
"T" indicates a tie for a place
C = canceled after the first round due to the COVID-19 pandemic

== Results in World Golf Championships ==
Tournament	2019	2020	2021	2022	2023
Championship					
Match Play	T40			T26	T52
Invitational	39				
Champions		NT^{1}	NT^{1}	NT^{1}	

^{1}Cancelled due to COVID-19 pandemic

Did not play

QF, R16, R32, R64 = Round in which player lost in match play
NT = No tournament
"T" = Tied
Note that the Championship and Invitational were discontinued from 2022. The Champions was discontinued from 2023.

== See also ==
- 2017 Web.com Tour Finals graduates
