= Michael Kim (golfer) =

American professional golfer (born 1993)

Personal information
- Full name: Michael Sangwon Kim
- Nationality: United States
- Born: July 14, 1993 (age 33) Seoul, South Korea
- Height: 5 ft 11 in (1.80 m)
- Weight: 165 lb (75 kg; 11.8 st)

Career
- Sport: Golf
- College: University of California, Berkeley
- Turned professional: 2013
- Current tour: PGA Tour
- Former tours: European Tour; Korn Ferry Tour
- Professional wins: 2
- Highest ranking: 35 (November 16, 2025) (as of October 25, 2026)

Number of wins by tour
- PGA Tour: 1
- European Tour: 1

Best results in major championships
- Masters Tournament: T27: 2025
- PGA Championship: T44: 2026
- U.S. Open: T17: 2013
- The Open Championship: T35: 2018

Achievements and awards
- Haskins Award: 2013

Michael Sangwon Kim (born July 14, 1993) is an American professional golfer with one PGA Tour victory and one European Tour victory.

== Early life and amateur career ==
Kim is the son of Sun and Yun Kim. He was born in Seoul, South Korea but raised in San Diego, California and went to Torrey Pines High School.

Kim attended the University of California, Berkeley, where he was teammates with Max Homa. In April 2013, Kim was Pac-12 Men's Golfer of the Month.

On June 2, 2013, he became the first Cal men's golfer to ever win national player of the year honors when he was named by the Golf Coaches Association of America as the Division I recipient of the 2013 Jack Nicklaus Award.

On June 11, 2013, Kim won the Haskins Award, which is given to the national player of the year in men's college golf and selected by voting from players, coaches and members of the national media.

Kim qualified for the 2013 U.S. Open by being co-medalist at his sectional qualifier. After the third round, Kim was tied for 10th. He finished tied for 17th and was the low amateur.

== Professional career ==
Kim turned professional in December 2013. He had limited status on the 2014 Web.com Tour after finishing T-56 at the Web.com Tour Qualifying Tournament. He played in 17 events, making the cut in eleven with the best finish of T-2 at the Price Cutter Charity Championship.

Kim played on the Web.com Tour again in 2015 based on his finish in the Web.com Tour Finals. He finished 13th on the money list in the 2015 Web.com Tour, earning a full-time membership to the PGA Tour for 2016.

Kim has been a full-time member of the PGA Tour since 2016, and won his first PGA Tour event at the 2018 John Deere Classic by eight shots, setting the Tournament scoring record. In the process, he earned the final invitation to the 2018 Open Championship.

Kim missed 19 cuts in 20 events on the PGA Tour in 2019 and, as of August 26, 2019, fell to 502nd in the Official World Golf Ranking.

In the 2020–21 PGA Tour season, Kim made only nine cuts in thirty starts and finished 214th in the 2021 FedEx Cup. He lost his full PGA Tour Card. In 2021–22, Kim returned to the Korn Ferry Tour and regained his PGA Tour card for the 2022–23 PGA Tour season.

He finished T2 at the 2025 WM Phoenix Open.

Kim won his first European Tour event at the FedEx Open de France in September 2025. He became the first American to win the tournament since Barry Jaeckel in 1972.

In July 2026, Kim shot a 59 during the second round of the 3M Open, which was the 16th sub-60 round in PGA Tour history.

== Awards and honors ==
- In April 2013, Kim was named the Pac-12 Men's Golfer of the Month.
- In 2013, the Golf Coaches Association of America bestowed the Jack Nicklaus Award to him
- In 2013, Kim won the Haskins Award, bestowed to the top college golfer of the year

== Professional wins (2) ==
=== PGA Tour wins (1) ===
No.	Date	Tournament	Winning score	To par	Margin of victory	Runners-up
1	Jul 15, 2018	John Deere Classic	63-64-64-66=257	−27	8 strokes	(United States) Bronson Burgoon, (United States) Joel Dahmen, (Italy) Francesco Molinari, (United States) Sam Ryder

=== European Tour wins (1) ===
No.	Date	Tournament	Winning score	To par	Margin of victory	Runners-up
1	Sep 21, 2025	FedEx Open de France	69-68-66-65=268	−16	1 stroke	(France) Jeong-Weon Ko, (Australia) Elvis Smylie

== Results in major championships ==
Tournament	2013	2014	2015	2016	2017	2018
Masters Tournament						
U.S. Open	T17LA					
The Open Championship						T35
PGA Championship						CUT

Tournament	2019	2020	2021	2022	2023	2024	2025	2026
Masters Tournament	CUT						T27	CUT
PGA Championship	CUT						T55	T44
U.S. Open					CUT		T50	T43
The Open Championship		NT			CUT		CUT	CUT

Did not play

LA = low amateur
CUT = missed the half-way cut
"T" = tied
NT = no tournament due to the COVID-19 pandemic

=== Summary ===
Tournament	Wins	2nd	3rd	Top-5	Top-10	Top-25	Events	Cuts made
Masters Tournament	0	0	0	0	0	0	3	1
PGA Championship	0	0	0	0	0	0	4	2
U.S. Open	0	0	0	0	0	1	4	3
The Open Championship	0	0	0	0	0	0	4	1
Totals	0	0	0	0	0	1	15	7

- Most consecutive cuts made – 3 (2025 Masters – 2025 U.S. Open)
- Longest streak of top-10s – none

== Results in The Players Championship ==
Tournament	2025	2026
The Players Championship	CUT	CUT

CUT = missed the half-way cut

== U.S. national team appearances ==
Amateur

- Palmer Cup: 2013 (winners)
- Walker Cup: 2013 (winners)

== See also ==
- 2015 Web.com Tour Finals graduates
- 2022 Korn Ferry Tour Finals graduates
