= 2024 Open Championship field =

This page lists the criteria used to determine the field for the 2024 Open Championship and the players who qualified.

The Open Championship field is made up of 157 players, who gained entry through various exemption criteria and qualifying tournaments. The criteria included past Open champions, recent major winners, top ranked players in the world rankings and from the leading world tours, and winners and high finishers from various designated tournaments, including the Open Qualifying Series; the winners of designated amateur events, including The Amateur Championship and U.S. Amateur, also gained exemption provided they remain an amateur. Anyone not qualifying via exemption, and had a handicap of 0.4 or lower, can gain entry through regional and final qualifying events.

Most exemption criteria remained unchanged from previous years. The previous Order of Merit exemptions for the Asian Tour, Japan Golf Tour, PGA Tour of Australasia, and Sunshine Tour were replaced by a category based on the Official World Golf Ranking's International Federation Ranking List, and a new exemption was added for the winner of the Africa Amateur Championship; it was also announced that winners of the 2024 Open and future editions will remain exempt through age 55, instead of through age 60 as with previous winners.

== Criteria and exemptions ==
Each player is classified according to the first category in which he qualified, but other categories are shown in parentheses.

1. The Open Champions aged 60 or under on 21 July 2024 (for all Champions up to 2024)

- Stewart Cink
- Darren Clarke
- John Daly
- Ernie Els
- Todd Hamilton
- Brian Harman (3,4,5,13)
- Pádraig Harrington
- Zach Johnson (3)
- Justin Leonard
- Shane Lowry (3,5,7)
- Rory McIlroy (3,4,5,6,13)
- Phil Mickelson (3,11)
- Francesco Molinari (3)
- Collin Morikawa (3,5,11,13)
- Louis Oosthuizen
- Cameron Smith (3,12)
- Jordan Spieth (3,5,13)
- Henrik Stenson (3)
- Tiger Woods (10)
- Ben Curtis, David Duval, and Paul Lawrie did not play.

2. The Open Champions aged 55 or under on 21 July 2024 (for all Champions from 2024)

3. The Open Champions for 2013–2023 (Note: All will be aged 60 or under on 21 July 2024.)

4. Top 10 finishers and ties in the 2023 Open Championship

- Jason Day (5,13)
- Tommy Fleetwood (5,6,13)
- Emiliano Grillo (13)
- Max Homa (5,13)
- Matthew Jordan
- Tom Kim (5,6,13)
- Jon Rahm (5,6,9,10,13)
- Shubhankar Sharma
- Sepp Straka (5,13)
- Cameron Young (5)

5. Top 50 players in the Official World Golf Ranking (OWGR) for Week 21, 2024

- Ludvig Åberg
- An Byeong-hun
- Akshay Bhatia
- Keegan Bradley (13)
- Sam Burns (13)
- Patrick Cantlay (13)
- Wyndham Clark (9,13)
- Eric Cole
- Corey Conners (13)
- Bryson DeChambeau (9)
- Austin Eckroat
- Harris English
- Tony Finau (13)
- Matt Fitzpatrick (6,9,13)
- Rickie Fowler (13)
- Lucas Glover (13)
- Tyrrell Hatton (6,13)
- Russell Henley (13)
- Nicolai Højgaard (6)
- Viktor Hovland (6,13)
- Im Sung-jae (13)
- Stephan Jäger
- Kim Si-woo (13)
- Chris Kirk
- Kurt Kitayama
- Brooks Koepka (11)
- Min Woo Lee (6)
- Hideki Matsuyama (10)
- Denny McCarthy
- Matthieu Pavon (6)
- J. T. Poston
- Xander Schauffele (11,13)
- Scottie Scheffler (10,12,13)
- Adam Schenk (13)
- Nick Taylor (13)
- Sahith Theegala
- Justin Thomas (11)
- Will Zalatoris (Note: Will Zalatoris initially qualified through the Arnold Palmer Invitational, but after he subsequently qualified through category 5, his OQS spot was reallocated to Brendon Todd.)

6. Top 30 in the final 2023 Race to Dubai rankings

- Alexander Björk
- Jorge Campillo
- Ryan Fox (7)
- Daniel Hillier
- Ryo Hisatsune
- Rasmus Højgaard
- Romain Langasque
- Thriston Lawrence
- Joost Luiten
- Robert MacIntyre
- Adrian Meronk
- Vincent Norrman
- Thorbjørn Olesen
- Yannik Paul
- Victor Perez
- Marcel Siem
- Jordan Smith
- Sami Välimäki
- Matt Wallace
- Sebastian Söderberg did not play. (Note: Sebastian Söderberg withdrew on the Wednesday before the championship due to a back and rib injury.)

7. Recent winners of the BMW PGA Championship (2021–2023)

- Billy Horschel

8. Top five players, not already exempt, within the top 20 of the 2024 Race to Dubai Rankings through the BMW International Open

- Laurie Canter
- Nacho Elvira
- Ewen Ferguson
- Matteo Manassero
- Jesper Svensson

9. Recent winners of the U.S. Open (2019–2024)

- Gary Woodland

10. Recent winners of the Masters Tournament (2019–2024)

- Dustin Johnson

11. Recent winners of the PGA Championship (2018–2024)

12. Recent winners of The Players Championship (2022–2024)

13. Top 30 players from the 2023 FedEx Cup points list

- Taylor Moore

14. Top five players, not already exempt, within the top 20 of the 2024 FedEx Cup points list through the Travelers Championship

- Christiaan Bezuidenhout
- Tom Hoge

15. Winner of the 2024 Visa Open de Argentina

- Mason Andersen

16. Top five players from the OWGR's International Federation Ranking List as of closing date

- Kazuma Kobori
- Keita Nakajima
- Andy Ogletree
- David Puig (Note: David Puig initially qualified through the IRS Prima Malaysian Open, but after he subsequently qualified through category 16, his OQS spot was reallocated to John Catlin.)
- Ryan van Velzen

17. Winner of the 2023 Japan Open Golf Championship

- Aguri Iwasaki

18. Winner of the 2023 Senior Open Championship

- Alex Čejka

19. Winner of the 2024 Amateur Championship (Note: Players must remain amateurs in order to be exempt under this category.)

- Jacob Skov Olesen (a)

20. Winner of the 2023 U.S. Amateur

- ~~Nick Dunlap~~ (Note: Dunlap forfeited his exemption by turning professional.)

21. Winner of the 2024 European Amateur

- Tommy Morrison (a)

22. Recipient of the 2023 Mark H. McCormack Medal

- Gordon Sargent (a)

23. Winner of the 2023 Asia-Pacific Amateur Championship

- Jasper Stubbs (a)

24. Winner of the 2024 Latin America Amateur Championship

- Santiago de la Fuente (a)

25. Winner of the 2024 Open Amateur Series (Note: Cumulative World Amateur Golf Ranking points from the St Andrews Links Trophy, The Amateur Championship and European Amateur.)

- Calum Scott (a)

26. Winner of the 2024 Africa Amateur Championship

- Altin van der Merwe (a)

27. Medical exemption

- Michael Hendry (Note: Hendry qualified for the 2023 Open but was unable to play after being diagnosed with leukemia in May 2023.)

=== Open Qualifying Series ===
The Open Qualifying Series (OQS) for the 2024 Open Championship consists of 12 events. Places are available to the leading players (not otherwise exempt) who make the cut. In the event of ties, positions go to players ranked highest according to that week's OWGR. If a player who has qualified through OQS becomes exempt through other criteria before 1 June, the next highest non-exempt finisher from that OQS event will become exempt.

Location	Tournament	Date	Spots	Qualifiers
South Africa	Joburg Open	26 Nov 2023	3	Dan Bradbury, Dean Burmester, Darren Fichardt
Australia	ISPS Handa Australian Open	3 Dec 2023	3	Rikuya Hoshino, Joaquín Niemann, Adam Scott
Malaysia	IRS Prima Malaysian Open	18 Feb 2024	3	Denwit Boriboonsub, John Catlin, Wang Jeung-hun
United States	Arnold Palmer Invitational	10 Mar 2024	1	Brendon Todd
Japan	Gateway to The Open Mizuno Open	26 May 2024	3	Yuto Katsuragawa, Ryosuke Kinoshita, Koh Gun-taek
Canada	RBC Canadian Open	2 Jun 2024	3	Ben Griffin, Mackenzie Hughes, Maverick McNealy
United States	Memorial Tournament	9 Jun 2024	1	Adam Hadwin
Korea	Kolon Korea Open	23 Jun 2024	2	Kim Min-kyu, Song Young-han
Netherlands	KLM Open	23 Jun 2024	2	Joe Dean, Guido Migliozzi
Italy	Italian Open	30 Jun 2024	2	Sean Crocker, Tom McKibbin
United States	John Deere Classic	7 Jul 2024	2	Pan Cheng-tsung, Davis Thompson
Scotland	Genesis Scottish Open	14 Jul 2024	3	Richard Mansell, Alex Norén, Aaron Rai

=== Final qualifying ===
Regional qualifying events were held on 24 June at 15 locations. Final qualifying events were played on 2 July at four locations, with a minimum of 16 total places available.

Location	Spots	Qualifiers
Burnham & Berrow	4	Abraham Ancer, Dominic Clemons (a), Charlie Lindh, Justin Rose
Dundonald Links	4	Ángel Hidalgo, Sam Hutsby, Jack McDonald, Liam Nolan (a)
Royal Cinque Ports	4	Luis Masaveu (a), Jaime Montojo (a), Elvis Smylie, Matthew Southgate
West Lancashire	4	Dan Brown, Matty Dodd-Berry (a), Sam Horsfield, Masahiro Kawamura
