= 2023 FedEx Cup Playoffs =

Tournament information
- Dates: August 10–27, 2023
- Location: TPC Southwind; Olympia Fields Country Club; East Lake Golf Club
- Tour: PGA Tour

Statistics
- Field: 70 for FedEx St. Jude Ch. 50 for BMW Championship; 30 for Tour Championship
- Prize fund: $75 million (bonus money)
- Winner's share: $18 million (bonus money)

Champion
- (Norway) Viktor Hovland
- −27

The 2023 FedEx Cup Playoffs, the series of three golf tournaments that determined the 2022–23 season champion on the U.S.-based PGA Tour, were played from August 10–27. It included the following three events:

- FedEx St. Jude Championship – TPC Southwind, Memphis, Tennessee
- BMW Championship – Olympia Fields Country Club, Olympia Fields, Illinois
- Tour Championship – East Lake Golf Club, Atlanta, Georgia

This was the 17th FedEx Cup playoffs since their inception in 2007. Viktor Hovland was the 2023 Champion.

The point distributions can be seen here.

== Changes from 2022 ==
The top 70 players on the FedEx Cup regular-season standings qualified for the first playoff event, down from 125; the field of the second event was reduced from 70 to 50. With the PGA Tour reverting to a calendar-based schedule, the Playoffs no longer form the conclusion to the PGA Tour season, but all 70 qualifiers earned an exemption for the 2024 season regardless of results in the fall. The 50 qualifiers for the BMW Championship earned entry into limited-field signature events in 2024.

== Regular-season rankings ==
The leading 10 players in the FedEx Cup regular-season standings qualified for a share of the $20 million Comcast Business Tour top 10 bonus.

Place	Player	Points	Events	Bonus ($)
1	(Spain) Jon Rahm	3,320	17	4,000,000
2	(United States) Scottie Scheffler	3,146	20	3,000,000
3	(Northern Ireland) Rory McIlroy	2,304	15	2,400,000
4	(United States) Max Homa	2,128	21	2,200,000
5	(United States) Wyndham Clark	1,944	25	2,000,000
6	(United States) Brian Harman	1,827	24	1,700,000
7	(Norway) Viktor Hovland	1,795	20	1,400,000
8	(United States) Keegan Bradley	1,774	20	1,200,000
9	(United States) Rickie Fowler	1,732	22	1,100,000
10	(United States) Tony Finau	1,655	21	1,000,000

== Playoff tournaments ==
=== FedEx St. Jude Championship ===
The FedEx St. Jude Championship was played August 10–13. 70 players were eligible to play in the event. There was no second-round cut.

Lucas Glover won the tournament, beating Patrick Cantlay in a playoff. It was Glover's second victory in as many weeks, having won the Wyndham Championship in the final week of the regular season. The top 50 players in the points standings advanced to the BMW Championship. Cameron Davis (ranked 62nd to 45th) and Hideki Matsuyama (57 to 47) were the only two players to climb into the top 50, with Mackenzie Hughes (47 to 51) and Nick Hardy (50 to 52) dropping out.

					FedEx Cup rank	
Place	Player	Score	To par	Winnings ($)	Before	After
1	(United States) Lucas Glover	66-64-66-69=265	−15	3,600,000	49	4
2	(United States) Patrick Cantlay	68-67-66-64=265	−15	2,160,000	13	5
T3	(England) Tommy Fleetwood	66-66-66-68=266	−14	1,160,000	26	10
T3	(Northern Ireland) Rory McIlroy	67-66-68-65=266	−14	1,160,000	3	3
5	(United States) Taylor Moore	66-66-65-71=268	−12	800,000	25	14
T6	(Canada) Corey Conners	67-72-65-65=269	−11	584,286	30	25
T6	(Australia) Cameron Davis	66-67-69-67=269	−11	584,286	62	45
T6	(United States) Russell Henley	67-68-67-67=269	−11	584,286	20	15
T6	(United States) Max Homa	68-66-65-70=269	−11	584,286	4	6
T6	(South Korea) Im Sung-jae	67-65-69-68=269	−11	584,286	32	28
T6	(United States) Adam Schenk	69-66-68-66=269	−11	584,286	24	20
T6	(United States) Jordan Spieth	63-68-68-70=269	−11	584,286	31	27

- Par 70 course

=== BMW Championship ===
The BMW Championship will be played August 17–20. 50 players are eligible to play in the event. There is no second-round cut.

Hideki Matsuyama withdrew prior to the second round with a back injury, thus ending his streak of qualifying for nine consecutive Tour Championship's, the longest streak of any active player.

=== Tour Championship ===
The Tour Championship will be played August 24–27. 30 golfers are qualified for the tournament. There is no second-round cut.

== Table of qualified players ==
Table key:

Win
Top-10 finish
Did not advance to next tournament
Played way into next tournament

	Player	Pre-Playoffs		FedEx St. Jude Championship		BMW Championship		Tour Championship		
	Player	Points	Rank	Finish	Rank after	Finish	Rank after	Starting score	Final score	Final rank
(Spain)	Jon Rahm	3,320	1	T37	1	T31	4	−6	−7	T18
(United States)	Scottie Scheffler	3,146	2	T31	2	T2	1	−10	−11	T6
(Northern Ireland)	Rory McIlroy	2,304	3	T3	3	4	3	−7	−14	4
(United States)	Max Homa	2,128	4	T6	6	T5	6	−4	−10	T9
(United States)	Wyndham Clark	1,944	5	T66	8	T15	9	−4	−16	3
(United States)	Brian Harman	1,827	6	T31	9	T5	8	−4	−4	23
(Norway)	Viktor Hovland	1,795	7	T13	7	1	2	−8	−27	1
(United States)	Keegan Bradley	1,774	8	T43	11	T29	13	−3	−10	T9
(United States)	Rickie Fowler	1,732	9	T58	12	T25	14	−3	−8	T16
(United States)	Tony Finau	1,655	10	64	13	T37	18	−2	−6	T20
(Australia)	Jason Day	1,506	11	T52	21	T45	25	−1	+3	28
(Canada)	Nick Taylor	1,463	12	T24	16	47	22	−1	−2	25
(United States)	Patrick Cantlay	1,443	13	2	5	T15	7	−4	−13	5
(South Korea)	Tom Kim	1,422	14	T24	18	T10	16	−2	−6	T20
(Austria)	Sepp Straka	1,413	15	63	24	T37	30	E	−9	T14
(United States)	Xander Schauffele	1,406	16	T24	19	T8	15	−3	−22	2
(England)	Tyrrell Hatton	1,381	17	T43	26	T34	28	E	−8	T16
(South Korea)	Kim Si-woo	1,372	18	T16	17	T31	20	−2	−6	T20
(United States)	Sam Burns	1,335	19	T52	30	T15	26	E	−10	T9
(United States)	Russell Henley	1,296	20	T6	15	T8	12	−3	−9	T14
(Argentina)	Emiliano Grillo	1,275	21	T20	23	T31	27	E	+6	T29
(United States)	Collin Morikawa	1,246	22	T13	22	T25	24	−1	−11	T6
(United States)	Kurt Kitayama	1,216	23	T52	33	T41	36	–	–	36
(United States)	Adam Schenk	1,213	24	T6	20	T34	23	−1	−10	T9
(United States)	Taylor Moore	1,193	25	5	14	49	21	−1	+6	T29
(England)	Tommy Fleetwood	1,184	26	T3	10	T25	11	−3	−11	T6
(United States)	Denny McCarthy	1,179	27	T66	34	T10	33	–	–	33
(United States)	Chris Kirk	1,161	28	T16	29	T29	32	–	–	32
(Republic of Ireland)	Séamus Power	1,133	29	T66	35	48	41	–	–	41
(Canada)	Corey Conners	1,103	30	T6	25	T10	19	−2	−1	26
(United States)	Jordan Spieth	1,099	31	T6	27	T34	29	E	+1	27
(South Korea)	Im Sung-jae	1,098	32	T6	28	7	17	−3	−1	24
(England)	Justin Rose	1,088	33	T20	32	T22	34	–	–	34
(United States)	Sahith Theegala	1,065	34	T13	31	T15	31	–	–	31
(United States)	Lee Hodges	1,052	35	T31	36	T45	40	–	–	40
(England)	Matt Fitzpatrick	1,049	36	T66	40	T2	10	−4	−10	T9
(South Korea)	An Byeong-hun	1,041	37	T37	38	43	44	–	–	44
(Canada)	Adam Svensson	1,014	38	T37	39	T15	37	–	–	37
(United States)	Brendon Todd	973	39	T43	44	T41	47	–	–	47
(United States)	Eric Cole*	950	40	T31	42	T25	43	–	–	43
(United States)	Andrew Putnam	918	41	T24	41	T10	35	–	–	35
(United States)	Harris English	914	42	T52	49	T10	38	–	–	38
(United States)	Patrick Rodgers	914	43	T52	50	T37	49	–	–	49
(Canada)	Adam Hadwin	908	44	T16	37	44	45	–	–	45
(United States)	J. T. Poston	907	45	T24	43	T22	39	–	–	39
(United States)	Tom Hoge	897	46	T43	48	21	46	–	–	46
(Canada)	Mackenzie Hughes	890	47	T58	51	–	–	–	–	51
(United States)	Cameron Young	889	48	T31	46	T15	42	–	–	42
(United States)	Lucas Glover	885	49	1	4	T22	5	−5	−7	T18
(United States)	Nick Hardy*	868	50	T49	52	–	–	–	–	52
(United States)	Alex Smalley	864	51	65	54	–	–	–	–	54
(Belgium)	Thomas Detry*	851	52	T61	55	–	–	–	–	55
(United States)	Taylor Montgomery*	823	53	T37	53	–	–	–	–	53
(United States)	Davis Riley	768	54	T43	59	–	–	–	–	59
(United States)	Brandon Wu	763	55	T37	57	–	–	–	–	57
(United States)	Hayden Buckley	754	56	T52	60	–	–	–	–	60
(Japan)	Hideki Matsuyama	742	57	T16	47	WD	50	–	–	50
(United States)	Keith Mitchell	698	58	T43	64	–	–	–	–	64
(United States)	Mark Hubbard	697	59	T66	67	–	–	–	–	67
(United States)	Matt Kuchar	695	60	T61	66	–	–	–	–	66
(Germany)	Stephan Jäger	692	61	T20	56	–	–	–	–	56
(Australia)	Cameron Davis	685	62	T6	45	40	48	–	–	48
(United States)	Sam Ryder	675	63	T31	61	–	–	–	–	61
(United States)	Sam Stevens*	670	64	T37	65	–	–	–	–	65
(England)	Aaron Rai	670	65	T49	68	–	–	–	–	68
(United States)	Beau Hossler	658	66	T20	58	–	–	–	–	58
(United States)	Matthew NeSmith	642	67	T58	70	–	–	–	–	70
(Sweden)	Vincent Norrman*	636	68	T49	69	–	–	–	–	69
(United States)	J. J. Spaun	634	69	T24	62	–	–	–	–	62
(United States)	Ben Griffin*	617	70	T24	63	–	–	–	–	63

* First-time Playoffs qualifier
DNP = Did not play
WD = Withdrew
