= 2023 WGC-Dell Technologies Match Play =

Tournament information
- Dates: March 22–26, 2023
- Location: Austin, Texas, U.S. 30.343°N 97.797°W
- Course: Austin Country Club
- Tours: PGA Tour; European Tour; Japan Golf Tour
- Format: Match play (18 holes)

Statistics
- Par: 71
- Length: 7,108 yards (6,500 m)
- Field: 64 players
- Prize fund: US$20,000,000
- Winner's share: $3,500,000

Champion
- (United States) Sam Burns
- Location in the United States Location in Texas

The 2023 WGC-Dell Technologies Match Play was the 24th and final WGC Match Play, played March 22–26 at Austin Country Club in Austin, Texas.

The field consisted of the top 64 available eligible players from the Official World Golf Ranking on March 13. A number of other players were in the top 64 but, having joined LIV Golf, were suspended by the PGA Tour and ineligible to compete.

On March 6, 2023, tournament organizers and the PGA Tour announced that the 2023 event would be the last edition of WGC Match Play.

Sam Burns won the event, beating Cameron Young, 6 and 5, in the final. In the morning semi-finals Burns beat world number 1 Scottie Scheffler while Young beat world number 3 Rory McIlroy, both matches going to extra holes.

== Format ==
The 64 players were placed into four seeded pools, the 16 highest ranked players as of March 20 in Pool A, the next 16 in Pool B, etc. The top seeds (Pool A) are placed into 16 groups in order, with the groups completed by means of a random draw of one player from each of the remaining pools. Each group is played as a round-robin of match play matches, held on Wednesday, Thursday and Friday, with one point awarded for a win and half a point for a tie. The 16 group winners advance to the knockout stage. If two or more players are tied on points at the end of the group stage, there is a sudden death stroke play playoff between the tied players to determine the winner of the group. In the knockout stage, the round of 16 is played on Saturday morning, with the quarterfinals on Saturday afternoon. The semi-finals are played on Sunday morning, and the final and third place playoff are played on Sunday afternoon. In total, barring withdrawals, those reaching the last four play seven rounds of golf.

== Field ==
The field consisted of the top 64 available eligible players from the Official World Golf Ranking on March 13. They are listed with their ranking as of March 20, which determined the seeding, followed in parentheses by their ranking as of March 13.

Pool A
Seed	Player	OWGR
1	(United States) Scottie Scheffler	1 (1)
2	(Spain) Jon Rahm	2 (2)
3	(Northern Ireland) Rory McIlroy	3 (3)
4	(United States) Patrick Cantlay	4 (4)
5	(United States) Max Homa	6 (6)
6	(United States) Xander Schauffele	7 (7)
7	(United States) Will Zalatoris	8 (8)
8	(Norway) Viktor Hovland	9 (9)
9	(United States) Collin Morikawa	11 (11)
10	(United States) Tony Finau	12 (12)
11	(England) Matt Fitzpatrick	13 (13)
12	(United States) Jordan Spieth	14 (14)
13	(United States) Sam Burns	15 (15)
14	(England) Tyrrell Hatton	16 (17)
15	(United States) Cameron Young	17 (16)
16	(South Korea) Im Sung-jae	18 (18)

Pool B
Seed	Player	OWGR
17	(South Korea) Tom Kim	19 (19)
18	(Japan) Hideki Matsuyama	20 (20)
19	(United States) Kurt Kitayama	21 (21)
20	(United States) Keegan Bradley	22 (22)
21	(Republic of Ireland) Shane Lowry	23 (23)
22	(United States) Billy Horschel	24 (25)
23	(United States) Tom Hoge	25 (24)
24	(England) Tommy Fleetwood	26 (27)
25	(United States) Brian Harman	28 (28)
26	(United States) Sahith Theegala	29 (29)
27	(Austria) Sepp Straka	32 (31)
28	(United States) Chris Kirk	33 (35)
29	(New Zealand) Ryan Fox	34 (34)
30	(Republic of Ireland) Séamus Power	35 (33)
31	(United States) Russell Henley	36 (36)
32	(Australia) Jason Day	37 (37)

Pool C
Seed	Player	OWGR
33	(Australia) Adam Scott	38 (38)
34	(South Korea) Kim Si-woo	39 (39)
35	(South Korea) Lee Kyoung-hoon	40 (43)
36	(Canada) Corey Conners	41 (40)
37	(United States) Harris English	43 (41)
38	(Sweden) Alex Norén	44 (44)
39	(United States) Keith Mitchell	45 (47)
40	(United States) Aaron Wise	46 (48)
41	(Australia) Min Woo Lee	47 (45)
42	(United States) Kevin Kisner	48 (46)
43	(United States) J. T. Poston	52 (54)
44	(Canada) Adam Svensson	54 (52)
45	(Poland) Adrian Meronk	55 (53)
46	(Australia) Lucas Herbert	56 (55)
47	(United States) Taylor Montgomery	57 (56)
48	(United States) Denny McCarthy	58 (57)

Pool D
Seed	Player	OWGR
49	(United States) Rickie Fowler	59 (59)
50	(Canada) Mackenzie Hughes	60 (58)
51	(France) Victor Perez	61 (63)
52	(United States) Scott Stallings	62 (60)
53	(Canada) Adam Hadwin	63 (61)
54	(United States) Davis Riley	64 (64)
55	(Canada) Nick Taylor	67 (72)
56	(United States) Andrew Putnam	68 (66)
57	(United States) Davis Thompson	69 (67)
58	(United States) Maverick McNealy	70 (69)
59	(United States) Matt Kuchar	71 (70)
60	(South Africa) Christiaan Bezuidenhout	72 (68)
61	(United States) J. J. Spaun	75 (72)
62	(United States) Ben Griffin	77 (75)
63	(United States) Justin Suh	78 (77)
64	(Australia) Cameron Davis	79 (76)

- Justin Thomas (10) and Justin Rose (32) were eligible but did not play.

=== Ineligible players ===
The following players were ineligible to compete, having been suspended by the PGA Tour after joining LIV Golf. Their world rankings as of March 13 are given.

- Cameron Smith (5)
- Joaquín Niemann (26)
- Abraham Ancer (30)
- Thomas Pieters (42)
- Talor Gooch (49)
- Mito Pereira (50)
- Harold Varner III (51)
- Dustin Johnson (62)
- Patrick Reed (65)
- Dean Burmester (71)
- Jason Kokrak (74)

== Results ==
=== Pool play ===
Players were divided into 16 groups of four players, and played round-robin matches Wednesday to Friday.

- Round 1 – March 22
- Round 2 – March 23
- Round 3 – March 24

==== Group 1 ====
Rank	Player (seed)	W	L	T	Pts	Match results		
1	(United States) Scottie Scheffler (1)	3	0	0	3	Beat Riley 1 up	Beat Norén 5 & 4	Beat Kim 3 & 2
2	(United States) Davis Riley (54)	1	1	1	1.5	Lost to Scheffler 1 down	Beat Kim 1 up	Tied Norén
3	(South Korea) Tom Kim (17)	1	2	0	1	Beat Norén 2 & 1	Lost to Riley 1 down	Lost to Scheffler 3 & 2
4	(Sweden) Alex Norén (38)	0	2	1	0.5	Lost to Kim 2 & 1	Lost to Scheffler 5 & 4	Tied Riley

==== Group 2 ====
Rank	Player (seed)	W	L	T	Pts	Match results		
1	(United States) Billy Horschel (22)	2	0	1	2.5	Tied Mitchell	Beat Fowler 3 & 2	Beat Rahm 5 & 4
2	(United States) Rickie Fowler (49)	2	1	0	2	Beat Rahm 2 & 1	Lost to Horschel 3 & 2	Beat Mitchell 1 up
3	(Spain) Jon Rahm (2)	1	2	0	1	Lost to Fowler 2 & 1	Beat Mitchell 4 & 3	Lost to Horschel 5 & 4
4	(United States) Keith Mitchell (39)	0	2	1	0.5	Tied Horschel	Lost to Rahm 4 & 3	Lost to Fowler 1 down

==== Group 3 ====
Rank	Player (seed)	W	L	T	Pts	Match results		
1	(Northern Ireland) Rory McIlroy (3)	3	0	0	3	Beat Stallings 3 & 1	Beat McCarthy 2 up	Beat Bradley 3 & 2
2	(United States) Keegan Bradley (20)	1	1	1	1.5	Tied McCarthy	Beat Stallings 6 & 5	Lost to McIlroy 3 & 2
3	(United States) Scott Stallings (52)	1	2	0	1	Lost to McIlroy 3 & 1	Lost to Bradley 6 & 5	Beat McCarthy 1 up
4	(United States) Denny McCarthy (48)	0	2	1	0.5	Tied Bradley	Lost to McIlroy 2 down	Lost to Stallings 1 down

==== Group 4 ====
Rank	Player (seed)	W	L	T	Pts	Match results		
1	(United States) Patrick Cantlay (4)	3	0	0	3	Beat Taylor 1 up	Beat Lee 4 & 2	Beat Harman 2 & 1
2	(United States) Brian Harman (25)	2	1	0	2	Beat Lee 3 & 1	Beat Taylor 3 & 2	Lost to Cantlay 2 & 1
3	(Canada) Nick Taylor (55)	1	2	0	1	Lost to Cantlay 1 down	Lost to Harman 3 & 2	Beat Lee 3 & 2
4	(South Korea) Lee Kyoung-hoon (35)	0	3	0	0	Lost to Harman 3 & 1	Lost to Cantley 4 & 2	Lost to Taylor 3 & 2

==== Group 5 ====
Rank	Player (seed)	W	L	T	Pts	Match results		
1	(United States) Max Homa (5)	3	0	0	3	Beat Suh 3 & 2	Beat Kisner 3 & 2	Beat Matsuyama (conceded) (Note: Matsuyama conceded the match against Homa before tee-off due to a back injury.)
T2	(Japan) Hideki Matsuyama (18)	1	2	0	1	Beat Kisner 1 up	Lost to Suh 3 & 1	Lost to Homa (conceded)
T2	(United States) Kevin Kisner (42)	1	2	0	1	Lost to Matsuyama 1 down	Lost to Homa 3 & 2	Beat Suh 2 up
T2	(United States) Justin Suh (63)	1	2	0	1	Lost to Homa 3 & 2	Beat Matsuyama 3 & 1	Lost to Kisner 2 down

==== Group 6 ====
Rank	Player (seed)	W	L	T	Pts	Match results		
1	(United States) Xander Schauffele (6)	3	0	0	3	Beat Davis 4 & 3	Beat Wise 2 & 1	Beat Hoge 1 up
2	(Australia) Cameron Davis (64)	2	1	0	2	Lost to Schauffele 4 & 3	Beat Hoge 3 & 1	Beat Wise 1 up
3	(United States) Aaron Wise (40)	1	2	0	1	Beat Hoge 1 up	Lost to Schauffele 2 & 1	Lost to Davis 1 down
4	(United States) Tom Hoge (23)	0	3	0	0	Lost to Wise 1 down	Lost to Davis 3 & 1	Lost to Schauffele 1 down

==== Group 7 ====
Rank	Player (seed)	W	L	T	Pts	Match results		
1	(United States) Andrew Putnam (56)	3	0	0	3	Beat Zalatoris 3 & 2	Beat Fox 2 & 1	Beat English 4 & 3
2	(New Zealand) Ryan Fox (29)	2	1	0	2	Beat English 2 & 1	Lost to Putnam 2 & 1	Beat Zalatoris (conceded) (Note: Zalatoris conceded the match against Fox before tee-off due to illness.)
3	(United States) Harris English (37)	1	2	0	1	Lost to Fox 2 & 1	Beat Zalatoris 5 & 3	Lost to Putnam 4 & 3
4	(United States) Will Zalatoris (7)	0	3	0	0	Lost to Putnam 3 & 2	Lost to English 5 & 3	Lost to Fox (conceded)

==== Group 8 ====
Rank	Player (seed)	W	L	T	Pts	Match results		
1	(United States) Matt Kuchar (59)	2	0	1	2.5	Beat Hovland 3 & 1	Tied Kirk	Beat Kim 7 & 6
2	(South Korea) Kim Si-woo (34)	2	1	0	2	Beat Kirk 4 & 3	Beat Hovland 4&3	Lost to Kuchar 7 & 6
3	(Norway) Viktor Hovland (8)	1	2	0	1	Lost to Kuchar 3 & 1	Lost to Kim 4&3	Beat Kirk 4 & 3
4	(United States) Chris Kirk (28)	0	2	1	0.5	Lost to Kim 4 & 3	Tied Kuchar	Lost to Hovland 4 & 3

==== Group 9 ====
Rank	Player (seed)	W	L	T	Pts	Match results		
1	(Australia) Jason Day (32)	3	0	0	3	Beat Svensson 4 & 2	Beat Perez 2 & 1	Beat Morikawa 4 & 3
2	(United States) Collin Morikawa (9)	1	1	1	1.5	Beat Perez 2 & 1	Tied Svensson	Lost to Day 4 & 3
3	(France) Victor Perez (51)	1	2	0	1	Lost to Morikawa 2 & 1	Lost to Day 2 & 1	Beat Svensson 5 & 4
4	(Canada) Adam Svensson (44)	0	2	1	0.5	Lost to Day 4 & 2	Tied Morikawa	Lost to Perez 5 & 4

==== Group 10 ====
Rank	Player (seed)	W	L	T	Pts	Match results		
1	(United States) Kurt Kitayama (19)	2	1	0	2	Lost to Meronk 2 & 1	Beat Bezuidenhout 2 & 1	Beat Finau 4 & 3
T2	(United States) Tony Finau (10)	2	1	0	2	Beat Bezuidenhout 2 & 1	Beat Meronk 4 & 3	Lost to Kitayama 4 & 3
T2	(Poland) Adrian Meronk (45)	2	1	0	2	Beat Kitayama 2 & 1	Lost to Finau 4 & 3	Beat Bezuidenhout 5 & 4
4	(South Africa) Christiaan Bezuidenhout (60)	0	3	0	0	Lost to Finau 2 & 1	Lost to Kitayama 2 & 1	Lost to Meronk 5 & 4

Kitayama won the group after a sudden-death playoff; he made a birdie on the second extra hole to defeat Meronk, after Finau had been eliminated on the first extra hole when he made a double bogey as the others made par.

==== Group 11 ====
Rank	Player (seed)	W	L	T	Pts	Match results		
1	(United States) J. J. Spaun (61)	3	0	0	3	Beat Fitzpatrick 5 & 3	Beat Theegala 5 & 4	Beat Lee 2 & 1
T2	(England) Matt Fitzpatrick (11)	1	2	0	1	Lost to Spaun 5 & 3	Beat Lee 2 up	Lost to Theegala 2 & 1
T2	(United States) Sahith Theegala (26)	1	2	0	1	Lost to Lee 1 down	Lost to Spaun 5 & 4	Beat Fitzpatrick 2 & 1
T2	(Australia) Min Woo Lee (41)	1	2	0	1	Beat Theegala 1 up	Lost to Fitzpatrick 2 down	Lost to Spaun 2 & 1

==== Group 12 ====
Rank	Player (seed)	W	L	T	Pts	Match results		
1	(Canada) Mackenzie Hughes (50)	2	1	0	2	Lost to Spieth 4 & 3	Beat Lowry 4 & 3	Beat Montgomery 6 & 4
2	(United States) Taylor Montgomery (47)	2	1	0	2	Beat Lowry 2 & 1	Beat Spieth 2 & 1	Lost to Hughes 6 & 4
T3	(United States) Jordan Spieth (12)	1	2	0	1	Beat Hughes 4 & 3	Lost to Montgomery 2 & 1	Lost to Lowry 2 & 1
T3	(Republic of Ireland) Shane Lowry (21)	1	2	0	1	Lost to Montgomery 2 & 1	Lost to Hughes 4 & 3	Beat Spieth 2 & 1

Hughes won the group after a sudden-death playoff; he made a birdie on the first extra hole to defeat Montgomery, who made a bogey.

==== Group 13 ====
Rank	Player (seed)	W	L	T	Pts	Match results		
1	(United States) Sam Burns (13)	3	0	0	3	Beat Hadwin 3 & 2	Beat Scott 1 up	Beat Power 2 up
T2	(Republic of Ireland) Séamus Power (30)	1	2	0	1	Lost to Scott 1 down	Beat Hadwin 1 up	Lost to Burns 2 down
T2	(Australia) Adam Scott (33)	1	2	0	1	Beat Power 1 up	Lost to Burns 1 down	Lost to Hadwin 3 & 2
T2	(Canada) Adam Hadwin (53)	1	2	0	1	Lost to Burns 3 & 2	Lost to Power 1 down	Beat Scott 3 & 2

==== Group 14 ====
Rank	Player (seed)	W	L	T	Pts	Match results		
1	(Australia) Lucas Herbert (46)	3	0	0	3	Beat Henley 1 up	Beat Hatton 2 & 1	Beat Griffin 3 & 1
2	(United States) Russell Henley (31)	2	1	0	2	Lost to Herbert 1 down	Beat Griffin 5 & 4	Beat Hatton 3 & 2
3	(United States) Ben Griffin (62)	1	2	0	1	Beat Hatton 3 & 1	Lost to Henley 5 & 4	Lost to Herbert 3 & 1
4	(England) Tyrrell Hatton (14)	0	3	0	0	Lost to Griffin 3 & 1	Lost to Herbert 2 & 1	Lost to Henley 3 & 2

==== Group 15 ====
Rank	Player (seed)	W	L	T	Pts	Match results		
1	(United States) Cameron Young (15)	3	0	0	3	Beat Thompson 3 & 2	Beat Conners 1 up	Beat Straka 5 & 3
2	(Canada) Corey Conners (36)	2	1	0	2	Beat Straka 6 & 5	Lost to Young 1 down	Beat Thompson 2 & 1
3	(United States) Davis Thompson (57)	1	2	0	1	Lost to Young 3 & 2	Beat Straka 4 & 3	Lost to Conners 2 & 1
4	(Austria) Sepp Straka (27)	0	3	0	0	Lost to Conners 6 & 5	Lost to Thompson 4 & 3	Lost to Young 5 & 3

==== Group 16 ====
Rank	Player (seed)	W	L	T	Pts	Match results		
1	(United States) J. T. Poston (43)	3	0	0	3	Beat Fleetwood 3 & 2	Beat Im 1 up	Beat McNealy 3 & 1
2	(South Korea) Im Sung-jae (16)	2	1	0	2	Beat McNealy 8 & 6	Lost to Poston 1 down	Beat Fleetwood 4 & 3
T3	(England) Tommy Fleetwood (24)	0	2	1	0.5	Lost to Poston 3 & 2	Tied McNealy	Lost to Im 4 & 3
T3	(United States) Maverick McNealy (58)	0	2	1	0.5	Lost to Im 8 & 6	Tied Fleetwood	Lost to Poston 3 & 1

=== Final 16 bracket ===
First round March 25 – morning
1	(United States) Scottie Scheffler	1 up
43	(United States) J. T. Poston
32	(Australia) Jason Day	1 up
59	(United States) Matt Kuchar
5	(United States) Max Homa
50	(Canada) Mackenzie Hughes	3&2
13	(United States) Sam Burns	2&1
4	(United States) Patrick Cantlay
22	(United States) Billy Horschel
15	(United States) Cameron Young	5&4
19	(United States) Kurt Kitayama	6&5
56	(United States) Andrew Putnam
6	(United States) Xander Schauffele	3&2
61	(United States) J. J. Spaun
46	(Australia) Lucas Herbert
3	(Northern Ireland) Rory McIlroy	2 up

Quarter-finals; March 25 – afternoon
1	(United States) Scottie Scheffler	2&1
32	(Australia) Jason Day
50	(Canada) Mackenzie Hughes
13	(United States) Sam Burns	3&2
15	(United States) Cameron Young	1 up
19	(United States) Kurt Kitayama
6	(United States) Xander Schauffele
3	(Northern Ireland) Rory McIlroy	1 up

Semi-finals; March 26 – morning
1	(United States) Scottie Scheffler
13	(United States) Sam Burns	21h
15	(United States) Cameron Young	19h
3	(Northern Ireland) Rory McIlroy

Final; March 26 – afternoon
13	(United States) Sam Burns	6&5
15	(United States) Cameron Young
Third place
1	(United States) Scottie Scheffler
3	(Northern Ireland) Rory McIlroy	2&1

== Prize money breakdown ==
Place	Description	US$
1	Champion	3,500,000
2	Runner-up	2,200,000
3	Third place	1,420,000
4	Fourth place	1,145,000
T5	Losing quarter-finalists x 4	645,000
T9	Losing round of 16 x 8	365,000
T17	Those with 2 points in pool play x 11	219,909
T28	Those with 1.5 points in pool play x 3	166,000
T31	Those with 1 point in pool play x 21	113,762
T52	Those with 0.5 points in pool play x 7	74,857
T59	Those with 0 points in pool play x 6	67,500
	Total	20,000,000

Positions for players who did not qualify for the knockout stage were based on points scored in pool play.
