= Taylor Moore =

Taylor Moore is a name. People with that name include:

- Taylor Moore (golfer) (born 1993), American golfer
- Taylor Moore (footballer) (born 1997), English footballer
