= 2022–23 PGA Tour =

Golf tour season

2022–23 PGA Tour season
- Duration: September 15, 2022 – November 19, 2023
- Number of official events: 54 (Note: One further tournament was scheduled but was canceled.)
- Most wins: (Spain) Jon Rahm (4)
- FedEx Cup: (Norway) Viktor Hovland
- Money list: (United States) Scottie Scheffler
- Player of the Year: (United States) Scottie Scheffler
- Rookie of the Year: (United States) Eric Cole

The 2022–23 PGA Tour was the 108th season of the PGA Tour, the main professional golf tour in the United States. It was also the 55th season since separating from the PGA of America, and the 17th edition of the FedEx Cup.

== Changes for 2022–23 ==
It was the final season with the current wraparound format (that started in 2013–14). The tour returned to a traditional calendar-year format in 2024.

=== Prize funds ===
The Tour announced record prize money for the 2022–23 season, with increased purses for elevated events including:

- Sentry Tournament of Champions (from US$8.2 million to $15 million)
- Genesis Invitational (from $12 million to $20 million)
- Arnold Palmer Invitational (from $12 million to $20 million)
- The Players Championship (from $20 million to $25 million)
- WGC-Dell Technologies Match Play (from $12 million to $20 million)
- Memorial Tournament (from $12 million to $20 million)
- FedEx Cup playoff events (from $15 million to $20 million)

On October 19, 2022, the Tour announced four additional events with elevated purses:

- WM Phoenix Open (from $8.5 million to $20 million)
- RBC Heritage (from $8.3 million to $20 million)
- Wells Fargo Championship (from $9.3 million to $20 million)
- Travelers Championship (from $8.6 million to $20 million)

=== Eligibility changes ===
The number of players competing in the FedEx Cup playoffs will be reduced from 125 to 70. The top 70 will compete at the FedEx St. Jude Championship, the top 50 at the BMW Championship, and the top 30 at the Tour Championship. Even with the FedEx Cup changes, the eligibility for those who retain their PGA Tour cards will not change after the remainder of the season, with the top 125 retaining full PGA Tour privileges and non-exempt players 126–150th receiving conditional PGA Tour status.

Prior to the start of the season, it was reported that a letter had been sent to PGA Tour members who had joined LIV Golf but not resigned their membership of the PGA Tour advising them that their membership would "not be renewed for the 2022–23 season".

== LIV Golf agreement ==
In June 2023, it was announced that the Public Investment Fund, the PGA Tour, and the European Tour would create a new entity to serve the best interests of each entity.

== Schedule ==
The following table lists official events during the 2022–23 season.

Date	Tournament	Location	Purse (US$)	Winner(s) (Note: The number in parentheses after each winner's name is the number of PGA Tour events they had won up to and including that tournament. This information is only shown for PGA Tour members.)	OWGR points	Other tours (Note: EUR − European Tour; JPN − Japan Golf Tour.)	Notes
Sep 18	Fortinet Championship	California	8,000,000	(United States) Max Homa (5)	40.49		
Oct 2	Sanderson Farms Championship	Mississippi	7,900,000	(Canada) Mackenzie Hughes (2)	35.67		
Oct 9	Shriners Children's Open	Nevada	8,000,000	(South Korea) Tom Kim (2)	42.19		
Oct 16	Zozo Championship	Japan	11,000,000	(United States) Keegan Bradley (5)	31.39	JPN (Note: Japan Golf Tour unofficial event)	Limited-field event
Oct 23	CJ Cup	South Carolina	10,500,000	(Northern Ireland) Rory McIlroy (23)	45.64		Limited-field event
~~Oct 30~~	WGC-HSBC Champions	China	–	Canceled	–		World Golf Championship
Oct 30	Butterfield Bermuda Championship	Bermuda	6,500,000	(Republic of Ireland) Séamus Power (2)	21.39		~~Alternate event~~ (Note: With the cancelation of the WGC-HSBC Champions, the Butterfield Bermuda Championship was elevated to a full status event.)
Nov 6	World Wide Technology Championship	Mexico	8,200,000	(United States) Russell Henley (4)	40.09		
Nov 13	Cadence Bank Houston Open	Texas	8,400,000	(United States) Tony Finau (5)	38.10		
Nov 20	RSM Classic	Georgia	8,100,000	(Canada) Adam Svensson (1)	37.05		
Jan 8	Sentry Tournament of Champions	Hawaii	15,000,000	(Spain) Jon Rahm (8)	37.68		Designated event (Note: Also a limited-field event)
Jan 15	Sony Open in Hawaii	Hawaii	7,900,000	(South Korea) Kim Si-woo (4)	39.50		
Jan 22	The American Express	California	8,000,000	(Spain) Jon Rahm (9)	52.64		Pro-Am
Jan 28	Farmers Insurance Open	California	8,700,000	(United States) Max Homa (6)	47.06		
Feb 6	AT&T Pebble Beach Pro-Am	California	9,000,000	(England) Justin Rose (11)	34.71		Pro-Am
Feb 12	WM Phoenix Open	Arizona	20,000,000	(United States) Scottie Scheffler (5)	65.27		Designated event
Feb 19	Genesis Invitational	California	20,000,000	(Spain) Jon Rahm (10)	67.20		Designated event (Note: Also an invitational event)
Feb 26	The Honda Classic	Florida	8,400,000	(United States) Chris Kirk (5)	31.24		
Mar 5	Arnold Palmer Invitational	Florida	20,000,000	(United States) Kurt Kitayama (1)	67.28		Designated event
Mar 5	Puerto Rico Open	Puerto Rico	3,800,000	(Colombia) Nico Echavarría (1)	10.17		Alternate event
Mar 12	The Players Championship	Florida	25,000,000	(United States) Scottie Scheffler (6)	80		Flagship event
Mar 19	Valspar Championship	Florida	8,100,000	(United States) Taylor Moore (1)	37.07		
Mar 26	WGC-Dell Technologies Match Play	Texas	20,000,000	(United States) Sam Burns (5)	52.41		World Golf Championship (Note: Also a designated event)
Mar 26	Corales Puntacana Championship	Dominican Republic	3,800,000	(England) Matt Wallace (1)	15.80		Alternate event
Apr 2	Valero Texas Open	Texas	8,900,000	(Canada) Corey Conners (2)	35.98		
Apr 9	Masters Tournament	Georgia	18,000,000	(Spain) Jon Rahm (11)	100		Major championship
Apr 16	RBC Heritage	South Carolina	20,000,000	(England) Matt Fitzpatrick (2)	67.41		Designated event
Apr 23	Zurich Classic of New Orleans	Louisiana	8,600,000	(United States) Nick Hardy (1) and (United States) Davis Riley (1)	n/a		Team event
Apr 30	Mexico Open	Mexico	7,700,000	(United States) Tony Finau (6)	29.78		
May 7	Wells Fargo Championship	North Carolina	20,000,000	(United States) Wyndham Clark (1)	63.59		Designated event
May 14	AT&T Byron Nelson	Texas	9,500,000	(Australia) Jason Day (13)	36.15		
May 21	PGA Championship	New York	17,500,000	(United States) Brooks Koepka (9)	100		Major championship
May 28	Charles Schwab Challenge	Texas	8,700,000	(Argentina) Emiliano Grillo (2)	47.41		Invitational
Jun 4	Memorial Tournament	Ohio	20,000,000	(Norway) Viktor Hovland (4)	64.72		Designated event
Jun 11	RBC Canadian Open	Canada	9,000,000	(Canada) Nick Taylor (3)	36.63		
Jun 18	U.S. Open	California	20,000,000	(United States) Wyndham Clark (2)	100		Major championship
Jun 25	Travelers Championship	Connecticut	20,000,000	(United States) Keegan Bradley (6)	69.48		Designated event
Jul 2	Rocket Mortgage Classic	Michigan	8,800,000	(United States) Rickie Fowler (6)	41.97		
Jul 9	John Deere Classic	Illinois	7,400,000	(Austria) Sepp Straka (2)	33.29		
Jul 16	Genesis Scottish Open	Scotland	9,000,000	(Northern Ireland) Rory McIlroy (24)	62.26	EUR (Note: European Tour Rolex Series)	
Jul 16	Barbasol Championship	Kentucky	3,800,000	(Sweden) Vincent Norrman (1)	15.95	EUR	Alternate event
Jul 23	The Open Championship	England	16,500,000	(United States) Brian Harman (3)	100		Major championship
Jul 23	Barracuda Championship	California	3,800,000	(United States) Akshay Bhatia (1)	23.76	EUR	Alternate event
Jul 30	3M Open	Minnesota	7,800,000	(United States) Lee Hodges (1)	39.28		
Aug 6	Wyndham Championship	North Carolina	7,600,000	(United States) Lucas Glover (5)	42.76		
Aug 13	FedEx St. Jude Championship	Tennessee	20,000,000	(United States) Lucas Glover (6)	56.08		FedEx Cup playoff event
Aug 20	BMW Championship	Illinois	20,000,000	(Norway) Viktor Hovland (5)	50.22		FedEx Cup playoff event
Aug 27	Tour Championship	Georgia	n/a (Note: The Tour Championship has no stand-alone purse and does not carry official money; the tournament directly determines the assignment of the FedEx Cup bonus pool money, including US$18 million to the winner.)	(Norway) Viktor Hovland (6)	44.12 (Note: OWGR points at the Tour Championship were awarded based on aggregate scores only (see Tour Championship format). Hovland and Xander Schauffele tied for the lowest aggregate score and split the assigned points for first and second places, each earning 35.29 points.)		FedEx Cup playoff event
Sep 17	Fortinet Championship	California	8,400,000	(United States) Sahith Theegala (1)	31.27		FedEx Cup Fall
Oct 8	Sanderson Farms Championship	Mississippi	8,200,000	(United States) Luke List (2)	28.92		FedEx Cup Fall
Oct 15	Shriners Children's Open	Nevada	8,400,000	(South Korea) Tom Kim (3)	33.83		FedEx Cup Fall
Oct 22	Zozo Championship	Japan	8,500,000	(United States) Collin Morikawa (6)	30.19	JPN	FedEx Cup Fall
Nov 5	World Wide Technology Championship	Mexico	8,200,000	(South Africa) Erik van Rooyen (2)	30.00		FedEx Cup Fall
Nov 12	Butterfield Bermuda Championship	Bermuda	6,500,000	(Colombia) Camilo Villegas (5)	19.24		FedEx Cup Fall
Nov 19	RSM Classic	Georgia	8,400,000	(Sweden) Ludvig Åberg (1)	37.33		FedEx Cup Fall

=== Unofficial events ===
The following events were sanctioned by the PGA Tour, but did not carry FedEx Cup points or official money, nor were wins official.

Date	Tournament	Location	Purse ($)	Winner(s)	OWGR points	Notes
Sep 25	Presidents Cup	North Carolina	n/a	Team USA	n/a	Team event
Dec 4	Hero World Challenge	Bahamas	3,500,000	(Norway) Viktor Hovland	29.84	Limited-field event
Dec 11	QBE Shootout	Florida	3,800,000	(United States) Tom Hoge and (United States) Sahith Theegala	n/a	Team event
Oct 1	Ryder Cup	Italy	n/a	Team Europe	n/a	Team event
Dec 3	Hero World Challenge	Bahamas	4,500,000	(United States) Scottie Scheffler	30.10	Limited-field event
Dec 10	Grant Thornton Invitational	Florida	4,000,000	(Australia) Jason Day and (New Zealand) Lydia Ko	n/a	New team event
Dec 17	PNC Championship	Florida	1,085,000	(Germany) Bernhard Langer and son Jason Langer	n/a	Team event

== Location of tournaments ==
PGA Tour sanctioned events (numbered chronologically)

Legend:
600-point event (Major championships & The Players)
550-point event (World Golf Championships, SToC, Genesis, Arnold Palmer, Memorial)
500-point event (Regular events)
400-point event (Official team event)
300-point event (Alternate events)
FedEx Cup playoff event

Non FedEx Cup event
1 Fortinet Championship
2 Presidents Cup
3 Sanderson Farms Championship
4 Shriners Hospitals for Children Open
5 Zozo Championship
6 CJ Cup
7 Bermuda Championship
8 Mayakoba Golf Classic
9 Houston Open
10 RSM Classic
11 Hero World Challenge
12 QBE Shootout
13 Sentry Tournament of Champions
14 Sony Open in Hawaii
15 The American Express
16 Farmers Insurance Open
17 AT&T Pebble Beach Pro-Am
18 WM Phoenix Open
19 Genesis Invitational
20 The Honda Classic
21 Arnold Palmer Invitational
22 Puerto Rico Open
23 The Players Championship
24 Valspar Championship
25 WGC-Dell Technologies Match Play
26 Corales Puntacana Championship
27 Valero Texas Open
28 Masters Tournament
29 RBC Heritage
30 Zurich Classic of New Orleans
31 Mexican Open
32 Wells Fargo Championship
33 AT&T Byron Nelson
34 PGA Championship
35 Charles Schwab Challenge
36 Memorial Tournament
37 RBC Canadian Open
38 U.S. Open
39 Travelers Championship
40 Rocket Mortgage Classic
41 John Deere Classic
42 Genesis Scottish Open
43 Barbasol Championship
44 The Open Championship
45 Barracuda Championship
46 3M Open
47 Wyndham Championship
48 FedEx St. Jude Championship
49 BMW Championship
50 Tour Championship
PGA Tour sanctioned events in the United Kingdom
PGA Tour sanctioned events in Hawaii
PGA Tour sanctioned events in Japan

== FedEx Cup ==
=== Points distribution ===
The distribution of points for 2022–23 PGA Tour events were as follows:

Finishing position	1st	2nd	3rd	4th	5th	6th	7th	8th	9th	10th	20th	30th	40th	50th	60th
Majors & Players Championship	600	330	210	150	120	110	100	94	88	82	51	32	18	10	6
WGCs, SToC, Genesis, Arnold Palmer, and Memorial	550	315	200	140	115	105	95	89	83	78	51	32	18	10	6
Other PGA Tour events	500	300	190	135	110	100	90	85	80	75	45	28	16	8.5	5
Team event (each player)	400	163	105	88	78	68	59	54	50	46	17	5	2	0	0
Alternate events	300	165	105	80	65	60	55	50	45	40	28	17	10	5	3
Playoff events	2000	1200	760	540	440	400	360	340	320	300	180	112	64	34	20

Tour Championship starting score (to par), based on position in the FedEx Cup rankings after the BMW Championship:

Position	1st	2nd	3rd	4th	5th	6th–10th	11th–15th	16th–20th	21st–25th	26th–30th
Starting score	−10	−8	−7	−6	−5	−4	−3	−2	−1	E

=== Final standings ===
For full rankings, see 2023 FedEx Cup Playoffs.

Final FedEx Cup standings of the 30 qualifiers for the Tour Championship:

Pos.	Player		Majors & The Players					WGCs, Tournament of Champions, Genesis, Arnold Palmer, and Memorial						Top 10s in other PGA Tour events							Regular season points	Playoffs (Note: The top 70 point scorers in the regular season retain their tour card for the following season, and qualify for the FedEx St. Jude Championship. The top 50 points scorers after FedEx St. Jude Championship qualify for the BMW Championship.)		Total points	Tour C'ship (Note: The top 30 point scorers after the BMW Championship qualify for the Tour Championship. Each player begins with a score adjustment to par determined by their point ranking, the lowest scorers in the Tour Championship in addition to this adjustment win the FedEx Cup.)		Tmts	Money ($m) (Note: In addition to tournament prize money, the top 10 regular season point scorers receive a share of a $10m bonus, and the $75m FedEx Cup postseason bonus money is distributed based upon standings after the Tour Championship.)		
Pos.	Nat.	Name	Ply	Mas	PGA	USO	Opn	WGC Cha	ToC	Gen	API	WGC MP	Mem	1	2	3	4	5	6	7	Regular season points	FStJ	BMW	Total points	Start	Final	Tmts	Basic	CB Top10	FedEx Bonus
1	(Norway)	Hovland	T3	T6	T2	19	T13	C A N C E L E D	T18	T20	T10	T31	1	T5	T10						1,795	T13	1	4,024	−8	−27	23	14.11	1.40	18.00
2	(United States)	Schauffele	T19	T10	T18	T10	T17	C A N C E L E D	WD	T33	T39	T5	T24	T9	T10	T5	T4	2			1,406	T24	T8	1,866	−3	−22	22	8.46		6.50
3	(United States)	Clark	T27	•	CUT	1	T33	C A N C E L E D	•	T33	T34	•	T12	T10	T10	5	6	3	1		1,944	T66	T15	2,157	−4	−16	28	10.76	2.00	5.00
4	(Northern Ireland)	McIlroy	CUT	CUT	T7	2	T6	C A N C E L E D	•	T29	T2	3	T7	1	T9	T7	1				2,304	3	4	3,494	−7	−14	18	13.92	2.40	4.00
5	(United States)	Cantlay	T19	T14	T9	T14	T33	C A N C E L E D	T16	3	T4	T9	T30	T2	3	T4	T4				1,443	2	T15	2,843	−4	−13	21	10.38		3.00
T6	(England)	Fleetwood	T27	33	T18	T5	T10	C A N C E L E D	•	T20	T61	T52	•	T4	T3	T5	2	T6			1,184	T4	T25	1,967	−3	−11	21	6.51		2.00
T6	(United States)	Morikawa	T13	T10	T26	T14	CUT	C A N C E L E D	2	T6	CUT	T28	WD	3	T2						1,246	T13	T25	1,609	−1	−11	24	7.57		2.00
T6	(United States)	Scheffler	1	T10	T2	3	T23	C A N C E L E D	T7	T12	T4	4	3	T3	T9	1	T5	T3	T4	T3	3,146	T31	T2	4,218	−10	−11	23	21.01	3.00	2.00
T9	(United States)	Bradley	CUT	T23	T29	CUT	CUT	C A N C E L E D	34	CUT	T10	T28	T30	T5	1	2	1				1,774	T43	T29	1,993	−3	−10	23	9.01	1.20	0.99
T9	(United States)	Burns	T35	T29	CUT	T32	CUT	C A N C E L E D	T32	CUT	CUT	1	T16	T7	T6	6	T6				1,335	T52	T15	1,561	E	−10	26	7.14		0.99
T9	(England)	Fitzpatrick	CUT	T10	CUT	T17	T41	C A N C E L E D	T7	CUT	T14	T31	T9	1							1,049	T66	T2	2,043	−4	−10	23	8.14		0.99
T9	(United States)	Homa	T6	T43	T55	CUT	T10	C A N C E L E D	T3	2	T14	T9	•	1	1	T8	T9				2,128	T6	T5	2,871	−4	−10	24	10.76	2.20	0.99
T9	(United States)	Schenk	CUT	•	CUT	CUT	CUT	C A N C E L E D	•	T50	T31	•	T7	2	2	7	T4				1,213	T6	T34	1,620	−1	−10	33	4.99		0.99
T14	(United States)	Henley	T19	T4	CUT	T14	CUT	C A N C E L E D	•	CUT	T53	17	T16	1	T2						1,296	T6	T8	1,948	−3	−9	24	6.33		0.78
T14	(Austria)	Straka	T65	T46	T7	CUT	T2	C A N C E L E D	•	T45	CUT	T59	T16	2	T5	1					1,413	63	T37	1,503	E	−9	28	5.29		0.78
T16	(United States)	Fowler	T13	•	CUT	T5	T23	C A N C E L E D	•	T20	T31	T17	T9	T6	T2	T10	T10	T6	1		1,732	T58	T25	1,885	−3	−8	25	7.86	1.10	0.71
T16	(England)	Hatton	2	T34	T15	T27	T20	C A N C E L E D	•	T40	T4	T59	T12	T6	T3	T5	T3	T6			1,381	T43	T34	1,509	E	−8	21	8.34	(Note: Hatton won a further US$1,000,000 by topping the Aon Risk Reward Challenge standings.)	0.71
T18	(United States)	Glover	T51	•	•	•	•	C A N C E L E D	•	CUT	CUT	•	CUT	T4	T6	5	1				885	1	T22	3,041	−5	−7	28	6.38		0.67
T18	(Spain)	Rahm	WD	1	T50	T10	T2	C A N C E L E D	1	1	T39	T31	T16	T4	1	T7	3	2			3,320	T37	T31	3,486	−6	−7	20	16.52	4.00	0.67
T20	(United States)	Finau	T19	T26	T72	T32	CUT	C A N C E L E D	T7	T20	T24	T17	•	1	T7	T9	1	T7			1,655	64	T37	1,744	−2	−6	24	5.87	1.00	0.62
T20	(South Korea)	S. W. Kim	T27	T29	CUT	T39	CUT	C A N C E L E D	•	CUT	T39	T17	4	T8	1	T7	T2				1,372	T16	T31	1,672	−2	−6	28	5.40		0.62
T20	(South Korea)	T. Kim	T51	T16	CUT	T8	T2	C A N C E L E D	T5	T45	T34	T31	CUT	1	T6	T7	T6				1,422	T24	T10	1,814	−2	−6	26	7.78		0.62
23	(United States)	Harman	T44	CUT	CUT	T43	1	C A N C E L E D	T16	CUT	CUT	T17	CUT	2	T7	T2					1,827	T31	T5	2,339	−4	−4	27	9.18	1.70	0.58
24	(South Korea)	Im	T6	T16	CUT	CUT	T20	C A N C E L E D	T13	T56	T21	T17	T41	7	T4	T6	T7	6	T8		1,098	T6	7	1,780	−2	−3	30	6.67		0.57
25	(Canada)	Taylor	CUT	•	CUT	CUT	CUT	C A N C E L E D	•	T33	CUT	T31	•	T6	T7	2	T10	2	1		1,463	T24	47	1,633	−1	−2	28	6.24		0.55
26	(Canada)	Conners	CUT	CUT	T12	CUT	T52	C A N C E L E D	•	61	T21	T17	CUT	1	T8	T9					1,103	T6	T10	1,688	−2	−1	24	5.55		0.54
27	(United States)	Spieth	T19	T4	T29	CUT	T23	C A N C E L E D	T13	CUT	T4	T31	T5	T6	T3	2					1,099	T6	T34	1,506	E	+1	22	7.24		0.53
28	(Australia)	Day	T19	T39	CUT	CUT	T2	C A N C E L E D	•	T9	T10	T5	CUT	T8	T7	5	1				1,506	T52	T45	1,574	−1	+3	24	6.92		0.52
T29	(Argentina)	Grillo	CUT	•	CUT	CUT	T6	C A N C E L E D	•	T67	T39	•	T48	T5	4	T7	T5	1	T10		1,275	T20	T31	1,543	E	+6	29	5.48		0.51
T29	(United States)	Moore	T35	T39	T72	CUT	CUT	C A N C E L E D	•	CUT	T39	•	•	1	T4	T4					1,193	5	49	1,669	−1	+6	30	5.08		0.51

Win
Top 10
Made cut
Missed cut
Withdrew or disqualified
• Did not play

== Money list ==
The money list was based on prize money won during the season, calculated in U.S. dollars.

Position	Player	Prize money ($)
1	(United States) Scottie Scheffler	21,014,342
2	(Spain) Jon Rahm	16,522,608
3	(Norway) Viktor Hovland	14,112,235
4	(Northern Ireland) Rory McIlroy	13,921,008
5	(United States) Max Homa	10,761,517
6	(United States) Wyndham Clark	10,757,490
7	(United States) Patrick Cantlay	10,372,998
8	(United States) Brian Harman	9,175,262
9	(United States) Keegan Bradley	9,010,040
10	(United States) Xander Schauffele	8,459,066

== Awards ==
Award	Winner	Ref.
Player of the Year (Jack Nicklaus Trophy)	(United States) Scottie Scheffler	
Rookie of the Year (Arnold Palmer Award)	(United States) Eric Cole	
Scoring leader (Byron Nelson Award)	(United States) Scottie Scheffler	
PGA Tour Courage Award	(United States) Chris Kirk	

== See also ==
- 2022 in golf
- 2023 Korn Ferry Tour
- 2023 PGA Tour Champions season
