= Christiaan Maas =

South African professional golfer (born 2003)

Personal information
- Nationality: South Africa
- Born: 19 September 2003 (age 23) Pretoria, South Africa

Career
- Sport: Golf
- College: University of Texas at Austin
- Turned professional: 2026
- Current tour: Korn Ferry Tour
- Professional wins: 1

Achievements and awards
- Big 12 Conference Newcomer of the Year: 2023

Christiaan Maas (born 19 September 2003) is a South African professional golfer. He won the 2022 Brabazon Trophy and the 2025 Eisenhower Trophy.

== Early life and amateur career ==
Maas was born in Pretoria in 2003. He won the 2021 South African Amateur Championship, the 2022 English Men's Open Amateur Stroke Play Championship for the Brabazon Trophy, and lost the final of the 2023 Western Amateur to Kazuma Kobori one up. Maas also lost a three-way playoff at the 2024 Africa Amateur Championship to Altin van der Merwe, who birdied the first hole in a sudden-death playoff.

Maas has successfully represented South Africa in the World Amateur Team Championships for the Eisenhower Trophy three times. In 2023, his team with Christo Lamprecht and Altin van der Merwe finished 7th in Abu Dhabi. In 2025 in Singapore, he led South Africa to the win by 8 ahead of Australia as he shot 22-under par, ten shots clear of the nearest competitor.

Maas enrolled at the University of Texas at Austin in 2022 to play with the Texas Longhorns men's golf team. He was named Big 12 Conference Newcomer of the Year, and one of five finalists for the Jack Nicklaus Player of the Year Award and the Gary Player Award as a junior.

Maas has also performed well at professional events. He finished top-25 at the Alfred Dunhill Championship in both 2022 and 2023. In 2025, he tied for 4th at the Investec South African Open Championship, two strokes behind winner Dylan Naidoo, after carding a second-round 64. He finished top-10 at the 2026 Hero Dubai Desert Classic, won by Patrick Reed, after which he rose to 4th in the World Amateur Golf Rankings.

== Professional career ==
Maas turned professional in 2026 after graduating from Texas. He finished second in the PGA Tour University rankings which earned him a Korn Ferry Tour card for the remainder of 2026.

== Amateur wins ==
- 2019 Dimension Data Junior Open
- 2020 Inland National Order of Merit #1, Silver Salver
- 2021 Inland National Order of Merit #1, Gauteng North Open, South African Amateur Championship, Cape Province Open, KwaZulu-Natal Open Strokeplay, Silver Salver
- 2022 Brabazon Trophy
- 2024 NCAA Austin Regional
- 2025 Pauma Valley Invitational, Eisenhower Trophy (Individual)
- 2026 Southern Highlands Collegiate

== Professional wins (1) ==
=== Big Easy Tour wins (1) ===
No.	Date	Tournament	Winning score	Margin of victory	Runner-up
1	12 May 2022	Altron Big Easy Tour 1 (as an amateur)	−13 (65-69-69=203)	3 strokes	(South Africa) Bradley Diggeden

== Team appearances ==
Amateur

- Eisenhower Trophy (representing South Africa): 2022, 2023, 2025 (winners)
- Arnold Palmer Cup (representing the International team): 2023
- Spirit International Amateur (representing South Africa): 2024
