= Eric Axley =

American professional golfer (born 1974)

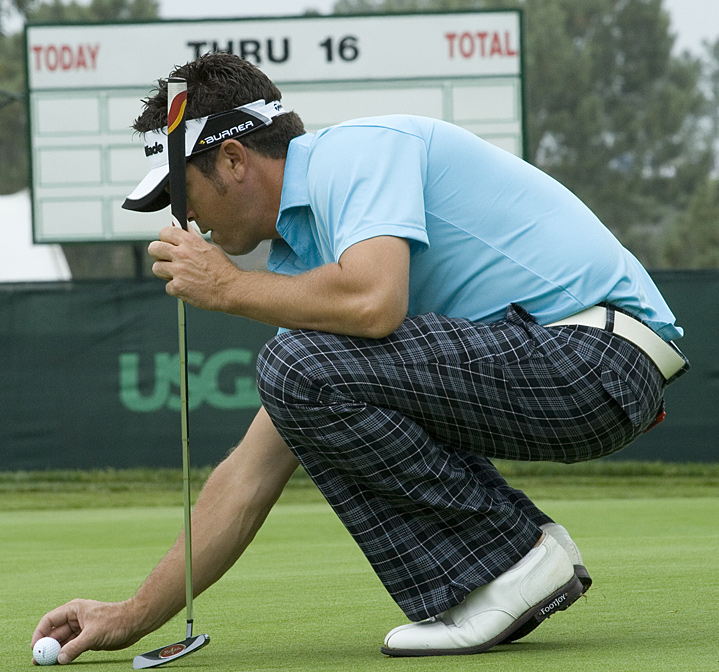

Personal information
- Full name: Eric Allen Axley
- Nationality: United States
- Born: April 22, 1974 (age 52) Athens, Tennessee, U.S.
- Height: 6 ft 0 in (1.83 m)
- Weight: 185 lb (84 kg; 13.2 st)
- Children: 2

Career
- Sport: Golf
- College: East Tennessee State
- Turned professional: 1997
- Current tour: Korn Ferry Tour
- Former tours: PGA Tour; NGA Hooters Tour
- Professional wins: 5

Number of wins by tour
- PGA Tour: 1
- Korn Ferry Tour: 2

Best results in major championships
- Masters Tournament: DNP
- PGA Championship: CUT: 2007
- U.S. Open: T9: 2008
- The Open Championship: DNP

Eric Allen Axley (born April 22, 1974) is an American professional golfer.

== Early life ==
Axley was born in Athens, Tennessee.

== Professional career ==
In 1997, Axley turned professional. He is one of the few natural left-handers to win on the Web.com Tour and PGA Tour.

In 2006, Axley won the Valero Texas Open, claiming his first PGA Tour win. After a poor 2009 season, Axley lost his PGA Tour playing rights. Axley divided his time among the NGA Hooters Tour, eGolf Professional Tour, Web.com Tour, and PGA Tour.

In 2014, Axley tried to play his way back to the PGA Tour through Monday qualifying and past champion status. Axley made seven cuts in ten events and finished 184th in the FedEx Cup standings, good enough for a trip to the Web.com Tour Finals. Axley finished 50th, the last position to earn a PGA Tour card and his first in five years, by just $31.66. After barely gaining a PGA Tour card, he barely missed getting it back for the 2015–16 season, just $101 behind Rob Oppenheim.

== Professional wins (5) ==
=== PGA Tour wins (1) ===
No.	Date	Tournament	Winning score	Margin of victory	Runners-up
1	Sep 24, 2006	Valero Texas Open	−15 (68-63-63-71=265)	3 strokes	(United States) Anthony Kim, (England) Justin Rose, (United States) Dean Wilson

=== Web.com Tour wins (2) ===
No.	Date	Tournament	Winning score	Margin of victory	Runner(s)-up
1	May 8, 2005	Rex Hospital Open	−14 (69-67-67-67=270)	2 strokes	(United States) Troy Matteson
2	Apr 22, 2018	North Mississippi Classic	−12 (71-65-68=204) (Note: Shortened to 54 holes due to weather.)	3 strokes	(South Korea) Lee Kyoung-hoon, (Colombia) Sebastián Muñoz, (United States) Will Wilcox

Web.com Tour playoff record (0–1)

No.	Year	Tournament	Opponents	Result
1	2017	Lincoln Land Charity Championship	(United States) William Kropp, (United States) Adam Schenk, (United States) Kyle Thompson	Schenk won with birdie on second extra hole

=== NGA Hooters Tour wins (2) ===
No.	Date	Tournament	Winning score	Margin of victory	Runner(s)-up
1	Apr 27, 2002	Northwest Arkansas Classic	−9 (67-70-70=207)	Playoff	(United States) Todd Murphy, (United States) Mark Side, (United States) Travis Womble
2	Aug 18, 2002	Grand Casino Championship	−17 (68-68-67-68=271)	1 stroke	(United States) Pat Nanney Jr.

== Results in major championships ==
Tournament	2004	2005	2006	2007	2008	2009
Masters Tournament						
U.S. Open	CUT	CUT		CUT	T9	CUT
The Open Championship						
PGA Championship				CUT		

Tournament	2010	2011	2012	2013	2014	2015	2016	2017	2018
Masters Tournament									
U.S. Open	T63								CUT
The Open Championship									
PGA Championship									

Top 10
Did not play

CUT = missed the half-way cut
"T" = tied

== Results in The Players Championship ==
Tournament	2007	2008	2009
The Players Championship	CUT		CUT

Did not play

CUT = missed the half-way cut

== See also ==
- 2005 Nationwide Tour graduates
- 2014 Web.com Tour Finals graduates
