= North Mississippi Classic =

Tournament information
- Location: Oxford, Mississippi
- Established: 2018
- Course: Country Club of Oxford
- Par: 72
- Length: 7,028 yards (6,426 m)
- Tour: Web.com Tour
- Format: Stroke play
- Prize fund: US$550,000
- Month played: April
- Final year: 2018

Tournament record score
- Aggregate: 204 Eric Axley (2018)
- To par: −12 as above

Final champion
- (United States) Eric Axley

Location map
- Location in the United States Location in Mississippi

The North Mississippi Classic was a golf tournament on the Web.com Tour. It was played in April 2018 at the Country Club of Oxford in Oxford, Mississippi.

== Winners ==
Year	Winner	Score	To par	Margin of victory	Runners-up
2018	(United States) Eric Axley	204 (Note: Shortened to 54 holes due to weather.)	−12	3 strokes	(South Korea) Lee Kyoung-hoon (Colombia) Sebastián Muñoz (United States) Will Wilcox
