= 2025 Eisenhower Trophy =

Golf tournament

Tournament information
- Dates: 8–11 October 2025
- Location: Singapore; 1°20′N 103°59′E
- Course: Tanah Merah Country Club (Tampines Course)
- Organized by: International Golf Federation
- Format: 72 holes stroke play

Statistics
- Par: 72
- Length: 7,532 yards (6,887 m)
- Field: 36 teams 108 players

Champion
- South Africa; Charl Barnard, Daniel Bennett, Christiaan Maas
- 547 (−29)
- Location in Southeast Asia Location south of Malaysia Location in Singapore

The 2025 Eisenhower Trophy took place 8–11 October at Tanah Merah Country Club (Tampines Course) in Singapore. It was the 34th men's golf World Amateur Team Championship for the Eisenhower Trophy.

Team South Africa won the championship.

== Format ==
The tournament was played over 72 holes of strokeplay with the two best scores of each team in each round counting to the team total.

== Venue ==
Since the first course of the club was opened in 1984, the club had hosted the Singapore Open on the PGA Tour of Australasia, the Johnnie Walker Classic on the European Tour and the HSBC Women's Champions on the LPGA Tour. The second course of the club, the Tampines Course, was planned and build shortly after the first course, opened in 1988, and redeveloped in 2017 by Phil Jacobs Design.

=== Course layout ===
Tee location on each hole varied so specified hole length is approximate.

Hole	Meters	Par	Hole	Meters	Par
1	352	4	10	547	5
2	469	4	11	384	4
3	406	4	12	398	4
4	232	3	13	390	4
5	581	5	14	178	3
6	158	3	15	463	4
7	392	4	16	143	3
8	520	5	17	397	4
9	305	4	18	572	5
Out	3,415	36	In	3,472	36
Source:		Total		6,887	72

== Teams ==
36 teams, each representing a different nation, entered the competition. Each team consisted of three players. Teams that finished in the top ten of the 2023 Eisenhower Trophy were automatically qualified, as was the host country, Singapore. The remainder of the field was filled based on the World Amateur Golf Ranking of the two top players from each nation.

A minimum representation was assured of teams from the regions of Africa, the Americas, Asia, Europe and Oceania.

Country	Players
Argentina	Juan Martín Loureiro, Segundo Oliva Pinto, Mateo Pulcini
Australia	Billy Dowling, Declan O'Donovan, Harry Takis
Brazil	Andrey Borges, Eduardo Ferreira, Herik Oliveira
Canada	Isaiah Ibit, Justin Matthews, Ashton McCulloch
China	Hauyi Wang, Qiyou Wu, Ziqin Zhou
Colombia	Carlos Ardila, Tomas Restrepo, Emilio Velez
Czech Republic	Timotej Formánek, Filip Jakubčík, Štěpán Plášek
Denmark	Claes Thrane Borregaard, Oscar Holm Bredkjær, Kristian Hjort Bressum
England	Eliot Baker, Charlie Forster, Tyler Weaver
Estonia	Kevin Christopher Jegers, Richard Teder, Mattias Varjun
France	Louis Anceaux, Oscar Couilleau, Hugo Le Goff
Germany	Wolfgang Glawe, Emil Riegger, Tim Wiedemeyer
Guam	Redge Camacho, Markus Nanpei, Ivan Sablan
Guatemala	Sebastian Barnoya, Gabriel Palacios, Alejandro Villavicencio
India	Arin Ahuja, Rakshit Dahiya, Deepak Yadav
Indonesia	Asa Najib Bhakti, Randy Arbenata Bintang, Amadeus Christian Susanto
Ireland	John Doyle, Stuart Grehan, Caolan Rafferty
Italy	Riccardo Fantinelli, Michele Ferrero, Filippo Ponzano
Japan	Taishi Moto, Taisei Nagasaki, Rintaro Nakano
Mexico	Carlos Astiazaran, Eduardo Derbez, Gerardo Gomez
Morocco	Adam Bresnu, Alexandre El Khomri, Hugo Mazen Trommetter
Netherlands	Guus Lafeber, Benjamin Reuter, Nevill Ruiter
New Zealand	Cooper Moore, Zackary Swanwick, Robby Turnbull
Norway	Emil Børrestuen Herstad, Joachim Larsen Tegner, Michael Mjaaseth
Panama	Raul Carbonell, Miguel Ordoñez, Omar Tejeira
Paraguay	Erich Fortlage (playing captain), Benjamin Fernandez, Franco Fernandez
Scotland	Cameron Adam, Connor Graham, Niall Shiels-Donegan
Singapore	Brayden Lee, Troy Storm, Hiroshi Hirahara Tai
South Africa	Charl Barnard, Daniel Bennett, Christiaan Maas
Spain	Alejandro De Castro Piera, Sergio Jimenez Romero, Alvaro Pastor Roman
Sweden	Alfons Bondesson, Filip Fahlberg Johnsson, Simon Hovdal
Thailand	Arsit Areephun, Pongsapak Laopakdee, Parin Sarasmut
United States	Ethan Fang, Mason Howell, Preston Stout
Vietnam	Anh Huy Ho, Anh Minh Nguyen, Tuan Anh Nguyen
Wales	Jonathan Bale, Tomi Bowen, Caolan Burford
Zimbabwe	Munesu Tadiswa Chimhini, Darlington Chikanyambidze, Elton Dancel Zulu

== Results ==
Team standings after first round
Place	Country	Score	To par
1	Mexico	137	−7
2	South Africa	139	−5
3	France	140	−4
T4	Australia	141	−3
T4	Czech Republic	141	−3
T4	Singapore	141	−3
T4	Sweden	141	−3
T8	England	142	−2
T8	Italy	142	−2
T8	Netherlands	142	−2
T8	Paraguay	142	−2
T8	Thailand	142	−2

Individual leaders after first round
Place	Player	Country	Score	To par
1	Hiroshi Hirahara Tai	Singapore	65	−7
2	Christiaan Maas	South Africa	66	−6
3	Carlos Astiazaran	Mexico	68	−4
T4	Eduardo Derbez	Mexico	69	−3
T4	Filip Fahlberg Johnsson	Sweden	69	−3
T4	Timotej Formánek	Czech Republic	69	−3
T4	Michael Mjaaseth	Norway	69	−3
T8	Oscar Couilleau	France	70	−2
T8	Erich Fortlage	Paraguay	70	−2
T8	Hugo Le Goff	France	70	−2
T8	Ashton McCulloch	Canada	70	−2
T8	Declan O'Donovan	Australia	70	−2
T8	Nevill Ruiter	Netherlands	70	−2
T8	Parin Sarasmut	Thailand	70	−2

Team standings after second round
Place	Country	Score	To par
1	South Africa	139-135=274	−14
T2	Australia	141-138=279	−9
T2	England	142-137=279	−9
T2	France	140-139=279	−9
T5	Denmark	144-136=280	−8
T5	Mexico	137-143=280	−8
T7	Czech Republic	141-140=281	−7
T7	Sweden	141-140=281	−7
T9	Japan	145-137=282	−6
T9	Thailand	142-140=282	−6

Individual leaders after second round
Place	Player	Country	Score	To par
1	Christiaan Maas	South Africa	66-66=132	−12
2	Hiroshi Hirahara Tai	Singapore	65-71=136	−8
T3	Oscar Couilleau	France	70-67=137	−7
T3	Rintaro Nakano	Japan	71-66=137	−7
T5	Filip Fahlberg Johnsson	Sweden	69-69=138	−6
T5	Oscar Holm Bredkjær	Denmark	71-67=138	−6
T7	Carlos Astiazaran	Mexico	68-71=139	−5
T7	Adam Bresnu	Morocco	71-68=139	−5
T7	Michael Mjaaseth	Norway	69-70=139	−5
T7	Declan O'Donovan	Australia	70-69=139	−5

Team standings after third round
Place	Country	Score	To par
1	South Africa	139-135-132=406	−26
2	Australia	141-138-138=417	−15
2	Mexico	137-143-137=417	−15
4	England	142-137-141=420	−12
5	France	140-139-142=421	−11
6	Denmark	144-136-143=423	−9
6	Thailand	142-140-141=423	−9
8	Japan	145-137-143=425	−7
9	Italy	142-144-140=426	−6
T10	Argentina	146-137-144=427	−5
T10	Czech Republic	141-140-146=427	−5
T10	Netherlands	142-143-142=427	−5
T10	Scotland	147-140-140=427	−5

Individual leaders after third round
Place	Player	Country	Score	To par
1	Christiaan Maas	South Africa	66-66-65=197	−19
2	Michael Mjaaseth	Norway	69-70-68=207	−9
2	Declan O'Donovan	Australia	70-69-68=207	−9
4	Oscar Couilleau	France	70-67-71=208	−8
5	Daniel Bennett	South Africa	73-69-67=209	−7
5	Adam Bresnu	Morocco	71-68-70=209	−7
7	Oscar Holm Bredkjær	Denmark	71-67-72=210	−6
7	Tyler Weaver	England	73-68-69=210	−6
9	Eduardo Derbez	Mexico	69-78-64=211	−5
9	Filip Fahlberg Johnsson	Sweden	69-69-73=211	−5
9	Hiroshi Hirahara Tai	Singapore	65-71-75=211	−5

Team standings after final round
Place	Country	Score	To par
1st place, gold medalist(s)	South Africa	139-135-132-141=547	−29
2nd place, silver medalist(s)	Australia	141-138-138-138=555	−21
3rd place, bronze medalist(s)	England	142-137-141-137=557	−19
4	Mexico	137-143-137-142=559	−17
5	France	140-139-142-140=561	−15
6	Netherlands	142-143-142-135=562	−14
T7	Denmark	144-136-143-142=565	−11
T7	Scotland	147-140-140-138=565	−11
T7	Thailand	142-140-141-142=565	−11
T10	Japan	145-137-143-142=567	−9
T10	United States	150-139-139-139=567	−9
12	Spain	144-149-136-139=568	−8
13	Paraguay	142-148-138-141=569	−7
T14	Czech Republic	141-140-146-143=570	−6
T14	New Zealand	144-144-143-139=570	−6
T16	Italy	142-144-140-145=571	−5
T16	Sweden	141-140-147-143=571	−5
T18	Norway	146-143-140-143=572	−4
T18	Singapore	141-144-147-140=572	−4
20	Morocco	147-139-145-143=574	−2
T21	China	144-144-147-141=576	E
T21	Guatemala	146-148-141-141=576	E
T21	Ireland	148-138-145-145=576	E
T24	Argentina	146-137-144-150=577	+1
T24	Canada	144-143-145-145=577	+1
26	Germany	148-143-144-144=579	+3
T27	Estonia	151-144-144-149=581	+5
T27	Colombia	147-144-143-149=581	+5
T27	Wales	146-140-146-149=581	+5
30	Vietnam	149-146-146-142=583	+7
31	Brazil	146-145-144-149=584	+8
32	Indonesia	149-148-144-148=589	+13
33	India	145-150-150-146=591	+15
34	Panama	150-150-147-150=597	+21
35	Guam	156-152-154-149=611	+35
36	Zimbabwe	155-161-154-155=625	+49

Individual leaders after final round
Place	Player	Country	Score	To par
1	Christiaan Maas	South Africa	66-66-65-69=266	−22
2	Declan O'Donovan	Australia	70-69-68-69=276	−12
T3	Adam Bresnu	Morocco	71-68-70-69=278	−10
T3	Oscar Couilleau	France	70-67-71-70=278	−10
5	Neville Ruiter	Netherlands	70-71-70-67=279	−9
T6	Eduardo Derbez	Mexico	69-78-64-69=280	−8
T6	Michael Mjaaseth	Norway	69-70-68-73=280	−8
T8	Daniel Bennett	South Africa	73-69-67-72=281	−7
T8	Filip Jakubčík	Czech Republic	72-68-74-67=281	−7
T8	Rintaro Nakano	Japan	71-66-75-69=281	−7

Note: There was no official award for the lowest individual score.

== See also ==
- 2025 Espirito Santo Trophy, the women's golf World Amateur Team Championship
