= 2016 PGA Tour Canada =

Golf tour season

2016 PGA Tour Canada season
- Duration: May 26, 2016 – September 18, 2016
- Number of official events: 12
- Most wins: (United States) Dan McCarthy (4)
- Order of Merit: (United States) Dan McCarthy

The 2016 PGA Tour Canada, titled as the 2016 Mackenzie Tour-PGA Tour Canada for sponsorship reasons, was the 31st season of the Canadian Tour, and the fourth under the operation and running of the PGA Tour.

== Schedule ==
The following table lists official events during the 2016 season.

Date	Tournament	Location	Purse (C$)	Winner (Note: The number in parentheses after each winner's name is the number of PGA Tour Canada events they had won up to and including that tournament. It is rare for someone to accumulate many wins on PGA Tour Canada as success at this level usually leads to promotion to the Web.com Tour.)	OWGR points
May 29	Freedom 55 Financial Open	British Columbia	175,000	(United States) Dan McCarthy (1)	6
Jun 5	Bayview Place Island Savings Open	British Columbia	175,000	(Canada) Adam Cornelson (1)	6
Jun 12	GolfBC Championship	British Columbia	175,000	(United States) Dan McCarthy (2)	6
Jun 26	SIGA Dakota Dunes Open	Saskatchewan	175,000	(Germany) Max Rottluff (1)	6
Jul 10	The Players Cup	Manitoba	175,000	(United States) Dan McCarthy (3)	6
Jul 17	Staal Foundation Open	Ontario	175,000	(United States) Taylor Moore (1)	6
Jul 31	Syncrude Oil Country Championship	Alberta	175,000	(United States) Aaron Wise (1)	6
Aug 7	ATB Financial Classic	Alberta	175,000	(England) Charlie Bull (1)	6
Aug 21	National Capital Open to Support Our Troops	Ontario	175,000	(United States) Brock Mackenzie (3)	6
Sep 4	Cape Breton Celtic Classic	Nova Scotia	175,000	(United States) Dan McCarthy (4)	6
Sep 11	Niagara Championship	Ontario	175,000	(United States) David Pastore (1)	6
Sep 18	Freedom 55 Financial Championship	Ontario	200,000	(France) Paul Barjon (1)	6

=== Unofficial events ===
The following events were sanctioned by the PGA Tour Canada, but did not carry official money, nor were wins official.

Date	Tournament	Location	Purse (C$)	Winner	OWGR points
Dec 17	Aruba Cup	Aruba	US$120,000	PGA Tour Latinoamérica	n/a

== Order of Merit ==
The Order of Merit was based on prize money won during the season, calculated in Canadian dollars. The top five players on the Order of Merit earned status to play on the 2017 Web.com Tour.

Position	Player	Prize money (C$)
1	(United States) Dan McCarthy	157,843
2	(United States) Brock Mackenzie	84,075
3	(United States) Taylor Moore	78,736
4	(United States) Aaron Wise	65,313
5	(Canada) Adam Cornelson	56,020

== See also ==
- 2016 PGA Tour China
- 2016 PGA Tour Latinoamérica
