= Hugo Le Goff =

French professional golfer

Personal information
- Nationality: France
- Born: 5 March 2008 (age 18) Fontainebleau, France

Career
- Sport: Golf
- Status: Amateur

Hugo Le Goff (born 5 March 2008) is a French amateur golfer. In 2025, he won the Spanish International Amateur Championship and the Lytham Trophy.

== Career ==
Le Goff is a member of Paris Country Club, and also resident of the Centre national de performance at Le Golf National.

In 2021, at only 13 years old, he won the Coupe Ganay, the French Native Amateur Championship. He reached the semi-finals of the R&A's Boys Amateur Championship in 2023.

Playing for France, he won the 2023 European Young Masters in Slovakia and the 2024 European Boys' Team Championship in Austria.

In 2025, Le Goff won the Spanish International Amateur Championship in March, beating Filippo Ponzano of Italy 5 and 3 in the final. In May, he birdied the last two holes to shoot a final round of 66 to win the 59th Lytham Trophy at Royal Lytham & St Annes Golf Club, England. Competing in the U.S., he finished tied 8th at the Junior Invitational and reached the round of 16 at the Western Amateur.

Le Goff played in the 2025 Junior Ryder Cup. He has committed to the University of Virginia.

== Amateur wins ==
- 2021 Championnat de France – Coupe Ganay, Triple A European Masters, Grand Prix d'Albret Trophee Bernard Betuing
- 2023 CJGA World Junior Challenge
- 2024 Grand Prix de Bayeux
- 2025 Spanish International Amateur Championship, Lytham Trophy

== Team appearances ==
Amateur

- European Young Masters (representing France): 2022, 2023 (winners)
- European Boys' Team Championship (representing France): 2022, 2023, 2024 (winners)
- European Nations Cup – Copa Sotogrande (representing France): 2023, 2024
- Jacques Léglise Trophy (representing the Continent of Europe): 2023 (winners), 2024 (winners), 2025 (winners)
- Eisenhower Trophy (representing France): 2023, 2025
- Spirit International Amateur (representing France): 2024
- European Amateur Team Championship (representing France): 2025, 2026
- St Andrews Trophy (representing the Continent of Europe): 2025
- Junior Ryder Cup (representing Europe): 2025
