= William Kropp =

American professional golfer (born 1990)

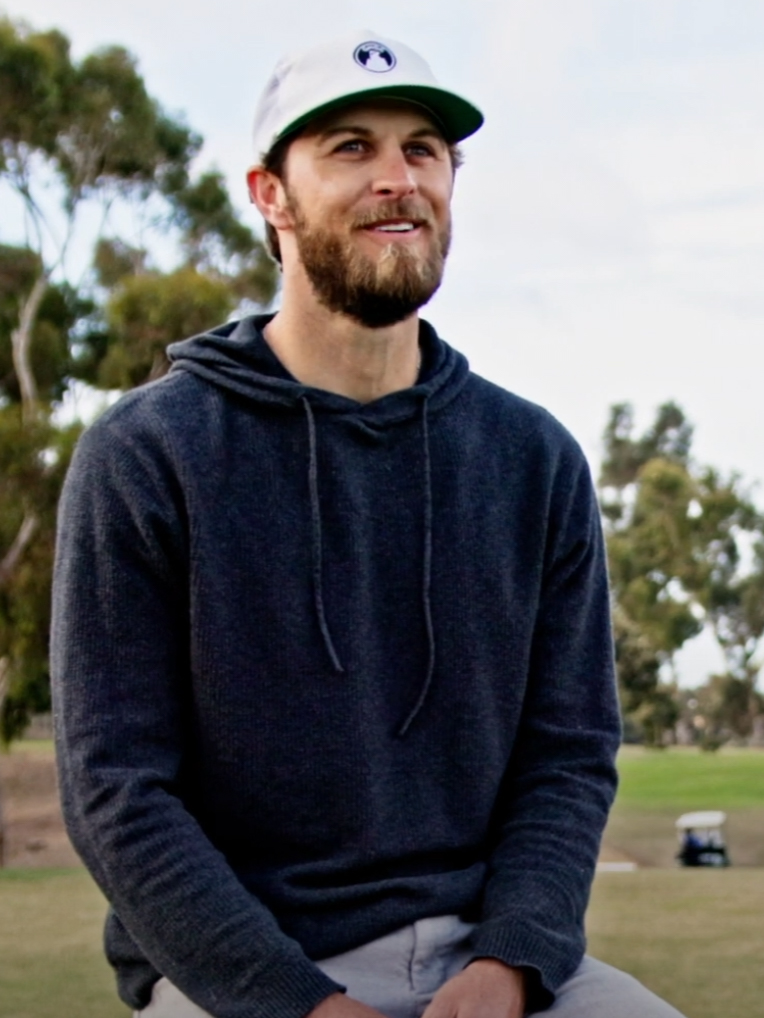
- Kropp in 2023

Personal information
- Full name: William Frederic Kropp
- Nationality: United States
- Born: March 12, 1990 (age 36) Indianapolis, Indiana, U.S.
- Height: 6 ft 1 in (1.85 m)
- Weight: 75 kg (165 lb; 11.8 st)

Career
- Sport: Golf
- College: University of Oklahoma
- Turned professional: 2013
- Current tour: Web.com Tour
- Former tour: PGA Tour Latinoamérica
- Professional wins: 2

William Kropp (born March 12, 1990) is an American professional golfer who plays on PGA Tour Latinoamérica.

Kropp turned professional in 2013 after having captained the Oklahoma Sooners golf team during his senior year at the University of Oklahoma. Kropp's first professional win came at the 2013 OK Kids Korral Championship on the Adams Pro Tour.

The win and other performances in 2013 earned Kropp his membership on PGA Tour Latinoamérica for the 2014 season. Kropp was quickly able to capitalize achieving his first win on the tour at the Abierto OSDE del Centro in just his fifth start on the tour. With this win, Kropp moved to number 617 and inside the top 1000 on the Official World Golf Ranking for the first time in his career. He also finished third at the Stella Artois Open and fifth at the Dominican Republic Open and tenth at the Brazil Open, ending tenth in the Order of Merit.

== Professional wins (2) ==
=== PGA Tour Latinoamérica wins (1) ===
| No. | Date | Tournament | Winning score | Margin of victory | Runner-up |
|---|---|---|---|---|---|
| 1 | Apr 20, 2014 | Abierto OSDE del Centro | −8 (73-66-68-69=276) | 1 stroke | (Argentina) Ángel Cabrera |

=== Adams Pro Tour wins (1) ===
- 2013 OK Kids Korral Championship

== Playoff record ==
Web.com Tour playoff record (0–1)

| No. | Year | Tournament | Opponents | Result |
|---|---|---|---|---|
| 1 | 2017 | Lincoln Land Charity Championship | (United States) Eric Axley, (United States) Adam Schenk, (United States) Kyle Thompson | Schenk won with birdie on second extra hole |
