= Africa Women's Amateur Invitational =

Tournament information
- Location: Rotates through Africa
- Established: 2024
- Course: Royal Johannesburg GC
- Par: 72
- Organized by: The R&A
- Format: Stroke play, 54 holes
- Month played: February

Current champion
- (South Africa) Lisa Coetzer

The Africa Women's Amateur Invitational is an annual amateur golf tournament run by The R&A, organizers of The Open Championship. It was first played in 2024.

Kyra van Kan of South Africa won the inaugural tournament wire-to-wire, and earned places in The Women's Amateur Championship, final qualifying for the AIG Women's Open and the Investec South African Women's Open in 2024, and the Lalla Meryem Cup in 2025.

== Winners ==
| Year | Player | Score | Margin of victory | Runner-up | Venue | Location | Ref |
|---|---|---|---|---|---|---|---|
| 2026 | (South Africa) Lisa Coetzer | 216 (E) | 2 strokes | (South Africa) Lourenda Steyn | Royal Johannesburg GC | Johannesburg, South Africa | |
| 2025 | (South Africa) Gio Raad | 212 (−4) | 2 strokes | (South Africa) Bobbi Brown | Leopard Creek GC | Malalane, South Africa | |
| 2024 | (South Africa) Kyra van Kan | 215 (−1) | 9 strokes | (South Africa) Bobbi Brown | Leopard Creek GC | Malalane, South Africa | |

== See also ==
- Africa Amateur Championship
