= Lincoln Land Championship =

Golf tournament on the Korn Ferry Tour

Memorial Health Championship

Tournament information
- Location: Springfield, Illinois
- Established: 2016
- Course: Panther Creek Country Club
- Par: 71
- Length: 7,228 yards (6,609 m)
- Tour: Korn Ferry Tour
- Format: Stroke play
- Prize fund: US$1,000,000
- Month played: June/July

Tournament record score
- Aggregate: 257 Taylor Moore (2021); 257 Paul Haley II (2022)
- To par: −27 as above

Current champion
- (Canada) Drew Nesbitt

Final champion
- Location in the United States Location in Illinois

The Lincoln Land Championship is a golf tournament on the Korn Ferry Tour. It was first played in July 2016 at Panther Creek Country Club in Springfield, Illinois.

== Winners ==
Year	Winner	Score	To par	Margin of victory	Runner(s)-up
Memorial Health Championship
2026	(Canada) Drew Nesbitt	258	−26	1 stroke	(United States) Cole Sherwood
2025	(United States) Austin Smotherman	259	−25	1 stroke	(Mexico) Álvaro Ortiz
2024	(United States) Max McGreevy	260	−24	1 stroke	(United States) Steven Fisk
2023	(France) Paul Barjon	258	−26	1 stroke	(United States) Jackson Suber
2022	(United States) Paul Haley II	257	−27	3 strokes	(United States) Austin Eckroat
2021	(United States) Taylor Moore	257	−27	3 strokes	(United States) Erik Barnes
Lincoln Land Championship
2020	(Australia) Brett Drewitt	265	−19	1 stroke	(England) Harry Hall (United States) Ben Kohles (United States) Austen Truslow
2019	(China) Zhang Xinjun	269	−15	Playoff	(United States) Dylan Wu
2018	(United States) Anders Albertson	259	−25	2 strokes	(United States) Kramer Hickok (United States) Adam Long
Lincoln Land Charity Championship
2017	(United States) Adam Schenk	270	−14	Playoff	(United States) Eric Axley (United States) William Kropp (United States) Kyle Thompson
2016	(United States) Martin Flores	262	−22	2 strokes	(United States) Wesley Bryan (United States) J. T. Poston (United States) Jonathan Randolph (United States) Casey Wittenberg
