= Kyle Thompson =

American golfer

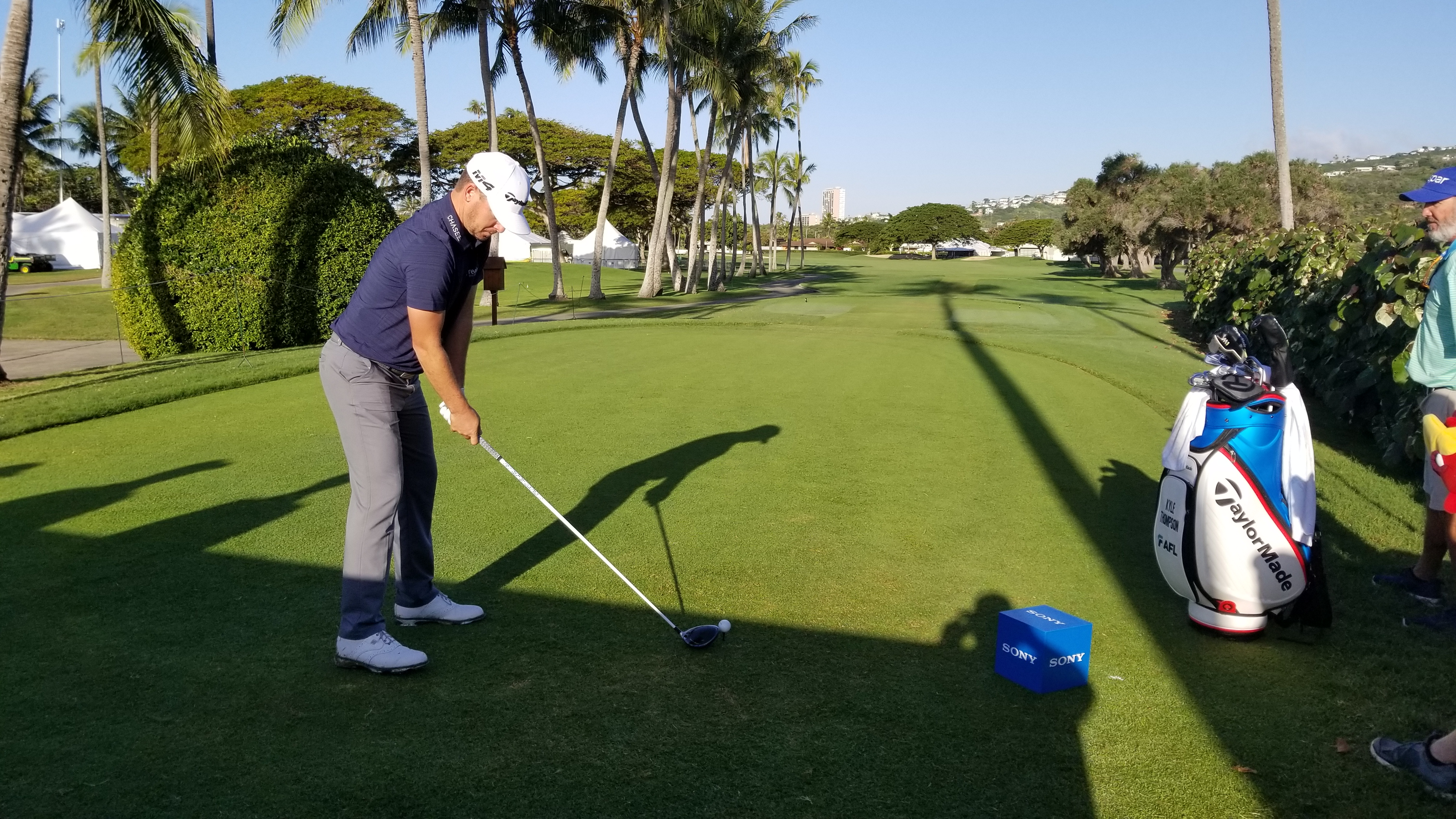
- Thompson at the 2018 Sony Open in Hawaii

Personal information
- Full name: Kyle Adam Thompson
- Nationality: United States
- Born: April 25, 1979 (age 47) Panama City, Florida, U.S.
- Height: 5 ft 10 in (1.78 m)
- Weight: 175 lb (79 kg; 12.5 st)

Career
- Sport: Golf
- College: University of South Carolina
- Turned professional: 2001
- Former tours: PGA Tour; Web.com Tour; NGA Hooters Tour
- Professional wins: 5

Number of wins by tour
- Korn Ferry Tour: 5 (Tied-7th all-time)

Best results in major championships
- Masters Tournament: DNP
- PGA Championship: DNP
- U.S. Open: CUT: 2012, 2017
- The Open Championship: DNP

Kyle Adam Thompson (born April 25, 1979) is an American former professional golfer.

== Professional career ==
Thompson is a former member of the PGA Tour. He played on the PGA Tour in 2018, 2012 and 2008, failing to keep his card each time. Thompson was a member of the Nationwide Tour from 2003 to 2007. He won two events in 2007 which put him in the top 25 on the money list which earned him a PGA Tour card for 2008. He returned to the Nationwide Tour in 2009 after making nine cuts in 26 events. Thompson again returned to the PGA Tour in 2012, but only made 3 cuts in 22 events. He earned his fourth Web.com Tour win at the 2015 Rex Hospital Open, the third time he won that event. In January 2017, Thompson won his fifth Web.com Tour event at the 2017 The Bahamas Great Exuma Classic.

After a poor 2018 season on the PGA Tour, where he made only 2 cuts in 22 starts, Thompson retired from professional golf and began working as an insurance professional.

== Amateur wins ==
- 1995 Junior PGA Championship
- 1999 NCAA East Regional
- 2001 NCAA West Regional
- 2001 Dogwood Invitational

== Professional wins (5) ==
=== Web.com Tour wins (5) ===
| No. | Date | Tournament | Winning score | Margin of victory | Runner(s)-up |
|---|---|---|---|---|---|
| 1 | Jun 10, 2007 | Rex Hospital Open | −16 (64-65-69-70=268) | 2 strokes | (United States) Bob Burns |
| 2 | Sep 16, 2007 | Oregon Classic | −17 (72-65-67-67=271) | Playoff | (Australia) Matt Jones, (United States) Jon Turcott |
| 3 | Jun 12, 2011 | Rex Hospital Open (2) | −14 (68-66-68-68=270) | 1 stroke | (United States) Scott Brown, (United States) Martin Flores, (United States) Troy Kelly |
| 4 | May 31, 2015 | Rex Hospital Open (3) | −17 (63-68-69-67=267) | Playoff | (Argentina) Miguel Ángel Carballo, (United States) Patton Kizzire |
| 5 | Jan 11, 2017 | The Bahamas Great Exuma Classic | −2 (76-70-70-70=286) | 2 strokes | (United States) Nicholas Thompson, (United States) Andrew Yun |

Web.com Tour playoff record (2–2)

| No. | Year | Tournament | Opponents | Result |
|---|---|---|---|---|
| 1 | 2004 | Scholarship America Showdown | (Australia) Mathew Goggin, (United States) Kevin Stadler, (United States) Chris Tidland | Stadler won with birdie on third extra hole Thompson eliminated by par on second hole Goggin eliminated by par on first hole |
| 2 | 2007 | Oregon Classic | (Australia) Matt Jones, (United States) Jon Turcott | Won with birdie on second extra hole |
| 3 | 2015 | Rex Hospital Open | (Argentina) Miguel Ángel Carballo, (United States) Patton Kizzire | Won with birdie on second extra hole |
| 4 | 2017 | Lincoln Land Charity Championship | (United States) Eric Axley, (United States) William Kropp, (United States) Adam Schenk | Schenk won with birdie on second extra hole |

== Results in major championships ==
| Tournament | 2012 | 2013 | 2014 | 2015 | 2016 | 2017 |
|---|---|---|---|---|---|---|
| U.S. Open | CUT | | | | | CUT |

Did not play

CUT = missed the halfway cut
Note: Thompson only played in the U.S. Open.

== See also ==
- 2007 Nationwide Tour graduates
- 2011 Nationwide Tour graduates
- 2017 Web.com Tour Finals graduates
- List of golfers with most Web.com Tour wins
