= Africa Amateur Championship =

Tournament information
- Location: Africa
- Established: 2024
- Course: Royal Johannesburg GC (2026)
- Par: 72
- Format: Stroke play
- Month played: February

Current champion
- (South Africa) Jack Buchanan

The Africa Amateur Championship is an annual amateur golf tournament run by The R&A, organizers of The Open Championship. It was first played in 2024.

== Organization ==
The championship is played in February and consists of 72 holes of stroke-play with 72 players from the Africa region, and a cut for the leading 40 players and ties after 36 holes. The inaugural winner received invitations into The Open Championship, The Amateur Championship, Alfred Dunhill Championship and Waterfall City Tournament of Champions.

== Winners ==
Year	Player	Score	Margin of victory	Runner(s)-up	Venue	Location	Ref
2026	(South Africa) Jack Buchanan	267 (−21)	6 strokes	(South Africa) Dewan de Bruin (South Africa) Charl Barnard (South Africa) Ivan Verster	Royal Johannesburg GC	Johannesburg, South Africa	
2025	(South Africa) Bryan Newman	280 (−8)	2 strokes	(Zimbabwe) Keegan Shutt	Leopard Creek GC	Malalane, South Africa	
2024	(South Africa) Altin van der Merwe	275 (−13)	Playoff (Note: Van der Merwe won with birdie on the first hole of a sudden-death playoff)	(South Africa) Christiaan Maas (South Africa) Ivan Verster	Leopard Creek GC	Malalane, South Africa	

== See also ==
- Africa Women's Amateur Invitational
