= Taylor Moore (golfer) =

American professional golfer (born 1993)

Personal information
- Nationality: United States
- Born: July 28, 1993 (age 33) San Angelo, Texas, U.S.
- Height: 5 ft 9 in (1.75 m)
- Weight: 160 lb (73 kg; 11 st)

Career
- Sport: Golf
- College: University of Arkansas
- Turned professional: 2016
- Current tour: PGA Tour
- Former tours: Korn Ferry Tour; PGA Tour Canada
- Professional wins: 3
- Highest ranking: 36 (June 1, 2055) (as of October 25, 2026)

Number of wins by tour
- PGA Tour: 1
- Korn Ferry Tour: 1
- Other: 1

Best results in major championships
- Masters Tournament: T20: 2024
- PGA Championship: T12: 2024
- U.S. Open: CUT: 2023, 2024
- The Open Championship: CUT: 2023, 2024

Taylor Moore (born July 28, 1993) is an American professional golfer. After turning professional in 2016, he progressed through the PGA Tour's development tours, graduating to the top-level PGA Tour in 2021. He has one victory on the tour, the Valspar Championship in 2023.

== Amateur career ==
In 2014, Moore won the Saguaro Amateur. He also tied as the leading medallist in the stroke play qualifying round of the U.S. Amateur.

== Professional career ==
Moore turned professional in 2016. That year, he played on the PGA Tour Canada, where he had five top-10 finishes and one victory, at the Staal Foundation Open; he finished third on the tour's order of merit to graduate to the Korn Ferry Tour for 2017. He played on the Korn Ferry Tour for four seasons, one of which was disrupted by suffering from a collapsed lung which left him unable to play for several months. He claimed his first victory on the Korn Ferry Tour in 2021, at the Memorial Health Championship, during the COVID-19 pandemic-extended 2020–21 season; he ended that season in fourth place on the regular season points list to earn his PGA Tour card for the 2021–22 season.

At the Valspar Championship in March 2023, Moore won for the first time on the PGA Tour; he overcame a two-stroke deficit in the final round to win by one over Adam Schenk.

== Personal life ==
Moore was born in San Angelo, Texas. He attended the University of Arkansas. In 2015, he was suspended from competing by the university after he was arrested and charged with felony voyeurism, alongside Nico Echavarría; he later pleaded guilty to a lesser misdemeanor charge, while Echavarría was found not to have been involved.

== Amateur wins ==
- 2010 Oklahoma Class 6A state champion
- 2011 Oklahoma Class 6A state champion
- 2014 Saguaro Amateur
- 2016 The All American

== Professional wins (3) ==
=== PGA Tour wins (1) ===
No.	Date	Tournament	Winning score	To par	Margin of victory	Runner-up
1	Mar 19, 2023	Valspar Championship	71-67-69-67=274	−10	1 stroke	(United States) Adam Schenk

=== Korn Ferry Tour wins (1) ===
No.	Date	Tournament	Winning score	To par	Margin of victory	Runner-up
1	Jul 18, 2021	Memorial Health Championship	66-66-60-65=257	−27	3 strokes	(United States) Erik Barnes

=== PGA Tour Canada wins (1) ===
No.	Date	Tournament	Winning score	To par	Margin of victory	Runner-up
1	Jul 17, 2016	Staal Foundation Open	68-70-66-66=270	−18	3 strokes	(Canada) Corey Conners

== Results in major championships ==
Tournament	2023	2024	2025
Masters Tournament	T39	T20	
PGA Championship	T72	T12	T19
U.S. Open	CUT	CUT	
The Open Championship	CUT	CUT	

Did not play

CUT = missed the half-way cut
"T" = tied

== Results in The Players Championship ==
Tournament	2023	2024	2025	2026
The Players Championship	T35	T31	T33	T50

"T" indicates a tie for a place

== See also ==
- 2021 Korn Ferry Tour Finals graduates
