= Viktor Hovland =

Norwegian professional golfer (born 1997)

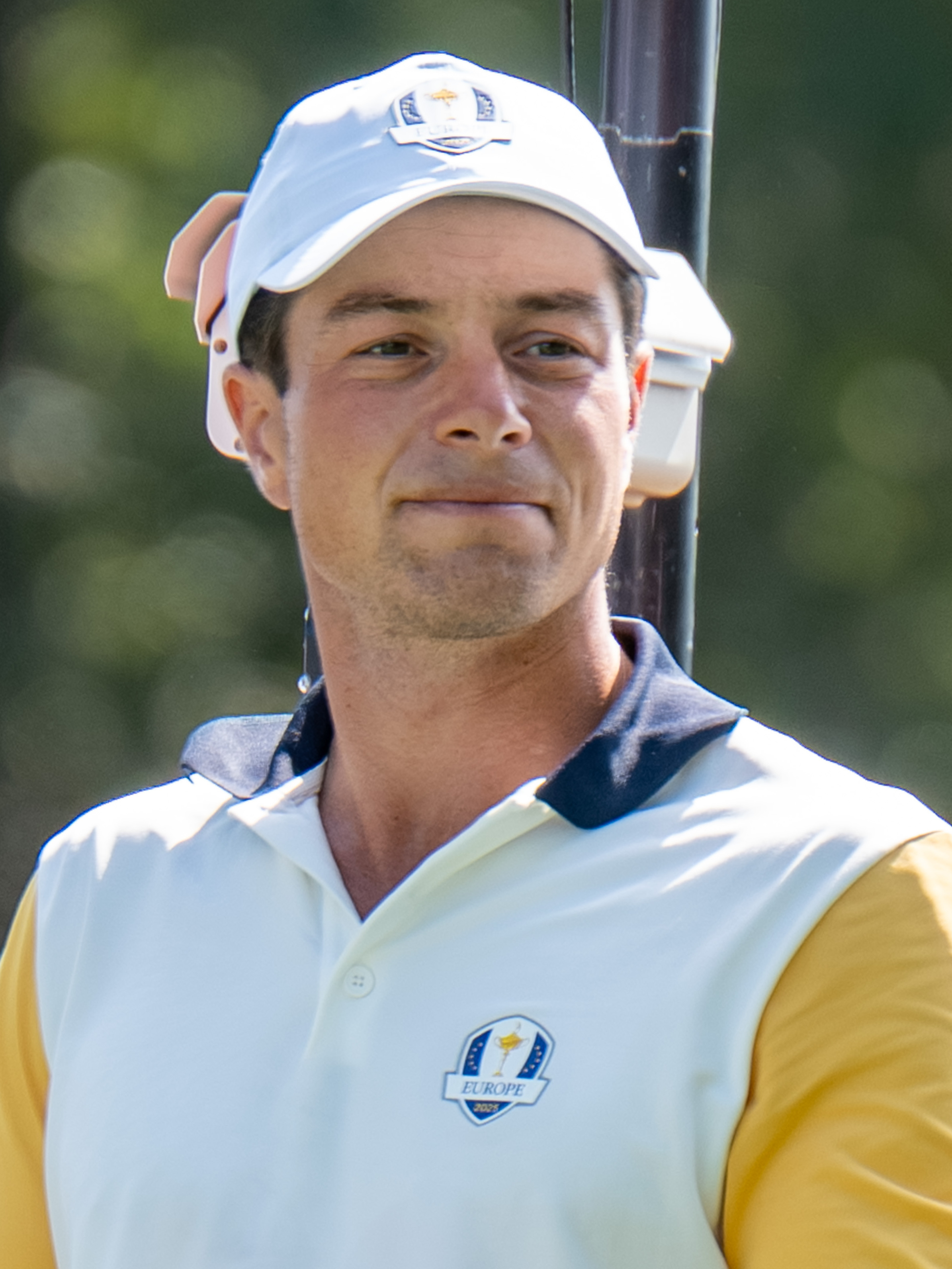
- Hovland at the 2025 Ryder Cup

Personal information
- Nickname: Hovi
- Nationality: Norway
- Born: 18 September 1997 (age 29) Oslo, Norway
- Height: 5 ft 10 in (178 cm)
- Weight: 165 lb (75 kg)

Career
- Sport: Golf
- College: Oklahoma State University
- Turned professional: 2019
- Current tours: PGA Tour; European Tour
- Professional wins: 12
- Highest ranking: 3 (30 January 2022) (as of 25 October 2026)

Number of wins by tour
- PGA Tour: 8
- European Tour: 2
- Other: 2

Best results in major championships
- Masters Tournament: T7: 2023
- PGA Championship: T2: 2023
- U.S. Open: 3rd: 2025
- The Open Championship: T4: 2022

Achievements and awards
- Ben Hogan Award: 2019
- PGA Tour FedEx Cup winner: 2023

Viktor Hovland (born 18 September 1997) is a Norwegian professional golfer who plays on the PGA Tour and European Tour. He won the 2018 U.S. Amateur and reached number one in the World Amateur Golf Ranking in 2019. Hovland became the first Norwegian to win on the PGA Tour (2020 Puerto Rico Open) and on the European Tour (2021 BMW International Open). He has won eight times on the PGA Tour, including at the 2023 Tour Championship, resulting in his first FedEx Cup.

Hovland competed at the 2020 Summer Olympics and the 2024 Summer Olympics.

== Amateur career ==
Hovland started playing golf at the age of eleven, after his father Harald had taken up golf while working as an engineer in St. Louis. Five years later, in 2014, Hovland won the Norwegian Amateur Golf Championship as a 16-year-old. From 2016 to 2019, he played college golf at Oklahoma State University with, among others, Kristoffer Ventura.

Hovland won the 2018 U.S. Amateur, the first Norwegian player to do so, and earned invitations into the 2019 Masters Tournament, the 2019 U.S. Open, and the 2019 Open Championship. He played in the 2018 Emirates Australian Open as an amateur, finishing tied for 13th place.

Hovland was the low amateur in the 2019 Masters Tournament, finishing three under par in a tie for 32nd. With this performance he rose to number one in the World Amateur Golf Ranking. In the 2019 U.S. Open, he finished in 12th place and was low amateur with a score of 280. This was the lowest 72-hole score by an amateur in the U.S. Open, breaking the previous record of 282, set by Jack Nicklaus in 1960. He became the first player to win low amateur honors at both the Masters and U.S. Open in the same season since Matt Kuchar in 1998. In 2019, he was the recipient of the Ben Hogan Award, awarded to the best college player in the United States.

== Professional career ==
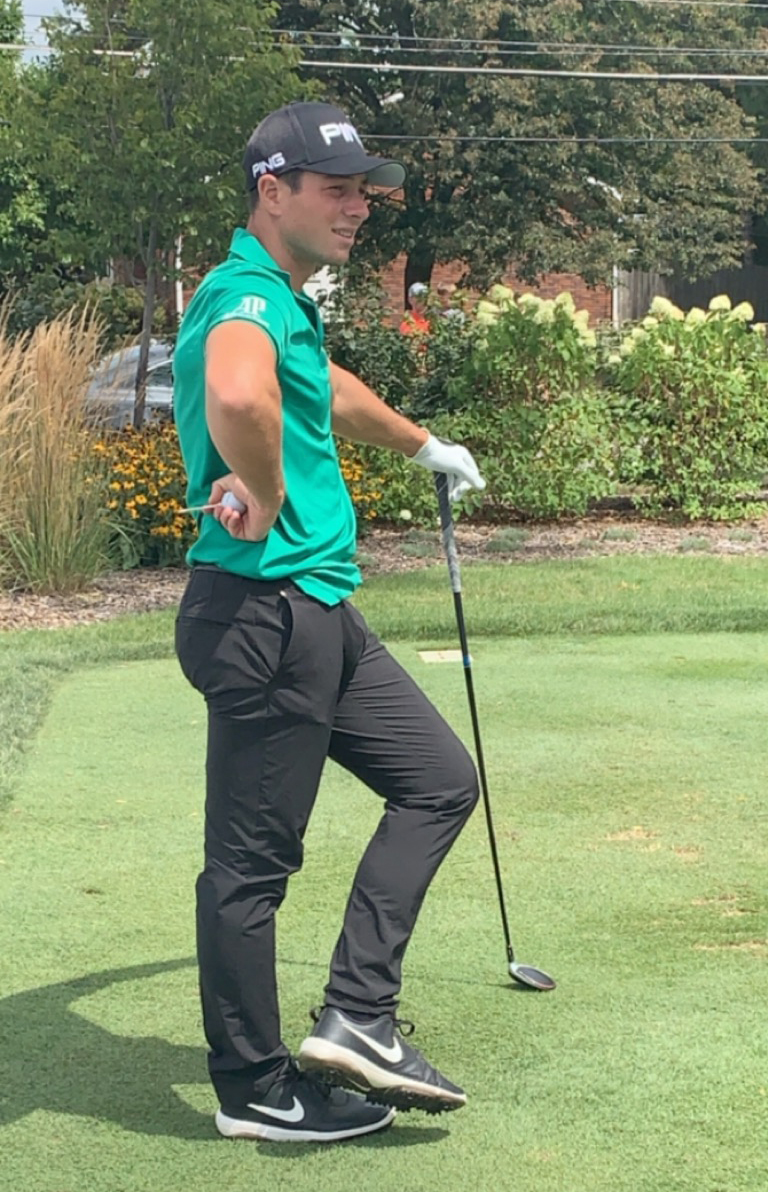
Hovland at the 2019 Nationwide Children's Hospital Championship

=== 2019 ===
Hovland turned professional following the 2019 U.S. Open, and made his professional debut at the Travelers Championship in June. By doing so, he forfeited his automatic entry to the 2019 Open Championship.

In August, Hovland finished tied for second in the Albertsons Boise Open, part of the Korn Ferry Tour Finals. This finish secured him a PGA Tour card for the 2019–20 season. Hovland set a PGA Tour record for most consecutive rounds in the 60s with 19 lasting into the second round of the CJ Cup in South Korea.

=== 2020: First win ===
In February, Hovland became the first Norwegian to win on the PGA Tour when he won the Puerto Rico Open. In December, he picked up his second PGA Tour win, and his first at a full-strength PGA Tour tournament, by birdieing the 72nd hole at the Mayakoba Golf Classic.

=== 2021 ===
In June, Hovland became the first Norwegian to win on the European Tour when he won the BMW International Open.

In September, Hovland played on the European team in the 2021 Ryder Cup at Whistling Straits in Kohler, Wisconsin. Hovland was the first Norwegian Ryder Cup member. The U.S. team won 19–9 and Hovland went 0–3–2 and tied his Sunday singles match against Collin Morikawa.

In November, Hovland successfully defended his title at the World Wide Technology Championship at Mayakoba in Playa del Carmen, Mexico. He won by four strokes and set a tournament record of 23 under par. A month later, he won the Hero World Challenge, finishing at 18 under par, one shot ahead of Scottie Scheffler. Key moments in this win were back-to-back eagles in the final round on holes 14 and 15. This win cemented his new nickname as the "Resort King" of golf, as his first 5 professional wins were outside of the Contiguous United States, 4 of which around the Caribbean Sea.

=== 2022 ===
Hovland started the year with a top-5 finish at the European Tour's Abu Dhabi HSBC Championship in January. The following week he won the Slync.io Dubai Desert Classic; after shooting a final-round 66, he made a birdie on the first hole of a sudden-death playoff to defeat Richard Bland. The win lifted him to number three in the Official World Golf Ranking.

In December 2022, Hovland successfully defended his title at the Hero World Challenge at Albany in the Bahamas, matching Tiger Woods as the only player with back-to-back wins in the event.

=== 2023 ===
Hovland contended at The Masters and the PGA Championship, but was unable to find his first major victory. He shot a closing round 74 at Augusta to finish tied for 7th. He closed the PGA Championship at Oak Hill with a 68, ultimately falling two strokes shy of Brooks Koepka.

In June, Hovland won the Memorial Tournament, defeating Denny McCarthy in a playoff. Hovland made birdie on the 17th hole to force the playoff, and was the only player to birdie 17 on the day.

In August, Hovland shot a final round course-record 61 to win the BMW Championship at Olympia Fields Country Club near Chicago, Illinois. His scorecard for the final round featured twelve threes. This was the second event in the 2023 FedEx Cup Playoffs. The following week, he won the Tour Championship, as well as the FedEx Cup. He became the third-youngest FedEx Cup champion.

In September 2023, Hovland played on the European team in the 2023 Ryder Cup at Marco Simone Golf and Country Club in Guidonia, Rome, Italy. The European team won 16.5–11.5 and Hovland went 3–1–1 including a win in his Sunday singles match against Collin Morikawa. In the Saturday foursomes session, he and Ludvig Åberg recorded a 9 and 7 victory over world number one Scottie Scheffler and reigning PGA Champion Brooks Koepka, setting a new record for the largest winning margin in an 18-hole Ryder Cup match.

=== 2025 ===
In March 2025, Hovland won the Valspar Championship for his first win since the 2023 Tour Championship. Hovland, who trailed Justin Thomas by three shots after 13 holes, birdied the 14th, 16th, and 17th holes to win by one.

=== 2026 ===
In June 2026, Hovland won the Travelers Championship for his first win of the year. He shot a total of −21 to tie with Scottie Scheffler and force a Monday playoff. Hovland birdied the first playoff hole to take the title.

== Amateur wins ==
- 2013 Norgescup 7, Team Norway Junior Tour 6
- 2014 Alcaidesa Winter Open, Titleist Tour 2, Norwegian Amateur Golf Championship (Norgesmesterskapet)
- 2018 Valspar Collegiate, U.S. Amateur, Royal Oaks Intercollegiate
- 2019 The Prestige

== Professional wins (12) ==
=== PGA Tour wins (8) ===
Legend
FedEx Cup playoff events (2)
Designated events (2)
Other PGA Tour (4)

No.	Date	Tournament	Winning score	Margin of victory	Runner(s)-up
1	23 Feb 2020	Puerto Rico Open	−20 (68-66-64-70=268)	1 stroke	(United States) Josh Teater
2	6 Dec 2020	Mayakoba Golf Classic	−20 (67-69-63-65=264)	1 stroke	(United States) Aaron Wise
3	7 Nov 2021	World Wide Technology Championship (2)	−23 (67-65-62-67=261)	4 strokes	(Mexico) Carlos Ortiz
4	4 Jun 2023	Memorial Tournament	−7 (71-71-69-70=281)	Playoff	(United States) Denny McCarthy
5	20 Aug 2023	BMW Championship	−17 (69-68-65-61=263)	2 strokes	(England) Matt Fitzpatrick, (United States) Scottie Scheffler
6	27 Aug 2023	Tour Championship	−27^{1} (68-64-66-63=261)	5 strokes	(United States) Xander Schauffele
7	23 Mar 2025	Valspar Championship	−11 (70-67-69-67=273)	1 stroke	(United States) Justin Thomas
8	29 Jun 2026	Travelers Championship	−21 (65-61-64-69=259)	Playoff	(United States) Scottie Scheffler

^{1}Started tournament at −8 FedEx Cup playoffs adjustment, scored −19 to par.

PGA Tour playoff record (2–0)

No.	Year	Tournament	Opponent	Result
1	2023	Memorial Tournament	(United States) Denny McCarthy	Won with par on first extra hole
2	2026	Travelers Championship	(United States) Scottie Scheffler	Won with birdie on first extra hole

=== European Tour wins (2) ===
Legend
Rolex Series (1)
Other European Tour (1)

No.	Date	Tournament	Winning score	Margin of victory	Runner-up
1	27 Jun 2021	BMW International Open	−19 (68-67-64-70=269)	2 strokes	(Germany) Martin Kaymer
2	30 Jan 2022	Slync.io Dubai Desert Classic	−12 (68-69-73-66=276)	Playoff	(England) Richard Bland

European Tour playoff record (1–0)

No.	Year	Tournament	Opponent	Result
1	2022	Slync.io Dubai Desert Classic	(England) Richard Bland	Won with birdie on first extra hole

=== Other wins (2) ===
No.	Date	Tournament	Winning score	Margin of victory	Runner-up
1	5 Dec 2021	Hero World Challenge	−18 (68-69-67-66=270)	1 stroke	(United States) Scottie Scheffler
2	4 Dec 2022	Hero World Challenge (2)	−16 (69-70-64-69=272)	2 strokes	(United States) Scottie Scheffler

== Results in major championships ==
Results not in chronological order in 2020.

Tournament	2019	2020	2021	2022	2023	2024	2025	2026
Masters Tournament	T32LA		T21	T27	T7	CUT	T21	T18
PGA Championship		T33	T30	T41	T2	3	T28	CUT
U.S. Open	T12LA	T13	WD	CUT	19	CUT	3	CUT
The Open Championship		NT	T12	T4	T13	CUT	T63	CUT

Top 10
Did not play

LA = low amateur
CUT = missed the half-way cut
"T" = tied for place
WD = withdrew
NT = no tournament due to COVID-19 pandemic

=== Summary ===
Tournament	Wins	2nd	3rd	Top-5	Top-10	Top-25	Events	Cuts made
Masters Tournament	0	0	0	0	1	4	7	6
PGA Championship	0	1	1	2	2	2	7	6
U.S. Open	0	0	1	1	1	4	8	4
The Open Championship	0	0	0	1	1	3	6	4
Totals	0	1	2	4	5	13	28	20

- Most consecutive cuts made – 6 (2019 Masters – 2021 PGA)
- Longest streak of top-10s – 3 (2022 Open Championship – 2023 PGA Championship)

== Results in The Players Championship ==
Tournament	2021	2022	2023	2024	2025	2026
The Players Championship	CUT	T9	T3	T62	CUT	T13

Top 10

CUT = missed the halfway cut
"T" indicates a tie for a place

== Results in World Golf Championships ==
Tournament	2020	2021	2022	2023
Championship		T2		
Match Play	NT^{1}	T42	T18	T31
Invitational	T59	T36		
Champions	NT^{1}	NT^{1}	NT^{1}	

^{1}Cancelled due to COVID-19 pandemic

Top 10
Did not play

NT = No tournament
"T" = Tied
Note that the Championship and Invitational were discontinued from 2022. The Champions was discontinued from 2023.

== Team appearances ==
Amateur

- European Boys' Team Championship (representing Norway): 2013, 2014, 2015
- Summer Youth Olympics (representing Norway): 2014
- Jacques Léglise Trophy (representing Continental Europe): 2015 (tie)
- European Amateur Team Championship (representing Norway): 2016, 2017
- Eisenhower Trophy (representing Norway): 2016, 2018
- Arnold Palmer Cup (representing Europe): 2017, 2018

Professional

- Ryder Cup (representing Europe): 2021, 2023 (winners), 2025 (winners)

Ryder Cup points record
2021	2023	2025	Total
1	3.5	1.5	6

== See also ==
- 2019 Korn Ferry Tour Finals graduates
