= Altin van der Merwe =

South African professional golfer (born 1996)

Personal information
- Nationality: South Africa
- Born: 8 November 1996 (age 29) Bellville, South Africa

Career
- Sport: Golf
- Turned professional: 2024
- Current tour: Sunshine Tour
- Professional wins: 1

Number of wins by tour
- Sunshine Tour: 1

Best results in major championships
- Masters Tournament: DNP
- PGA Championship: DNP
- U.S. Open: DNP
- The Open Championship: CUT: 2024

Achievements and awards
- Sunshine Tour Rookie of the Year: 2024–25

Altin van der Merwe (born 8 November 1996) is a South African professional golfer who plays on the Sunshine Tour. He won The R&A's Africa Amateur Championship in 2024.

== Early life and amateur career ==
Van der Merwe was successful on the South Africa amateur circuit, and shoot up to No 1 in the GolfRSA Open Amateur rankings in 2023. He represented South Africa in the 2023 World Amateur Team Championships for the Eisenhower Trophy in Abu Dhabi alongside Christo Lamprecht and Christiaan Maas, finishing 7th.

He finished runner-up at the 2023 Scottish Amateur Stroke Play Championship, and won the 2024 GolfRSA International Amateur in sudden death playoff with Dutchman Jack Ingham,

Van der Merwe was low amateur at the 113th Investec South African Open Championship and was presented with the Freddie Tait Cup, after he was the sole amateur to make the cut.

He won thee 2024 Africa Amateur Championship, after he birdied the first hole in a three-way sudden-death playoff. The win earned him a start in the 2024 Open Championship at Royal Troon Golf Club.

== Professional career ==
Van der Merwe turned professional after the 2024 Open Championship, and joined the Sunshine Tour.

He was named 2024–25 Sunshine Tour Rookie of the Year following a handful of top-5 finishes, including a runner-up finish at the 2025 SDC Open, where he lost a playoff to Daniel van Tonder.

The following season he was runner-up at the Limpopo Championship.

== Amateur wins ==
- 2015 Curro South African Juniors International
- 2019 Eastern Province Stroke Play
- 2023 Boland Amateur Stroke Play Championship, Western Province Amateur, KwaZulu-Natal Amateur Championship, Mpumalanga Open
- 2024 GolfRSA International Amateur, Africa Amateur Championship

== Professional wins (1) ==
=== Sunshine Tour wins (1) ===
No.	Date	Tournament	Winning score	Margin of victory	Runner-up
1	10 May 2026	FBC Zim Open	−21 (67-68-64-68=267)	4 strokes	(Australia) Austin Bautista

Sunshine Tour playoff record (0–1)

No.	Year	Tournament	Opponent	Result
1	2025	SDC Open	(South Africa) Daniel van Tonder	Lost to par on first extra hole

== Team appearances ==
Amateur

- Eisenhower Trophy (representing South Africa): 2023
