= Kurt Kitayama =

American professional golfer (born 1993)

Personal information
- Full name: Kurt Shun Kitayama
- Nicknames: Quadzilla, The Project, The Kitty Kat
- Nationality: United States
- Born: January 14, 1993 (age 33) Chico, California, U.S.
- Height: 5 ft 7 in (1.70 m)
- Weight: 170 lb (77 kg)

Career
- Sport: Golf
- College: University of Nevada-Las Vegas
- Turned professional: 2015
- Current tours: PGA Tour; European Tour
- Former tours: Asian Tour; Web.com Tour; PGA Tour Canada; PGA Tour China; Asian Development Tour
- Professional wins: 5
- Highest ranking: 19 (March 5, 2023) (as of October 25, 2026)

Number of wins by tour
- PGA Tour: 2
- European Tour: 2
- Asian Tour: 1
- Sunshine Tour: 1

Best results in major championships
- Masters Tournament: T35: 2024
- PGA Championship: T4: 2023
- U.S. Open: T53: 2026
- The Open Championship: T40: 2026

Kurt Shun Kitayama (born January 14, 1993) is an American professional golfer who plays on the PGA Tour. On the European Tour, he won the AfrAsia Bank Mauritius Open in December 2018 and the Oman Open in March 2019. In March 2023, he won the Arnold Palmer Invitational on the PGA Tour. In July 2025, he won the 3M Open tournament for his second PGA Tour victory.

== Early life ==
Kitayama was born in Chico, California, some 87 miles north of Sacramento, and graduated from Chico High School in 2011. Although his height was just 5–6, he was the Senior co-captain and starting point guard on the basketball team, while leading the Panthers to a 27–2 record and the 2011 California Northern Section Title. In the Championship Game, he scored 31 points and had 6 assists as Chico beat city-rival Pleasant Valley High School by a score of 67–54.

Kitayama's older brother Daniel played golf 2007–2008 at the University of Hawaii at Hilo and later came to work as a professional caddie.

== Amateur career ==
In 2009, Kitayama finished tied 3rd at the Callaway Junior World Golf Championships, 15–17 age category, at the 2008 U.S. Open course Torrey Pines, South Course, San Diego, California, against an international field including Bryson DeChambeau. Kitayama was appointed 2009 Player of the Year by The Junior Golf Association of Northern California.

After high school, Kitayama attended the University of Nevada-Las Vegas from 2011 to 2015, where he was named to the Academic-All Mountain West team three consecutive years. He won the Jackrabbit Invitational held in Primm, Nevada, in 2014 as well as 2015.

Kitayama's best World Amateur Golf Ranking was 47th.

== Professional career ==
Kitayama turned professional in 2015. He played mostly on the Web.com Tour in 2016 and 2017 with little success and was ranked 1174 in the world at the end of 2017.

In 2018, Kitayama played mostly on the Asian Tour. He played a single Asian Development Tour event, the PGM Darulaman Championship in Malaysia, which he won. He had some good finishes on the Asian Tour, including tied for 4th in the New Zealand Open, joint runner-up in the Royal Cup and joint 4th in the Asia-Pacific Diamond Cup Golf, an event co-sanctioned with the Japan Golf Tour.

In November 2018, he finished tied for 3rd place in the European Tour Q-School to earn a place on the 2019 European Tour. In just the second event of the season, the AfrAsia Bank Mauritius Open, played in late 2018, he won by two strokes. The event was co-sanctioned with the Sunshine Tour and the Asian Tour. The win lifted him into the top 200 of the world rankings. In March 2019, he became the fastest player to two wins in European Tour history when he won the Oman Open in only his 11th career appearance.

In September 2021, he earned his PGA Tour card by finishing 23rd in the Korn Ferry Tour Finals.

In February 2022, he recorded a 3rd place finish at The Honda Classic. In May 2022, Kitayama improved upon this performance, recording a T2 finish at the Mexico Open.

In March 2023, he earned his first PGA Tour victory by winning the Arnold Palmer Invitational.

In July 2025, he earned his second PGA Tour victory at the 3M Open. In the third round, he shot a career-best and tournament-record-tying 60 that put him within one of the leaders. The win moved him into the top 70 in the FedEx Cup standings and secured a spot in the FedEx Cup Playoffs.

== Amateur wins ==
- 2014 Jackrabbit Invitational
- 2015 Jackrabbit Invitational

== Professional wins (5) ==
=== PGA Tour wins (2) ===
Legend
Designated events (1)
Other PGA Tour (1)

No.	Date	Tournament	Winning score	Margin of victory	Runner(s)-up
1	Mar 5, 2023	Arnold Palmer Invitational	−9 (67-68-72-72=279)	1 stroke	(United States) Harris English, (Northern Ireland) Rory McIlroy
2	Jul 27, 2025	3M Open	−23 (65-71-60-65=261)	1 stroke	(United States) Sam Stevens

=== European Tour wins (2) ===
No.	Date	Tournament	Winning score	Margin of victory	Runners-up
1	Dec 2, 2018 (2019 season)	AfrAsia Bank Mauritius Open^{1}	−20 (65-65-70-68=268)	2 strokes	(India) S. Chikkarangappa, (France) Matthieu Pavon
2	Mar 2, 2019	Oman Open	−7 (66-74-71-70=281)	1 stroke	(Spain) Jorge Campillo, (Germany) Maximilian Kieffer, (France) Clément Sordet, (Paraguay) Fabrizio Zanotti

^{1}Co-sanctioned by the Asian Tour and the Sunshine Tour

European Tour playoff record (0–1)

No.	Year	Tournament	Opponents	Result
1	2019	Turkish Airlines Open	(England) Tyrrell Hatton, (France) Benjamin Hébert, (France) Victor Perez, (Austria) Matthias Schwab, (South Africa) Erik van Rooyen	Hatton won with par on fourth extra hole Kitayama eliminated by birdie on third hole Hébert, Perez and van Rooyen eliminated by birdie on first hole

=== Asian Tour wins (1) ===
No.	Date	Tournament	Winning score	Margin of victory	Runners-up
1	Dec 2, 2018	AfrAsia Bank Mauritius Open^{1}	−20 (65-65-70-68=268)	2 strokes	(India) S. Chikkarangappa, (France) Matthieu Pavon

^{1}Co-sanctioned by the European Tour and the Sunshine Tour

=== Asian Development Tour wins (1) ===
No.	Date	Tournament	Winning score	Margin of victory	Runner-up
1	Jan 27, 2018	Darulaman Championship^{1}	−21 (63-70-64-70=267)	2 strokes	(United States) John Catlin

^{1}Co-sanctioned by the Professional Golf of Malaysia Tour

== Results in major championships ==
Results not in chronological order in 2020.

Tournament	2019	2020	2021	2022	2023	2024	2025	2026
Masters Tournament					CUT	T35		51
PGA Championship	T64	T51	CUT		T4	T26	CUT	T10
U.S. Open		CUT		CUT	CUT	CUT		T53
The Open Championship	CUT	NT	CUT	T72	T60	T41		T40

Top 10
Did not play

CUT = missed the half-way cut
"T" = tied
NT = no tournament due to COVID-19 pandemic

=== Summary ===
Tournament	Wins	2nd	3rd	Top-5	Top-10	Top-25	Events	Cuts made
Masters Tournament	0	0	0	0	0	0	3	2
PGA Championship	0	0	0	1	2	2	7	5
U.S. Open	0	0	0	0	0	0	5	1
The Open Championship	0	0	0	0	0	0	6	4
Totals	0	0	0	1	2	2	21	12

- Most consecutive cuts made – 4 (2026 Masters – 2026 Open Championship, current)
- Longest streak of top-10s – 1 (twice)

== Results in The Players Championship ==
Tournament	2023	2024	2025	2026
The Players Championship	CUT	T19	T33	CUT

CUT = missed the halfway cut
"T" indicates a tie for a place

== Results in World Golf Championships ==
Tournament	2019	2020	2021	2022	2023
Championship		T53			
Match Play		NT^{1}			QF
Invitational					
Champions	T28	NT^{1}	NT^{1}	NT^{1}	

^{1}Canceled due to COVID-19 pandemic

Top 10
Did not play

NT = No tournament
QF, R16, R32, R64 = Round in which player lost in match play
"T" = Tied
Note that the Championship and Invitational were discontinued from 2022. The Champions was discontinued from 2023.

== See also ==
- 2018 European Tour Qualifying School graduates
- 2021 Korn Ferry Tour Finals graduates
