= Adam Schenk =

American professional golfer (born 1992)

Personal information
- Full name: Adam Cole Schenk
- Nationality: United States
- Born: January 26, 1992 (age 34) Vincennes, Indiana, U.S.
- Height: 6 ft 2 in (188 cm)
- Weight: 190 lb (86 kg)
- Spouse: Kourtney Schenk

Career
- Sport: Golf
- College: Purdue University
- Turned professional: 2015
- Current tour: PGA Tour
- Former tours: Web.com Tour; PGA Tour Latinoamérica
- Professional wins: 4
- Highest ranking: 40 (September 10, 2023) (as of October 25, 2026)

Number of wins by tour
- PGA Tour: 1
- Korn Ferry Tour: 1
- Other: 2

Best results in major championships
- Masters Tournament: T12: 2024
- PGA Championship: T41: 2022
- U.S. Open: T24: 2022
- The Open Championship: CUT: 2023, 2024

Adam Cole Schenk (born January 26, 1992) is an American professional golfer.

== Early life and career ==
Schenk was born in Vincennes, Indiana. He played college golf at Purdue University where he won twice as a freshman.

Schenk turned professional in 2015 and played on the PGA Tour Latinoamérica that year. He had six top-10 finishes with a best finish of fourth at the Abierto Mexicano de Golf and the Honduras Open. In 2016, he played on the Web.com Tour with a best finish of second at the United Leasing & Finance Championship. He played on the Web.com Tour again in 2017, winning the Lincoln Land Charity Championship in June in a four-man playoff. He earned his PGA Tour card for 2018 by finishing 12th on the regular season money list.

On the PGA Tour in 2018, Schenk earned one top-10 finish, at the Zurich Classic of New Orleans, a team event he played with Tyler Duncan. He finished 157th on the FedEx Cup standings and had to play in the Web.com Tour Finals to try to regain his card for 2019. In the Finals, he posted three top-10 finishes in four events, including second place at the Albertsons Boise Open to finish seventh in the Finals rankings and earn his 2019 PGA Tour card. On the PGA Tour in 2019, he posted three top-10 finishes and finished 71st on the FedEx Cup standings to retain his card for 2020.

Schenk held his first ever career 54-hole lead on the PGA Tour in October 2021 at the Shriners Children's Open by a single stroke. He could only manage a one-under final round though resulting in a T3 finish, which was his best ever finish on tour to date. Schenk had a second 54-hole lead at the 2023 Valspar Championship leading Spieth and Fleetwood by one stroke at Innisbrook's Copperhead Course in Palm Harbour, Florida. He would go on to make the Tour Championship that year and finished T-9th.

On the verge of losing full-time playing status for 2026, Schenk earned his first PGA Tour win at the 2025 Butterfield Bermuda Championship, his 243rd PGA Tour start, earning a two-year exemption through the 2027 season.

== Amateur wins ==
- 2010 Purdue/Midwest Shootout
- 2011 Boilermaker Invitational
- 2013 Indiana Amateur

== Professional wins (4) ==
=== PGA Tour wins (1) ===
| No. | Date | Tournament | Winning score | Margin of victory | Runner-up |
|---|---|---|---|---|---|
| 1 | Nov 16, 2025 | Butterfield Bermuda Championship | −12 (69-65-67-71=272) | 1 stroke | (United States) Chandler Phillips |

PGA Tour playoff record (0–1)

| No. | Year | Tournament | Opponent | Result |
|---|---|---|---|---|
| 1 | 2023 | Charles Schwab Challenge | (Argentina) Emiliano Grillo | Lost to birdie on second extra hole |

=== Web.com Tour wins (1) ===
| No. | Date | Tournament | Winning score | Margin of victory | Runners-up |
|---|---|---|---|---|---|
| 1 | Jun 25, 2017 | Lincoln Land Charity Championship | −14 (67-66-65-72=270) | Playoff | (United States) Eric Axley, (United States) William Kropp, (United States) Kyle Thompson |

Web.com Tour playoff record (1–0)

| No. | Year | Tournament | Opponents | Result |
|---|---|---|---|---|
| 1 | 2017 | Lincoln Land Charity Championship | (United States) Eric Axley, (United States) William Kropp, (United States) Kyle Thompson | Won with birdie on second extra hole |

=== Other wins (2) ===
- 2015 Iowa Open, Metropolitan Open

== Results in major championships ==
| Tournament | 2022 | 2023 | 2024 | 2025 | 2026 |
|---|---|---|---|---|---|
| Masters Tournament | | | T12 | CUT | |
| PGA Championship | T41 | CUT | CUT | | CUT |
| U.S. Open | T24 | CUT | CUT | T50 | |
| The Open Championship | | CUT | CUT | | |

Did not play

CUT = missed the half-way cut
"T" = tied

== Results in The Players Championship ==
| Tournament | 2021 | 2022 | 2023 | 2024 | 2025 | 2026 |
|---|---|---|---|---|---|---|
| The Players Championship | CUT | CUT | CUT | T19 | CUT | CUT |

CUT = missed the halfway cut
"T" indicates a tie for a place

== See also ==
- 2017 Web.com Tour Finals graduates
- 2018 Web.com Tour Finals graduates
