= 2017 PGA Tour Latinoamérica =

Golf tour season

2017 PGA Tour Latinoamérica season
- Duration: February 16, 2017 – December 3, 2017
- Number of official events: 18
- Most wins: (Mexico) José de Jesús Rodríguez (2) (United States) Brady Schnell (2)
- Order of Merit: (Mexico) José de Jesús Rodríguez

The 2017 PGA Tour Latinoamérica was the sixth season of PGA Tour Latinoamérica, the main professional golf tour in Latin America, operated and run by the PGA Tour.

== Schedule ==
The following table lists official events during the 2017 season.

Date	Tournament	Host country	Purse (US$)	Winner (Note: The number in parentheses after each winner's name is the number of PGA Tour Latinoamérica events they had won up to and including that tournament. It is rare for someone to accumulate many wins on the PGA Tour Latinoamérica as success at this level usually leads to promotion to the Web.com Tour.)	OWGR points
Feb 19	Avianca Colombia Open	Colombia	175,000	(Mexico) José de Jesús Rodríguez (3)	6
Mar 12	Molino Cañuelas Championship	Argentina	175,000	(United States) Brandon Matthews (1)	6
Mar 19	Guatemala Stella Artois Open	Guatemala	175,000	(Chile) Cristián Espinoza (n/a) (Note: Shortened to 18 holes due to weather. Due to the event's length, this win is not officially recognized as a PGA Tour Latinoamérica victory.)	n/a
Mar 26	Honduras Open	Honduras	175,000	(United States) Patrick Newcomb (1)	6
Apr 23	Abierto OSDE del Centro	Argentina	175,000	(Argentina) Nelson Ledesma (1)	6
May 7	Essential Costa Rica Classic	Costa Rica	175,000	(Guatemala) José Toledo (1)	6
Jun 4	Quito Open	Ecuador	175,000	(United States) Curtis Yonke (1)	6
Jun 11	Puerto Plata Dominican Republic Open	Dominican Republic	175,000	(United States) Tee-K Kelly (1)	6
Jun 18	BMW Jamaica Classic	Jamaica	175,000	(United States) Jared Wolfe (1)	6
Aug 20	Abierto del Paraguay-Copa NEC	Paraguay	175,000	(Mexico) José de Jesús Rodríguez (4)	7
Sep 3	Flor de Caña Open	Nicaragua	175,000	(United States) Michael Buttacavoli (2)	6
Sep 10	San Luis Championship	Mexico	175,000	(Mexico) Óscar Fraustro (2)	6
Oct 15	Aberto do Brasil	Brazil	175,000	(Mexico) Rodolfo Cazaubón (4)	6
Oct 22	Lexus Peru Open	Peru	175,000	(United States) Charlie Saxon (1)	4
Oct 29	Roberto De Vicenzo Punta del Este Open Copa NEC	Uruguay	175,000	(United States) Brian Richey (1)	6
Nov 12	NEC Argentina Classic	Argentina	175,000	(Argentina) Julián Etulain (4)	6
Nov 19	Visa Open de Argentina	Argentina	175,000	(United States) Brady Schnell (1)	7
Dec 3	Shell Championship	United States	175,000	(United States) Brady Schnell (2)	6

=== Unofficial events ===
The following events were sanctioned by the PGA Tour Latinoamérica, but did not carry official money, nor were wins official.

Date	Tournament	Host country	Purse ($)	Winner	OWGR points
Dec 16	Aruba Cup	Aruba	120,000	PGA Tour Canada	n/a

== Order of Merit ==
The Order of Merit was based on prize money won during the season, calculated in U.S. dollars. The top five players on the Order of Merit earned status to play on the 2018 Web.com Tour.

Position	Player	Prize money ($)
1	(Mexico) José de Jesús Rodríguez	119,001
2	(United States) Jared Wolfe	93,035
3	(United States) Brian Richey	77,486
4	(Guatemala) José Toledo	74,171
5	(Argentina) Nelson Ledesma	70,604

== Developmental Series ==
2017 PGA Tour Latinoamérica Developmental Series season
- Duration: 15 December 2016 – 10 December 2017
- Number of official events: 16
- Dev Series Final: (Chile) Horacio León

The 2017 PGA Tour Latinoamérica Developmental Series was the fifth season of the PGA Tour Latinoamérica Developmental Series, the official development tour to the PGA Tour Latinoamérica between 2013 and 2023.

=== Schedule ===
The following table lists official events during the 2017 season.

Date	Tournament	Host country	Purse	Winner (Note: The number in parentheses after each winner's name is the number of PGA Tour Latinoamérica Developmental Series events they had won up to and including that tournament. As most Developmental Series events are incorporated from regional tour schedules, details of these wins are displayed there instead.)	Main tour (Note: COL − Colombian Tour; GGPM − Gira de Golf Profesional Mexicana; TPG − TPG Tour.)
Dec 18	Abierto del Caribe	Colombia	Col$125,000,000	(Colombia) Daniel Zuluaga	COL
Feb 11	Abierto del Sur	Argentina	Arg$550,000	(Argentina) Marcos Montenegro	TPG
Apr 2	Abierto Norpatagónico	Argentina	Arg$550,000	(Argentina) Maximiliano Godoy	TPG
May 13	Abierto del Norte	Argentina	Arg$550,000	(Argentina) César Costilla	TPG
May 21	Abierto CC El Carmel	Colombia	Col$100,000,000	(Colombia) Ómar Beltrán	COL
May 29	Bosque Real Championship	Mexico	Mex$1,600,000	(Mexico) Carlos Ortiz	GGPM
Jul 16	Abierto Club Militar	Colombia	Col$100,000,000	(Colombia) Diego Velásquez	COL
Aug 13	Abierto Club Campestre de Medellín	Colombia	Col$100,000,000	(Colombia) Marcelo Rozo	COL
Aug 27	Mayakoba Open	Mexico	Mex$1,600,000	(Mexico) José de Jesús Rodríguez	GGPM
Sep 17	Bolivia Open Mitsuba	Bolivia	US$50,000	(Uruguay) Juan Álvarez (1)	
Oct 7	Carlos Franco Invitational	Paraguay	US$40,000	(Argentina) Franco Romero	TPG
Oct 22	La Vista Championship	Mexico	Mex$2,000,000	(Mexico) Armando Villarreal	GGPM
Nov 26	Abierto Sambil	Venezuela	US$30,000	(Venezuela) Felipe Velázquez (1)	
Nov 26	Andrés Romero Invitational	Argentina	Arg$600,000	(Argentina) Augusto Núñez	TPG
Dec 3	Abierto del Litoral	Argentina	Arg$550,000	(Argentina) Sebastián Bergagna	TPG
Dec 10	Malinalco Classic Dev Series Final	Mexico	US$40,000	(Chile) Horacio León (2)	

=== Dev Series Final ===
The Dev Series Final was made up of the top-five finishers of each tournament during the season. The top five finishers in the Dev Series Final earned status to play on the 2018 PGA Tour Latinoamérica.

Place	Player	Score	To par
1	(Chile) Horacio León	72-69-65-68=274	−14
2	(Chile) Benjamín Alvarado	69-71-67-67=274	−14
T3	(Mexico) Pablo Rincón	67-69-73-66=275	−13
T3	(Mexico) Cristian Romero	71-66-70-68=275	−13
5	(Argentina) Leandro Marelli	70-68-69-69=276	−12

== See also ==
- 2017 PGA Tour Canada
