= 2018 PGA Tour Latinoamérica =

Golf tour season

2018 PGA Tour Latinoamérica season
- Duration: March 15, 2018 – December 2, 2018
- Number of official events: 15
- Most wins: (United States) Michael Buttacavoli (2) (Colombia) Nico Echavarría (2)
- Order of Merit: (United States) Harry Higgs

The 2018 PGA Tour Latinoamérica was the seventh season of PGA Tour Latinoamérica, the main professional golf tour in Latin America, operated and run by the PGA Tour.

== Schedule ==
The following table lists official events during the 2018 season.

Date	Tournament	Host country	Purse (US$)	Winner (Note: The number in parentheses after each winner's name is the number of PGA Tour Latinoamérica events they had won up to and including that tournament. It is rare for someone to accumulate many wins on the PGA Tour Latinoamérica as success at this level usually leads to promotion to the Web.com Tour.)	OWGR points
Mar 18	Guatemala Stella Artois Open	Guatemala	175,000	(United States) Ben Polland (1)	6
Mar 25	Abierto Mexicano de Golf	Mexico	175,000	(United States) Austin Smotherman (1)	6
Apr 15	Abierto OSDE del Centro	Argentina	175,000	(Chile) Cristóbal del Solar (1)	6
Apr 23	Molino Cañuelas Championship	Argentina	175,000	(Argentina) Thomas Baik (1)	6
May 6	BMW Jamaica Classic	Jamaica	175,000	(United States) Michael Buttacavoli (3)	6
May 13	Costa Rica Classic	Costa Rica	175,000	(United States) Tyson Alexander (1)	6
May 20	Puerto Plata Dominican Republic Open	Dominican Republic	175,000	(Argentina) Andrés Gallegos (1)	6
Jun 3	Quito Open	Ecuador	175,000	(Chile) Horacio León (1)	6
Jun 10	Bupa Match Play	Mexico	125,000	(Finland) Toni Hakula (1)	6
Sep 16	Sao Paulo Golf Club Championship	Brazil	175,000	(Colombia) Nico Echavarría (1)	6
Sep 23	JHSF Aberto do Brasil	Brazil	175,000	(Colombia) Marcelo Rozo (3)	6
Oct 7	San Luis Championship	Mexico	175,000	(Colombia) Nico Echavarría (2)	6
Oct 14	Volvo Abierto de Chile	Chile	175,000	(United States) Jared Wolfe (2)	6
Oct 21	Diners Club Peru Open	Peru	175,000	(United States) Harry Higgs (1)	6
Nov 11	Neuquen Argentina Classic	Argentina	175,000	(Argentina) Clodomiro Carranza (2)	6
Nov 18	Visa Open de Argentina	Argentina	175,000	(Mexico) Isidro Benítez (1)	6
Dec 2	Shell Championship	United States	175,000	(United States) Michael Buttacavoli (4)	6

=== Unofficial events ===
The following events were sanctioned by the PGA Tour Latinoamérica, but did not carry official money, nor were wins official.

Date	Tournament	Host country	Purse ($)	Winner	OWGR points
Dec 15	Go Vacaciones Cozumel Cup	Mexico	120,000	PGA Tour Latinoamérica	n/a

== Order of Merit ==
The Order of Merit was based on prize money won during the season, calculated in U.S. dollars. The top five players on the Order of Merit earned status to play on the 2019 Korn Ferry Tour.

Position	Player	Prize money ($)
1	(United States) Harry Higgs	101,336
2	(Colombia) Nico Echavarría	101,272
3	(United States) Michael Buttacavoli	84,286
4	(United States) Austin Smotherman	84,064
5	(Colombia) Marcelo Rozo	83,989

== Developmental Series ==
2018 PGA Tour Latinoamérica Developmental Series season
- Duration: 14 December 2017 – 8 December 2018
- Number of official events: 14
- Dev Series Final: (Venezuela) Alfredo Adrián Ploch

The 2018 PGA Tour Latinoamérica Developmental Series was the sixth season of the PGA Tour Latinoamérica Developmental Series, the official development tour to the PGA Tour Latinoamérica between 2013 and 2023.

=== Schedule ===
The following table lists official events during the 2018 season.

Date	Tournament	Host country	Purse	Winner (Note: The number in parentheses after each winner's name is the number of PGA Tour Latinoamérica Developmental Series events they had won up to and including that tournament. As most Developmental Series events are incorporated from regional tour schedules, details of these wins are displayed there instead.)	Main tour (Note: CHL − Chilean Tour; COL − Colombian Tour; GGPM − Gira de Golf Profesional Mexicana; TPG − TPG Tour.)
Dec 17	Abierto del Caribe	Colombia	Col$125,000,000	(Colombia) Santiago Gómez	COL
Dec 17	Copa Puro Sinaloa	Mexico	Mex$1,600,000	(Mexico) Sebastián Vázquez	GGPM
Jan 28	Abierto del Sur	Argentina	Arg$700,000	(Argentina) Ricardo González	TPG
Feb 25	Copa Tequila Azulejos	Mexico	Mex$2,000,000	(Mexico) Rodolfo Cazaubón	GGPM
Apr 8	Bosque Real Classic	Mexico	Mex$1,600,000	(Mexico) Gonzalo Rubio	GGPM
Apr 15	Venezuela Open	Venezuela	US$30,000	(Venezuela) George Trujillo (1)	
Apr 29	Abierto Norpatagónico	Argentina	Arg$700,000	(Argentina) Leandro Marelli	TPG
Jun 16	Abierto Termas de Río Hondo	Argentina	Arg$1,000,000	(Uruguay) Juan Álvarez	TPG
Aug 20	Abierto Club Campestre de Medellín	Colombia	Col$100,000,000	(Colombia) Nico Echavarría	COL
Sep 9	Abierto del Club Los Lagartos	Colombia	Col$100,000,000	(Colombia) Manuel Villegas	COL
Sep 23	Abierto de Ecuador	Ecuador	US$35,000	(Ecuador) Juan Moncayo (a) (1)	
Sep 30	Abierto Hacienda Chicureo	Chile	US$25,000	(Chile) Felipe Aguilar	CHL
Nov 25	Andrés Romero Invitational	Argentina	Arg$500,000	(Chile) Mito Pereira	TPG
Dec 8	Malinalco Classic Dev Series Final	Mexico	US$40,000	(Venezuela) Alfredo Adrián Ploch (1)	

=== Dev Series Final ===
The Dev Series Final was made up of the top-five finishers of each tournament during the season. The top five finishers in the Dev Series Final earned status to play on the 2019 PGA Tour Latinoamérica.

Place	Player	Score	To par
1	(Venezuela) Alfredo Adrián Ploch	67-70-68-65=270	−18
2	(Mexico) Nicholas Maruri	70-67-66-68=271	−17
3	(Australia) Ryan Ruffels	69-70-68-66=273	−15
T4	(South Africa) Victor Lange	67-71-68-68=274	−14
T4	(Mexico) Alejandro Villasana	71-67-70-66=274	−14

== See also ==
- 2018 PGA Tour Canada
- 2018 PGA Tour China
