= Sebastián Vázquez (golfer) =

Mexican professional golfer (born 1990)

Personal information
- Nationality: Mexico
- Born: 7 November 1990 (age 35) Mexico City, Mexico
- Height: 5 ft 9 in (1.75 m)
- Weight: 154 lb (70 kg; 11.0 st)

Career
- Sport: Golf
- Turned professional: 2012
- Current tour: Gira de Golf Profesional Mexicana
- Former tours: Web.com Tour; PGA Tour Latinoamérica
- Professional wins: 9

Best results in major championships
- Masters Tournament: DNP
- PGA Championship: DNP
- U.S. Open: CUT: 2018
- The Open Championship: DNP

Achievements and awards
- Gira de Golf Profesional Mexicana Order of Merit winner: 2018–19

Sebastián Vázquez (born 7 November 1990) is a Mexican professional golfer who currently plays on the Gira de Golf Profesional Mexicana.

== Amateur career ==
Vázquez had a successful amateur career winning the Mexican Amateur in 2011 and 2012.

He also represented Mexico at the 2012 Eisenhower Trophy as part of a team with Rodolfo Cazaubón and Carlos Ortiz. Vázquez won the individual prize helping the Mexican team to a second-place finish behind the United States.

== Professional career ==
Vázquez turned professional in 2012 and immediately joined PGA Tour Latinoamérica, making his professional début at the Lexus Peru Open in November 2012. His first professional win came at the 2012 Puerto Rico Classic in just his second professional start on PGA Tour Latinoamérica.

Vázquez continued to play on PGA Tour Latinoamérica during the 2013 season but failed to win an event. He progressed through the Web.com Qualifying Tournament in 2013 to gain his playing rights on the Web.com Tour for 2014.

== Amateur wins ==
- 2011 Mexican Amateur
- 2012 Mexican Amateur Championship, Eisenhower Trophy (individual prize)

== Professional wins (9) ==
=== PGA Tour Latinoamérica wins (2) ===
No.	Date	Tournament	Winning score	Margin of victory	Runner-up
1	18 Nov 2012	Puerto Rico Classic	−14 (65-72-66-71=274)	2 strokes	(Argentina) Jorge Fernández-Valdés
2	22 May 2016	Mexico Open	−16 (63-72-68-65=268)	Playoff	(Argentina) Augusto Núñez

=== Gira de Golf Profesional Mexicana wins (7) ===
No.	Date	Tournament	Winning score	Margin of victory	Runner(s)-up
1	17 Dec 2017	Copa Puro Sinaloa	−14 (63-68-71=202)	1 stroke	(Colombia) Juan Pablo Luna, (Mexico) Carlos Ortiz, (Mexico) Armando Villarreal
2	23 Mar 2019	Copa José Miguel Nader	−9 (65-70-68=203)	Playoff	(Mexico) Isidro Benítez
3	12 May 2019	Sheriff's Invitational	−15 (67-70-69-67=273)	8 strokes	(Colombia) Camilo Aguda
4	24 Nov 2019	Amanali Classic	−18 (66-64-68=198)	3 strokes	(Mexico) Raúl Cortes
5	29 Nov 2020	Pro-Am Ventanas de San Miguel	−15 (61-65-69=195)	3 strokes	(Mexico) Juan Carlos Benítez, (Mexico) Armando Favela, (Mexico) José de Jesús Rodríguez
6	24 Apr 2022	Etapa 10	−12 (69-65-70=204)	Playoff	(Mexico) Alejandro Villasana
7	19 Dec 2025	Jaguar Open	−21 (64-66-65=195)	8 strokes	(Mexico) José Cristóbal Islas

== Team appearances ==
Amateur

- Eisenhower Trophy (representing Mexico): 2012
