= Tyler McCumber =

American professional golfer (born 1991)

Personal information
- Full name: Mark Tyler McCumber
- Nationality: United States
- Born: April 4, 1991 (age 35) Ponte Vedra Beach, Florida, U.S.
- Height: 5 ft 11 in (1.80 m)
- Weight: 175 lb (79 kg; 12.5 st)

Career
- Sport: Golf
- College: University of Florida
- Turned professional: 2013
- Current tour: PGA Tour
- Former tours: PGA Tour Canada; PGA Tour Latinoamérica; PGA Tour of Australasia; Korn Ferry Tour
- Professional wins: 7

Achievements and awards
- PGA Tour Canada Order of Merit winner: 2018

Mark Tyler McCumber (born April 4, 1991) is an American professional golfer who currently plays on the PGA Tour. He spent his first professional season on PGA Tour Latinoamérica. He is the son of professional golfer Mark McCumber, who was the 1988 Players Champion and a 10-time winner on the PGA Tour.

== Amateur career ==
McCumber attended the University of Florida, where he was a member of the Florida Gators men's golf team, All American and participated in a total of 43 events during his four years, captaining the Gators golf team in his final two seasons. During his college career, McCumber regularly finished in the top ten of events but failed to achieve a win.

== Professional career ==
After graduating from college, McCumber turned professional in 2013 and in the same year won his first professional tournament at the Florida Open. He joined PGA Tour Latinoamérica for the 2014 season. His first win on PGA Tour Latinoamérica came at the 2014 Ecuador Open. He followed this up with his second win on the tour at the 2014 TransAmerican Power Products CRV Mazatlán Open in October. He also finished fourth at the Argentine Open, fifth at the Lexus Panama Classic and eighth at the Mundo Maya Open, earning US$86,164 and third place on the Order of Merit. As a result of his earnings, McCumber earned a promotion to the Web.com Tour for 2015.

McCumber played his first PGA Tour event at the 2018 Corales Puntacana Resort and Club Championship as a Monday qualifier. He won three times on the Mackenzie Tour in 2018 and led the tour's Order of Merit to earn a return to the Web.com Tour for 2019.

== Professional wins (7) ==
=== PGA Tour Canada wins (3) ===
No.	Date	Tournament	Winning score	Margin of victory	Runner-up
1	Jul 22, 2018	Osprey Valley Open	−25 (65-61-65-72=263)	1 stroke	(United States) Michael Gellerman
2	Aug 5, 2018	Syncrude Oil Country Championship	−21 (67-68-65-63=263)	2 strokes	(United States) Ian Holt
3	Aug 19, 2018	The Players Cup	−22 (69-65-65-67=266)	2 strokes	(United States) Michael Gellerman

=== PGA Tour Latinoamérica wins (3) ===
No.	Date	Tournament	Winning score	Margin of victory	Runner(s)-up
1	Sep 28, 2014	Ecuador Open	−13 (67-67-71-70=275)	5 strokes	(Mexico) Mauricio Azcué, (Australia) Mitch Krywulycz, (Colombia) Marcelo Rozo, (Guatemala) José Toledo
2	Oct 12, 2014	TransAmerican Power Products CRV Mazatlán Open	−10 (71-71-66-70=278)	Playoff	(Argentina) Jorge Fernández-Valdés
3	Oct 23, 2016	Lexus Peru Open	−18 (69-67-66-68=270)	3 strokes	(United States) Martin Trainer

=== Other wins (1) ===
- 2013 Florida Open

== Results in The Players Championship ==
Tournament	2021
The Players Championship	T22

"T" indicates a tie for a place

== See also ==
- 2019 Korn Ferry Tour Finals graduates
