= Kent Bulle =

American professional golfer (born 1988)

Personal information
- Nationality: United States
- Born: September 15, 1988 (age 38) Glasgow, Kentucky, U.S.
- Height: 6 ft 0 in (1.83 m)
- Weight: 210 lb (95 kg; 15 st)

Career
- Sport: Golf
- College: Middle Tennessee State
- Turned professional: 2010
- Current tour: Korn Ferry Tour
- Former tour: PGA Tour Latinoamérica
- Professional wins: 3

Best results in major championships
- Masters Tournament: DNP
- PGA Championship: DNP
- U.S. Open: CUT: 2016
- The Open Championship: 77th: 2017

Kent Bulle (born September 15, 1988) is an American professional golfer.

Bulle was born in Glasgow, Kentucky. He played college golf at Middle Tennessee State before turning pro in 2010.

In 2015, Bulle won his first PGA Tour Latinoamérica title at the Visa Open de Argentina.

In 2016, Bulle qualified for the U.S. Open by earning medalist honors at his sectional qualifying site; he missed the cut. Bulle also successfully defended his title at the Visa Open de Argentina, which qualified him for the 2017 Open Championship.

== Professional wins (3) ==
=== PGA Tour Latinoamérica wins (2) ===
No.	Date	Tournament	Winning score	Margin of victory	Runner(s)-up
1	Nov 8, 2015	Visa Open de Argentina	−11 (66-67-67-69=269)	1 stroke	(Uruguay) Juan Alvarez (a)
2	Nov 20, 2016	Visa Open de Argentina (2)	−9 (71-68-65-71=275)	Playoff	(United States) James Beck III, (United States) Nate Lashley

PGA Tour Latinoamérica playoff record (1–2)

No.	Year	Tournament	Opponent(s)	Result
1	2015	Aberto do Brasil	(United States) Keith Mitchell, (Brazil) Alexandre Rocha	Rocha won with par on seveneth extra hole Bulle eliminated by par on second hole
2	2015	Lexus Peru Open	(Mexico) Rodolfo Cazaubón	Lost to birdie on first extra hole
3	2016	Visa Open de Argentina	(United States) James Beck III, (United States) Nate Lashley	Won with birdie on second extra hole Beck eliminated by birdie on first hole

=== Other wins (1) ===
- 2015 Kentucky Open

== Results in major championships ==
Tournament	2016	2017
Masters Tournament		
U.S. Open	CUT	
The Open Championship		77
PGA Championship		

Did not play

CUT = missed the half-way cut
"T" = tied for place
