= Diego Velázquez (disambiguation) =

Diego Velázquez (1599–1660) was a Spanish painter.

Diego Velázquez or Diego Velásquez may also refer to:

- Diego Velázquez de Cuéllar (1465–1524), Spanish conquistador
- Diego Velazquez (born 2001), American actor who played Billy Thunderman in The Thundermans
- Diego Velázquez, actor in Argentine films The Fish Child and The Long Night of Francisco Sanctis
- Diego Velásquez (golfer) (born 1987), Colombian professional golfer
- Diego Velasquez (baseball)

== See also ==
- Velazquez (disambiguation)
