= José de Jesús Rodríguez =

Mexican professional golfer (born 1981)

Personal information
- Full name: José de Jesús Rodríguez Martínez
- Nickname: "Camarón" (Shrimp)
- Nationality: Mexico
- Born: 22 January 1981 (age 45) Irapuato, Mexico
- Height: 5 ft 10 in (1.78 m)
- Weight: 188 lb (85 kg; 13.4 st)
- Spouse: Bianca González (m. 2004)
- Children: 2

Career
- Sport: Golf
- Turned professional: 2007
- Current tours: PGA Tour Americas; Gira de Golf Profesional Mexicana
- Former tours: PGA Tour; Korn Ferry Tour; PGA Tour Canada; PGA Tour Latinoamérica
- Professional wins: 39

Number of wins by tour
- Korn Ferry Tour: 1
- Other: 38

Achievements and awards
- Canadian Tour Order of Merit winner: 2011
- PGA Tour Latinoamérica Order of Merit winner: 2017
- Gira de Golf Profesional Mexicana Order of Merit winner: 2019–20, 2023–24
Medal record
Central American and Caribbean Games
| Silver medal – second place | 2014 Barranquilla | Individual |
| Silver medal – second place | 2023 San Salvador | Individual |

José de Jesús Rodríguez Martínez (born 22 January 1981) is a Mexican professional golfer who currently plays on the Korn Ferry Tour. Rodríguez has previously played on the PGA Tour, PGA Tour Canada, PGA Tour Latinoamérica, and the Tour de las Américas.

== Background ==
Rodríguez grew up in poverty in Irapuato, Mexico. He was one of seven siblings who slept shoulder-to-shoulder on the dirt floor of their one-room, bathroom-less adobe home. At the age of 12, he dropped out of school and began caddying full-time at Club de Golf Santa Margarita. That club is where he learned to golf. At the age of 15, Rodríguez crossed into the United States illegally by crossing the Rio Grande river. He worked in the U.S. for 10 years, mostly at a country club in Fayetteville, Arkansas as part of the maintenance crew. He worked six or seven days per week and did not have the time or money to golf.

Rodríguez sent most of his pay home to Irapuato, allowing his parents to build two homes on their piece of property. In 2006, at the age of 26, he returned to Irapuato, Mexico and began caddying again at Club de Golf Santa Margarita. Rodríguez ultimately met Alfonso Vallejo Esquivel, a wealthy club member, who saw his talent and offered to buy Rodríguez a membership at the course. Esquivel ultimately staked Rodríguez and allowed him to get his start as a pro golfer on the Mexican Tour in 2007.

Rodríguez's nickname is Camarón (shrimp), because despite his complexion, his cheeks redden in the sun.

== Professional career ==
Rodríguez turned professional in 2007 and mainly played on the Mexican Tour during 2008, although he did make three starts on the Canadian Tour making the cut in all three. He achieved his first professional win in 2008 winning the event hosted in Puebla on the Mexican Tour.

In 2009, Rodríguez played an increased schedule on the Canadian Tour but failed to record a win in any events during the season. His form on the Canadian Tour improved in 2010 where, despite a winless season, he achieved three top-three finishes in just eight starts. His good form in 2010 was also apparent on the Mexican Tour in 2010 where he achieved four victories.

2011 was a very successful season for Rodríguez on the Canadian Tour where he won consecutive events at the Mexican PGA Championship and Times Colonist Island Savings Open and went on to win the Tour's Order of Merit. During the 2011 season, Rodríguez also won two events on the Mexican Tour taking him to a total of four wins for the season.

In 2012, Rodríguez was granted membership on the inaugural season of PGA Tour Latinoamérica though his performances on the Mexican Tour and also played a reduced schedule on PGA Tour Canada. Despite not winning on either of the two development tours Rodríguez was able to win another two events on the Mexican Tour during 2012.

In 2013, Rodríguez predominantly played on PGA Tour Latinoamérica and achieved his first victory at the Roberto De Vicenzo Invitational Copa NEC which was quickly followed up with a second victory at the Arturo Calle Colombian Classic. These two victories helped Rodríguez to a second-place finish on the Tour's Order of Merit for 2013 which earned his playing card for the Web.com Tour in 2014. During 2013, Rodríguez achieved a further four wins on the Mexican Tour taking his career haul to a record of 13 wins on the tour.

Rodríguez had two wins on the PGA Tour Latinoamérica in 2017 and led the tour's Order of Merit, earning him a return to the Web.com Tour for 2018, this time with full status.

In April 2018, Rodríguez won the Web.com Tour United Leasing & Finance Championship. He ended the 2018 season with enough money to qualify for the 2019 PGA Tour. He made three of his first five cuts on the PGA Tour during the 2019 season, but finished the season 177th in the points list, necessitating a return to the Korn Ferry Tour for its 2020 season.

== Professional wins (39) ==
=== Web.com Tour wins (1) ===
| No. | Date | Tournament | Winning score | Margin of victory | Runner-up |
|---|---|---|---|---|---|
| 1 | 29 Apr 2018 | United Leasing & Finance Championship | −6 (69-73-70-70=282) | 1 stroke | (United States) Wyndham Clark |

=== PGA Tour Americas wins (1) ===
| No. | Date | Tournament | Winning score | Margin of victory | Runner-up |
|---|---|---|---|---|---|
| 1 | 31 Mar 2024 | Totalplay Championship | −14 (68-65-67-70=270) | 1 stroke | (Argentina) Jesús Montenegro |

=== Canadian Tour wins (2) ===
| No. | Date | Tournament | Winning score | Margin of victory | Runner-up |
|---|---|---|---|---|---|
| 1 | 8 May 2011 | Mexican PGA Championship | −14 (67-71-69-67=274) | Playoff | (Canada) Roger Sloan |
| 2 | 5 Jun 2011 | Times Colonist Island Savings Open | −13 (70-67-64-66=267) | 2 Strokes | (United States) Wes Homan |

=== PGA Tour Latinoamérica wins (6) ===
| No. | Date | Tournament | Winning score | Margin of victory | Runner(s)-up |
|---|---|---|---|---|---|
| 1 | 28 Apr 2013 | Roberto De Vicenzo Invitational Copa NEC | −17 (71-66-66-68=271) | Playoff | (United States) Timothy O'Neal, (Argentina) Sebastián Saavedra |
| 2 | 3 Nov 2013 | Arturo Calle Colombian Classic | −14 (67-73-65-65=270) | Playoff | (Colombia) Manuel Villegas |
| 3 | 19 Feb 2017 | Avianca Colombia Open | −15 (70-68-67-64=269) | 2 strokes | (Colombia) Nico Echavarría |
| 4 | 20 Aug 2017 | Abierto del Paraguay-Copa NEC | −11 (68-69-67-73=277) | 4 strokes | (England) Kelvin Day |
| 5 | 29 May 2022 | Jalisco Open GDL | −15 (66-67-72-64=269) | 3 strokes | (United States) Austin Hitt |
| 6 | 25 Jun 2023 | Jalisco Open GDL (2) | −20 (66-68-65-65=264) | 3 strokes | (United States) Evan Knight |

=== Gira de Golf Profesional Mexicana wins (13) ===
| No. | Date | Tournament | Winning score | Margin of victory | Runner(s)-up |
|---|---|---|---|---|---|
| 1 | 14 Jun 2017 | Etapa 2 | −12 (63-67-68=198) | 3 strokes | (Mexico) Gerardo Ruiz |
| 2 | 27 Aug 2017 | Mayakoba Open | −11 (68-66-71=205) | 2 strokes | (Mexico) Gerardo Ruiz |
| 3 | 20 Sep 2017 | Etapa 5 | −17 (66-67-66=199) | 7 strokes | (Colombia) Camilo Aguado, (Mexico) Armando Favela, (Mexico) Óscar Fraustro, (Mexico) Sebastián Vázquez |
| 4 | 17 Nov 2017 | Etapa 7 | −8 (70-66-72=208) | 1 stroke | (Mexico) Carlos Ortiz, (Mexico) Armando Villarreal |
| 5 | 13 Oct 2019 | Copa Tequila Azulejos | −10 (68-68=70=206) | 1 stroke | (Mexico) Gerardo Ruiz, (Mexico) Sebastián Vázquez |
| 6 | 7 Mar 2021 | Copa Tequila Azulejos (2) | −10 (65-70-71=206) | 1 stroke | (Colombia) Camilo Aguado |
| 7 | 5 Jun 2021 | Amanali Classic | −23 (68-60-65=193) | 7 strokes | (Mexico) Ángel Morales |
| 8 | 19 Jun 2022 | Etapa Final | −9 (72-70-64-69=275) | 1 stroke | (Guatemala) José Toledo |
| 9 | 20 May 2023 | Altozano Open | −8 (69-72-67=208) | 1 stroke | (Mexico) Óscar Serna, (Mexico) Juan Carlos Serrano |
| 10 | 21 Jan 2024 | El Salvador Open Championship | −17 (63-70-66=199) | 9 strokes | (Mexico) Armando Favela, (Argentina) Mateo Fernández de Oliveira |
| 11 | 12 Apr 2025 | El Campanario Classic | −13 (66-67-70=203) | 3 strokes | (Mexico) José Dibildox |
| 12 | 22 Nov 2025 | Copa Multimedios | −15 (66-62-70=198) | Playoff | (Mexico) José Cristóbal Islas |
| 13 | 21 Sep 2026 | Atlas Open | −25 (65-65-61=191) | 8 strokes | (Mexico) José Cristóbal Islas |

=== Colombian Tour wins (1) ===
| No. | Date | Tournament | Winning score | Margin of victory | Runners-up |
|---|---|---|---|---|---|
| 1 | 31 Jul 2023 | Abierto de Colombia | −16 (65-68-61-74=268) | 4 strokes | (Colombia) Ómar Beltrán, (Peru) Julián Périco |

=== PGA Tour Latinoamérica Developmental Series wins (1) ===
| No. | Date | Tournament | Winning score | Margin of victory | Runners-up |
|---|---|---|---|---|---|
| 1 | 22 Nov 2015 | Baja California Open | −5 (69-74-68=211) | 1 stroke | (Mexico) Cristian Romero, (Mexico) Óscar Serna |

=== Mexico Golf Tour wins (14) ===
- 2008 Puebla
- 2010 Guadalajara, Mazatlan, Puebla, Mexico City
- 2011 Guadalajara, Torreon
- 2012 Yucatán, Monterrey
- 2013 Yucatán, Veracruz, San Luis Potosí, Chihuahua
- 2018 Querétaro

== Team appearances ==
Professional

- World Cup (representing Mexico): 2011
- Aruba Cup (representing PGA Tour Latinoamérica): 2017

== See also ==
- 2018 Web.com Tour Finals graduates
