= Daniel Mazziotta =

American professional golfer (born 1988)

Personal information
- Nationality: United States
- Born: September 20, 1988 (age 38) Fort Myers, Florida, U.S.
- Height: 1.82 m (5 ft 11 1/2 in)
- Weight: 68 kg (150 lb; 10.7 st)

Career
- Sport: Golf
- College: Florida Gulf Coast University
- Turned professional: 2011
- Former tours: Web.com Tour; PGA Tour Latinoamérica; PGA Tour Canada
- Professional wins: 9

Daniel Mazziotta (born September 20, 1988) is an American professional golfer who played on PGA Tour Latinoamérica and Web.com Tour.

Mazziotta had a successful college career at Florida Gulf Coast University. He graduated in 2011 with the second best scoring average in the program. He was selected to the Atlantic Sun All-Conference first team in successive years in 2010 and 2011.

Turning pro in 2011, Mazziotta initially played his golf on the NGA Pro Golf Tour and the West Florida Golf Tour achieving a combined total of six victories, one on the NGA Pro Golf Tour and five on the West Florida Golf Tour, before earning his PGA Tour Latinoamérica playing rights for the 2014 season.

Mazziotta's first win on PGA Tour Latinoamérica came at the 2014 Mundo Maya Open in just his fourth start on the tour.

== Professional wins (9) ==
=== PGA Tour Latinoamérica wins (2) ===
No.	Date	Tournament	Winning score	Margin of victory	Runners-up
1	Apr 6, 2014	Mundo Maya Open	−10 (69-72-69-68=278)	4 strokes	(United States) Bryan Bigley, (Canada) Peter Campbell, (Mexico) Rodolfo Cazaubón, (United States) Rick Cochran III, (United States) Brad Hopfinger, (United States) Robert Rohanna
2	Dec 6, 2015	PGA Tour Latinoamérica Tour Championship	−11 (68-68-69-6=273)	4 strokes	(United States) Ken Looper, (Guatemala) José Toledo

=== NGA Hooters Tour wins (1) ===
- 2012 Winter Series

=== West Florida Golf Tour wins (5) ===
- 5 events on the West Florida Golf Tour

=== Other wins (1) ===
- 2022 Wisconsin State Open
