= 2016 PGA Tour Latinoamérica =

Golf tour season

2016 PGA Tour Latinoamérica season
- Duration: February 25, 2016 – December 4, 2016
- Number of official events: 18
- Most wins: (United States) Nate Lashley (3)
- Order of Merit: (United States) Nate Lashley

The 2016 PGA Tour Latinoamérica was the fifth season of PGA Tour Latinoamérica, the main professional golf tour in Latin America, operated and run by the PGA Tour.

== Schedule ==
The following table lists official events during the 2016 season.

Date	Tournament	Host country	Purse (US$)	Winner (Note: The number in parentheses after each winner's name is the number of PGA Tour Latinoamérica events they had won up to and including that tournament. It is rare for someone to accumulate many wins on the PGA Tour Latinoamérica as success at this level usually leads to promotion to the Web.com Tour.)	OWGR points
Feb 28	Avianca Colombia Open	Colombia	175,000	(United States) Justin Hueber (2)	6
Mar 20	Lexus Panama Classic	Panama	175,000	(United States) Derek Rende (1)	6
Apr 17	Abierto del Centro	Argentina	175,000	(United States) Anthony Paolucci (1)	6
Apr 24	Guatemala Stella Artois Open	Guatemala	175,000	(United States) John Young Kim (1)	6
May 8	Honduras Open	Honduras	175,000	(United States) Sam Fidone (1)	6
May 14	Casa de Campo Dominican Republic Open	Dominican Republic	175,000	(United States) Timothy O'Neal (3)	6
May 22	Mexico Open	Mexico	175,000	(Mexico) Sebastián Vázquez (2)	6
May 29	Mazatlán Open	Mexico	175,000	(United States) Martin Trainer (1)	6
Sep 4	Flor de Caña Open	Nicaragua	175,000	(Argentina) Augusto Núñez (1)	6
Sep 11	San Luis Championship	Mexico	175,000	(United States) Nate Lashley (1)	6
Sep 18	Copa Diners Club International	Ecuador	175,000	(United States) Nate Lashley (2)	6
Sep 25	Aberto do Brasil	Brazil	175,000	(Argentina) Jorge Fernández-Valdés (3)	6
Oct 16	Roberto De Vicenzo Punta del Este Open Copa NEC	Uruguay	175,000	(Chile) Mito Pereira (1)	6
Oct 23	Lexus Peru Open	Peru	175,000	(United States) Tyler McCumber (3)	6
Oct 30	Colombia Classic	Colombia	175,000	(Colombia) Andrés Echavarría (1)	6
Nov 13	Argentina Classic	Argentina	175,000	(Spain) Samuel Del Val (1)	6
Nov 20	Visa Open de Argentina	Argentina	175,000	(United States) Kent Bulle (2)	7
Dec 4	Shell Championship	United States	175,000	(United States) Nate Lashley (3)	6

=== Unofficial events ===
The following events were sanctioned by the PGA Tour Latinoamérica, but did not carry official money, nor were wins official.

Date	Tournament	Host country	Purse ($)	Winner	OWGR points
Dec 17	Aruba Cup	Aruba	120,000	PGA Tour Latinoamérica	n/a

== Order of Merit ==
The Order of Merit was based on prize money won during the season, calculated in U.S. dollars. The top five players on the Order of Merit earned status to play on the 2017 Web.com Tour.

Position	Player	Prize money ($)
1	(United States) Nate Lashley	140,897
2	(Argentina) Augusto Núñez	121,373
3	(Chile) Mito Pereira	104,784
4	(Argentina) Emilio Domínguez	82,404
5	(Spain) Samuel Del Val	80,547

== Developmental Series ==
2016 PGA Tour Latinoamérica Developmental Series season
- Duration: 11 February 2016 – 10 December 2016
- Number of official events: 13
- Dev Series Final: (Colombia) Marcelo Rozo

The 2016 PGA Tour Latinoamérica Developmental Series was the fourth season of the PGA Tour Latinoamérica Developmental Series, the official development tour to the PGA Tour Latinoamérica between 2013 and 2023.

=== Schedule ===
The following table lists official events during the 2016 season.

Date	Tournament	Host country	Purse	Winner (Note: The number in parentheses after each winner's name is the number of PGA Tour Latinoamérica Developmental Series events they had won up to and including that tournament. As most Developmental Series events are incorporated from regional tour schedules, details of these wins are displayed there instead.)	Main tour (Note: CHL − Chilean Tour; COL − Colombian Tour; TPG − TPG Tour.)
Feb 14	Abierto del Sur	Argentina	Arg$550,000	(Argentina) Francisco Bidé	TPG
Apr 10	Abierto Norpatagónico	Argentina	Arg$550,000	(Argentina) Sebastián Saavedra	TPG
Apr 17	Venezuela Open	Venezuela	US$30,000	(Venezuela) Denis Meneghini (2)	
May 29	Abierto del Carmel	Colombia	Col$90,000,000	(Colombia) Jesús Rivas	COL
Aug 21	Abierto del Paraguay	Paraguay	US$40,000	(Chile) Horacio León (1)	
Aug 21	Abierto Campestre de Medellín	Colombia	Col$90,000,000	(Colombia) Santiago Tobón	COL
Oct 9	Bolivia Open Mitsuba	Bolivia	US$50,000	(Bolivia) Sebastian MacLean (2)	
Oct 22	Abierto de Valle Arriba	Venezuela	US$30,000	(Venezuela) Otto Solís (1)	
Oct 23	Abierto de Serrezuela	Colombia	Col$70,000,000	(Colombia) Ómar Beltrán	COL
Nov 27	Abierto del Litoral	Argentina	Arg$550,000	(Argentina) Thomas Baik	TPG
Dec 4	Abierto de Chile	Chile	US$40,000	(Chile) Felipe Aguilar	CHL
Dec 4	Andrés Romero Invitational	Argentina	Arg$500,000	(Argentina) Fabián Gómez	TPG
Dec 10	Malinalco Classic Dev Series Final	Mexico	US$40,000	(Colombia) Marcelo Rozo (1)	

=== Dev Series Final ===
The Dev Series Final was made up of the top-five finishers of each tournament during the season. The top five finishers in the Dev Series Final earned status to play on the 2017 PGA Tour Latinoamérica.

Place	Player	Score	To par
1	(Colombia) Marcelo Rozo	66-70-71-69=276	−12
2	(Japan) Eric Sugimoto	69-68-68-71=276	−12
T3	(Colombia) Nico Echavarría (a)	64-70-71-73=279	−9
T3	(Argentina) Julián Lerda	68-66-69-76=279	−9
5	(United States) Brad Brunner	72-73-69-66=280	−8

== See also ==
- 2016 PGA Tour Canada
- 2016 PGA Tour China
