= 2015 PGA Tour Latinoamérica =

Golf tour season

2015 PGA Tour Latinoamérica season
- Duration: March 19, 2015 – December 6, 2015
- Number of official events: 18
- Most wins: (Mexico) Rodolfo Cazaubón (3)
- Order of Merit: (Mexico) Rodolfo Cazaubón

The 2015 PGA Tour Latinoamérica was the fourth season of PGA Tour Latinoamérica, the main professional golf tour in Latin America, operated and run by the PGA Tour.

== Schedule ==
The following table lists official events during the 2015 season.

Date	Tournament	Host country	Purse (US$)	Winner (Note: The number in parentheses after each winner's name is the number of PGA Tour Latinoamérica events they had won up to and including that tournament. It is rare for someone to accumulate many wins on the PGA Tour Latinoamérica as success at this level usually leads to promotion to the Web.com Tour.)	OWGR points
Mar 22	Avianca Colombia Open	Colombia	175,000	(Colombia) Diego Velásquez (1)	6
Mar 29	Mazatlán Open	Mexico	175,000	(Argentina) Tommy Cocha (2)	6
Apr 19	Abierto del Centro	Argentina	175,000	(Argentina) Tommy Cocha (3)	7
May 3	Lexus Panama Classic	Panama	175,000	(Mexico) Rodolfo Cazaubón (1)	6
May 17	Mexico Open	Mexico	175,000	(United States) Justin Hueber (1)	6
May 24	Guatemala Stella Artois Open	Guatemala	175,000	(United States) Danny Balin (1)	6
May 31	Honduras Open	Honduras	175,000	(Venezuela) Felipe Velázquez (1)	6
Jun 7	Dominican Republic Open	Dominican Republic	175,000	(Mexico) Rodolfo Cazaubón (2)	6
Sep 13	All you need is Ecuador Open	Ecuador	175,000	(Colombia) Ricardo Celia (1)	6
Sep 20	Volvo Colombian Classic	Colombia	175,000	(Australia) Mitch Krywulycz (1)	6
Sep 27	Aberto do Brasil	Brazil	175,000	(Brazil) Alexandre Rocha (1)	6
Oct 4	Hyundai - BBVA Abierto de Chile	Chile	175,000	(Canada) Wil Bateman (1)	6
Oct 18	Mundo Maya Open	Mexico	175,000	(United States) Nicholas Lindheim (2)	6
Nov 1	Roberto De Vicenzo Punta del Este Open Copa NEC	Uruguay	175,000	(United States) Lanto Griffin (1)	6
Nov 8	Visa Open de Argentina	Argentina	175,000	(United States) Kent Bulle (1)	7
Nov 15	Personal Classic	Argentina	175,000	(Argentina) Fabián Gómez (3)	7
Nov 22	Lexus Peru Open	Peru	175,000	(Mexico) Rodolfo Cazaubón (3)	6
Dec 6	PGA Tour Latinoamérica Tour Championship	Puerto Rico	200,000	(United States) Daniel Mazziotta (2)	6

=== Unofficial events ===
The following events were sanctioned by the PGA Tour Latinoamérica, but did not carry official money, nor were wins official.

Date	Tournament	Host country	Purse ($)	Winners	OWGR points
Oct 25	Bridgestone America's Golf Cup	Mexico	650,000	(United States) Justin Hueber and (United States) Matt Kuchar	n/a

== Order of Merit ==
The Order of Merit was based on prize money won during the season, calculated in U.S. dollars. The top five players on the Order of Merit earned status to play on the 2016 Web.com Tour.

Position	Player	Prize money ($)
1	(Mexico) Rodolfo Cazaubón	129,203
2	(United States) Kent Bulle	112,874
3	(Puerto Rico) Rafael Campos	74,666
4	(Brazil) Alexandre Rocha	71,930
5	(Argentina) Tommy Cocha	70,342

== Developmental Series ==
2015 PGA Tour Latinoamérica Developmental Series season
- Duration: 5 February 2015 – 13 December 2015
- Number of official events: 14
- Dev Series Final: (Argentina) Matías Simaski

The 2015 PGA Tour Latinoamérica Developmental Series was the third season of the PGA Tour Latinoamérica Developmental Series, the official development tour to the PGA Tour Latinoamérica between 2013 and 2023.

=== Schedule ===
The following table lists official events during the 2015 season.

Date	Tournament	Host country	Purse	Winner (Note: The number in parentheses after each winner's name is the number of PGA Tour Latinoamérica Developmental Series events they had won up to and including that tournament. As most Developmental Series events are incorporated from regional tour schedules, details of these wins are displayed there instead.)	Main tour (Note: COL − Colombian Tour; TPG − TPG Tour.)
Feb 8	Abierto del Sur	Argentina	Arg$450,000	(Argentina) Francisco Bidé	TPG
Apr 12	Abierto Norpatagónico	Argentina	Arg$450,000	(Argentina) Emilio Domínguez	TPG
Apr 19	Venezuela Open	Venezuela	US$50,000	(Venezuela) Rafael Guerrero (1)	
Jul 12	Abierto de Bucaramanga	Colombia	Col$100,000,000	(Colombia) Sebastián Muñoz	COL
Aug 16	Abierto de Paraguay Copa NEC	Paraguay	US$40,000	(Paraguay) Fabrizio Zanotti (1)	
Aug 23	Abierto de Club Campestre Medellín	Colombia	Col$100,000,000	(Colombia) Sebastián Muñoz	COL
Sep 13	Riviera Nayarit Open	Mexico	US$92,000	(Argentina) Daniel Barbetti (1)	
Sep 27	Abierto de Barquisimeto	Venezuela	US$50,000	(Venezuela) Denis Meneghini (1)	
Oct 10	Bolivia Open Mitsuba	Bolivia	US$50,000	(Argentina) César Costilla (1)	
Nov 22	Baja California Open	Mexico	US$92,000	(Mexico) José de Jesús Rodríguez (1)	
Nov 28	CBG Pro Tour Etapa Curitiba	Brazil	US$25,000	(Brazil) Rodrigo Lee (1)	
Nov 29	Abierto del Litoral	Argentina	Arg$450,000	(Argentina) Rafael Gómez	TPG
Dec 6	Andrés Romero Invitational	Argentina	Arg$400,000	(Argentina) Jorge Monroy	TPG
Dec 13	Copa Diners Club-Mitad del Mundo Dev Series Final	Ecuador	US$50,000	(Argentina) Matías Simaski (a) (1)	

=== Dev Series Final ===
The Dev Series Final was made up of the top-five finishers of each tournament during the season. The top five finishers in the Dev Series Final earned status to play on the 2016 PGA Tour Latinoamérica.

Place	Player	Score	To par
1	(Argentina) Matías Simaski (a)	67-66-66-70=269	−15
2	(Mexico) Juan Diego Fernandez	71-68-70-64=273	−11
T3	(Mexico) José de Jesús Rodríguez	70-71-68-67=276	−8
T3	(Argentina) Alan Wagner	71-69-67-69=276	−8
5	(Argentina) Luciano Giometti	70-68-69-70=277	−7

== See also ==
- 2015 PGA Tour Canada
- 2015 PGA Tour China
