= TransAmerican Power Products CRV Open =

Men's professional golf tournament

Tournament information
- Location: Zapopan, Mexico
- Established: 2012
- Course: Las Lomas Club de Golf
- Par: 71
- Length: 6,724 yards (6,148 m)
- Tour: PGA Tour Latinoamérica
- Format: Stroke play
- Prize fund: US$150,000
- Month played: March
- Final year: 2014

Tournament record score
- Aggregate: 267 Marcelo Rozo (2014)
- To par: −18 Ariel Cañete (2012)

Final champion
- (Colombia) Marcelo Rozo
- Location in Mexico Location in Jalisco

The TransAmerican Power Products CRV Open was a men's professional golf tournament held in Mexico on PGA Tour Latinoamérica. The tournament was first played in 2012 at La Herradura Golf Club and the inaugural winner of the event was Ariel Cañete.

The tournament was never held at the same venue twice, having been played at the Atlas Country Club in 2013 when Manuel Villegas was victorious, before moving to Las Lomas Club de Golf in 2014 when Marcelo Rozo emerged as the winner after a rare seven-man playoff, something which has never happened on the PGA Tour.

== Winners ==
| Year | Winner | Score | To par | Margin of victory | Runner(s)-up | Venue | Ref. |
TransAmerican Power Products CRV Open
| 2014 | (Colombia) Marcelo Rozo | 267 | −17 | Playoff | (Mexico) Mauricio Azcué (United States) Rick Cochran III (Mexico) Roberto Díaz (Argentina) Lucho Dodd (Argentina) Julián Etulain (United States) Matt Ryan | Las Lomas | |
| 2013 | (Colombia) Manuel Villegas | 276 | −8 | 1 stoke | (Mexico) José de Jesús Rodríguez | Atlas | |
TransAmerican Power Products Open
| 2012 | (Argentina) Ariel Cañete | 270 | −18 | 2 strokes | (Argentina) Tommy Cocha | La Herradura | |
