= Ryan Sullivan (golfer) =

American professional golfer (born 1989)

Personal information
- Full name: Ryan Nicholas Sullivan
- Nationality: United States
- Born: May 3, 1989 (age 37) Atlanta, Georgia, U.S.
- Height: 5 ft 11 in (1.80 m)
- Weight: 160 lb (73 kg; 11 st)

Career
- Sport: Golf
- Turned professional: 2012
- Former tours: Web.com Tour; PGA Tour Latinoamérica eGolf Professional Tour
- Professional wins: 2

Best results in major championships
- Masters Tournament: DNP
- PGA Championship: DNP
- U.S. Open: CUT: 2013, 2019
- The Open Championship: DNP

Ryan Nicholas Sullivan (born May 3, 1989) is an American professional golfer who formerly played on the Web.com Tour and PGA Tour Latinoamérica.

== Professional career ==
Sullivan turned professional in 2012 and initially played on the eGolf Professional Tour before becoming a member of the Web.com Tour and PGA Tour Latinoamérica for the 2013 season.

In 2013, Sullivan mainly played on PGA Tour Latinoamérica, having made two starts on the Web.com Tour. His first win as a professional came on PGA Tour Latinoamérica at the Puerto Rico Classic

Sullivan qualified for the 2013 U.S. Open for his first appearance in a major championship but failed to make the cut following rounds of 81 and 82. He qualified for the U.S.Open again in 2019 by shooting two under at Woodmont Country Club, tying for 3 and received one of the sectionals four qualifying spots.

== Amateur wins ==
- 2009 North Carolina Players Championship
- 2010 North Carolina Players Championship
- 2011 North Carolina Players Championship

== Professional wins (2) ==
=== PGA Tour Latinoamérica wins (1) ===
No.	Date	Tournament	Winning score	Margin of victory	Runners-up
1	Oct 13, 2013	Puerto Rico Classic	−11 (74-69-65=205) (Note: Shortened to 54 holes due to weather.)	1 stroke	(Spain) Samuel Del Val, (Mexico) Armando Favela

=== eGolf Professional Tour wins (1) ===
No.	Date	Tournament	Winning score	Margin of victory	Runner-up
1	Apr 24, 2015	Sedgefield Classic	−4 (69-68-69=206)	2 strokes	(Canada) Cam Burke

== Results in major championships ==
Tournament	2013	2014	2015	2016	2017	2018
Masters Tournament						
U.S. Open	CUT					
The Open Championship						
PGA Championship						

Tournament	2019
Masters Tournament	
PGA Championship	
U.S. Open	CUT
The Open Championship	

Did not play

CUT = missed the half-way cut
"T" = tied
