= Puerto Rico Classic =

Former men's professional golf tournament

Tournament information
- Location: Dorado, Puerto Rico
- Established: 2012
- Courses: Dorado Beach Resort (East Course)
- Par: 72
- Length: 7,000 yards (6,400 m)
- Tour: PGA Tour Latinoamérica
- Format: Stroke play
- Prize fund: US$150,000
- Month played: November
- Final year: 2013

Tournament record score
- Aggregate: 274 Sebastián Vázquez (2012)
- To par: −14 as above

Final champion
- (United States) Ryan Sullivan
- Location in Puerto Rico

The Puerto Rico Classic was a men's professional golf tournament hosted by the Puerto Rico Golf Association and was an event on PGA Tour Latinoamérica from 2012 to 2013.

The tournament was hosted at the Dorado Beach Resort in both years and the inaugural winner of the event was Sebastián Vázquez.

The 2013 Puerto Rico Classic was played over a shortened 54 holes format following severe weather suspensions. This was to be the final running of the tournament as its status was not renewed on the 2014 PGA Tour Latinoamérica schedule.

== Winners ==
Year	Winner	Score	To par	Margin of victory	Runner(s)-up	Ref.
2013	(United States) Ryan Sullivan	205 (Note: Shortened to 54 holes due to weather.)	−11	1 stroke	(Spain) Samuel Del Val (Mexico) Armando Favela	
2012	(Mexico) Sebastián Vázquez	274	−14	2 strokes	(Argentina) Jorge Fernández-Valdés	
