= Alexandre Rocha =

Brazilian professional golfer (born 1977)

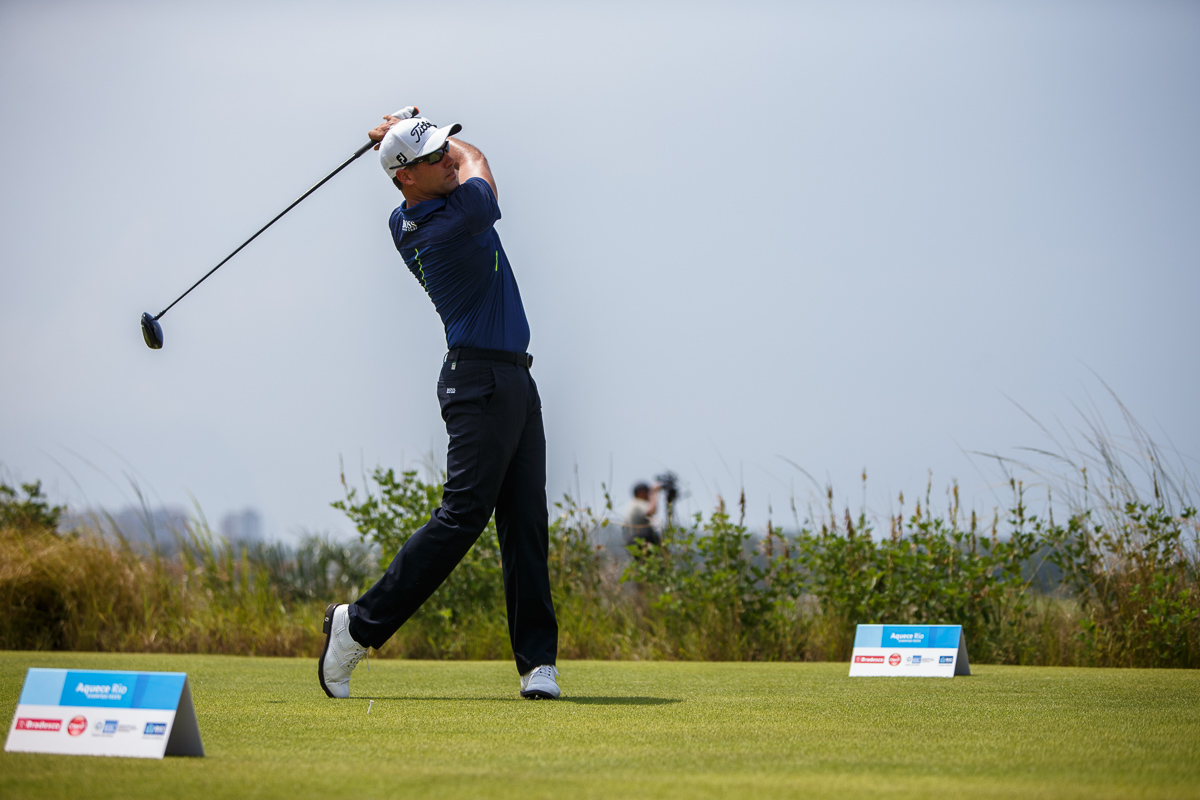

Personal information
- Full name: Alexandre Nardy Rocha
- Nationality: Brazil
- Born: 21 November 1977 (age 48) São Paulo, Brazil
- Height: 1.83 m (6 ft 0 in)
- Weight: 79 kg (174 lb; 12.4 st)

Career
- Sport: Golf
- College: Mississippi State University
- Turned professional: 2000
- Current tour: Gira de Golf Profesional Mexicana
- Former tours: PGA Tour; European Tour; Asian Tour; Web.com Tour; PGA Tour Americas; Canadian Tour; PGA Tour Latinoamérica; Tour de las Américas
- Professional wins: 16

Best results in major championships
- Masters Tournament: DNP
- PGA Championship: DNP
- U.S. Open: T68: 2011
- The Open Championship: DNP

Alexandre Nardy Rocha (Note: This name uses Portuguese naming customs: the first or maternal family name is Nardy and the second or paternal family name is Rocha.) (born 21 November 1977) is a Brazilian professional golfer.

== Early life and amateur career ==
Rocha was born in São Paulo. He had a successful collegiate career in the United States where he attended Mississippi State University.

== Professional career ==
In 2000, Rocha turned pro. He won tournaments in South America and Canada before qualifying for the European Tour at the end of 2005. He did not win enough money during his rookie season to retain his playing status and returned to qualifying school where he was the joint winner alongside Carlos Rodiles.

Having lost his card on the European Tour again at the end of the 2009 season, Rocha qualified for the Asian Tour for 2010. In 2010, Rocha became the second Brazilian (after Jaime Gonzalez, who played on the PGA Tour up until 1982) to join the PGA Tour when he graduated from Qualifying School. Rocha finished 127th in the 2011 FedEx Cup standings, then lost his PGA Tour card after 2012. He played on the Web.com Tour in 2013 and 2014 before spending 2015 on PGA Tour Latinoamérica.

== Amateur wins ==
- 1992 South American Championship
- 1993 Brazil National Junior Championship
- 1994 Brazil National Championship
- 1995 Brazil National Junior Championship, South American Championship
- 1997 Brazil National Championship

== Professional wins (16) ==
=== PGA Tour Latinoamérica wins (2) ===
No.	Date	Tournament	Winning score	Margin of victory	Runner(s)-up
1	27 Sep 2015	Aberto do Brasil	−17 (68-65-67-67=267)	Playoff	(United States) Kent Bulle, (United States) Keith Mitchell
2	8 Mar 2020	Estrella del Mar Open	−29 (65-67-65-62=259)	3 strokes	(Mexico) Álvaro Ortiz

=== Tour de las Américas wins (1) ===
No.	Date	Tournament	Winning score	Margin of victory	Runners-up
1	28 Jan 2001	Rabobank Masters de Chile	−15 (65-69-67-64=265)	2 strokes	(Paraguay) Ángel Franco, (United States) Dan Olsen

=== Gira de Golf Profesional Mexicana wins (4) ===
No.	Date	Tournament	Winning score	Margin of victory	Runner(s)-up
1	16 Feb 2019	Copa Prissa	−11 (71-66-68=205)	2 strokes	(Mexico) Cristian Romero
2	11 Jun 2023	Pro-Am Ventanas de San Miguel	−14 (66-63-67=196)	Playoff	(Mexico) Isidro Benítez
3	18 Aug 2023	Club de Golf México Invitational	−13 (66-70-67=203)	2 strokes	(Mexico) Luis Garza, (Mexico) Álvaro Ortiz
4	12 May 2024	Tour Championship	−15 (67-66-65-67=265)	2 strokes	(Mexico) Luis Garza, (Mexico) Óscar Serna

=== Colombian Tour wins (1) ===
No.	Date	Tournament	Winning score	Margin of victory	Runner-up
1	28 Jul 2024	Abierto de Colombia	−12 (71-69-66-70=276)	6 strokes	(Colombia) Iván Camilo Ramírez

=== Other wins (8) ===
- 2000 San Fernando Open (Brazil)
- 2002 Sofitel Rio de Janeiro Pro-Am (Brazil)
- 2003 Brasília DF Open (Brazil), Club de Campo Open (Brazil), Curitiba Open (Brazil), Casino de Charlevoix Cup (with Bryn Parry)
- 2004 Little Rock Maverick Tour Classic (United States)
- 2008 Marbella Open (Chile)

== Playoff record ==
Challenge Tour playoff record (0–1)

No.	Year	Tournament	Opponents	Result
1	2008	Trophée du Golf Club de Genève	(Netherlands) Wil Besseling, (Sweden) Klas Eriksson	Eriksson won with birdie on fourth extra hole Rocha eliminated by par on third hole

== Results in major championships ==
Tournament	2011
Masters Tournament	
U.S. Open	T68
The Open Championship	
PGA Championship	

Did not play

CUT = missed the half-way cut
"T" = tied

== Team appearances ==
Amateur

- Eisenhower Trophy (representing Brazil): 1994, 1996, 1998

Professional

- World Cup (representing Brazil): 2013

== See also ==
- 2005 European Tour Qualifying School graduates
- 2006 European Tour Qualifying School graduates
- 2008 Challenge Tour graduates
- 2010 PGA Tour Qualifying School graduates
- 2011 PGA Tour Qualifying School graduates
