= Colombian Open =

Annual golf tournament

Tournament information
- Location: Pereira, Colombia
- Established: 1945
- Course: Barranquilla Country Club
- Par: 72
- Length: 6,640 yards (6,070 m)
- Tours: PGA Tour Latinoamérica; Tour de las Américas; Colombian Tour
- Format: Stroke play
- Prize fund: COL$300,000,000
- Month played: October

Tournament record score
- Aggregate: 262 Jerry Pate (1981); 262 Gustavo Mendoza (1997)
- To par: –26 as above

Current champion
- (Colombia) Juan Camilo Vesga

Location map
- Location in Colombia

The Colombian Open, or Abierto de Colombia, is a golf tournament on the Colombian Tour and PGA Tour Latinoamérica that was first played in 1945. It has also on occasion been an event on the Tour de las Américas.

In 2001, Camilo Villegas won a record fifth consecutive amateur prize, at the same time becoming only the second amateur to take the overall title.

== Winners ==
Year	Tour (Note: COL − Colombian Tour; PGATLA − PGA Tour Latinoamérica; TLA − Tour de las Américas.)	Winner	Score	To par	Margin of victory	Runner(s)-up	Venue
Abierto de Colombia
2026	COL	(Colombia) Juan Camilo Vesga (2)	278	−10	3 strokes	(Brazil) Alexandre Rocha	Barranquilla
2025	COL	(Colombia) Juan Camilo Vesga	275	−13	8 strokes	(Colombia) Omar Beltrán	Pueblo Viejo
2024	COL	(Brazil) Alexandre Rocha	276	−12	6 strokes	(Colombia) Iván Camilo Ramírez	Club Campestre de Medellín
2023	COL	(Mexico) José de Jesús Rodríguez (2)	268	−16	4 strokes	(Colombia) Ómar Beltrán (Peru) Julián Périco	Club Campestre de Pereira
2022	COL	(Colombia) Camilo Aguado	275	−9	5 strokes	(Colombia) Juan Sebastián Roa	Club Campestre de Cali
2021	COL	(Colombia) Jesús Amaya (4)	278	−10	2 strokes	(Colombia) David Vanegas	Lagos de Caujaral
2020: No tournament
Cartagena-Karibana Colombian Open
2019	COL	(Argentina) Augusto Núñez	266	−22	3 strokes	(Argentina) Alejandro Tosti	TPC Cartagena
2018	COL	(Colombia) Marcelo Rozo	200 (Note: Shortened to 54 holes due to weather.)	−16	1 stroke	(Colombia) Nico Echavarría	TPC Cartagena
Avianca Colombia Open
2017	PGATLA	(Mexico) José de Jesús Rodríguez	269	−15	2 strokes	(Colombia) Nico Echavarría	Club Campestre Guaymaral
2016	PGATLA	(United States) Justin Hueber	267	−21	5 strokes	(Chile) Mito Pereira	Club Campestre de Medellín
2015	PGATLA	(Colombia) Diego Velásquez	266	−18	6 strokes	(United States) Alex Moon	Los Lagartos
Arturo Calle Colombian Open
2014	PGATLA	(Colombia) David Vanegas	263	−17	3 strokes	(United States) Rick Cochran III (Colombia) Andrés Echavarría	Ruitoque
2013	PGATLA	(United States) Timothy O'Neal	268	−16	2 strokes	(Mexico) Óscar Serna	Club Campestre de Pereira
2012	PGATLA	(Argentina) Matías O'Curry	279	−9	8 strokes	(Colombia) Andrés Echavarría (Argentina) Nelson Ledesma	El Rincón de Cajicá
Colombian Open
2011		(Colombia) Álvaro Arizabaleta	275	−9	1 stroke	(Colombia) Manuel Villegas	Club Campestre de Cali
Abierto de Colombia
2010	TLA	(Argentina) Julián Etulain	267	−21	3 strokes	(Argentina) Rodolfo González (Colombia) David Vanegas	Club Campestre Guaymaral
Colombian Open
2009		(Argentina) Daniel Barbetti	279	−9		(Argentina) Paulo Pinto	Barranquilla
2008		(Colombia) Manuel Villegas	272	−8		(Argentina) Rafael Gómez (Argentina) Clodomiro Carranza	Los Lagartos
2007		(Colombia) Diego Vanegas	292	+4	Playoff	(Colombia) José Manuel Garrido	El Rincón de Cajicá
2006	TLA	(Colombia) Manuel Merizalde	280	−4	2 strokes	(Colombia) Alvaro Pinedo	Club Campestre de Cali
2005		(Colombia) Jesús Amaya (3)	282	−6		(Colombia) Luis Zapata	Club Campestre de Guaymaral
2004		(Colombia) Jesús Amaya (2)	203	−13		(Colombia) Ángel Romero	Lagos de Caujaral
2003		(Colombia) Mario Julián Hurtado	277	−11		(Colombia) Jesús Amaya (Colombia) Gustavo Mendoza	Pueblo Viejo
2002		(Colombia) Gustavo Mendoza (2)	275	−13	Playoff	(Colombia) Jesús Amaya	Club Campestre de Guaymaral
2001		(Colombia) Camilo Villegas (a)	270	−14		(Colombia) Jesús Amaya	Club Campestre de Pereira
2000		(Colombia) Rafael Romero	279	−9			Country Club de Bogotá
1999		(Colombia) Rigoberto Velásquez (2)	286	−2			Club Farallones
1998		(Argentina) Miguel Guzmán	271	−17		(Paraguay) Ángel Franco (Argentina) Rafael Gómez	Hato Grande
1997		(Colombia) Gustavo Mendoza	262	−26			Club Campestre de Bucaramanga
1996		(Canada) Arden Knoll	272	−16	Playoff		San Andrés
1995		(Colombia) José Lisandro Gómez (2)	287	+3			Club Campestre de Cali
1994		(Colombia) Ángel Romero	276	−8			La Sabana
1993		(Colombia) Jesús Amaya	276	−12			El Rodeo
1992		(Argentina) Armando Saavedra	278	−10			Country Club de Bogotá
1991		(Chile) Roy Mackenzie	290	+2			Condominio Campestre El Peñón
1990		(Peru) Miguel Tola	285	−3			Barranquilla
1989		(Colombia) Luis Alfredo Puerto (2)	288	E			El Rincón de Cajicá
1988		(Colombia) Liborio Zapata	285	+1			Club Campestre de Cali
1987		(Colombia) José Lisandro Gómez	286	−2			San Andrés
1986		(Colombia) Rigoberto Velásquez	284	−4			Club Campestre de Bucaramanga
1985		(Colombia) Luis Alfredo Puerto	277	−3			Carmel Club
1984		(Colombia) Rogelio González (5)	290	−2			Club Farallones
1983		(Colombia) Víctor Blanco	205	−11			Los Lagartos
1982: No tournament
1981		(United States) Jerry Pate	262	−26	21 strokes	(Colombia) Luis Arevalo	Los Lagartos
1980		(West Germany) Bernhard Langer	279	−9	6 strokes	(Brazil) Jaime Gonzalez (United States) Mike White (England) John Morgan	Country Club de Bogotá
1979		(Scotland) Sam Torrance	273	−11	3 strokes	(United States) Ray Carrasco	Club Campestre de Cali
1978		(Colombia) Alberto Rivadeneira (2)	275	−13			Los Arrayanes
1977		(United States) Phil Hancock	272	−16			El Rodeo Macarena
1976		(Colombia) Rogelio González (4)	283	−5			Los Lagartos
1975		(England) Peter Butler	291	+3			Lagos de Cuajaral
1974		(Colombia) Heraclio Valenzuela	279				Club Campestre de Pereira
1973		(Colombia) Alfonso Bohórquez	274				Carmel Club
1972		(Colombia) Diego Correa (a)	281				El Rodeo
1971		(United States) Bert Greene	274				Country Club de Bogotá
1970		(Colombia) Alberto Rivadeneira	288				Club Campestre de Cali
1969		(Colombia) Rogelio González (3)	281				San Andrés
1968		(Colombia) Rogelio González (2)	283				Club Campestre de Bucaramanga
1967		(Colombia) Rogelio González	285				Country Club de Bogotá
1966		(Colombia) Pedro P. García	295				Barranquilla
1964–65: No tournament
1963		(United States) Chi-Chi Rodríguez	287				Barranquilla
1962		(Colombia) Miguel Sala (2)	280				El Rodeo
1961		(Argentina) Roberto De Vicenzo	277				El Rodeo
1960		(United States) Bob Watson	285				Club Campestre de Cali
1959		(United States) Pete Cooper	283				Club Campestre de Cali
1958		(Argentina) Leopoldo Ruiz	287				Country Club de Bogotá
1957		(United States) Doug Sanders	269				San Andrés
1956		(United States) Arnold Palmer	280				Club Campestre de Cali
1955		(Argentina) Esteban Sorolla	284				Los Lagartos
1954		(Argentina) Pablo Molina	286				Los Lagartos
1953		(Colombia) Miguel Sala	287				Country Club de Bogotá
1952		(United States) Al Besselink	281				Country Club de Bogotá
1951		(Colombia) Raúl Posse (3)	286				Club Campestre de Cali
1950		(Colombia) Raúl Posse (2)	296				Barranquilla
1949		(Argentina) Alberto Serra	301				San Andrés
1948		(Argentina) Pedro Valdi (2)	275				Medellín
1947		(Argentina) Pedro Valdi	282				Country Club de Bogotá
1946		(Colombia) Raúl Posse	284				Club Campestre de Cali
1945		(Argentina) Guillermo Felice	397				Country Club de Bogotá

== See also ==
- Open golf tournament
