= Michael Buttacavoli =

American professional golfer (born 1988)

Personal information
- Full name: Michael Anthony Buttacavoli
- Nationality: United States
- Born: March 26, 1988 (age 38) Miami Beach, Florida, U.S.
- Height: 5 ft 9 in (1.75 m)
- Weight: 155 lb (70 kg; 11.1 st)

Career
- Sport: Golf
- College: Rice University
- Turned professional: 2010
- Former tours: Web.com Tour; PGA Tour Latinoamérica; NGA Pro Golf Tour
- Professional wins: 4

Michael Anthony Buttacavoli (born March 26, 1988) is an American professional golfer who played on Web.com Tour, PGA Tour Latinoamérica, and NGA Pro Golf Tour.

== Amateur career ==
Prior to turning professional, Buttacavoli represented the Rice Owls at college and was their leading golfer during the 2009–10 season.

== Professional career ==
Buttacavoli turned professional in 2010 and played on the NGA Pro Golf Tour in 2011 and 2012 seasons before gaining membership to PGA Tour Latinoamérica for the 2013 season.

In 2013, Buttacavoli managed two top-10 finishes on PGA Tour Latinoamérica, eventually finishing 30th in the Order of Merit and retaining his playing rights for the 2014 season.

In May 2014, Buttcavoli recorded his first professional win at the Dominican Republic Open after overcoming a six stroke deficit on the final seven holes and winning a three-hole playoff.

== Professional wins (4) ==
=== PGA Tour Latinoamérica wins (4) ===
No.	Date	Tournament	Winning score	Margin of victory	Runner-up
1	May 18, 2014	Dominican Republic Open	−12 (66-70-73-67=276)	Playoff	(United States) Rick Cochran III
2	Sep 3, 2017	Flor de Caña Open	−20 (69-62-64-69=264)	Playoff	(United States) Michael Davan
3	May 6, 2018	BMW Jamaica Classic	−21 (65-68-62=195) (Note: Shortened to 54 holes due to weather.)	3 strokes	(United States) Tyson Alexander, (United States) Harry Higgs
4	Dec 2, 2018	Shell Championship	−18 (66-65-72-67=270)	1 stroke	(United States) Evan Harmeling
