= Sebastián Salem =

Peruvian professional golfer (born 1983)

Personal information
- Nationality: Peru
- Born: 8 March 1983 (age 43) Lima, Perú
- Height: 5 ft 10 in (1.78 m)
- Weight: 167 lb (76 kg; 11.9 st)

Career
- Sport: Golf
- Turned professional: 2006
- Former tour: PGA Tour Latinoamérica
- Professional wins: 1

Sebastián Salem (born 8 March 1983) is a Peruvian professional golfer who formerly played on PGA Tour Latinoamérica.

== Professional career ==
Salem has played sporadically on PGA Tour Latinoamérica since 2012 and achieved his only professional win to date at the 2012 Lexus Peru Open on the tour.

== Professional wins (1) ==
=== PGA Tour Latinoamérica wins (1) ===
No.	Date	Tournament	Winning score	Margin of victory	Runners-up
1	4 Nov 2012	Lexus Peru Open	−13 (71-71-66-66=275)	1 stroke	(Argentina) Clodomiro Carranza, (Colombia) Andrés Echavarría, (Paraguay) Carlos Franco, (Argentina) Maximiliano Godoy
