= Golf at the 2011 Summer Universiade =

Coordinates: 22°47′9″N 114°0′25″E

Golf was contested at the 2011 Summer Universiade from 17–20 August at the Mission Hills Golf Club in Shenzhen, China. Men's and women's individual and team events were held.

== Medal summary ==
=== Medal table ===
Rank	Nation	Gold	Silver	Bronze	Total
1	Japan (JPN)	2	1	0	3
2	Chinese Taipei (TPE)	2	0	0	2
3	Italy (ITA)	0	1	1	2
4	China (CHN)	0	1	0	1
4	Czech Republic (CZE)	0	1	0	1
6	Mexico (MEX)	0	0	1	1
6	South Korea (KOR)	0	0	1	1
6	United States (USA)	0	0	1	1
Totals (8 entries)		4	4	4	12

=== Events ===
Event	Gold	Silver	Bronze
Men's singles	Hideki Matsuyama; Japan	Yoshinori Fujimoto; Japan	Andrea Bolognesi; Italy
Women's singles	Lin Tzuchi; Chinese Taipei	Katerina Ruzickova; Czech Republic	Ko Min Jeong; South Korea
Men's team	Japan; Yoshinori Fujimoto; Hideto Kobukuro; Hideki Matsuyama; Shinji Tomimura	Italy; Andrea Bolognesi; Leonardo Motta; Niccolo Quintarelli; Lorenzo Scotto	Mexico; Mauricio Azcué; Rodolfo Cazaubón; Carlos Ortiz; Gerardo Ruiz de la Concha
Women's team	Chinese Taipei; Lin Tzuchi; Liu Yi-chen; Yao Hsuan-yu	China; Li Jiayun; Xu Yue; Zhang Yuyang	United States; Brooke Beeler; Catherine O'Donnell; Caroline Powers
