= 2011 Canadian Tour =

Golf tour season

2011 Canadian Tour season
- Duration: March 17, 2011 – November 6, 2011
- Number of official events: 12
- Most wins: (Mexico) José de Jesús Rodríguez (2)
- Order of Merit: (Mexico) José de Jesús Rodríguez

The 2011 Canadian Tour was the 26th season of the Canadian Tour, the main professional golf tour in Canada since it was formed in 1986.

== Schedule ==
The following table lists official events during the 2011 season.

Date	Tournament	Location	Purse (C$)	Winner (Note: The number in parentheses after each winner's name is the number of Canadian Tour events they had won up to and including that tournament.)	OWGR points	Other tours (Note: TLA − Tour de las Américas.)
Mar 20	Pacific Colombia Tour Barranquilla	Colombia	US$100,000	(United States) Cody Slover (1)	6	TLA
Mar 27	Pacific Colombia Tour Championship	Colombia	US$130,000	(Canada) Adam Hadwin (2)	6	TLA
May 8	Mexican PGA Championship	Mexico	US$125,000	(Mexico) José de Jesús Rodríguez (1)	6	
Jun 5	Times Colonist Island Savings Open	British Columbia	200,000	(Mexico) José de Jesús Rodríguez (2)	6	
Jun 12	Western Championship	British Columbia	125,000	(Canada) Roger Sloan (1)	6	
Jun 26	Syncrude Boreal Open	Alberta	150,000	(Canada) Danny Sahl (1)	6	
Jul 3	ATB Financial Classic	Alberta	200,000	(Chile) Hugo León (1)	6	
Jul 10	Dakota Dunes Casino Open	Saskatchewan	200,000	(United States) Joe Panzeri (1)	6	
Jul 17	Canadian Tour Players Cup	Manitoba	200,000	(United States) Tom Hoge (1)	6	
Aug 21	Seaforth Country Classic	Ontario	100,000	(United States) Brian Unk (3)	6	
Aug 28	Canadian Tour Championship	Ontario	200,000	(Canada) Stuart Anderson (4)	6	
Nov 6	Desert Dunes Classic	United States	150,000	(United States) Byron Smith (4)	6	

== Order of Merit ==
The Order of Merit was based on prize money won during the season, calculated in Canadian dollars.

Position	Player	Prize money (C$)
1	(Mexico) José de Jesús Rodríguez	80,228
2	(Chile) Hugo León	66,994
3	(Chile) Benjamín Alvarado	57,691
4	(Canada) Stuart Anderson	54,470
5	(Canada) Roger Sloan	49,788
