= Yoshinori Fujimoto =

Japanese professional golfer

Personal information
- Nationality: Japan
- Born: 25 October 1989 (age 37) Yamatokoriyama, Nara Prefecture, Japan
- Height: 1.65 m (5 ft 5 in)
- Weight: 68 kg (150 lb; 10.7 st)

Career
- Sport: Golf
- Turned professional: 2012
- Current tour: Japan Golf Tour
- Professional wins: 4
- Highest ranking: 92 (10 January 2016)

Number of wins by tour
- Japan Golf Tour: 4

Best results in major championships
- Masters Tournament: DNP
- PGA Championship: DNP
- U.S. Open: DNP
- The Open Championship: T54: 2012

Achievements and awards
- Japan Golf Tour Rookie of the Year: 2012
Medal record
Summer Universiade
Gold medal – first place	2011 Shenzhen	Men's team
Silver medal – second place	2011 Shenzhen	Individual

Yoshinori Fujimoto (born 25 October 1989) is a Japanese professional golfer.

== Career ==
As an amateur, Fujimoto won the individual silver medal at the 2011 Summer Universiade and led the Japan team to the gold medal.

Fujimoto turned professional in 2012 and joined the Japan Golf Tour. He won his first title in June 2012 at the Japan Golf Tour Championship Citibank Cup Shishido Hills, which qualified him for the 2012 Open Championship. Yoshinori was also named the 2012 Rookie of the Year. He won again the next season at the 2013 Toshin Golf Tournament.

Fujimoto was sponsored by ISPS for several years, but is now sponsored by Honma Golf.

In January 2019, Fujimoto qualified for the 2019 Open Championship with a runner-up finish at the SMBC Singapore Open. It was his second career appearance at the Open.

== Professional wins (4) ==
=== Japan Golf Tour wins (4) ===
Legend
Japan majors (1)
Other Japan Golf Tour (3)

No.	Date	Tournament	Winning score	Margin of victory	Runner(s)-up
1	3 Jun 2012	Japan Golf Tour Championship Citibank Cup Shishido Hills	−13 (68-68-67-68=271)	2 strokes	(Japan) Masamichi Uehira
2	13 Oct 2013	Toshin Golf Tournament	−24 (63-64-70-67=264)	4 strokes	(Japan) Koumei Oda
3	17 May 2026	Kansai Open Golf Championship	−9 (69-68-69-65=271)	3 strokes	(Japan) Takanori Kinoshi, (Japan) Yujiro Ohori
4	25 Oct 2026	Fortinet Players Cup	−15 (66-68-69-66=269)	4 strokes	(Japan) Shugo Imahira, (Japan) Ryosuke Kinoshita, (Japan) Kosuke Sunagawa, (Japan) Kosei Takeyama

Japan Golf Tour playoff record (0–1)

No.	Year	Tournament	Opponent	Result
1	2018	Japan PGA Championship	(Japan) Toru Taniguchi	Lost to birdie on first extra hole

== Results in major championships ==
Tournament	2012	2013	2014	2015	2016	2017	2018
Masters Tournament							
U.S. Open							
The Open Championship	T54						
PGA Championship							

Tournament	2019
Masters Tournament	
PGA Championship	
U.S. Open	
The Open Championship	CUT

Did not play

CUT = missed the half-way cut
"T" = tied

== Results in World Golf Championships ==
Tournament	2012
Match Play	
Championship	
Invitational	T60
Champions	

Did not play

"T" = Tied

== Team appearances ==
- Royal Trophy (representing Asia): 2012 (winners)
