= Stella Artois Open =

Men's professional golf tournament

Tournament information
- Location: Antigua, Guatemala
- Established: 2014
- Courses: La Reunion Golf Resort (Fuego Maya Golf Course)
- Par: 72
- Length: 7,282 yards (6,659 m)
- Tour: PGA Tour Latinoamérica
- Format: Stroke play
- Prize fund: US$175,000
- Month played: March
- Final year: 2018

Tournament record score
- Aggregate: 268 Ben Polland (2018)
- To par: −20 as above

Final champion
- (United States) Ben Polland
- Location in Guatemala

The Stella Artois Open was a men's professional golf tournament on PGA Tour Latinoamérica played on the Fuego Maya Golf Course at La Reunion Golf Resort in Antigua, Guatemala. The tournament was first played in 2014 as one of the new events introduced as part of an expansion of PGA Tour Latinoamérica to 16 events for the 2014 season. The inaugural winner of the event was Armando Favela

== Winners ==
Year	Winner	Score	To par	Margin of victory	Runner(s)-up
Guatemala Stella Artois Open
2018	(United States) Ben Polland	268	−20	4 strokes	(United States) Skyler Finnell (United States) Matt Gilchrest
2017	(Chile) Cristián Espinoza	62 (Note: Shortened to 18 holes due to weather. Due to the event's length, this win is not officially recognized as a PGA Tour Latinoamérica victory.)	−10	3 strokes	(United States) Danny Balin
2016	(United States) John Young Kim	273	−15	2 strokes	(Canada) Corey Conners (Argentina) Emilio Domínguez
2015	(United States) Danny Balin	201 (Note: Shortened to 54 holes due to weather.)	−15	4 strokes	(United States) Eric Dugas
Stella Artois Open
2014	(Mexico) Armando Favela	274	−14	1 stroke	(Argentina) Nelson Ledesma
