= Mazatlán Open =

Tournament information
- Location: Mazatlán, Mexico
- Established: 2014
- Course: Estrella del Mar Golf
- Par: 72
- Length: 7,045 yards (6,442 m)
- Tour: PGA Tour Latinoamérica
- Format: Stroke play
- Prize fund: US$175,000
- Month played: May
- Final year: 2016

Tournament record score
- Aggregate: 271 Tommy Cocha (2015)
- To par: −17 as above

Final champion
- (United States) Martin Trainer
- Location in Mexico Location in Sinaloa

The Mazatlán Open was a men's professional golf tournament held at Mazatlán, Sinaloa, Mexico as part of PGA Tour Latinoamérica. The tournament was first held in 2014 and the inaugural winner was Tyler McCumber.

== Winners ==
Year	Winner	Score	To par	Margin of victory	Runner(s)-up	Ref.
Mazatlán Open
2016	(United States) Martin Trainer	273	−15	1 stroke	(Argentina) Leandro Marelli	
2015	(Argentina) Tommy Cocha	271	−17	2 strokes	(Colombia) Óscar David Álvarez (Colombia) Andrés Echavarría	
TransAmerican Power Products CRV Mazatlán Open
2014	(United States) Tyler McCumber	278	−10	Playoff	(Argentina) Jorge Fernández-Valdés	
