= 2018 PGA Tour Canada =

Golf tour season

2018 PGA Tour Canada season
- Duration: May 31, 2018 – September 16, 2018
- Number of official events: 12 (Note: One further tournament was scheduled but was cancelled.)
- Most wins: (United States) Tyler McCumber (3)
- Order of Merit: (United States) Tyler McCumber

The 2018 PGA Tour Canada, titled as the 2018 Mackenzie Tour-PGA Tour Canada for sponsorship reasons, was the 33rd season of the Canadian Tour, and the sixth under the operation and running of the PGA Tour.

== Schedule ==
The following table lists official events during the 2018 season.

Date	Tournament	Location	Purse (C$)	Winner (Note: The number in parentheses after each winner's name is the number of PGA Tour Canada events they had won up to and including that tournament. It is rare for someone to accumulate many wins on PGA Tour Canada as success at this level usually leads to promotion to the Web.com Tour.)	OWGR points
Jun 3	Freedom 55 Financial Open	British Columbia	200,000	(United States) Jordan Niebrugge (1)	7
Jun 10	Bayview Place DCBank Open	British Columbia	200,000	(United States) Sam Fidone (1)	6
Jun 17	GolfBC Championship	British Columbia	200,000	(United States) George Cunningham (1)	6
Jun 24	Lethbridge Paradise Canyon Open	Alberta	200,000	(United States) T. T. Crouch (1)	6
Jul 8	Windsor Championship	Ontario	200,000	(United States) Mark Anguiano (1)	6
Jul 15	Staal Foundation Open	Ontario	200,000	(United States) Ben Griffin (1)	6
Jul 22	Osprey Valley Open	Ontario	200,000	(United States) Tyler McCumber (1)	6
Aug 5	Syncrude Oil Country Championship	Alberta	200,000	(United States) Tyler McCumber (2)	6
Aug 12	ATB Financial Classic	Alberta	200,000	(United States) Corey Pereira (1)	6
Aug 19	The Players Cup	Manitoba	200,000	(United States) Tyler McCumber (3)	6
~~Sep 2~~	Cape Breton Open	Nova Scotia	–	Cancelled	–
Sep 9	Mackenzie Investments Open	Quebec	200,000	(United States) Blake Olson (1)	6
Sep 16	Freedom 55 Financial Championship	Ontario	225,000	(United States) Danny Walker (1)	6

=== Unofficial events ===
The following events were sanctioned by the PGA Tour Canada, but did not carry official money, nor were wins official.

Date	Tournament	Location	Purse (C$)	Winner	OWGR points
Dec 15	Go Vacaciones Cozumel Cup	Mexico	US$120,000	PGA Tour Latinoamérica	n/a

== Order of Merit ==
The Order of Merit was based on prize money won during the season, calculated in Canadian dollars. The top five players on the Order of Merit earned status to play on the 2019 Korn Ferry Tour.

Position	Player	Prize money (C$)
1	(United States) Tyler McCumber	139,300
2	(United States) George Cunningham	102,167
3	(United States) Zach Wright	88,605
4	(United States) Corey Pereira	83,903
5	(United States) Michael Gellerman	68,649

== See also ==
- 2018 PGA Tour China
- 2018 PGA Tour Latinoamérica
