= Flor de Caña Open =

Tournament information
- Location: Tola, Nicaragua
- Established: 2016
- Courses: Mukul Beach Golf and Spa
- Par: 71
- Length: 6,664 yards (6,094 m)
- Tour: PGA Tour Latinoamérica
- Format: Stroke play
- Prize fund: US$175,000
- Month played: August/September
- Final year: 2017

Tournament record score
- Aggregate: 259 Augusto Núñez (2016)
- To par: −25 as above

Final champion
- (United States) Michael Buttacavoli
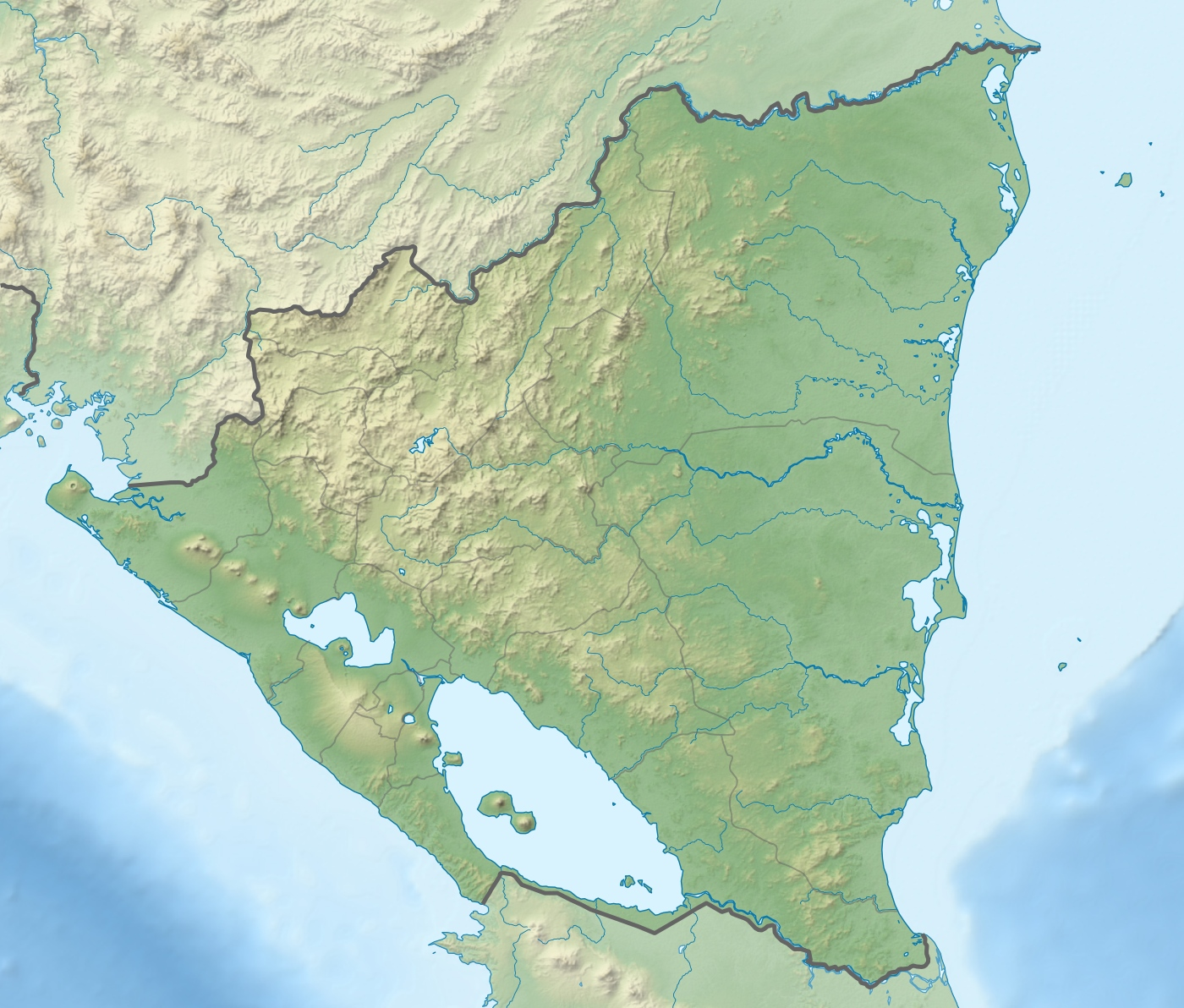
- Location in Nicaragua

Flor de Caña Open was a golf tournament on the PGA Tour Latinoamérica that was played in 2016 and 2017. The tournament was sponsored by the Nicaraguan rum brand Flor de Caña and became the first professional golf tournament on the PGA Tour Latinoamérica to be played in Nicaragua. The inaugural tournament was won by Argentine Augusto Núñez.

== History ==
The first Flor de Caña Open was announced in April 2016. The inaugural event was held at Mukul Beach Golf and Spa at Guacalito de la Isla and became the first PGA Tour Latinoamérica tournament to be played in Nicaragua. The 2016 tournament was won by Argentine Augusto Núñez. It was his first win on the tour and put him into 1st place in the tour standings.

Michael Buttacavoli defeated Michael Davan in 2017 after a 10-hole playoff, the longest playoff in the history of PGA Tour Latinoamérica.

== Winners ==
| Year | Winner | Score | To par | Margin of victory | Runner(s)-up | Ref. |
|---|---|---|---|---|---|---|
| 2017 | (United States) Michael Buttacavoli | 264 | −20 | Playoff | (United States) Michael Davan | |
| 2016 | (Argentina) Augusto Núñez | 259 | −25 | 1 stroke | (Argentina) Emilio Domínguez (United States) Eric Steger | |
