= Honduras Open =

Tournament information
- Location: Tela, Honduras
- Established: 2015
- Courses: Indura Beach and Golf Resort
- Par: 72
- Tour: PGA Tour Latinoamérica
- Format: Stroke play
- Prize fund: US$175,000
- Month played: March
- Final year: 2017

Tournament record score
- Aggregate: 267 Felipe Velázquez (2015)
- To par: −21 as above

Final champion
- (United States) Patrick Newcomb

Location map
- Location in Honduras

The Honduras Open was a golf tournament on the PGA Tour Latinoamérica between 2015 and 2017. The tournament was first played in 2015 with the inaugural winner being Venezuelan Felipe Velázquez.

== Winners ==
Year	Winner	Score	To par	Margin of victory	Runner-up	Ref.
2017	(United States) Patrick Newcomb	271	−17	Playoff	(United States) Hank Lebioda	
2016	(United States) Sam Fidone	272	−16	1 stroke	(United States) Seth Fair	
2015	(Venezuela) Felipe Velázquez	267	−21	2 strokes	(Australia) Brady Watt	

== See also ==
- Open golf tournament
