= Jesús Amaya =

Colombian professional golfer

Personal information
- Full name: Jesús Armando Amaya Contreras
- Nickname: Estrellita
- Nationality: Colombia
- Born: 24 August 1969 (age 57) Bogotá, Colombia
- Height: 1.66 m (5 ft 5 in)
- Spouse: Alexa Manrique
- Children: 2

Career
- Sport: Golf
- Turned professional: 1991
- Former tours: Tour de las Américas; Colombian Tour
- Professional wins: 47

Jesús Armando Amaya Contreras (born 24 August 1969) is a Colombian professional golfer.

== Early life ==
Amaya was born in Bogotá. He worked as a caddie at the Club Popular de Golf La Florida.

== Professional career ==
In 1991, he turned professional. In addition to his many victories on the Colombian Golf Federation circuit, including three Colombian Open titles, Amaya has won six times on the Tour de las Américas, finishing second on the Order of Merit in 2000–01, and fourth in 2001–02. In 2015, he won his 100th tournament.

Amaya has represented Colombia on five occasions at the World Cup.

== Professional wins (47) ==
=== Tour de las Américas wins (7) ===
No.	Date	Tournament	Winning score	Margin of victory	Runner(s)-up
1	12 Nov 2000	Abierto del Litoral	−10 (69-65=134) (Note: Shortened to 36 holes due to weather.)	Playoff	(Argentina) Gustavo Rojas
2	26 Nov 2000	Chevrolet Brazil Open	−6 (274)	Playoff	(United States) Shannon Sykora
3	10 Nov 2002	Abierto de Medellín	−8 (68-70-71-71=280)	Playoff	(Argentina) Marcelo Soria
4	17 Nov 2002	Serrezuela Masters	−13 (68-68-69-70=275)	2 strokes	(Colombia) Rodrigo Castaneda, (Argentina) Gustavo Mendoza
5	24 Nov 2002	CANTV Venezuela Open	−14 (64-67-66-69=266)	4 strokes	(Paraguay) Raúl Fretes
6	6 May 2007	Canal i Abierto de Venezuela (2)	−12 (68-67-64-69=268)	3 strokes	(Argentina) Fabián Gómez, (Argentina) Sebastián Saavedra
7	18 Jul 2010	Abierto Internacional de Golf Copa Sura	−22 (68-67-65-66=266)	4 strokes	(Colombia) Álvaro Arizabaleta, (Argentina) César Costilla

=== Colombian Tour wins (8) ===
No.	Date	Tournament	Winning score	Margin of victory	Runner(s)-up
1	25 Aug 2013	Abierto de Golf Club Campestre de Medellín	−6 (66-75-69-72=282)	1 stroke	(Colombia) David Vanegas, (Colombia) Diego Velásquez
2	16 Mar 2014	Abierto de Golf Club Campestre de Cali	−10 (69-68-69-68=274)	1 stroke	(Colombia) Manuel José Merizalde
3	1 Mar 2015	Abierto del Carmel Club	−8 (68-69-69-66=272)	3 strokes	(Colombia) Diego Velásquez
4	19 Apr 2015	Copa Ciudad de Barranquilla	−7 (71-70-73-67=281)	1 stroke	(Colombia) Ricardo Salazar
5	15 Jun 2015	Abierto Copa Pueblo Viejo	−10 (71-65-69-73=278)	2 strokes	(Colombia) Diego Vanegas
6	22 May 2016	Abierto Opita de Golf	−22 (71-65-65-65=266)	8 strokes	(Colombia) Álvaro Pinedo
7	10 Sep 2016	Abierto de El Rancho	+1 (69-70-71-71=281)	2 strokes	(Colombia) Manuel José Merizalde
8	1 Aug 2021	Abierto de Colombia	−10 (71-71-68-67=278)	2 strokes	(Colombia) David Vanegas

=== Other Colombian wins (30) ===
This list is incomplete

- 1993 Colombian Open, Campeonato Nacional de Profesionales, CC Medellín Open
- 1994 Caribbean Open (Barranquilla)
- 2003 Los Andes GC Open, Pereira Open
- 2004 Barranquilla Open, Colombian Open, Petrolero Open, CC Cali Open, CC Guaymaral Tournament (with Gustavo Mendoza)
- 2005 Serrezuela Open, Pueblo Viejo CC Open, Farallones Open, CC Medellín Open, Colombian Open, Caribbean Open (Barranquilla), GC Peñalisa Open, Carmel Club Open
- 2006 CC Armenia Open, Manizales Open, Serrezuela Open, Colombian National Championship, GC Peñalisa Open
- 2007 CC Cali Open
- 2008 CC La Sabana Open, CC El Rancho Open, Carmel Club Open
- 2010 Medellín Open
- 2012 Caribbean Open

=== Other wins (2) ===
- 2010 Dominican Republic Open
- 2015 Chiapas Golf Challenge (Mexico)

== Team appearances ==
- World Cup (representing Colombia): 1995, 1997, 1999, 2000, 2002
