= Nate Lashley =

American professional golfer (born 1982)

Personal information
- Full name: Nathan Clark Lashley
- Nationality: United States
- Born: December 12, 1982 (age 43) Scottsbluff, Nebraska, U.S.
- Height: 6 ft 1 in (1.85 m)
- Weight: 190 lb (86 kg; 14 st)

Career
- Sport: Golf
- College: University of Arizona
- Turned professional: 2005
- Current tour: PGA Tour
- Former tours: Web.com Tour; PGA Tour Latinoamérica; Gateway Tour
- Professional wins: 15
- Highest ranking: 70 (February 2, 2020) (as of October 25, 2026)

Number of wins by tour
- PGA Tour: 1
- Korn Ferry Tour: 1
- Other: 13

Best results in major championships
- Masters Tournament: CUT: 2020
- PGA Championship: T37: 2020
- U.S. Open: T28: 2019
- The Open Championship: CUT: 2019

Achievements and awards
- PGA Tour Latinoamérica Order of Merit winner: 2016

Nathan Clark Lashley (born December 12, 1982) is an American professional golfer who plays on the PGA Tour.

== Early life ==
Lashley was born in Scottsbluff, Nebraska. He played college golf at the University of Arizona. During his junior year, his parents and girlfriend died in a plane crash in Wyoming while flying from Sunriver, Oregon, where they had watched Lashley compete in the NCAA West Regional, to Nebraska.

== Professional career ==
Lashley turned professional after graduating in 2005. He played on the Nationwide Tour (now Korn Ferry Tour) in 2006 but made only two cuts in 14 events. He spent the next several years playing mini-tours and selling real estate before qualifying for the PGA Tour Latinoamérica in 2015. He finished 8th on the money list in 2015 with five top-10 finishes. In 2016, he won three events, led the money list and won the Player of the Year award. His placement on the money list earned him a Web.com Tour card for 2017.

On the Web.com Tour in 2017, Lashley won the Corales Puntacana Resort and Club Championship and finished 11th on the money list to earn his PGA Tour card for 2018. In 2018, he made eight cuts in 17 events before a knee injury ended his season. He started the 2019 PGA Tour on a minor medical extension, but did not fully meet the terms and spent that part of the season playing out of the 126-150 category.

In June 2019, Lashley earned his first PGA Tour win at the 2019 Rocket Mortgage Classic. Lashley failed to Monday qualify for the event, but gained entry as the third alternate and final man in the field. He was ranked 353rd in the world at the start of the week. He shot 63-67-63-70 to win by six strokes and earned $1,314,000 with the wire-to-wire victory. In addition, his PGA Tour card was now good until the end of the 2021–22 season and he was invited to play in the 2019 Open Championship, The Players Championship, Masters Tournament and the Sentry Tournament of Champions in 2020. The win moved him to 101st in the Official World Golf Ranking.

== Professional wins (15) ==
=== PGA Tour wins (1) ===
| No. | Date | Tournament | Winning score | Margin of victory | Runner-up |
|---|---|---|---|---|---|
| 1 | Jun 30, 2019 | Rocket Mortgage Classic | −25 (63-67-63-70=263) | 6 strokes | (United States) Doc Redman |

=== Web.com Tour wins (1) ===
| No. | Date | Tournament | Winning score | Margin of victory | Runner-up |
|---|---|---|---|---|---|
| 1 | May 7, 2017 | Corales Puntacana Resort and Club Championship | −20 (70-65-67-66=268) | 1 stroke | (Argentina) Augusto Núñez |

=== PGA Tour Latinoamérica wins (3) ===
| No. | Date | Tournament | Winning score | Margin of victory | Runner(s)-up |
|---|---|---|---|---|---|
| 1 | Sep 11, 2016 | San Luis Championship | −7 (69-70-72-70=281) | Playoff | (Colombia) Andrés Echavarría, (United States) Robert Rohanna, (Colombia) Daniel Vanegas |
| 2 | Sep 18, 2016 | Copa Diners Club International | −15 (68-67-67-67=269) | 2 strokes | (United States) Case Cochran, (Australia) Ryan Ruffels |
| 3 | Dec 4, 2016 | Shell Championship | −19 (69-64-65-67=265) | 10 strokes | (Argentina) Augusto Núñez |

=== Gateway Tour wins (4) ===
| No. | Date | Tournament | Winning score | Margin of victory | Runner(s)-up |
|---|---|---|---|---|---|
| 1 | Jun 27, 2008 | Desert Summer 4 | −14 (67-67-68=202) | 2 strokes | (Mexico) Óscar Fraustro |
| 2 | Jun 19, 2009 | Desert Summer 3 | −15 (67-67-67=201) | Playoff | (United States) Chris Kamin, (Australia) Jake Younan-Wise |
| 3 | Mar 10, 2011 | Arizona Series 7 | −20 (60-70-66=196) | 1 stroke | (United States) Jason Allred |
| 4 | May 13, 2011 | Arizona Series 14 | −12 (66-68-67=201) | 1 stroke | (United States) James Drew |

=== Other wins (6) ===
- 2009 Utah Open
- 2010 Waterloo Open Golf Classic, Colorado Open, Wyoming Open
- 2011 Waterloo Open Golf Classic
- 2015 Utah Open

== Results in major championships ==
Results not in chronological order in 2020.

| Tournament | 2019 | 2020 |
|---|---|---|
| Masters Tournament | | CUT |
| PGA Championship | | T37 |
| U.S. Open | T28 | |
| The Open Championship | CUT | NT |

Did not play

CUT = missed the half-way cut
"T" indicates a tie for place
NT = No tournament due to COVID-19 pandemic

== Results in The Players Championship ==
| Tournament | 2021 | 2022 | 2023 | 2024 | 2025 |
|---|---|---|---|---|---|
| The Players Championship | 71 | | T60 | T13 | CUT |

Did not play

"T" indicates a tie for a place

== Results in World Golf Championships ==
| Tournament | 2019 |
|---|---|
| Championship | |
| Match Play | |
| Invitational | T20 |
| Champions | |

Did not play

"T" = Tied

== Team appearances ==
- Aruba Cup (representing PGA Tour Latinoamérica): 2016 (winners)

== See also ==
- 2017 Web.com Tour Finals graduates
