= Rodolfo Cazaubón =

Mexican professional golfer (born 1989)

Personal information
- Full name: Rodolfo Cazaubón Jr.
- Nationality: Mexico
- Born: 5 August 1989 (age 37) Tampico, Tamaulipas, Mexico
- Height: 5 ft 10 in (178 cm)
- Weight: 150 lb (68 kg)

Career
- Sport: Golf
- College: University of North Texas
- Turned professional: 2013
- Current tour: PGA Tour Latinoamérica
- Former tour: Web.com Tour
- Professional wins: 6

Achievements and awards
- PGA Tour Latinoamérica Order of Merit winner: 2015
Medal record
Summer Universiade
| Bronze medal – third place | 2011 Shenzhen | Men's team |

Rodolfo Cazaubón Jr. (born 5 August 1989) is a Mexican professional golfer who currently plays on the Web.com Tour.

== Amateur career ==
Cazaubón played college golf at the University of North Texas where he won three tournaments in his senior year and was an All-American in 2013. He played on the Mexican team in the 2010 and 2012 Eisenhower Trophy. The 2012 team finished second to the United States by five strokes. He also played on the Mexican team in the 2011 World University Games, helping the team to a bronze medal.

== Professional career ==
Cazaubón turned professional in 2013 and largely played on PGA Tour Latinoamérica during the 2014 season. His best result during his inaugural season as a professional was a second place at the 2014 Mundo Maya Open.

During the 2015 PGA Tour Latinoamérica season, Cazaubón won his first Official World Golf Ranking points event at the Lexus Panama Classic. He followed this up with his second win on the tour at the Dominican Republic Open in June 2015. Cazaubón earned his third win of the season at the Lexus Peru Open and finished 2015 leading the Tour's Order of Merit, making him fully exempt for the 2016 Web.com Tour. He represented Mexico in Rio 2016 Olympic games

== Professional wins (6) ==
=== PGA Tour Latinoamérica wins (4) ===
| No. | Date | Tournament | Winning score | Margin of victory | Runner(s)-up |
|---|---|---|---|---|---|
| 1 | 3 May 2015 | Lexus Panama Classic | −12 (67-67-74-69=276) | 2 strokes | (Spain) Samuel Del Val, (United States) Ethan Tracy |
| 2 | 7 Jun 2015 | Dominican Republic Open | −10 (70-69-67-72=278) | 3 strokes | (Colombia) Santiago Rivas, (Brazil) Alexandre Rocha |
| 3 | 22 Nov 2015 | Lexus Peru Open | −20 (64-67-67-70=268) | Playoff | (United States) Kent Bulle |
| 4 | 15 Oct 2017 | Aberto do Brasil | −17 (69-64-69-65=267) | 6 strokes | (Mexico) Óscar Fraustro, (Mexico) José de Jesús Rodríguez |

=== Gira de Golf Profesional Mexicana wins (2) ===
| No. | Date | Tournament | Winning score | Margin of victory | Runner-up |
|---|---|---|---|---|---|
| 1 | 25 Feb 2018 | Copa Tequila Azulejos | −8 (67-71-70=208) | 1 stroke | (Mexico) Gerardo Ruiz |
| 2 | 17 Jan 2021 (2019–20 season) | Copa Puro Sinaloa | −20 (66-68-66-68=268) | Playoff | (Colombia) Camilo Aguado |

== Team appearances ==
Amateur

- Eisenhower Trophy (representing Mexico): 2010, 2012

Professional

- Aruba Cup (representing PGA Tour Latinoamérica): 2017
