= Manuel Villegas (golfer) =

Colombian professional golfer (born 1984)

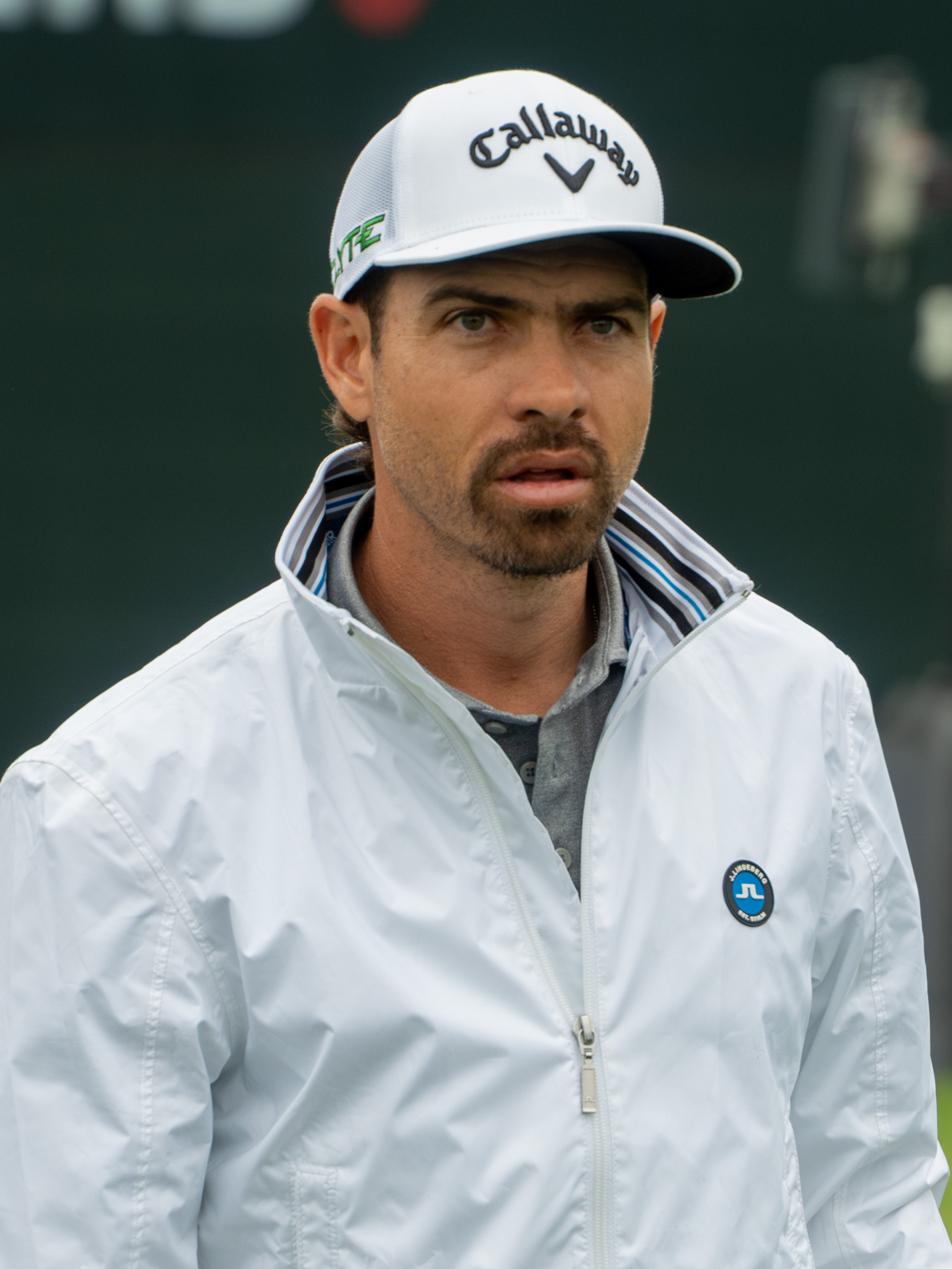
- Villegas in 2025

Personal information
- Full name: Manuel Villegas Restrepo
- Nationality: Colombia
- Born: 3 December 1984 (age 41) Medellín, Colombia
- Height: 5 ft 9 in (1.75 m)
- Weight: 159 lb (72 kg; 11.4 st)

Career
- Sport: Golf
- College: University of Florida
- Turned professional: 2008
- Current tours: Web.com Tour; PGA Tour Latinoamérica
- Former tour: NGA Pro Golf Tour
- Professional wins: 5

Manuel Villegas Restrepo (born 3 December 1984) is a Colombian professional golfer who currently plays on the Korn Ferry Tour and PGA Tour Latinoamérica. He is also the brother of PGA Tour player Camilo Villegas.

== Professional career ==
After graduating from the University of Florida in 2007, Villegas turned professional in 2008 and marked his professional debut with a win at the 2008 Colombian Open.

In 2009 Villegas played a number of events in South America including one win at the Máster Profesional on the Colombian golf tour.

in 2010 Villegas played a number of events on the Web.com Tour and the Hooters Tour (now called the NGA Pro Golf Tour) making his only win of the season at the Woodcreek Classic on the Hooters Tour.

Villegas went on to represent Colombia with his brother Camilo at the 2011 Omega Mission Hills World Cup in China. However, in 2012 his career suffered a setback when he fractured his right hand, forcing him to play a reduced schedule on the first season of PGA Tour Latinoamérica.

Following the injury setback, Villegas was able to return to form in 2013, achieving his first win on PGA Tour Latinoamérica at the 2013 TransAmerican Power Products CRV Open in Mexico. This win along with a further two top-3 finishes on PGA Tour Latinoamérica helped Villegas to a 5th-place finish on the PGA Tour Latinoamérica Order of Merit for 2013, an achievement which earned him playing rights on the Web.com Tour for the 2014 season.

== Professional wins (5) ==
=== PGA Tour Latinoamérica wins (1) ===
No.	Date	Tournament	Winning score	Margin of victory	Runner-up
1	24 Mar 2013	TransAmerican Power Products CRV Open	−8 (66-69-74-67=276)	1 stroke	(Mexico) José de Jesús Rodríguez

=== Colombian Tour wins (1) ===
No.	Date	Tournament	Winning score	Margin of victory	Runner-up
1	9 Sep 2018	Abierto del Club Los Lagartos	−5 (69-67-72-71=279)	Playoff	(Colombia) David Vanegas

=== NGA Pro Golf Tour wins (1) ===
- 2010 Woodcreek Classic

=== Other Colombian wins (2) ===
- 2008 Colombian Open
- 2010 Máster Profesional

== Team appearances ==
- World Cup (representing Colombia): 2011

== See also ==
- List of Florida Gators golfers
