= Diego Velásquez (golfer) =

Colombian professional golfer (born 1987)

Personal information
- Full name: Diego Fernando Velásquez Rivas
- Nationality: Colombia
- Born: 22 November 1987 (age 38) Bogotá, Colombia
- Height: 5 ft 7 in (170 cm)
- Weight: 145 lb (66 kg)

Career
- Sport: Golf
- College: Oregon State University
- Turned professional: 2010
- Current tour: Colombian Tour
- Former tours: Web.com Tour; PGA Tour Latinoamérica
- Professional wins: 4

Diego Fernando Velásquez Rivas (born 22 November 1987) is a Colombian professional golfer who currently plays on PGA Tour Latinoamérica.

== Amateur career ==
Velásquez represented Oregon State University while at college becoming the first player from Oregon State to be a first team All-American player.

During his time at college, Velásquez won several amateur events including the 2008 Giustina Memorial Classic, the 2009 Western Intercollegiate and the 2010 Bank of Tennessee Intercollegiate.

== Professional career ==
On finishing college in 2010, Velásquez turned professional. He played eight events on the Nationwide Tour in 2011 through sponsor exemptions with a best finish of sixth place at the Miccosukee Championship. By finishing 98th on the money list, he earned status for 2012.

In 2012, Velásquez continued to play on the Web.com Tour but failed to retain his playing rights and has played on PGA Tour Latinoamérica since 2013.

In March 2015, Velásquez recorded his first Official World Golf Ranking event win at the 2015 Avianca Colombian Open.

== Amateur wins ==
- 2008 Giustina Memorial Classic
- 2009 Western Intercollegiate
- 2010 Bank of Tennessee Intercollegiate.

== Professional wins (4) ==
=== PGA Tour Latinoamerica wins (1) ===
| No. | Date | Tournament | Winning score | Margin of victory | Runner-up |
|---|---|---|---|---|---|
| 1 | 22 Mar 2015 | Avianca Colombia Open | −18 (65-69-67-65=266) | 6 strokes | (United States) Alex Moon |

=== Colombian Tour wins (3) ===
| No. | Date | Tournament | Winning score | Margin of victory | Runner-up |
|---|---|---|---|---|---|
| 1 | 14 Feb 2015 | Abierto de La Pradera | −16 (70-66-70-68=272) | 1 stroke | (Argentina) Jorge Fernández-Valdés |
| 2 | 13 Feb 2016 | Abierto de La Pradera (2) | −9 (68-65-73-73=279) | 1 stroke | (Colombia) Jesús Amaya |
| 3 | 16 Jul 2017 | Abierto Club Militar | −20 (64-63-72-69=268) | 8 strokes | (Colombia) Nico Echavarría |

== Team appearances ==
Amateur

- Eisenhower Trophy (representing Colombia): 2008
