= Mundo Maya Open =

Tournament information
- Location: Yucatán, Mexico
- Established: 2012
- Courses: Yucatán Country Club (Jaguar Golf Course)
- Par: 72
- Length: 7,282 yards (6,659 m)
- Tour: PGA Tour Latinoamérica
- Format: Stroke play
- Prize fund: US$175,000
- Month played: October
- Final year: 2015

Tournament record score
- Aggregate: 266 Tommy Cocha (2012)
- To par: −22 as above

Final champion
- (United States) Nicholas Lindheim
- Location in Mexico Location in Yucatán

The Mundo Maya Open was a men's professional golf tournament held in Mexico on PGA Tour Latinoamérica.

The tournament was the inaugural event on PGA Tour Latinoamérica when it was first hosted in 2012 and has been hosted on the Jack Nicklaus designed El Jaguar course at the Yucatán Country Club since its inception. The inaugural winner for the event was Tommy Cocha with an aggregate score of a 266 which remains a tournament record.

== Winners ==
Year	Winner	Score	To par	Margin of victory	Runner(s)-up	Ref.
2015	(United States) Nicholas Lindheim	270	−18	2 strokes	(Brazil) Daniel Stapff	
2014	(United States) Daniel Mazziotta	278	−10	4 strokes	(United States) Bryan Bigley (Canada) Peter Campbell (Mexico) Rodolfo Cazaubón (United States) Rick Cochran III (United States) Brad Hopfinger (United States) Robert Rohanna	
2013	(Argentina) Jorge Fernández-Valdés	277	−11	1 stroke	(Mexico) Armando Villarreal	
2012	(Argentina) Tommy Cocha	266	−22	5 strokes	(Mexico) Óscar Fraustro	
