= Gira de Golf Profesional Mexicana seasons =

This page lists all Gira de Golf Profesional Mexicana seasons from its inaugural season in 2017.

Since its inception, most tournaments on the Gira de Golf Profesional Mexicana have been played in Mexico.

== 2026–27 season ==
=== Schedule ===
The following table lists official events during the 2026–27 season.

Date	Tournament	Location	Purse (Mex$)	Winner (Note: The number in brackets after each winner's name is the number of Gira de Golf Profesional Mexicana events they had won up to and including that tournament.)	OWGR points
7 Aug	Mexico City Open	México	2,000,000	(Mexico) Santiago de la Fuente (3)	1.05
19 Sep	Atlas Open	Jalisco	2,000,000	(Mexico) José de Jesús Rodríguez (13)	0.81
14 Nov	Copa Multimedios	Nuevo León	2,000,000	(Venezuela) Jorge García (1)	1.18
20 Feb	La Loma Open	San Luis Potosí			

== 2025–26 season ==
=== Schedule ===
The following table lists official events during the 2025–26 season.

Date	Tournament	Location	Purse (Mex$)	Winner	OWGR points
8 Aug	Mexico City Open	México	1,800,000	(Mexico) Santiago de la Fuente (1)	1.20
6 Sep	Amanali Classic	Hidalgo	1,800,000	(Mexico) Santiago de la Fuente (2)	1.29
18 Oct	Bajío Open	Guanajuato	1,800,000	(Mexico) Alejandro Madariaga (1)	0.95
22 Nov	Copa Multimedios	Nuevo León	1,800,000	(Mexico) José de Jesús Rodríguez (12)	1.40
19 Dec	Jaguar Open	Sinaloa	1,800,000	(Mexico) Sebastián Vázquez (7)	0.98
24 Jan	El Salvador Open	El Salvador	1,800,000	(Venezuela) Manuel Torres (2)	0.86
21 Mar	Copa Prissa	Puebla	1,800,000	(Mexico) Emilio López (1)	0.97
25 Apr	Caliente.mx Open	Baja California	1,800,000	(Mexico) José Cristóbal Islas (4)	0.90
30 May	Tour Championship	Guanajuato	3,000,000	(Venezuela) Manuel Torres (3)	1.18

=== Order of Merit ===
The Order of Merit was based on tournament results during the season, calculated using a points-based system.

Position	Player	Points
1	(Mexico) José de Jesús Rodríguez	1,203,163
2	(Mexico) Alejandro Madariaga	1,134,371
3	(Mexico) José Cristóbal Islas	1,015,320
4	(Venezuela) Manuel Torres	972,350
5	(Mexico) Sebastián Vázquez	856,994

== 2024–25 season ==
=== Schedule ===
The following table lists official events during the 2024–25 season.

Date	Tournament	Location	Purse (Mex$)	Winner	OWGR points
9 Aug	Mexico City Open	México	1,800,000	(Mexico) José Cristóbal Islas (2)	0.93
7 Sep	Amanali Classic	Hidalgo	1,800,000	(Mexico) José Cristóbal Islas (3)	0.74
26 Oct	Bajío Open	Guanajuato	1,800,000	(Mexico) Raúl Pereda (3)	0.93
2 Nov	Copa Multimedios	Nuevo León	1,800,000	(United States) Joel Thelen (2)	1.22
14 Dec	Jaguar Golf Open	Sinaloa	1,800,000	(United States) Joel Thelen (3)	0.68
25 Jan	El Salvador Open Championship	El Salvador	1,800,000	(Colombia) Felipe Álvarez Cataño (1)	1.12
28 Feb	Chapultepec Championship	México	1,800,000	(Mexico) Luis Garza (2)	1.50
22 Mar	Copa Prissa	Puebla	1,800,000	(Mexico) Luis Garza (3)	1.48
12 Apr	El Campanario Classic	Querétaro	1,800,000	(Mexico) José de Jesús Rodríguez (11)	1.70
17 May	Tour Championship	Guanajuato	3,000,000	(United States) Joel Thelen (4)	1.11

=== Order of Merit ===
The Order of Merit was based on tournament results during the season, calculated using a points-based system.

Position	Player	Points
1	(United States) Joel Thelen	1,167,541
2	(Mexico) Luis Garza	1,086,266
3	(Mexico) José de Jesús Rodríguez	1,070,058
4	(Mexico) Alejandro Madariaga	925,365
5	(Colombia) Felipe Álvarez Cataño	816,069

== 2023–24 season ==
=== Schedule ===
The following table lists official events during the 2023–24 season.

Date	Tournament	Location	Purse (Mex$)	Winner	OWGR points
18 Aug	Club de Golf México Invitational	México	1,800,000	(Brazil) Alexandre Rocha (3)	1.20
23 Sep	Amanali Classic	Hidalgo	1,800,000	(Guatemala) José Toledo (7)	1.02
21 Oct	Copa Simsa	Coahuila	1,800,000	(Mexico) Álvaro Ortiz (1)	0.79
11 Nov	Copa Milenio	Nuevo León	1,800,000	(United States) Josh Radcliff (1)	1.25
8 Dec	El Jaguar Golf Open	Yucatán	1,800,000	(Mexico) Álvaro Ortiz (2)	1.36
21 Jan	El Salvador Open Championship	El Salvador	1,800,000	(Mexico) José de Jesús Rodríguez (10)	0.81
2 Mar	Copa Prissa	Puebla	1,800,000	(Mexico) Roberto Lebrija (1)	1.07
9 Mar	Wipa's Open	Morelos	1,800,000	(Canada) Sebastian Szirmak (1)	1.10
6 Apr	Villa Rica Classic	Veracruz	1,800,000	(Canada) Sebastian Szirmak (2)	0.75
12 May	Tour Championship	Guanajuato	3,000,000	(Brazil) Alexandre Rocha (4)	1.08

=== Order of Merit ===
The Order of Merit was based on tournament results during the season, calculated using a points-based system.

Position	Player	Points
1	(Mexico) José de Jesús Rodríguez	941,763
2	(Brazil) Alexandre Rocha	917,992
3	(Mexico) Roberto Lebrija	847,174
4	(Mexico) Álvaro Ortiz	836,325
5	(Canada) Sebastian Szirmak	795,794

== 2022–23 season ==
=== Schedule ===
The following table lists official events during the 2022–23 season.

Date	Tournament	Location	Purse (Mex$)	Winner	OWGR points
20 Aug	Amanali Classic	Hidalgo	1,600,000	(United States) Joel Thelen (1)	n/a
8 Oct	Abierto del Bajío	Guanajuato	1,600,000	(Mexico) Isidro Benítez (4)	n/a
12 Nov	Copa Multimedios	Nuevo León	1,600,000	(Mexico) Raúl Pereda (2)	n/a
29 Jan	El Campanario Classic	Querétaro	1,600,000	(Mexico) José Cristóbal Islas (a) (1)	0.97
11 Feb	Tabachines Classic	Morelos	1,600,000	(Guatemala) José Toledo (5)	0.84
4 Mar	Copa Prissa	Puebla	1,600,000	(Mexico) Carlos Ortiz (2)	1.83
15 Apr	Abierto de Aguascalientes	Aguascalientes	1,600,000	(Mexico) Luis Garza (1)	0.64
20 May	Altozano Open	Michoacán	1,600,000	(Mexico) José de Jesús Rodríguez (9)	0.72
11 Jun	Pro-Am Ventanas de San Miguel	Guanajuato	1,600,000	(Brazil) Alexandre Rocha (2)	0.49
16 Jul	Gran Final Tres Vidas Acapulco	Guerrero	3,000,000	(Guatemala) José Toledo (6)	0.59

=== Order of Merit ===
The Order of Merit was based on tournament results during the season, calculated using a points-based system.

Position	Player	Points
1	(Guatemala) José Toledo	1,710,350
2	(Mexico) Isidro Benítez	845,802
3	(Mexico) Sebastián Vázquez	732,861
4	(Mexico) Álvaro Ortiz	713,422
5	(Brazil) Alexandre Rocha	692,882

== 2021–22 season ==
=== Schedule ===
The following table lists official events during the 2021–22 season.

Date	Tournament	Location	Purse (Mex$)	Winner
7 Mar	Copa Tequila Azulejos	Guerrero	1,600,000	(Mexico) José de Jesús Rodríguez (6)
24 Apr	Copa Prissa	Puebla	1,600,000	(Guatemala) José Toledo (2)
9 May	Copa Multimedios	Nuevo León	1,600,000	(Guatemala) José Toledo (3)
5 Jun	Amanali Classic	Hidalgo	1,600,000	(Mexico) José de Jesús Rodríguez (7)
4 Jul	Torneo Pro-Am	Guanajuato	1,600,000	(Guatemala) José Toledo (4)
30 Oct	Etapa 6	Guanajuato	1,600,000	(Venezuela) Manuel Torres (1)
19 Dec	Etapa 7	Veracruz	1,600,000	(Mexico) Aarón Terrazas (1)
12 Feb	El Campanario Classic	Querétaro	1,600,000	(Mexico) Gonzalo Rubio (2)
12 Mar	Copa Prissa	Puebla	1,600,000	(Mexico) Isidro Benítez (3)
24 Apr	Etapa 10	Veracruz	1,600,000	(Mexico) Sebastián Vázquez (6)
19 Jun	Etapa Final	Quintana Roo	3,000,000	(Mexico) José de Jesús Rodríguez (8)

=== Order of Merit ===
The Order of Merit was based on tournament results during the season, calculated using a points-based system.

Position	Player	Points
1	(Guatemala) José Toledo	1,788,022
2	(Mexico) José de Jesús Rodríguez	1,280,680
3	(Venezuela) Manuel Torres	877,727
4	(Mexico) Isidro Benítez	850,649
5	(United States) Josh Radcliff	578,146

== 2019–20 season ==
=== Schedule ===
The following table lists official events during the 2019–20 season.

Date	Tournament	Location	Purse (Mex$)	Winner
13 Oct	Copa Tequila Azulejos	Guerrero	1,600,000	(Mexico) José de Jesús Rodríguez (5)
24 Nov	Amanali Classic	Hidalgo	1,600,000	(Mexico) Sebastián Vázquez (4)
8 Dec	Copa Puro Sinaloa	Sinaloa	1,600,000	(Mexico) Juan Carlos Benítez (1)
2 Feb	Etapa 4	Jalisco	1,600,000	(Mexico) Isidro Benítez (1)
9 Feb	Copa Prissa	Puebla	1,600,000	(Mexico) Isidro Benítez (2)
15 Mar	Wipas Invitational	Morelos	1,600,000	(Mexico) Armando Favela (3)
29 Nov	Pro-Am Ventanas de San Miguel	Guanajuato	1,600,000	(Mexico) Sebastián Vázquez (5)
17 Jan	Copa Puro Sinaloa	Sinaloa	3,000,000	(Mexico) Rodolfo Cazaubón (2)

=== Order of Merit ===
The Order of Merit was based on tournament results during the season, calculated using a points-based system.

Position	Player	Points
1	(Mexico) José de Jesús Rodríguez	958,013
2	(Mexico) Isidro Benítez	801,397
3	(Mexico) Sebastián Vázquez	735,348
4	(Mexico) Rodolfo Cazaubón	687,077
5	(Mexico) Armando Favela	650,380

== 2018–19 season ==
=== Schedule ===
The following table lists official events during the 2018–19 season.

Date	Tournament	Location	Purse (Mex$)	Winner
8 Apr	Bosque Real Classic	México	1,600,000	(Mexico) Gonzalo Rubio (1)
12 Apr	Etapa 2	México	1,600,000	(Mexico) Juan Carlos Serrano (1)
29 Apr	Etapa 3	Guanajuato	1,600,000	(Colombia) Camilo Aguado (1)
6 May	Etapa 4	San Luis Potosí	1,600,000	(Mexico) Erácleo Bermúdez (1)
10 Jun	Etapa 5	Querétaro	1,600,000	(Mexico) Nicholas Maruri (1)
17 Jun	Etapa 6	México	1,600,000	(Colombia) Jesús Rivas (1)
22 Jul	Etapa 7	Coahuila	1,600,000	(Mexico) Luis Felipe Torres (1)
29 Jul	Etapa 8	Hidalgo	1,600,000	(Mexico) José Octavio González (1)
20 Oct	Copa Milenio Televisión	Nuevo León	1,600,000	(Mexico) Armando Favela (1)
3 Nov	Etapa 10	Guanajuato	1,600,000	(Mexico) Raúl Pereda (1)
1 Dec	Copa ProTam	Tamaulipas	1,600,000	(Guatemala) José Toledo (1)
15 Dec	Copa Puro Sinaloa	Sinaloa	1,600,000	(Mexico) Armando Favela (2)
16 Feb	Copa Prissa	Puebla	1,600,000	(Brazil) Alexandre Rocha (1)
23 Mar	Copa José Miguel Nader	México	1,200,000	(Mexico) Sebastián Vázquez (2)
31 Mar	Copa Puro Sinaloa	Sinaloa	1,600,000	(Mexico) Óscar Serna (1)
12 May	Sheriff's Invitational	Guerrero	3,000,000	(Mexico) Sebastián Vázquez (3)

=== Order of Merit ===
The Order of Merit was based on tournament results during the season, calculated using a points-based system.

Position	Player	Points
1	(Mexico) Sebastián Vázquez	1,716,160
2	(Colombia) Camilo Aguado	1,155,198
3	(Mexico) Armando Favela	1,073,600
4	(Mexico) Alejandro Villasana	921,765
5	(Mexico) Luis Felipe Torres	897,132

== 2017–18 season ==
=== Schedule ===
The following table lists official events during the 2017–18 season.

Date	Tournament	Location	Purse (Mex$)	Winner
29 May	Bosque Real Championship	México	1,600,000	(Mexico) Carlos Ortiz (1)
14 Jun	Etapa 2	Guanajuato	1,600,000	(Mexico) José de Jesús Rodríguez (1)
23 Jul	Etapa 3	San Luis Potosí	1,600,000	(Mexico) Andrés García (1)
27 Aug	Mayakoba Open	Quintana Roo	1,600,000	(Mexico) José de Jesús Rodríguez (2)
20 Sep	Etapa 5	Querétaro	1,600,000	(Mexico) José de Jesús Rodríguez (3)
22 Oct	La Vista Championship	Puebla	2,000,000	(Mexico) Armando Villarreal (1)
17 Nov	Etapa 7	Nuevo León	1,600,000	(Mexico) José de Jesús Rodríguez (4)
17 Dec	Copa Puro Sinaloa	Sinaloa	1,600,000	(Mexico) Sebastián Vázquez (1)
21 Jan	Puro Sinaloa Culiacán	Sinaloa	1,600,000	(Peru) Joaquín Lolas (1)
25 Feb	Copa Tequila Azulejos	Guerrero	2,000,000	(Mexico) Rodolfo Cazaubón (1)
18 Mar	Copa Vidanta	Nayarit	3,000,000	(Mexico) Gerardo Ruiz (1)

=== Order of Merit ===
The Order of Merit was based on tournament results during the season, calculated using a points-based system.

Position	Player	Points
1	(Mexico) Gerardo Ruiz	1,708,249
2	(Mexico) José de Jesús Rodríguez	1,200,640
3	(Mexico) Carlos Ortiz	1,048,563
4	(Mexico) Armando Villarreal	996,786
5	(Mexico) Sebastián Vázquez	880,211
