= Nico Echavarría =

Colombian professional golfer (born 1994)

Personal information
- Full name: Nicolás Echavarría Botero
- Nationality: Colombia
- Born: 4 August 1994 (age 32) Medellín, Colombia
- Height: 6 ft 0 in (183 cm)
- Weight: 165 lb (75 kg)

Career
- Sport: Golf
- College: University of Arkansas
- Turned professional: 2017
- Current tour: PGA Tour
- Former tours: Korn Ferry Tour; PGA Tour Latinoamérica; Colombian Tour
- Professional wins: 7
- Highest ranking: 34 (1 March 2026) (as of 25 October 2026)

Number of wins by tour
- PGA Tour: 3
- Other: 4

Best results in major championships
- Masters Tournament: 51st: 2025
- PGA Championship: T41: 2025
- U.S. Open: 54th: 2024
- The Open Championship: T67: 2026

Nicolás Echavarría Botero (born 4 August 1994) is a Colombian professional golfer who plays on the PGA Tour. He claimed his first PGA Tour victory in his rookie season at the Puerto Rico Open.

== Amateur career ==
Echavarría attended the University of Arkansas from 2013 to 2017. He also represented Colombia in the Eisenhower Trophy in 2016.

== Professional career ==
Echavarría turned professional in February 2017, making his first professional start at the Avianca Colombia Open later that month. He won twice during the 2018 PGA Tour Latinoamérica season, finishing second in the Order of Merit, gaining a card for the 2019 Korn Ferry Tour season.

Echavarría gained a PGA Tour card for the 2022–23 season, via the 2022 Korn Ferry Tour Finals. In March 2023, he won the Puerto Rico Open. He shot a total of 21-under-par to win by two shots ahead of Akshay Bhatia. He claimed his second PGA Tour win in October 2024 at the Zozo Championship in Japan.

On 9 April 2025, Echavarría won the Masters Tournament Par 3 Contest after finishing nine holes at five under par and prevailing in a sudden death playoff with J. J. Spaun.

In March 2026, Echavarría won the Cognizant Classic. He was three shots back with three holes left but shot a 5-under 66 in the final round as leader Shane Lowry made back-to-back double bogeys on the 16th and 17th hole. The victory earned Echavarría a spot in the Masters field.

== Personal life ==
Echavarría's brother Andrés is also a professional golfer.

== Professional wins (7) ==
=== PGA Tour wins (3) ===
No.	Date	Tournament	Winning score	Margin of victory	Runner(s)-up
1	5 Mar 2023	Puerto Rico Open	−21 (67-67-65-68=267)	2 strokes	(United States) Akshay Bhatia
2	27 Oct 2024	Zozo Championship^{1}	−20 (64-64-65-67=260)	1 stroke	(United States) Max Greyserman, (United States) Justin Thomas
3	1 Mar 2026	Cognizant Classic	−17 (63-72-66-66=267)	2 strokes	(Republic of Ireland) Shane Lowry, (United States) Taylor Moore, (United States) Austin Smotherman

^{1}Co-sanctioned by the Japan Golf Tour, but unofficial event on that tour.

PGA Tour playoff record (0–1)

No.	Year	Tournament	Opponent	Result
1	2025	Sony Open in Hawaii	(Canada) Nick Taylor	Lost to birdie on second extra hole

=== PGA Tour Latinoamérica wins (2) ===
No.	Date	Tournament	Winning score	Margin of victory	Runner-up
1	16 Sep 2018	Sao Paulo Golf Club Championship	−19 (64-66-68-67=265)	1 stroke	(Argentina) Augusto Núñez
2	7 Oct 2018	San Luis Championship	−19 (68-68-63-70=269)	4 strokes	(Mexico) Raúl Cortes

=== Colombian Tour wins (2) ===
No.	Date	Tournament	Winning score	Margin of victory	Runners-up
1	24 Jun 2018	Abierto Club Campestre de Cali	−7 (69-68-73-67=277)	2 strokes	(Colombia) Ricardo Celia, (Colombia) Marcelo Rozo
2	20 Aug 2018	Abierto Club Campestre de Medellín	−6 (70-73-67-72=282)	5 strokes	(Colombia) Geovanny Agudelo, (Colombia) Jesús Amaya, (Colombia) Ómar Beltrán

== Results in major championships ==
Tournament	2023	2024	2025	2026
Masters Tournament			51	CUT
PGA Championship	CUT		T41	CUT
U.S. Open	CUT	54	CUT	T56
The Open Championship			CUT	T67

Did not play

CUT = missed the half-way cut
"T" = tied

=== Summary ===
Tournament	Wins	2nd	3rd	Top-5	Top-10	Top-25	Events	Cuts made
Masters Tournament	0	0	0	0	0	0	2	1
PGA Championship	0	0	0	0	0	0	3	1
U.S. Open	0	0	0	0	0	0	4	2
The Open Championship	0	0	0	0	0	0	2	1
Totals	0	0	0	0	0	0	11	5

- Most consecutive cuts made – 3 (2024 U.S. Open – 2025 PGA Championship)

== Results in The Players Championship ==
Tournament	2023	2024	2025	2026
The Players Championship	CUT	CUT	CUT	T66

CUT = missed the halfway cut
"T" indicates a tie for a place

== Team appearances ==
Amateur

- Eisenhower Trophy (representing Colombia): 2016

Professional

- Presidents Cup (representing the International team): 2026

== See also ==
- 2022 Korn Ferry Tour Finals graduates
