= Carlos Ortiz (golfer) =

Mexican professional golfer (born 1991)

Personal information
- Full name: Carlos Ortiz Becerra
- Nationality: Mexico
- Born: 24 April 1991 (age 35) Guadalajara, Jalisco, Mexico
- Height: 6 ft 0 in (183 cm)
- Weight: 150 lb (68 kg)

Career
- Sport: Golf
- College: University of North Texas
- Turned professional: 2013
- Current tours: LIV Golf; Gira de Golf Profesional Mexicana
- Former tours: PGA Tour; European Tour; Web.com Tour
- Professional wins: 10
- Highest ranking: 44 (28 February 2021) (as of 25 October 2026)

Number of wins by tour
- PGA Tour: 1
- Asian Tour: 2
- Korn Ferry Tour: 3
- LIV Golf: 1
- Other: 3

Best results in major championships
- Masters Tournament: CUT: 2021, 2026
- PGA Championship: T55: 2021
- U.S. Open: T4: 2025
- The Open Championship: CUT: 2021, 2025

Achievements and awards
- Web.com Tour regular season money list winner: 2014
- Web.com Tour Player of the Year: 2014
Medal record
Summer Universiade
Bronze medal – third place	2011 Shenzhen	Men's team

Carlos Ortiz Becerra (Note: In this Spanish name, the first or paternal surname is Ortiz and the second or maternal family name is Becerra.) (born 24 April 1991) is a Mexican professional golfer who has played on the PGA Tour and Web.com Tour. He won the 2020 Vivint Houston Open on the PGA Tour. He now plays in the LIV Golf League.

== Early life ==
Ortiz was born in Guadalajara, Jalisco, Mexico. He played college golf in the United States at the University of North Texas. At the 2011 Summer Universiade, he was on the team that won the bronze medal. He played in the Mexican team at the 2010 Eisenhower Trophy and again in 2012 where Mexico was the runner-up.

His younger brother Álvaro is a professional golfer who represented Mexico in the Eisenhower Trophy in 2014, 2016 and 2018 and won the 2019 Latin America Amateur Championship.

== Professional career ==
Ortiz turned professional in 2013. He finished T-15 at the Web.com Tour qualifying school after playing in the first, second and final stages. He then joined the Tour in 2014. He won the fourth event of the year, the Panama Claro Championship. He won his second Web.com Tour event three weeks later at the El Bosque Mexico Championship and moved inside the top 200 in the Official World Golf Ranking. Ortiz was given a sponsor exemption to compete in the 2014 Memorial Tournament, where he finished T-65 in his PGA Tour debut. He won his third Web.com event of the season at the WinCo Foods Portland Open, earning fully exempt status on the 2014−15 PGA Tour as a three-time, single-season winner. He was later voted the Web.com Tour Player of the Year.

In his first full PGA Tour season, Ortiz finished 93rd in the FedEx Cup and had a season-best finish of T9 at the OHL Classic at Mayakoba. However he lost his place on the tour after a poor 2016 season. He played on the Web.com Tour in 2017 and 2018 and regained his place on the PGA Tour after the 2018 season. He finished the 2018–19 PGA Tour season 113th in the FedEx Cup Playoffs with a best finish of tied for third place in the Sanderson Farms Championship, played in late 2018.

In November 2020, Ortiz won his first PGA Tour event at the Vivint Houston Open. He became the third Mexican winner on the PGA Tour after Victor Regalado and César Sañudo. The last PGA Tour victory by a Mexican born player, before Ortiz's win, was 42 years earlier by Regalado at the 1978 Quad Cities Open. The win by Ortiz qualified him for the 2021 Masters Tournament.

On 9 June 2024, Ortiz won his first tournament on the LIV Golf League by winning the LIV Houston event by one shot over Adrian Meronk.

Ortiz represented Mexico in the men's individual tournament at the 2020 Summer Olympics in Tokyo and the 2024 Summer Olympic in Paris.

== Professional wins (10) ==
=== PGA Tour wins (1) ===
No.	Date	Tournament	Winning score	To par	Margin of victory	Runners-up
1	8 Nov 2020	Vivint Houston Open	67-68-67-65=267	−13	2 strokes	(United States) Dustin Johnson, (Japan) Hideki Matsuyama

=== Asian Tour wins (2) ===
Legend
International Series (2)
Other Asian Tour (0)

No.	Date	Tournament	Winning score	To par	Margin of victory	Runner-up
1	25 Feb 2024	International Series Oman	67-69-68-65=269	−19	4 strokes	(South Africa) Louis Oosthuizen
2	23 Mar 2025	International Series Macau	67-61-66-64=258	−22	3 strokes	(United States) Patrick Reed

=== Web.com Tour wins (3) ===
No.	Date	Tournament	Winning score	To par	Margin of victory	Runner(s)-up
1	23 Mar 2014	Panama Claro Championship	70-68-66-64=268	−12	4 strokes	(United States) Jason Gore
2	13 Apr 2014	El Bosque Mexico Championship	74-67-66-68=275	−13	2 strokes	(United States) Justin Thomas
3	24 Aug 2014	WinCo Foods Portland Open	66-63-70-71=270	−14	1 stroke	(United States) Jason Gore, (Canada) Adam Hadwin

=== Gira de Golf Profesional Mexicana wins (2) ===
No.	Date	Tournament	Winning score	To par	Margin of victory	Runner-up
1	29 May 2017	Bosque Real Championship	66-67-69=202	−14	5 strokes	(Mexico) Armando Villarreal
2	4 Mar 2023	Copa Prissa	72-66-67=205	−11	2 strokes	(Mexico) Isidro Benítez

=== Colombian Tour wins (1) ===
No.	Date	Tournament	Winning score	To par	Margin of victory	Runner-up
1	8 Feb 2014	Abierto de La Pradera	68-66-68-70=272	−16	5 strokes	(Colombia) Marcelo Rozo

=== LIV Golf League wins (1) ===
No.	Date	Tournament	Winning score	To par	Margin of victory	Runner-up
1	9 Jun 2024	LIV Golf Houston	66-68-67=201	−15	1 stroke	(Poland) Adrian Meronk

== Playoff record ==
LIV Golf League playoff record (0–1)

No.	Year	Tournament	Opponents	Result
1	2023	LIV Golf Tucson	(New Zealand) Danny Lee, (South Africa) Louis Oosthuizen, (United States) Brendan Steele	Lee won with birdie on second extra hole Ortiz eliminated by par on first hole

== Results in major championships ==
Results not in chronological order in 2020.

Tournament	2016	2017	2018
Masters Tournament			
U.S. Open	CUT		
The Open Championship			
PGA Championship			

Tournament	2019	2020	2021	2022	2023	2024	2025	2026
Masters Tournament			CUT					CUT
PGA Championship		CUT	T55	CUT				
U.S. Open	T52		CUT		CUT		T4	CUT
The Open Championship		NT	CUT				CUT	

Top 10
Did not play

CUT = missed the half-way cut
"T" indicates a tie for a place
NT = no tournament due to COVID-19 pandemic

=== Summary ===
Tournament	Wins	2nd	3rd	Top-5	Top-10	Top-25	Events	Cuts made
Masters Tournament	0	0	0	0	0	0	2	0
PGA Championship	0	0	0	0	0	0	3	1
U.S. Open	0	0	0	1	1	1	6	2
The Open Championship	0	0	0	0	0	0	2	0
Totals	0	0	0	1	1	1	13	3

- Most consecutive cuts made – 1 (three times)
- Longest streak of top-10s – 1 (once)

== Results in The Players Championship ==
Tournament	2016	2017	2018	2019	2020	2021	2022
The Players Championship	CUT				C	CUT	CUT

CUT = missed the halfway cut
C = Cancelled after the first round due to the COVID-19 pandemic

== Results in World Golf Championships ==
Tournament	2020	2021
Championship	T16	T15
Match Play	NT^{1}	T42
Invitational		T36
Champions	NT^{1}	NT^{1}

^{1}Cancelled due to COVID-19 pandemic

Did not play

NT = No tournament
"T" = Tied

== Team appearances ==
Amateur

- Eisenhower Trophy (representing Mexico): 2010, 2012

== See also ==
- 2014 Web.com Tour Finals graduates
- 2018 Web.com Tour Finals graduates
