= Armando Favela =

Mexican golfer (born 1986)

Personal information
- Full name: Ramón Armando Favela Álvarez
- Nationality: Mexico
- Born: 23 April 1986 (age 40) Coronado, California, U.S.
- Height: 1.73 m (5 ft 8 in)
- Weight: 69 kg (152 lb; 10.9 st)

Career
- Sport: Golf
- College: Loyola University Chicago
- Turned professional: 2010
- Current tour: Web.com Tour
- Former tours: PGA Tour Latinoamérica; Canadian Tour
- Professional wins: 4

Ramón Armando Favela Álvarez (born 23 April 1986) is a Mexican professional golfer who plays on PGA Tour Latinoamérica.

Having graduated from Loyola University Chicago in 2009 as the most accomplished golfer in the university's history, Favela turned pro the following year. He made his debut on the Web.com Tour in the same year but has failed to be successful on this tour making just three appearances and just one cut on the Web.com Tour. He made his full debut on PGA Tour Latinoamérica in 2012 at the Mundo Maya Open and made the cut finishing in 11th and continues to play most of his golf on PGA Tour Latinoamérica.

In March 2014, he made his first professional win on PGA Tour Latinoamérica by winning the Stella Artois Open at La Reunion Golf Resort in Antigua, Guatemala, by birdieing the final hole to win by a single shot over Nelson Ledesma. He also finished second at the Abierto de Chile and eighth at the Mexico Open, therefore he ended seventh in the Order of Merit.

== Professional wins (4) ==
=== PGA Tour Latinoamérica wins (1) ===
No.	Date	Tournament	Winning score	Margin of victory	Runner-up
1	30 Mar 2014	Stella Artois Open	−14 (67-68-68-71=274)	1 stroke	(Argentina) Nelson Ledesma

=== Gira de Golf Profesional Mexicana wins (3) ===
No.	Date	Tournament	Winning score	Margin of victory	Runner-up
1	20 Oct 2018	Copa Milenio Televisión	−9 (68-68-71=207)	Playoff	(Mexico) Patricio Guerra
2	15 Dec 2018	Copa Puro Sinaloa	−18 (68-63-67=198)	3 strokes	(United States) Edward Olson
3	15 Mar 2020	Wipas Invitational	−25 (64-65-62=191)	2 strokes	(Mexico) Luis Felipe Torres
