= Gira de Golf Profesional Mexicana =

Professional golf tour

- Current season, competition or edition: 2026–27 Gira de Golf Profesional Mexicana
- Formerly: Gira Profesional de Golf Banorte; Greg Norman Golf Academy Professional Tour
- Sport: Golf
- Founded: 2017
- First season: 2017–18
- Country: Based in Mexico (Note: Schedules have also included events in El Salvador.)
- Most titles: Order of Merit titles: (Mexico) José de Jesús Rodríguez (3) (Guatemala) José Toledo (2); Tournament wins: (Mexico) José de Jesús Rodríguez (13)
- Related competitions: PGA Tour Latinoamérica Developmental Series
- Website: https://www.giramx.golf

The Gira de Golf Profesional Mexicana (GGPM, English: Professional Golf Tour of Mexico) is a professional golf tour for men based in Mexico. The tour was formed in 2017. GGPM events are 54-hole tournaments with 36 hole cuts. The tour also conducts an annual qualifying school and a no-cut championship tournament.

In December 2022, the Official World Golf Ranking announced that the GGPM would receive world ranking points from the start of 2023.

== Order of Merit winners ==
Season	Winner	Points
2025–26	(Mexico) José de Jesús Rodríguez (3)	1,203,163
2024–25	(United States) Joel Thelen	1,167,541
2023–24	(Mexico) José de Jesús Rodríguez (2)	941,763
2022–23	(Guatemala) José Toledo (2)	1,710,350
2021–22	(Guatemala) José Toledo	1,788,022
2019–20	(Mexico) José de Jesús Rodríguez	958,013
2018–19	(Mexico) Sebastián Vázquez	1,716,160
2017–18	(Mexico) Gerardo Ruiz	1,708,249
