= Cristóbal del Solar =

Chilean professional golfer

Personal information
- Full name: Cristóbal Ignacio del Solar Leefhelm
- Nickname: Mr. 57
- Nationality: Chile
- Born: 11 October 1993 (age 33) Viña del Mar, Chile
- Height: 6 ft 1 in (1.85 m)
- Weight: 197 lb (89 kg)

Career
- Sport: Golf
- College: Florida State University
- Turned professional: 2017
- Current tour: PGA Tour
- Former tours: Korn Ferry Tour; PGA Tour Latinoamérica; PGA Tour Canada
- Professional wins: 8

Number of wins by tour
- Korn Ferry Tour: 1
- Other: 7
Medal record
South American Games
Bronze medal – third place	2022 Asunción	Individual

Cristóbal Ignacio del Solar Leefhelm (born 11 October 1993) is a Chilean professional golfer.

== Amateur career ==
Del Solar played college golf at Florida State University, where he won one event, and was named to the All-ACC Team following his junior season.

== Professional career ==
Del Solar began his professional career on PGA Tour Canada in 2017, where he played six events. In 2018, he was the medalist at the PGA Tour Latinoamérica qualifying tournament in Argentina. His first professional win came in the 2018 Center Open, which he won by five strokes. Returning to PGA Tour Latinoamérica in 2019, Del Solar won the Puerto Plata Open for his second career win as a professional.

In February 2024, del Solar shot a round of 57 at the Astara Golf Championship in Colombia on the Korn Ferry Tour. It was the lowest round ever in a PGA Tour sanctioned event. He garnered the nickname "Mr. 57".

== Amateur wins ==
- 2009 Abierto Juvenil De Chile
- 2010 Abierto Juvenil De Chile
- 2017 Irish Creek Collegiate

== Professional wins (8) ==
=== Korn Ferry Tour wins (1) ===
No.	Date	Tournament	Winning score	Margin of victory	Runners-up
1	14 Jul 2024	The Ascendant	−22 (66-68-66-66=266)	4 strokes	(United States) Brian Campbell, (United States) Matthew Riedel

=== PGA Tour Latinoamérica wins (4) ===
No.	Date	Tournament	Winning score	Margin of victory	Runner(s)-up
1	15 Apr 2018	Abierto OSDE del Centro	−12 (68-64-66-74=272)	5 strokes	(United States) M. J. Maguire, (Colombia) Marcelo Rozo
2	5 May 2019	Puerto Plata Open	−14 (66-66-69-69=270)	1 stroke	(United States) Scott Wolfes
3	5 Jun 2022	Volvo Golf Championship	−16 (67-70-69-66=272)	1 stroke	(United States) Mitchell Meissner
4	11 Dec 2022 (2023 season)	Neuquen Argentina Classic	−16 (69-66-69-68=272)	3 strokes	(Sweden) Linus Lilliedahl

=== Chilean Tour wins (3) ===
No.	Date	Tournament	Winning score	Margin of victory	Runner-up
1	16 Jan 2022	Abierto Internacional de Golf Marbella	−16 (70-68-62=200)	4 strokes	(Chile) Gustavo Silva
2	30 Jan 2022	Abierto de Golf Granadilla Country Club	−13 (66-67-70=203)	7 strokes	(Chile) Gustavo Silva
3	26 Nov 2023	Abierto Los Leones	−17 (65-67-67=199)	Playoff	(Argentina) Jorge Fernández-Valdés

== Team appearances ==
- Eisenhower Trophy (representing Chile): 2012

== See also ==
- 2024 Korn Ferry Tour graduates
- Lowest rounds of golf
