= 2020 in golf =

This article summarizes the highlights of professional and amateur golf in the year 2020. The calendar was significantly disrupted by the COVID-19 pandemic, with many events being canceled or postponed, or taking place without spectators.

== Men's professional golf ==
=== Major championships ===
- ~~16–19 July~~: The Open Championship – Canceled due to the COVID-19 pandemic
- 6–9 August (~~14–17 May~~): PGA Championship – Collin Morikawa won by two strokes over Paul Casey and Dustin Johnson; it was his first major championship victory.
- 17–20 September (~~18–21 June~~): U.S. Open – Bryson DeChambeau won his first major championship title by six strokes over Matthew Wolff; he was the only player to finish under par.
- 12–15 November (~~9–12 April~~): Masters Tournament – Dustin Johnson won by five strokes over Im Sung-jae and Cameron Smith. It was his first Masters championship and his second major championship. He set a new tournament record of 20 strokes under par.

=== World Golf Championships ===
- 20–23 February: WGC-Mexico Championship – Patrick Reed won by one stroke over Bryson DeChambeau; it was his second win in the tournament.
- ~~25–29 March~~: WGC-Dell Technologies Match Play – Canceled due to the COVID-19 pandemic
- 30 July – 2 August (~~2–5 July~~): WGC-FedEx St. Jude Invitational – Justin Thomas won by three strokes; it was his second win in the tournament.
- ~~29 October – 1 November~~: WGC-HSBC Champions – Canceled due to the COVID-19 pandemic

=== FedEx Cup playoff events ===
- 20–23 August (~~13–16 August~~): The Northern Trust – Dustin Johnson won by 11 strokes over Harris English; it was his fifth career tournament win in the FedEx Cup playoffs, and his third in the Northern Trust (formerly known as The Barclays).
- 27–30 August (~~20–23 August~~): BMW Championship – Jon Rahm won in a playoff over Dustin Johnson. It was his first FedEx Cup playoff tournament victory.
- 4–7 September (~~27–30 August~~): Tour Championship – Dustin Johnson won by three strokes over Xander Schauffele and Justin Thomas, to win the FedEx Cup for the first time. Johnson had started the tournament 3 strokes ahead of Thomas and 7 strokes ahead of Schauffele, who returned the lowest aggregate score.

=== Other leading PGA Tour events ===
- 12–15 March: The Players Championship – Incomplete; canceled following completion of the first round due to the COVID-19 pandemic.

For a complete list of PGA Tour results see 2019–20 PGA Tour.

=== Leading European Tour events ===
- 8–11 October (~~10–13 September~~): BMW PGA Championship – Tyrrell Hatton won by four strokes from Victor Perez.
- 10–13 December (~~19–22 November~~): DP World Tour Championship, Dubai – Englishman Matt Fitzpatrick won his second DP World Tour Championship, defeating Lee Westwood by one stroke.

For a complete list of European Tour results see 2020 European Tour.

=== Team events ===
- ~~25–27 September~~: Ryder Cup – Postponed until 2021 due to the COVID-19 pandemic

=== Tour leaders ===
- PGA Tour
  - FedEx Cup – (United States) Dustin Johnson
  - Leading money winner – (United States) Justin Thomas (US$7,344,040) (Note: This total does not include FedEx Cup bonuses.)
- European Tour – (England) Lee Westwood (3,128 points)
- Japan Golf Tour – season extended into 2021
- Asian Tour –
- PGA Tour of Australasia – season extended into 2021
- Sunshine Tour – season extended into 2021

=== Awards ===
- PGA Tour
  - PGA Player of the Year – (United States) Justin Thomas
  - Player of the Year (Jack Nicklaus Trophy) – (United States) Dustin Johnson
  - Vardon Trophy – (United States) Webb Simpson
  - Byron Nelson Award – (United States) Webb Simpson
  - Rookie of the Year (Arnold Palmer Award) – (United States) Scottie Scheffler
  - Payne Stewart Award – (United States) Zach Johnson
- European Tour
  - Golfer of the Year – (England) Lee Westwood
  - Rookie of the Year – (Finland) Sami Välimäki
- Korn Ferry Tour
  - Player of the Year – season extended into 2021

=== Results from other tours ===
- 2020–21–22 Asian Tour
- 2020–21 PGA Tour of Australasia
- 2020 PGA Tour Canada – season canceled due to the COVID-19 pandemic.
- 2020 Challenge Tour
- 2020–21 Japan Golf Tour
- 2020–21 PGA Tour Latinoamérica
- 2020–21 Sunshine Tour
- 2020–21 Korn Ferry Tour
- LocaliQ Series

=== Other happenings ===
- 9 February: Rory McIlroy regained the top spot in the Official World Golf Ranking, gaining it for the eighth time, replacing Brooks Koepka.
- 20 March: Official World Golf Ranking frozen at week 11 due to the COVID-19 pandemic.
- 14 June: Official World Golf Ranking restarted at week 24 with the resumption of the PGA Tour and Korn Ferry Tour.
- 19 July: Jon Rahm gained the top spot in the Official World Golf Ranking for the first time, replacing McIlroy.
- 2 August: Justin Thomas gained the top spot in the Official World Golf Ranking for the second time, replacing Rahm.
- 9 August: Rahm regained the number one ranking after finishing in a tie for thirteenth place at the PGA Championship.
- 23 August: Dustin Johnson replaced Rahm as number one in the Official World Golf Ranking following victory in The Northern Trust; it was the sixth time Johnson had reached the top spot.

== Women's professional golf ==
=== LPGA majors ===
- ~~6–9 August~~ (~~23–26 July~~): The Evian Championship – Canceled due to the COVID-19 pandemic
- 20–23 August: Women's British Open – World number 304 Sophia Popov won by two strokes from Thidapa Suwannapura; it was her first major tournament victory.
- 10–13 September (~~2–5 April~~): ANA Inspiration – Mirim Lee won her first major championship, defeating Brooke Henderson and Nelly Korda with a birdie on the first hole of a sudden-death playoff; she made the playoff by chipping in for eagle on the final hole of regulation play.
- 8–11 October (~~25–28 June~~): KPMG Women's PGA Championship – Kim Sei-young won her first major championship by five strokes over fellow countrywoman Inbee Park.
- 10–13 December (~~4–7 June~~): U.S. Women's Open – Kim A-lim, in her first start in a tournament in the United States, won by one stroke over Ko Jin-young and Amy Olson. Kim birdied her last three holes and finished three-under par.

=== Additional LPGA Tour events ===
- 17–20 December (~~19–22 November~~): CME Group Tour Championship – World number 1 Ko Jin-young won by five shots, also finishing first in the money list in the process.

For a complete list of LPGA Tour results, see 2020 LPGA Tour.
For a complete list of Ladies European Tour results see 2020 Ladies European Tour.

=== Team events ===
- ~~27–30 August~~: International Crown – Canceled due to the COVID-19 pandemic

=== Money list leaders ===
- LPGA Tour – (South Korea) Ko Jin-young ($1,667,925)
- Ladies European Tour – (Denmark) Emily Kristine Pedersen (1,249.35 points)
- LPGA of Japan Tour – season extended into 2021
- LPGA of Korea Tour – (South Korea) Kim Hyo-joo (₩797,137,207)
- ALPG Tour – (Australia) Minjee Lee (A$63,618, 2019/20 season)
- Symetra Tour – (Slovenia) Ana Belac (US$49,081)

=== Other tour results ===
- 2020 ALPG Tour
- 2020–21 LPGA of Japan Tour
- 2020 LPGA of Korea Tour
- 2020 Symetra Tour

=== Other happenings ===
- 20 March: Women's World Golf Rankings frozen at week 11 due to the COVID-19 pandemic.
- 20 July: Women's World Golf Rankings resume with altered computation of ranking, back-computed to week 20, when the LPGA of Korea Tour resumed play.

== Senior men's professional golf ==
=== Senior majors ===
- ~~21–24 May~~: Senior PGA Championship – Canceled due to the COVID-19 pandemic
- ~~25–28 June~~: U.S. Senior Open – Canceled due to the COVID-19 pandemic
- ~~23–26 July~~: Senior Open Championship – Canceled due to the COVID-19 pandemic
- 13–16 August (~~9–12 July~~): Senior Players Championship – Jerry Kelly won his first senior major title by two strokes over Scott Parel.
- ~~24–27 September~~ (~~7–10 May~~): Regions Tradition – Canceled due to the COVID-19 pandemic

=== Full results ===
- 2020–21 PGA Tour Champions season – season extended into 2021
- 2020 European Senior Tour – season canceled due to the COVID-19 pandemic.

== Senior women's professional golf ==
- ~~9–12 July~~: U.S. Senior Women's Open – Canceled due to the COVID-19 pandemic
- ~~30 July – 1 August~~: Senior LPGA Championship – Canceled due to the COVID-19 pandemic

== Amateur golf ==
- 16–19 January: Latin America Amateur Championship – Abel Gallegos won by four strokes over Aaron Terrazas.
- ~~22–27 May~~: NCAA Division I Women's Golf Championships – Canceled due to COVID-19 pandemic
- ~~29 May – 3 June~~: NCAA Division I Men's Golf Championships – Canceled due to COVID-19 pandemic
- ~~12–14 June~~: Curtis Cup – Postponed until 2021 due to COVID-19 pandemic
- 3–9 August: U.S. Women's Amateur – Rose Zhang defeated defending champion Gabriela Ruffels in the final, with the match going to the 38th hole.
- 10–16 August: U.S. Amateur – Tyler Strafaci defeated Ollie Osborne in the final, 1 up.
- 24–29 August (~~15–20 June~~): The Amateur Championship – Joe Long defeated Joe Harvey, 4 and 3, in the final.
- 24–29 August (~~23–27 June~~): Women's Amateur Championship – Aline Krauter defeated Annabell Fuller, 1 up, in the final.
- 22–25 September (~~24–27 June~~): European Amateur – Matti Schmid successfully defended his 2019 title.
- 25–28 September: Asia-Pacific Amateur Championship – Canceled due to COVID-19 pandemic
- 30 September – 3 October (~~22–25 July~~): European Ladies Amateur Championship – Paula Schulz-Hanssen of Germany won in a playoff over Chloé Salort of France.
- 14–17 October: Espirito Santo Trophy – Canceled due to COVID-19 pandemic
- 21–24 October: Eisenhower Trophy – Canceled due to COVID-19 pandemic

== Golf in multi-sport events ==
- ~~30 July – 8 August~~: Summer Olympics – Postponed until 2021.

== Deaths ==
- 9 January – Pete Dye (born 1925), American golf course architect and member of the World Golf Hall of Fame.
- 17 February – Mickey Wright (born 1935), American golfer and member of the World Golf Hall of Fame. She won 82 LPGA Tour tournaments, including 13 majors.
- 26 March – John O'Leary (born 1949), Irish professional golfer who won twice on the European Tour.
- 12 April – Doug Sanders (born 1933), American professional golfer who had 20 wins on the PGA Tour.
- 23 April – Peter Gill (born 1930), English professional golf who played on the European Tour.
- 27 April – Edean Anderson Ihlanfeldt (born 1930), American amateur golfer who won the Canadian Women's Amateur and the U.S. Senior Women's Amateur.
- 28 April – Bob Betley (born 1940), American professional golfer who won on the Senior PGA Tour.
- 15 May – Ernie Gonzalez (born 1961), American professional golfer who had one PGA Tour win.
- 15 May – Steve Spray (born 1940), American professional golfer who had one PGA Tour win.
- 11 August – Gordon J. Brand (born 1955), English professional golfer who had one European Tour win.
- 28 August – Mike Joyce (born 1939), American professional golfer who had one Senior PGA Tour win.
- 5 December – Peter Alliss (born 1931), English professional golfer, television presenter, commentator, author and golf course designer. He played on eight Ryder Cup teams, and is known for his commentating at The Open Championship.
- 22 December – Kevin Hartley (born 1934), Australian amateur golfer who won the Australian Amateur and was part of the Australian team that won the 1966 Eisenhower Trophy.

== Table of results ==
This table summarizes all the results referred to above in date order.

Dates	Tournament	Status or tour	Winner
16–19 Jan	Latin America Amateur Championship	Amateur men's individual tournament	(Argentina) Abel Gallegos
20–23 Feb	WGC-Mexico Championship	World Golf Championships	(United States) Patrick Reed
12–15 Mar	The Players Championship	PGA Tour	Incomplete, canceled
~~25–29 Mar~~	WGC-Dell Technologies Match Play	World Golf Championships	Canceled
~~21–24 May~~	Senior PGA Championship	Senior major	Canceled
~~22–27 May~~	NCAA Division I Women's Golf Championships	U.S. college championship	Canceled
~~29 May – 3 Jun~~	NCAA Division I Men's Golf Championships	U.S. college championship	Canceled
~~12–14 Jun~~	Curtis Cup	Amateur women's team event	Postponed until 2021
~~25–28 Jun~~	U.S. Senior Open	Senior major	Canceled
~~9–12 Jul~~	U.S. Senior Women's Open	Senior women's major	Canceled
~~16–19 Jul~~	The Open Championship	Men's major	Canceled
~~23–26 Jul~~	The Senior Open Championship	Senior major	Canceled
30 Jul – 2 Aug	WGC-FedEx St. Jude Invitational	World Golf Championships	(United States) Justin Thomas
~~30 Jul – 1 Aug~~	Senior LPGA Championship	Senior women's major	Canceled
~~30 Jul – 8 Aug~~	Summer Olympics	Men's and women's Olympic competition	Postponed until 2021
6–9 Aug	PGA Championship	Men's major	(United States) Collin Morikawa
~~6–9 Aug~~	The Evian Championship	LPGA Tour and Ladies European Tour major	Canceled
3–9 Aug	U.S. Women's Amateur	Amateur women's individual tournament	(United States) Rose Zhang
10–16 Aug	U.S. Amateur	Amateur men's individual tournament	(United States) Tyler Strafaci
13–16 Aug	Constellation Senior Players Championship	Senior major	(United States) Jerry Kelly
20–23 Aug	AIG Women's British Open	LPGA Tour and Ladies European Tour major	(Germany) Sophia Popov
20–23 Aug	The Northern Trust	PGA Tour FedEx Cup playoff	(United States) Dustin Johnson
24–29 Aug	The Amateur Championship	Amateur men's individual tournament	(England) Joe Long
24–29 Aug	British Ladies Amateur	Amateur women's individual tournament	(Germany) Aline Krauter
27–30 Aug	BMW Championship	PGA Tour FedEx Cup playoff	(Spain) Jon Rahm
~~27–30 Aug~~	International Crown	LPGA Tour team event	Canceled
4–7 Sep	The Tour Championship	PGA Tour FedEx Cup playoff	(United States) Dustin Johnson
10–13 Sep	ANA Inspiration	LPGA major	(South Korea) Mirim Lee
17–20 Sep	U.S. Open	Men's major	(United States) Bryson DeChambeau
22–25 Sep	European Amateur	Amateur men's individual tournament	(Germany) Matti Schmid
~~24–27 Sep~~	Regions Tradition	Senior major	Canceled
~~25–27 Sep~~	Ryder Cup	United States team vs. European team men's professional team event	Postponed until 2021
25–28 Sep	Asia-Pacific Amateur Championship	Amateur men's individual tournament	Canceled
30 Sep – 3 Oct	European Ladies Amateur Championship	Amateur women's individual tournament	(Germany) Paula Schulz-Hanssen
8–11 Oct	BMW PGA Championship	European Tour	(England) Tyrrell Hatton
8–11 Oct	KPMG Women's PGA Championship	LPGA major	(South Korea) Kim Sei-young
~~14–17 Oct~~	Espirito Santo Trophy	Amateur men's individual tournament	Canceled
~~21–24 Oct~~	Eisenhower Trophy	Amateur men's individual tournament	Canceled
~~29 Oct – 1 Nov~~	WGC-HSBC Champions	World Golf Championships	Canceled
12–15 Nov	Masters Tournament	Men's major	(United States) Dustin Johnson
10–13 Dec	DP World Tour Championship, Dubai	European Tour	(England) Matt Fitzpatrick
10–13 Dec	U.S. Women's Open	LPGA major	(South Korea) Kim A-lim
17–20 Dec	CME Group Tour Championship	LPGA Tour	(South Korea) Kim Sei-young
