= 2019 PGA Tour Latinoamérica =

Golf tour season

2019 PGA Tour Latinoamérica season
- Duration: March 27, 2019 – December 8, 2019
- Number of official events: 16
- Most wins: (Argentina) Augusto Núñez (2)
- Order of Merit: (Argentina) Augusto Núñez

The 2019 PGA Tour Latinoamérica was the eighth season of PGA Tour Latinoamérica, the main professional golf tour in Latin America, operated and run by the PGA Tour.

== Schedule ==
The following table lists official events during the 2019 season.

Date	Tournament	Host country	Purse (US$)	Winner (Note: The number in parentheses after each winner's name is the number of PGA Tour Latinoamérica events they had won up to and including that tournament. It is rare for someone to accumulate many wins on the PGA Tour Latinoamérica as success at this level usually leads to promotion to the Korn Ferry Tour.)	OWGR points
Mar 30	Buenaventura Classic	Panama	175,000	(United States) Jared Wolfe (3)	6
Apr 14	Molino Cañuelas Championship	Argentina	175,000	(Colombia) Andrés Echavarría (2)	6
Apr 21	Abierto de Chile	Chile	175,000	(United States) John Somers (1)	7
Apr 28	Abierto OSDE del Centro	Argentina	175,000	(United States) Tom Whitney (1)	6
May 5	Puerto Plata Open	Dominican Republic	175,000	(Chile) Cristóbal del Solar (2)	6
May 19	BMW Jamaica Classic	Jamaica	175,000	(United States) Evan Harmeling (1)	6
May 26	Abierto Mexicano de Golf	Mexico	175,000	(Canada) Drew Nesbitt (1)	6
Jun 2	Bupa Match Play	Mexico	125,000	(United States) Patrick Flavin (1)	6
Sep 22	São Paulo Golf Club Championship	Brazil	175,000	(United States) Chandler Blanchet (1)	6
Sep 29	JHSF Aberto do Brasil	Brazil	175,000	(United States) Shad Tuten (1)	6
Oct 6	Banco del Pacifico Open	Ecuador	175,000	(Argentina) Augusto Núñez (2)	6
Oct 20	Diners Club Peru Open	Peru	175,000	(Argentina) Leandro Marelli (1)	6
Nov 3	Termas de Río Hondo Invitational	Argentina	175,000	(Argentina) Alejandro Tosti (1)	6
Nov 10	Neuquen Argentina Classic	Argentina	175,000	(Argentina) Emilio Domínguez (1)	6
Nov 17	Visa Open de Argentina	Argentina	175,000	(Colombia) Ricardo Celia (1)	6
Dec 8	Shell Championship	United States	175,000	(Argentina) Augusto Núñez (3)	6

== Order of Merit ==
The Order of Merit was based on prize money won during the season, calculated in U.S. dollars. The top five players on the Order of Merit earned status to play on the 2020–21 Korn Ferry Tour.

Position	Player	Prize money ($)
1	(Argentina) Augusto Núñez	148,734
2	(United States) Tom Whitney	86,860
3	(United States) Jared Wolfe	83,250
4	(United States) Evan Harmeling	70,789
5	(United States) John Somers	69,099

== Developmental Series ==
2019 PGA Tour Latinoamérica Developmental Series season
- Duration: 24 January 2019 – 15 December 2019
- Number of official events: 16
- Dev Series Final: (Argentina) Franco Romero

The 2019 PGA Tour Latinoamérica Developmental Series was the seventh season of the PGA Tour Latinoamérica Developmental Series, the official development tour to the PGA Tour Latinoamérica between 2013 and 2023.

=== Schedule ===
The following table lists official events during the 2019 season.

Date	Tournament	Host country	Purse	Winner (Note: The number in parentheses after each winner's name is the number of PGA Tour Latinoamérica Developmental Series events they had won up to and including that tournament. As most Developmental Series events are incorporated from regional tour schedules, details of these wins are displayed there instead.)	Main tour (Note: CHL − Chilean Tour; COL − Colombian Tour; GGPM − Gira de Golf Profesional Mexicana; TPG − TPG Tour.)
Jan 27	Abierto Rocas de Santo Domingo	Chile	CLP$17,500,000	(Chile) Mito Pereira	CHL
Feb 17	Abierto del Sur	Argentina	Arg$900,000	(Argentina) Estanislao Goya	TPG
Mar 31	Abierto Norpatagónico	Argentina	Arg$900,000	(Argentina) Mateo Fernández de Oliveira (a)	TPG
May 12	Sheriff's Invitational	Mexico	Mex$3,000,000	(Mexico) Sebastián Vázquez	GGPM
May 26	Abierto del Norte	Argentina	Arg$900,000	(Argentina) César Costilla	TPG
Jun 15	Abierto Termas de Río Hondo	Argentina	Arg$1,300,000	(Argentina) Clodomiro Carranza	TPG
Jul 6	Venezuela Open	Venezuela	US$20,000	(Venezuela) George Trujillo (2)	
Jul 7	Abierto Club Campestre de Bucaramanga	Colombia	Col$90,000,000	(Colombia) Diego Vanegas	COL
Jul 28	Abierto Club El Rodeo	Colombia	Col$90,000,000	(Argentina) Augusto Núñez	COL
Oct 13	Abierto Hacienda Chicureo	Chile	US$25,000	(Chile) Benjamín Alvarado	CHL
Oct 26	Abierto del Litoral	Argentina	Arg$1,200,000	(Argentina) César Costilla	TPG
Nov 10	Abierto de Ecuador	Ecuador	US$35,000	(Ecuador) José Andrés Miranda (1)	
Nov 24	Amanali Classic	Mexico	Mex$1,600,000	(Mexico) Sebastián Vázquez	GGPM
Dec 1	Andrés Romero Invitational	Argentina	Arg$900,000	(Argentina) Emilio Domínguez	TPG
Dec 8	Copa Puro Sinaloa	Mexico	Mex$1,600,000	(Mexico) Juan Carlos Benítez	GGPM
Dec 15	Samsung Classic Dev Series Final	Peru	US$40,000	(Argentina) Franco Romero (1)	

=== Dev Series Final ===
The Dev Series Final was made up of the top-five finishers of each tournament during the season. The top six finishers in the Dev Series Final earned status to play on the 2020–21 PGA Tour Latinoamérica.

Place	Player	Score	To par
1	(Argentina) Franco Romero	62-66-73-71=272	−16
2	(Colombia) Juan Pablo Luna	71-71-65-65=272	−16
3	(Argentina) César Costilla	67-73-74-61=275	−13
T4	(United States) Matt Hutchins	69-73-69-68=279	−9
T4	(Ecuador) José Andrés Miranda	71-70-70-68=279	−9
T4	(United States) Eric Steger	70-70-72-67=279	−9

== See also ==
- 2019 PGA Tour Canada
- 2019 PGA Tour China
