= Ecuador Open =

Ecuador Open may refer to:

- Ecuador Open (golf)
- Quito Open (golf)
- Ecuador Open (tennis)
