= Argentina Classic =

Annual golf tournament

Neuquen Argentina Classic
Tournament information
- Location: Neuquén, Argentina
- Established: 2012
- Course: Chapelco Golf Club
- Par: 72
- Length: 7,163 yards (6,550 m)
- Tour: PGA Tour Latinoamérica
- Format: Stroke play
- Prize fund: US$175,000
- Month played: December

Tournament record score
- Aggregate: 269 Fabián Gómez (2013); 269 Julián Etulain (2017)
- To par: −19 as above

Current champion
- (Chile) Cristóbal del Solar

Final champion
- Location in Argentina

The Argentina Classic is a men's professional golf tournament held in Argentina and has been part of the PGA Tour Latinoamérica schedule since 2012.

The tournament was first played on PGA Tour Latinoamérica in December 2012 as the "Olivos Golf Classic-Copa Personal" and was held at Olivos Golf Club. The inaugural winner of the event was Ariel Cañete.

In the 2013 season the event moved to La Reserva Cardales and following a sponsorship deal with the telecommunications company BlackBerry the tournament was renamed as the "Personal Classic presentado por BlackBerry".

From 2014 to 2017, the event was played at C.C.G. Las Praderas de Lujan in Luján, Buenos Aires. The tournament moved to Chapelco Golf Club in Neuquén in 2018.

== Winners ==
Year	Winner	Score	To par	Margin of victory	Runner(s)-up	Venue	Ref.
Neuquen Argentina Classic
2022	(Chile) Cristóbal del Solar	272	−16	3 strokes	(Sweden) Linus Lilliedahl	Chapelco	
2020–21: No tournament
2019	(Argentina) Emilio Domínguez	272	−16	Playoff	(United States) Tom Whitney	Chapelco	
2018	(Argentina) Clodomiro Carranza	271	−17	3 strokes	(Argentina) Andrés Gallegos	Chapelco	
NEC Argentina Classic
2017	(Argentina) Julián Etulain	269	−19	1 stroke	(United States) Colin Featherstone (United States) Jared Wolfe	Las Praderas de Lujan	
Argentina Classic
2016	(Spain) Samuel Del Val	203 (Note: Shortened to 54 holes due to weather.)	−13	1 stroke	(Canada) Derek Gillespie (Argentina) Augusto Núñez	Las Praderas de Lujan	
Personal Classic
2015	(Argentina) Fabián Gómez (3)	272	−16	3 strokes	(United States) Kent Bulle	Las Praderas de Lujan	
2014	(Argentina) Fabián Gómez (2)	192	−24	2 strokes	(Argentina) Gustavo Acosta	Las Praderas de Lujan	
2013	(Argentina) Fabián Gómez	269	−19	2 strokes	(Chile) Cristián Espinoza	La Reserva Cardales	
Olivos Golf Classic-Copa Personal
2012	(Argentina) Ariel Cañete	275	−9	2 strokes	(Argentina) Clodomiro Carranza (Argentina) José Cóceres	Olivos	
