= Ariel Cañete =

Argentine golfer

Personal information
- Nationality: Argentina
- Born: 7 February 1975 (age 51) Santa Teresita, Argentina
- Height: 1.70 m (5 ft 7 in)
- Weight: 72 kg (159 lb; 11.3 st)
- Spouse: Lorena
- Children: 1

Career
- Sport: Golf
- Turned professional: 1995
- Current tour: Web.com Tour
- Former tours: European Tour; PGA Tour Latinoamérica
- Professional wins: 6

Number of wins by tour
- European Tour: 1
- Sunshine Tour: 1
- Other: 5

Best results in major championships
- Masters Tournament: DNP
- PGA Championship: DNP
- U.S. Open: DNP
- The Open Championship: T39: 2008

Achievements and awards
- PGA Tour Latinoamérica Order of Merit winner: 2012

Ariel Cañete (born 7 February 1975) is an Argentine professional golfer.

== Career ==
Cañete was born in Santa Teresita, Buenos Aires. He turned professional in 1995.

Having competed on the local Argentine Tour, and the Tour de las Américas earlier in his career, in 2002 Cañete began playing on the Challenge Tour, Europe's second tier development tour. He finished high enough in the end of season rankings in 2005 to gain a place on the main European Tour. He finished the 2006 season in 143rd position on the Order of Merit, which was not enough to secure full playing rights for 2007. Having played in two Challenge Tour events in Latin America, he was given an invite to the European Tour's Joburg Open, and he made the most of the opportunity by claiming the title, and with it a two-year exemption on the tour.

After his European Tour victory, Cañete also played events on the Sunshine Tour, Challenge Tour, and Asian Tour with little success; he had two top ten European Tour finishes from 2008 to 2011. He later found stability in Latin America and earned his first professional win since 2007 at the 2012 TransAmerican Power Products Open of PGA Tour Latinoamérica. Later in the 2012 season he picked up his second victory on PGA Tour Latinoamérica when he won the Olivos Golf Classic-Copa Personal. Cañete won the PGA Tour Latinoamérica Order of Merit in 2012 and earned promotion to the Web.com Tour for 2013; Cañete was fully exempt on the Web.com Tour as a result of winning the Order of Merit. It is his second time on the Web.com Tour; he played in seven events and made one cut (T35 at the Inland Empire Open) during the 1996 season of what was then the Nike Tour.

Cañete has played in one major, the 2008 Open Championship. He finished T39 after earning entry through a qualifying tournament.

== Amateur wins (3) ==
- 1992 South American Cup (Los Andes Cup)
- 1993 South American Cup (Los Andes Cup)
- 1994 South American Cup (Los Andes Cup)

== Professional wins (6) ==
=== European Tour wins (1) ===
No.	Date	Tournament	Winning score	Margin of victory	Runner-up
1	14 Jan 2007	Joburg Open^{1}	−19 (66-68-65-67=266)	2 strokes	(South Africa) Andrew McLardy

^{1}Co-sanctioned by the Sunshine Tour

=== PGA Tour Latinoamérica wins (2) ===
No.	Date	Tournament	Winning score	Margin of victory	Runner(s)-up
1	16 Sep 2012	TransAmerican Power Products Open	−18 (68-67-67-68=270)	2 strokes	(Argentina) Tommy Cocha
2	19 Dec 2012	Olivos Golf Classic-Copa Personal	−9 (71-70-67-67=275)	2 strokes	(Argentina) Clodomiro Carranza, (Argentina) José Cóceres

=== TPG Tour wins (1) ===
No.	Date	Tournament	Winning score	Margin of victory	Runner-up
1	11 Mar 2012	Abierto Norpatagónico	−8 (63-70-69=202)	4 strokes	(Argentina) Lucas Juncos

=== Other wins (2) ===
- 2002 Norpatagonico Open (Argentina)
- 2003 Center Open (Argentina)

== Results in major championships ==
Tournament	2008
The Open Championship	T39

Note: Cañete only played in The Open Championship.
"T" = tied

== Team appearances ==
Amateur

- Eisenhower Trophy (representing Argentina): 1994

== See also ==
- 2005 Challenge Tour graduates
