= 2014 PGA Tour Latinoamérica =

Golf tour season

2014 PGA Tour Latinoamérica season
- Duration: February 20, 2014 – December 7, 2014
- Number of official events: 17
- Most wins: (Argentina) Julián Etulain (2) (United States) Tyler McCumber (2)
- Order of Merit: (Argentina) Julián Etulain

The 2014 PGA Tour Latinoamérica was the third season of PGA Tour Latinoamérica, the main professional golf tour in Latin America, operated and run by the PGA Tour.

== Schedule changes ==
The number of tournaments increased from 14 to 18. Events that were added to the schedule included; the Stella Artois Open, Lexus Panama Classic, Ecuador Open, TransAmerican Power Products CRV Mazatlán Open and the Bridgestone America's Golf Cup. The Puerto Rico Classic was dropped from the schedule having previously been played in both the 2012 and 2013 seasons.

== Schedule ==
The following table lists official events during the 2014 season.

Date	Tournament	Host country	Purse (US$)	Winner (Note: The number in parentheses after each winner's name is the number of PGA Tour Latinoamérica events they had won up to and including that tournament. It is rare for someone to accumulate many wins on the PGA Tour Latinoamérica as success at this level usually leads to promotion to the Web.com Tour.)	OWGR points
Feb 23	Arturo Calle Colombian Open	Colombia	150,000	(Colombia) David Vanegas (1)	6
Mar 23	TransAmerican Power Products CRV Open	Mexico	150,000	(Colombia) Marcelo Rozo (2)	6
Mar 30	Stella Artois Open	Guatemala	150,000	(Mexico) Armando Favela (1)	6
Apr 6	Mundo Maya Open	Mexico	150,000	(United States) Daniel Mazziotta (1)	6
Apr 20	Abierto del Centro	Argentina	150,000	(United States) William Kropp (1)	6
Apr 27	Roberto De Vicenzo Invitational Copa NEC	Uruguay	150,000	(United States) Ty Capps (1)	6
May 18	Dominican Republic Open	Dominican Republic	150,000	(United States) Michael Buttacavoli (1)	6
May 25	Lexus Panama Classic	Panama	150,000	(Argentina) Julián Etulain (2)	6
Sep 28	Ecuador Open	Ecuador	150,000	(United States) Tyler McCumber (1)	6
Oct 5	Arturo Calle Colombian Classic	Colombia	150,000	(United States) Nicholas Lindheim (1)	6
Oct 12	TransAmerican Power Products CRV Mazatlán Open	Mexico	150,000	(United States) Tyler McCumber (2)	6
Oct 19	TransAmerican Power Products CRV Mexico Open	Mexico	150,000	(Colombia) Óscar David Álvarez (1)	6
Nov 2	Lexus Peru Open	Peru	150,000	(Argentina) Julián Etulain (3)	6
Nov 9	Aberto do Brasil	Brazil	150,000	(Brazil) Rafael Becker (1)	6
Nov 16	Hyundai - BBVA Abierto de Chile	Chile	150,000	(Argentina) Jorge Fernández-Valdés (2)	6
Dec 1	Personal Classic	Argentina	150,000	(Argentina) Fabián Gómez (2)	6
Dec 7	Visa Open de Argentina	Argentina	150,000	(Argentina) Emiliano Grillo (1)	8

=== Unofficial events ===
The following events were sanctioned by the PGA Tour Latinoamérica, but did not carry official money, nor were wins official.

Date	Tournament	Host country	Purse ($)	Winners	OWGR points
Oct 26	Bridgestone America's Golf Cup	Argentina	600,000	(Argentina) Emilio Domínguez and (Argentina) Rafael Echenique	n/a

== Order of Merit ==
The Order of Merit was based on prize money won during the season, calculated in U.S. dollars. The top five players on the Order of Merit earned status to play on the 2015 Web.com Tour.

Position	Player	Prize money ($)
1	(Argentina) Julián Etulain	92,394
2	(Colombia) Marcelo Rozo	89,117
3	(United States) Tyler McCumber	86,164
4	(United States) Brad Hopfinger	68,719
5	(Argentina) Jorge Fernández-Valdés	67,523

== Developmental Series ==
2014 PGA Tour Latinoamérica Developmental Series season
- Duration: 8 January 2014 – 18 January 2015
- Number of official events: 12
- Dev Series Final: (Colombia) Jesús Rivas

The 2014 PGA Tour Latinoamérica Developmental Series was the second season of the PGA Tour Latinoamérica Developmental Series, the official development tour to the PGA Tour Latinoamérica between 2013 and 2023.

=== Schedule ===
The following table lists official events during the 2014 season.

Date	Tournament	Host country	Purse	Winner (Note: The number in parentheses after each winner's name is the number of PGA Tour Latinoamérica Developmental Series events they had won up to and including that tournament. As most Developmental Series events are incorporated from regional tour schedules, details of these wins are displayed there instead.)	Main tour (Note: COL − Colombian Tour; TPG − TPG Tour.)
Jan 11	Abierto del Sur	Argentina	Arg$315,000	(Argentina) Nelson Ledesma	TPG
Apr 6	Abierto de Golf Copa Ciudad de Barranquilla	Colombia	Col$90,000,000	(Colombia) Álvaro Pinedo	COL
Apr 12	Abierto Norpatagónico	Argentina	Arg$400,000	(Argentina) Sebastián Saavedra	TPG
May 31	Venezuela Open	Venezuela	US$40,000	(Venezuela) Diego Larrazábal (1)	
Jul 13	Abierto del Club Campestre de Bucaramanga	Colombia	Col$90,000,000	(Colombia) Santiago Rivas	COL
Aug 23	CBG Pro Tour Porto Alegre	Brazil	US$50,000	(Brazil) Rafael Becker (1)	
Sep 14	Copa Samsung Carlos Franco Invitational	Paraguay	US$40,000	(Argentina) Andrés Romero	TPG
Sep 21	Bolivia Open Mitsuba	Bolivia	US$50,000	(Bolivia) Sebastian MacLean (1)	
Sep 28	Abierto de Barquisimeto	Venezuela	US$40,000	(Venezuela) José Daniel Ortega (1)	
Oct 26	Samsung Open	Peru	US$50,000	(Argentina) Francisco Bidé (1)	
Nov 23	Abierto del Litoral	Argentina	Arg$425,000	(Argentina) Miguel Ángel Carballo	TPG
Jan 18	Copa Mitad del Mundo Dev Series Final	Ecuador	US$50,000	(Colombia) Jesús Rivas (1)	

=== Dev Series Final ===
The Dev Series Final was made up of the top-five finishers of each tournament during the season. The top five finishers in the Dev Series Final earned status to play on the 2015 PGA Tour Latinoamérica.

Place	Player	Score	To par
1	(Colombia) Jesús Rivas	276	−8
2	(United States) Sean McNamara	277	−7
T3	(Colombia) José Manuel Garrido	278	−6
T3	(Argentina) Luciano Giometti	278	−6
T3	(Argentina) Rafael Gómez	278	−6

== See also ==
- 2014 PGA Tour Canada
- 2014 PGA Tour China
