= Quito Open (golf) =

Kia Open
Tournament information
- Location: Quito, Ecuador
- Established: 2017
- Courses: Quito Tennis and Golf Club
- Par: 72
- Length: 7,150 yards (6,540 m)
- Tours: PGA Tour Americas; PGA Tour Latinoamérica
- Format: Stroke play
- Prize fund: US$225,000
- Month played: May

Tournament record score
- Aggregate: 266 Augusto Núñez (2019); 266 Manav Shah (2022)
- To par: −22 as above

Current champion
- (United States) Jay Card III

Final champion
- Location in Ecuador

The Quito Open is a men's professional golf tournament held in Ecuador. The tournament was inaugurated as an event on the PGA Tour Latinoamérica in 2017, continuing from the Ecuador Open.

== Winners ==
| Year | Tour (Note: PGATAM − PGA Tour Americas; PGATLA − PGA Tour Latinoamérica.) | Winner | Score | To par | Margin of victory | Runner(s)-up | Ref. |
Kia Open
| 2025 | PGATAM | (United States) Jay Card III | 200 (Note: Shortened to 54 holes due to weather.) | −16 | 1 stroke | (Colombia) Ricardo Celia (United States) Jake Staiano | |
| 2024 | PGATAM | (United States) Thomas Longbella | 200 | −16 | 1 stroke | (United States) Gunn Yang | |
| 2023 | PGATLA | (Finland) Toni Hakula | 272 | −16 | 1 stroke | (Argentina) Julián Etulain | |
Quito Open
| 2022 | PGATLA | (United States) Manav Shah | 266 | −22 | 2 strokes | (United States) Mitchell Meissner (United States) Joel Thelen | |
Banco del Pacifico Open
| 2021 | PGATLA | (United States) Conner Godsey | 271 | −17 | Playoff | (Canada) Drew Nesbitt | |
| 2020 | PGATLA | No tournament due to the COVID-19 pandemic | | | | | |
| 2019 | PGATLA | (Argentina) Augusto Núñez | 266 | −22 | 6 strokes | (Argentina) Clodomiro Carranza | |
Quito Open
| 2018 | PGATLA | (Chile) Horacio León | 276 | −8 | 1 stroke | (Canada) Blair Hamilton | |
| 2017 | PGATLA | (United States) Curtis Yonke | 270 | −14 | 2 strokes | (Guatemala) José Toledo | |
