= Buenaventura Classic =

Tournament information
- Location: Río Hato, Panama
- Established: 2014
- Course: Buenaventura Golf Club
- Par: 72
- Length: 7,324 yards (6,697 m)
- Tour: PGA Tour Latinoamérica
- Format: Stroke play
- Prize fund: US$175,000
- Month played: March
- Final year: 2019

Tournament record score
- Aggregate: 271 Julián Etulain (2014)
- To par: −17 as above

Final champion
- (United States) Jared Wolfe
- Location in Panama

The Buenaventura Classic was a men's professional golf tournament held in Panama on PGA Tour Latinoamérica. The tournament was first held in 2014 on the Nicklaus Design Buenaventura Golf Club, the inaugural winner was Julián Etulain.

== Winners ==
Year	Winner	Score	To par	Margin of victory	Runner(s)-up	Ref.
Buenaventura Classic
2019	(United States) Jared Wolfe	275	−13	5 strokes	(United States) Mitchell Meissner (Chile) Mito Pereira (Australia) Ryan Ruffels	
Lexus Panama Classic
2017–18: No tournament
2016	(United States) Derek Rende	276	−12	1 stroke	(Argentina) Emilio Domínguez	
2015	(Mexico) Rodolfo Cazaubón	276	−12	2 strokes	(Spain) Samuel Del Val (United States) Ethan Tracy	
2014	(Argentina) Julián Etulain	271	−17	2 strokes	(Argentina) Gato Zarlenga	
