= Brandon Matthews =

American professional golfer (born 1994)

Personal information
- Full name: Brandon Michael Matthews
- Nationality: United States
- Born: July 27, 1994 (age 32) Dupont, Pennsylvania, U.S.
- Height: 6 ft 4 in (1.93 m)
- Weight: 210 lb (95 kg; 15 st)

Career
- Sport: Golf
- College: Temple University
- Turned professional: 2016
- Current tour: PGA Tour
- Former tours: Korn Ferry Tour; PGA Tour Latinoamérica
- Professional wins: 6

Number of wins by tour
- Korn Ferry Tour: 1
- Other: 5

Best results in major championships
- Masters Tournament: DNP
- PGA Championship: DNP
- U.S. Open: 60th: 2022
- The Open Championship: DNP

Achievements and awards
- PGA Tour Latinoamérica Order of Merit winner: 2020–21

Brandon Michael Matthews (born July 27, 1994) is an American professional golfer from Dupont, Pennsylvania. He has won on the Korn Ferry Tour and played on the PGA Tour, but came to prominence on the PGA Tour Latinoamérica for his gesture after losing a 2019 event.

== Amateur career ==
Matthews attended Pittston Area High School and played on their golf team. He was the 2010 PIAA Boys' Golf State champion. In 2011 Matthews was the Golf Association of Philadelphia Junior Boys champion.

Matthews played college golf at Temple University beginning in 2012. He tied the school record for career tournament titles, matching Geoffrey Sisk's mark of eight set back in 1986.

In 2014 Matthews was the Dixie Amateur champion.

== Professional career ==
Matthews turned professional in October 2016. He finished tied for ninth place in the Mexican, qualifying for the 2017 PGA Tour Latinoamérica, earning his card for the 2017 season. Matthews had a successful start to his professional career, finishing tied for ninth place in his first professional tournament, the Avianca Colombia Open, and winning his second event, the Molino Cañuelas Championship.

Matthews enjoyed a successful, but "scary" 2017 season, overcoming an absence for a herniated disc and two bulging discs to earn advancement from the PGA Tour Latinoamérica to the Web.com Tour. Matthews earned that invitation to the Final Stage of Q School for the Web.com Tour after finishing his rookie campaign on the PGA Tour Latinoamérica. He finished within the top 45 earning conditional status on the Web.com Tour. Conditional status guaranteed him a spot in any and all of the first eight tournaments of the season.

Making enough cuts and earning enough cumulative money afforded him status for the entire year (2018) on the Web.com Tour. Matthews' best finish of the year came from the Nashville Golf Open, where he finished T7. He also finished T10 at the North Mississippi Classic. Matthews did not finish high enough in 2019 to retain his Korn Ferry Tour privileges, but retained his PGA Tour Latinoamérica card for 2020.

In November 2019, Matthews lost the Visa Open de Argentina title in a playoff after a fan with Down syndrome made a loud distracting noise. Matthews went on record absolving the fan of responsibility for his loss and gave him a signed glove. While the playoff loss in Argentina cost him entry into The 2020 Open (which was cancelled), the gesture earned Matthews a sponsor exemption into the 2020 Arnold Palmer Invitational on the PGA Tour.

Matthews returned to the PGA Tour Latinoamérica and won two events during the COVID-affected 2020-21 season. He finished the season leading the Order of Merit, earning a return to the Korn Ferry Tour, fully exempt for 2022. Matthews won his first Korn Ferry Tour event at the Astara Golf Championship and made the cut at the U.S. Open.

== Amateur wins ==
- 2011 Philadelphia Junior Championship
- 2012 Silver Cross Award, Hartford Hawk Invitational, Philadelphia Big 5 Invitational
- 2013 Princeton Invitational, Silver Cross Award, Barnabas Health Intercollegiate
- 2014 Temple Invitational, Dixie Amateur
- 2015 Furman Intercollegiate, Princeton Invitational

== Professional wins (6) ==
=== Korn Ferry Tour wins (1) ===
No.	Date	Tournament	Winning score	Margin of victory	Runners-up
1	Feb 13, 2022	Astara Golf Championship	−19 (67-65-66-66=264)	1 stroke	(United States) Ben Griffin, (United States) Ryan McCormick

=== PGA Tour Latinoamérica wins (3) ===
No.	Date	Tournament	Winning score	Margin of victory	Runner(s)-up
1	Mar 12, 2017	Molino Cañuelas Championship	−13 (68-70-65-72=275)	1 stroke	(Argentina) Matias Simaski, (United States) Jared Wolfe
2	Dec 20, 2020	Puerto Plata Open	−26 (65-65-63-65=258)	5 strokes	(United States) Jacob Bergeron
3	Jun 13, 2021	The Club at Weston Hills Open	−22 (63-68-68-67=266)	1 stroke	(United States) Sam Stevens

=== Other wins (2) ===
- 2013 Philadelphia Open Championship (as an amateur)
- 2015 Philadelphia Open Championship (as an amateur)

== Results in major championships ==
Tournament	2022
Masters Tournament	
PGA Championship	
U.S. Open	60
The Open Championship	

Did not play

== See also ==
- 2022 Korn Ferry Tour Finals graduates
