= Tommy Cocha =

Argentine professional golfer (born 1991)

Tomás Cocha
Personal information
- Nickname: Tommy
- Nationality: Argentina
- Born: 26 April 1991 (age 35) San Pedro de Jujuy, Argentina
- Height: 1.68 m (5 ft 6 in)
- Weight: 54 kg (119 lb; 8.5 st)

Career
- Sport: Golf
- Turned professional: 2010
- Current tour: PGA Tour Latinoamérica
- Former tours: Web.com Tour; Tour de las Américas
- Professional wins: 4
Medal record
Pan American Games
Silver medal – second place	2015 Toronto	Individual
Bronze medal – third place	2015 Toronto	Mixed team
South American Games
Gold medal – first place	2022 Asunción	Mixed team

Tomás "Tommy" Cocha (born 26 April 1991) is an Argentine professional golfer who currently plays on PGA Tour Latinoamérica having previously played on the Web.com Tour and the Tour de las Américas. Cocha won the silver (men's individual) and bronze medal (mixed team) at the 2015 Pan American Games in Toronto, Canada.

== Amateur career ==
As a junior, Cocha was part of the winning Argentinian team at the 2009 Toyota Junior Golf World Cup in Japan alongside Jorge Fernández-Valdés. As an amateur, Cocha also won the 2009 South American Match Play Championship and the 2010 South American Medal Play Championship.

== Professional career ==
Cocha turned professional in 2010 and initially played on the Tour de las Américas in South America, he played his first PGA Tour event at the 2011 Mayakoba Golf Classic in Mexico.

In 2012, Cocha joined PGA Tour Latinoamérica and achieved his first win as a professional at the 2012 Mundo Maya Open in the tour's inaugural event. This win along with several other strong finishes lead to a 5th-place finish on the PGA Tour Latinoamérica Order of Merit for 2012, which earned Cocha his playing rights on the Web.com Tour for 2013.

In 2013, Cocha had a poor season on the Web.com Tour, only making two cuts in twelve starts. In 2014, Cocha rejoined PGA Tour Latinoamérica and began to regain some form with a runner-up finish at the Roberto De Vicenzo Invitational Copa NEC, a fourth at the Personal Classic, a fifth at the Colombian Classic and a seventh at the Abierto de Chile. He also finished second at The Great Waterway Classic and seventh at the Wildfire Invitational to end 28th on the PGA Tour Canada money list.

Cocha's second win on PGA Tour Latinoamérica came in the second event of the 2015 season at the Mazatlán Open. His score of 271 set the tournament record for the lowest aggregate score. Cocha made it back-to-back wins on PGA Tour Latinoamérica by winning the Abierto del Centro in the next event, in doing so this was Cocha's third win on the tour, equaling the record held by Julián Etulain.

== Amateur wins ==
- 2009 South American Match Play Championship
- 2010 South American Medal Play Championship.

== Professional wins (4) ==
=== PGA Tour Latinoamérica wins (4) ===
No.	Date	Tournament	Winning score	Margin of victory	Runner(s)-up
1	8 Sep 2012	Mundo Maya Open	−22 (68-64-66-68=266)	5 strokes	(Mexico) Óscar Fraustro
2	29 Mar 2015	Mazatlán Open	−17 (67-68-67-69=271)	5 strokes	(Colombia) Óscar David Álvarez, (Colombia) Andrés Echavarría
3	19 Apr 2015	Abierto del Centro	−9 (70-67-68-70=275)	4 strokes	(Argentina) Ángel Cabrera, (United States) Steven Fox
4	12 Jun 2022	Fortox Colombia Classic	−22 (67-64-62-65=258)	Playoff	(Mexico) Isidro Benítez

== Team appearances ==
Amateur

- Toyota Junior Golf World Cup (representing Argentina): 2009 (winners)
- Eisenhower Trophy (representing Argentina): 2010
