= 2022 PGA Tour Latinoamérica =

Golf tour season

2022 PGA Tour Latinoamérica season
- Duration: December 2, 2021 – June 26, 2022
- Number of official events: 12
- Order of Merit: (United States) Mitchell Meissner

The 2022 PGA Tour Latinoamérica was the tenth season of PGA Tour Latinoamérica, the main professional golf tour in Latin America, operated and run by the PGA Tour.

== Changes for 2022 ==
Following a disrupted 2020–21 season due to the COVID-19 pandemic, the tour announced 12 events for the 2022 season.

=== Order of Merit name change ===
It was the first season in which the Order of Merit was rebranded as the Totalplay Cup.

== Schedule ==
The following table lists official events during the 2022 season.

Date	Tournament	Host country	Purse (US$)	Winner (Note: The number in parentheses after each winner's name is the number of PGA Tour Latinoamérica events they had won up to and including that tournament. It is rare for someone to accumulate many wins on PGA Tour Latinoamérica as success at this level usually leads to promotion to the Korn Ferry Tour.)	OWGR points
Dec 5	Visa Open de Argentina	Argentina	175,000	(Argentina) Jorge Fernández-Valdés (4)	6
Dec 12	Scotia Wealth Management Chile Open	Chile	175,000	(Argentina) Alan Wagner (2)	6
Feb 20	Estrella del Mar Open	Mexico	175,000	(United States) Matt Ryan (1)	6
Mar 27	Termas de Río Hondo Invitational	Argentina	175,000	(United States) Kevin Velo (1)	6
Apr 3	Abierto del Centro	Argentina	175,000	(Argentina) Alejandro Tosti (2)	6
Apr 24	JHSF Aberto do Brasil	Brazil	175,000	(Argentina) Jaime López Rivarola (1)	6
May 1	Diners Club Peru Open	Peru	175,000	(Guatemala) José Toledo (2)	6
May 8	Quito Open	Ecuador	175,000	(United States) Manav Shah (1)	6
May 29	Jalisco Open GDL	Mexico	175,000	(Mexico) José de Jesús Rodríguez (5)	6
Jun 5	Volvo Golf Championship	Colombia	175,000	(Chile) Cristóbal del Solar (3)	6
Jun 12	Fortox Colombia Classic	Colombia	175,000	(Argentina) Tommy Cocha (4)	6
Jun 26	Bupa Tour Championship	Mexico	175,000	(Argentina) Jesús Montenegro (1)	6

== Order of Merit ==
The Order of Merit was titled as the Totalplay Cup and was based on tournament results during the season, calculated using a points-based system. The top five players on the Order of Merit earned status to play on the 2023 Korn Ferry Tour.

Position	Player	Points
1	(United States) Mitchell Meissner	1,528
2	(Chile) Cristóbal del Solar	1,377
3	(Argentina) Jorge Fernández-Valdés	1,262
4	(United States) Kevin Velo	1,169
5	(Argentina) Alejandro Tosti	1,034

== Developmental Series ==
2021–22 PGA Tour Latinoamérica Developmental Series season
- Duration: October 27, 2021 – July 17, 2022
- Number of official events: 14
- Dev Series Final: (United States) Josh Goldenberg

The 2021–22 PGA Tour Latinoamérica Developmental Series was the ninth season of the PGA Tour Latinoamérica Developmental Series, the official development tour to PGA Tour Latinoamérica between 2013 and 2023.

=== Schedule ===
The following table lists official events during the 2021–22 season.

Date	Tournament	Host country	Purse	Winner (Note: The number in parentheses after each winner's name is the number of PGA Tour Latinoamérica Developmental Series events they had won up to and including that tournament. As most Developmental Series events are incorporated from regional tour schedules, details of these wins are displayed there instead.)	Main tour (Note: CHL − Chilean Tour; GGPM − Gira de Golf Profesional Mexicana; TPG − TPG Tour.)
Oct 30	Etapa 6	Mexico	Mex$1,600,000	(Venezuela) Manuel Torres	GGPM
Dec 18	Abierto del Litoral	Argentina	Arg$5,000,000	(Argentina) Martín Contini	TPG
Dec 19	Etapa 7	Mexico	Mex$1,600,000	(Mexico) Aarón Terrazas	GGPM
Feb 12	El Campanario Classic	Mexico	Mex$1,600,000	(Mexico) Gonzalo Rubio	GGPM
Mar 12	Copa Prissa	Mexico	Mex$1,600,000	(Mexico) Isidro Benítez	GGPM
Mar 13	Abierto de San Luis	Argentina	Arg$5,000,000	(Argentina) Félix Córdoba	TPG
Apr 10	Abierto Norpatagónico	Argentina	Arg$3,000,000	(Argentina) Andrés Gallegos	TPG
Apr 24	Abierto de Golf Los Lirios	Chile	CLP$25,000,000	(Chile) Felipe Aguilar	CHL
Apr 24	Etapa 10	Mexico	Mex$1,600,000	(Mexico) Sebastián Vázquez	GGPM
Apr 30	Venezuela Open	Venezuela	US$50,000	(Venezuela) Virgilio Paz (a) (1)	
May 14	Abierto Roberto De Vicenzo	Argentina	Arg$3,000,000	(Argentina) César Costilla	TPG
Jun 18	Abierto de Termas Río Hondo	Argentina	Arg$4,500,000	(Argentina) Clodomiro Carranza	TPG
Jun 19	Etapa Final	Mexico	Mex$3,000,000	(Mexico) José de Jesús Rodríguez	GGPM
Jul 17	Dev Series Final	Mexico	US$40,000	(United States) Josh Goldenberg (1)	

=== Dev Series Final ===
The Dev Series Final was made up of the top-five finishers of each tournament during the season. The top five finishers in the Dev Series Final earned status to play on the 2023 PGA Tour Latinoamérica.

Place	Player	Score	To par
1	(United States) Josh Goldenberg	65-68-67-67=267	−21
2	(New Zealand) Charlie Hillier	71-66-67-66=270	−18
T3	(United States) Andrew Alligood	70-69-67-65=271	−17
T3	(Peru) Luis Fernando Barco	69-69-63-70=271	−17
T3	(United States) Brax McCarthy	66-67-71-67=271	−17

== See also ==
- 2022 PGA Tour Canada
