= 2013 PGA Tour Latinoamérica =

Golf tour season

2013 PGA Tour Latinoamérica season
- Duration: April 18, 2013 – November 24, 2013
- Number of official events: 14
- Most wins: (United States) Ryan Blaum (2) (United States) Timothy O'Neal (2) (Mexico) José de Jesús Rodríguez (2)
- Order of Merit: (United States) Ryan Blaum

The 2013 PGA Tour Latinoamérica, titled as the 2013 NEC Series-PGA Tour Latinoamérica for sponsorship reasons, was the second season of PGA Tour Latinoamérica, the main professional golf tour in Latin America, operated and run by the PGA Tour.

== Changes for 2013 ==
The 2013 season was the first full season on the tour with the 2012 season having only operated for four months in 2012. The 2013 schedule was divided into two distinct swings, the first with events played from March through May, followed by the remainder of events in the October through December. The number of events increased from 11 to 14 and new events for the 2013 season included the Abierto Mexicano de Golf, Abierto del Centro and Abierto de Chile.

It was also the first season in which the Developmental Series was introduced.

== NEC title sponsorship ==
In April, it was announced that the tour had signed a title sponsorship agreement with NEC, being renamed as the NEC Series-PGA Tour Latinoamérica.

== Schedule ==
The following table lists official events during the 2013 season.

Date	Tournament	Host country	Purse (US$)	Winner (Note: The number in parentheses after each winner's name is the number of PGA Tour Latinoamérica events they had won up to and including that tournament. It is rare for someone to accumulate many wins on the PGA Tour Latinoamérica as success at this level usually leads to promotion to the Web.com Tour.)	OWGR points
Mar 17	Abierto Mexicano de Golf	Mexico	150,000	(United States) Ted Purdy (1)	6
Mar 24	TransAmerican Power Products CRV Open	Mexico	150,000	(Colombia) Manuel Villegas (1)	6
Apr 21	Abierto del Centro	Argentina	150,000	(Argentina) Ángel Cabrera (2)	8
Apr 28	Roberto De Vicenzo Invitational Copa NEC	Uruguay	150,000	(Mexico) José de Jesús Rodríguez (1)	6
May 5	Arturo Calle Colombian Open	Colombia	150,000	(United States) Timothy O'Neal (1)	6
May 19	Mundo Maya Open	Mexico	150,000	(Argentina) Jorge Fernández-Valdés (1)	6
Jun 1	Dominican Republic Open	Dominican Republic	150,000	(United States) Ryan Blaum (1)	6
Oct 13	Puerto Rico Classic	Puerto Rico	150,000	(United States) Ryan Sullivan (1)	6
Oct 20	Aberto do Brasil	Brazil	150,000	(United States) Ryan Blaum (2)	6
Nov 3	Arturo Calle Colombian Classic	Colombia	150,000	(Mexico) José de Jesús Rodríguez (2)	6
Nov 10	Lexus Peru Open	Peru	150,000	(Argentina) Julián Etulain (1)	6
Nov 24	Abierto de Chile	Chile	150,000	(United States) Timothy O'Neal (2)	6
Dec 1	Personal Classic	Argentina	150,000	(Argentina) Fabián Gómez (1)	6
Dec 8	Visa Open de Argentina	Argentina	150,000	(Colombia) Marcelo Rozo (1)	8

== Order of Merit ==
The Order of Merit was based on prize money won during the season, calculated in U.S. dollars. The top five players on the Order of Merit earned status to play on the 2014 Web.com Tour.

Position	Player	Prize money ($)
1	(United States) Ryan Blaum	99,135
2	(Mexico) José de Jesús Rodríguez	98,383
3	(United States) Timothy O'Neal	90,015
4	(Argentina) Jorge Fernández-Valdés	65,178
5	(Colombia) Manuel Villegas	60,671

== Developmental Series ==
2013 PGA Tour Latinoamérica Developmental Series season
- Duration: 4 April 2013 – 21 December 2013
- Number of official events: 12
- Dev Series Final: (Brazil) Felipe Navarro

The 2013 PGA Tour Latinoamérica Developmental Series was the inaugural season of the PGA Tour Latinoamérica Developmental Series, the official development tour to the PGA Tour Latinoamérica between 2013 and 2023.

=== Schedule ===
The following table lists official events during the 2013 season.

Date	Tournament	Host country	Purse	Winner (Note: The number in parentheses after each winner's name is the number of PGA Tour Latinoamérica Developmental Series events they had won up to and including that tournament. As most Developmental Series events are incorporated from regional tour schedules, details of these wins are displayed there instead.)	Main tour (Note: CHL − Chilean Tour; COL − Colombian Tour; TPG − TPG Tour.)
Apr 7	Abierto Los Lirios	Chile	US$50,000	(Argentina) Mauricio Molina	CHL
Sep 8	Abierto del Club Campestre Farallones	Colombia	Col$90,000,000	(Colombia) Andrés Echavarría	COL
Sep 14	Copa Clube de Campo São Paulo	Brazil	US$50,000	(Brazil) Philippe Gasnier (1)	
Oct 13	San Eliseo Copa Gangoni	Argentina	Arg$300,000	(Argentina) Miguel Guzmán	TPG
Oct 20	Abierto del Club Serrezuela	Colombia	Col$90,000,000	(Colombia) José Manuel Garrido	COL
Oct 27	Abierto Internacional de Golf Hacienda de Chicureo	Chile	CLP$25,000,000	(Argentina) Mauricio Molina	CHL
Nov 17	Venezuela National Championship	Venezuela	US$50,000	(Venezuela) Alejandro Garmendia (1)	
Nov 24	Abierto del Litoral	Argentina	Arg$300,000	(Argentina) Ricardo González	TPG
Nov 30	Abierto Sambil	Venezuela	US$50,000	(Venezuela) Otto Solís (1)	
Dec 14	Ángel Cabrera Classic	Argentina	Arg$300,000	(Argentina) Ángel Cabrera	TPG
Dec 21	Copa Samsung Dev Series Final	Peru	US$50,000	(Brazil) Felipe Navarro (1)	

=== Dev Series Final ===
The Dev Series Final was made up of the top-five finishers of each tournament during the season. The top five finishers in the Dev Series Final earned status to play on the 2014 PGA Tour Latinoamérica.

Place	Player	Score	To par
1	(Brazil) Felipe Navarro	282	−6
2	(Colombia) Diego Vanegas	283	−5
3	(Paraguay) Marco Ruiz	284	−4
4	(Venezuela) Otto Solís	285	−3
5	(Brazil) Rafael Becker	286	−2

== See also ==
- 2013 PGA Tour Canada
