= Toni Hakula =

Finnish professional golfer (born 1991)

Personal information
- Nationality: Finland
- Born: 27 September 1991 (age 35) Espoo, Finland
- Height: 5 ft 10 in (178 cm)
- Weight: 165 lb (75 kg)

Career
- Sport: Golf
- College: University of Texas at Austin
- Turned professional: 2014
- Current tour: PGA Tour Americas
- Former tours: PGA Tour Canada; PGA Tour Latinoamérica
- Professional wins: 3

Achievements and awards
- Finnish Junior Golfer of the Year: 2009
- Big 12 Newcomer of the Year: 2011

Toni Hakula (born 27 September 1991) is a Finnish professional golfer. He has three victories in PGA Tour-organized third-tier tours in Mexico, Ecuador and the United States. As an amateur, he won the 2012 NCAA Championship with Texas and was runner-up at The Amateur Championship in 2013.

== Early life and amateur career ==
Hakula was born in Espoo, Finland, and started playing golf when he was four years old. As an amateur, Hakula pulled off two runner-up finishes on the Nordic Golf League, at the 2008 Visma Masters, two strokes behind Magnus Persson Atlevi and again at the 2010 Willis Masters. He was competitive at the 2008 Junior Players Championship at TPC Sawgrass in Florida and finished top-20.

Between 2007 and 2013, Hakula represented Finland in international team competitions, including four European Amateur Team Championships and twice at the World Amateur Team Championship for the Eisenhower Trophy. He was runner-up individually in strokeplay at the 2008 European Boys' Team Championship, one stroke behind Lucas Bjerregaard. In 2009, he played for Europe in the Jacques Léglise Trophy, as they defeated Great Britain & Ireland 14 1/2–9 1/2 at the Ganton Golf Club.

Hakula attended the University of Texas at Austin from 2010 to 2014 and played with the Texas Longhorns men's golf team. As a freshman, he was named Big 12 Newcomer of the Year. In 2012, he helped Texas win the 2012 NCAA Championship alongside a three later PGA Tour players, Jordan Spieth, Dylan Frittelli and Kramer Hickok, contributing a 2–1–0 record.

In 2013, Hakula was runner-up at The Amateur Championship at Royal Cinque Ports Golf Club, losing the 36-hole final to Garrick Porteous by 6 and 5. He lost a six-hole playoff against Kyle Westermoreland at the Patriot All-America Invitational, and finished T-49th in the U.S. Amateur strokeplay, but lost in a playoff round to not qualify for the 64-player match play field.

He tied for 9th individually at the 2014 NCAA Division I men's golf championship, and was named to the 2014 Ben Hogan Award watch list.

== Professional career ==
Hakula turned professional in 2014 and joined the PGA Tour Canada in 2015. He played on the PGA Tour Latinoamérica between 2016 and 2023, where he won twice, in Mexico and Ecuador. He also won a tournament in the 2020 LocaliQ Series in Florida.

In 2024, he joined the newly created PGA Tour Americas.

== Personal life ==
His younger sister Anne also played golf at the University of Texas and is married to golfer Kramer Hickok.

== Amateur wins ==
- 2013 New Year's Invitational, Spirit International Amateur

== Professional wins (3) ==
=== PGA Tour Latinoamérica wins (2) ===
No.	Date	Tournament	Winning score	Margin of victory	Runner-up
1	10 Jun 2018	Bupa Match Play	7 and 6		(Argentina) Sebastián Saavedra
2	7 May 2023	Kia Open	−16 (64-76-65-67=272)	1 stroke	(Argentina) Julián Etulain

=== LocaliQ Series wins (1) ===
No.	Date	Tournament	Winning score	Margin of victory	Runner-up
1	2 Oct 2020	Challenge at Harbor Hills	−17 (66-64-63=193)	1 stroke	(Argentina) Julián Etulain

== Team appearances ==
Amateur

- European Boys' Team Championship (representing Finland): 2007, 2008, 2009
- European Amateur Team Championship (representing Finland): 2009, 2010, 2011, 2013
- Eisenhower Trophy (representing Finland): 2010, 2012
- Jacques Léglise Trophy (representing Continent of Europe): 2009 (winners)
