= Colombian Classic =

Men's professional golf tournament

Colombia Classic
Tournament information
- Location: Bucaramanga, Colombia
- Established: 2012
- Courses: Ruitoque Golf and Country Club
- Par: 72
- Length: 6,592 yards (6,028 m)
- Tour: PGA Tour Latinoamérica
- Format: Stroke play
- Prize fund: US$175,000
- Month played: May

Tournament record score
- Aggregate: 258 Tommy Cocha (2022); 258 Isidro Benítez (2022)
- To par: −22 as above

Current champion
- (United States) Walker Lee

Final champion
- Location in Colombia

The Colombian Classic is a men's professional golf tournament held in Colombia and has been part of the PGA Tour Latinoamérica schedule since 2012.

The tournament was first played on PGA Tour Latinoamérica from 26 November to 2 December 2012 as the "Arturo Calle Colombian Coffee Classic Presentado por Avianca" at Club Campestre de Cali. The inaugural winner of the event was Sebastián Fernández.

== Winners ==
| Year | Winner | Score | To par | Margin of victory | Runner(s)-up | Venue | Ref. |
Colombia Classic
| 2023 | (United States) Walker Lee | 261 | −19 | 1 stroke | (United States) Austin Hitt | Ruitoque | |
Fortox Colombia Classic
| 2022 | (Argentina) Tommy Cocha | 258 | −22 | Playoff | (Mexico) Isidro Benítez | Ruitoque | |
Holcim Colombia Classic
| 2021 | (United States) Sam Stevens | 273 | −11 | 1 stroke | (United States) Paul Imondi | Club Campestre de Bucaramanga | |
Colombia Classic
2017–2020: No tournament
| 2016 | (Colombia) Andrés Echavarría | 276 | −8 | 2 strokes | (England) Kelvin Day (Colombia) Daniel Zuluaga | Club Campestre de Cali | |
Volvo Colombian Classic
| 2015 | (Australia) Mitch Krywulycz | 270 | −10 | 1 stroke | (Colombia) Jaime Clavijo (Mexico) Sebastián Vázquez | Club Campestre El Rancho | |
Arturo Calle Colombian Classic
| 2014 | (United States) Nicholas Lindheim | 269 | −19 | 1 stroke | (United States) Brad Hopfinger (Colombia) Marcelo Rozo | Pueblo Viejo | |
| 2013 | (Mexico) José de Jesús Rodríguez | 270 | −14 | Playoff | (Colombia) Manuel Villegas | San Andrés | |
Arturo Calle Colombian Coffee Classic
| 2012 | (Argentina) Sebastián Fernández | 275 | −9 | Playoff | (Colombia) Jose Manuel Garrido | Club Campestre de Cali | |
