= Dominican Republic Open =

Golf tournament

Puerto Plata Open
Tournament information
- Location: Puerto Plata, Dominican Republic
- Established: 2004
- Course: Playa Dorada Golf Course
- Par: 72
- Length: 6,989 yards (6,391 m)
- Tours: PGA Tour Latinoamérica; Tour de las Américas
- Format: Stroke play
- Prize fund: US$175,000
- Month played: December
- Final year: 2020

Tournament record score
- Aggregate: 258 Brandon Matthews (2020)
- To par: −26 as above

Final champion
- (United States) Brandon Matthews
- Location in the Dominican Republic

The Dominican Republic Open (also known as The DR Open) was a men's professional golf tournament on PGA Tour Latinoamérica.

The event was originally hosted as a combined amateur stableford and professional stroke play competition by The Dominican Golf Federation in 2010 and 2011.

In 2012, the tournament was announced as an event on the inaugural PGA Tour Latinoamérica season and the focus of the event was shifted towards the professional stroke play, although the pro–am format was retained.

== Winners ==
Year	Tour (Note: PGATLA − PGA Tour Latinoamérica; TLA − Tour de las Américas.)	Winner	Score	To par	Margin of victory	Runner(s)-up	Venue	Ref.
Puerto Plata Open
2020	PGATLA	(United States) Brandon Matthews	258	−26	5 strokes	(United States) Jacob Bergeron	Playa Dorada	
2019	PGATLA	(Chile) Cristóbal del Solar	270	−14	1 stroke	(United States) Scott Wolfes	Playa Dorada	
Puerto Plata Dominican Republic Open
2018	PGATLA	(Argentina) Andrés Gallegos	262	−22	8 strokes	(United States) M. J. Maguire	Playa Dorada	
2017	PGATLA	(United States) Tee-K Kelly	263	−21	7 strokes	(Australia) Ryan Ruffels	Playa Dorada	
Casa de Campo Dominican Republic Open
2016	PGATLA	(United States) Timothy O'Neal	278	−10	4 strokes	(United States) Paul Apyan (Argentina) Rafael Echenique (Bolivia) Sebastian MacLean	Casa de Campo	
Dominican Republic Open
2015	PGATLA	(Mexico) Rodolfo Cazaubón	278	−10	3 strokes	(Colombia) Santiago Rivas (Brazil) Alexandre Rocha	Casa de Campo	
2014	PGATLA	(United States) Michael Buttacavoli	276	−12	Playoff	(United States) Rick Cochran III	Casa de Campo	
2013	PGATLA	(United States) Ryan Blaum	279	−9	2 strokes	(Argentina) Maximiliano Godoy	Cana Bay	
2012	PGATLA	(Mexico) Óscar Fraustro	278	−10	4 strokes	(Colombia) Marcelo Rozo	Cana Bay	
2005–2011: No tournament
American Express Dominican Republic Open
2004	TLA	(Puerto Rico) Wilfredo Morales	286	−2	1 stroke	(United States) Tim Conley (United States) Shannon Sykora	Casa de Campo	

== See also ==
- Open golf tournament
