= Ecuador Open (golf) =

Golf tournament

Kia Open de Ecuador
Tournament information
- Location: Quito, Ecuador
- Course: Quito Tenis y Golf Club
- Par: 72
- Length: 7,412 yards (6,778 m)
- Tours: PGA Tour Americas; PGA Tour Latinoamérica; South American Tour; PGA Tour Latinoamérica Developmental Series
- Format: Stroke play
- Prize fund: US$225,000
- Month played: May

Tournament record score
- Aggregate: 267 Jack Lundin (2026); 267 Joey Savoie (2026)
- To par: −21 as above

Current champion
- (Canada) Joey Savoie

Location map
- Location in Ecuador

The Ecuador Open (Spanish: Abierto de Ecuador) is a men's professional golf tournament held in Ecuador, currently played as part of the PGA Tour Americas schedule.

== Winners ==
Year	Tour (Note: PGATAM − PGA Tour Americas; PGATLA − PGA Tour Latinoamérica; PGATLADEV − PGA Tour Latinoamérica Developmental Series; SAM − South American Tour.)	Winner (Note: (a) – Amateur)	Score	To par	Margin of victory	Runner(s)-up	Ref.
Kia Open de Ecuador
2026	PGATAM	(Canada) Joey Savoie	267	−21	Playoff	(United States) Jack Lundin	
Abierto de Ecuador
2023–2025: No tournament
2022	PGATLADEV	(Ecuador) Juan Moncayo (2)	209	−7	Playoff	(Colombia) Juan Pablo Luna	
2020–2021: No tournament
2019	PGATLADEV	(Ecuador) José Andrés Miranda	202	−11	2 strokes	(Ecuador) Rafael Miranda Ponce	
2018	PGATLADEV	(Ecuador) Juan Moncayo (a)	202	−11	9 strokes	(Colombia) Jesús Amaya (Colombia) Diego Vargas	
2017: No tournament
Copa Diners Club International
2016	PGATLA	(United States) Nate Lashley	269	−15	2 strokes	(United States) Case Cochran (Australia) Ryan Ruffels	
All you need is Ecuador Open
2015	PGATLA	(Colombia) Ricardo Celia	275	−9	3 strokes	(United States) Ian Davis (United States) Timothy O'Neal	
Ecuador Open
2014	PGATLA	(United States) Tyler McCumber	275	−13	5 strokes	(Mexico) Mauricio Azcué (Australia) Mitch Krywulycz (Colombia) Marcelo Rozo (Guatemala) José Toledo	
1998–2013: No tournament
1997	SAM	(Argentina) Gustavo Rojas (2)					
1996	SAM	(Argentina) Gustavo Rojas	274	−14	2 strokes	(United States) Jeff Schmid	
1995	SAM	(Argentina) Fabián Montovia					
1994	SAM	(Argentina) Mauricio Molina					
1993	SAM	(Canada) Frank Edmonds					
1966–1992: No tournament
1965		(Argentina) Fidel de Luca					

== See also ==
- Open golf tournament

== See also ==
- Quito Open (golf)
