= 2020–21 PGA Tour Latinoamérica =

Golf tour season

2020–21 PGA Tour Latinoamérica season
- Duration: March 5, 2020 – July 25, 2021
- Number of official events: 8 (Note: A further twelve tournaments were scheduled but were postponed.)
- Most wins: (United States) Brandon Matthews (2)
- Order of Merit: (United States) Brandon Matthews

The 2020–21 PGA Tour Latinoamérica was the ninth season of PGA Tour Latinoamérica, the main professional golf tour in Latin America, operated and run by the PGA Tour.

== In-season changes ==
The season began in early March 2020 at the Estrella del Mar Open in Mexico. Soon after, the schedule was put on hold due to the COVID-19 pandemic, with all tournaments being postponed to mid-May.

With the season remaining suspended, the PGA Tour created an eight tournament LocaliQ Series based in the United States in which tour members, along with members of those of the cancelled 2020 PGA Tour Canada and 2020 PGA Tour China seasons, would be eligible to compete.

On October 1, 2020, the tour announced that the season would resume in December and run through to July 2021.

== Schedule ==
The following table lists official events during the 2020–21 season.

Date	Tournament	Host country	Purse (US$)	Winner (Note: The number in parentheses after each winner's name is the number of PGA Tour Latinoamérica events they had won up to and including that tournament. It is rare for someone to accumulate many wins on PGA Tour Latinoamérica as success at this level usually leads to promotion to the Korn Ferry Tour.)	OWGR points
Mar 8, 2020	Estrella del Mar Open	Mexico	175,000	(Brazil) Alexandre Rocha (2)	6
~~Mar 29, 2020~~	Buenos Aires Championship	Argentina	–	Postponed	–
~~Apr 5, 2020~~	Termas de Río Hondo Invitational	Argentina	–	Postponed	–
~~Apr 19, 2020~~	Abierto OSDE del Centro	Argentina	–	Postponed	–
~~Apr 25, 2020~~	Itau Abierto de Chile	Chile	–	Postponed	–
~~May 17, 2020~~	Banco del Pacifico Open	Ecuador	–	Postponed	–
~~May 24, 2020~~	Abierto Mexicano de Golf	Mexico	–	Postponed	–
~~May 31, 2020~~	Bupa Match Play	TBC	–	Postponed	–
~~Sep 6, 2020~~	Diners Club Peru Open	Peru	–	Postponed	–
~~Sep 13, 2020~~	Colombia Classic	Colombia	–	Postponed	–
~~Oct 4, 2020~~	PGA Tour Latinoamérica Tour Championship	TBC	–	Postponed	–
Dec 13, 2020	Shell Open	United States	175,000	(United States) M. J. Maguire (1)	6
Dec 20, 2020; ~~May 10, 2020~~	Puerto Plata Open	Dominican Republic	175,000	(United States) Brandon Matthews (2)	6
Mar 28, 2021	Abierto Mexicano de Golf	Mexico	175,000	(Mexico) Álvaro Ortiz (1)	6
Jun 13, 2021	The Club at Weston Hills Open	United States	175,000	(United States) Brandon Matthews (3)	6
Jun 20, 2021	Holcim Colombia Classic	Colombia	175,000	(United States) Sam Stevens (1)	6
Jun 27, 2021	Banco del Pacifico Open	Ecuador	175,000	(United States) Conner Godsey (1)	6
Jul 25, 2021	Bupa Championship	Mexico	175,000	(United States) Patrick Newcomb (2)	6

== Order of Merit ==
The Order of Merit was titled as the Points List and was based on tournament results during the season, calculated using a points-based system. The top five players on the Order of Merit earned status to play on the 2022 Korn Ferry Tour.

Position	Player	Points
1	(United States) Brandon Matthews	1,191
2	(United States) Sam Stevens	1,067
3	(United States) Conner Godsey	1,041
4	(Mexico) Álvaro Ortiz	888
5	(United States) M. J. Maguire	860

== Developmental Series ==
2020–21 PGA Tour Latinoamérica Developmental Series season
- Duration: 23 January 2020 – 10 October 2021
- Number of official events: 16
- Dev Series Final: (United States) Roland Massimino

The 2020–21 PGA Tour Latinoamérica Developmental Series was the eighth season of the PGA Tour Latinoamérica Developmental Series, the official development tour to PGA Tour Latinoamérica between 2013 and 2023.

=== Schedule ===
The following table lists official events during the 2020–21 season.

Date	Tournament	Host country	Purse	Winner (Note: The number in parentheses after each winner's name is the number of PGA Tour Latinoamérica Developmental Series events they had won up to and including that tournament. As most Developmental Series events are incorporated from regional tour schedules, details of these wins are displayed there instead.)	Main tour (Note: COL − Colombian Tour; GGPM − Gira de Golf Profesional Mexicana; TPG − TPG Tour.)
Jan 26, 2020	Abierto del Sur	Argentina	Arg$1,200,000	(Argentina) Jorge Fernández-Valdés	TPG
Mar 15, 2020	Abierto Norpatagónico	Argentina	Arg$1,200,000	(Argentina) Andrés Gallegos (Argentina) Ricardo González	TPG
Mar 15, 2020	Wipas Invitational	Mexico	Mex$1,600,000	(Mexico) Armando Favela	GGPM
Nov 29, 2020	Pro-Am Ventanas de San Miguel	Mexico	Mex$1,600,000	(Mexico) Sebastián Vázquez	GGPM
Jan 17, 2021	Copa Puro Sinaloa	Mexico	Mex$3,000,000	(Mexico) Rodolfo Cazaubón	GGPM
Feb 7, 2021	Abierto Buenos Aires Classic	Argentina	Arg$1,600,000	(Argentina) Andrés Gallegos	TPG
Mar 7, 2021	Copa Tequila Azulejos	Mexico	Mex$1,600,000	(Mexico) José de Jesús Rodríguez	GGPM
Mar 14, 2021	Allocco Classic	Argentina	Arg$1,600,000	(Argentina) Matías Simaski	TPG
Apr 3, 2021	Abierto OSDE del Centro	Argentina	Arg$3,500,000	(Argentina) César Costilla	TPG
Apr 24, 2021	Copa Prissa	Mexico	Mex$1,600,000	(Guatemala) José Toledo	GGPM
May 9, 2021	Copa Multimedios	Mexico	Mex$1,600,000	(Guatemala) José Toledo	GGPM
Jun 5, 2021	Amanali Classic	Mexico	Mex$1,600,000	(Mexico) José de Jesús Rodríguez	GGPM
Jul 4, 2021	Torneo Pro-Am	Mexico	Mex$1,600,000	(Guatemala) José Toledo	GGPM
Aug 1, 2021	Abierto de Colombia	Colombia	Col$200,000,000	(Colombia) Jesús Amaya	COL
Sep 4, 2021	Venezuela Open	Venezuela	US$50,000	(Colombia) Iván Camilo Ramírez (1)	
Oct 10, 2021	Dev Series Final	Mexico	US$40,000	(United States) Roland Massimino (1)	

=== Dev Series Final ===
The Dev Series Final was made up of the top-five finishers of each tournament during the season. The top five finishers in the Dev Series Final earned status to play on the 2022 PGA Tour Latinoamérica.

Place	Player	Score	To par
1	(United States) Roland Massimino	69-72-65-66=272	−16
2	(Argentina) Jaime López Rivarola	66-68-68-70=272	−16
3	(Mexico) José Narro	68-68-68-69=273	−15
4	(United States) Joel Thelen	69-73-63-69=274	−14
5	(Colombia) Iván Camilo Ramírez	70-67-68-70=275	−13

== See also ==
- 2020 PGA Tour Canada
- 2020 PGA Tour China
- 2021 PGA Tour Canada
