= LocaliQ Series =

Professional golf series

- Sport: Golf
- Founded: 2020
- Founder: PGA Tour
- First season: 2020
- Folded: 2020
- Country: Based in the United States
- Related competitions: PGA Tour Canada; PGA Tour China; PGA Tour Latinoamérica
- Website: https://www.pgatour.com/la/en/localiq-series.html

The LocaliQ Series, stylized as the LOCALiQ Series, was a one-off professional golf tour played in 2020, organized by the PGA Tour.

The series was announced following the cancellation of much of the PGA Tour's global development tours due to the COVID-19 pandemic. The tour is aimed at players who would have qualified to play on PGA Tour Canada, PGA Tour Latinoamérica and PGA Tour China in 2020, with places also available to players on the second-tier Korn Ferry Tour and sponsor invites. Originally called the XYZ Series, business marketing firm LocaliQ became the title sponsor.

The seven regular tournaments on the tour were contested over 54 holes of stroke play with 144 competitors, a cut line of 55 plus ties, and a minimum prize fund of US$100,000. The series finale was a limited-field event over 72 holes. The winner and the two leaders in the overall series points standings were awarded sponsor exemptions into one tournament on the 2020–21 PGA Tour. The series was awarded Official World Golf Ranking status, with four points for winners of 54-hole events and six for the 72-hole championship.

Bryson Nimmer finished top of the LocaliQ Series points standings after winning both of the first two tournaments and finishing as runner-up in the fourth; his prize was an invite to initially the RBC Canadian Open, but that was eliminated because of border restrictions; he was allowed entry into the Palmetto Championship, the one-off replacement event that replaced the RBC Canadian Open. David Pastore won the Series Championship, the circuits final event, to move into second place in the standings and was rewarded with an invite to the 2021 Barbasol Championship. As a result, Carson Young, who finished third in the standings, received the third PGA Tour invite, to the 2021 Puerto Rico Open.

With the final event being originally scheduled in The Bahamas, the Local iQ Series points competition was titled as the "Race to The Bahamas", with a tournament win being worth 500 points. The event ultimately was moved to TPC Sugarloaf in Duluth, Georgia.

The one-off tour resulted in the development of a United States–based third-tier tour, the Forme Tour, in 2021. Like the LOCALiQ Series, the Forme Tour also lasted one season in response to travel restrictions.

== 2020 season ==
2020 LocaliQ Series season
- Duration: August 4, 2020 – November 20, 2020
- Number of official events: 8
- Order of Merit: (United States) Bryson Nimmer

=== Schedule ===
The following table lists official events during the 2020 season.

Date	Tournament	Location	Purse (US$)	Winner (Note: The number in parentheses after each winner's name is the number of LocaliQ Series events they had won up to and including that tournament.)	OWGR points
Aug 7	Alpharetta Classic	Georgia	100,000	(United States) Bryson Nimmer (1)	4
Aug 13	Championship at Echelon Golf Club	Georgia	100,000	(United States) Bryson Nimmer (2)	4
Aug 28	Classic at Callaway Gardens	Georgia	100,000	(United States) Stoney Crouch (1)	4
Sep 3	Invitational at Auburn University Club	Alabama	100,000	(United States) Cooper Musselman (1)	4
Sep 25	Jacksonville Championship	Florida	100,000	(United States) Carson Young (1)	4
Oct 2	Challenge at Harbor Hills	Florida	100,000	(Finland) Toni Hakula (1)	4
Oct 9	Classic at the Club at Weston Hills	Florida	125,000	(United States) Justin Doeden (1)	4
Nov 20	LOCALiQ Series Championship	Georgia	150,000	(United States) David Pastore (1)	6

=== Order of Merit ===
The Order of Merit was titled as the Race to The Bahamas and was based on tournament results during the season, calculated using a points-based system.

Place	Player	Event								Total points	Tmts
Place	Player	1	2	3	4	5	6	7	8	Total points	Tmts
1	(United States) Bryson Nimmer	1st 500	1st 500	T14; 56	2nd 300	T11; 63	CUT; 0	•	T53; 7	1,426	7
2	(United States) David Pastore	T23; 35	T5; 105	T27; 26	T13; 54	T2; 245	T51; 8	CUT; 0	1st 600	1,072	8
3	(United States) Carson Young	T4; 123	T14; 56	56th 6	•	1st 500	T10; 64	T40; 15	T8; 83	845	7
4	(United States) Hayden Shieh	2nd 300	CUT; 0	2nd 300	CUT; 0	T21; 40	CUT; 0	T24; 35	T8; 83	757	8
5	(Finland) Toni Hakula	T46; 10	T5; 105	CUT; 0	CUT; 0	T15; 50	1st 500	T44; 11	T28; 32	707	8
6	(United States) Stoney Crouch	CUT; 0	T36; 18	1st 500	T23; 35	CUT; 0	CUT; 0	T54; 6	T13; 64	623	8
7	(United States) Justin Doeden	CUT; 0	T36; 18	CUT; 0	CUT; 0	T11; 63	CUT; 0	1st 500	T28; 32	612	8
8	(United States) Cooper Musselman	•	•	CUT; 0	1st 500	CUT; 0	T46; 10	CUT; 0	T13; 64	574	6
9	(United States) Alex Smalley	3rd 190	CUT; 0	T9; 70	T4; 123	•	T25; 30	T18; 44	T16; 54	510	7
10	(United States) Trace Crowe	•	•	•	T4; 123	CUT; 0	•	•	2nd 330	453	3

== See also ==
- 2019–20 PGA Tour
- 2020–21 Korn Ferry Tour
- 2020 PGA Tour Latinoamérica
- 2020 PGA Tour Canada
- 2020 PGA Tour China
