= 2022 TPG Tour =

Golf tour season

2022 TPG Tour season
- Duration: 10 February 2022 – 17 December 2022
- Number of official events: 12
- Most wins: (Argentina) Maximiliano Godoy (2)
- Order of Merit: (Argentina) Jorge Monroy

The 2022 TPG Tour was the 16th season of the TPG Tour, the main professional golf tour in Argentina since it was formed in 2007.

== Schedule ==
The following table lists official events during the 2022 season.

Date	Tournament	Location	Purse (Arg$)	Winner (Note: The number in brackets after each winner's name is the number of TPG Tour events they had won up to and including that tournament.)
12 Feb	Buenos Aires Classic	Buenos Aires	2,500,000	(Argentina) Santiago Bauni (2)
13 Mar	Abierto de San Luis	San Luis	5,000,000	(Argentina) Félix Córdoba (2)
18 Mar	Abierto del Oeste	Mendoza	2,000,000	(Argentina) Maximiliano Godoy (5)
10 Apr	Abierto Norpatagónico	Buenos Aires	3,000,000	(Argentina) Andrés Gallegos (3)
14 May	Abierto Roberto De Vicenzo	Buenos Aires	3,000,000	(Argentina) César Costilla (11)
18 Jun	Abierto Termas de Río Hondo	Santiago del Estero	4,500,000	(Argentina) Clodomiro Carranza (7)
3 Sep	Andrés Romero Invitational	Santiago del Estero	4,000,000	(Argentina) Leandro Marelli (4)
11 Sep	Abierto del Norte	Tucumán	4,500,000	(Argentina) Jorge Monroy (8)
22 Oct	Abierto de Rafaela	Santa Fe	3,000,000	(Argentina) Matías Simaski (2)
5 Nov	Abierto de Misiones	Misiones	4,500,000	(Argentina) Emilio Domínguez (6)
12 Nov	Abierto de San Vicente	Buenos Aires	3,000,000	(Argentina) Maximiliano Godoy (6)
17 Dec	Abierto del Litoral	Santa Fe	8,000,000	(Argentina) Alejandro Tosti (1)

== Order of Merit ==
The Order of Merit was based on tournament results during the season, calculated using a points-based system.

Position	Player	Points
1	(Argentina) Jorge Monroy	2,416,478
2	(Argentina) César Costilla	2,200,462
3	(Argentina) Clodomiro Carranza	1,946,642
4	(Argentina) Maximiliano Godoy	1,874,909
5	(Argentina) Emilio Domínguez	1,792,706

== See also ==
- 2021–22 PGA Tour Latinoamérica Developmental Series
- 2022–23 PGA Tour Latinoamérica Developmental Series
