= 2021 TPG Tour =

Golf tour season

2021 TPG Tour season
- Duration: 28 January 2021 – 8 January 2022
- Number of official events: 8
- Order of Merit: (Argentina) Martín Contini

The 2021 TPG Tour was the 15th season of the TPG Tour, the main professional golf tour in Argentina since it was formed in 2007.

== Schedule ==
The following table lists official events during the 2021 season.

Date	Tournament	Location	Purse (Arg$)	Winner (Note: The number in brackets after each winner's name is the number of TPG Tour events they had won up to and including that tournament.)
31 Jan	Gran Premio El Moro	Buenos Aires	800,000	(Argentina) Rafael Echenique (2)
7 Feb	Buenos Aires Classic	Buenos Aires	1,600,000	(Argentina) Andrés Gallegos (2)
14 Mar	Allocco Classic	San Luis	1,600,000	(Argentina) Matías Simaski (1)
3 Apr	Abierto OSDE del Centro	Córdoba	3,500,000	(Argentina) César Costilla (10)
5 Sep	Abierto del Norte	Tucumán	2,000,000	(Argentina) Augusto Núñez (2)
24 Oct	Abierto de San Vicente	Buenos Aires	900,000	(Argentina) Román Rébora (1)
18 Dec	Abierto del Litoral	Santa Fe	5,000,000	(Argentina) Martín Contini (1)
8 Jan	Abierto del Sur	Buenos Aires	3,000,000	(Argentina) Franco Romero (2)

== Order of Merit ==
The Order of Merit was based on tournament results during the season, calculated using a points-based system.

Position	Player	Points
1	(Argentina) Martín Contini	1,055,920
2	(Argentina) César Costilla	1,053,833
3	(Argentina) Andrés Gallegos	821,113
4	(Argentina) Rafael Echenique	794,490
5	(Argentina) Franco Romero	635,973

== See also ==
- 2020–21 PGA Tour Latinoamérica Developmental Series
- 2021–22 PGA Tour Latinoamérica Developmental Series
