= Augusto Núñez =

Argentine golfer

Personal information
- Full name: Augusto Martín Núñez
- Nationality: Argentina
- Born: 3 November 1992 (age 33) Yerba Buena, Tucumán, Argentina
- Height: 5 ft 10 in (1.78 m)
- Weight: 185 lb (84 kg; 13.2 st)

Career
- Sport: Golf
- Turned professional: 2012
- Current tour: PGA Tour
- Former tours: Korn Ferry Tour; PGA Tour Latinoamérica
- Professional wins: 14

Achievements and awards
- PGA Tour Latinoamérica Order of Merit winner: 2019

Augusto Martín Núñez (born 3 November 1992) is a professional golfer from Argentina. He is a member of the Korn Ferry Tour and previously played on the PGA Tour Latinoamérica.

== Career ==
Núñez won his first tournament on the PGA Tour Latinoamérica during the 2016 season at the Flor de Caña Open. He beat Emilio Puma Domínguez and Eric Steger in a playoff after finishing at 25 under par. The win put Núñez in first place in the Order of Merit for that season.

Núñez finished the 2016 PGA Tour Latinoamérica season in second place in the Order of Merit, earning him a place in the Web.com Tour for the 2017 season. His best performance was runner-up in the Corales Puntacana Resort and Club Championship, one stroke behind the winner.

== Professional wins (14) ==
=== PGA Tour Latinoamérica wins (3) ===
No.	Date	Tournament	Winning score	To par	Margin of victory	Runner(s)-up
1	4 Sep 2016	Flor de Caña Open	67-63-64-65=259	−25	1 stroke	(Argentina) Emilio Domínguez, (United States) Eric Steger
2	6 Oct 2019	Banco del Pacifico Open	68-67-64-67=266	−22	6 strokes	(Argentina) Clodomiro Carranza
3	8 Dec 2019	Shell Championship	66-66-69-70=271	−13	1 stroke	(United States) Jared Wolfe

=== TPG Tour wins (5) ===
No.	Date	Tournament	Winning score	To par	Margin of victory	Runner-up
1	26 Nov 2017	Andrés Romero Invitational	71-67-66=204	−12	1 stroke	(Argentina) Rafael Echenique
2	5 Sep 2021	Abierto del Norte	70-67-63-63=263	−21	2 strokes	(Argentina) César Costilla
3	6 Sep 2025	Abierto del Norte (2)	67-67-69-62=265	−19	2 strokes	(Argentina) Franco Romero
4	8 Dec 2025	Abierto del Oeste	61-66-70-77=274	−14	1 stroke	(Argentina) Joaquín Ludueña
5	14 Jun 2026	Abierto del Norte (3)	68-67-66-71=272	−12	Playoff	(Argentina) Segundo Oliva Pinto (a)

=== Colombian Tour wins (3) ===
No.	Date	Tournament	Winning score	To par	Margin of victory	Runner(s)-up
1	28 Jul 2019	Abierto Club El Rodeo	72-66-71-66=275	−9	1 stroke	(Colombia) Diego Vanegas
2	3 Aug 2019	Cartagena-Karibana Colombian Open	68-64-72-62=266	−22	3 strokes	(Argentina) Alejandro Tosti
3	26 Nov 2023	Abierto de Golf de La Sabana Club Campestre	64-66-70=200	−13	2 strokes	(Colombia) Ricardo Celia, (Colombia) Santiago Chamorro

=== Ángel Cabrera Tour wins (3) ===
- 2015 Fecha 4
- 2016 Fecha 1, Fecha 4

== Team appearances ==
- Aruba Cup (representing PGA Tour Latinoamérica): 2016 (winners)

== See also ==
- 2022 Korn Ferry Tour Finals graduates
