= Golf at the 2022 South American Games =

Golf competitions at the 2022 South American Games

- Venue: Asunción Golf Club
- Dates: 5−8 October
- Nations: 11

Golf competitions at the 2022 South American Games in Asunción, Paraguay were held 5–8 October 2022 at the Asunción Golf Club

== Schedule ==
The competition schedule is as follows:

R	Preliminary Round	FR	Final round

Date Event	Wed 5	Thu 6	Fri 7	Sat 8
Men	R1	R2	R3	FR
Women	R1	R2	R3	FR
Team	R1	R2	R3	FR

== Medal summary ==
=== Medal table ===
* Host nation (Paraguay)

Rank	Nation	Gold	Silver	Bronze	Total
1	Argentina (ARG)	2	0	0	2
2	Colombia (COL)	1	0	2	3
3	Paraguay (PAR)*	0	3	0	3
4	Chile (CHI)	0	0	1	1
Totals (4 entries)		3	3	3	9

=== Medalists ===
Event	Gold	Silver	Bronze
Men's individual	Jorge Fernández-Valdés; Argentina	Fabrizio Zanotti; Paraguay	Cristóbal del Solar; Chile
Women's individual	María José Marín; Colombia	Maria Fernanda Escauriza; Paraguay	Paula Hurtado; Colombia
Mixed team	Jorge Fernández-Valdés; Magdalena Simmermacher; Tommy Cocha; Valentina Rossi; Argentina	Anahi Servin; Fabrizio Zanotti; Carlos Franco; Maria Fernanda Escauriza; Paraguay	Iván Ramírez; Juan Luna; María José Marín; Paula Hurtado; Colombia

== Participation ==
Eleven nations participated in golf events of the 2022 South American Games.

- Argentina
- Bolivia
- Brazil
- Chile
- Colombia
- Ecuador
- Panama
- Paraguay
- Peru
- Uruguay
- Venezuela

== Results ==
=== Men ===
Rank	Name	Nation	Round 1	Round 2	Round 3	Round 4	Total
1st place, gold medalist(s)	Jorge Fernández-Valdes	Argentina	72	68	70	70	280 (−4)
2nd place, silver medalist(s)	Arnaldo Zanotti	Paraguay	71	67	70	74	282 (−2)
3rd place, bronze medalist(s)	Cristóbal del Solar	Chile	72	72	73	73	290 (+6)
4	Juan Alberto Álvarez	Uruguay	74	71	73	72	290 (+6)
5	Tomás Cocha	Argentina	76	73	67	75	291 (+7)
6	Diego Pérez	Uruguay	74	74	74	71	293 (+9)
7	José Andrés Gómez	Ecuador	75	74	71	74	294 (+10)
8	Carlos Franco	Paraguay	78	72	74	72	296 (+12)
9	Matías Calderón	Chile	79	74	70	74	297 (+13)
10	Flavio Sameja	Bolivia	74	71	76	77	298 (+14)
11=	Erik Plenge	Peru	75	77	72	75	299 (+15)
11=	Iván Ramírez	Colombia	72	76	70	81	299 (+15)
13	Juan Pablo Luna	Colombia	79	77	72	75	303 (+19)
14=	Richard Rojas	Venezuela	73	74	76	84	307 (+23)
14=	Denis Meneghini	Venezuela	79	76	77	75	307 (+23)
16	Andrey Borges	Brazil	78	74	77	79	308 (+24)
17	José Luis Muñoz	Peru	73	77	80	79	309 (+25)
18	Juan Alberto Moncayo	Ecuador	79	73	76	83	311 (+27)
19	Camilo Ávila	Bolivia	79	83	76	75	313 (+29)
20	Samuel Durán	Panama	80	73	77	84	314 (+30)
21	Jean Paul Ducruet	Panama	86	80	75	82	323 (+39)

=== Women ===
Rank	Name	Nation	Round 1	Round 2	Round 3	Round 4	Total
1st place, gold medalist(s)	María José Marín	Colombia	76	72	68	73	289 (+1)
2nd place, silver medalist(s)	María Fernanda Escauriza	Paraguay	79	75	74	70	298 (+10)
3rd place, bronze medalist(s)	Paula Hurtado	Colombia	77	74	72	76	299 (+11)
4	Magdalena Simmermacher	Argentina	77	77	75	75	304 (+16)
5	Kitty Hwang	Ecuador	79	77	75	77	308 (+20)
6	Valentina Rossi	Argentina	73	76	76	84	309 (+21)
7	Natalia Villavicencio	Chile	73	81	74	83	311 (+23)
8	Anika Veintemilla	Ecuador	84	76	74	79	313 (+25)
9	Stephanie Gelleni	Venezuela	80	82	76	79	317 (+29)
10	Aitana Tuesta	Peru	81	85	81	79	326 (+38)
11	Claudia Perazzo	Venezuela	85	81	79	83	328 (+40)
12	María García Austt	Uruguay	85	79	80	86	330 (+42)
13	Clara Laffitte	Uruguay	95	80	79	86	340 (+52)
14	Tais Moreno	Bolivia	93	87	83	80	343 (+55)
15	Mayerly Peña	Bolivia	84	85	96	81	346 (+58)
	Zoe Pinillos	Peru	81				81
	Anahi Servin	Paraguay	DQF				
	Valentina Haupt	Chile	DNF				

=== Team ===
Rank	Name	Nation	Round 1	Round 2	Round 3	Round 4	Total
1st place, gold medalist(s)	Jorge Fernández-Valdes / Magdalena Simmermacher / Tomás Cocha / Valentina Rossi	Argentina	145	144	142	145	576
2nd place, silver medalist(s)	Arnaldo Zanotti / Anahí Servin / Carlos Franco / María Fernanda Escauriza	Paraguay	150	142	144	142	578
3rd place, bronze medalist(s)	Iván Ramírez / María José Marín / Juan Pablo Luna / Paula Hurtado	Colombia	148	138	148	148	582
4	Cristóbal del Solar / Natalia Villavicencio / Matías Calderón / Valentina Haupt	Chile	145	146	144	152	587
5	José Andrés Gómez / Anika Veintemilla / Juan Alberto Moncayo / Kitty Hwang	Ecuador	154	149	145	151	599
6	Denis Meneghini / Claudia Perazzo / Richard Rojas / Stephanie Gelleni	Venezuela	153	155	152	153	613
7	Diego Pérez / Clara Laffitte / Juan Alberto Álvarez / María García Austt	Uruguay	159	150	152	157	618
8	Erik Plenge / Aitana Tuesta / José Luis Muñoz / Zoe Pinillos	Peru	154	162	153	154	623
9	Camilo Ávila / Mayerly Peña / Flavio Sameja / Tais Moreno	Bolivia	158	156	159	157	630
