= Sam Stevens (golfer) =

American professional golfer (born 1996)

Personal information
- Nationality: United States
- Born: July 4, 1996 (age 30) Fort Worth, Texas, U.S.
- Height: 6 ft 1 in (1.85 m)
- Weight: 190 lb (86 kg; 14 st)
- Spouse: Kelsey
- Children: 4

Career
- Sport: Golf
- College: Oklahoma State University
- Turned professional: 2018
- Current tour: PGA Tour
- Former tours: Korn Ferry Tour; PGA Tour Latinoamérica
- Professional wins: 1
- Highest ranking: 39 (February 8, 2026) (as of October 25, 2026)

Best results in major championships
- Masters Tournament: T24: 2026
- PGA Championship: T60: 2025
- U.S. Open: T7: 2026
- The Open Championship: CUT: 2026

Sam Stevens (born July 4, 1996) is an American professional golfer who currently plays on the PGA Tour.

== Collegiate career ==
Stevens attended Oklahoma State University from 2014 to 2018, and played with the Oklahoma State Cowboys golf team.

He was a member of the 2018 NCAA title winning team alongside Viktor Hovland and Matthew Wolff.

== Professional career ==
Stevens turned professional in 2018 and joined the 2019 PGA Tour Latinoamérica. In 2021, he won the Holcim Colombia Classic and graduated to the 2022 Korn Ferry Tour, where he right away graduated to the 2022–23 PGA Tour.

In his rookie PGA Tour season, he was runner-up at the 2023 Valero Texas Open, and in 2024 he tied for second at the Wichita Open. After he was runner-up at the 2025 Farmers Insurance Open, he rose into the top-75 on the Official World Golf Ranking for the first time.

== Personal life ==
Stevens is a third-generation professional golfer. His grandfather, Johnny, made 30 PGA Tour starts in the 1960s, and his father, Charlie, made two starts on the 1992 Korn Ferry Tour.

== Amateur wins ==
- 2013 Mirimichi PGA Junior Series, Trusted Choice Big I National Championship
- 2014 Kansas Junior Amateur
- 2015 Kansas Amateur

== Professional wins (1) ==
=== PGA Tour Latinoamérica wins (1) ===
No.	Date	Tournament	Winning score	Margin of victory	Runner-up
1	Jun 20, 2021	Holcim Colombia Classic	−11 (66-69-69-69=273)	1 stroke	(United States) Paul Imondi

== Results in major championships ==
Tournament	2022	2023	2024	2025	2026
Masters Tournament					T24
PGA Championship		T72		T60	T65
U.S. Open	T49	T43		T23	T7
The Open Championship					CUT

Top 10
Did not play

"T" indicates a tie for a place

=== Summary ===
Tournament	Wins	2nd	3rd	Top-5	Top-10	Top-25	Events	Cuts made
Masters Tournament	0	0	0	0	0	1	1	1
PGA Championship	0	0	0	0	0	0	3	3
U.S. Open	0	0	0	0	1	2	4	4
The Open Championship	0	0	0	0	0	0	1	0
Totals	0	0	0	0	1	3	9	8

- Most consecutive cuts made – 8 (2022 U.S. Open – 2026 U.S. Open)
- Longest streak of top-10s – 1 (once)

== Results in The Players Championship ==
Tournament	2024	2025	2026
The Players Championship	CUT	CUT	58

CUT = missed the half-way cut

== See also ==
- 2022 Korn Ferry Tour Finals graduates
