= M. J. Maguire =

American professional golfer (born 1992)

Personal information
- Full name: Michael J. Maguire
- Nationality: United States
- Born: October 19, 1992 (age 34) St. Petersburg, Florida, U.S.
- Height: 6 ft 1 in (1.85 m)
- Weight: 205 lb (93 kg; 14.6 st)

Career
- Sport: Golf
- College: University of North Florida
- Turned professional: 2015
- Current tours: Asian Tour; PGA Tour of Australasia
- Former tours: Korn Ferry Tour; PGA Tour Latinoamérica
- Professional wins: 4

Number of wins by tour
- Asian Tour: 1
- Other: 3

Michael J. Maguire (born October 19, 1992) is an American professional golfer who plays on the Asian Tour.

== Amateur career ==
Maguire had success at AJGA events in 2009, finishing runner-up at Golf Pride and Cliffs at Walnut Cover, and winning the Bobby Chapman Junior Invitational in a playoff. In 2014 he won the Southern Amateur, earning an invitation to the PGA Tour's Bay Hill Invitational.

Maguire attended University of North Florida between 2011 and 2015, where he was a multi-time All-American and led all players in medal play with three eagles at the 2012 NCAA Championship at Riviera Country Club.

== Professional career ==
Maguire turned professional in 2015. He joined the PGA Tour Latinoamérica, and in 2018 he was runner-up at the Dominican Republic Open and Center Open in Argentina, before winning the Shell Open at Trump National Doral Miami in 2020.

Maguire finished 5th in the Order of Merit to graduate to the Korn Ferry Tour for 2022, where he recorded two top-10 finishes.

In 2023, he joined the Asian Tour, where he won the 2024 Black Mountain Championship in Thailand, an International Series event, and finished 6th in the season rankings.

In 2025, he tied for 3rd at the Hong Kong Open, behind Tom McKibbin and Peter Uihlein, after carding a 61. In 2026, he tied for 3rd at the New Zealand PGA Championship.

== Amateur wins ==
- 2009 Bobby Chapman Junior Invitational
- 2013 Atlantic Sun Championship
- 2014 Irish Creek Collegiate, Southern Amateur

== Professional wins (4) ==
=== Asian Tour wins (1) ===
Legend
International Series (1)
Other Asian Tour (0)

No.	Date	Tournament	Winning score	To par	Margin of victory	Runner-up
1	Oct 20, 2024	Black Mountain Championship	68-64-68-65=265	−23	Playoff	(United States) John Catlin

Asian Tour playoff record (1–0)

No.	Year	Tournament	Opponent	Result
1	2024	Black Mountain Championship	(United States) John Catlin	Won with birdie on second extra hole

=== PGA Tour Latinoamérica wins (1) ===
No.	Date	Tournament	Winning score	To par	Margin of victory	Runner-up
1	Dec 13, 2020	Shell Open	69-66-66-67=268	−16	2 strokes	(Argentina) Andrés Gallegos

=== Other wins (2) ===
No.	Date	Tournament	Winning score	To par	Margin of victory	Runner-up
1	Nov 17, 2021	Jamaica Open	66-73-69=208	−8	Playoff	(United States) Ryan Sullivan
2	Mar 6, 2022	Yuengling Open	61-69=130	−10	2 strokes	(Scotland) Sean Jacklin
