= Timothy O'Neal (golfer) =

American golfer

Personal information
- Full name: Timothy Andrea O'Neal
- Nationality: United States
- Born: August 3, 1972 (age 54) Savannah, Georgia, U.S.
- Height: 6 ft 0 in (1.83 m)
- Weight: 172 lb (78 kg; 12.3 st)
- Children: 2

Career
- Sport: Golf
- College: Jackson State University
- Turned professional: 1997
- Current tour: PGA Tour Champions
- Former tours: Asian Tour; Web.com Tour; PGA Tour Latinoamérica; Alps Tour; EPD Tour; Golden Bear Tour
- Professional wins: 9

Number of wins by tour
- PGA Tour Champions: 1
- Other: 8

Best results in major championships
- Masters Tournament: DNP
- PGA Championship: DNP
- U.S. Open: CUT: 2015
- The Open Championship: DNP

Timothy Andrea O'Neal (born August 3, 1972) is an American professional golfer who currently plays on PGA Tour Champions. His career also includes stops on PGA Tour Latinoamérica and Web.com Tour. He has won seven professional events on four continents: North America, Europe, Africa and South America. He is also known for his close finishes at PGA Tour Q School, where he missed earning a PGA Tour card by a single stroke on two occasions.

== Amateur career ==
Prior to turning professional, O'Neal had a distinguished amateur career winning 16 college tournaments during his time at Jackson State University. He also won the Georgia Amateur Championship in 1997.

== Professional career ==
For a very brief period early in his professional career, Will Smith sponsored O'Neal. O'Neal mainly played on U.S. mini-tours until receiving his Buy.com Tour card for the 2001 season (now named the Korn Ferry Tour), having missed out on a PGA Tour card at qualifying school by a single stroke following a double bogey on the final hole. O'Neal had a tough first season on the tour recording only two top-10 finishes ending 59th on the money list. In the following season, O'Neal only played three events on the Buy.com Tour and lost his tour card for the 2003 season.

In 2004, O'Neal once again missed out on a PGA Tour card at qualifying school by a single stroke but in doing so regained his playing rights for the Nationwide Tour for the 2005 season.

The return to the Nationwide Tour proved more successful and during the 2005 season O'Neal recorded his best finish to date, a second place at the 2005 Northeast Pennsylvania Classic. O'Neal maintained his good form throughout 2005 and 2006 finishing 44th and 36th on the tour money lists respectively. However his form dropped in 2007 and 2008 and he was unable to retain his card following the 2008 season.

O'Neal's career started to falter after losing his Nationwide Tour privileges. He also played on the Asian Tour, eGolf Professional Tour, the EPD Tour, and the Morocco-based Atlas Pro Tour. In 2011, O'Neal was asked to take over the Jackson State golf program, but he declined. He has yet to become a swing instructor.

In 2013, O'Neal took up playing rights on PGA Tour Latinoamérica and had instant success winning the Arturo Calle Colombian Open and the Abierto de Chile in his first season on the tour. These wins together assisted O'Neal to a third-place finish on the PGA Tour Latinoamérica Order of Merit which was sufficient for him to regain his tour card for the 2014 Web.com Tour.

At age 42, O'Neal finally played his first PGA Tour event after qualifying for the 2015 U.S. Open, where he missed the cut. O'Neal also played on the Advocates Pro Golf Tour, a professional golf tour that aims to open more playing opportunities for minorities. In 2022, O'Neal was one of five golfers to earn a PGA Tour Champions card through Q School.

O'Neal won the Dominion Energy Charity Classic in October 2024, his first PGA Tour Champions victory. His victory earned him $350,000 and secured his card for the 2025 PGA Tour Champions season.

== Amateur wins ==
- 1997 Georgia Amateur Championship

== Professional wins (9) ==
=== PGA Tour Latinoamérica wins (3) ===
No.	Date	Tournament	Winning score	Margin of victory	Runner(s)-up
1	May 5, 2013	Arturo Calle Colombian Open	−16 (68-66-68-66=268)	2 strokes	(Mexico) Óscar Serna
2	Nov 24, 2013	Chile Open	−13 (66-72-70-67=275)	Playoff	(United States) Ryan Blaum, (Argentina) Sebastián Saavedra
3	May 14, 2016	Casa de Campo Dominican Republic Open	−10 (72-67-68-71=278)	4 strokes	(United States) Paul Apyan, (Argentina) Rafael Echenique, (Bolivia) Sebastian MacLean

=== Alps Tour wins (1) ===
No.	Date	Tournament	Winning score	Margin of victory	Runner-up
1	Feb 10, 2012	Open Palmeraie PGP	−16 (66-67-67=200)	3 strokes	(Italy) Matteo Delpodio

=== EPD Tour wins (2) ===
No.	Date	Tournament	Winning score	Margin of victory	Runner-up
1	Feb 22, 2012	Open Mogador	+3 (70-76-73=219)	2 strokes	(France) Jérôme Lando-Casanova
2	Apr 11, 2012	Open Madaef	−4 (71-72-69=212)	1 stroke	(Finland) Janne Martikainen

=== Golden Bear Tour wins (1) ===
No.	Date	Tournament	Winning score	Margin of victory	Runner-up
1	Sep 25, 2003	John O' Challenge	−12 (64-68=132) (Note: Shortened to 36 holes due to weather.)	Shared title with (United States) Ryan LaVoie	

=== Other wins (1) ===
- 2018 Georgia Open

=== PGA Tour Champions wins (1) ===
Legend
Charles Schwab Cup playoff events (1)
Other PGA Tour Champions (0)

No.	Date	Tournament	Winning score	Margin of victory	Runner-up
1	Oct 20, 2024	Dominion Energy Charity Classic	−13 (71-67-65=203)	2 strokes	(Argentina) Ricardo González
