= 2020 PGA Tour Canada =

Golf tour season

2020 PGA Tour Canada season

The 2020 PGA Tour Canada, titled as the 2020 Mackenzie Tour-PGA Tour Canada for sponsorship reasons, was intended to be the 35th season of the Canadian Tour, and the eighth under the operation and running of the PGA Tour.

== In-season changes ==
In early March, the tour's four remaining qualifying tournaments were postponed due to the COVID-19 pandemic. On April 16, it was announced that the first six tournaments would also be postponed. On May 29, the tour announced the cancellation of the entire season.

With the cancellation of the season, the PGA Tour created an eight tournament LocaliQ Series based in the United States in which tour members, along with members of those of the suspended 2020 PGA Tour Latinoamérica and the canceled 2020 PGA Tour China seasons, would be eligible to compete. In addition, four tournaments, the Canada Life Series, were played in Canada in August and September to provide Canadian-based players some playing opportunities.

== Schedule ==
The following table lists intended official events during the 2020 season.

Date	Tournament	Location
May 31	Canada Life Open	British Columbia
Jun 7	DCBank Open	British Columbia
Jun 14	GolfBC Championship	British Columbia
Jun 28	Lethbridge Paradise Canyon Open	Alberta
Jul 5	Prince Edward Island Pro-Am	Prince Edward Island
Jul 12	Osprey Valley Open	Ontario
Jul 19	Windsor Championship	Ontario
Aug 9	ATB Financial Classic	Alberta
Aug 16	Manitoba Open	Manitoba
Aug 23	CRMC Championship	Minnesota
Aug 30	Ontario Open	Ontario
Sep 13	Mackenzie Investments Open	Quebec
Sep 20	Canada Life Championship	Ontario

== Canada Life Series ==
A series of four 54-hole tournaments was organised in August and September.

Date	Tournament	Location	Purse (C$)	Winner
Aug 12	Canada Life Series at Bear Mountain	British Columbia	50,000	(Canada) Evan Holmes
Aug 19	Canada Life Series at Bear Mountain	British Columbia	50,000	(China) Cao Yi
Sep 4	Canada Life Series at TPC Toronto	Ontario	50,000	(South Africa) Albert Pistorius
Sep 11	Canada Life Series Championship at TPC Toronto	Ontario	50,000	(Canada) Laurent Desmarchais (a)

== See also ==
- 2020 PGA Tour China
- 2020–21 PGA Tour Latinoamérica
