= 2023 PGA Tour Latinoamérica =

Golf tour season

2023 PGA Tour Latinoamérica season
- Duration: December 1, 2022 – July 2, 2023
- Number of official events: 12
- Most wins: (United States) Chandler Blanchet (2)
- Order of Merit: (United States) Chandler Blanchet

The 2023 PGA Tour Latinoamérica was the 11th and final season of PGA Tour Latinoamérica, the main professional golf tour in Latin America, operated and run by the PGA Tour.

In April, the PGA Tour announced that the 2023 season would be the last, as from 2024 the tour would merge with PGA Tour Canada, creating PGA Tour Americas.

== Schedule ==
The following table lists official events during the 2023 season.

Date	Tournament	Host country	Purse (US$)	Winner (Note: The number in parentheses after each winner's name is the number of PGA Tour Latinoamérica events they had won up to and including that tournament. It is rare for someone to accumulate many wins on PGA Tour Latinoamérica as success at this level usually leads to promotion to the Korn Ferry Tour.)	OWGR points
Dec 4	Visa Open de Argentina	Argentina	175,000	(United States) Zack Fischer (1)	3.99
Dec 11	Neuquen Argentina Classic	Argentina	175,000	(Chile) Cristóbal del Solar (4)	3.13
Dec 18	Scotia Wealth Management Chile Open	Chile	175,000	(United States) Matt Ryan (2)	2.91
Mar 19	Termas de Río Hondo Invitational	Argentina	175,000	(United States) Jake McCrory (1)	2.36
Mar 26	Roberto De Vicenzo Memorial	Argentina	175,000	(United States) Chandler Blanchet (2)	2.73
Apr 2	JHSF Aberto do Brasil	Brazil	175,000	(New Zealand) Charlie Hillier (1)	2.74
Apr 30	Diners Club Peru Open	Peru	175,000	(Argentina) Marcos Montenegro (1)	3.05
May 7	Kia Open	Ecuador	175,000	(Finland) Toni Hakula (2)	3.34
May 28	Colombia Classic	Colombia	175,000	(United States) Walker Lee (1)	3.06
Jun 4	Inter Rapidisimo Golf Championship	Colombia	175,000	(Canada) Myles Creighton (1)	3.01
Jun 25	Jalisco Open GDL	Mexico	175,000	(Mexico) José de Jesús Rodríguez (6)	3.24
Jul 2	Bupa Tour Championship	Mexico	200,000	(United States) Chandler Blanchet (3)	2.18

== Order of Merit ==
The Order of Merit was titled as the Totalplay Cup and was based on tournament results during the season, calculated using a points-based system. The top five players on the Order of Merit earned status to play on the 2024 Korn Ferry Tour.

Position	Player	Points
1	(United States) Chandler Blanchet	1,539
2	(Canada) Myles Creighton	1,146
3	(United States) Walker Lee	1,014
4	(United States) Austin Hitt	897
5	(New Zealand) Charlie Hillier	889

== Developmental Series ==
2022–23 PGA Tour Latinoamérica Developmental Series season
- Duration: July 28, 2022 – November 4, 2023
- Number of official events: 17
- Dev Series Final: (United States) Joel Thelen

The 2022–23 PGA Tour Latinoamérica Developmental Series was the 10th and final season of the PGA Tour Latinoamérica Developmental Series, the official development tour to PGA Tour Latinoamérica between 2013 and 2023.

=== Schedule ===
The following table lists official events during the 2022–23 season.

Date	Tournament	Host country	Purse	Winner (Note: The number in parentheses after each winner's name is the number of PGA Tour Latinoamérica Developmental Series events they had won up to and including that tournament. As most Developmental Series events are incorporated from regional tour schedules, details of these wins are displayed there instead.)	Main tour (Note: CHL − Chilean Tour; COL − Colombian Tour; GGPM − Gira de Golf Profesional Mexicana; TPG − TPG Tour.)
Jul 31	Abierto de Colombia	Colombia	Col$200,000,000	(Colombia) Camilo Aguado	COL
Aug 20	Amanali Classic	Mexico	Mex$1,600,000	(United States) Joel Thelen	GGPM
Sep 3	Andrés Romero Invitational	Argentina	Arg$4,000,000	(Argentina) Leandro Marelli	TPG
Sep 11	Abierto de Ecuador	Ecuador	US$20,000	(Ecuador) Juan Moncayo (2)	
Oct 8	Abierto del Bajío	Mexico	Mex$1,600,000	(Mexico) Isidro Benítez	GGPM
Nov 12	Copa Multimedios	Mexico	Mex$1,600,000	(Mexico) Raúl Pereda	GGPM
Jan 22	Abierto Rocas de Santo Domingo	Chile	CLP$18,000,000	(Chile) Felipe Aguilar	CHL
Jan 29	El Campanario Classic	Mexico	Mex$1,600,000	(Mexico) José Cristóbal Islas (a)	GGPM
Feb 11	Tabachines Classic	Mexico	Mex$1,600,000	(Guatemala) José Toledo	GGPM
Mar 5	Abierto de San Luis	Argentina	Arg$8,000,000	(Argentina) Emilio Domínguez	TPG
Mar 18	Abierto de Venezuela	Venezuela	US$50,000	(Argentina) Julián Etulain (1)	
Apr 8	Abierto del Centro	Argentina	Arg$8,000,000	(Argentina) Nelson Ledesma	TPG
Apr 15	Abierto de Aguascalientes	Mexico	Mex$1,600,000	(Mexico) Luis Garza	GGPM
May 20	Altozano Open	Mexico	Mex$1,600,000	(Mexico) José de Jesús Rodríguez	GGPM
Jun 17	Abierto Termas de Río Hondo	Argentina	Arg$9,200,000	(Argentina) Andrés Romero	TPG
Jul 16	Gran Final Tres Vidas Acapulco	Mexico	Mex$3,000,000	(Guatemala) José Toledo	GGPM
Nov 4	Dev Series Final	Mexico	US$40,000	(United States) Joel Thelen (1)	

=== Dev Series Final ===
The Dev Series Final was made up of the top-five finishers of each tournament during the season. The top three finishers in the Dev Series Final earned status to play on the 2024 PGA Tour Americas.

Place	Player	Score	To par
1	(United States) Joel Thelen	65-62-67-69=263	−21
T2	(United States) Samuel Anderson	66-67-67-64=264	−20
T2	(Costa Rica) Paul Chaplet	67-69-64-64=264	−20

== See also ==
- 2023 PGA Tour Canada
