= Ryan Blaum =

American professional golfer (born 1983)

Personal information
- Full name: Ryan Stephen Blaum
- Nationality: United States
- Born: October 16, 1983 (age 43) Miami, Florida, U.S.
- Height: 5 ft 9 in (1.75 m)
- Weight: 165 lb (75 kg; 11.8 st)
- Spouse: Ashley (m. 2010)

Career
- Sport: Golf
- College: Duke University
- Turned professional: 2007
- Current tour: PGA Tour
- Former tours: Web.com Tour; Challenge Tour; PGA Tour Latinoamérica; Tarheel Tour
- Professional wins: 11

Best results in major championships
- Masters Tournament: DNP
- PGA Championship: DNP
- U.S. Open: CUT: 2009, 2014
- The Open Championship: DNP

Achievements and awards
- PGA Tour Latinoamérica Order of Merit winner: 2013

Ryan Stephen Blaum (born October 16, 1983) is an American professional golfer who currently plays on the PGA Tour, having previously played on Korn Ferry Tour, PGA Tour Latinoamérica and the NGA Pro Golf Tour.

== Amateur career ==
Blaum played college golf at Duke University and was named as Duke University's Most Valuable Player and the Atlantic Coast Conference Rookie of the Year during the 2002-03 season. He followed this by being named the Atlantic Coast Conference Player of the Year in the 2004–05 season.

Blaum has also participated four times in the U.S. Amateur reaching the second round in 2001 and 2005.

== Professional career ==
In 2009, Blaum qualified for the U.S. Open and missed the cut by a single stroke, this was his only appearance in a major championship until 2014 when he again played in the U.S. Open and failed to make the cut.

In his early professional career, Blaum mainly played on U.S. mini-tours although he did make occasional appearances on the PGA Tour and Nationwide Tour with a best finish of tied for 15th at the Puerto Rico Open on the PGA Tour in 2008. He also played sparingly on the Challenge Tour in Europe in 2010 and 2011. His best finish was tied for second at the 2010 Allianz EurOpen Strasbourg.

In 2012, Blaum took up membership on the inaugural season of PGA Tour Latinoamérica, however his first season on the tour was winless. In 2012, Blaum also won the 79th Waterloo Open Golf Classic in Iowa.

Blaum's breakthrough on PGA Tour Latinoamérica came during the 2013 season which featured two victories at the Dominican Republic Open and the Aberto do Brasil. These two victories combined with a further five top-10 finishes helped Blaum to finish in first place on the PGA Tour Latinoamérica Order of Merit for 2013, a ranking which earned him an automatic place on the 2014 Web.com Tour. In his first three seasons on the Web.com Tour, Blaum earned enough to qualify for the Web.com Tour Finals, but did not earn a PGA Tour card.

== Amateur wins ==
- 2004 Eastern Amateur

== Professional wins (11) ==
=== PGA Tour Latinoamérica wins (2) ===
No.	Date	Tournament	Winning score	Margin of victory	Runner-up
1	Jun 1, 2013	Dominican Republic Open	−9 (74-69-68-68=279)	2 strokes	(Argentina) Maximiliano Godoy
2	Oct 20, 2013	Aberto do Brasil	−11 (69-63-67-66=265)	Playoff	(Argentina) Alan Wagner

=== NGA Pro Golf Tour wins (6) ===
- 2007 Charleston Miracle League Open
- 2008 Michelob Ultra Classic
- 2011 Kandy Waters Memorial Classic
- 2013 Magnolia Bluffs Casino Classic
- Two other wins on the NGA Pro Golf Tour

=== Tarheel Tour wins (2) ===
No.	Date	Tournament	Winning score	Margin of victory	Runner(s)-up
1	Oct 12, 2007	Salisbury Classic	−12 (69-66-66=201)	4 strokes	(United States) Bo Abney, (United States) Jeff Curl, (United States) Ryan Hybl, (United States) Rob Johnson
2	Jun 26, 2008	Pete Dye Classic	−8 (68-70-70=208)	1 stroke	(United States) Joel Hendry

=== Other wins (1) ===
- 2012 Waterloo Open Golf Classic

== Results in major championships ==
Tournament	2009	2010	2011	2012	2013	2014
Masters Tournament						
U.S. Open	CUT					CUT
The Open Championship						
PGA Championship						

Did not play

CUT = missed the half-way cut

=== Summary ===
Tournament	Wins	2nd	3rd	Top-5	Top-10	Top-25	Events	Cuts made
Masters Tournament	0	0	0	0	0	0	0	0
U.S. Open	0	0	0	0	0	0	2	0
The Open Championship	0	0	0	0	0	0	0	0
PGA Championship	0	0	0	0	0	0	0	0
Totals	0	0	0	0	0	0	2	0

- Most consecutive cuts made – 0
- Longest streak of top-10s – 0

== U.S. national team appearances ==
Amateur

- Palmer Cup: 2005 (winners), 2006

== See also ==
- 2016 Web.com Tour Finals graduates
