= Óscar Fraustro =

Mexican professional golfer (born 1982)

Personal information
- Nationality: Mexico
- Born: 14 June 1982 (age 44) Mexico City, Mexico
- Height: 6 ft 0 in (1.83 m)
- Weight: 165 lb (75 kg; 11.8 st)
- Children: 2

Career
- Sport: Golf
- Turned professional: 2006
- Current tour: Gira de Golf Profesional Mexicana
- Former tours: PGA Tour Latinoamérica; PGA Tour; Web.com Tour
- Professional wins: 2

Óscar Fraustro (born 14 June 1982) is a Mexican professional golfer.

== Career ==
He turned professional in 2006 and has played on the PGA Tour, Web.com Tour, and PGA Tour Latinoamérica. He finished 43rd in the 2014 Web.com Tour Finals to earn his PGA Tour card for the 2014–15 season.

== Professional wins (2) ==
=== PGA Tour Latinoamérica wins (2) ===
No.	Date	Tournament	Winning score	Margin of victory	Runner(s)-up
1	11 Nov 2012	Dominican Republic Open	−10 (70-70-67-71=278)	4 strokes	(Colombia) Marcelo Rozo
2	10 Sep 2017	San Luis Championship	−9 (67-73-69-70=279)	Playoff	(United States) Brad Hopfinger, (United States) Carlos Sainz Jr.

== Team appearances ==
Amateur

- Eisenhower Trophy (representing Mexico): 2004

Professional

- World Cup (representing Mexico): 2013
- Aruba Cup (representing PGA Tour Latinoamérica): 2017

== See also ==
- 2014 Web.com Tour Finals graduates
