= Jorge Fernández-Valdés =

Argentine professional golfer (born 1992)

Personal information
- Full name: Jorge Diogenes Fernández-Valdés
- Nickname: Jorgito
- Nationality: Argentina
- Born: 6 August 1992 (age 34) Córdoba, Argentina
- Height: 5 ft 11 in (1.80 m)
- Weight: 147 lb (67 kg; 10.5 st)

Career
- Sport: Golf
- Turned professional: 2012
- Current tour: Korn Ferry Tour
- Former tours: PGA Tour Canada; PGA Tour Latinoamérica
- Professional wins: 7

Number of wins by tour
- Korn Ferry Tour: 1
- Other: 6

Best results in major championships
- Masters Tournament: DNP
- PGA Championship: DNP
- U.S. Open: DNP
- The Open Championship: CUT: 2022
Medal record
South American Games
Gold medal – first place	2022 Asunción	Individual
Gold medal – first place	2022 Asunción	Mixed team

Jorge Diogenes Fernández-Valdés (born 6 August 1992) is an Argentine professional golfer who currently plays on the Korn Ferry Tour.

== Amateur career ==
Fernández-Valdés had a successful junior career representing Argentina at the 2009 Toyota Junior Golf World Cup in Japan and finishing runner up in the 2010 Callaway Junior World Golf Championships in the 15-17 age category at Torrey Pines Golf Course.

During his amateur career Fernández-Valdés also competed in the 2008 U.S. Junior Amateur and was a two-time winner of the Pereyra Iraola Cup in 2008 and 2011 as the low amateur in the Argentine Open.

== Professional career ==
Fernández-Valdés turned professional in 2012 and immediately joined PGA Tour Latinoamérica, making his inaugural start on the tour at the 2012 Roberto De Vicenzo Invitational Copa NEC. During the 2012 season he earned his full playing rights for PGA Tour Latinoamérica at qualifying in Buenos Aires and finished 27th on the Order of Merit.

In 2013, Fernández-Valdés achieved his first career win as a professional at the Mundo Maya Open becoming the youngest ever PGA Tour Latinoamérica champion at 20 years and 9 months old. During 2013 Fernández-Valdés posted a further six top ten finishes on PGA Tour Latinoamérica and finished fourth on the Order of Merit earning him Web.com Tour status for the 2014 season.

During 2013 Fernández-Valdés also made eight appearances on PGA Tour Canada with one top-10 finish.

In 2014 Fernández-Valdés earned his second win on PGA Tour Latinoamérica at the Abierto de Chile. He also finished second at the Mazatlán Open, fifth at the Aberto do Brasil, sixth at the Ecuador Open and tenth at the Colombian Open, ending fifth at the Order of Merit.

Fernández-Valdés played his way to the Web.com Tour through Q School for 2015. He finished second at the Albertsons Boise Open.

== Amateur wins ==
- 2008 Pereyra Iraola Cup (as low amateur at the Argentine Open)
- 2011 Pereyra Iraola Cup (as low amateur at the Argentine Open)

== Professional wins (7) ==
=== Korn Ferry Tour wins (1) ===
No.	Date	Tournament	Winning score	Margin of victory	Runner-up
1	4 Jun 2023	UNC Health Championship	−13 (66-64-69-68=267)	Playoff	(United States) Trent Phillips

Korn Ferry Tour playoff record (1–0)

No.	Year	Tournament	Opponent	Result
1	2023	UNC Health Championship	(United States) Trent Phillips	Won with birdie on first extra hole

=== PGA Tour Latinoamérica wins (4) ===
No.	Date	Tournament	Winning score	Margin of victory	Runner(s)-up
1	19 May 2013	Mundo Maya Open	−11 (67-69-68-73=277)	1 stroke	(Mexico) Armando Villarreal
2	16 Nov 2014	Hyundai - BBVA Abierto de Chile	−17 (68-62-71-70=271)	2 strokes	(United States) Joel Dahmen, (Mexico) Armando Favela
3	25 Sep 2016	Aberto do Brasil	−4 (69-69-70-72=280)	2 strokes	(Canada) Corey Conners, (United States) Brad Hopfinger, (Chile) Mito Pereira
4	5 Dec 2021 (2022 season)	Visa Open de Argentina	−11 (70-70-67-70=277)	3 strokes	(South Korea) Cho Rak-hyun, (France) Jérémy Gandon

=== TPG Tour wins (1) ===
No.	Date	Tournament	Winning score	Margin of victory	Runners-up
1	26 Jan 2020	Abierto del Sur	−14 (68-67-66-65=266)	2 strokes	(Argentina) Luciano Giometti, (Argentina) Paulo Pinto

=== Other wins (1) ===
No.	Date	Tournament	Winning score	Margin of victory	Runner-up
1	8 Oct 2022	South American Games	−4 (72-68-70-70=280)	2 strokes	(Paraguay) Fabrizio Zanotti

== Results in major championships ==
Tournament	2022
Masters Tournament	
PGA Championship	
U.S. Open	
The Open Championship	CUT

Did not play

CUT = missed the half-way cut

== Team appearances ==
- Eisenhower Trophy (representing Argentina): 2008, 2010
- Toyota Junior Golf World Cup (representing Argentina): 2009 (winners)
