= 2012 PGA Tour Latinoamérica =

Golf tour season

2012 PGA Tour Latinoamérica season
- Duration: September 5, 2012 – December 16, 2012
- Number of official events: 11
- Most wins: (Argentina) Ariel Cañete (2)
- Order of Merit: (Argentina) Ariel Cañete

The 2012 PGA Tour Latinoamérica was the inaugural season of PGA Tour Latinoamérica, the main professional golf tour in Latin America, operated and run by the PGA Tour. The tour was converted from the Tour de las Américas which ceased to operate in 2012.

== Schedule ==
The following table lists official events during the 2012 season.

Date	Tournament	Host country	Purse (US$)	Winner (Note: The number in parentheses after each winner's name is the number of PGA Tour Latinoamérica events they had won up to and including that tournament. It is rare for someone to accumulate many wins on the PGA Tour Latinoamérica as success at this level usually leads to promotion to the Web.com Tour.)	OWGR points
Sep 8	Mundo Maya Open	Mexico	150,000	(Argentina) Tommy Cocha (1)	6
Sep 16	TransAmerican Power Products Open	Mexico	150,000	(Argentina) Ariel Cañete (1)	6
Sep 23	Arturo Calle Colombian Open	Colombia	125,000	(Argentina) Matías O'Curry (1)	6
Oct 6	Aberto do Brasil	Brazil	130,000	(Argentina) Clodomiro Carranza (1)	6
Oct 14	Roberto De Vicenzo Invitational Copa NEC	Argentina	125,000	(Argentina) Alan Wagner (1)	6
Nov 4	Lexus Peru Open	Peru	125,000	(Peru) Sebastián Salem (1)	6
Nov 11	Dominican Republic Open	Dominican Republic	125,000	(Mexico) Óscar Fraustro (1)	6
Nov 18	Puerto Rico Classic	Puerto Rico	125,000	(Mexico) Sebastián Vázquez (1)	6
Dec 2	Arturo Calle Colombian Coffee Classic	Colombia	125,000	(Argentina) Sebastián Fernández (1)	6
Dec 9	Olivos Golf Classic-Copa Personal	Argentina	125,000	(Argentina) Ariel Cañete (2)	6
Dec 16	Visa Open de Argentina	Argentina	125,000	(Argentina) Ángel Cabrera (1)	6

== Order of Merit ==
The Order of Merit was based on prize money won during the season, calculated in U.S. dollars. The top five players on the Order of Merit earned status to play on the 2013 Web.com Tour.

Position	Player	Prize money ($)
1	(Argentina) Ariel Cañete	91,396
2	(Mexico) Óscar Fraustro	70,915
3	(Argentina) Clodomiro Carranza	63,597
4	(Argentina) Matías O'Curry	54,285
5	(Argentina) Tommy Cocha	52,385
