= Clodomiro Carranza =

Argentine golfer

Personal information
- Full name: Clodomiro Carranza Mujica
- Nickname: Miri
- Nationality: Argentina
- Born: 26 April 1982 (age 44) Río Cuarto, Córdoba, Argentina
- Height: 5 ft 10 in (1.78 m)
- Weight: 167 lb (76 kg; 11.9 st)
- Children: 1

Career
- Sport: Golf
- Turned professional: 2002
- Current tour: TPG Tour
- Former tours: European Tour; Web.com Tour; Challenge Tour; PGA Tour Latinoamérica; Tour de las Américas; Gateway Tour
- Professional wins: 15

Achievements and awards
- TPG Tour Order of Merit winner: 2012, 2015

Clodomiro Carranza Mujica (born 26 April 1982) is an Argentinian professional golfer who has played predominantly on the European Tour, Web.com Tour, Tour de las Américas and various other worldwide tours.

== Professional career ==
Carranza turned professional in 2002 and played much of his early career on the Argentine national professional golf tour. His first professional win came at the 2005 Acantilados Grand Prix on the PGA of Argentina Tour.

In 2005 Carranza became a member of the Tour de las Américas and achieved his first win on the tour at the 2008 Carlos Franco Invitational.

From 2005 to 2008 Carranza also played a limited number of events on the Challenge Tour before gaining playing rights for the European Tour for the 2010 and 2011 seasons. However Carranza failed to find success on the European Tour achieving just one top ten finish in 41 career events, eventually losing his tour card following the 2011 season.

In 2012 Carranza joined PGA Tour Latinoamérica and was quickly successful winning the Brazil Open in just his fourth start on the tour. This win coupled with a further four top-10 finishes propelled Carranza to a 3rd-place finish on the PGA Tour Latinoamérica Order of Merit which earned him playing rights on the Web.com Tour for the 2013 season.

2012 was a successful year for Carranza as he also won the Abierto de La Rioja and Abierto Termas de Río Hondo on his native PGA of Argentina Tour.

In 2013 Carranza mainly played on the Web.com Tour but had a disappointing year with just two top-25 finishes in 19 appearances.

== Professional wins (15) ==
=== PGA Tour Latinoamérica wins (2) ===
No.	Date	Tournament	Winning score	Margin of victory	Runner-up
1	6 Oct 2012	Aberto do Brasil	−15 (68-66-70-65=269)	Playoff	(Mexico) José de Jesús Rodríguez
2	11 Nov 2018	Neuquen Argentina Classic	−17 (67-69-66-69=271)	3 strokes	(Argentina) Andrés Gallegos

=== Tour de las Américas wins (1) ===
No.	Date	Tournament	Winning score	Margin of victory	Runner-up
1	26 Oct 2008	Carlos Franco Invitational^{1}	−8 (70-71-71-68=280)	Playoff	(Argentina) César Monasterio

^{1}Co-sanctioned by the TPG Tour

=== TPG Tour wins (8) ===
No.	Date	Tournament	Winning score	Margin of victory	Runner(s)-up
1	26 Oct 2008	Carlos Franco Invitational^{1}	−8 (70-71-71-68=280)	Playoff	(Argentina) César Monasterio
2	29 Apr 2012	Abierto de La Rioja	−13 (66-69-69-71=275)	1 stroke	(Argentina) Julio Zapata
3	29 Jul 2012	Abierto Termas de Río Hondo	−23 (63-65-67-70=265)	1 stroke	(Argentina) Julio Zapata
4	5 Mar 2017	Buenos Aires Classic	−16 (64-64=128)	8 strokes	(Argentina) Daniel Altamirano, (Argentina) Mauricio Molina, (Argentina) Jorge Monroy
5	26 Aug 2017	Abierto Internacional de Golf AguaVista	−1 (74-72-69=215)	3 strokes	(Argentina) César Costilla, (Argentina) Paulo Pinto
6	15 Jun 2019	Abierto de Termas Río Hondo (2)	−24 (62-65-66-71=264)	1 stroke	(Argentina) Ignacio Sosa
7	18 Jun 2022	Abierto de Termas Río Hondo (3)	−8 (70-70-70-74=284)	2 strokes	(Argentina) Oreste Focaccia
8	21 Apr 2024	Abierto de General Pico	−5 (70-67=137) (Note: Shortened to 36 holes due to weather.)	1 stroke	(Argentina) César Costilla, (Argentina) Jorge Monroy, (Argentina) Francisco Roca Bindi

^{1}Co-sanctioned by the Tour de las Américas

=== Chilean Tour wins (2) ===
No.	Date	Tournament	Winning score	Margin of victory	Runner-up
1	2 Feb 2019	Abierto de Granadilla	−17 (67-68-69-67=271)	5 strokes	(Chile) Mito Pereira
2	1 Feb 2020	Abierto de Granadilla (2)	−19 (61-68-70-70=269)	3 strokes	(Chile) Benjamín Alvarado

=== Gateway Tour wins (1) ===
- 2007 Beach Summer 4

=== Ángel Cabrera Tour wins (1) ===
- 2007 Fecha 2

=== Other wins (1) ===
- 2005 Acantilados Grand Prix
