= PGA Tour Latinoamérica =

Professional golf tour

- Formerly: NEC Series-PGA Tour Latinoamérica
- Sport: Golf
- Founded: 2012
- Founder: PGA Tour
- First season: 2012
- Folded: 2023
- Countries: Based in Latin America (Note: Schedules also included events in the United States.)
- Most titles: Tournament wins: (Mexico) José de Jesús Rodríguez (6)
- Related competitions: PGA Tour Canada; PGA Tour China; Tour de las Américas
- Website: https://www.pgatour.com/latinoamerica

PGA Tour Latinoamérica was a third level professional golf tour formed in 2012 and operated by the PGA Tour. It was formed in concert with the now also defunct Tour de las Américas. Executives from the Tour de las Américas became employees of the new tour.

PGA Tour Latinoamérica was one of a number of lower-tier tours that factored into the Official World Golf Ranking, previously awarding a minimum of six points to the winner and points to the top six plus ties. The top five in the tour's Order of Merit earned status to play on the Korn Ferry Tour, with the money leader being fully exempt. The Order of Merit winner also received the Roberto De Vicenzo Award, named after one of the first golf stars to come out of Latin America. Players finishing 6th-50th retained privileges on PGA Tour Latinoamérica, but were also able to advance to the Korn Ferry Tour Qualifying Tournament depending on position. Those 2nd-5th could also improve their status at the Korn Ferry Tour Qualifying Tournament, gaining entry into the final stage.

In April 2023, the PGA Tour announced that the 2023 PGA Tour Latinoamérica season would be the last, as from 2024 the tour would merge with PGA Tour Canada, creating PGA Tour Americas.

== History ==
=== 2012 season ===
The 2012 season was the inaugural season of the tour and ran a series of 11 tournaments from September to December in seven Latin American countries. Colombian Jesús Rivas teed the first shot on the new tour. The Order of Merit winner for the season was Ariel Cañete and the five players to graduate to the Web.com Tour based on their Order of Merit positions were Cañete, Óscar Fraustro, Clodomiro Carranza, Matías O'Curry, and Tommy Cocha.

=== 2013 season ===
The 2013 season was the first full season of play on the tour with an increased schedule of 14 tournaments running in 2 distinct swings with events played from March to May and October to December. Under the new format the number of tournaments was increased. In April 2013, the NEC Corporation became the title sponsor of the tour, being renamed as the NEC Series-PGA Tour Latinoamérica. The Order of Merit winner for the season was Ryan Blaum and the five players to graduate to the Web.com Tour based on their Order of Merit positions were Blaum, José de Jesús Rodríguez, Timothy O'Neal, Jorge Fernández-Valdés, and Manuel Villegas.

=== 2014 season ===
The 2014 season continued to be played in the 2 swing format as in 2013 but was extended to a total of 18 tournaments for the season. A notable addition to the schedule was the Bridgestone America's Golf Cup, a new unofficial money event on the tour; the event has the highest purse of any event on the tour at $600,000. Initially it was confirmed that Tiger Woods and Matt Kuchar would play in the team event; however, following Woods's injuries in 2014, they did not compete. The Order of Merit winner for the season was Julián Etulain and the five players to graduate to the Web.com Tour based on their Order of Merit positions were Etulain, Marcelo Rozo, Tyler McCumber, Brad Hopfinger, and Jorge Fernández-Valdés.

=== 2015 season ===
The 2015 season had one more event than the 2014 season, with one event dropped from the schedule, the TransAmerican Power Products CRV Open, and two added: the Honduras Open and the PGA Tour Latinoamérica Tour Championship. Rodolfo Cazaubón led the Order of Merit to earn a Web.com Tour card. Also exempt are Kent Bulle, Rafael Campos, Alexandre Rocha, and Tommy Cocha.

=== 2016 season ===
The 2016 season had eighteen official events plus The Aruba Cup, an unofficial event where PGA Tour Latinoamérica competed against PGA Tour Canada. The Visa Open de Argentina gave the winner entry into the 2017 Open Championship. The five players that earned Web.com Tour cards were Nate Lashley, Augusto Núñez, Mito Pereira, Emilio Domínguez, and Samuel Del Val.

== Developmental Series ==
In 2013, the tour organized other events from the region into a Developmental Series. The top five finishers from each event qualify for the Dev Series Final, and the top fifteen finishers at the Final earn status on PGA Tour Latinoamérica for the following year. Events on the Dev Series include the Abierto del Sur, Abierto Norpatagónico, Abierto del Litoral, and Abierto de Venezuela.

== Aruba Cup ==
The Aruba Cup was a team tournament first held on December 15–17, 2016 at Tierra del Sol Resort and Country Club. A PGA Tour Latinoamérica team played against a PGA Tour Canada team, with ten players in each team. PGA Tour Latinoamérica won the inaugural event.

== Order of Merit winners ==
Season	Winner	Points
2023	(United States) Chandler Blanchet	1,539
2022	(United States) Mitchell Meissner	1,528
2020–21	(United States) Brandon Matthews	1,191
Season	Winner	Prize money (US$)
2019	(Argentina) Augusto Núñez	148,734
2018	(United States) Harry Higgs	101,336
2017	(Mexico) José de Jesús Rodríguez	119,001
2016	(United States) Nate Lashley	140,897
2015	(Mexico) Rodolfo Cazaubón	129,203
2014	(Argentina) Julián Etulain	92,394
2013	(United States) Ryan Blaum	99,135
2012	(Argentina) Ariel Cañete	91,396
