= 2023 Masters Tournament =

Major golf championship

- Front cover of the 2023 Masters Journal

Tournament information
- Dates: April 6–9, 2023
- Location: Augusta, Georgia, U.S. 33°30′09″N 82°01′12″W
- Course: Augusta National Golf Club
- Tours: PGA Tour; European Tour; Japan Golf Tour

Statistics
- Par: 72
- Length: 7,545 yards (6,899 m)
- Field: 87 players, 54 after cut
- Cut: 147 (+3)
- Prize fund: US$18,000,000
- Winner's share: $3,240,000

Champion
- (Spain) Jon Rahm
- 276 (−12)
- Location in the United States Location in Georgia

The 2023 Masters Tournament was the 87th edition of the Masters Tournament and the first of the men's four major golf championships held in 2023. The tournament was played from April 6–9 at Augusta National Golf Club in Augusta, Georgia, United States.

Jon Rahm became the fourth Spaniard to win the Masters, shooting a three-under-par 69 in the final round for 276 (–12), four strokes ahead of runners-up Brooks Koepka and Phil Mickelson. Seeking his fifth major championship, Koepka led by two shots after the third round, but shot 75 to drop to second. Ten shots back, 52-year-old Mickelson recorded a 65 (−7) to jump into a tie for second, becoming the oldest player in Masters history to finish inside the top five.

== Course ==
The most notable change for 2023 came at the par-5 13th hole, where Augusta National purchased land from the adjacent Augusta Country Club that allowed it to push the tee boxes further back. The dogleg hole's length was extended to 545 yards (498 m), an increase of forty yards (37 m).

Hole	Name	Yards	Par	Hole	Name	Yards	Par
1	Tea Olive	445	4	10	Camellia	495	4
2	Pink Dogwood	575	5	11	White Dogwood	520	4
3	Flowering Peach	350	4	12	Golden Bell	155	3
4	Flowering Crab Apple	240	3	13	Azalea	545	5
5	Magnolia	495	4	14	Chinese Fir	440	4
6	Juniper	180	3	15	Firethorn	550	5
7	Pampas	450	4	16	Redbud	170	3
8	Yellow Jasmine	570	5	17	Nandina	440	4
9	Carolina Cherry	460	4	18	Holly	465	4
Out		3,765	36	In		3,780	36
Source:				Total		7,545	72

== Field ==
Participation in the Masters Tournament is by invitation only, and the tournament has the smallest field of the major championships. There are a number of criteria by which invitations are awarded, including all past winners, recent major champions, leading finishers in the previous year's majors, leading players on the PGA Tour in the previous season, winners of full-point tournaments on the PGA Tour during the previous 12 months, leading players in the Official World Golf Ranking, and some leading amateurs.

=== Criteria ===
Throughout much of 2022, there had been discussion in the media about whether there would be changes to any of the major championship's exemption and qualification criteria following the launch of LIV Golf, and the subsequent response of the PGA Tour to suspend participants in the new series. On December 20, 2022, Augusta National announced that existing criteria for the Masters Tournament would remain unaltered and qualifying LIV players would be invited. This list details the qualification criteria for the 2023 Masters Tournament and the players who have qualified under them; any additional criteria under which players qualified are indicated in parentheses.

1. All past winners of the Masters Tournament

- Fred Couples
- Sergio García
- Dustin Johnson (12,18)
- Zach Johnson
- Bernhard Langer
- Sandy Lyle
- Hideki Matsuyama (13,17,18,19)
- Phil Mickelson (4)
- Larry Mize
- José María Olazábal
- Patrick Reed
- Scottie Scheffler (5,12,13,16,17,18,19)
- Charl Schwartzel (12)
- Adam Scott (17,18,19)
- Vijay Singh
- Jordan Spieth (16,17,18,19)
- Bubba Watson
- Mike Weir
- Tiger Woods
- Danny Willett (12)
- Past winners who did not play: Tommy Aaron, Jack Burke Jr., Ángel Cabrera, Charles Coody, Ben Crenshaw, Nick Faldo, Raymond Floyd, Trevor Immelman, Jack Nicklaus, Mark O'Meara, Gary Player, Craig Stadler, Tom Watson, Ian Woosnam, Fuzzy Zoeller

2. Recent winners of the U.S. Open (2018–2022)

- Bryson DeChambeau
- Matt Fitzpatrick (17,18,19)
- Brooks Koepka (4)
- Jon Rahm (16,17,18,19)
- Gary Woodland

3. Recent winners of The Open Championship (2018–2022)

- Shane Lowry (12,18,19)
- Francesco Molinari
- Collin Morikawa (4,12,17,18,19)
- Cameron Smith (5,12,17,18,19)

4. Recent winners of the PGA Championship (2018–2022)

- Justin Thomas (5,12,17,18,19)

5. Recent winners of The Players Championship (2021–2023)

6. The winner of the gold medal at the Olympic Games (Note: Players qualifying under this category are only eligible for the Masters Tournament following the Olympic Games.)

7. The winner and runner-up in the 2022 U.S. Amateur

- Sam Bennett (a)
- Ben Carr (a)

8. The winner of the 2022 Amateur Championship

- Aldrich Potgieter (a)

9. The winner of the 2022 Asia-Pacific Amateur Championship

- Harrison Crowe (a)

10. The winner of the 2023 Latin America Amateur Championship

- Mateo Fernández de Oliveira (a)

11. The winner of the 2022 U.S. Mid-Amateur Golf Championship

- Matthew McClean (a)

12. The leading 12 players, and those tying for 12th place, from the 2022 Masters Tournament

- Cameron Champ
- Corey Conners (16,17,18,19)
- Im Sung-jae (17,18,19)
- Rory McIlroy (14,16,17,18,19)
- Will Zalatoris (13,15,16,17,18,19) did not play. (Note: Zalatoris withdrew prior to his start time on Thursday due to injury.)

13. The leading four players, and those tying for fourth place, in the 2022 U.S. Open

14. The leading four players, and those tying for fourth place, in the 2022 Open Championship

- Tommy Fleetwood (18,19)
- Viktor Hovland (17,18,19)
- Cameron Young (15,17,18,19)

15. The leading four players, and those tying for fourth place, in the 2022 PGA Championship

- Mito Pereira (18)

16. Winners of tournaments on the PGA Tour between the 2022 Masters Tournament and the 2023 Masters Tournament (Note: Events must carry full-point allocation towards the FedEx Cup.)

- Keegan Bradley (18,19)
- Sam Burns (17,18,19)
- Patrick Cantlay (17,18,19)
- Tony Finau (17,18,19)
- Russell Henley (18,19)
- Max Homa (17,18,19)
- Mackenzie Hughes (18)
- Billy Horschel (17,18,19)
- Kim Si-woo (19)
- Tom Kim (18,19)
- Chris Kirk (19)
- Kurt Kitayama (18,19)
- Lee Kyoung-hoon (17,18,19)
- Taylor Moore (19)
- J. T. Poston (17,19)
- Séamus Power (18,19)
- Justin Rose (19)
- Xander Schauffele (17,18,19)
- Adam Svensson

17. All players who qualified for the 2022 Tour Championship

- Brian Harman (18,19)
- Tom Hoge (18,19)
- Joaquín Niemann (18,19)
- Scott Stallings
- Sepp Straka (18,19)
- Sahith Theegala (18,19)
- Aaron Wise (18,19) did not play.

18. The leading 50 players on the Official World Golf Ranking as of December 31, 2022

- Abraham Ancer (19)
- Ryan Fox (19)
- Talor Gooch
- Tyrrell Hatton (19)
- Kevin Kisner (19)
- Jason Kokrak
- Adrian Meronk
- Kevin Na
- Alex Norén (19)
- Louis Oosthuizen
- Thomas Pieters (19)
- Harold Varner III

19. The leading 50 players on the Official World Golf Ranking as of March 27, 2023

- Jason Day
- Harris English
- Min Woo Lee
- Keith Mitchell

20. Special invitations

- Kazuki Higa
- Gordon Sargent (a)

== Par 3 contest ==
Wednesday, April 5, 2023

Tom Hoge won the Par 3 Contest with a score of 21 (−6). Five holes-in-one were recorded, including one by Hoge on the eighth hole. Séamus Power recorded an ace on consecutive holes to finish his round, becoming the fourth player in the event's history with two holes-in-one in the same year. Bubba Watson and defending champion Scottie Scheffler also made holes-in-one.

== Round summaries ==
=== First round ===
Thursday, April 6, 2023

At the conclusion to the first round, the lead was shared by three players, Viktor Hovland, Brooks Koepka, and Jon Rahm, who returned scores of 65 (7 under par). Rahm began his round with a double-bogey on the first hole after taking four putts; he was nine under par for the remainder of his round, including an eagle on the eighth hole. Hovland had no bogeys in his round; he made five birdies, and an eagle on the second hole. Koepka was five under par through 12 holes and, following a bogey on the thirteenth hole, birdied three of the last four holes to tie for the lead.

Cameron Young made a birdie on each of the first three holes and finished on 67 (5 under par), alongside Jason Day in a tie for fourth place. Reigning U.S. Amateur champion Sam Bennett started his round with a birdie on the first hole and an eagle on the second; he made another birdie on the sixth hole followed by twelve straight pars for a four under par round of 68. He was the first amateur to be placed in the top 10 after the first round since Ryan Moore in 2005. He was part of a seven-way tie for sixth place along with defending champion Scottie Scheffler, Sam Burns, Shane Lowry, Xander Schauffele, Adam Scott and Gary Woodland.

63-year-old Fred Couples, the 1992 champion, scored 71 (1 under par), as did 2020 champion Dustin Johnson and three-time champion Phil Mickelson. Rory McIlroy made five birdies, three bogeys and a double-bogey to finish on 72 (even par). Tiger Woods bogeyed three of the first seven holes and was three over par before making birdies on the 15th and 16th holes; he made another bogey on the 18th to finish on 74, in a tie for 54th place.

Two players withdrew from the tournament. Kevin Na was unwell and stopped playing after nine holes, and Will Zalatoris withdrew prior to the start of his round with an injury.

Place	Player	Score	To par
T1	(Norway) Viktor Hovland	65	−7
T1	(United States) Brooks Koepka	65	−7
T1	(Spain) Jon Rahm	65	−7
T4	(Australia) Jason Day	67	−5
T4	(United States) Cameron Young	67	−5
T6	(United States) Sam Bennett (a)	68	−4
T6	(United States) Sam Burns	68	−4
T6	(Republic of Ireland) Shane Lowry	68	−4
T6	(United States) Xander Schauffele	68	−4
T6	(United States) Scottie Scheffler	68	−4
T6	(Australia) Adam Scott	68	−4
T6	(United States) Gary Woodland	68	−4

=== Second round ===
Friday, April 7, 2023
Saturday, April 8, 2023

On Friday, tee times were moved forward 30 minutes to accommodate possible inclement weather. The second round of the tournament was suspended twice on Friday due to the threat of approaching thunderstorms; with play being suspended for the day following the second stoppage and resuming on Saturday. A few moments before the second suspension, three trees fell near the 17th tee.

Brooks Koepka made three birdies and an eagle in a round of 67 (5 under par) to take a two-shot lead after 36 holes. Koepka's total of 132 (12 under par) was the third-best 36-hole score in Masters history, behind Jordan Spieth in 2015 and Raymond Floyd in 1976. Jon Rahm was two under par for his round, three behind Koepka, when play was suspended for the day on Friday; having resumed his round on Saturday morning, he made three birdies and two bogeys on the back nine to finish at 134 (10 under par), two off the lead and in second place. It was the first time in Masters history that two players finished the second round double-digits under par.

Sam Bennett had a second round of 68 to lie in third place, four behind Koepka. His two-round total of 136 (8 under par) was the best by an amateur through 36 holes since Ken Venturi in 1956, and he was the first amateur to finish the second round inside the top three on the leaderboard since Ricky Barnes in 2003. Viktor Hovland and Collin Morikawa were tied for fourth place on 138 (6 under par), with Sam Burns, Jason Day, Jordan Spieth and Cameron Young a further stroke behind in a tie for sixth place.

The cut came at 147 (3 over par), with 54 players making it to the weekend. Tiger Woods finished at three over par after bogeys on his final two holes but made the cut for the record-tying 23rd consecutive Masters. Fred Couples, the 1992 champion, made the cut at +1, becoming the oldest player to make the cut at the Masters at the age of 63 years, six months. He surpassed Bernhard Langer, who had set the record in 2020 at 63 years, two months. Notable players to miss the cut included reigning PGA Champion Justin Thomas, 2020 U.S. Open champion Bryson DeChambeau, and four-time major champion and world number two Rory McIlroy. Larry Mize and Sandy Lyle, champions in 1987 and 1988, both missed the cut in their final Masters appearances.

There was one withdrawal during the second round: Louis Oosthuizen, who withdrew prior to the resumption of play on Saturday, having completed 17 holes on Friday before play was suspended.

Place	Player	Score	To par
1	(United States) Brooks Koepka	65-67=132	−12
2	(Spain) Jon Rahm	65-69=134	−10
3	(United States) Sam Bennett (a)	68-68=136	−8
T4	(Norway) Viktor Hovland	65-73=138	−6
T4	(United States) Collin Morikawa	69-69=138	−6
T6	(United States) Sam Burns	68-71=139	−5
T6	(Australia) Jason Day	67-72=139	−5
T6	(United States) Jordan Spieth	69-70=139	−5
T6	(United States) Cameron Young	67-72=139	−5
T10	(United States) Russell Henley	73-67=140	−4
T10	(Republic of Ireland) Shane Lowry	68-72=140	−4
T10	(United States) Phil Mickelson	71-69=140	−4
T10	(Chile) Joaquín Niemann	71-69=140	−4
T10	(England) Justin Rose	69-71=140	−4
T10	(United States) Gary Woodland	68-72=140	−4

=== Third round ===
Saturday, April 8, 2023
Sunday, April 9, 2023

With persistent rain causing several greens to become unplayable due to flooding, play was suspended for the day at 3:16 pm Eastern time on Saturday. At the time, Brooks Koepka was leading by 4 strokes over playing partner Jon Rahm, with both men on the seventh green.

When play resumed on Sunday, Koepka's lead was quickly halved as he made a bogey and a birdie on the seventh and eighth holes, while Rahm made two birdies. The lead was reduced to one stroke on the 12th hole when Koepka made a bogey. Further bogeys by Rahm at the 13th and 16th holes, and by Koepka on the 17th meant both players were round in 73 strokes (1 over par) and Koepka took a two-stroke lead into the final round later in the day.

Viktor Hovland was three over par on his round through ten holes but made five consecutive birdies on holes 11 through 15 to finish at 70 (2 under par) and move up to third place, one stroke behind Rahm. Patrick Cantlay made three straight birdies on the front nine and three more on the back in a round of 68 (4 under par) to move into fourth place. Hideki Matsuyama, the 2021 champion, began his round with a bogey and double-bogey but was five under par for holes 8 through 15, which lifted him into a tie for fifth place with Russell Henley. Sam Bennett made only one birdie in his round of 76 (4 over par) to fall to seventh place alongside Collin Morikawa; he became the first amateur to enter the final round of the Masters inside the top-10 since Deane Beman in 1964.

Tiger Woods withdrew due to injury prior to the resumption of play on Sunday.

Place	Player	Score	To par
1	(United States) Brooks Koepka	65-67-73=205	−11
2	(Spain) Jon Rahm	65-69-73=207	−9
3	(Norway) Viktor Hovland	65-73-70=208	−8
4	(United States) Patrick Cantlay	71-71-68=210	−6
T5	(United States) Russell Henley	73-67-71=211	−5
T5	(Japan) Hideki Matsuyama	71-70-70=211	−5
T7	(United States) Sam Bennett (a)	68-68-76=212	−4
T7	(United States) Collin Morikawa	69-69-74=212	−4
T9	(Australia) Jason Day	67-72-74=213	−3
T9	(Republic of Ireland) Shane Lowry	68-72-73=213	−3
T9	(United States) Patrick Reed	71-70-72=213	−3
T9	(England) Justin Rose	69-71-73=213	−3
T9	(United States) Xander Schauffele	68-74-71=213	−3
T9	(United States) Gary Woodland	68-72-73=213	−3

=== Final round ===
Sunday, April 9, 2023

==== Summary ====
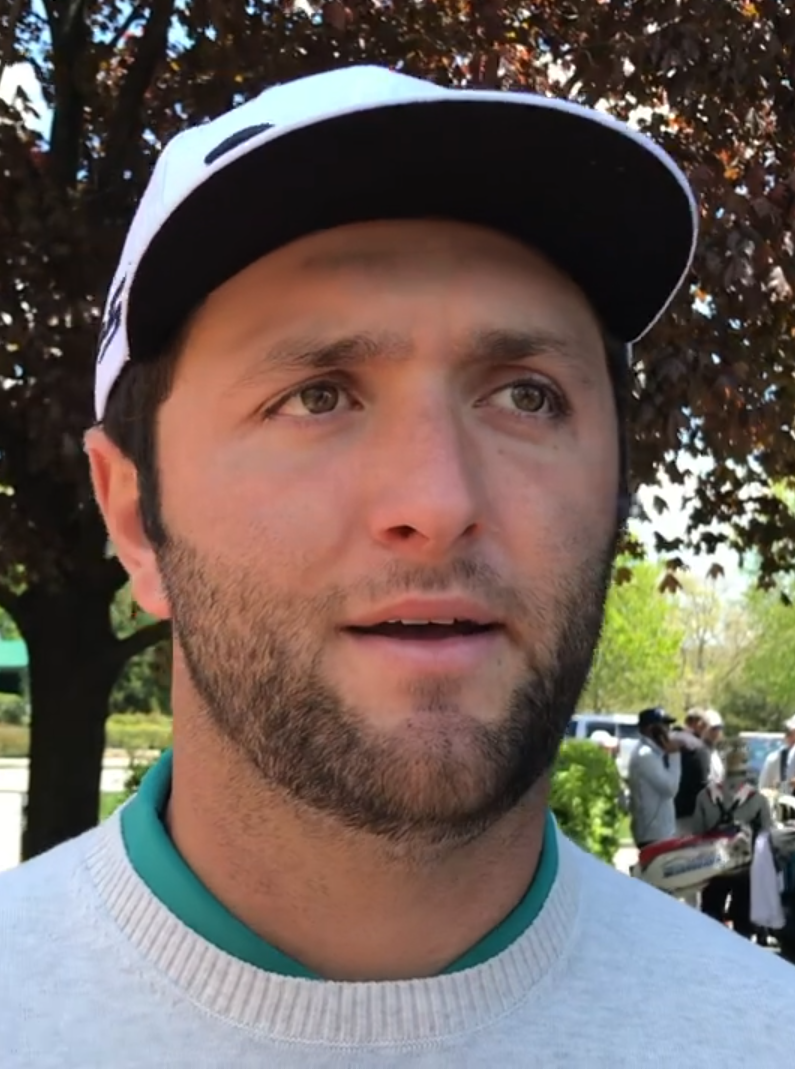
Jon Rahm won his first Masters title.

External videos
- Full final round coverage on CBS on YouTube

Jon Rahm came from two shots behind at the start of the final round to become the fourth Spaniard to win the Masters title.

Rahm birdied the third hole and tied Brooks Koepka for the lead when Koepka missed a par putt on the fourth. Koepka also bogeyed the sixth hole and Rahm took a two-shot lead when he chipped to four feet on the par-5 eighth hole and made the putt for birdie, while Koepka missed a long birdie putt after being forced to chip out from the trees off his drive. Both players bogeyed the ninth hole, Rahm when his approach shot spun off the front of the green into the fairway. Koepka added another bogey on the par-3 12th when his tee shot went over the green and he left his chip shot short. Now leading Koepka by three shots, Rahm chipped to within five feet on the par-5 13th and made birdie, while Koepka also birdied the hole after getting up and down from off the green, his first birdie in 23 holes.

Rahm hit his approach into the 14th hole to four feet and made the putt to get to 12-under for the tournament. He parred his last four holes, including an up-and-down from short of the green on the 18th, to win his second major championship and first career Masters with a three-under 69. Koepka, meanwhile, three-putted for bogey on 14 to fall to third place but made consecutive birdies on holes 15–16 to get back to nine-under. Another bogey on the 17th left him at eight-under for the tournament with a three-over 75 in the final round.

Three-time champion Phil Mickelson began the final round 10 shots off the lead before going two-under on his front nine. He holed a 23-foot putt for birdie on the 12th and two-putted for birdie on both the 13th and 15th. At the 17th, his approach shot settled within a foot of the hole for another birdie. He then closed his round with an 11-foot putt for birdie on the 18th, finishing with a seven-under 65 to tie Koepka for second place. The round tied Mickelson's best career score at the Masters and was the lowest by a player over the age of 50. He also became the oldest player to finish in the top-five at the Masters, surpassing the record of Jimmy Demaret in 1962.

Jordan Spieth, the 2015 champion, was playing with Mickelson and made six birdies from holes 8 to 17 as he went seven-under on his round before a bogey at the last. He finished with a 66 (−6) and tied for fourth place, his nine birdies tying the Masters record for most in a final round. Another past champion, Patrick Reed, double-bogeyed the second hole but made six birdies over his next 11 holes. He also birdied the 18th hole to shoot 68 (−4) and tie Spieth for fourth, along with Russell Henley.

Viktor Hovland, who began the round three shots off the lead, did not make a birdie until the 13th and double-bogeyed the sixth as he fell back with a two-over 74, finishing tied for seventh place. Cameron Young eagled the 13th and birdied 17 to get to seven-under, but dropped back to six-under with a closing bogey to tie Hovland. Sahith Theegala, playing in his first Masters, chipped in for birdie on the 16th as he shot 67 (−5) to climb into the top 10 and finish alone in ninth place. Defending champion Scottie Scheffler was four-under on his round and within four shots of the lead before hitting his tee shot on the 12th into the bushes over the green, leading to a double-bogey after taking a drop; he finished at four-under, tied for 10th place. Sam Bennett began the round in seventh place but made only one birdie as he shot 74 (+2). His 16th-place finish was the best by an amateur since Ryan Moore was 13th in 2005.

==== Final leaderboard ====
Champion
(a) = amateur
(c) = past champion

Top 10
Place	Player	Score	To par	Prize money (US$)
1	(Spain) Jon Rahm	65-69-73-69=276	−12	3,240,000
T2	(United States) Brooks Koepka	65-67-73-75=280	−8	1,584,000
T2	(United States) Phil Mickelson (c)	71-69-75-65=280	−8	1,584,000
T4	(United States) Russell Henley	73-67-71-70=281	−7	744,000
T4	(United States) Patrick Reed (c)	71-70-72-68=281	−7	744,000
T4	(United States) Jordan Spieth (c)	69-70-76-66=281	−7	744,000
T7	(Norway) Viktor Hovland	65-73-70-74=282	−6	580,500
T7	(United States) Cameron Young	67-72-75-68=282	−6	580,500
9	(United States) Sahith Theegala	73-70-73-67=283	−5	522,000
T10	(England) Matt Fitzpatrick	70-72-72-70=284	−4	432,000
T10	(United States) Collin Morikawa	69-69-74-72=284	−4	432,000
T10	(United States) Xander Schauffele	68-74-71-71=284	−4	432,000
T10	(United States) Scottie Scheffler (c)	68-75-71-70=284	−4	432,000

Leaderboard below the top 10
Place	Player	Score	To par	Money ($)
T14	(United States) Patrick Cantlay	71-71-68-75=285	−3	333,000
T14	(United States) Gary Woodland	68-72-73-72=285	−3	333,000
T16	(United States) Sam Bennett (a)	68-68-76-74=286	−2	0
T16	(South Korea) Im Sung-jae	71-76-67-72=286	−2	261,000
T16	(South Korea) Tom Kim	70-72-74-70=286	−2	261,000
T16	(Republic of Ireland) Shane Lowry	68-72-73-73=286	−2	261,000
T16	(Japan) Hideki Matsuyama (c)	71-70-70-75=286	−2	261,000
T16	(Chile) Joaquín Niemann	71-69-74-72=286	−2	261,000
T16	(England) Justin Rose	69-71-73-73=286	−2	261,000
T23	(United States) Keegan Bradley	70-72-74-71=287	−1	187,200
T23	(United States) Chris Kirk	70-74-72-71=287	−1	187,200
T23	(South Korea) Lee Kyoung-hoon	74-67-74-72=287	−1	187,200
T26	(United States) Tony Finau	69-74-73-72=288	E	147,000
T26	(New Zealand) Ryan Fox	70-71-74-73=288	E	147,000
T26	(United States) Scott Stallings	70-77-69-72=288	E	147,000
T29	(United States) Sam Burns	68-71-78-72=289	+1	125,100
T29	(Canada) Mackenzie Hughes	76-69-74-70=289	+1	125,100
T29	(South Korea) Kim Si-woo	73-72-72-72=289	+1	125,100
T29	(United States) Harold Varner III	72-71-76-70=289	+1	125,100
33	(England) Tommy Fleetwood	72-71-74-74=291	+3	111,600
T34	(United States) Talor Gooch	72-74-73-73=292	+4	97,200
T34	(England) Tyrrell Hatton	71-73-72-76=292	+4	97,200
T34	(United States) Zach Johnson (c)	75-70-74-73=292	+4	97,200
T34	(United States) J. T. Poston	74-72-76-70=292	+4	97,200
T34	(Australia) Cameron Smith	70-72-75-75=292	+4	97,200
T39	(Mexico) Abraham Ancer	72-71-74-76=293	+5	79,200
T39	(Australia) Jason Day	67-72-74-80=293	+5	79,200
T39	(United States) Taylor Moore	73-72-70-78=293	+5	79,200
T39	(Australia) Adam Scott (c)	68-74-77-74=293	+5	79,200
T43	(United States) Harris English	71-71-77-75=294	+6	66,600
T43	(United States) Max Homa	71-73-72-78=294	+6	66,600
T43	(Chile) Mito Pereira	74-70-77-73=294	+6	66,600
T46	(Republic of Ireland) Séamus Power	73-72-73-77=295	+7	57,600
T46	(Austria) Sepp Straka	70-73-74-78=295	+7	57,600
T48	(United States) Dustin Johnson (c)	71-72-78-75=296	+8	50,760
T48	(Belgium) Thomas Pieters	74-73-72-77=296	+8	50,760
T50	(United States) Fred Couples (c)	71-74-76-76=297	+9	46,080
T50	(South Africa) Charl Schwartzel (c)	74-73-73-77=297	+9	46,080
52	(United States) Billy Horschel	73-74-74-79=300	+12	44,280
53	(United States) Keith Mitchell	75-71-77-79=302	+14	43,200
CUT	(United States) Bryson DeChambeau	74-74=148	+4	
CUT	(United States) Tom Hoge	74-74=148	+4	
CUT	(Italy) Francesco Molinari	72-76=148	+4	
CUT	(United States) Justin Thomas	70-78=148	+4	
CUT	(Canada) Mike Weir (c)	72-76=148	+4	
CUT	(United States) Ben Carr (a)	75-74=149	+5	
CUT	(United States) Kevin Kisner	72-77=149	+5	
CUT	(Germany) Bernhard Langer (c)	75-74=149	+5	
CUT	(Northern Ireland) Rory McIlroy	72-77=149	+5	
CUT	(Poland) Adrian Meronk	73-76=149	+5	
CUT	(United States) Cameron Champ	76-74=150	+6	
CUT	(Japan) Kazuki Higa	76-74=150	+6	
CUT	(Australia) Min Woo Lee	75-75=150	+6	
CUT	(Fiji) Vijay Singh (c)	75-75=150	+6	
CUT	(England) Danny Willett (c)	75-75=150	+6	
CUT	(Argentina) Mateo Fernández de Oliveira (a)	76-75=151	+7	
CUT	(Spain) Sergio García (c)	74-77=151	+7	
CUT	(United States) Brian Harman	77-74=151	+7	
CUT	(Northern Ireland) Matthew McClean (a)	77-74=151	+7	
CUT	(South Africa) Aldrich Potgieter (a)	77-74=151	+7	
CUT	(Canada) Corey Conners	73-79=152	+8	
CUT	(Australia) Harrison Crowe (a)	75-77=152	+8	
CUT	(United States) Kurt Kitayama	75-77=152	+8	
CUT	(United States) Jason Kokrak	73-79=152	+8	
CUT	(Sweden) Alex Norén	78-75=153	+9	
CUT	(United States) Gordon Sargent (a)	77-76=153	+9	
CUT	(United States) Bubba Watson (c)	77-76=153	+9	
CUT	(Spain) José María Olazábal (c)	77-77=154	+10	
CUT	(Canada) Adam Svensson	75-80=155	+11	
CUT	(United States) Larry Mize (c)	79-80=159	+15	
CUT	(Scotland) Sandy Lyle (c)	81-83=164	+20	
WD	(United States) Tiger Woods (c)	74-73 (Note: Woods withdrew prior to the resumption of play on Sunday having completed 7 holes of his third round.)=147	+9	
WD	(South Africa) Louis Oosthuizen	76-71 (Note: Oosthuizen withdrew prior to the resumption of play on Saturday having completed 17 holes of his second round.)=147	+7	
WD	(United States) Kevin Na	(Note: Na withdrew having completed 9 holes of his first round.)	+4	

==== Scorecard ====
Hole	1	2	3	4	5	6	7	8	9	10	11	12	13	14	15	16	17	18
Par	4	5	4	3	4	3	4	5	4	4	4	3	5	4	5	3	4	4
(Spain) Rahm	−9	−9	−10	−10	−10	−10	−10	−11	−10	−10	−10	−10	−11	−12	−12	−12	−12	−12
(United States) Koepka	−11	−11	−11	−10	−10	−9	−9	−9	−8	−8	−8	−7	−8	−7	−8	−9	−8	−8
(United States) Mickelson	−1	−2	−2	−2	−1	−2	−3	−3	−3	−3	−3	−4	−5	−5	−6	−6	−7	−8
(United States) Henley	−5	−6	−7	−7	−6	−6	−6	−6	−7	−7	−7	−7	−7	−7	−7	−7	−7	−7
(United States) Reed	−3	−1	−2	−2	−2	−3	−4	−5	−5	−5	−5	−6	−7	−6	−7	−7	−6	−7
(United States) Spieth	−2	−3	−3	−2	−3	−2	−2	−3	−4	−5	−5	−5	−5	−6	−7	−7	−8	−7
(Norway) Hovland	−8	−8	−8	−8	−8	−6	−6	−6	−5	−5	−5	−5	−6	−5	−5	−5	−6	−6
(United States) Young	−3	−4	−4	—4	−5	−5	−5	−5	−5	−5	−5	−4	−6	−6	−6	−6	−7	−6
(United States) Theegala	−1	−2	−2	−3	−3	−3	−3	−4	−3	−4	−4	−4	−4	−4	−5	−6	−5	−5
(United States) Scheffler	−2	−3	−4	−4	−4	−4	−4	−4	−5	−5	−6	−4	−4	−4	−5	−5	−4	−4
(United States) Bennett	−4	−4	−4	−4	−4	−4	−4	−3	−3	−3	−3	−2	−3	−3	−3	−3	−3	−2

Cumulative tournament scores, relative to par

Eagle	Birdie	Bogey	Double bogey
