= Callum Tarren =

English professional golfer (born 1990)

Personal information
- Nationality: England
- Born: 2 October 1990 (age 36) Darlington, England
- Height: 6 ft 0 in (183 cm)
- Weight: 185 lb (84 kg)
- Life partner: Ashleigh McKenna
- Children: 1

Career
- Sport: Golf
- College: Radford University
- Turned professional: 2015
- Current tours: European Tour; Challenge Tour
- Former tours: PGA Tour; Korn Ferry Tour; PGA Tour China; China Tour
- Professional wins: 1

Best results in major championships
- Masters Tournament: DNP
- PGA Championship: T29: 2023
- U.S. Open: T31: 2022
- The Open Championship: DNP

Achievements and awards
- PGA Tour China Order of Merit winner: 2018

Callum Tarren (born 2 October 1990) is an English professional golfer who currently plays on the European Tour.

== Amateur career ==
Tarren attended Radford University from 2011 to 2014.

== Professional career ==
Tarren turned professional in 2015 and began to play on PGA Tour China. He won the PGA Tour China Order of Merit in 2018.

Tarren played on the Korn Ferry Tour during 2020–21, gaining status to play on the PGA Tour in the 2021–22 season.

In November 2022, Tarren recorded his best finish to date on the PGA Tour. He finished tied-second at the RSM Classic, finishing two shots behind Adam Svensson.

== Professional wins (1) ==
=== China Tour wins (1) ===
No.	Date	Tournament	Winning score	Margin of victory	Runner-up
1	12 Nov 2017	Jiangsu Open	−3 (72-71-73-69=285)	1 stroke	(China) Cao Yi

== Results in major championships ==
Results not in chronological order in 2020.

Tournament	2019	2020	2021	2022	2023
Masters Tournament					
PGA Championship					T29
U.S. Open	CUT			T31	
The Open Championship		NT			

Did not play

CUT = missed the half-way cut
"T" indicates a tie for a place
NT = No tournament due to COVID-19 pandemic

== Results in The Players Championship ==
Tournament	2023	2024
The Players Championship	CUT	CUT

CUT = missed the halfway cut

== See also ==
- 2021 Korn Ferry Tour Finals graduates
