= Jared Wolfe =

American professional golfer (born 1988)

Personal information
- Nationality: United States
- Born: April 7, 1988 (age 38) Louisville, Kentucky, U.S.
- Height: 6 ft 4 in (1.93 m)
- Weight: 195 lb (88 kg; 13.9 st)

Career
- Sport: Golf
- College: Murray State
- Turned professional: 2010
- Current tour: Korn Ferry Tour
- Former tours: PGA Tour; PGA Tour Canada; PGA Tour Latinoamérica
- Professional wins: 5

Number of wins by tour
- Korn Ferry Tour: 2
- Other: 3

Jared Wolfe (born April 7, 1988) is an American professional golfer.

Wolfe played on the Web.com Tour in 2014, the PGA Tour Canada in 2015 and the PGA Tour Latinoamérica in 2017. He won the inaugural BMW Jamaica Classic on the PGA Tour Latinoamérica, played in June 2017. He finished second in the PGA Tour Latinoamérica Order of Merit in 2017 to earn a Web.com Tour card for 2018.

== Professional wins (5) ==
=== Korn Ferry Tour wins (2) ===
No.	Date	Tournament	Winning score	Margin of victory	Runner-up
1	Jan 22, 2020	The Bahamas Great Abaco Classic	−18 (67-69-65-69=270)	4 strokes	(United States) Brandon Harkins
2	Sep 27, 2020	Wichita Open	−16 (63-65-65-71=264)	1 stroke	(Canada) Taylor Pendrith

=== PGA Tour Latinoamérica wins (3) ===
No.	Date	Tournament	Winning score	Margin of victory	Runners-up
1	Jun 18, 2017	BMW Jamaica Classic	−21 (64-64-67-72=267)	1 stroke	(Mexico) José de Jesús Rodríguez, (Mexico) Gerardo Ruiz
2	Oct 14, 2018	Volvo Abierto de Chile	−14 (64-72-67-67=270)	2 strokes	(Chile) Felipe Aguilar, (Argentina) Estanislao Goya, (Chile) Horacio León
3	Mar 30, 2019	Buenaventura Classic	−13 (66-68-71-70=275)	5 strokes	(United States) Mitchell Meissner, (Chile) Mito Pereira, (Australia) Ryan Ruffels

== Team appearances ==
Professional

- Aruba Cup (representing PGA Tour Latinoamérica): 2017

== See also ==
- 2021 Korn Ferry Tour Finals graduates
