= 2021 Korn Ferry Tour Finals graduates =

This is a list of golfers who graduated from the Korn Ferry Tour and Korn Ferry Tour Finals in 2021. Due to the COVID-19 pandemic, there was no graduating class in 2020, and the 2020 Korn Ferry Tour season extended into 2021. The top 25 players on the 2020–21 Korn Ferry Tour regular-season points list earned PGA Tour cards for 2021–22. The Finals determined the other 25 players to earn PGA Tour cards and the initial priority order of all 50.

As in previous seasons, the Finals featured the top 75 players on the Korn Ferry Tour regular season points list, players ranked 126–200 on the PGA Tour's regular-season FedEx Cup points list (except players exempt through other means), non-members of the PGA Tour with enough regular-season FedEx Cup points to place 126–200, and special medical exemptions. Since the Finals were not held in 2020, PGA Tour players who finished outside the top 200 of the FedEx Cup in 2021 but inside the top 200 in 2020 are eligible to compete; non-members who earned enough points in 2020 to equal 200th place in 2021 were also eligible.

To determine the initial 2021–22 PGA Tour priority rank, the 25 Korn Ferry Tour regular-season graduates were alternated with the 25 Finals graduates. This priority order was then reshuffled several times during the 2021–22 season based on the FedEx Cup standings.

Stephan Jäger and Joseph Bramlett were fully exempt for the 2021–22 PGA Tour season after leading the full-season and Finals points lists, respectively. Mito Pereira was also fully exempt due to winning three times during the Korn Ferry Tour season, as was Will Zalatoris due to FedEx Cup points earned as a non-member in the 2021 PGA Tour season.

== 2021 Korn Ferry Tour Finals ==
Player	2020–21 Korn Ferry Tour regular season		2021 FedEx Cup	2021 Korn Ferry Tour Finals			The 25 Regular + Finals		Priority rank
Player	Rank	Points	2021 FedEx Cup	Rank	Without The 25	Points	Rank	Points	Priority rank
(United States) Will Zalatoris^{†}	9	1876		n/a		0	14	1876	Exempt
(Germany) Stephan Jäger	1	2804		4		720	1	3524	Exempt
(United States) Joseph Bramlett	106	408	146	1	1	1139			Exempt
(Chile) Mito Pereira*^{#}	2	2556	180	n/a		0	5	2556	Exempt
(United States) Greyson Sigg*	6	2125		3		1037	2	3162	1
(United States) Trey Mullinax	49	883		5	2	700			2
(Canada) Adam Svensson	11	1821		2		1138	3	2959	3
(England) Aaron Rai*				6	3	535			4
(United States) Chad Ramey*	3	2480		13		388	4	2868	5
(United States) Bronson Burgoon			158	7	4	528			6
(South Africa) Christiaan Bezuidenhout^{†}				8	5	525			7
(United States) Taylor Moore*	4	2271		19		262	6	2533	8
(United States) J. J. Spaun			174	9	6	490			9
(Canada) Taylor Pendrith*	5	2154		42		115	7	2269	10
(United States) Hayden Buckley*	32	1259		10	7	415			11
(United States) Lee Hodges*	10	1851		18		263	8	2114	12
(United States) Sahith Theegala*	152	173		11	8	400			13
(United States) Davis Riley*	7	2006		60		80	9	2086	14
(Austria) Matthias Schwab*				12	9	398			15
(United States) David Lipsky*	12	1782		25		211	10	1993	16
(United States) Vince Whaley	208	56	140	14	10	362			17
(France) Paul Barjon*	15	1729		28		205	11	1935	18
(United States) John Huh			153	15	11	351			19
(United States) Max McGreevy*	14	1732		34		160	12	1892	20
(United States) Alex Smalley*				16	12	319			21
(United States) Jared Wolfe*	8	1880		n/a		0	13	1880	22
(United States) Joshua Creel*	34	1224		17	13	299			23
(Australia) Lucas Herbert^{†}				20	14	261			24
(United States) Dylan Wu*	17	1675		36		159	15	1834	25
(England) Callum Tarren*	42	1075		21	15	261			26
(United States) Brandon Wu*	13	1735		59		82	16	1817	27
(United States) Scott Gutschewski	56	837		22	16	240			28
(United States) Cameron Young*	19	1642		31		166	17	1808	29
(South Africa) Dawie van der Walt	38	1104		23	17	229			30
(United States) Andrew Novak*	16	1692		46		106	18	1799	31
(United States) Kelly Kraft	T284	6	207	26	18	209			32
(United States) Ben Kohles	23	1497		24		217	19	1714	33
(Canada) Michael Gligic	T303	4	145	27	19	206			34
(United States) Seth Reeves	18	1651		T116		7	20	1658	35
(United States) Patrick Rodgers			128	29	20	182			36
(United States) Nick Hardy*	20	1597		T71		58	21	1654	37
(Thailand) Kiradech Aphibarnrat			196	30	21	175			38
(England) David Skinns*	22	1547		T96		18	22	1565	39
(United States) Kurt Kitayama^{†}				T32	T22	164			40
(United States) Curtis Thompson*	21	1549		105		13	23	1562	41
(United States) Austin Cook			136	T32	T22	164			42
(Australia) Brett Drewitt	24	1487		64		75	24	1561	43
(United States) Peter Uihlein	28	1412	175	35	24	160			44
(United States) Austin Smotherman*	25	1439		74		49	25	1488	45
(United States) Justin Lower*	30	1332		37	25	158			46

*PGA Tour rookie in 2021–22
^{†}First-time PGA Tour member in 2021–22, but ineligible for rookie status due to having played eight or more PGA Tour events as a professional in a previous season
^{#}Received a three-win promotion to the PGA Tour during 2020–21 season

- Earned spot in Finals through PGA Tour.
- Earned spot in Finals through FedEx Cup points earned as a PGA Tour non-member.
- Earned spot in Finals through a medical extension.
- Indicates whether the player earned his card through the regular season or through the Finals.

== Results on 2021–22 PGA Tour ==
Player	Starts	Cuts made	Best finish	Money list rank	Earnings ($)	FedEx Cup rank
(United States) Will Zalatoris^{†}	24	19	Win	3	9,405,082	28
(Germany) Stephan Jäger	31	15	5	100	1,289,503	83
(United States) Joseph Bramlett	29	14	T20	172	409,468	156
(Chile) Mito Pereira*	27	18	3/T3 (x2)	46	2,797,925	46
(United States) Greyson Sigg*	30	18	T7	137	884,085	102
(United States) Trey Mullinax	28	14	Win	61	2,172,365	30
(Canada) Adam Svensson	31	20	6	106	1,209,000	86
(England) Aaron Rai*	28	19	T4	94	1,346,601	82
(United States) Chad Ramey*	28	11	Win	102	1,281,224	74
(United States) Bronson Burgoon	13	5	T16	205	192,026	185
(South Africa) Christiaan Bezuidenhout^{†}	24	20	T2	60	2,233,289	47
(United States) Taylor Moore*	28	18	T4	75	1,751,237	61
(United States) J. J. Spaun	29	19	Win	39	2,951,152	31
(Canada) Taylor Pendrith*	21	16	T2	56	2,330,840	44
(United States) Hayden Buckley*	30	17	T4	99	1,303,036	92
(United States) Lee Hodges*	29	18	T4	90	1,377,251	66
(United States) Sahith Theegala*	32	26	T2	34	3,124,668	26
(United States) Davis Riley*	29	20	2	33	3,190,793	33
(Austria) Matthias Schwab*	23	15	T7 (x2)	130	955,840	114
(United States) David Lipsky*	29	17	T4	103	1,269,468	78
(United States) Vince Whaley	29	16	5	121	1,039,817	97
(France) Paul Barjon*	26	11	10	168	436,732	153
(United States) John Huh	26	14	T2	83	1,631,948	67
(United States) Max McGreevy*	28	9	2	127	1,039,817	106
(United States) Alex Smalley*	30	17	T2	84	1,631,567	64
(United States) Jared Wolfe*	23	7	T28	206	189,112	184
(United States) Joshua Creel*	22	4	T16	218	115,976	195
(Australia) Lucas Herbert^{†}	20	10	Win	50	2,558,440	41
(United States) Dylan Wu*	25	11	T10	174	382,717	150
(England) Callum Tarren*	26	12	T5	122	1,034,362	105
(United States) Brandon Wu*	26	12	T2	88	1,472,515	72
(United States) Scott Gutschewski	23	8	5	180	351,321	158
(United States) Cameron Young*	25	18	2/T2 (x5)	10	6,520,598	18
(South Africa) Dawie van der Walt	25	7	T22	209	184,972	189
(United States) Andrew Novak*	26	12	T11	163	513,881	139
(United States) Kelly Kraft	27	11	T11	149	680,946	125
(United States) Ben Kohles	24	10	T13	186	309,955	161
(Canada) Michael Gligic	24	16	T10	151	652,204	129
(United States) Seth Reeves	26	9	T8	175	376,574	159
(United States) Patrick Rodgers	27	17	4	96	1,327,382	84
(United States) Nick Hardy*	21	12	T8	142	820,728	126
(Thailand) Kiradech Aphibarnrat	19	10	T13	190	299,174	171
(England) David Skinns*	23	11	T29	195	243,143	178
(United States) Kurt Kitayama^{†}	24	12	2/T2 (x2)	51	2,547,912	38
(United States) Curtis Thompson*	27	9	T7	183	338,509	166
(United States) Austin Cook	25	12	T11	160	552,226	143
(Australia) Brett Drewitt	23	7	T39	216	121,307	197
(United States) Peter Uihlein	15	7	T34	213	142,276	n/a
(United States) Austin Smotherman*	25	16	8	145	770,827	121
(United States) Justin Lower*	24	15	T8	148	700,545	122

*PGA Tour rookie in 2022
^{†}First-time PGA Tour member in 2022, but ineligible for rookie status due to having played eight or more PGA Tour events in a previous season

- Retained his PGA Tour card for 2023: won or finished in the top 125 of the adjusted FedEx Cup points list.
- Retained PGA Tour conditional status and qualified for the Web.com Tour Finals: finished between 126 and 150 on the adjusted FedEx Cup list.
- Failed to retain his PGA Tour card for 2023 but qualified for the Web.com Tour Finals: finished between 150 and 200 on the adjusted FedEx Cup list through the Finals entry deadline.
- Failed to retain his PGA Tour card for 2023 and to qualify for the Web.com Tour Finals: was outside the top 200 on the adjusted FedEx Cup list at the Finals entry deadline.

For the purposes of determining eligibility, the FedEx Cup standings were adjusted to remove all players who were suspended for participating in LIV Golf (and had not resigned PGA Tour membership), including Uihlein. No adjusted money list was released.

Nick Hardy, Michael Gligic, Austin Cook, and Joseph Bramlett regained their cards through the 2022 Korn Ferry Tour Finals.

== Wins on the PGA Tour in 2021–22 ==
No.	Date	Player	Tournament	Winning score	Margin of victory	Runner(s)-up	Payout ($)
1	Oct 31, 2021	(Australia) Lucas Herbert	Butterfield Bermuda Championship	−15 (70-65-65-69=269)	1 stroke	(New Zealand) Danny Lee (United States) Patrick Reed	1,170,000
2	Mar 27	(United States) Chad Ramey	Corales Puntacana Championship	−17 (70-65-69-67=271)	1 stroke	(United States) Ben Martin (United States) Alex Smalley	666,000
3	Apr 3	(United States) J. J. Spaun	Valero Texas Open	−13 (67-70-69-69=275)	2 strokes	(Australia) Matt Jones (United States) Matt Kuchar	1,548,000
4	Jul 10	(United States) Trey Mullinax	Barbasol Championship	−25 (65-65-67-66=263)	1 stroke	(United States) Kevin Streelman	666,000
5	Aug 14	(United States) Will Zalatoris	FedEx St. Jude Championship	−15 (71-63-65-66=265)	Playoff	(Austria) Sepp Straka	2,700,000

== Runner-up finishes on the PGA Tour in 2021–22 ==
No.	Date	Player	Tournament	Winner	Winning score	Runner-up score	Payout ($)
1	Oct 3, 2021	(United States) Cameron Young	Sanderson Farms Championship	(United States) Sam Burns	−22 (68-66-65-67=266)	−21 (67-65-67-68=267)	623,000
2	Jan 29	(United States) Will Zalatoris	Farmers Insurance Open	(United States) Luke List	−15 (67-68-72-66=273)	−15 (69-68-65-71=273)	915,000
3	Feb 20	(United States) Cameron Young (2)	Genesis Invitational	(Chile) Joaquín Niemann	−19 (63-63-68-71=265)	−17 (66-62-69-70=267)	1,068,000
4	Mar 6	(United States) Max McGreevy	Puerto Rico Open	(United States) Ryan Brehm	−20 (66-67-68-67=268)	−14 (70-64-71-69=274)	403,300
5	Mar 20	(United States) Davis Riley	Valspar Championship	(United States) Sam Burns	−17 (64-67-67-69=267)	−17 (65-68-62-72=267)	850,200
6	Mar 27	(United States) Alex Smalley	Corales Puntacana Championship	(United States) Chad Ramey	−17 (70-65-69-67=271)	−16 (69-65-73-65=272)	329,300
7 & 8	May 1	(United States) Kurt Kitayama	Mexico Open	(Spain) Jon Rahm	−17 (64-66-68-69=267)	−16 (64-70-66-68=268)	552,367
7 & 8	May 1	(United States) Brandon Wu	Mexico Open	(Spain) Jon Rahm	−17 (64-66-68-69=267)	−16 (69-70-66-63=268)	552,367
9	May 8	(United States) Cameron Young (3)	Wells Fargo Championship	(United States) Max Homa	−8 (67-72-65-65=272)	−6 (68-71-69-66=274)	681,000
10	May 22	(United States) Will Zalatoris (2)	PGA Championship	(United States) Justin Thomas	−5 (67-67-74-67=275)	−5 (66-65-73-71=275)	1,620,000
11	Jun 19	(United States) Will Zalatoris (3)	U.S. Open	(England) Matt Fitzpatrick	−6 (68-70-68-68=274)	−5 (69-70-67-69=275)	1,557,687
12	Jun 26	(United States) Sahith Theegala	Travelers Championship	(United States) Xander Schauffele	−19 (63-63-67-68=261)	−17 (67-65-64-67=263)	738,700
13	Jul 3	(South Africa) Christiaan Bezuidenhout	John Deere Classic	(United States) J. T. Poston	−21 (62-65-67-69=263)	−18 (69-65-66-66=266)	631,900
14	Jul 10	(United States) Kurt Kitayama (2)	Genesis Scottish Open	(United States) Xander Schauffele	−7 (72-65-66-70=273)	−6 (66-71-71-66=274)	872,000
15	Jul 17	(United States) Cameron Young (4)	The Open Championship	(Australia) Cameron Smith	−20 (67-64-73-64=268)	−19 (64-69-71-65=269)	1,455,000
16 & 17	Jul 31	(Canada) Taylor Pendrith	Rocket Mortgage Classic	(United States) Tony Finau	−26 (64-66-65-67=262)	−21 (64-65-66-72=267)	635,600
16 & 17	Jul 31	(United States) Cameron Young (5)	Rocket Mortgage Classic	(United States) Tony Finau	−26 (64-66-65-67=262)	−21 (71-63-65-68=267)	635,600
