= Savannah Golf Championship =

Club Car Championship at The Landings Golf & Athletic Club

Tournament information
- Location: Savannah, Georgia
- Established: 2018
- Courses: The Landings Club (Deer Creek Course)
- Par: 72
- Length: 7,094 yards (6,487 m)
- Tour: Korn Ferry Tour
- Format: Stroke play
- Prize fund: US$1,000,000
- Month played: March

Tournament record score
- Aggregate: 267 Sam Burns (2018); 267 Kevin Dougherty (2020); 267 Evan Harmeling (2020)
- To par: −21 as above

Current champion
- (United States) Davis Lamb

Location map
- Location in the United States Location in Georgia

The Club Car Championship at The Landings Golf & Athletic Club is a golf tournament on the Korn Ferry Tour, played on the Deer Creek Course at The Landings Golf & Athletic Club located on Skidaway Island outside of Savannah, Georgia. It was first played in 2018, and was known until 2021 as the Savannah Golf Championship.

== Winners ==
| Year | Winner | Score | To par | Margin of victory | Runner(s)-up |
Club Car Championship
| 2026 | (United States) Davis Lamb | 269 | −19 | 2 strokes | (United States) John Pak |
| 2025 | (France) Jérémy Gandon | 271 | −17 | Playoff | (United States) Rick Lamb |
| 2024 | (United States) Steven Fisk | 274 | −14 | Playoff | (United States) Rob Oppenheim |
| 2023 | (England) David Skinns | 271 | −17 | 1 stroke | (United States) Shad Tuten (United States) Tom Whitney |
| 2022 | (United States) T. J. Vogel | 271 | −17 | 1 stroke | (United States) Mark Anderson (United States) Ryan Blaum |
| 2021 | (Canada) Adam Svensson | 271 | −17 | Playoff | (United States) Max McGreevy |
Savannah Golf Championship
| 2020 | (United States) Evan Harmeling | 267 | −21 | Playoff | (United States) Kevin Dougherty |
| 2019 | (United States) Dan McCarthy | 272 | −16 | 1 stroke | (United States) Scottie Scheffler |
| 2018 | (United States) Sam Burns | 267 | −21 | 1 stroke | (United States) Roberto Castro |
