= Sahith Theegala =

American professional golfer (born 1997)

Personal information
- Full name: Sahith Reddy Theegala
- Nationality: United States
- Born: December 4, 1997 (age 28) Orange, California, U.S.
- Height: 6 ft 3 in (1.91 m)

Career
- Sport: Golf
- College: Pepperdine University
- Turned professional: 2020
- Current tour: PGA Tour
- Professional wins: 2
- Highest ranking: 11 (June 9, 2024) (as of November 8, 2026)

Number of wins by tour
- PGA Tour: 1
- Other: 1

Best results in major championships
- Masters Tournament: 9th: 2023
- PGA Championship: T12: 2024
- U.S. Open: T11: 2026
- The Open Championship: T34: 2022

Achievements and awards
- Haskins Award: 2020
- Ben Hogan Award: 2020
- Jack Nicklaus Award: 2020

Sahith Reddy Theegala (born December 4, 1997) is an American professional golfer who plays on the PGA Tour.

== Early life ==
Theegala was born in 1997 in Orange, California, to Indian immigrants Muralidhar and Karuna Theegala, and has a younger brother. He is of Telugu descent and was raised in nearby Chino Hills, California; his family came to the United States, from Telangana, India, in the late 1980s.

== Amateur career ==
Theegala was a three-time NCAA All-American at Pepperdine University. In his final year at Pepperdine, Theegala won the Southwestern Invitational, the Alister MacKenzie Invitational, and the Australian Master of the Amateurs. His collegiate career was cut short by the COVID-19 pandemic, which forced the 2020 season to end early, with his Pepperdine team ranked first in the nation.

In 2020, Theegala won the Haskins Award, the Ben Hogan Award, and the Jack Nicklaus Award, becoming just the fifth person ever to win all three awards in the same year.

== Professional career ==
Theegala made his professional debut in June 2020 at the Outlaw Tour's Lone Tree Classic, where he tied for third place. He finished T-14 at the 2020 Safeway Open on the PGA Tour. He finished T-19 at his first Korn Ferry Tour event, the 2021 Chitimacha Louisiana Open. He finished T-9 at MGM Resorts Championship at Paiute.

Theegala also played a few PGA Tour events in 2020–21, mainly on sponsors' exemptions. He received enough points as a non-member to earn a place in the Korn Ferry Tour Finals in 2021. He then finished T-4 at Nationwide Children's Hospital Championship and 6th at Korn Ferry Tour Championship. With consecutive top-10 finishes in the Korn Ferry Tour Finals, Theegala secured his PGA Tour card for 2021–22 season. His first top-ten finish was on the PGA Tour at the Sanderson Farms Championship in October 2021. He finished third at the WM Phoenix Open in February 2022. He finished seventh at the Valspar Championship in March 2022. In June 2022, Theegala tied for second in the Travelers Championship. At the end of the 2021–22 season, Theegala made the Tour Championship by finishing in top 30.

Theegala opened his 2022–23 season with a top-ten finish at the Fortinet Championship in September 2022. He tied for second at the RSM Classic in November 2022, two shots behind winner Adam Svensson. He continued his season with a tied-for-sixth finish at the Genesis Invitational in February 2023.

On September 17, 2023, he earned his first official PGA Tour victory at the Fortinet Championship, finishing at −21 to secure a two-shot victory.

On August 31, 2024, during the third round of the Tour Championship at East Lake Golf Club, Theegala called a 2-shot penalty on himself after noticing that his club touched the sand on his backswing in a bunker. As an effect of the penalty, Theegala finished third instead of tied second and received $2.5 million less prize money.

== Personal life ==
Theegala appeared in the sports documentary series Full Swing, which premiered on Netflix on February 15, 2023.

On October 23, 2026, he married content creator, Julianna Chan in Maui. They met as student athletes at Pepperdine University.

== Amateur wins ==
- 2010 Future Masters 1
- 2011 Junior All-Star at Robinson Ranch
- 2012 Presidents Boys Cup
- 2014 Los Angeles City Championship
- 2017 Southwestern Invitational, Sahalee Players Championship
- 2018 Waves Challenge
- 2019 SCGA Amateur Championship, Alister MacKenzie Invitational
- 2020 Australian Master of the Amateurs, Southwestern Invitational

== Professional wins (2) ==
=== PGA Tour wins (1) ===
No.	Date	Tournament	Winning score	To par	Margin of victory	Runner-up
1	Sep 17, 2023	Fortinet Championship	68-64-67-68=267	−21	2 strokes	(South Korea) Kim Seong-hyeon

=== Other wins (1) ===
No.	Date	Tournament	Winning score	To par	Margin of victory	Runners-up
1	Dec 11, 2022	QBE Shootout (with (United States) Tom Hoge)	60-60-62=182	−34	1 stroke	(United States) Charley Hoffman and (United States) Ryan Palmer

== Results in major championships ==
Tournament	2017	2018
Masters Tournament		
U.S. Open	CUT	
The Open Championship		
PGA Championship		

Tournament	2019	2020	2021	2022	2023	2024	2025	2026
Masters Tournament					9	T45	T29	
PGA Championship					T40	T12		T60
U.S. Open			CUT		T27	T32		T11
The Open Championship		NT		T34	CUT	CUT	CUT	T53

Top 10
Did not play

CUT = missed the halfway cut
"T" = tied
NT = no tournament due to COVID-19 pandemic

=== Summary ===
Tournament	Wins	2nd	3rd	Top-5	Top-10	Top-25	Events	Cuts made
Masters Tournament	0	0	0	0	1	1	3	3
PGA Championship	0	0	0	0	0	1	3	3
U.S. Open	0	0	0	0	0	1	5	3
The Open Championship	0	0	0	0	0	0	5	2
Totals	0	0	0	0	1	3	16	11

- Most consecutive cuts made – 4 (2022 Open Championship – 2023 U.S. Open)
- Longest streak of top-10s – 1 (once)

== Results in The Players Championship ==
Tournament	2022	2023	2024	2025	2026
The Players Championship	CUT	74	T9	T52	T32

Top 10

CUT = missed the halfway cut
"T" indicates a tie for a place

== Results in World Golf Championships ==
Tournament	2023
Match Play	T31

"T" = Tied

== U.S. national team appearances ==
Amateur

- Arnold Palmer Cup: 2018 (winners)

Professional

- Presidents Cup: 2024 (winners)

== See also ==
- 2021 Korn Ferry Tour Finals graduates
