= Evan Harmeling =

American professional golfer (born 1988)

Personal information
- Nationality: United States
- Born: July 29, 1988 (age 38) Boston, Massachusetts, U.S.
- Height: 6 ft 4 in (193 cm)
- Weight: 190 lb (86 kg)
- Spouse: Ariel
- Children: 2

Career
- Sport: Golf
- College: Princeton University
- Turned professional: 2012
- Current tour: Korn Ferry Tour
- Former tours: PGA Tour Canada; PGA Tour Latinoamérica
- Professional wins: 5

Number of wins by tour
- Korn Ferry Tour: 1
- Other: 4

Evan Harmeling (born July 29, 1988) is an American professional golfer.

== Amateur career ==
Harmeling attended Princeton University. He was on the golf team. He later told the Sun Journal, "I played pretty solid. I didn't win any tournaments in college, which is kind of disappointing. We had good teams, but nothing to write home about."

== Professional career ==
In 2012, Harmeling turned professional. The following year, Harmeling won two state opens in New England. In June, won the Massachusetts Open. He donated his $10,000 winners cheque to the survivors of the recent Boston Marathon bombing. Later in the summer he also won the Maine Open, defeating Jesse Speirs and Geoffrey Sisk by one shot.

As of 2024, he has played in 169 events on a number of the PGA Tour's developmental tours: the PGA Tour Latinoamérica, the Korn Ferry Tour, and PGA Tour Canada. In 2019, he won PGA Tour Latinoamérica's BMW Jamaica Classic his first win on any of the developmental tours. The following year, he won the Korn Ferry Tour's Savannah Golf Championship. In addition, he finished in the top 10 in his debut on the PGA Tour at the 2024 Puerto Rico Open.

== Professional wins (5) ==
=== Korn Ferry Tour wins (1) ===
No.	Date	Tournament	Runner-up	Ref.
1	Oct 4, 2020	Savannah Golf Championship	(United States) Kevin Dougherty	

=== PGA Tour Latinoamérica (1) ===
No.	Year	Tournament	Runner-up	Ref.
1	May 19, 2019	BMW Jamaica Classic	(Argentina) Augusto Núñez	

=== Other wins (3) ===
- 2013 Maine Open, Massachusetts Open
- 2026 Massachusetts Open
