= Sam Bennett (golfer) =

American professional golfer (born 1999)

Personal information
- Full name: Samuel Bennett
- Nationality: United States
- Born: December 21, 1999 (age 26) Madisonville, Texas, U.S.
- Height: 5 ft 10 in (1.78 m)

Career
- Sport: Golf
- College: Texas A&M University
- Turned professional: 2023
- Current tour: Korn Ferry Tour

Best results in major championships
- Masters Tournament: T16: 2023
- PGA Championship: DNP
- U.S. Open: T43: 2023
- The Open Championship: DNP

Samuel Bennett (born December 21, 1999) is an American professional golfer from Madisonville, Texas. In 2022, he won the U.S. Amateur.

== Amateur career ==
Bennett began playing golf on a public nine-hole course in his native Madisonville. He attended Madisonville High School, where he was a state champion in 2017.

Bennett enrolled at Texas A&M in 2018. As a junior, he earned All-American honors and represented the American team at the 2021 Arnold Palmer Cup. He was the SEC Player of the Year as a senior in 2022 and was a finalist for the Fred Haskins Award, given to the most outstanding collegiate golfer in the country. He again was named to the 2022 Arnold Palmer Cup team and set a school record for lowest scoring average.

Bennett advanced to the final of the U.S. Amateur in August 2022 at Ridgewood Country Club in Paramus, New Jersey. He defeated Ben Carr, 1 up, to become the first U.S. Amateur champion in Texas A&M history. The win earned Bennett exemptions into the 2023 Masters Tournament and 2023 Open Championship.

Bennett qualified for the 2022 U.S. Open at The Country Club and made the cut, finishing in a tie for 49th place. He played his first PGA Tour event at the Valero Texas Open in 2021, missing the cut. He also played in the Arnold Palmer Invitational in March 2022.

At the 2023 Masters, Bennett opened with a bogey-free round of 68 (−4), the first by an amateur in 30 years. He shot another 68 in the second round and became the first amateur since 2003 to be inside the top three on the leaderboard through 36 holes. He was also the first amateur to shoot two rounds in the 60s at the Masters since Charles Coe in 1961. His 36-hole score of 136 (−8) was the lowest by an amateur since Ken Venturi in 1956. Bennett shot 76 in the third round to fall to seventh place, becoming the first amateur to be inside the top 10 going into the final round since 1964. He finished tied for 16th after a two-over 74 in the final round, the best Masters finish by an amateur since Ryan Moore in 2005.

== Professional career ==
Bennett turned professional in May 2023 following the 2023 NCAA Division I Men's Golf Championship. By finishing fifth in the PGA Tour University rankings, he will be fully exempt on the Korn Ferry Tour.

== Personal life ==
Bennett is the son of Mark and Stacey Bennett. When his father was 45, he was diagnosed with early onset Alzheimer's. He died in 2021. The last thing he wrote to his son, in June 2020, was a short note saying, "Don't wait to do something". After his father died, Bennett took the note to a tattoo artist, and had them tattoo the note, in the style of his father's handwriting, on his left forearm.

== Amateur wins ==
- 2021 Cabo Collegiate at TPC San Antonio, Old Waverly Collegiate, The Aggie Invitational, Sprint International Amateur Championship
- 2022 Louisiana Classics, U.S. Amateur
- 2023 John Burns Intercollegiate

== Results in major championships ==
Tournament	2022	2023	2024
Masters Tournament		T16LA	
PGA Championship			
U.S. Open	T49	T43	72
The Open Championship			

Did not play

"T" indicates a tie for a place
LA = low amateur

== U.S. national team appearances ==
- Arnold Palmer Cup: 2021, 2022
