= Huntsville Championship =

Golf tournament

HomeTown Lenders Championship

Tournament information
- Location: Huntsville, Alabama
- Established: 2021
- Course: The Ledges
- Par: 70
- Length: 7,296 yards (6,671 m)
- Tour: Korn Ferry Tour
- Format: Stroke play
- Prize fund: US$1,000,000
- Month played: April
- Final year: 2023

Tournament record score
- Aggregate: 264 Harrison Endycott (2022)
- To par: −16 as above

Final champion
- (United States) Ben Kohles

Location map
- Location in the United States Location in Alabama

The Huntsville Championship was a golf tournament on the Korn Ferry Tour. It was first played from April 29 to May 2, 2021, at The Ledges in Huntsville, Alabama; it had been scheduled to be played in 2020, but was canceled due to the COVID-19 pandemic.

== Winners ==
Year	Winner	Score	To par	Margin of victory	Runner(s)-up
HomeTown Lenders Championship
2023	(United States) Ben Kohles	197 (Note: Shortened to 54 holes due to rain.)	−13	Playoff	(Canada) Ben Silverman
Huntsville Championship
2022	(Australia) Harrison Endycott	264	−16	5 strokes	(England) Ben Taylor
2021	(France) Paul Barjon	265	−15	Playoff	(United States) Billy Kennerly (Chile) Mito Pereira
2020	Canceled due to the COVID-19 pandemic				
