= Brett Drewitt =

Australian professional golfer

Personal information
- Nationality: Australia
- Born: 24 November 1990 (age 35) Taree, Australia
- Height: 5 ft 10 in (1.78 m)
- Weight: 168 lb (76 kg; 12.0 st)

Career
- Sport: Golf
- Turned professional: 2013
- Current tour: PGA Tour
- Former tours: Korn Ferry Tour; PGA Tour China
- Professional wins: 2

Number of wins by tour
- Korn Ferry Tour: 1
- Other: 1

Best results in major championships
- Masters Tournament: DNP
- PGA Championship: DNP
- U.S. Open: CUT: 2019
- The Open Championship: DNP

Brett Drewitt (born 24 November 1990) is an Australian professional golfer from Sydney, Australia. In 2014, Drewitt played on PGA Tour China, winning the United Investment Real Estate Wuhan Open and finishing third on the Order of Merit. This earned him status on the Web.com Tour for the 2015 season; he finished 93rd on the money list and failed to qualify for the Web.com Tour Finals, but improved his status for 2016 via the Web.com Tour Qualifying Tournament, where he finished tied for 21st. Drewitt graduated from the Web.com Tour Finals in 2016.

== Amateur wins ==
- 2010 Queensland Amateur, Pacific Northwest Amateur
- 2011 SA Classic, Four Nations Cup (individual champion)
- 2012 New South Wales Amateur

== Professional wins (2) ==
=== Korn Ferry Tour wins (1) ===
| No. | Date | Tournament | Winning score | Margin of victory | Runners-up |
|---|---|---|---|---|---|
| 1 | 6 Sep 2020 | Lincoln Land Championship | −19 (67-62-68-68=265) | 1 stroke | (England) Harry Hall, (United States) Ben Kohles, (United States) Austen Truslow |

=== PGA Tour China wins (1) ===
| No. | Date | Tournament | Winning score | Margin of victory | Runners-up |
|---|---|---|---|---|---|
| 1 | 18 May 2014 | United Investment Real Estate Wuhan Open | −8 (73-70-67-70=280) | Playoff | (China) Li Haotong, (China) Zhang Xinjun |

== Results in major championships ==
| Tournament | 2019 |
|---|---|
| Masters Tournament | |
| PGA Championship | |
| U.S. Open | CUT |
| The Open Championship | |

Did not play

CUT = missed the halfway cut

== Team appearances ==
Amateur

- Australian Men's Interstate Teams Matches (representing New South Wales): 2010, 2011, 2012 (winners), 2013

== See also ==
- 2016 Web.com Tour Finals graduates
- 2021 Korn Ferry Tour Finals graduates
