= Jamaica Classic =

BMW Jamaica Classic
Tournament information
- Location: Montego Bay, Jamaica
- Established: 2017
- Course: Cinnamon Hill Golf Course
- Par: 72
- Length: 6,828 yards (6,244 m)
- Tour: PGA Tour Latinoamérica
- Format: Stroke play
- Prize fund: US$175,000
- Month played: May
- Final year: 2019

Tournament record score
- Aggregate: 267 Jared Wolfe (2017); 267 Evan Harmeling (2019)
- To par: −21 as above

Current champion
- (United States) Evan Harmeling

Location map
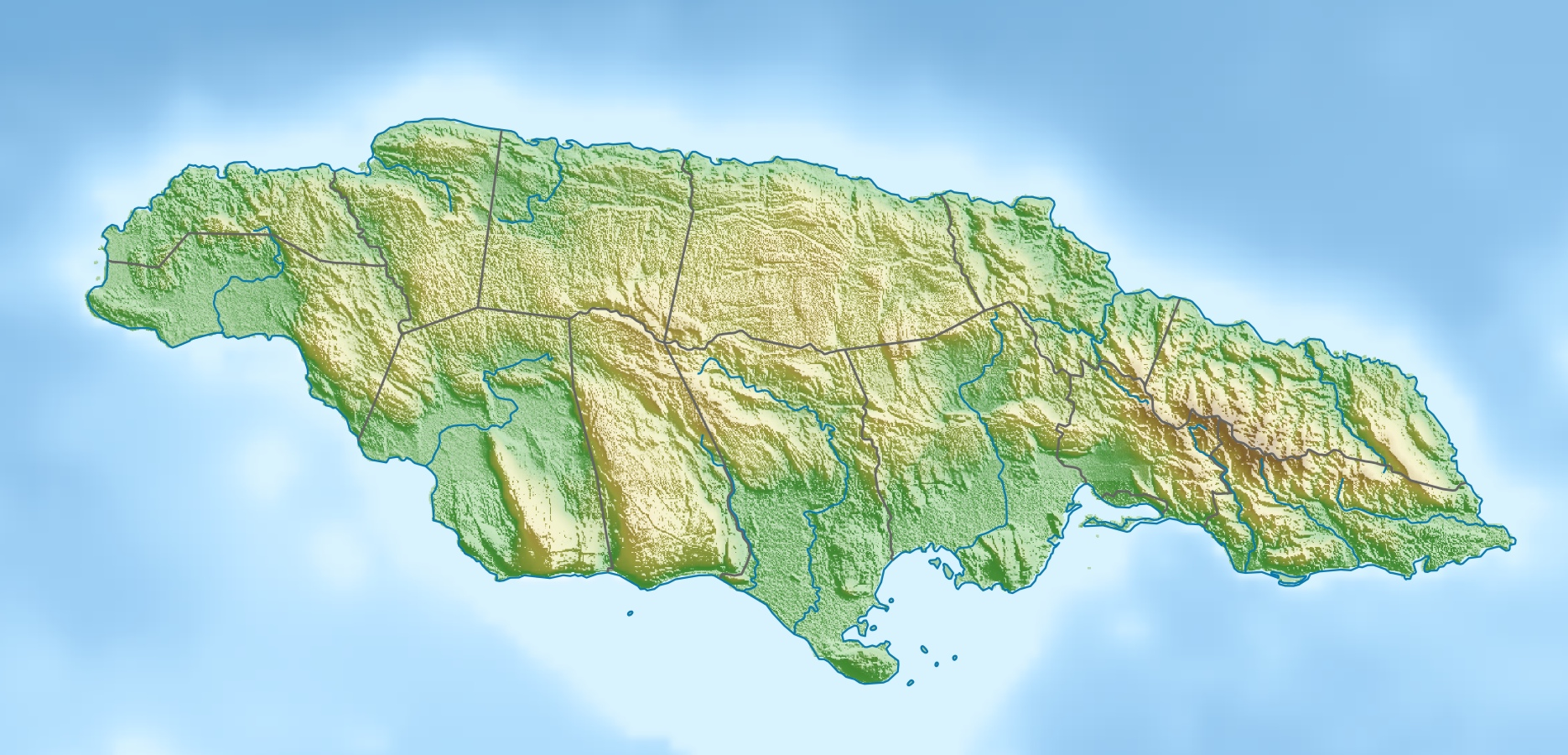
- Location in Jamaica

The BMW Jamaica Classic was a golf tournament on the PGA Tour Latinoamérica that was first played in 2017. The tournament is sponsored by event managers and broadcasters SportsMax, and was the first PGA Tour Latinoamérica event held in Jamaica.

== History ==
The inaugural event was held June 15–18, 2017 and took place at the Cinnamon Hill Golf Course in Montego Bay, Jamaica. The event was won by American Jared Wolfe by one stroke over Gerardo Ruiz and José de Jesús Rodríguez.

== Winners ==
Year	Winner	To par	Score	Margin of victory	Runner(s)-up	Ref.
2019	(United States) Evan Harmeling	267	−21	1 stroke	(Argentina) Augusto Núñez	
2018	(United States) Michael Buttacavoli	195 (Note: Shortened to 54 holes due to weather.)	−21	3 strokes	(United States) Tyson Alexander (United States) Harry Higgs	
2017	(United States) Jared Wolfe	267	−21	1 stroke	(Mexico) José de Jesús Rodríguez (Mexico) Gerardo Ruiz	
