= Will Zalatoris =

American professional golfer (born 1996)

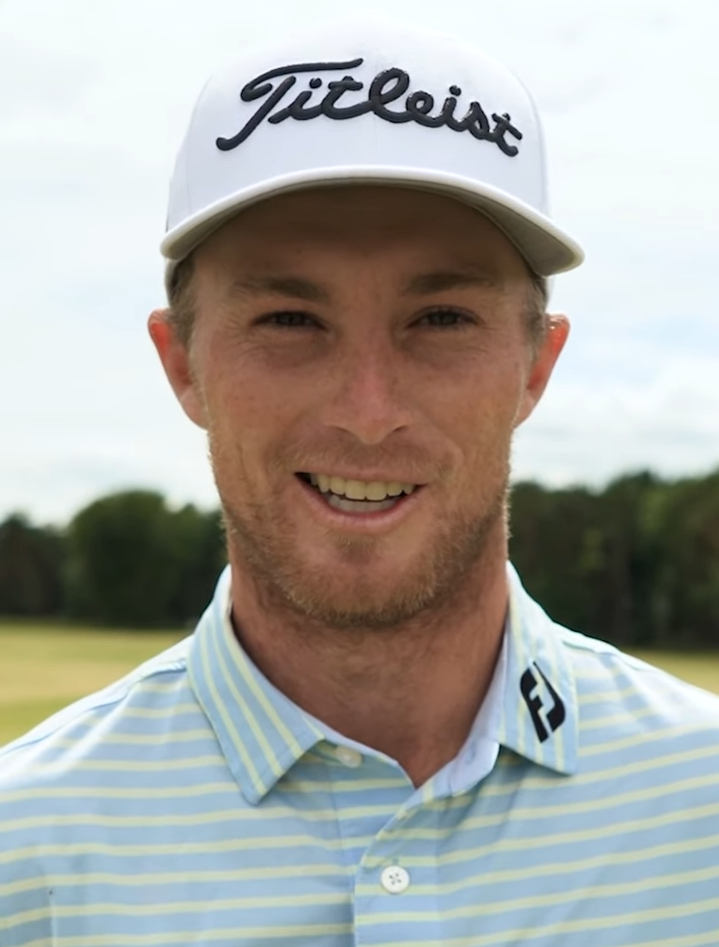
- Zalatoris in 2022

Personal information
- Full name: William Patrick Zalatoris
- Nickname: Willy Z
- Nationality: United States
- Born: August 16, 1996 (age 30) San Francisco, California, U.S.
- Height: 6 ft 2 in (1.88 m)
- Weight: 175 lb (79 kg; 12.5 st)
- Spouse: Caitlin Sellers (m. 2022)

Career
- Sport: Golf
- College: Wake Forest University
- Turned professional: 2018
- Current tour: PGA Tour
- Former tours: European Tour; Korn Ferry Tour
- Professional wins: 2
- Highest ranking: 7 (September 25, 2022) (as of November 1, 2026)

Number of wins by tour
- PGA Tour: 1
- Korn Ferry Tour: 1

Best results in major championships
- Masters Tournament: 2nd: 2021
- PGA Championship: 2nd: 2022
- U.S. Open: T2: 2022
- The Open Championship: T28: 2022

Achievements and awards
- PGA Tour Rookie of the Year: 2020–21

William Patrick Zalatoris (born August 16, 1996) is an American professional golfer who has played on the PGA Tour, where he has won once.

After playing collegiately for Wake Forest University, Zalatoris turned professional in 2018 and won on the Korn Ferry Tour in 2020. He placed second at the 2021 Masters Tournament and was named PGA Tour Rookie of the Year later that year. Zalatoris was runner-up at the PGA Championship and U.S. Open in 2022, and won his first PGA Tour title at the 2022 FedEx St. Jude Championship. He struggled due to injury in the following years and underwent multiple back surgeries.

== Early life and amateur career ==
Zalatoris was born in San Francisco, California on August 16, 1996, to Catherine and Richard Zalatoris. He was an only child. His parents worked in real estate. His mother was a track and field athlete at the University of Oregon, specializing in middle-distance running.

Both of his parents were recreational golfers, and his mother continued to play golf while carrying him until three weeks before he was born. He received his first plastic club when he was 18 months old. He learned to play the game at Mariners Point Golf Center in Foster City, California. His parents belonged to California Golf Club, where Zalatoris played alongside his father. Also at Cal Club, he met 1964 U.S. Open champion Ken Venturi when he was six. Venturi gave him advice on his grip, although Zalatoris was unaware who Venturi was at the time.

At age nine, Zalatoris moved with his family to Texas. He grew up at Bent Tree Country Club in Dallas. He often competed against fellow Dallas-area golfers Jordan Spieth and Scottie Scheffler in junior tournaments. Zalatoris attended Trinity Christian Academy in Addison, Texas, where he was a four-year letterman. In June 2014, he won the Texas Amateur Championship. He won the Trans-Mississippi Amateur in July. Two weeks later, Zalatoris won the U.S. Junior Amateur. He defeated Davis Riley, 5 and 3, in the final.

Zalatoris had planned to attend Stanford University, but was offered the Arnold Palmer Scholarship by Jerry Haas to play for the Wake Forest Demon Deacons at Wake Forest University in North Carolina beginning in fall 2014. He majored in psychology. Zalatoris won his first individual collegiate title at the Bank of Tennessee Intercollegiate in October 2014, scoring 10-under to finish two strokes ahead of runner-up Denny McCarthy.

In September 2015, Zalatoris won his second collegiate title. He birdied the final hole to win the Rod Myers Invitational by one stroke. In July 2016, Zalatoris won the Trans-Mississippi Amateur for the second time, and the Pacific Coast Amateur. He was chosen to represent the United States at the 2016 Arnold Palmer Cup. He won medalist honors for the third time in his collegiate career at the General Hackler Championship in March 2017.

As a junior, Zalatoris was named ACC Player of the Year in 2017. He was also named All-ACC, First-Team GCAA All-American, First-Team Golfweek All-American, Ben Hogan Award semifinalist, and Jack Nicklaus Award finalist. He was selected as a member of the U.S. team in the 2017 Walker Cup, alongside future PGA Tour winners such as Collin Morikawa. Zalatoris left school after his junior year to turn professional. His collegiate scoring average was 70.44, which broke the Wake Forest record of 70.87 set by Bill Haas (2001–04).

== Professional career ==
=== 2018–2020: Early years ===
Zalatoris decided in December 2017 to forego his final semester of university and turn professional at the start of 2018. He made six starts on the PGA Tour in 2018, making only one cut. Towards the end of 2018, Zalatoris competed in qualifying school for the Web.com Tour. He failed to advance past the first stage. With no status in 2019, he relied on Monday qualifying and sponsor exemptions to play on the Web.com Tour (later renamed the Korn Ferry Tour). Zalatoris secured membership for the remainder of the season after a third-place finish at the LECOM Health Challenge in July. He finished the regular season 60th in points, earning full status for the 2020 Korn Ferry Tour season.

Zalatoris's first professional victory came in July 2020, when he won the TPC Colorado Championship by one stroke. The win was one of his 11 consecutive top-20 finishes on the Korn Ferry Tour. This moved him atop the Korn Ferry Tour points list and qualified him for the 2020 U.S. Open at Winged Foot Golf Club, which was delayed to September due to the COVID-19 pandemic. At Winged Foot, he aced the par-3 seventh hole during the first round. He made the cut and finished in a tie for sixth-place, alongside world number one Dustin Johnson; it was his first top-10 finish in a major championship. He followed it up with a T8 at the Corales Puntacana Resort and Club Championship the next week, and a T5 at the Shriners Hospitals for Children Open in October. Zalatoris secured Special Temporary Member status on the PGA Tour after finishing tied-16th at the Bermuda Championship in November.

=== 2021–2022: Major championship contention, first PGA Tour victory ===
Zalatoris recorded top-15 finishes at the Farmers Insurance Open, Genesis Invitational, and Arnold Palmer Invitational in the first few months of 2021. These performances helped move him into the top 50 of the Official World Golf Ranking and qualify him for the 2021 Masters Tournament In April. Zalatoris shot rounds of 70-68-71 to position himself in tied-second place headed into Sunday. Seeking to become the first debutant to win the Masters since Fuzzy Zoeller in 1979, he shot 2-under 70 in the final round to finish solo-second, one stroke behind winner Hideki Matsuyama.

At the 2021 PGA Championship in May, he finished tied-8th. Zalatoris was voted PGA Tour Rookie of the Year for the 2020–21 season. He became the first special temporary member to win the award since Charles Howell III in 2001. In October 2021, Zalatoris shot his career-low round (11-under 61) on the PGA Tour at the Sanderson Farms Championship.

In January 2022, Zalatoris was tied for the lead of the Farmers Insurance Open after 72 holes alongside Luke List. He lost in the sudden-death playoff after List birdied the first playoff hole. At the 2022 Masters Tournament, Zalatoris shot a final-round 67 to finish tied-sixth.

Zalatoris finished runner-up in a major championship for the second time in his career at the 2022 PGA Championship in May. He lost to Justin Thomas in a three-hole aggregate playoff at Southern Hills Country Club. At the 2022 U.S. Open the following month, Zalatoris recorded another second-place finish in a major. He tied with Scottie Scheffler at 5-under, one stroke behind winner Matt Fitzpatrick at The Country Club.

In August 2022, Zalatoris won his first PGA Tour event at the FedEx St. Jude Championship. He defeated Sepp Straka in a playoff to claim the title. The event was the first of three events in the 2022 FedEx Cup Playoffs. With his win, Zalatoris moved to first in the FedEx Cup standings. In his next start at the BMW Championship, Zalatoris withdrew due to a back injury. He also withdrew from the Tour Championship the following week, where he was seeded third, due to the injury, which was diagnosed as two herniated discs. He stated that the back problems had originated at the 2021 Open Championship, when he attempted to hack the ball out of some thick fescue. He said at times the pain from the herniated discs was unbearable.

=== 2023–2025: Back surgeries ===
Zalatoris returned from his disc herniation in January 2023 at the Sentry Tournament of Champions, where he finished tied-11th. He finished fourth at the Genesis Invitational in February. Zalatoris was approached by LIV Golf, but remained on the PGA Tour. Former world number one Fred Couples, who shared the same agent as Zalatoris, stated in March 2023 that LIV had offered a $130-million contract to Zalatoris.

Shortly before the 2023 Masters Tournament began in April, Zalatoris withdrew due to injury. He stated that he jarred his back while warming up for his opening round, and "started feeling the symptoms go down [his] legs". He considered teeing it up and playing through the pain, but decided it would be prudent to withdraw. He said a few days later that he had "underwent a successful microdiscectomy" to address his herniated discs, and announced he would miss the remainder of the 2022–23 season. He was unable to swing a golf club for five months after the surgery. Prior to his injury, Zalatoris was one of the best ballstrikers in the world, so he and his coaches were reluctant to change his swing. During his recovery, an effort was made to rework his swing and address the excessive sidebend which had caused strain on his back.

In January 2024, Zalatoris made his return on the PGA Tour at the Sony Open in Hawaii, where he missed the cut. He finished runner-up at the Genesis Invitational the following month, which was the first time he was in contention to win a tournament since the surgery. He also finished tied-9th at the 2024 Masters Tournament in April, but did not record another top-10 finish for the rest of the year. Zalatoris's swing coach Troy Denton said in 2024 that, in layman's terms, Zalatoris had "an old man's back".

Zalatoris underwent a second back surgery in May 2025 after an MRI following the 2025 PGA Championship showed that he had re-herniated two discs. He stated that he suffered from "discomfort and instability in [his] back that progressively got worse" during the year. At the time, he was ranked 84th in the Official World Golf Ranking and had missed the cut in each of his last four major championships starts. Zalatoris returned to competition in December 2025 at the Nedbank Golf Challenge, a no-cut event in South Africa. He finished 15th.

=== 2026–present ===
In January 2026, Zalatoris made his return on the PGA Tour at the American Express, where he finished in a tie for 18th place. He stated that his previous back surgery involved a disc replacement and said he was now playing pain free. Zalatoris withdrew from the Cognizant Classic in February due to an ankle injury. Following a first-round 67 at the Valero Texas Open in April, he said of the ankle injury: "It's all related to the back. It was basically the nerve that, the sciatic nerve going down — basically from the ankle down I couldn’t feel anything." In May 2026, Zalatoris was sidelined due to a torn labrum in his right hip.

Zalatoris stated that in October 2026 he would undergo a spinal fusion surgery and would miss the entire 2027 PGA Tour season. He said: "I've been through four years of hell so it's good to have something that will hopefully correct it. It's not something you want to do, but when you have three Tour physical therapists tell you it needs to be done at some time, you go ahead and do it." At the time of the announcement, Zalatoris had not played since the Valero Texas Open in April and was 610th in the Official World Golf Ranking.

== Personal life ==
At the 2018 Pebble Beach Pro-Am, Zalatoris played alongside former NFL quarterback Tony Romo. Both Zalatoris and Romo are members of Maridoe Golf Club, located outside of Dallas, and regularly play golf together. Zalatoris said in 2021 that Romo has "been a big brother to me".

Zalatoris met his wife Caitlin Sellers while at Wake Forest University. They became engaged in 2021, and married in 2022.

During the recovery from his back surgery in 2023, Zalatoris returned to complete his psychology degree at Wake Forest University. He had a couple of elective courses remaining when he left a semester early during his senior year in 2017.

== In popular culture ==
During and after the 2021 Masters Tournament, actor Adam Sandler and others on social media brought attention to Zalatoris's resemblance to the young mistreated unnamed caddy in Happy Gilmore portrayed by Jared Van Snellenberg. Zalatoris subsequently appeared in the film's 2025 sequel as a fictionalized version of himself, depicted as the same young caddy from the original film who now plays golf professionally while resenting Happy for his previous mistreatment.

== Amateur wins ==
- 2014 Texas Amateur Championship, Trans-Mississippi Amateur, U.S. Junior Amateur, Bank of Tennessee Intercollegiate
- 2015 Rod Myers Invitational
- 2016 Trans-Mississippi Amateur, Pacific Coast Amateur
- 2017 General Hackler Championship, Rod Myers Invitational

== Professional wins (2) ==
=== PGA Tour wins (1) ===
Legend
FedEx Cup playoff events (1)
Other PGA Tour (0)

No.	Date	Tournament	Winning score	Margin of victory	Runner-up
1	Aug 14, 2022	FedEx St. Jude Championship	−15 (71-63-65-66=265)	Playoff	(Austria) Sepp Straka

PGA Tour playoff record (1–2)

No.	Year	Tournament	Opponent	Result
1	2022	Farmers Insurance Open	(United States) Luke List	Lost to birdie on first extra hole
2	2022	PGA Championship	(United States) Justin Thomas	Lost three-hole aggregate playoff; Thomas: −2 (4-3-4=11), Zalatoris: x (4-4-x=x)
3	2022	FedEx St. Jude Championship	(Austria) Sepp Straka	Won with bogey on third extra hole

=== Korn Ferry Tour wins (1) ===
No.	Date	Tournament	Winning score	Margin of victory	Runner-up
1	Jul 4, 2020	TPC Colorado Championship	−15 (67-67-70-69=273)	1 stroke	(United States) Chase Johnson

== Playoff record ==
European Tour playoff record (0–1)

No.	Year	Tournament	Opponent	Result
1	2022	PGA Championship	(United States) Justin Thomas	Lost three-hole aggregate playoff; Thomas: −2 (4-3-4=11), Zalatoris: x (4-4-x=x)

== Results in major championships ==
Results not in chronological order before 2019 and in 2020.

Tournament	2018	2019	2020	2021	2022	2023	2024	2025
Masters Tournament				2	T6		T9	CUT
PGA Championship				T8	2		T43	CUT
U.S. Open	CUT		T6	CUT	T2		CUT	
The Open Championship			NT	WD	T28		CUT	

Top 10
Did not play

CUT = missed the half-way cut
"T" = tied
WD = withdrew
NT = no tournament due to COVID-19 pandemic

=== Summary ===
Tournament	Wins	2nd	3rd	Top-5	Top-10	Top-25	Events	Cuts made
Masters Tournament	0	1	0	1	3	3	4	3
PGA Championship	0	1	0	1	2	2	4	3
U.S. Open	0	1	0	1	2	2	5	2
The Open Championship	0	0	0	0	0	0	3	1
Totals	0	3	0	3	7	7	16	9

- Most consecutive cuts made – 6 (2022 Masters – 2024 PGA)
- Longest streak of top-10s – 3 (twice)

== Results in The Players Championship ==
Tournament	2021	2022	2023	2024	2025
The Players Championship	T17	T26	73	CUT	T30

CUT = missed the halfway cut
"T" indicates a tie for a place

== Results in World Golf Championships ==
Tournament	2021	2022	2023
Championship	T22		
Match Play	T28	QF	T59
Invitational	T8		
Champions	NT^{1}	NT^{1}	

^{1}Canceled due to COVID-19 pandemic

Top 10

QF, R16, R32, R64 = Round in which player lost in match play
"T" = Tied
NT = No tournament
Note that the Championship and Invitational were discontinued from 2022. The Champions was discontinued from 2023.

== U.S. national team appearances ==
Amateur

- The Spirit International Amateur Golf Championship: 2015 (winners)
- Arnold Palmer Cup: 2016
- Walker Cup: 2017 (winners)

== See also ==
- 2021 Korn Ferry Tour Finals graduates
