= Adam Svensson =

Canadian professional golfer (born 1993)

Personal information
- Full name: Adam Redmond Svensson
- Nationality: Canada
- Born: December 31, 1993 (age 32) Surrey, British Columbia, Canada
- Height: 6 ft 0 in (1.83 m)
- Weight: 178 lb (81 kg; 12.7 st)

Career
- Sport: Golf
- College: Barry University
- Turned professional: 2015
- Current tour: PGA Tour
- Former tours: Korn Ferry Tour; Canadian Tour
- Professional wins: 7
- Highest ranking: 52 (March 12, 2023) (as of October 25, 2026)

Number of wins by tour
- PGA Tour: 1
- Korn Ferry Tour: 3
- Other: 3

Best results in major championships
- Masters Tournament: CUT: 2023
- PGA Championship: T40: 2023
- U.S. Open: T56: 2024
- The Open Championship: DNP

Adam Redmond Svensson (born December 31, 1993) is a Canadian professional golfer.

== Amateur career ==
Svensson was born in Surrey, British Columbia to Frank Svensson and Tina Nilsson and attended Earl Marriott Secondary School. He spent six years with the National men's amateur and development squads, winning a bronze medal representing Canada at the 2010 Toyota Junior Golf World Cup and silver at the 2014 Eisenhower Trophy in Karuizawa, Japan, together with Corey Conners and Taylor Pendrith. He shot a bogey-free course-record 7-under par 64 in final round to win the 2012 Canadian Boys Junior Championship at Osprey Ridge Golf Club in Nova Scotia.

Svensson left his mark in collegiate golf at NCAA Division II Barry University in Florida, winning nine times, earning two NCAA First-Team All-American honours, and winning the NCAA Division II Men's Golf Team Championships in 2013 and 2014. He won the Phil Mickelson Award as Most Outstanding Freshman in 2013 and was named the Jack Nicklaus Player of the Year in 2013/14. Svensson was the third-ranked amateur in Canada prior to his pro announcement.

== Professional career ==
In 2015 Svensson left college after his junior year to turn professional and play on the Canadian Tour, where he was runner-up twice, including losing a playoff to Drew Weaver at the PC Financial Open. He also played on the SwingThought Tour, winning three tournaments. He medaled at the Web.com Tour qualifying school in December 2015, giving him fully-exempt status for the 2016 season. He won his first Web.com Tour title in January 2018 at The Bahamas Great Abaco Classic and finished 14th on the regular-season money list to earn his PGA Tour card for the 2019 season. He lost his PGA Tour card after his rookie season, finishing 167th in the FedEx Cup standings. Back on the now-renamed Korn Ferry Tour, he won the Club Car Championship in March 2021. In August 2021, Svensson won the Nationwide Children's Hospital Championship as part of the Korn Ferry Tour Finals. While he had already secured a PGA Tour card for next season, the win improved Svensson's priority status for the PGA Tour in the 2021–22 season.

In November 2022, Svensson won his first PGA Tour event at the RSM Classic, shooting a six-under 64 in the final round to beat Brian Harman, Callum Tarren and Sahith Theegala by two shots.

== Amateur wins ==
- 2010 British Columbia Amateur, Canadian Juvenile Boys Championship, British Columbia Junior Boys Championship, CN Future Links Pacific Championship, Callaway World Junior Golf Championship
- 2011 British Columbia Junior Boys Championship
- 2012 Canadian Boys Junior Championship

== Professional wins (7) ==
=== PGA Tour wins (1) ===
No.	Date	Tournament	Winning score	To par	Margin of victory	Runners-up
1	Nov 20, 2022	RSM Classic	73-64-62-64=263	−19	2 strokes	(United States) Brian Harman, (England) Callum Tarren, (United States) Sahith Theegala

=== Korn Ferry Tour wins (3) ===
Legend
Finals events (1)
Other Korn Ferry Tour (2)

No.	Date	Tournament	Winning score	To par	Margin of victory	Runner(s)-up
1	Jan 21, 2018	The Bahamas Great Abaco Classic	68-67-68-68=271	−17	1 stroke	(South Korea) Im Sung-jae
2	Mar 28, 2021	Club Car Championship	68-68-69-66=271	−17	Playoff	(United States) Max McGreevy
3	Aug 29, 2021	Nationwide Children's Hospital Championship	67-68-65-67=267	−17	2 strokes	(United States) Bronson Burgoon, (Germany) Stephan Jäger

Korn Ferry Tour playoff record (1–0)

No.	Year	Tournament	Opponent	Result
1	2021	Club Car Championship	(United States) Max McGreevy	Won with birdie on second extra hole

=== SwingThought Tour wins (3) ===
- 2015 Lake County Classic, Killearn CC Classic, Milton Martin Honda Classic

== Results in major championships ==
Tournament	2023	2024
Masters Tournament	CUT	
PGA Championship	T40	T43
U.S. Open	T60	T56
The Open Championship		

Did not play

CUT = missed the half-way cut
"T" = tied

== Results in The Players Championship ==
Tournament	2023	2024	2025
The Players Championship	T13	CUT	CUT

CUT = missed the halfway cut
"T" indicates a tie for a place

== Results in World Golf Championships ==
Tournament	2023
Match Play	T52

"T" = Tied

== Team appearances ==
Amateur

- Toyota Junior Golf World Cup (representing Canada): 2010
- Eisenhower Trophy (representing Canada): 2014

== See also ==
- 2018 Web.com Tour Finals graduates
- 2021 Korn Ferry Tour Finals graduates
- 2025 PGA Tour Qualifying School graduates
