= 2021 Masters Tournament =

American golf tournament

- Front cover of the 2021 Masters Journal

Tournament information
- Dates: April 8–11, 2021
- Location: Augusta, Georgia, U.S. 33.503°N 82.020°W
- Course: Augusta National Golf Club
- Tours: PGA Tour; European Tour; Japan Golf Tour

Statistics
- Par: 72
- Length: 7,475 yards (6,835 m)
- Field: 88 players, 54 after cut
- Cut: 147 (+3)
- Prize fund: $11,500,000
- Winner's share: $2,070,000

Champion
- (Japan) Hideki Matsuyama
- 278 (−10)
- Location in the United States Location in Georgia

The 2021 Masters Tournament was the 85th edition of the Masters Tournament and the first of the men's four major golf championships held in 2021. It was held from April 8–11, 2021, at the Augusta National Golf Club in Augusta, Georgia.

After the 2020 tournament had been postponed to November because of the COVID-19 pandemic and held behind closed doors, the 2021 edition returned to its traditional April dates and admitted spectators, although in reduced numbers and with social distancing measures in place. For the second year in succession, the traditional Par-3 contest was canceled due to these restrictions.

Hideki Matsuyama became the first Japanese male golfer to win a major championship, and the first Asian-born golfer to win the Masters, finishing with a 72-hole score of 278 (−10), one shot ahead of Will Zalatoris.

== Course ==
Hole	Name	Yards	Par	Hole	Name	Yards	Par
1	Tea Olive	445	4	10	Camellia	495	4
2	Pink Dogwood	575	5	11	White Dogwood	505	4
3	Flowering Peach	350	4	12	Golden Bell	155	3
4	Flowering Crab Apple	240	3	13	Azalea	510	5
5	Magnolia	495	4	14	Chinese Fir	440	4
6	Juniper	180	3	15	Firethorn	530	5
7	Pampas	450	4	16	Redbud	170	3
8	Yellow Jasmine	570	5	17	Nandina	440	4
9	Carolina Cherry	460	4	18	Holly	465	4
Out		3,765	36	In		3,710	36
Source:				Total		7,475	72

== Field ==
Participation in the Masters Tournament is by invitation only, and the tournament has the smallest field of the major championships. There were a number of criteria by which invites were awarded, including all past winners, recent major champions, leading finishers in the previous years' majors, leading players on the PGA Tour in the previous season, winners of full-point tournaments on the PGA Tour during the previous 12 months, leading players in the Official World Golf Ranking and some leading amateurs.

=== Criteria ===
This list details the qualification criteria for the 2021 Masters Tournament and the players who qualified under them; any additional criteria under which players qualified is indicated in parentheses.

1. All past winners of the Masters Tournament

- Fred Couples
- Sergio García (16,18,19)
- Dustin Johnson (2,15,16,17,18,19)
- Zach Johnson
- Bernhard Langer
- Sandy Lyle
- Phil Mickelson
- Larry Mize
- José María Olazábal
- Patrick Reed (12,16,17,18,19)
- Charl Schwartzel
- Adam Scott (18,19)
- Vijay Singh
- Jordan Spieth (3,16)
- Bubba Watson (18)
- Mike Weir
- Danny Willett
- Ian Woosnam
- Past winners who did not play: Tommy Aaron, Jack Burke Jr., Ángel Cabrera, Charles Coody, Ben Crenshaw, Nick Faldo, Raymond Floyd, Bob Goalby, Trevor Immelman, Jack Nicklaus, Mark O'Meara, Gary Player, Craig Stadler, Tom Watson, Tiger Woods (18), Fuzzy Zoeller

2. Recent winners of the U.S. Open (2016–2020)

- Bryson DeChambeau (15,16,17,18,19)
- Brooks Koepka (4,12,16,18,19)
- Gary Woodland (18)

3. Recent winners of the Open Championship (2016–2020)

- Shane Lowry (18,19)
- Francesco Molinari
- Henrik Stenson

4. Recent winners of the PGA Championship (2016–2020)

- Collin Morikawa (16,17,18,19)
- Justin Thomas (5,12,16,17,18,19)
- Jimmy Walker

5. Recent winners of the Players Championship (2018–2021)

- Rory McIlroy (12,17,18,19)
- Webb Simpson (12,16,17,18,19)

6. The winner of the gold medal at the Olympic Games (Note: Players qualifying under this category are only eligible for the Masters Tournament following the Olympic Games.)

7. The winner and runner-up in the 2020 U.S. Amateur

- Ollie Osborne (a)
- Tyler Strafaci (a)

8. The winner of the 2020 Amateur Championship

- Joe Long (a)

9. The winner of the 2020 Asia-Pacific Amateur Championship (Note: Several championships were not held due to the COVID-19 pandemic, so there were no qualifiers under these criteria.)

10. The winner of the 2021 Latin America Amateur Championship

11. The winner of the 2020 U.S. Mid-Amateur Golf Championship

12. The leading twelve players, and those tying for twelfth place, from the 2020 Masters Tournament

- Corey Conners (19)
- Dylan Frittelli
- Im Sung-jae (17,18,19)
- Pan Cheng-tsung
- Jon Rahm (16,17,18,19)
- Cameron Smith (17,18,19)

13. The leading four players, and those tying for fourth place, in the 2020 U.S. Open

- Harris English (16,17,18,19)
- Louis Oosthuizen (18,19)
- Matthew Wolff (15,18,19)

14. The leading four players, and those tying for fourth place, in the 2020 Open Championship

15. The leading four players, and those tying for fourth place, in the 2020 PGA Championship

- Paul Casey (18,19)
- Jason Day (18,19)
- Tony Finau (17,18,19)
- Scottie Scheffler (17,18,19)

16. Winners of PGA Tour events (Note: Events must carry full-point allocation towards the FedEx Cup.) from the originally scheduled date of the 2020 Masters Tournament (April 9, 2020) to the start of the 2021 tournament

- Daniel Berger (17,18,19)
- Patrick Cantlay (18,19)
- Stewart Cink
- Brian Gay
- Jim Herman
- Max Homa (19)
- Billy Horschel (17,18,19)
- Viktor Hovland (17,18,19)
- Matt Jones
- Kim Si-woo
- Jason Kokrak (18,19)
- Martin Laird
- Kevin Na (17,18,19)
- Carlos Ortiz (19)
- Robert Streb
- Hudson Swafford
- Michael Thompson

17. All players who qualified for the 2020 Tour Championship

- Abraham Ancer (18,19)
- Cameron Champ
- Lanto Griffin
- Tyrrell Hatton (18,19)
- Mackenzie Hughes (18,19)
- Kevin Kisner (18,19)
- Marc Leishman (18,19)
- Hideki Matsuyama (18,19)
- Sebastián Muñoz
- Joaquín Niemann (18,19)
- Ryan Palmer (18,19)
- Xander Schauffele (18,19)
- Brendon Todd (18)

18. The leading 50 players on the Official World Golf Ranking as of December 31, 2020

- Christiaan Bezuidenhout (19)
- Matt Fitzpatrick (19)
- Tommy Fleetwood (19)
- Matt Kuchar (19)
- Victor Perez (19)
- Ian Poulter
- Justin Rose (19)
- Matt Wallace
- Lee Westwood (19)
- Bernd Wiesberger (19)

19. The leading 50 players on the Official World Golf Ranking as of March 29, 2021

- Brian Harman
- Robert MacIntyre
- Will Zalatoris

20. Invited international players (Note: The Masters Tournament committee may invite international players who are not otherwise qualified.)

== Round summaries ==
=== First round ===
Thursday, April 8, 2021

Justin Rose, twice a runner-up at the Masters, played his final 11 holes in 9-under, including an eagle at the par-5 8th, to begin the tournament with a round of 65 (−7). His four-shot lead after the first round was tied for second-largest in Masters history. It was Rose's fourth time holding the first-round lead at the Masters, tying Jack Nicklaus for the tournament record.

Defending champion Dustin Johnson opened with a two-over round of 74, ending his streak of 11 consecutive under-par rounds at the Masters, the longest in tournament history.

Will Zalatoris, making his Masters debut, eagled the par-5 15th and shot 70 (−2) to share fourth place. Jordan Spieth, the 2015 champion, chipped in for eagle on that hole and finished at one-under, in a tie for eighth place.

Tommy Fleetwood made a hole-in-one at the par-3 16th, the 32nd hole-in-one in the history of the Masters.

Place	Player	Score	To par
1	(England) Justin Rose	65	−7
T2	(United States) Brian Harman	69	−3
T2	(Japan) Hideki Matsuyama	69	−3
T4	(South Africa) Christiaan Bezuidenhout	70	−2
T4	(United States) Patrick Reed	70	−2
T4	(United States) Webb Simpson	70	−2
T4	(United States) Will Zalatoris	70	−2
T8	(England) Tyrrell Hatton	71	−1
T8	(South Korea) Kim Si-woo	71	−1
T8	(United States) Jason Kokrak	71	−1
T8	(Republic of Ireland) Shane Lowry	71	−1
T8	(United States) Jordan Spieth	71	−1

=== Second round ===
Friday, April 9, 2021

Justin Rose was three-over on his front-nine to see his four-shot lead at the beginning of the round disappear. He rebounded, though, with three birdies on the back-nine to shoot an even-par 72 and maintain a one-shot lead after 36 holes.

Masters rookie Will Zalatoris birdied his final three holes in a round of 68 (−4) to get into a tie for second place with Brian Harman, a shot behind Rose. Jordan Spieth made a 30-foot birdie putt on the 17th and was part of a tie for fourth place at 5-under. Justin Thomas birdied all three holes around Amen Corner and didn't make a bogey until the 18th hole to shoot 67 (−5) and jump into a tie for sixth.

54 players, scoring 147 (+3) or better, made the cut. Defending champion Dustin Johnson shot a three-over 75 and missed the cut by two strokes. Others to miss the cut included Rory McIlroy, who failed to make the weekend at the Masters for the first time since 2010, as well as 2020 runner-up Im Sung-jae. None of the three amateurs in the field made the cut for the first time since 2015.

Place	Player	Score	To par
1	(England) Justin Rose	65-72=137	−7
T2	(United States) Brian Harman	69-69=138	−6
T2	(United States) Will Zalatoris	70-68=138	−6
T4	(Australia) Marc Leishman	72-67=139	−5
T4	(United States) Jordan Spieth	71-68=139	−5
T6	(United States) Cameron Champ	72-68=140	−4
T6	(United States) Tony Finau	74-66=140	−4
T6	(South Korea) Kim Si-woo	71-69=140	−4
T6	(Japan) Hideki Matsuyama	69-71=140	−4
T6	(United States) Justin Thomas	73-67=140	−4
T6	(Austria) Bernd Wiesberger	74-66=140	−4

=== Third round ===
Saturday, April 10, 2021

Hideki Matsuyama was one-under on his round and two shots off the lead playing the 11th hole when play was halted for 77 minutes by inclement weather. When play resumed, Matsuyama birdied the hole from the trees on the right. He also birdied the par-three 12th before hitting his second shot on the par-five 15th to six feet and making the putt for an eagle. Matsuyama hit his approach at the par-3 16th to four feet for another birdie. After getting up-and-down from over the green on the 18th, Matsuyama carded a seven-under 65 and the only bogey-free round of the week, opening up a four-shot lead entering the final round. He was the first Japanese player to hold the overnight lead after any round at the Masters.

Justin Rose, leader after the first two rounds, birdied his first two holes to take a three-shot lead. But he made only one more birdie the rest of the round to go with three bogeys and shot an even-par 72 to join a group of four tied for second place. Xander Schauffele birdied the par-5 13th and holed a 61-foot eagle putt on the 15th to shoot 68 (−4). They were joined in second place by Marc Leishman and Masters rookie Will Zalatoris.

Corey Conners made a hole-in-one on the par-3 sixth hole, the sixth on that hole in Masters history, but three-putted from 30 feet on the 13th after having a chance at an eagle and bogeyed the 14th. He came back with birdies on the 15th and 17th to shoot 68 and sit alone in sixth place, five shots behind. Jordan Spieth made four birdies but also double-bogeyed the seventh in an even-par round; he was six shots back in seventh place. Justin Thomas got within one of the lead after birdies on holes 2 and 3, but fell from contention after hitting his third shot on 13 into the tributary of Rae's Creek and making a triple-bogey 8.

Place	Player	Score	To par
1	(Japan) Hideki Matsuyama	69-71-65=205	−11
T2	(Australia) Marc Leishman	72-67-70=209	−7
T2	(England) Justin Rose	65-72-72=209	−7
T2	(United States) Xander Schauffele	72-69-68=209	−7
T2	(United States) Will Zalatoris	70-68-71=209	−7
6	(Canada) Corey Conners	73-69-68=210	−6
7	(United States) Jordan Spieth	71-68-72=211	−5
8	(United States) Brian Harman	69-69-74=212	−4
9	(United States) Tony Finau	74-66-73=213	−3
T10	(South Korea) Kim Si-woo	71-69-74=214	−2
T10	(Scotland) Robert MacIntyre	74-70-70=214	−2
T10	(Austria) Bernd Wiesberger	74-66-74=214	−2

=== Final round ===
Sunday, April 11, 2021

==== Summary ====
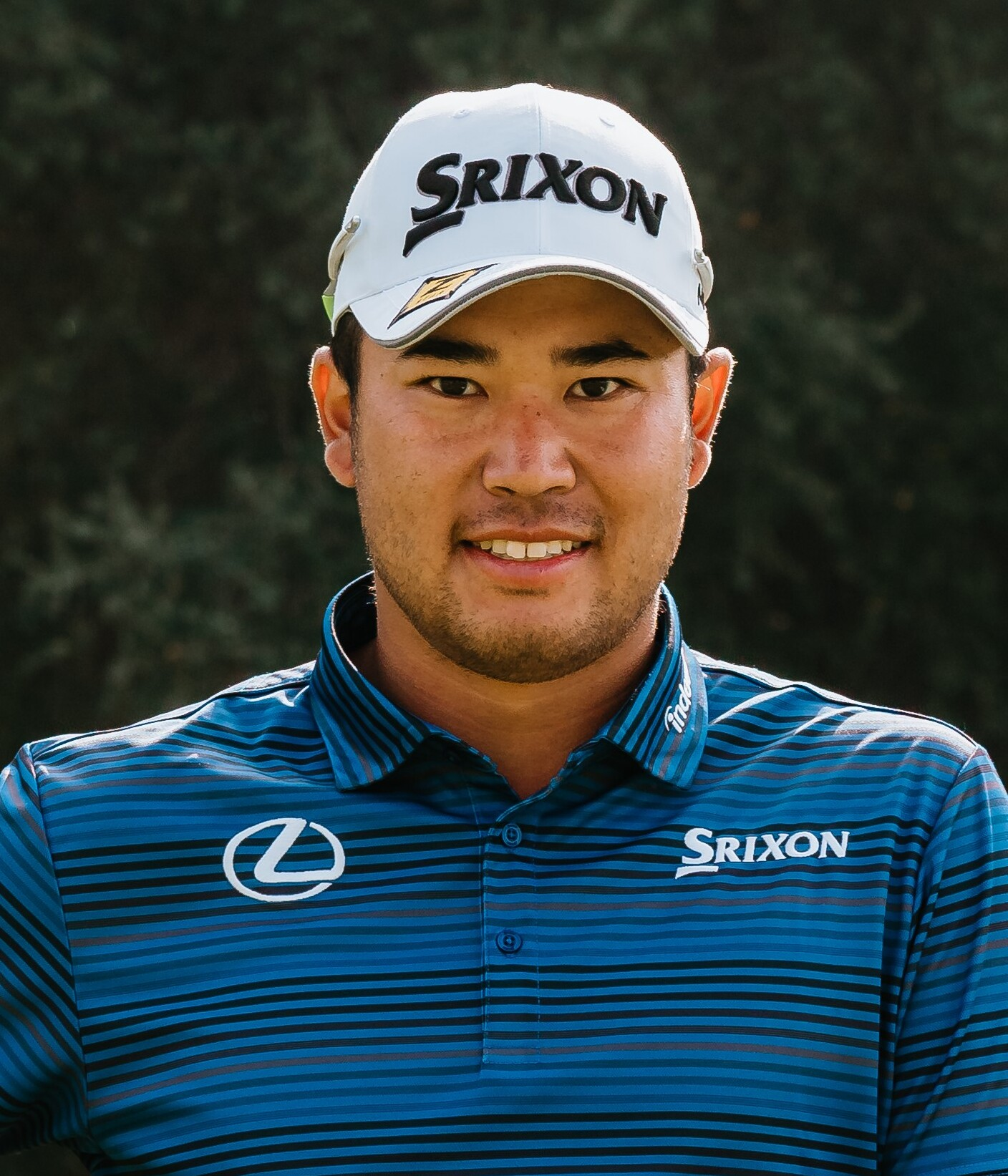
Hideki Matsuyama won his first Masters title

External videos
- Full final round coverage on CBS on YouTube

Hideki Matsuyama, who led by four shots entering the round, saw his lead cut to just one after he bogeyed the first hole while Will Zalatoris made birdie at the first and second. Matsuyama came back with three birdies on the front-nine and led by as many as six shots on the back-nine.

Xander Schauffele, tied with Zalatoris for second at the start of the day, birdied the seventh and eighth holes, then made four straight birdies from holes 12 to 15 to get within two of Matsuyama. At the par-3 16th, Schauffele hit his tee shot into the water and made triple-bogey, dropping him out of contention. He shot an even-par 72 and finished at 7-under for the tournament, three shots back in a tie for third.

Matsuyama, meanwhile, bogeyed the par-3 12th after failing to get up-and-down from a greenside bunker. After making a birdie on the par-5 13th when his tee shot ricocheted off a tree back into play, he hit his approach shot on the par-5 15th into the water over the green for another bogey. Zalatoris birdied the hole and left his second shot on the 17th six feet from the flag for another birdie to finish at 9-under following a round of 70. With a two-shot lead and two holes to play, Matsuyama two-putted for par on 17. At the 18th, he hit his second shot into the greenside bunker and missed a five-foot par putt but tapped in for bogey and a one-shot victory at 10-under. With the win, Matsuyama became the first Japanese player to win the Masters and the first Japanese male to win a major championship.

==== Final leaderboard ====
Champion
(a) = amateur
(c) = past champion

Top 10
Place	Player	Score	To par	Money (US$)
1	(Japan) Hideki Matsuyama	69-71-65-73=278	−10	2,070,000
2	(United States) Will Zalatoris	70-68-71-70=279	−9	1,242,000
T3	(United States) Xander Schauffele	72-69-68-72=281	−7	667,000
T3	(United States) Jordan Spieth (c)	71-68-72-70=281	−7	667,000
T5	(Australia) Marc Leishman	72-67-70-73=282	−6	437,000
T5	(Spain) Jon Rahm	72-72-72-66=282	−6	437,000
7	(England) Justin Rose	65-72-72-74=283	−5	385,250
T8	(Canada) Corey Conners	73-69-68-74=284	−4	345,000
T8	(United States) Patrick Reed (c)	70-75-70-69=284	−4	345,000
T10	(United States) Tony Finau	74-66-73-72=285	−3	299,000
T10	(Australia) Cameron Smith	74-68-73-70=285	−3	299,000

Leaderboard below the top 10
Place	Player	Score	To par	Money ($)
T12	(United States) Stewart Cink	74-69-72-71=286	−2	218,500
T12	(United States) Brian Harman	69-69-74-74=286	−2	218,500
T12	(South Korea) Kim Si-woo	71-69-74-72=286	−2	218,500
T12	(Scotland) Robert MacIntyre	74-70-70-72=286	−2	218,500
T12	(United States) Kevin Na	75-70-70-71=286	−2	218,500
T12	(United States) Webb Simpson	70-76-70-70=286	−2	218,500
T18	(England) Tyrrell Hatton	71-74-74-68=287	−1	161,000
T18	(United States) Collin Morikawa	73-69-75-70=287	−1	161,000
T18	(United States) Scottie Scheffler	73-72-71-71=287	−1	161,000
T21	(United States) Harris English	74-71-73-70=288	E	119,600
T21	(Norway) Viktor Hovland	73-70-72-73=288	E	119,600
T21	(Republic of Ireland) Shane Lowry	71-73-72-72=288	E	119,600
T21	(United States) Phil Mickelson (c)	75-72-69-72=288	E	119,600
T21	(United States) Justin Thomas	73-67-75-73=288	E	119,600
T26	(Mexico) Abraham Ancer	75-69-75-70=289	+1	79,925
T26	(England) Paul Casey	73-74-73-69=289	+1	79,925
T26	(United States) Cameron Champ	72-68-77-72=289	+1	79,925
T26	(Australia) Matt Jones	74-69-74-72=289	+1	79,925
T26	(South Africa) Louis Oosthuizen	76-70-72-71=289	+1	79,925
T26	(England) Ian Poulter	74-73-72-70=289	+1	79,925
T26	(South Africa) Charl Schwartzel (c)	74-71-72-72=289	+1	79,925
T26	(United States) Bubba Watson (c)	74-70-73-72=289	+1	79,925
T34	(England) Matt Fitzpatrick	74-70-73-73=290	+2	60,663
T34	(United States) Ryan Palmer	74-68-73-75=290	+2	60,663
T34	(United States) Michael Thompson	72-72-75-71=290	+2	60,663
T34	(England) Matt Wallace	74-72-71-73=290	+2	60,663
T38	(Scotland) Martin Laird	74-71-72-74=291	+3	52,900
T38	(Sweden) Henrik Stenson	73-71-71-76=291	+3	52,900
T40	(South Africa) Christiaan Bezuidenhout	70-76-74-72=292	+4	43,700
T40	(Canada) Mackenzie Hughes	72-72-72-76=292	+4	43,700
T40	(Colombia) Sebastián Muñoz	74-73-71-74=292	+4	43,700
T40	(Chile) Joaquín Niemann	75-71-70-76=292	+4	43,700
T40	(Austria) Bernd Wiesberger	74-66-74-78=292	+4	43,700
T40	(United States) Gary Woodland	73-72-75-72=292	+4	43,700
T46	(United States) Bryson DeChambeau	76-67-75-75=293	+5	33,503
T46	(England) Tommy Fleetwood	74-70-73-76=293	+5	33,503
T46	(United States) Brendon Todd	73-71-76-73=293	+5	33,503
49	(United States) Jason Kokrak	71-76-71-77=295	+7	29,900
T50	(United States) Billy Horschel	76-71-73-76=296	+8	28,635
T50	(Spain) José María Olazábal (c)	75-71-75-75=296	+8	28,635
52	(Italy) Francesco Molinari	74-73-69-81=297	+9	27,600
53	(United States) Jim Herman	76-70-76-76=298	+10	27,140
54	(Australia) Adam Scott (c)	74-73-79-73=299	+11	26,680
CUT	(United States) Daniel Berger	75-73=148	+4	
CUT	(Spain) Sergio García (c)	76-72=148	+4	
CUT	(United States) Max Homa	74-74=148	+4	
CUT	(United States) Matt Kuchar	78-70=148	+4	
CUT	(United States) Jimmy Walker	75-73=148	+4	
CUT	(United States) Lanto Griffin	76-73=149	+5	
CUT	(United States) Dustin Johnson (c)	74-75=149	+5	
CUT	(United States) Kevin Kisner	72-77=149	+5	
CUT	(United States) Brooks Koepka	74-75=149	+5	
CUT	(Canada) Mike Weir (c)	78-71=149	+5	
CUT	(England) Lee Westwood	78-71=149	+5	
CUT	(England) Danny Willett (c)	76-73=149	+5	
CUT	(South Africa) Dylan Frittelli	76-74=150	+6	
CUT	(Northern Ireland) Rory McIlroy	76-74=150	+6	
CUT	(Taiwan) Pan Cheng-tsung	79-71=150	+6	
CUT	(United States) Robert Streb	75-75=150	+6	
CUT	(United States) Zach Johnson (c)	77-74=151	+7	
CUT	(Germany) Bernhard Langer (c)	74-77=151	+7	
CUT	(France) Victor Perez	78-73=151	+7	
CUT	(United States) Patrick Cantlay	79-73=152	+8	
CUT	(United States) Brian Gay	78-74=152	+8	
CUT	(United States) Ollie Osborne (a)	76-76=152	+8	
CUT	(Australia) Jason Day	77-76=153	+9	
CUT	(Mexico) Carlos Ortiz	82-71=153	+9	
CUT	(Wales) Ian Woosnam (c)	76-77=153	+9	
CUT	(England) Joe Long (a)	82-72=154	+10	
CUT	(Scotland) Sandy Lyle (c)	81-75=156	+12	
CUT	(United States) Hudson Swafford	73-83=156	+12	
CUT	(United States) Fred Couples (c)	79-78=157	+13	
CUT	(South Korea) Im Sung-jae	77-80=157	+13	
CUT	(Fiji) Vijay Singh (c)	79-80=159	+15	
CUT	(United States) Tyler Strafaci (a)	80-81=161	+17	
CUT	(United States) Larry Mize (c)	84-79=163	+19	
DQ	(United States) Matthew Wolff	76-79=155	+11	

==== Scorecard ====
Hole	1	2	3	4	5	6	7	8	9	10	11	12	13	14	15	16	17	18
Par	4	5	4	3	4	3	4	5	4	4	4	3	5	4	5	3	4	4
(Japan) Matsuyama	−10	−11	−11	−11	−11	−11	−11	−12	−13	−13	−13	−12	−13	−13	−12	−11	−11	−10
(United States) Zalatoris	−8	−9	−8	−8	−8	−8	−8	−9	−9	−8	−8	−7	−7	−7	−8	−8	−9	−9
(United States) Schauffele	−7	−8	−7	−6	−4	−4	−5	−6	−6	−6	−6	−7	−8	−9	−10	−7	−7	−7
(United States) Spieth	−4	−5	−5	−5	−4	−3	−3	−3	−4	−5	−5	−5	−6	−7	−7	−7	−8	−7
(Australia) Leishman	−6	−7	−6	−6	−6	−6	−5	−5	−5	−5	−4	−4	−5	−5	−5	−6	−6	−6
(Spain) Rahm	−1	−3	−3	−3	−3	−3	−3	−4	−4	−4	−4	−5	−5	−5	−6	−6	−6	−6
(England) Rose	−6	−7	−6	−6	−5	−5	−6	−6	−5	−5	−5	−5	−6	−6	−5	−4	−4	−5
(Canada) Conners	−6	−7	−7	−7	−6	−5	−3	−2	−2	−2	−2	−2	−2	−3	−3	−3	−3	−4
(United States) Reed	−1	−3	−3	−3	−2	−2	−2	−2	−2	−2	−1	−1	−2	−3	−4	−5	−5	−4
(United States) Finau	−3	−3	−3	−2	−2	−2	−2	−2	−2	−2	−1	E	−1	−2	−2	−3	−2	−3
(Australia) Smith	−1	−2	−2	−2	−2	−2	−2	−3	−3	−3	−3	−3	−4	−4	−3	−3	−3	−3

Cumulative tournament scores, relative to par

Eagle	Birdie	Bogey	Double bogey	Triple bogey+
