= Mito Pereira =

Chilean professional golfer (born 1995)

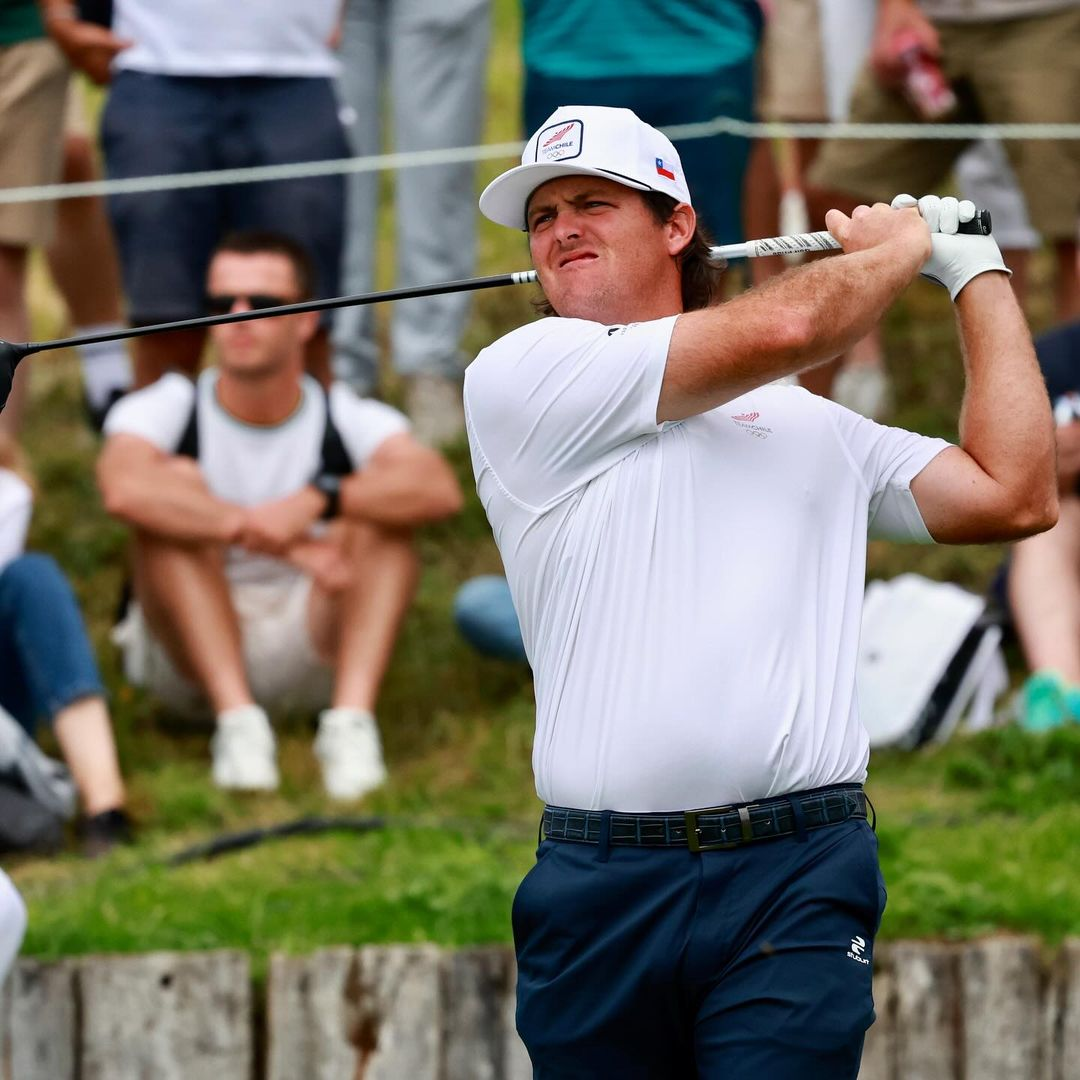
- Pereira at the 2024 Summer Olympics

Personal information
- Full name: Guillermo Pereira Hinke
- Nickname: Mito
- Nationality: Chile
- Born: 31 March 1995 (age 31) Santiago, Chile
- Height: 6 ft 0 in (183 cm)
- Weight: 196 lb (89 kg)
- Spouse: Antonia Prida (m. 2021)
- Children: 1

Career
- Sport: Golf
- College: Texas Tech University
- Turned professional: 2015
- Former tours: LIV Golf; PGA Tour; Korn Ferry Tour; PGA Tour Latinoamérica
- Professional wins: 13
- Highest ranking: 41 (9 October 2022) (as of 25 October 2026)

Number of wins by tour
- Korn Ferry Tour: 3
- Other: 10

Best results in major championships
- Masters Tournament: T43: 2023
- PGA Championship: T3: 2022
- U.S. Open: CUT: 2019, 2022, 2023
- The Open Championship: CUT: 2022
Medal record
Pan American Games
Bronze medal – third place	2019 Lima	Individual

Guillermo "Mito" Pereira Hinke (born 31 March 1995) is a Chilean former professional golfer who played on the PGA Tour and the LIV Golf League. He was best known for contending at the 2022 PGA Championship, where he made a double bogey on the final hole to finish one shot outside of a playoff.

A talented amateur golfer, Pereira was recruited to play for Texas Tech University. He spent one year with the Texas Tech Red Raiders before turning professional in 2015. He subsequently played on PGA Tour Latinoamérica and the Korn Ferry Tour, earning status on the PGA Tour in 2021 via a three-win promotion. Pereira left the PGA Tour to join LIV Golf in 2023. He retired from professional golf in 2025 at the age of 30.

== Early life and amateur career ==
Pereira was born on 31 March 1995 in Santiago, Chile, to Sibylle Hinke and Guillermo Pereira. He has two siblings. Pereira has German ancestry through his mother. In Spanish, Mito means "myth". Pereira's nickname is unrelated to this definition and instead is a derivation of "Guillermito", an affectionate name which his mother gave to him.

Pereira's father was a recreational golfer and introduced his son to the game. Pereira stated that he started with plastic clubs aged "two or three years old" and played in his first tournament at age six. He grew up near Joaquín Niemann and they began playing golf together as children. Niemann viewed Pereira, who was a few years older, as an inspiration. They both were coached by Eduardo Miquel, who had previously coached other golfers such as Benjamín Alvarado and Paz Echeverría.

On the advice of the family of Chilean tennis player Hans Gildemeister, Pereira began visiting the United States at age eight to compete in tournaments. He performed well and became known as a top prospect. He finished runner-up in the boys' 10–11 division at the 2006 Optimist International Junior Golf Championship, and won the boys' 12–13 division in 2008. He also was runner-up at the Junior Open Championship in 2010.

Aged 14, Pereira received an assessment at the David Leadbetter Golf Academy (part of the IMG Academy). He was evaluated to have the potential as a top 30 player in the world and was offered a scholarship. Pereira subsequently moved to Florida to enroll at IMG Academy. Six months later, he left the academy and took a hiatus from golf, which lasted two years. He recalled in 2022: "I got tired of it. I quit and just played other sports for a while – dirt bike, soccer and tennis. One day, I wanted to play golf again and I came back. It’s that simple." Due to his lengthy layoff, Pereira suffered due to back injuries once he began playing golf again.

In 2012, Pereira's father developed a serious illness, which caused Pereira to consider retiring from golf. The family was no longer able to afford membership at the golf club where Pereira practiced, but the club intervened and offered him free membership. In September 2013, Pereira won the Abierto Las Brisas de Chicureo, a professional tournament on the Chilean Tour. He shot 6-under 210 to win by one stroke. Following this victory, he began to receive scholarship offers from American universities. Pereira moved to 5th in the World Amateur Golf Ranking in August 2014.

Pereira was recruited to play for Texas Tech University beginning in fall 2014. Greg Sands, head coach of the Texas Tech Red Raiders golf team, offered him a scholarship despite only seeing him play a few times. Fellow Chilean Matías Domínguez helped to convince Pereira to pick Texas Tech. Pereira shot a 9-under 63 at the Tavistock Collegiate Invitational in October 2014. He finished runner-up at the Royal Oaks Intercollegiate the following week. Pereira tied for eighth at the Big 12 Championships in April 2015 at Southern Hills Country Club, nine strokes behind the winner Scottie Scheffler. Pereira ended his freshman year at Texas Tech ranked 68th in the Golfweek/Sagarin College Rankings and 118th in the World Amateur Golf Ranking. He announced in July 2015 that he had decided to leave university and turn professional.

== Professional career ==
After leaving Texas Tech University, Pereira returned to Chile and began training again with Eduardo Miquel. Pereira received an invite to the Chile Open in October 2015. He finished tied-fourth and was the low Chilean. The tournament was part of the 2015 PGA Tour Latinoamérica schedule and the result secured him an exemption to the next event on the schedule, the Mundo Maya Open, where he finished tied-ninth.

During the 2016 PGA Tour Latinoamérica season, Pereira won the Roberto De Vicenzo Punta del Este Open Copa NEC. In addition to his victory, he had two runner-up finishes and four further top-10s in 18 starts. He ended the season ranked No. 3 on the Order of Merit, earning promotion to the 2017 Web.com Tour, where his best finish was a tie for third at the Nashville Golf Open.

At the 2019 U.S. Open, he qualified for his first major, but did not make the cut. At the 2019 Pan American Games, Pereira won the bronze medal in the men's individual competition.

On the 2020–21 Korn Ferry Tour, he won the Country Club de Bogotá Championship in February 2020. With back to back victories at the Rex Hospital Open and BMW Charity Pro-Am in June 2021, he earned an instant promotion to the PGA Tour. He became just the 12th player in the developmental tour's 32-year history to earn the automatic three-win promotion, and the first since Wesley Bryan in 2016. In August 2021, Pereira finished in a tie for 3rd place at the Olympic Games. He lost in a 7-man playoff for the bronze medal.

At the 2022 PGA Championship, he entered the final round with a three-shot lead over Will Zalatoris and Matt Fitzpatrick, at 9-under-par. However, he struggled throughout the day, and reached the par-4 18th hole at Southern Hills at 6-under, with a one stroke lead over Zalatoris and Justin Thomas. Having missed his birdie putt at 17 by mere inches, he was aggressive off the tee, ultimately finding the right hand side creek, leading to a double bogey. He ended up tied for third place, as Thomas defeated Zalatoris in a playoff. Pereira was the third player over the previous 20 years to double-bogey the 72nd hole in a major and finish one shot out of a playoff; Phil Mickelson and Colin Montgomerie both did it at the 2006 U.S. Open.

Pereira qualified for the International team at the 2022 Presidents Cup; he played three matches, tying one and losing two.

In February 2023, it was announced that Pereira joined LIV Golf and will participate as a team member of Torque GC, alongside team captain and fellow Chilean Joaquín Niemann. Pereira finished runner-up at LIV Golf Greenbrier in August 2023. He also had three other top-5 finishes and placed at No. 8 in the 2023 LIV Golf League seasonal rankings.

Pereira narrowly avoided relegation during the 2024 LIV Golf League season, finishing at No. 47 in the rankings. In the 2025 LIV Golf League season, he finished No. 51, outside the top-48 cutoff, and was relegated. Pereira made over US$11.5 million during his three seasons on LIV Golf.

In December 2025, Pereira announced his retirement from professional golf. He stated: "I spent many years living away from home, in another country, countless weeks in hotels and airports. Now, the time has come to pause. Chile is my place in the world, and my family is my reason for being."

== Personal life ==
In December 2021, Pereira married Antonia Prida, whom he had known since childhood. They had their first child in 2024.

Pereira appeared in the sports documentary series Full Swing, which premiered on Netflix on February 15, 2023.

== Amateur wins ==
- 2008 Optimist International Junior Golf Championship
- 2013 Golden Cup, Abierto Las Brisas de Santo Domingo, Abierto Las Araucarias, Los Leones Amateur, Campeonato de Chile Match Play, Abierto Las Brisas De Chicureo
- 2014 Abierto de Marbella, Abierto de Granadilla, Abierto Las Brisas de Santo Domingo, Abierto La Posada, Campeonato Internacional de Aficionados Copa Carlos Raffo, Los Leones Amateur, Campeonato de Aficionados de Chile - Match Play

== Professional wins (13) ==
=== Korn Ferry Tour wins (3) ===
No.	Date	Tournament	Winning score	Margin of victory	Runner-up
1	9 Feb 2020	Country Club de Bogotá Championship	−20 (65-66-68-64=263)	2 strokes	(United States) Ben Kohles
2	6 Jun 2021	Rex Hospital Open	−21 (62-67-67-67=263)	Playoff	(Germany) Stephan Jäger
3	13 Jun 2021	BMW Charity Pro-Am	−27 (65-63-66-64=258)	4 strokes	(United States) Justin Lower

Korn Ferry Tour playoff record (1–1)

No.	Year	Tournament	Opponent(s)	Result
1	2021	Huntsville Championship	(France) Paul Barjon, (United States) Billy Kennerly	Barjon won with eagle on third extra hole
2	2021	Rex Hospital Open	(Germany) Stephan Jäger	Won with birdie on first extra hole

=== PGA Tour Latinoamérica wins (1) ===
No.	Date	Tournament	Winning score	Margin of victory	Runner-up
1	16 Oct 2016	Roberto De Vicenzo Punta del Este Open Copa NEC	−16 (64-67-70-63=264)	5 strokes	(United States) Tom Whitney

=== TPG Tour wins (1) ===
No.	Date	Tournament	Winning score	Margin of victory	Runner-up
1	25 Nov 2018	Andrés Romero Invitational	−11 (71-66-68=205)	2 strokes	(Argentina) Paulo Pinto

=== Chilean Tour wins (8) ===
No.	Date	Tournament	Winning score	Margin of victory	Runner(s)-up
1	28 Sep 2013	Abierto Las Brisas de Chicureo (as an amateur)	−6 (70-70-70=210)	1 stroke	(Chile) Nicolás Geyger, (Chile) Cristián León
2	13 Sep 2015	Abierto de Marina Golf Rapel	−9 (70-65=135)	4 strokes	(Chile) Lucas Morandé
3	19 Dec 2015	Abierto del Club de Polo	−9 (70-68-69=207)	4 strokes	(Chile) Juan Cerda
4	10 Jan 2016	Abierto de Cachagua	−12 (65-68-71=204)	4 strokes	(Chile) Juan Cerda, (Chile) Gabriel Morgan-Birke
5	26 Nov 2017	Abierto Hacienda Chicureo	−13 (72-66-65=203)	5 strokes	(Chile) Gustavo Silva
6	6 Jan 2019	Abierto de Cachagua (2)	−23 (64-67-62=193)	7 strokes	(Chile) Joaquín Niemann
7	19 Jan 2019	Abierto Marbella	−24 (64-67-65-68=264)	3 strokes	(Chile) Juan Cerda
8	27 Jan 2019	Abierto Rocas de Santo Domingo	−19 (67-64-67-71=269)	3 strokes	(Chile) Mark Tullo

== Playoff record ==
Other playoff record (0–1)

No.	Year	Tournament	Opponents	Result
1	2019	Pan American Games	(Guatemala) José Toledo, (Paraguay) Fabrizio Zanotti	Zanotti won with birdie on first extra hole

== Results in major championships ==
Tournament	2019	2020	2021	2022	2023
Masters Tournament					T43
PGA Championship				T3	T18
U.S. Open	CUT			CUT	CUT
The Open Championship		NT		CUT	

Top 10
Did not play

CUT = missed the half-way cut
"T" indicates a tie for a place
NT = No tournament due to COVID-19 pandemic

== Results in The Players Championship ==
Tournament	2022
The Players Championship	CUT

CUT = missed the halfway cut

== Team appearances ==
Amateur

- Eisenhower Trophy (representing Chile): 2014

Professional

- Presidents Cup (representing the International team): 2022

== See also ==
- 2021 Korn Ferry Tour Finals graduates
- List of golfers to achieve a three-win promotion from the Korn Ferry Tour
