= 2020–21 Korn Ferry Tour =

Golf tour season

2020–21 Korn Ferry Tour season
- Duration: January 12, 2020 – September 5, 2021
- Number of official events: 46 (Note: A further 10 tournaments were scheduled but were canceled.)
- Most wins: (Chile) Mito Pereira (3)
- Regular season points list: (Germany) Stephan Jäger
- Finals points list: (United States) Joseph Bramlett
- Player of the Year: (Germany) Stephan Jäger
- Rookie of the Year: (United States) Greyson Sigg

The 2020–21 Korn Ferry Tour was the 31st season of the Korn Ferry Tour, the official development tour to the PGA Tour.

== In-season changes ==
Originally scheduled to run from January 12 to August 30, it was announced in early May 2020 that due to disruption caused by the COVID-19 pandemic that the in-progress and on-hold 2020 season would be merged with the planned 2021 season.

With the season having been extended through 2021, there were no graduates to the PGA Tour for the 2020–21 season. However the leading 10 players in the Korn Ferry Tour points standings through the 2020 Korn Ferry Tour Championship were granted exemptions to play in four alternate events on the PGA Tour during 2021.

== Schedule ==
The following table lists official events during the 2020–21 season.

Date	Tournament	Location	Purse (US$)	Winner (Note: The number in parentheses after each winner's name is the number of Korn Ferry Tour events they had won up to and including that tournament. This information is only shown for Korn Ferry Tour members. It is rare for someone to accumulate many wins on the Korn Ferry Tour as success at this level usually leads to promotion to the PGA Tour.)	OWGR points	Notes
Jan 15, 2020	The Bahamas Great Exuma Classic	Bahamas	600,000	(United States) Tommy Gainey (3)	14	
Jan 22, 2020	The Bahamas Great Abaco Classic	Bahamas	600,000	(United States) Jared Wolfe (1)	14	
Feb 2, 2020	Panama Championship	Panama	625,000	(United States) Davis Riley (1)	14	
Feb 9, 2020	Country Club de Bogotá Championship	Colombia	700,000	(Chile) Mito Pereira (1)	14	
Feb 16, 2020	LECOM Suncoast Classic	Florida	600,000	(United States) Andrew Novak (1)	14	
Mar 1, 2020	El Bosque Mexico Championship	Mexico	650,000	(United States) David Kocher (1)	14	
~~Mar 22, 2020~~	Chitimacha Louisiana Open	Louisiana	–	Canceled	–	
~~Mar 29, 2020~~	Lake Charles Championship	Louisiana	–	Canceled	–	New tournament
~~Apr 19, 2020~~	Veritex Bank Championship	Texas	–	Canceled	–	New tournament
~~Apr 26, 2020~~	Huntsville Championship	Alabama	–	Canceled	–	New tournament
~~May 3, 2020~~	Simmons Bank Open	Tennessee	–	Canceled	–	
~~May 10, 2020~~	KC Golf Classic	Missouri	–	Canceled	–	
~~May 17, 2020~~	Visit Knoxville Open	Tennessee	–	Canceled	–	
~~May 31, 2020~~	Rex Hospital Open	North Carolina	–	Canceled	–	
~~Jun 7, 2020~~	BMW Charity Pro-Am	South Carolina	–	Canceled	–	Pro-Am
~~Jun 14, 2020~~	Live and Work in Maine Open	Maine	–	Canceled	–	New tournament
Jun 14, 2020	Korn Ferry Challenge	Florida	600,000	(United States) Luke List (2)	14	New tournament
Jun 20, 2020	King & Bear Classic	Florida	600,000	(United States) Chris Kirk (3)	14	New tournament
Jun 28, 2020	Utah Championship	Utah	650,000	(United States) Kyle Jones (1)	14	
Jul 4, 2020; ~~Jul 12, 2020~~	TPC Colorado Championship	Colorado	600,000	(United States) Will Zalatoris (1)	14	
Jul 12, 2020	TPC San Antonio Challenge	Texas	600,000	(United States) David Lipsky (1)	14	New tournament
Jul 18, 2020	TPC San Antonio Championship	Texas	600,000	(United States) Davis Riley (2)	14	New tournament
Jul 26, 2020	Price Cutter Charity Championship	Missouri	650,000	(United States) Max McGreevy (1)	14	
Aug 2, 2020	Pinnacle Bank Championship	Nebraska	600,000	(United States) Seth Reeves (1)	14	
Aug 9, 2020	WinCo Foods Portland Open	Oregon	800,000	(United States) Lee Hodges (1)	14	Championship Series
Aug 16, 2020	Albertsons Boise Open	Idaho	1,000,000	(Germany) Stephan Jäger (5)	14	Championship Series
Aug 23, 2020	Nationwide Children's Hospital Championship	Ohio	1,000,000	(Australia) Curtis Luck (1)	14	Championship Series
Aug 30, 2020	Korn Ferry Tour Championship	Indiana	1,000,000	(United States) Brandon Wu (1)	20	Championship Series
Sep 6, 2020; ~~Jul 19, 2020~~	Lincoln Land Championship	Illinois	600,000	(Australia) Brett Drewitt (1)	14	
Sep 13, 2020; ~~May 24, 2020~~	Evans Scholars Invitational	Illinois	600,000	(United States) Curtis Thompson (1)	14	
Sep 27, 2020; ~~Jun 21, 2020~~	Wichita Open	Kansas	600,000	(United States) Jared Wolfe (2)	14	
Oct 4, 2020; ~~Apr 5, 2020~~	Savannah Golf Championship	Georgia	600,000	(United States) Evan Harmeling (1)	14	
Oct 11, 2020	Orange County National Championship	Florida	600,000	(United States) Trey Mullinax (2)	14	New tournament
Feb 21, 2021	LECOM Suncoast Classic	Florida	600,000	(United States) Hayden Buckley (1)	14	
Mar 21, 2021	Chitimacha Louisiana Open	Louisiana	600,000	(Mexico) Roberto Díaz (1)	14	
Mar 28, 2021	Club Car Championship	Georgia	600,000	(Canada) Adam Svensson (2)	14	
Apr 4, 2021	Emerald Coast Classic	Florida	600,000	(Germany) Stephan Jäger (6)	14	New tournament
Apr 18, 2021	MGM Resorts Championship	Nevada	600,000	(United States) Peter Uihlein (2)	14	New tournament
Apr 25, 2021	Veritex Bank Championship	Texas	600,000	(United States) Tyson Alexander (1)	14	New tournament (Note: Tournament's debut delayed from 2020.)
May 2, 2021	Huntsville Championship	Alabama	600,000	(France) Paul Barjon (1)	14	New tournament
May 9, 2021	Simmons Bank Open	Tennessee	600,000	(United States) Austin Smotherman (1)	14	
May 16, 2021	Visit Knoxville Open	Tennessee	600,000	(United States) Greyson Sigg (1)	14	
May 23, 2021	AdventHealth Championship	Missouri	675,000	(United States) Cameron Young (1)	14	
May 30, 2021	Evans Scholars Invitational	Illinois	600,000	(United States) Cameron Young (2)	14	
Jun 6, 2021	Rex Hospital Open	North Carolina	650,000	(Chile) Mito Pereira (2)	14	
Jun 13, 2021	BMW Charity Pro-Am	South Carolina	700,000	(Chile) Mito Pereira (3) (Note: Pereira earned immediate promotion to the PGA Tour, as this was his third win of the season.)	14	Pro-Am
Jun 20, 2021	Wichita Open	Kansas	600,000	(England) Harry Hall (1)	14	
Jun 27, 2021	Live and Work in Maine Open	Maine	600,000	(United States) Chad Ramey (1)	14	New tournament
Jul 11, 2021	TPC Colorado Championship	Colorado	600,000	(United States) Tag Ridings (2)	14	
Jul 18, 2021	Memorial Health Championship	Illinois	600,000	(United States) Taylor Moore (1)	14	
Jul 25, 2021	Price Cutter Charity Championship	Missouri	600,000	(United States) Dylan Wu (1)	14	
Aug 8, 2021	Utah Championship	Utah	600,000	(United States) Joshua Creel (1)	14	
Aug 15, 2021	Pinnacle Bank Championship	Nebraska	750,000	(England) David Skinns (2)	14	
Aug 22, 2021	Albertsons Boise Open	Idaho	1,000,000	(United States) Greyson Sigg (2)	18	Finals event
Aug 29, 2021	Nationwide Children's Hospital Championship	Ohio	1,000,000	(Canada) Adam Svensson (3)	20	Finals event
Sep 5, 2021	Korn Ferry Tour Championship	Indiana	1,000,000	(United States) Joseph Bramlett (1)	20	Finals event

== Location of tournaments ==
Location of tournaments of the 2020–21 Korn Ferry Tour in the United States and the Bahamas.
Tour championship
Championship Series events
Regular-season events
Location of tournaments of the 2020–21 Korn Ferry Tour outside the United States and the Bahamas.

== Points list ==
=== Regular season points list ===
The regular season points list was based on tournament results during the season, calculated using a points-based system. The top 25 players on the regular season points list earned status to play on the 2021–22 PGA Tour.

Position	Player	Points
1	(Germany) Stephan Jäger	2,804
2	(Chile) Mito Pereira	2,556
3	(United States) Chad Ramey	2,480
4	(United States) Taylor Moore	2,271
5	(Canada) Taylor Pendrith	2,154

=== Finals points list ===
The Finals points list was based on tournament results during the Korn Ferry Tour Finals, calculated using a points-based system. The top 25 players on the Finals points list (not otherwise exempt) earned status to play on the 2021–22 PGA Tour.

Position	Player	Points
1	(United States) Joseph Bramlett	1,139
2	(Canada) Adam Svensson	1,138
3	(United States) Greyson Sigg	1,037
4	(Germany) Stephan Jäger	720
5	(United States) Trey Mullinax	700

=== 2021 PGA Tour exemptions ===
The leading 10 players in the Korn Ferry Tour points list through the 2020 Korn Ferry Tour Championship were granted exemptions to play in the Puerto Rico Open, the Corales Puntacana Resort and Club Championship, the Barbasol Championship and the Barracuda Championship on the PGA Tour during 2021. They were as follows:

- Paul Barjon
- Lee Hodges
- Stephan Jäger
- David Lipsky
- Taylor Pendrith
- Mito Pereira
- Davis Riley
- Greyson Sigg
- Brandon Wu
- Will Zalatoris

== Awards ==
Award	Winner	Ref.
Player of the Year (Jack Nicklaus Trophy)	(Germany) Stephan Jäger	
Rookie of the Year	(United States) Greyson Sigg	
