= 2023 Players Championship =

Golf tournament

Tournament information
- Dates: March 9–12, 2023
- Location: Ponte Vedra Beach, Florida; 30.198°N 81.394°W
- Courses: TPC Sawgrass (Stadium Course)
- Tour: PGA Tour

Statistics
- Par: 72
- Field: 144 players, 75 after cut
- Cut: 146 (+2)
- Prize fund: US$25,000,000
- Winner's share: US$4,500,000

Champion
- (United States) Scottie Scheffler
- 271 (−17)
- Location in the United States Location in Florida

The 2023 Players Championship was the 49th playing of the Players Championship, having been played at TPC Sawgrass in Ponte Vedra Beach, Florida from March 9–12.

The winner was Scottie Scheffler, who shot a 69 in the final round to finish at 271 (−17) to win his first Players Championship, five strokes ahead of runner-up Tyrrell Hatton.

Defending champion Cameron Smith became the first player since 2014 not to defend the title, being one of many players ineligible to compete having been suspended by the PGA Tour after joining LIV Golf. Other ineligible players included both the runner-up and third-place finishers from 2022, Anirban Lahiri and Paul Casey.

== Field ==
The field consists of 144 players meeting various criteria; they include tournament winners on the PGA Tour since the previous Players Championship, recent winners of major championships, The Players and World Golf Championships, and leading players in the FedEx Cup standings from the current and preceding seasons.

=== Eligibility criteria ===
This list details the eligibility criteria for the 2023 Players Championship and the players who qualified under them; any additional criteria under which players were eligible is indicated in parentheses.

1. Winners of PGA Tour events since the 2022 Players Championship

- Keegan Bradley (2,16,17)
- Sam Burns (2,16)
- Patrick Cantlay (2,8,14,16)
- Nico Echavarría
- Tony Finau (2,16,17)
- Matt Fitzpatrick (2,5,16)
- Russell Henley (2,16)
- Max Homa (2,15,16,17)
- Billy Horschel (2,10,14,16)
- Mackenzie Hughes (2)
- Kim Si-woo (2,4,16,17)
- Tom Kim (2,16,17)
- Chris Kirk (2,16,17)
- Kurt Kitayama (2,13,16)
- Lee Kyoung-hoon (2,16)
- Rory McIlroy (2,4,8,12,16)
- Trey Mullinax (2)
- J. T. Poston (2)
- Séamus Power (2,16,17)
- Jon Rahm (2,5,14,15,16,17)
- Chad Ramey (2)
- Chez Reavie (2)
- Justin Rose (2,16)
- Xander Schauffele (2,16)
- Scottie Scheffler (2,3,10,13,16,17)
- J. J. Spaun (2)
- Jordan Spieth (2,7,16)
- Adam Svensson (2)
- Justin Thomas (2,4,6,11,16)
- Will Zalatoris (2,16)

2. Top 125 from the previous season's FedEx Cup Playoffs and Eligibility Points List (Note: The FedEx Cup Playoffs and Eligibility Points List was introduced during the 2021–22 PGA Tour season and replaced the FedEx Cup Standings as a criterion; the new list did not include players suspended by the tour, such as those who had joined LIV Golf. After the end of the 2021–22 regular season, a further six players who had joined LIV Golf (Lahiri, Leishman, Neimann, Smith, Tringale and Varner) were removed from the list, moving Wallace, Smotherman, Lower, Redman, Willett and Kraft (the players ranked 126 to 131 in the points list as of August 7, 2022) into the top-125.)

- Christiaan Bezuidenhout
- Ryan Brehm
- Hayden Buckley
- Stewart Cink
- Wyndham Clark
- Corey Conners (16)
- Joel Dahmen
- Cameron Davis
- Jason Day (16)
- Tyler Duncan
- Tommy Fleetwood (16)
- Rickie Fowler
- Dylan Frittelli
- Doug Ghim
- Lucas Glover
- Emiliano Grillo
- Chesson Hadley
- Adam Hadwin
- James Hahn
- Brian Harman (16)
- Tyrrell Hatton (13,16)
- Lucas Herbert
- Kramer Hickok
- Lee Hodges
- Tom Hoge (16)
- Beau Hossler
- Viktor Hovland (16)
- Mark Hubbard
- Im Sung-jae (16)
- Stephan Jäger
- Kevin Kisner (10,16)
- Patton Kizzire
- Russell Knox
- Kelly Kraft
- Matt Kuchar
- Martin Laird
- Nate Lashley
- David Lipsky
- Luke List
- Adam Long
- Justin Lower
- Shane Lowry (7,16)
- Peter Malnati
- Hideki Matsuyama (3)
- Denny McCarthy
- Max McGreevy
- Maverick McNealy
- Troy Merritt
- Keith Mitchell (16)
- Taylor Moore
- Collin Morikawa (6,7,9,16)
- Matthew NeSmith
- Alex Norén (16)
- Ryan Palmer
- Taylor Pendrith
- Scott Piercy
- Andrew Putnam
- Aaron Rai
- Doc Redman
- Davis Riley
- Patrick Rodgers
- Sam Ryder
- Adam Schenk
- Matthias Schwab
- Adam Scott (15,16)
- Greyson Sigg
- Webb Simpson (4)
- Alex Smalley
- Austin Smotherman
- Scott Stallings
- Sepp Straka (16)
- Robert Streb
- Kevin Streelman
- Callum Tarren
- Nick Taylor
- Sahith Theegala (16,17)
- Michael Thompson
- Brendon Todd
- Kevin Tway
- Jhonattan Vegas
- Matt Wallace
- Nick Watney
- Danny Willett
- Aaron Wise (16)
- Gary Woodland (5)
- Brandon Wu
- Cameron Young (16)
- Daniel Berger, Lanto Griffin, John Huh, Pan Cheng-tsung and Vince Whaley did not play.

3. Recent winners of the Masters Tournament (2018–2022)

- Tiger Woods did not play.

4. Recent winners of The Players Championship (2017–2022)

5. Recent winners of the U.S. Open (2017–2022)

6. Recent winners of the PGA Championship (2017–2022)

7. Recent winners of The Open Championship (2017–2022)

- Francesco Molinari

8. Recent winners of the FedEx Cup (2019/20–2021/22)

9. Recent winners of the WGC Championship (2020–2021)

10. Recent winners of the WGC Match Play (2019–2022)

11. Recent winners of the WGC Invitational (2019–2021)

12. Recent winners of the WGC-HSBC Champions (2019)

13. Recent winners of the Arnold Palmer Invitational (2020–2023)

14. Recent winners of the Memorial Tournament (2019–2022)

15. Recent winners of the Genesis Invitational (2020–2023)

16. Top 50 from the Official World Golf Ranking following The Honda Classic

- Ryan Fox
- Min Woo Lee

17. Top 10 in the current season's FedEx Cup points standings after The Honda Classic

18. Senior Players champion from previous year

- Jerry Kelly

19. Leading points winners from the Korn Ferry Tour and Korn Ferry Tour Finals during the previous year

- Justin Suh (led both categories)

20. Top 125 (medical extension)

- Nick Hardy

21. Remaining positions and alternates filled through current year FedEx Cup standings following The Honda Classic

- Taylor Montgomery (14)
- Thomas Detry (17)
- Davis Thompson (31)
- Eric Cole (33)
- Ben Griffin (37)
- Robby Shelton (47)
- Tyson Alexander (48)
- Garrick Higgo (50)
- Kim Seong-hyeon (53)
- An Byeong-hun (57)
- Will Gordon (61)
- Joseph Bramlett (62)
- David Lingmerth (63)
- Harris English (73)
- Aaron Baddeley (75)
- Ben Martin (79)
- Harrison Endycott (87)
- Andrew Novak (102)
- Erik Barnes (110)
- Dylan Wu (111)
- Ryan Armour (112) (Note: Ryan Armour replaced Lanto Griffin.)
- Ben Taylor (27) and Kevin Yu (51) did not play.

==== Ineligible players ====
The following players met criteria but, having joined LIV Golf, were suspended by the PGA Tour and ineligible to compete:

- Abraham Ancer (11,16)
- Bryson DeChambeau (5,13)
- Talor Gooch (16)
- Dustin Johnson (3,8)
- Brooks Koepka (5,6,11)
- Anirban Lahiri (2)
- Danny Lee (2)
- Marc Leishman (2)
- Phil Mickelson (6)
- Sebastián Muñoz (2)
- Joaquín Niemann (2,15,16)
- Mito Pereira (2,16)
- Thomas Pieters (16)
- Patrick Reed (9)
- Cameron Smith (1,2,4,7,16)
- Brendan Steele (2)
- Cameron Tringale (2)
- Harold Varner III (2,16)

== Round summaries ==
=== First round ===
Thursday, March 9, 2023
Friday, March 10, 2023

Due to lack of daylight, play was suspended at 6:30 pm EST Thursday with 21 players yet to complete their opening rounds.

Chad Ramey, ranked 225 in the Official World Golf Ranking and making his Players Championship debut, recorded a bogey-free round of 64 (8 under par) to take the first-round lead. He birdied the par-5 16th hole to tie for the lead, before hitting his tee shot on the 17th hole to within two feet, setting up another birdie and moving him atop the leaderboard.

Collin Morikawa also did not make a bogey in a seven-under par round of 65, that included an eagle on the par-5 second hole. He finished alone in second place, one stroke behind Ramey.

The top-three players in the world rankings: Jon Rahm, Scottie Scheffler, and Rory McIlroy; were drawn together, but only Scheffler made his way into the top-10 at the end of the round. After beginning his round with nine straight pars, Scheffler birdied three of his final four holes to finish at four-under par (68). Rahm did not make a birdie on his back-nine that included a bogey on the par-3 eighth hole, his 17th, finishing at one-under par (71). McIlroy, the 2019 champion, double-bogeyed his opening hole in a round of 76 (4 over par).

Hayden Buckley made a hole-in-one on the 17th during his round of 73 (1 over par).

Place	Player	Score	To par
1	(United States) Chad Ramey	64	−8
2	(United States) Collin Morikawa	65	−7
T3	(United States) Ben Griffin	67	−5
T3	(Canada) Taylor Pendrith	67	−5
T5	(South Africa) Christiaan Bezuidenhout	68	−4
T5	(United States) Sam Burns	68	−4
T5	(Australia) Min Woo Lee	68	−4
T5	(United States) Denny McCarthy	68	−4
T5	(United States) Scottie Scheffler	68	−4
T5	(United States) Justin Suh	68	−4
T5	(Canada) Adam Svensson	68	−4

=== Second round ===
Friday, March 10, 2023
Saturday, March 11, 2023

Adam Svensson birdied the par-5 ninth hole, the last of his round, after getting a free drop from the hospitality tent on his second shot to finish off a five-under round of 67 and take a two-shot lead through 36 holes at nine-under.

Scottie Scheffler made three birdies on his back-nine and shot 69 (−3) to move into second place at seven-under. Christiaan Bezuidenhout shared the lead with Svensson when play was suspended but bogeyed two of his final three holes on Saturday morning to fall back to a share of third place at six-under, three behind.

Overnight leader Chad Ramey birdied two of his first three holes and led by as many as three shots early in his round before putting two balls in the water on the par-3 17th, leading to a quadruple-bogey. He ended up at five-under, four back, after a round of 75 (+3).

Jerry Kelly became the oldest player to make the cut in Players Championship history, surpassing Arnold Palmer, who had held the record for making the cut in the 1985 Tournament Players Championship at 55 years, 6 months and 19 days. Kelly was 56 years, 3 months and 16 days old.

The cut came in at 146 (+2), with 75 players making it to the weekend. Notables to miss the cut included 2019 champion Rory McIlroy, 2018 champion Webb Simpson, and 2022 U.S. Open champion Matt Fitzpatrick. World No. 1 Jon Rahm withdrew before the start of his second round due to illness.

Due to heavy rain and thunderstorms, play was suspended at 4:27 pm EST Friday. It was the second year in a row that the second round play was not completed on the Friday due to severe weather. The PGA Tour announced that play would resume on Saturday at 7:00 am, with the third round starting around 10:45, with players in groups of three, instead of the usual two, and commencing from both the first and tenth tees.

Place	Player	Score	To par
1	(Canada) Adam Svensson	68-67=135	−9
2	(United States) Scottie Scheffler	68-69=137	−7
T3	(South Africa) Christiaan Bezuidenhout	68-70=138	−6
T3	(United States) Ben Griffin	67-71=138	−6
T3	(Australia) Min Woo Lee	68-70=138	−6
T3	(United States) Collin Morikawa	65-73=138	−6
T7	(Australia) Cameron Davis	69-70=139	−5
T7	(United States) Chad Ramey	64-75=139	−5
T9	(Australia) Jason Day	70-70=140	−4
T9	(United States) Will Gordon	73-67=140	−4
T9	(Norway) Viktor Hovland	69-71=140	−4
T9	(United States) Nate Lashley	69-71=140	−4
T9	(Sweden) David Lingmerth	72-68=140	−4
T9	(United States) Denny McCarthy	68-72=140	−4
T9	(Canada) Taylor Pendrith	67-73=140	−4
T9	(United States) Brendon Todd	71-69=140	−4

=== Third round ===
Saturday, March 11, 2023

Scottie Scheffler moved into the lead with a birdie on his first hole followed by chipping in for eagle on the second. He made five more birdies during the rest of his round for a round of 65 (7 under par) which gave him a two-shot lead through 54 holes at 14 under par.

Min Woo Lee began his round by holing out from 112 yards on the first hole for an eagle. He joined Scheffler in the lead with a birdie on the 11th hole, then moved one ahead with another birdie on the 12th, before falling behind again over the final six holes. His round of 66 (6 under par) put him at 12 under par, two strokes behind Scheffler.

Aaron Rai made a hole-in-one on the 17th hole in a seven-under round of 65, moving him into a tie for fourth place. With Hayden Buckley in the first round, it marked the first time in Players Championship history two players had made a hole-in-one on the 17th hole in the same tournament.

Tom Hoge, who had made the cut on the number, set a tournament record with a round of 62; he made ten birdies during his round, ending with a 10-foot putt on the ninth hole, his last. He moved from a tie for 65th place at the start of the round up to a tie for eighth.

Second-round leader Adam Svensson was even-par on his round before a triple-bogey on the par-4 14th hole dropped him back to six-under and 14th place.

The scoring average for the round was 69.57, the lowest in Players Championship history.

Scorecard of Tom Hoge

Hole	10	11	12	13	14	15	16	17	18	1	2	3	4	5	6	7	8	9
Par	4	5	4	3	4	4	5	3	4	4	5	3	4	4	4	4	3	5
(United States) Hoge	+2	+1	E	E	E	−1	−2	−2	−3	−3	−4	−5	−6	−6	−6	−6	−7	−8

Place	Player	Score	To par
1	(United States) Scottie Scheffler	68-69-65=202	−14
2	(Australia) Min Woo Lee	68-70-66=204	−12
3	(Australia) Cameron Davis	69-70-67=206	−10
T4	(South Africa) Christiaan Bezuidenhout	68-70-69=207	−9
T4	(England) Tommy Fleetwood	72-70-65=207	−9
T4	(England) Aaron Rai	73-69-65=207	−9
T4	(United States) Chad Ramey	64-75-68=207	−9
T8	(United States) Tom Hoge	78-68-62=208	−8
T8	(South Korea) Im Sung-jae	75-69-64=208	−8
T8	(Sweden) David Lingmerth	72-68-68=208	−8

=== Final round ===
Sunday, March 12, 2023

After a birdie on the first hole by Min Woo Lee and a bogey by Scottie Scheffler on the third hole, the two players were tied for the lead at 13 under par. On the fourth hole, Lee made a triple-bogey having hit his third shot into the water; he dropped further behind as the round went on and finished in a tie for sixth at eight under par. Starting the day at five under par, Hideki Matsuyama was seven under par for his round through 13 holes, and one stroke behind at 12 under par, before he made a double bogey on the 14th hole; a further dropped shot on the final hole meant he finished at 9 under par, good enough for fifth place on his own.

Through the middle of the round, Scheffler made five consecutive birdies to reach 18 under par and open a six stroke lead over the rest of the field. He made one bogey and five pars over the closing six holes to finish with a round of 69 (3 under par), and at 17 under par, win his first Players Championship title by five strokes.

Tyrrell Hatton began the round nine shots off the lead, in a tie for 26th place; he was even-par on the front-nine before making seven birdies in taking 29 strokes to play the back-nine, tying the tournament record, for a round of 65 (7 under par) to finish alone in second place at 12 under par. Tom Hoge and Viktor Hovland finished with rounds of 70 and 68 respectively to finish tied for third place. Max Homa went birdie-eagle-birdie on the 10th, 11th and 12th holes to reach 10-under and move into a tie for second; after a run of pars, he made a double-bogey on the 17th hole after his tee shot found the water to fall back to eight under par. Finishing alongside Homa and Lee in a tie for sixth place were Cameron Davis, Im Sung-jae, David Lingmerth, Justin Rose and Justin Suh.

Alex Smalley made a hole-in-one on the 17th hole; the first time there had been three holes-in-one recorded at the same hole during a tournament in Players Championship history.

Champion
(c) = past champion

Place	Player	Score	To par	Money ($)
1	(United States) Scottie Scheffler	68-69-65-69=271	−17	4,500,000
2	(England) Tyrrell Hatton	72-71-68-65=276	−12	2,725,000
T3	(United States) Tom Hoge	78-68-62-70=278	−10	1,475,000
T3	(Norway) Viktor Hovland	69-71-70-68=278	−10	1,475,000
5	(Japan) Hideki Matsuyama	74-70-67-68=279	−9	1,025,000
T6	(Australia) Cameron Davis	69-70-67-74=280	−8	736,607
T6	(United States) Max Homa	72-72-67-69=280	−8	736,607
T6	(South Korea) Im Sung-jae	75-69-64-72=280	−8	736,607
T6	(Australia) Min Woo Lee	68-70-66-76=280	−8	736,607
T6	(Sweden) David Lingmerth	72-68-68-72=280	−8	736,607
T6	(England) Justin Rose	69-73-67-71=280	−8	736,607
T6	(United States) Justin Suh	68-73-69-70=280	−8	736,607

Leaderboard below the top 10
Place	Player	Score	To par	Money ($)
T13	(South Africa) Christiaan Bezuidenhout	68-70-69-74=281	−7	447,916
T13	(United States) Rickie Fowler (c)	72-70-68-71=281	−7	447,916
T13	(Canada) Adam Hadwin	71-70-69-71=281	−7	447,916
T13	(United States) Denny McCarthy	68-72-69-72=281	−7	447,916
T13	(United States) Collin Morikawa	65-73-72-71=281	−7	447,916
T13	(Canada) Adam Svensson	68-67-75-71=281	−7	447,916
T19	(United States) Patrick Cantlay	72-70-68-72=282	−6	275,000
T19	(Australia) Jason Day (c)	70-70-70-72=282	−6	275,000
T19	(United States) Tony Finau	73-72-66-71=282	−6	275,000
T19	(United States) Russell Henley	72-74-66-70=282	−6	275,000
T19	(England) Aaron Rai	73-69-65-75=282	−6	275,000
T19	(United States) Xander Schauffele	72-73-69-68=282	−6	275,000
T19	(United States) Jordan Spieth	69-75-66-72=282	−6	275,000
T19	(United States) Brandon Wu	73-69-69-71=282	−6	275,000
T27	(United States) Wyndham Clark	69-73-69-72=283	−5	167,656
T27	(United States) Eric Cole	73-73-69-68=283	−5	167,656
T27	(England) Tommy Fleetwood	72-70-65-76=283	−5	167,656
T27	(New Zealand) Ryan Fox	74-68-70-71=283	−5	167,656
T27	(South Korea) Kim Si-woo (c)	69-74-68-72=283	−5	167,656
T27	(United States) Chad Ramey	64-75-68-76=283	−5	167,656
T27	(United States) Brendon Todd	71-69-74-69=283	−5	167,656
T27	(England) Danny Willett	72-71-71-69=283	−5	167,656
T35	(South Korea) An Byeong-hun	71-70-70-73=284	−4	114,166
T35	(United States) Sam Burns	68-74-72-70=284	−4	114,166
T35	(United States) Ben Griffin	67-71-72-74=284	−4	114,166
T35	(United States) Mark Hubbard	71-72-70-71=284	−4	114,166
T35	(Republic of Ireland) Shane Lowry	77-69-68-70=284	−4	114,166
T35	(United States) Keith Mitchell	72-74-68-70=284	−4	114,166
T35	(United States) Taylor Moore	70-75-65-74=284	−4	114,166
T35	(United States) Austin Smotherman	73-72-69-70=284	−4	114,166
T35	(United States) Dylan Wu	69-73-68-74=284	−4	114,166
T44	(United States) Chesson Hadley	71-73-72-69=285	−3	75,035
T44	(United States) Brian Harman	73-71-70-71=285	−3	75,035
T44	(United States) Kramer Hickok	73-70-69-73=285	−3	75,035
T44	(South Africa) Garrick Higgo	70-73-68-74=285	−3	75,035
T44	(Germany) Stephan Jäger	74-72-69-70=285	−3	75,035
T44	(United States) Taylor Montgomery	70-73-66-76=285	−3	75,035
T44	(United States) Sam Ryder	73-72-69-71=285	−3	75,035
T51	(United States) Lucas Glover	69-74-71-72=286	−2	61,416
T51	(South Korea) Tom Kim	74-72-71-69=286	−2	61,416
T51	(United States) Cameron Young	71-73-68-74=286	−2	61,416
T54	(United States) Tyler Duncan	73-69-70-75=287	−1	
T54	(United States) Will Gordon	73-67-73-74=287	−1	
T54	(United States) Jerry Kelly	74-72-69-72=287	−1	
T54	(United States) Ben Martin	71-74-72-70=287	−1	
T54	(Austria) Matthias Schwab	75-70-72-70=287	−1	
T54	(United States) Gary Woodland	72-70-71-74=287	−1	
T60	(United States) Joel Dahmen	73-71-73-71=288	E	55,250
T60	(United States) Nate Lashley	69-71-73-75=288	E	55,250
T60	(United States) Maverick McNealy	74-71-70-73=288	E	55,250
T60	(Italy) Francesco Molinari	73-71-68-76=288	E	55,250
T60	(United States) Justin Thomas (c)	73-73-71-71=288	E	55,250
T65	(United States) Patton Kizzire	74-71-74-70=289	+1	53,250
T65	(United States) Alex Smalley	71-75-69-74=289	+1	53,250
T65	(Austria) Sepp Straka	74-72-74-69=289	+1	53,250
68	(United States) Davis Thompson	70-73-69-79=291	+3	52,250
T69	(Canada) Taylor Pendrith	67-73-72-80=292	+4	51,500
T69	(United States) Scott Stallings	71-74-72-75=292	+4	51,500
71	(Australia) Adam Scott (c)	72-73-77-71=293	+5	50,750
72	(Australia) Aaron Baddeley	73-72-74-76=295	+7	50,250
73	(United States) Will Zalatoris	74-71-74-77=296	+8	49,750
74	(United States) Sahith Theegala	70-75-78-75=298	+10	49,250
75	(United States) Kevin Kisner	72-73-73-81=299	+11	48,750
CUT	(United States) Hayden Buckley	73-74=147	+3	
CUT	(Belgium) Thomas Detry	78-69=147	+3	
CUT	(Australia) Harrison Endycott	70-77=147	+3	
CUT	(England) Matt Fitzpatrick	76-71=147	+3	
CUT	(Argentina) Emiliano Grillo	70-77=147	+3	
CUT	(United States) Luke List	77-70=147	+3	
CUT	(United States) Troy Merritt	74-73=147	+3	
CUT	(United States) Ryan Palmer	69-78=147	+3	
CUT	(United States) Scott Piercy	71-76=147	+3	
CUT	(United States) Andrew Putnam	73-74=147	+3	
CUT	(United States) J. J. Spaun	72-75=147	+3	
CUT	(United States) Kevin Streelman	71-76=147	+3	
CUT	(England) Matt Wallace	72-75=147	+3	
CUT	(United States) Keegan Bradley	70-78=148	+4	
CUT	(United States) Chris Kirk	73-75=148	+4	
CUT	(United States) Matt Kuchar (c)	70-78=148	+4	
CUT	(United States) Peter Malnati	72-76=148	+4	
CUT	(United States) Chez Reavie	72-76=148	+4	
CUT	(United States) Davis Riley	71-77=148	+4	
CUT	(United States) Patrick Rodgers	73-75=148	+4	
CUT	(United States) Adam Schenk	74-74=148	+4	
CUT	(United States) Kevin Tway	75-73=148	+4	
CUT	(United States) Joseph Bramlett	71-78=149	+5	
CUT	(United States) Harris English	78-71=149	+5	
CUT	(United States) James Hahn	73-76=149	+5	
CUT	(United States) Kurt Kitayama	73-76=149	+5	
CUT	(South Korea) Lee Kyoung-hoon	73-76=149	+5	
CUT	(Northern Ireland) Rory McIlroy (c)	76-73=149	+5	
CUT	(Sweden) Alex Norén	77-72=149	+5	
CUT	(Canada) Nick Taylor	74-75=149	+5	
CUT	(United States) Michael Thompson	77-72=149	+5	
CUT	(United States) Erik Barnes	74-76=150	+6	
CUT	(Canada) Corey Conners	75-75=150	+6	
CUT	(Colombia) Nico Echavarría	71-79=150	+6	
CUT	(United States) Nick Hardy	77-73=150	+6	
CUT	(United States) J. T. Poston	75-75=150	+6	
CUT	(Republic of Ireland) Séamus Power	74-76=150	+6	
CUT	(United States) Robby Shelton	72-78=150	+6	
CUT	(England) Callum Tarren	73-77=150	+6	
CUT	(United States) Ryan Armour	72-79=151	+7	
CUT	(South Africa) Dylan Frittelli	72-79=151	+7	
CUT	(Canada) Mackenzie Hughes	75-76=151	+7	
CUT	(United States) Justin Lower	74-77=151	+7	
CUT	(United States) Greyson Sigg	74-77=151	+7	
CUT	(United States) Robert Streb	78-73=151	+7	
CUT	(United States) Ryan Brehm	72-80=152	+8	
CUT	(United States) Billy Horschel	73-79=152	+8	
CUT	(United States) Beau Hossler	76-76=152	+8	
CUT	(Scotland) Russell Knox	75-77=152	+8	
CUT	(United States) Doc Redman	78-74=152	+8	
CUT	(United States) Webb Simpson (c)	76-76=152	+8	
CUT	(Venezuela) Jhonattan Vegas	78-74=152	+8	
CUT	(United States) Tyson Alexander	77-76=153	+9	
CUT	(United States) Stewart Cink	72-81=153	+9	
CUT	(United States) Lee Hodges	76-77=153	+9	
CUT	(South Korea) Kim Seong-hyeon	77-76=153	+9	
CUT	(United States) Adam Long	75-78=153	+9	
CUT	(United States) Doug Ghim	80-74=154	+10	
CUT	(United States) Andrew Novak	79-75=154	+10	
CUT	(United States) Matthew NeSmith	77-78=155	+11	
CUT	(United States) Kelly Kraft	80-76=156	+12	
CUT	(United States) David Lipsky	76-80=156	+12	
CUT	(United States) Trey Mullinax	71-85=156	+12	
CUT	(United States) Aaron Wise	80-76=156	+12	
CUT	(Scotland) Martin Laird	76-81=157	+13	
CUT	(United States) Max McGreevy	69-89=158	+14	
CUT	(United States) Nick Watney	79-79=158	+14	
CUT	(Australia) Lucas Herbert	82-85=167	+23	
WD	(Spain) Jon Rahm	71	−1	

==== Scorecard ====
Final round

Hole	1	2	3	4	5	6	7	8	9	10	11	12	13	14	15	16	17	18
Par	4	5	3	4	4	4	4	3	5	4	5	4	3	4	4	5	3	4
(United States) Scheffler	−14	−14	−13	−13	−13	−13	−13	−14	−15	−16	−17	−18	−18	−17	−17	−17	−17	−17
(England) Hatton	−5	−5	−5	−5	−5	−5	−5	−6	−5	−6	−6	−7	−7	−8	−9	−10	−11	−12
(United States) Hoge	−8	−9	−9	−9	−10	−8	−8	−8	−9	−9	−8	−8	−9	−9	−9	−10	−11	−10
(Norway) Hovland	−6	−7	−6	−7	−6	−6	−6	−6	−7	−7	−8	−9	−10	−10	−10	−10	−10	−10
(Japan) Matsuyama	−5	−5	−6	−6	−6	−7	−7	−8	−9	−9	−10	−11	−12	−10	−10	−10	−10	−9
(United States) Homa	−5	−6	−6	−6	−6	−6	−6	−6	−6	−7	−9	−10	−10	−10	−10	−10	−8	−8
(Australia) Lee	−13	−13	−13	−10	−10	−10	−11	−10	−10	−10	−8	−8	−8	−7	−7	−8	−9	−8

Cumulative tournament scores, relative to par

Eagle	Birdie	Bogey	Double bogey	Triple bogey+
