= Rahmbo =

Rahmbo is the nickname of the following people:

- Rahm Emanuel (born 1959), American politician and diplomat
- Jon Rahm (born 1994), Spanish golfer
