= 2026 PGA Championship =

Golf tournament

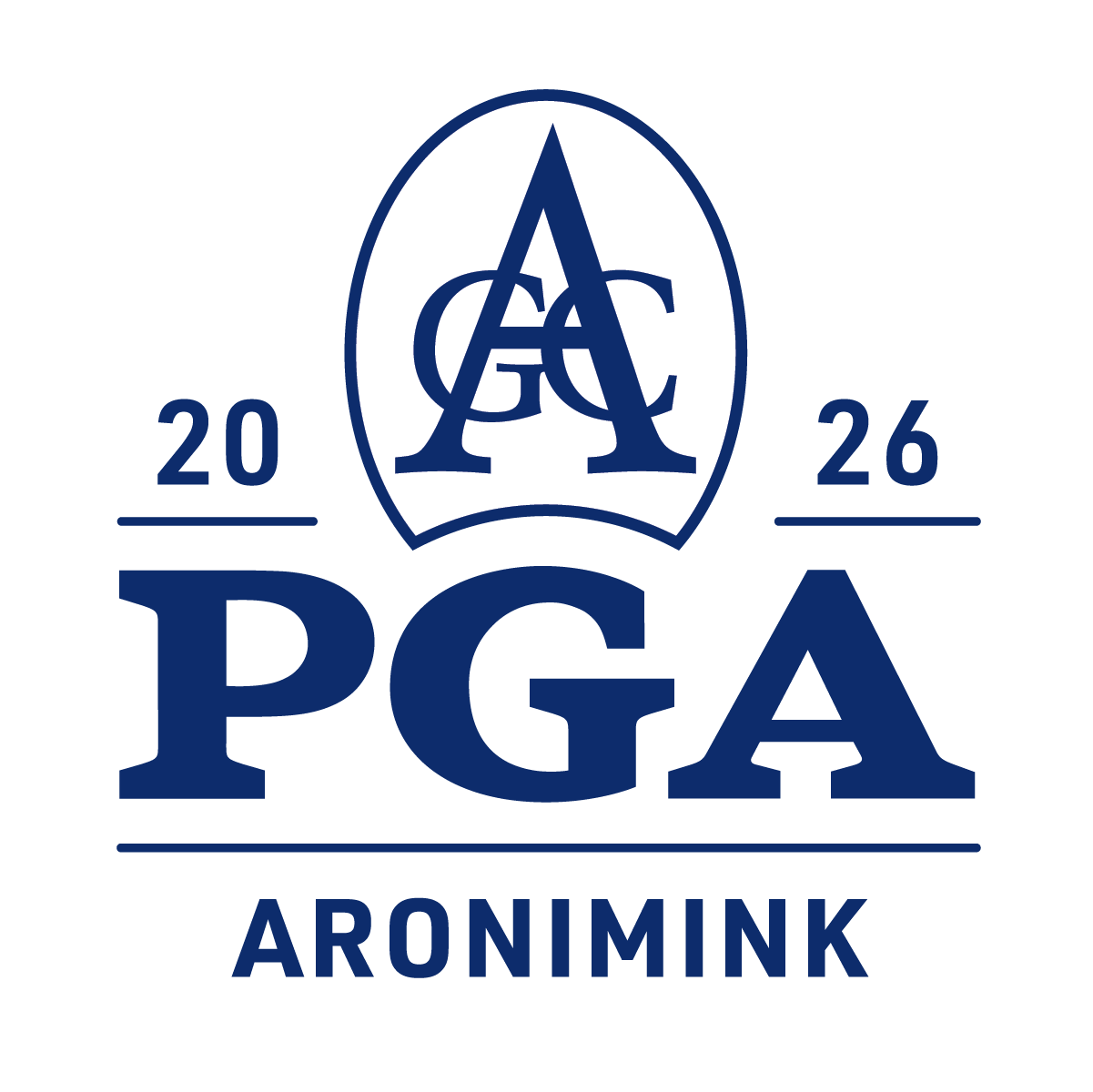

Tournament information
- Dates: May 14–17, 2026
- Location: Newtown Square, Pennsylvania, U.S. 40°0′38″N 75°24′32″W
- Course: Aronimink Golf Club
- Tours: PGA Tour; European Tour; Japan Golf Tour

Statistics
- Par: 70
- Length: 7,394 yd (6,761 m)
- Field: 156 players, 82 after cut
- Cut: 144 (+4)
- Prize fund: $20,500,000
- Winner's share: $3,690,000

Champion
- (England) Aaron Rai
- 271 (−9)
- Location in the United States Location in Pennsylvania

The 2026 PGA Championship was the 108th edition of the PGA Championship, the second of the four men's major golf championships held in 2026. The tournament took place on May 14–17 at Aronimink Golf Club in Newtown Square, Pennsylvania, a suburb west of Philadelphia.

Aaron Rai won the golf tournament and his first career major championship, winning by three strokes over runners-up Jon Rahm and Alex Smalley. Rai became the second player of Indian heritage to win a men's major championship, after Vijay Singh, and the first from England to win the PGA Championship since Jim Barnes, who won the first two editions in 1916 and 1919. Rai became only the eighth player to win a major with a lower score in each round.

== Venue ==
This is the second time the PGA Championship was played at Aronimink, which also hosted in 1962. The club has also hosted other prominent golf championships including the 1977 U.S. Amateur, the 2020 Women's PGA Championship, the 2003 Senior PGA Championship, the 2010 and 2011 AT&T National and the 2018 BMW Championship.

=== Course yardage ===
Hole	Yards	Par	Hole	Yards	Par
1	434	4	10	472	4
2	413	4	11	425	4
3	455	4	12	466	4
4	457	4	13	385	4
5	171	3	14	216	3
6	402	4	15	546	4
7	431	4	16	555	5
8	242	3	17	229	3
9	605	5	18	490	4
Out	3,610	35	In	3,784	35
Source:		Total		7,394	70

Previous course lengths for major championships

- 7,045 yards (6,442 m) – par 70, 1962 PGA Championship

== Round summaries ==
=== First round ===
Thursday, May 14, 2026

Seven players posted first rounds of 67, three under par, to share the lead at the end of the first day: Scottie Scheffler, Min Woo Lee, Martin Kaymer, Alex Smalley, Aldrich Potgieter, Stephan Jäger and Ryo Hisatsune. The seven-way tie was the most shared leaders at the PGA Championship since 1969, which had nine leaders at the same stage. Among all major championships, it was the most shared leaders since another seven-way tie after the first round of the 1977 U.S. Open.

Scheffler, the defending champion and world number one, made five birdies and two bogies; this was the first time in his career that he (jointly) led a major championship after the first round. Martin Kaymer qualified as the 2010 champion, but had not won a professional tournament since the 2014 U.S. Open and was ranked 1,160th in the Official World Golf Ranking. He finished the day as a joint leader, having missed an eagle putt on his final hole of the day (the par-5 9th) which would have given him the outright lead.

Patrick Reed was the only player in the field to complete the round without recording a bogey, scoring 68, two under par. A large group of players including major champions Jon Rahm, Jordan Spieth, Brooks Koepka, Jason Day and Cameron Smith opened with rounds of 69, one under par. Following an errant shot on the seventh hole, Rahm struck the turf in anger, causing a divot to hit a nearby volunteer in the face. Rahm apologized and said in a press conference afterwards that the incident was "inexcusable".

Garrick Higgo made four birdies and one bogey in his round, but was assessed a two-stroke penalty on the first hole because he arrived late for his tee time; he finished with 69, one under par. He said afterwards: "I wouldn't have been late if I knew I was running late." Masters champion Rory McIlroy struggled throughout the opening round and closed with four consecutive bogeys, finishing with a score of 74, four over par. Bryson DeChambeau scored 76, six over par. Both players were left outside the top 100 after 18 holes.

Scoring conditions were difficult throughout the day due to strong wind gusts and demanding hole locations. The average score was 72.26 and there were 63.2% greens in regulation, compared to 77.4% when Aronimink hosted the 2018 BMW Championship.

Place	Player	Score	To par
T1	(Japan) Ryo Hisatsune	67	−3
T1	(Germany) Stephan Jäger	67	−3
T1	(Germany) Martin Kaymer	67	−3
T1	(Australia) Min Woo Lee	67	−3
T1	(South Africa) Aldrich Potgieter	67	−3
T1	(United States) Scottie Scheffler	67	−3
T1	(United States) Alex Smalley	67	−3
T8	(England) Dan Brown	68	−2
T8	(Canada) Corey Conners	68	−2
T8	(United States) Max Greyserman	68	−2
T8	(Republic of Ireland) Shane Lowry	68	−2
T8	(United States) Patrick Reed	68	−2
T8	(United States) Xander Schauffele	68	−2
T8	(United States) Sahith Theegala	68	−2

=== Second round ===
Friday, May 15, 2026

Conditions remained difficult during the second round, with cold weather and strong winds; several players criticized the severity of the hole locations. Alex Smalley retained a share of the lead after a round of 69, leaving him on 136 (four under par). Maverick McNealy shared the lead with Smalley after a round of 67, which included an eagle on the par-5 16th hole.

A group of six players—Hideki Matsuyama, Chris Gotterup, Max Greyserman and first-round co-leaders Aldrich Potgieter, Stephan Jäger and Min Woo Lee—were one shot behind on 137 (three under par). Gotterup surged into contention with the lowest round of they day, a 65 (five under par for the day) which finished with three consecutive birdies. At one point Potgieter had an outright lead, at 5-under par, before late bogeys on holes 17 and 18 dropped him to tied third position. Defending champion Scottie Scheffler had three bogeys in his first four holes, finishing with a round of 71 (+1) which left him tied for ninth at 138 (−2), alongside Xander Schauffele, Harris English, Cameron Young, David Puig, Justin Thomas, Kim Si-woo and Ludvig Åberg. Rory McIlroy improved in his second round, a bogey-free 67 (−3).

The cut was at 144 (+4). Among the players eliminated by the cut were 2025 PGA Championship runner-up Bryson DeChambeau, and three of the top ten in the world rankings: Tommy Fleetwood (6), J.J. Spaun (8) and Russell Henley (9). Justin Rose survived the cut by a single stroke, by sinking a 25 yards (23 m) eagle chip on his final hole of the day. Ben Kern was the only PGA Professional to make the cut after making six birdies in the second round.

Place	Player	Score	To par
T1	(United States) Maverick McNealy	69-67=136	−4
T1	(United States) Alex Smalley	67-69=136	−4
T3	(United States) Chris Gotterup	72-65=137	−3
T3	(United States) Max Greyserman	68-69=137	−3
T3	(Germany) Stephan Jäger	67-70=137	−3
T3	(Australia) Min Woo Lee	67-70=137	−3
T3	(Japan) Hideki Matsuyama	70-67=137	−3
T3	(South Africa) Aldrich Potgieter	67-70=137	−3
T9	(Sweden) Ludvig Åberg	72-66=138	−2
T9	(United States) Harris English	71-67=138	−2
T9	(South Korea) Kim Si-woo	71-67=138	−2
T9	(Spain) David Puig	71-67=138	−2
T9	(United States) Scottie Scheffler	67-71=138	−2
T9	(United States) Justin Thomas	69-69=138	−2
T9	(United States) Cameron Young	71-67=138	−2

=== Third round ===
Saturday, May 16, 2026

Shifting winds and more accessible hole locations led to substantially lower scoring during moving day, particularly for those with early tee times. Alex Smalley emerged with the outright lead after carding a third-round 68 (−2) to reach 204 (−6). Beginning the day tied for the lead, he recovered from three early bogies with seven birdies over his final 12 holes, including at the par-4 15th, which was the longest par-4 in major championship history at 551 yards (504 m). The 29-year-old American, seeking his first professional victory, took a two-shot advantage into the final round.

A group of five players, Jon Rahm, Ludvig Åberg, Aaron Rai, Matti Schmid and Nick Taylor, were tied for second at 208 (−4). Rahm held the outright lead at 5-under before three-putting the par-4 18th hole to make bogey. Rai also briefly had the lead alone at 5-under before bogeying the 18th.

Masters champion Rory McIlroy continued his recovery from an opening-round 74 by shooting a 66 (−4), one of the lowest rounds of the day, to move within three shots of the lead. He birdied four of his first seven holes and later said he had regained confidence with his driver after struggling earlier in the championship. McIlroy was tied at 3-under alongside Xander Schauffele, Patrick Reed and Maverick McNealy.

World number one Scottie Scheffler struggled to gain momentum on the greens throughout the round and posted a 71 (+1), leaving him five shots behind the lead. Scheffler later described the tournament as "anybody's championship" given the congested leaderboard. In total, 22 players finished within four shots of the lead, which was the most after 54 holes at a major since 27 players were within four of the lead at the 2001 Open Championship. The low round of the day was a 65 (−5), and was shared by Justin Rose, Chris Kirk, Matti Schmid, Nick Taylor and Kristoffer Reitan.

Place	Player	Score	To par
1	(United States) Alex Smalley	67-69-68=204	−6
T2	(Sweden) Ludvig Åberg	72-66-68=206	−4
T2	(Spain) Jon Rahm	69-70-67=206	−4
T2	(England) Aaron Rai	70-69-67=206	−4
T2	(Germany) Matti Schmid	69-72-65=206	−4
T2	(Canada) Nick Taylor	69-72-65=206	−4
T7	(Northern Ireland) Rory McIlroy	74-67-66=207	−3
T7	(United States) Maverick McNealy	69-67-71=207	−3
T7	(United States) Patrick Reed	68-72-67=207	−3
T7	(United States) Xander Schauffele	68-73-66=207	−3

=== Final round ===
Sunday, May 17, 2026

==== Summary ====
Aaron Rai shot a final-round 65 (−5) to win the 108th PGA Championship by three strokes over Jon Rahm and Alex Smalley, earning his first major championship title and becoming the first English winner of the PGA Championship since Jim Barnes in 1919.

Third-round leader Smalley began with a two-shot advantage and kept a steady pace early with five straight pars, before a double bogey on the 6th hole. Rahm birdied his two opening holes to seize the lead, but bogeyed the 3rd and 7th holes to fall backwards. Rai birdied the 1st before bogeying three of his next seven holes to fall to 3-under. At the par-5 9th hole, he holed a 40-foot (12 m) eagle putt to move to 5-under for the tournament.

Matti Schmid, playing in the final pairing with Smalley, bogeyed the 1st hole but rebounded with three birdies to hold the outright lead at 6-under headed to back nine. Cameron Smith was in contention a few groups ahead at 5-under, before a three-putt bogey at the 17th hole ended his challenge.

Masters champion Rory McIlroy birdied the 2nd hole to get to 4-under, but did not surpass that mark for the remainder of the round as he struggled to hit fairways off the tee. Defending champion Scottie Scheffler shot a final-round 69 (−1) to finish tied for 14th, while McIlroy finished tied for seventh alongside Smith and Xander Schauffele.

Rai birdied the 11th and 13th holes to take the lead at 7-under. After adding another birdie at the par-5 16th, Rai holed a 68-foot (21 m) birdie putt at the par-3 17th hole to extend his lead and effectively secure the championship. He safely reached the green in regulation and two-putted for par on the 18th hole to finish at 9-under for the tournament.

Rahm birdied both the par-5 9th and 16th holes to close with a 68 (−2) and finish in second place at 6-under-par. Smalley joined him after birdieing the last, while Schmid struggled on the back nine and finished tied fourth with Ludvig Åberg and Justin Thomas. Thomas posted the clubhouse lead earlier in the day after shooting a 65 (−5). Beginning the day 10 strokes off the lead, Kurt Kitayama carded a bogey-free 63 (−7) to tie the record for the lowest final round in major championship history and climb into the top 10.

==== Final leaderboard ====
Champion
Crystal Bowl winner (leading PGA Club Pro)
(c) = past champion

Top 10
Place	Player	Score	To par	Money (US$)
1	(England) Aaron Rai	70-69-67-65=271	−9	3,690,000
T2	(Spain) Jon Rahm	69-70-67-68=274	−6	1,804,000
T2	(United States) Alex Smalley	67-69-68-70=274	−6	1,804,000
T4	(Sweden) Ludvig Åberg	72-66-68-69=275	−5	843,866
T4	(Germany) Matti Schmid	69-72-65-69=275	−5	843,866
T4	(United States) Justin Thomas (c)	69-69-72-65=275	−5	843,866
T7	(Northern Ireland) Rory McIlroy (c)	74-67-66-69=276	−4	637,050
T7	(United States) Xander Schauffele (c)	68-73-66-69=276	−4	637,050
T7	(Australia) Cameron Smith	69-71-68-68=276	−4	637,050
T10	(United States) Chris Gotterup	72-65-71-69=277	−3	496,707
T10	(United States) Kurt Kitayama	70-69-75-63=277	−3	496,707
T10	(United States) Patrick Reed	68-72-67-70=277	−3	496,707
T10	(England) Justin Rose	70-73-65-69=277	−3	496,707

Leaderboard below the top 10
Place	Player	Score	To par	Money ($)
T14	(England) Matt Fitzpatrick	70-72-71-65=278	−2	364,762
T14	(United States) Max Greyserman	68-69-71-70=278	−2	364,762
T14	(United States) Ben Griffin	71-70-67-70=278	−2	364,762
T14	(United States) Scottie Scheffler (c)	67-71-71-69=278	−2	364,762
T18	(United States) Harris English	71-67-71-70-279	−1	229,128
T18	(Republic of Ireland) Pádraig Harrington (c)	74-69-67-69=279	−1	229,128
T18	(Germany) Stephan Jäger	67-70-73-69=279	−1	229,128
T18	(Australia) Min Woo Lee	67-70-71-71=279	−1	229,128
T18	(United States) Maverick McNealy	69-67-71-72=279	−1	229,128
T18	(Chile) Joaquín Niemann	69-73-66-71=279	−1	229,128
T18	(Spain) David Puig	71-67-71-70=279	−1	229,128
T18	(United States) Jordan Spieth	69-72-70-68=279	−1	229,128
T26	(United States) Sam Burns	70-72-67-71=280	E	125,523
T26	(United States) Bud Cauley	69-72-67-72=280	E	125,523
T26	(New Zealand) Daniel Hillier	71-69-70-70=280	E	125,523
T26	(United States) Tom Hoge	72-70-68-70=280	E	125,523
T26	(Japan) Hideki Matsuyama	70-67-71-72=280	E	125,523
T26	(Sweden) Alex Norén	71-73-70-66=280	E	125,523
T26	(United States) Andrew Novak	69-70-71-70=280	E	125,523
T26	(Canada) Nick Taylor	69-72-65-74=280	E	125,523
T26	(United States) Cameron Young	71-67-72-70=280	E	125,523
T35	(United States) Daniel Berger	74-70-69-68=281	+1	78,805
T35	(South Africa) Christiaan Bezuidenhout	72-72-70-67=281	+1	78,805
T35	(United States) Patrick Cantlay	70-69-74-68=281	+1	78,805
T35	(New Zealand) Ryan Fox	70-70-72-69=281	+1	78,805
T35	(Japan) Ryo Hisatsune	67-73-73-68=281	+1	78,805
T35	(Germany) Martin Kaymer (c)	67-75-66-73=281	+1	78,805
T35	(South Korea) Kim Si-woo	71-67-72-71=281	+1	78,805
T35	(China) Li Haotong	71-69-71-70=281	+1	78,805
T35	(South Africa) Aldrich Potgieter	67-70-73-71=281	+1	78,805
T44	(United States) Chandler Blanchet	69-73-70-70=282	+2	50,348
T44	(Denmark) Nicolai Højgaard	69-75-66-72=282	+2	50,348
T44	(United States) Dustin Johnson	72-70-68-72=282	+2	50,348
T44	(United States) Michael Kim	73-70-67-72=282	+2	50,348
T44	(United States) Chris Kirk	73-70-65-74=282	+2	50,348
T44	(Republic of Ireland) Shane Lowry	68-76-70-68=282	+2	50,348
T44	(United States) Denny McCarthy	71-71-70-70=282	+2	50,348
T44	(Canada) Taylor Pendrith	72-72-67-71=282	+2	50,348
T44	(Norway) Kristoffer Reitan	71-72-65-74=282	+2	50,348
T44	(Venezuela) Jhonattan Vegas	73-71-69-69=282	+2	50,348
T44	(England) Matt Wallace	71-71-72-68=282	+2	50,348
T55	(Canada) Corey Conners	68-73-72-70=283	+3	34,186
T55	(United States) Brooks Koepka (c)	69-72-68-74=283	+3	34,186
T55	(Sweden) Mikael Lindberg	71-71-67-74=283	+3	34,186
T55	(United States) Collin Morikawa (c)	69-72-74-68=283	+3	34,186
T55	(United States) Andrew Putnam	69-71-70-73=283	+3	34,186
T60	(United States) Rickie Fowler	70-71-68-75=284	+4	29,218
T60	(United States) Brian Harman	70-73-66-75=284	+4	29,218
T60	(Philippines) Rico Hoey	70-70-71-73=284	+4	29,218
T60	(United States) Sahith Theegala	68-73-72-71=284	+4	29,218
T60	(Finland) Sami Välimäki	73-70-71-70=284	+4	29,218
T65	(Australia) Jason Day (c)	69-70-75-72=286	+6	26,900
T65	(Denmark) Rasmus Højgaard	72-71-71-72=286	+6	26,900
T65	(South Africa) Casey Jarvis	70-72-78-66=286	+6	26,900
T65	(United States) Keith Mitchell	73-69-71-73=286	+6	26,900
T65	(United States) Sam Stevens	69-73-71-73=286	+6	26,900
T70	(England) Luke Donald	71-73-74-69=287	+7	25,070
T70	(United States) Ryan Gerard	69-72-73-73=287	+7	25,070
T70	(Japan) Kazuki Higa	71-71-70-75=287	+7	25,070
T70	(United States) William Mouw	74-70-70-73=287	+7	25,070
T70	(England) John Parry	73-71-70-73=287	+7	25,070
T75	(England) Dan Brown	68-75-70-75=288	+8	24,192
T75	(England) Alex Fitzpatrick	72-70-72-74=288	+8	24,192
T75	(Denmark) Rasmus Neergaard-Petersen	72-72-71-73=288	+8	24,192
T75	(Australia) Elvis Smylie	72-72-73-71=288	+8	24,192
79	(United States) Johnny Keefer	72-72-69-76=289	+9	23,970
80	(United States) Ben Kern	74-67-77-72=290	+10	23,930
81	(United States) Michael Brennan	72-72-69-78=291	+11	23,910
82	(United States) Brian Campbell	72-72-82-72=298	+18	23,900
CUT	(United States) Akshay Bhatia	71-74=145	+5	$4,300 (Note: The PGA of America gave a stipend of $4,300 to anyone who missed the cut. This does not count toward official earnings on any tour.)
CUT	(United States) Michael Block	70-75=145	+5	$4,300
CUT	(United States) Wyndham Clark	75-70=145	+5	$4,300
CUT	(Belgium) Thomas Detry	72-73=145	+5	$4,300
CUT	(England) Tommy Fleetwood	72-73=145	+5	$4,300
CUT	(United States) Russell Henley	72-73=145	+5	$4,300
CUT	(South Africa) Garrick Higgo	69-76=145	+5	$4,300
CUT	(South Korea) Im Sung-jae	73-72=145	+5	$4,300
CUT	(Japan) Kota Kaneko	73-72=145	+5	$4,300
CUT	(Scotland) Robert MacIntyre	70-75=145	+5	$4,300
CUT	(United States) J. T. Poston	71-74=145	+5	$4,300
CUT	(England) Andy Sullivan	72-73=145	+5	$4,300
CUT	(United States) Jimmy Walker (c)	71-74=145	+5	$4,300
CUT	(Spain) Ángel Ayora	72-74=146	+6	$4,300
CUT	(United States) Keegan Bradley (c)	74-72=146	+6	$4,300
CUT	(United States) Stewart Cink	74-72=146	+6	$4,300
CUT	(United States) Tyler Collet	75-71=146	+6	$4,300
CUT	(United States) Pierceson Coody	71-75=146	+6	$4,300
CUT	(United States) Jordan Gumberg	73-73=146	+6	$4,300
CUT	(England) Tyrrell Hatton	72-74=146	+6	$4,300
CUT	(Norway) Viktor Hovland	74-72=146	+6	$4,300
CUT	(United States) David Lipsky	74-72=146	+6	$4,300
CUT	(United States) Max McGreevy	76-70=146	+6	$4,300
CUT	(United States) Ben Polland	73-73=146	+6	$4,300
CUT	(United States) Adam Schenk	75-71=146	+6	$4,300
CUT	(United States) Brandt Snedeker	72-74=146	+6	$4,300
CUT	(United States) J. J. Spaun	70-76=146	+6	$4,300
CUT	(Austria) Sepp Straka	73-73=146	+6	$4,300
CUT	(United States) Gary Woodland	72-74=146	+6	$4,300
CUT	(United States) Ricky Castillo	74-73=147	+7	$4,300
CUT	(United States) Bryson DeChambeau	76-71=147	+7	$4,300
CUT	(England) Harry Hall	72-75=147	+7	$4,300
CUT	(Northern Ireland) Tom McKibbin	74-73=147	+7	$4,300
CUT	(United States) Patrick Rodgers	77-70=147	+7	$4,300
CUT	(United States) Austin Smotherman	72-75=147	+7	$4,300
CUT	(Australia) Travis Smyth	74-73=147	+7	$4,300
CUT	(United States) Jacob Bridgeman	74-74=148	+8	$4,300
CUT	(United States) Jason Dufner (c)	75-73=148	+8	$4,300
CUT	(United States) Steven Fisk	76-72=148	+8	$4,300
CUT	(Argentina) Emiliano Grillo	76-72=148	+8	$4,300
CUT	(United States) Joe Highsmith	73-75=148	+8	$4,300
CUT	(United States) Billy Horschel	74-74=148	+8	$4,300
CUT	(Australia) Adam Scott	72-76=148	+8	$4,300
CUT	(Austria) Bernd Wiesberger	72-76=148	+8	$4,300
CUT	(United States) Lucas Glover	76-73=149	+9	$4,300
CUT	(United States) Garrett Sapp	75-74=149	+9	$4,300
CUT	(South Korea) Yang Yong-eun (c)	72-77=149	+9	$4,300
CUT	(Colombia) Nico Echavarría	75-75=150	+10	$4,300
CUT	(United States) Shaun Micheel (c)	77-73=150	+10	$4,300
CUT	(South Africa) Jayden Schaper	75-75=150	+10	$4,300
CUT	(Canada) Sudarshan Yellamaraju	75-75=150	+10	$4,300
CUT	(United States) Matt McCarty	77-74=151	+11	$4,300
CUT	(United States) Paul McClure	75-76=151	+11	$4,300
CUT	(United States) Davis Riley	78-73=151	+11	$4,300
CUT	(United States) Michael Thorbjornsen	75-77=151	+11	$4,300
CUT	(United States) Ian Holt	74-78=152	+12	$4,300
CUT	(United States) Max Homa	75-77=152	+12	$4,300
CUT	(England) Marco Penge	75-77=152	+12	$4,300
CUT	(France) Adrien Saddier	75-77=152	+12	$4,300
CUT	(England) Jordan Smith	75-77=152	+12	$4,300
CUT	(United States) Chris Gabriele	77-77=154	+14	$4,300
CUT	(United States) Zach Haynes	76-78=154	+14	$4,300
CUT	(United States) Jared Jones	80-74=154	+14	$4,300
CUT	(Argentina) Francisco Bidé	76-79=155	+15	$4,300
CUT	(United States) Austin Hurt	79-76=155	+15	$4,300
CUT	(United States) Ryan Lenahan	75-80=155	+15	$4,300
CUT	(United States) Timothy Wiseman	75-80=155	+15	$4,300
CUT	(United States) Derek Berg	78-78=156	+16	$4,300
CUT	(United States) Braden Shattuck	81-75=156	+16	$4,300
CUT	(United States) Ryan Vermeer	77-80=157	+17	$4,300
CUT	(United States) Jesse Droemer	77-81=158	+18	$4,300
CUT	(United States) Michael Kartrude	79-79=158	+18	$4,300
CUT	(England) Mark Geddes	81-80=162	+21	$4,300
CUT	(United States) Bryce Fisher	79-83=162	+22	$4,300

==== Scorecard ====
Hole	1	2	3	4	5	6	7	8	9	10	11	12	13	14	15	16	17	18
Par	4	4	4	4	3	4	4	3	5	4	4	4	4	3	4	5	3	4
(England) Rai	−5	−5	−4	−5	−5	−4	−4	−3	−5	−5	−6	−6	−7	−7	−7	−8	−9	−9
(Spain) Rahm	−5	−6	−5	−5	−5	−5	−4	−4	−5	−5	−5	−5	−5	−5	−5	−6	−6	−6
(United States) Smalley	−6	−6	−6	−6	−6	−4	−4	−3	−4	−4	−4	−4	−4	−4	−4	−6	−5	−6
(United States) Thomas	E	E	+1	+1	E	E	−1	−1	−2	−2	−3	−3	−3	−3	−4	−5	−5	−5
(Sweden) Åberg	−4	−5	−5	−5	−5	−5	−4	−3	−4	−3	−3	−3	−4	−3	−3	−4	−4	−5
(Germany) Schmid	−3	−4	−4	−5	−5	−6	−6	−6	−6	−5	−5	−5	−6	−6	−5	−5	−5	−5
(Australia) Smith	−2	−3	−3	−4	−4	−4	−4	−4	−5	−5	−5	−5	−5	−5	−5	−5	−4	−4
(Northern Ireland) McIlroy	−3	−4	−4	−4	−4	−4	−4	−4	−4	−4	−4	−4	−3	−4	−4	−4	−4	−4
(United States) Schauffele	−3	−3	−3	−3	−3	−3	−3	−3	−4	−4	−3	−3	−2	−2	−2	−3	−3	−4
(United States) Kitayama	+3	+2	+1	+1	+1	E	E	E	−1	−1	−1	−1	−2	−2	−2	−2	−3	−3
(United States) Reed	−3	−3	−2	−2	−1	−2	−1	−1	−2	−2	−2	−2	−2	−3	−3	−4	−3	−3
(United States) McNealy	−4	−4	−3	−2	−2	−2	−2	E	−1	−1	−1	−1	−2	−2	−2	−2	−2	−1
(Canada) Taylor	−4	−4	−4	−4	−5	−5	−5	−5	−5	−4	−4	−4	−3	−2	−1	−2	−1	E

Cumulative tournament scores, relative to par

Eagle	Birdie	Bogey	Double bogey
