= Alex Smalley =

American professional golfer (born 1996)

Personal information
- Full name: Alex Anthony Smalley
- Nickname: Biggie Smalls
- Nationality: United States
- Born: October 21, 1996 (age 30) Rochester, New York, U.S.
- Height: 6 ft 0 in (1.83 m)
- Weight: 160 lb (73 kg; 11 st)

Career
- Sport: Golf
- College: Duke University
- Turned professional: 2019
- Current tour: PGA Tour
- Former tours: PGA Tour Canada; LocaliQ Series
- Highest ranking: 41 (May 24, 2026) (as of October 25, 2026)

Best results in major championships
- Masters Tournament: DNP
- PGA Championship: T2: 2026
- U.S. Open: CUT: 2017, 2026
- The Open Championship: T53: 2026

Alex Anthony Smalley (born October 21, 1996) is an American professional golfer who plays on the PGA Tour.

== Early life and amateur career ==
Smalley was born in Rochester, New York, on October 21, 1996, to Maria and Terry Smalley. He has one sibling, a sister named Katie. His father was from Coshocton, Ohio, and his mother was from Wheeling, West Virginia; they met while attending West Liberty University. Both of Smalley's parents hold PhDs in chemistry.

Smalley grew up in Wake Forest, North Carolina, where he attended Wake Forest High School. He was enrolled in four AP courses and graduated with a 4.71 GPA. As a golfer, Smalley won the 2014 North Carolina Junior Boys Championship and was 36th in the Golfweek/Sagarin rankings of the 2015 recruiting class. He committed to play golf for the Duke Blue Devils at Duke University, where his mother had previously earned a PhD.

As a freshman at Duke, Smalley shot 68-66 to win the Princeton Invitational in April 2016. In his debut at the U.S. Amateur in August 2016, he shot 7-under 133 at Oakland Hills Country Club to claim medalist honors, before being eliminated in the match play round of 32 by Dylan Meyer. During his sophomore summer, Smalley shot 7-under in a 36-hole qualifier to make his first start in a major championship at the 2017 U.S. Open, where he missed the cut. At the 2018 NCAA Division I men's golf championship, Smalley defeated future world number one Scottie Scheffler, 5 and 4, as part of the Duke–Texas quarterfinal match.

Smalley had a stroke average of 70.35 during his senior season, which was the lowest single-season average in Duke program history. In October 2018, he won the Louisville Cardinal Challenge with rounds of 61-66-70 and moved to 32nd in the World Amateur Golf Ranking. Smalley was named ACC Scholar Athlete of the Year in 2019 and was selected as a second-team All-American. He graduated in May 2019 with a degree in environmental science. Smalley's career stroke average of 71.32 broke the previous Duke record of 72.14 set by Ryan Blaum.

In June 2019, Smalley won the Sunnehanna Amateur for a second consecutive year, the first to do since Rickie Fowler (2007, 2008). He was selected to represent the United States at the 2019 Walker Cup in September, where he helped the United States to defeat Great Britain & Ireland at Royal Liverpool Golf Club. Smalley was the second Duke Blue Devil to play in a Walker Cup, after Dick Siderowf.

== Professional career ==
Smalley turned professional in 2019. He played the LocaliQ Series in 2020 and PGA Tour Canada in 2021. During the 2020–21 PGA Tour season, he played in four events and earned enough points to qualify for the Korn Ferry Tour Finals, in which he earned a 2021–22 PGA Tour card.

As a rookie on the PGA Tour, Smalley finished runner-up at the Corales Puntacana Championship in March 2022, one stroke behind Chad Ramey. He also finished runner-up at the John Deere Classic in July 2023, two shots behind Sepp Straka.

Smalley was in third place after 54 holes of the 2025 Players Championship, three shots behind the lead. He shot a final-round 76 to finish tied-14th. In April 2026, Smalley and Hayden Springer combined to shoot a best-ball 58 in the first round of the Zurich Classic, a team event on the PGA Tour. They ultimately finished tied-second, one stroke behind the team of Alex Fitzpatrick and Matt Fitzpatrick.

At the 2026 PGA Championship, Smalley shot rounds of 67-69-68 to hold a two-stroke lead after three rounds. This was Smalley's first 54-hole lead in any tournament sanctioned by the Official World Golf Ranking. He carded a final-round 70 to finish runner-up alongside Jon Rahm at 6-under, three strokes behind the winner Aaron Rai.

== Amateur wins ==
- 2014 North Carolina Junior Boys Championship
- 2016 Princeton Invitational
- 2018 Sunnehanna Amateur, Louisville Cardinal Challenge
- 2019 Sunnehanna Amateur

== Results in major championships ==
Tournament	2017	2018
Masters Tournament		
U.S. Open	CUT	
The Open Championship		
PGA Championship		

Tournament	2019	2020	2021	2022	2023	2024	2025	2026
Masters Tournament								
PGA Championship					T23	CUT	T28	T2
U.S. Open								CUT
The Open Championship		NT						T53

Top 10
Did not play

CUT = missed the halfway cut
"T" indicates a tie for a place
NT = no tournament due to COVID-19 pandemic

== Results in The Players Championship ==
Tournament	2023	2024	2025	2026
The Players Championship	T65	CUT	T14	T24

CUT = missed the halfway cut
"T" indicates a tie for a place

== U.S. national team appearances ==
Amateur

- Arnold Palmer Cup: 2019
- Walker Cup: 2019 (winners)

== See also ==
- 2021 Korn Ferry Tour Finals graduates
