= Aaron Rai =

English professional golfer (born 1995)

Personal information
- Nationality: England
- Born: 3 March 1995 (age 31) Wolverhampton, England
- Height: 5 ft 11 in (1.80 m)
- Weight: 168 lb (76 kg; 12.0 st)

Career
- Sport: Golf
- Turned professional: 2012
- Current tours: PGA Tour; European Tour
- Former tours: Challenge Tour; PGA EuroPro Tour
- Professional wins: 9
- Highest ranking: 13 (31 May 2026) (as of 25 October 2026)

Number of wins by tour
- PGA Tour: 2
- European Tour: 4
- Asian Tour: 1
- Challenge Tour: 3
- Other: 1

Best results in major championships (wins: 1)
- Masters Tournament: T27: 2025
- PGA Championship: Won: 2026
- U.S. Open: T11: 2026
- The Open Championship: T19: 2021

Aaron Rai (born 3 March 1995) is an English professional golfer who plays on the PGA Tour and the European Tour. He has won one major championship, the 2026 PGA Championship.

Rai achieved a three-win promotion on the Challenge Tour in 2017 and gained his first win on the European Tour in 2018. He earned PGA Tour status through the 2021 Korn Ferry Tour Finals and began to compete primarily in the United States. Rai won his first PGA Tour title in 2024 at the Wyndham Championship.

== Early life ==
Aaron Rai was born in Wolverhampton, England, on 3 March 1995. His parents, Amrik Singh and Dalvir Shukla, are of Indian descent. His father was born in England to immigrants from India, and his mother emigrated to England from Kenya as a teenager. His father worked as a community worker and was an amateur tennis player; his mother had several jobs, including as a mental-health nurse and an aerobics instructor. Rai grew up with three older siblings—two sisters and one brother— and attended Wolverhampton Grammar School for his secondary education.

Rai was introduced to golf at age four after accidentally being struck by his brother's hockey stick, prompting his mother to buy him safe plastic golf clubs as an alternative. His early childhood hobbies included a passion for Formula 1 racing, frequently wearing Ferrari apparel to junior golf competitions before fully committing to golf. He practiced his early schooling and golf game at the Three Hammers Golf Complex from age four and joined Patshull Park at age five.

== Professional career ==
Rai turned professional in 2012. In 2014 and 2015 he played on the PGA EuroPro Tour. He won the 2015 Glenfarclas Open after a playoff, finished 5th in the Order of Merit and was promoted to the Challenge Tour for 2016.

Rai was 18th in the 2016 Challenge Tour Order of Merit and just missed out on a European Tour place. His best finish was joint runner-up in the Le Vaudreuil Golf Challenge, a stroke behind the winner, Alexander Björk.

In 2017, Rai got three wins on the Challenge Tour. In March he won the Barclays Kenya Open by 3 strokes. His Kenya-born mother embraced him on the final green, seconds after his final stroke: Rai said that it was her first visit to Kenya since she left in 1970. He had his second win in May, the Andalucía Costa del Sol Match Play 9, defeating Irishman Gavin Moynihan 2&1 in the 9-hole final. Rai's third success came in July in the Le Vaudreuil Golf Challenge where he won by 5 strokes. The third win gave him an immediate entry to the European Tour. In May, at Walton Heath, he led international section qualifying for the U.S. Open but failed to make the cut in his first major.

In his first season on the European Tour Rai had four top-10 finishes and ended the 2018 season 58th in the Order of Merit. His highest finish was tied for 5th place in the BMW International Open and he was 8th in the Nedbank Golf Challenge in November.

Rai won the 2018 Honma Hong Kong Open, the first event of the 2019 European Tour season. He led by 6 strokes after three rounds but was pushed hard by Matt Fitzpatrick, who finished with a final round of 64. Rai's lead had been reduced to one shot after 16 holes but Fitzpatrick bogeyed the 17th and, despite a bogey at the last hole, Rai won by one stroke.

In September 2020, Rai held the 54-hole lead at the Dubai Duty Free Irish Open, but was unable to convert this into a victory as John Catlin overtook him by two shots; ultimately finishing runner-up. A week later, Rai defeated Tommy Fleetwood in a playoff to win the Aberdeen Standard Investments Scottish Open, a result that lifted him into the world top 100 for the first time.

In August 2021, Rai entered the Albertsons Boise Open as part of the Korn Ferry Tour Finals, as a way of obtaining a PGA Tour card for the 2021–22 season. He held a one-shot lead on the final hole of the tournament, however a closing double-bogey saw him drop to a tie for second-place, one shot behind Greyson Sigg. The result was still good enough for Rai to secure his card for the following season.

Rai finished 93rd in the FedEx standings in 2022 which secured his playing rights for the following year.

In the third round of the 2023 Players Championship, Rai scored a hole-in-one on TPC Sawgrass's signature 17th island green.

A successful 2024 season saw Rai claim his maiden victory on the PGA Tour at the Wyndham Championship, five other top-10 finishes as well as making 14 cuts in a row. He also qualified for the Tour Championship and was the only golfer in the 30 man field to do so without playing a single signature event.

In November 2025, Rai defeated Tommy Fleetwood in a playoff to win the title at the Abu Dhabi Golf Championship. Rai made a birdie on the first extra hole to seal his win.

He won the Par 3 Contest at the 2026 Masters Tournament.

On 17 May 2026, Rai won the 2026 PGA Championship with a score of 271, 9 shots under par. His final round of 65 included holing a 69-foot putt for a birdie on the 17th green at Aronimink Golf Club. Rai became the first golfer from England to win the PGA Championship since Jim Barnes in 1919. According to ESPN research, Rai was the biggest long-shot to win a major in at least the past 20 years, surpassing Phil Mickelson at the 2021 PGA Championship and Louis Oosthuizen at the 2010 Open Championship, who were both 200–1 to win.

== Personal life ==
Rai lives in Jacksonville, Florida and practices at nearby TPC at Sawgrass.

He is married to Gaurika Bishnoi, a female professional golfer from India.

=== Equipment ===
Rai is noted for several unconventional equipment practices on the golf course. Unlike most golfers, who typically wear a single glove on their non-dominant hand, Rai wears two gloves, a habit he stated began at the age of eight. Rai is also the only player on tour to use iron covers, a practice he attributes to his father's emphasis on caring for equipment and appreciating its value from an early age. Rai is further noted for his use of castle tees and a seven-year-old TaylorMade M6 driver that he used to win the 2026 PGA Championship.

== Professional wins (9) ==
=== PGA Tour wins (2) ===
Legend
Major championships (1)
Other PGA Tour (1)

No.	Date	Tournament	Winning score	Margin of victory	Runner(s)-up
1	11 Aug 2024	Wyndham Championship	−18 (65-65-68-64=262)	2 strokes	(United States) Max Greyserman
2	17 May 2026	PGA Championship	−9 (70-69-67-65=271)	3 strokes	(Spain) Jon Rahm, (United States) Alex Smalley

=== European Tour wins (4) ===
Legend
Major championships (1)
Playoff events (1)
Rolex Series (2) (Note: The Abu Dhabi HSBC Championship is also a Rolex Series tournament.)
Other European Tour (1)

No.	Date	Tournament	Winning score	Margin of victory	Runner(s)-up
1	25 Nov 2018 (2019 season)	Honma Hong Kong Open^{1}	−17 (65-61-68-69=263)	1 stroke	(England) Matt Fitzpatrick
2	4 Oct 2020	Aberdeen Standard Investments Scottish Open	−11 (70-69-70-64=273)	Playoff	(England) Tommy Fleetwood
3	9 Nov 2025	Abu Dhabi HSBC Championship	−25 (64-66-67-66=263)	Playoff	(England) Tommy Fleetwood
4	17 May 2026	PGA Championship	−9 (70-69-67-65=271)	3 strokes	(Spain) Jon Rahm, (United States) Alex Smalley

^{1}Co-sanctioned by the Asian Tour

European Tour playoff record (2–0)

No.	Year	Tournament	Opponent	Result
1	2020	Aberdeen Standard Investments Scottish Open	(England) Tommy Fleetwood	Won with par on first extra hole
2	2025	Abu Dhabi HSBC Championship	(England) Tommy Fleetwood	Won with birdie on first extra hole

=== Challenge Tour wins (3) ===
No.	Date	Tournament	Winning score	Margin of victory	Runner-up
1	26 Mar 2017	Barclays Kenya Open	−17 (67-66-69-65=267)	3 strokes	(France) Adrien Saddier
2	21 May 2017	Andalucía Costa del Sol Match Play 9	2 and 1		(Republic of Ireland) Gavin Moynihan
3	23 Jul 2017	Le Vaudreuil Golf Challenge	−18 (66-65-69-66=266)	5 strokes	(Denmark) Morten Ørum Madsen

=== PGA EuroPro Tour wins (1) ===
No.	Date	Tournament	Winning score	Margin of victory	Runner-up
1	17 Jul 2015	Glenfarclas Open	−8 (64-68-70=202)	Playoff	(England) Craig Hinton

== Major championships ==
=== Wins (1) ===
Year	Championship	54 holes	Winning score	Margin	Runners-up
2026	PGA Championship	2 shot deficit	−9 (70-69-67-65=271)	3 strokes	(Spain) Jon Rahm, (United States) Alex Smalley

=== Results timeline ===
Results not in chronological order in 2020.

Tournament	2017	2018
Masters Tournament		
U.S. Open	CUT	
The Open Championship		
PGA Championship		

Tournament	2019	2020	2021	2022	2023	2024	2025	2026
Masters Tournament							T27	48
PGA Championship			CUT			T39	T19	1
U.S. Open						T19	T33	T11
The Open Championship		NT	T19	CUT		T75	T34	CUT

Win
Top 10
Did not play

CUT = missed the halfway cut
"T" = tied
NT = no tournament due to COVID-19 pandemic

=== Summary ===
Tournament	Wins	2nd	3rd	Top-5	Top-10	Top-25	Events	Cuts made
Masters Tournament	0	0	0	0	0	0	2	2
PGA Championship	1	0	0	1	1	2	4	3
U.S. Open	0	0	0	0	0	2	4	3
The Open Championship	0	0	0	0	0	1	5	3
Totals	1	0	0	1	1	5	15	11

- Most consecutive cuts made – 10 (2024 PGA Championship – 2026 U.S. Open)
- Longest streak of top-10s – 1

== Results in The Players Championship ==
Tournament	2023	2024	2025	2026
The Players Championship	T19	T35	T14	CUT

CUT = missed the halfway cut
"T" = tied

== Results in World Golf Championships ==
Tournament	2019	2020	2021
Championship	T51		T18
Match Play		NT	
Invitational	T12		T26
Champions		NT	NT

Did not play

NT = no tournament due to COVID-19 pandemic
"T" = tied

== Team appearances ==
Professional

- Team Cup (representing Great Britain and Ireland): 2025 (winners)

== See also ==
- 2017 Challenge Tour graduates
- 2021 Korn Ferry Tour Finals graduates
- List of golfers to achieve a three-win promotion from the Challenge Tour
