= Chad Ramey =

American professional golfer (born 1992)

Personal information
- Nationality: United States
- Born: August 3, 1992 (age 34) Fulton, Mississippi, U.S.
- Height: 6 ft 0 in (183 cm)
- Weight: 190 lb (86 kg)
- Spouse: Kelly

Career
- Sport: Golf
- College: Mississippi State University
- Turned professional: 2014
- Current tour: PGA Tour
- Former tours: Korn Ferry Tour; PGA Tour Canada
- Professional wins: 3
- Highest ranking: 100 (November 15, 2026) (as of November 15, 2026)

Number of wins by tour
- PGA Tour: 2
- Korn Ferry Tour: 1

Best results in major championships
- Masters Tournament: DNP
- PGA Championship: CUT: 2022
- U.S. Open: DNP
- The Open Championship: DNP

Chad Ramey (born August 3, 1992) is an American professional golfer who plays on the PGA Tour. He claimed his breakthrough win on the PGA Tour at the Corales Puntacana Championship in 2022.

== Professional career ==
Ramey turned professional in 2014. He played on the PGA Tour Canada in 2017 and finished 16th on the Order of Merit; claiming a card for the 2018 Web.com Tour season.

Ramey claimed his first professional victory in 2021 at the Live and Work in Maine Open. He also recorded 10 other top-10 finishes in the 2020–21 Korn Ferry Tour season en route to finishing fourth on the Korn Ferry Tour points standings, earning a PGA Tour card for the 2021–22 PGA Tour season.

In March 2022, Ramey claimed his first win on the PGA Tour at the Corales Puntacana Championship. He carded a final-round 67 to beat Ben Martin and Alex Smalley by one shot..

In the 2023 season, Ramey was the 18-hole leader in the 2023 Players Championship, shooting a 64 in the first round. He eventually finished the event in a share of 27th place and finished the season 118th in the FedEx Cup Standings..

In April 2024, Ramey and his partner Martin Trainer shot a final round 63 to take the lead of the Zurich Classic of New Orleans. They eventually lost in a playoff against Rory McIlroy and Shane Lowry. He finished the season 116th in the FedEx Cup Standings and secured his card for the following season.

In the 2025 PGA Tour season, Ramey recorded four top-10 finishes included a T-5 at the Valero Texas Open in April as well as a crucial T-2 finish at the World Wide Technology Championship, shooting 27 under par with four rounds in the 60's where he made 31 birdies. This tournament vaulted Ramey from 123rd to 89th in the FedEx cup Standings. He eventually finished the 2025 PGA Tour Season at 93rd in the FedEx Cup standings, securing his PGA Tour card and full status for the 2026 PGA Tour season which only offered 100 PGA Tour cards instead of 125 in previous years.

=== Playing style ===
Ramey is known for his considerably abbreviated follow through in his swing where he keeps his head very steady and does not raise it up even after impact, hence his nickname: Side Eye.

== Professional wins (3) ==
=== PGA Tour wins (2) ===
No.	Date	Tournament	Winning score	Margin of victory	Runner(s)-up
1	Mar 27, 2022	Corales Puntacana Championship	−17 (70-65-69-67=271)	1 stroke	(United States) Ben Martin, (United States) Alex Smalley
2	Nov 16, 2026	Austin Championship	−20 (68-68-67-65=268)	2 strokes	(United States) Ben Kohles

PGA Tour playoff record (0–1)

No.	Year	Tournament	Opponents	Result
1	2024	Zurich Classic of New Orleans (with (France) Martin Trainer)	(Republic of Ireland) Shane Lowry and (Northern Ireland) Rory McIlroy	Lost to par on first extra hole

=== Korn Ferry Tour wins (1) ===
No.	Date	Tournament	Winning score	Margin of victory	Runner-up
1	Jun 27, 2021	Live and Work in Maine Open	−16 (67-65-68-68=268)	1 stroke	(United States) Joshua Creel

Korn Ferry Tour playoff record (0–1)

No.	Year	Tournament	Opponents	Result
1	2020	El Bosque Mexico Championship	(France) Paul Barjon, (United States) David Kocher	Kocher won with birdie on first extra hole

== Results in major championships ==
Tournament	2022
Masters Tournament	
PGA Championship	CUT
U.S. Open	
The Open Championship	

Did not play

CUT = missed the half-way cut

== Results in The Players Championship ==
Tournament	2023	2024	2025	2026
The Players Championship	T27	CUT	CUT	T27

CUT = missed the halfway cut
"T" indicates a tie for a place

== See also ==
- 2021 Korn Ferry Tour Finals graduates
