= Tom Hoge =

American professional golfer (born 1989)

Personal information
- Full name: Thomas Robert Hoge
- Nationality: United States
- Born: May 25, 1989 (age 37) Statesville, North Carolina, U.S.
- Height: 6 ft 1 in (1.85 m)
- Weight: 175 lb (79 kg; 12.5 st)

Career
- Sport: Golf
- College: Texas Christian University
- Turned professional: 2011
- Current tour: PGA Tour
- Former tours: Web.com Tour; Canadian Tour
- Professional wins: 4
- Highest ranking: 24 (March 12, 2023) (as of October 25, 2026)

Number of wins by tour
- PGA Tour: 1
- Other: 3

Best results in major championships
- Masters Tournament: T14: 2025
- PGA Championship: T9: 2022
- U.S. Open: T43: 2019
- The Open Championship: T72: 2024

Thomas Robert Hoge (/ˈhoʊɡiː/; born May 25, 1989) is an American professional golfer on the PGA Tour.

== Amateur career ==
Born in Statesville, North Carolina, Hoge was raised and still resides in Fargo, North Dakota. After graduating from Fargo South High School in 2007, he played college golf at Texas Christian University, where he won two events. Hoge tied for third in the individual portion of the 2009 NCAA Championship, and also won several North Dakota and Minnesota amateur titles.

== Professional career ==
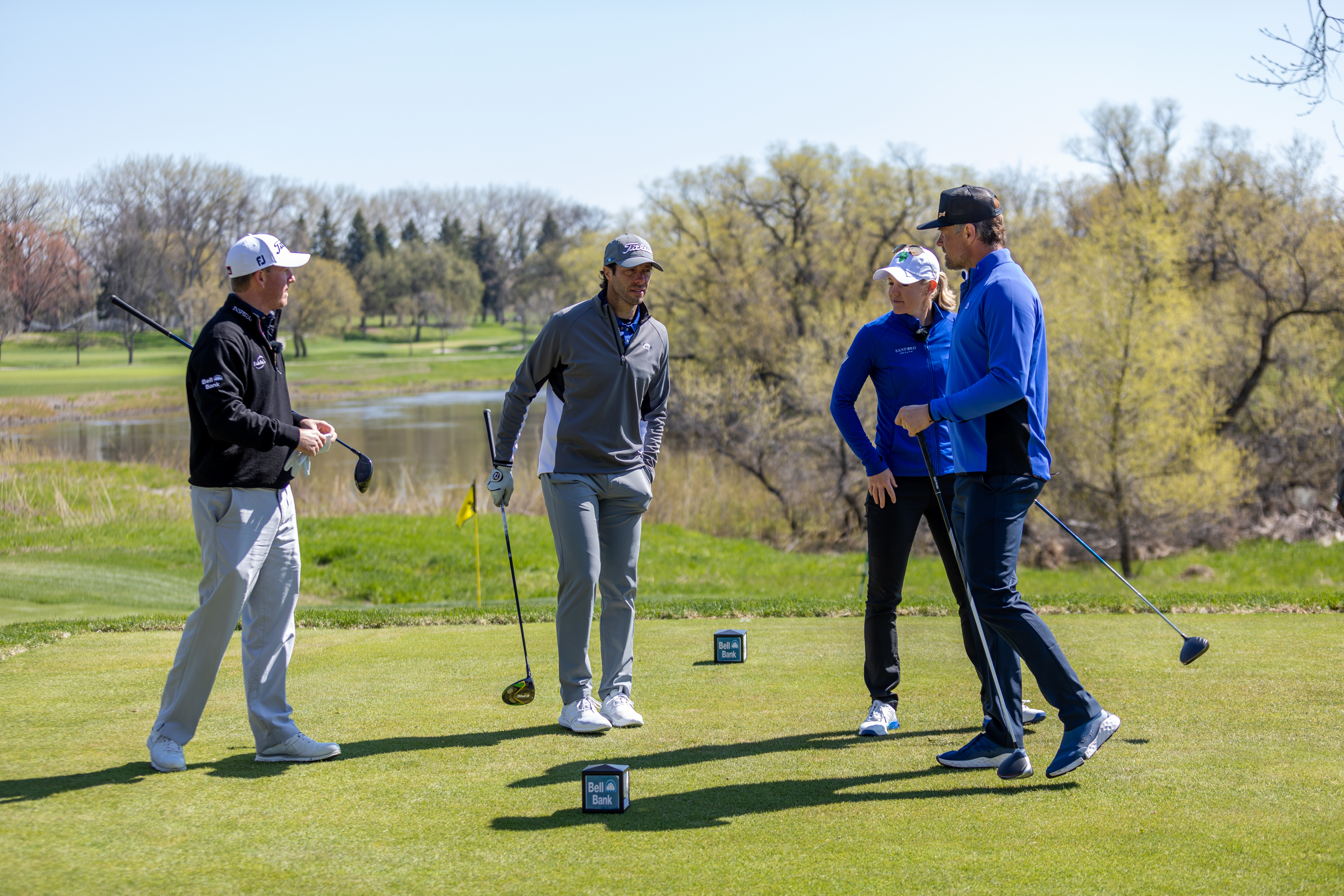
Hoge (far left) with Matt Cullen, Amy Olson and Josh Duhamel at a charity golf event, 2020.

Hoge turned professional after graduating from college in 2011, initially on the Canadian Tour, where he won that year's Canadian Tour Players Cup. He played on the Web.com Tour from 2012 through 2014; his best finishes were a pair of second-place finishes at the 2013 BMW Charity Pro-Am and the Nationwide Children's Hospital Championship in September 2015.

Hoge has played on the PGA Tour since 2015; that August, he co-led after 36-holes (with Tiger Woods) at the Wyndham Championship. His first 54-hole lead was at the Sony Open in Hawaii in January 2018, where he climbed from second after 36 holes, but shot par in the final round and finished a stroke back in third place.

In his 203rd start on the PGA Tour, Hoge gained his first victory in February 2022 at the AT&T Pebble Beach Pro-Am. He shot a final round 68 for 268 (–19), two strokes ahead of runner-up Jordan Spieth.

In March 2023, Hoge made the cut at the Players Championship on the number, then set a tournament record by shooting a 10-under 62 in the third round.

== Amateur wins ==
- 2006 North Dakota Stroke Play Championship
- 2007 North Dakota Match Play Championship
- 2008 North Dakota Match Play Championship, Columbia Invitational
- 2009 Minnesota State Amateur
- 2010 Minnesota State Amateur
- 2011 Morris Williams Intercollegiate

== Professional wins (4) ==
=== PGA Tour wins (1) ===
No.	Date	Tournament	Winning score	To par	Margin of victory	Runner-up
1	Feb 6, 2022	AT&T Pebble Beach Pro-Am	63-69-68-68=268	−19	2 strokes	(United States) Jordan Spieth

=== Canadian Tour wins (1) ===
No.	Date	Tournament	Winning score	To par	Margin of victory	Runner-up
1	Jul 17, 2011	Canadian Tour Players Cup	66-67-69-66=268	−16	2 strokes	(Chile) Benjamín Alvarado

=== Other wins (2) ===
No.	Date	Tournament	Winning score	To par	Margin of victory	Runner(s)-up
1	Aug 27, 2017	Bobcat North Dakota Open	69-63-64=196	−20	4 strokes	(United States) Andrew McCain
2	Dec 11, 2022	QBE Shootout (with (United States) Sahith Theegala)	60-60-62=182	−34	1 stroke	(United States) Charley Hoffman and (United States) Ryan Palmer

== Results in major championships ==
Results not in chronological order in 2020.

Tournament	2015	2016	2017	2018
Masters Tournament				
U.S. Open	CUT	CUT		
The Open Championship				
PGA Championship				

Tournament	2019	2020	2021	2022	2023	2024	2025	2026
Masters Tournament				T39	CUT		T14	
PGA Championship		T58	T64	T9	T58	T23	CUT	T26
U.S. Open	T43		T46	CUT	CUT	CUT	CUT	
The Open Championship		NT		CUT	CUT	T72	CUT	

Top 10
Did not play

CUT = missed the half-way cut
"T" indicates a tie for a place
NT = no tournament due to COVID-19 pandemic

=== Summary ===
Tournament	Wins	2nd	3rd	Top-5	Top-10	Top-25	Events	Cuts made
Masters Tournament	0	0	0	0	0	1	3	2
PGA Championship	0	0	0	0	1	2	7	6
U.S. Open	0	0	0	0	0	0	8	2
The Open Championship	0	0	0	0	0	0	4	1
Totals	0	0	0	0	1	3	22	11

- Most consecutive cuts made – 6 (2019 U.S. Open – 2022 PGA)
- Longest streak of top-10s – 1 (once)

== Results in The Players Championship ==
Tournament	2018	2019	2020	2021	2022	2023	2024	2025	2026
The Players Championship	T72	T30	C	T22	T33	T3	T54	T3	CUT

Top 10

CUT = missed the half-way cut
"T" indicates a tie for a place
C = canceled after the first round due to the COVID-19 pandemic

== Results in World Golf Championships ==
Tournament	2022	2023
Match Play	T58	T59
Champions	NT^{1}	

^{1}Canceled due to the COVID-19 pandemic
"T" = Tied
NT = No tournament
Note that the Champions was discontinued from 2023.

== See also ==
- 2014 Web.com Tour Finals graduates
- 2015 Web.com Tour Finals graduates
- 2017 Web.com Tour Finals graduates
- 2019 Korn Ferry Tour Finals graduates
