= Jon Rahm =

Spanish professional golfer (born 1994)

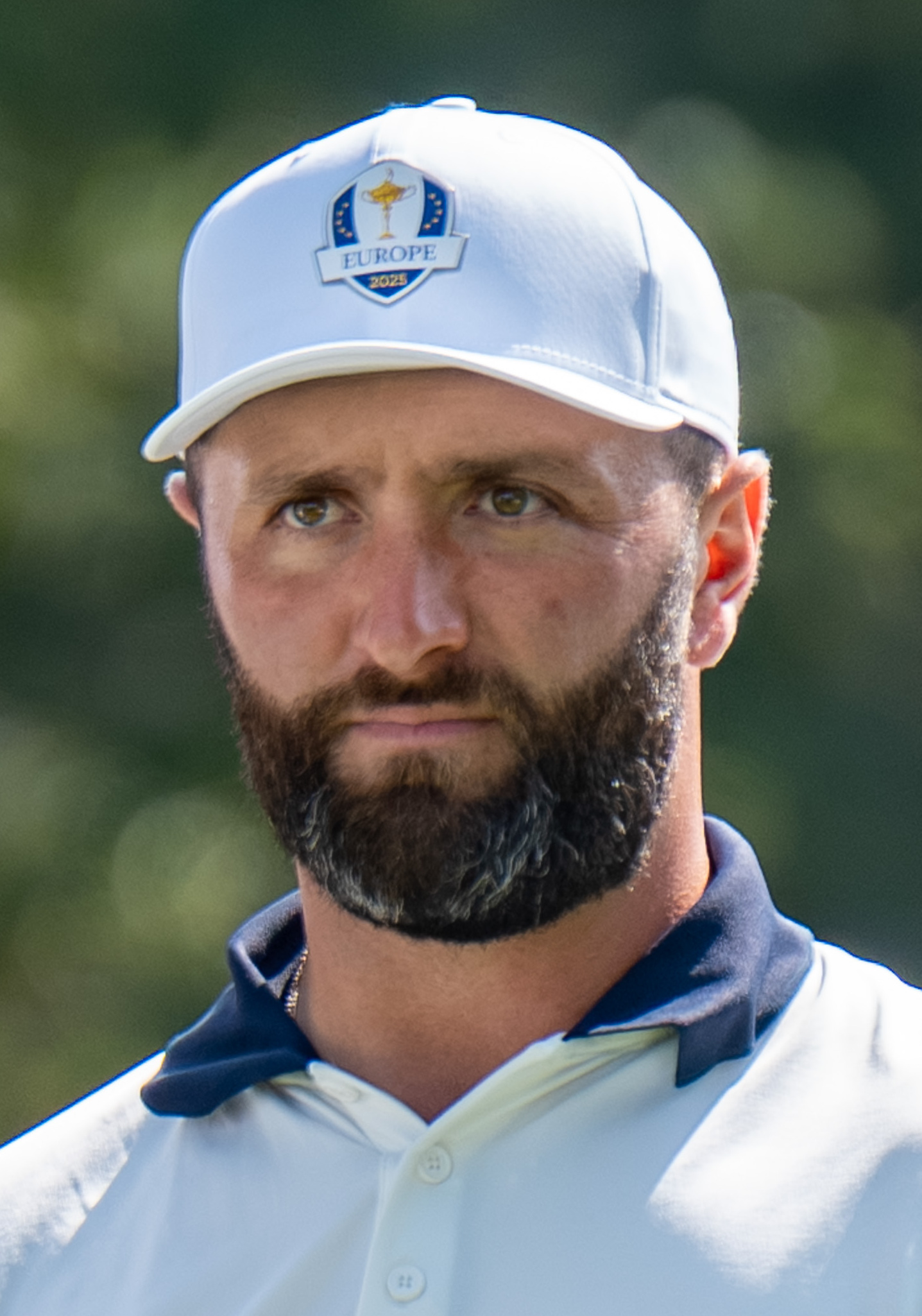
- Rahm at the 2025 Ryder Cup

Personal information
- Full name: Jon Rahm Rodríguez
- Nicknames: Rahmbo, Big Spain
- Nationality: Spain
- Born: 10 November 1994 (age 32) Barrika, Biscay, Spain
- Height: 6 ft 2 in (188 cm)
- Weight: 220 lb (100 kg)
- Spouse: Kelley Cahill (m. 2019)
- Children: 4

Career
- Sport: Golf
- College: Arizona State University
- Turned professional: 2016
- Current tour: European Tour
- Former tours: PGA Tour; LIV Golf
- Professional wins: 25
- Highest ranking: 1 (19 July 2020) (52 weeks)

Number of wins by tour
- PGA Tour: 11
- European Tour: 11
- LIV Golf: 4
- Other: 1

Best results in major championships (wins: 2)
- Masters Tournament: Won: 2023
- PGA Championship: T2: 2026
- U.S. Open: Won: 2021
- The Open Championship: T2: 2023

Achievements and awards
- Mark H. McCormack Medal: 2015
- Sir Henry Cotton Rookie of the Year: 2017
- European Tour Race to Dubai winner: 2019
- European Tour Golfer of the Year: 2019
- European Tour Player of the Year: 2019, 2021
- PGA Tour money list winner: 2020–21
- PGA Player of the Year: 2021
- Byron Nelson Award: 2020–21
- Vardon Trophy: 2021
- (For a full list of awards, see here)

Jon Rahm Rodríguez (born 10 November 1994) is a Spanish professional golfer who plays on the European Tour. He is a former world number one in the Official World Golf Ranking. Rahm has won two major championships, the 2021 U.S. Open and 2023 Masters Tournament.

While at Arizona State University, Rahm became the first two-time winner of the Ben Hogan Award as the top collegiate golfer in the United States and was number one in the World Amateur Golf Ranking for a then-record 60 weeks. He turned professional in 2016, and won titles on both the PGA Tour and the European Tour in 2017. He made his debut at the 2018 Ryder Cup, where he defeated Tiger Woods in singles. After winning the 2020 Memorial Tournament, Rahm became the number-one ranked player in the world, a position he has held for over 50 weeks during his career.

In 2021, Rahm became the first Spanish golfer to win the U.S. Open. He won his second major in 2023 at the Masters Tournament. Later that year, he joined LIV Golf. In 2024, Rahm was ranked the world's second highest-paid athlete by Forbes, with reportedly over $200 million in earnings.

== Early life ==
Rahm was born on 10 November 1994 in Barrika, a town in the province of Biscay, Spain. His mother Angela Rodríguez was a midwife, and his father Edorta Rahm worked in the petroleum industry. Rahm was born with clubfoot; his right foot pointed 90 degrees inwards and he was placed in a cast to straighten it. As a result, his right leg below the knee had less development and grew to be 1.5 cm (0.6 in) shorter than his left leg. Rahm stated in 2021 that his short backswing was a product of his limited right ankle mobility.

Rahm's parents became interested in golf due to the 1997 Ryder Cup held at Valderrama Golf Club in Sotogrande, Spain, where Seve Ballesteros captained the victorious European team. Rahm's father subsequently introduced his sons to the sport. Rahm stated he likely would not have become a professional golfer if not for this. In 2022, he described Ballesteros as a "great hero" of his and said regarding the 1997 Ryder Cup. "I'm here because of that alone, and everything else is down to the path that [Seve] paved for so many of us."

Rahm and his elder brother Eriz first played golf at Club Deportivo Martiartu in Erandio, which was a general sports club. They later joined Larrabea Golf Club in Álava, which was about an hour's drive from their home. Members at Larrabea recalled that Rahm was able to hit the ball over 100 m (110 yd) with a 5-wood by age 8. Aside from golf, he competed in canoeing, football, and the Basque sport jai alai. Rahm was often involved in fights as a child and began training in kung fu, at the encouragement of his mother who practiced tai chi. Inspired by Athletic Bilbao player José Ángel Iribar, Rahm played as a goalkeeper for SD Plentzia up to the under-14 level.

At age 13, Rahm began to focus primarily on golf and received coaching from PGA of Spain professional Eduardo Celles, who instructed Rahm to hit fades instead of high hooks. Celles recalled in 2020 that Rahm had an intense work ethic and an exceptional memory, capable of remembering small details about courses such as the slopes of greens. He won the Spanish Junior/Boys Championship in 2010 by six strokes. Rahm attended Ander Deuna Ikastola in Sopela until age 16, when he transferred to IES Ortega y Gasset, a school in Madrid renowned for its athletes. In 2011, he was part of the Spanish team which won the European Boys' Team Championship, where he defeated Sepp Straka of Austria as part of the final match.

== Collegiate career ==
Rahm was recruited by Tim Mickelson to play collegiate golf for the Arizona State Sun Devils at Arizona State University (ASU), beginning in the fall of 2012. Rahm had previously planned to attend the University of San Francisco in 2013. He was persuaded to join ASU after learning that Tim's brother Phil Mickelson as well as Alejandro Cañizares had played for the university, and because his friend Noemí Jiménez was on the women's team at ASU.

Rahm initially struggled at ASU as he spoke little English and had difficulty controlling his emotions on the course. Mickelson considered withdrawing Rahm's scholarship and awarding it to someone else. In October 2012, Rahm shot 77-64-65 to place second at the Pac-12 Preview, which saved his scholarship. Later that month, he won his first individual collegiate title at the Bill Cullum Invitational, finishing three strokes clear of runner-up Grant Forrest. At the 2013 NCAA Division I men's golf championship, Rahm opened with a course-record 61, but followed with 72-71 to finish tied-second. He was named the 2013 Pac-12 Freshman of the Year, ranking first in the nation for birdies (165) and par-5 scoring (4.51). His scoring average was 71.37, the lowest mark by a freshman in ASU history.

In March 2014, Rahm shot 21-under 192 to win the ASU Thunderbird Invitational. This broke the ASU record for lowest 54-hole total. He had a scoring average of 70.84 in his sophomore season. He helped Spain win the 2014 European Amateur Team Championship in July and was the individual leader in the 2014 Eisenhower Trophy in September, where his aggregate score of 263 broke the event's scoring record of 269 set by Jack Nicklaus in 1960.

In his junior season, Rahm won four individual titles and had a 69.15 scoring average. He was named a first-team All-American and won the Ben Hogan Award as the top collegiate golfer in the United States. During the season, Rahm played in the PGA Tour's Phoenix Open in February 2015 on a sponsor exemption. He shot 12-under 272 to finish tied-fifth, three strokes behind the winner Brooks Koepka. He was ineligible for the $239,400 payout due to his amateur status. Rahm overtook Ollie Schniederjans to reach the number-one spot in the World Amateur Golf Ranking in April 2015.

Rahm won the Mark H. McCormack Medal in August 2015 as the top-ranked amateur golfer, thus earning exemptions to the U.S. Open and the Open Championship the next year. He was overtaken in the rankings by Maverick McNealy in September. The following month, Rahm regained the number-one ranking after winning the Tavistock Collegiate Invitational. In his senior season at ASU, Rahm finished top-10 in all 13 of his starts. He won four individual titles, including the Pac-12 Championship, and recorded a 69.38 scoring average for the season. He was again named a first-team All-American, and became the first two-time recipient of the Ben Hogan Award. Rahm graduated with a Bachelor of Arts degree in communications in May 2016. His total of 11 individual collegiate wins at ASU was second only to Phil Mickelson's 16.

At the 2016 U.S. Open in June, Rahm was the only amateur to make the cut. He shot 7-over 287 at Oakmont Country Club to finish in tied-23rd place and received the low amateur medal. Rahm subsequently turned professional. He ended his amateur career with a record 60 weeks atop the World Amateur Golf Ranking. This record stood until 2022, when Keita Nakajima reached a total of 87 weeks as number one.

== Professional career ==
=== 2016–2017: First PGA and European Tour wins ===
Following the 2016 U.S. Open, Rahm turned professional and signed with management agency Lagardère Sports. By turning professional, he forfeited his place at the 2016 Open Championship. Rahm made his debut as a professional the next week at the PGA Tour's Quicken Loans National on a sponsor exemption. He opened with a 64 at Congressional Country Club and finished the tournament in tied-third place. This meant he re-qualified for the 2016 Open Championship in July. Rahm finished tied-59th at the Open, then tied for second at the RBC Canadian Open the following week, which earned him special temporary membership status on the PGA Tour. Despite his limited number of starts, Rahm accumulated enough points to earn a tour card for the 2016–17 PGA Tour season.

In January 2017, Rahm shot a final-round 65, which included a 60-foot (18 m) putt for eagle on the last hole, to win the Farmers Insurance Open by three strokes over Charles Howell III and C. T. Pan. This was Rahm's first PGA Tour victory, and it moved him from 137th to 46th in the Official World Golf Ranking. In March, Rahm finished tied-third at the 2017 WGC-Mexico Championship, two strokes behind world number one Dustin Johnson. Later that month, Rahm reached the final of the 2017 WGC-Dell Technologies Match Play. He was defeated by Dustin Johnson, 1 up. These results moved Rahm up to 14th in the Official World Golf Ranking.

At the 2017 Masters Tournament in April, Rahm shot rounds of 73-70 to make the cut on his debut at Augusta National Golf Club and stood three strokes behind the 36-hole lead. Rahm followed with rounds of 73-75 to place tied-27th. In May, he finished runner-up at the Dean & DeLuca Invitational, one stroke behind the winner Kevin Kisner. Rahm led the field in driving distance during the tournament, held at the tree-lined Colonial Country Club. At the Dubai Duty Free Irish Open in July, Rahm shot a tournament record score of 24-under 264 to win by six strokes. This was his first victory on the European Tour. The win vaulted Rahm to 8th in the Official World Golf Ranking.

Rahm finished the regular season in sixth place in the PGA Tour's FedEx Cup rankings. He had top-10 finishes in all four of the FedEx Cup Playoff events held from August to September and finished fifth in the final standings. Rahm was ineligible for the PGA Tour Rookie of the Year award in 2017 as he had exhausted his rookie eligibility in the 2015–16 season by making nine starts. Xander Schauffele instead received the award.

On 14 November 2017, Rahm was named the European Tour's Sir Henry Cotton Rookie of the Year. Some European Tour players such as Richard Bland and Eddie Pepperell criticised the award being given to Rahm as he had played only four regular European Tour events during the season. Later that week, Rahm shot 19-under 269 to win the European Tour's season-ending tournament, the DP World Tour Championship. This moved him to 4th in the Official World Golf Ranking.

=== 2018: Ryder Cup debut ===
In his first start of 2018, Rahm finished runner-up at the Sentry Tournament of Champions, eight strokes behind Dustin Johnson. Later in January, Rahm won the CareerBuilder Challenge for his second career PGA Tour victory. He prevailed with a birdie on the fourth extra hole of a playoff against Andrew Landry. The win lifted Rahm to a new-high of 2nd in the world rankings. This made it four wins in just 38 professional starts for Rahm – a ratio bettered only by Tiger Woods in the past 30 years.

At the 2018 Masters Tournament in April, Rahm opened with a 3-over 75. He followed with rounds of 68 and 65 to move into contention. He ultimately finished fourth at 11-under, four strokes behind winner Patrick Reed. This was Rahm's first top-10 finish in a major championship. The following week, Rahm won the Open de España on the European Tour. He shot a 5-under 67 in the final round to finish two strokes ahead of 54-hole leader Paul Dunne. Rahm finished tied-fourth at the 2018 PGA Championship in August with 11-under 269, five strokes behind Brooks Koepka's winning mark.

In September 2018, Rahm qualified for the European team participating in the 2018 Ryder Cup. The European team won the Ryder Cup, defeating the U.S. 17.5 to 10.5 at Le Golf National outside of Paris, France. In the Sunday singles, Rahm defeated Tiger Woods, 2 and 1. He became the first player to defeat Woods in singles at the Ryder Cup since Costantino Rocca in 1997.

Rahm won his third title of the year in December, at the limited-field Hero World Challenge tournament in the Bahamas. He shot 20-under 268 to win by four strokes ahead of Tony Finau.

=== 2019: Four-win season, first Race to Dubai title ===
Rahm shot a 64 in the third round of the 2019 Players Championship in March to take the solo lead. A final-round 76 dropped him to tied-12th. Rahm won his first tournament of 2019 in April, at the Zurich Classic of New Orleans. He and his partner Ryan Palmer combined to shoot 26-under 262 and win the team event by three strokes over Tommy Fleetwood and Sergio García. This was Rahm's seventh top-10 finish of the year to date, including a tie for ninth at the 2019 Masters Tournament two weeks prior.

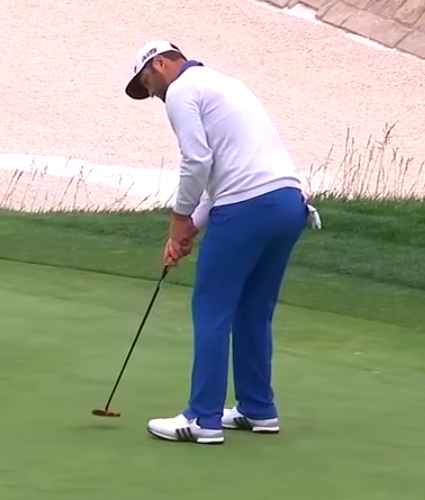
Rahm putting at the 2019 U.S. Open at Pebble Beach Golf Links

At the 2019 U.S. Open held at Pebble Beach Golf Links in June, Rahm finished in tied-third with a 7-under 277. In July, Rahm won the Dubai Duty Free Irish Open for the second time in his career. He trailed leader Robert Rock by five shots after 54 holes, but shot a final-round 62 to claim a two-stroke victory.

In September, Rahm was tied for the lead after three rounds at the BMW PGA Championship. He ultimately finished runner-up, three strokes behind 54-hole co-leader Danny Willett. The following month, Rahm successfully defended his title at the Open de España. He entered the final round with a five-shot lead and maintained that advantage with a 5-under 66 to finish on 22-under 262.

Rahm added his fourth victory of the year at the DP World Tour Championship, Dubai in November. In doing so, he won the season-long Race to Dubai title on the European Tour for the first time in his career. He became the second Spaniard to win the European Tour's order of merit, after Seve Ballesteros. Rahm also won the European Tour Golfer of the Year award for 2019.

=== 2020: Reaching world number one ===
In January, Rahm held the outright lead after 54 holes at the Farmers Insurance Open. He shot a final-round 70 to fall into second-place, one stroke behind winner Marc Leishman, who shot 65. At the 2020 WGC-Mexico Championship in February, Rahm set a new course record with a 10-under 61 in the third round, including a hole in one on the par-3 17th, to move into contention. He finished in tied-third place, three strokes behind the champion Patrick Reed.

In the early years of his professional career, Rahm became known for his volatile temper on the course, such as throwing his clubs and punching a tee marker. During the suspension of the PGA Tour in 2020 due to the COVID-19 pandemic, Rahm stated that he had focused on journaling, which he said had helped him to control his anger.

At the Memorial Tournament in July, Rahm shot rounds of 69-67-68 to establish a four-shot lead after 54 holes. In the final round, he chipped in for birdie on the par-3 16th, but was later assessed a two-stroke penalty as the ball had moved slightly when he grounded the club nearby. He ultimately posted a 3-over 75 to win by three shots. This was the tenth victory of his professional career. With the win, Rahm overtook Rory McIlroy to reach number one in the Official World Golf Ranking. Aged 25, he became the second Spaniard after Seve Ballesteros to top the world rankings. Rahm was overtaken by Justin Thomas two weeks later, but regained the ranking the following week.

In August, Rahm was in tied-39th place at 6-over-par after two rounds of the BMW Championship. He rebounded with a third-round 66 and a final-round 64, the lowest round of the tournament, to finish joint-first at 4-under 276 and entered a playoff with 54-hole leader Dustin Johnson. Rahm made a 66-foot (20 m) putt for birdie on the first playoff hole to claim the title. This was his fifth PGA Tour victory and his first in a FedEx Cup playoff event. Rahm finished runner-up at the Zozo Championship in October, one stroke behind Patrick Cantlay. At the 2020 Masters Tournament in November, Rahm held a share of the lead after two rounds at 9-under. He followed with rounds of 72-71 to finish in a tie for seventh.

=== 2021: First major victory ===
On 4 January 2021, it was announced that Rahm had signed a multi-year agreement with Callaway Golf Company, thus ending his association with TaylorMade that began when he turned professional. The deal included all equipment and clothing. He had previously used Callaway equipment during his time at Arizona State University.

At the 2021 Masters Tournament in April, Rahm shot a final-round 66 to finish tied-fifth. This was his fourth consecutive top-10 finish at the Masters. He shot a final-round 68 at the 2019 PGA Championship the following month to finish tied-eighth. In June, Rahm was forced to withdraw as the defending champion from the Memorial Tournament due to a positive COVID-19 test. At the time of the withdrawal, he had completed the third round with a record 54-hole score of 18-under and held a six-stroke lead.

Rahm shot 67 in the final round of the 2021 U.S. Open at Torrey Pines in June to win his first major championship. Trailing by three strokes after 54 holes, he finished with birdies on the final two holes to finish one stroke ahead of runner-up Louis Oosthuizen. Rahm became the first Spaniard to win the U.S. Open. He dedicated his win to the late Spanish golfer Seve Ballesteros.

In July, Rahm recorded a third-place finish at the 2021 Open Championship. This meant he finished top-10 at all four majors in the same season for the first time in his career. As Rahm prepared to travel to Tokyo for the men's individual tournament at the 2020 Summer Olympics, he again tested positive for COVID-19, forcing him to withdraw from the event. Jorge Campillo represented Spain at the Olympics in Rahm's place. In his next start, Rahm shot rounds of 63-67-67 to share a tie for the lead alongside Cameron Smith at The Northern Trust in August. A final round of 69 saw him finish in solo-third, two shots shy of a playoff between Smith and Tony Finau.

At the start of September, Rahm finished second in the Tour Championship with an aggregate score of 20-under, one stroke behind Patrick Cantlay. For his performances during the 2020–21 PGA Tour season, Rahm won the PGA Player of the Year award presented by the PGA of America, as well as the Vardon Trophy and the Byron Nelson Award for lowest scoring average. Later in September, Rahm played for the European team in the 2021 Ryder Cup at Whistling Straits in Wisconsin. The U.S. team won 19–9 and Rahm went 3–1–1. He won all three matches when paired with compatriot Sergio García, but lost his Sunday singles match against Scottie Scheffler.

=== 2022: Continued success ===
Rahm started 2022 at the Sentry Tournament of Champions at Kapalua Resort in Hawaii. He shot 33-under 259 including a 61 in the third round. This broke the previous PGA Tour scoring record of 31-under set by Ernie Els in 2003, however it was not enough to win the tournament as Cameron Smith finished on 34-under to take the title and eclipse the scoring record. Three weeks later, at the Farmers Insurance Open, Rahm finished tied-third, one shot out of the playoff between Luke List and Will Zalatoris.

In May, Rahm won the Mexico Open for his seventh career PGA Tour victory. In his title defense at the 2022 U.S. Open, Rahm was one stroke behind the lead after 54 holes. He shot a final-round 74 to finish tied-12th. In September, he shot a final-round 62 to finish tied-second at the BMW PGA Championship, one shot behind Shane Lowry. In October, Rahm won the Acciona Open de España, shooting a final-round 62 to win by six shots ahead of Matthieu Pavon. It was his third Open de España title. In November, Rahm won the DP World Tour Championship with 20-under 268, two shots ahead of Tyrrell Hatton and Alex Norén. It was his ninth European Tour win and fifth Rolex Series win.

=== 2023: Masters victory ===
Rahm began 2023 by winning the Sentry Tournament of Champions in January, two shots ahead of Collin Morikawa. He shot a 10-under 63 in the final round to overcome a six-shot deficit after 54 holes. Two weeks later, Rahm won The American Express, shooting 27-under to beat Davis Thompson by one shot. The next week, Rahm was in second place after 54 holes at the Farmers Insurance Open. A final-round 74 saw him finish in tied-seventh.

In February, Rahm finished third at the WM Phoenix Open. The following week, he won the Genesis Invitational. Rahm shot 17-under 267 at Riviera Country Club to finish two strokes clear of runner-up Max Homa. It was Rahm's fifth worldwide win in nine starts. In his next start, at the Arnold Palmer Invitational in March, Rahm took the first-round lead with a 7-under 65. He followed with rounds of 76-76-72 to finish tied-39th. This ended his streak of 10 consecutive top-10 finishes. Rahm opened with a 1-under 71 at the 2023 Players Championship the following week, but was forced to withdraw due to illness.

At the 2023 Masters Tournament in April, Rahm four-putted for double bogey on his opening hole, but rallied to shoot a 7-under 65 and share a tie of the first-round lead. After the third round was delayed due to inclement weather, he had to play 30 holes on Sunday, in which he started four strokes behind the leader Brooks Koepka. Rahm shot a 3-under 69 in the final round to total 12-under 276 and win his second major title, by four strokes ahead of Koepka and Phil Mickelson. With the victory, Rahm became the first golfer from Europe to win both the U.S. Open and the Masters. He also reclaimed the number one ranking in the Official World Golf Ranking. In his next start, Rahm finished runner-up at the Mexico Open, three strokes behind Tony Finau. At the 2023 PGA Championship in May, Rahm finished tied-50th. He was thus overtaken as world number one by Scottie Scheffler, who had finished tied-second.

Rahm shot a final-round 65 to finish tied-10th at the 2023 U.S. Open held in June at Los Angeles Country Club. At the 2023 Open Championship in July, he shot an 8-under 63 in the third round to move into contention. This set a new course record at Royal Liverpool Golf Club. A final-round 70 saw Rahm finish in a four-way tie for second, six strokes behind Brian Harman. In September, Rahm played on the European team in the 2023 Ryder Cup, held at Marco Simone Golf and Country Club in Italy. The European team won 16.5–11.5 and Rahm had an unbeaten record of 2–0–2, including a tie in his Sunday singles match against world number one Scottie Scheffler.

=== Move to LIV Golf ===
In February 2022, amid discussion of the formation of a Saudi-backed golf league, Rahm said "I am officially declaring my fealty to the PGA Tour". In June of that year, after the creation of LIV Golf, Rahm said the LIV Golf format was not appealing to him: "Shotgun three days to me is not a golf tournament, no cut. It's that simple". He also said that he played golf for history and legacy, and that receiving $400 million would not change his lifestyle. Following the announcement of a framework agreement between the PGA Tour and LIV Golf in June 2023, Rahm stated that "a lot of people feel a bit of betrayal from management." While on the Spanish-language Golf Sin Etiquetas podcast in August 2023, Rahm said: "I laugh when people rumor me with LIV Golf. I never liked the format."

In December 2023, Rahm announced on Special Report with Bret Baier that he had joined LIV Golf, after signing a reported nine-figure contract with the league. His decision to join drew accusations of hypocrisy given his past statements. The PGA Tour subsequently suspended Rahm. Forbes reported that Rahm had received a guaranteed $350 million to join LIV Golf, the largest contract in LIV history to that point.

=== 2024: LIV Golf debut ===
Rahm debuted for LIV Golf in February 2024 at LIV Golf Mayakoba, where the Legion XIII team which he had created after joining LIV won the team title. Rahm finished tied-third in the individual portion of the tournament, two strokes out of a playoff between Sergio García and Joaquín Niemann.

In his title defense at the 2024 Masters Tournament in April, Rahm shot 9-over 297 to finish tied-45th. At the 2024 PGA Championship in May, he shot rounds of 70-72 to miss the cut. This ended Rahm's streak of 18 consecutive made cuts in major championships. In June, Rahm withdrew from the 2024 U.S. Open held at Pinehurst No. 2. He announced his withdrawal two days prior to the tournament's start, citing a foot injury. At the 2024 Open Championship in July, Rahm shot a final-round 68 to finish in tied-seventh at 1-under 283.

Rahm won his first LIV tournament at LIV Golf UK in July. He shot 13-under 200 to finish one stroke ahead of Tyrrell Hatton, Joaquín Niemann, and Cameron Smith. Rahm qualified to represent Spain at the men's individual tournament at the 2024 Summer Olympics, where he shared the 54-hole lead at 14-under alongside Xander Schauffele. After a birdie on the 10th hole in the final round, Rahm established a four-stroke lead at 20-under. He struggled afterwards and finished in tied-fifth at 15-under, four strokes behind winner Scottie Scheffler and outside of the medal places. Rahm stated: "I not only feel like I let myself down but to just not get it done for the whole country of Spain, it’s a lot more painful than I would like it to be." Two weeks later, Rahm finished runner-up at LIV Golf Greenbrier, losing in a playoff to Brooks Koepka.

In September, Rahm shot a final-round 66 to win LIV Golf Chicago. With the win, he finished as the leader in the season-long LIV Golf points standings, netting him an additional $18 million in bonus money. Two weeks later, Rahm finished runner-up at the Acciona Open de España. He lost in a playoff to fellow Spaniard Ángel Hidalgo.

=== 2025: Winless season ===
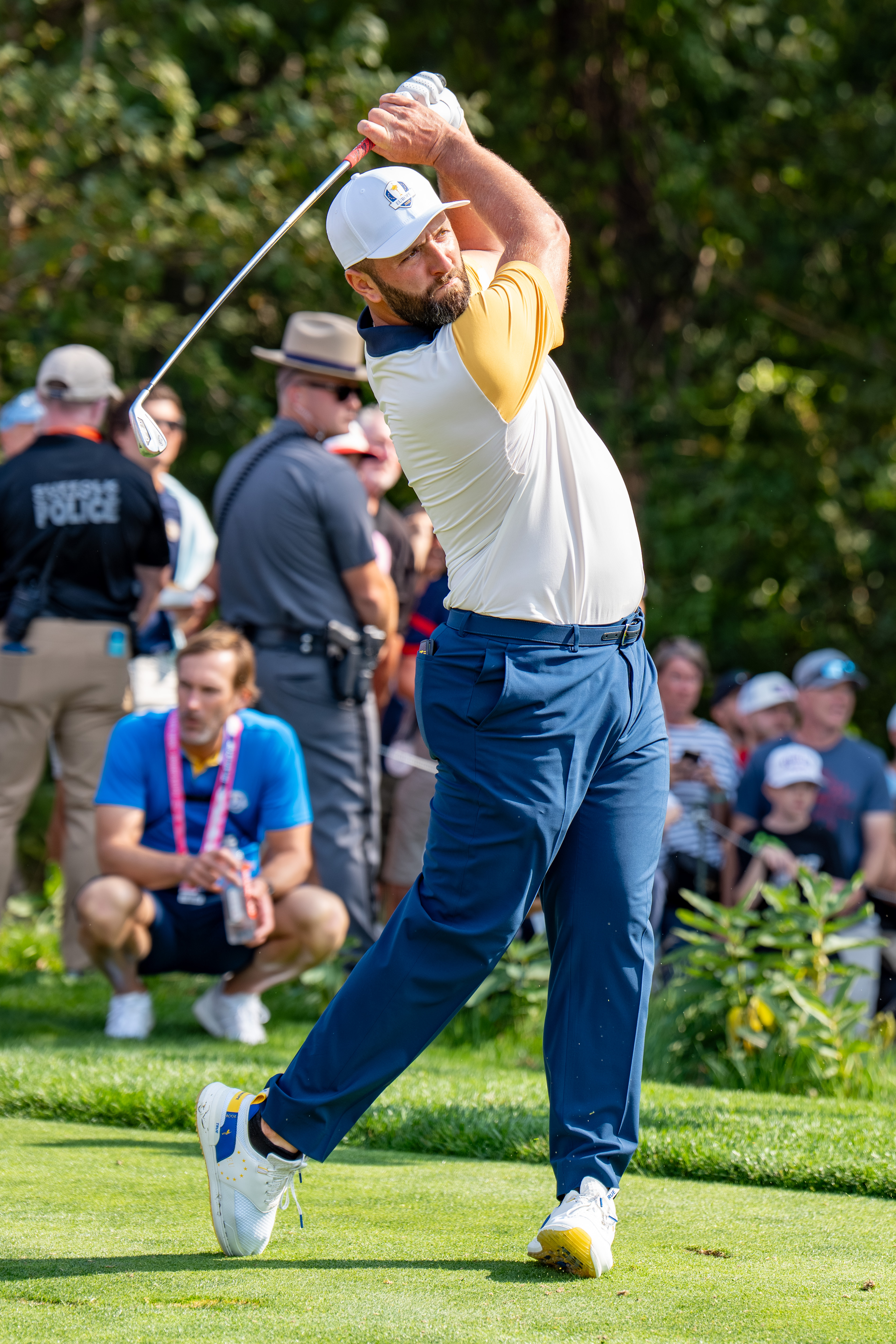
Rahm during a practice round at the 2025 Ryder Cup in September

In February, Rahm finished tied-second at LIV Golf Riyadh, two strokes behind Adrian Meronk. At the 2025 PGA Championship in May, Rahm was tied for the lead at 9-under during the back nine of the final round, but dropped five strokes in his final three holes to finish tied-eighth at 4-under 280. In June, Rahm shot a final-round 67 to finish tied-seventh at the 2025 U.S. Open held at Oakmont Country Club.

Rahm finished runner-up at LIV Golf Andalucía in July, one stroke behind Talor Gooch. He also finished tied-second alongside Josele Ballester at LIV Golf Chicago in August, losing in a three-way playoff to Dean Burmester. The following week, Rahm shot a final-round 60 to enter a playoff with Sebastián Muñoz at LIV Golf Indianapolis. Rahm lost to birdie on the first extra hole. Although he was winless during the 2025 LIV Golf League season, Rahm finished as the leader in the season-long standings, 2.48 points ahead of Joaquín Niemann, who won five titles. In his 13 LIV Golf starts during the year, Rahm recorded 12 top-10 finishes; his worst finish was a tie for 11th at LIV Golf Dallas.

In September, Rahm was selected as a captain's pick for the 2025 Ryder Cup. He had a 3–2–0 record, including a loss in the Sunday singles against Xander Schauffele, as Europe defeated the United States by a score of 15 to 13. After finishing tied-ninth at the Open de España in October, Rahm stated he would take a break from competition until February 2026. This meant he had his first winless season since turning professional in 2016.

=== 2026 ===
In the first event of the 2026 LIV Golf League season, Rahm shot a final-round 63 to place second at LIV Golf Riyadh in February. He finished one stroke behind Elvis Smylie. The following week, Rahm finished runner-up at LIV Golf Adelaide, three strokes behind Anthony Kim. In March, Rahm posted 23-under 257 to win the LIV Golf Hong Kong event by three strokes over Thomas Detry. This was Rahm's first individual victory for 18 months and he described it as "a big weight off my shoulder." Two weeks later, Rahm recorded his third runner-up finish of the year, losing in a playoff at LIV Golf South Africa to Bryson DeChambeau.

Rahm won his second tournament of the year at LIV Golf Mexico City in April. He closed with a 7-under 64 to finish six shots ahead of runner-up David Puig. At the LIV Golf Virginia tournament in May, Rahm made the first albatross of his career. He holed his second shot on the par-5 17th at Trump National Golf Club Washington, D.C. as part of a final-round 69 to finish tied-eighth.

At the 2026 PGA Championship in May, Rahm shot a final-round 68 to finish runner-up, three strokes behind Aaron Rai, who closed with a 65. Rahm said afterwards: "I played really good golf. Just wish I'd have done better with the speed of the greens. Just couldn't seem to get it to the hole, and that's the reason why I didn't hole any more putts. Even so, with what Aaron [Rai] did today, catching him would have been very difficult."

In August, Rahm shot a final-round 63 to place solo-second at LIV Golf Indianapolis, one stroke behind Michael La Sasso. This was the final event of the 2026 LIV Golf League season; the season-ending, team-championship event in Michigan was cancelled following Saudi Arabia's withdrawal of investment in the league. Rahm topped the LIV points list for the third consecutive year. As of the conclusion of the 2026 season, Rahm ranked first on LIV Golf's all-time money list, with $105,645,125 in on-course earnings.

During a LIV Golf bankruptcy hearing in October 2026, Rahm's lawyer John Beck stated that Rahm would not participate in LIV Golf's proposed 2027 season. Sky Sports reported that Rahm was owed up to $150 million on his contract with LIV Golf prior to the league's bankruptcy.

Rahm shot 23-under 265 to win the Abu Dhabi Aldar Championship in November, two strokes ahead of Tyrrell Hatton. This was his sixth Rolex Series victory. With the win, Rahm moved to sixth in the Official World Golf Ranking.

== Personal life ==
Rahm's surname originates from his Swiss forefather George Rahm, a carpenter born in Unterhallau in 1778 who moved to Bilbao and started a cabinet-making business. Rahm's father is a Biscayan, while his mother is from Madrid. Rahm speaks Spanish, English and Basque.

Rahm's grandfather, Sabin Rahm, was a delegate for the football club Athletic Bilbao for over 30 years. Rahm has been a vocal supporter of the club himself, and was honoured as the club's special guest at a game in December 2019.

As of 2023, Rahm lives in Scottsdale, Arizona. He met his wife Kelley (née Cahill) at a Halloween party during his freshman year at Arizona State University. Kelley is American and competed in javelin throw collegiately. He proposed to her in 2018 during a hike in Torrey Pines State Natural Reserve in California. They married in 2019 at the Basilica of Begoña, a Catholic church in Bilbao which Rahm attended during his youth. The couple had their first child, a son, in 2021. Rahm stated his son's name Kepa is of Basque origin but clarified that it was not a reference to his compatriot Kepa Arrizabalaga. They had a second son in 2022, a daughter in 2024, and a second daughter in 2026.

Rahm is a video game enthusiast and has stated that he travels to tournaments with a Nintendo Switch console. He is a long-time player and fan of the Call of Duty series. After winning the 2021 U.S. Open, Rahm stated that he had watched a Call of Duty match involving OpTic Chicago during the morning before his final round. In 2022, Rahm led the series A funding round for Oxygen Esports, which in the previous year had launched Boston Breach, a team in the Call of Duty League. Rahm said in 2026 that he played video games less frequently since becoming a father, but continued to watch competitive Call of Duty events.

== Amateur wins ==
- 2010 Spanish Junior Championship, Spanish Boys 18 Championship
- 2011 Copa Baleares, Campeonato de Madrid Absoluto
- 2012 Campeonato de España Junior Y Boys, Campeonato Absoluto País Vasco, Bill Cullum Invitational
- 2014 ASU Thunderbird Invitational, Campeonato de España Absoluto, Bill Cullum Invitational, Eisenhower Trophy (individual leader)
- 2015 Duck Invitational, ASU Thunderbird Invitational, NCAA San Diego Regional, Campeonato de España Absoluto, Tavistock Collegiate Invitational
- 2016 ASU Thunderbird Invitational, Pac-12 Championships, NCAA Albuquerque Regional

== Professional wins (25) ==
=== PGA Tour wins (11) ===
Legend
Major championships (2)
FedEx Cup playoff events (1)
Designated events (2)
Other PGA Tour (6)

No.	Date	Tournament	Winning score	To par	Margin of victory	Runner(s)-up
1	29 Jan 2017	Farmers Insurance Open	72-69-69-65=275	−13	3 strokes	(United States) Charles Howell III, (Taiwan) Pan Cheng-tsung
2	21 Jan 2018	CareerBuilder Challenge	62-67-70-67=266	−22	Playoff	(United States) Andrew Landry
3	28 Apr 2019	Zurich Classic of New Orleans (with (United States) Ryan Palmer)	64-65-64-69=262	−26	3 strokes	(England) Tommy Fleetwood and (Spain) Sergio García
4	19 Jul 2020	Memorial Tournament	69-67-68-75=279	−9	3 strokes	(United States) Ryan Palmer
5	30 Aug 2020	BMW Championship	75-71-66-64=276	−4	Playoff	(United States) Dustin Johnson
6	20 Jun 2021	U.S. Open	69-70-72-67=278	−6	1 stroke	(South Africa) Louis Oosthuizen
7	1 May 2022	Mexico Open	64-66-68-69=267	−17	1 stroke	(United States) Tony Finau, (United States) Kurt Kitayama, (United States) Brandon Wu
8	8 Jan 2023	Sentry Tournament of Champions	64-71-67-63=265	−27	2 strokes	(United States) Collin Morikawa
9	22 Jan 2023	The American Express (2)	64-64-65-68=261	−27	1 stroke	(United States) Davis Thompson
10	19 Feb 2023	Genesis Invitational	65-68-65-69=267	−17	2 strokes	(United States) Max Homa
11	9 Apr 2023	Masters Tournament	65-69-73-69=276	−12	4 strokes	(United States) Brooks Koepka, (United States) Phil Mickelson

PGA Tour playoff record (2–0)

No.	Year	Tournament	Opponent	Result
1	2018	CareerBuilder Challenge	(United States) Andrew Landry	Won with birdie on fourth extra hole
2	2020	BMW Championship	(United States) Dustin Johnson	Won with birdie on first extra hole

=== European Tour wins (11) ===
Legend
Major championships (2)
Tour C'ships/Playoff events (4)
Rolex Series (6) (Note: The Abu Dhabi Aldar Championship and DP World Tour Championship are also a Rolex Series tournaments.)
Other European Tour (3)

No.	Date	Tournament	Winning score	To par	Margin of victory	Runner(s)-up
1	9 Jul 2017	Dubai Duty Free Irish Open	65-67-67-65=264	−24	6 strokes	(Scotland) Richie Ramsay, (England) Matthew Southgate
2	19 Nov 2017	DP World Tour Championship, Dubai	69-68-65-67=269	−19	1 stroke	(Thailand) Kiradech Aphibarnrat, (Republic of Ireland) Shane Lowry
3	15 Apr 2018	Open de España	67-68-66-67=268	−20	2 strokes	(Republic of Ireland) Paul Dunne
4	7 Jul 2019	Dubai Duty Free Irish Open (2)	67-71-64-62=264	−16	2 strokes	(England) Andy Sullivan, (Austria) Bernd Wiesberger
5	6 Oct 2019	Mutuactivos Open de España (2)	66-67-63-66=262	−22	5 strokes	(Spain) Rafa Cabrera-Bello
6	24 Nov 2019	DP World Tour Championship, Dubai (2)	66-69-66-68=269	−19	1 stroke	(England) Tommy Fleetwood
7	20 Jun 2021	U.S. Open	69-70-72-67=278	−6	1 stroke	(South Africa) Louis Oosthuizen
8	9 Oct 2022	Acciona Open de España (3)	64-68-65-62=259	−25	6 strokes	(France) Matthieu Pavon
9	20 Nov 2022	DP World Tour Championship (3)	70-66-65-67=268	−20	2 strokes	(England) Tyrrell Hatton, (Sweden) Alex Norén
10	9 Apr 2023	Masters Tournament	65-69-73-69=276	−12	4 strokes	(United States) Brooks Koepka, (United States) Phil Mickelson
11	8 Nov 2026	Abu Dhabi Aldar Championship	65-67-66-67=265	−23	2 strokes	(England) Tyrrell Hatton

European Tour playoff record (0–1)

No.	Year	Tournament	Opponent	Result
1	2024	Acciona Open de España	(Spain) Ángel Hidalgo	Lost to birdie on second extra hole

=== LIV Golf League wins (4) ===
No.	Date	Tournament	Winning score	To par	Margin of victory	Runner(s)-up
1	28 Jul 2024	LIV Golf UK	63-70-67=200	−13	1 stroke	(England) Tyrrell Hatton, (Chile) Joaquín Niemann, (Australia) Cameron Smith
2	15 Sep 2024	LIV Golf Chicago	69-64-66=199	−11	3 strokes	(Spain) Sergio García, (Chile) Joaquín Niemann
3	8 Mar 2026	LIV Golf Hong Kong	66-62-65-64=257	−23	3 strokes	(Belgium) Thomas Detry
4	19 Apr 2026	LIV Golf Mexico City	65-67-67-64=263	−21	6 strokes	(Spain) David Puig

LIV Golf League playoff record (0–4)

No.	Year	Tournament	Opponent(s)	Result
1	2024	LIV Golf Greenbrier	(United States) Brooks Koepka	Lost to par on first extra hole
2	2025	LIV Golf Chicago	(Spain) Joséle Ballester, (South Africa) Dean Burmester	Burmester won with birdie on first extra hole
3	2025	LIV Golf Indianapolis	(Colombia) Sebastián Muñoz	Lost to birdie on first extra hole
4	2026	LIV Golf South Africa	(United States) Bryson DeChambeau	Lost to birdie on first extra hole

=== Other wins (1) ===
No.	Date	Tournament	Winning score	To par	Margin of victory	Runner-up
1	2 Dec 2018	Hero World Challenge	71-63-69-65=268	−20	4 strokes	(United States) Tony Finau

== Major championships ==
=== Wins (2) ===
Year	Championship	54 holes	Winning score	Margin	Runner(s)-up
2021	U.S. Open	3 shot deficit	−6 (69-70-72-67=278)	1 stroke	(South Africa) Louis Oosthuizen
2023	Masters Tournament	2 shot deficit	−12 (65-69-73-69=276)	4 strokes	(United States) Brooks Koepka, (United States) Phil Mickelson

=== Results timeline ===
Results not in chronological order in 2020.

Tournament	2016	2017	2018
Masters Tournament		T27	4
U.S. Open	T23LA	CUT	CUT
The Open Championship	T59	T44	CUT
PGA Championship		T58	T4

Tournament	2019	2020	2021	2022	2023	2024	2025	2026
Masters Tournament	T9	T7	T5	T27	1	T45	T14	T38
PGA Championship	CUT	T13	T8	T48	T50	CUT	T8	T2
U.S. Open	T3	T23	1	T12	T10		T7	CUT
The Open Championship	T11	NT	T3	T34	T2	T7	T34	T46

Win
Top 10
Did not play

"T" indicates a tie for a place
LA = low amateur
CUT = missed the half-way cut
NT = no tournament due to COVID-19 pandemic

=== Summary ===
Tournament	Wins	2nd	3rd	Top-5	Top-10	Top-25	Events	Cuts made
Masters Tournament	1	0	0	3	5	6	10	10
PGA Championship	0	1	0	2	4	5	10	8
U.S. Open	1	0	1	2	4	7	10	7
The Open Championship	0	1	1	2	3	4	10	9
Totals	2	2	2	9	16	22	40	34

- Most consecutive cuts made – 18 (2019 U.S. Open – 2024 Masters)
- Longest streak of top-10s – 5 (2020 Masters – 2021 Open)

== Results in The Players Championship ==
Tournament	2017	2018	2019	2020	2021	2022	2023
The Players Championship	T72	T63	T12	C	T9	T55	WD

Top 10

"T" indicates a tie for a place
WD = withdrew
C = Cancelled after the first round due to the COVID-19 pandemic

== Results in World Golf Championships ==
Tournament	2017	2018	2019	2020	2021	2022	2023
Championship	T3	T20	T45	T3	T32		
Match Play	2	T52	T24	NT^{1}	QF	R16	T31
Invitational	T28	T17	7	T52			
Champions	T36	T22		NT^{1}	NT^{1}	NT^{1}	

^{1}Cancelled due to COVID-19 pandemic

Top 10
Did not play

QF, R16, R32, R64 = Round in which player lost in match play
NT = No tournament
"T" = Tied
Note that the Championship and Invitational were discontinued from 2022. The Champions was discontinued from 2023.

== PGA Tour career summary ==
Season	Starts	Cuts made	Wins (majors)	2nd	3rd	Top-10	Top-25	Best finish	Earnings (US$)	Money list rank
2014–15	3	2	0	0	0	1	1	T5	n/a^{[a]}	n/a
2015–16	9	8	0	1	1	3	6	T2	$1,004,035	106
2016–17	23	21	1	2	2	11	14	1	$6,123,248	5
2017–18	20	16	1	1	0	5	10	1	$3,992,678	19
2018–19	20	18	1	0	2	12	17	1	$4,990,110	9
2019–20	15	14	2	1	1	8	10	1	$5,959,819	2
2020–21	22	21	1 (1)	2	2	15	18	1	$7,705,933	1
2021–22	19	18	1	1	1	8	13	1	$5,248,220	15
2022–23	20	18	4 (1)	2	1	10	13	1	$16,522,608	2
Career*	151	136	11 (2)	10	10	73	102	1	51,546,651	11

^{a} Rahm was an amateur through the 2016 U.S. Open.

* As of the end of the 2022–23 season

== European Tour career summary ==
Season	Starts	Cuts made	Wins (majors)	2nd	3rd	Top-10	Top-25	Best finish	Earnings	Money list rank
2016	2	2	0	0	0	0	1	T23	€18,513	n/a^
2017	13	11	2	1	1	5	6	1	€4,553,988	3
2018	12	10	1	0	0	6	9	1	€2,208,084	11
2019	13	11	3	2	1	8	9	1	€6,200,539	1
2020	5	5	0	0	1	2	4	3	€1,140,236	22
2021	9	8	1 (1)	0	1	6	7	1	€3,613,216	3
2022	9	9	2	1	0	4	5	1	€4,629,803	3
Career*	63	56	9 (1)	4	4	31	41	1	€21,834,859	13

Note that there is double counting of starts, wins, finishes and money for majors and WGC tournaments between the PGA Tour and European Tour stats.
^ Rahm was an amateur through the 2016 U.S. Open.
* As of the 2022 season

== Team appearances ==
Amateur

- European Boys' Team Championship (representing Spain): 2011 (winners), 2012
- Jacques Léglise Trophy (representing Continental Europe): 2011
- Bonallack Trophy (representing Europe): 2012 (winners)
- European Amateur Team Championship (representing Spain): 2013, 2014 (winners), 2015
- Palmer Cup (representing Europe): 2014 (winners), 2015
- Eisenhower Trophy (representing Spain): 2014 (individual leader)

Professional

- World Cup (representing Spain): 2016
- Ryder Cup (representing Europe): 2018 (winners), 2021, 2023 (winners), 2025 (winners)

Ryder Cup points record

2018	2021	2023	2025	Total
1	3.5	3	3	10.5

== Awards ==
Amateur

- Mark H. McCormack Medal (2015)
- Ben Hogan Award (2015, 2016)
- Jack Nicklaus Award (2016)

Professional

- Sir Henry Cotton Rookie of the Year (2017)
- European Tour Race to Dubai winner (2019)
- European Tour Golfer of the Year (2019)
- European Tour Players' Player of the Year (2019)
- PGA Tour money list winner (2020–21)
- PGA Player of the Year (2021)
- Byron Nelson Award (2020–21)
- Vardon Trophy (2021)
- European Tour Player of the Year (2021)
- LIV Golf League individual points list winner (2024, 2025, 2026)
- LIV Golf League money list winner (2024, 2025, 2026)

== See also ==
- List of golfers with most European Tour wins
